= List of Tamil films of 2016 =

Post-amendment to the Tamil Nadu Entertainment Tax Act 1939 on 27 September 2011, gross jumped to 130 per cent of net for films with non-Tamil titles and U certificates as well. Commercial Taxes Department disclosed ₹85.81 crore in entertainment tax revenue for the year. According to the FICCI-EY media and entertainment industry report, the Tamil film segment registered domestic net box office receipts of ₹946 crore with 12.6 crore admissions.

== Box office collection ==
The highest-grossing films released in 2016, by worldwide box office gross revenue, are as follows.

Rank	Title	Production company	Distributor	Worldwide gross	Ref.
1	Kabali	V. Creations	Gemini Film Circuit, Maxlab Cinemas and Entertainments, Fox Star Studios, Malik Stream Corporation	₹320+ crore	(Note: Box office gross values of ₹650 crore were reported for Kabali in the first 13 days by several organisations including Financial Express and Indian Express. Firstpost criticized these estimates as inflated, explaining the discrepancy as due in part to the addition of "pre-release business" figures, such as music and satellite rights sales of ₹200 crore. Firstpost wrote, "More conservative estimates put Kabali's collections at around Rs 300 crores from worldwide ticket sales." Figures given in December 2016 by Financial Express indicated an estimated domestic gross of ₹215 crore and an overseas gross of ₹262 crore, which total ₹477 crore. A figure of US$77 million given by Forbes in May 2017 converted to approximately ₹493–499 crore.)
2	Theri	V. Creations	SPI Cinemas, Sri Venkateswara Creations, Friday Film House, Carnival Motion Pictures	₹150 crore (equivalent to ₹193 crore or US$20 million in 2026)	
3	24	2D Entertainment	Eros International	₹108.90 crore (equivalent to ₹119 crore or US$12 million in 2026)	
4	Iru Mugan	Thameens Films	Auraa Cinemas, Thameens Release	₹95 crore (equivalent to ₹104 crore or US$11 million in 2026)	
5	K: The Deadly Spirit	Dream Warrior Pictures	Thenandal Films	₹92 crore (equivalent to ₹118 crore or US$12 million in 2026)	
6	Thodari	Sathya Jyothi Films	Ayngaran International	₹80 crore (equivalent to ₹103 crore or US$11 million in 2026)	
7	Aranmanai 2	Avni Cinemax	Sri Thenandal Films	₹55 crore (equivalent to ₹71 crore or US$7.3 million in 2026)	
8	Rajini Murugan	Thirupathi Brothers	Escape Artists Motion	₹50 crore (equivalent to ₹64 crore or US$6.7 million in 2026)	
9	Pichaikkaran	Vijay Antony Film Corporation	KR films	₹35 crore (equivalent to ₹45 crore or US$4.7 million in 2026)	
10	Dharma Durai	Studio 9	Studio 9	₹30 crore (equivalent to ₹39 crore or US$4.0 million in 2026)	

== Released films ==
=== January – July ===
Opening		Title	Director	Cast	Genre	Producer	Ref
J A N	1	Azhagu Kutti Chellam	Charles	Akhil, Riythvika, John Vijay, Karunas	Drama	Mercury Film Network	
J A N	1	Karai Oram	Jagadish Kumar	Nikesha Patel, Iniya, Vasistha, Simran	Mystery	RJ Combines	
J A N	1	Maalai Naerathu Mayakkam	Gitanjali Selvaraghavan	Balakrishna Kola, Wamiqa Gabbi, Parvathy Nair, Sharran Kumar	Romantic drama	Beeptone Studios	
J A N	1	Peigal Jaakkirathai	Kanmani	Jeeva Rathnam, Eshanya Maheshwari, Thambi Ramaiah, Rajendran	Horror comedy	Sri Sai Sarvesh Entertainments	
J A N	1	Tharkappu	R. P. Ravi	Shakthi Vasudevan, Vaishali Deepak, Sathish Krishnan, Samuthirakani	Action	Kinetoscope Production	
J A N	8	Arithaaram	T. Alexander	Tamizh, Sangeeth, Soniya	Action	JSV Cinemas	
J A N	8	Kurangu Kaila Poo Maalai	G. Krishna	Praveen Kumar Rajendran, Jagadeesh, Gautham, Chandini	Romance	Sai Ameer Productions	
J A N	8	Meenakshi Kadhalan Ilangovan	S. N. Hariram	Selvam, Abhinitha, Chandru, Saravanan	Romance	Povla Film International	
J A N	8	Thigilodu Vilaiyaadu	V. R. P. Manohar	Ravikumar	Horror	Studio Santhosh	
J A N	14	Gethu	Thirukumaran	Udhayanidhi Stalin, Amy Jackson, Sathyaraj, Vikranth	Action thriller	Red Giant Movies	
J A N	14	Kathakali	Pandiraj	Vishal, Catherine Tresa	Action thriller	Pasanga Productions & Vishal Film Factory	
J A N	14	Rajinimurugan	Ponram	Sivakarthikeyan, Keerthy Suresh, Soori, Samuthirakani	Comedy	Thirrupathi Brothers	
J A N	14	Tharai Thappattai	Bala	Sasikumar, Varalaxmi Sarathkumar	Action drama	B Studios & Company Productions	
J A N	22	Moondraam Ullaga Por	Sugan Kartthi	Sunil Kumar, Akhila Kishore, Wilson Ng	War drama	Aartin Frames & TRS Studios	
J A N	29	Aranmanai 2	Sundar C	Sundar C, Siddharth, Trisha, Hansika Motwani, Poonam Bajwa, Vaibhav	Horror comedy	Avni Cinemax	
J A N	29	Irudhi Suttru	Sudha Kongara	Madhavan, Ritika Singh, Mumtaz Sorcar	Sports drama	Thirukumaran Entertainment, UTV Motion Pictures & YNOT Studios	
J A N	29	Naalu Per Naalu Vidhama Pesuvaanga	L. Madhavan	Indrajith, Devika, Swaminathan	Comedy	Sri Krishna Talkies	
J A N	29	Nanaiyadha Mazhaiye	Mahendra Ganapathy	Dinesh, Vaidehi, Shankar	Romance	Kabi & Abi Chithirakatchi	
F E B	5	Bangalore Naatkal	Bhaskar	Arya, Bobby Simha, Sridivya, Rana Daggubati, Parvathy, Raai Laxmi, Samantha	Comedy drama	PVP cinema & Bommarillu Bhaskar Cinema	
F E B	5	Irandu Manam Vendum	Pradeep Sundar	Saji Surenderan, Chilanga, Saina	Drama	Holyman Films	
F E B	5	Naalai Mudhal Kudikka Matten	K. Senthil Raja	Raj, Kantharaj, Samathin, Panimathi	Comedy	Panimathi Film Productions	
F E B	5	Saagasam	Arun Raj Varma	Prashanth, Amanda Rosario, Sonu Sood	Action masala	Staar Movies	
F E B	5	Sethu Boomi	Kenthiran Muniasami	Thaman Kumar, Samskruthy Shenoy, Kenthiran Muniasami	Action	Royal Moon Entertainments	
F E B	5	Visaranai	Vetrimaaran	Dinesh, Anandhi, Samuthirakani	Crime thriller	Wunderbar Films & Grass Root Film Company	
F E B	12	Anjala	Thangam Saravanan	Vimal, Nandita, Pasupathy	Drama	Farmer's Master Plan Productions & 1st Copy Pictures	
F E B	12	Jil Jung Juk	Deeraj Vaidy	Siddharth, Sananth Reddy, Avinash Raghudevan	Fantasy comedy	Etaki Entertainment	
F E B	12	Vennilavin Arangetram	R. Muthukumar	Samasthi, Dhinesh Kumar, Murthy	Drama	R Productions	
F E B	12	Vil Ambu	Ramesh Subramaniam	Sri, Harish Kalyan, Srushti Dange, Chandini Tamilarasan, Samskruthy Shenoy	Action drama	Star Film Land & Nallusamy Pictures	
F E B	19	Miruthan	Shakti Soundar Rajan	Jayam Ravi, Lakshmi Menon	Science fiction	Global Infotainment	
F E B	19	Navarasa Thilagam	Kamran	Ma Ka Pa Anand, Srushti Dange, Karunakaran	Comedy	Square Stone Films	
F E B	19	Sethupathi	S. U. Arun Kumar	Vijay Sethupathi, Remya Nambeesan	Action drama	Vansan Movies	
F E B	26	Aarathu Sinam	Arivazhagan	Arulnithi, Aishwarya Rajesh, Aishwarya Dutta	Crime thriller	Sri Thenandal Films	
F E B	26	Kanithan	T. N. Santhosh	Atharvaa, Catherine Tresa, Sunder Ramu, Tarun Arora	Action thriller	V Creations	
F E B	26	Nayyapudai	Vijay Kiran	Pa. Vijay, Chandini Tamilarasan, S. A. Chandrasekhar	Action drama	6 Face Studios	
M A R	4	Pakki Payaluga	Bharathi	Valli, Lakshmanan, Murugesan, Manikandan	Action	Meenakshi Amman Studios	
M A R	4	Pichaikkaran	Sasi	Vijay Antony, Satna Titus	Action drama	Vijay Antony Film Corporation	
M A R	4	Pokkiri Raja	Ramprakash Rayappa	Jiiva, Hansika Motwani, Sibiraj	Comedy	PTS Film International	
M A R	4	Sowkarpettai	Vadivudaiyan	Srikanth, Raai Laxmi	Horror	Shalom Studios	
M A R	11	Aviyal	Five Directors	Nivin Pauly, Bobby Simha, Amrutha Srinivasan	Anthology	Stone Bench Creations	
M A R	11	Enna Pidichirukka	Subburaj	Kevin, Preethi Vij, Ravi Mariya	Romance	Bright Future Moviemakers	
M A R	11	Kadhalum Kadandhu Pogum	Nalan Kumarasamy	Vijay Sethupathi, Madonna Sebastian	Romantic comedy	Thirukumaran Entertainment & Studio Green	
M A R	11	Kathiravanin Kodai Mazhai	Kathiravan	Kannan, Srija, Kalanjiyam	Romance	Yazh Tamil Thirai	
M A R	11	Mapla Singam	N. Rajasekhar	Vimal, Anjali, Soori	Comedy	Escape Artists Motion Pictures	
M A R	11	Natpadhigaram 79	Ravichandran	Raj Bharath, Amzath Khan, Reshmi Menon, Tejaswi Madivada	Drama	Jayam Cine Entertainment	
M A R	18	Aagam	Vijay Anand Sriram	Irfan, Deekshitha Manikkam, Jayaprakash, Riyaz Khan	Drama	JYO Star Enterprises	
M A R	18	Endru Thaniyum	Bharathi Krishnakumar (writer, director, orator)	Yuvan Mayilsamy (actor), Jeevitha, Chandhana, Rajesh Balachandran	Romance	Vel Productions	
M A R	18	Pugazh	Manimaran	Jai, Surabhi, RJ Balaji	Action	Film Department	
M A R	18	Sawaari	Guhan Senniappan	Benito Franklin, Mathivanan Rajendran, Sanam Shetty	Thriller	Entertainment Brothers	
M A R	18	Vidayutham	Nagamaneci	Ram Saravana, Tanvi Ganesh Lonkar, Nagamaneci	Horror	Sree Nagaraja Sarpayakshi Films	
M A R	25	Adida Melam	Anbu Stalin	Abhay Krishna, Abhinaya, Gaana Bala	Romantic comedy	B Vision; Dado Creations	
M A R	25	Anbudan Anbarasi	Allwyn Amala Prasanna	Allwyn Amala Prasanna, Thaarani, Pandu, Velmurugan	Romantic comedy	Raj Marteen Films	
M A R	25	Thozha	Vamsi Paidipally	Nagarjuna, Karthi, Tamannaah	Drama	PVP cinema	
M A R	25	Vaaliba Raja	Sai Gokul Ramnath	Sethu, Vishakha Singh, Nushrat Bharucha, Santhanam	Comedy	Vanks Vision	
M A R	25	Zero	Arun Kumar	Ashwin Kakumanu, Sshivada, JD Chakravarthy	Supernatural thriller	Madhav Media Entertainments	
A P R	1	Darling 2	Sathish Chandrasekaran	Kalaiyarasan, Rameez Raja, Maya, Kaali Venkat, Hari	Horror comedy	Rite Media Works; Sathish Chandrasekaranin Kadhaigal	
A P R	1	Hello Naan Pei Pesuren	S. Bhaskar	Vaibhav, Aishwarya Rajesh, Oviya	Horror comedy	Avni Movies	
A P R	1	Narathan	Naga Venkatesh	Nakul, Nikesha Patel, Shruti Ramakrishnan, Premji Amaren	Comedy	Vetrivel Film International	
A P R	1	Uyire Uyire	A. Rajasekhar	Siddhu, Hansika Motwani	Romance	Jayaprada Productions; Studio 9 Motion Pictures	
A P R	8	Avan Aval	Ramkrish Mrinali	Vignesh, Devika Madhavan	Drama	Khayan Pictures	
A P R	8	Jithan 2	Rahul	Jithan Ramesh, Srushti Dange, Karunas, Yogi Babu	Horror Comedy	SK Entertainment	
A P R	8	Kida Poosari Magudi	J. Jayakumar	Thamizh, Ramdev, Nakshatra, Powerstar Srinivasan	Drama	Tamizh Thirai Viruthcham	
A P R	8	Mudhal Thagaval Arikkai	P. Rajaganesan	Rayan, Kalpana Jeyam, Mujieeb	Action	Vellithirai Talkies	
A P R	8	Oyee	Francis Markus	Geethan Britto, Eesha, Papri Ghosh, Arjunan	Romantic comedy	Mark Studio India Private Limited	
A P R	8	Tea Kadai Raja	Raja Subbiah	Raja Subbiah, Neha Gayatri, Yogi Babu, Sharmila Thapa	Comedy	Funtoon Talkies	
A P R	14	Nijama Nizhala	P. V. Sreenivasan	Akhil Iyer, Malavika Menon	Romance	Sekar Movies	
A P R	14	Theri	Atlee	Vijay, Samantha, Amy Jackson	Action thriller	V Creations	
A P R	14	Yokkiyan Varan Somba Thooki Ulla Vai	Swmayraaja	Vijay Nagaraj, Priya Menon, Singampuli, Thennavan	Comedy	KDFCS Creations	
A P R	15	Maasi Veedhi	Veeramurugan	Bala, Chandrika, Ganesh	Drama	Aarumuga Films	
A P R	22	Ennul Aayiram	Krishna Kumar	Maha, Marina Michael, Vincent Asokan	Suspense Drama	Om Ganesh Creations	
A P R	22	Guhan	Azhagappan	Aravind Kalathar, Sushma Prakash, Singampuli	Action	Great Talkies	
A P R	22	Vetrivel	Vasantha Mani	Sasikumar, Miya, Prabhu, Samuthirakani, Nikhila Vimal	Action drama	Lyca Productions	
A P R	29	Kalam	Robert Raaj	Srinivasan, Amzath Khan, Lakshmi Priyaa Chandramouli, Pooja Ramachandran	Horror	Arul Movies Production	
A P R	29	Kanden Kadhal Konden	Venkat G. Saamy	Guhan, Ashwini, Mayilswamy	Romance	Creative Teamz	
A P R	29	Manithan	I. Ahmed	Udhayanidhi Stalin, Hansika Motwani, Prakash Raj	Drama	Red Giant Movies	
A P R	29	Saalaiyoram	K Moorthy Kannan	Raj, Serena, Pandiarajan, Singampuli	Drama	Smiley Productions	
M A Y	6	24	Vikram Kumar	Suriya, Samantha, Nithya Menen	Science fiction	2D Entertainment	
M A Y	6	Edaal	Srijar	Venkat, Yuva	Romance	D Extravaganza	
M A Y	6	Ennam Puthu Vannam	Vaniyapadi Maninaidu	Vivekraj, Divya Nagesh, Nizhalgal Ravi	Drama	Produced by Jeeval Rudhen Pictures	
M A Y	6	Naan Yaar	Radha N	Jai Akash, Soniya Sharma	Romantic Drama	Jai Balaji Movie Makers	
M A Y	13	Inaiya Thalaimurai	P. Elanthirumaran / Su.Ci.Easwar	Ashwin Kumar, Manishajith	Political Drama	Maran Creations	
M A Y	13	Jambulingam 3D	Hari & Harish Narayan	Gokulnath, Anjena Kirti, Ashvin Raja, Sukanya	Comedy	MPL Films	
M A Y	13	Ko 2	Sarath	Bobby Simha, Nikki Galrani, Prakash Raj	Political drama	RS Infotainment	
M A Y	13	Pencil	Mani Nagaraj	G. V. Prakash Kumar, Sri Divya, Shariq Hassan	Thriller drama	Kalsan Movies	
M A Y	13	Unnodu Ka	RK	Aari, Maya, Misha Ghoshal	Romantic Comedy	Abirami Cinemas	
M A Y	20	Katha Solla Porom	S. Kalyan	Akshara, Viswanth, Kaali Venkat, Rajendran	Drama	Relax Adds Production	
M A Y	20	Kodeeswaran	Rajesh Patole	Govind Rao, Madhura Munjal, Arul Raj	Drama	Raj Production	
M A Y	20	Marudhu	M. Muthaiah	Vishal, Sri Divya	Action	Anna Gopuram Films	
M A Y	27	Idhu Namma Aalu	Pandiraj	Silambarasan, Nayanthara, Andrea Jeremiah	Romantic comedy	Chimbu Cine Arts	
M A Y	27	Jeniffer Karuppaiya	G. M. Saravanapandi	T. S. Vasan, Mridula Vijay, Rohini	Drama	Celebrity Cinema	
M A Y	27	Meera Jaakirathai	R. G. Keshavan	Surendar, Monica, Bobby Simha, Swaminathan	Horror	White Screen Entertainment	
M A Y	27	Sutta Pazham Sudatha Pazham	G. Shiva	Raju, Kasmira, Power Star Srinivasan	Comedy	RR Cine Art	
M A Y	27	Uriyadi	Vijay Kumar	Vijay Kumar, Mime Gopi, Henna Bella, Citizen Sivakumar	Political Thriller	Souvenir Productions	
J U N	3	Iraivi	Karthik Subbaraj	Vijay Sethupathi, S. J. Surya, Bobby Simha, Anjali, Kamalinee Mukherjee, Pooja Devariya	Drama	Thirukumaran Entertainment	
J U N	3	Kallathoni	B. Saddam Hussain	Deepika, Edin Alexander, Ramu	Drama	Vishnu Movie Makers	
J U N	3	Velainu Vandhutta Vellaikaaran	Ezhil	Vishnu Vishal, Nikki Galrani, Soori	Comedy	Vishnu Vishal Studioz, Ezhilmaaran Productions	
J U N	10	Oru Naal Koothu	Nelson	Dinesh Ravi, Miya, Nivetha Pethuraj, Karunakaran	Comedy drama	Kenanya Films	
J U N	10	Pandiyoda Galatta Thaangala	S. T. Gunasegaran	Nithin Sathya, Raksha Raj, Singampuli, Imman Annachi	Comedy	Virokshiya Media	
J U N	10	Vithaiyadi Naanunakku	Ramnathan K. B	Ramnathan K.B, Sowra Syed	Neo Noir Thriller	L9 & ISR Ventures	
J U N	17	Angali Pangali	S. Balamurugan	Vishnupriyan, Sanyathara, Soori	Comedy	SYJ Productions	
J U N	17	Enakku Innoru Per Irukku	Sam Anton	G. V. Prakash Kumar, Anandhi, Saravanan	Action Comedy	Lyca Productions	
J U N	17	Muthina Kathirika	Venkat Raghavan	Sundar C, Poonam Bajwa, Sathish	Comedy	Avni Cinemax	
J U N	24	Amma Kanakku	Ashwini Iyer Tiwari	Amala Paul, Revathi, Samuthirakani	Drama	Wunderbar Films, Colour Yellow Productions	
J U N	24	Metro	Ananda Krishnan	Shirish, Bobby Simha, Sendrayan	Action thriller	E5 Entertainments, Metro Productions	
J U N	24	Raja Manthiri	Usha Krishnan	Kalaiyarasan, Shaalin Zoya, Bala Saravanan, Kaali Venkat	Comedy drama	Etcetera Entertainment	

=== July – December ===
Opening		Title	Director	Cast	Genre	Producer	Ref
J U L	1	Appa	Samuthirakani	Samuthirakani, Thambi Ramaiah, Namo Narayana	Drama	Naadodigal Productions	
J U L	1	Jackson Durai	Dharani Dharan	Sathyaraj, Sibiraj, Bindu Madhavi	Horror comedy	Sri Green Productions	
J U L	1	Oru Melliya Kodu	A. M. R. Ramesh	Arjun, Shaam, Manisha Koirala, Aqsa Bhatt	Drama thriller	Akshaya Creations	
J U L	1	Paisa	Majith	Sree Raam, Aara, Nassar, Mayilsamy	Comedy	KJR Studios & RK Dream World	
J U L	7	Adra Machan Visilu	Thiraivannan	Shiva, Naina Sarwar, Srinivasan	Comedy	Arasu Films	
J U L	7	Dhilluku Dhuddu	Rambala	Santhanam, Shanaya, Saurabh Shukla	Horror comedy	Sri Thenandal Films	
J U L	8	Arthanari	Sundarra Elangovan	Arundhati, Ramkumar, Nassar	Drama	Kiruthikaa Film Company	
J U L	8	Ka Ka Ka Po	P. S. Vijay	Kesavan, Sakshi Agarwal, Karunas, Srinivasan	Comedy	ONS Movie Productions	
J U L	15	Kizhakku Chandu	A. Senthil Anandhan	Bala, Rani, Hashika Dutt, Saravana Subbiah	Drama	Karuppai Aandal Cinemas	
J U L	15	Kodambakkam Kokila	C. R. Muthupandi	Asha Latha, Seyon, Ashish, Ambani Shankar	Drama thriller	SVM Films	
J U L	15	Megamoottam	Vaidyanathan Natarajan	KV Rajan, MR Balan, R Murali	Romance	Kudavarasi Movie Creations	
J U L	15	Onbathilirindhu Pathu Varai	Vijai Shanmugavel Iyyanaar	Kathir, Swapna Menon, Saravana Subbiah	Drama thriller	Hero Cinemas	
J U L	15	Summave Aaduvom	Kadhal Sukumar	Arun Balaji, Leema Babu, Yuvarani, Bala Singh	Drama	Sri Ranga Production	
J U L	22	Kabali	Pa. Ranjith	Rajinikanth, Radhika Apte, Winston Chao, Kishore, Dinesh, Dhansika, Kalaiyarasan	Action drama	V Creations	
J U L	29	Vellikizhamai 13am Thethi	Pugaal Mani	Rathan Mouli, Shravya, Suza Kumar, Ramji	Horror Comedy	Govind Studio	
A U G	5	Sandikuthirai	Anbumani	Rajkamal, Manasa, Risha Arul, Ganja Karuppu	Romantic drama	Sun Moon Company	
A U G	5	Ennama Kadha Vudranunga	V. Francis Raj	Aarvi, Shalu, Alisha Chopra	Comedy drama	Alex Creations	
A U G	5	Tamilselvanum Thaniyar Anjalum	Premsai	Jai, Yami Gautam, Santhanam, Ashutosh Rana	Romantic comedy	Photon Kathaas	
A U G	5	Thirunaal	P. S. Ramnath	Jiiva, Nayanthara, Meenakshi	Action	Kodhandapani Films	
A U G	12	Joker	Raju Murugan	Guru Somasundaram, Ramya Pandian, Gayathri Krishnaa	Social satire	Dream Warrior Pictures	
A U G	12	Mudinja Ivana Pudi	K. S. Ravikumar	Sudeep, Nithya Menen, Prakash Raj	Action masala	Rambabu Productions	
A U G	12	Wagah	G. N. R. Kumaravelan	Vikram Prabhu, Ranya Rao, Karunas	Romanctic drama	Vijay Bhargavi Films	
A U G	19	Dharma Durai	Seenu Ramasamy	Vijay Sethupathi, Tamannaah, Aishwarya Rajesh, Srushti Dange, Radhika	Romantic drama	Studio 9 Productions	
A U G	19	Nambiyaar	Ganeshaa	Srikanth, Sunaina, Santhanam	Comedy	Golden Friday Films	
A U G	19	Yaanai Mel Kuthirai Sawaari	Karuppiah Murugan	Archana Singh, Rajendran, Krishnamoorthy, Swaminathan, Tharika, Mippu	Comedy	Battlers Cinema	
A U G	25	Bayam Oru Payanam	Manisharma	Bharath Reddy, Vishakha Singh, Meenakshi Dixit	Horror	Octo Spider Productions	
A U G	26	54321	Ragavendra Prasad	Shabeer, Aarvin, Pavithra Gowda, Rohini	Drama	MainStream Productions	
A U G	26	Andha Kuyil Needhana	Stanley Jose	Keerthi Krishna, Sagar, Sreya Jose, Salam Kunnath	Drama	Ponnu Films	
A U G	26	Enakku Veru Engum Kilaigal Kidayathu	Ganapathy Balamurugan	Goundamani, Soundararaja, Riythvika	Comedy	Jayaram Productions	
A U G	26	Meendum Oru Kadhal Kadhai	Mithran Jawahar	Walter Phillips, Isha Talwar	Romance	Block Ticket Films	
A U G	26	Vendru Varuvaan	Vijendran	Veera Bharati, Sameera, Vaiyapuri	Action	Reality Pictures	
S E P	2	Ilamai Oonjal	Mangai Harirajan	Namitha, Kiran Rathod, Meghna Naidu, Keerthi Chawla	Action	Shree Preyam Creations	
S E P	2	Kidaari	Prasath Murugesan	Sasikumar, Nikhila Vimal, Napoleon	Action	Company Productions	
S E P	2	Kuttrame Thandanai	M. Manikandan	Vidharth, Pooja Devariya, Aishwarya Rajesh, Rahman	Crime thriller	Don Productions & Tribal Art Productions	
S E P	2	Thagadu	M. Thanga Durai	Ajay, Sanam Shetty, Hashika Dutt, Prabha, Priyanka Shukla	Historical drama	Thai Thanthai Movies	
S E P	8	Iru Mugan	Anand Shankar	Vikram, Nayanthara, Nithya Menen	Action	Thameens Films	
S E P	8	Vaaimai	A. Senthil Kumar	Shanthanu Bhagyaraj, Bhanu, Goundamani, Ramki, Thiagarajan, Manoj Bharathi, Prithvi Rajan	Drama	Min Max Movies	
S E P	9	Pudhusa Naan Poranthen	Majid Abu	Biyon, Kalyani Nair, Kalabhavan Mani	Drama	Sahara Entertainments	
S E P	16	Nayagi	Govi	Trisha, Ganesh Venkatraman, Sushma Raj	Horror	Giridhar Production House	
S E P	16	Karma	R. Arvind	R. Arvind	Thiller	Creative Criminal	
S E P	16	Pagiri	Esakki Karvannan	Prabhu Ranaveeran, Shravya, Ravi Mariya	Romantic comedy	Lakshmi Creations	
S E P	16	Sadhuram 2	Sumanth Radhakrishnan	Yog Japee, Rohit Nair, Riaz, Sanam Shetty	Thriller	Knockout Entertainment & Grey Matter Studios	
S E P	16	Uchathula Shiva	Jaypee	Karan, Neha Ratnakaran, Aadukalam Naren	Action drama	K Entertainments	
S E P	22	Thodari	Prabhu Solomon	Dhanush, Keerthy Suresh, Ganesh Venkatraman	Romantic thriller	Sathya Jyothi Films	
S E P	23	Aandavan Kattalai	M. Manikandan	Vijay Sethupathi, Ritika Singh, Pooja Devariya	Comedy drama	Gopuram Films	
S E P	23	Oruthal	Krishnadasan	Senthil Jagadeesan, Gayathri Iyer	Drama	Sayeeleela Productions	
S E P	30	Aasi	N. P. S. Veerapandiyan	Varshika, Jaga, Jeyashree, Aarthi, Raj Kapoor	Horror	Shanmuga Pictures	
S E P	30	Kallattam	G. Ramesh	Nandha, Richard, Sharika, Usha Shree	Action	White Horse Productions	
S E P	30	Kanaga Durga	Chandra Kannaiyan	Magi, Saravanan, Divya Nagesh, Janvika, Delhi Ganesh	Devotional	Jothi Vinayagar Cinemas	
S E P	30	Kollidam	Nesam Murali	Nesam Murali, Ludhia, Vadivukkarasi	Action	Vertical Films	
S E P	30	Nunnunarvu	Mathivanan Sakthivel	Mathivanan Sakthivel, Indira	Thriller	Sakthi Screens	
S E P	30	Thirumaal Perumai	Gopal Ram	Gopal Ram, Tamilmani, Vaiyapuri, Delhi Ganesh	Devotional	MGS Films	
O C T	7	Devi	A. L. Vijay	Prabhu Deva, Tamannaah, Sonu Sood	Supernatural comedy	Prabhu Deva Studios	
O C T	7	Rekka	Rathina Shiva	Vijay Sethupathi, Lakshmi Menon, Sija Rose	Action masala	Comman Man Productions	
O C T	7	Remo	Bakkiyaraj Kannan	Sivakarthikeyan, Keerthy Suresh, Sathish	Romantic comedy	24AM Studios	
O C T	14	Ammani	Lakshmy Ramakrishnan	Lakshmy Ramakrishnan, Subbalakshmi, Nithin Sathya	Drama	Tag Entertainment	
O C T	21	Kagitha Kappal	S. Sivaraman	Appukutty, Dilija, M. S. Bhaskar	Drama	Evergreen Movie International	
O C T	21	Nee Enbathu	A. R. Rahim	Mukil, Shamja, Pandi	Romance	Try Film Productions	
O C T	21	Nenjukkulla Nee Neranjirukka	Sampathkumar–Rajendran	Sivahari, Ameetha	Drama	S. S. Studio Production	
O C T	28	Kaashmora	Gokul	Karthi, Nayanthara, Sri Divya	Supernatural	Dream Warrior Pictures	
O C T	28	Kodi	R. S. Durai Senthilkumar	Dhanush, Trisha, Anupama Parameswaran	Political thriller	Grass Root Film Company	
O C T	28	Thiraikku Vaaradha Kadhai	Thulasidas	Nadhiya, Iniya, Eden, Subiksha	Horror	MJD Production	
O C T	29	Kadalai	P. Sagayasuresh	Ma Ka Pa Anand, Aishwarya Rajesh, John Vijay, Ponvannan	Comedy	Udhayam Entertainment	
N O V	4	Ini Avanea	Sampathraj	Santhosh, Sasi, Ashleysha, Ruby, Pavani Reddy	Action thriller	Tamil Thai Creations & A.N.A Movie Creations	
N O V	11	Achcham Yenbadhu Madamaiyada	Gautham Vasudev Menon	Silambarasan, Manjima Mohan, Baba Sehgal	Action thriller	Ondraga Entertainment & Escape Artists Motion Pictures	
N O V	11	Meen Kuzhambum Mann Paanaiyum	Amudheswar	Kalidas Jayaram, Ashna Zaveri, Prabhu, Pooja Kumar	Comedy	Eshan Productions	
N O V	18	Anjukku Onnu	Arviyar	Amar, Guru Siddharth, Jerold, Megna, Umasri	Comedy	Parents Pictures	
N O V	18	Kadavul Irukaan Kumaru	M. Rajesh	G. V. Prakash Kumar, Nikki Galrani, Anandhi, Prakash Raj	Comedy	Amma Creations	
N O V	24	Kavalai Vendam	Deekay	Jiiva, Kajal Aggarwal, Bobby Simha, Sunaina	Romantic comedy	RS Infotainment	
N O V	25	Ilami	Julian Prakash	Yuvan, Anu Krishna, Akhil, Ravi Mariya	Historical	Joe Productions	
N O V	25	Kannula Kaasa Kattappa	Major Gowtham	Aravind Akash, Chandini Tamilarasan, Ashwathy Warrier	Comedy	Sugar & Spice Entertainment	
N O V	25	Pattathaari	A. R. Sankar Pandi	Abi Saravanan, Sayana Santhosh, Ambani Shankar	Comedy	Ges Movies	
N O V	25	Virumandikkum Sivanandikkum	Vincent Selva	Sanjay, Arundhati Nair, Thambi Ramaiah, Robo Shankar	Comedy	Lakshmi Talkies	
D E C	1	Saithan	Pradeep Krishnamoorthy	Vijay Antony, Arundhati Nair	Psychological thriller	Vijay Antony Film Corporation	
D E C	2	Azhahendra Sollukku Amudha	Nagarajan	Rijan Suresh, Aashritha, Pattimandram Raja	Romance	Ralph Productions	
D E C	2	Maaveeran Kittu	Suseenthiran	Vishnu Vishal, Sri Divya, Parthiban	Drama	Nallu Samy Pictures & Asian Cine Combines	
D E C	2	Pazhaya Vannarapettai	G. Mohan	Prajin, Richard, Nishanth, Ashmitha, Karunas	Drama	Sri Krishna Talkies	
D E C	9	Atti	Vijayabhaskar	Ma Ka Pa Anand, Ashmitha, Ramki	Comedy	Parinita Productions	
D E C	9	Chennai 600028 II	Venkat Prabhu	Shiva, Jai, Vaibhav, Premji, Vijay Vasanth, Aravind Akash, Nithin Sathya, Ajay Raj, Mahat Raghavendra	Sports Comedy	Black Ticket Company	
D E C	9	Parandhu Sella Vaa	Dhanapal Padmanabhan	Luthfudeen, Aishwarya Rajesh, Narelle Kheng, Karunakaran, Sathish, RJ Balaji	Romantic comedy	8 Point Entertainment	
D E C	16	Andaman	Aadhavan	Richard, Manochitra, Kannadasan, Manobala, Vaiyapuri	Romance	Sudha Movie Creations	
D E C	16	Veera Sivaji	Ganesh Vinayak	Vikram Prabhu, Shamili, John Vijay	Action	Madras Enterprises	
D E C	23	Balle Vellaiyathevaa	Prakash	M. Sasikumar, Tanya, Kovai Sarala, Sangili Murugan	Comedy	Company Productions	
D E C	23	Kaththi Sandai	Suraj	Vishal, Tamannaah, Jagapati Babu, Vadivelu	Action masala	Madras Enterprises	
D E C	23	Manal Kayiru 2	Madhan Kumar	Ashwin Shekhar, Poorna, S. Ve. Sekhar, Visu	Comedy drama	Sri Thenandal Films	
D E C	23	Ner Mugam	Murali Krishna	Rafee, Meera Nandan, Meenakshi, Pandiarajan	Action	Hi-Tech Pictures	
D E C	29	Dhuruvangal Pathinaaru	Karthick Naren	Rahman, Ashwin Kumar, Prakash Raghavan, Santhosh Krishna, Yaashika Aanand	Crime thriller	Knight Nostalgia Filmotainment & Venus Infotainment	
D E C	30	Achamindri	Rajapandi	Vijay Vasanth, Srushti Dange, Samuthirakani, Saranya Ponvannan	Action drama	Triple V Records	
D E C	30	Adhiran	J. V. Mohan	Suresh Kumar, Sanjana, Shreeram, Fathima	Drama	B Movies	
D E C	30	Eganapuram	V. Suresh Natchatra	V. Ravi, Jothisha Ammu, Rithu Rajasimman	Drama	VR Movies International	
D E C	30	Kandadhai Sollugiren	B. Lenin	Poo Ram, Anand, Janaki, Karuna, Jeniffer	Drama	Buddha Pictures & JSK Film Corporation	
D E C	30	Meow	Chinnas Palanisamy	R. Raja, Gayathri Iyer	Comedy thriller	Global Woods Movies	
D E C	30	Mo	Bhuvan Nallan	Suresh Ravi, Aishwarya Rajesh, Pooja Devariya, Ramesh Thilak, Ramdoss	Horror comedy	Moment Entertainment & Infotainment Ltd	
D E C	30	Thalaiyatti Bommai	Bagavathi Bala	Ramesh, Tanvi, Meera Krishnan	Horror comedy	S Films	

== Dubbed films ==
Opening	Title	Director(s)	Original film		Cast	Ref.
Opening	Title	Director(s)	Title	Language	Cast	Ref.
5 August	Namadhu	Chandrasekhar Yeleti	Manamantha	Telugu	Mohanlal, Gauthami	
14 October	Sivanaagam	Kodi Ramakrishna	Nagarahavu	Kannada	Vishnuvardhan, Ramya, Diganth, Saikumar	

== Awards ==
Category/organization	Filmfare Awards South 17 June 2017	IIFA Awards 28 March 2017	SIIMA Awards 30 June 2017
Best Film	Joker	Irudhi Suttru	Irudhi Suttru
Best Director	Sudha Kongara; Irudhi Suttru	Atlee; Theri	Atlee; Theri
Best Actor	R. Madhavan; Irudhi Suttru	R. Madhavan; Irudhi Suttru	Sivakarthikeyan; Remo
Best Actress	Ritika Singh; Irudhi Suttru	Ritika Singh; Irudhi Suttru	Nayanthara; Iru Mugan
Best Music Director	A. R. Rahman; Achcham Yenbadhu Madamaiyada	A. R. Rahman; Achcham Yenbadhu Madamaiyada	A. R. Rahman; Achcham Yenbadhu Madamaiyada

== Notable deaths ==
- J.Jayalalitha — 5 December
- Cho Ramaswamy - 7 December
