= List of accolades received by Kabali (film) =

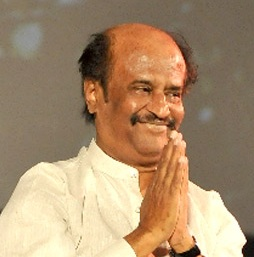
- Rajinikanth's performance in Kabali garnered him several awards and nominations
Accolades
| Award | Won | Nominated |
| Ananda Vikatan Cinema Awards | 5 | 5 |
| Edison Awards | 5 | 5 |
| Filmfare Awards South | 2 | 8 |
| IIFA Utsavam | 1 | 8 |
| Norway Tamil Film Festival Awards | 2 | 3 |
| South Indian International Movie Awards | 0 | 2 |
- Total number of awards and nominations (Note: Awards in certain categories do not have prior nominations and only winners are announced by the jury. For simplification and to avoid errors, each award in this list has been presumed to have had a prior nomination.)
| Totals | 15 | 31 |
- References

Kabali is a 2016 Indian Tamil-language crime drama film written and directed by Pa. Ranjith. It was produced by S. Thanu under his production company, V Creations. The film featured Rajinikanth as the titular character opposite Radhika Apte. The film features an ensemble cast consisting of Winston Chao, Kishore, Attakathi Dinesh, Sai Dhanshika, John Vijay, Nassar, Kalaiyarasan and Riythvika.

The film won 15 awards from 31 nominations; its direction, screenplay, performances of the cast members, and music have received the most attention from award groups.

== Awards and nominations ==
| Award | Date of ceremony (Note: Date is linked to the article about the awards held that year, wherever possible.) | Category | Recipient(s) and nominee(s) | Result | Ref. |
|---|---|---|---|---|---|
| Ananda Vikatan Cinema Awards | 13 January 2017 | Best Actor | Rajinikanth | Won | |
| Ananda Vikatan Cinema Awards | 13 January 2017 | Best Music Director | Santhosh Narayanan | Won | |
| Ananda Vikatan Cinema Awards | 13 January 2017 | Best Playback Singer – Male | Pradeep Kumar for "Maya Nadhi" and "Vaanam Paarthen" | Won | |
| Ananda Vikatan Cinema Awards | 13 January 2017 | Best Costume Designer | Anu Vardhan, Niranjani Ahathian | Won | |
| Ananda Vikatan Cinema Awards | 13 January 2017 | Most Popular Movie | S. Thanu | Won | |
| Edison Awards | 11 March 2017 | Best Film | S. Thanu | Won | |
| Edison Awards | 11 March 2017 | Best Director | Pa. Ranjith | Won | |
| Edison Awards | 11 March 2017 | Best Supporting Actor | John Vijay | Won | |
| Edison Awards | 11 March 2017 | Best Background Score | Santhosh Narayanan | Won | |
| Edison Awards | 11 March 2017 | Best Lyricist | Arunraja Kamaraj for "Neruppu Da" | Won | |
| Filmfare Awards South | 2016 | Best Film – Tamil | S. Thanu | Nominated | |
| Filmfare Awards South | 2016 | Best Director – Tamil | Pa. Ranjith | Nominated | |
| Filmfare Awards South | 2016 | Best Actor – Tamil | Rajinikanth | Nominated | |
| Filmfare Awards South | 2016 | Best Actress In a supporting role-female | Dhansika | Won | |
| Filmfare Awards South | 2016 | Best Music Director – Tamil | Santhosh Narayanan | Nominated | |
| Filmfare Awards South | 2016 | Best Lyricist – Tamil | Arunraja Kamaraj for "Neruppu Da" | Nominated | |
| Filmfare Awards South | 2016 | Best Male Playback Singer – Tamil | Arunraja Kamaraj for "Neruppu Da" | Nominated | |
| Filmfare Awards South | 2016 | Best Female Playback Singer – Tamil | Shweta Mohan for "Maya Nadhi" | Won | |
| IIFA Utsavam | 28–29 March 2017 | Best Film – Tamil | S. Thanu | Nominated | |
| IIFA Utsavam | 28–29 March 2017 | Best Director – Tamil | Pa. Ranjith | Nominated | |
| IIFA Utsavam | 28–29 March 2017 | Best Actor – Tamil | Rajinikanth | Nominated | |
| IIFA Utsavam | 28–29 March 2017 | Best Supporting Actress – Tamil | Dhansika | Nominated | |
| IIFA Utsavam | 28–29 March 2017 | Best Comedian – Tamil | John Vijay | Nominated | |
| IIFA Utsavam | 28–29 March 2017 | Best Music Director – Tamil | Santhosh Narayanan | Nominated | |
| IIFA Utsavam | 28–29 March 2017 | Best Lyricist – Tamil | Arunraja Kamaraj for "Neruppu Da" | Won | |
| IIFA Utsavam | 28–29 March 2017 | Best Male Playback Singer – Tamil | Pradeep Kumar, Ananthu for "Maya Nadhi" | Nominated | |
| Norway Tamil Film Festival Awards | 27–30 April 2017 | Best Actress | Radhika Apte | Nominated | |
| Norway Tamil Film Festival Awards | 27–30 April 2017 | Best Lyricist | Uma Devi for "Maya Nadhi" | Won | |
| Norway Tamil Film Festival Awards | 27–30 April 2017 | Best Male Playback Singer – Tamil | Pradeep Kumar for "Maya Nadhi" | Won | |
| South Indian International Movie Awards | 30 June–1 July 2017 | Best Music Director – Tamil | Santhosh Narayanan | Nominated | |
| South Indian International Movie Awards | 30 June–1 July 2017 | Best Lyricist – Tamil | Arunraja Kamaraj for "Neruppu Da" | Nominated | |

== See also ==
- List of Tamil films of 2016
