= Paramasivan Fathima =

2025 film by Esakki Karvannan

- Theatrical release poster
- Directed by: Esakki Karvannan
- Written by: Esakki Karvannan
- Produced by: Esakki Karvannan
- Starring: Vimal; Chayadevi
- Cinematography: Myna Sukumar
- Edited by: Buvan
- Music by: Deepan Chakravarthy
- Production company: Lakshmi Creations
- Release date: 6 June 2025
- Running time: 142 minutes
- Country: India
- Language: Tamil

Paramasivan Fathima is a 2025 Indian Tamil-language horror thriller film written, directed and produced by Esakki Karvannan under his Lakshmi Creations banner, starring Vimal and Chayadevi in the lead roles alongside M. S. Bhaskar, Cool Suresh, Sriranjani and others in supporting roles. The film was certified as "A" (adults only) by the Central Board of Film Certification (CBFC). Paramasivan Fathima released in theatres on 6 June 2025 to negative reviews from critics.

== Plot ==
A remote hill village is rocked by a series of bizarre and brutal murders. As the local police investigate, they discover the shocking truth the killer may not even be human. Their search uncovers an ancient secret buried deep within the village, revealing a terrifying motive behind the attacks. Vemal (Paramasivan) lives with his parents and sister in the northern part of the village and his uncles daughter Chaya (Tamizhselvi) lives in the southern part of the village. The church father comes and converts the families to Christianity promising jobs and a wonderful livelihood. Paramasivan s parents refuse to convert but his uncle converts leading to a dispute. The families stop visiting. Tamizhselvi resists conversion but is forced to change her name as fathima. The father urges more people to be converted. But fathima grows up and still loves her aunts son, her groom by custom. Paramasivan s cousin is promised fathima due to his refusal to convert but are killed. How their ghosts revenge and make the village aware is rest of the story.

== Cast ==
- Vimal as Paramasivan
- Chayadevi as Fathima / Tamilselvi
- M. S. Bhaskar as Church Father Oswald
- Manoj Kumar as Robert
- V. R. Vimalraj as Salim
- Seshvitha as Jennifer
- Esakki Karvannan as Police inspector
- Aruldoss as Veera Shiva Sambasivan
- Sriranjani as Dhanalakshmi, Paramasivan's mother
- M. Sukumar as Felix
- Veerasamar as Nandumaayi
- Kadhal Sukumar as Constable Kandasamy
- Cool Suresh as "Dubai" Raja
- Athira as Esther
- Mahendran as Katta Esakki
- Aaru Bala as Constable Veerasamy
- Kalaivani Kalai as Soosai
- Ramesh as Superintendent of Police (SP)
- Dindigul Alex as Siddhan Samiyar
- Vetrikumaran as Sultan
- Velaiyangiri as Peter Paul
- Santosh Suburamani as Jennifer's brother
- Revathi as Jensi
- Hashiba as Poongodi
- Andipatti Dhanam as Kaata Isakki's mother
- Malarvizhi as Dubai Raja's mother
- Elakiya as Police Constable
- Chinna as Poongodi's brother
- Mariammal as Poongodi's mother
- Deehan as Young Paramasivan
- Deesha as Young Fathima
- Sai Prakash as Young Felix

== Production ==
On 30 November 2024, Vimal through a first-look poster announced his 34th project titled Paramasivan Fathima, written, directed and produced by Esakki Karvannan who last directed Tamil Kudimagan (2023). The film is produced by Karvannan under his Lakshmi Creations banner featuring an ensemble cast including Chayadevi as the female lead, alongside M. S. Bhaskar, Manoj Kumar, Sriranjani, Athira, Aruldoss, Cool Suresh, Kadhal Sukumar, Veerasamar and others in supporting roles. The technical team consists of cinematographer Myna Sukumar, music composer Deepan Chakravarthy and editor Buvan. The trailer was launched on 14 March 2025 by NTK chief Seeman and Tamil Nadu BJP's former state president K. Annamalai.

== Music ==
Paramasivan Fathima

Soundtrack album by Deepan Chakravarthy
- Released: 26 May 2025
- Genre: Feature film soundtrack
- Label: Trend Music
- Producer: Deepan Chakravarthy

Deepan Chakravarthy chronology
Veerayi Makkal (2024)	Paramasivan Fathima (2025)

Singles from Paramasivan Fathima
- 1. "Naa Malli" Released: 9 May 2025

External audio
- Paramasivan Fathima - Audio Jukebox on YouTube

The film has music composed by Deepan Chakravarthy. The first single "Naa Malli" released on 9 May 2025. The pre-release audio launch event was held in Chennai on 26 May 2025, following which the full audio album containing the remaining 4 songs was released.

All lyrics are written by Ekadesi.

Track listing
No.	Title	Singer(s)	Length
1.	"Naa Malli"	Priya Himesh
2.	"En Virathangal"	Sreenisha
3.	"Kadu Enga Veedu"	Meenakshi Elayaraja, Meghna Sumesh, Kazhuthu Karthik, Deepan Chakravarthy
4.	"Oru Thalatu"	Saindhavi, Sreekanth Hariharan
5.	"Ododi Nee"	Muthusirpy, Hemambiga, Kazhuthu Karthik, Nageshwaran

== CBFC issues ==
Following its completion, the film was submitted to the regional office of the Central Board of Film Certification (CBFC) in Chennai for theatrical clearance. The examining committee flagged multiple scenes and dialogues, ultimately refusing to grant a standard certification without extensive cuts. The production house, Lakshmi Creations, applied for an official re-evaluation from the main CBFC board in Mumbai. The movie was eventually cleared on 23 May 2025 with a "A" (Adults Only) rating and a finalized theatrical running length of 143 minutes.

== Release ==
=== Theatrical ===
Paramasivan Fathima released in theatres on 6 June 2025.

=== Home media ===
Paramasivan Fathima is set to be premiered on Aha on 4 July 2025.

== Reception ==
The Times of India gave 1.5/5 stars and wrote "Just when you thought Kollywood had exhausted its quota of caste-and-religion films, along comes Paramasivan Fathima to prove there's always room for one more." It criticized the screenplay and likened the execution to "watching grown adults argue over whose imaginary friend is stronger" and noted "The film drags you through 140 minutes of village squabbling only to resolve everything with supernatural intervention [...] Paramasivan Fathima is the kind of film that thinks adding ghosts to rural conflicts automatically makes them interesting. It doesn't."

Cinema Express gave 1.5/5 stars, stating that it was a "contest between bad cinematic language and the worst political message". It noted that the writing that the movie "only speaks of the ill in Christianity while positioning itself as an anti-bigotry film" and accused the movie of being a "pernicious propaganda film" that took one-sided swipes at Christian conversions while "conveniently brushing under the carpet the caste inequalities" that drive them. It also noted that everything about the production was entirely "forgettable".

The Hindu Press, noted that the film "falters with ideological bias and shaky storytelling". It noted the use of "shallow storytelling" and "poor characterisation" to construct a "disturbingly one-sided ideological stance" and highlighted how the script reduced characters to preachy political mouthpieces, relied on derogatory terms like "rice-bag converts", and favored an "us versus them" dynamic over human empathy. It called the film, a total "misfire that uses cinema as a soapbox for divisive rhetoric rather than a medium for honest dialogue".
