= Shravya =

Indian actress

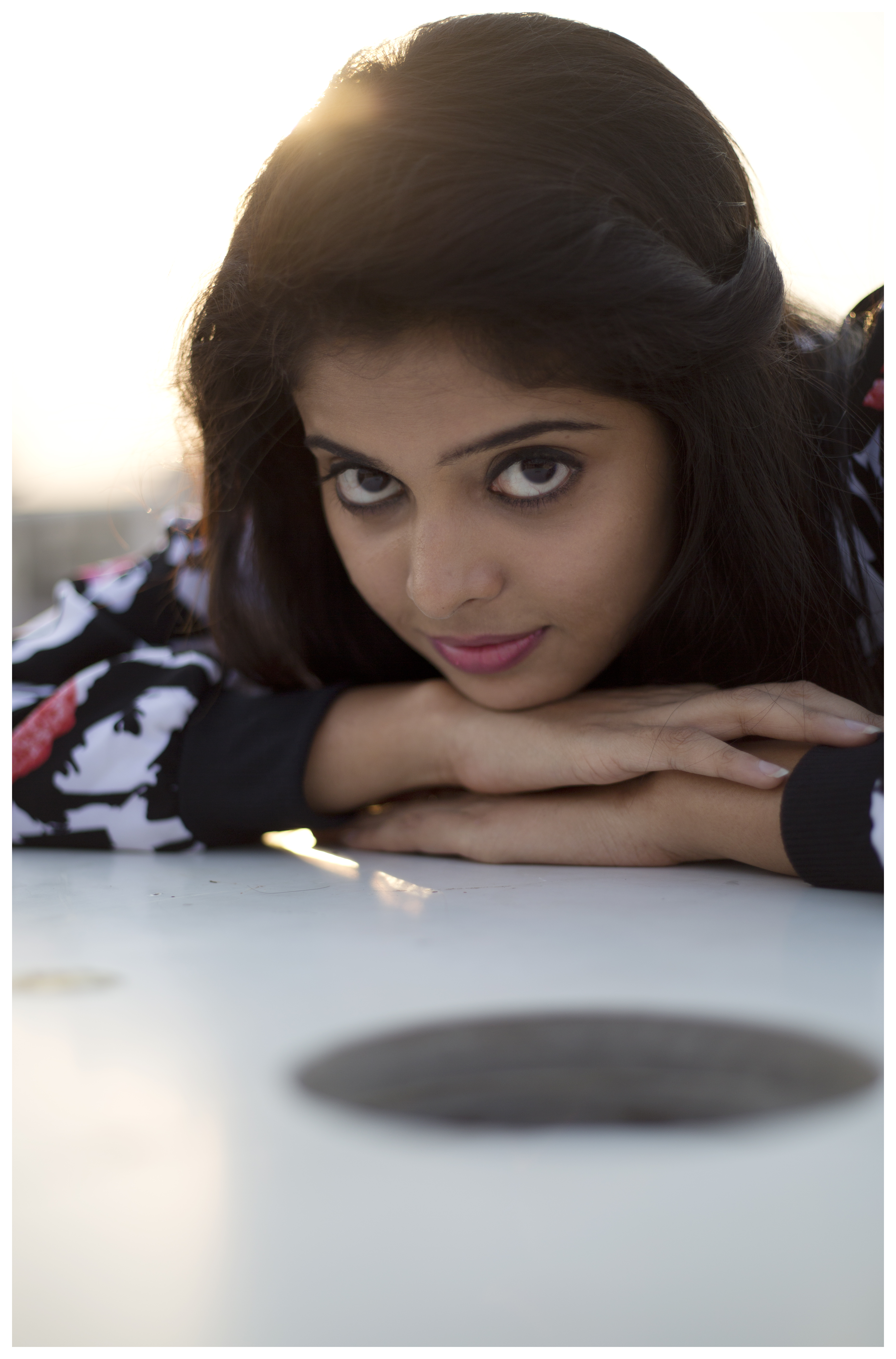
- Shravya in 2016
- Born: Shravya Boini; Hyderabad, Telangana, India
- Education: VNR Vignana Jyothi Institute of Engineering and Technology, Hyderabad
- Occupation: Actress
- Years active: 2002-2017

Shravya is a former Indian actress who has appeared in Telugu and Tamil language films. After making her debut as a child actress, Shravya has since played lead roles in Love You Bangaram (2014) and Vellikizhamai 13am Thethi (2016).

== Career ==
Shravya began her career as a child artist in the Telugu film industry, featuring in projects including Sandade Sandadi (2002) and Arya (2004). In 2014, she made her debut as a leading actress with Govi's Love You Bangaram and then also worked on Kai Raja Kai (2015). The films both received mixed reviews from critics.

In 2016, Shravya made her debut in Tamil language films through a role in Pugazh Mani's Vellikizhamai 13am Thethi (2016). Featuring alongside Rathan Mouli and Suza Kumar, the film garnered mixed reviews and had a low profile release at the box office.

== Filmography ==
Year	Film	Role	Language	Notes
2002	Sandade Sandadi		Telugu	Child artiste
2004	Arya	Arya's friend	Telugu	Child artiste
2005	Avunanna Kaadanna		Telugu	Child artiste
2014	Love You Bangaram	Meenakshi	Telugu	
2015	Kai Raja Kai		Telugu	
2016	Vellikizhamai 13am Thethi	Raasathi	Tamil	
2016	Pagiri	Madhu	Tamil	
2016	Nandini Nursing Home	Amulya	Telugu	
2017	Vilayattu Aarambam	Anjana	Tamil	
