= Mrs. Chinnathirai =

Indian Tamil-language reality show

- Genre: Reality; Talk show
- Presented by: Ma Ka Pa Anand
- Judges: Shakthi Vasudevan; Gayathri Raguram
- Country of origin: India
- Original language: Tamil
- No. of seasons: 1
- No. of episodes: 17

Production
- Executive producer: Brand Avatar
- Producer: Brand Avatar Hemachandran
- Camera setup: Multi-camera
- Running time: approx. 40-45 minutes per episode
- Production company: Brand Avatar

Original release
- Network: Vijay TV
- Release: 24 September 2017 – 21 January 2018

Mrs. Chinnathirai is a 2017 Indian Tamil-language reality television series that aired on Star Vijay every Sunday at 19:00 (IST) starting from 24 September 2017. This show features married female celebrities of the Tamil television industry. Through this show, they will display their talents and skills. The show is hosted by Ma Ka Pa Anand, Kollywood actor Shakthi Vasudevan and Tamil choreographer and actress Gayathri Raguram are the judges of the show. The show winner is Sujitha.

== Winners ==
The first season grand finale episode of Mrs. Chinnathirai aired on 21 January 2018, Sunday at 4:00PM (IST). The Tamil film actress Radha will be the chief guest with Kings of Comedy Juniors are expected to be a laugh riot.

Winners	Notes
Sujitha	Winners
RJ Sindhu; Vandhana	Runner-up

== Overview ==
The show have 9 different rounds, including the grand Finale. Each round will have a different theme and a different venue. The celebrity, who is super talented with multi-tasking capabilities will be winning the Title Mrs. Chinnathirai.

== Host ==
- Ma Ka Pa Anand: has appeared on Vijay TV in Tamil reality shows as a television host such as Airtel Super Singer, Athu Ithu Ethu and Kings of Dance. He is also an actor in Tamil movies

== Judge ==
- Shakthi Vasudevan: a Tamil actor best known for playing leading roles in Ninaithale Inikkum and a Bigg Boss Tamil season 1 contestant.
- Gayathri Raguram: an Indian Tamil actress and choreographer who has worked in the South Indian film industry in works such as Parasuram, Whistle and Vikadan and a Bigg Boss Tamil season 1 contestant.

== Celebrities ==
- Sujitha: who has appeared an actress best known for playing the lead role in Tamil serials such as Maharani (2009–2011), Vilakku Vacha Nerathula (2009–2012) and Oru Kai Osai (2014–2015).
- Nisha Krishnan: an anchor and actress best known for playing supporting roles in Tamil serials such as Kana Kanum Kalangal Kallooriyin Kadhai, Valli (2013), Deivamagal (2013–2014) and Office and lead roles such as Mahabharatham (2013–2016) and Thalayanai Pookal (2016–2017).
- Sindhu Shyam, an actress, did supporting roles in Malayalam movies such as Jeevan Masai and many Tamil television serials including Pagal Nilavu and Deivamagal.
- Monica, an actress, appeared in Deivam Thandha Veedu. She gained popularity when she was weather forecast anchor on Sun TV.
- Vandhana, an actress, played supporting roles in Anandham, Ponnunjal, Kalyanam Mudhal Kadhal Varai serials.
- RJ Sindhu, radio jockey for Fever FM and also judge on Kings of Comedy Juniors.
- Anu Vignesh, an actress who appeared in Mella Thirandhathu Kadhavu.
- Sri Vithiya, an actress who played supporting roles in Kallikattu Pallikoodam and Kalyana Parisu.
- Vanitha, an actress, who played supporting roles in Deivamagal, Thalayanai Pookal and Pagal Nilavu. She has also acted in Kalyanam Mudhal Kadhal Varai and Ponnunjal.
- Sri Durga, an actress, appeared in supporting roles in Alaigal and Mundhanai Mudichu.

== Team ==
Blue Team

Celebrities	Captain
Sujitha	Shakthi Vasudevan
Nisha Krishnan	Shakthi Vasudevan
Vanitha	Shakthi Vasudevan
Anu Viknesh	Shakthi Vasudevan
Sri Durga	Shakthi Vasudevan

Red Team

Celebrities	Captain
Vandhana	Gayathri Raguram
RJ Sindhu	Gayathri Raguram
Sri Vithiya	Gayathri Raguram
Sindhu Shyam	Gayathri Raguram
Monica	Gayathri Raguram

== List of episodes ==
Episodes	Telecast date	Task	Blue Team Point	Red Team Point	Leading Point Celebrities	Guest(s)
01	24 September 2017	Intro Round				
02	1 October 2017	Cooking Round	525	475	Sujitha	K. Bhagyaraj, Poornima
03	8 October 2017	Dancing, Singing and Acting Round			Sindhu Shyam; Sujitha	Kala
04	15 October 2017	Shopping Round			Shakthi Team	Athesh & Mridulasree from Kings of Comedy Juniors
05	22 October 2017	Proposal Round			Sindhu Shyam	Ramya Nambeesan; Husband of all contestants
06	29 October 2017	Make up Round			Sindhu Shyam & Sujitha	Aishwarya Rajesh
07	5 November 2017	Village Round 1	600	600	Vanitha	
08	12 November 2017	Village Round 2				
09	19 November 2017	Family Round 1			First place: RJ Sindhu, Second place: Anu Vignesh, Sri Durga, Monica	Meena
10	26 November 2017	Family Round 2			First Place: RJ Sindhu, Second Place: Anu Vignesh, Monica	Shakthi's wife
11	10 December 2017	Multitalent Round			First Place: Monika	Shanthanu, Nanditha, Baba Bhaskar

== Note ==
During Village Round. Each contestant were given a village based name for the round.

Contestant	Village Name Given
Sujitha	Solaiyamma
Vanitha	Karuppampatti
Anu Vignesh	Raakaayee
Sri Durga	Muthamma
Vandhana	Kaaliyamma
RJ Sindhu	Maariaattha
Sri Vithiya	Poovaattha
Sindhu Shyam	Mayilamma
Monica	Mookaayee

== Filming ==
The first schedule of filming was held in Tamil Nadu and Kerala. The Second schedule of filming was held in Goa (Episode: 13-14) and The Third schedule of filming was held in Thailand at Pattaya and Bangkok (Episode: 15-16). This is the first time in the history of Tamil television show was shot in Thailand.
