= Vadivel Balaji =

Indian television personality and actor (1975–2020)

- Born: Balaji; 17 February 1975; Madurai, Tamil Nadu, India
- Died: 10 September 2020 (aged 45); Chennai, Tamil Nadu, India
- Occupations: Television personality, actor, Mimicry artist
- Known for: Kalakka Povathu Yaaru; Adhu Idhu Yedhu
- Spouse: Jyothilakshmi(?.2020)
- Children: 2

Vadivel Balaji (17 February 1975 – 10 September 2020) was an Indian television comedian, mimicry artist and actor. He received the nickname Vadivel after gaining fame among audience for imitating popular Tamil comedian Vadivelu's voice in television programmes. He was well known for his works in the television field and appeared in prime time Star Vijay television programmes such as Kalakka Povathu Yaaru (Season 4), Siricha Pochu in Adhu Idhu Yedhu. He also took part as a contestant in the eighth season of the reality television show Jodi Number One. He and his wife participated in Mr & Mrs Chinnathirai season 2, he also appeared in Start Music segments shortly before his demise.

== Personal life ==
He was married to Jyothilakshmi. They have a son, Srikanth, and a daughter, Sridevi.

== Death ==
On 24 August 2020, Balaji was admitted in two private hospitals; Billroth Hospital and Vijaya Hospital which were located in Chennai. Balaji reportedly suffered a cardiac attack two weeks ago and was facing severe health complications after that. On 10 September 2020, he was moved to a government hospital just prior to his demise. He died that morning, at the age of 45.

== Filmography ==
Year	Film	Role	Notes
2011	Sabash Sariyana Potti	Himself	Uncredited role
2013	Yaaruda Mahesh		
2016	Sutta Pazham Sudatha Pazham		
2018	Kolamavu Kokila	Remo Kumar	
2022	Pen Vilai Verum 999 Rubai Mattume		Posthumous release
2026	Sandakkari	Auto driver	Posthumous release

== Television ==
Year	Program	Role	Channel	Notes	Ref.
2008	Kalakka Povathu Yaaru (Season 4)	Contestant	Star Vijay		
2009	Comedy Puram	Contestant		A Comedy Show presented by Symphony Recordings. They have also released a music DVD.	
2009-2020	Adhu Idhu Yedhu (Siricha Pochu)	Performer	Star Vijay		
2015	Kitchen Super Star (Season 4)	Contestant	Star Vijay		
2016	Kalakka Povathu Yaaru (Season 5)	Judge	Star Vijay	only a few episodes	
2017-2019	Kalakka Povathu Yaaru Champions (Season 1 & 2)	Performer	Star Vijay		
2018	Jodi Number One (Season 8)	Contestant	Star Vijay		
2019	Mr and Mrs Chinnathirai (Season 2)	Contestant	Star Vijay		
2019	Start Music (Season 2)	Performer	Star Vijay		

== Awards and honors ==
- Star Vijay Television Award - Best Comedy Team (Siricha Pochu)
- Kalakka Povathu Yarru Champions (Session 1) - Winner Team Pulikesi (Team Captain)
- Kalakka Povathu Yarru Champions (Session 2) - Best Comedian
