= Sandikuthirai =

2016 Indian film by Anbumathi

- Official poster
- Directed by: Anbumathi
- Starring: Rajkamal; Manasa; Hari; Divya
- Cinematography: Veera
- Music by: Varashree
- Production company: Sun Moon Company
- Release date: 5 August 2016
- Country: India
- Language: Tamil

Sandikuthirai (transl. War horse) is a 2016 Indian Tamil-language drama film directed by Anbumathi and starring Rajkamal, Manasa, Hari, and Divya.

== Cast ==
- Rajkamal as Ravi
- Manasa Radhakrishnan as Keerthi
- Hari as Hari
- Divya as Sudha
- Ganja Karuppu
- Delhi Ganesh as Sudha's grandfather
- Bonda Mani

== Production ==
Television actor Rajkamal made his foray into film as a lead actor after his film Melnaattu Marumagan was delayed.

== Soundtrack ==
Music by Varashree.

- "Achacho Aasai" - Mukesh, Priya Himesh
- "Adikkura Ootha" - Mukesh, Priya Himesh
- "Ennulle Ennulle - Suchitra Balu
- "Nee Oru" - V V Prasanna, Saindhavi
- "Nilavenge" - Ananthu
- "Sandikuthirai Theme - Mukesh, Priya Himesh

== Reception ==
Malini Mannath of The New Indian Express opined that "Helmed by a debutant maker and boasting of no big names in the cast or crew, the film delivers more than what one would have expected from it". A critic from iFlicks noted that "Overall, Sandikuthirai fails to attract the audience". A critic from Maalaimalar and Dinamalar criticised the film. A critic from The Times of India Samayam felt that the film had several weaknesses.
