= Pen Vilai Verum 999 Rubai Mattume =

2022 Tamil language drama film

- Theatrical release poster
- Directed by: Varadaraj
- Produced by: Shankar
- Starring: Rajkamal; Swetha Pandit
- Cinematography: Satish Kumar; Karva Mohan
- Edited by: Saravanan G. N.
- Music by: Judha Sandy; Vivek Chakravarthy
- Production company: Rainbow Productions
- Distributed by: Action Reaction
- Release date: 7 January 2022
- Running time: 118 mins
- Country: India
- Language: Tamil

Pen Vilai Verum 999 Rubai Mattume (transl. The price of a girl is only 999 rupees) is a 2022 Indian Tamil-language drama film directed by Varadaraj and starring Rajkamal and Swetha Pandit. It was released on 7 January 2022.

== Cast ==
- Rajkamal as Aravind
- Swetha Pandit
- Vadivel Balaji
- Jayachandran
- Ramar
- Chris

== Production ==
The film initially had the title Penn Vilai Verum Roobai 999 (price of a girl is only 999 rupees), to which the Tamil Film Producers Council as well as the Producers Guild objected. It was later shortened to PV999, before it released under a longer name. Production for the film started in mid-2018.

== Reception ==
The film was released on 7 January 2022 across Tamil Nadu. A critic from Maalai Malar gave the film a mixed review, noting it had a social message. A reviewer from Dinamalar rated it 2.25 out of 5, calling out the low production values.

A critic from News Today called the film "a movie with a message".
