= Esakki Karvannan =

Indian film director

- Born: Tamil Nadu, India
- Occupation: Film director
- Years active: 2016-present

Esakki Karvannan is an Indian film director, who has directed Tamil language films. He made his directorial debut with the romantic comedy-drama Pagiri (2016), and has gone on to make films including Pettikadai (2019) and Tamil Kudimagan (2023).

== Career ==
Esakki Karvannan's directorial debut was Pagiri (2016), a film which talked about the plight of farmers in Tamil Nadu. The title of the film was a transliteral translation for WhatsApp, which formed a significant part of the plot. The film opened to negative reviews, with The Times of India rated it two out of five stars, calling it a "missed opportunity" that failed to mirror the gravitas of actual farmer protests. Deccan Chronicle added that the incorporation of shallow, low-brow comedy severely diluted the structural message the narrative aimed to deliver. His second film, Pettikadai (2019) with Samuthirakani playing the lead, received negative reviews from critics. The Times of India gave 1 out of 5 stars and labelled the film a contender for "the worst Tamil film of the year," criticizing its technical production values as resembling a low-quality home video. Concurrently, The New Indian Express labeled the film as a "petty film filled with regressive ideas".

His next release, Tamil Kudimagan (2023), featured Cheran in the lead role. Prior to the film's release, Karvannan stated that he hoped the film would create debates about Tamil culture. He later directed Paramasivan Fathima (2025) where he also played the police lead. It opened to negative reviews, with critics calling it as a "pernicious propaganda film" that used cinema as a soapbox for divisive, one-sided rhetoric. Cinema Express and The Hindu Press noted that the screenplay was heavily driven by a "disturbingly one-sided ideological stance," reducing characters to preachy political mouthpieces and taking targeted swipes at Christianity while utilizing derogatory slurs like "rice-bag converts" and valued division over common humanity.

== Filmography ==
Films

| Year | Film | Notes |
|---|---|---|
| 2016 | Pagiri | |
| 2019 | Pettikadai | |
| 2023 | Tamil Kudimagan | |
| 2025 | Paramasivan Fathima | Also actor |
