= Navarasa Thilagam =

2016 Indian film by Kamran

- Theatrical release poster
- Directed by: Kamran
- Written by: Kamran
- Produced by: Sudharshan Vembatty
- Starring: Ma Ka Pa Anand; Srushti Dange
- Cinematography: A. Ramesh
- Edited by: Arul Mozhi Varman
- Music by: Siddharth Vipin; Score: Sudharshan M. Kumar
- Production company: Square Stone Films
- Release date: 19 February 2016
- Running time: 145 minutes
- Country: India
- Language: Tamil

Navarasa Thilagam is a 2016 Indian Tamil-language comedy film directed by Kamran, starring Ma Ka Pa Anand and Srushti Dange. Produced by Sudharshan Vembatty, the film began production in early 2015 and released in February 2016. The title of this film is released after the thespian R. Muthuraman who received the same title.

== Cast ==
- Ma Ka Pa Anand as Moorthy
- Srushti Dange as Chithra
- Karunakaran as Alangaram
- Meera Krishnan as Chithra's mother
- Ilavarasu as Paneerselvam
- Jayaprakash as Thangadurai
- Mahadevan as Adaikalam
- Namo Narayana as Namo Narayana
- Siddharth Vipin as Thirunavukkarasu
- Revathi as Chithra's grandmother
- Amirtha Lingam as Alangaram's uncle
- Cheran Raj as Politician
- Porali Dileepan as Arul Prasath
- Lakshmi Rahul as Meenakshi
- Bava Lakshmanan
- Hello Kandhasamy
- Anjali Varadarajan

== Production ==
Ma Ka Pa Anand shot for the film simultaneously alongside his commitments for Panjumittai, Atti and Deepavali Thuppakki. The film was predominantly shot in Pollachi and was completed by September 2015. Songs were also shot in Kutralam and Thenkasi. The lead pair refused to shoot a kissing scene in the film, and stated that the director failed to disclose the shot in the original narration of the script.

== Soundtrack ==
The soundtrack was composed by Siddharth Vipin.

Track listing
No.	Title	Singer(s)	Length
1.	"Ayyayyo Vasama"	Karthik, Sunitha Sarathy
2.	"Oru Kattu"	Jagadish, Vishnupriya
3.	"Dummy Davali"	Jagadish, Naresh Iyer
4.	"Kolla Azhagukari"	Anthony Daasan
5.	"Angaliya"	Anthony Daasan

== Critical reception ==
M. Suganth of The Times of India wrote, "Navarasa Thilagam is a film that thinks of itself as a comedy while not making an effort to be one. The writing is quite bland (there is zero effort in building up the central romantic track) and the narrative predictable (we even get a hapless 'foreign mapillai'), and it is left to the cast to shore up the film." Malini Mannath of The New Indian Express wrote, "The screenplay is more verbal in its take. The script may have seemed good on paper, but on the screen it falls flat. If only it had some punch and was crafted more interestingly [..] Navarasa Thilagam is, at most, a promising effort from a debutant maker." Sify wrote "Overall, Navarasa Thilagam is a damp squib and the joke is only on us!."
