= Vellikizhamai 13am Thethi =

2016 film by Pugazhmani

- Directed by: Pugazhmani
- Written by: Pugazhmani
- Produced by: Vikram Kumar
- Starring: Rathan Mouli; Shravya; Suza Kumar
- Narrated by: Rathan Mouli
- Cinematography: KS Selvaraj
- Edited by: Rajkeerthi
- Music by: Taj Noor
- Production company: Govind Studio
- Release date: 29 July 2016
- Running time: 127 minutes
- Country: India
- Language: Tamil

Vellikizhamai 13am Thethi (transl. Friday the 13th) is a 2016 Indian Tamil-language comedy horror film directed by Pugazhmani and starring Rathan Mouli, Shravya, and Suza Kumar.

== Plot ==
Raasathi is an adamant girl and her father is ready to do anything that she asks. On one such day, her father buys a piece of land under her name and build a marriage hall on top of it. Raasathi is persuaded by her mother to get married, but the groom gets angry and puts the hall on fire after he learns that Raasathi is having an affair with someone else. Thirteen people die in the fire. An enchanter advises Raasathi that if she is married in the same hall, then all of the evil spirits will die off. Her brother Ramakrishnan assigns Saravanan and his group of friends the job of renovating the hall. How Saravanan and his group of friends rid the hall of spirits forms the rest of the story. Along the way, Saravanan meets his friend Malliga.

== Cast ==
- Rathan Mouli as Saravanan
- Shravya as Raasathi
- Suza Kumar as Malliga
- Livingston as Ganesan, a fan of Sivaji
- Ramji as Ramakrishnan, Raasathi's brother
- Raandilya as a ghost
- M. S. Bhaskar as Saravanan's friend
- Manobala as the doctor
- Chitra Lakshmanan as Raasathi's father
- Chaams as Saravanan's friend
- Vaiyapuri as Saravanan's friend
- Rekha as Saravanan's mother
- Nirosha as Ganesan's younger sister
- Madhumitha as Raasathi's friend
- Rangammal as Grandmother
- E. Ramdoss as Raasathi's to-be father-in-law

== Production ==
Rathan Mouli plays the male lead in the film. Telugu actress Shravya, who was a part of Love You Bangaram, was signed to play the lead actress. The film marks her Tamil debut and she portrays a ghost in the film. Suza Kumar, who starred alongside Rathan Mouli in, was cast to play the second actress and appears post-interval. Raandilya, who played a role in Vanmam, portrayed a ghost in the film.

== Reception ==
Malini Mannath of The New Indian Express wrote that "An average entertainer, the film could have done with better content and definitely with more style". On the contrary, a critic from Maalai Malar praised the director's effort and the performances of the lead cast, the background music, and the cinematography.
