= Nandini Nursing Home =

Indian comedy film

- Theatrical release poster
- Directed by: P. V. Giri
- Starring: Naveen Vijaya Krishna; Nitya Naresh; Shravya; Shakalaka Shankar; Vennela Kishore; Saptagiri
- Edited by: Karthika Srinivas
- Music by: Achu Rajamani
- Production company: SVC Entertainment Pvt. Ltd
- Release date: 21 October 2016
- Country: India
- Language: Telugu

Nandini Nursing Home is a 2016 Indian Telugu-language comedy drama film directed by P. V. Giri and starring Naveen Vijaya Krishna, Nitya Naresh, and Shravya with Shakalaka Shankar, Vennela Kishore, and Saptagiri in supporting roles. The film was released to mixed reviews.

== Cast ==
- Naveen Vijaya Krishna as Chandoo
- Nitya Naresh as Nandini
- Shravya as Amulya
- Shakalaka Shankar as Naidu
- Vennela Kishore as Ganesh
- Saptagiri as Inpatient
- Jayaprakash Reddy as Dr. Venkateshwarlu
- Jayaprakash as Dr. Murthy
- Ajay Ghosh as CI Ratna Babu
- Sanjay Swaroop as Dr. Jairam
- Bhadram as Seenu
- Kotesh Manava as K. Praveen Goud

== Production ==
The launch of the film was attended by several of Nawin Vijaya Krishna's family members and friends such as Naresh, Krishna, Vijaya Nirmala, Mahesh Babu, Sudheer Babu and Sai Dharam Tej.

== Soundtrack ==
Nandini Nursing Home

Soundtrack album by Achu Rajamani
- Released: 2016
- Genre: Feature film soundtrack
- Length: 17:21
- Language: Telugu
- Label: Mango Music

Achu Rajamani chronology
Mama Manchu Alludu Kanchu (2015)	Nandini Nursing Home (2016)	Luckunnodu (2017)

The film has soundtrack composed by Achu Rajamani.

All lyrics are written by Rahman.

Track listing
No.	Title	Singer(s)	Length
1.	"Kalthi"	Dhanunjay Seepana	3:17
2.	"Ninney"	Achu Rajamani	4:21
3.	"Nanney Nanney"	Mansi Mahadevan, Sooraj Santhosh	3:48
4.	"Party Party"	Sunitha Sarathy, Rohan Prakash, Achu Rajamani	4:14
5.	"Ninney - Reprise Version"	Achu Rajamani	1:38
Total length:			17:21

== Reception ==
A critic from The Hindu wrote that "Despite the story being set in a hospital throughout the film, you don’t feel claustrophobic. The freshness and compactness of the story, without any diversions, make it enjoyable and a time pass watch". A critic from The Hans India wrote that "‘Nandini Nursing Home’ is no surprise. It not only treads the beaten track but so strongly suffers unjustified self-belief that it keeps you seated for over two and half hours of running time. The dosage is not only unpalatable but strong".
