= Savarikkadu =

2017 Indian film by M. N. Krishnakumar

- Theatrical release poster
- Directed by: M. N. Krishnakumar
- Written by: M. N. Krishnakumar
- Produced by: M. N. Krishnakumar
- Starring: Krishnakumar; Rajapandi; Ravindran; Swathi; Renuka
- Cinematography: K. Gokul
- Edited by: Marees A.
- Music by: Indiravarman AT
- Production company: Annai Therasa Films
- Release date: 21 July 2017
- Running time: 118 minutes
- Country: India
- Language: Tamil

Savarikkadu is a 2017 Indian Tamil-language comedy thriller film directed by M. N. Krishnakumar and starring himself, Ravindran, Rajapandi, Swathi and Renuka. The film released after a three-year delay.

== Cast ==
- Krishnakumar
- Rajapandi
- Ravindran
- Swathi
- Renuka
- Soori as Master
- Shanmugarajan as Forest ranger
- Halwa Vasu
- Robo Shankar as Master's troupe member
- K. Ramaraj
- Ambani Shankar as Master's troupe member
- Prema Priya

== Production ==
The film was shot in Dindigul, Kodaikanal, Palani and Udumalai in 2014.

== Soundtrack ==
The music was composed by Indiravarman AT. A promotional song " Kadu Kadu Savarikadu" was released on 18 July 2017 featuring K. Bhagyaraj, T. Siva, J. Satish Kumar, Soundararaja, Pa. Ranjith, Aari, Udhaya and Natty Subramaniam.

Track listing
| No. | Title | Singer(s) | Length |
|---|---|---|---|
| 1. | "Thuyaram Koottam" | Harisaran | 5:32 |
| 2. | "Kavalai Edhum Ayya" | Ranjith | 5:39 |
| 3. | "Kadu Kadu Savarikadu" | Varman | 3:44 |
| 4. | "Eatham Eatham" | Pirasana, Jayamoorthy | 4:36 |
| Total length: | | | 19:31 |

== Reception ==
A critic from iFlicks wrote that "Director MN Krishnakumar has shown the friendship between the five friends in a good manner, but has failed in terms of his script and screenplay. If one were to look at the film as a comedy flick, there are no laugh out loud moments. If the film is passed out as a horror venture, barely do we feel scared". A critic from Maalai Malar noted that the film was not scary.
