= Arasakulam =

2017 Tamil film by Kumaramaran

- Poster
- Directed by: Kumaramaran
- Produced by: S Bhomaram Sain
- Starring: Rathan Mouli; Nayana Nair
- Cinematography: Chandrasekhar SR
- Music by: Velan Sakadevan
- Production company: BR Sain Films
- Release date: 31 March 2017
- Country: India
- Language: Tamil

Arasakulam (transl. Kingdom) is a 2017 Indian Tamil-language action masala film directed by Kumaramaran and starring Rathan Mouli and Nayana Nair.

== Cast ==
- Rathan Mouli as Muthupandi
- Nayana Nair
- Rajasimman
- Rajashree
- Balamurugan
- Ambani Shankar

== Production ==
The film is based on a true story about a royal family. The film marks the Tamil debut of Malayalam actress Naina Nair and was shot in Kodaikanal, Kovilpatti, Thoothukudi, and Tirunelveli. The film is about friendships between people of southern Tamil Nadu. The director, Kumaramaran, stayed at Theni for two years to observe the people and families there as source material for the script. The audio release function took place in January 2017.

== Release and reception ==
A critic from Maalai Malar gave the film a rating of seventy-six out of one-hundred. The reviewer praised the performance of Rathan Mouli, the cinematography, and the songs while criticizing the story citing the lack of one. Samayam gave the film a rating of one-and-half out of five stars and criticized the lack of story.
