= Ambasamudram Ambani =

- Theatrical release poster
- Directed by: P S Ramnath
- Written by: P S Ramnath
- Produced by: Karunas; Singapore R.Saravana; A. John Peter
- Starring: Karunas; Navneet Kaur; Kota Srinivasa Rao
- Cinematography: P. Pulidevan
- Edited by: V. T. Vijayan
- Music by: Songs: Karunas; Background score: Sabesh–Murali
- Production company: Ken media
- Distributed by: J B Media & Entertainments
- Release date: 2 July 2010
- Running time: 142 minutes
- Country: India
- Language: Tamil
- Budget: ₹7.5 million (US$79,000)
- Box office: ₹10 million (US$100,000)

Ambasamudram Ambani (transl. Ambasamudram's Ambani) is a 2010 Indian Tamil-language comedy drama film written and directed by Ramnath. P. It was produced by actor Karunas, Singapore R. Saravana and A. John Peter. The film stars Karunas, Navneet Kaur, Ambani Shankar, and Kota Srinivasa Rao alongside an ensemble supporting cast including Cochin Haneefa, Sriranjani, Livingston, Delhi Ganesh, and R. Sundarrajan. Karunas had also composed the songs, while Sabesh–Murali composed the background score and lyrics were written by "Kaviperarasu" Vairamuthu. Cinematography was handled by P. Pulidevan and editing by V. T. Vijayan. The film released on 2 July 2010 and become a decent hit.

== Plot ==
Dhandapani, coming from a poor background, nurtures his ambition to become an owner of businesses like Reliance, Vasanth & Co, Saravana Stores, etc. He meets Nandhini, who falls in love with him because of his steadfast ambition. Dhandapani is not in a position to accept owing to his goals. Thereafter, he gives all his hard-earned money to Annachi to own a shop in his newly constructed complex. Before the construction is over, Annachi dies. Annachi's son Kishore does not believe that Dhandapani could have given money to his father and forcibly chases away Dhandapani, while he is also later betrayed by Karthi. Later, he learns that Dhandapani paid 35 lakhs for the shop from the registrar. Finally, Dhandapani succeeds in getting a new shop and setting up his supermarket.

== Cast ==
- Karunas as Dhandapani (nickname Ambani)
- Navneet Kaur as Nandhini
- Kota Srinivasa Rao as Annachi
- Cochin Haneefa as Nandhini's father
- Sriranjani as Nandhini's mother
- Shankar as Karthi, Dhandapani's assistant
- Cheran Raj as Kishore, Annachi's son
- Livingston as Johnson
- Delhi Ganesh as Dhandapani's first house owner
- Nirosha as Ranganayaki, and Dhandapani's second house owner
- Singamuthu as House Broker
- T. P. Gajendran as Police Inspector
- Chaams as Bank Cashier
- Mayilsamy as Cellphone Person
- Appukutty as Dhandapani's neighbour
- Nellai Siva as Head Constable
- Sindhya
- R. Sundarrajan
- Lollu Sabha Balaji
- Swaminathan
- Ragasya in a special appearance
- Grace Karunas in a special appearance
- Sridhar in a special appearance ("Poo Pookkum")

== Soundtrack ==
Soundtrack was composed by Karunas.

- "Othakallu" - Samshudeen, Grace Karunas,Rahna Jack, Mcloga, Chinna Ponnu
- "Poo Pookkum" - Iraj Weerarathna, Grace Karunas
- "Soru Vechen" - Karthik
- "Kola Kolaya" - Rita
- "Dhanda Dhandapani" - Rahul Nambiar, Ken Karunas

== Reception ==
Rediff notes that "Ambasamudram Ambani is worth a watch." Sify wrote "Karunas a middle level comedian?s earnest and sincere attempt to turn hero with Ambasamuthiram Ambani falters due to a weak script. The film definitely has a nice, feel-good message but writer-director Ramnath?s script lets him down". Behindwoods wrote "Although AA moves at a lackadaisical phase, it sure is a lesson for people striving to achieve excellence through hard work. AA is a good moral story apt for a family outing".
