= Maanik =

2019 Indian film by Martyn

- Theatrical release poster
- Directed by: Martyn
- Produced by: M. Subramaniyan
- Starring: Ma Ka Pa Anand; Suza Kumar
- Cinematography: Mahesh Muthuswami
- Edited by: K M Riyaz
- Music by: Dharan Kumar
- Production company: Mohita Cine Talkies
- Release date: 4 January 2019
- Country: India
- Language: Tamil

Maanik is a 2019 Indian Tamil-language fantasy comedy film directed by Martyn and starring Ma Ka Pa Anand and Suza Kumar. Featuring music composed by Dharan Kumar and lyrics by Mirchi Vijay, the film began production in mid 2016 was released in January 2019.

== Plot ==
Set in the 1980s, A young man, Pasupathy meets a village landlord to work as an accountant. Then, he meets the landlord's daughter and they fall in love with each other. While they were romancing, the landlord caught both and he beat Pasupathy to death with a log. He awakens and realizes that he has come to heaven. With the help of a little goblin, who was good in character. He meets G, then he tells about the reason for love, he asked, "Is it wrong for falling in love?". G calls a girl to choose a Heaven or Hell to Pasupathy, in which he accepts Heaven. G and Pasupathy went on to discuss famous people who had died in the previous decade. While hearing a story, Pasupathy got hungry, G transforms river into milk and he gives a cup to Pasupathy, but he likes Badam Milk and G told him to transform the milk to Black Coffee, he tastes it and he feels dizzy. G mixes Reborn Syrup and he gives him another birth in 27 years to fulfill his wish.

The scene shifts to Tamil Nadu, the lady gives birth to a baby boy, when the saint announces that the baby was spirited and he said to kill the baby when all the family members are shocked and they decided to bring a baby. The lady carries a baby, covers a cloth and basket. Then the two men came to the river and they uncover it is a toy. Then the lady reveals that the baby was 'God Chosen Child' and the baby starts swimming in the river, swims all over the ocean and then the baby reached Kasimedu in Chennai. A fisherman goes fishing, he hears crying sound and saw a baby on a beach. He sends it to an orphanage, the people were discussed about a baby and they named as 'Maanik'. When he was 7, a young Maanik meets Jack who is also an orphan, they become friends and took care by the caretaker in the orphanage. In 2015, after winning IPL by Chennai Super Kings, Maanik, Jack and their friends got emotional when the caretaker committed suicide that Chennai Super Kings got banned and then Maanik decided to bring back Chennai Super Kings for his caretaker's wish. After leaving the orphanage, the kid gives the caretaker's precious things for cricket, so she was an ardent fan of Dhoni and also cricket.

After 2 years, Maanik and Jack live in a small house, he hears the news of 'MandaKotti' Saamiyar, to ask the problems to solve and their wish was getting back for Chennai Super Kings to achieve their success but Jack doesn't believe it. Before going to the temple, Jack wishes a birthday to Maanik in which he reached 27 years of age. He went to the temple, 'Mandakotti' Saamiyar tells all the problems to other people and finally, he calls Maanik about his personal problems and asks solutions for him. Jack helps Maanik to impress the girl when she cries and Jack got an idea, he puts green chili to Maanik's mouth and he asks a girl if she lost a level of Candy Crush game, she gives mobile to him that the 'Mandakotti' Saamiyar appears on the phone, he spits and wipes, he gives to her phone and she saw that level is won. She said thanks to Maanik and become friends. One day, Manik meets a girl in a restaurant, she proposes, Jack asks her to call her father and suddenly the news appears that her father died and rushes emotionally. Manik remembers 'Mandakotti' Saamiyar told, "If the girls say "I Love You", then their fathers will die.", Jack advises Maanik that they will get the chance of Chennai Super Kings.

Jack goes to a tea stall to drink a cup of tea, a North-Indian man came to call his partner in a phone that his father-in-law watches porn films and roams like a king. A man tries to kill his father-in-law and get his property. Jack calls him to solve the problem and Maanik asks the idea to kill and get money. A North Indian man asks the details of his house, address, and his wife also. His father-in-law is named Roshan Lal, who lives in Sowcarpet and he has one daughter named Jeera, who is married to a North Indian man and they planned to kill Roshan Lal.

The next day, Manik disguises as a cable operator and he meets Jeera to repair a DVD Player, he dances with Jeera in 3 steps when she got hip pain and falls in love. One night, Jeera calls Maanik while her father watching a porn film and she proposes to him, suddenly her father died. They give property to a North Indian man and they become rich.

A few months later, Maanik and Jack went to a luxurious bungalow to stay. They went to the bedroom and they saw 'Mandakotti' Saamiyar's picture and photo necklace, but Maanik feels embarrassed to see this. Jack brings a schoolboy and asks his problem to Maanik about love. A boy is in 9th std, falls in love with an 11th std girl, who is elder than him. Manik introduces a boy named Honey and he told him to give the money after the solution.

Manik and Jack were in school to meet an 11th std girl named Maya, but he meets Keerthi, who was a teacher in the same school. When a girl is stuck with her shawl on a bike, but Maanik saves a girl with the help of Bonda and everybody praises him, Maya and Keerthi start expressing their love for Manik. How does the crux transpires to the story?

== Cast ==
- Ma Ka Pa Anand as Pasupathy/Maanikyam
- Suza Kumar as Keerthi
- Manobala
- Yogi Babu as Research and Analysis Wing officer
- Vathsan Veeramani as Jack
- Anu Anand as Maya
- Aruldoss as Goon
- Jangiri Madhumitha as Jeera, Roshan Lal's daughter

== Production ==
In June 2016, it was announced that newcomer director Martyn would make a film titled Maanik featuring Ma Ka Pa Anand and Suza Kumar in the lead roles. The film's title was taken from the character portrayed by Rajinikanth in Baashha (1995). The film began production at the AVM Studios in Chennai during June 2016.

== Soundtrack ==
Soundtrack was composed by Dharan Kumar. The audio was released under the label Saregama.

Maanik

Soundtrack album by Dharan Kumar
- Released: 2018
- Genre: Feature film soundtrack
- Language: Tamil

Dharan Kumar chronology
Abhiyum Anuvum (2018)	Maanik (2018)	Zhagaram (2019)

- "Ucha Pasanga" - Vaikom Vijayalakshmi
- "Ada Paavi" - Shashaa Tirupati
- "Mama Marugaya" - Ma Ka Pa Anand, Mirchi Vijay

== Reception ==
The Indian Express wrote "Maaniik promised to be a romantic fantasy love story. The fantasy portions are noteworthy, no doubt, but everything else, including the humour, is mediocre at best". Times of India wrote "Maanik would have been a decent fun ride had the screenplay been a little better with convincingly written characters."
