= Rajkamal =

Indian actor

- Born: 29th August,1985
- Occupation: Actor
- Years active: 2003–present
- Spouse: Latha Rao
- Children: 2

Rajkamal is an Indian actor who has worked on Tamil films and television series. After making a breakthrough as an actor through television serials, he has worked on films including Sandikuthirai (2016) and Melnaattu Marumagan (2018).

== Career ==
Rajkamal was introduced as an actor by director K. Balachander in the television series Sahana, which was a sequel to the director's successful 1985 drama film, Sindhu Bhairavi. He subsequently collaborated with the director for eleven further series produced by Kavithalayaa Productions in the 2000s. In 2006, Rajkamal participated in the inaugural series of Jodi Number One, a dance reality show by STAR Vijay, alongside his wife Latha Rao. He also then appeared alongside his wife in the "Aaja Meri Soniye" song in Venkat Prabhu's Saroja (2008). During 2007, Rajkamal won a Film Fans Association award, after being adjudged as having the best male performance in television serials during 2006.

In 2014, Rajkamal appeared in the role of a bank security officer in K. S. Ravikumar's Lingaa. He shot for the film in four days in Hyderabad alongside Rajinikanth and Anushka Shetty, after successfully passing a screen test. Rajkamal actively stalled his television career to seek out film opportunities after signing Melnaattu Marumagan in late 2015. His first theatrical release as the lead actor was however the romantic drama film Sandikuthirai (2016), where he featured opposite debutant Manasa. The film was based on the menace of technology and also doubled up as a murder mystery. In Melnaattu Marumagan (2018), Rajkamal portrayed the role of a tour guide in Mahabalipuram who has an ambition to marry a foreign woman. Paired opposite Andreanne Nouyrigat, the film was shot throughout 2015 and 2016.

== Personal life ==
Rajkamal is married to fellow television actress, Latha Rao, and the pair have two daughters, Lara and Raga.

== Filmography ==
=== Television ===
Serials

Year	Title	Role	Channel
2003	Sahana		Jaya TV
2003–2004	Rekkai Kattiya Manasu		Raj TV
2003–2009	Anandham		Sun TV
2004	Roja	Tamizhnambi	Jaya TV
2004–2007	My Dear Bootham		Sun TV
2005	Selvi		Sun TV
2007–2012	Vasantham		Sun TV
2008–2009	Comedy Colony		Jaya TV
2009	Kalyanam		Sun TV
2012–2017	Bhairavi Aavigalukku Priyamanaval		Sun TV
2020–2023	Abhiyum Naanum	Saravanan	Sun TV
2022	Amman		Colors Tamil
2022–2023	Anandha Raagam	Santhosh	Sun TV
2023–2026	Sandhya Raagam	Shivaram	Zee Tamil

Shows

Year	Title	Role	Channel
2006	Jodi Number One	Participant	Star Vijay
2016	Anjarai Petti		Zee Tamizh
2020	Vanakkam Tamizha	Guest	Sun TV
2021	Vada Da	Himself	Sun Music
2021	Rowdy Baby	Contestant	Sun TV
2022	Vanakkam Tamizha	Guest	Sun TV

=== Films ===
Year	Film	Role	Notes
2006	Pachchak Kuthira	Bridegroom	
2008	Saroja	Himself	Special appearance
2013	Naveena Saraswathi Sabatham	Jayashree's brother	
2014	Lingaa	Camera operator	
2016	Sandikuthirai	Ravi	
2018	Melnaattu Marumagan	Sakthi	
2021	Kasada Thapara	Vaanathi's husband	Streaming release
2022	Pen Vilai Verum 999 Rubai Mattume	Aravind	
