= Sandade Sandadi =

- Movie Poster
- Directed by: Muppalaneni Shiva
- Written by: Chintapally Ramana (dialogues)
- Screenplay by: Muppalaneni Shiva
- Story by: Rajendra Singh Babu
- Produced by: Aditya Ram
- Starring: Jagapathi Babu; Rajendra Prasad; Sivaji; Urvasi; Raasi; Sanghavi
- Cinematography: B. Ramana Raju
- Edited by: K. Ramesh
- Music by: Koti
- Production company: Adityaram Movies
- Release date: 13 December 2002
- Running time: 149 minutes
- Country: India
- Language: Telugu

Sandade Sandadi (transl. Total Pleasantness) is a 2002 Telugu-language comedy film directed by Muppalaneni Shiva. It stars Jagapathi Babu, Rajendra Prasad, Sivaji, Urvasi, Raasi, Sanghavi, and music composed by Koti. The film was a remake of the Kannada film Kothigalu Saar Kothigalu (2001).

== Plot ==
Three besties, Chandu, Balu, and Kamesh, are vexed with their wives, Lakshmi, Vasundhara, & Priya, as their earnings are less. Hence, they decide to take a mass suicide that ends up securing a tycoon, Lakshmi Narayana / Lucky, who too attempted suicide because of bankruptcy. The guys help him straighten his business and earn a good salary. They all reside in apartments, and their family also share close intimacy. Fitting Parvati, the common servant of 3, shares with ladies beyond relation. She eagerly awaits her detached childhood crush, Raja. The three suffer as their wives do not allow them to have a marital life. Lakshmi is highly devotional and spends her days with vows. Vasundhara has time constraints and is a busy lawyer. Priya is a hotshot TV actress endearing the camera.

Besides, Lucky is confronted with a second issue as he betrothed his daughters Honey, Anju, & Manju nuptial with his close friend's sons. The three modern foreign returned fines are rapid and intended to let a love match. At that point, the three guide Lucky to employ three good-looking guys to infatuate his daughters. Later, they forge them as fraudulent so that the beauties realize love is trash and accept their father's proposal. Here, Lucky orders these three to do the roles they turn down and further accept due to the job threat. As of today, the three triumphs attract the lovelies, and the day arrives for ditching when Lucky is hostile toward them, which rages their ego. Moreover, they are habituated to five-star luxuries and find it discouraging. Ergo, they ploy to artifice Lucky by knitting his daughters.

Meanwhile, Fitting Parvati spots the husbands with their girlfriends and notifies their wives, which they do not believe due to their firm trust in men. Now the 3 be bribe Parvati, ruse to slay her via a goon, Pulan Raja. Stunningly, he turns into Parvati's beloved, and they mingle. From there, Parvati attempts several plays to crack the truth but to no avail. After a few comic incidents, Lucky discovers the three as foes and asks to discard the mission when they contradict, and he alerts the wives. Whereat, they play a counterattack when the 3 choose the darlings and quit them. Here, Lakshmi collapses, and Vasundhara & Priya land for the wedding of their husbands as witnesses at the registered office. Being conscious of Lakshmi's condition, the three rush to the hospital, divulging the actuality to the brides. Thus, enranged babes seek to kill them when Fitting Parvati discloses that their father is the true killer when they reform. At last, the husbands beg pardon from their wives after the soul-searching, and they do so. As well as Lucky also seeks forgiveness. Finally, the movie ends on a happy note with Lucky wedding his daughters with his friend's sons.

== Cast ==
- Jagapathi Babu as Chandu / Chandra Sekhar
- Rajendra Prasad as Balu / Balasubramanyam
- Sivaji as Kamesh
- Urvasi as Lakshmi Chandra Sekhar / Bondus
- Raasi as Lawyer Vasundhara Balasubramanyam
- Sanghavi as Priya Kamesh
- Sonali Joshi as Honey
- Sony Raj as Anju
- Swapna Madhuri as Manju
- Kota Srinivasa Rao as Lakshmi Narayana / Lucky
- Brahmanandam as Poolan Raja
- Ali as Divya's Assistant
- Surya as Priya's director
- Kovai Sarala as Fitting Parvathi
- Shravya
- Telangana Shakuntala as Kamesh's mother-in-law

== Soundtrack ==
Sandade Sandadi

Film score by Koti
- Released: 2002
- Genre: Soundtrack
- Length: 24:08
- Label: Aditya Music
- Producer: Koti

Koti chronology
Hai (2002)	Sandade Sandadi (2002)	Nuvve Nuvve (2002)

Music composed by Koti. Music released on ADITYA Music Company. The song "Avuna Avuna" is based on "Na Na Karke Pyar" from Hindi film Dhadkan (2000). The songs "Rave Rajakumari", "Hai Hai Teenage" and "Bondana" are based on songs from Kannada film Kothigalu Saar Kothigalu.

No.	Title	Lyrics	Singer(s)	Length
1.	"Avuna Avuna Premalo"	Samavedam Shanmukha Sarma	Tippu, Sujatha	4:27
2.	"Rave Raja Kaumari"	Krishna Sai	Raghu Kunche, Sandeep, Nitya Santhoshini	5:31
3.	"Sandade Sandadi"	Bhuvana Chandra	Sriram Parthasarathy, Kushi Murali, Hanumantha Rao	3:46
4.	"Yendhi Bai Yendhi Bai"	Sahithi	Shankar Mahadevan	4:38
5.	"Hai Hai Teenage Season"	Krishna Sai	Anuradha Sriram, Nithya Santhoshini	4:57
6.	"Bondanna Bajjinaa"	Pothula Ravikiran	Malgudi Subha, Radhika, Ganga	4:49
Total length:				24:08
