= Pettikadai =

2019 Indian film by Esakki Karvannan

- Poster
- Directed by: Esakki Karvannan
- Written by: Esakki Karvannan
- Starring: Samuthirakani; Veera; Chandini Tamilarasan; Varsha Bollamma; Arunothayan Laxmanan
- Cinematography: N. K. Ekambaram
- Edited by: Gopi Krishna
- Music by: Mariya Manohar
- Production company: Lakshmi Creations
- Release date: 22 February 2019
- Country: India
- Language: Tamil

Pettikadai Indru Vidumurai (lit. Corner shop on holiday today) also simply known as Pettikadai (lit. Corner shop) is a 2019 Indian Tamil sports drama film written and directed by Esakki Karvannan. The film stars Veera, Samuthirakani, Chandini Tamilarasan and Varsha Bollamma in the lead roles. The film released on 22 February 2019 alongside LKG and Kanne Kalaimaane.

The film received negative reviews from critics. It was criticized for its screenplay, execution, weak direction and regressive themes.

== Plot ==
A young doctor who comes to a village and finds an online supermarket suppressing small traders and decides to fight back.

== Cast ==
- Samuthirakani
- Veera
- Chandini Tamilarasan as Dwaraka
- Varsha Bollamma as Thangam
- R. Sundarrajan
- Rajendran
- Priya Ashmitha
- Sundar
- Dhinakar
- Arunodhayan Lakshmanan

== Soundtrack ==
1. "Sudalamada Saamikitta" - Shreya Ghoshal
2. "Aasaiya Aasaiya" - Shreya Ghoshal

== Reception ==
The Times of India awarded the film a rating of 1 out of 5 stars. It stated that the script operated on superficial, half-baked understandings of global trade, agriculture, and socio-political systems. It also noted that the filmmaking style made basic amateur home videos appear professional and called it a strong contender for the worst Tamil film of its release year.

The Indian Express described the film as a petty project packed with regressive ideologies. It noted that while the narrative was marketed as a social film targeting corporate exploitation, the screenplay spent its runtime beating around the bush without effectively addressing its central premise. Furthermore, it criticized several narrative choices, including instances of verbal abuse toward religious minority characters, objectification of female characters, and highly controversial statements that literacy drives Scheduled caste (SC) communities to move to urban areas and consequently results in the depletion of natural resources and advocates against providing them with fundamental infrastructure like roadways.
