= Andreanne Nouyrigat =

French actress (born 1990)

- Born: Andreanne Nouyrigat; France
- Occupations: French Actress, model
- Years active: 2015–present

Andreanne Nouyrigat, known professionally as Andreanne, is a French actress, who lives and works primarily in India. She has appeared in supporting and leading roles in Tamil cinema. She was a contestant on Cooku with Comali Season 4, a Tamil-language cooking show.

== Career ==
Andreane Nouyrigat was born in France, but settled and spent her childhood in Pondicherry, India from the age of six. For her higher studies, she returned to France and trained to become a veterinarian nurse, but later returned to India to attempt to enter the film industry. In 2000, Andreanne was an extra in the telefilm Passeur d'enfants set in Pondicherry and then later appeared in the French stageplays, La Jeune fille, le diable et le moulin (2001) produced by Olivier Py and Sketches (2004) by Jean-Philippe Ribes. She then played an extra in the "Athiradee" song in Shankar's Sivaji (2007) starring Rajinikanth and Shriya Saran. Post her studies, Andreanne began modelling for Indian companies such as Shelton Shirts, DVY photoshoot, Kumaran Silks Online, Vijaya Ganapathy Stores and Freshdesk amongst other opportunities. She also walked down the ramp for the designer, Chaitanya Rao, in 2014.

Andreanne then moved on to appear in Tamil films, often dubbing her own lines as she is familiar with the Tamil language. In 2013, she first shot for the low-budget films Kanden Kadhal Konden (2016) and Saalaiyoram (2016), but her first release was C. V. Kumar's Enakkul Oruvan (2015), where she featured as a friend of the character portrayed by Siddharth. She later notably played a ghost in the horror film Zero (2016), the comedy lead opposite Soori in the Sivakarthikeyan-starrer Rajini Murugan (2016) and a Russian woman in Rum (2017). Andreanne then portrayed her first lead role in the comedy film, Melnaattu Marumagan (2018) alongside Rajkamal. In the film, she played a foreigner from France and dubbed her own lines in Tamil.

== Filmography ==
=== Films ===
Year	Title	Role(s)	Language(s)	Notes
2007	Sivaji	Dancer	Tamil	Uncredited
2015	Enakkul Oruvan	Marti	Tamil	
2016	Rajini Murugan	Andrea	Tamil	
2016	Zero	Lilith	Tamil	
2016	Kanden Kadhal Konden	Ashwini's friend	Tamil	
2016	Saalaiyoram	NGO worker	Tamil	
2016	Veera Sivaji	Foreign lady	Tamil	
2017	Rum	Russian lady	Tamil	
2018	Melnaattu Marumagan	Andreanne	Tamil	Lead

=== Television ===
Year	Show	Role	Channel	Notes
2023	Cook with Comali Season 4	Contestant	Star Vijay	4th Runner-up
