= Panjumittai =

- Theatrical release poster
- Directed by: S. P. Mohan
- Written by: S. P. Mohan
- Based on: Kalaru by S. P. Mohan
- Produced by: Ramesh KV; S.Ganesh; Vinodh Kumar
- Starring: Ma Ka Pa Anand; Nikhila Vimal; Sendrayan
- Cinematography: Magesh K Dev
- Edited by: Ram Sudharsan
- Music by: D. Imman
- Production company: Deepam Cinema
- Release date: 1 June 2018
- Running time: 140 minutes
- Country: India
- Language: Tamil
- Budget: ₹ 14.3 lakhs
- Box office: est. ₹ 2.1 lakhs

Panjumittai (transl. Cotton candy) is a 2018 Indian Tamil language fantasy comedy film written and directed by debutant S. P. Mohan (also known as Sengoda Mohan) and produced by Ramesh KV, S. Ganesh and Vinodh Kumar. The film has Ma Ka Pa Anand and Nikhila Vimal in the lead roles, while Sendrayan, Pandiarajan, Pandu and Vidyullekha Raman play supporting roles. D. Imman composed the music for the film, which was based on the short film Kalaru. The film concluded production in July 2015, and was released on 1 June 2018.

== Plot ==
Appu, a married man, begins to suspect his close friend Kuppu having an affair with his wife Ranji, as he finds both of them sharing similar interests.

== Cast ==
- Ma Ka Pa Anand as Appu
- Nikhila Vimal as Ranji
- Sendrayan as Kuppu
- Pandiarajan as Psychiatrist
- Pandu
- Vidyullekha Raman
- Bharathimani
- Thavasi as Ranji's father

== Soundtrack ==
The soundtrack was composed by D. Imman.

All lyrics are written by Yugabharathi; all music is composed by D. Imman.

No.	Title	Singer(s)	Length
1.	"My Wifeu Romba Beautifulu"	Diwakar	4:13
2.	"Manasula Irukkudhu Aasai"	Sarath Santhosh, Chinmayi	4:27
3.	"Colouru Colouru"	Jayamoorthy, Kalyan	2:25
4.	"Yenakku Mattum Yaen"	Chinna, Badava Gopi	4:09
5.	"Yenjottu Payalae Unna"	Diwakar	2:49
6.	"Kaattu Karuvamulla"	T. L. Maharajan, Nithyasree Mahadevan	3:15
7.	"Manasula Irukkudhu Aasai" (Karaoke)		4:26
8.	"My Wifeu Romba Beautifulu" (Karaoke)		4:13
Total length:			29:57

== Release and reception ==
Panjumittai was released on 1 June 2018. The Times of India rated the film 1.5 out of 5 stars. The Indian Express rated it 3 stars out of 5, writing, "Panjumittai is a throwback to the wonderful, sweet escape a cinema hall offered in the past, but in its existing problematic form, also turns out to be a stark reminder of how artificiality can leave a bitter aftertaste."
