= Ambani Shankar =

Indian actor

- Born: K. Sankaranarayanan; 17 May 1988 (age 38); Thirumangalam, Madurai district, Tamil Nadu, India
- Occupations: Actor, comedian
- Years active: 2005–present
- Spouse: Monika Nandini

K. Sankaranarayanan, professionally known as Ambani Shankar is an Indian actor and comedian, who has appeared in Tamil films. He has appeared in films including Ji (2005) and Ambasamudram Ambani (2010), and garnered his stage name from the latter film.

== Career ==
Shankar grew up in Tirumangalam, Madurai and was inspired by the success of actor Vadivelu, which prompted him to move to Chennai to pursue acting in 2004. Unable to get a breakthrough in films, he began working as a clerk at K. Bhagyaraj's office and was first spotted by N. Linguswamy to feature as a road-side cycle mechanic in Ji (2005). He continued to feature in small comedic roles in films including Indiralohathil Na Azhagappan (2008) and Kuselan (2008).

Shankar made a breakthrough with his performance in Ambasamudram Ambani (2010), portraying a negative role alongside Karunas. Rediff.com praised his portrayal and stated "Shankar, has delivered an outstanding performance" and that "he laughs, cries, delivers and receives blows and bouquets with perfect style, transforming himself into the role very convincingly". Likewise, Sify.com labelled him as a "good performer". He subsequently added "Ambani" as a prefix to his stage name.

In 2017, he featured in the Tamil Nadu State Para Badminton tournament and won a gold medal.

== Filmography ==
Year	Film	Role	Notes
2005	Ji		credited as Sankaranarayanan
2005	Aaru	Chinna	credited as Sankar Narayanan
2005	Anbe Vaa	young Nandha	
2006	Perarasu	Aishwarya's friend	
2007	Vallavan		
2007	Karuppusamy Kuththagaithaarar		
2007	Piragu	Samarasam's assistant	
2008	Indiralohathil Na Azhagappan		
2008	Inbaa	"Saavi" Shankar's friend	
2008	Chakkara Viyugam	Kanna's friend	
2008	Kuselan		
2009	Padikkadavan		
2009	Sirithal Rasipen	Student	Uncredited role
2009	Vaigai		
2010	Ambasamudram Ambani	Karthi	
2010	Virunthali	Parthiban	
2012	Vilayada Vaa	Guna	
2012	Murattu Kaalai		
2012	Pandi Oliperukki Nilayam		
2013	Pattathu Yaanai		
2014	Pagadai Pagadai	Anjaneyulu	
2015	Kalai Vendhan		
2015	Athiradi		
2015	144		
2016	Nanaiyadhe Mazhaiye		
2016	Adra Machan Visilu		
2016	Pattathaari		
2016	Kodambakkam Kokila		
2017	Kanavu Variyam		
2017	Kaadhal Kaalam		
2017	Arasakulam		
2017	Savarikkadu	Master's troupe member	
2018	Gulaebaghavali	Maari	
2018	Pakka		
2019	Kanne Kalaimaane	Kamalakannan's friend	
2019	En Kaadhali Scene Podura		
2019	Butler Balu		Uncredited role
2019	Udhay		
2020	En Sangathu Aala Adichavan Evanda		
2020	Draupathi	Bhai	
2020	Kombu		
2021	Michaelpatty Raja		
2021	Pushpa: The Rise		Dubbing artist for Raj Tirandasu (Tamil version)
2022	Bestie	Shankar	
2023	Theerkadarishi		
2023	Nandhi Varman		
2024	Rajakili	An orphanage inmate	
2026	Yaarra Andha Paiyan Naan Dhan Andha Paiyan		

== Television ==
Year	Film	Role	Channel
2024–2025	Thangamagal	Jalabi	Star Vijay
2026–present	Suttum Vizhi Sudare	Puli	Star Vijay
2026–present	Thai Maaman	Suruli	Star Vijay
