= Melnaattu Marumagan =

- Film poster
- Directed by: MSS
- Produced by: Mano Udhayakumar
- Starring: Rajkamal; Andreanne
- Cinematography: Goutham Krishna
- Edited by: Vijay Keerthi
- Music by: V. Kishorkumar
- Production company: Udhaya Creations
- Release date: 16 February 2018
- Running time: 134 minutes
- Country: India
- Language: Tamil

Melnaattu Marumagan (lit. 'Westernised Son-in-law') is a 2018 Tamil action film directed by MSS and produced by Mano Udhayakumar of Udhaya Creations. The film stars Rajkamal and Andreanne in the leading roles, with Lollu Sabha Manohar and Muthukaalai in supporting roles. V. Kishorkumar composed the original score and soundtrack for the film, while Goutham Krishna handled the cinematography. Having begun production in September 2013, the film had gone through production delays before being released on 16 February 2018.

== Cast ==
- Rajkamal as Sakthi
- Andreanne as Andreanne
- Lollu Sabha Manohar
- Muthukaalai

== Production ==
In September 2013, director MSS convinced television actor Rajkamal to play the lead role in his film on a Tamil tour guide falling in love with a tourist. MSS chose to make Melnaatu Marumagan after his debut project Neengatha Ennam starring Bhanu Chander's son Jayanth, was shelved. Melnaatu Marumagan was to be produced by Bahadur Sha, with music by Kishore Kumar and cinematography by Gautham Krishna. Andreanne Nouyrigat, a resident of Pondicherry who has appeared in Tamil cinema, was then recruited to star in the lead role alongside Rajkamal. In the film, she dubbed her own lines in Tamil.

The film was completed by January 2015, but a potential release date in February 2015 was bypassed. Following three years of delays and a change of producer, the team began promotions planning to release the film in early 2018. The team also announced plans of potentially releasing the film in France.

== Release ==
The film was released on 16 February 2018 across Tamil Nadu. In their review of the film, critic Suganth of The Times of India gave the film 0.5 stars out of 5, adding "it is the kind of film that makes you wonder why it was made in the first place and for whom". The critic added "and the all-round bad acting only makes it worse" and "by the time we reach the interval point, you stop worrying about the movie’s existence and start questioning your own".

== Soundtrack ==
Melnaattu Marumagan

Soundtrack album by V. Kishorkumar
- Released: 22 August 2015
- Genre: Film soundtrack
- Label: Auro Music

The film's music was composed by V. Kishorkumar. The soundtrack was released on 22 August 2016 through Auro Music. The song "Yaroival" was written by lyricist Na. Muthukumar within thirty minutes on a car journey he had to Chennai airport.

Track listing
No.	Title	Lyrics	Singer(s)	Length
1.	"Yaroival"	Na. Muthukumar	Karthik	4:56
2.	"Thavilu"	Akkatti Arumugam	Akkatti Arumugam	3:58
3.	"Pathukilo"	Nanchil Rajan	Jiththin, Anitha	5:39
4.	"Kattividavaa"	MSS	Mukesh, Anitha	4:20
