= Saalaiyoram =

2016 Indian Tamil-language drama film directed by K. Moorthy Kannan

- Theatrical release poster
- Directed by: K Moorthy Kannan
- Written by: K Moorthy Kannan
- Produced by: Murugan Subbarayan
- Starring: Raj; Serena; Pandiarajan; Singampuli
- Cinematography: Dhinesh Srinivas
- Edited by: R. S. Selwin
- Music by: S. Sethuram; Mariya Manogar (score)
- Production company: Smiley Productions
- Release date: 29 April 2016
- Running time: 82 minutes
- Country: India
- Language: Tamil

Saalaiyoram (transl. Roadside) is a 2016 Indian Tamil-language drama film written and directed by K Moorthy Kannan. The film stars Raj, Serena and Pandiarajan in the pivotal roles. The film had its theatrical release on 29 April 2016.

== Plot ==
The storyline of the film depicts the life of a ragpicker and revolves around how the life trajectory of a girl changes when she falls in love with him. Coincidentally, she is pursuing a Doctorate of Philosophy in solid waste management.

== Cast ==
- Raj as Dharani
- Serena as Arthi
- Pandiarajan as J. G., Arthi's uncle
- Singampuli
- Kathaga Thirumavalavan
- Muthukaalai
- Boys Rajan
- Lollu Sabha Manohar
- Andreanne Nouyrigat
- Amirthalingam
- Mippusamy

== Production ==
The film project was announced by K Moorthy Kannan, who had previously served as an assistant to director P. Vasu. The filmmakers roped in newcomers Raj and Serena in the main lead roles, as both of them made film acting debuts through the film project. Veteran actor Pandiarajan was cast to play a negative role in the film, only one of two such roles in his film career, the other being in Anjathe (2008).

Director K Moorthy Kannan revealed that he received a source of inspiration in narrating a script for the direction of the film to elaborate about the struggles faced by waste collectors after reading a poem titled Peechaankai. The portions of the filming were shot predominantly in a dump yard in Gandhipuram, near Kannamapettai. The filmmakers faced difficulties in obtaining permission to shoot certain film portions.

== Soundtrack ==
The music was composed by S. Sethuram.

== Reception ==
Malini Mannath of The New Indian Express wrote that "A well-intentioned effort that has gone haywire thanks to its immature take, Saalaioram is at the most a stepping stone for a debutant maker". A critic from Samayam rated the film two out of five stars.
