= Atti (film) =

2016 Indian film by Vijayabhaskar

- Theatrical release poster
- Directed by: Vijayabhaskar
- Produced by: Jayakrishnan; Karthikeyan
- Starring: Ma Ka Pa Anand; Ashmitha
- Cinematography: Venkatesh Arjun
- Edited by: Rajesh Kumar
- Music by: Sundar C Babu
- Production companies: E5 Entertainments; Imaginary Missions
- Distributed by: Parinita Productions
- Release date: 7 July 2016
- Running time: 147 minutes
- Country: India
- Language: Tamil

Atti is a 2016 Indian Tamil-language comedy film directed by Vijayabhaskar, starring Ma Ka Pa Anand and Ashmitha in the lead roles. Featuring music composed by Sundar C Babu, who also distributes the venture, the film began production in mid 2014, and was released on 7 July 2016.

== Cast ==
- Ma Ka Pa Anand as Bava
- Ashmitha
- Ramki as Omprakash
- Rajendran
- Yogi Babu
- Aruldoss as Radha
- Ramachandran Durairaj as Mookuthi
- Mahanadhi Shankar as a police officer
- Azhagu
- Mippu
- Thangadurai
- Muthukumar as Munnusamy

== Production ==
Ma Ka Pa Anand signed the film during July 2014 before the release of his first acting venture, and began preparing for the role by observing how gaana singers in Chennai operate. However, by early 2016, the film had yet to release.

== Soundtrack ==
The soundtrack was composed by Sundar C. Babu.

Track listing
No.	Title	Lyrics	Singer(s)	Length
1.	"Atti Atti"	Vijayabhaskar	Vijay Sethupathi	0:55
2.	"Dalmanja Gilmanja"	Gana Vinoth	Ma Ka Pa Anand	1:58
3.	"Ayodhi Kuppam"	Vijaysagar	Senthil Dass	4:11
4.	"Lollipop Coffeebytu"	Gana Vinoth	Gana Vinoth	4:15
5.	"Gilli Bambaram"	Gana Vinoth	Senthil Dass, Gana Vinoth	2:54
6.	"Medhuvaga Naan"	Snehan	Suchith Suresan, Monisha	3:48
7.	"Kannum Kannum Paakadha"	Kavivarman	Sundar C. Babu	4:00
8.	"Yedhedho Pidikkuthe"	Kavivarman	Senthil Dass	1:30
Total length:				23:31

== Reception ==
Malini Mannath of The New Indian Express said the script lacks "uniformity and consistency, both in the etching of its screenplay and its storytelling method" and criticised the film's length.
