= Love You Bangaram =

- Directed by: Goverdhan Reddy
- Written by: Goverdhan Reddy
- Produced by: K. Vallabha; Maruthi
- Starring: Rahul; Shravya; Rajiv
- Cinematography: Gopinath
- Music by: Songs; Mahith Narayan; Score: JB
- Production companies: Creative Commercials; Maruthi Talkies
- Distributed by: Maruthi Movies
- Release date: 24 January 2014
- Running time: 134 minutes
- Country: India
- Language: Telugu

Love You Bangaram (transl. Love you, gold) is a 2014 Indian Telugu-language romantic drama film written and directed by Goverdhan Reddy. It is produced by Maruthi Films. The film has Rahul and Shravya in the lead roles. The music director is Mahith Narayan, younger brother of noted Telugu music director, Chakri.

== Cast ==
- Rahul as Akash
- Shravya as Meenakshi
- Rajiv as Madan
- Shatru as Nag
- RGV Shanker as Songaseenu
- Ravi Prakash as Police officer
- Trisha Dantala
- Sasi Kumar Rajendran
- Eswara Uday Sai Kiran
- Maruthi as Manager
- Sanjjana (special appearance in the song "Aaja Nachale")

== Soundtrack ==
Love You Bangaram

Soundtrack album
- Released: November 2013
- Recorded: 2013
- Genre: World Music
- Label: Shreyas Music
- Producer: Mahith Narayan

The songs for this film has been composed by Mahith Narayan. Audio of the film was launched on 24 November 2013.

Song title	Singers	Duration	Lyricist
"Jai Shambo Shambo"	Tippu, Mirchi Ajay, Dharani	04:07	Kasarla Shyam
"Rendu Kallu Saalavata"	L. V. Revanth, Sudheeksha	04:38	Kandikonda
"Virisina Kaluvalu"	Hari	02:41	Mahith
"Nuvve Naatho"	Sri Ramachandra, Sravana Bhargavi	04:17	Mahith, Govi
"Aaja Nachale"	Bhargavi Pillai	02:24	Ram Pydisetty
"Annuvanuvuna Cheliya"	Vasu	04:19	Kasarla Shyam

== Reception ==
It received negative reviews upon its release and was a disaster at the box office.
