= Zero (2016 film) =

2016 Indian film by Shiv Mohaa

- Theatrical release poster
- Directed by: Shiv Mohaa
- Written by: Shiv Mohaa
- Produced by: Balaji Kappa
- Starring: Ashwin Kakumanu; Sshivada
- Cinematography: Babu Kumar.I.E.
- Edited by: R. Sudharsan
- Music by: Nivas K. Prasanna
- Production company: Madhav Media
- Release date: 25 March 2016
- Running time: 141 minutes
- Country: India
- Language: Tamil

Zero is a 2016 Indian Tamil-language science fiction horror film written and directed by Shiv Mohaa. The film stars Ashwin Kakumanu and Shivada, while J. D. Chakravarthy, Ravi Raghavendra, Dr. Sharmila, Andreanne and Tulasi play supporting roles. Filming began in June 2014 and lasted till March 2015, and the film had a worldwide theatrical release on 25 March 2016.

== Plot ==
The movie starts off with the story of how God created Adam and Eve. Then, the screen moves to the present as a newly wedded couple, Balaji alias Bala (Ashwin Kakumanu) and Priya (Shivada), move into their new apartment. Bala's father Vijay Kumar (Ravi Raghavendra) does not approve of the marriage because of a history of mental illness in Priya's family. Her mother (Lintu Rony) had gone mad after she was pregnant with Priya and died giving birth to her. But Bala accepts Priya even after knowing her past, due to the great love he has on her. After moving into their new home, the young couple visits a store where Priya takes some lipsticks without paying and claims that she does not remember taking them. She argues with the security guard and is forced to leave. After returning home and refusing to meet Bala's visiting father, she shares her past with her neighbour and tells how she cannot get pregnant. Later that night, Priya dreams about her mother and talks to her about how everyone today called her a thief, and initially reluctant, she accepts that she stole the lipstick and explains that how she has an affinity towards the colour pink and how she enjoys it.

After that, she soon enters a world where her mother is and starts sleepwalking at night. This is the part where weird and eerie things begin to happen around her, and she starts seeing illusions and becomes almost mad and stabs Bala one day. She gets stuck into the world where her mother is and Lilith, a Biblical demon (Andreanne) starts to roam freely after taking over the body of Priya. Bala searches for Solomon (J. D. Chakravarthy), an occult specialist who has the supernatural ability to speak with ghosts, and explains the situation to him. Solomon confronts the possessed Priya, and when Priya/Lilith touches Solomon, he sees everything about the being called Lilith who was created before Eve at the beginning of the time with Adam and how when Lilith rebelled and abandoned Adam did God create Eve as Adam's better half. God had cursed Lilith for abandoning Adam with the inability to have a child, and Lilith conceived so many times with the devil's child, but every child was dead or stillborn, and she finally becomes a hateful spirit who, over the time as a spirit, tortured and caused pregnant women to miscarriage, and kill themselves and trapping their soul in her spirit world, and Priya is the only child to escape her death, and now she wants to destroy the world as part of devils' bidding.

It is revealed that the Devil himself, in the form of a snake, has sent Lilith to carry his mission to destroy the world. Since Bala is a hindrance in her mission, she decides to kill him, but the Devil suggests that since Lilith resides in Priya's body and if Lilith touches Bala, her powers will be lost, as Priya and Bala have been soulmates for the past seven births and their love is more stronger than Lilith. Solomon explains the situation to other priests, and three exorcists from different parts of the world come together to challenge Lilith, but they eventually fail. When Lilith tries to choke Bala, he touches her, and Priya starts to remember all the times they spent together and gets unpossessed and returns to the real world where Balaji and Solomon are, and when Lilith is about to possess Priya again, God freezes the time and saves the world, and God blesses Priya with pregnancy. It is then revealed that the God chose the couple to be the parents of his child and also destroys Lilith permanently. The film ends with the Devil in the form of a snake, taking his usual form of a giant human and vowing to complete his mission by himself, hence hinting at a possible sequel, Zero-2.

== Cast ==
- Ashwin Kakumanu as Balaji alias Bala
- Sshivada as Priya / Lilith (present)
- J. D. Chakravarthy as Solomon, an exorcist and occult specialist
- Ravi Raghavendra as Vijay Kumar, Balaji's father
- Lintu Rony as Priya's mother
- Tulasi as Priya's neighbour
- Andreanne as Lilith (past), the main antagonist as well as the satan
- Anoop as The Evil Giant and Snake
- Dr. Sharmila as Sharmila, Balaji's paternal aunt
- Krishna Kumar as Koran
- Carl A. Harte as Head Exorcist
- Gautam Vasudev Menon as the Narrator

== Production ==
Zero is the directorial debut of Arun Kumar. The film began production in June 2014 in Chennai. Many scenes were shot in Binny Mills. Filming was completed by mid-2015, with the film having moved to post-production.

== Soundtrack ==
Zero (Original Motion Picture Soundtrack)

Soundtrack album by Nivas K. Prasanna
- Released: 24 February 2016
- Genre: Feature film soundtrack
- Length: 25:46
- Language: Tamil
- Label: Think Music India
- Producer: Nivas K. Prasanna

Nivas K. Prasanna chronology
Sethupathi (2016)	Zero (Original Motion Picture Soundtrack) (2016)	Kootathil Oruthan (2016)

The soundtrack was composed by Nivas K. Prasanna.

Track listing
No.	Title	Lyrics	Singer(s)	Length
1.	"Uyire Un Uyirena"	Kabilan	Anirudh Ravichander	4:44
2.	"Veredhuvum Nijamae Illai"	Madhan Karky	Haricharan	5:07
3.	"Engae Ponnai"	Kabilan	Vijay Prakash, Neeti Mohan	5:38
4.	"You Are In My Heart"	Tyler Done	Natalie Di Luccio	5:54
5.	"Indha Kaadhal Illaiyel"	Kabilan	Nivas K. Prasanna	4:23
Total length:				25:46

== Release and reception ==
Zero was initially scheduled to release in November 2015, but ultimately released on 25 March 2016. The Hindu stated, "From a thrilling tale about a woman battling mental illness, the film, for all its signs of promise, reduces itself to another exorcism story." Deccan Chronicle gave it a 2.5/5 saying that it is "a thrilling ride into the unknown". The Times of India gave it a 3/5 saying that, "Zero is certainly that rare film where the audience is unsure where it will go next."
