= Goverdhan Reddy =

- Born: Mittapally, Siddipet, Telangana, India
- Occupation: Film director
- Years active: 2004–present

Goverdhan Reddy aka Govi is an Indian film director who works mainly in Telugu cinema. He is known for his work from the films Love You Bangaram and the Telugu–Tamil bilingual film Nayaki.

== Early life ==
Govi aka Goverdhan Reddy before coming into film industry completed his education in the field of law (LLB). He enrolled as advocate and later on due to his movie interest he went on to direct a short film called Drishti in 2004.

== Career ==
He released his first Telugu language short film Drishti (2004) was released at Ravindra Bharathi. His first feature film Love You Bangaram under Creative Commercials and Maruthi Talkies banners. The film has Rahul Haridas, Shravya in the lead roles. His second film was horror comedy bilingual film Nayaki starring Trisha released in Telugu and Tamil by July 2016.

== Filmography ==
Key
†	Denotes films that have not yet been released

Year	Film	Language	Notes
2004	Drishti	Telugu	Short-film
2014	Love You Bangaram	Telugu	
2016	Nayaki	Telugu	
2016	Nayagi	Tamil	
