= Ma Ka Pa Anand =

Indian actor and television presenter

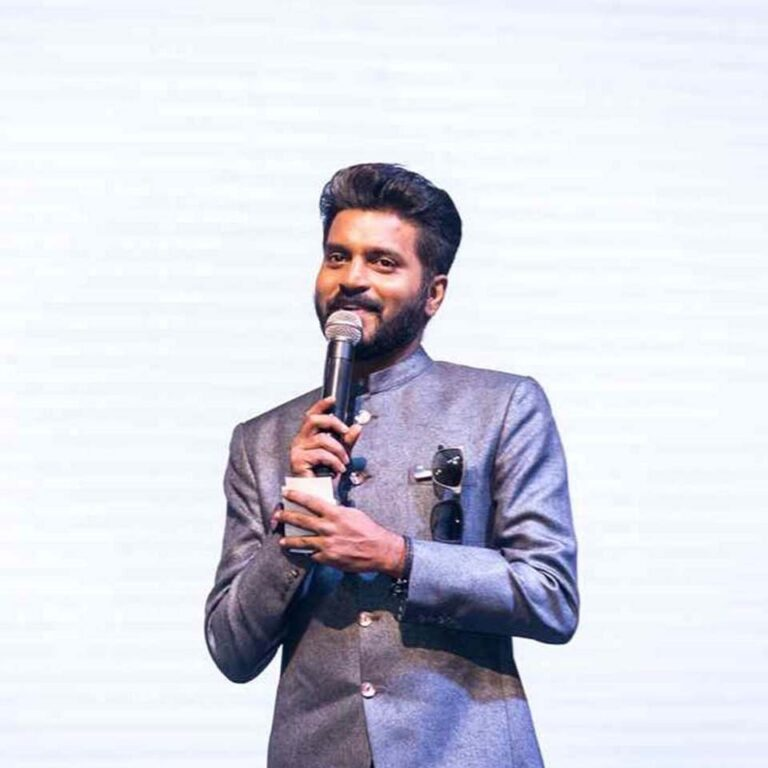
- Born: Anand Thillainayagam; 20 May 1981 (age 45); Puducherry, India
- Occupations: Radio Jockey, video jockey, television presenter, actor, singer
- Years active: 2011—present

Ma Ka Pa Anand is an Indian actor and television presenter. He has hosted Super Singer, Athu Ithu Ethu, Kings of Dance, KPY Champions, Mrs. Chinnathirai, The Wall, Cinema Kaaram Coffee, Start Music and Oo (yes)Solriya Oo Oohm (no)Solriya. Anand previously worked as a radio jockey at Radio Mirchi. He started his acting career with the film Vanavarayan Vallavarayan in 2014. He has hosted the show Athu Ithu Ethu after Sivakarthikeyan.

== Career ==
Anand worked as an RJ since 2005 before hosting the show Cinema Kaaram Coffee in Vijay TV. He later worked as a host for Super Singer and for Athu Ithu Ethu after Sivakarthikeyan left. Anand hosted many award functions on Vijay TV including the Vijay Television Awards and Mirchi Music Awards South. He was later cast as one of the leads in the rural-based film Vanavarayan Vallavarayan (2014). He went on to play the lead in several films including Panjumittai (2016).

== Television ==
- Adhu Idhu Edhu
- Cinema Kaaram Coffee (Star Vijay)
- Super Singer Junior(season 3-present)
- Super Singer (Tamil reality show)(2011-present)
- Super Singer T20
- Smart Wheel as Guest along with Dhivyadharshini
- Kings of Dance (season 2)
- Mrs. Chinnathirai
- Mr and Mrs Chinnathirai (1-4)
- The Wall (Tamil game show)
- Murattu Singles
- Ramar Veedu
- Start Music Season 3
- Bigg Boss (Tamil season 5) as Guest and to Support Priyanka Deshpande
- Sound Party 2.0
- Kalakka Povathu Yaaru? Champions (2017-2020)
- Anda Ka Kasam (2022-2024)
- Oo Solriya Oo Oohm Solriya (2022)
- Super Singer Season 9 (2022-2023)
- Super Singer Junior 9 (2023)
- Super Singer Season 10 (2023-2024)
- Cooku with Comali season 7 (2026)

== Filmography ==
Year	Film	Role	Notes
2014	Vanavarayan Vallavarayan	Vallavarayan	
2016	Navarasa Thilagam	Moorthy	
2016	Kadalai	Manickam	
2016	Atti	Bava	
2017	Meesaya Murukku	Himself	
2018	Panjumittai	Appu	
2019	Maanik	Maanik	
2019	Ispade Rajavum Idhaya Raniyum	Anand	
2023	Single Shankarum Smartphone Simranum	Vicky	
2026	Ram and Leela	Chinna Vandu	

== Discography ==
Year	Film	Song	Music composer	Notes
2016	Kadalai	"Aayava Kaanom"	Sam C. S.	
2016	Atti	"Dalmanja Gilmanja"	Sundar C. Babu	
2019	Maanik	"Mama Maruku"	Dharan Kumar	
