= Nayaki =

2016 Indian film by Goverdhan Reddy

- Telugu poster
- Directed by: Goverdhan Reddy
- Screenplay by: Brunda Ravindar. Murthy B. D. Rajasekhar Yadav
- Produced by: Giridhar Mamidipally; Padmaja Mamidipally
- Starring: Trisha Krishnan; Ganesh Venkatraman; Satyam Rajesh; Sushma Raj
- Cinematography: Jagadeesh Cheekati
- Edited by: Gautham Raju
- Music by: Raghu Kunche (songs); Sai Karthik (score)
- Production company: Giridhar Production House
- Distributed by: Sri Thenandal Films
- Release dates: 15 July 2016 (Telugu); 16 September 2016 (Tamil)
- Country: India
- Languages: Telugu; Tamil

Nayaki / Nayagi (/nɑːjəki/ transl. Heroine) is a 2016 Indian comedy horror film, directed by Goverdhan Reddy. The film stars Trisha Krishnan in the lead role, with Ganesh Venkatraman, Satyam Rajesh and Sushma Raj in supporting roles. The film, a Telugu-Tamil bilingual, is produced by Giridhar Mamidipally, who was the former manager of Trisha under Giridhar Production House, and has cinematography by Jagadeesh. Both versions of the film opened to negative reviews and became commercial failure at box office.

== Plot ==
Nayaki is about the soul of a woman named Gayathri. Since the 1980s this soul has been killing people in a village. Entry into this village has been restricted by the Government of India since people keep disappearing when touring the village. Why Gayathri has been haunting this village for the last 35 years forms the rest of the plot.

The film starts with Gayathri wondering to become a heroine and killing someone. The film shifts to a cafe where Sanjay, a director is sent to meet his rich would-be-fiancée. Then he meets a girl who is not rich but it is revealed that she is fooled by him and he made her fall for him. He takes her to an old bungalow with wrong intentions. But Gayathri who appears only in camera scares them and reveals his intention to her and Gayathri possesses her. Sanjay meets Gayathri's father's soul and he starts narrating why Gayathri hates this type of men.

She wanted to become an actress like Sridevi from childhood. One day when a director misbehaved with her, the camera man named Yogender helps her. He starts making her dreams true. She develops a liking towards him. But in reality Yogendhar is a womaniser who lusts Gayathri and in reality want to have sex with her in the name of love. But when her father learned of Yogender's character, Yogender raped Gayathri and brutally killed her father. It turns out both Gayathri and her father had survived as ghosts and the Goddess Bhadrakali possesses Gayathri. She kills Yogender in revenge and swears to kill any man who misbehaves with a woman.

The film shifts to present where now Sanjay feels sad and guilty. He hatches a plan to make her heroine. Gayathri enters another body and when another director does the same behaviour she slaps him. The film ends with the release of Gayathri's film and when asked about Gayathri in an interview, Sanjay replies that whenever there is wrongdoing she will return.

== Cast ==
- Trisha Krishnan as Gayathri
- Ganesh Venkatraman as Yogender
- Satyam Rajesh as Sanjay
- Sushma Raj as Sandhya
- Brahmanandam as Cameraman
- Jayaprakash as Gayathri's father
- Kovai Sarala as Saradha
- Manobala as Saradha's husband
- Sendrayan as Murali Krishna
- Siva Reddy as Subbayya
- Ashwanth Thilak
- Jeevi
- Kadambari Kiran
- Poonam Kaur in a guest appearance (Sravani)
- Nara Rohith as Aravind (guest appearance)

== Production ==
Nayaki in Telugu and Nayagi in Tamil was launched in AVM Studios on 20 August 2015 and the first look posters were revealed through the social medias. The film was shot simultaneously in both Tamil and Telugu languages. The film was shot extensively in Chennai. The first schedule was completed by the first week of September 2015.

== Soundtrack ==
The songs were composed by Raghu Kunche. Trisha, the lead actress of the film made her singing debut with the song "Bhayam".

Nayagi - Telugu Tracklist
No.	Title	Singer(s)	Length
1.	"Bhayam"	Trisha
2.	"Jai Bhadrakali"	Malavika, Hanuman
3.	"Idemito"	Chinmayi Sripada
4.	"Oh Sandhya"	M. L. Shruthi, Raghu Kunche

Nayaki - Tamil Tracklist
No.	Title	Singer(s)	Length
1.	"Bayam"	Trisha
2.	"Husarama"
