= Pagiri =

2016 Indian film by Esakki Karvannan

- Theatrical release poster
- Directed by: Esakki Karvannan
- Written by: Esakki Karvannan
- Produced by: Esakki Karvannan
- Starring: Prabhu Ranaveeran; Shravya
- Cinematography: Veerakumar
- Music by: Karunas (songs); S. N. Arunagiri (score)
- Production company: Lakshmi Creations
- Release date: 16 September 2016
- Country: India
- Language: Tamil

Pagiri (transl. WhatsApp) is a 2016 Indian Tamil-language romantic comedy film directed by Esakki Karvannan and starring newcomer Prabhu Ranaveeran and Shravya.

The film received generally negative reviews from critics, who criticized its weak execution, amateurish filmmaking that undermined the serious subject matter.

== Cast ==
- Prabhu Ranaveeran as Murugan
- Shravya as Madhu
- Ravi Mariya
- A. Venkatesh as Madhu's father
- T. P. Gajendran
- K. Rajan as a politician
- G. Marimuthu as a politician
- Adhira
- Rani as Murugan's mother
- Supergood Subramani as Murugan's father
- Saravana Subbiah as a police officer
- Vengal Rao
- Bava Lakshmanan
- Rani as Madhu's mother

== Production ==
The film is about the effects of WhatsApp and the predicaments of farmers.

== Soundtrack ==
The songs are composed by Karunas. The audio was released by Director Vasanthabalan.

All lyrics are written by Jeevan Mayil.

No.	Title	Singer(s)	Length
1.	"Kudi Kudi"	Karunas	4:01
2.	"Manasum Vayasum (Female)"	Grace Karunas	3:44
3.	"Kudi Kudi"	Jaya Murthy	4:01
4.	"Manasum Vayasum (Male)"	Prasanna	4:14
Total length:			16:00

== Release and reception ==
The film, along with Sadhuram 2, was only released at 6pm at Chennai on 16 September due to the Kaveri River water dispute.

The Times of India gave the film 2 out of 5 stars. It noted that while the central conflict had value, the actual "filmmaking is at best TV serial-ish." It stated that the project "feels like a missed opportunity, especially at a time when farmers are fighting for water".

Deccan Chronicle gave a 2 out of 5 rating. It pointed out structural failures in the screenplay, writing that "having taken a serious script, the director has instead resorted to lackluster narration and murky scenes in the name of comedy." It also noted that this "shallow comedy undermines the impact it could have had".

A critic from The New Indian Express wrote that "The plot had the potential to turn into an interesting satire and the director has made an attempt to move away from a formulaic-setting too. But the lack of fizz and punch in the script has turned it into a mediocre fare".
