= Tamil Kudimagan =

2023 Tamil film

- Theatrical release poster
- Directed by: Esakki Karvannan
- Produced by: Nayanthara
- Starring: Cheran; Sri Priyanka; Lal
- Cinematography: Rajesh Yadav
- Edited by: Karthik Ram
- Music by: Sam C. S.
- Production company: Lakshmi Creations
- Release date: 7 September 2023
- Running time: 122 mins
- Country: India
- Language: Tamil

Tamil Kudimagan (transl. Tamil citizen) is a 2023 Indian Tamil-language film directed by Esakki Karvannan and starring Cheran and Sri Priyanka in the lead roles. It was released on 7 September 2023.

== Plot ==
Chinnasamy resides in Sendhipatti with his mother Vellaiyammal, wife Parvathy, and younger sister Valli. As a member of the laundering community, he is responsible for washing the villagers' clothes and performing the last rites for the deceased. He deeply believes in the importance of education, which he hopes will alleviate the disrespect he faces due to his social status and profession. His aspiration is to become a government servant, leading a life with basic respect and dignity. However, he is deceived by upper-caste men into performing the last rites of a deceased person, causing him to miss his VAO exam.

Chinnasamy's sister, Valli, a medical student, is in love with the son of Sudalaiyandi, a staunch casteist. Disillusioned with his profession, Chinnasamy leaves it behind and starts a new venture, earning a living by raising cattle and selling milk. Nevertheless, upper-caste men sabotage his business, influencing fellow casteists to boycott his milk. Gandhi Periyar, who had previously killed his own daughter for loving a lower-caste boy, has transformed into a reformed person and now supports and motivates Chinnasamy to persevere with his dairy business. Once Sudalaiyandi and his cohorts spot his son accompanied by Valli, they mercilessly attack her in front of his son. Chinnasamy arrives at the scene, but can only cry helplessly as he witnesses his sister's ordeal.

Six months later, Sudalaiyandi's father, Pechimuthu, passes away. Chinnasamy is summoned to perform the last rites, but he declines, citing self-respect. Sudalaiyandi then sends his brother-in-law, Esakki, to fetch a last-rite performer from neighboring villages, but the effort proves futile. Enraged, Sudalaiyandi dispatches goons to attack Chinnasamy. However, when Sudalaiyandi himself arrives to confront Chinnasamy, his mother, Vellaiyamma, begs for mercy, falling at Sudalaiyandi's feet to spare her son's life. To protect his family, Chinnasamy flees the village and seeks refuge at the nearby police station. Unfortunately, the police inspector, a relative of Sudalaiyandi, falsely accuses Chinnachamy of theft and brutally thrashes him in the lockup.

Just in time, SP Anthonysamy arrives and rescues Chinnasamy. Sudalaiyandi threatens to mobilize his caste men to protest outside the police station if the SP does not compel Chinnasamy to perform the rituals. In response, the SP orders the police to take custody of Pechimuthu's body and store it in the mortuary. He also provides protection to Chinnasamy's family and issues a shoot-on-sight order against anyone who obstructs, thereby humiliating Sudalaiyandi. The case is subsequently transferred from the Tirunelveli court to the Madras High Court's Madurai bench. The village casteists unite to expel Chinnasamy's family from the village, but the police intervenes to stop them.

Three months later, the case comes up for hearing, where Chinnasamy petitions to be classified as caste-less, along with fellow Scheduled Castes. Advocates engage in a heated debate on casteism, reservation, and related discriminations. The judgment favors Chinnasamy, declaring it his personal right to choose whether or not to perform rituals, and suggesting that such tasks be performed by individuals from within their own community. The judgment further states that profession is an individual identity, not a caste identity. Sudalaiyandi, unable to see his son performing last rites, requests a burial without rituals. Chinnasamy is later seen admitting his son to school, where he proudly fills in "Tamilkudimagan" as their caste in the admission form, as per the court's order.

== Cast ==
- Cheran as Chinnasamy
- Sri Priyanka as Parvathy, Chinnasamy's wife
- Lal as Sudalaiyandi
- Vela Ramamoorthy as Gandhi Periyar
- Aruldoss as Esakki, Sudalaiyandi's brother-in-law
- S. A. Chandrasekhar as Chinnasamy's advocate
- Rajesh as a judge
- Ravi Mariya as Sudalaiyandi's advocate
- Deepshikha as Valli, Chinnasamy's sister
- Mu Ramaswamy as Pechimuthu, Sudalaiyandi’s father
- Dhruvva as Sudalaiyandi’s son
- Sendrayan as a drunkard
- Mayilsamy as a public prosecutor
- Meenal as Gomathi, Esakki's wife

== Production ==
In December 2021, Cheran announced plans of collaborating with Esakki Karvannan on Tamil Kudimagan. Production was completed by the end of 2022, and a first look poster was released.

== Music ==
The music for the film was composed by Sam C. S.

Tamil Kudimagan

Soundtrack album by Sam C. S.
- Released: 10 August 2023
- Genre: Feature film soundtrack
- Length: 22:40
- Language: Tamil
- Producer: Sam C. S.

Sam C. S. chronology
RDX: Robert Dony Xavier (2023)	Tamil Kudimagan (2023)	Red Sandalwood (2023)

Track listing
No.	Title	Lyrics	Singer(s)	Length
1.	"Kadal Yendra"	Sam C. S.	Nellai Thangaraj	5:47
2.	"Sikkikitendi"	Sam C. S.	Kapil Kapilan, Pooja Venkat	3:39
3.	"Iraiva Idhuva"	Eknath	Ananthanarayanan	4:20
4.	"Katha Solla Poren"	Eknath	Sam C. S.	3:38
5.	"Thayaramma"	Viveka	Velmurugan	5:16
Total length:				22:40

== Reception ==
The film was released on 7 September 2023 across theatres in Tamil Nadu.

Logesh Balachandran of The Times of India rated the film 2.5 out of 5 stars, stating that the director drove home his message with the "subtlety of a sledgehammer" and "TV soap opera-ish filmmaking". He added that the film "struggles a bit to engage its audience" due to an underwhelming and surface-level screenplay that required much better writing to truly leave an impact.

Avinash Ramachandran, a critic from Cinema Express noted "this film asks the right questions, but the answers aren't all right".
