= Rathan Mouli =

Indian film actor

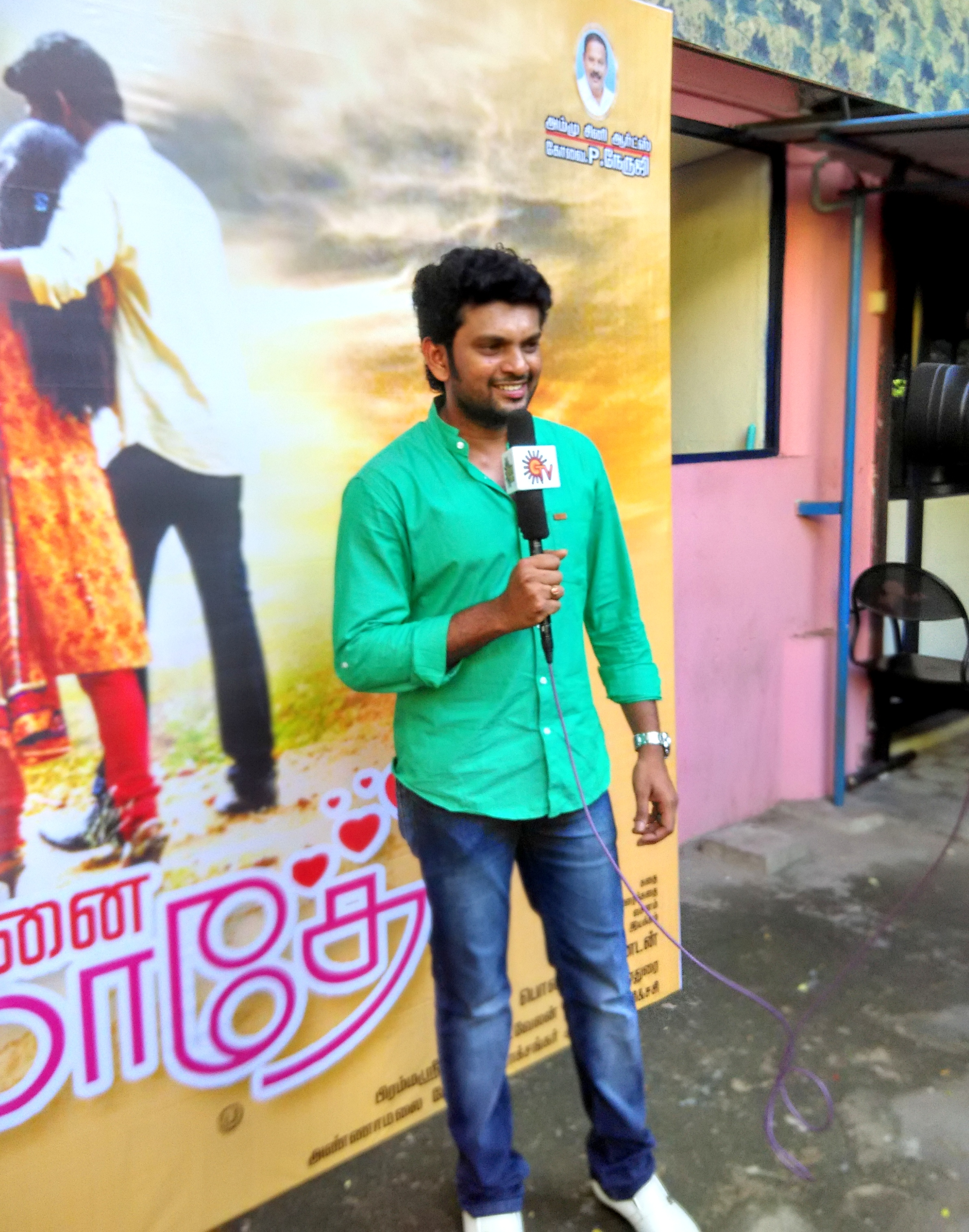
- Born: 6 June; Tamil Nadu, India
- Occupation: Actor
- Years active: 2010–present

Rathan Mouli is an Indian actor who has appeared in Tamil language films.

== Career ==
Rathan Mouli made his lead acting debut in Unnaiye Kadhalipen (2010), before going on to work in Parameshwar's Karumpuli (2013) and Anand's Theal. While the first film went largely unnoticed, Karumpuli (2013) gained attention prior to release after the Censor Board had recommended several changes owing to its story on terrorism. Rathan Mouli then collaborated with director Pughazhmani on back-to-back horror films, 13 aam Pakkam Parkka (2015) opposite Sri Priyanka and the horror comedy Vellikizhamai 13am Thethi (2016) opposite Suza Kumar.

His first release in 2017 was the rural action film Arasakulam, while his latest films include the unreleased Yennai Priyadhey which began production in 2013, Malli and Sei (a) Sethumadi.

== Filmography ==
Year	Film	Role	Notes
2010	Singam	Jaishankar	
2010	Unnaiye Kadhalipen	Saravanan	
2013	Karumpuli	Salim	
2015	13 aam Pakkam Parkka	Dileep	
2016	Vellikizhamai 13am Thethi	Saravanan	
2017	Arasakulam	Muthupandi	
2018	Theal	Siva	
2018	Malli		
2018	Sei Allathu Sethumadi	Charles	
