= Suza Kumar =

Indian actress

- Born: Suza Kumar; Chennai, Tamil Nadu India
- Occupation: Actress

Suza Kumar is an Indian actress who has appeared in Tamil language films.

== Career ==
Born in Chennai, Suza Kumar initially pursued a diploma in cinematography at the New York Film Academy and then a filmmaking course at the SAE Institute in Singapore, before returning to India. She subsequently moved into modelling, before receiving an offer from Wunderbar Films to work as an actress. She made her debut in Ethir Neechal, where she portrayed a brief role as Sivakarthikeyan's first love interest. She was featured in the song "Nijamellam Maranthu Pochu" and won notice from critics for her role in the film. She had a small role in Siva's Veeram (2014), starring Ajith Kumar.

She later starred in two horror films, namely Vellikizhamai 13am Thethi and Kanneer Anjali, both of which had smaller budgets than her first two films.

== Filmography ==
| Year | Film | Role | Notes |
|---|---|---|---|
| 2013 | Ethir Neechal | Kunjithapatham's love interest | |
| 2014 | Veeram | Senbagam | |
| 2015 | 13 aam Pakkam Parkka | | |
| 2016 | Vellikizhamai 13am Thethi | Malliga | |
| 2018 | Maanik | Keerthi | |

== See also ==
Lists of Tamil-language films
