= Samved (music group) =

Indian music group

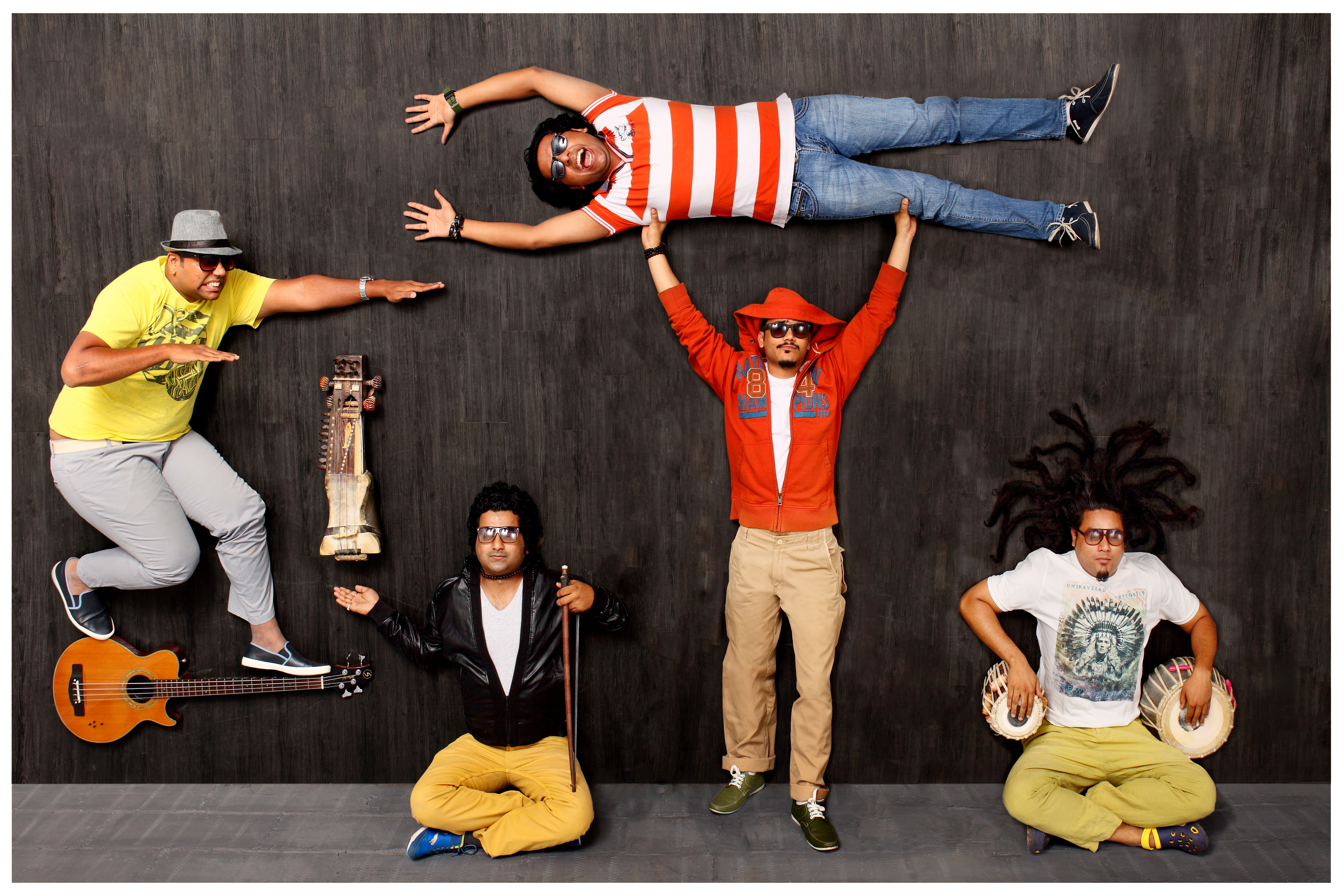

Background information
- Origin: Mumbai, India.
- Genres: Folktronica, fusion of Folk and Electronica
- Years active: 2013–present
- Label: Universal Music India
- Members: Ritvik Joe; KK; Zeeshan Khan; Sangeet Mishra; Kirti Das

Samved is an Indian Folk Fusion and Electronica (commonly referred to as Folktronica) band based in Mumbai. The band was formed in early 2013 when electronic artists and music producers Ritvik Joe and KK joined with performing musicians Zeeshan Khan, Sangeet Mishra, and Kirti Das.

In 2014, Samved signed with Universal Music Group and released their first studio album, RlungTa. They are among the few bands in the country to feature the Sarangi as a lead instrument in their compositions.

== Members ==
- Ritvik Joe – Music Producer, Electronic Artist, Guitars
- Abhijeet Hegdepatil – Music Producer, Electronic Artist, Pianist
- Zeeshan Khan – Vocalist
- Sangeet Mishra – Sarangi
- Kirti Das – Percussionist

=== Contributing musicians in acoustic sets ===
- Harish Sagane – Guitars
- Gautam Sharma – Percussions

== History ==
=== Collaborations ===
In 2014, French artist Christie Bourcq collaborated with Samved on their album Rlung Ta, performing on the tracks Infinite Days and Gyrating Solang. The following year, the band worked with the renowned sitar player Imran Khan from the Sikar Gharana, and vocalist Shruti Prakash on their single Moore Nain, released through Universal Music Group.

=== Kama Unit ===
The band's debut single Kama Unit was released under the label Universal Music Group in early 2014. The music video, directed by Shekhar Karalkar, was the first to combine light painting and stop motion animation in a music video production. The video helped establish the band's presence in the Indie Music space.

== Music style ==
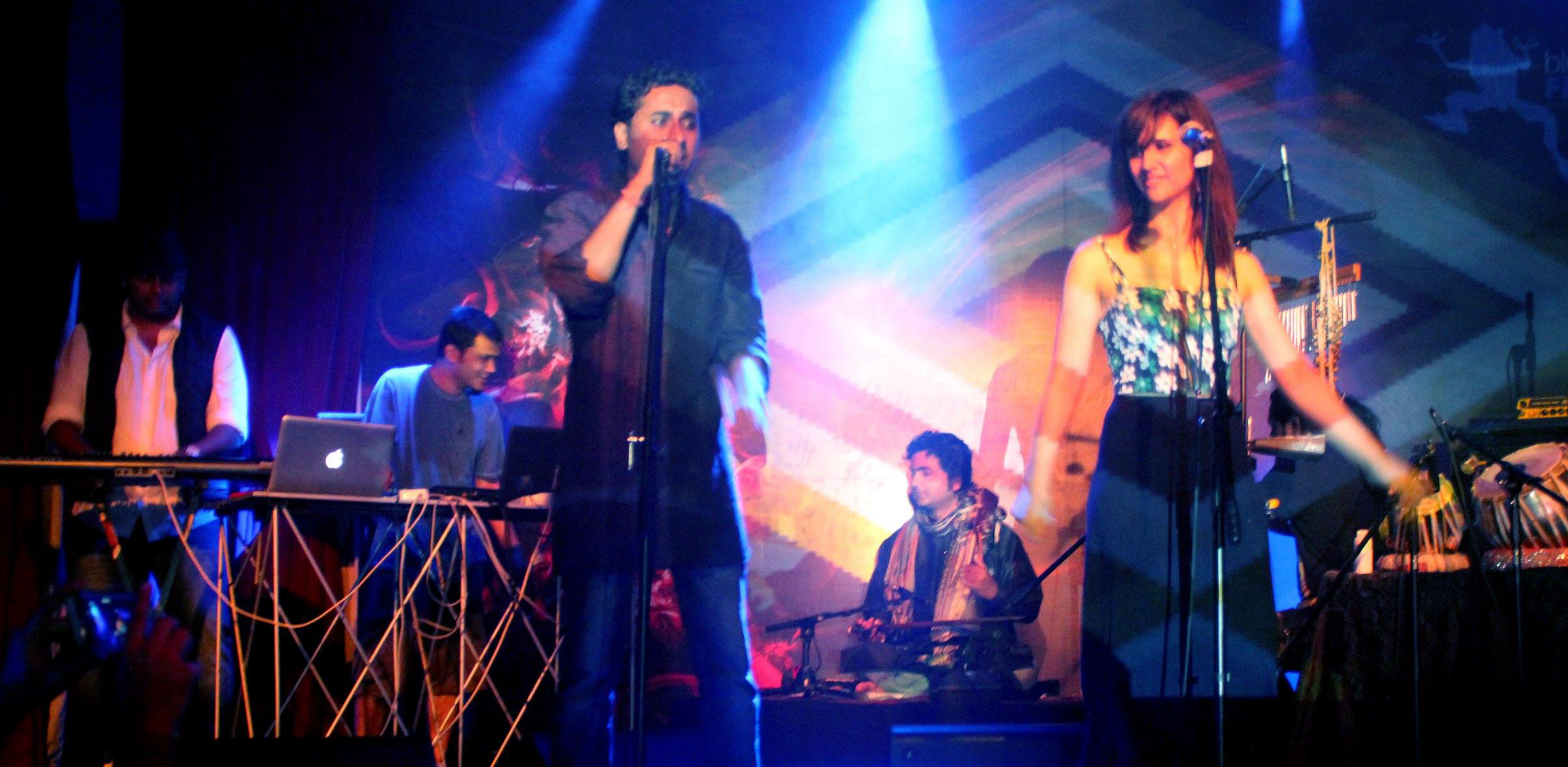
Samved Performing at Blue Frog

Samved's musical style is Electro Classical Fusion. Their music is a blend of Upbeat Industrial Electronica and Hindustani Classical. The band draws its inspiration from fusion acts like Anand Shankar and Talvin Singh. The band's name "Samved" is inspired for one of the four Vedas Samaveda. Samaveda is the Veda of Melodies and Sounds. The Indian Classical music and dance considers the melodies in Samaveda as one of its roots. Their logo is an ancient Indus valley dancing and performing arts symbol.

Samved performs electro-classical fusion music, also called Folktronica, combining upbeat industrial electronica with Hindustani classical music. The band draws inspiration from fusion artists like Anand Shankar and Talvin Singh. Their name "Samved" derives from the Samaveda, one of the four Vedas, which focuses on melodies and sounds and is considered foundational to Indian classical music and dance. The band's logo incorporates an ancient Indus Valley symbol representing dance and performing arts.

== Awards and nominations ==
Year	Nominated work	Award	Result
2013	Love Science (Single)	Radio City Freedom Awards Best Folk Fusion Artist of the year 2013.	Nominated
2014	Kama Unit (Single)	Radio City Freedom Awards: Best Folk Fusion Artist of the year 2014.	Won
2015	RlungTa (Album)	Indian Recording Arts Academy Awards (IIRA): Best Band Production (Album).	Won

== Discography ==
=== Albums ===
- RlungTa (2014)

=== Singles ===
- Kama Unit (2014)
- Moore Nain (2015)
- Raat Bhar (2016)
- Meera (2017)
