= Vikram Vedha (soundtrack) =

2017 soundtrack album by Sam C. S.

- Soundtrack cover

Soundtrack album by Sam C. S.
- Released: 19 June 2017
- Genre: Feature film soundtrack
- Length: 28:09
- Language: Tamil
- Label: Think Music
- Producer: Sam C. S.

Sam C. S. chronology
Kadalai (2016)	Vikram Vedha (2017)	Puriyatha Puthir (2017)

Singles from Vikram Vedha
- 1. "Tasakku Tasakku" Released: 5 June 2017; 2. "Yaanji" Released: 12 June 2017

Vikram Vedha is the soundtrack album of the 2017 Indian neo-noir action thriller film of the same name, directed by Pushkar-Gayathri, and produced by S. Sashikanth under the banner YNOT Studios, starring Madhavan and Vijay Sethupathi. The soundtrack album and the background score is composed by Sam C. S. with lyrics written by Mohan Rajan, Muthamil, Vignesh Shivan and the composer respectively. Sam had previously worked with Pushkar and Gayathri on television commercials, before they decided to recruit him, after his work on Puriyatha Puthir, which was his debut film.

The soundtrack album features 10 songs, with six instrumental compositions. The team released two singles "Tasakku Tasakku" on 5 June 2017 and "Yaanji" on 12 June 2017, before the entire album unveiled on 19 June 2017. The soundtrack received generally positive reception from critics.

== Development ==
Sam composed the score based on the script instead of doing it after watching the film's final version. He used the same approach for Puriyatha Puthir. He believed this would give him more creative freedom while also helping the actors and directors understand how to depict the emotions the characters portray in a particular sequence. In an interview with Kaushik LM of The Hindu, Sam said he "used ethnic Indian instruments, and live orchestra" to compose the score. He completed 80 percent of the score before the commencement of principal photography, leading Pushkar and Gayathri to shoot the scenes according to the music he composed. After shooting for the film ended, Sam fine-tuned the score to achieve better results.

Pushkar and Gayathri had initially opted against including songs in the film, but then thought lyrics might work better than music alone and changed their decision. Sam employed the vocal percussion technique of beatboxing for the track "Tasakku Tasakku" as he felt it would be better to use "real sounds" to depict the atmosphere in a bar. At Sethupathi's insistence, Vignesh Shivan was hired to write the lyrics for "Karuppu Vellai".

== Release ==
The audio rights of the soundtrack album were acquired by Think Music. The team released the first single "Tasakku Tasakku" on 5 June 2017, rendered by Mukesh, M. L. R. Karthikeyan, Sam C. S. and Gana Guna. Followed by the second single track, "Yaanji" on 12 June 2017, which is a melodius composition rendered by Anirudh Ravichander and Shakthisree Gopalan, with lyrics written by Mohan Rajan. The entire soundtrack album was unveiled through all streaming platforms on 19 June 2017.

== Track listing ==
No.	Title	Lyrics	Singer(s)	Length
1.	"Karuppu Vellai"	Vignesh Shivan	Sam C. S., Sivam	03:16
2.	"Yaanji"	Mohan Rajan	Anirudh Ravichander, Shakthisree Gopalan, Sathyaprakash	04:30
3.	"Tasakku Tasakku"	Muthamil and Manikandan	Mukesh Mohamed, M. L. R. Karthikeyan, Gana Guna	04:00
4.	"Yethu Dharmam"	—	Chennai Orchestra	01:37
5.	"Pogatha Yennavittu"	Sam C. S.	Pradeep Kumar, Neha Venugopal	04:41
6.	"Ghetto Chase"	—	Meghavarshini, Avantika, Monisha, Chennai Orchestra	03:04
7.	"Idhu Emosion"	—	Chennai Orchestra	01:41
8.	"Yethu Nyayam"	—	Sam C. S., Chennai Orchestra	02:57
9.	"Sangu Sattham"	—	Sethu Thankachan, Kannan M, Ravikumar, Chennai Orchestra	00:58
10.	"Oru Katha Sollatta"	—	Sam C. S., Sethu Thankachan, Kannan M, Ravikumar, Chennai Orchestra	01:25
Total length:				28:09

== Background score ==
Vikram Vedha

Film score by Sam C. S.
- Released: 14 December 2017
- Genre: Feature film score
- Length: 32:42
- Language: Tamil
- Label: Think Music
- Producer: Sam C. S.

The original background score from the film, composed by Sam C. S. was released on 14 December 2017. It features 10 bonus original compositions, with six cues in the film (tracks 11–16) which were included in the film's soundtrack album.

No.	Title	Length
1.	"Vedha's Swag"	03:16
2.	"Vikram's Angst"	01:35
3.	"The Pursuit"	02:31
4.	"The Sorrow of Simon"	01:15
5.	"Vikram vs. Vedha"	03:11
6.	"Bygones"	01:59
7.	"Vikram Deciphers"	02:52
8.	"The Divide"	01:04
9.	"Vedha's Angst"	02:40
10.	"Vikram + Vedha"	00:40
11.	"Yethu Dharmam"	01:37
12.	"Ghetto Chase"	03:04
13.	"Idhu Emosion"	01:41
14.	"Yethu Nyayam"	02:57
15.	"Sangu Sattham"	00:58
16.	"Oru Katha Sollatta"	01:25
Total length:		32:42

== Reception ==
=== Critical response ===
Sharanya CR from The Times of India noted in her review that Sam "brings out the essence of the film’s plot" with "Karuppu Vellai", and used the term "stylish, yet flawless" to describe Anirudh's and Shakthisree Gopalan's rendition of "Yaanji". She felt "Pogatha Yennavittu" was "an impressive composition" and appreciated the "very peppy" beats in "Tasakku Tasakku", adding that it "can be reserved for parties". Sharanya concluded her review by stating that "the composer hits the high-note" with Vikram Vedha, writing further that "the film's narrative is sure to up the experience through music" with the instrumental tracks.

Vipin Nair of Music Aloud rated the album 3.5 out of 5, calling it an "excellent work" from Sam CS. Karthik Srinivasan of Milliblog wrote "After the unheard, under-rated, Sam hits the big league with Vikram Vedha". Priyanka Thirumurthy of The News Minute wrote "While the songs in the film don't really make an impression, music director Sam C.S stuns the audience with background scores that keep you hooked even when the screenplay dips." Anupama Subramanian of Deccan Chronicle wrote "Sam CS’ music, especially the background score is brilliant." Sreedhar Pillai of Firstpost described it as "great music and background score by Sam CS." Reviewer based at Sify wrote "Sam CS' score is undoubtedly the film's lifeline, his background score enhances each and every scene, particularly in the tense moments."

Baradwaj Rangan of Film Companion South added, "The music, though, takes itself very seriously. CS Sam produces a good album (Nee pogaadhey is just lovely), but his score is deafening, and it drowns out a lot of the dialogue." Ragesh Gopinathan from Malayala Manorama called Vikram Vedha as "one of those few films whose BGM thrills you so much that it reverberates in your ears even after the show ends." Vishal Menon of The Hindu described it as a "spellbinding soundtrack".

=== Accolades ===
Award	Date of ceremony (Note: Date is linked to the article about the awards held that year, wherever possible.)	Category	Recipient(s)	Result	Ref.
Ananda Vikatan Cinema Awards	10 January 2018	Best Playback Singer — Male	Anirudh Ravichander (for "Yaanji") (Note: Also for "Karuthavanlaam Galeejam" from Velaikkaran)	Won	
Filmfare Awards South	16 June 2018	Best Male Playback Singer – Tamil	Anirudh Ravichander (for "Yaanji")	Won	
Norway Tamil Film Festival Awards	26 January 2018	Best Music Director	Sam C. S.	Won	
Norway Tamil Film Festival Awards	26 January 2018	Best Playback Singer – Male	Anirudh Ravichander (for "Yaanji")	Won	
South Indian International Movie Awards	14 – 15 September 2018	Best Music Director – Tamil	Sam C. S.	Nominated	
South Indian International Movie Awards	14 – 15 September 2018	Best Male Playback Singer – Tamil	Anirudh Ravichander (for "Yaanji")	Nominated	
South Indian International Movie Awards	14 – 15 September 2018	Best Female Playback Singer – Tamil	Shakthisree Gopalan (for "Yaanji")	Nominated	
Techofes Awards	19 February 2018	Best Music Director	Sam C. S.	Won	
Techofes Awards	19 February 2018	Best Lyricist	Vignesh Shivan (for "Karuppu Vellai")	Nominated	
Vijay Awards	3 June 2018	Best Music Director	Sam C. S.	Nominated	
Vijay Awards	3 June 2018	Best Background Score	Sam C. S.	Won	

== Impact ==
Vikram Vedha established Sam C. S. as one of the prominent composers in Indian film industry. The reception for Sam's work, helped him garner numerous film opportunities which included high-profile films, such as Mohanlal's Odiyan (2018) and Madhavan's Rocketry: The Nambi Effect (2022), where he worked on the background scores. Pradeep Kumar of The Hindu listed Vikram Vedha as one of the 10 Tamil films during the 2010s had 'mass' music, indicating how Sam's background score elevated the character of Vedha. Sam also scored the Hindi remake of Vikram Vedha, reusing major themes from the original film and a song, while also composing new themes as well.
