= Kadikara Manithargal =

2018 Indian Tamil-language film

- Directed by: Vaigarai Balan
- Written by: Vaigarai Balan
- Produced by: Pradeep Jose
- Starring: Kishore; Latha Rao
- Edited by: Uma Shankar
- Music by: Sam C. S.
- Production company: Christ P The International Productions
- Release date: 3 August 2018
- Running time: 115 minutes
- Country: India
- Language: Tamil

Kadikara Manithargal (transl. Clock People) is a 2018 Indian Tamil language drama thriller film written and directed by Vaigarai Balan on his directorial debut and produced by Pradeep Jose. The film stars Kishore and Latha Rao in the lead roles while Karunakaran, Bala Singh, and Vasu Vikram play pivotal roles in the film. The music for the film is scored by Sam C. S. The film was released on 3 August 2018 after a long production delay lasted for 2 years and received mixed reviews from the audience upon release.

== Plot ==
The story revolves around Maran (Kishore), who works in a bakery. He and his wife (Latha Rao) are searching for a house to rent. A shady broker Arumugam (Scissor Manohar) gets Maran a house under his budget, but he has to face the sanctions of the house owner Rangasamy (Bala Singh) if he wants to stay in the house. Rangasamy will only allow a family of four, but Maran has three children, making it five members in his family, including him and his wife. Maran has no other option, so he lies to Rangasamy and hides one of his kids in the box which he uses to load his bakery goods.

== Cast ==
- Kishore as Maran
- Latha Rao as Maran's wife
- Karunakaran as Shiva
- Bala Singh as Rangasamy
- Vasu Vikram
- Scissor Manohar as Arumugam
- Pradeep Jose as Lease
- Sherin Pillakal
- Sheela Gopi
- Soundar
- Bava Lakshmanan
- Master Rishi as Maran's son
- Master Madhesh as Maran's son
- Baby Varshika as Maran's daughter

== Production ==
The production of the film was commenced in early 2016 by debutant director Vaigarai Balan. The production team also roped in Sam CS as the music director of the film. The trailer of the film was released in the year 2016.

== Release ==
The film was initially scheduled to be released in around late 2017 but delayed before its original release on 3 August 2018, a day where 11 other Tamil films also clashed at the box office. This is also the first instance in Tamil cinema history in which at least 10 films are scheduled to hit the screens on the same day.

== Soundtrack ==
The music for the film is composed by Sam CS and the songs received positive reviews from the audience. The soundtrack of the movie was released on 19 December 2016 and consists of 4 songs. The lyrics were penned by music composer Sam CS, late lyricist expert Na. Muthukumar and Karki Bhava.

Kadikara Manithargal

Soundtrack album by Sam C. S.
- Released: 19 December 2016
- Genre: Feature film soundtrack
- Length: 17:45
- Label: TrendMusic
- Producer: Sam C. S.

Sam C. S. chronology
Mr. Chandramouli (2018)	Kadikara Manithargal (2018)	Lakshmi (2018)

Soundtrack
No.	Title	Music	Singer(s)	Length
1.	"Kadhal Pennea"	Sam CS	Karthik, Haritha Balakrishnan	4:48
2.	"Theera Oru"	Sam CS	Sam CS	3:48
3.	"Pattasu Vedingada"	Sam CS	Anthony Daasan, Mukesh Mohamed, Velmurugan	5:05
4.	"Yeanoo"	Sam CS	Sam CS	4:04
Total length:				17:45
