= Ayal Njanalla =

- Film poster
- Directed by: Vineeth Kumar
- Written by: Vineeth Kumar
- Story by: Ranjith
- Produced by: Sundar Menon
- Starring: Fahadh Faasil; Mrudula Murali; Divya Pillai; Akshat Singh
- Cinematography: Shamdat Sainudeen
- Edited by: Manoj
- Music by: Manu Ramesan
- Production companies: Sun Ads & Film Productions (LLP)
- Distributed by: Sun Ads & Film Productions (LLP)
- Release date: 31 July 2015
- Running time: 149 minutes
- Country: India
- Language: Malayalam

Ayal Njanalla (English: He is not me) is a 2015 Indian Malayalam-language romantic comedy film written and directed by actor Vineeth Kumar (in his directorial debut) based on the story by director Ranjith. The film stars Fahadh Faasil, Mrudula Murali, Divya Pillai and Akshat Singh in prominent roles. The film opened to mixed reviews and average performance at the box office. The film was produced by Sundar Menon, Sun Ads and Film Productions, and was the first production venture from the house.

== Plot ==
This film revolves around a youth named Prakashan, who moved to Gujarat 15 years ago. He works as an assistant to his uncle who runs a decrepit tire shop at Kutch. Having moved to Gujarat years back, he nurtures a dream of marrying Esha and of paying off his uncle's debts. Hoping to sell off his ancestral property in Kerala, Prakashan heads to Bangalore to meet an old school mate Arun, where he is mistaken for the celebrity Fahadh Faasil (played by himself).

== Cast ==
- Fahadh Faasil in a dual role as :
  - Prakashan
  - Himself
- Mrudula Murali as Esha
- Divya Pillai as Heera
- Sijoy Varghese as Manaf
- S. P. Sreekumar as Jomon
- Akshat Singh as Mottu
- Ranji Panicker-Menon
- Tini Tom as Chacko
- Anil Nedumangad as Police Officer
- Nobi as Sabu
- T G Ravi as chandrammama
- Dinesh Prabhakar as Vasco
- Jins Baskar as Arun
- Aileena Catherin Amon as Diya
- Sreekanth Menon as Lakhan
- JK Nair as Dheerubhai
- Babu Annur as Aravindan
