= Uthara Unnikrishnan =

Indian playback singer (born 2004)

- Born: 11 June 2004 (age 22)
- Years active: 2012–present

Uthara Unnikrishnan (born 11th June 2004) is an Indian playback singer, who predominantly works in Tamil films. In 2015, she won India's National Film Award for Best Female Playback Singer at the 62nd National Film Awards for her rendition of the song "Azhagu" from the 2014 Tamil film Saivam, a family drama directed by A. L. Vijay. She received the award at the age of 10, becoming its youngest recipient.

== Early and personal life ==
Uthara Unnikrishnan is the daughter of Carnatic classical singer P. Unni Krishnan and Bharatanatyam dancer Priya Unnikrishnan. Her father, a recipient of multiple National Film Awards for Best Male Playback Singer, received his first award in 1994 for his debut performance of the Tamil songs "Ennavale Adi Ennavale"(for movie Kaadhalan) and "Uyirum Neeye".

Uthara began learning Carnatic music at the age of six from Sudha Raja. She studied in Lady Andal school and APL Global school and now currently studying BSc Psychology in MOP Vaishnav College for Women, Chennai. Apart from Tamil music, she enjoys Western (classical, rock and pop) and wants to master all these genres.

== Career ==
She sang the song "Azhagu" (Beauty) was composed by G. V. Prakash Kumar, based on raga Kanada. The song describes a child's perception of the beauty around her. The song was penned by Na. Muthukumar, who also received the National Film Award for Best Lyrics. When Uthara Unnikrishnan accompanied her mother to Carnatic singer Saindhavi's house during Golu festival, she sang a few lines. A couple of months later, Saindhavi's husband G. V. Prakash Kumar called upon Uthara to croon a solo melody for Saivam. Uthara recorded the song for child actor Sara Arjun when she was eight years old in 2013. Apart from "Azhagu", she has sung two more Tamil songs.

In 2015, she won the National Film Award for Best Female Playback Singer for her rendition of the song "Azhage." Singer Pradip Somasundaran criticised the song as having been modified with pitch correction software. Uthara later worked on Theri with G. V. Prakash Kumar in the song "Eena Meena Teeka".

== Discography ==
Year	Film	Song	Language	Notes
2014	Saivam	"Azhagu"	Tamil	Won—National Film Award for Best Female Playback Singer
2014	Pisaasu	"Pogum Padhai"	Tamil	
2015	Dagudumootha Dandakor	"Evaru Nearparu"	Telugu	
2015	Strawberry	"Kaiveesum"	Tamil	
2016	Theri	"Eena Meena Teeka"	Tamil	
2018	Lakshmi	"Morrakka"	Tamil	Also dubbed for Ditya Bhande
2018	Lakshmi	"Morrakka"	Telugu	Dubbed version
2025	Once More	"Vaa Kannamma"	Tamil	
2025	3BHK	"Kanavellam"	Tamil	
