= Agilan =

2023 Indian Tamil-language film by N Kalyanakrishnan

- Theatrical release poster
- Directed by: N. Kalyanakrishnan
- Written by: N. Kalyanakrishnan
- Produced by: Siddharth Ravipati; Senthil Kumar
- Starring: Ravi Mohan; Priya Bhavani Shankar; Tanya Ravichandran
- Cinematography: Vivekanand Santhosham
- Edited by: N. Ganesh Kumar
- Music by: Sam C. S.
- Production company: Screen Scene Media Entertainment
- Distributed by: Red Giant Movies; Ayngaran International
- Release date: 10 March 2023
- Running time: 131 minutes
- Country: India
- Language: Tamil

Agilan: King of the Indian Ocean is a 2023 Indian Tamil-language action thriller film directed by N. Kalyanakrishnan. The film stars Ravi Mohan in dual roles as a father and son, along with Priya Bhavani Shankar and Tanya Ravichandran in the lead roles. Sam C. S. composed the film's soundtrack while Screen Scene Media Entertainment produced the film.

The film was initially scheduled to be released theatrically on 15 September 2022 although the release date was postponed. It was released on 10 March 2023 and received mixed reviews from critics.

== Plot ==
Agilan is a container crane operator who works at Chennai Port and does criminal activities for a drug smuggler, Paranthaman, who works for a dangerous kingpin, Kapoor. Kapoor deals with smuggling containers of fake and genuine money. After an officer named Sarangan causes a problem with an assignment of smuggling counterfeit money containers, Agilan kills him, and his men dispose of his body inside a body bag. The union leader, Jananathan, becomes enraged at Agilan's activities and threatens to remove him from the union, but Agilan remains unfazed. Paranthaman instructs Agilan to kill three temporary workers whom he had organised to murder the union leader. Agilan and his men try to kill them, but they run to a police station under the control of SI Madhavi.

However, Madhavi also works for Agilan, and Agilan gets the three workers arrested under a non-bailable case. Agilan handles an order from two men to break out a container containing Chinese weapons seized by the authorities and gets the containers. However, Paranthaman's goon, Pasupathy, gets the containers back. Agilan becomes suspicious of the men, and he asks Madhavi to spy on the two men. It turns out that the two men are working for NIA officer Gokul, but Agilan smartly sets a trap for Paranthaman and Gokul. Gokul installs surveillance and a security scanner at the port. Kapoor decides to do illegal human trafficking, and his first assignment is to traffic an Austrian cyberterrorist named George Adams, who holds confidential data on the world's leading people.

They fall silent after Agilan says that if they complete the human trafficking, Kapoor will kill them. Agilan agrees to the task. Agilan's plan to traffic George Adams is to provide oxygen to him so that he does not suffocate. They disguise him in the guise of mannequins. Agilan completes the trafficking of Adams and becomes King of the Indian Ocean. Paranthaman follows Agilan by sea and sees Jananathan talking with Agilan. They allied with the Somalian sailors to sail a charity ship called Tamilannai. Arasu captures Jananathan upon Paranthaman's orders. Agilan searches for Parathaman and his men, but Gokul knocks him out, where Agilan narrates his past.

Past: Agilan is locked up at a young age because someone betrayed his father, and the prison women raised him. The collector organises Tamilannai to feed two million hungry Indian people stranded on a desert island. Agilan's father, Nandhan, is a marine engineer who fixes Tamilannai's engines, but Nandhan discovers bundles of money in a bin and realises that there is illegal cargo on the ship. It turns out that a gangster named Dilli and the ship's captain, Manoj Kumar, work together to smuggle 200 kilos of cocaine. Nandhan's wife, Punitha, tells him to take the vessel to feed the people and kill the crew. Eventually, after the ship sails, Manoj Kumar shoots Nandhan dead. The crew members threw Nandhan's body and all the food for the people overboard, leading the deserted people to die. They arrested Punitha on a false case where she died giving birth to Agilan in prison.

Present: Agilan explains to Gokul that Jananathan taught him how to create and administer Tamilannai and that the African people are the right people to sail Tamilannai. The people find Jananathan hanging dead, and Paranthaman informs them that Agilan killed Jananathan, but Madhavi brings the three workers. The people realise that Paranthaman killed Jananathan and surround Paranthaman as he runs away and swiftly kills him. Nallaperumal and Kapoor work together to stop Tamilannai's sailing. Kapoor hires a deadly group called the Eastern Sea pirates, but Agilan fights them off and beats up Pasupathy. Adams surrenders to Germany, which leads Gokul to arrest Kapoor.

Nallaperumal beats up Gokul and tries to put illegal goods and destroys food in Tamilannai's containers, but Agilan beats his men. Nallaperumal shoots Agilan and kicks him into the sea, where he tells the committee that Tamilannai is a fake charity, but the contraband is not there. Agilan arrives with Madhavi, and it turns out that the African sailors switched the containers. Gokul survives and exposes Nallaperumal's nature. Nallaperumal eventually dies from a swinging ship's rope. The police arrest Agilan, and Tamilannai sails, fulfilling his mother's desire.

== Cast ==
- Ravi Mohan in a dual role as
  - Agilan, a container crane operator at Chennai Port
  - Nandhan, Agilan's father, a marine engineer
- Priya Bhavani Shankar as Inspector Madhavi
- Tanya Ravichandran as Punitha, Agilan's mother and Nandhan's wife
- Madhusudhan Rao as Jananathan, the union leader
- Hareesh Peradi as Paranthaman
- Tarun Arora as Kapoor
- Chirag Jani as Inspector S. Gokul Mehta
- Harish Uthaman as Nallaperumal, a traffic officer
- Mime Gopi as Manoj Kumar, Tamilannai's captain and Nandhan's friend turned enemy
- Sai Dheena as Dilli, a gangster
- Sai Tamil as Pashupathy, Paranthaman's henchmen
- I.S. Rajesh as Arasu, Agilan's friend turned enemy
- Sampath Ram as ship worker
- O. A. K. Sundar as C. Sarangan, an officer

== Production ==
The film was tentatively titled as JR28. Later, the title of the film was announced to be Agilan. Ravi Mohan, will be playing the role of a marine engineer in this film. Priya Bhavani Shankar was chosen as the female leads in this film marking her first collaboration with Ravi Mohan. Other actors and actresses like Tanya Ravichandran, Chirag Jani, and Harish Uthaman etc. where chosen to play pivotal roles in the film. The shooting of the film was wrapped up on 27 May 2022.

== Music ==
Agilan

Soundtrack album by Sam C. S.
- Released: 2023
- Genre: Feature film soundtrack
- Language: Tamil
- Label: Think Music
- Producer: Sam C. S.

Sam C. S. chronology
Thugs (2023)	Agilan (2023)	Kondraal Paavam (2023)

Singles from Agilan
- 1. "Dhrogam" Released: 27 February 2023

The film's music is composed by Sam C. S. which also marks his second collaboration with Ravi Mohan after Adanga Maru. The first single titled "Dhrogam" was released on 27 February 2023.

Track listing
No.	Title	Lyrics	Singer(s)	Length
1.	"Dhrogam"	Vivek	Sam C. S., Shivam	4:02
Total length:				4:02

== Release ==
=== Theatrical ===
The film was released theatrically on 10 March 2023 and overseas were released by Ayngaran International.

=== Home media ===
The streaming and satellite rights of the film were bought by ZEE5 and Kalaignar TV. The film was digitally premiered in ZEE5 on 30 March 2023.

== Reception ==
Agilan received mixed reviews from critics.

Gopinath Rajendran of The Hindu wrote "Watching Agilan is the equivalent of being thrown into the middle of choppy waters — you’re trying to keep yourself conscious but wave after wave of randomness keeps hitting you, tiring you to even hope for some respite." A critic of Maalai Malar gave 3.5 out of 5 stars and wrote "In the first half, the screenplay is lively and interesting, and in the second half, the action is mixed." Logesh Balachandran of The Times of India gave 2.5 out of 5 stars and wrote "Although Agilan has the usual commercial tropes we've seen before, its backdrop makes it slightly more interesting. While the film is watchable, the second half fails to satisfy the audience's expectations." A Dina Thanthi critic wrote "Director Kalyana Krishnan has shown the other side of the treacherous world of sea, ships and selfishness of people in a one-line story about how the life of the grassroots is crushed by the shenanigans behind the maritime trade."
