= Thappu Thanda =

2017 Indian film by Srikantan

- Theatrical release poster
- Directed by: Srikantan
- Written by: Srikantan
- Screenplay by: Srikantan
- Produced by: Sathyamurthi
- Starring: Sathyamurthi; Swetha Gai; Mime Gopi; John Vijay
- Cinematography: A. Vinod Bharathi
- Edited by: Raja Sethupathy
- Music by: Naren Balakumar
- Production company: Clap Board Production
- Distributed by: Clap Board Production
- Release date: 8 September 2017
- Running time: 109 minutes
- Country: India
- Language: Tamil

Thappu Thanda (transl. Wrong Deed) is a 2017 Tamil-language comedy thriller film written and directed by debutant Srikantan and produced by SathyaMurthi for Clapboard Production. The film features Sathyamurthi and Shwetha Gai in the lead roles, while Mime Gopi, John Vijay, Aathma Patrick and Ajay Ghosh appear in prominent roles. The story revolves around a politician who transfers a huge amount of money to bribe public for votes and a group of small time robbers who plan to loot that money. The film was released across Tamil Nadu on 8 September 2017.

== Cast ==
- Sathyamurthi as Vetri
- Shweta Gai as Abi
- Mime Gopi as Karna
- Ajay Ghosh as Miller
- John Vijay as Guru
- E. Ramdoss as Thiyagu
- Aathma Patrick as Kaliya
- Krishna Kaanth as Bothx
- Sendrayan as thief intern
- Jeeva Ravi
- K. S. G. Venkatesh
- Mippu

== Production ==
The film's director Srikantan was a graduate of Balu Mahendra's film institute "Cinema Pattarai". The film took a year to script and was then shot entirely across Chennai. A further romantic song was shot in the hills of Wagoman, Kerala. The shoot finished with the song "Dooplika Domaari", which featured 40 stunt artists. The film's producer V.SathyaMurthi was cast as the film's lead actor, while an ensemble cast of supporting actors including John Vijay, Mime Gopi and Ajay Ghosh of Visaranai (2016), were also included in the project. Actress Swetha Gai, who had previously appeared in small roles in A. L. Vijay's Idhu Enna Maayam (2015) and Anirudh Ravichander's "Avalukkena" video, was cast in the leading female role. Prior to the release of the film, Srikantan compared Thappu Thanda to the Kamal Haasan-starrer Mumbai Xpress (2005) and Nalan Kumarasamy's Soodhu Kavvum (2013) stating you find the characters are doing something serious on screen but their actions make audiences laugh.

== Music ==
Thappu Thanda

Soundtrack album by Naren Balakumar
- Released: 2017
- Recorded: 15 April 2017
- Length: 23:18
- Language: Tamil
- Label: TrendMusic
- Producer: Naren Balakumar

Naren Balakumar chronology
Thappu Thanda (2017)	Utharavu Maharaja (2018)

The film's music was composed by Naren Balakumar and the album released on 15 April 2017, featuring five songs and a theme track.

Track list
No.	Title	Lyrics	Singer(s)	Length
1.	"Thiruttu Pasanga"	Naren Balakumaran, Hyde Karty	Hariharasudhan, Hyde Karty, Naren Balakumar	2:46
2.	"Mughaye Ven Mughaye"	Uma Devi	Abhay Jodhpurkar, Chinmayi	5:26
3.	"Duplica Domari"	Mani Amuthavan	Gana Vinoth	4:04
4.	"Mughaye Ven Mughaye (Reprise)"	Uma Devi	Chinmayi	4:18
5.	"Thadak Thadak"	Uma Devi	Alphons Joseph	4:15
6.	"Theme of Hunter"	—	—	2:29
Total length:				23:18

== Release ==
The film was released on 8 September 2017, earning positive reviews. A critic from The Times of India wrote "Thappu Thanda is solidly-made for a debut film, and Srikantan narrates his story with confidence" but "what the film lacks is chutzpah in the filmmaking to dazzle us". Likewise, a critic from The New Indian Express wrote "a thrilling second half saves a dour first" adding "lovely attention to intricate details in the latter half left me wondering if the film’s two halves were made by two different people".
