= Enemy (2021 film) =

2021 Indian film by Anand Shankar

- Theatrical release poster
- Directed by: Anand Shankar
- Screenplay by: Anand Shankar; S. Ramakrishnan; Shan Karuppuswamy
- Dialogues by: Shan Karuppuswamy
- Story by: Anand Shankar
- Produced by: S. Vinod Kumar
- Starring: Vishal; Arya; Mirnalini Ravi; Mamta Mohandas; Prakash Raj; Thambi Ramaiah
- Cinematography: R. D. Rajasekhar
- Edited by: Raymond Derrick Crasta
- Music by: Songs: S. Thaman; Sam C. S. Score: Sam C. S.
- Production company: Mini Studios
- Distributed by: Ayngaran International
- Release date: 4 November 2021
- Running time: 157 minutes
- Country: India
- Language: Tamil

Enemy is a 2021 Indian Tamil-language action thriller film co-written and directed by Anand Shankar and produced by Vinod Kumar under the banner of Mini Studios. The film features Vishal and Arya in the lead roles, while Mirnalini Ravi, Mamta Mohandas, Prakash Raj, Thambi Ramaiah and Karunakaran play supporting roles. The film marks Vishal and Arya's second collaboration after Avan Ivan (2011).

Enemy was released on 4 November 2021 to mixed reviews from critics, but became an average venture at the box office.

== Plot ==
1996: In Ooty, 13-year-old Chozhan Ramalingam and Rajiv Parirajan are childhood friends whom Parirajan, Rajiv's father, trains to enable them to join the police force. Although given equal training, Chozhan bests Rajiv, much to the latter's jealousy. One day, Chozhan and Rajiv are playing chess, and Rajiv wins. While Rajiv leaves Chozhan pondering over the outcome, he sees Parirajan dead on the floor. The police escort the boys to the police station, and Chozhan tells the inspector and Ramalingam, Chozhan's risk-averse father, that he can catch the killer using his skills. Ramalingam takes Chozhan away, leaving Rajiv alone, and makes his son promise to stop taking risks.

2021: Chozhan works at a departmental store run by Ramalingam in Singapore. Unbeknownst to his father, he is a part-time vigilante who thwarts minor crimes and corruption to help the Tamil community. One day, a gas company near his store suddenly bursts, which kills 11 people and severely injures five more. Chozhan catches Joseph, the painter behind the mess, and hands him over to the police. The next day, Arundathi Mohan, the Indian External Affairs minister, comes to Singapore to address the Tamil people but struggles to speak at the gathering. Chozhan senses that her pacemaker has been tampered with and shoots her in the chest to disable it. The police arrest Chozhan, but release him after they realize his intentions.

Chozhan tips off the police to the culprit at a hotel, who turns out to be Rajiv, now a hardened assassin whom a corrupt Beijing businessman hired to kill the minister. However, Rajiv escapes after threatening to kill the police officers' families. Chozhan meets up with Rajiv, who reveals what happened on the day they separated: Parirajan confronted and scolded Rajiv for misusing his skills to loot some money, which made Rajiv kill his father. He also overheard his father saying that Chozhan would eventually overshadow Rajiv in anything, thus inciting in him a deep hatred towards Chozhan.

Rajiv claims that he has evolved in multiple ways and is way too advanced for Chozhan to intercept while challenging him to rescue one of his kidnapped loved ones. Chozhan calls everyone for a surprise engagement party with his love interest, Ashvitha, to protect them. However, Chozhan soon realised that his cousin's daughter, Pinky, had gone missing from her school trip. Rajiv contacts him and informs him that he kidnapped Pinky from her school to kill her. Chozhan responds by abducting Rajiv's pregnant wife and partner, Anisha, whom Rajiv rescued from her unsavory uncle not long after killing his father. Chozhan threatens to kill Anisha if anything happens to Pinky.

At a meeting to exchange their kin, Rajiv releases Pinky but Chozhan knows he won't let his enmity go so easily. He makes a deal with Rajiv: Chozhan will safely send Anisha back to India if Rajiv surrenders to the police for the deaths of the 11 people from the gas explosion earlier. Rajiv reluctantly agrees. As Chozhan takes Anisha to the airport, the hitman sent by the Beijing businessman to kill Rajiv after he failed his assignment learns about her connection to him. The hitman follows Anisha and slits her throat in the washroom. In prison, Rajiv finds out about Anisha's death on TV and is anguished, thinking Chozhan broke their deal. He escapes by swallowing prawns, triggering an allergic reaction.

Rajiv plots against Chozhan by kidnapping the children of his area and tells the community that to save their children, Ramalingam must die. He attempts to brainwash someone into shooting Ramalingam to no avail. Rajiv then extorts Ramalingam alone to commit suicide by drinking rat poison after revealing that he killed his father, and Ramalingam taking his son away was why Parirajan's case remained unsolved. In the meantime, Chozhan saves the children and returns with them. Ramalingam dies in his son's arms after encouraging Chozhan to finish Rajiv.

Chozhan confronts Rajiv inside a skyscraper, and after an intense fight, he kicks Rajiv off the building and grabs him by his leg. Chozhan divulges the Beijing corporates' involvement in Anisha's death. Rajiv is shocked upon realizing he misjudged the situation and begs Chozhan to pull him up, but Chozhan drops him off the building to his death.

Several years later, Chozhan goes with his son to lay flowers on Ramalingam's and Rajiv's graves. When his son asks why Chozhan lays flowers on Rajiv's grave even though he was a bad man, Chozhan says it's to remind himself of how he became who he is today.

== Cast ==
- Vishal as Chozhan Ramalingam
  - Raghavan as Young Chozhan
- Arya as Rajiv Parirajan, Chozhan's former childhood friend
  - Riyan Shah as Young Rajiv
- Mirnalini Ravi as Ashvitha, Chozhan's fiancée, later wife (Voice dubbed by Raveena Ravi)
- Mamta Mohandas as Anisha, Rajiv's wife (Voice dubbed by Smruthi K)
  - Raveena Daha as Young Anisha
- Prakash Raj as IG Parirajan IPS, Rajiv's father
- Thambi Ramaiah as "Risk" Ramalingam, Chozhan's father
- Karunakaran as Babu, Chozhan's friend
- John Vijay as Peter, Anisha’s uncle
- George Maryan as Ganesan, Ramalingam's friend
- G. Marimuthu as Police Officer Eashwara Moorthy
- Malavika Avinash as Arundathi Mohan, Minister of External Affairs
- R. N. R. Manohar as Inspector Govindaraj
- Gandhi Mahendran as Ramalingam's friend
- Manasvi Kottachi as Pinky
- Kottachi as Jegan
- Jayakumar as Arjun
- Pradeep K Vijayan as Hacker
- TSR Srinivasan as Constable Kandhavelu
- Saranya Ravikumar as Ashvitha's colleague and close friend
- Arivu (Guest role in "Little India" song)

== Production ==
After appearing together in Avan Ivan, Arya and Vishal worked together again for this movie. The principal photography of the film began in November 2020 and the shoot wrapped up on 12 July 2021.

== Music ==
Enemy

Soundtrack album by S. Thaman and Sam C. S.
- Released: 25 October 2021
- Recorded: 2020
- Genre: Feature film soundtrack
- Length: 16:47
- Language: Tamil
- Label: Divo
- Producers: S. Thaman; Sam C. S.

S. Thaman chronology
Varudu Kaavalenu (2021)	Enemy (2021)	Akhanda (2021)

Sam C. S. chronology
Kasada Thapara (2021)	Enemy (2021)	Sabhaapathy (2021)

Singles from Enemy
- 1. "Pathala" Released: 20 August 2021; 2. "Tum Tum" Released: 3 September 2021; 3. "Little India" Released: 20 September 2021

The songs were composed by S. Thaman and Sam C. S. while the latter did the film score. This marks Thaman's third collaboration with Vishal after Pattathu Yaanai and Ayogya, as well as with Arya after Settai and Meaghamann, plus Sam's second collaboration with both Vishal and Thaman after the aforementioned Ayogya. The song "Tum Tum" attained popularity as a South Indian wedding standard, even among those residing in other countries.

No.	Title	Lyrics	Music	Singer(s)	Length
1.	"Pathala"	Arivu	S. Thaman	Deepak Blue	4:16
2.	"Tum Tum"	Vivek	S. Thaman	Sri Vardhini, Aditi, Satya Yamini, Roshini and Tejaswini	3:48
3.	"Little India"	Arivu	S. Thaman	Sarath Santosh and Arivu	4:19
4.	"Orey Naan Orey Nee"	Arivu	Sam C. S	Govind Prasad	2:36
5.	"Run & Die"	Lavita Lobo	Sam C. S.	Lavita Lobo	1:46
Total length:					16:47

== Release ==
The film was initially scheduled to be theatrically released on 14 October 2021, but then pushed to 4 November 2021 coinciding with Diwali festival clashing with Annaatthe. The streaming rights were sold to SonyLIV and the film began streaming there from 18 February 2022.

== Reception ==
=== Critical reception ===
Logesh Balachandran of The Times of India gave 3/5 stars and wrote "Enemy could have been better if some of the cliched sequences had been avoided."

Thinkal Menon of OTTplay gave 2.5/5 stars and wrote "Despite an intriguing premise and a few impressive action scenes, Enemy couldn't cash in on the myriad of opportunities it had." Ashameera Aiyappan of Firstpost gave 2/5 stars and wrote "For a film that is mounted on a rivalry, the equation between Chozhan and Rajiv is pretty shallow and one-dimensional."

Praveen Sudevan of The Hindu wrote "Anand Shankar’s film, after an elaborate and promising start, fizzles out after its leading men are introduced." Ranjani Krishnakumar of Film Companion wrote "Enemy is like Vishal’s dance — full-bodied, hard-working, energetic, confident, but entirely devoid of knack. That doesn’t make it unwatchable though."
