= TrendMusic =

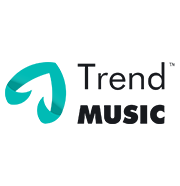
- Parent company: Vision Time India Private Limited
- Founded: 2015; 10 years ago
- Genre: Music
- Country of origin: India
- Official website: trendloud.com

Trend Music is a music label owned by Vision Time India Private Limited. It is known for southern Indian music. The company began operation in 2015.

== Film soundtracks released under the Trend Music Label ==
- Zhagaram (2019)
- Solo(2017)
- Sei (2017)
- Natpuna Ennanu Theriyuma (2017)
- Meesaya Murukku (2017)
- Nan Yar Endru Nee Soll(2017)
- Aarambame Attakasam (2017)
- Kadamban (2017)
- Dharmadurai (2016)
- Oru Melliya Kodu (2016)
- Thittivasal (2016)
- Aakkam (2016)
- Kadalai (2016)
- Mo (2016)
- Vizhithiru (2016)
- Kaadhal Kann Kattudhe (2016)
- Ammani (2016)
- Prabha (2016)
- Andaman (2016)
- Kadikara Manithargal (2016)
- Aangila Padam (2016)
- Virumaandikum Sivanaandikum (2016)
- Thiraikku Varaadha Kadhai (2016)
- Kallattam (2016)
- Kaagitha Kappal (2016)
- Meera Jaakirathai (2016)
- Ka Ka Po (2016)
- Sawaari (2016)
- Nayyapudai (2016)
- Sowkarpettai (2016)
- Karaiyoram (2016)
- Tharkappu (2016)
- Tea Kadai Raja (2016)
- Strawberry (2015)
- Chandi Veeran (2015)
- Vanna Jigina (2015)
