= NOTA (film) =

2018 Indian film by Anand Shankar

- Theatrical release poster
- Directed by: Anand Shankar
- Written by: Shan Karuppusamy
- Story by: Vettaattam by Shan Karuppusamy
- Produced by: K. E. Gnanavel Raja
- Starring: Vijay Devarakonda; Mehreen Pirzada
- Cinematography: Santhana Krishnan Ravichandran
- Edited by: Raymond Derrick Crasta
- Music by: Sam C. S.
- Production company: Studio Green
- Distributed by: Freeze Frame Films (Overseas)
- Release date: 5 October 2018
- Running time: 153 minutes
- Country: India
- Language: Tamil
- Box office: est. ₹25.50 crore

NOTA (transl. None of the above) is a 2018 Indian Tamil-language political action thriller film directed by Anand Shankar. It stars Vijay Deverakonda, making his Tamil debut and the only Tamil film he has acted in to date, playing the lead role along with Mehreen Pirzada. Sathyaraj, Nassar, Sanchana Natarajan, Karunakaran, Priyadarshi Pulikonda, Yashika Aannand, M. S. Bhaskar, and Rajendran, among others portray supporting roles. Produced by K. E. Gnanavel Raja, under his production house Studio Green, the film was adapted from the novel Vettattam by Shan Karuppusamy who is also involved in the film's screenplay.

The film revolves around Varun, the son of a chief minister, who rises to his father's position after corruption charges are brought against him. Varun, who has no political experience, soon finds himself stuck to the chair for a longer time.

The musical score and soundtrack were composed by Sam C. S. and the cinematography and editing were handled by Santhana Krishnan Ravichandran and Raymond Derrick Crasta. The film premiered on 5 October 2018 in India and on 4 October 2018 in the United States. The film opened to mixed-to-positive reviews from critics, but eventually it was a box-office failure.

== Plot ==
Varun Subramanyam (Vijay Deverakonda) is a video game designer living in the UK. He is the son of Vinodhan Subramanyam, the long-time Chief Minister of Tamil Nadu. Varun visits Chennai for his birthday to visit the orphanage he runs and see his little half-sister Narmada (Amrutha). Varum later goes out partying arrives home to shocking news that he is to be sworn in as the new Chief Minister as Vinodhan (Nassar) is to be found guilty in a corruption case. Despite his reservations, Varun is sworn in as Chief Minister.

As Chief Minister Varun does nothing save play video games and sign documents provided by the Chief Secretary. When Vinodhan is arrested and sent to prison riots break out in the city. A schoolgirl dies in a bus fire during the riots and Varun goes to the site of the tragedy, asking his guru Mahendran (Sathyaraj), to meet him there.

Varun then realizes the importance of his position and stops the riots, threatening the rioters at a press meeting. This is not liked by the opposition party led by Varadarajan (K.S.G.Venkatesh). Varun then gains the name "Rowdy CM" given by the opposition party after being mocked as "Dummy CM".

On the other side, Vinodhan thinks the reason why he passed on the post to his son reason was due to the advice of a swamiji Satyananda (Tej Sapru) who predicted that there is a threat to Vinodhan's position and that he has to resign, while the position has to be taken up by someone of his own bloodline. Vinodhan doubts if Varun is his own son because years ago, Varun's mother (Abhirami Venkatachalam) realized that Vinodhan was a famous actor at that time and was cheating on her with other co-actresses. During a heated argument, she tells him that she might also be cheating on him, which angers him, and he almost chokes her to death. The next day she is found dead, having taken 23 sleeping pills. Thus, Vinodhan never got the answer if Varun was ever his son. Meanwhile, Vinodhan is attacked in a bomb blast by some anonymous men and gets admitted in the hospital, which leads him into a coma. Now, since Varun has to take the responsibility as the CM, he goes through his father's things, in which he finds a diary with codes and bank accounts. He, along with his friend Wong, investigates about it. Due to sudden heavy rain, a dam was required to be opened without prior notice opening. It turned out that the officials were waiting for the CM's order. Varun mocks them by telling them to wait until Vinodhan is released from jail, but he later acts immediately, creating awareness and asking the youths to help; thus, when the dam was opened, it only destroyed properties but not lives. Also, Mahendran talks to Varun and his daughter Swathi (Mehreen Pirzada) about his first love, which was broken due to his friend's selfishness. When Varun stands for the post as CM, a video of him which was taken earlier that had him kissing a foreigner named Sylvia (Brooklyn) in a nightclub party is released, but in reality, he was drugged by the opposition party. Varun cleverly clears his name with the help of director A. R. Murugadoss. Also, the foreigner tells him that she is an actress who joined Varun to do a short film.

Varun sends Wong (Priyadarshi Pulikonda) to Panama to hack the account of the fake owners of the property and transfer the money to his account. Vinodhan, hearing his daughter Narmada talking to his second-wife about Varun winning the temporary election and the clean sweep of the bank accounts, wakes up from his coma and asks for Varun. Thus, when he visits, Vinodhan acts in a way to gain his son's pity. Believing this, he tells it to Mahendran, to which he replies that his father was an actor and there is trouble yet to come.

Meanwhile, a chain of events begin to happen: Swathi meets with an accident; Wong ends up being caught in Panama but somehow escapes; and the foreigner commits suicide and blames it on Varun, who is searched by the police to be arrested, but Varun, with the help of Varadarajan's daughter Kayal (Sanchana Natarajan), stays in her house, where treatment is given to Swathi. Now, the cunning Vinodhan announces one of his goons as the CM instead of Bhai a very well-experienced friend of his. Vinodhan and his friend then have a heated argument. Varun, who has hacked the CCTV footage of the hospital, calls and tells his father's friend to tell the followers to vote for him because he has all the money of his party's followers. It is also shown that Satyananda brainwashed Vinodhan for a $20,000,000 deal.

Varun wins the trust vote 122 to 110 (in absentia) and retains his job as CM, and Mahendran tells him that he loved Vinodhan's wife Chitra, before they got married, but Vinodhan broke their relationship to marry Mahendran's lover for her wealth. Mahendran admits that he did not meet her after that. He also said that Varun was Vinodhan's own son and not any other's. Vinodhan realizes his mistake and asks Varun to forgive him. Varun then continues his duty as the CM and decides to bring many changes in the State and also win the next election by people's true votes rather than bribing them .

== Cast ==
- Vijay Deverakonda as Varun Subramaniam
- Mehreen Pirzada as Swati Mahendran
- Sathyaraj as Mahendran
- Nassar as Vinodhan Subramaniam
- M. S. Bhaskar as Bhai
- Karunakaran as Rocky
- Priyadarshi Pullikonda as Varadarajan Gangadar alias Wong
- Rajendran as Ramaswamy
- Sanchana Natarajan as Kalaavathi Varadharajan (Kayal)
- Yashika Aannand as Shilpa
- Abhirami Venkatachalam as Chitra Vinodhan
- K. S. G. Venkatesh as Varadharajan
- Tej Sapru as Swamiji Satyananda
- Brooklyn as Silvia
- Amrutha as Narmadha
- Jayalakshmi as Kausalya
- Rangammal
- A. R. Murugadoss as himself (cameo appearance)

== Production ==
Principal photography of the film was officially launched on 9 March 2018, but the shoot was cancelled due to the standoff between Nadigar Sangam and Digital Service Providers on the increase of Virtual Print Fee charges. The shooting was resumed after the strike called off. Vijay Deverakonda nailed an immense Tamil dialogue scene in one single take, which impressed the crew members. He shared a picture from the film's shoot through the social media. It was revealed that he is playing a role of the powerful politician in the film. And it is also known that director A. R. Murugadoss, is playing a cameo role in this film. Filming completed in August 2018.

== Themes and influences ==
While the film is based on a novel Vettattam, written by Shan Karuppaswamy, the film also features scenes which parodies the current political happenings in Chennai, which includes the 2015 South Indian floods, hospitalization of Chief Minister and MLA's in resort etc.

== Soundtrack ==
The musical score and soundtrack were composed by Sam. C. S. The audio rights of the film were secured by Lahari Music and T-Series. Vijay Deverakonda released the "Shot Number" song on 20 September 2018. The full album was released in both Tamil and Telugu versions on 4 October 2018.

For the theme song "The Rise Of A Leader" composer Sam worked with the Macedonian Symphony Orchestra with 150 live musicians, were a part of the film's background score, especially for this song.

The background score of the film was appreciated whereas the songs were criticised. Writing for The Times of India, Thinkal Menon reviewed the song "Yethikka Yethikka" as an "energetic party song which celebrates the spirit of youth" and "Raja Raja Kula" as "an average one", while "Hey Amaicha" is stated as "neither exceptional nor a tiresome one and "Yaar Kalikku as "a poignant track" - calling the album an above average fare.

NOTA

Soundtrack album by Sam C. S.
- Released: 20 September 2018 (Single); 4 October 2018 (Album)
- Recorded: 2018
- Genre: Feature film soundtrack
- Length: 16:38
- Languages: Tamil; Telugu
- Labels: Lahari Music; T-Series
- Producer: Sam C. S.

Sam C. S. chronology
Vanjagar Ulagam (2018)	NOTA (2018)	Adanga Maru (2018)

=== Tamil ===
All lyrics are written by Madhan Karky, except where noted.

No.	Title	Singer(s)	Length
1.	"Yethikka Yethikka"	Benny Dayal, Sunitha Sarathy	3:55
2.	"Raja Raja Kula"	Anirudh Ravichander, Swagatha S. Krishnan	3:46
3.	"The Rise Of A Leader" (Performed by the Macedonian Symphony Orchestra)	Instrumental	2:47
4.	"Power Play" (Performed by the Macedonian Symphony Orchestra)	Instrumental	3:30
5.	"Hey Amaicha"	Arvind Srinivas	1:02
6.	"Yaar Kalikku" (Lyrics written by Sam C. S.)	Sam C. S.	1:38
Total length:			16:38

=== Telugu ===
No.	Title	Lyrics	Singer(s)	Length
1.	"Yeththara Yeththara"	Sri Mani	Yazin Nizar & Swagatha S. Krishnan	3:55
2.	"Raja Raja Kula"	Srimani	Abhay Jodhpurkar, Nithyasree Mahadevan	3:46
3.	"The Rise Of A Leader" (Performed by the Macedonian Symphony Orchestra)		Instrumental	2:47
4.	"Power Play" (Performed by the Macedonian Symphony Orchestra)		Instrumental	3:30
5.	"Hey Minister"	Rajesh A. Moorthy	Arvind Srinivas	1:03
6.	"Yevari Papam"	Rajesh A. Moorthy	Sarath Santosh	1:37
Total length:				16:38

== Release ==
It was earlier announced that, the film will be released on 4 October 2018. Later, speculations were clarified that the film releases on 18 October 2018, due to the delay in post-production works, clashing with Vada Chennai, Sandakozhi 2 and Telugu film Hello Guru Preme Kosame. However, the post-production works were completed earlier and the film was released on 5 October 2018.

The distribution rights of the Tamil version were bought by Abinesh Elangovan under the banner Abi & Abi Pictures. The US distribution rights were acquired by Freeze Frame Films and the film was released on 4 October 2018, a day before original release.

== Home media ==
The Telugu dubbed version of the film was made available to stream on 4 November 2018 on Prime Video. The Tamil version was released on the same platform on 27 February 2019. The satellite rights of the film in Tamil version were sold to Zee Tamil and Zee Thirai. While the Telugu version were sold to Star Maa.

== Marketing ==
The first look poster was released on 8 March 2018, with Deverakonda showing an inked middle finger. A sneak peek was released on 2 September 2018 and the following day, the theatrical trailer was unveiled. The makers promoted the film via mock campaigns and mock public meetings, in Vijayawada on 30 September and in Hyderabad on 1 October. A pre-release event was held.

In 2018, Vijay Deverakonda collaborated with the YouTuber and social media influencer Rajmohan Arumugam for a quirky sneakpeak promotional video ahead theatrical release of NOTA which was unveiled in Rajmohan's Put Chutney YouTube channel, where Devarakonda was seen narrating political phrases.

== Reception ==
=== Critical response ===
The film received mixed reviews from critics and audience.

- The Times of India rated 3 out of 5, stars stating "The political scenes are the film's strengths; in fact, its only strengths, while the emotional drama between the characters is quite weak."
- Firstpost gave the film 3/5, stating "The film belongs to Vijay Devarakonda who has given a riveting performance. He is there in almost all frames and along with Nasser and Sathyaraj, the young superstar holds the film together. NOTA, by and large, is enjoyable, racy and relevant to its time."
- India Today, gave the film 2.5 out of 5 stars stating NOTA could have been a great political thriller if the director had done away with cinematic clichés. Vijay Deverakonda is the only saving grace in director Anand Shankar's NOTA, which has many unfeasible ideas."
- Sify rated the film 3 out of 5, stating "NOTA is thrilling and gripping. Its a film that we recommend for the superb acting, and for the exciting dramatic highs. Watch it to understand why Anand Shankar is one of the most exciting voices in Tamil cinema today."
- Baradwaj Rangan of Film Companion reviewed it as "The film is now merely a watchable one, kept afloat by scenes like the one where the city's youths become government officials. It gives you hope. It's only a movie. It's a band-aid on a gushing artery. But it gives you hope."
- Hindustan Times rated the film 2.5 out of 5, stating that "Vijay Devarakonda's political drama works purely as the scenes rely more on reminding audiences of real life situations than showing them splendid performances."
- The Indian Express rated the film 2 out of 5, stating that "Vijay Deverakonda plays his role with a swag. And Nassar stands out with his performance as a corrupt politician with a grotesque nose. Mehreen Pirzada is nearly non-existent. Anand should be appreciated for not including a dreamy song just so she will get something to do in the film. Sanchana Natarajan and Sathyaraj play their given roles without any rewarding moment to shine. NOTA is a better political drama than Bharat Ane Nenu. But, is that enough?"

=== Box office ===
The film has reportedly collected ₹11.10 crore Andhra Pradesh and Telangana, ₹4.50 crore in Tamil Nadu, ₹5.15 crore in Karnataka, ₹1.70 crore in other parts of India and ₹2.45 crore in the US in the opening weekend. It has reportedly collected ₹25.50 crore gross at the worldwide box office on the first weekend and earned ₹11.50 crore for its distributors. The film was a disaster at the box office.

Regarding the criticisms on the film, Vijay Devarakonda wrote on Twitter reading "I will not make excuses, I take responsibility, I am proud of NOTA. It's a story I wanted to tell, a character explored and a performance delivered." The film was a failure at the box office.
