= Clap Board Production =

Tamil film production and distribution house

Clap Board movies is a Tamil film production and distribution house. Clap Board movies is located in Vadapalani, Chennai. It has produced over two films in Tamil and distributed over three films. V. Sathyan is the director of Clap Board movies.

== Filmography ==
=== Production ===
Year	Title	Language	Notes
2017	Thappu Thanda	Tamil	
Upcoming	Odavum Mudiyathu Oliyavum Mudiyathu	Tamil	From YouTube team Eruma Saani
Upcoming	Production No: 3	Tamil	Directed by YouTube fame Shah Ra

=== Distribution ===
Year	Title	Language	Notes
2017	Thappu Thanda	Tamil	
2017	Nenjil Thunivirundhal	Tamil	
2018	Oru Nalla Naal Paathu Solren	Tamil	
2018	Goli Soda 2	Tamil	
2018	Echcharikkai	Tamil	
2018	Adanga Maru	Tamil	
2019	Sindhubaadh	Tamil	
2019	Maamanithan	Tamil	
2019	Miga Miga Avasaram	Tamil	
2020	Odavum Mudiyathu Oliyavum Mudiyathu	Tamil	
