= Akshat Singh =

Indian dancer (born 2005)

- Born: 21 April 2005 (age 21); Patel Nagar, Delhi, India
- Occupations: Dancer; Actor
- Known for: Dance India Dance; India's Got Talent; Jhalak Dikhhla Jaa; Little Big Shots; Britain's Got Talent

Akshat Anjaria or Hakka (born 21 April 2005) is an Indian dancer who came into prominence by showcasing his talent in the Bengali dance reality show Dance Bangla Dance. He then took part in India's reality show India's Got Talent and became an overnight sensation. Singh was also a contestant of Jhalak Dikhhla Jaa (season 7). He debuted as an actor in the Malayalam film Ayal Njanalla and he also is in a Tamil language film Lakshmi.

== Personal life ==
Singh lives in Mumbai and studies in 12th grade in Ryan International School Kandivali. Singh admitted to one of his interviews that he is an ardent fan of actor Salman Khan.

== Career ==
Akshat's first work was in 2011 on the Bengali channel Zee Bangla, where he performed in Dance Bangla Dance. In 2014, he made his appearance on the American talk show The Ellen DeGeneres Show, before later participating on India's Got Talent. His dancing style proved popular, with a video of his performance on YouTube⠀⠀ that had five hundred thousand (5 lakh) views. Singh's popularity soon landed him a role performing for a Japanese television commercial advertisement of Pari Pari Curry. On 27 August 2017, he appeared on the Australian version of the variety show Little Big Shots, with the video highlight of this appearance achieving just under 35 million views on YouTube. In 2019, he auditioned for Britain's Got Talent and danced his way to winning a golden buzzer, though he failed to reach the final.

== Filmography ==
Year	Film	Role	Language	Notes
2015	Ayal Njanalla	Mottu	Malayalam	
2018	Lakshmi	Arnold	Tamil	

=== Television ===
Year	Title	Role	Platform	Language	Ref.
2011	Dance Bangla Dance	Contestant	Zee Bangla	Bengali	
2023	Five Six Seven Eight	Semba's friend	ZEE5	Tamil	
2024	Mismatched	Aalif	Netflix	Hindi	
2025	The Family Man	Vasant	Amazon Prime Video	Hindi	
