= Sabhaapathy =

2021 film by R. Srinivasa Rao

- Official film poster
- Directed by: R. Srinivasa Rao
- Written by: R. Srinivasa Rao
- Produced by: C. Ramesh Kumar
- Starring: Santhanam; Preeti Verma
- Cinematography: Baskar Arumugam
- Edited by: Leo John Paul
- Music by: Sam C. S
- Production company: R K Entertainment
- Release date: 19 November 2021
- Running time: 123 minutes
- Country: India
- Language: Tamil

Sabhaapathy is a 2021 Indian Tamil-language comedy film directed by debutant R. Srinivasa Rao and produced by R K Entertainment. The film stars Santhanam and Preeti Verma in the lead roles and the music is composed by Sam C. S. The film released theatrically on 19 November 2021 to moderate reviews from critics but ended up as a failure in the box office. The satellite and streaming rights were sold to Colors Tamil and Amazon Prime Video and Aha respectively.

== Cast ==
- Santhanam as Sabapathy
- Preeti Verma as Savithri (Saavi)
- M. S. Bhaskar as Ganapathy, Sabapathy's father
- Sayaji Shinde as Lucky Raja
- Vamsi Krishna as Selvam
- Mayilsamy as Astrologer
- Uma as Leelavathi, Sabapathy's mother
- Swaminathan as Rajamani
- Prema Priya as Rajamani's wife
- Lollu Sabha Maaran as Thief
- Pugazh as Ramani
- Vaishnavi Arulmozhi as Manju, Sabapathy's Sister
- Rama as Savithri's mother
- Madurai Muthu as Savithri's brother-in-law
- Master Advaith as Young Sabapathy
- K. Bujji Babu as Gopal, vegetable cart

== Soundtrack ==
Sabhaapathy

Soundtrack album by Sam C. S.
- Released: 2021
- Genre: Feature film soundtrack
- Length: 8:58
- Language: Tamil
- Label: Think Music

Sam C. S. chronology
Enemy (2021)	Sabhaapathy (2021)	Raajavamsam (2021)

The soundtrack and score was composed by Sam C. S.

Track listing
No.	Title	Lyrics	Singer(s)	Length
1.	"Penne Penne"	Sam C. S.	Pradeep Kumar	03:07
2.	"Mayakkathe Maya Kanna"	Vivek	Srinisha Jayaseelan	04:02
Total length:				07:09

== Reception ==
Professional ratings
Review scores
Source	Rating
The Times of India	2.5/5 stars
Sify	2/5 stars

Siby Jeyya of India Herald wrote, "Sabhaapathy is one of Santhanam's better films as a leading man." Sudhir Srinivasan of The New Indian Express wrote, "Sabhaapathy, begins with the deep voice of a narrator who identifies himself as ‘vidhi’, claiming to ‘play’ with ‘innocent’ people like Sabhaapathy. I imagine that on the day I watched Sabhaapathy, Mr Vidhi had chosen me for his game." Suganth of The Times of India gave a rating of 2.5 out on 5 and wrote, "Sabhaapathy is a middling affair. Like a dream that eludes you once you wake up, you forget it the moment you step out of the theatre." Sify gave a rating of 2 out on 5 and wrote as "sabhaapathy is a below-average comedy entertainer that can be watched for the hilarious comedy combination between Santhanam and the MS Baskar!" and the final verdict as "Tedious". Ranjani krishnakumar of Film Companion wrote, "Sabhaapathy is a test of patience, even if you generally enjoy Santhanam's brand of humour."
