= Raajavamsam =

2021 Tamil film

- Theatrical release poster
- Directed by: K. V. Kathirvelu
- Written by: K. V. Kathirvelu
- Produced by: T D Rajha; D R Sanjay Kumar
- Starring: M. Sasikumar; Nikki Galrani
- Cinematography: Siddharth Ramaswamy
- Edited by: V. J. Sabu Joseph
- Music by: Sam C. S.
- Production company: Chendur Film International
- Release date: 26 November 2021
- Running time: 148 minutes
- Country: India
- Language: Tamil

Raajavamsam (transl. Royal dynasty) is a 2021 Indian Tamil-language romantic action comedy drama film written and directed by debutant K. V. Kathirvelu and produced by Chendur Film International. The film stars M. Sasikumar, Nikki Galrani with a supporting cast including Radha Ravi, Nikitha murali,Yogi Babu, Sathish and Vijayakumar. The film featured music composed by Sam C. S. The film was released in theatres on 26 November 2021 and received negative reviews from critics and it failed at the box office.

== Plot ==
A young man, Kannan employed in a prestigious project in his IT firm, goes to his village to visit his family and meet his future bride. However, none of the marriages that are arranged take place. Father of their neighbouring family is insistent that Kannan should marry both of his daughters and no one else. With these matters in his mind, Kannan returns to his office where one of his friends suggest that he take a girl from the city to his home in the disguise of his girlfriend. The friend manages Gayatri to agree to this. Once they go home, the family arranges their marriage, and despite initially refusing to marry Kannan, Gayatri later agrees and marries him. It is then revealed that the neighbouring family has adapted Gayatri after seeing that she is actually fond of Kannan. Meanwhile Kannan's IT project is being hacked but he finds it out and somehow to votes the plans of the hackers.

== Cast ==
- M. Sasikumar as Kannan
- Nikki Galrani as Gayathri
- Radha Ravi as Nilamegam
- Yogi Babu as Mayakannan
- Nikitha murali as Anitha
- Sathish as Kannan's friend
- Vijayakumar as Kulasekaran, Kannan's father
- Thambi Ramaiah as Kalyanasundaram
- Rekha as Rani
- Sumithra as Kulasekaran's wife and Kannan's mother
- Nirosha as Veeralakhsmi
- Minnal Deepa
- Preethi Shree
- Manobala as Odduvathi Sekar
- Raj Kapoor as Shanmugam
- Jayaprakash as Sivanesan
- Singampuli as Singampuli
- O. A. K. Sundar as Kulla Pandi
- Sridhar Subramaniyam
- Namo Narayana as Karthikeyan
- Chaams as Rangan
- Sabbita Roi
- T. M. Karthik as Deepak
- Saravana Sakthi as Nilamegam's brother

== Soundtrack ==
Raajavamsam

Soundtrack album by Sam C. S.
- Released: 2021
- Genre: Feature film soundtrack
- Length: 8:58
- Language: Tamil
- Label: Lahari Music

Sam C. S. chronology
Sabhaapathy (2021)	Raajavamsam (2021)	Chithirai Sevvanam (2021)

The soundtrack and score was composed by Sam C. S.

Track listing
No.	Title	Lyrics	Singer(s)	Length
1.	"Maane Unna"	Vadivelu, Raja Gurusam	Sam C. S., Anthakudi Ilayaraja, Sathish	04:49
2.	"Mapila Vandha"	Sam C. S.	Mukesh Mohamed, Sam C.S., Sindu Sampath	04:09
3.	"Platena Eandhan Chellaperu"	Madhan Karky	Dhee	03:42
4.	"Oor Thevadha Boomiyila"	Sam C. S.	Chinmayi	03:58

== Release ==
The film was released theatrically on 26 November 2021. The Satellite rights was purchased by SunTV. Television premiere occurred on 15 January 2022.

== Reception ==
Bharat Kumar of News Today said "the movie has moments that would appeal to family audience. But at some places it is trying to be more a melodrama laying thrust on family, bonding and emotions." ABP Live wrote, "Raajavamsam is an exhausting family drama that is not rooted in reality." Avinash Ramachandran of Cinema Express gave a rating of 1.5 out on 5 and wrote, "Raajavamsam prefers sticking to a tried and tested template that just ends up being tired and wasted." Suganth of The Times of India gave a rating of 1 out on 5 and wrote, "The film qualifies as an absolute cringefest with zero redeeming qualities."
