= Raveena Ravi =

Indian dubbing artist and actress (born 1993)

- Born: 11 December 1993 (age 32); Kerala, India
- Education: Ethiraj College
- Occupations: Dubbing artist; Actress
- Years active: 2012–present (dubbing); 2017–present (acting)
- Spouse: Devan Jayakumar (m. 2026)
- Mother: Sreeja Ravi

Raveena Ravi (born 11 December 1993) is an Indian dubbing artist and actress. She has dubbed several television advertisements directed by Rajiv Menon in Tamil, Malayalam and Telugu. She debuted as a voice artist with Saattai (2012) and an actress on-screen with Oru Kidayin Karunai Manu (2017). She is the daughter of notable voice artist Sreeja Ravi.

== Personal life ==
Raveena was born in Chennai to voice artist Sreeja Ravi. She earned an undergraduate degree at Ethiraj College in Chennai. In May 2026, Raveena married director Devan Jayakumar whom she worked with for the 2023 Malayalam film Valatty.

== Filmography ==
=== As actress ===
Key
†	Denotes films that have not yet been released

List of Raveena Ravi film credits as actress
Year	Film	Role	Language	Notes
2017	Oru Kidayin Karunai Manu	Seetha	Tamil	Tamil debut
2018	Nithyaharitha Nayakan	Teresa	Malayalam	Malayalam debut
2020	Kavalthurai Ungal Nanban	Indhu	Tamil	
2021	Rocky	Amudha	Tamil	
2022	Veeramae Vaagai Soodum	Dwaraka	Tamil	
2022	Love Today	Divya	Tamil	
2023	Maamannan	Jyothi	Tamil	
2023	Vattara Vazhakku	Thotichi	Tamil	
2025	Azadi	Ganga	Malayalam	
2025	Vala: Story of a Bangle	Sarala P. Nair	Malayalam	

=== As a voice artist ===
==== Tamil ====
List of Raveena Ravi Tamil film credits as voice artist
Year	Film	For Whom	Role(s)	Notes
1999	Ooty	Child Artist	Unknown	
2012	Saattai	Mahima Nambiar	Arivazhagi	Debut in dubbing
2013	555	Mrithika	Liyana	
2013	555	Erica Fernandes	Manjari	
2013	Ivan Veramathiri	Malavika Menon	Divya	
2014	Idhu Kathirvelan Kadhal	Kalakalyani	Pavithra's friend	
2014	Nimirndhu Nil	Amala Paul	Poomaari	
2014	Saivam	Twara Desai	Abhirami	
2014	Jeeva	Sri Divya	Jeni	
2014	Velaiyilla Pattathari	Surbhi	Anitha	
2014	Sigaram Thodu	Monal Gajjar	Dr. Ambujam	
2014	Kaththi	Samantha	Ankitha	
2015	I	Amy Jackson	Diya	Won Behindwood Gold medal for Best Dubbing Artist
2015	Anegan	Amyra Dastur	Madhumitha/ Samuthra/ Shenbagavalli/ Kalyani	Won Behindwood Gold medal for Best Dubbing Artist
2015	India Pakistan	Sushma Raj	Mellina	
2015	Yatchan	Deepa Sannidhi	Shwetha	
2015	Eetti	Sri Divya	Gayathri Venugopal	
2015	Paayum Puli	Kajal Aggarwal	Sowmya	
2015	Inimey Ippadithan	Ashna Zaveri	Maha	
2016	Kanithan	Catherine Tresa	Anu	
2016	Tamilselvanum Thaniyar Anjalum	Yami Gautam	Kavya	
2016	Kadhalum Kadandhu Pogum	Madonna Sebastian	Yazhini	
2016	Darling 2	Maya	Ayesha	
2016	Pichaikkaran	Satna Titus	Maghizhini	
2016	Wagah	Ranya Rao	Kajal	
2016	Theri	Amy Jackson	Annie	
2016	Devi	Amy Jackson	Jennifer	
2017	Katha Nayagan	Catherine Tresa	Kanmani	
2017	Saravanan Irukka Bayamaen	Regina Cassandra	Thenmozhi	
2017	Adhagappattathu Magajanangalay	Reshma Rathore	Shruthi	
2017	Hara Hara Mahadevaki	Nikki Galrani	Ramya	
2017	Nenjil Thunivirundhal	Mehreen Pirzada	Janani	
2017	Pa. Pandi	Madonna Sebastian	Poonthendral	
2017	Velaiilla Pattadhari 2	Ritu Varma	Anitha	
2018	2.0	Amy Jackson	Nila	
2018	Bhaskar Oru Rascal	Amala Paul	Anu	
2018	Nimir	Namitha Pramod	Malarvizhi	
2018	Imaikkaa Nodigal	Raashii Khanna	Krithika Rao	
2018	Abhiyum Anuvum	Piaa Bajpai	Anu	
2018	Iruttu Araiyil Murattu Kuththu	Vaibhavi Shandilya	Thendral	
2018	Adanga Maru	Raashii Khanna	Anitha	
2018	Maniyaar Kudumbam	Mrudula Murali	Magizhamboo	
2018	Thittam Poattu Thirudura Kootam	Satna Titus	Anjali	
2019	Natpuna Ennanu Theriyuma	Remya Nambeesan	Shruthi	
2019	Neeya 2	Catherine Tresa	Priya	
2019	Kolaigaran	Ashima Narwal	Tharani	
2019	Ayogya	Raashii Khanna	Sindhu	
2019	Sangathamizhan	Raashii Khanna	Kamalini Sanjay	
2020	Varma	Megha Chowdhary	Megha	
2021	Master	Malavika Mohanan	Charulatha	
2021	Kalathil Santhippom	Manjima Mohan	Kavya	
2021	Bhoomi	Nidhi Agerwal	Shakthi	
2021	Eeswaran	Nidhi Agerwal	Poongodi	
2021	Tughlaq Durbar	Raashii Khanna	Kamakshika	
2021	Jai Bhim	Rajisha Vijayan	Mythra	
2021	Enemy	Mirnalini Ravi	Ashvitha	
2022	Anbarivu	Kashmira Pardeshi	Dr. Kayal	
2022	Ayngaran	Mahima Nambiar	Madhumitha	
2022	The Warriorr	Krithi Shetty	Mahalakshmi	Tamil version
2022	Cobra	Srinidhi Shetty	Bhavana Menon	
2022	Varalaru Mukkiyam	Kashmira Pardeshi	Yamuna	
2022	Raangi	Trisha	Thaiyal Nayagi	
2023	Bagheera	Amyra Dastur	Ramya	
2023	Kathar Basha Endra Muthuramalingam	Siddhi Idnani	Tamilselvi	
2023	Jawan	Deepika Padukone	Aishwarya Rathore	Tamil version
2024	Emakku Thozhil Romance	Avantika Mishra	Leona Joseph	
2025	Game Changer	Kiara Advani	Dr Deepika	Tamil version
2025	Diesel	Athulya Ravi	Malar	
2025	Bison	Rajisha Vijayan	Raaji	
2025	The Door	Bhavana	Mithra	
2025	Kombuseevi	Tharika	Laila	
2026	Gatta Kusthi 2	Mokksha	Meenu	

==== Malayalam ====
List of Raveena Ravi Malayalam film credits as voice artist
Year	Film	For Whom	Notes
1999	Vanaprastham		Child Artist
1999	F. I. R.		Child Artist
2001	Dubai		Child Artist
2013	Ezhu Sundara Rathrikal	Parvathy Nambiar	
2013	Aaru Sundarimaarude Katha	Umang Jain	
2014	London Bridge	Nanditha Raj	
2014	Asha Black	Ishita Chauhan	
2014	Bhaiyya Bhaiyya	Vinutha Lal	
2015
2015	Mariyam Mukku	Sana Althaf	
2015	Bhaskar the Rascal	Nayanthara	
2015	Nee-Na	Deepti Sati	
2015	Madhura Naranga	Parvathy Ratheesh	
2015	Life of Josutty	Nayanthara	
2015	Salt Mango Tree	Lakshmi Priyaa Chandramouli	
2016	Style	Priyanka Kandwal	
2016	Valleem Thetti Pulleem Thetti	Shamili	
2016	Thoppil Joppan	Andrea Jeremiah	
2016	White	Huma Qureshi	
2017	Jomonte Suvisheshangal	Aishwarya Rajesh	
2017	Pullikkaran Staraa	Deepti Sati	
2017	Mom	Sajal Ali	Dubbed Film
2017	Richie	Shraddha Srinath	
2018	Kuttanadan Marpappa	Aditi Ravi	
2018	Abhiyude Katha Anuvinteyum	Pia Bajpiee	
2018	Kayamkulam Kochunni	Priya Anand	
2018	Mandharam	Anarkali Marikar	
2018	Njan Prakashan	Anju Kurian	
2019	Irupathiyonnaam Noottaandu	Rachel David	
2019	Saaho	Shraddha Kapoor	Dubbed Film
2019	Love Action Drama	Nayanthara	
2019	Jack & Daniel	Anju Kurian	
2019	Jimmy Ee Veedinte Aishwaryam	Divya Pillai	
2019	Thrissur Pooram	Swathi Reddy	
2020	Big Brother	Mirnaa Menon	
2022	Shyam Singha Roy	Krithi Shetty	Malayalam version
2022	Gargi	Aishwarya Lekshmi	Dubbed version
2023	Valatty	Cocker Spaniel	
2023	Kallanum Bhagavathiyum	Mokksha	
2024	Varshangalkku Shesham	Kalyani Priyadarshan	
2024	Lucky Baskhar	Meenakshi Chaudhary	Malayalam version

==== Telugu ====
List of Raveena Ravi Telugu film credits as voice artist
Year	Film	For Whom	Notes
2015	OK Bangaram	VJ Ramya	Dubbed Film
2016	Premam	Madonna Sebastian	
2018	2.0	Amy Jackson	Dubbed Film
2018	Nawab	Aishwarya Rajesh	Dubbed Film
2021	Shyam Singha Roy	Madonna Sebastian	
2023	Jawan	Deepika Padukone	Dubbed film

== See also ==
- List of Indian Dubbing Artists
