= Lakshmi (2018 film) =

2018 film by A. L. Vijay

- Poster
- Directed by: Vijay
- Written by: Vijay
- Dialogues by: Vijay; Ajayan Bala
- Story by: Vijay; Nirav Shah
- Produced by: Prateek Chakravorty; Shruti Nallappa; R. Ravindran
- Starring: Prabhu Deva; Aishwarya Rajesh; Ditya Bhande; Salman Yusuff Khan
- Cinematography: Nirav Shah
- Edited by: Anthony
- Music by: Sam C. S.
- Production companies: Pramod Films; Trident Arts
- Release date: 24 August 2018
- Running time: 130 minutes
- Country: India
- Languages: Tamil; Telugu

Lakshmi is a 2018 Indian Tamil-language musical dance film written and directed by Vijay. The film stars Ditya Bhande as the titular character along with Prabhu Deva and Aishwarya Rajesh in the lead roles alongside a supporting cast including Salman Yusuff Khan and Karunakaran. The film features music composed by Sam C. S. and cinematography by Nirav Shah. The film released on 24 August 2018 on the eve of Varalakshmi Vratam and based on the theme of goddess Lakshmi. The film was partially reshot in Telugu under the same title with Satyam Rajesh replacing Karunakaran.

== Plot ==
12-year-old Lakshmi (Ditya Bhande) lives and breathes "dance" and dreams of winning the "Pride of Life India Jr." title in the national level dance competition. However, her single mother Nandini (Aishwarya Rajesh) detests music and dance. Soon, Lakshmi forms an unlikely bond with the people in a cafe near her school. Though Lakshmi approaches it for the music played in the store, she soon becomes a regular visitor. Vijay Krishna alias VK (Prabhu Deva) welcomes her when he becomes impressed by her moves, followed reluctantly by waiter Azhagu (Karunakaran). Lakshmi gains VK's sympathy, and he accepts her request for him to help her achieve her dreams with VK posing as her father.

She soon enrolls herself in a dance academy with the help of VK that trains and selects students for the national-level competition. She befriends a lot of the students from the academy and soon gains a good name. She soon makes it to the team that represents the academy.

On the day of selections, Lakshmi has cold feet and fails to perform due to stage fright, leading to her team's disqualification. In anger, Sofia asks her to leave and never return. When VK learns of this, he comes to the selection arena and requests to give Lakshmi another chance. It is revealed that VK was a dancer who had participated in Pride of India in 2005 but could not make up to the finals due to an accident, which led him to a coma. The selections chief, Yusuf Khan(Salman Yusuff Khan), on seeing VK, accepts and makes him an offer that Lakshmi and her team could come on board the competition if he agrees to be the coach for the team with Sofia. Yusuf was often irritated with VK's popularity back in the Pride of India 2005, and his jealousy upon him may have been why he came up with this suggestion, as it gives him a chance to beat VK this time with his own dance team. VK agrees to be the coach and is able to help the team. In one of the rounds, the kids in Yusuf's team scatter the stage with pins before VK's team performs. Lakshmi and Arjun star together in the romantic dance but struggle greatly with the rest of their team, due to the pain from the sharp pins. They all manage to complete the dance but have bloodstains all over by the end of it. VK and Sophia seem to be the only ones who notice. They manage to make it to the final round, though in immense pain from the pins.

The opponents who scattered the pins feel guilty and ask for forgiveness. Later when VK's team was training for the final, Nandini comes to the practicing site. As Lakshmi participated without consent, she was angry. Then she meets VK and then it is revealed that VK was Nandini's ex-fiancé and Lakshmi's father. It was his over-dedication to dance that caused their separation. Angry Nandini then walks out of the place with Lakshmi forcefully. Lakshmi tries to return. This ends up in an accident where a vehicle carrying gas cylinders explodes.

Lakshmi is saved from further injuries by VK. However, Lakshmi is rushed to the hospital, where Nandini and VK learn that she has lost her hearing ability. She is not allowed to perform but asks VK why she cannot as it was her hearing she lost and not her legs. She surprises everybody by still arriving on the stage fully in costume, ready to dance. The audience is shocked at how she is able to dance without hearing the music. VK is seen standing in the middle, amongst the audience, mimicking the dance for her. When VK is restrained and unable to mimic the dance movements for Lakshmi, but is surprised to see Lakshmi still dancing. He then notices Yusuf counting the beats for her so she can still dance in time without hearing the music and the children in his team assisting the children in VK's team in holding back the men trying to stop VK from assisting Lakshmi in her dance. In the end, Lakshmi wins the "Pride of Life India Jr." title.

== Cast ==
- Prabhu Deva as Vijay Krishna "VK"
- Aishwarya Rajesh as S. Nandini, Vijay Krishna's wife
- Ditya Bhande as Lakshmi, a dancer and Vijay Krishna and Nandini's daughter
- Kovai Sarala as A. Saraswathi, the principal of Lakshmi's school
- Karunakaran as Azhagu, the café waiter
- Sam Paul as Channel 99 Head
- Salman Yusuff Khan as Yusuf Khan, VK's opponent team leader
- Sophiya as Sofia, Arjun's mother
- George Maryan as Laundryman
- Chaams as the bus conductor
- Jeet Das as Arjun, a dancer
- Akshat Singh as Arnold, a dancer
- Jiya Thakur as Chennai dance team member
- Jidyasa Bhoi as Chennai dance team member
- Asish Das as Mumbai dance team member
- Raj Ostwal as Mumbai dance team member
- Anitha Sampath as Channel 99 news anchor
- Richa Meena as Pride of India emcee
- Satyam Rajesh as
  - an audience member (special appearance in "Iraiva Iraiva")
  - Papa Rao, the café waiter (Telugu version)
- Ishari K. Ganesh as the award presenter (special appearance)

Arya, Masoom, Navjot, Ritesh, Arnav, Kunal and Dipali play the other members of the Chennai dance team. Kumkum, Adit, Udit, Shahid, Vivek, Dheriya, Anshul, Aabir, Laksh, Tejas, Ranjit and Swam play the other members of the Mumbai dance team.

== Production ==
In September 2017, A. L. Vijay and Prabhu Deva began production work on a new film. Denying reports that it would be a sequel to Devi (2016), the film was launched in a ceremony on 22 September 2017 with Aishwarya Rajesh also revealed to be a part of the cast. Nirav Shah was signed as the cinematographer, while Sam C. S. and Anthony were signed as the music composer and editor respectively. The film was revealed to be a joint production by R. Ravindran of Trident Arts and Shruti Nallappa from Pramod Films, who had earlier secured Vijay's dates for the dropped proposed remake of the Malayalam film Charlie with Madhavan and Sai Pallavi. Described as a dance film for children, Prabhu Deva worked alongside child dancer Ditya Bhande, winner of the Hindi reality dance show Super Dancer, in the lead role. Other young dancers including Akshat Singh and Jeet Das, also worked on the film.

The shoot of the film was completed on 6 February 2018, with the producers gifting Prabhu Deva a large painting of himself.

== Soundtrack ==
Lakshmi

Soundtrack album by Sam CS
- Released: 2018
- Genre: Feature film soundtrack
- Length: 24:40 (Tamil); 24:39 (Telugu)
- Languages: Tamil; Telugu
- Label: Muzik 247

Sam CS chronology
Kadikara Manithargal (2018)	Lakshmi (2018)	Vanjagar Ulagam (2018)
External audio
- Lakshmi – Jukebox on YouTube

The soundtrack of the movie is composed by Sam CS of Vikram Vedha fame and all lyrics were written by Madhan Karky. The album consists of seven tracks, six of which are songs and one is a theme song. The music rights of the soundtrack album were acquired by the music label Muzik247.

Track listing
No.	Title	Singer(s)	Length
1.	"Morrakka Mattraakka"	Uthara Unnikrishnan	03:05
2.	"Aala Aala"	G. V. Prakash Kumar, Saindhavi	03:12
3.	"Pappara Pappaa"	Praniti, Riyaz, Sri Vishnu, Pranav	02:46
4.	"Dreamy Chellamma"	Saindhavi	03:53
5.	"Nilladhey Nilladhey"	Sathyaprakash Dharmar	03:30
6.	"Iraiva Iraiva"	Sam CS	04:19
7.	"The Rhythm Of Dance"	Jecin George	04:02
Total length:			24:40

"I Wonder" - OST on Cafe Radio by Spike Universe featuring Hary Nair (03:48) - SPIKEuniverse | Records 2017 ©℗

Lakshmi (Telugu)
No.	Song name	Singer(s)	Length
1.	"Morrakka Mattraakka"	Uthara Unnikrishnan	03:02
2.	"Aala Aala"	Anand Aravindakshan, Swagatha S. Krishnan	03:11
3.	"Pappara Pappaa"	Praniti, Riyaz, Sri Vishnu, Pranav, Nivin	02:45
4.	"Dreamy Chinnari"	Nincy Vincent	03:53
5.	"Poraadu Poraadu"	Sarath Santhosh	03:28
6.	"Dheva Dheva"	Yazin Nizar	04:18
7.	"The Rhythm Of Dance"	Jecin George	04:02

== Release ==
The film was released on August 24, 2018.

== Reception ==
Gopinath Rajendran of The New Indian Express rated the film three out of five stars and concluded the review stating that "Despite being extremely predictable, Lakshmi is a feel-good entertainer that will get you moonwalking out of the theatre." Manoj Kumar R. of The Indian Express gave the film two-and-a-half out of five stars and noted, "If the audience wants to see a bunch of lovable kids dancing their heart out, they can do it in the comfort of their homes." He concluded the review questioning "Is it too much to ask for a dance film with a decent plot?"

A critic from The Times of India gave it two-and-a-half out of five stars and wrote, "What stops Lakshmi from being a very good film is the predictability of its script and the lack of strong emotional conflict between the lead actors." Janani K. of India Today gave it two-and-a-half out of five stars and wrote, "Lakshmi deserves a watch for Prabhdheva's dancing skills". She concluded the review by saying, "Lakshmi also makes us wonder if it is impossible to make a dance film that has an intriguing script too."

Anupama Subramanian of Deccan Chronicle wrote, "If you are a dance lover, watch Lakshmi for the sake of the rocker Ditya, Prabhu Deva and other passionate dancers." Vishal Menon of The Hindu wrote, "The envious competitor, a selfish teacher, the corrupt event organiser, they’re all there and more. There’s always a sense of ‘ ‘we’ve-seen-this-before’ feeling while watching the film and that’s why we switch off so easily when it’s not a dance sequence on the screen." Sreedhar Pillai of Firstpost wrote, "Lakshmi is another template dance movie from choreographer-turned-actor Prabhudeva".

== See also ==
- ABCD (franchise)
