= Sam C. S. =

Indian singer, music composer and lyricist

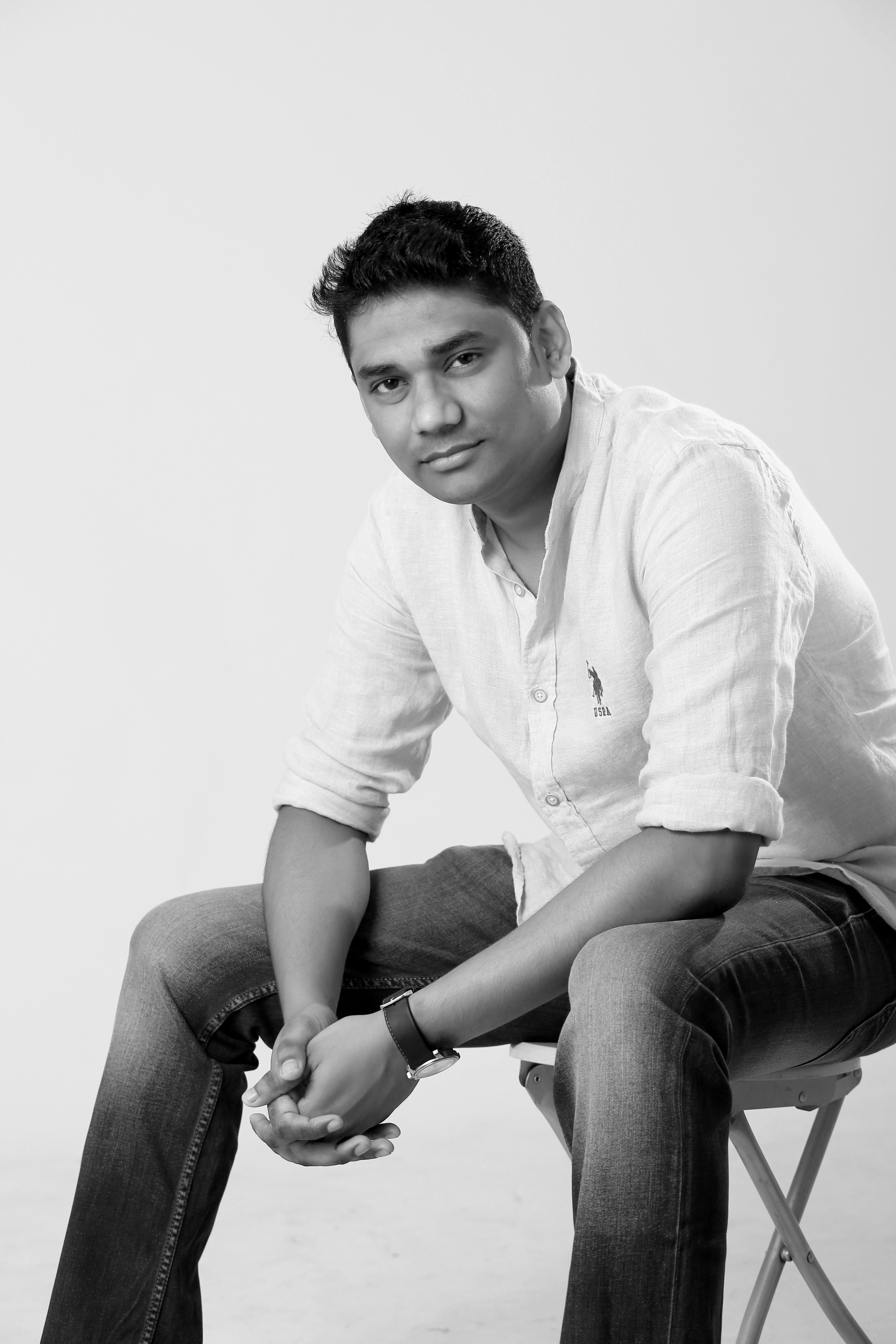

Background information
- Born: 30 July 1987 (age 39); Munnar, Kerala, India
- Genre: Filmi
- Occupations: score composer; music producer; lyricist; singer
- Years active: 2010–present

Sam C. S. is an Indian music composer, producer, lyricist and singer who predominantly works in Tamil, Telugu and Malayalam films. He debuted in Tamil with the horror film Orr Eravuu before working on the scientific thriller Ambuli.

His most notable scores include Kaithi, Puriyatha Puthir, Vikram Vedha (and its 2022 remake), Odiyan, Adanga Maru, NOTA, RDX, Pushpa 2: The Rule, and Mahavatar Narsimha.

== Early life ==
Sam was born into in a Tamil family in Munnar, Kerala, India. He attended St. Aloysius Higher Secondary School in Royappan Patti, Theni, Tamil Nadu. He later earned a degree in MCA and MBA from St. Joseph's College, Tiruchirappalli. He worked for a software company after his graduation. He currently lives in Cumbum, Theni.

== Career ==
Sam assisted other music composers on scores for movies. His talent was soon discovered by movie houses, which led to an opportunity to compose music for musical thriller Mellisai, later renamed Puriyatha Puthir.

During this time, he composed jingles, which led him to meet the director duo Pushkar-Gayathri, who offered him the opportunity to score Vikram Vedha. The film's album and original soundtracks went on to become chart toppers.

Sam got his next opportunity in 2018 when director V. A. Shrikumar Menon offered him Mohanlal-starrer Odiyan to score.

== Discography ==
=== As a composer ===
==== Films ====
Year	Title	Score	Songs	Language	Notes
2010	Orr Eravuu	No	Yes	Tamil	Two songs
2012	Ambuli	No	Yes	Tamil	Two songs
2014	Aaaah	Yes	No	Tamil	Uncredited
2016	Kadalai	Yes	Yes	Tamil	
2017	Vikram Vedha	Yes	Yes	Tamil	
2017	Puriyatha Puthir	Yes	Yes	Tamil	Soundtrack released under the name Mellisai
2018	6 Athiyayam	No	Yes	Tamil	One song; promotional
2018	Keni	Yes	No	Tamil	
2018	Diya	Yes	Yes	Tamil, Telugu	Tamil soundtrack released under the name Karu
2018	Iravukku Aayiram Kangal	Yes	Yes	Tamil	
2018	Mr. Chandramouli	Yes	Yes	Tamil	
2018	Kadikara Manithargal	Yes	Yes	Tamil	
2018	Lakshmi	Yes	Yes	Tamil	
2018	Vanjagar Ulagam	Yes	Yes	Tamil	
2018	NOTA	Yes	Yes	Tamil	
2018	Odiyan	Yes	No	Malayalam	
2018	Adanga Maru	Yes	Yes	Tamil	
2019	Ispade Rajavum Idhaya Raniyum	Yes	Yes	Tamil	
2019	K-13	Yes	Yes	Tamil	
2019	100	Yes	Yes	Tamil	25th Film
2019	Ayogya	Yes	Yes	Tamil	
2019	Devi 2	Yes	Yes	Tamil / Telugu	
2019	Gorilla	Yes	Yes	Tamil	
2019	Kaithi	Yes	Yes	Tamil	
2019	Arjun Suravaram	Yes	Yes	Telugu	
2019	Jada	Yes	Yes	Tamil	
2021	Sám Hối: The Living Sandbag	Yes	Yes	Vietnamese	
2021	Mosagallu	Yes	Yes	Telugu	
2021	Kasada Thapara	No	Yes	Tamil	Streaming release; Composed one song, "Vidhi Ezhuthiya"
2021	Enemy	Yes	No	Tamil	
2021	Sabhaapathy	Yes	Yes	Tamil	
2021	Raajavamsam	Yes	Yes	Tamil	
2021	Chithirai Sevvanam	Yes	Yes	Tamil	
2022	Carbon	Yes	Yes	Tamil	
2022	Saani Kaayidham	Yes	Yes	Tamil	
2022	Rocketry: The Nambi Effect	Yes	Yes	Tamil / Hindi / English	
2022	Ramarao on Duty	Yes	Yes	Telugu	
2022	Yenni Thuniga	Yes	Yes	Tamil	
2022	Vikram Vedha	Yes	Yes	Hindi	Two songs: "Bande", "Yaara"
2022	Repeat Shoe	Yes	Yes	Tamil	
2023	Michael	Yes	Yes	Telugu	
2023	Run Baby Run	Yes	Yes	Tamil	
2023	Bakasuran	Yes	Yes	Tamil	
2023	Thugs	Yes	Yes	Tamil	
2023	Pakalum Paathiravum	Yes	No	Malayalam	
2023	Agilan	Yes	Yes	Tamil	
2023	Kondraal Paavam	Yes	Yes	Tamil	
2023	Ghosty	Yes	Yes	Tamil	50th Film
2023	Rudhran	Yes	No	Tamil	
2023	Thiruvin Kural	Yes	Yes	Tamil	
2023	Thandatti	Yes	No	Tamil	
2023	Nene Naa	Yes	Yes	Telugu	
2023	RDX	Yes	Yes	Malayalam	
2023	Tamil Kudimagan	Yes	Yes	Tamil	
2023	Red Sandal Wood	Yes	Yes	Tamil	
2023	The Road	Yes	Yes	Tamil	
2023	Raid	Yes	Yes	Tamil	
2023	Bandra	Yes	Yes	Malayalam	
2023	Vela	Yes	Yes	Malayalam	
2023	Phoenix	Yes	Yes	Malayalam	
2023	Parking	Yes	Yes	Tamil	
2024	Siren	Yes	No	Tamil	
2024	Guardian	Yes	Yes	Tamil	75th Film
2024	Idi Minnal Kadhal	Yes	Yes	Tamil	
2024	Demonte Colony 2	Yes	Yes	Tamil	
2024	Kondal	Yes	Yes	Malayalam	
2024	Thekku Vadakku	Yes	Yes	Malayalam	
2024	Black	Yes	Yes	Tamil	
2024	KA	Yes	Yes	Telugu	
2024	Pani	Yes	Yes	Malayalam	Co-composed with Vishnu Vijay
2024	Pushpa 2: The Rule	Yes	No	Telugu	Additional background score
2025	Ennu Swantham Punyalan	Yes	Yes	Malayalam	
2025	Madraskaaran	Yes	Yes	Tamil	
2025	Vanangaan	Yes	No	Tamil	
2025	Get-Set Baby	Yes	Yes	Malayalam	
2025	Dilruba	Yes	Yes	Telugu	
2025	Jack	Yes	Yes	Telugu	
2025	Ace	Yes	Yes	Tamil	2 songs "Poka Rap" and "Paarvai Thani"
2025	Phoenix	Yes	Yes	Tamil	
2025	Trending	Yes	Yes	Tamil	
2025	Mahavatar Narsimha	Yes	Yes	Hindi, Kannada, Tamil, Telugu	
2025	Blackmail	Yes	Yes	Tamil	
2025	Padaiyaanda Maaveeraa	Yes	No	Tamil	
2025	Banduan	Yes	No	Malay	Along With Litia Ramachandran and Remake of Kaithi
2025	Retta Thala	Yes	Yes	Tamil	
2026	Baby Girl	Yes	Yes	Malayalam	
2026	Kaalidas 2	Yes	Yes	Tamil	
2026	Karakkam	Yes	Yes	Malayalam	
2026	Habeebi	Yes	Yes	Tamil	
2026	Double Occupancy	Yes	Yes	Tamil	
2026	Varavu	Yes	Yes	Malayalam	
2026	Immortal	Yes	Yes	Tamil	
2026	Sardar 2	Yes	Yes	Tamil	100th Film
2026	Enna Vilai	Yes	Yes	Tamil	
2026	The Vvaan: Force of the Forrest	No	Yes	Hindi	
2026	Sathyavan Savithiri †	Yes	Yes	Tamil	
2026	Karathey Babu †	Yes	Yes	Tamil	
2026	Bullet †	Yes	Yes	Tamil	
2026	Bloody Politics †	Yes	Yes	Tamil	
2026	Rapo23 †	Yes	Yes	Telugu	
2027	Demonte Colony 3 †	Yes	Yes	Tamil	
2027	Mahavatar Parshuram †	Yes	Yes	Hindi, Kannada, Tamil, Telugu	
TBA	Saloon †	Yes	Yes	Tamil	
TBA	Gods and Soldiers †	Yes	Yes	Tamil; Telugu	Bilingual film

==== Web series ====
Year	Work	Language	Network	Notes
2022	Suzhal: The Vortex	Tamil	Amazon Prime Video	
2022	Five Six Seven Eight	Tamil	ZEE5	
2023	The Night Manager	Hindi	Disney+ Hotstar	
2023	Label	Tamil	Disney+ Hotstar	
2026	Exam	Tamil	Amazon Prime Video	

=== As a singer ===
Year	Film	Songs
2010	Orr Eravuu	"Ucchi Malayil"
2010	Orr Eravuu	"Kaadhala"
2012	Ambuli	"Ambuli Theme"
2016	Kadalai	"Kannukulla Vanthu"
2016	Kadalai	"Aathankarai"
2017	Vikram Vedha	"Karuppu Vellai"
2017	Vikram Vedha	"Yethu Nyayam"
2017	Vikram Vedha	"Oru Katha Sollatta"
2018	Iravukku Aayiram Kangal	"Yea Pa Yeppappa"
2018	Iravukku Aayiram Kangal	"Nights of Neverland"
2018	Iravukku Aayiram Kangal	"Winds of the Darkest Hour"
2018	Mr. Chandramouli	"Kallooliye"
2018	Mr. Chandramouli	"Kandapadi"
2018	Mr. Chandramouli	"Yedhedho Aanene"
2018	Mr. Chandramouli	"Mr. Chandramouli Theme"
2018	Kadikara Manithargal	"Theera Oru"
2018	Kadikara Manithargal	"Yeanoo"
2018	Lakshmi	"Iraiva Iraiva"
2018	NOTA	"Yaar Kalikku"
2018	Adanga Maru	"Aangu Vaangu"
2019
2019	K-13	"Oru Saayangalam"
2019	100	"Nanba"
2019	Devi 2	"Love, Love Me"
2019	Abhinetri 2	"Love, Love Me"
2019	Kaithi	"The Hot Biriyani"
2019	Kaithi	"Eternal Love of Father"
2019	Kaithi	"Neel Iravil"
2019	Kaithi	"Night is Dark"
2019	Arjun Suravaram	"Bang Bang"
2021	Rajavamsam	"Mane Unna"
2021	Rajavamsam	"Mapilla Vandha"
2022	Repeat Shoe	"Theeyaai Ododi"
2022	Bakasuran	"Siva Sivayam"
2022	Bakasuran	"Kaathama"
2022	Ghosty	"Bramman"
2023	Run Baby Run	"Run Baby Run - Theme"
2023	Thugs	"Amman Song"
2023	Agilan	"Dhrogam"
2023	Parking	"Yevan Nallavan"
2024	KA	"Ka Mass Jathara"
2024	Black	"Majili Majili"
2024	Demonte Colony 2	"Naraga Melangal"
2024	Demonte Colony 2	"Nodigaley"
2024	Demonte Colony 2	"Mirugan"

=== As a lyricist ===
Year	Film	Songs
2017	Puriyatha Puthir	"Mazhaikkulle"
2017	Vikram Vedha	"Pogatha Yennavittu"
2018	Iravukku Aayiram Kangal	"Uyir Uruvaatha"
2018	"Yea Pa Yeppappa"	
2018	"Yaen Penne Neeyum"	
2018	Mr. Chandramouli	"Kallooliye"
2018	"Theeraadho Vali"	
2018	NOTA	"Yaar Kalikku"
2019	100	"Nanba"
2019	Ispade Rajavum Idhaya Raniyum	"Kannamma"
2019	Ispade Rajavum Idhaya Raniyum	"Yendi Raasathi"
2019	Ispade Rajavum Idhaya Raniyum	"Yeno Penne"
2019	Gorilla	"Yaaradiyo"
2019	Gorilla	"Chimp Song"
2023	Bakasuran	"Kaathama"
2023	Parking	"Chella Kalliye"
2023	Parking	"Yevan Nallavan"
2024	Black	"En Chella Kedi"

== Awards ==
Provoke Awards

- 2017: Vikram Vedha (Best Upcoming Music Director)

Hello FM Awards

- 2017: Vikram Vedha (Best Music Director)

Ananda Vikatan Cinema Awards

- 2017: Vikram Vedha (Promising Music Director)

Vijay Awards

- 2017: Vikram Vedha (Best Background Score)

IIFA Awards

- 2023 : Vikram Vedha (Best Background Score)

Filmfare Awards South

- 2024 : RDX: Robert Dony Xavier Best Music Director (Malayalam)
