= Five Six Seven Eight =

Indian coming-of-age web series

- Genre: Coming-of-age; Drama; Dance
- Created by: Vijay
- Written by: Vijay; Mrudhula Sridharan
- Directed by: Vijay; Prasanna JK; Mrudhula Sridharan
- Starring: Ditya Bhande; Nagendra Prasad; Chinni Prakash; Vivek Jogdande; Meetha Raghunath; Sree Ram
- Music by: Sam C. S.
- Country of origin: India
- Original language: Tamil
- No. of seasons: 1

Production
- Producers: A. L. Alagappan; Hitesh Thakkur
- Cinematography: Sandeep K. Vijay
- Editor: Anthony
- Production companies: D Studios; Think Big Studio

Original release
- Network: ZEE5
- Release: 18 November 2022

Five Six Seven Eight is an Indian Tamil-language television series directed by Vijay, Prasanna JK, and Mrudhula Sridharan and produced by A.L. Alagappan and Hitesh Thakkur, starring Ditya Bhande, Nagendra Prasad and Chinni Prakash. It follows the lives of gifted middle-class youngsters turned financially disadvantaged dancers who work hard to overcome difficulty and achieve their dreams. It premiered on ZEE5 on 18 November 2022.

== Cast ==
- Ditya Bhande as Semba
- Nagendra Prasad as coach Prasath
- Chinni Prakash as Balan master, security
- Vivek Jogdande as Vikram
- Meetha Raghunath as Swetha
- Sree Raam as Dinesh, Semba's brother
- Shreya
- Hunar Sharma
- Prajna Ravi
- Sai Pallavi
- Vidyuth Vivek
- Mona Kakade
- Akshat Singh as Semba's friend

== Promotion ==
In early 2022, ZEE5 announced a slate of eleven upcoming Tamil series and films, with Five Six Seven Eight being one of them, scheduled for a release on 18 November 2022. The makers unveiled the first look posters through social media platforms and the official teaser was released on 17 October 2022 which shows a conflict of sorts between two dance groups who come from different socio-economic backgrounds.

== Reception ==
A critic from Cinema Express wrote: "As a whole, the Five Six Seven Eight series has its heart in the right place."
