= RlungTa =

Album by Samved

Studio album by Samved
- Released: 12 April 2014
- Recorded: June 2013 – January 2014
- Genre: Fusion, electronica
- Label: Universal Music India
- Producer: Ritvik Joe, KK

RlungTa is the first studio album by Mumbai-based fusion band Samved. The album was released on 12 April 2014 by Universal Music Group. RlungTa is a blend of Hindustani Classical and electronica textured with the sound of the Sarangi. The album was produced by electronic artists/music producers Ritvik Joe and KK, the band's founders. The album was well received in the Indian subcontinent and in Europe. It won the band Best Folk/Fusion Artist of the Year for 2014 at Radio City Freedom Awards along with The Best Produced Album in the band category at the IIRA awards in 2015.

== Personnel ==
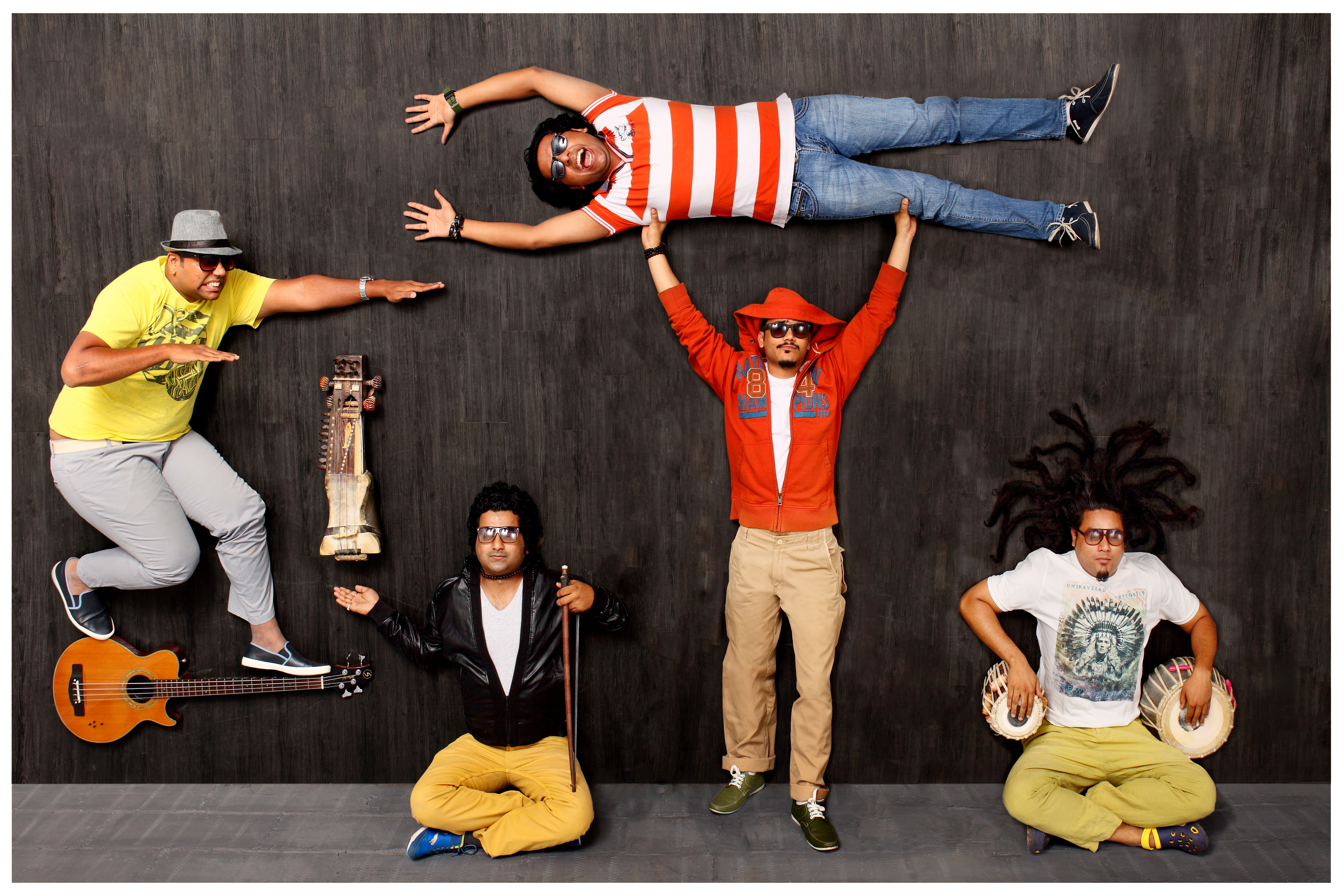
Samved Band

- Ritvik Joe – Keys, electronic (effects/samples), guitars
- KK – Electronic and bass
- Zeeshan Khan – Vocalist
- Christie Bourcq – Featured vocals
- Sangeet Mishra – Sarangi
- Kirti Das – Percussions

Production

- Ritvik Joe – Producer
- KK – Producer
- Ayan De – Mixed and mastered

Art work

- Peg Green – Album artwork
- Shekhar Karalkar – Inlay photographs

Lyrics

- "Love Science" – Ustad Maqbool Hussain Khan
- "Wind Horse Flight" – Mahajabeen Khan
- "Infinite Days" – Christie Bourcq (French) and Ritvik Joe(English)
- "Gyratin’ Solang" – Christie Bourcq (French)

== Track listing ==
All tracks are written and performed by Samved.

1. "Kama Unit
2. "Love Science
3. "Anamudi Access
4. "Eastern Clouds
5. "Maal Kausa
6. "Wind Horse Flight
7. "7 Brick Walls
8. "Infinite Days" featuring Christie Bourcq
9. "Gyratin’ Solang" featuring Christie Bourcq

== Recognition ==
Year	Nominated work	Award	Result
2014	Samved – "Kama Unit"	Radio City Freedom Awards: Best Folk Fusion Artist of the year 2014	Won
2015	Samved - RlungTa	IIRA: Best Produced Album (Band)	Won
