= Mr. Chandramouli =

2018 film directed by Thiru

- Theatrical release poster
- Directed by: Thiru
- Written by: Thiru
- Produced by: G. Dhananjayan
- Starring: Karthik; Gautham Karthik; Regina Cassandra; Varalaxmi Sarathkumar; Santhosh Prathap
- Cinematography: Richard M. Nathan
- Edited by: T. S. Suresh
- Music by: Sam C. S.
- Production companies: Creative Entertainers; Kesavan; Aarthi; Maharajothi
- Release date: 6 July 2018
- Running time: 135 minutes
- Country: India
- Language: Tamil

Mr. Chandramouli is a 2018 Indian Tamil-language sports comedy thriller film written and directed by Thiru and produced by G. Dhananjayan. It stars Karthik as the title character, his son Gautham Ram Karthik, Regina Cassandra, Varalaxmi Sarathkumar, and Santhosh Prathap. The film revolves around a professional boxer who finds himself in a quandary when an unexpected turn of events gets him tangled in a battle between his passion, family and his love interest.

Mr. Chandramouli was announced in October 2017. The film, shot between November 2017 and March 2018, was released on 6 July the same year.

== Plot ==
Raghav wakes up severely injured in a hospital. The next scenes form a flashback to events that took place several weeks previously.

Azhagar, the CEO of an online taxi company, wins an industry award. Vinayak Kanakasabai, a rival CEO, challenges him that his company, GoCabs, will overtake Azhagar's company. Azhagar orders his assistant Pugazhendhi to do something to stop this. Pugazhendhi hires criminal suspects to commit crimes in GoCabs taxis as drivers, and news of these incidents goes viral, leading to a police investigation and a lawsuit against Vinayak.

Raghav is a talented boxer who lives with his father, Chandramouli. He seeks sponsorship from Azhgar for a major fight, but is rejected; he then approaches Vinayak and is successful in securing sponsorship. Raghav wins and gives the prize, a new car, to his father. Moved by the gift, Chandramouli invites him out for a drive at midnight. The car is run over by a truck, killing Chandramouli and severely injuring Raghav.

Upon waking up in hospital, Raghav learns that his father died and that his nervous system is incurably injured, severely restricting his vision. Several days later, an officer calls at his house with Chandramouli's signature on the death certificate of a woman named Bairavi. Raghav, his girlfriend Madhu, and his friend Padmani initially tell the officer that he has the wrong house, but after reviewing the papers, Raghav confirms that the signature is his father's. It transpires that his father hosted Bairavi's funeral days before his own death, because he was the only person connected with her.

Chandramouli's close friend Ramamurthy confirms that Bairavi, a single woman with no children or parents, was Chandramouli's friend. They got to know each other when she tried to buy his car at a high price because it reminded her of her deceased father, who had the same car. She also helped Raghav get Azhagar's sponsorship because she was the financial manager of Azhagar's company. Bairavi was then apparently killed by a GoCabs driver. However, Chandramouli told Ramamurthy that Bairavi was not killed by the driver, but by someone else he knew. He asked Ramamurthy's help to reveal the truth, so Ramamurthy took him to a senior police officer to report it. The officer warned him not to get involved in this case because important people were behind it. Chandramouli is seen confused on his final day, when he asked Raghav for a late night drive.

Raghav finds and confronts the driver, who tells him that he accidentally lost control over the vehicle. However, Raghav later overhears the driver speaking to Pugazhendhi about their conversation, and chases him, only to find him hanging dead in an isolated factory. Later, Padmani informs him about Bairavi's phone found in Chandramouli's car, which contains evidence of Bairavi's murder. To find out who the murderer is, Raghav plots to trap the next murderer from GoCabs and sends Madhu and her colleagues in GoCabs. Everybody reaches their destination safely except Madhu, who alerts Raghav when the cab driver stops the car in a remote area. Raghav arrives in time to catch the driver, who confesses that he was instructed by Pugazhendhi to do so. Raghav finds Pugazhendhi in a bar and chases him, but he escapes. The next day, he is found dead after he uploads a video of his confession about the murders, blaming Azhagar. Raghav then visits Vinayak, who it turns out is the real culprit. Raghav fights with Vinayak and finally burns him to death. The next day, news channels report that Vinayak had escaped, no one knows his whereabouts, and police are searching for him.

Finally, Raghav is seen smiling happily in Chandramouli's restored car.

== Cast ==
- Karthik as Chandramouli
- Gautham Karthik as Raghav
- Regina Cassandra as Madhu
- Varalaxmi Sarathkumar as Bairavi
- Santhosh Prathap as Vinayak Kanakasabai
- Sathish as Padmani
- Jagan as Partha
- Mahendran as Azhagar
- Mime Gopi as Pugazhendhi
- Agathiyan as Ramamurthy
- G. Dhananjayan as Madhu's father
- John Mahendran as Lawyer
- Viji Chandrasekhar as ACP Dwaraga
- Stunt Silva as Mani
- R. Venkat as Nagarajan

== Production ==
In early October 2017, Thiru was announced to be directing a film starring Karthik and his son Gautham. The film was produced by G. Dhananjayan via Creative Entertainers. It is the first film where Karthik and Gautham acted together. Regina Cassandra and Varalaxmi Sarathkumar were announced as the lead actresses the same month, while Sathish was cast in a further supporting role. Shortly thereafter, the team announced the film's title as Mr. Chandramouli, derived from a dialogue spoken by Karthik in Mouna Ragam (1986). Thiru also cast veteran directors Mahendran and Agathiyan in pivotal acting roles, with the latter being the director's father-in-law. Principal photography began in Chennai in late November 2017, and wrapped in March 2018 in Thailand, where two songs were filmed. Cassandra dubbed for the first time in her own voice.

== Soundtrack ==
The soundtrack album of Mr. Chandramouli was composed by Sam C. S. and released by Sony Music on 25 April 2018. The title track was co-sung by actor Sivakumar's daughter Brindha, who made her playback singing debut with this film.

Track listing
No.	Title	Lyrics	Singer(s)	Length
1.	"Kallooliye"	Sam C. S.	Sam C. S., Swagatha S. Krishnan	03:53
2.	"Kandapadi"	Logan	Sam C. S., Guna	04:50
3.	"Yedhedho Aanene"	Vivek	Sam C. S., Chinmayi	05:03
4.	"Raajadhi Raja"	Vivek	Mukesh Mohamed, Ranjith Govind	03:22
5.	"Theeraadho Vali"	Sam C.S.	Haricharan	04:43
6.	"Mr. Chandramouli Theme"	Vithya Damodharan	Sam C. S., Brindha Sivakumar	03:13
Total length:				25:04

== Release ==
Mr. Chandramouli was initially scheduled to release on 27 April 2018, but vacated that window after Kaala was scheduled for the same date. The film was then indefinitely delayed due to a strike declared by the Tamil Film Producers Council, but eventually released on 6 July 2018 after the 48-day strike ended.

== Reception ==
Srinivasa Ramanujam of The Hindu wrote, "Mr Chandramouli has an interesting casting coup, but doesn't quite come together in its storytelling". M. Suganth of The Times of India wrote, "Despite a promising star cast (including the stunt casting of real-life father and son Karthik and Gautham Karthik) and a competent crew, Mr. Chandramouli is largely underwhelming, mainly because of how formulaic it is. Every beat in the script feels not only familiar but also predictable". Sudhir Suryawanshi of The New Indian Express wrote, "There are a lot of interesting ideas, but in union, they fail to whip up the commercial storm the director must have intended". Anjana Shekar of The News Minute wrote, "While director Thiru has surely improved from Theeradha Vilayattu Pillai, Mr Chandramouli lacks the most important thing that makes a film memorable — a good story".

Ashameera Aiyappan of The Indian Express wrote, "It could have been a film about fatherhood or a sports drama or a societal drama or an unconventional rom-com. Thiru rather throws convenient pieces from all these genres into the pot and serves us clichés". Kirubhakar Purushothaman wrote for India Today, "As the cliche goes, everything looks good on paper with Mr Chandramouli. It lags in execution" He said the film "might have worked had the dialogues been better or if the comedy had worked or if the film didn't aim to tick all the genre boxes". Writing for Firstpost, trade analyst Sreedhar Pillai appreciated the casting coup of Gautham and Karthik, but "director Thiru's formulaic and insipid script isn't exciting enough. The film has a starting problem, just like the old Fiat Padmini car used by Karthik in the story".
