= Ayogya (2019 film) =

2019 Indian Tamil-language action film by Venkat Mohan

- Theatrical release poster
- Directed by: Venkat Mohan
- Written by: Venkat Mohan
- Story by: Vakkantham Vamsi
- Based on: Temper by Puri Jagannadh
- Produced by: B. Madhu
- Starring: Vishal; Raashii Khanna; R. Parthiban; K. S. Ravikumar
- Cinematography: V. I. Karthik
- Edited by: Ruben
- Music by: Sam C. S. S. Thaman (1 song)
- Production company: Light House Movie Makers
- Distributed by: Screen Scene Media Entertainment
- Release date: 11 May 2019
- Running time: 150 minutes
- Country: India
- Language: Tamil

Ayogya (transl. Rogue Man) is a 2019 Indian Tamil-language action thriller film written and directed by Venkat Mohan. An official remake of the 2015 Telugu-language film Temper, the film stars Vishal in the lead role along with Raashii Khanna, R. Parthiban, K. S. Ravikumar and Pooja Devariya. The film's soundtrack was composed by Sam C. S.

The film follows a corrupt police officer whose life changes when he commits his first act of heroism that brings a rape case to his attention.

Initially scheduled to release on 10 April 2019, Ayogya was released on 10 May 2019. Upon its release, the film received generally positive reviews from critics who praised Vishal's and Parthiban's performances, the action sequences, and the changed climax.

== Plot ==
Having believed a police officer's life to be luxurious, with much income in the form of bribes, Karnan, an orphan, grows up to become a corrupt and ruthless Sub-Inspector. He forms an immediate friendship with the local don ECR Kaalirajan by releasing his four brothers, Kumar, Prakash, Vinay, and Sabari, from lock-up, who were all arrested for smuggling. Karnan's attitude does not go well with one of his subordinates, Abdul Kader, a sincere police constable. In vain as it is, he tries to oppose Karnan's deeds.

Meanwhile, Karnan meets and falls in love with Sindhu, who gets kidnapped by Kaalirajan's men on her birthday, but Karnan rescues her. Kaalirajan then scolds his henchmen for kidnapping the wrong person and apologises to them. As her birthday gift, Sindhu requests that Karnan save the girl that Kaalirajan was supposed to kidnap and kill. A reluctant Karnan fights Kaalirajan's goons and saves the girl, Sandhya. Karnan somehow reconciles with Kaalirajan later and learns that Sandhya has evidence against Kaalirajan's brothers. Karnan meets her and discovers that Kaalirajan's four brothers kidnapped, raped, and murdered her sister Bhavani, along with recorded footage of the crime. A camera stored the video, which is with Sandhya now. Karnan takes the camera and arranges to send Sandhya and her mother to the United States.

Before their departure, Sandhya's conversation with Karnan leaves him shattered. Discovering that he was indeed responsible for the rape since he allowed the brothers to escape on the day they kidnapped Bhavani, Karnan is devastated and soon reforms after he fights off Kaalirajan's goons sent to retrieve the camera at the police station, with Kader notifying the change in him. He soon manages to track the brothers and beat them all up before arresting them. After the police discover Bhavani's corpse and perform the autopsy, Karnan produces the camera as evidence, which turns out to be empty. Though no further evidence exists, Karnan asks for a gap of one day to provide the necessary evidence so that Kaalirajan's brothers do not escape as exonerated. Later, Kaalirajan's men attack a drunk Karnan when he is alone. After a brutal fight, they bury him alive, but he manages to escape.

Karnan reaches the court the next day, and to everyone's shock, he adds that he is not one of the four but "five" men who sexually assaulted Bhavani. He then convinces the judge to sentence all five men to capital punishment to ensure that Kaalirajan's brothers do not escape punishment. This statement shakes the entire course of the case, and the public resents Karnan. He is allowed by the commissioner to watch as the police hang all four of the brothers, after which the police hang him too. Merely hours later, Sandhya and her mother arrive in Chennai, publicly revealing Karnan's innocence and his sacrifice to ensure punishment for all accused criminals. The revelation shocks the nation, and the public, who misunderstood him, eventually mourns his death as his corpse is brought to and walked from the gallows. The film ends with Karnan's final words: "All men will now fear an immediate death sentence if they ever molest a girl".

== Cast ==
As per the film's beginning and end credits:

- Vishal as Sub-Inspector Karnan
  - "Tik Tok" Annoor as adolescent Karnan
  - Nithyaraj as young Karnan
- R. Parthiban as ECR Kaalirajan
- K. S. Ravikumar as Head Constable Abdul Kader
- Raashii Khanna as Sindhu, Karnan's love interest (Voice dubbed by Raveena Ravi)
- Pooja Devariya as Sandhya, Bhavani's elder sister
- Anandaraj as "Bullet" Rajendran
- M. S. Bhaskar as Venkatraman
- Yogi Babu as Thief
- Sonia Agarwal as Doctor
- Apoorva as Bhavani
- Sana Khan (special appearance in the song "Vera Level U")
- Santhana Bharathi as Home Minister
- Pavitra Lokesh as Sandhya and Bhavani's mother
- Sachu as Sindhu's grandmother
- Devadarshini as Sindhu's mother
- Aadukalam Naren as Karnan's lawyer
- R. N. R. Manohar as Kaalirajan's lawyer
- Rahul Thatha as Rahul, a thief
- Vela Ramamoorthy as Police Inspector
- Arjai as Kumar, Kaalirajan's brother
- Dheeraj as Prakash, Kaalirajan's brother
- Pintu Pandu as Vinay, Kaalirajan's brother
- Vamsi Krishna as Sabari, Kaalirajan's brother
- Bharathi Kannan as Constable Ulaganathan
- Brigida Saga as Kader's daughter
- Kayal Pereira as DIG
- Vazhakku En Muthuraman
- Aathma Patrick as Henchman
- Radha Ravi as Judge (uncredited)

== Production ==
In September 2017, Vishal confirmed that he would be acting in the remake of Telugu film Temper. The film is directed by Venkat Mohan, a former assistant of A. R. Murugadoss. The film was launched on 23 August 2018 and the shoot began on ECR in the same day. With Raashi Khanna was announced as female lead, it is her third film in Tamil. Filming took place in and around Vishakhapatnam and Tuticorin while some minor portions were shot around Chennai and Pondicherry.

== Soundtrack ==
The film's soundtrack are composed by Sam C. S., with one song, "Vera Level", composed by S. Thaman. The songs "Kanne Kanne" and "Vera Level" are remixed from the Telugu songs "Kanne Kanne" and "Blockbuster" from Arjun Suravaram and Sarrainodu. The audio rights of the film are secured by Lahari Music.

Ayogya

Soundtrack album by Sam C. S.
- Released: 24 April 2019
- Genre: Feature film soundtrack
- Length: 8:13
- Language: Tamil
- Label: Lahari Music
- Producer: Sam C. S.

Sam C. S. chronology
100 (2019)	Ayogya (2019)	Devi 2 (2019)

No.	Title	Lyrics	Music	Singer(s)	Length
1.	"Kanne Kanne"	Vivek	Sam C. S.	Anirudh Ravichander	3:45
2.	"Vera Level U"	Rokesh	S. Thaman	S. Thaman, Deepak, Pooja Vaidyanath	4:28
3.	"Yaaro Yaaro"	Yugabharathi	Sam C. S.	Senthildass Velayutham, Sowmya Ramani	3:51
4.	"Godu Godu"	Yugabharathi	Sam C. S.	Benny Dayal, Nivas	3:57

== Release ==
The film was scheduled for release on 11 January 2019 coinciding with the Pongal weekend, but got delayed. Finally, the film released on 10 May 2019.

== Critical reception ==
Ayogya received generally positive reviews from the audience and critics. Behindwoods rated 3/5 and stated that, "An unexpected good climax makes Ayogya standout a notch high". Thinkal Menon of TOI rated 3/5 and stated that "Ayogya is more or less the same as its original version, including the characterisations and locations, except for the unexpected climax." It received positive reviews from critics who praised Vishal's performance.
