= Sundar Menon =

Indian Entrepreneur and Philanthropist

- Born: 8 March 1962 (age 64); Thrissur, Kerala, India
- Occupation: Businessperson
- Known for: Founder & CEO of Sun Group International
- Children: 2
- Awards: Padma Shri

Sundar Menon (born 1962) is a GCC-based Indian entrepreneur, and the founder of The Sun Group International.

== Early life and education ==
Sundar Menon was born in 1962. He graduated in economics, and further completed an MBA. The European Continental University (EUC-USA) awarded him with an Honorary Doctorate in 2015 for his contributions towards the economic development of the GCC.

== Career ==
Sundar Menon arrived in Qatar in 1986, and worked for various firms. In the early 1990s, he had joined a British Oil Field Service Company based in Doha as a business executive.

He founded the Sun Group International in 1999, with its first company in the United Arab Emirates. The group has operations in the UAE, Qatar, Panama and India. The main business interests of the subsidiaries of Sun group include petrochemicals, natural resources, transportation and real estate.

He was honored with Padmashri award by the Government of India in the year 2016, for his contribution in the field of Social Work. He has been arrested by the Kerala police for financial fraud. At present, he has 18 cases pending against him. It has been reported that he has cheated 7.7 millions of rupees from different people.

== Awards and recognition ==
- Padma Shri Award by the Government of India on 31 March 2016
- Asia Pacific Entrepreneurship Award in 2015
- Forbes Top 100 Indian Business Leaders in the Arab World 2013 Arabian Business Magazine
- 100 most powerful Indians in the Gulf 2012
- Indo British Business Excellence Award
- Forbes magazine Top Indian leaders in the Middle East and UAE
- TGM Award for Maritime Solutions and Philanthropy-AMMA Award 2015
- Arabian Business Award in 2012
- Kerala State Vyapari Vyavasayi Samithi Business Excellence Award
