= Adanga Maru =

2018 Indian Tamil-language film

- Theatrical release poster
- Directed by: Karthik Thangavel
- Written by: Karthik Thangavel
- Produced by: Sujatha Vijaykumar
- Starring: Ravi Mohan; Raashii Khanna
- Cinematography: Sathyan Sooryan
- Edited by: Ruben
- Music by: Sam C. S.
- Production company: Home Movie Makers
- Distributed by: Clap Board Production
- Release date: 21 December 2018
- Running time: 145 minutes
- Country: India
- Language: Tamil

Adanga Maru (transl. Refuse to concede) is a 2018 Indian Tamil-language action thriller film written and directed by Karthik Thangavel in his directorial debut. The film stars Ravi Mohan and Raashii Khanna, with Ponvannan, Babu Antony, Sampath Raj, Azhagam Perumal, Bharath Raj, Shabeer Kallarakkal, Munishkanth, Mime Gopi and Subbu Panchu in supporting roles. It revolves around an egoistic cop who resigns from his job and becomes a ruthless vigilante after his family is murdered.

Adanga Maru began production in December 2017 and was almost complete by May 2018. The music was composed by Sam C. S., with cinematography by Sathyan Sooryan and editing by Ruben. The film was released on 21 December 2018 to positive reviews from critics and became a commercial success.

== Plot ==
Subhash is an honest, newly appointed SI in Chennai. He is sympathetic to the public's suffering and tries to improve their lives, but he hates dishonest, corrupt and arrogant people. These efforts sometimes conflict with the law and cause Subhash trouble with his superior, Inspector Muthukaruppan. One day, during a night patrol, Subhash argues with the Chief Minister's son when he refuses to park his car at the checking place, and the Chief Minister's son shows his arrogance before trying to attack Subash. SI Chandran, Subash's supporter, intervenes in the argument and apologises to the Chief Minister's son on Subash's behalf, which enrages Subhash. As a consequence, Subash assaults the Chief Minister's son and his friends at a bar, without leaving any evidence.

Called to investigate a girl's suspected suicide, Subhash deduces that she was murdered and gathers evidence. He confronts Abhijith, a boy whose mobile phone was active near the crime scene, as well as Abhijith's friends, Christy, Bhuvanesh, and Deepak. The boys reveal that they are spoilt brats from affluent families and they had committed the rape and murder of several other girls, avoiding the consequences due to their parents' privilege. Abhijith is the son of a prominent media mogul, Sanjay, while Bhuvanesh is the son of the District Collector Gnanasekharan of Chennai city. Christy is the son of a gold merchant Francis, and Deepak is the son of a scientist. The boys show Subhash a video of them assaulting the girl, and he becomes enraged and arrests them.

Corrupt JCP Saarangan asks Subhash for proof of the crimes, but the videos have been deleted, and the boys are released while Subhash is suspended from duty. The boys vow revenge, and Subhash returns home to discover his extended family has been murdered, except for one niece. Saarangan, who has been bribed with a Porsche Cayenne Car, declares that the deaths resulted from an accidental fire. Subhash resigns, defiantly telling Saarangan that he will avenge his family by ensuring that the four boys die at the hands of their fathers. Bhuvan is kidnapped by Subhash and locked in a car booby trapped with inflammable silane gas. His father opens the car door and witnesses Bhuvan burn alive in front of him.

Subhash then kidnaps Deepak and Christy and hides them. The corrupt police try to detain Subash secretly, but he triggers Muthukaruppan's pistol, which attracts public attention and forces them to arrest him officially. While in custody, Subhash reveals to Christy's father that Christy is in a van at the airport. The father finds Christy and tells him to run to the police for help, but Subhash had placed an illegal firearm in Christy's bag along with a beeping device. The National Security Guards mistake Christy for a terrorist and fatally shoot him. With technical help from Subhash's friend, Deepak's crimes are exposed on the Internet, and a live video feed shows him inside a glass tank.

The public is allowed to release chemicals remotely, which will result in Deepak's death. Deepak's father hires hackers to stop this. Deepak is located, and when his father breaks open the glass to release him, the chemicals are combined and Deepak is killed. In the meantime, Subhash warns Saarangan to check on his teenage daughter's safety. Saarangan panics but is relieved when he finds her to be safe. Saarangan realises his hypocrisy and changes his corrupt mind and decides to support Subhash to fight for justice for the victims of the boys. Abhijit's father, Sanjay, has Subhash released from custody, intending to make a deal.

Subhash kidnaps Abhijit and dangles him from a rope at a great height; he threatens to publicise the recovered video evidence of the boys' crimes, thereby ruining Sanjay and his reputation. Sanjay is given a chance to prevent this by shutting down a computer, but he would have to let go of the rope. Sanjay does so, and lets his son fall to his death to preserve his reputation. One year later, Subhash has now cleared the Civil Services Exam and has become an IPS officer, and continues to murder unconvictable lawbreakers to serve justice.

== Cast ==
- Ravi Mohan as Sub Inspector S. Subash
- Raashii Khanna as Anitha, Subash's fiance (Voice dubbed by Raveena Ravi)
- Babu Antony as Sanjay, Abhijit's father
- Sampath Raj as J. C. P. Saarangan
- Ramdoss as Constable Ramadass
- Ponvannan as Subash's father
- Azhagam Perumal as Sub-inspector Chandran
- Mime Gopi as Inspector Muthukarauppan
- Bharath Raj as Abhijit Sanjay
- Vijay Victor as Deepak
- Raja Rudrakodi as Christy Francis
- Shabeer Kallarakkal as Bhuvanesh (Bhuvan) Gnanasekharan
- Sriranjani as Subash's mother
- Subbu Panchu as Subash's brother
- Meera Vasudevan as Subash's sister-in-law
- Gajaraj as Gnanasekharan IAS Bhuvan's father, Corrupt district collector
- Mathew Varghese as Francis, Christy's father
- Nithin Mehta as Deepak's father, a scientist
- Karthik Thangavel as Chief Minister's son
- Delhi as Anusha
- Dishi as Vinusha
- Muthukumar as Parvathi's father
- Chaams as Drunkard
- Gopi Gpr as Cybercrime Officer
- Aparajitha as Saarangan's daughter
- Sai Tamil as Henchman
- Aathma Patrick as Henchman
- Poorna as Subash's lawyer (guest appearance)
- RJ Sindhu (special appearance in the song "Anangu Vaangu")
- VJ Syed (special appearance in the song "Anangu Vaangu")
- Anand Joy as Subash's Hacker Friend, Anitha's Well-wisher in Bengaluru.

== Production ==
In December 2017, Ravi Mohan announced on social media that his 23rd film would be an action-thriller titled Adanga Maru by first-time director Karthik Thangavel. Filming began the same day. Raashii Khanna was announced as the female lead, this being her second Tamil film after Imaikkaa Nodigal (2018). Stunt choreographer Stun Siva's son, Kevin Kumar, made his debut as a stunt choreographer in this film. Filming was almost completed in May 2018.

== Soundtrack ==
The soundtrack was composed by Sam C. S. The audio rights were acquired by Sony Music in August 2018. The first single "Aangu Vangu" was released on 10 September 2018. The complete album was released on 6 October 2018.

Adanga Maru

Soundtrack album by Sam C. S.
- Released: 2018
- Genre: Tamil
- Length: 17:34
- Language: Tamil
- Label: Sony Music
- Producer: Sam C. S.

Sam C. S. chronology
NOTA (2018)	Adanga Maru (2018)	Ispade Rajavum Idhaya Raniyum (2019)

Track listing
No.	Title	Singers	Length
1.	"Aangu Vaangu"	Sam C. S., Mukesh Mohamed, M. L. R. Karthikeyan	4:26
2.	"Saayaali"	Sathyaprakash Dharmar, Chinmayi	5:15
3.	"Pachai Dhrogangal"	Haricharan	3:46
4.	"Kaar Irul"	Sivam	3:07
Total length:			17:34

== Release and reception ==
Adanga Maru was released on 21 December 2018. Thinkal Menon of The Times of India rated it 3 out of 5, saying, "Adanga Maru has a routine plot, but the treatment makes it fast-paced and interesting." Srinivasan Ramanujam of The Hindu wrote, "thanks to its speedy screenplay, Adanga Maru finishes as a fairly engaging watch." Janani K of India Today wrote, "Debutant director Karthik Thangavel's Adanga Maru starring Jayam Ravi could have been a flawless cop thriller, but it misses the mark by a few inches." Antara Chakraborthy of The Indian Express wrote, "A more nuanced, well thought-out storyline with better CGI could have definitely elevated the revenge saga. Adanga Maru is strictly a one-time watch".
