= Ditya Bhande =

Indian dancer and actress (born 2006)

- Born: 15 November 2006 (age 19); Nala Sopara, Mumbai, Maharashtra, India
- Other name: Khajoor
- Occupations: Dancer; actor
- Parents: Sagar Bhande; Neha Sagar Bhande

Ditya Bhande (born 15 November 2006) is an Indian dancer and actress.

== Career ==
She is the winner of the kids dance reality television show Super Dancer Season 1. She made her acting debut in the Tamil musical film Lakshmi, where she acted as a schoolgirl who loves dance. She is a member of I Am Hip Hop kids crew. She also participated in Dance India Dance Season 7.

== Filmography ==
Key
†	Denotes films that have not yet been released

Year	Title	Role	Language	Notes
2018	Lakshmi	Lakshmi	Tamil	partially reshot in Telugu
2018	Zero	Herself	Hindi	Special appearance in "Mere Naam Tu"

Television
Year	Title	Role	Language	Notes
2016	Super Dancer	Contestant	Hindi	Winner
2019	Dance India Dance: Battle of the Champions	Contestant	Hindi	
2022	Five Six Seven Eight	Semba	Tamil	

== Awards ==
year	Awards	Category	Film/Series	Language	result
2016	Lion Gold Awards	Best Dancer	Super Dancer Season 1	Hindi	Won
2018	Ananda Vikatan Cinema Awards	Best Child Artist	Lakshmi	Tamil	Won
2018	JFW Movie Awards	Best Child Artist	Lakshmi	Tamil	Won
2018	South Indian International Movie Awards	Best Female Debut	Lakshmi	Tamil	Nominated
2018	Edison Awards	Best Child Artist	Lakshmi	Tamil	Nominated
2018	Galatta Debut Awards	Best Debut Child Actor- Female	Lakshmi	Tamil	Won
2018	Norway Tamil Movie Awards	Best Child Artist	Lakshmi	Tamil	Won

- Super Dancer Season 1 title winner
