= Anand Shankar =

Indian film director and screenwriter

- Born: TamilNadu, India
- Occupations: Director, screenwriter
- Years active: 2010 - present
- Spouse: Divyanka Jeevanantham

Anand Shankar is an Indian film director and screenwriter, primarily working in Tamil films. Shankar started his career as an assistant director to Siddharth Anand in Anjaana Anjaani (2010). He also assisted producer-director AR Murugadoss in movies such as Thuppakki and 7 Aum Arivu.

He successfully finished his work as debut director on Arima Nambi starring Vikram Prabhu and Priya Anand, a Tamil thriller film. He directed Iru Mugan and Arima Nambi, both of them became blockbusters at the box-office. In 2018, he directed NOTA, starring Vijay Devarkonda in his Tamil debut. The film was released on October 5, 2018.

== Early life ==
Anand Shankar is the grandson of National Award Winning playwright Komal Swaminathan. Anand Shankar got a mechanical engineering degree in Chennai from Sri Venkateswara College of Engineering (SVCE), after which he studied film at the New York Film Academy.

== Personal life ==
He is married to Divyanka Jeevanantham, an IT professional. The couple has a daughter, Kiara Anand.

== Filmography ==
Director

Year	Film	Notes
2014	Arima Nambi	
2016	Iru Mugan	
2018	NOTA	
2021	Enemy	
2027	Power House	

Actor

Year	Film	Role	Notes
2011	7 Aum Arivu	Music Shop Employee	
