= Kadalai =

2016 Indian film by P. Sagayasuresh

- Poster
- Directed by: P. Sagayasuresh
- Written by: P. Sagayasuresh
- Starring: Ma Ka Pa Anand; Aishwarya Rajesh
- Cinematography: N. Raagav
- Edited by: A. L. Ramesh
- Music by: Sam C. S.
- Production company: Udhayam Entertainment
- Distributed by: Dream Factory
- Release date: 29 October 2016
- Country: India
- Language: Tamil

Kadalai (transl. Flirt lit. 'Peanut') is a 2016 Indian Tamil-language comedy film directed by P. Sagayasuresh, starring Ma Ka Pa Anand and Aishwarya Rajesh. Featuring music composed by Sam C. S., the film began production in early 2015 and was released on 29 October 2016.

== Plot ==
A young man who leads a carefree life realises the importance of agriculture when a businessman tries to acquire farming land in his village to set up a factory.

== Cast ==
- Ma Ka Pa Anand as Manickam
- Aishwarya Rajesh as Kalai
- Ponvannan as Boopathy
- Yogi Babu as Kaali
- John Vijay as Businessman
- Manobala as Swamy
- Yaar Kannan as Ponna
- Raviraj as Principal
- Thavasi as Palani
- Radha
- Seeniammal as Manickam's grandmother
- Seema

Special appearances in the promotional song "Namma Idli Dosa Chapati"

- Venkatesh Harinathan
- RJ Balaji
- Arjun Chidambaram

== Production ==
The film was announced and began shoot during January 2015 under the title of Deepavali Thuppakki, with Ma Ka Pa Anand and Aishwarya Rajesh selected to play the lead roles.

In July 2016, the film went through a name change from Deepavali Thuppakki to Kadalai, after the film felt the latter reflected the film's theme of agriculture better. The director, Suresh, had also considered the title Nel, but felt that the audience may see it as an art film if they had chosen that. The team experienced further title trouble after the makers of another film titled Kadala Poda Oru Ponnu Venum complained to the Producers' Council stating that the titles were too similar.

== Soundtrack ==
The soundtrack was composed by Sam CS.

No.	Title	Singers	Length
1.	"Otha Mazhaiyila"	Hariharan	4:14
2.	"Kannukulla Vanthu"	Sam C. S., Nincy	4:38
3.	"Aayava Kaanom"	Ma Ka Pa Anand	3:52
4.	"Aathankarai"	Sam C. S., Shweta Mohan	4:05
5.	"Ver Varai"	Haricharan	4:28
Total length:			25:17

== Critical reception ==
The Times of India wrote "Had more effort been put into both the making and the writing, the film could have been called a good attempt, especially given the fact that it talks about the need to promote agriculture among youngsters." Sify wrote "Though director Sagaya Suresh's idea of conveying the importance of farming is laudable, he falls short in convince us with an engaging screenplay in the second half."
