= Sattam En Kaiyil (2024 film) =

2024 Indian Tamil language crime thriller film directed by Chachi

- Theatrical release poster
- Directed by: Chachi
- Written by: JM Raja (dialogues)
- Produced by: Bharathwaj Muralikrishnan; Anandhakrishnan Shanmugam; Sriram Sathyanarayanan
- Starring: Sathish; Vidya Pradeep
- Cinematography: PG Muthaiya
- Edited by: Martin Titus A
- Music by: MS Jones Rupert
- Production companies: Shanmugam Creations; Seeds Entertainment
- Distributed by: PVR Pictures
- Release date: 27 September 2024
- Running time: 123 Minutes
- Country: India
- Language: Tamil

Sattam En Kaiyil (transl. The law is in my hands) is a 2024 Indian Tamil-language crime thriller film written and directed by Chachi. The film stars Sathish in the lead role along with an ensemble cast including Ajay Raj, Pavel Navageethan, Mime Gopi, Rithika Tamil Selvi, Vidya Pradeep and others appear in supporting roles.

The film is produced by Bharathwaj Muralikrishnan, Anandhakrishnan Shanmugam of Shanmugam Creations, and Sriram Sathyanarayanan of Seeds Entertainment. The film has music composed by MS Jones Rupert, cinematography handled by PG Muthaiya and editing by Martin Titus A.

Sattam En Kaiyil was released theatrically on 27 September 2024 to positive reviews.

== Plot ==
At Yercaud Police Station, a complainant reports that his pregnant wife had not received proper medical treatment, resulting in a stillbirth. In retaliation, he assaulted the doctor involved. However, a corrupt A.S.I Basha intervenes, brutally beat up the complainant and incarcerated him. The severely injured complainant was later rushed to the hospital.

Gautham, a cab driver who stammers under stress, gets involved in a road accident, striking a motorcyclist. Panicked, he hides the fatally injured biker in his car trunk and flees the scene, leaving behind a crucial piece of evidence – the motorcyclist's slipper. To avoid murder charges, Gautham deliberately gets arrested for drunk driving and slaps Basha to prevent his car from being searched. Basha seizes the vehicle and plots revenge against Gautham by falsely charging him with drug smuggling but his colleagues intervene.

Meanwhile, social activist Nivetha, who provides free education to village children, gets murdered. The S. P. orders the investigation officer S.I Nagaraj to resolve the case promptly and organize an awareness program for the villagers regarding the tragic death of a young girl child that happened earlier. At the police station, upon learning that Gautham slapped Basha, Nagaraj makes Gautham sit on a stool, irritating Basha's ego. Rathinam and his wife arrive at the police station, only to learn that their daughter Nivetha was the victim. Gautham, overwhelmed, hid in the restroom. Basha taunts Nagaraj, questioning his ability to solve the case. Nagaraj retaliates by humiliating Basha by ordering him to serve tea to Gautham. During the investigation, the police analysed the CCTV footage from a nearby petrol pump and identify the biker as Nivetha's killer.

The chain snatched from Nivetha is now with Gautham and he uses it to bribe Constable Sundaram to retrieve the killer-biker's phone and replace it with his own. The police track the bike to Balu and Basha coerces Balu's wife into confessing. Constable Vikas produces the slipper Gautham had missed, and Balu's son identifies it as his father's. Now, the police deduced the hit-and-run occurred at the scene and noted the car's broken headlight as an identifying feature. Upon hearing this via walkie-talkie, Gautham smashes his car's mirrors and headlight. Meanwhile, Basha discovers Gautham's wallet, but Nagaraj suspects Basha is framing Gautham. Gautham fakes epilepsy, injuring his leg to match the blood stains on the floor. Nagaraj orders Gautham's release, but Sundaram demands a ₹25,000 bribe. So, Moorthi sends Gautham to the ATM, where he switches on the retrieved phone, gets tracked, and is easily caught by Nagaraj.

In a private inquiry, Nagaraj gains Gautham's trust and fetches the phone, only to deceive Gautham by framing him as the murderer. It is then revealed that Nagaraj masterminded Nivetha's murder with Balu's assistance. However, Balu's phone containing the incriminating audio clip fell into Basha's hands. Inspector Anand takes charge of producing Gautham in court. At the press meet, Gautham shocks everyone, revealing Nagaraj's involvement in Nivetha's murder and attempting to hand over Nivetha's phone to the press. Nagaraj attempts to seize the phone, but Anand intervenes, arresting both Nagaraj and Gautham. Gautham reveals to Nagaraj that the phone he gave Nagaraj the previous night was his own.

Through flashbacks, it's revealed that Nagaraj was responsible for a hit-and-run accident, killing a young girl who was tutored online by Nivetha. Nagaraj, intoxicated and driving recklessly, had dragged the girl under his jeep, resulting in her death. He threatened her parents, leveraging his police position, but the murder got recorded on Nivetha's phone. Gautham reveals to Nagaraj that he intentionally killed Balu and also sent the incriminating video to Basha.

Gautham's live video to the press accusing Nagaraj goes viral. With no other option, Nagaraj is arrested. Nagaraj claims Gautham killed Balu, but Basha produces the wallet evidence against Nagaraj. Due to lack of evidence, Gautham is released. Finally, it is revealed that Nivetha was Gautham's sister, and he intervened to protect her. The family is overcome with grief, receiving Nivetha's body from the mortuary.

== Cast ==
- Sathish as Gautham
- Ajay Raj as SI Nagaraj
- Pavel Navageethan as ASI Basha
- Mime Gopi as Inspector Anand
- Rithika Tamil Selvi as Nivetha
- Vidya Pradeep as Balu's wife
- Kishore Rajkumar as Kishore
- KPY Sathish as Constable Vikas
- E. Ramdoss as Constable Moorthi
- Bava Chelladurai as Constable Sundaram
- Jeeva Ravi as Rathinam
- Venba as Constable Catherine
- M.S Stalin
- Baby Joyce
- Prem
- Master Shakthi as Balu's son
- Ajay Desai
- Akash Ravichandran
- Salem Ilayaperumal
- Master Ranadheeran
- VJ Adams as Karthi, Cyber-crime staff

== Production ==
On 9 April 2022, actor Sathish's second film in a lead titled Sattam En Kaiyil was announced in the second collaboration with his brother-in-law director Chachi after Sixer (2019). Sathish was last seen in a crime thriller film titled Vithaikkaaran which released earlier this year. The film title was borrowed from Kamal Haasan's 1978 hit film by the same name directed by T. N. Balu. The film was said to be of a crime thriller genre with Sathish playing a completely serious role. The film also features an ensemble cast consisting of Vidya Pradeep, Mime Gopi, Pavel Navageethan, Ajay Raj, Bava Chelladurai, Venba and E. Ramdoss in supporting roles.

Music composer MS Jones Rupert, editor Martin Titus A, cinematographer PG Muthaiya, art director Pasar NK Rahul, and stunt choreographers Ram Kumar and Suresh were chosen for the technical crew and J M Raja for writing the dialogues for the film.

== Music ==
Sattam En Kaiyil

Soundtrack album by M.S. Jones Rupert
- Released: October 9, 2024
- Studio: SoundTown studios. Chennai
- Genre: Feature film soundtrack
- Length: 11:09
- Language: Tamil
- Label: TrendMusic
- Producer: M.S. Jones Rupert

Audio Jukebox
- Sattam En Kayil - Audio Jukebox on YouTube

The soundtrack and background is composed by MS Jones Rupert.

No.	Title	Lyrics	Singer(s)	Length
1.	"Sattam En Kayil Theme Track"	Raghav Krishnan	Arunraja Kamaraj	3:14
2.	"Satham Indri Pirindhu"	Sai Vinayagam	M.S.Jones Rupert	3:48
3.	"Asustado Miedo"	Naveen Bharathi	Deepak Blue	4:07
Total length:				11:09

== Release ==
=== Theatrical ===
Sattam En Kaiyil got released theatrically on 27 September 2024 through PVR Pictures in Tamil Nadu. Initially, the film was scheduled to release on 20 September 2024.

=== Home media ===
Sattam En Kaiyil began streaming on Amazon Prime Video from 31 October 2024, coinciding with Diwali.

=== Marketing ===
The makers released the first six minutes from the film on social media as a glimpse through Ravichandran Ashwin.

== Reception ==
Akshay Kumar of Cinema Express rated the film three out of five stars and wrote that "If you don't mind starving yourself through the first half, Sattam En Kaiyil rewards you with the grand feast that is the second half." Abhinav Subramanian of The Times of India gave 3/5 stars and wrote "It's a simple revenge tale that could have been cleverly woven into the proceedings. The info dump feels like a missed opportunity for some smart storytelling."
