= Palaivana Solai =

Palaivana Solai (lit. 'Desert Oasis' in Tamil) may refer to these Indian films:

- Palaivana Solai (1981 film), directed by Robert–Rajasekar
- Palaivana Solai (2009 film), directed by K. S. Dayalan
