= Penpattanam =

- Directed by: V. M. Vinu
- Screenplay by: T. A. Razak
- Story by: Ranjith
- Produced by: Maha Subair
- Starring: Shwetha Menon; Revathi; KPAC Lalitha; Vishnupriya
- Cinematography: Sanjeev Sankar
- Edited by: P. C. Mohan
- Music by: M. G. Sreekumar; C. Rajamani (background score)
- Release date: 29 July 2010
- Running time: 121 minutes
- Country: India
- Language: Malayalam

Penpattanam is a 2010 Malayalam film by V. M. Vinu. This films takes a look at the struggle for survival of four women who are Kudumbasree workers portrayed by Shwetha Menon, Revathi, KPAC Lalitha and Vishnupriya. This film is based on 2008 Korean film Girl Scout.

== Plot ==
Girija, Suhara, Santha (also known as Santhedatthi), and Raji are four women employed as sanitation workers under the Kudumbashree programme of the Kozhikode Corporation. Each faces financial hardship. Girija is a widow raising two school-aged daughters, while Suhara struggles to support her bedridden husband, whose surgery requires a substantial amount of money. Santhedatthi continues to work despite her old age to provide for her alcoholic son and his family. Raji, an orphan, lives with her sister and brother-in-law, a police officer who disapproves of her relationship with Mani, a plumber with a former criminal background. Girija and Santhedatthi are also indebted to a local moneylender, Unnithan Muthalali.

While on duty, the four women discover ₹3 million abandoned in a waste bin. Although they initially intend to surrender the money to the police, they decide against it because of their financial difficulties. Instead, they entrust the money to Unnithan Muthalali, who promises to invest it and pay them monthly interest.

At the same time, the police discover the body of a hawala operator and determine that the missing money is connected to his murder. Circle Inspector Antony leads the investigation, and the evidence eventually points to the four women. During this period, Raji becomes engaged to Mani. The women are arrested, interrogated, and remanded to a sub-jail, where Raji is assaulted by three inmates before Suhara intervenes and protects her. They are later released on bail with the assistance of advocate Maheswari Iyer.

Subsequently, Girija demands that Unnithan return the money. He refuses and instead attempts to sexually exploit her in exchange for its return. After informing the others, the four women confront Unnithan and successfully recover the money through a carefully planned deception.

Meanwhile, Suhara learns that a charitable organisation has agreed to fund her husband's surgery. Having no further need for the money, the four women return the ₹3 million to the widow of the murdered hawala operator. Although Circle Inspector Antony uncovers the circumstances surrounding the case, he decides not to pursue further action, recognising that the women neither intended to keep the money for personal gain nor profited from it.

== Cast ==
- Shwetha Menon as Suhara
- Revathi as Girija
- KPAC Lalitha as Shantha Edathi
- Vishnupriya as Raji
- Kailash as Hari
- Nedumudi Venu as Unnithan Muthalali
- Lal as CI Antony Das
- Praveena as Adv. Maheshwari Iyer
- Sadiq as Shajudeen
- Abu Salim as ASI Hameed
- Augustine as Qabeer
- Shivaji Guruvayoor as SI Balachandran
- Vijay P. Nair
- Musthafa
- Dinesh
- Sreejith

== Production ==
Actress Shwetha Menon was injured on 20 May 2010 while shooting for Penpattanam at Kozhikode. She was injured on her right arm, hacked accidentally in a scene. Following this injury which resulted in a nerve being cut off, the actress underwent minor surgery.
