= Boat (2024 film) =

2024 Indian survival drama film

- Theatrical release poster
- Directed by: Chimbu Deven
- Written by: Chimbu Deven
- Produced by: Prabha Premkumar; C.Kalaivani; Chimbu Deven
- Starring: Yogi Babu; Gouri G. Kishan
- Cinematography: Madhesh Manickam
- Edited by: Dinesh Ponraj
- Music by: Ghibran
- Production companies: Maali and Maanvi Movie Makers; Chimbudeven Entertainment
- Distributed by: Sakthi Film Factory; Hombale Films
- Release date: 2 August 2024
- Running time: 125 minutes
- Country: India
- Language: Tamil

Boat is a 2024 Indian Tamil-language survival drama film written and directed by Chimbu Deven. The film stars Yogi Babu, and Gouri G. Kishan with M. S. Bhaskar, Chinni Jayanth, Jesse Fox-Allen, Chaams, Jangiri Madhumitha, Shah Ra, Kulappulli Leela, and Aakshath Das in supporting roles.

== Plot ==
Narrative structure
- Chapter 1: "Buckingham Veeranum Paradesiyin Peranum" (transl. Buckingham Soldier and grandson of a wanderer)
- Chapter 2: "Adimai Mandugalum Japan Gundugalum" (transl. Slaves dumb and Japanese bomb)
- Chapter 3: "Irandu Thuduppum Yegapatta Kaduppum" (transl. 2 Oars to travel and a lot of brawl and quarrel)
- Chapter 4: "Mannavan Vanthaanadi Madhi Kettu Ninnaanadi" (transl. The king arrived, dear and stood sense deprived here)
- Chapter 5: "Vazhiyariyaa Puraavum Vanthu Serntha Suraavum" (transl. Dove that lost its way', shark that swam into play')
- Chapter 6: "Maranjathu Karuvadu Minjunathu Thiruvodu" (transl. Dried fish in vain, only Skulls remain)
- Chapter 7: "Asaraadha Eliyum Theeradha Pazhiyum" (transl. A mouse unruffled and a blame unsolved)
- Chapter 8: "Madham Pidicha Yaanai Alariyathu Senai" (transl. Elephant Enraged Army helter-skelter ran scared)
- Chapter 9: "Vettu Onnu Thundu Onbathu" (transl. 1 Strike of the knife 9 heads in strife)
- Chapter 10: "Nandhavanthil Oru Aandi Kundha Idamillaa Bondi" (transl. Tramp in a garden He has no place of his own)

During World War II, Japan, as part of the Axis powers, launched aerial bombing attacks on British-ruled areas of Colombo, Vizag, and Kakkinandhiyavada. Sensing an upcoming threat to Madras province, around 70% of the population flees Madras, while normal life is forced to happen in open camps, which operate once a week. On the night of 11 October 1943, Japanese warplanes bombed the Madras province.

Kumaran, a fisherman from Kasimedu, and his grandmother Muthumaari meet his sister, Alamu, and her fiancé, Rangan, at Santhome shore. Kumaran promises Alamu that their younger brother, Chokkalingam ("Chokku"), will attend her upcoming wedding. Chokku has been arrested on false charges. Kumaran tries to release Chokku by presenting a recommendation letter, but the British officer refuses and warns him that Chokku will be jailed. Eight Japanese warplanes appear above the camp, and an evacuation order is issued. In the chaos, Kumaran, Chokku, and Muthumaari plan to escape by boat to the ocean. They are joined by Raja, a writer from Palakkad; Lal, a money-lender native of Rajasthan; Narayanan, a Brahmin, with his daughter Lakshmi; and Vijaya, a pregnant Telugu woman, with her son Magesh, and Muthaiyya, a retired librarian from Presidency College. As they set off, a fellow accused prevents Chokku from escaping. Unaware of this, Kumaran sets off without him. The police capture Chokku and Muthumaari orders Kumaran to return to shore, but he refuses. The police identify a terrorist suspect named Subbaiyah, who is in the boat, but they proceed forward.

Narayanan becomes frightened upon seeing a rat and asks Kumaran to throw it, but Kumaran refuses. They argue about Brahminism, with Muthaiyya emphasizing that land is equal for all. Raja offers to row the boat, secretly hiding a knife under a bag while doing so. Meanwhile, Muthaiyya reads Kumaran's recommendation letter, which falls into the ocean. Without hesitation, Kumaran jumps into the ocean to retrieve it, but the letter disappears. As the trade winds increase, Narayanan's dhoti is used as a makeshift sailcloth to harness the wind. Meanwhile, Lal creates a small weapon from copper wires and hides it. Later, they suspect a British patrol boat nearby. Irwin Thomas, a British officer, boards the boat and forces Kumaran to continue rowing at gunpoint.

Irwin warns of Japanese submarines seizing British patrol boats, and suggests reaching the high seas. Lal finds a radio in the water and pretends to repair it, while Vijaya secretly scratches the boat to create a hole. Raja reveals his true identity as Raja Mohammed, associated with the Muslim League, sparking an argument with Narayanan. Irwin predicts the Indian subcontinent's bifurcation, but Muthaiyya and Raja affirm their commitment to religious harmony. Four hours later, Irwin spots an approaching Japanese vessel and waves the Imperial Japanese Navy flag, using landing signal officer signals, and the Japanese vessel changes course, assuming their boat is Japanese. Magesh names the rat "Pechi". Irwin insults Kumaran by comparing him to Pechi, forcing Muthaiyya to explain the prevailing caste system. After five hours of rowing, having reached two kilometres beyond the sea limit, the group decides to stay still for the next few hours.

A call from the control room announces that the Japanese bombings are just a rumor and warns that a terrorist is hidden among the group. Due to the boat's overload, a hole forms, and water starts seeping in. Kumaran insists that Irwin, as the last person to board, should jump off. Irwin fights Kumaran and attempts to shoot him, but the bullet misses and creates another hole in the boat. Kumaran firmly states that at least three people must jump off to avoid overload. Shortly after, a huge shark approaches the boat. Seven hours later, with the boat unable to move, the group decides to throw away unwanted items to ease the load, though Muthaiyya refuses to discard the oxygen cylinder. Kumaran warns that standing still will only prolong their survival, but they're running out of water and food. The radio suddenly begins working, playing a MK Thiyagaraja Bhagavathar song. The shark moves closer to the boat, but moves away when the song ends. As hunger sets in, except for Narayanan and Lakshmi, the others consume the dried Malabar kingfish.

Ten hours later, the water begins seeping in again, and a meteorological alert announces an upcoming cyclone in the Bay of Bengal. Kumaran jumps into the water to tie the boat, but his feet get entangled and he is later rescued. Muthaiyya reveals himself as a CID officer and vows to identify the terrorists and throw them off, while the others must decide who will jump next. Muthaiyya asks each person to share their reason for wanting to live and then decide on humanitarian grounds. Everyone pleads their case, except Irwin. Kumaran claims Narayanan's community has enjoyed government perks, while he and his grandmother have no sentimental reason to live and refuse to jump off. As night falls, Muthaiyya suspects Vijaya to be the terrorist, who reveals her son is from her first marriage, and her second marriage was for his medical expenses. Lal performs a puppetry show depicting British looting, enraging Irwin, who slaps him in anger. Vijaya volunteers to jump off, requesting others to care for her son, but Kumaran stops her informing her that the boat will drift southward, as the cyclone has moved toward the east. He fetches tubers to eat, causing dizziness in those who consume them. Lakshmi and Kumaran, who do not eat the tubers, bond closer.

Twenty-eight hours later, a brawl between Kumaran and Raja results in the death of Pechi. Irwin and Narayanan are delighted before discovering two newborn mouse pups, Pechi's offspring. Raja, overcome with guilt and grief, prays for forgiveness. Irwin lures Lal with a commercial space in George Town in exchange for a favour. Magesh hands Irwin's Webley revolver to Muthaiyya, who shoots Irwin's leg and reveals himself as the terrorist. Muthaiyya, the chief commander of the spy team of the Indian National Army, chokes Irwin using varmakalai. Muthaiyya opens the oxygen cylinder, which contains a Japanese war bomb, SD 50, smuggled to India to blast Madras harbor. He plans to throw Irwin into the ocean, but Irwin manipulates Kumaran and Raja against Muthaiyya and stabs him. Magesh throws the revolver into the sea. Lakshmi finds a paper with an escape plan aligned with the Hungarian Vetrovox method written by Muthaiyya. Lal accidentally throws the oxygen cylinder into the water, which opens. Before dying, the heavily wounded Muthaiyya, hands over a photograph of him with Subhas Chandra Bose, Rajan, and Senapathy. They throw Muthaiyya's corpse into the ocean.

Thirty-three hours later, the shark returns after Irwin places a bait to catch fish for food. Kumaran finds a letter from Chokku, warning about Rangan's playboy nature and requesting him to stop the wedding. To return, Kumaran asks two people to jump from the boat. With time running out, and impending dangers around, Irwin plans to manipulate the others to kill Kumaran and Muthumaari. Lakshmi pleads with her father, that planning to kill them without their knowledge is dishonest. Narayanan emotionally consoles Lakshmi, and Irwin asks Raja to kill Kumaran, but Raja refuses, recalling Muthaiyya's words that Irwin would turn them against each other. As sunrise begins, Muthumaari suddenly jumps into the water, saying the mother ocean will protect her and begins to swim. She asks Kumaran to jump, and without hesitation, he follows her into the ocean.

Fourteen days later, the boatmates visit Irwin, to learn the whereabouts of Kumaran and Muthumaari. Now, a reformed Narayanan is seen allowing Lakshmi to pursue music, and he has declined the job at Ripon Building. Lal is returning to Rajasthan, Vijaya has arranged for her son's operation in Bombay, and Raja has met his leader in Calcutta. Magesh finds an embroidered kerchief Lakshmi gifted to Kumaran, revealing that Kumaran is alive and has stopped Alamu's marriage. Irwin interrupts, exonerating Kumaran and Chokku from all charges. He asks Kumaran what he wants in return for saving their lives. Kumaran's response is poignant: he asks Irwin to give back his homeland.

== Cast ==
- Yogi Babu as Kumaran
- Gouri G. Kishan as Lakshmi
- M. S. Bhaskar as Muthaiyya
- Chinni Jayanth as Narayanan, Lakshmi's father
- Jesse Fox-Allen as Irwin Thomas
- Chaams as Lal
- Jangiri Madhumitha as Vijaya
- Shah Ra as Raja Mohammed "Raja"
- Kulappulli Leela as Muthumaari, Kumaran, and Alamu's grandmother
- Aakshath Das as Magesh, Vijaya's son
- Pondy Ravi as an Indian Imperial Police officer
- Crane Manohar as a person in the camp
- Vetrivel Raja as a physician in the camp
- Ramesh Thilak as Rangan, Alamu's fiance (cameo appearance)
- Ayali Abi Nakshathra as Alamu, Kumaran's sister (cameo appearance)
- Sivaji Ganesan as Rajan (photo presence only)
- Kamal Haasan as Senapathy (photo presence only)

== Production ==
In February 2019, it was rumoured that Yogi Babu was replacing Vadivelu in Imsai Arasan 24am Pulikesi. In March 2022, it was announced that Chimbu Deven and Yogi Babu are collaborating on a film where Babu plays the role of a fisherman, and they confirmed it is not Imsai Arasan 24am Pulikesi's script. The title look poster and title of the film were unveiled on 15 July 2023. This is the second Tamil film, following Andha Naal (1954), to be set against the backdrop of the Japanese bombardment of Chennai on 11 October 1943. The script was written by Chimbu Devan during the COVID-19 lockdown, inspired by the Japanese bombing in 1943. The film was shot in the backwaters of Uvari coastal village in Tirunelveli for thirty-three days.

== Soundtrack ==
The soundtrack of the film was composed by Ghibran.

Track listing
No.	Title	Lyrics	Singer(s)	Length
1.	"Soka Naanum Nikkiren"	Gold Devaraj	Sudha Ragunathan	3:32
2.	"Thakida Thadhimi"	Gold Devaraj	Deva	2:40
3.	"Vaada Vaa (Promo song)"	Vamanaa	Gold Devaraj	2:42
Total length:				8:54

== Release ==
=== Theatrical ===
The film was released theatrically on 2 August 2024.

=== Home media ===
The film began streaming on Amazon Prime Video from 1 October 2024.

== Reception ==
Roopa Radhakrishnan of The Times of India gave it two out of five stars and wrote, "If your only goal in watching a film is to admire its imagery and ambition, then Boat might be an appropriate watch for you. But the film fails to establish itself as anything more than that or as a solid survival drama." Avinash Ramachandran of The Indian Express rated the film two out of five stars and wrote that "Boat is filled with so many holes of ‘what-ifs’ and ‘could-haves’ that it has no way to go except down, and unfortunately, it does leaving no survivors."

Bhuvanesh Chandar of The Hindu wrote, "Boat is excessively dialogue-heavy, made worse by the loud score drowning out any space for silence. Chances are you might remember the deafening experience and caricaturish characters more than all the well-intentioned ideas. Chimbudevan seems to have lost the plot by more than 12 nautical miles." Jayabhuvaneshwari B of The New Indian Express rated the film one-and-a-half out of five stars and wrote that "Boat promises a thrilling voyage but instead finds itself adrift in a sea of cliches. The director, as the captain, steers the vessel towards a rocky shore of heavy-handed social commentary, rather than the open sea of human complexity."

Anusha Sundar of OTTplay gave it two out of five stars and wrote, "Boat feels underwhelming and heavy at the same time, simply because the film appears to be stuck in pretty much the same spot it began. With a multi-character arc and a premise that sounds interesting as a one-liner, Boat becomes too dialogue-heavy and has characters that do not keep you invested in the film." A critic from Maalai Malar rated the film two out of five stars.
