= Irumbukkottai Murattu Singam =

2010 film by Chimbu Deven

- Directed by: Chimbu Deven
- Written by: Chimbu Deven
- Produced by: Kalpathi S.Aghoram; Kalpathi S.Ganesh; Kalpathi S.Suresh
- Starring: Raghava Lawrence; Padmapriya; Lakshmi Rai; Sandhya
- Cinematography: Alagappan N.
- Edited by: Raja Mohammad
- Music by: Original songs: G. V. Prakash Kumar; Background Score: Sabesh–Murali
- Production company: AGS Entertainment
- Release date: 7 May 2010
- Running time: 140 minutes
- Country: India
- Language: Tamil

Irumbukkottai Murattu Singam (transl. Brute Lion from Iron fort) is a 2010 Indian Tamil-language Western comedy film directed by Chimbu Deven, starring choreographer-turned-actor Raghava Lawrence in a double role alongside Padmapriya, Lakshmi Rai, and Sandhya, and an ensemble supporting cast including Nassar, Sai Kumar, M. S. Bhaskar, and Senthil. The film is a "western adventure comedy film" based on cowboy stories, which is set in the 19th century, paying homages to many western films. The film's shooting commenced in April 2009 and it was released on 7 May 2010 to mixed reviews. The film comically highlights the current world politics.

== Plot ==
The town of Jayshankarapuram, home of Tamil-speaking cowboys, is ruled by a one-eyed tyrant named Kizhakku Kattai, who rules over other villages as well, and is always surrounded by his assistants: a cowgirl named Pakki and an outlaw named Ulakkai. In order to free their town from Kattai's rule, Bilagiri James, Dagelandi, Jada, and Viruma travel to a neighboring town, Sholaypuram, to seek out a savior.

There, they encounter Singaram, a man with a noble heart who has been sentenced to death for duty negligence. The gang saves Singaram from execution and explains their situation. Singaram learns why he was chosen. The brave Singam was the previous marshal of Jayashankarapuram who bore a striking resemblance to Singaram, and also was the only one who stood up to Kattai's tyranny. Singam disappeared under mysterious circumstances years ago, and the town was left defenseless.

Thus, Singaram is brought to the village and is passed off as Singam. Singaram learns to adapt to his new name, learning all the hero's skills and tricks. He wins the respect of the village seniors, which includes Paandu Paramu and Keluthi Amma. Soon, a girl named Baali falls for Singaram. He later surpasses the original hero's prowess, though initially, it is due to dumb luck. In between the hero's and the villain's camp is a Red Indian village where the tribals are pure vegetarians. With the introduction of this village, the tribal group leader Athirikesa, his father Rangula, and his beautiful daughter Thumbi are also introduced.

The villagers at Jayashankarapuram find a map that is hidden in their "MGR Timesquare", but it is only one half they have. They have to find the other half to hunt for treasure that is preserved and hidden somewhere far away. Unfortunately, Kattai has other plans. He negotiates a deal of freeing prisoners in exchange of the treasure. Singaram and the folks find the treasure in an Indiana Jones-esque adventure. They successfully find the treasure and escape the cave, but it is revealed that Dagelandi is a right-hand man of Kattai, who was spying on Singaram's gang all along. Kattai also reveals that he killed Singam a few years ago and challenges Singaaram to a duel in front of the people. While Kattai gains initially the upper hand, the thought of Singam's death in the hands of Kattai infuriates Singaram, and he starts beating up Kattai. Kattai is eventually shot dead by Pakki, out of her love for Singaram, and she leaves the place with her cronies. Peace prevails within Jayshankarpuram's inhabitants and the red Indians.

Singaram is hailed as a hero in Jayshankarapuram and is presented with a large diamond and a platter of gold coins of the treasure as a reward by the people. However, Singaram declines the gold coins for the diamond, instead asking the people to use the coins to build a school for the children, while stating that education is important and is to be imparted to all. He is given a heartful farewell by the people and rides off. On the way, Baali stops him saying that while he took the diamond, he was leaving his "life" behind. Singaram smiles, and they both ride off in the sunset.

== Cast ==
- Raghava Lawrence in a double role as
  - Singam
  - Singaram
- Padmapriya as Baali
- Lakshmi Rai as Pakki
- Sandhya as Thumbi
- Nassar as Kizhakku Kattai
- Sai Kumar as Ulakkai
- M. S. Bhaskar as Athirikesa
- Senthil as Rangula Peri
- Mouli as Bilagiri James
- Ilavarasu as Dagelandi
- Ramesh Khanna as Jada
- Vaiyapuri as Viruma
- Delhi Ganesh as Paandu Paramu
- Manorama as Keluthi Amma
- Chaams as Lee
- Mohan Raman as Sheriff
- Besant Ravi as Color Kathiresan
- V. S. Raghavan (cameo appearance) as an Old man in Jaishankar Puram

== Production ==
For the role of a cowboy, Raghava Lawrence grew his hair long and learned horse riding and gunspinning.

== Soundtrack ==
The soundtrack was composed by G. V. Prakash Kumar. All lyrics written by Vairamuthu.

Irumbukkottai Murattu Singam

Soundtrack album by G. V. Prakash Kumar
- Released: 2009
- Genre: Feature film soundtrack
- Length: 27:31
- Language: Tamil
- Label: Sony Music South

G. V. Prakash Kumar chronology
Aayirathil Oruvan (2010)	Irumbukkottai Murattu Singam (2009)	Madrasapattinam (2010)

Track listing

No.	Title	Singer(s)	Length
1.	"Velaikkari Nee"	MK Balaji, Ramya NSK, Bhargavi	4:09
2.	"Nenjam Nenjam"	G. V. Prakash Kumar, Harini, Sulabha	4:52
3.	"Ilantamizha"	Tippu	3:12
4.	"War Theme"	Rahul Nambiar	2:23
5.	"Kanna Nee Ennai"	Bombay Jayashri, Naveen Iyer, D.A. Srinivas	4:48
6.	"Raaja Singham"	Rahul Nambiar, Shakthisree Gopalan, Big Nikk	5:15
7.	"Irumbukottai Murattu Singam"	G. V. Prakash Kumar	2:52

== Release and reception ==
Sify wrote "Hats off in cowboy style to writer and director Chimbudevan for doing such good research and bringing about authenticity to his plot and acknowledging great western legendary films of the 60?s and 70?s. But if only he had worked out a better script, it would have been a great fun ride".
