= Hitler (1996 film) =

1996 Indian Malayalam film directed by Siddique

- Directed by: Siddique
- Written by: Siddique
- Produced by: Ousepachan Vaalakuzhy; Lal
- Starring: Mammootty; Mukesh; Shobana
- Cinematography: Anandakuttan
- Edited by: T. R. Shekhar; K. R. Gaurishankar
- Music by: S. P. Venkatesh
- Production companies: Ousepachan Movie House; Lal Creations
- Distributed by: Lal Release
- Release date: 14 April 1996
- Running time: 162 minutes
- Country: India
- Language: Malayalam

Hitler is a 1996 Indian Malayalam-language action comedy film written and directed by Siddique, produced by Ousepachan Valakuzhy and Lal under the banner of Ousepachan Movie House. It stars Mammootty in the title role with Mukesh, Shobana, Sai Kumar, Jagadish, and Vani Viswanath in supporting roles. The story centres around the life of Madhavankutty, locally known as 'Hitler' due to his tough character, domineering personality and his uncontrolled rage at the youngsters of the area, for stalking his five young sisters. The film features original songs composed by S. P. Venkatesh. Hitler became the highest-grossing Malayalam film of the year 1996, and completed more than 300 days of theatrical run. The film broke the collection record of Mammootty-starrer The King that was released the previous year.

== Plot ==
The movie is about the life of Madhavankutty, a rich man known locally as "Hitler" due to his tough character, domineering personality and frequent uncontrolled rage towards the young men of the area for stalking his five younger sisters. Even though he loves his family more than anything in the world, he struggles to show his love for them. He had been looking after the family since the death of their mother. Their father Pillechan married again and has two more daughters. His children from the first marriage do not even speak with him. Madhavankutty's maternal uncle Gangadhara Menon is responsible for the separation between the children and Pillechan, which is revealed in a later part of the story.

Madhavankutty's marriage was arranged with Gangadhara Menon's daughter, Gauri and his sister Ammu's marriage with Gauri's brother Balachandran. Once during Madhavankutty's absence, Balachandran snuck into his house to be with Ammu, but got caught which resulted in hostility between the two families and Madhavankutty to oppose any of the already arranged marriages. Balachandran however, wants to make them happen.

Things change when the eldest sister Seetha is raped by her unmarried professor under the influence of alcohol. On coming back to senses, the professor confesses to Madhavankutty. Devastated on hearing this and learning how this incident can affect the lives of his younger sisters, he is forced to go along with the solution that the professor puts forward. He marries Seetha to the professor. His sister Ammu unaware of the facts behind the marriage is furious with him. In order to hide the facts, he behaves rudely and dominantly with Ammu. Balachandran uses this opportunity to marry Ammu, who otherwise wouldn't do anything against her brother's wishes. Balachandran and Ammu settle in the neighbourhood.

Meanwhile, Madhavankutty's uncle Gangadhara Menon tries to befriend their rival family – Kompara. Waiting for an opportunity to take revenge, they pretend to offer help, while acting to increase the hatred between Madhavankutty and his uncle. They also propose a marriage alliance with Gauri, which Gangadhara Menon approves. Gauri, still in love with Madhavankutty, feigns pregnancy, saying Madhavankutty is the father and foils the proposal. Gangadhara Menon, on the advice of Nandakumar (from the Kompara family), decides to destroy the lives of Madhavankutty's sisters, the way he has ostensibly destroyed Gauri's life. Madhavankutty's father, Pillechan learns about the plot and foils it, but it causes the girls and him to end up in the police station. He fails to convince his first family about the truth and they become angrier with him for his behaviour. Nandakumar takes this opportunity to murder Pillechan.

Madhavankutty, even though angry at his father's deeds, does not desert his half sisters and brings them home, much to the dismay of his sisters who have an argument with him and leave to stay with Ammu. Balachandran realises the seriousness of the situation and asks the girls to go back to their brother. He also say that whatever he did, was for Madhavankutty to stop sacrificing his life for his sisters and to get him married to Gauri who loves him for life. Balachandran goes to find Madhavankutty to apologise, but gets attacked by a gang of thugs under the command of someone, seemingly Madhavankutty, while it actually was Krishnanunni the eldest of Kompara family. Balachandran survives and thinks Madhavankutty did it, which causes everyone, even Gauri to turn against him.

Gangadhara Menon along with the Kompara family go to finish Madhavankutty once and for all, but learns that Balachandran was not attacked by Madhavankutty and he himself is the intended murder victim. The Komparas attack Menon and gravely injure him, but to their surprise Madhavankutty shows up to save Menon. Wounded Menon at the hospital tells the rest of the family about his nephew's innocence. Madhavankutty survives the attack and gets rid of the Kompara family from their lives.

However, losing hope in everything he believes, he decides to leave his family and go away. He does not listen to the apologies or requests of the sisters to stay. He asks Balachandran to take care of the sisters and to find a better person for Gauri as he will never be a good husband for her. He begins to leave while a youngster shows up staring at his sisters leading him to chase the one, indicating that he can't stop being himself and can never leave.

== Cast ==
- Mammootty as Mamangalath Madhavankutty / 'Hitler' Madhavankutty
- Mukesh as Balachandran, Madhavankutty's Cousin
- Shobhana as Gouri, Madhavankutty's Fiancé & Balachandran's Sister
- Jagadish as Hridayabhanu (Balachandran's Friend)
- Innocent as Pillai, Madhavankutty's Father
- Cochin Haneefa as Jabbar, Pillai's Friend and Helper
- Saikumar as Nandakumar
- Ilavarasi as Seethalakshmi, Madhavankutty's First Sister
- Vani Viswanath as Ammu Balachandran, Madhavankutty's Second Sister & Balachandran's Wife
- Suchitra Murali as Gayathri, Madhavankutty's Third sister
- Chippy as Thulasi, Madhavankutty's Fourth Sister and Hridayabhanu's Lover
- Seetha as Ambili, Madhavankutty's Fifth Sister
- Seena Antony as Sandhya, Madhavankutty's Half Sister
- Manju Thomas as Sindhu, Madhavankutty's Half Sister
- M.G. Soman as College Professor, Seetha's Husband
- Idavela Babu as Chandru
- Kozhikode Narayanan Nair as Mamangalath Gangadhara Menon, Balachandran and Gouri's Father
- Zainuddin as Sathyapalan, Madhavankutty's House Caretaker
- Kalabhavan Rahman as Sulaiman
- V. K. Sreeraman as Krishnan Unni
- Mohan Raj as Devarajan
- K. P. A. C. Lalitha as Balachandran and Gouri's Mother
- Adoor Bhavani as Sathyapalan's Mother
- Kanakalatha as Nandakumar's Sister-in-Law
- Zeenath as Chandru's Mother
- T. P. Radhamani
- Usharani as Dance Teacher Malathi
- Vineeth as Youngster (Cameo)

== Release ==
The film was released on 14 April 1996.

== Box office ==
The film was a commercial success. The film was the highest grossing Malayalam film at that time. The film ran 300 days in theatres.

== Soundtrack ==
All lyrics are written by Gireesh Puthenchery; all music is composed by S. P. Venkatesh.

| No. | Title | Artist(s) | Length |
|---|---|---|---|
| 1. | "Kithachethum Kaatte" | K. S. Chithra, M. G. Sreekumar |
| 2. | "Maarivil Poonkuyile" | B. Arundhathi |
| 3. | "Nee Urangiyo" | K. J. Yesudas |
| 4. | "Neeyurangiyo Nilave" (Female) | K. S. Chithra |
| 5. | "Sundarimaare Ketti" | Sebastian, Boney |
| 6. | "Vaarthinkale" (Female) | K. S. Chithra |
| 7. | "Vaarthinkale" (Male) | K. J. Yesudas |

== Remakes ==
The film was remade in Telugu under Hitler (1997), in Hindi as Krodh (2000), in Tamil as Military (2003) in Bengali as Dadar Adesh (2005), and in Kannada as Varsha (2005).
