= Pon Megalai =

- Directed by: Sakthi Chithran
- Written by: Sakthi Chithran
- Produced by: Jayaparvathi Ganesan
- Starring: Nithya Das; Abhinay; Charan Raj
- Cinematography: K. V. Suresh
- Edited by: Peter Pappiah
- Music by: Ilaiyaraaja
- Production company: Jayaparvathi Films
- Release date: 24 June 2005
- Running time: 115 minutes
- Country: India
- Language: Tamil

Pon Megalai is a 2005 Indian Tamil language thriller film directed by Sakthi Chithran. The film stars Nithya Das, Abhinay and Charan Raj, with Charuhasan, Vijayan, T. S. Raghavendra, Naga Kannan, Anu Mohan, Anusha Raghavendra and Sona Heiden playing supporting roles. It was released in 2005.

== Plot ==
The film begins with the news reporter Malarvannan finding the bloodied and unconscious body of Megalai in a nun's dress near a railway track. Malarvannan and a local police inspector then visit the nearby church and ask the church father to identify her at the hospital. At the hospital, the church father is shocked to see Megalai, as well as the minister Thandavarayan and the police inspector Gajapathi.

In the past, Megalai lived happily with her father Ramanathan and her little sister Sangeetha. After her father's death, Megalai had the duty of looking after her sister and finding a job. She ought her father's government job, but the officer demanded sexual favors from her in return for the job, and she refused. Megalai went to the beach to clear up her mind and stayed there the whole day. As night fell, some drunk men tried to misbehave with her, and Gajapathi drove them out and took her to the police station. There, Megalai came to know that Gajapathi had raped a lady constable. Gajapathi beat up the journalist who took the video of his rape and left the videocassette on his table, Megalai took it and ran away from the place. During the run, Megalai was hit by Thandavarayan's car, and Thandavarayan took the unconscious Megalai at his home. When Megalai woke up, she listened to Thandavarayan's plan of putting a bomb in a hospital. She managed to escape from the place and Thandavarayan's goons, and she beat up a pervert who tried to rape her. She then entered a church and begged the church father to help her, and he suggested her to stay in his home. However, the church father turned out to be a fraud and tried to rape Megalai; during the clash, she was injured in the head and fainted.

After she awakes in the hospital, Megalai tells all the events to the police inspector Soundarapandian, and he vows to put the culprit in jail. The next day, Malarvannan finds the videocassette and gives it to Soundarapandian. Meanwhile, Gajapathi sneaks into the hospital to kill Megalai, while two terrorists appointed by Thandavarayan try to put a bomb in the hospital. Soundarapandian manages to save Megalai by killing Gajapathi. Following a bomb alert, the patients and the medical staff try to leave the place, but the bomb exploded, killing more than 200 people. The following day, Thandavarayan commits suicide, whereas the church father dies after being electrocuted. The film ends with Soundarapandian congratulating Megalai for her braveness and Megalai finally finding a government job.

== Cast ==
- Nithya Das as Megalai
- Abhinay as Malarvannan
- Charan Raj as Soundarapandian
- Charuhasan as Ramanathan
- Vijayan
- T. S. Raghavendra as Minister Thandavarayan
- Naga Kannan as Gajapathi
- Anu Mohan as Head Constable
- Anusha Raghavendra as Sangeetha
- Sona Heiden as Uma
- Pandu as Thief
- Kanakadurga
- Kottai Perumal as Constable Perumal
- Manager Cheena as Kailasam
- Harish Ori as Police inspector
- Sathyajith
- Nirmal
- Karvannan as Church father
- S. V. Thangaraj as Singer
- Robert in a special appearance

== Production ==
Malayalam film actress Nithya Das was selected to play the lead role thus making her acting debut in Tamil cinema.

== Soundtrack ==
The film score and the soundtrack were composed by Ilaiyaraaja. The soundtrack features 5 tracks.

Tracklist
No.	Title	Lyrics	Singer(s)	Length
1.	"Aalapanai"	Palani Bharathi	Sadhana Sargam, Bhavatharini	4:58
2.	"Aadum Patham"	Muthulingam	Sudha Ragunathan	3:32
3.	"Unnai Thedum"	Mu. Metha	Bombay Jayashri	4:57
4.	"Veena Vaani"	Muthulingam	Kalpana Raghavendar, Prasanna	4:02
5.	"Seamaiyilea"	Kamakodiyan	Pushpavanam Kuppusamy, Anitha Kuppusamy	4:04
Total length:				21:33

== Reception ==
Malini Mannath wrote, "Music is credited to Ilayaraja, but we hardly find the maestro's touch here [..] It's upcoming Malayalam actress Nithya Das' debut Tamil film. But like the rest of the cast, she hardly gets a chance to prove her mettle" and concluded, "the film has a lyrical title and that too a chaste Tamil one. But start viewing the film and you'll realise soon enough that the film is a far cry from the impression its title conveys".
