= Mustafa Mustafa (film) =

- Theatrical release poster
- Directed by: Praveen Saravanan
- Produced by: Pradeep Mahadevan
- Starring: Sathish; Suresh Ravi; Monica Chinnakotla; Maanasa Choudhary
- Cinematography: K. S. Vishnushri
- Edited by: Dinesh Ponraj
- Music by: M. S. Jones Rupert
- Production company: The Mapogos Company
- Release date: 6 March 2026
- Running time: 108 minutes
- Country: India
- Language: Tamil

Mustafa Mustafa is a 2026 Indian Tamil-language buddy comedy film directed by Praveen Saravanan in his debut. The film stars Sathish, Suresh Ravi, Monica Chinnakotla and Maanasa Choudhary. It was released on 6 March 2026, and was not a box office success.

== Plot ==
Karthik and Vasu are best friends since childhood. The film begins with Vasu going to a wineshop, only to find liquor is out of stock. Vasu then spots a group of girls in the wine shop and finds out that they have bought all the beer stock. He negotiates with them by paying money in exchange for a beer. While asking for a second beer, the girls group refuse. However, Vasu lures them telling he has got something interesting to tell them. He sits with them and starts narrating about how his best friend Karthik's marriage got cancelled due to his scandal video getting viral. The girls become curious and starts hearing vasu's narration.

Karthik has the ambition of entering Tamil cinema and becoming a big hero. Karthik is working as VJ together with Vasu in a local TV channel without much reach. Karthik falls in love with a doctor named Stephie while hosting Stephie as a guest in one of his shows. He tells many lies and eventually makes Stephie fall in love with him, whereas Vasu gets attracted towards Stephie's friend Jeni. Karthik and Stephie's marriage eventually get fixed; however they get into trouble when they find a video of Karthik getting intimate with a girl named honey is leaked and the video starts getting viral.

Meanwhile, John who is a cousin of Stephie loves her one sided from his childhood but gets heartbroken on knowing about the love between Karthik and Stephie. He too watches a glimpse of the leaked video and is hellbent on revenge by stopping the marriage. Whether Karthik and Vasu successfully overcome all the odds and whether he actually married Stephie forms the rest of the story.

== Cast ==
- Sathish as Karthik
- Suresh Ravi as Vasu
- Monica Chinnakotla as Stephie
- Maanasa Choudhary as Jeni
- Livingston as Karthik's father
- Aishwarya Dutta as Honey
- Java Sundaresan
- Karunakaran as Chitti
- Pugazh as John
- Pavel Navageethan as Kabir Singh
- VJ Parvathy
- VJ Maheswari
- Chanakyan
- Uma Padmanabhan as Karthik's mother

== Production ==
In May 2022, it was announced that Sathish and Suresh Ravi would star in an untitled "friendship comedy" to be directed by Praveen Saravanan in his debut. Praveen added that it was also a "dark comedy, on the lines of" Soodhu Kavvum (2013). In September 2023, the title was announced as Mustafa Mustafa, derived from a song from Kadhal Desam (1996).

== Soundtrack ==
The music was composed by M. S. Jones Rupert. The first single "Thara Thara" was released on 29 November 2025. The second single "Haffa Haffa" was released on 24 February 2026. The third and final single "Sir Ah Paaru Thaaru Maaru" was released on 5 March 2026.

Track listing
No.	Title	Lyrics	Singer(s)	Length
1.	"Thara Thara"	Naveen Bharathi	G. V. Prakash Kumar	3:34
2.	"Haffa Haffa"	Naveen Bharathi	Vaisagh	2:24
3.	"Sir Ah Paaru Thaaru Maaru"	Naveen Bharathi	Anthony Daasan, Deepthi Suresh, Shenbagaraj Ganesalingam	4:19
Total length:				10:17

== Reception ==
Abhinav Subramanian of The Times of India wrote, "Director Praveen Saravanan keeps things moving at a reasonable pace, which at least means the film doesn't overstay its welcome at just under two hours". Akshay Kumar of Cinema Express wrote, "Mustafa Mustafa is a frustrating watch. What makes it so is the squandering of a good premise with a horribly careless screenplay".
