= Suresh Ravi =

Indian actor and television presenter

- Born: Chennai, India
- Occupations: Producer, actor, video jockey
- Years active: 2016–present

Suresh Ravi is an Indian video jockey turned film actor who has mainly appeared in Tamil films. He was associated with various shows as an anchor in Sun Music channel.

== Career ==
Suresh Ravi worked as a video jockey in Sun Music. He made his debut with the horror comedy film Mo (2016). He then starred in the thriller film Kavalthurai Ungal Nanban (2020), which released to positive reviews. In 2023, he starred in lead role in Nandhi Varman. In 2026, he was seen in the comedy film Mustafa Mustafa.

== Filmography ==
Year	Film	Role	Notes	Ref
2016	Mo	Dev		
2020	Kavalthurai Ungal Nanban	Prabhu		
2023	Nandhi Varman	Guru Varman		
2026	Mustafa Mustafa	Vasu		
