= Vithaikkaaran =

- Theatrical release poster
- Directed by: Venki
- Written by: Venki
- Screenplay by: Venki
- Story by: Venki
- Produced by: K. Vijay Pandi
- Starring: Sathish
- Cinematography: Yuva Karthick
- Edited by: Arul Elango Siddharth
- Music by: VBR
- Production company: White Carpet Films
- Release date: 23 February 2024
- Country: India
- Language: Tamil
- Budget: 1.5 Crores
- Box office: 6 Crores

Vithaikkaaran (transl. Magician) is a 2024 Indian Tamil-language crime thriller film directed by Venki and starring Sathish. The film was released on 23 February 2024 and opened to mixed reviews.

== Plot ==
The story revolves around a sharp-witted man called Vetri, who believes that cheating is not wrong but what is actually wrong is getting cheated. Vetri has a twin brother Shakthi who has the exact opposite view.

== Cast ==
- Sathish as Vetri & Shakthi (dual role)
- Simran Gupta as Sithara
- Anandaraj as Dollar Azhagu
- Madhusudhan Rao as Kalkandu Ravi
- Subramaniam Siva as Mari Gold
- G. Marimuthu as Marimuthu
- John Vijay as Inspector Dharmaraj
- MD Asif as Ranjeeth Singh
- Chaams as Marthandam
- Swaminathan as Dr. Paul Walker
- Pavel Navageethan as Tyson
- Japan Kumar as Lee
- Vikram as Arun
- Dharani as Janani
- Ragu Aditya as Tom Mathew
- Hema as Sithara's friend
- Amar Chappa as Lalchand
- Ashok Pandian as Doctor
- Abilash as junior Anand raj

== Production ==
Sathish plays a dual role in the film. The film marks the Tamil lead debut of Simran Gupta, who previously worked as a dancer in the song "Simtagaaran" in Sarkar (2018), and the feature film debut of cinematographer Yuva Karthick. One of the film's schedules was shot in Coimbatore.

== Soundtrack ==
Vithaikkaaran

Soundtrack album by VBR
- Released: 2024
- Genre: Feature film soundtrack
- Length: 12:56
- Language: Tamil
- Label: Think Music
External audio
- Vithaikkaaran – Jukebox on YouTube

The film has music composed by VBR.

Track listing
No.	Title	Lyrics	Singer(s)	Length
1.	"Life Is Magic"	Vairamuthu	Naresh Iyer	3:12
2.	"Sunamika"	Vairamuthu	Hariharan	4:05
3.	"Sunamika (Sad Version)"	Vairamuthu	Nikhil Prabha	2:26
4.	"Who Am I"	Blaaze	Blaaze	3:13
Total length:				12:56

== Reception ==
A critic from The Times of India rated the film 2 1/2 out of 5 and wrote that "Vithaikkaaran is a film that works best when the comedy and drama elements are intertwined. The film does have a few serious elements which are really entertaining, but still, these portions don't work as well as its dark comedy moments and meta-jokes". A critic from Cinema Express rated the film two out of five stars and wrote that "Sathish’s restrained performance as Vetri isn’t enough to save this act that is bland and lacks a punch to hold its audience’s attention span. I often found myself drifting away with the convoluted screenplay in the second half that tries to add humour, wittiness and action in scenes that are already all over the place".

== Home media ==
In March 2024, the film was made available to watch on Simply South and Amazon Prime Video.
