= Karthik Anitha =

- Directed by: Srihari
- Written by: Srihari
- Produced by: Shankar V. Raajhan
- Starring: Rathan Trivikrama; Manju
- Cinematography: K. G. Shankar
- Edited by: P. Sai Suresh
- Music by: Jack Anand
- Production company: King Magic
- Release date: 10 April 2009
- Running time: 125 minutes
- Country: India
- Language: Tamil

Karthik Anitha is a 2009 Indian Tamil language romance film directed by Srihari. The film stars newcomers Rathan Trivikrama and Manju, with Kota Srinivasa Rao, Rajan P. Dev, Abhinay, Bala, Vishnu, Nihal, Singamuthu, Crane Manohar and Lollu Sabha Manohar playing supporting roles. The film, produced by Shankar V. Raajhan, was released on 10 April 2009.

== Plot ==
Karthik lives with his widower father Ramachandramoorthy who spoils him since the death of his mother. Anitha is his neighbour who lives with her parents and little sister in the neighbouring house in the same apartments. Karthik and Anitha are childhood friends and even study at the same college, moreover, their fathers Ramachandramoorthy and Krishnamoorthy are like brothers. However, Karthik and Anitha are constantly squabbling like children and playing pranks on each other. But one day, a prank went wrong and Karthik gets suspended from college thus he starts hating Anitha.

Thereafter, Anitha's wedding is fixed with the wealthy engineer Gowri Shankar and Ramachandramoorthy was the one who made both families agree. It was only then that Anitha realises her love for Karthik. Anitha then briefs Karthik about her wedding and expected him to declare his love for her, Karthik, for its part, manifested his happiness making fun of her.

Karthik then realises his love for Anitha and tries to apologise to her but she keeps ignoring him. He even wrote "Karthik loves Anitha" on a ten rupee note that she had gifted him once for his birthday. When his father finds the currency note one night, he felt guilty at not being able to understand his son's feelings and the next morning, Karthik finds his father dead with the note in his hand. Anitha's family asks Karthik, who was consumed and distressed by the death of his father, to move in with them for a few days. At her home, he is still unable to express his love. Karthik finds a job in Bangalore and has to leave them just a few days before Anitha's wedding, thus he will miss Anitha's marriage. After he left, Anitha finds the currency note and starts to tear up. After thinking for a while, Krishnamoorthy cancels the wedding for the good of his daughter and wants Karthik to be his son-in-law. The film ends with Karthik and Anitha romancing via mobile phones and they are looking forward to their wedding.

== Cast ==
- Rathan Trivikrama as Karthik
- Manju as Anitha
- Kota Srinivasa Rao as Ramachandramoorthy, Karthik's father
- Rajan P. Dev as Krishnamoorthy, Anitha's father
- Abhinay as Gowri Shankar (guest appearance)
- Bala as Bala
- Vishnu as Kumar
- Nihal as Ganesh
- Singamuthu as Maths teacher
- Crane Manohar as Beggar
- Lollu Sabha Manohar as Pappu
- R. Sekar as Rajasekhar, Gowri Shankar's father
- Sathyapriya as Gowri Shankar's mother
- Raviraj as College Principal
- Arulmani as Auto-driver
- Sampath Ram
- Siva Narayana Murthy
- Boys Rajan as College Principal
- Mangalam Gurukkal
- Aarthi as TV Anchor
- Srilatha as Anitha's mother
- Suchithra as Kavi, Anitha's sister
- Sailaja

== Production ==
Srihari, who was earlier working along with Sundar C, made his directorial debut with this venture. The film, produced under the banner of King Magic, had a totally urban setting and is tagged 'a neighbourhood love-story'. Rathan Trivikrama, a debutant and the son of makeup man Babu, signed to play the hero of the film while Manju, hailing from Kerala, was selected to play the heroine. Kota Srinivasa Rao, known for his villain roles, signed to play the father's role.

== Soundtrack ==
Karthik Anitha

Soundtrack album by Jack Anand
- Released: 2 April 2009
- Recorded: 2009
- Genre: Feature film soundtrack
- Length: 24:04
- Producer: Jack Anand

The film score and the soundtrack were composed by Jack Anand. The soundtrack, released in 2 April 2009, features 6 tracks with lyrics written by Thamarai, Na. Muthukumar, Yugabharathi and Srinivas. A critic rated the album 2 out of 5 and stated, "This music director should be appreciated for his jaunty spontaneous touches in music interludes".

Track	Song	Singer(s)	Duration
1	"Thada Thada"	Karthik, Kalyani	4:36
2	"Megamaai"	Bellie Raj, Sangeetha	4:38
3	"Kaadhal Salai"	Haricharan	4:12
4	"Ayyayyayo"	Tippu, Manikka Vinayagam	3:41
5	"Anchu Viralaivichan"	Harish Raghavendra	5:10
6	"Jack Unplugged"	Jack Anand	1:47

== Release ==
The film was originally planned to release in February 2009 but was postponed to 10 April 2009.

=== Critical reception ===
Sify said, "there is nothing new in the age-old squabbling friends turning lovers plot [...] Karthik Anitha is a refreshingly narrated love story. With no lewd dialogues, item songs or vulgarity it makes for a good, clean film for family viewing". A reviewer rated the film 2.5 out of 5 and stated, "Youth entertainer, can be watched once". Indiaglitz wrote, "The pacy narration without any lag makes the movie interesting. Lending good support to the script are five catchy songs tuned by Jack Anand. K G Shankar and A Velmurugan does a neat job behind the camera" and concluded with, "Karthik Anitha is a good, clean entertainer sure to entertain youngsters". Behindwoods.com rated the film 0.5 out of 5 and wrote, "Kaartic Anithaa is a rerun of an often repeated theme of love that is unexpressed. A loose and predictable screenplay by the director Sri Hari is the major pitfall of this movie" A critic from Chennai Online wrote that "The movie has all the ingredients to become a good experience on screen but the lack of style and excitement make the movie an average one".

=== Box office ===
The film took an average opening at the Chennai box office.
