= Vishnupriya (actress) =

Indian actress

- Born: Vishnupriya Ramchandran Pillai; Bahrain
- Citizenship: India
- Occupations: Actress; dancer; model
- Years active: 2007- 2019
- Spouse: Vinay Vijayan (m. 2019)

Vishnupriya Ramchandran Pillai (born in Bahrain), known mononymously and better as Vishnupriya, is an Indian actress, dancer and model. She started off her career participating in the dance reality show Vodafone Thakadimi which was aired on Asianet. She made her acting debut in 2007 with Speed Track, playing a supporting character. Later, she played the lead character in Keralotsavam 2009 and got noticed for her character in Penpattanam (2010). Since then, she has played supporting roles in various films. She made her Tamil cinema debut in Naanga (2011). She had performed for AMMA show in 2013. She has also participated in a reality show Star Challenge on Flowers TV. In 2019, she starred in a Tamil film, V1 with Ram Arun Castro. In a review of the film, one critic noted that "Arun Castro and Vishnu Priya adapt themselves well and shine in the given characters" while another stated that "Ram Arun and Vishnupriya are apt in their respective roles".

== Early life ==
Vishnupriya was born and brought up at Bahrain. She had done her schooling from The Indian School, Bahrain and completed her BBA degree from The Birla Institute of Technology International Centre. She had participated in various competitions and won the Inter-school championship for Bharata Natyam during her school days.

== Filmography ==
Acting

Year	Film	Role	Language	Notes
2007	Speed Track	Smitha	Malayalam	
2007	Rathri Mazha	Meera's friend	Malayalam	
2009	Keralotsavam 2009	Ganga	Malayalam	
2010	Penpattanam	Raji	Malayalam	
2011	Makaramanju	Singer	Malayalam	Cameo in a song
2011	Naanga	Devi	Tamil	
2012	Crime Story	Meera	Malayalam	
2012	Naughty Professor	Herself	Malayalam	Cameo in a song
2012	Puthumugangal Thevai		Tamil	
2012	Banking Hours 10 to 4	Pooja	Malayalam	
2013	Proprietors: Kammath & Kammath	Thirumeni's daughter	Malayalam	
2013	Lisammayude Veedu	Cameo in song	Malayalam	
2013	Police Mamman	Anjana	Malayalam	
2014	God's Own Country	Lekha	Malayalam	
2016	Kadhantharam	Sivani	Malayalam	
2019	Chila New Gen Naattu Visheshangal	Gayathri	Malayalam	
2019	V1	Luna	Tamil	

== Television ==
Year	Program	Channel	Role	Notes
2008	Vodafone Thakadhimi	Asianet	Contestant	
	Sarigama	Asianet	Participant	
2011	Taste of Kerala	Amrita TV	Celebrity Presenter	Cookery show
2012	Super Dancer Junior	Amrita TV	Celebrity Judge	
2013	Sundari Neeyum Sundaran Njanum	Asianet	Dancer	Grand finale
2014	Aarppo Eerro	Kairali TV	Judge	replacing Shamna Kasim
2015	Star Challenge	Flowers TV	Participant	
2015	Smart Show	Flowers TV	Contestant	
2015	Asianet Comedy Awards	Asianet	Herself	
2015	Onnum Onnum Moonu	Mazhavil Manorama	Guest	
2017	Suvarna Hariharam	Mazhavil Manorama	Dancer	
2018-2019	Dance Kerala Dance	Zee Keralam	Mentor	
2019	Ayyappa Saranam	Amrita TV	Goddess Parvathi	TV Serial
2019	Kerala Dance League	Amrita TV	Team Captain	

== Advertisements ==
- Friend and Guide
- Southern Jewellery
- Speak for India (Federal Bank)
- Welgate Properties
