= Cocktail (2020 film) =

2020 Tamil comedy film

- Poster
- Directed by: Ra.Vijaya Murugan
- Produced by: P. G. Muthiah; M Deepa
- Starring: Yogi Babu; Niviksha Naidu; Mithun Maheswaran; Pugazh; KPY Bala; Kawin
- Cinematography: R. J. Raveen
- Edited by: S.N. Fazil
- Music by: Sai Bhaskar
- Production company: P G Media Works
- Distributed by: ZEE5; Tentkotta (Outside India)
- Release date: 10 July 2020
- Running time: 132 minutes
- Country: India
- Language: Tamil

Cocktail is a 2020 Indian Tamil-language comedy film directed by debutante Ra.Vijaya Murugan, and starring Yogi Babu, Niviksha Naidu, Mithun Maheswaran, Pugazh, KPY Bala and Kawin. The film was released on 10 July 2020.

== Synopsis ==
A story about a missing idol that was made by the Chola kings 450 years ago.

== Cast ==
- Yogi Babu as Don
- Niviksha Naidu as Ammu
- Mithun Maheswaran as Anbu
- KPY Bala as Pandi
- Pugazh as Local
- Kawin as Age
- Meghana Ellen as Tamizheni
- Sayaji Shinde as Rajamanickam
- Mime Gopi as JP, gang leader
- Mohamed Kuraishi as Ganesh, JP's assistant
- Swaminathan as the flat secretary
- Bava Lakshmanan as a security guard
- Supergood Subramani as a police officer
- Saravana Sakthi

== Release ==
The film was initially scheduled to have a theatrical release in March 2020, but due to the COVID-19 pandemic, the makers opted for an OTT release directly on ZEE5 on 10 July 2020. The film features a cockatoo in an important role and is the first Indian film to feature the bird.

== Music ==
The songs are composed by Sai Bhaskar.

No.	Title	Lyrics	Singer(s)	Length
1.	"Sajanalobia"	Gana Joe Papa, Sai Bhaskar	Gaana Joe Papa, Gana Guna, Udhay Kannan	3:19
2.	"Cocktail Party"	Sai Bhaskar	Paul Prakash	3:30
3.	"Kambakara Machaney"	Sai Bhaskar	Gana Balachander, Sugandh Shekar, Sai Bhaskar	3:10
4.	"Pride Of Vetri Vel Murugan (Theme)"		Sai Bhaskar	1:47
Total length:				11:46

== Critical reception ==
The Hindu stated "The film’s core plot is ripped from ‘The Hangover’ films, but the prudent way it has been shot could be a guide to filmmakers preparing to work under COVID-19 restrictions." The New Indian Express stated "It’s a compliment to films like Cocktail when they get reviewed, when we offer evidence that we have indeed subjected ourselves to their torment."
