= V1 (film) =

2019 Tamil film

- Release poster
- Directed by: Pavel Navageethan
- Written by: Pavel Navageethan
- Produced by: Arvind Dharmaraj; N A Ramu; Sarvanan Ponraj
- Starring: Ram Arun Castro; Vishnupriya Pillai
- Cinematography: Krishnasekar T.S
- Edited by: C.S. Prem Kumar
- Music by: Ronnie Raphel
- Distributed by: Positive Print Studios
- Release date: 27 December 2019
- Running time: 114 minutes
- Country: India
- Language: Tamil

V1, also known as V1 Murder Case, is a 2019 Tamil suspense thriller film directed by Pavel Navageethan in his directorial debut. The film stars Ram Arun Castro and Vishnupriya Pillai. The film was released on 27 December 2019.

== Plot ==
The movie follows Inspector Agni (Ram Arun Castro), a forensic expert who is undergoing treatment for nyctophobia and is suffering from hallucinations about a past murder. His colleague, Inspector Luna (Vishnupriya Pillai), convinces him to take the case of a recently murdered young woman. The duo interrogate the victim's boyfriend Inba (Lijeesh), who admits that he and Narmadha (Gayathri) had been going through a rough patch while living together. Agni is convinced that someone else is involved in the crime and interrogates the victim’s friend as well as a man who was in touch with her just before her murder. Inba is then found dead at his residence with a suicide note, although the team observes someone fleeing the scene.

The reason for Agni's nyctophobia is shown in a flashback. Agni was living with his wife Blessie. One day, Agni finds Blessie dead near the staircase and chases the person at the scene who dies by accident during the chase. To Agni's shock, it is revealed that Blessie had accidentally fallen while holding a gun. Agni realizes that Blessie's death was an accident and his incorrect intuition led to the death of an innocent man. Drowned by his guilt, Agni takes in the dead man's only daughter Sam and puts her in an orphanage.

After discovering Agni's nyctophobia, his boss forces Agni to resign, but he vows to find the culprit before leaving his position. In the course of his investigation, Sam is trapped with a paedophile who was a suspect in Narmadha's case. Agni saves Sam and kills the suspect, thus overcoming his phobia. Despite all indications, Agni continues interrogations and sets his eyes on Narmadha's father. Finally, he discovers that Narmadha's father killed her by stabbing her neck with a pen as revenge for her relationship with a lower-caste man. Following the arrest of her father, Agni rejoins the force and brings Sam to live with him.

== Cast ==
- Ram Arun Castro as Agni, Forensic Officer
- Vishnupriya Pillai as Luna
- Gayathri as Narmadha
- Lijeesh as Inba
- Mime Gopi as Chain snatcher's father
- Linga as Sidharthan
- Ramachandran Durairaj as Agni's assistant
- Eashvar Karthic as Avinashi
- Mona Bedre as Sakhi

== Production ==
Director and scriptwriter Navageethan struggled to finance the picture. He finally found a producer after film editor Prem Kumar told the story to 100 producers. Ram Arun Castro and Malayalam actress Vishnupriya Pillai were signed to play the lead roles.

== Release and reception ==
The film released to mixed reviews. The Times of India gave the film two out of five stars praising the lack of songs, performances of Castro and Vishnupriya, and the engaging first half, but criticized the second half of the film as it lacked the important elements of a thriller. Sify praised the intriguing beginning, but criticized the screenplay and forced climax. The Hindu praised the scene where each character recounts the events in different ways but criticized the screenplay and the unreliability of certain scenes. Deccan Chronicle said that the film is "enjoyable in parts" and criticized the film's climax and the murderer's reason for killing. On the other hand, the Deccan Chronicle praised the performances of Castro and Vishnupriya, the screenplay, and the cinematography. Indian Express wrote "Though the reason in V1 does have its shock value, it suffers from miserable staging". Silverscreen wrote "Debutant Pavel’s bullet strikes but loses its momentum half-way through while attempting to justify the genre".
