= Maria (2025 film) =

2025 Indian Tamil-language film

- Theatrical release poster
- Directed by: Hari K Sudhan
- Written by: Hari K Sudhan
- Produced by: Hari K Harasudhan
- Starring: Saishri Prabhakaran; Pavel Navageethan; Sidhu Kumaresan; Vignesh Ravi; Sudha Pushpa
- Cinematography: G. Manishankar
- Edited by: K. Kaamesh; A. Nishar Sharef
- Music by: Aravind Gopalakrishnan; Bharath Sudharsha
- Production company: Dark Artz Entertainment
- Distributed by: Uthraa Productions
- Release date: 3 October 2025
- Country: India
- Language: Tamil

Maria is a 2025 Indian Tamil-language drama film written and directed by Hari K. Sudhan. The film was produced by Hari K. Harasudhan under the banner Dark Artz Entertainment and distributed by Uthraa Production. The film stars Saishri Prabhakaran, Pavel Navageethan, Sidhu Kumaresan, Vignesh Ravi, and Sudha Pushpa in prominent roles. Maria was released theatrically on 3 October 2025 after being screened at film festivals.

== Cast ==
- Saishri Prabhakaran as Maria
- Pavel Navageethan as Anton Lavey
- Sidhu Kumaresan as Agnes
- Vignesh Ravi as Vishnu
- Sudha Pushpa as Daniela

== Production ==
The film was produced by Hari K Harasudhan under Dark Artz Entertainment. The film's cinematography was handled by G. Manishankar, the editing by K. Kaamesh and A. Nishar Sharef, with music composed by Aravind Gopalakrishnan and Bharath Sudharsha.

== Reception ==
Nakkheeran stated that "the director has taken only controversial matters in his hand, which is detrimental to the film."

Abhinav Subramanian of The Times of India stated: "Maria’s a tale of jumping out of the frying pan and into the fire, albeit at a measured pace."
