= Kadaisi Kadhal Kadhai =

2022 romantic drama film

- Theatrical release poster
- Directed by: RKV
- Produced by: E. Mohan
- Starring: Akash Premkumar; Enakshi Ganguly; Mime Gopi; Pugazh; Chaams
- Cinematography: Sivasunder
- Edited by: B. R. Prakash
- Music by: Chetan Krishna
- Production company: S Cube Pictures
- Release date: 30 December 2022
- Country: India
- Language: Tamil

Kadaisi Kadhal Kadhai (English: The Final Love Story) is a 2022 Indian Tamil-language romantic drama film directed by RKV and starring Akash Premkumar, Enakshi Ganguly and Mime Gopi in the lead roles. It was released on 30 December 2022.

== Cast ==
- Akash Premkumar as Thavam
- Enakshi Ganguly as Pavithra
- Mime Gopi
- Pugazh
- Chaams
- Ashiq
- RKV
- Cable Shankar
- Priyadarshini
- Priyanka
- Noble
- Anu
- Suraj Nivethan

== Production ==
Director R. K. Vidyadharan, who had earlier made films such as Vaitheeswaran (2008) and Rasikkum Seemane (2010), marked a return to directing with the film, giving himself the stage name of RKV. During the promotions of the film, he revealed that he had 1,414 scripts ready - and that Kadaisi Kadhal Kadhai was the 531st film in the list.

The shoot of the film was completed in 19 days. The film's trailer was launched in December 2021, with film personalities including Sibi Sathyaraj and K. S. Ravikumar in attendance.

== Reception ==
The film was released on 30 December 2022 across Tamil Nadu. A reviewer from Maalai Malar called the film "watchable", rating it 2.5 out of 5 stars. A critic from Thinaboomi also gave the film a middling review, while Zee News gave the film a negative review.

Film critic Malini Mannath wrote "the film conveys a relevant message about equality of humans and the need to live an egoless existence, but the manner in which it is conveyed, filters the very essence of the message".
