= Maadan Kodai Vizha =

Indian Tamil language drama film

- Theatrical release poster
- Directed by: R.Thangapandi
- Written by: R.Thangapandi
- Produced by: Captain. Sivaprakasam Uthayasuriyan
- Starring: Gokul Gowtham; Sharumiishaa; Dr. Suria Narayanan
- Cinematography: Chinraj Ram
- Edited by: Ravichandran R
- Music by: Vibin R
- Production company: Deiva Productions
- Release date: 14 March 2025
- Country: India
- Language: Tamil

Maadan Kodai Vizha is a 2025 Indian Tamil-language drama film written and directed by R.Thangapandi. The film stars Gokul Gowtham and Sharumiishaa in the lead roles, alongside Dr. Suria Narayanan, Supergood Subramani and Sripriya. The film was produced by Captain. Sivaprakasam Uthayasuriyan under the banner of Deiva Productions.

Maadan Kodai Vizha was released in theatres on 14 March 2025.

== Cast ==
- Gokul Gowtham as Murugan
- Sharumiishaa as Amuthavalli
- Dr. Suria Narayanan as Gnanamuthu
- Supergood Subramani as Thomas
- Sripriya as Mary
- S.Rashmitha as Madhavi
- Sivavelan as Maasanam
- Paulraj Mariappan as Palavesam

== Production ==
The film is written and directed by R.Thangapandi, while the technical team consists of Chinraj Ram as the cinematographer, Ravichandran R as the editor and Vibin R as the music director.

== Reception ==
A critic of Maalai Malar gave 2.5/5 stars and wrote that "Director Ira Thangapandi has directed the film based on the Sudalai Madan Kodai festival. In it, he talks about love, worship methods, religion, and marriage. The dialogues add strength to the film. Cinema Vikatan critic stated that "The script, while interesting in terms of story, is predictable but gets tedious in the second half. Dina Thanthi critic wrote that "Director I. R. Thangapandi has presented a quality film with an interesting and lively screenplay depicting the love, conflict, and family relationship."
