= Pugazh (actor) =

Indian actor, comedian (born 1990)

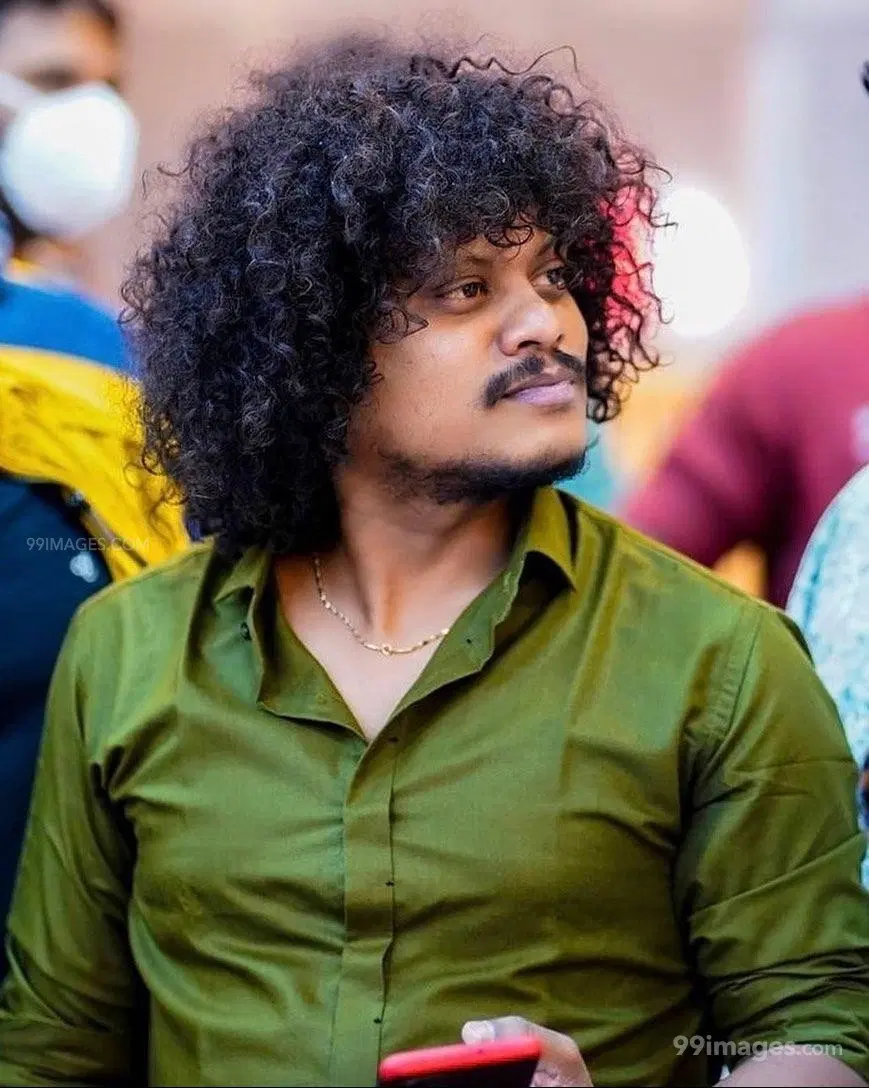
- Born: 14 November 1990 (age 35); Cuddalore, Tamil Nadu, India
- Occupations: Actor; comedian
- Years active: 2016–present
- Spouse: Benzi Riya (m. 2022)
- Children: 1

YouTube information
- Channel: Parattai Pugazh
- Years active: 2020–present
- Genres: Lifestyle, Vlogs
- Subscribers: 1.39 million
- Views: 132 million
- Last updated: 4 August 2026

Pugazhendhi, commonly known as Pugazh or Parattai Pugazh, is an Indian actor and comedian. He rose to fame after appearing on Star Vijay's Cooku with Comali.

== Personal life ==
Pugazh was born on 14 November 1990 in Cuddalore. He was educated at St. Joseph's High School and Sri Padaleswarar Secondary School in Thirupapuliyur. Pugazh married Benzi Riya in 2022. They have one daughter, who was born in September 2023.

== Career ==
Pugazh grew to prominence after appearing as a 'comali' in Cooku with Comali. He is known for his mimicry and humour. Udayaraj of Baana Kaathadi fame helped Pugazh audition for Kalakka Povathu Yaaru, but was not cast. Undeterred, he worked as a computer serviceman at Vijay TV and later starred in Sirippu Da alongside Dheena. Following his later selection and success in Kalakka Povathu Yaaru, he was given the opportunity to participate in Cooku with Comali. He garnered success on the show resulting in several offers to act in Tamil films. He debuted in Sixer and has since starred in more movies like Cocktail, and Sabhaapathy.

== Filmography ==
=== Films ===
Key
†	Denotes films that have not yet been released

List of Pugazh film credits
Year	Film	Role	Notes	Ref.
2019	Sixer	Psychiatrist		
2019	Dha Dha 87	Drunkard		
2019	Kaithi	Victim's relative	Uncredited role	
2020	Cocktail	Local		
2021	Sabhaapathy	Ramani		
2021	Subway	Psycho	short film	
2022	Enna Solla Pogirai	Chitti		
2022	Valimai	'Success' Balu		
2022	Etharkkum Thunindhavan	Aavani Soolamani's sidekick		
2022	Veetla Vishesham	Amal Tailor		
2022	Yaanai	Parattai		
2022	Radha Krishna	Nokuvarman	Premiered on Colors Tamil	
2022	Agent Kannayiram	Detective		
2022	DSP	Poovaali		
2022	Kadaisi Kadhal Kadhai			
2023	Ayothi	Pandi		
2023	August 16 1947	Thavudu		
2023	Karungaapiyam	Tea vendor		
2023	Kasethan Kadavulada	Jack		
2025	Desingu Raja 2	Inspector Varnajalam		
2025	Mr Zoo Keeper	Chinna Thambi	Debut film as lead	
2025	Sotta Sotta Nanaiyuthu	Rocket		
2026	Mustafa Mustafa			

=== Television ===
List of television credits
Year	Title	Season	Role	Platform	Notes	Ref.
2017	Sirippu Daa	—	Contestant	Star Vijay		
2017	Kalakka Povathu Yaaru?	Season 6	Contestant	Star Vijay		
2018	Kalakka Povathu Yaaru?	Season 7	Guest	Star Vijay		
2019	Kalakka Povathu Yaaru?	Season 8	Guest	Star Vijay		
2017	Kalakka Povathu Yaaru? Champions	Season 1	Participant /Contestant	Star Vijay		
2020	Kalakka Povathu Yaaru? Champions	Season 2	Participant /Contestant	Star Vijay		
2019-20	Cooku with Comali	Season 1	Comali	Star Vijay		
2020-21	Cooku with Comali	Season 2	Comali	Star Vijay		
2022	Cooku with Comali	Season 3	Comali	Star Vijay		
2023	Cooku with Comali	Season 4	Comali	Star Vijay		
2024	Cooku with Comali	Season 5	Comali	Star Vijay		
2025	Cooku with Comali	Season 6	Comali	Star Vijay		
2026	Cooku with Comali	Season 7	Comali	Star Vijay		
2019	Super Singer Senior	Season 7	Guest	Star Vijay		
2021	Super Singer Senior	Season 8	Guest	Star Vijay		
2020	Super Singer Junior	Season 7	Guest	Star Vijay		
2021-22	Super Singer Junior	Season 8	Guest	Star Vijay		
2019	Mr. And Mrs. Chinnathirai	Season 1	Guest	Star Vijay		
2020	Mr. And Mrs. Chinnathirai	Season 2	Guest	Star Vijay		
2021	Mr. And Mrs. Chinnathirai	Season 3	Guest	Star Vijay		
2021	Comedy Raja Kalakkal Rani	—	Contestant	Star Vijay		
2021	LOL: Enga Siri Paappom	—	Contestant	Amazon Prime Video	Winner Along With Abhishek	
2021	Behindwoods Awards	—	Host	Behindwoods TV	Along with Manimegalai	
2022	Bigg Boss Ultimate	Season 1	As Detective (Himself)	Disney+ Hotstar	Promotional Video For Snehan	
2023	Ready Steady Po	Season 3	Contestant/Co-Host	Star Vijay	Shifted to Co-Host after Rakshan departed	
2023	Bigg Boss Tamil	Season 7	Guest	Star Vijay	Deepavali Celebration with Srushti Dange	
2025	Single Pasanga	—	Guest	Zee Tamil	Show premiere appearance	

=== Music videos ===
List of music video credits
Year	Song	Artist
2020	"So Soku"	V2 Vijay Vicky, MM Monissha, and Junior Nithya
2022	"Muttu Mu2"	TeeJay Arunasalam, Yogi B, and Sivaangi Krishnakumar

=== Web series ===
Year	Program Name	Role	Network	Notes
2024	Goli Soda Rising	Urundai/Raj Prakash "Raji"	Disney+ Hotstar (now JioHotstar)	Debut Web Series
2025	Om Kali Jai Kali	Mookandi	Disney+ Hotstar (now JioHotstar)	

== Accolades ==
Pugazh Awards and Nominations
Awards and nominations
Award	Wins	Nominations
Vijay Awards	1	0
Behindwoods Awards	1	0
Blacksheep Awards	1	0

Year	Award	Category	Result
2021	Blacksheep Digital Awards	Star Entertainer (Male)	Won
2021	Behindwoods Awards	Best Entertainer on Television (Male)	Won
2021	Vijay Television Awards	Best Comedian	Won
