= Supergood Subramani =

Indian actor

- Born: 1967
- Died: 10 May 2025 (aged 58)
- Occupation: Actor
- Years active: 1995–2025

Supergood Subramani was an Indian character actor who worked in Tamil-language films.

== Career ==
Subramani entered the cinema industry with hopes of becoming a director. He worked as an assistant director to Pavithran for Thirumoorthy (1995) and to Saravana Subbiah for Citizen (2001). He also contributed to the script development discussions for Pen Singam (2010). His association with Super Good Films earned him the name Supergood Subramani. Due to his lack of opportunities, he switched to acting. His first significant role was in Pisaasu (2014), and he gained further recognition for his roles in Pariyerum Perumal (2018) and Jai Bhim (2021). He made his lead debut with Paraman (2024).

== Personal life ==
Subramani was diagnosed with cancer in April 2025. He subsequently died on 10 May 2025 while undergoing treatment at the age of 58.

== Filmography ==
=== Films ===
Year	Title	Role	Notes
2001	Citizen	Butcher	Uncredited
2011	Azhagarsamiyin Kuthirai	Priest	
2012	Manam Kothi Paravai	Tea master	
2013	Naan Rajavaga Pogiren	Inspector	
2013	Varuthapadatha Valibar Sangam	Tahsildar	
2013	Onaayum Aattukkuttiyum	Police officer	
2013	Endrendrum Punnagai	Police Inspector	
2014	Jilla	Police officer	
2014	Mundasupatti	Fake swami	
2014	Uyirukku Uyiraga	Police officer	
2014	Amara Kaaviyam	Corner shop owner	
2014	Oru Oorla Rendu Raja		
2014	Pisaasu	Adaikalam	
2015	Killadi	Chettiar	
2015	Enakkul Oruvan		
2015	Mahabalipuram	Jailor	
2015	Nannbenda	Constable Subramani	
2015	Maari	TV Shop Owner	
2015	Chandi Veeran		
2015	Vasuvum Saravananum Onna Padichavanga	Museum security guard	
2015	Kirumi		
2015	Vellaiya Irukiravan Poi Solla Maatan	Selvarathnam	
2016	Gethu	Police Inspector	
2016	Rajinimurugan	Police Officer	
2016	Visaranai		
2016	Kadhalum Kadandhu Pogum		
2016	Mapla Singam	Marriage Broker	
2016	Pugazh	Venkat's father	
2016	Jithan 2		
2016	Manithan		
2016	Katha Solla Porom	Police Officer	
2016	Raja Manthiri	Alliance broker	
2016	Thirunaal	Principal's friend	
2016	Pagiri	Murugan's father	
2016	Thodari	Cook	
2016	Rekka	David's henchman	
2016	Virumandikkum Sivanandikkum		
2016	Maaveeran Kittu		
2016	Mo		
2017	Jomonte Suvisheshangal	Garments factory owner	Malayalam film
2017	Enakku Vaaitha Adimaigal	Ramesh's father	
2017	Maanagaram	PT Master	
2017	Kattappava Kanom	Water tanker driver	
2017	Pa. Pandi	Police officer	
2017	Rangoon	Manohar	
2017	Sathriyan	Manikandan	
2017	Uru		
2017	Ivan Thanthiran	Bhai	
2017	Podhuvaga Emmanasu Thangam	Cycle-shop owner	
2017	Puriyatha Puthir		
2017	Kathanayagan	Maths Teacher	
2017	Hara Hara Mahadevaki	Priest Sugapoganandha	
2017	Nenjil Thunivirundhal	Lecturer	
2017	En Aaloda Seruppa Kaanom	Police Writer	
2017	Maayavan	Constable Muthukumar	
2017	Balloon		
2018	Gulaebaghavali		
2018	Mannar Vagaiyara		
2018	Kaathiruppor Pattiyal		
2018	Iravukku Aayiram Kangal	Police Constable	
2018	Irumbu Thirai		
2018	Kaala		
2018	Annanukku Jai	Subba Rao	
2018	Seemaraja	Raja's assistant	
2018	Pariyerum Perumal	R. K. Raja	
2018	Vandi		
2019	Boomerang	Short Film Actor	
2019	Pattipulam		
2019	Dharmaprabhu		
2019	Gurkha	Margaret's assistant	
2019	Thozhar Venkatesan	Fake Magician	
2019	Jackpot	Restaurant owner	
2019	Magamuni	Therumunai Thirumurthy	
2019	Aruvam	Parrot Astrologer	
2019	Sangathamizhan		
2019	Irandam Ulagaporin Kadaisi Gundu	Bhai	
2019	Hero	Head master of Shakthi's school	
2020	Utraan	Police Officer	
2020	Vaanam Kottattum		
2020	Kanni Maadam	Aspiring actor	
2020	Ettuthikkum Para		
2020	Cocktail	Police officer	
2020	Soorarai Pottru	Marriage broker	
2020	Thatrom Thookrom	Madhusudhanan	
2020	Kavalthurai Ungal Nanban	Murugesan	
2021	Calls	Azhagesan	
2021	Namma Oorukku Ennadhan Achu	Priest	
2021	Sarpatta Parambarai		
2021	Netrikann	Police officer	
2021	Cinderella	Security Guard	
2021	Jai Bhim	Head Constable Veerasamy	
2021	MGR Magan		
2021	Anandham Vilayadum Veedu	Worker	
2022	Theal	Picture Shop Owner	
2022	Veeramae Vaagai Soodum	Headmaster	
2022	Koorman	Kusthi Teacher	
2022	Etharkkum Thunindhavan	Yazhnila's father	
2022	Dejavu	Constable N. Divakar Bala	
2022	Pistha		
2022	Manja Kuruvi		
2022	Laththi	Minister	
2022	Oh My Ghost	Producer's agent	
2023	Varisu	Police Officer	
2023	Vallavanukkum Vallavan	Head Constable	
2023	Meippada Sei		
2023	Om Vellimalai		
2023	Ariyavan		
2023	Kannai Nambathey	Inspector Paranthaman	
2023	Kudimahaan		
2023	Kadapuraa Kalaikuzhu	Pencil Meesai Perumal	
2023	Let's Get Married	Astrologer	
2023	Partner	Sridhar's father	
2023	The Road	Kaaturosa's father	
2023	Margazhi Thingal	Karuppusamy	
2023	80s Buildup	Constable Mani	
2024	Arimapatti Sakthivel		
2024	Rathnam	Surveyor	
2024	Inga Naan Thaan Kingu		
2024	Saamaniyan		
2024	Turbo	SI Maarimuthu	Malayalam film
2024	Dandupalyam	Inspector Subramani	Tamil version
2024	Maharaja	Toy shop owner	
2024	Brother	Villager	
2024	Emakku Thozhil Romance	Theatre owner	
2024	Paraman	Paraman	
2025	Athu Vaangina Ethu Elavasam		
2025	Maadan Kodai Vizha	Thomas	
2025	Vallamai	Police constable	
2025	Myyal		Posthumous release
2025	Maargan	Aquarium shop owner	Posthumous release
2025	House Mates	Kandhasaamy	Posthumous release
2025	Gift	Police constable	Posthumous release
2026	Nee Forever		Posthumous release
2026	Commandovin Love Story		Posthumous release
2026	Karuppu	Police officer	Posthumous release
TBA	Train		

=== Television ===
Year	Title	Role	Network	Notes
2021	November Story		Disney+ Hotstar	
2024	Parachute	SI Rajan	Disney+ Hotstar	
