= Sathish =

Indian actor and comedian (born 1987)

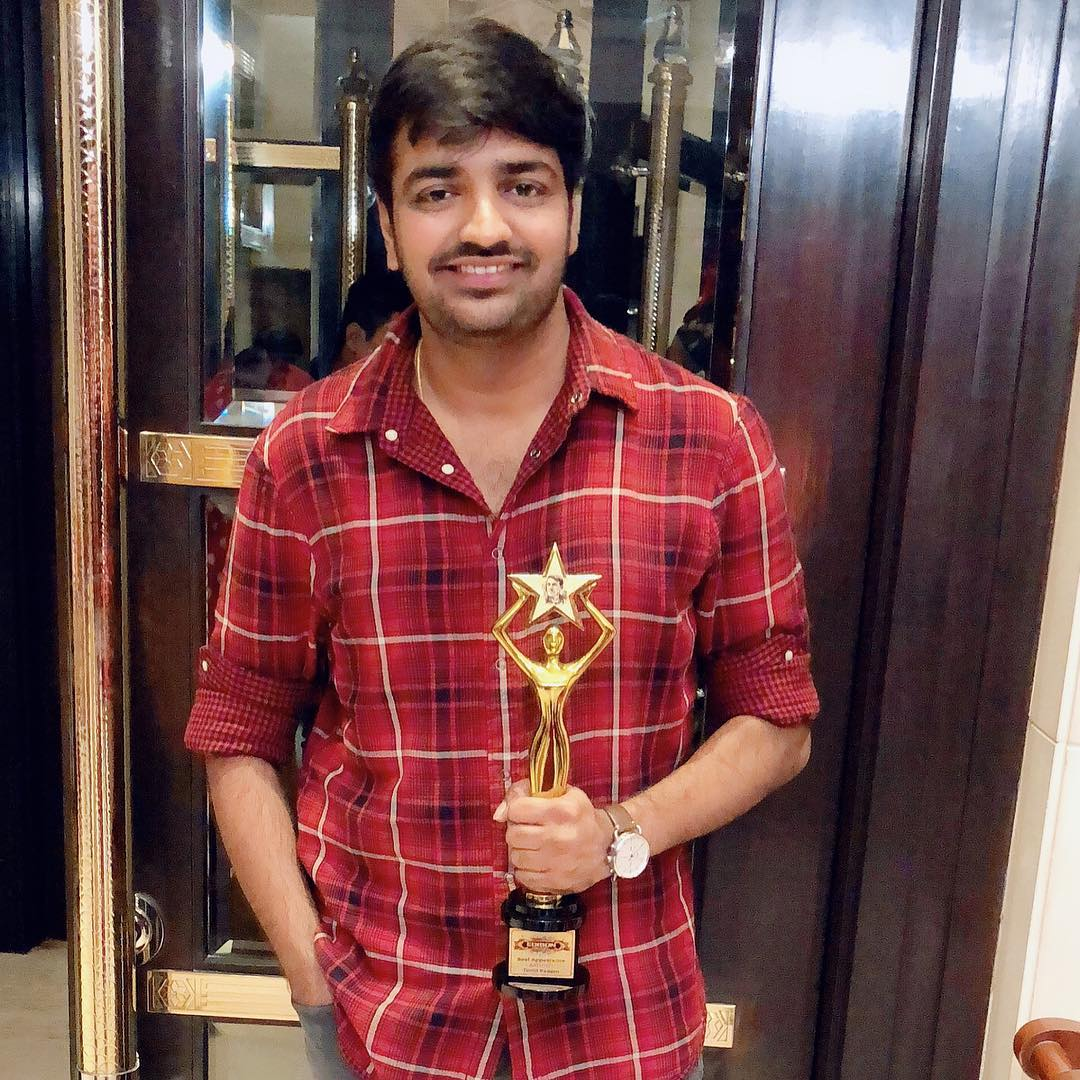
- In 12th Annual Edison Awards on 17 February 2019
- Born: Sathish Muthukrishnan; 23 May 1987 (age 39); Elampillai, Salem, Tamil Nadu, India
- Occupations: Actor; Comedian; Television host
- Years active: 2006–present
- Spouse: Sindhu (m. 2019)
- Children: 1

Sathish Muthukrishnan (born 23 May 1987) is an Indian actor and comedian working in the Tamil cinema. He made a breakthrough portraying a role alongside Sivakarthikeyan in Ethir Neechal (2013). He won Edison Award for Best Comedian for his performance in Kaththi (2014), Thangamagan (2015) and Remo (2016) and Edison Award for Best Appearance for the film Tamizh Padam 2 (2018).

== Personal life ==
Born in a middle-class iyer family, Sathish barely attended school and worked part-time jobs alongside his studies to support his family. Interested in cinema, he joined Crazy Mohan's Troupe in 2001, at the age of 14 and performed for many years as part of the troupe. He received many awards for the dramas from Kamal Haasan and other celebrities.

Sathish married Sindhu in December 2019. The couple have a daughter.

== Career ==
Sathish worked with Crazy Mohan in his theatre troupe for eight years, honing his histrionics and acting, while also helping write dialogues for his productions and acting in their stage plays Meesai Aanaalum Manaivi and Jurassic Baby as Cheenu. His debut was in the movie Jery (2006) where he played a small role. A. L. Vijay made him a co-dialogue writer for Poi Solla Porom (2008), before offering him an acting role in Madrasapattinam (2010).

In 2013 he appeared in Senthil Kumar's Ethir Neechal portraying Sivakarthikeyan's friend, with a critic noting that the duo "complement each other’s comic timing". His next notable role was as an IT professional Sandy in Maan Karate (2014), written by AR Murugadoss. He played an important role in Kaththi (2014), co-starring Vijay in the lead role.

He received Edison Award for Best Comedian for the films Kaththi (2014), Thangamagan (2015) and Remo (2016).

Sathish played the role of an antagonist in the 2018 parody film Tamizh Padam 2, which was written and directed by C. S. Amudhan.

He marks his debut as a lead actor in Naai Sekar (2022). He has delivered his next film as a hero in the horror comedy, titled Conjuring Kannappan (2023). He was later acted in the crime thrillers films such as Vithaikkaaran (2024) and Sattam En Kaiyil (2024).

== Filmography ==
List of Sathish film credits
Year	Film	Role	Notes
2006	Jery	Farooque	credited as Sathish Ilampillai
2008	Poi Solla Porom	—N/a	as dialogue assistant
2010	Tamizh Padam	Pandiya	
2010	Kola Kolaya Mundhirika	Sukku Malli	
2010	Madrasapattinam	Pacha	
2011	Mugaputhagam	Sathish	Short film
2011	Vaagai Sooda Vaa	Kavattaiyan	
2011	Mahaan Kanakku	Mandotharan	
2012	Marina	Makudu	
2012	Maalai Pozhudhin Mayakathilaey	Tarun	
2012	Thaandavam	Bullappan	
2013	Vathikuchi	Vanaraj's friend	
2013	Ethir Neechal	Peter	Nominated, Vijay Award for Best Comedian
2013	Naiyaandi	Chinna Vandu's friend	
2014	Maan Karate	Sandy	
2014	Sigaram Thodu	Kay Kay	
2014	Uyirukku Uyiraga	Karthik's friend	
2014	Kaththi	Ravi/Sodhu	Edison Award for Best Comedian
2015	Aambala	Shakthi	
2015	Tamizhuku En Ondrai Azhuthavum	Raja	
2015	Vai Raja Vai	Sathish	
2015	Thangamagan	Kumaran	Edison Award for Best Comedian
2016	Muthina Kathirikai	Saravanan	
2016	Mudinja Ivana Pudi	Sathish	
2016	Kotigobba 2	Satya's friend	Kannada film
2016	Devi	Mad Max	
2016	Abhinetri	Mad Max	Telugu film
2016	Rekka	Keerai	25th Film
2016	Remo	Vallikanth	Edison Award for Best Comedian; Nominated, SIIMA Award for Best Comedian
2016	Parandhu Sella Vaa	Mani	
2017	Bairavaa	Shanmugam	
2017	Motta Shiva Ketta Shiva	Sathish	
2017	Yaar Ivan	Srinivasan	
2017	Hara Hara Mahadevaki	Kathir	
2017	Solo	Pattu	
2017	Solo	Shekhar's friend	Malayalam film; cameo appearance in "Kandu Nee Enne"
2017	Sathya	Babu Khan	
2017	Velaikkaran	Hari	
2018	Kalakalappu 2	Gopal	
2018	Solli Vidava	Sanjay's friend	
2018	Pakka	'Dhoni' Kumar's friend	
2018	Mr. Chandramouli	Padmani	
2018	Tamizh Padam 2	Pandiya (P) and Peeyar	Dual role Edison Award for Best Appearance
2018	Ghajinikanth	Mohan	
2019	Boomerang	Gopal	
2019	July Kaatril	Murali	
2019	Agni Devi	Sathyamoorthy IPS	
2019	Mr Local	P. Raja	
2019	Gorilla	Sathish	
2019	Sixer	Gimikly	
2019	Aruvam	Sorimuthu	
2020	Seeru	Kobi	
2021	Bhoomi	Bhoominathan's friend	
2021	Teddy	Shiva's friend	50th Film
2021	Sulthan	Shakthi	Guest appearance
2021	Friendship	Jeeva	
2021	Annaatthe	Sathyaseelan	Guest appearance
2021	Raajavamsam	Kannan's friend	
2022	Naai Sekar	Sekar	Debut as lead role
2022	Hostel	Jeeva	
2022	Ranga	Adithyaa's friend	
2022	Kanam	Kathir	
2022	Pistha	Sathish	
2022	Oh My Ghost	Bharathi	
2023	Varisu	Vijay's friend	
2023	Kannai Nambathey	Jagan	
2023	Thudikkum Karangal	Annamalai	
2023	Conjuring Kannappan	Kannappan	
2024	Vithaikkaaran	Vetri and Shakthi	Dual role
2024	Sattam En Kaiyil	Gautham	
2025	Sumo	Inspector V. Anbu	
2026	Mustafa Mustafa	Karthik	

== Television ==
List of performances and appearances on television
Year	Title	Role(s)	Network	Notes
2016	5th South Indian International Movie Awards	Host	Sun TV	Co-hosted with Shiva
2017	6th South Indian International Movie Awards	Host	Sun TV	Co-hosted with Dhanya Balakrishna
2021	LOL: Enga Siri Paapom	Contestant	Amazon Prime	
2023	11th South Indian International Movie Awards	Host	Sun TV	Co-hosted with Pavithra Lakshmi
2024	12th South Indian International Movie Awards	Host	Sun TV	Co-hosted with Bhavana Balakrishnan
