= Om Vellimalai =

- Theatrical release poster
- Directed by: Om Vijay
- Produced by: Rajagopal Elangovan
- Starring: Supergood Subramani; Veera Subash; Anju Krishna
- Cinematography: Maniperumal
- Edited by: Sathish Surya
- Music by: N. R. Raghunanthan
- Production company: Superb Creation
- Release date: 24 February 2023
- Running time: 117 mins
- Country: India
- Language: Tamil

Om Vellimalai is a 2023 Indian Tamil-language comedy drama film directed by Om Vijay and starring Supergood Subramani, Veera Subash and Anju Krishna in the lead roles. It was released on 24 February 2023.

== Cast ==
- Supergood Subramani
- Veera Subash
- Anju Krishna as Manonmani
- Giriraj
- Vijaykumar
- Charrles Pandian
- Kaviraj
- Palanichami

== Production ==
Supergood Subramani, who had played pivotal roles in films including Kadhalum Kadandhu Pogum (2016), Rajinimurugan (2016) and Jai Bhim (2021), was cast in his first lead role. The film was described prior to release as a "social dramedy about siddhargal".

== Reception ==
The film was released on 24 February 2023 across Tamil Nadu. A critic from Dinamalar gave the film a mixed review, while praising some scenes from the film. A critic from The Hindu gave the film a negative review, citing the director could have conceived scenes differently. A reviewer from Dina Thanthi gave the film a largely positive review.
