= Nandhi Varman =

- Theatrical release poster
- Directed by: G.V. Perumalvaradhan
- Written by: G.V. Perumalvaradhan
- Produced by: Arunkumar Dhanasekar
- Starring: Suresh Ravi; Asha Venkatesh
- Cinematography: R. V. Seyon Muthu
- Edited by: San Lokesh
- Music by: Jerard Felix
- Production company: AK Film Factory
- Release date: 29 December 2023
- Country: India
- Language: Tamil

Nandhi Varman is a 2023 Indian Tamil-language supernatural mystery thriller film written and directed by G.V. Perumalvaradhan. It stars Suresh Ravi and Asha Venkatesh in the lead roles. It is produced by Arunkumar Dhanasekar under the banner of AK Film Factory. The music was composed by Jerard Felix with cinematography by R. V. Seyon Muthu and editing by San Lokesh. The film released on 29 December 2023.

== Cast ==
- Suresh Ravi as Guru Varman
- Asha Venkatesh as Elakkiya
- Bose Venkat as Bose Venkatachalam
- Nizhalgal Ravi as Chakravarthi
- Gajaraj as Dharmaraj
- Meesai Rajendran as Pazhanivel Raayan
- Aadukalam Murugadoss as JCB Mani
- Ambani Shankar as Trouser
- Kothandam as Kothandam
- Jayam SK Gopi as S. V. Pasupathi

== Soundtrack ==
Soundtrack was composed by Gerard Felix.

- Adiye Adiye - Pradeep Kumar, Padmaja Srinivasan
- Eesane - Anthony Daasan

== Reception ==
A critic from Times Now gave 3/5 stars and noted that "making it worth a watch for those captivated by atmospheric storytelling and supernatural elements."

The Times of India critic gave 2.5/5 stars and stated that "Nandhi Varman is the film for you because the world-building is admirable."
