= Jjunction =

Junction
- Poster
- Directed by: R. S. Ramanathan
- Written by: R. S. Ramanathan
- Produced by: T. N. Janakiraman
- Starring: Abhinay; Aamna Sharif; Kanishka Sodhi
- Cinematography: P. Primoos
- Edited by: L. Kesavan
- Music by: Bharadwaj
- Production company: Hi-Tec Media
- Release date: 27 September 2002
- Running time: 150 minutes
- Country: India
- Language: Tamil

Junction is a 2002 Indian Tamil-language teen romance film directed by R. S. Ramanathan. The film stars Abhinay, Aamna Sharif and Kanishka Sodhi, with Vinayak Raj, Vennira Aadai Moorthy, Pandu, Ravi Shanth, R. Aishwarya and Meera Krishnan playing supporting roles. It was released on 27 September 2002.

== Plot ==
Kannan is a carefree college student and always hangs out with his group of friends. They spent much of their time smoking cigarettes, drinking alcohol, eve teasing the college girls, making fun of the teachers and loitering around the campus after school. Kannan is also a hardcore fan of cinema actress Meera. Vinay, the senior student, is a womaniser who spoiled the lives of many girls and ragged Kannan for no particular reason. After initial clashes between Kannan and his classmate Jennifer, they eventually fall in love with each other. Meera is a philanthropist who helps the poor and orphan children. One day, Jennifer won a contest to meet Meera but she gives the opportunity to her lover Kannan. Kannan then spends one day with his favourite actress Meera, Meera is therefore attracted by his friendly approach and humorous speech, thus she befriends him. Kannan realizes that she is a genuine and a very humble person. The young Kannan was motivated by his friends to sleep with Meera. Kannan then openly asks her to have sex with him, Meera takes him in her bedroom and asks him to choose between sex and friendship. Kannan chooses friendship and apologizes to her.

One day, the suicide of the college student Bhama (R. Aishwarya) over love-failure distressed the whole college, the culprit of her death is none other than Vinay. Thereafter, Meera falls in love with Kannan and reveals it to Jennifer. When she was a child, the orphan and homeless Meera begged for food, she had to work hard to become a successful actress. Her only consolation was helping the children of the orphanage who call her "sister", but now she finds a soul mate. Jennifer changes her mind after the talk, she decides to sacrifice her love, thus Jennifer starts hanging out with Kannan's arch-enemy Vinay. Kannan, who is deeply in love with Jennifer, does not understand what is going on. Afterwards, Meera learns of Jennifer and Kannan's love and unites them. Vinay then decides to become a good person whereas Meera pursues her acting career.

== Cast ==
- Abhinay as Kannan
- Aamna Sharif as Jennifer
- Kanishka Sodhi as Meera
- Vinayak Raj as Vinay
- Vennira Aadai Moorthy as College Principal
- Pandu as Director
- Ravi Shanth as Idi Amin
- R. Aishwarya as Bhama
- Meera Krishnan as Jennifer's sister-in-law
- Ramesh as Badri
- Vincent Roy as Producer
- Prathyusha
- Neelu
- Rajappa as Rajappa
- M. S. Bhaskar as Sivalingam
- Kallukkul Eeram Ramanathan as Director
- Kovai Senthil as Bhama's father
- Bava Lakshmanan as Tea Master
- Baby Sofia as Young Meera
- Ajay Raj in a special appearance
- Nanditha Jennifer in a special appearance
- Chaams as Konal Govindasamy (uncredited)

== Production ==
The film marked the directorial debut of K. S. Ramanathan, who previously worked as assistant to directors K. S. Ravikumar, R. K. Selvamani and N. Maharajan.

== Soundtrack ==
The music was composed by Bharadwaj.

Song	Singer(s)	Lyrics	Duration
"Devathaiya"	Srinivas, Reshmi	Newton	4:29
"Ithukku Enna Artham"	Yugendran	Snehan	4:32
"Oru Tajmahalai"	Praveen	Annamalai	4:36
"Poo Mugam Siricha"	Balram, Srilekha Parthasarathy	Piraisoodan	4:07
"Shopping Pogum"	Prashanthini	Viveka	4:38

== Reception ==
Malini Mannath of Chennai Online said, "Abhinay gets to play the hero here, and dances, romances and fights without any fuss. The heroines are uncannily alike in appearance, dressing and performance. Pale-faced and anaemic looking, their sole contribution to the film is their willingness to dare and bare" and added, "The script is not very focused, the director not very clear as to what he wants to tell".
