= Abhinay Kinger =

Indian film actor (1981–2025)

- Born: 20 June 1981; Madras, Tamil Nadu, India
- Died: 10 November 2025 (aged 44); Chennai, Tamil Nadu, India
- Occupation: Actor
- Years active: 2002–2014; 2025
- Parent: T. P. Radhamani

Abhinay Kinger (20 June 1981 – 10 November 2025) was an Indian actor who appeared in Tamil and Malayalam-language films. He made his debut in the 2002 film Thulluvadho Ilamai directed by Kasthuri Raja. His final film, Game of Loans, was released posthumously.

== Career ==
Abhinay made his acting debut alongside Dhanush and Sherin in Kasthuri Raja's coming-of-age film Thulluvadho Ilamai (2002). The film's success prompted Abhinay to continue to appear in lead roles, and notably featured in Jjunction (2002), Singara Chennai (2004) and Pon Megalai (2005) as the protagonist.

In the late 2000s, he moved on to play supporting roles and notably featured in films including Solla Solla Inikkum (2009) and Palaivana Solai (2009) in pivotal characters.

He later worked in films as a dubbing artiste, providing the voice of Vidyut Jamwal in Thuppakki (2012) and Anjaan (2014).

His financial status deteriorated due to the death of his mother T. P. Radhamani in 2019 and he battled liver issues in 2025.

His final on-screen appearance was the film Game of Loans, scheduled for posthumous release in 2025.

== Illness and death ==
Kinger later suffered from a liver infection, and faced severe health problems for which he received treatment. He died on 10 November 2025, at the age of 44.

== Filmography ==
=== Films ===
Year	Film	Role	Notes
2002	Thulluvadho Ilamai	Vishnu	
2002	Junction	Kannan	
2002	Kaiyethum Doorath	Kishore	Malayalam film
2003	Success		
2003	Chithrakoodam		Malayalam film
2004	Singara Chennai	Surya	
2005	Daas	Guna	
2005	Pon Megalai	Malarvannan	
2007	Virus		Malayalam film
2008	Thodakkam	Chindo	
2009	Solla Solla Inikkum	Guru	
2009	Palaivana Solai	Yuvan	
2009	Aarumugam	Lawyer	
2009	Karthik Anitha	Gowri Shankar	Guest appearance
2010	Kathai	Anand	
2012	Aarohanam	Karthik	
2013	Endrendrum Punnagai	Karthik	
2014	Vallavanukku Pullum Aayudham	Businessman	
2025	Game of Loans	Vishwa	

=== Dubbing artist ===
- Vidyut Jammwal (Thuppakki, Anjaan)
- Milind Soman (Paiyaa)
- Babu Antony (Kaaka Muttai)
