= Goko Mako =

2019 film directed by Arunkanth

- Film poster
- Directed by: Arunkanth V
- Written by: Arunkanth V
- Produced by: Arunkanth
- Starring: Ramkumar; Dhanusha
- Narrated by: Chaams
- Cinematography: Sukumaran Sundar
- Edited by: Vinoth Sridhar
- Music by: Arunkanth
- Production company: Info Pluto Media Works
- Distributed by: Info Pluto Media Works
- Release date: 14 February 2019
- Running time: 96 minutes
- Country: India
- Language: Tamil
- Budget: 25 lakhs

Goko Mako is a 2019 Tamil language romantic comedy independent film directed by Arunkanth. The film stars Ramkumar, Danusha, Chaams & Kalangal Dinesh in the lead roles with Sara George, Vinod Varma, YG Mahendra and Santhana Bharathi in supporting roles. This is the first Tamil theatrical feature film to be completely shot on a Go Pro.

== Cast ==
- Ramkumar as Puyal
- Danusha as Nila
- Sara George
- Chaams as Pluto
- Kalangal Dinesh
- Y. G. Mahendra as Natchatrian
- Delhi Ganesh as Delhi Ganesh
- Santhana Bharathi as Yamagundan
- Ajay Rathnam as Ajay Rathnam
- Vinod Varma as Vinod Varma

== Production ==
The film was shot in 12 days under a low budget and completely shot on a GoPro. The title of the film is based on Coimbatore colloquial language. Arunkanth V in addition to being the director, was also the producer and music composer. Debutant Ramkumar, nephew of actor Sarathkumar., plays the male lead while Dhanusha plays the female lead. Sara George, who starred in Taramani and Chaams were signed on to play pivotal roles. During the making of the film, the dialogues were not practiced, but were improvised upon filming.

== Release ==
A website was created for pre-release sales to enable the film to run at a low price in multiple multiplexes. The film released on 14 February 2019. A reviewer from Maalai Malar gave the film a mixed review, while film portal ChennaiVision stated the film "gives us a feeling of watching a funny collage of YouTube and TikTok videos."
