= Keralotsavam 2009 =

- Directed by: Shankar Panicker
- Written by: Satheesh K. Sivan; Suresh Menon
- Produced by: Faris Abdul Gafoor
- Starring: Vinu Mohan; Vishnupriya; Kalabhavan Mani; Nedumudi Venu
- Music by: Suhyam Dharman; Shankar
- Production company: Grace International
- Distributed by: Ramya Films
- Release date: 17 December 2009
- Running time: 119 minutes
- Country: India
- Language: Malayalam

Keralotsavam 2009 is a 2009 Indian Malayalam-language action drama film directed by Shankar Panicker and written by Satheesh K. Sivan and Suresh Menon. The film stars Vinu Mohan, Vishnupriya, Nedumudi Venu, and Kalabhavan Mani. The film deals with terrorism taking control of a youngster's dream to make it big in his life.

== Plot ==
Padmanabhan Embranthiri is running an institution viz. 'Kalanikethan'. He is invited to perform the Kerala art forms on the stage of a cultural festival named Keralotsavam 2009. His daughter Ganga was doing research in Mohiniyattam. So she was entrusted in doing all the arrangements of the programme.

Sandeep Subramanyam arrives there to perform Kalaripayattu. There he meets Ganga and falls in love. But he is a terrorist named Javed Ibrahim in disguise and his mission is to blast a bomb during the Keralotsavam event. The terrorist group aims to destroy the communal harmony and evoke a riot. Whether or not Sandeep aka Javed succeeds in the mission forms the climax of the movie.

== Cast ==
- Vinu Mohan as Sandeep Subramaniam / Javed Ibrahim
- Kalabhavan Mani as Jeevan Issac
- Vishnupriya as Ganga
- Nedumudi Venu as Padmanabhan Embranthiri
- Shivaji Guruvayoor
- M. B. Padmakumar as Arshad Kamal
- Salim Kumar
- K. B. Ganesh Kumar
- Sharath S Nair
- Vijay Menon
- Abhirami Suresh
- Indulekha
- Shankar Panicker as dancer (special appearance)

== Production ==
Vishnupriya made her lead debut through this film.

== Release ==
The film was released during Christmas 2009.
