= Mime Gopi =

Indian stage and film actor

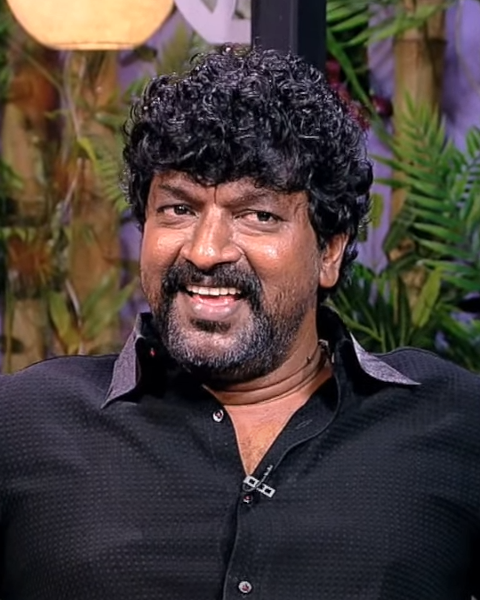
- Gopi in 2019
- Born: 29 June 1977 (age 49)
- Occupation: Actor
- Years active: 2008-present

Mime Gopi (born Gopinathan) is an Indian stage and film actor who has appeared in predominantly Tamil films including Madras (2014), Maari (2015), Maya (2015) and Kabali (2016). He is also the winner of the reality cooking show Cooku with Comali.

== Career ==
Mime Gopi already acted in Saravanan Meenatchi season 1 along with Mirchi Saravanan as money launderer. Prior to his entrance into the film industry, Gopi was a renowned mime actor in Chennai and heading G Mime Studio, a studio which exhibited the art form. In his role, he worked closely with children with special needs to help them adapt miming skills. The actor celebrates every birthday and festivals by doing charity work across Tamil Nadu. He also had contributed money to the local festivals of the religious organisations. He is an inspiration to the upcoming theatre actors. He had set up the studio in 1994 and had worked to expand the art across Chennai.

Mime Gopi shot to fame with director Pa. Ranjith's Madras (2014) and he gave notable performances in Maari (2015), Maya (2015) and Kabali (2016). He has been working in Bairavaa (2017) with Vijay. Gopi has stated that his biggest regret in life as a growing actor is that he wasn't able to act in Seyal (2018). The actor disclosed that though he was approached earlier for the role of a villain, he couldn't accept the offer as he was shooting for another film. But now after seeing the film in a private screening the actor feels like he has really missed out on a fantastic role.

He became the winner of the Cooku with Comali in 2023. With 12 contestants on the roster, Mime Gopi emerged victorious and became the first male contestant ever to win the show.

== Filmography ==
=== Tamil films ===
Year	Title	Role	Notes
2008	Kannum Kannum	Shiva	
2009	Aadatha Aattamellam		Uncredited role
2010	Drohi	Gaana Babu	
2010	Nenjuku Neethi		Short film
2010	Bale Pandiya	AKP's henchman	
2011	Uyarthiru 420	Rowdy	
2013	Inam		Also mime instructor for Karan S.
2014	Vaayai Moodi Pesavum	Politician	
2014	Madras	Perumal	
2014	Kayal		
2014	Ennamo Nadakkudhu	OC Kumar	
2015	Maari	'Bird' Ravi	
2015	Maya	RK	
2015	Unakkenna Venum Sollu	Mathew	
2015	Dummy Tappasu		
2016	Gethu	Kandhan	
2016	Kathakali	Gnanavel Rajarathnam	
2016	Uriyadi	Kumar	
2016	Kabali	Loganathan (Loga)	
2016	Mo	Senthil Nathan	
2017	Bairavaa	Karuvadu Kumar	
2017	Kattappava Kanom	Vanjaram	
2017	8 Thottakkal	Gunasekaran	
2017	Senjittale En Kadhala	Dhamodaran	
2017	Maragadha Naanayam	John	
2017	Uru	Thomas	
2017	Thappu Thanda	Karna	
2017	Theru Naaigal	Maruthamuthu	
2017	Maayavan	Mime Gopi	
2017	Velaikkaran	Kishta	
2018	Madura Veeran	Malaiswamy	
2018	Mr. Chandramouli	Pugazhendhi	
2018	Marainthirunthu Paarkum Marmam Enna	Mattai	
2018	Adanga Maru	Muthukarappan	
2019	Viswasam	Aavudaiyappan	
2019	Nedunalvaadai	Kombiah	
2019	100	Daas	
2019	Lisaa	Shankar	
2019	Jiivi	Kathir	
2019	Jackpot	Rahul's father	
2019	Petromax	Guru	
2019	Sangathamizhan	Gopi	
2019	V1	Chain snatcher's father	
2020	Pizhai	Vedi's father	
2020	Kanni Maadam	Paramasivam	
2020	Cocktail	JP	
2020	Lock Up	Sampath	
2020	Routtu		
2020	Kavalthurai Ungal Nanban	Inspector Kannabiran	
2021	Aatkal Thevai		
2021	Mathil	Senathipathi	A ZEE5 original film
2021	3:33	Exorcist	
2022	Anbulla Ghilli	Sundaram	
2022	Clap	Coach	
2022	Kapalikaram		
2022	Dejavu	ACP	
2022	Jothi	Jothi's father	
2022	Kaatteri	Venu	
2022	Jiivi 2	Kathir	
2022	Kadaisi Kadhal Kadhai		
2022	Top Gear	Siddharth	
2023	Varisu	Union Leader	
2023	Agilan	Manoj Kumar	
2023	Soppana Sundari	Danger Mama	
2023	Kadapuraa Kalaikuzhu	Easwaramoorthy	
2023	Va Varalam Va		
2023	Agori		
2024	Saamaniyan	Pazhani	
2024	Garudan	Nagaraj	
2024	Weapon	Punniyavan	
2024	Petta Rap	King Kumar	
2024	Sattam En Kaiyil	Inspector Anand	
2024	Chennaiyil Vaanam Megamootathudan Kaanapadum	Muthupandi	
2025	Leg Piece	Varadharajan	
2025	Niram Marum Ulagil	Magimai	
2025	Gangers	Malaiyarasan	
2025	Peranbum Perungobamum	Muthupandi	
2025	Friday		
2026	Manithan Deivamagalam	Inbharaj	
2026	Vishwanath & Sons	Thangavel	
2026	Enemy of the Smuggler		

=== Telugu films ===
Year	Title	Role	Notes
2018	Chalo	Veeramuthu	
2020	Bheeshma	Purushottam	
2021	Gully Rowdy	Bairagi Naidu	
2021	Pushpa: The Rise	Chennai Murugan	
2022	Hero	Arjuna	
2022	Clap	Coach	
2022	Like, Share & Subscribe	Gopanna	
2022	Jetty		
2022	Top Gear	Siddharth	
2023	Waltair Veerayya	Das	
2023	Hunt	Roy	
2023	Salaar: Part 1 – Ceasefire	Bilal	
2024	Ooru Peru Bhairavakona	Shankar	
2024	Sabari	Psycho Surya	
2024	Aay	Durga	
2024	Pushpa 2: The Rule	Chennai Murugan	
2025	Robinhood	Varada	
2026	S Saraswathi		
2026	Bad Boy Karthik	Govindappa	

=== Malayalam films ===
Year	Title	Role
2019	Brother's Day	Peeli's father
2024	Kummattikali	
2025	Maine Pyar Kiya	

=== Television ===
Year	Title	Role	Network	Language	Notes
2021	Sundari	Kalyanasundaram	Sun TV	Tamil	Guest appearance
2021	The Family Man	Bhaskaran Palanivel	Amazon Prime Video	Hindi	Season 2
2023	Cooku with Comali 4	Contestant	Star Vijay	Tamil	Winner
2024	Inspector Rishi	Sekar	Amazon Prime Video	Tamil	
2024	Sshhh		aha	Tamil	Anthology series
2025	Nadu Center	Vetri's father	JioHotstar	Tamil	
