= Krodh (film) =

2000 Indian action drama film by Ashok Honda

- Directed by: Ashok Honda
- Written by: Naeem Ejaz (dialogues)
- Screenplay by: Santosh Saroj
- Story by: Siddique
- Based on: Hitler by Siddique
- Produced by: Ashok Honda
- Starring: Sunil Shetty; Rambha
- Cinematography: Teja
- Edited by: Ashok Honda
- Music by: Anand–Milind
- Production company: Ashok Honda Productions
- Release date: 17 March 2000
- Running time: 161 min
- Country: India
- Language: Hindi

Krodh (transl. Wrath) is a 2000 Indian action drama film directed and produced by Ashok Honda. It stars Sunil Shetty and Rambha in lead roles. The film is a remake of the 1996 Malayalam film Hitler, starring Mammootty and Shobhana. It was hit at the box office.

== Plot ==
Short-tempered Karan (known as Hitler because of his anger) has the responsibility of looking after his five younger sisters, and he does so with dedication, affection, and diligence. When the time comes to get his sisters married, he decides to arrange marriages for them one by one. But things didn't go quite well for the first sister, Asha, resulting in bitterness all around. Then the second sister, Seema, falls in love with Raj Verma, whom Karan dislikes, and will not permit Seema to meet, let alone marry. It does not help matters when their father, a former convict, Balwant, is shot by rival gangsters and is hospitalized. Karan goes to see his dying father, and from him learns a secret that would change his life and outlook forever.

== Cast ==
- Suniel Shetty as Karan
- Rambha as Pooja Verma
- Johnny Lever as Prem
- Apoorva Agnihotri as Raj Verma
- Kader Khan as Balwant
- Mohan Joshi as Advocate Verma
- Sakshi Shivanand as Seema
- Anjana Mumtaz as Mrs. Verma
- Harish Patel as Rambhau
- Rami Reddy as Kabra
- Ponnambalam as Munna
- Himani Shivpuri as Sita

== Soundtrack ==
Krodh

Studio album by Anand–Milind
- Released: 4 February 2000
- Genre: Feature film soundtrack
- Label: Tips Music

Lyrics by Dev Kohli and Deepak Chaudhary.

#	Title	Singer(s)
1	"Mera Kangna"	Abhijeet, Alka Yagnik
2	"Hai Deewana"	Sapna Mukherjee
3	"What To Do"	Udit Narayan, Alka Yagnik
4	"Sun Baba Sun"	Roop Kumar Rathod, Sapna Mukherjee
5	"Janejana Janejana"	Alka Yagnik
6	"Mamta Bhare" Part I	Vinod Rathod, Sadhana Sargam
7	"Mamta Bhare" Part II	Sadhana Sargam
8	"Mamta Bhare" Part III	Sadhana Sargam
