= Pavel Navageethan =

Indian actor and filmmaker

Pavel Navageethan Pavel Navageethan 2026
- Born: 17 January 1984 (age 42); Chengalpattu, Tamil Nadu, India
- Other name: Madras Viji
- Years active: 2014–present

Pavel Navageethan (born 17 January 1984) is an Indian actor and filmmaker who works in Tamil cinema.

== Acting career ==
Pavel Navageethan is an Indian film Actor, Writer, and Director and who predominantly works in South Indian Cinema. He is also a professional trainer in theatre, scriptwriting, life skills, photography and film making. He has directed several award-winning short films, documentaries, docudramas and his debut feature film V1 Murder Case was a huge profited movie in OTT platform in Tamil cinema.

He made his acting debut in the Tamil film Madras. He marked his presence in some of the well-known films such as Kuttram Kadithal (2015), Magalir Mattum (2017), Vada Chennai (2018) and Peranbu (2019), .

In 2021, he marks his Telugu debut in Sridevi Soda Center as the main antagonist.

== Filmography ==
- All films are in Tamil except where noted.

=== As actor ===
Year	Film	Role	Notes
2014	Madras	Viji	
2015	Kuttram Kadithal	Udhayan	
2017	Munnodi	Jeyaveeran	
2017	Theru Naaigal	Vinoth	
2017	Magalir Mattum	Karthi Gothandaraman	
2018	Vada Chennai	Siva	
2019	Peranbu	Babu	
2021	Thittam Irandu	Bharani	
2021	Navarasa	Anwar	Segment: Inmai / Fear
2021	Boomika	Dharman	
2021	Sridevi Soda Center	Kasi	Telugu film
2022	Valimai	Selvam	
2022	Taanakkaran	Kadar Basha	
2023	Viduthalai Part 1	Pavel / Photographer	
2023	Are You Ok Baby?	Ezhil	
2024	Vithaikkaaran	Tyson	
2024	Election	Idhayakani	
2024	Sattam En Kaiyil	ASI Basha	
2024	Viduthalai Part 2	Pavel	
2025	Usurae	Latchee	
2025	Maria	Anton Lavey	
2026	Mustafa Mustafa		
2027	Arasan		
2027	kuttram kadithal 2		
2027	Yathrigan		
2027	Love bite		
2027	Yamirruka		
2027	Kasak		
2027	Viral		
2027	One		
2027	Neela vanna kaddu		
2027	Manar kadigai		
2027	Ratham sinthiya Desam		
2027	Master Plan		
2027	Dhik Dhik Dhik		
2027	Off the record		(Web series) sonyliv
2027	Pan india		Telugu

=== As director ===
Year	Film	Ref.
2019	V1 Murder Case	

=== As dubbing artist ===
Year	Film	Actor
2019	Nerkonda Paarvai	Sujith Shankar
2019	Auto Shankar	Appani Sarath
2019	Jallikattu	Antony Varghese
