= Mo (2016 film) =

2016 Indian film by Bhuvan Nullan R

- Directed by: Bhuvan Nullan R
- Written by: Bhuvan Nullan R
- Starring: Aishwarya Rajesh; Suresh Ravi; Ramesh Thilak; Darbuka Siva; Ramdoss
- Cinematography: K. Vishnu Shri
- Edited by: Gopinath
- Music by: Santhosh Dhayanidhi
- Production company: WTF Infotainment LLP
- Release date: 30 December 2016
- Running time: 136 minutes
- Country: India
- Language: Tamil

Mo is a 2016 Tamil horror comedy film written and directed by Bhuvan Nullan R, with Aishwarya Rajesh, Suresh Ravi, Ramesh Thilak, Darbuka Siva and Ramdoss in the leading roles, while Pooja Devariya, Selva, and Mime Gopi play supporting roles. The film was edited by Gopinath with music composed by Santhosh Dhayanidhi. The film, featuring a new technical crew, began production during 2015 and released on 30 December 2016.

== Plot ==
Vetri, a real estate businessman, plans to buy an old school in Pondicherry to establish a new resort there. Another opponent businessman Senthil Nathan has more of a chance of finishing the final deal. Senthil's horoscope says that he should never own a haunted property, and he has a fear of ghosts.

Dev, Sathish, and Kumar are childhood friends who have been involved in cheating practices for money from childhood. They discover a new idea to cheat people using their fear of ghosts. Priya, a junior film artist who dreams of becoming a heroine someday, and Joseph Chellappa, a film makeup artist, join the three. Priya acts as the ghost, and Joseph does her makeup. Priya does this to make her brother Gautham continue his schooling. Dev, Sathish, and Kumar act as exorcists.

One day, the five plans to cheat Vetri but get trapped. Vetri assigns them a task to do the same ghost drama in the school in Pondicherry in order to make Senthil drop his plan of buying the property. They accept the deal and go to Pondicherry. They do all sorts of paranormal activities, and Senthil's men believe that the school is haunted. However, they themselves feel certain abnormal things happening around them. The next day, Vetri tells them about Senthil's visit to the school at night. Priya does not accompany them as she falls sick. All the boys reach the school. This time, Chellappa acts as the ghost, and they do the paranormal activities again. After Senthil runs, they themselves again feel the same activities and hear a hiccup sound. All four run out of the school and reach their rooms; they find that Priya has gone to the school in search of them.

They go to the school to rescue Priya and find her possessed by a ghost. They find her in a horror look scribbling on the board. They seek the help of a priest in the nearby church. He gives them holy water and a bible. They read the bible and throw the holy water on the ghost-obsessed Priya. The ghost calms down and tells them that she is Mohanavadhani alias Mo, who always dreamed of becoming a math teacher. When her dreams came true, she died out of continuous hiccups on the first day of her class as a teacher. She wants her unfulfilled dream of teaching math. She makes all four men sit and teaches them math. Finally, Mo's spirit leaves Priya’s body, tired of teaching the four dumb men.

The movie ends with the school successfully being sold by Vetri, Priya becoming the heroine of a ghost film, and Chellapa being her makeup man. However, Dev, Sathish, and Kumar continue cheating people.

== Cast ==
- Aishwarya Rajesh as Priya
- Suresh Ravi as Dev
- Ramesh Thilak as Sathish
- Darbuka Siva as Kumar
- Ramdoss as Joseph Chellappa
- Pooja Devariya as Mo (Mohanavadhani)
- Selva as Vetri
- Mime Gopi as Senthil Nathan
- Yogi Babu as Pazhani
- Saran Shakthi as Gautham
- Nandagopal MK as Virgin boy
- Supergood Subramani

== Production ==
Bhuvan Nullan launched the film in early 2015 and signed Aishwarya Rajesh and Suresh Ravi to play the lead roles. The film was extensively shot across the suburbs of Chennai and was revealed to be complete by January 2016.

== Release ==
Mo released on 30 December 2016.

== Soundtrack ==
Mo

Soundtrack album by Santhosh Dhayanidhi
- Released: 2016
- Recorded: 2016
- Genre: Feature film soundtrack
- Length: 3:29
- Language: Tamil
- Producer: Santhosh Dhayanidhi

Santhosh Dhayanidhi chronology
Inimey Ippadithan (2015)	Mo (2016)	Enakku Vaaitha Adimaigal (2017)

The soundtrack was composed by Santhosh Dhayanidhi, who had earlier composed the Santhanam-starrer Inimey Ippadithan.

Track listing (Tamil)
No.	Title	Singer	Length
1.	"Ellarum Kedi"	Varun Padhmanabhan	3:29
Total length:			3:29
