= Kavalthurai Ungal Nanban =

2020 film by RDM

- Theatrical release poster
- Directed by: RDM
- Written by: RDM
- Produced by: Rajapondiyan; Bhaskaran B Suresh Ravi
- Starring: Suresh Ravi; Raveena Ravi; Mime Gopi
- Cinematography: K. S Vishnushri
- Edited by: Vadivel; Vimalraj
- Music by: Adithyha; Soorya
- Production companies: BR Talkies Corporation; White Moon Talkies
- Distributed by: Creative Entertainers and Distributors
- Release date: 27 November 2020
- Running time: 126 minutes
- Country: India
- Language: Tamil

Kavalthurai Ungal Nanban (transl. Police department is your friend) is a 2020 Indian Tamil language crime thriller film written and directed by RDM. Produced by Rajapondiyan, Bhaskaran B and Suresh Ravi under the banners of BR Talkies Corporation and White Moon Talkies. The film stars Suresh Ravi and Raveena Ravi, with RJ Munna, Supergood Subramani and Sharath Ravi in supporting roles. This film was presented by Vetrimaaran. The film was released on 27 November 2020.

== Synopsis ==
When his wife is robbed and molested, Prabhu attempts to report the crime, but the police take a dislike to him and subject him to mistreatment. Later, Prabhu visits the police station to obtain a no-objection certificate (NOC) for a passport. A sub-inspector instructs him to write an incorrect letter, to which Prabhu objects by scribbling over the letter and leaving the station. The inspector subsequently threatens to withhold the NOC. Prabhu returns to the station and hits the inspector with a chair, leaving him in a coma. Prabhu is arrested, tortured, and finally carried away yo another police station. When his wife comes looking for him, the police claim not to know where he is.

== Cast ==
- Suresh Ravi as Prabhu
- Raveena Ravi as Indhu
- Mime Gopi as Kannabiran
- Supergood Subramani as Murugesan
- Sharath Ravi as Sathish
- RJ Munna as Sathyan
- Kathiravan Balu as Manikandan
- Sathyan as Senthil

== Production ==
In 2018, the film director RDM, also known as Ranjith Manikandan, has zeroed in on the popular slogan, Kavalthurai Ungal Nanban, for the title of his next film. Video jockey Suresh Ravi was cast in the lead role. The film director and the actor had previously collaborated for a comedy caper titled Adhi Maedhavigal in 2014, which was shelved before release. Talking about the film, Suresh Ravi said, "KUN will be the first heavy-weight drama in my career. The film will play on the relationship dynamics between a police officer and a food delivery executive, who come together by chance. While I play the delivery boy, Mime Gopi will be seen as the cop. Our film will celebrate the real police spirit, which is, unfortunately, being shown in poor light in many films". In January 2020, the film producer G. Dhananjayan had acquired all the rights of the film.

== Reception ==
M. Suganth rated the film 3.5 out of 5 and called it, "A harrowing account of how institutions of power abuse it". Navein Darshan of The New Indian Express said, "KUN is a reminder that content is king and presenting a hard-hitting story is still possible sans any big names. If only this effectively arresting film hadn't fallen prey to some commercial compromises and monotonous representation, it could have been so much more". Sify said, "the title Kaavalthurai Ungal Nanban might sound as if the film is yet another fictional plot to glorify the cops. But the film's director RDM has registered the vicious side of the police force with his maiden venture, which is hard-hitting".
