= Project C (Chapter 2) =

2022 Tamil language drama film

- Theatrical release poster
- Directed by: Vno
- Produced by: Sri
- Starring: Sri; Vasudha Krishnamoorthy; Chaams
- Cinematography: Sathish Anand
- Edited by: Dinesh Gandhi
- Music by: Sibu Sukumaran
- Production company: Shark Fin Studios
- Distributed by: Action Reaction Jenish
- Release date: 23 December 2022
- Running time: 111 minutes
- Country: India
- Language: Tamil

Project C (Chapter 2) is a 2022 Indian Tamil-language drama thriller film directed by Vno and starring Sri, Vasudha Krishnamoorthy and Chaams in the lead roles. It was released on 23 December 2022.

== Cast ==
- Sri as Ram
- Vasudha Krishnamoorthy
- Chaams as Praveen
- Ramjee
- Balaji Venkatraman
- Kovai Gurumurthy

== Production ==
The film marked director Vno's second project after Mangai Maanvizhi Ambugal (2018). The film was marketed as India's first sophomore film, with Chapter 2, later to be followed by a prequel and a sequel. The film's first look poster was released in May 2022 by S. R. Prabhu of Dream Warrior Pictures. The film's producer, Sri, also played the lead role.

== Reception ==
The film was released on 23 December 2022 across Tamil Nadu. A reviewer from Maalai Malar noted the film was "admirable", giving it 2.75 out of 5 stars. The critic from Dina Thanthi also praised the film's suspenseful storytelling. Critic Malini Mannath noted "fairly intriguing in its take, Project C-Chapter 2 could be a one-time watch for hardcore lovers of the genre." A reviewer from Dina Thanthi noted that the director had created a good film.
