= T. P. Radhamani =

Indian actress (died 2019)

T.P Radhamani
- Born: 1951/1952
- Died: 20 October 2019
- Occupation: Actress
- Years active: 1966–2013
- Spouse: Kanayyalal
- Children: Abhinay

T. P. Radhamani (1951 or 1952 – 20 October 2019) was an Indian actress who was active in Malayalam and Tamil movies. She began her career at the age of 14. With about 105 films to her credit, the actress is best known for her role in Utharayanam. Oru Yathramozhi, the 1997 movie starring Mohanlal, was her last Malayalam film. She died on 20 October 2019 due to cancer. Her son was the actor Abhinay.

== Career ==
She started her career at an age of 14. Her first appearance in a movie was in a song for the movie called Sindooracheppu. When actor Thilakan made his debut in the movie Periyar, Radhamani acted in the role of his sister. She has worked with actors like Prem Nazir, Sathyan, Madhu, Jayan, M.G Soman, Mammootty and also with Tamil actors including Kamal Haasan, Prabhu and Vijay Sethupathi. She had also acted along with Shah Rukh Khan for the 2013 movie Chennai Express. This was also her last appearance in a movie.

She was a recipient of the Kerala Sangeetha Nataka Akademi Award.

== Films ==
- Ezhu Raathrikal (1968)
- Veettumrigam (1969)
- Thurakkaatha Vaathil (1970)
- Aa Chithrashalabham Parannotte (1970)
- Abhayam (1970)
- Othenante Makan (1970)
- Prathidhwani (1971)
- Jalakanyaka 1971
- Kalithozhi 1971
- Marunnattil Oru Malayali 1971
- Sindooracheppu 1971
- Ananthashayanam (1972)
- Nrithasaala (1972)
- Sathi (1972)
- Chembarathi (1972)
- Periyar 1973
- Ladies Hostel (1973)
- Periyar (1973)
- Nakhangal (1973)
- Pachanottukal (1973)
- Prethangalude Thaazhvara (1973)
- Kaalachakram (1973)
- Kaattu Vithachavan (1973)
- Udayam (1973)
- Swapnam (1973)
- Soundaryapooja (1973)
- Veendum Prabhaatham (1973)
- Youvanam (1974)
- Arakkallan Mukkaalkkallan (1974)
- College Girl
- Uttarayanam 1975
- Chief Guest (1975)
- Cheenavala
- Picnic (1975)
- Agnipushpam (1976)
- Romeo (1976)
- Vidarunna Mottukal (1977)
- Kodiyettam 1978
- Sanmanassullavarkku Samaadhaanam (1986)
- Oridathu 1987
- Aranyakam 1988
- Oozham (1988)
- Innaleyude Baakki (1988)
- Mudra 1989
- Rugmini 1989
- Aadyathe Kanmani (1995)
- Kokkarakko (1995)
- Hitler (1996)
- Sukhavasam (1996)
- Sathyabhamakkoru Premalekhanam (1996)
- Dilliwala Rajakumaran (1996)
- Nandagopaalante Kusruthikal (1996)
- Oru Yathramozhi (1997)
- Kathanayakan (1997)
- Mr. Clean (1997)
- Pranayavarnangal (1998)
- American Ammayi (1999)
- Namukkore Koodaram (2001)
- Nilaathooval (2002)
- Ananthapuram Raajakumaari (2003)
- Anuvaadamillaathe (2006)
- Chennai Express - 2013 - Hindi film
- Vanmam - 2014 - Tamil film
- Mannar Vagaiyara - 2018 - Tamil film

== TV Serial ==
- Pennurimai (Doordarshan)
- Snehaseema (Doordarshan)
