= Java Sundaresan =

Indian actor

- Born: Swaminathan; 30 November 1972 (age 53); Trichy, India
- Other name: Chaams
- Occupations: Actor, comedian
- Years active: 1998–present
- Spouse: Uma
- Children: 2

Swaminathan, also known by his current stage name Java Sundaresan or his former stage name Chaams, is an Indian actor and comedian who has appeared in predominantly Tamil language films.

He has mainly appeared in supporting roles, notably in Crazy Mohan dramas and playing one of the several leads in Palaivana Solai (2009) and Onbadhule Guru (2013).

== Career ==
Since there was another actor by his birth name of Swaminathan, he briefly considered Chama as a stage name, which was what he was called by Crazy Mohan. He acted as Kushma Devi, a lady with a moustache in the play Meesai Aanalum Manaivi. He renamed himself as Chaams for the serial Chinna Papa Periya Papa. He initially acted with comedians like Vadivelu and supported their comedy roles and later bagged larger roles.

His breakthrough role came in the film Arai En 305-il Kadavul as Java Sundaresan, an aspiring software engineer who bags a job due to his knowledge of Java. He constantly climbs the social ladder due to his high paying job. In the year 2009, a film named Palaivana Solai was released which was a remake version of the same film released in 1981 where a love story of five friends woven around one simple girl received critics appreciation. Chaams played the lead role as one of the five friends.

Chaams garnered acclaim for his role in Payanam (2011) as a fan of "Shining Star" Chandrakanth (inspired by "Super Star" Rajinikanth). Rediff stated that a "special mention must be made of Chaams" as he provided "excellent comic relief". The Hindu stated that "Chaams as the doting fan whose blinkers fall off" is "a riot". Similarly in the year 2013, another film Onbadhule Guru was released, where he played the role of a disgruntled married man who wanted to go back to his bachelor days along with his other friends. The film needed all leading actors to do comedy as per the script. He played one of the leads in the film Thittam Poattu Thirudura Kootam (2019).

In 2021, Chaams played the lead role in the film Operation JuJuPi as a serious man. In 2025, he changed his stage name from Chaams to Java Sundaresan as many meme creators were using the latter name.

== Filmography ==
Year	Title	Role	Notes
1998	Kaadhal Mannan	Gurusaamy	Uncredited role
2002	King	Hollywood director's assistant	Uncredited role
2002	Jjunction	Konal Govindasamy	Uncredited role
2003	Pavalakkodi	Shyam	Uncredited role
2003	Anbe Un Vasam	College student	Uncredited role
2004	Perazhagan	Groom	Uncredited role
2005	Sachein	Ayyasamy's friend	credited as Swaminathan
2005	Kundakka Mandakka	Roopa's groom	
2005	Aaru	Rajamani	
2006	Jerry	Dhandapani	
2006	Manathodu Mazhaikalam	Employee	Uncredited role
2006	E	Ganeshan	
2006	Veyil	Meenakshi's brother	Uncredited role
2007	Thaamirabharani	Sombunakki	
2007	Karuppusamy Kuththagaithaarar	Gold shop owner's son	
2007	Sivi	Still photographer	Deleted scene
2007	Azhagiya Tamil Magan	Train passenger	
2007	Vel	Swathi's brother-in-law	
2008	Arai En 305-il Kadavul	Java Sundaresan	
2008	Kathavarayan		
2008	Vallamai Tharayo	Office Manager	
2008	Kanchivaram	Translator	
2008	Kadhalil Vizhunthen	Meera's friend	
2008	Silambattam	Ammanji	
2008	Abhiyum Naanum	A man at the school admissions interview	
2009	Newtonin Moondram Vidhi	Rangaswamy	
2009	Rajadhi Raja	Doctor	
2009	Suriyan Satta Kalloori	Kethu	
2009	Palaivana Solai	Iniyan	
2010	Rasikkum Seemane		Uncredited role
2010	Irumbukkottai Murattu Singam	Translator	
2010	Maanja Velu		
2010	Raavanan	Wedding photographer	
2010	Enthiran	Barber	
2010	Ambasamudram Ambani	Bank cashier	
2010	Virudhagiri	Saamy	
2011	Payanam	Balaji	Bilingual film
2011	Rajapattai	Funny Actor	
2011	Sankarankovil		
2011	Uyarthiru 420		
2012	Dhoni	Subramaniam's coworker	
2012	Manam Kothi Paravai	Das	
2013	Onbadhule Guru	Guru	
2013	Azhagan Azhagi		
2013	Yamuna	Punniyakkodi	
2013	Desingu Raja	Idhayakani's friend	
2013	Muthu Nagaram		
2014	Uyir Mozhi	Gamma	
2014	Bramman	Chaams	
2014	Nalanum Nandhiniyum		
2014	Aindhaam Thalaimurai Sidha Vaidhiya Sigamani	Sarvanana Bhavan supervisor	
2015	Kanchana 2	Aravind Saamy	
2015	Maanga	Kalakkal	
2015	49-O	Chaams	
2015	Thoongaa Vanam	Busboy	Bilingual film
2015	Uppu Karuvaadu	Ilango	
2015	Bhooloham	Aalayam	
2016	Unnodu Ka	Deal matrimony owner	
2016	Vellikizhamai 13am Thethi	Saravanan's friend	
2016	Ennama Katha Vudranunga		
2016	Andaman		
2016	Manal Kayiru 2	Santhakumar	
2017	Singam 3	G. Sathyan	
2017	Motta Shiva Ketta Shiva	Chamu	
2017	Chitrangada	Airport passenger	Telugu film; uncredited
2017	Oru Mugathirai	Ulaganathan	
2017	Aarambamey Attakasam		
2017	Saravanan Irukka Bayamaen	Rajadurai	
2017	Bongu	Car mechanic	
2017	Kalavaadiya Pozhuthugal		
2017	Enbathettu		
2018	Adanga Maru	Drunkard	
2018	Keni		
2018	Enga Kattula Mazhai		
2018	Lakshmi	Bus conductor	
2018	Saamy Square	Sundaram	
2018	Kalavani Mappillai	Stepni	
2019	Charlie Chaplin 2	Homosexual man	
2019	Goko Mako	Pluto	Also narrator
2019	Enakku Innum Kalyanam Aakale		
2019	Sixer	Homosexual man in restaurant	
2019	Thittam Poattu Thirudura Kootam	Padmanaban alias Buddy	
2019	Market Raja MBBS	Vardharajan	
2019	Chennai 2 Bangkok		
2019	Naan Avalai Sandhitha Pothu	Moorthy's friend	
2020	Sandimuni		
2020	College Kumar	Swami	Bilingual film
2020	Indha Nilai Maarum	Jack	
2020	Irandam Kuththu	Ram	
2020	Kanni Raasi	Ambur Ram Iyer	
2021	Centha		
2021	Paramapadham Vilayattu	Kalingan's assistant	
2021	Pei Mama		
2021	Raajavamsam	Rangan	
2021	Naruvi		
2021	Operation JuJuPi		
2022	Yutha Satham	Jack	
2022	Sivi 2	Khalifa	
2022	Diary	Aasai Raja	
2022	Rivet		
2022	Project C (Chapter 2)	Praveen	
2022	Kadaisi Kadhal Kadhai		
2023	Raakadhan		
2023	Dhillu Irundha Poradu		
2023	Sri Sabari Ayyappan		
2023	Tik Tok		
2024	Local Sarakku	Film actor	
2024	Haraa	Security	
2024	Boat	Lal	
2024	Jolly O Gymkhana	Manager's assistant	
2024	Thiru.Manickam	Narayanan	
2025	Dinasari	Broker	
2025	Badava	Bar custumer	
2025	Leg Piece		
2025	Konjam Kadhal Konjam Modhal	Karthik's uncle	
2025	School	Assistant Principal Manmadhan	
2025	Madras Matinee	Pickle seller	
2025	Desingu Raja 2	Pulipandi	
2025	Flashback		Only the Hindi dubbed version was released.
2025	Kambi Katna Kathai		
2026	Sweety Naughty Crazy	Astrologer	
2026	Lucky the Superstar	Dog Hunter	credited as Chaams
2026	Mustafa Mustafa		
2026	TN 2026	Film Director	
2026	Theeyor Koodam		
2026	Magudam	Car driver	
2026	Vishwanath & Sons	Child Welfare Committee Member	
2026	Meesaya Murukku 2	Hotel Manager	
2026	Singgaramm		

=== Television ===
List of performances and appearances on television
Year	Program	Role(s)	Channel	Notes	Ref.
2003–2004	Chinna Papa Periya Papa	Chidambaram	Sun TV		
2004	Vidathu Sirippu	Evil scientist	Jaya TV		
2006-2008	Anjali	Gopal	Sun TV		

Music video

- Lovendra Cassandra
