= Palaivana Solai (2009 film) =

- Title card
- Directed by: R. S. Dayalan
- Screenplay by: R. S. Dayalan
- Story by: S. Rajasekar
- Starring: Nithin Sathya; Abhinay; V. Sanjeev; Sathyan; Chaams; Karthika Mathew
- Cinematography: S. Murthy
- Music by: E. K. Bobby
- Production company: Maruthi Films
- Release date: 7 November 2009
- Country: India
- Language: Tamil

Palaivana Solai (transl. Oasis) is a 2009 Indian Tamil-language buddy drama film directed by R. S. Dayalan, starring Nithin Sathya, Abhinay, V. Sanjeev, Sathyan, Chaams and Karthika Mathew. It is a remake of the 1981 Tamil film of the same name. The film failed to replicate the success of the original film.

== Plot ==
Ramana, Yuvan, Aadhi, Prabhu and Iniyan are friends in a locality. Yuvan is a spoilt-brat and is the son of a rich entrepreneur. Ramana is a caring brother who is determined to work hard and get his sisters married. Iniyan is a struggling lawyer and Aadhi wants to make it big in cinema. Prabhu is a happy-go-lucky youth, who runs an auto rickshaw. Their life takes a turn when Priya arrives in their locality. Priya gets acquainted with them. She helps them overcome their inferiority complex and succeed in their careers. Meanwhile, Aadhi develops romance with her. But the friends suffer a shock when they come to know that Priya is on the brink of death and is affected by heart problems.

== Cast ==
- Nithin Sathya as Prabhu
- Abhinay as Yuvan
- Sanjeev Venkat as Ramana
- Sathyan as Aadhi
- Chaams as Iniyan
- Karthika Mathew as Priya
- Vennira Aadai Moorthy as J. K. Raghavachari
- Manobala as Director
- Anu Mohan as Aadhi's father
- Vasu Vikram as Moneylender
- K. Rajan as Yuvan's father
- Vellai Subbaiah as Priest

== Soundtrack ==
Music was composed by E. K. Bobby and lyrics were by Vairamuthu. The audio was released on 26 August 2009 at Kamala Theatre. The songs "Megame Megame" and "Aalana Aalu" from the 1981 film were recreated for this version.

Track listing
| No. | Title | Singer(s) | Length |
|---|---|---|---|
| 1. | "Pournami" | S. P. Balasubrahmanyam |
| 2. | "Engal Kadhai" | S. P. Balasubrahmanyam |
| 3. | "Aalanalum" | Karthik |
| 4. | "Megame" | Sadhana Sargam |
| 5. | "Happy New" | Benny Dayal |
| 6. | "Chikkan" | Shankar Mahadevan |

== Critical reception ==
The Times of India wrote "It is well presented but the film still falls short of expectations. In an era of short texts and fast communication, it is a bit out of synch." Sify wrote that the film "just does not work as the basic concept and script is ancient and irrelevant today. It does not gel with the ideas and aspirations of today’s youths". The Hindu wrote, "At one end of the spectrum is a dignified story of romance, geniality, ecstasy and agony and, at the other, you find decibel-defying music, ear-stinging beats, predictable footwork and bizarre pelvic thrusts".
