= Dharsha Gupta =

Indian actress (born 1990)

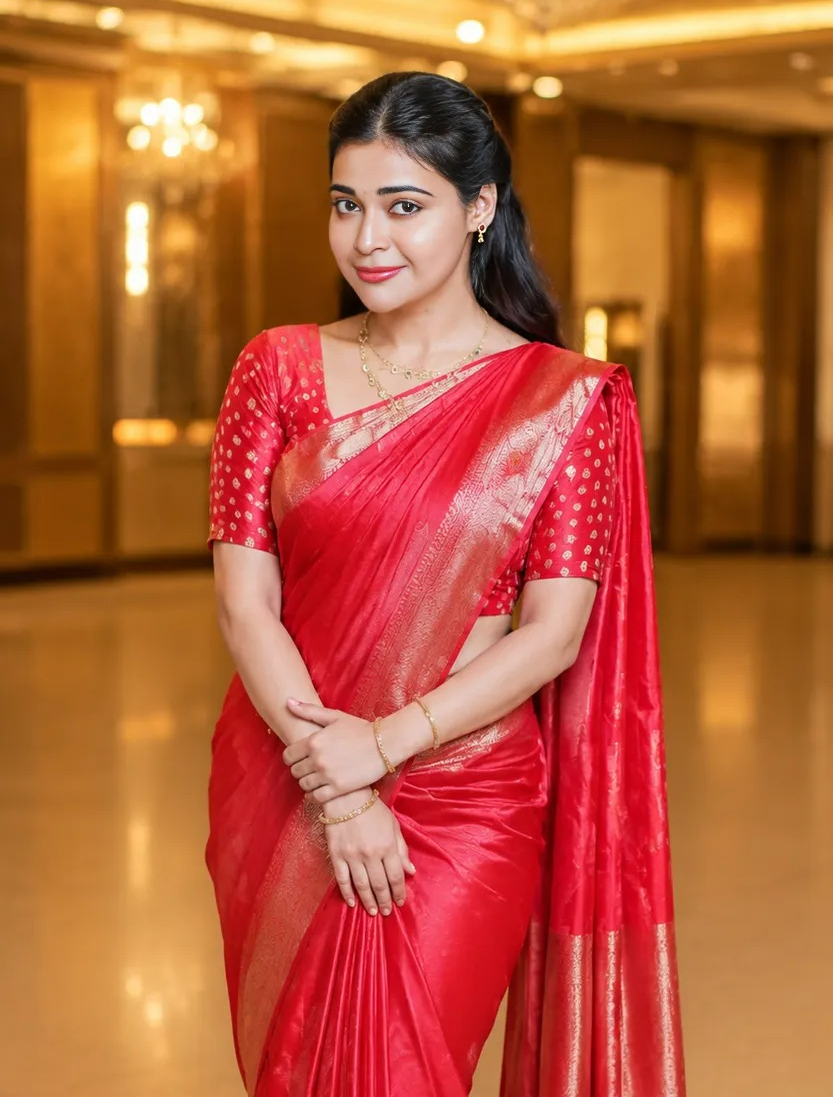
- Dharsha in 2026
- Born: Dharsha Gupta; 7 June 1990 (age 36); Udumalpet, Tamil Nadu, India
- Other name: Dharshu
- Occupations: Actress; Model
- Years active: 2017 – present
- Known for: Cooku with Comali (season 2); Bigg boss (season 8); Rudra Thandavam; Oh My Ghost

Dharsha Gupta (born 7 June 1990) is an Indian actress who predominantly appears in the Tamil film and television industry. She is best known for her roles in TV shows telecasted on Star Vijay channel the comedy reality TV show Cooku with Comali (season 2) where she rose to fame.

Gupta made her debut film with Tamil film Rudra Thandavam (2021) under the direction of director Mohan G. opposing actor Richard Rishi. In 2022 Gupta appeared in the film Oh My Ghost starring actress Sunny Leone. In 2024 she played a mass lead role in Thalaimai Seyalagam pairing with actor Bharath She participated as a contestant on the Indian reality TV show at 2025, Bigg Boss 8.

== Career ==
She made her acting debut in the Tamil television serial Mullum Malarum which aired on Zee Tamil. She also played an key important role in Senthoora Poove on Star Vijay along with Ranjith, In 2020, She appeared in the comedy reality show called Cooku with Comali (season 2) where she bagged limelight and turned out very successfully after her appearance. In the year 2021, director Mohan G. approached Dharsha offering her a role in his action thriller film Rudra Thandavam which was under his direction, she later agreed to the offer and acted in the film playing the character Varahi which also marked her first debut film as a lead actress. She later signed up another massive film titled as Medical Miracle playing the lead female tole once again, she is opposing actor and comedian Yogi Babu in the film. In 2021, she won Best Debutante Actress Of The Year in the FAB AWARD film festival. Director Abhishek Kapoor approached Dharsha offering her a supporting role in his upcoming Tamil film Oh My Ghost starring actress Sunny Leone who played the lead.

During the COVID-19 lock-down in India, Dharsha helped over 20,000 people by providing shelter and basic medical needs. She also won the award of Heart of the year after the service to the community.

In 2024, She also participated in the reality show Bigg Boss 8 hosted by Vijay Sethupathi. She was later evicted at 22nd place on day 21 of the show.

== Filmography ==
=== Television ===
==== Reality Shows ====
| Year | Show | Role | Channel | Notes |
|---|---|---|---|---|
| 2020–2021 | Cooku with Comali (season 2) | Contestant | Star Vijay | Eliminated |
| 2021 | Single Ponnunga | Herself | Star Vijay | |
| 2021 | Super Singer 8 | Guest | Star Vijay | |
| 2021 | KPY Comedy Thiruvizha | Guest | Star Vijay | |
| 2021 | Comedy Raja Kalakkal Rani | Contestant | Star Vijay | |
| 2024 | Sa Re Ga Ma Pa Seniors 4 | Guest | Zee Tamil | |
| 2024 | Bigg Boss 8 | Contestant | Star Vijay | Evicted Day 21 |

==== Serials ====
| Year | Show | Role | Channel | Notes | Ref. |
|---|---|---|---|---|---|
| 2018 | Avalum Naanum | Manasa | Star Vijay | Replaced by Suji Vasan | |
| 2017–2019 | Mullum Malarum | Vijayalakshmi | Zee Tamil | | |
| 2019–2020 | Minnale | Varsha | Sun TV | Replaced Sowmya Rao Nadig | |
| 2019–2020 | Senthoora Poove | Aishwarya | Star Vijay | Replaced by Sushma Nair | |

=== Films ===
Key
| † | Denotes films that have not yet been released |

| Year | Film | Role | Notes |
|---|---|---|---|
| 2021 | Rudra Thandavam | Varahi | |
| 2022 | Oh My Ghost | Sowmiya | |
| 2023 | Medical Miracle† | TBA | Filming |

== Awards and nominations ==
| Year | Award | Category | Work | Result | Ref. |
|---|---|---|---|---|---|
| 2021 | FAB Awards | Best Debutante Actress Of The Year | Rudra Thandavam | Won | |
