= Draupathi 2 =

2026 Tamil historical drama film

- Theatrical release poster
- Directed by: Mohan G
- Written by: Mohan G
- Dialogue by: Padma Chandrasekhar
- Produced by: Sola Shakkaravathi
- Starring: Richard Rishi; Rakshana Induchoodan; Natty Subramaniam
- Cinematography: Philip R. Sundar
- Edited by: Devaraj
- Music by: Ghibran Vaibodha
- Production companies: Netaji Productions; GM Film Corporation
- Release date: 23 January 2026
- Running time: 159 minutes
- Country: India
- Language: Tamil

Draupathi 2 is a 2026 Indian Tamil-language historical action drama film written and directed by Mohan G. A prequel to Draupathi (2020), it stars Richard Rishi in the lead role, reuniting with Mohan after Draupathi and Rudra Thandavam (2021). The film is produced jointly by Sola Shakkaravarthi under his Netaji Productions in association with GM Film Corporation. The film stars Rakshana Induchoodan in the titular role alongside Chirag Jani, Natty Subramaniam, Y. G. Mahendran, Bharani, Saravana Subbiah, Vela Ramamoorthy, Dinesh Lamba and others in important roles.

Draupathi 2 released in theatres on 23 January 2026. The film received negative reviews from critics and become a box-office bomb.

== Premise ==
Kadavarayan is a soldier aiming to protect his people and country by joining the Royal Army called as Garuda Padai. His brave acts make him earn the position and also become a king of a small area. The issues he face from non-native forces and how he handles the sources through bravery and planning is the central plot.

== Cast ==
- Richard Rishi as King Veera Simha Kadavarayan
- Rakshana Induchoodan as Draupathi Devi
- Chirag Jani as Muhammad bin Tughluq
- Natty Subramaniam as Veera Vallalar
- Y. G. Mahendran
- Bharani
- Saravana Subbiah
- Vela Ramamoorthy
- Dinesh Lamba as Ghiyasuddin Thamkani
- Ganesh Gaurang
- Divi
- Devayani Sharma
- Arunodayan

== Production ==
In February 2025, Mohan G. announced his next project titled Draupathi 2, a sequel to his 2020 film Draupathi, reuniting with Richard Rishi for the sequel, where Richard is seen playing the role of the King Veera Simha Kadavarayan. The film is jointly produced by Sola Shakkaravarthi under his Netaji Productions in association with GM Film Corporation. Rakshana Induchoodan was cast in the film to play the titular role as Draupathi Devi. Apart from the lead cast, the film also features Chirag Jani, Natty Subramaniam, Y. G. Mahendran, Bharani, Saravana Subbiah, Vela Ramamoorthy, Dinesh Lamba and others in key roles. The film has dialogues written by Mohan along with writer Padma Chandrasekhar and the technical team consists of music composer Ghibran Vaibodha, cinematographer Philip R. Sundar, editor Devaraj, art director Kamalnathan, dance choreographer Thanika Tony, and action choreographer Action Santosh. In an interview, Mohan stated that the film's story is inspired from a book called Moondram Vallalla Maharaja by Annal Kandar. Principal photography wrapped in September 2025 after completing several schedules in five months that began in Mumbai and concluded in Ariyalur.

== Music ==
Draupathi 2

Soundtrack album by Ghibran
- Studio: Akshrah Sound Lab
- Genre: Feature film soundtrack
- Language: Tamil
- Label: Lahari Music
- Producer: Ghibran

Ghibran chronology
BP 180 (2025)	Draupathi 2 (2026)	Biker (2026)

Singles from Draupathi 2
- 1. "EmKoney" Released: 1 December 2025; 2. "Tarasuki Ram" Released: 7 January 2026

External audio
- Draupathi 2 Audio Jukebox on YouTube

The film has music composed by Ghibran in his first collaboration with Mohan and Richard Rishi. The first single titled "EmKoney" sung by Chinmayi Sripada was released on 1 December 2025. The second single titled "Tarasuki Ram" released on 7 January 2026.

Chinmayi faced criticism for collaborating with Mohan, with critics saying the association conflicted with her socially conscious image, given Mohan's alleged track record of films accused of promoting casteism and honour killings. On 1 December 2025, she issued a public statement apologising for her participation, explaining that she had recorded the song without full awareness of the film's context, director, or thematic content, claiming she was approached through professional channels primarily due to her prior collaborations with Ghibran and was not informed of the project's details at the time. She stated that had she known the ideologies involved, she "would never have collaborated" as they were "at complete contradiction" to her own beliefs. She expressed regret and apologised to those offended.

Mohan responded by expressing disappointment that Chinmayi had issued her apology without prior discussion with him or the production team. He questioned the motives behind her public statement and urged her to provide further clarification. In January 2026, the makers of Draupathi 2 confirmed that Chinmayi's version of "EmKoney" would be replaced by singer Padmalatha's vocals in the final theatrical cut and that Chinmayi's contributions would be entirely removed from the film.

Track listing
No.	Title	Lyrics	Singer(s)	Length
1.	"Emkoney"	Selvamira	Padmalatha	4:18
2.	"Celebration Of Seige"	Mohan G	Ghibran, Shenbagaraj, Narayanan Ravishankar, Sudharsan Ram	2:44
3.	"Tarasuki Ram"	Mohan G.	Ghibran, Gold Devaraj, Guru Hariraj	3:19
4.	"Ram Nami"	Mohan G	Ghibran, Shenbagaraj, Narayanan Ravishankar, Sudharsan Ram	2:51
5.	"Draupathi - 2 Theme Music"	–	–	0:33
6.	"Emkoney" (reprise)	Selvamira	Chinmayi Sripada	4:18
Total length:				18:03

== Release ==
Draupathi 2 was released in theatres on 23 January 2026. Earlier it was scheduled for release in December 2025, and then was postponed to 23 January 2026. After Jana Nayagan got delayed due to censorship issues, Draupathi 2 was brought forward to 15 January 2026, during the Pongal weekend.

== Reception ==
A critic of Dinamalar gave 2.5 out of 5 stars. Abhinav Subramanian of The Times of India gave 2.5 out of 5 stars and wrote "Draupathi 2 is a passion project about regional history most viewers won't recognize. That obscurity is both its purpose and its limitation. The committed will find material worth engaging with. The rest may admire the effort from a polite distance." Akshay Kumar of Cinema Express gave 1.5 out of 5 stars and wrote "Draupathi 2 is a historically convenient and ideologically indulgent film that ends up as a dead weight of sorts." Anusha Sundar of OTTPlay gave 1.5 out of 5 stars and wrote "Positioned as a historical drama, Draupathi 2 slips relies on flat characters, crude stereotypes and weak craft, leaving its strong political stance unsupported by storytelling or technique. Neither its performances, ideology nor technical making, help make Draupathi 2 watchable." The film was also reviewed by Maalai Malar.
