= Mayuran =

2019 Indian drama film by Nandan Subbrayan

- Theatrical release poster
- Directed by: Nandan Subbrayan
- Produced by: K. Ashokkumar; P. Raman; G. Chandrasekaran; M. P. Karthick
- Starring: Anjan Dev; Ashmitha Dogra; Vela Ramamoorthy
- Cinematography: Parameshwar
- Edited by: Ignatius Ashwin
- Music by: Songs: Jerard Felix; Score: Jubin
- Production company: Pinnacle Film Studio
- Release date: 30 August 2019
- Country: India
- Language: Tamil

Mayuran is a 2019 Indian Tamil-language drama film directed by Nandan Subbrayan. It stars Anjan Dev, Asmitha Dogra and Vela Ramamoorthy in the lead roles, alongside a cast featuring predominantly newcomers. The film's soundtrack was composed by Jerard Felix, and its score was composed by Jubin. The film began production in late 2018 and was released on 30 August 2019.

== Cast ==
- Anjan Dev as Segu
- Ashmitha Dogra
- Vela Ramamoorthy as Periyavar
- Amudhavanan as Viji
- Balaji Radhakrishnan as Muthukumaran
- Anandsami
- Sashi

== Production ==
The film marked the directorial debut of Nandan Subbrayan, an erstwhile assistant of director Bala. He chose to make a film based on the theme of drug trafficking taking place in men's college hostels. The director revealed that he based parts of the story on his own experience of living in college dormitories. Rookie actor Anjan Dev was signed in the lead role, while Ashmitha, a graduate from National School of Drama who had acted in Bengali films, was selected to make her debut as the lead actress. Vela Ramamoorthy was signed to play a character with grey shades, while Balaji Radhakrishnan from theatre group Koothu-P-Pattarai and Sashi from Jharkhand were selected for other pivotal roles. The film's set in Chidambaram, and was shot in several locations, including Karaikal and Pondicherry.

== Soundtrack ==
The film's soundtrack was composed by Jerard Felix, while Jubin handled the background score.

Mayuran

Soundtrack album by Jerard Felix Background score by Jubin
- Released: 2019
- Genre: Feature film soundtrack
- Length: 8:34
- Language: Tamil
- Label: Trend Music

Jerard Felix chronology
Mayuran (2019)	Nandhi Varman (2023)

Jubin chronology
Pazhaya Vannarapettai (2016)	Mayuran (2019)	Draupathi (2020)

Track listing
No.	Title	Lyrics	Singer(s)	Length
1.	"Vanam Boomi Pola"		Sathyaprakash	4:36
2.	"Nenjellam Pookirai"	Gugai Ma Pugazhendhi	Sathyaprakash	3:58
Total length:				8:34

== Release ==
The film had a low profile opening across Tamil Nadu on 30 August 2019. In its review, The Times of India noted "Mayuran has good performances, but lacks an emotional connect and smart writing." A critic from Cinema Express wrote "inconsistent writing, unnecessary songs, convenient plot points, and a hero you can't quite root for make Mayuran a dull affair". Likewise, a reviewer from the Asian Age noted that "the film has an intriguing plot, but the problem lies with the screenplay."
