= Draupathi (2020 film) =

Tamil action drama film

- Theatrical release poster
- Directed by: Mohan G. Kshatriyan
- Written by: Mohan G. Kshatriyan
- Produced by: Mohan G. Kshatriyan
- Starring: Richard Rishi; Sheela Rajkumar; Karunas; Nishanth; Soundariya Nanjundan
- Cinematography: Manoj Narayan
- Edited by: Devaraj S.
- Music by: Jubin
- Production companies: GM Film Corporation & 7G Films
- Distributed by: Salem 7G Siva
- Release date: 28 February 2020
- Running time: 180 minutes
- Country: India
- Language: Tamil

Draupathi is a 2020 Indian Tamil-language action drama film written, directed, and produced by Mohan G. Kshatriyan. The film stars Richard Rishi and Sheela Rajkumar, with K. S. G. Venkatesh, Karunas, Nishanth and Soundariya Nanjundan in supporting roles. The music of the film was composed by Jubin and cinematography was performed by Manoj Narayan and edited by Devaraj S. The film is a crowdfunding project. The film released on 28 February 2020 to mostly negative reviews from critics.

The film was released amidst huge controversies related to casteism. The film has been criticized for its alleged pro-casteism stand and intent to uphold casteism. It was also heavily criticised for its regressive storyline.

A sequel titled Draupathi 2, also directed by Mohan G and starring Richard Rishi was announced on 26 February 2025.

== Cast ==
- Richard Rishi as Rudra Prabhakaran
- Sheela Rajkumar as Draupathi
- Karunas as Advocate Guruthevan
- Nishanth as Arun
- Nivitha deep as Lakshmi
- Soundariya Nanjundan as Raniya
- Lena as Doctor
- Lollu Sabha Seshu as Register Neela Narayanan
- Aaru Bala as Prabakar's friend
- Jeeva Ravi as Advocate
- Ambani Shankar as Bhai
- Ilango as Karuna
- Gopinath as Senji Sekar
- Marumalarchi Bharathi as Ramasamy
- G. V. Kumar as Judge
- Jayam SK Gopi as ACP Muruganandam
- Subramani
- Priya Asmitha in a special appearance for "Kanna Moochi" song

== Production ==
This film marks the second collaboration between the director Mohan.G and Richard Rishi after Pazhaya Vannarapettai (2016). The film was shot in Chennai, Vellore, Viluppuram and Ariyalur and will be set in northern Tamil Nadu. The film had to be crowdfunded as no producer was willing to produce the film, fearing it would incite controversy.

== Music ==
The soundtrack of the film was composed by Jubin, collaborating with director Mohan and actor Richard Rishi for the second time after Pazhaya Vannarapettai.

Draupathi

Soundtrack album by Jubin
- Released: 14 February 2020
- Genre: Feature film soundtrack
- Length: 7:12
- Language: Tamil
- Label: Lahari Music
- Producer: Jubin

Jubin chronology
Mayuran (2019)	Draupathi (2020)	Rudra Thandavam (2021)

Singles from Draupathi
- 1. "Kanna Moochi Aatam" Released: 9 October 2019

Track listing
No.	Title	Lyrics	Singer(s)	Length
1.	"Kanna Moochi Aatam"	Pattinathar, Mohan G	Velmurugan	3:35
2.	"Kukukukku"	Manikandan Priya	Abhay Jodhpurkar	3:37
Total length:				7:12

== Home media ==
The satellite rights of the film were sold to Star Vijay.

== Special screening ==
Puducherry Governor and BJP leader Kiran Bedi celebrated womanhood by taking her housekeeping women for the film. The film was screened to political leaders S. Ramadoss of PMK and H.Raja of BJP political parties.

== Reception ==
=== Critical reception ===
Southfans gave 2 out of 5 stars and said, "The film is made only with a single-minded narrative wherein the upper castes are shown in good light and the lower castes in a negative light."

The Wire wrote, "'Draupathi' is not blasé. It is explicit about the deepest fears whispered in intermediate caste fraternities and social media."

Film Companion called the film regressive and "Caste-porn".

Akshay Kumar of Dina Thanthi group in DTNEXT said, "Director Mohan has walked the tight-rope of a social message movie laced with casteism and almost manages to make the film un-polarized."

Priyanka Thirumurthy of The News Minute gave it 1 out of 5 stars, claiming it was almost like the film was "birthed on allegations by PMK Chief Ramadoss" who claimed Dalit men were luring Vanniyar women with "jeans, T-shirts and fancy sunglasses" back in 2012 and said it is "a vile casteist film that was better off not made".

The Indian Express Navien Darshan gave the film 1.5/5, calling it out for trying to "brainwash" what he called "a naive audience possessing a shallow idea about casteism" and called out the directors for painting a single community (Dalits) as being the organizers of the marriage racket, closing by saying "the only thing people must be separated from is such works of hatred."

The Hindu's Srinivasa Ramanujan claimed the film was "a bland outing that has very few cherishable moments," and called it "farcical" that the movie lasted 2.5 hours to show the audience a change in attitude, although he noted that the movie was not as blatantly casteist as the trailer made it out to be.

The Times of India critic M. Suganth gave it 2.5/5, claiming the first half had a "vigilante thriller" vibe and was interesting, but the second half became more about a message and the story got lost in narration.

Sify.com gave it 2/5, claiming that Draupathi is an average drama shedding light on an unknown crime in society.

Ananda Vikatan gave the film a rating of 29 marks out of 100, the magazine's lowest rating given to a film in the past 20 years.

BJP leader H. Raja and PMK leader S. Ramadoss, AIADMK Minister K. T. Rajenthra Bhalaji watched the film, and he has tweeted praising Draupadi as a good awareness movie for women and parents, and appreciated the team.

== Audience ==
If my sister falls in love with someone from a different caste, I will kill the guy or my sister.

— An audience member after watching Draupathi,

The film was received with frenzy by Pattali Makkal Katchi cadres. Banners with slogans "Here comes Draupadi to save the women of all communities," are erected in theatres in Trichy. The film found support from the PMK and BJP. PMK cadre and functionaries filled up the theatres on the opening day, in some places even posters were put up to make it clear that the film has the approval of PMK founder S. Ramadoss.

A video went viral where a young man outside a cinema theatre after watching Draupathi said "If my sister falls in love with someone from a different caste, I will kill the guy or my sister" and a group of men cheer him on as if he's just made a revolutionary statement.

Many Vanniyars, as well as members of social groupings who share the film's cultural anxieties, have praised it. The film was also lauded by Bharatiya Janata Party (BJP) politician H. Raja. While numerous films in Tamil cinema praise the Thevars and Gounders, as well as the Brahmins, the Vanniyars have been virtually ignored. For Vanniyar zealots, this is a watershed event since, after Marumalarchi (1998), Draupathi is the first film to overtly represent Vanniyars as assertive.

== Allegations of casteism ==
Social activists and rationalists claimed that the film is speaking in favor of caste and is supporting honor killing.

According to assistant professor of political science at the Centre for Studies in Social Sciences, Calcutta, Karthick Ram Manoharan, the villain of the film is a political leader who and his henchmen are involved in the fake marriage racket. Some commentators say it resembles the prominent Dalit leader Thol. Thirumavalavan, though Mohan has denied this. In the film, Draupathi's uncle advises that if Dalits enter the village, they should be thrashed. The film employs a slew of confusing connections to obscure its casteist plot and portrays all Dalit men as lechers and prone to criminal activities. The film makes a vague reference to the Ilavarasan case and calls it a fake incident orchestrated by Dalits and that the honor killings in general are actually premeditated suicides plotted by Dalit political outfits who gain political mileage through such incidents. The film shows corporates using Dalits, who are depicted unscrupulous right from their birth in the film, to subvert traditional lifestyle and values and that the Dalits have no dignity and respectable traditions. The fake marriage racket is shown as a means to break the caste hierarchy and it is frequently cited in film that the caste system is good and that the most we can aspire is to lessen violence while maintaining caste hierarchy, endogamy, ban on Dalits to enter certain temples, separate neighborhoods for Dalits and kangaroo courts that punish Dalits violently for transgressing rules imposed by other castes . According to Manoharan, this portrayal reflects fear, or what M.S.S. Pandian refers to as the "falling dominance of intermediary castes," or the difficulty of such castes to accept Dalit mobility. Mohan portrays the Vanniyars as people with royal lineage, who are righteous by birth and honor both women(penn) and the land(mann), while Dalits as traitors and antisocial elements who were ostracized because of their supposed innate immoral nature. Female characters are portrayed mostly submissive to the patriarchy.

For us, both land and women are important... We will kill anyone who touches them.

— A quote from the film,

According to Film Companion, the film depicts endogamy is the ideal marriage while inter-caste marriage, although undesirable and better be avoided, should only be approved if it happens between members of non-Dalit castes. The film shows women who date Dalit men in poor light and shows them as gullible, easy to have sex with while the women practicing endogamy are portrayed to be wiser, chaste and brave. Apart from vilifying lower castes, it also vilifies Brahmins and foreign corporates who collude with lower castes for economic gain. Dalit men are shown as lecherous, lazy and drug addicts who try to date Vanniyar women to improve their social-economic status. In one scene, Draupathi is shown walking through fields and criticizing the MNREGA program for making landless Dalit men lazy and asserting that Panchami land given to Dalits should be appropriated by upper castes . Marriage between Dalit men and non-Dalit women is frequently cited as the most serious problem faced by intermediary castes. The Brahmin registrar is said to have performed 3200 fake marriages. However, the film makes no mention of how the same system could have endorsed real lovers from different castes.

India Today reported that Mohan G believes that many cases of honour killings are false, and this belief is expressed explicitly in some scenes and dialogues.

=== Influence of Vanniyar Sangham ===
The film contains enough symbolic representations to indicate that the plot revolves around the Vanniyar community. A character has a ring tone that plays the song 'Maaveeraney,' which caused an uproar in the theatre. The supporters of late Vanniyar Sangam leader Kaduvetti Guru referred to him as Maaveeran. Furthermore, several young people in the film are seen wearing yellow t-shirts with Vanniyar Sangham symbols.

== Controversy ==
The trailer of the film, which was released with the caption "Jaathigal ulathadi paapa" (transl. Caste exists, my child), created a controversy in Tamil Nadu. The scenes in the trailer are designed to justify manslaughter. The verses where Karunas says "Kill whoever you want, soil and women are very important to us", and the verse in which Susila says, "We will cut off the hand of anyone who touches it" became controversy. Many who commented below the trailer openly mentioned their caste name and said, "Congratulations on the success of the film on behalf of our caste" as well as depicting certain castes as inferior to them.

The film's trailer has drawn a lot of criticism for portraying Thol. Thirumavalavan, the founder of Viduthalai Chiruthaigal Katchi, as the leader of the "fake love" racket and for including provocative statements against inter-caste marriage. In the film, an allegedly criminal character claims that their commander instructed him to chant "Adanga Maru, Aththu Meeru," a political slogan popularised by Thirumavalavan. The similarities between the figure in the film and real-life politicians, on the other hand, were unintentional, according to Mohan G Kshatriyan.
