= ABCD (film) =

- DVD cover
- Directed by: Saravana Subbaiya
- Written by: Saravana Subbaiya
- Produced by: R Saravanan
- Starring: Shaam; Nandana; Sneha; Aparna
- Cinematography: Rajarathnam
- Edited by: V. T. Vijayan
- Music by: D. Imman
- Distributed by: OST Films Pte Ltd
- Release date: 12 August 2005
- Country: India
- Language: Tamil

ABCD is a 2005 Indian Tamil-language romance film written and directed by Saravana Subbiah. The film stars Shaam, Nandana, Sneha, and Aparna. It was released on 12 August 2005.

== Plot ==
Anand(Shaam), an MBA Chartered Accountant graduate, runs in search of a job in Chennai. He stays in the house of an old man, whose daughter Chandra returned home following the death of her husband, who had been mistreating and abusing her since their wedding. She slowly gets attracted to Anand, as he is polite and humble, the characteristics missing from her husband.

Meanwhile, while travelling in a bus, he meets a woman named Bharati(Nandhana Kumar), whom he lost his academic certificates to. Bharati is a revolutionary woman with practical ideas and looks after her whole family. She has even canceled her wedding, as the groom expects a lumpsum amount as a dowry. When Bharati helps Anand find his certificates, they become friends, and Bharati starts developing feelings for him.

Anand also comes across Divya Daisy(Aparna), an orphaned girl brought up by a church who finds a job and settles in life all out of her own efforts. Anand rescues her after an accident and rushes her to a hospital. Over time, they become close friends, eventually leading to Divya opening her heart to Anand.

Parallel narration is the comedy track of (Vadivelu), a conductor of a bus where Anand and Bharati meet often.

At a point, Bharathi expressed her love for him. But Anand refuses to accept it as he considers Bharati as his true friend. Just like Bharati, Divya Daisy also confronted her love for Anand with him, as she was attracted by his good qualities. But Anand refuses to accept this proposal too, and makes her understand that helping her at the accident was an act of humanity. Anand clarifies that he was in love with Chandra. Anand unites with Chandra, and he wants to give her a peaceful life through this marriage when her first marriage was an unsuccessful one.

== Cast ==
- Shaam as Anand
- Nandhana Kumar as Bharathi
- Sneha as Chandra
- Aparna as Divya Daisy
- Vadivelu as Bus Conductor
- Saravana Subbiah as Chandra's husband
- Kudanthai Subbiah as Chandra's father
- Madhan Bob as Anand's uncle
- Aravind Akash as Christopher
- Crane Manohar as a thief at temple
- Kuyili as Chandra's neighbour
- Rajni Nivetha as Bharati's mother
- Swetha Bharathi as Bharati's sister
- Sriranjani as a church mother
- Singamuthu as a bus passenger
- Halwa Vasu as a suicidal man
- Bonda Mani as Nagaraju's caretaker
- Bava Lakshmanan as a bus passenger
- Vengal Rao as a dead bus passenger
- Amirthalingam as a bus driver

Uncredited

- Appukutty as a bus passenger
- Citizen Mani as a bus passenger
- Vijay Ganesh as Nayantara's husband

== Production ==
After his directorial debut Citizen (2001), Saravana Subbiah announced that his next film would be titled ABCDE, starring Shaam. The "E" stood for Eashwari, but the character was later removed, and the title was shortened to ABCD. The letters stand for the main characters of the film. ABCD continues the trend of casting three heroines opposite the hero that started with Autograph and would continue with Vallavan. Shaam found it difficult to portray a mature man in the film, saying he was a "very energetic, active guy" like in his earlier films.

== Soundtrack ==
The soundtrack was composed by D. Imman.

| Song | Singers | Lyrics |
|---|---|---|
| "Anandin Arimugam" | D. Imman | Pa. Vijay |
| "Bharathiyin Arimugam" | D. Imman | Pa. Vijay |
| "Chandravin Arimugam" | D. Imman | Pa. Vijay |
| "Divyavin Arimugam" | D. Imman | Pa. Vijay |
| "Dhavam Ondru" | Nithyasree Mahadevan, Balram | Thamarai |
| "Kadhal Illai" | Imman | Saravana Subbiah |
| "Manjal Mugame" | Saindhavi | Saravana Subbiah |
| "Yengo Yengo" | Mahathi, Haricharan | Saravana Subbiah |
| "Yaar Potta Kolam" | Karthik | Na. Muthukumar |

== Release and reception ==
The film was released on 25 November 2005, shortly after Shaam's successful Ullam Ketkumae. A critic from Sify wrote: "If you like a mixture of romance, mush and melodrama then ABCD is on your priority list". A critic from The Hindu opined that the film was "A love story decently told". Malini Mannath of Chennai Online opined that "ABCD is a film that sincerely attempts to break away from the routine fare, simple, unpretentious and straight from the heart". Lajjavathi of Kalki praised the acting of Sneha, Imman's music, art, cinematography and called Vadivelu's humour as relief but panned Shaam's acting and concluded even if the A to Z of the screenplay is not to be appreciated, one cannot help but appreciate the heartwarming story and characters. Screen wrote, "The film’s strength is the characterisation of the four main protagonists and the sensitivity with which he has depicted the relationships. The intrusions of songs and a fight, the drawn out climax and the sudden entry and exit of Anand’s uncle mars the tempo of the film. Many of the scenes remind one of K Balchander’s films".

== Accolades ==
| Event | Category | Awardee | Ref. |
|---|---|---|---|
| All India Radio – Kodai FM's Film Star Awards | Special Award for Direction | Saravana Subbiah | |
| All India Radio – Kodai FM's Film Star Awards | Best Actress | Sneha | |
