= Vela Ramamoorthy =

Indian writer and actor

- Born: 1 February 1956 (age 70); Perunali, Kamuthi, Ramanathapuram, Tamil Nadu, India
- Other name: vela sir
- Occupations: Actor; Writer; Theatre director
- Spouse: Kaliammal
- Parent: Velusamy Thevar (Veyanna)

Vela Ramamoorthy is an Indian writer and actor who has appeared in Tamil language films. Before coming to the film industry, he worked as a district coordinator for Arivoli Iyakkam, a government special program for giving education and knowledge to the Tamil community for several years. He wrote several stage drama scripts and created a drama and cultural group named Karvaikattu Kalaikkuzu.

== Career ==
Ramamoorthy is a PUC Graduate. He joined the Indian Army and served for five years before being posted in Post office. Since he is a writer, many people would come to meet him in his office.

Ramamoorthy has written acclaimed Tamil novels including Kuttra Parambarai, Kuruthi Aattam, Pattathu Yaanai and is considered one of the leading Tamil story writers of his time. He was also involved in the dispute regarding the rights of making a film out of Kuttra Parambarai. He had supported Bala's project ahead of Bharathiraja's. He has also written the book Vela Ramamoorthy Kathaikal which is a compilation of short stories.

== Filmography ==
=== Films ===
| Year | Film | Role | Notes |
|---|---|---|---|
| 2008 | Aayudham Seivom | Inspector | Uncredited role |
| 2013 | Madha Yaanai Koottam | Veera Thevar | |
| 2015 | Komban | Duraipandi | |
| 2015 | Paayum Puli | Jayaseelan's father | |
| 2016 | Rajini Murugan | Chellakaruppan | |
| 2016 | Sethupathi | Vathiyar | |
| 2016 | Appa | Dhayalan's Father in law | |
| 2016 | Kidaari | Kombiah | Best Villain award from Vikatan Magazine |
| 2017 | Yeidhavan | Krishna's Father | |
| 2017 | Vanamagan | Jara's Father | |
| 2017 | Thondan | Vishnu and Mahi's Father | |
| 2017 | Aramm | MLA | |
| 2017 | Veeraiyan | Devarajan | |
| 2018 | Sketch | Jeeva's father | |
| 2018 | Gulaebaghavali | Village Head | |
| 2018 | Madura Veeran | Gurumoorthy | |
| 2018 | Kaali | Gounder | |
| 2018 | Thuppakki Munai | Brahmaraja | |
| 2019 | Mehandi Circus | Amaladass | |
| 2019 | Devarattam | Kalyani Thevar | |
| 2019 | NGK | Ramamoorthy | |
| 2019 | Mayuran | Periyavar | |
| 2019 | Namma Veettu Pillai | Maniyakkarar | |
| 2019 | Enai Noki Paayum Thota | Raghu's father | |
| 2020 | Utraan | VVK | |
| 2020 | Danny | Chidambaram | Released on ZEE5 |
| 2020 | Ka Pae Ranasingam | Tirukannan, Ariyanachi's father | |
| 2021 | Pulikkuthi Pandi | Sannasi Thevar | |
| 2021 | Kalathil Santhippom | Kavya's father | |
| 2021 | Paramapadham Vilayattu | Chezhiyan | |
| 2021 | Aranmanai 3 | Saamiyaadi | |
| 2021 | Udanpirappe | Maathangi and Vairavan's cousin | |
| 2021 | Annaatthe | Kalaiyaan’s uncle | |
| 2021 | Vanam | | |
| 2022 | Etharkkum Thunindhavan | Kaverinandan | |
| 2022 | Nadhi | | |
| 2022 | Naai Sekar Returns | Natarajan | |
| 2022 | Therkathi Veeran | | |
| 2023 | Deiva Machan | Saattaikkaran | |
| 2023 | Paayum Oli Nee Yenakku | Aanamalaiyar | |
| 2023 | Vivasayi Ennum Naan | | |
| 2023 | Tamil Kudimagan | Gandhi | |
| 2023 | 800 | Muthiah | |
| 2023 | The Road | Chinnaswamy | |
| 2024 | Oru Nodi | Karimedu Thyagu | |
| 2024 | Veerayi Makkal | Maruthamuthu | |
| 2024 | Pogumidam Vegu Thooramillai | a jamin | |
| 2024 | Little Jaffna | Ayya | |
| 2025 | Good Day | Bairava Moorthy | |
| 2025 | Jenma Natchathiram | MLA Velayudham | |
| 2025 | Veerathamizhachi | | |
| 2025 | Middle Class | Sivapunniyam | |
| 2025 | Theeyavar Kulai Nadunga | Chandrasekhar | |
| 2025 | Aaryan | Minister Ashok | |
| 2025 | Galatta Family | Chella Pandian | |
| 2026 | Draupathi 2 | | |
| 2026 | Vasool Mannan | | |
| 2026 | Kara | Police commissioner | |
| 2026 | Karuppu | Minister V. M. Pandian | |
| 2026 | Photographer | | |
| 2026 | Singgaramm | | |

=== Television ===
| Year | Program Name | Role | Network | Ref. |
|---|---|---|---|---|
| 2022 | Pettaikaali | Selvasekaran | Aha Tamil | |
| 2023 | Sengalam | Ganesamoorthy | ZEE5 | |
| 2023–2024 | Ethirneechal | Aadhi Gunasekaran | Sun TV | |
| 2024 | Inspector Rishi | Kaliaperumal | Amazon Prime Video | |
| 2024–Present | Ethirneechal Thodargiradhu | Aadhi Gunasekaran | Sun TV | |
