= Citizen Mani =

Indian actor

- Born: Mani
- Occupations: Comedian; director
- Years active: 1994–present

Citizen Mani is an Indian actor who works in Tamil-language films. He has acted in 200 films and television serials. He directed and acted in a film, Perunali, in 2019.

== Career ==
Mani left his village for Chennai to pursue a career in acting. He played a role as a tea master in Citizen (2001). After the film's success, Mani added the moniker 'Citizen' to his stage name. Citizen enabled him to get comedic roles in several films including Anniyan (2005) and Aaru (2005). He made his directorial debut with Perunali (2019).

== Partial filmography ==
Uncredited role

- Mahanadhi (1994)
- Aranmanai Kaavalan (1994)
- Citizen (2001)
- Anniyan (2005)
- ABCD (2005)
- Thambikku Indha Ooru (2010)

Credited roles

- 12B (2001)
- Thavasi (2001)
- Devan (2002)
- Shree (2002)
- Bagavathi (2002)
- Villain (2002)
- Bheeshmar (2003)
- Ji (2005)
- Daas (2005)
- Aanai (2005)
- Aaru (2005)
- Kurukshetram (2006)
- Sengathu (2006)
- Maranthen Meimaranthen (2006)
- Thaamirabharani (2007)
- Muni (2007)
- Urchagam (2007)
- Ellam Avan Seyal (2008)
- Durai (2008)
- Kanthaswamy (2009)
- Thunichal (2010)
- Maanja Velu (2010)
- Vallakottai (2010)
- Singam II (2013)
- Sevili (2017)
- Hara Hara Mahadevaki (2017)
- Aadai (2019)
- Perunali (2019; also director)
- Paramapadham Vilayattu (2021)
