= Avatharam (2014 Telugu film) =

- Theatrical release poster
- Directed by: Kodi Ramakrishna
- Written by: P Rajendra Kumar
- Screenplay by: Kodi Ramakrishna
- Story by: Kodi Ramakrishna
- Produced by: M. Yugander Reddy
- Starring: Radhika Kumaraswamy; Bhanupriya; Rishi
- Cinematography: Sri Venkat
- Edited by: Nandamuri Hari
- Music by: Ghantadi Krishna
- Release date: 18 April 2014
- Country: India
- Language: Telugu
- Budget: INR 80,000,000 (estimated)

Avatharam (transl. Incarnation) is a 2014 Indian Telugu-language fantasy film written and directed by Kodi Ramakrishna. The film stars Radhika Kumaraswamy, Bhanupriya, and Rishi, while Satya Prakash, Prudhvi Raj, and Annapoorna play supporting roles. The music was composed by Ghantadi Krishna.

The film is about the Simha Rashi people and how Goddess Akkamma defeated a monster from another world. The movie released on 18 April 2014. It released in Tamil under the name Meendum Amman and in Hindi as The Power Avatharam. The film was Kodi Ramakrishna's final Telugu film before his death in 2019.

== Plot ==
Rajeshwari is a girl born under the Simha Rashi Zodiac sign who has divine faith in Goddess Akkamma. Meanwhile, Karkotakudu, a demon, lands on Earth to destroy it. The film's backstory shows that to protect the world, Akkamma must herself go under the arrest of a supernatural element, which can only be uplifted when a person born under the Simha Rashi zodiac sign sacrifices herself in fire. It is revealed that Karkotakudu can be killed by Rajeshwari, so Karkotakudu tries multiple attempts to kill Rajeshwari.

In the process, Rajeshwari marries Prasad, the heir of a wealthy family who treats him badly and drugs him to make him mentally unstable to capture his wealth. Rajeshwari's divinity increases, and she also saves her husband from his family's evil deeds. After some time, Rajeshwari becomes a mother. Now Karkotakudu, with all his force, tries to kill Rajeshwari one last time. Akkamma comes in human form to Rajeshwari's rescue. In a series of events, Prasad wrongly suffers from sarpa-matsya dosha, which Rajeshwari finally eradicates with Akkamma's help. Her child is forcibly killed, after which the evil family misleads the villagers that Rajeshwari herself killed the child. Karkotakudu influences Prasad's family that Rajeshwari is bad luck and must be thrown out. The family then throws Rajeshwari out of the house.

Meanwhile, the time comes when Akkamma must go under arrest under supernatural powers to maintain the balance of the universe. Then, Karkotakudu attacks Prasad, but Rajeshwari's pure faith and the power of a wife's love (through haldi and kumkuma) save Prasad. However, Prasad's family members, under Karkotakudu's influence, remove the kumkuma and mangalsutra away from Rajeshwari and make her wear white clothes. This makes Rajeshwari symbolize a widow, although her husband is not dead.

Finally, Rajeshwari, heartbroken, falsely ill-reputed, and nowhere to go, takes shelter in Akkamma's temple. Karkotakudu arrives to kill Rajeshwari one final time. Unfortunately, Akkamma, being under arrest, could not help her this time. She could only be free when a Simha Rashi sacrifices itself. Rajeshwari, tired of all bad things happening to her, jumps into the fire before Akkamma to commit suicide. As Rajeshwari was born under the Simha Rashi zodiac sign, Karkotakudu thinks this might free Akkamma, and she might kill him. Karkotakudu, with his powers, collects the knowledge that supernatural powers do not accept a widow's sacrifice, and Rajeshwari at that time was symbolized as a widow. To symbolize Rajeshwari back as a married woman, other goddesses donate materials like kumkuma, mangalsutra, red sari, jasmine flowers, rings, kohl, toe rings, necklaces, and bangles, which will symbolize Rajeshwari back as a married woman.

Finally, the sacrifice works, and the arrest breaks off. With Akkamma's blessings and parabrahma, a divine energy forms inside the fire, and Rajeshwari transforms into Goddess Narasimhi (female shakti of Narasimha) . She kills Karkotakudu with her mega divine superpowers, and everything finally returns to normal, with Rajeshwari returning to normal human form. Akkamma appears and reveals that her child is not dead and that she took care of him when he was forcibly sacrificed. She returns the child and leaves. Prasad comes, with his mental health recovered, and they leave happily ever after. The film ends with the message Jai Mata Di (transl. Hail the mother goddess).

== Cast ==
- Radhika Kumaraswamy as Rajeshwari, Prasad's wife
- Bhanupriya as Goddess Akkamma
- Rishi as Prasad, Rajeshwari's husband
- Satya Prakash as Karkotakudu
- Prudhvi Raj
- Annapoorna

== Soundtrack ==
The soundtrack was composed by Ghantadi Krishna.

All lyrics are written by Jonnavitthula.

No.	Title	Singer(s)	Length
1.	"Vevela Jejelive"	K. S. Chithra	5:18
2.	"Nalugu Dhikkula"	K. S. Chithra	5:18
3.	"Vibhranthi Golupu"	S. P. Balasubrahmanyam	0:55
4.	"Padhunalgulokalu"	Reena	1:00
5.	"Mruthyunjayeswarini"	S. P. Balasubrahmanyam	0:54
6.	"Kaduputeepini Kannathalliye"	S. P. Balasubrahmanyam	1:24
7.	"Mabbulo Voorege"	Malavika, Ghantadi Krishna	4:52
8.	"Sowbhagyadevike"	S. P. Balasubrahmanyam	6:52
Total length:			26:33

== Reception ==
The film was released to mixed-to-positive reviews with one critic noting, "Kannada actress Radhika dominates as Rajeswari, she delivers an accomplished performance as Bhavani. While the character is a bit slur at times, she has a back bone so there is ample range for the actress to do more than look attractive".
