= Oh My Ghost (film) =

2022 horror comedy film

- Theatrical release poster
- Directed by: R. Yuvan
- Produced by: D. Veera Sakthi; K. Sasikumar
- Starring: Sunny Leone; Sathish; Dharsha Gupta
- Cinematography: Deepak D. Menon
- Edited by: Ramesh Bharathi
- Music by: Javed Riaz
- Production companies: VAU Media Entertainment; White Horse Studios
- Release date: 30 December 2022
- Country: India
- Language: Tamil
- Budget: 10 Crores
- Box office: 14 crores (including overseas)

Oh My Ghost is a 2022 Indian Tamil-language horror comedy film directed by R. Yuvan and starring Sunny Leone, Sathish and Dharsha Gupta in the lead roles. It was released on 30 December 2022.

== Plot ==
Bharathi (Sathish) is an aspiring adult filmmaker. Trouble begins when he and his friend, Ramesh Thilak, inadvertently invite a ghost into their home while inebriated. Bharathi discovers that the only way to resolve this issue is by visiting a haunted bungalow in a nearby village. He takes his girlfriend, Sowmya (Dharsha Gupta), to the bungalow that once belonged to Mayasena (Sunny Leone), a powerful queen who lived many centuries ago.

== Cast ==
- Sunny Leone as Mayasena
- Sathish as A. Bharathi
- Dharsha Gupta as Sowmya
- Ramesh Thilak as Cameraman
- Yogi Babu in dual role as Rajaguru and Rajaguru's father Jalsa sathish
- Anand Kale as King - Mayasena's Father
- Arjunan as Pushpa
- KPY Thangadurai as Villager-Anacondapuram
- Rajendran as Flute Saamiyar
- Ravi Mariya as Sher khan
- KPY Bala as Witchcraft
- Kalki
- Supergood Subramani as Producer's Agent
- GP Muthu as Dr.Kunjango

== Production ==
Mia Khalifa was offered to do the Mayasena Character but due to communication issues and "adjustments with the director" she wasn't doing the role. Then they asked Sunny Leone for the role and she ultimately accepted the lead role in the magnum opus. Production for the film began in mid-2021, with a 20-day schedule in Chennai and a further 20-day schedule in Mumbai held. The shoot of the film was completed by December 2021.

During the film's audio release event, Sathish's comments on the attire of his co-host Dharsha Gupta received criticism, after he had compared her outfit of that to a more conservative outfit worn by Sunny Leone. Sathish later tried to imply that Gupta had asked him to make a comment, which the actress denied, prompting Sathish to take back his second statement.

== Reception ==
The film was released on 30 December 2022 across Tamil Nadu.A critic from The Times of India noted the film was "neither frightening nor amusing", adding "we are forced to sit through it with a flat-face as none of the scenes invoke any kind of emotion". A reviewer from Cinema Express wrote the film was "packed to the brim with bad writing and bland acting".
