= Achamindri =

2016 Indian film by P. Rajapandi

- Theatrical release poster
- Directed by: P. Rajapandi
- Produced by: V. Vinoth Kumar
- Starring: Vijay Vasanth; Samuthirakani; Srushti Dange; Vidya Pradeep; Saranya Ponvannan; Radha Ravi
- Cinematography: A. Venkatesh
- Edited by: Praveen K. L.
- Music by: Premgi Amaren
- Production company: Triple V Records
- Release date: 30 December 2016
- Running time: 117 minutes
- Country: India
- Language: Tamil

Achamindri (transl. Without fear) is a 2016 Indian Tamil language action thriller film directed by Rajapandi. It stars Vijay Vasanth, Samuthirakani, Srushti Dange, Vidya Pradeep, Saranya Ponvannan, and Radha Ravi. The music has been composed by Premgi Amaren. This film mostly includes the cast and crew from the director's previous film Ennamo Nadakkudhu (2014). It was released on 30 December 2016.

== Plot ==
A pickpocket named Sakthi is attracted to Malarvizhi, a middle-class girl. A straightforward cop named Sathya is about to marry his childhood sweetheart Shruti. Their lives turn topsy-turvy on the same day – Sakthi is chased by goons for picking the pocket of a gangster; Malar is threatened by the education minister's PA, Kathir, for filing for a reevaluation on behalf of her maid's daughter; and Sathya is attacked by his own friend and cop Saravanan, as he starts digging into Shruti's death. The movie ends with how Sakthi and Sathya solve the crime.

== Cast ==
- Vijay Vasanth as Sakthi
- Samuthirakani as Inspector Sathya
- Srushti Dange as Malarvizhi
- Vidya Pradeep as Shruthi
- Saranya Ponvannan as Rajalakshmi
- Radha Ravi as Education Minister Karikalan
- Rohini as Lawyer Tamizh Selvi
- Karunas as Pattu, Sakthi's friend
- Devadarshini as Chellam, Sakthi's sister
- Bharath Reddy as AC Saravanan
- Jayakumar as Kathir, Minister's PA
- Thalaivasal Vijay as Collector
- Ashvin Raja as Thirumaal
- Shanmugasundaram as Varaprasadam (Pattu's father)

== Soundtrack ==
Music was composed by Premji Amaren.

All lyrics are written by Yugabharathi.

Track listing
No.	Title	Singer(s)	Length
1.	"Achamindri Theme" (Instrumental)	Premji Amaren	2:28
2.	"Kasu Kaiyula"	Manikka Vinayagam, Naveen, Senthil, Hemambika	4:21
3.	"Pappa Pappa"	Karthik, Ramya NSK	3:33
4.	"Thavivarum Azhai Kadal"	Vijay Yesudas	2:53
5.	"Unna Parthathala"	Abhilash, M. M. Manasi	3:54
Total length:			17:09

== Reception ==
Sify gave an above average verdict and stated, "Achamindri is an above average commercial entertainer highlighting the irregularities in our educational system". M Suganth of The Times of India gave 3 out of 5 stars and wrote, "The climax is built chiefly on the strength of the dialogues, and G Radhakrishnan’s lines, though they make arguments that we have heard before (like the government running liquor shops instead of schools), are both hard-hitting and crowd-pleasing that we cannot help but cheer". Dinamalar in its review stated that Achamindri is a must watch for students, parents and educational institutions. Vishal Menon of The Hindu gave negative feedback for the film, criticizing the screenplay.
