= Bakasuran =

2023 film directed by Mohan.G

- Poster
- Directed by: Mohan G.
- Written by: Mohan G.
- Produced by: Mohan G.
- Starring: Selvaraghavan; Natty
- Cinematography: Farook J. Basha
- Edited by: Devaraj S.
- Music by: Sam C. S.
- Production company: G M Film Corporation
- Release date: 17 February 2023
- Country: India
- Language: Tamil

Bakasuran (transl. Bakasura) is a 2023 Indian Tamil-language vigilante action drama film written and directed by Mohan G. The film stars Selvaraghavan and Natty Subramaniam in the lead roles along with Radha Ravi, K. Rajan, and Mansoor Ali Khan in other pivotal roles. It follows a retired major who uncovers a dangerous syndicate running a prostitution ring while investigating his niece's suicide, and a street performer who embarks on a killing spree driven by a quest for justice and a personal vendetta.

The music was composed by Sam C. S. with editing by Devaraj S and cinematography by Farook J. Basha. The film was released on 17 February 2023.

== Plot ==
A car drives through a forest. A professor and a young girl exit the vehicle, and the man takes her to an abandoned house, requesting that she remove her clothes so he can have sex with her. However, the girl begs to leave. Bheemarasu arrives; he beats up the man, kills him by smashing his head with a boulder, and impales him.

Arulvarman is a retired major living in Salem who posts crime investigations on YouTube. Bheemarasu requests a woman to eat at her house, claiming he is a vagabond. She says that she will call him and serve a feast next Ammavasai. Varma's friend Guna gets a call that Varma's niece Ramya has hanged herself and gets upset.

Bheemarasu meets with the assistant of a philanthropist, Dr MR Nagarajan, to get a job, and he tells Bheemarasu to visit his house. Varma looks at Ramya's phone and WhatsApp messages and suspects a conspiracy that Ramya worked as a prostitute. She received a threatening voice message from someone. Bheemarasu visits the assistant's house and helps with cleaning. Bheemarasu helps solve a problem for his daughter, and Nagarajan's assistant thanks him. Varma queries two men, which leads him to a lady named Swetha, who introduces Ramya to the online prostitution business. Bheemarasu meets with a lady called Sundari to organise a young female escort, but she insults him. Bheemarasu laments to Shivalingam, and the woman organises a feast for Bheemarasu.

Swetha reveals that Ramya befriended a guy. The boy's greed coerced her into virtual prostitution. Ramya tried to leave the process, but they threatened to leak a video. It left her no choice but to hang herself. After eating in the woman's home, Bheemarasu locks the door and beats her watchman spouse. He then uses a wooden log to kill him and steals his chain. Bheemarasu pays ₹20,000 to Sundari for a virgin girl, and she tells him to meet her at her house after he says he will reveal Sundari's pimp background to the police. Sundari organises a young escort, but eventually, Bheemarasu hangs Sundari upside down and slits her throat.

Varma fails to convince his brother to file an FIR since they do not want to be ashamed that their daughter is a prostitute. In response to the death of their child, Varma searches for a father. He discovers Bheemarasu, who seeks justice for his daughter's mysterious death. Varma and Bheemarasu both go on a bus trip without knowing each other. Varma visits Bheemarasu's house, where he inquires with Bheemarasu's father about Bheemarasu's daughter Divya, who narrates a flashback.

Past: Two years ago, Rajasekar, alias Bheemarasu, lived happily with his father and daughter in Thiyagavalli village, Cuddalore. He becomes pleased after Divya graduates. Two months after Divya's graduation, she travels to Perambalur to study for her master's degree. 18 months later, Divya's classmate Kathir goes to Bheemarasu's house. Divya says that Kathir likes her and wants to marry her. One day, Divya comes home crying and explains what happened to her father. The watchman, Mani, takes her gold chain after he shows Divya an intimate video of Kathir and Divya kissing. A professor named Chakravathy sexually assaults her later, and the hostel warden, Sundari, threatens to leak the video if she does not obey her. However, before her final exams, Bheemarasu discovers that his daughter has committed suicide by consuming poison.

Present: Varma questions the lawyer and police inspector and finds that someone murdered the three people. All murders link to the way King Bhima murdered three demons in Mahabharatha. He meets with Kathir, who tells him that Divya's father was the murderer, and the college correspondent will be the next victim. The college correspondent forced her to have sex with him to avoid her dismissal and the video leakage. She records a video of him and shows it to Beemarasu.

Arulvarman released the video online. It sparks outrage among the students, and Varma gets 30 days to retrieve evidence from the court judge. In Pondicherry, Nagarajan arrives. Later, Beemarasu hits his goons. He reveals his background to Nagarajan, stabs him repeatedly, and shoots him. Varma meets Beemarasu and admires him. Beemarasu says parents should know about their children's phone activity, and Varma explains this through a video.

== Cast ==
- Selvaraghavan as Beemarasu / Rajasekaran
- Natty Subramaniam as Major Arulvarman / Varma
- Radha Ravi as Dr. MR Natarajan
- Tarakshi as Divya, Beemarasu's daughter
- K. Rajan as Beemarasu's father and Divya's grandfather
- Mansoor Ali Khan (Cameo Appearance)
- D. G. Gunanidhi as Kathir, Divya's love interest
- Lavanya Manickam as Ramya, Varma's niece
- Devadarshini as Inspector Radhika
- Ramachandran Durairaj as Mani, girl's hostel watchman
- P. L. Thenappan as Assistant Commissioner K. Velayutham
- Saravana Subbiah as Natarajan's lawyer
- Sasi Laya as Sundari, hostel warden and main pimp
- Jayam SK Gopi as Debate Participant
- Cool Suresh as Cool Raja, pimp
- Pondy Ravi as Natty's assistant/driver
- Marumalarchi Bharathi as Judge
- Kutty Gopi as Guna, Arulvarman's assistant
- Arunodhayan as Kandha

== Production ==
The film's director Mohan G. revealed that Bakasuran was based on real-life incidents that he came across in life. Production began on the film in December 2021, with Selvaraghavan announced as the lead actor. The first look poster of the film was released on 26 August 2022.

== Music ==
The music of the film is composed by Sam C. S. The first single titled Siva Sivaayam was released on 21 September 2022. The second single titled "Kaathama" was released on 17 October 2022.

Track listing
No.	Title	Lyrics	Singer(s)	Length
1.	"Siva Sivaayam"	Papanasam sivan, Thiruvasagam	Sam C. S.	4:56
2.	"Kaathama"	Sam C. S.	Sam C. S.	3:23
3.	"Aanandham Koothadum"	Snehan	VV Prassanna	3:02
Total length:				11:21

== Release and reception ==
The film was released on 17 February 2023.

Logesh Balachandran of The Times of India noted the film's "okayish message is let down by preachy and predictable writing" and that "as for the screenplay, it is pretty direct and despite being an investigative thriller, predictable for the most part". Rating the film 2/5, Sudhir Srinivasan from Cinema Express noted "the film identifies the right problems, offers superficial solutions, vilifies the wrong things, and exposes its own skewed perceptions" while also pointing out the ironical 'Item song' in the film which supposedly cares about women. Haricharan Pudipeddi of Hindustan Times called the film "problematic". Nidhima Taneja from ThePrint gave 2 out of 5 starts and criticised the movie and called movie plot outdated while praising Selvaraghavan's performance . She said, "It is a template borrowed from when women were deployed as objects to satiate details of an over-sexualised plot."

Sowmya Rajendran of The News Minute gave 1.5 out of 5 stars, criticised the movie and called that Baksuran fails as a thriller because it offers nothing new. Yuvashree from the ABP News wrote that "On the whole, you can see Bakasuran for Selvaraghavan, otherwise there is nothing notable to say. BBC News noted that while the first half of the film is somewhat interesting, many reviews point out that the second half is somewhat boring. In addition, campaigns such as the use of mobile phones and telling only women to be modest have also come under criticism. But in terms of cinematography, all the reviews have pointed out that this film is better than Mohan ji's previous films. K Ramkumar from Dinamani wrote "Bahasuran has evolved from a thought of 50 years ago. After many centuries, women are only now coming out of their ovens and starting to learn. 'Bakasuran' has come as a story written by someone who watched this with anxiety."
