= Mullum Malarum (TV series) =

- Genre: Soap opera
- Starring: Munish Raja; Dharsha Gupta; Akhila Raghavan
- Theme music composer: Jai Kishan
- Country of origin: India
- Original language: Tamil
- No. of seasons: 1
- No. of episodes: 385 (10 June 2019)

Production
- Producers: Vanitha Chandrasekaran R.K. Manohar
- Camera setup: Multi-camera
- Running time: approx. 22–24 minutes per episode
- Production company: Rajammal Creations

Original release
- Network: Zee Tamil
- Release: 27 November 2017 – 10 June 2019

Mullum Malarum is a 2017-2019 Tamil-language soap opera on Zee Tamil, starring Munish Raja, Dharsha Gupta and Akhila Raghavan. The series marks Munish Rajan's first small screen lead role since 2010.The show replaces Lakshmi Vandhachu and airs Monday to Friday from 27 November 2017 and 10 June 2019 at 6:30PM (IST). On 4 March 2019, the show shifted to air Monday through Friday at 1:00 (IST)

== Synopsis ==
It is a story that revolves around two brothers Dharmadurai (Munish Rajan) and Kalaiarasan (Pandi Kamal), Dharmadurai an uneducated blue-collar worker who works relentlessly to improve the financial status of his family but is not taken seriously by his loved ones and his brother Kalaiarasan, an educated professional who is loved and respected by everyone around him.

The show unfolds as the two brothers are on a quest for love and companionship. The twist in the plot is when Mahalakshmi (Tejaswini Shekar) enters their lives. While Kalaiarasan and Mahalakshmi are engaged to be married, fate has other plans in place as Dharmadurai unknowingly comes in the way and this relationship comes to a bitter end.

== Cast ==
=== Main ===
- Munish Raja as Dharmadurai - The main protagonist of the series. An uneducated blue-collar worker who works relentlessly to improve the financial status of his family.
- Dharsha Gupta as Viji (Malar) - The love interest of Dharmadurai. She is a beautiful, brave and homely village girl who is the support for the protagonist, struggling hard to enrich their future.
- Tejaswini Shekar (Episode: 1-201) / Nivisha (Episode: 202-277) / Akhila Raghavan (Episode: 294- present ) as Mahalakshmi (Mullu) - The main antagonist of the series. She is a beautiful but arrogant girl looking to marry the love of her life. But a sudden turn of events unintentionally caused by Dharmadurai marries her. So she begins to cause mayhem in the lives of Dharmadurai and Viji.

=== Supporting ===
- Vijay Krishnaraj / Narasimha Raja as Viji's father
- Vijay as Viki
- Pandi Kamal as Kalaiarasan
- Vanitha Krishnachandran as Kanthiyamma (Dharmadurai's aunt)
- Balambika as Periyanayaki (Dharmadurai's mother)
- Janaki as Dharmadurai's sister in law
- Sumangali as Vishalam Maha's mother
- Jayamani as Dharmadurai's father
- Nethran as Arivalakan
- Nivedhita Pankaj as Gayathri

== Title ==
This title was taken from a 1978 Mullum Malarum feature film starring Rajinikanth, Sarath Babu, Fatafat Jayalaxmi and Shoba. The English meaning of this title is The thorn and the flower.
