= Padikada Pakkangal =

- Poster
- Directed by: Selvam Mathappan
- Screenplay by: Thamizh
- Produced by: Selvam Mathappan; Muthu Kumar
- Starring: Yashika Aannand
- Cinematography: Dolly
- Edited by: Moorthy; Sharan Shanmugam
- Music by: Jassie Gift
- Production companies: Smoviepark; Pournami Pictures
- Distributed by: Uthraa Productions
- Release date: 17 May 2024
- Country: India
- Language: Tamil

Padikada Pakkangal (transl. Unread pages) is a 2024 Tamil-language thriller film produced and directed by Selvam Mathappan under the banner of Smoviepark and Pournami Pictures. The film stars Yashika Aannand in lead roles along with Prajin, George Maryan, Muthu Kumar in supporting roles.

== Cast ==
- Yashika Aannand as Dolly
- Prajin
- George Maryan
- Muthu Kumar
- Aadhav Balaji
- Eereen Adhikary
- Lollu Sabha Manohar
- Shobaraj

== Soundtrack ==
Soundtrack was composed by Jassie Gift.

- Sarakku - Meenakshi Ilayaraja
- Enge En Thangaye - Sreenidhi
- Theme Music

== Reception ==
Manigandan KR of Times Now rated two out of five star and stated that "Padikaatha Pakkangal is a poorly made revenge drama that makes you heave a sigh of relief when it ends." Roopa Radhakrishnan of The Times of India wrote that "All in all, Padikkaatha Pakkangal is the go-to movie for someone who is into unintentionally comical scenes in movies"
