= Sutrula =

2014 Indian film by V. Rajesh Alfred

- Directed by: V. Rajesh Alfred
- Produced by: V.Venkatraman; M.Ravikumar
- Starring: Richard; Mithun; Srija; Prajin; Sandra Amy; Ankitha
- Cinematography: Ravisamy
- Edited by: G. Sasikumar
- Music by: Bharani
- Production company: Purple Vision
- Release date: 19 December 2014
- Country: India
- Language: Tamil

Sutrula (transl. Tourism) is a 2014 Indian Tamil-language thriller film written and directed by V. Rajesh Alfred. The film features Richard Rishi, Mithun, Srija, Prajin, Sandra Amy, and Ankitha. The music was composed by Bharani with editing by G. Sasikumar and cinematography by Ravisamy. The film was released on 19 December 2014.

== Cast ==
- Richard Rishi as Johnny
  - Saran Shakthi as young Johnny
- Mithun as Mahesh
- Srija as Deepa
- Prajin
- Ankitha
- Singamuthu
- K.P. Jagan as David
- Sandra Amy as Sandra (guest appearance)

== Production ==
The project began production in late 2012 with businessman Venkatraman Viswanathan and Ravikumar opting to fund Rajesh Alfred's first script. The team primarily shot scenes across Ooty, using an old palace at a cost of 1 lakh per day. A 75 schedule was also held in forests in early 2013, with Richard revealed to play a negative role. The team held their music release function in April 2013, with Sarath Kumar and R. B. Choudary attending as chief guests.

Despite completing production in early 2013, the film was delayed for almost a year, before the team geared up for a theatrical release in late 2014. For promotional purposes, the team hired out jeeps featuring a doll, a pivotal character in the film, and rode around the streets of Tamil Nadu.

== Soundtrack ==
No.	Song	Singers	Lyrics
1	Azhai Azhai Pesi	Priya Himesh	Viveka
2	Lala Lala Sutrula	Aalap Raju, Padmalatha	Annamalai
3	Minnal Minnalai	Sriram Parthasarathy, Divya Menon	Snehan
4	Yaaro Yaaro Neeyum	Bharani	Snehan

== Release ==
The film was released across Tamil Nadu on 19 December 2014 alongside Mysskin's Pisasu (2014). The film opened to mixed reviews, with a critic from The Hindu stating the film "doesn’t respect your intelligence" referring to one scene.
