= Ujjayinee Roy =

Indian playback singer and actress

- Born: Agartala, Tripura, India
- Genre: Playback singing
- Occupation: Singer
- Years active: 1993–present

Ujjayinee Roy is an Indian playback singer and actress who has worked in the Indian film industry. Ujjayinee has worked on Hindi, Tamil, Telugu, Kannada and Assamese language films for musicians including A. R. Rahman, Bharadwaj, Sajid–Wajid, Illayaraja, Harris Jayaraj and Devi Sri Prasad.

== Career ==
Born and brought up in Agartala, Ujjayinee Roy is trained in Hindustani classical music and apart from being a professional singer, she is also a Bharatnatyam danseuse. She trained as a singer under two gurus, Shri Ganesh Dev Burman and then Pandit Ramendranath Dey, before getting the opportunity to start performing as a singer for All India Radio and Doordarshan Kendra from the age of seven. By the time she was eighteen, Ujjayinee was a graded artist and composer with All India Radio. Ujjayinee was schooled in her hometown of Agartala before earning a physiology degree at Maharaja Bir Bikram College in 1996. During the early days of her musical career, she had also been the founder member of bands like Tribe and Aurko, and was also a participant in popular reality shows likes SaReGaMa (Zee Television) and Pop Stars (Channel V). She later moved on to work on films, notably recording for albums including A. R. Rahman's Azhagiya Tamil Magan (2007) and Harris Jayaraj's Iru Mugan (2016).

In 2011, Ujjayinee met guitar player and music producer from Germany and Los Angeles, Ed DeGenaro and collaborated with him for his fusion album "Holiday in Madras" lending her voice as well as co-producing some of the tracks. The pair later married, and she then toured with him as the vocalist of his band and in the process, experimented with various styles and genres of music in the album and later co-produced and lent her voice for Ed's album "The Elektrik Circus". She also worked on her own independent album called "This Feels Right", some of the songs of which she has already released as singles. She has also released another original compilation called "Novocain For The Soul" with music producer Amit Gupta. The pair later married during 2017.

Ujjayinee was revealed to be working on a Tamil film titled Yevan as an actress by portraying a middle-aged mother. The film eventually did not materialise.

== Notable discography ==
Year	Song title	Film	Language	Music director	Notes
2007	"Nee Marilyn Monroe"	Azhagiya Tamil Magan	Tamil	A. R. Rahman	
2007	"Valayapatti Thavile"	Azhagiya Tamil Magan	Tamil	A. R. Rahman	
2008	"Ghanana Ghanana"	King	Telugu	Devi Sri Prasad	
2011	"Aa Hah"	Kandaen	Tamil	Vijay Ebenezer	
2011	"Oosaravelli"	Oosaravelli	Telugu	Devi Sri Prasad	
2014	"Naacho Re"	Jai Ho	Hindi	Devi Sri Prasad	
2015	"Dappankuthu Mettula"	Nannbenda	Tamil	Harris Jayaraj	
2015	"Let's Start"	Ouija	Kannada	Hari Nikesh	
2016	"Halena"	Iru Mugan	Tamil	Harris Jayaraj	

== Filmography ==
=== As actress in film ===
Year	Title	Role	Notes
2009	Saa Boo Thiri	Philomina	
2015	Thani Oruvan	Mahima's Friend	
2021	Cinderella	Ramya's Mother	

=== Television ===
Year	Title	Role	Channel	Notes
2017–2019	Valli	Chamundeshwari	Sun TV	
2018–2019	Chandralekha	Chintamani	Sun TV	
2018	Roja	Chamundeshwari	Sun TV	Special Appearance

=== Web series ===
Year	Title	Role	Channel	Notes
2019	Nisha	Kiki	Zee5	
