= Adhibar =

2015 Indian film by Surya Prakash

- Theatrical release poster
- Directed by: Surya Prakash
- Story by: T. Sivakumar
- Produced by: PB Saravanan; T. Sivakumar
- Starring: Jeevan; Vidya Pradeep; Nandha; Samuthirakani; Richard Rishi; Ranjith
- Cinematography: Philip Vijayakumar
- Edited by: K. Sasi Kumar
- Music by: Vikram Selva
- Production company: Benn Consortium
- Release date: 28 August 2015
- Running time: 134 minutes
- Country: India
- Language: Tamil

Adhibar (transl. Proprietor) is a 2015 Indian Tamil-language action film directed by Surya Prakash. The film stars Jeevan and Vidya Pradeep with Nandha, Samuthirakani, Richard Rishi, and Ranjith playing supporting roles. The film was produced by T. Sivakumar, who also wrote the story for the film. The soundtrack was composed by newcomer Vikram Selva with editing done by Zashi Qmer and cinematography by Philip Vijayakumar. The film was released on 28 August 2015.

== Cast ==
- Jeevan as Siva
- Vidya Pradeep as Suganthi
- Nandha as David
- Azraa Shameera as Vaisnavi
- Samuthirakani as Raja
- Richard Rishi as Karna
- Ranjith as Easwaran
- Thambi Ramaiah as Siva's uncle
- Kovai Sarala as Kumari
- Singamuthu as Suganthi's father
- Sangili Murugan as Parthasarathy
- Raj Kapoor as Ramachandran
- Saravana Subbiah as Balakrishnan
- Bharathi Kannan as Parameswaran
- Mohan Raman as Swaminathan
- Madhan Bob as Pankaj Lal Settu
- Vaiyapuri as Bobby
- Renuka as Siva's mother
- Sivasankar as Tiger Kothandaraman
- Poorni as Advocate Selvanayagi
- Rajendran
- T. Sivakumar as CBI officer Raj
- Kathaka Thirumavalavan as Neelamegam
- Kavitha Pujari as Radha
- Bava Lakshmanan as Panditji
- Sampath Ram as Rajesh
- Maayi Sundar as Govind
- Suruli as Suruli
- Kovai Senthil as Broker
- Scissor Manohar
- Kovai Babu

== Production ==
Adhibar began production in early 2015. The film was shot in various locations including Bangkok, Chennai, Pondicherry, and parts of Malaysia including Langkawi.

== Soundtrack ==
The music was composed by Vikram Selva.

- "Avala" - Vikramselva
- "En Kadhal" - Vikramselva
- "Poi" - Gana Bala
- "Athibar" Theme music

== Critical reception ==
Sudhir Srinivasan of The Hindu criticised the film, stating, "It is perhaps the most bizarre film I've seen in a long time". M Suganth of The Times of India rated the film 1.0 out of 5 and wrote, "Adhibar is an exercise in mediocrity [..] We are told that the story is based on a real-life incident that happened in Sri Lanka, but there is so much randomness in the movie that we start wondering if real life can be this random. Characters behave in the most implausible manner and take instant decisions that no sane person in real life might take". Janaki K of Silverscreen stated, "Adhibar tests your patience right from the beginning". Malini Mannath of The New Indian Express wrote, "Neither exciting nor refreshing, Adhibar is a dreary, mediocre fare".
