= Saravana Subbiah =

Indian film director and actor

- Occupations: Director, actor
- Years active: 2001–present

Saravana Subbiah is an Indian film director and actor, who has appeared in Tamil language films. He made his directorial debut with Citizen (2001), before making the romantic drama ABCD (2005).

== Career ==
Saravana Subbiah worked as an assistant director to Pavithran for Kadhal Palli (1997). He made his directorial debut with Citizen (2001) featuring Ajith Kumar in the leading role of a social activist. Prior to release, the film created anticipation with reports suggesting that Ajith would portray several different get-ups in a double role. The film released in June 2001 to mixed reviews, with The Hindu labelling it "a slow starter, but it picks up momentum after the first half and peaks to a climax, with a difference", adding that it is a "definite milestone in Ajit's acting career". The actor and director then began work on another project titled Itihasam co-starring Simran, written by Sujatha and focusing on caste issues, but the production was shelved. He was later offered the opportunity to direct a Telugu film featuring Venkatesh and Gracy Singh titled Vaakaaladu, narrating a tale on corrupt politics, but the project was stalled. In 2002, he also briefly worked on a film titled Anthanan with Arjun for producer Navodaya Appachan, but that venture also did not develop beyond the pre-production stage.

His second film, the romantic drama ABCD was released in November 2005, with Saravana also appearing in the film as an actor in a negative role. The film won mixed reviews, with a critic noting it had a "wafer-thin storyline". In 2007, he announced he had started pre-production work on a film titled Desam Kondan starring Sibiraj though that film also failed to progress. Similarly, he was briefly associated with a project titled Ennai Ezhanthen by Kumarappa, which was to feature Saravana in the leading role; this film too was cancelled.

Saravana subsequently took up other roles as a supporting actor, notably appearing in Mani Ratnam's Raavanan (2010) as a cop who betrays his team and in Thambi Vettothi Sundaram (2011), where he won critical acclaim for his performance.

In 2010, he worked as an anchor for the reality show Kanavu Meipadavendum on Makkal TV, which sought to hunt youngsters with managerial and leadership qualities. In 2021, he directed the drama film, Meendum.

== Filmography ==
=== As director and screenwriter ===
Year	Film	Notes
2001	Citizen	
2005	ABCD	
2021	Meendum	

=== As an actor ===
Year	Title	Role	Notes
2001	Citizen	Man amongst the general public	Cameo appearance
2005	ABCD	Chandra's husband	
2008	Thiruvannamalai	Police inspector	
2010	Thairiyam		
2010	Raavanan	Ranjith	
2010	Moscowin Kavery	Police inspector	
2011	Thambi Vettothi Sundaram	Sundaram's friend	
2011	Mahaan Kanakku	Auditor	
2012	Nellai Santhippu	Sethu	
2014	Meaghamann	Police officer	
2015	Adhibar	Police officer	
2015	10 Endrathukulla	Police officer	
2016	Visaranai	Saravanan	
2016	Velainu Vandhutta Vellaikaaran	Doctor	
2016	Kizhakku Chandu		
2016	Onbathilirundhu Pathuvarai	Police officer	
2016	Pagiri	Police officer	
2016	Kaashmora	Show host	
2017	Kanavu Variyam	Gopi's boss	
2017	Paambhu Sattai	Boxer	
2017	Sangili Bungili Kadhava Thorae		
2017	Saravanan Irukka Bayamaen	Police officer	
2017	Velaiilla Pattadhari 2	Prakash	
2017	Velaikkaran	TV Host	
2018	Goli Soda 2	Counsellor	
2019	Perazhagi ISO		
2021	Meendum		
2022	Ayngaran	Kid Rescue Department Lead	
2022	Naane Varuvean	Kathir and Prabhu's father	
2023	Bakasuran	Natarajan's Lawyer	
2023	Viduthalai Part 1	Collector of Arumapuri District	
2023	Va Varalam Va		
2024	Saamaniyan	Punniyavan	
2024	Maharaja	Inspector	
2024	Viduthalai Part 2	Collector of Arumapuri District	
2025	Kooran		
2025	Leg Piece	Deputy Commissioner of Police	
2025	Ten Hours	Election officer	
2025	Maareesan	Judge	
2025	Gandhi Kannadi	Inspector Mani Mozhian	Uncredited role
2025	Marutham		
2025	Others	Anbazhagan	
2025	Paruthi		
2026	Draupathi 2		
2026	Thiraivi	Police Inspector	
2026	Karuppu Pulsar	Velraj	
2026	Vasool Mannan		
2026	Vengeance		
2026	Battle	DSP	
2026	Sattendru Maarudhu Vaanilai	Minister Eashwar	
2026	Idhayam Murali	Minister Parandhaman	
2026	Magudam	Car showroom manager	
2026	Jailer 2	S. Sathyamoorthy	
