= Paramapadham Vilayattu =

Indian Tamil political thriller film directed by K. Thirugnanam

- Official release poster
- Directed by: K. Thirugnanam
- Starring: Trisha Krishnan; Vijay Varmaa; Nandaa; Richard Rishi
- Cinematography: J. Dinesh
- Edited by: Pradeep E. Ragav
- Music by: Amresh Ganesh
- Production company: 24HRS Productions
- Distributed by: Disney+ Hotstar
- Release date: 14 April 2021
- Running time: 132 minutes
- Country: India
- Language: Tamil

Paramapadham Vilayattu (transl. The snakes and ladders game) also shortly Paramapadham is a 2021 Indian Tamil-language political action thriller film directed by Thirugnanam. The film stars Trisha Krishnan in her 60th film, newcomer Vijay Varmaa, Nandaa, and Richard Rishi, while A. L. Azhagappan, Manasvi Kottachi, and Vela Ramamoorthy play supporting roles. The music was composed by Amresh Ganesh with cinematography by J. Dinesh and editing by Pradeep E. Ragav.

The film's release date had been postponed from its original date of February 28, 2020 for unexplained reasons. A year later, the film's theatrical release was cancelled, and it was decided to release the film via Disney+ Hotstar on 14 April 2021, during the occasion of Puthandu. It failed to impress audiences, who largely did not favour its writing and plot.

== Plot ==
Chezhiyan (Vela Ramamoorthy), the Chief Minister of the state who enjoys a massive following, is hospitalized, and his political party is on the verge of splitting into two. Amidst a heated discussion among the party members on who should be the next CM, Gayatri (Trisha), the doctor who treated Chezhiyan, suspects foul play in the former's death. She secures evidence related to the suspicious death but gets kidnapped along with her daughter Suji (Baby Manasvi).

== Cast ==
- Trisha Krishnan as Gayathri
- Vijay Varmaa as Cab Driver
- Nandaa as Tamizhselvan
- Richard Rishi as Tamizhselvan's sidekick
- A. L. Azhagappan as Kalingan
- Baby Manasvi as Suji, Gayathri's daughter
- Vela Ramamoorthy as Chezhiyan, the Chief Minister and Tamizhselvan's father
- Chaams as Kalingan's assistant
- Yogi Babu as Arasappa
- Sangeetha Sai as Priya
- Deepa Shankar as Chezhiyan's supporter
- Cheran Raj as Police inspector
- G. M. Kumar as Arivazhagan
- Sona Heiden as Manimozhi
- Nellai Siva as politician
- Citizen Mani as politician
- Thavasi as politician
- Sevvalai Rasu
- Muthukumar

== Production ==
The project is produced by 24HRS Productions Entertainment.

== Soundtrack ==
Soundtrack was composed by Amresh Ganesh. It features only one song, "Dhongana Koduka", sung by Amresh and Bhargavi.

== Critical reception ==
The film received mostly negative reviews from critics. Times of India wrote, "With a not-so-bad plot, the movie goes on to become a tiresome watch as the story progresses, thanks to unengaging and predictable sequences." India Today wrote, "Director Thirugnanam’s story is so predictable that even a kid who watches the film would guess the so-called twists from a mile away. Any story needs to have high and low points to make the proceedings interesting. Paramapadham Vilayattu has literally nothing to make you go wow." FirstPost wrote, "There is nothing in Paramapadham Vilayattu that we've never seen before. The plot and the politics are excruciatingly stale. The scenes are misplaced versions of real-life incidents. The characters are plastic. Overall, the film is barely watchable."
