= Vasool Mannan =

- Theatrical release poster
- Directed by: Vel Kumaresan
- Produced by: Arumugam Mathappan
- Starring: Niveda R. Nair; Sridevaa
- Cinematography: R. N. Sivakumar
- Edited by: Suresh Urs
- Music by: Bharani
- Production company: ML Productions
- Release date: 6 March 2026
- Country: India
- Language: Tamil

Vasool Mannan (transl. King of making money) is a 2026 Indian Tamil-language comedy drama film directed by Vel Kumaresan. The film is produced by Arumugam Mathappan under the banner ML Productions. It stars Niveda R. Nair and Sridevaa. The film was theatrically released on 6 March 2026.

== Cast ==
- Niveda R. Nair
- Sridevaa
- Vela Ramamoorthy
- Saravana Subbiah
- Saravana Sakthi
- Rindhu Ravi
- Imman Annachi

== Production ==
The film is directed by Vel Kumaresan and produced by Arumugam Mathappan under ML Productions. Cinematography is handled by R. N. Sivakumar, while editing is done by Suresh Urs. The music for the film is composed by Bharani.

== Reception ==
Kalki Online wrote that the story highlights the fact that many unemployed youths in the community are taking loans all over the town and causing hardship to their families. Maalai Malar stated that director Vel Kumaresan has directed the film with romance and comedy as the main focus.
