= Striker (2023 film) =

2023 Tamil film

- Theatrical release poster
- Directed by: S. A. Prabu
- Produced by: Henry David; Justin Vijay
- Starring: Justin Vijay; Vidya Pradeep; Robert; Kasthuri Shankar; Abhinayashree
- Cinematography: Manish Murthy
- Edited by: Nagooran
- Music by: Vijay Siddharth
- Production company: ASW Creations
- Release date: 8 September 2023
- Country: India
- Language: Tamil

Striker is a 2023 Indian Tamil-language horror film directed by S. A. Prabhu and starring Justin Vijay and Vidya Pradeep in the lead roles. It was released on 8 September 2023.

== Cast ==
- Justin Vijay as Joshi
- Vidya Pradeep as Priya
- Robert
- Kasthuri Shankar
- Abhinayashree
- Bonda Mani
- Mosakutty
- Christy Pooja

== Production ==
After hearing the script for the film, actor Justin Vijay opted to produce the film himself. Justin Vijay had previously worked as a video jockey, and had featured in minor roles in films including Kanchana (2011) and Madras (2014). The team requested the release of the title Striker from Doss Ramasamy, who had previously directed Dora (2017). At the film's audio launch, director Perarasu notably made a plea for the government to bring back Tamil titles for films.

== Reception ==
The film was released on 8 September 2023 across theatres in Tamil Nadu. A critic from Dina Thanthi gave the film a positive review, praising the twist in the climax. A reviewer from Maalai Malar, in contrast, gave the film a negative review, noting it is to be watched "at your own risk".
