= Mohan G. =

Indian film director and screenwriter

- Born: Chennai, Tamil Nadu, India
- Occupations: Film director, Screenwriter, Actor
- Years active: 2016 - present
- Other political affiliations: Pattali Makkal Katchi, Veera Vanniyar Peravai, Bharatiya Janata Party

Mohan G., also known as Mohan G Kshatriyan, is an Indian film director, producer, and screenwriter, who primarily active in the Tamil cinema. He is best known for Pazhaya Vannarapettai (2016), Draupathi (2020), Rudra Thandavam (2021) and Bakasuran (2023).

== Personal life ==
Mohan resides in Royapuram, Chennai. He belongs to the Vanniyar community. Mohan G revealed that he had used his name "Mohan G Kshatriyan" during the release of his film Pazhaya Vannarapettai (2016) and claimed to have an attraction towards the name. He also claimed that "Kshatriyan" is a name which represents warrior spirit and also said that he has his caste name written as "Vanniya Kula Kshatriya" in his birth certificate. During an interview in February 2020, Mohan G said the suffix "Kshatriyan" in his name means as “someone who defends society” and said that he is totally unaware of what other varnas do.

== Career ==
Mohan began his directorial career with Pazhaya Vannarapettai (2016), before making Draupathi (2020). The film had to be crowdfunded as no producer was willing to produce the film, fearing it would incite controversy. Opening to negative reviews, the film was criticized for its alleged intent to uphold casteism.

He worked with Richard Rishi again on Rudra Thandavam (2021). The film claimed that people belonging to the scheduled castes misuse the Scheduled Caste and Scheduled Tribe (Prevention of Atrocities) Act 1989, an affirmative action legislation meant to protect them from discrimination and violence. It echoed the political views of the Pattali Makkal Katchi (PMK) party. The film, criticised for allegedly promoting caste-pride and encouraging communalist hostility, received mostly negative reviews.

In 2023, Mohan worked on Bakasuran featuring Selvaraghavan and Natty in the lead roles. Following the film's release, Mohan noted that he had been approached by Telugu film producer Bellamkonda Suresh to direct the Telugu version of the film.

Mohan's Draupathi 2 film will also be with Richard, marking his third collaboration with the actor. Draupathi 2 (2026) is heavy on messaging but painfully light on engaging cinema. Despite its strong ideological intent and serviceable technical work, the film struggles to hold attention due to weak writing, forced performances, and a lack of emotional resonance.

== Arrest ==
The district Cyber Crime Police arrested Mohan G in Chennai on 25 September 2024 for hurting the sentiments of Hindu devotees and Hindus during a YouTube interview where Mohan claimed that impotency-inducing pills were mixed with panchamirtham at the Palani Arulmigu Dhandayuthapani temple. His arrest was after a case filed by the Samayapuram police after the Manager of the Samayapuram Arulmigu Mariamman temple submitted a complaint against Mohan G. The next day Mohan G was represented by a lawyer from Pattali Makkal Katchi and he was released in his own bail by the Judicial Magistrate Court-III in Trichy. After his request of Anticipatory bail, the Madurai high court granted him anticipatory bail on several conditions including giving apologies in Social media and popular English and Tamil newspapers in Tamil Nadu, attending the Palani police station everyday for three weeks to sign and that he should not be a mouth-militant and verify information before making any claims. The Judge also suggested that if Mohan G really cared about the Palani temple, he can go there and do cleanliness work. In November 2024, Mohan G released a video of his apology saying "I express my deepest regret. I will not make any claims like that again without verifying."

== Filmography ==
=== Films ===
Year	Film	Director	Producer	Notes
2016	Pazhaya Vannarapettai	Yes	No	
2020	Draupathi	Yes	Yes	
2021	Rudra Thandavam	Yes	Yes	
2023	Bakasuran	Yes	Yes	
2026	Draupathi 2	Yes	No	
