= D3 (film) =

2023 Indian film

- Theatrical release poster
- Directed by: Balaaji
- Written by: Balaaji
- Produced by: Manoj
- Starring: Prajin; Vidya Pradeep; Charle; Rahul Madhav
- Production company: Bmass Entertainment
- Release date: 17 March 2023
- Country: India
- Language: Tamil

D3 is a 2023 Indian Tamil-language crime thriller written and film directed by Balaaji. The film stars Prajin, Vidya Pradeep, Charle, in the lead roles with Rahul Madhav, Abhishek Kumar, Varghese Mathew, Gayathiri Yuvaraj and Aroul D Shankar portraying supporting roles. The film was released theatrically on 17 March 2023.

== Plot ==
Vikram is an inspector in D3 station in Courtallam. One housewife goes missing in an area. After 3 years, the DGP's son goes missing and a man gets murdered by a hooligan named Senthamarai who is the binami of a minister of the ruling party.the rest of the movie is about how Vikram and his friend solve the mystery with twist in the end

== Cast ==
- Prajin as Vikram
- Vidya Pradeep as Maya
- Charle as Mani
- Rahul Madhav as Vinay
- Mathew Varghese as SP
- Abhishek Shankar as IG
- Aroul D. Shankar as Manash
- Hello Kandasamy
- Ramanathan
- Ajit Koshy
- Lizzie Antony
- Rajeesh as Senthamarai
- Cheran Raj as Vincent
- Dhileepan Kumar
- Manoj as Andrew
- Dany Dayal as Antony
- Rajan as Selva
- Anandhi as Jennifer
- Gayathiri Yuvaraj as Malini
- Naan Saravanan as Sankaran
- Kuhasini Gnanasekaran
- Nagaraj
- Darshan
- Lungi Raj
- Nirmal

== Production ==
The film poster was released by Venkat Prabhu and Vijay Antony on 25 June 2022. During the audio launch Prajin actor noted that he acted naked in this film, as the director had asked. The release date was announced as 17 March 2023.

== Reception ==
Logesh Balachandran of The Times of India gave 2.5 stars out of 5 stars and stated that "D3 engages us in parts but struggles to give that immersive experience one would expect from an investigative thriller." A Maalai Malar critic wrote that "Prajin, who is playing the hero, has put in a lot of work for the film" and gave 2.75 rating out of 5 ratings. A Dinamalar critic gave mixture of review and gave 2.5 rating out of 5. A critic from Dina Thanthi noted that the "Climax vibrates".
