= Senthoora Poove (TV series) =

- Genre: Soap opera
- Written by: Nandhan Sridharan; PA.Raghavan; Guru Sampath
- Directed by: Abdul kabeez (episodes 1–220); P. Neeravi Pandian (episodes 221–present)
- Starring: Ranjith; Sreenithi Menon; Dharsha Gupta
- Theme music composer: Kiran
- Opening theme: Sendhoorapoove
- Country of origin: India
- Original language: Tamil
- No. of seasons: 1
- No. of episodes: 340

Production
- Producer: Thirugnanam
- Cinematography: Saravanan
- Editor: Vijay Krishnan
- Camera setup: Multi-camera
- Running time: approx. 25-27 minutes
- Production company: Kala communications

Original release
- Network: Star Vijay
- Release: 27 July 2020 – 13 April 2022

Senthoora Poove is 2020 Indian Tamil-language drama television series that aired on Star Vijay. It premiered on 27 July 2020 and ended on 13 April 2022. The series stars Ranjith and Sreenithi Menon. It has completed over 300 episodes.

== Plot ==
Duraisingam, a prosperous widower, found himself the sole guardian of two precious daughters, Kani and Kayal, after his beloved wife Aruna died during Kayal's birth. Despite the urging of his mother and sister, Bhaagampriyaal, Durai staunchly refused to entertain the idea of remarriage, steadfast in his devotion to his late wife's memory.

However, familial tranquility was soon disrupted by the machinations of Durai's conniving maternal uncle, who harbored designs to unite his daughter Aishwarya with Durai, envisioning a consolidation of wealth. Yet, Durai rebuffed these propositions, citing the vast disparity in age and vowing to secure a more suitable match for Aishwarya. Disheartened, Aishwarya grappled with her dashed hopes.

Amidst these familial upheavals, a new figure emerged in the form of Roja, a spirited young schoolteacher who bore an uncanny resemblance to Aruna, captivating Kayal's imagination and fostering a bond akin to maternal love. However, Roja's own romantic entanglements led her down a tumultuous path, culminating in a clandestine marriage with her beloved Anbu.

Tragically, Roja's happiness was short-lived as her uncle Pandian orchestrated Anbu's demise, thrusting Roja into a web of deceit and coercion aimed at wedlock with Durai. Despite Roja's steadfast refusal, circumstances conspired to push her towards an engagement with Durai, marred by treachery and subterfuge orchestrated by Aishwarya's conniving schemes.

Yet, amidst the chaos, Sandhya, Roja's loyal friend, sensed foul play and alerted Durai, leading to the thwarting of Aishwarya's nefarious plans. As the truth emerged, Durai found himself caught in a whirlwind of emotions, torn between anger and compassion upon discovering Roja's pregnancy with Anbu's child.

Their marriage, initially fraught with mistrust and resentment, gradually transformed as Durai confronted his prejudices and embraced Roja and her unborn child. Through trials and tribulations, their bond blossomed, fortified by forgiveness and understanding, ultimately heralding a new chapter of love and reconciliation in their lives.

== Cast ==
- Ranjith as Duraisingam "Durai": Aruna's husband; Roja's 2nd husband; Kayal and Kanimozhi's father
- Sreenithi Menon as Roja Duraisingam: Anbu's former wife; Durai's 2nd wife; Kayal and Kanimozhi's stepmother

=== Recurring ===
- Dharsha Gupta (2020–21) / Sandhiya Ramachandran (2021) / Sushma Nair (2022) as Aishwarya: Rajendran's Daughter; Duraisingam's cousin sister (Main Antagonist)
- Riya Manoj / Divyadharshini as Kayalvizhi Duraisingam "Kayal": Duraisingam and Aruna's younger daughter
- Nivashni Shyaam as Kanimozhi Duraisingam "Kani": Duraisingam and Aruna's elder daughter
- Priya Raman as Aruna Duraisingam : Duraisingam's wife, Kani and Kayal's Mother (Died and appears as Ghost)
- Shanthi Williams as Rajalakshmi, Duraisingam's mother
- Haripriya Isai as Swathi
- Shree Durga Gautam / Yamuna Chinnadurai as Bhaagampriyaal, "Priyaal": Duraisingam's younger sister
- Feroz Khan as Mayazhagu: Rajendran's son (Antagonist) (Dead)
- "Murattu Pandian" Babloo as Rajendran: Duraisingam's maternal uncle; Rajalakshmi's younger brother (Antagonist)
- Mercy Leyal as Jeyanti: Duraisingam's maternal aunt; Rajendran Wife (Antagonist)
- Pondy Ravi as Pandian: Roja's maternal uncle (Antagonist)
- Preethi Shree / Jeyashree Nair vas Shanthi: Roja's maternal aunt (Antagonist)
- Sumathi Sree as Muthulakshmi: Roja's mother
- Deepa Shankar as Mariamma: Anbu's mother (Antagonist)

=== Special appearances ===
- Dhiraviam Rajakumaran as Anbu: Roja's ex-lover and first husband (died in serial)
- Alya Manasa as Sandhya, Roja's friend
- K. Bhagyaraj as himself
- Vinoth as himself
- Sindhu (Vinoth's wife)
- Kumaran as himself
- Suhasini (Kumaran's wife)

== Production ==
The series premiered on 8 June 2020. Actor Ranjith, the lead of the series, makes his television debut with the series.
