= Bangara s/o Bangarada Manushya =

- Directed by: Yogi G. Raj
- Written by: Yogi G. Raj
- Produced by: Jayanna; Bhogendra
- Starring: Shiva Rajkumar; Vidya Pradeep
- Cinematography: Jai Anand
- Edited by: Deepu S. Kumar
- Music by: V. Harikrishna
- Production company: Jayanna Combines
- Release date: 19 May 2017
- Running time: 142 minutes
- Country: India
- Language: Kannada

Bangara s/o Bangarada Manushya (English: Gold, son of golden man) is a 2017 Indian Kannada-language action drama film directed by Yogi G. Raj and produced by Jayanna and Bhogendra under Jayanna Combines. It features Shiva Rajkumar and Vidya Pradeep, making her debut in Kannada films, in the lead roles. Whilst the soundtrack and score is by V. Harikrishna, the cinematography is by Jai Anand.

The film was officially launched on 15 January 2016 and its first teaser was out on the Shivaratri festival day. The first trailer was released on 24 March 2017 alongside his brother Puneeth Rajkumar's new film Raajakumara. The filming took place in Bengaluru, Mandya and Milan and released on 19 May 2017.

It was reported that the strategy used by the protagonist in this movie – to start a unique farmer agitation by curtailing the supplies of vegetables to the cities, which forces the chief minister to come to them and directly negotiate with them without any mediator – went on to inspire the farmers' protest in Maharashtra where they curtailed the supply of vegetables, fruits and milk to cities such as Mumbai.

It was also reported that according to BARC ratings for Week 45 (November 4 to 10, 2017), the World Television Premiere of this movie had resulted in a spike of slot viewership of Udaya TV by 25% in comparison to average viewership ratings of previous four weeks.

== Plot ==
Shivaraj is a wealthy businessman who has no feelings towards relationships. Nayana falls for him and joins his company, but he never reciprocates her feelings. He reveals to her that he hates relationships and the word "tomorrow" because one day, his father said tomorrow he would return, but he never did. He learns from Nayana's father that his father (Dr. Rajkumar) had dedicated his life to farmers. He also does the same and succeeds. But he falls unconscious on his self-created "Farmers Day". He says that the day he was talking to Nayana, he had a small accident and discovered that he had cancer which cannot be treated. So he always kept rejecting Nayana. As the film ends, everybody cries, including Nayana, who says that she knew about his cancer.

== Cast ==
- Shiva Rajkumar as Shivaraj
- Vidya Pradeep as Nayana
- Srinath as Doctor in guest appearance
- Shivaram
- Chikkanna
- Vishal Hegde
- Sadhu Kokila
- Srinivasa Murthy
- Sharath Lohitashwa as Minister
- Honnavalli Krishna

== Soundtrack ==
Bangara s/o Bangarada Manushya

Soundtrack album by V. Harikrishna
- Released: 24 April 2017
- Recorded: 2016–2017
- Genre: Feature film soundtrack
- Label: Lahari Music
- Producer: V. Harikrishna

V. Harikrishna was signed to compose the film's music and collaborated with director Yogi G. Raj for the first time. The soundtrack was released on 24 April 2017, coinciding with the birth anniversary of the veteran actor Dr. Rajkumar.

Track list
| No. | Title | Lyrics | Singer(s) | Length |
|---|---|---|---|---|
| 1. | "Aakasha Modalinda" | V. Nagendra Prasad | Karthik |
| 2. | "Neeli Neeli" | V. Nagendra Prasad | Sonu Nigam, Anuradha Bhat |
| 3. | "Innu Kaayalaare" | A. P. Arjun | Tippu, Priya Himesh |
| 4. | "Ondanondu Ooralli" | V. Nagendra Prasad | Vijay Prakash |
| 5. | "Thenege Thene" | V. Nagendra Prasad | Chintan Vikas |
