= Comedy Raja Kalakkal Rani =

Tamil comedy series

- Genre: Reality competition; Comedy
- Presented by: Rakshan; Priyanka Deshpande; Sivaangi Krishnakumar; Aranthangi Nisha (for Finale only)
- Judges: Baba Bhaskar; Madurai Muthu; Aishwarya; Uma Riyaz Khan; Jiiva (for finale only)
- Country of origin: India
- Original language: Tamil
- No. of seasons: 1
- No. of episodes: 21

Production
- Running time: 45-50 minutes

Original release
- Network: Star Vijay
- Release: 27 June – 14 November 2021

Comedy Raja Kalakkal Rani (transl. Comedy King, Entertainment Queen) is a 2021 Indian Tamil-languagecomedy series that premiered on 27 June 2021 and was broadcast on Star Vijay. The show is hosted by video and radio jockey Rakshan and television host Priyanka Deshpande. The show was telecast every Sunday at 1:30pm. The show launched on 27 June 2021 and aired its final episode on 14 November 2021. Madurai Muthu, Baba Bhaskar, Aishwarya and Uma Riyaz Khan served as the judges for this show.

The show was won by duo Sunita Gogoi and TSK, while another duo Rithika Tamil Selvi and KPY Bala emerged as the runner up of the show. Ramar and Deepa Shankar came in third place and Vinodh and Pranika came in fourth place. Actor Jiiva also appeared as a special guest and judge during the grand finale.

== Format ==
The format of this show is that 10 male comedians will pair up with 10 female television actresses individually. The duo who performs the best comedy act in the week and receive high scores from the judging panel will excel to the next round, however the duo with the fewest points that week will be eliminated from the show. The duo who wins the show receives 3 lakh cash prize and a trophy.

== Series ==
Season	First Aired	Last Aired	Winners		Runners Up	
1	27 June 2021	14 November 2021	TSK	Sunita Gogoi	Rithika Tamil Selvi	KPY Bala

== Contestants result ==
Contestant	Result
Sunita Gogoi and TSK	Crowned King and Queen
Rithika and Bala	1st Runner-Up
Ramar and Deepa	2nd Runner-Up
Vinodh and Pranika	3rd Runner-Up
Raju and Nisha	Quit
Satish and Gayatri	Eliminated
Jayachandran and Archana Ravichandran	Eliminated
Pugazh and Archana and Archana	Eliminated
Yogi and Shabnam	Eliminated
Dharsha and Raja	Eliminated
Rema and Thangadurai	Eliminated

== Duo's ==
Following are the duos who participated as contestants in the show:

1. Sunita Gogoi and TSK
2. Rithika Tamil Selvi and KPY Bala
3. Raju Jeyamohan and Aranthangi Nisha
4. Ramar and Deepa Shankar
5. Vinodh and Pranika
6. Satish and Gayatri
7. Jayachandran and Archana Ravichandran
8. Pugazh and Archana
9. Yogi and Shabnam
10. Dharsha Gupta and Raja Velu

== Competition Table ==
Duo's	Table of eliminations							
Sunita & TSK	Advanced to next round	Advanced to next round	Advanced to next round	Advanced to next round	Advanced to next round	Advanced to next round	Crowned King and Queen (winner)	
Rithika & Bala	Advanced to next round	Advanced to next round	Advanced to next round	Advanced to next round	Advanced to next round	Advanced to next round	1st runner-up	
Ramar & Deepa	Advanced to next round	Advanced to next round	Advanced to next round	Advanced to next round	Advanced to next round	Advanced to next round	2nd runner-up	
Vinodh & Pranika	Advanced to next round	Advanced to next round	Advanced to next round	Advanced to next round	Advanced to next round	Advanced to next round	3rd runner-up	
Raju & Nisha	Advanced to next round	Advanced to next round	Advanced to next round	Advanced to next round	Advanced to next round	Quit		
Satish & Gayatri	Advanced to next round	Advanced to next round	Advanced to next round	Advanced to next round	Eliminated			
Jayachandran & Archana	Advanced to next round	Advanced to next round	Advanced to next round	Eliminated				
Pugazh & Archana	Advanced to next round	Advanced to next round	Eliminated					
Yogi & Shabnam	Advanced to next round	Eliminated						
Dharsha & Raja	Eliminated (Eliminated on Show's grand launch)							
Eliminated	Dharsha & Raja	Yogi & Shabnam	Pugazh & Archana	Jayachandran & Archana	Satish & Gayatri	Raju & Nisha (Quitted)	Ramar & Deepa	Sunita & TSK
Eliminated	Dharsha & Raja	Yogi & Shabnam	Pugazh & Archana	Jayachandran & Archana	Satish & Gayatri	Raju & Nisha (Quitted)	Vinodh & Pranika	Rithika & Bala

=== Legend Key ===
indicates the King and the Queen (winners).
indicates the first runner-up.
indicates the second runner-up.
indicates the third runner-up.
indicates the eliminated duos.
indicates the duo has advanced to the next round in the competition.
indicates the duo quit competition.
