= Photographer (2026 film) =

2026 Indian Tamil-language fantasy mystery thriller film

- Theatrical release poster
- Directed by: Ashraf Ali
- Written by: Ashraf Ali
- Produced by: Abdul Basit Syed
- Starring: Ashraf Ali; Janani Samathanam
- Cinematography: Rayeez Ahmed
- Edited by: R. C. Pranav
- Music by: Rajkumar Chandrasekaran
- Production company: ABS Entertainments
- Release date: 7 August 2026
- Running time: 130 minutes
- Country: India
- Language: Tamil

Photographer is a 2026 Indian Tamil-language fantasy mystery film written and directed by Ashraf Ali, who costars in the film alongside, Janani Samathanam. The music was composed by Rajkumar Chandrasekaran, while the cinematography was handled by Rayeez Ahmed and editing by R. C. Pranav. The film was released theatrically on 7 August 2026.

== Cast ==
- Ashraf Ali as Veera
- Janani Samathanam as Dharshini
- Karunakaran as Kabilan
- Devi Mahesh
- Aadukalam Naren as Sengutavan
- Vela Ramamoorthy
- Nizhalgal Ravi as Dr. Shantaram
- Kalatpadai Jai as Kaali
- Uriyadi Shiva as Guide Madhi
- Vetrivel Raja as a forest ranger

== Production ==
The film was written and directed by Ashraf Ali and produced by Abdul Basit Syed under the banner ABS Entertainments. Principal photography was completed in Tamil Nadu. The cinematography was handled by Rayeez Ahmed, editing by R. C. Pranav, and the musical score was composed by Rajkumar Chandrasekaran.

== Reception ==
Rohini M of Cinema Express stated that "the team deserves appreciation for attempting something different and taking a fresh approach to the survival thriller genre." Abhinav Subramanian of The Times of India wrote that "Ashraf clearly trusts the spell he's casting; a little less faith and a little more ruthlessness in the edit might have kept the audience under it." Dinakaran wrote that the thrilling scenes that take place in the forest are a huge strength, adding that if the pace of the screenplay had been increased, it would have been more terrifying.
