= Koottu (film) =

Koottu 2004
- Directed by: Jayaprakash
- Starring: Richard Rishi; Aravind Akash; Sai Kumar; Manoj K. Jayan
- Edited by: P. C. Mohanan
- Music by: Mohan Sithara
- Release date: May 28, 2004
- Country: India
- Language: Malayalam

Koottu (transl. Companionship) is a 2004 Indian Malayalam-language film, directed by Jayaprakash. The movie was produced by Asharaf Liwa, Faisal Babu and Muneer K. under the banner of Liwa Films International. The film stars Richard Rishi, Aravind Akash, Sai Kumar, Manoj K. Jayan and Thilakan. The film was shot in St. Josephs Devigiri College, Kozhikode and Government Engineering College, Thrissur.

== Cast ==
- Richard Rishi as Harikrishnan
- Aravind Akash as Balagopal
- Sai Kumar as SP Vishwambharan
- Manoj K. Jayan as Hameed Khan
- Ambika as Sabitha Devi
- Sheetal as Pooja Nair
- Lena as Parvathi
- Prasanth as Ratheesh
- Shobha Mohan
- Thilakan as Dr. Hariharan
- Shammi Thilakan as Joseph
- Vijayaraghavan as Akbar
- Jagadish as Xavier
- Sukumari as Balagopal's grandmother
- Prem Kumar as W. J. Napoleon

== Soundtrack ==
The music was composed by Mohan Sithara.

No.	Song	Singers	Lyrics	Length (m:ss)
1	"Chulla"	Afzal, Anwar	Gireesh Puthenchery	05:02
2	"En Priye"	Sreenivas	Indira Namboothiri	05:27
3	"Enthe Nin Pinakkam"	K. J. Yesudas, Asha G. Menon	Kaithapram Vishwanathan Nambudiri	03:52
4	"Escottelo"	Afzal, Jyotsna	Rajendran M. D.	04:34
5	"March Masamaye"	Rajesh, Pushpavathi	Gireesh Puthenchery	04:41
6	"Thane Padum"	Vidhu Prathap	Rajendran M. D.	04:41
