= Rudra Thandavam (2021 film) =

2021 film by Mohan G

- Theatrical release poster
- Directed by: Mohan G. Kshatriyan
- Written by: Mohan G. Kshatriyan
- Produced by: Mohan G. Kshatriyan
- Starring: Richard Rishi; Gautham Vasudev Menon; Dharsha Gupta
- Cinematography: Farook J. Basha
- Edited by: Devaraj S.
- Music by: Jubin
- Production companies: GM Film Corporation and 7G Films
- Release date: 1 October 2021
- Country: India
- Language: Tamil

Rudra Thandavam (transl. Violent dance) is a 2021 Indian Tamil-language action thriller film written, directed and produced by Mohan G. Kshatriyan. The film stars Richard Rishi, Gautham Vasudev Menon, and Dharsha Gupta in lead roles, with Radha Ravi and Thambi Ramaiah in supporting roles. The music was composed by Jubin with editing by Devaraj S. and cinematography by Farook J. Basha. The film released in theatres on 1 October 2021 to mostly negative reviews from critics.

The film claimed that the scheduled caste (SC) people misuse the Scheduled Caste and Scheduled Tribe (Prevention of Atrocities) Act 1989, which is affirmative action aimed at protecting them from caste discrimination and violence. It echoed the political positions of the Pattali Makkal Katchi (PMK), a caste-based political party. The film was criticised for allegedly promoting caste-pride and encouraging communalist hostility.

== Cast ==
- Richard Rishi as Inspector Rudra Prabhakaran
- Gautham Vasudev Menon as Vathapirajan
- Dharsha Gupta as Varahi, Rudra's wife
- Radha Ravi as Indrasena, Rudran's lawyer
- Thambi Ramaiah as constable Joseph Murray
- Y. G. Mahendran as Ramachandran, amicus curiae advocate
- Malavika Avinash as Judge
- Manobala as Pastor
- G. Marimuthu as Suryaprakash, public prosecutor
- Jayam SK Gopi as Deputy Commissioner Annamalai
- Ramachandran Durairaj as Ranger Ravi
- J. Vignesh as Maaran
- Deepa Shankar as Annalakshmi, Maaran's mother
- Ambani Shankar
- Theni Murugan as Drug Patient's Caretaker

== Production ==
The film marks the third collaboration between the director Mohan G. and Richard Rishi after Pazhaya Vannarapettai (2016) and Draupathi (2020). Dharsha Gupta who was contested earlier in Cooku with Comali TV show, was cast in the film as the female lead. The Principal photography began in early January 2021. In February 2021, Gautham Vasudev Menon was roped in for an important role in the film. The film was entirely shot in Chennai in a single schedule.

== Music ==
The music of the film is being composed by Jubin, collaborating with Mohan and Richard Rishi for the third time after Pazhaya Vannarapettai and Draupathi.

Rudra Thandavam

Soundtrack album by Jubin
- Released: 2021
- Genre: Feature film soundtrack
- Length: 10:15
- Language: Tamil
- Label: Ayngaran International
- Producer: Jubin

Jubin chronology
Draupathi (2020)	Rudra Thandavam (2021)

Track listing
No.	Title	Lyrics	Singer(s)	Length
1.	"Ammadi"	Jubin	G. V. Prakash Kumar, Mookuthi Murugan	3:34
2.	"Vaalai Suruttu"	Jubin, Mohan G	Ranjith	3:40
3.	"Rudran Theme"	Jubin	Jubin	3:01
Total length:				10:15

== Trailer ==
The trailer was released on 24 August 2021.

The News Minute called the trailer as "another film that spouts his violent, casteist propaganda, creating false narratives about romance, masculinity, social justice and anti-caste ideology.".

Godman Nithyananda, calling himself of incarnation of Vanniyar clan god Draupathi, praised the movie trailer.

The Ministry of Minority Welfare stated that the trailer is misrepresenting the Christian community. They said that the movie might cause a religious riot among the common people and to avoid such issues of religious and caste politics they asked the DGP in a written complaint to take action. They also said that Mohan G is using the statement by one Christian preacher who spoke against Hinduism and apologized later to spread hate on the Christian community as a whole like it happens all the time and also asked to arrest anyone who indulges in religious conversions. Viduthalai Chiruthaigal Katchi (VCK) Tamil Nadu, youth wing leader Sangathamizhan criticized the trailer asked the director Mohan G that which course he took to earn the "Kshatriyan" title in his name and said Mohan G is a stooge of the Rashtriya Swayamsevak Sangh (RSS) and said that people will see director Mohan G as a caste fanatic. He also criticized the real name of "PCR" used in the trailer is "POA" and said caste is a problem of all humans and not only Dalits.

== Release ==
In September 2021, the makers officially announced that the film was released on 1 October 2021 in theaters.

On 27 September, prior to its release, a special screening of the film was held for Bharatiya Janata Party (BJP) workers. The screening was attended by several BJP and Hindu Makkal Katchi leaders.

== Reception ==
=== Critical reception ===
BBC News Tamil said "Mohan G has created the story focusing on the drug addiction of the youth. But since it would not be exciting to make a film with it alone, he has compiled and made the movie with the information shared on WhatsApp. Mohan G is busy saying what he has to say at all the moments available. It doesn't matter if the film is very modest. On the contrary, Mohan G continues to portray a few sections of society badly with superficial information. It is unfortunate that he thinks that it is his strength."

S. Srivatsan from The Hindu, "Unlike Draupadi, in which Mohan G seems to have played it safe by testing waters with his "ideology", he seems to have finally come out with this movie by making a passionate plea to "erase" caste from caste-related violence, in a shocking manner. Mohan G attacks his critics directly for calling him out for making a casteist work in Draupathi. He introduces a dangerous concept called crypto-Christians, primarily attacking Dalit Christians, who, according to the director, are benefiting from the fruits of caste, despite having been converted. There is a whole history behind why Dalits took refuge in Christianity, but that is not something this movie seems interested in. Everything is all over the place, from music to acting."

Sudhir Srinivasan of the Cinema Express said "Director Mohan G's protagonists of the two films he's done so far belong to the privileged and the powerful and are shown as hapless victims. His villains are either from the minority (in Draupathi) or from those claiming to stand for them (in Rudra Thaandavam). Mohan G seems to also detest human rights groups. He enjoys picking on loopholes in a system and projecting it like it were the norm, thereby mounting opposition to the very system and any potential benefits it may possess. In Draupathi, he spoke of how some men from oppressed communities utilised love marriages to extort money. The ulterior motive was to vilify all inter-caste love marriages. Here, he has more agendas, including mounting opposition to religious conversion and vilifying victims of caste oppression. But this time he has learned to mask these motives better. Ultimately, both Draupathi and Rudra Thaandavam, despite containing an interesting premise, feel simply like crafty arguments, mounted on exceptions, with which to defend the privileged and the powerful, and discredit the subjugated."

Ananda Vikatan gave 29/100 marks and said "According to this film, there is no caste problem in the society and the problem is the politics that opposes caste-based atrocities. Richard does not give enough acting while Dharsha gives a good performance. As the oppressed are still subjected to the oppression of the dominant castes, it is dangerous politics to disguise caste violence as ‘brotherly fighting’ and divert the next generation. Accordingly, it is an unethical act to create some artificial characters as representatives of those involved and to utter the directors own venom in verses."

Subramani of Puthiya Thalaimurai said "Mohan G has directed the film in a biased manner. When there are no arguments worthy of argument one spits out anger and malice. That is what Mohan G has done. It seems to be poisonously motivated that the scenes have been set up as if the scheduled caste youth are only engaged in drug sales and illegal activities. The villain Gautam Menon who is a political leader and drug trafficker is shown as someone with left wing ideology. A verse spoken by a Dalit mother, 'We must die as we were born.' is a social danger. PCR Act misuse may have happened here and there in the last few years but, it is a social danger for a cinema to show it as a norm. Can we do things to dilute the Dowry Prevention Act because it is being misused in some places? The film is full of right-wing ideas and one-sided ideology. The cinematography, music, screenplay and acting selection of the actors are all sloppy.

Cinema Vikatan said "There is no clarity in the politics in which the film speaks. The director shows the law enacted for the protection of the oppressed sections as a big problem. Even as brazen killings and caste rampages take place on a daily basis, questioning the Prevention of Atrocities Act, which supports the oppressed, is a venomous propaganda. Could the director, who appears to 'celebrating Ambedkar', also address the reasons for the religious conversion described by Ambedkar? Calling 'Subramani' as 'Subramani Arogyaswamy' jokingly shows the director's immature, tendency to ignore justice for his own sake. It is ethical politics to find out the root of the problem and talk about it clearly. It is another kind of politics to draw attention to the branches of the problem and protect the root from being left out and the director deals carefully with this type of dangerous politics. These types of films are taken based on Whastapp forwarded messages.

Ranjani Krishnakumar of Film Companion said "Mohan G brings together his research about all the impediments of social justice, and creates his protagonist from it who is patriarchy, casteism and fascist bigotry all rolled into one. The movie is a painfully long attempt at sealioning social justice conversations. It is a deliberately manipulative attempt to restore oppressive structures, backed only by quotes from WhatsApp. If the real world worked like in Mohan G’s fantasies, we would all be begging for mercy from the dominant caste male to live our lives. Thankfully, it doesn't, yet."

S Karthikeyan of the Dinamani said "The director has shown the caste and religious issues in drug trafficking and the politics behind it but has shown them all in a biased manner. The director's intention is in doubt as most of the scenes in the film are regressive. The movie shows people who are against right wing politics as villains and only right-wingers can enjoy this film. The fight scenes are poorly made and cinematography and music is good. The film may link all who protest in a bad light. On the whole, this movie is meant to add strength to those with right wing ideologies."

Karthiga Rajendran of ABP News Tamil gave 2 out of 5 ratings and said "The film has many elements of action, family, love, affection and emotion for a commercial spice film, but the film relies solely on the emotional content. Showing the Drug mafia as one community and giving a message "live united" while showing caste is important on surface level is contradictory. Hindu faith sentiments are kept all over the film. The fact that the Scenes have that Christian missionaries are systematically converting Hindus is not acceptable as shown in the film. Mohan G has inserted his comments into the film as if he had turned the jackfruit back, even though the usual hero villain was the subject.

Sify.com gave a rating of 3 out of 5 and said "Director Mohan G's Rudra Thandavam starts as a mainstream crime thriller with an upright cop Rudra Prabhakaran (Richard Rishi), who nabs the drug mafia in North Chennai. Mohan has also captured how the drug mafia uses religion and the caste angle to divert the case. On the downside, the film is too long and needs trimming of at least 20 minutes. Overall, Rudra Thandavam is a watchable flick."

Logesh Balachandran of The Times of India gave a rating of 2.5 out of 5 stars and said "Overall, the film could have been better if the makers had tried to be neutral in their approach while handling sensitive issues.".

Cinema Express gave a negative review and said "As this film wants to mount some opposition to cries of caste oppression, Rudra’s lawyer turns out to be a Dalit man (Radha Ravi). Hurrah for representation, you think? Wait, watch this man closely. Pay attention to how quiet he is about his identity, until that scene in which he uses it as leverage to protect Rudra. Notice how this lawyer proclaims that even though he's a Dalit, he worships several leaders including Ambedkar, yes, and Muthuramalinga Thevar. It’s clear who this film views to be a good Dalit man."

The Quint criticized the movie plot for its alleged casteist agenda and justification of police brutality. It said "Rudra shoots an accused even before the interrogation starts and this is depicted as heroism. In another scene, the justification for kicking the bike of two young boys running away from a drug bust is established by portraying them as putting a pregnant woman in danger. There are failed attempts by Mohan G to hide his casteism when he places dialogues like "Nee ellam meesaya pathi pesalama (Can you even talk about a moustache)", reminding the caste oppression where Dalit men were attacked for sporting a big or curled mustache."

== Audience reception ==
While theatres in Ariyalur and other northern districts saw audiences mainly belonging to the Pattali Makkal Katchi, those in Tiruchy attracted significant numbers of Brahmin priests. At the parking area, many two-wheelers were seen with stickers of Narendra Modi and the BJP flag. In support of the film, Hindu Makkal Katchi leader Arjun Sampath and various Hindu organizations offered sweets to the fans who came to the theater in Coimbatore. They also raised slogans that Rudra Thandavam should be a success.

More than 300 Vanniyar youths from the Pattali Makkal Katchi and Vanniyar Sangam marched towards the theater. They were dancing on the road to the sound of an drums, which disrupted traffic and caused a commotion. Most of the people fled when they saw the police, and the officers arrested five of them have registered a case against more than 100 people. Arul Rathinam, PMK IT-wing head said "Some recent films have shown one community as victim and other as ruthless villain. Some intellectuals and reviewers were glorifying those films showing indifference to the opinion of others. So, the youth see Mohan’s film as a consolation to their hurt feelings."
