= Vidya Pradeep =

Indian actress

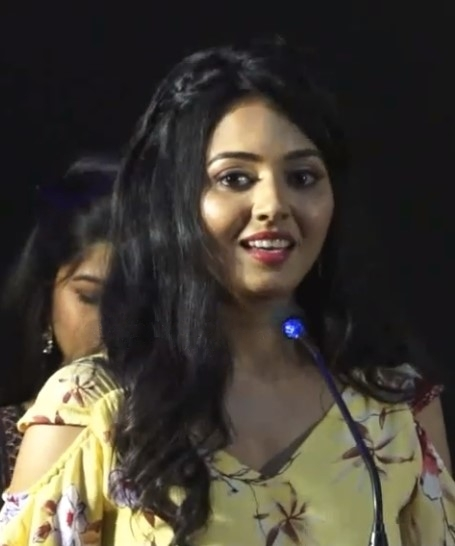
- Vidya Pradeep during Thadam audio launch
- Born: Alappuzha, Kerala, India
- Other names: Vidya Gopakumar, Dhyana
- Occupations: Actress, biologist
- Years active: 2010–present

Vidya Pradeep is an Indian actress and scientist. She is currently working as a stem cell researcher in the United States. Her films include Saivam (2014), Pasanga 2 (2015), Thadam (2019), and Kannagi (2023). As a scientist, her most recent paper is titled 'Aster-B Modulates Oxidative Stress Responses and Carotenoid Distribution in ARPE-19 Cells' published in the reputed scientific journal "Antioxidants".

== Career ==
After completing her Master of Science in Biotechnology degree, Vidya Pradeep completed her PhD in Stem Cell Biology at an eye hospital in Chennai. She worked on ocular stem cells, and her work has been published in the "International Journal of Cell & Gene Therapy".

She practiced Bharatanatyam during her childhood. While pursuing her PhD, Vidya worked as a model and appeared in several print and television advertisements. Vidya says that her break in to the world of Ads and movies were accidental. She also appeared in the music video for A. R. Rahman's "Aa Bhi Jaa" from his studio album Raunaq alongside Yami Gautam and several other models. Vidya was signed to play a role in a film by Lohithadas, but the film didn't materialise. She was subsequently signed to play a supporting role in Aval Peyar Thamizharasi (2010) and debuted under the name Dhyana. Her next film was Virunthali (2010), where she played the heroine. She was spotted by director A. L. Vijay, who cast her in his successful family drama film, Saivam (2014) to portray Sara Arjun's mother. For the film, she reverted to her original name and put on weight to portray a middle-aged woman. The film and the ensemble cast won positive reviews for its portrayal of a family. She then featured in the action drama, Adhibar (2015) as the lead actress opposite Jeevan. Pradeep then worked on Pandiraj's Pasanga 2 (2015). She worked on the psychological thriller Onnume Puriyala (2016), which made the headlines for becoming the first Tamil film to be remade in German, and played a cameo in Achamindri (2016).

Pradeep made her debut in Kannada with Bangara s/o Bangarada Manushya (2017) opposite Shivarajkumar, and the film opened to very positive reviews. Vidya was highly appreciated by the critics for her acting skills and screen presence. The New Indian Express noted that "Vidya Pradeep doesn’t stay a glam doll instead proves her talent in acting when called for", while the Deccan Herald says that it is a "fortuitous debut for Vidya Pradeep". In March 2019, she appeared in Thadam with Arun Vijay. Times of India said "Vidya's performance stands out" and The Indian Express stated that "Vidya Pradeep needs a special mention and manages to hold your attention undivided right through as Malar".

== Filmography ==
Key
†	Denotes films that have not yet been released

Year	Film	Role(s)	Notes
2010	Aval Peyar Thamizharasi	Dancer	Debut film; Credited as Dhyana
2010	Virunthali	Archana	Credited as Dhyana
2013	Proprietors: Kammath & Kammath	Radhika	Malayalam film; Cameo Appearance
2014	Saivam	Thenmozhi	
2015	Adhibar	Suganthi	
2015	Pasanga 2	Divya Kathir	
2016	Achamindri	Shruthi	
2017	Bangara s/o Bangarada Manushya	Nayana	Kannada film
2018	Iravukku Aayiram Kangal	Anitha	
2018	Kalari	Mallika	
2018	Maari 2	Kalai's Wife	
2019	Thadam	Malarvizhi	
2020	Ponmagal Vandhal	Shakthi Jothi (Psycho Jothi)	Cameo appearance
2021	Kasada Thapara	Vaanathi	Streaming release; Segment: Thappattam
2021	Thalaivii	Actress	Cameo appearance
2021	Chithirai Sevvanam	Lakshmi	
2022	Selfie	Mona	
2022	Ward 126	Yamini	
2022	Yenni Thuniga	Teja	
2022	Powder	Vidya	
2022	Second Show	Meera	
2023	D3	Maya	
2023	Yaadhum Oore Yaavarum Kelir	Maya	
2023	Infinity	Nandini	
2023	Echo	Nila	
2023	Striker	Priya	
2023	Kannagi	Nethra	
2024	Light House		
2024	Sattam En Kaiyil	Balu's wife	
2024	Thirumbipaar	Janani	
2025	Vattakhanal	Radha	

=== Web series ===
Year	Series	Role	Notes
2021	I Hate You I Love You - "Chapter 2 - Searching"	Shruthi	Madboys Original YouTube Channel

=== Television series ===
Year	Series	Role	Channel	language	Notes
2018-2020	Nayagi	Anandhi Kathiresan Thirumurugan	Sun TV	Tamil	Replacement of Vijayalakshmi
