= Saa Boo Thiri =

- Directed by: Arshad Khan
- Written by: Arshad Khan
- Produced by: Rajesh Kanna
- Starring: Akshay; Prajin; Arshad Khan
- Cinematography: B. L. Sanjay
- Edited by: L. V. K. Doss
- Music by: Abbas Rafi
- Production company: R Studios
- Release date: 6 November 2009
- Running time: 140 minutes
- Country: India
- Language: Tamil

Saa Boo Thiri is a 2009 Indian Tamil language romantic comedy film directed by Arshad Khan in his debut, and produced by Rajesh Kanna. The film stars Akshay, Prajin and Arshad Khan, with Mithuna, Pinky, Sara Alambara, Aksha Sudari and Ujjayinee Roy playing supporting roles. It was released on 6 November 2009.

== Plot ==
Three youngsters: Balakrishna, Keerthi and Pal who live in the same apartment complex and are good friends. After two years of struggle, Balakrishna finally declares his love for TV reporter Sherin and she spontaneously accepts. Keerthi and Jo are a married couple of IT professionals; they were madly in love with each other before getting married, but are now barely able to communicate normally, thus creating various misunderstandings. Pal is a college student who hates women of his age and he is only attracted to older women.

Balakrishnan's family forces Balakrishnan to see the bride Lekha, but Balakrishnan refuses to marry her because he is in love with Sherin. Lekha nimbly becomes friends with him and Sherin. After a trip to Pondicherry, which Sherin missed, Balakrishnan gets closer to Lekha and they eventually fall in love with each other. Tired of their marriage, Keerthi and Jo end up chatting with strangers on the net. Pal falls under the spell of the elder woman Philomina while his classmate Priya is secretly in love with him.

Lekha then decides to marry a groom chosen by her parents whereas Sherin dumps Balakrishnan when she learns about their love affair. Pal learns that Philomina eloped with her boyfriend; he is distraught but when Priya reveals her love to him, he promptly accepts her love. Lekha, who cannot forget Balakrishna, later cancels her marriage and marries her sweetheart Balakrishnan at the registrar office in a hurry. Keerthi and Jo forgive each other and they make up after the misunderstanding. The film ends with three couples living happily.

== Cast ==
- Akshay as Balakrishnan
- Prajin as Keerthi
- Arshad Khan as Pal (Palaniappa)
- Mithuna as Lekha
- Pinky as Sherin
- Sara Alambara as Jo
- Aksha Sudari as Priya
- Ujjayinee Roy as Philomina
- Rishwanth
- Gayathri
- Lavanya as Shanthi

== Production ==
Saa Boo Thiri is the directorial debut of Arshad Khan. The producer Rajesh Kanna and cast member Akshay were his college friends.

== Soundtrack ==
The music was composed by Abbas Rafi.

Track listing
No.	Title	Writer(s)	Singer(s)	Length
1.	"Suvai Karumbe"	Kavinba	Benny Dayal, Ujjayinee Roy	04:11
2.	"Athu Oru Adaimazhi Kaalam"	Na. Muthukumar	Vijay Yesudas, Ujjayinee Roy	05:15
3.	"Mazhaye Mazhaye"	Na. Muthukumar	Haricharan	04:51
4.	"Saa Boo Thiri"	Na. Muthukumar	Benny Dayal	04:02
5.	"Putha Puthithai Oru Vaanam"	Thamarai	Rahul Nambiar, Ujjayinee Roy	04:14
6.	"Athu Oru Adaimazhi Kaalam"	Na. Muthukumar	Vijay Yesudas	05:13
Total length:				27:46

== Release ==
Censor Board officials were disquieted witnessing the sequences where Arshad falls in love with a married woman. As it evokes denial amongst the Tamil film audiences, nearly 12 scenes of those sequences have been delivered and Censor Board officials have passed 'A' certificate. Initially, the film had its release date fixed on 16 October 2009, coinciding with Diwali, but it was released on 6 November 2009.

== Reception ==
Sify rated the film as a "Waste of time" and said, "The trouble with the film is that there is no story to tell, it is just a few incidents strung together by a non happening script [..] The film lacks a true Tamil touch and offers little in terms of surprise or twists. The music is bad and the second half is repetitive and too long with a predictable climax, and all is well with the jolly good guys and girls". S. R. Ashok Kumar of The Hindu wrote, "Since the line-up of actors in this R Studio's film consists mostly of newcomers, director Arshad Khan should have spent more time working on the script" and criticised the 'wafer-thin' plot and weak screenplay.
