= Prajin =

Indian actor

- Born: Prajin Padmanabhan
- Occupation: Actor
- Years active: 2003–present
- Spouse: Sandra Amy
- Children: 2(Twin)

Prajin Padmanabhan is born in Kozhikode, Kerala who works predominantly in Tamil and Malayalam-language films. He started his career as a VJ with Sun TV. He played the protagonist in the film Pazhaya Vannarapettai.

== Career ==
Prajin started his career in films with Dishyum followed by Saboothiri. He had the lead role in Manal Nagaram, a Tamil-Malayalam bilingual film set in UAE. directed by Shankar Panicker. He was described as the most desirable man on television in the year 2017.

== Filmography ==
=== Films ===
List of Prajin film credits
Year	Title	Role	Language	Notes
2006	Dishyum		Tamil	
2009	Muthirai		Tamil	
2009	Saa Boo Thiri	Keerthi	Tamil	
2010	The Thriller	Simon Joseph Palathungal	Malayalam	
2010	Tournament		Malayalam	
2012	Thee Kulikkum Pachai Maram	Pandi	Tamil	
2014	Sutrula		Tamil	
2015	Manal Nagaram	Manzoor	Tamil	
2016	Pazhaya Vannarapettai	Karthik	Tamil	
2018	Aan Devathai	James	Tamil	
2019	Love Action Drama	Ravi	Malayalam	
2023	D3	Vikram	Tamil	
2023	Akku	Harish	Tamil	
2024	Ninaivellam Neeyada	Goutham	Tamil	
2024	Padikada Pakkangal		Tamil	
2024	Sevakar		Tamil	
2025	Tharaipadai		Tamil	
2025	Kayilan		Tamil	
2025	Paruthi		Tamil	

=== Television ===
List of Prajin television credits
Year	Title	Role	Channel	Notes
2006	Penn	Kailash	Sun TV	
2006–2008	Anjali	Ashok Chakravarthi	Sun TV	
2007–2008	Kadhalikka Neramillai	Sakthi	STAR Vijay	
2008	Jodi Number One Season 3	Contestant	STAR Vijay	
2008–2009	Gokulathil Seethai		Kalaignar	
2017–2019	Chinna Thambi	Chinna Thambi	STAR Vijay	
2020–2021	Anbudan Kushi	Anbu	STAR Vijay	
2021–2022	Vaidhegi Kaathirundhaal	Vijay	STAR Vijay	
2024	Veera	Raja (Extended Special Appearance)	Zee Thamizh	
2024	Kannedhirey Thondrinal	Vikram (Special Appearance)	Kalaignar TV	
2025	Getti Melam	Srikanth (Special Appearance)	Zee Thamizh	
2025	Bigg Boss (Tamil) season 9	Contestant	Star Vijay	Wildcard entrant, evicted on day 63
