= Citizen (2001 film) =

2001 film by Saravana Subbiah

- Theatrical release poster
- Directed by: Saravana Subbiah
- Written by: Saravana Subbiah; Balakumaran (dialogues)
- Produced by: S. S. Chakravarthy
- Starring: Ajith Kumar; Meena; Vasundhara Das; Nagma
- Cinematography: Ravi K. Chandran; R. D. Rajasekhar (one song)
- Edited by: A. Sreekar Prasad
- Music by: Deva
- Production company: NIC Arts
- Release date: 9 June 2001
- Running time: 172 minutes
- Country: India
- Language: Tamil

Citizen is a 2001 Indian Tamil-language political action film written and directed by Saravana Subbiah (in his debut) and produced by S. S. Chakravarthy. The film stars Ajith Kumar in dual roles with Meena, Vasundhara Das and Nagma playing the lead actresses. The film's score and soundtrack were composed by Deva, and cinematography was handled by Ravi K. Chandran. The film was released theatrically on 9 June 2001, and became a commercial success.

== Plot ==
Abdullah runs a motorcycle workshop with a few workers. He also gives casual legal advice to the locals. A computer science student named Indhu develops a crush on him and tries to woo him, although Abdullah has nothing of it.

In a massive street protest by lawyers across the city, Abdullah, in an altered appearance, kidnaps judge Vedhachalam after introducing himself as 'Citizen'. Later on, Abdullah kidnaps collector Santhanam by posing as freedom fighter Sundaramoorthy. On both occasions, Abdullah mentions 'Attipatti', which left his victims speechless.

With these two high-profile kidnappings, the CBI, which Senior Officer Sarojini Harichandran leads, handles the case. Sarojini finds out that both kidnap victims worked together in the Mayavaram division some years ago and were involved in a riot in Attipatti. However, a check with the Mayiladuthurai sub-collector's office and the Nagapattinam collector's office found no town or village named Attipatti existed. She visits the collector's office in Thanjavur and is shocked to discover that the hamlet, Attipatti, existed in records before 1973 but not in the years after. She becomes convinced that the kidnapper has a link to Attipatti.

Meanwhile, Abdullah becomes irritated with Indhu, who longs for his affection. He scolds her and says she doesn't know who he is or the pain he endures in his heart.

The CBI team tracks down a former local government employee, which Attipatti was under, and visits Father Louis at Lutheran Chapel. At the chapel, Sarojini and her team meet Father Kuriakose, who informs them that Father Louis died ten years ago but left a box to hand over to whoever comes to the church and asks about Attipatti. Sarojini and her team find hundreds of dead bodies buried near the coastal area where the location of Attipatti was and a tombstone bearing the names of all who perished. Sarojini concludes that Arivanandam and Anthony, the name of a boy baptised after the atrocity, are the same people, and her further investigation leads her to Abdullah, who escapes via a secret route. Sarojini discovers Citizen's operation room within the mosque. There, she discovers Citizen's next target is DGP Devasagayam. However, simultaneously, Citizen kidnapped the DGP. The CBI officers receive information that Citizen is hiding in Tada Forest and go after him. Indhu comes to meet Abdullah and reveals she already knew he was Citizen some time ago. The CBI officers arrive at the forest and finally arrest Citizen. In the trial, Citizen narrates what happened in his village, Attipatti.

In 1973, Attipatti was a village of 700 inhabitants surrounded by the sea. Therefore, it is often flooded by rising sea levels, causing deaths. The hamlet's MLA had promised to build a wall in exchange for votes but never constructed it. When the villagers, led by Citizen's father, Subramani, go to the collector's office to ask about its status, the collector sends them away, saying they cannot build a wall in that area as the number of people is too small. The villagers later found out that the district collector, the MLA, the DGP, and the judge had taken 150 million rupees allocated by the government to build the wall. After that, when the four visited Attipatti, the outraged villagers embarrassed them by forcing them to eat mouldy rice and pouring water over them. In response, the four officials vowed to make Attipatti disappear from the map. One night, they arrived at Attipatti with henchmen, caught all the villagers, tied them on a boat, tortured them, and pushed them to the sea, killing all except Arivanandam.

In the present, at the trial, Citizen explains he did not kidnap the MLA because he got punished after losing the election. With the judge, DGP, and district collector on the witness stand, Citizen tells the court that the death penalty or life imprisonment is lenient for them. He says corruption exists because government officers want to provide a luxurious life for their family members. Arivanandam suggests stripping the wealth and citizenship of the three and all their family members. The court amends the retribution suggested by Arivanandam. The film ends with the court releasing Citizen as innocent because he fought for the good of the country.

== Cast ==
- Ajith Kumar as
  - Arivanandham / Anthony / Abdullah (Citizen)
  - Subramaniam (Subramani), Citizen's father
- Meena as Sevali, Subramani's wife
- Vasundhara Das as Indhupriya
- Nagma as Sarojini Harichandran
- Pandiyan as Rahim Bhai, Subramani's friend
- Rajesh as Judge Krishnan
- Nizhalgal Ravi as Collector B. Santhanam
- Chandrasekhar as Church Father Louis
- Rajeev as Public Prosecutor
- Vinu Chakravarthy as Minister Idithaangi Vaithiyar
- Pandu as Citizen's friend
- Mohan Natarajan as Judge Vedhachalam
- Devan as DGP Devasagayam IPS
- V. M. C. Haneefa as Manmadha Kutty
- Dr. Sharmila as Fathima, Rahim's wife
- Master Udayaraj as young Arivanandham
- Ajay Rathnam as ACP Krishnamoorthy IPS
- K. R. Vatsala as Devasakayam's wife
- Sethu Vinayagam as Minister
- Besant Ravi as Police Officer
- Rathan as Judge
- Sivakumar as Nair
- Kumaresan
- Kaka Gopal
- Kottachi as Mechanic
- Bonda Mani
- Saravana Subbiah (Guest Appearance)
- Kanal Kannan in a cameo appearance as comic rowdy
- Mani as Tea master (uncredited)
- Supergood Subramani as a butcher (uncredited)
- Halwa Vasu (uncredited)

== Production ==
Citizen is the directorial debut of Saravana Subbiah. Ajith Kumar put on weight for the film, which would feature him in nine roles, and he claimed that he was inspired by Kamal Haasan's award-winning performances. Sameera Reddy was initially part of the cast but opted out due to conflicting commitments. Subsequently, Vasundhara Das, who had earlier appeared in Hey Ram, was chosen to play the leading lady, while Nagma was selected to play a police officer. A special feature on the making of the film was broadcast by Sun TV in May 2001. Dubbing for Nagma was provided by actress Anuradha. Gemini Ganesan was also initially meant to play a role in the film, but his character was later altered in the script and replaced by Pandiyan.

After 2 months of pre-production, shooting started on 28 December 2000 with Ajith and Vasundhara Das, after the former completed the shooting for his previous film Dheena, which was also released in January 2001 during the Pongal festival, with Ravi K. Chandran as cinematographer who had replaced P. C. Sriram in the project. The location for the Athipatty scenes was an island situated on the outskirts of Chennai, and it took three hours for the team to travel from the city and then by boat to get there. A scene filmed at Rajaji Hall featured five thousand of Ajith's fans as extras. A song in the film was shot in Australia in March 2001, delaying the proposed release date of 1 May.

== Soundtrack ==
The music was composed by Deva and all lyrics were penned by Vairamuthu. The song "I Like You" is based on "I Feel Lonely" by German singer Sasha, and parts of "Pookara Pookara" were taken from "Take a Chance on Me" by the Swedish group ABBA. A Swamy of Indiainfo wrote, "This Ajith starrer has some good foot beating notes but sadly they are all lifts and blatant".

Track listing
No.	Title	Singer(s)	Length
1.	"Australia Desam"	Hariharan, Harini	6:46
2.	"Merkey Vidhaitha"	Tippu	6:13
3.	"Pookara Pookara"	Shankar Mahadevan, Vasundhara Das	6:20
4.	"Chikkimukki Kallu"	Shankar Mahadevan, Sadhana Sargam	6:51
5.	"I Like You"	Vasundhara Das	6:53
6.	"Merkey Vidhaitha Sooriyaney"	Shankar Mahadevan	6:13
Total length:			39:17

== Reception ==
Malathi Rangarajan from The Hindu labelled Citizen a "definite milestone in Ajit's acting career". Visual Dasan of Kalki wrote that Ajith's dream of trying out makeup techniques has come true but the director's celluloid dream is not valid due to weak screenplay and tense direction. The film was dubbed in Telugu under the same title and released on 28 December 2001. Reviewing this version, Gudipoodi Srihari of The Hindu wrote, "A well-made film, thanks to director Subbaih, its Tamil original was a big hit. The Telugu dubbing is equally interesting, supported by good dialogues".

The actor and director began to work on another project titled Itihasam, written by Sujatha and focusing on caste issues, but the film was shelved.
