= Richard Rishi =

Indian actor (born 1977)

- Years active: 1990 (Child artist); 1999-present
- Relatives: Shalini (Sister); Shamili (Sister); Ajith Kumar (Brother-in-law)

Richard Rishi is an Indian actor who predominantly appears in Tamil and Telugu films and few Malayalam and Kannada films. He is known for Koottu, A Film by Aravind and his subsequent movies with director Mohan G, namely Draupathi and Rudra Thandavam.

== Career ==
Richard made his acting debut with Jagadeka Veerudu Athiloka Sundari which was released in 1990. He was cast as a child artiste in the Tamil film Anjali in the same year. He first appeared as an adult actor in Kadhal Virus in 2002, playing the lead opposite Sridevi Vijaykumar. The film was released after some delay and fared poorly at the box office.

Despite a relatively high-profile launch through Kadhal Virus, Richard found it difficult to experience further success in the following years. After that he acted in the Malayalam film called Koottu (2004), which tells the story of two college buddies. The songs were a hit. Films such as Thiru 420 by director duo Sekar Kumar and Sengattuvan, where he starred opposite former Miss India contestant Swetha Vijay, were stalled after production began.

In 2005, Girivalam, a remake of the Bollywood film Humraaz, was released. The movie A Film by Aravind (2005) made him noticeable and gave him the stage name Rishi. In 2006, the Tamil movies Naalai and Yuga were released. Richard had a lesser role to play in the latter film, and the film received mixed reviews. Bhagyalakshmi Bumper Draw, a Telugu film was released in 2007. It was the remake of Bollywood film Malamaal Weekly. It also had Rishi playing a side role. Then came the movie Bangaru Konda (2007) with actress Navaneet Kaur. Maharajasri, is another movie for 2007. In 2008, came Veedu Mamoolodu Kadu with Rishi portraying as negative role, then Geetha, a remake of the Hollywood film Phone Booth and Three in which Rishi was reunited with the director Sekhar Suri. In 2009, he acted in Tamil movie Thamizhagam. In 2010, he appeared in Telugu movie Dammunnodu. His next movie Pen Singam (2010) failed at the content of story. In 2011, Uppukandam Brothers Back in Action (2011) was received negative reviews. Then came the movie Endukante... Premanta! (2012) where Rishi was in again in a small side role but the film was a commercial hit. The film Uu Kodathara? Ulikki Padathara? (2012) was a Telugu socio-fantasy with Rishi in a small role. In 2013, the only film that came was Kannada action comedy film Benki Birugali, where Rishi was in the lead.

His film Ner Ethir (2014), which was a remake of Across the Hall followed by Ninaithathu Yaaro (2014). Then came Avatharam (2014), with a devotional story. The film Netru Indru (2014) and Sutrula (2014) and was not received well. The Telugu film Adavi Kaachina Vennela (2014) was released to positive reviews. In 2015, came the comedy-horror, Maharani Kottai and action film, Adhibar. In 2016, he appeared in Telugu, Srimathi Bangaram followed by three Tamil films Kallattam, Pazhaya Vannarapettai and Andaman. His following films are Dr Chakravarty (2017) and Oollo Pelliki Kukkala Hadavidi (2018). Richard Rishi has joined hands with his 2016's political thriller Pazhaya Vannarapettai director Mohan G, to deliver a revenge drama stained with casteism in Draupadi (2020). The film turns into a drama where message gains preference over storytelling. He appeared alongside Trisha and Nandha in the political thriller film, Paramapadham Vilayattu (2021), portraying a goon who tries to strike fear with psychopathic tendencies.

== Filmography ==
Year	Film	Role	Language	Notes
1990	Jagadeka Veerudu Athiloka Sundari	Orphan	Telugu	Child artiste
1990	Anjali		Tamil	Child artiste
1999	Swapnalokam	Sanjay	Telugu	Debut as an adult; Credited as Rahul
1999	Bobbili Vamsam		Telugu	
2002	Kadhal Virus	Deepak	Tamil	
2004	Koottu	Harikrishnan	Malayalam	
2005	Girivalam	Giriprasad	Tamil	
2005	A Film by Aravind	Rishi	Telugu	
2006	Naalai	Justin	Tamil	
2006	Yuga	Sri	Tamil	
2006	Bhagyalakshmi Bumper Draw	Kittu	Telugu	
2007	Devathalu		Telugu	
2007	Maharajasri	Rajani	Telugu	
2007	Bangaru Konda	Chandu	Telugu	
2008	Veedu Mamoolodu Kadu	Rishi	Telugu	
2008	Geetha	Rahul	Telugu	
2008	Three	Sriram	Telugu	
2009	Thamizhagam	Shanmugam	Tamil	
2010	Dammunnodu	Bose	Telugu	
2010	Pen Singam	Nagendran	Tamil	
2011	Uppukandam Brothers Back in Action	Ettuveetil Ganeshan	Malayalam	
2012	Endukante... Premanta!	DK	Telugu	
2012	Uu Kodathara? Ulikki Padathara?	Rishi Kumar	Telugu	
2013	Benki Birugali	Chandu	Kannada	
2014	Ner Ethir	Karthik	Tamil	
2014	Ninaithathu Yaaro	Arun	Tamil	
2014	Avatharam	Prasad	Telugu	
2014	Netru Indru	Sathya	Tamil	
2014	Premalo ABC	Daya	Telugu	
2014	Adavi Kaachina Vennela	Sekhar	Telugu	
2014	Sutrula	Johnny	Tamil	
2015	Maharani Kottai	Sanjay	Tamil	
2015	Adhibar	Karna	Tamil	
2016	Srimathi Bangaram	Sriram	Telugu	
2016	Kallattam	Mahendran	Tamil	
2016	Pazhaya Vannarapettai	Moorthy	Tamil	
2016	Andaman	Thamizh	Tamil	
2017	Dr Chakravarty	Arun	Telugu	
2018	Oollo Pelliki Kukkala Hadavidi		Telugu	
2020	Draupadi	Prabhakaran	Tamil	
2021	Paramapadham Vilayattu	David	Tamil	
2021	Rudra Thandavam	Rudra Prabhakaran	Tamil	
2023	Sila Nodigalil	Raj	Tamil	
2026	Draupathi 2	King Veera Simha Kadavarayan	Tamil	
