= Pazhaya Vannarapettai =

- Theatrical release poster
- Directed by: Mohan G. Kshatriyan
- Written by: Mohan G. Kshatriyan
- Starring: Prajin; Asmitha
- Cinematography: Farook J. Basha
- Edited by: Devaraj S.
- Music by: Jubin
- Production company: Sri Krishna Talkies
- Distributed by: Anamika Pictures
- Release date: 2 December 2016
- Running time: 137 minutes
- Country: India
- Language: Tamil

Pazhaya Vannarapettai (transl. Old Washermanpet) is a 2016 Indian Tamil-language action drama film written and directed by Mohan G. Kshatriyan in his directorial debut. The film stars Prajin and Asmitha, while Richard Rishi, Nishanth, Karunas, and Robo Shankar play supporting roles. The music has been composed by Jubin with cinematography by Farook J. Basha and editing by Devaraj S. The film was released on 2 December 2016.

== Cast ==
- Prajin as Karthik
- Asmitha
- Richard Rishi as ACP Moorthy
- Nishanth as Dheena
- Karunas
- Robo Shankar
- 'Salim' Ashmitha
- Kaajal Pasupathi as Silk
- Tashu Kaushik
- Manimaran
- Theni Murugan
- Cool Suresh
- Gana Bala (special appearance in "Vaa Machan Vaa")

== Production ==
The film is based on real-life incidents that took place in director Mohan's life.

== Soundtrack ==
The film's soundtrack was composed by Jubin.

All lyrics are written by Mohan G.

Track listing
No.	Title	Singer(s)	Length
1.	"Vada Chenna"	Hariharasudhan, Padmalatha	4:14
2.	"Unnaithan Nenaikaile"	Velmurugan	4:02
3.	"Vaa Machan Vaa"	Gana Bala, Jubin	5:37
4.	"Life of PVP"	Jubin	1:23
5.	"Kaathirundha Ponnu"	Santhosh Hariharan	4:25
6.	"Friendship"	Karthik, Jackstyles	5:05
Total length:			24:46

== Release and reception ==
The film was released on 2 December 2016, and received critical acclaim. Sify gave 3 out of 5 stars and said "Pazhaya Vannarapettai has its moments but the amateurish performances spoil the show." Anupama Subramaniam from Deccan Chronicle wrote "Cinematographer Farooq does a great job with his lighting and composition and brings alive the milieu of the movie. Music is functional. An honest attempt from a debutant — definitely worth a watch! M Suganth of The Times of India rated the film with 3/5 stars stating that the director shows confidence in film making with good support from cinematographer Farooq who captured the 'nocturnal sights' of north Madras so real that makes the viewer difficult to believe that the film is actually a low budget fare.
