= Rajapattai (soundtrack) =

Soundtrack album by Yuvan Shankar Raja
- Released: 23 November 2011
- Recorded: 2011
- Genre: Feature film soundtrack
- Length: 18:52
- Language: Tamil
- Label: Gemini Audio
- Producer: Yuvan Shankar Raja

Yuvan Shankar Raja chronology
| Kazhugu (2012) | Rajapattai (2011) | Vettai (2012) |

Rajapattai is the soundtrack album to the 2011 film of the same name, directed by Suseenthiran, starring Vikram and Deeksha Seth. The film's musical score is composed by Yuvan Shankar Raja, and featured four songs written by Yugabharathi.

The album was distributed by Gemini Audio, and released on 23 November 2011 at the Anna Centenary Auditorium. The Telugu version was released two days prior.

== Background ==
Yuvan Shankar Raja, who previously worked with Suseenthiran in Naan Mahaan Alla (2010) was assigned to compose the music for Rajapattai, in his first collaboration with Vikram. The soundtrack featured four songs with lyrics written by Yugabharathi. Vikram performed vocals for the song "Laddu Laddu", with Suchitra and Priyadarshini, serving playback for Shriya Saran and Reema Sen. The song "Paniye Pani Poove" was sung by Javed Ali and Renu Kannan, one of the finalists of the second season of the reality-based singing competition Airtel Super Singer. The song "Villathi Villain" which featured Saloni Aswani in an item number, was recorded by Mano and Malathy Lakshman. The song "Podi Paiyan Polave", recorded by Haricharan, was repeated twice in the audio CD, appearing as the first and last track. The final mixing of the music was held in London.

== Release ==
Initially, Yuvan planned to release a single from the album on Deepavali, following the success of Vaanam ("Evan Di Unna Pethan") and Mankatha ("Vilaiyaadu Mankatha"). However, the plan did not materialise. The soundtrack was launched on 23 November 2011 at the Anna Centenary Auditorium in Kotturpuram, Chennai, with Vikram, Suseenthiran, Yuvan and the rest of the cast and crew in attendance. The album for the Telugu version, Veedinthe, was however released two days prior. The release coincided with a launch event held at Taj Deccan in Hyderabad by director V. V. Vinayak, with other noted Telugu film directors S. S. Rajamouli, Krish and badminton player Jwala Gutta being present along with the cast and crew.

== Track listing ==
All tracks are written by Yugabharathi.

| No. | Title | Singer(s) | Length |
|---|---|---|---|
| 1. | "Podi Paiyan Polave" | Haricharan | 04:34 |
| 2. | "Villathi Villain" | Mano, Malathy Lakshman | 04:51 |
| 3. | "Paniye Panipoove" | Javed Ali, Renu Kannan | 04:51 |
| 4. | "Laddu Laddu Rendu Laddu" | Vikram, Suchitra, Priyadarshini | 04:36 |
| Total length: | | | 18:52 |

== Reception ==
Karthik Srinivasan of Milliblog noted "Rajapaattai sees Yuvan explore a new sound and move closer to his illustrious dad's legacy – if not tune-wise, at least sound-wise." Malathi Rangarajan of The Hindu added "Among Yuvan's numbers 'Paniyae Pani Poovae' alone passes muster. But his title score makes you nod in appreciation." In a negative review, CNN-IBN said "Yuvan Shankar Raja disappoints with his songs." Pavithra Srinivasan of Rediff.com wrote "Perhaps realising the futility of the project, Yuvan Shankar Raja hasn't troubled himself to provide great songs."
