= Freedom (2025 film) =

Unreleased 2025 film by Sathyasiva

- Poster with cancelled release date
- Directed by: Sathyasiva
- Written by: Sathyasiva
- Produced by: Pandiyan Parasuraman
- Starring: M. Sasikumar; Lijomol Jose
- Cinematography: N. S. Uthayakumar
- Edited by: N. B. Srikanth
- Music by: Ghibran Vaibodha
- Production company: Vijaya Ganapathy's Pictures
- Release date: 9 July 2025 (preview)
- Running time: 129 minutes
- Country: India
- Language: Tamil

Freedom is a 2025 Indian Tamil-language crime drama film written and directed by Sathyasiva. It is produced by Pandiyan Parasuraman under the banner Vijaya Ganapathy's Pictures. The film stars M. Sasikumar and Lijomol Jose in the lead roles.

The film previewed on 9 July 2025 and was set to release theatrically the next day before getting delayed due to financial issues.

== Plot ==
In the early 1990s, following the assassination of Rajiv Gandhi, several innocent Sri Lankan Tamil refugees are unlawfully detained and tortured by suspicious police officers, and eventually plot to escape.

== Cast ==
- M. Sasikumar as Maaran
- Lijomol Jose as Selvi
- Sudev Nair as Chief Officer
- Malavika Avinash as Lawyer
- Bose Venkat
- Mu Ramasamy
- Saravanan
- Ramesh Khanna

== Production ==
In early-February 2024, it was reported that M. Sasikumar and Lijomol Jose will be appearing their next in the film titled Freedom, directed by Sathyasiva, reuniting with Sasikumar after Naan Mirugamaai Maara (2022). Featuring Sasikumar and Lijomol as Sri Lankan Tamil refugees, the film features Sudev Nair as the antagonist alongside Malavika Avinash, Bose Venkat, Mu Ramaswamy, Saravanan, Ramesh Khanna and others in key roles.

The film is produced by Pandiyan Parasuraman under Vijaya Ganapathy's Pictures. The music for the film is composed by Ghibran Vaibodha, while cinematography is handled by N. S. Uthayakumar and editing by N. B. Srikanth. On 23 June 2025, the production house officially confirmed about the wrapping of the filming process.

== Music ==
Freedom

Soundtrack album by Ghibran Vaibodha
- Genre: Feature film soundtrack
- Language: Tamil
- Label: Trend Music
- Producer: Ghibran Vaibodha

Ghibran Vaibodha chronology
JSK: Janaki V v/s State of Kerala (2025)	Freedom (2025)	Biker (2026)

Singles from Freedom
- 1. "Aagayam Ambuttayum" Released: 8 November 2024; 2. "Aariro Arariro" Released: 30 June 2025

The film has music composed by Ghibran, in his second collaboration with Sathyasiva and third with Sasikumar. The first single "Aagayam Ambuttayum" was released on 8 November 2024. The second single "Aariro Arariro" was released on 30 June 2025.

Track listing
No.	Title	Lyrics	Singer(s)	Length
1.	"Aagayam Ambuttayum"	Snehan	Pradeep Kumar
2.	"Aariro Arariro"	Mohan Rajan	Vaikom Vijayalakshmi

== Release ==
Freedom was scheduled to release in theatres on 18 July 2025, but got postponed indefinitely without the makers announcing a new release date. Earlier the film was scheduled for 10 July, but got postponed to the next week, and then to the current date due to financial issues faced by the production house. Apart from Tamil, dubbed versions in Telugu, Kannada, Malayalam and Hindi languages were planned for release.

== Reception ==
Reviewing the film at its preview show on 9 July 2025, Abhinav Subramanian of The Times of India gave 2.5/5 stars and wrote "Freedom is a historical document that exposes a dark corner many prefer to ignore. It's not the most gripping film, but it's interesting enough to make you look up the real story of those 43 inmates". Bhuvanesh Chandar of The Hindu wrote, "Alternating between the plight of the prisoners and their family members at the camp, Freedom ends up becoming so tunnel-visioned on selling the sentimentality of the story that it removes any scope for pointed political commentary". Janani K of India Today wrote, "Freedom naturally had a story that could strike a chord with the audience. However, Sathyasiva's film fails to capitalise on the intensity of the story with its sloppy execution".

Anusha Sundar of OTTPlay wrote, "Freedom is supposed to be a story that may not have been on people's memory or radar for long, but definitely one that belongs to a big-screen adaptation. But the film with little to less understanding of its gravitas, missteps into a wrong genre that did not warrant an overdose of physical torture onscreen, but an empathetic portrayal of a story less told". A critic from Hindu Tamil Thisai said they were shaken by the scenes depicting torture, and the tunneling and escape scenes in the second half were interesting, compensating for the unnecessary burdens of the first half. The critic also praised the performances of Sasikumar, Lijomol, Ramasamy and Ramesh Khanna, but felt Malavika Avinash was underutilised.

== See also ==
- Portrayals of Sri Lankan Tamils in Indian cinema
