= JSK =

JSK may refer to:

- Jai Shree Krishna (in his form as Lord Purushottama).
- JS Kabylie, an Algerian football club
- JS Kairouan, a Tunisian football club
- Jansankhya Sthirata Kosh, an Indian population concern organization
- Janette Sadik-Khan, former Commissioner of the New York City Department of Transportation
- Jumper skirt
- Joburg Super Kings, cricket team in South Africa Premier League
- JSK: Janaki V v/s State of Kerala, 2025 Indian film
