= Kazhugu =

Kazhugu (lit. 'eagle') may refer to the following Indian films in Tamil:

- Kazhugu (1981 film), directed by S. P. Muthuraman
- Kazhugu (2012 film), directed by Sathyasiva
  - Kazhugu 2, its 2019 sequel
- Kazhugu, a dubbed Tamil version of Sye (2004), directed by S. S. Rajamouli
