= Panjaa (soundtrack) =

2011 album by Yuvan Shankar Raja

- Album cover

Soundtrack album by Yuvan Shankar Raja
- Released: 18 November 2011
- Recorded: 2011
- Genre: Feature film soundtrack
- Length: 23:54
- Language: Telugu
- Label: Aditya Music
- Producer: Yuvan Shankar Raja

Yuvan Shankar Raja chronology
Mankatha (2011)	Panjaa (2011)	Kazhugu (2011)

Panjaa is the soundtrack to the 2011 film of the same name directed by Vishnuvardhan starring Pawan Kalyan, Sarah-Jane Dias, Anjali Lavania, Jackie Shroff, Adivi Sesh and Atul Kulkarni. The soundtrack features six songs composed by Yuvan Shankar Raja with lyrics written by Chandrabose and Ramajogayya Sastry. The soundtrack was released by Aditya Music on 18 November 2011.

== Development ==
Vishnuvardhan's norm composer Yuvan Shankar Raja assigned to score music for Panjaa, in his maiden collaboration with Kalyan. He started composing music for the film in late January 2011, and took nearly eight months working on the soundtrack, due to Yuvan's commitments on other Tamil and Telugu projects. The soundtrack was mixed by Kausikan Sivalingam in Berlin, a norm collaborator of Yuvan. On 16 November 2011, Yuvan started re-recording the film's background score during the post-production process. Pawan Kalyan also sang the track "Paparayudu" with Hemachandra, Sathyan and Brahmanandam, touted to be a "satirical number"; Yuvan sung the titular track. Further singers were announced with the song list being revealed prior to the audio launch with Haricharan, Shweta Pandit, Saloni, Belly Raj, Priya Himesh performing. Yuvan reused the background score in the Tamil-language film Ameerin Aadhi-Bhagavan (2012).

== Release ==
Aditya Music acquired the audio rights. In mid-October 2011, the soundtrack was planned for release on 13 November 2011 at the Gachibowli Indoor Stadium in Hyderabad. However, it was postponed due to the sudden demise of Yuvan's mother. The audio launch was later held on 18 November 2011 at the said venue. Along with the cast and crew, noted film personalities including directors K. Raghavendra Rao and S. S. Rajamouli, composer M. M. Keeravani and actor Rana Daggubati attended the function, which was anchored by comedian Ali and Suma Kanakala. The event was broadcast live on MAA TV.

== Reception ==
Upon release, the songs generally garnered positive response. A critic from 123Telugu reviewed the soundtrack being "different and modern" and not a regular soundtrack from Kalyan's earlier films. IndiaGlitz reviewed: "With six instantly likable songs, this audio is a feather in the cap of the Kollywood musician. It indeed sets the tone for the movie." Karthik Srinivasan of Milliblog wrote "Panjaa is more of what one expects from Yuvan, in safe doses." The Indian Express listed the title track as "the song of the year" further adding that "it has not only elevated the film but has also got youngsters grooving to its racy tune".

== Track listing ==
No.	Title	Lyrics	Singer(s)	Length
1.	"Panjaa"	Ramajogayya Sastry	Yuvan Shankar Raja	3:34
2.	"Ela Ela"	Chandrabose	Haricharan, Shweta Pandit	5:06
3.	"Veyira Cheyyi Veyira"	Ramajogayya Sastry	Saloni	4:29
4.	"Kshanam Kshanam"	Chandrabose	Shweta Pandit	1:45
5.	"Anukoneledhugaa Kalakaanekaadhugaa"	Chandrabose	Belly Raj, Priya Himesh	4:25
6.	"Paparayudu"	Ramajogayya Sastry	Hemachandra, Sathyan, Pawan Kalyan, Brahmanandam	5:15
Total length:				23:54
