= 1945 (2022 film) =

- Theatrical release poster
- Directed by: Sathyasiva
- Written by: Sathyasiva
- Dialogues by: Akula Siva (Telugu)
- Produced by: S. N. Rajarajan
- Starring: Rana Daggubati; Regena Cassandrra; Sathyaraj; Nassar
- Cinematography: Sathya Ponmar
- Edited by: Gopi Krishna
- Music by: Yuvan Shankar Raja
- Production company: K Productions
- Release dates: 7 January 2022 (Telugu); 4 July 2022 (Tamil)
- Running time: 122 minutes
- Country: India
- Languages: Telugu; Tamil

1945 is a 2022 Indian war drama film directed by Sathyasiva and produced by S. N. Rajarajan of K Production. It was simultaneously shot in Telugu and Tamil languages under the same title. The film stars Rana Daggubati, Regena Cassandrra, Sathyaraj and Nassar. The music was composed by Yuvan Shankar Raja with cinematography by Sathya Ponmar and editing by Gopi Krishna. The film began its production in 2016 but was left unfinished due to differences between the producer and the lead actor before the film was eventually released in 2022.

The Telugu version of the film was released theatrically on 7 January 2022. The Tamil version premiered via a streaming platform on 4 July 2022.

== Plot ==
In 1945, the British police stationed in Burma hear the news of a supposed plane crash in which Netaji Subhash Chandra Bose dies presumably, so they devise plans to overthrow the INA started by Netaji. The INA also plan to start a rebellion in 1945 in order to subdue the British Raj, with Burma being their organizational center. However an internal dispute arises within the INA as to whether Netaji supposedly died or not. Adhi is an active member of the INA, who voices out to his fellow INA members that Netaji still lives, but others refuse to listen to him. A depressed Adhi now recalls his past as to how he was inspired to join the INA.

In the year 1942, Adhi was a budding barrister who had come to Burma from India to work under Subbayya, a leading barrister of that time who was also a convoy and friend of the British. It is revealed that Adhi intended to marry Anandhi, the daughter of Subbayya, and both fall in love when they meet each other. In Burma, Adhi learns of the dismal fate of his compatriots who are tortured and killed by some malicious British officers who also loot the wealth of the common people. Adhi comes to learn of the INA founded by Netaji fighting against the British. Inspired by their work, he joins their alliance, takes up arms, and annihilates many corrupt British officers. On learning this, Subbayya, who had initially approved of his daughter's marriage to Adhi, now disapproves of it and tries to separate Adhi from his family. However Adhi and Anandhi still love each other, and Adhi's friend tries to convince Subbayya for their wedding. Subbayya hesitantly agrees, and Adhi and Anandhi get married.

Meanwhile, a protest ensues between the Indians in Burma and the Britishers there, in which many innocent people are killed by the British, including Adhi's friend. This enrages Adhi, who takes the help of the INA and kills the British governor in a coup. In retaliation, the British soldiers also kill many INA members; however, Adhi manages to survive. Meanwhile, Subbayya, who learns of Adhi's ways, quickly manages to flee with his wife and daughter on board a ship. Before boarding the ship, Anandhi meets Adhi during an ensuing fight between him and the Britishers and tells him that she is leaving to India on her father's advice, but she still loves him and asks him to complete the mission that he had started and then return to his family in India if destiny permits.

== Cast ==
- Rana Daggubati as Adhi
- Regina Cassandra as Anandhi
- Sathyaraj as Ramalingaiah
- Nassar as Subbayya
- Saptagiri (Telugu) / Kaali Venkat (Tamil) as Krishna, Adhi's friend
- Rekha Suresh as Anandhi's mother
- Leesha Eclairs as Poorvi
- Sampath Ram as Police officer
- Yaar Kannan
- Boys Rajan
- Redgiant Subramani
- Billy Murali as Police officer
- Pasupathi Raj

== Production ==
=== Development ===
Sathyasiva first began scripting the film in mid-2015 and approached Jiiva to play the lead role, but the film did not find producers. S. N. Rajarajan, who won the rights for Baahubali: The Conclusion, bankrolled the bilingual project. As Rana Daggubati was picked to play the lead due to closeness of the producer, Regina Cassandra was chosen to pair with Rana after considering several heroines. Later, Nassar and Sathyaraj were also chosen to play important roles than supporting ones. Yuvan Shankar Raja was roped in to compose music for the project, after previously collaborated with Sathyasiva in Kazhugu (2012) and Kazhugu 2 (2018). On the first look poster release, it was revealed that Sathya Ponmar, Gopi Krishna, and E. Thiyagarajan were selected as cinematographer, editor and art director respectively. The three of them previously collaborated with Sathyasiva in his earlier films. The Tamil version was originally titled Madai Thiranthu before the name was changed to 1945.

=== Filming ===
The principal photography had been in progress at Kochi since 19 August 2016. Depicting Subhas Chandra Bose's Independence movement in the 1940s, huge sets have been erected along the beach for this period drama as the portions for Nassar and Regina Cassandra have been canned. Sathyaraj was expected to join the next schedule of shoot in September, and Rana Daggubati was likely to join the production unit shortly once he wrapped up Baahubali: The Conclusion (2017). A schedule was completed in October 2017 at Kochi in Kerala and Sri Lanka. Rana Daggubati went clean-shaven for a portion of the film.

== Soundtrack ==
The soundtrack of the film was composed by Yuvan Shankar Raja, collaborating with the director for the third time. While the lyrics are written by Mohana Raja and Arul Kamaraj, the audio rights are bagged by Muzik 247.

Tamil Tracklist
No.	Title	Lyrics	Singer(s)	Length
1.	"Yennadi Seidhaai"	Mohana Raja	Haricharan, Priya Mali	3:18
Total length:				3:18

Telugu Tracklist
No.	Title	Lyrics	Singer(s)	Length
1.	"Allari Chese Kala"	Ananta Sriram	Haricharan, Priya Mali	3:18
Total length:				3:18

== Controversy ==
After the first look of the film was released, Rana Daggubati quickly took to his Twitter account, claiming that producer Rajarajan had defaulted on his payments and was using the announcement of the event as a way to raise money and cheat more people. Daggubati also claimed that the film's status was "unfinished". In response to these accusations, Rajarajan replied to Daggubati on Twitter that it is the director's prerogative to make the final decision whether the film is completed or not. Daggubati replied with a thumbs-up emoji and did not continue the conversation.

== Release ==
1945 was released theatrically on 7 January 2022. Earlier, the film was scheduled to be released on 24 January 2020. However, owing to financial differences between the producer and the lead actor, its release was delayed indefinitely. Later, it was scheduled to release on 31 December 2021 before moving to the present date.

The Tamil version was premiered directly on the streaming platform Astro Vaanavil in mid-2022.

== Critical reception ==
Srivathsan Nadadhur of OTTplay gave 1 out of 5 stars and wrote that "1945 is a film that's best erased from your memories. Just behave it didn't even release or exist and you're still not going to miss much. Don't get misled by the big names. The only thing big about the film is that it's one giant bore."
