= Avan Ivan (soundtrack) =

- Original CD cover

Soundtrack album by Yuvan Shankar Raja
- Released: 18 April 2011
- Recorded: 2010–2011
- Studios: Prasad Studios, Chennai; Sasi Studios, Chennai
- Genre: Feature film soundtrack
- Length: 23:56
- Language: Tamil
- Label: Sony Music India
- Producer: Yuvan Shankar Raja

Yuvan Shankar Raja chronology
Jolly Boy (2011)	Avan Ivan (2011)	Mankatha (2011)

The soundtrack for the 2011 Tamil-language film Avan Ivan features five songs composed by Yuvan Shankar Raja and lyrics written by Na. Muthukumar. The film, starring Vishal and Arya, is directed by Bala and produced by AGS Entertainment. The soundtrack accompanies ethnic instrumentation with elements of folk and orchestral music which had been recorded live. The album was released by Sony Music India on 18 April 2011 and met with positive reviews from critics.

== Development ==
Bala's norm collaborator Ilaiyaraaja was initially considered to be scoring the film, but the former chose his son Yuvan Shankar Raja as the composer; he felt that since Avan Ivan was a youth-centric film, Yuvan would bring the right feel to the music. It is the second collaboration between Yuvan and Bala following Nandhaa (2001).

Yuvan refrained from using Western musical elements such as synths and auto-tune, his usual style of compositions. Instead he went ahead with ethnic Indian sounds, and further disclosed that the entire album and score was recorded live. Yuvan recorded the orchestral portions in one take, after few rehearsals, inspired from Ilayaraaja's work. On Independence Day (15 August 2010), he recorded an intense pathos song ("Mudhal Murai") with vocals by Vijay Prakash. The following month, he recorded several different Indian folk drums with 40 people. Yuvan revealed that he was given over two months time for composing each song, while Bala later commented that his work was of "international standard". Na. Muthukumar penned the lyrics for all the tracks. The song "Oru Malayoram" featured vocals by children Priyanka, Srinisha Jayaseelan and Nithyashree, who were participants in the second season of the reality-based singing-competition Airtel Super Singer Junior.

== Release ==
The soundtrack rights were acquired by Sony Music India. Yuvan handed the master recording of the album on 18 March 2011. The soundtrack album was released exactly one month later, on 18 April 2011 by Bala's mentor Balu Mahendra in a grand event held at the Residency Towers, Chennai. However, the songs had been leaked to the internet few days before the official release, after Sony Music had sent the master copies to abroad earlier.

Only one songs from the soundtrack, "Dia Dia Dole", was used in its entirety, along with an altered shorter version of "Rasathi", parts of "Mudhal Murai" and a small bit song "Adi Kavakara Kiliye" as of 1 minute. While "Avanapathi" and "Oru Malayoram" were completely left out from the film. The film, however, featured two additional tracks, which not included in the soundtrack.

== Track listing ==
All lyrics are written by Na. Muthukumar.

No.	Title	Singer(s)	Length
1.	"Rasathi"	Haricharan	4:53
2.	"Dia Dia Dole"	Suchitra	4:02
3.	"Oru Malayoram"	Vijay Yesudas, Priyanka, Srinisha Jayaseelan, Nithyashree	5:43
4.	"Mudhal Murai"	Vijay Prakash	3:37
5.	"Avanapathi"	T. L. Maharajan, Sathyan	5:41
6.	"Adi Kavakara Kiliye"	Sathyan	1:16
Total length:			23:56

== Reception ==
The album received positive reviews from music critics. Pavithra Srinivasan from Rediff gave 3 out of 5 stars, saying, "Yuvan has voluntarily tried to move out of his comfort zone, given up on his template and experimented, particularly with the instrumental arrangement and most times, it works." Karthik Srinivasan of Milliblog wrote, "Yuvan nails the sound perfectly in Avan Ivan". Malathi Rangarajan of The Hindu called that "Yuvan's re-recording is a definite plus" except for the climatic sequence. Reviewer based at CNN-IBN stated that, "Yuvan Shankar Raja's background score is effective while his songs do not make much impact".

== Accolades ==
Award	Date of ceremony (Note: Date is linked to the article about the awards held that year, wherever possible.)	Category	Recipient(s) and nominee(s)	Result	Ref.
Mirchi Music Awards South	4 August 2012	Upcoming Female Vocalist of the Year	Priyanka, Srinisha Jayaseelan and Nithyashree for "Oru Malayoram"	Won	
