= Leesha Eclairs =

Indian actress

- Born: Chennai, Tamil Nadu
- Occupation: Actress
- Years active: 2016–present

Leesha Eclairs is an Indian television and film actress who has primarily worked in Tamil productions.

== Career ==
Leesha Eclairs completed her studies at Ethiraj College for Women, before taking up acting. In late 2016, she was simultaneously working on seven film projects. The most prominent of the seven, and her first release, was Balle Vellaiyathevaa (2016), where she portrayed the daughter of the antagonist in the film. Other ventures included the unreleased horror My Dear Lisa opposite Vijay Vasanth, and the comedy drama Sirikka Vidalama alongside Nithin Sathya. She has also appeared among an ensemble cast in the social drama Podhu Nalan Karudhi (2019), portraying the love interest of Santhosh Prathap's character.

In October 2018, Leesha's first television series Kanmani began airing on Sun TV. The series featured her in the lead role, and Leesha shot scenes in Georgia and India for the project.

In 2022, Leesha was seen in Sathyasiva's bilingual period film 1945, where she portrays a traditional South Indian girl. In the romantic drama Priyamudan Priya, she appears in the titular role.

== Filmography ==
=== Television ===
Year	Name	Role	Language	Notes
2018 - 2020	Kanmani	Soundarya Kannan	Tamil	

=== Films ===
Year	Film	Role	Language	Notes
2016	Balle Vellaiyathevaa	Priya	Tamil	
2019	Podhu Nalan Karudhi	Napoleon's love interest	Tamil	
2022	1945	Poorvi	Telugu; Tamil	
2023	Priyamudan Priya	Priya	Tamil	
2023	Jawan	Kalee's PA	Hindi	
