= Vettai (soundtrack) =

Soundtrack album by Yuvan Shankar Raja
- Released: 16 December 2011
- Recorded: 2010–2011
- Genre: Feature film soundtrack
- Length: 24:13
- Language: Tamil
- Label: Saregama
- Producer: Yuvan Shankar Raja

Yuvan Shankar Raja chronology
Rajapattai (2011)	Vettai (2011)	Mr. Nookayya (2012)

Singles from Vettai
- 1. "Pappappa" Released: 12 December 2011

Vettai is the soundtrack album composed by Yuvan Shankar Raja to the 2011 film of the same name directed by N. Lingusamy and produced by Thirrupathi Brothers and UTV Motion Pictures, starring Arya, R. Madhavan, Amala Paul and Sameera Reddy. The film featured five songs with lyrics written by Na. Muthukumar. The album was preceded with a single "Pappappa" which released on 12 December 2011, followed by the soundtrack release on 16 December, through the Saregama label. The music was positively reviewed by critics.

== Background ==
Yuvan Shankar Raja, who had previously collaborated with Lingusamy in Sandakozhi (2005) and Paiyaa (2010), had roped in for composing the music for Vettai. He was involved in the project during late-September 2010, and afterwards, Yuvan, Linguswamy and lyricist Na. Muthukumar left for Malaysia to compose the tunes. After recording the tracks, Yuvan mixed the songs in London, along with Rajapattai. Since their previous collaboration Paiyaa, had a successful soundtrack, Yuvan was concerned on not connecting with Vettai's music to Paiyaa, as both films were consisted of different genres. Yuvan described working with Lingusamy as a wonderful experience, adding:

"Both of us connect really well. He's the kind of director who gives me my space and is not too interfering. He just lets me do my job. It's been a smooth sailing mainly because we share a wonderful working equation. Plus, I know exactly what he wants."

Renu Kannan, a finalist of the reality-based singing competition Airtel Super Singer, collaborated with Yuvan for the song "Pappappa", along with "Paniye Pani Poove" from Rajapattai. The song also marked Yuvan performing a folk number for the first time, which he stated "It was a new experience for me, singing a folk number. But I must admit it was a lot of fun though." The song was initially considered to be an introductory number, but after recording, Lingusamy decided to include it in the later stage of the film.

== Marketing and release ==
Following the trend of releasing singles, which Yuvan initiated for his films Vaanam ("Evan Di Unna Pethan") and Mankatha ("Vilaiyaadu Mankatha") he also wanted to continue with the same trend for Vettai as well. In early-December, a song from the film "Pappappa" was planned to be released as a single as "the team felt that this number from the album had the potential to become a rage". It was released on 12 December 2011 at the studio of Radio Mirchi, along with a making-of video of the recording being simultaneously uploaded on YouTube. The video featured Arya, Madhavan, Lingusamy, Muthukumar and Yuvan, himself making it as the team song from the album; a strategy which initiated after the success of "Why This Kolaveri Di". The song eventually garnered attention and became very popular upon its release, garnering 200,000 views on YouTube within ten days and increased the expectations for the film.

The film's music was launched on 16 December 2011 at the Anna Centenary Auditorium in Kotturpuram, Chennai. Besides the film's cast and crew, the event further saw the attendance of actors Karthi, Vishal, Jayam Ravi, Jiiva, directors S. Shankar, Venkat Prabhu, R. K. Selvamani and other industry veterans. Besides being a music launch, the event was further held to felicitate Lingusamy as he completed 10 years in the film industry, since his directorial debut Aanandham released in 2001. At the event, Shankar was optimistic on Yuvan's music adding "The songs have come out very well, and Yuvan, as usual, has worked on his strength — coming up with peppy tunes", with Karthi, who had worked with the director-composer duo in Paiyaa, also admitted the same, saying "I'm sure the numbers in Vettai will turn out to be super hits".

== Critical reception ==
Rachel Saltz of The New York Times described it as "catchy" and "rhythmic". Critic based at Sify wrote: "Yuvan Shankar Raja's music is peppy and adds to the mood of the film. The opening song Tham, Tham.. and Kattipettai, Kattipettai… are hummable." Malathi Rangarajan of The Hindu stated that "vim and vigour mark the music of Vettai. Yuvan's peppy numbers add spice to the film that has Na. Muthukumar drawing attention with his lyric verses". Anupama Subramanian of Deccan Chronicle admitted that "Yuvan's songs are already an hit".

In contrast, Karthik Srinivasan of Milliblog described it as an "underwhelming package" from the composer. Pavithra Srinivasan of Rediff.com wrote "Yuvan Shankar Raja's songs, sadly, do not hit the bull's-eye here, despite his past track record with the director."

== Track listing ==
All lyrics are written by Na. Muthukumar.

No.	Title	Singer(s)	Length
1.	"Dham Dham"	Karthik, Krish	4:35
2.	"Damma Damma"	Haricharan, Shweta Mohan	4:51
3.	"Kattipidi Enna"	Vijay Prakash, Shweta Pandit	5:09
4.	"Pappappa"	Yuvan Shankar Raja, Renu Kannan	4:07
5.	"Thaiya Thakka"	Harini, Saindhavi	5:22
Total length:			24:13
