= Sivappu =

2015 Indian film by Sathyasiva

- Theatrical release poster
- Directed by: Sathyasiva
- Produced by: Muktha R. Govind; Punnagai Poo Gheetha
- Starring: Naveen Chandra; Rupa Manjari; Rajkiran
- Cinematography: Madhu Ambat
- Edited by: Mu. Kasi Viswanathan
- Music by: N. R. Raghunanthan
- Production companies: Muktha Films; SG Films Pvt Ltd
- Distributed by: Thuvar G. Chandrasekharan
- Release date: 16 October 2015
- Country: India
- Language: Tamil

Sivappu (transl. Red) is a 2015 Indian Tamil language crime drama film directed by Sathyasiva and produced by Muktha Films and Punnagai Poo Gheetha. Evoking the plight of Sri Lankan Tamil refugees in India, the film stars Rajkiran, Naveen Chandra and Rupa Manjari with music composed by N. R. Raghunanthan.

== Cast ==
- Rajkiran as Konaar
- Naveen Chandra as Pandian
- Rupa Manjari as Parvathi
- Thambi Ramiah
- A. Venkatesh
- Selva as Politician
- Bose Venkat as Policeman
- Poo Ramu as Protester
- Halwa Vasu

== Production ==
Following the release of Kazhugu, Sathyasiva immediately began work on his next venture in April 2012 starting Andhi Mazhai Megam, a story revolving around the lives of Sri Lankan refugees who work as construction workers in Tamil Nadu. The director then chose to rename the film as Sivappu (Red), revealing that the title also denotes themes of love, anger, poverty, violence and communism. Production began in August 2012, with Telugu actor Naveen Chandra and Rupa Manjari picked to play the lead pair. Sathyaraj, Selva, Thambi Ramiah were also reported to be seen in pivotal roles, while cinematography was announced to be handled by Madhu Ambat, editing by Kasi Viswanath and music by C. Sathya.

The film progressed throughout late 2012 and 2013 with Rajkiran roped in to replace Sathyaraj and N. R. Raghunanthan taking over as the film's composer.

== Soundtrack ==
The soundtrack was composed by N. R. Raghunanthan.

Track listing
No.	Title	Singers	Length
1.	"Sadugudu Vizhiyil"	Hariharan	5:14
2.	"Oru Ganam Vaanum"	N. R. Raghunanthan	4:38
3.	"Kodhikudhu Manasu"	Karthik, Shreya Ghoshal	4:27
4.	"Kaduvala Paaru"	Velmurugan	3:48
5.	"Oru Ganam Vaanum" (Reprise)	Sriram Parthasarathy	4:40
Total length:			22:47

== Reception ==
The film opened to average reviews, with critics lauding the actors' performances along with Madhu Ambat's cinematography while complaining about the unconvincing blend of romance, comedy and drama.
