= Priyamudan Priya =

- Theatrical release poster
- Directed by: A. J. Sujith
- Written by: A. J. Sujith
- Produced by: A. J. Sujith; A. Banu
- Starring: Ashok Kumar; Leesha Eclairs; Suresh
- Cinematography: Sha
- Edited by: Idris K.
- Music by: Srikanth Deva
- Production company: Golden Glory Movies
- Distributed by: Nimo Productions
- Release date: 5 August 2023
- Country: India
- Language: Tamil

Priyamudan Priya (transl. With love, Priya) is a 2023 Indian Tamil-language drama film directed and produced by A. J. Sujith and starring Ashok Kumar and Leesha Eclairs in the lead roles. The film was released on 5 August 2023.

The film garnered attention for being the 100th film that music composer Srikanth Deva worked on.

== Cast ==
- Ashok Kumar as Markendeya
- Leesha Eclairs as Priya
- Suresh
- Thalaivasal Vijay
- Jeeva
- A. Venkatesh
- Baby Vedhika
- Baby Meera
- Vaibhavi Joshi

== Production ==
The film began production in September 2013, with a photoshoot held with Ashok Kumar and Rashmi Gautam. In May 2015, Srikanth Deva announced that the project would mark his 100th venture as a music composer. By July 2016, Rashmi had exited the project and been replaced by Leesha Eclairs, who worked on the films alongside her commitments on the unreleased Sirikka Vidalama and Podhu Nalan Karudhi (2019).

The film began release promotions, almost ten years after the launch, with a ceremony held to facilitate Srikanth Deva.

== Reception ==
Prior to its theatrical release, the film was shown at international film festivals including the PIFFA International Film Festival held in Malaysia. Ashok Kumar won the best actor award for his performance in the film at the ceremony.

The film was released on 5 August 2023 across theatres in Tamil Nadu. A Telugu dubbed version title Priyamaina Priya was released across Telangana and Andhra Pradesh on the same day. A critic from Dina Thanthi gave the film a mixed review noting that the film showed a "different tale of a girl stuck with a psychotic lover". A reviewer of the Telugu version noted it was "an engaging love story with thrilling elements".
