= Vaanam (soundtrack) =

Soundtrack album by Yuvan Shankar Raja
- Released: 30 March 2011
- Recorded: 2010–2011
- Venues: Prasad Studios, Chennai
- Genre: Feature film soundtrack
- Length: 23:25
- Language: Tamil
- Label: Venus Music
- Producer: Yuvan Shankar Raja

Yuvan Shankar Raja chronology
Kadhal 2 Kalyanam (2011)	Vaanam (2011)	Jolly Boy (2011)

Singles from Vaanam
- 1. "Evan Di Unna Pethan" Released: 1 December 2010

Vaanam is the soundtrack album composed by Yuvan Shankar Raja for the 2011 Tamil film of the same name directed by Krish and stars Silambarasan, Bharath, Anushka Shetty, Santhanam, Sonia Agarwal and Saranya Ponvannan. The film featured five songs with the lyrics of Silambarasan, Yuvan, Abhishek–Lawrence and Na. Muthukumar.

The song "Evan Di Unna Pethan" was released as the lead single from the album on 1 December 2010 and achieved significant commercial success. It received widespread popularity amongst youngsters while also drawing notable attention and criticism for its lyrics. The album was released on 30 March 2011 through the Venus Music label to positive reviews from critics.

== Background ==
Yuvan Shankar Raja was assigned to score music for Vaanam; he previously scored for Silambarasan's Manmadhan (2004), Vallavan (2006) and Silambattam (2008) whose albums being chartbusters. Silambarasan wrote lyrics for the song "Evan Di Unna Pethan", an "international level club mix" number that blended Tamil and English lyrics written by the composer himself. The composer duo Abhishek–Lawrence wrote and performed the song "Cable Raja"; the remaining tracks are written by Na. Muthukumar. Yuvan and Simbu went to Bangkok in early 2010, to compose the songs for the film.

== Release and marketing ==
=== Single ===
In an attempt to popularize the film and its music, the team launched the song "Evan Di Unna Pethan" as a single from the album. According to Sify, it was the first time, a single was released ahead of the film's audio launch. (Note: Though this was incorrect, the trend of releasing a single from the album was attempted first with Lesa Lesa (2003).) An event was supposed to be held at London on 17 October 2010, to release the single, but after numerous complications and delays, it was officially unveiled on 1 December 2010 at the Citi Center, Chennai. The song achieved massive popularity amongst youngsters and set tremendous records in sales and digital downloads. A Hindi version of the song was composed under the title "Kaun Hai Baap Tera", featuring Silambarasan in his Bollywood debut.

=== Music launch ===
The album was launched on 30 March 2011 at the Residency Towers in Chennai with the attendance of the cast and crew.

== Reception ==
The soundtrack received positive reviews from music critics. Pavithra Srinivasan of Rediff gave a two and a half out of five rating and said "Like some of Yuvan's most recent albums, Vaanam too, scores in some areas: the number Vaanam and Who am I. The rest fall into the Yuvan template, while the appeal of Evandi Unnai Pethan is almost purely its in-your-face lyrics. For those who hoped for melodious numbers, this one might prove a dampener". Vipin Nair of Music Aloud rated 6.75 out of 10 to the album and wrote "Yuvan Shankar Raja sticks to the regular Simbu template in Vaanam's soundtrack as well but fails to match the usual quality."

In contrast, R. Richard Mahesh of Behindwoods rated three out of five stars and wrote "Vaanam can be regarded as one of the Yuvan’s better compositions and it is sure to make high waves now." Karthik Srinivasan of Milliblog wrote "Despite all drawbacks, Vaanam remains a very listenable soundtrack". Malathi Rangarajan of The Hindu wrote "Thought-provoking lyrics from Na. Muthukumar (‘Who Am I?' in particular) and Yuvan Shankar Raja's foot-tapping score are the other accentuating features." Sify wrote "Music of Yuvan is just ok, but it is the background score which keeps you hooked to the narration."

== Impact ==
Following the success of "Evan Di Unna Pethan", filmmakers and music directors capitalized on the resurging trend of releasing singles before the music launch. Yuvan followed the similar strategy for Mankatha (2011), with Vijay Antony did the same for his film Naan and Dharan Kumar for Podaa Podi (both 2012), also starring Silambarasan.

== Controversy ==
Despite its success, the song "Evan Di Unna Pethan" faced opposition for its lyrics. A women's right organization in Chennai issued a statement against Silambarasan for the lyrics being "chauvinistic" and "demean women", and demanded to censor the song, albeit several prominent people from the film industry came in support for the actor. The debate against the misogynistic lyrics saw a resurgence after the Swathi murder case, with activists and cinephiles who speculated that the cinematic portrayals of women and romance in Tamil films deemed to be unrealistic and dangerous for women in real life situations. In May 2017, a video was published by three women police offers expressing their awareness about misogyny in films and used a snippet of the song "Evan Di Unna Pethan". The song "Evada Unna Petha" from the C. S. Amudhan-directorial Tamizh Padam 2 (2018) was named after this song and considered to be a spoof on it as well as the other "soup songs" in Tamil films.

== Track listing ==
No.	Title	Lyrics	Singer(s)	Length
1.	"Evan Di Unna Pethan"	Silambarasan, Yuvan Shankar Raja	Silambarasan, Yuvan Shankar Raja	5:54
2.	"Vaanam"	Na. Muthukumar	Yuvan Shankar Raja	3:46
3.	"Cable Raja"	Abhishek–Lawrence	Abhishek–Lawrence	4:01
4.	"Who Am I"	Na. Muthukumar	Benny Dayal	4:20
5.	"No Money No Honey"	Na. Muthukumar	Silambarasan, Andrea Jeremiah, Srikanth Deva	5:24
Total length:				23:25
