= Avalukkenna Azhagiya Mugam =

- Poster
- Directed by: Kesavan
- Produced by: Kathiravan
- Starring: Poovarasan; Anupama Prakash; Vicky Adhithyan; Siva; Vijay Karthick; Sathya; Nivisha; Rupashree
- Cinematography: V. Navaneethan
- Edited by: Gopi Krishna
- Music by: David Showrrn
- Production company: Kathiravan Studios
- Release date: 7 September 2018
- Country: India
- Language: Tamil

Avalukkenna Azhagiya Mugam (pronounced [aʋaɭukkenna aɻaɡija muɡam] transl. What a beautiful face she has) is a 2018 Indian Tamil-language romantic comedy film directed by Kesavan and starring newcomers Poovarasan, Anupama Prakash, Vicky Adhithyan, Siva, Vijay Karthick, Sathya, Nivisha and Rupashree.

== Cast ==
- Poovarasan as Krishna
- Anupama Prakash as Kavya
- Vicky Adhithyan as Arivazhagan
- Siva as Sabari
- Vijay Karthick as Ragavan
- Sathya as Sunitha
- Nivisha
- Rupashree
- Yogi Babu as Arivu's friend
- Ravi Venkatraman as Kavya's father
- Powerstar Srinivasan as Power Paandi
- T. P. Gajendran
- Subbu Panchu
- Anu Mohan
- Pandu
- Pondy Ravi
- Sampath Ram
- Nellai Siva
- Boys Rajan
- Indhu Ravi
- Vengal Rao
- Subbaraj

== Production ==
Director Kesavan previously worked as an assistant to Kathir and Kalanjiyam. The film's title is based on a song from Server Sundaram (1964). The film has four different romantic stories intertwined together. The film was initially conceived as a short film and was almost done shooting in March 2015.

== Reception ==
A critic from The Times of India wrote that "The movie, which is tipped as a romantic entertainer, doesn't offer anything which is required to impress the viewers". A critic from Cinema Express wrote that "If not for the bad romance in this romcom, Avalukkenna Azhagiya Mugam may have been far better". A critic from Times of India Samayam positively reviewed several aspects of the film.
