= Gopi Krishna (film editor) =

Indian film editor

- Occupation: Film editor
- Years active: 2012–present

Gopi Krishna is an Indian film editor, who has worked on Tamil language films. He made a breakthrough after his work in Mohan Raja's Thani Oruvan (2015) was well recognised.

== Career ==
Gopi Krishna's first project was Balaji Sakthivel's mystery film Vazhakku Enn 18/9 (2012), following which he received more opportunities to edit Tamil films. He had a career breakthrough after his work in Mohan Raja's Thani Oruvan (2015) was well recognised, and this subsequently led to him receiving bigger film offers from producers.

== Filmography ==
=== As editor ===
Year	Film	Language	Notes
2012	Vazhakku Enn 18/9	Tamil	
2012	Manam Kothi Paravai	Tamil	
2012	Raattinam	Tamil	
2012	Vavval Pasanga	Tamil	
2013	Kutti Puli	Tamil	
2013	Desingu Raja	Tamil	
2013	1000 Abaddalu	Telugu	
2014	Ner Ethir	Tamil	
2015	Vanna Jigina	Tamil	
2015	Thani Oruvan	Tamil	Nominated—Edison Award for Best Editor
2015	Jilla	Telugu	Dubbed version
2016	Dhilluku Dhuddu	Tamil	
2016	Azhahendra Sollukku Amudha	Tamil	
2017	Enakku Vaaitha Adimaigal	Tamil	
2017	Ennodu Vilayadu	Tamil	
2017	Dora	Tamil	
2017	Bongu	Tamil	
2017	Ivan Yarendru Therikiratha	Tamil	
2018	Mannar Vagaiyara	Tamil	
2018	Oru Kuppai Kathai	Tamil	
2018	Maniyaar Kudumbam	Tamil	
2018	Avalukkenna Azhagiya Mugam	Tamil	
2018	Sei	Tamil	
2019	Kazhugu 2	Tamil	
2019	Neeya 2	Tamil	
2019	Market Raja MBBS	Tamil	
2020	Maayanadhi	Tamil	
2022	1945	Tamil; Telugu	
2022	Yutha Satham	Tamil	
2023	Kulasami	Tamil	
2025	Rajabheema	Tamil	
