= Venket Ram =

Venket Ram is an Indian celebrity and fashion photographer, who has shot principal photography stills for several notable films as well as portfolios.

== Works ==
=== Annual calendar ===
Venket Ram, has recently started an annual calendar inspired by other brands such as Dabboo Ratnani and Kingfisher, and began photography for it 2010.

2011
Shots were taken in Chennai and Hyderabad of actors modelling with vintage cars. The calendar was launched by Mani Ratnam on 24 December 2010 with Udhayanidhi Stalin attending the event.

Actors and actresses featured in the calendar: Nagarjuna, Suriya, Vikram, Silambarasan, Karthi, Arya, Trisha Krishnan, Genelia D'Souza, Shriya Saran, Nayantara, Tamannaah Bhatia and Shruti Haasan.

2012

Actresses featured in the calendar: Trisha Krishnan, Richa Gangopadhyay, Priya Anand, Shriya Saran, Amy Jackson, Amala Paul, Samantha, Deeksha Seth, Genelia D'Souza, Sameera Reddy, Mamta Mohandas and Kajal Aggarwal.

Aadhavan, Aasal, Boss Engira Bhaskaran, Enthiran, Kanthaswamy, Madrasapattinam, Naan Mahaan Alla, Paiyaa, Pokkisham, Singam, Vaanam

2020

A series of photoshoots recreating Raja Ravi Varma paintings. Actresses featured in the calendar: Ramya Krishnan, Lakshmi Manchu, Chamundeswari, Lissy Lakshmi, Khushbu Sundar, Nadhiya, Priyadarsini Govind, Shruti Haasan, Shobana, Aishwarya Rajesh and Samantha Akkineni.

=== Magazines and brands ===
He has shot for magazines and brands including:

- Arun Ice Creams
- Chennai Silks (Anushka Shetty)
- Galatta
- Inbox 1305 (Shruti Haasan)
- Just For Women (Anu Haasan, Radhika, Shobana, Shriya Saran)
- Prince Jewellery
- Sathyam Cinemas (Vikram)
- Southscope (Genelia D'Souza, Mohanlal, Namitha, Trisha Krishnan, Shriya Saran Venkatesh, Vikram)
  - Calendar version: Bindu Madhavi, Lakshmi Rai, Reemma Sen
- Vivel (Trisha Krishnan)

He has photographed stills and the album cover of Yuvan Shankar Raja's promotional music video "I'll be there for you.
