= The Residency Group of Hotels =

Indian Hotel Chain

- Industry: Hospitality
- Number of locations: 6
- Area served: South India
- Key people: Ravi Appasamy (Chairman); Rohit Ravi (Group Managing Director); B. Gopinath (Chief Executive Officer)
- Parent: Appaswamy Real Estates Ltd.
- Website: https://www.theresidency.com/

The Residency Group of Hotels is a hotel chain in India, with luxury, business, and boutique hotels across the region. The group's parent company is the Chennai-based Appaswamy Real Estates Ltd., which was founded in 1959. The group forayed into the hospitality sector in 1991 and currently operates seven hotels in five locations with over 600 rooms. Ravi Appasamy acts as Chairman with Rohit Ravi as Group Managing Director. B. Gopinath handles all the hotels as Chief Executive Officer of The Residency Group.

The Residency Group of Hotels’ six properties are located in Chennai, Coimbatore, Puducherry, Rameswaram and Karur. Each hotel is centrally located. The distinguishing factor of the chain is its food and beverage operations, with its themed restaurants and bars. The Towers properties are the group’s 5-star luxury deluxe properties.

List of Hotels
Property	Star Rating	No. of Rooms
The Residency Towers Chennai	5 star	176
The Residency Chennai	4 star	112
The Residency Towers Coimbatore	5 star	135
The Residency Towers Puducherry	5 star	75
The Residency Towers Rameswaram	5 star	100
The Richmond Puducherry	3 star	14
The Residency Karur	3 star	49

== Brand ethos ==
As one of the earliest South Indian hotel chains, the brand has gone through a revival and rebranding to appeal to the new-age customer. Their investment in modern technology, intensive training and manpower has led this revival.

This rebranding was geared towards becoming more premium and guest-centric, and the change in Coimbatore from Hotel Residency to The Residency Towers signalled this shift towards a more premium experience. Their plans for expansion in Madurai and Mysore at prime locations are part of this effort.

== Post COVID-19 safety protocol ==
The Residency Group introduced heightened safety protocol at all their hotels during the COVID-19 pandemic. A ‘hygiene butler’ was appointed at each location as a one-point contact to customers asking for more details on sanitation measures taken up by the group.

In an interview with F&H Magazine in May 2020, COO B. Gopinath revealed other measures the group has taken to keep their spaces safe. Digital ID cards for check-in, thermal screening at the entrance, reduced seating at restaurants, and increased safety during airport pickups are just some of the measures the group has put in place.

With the restrictions on dining out, they introduced online gourmet delivery. This service aims to bring nosh from their luxury and premium hotels to the customer’s doorstep.

== Social initiatives ==
During the COVID-19 pandemic in 2020, The Residency Towers Chennai joined hands with other hotels in the city to feed stray dogs left starving during the lockdown. The hotel contributed 10–15 kilograms of fresh-cooked food daily towards this initiative, feeding close to 120 dogs a day.

== Residency Resorts Malé Private Ltd. ==
Residency Resorts Malé Private Ltd. was formed to open a resort on the Vommuli Island in Maldives in 2016 – The St. Regis Vommuli Resort, Maldives. The resort has 47 sea-facing cottages on the waters of Dhaal Atoll in Vommuli. Managed under the St.Regis name by Starwood Hotels & Resorts Worldwide Inc., Ravi Appasamy, Managing Director of Residency Resorts Malé Private Limited, says that this property marries the bespoke service of the St. Regis brand with the ‘barefoot luxury’ mentality of the Maldives.
