= Kanmani (TV series) =

2018 Indian TV series

- Genre: Soap opera
- Created by: Home Movie Makers Media
- Developed by: Anusha Vijayakumar
- Written by: Sujatha Vijayakumar; C. U. Muthuselvan; Pa. Raghavan
- Directed by: Sadhasivam Permuaal (1–441); P. Selvam (442–536)
- Starring: Sanjeev; Leesha Eclairs; Jishnu Menon
- Theme music composer: Sathyan Mahalingam, Surmukhi Raman and Regina.
- Opening theme: "Sethu Vechen Nenjukulla Aasaiya"
- Composer: C. Sathya
- Country of origin: India
- Original language: Tamil
- No. of seasons: 1
- No. of episodes: 536

Production
- Producers: Home Movie Makers; Anand Joy
- Editor: Singai V.Raju
- Camera setup: Saravanan
- Running time: 21–23 minutes per episode
- Production companies: Sun Entertainment; Home Movie Makers

Original release
- Network: Sun TV
- Release: 22 October 2018 – 28 November 2020

Kanmani is an Indian Tamil-language soap opera directed by P. Selvam and produced by Home Movie Makers. It aired on Sun TV from 22 October 2018 to 28 November 2020. It starred Sanjeev and Leesha Eclairs.

The story follows Kannan (Sanjeev) who is in love with his niece Soundarya (Leesha). After many misunderstandings and breakup with her boyfriend Akash (Jishnu Menon) and family rivalries, they get married and the family reconciles.

== Plot ==
Soundarya returns from a work-study program in Russia to seek her parents' approval to marry Akash. She asks help from her uncle Kannan, who has secretly loved her since he was a child, but he misunderstands her and they become engaged. When Kannan realizes the truth, he prioritizes Soundarya's happiness and walks out on their wedding day, becoming ostracized by the family. Kannan later explains and arrangements are made for Soundarya and Akash's wedding.

Akash's mother arrives for the wedding and forbids Kannan from attending. Kannan pleads to be allowed to perform the murai maman (literally 'method uncle') seer tradition, but he is thrown out of the wedding hall. Soundarya convinces Kannan to return but Akash's mother threatens to drink poison. Akash leaves with his mother, stopping the wedding. The tensions cause Soundarya's father Dharmadurai to suffer a heart attack; while he undergoes surgery, Soundarya apologizes to the family. Avoiding Akash, Soundarya tries to overcome her depression by working as a marketing manager at a dairy, but Akash unexpectedly joins the same company.

To escape a thug's threats, elderly farmer Veeraiyan moves to the village with his two daughters. One of them, Muthuselvi, falls in love with Kannan while he helps the family. She is unable to reveal this and becomes unhappy with Kannan's efforts to arrange her marriage. Soundraya's brothers-in-law (i.e.: the husbands of her sisters) hate Muthuselvi and spread rumours that Muthuselvi is in a relationship with Kannan to ruin her reputation. Angered at this malice, Kannan declares that he will marry Muthuselvi, who is overjoyed until she realizes that Kannan could never abandon his love for Soundarya. Muthuselvi tries to further ruin her own reputation so that Kannan will leave her to be with Soundarya.

Kumaresan, one of Soundraya's brothers-in-law, impregnates one of the village concubines who extorts money from him to keep it a secret. Struggling to make the payments, Kumaresan steals the jewels that Kannan had bought for Muthuselvi wedding. The concubine's relative reveals the whole sordid affair while selling the jewels, leading Dharmadurai to confront Kumaresan. Dharmadurai's heart falters and Kumaresan keeps him from his heart medication, resulting in his death.

While the family mourns Dharmadurai, Krishnaveni convinces her husband Rajadurai to succeed as the family patriarch in place of Kannan. Rajadurai does so and announces that Kannan will marry Soundarya, while his daughter Valarmathi will marry Akash. Everyone is shocked but accepts the decisions.

Preparations begin for the weddings, and Valarmathi is dismayed that Akash isn't as considerate as Kannan. To prevent their children from being upstaged, Krishnaveni and Akash's mother plot to poison Kannan, but Akash's mother drinks the poison and is hospitalized. Kannan considers postponing his wedding but Akash insists he continue, as Soundarya has already had two cancelled weddings. Despite obstacles, both couples are married.

On the wedding night, Kannan and Soundarya are very happy with each other but Akash is preoccupied with his mother's condition and refuses to be intimate with Valarmathi. Valarmathi doesn't understand this and accuses him of neglecting her, and he slaps her. Valarmathi decides to get revenge by killing herself in the morning. Kannan and Akash find her before she can commit suicide. Despite numerous attempts at reconciliation, Valarmathi refuses to be anything but hostile and Akash chases her away.

Soundarya becomes pregnant but has a miscarriage and is declared infertile. Muthuselvi agrees to be a secret surrogate mother for her. Kannan learns of this and, to everyone's surprise, Soundarya becomes pregnant again. He tries to arrange for Muthuselvi to be married to his friend, but her pregnancy is revealed and everyone is convinced that Kannan had an affair.

Kumaresan and Krishnaveni are arrested for killing Dharmadhurai. Krishnaveni escapes from jail and plots with Valarmathi to kill Kannan but fail several times. Akash plots to win back Valarmathi by pretending to marry his friend to make her jealous. This works, and Valarmathi changes her mind about making an enemy of the family. Krishnaveni also repents and makes peace with the family.

Kaali, a distant family member who looks like Kannan, attempts to kill Kannan and replace him to steal his property. When Soundarya and Muthuselvi learn about him and his plans, they quarrel, and Kaali pushes Muthuselvi to the ground. Muthuselvi goes into labour and gives birth to a baby boy. The birth is such a beautiful event that it convinces Kaali to abandon his plans and rejoin the family. With everyone reconciled, the show ends.

== Cast ==
=== Main ===
- Sanjeev Venkat as Kannan Viji's brother, Kaali
- Leesha Eclairs as Soundarya Kannan, Kannan's niece and later his wife
- Sambhavi Gurumoorthy as Muthuselvi Veeraiyan, Kannan's ex-fiancee
- Binny George as ganga

=== Recurring ===
- Jishnu Menon as Aakash, Soundaryas ex-boyfriend and Valarmathi husband
- Vindhuja Vikraman as Valarmathi (Episodes 1-112)
  - Haripriya Isai replaced Vindhuja as Valarmathi (Akash's wife) (Episodes 112-536)
- Poornima Bhagyaraj as Vijayalakshmi Dharmadurai a.k.a. Viji (Kannan's elder sister)
- L. Raja as Dharmadurai (episodes 1–243)
- Priya Prince (episodes 1-112) as Suganya Kathiresan
  - Sowmya replaced Prince as Suganya Kathiresan: Dharmadurai's elder daughter (episodes 113-536)
- Bharani Elangovan as Saranya Kumaresan: Dharmadurai's second daughter
- Iraa Agarwal as Vanathy Rajadurai (episodes 1–112)
  - Janani Pradeep replaced Agarwal as Vanathy Rajadurai (episodes 113–536)
- Soodhu Kavvum Sivakumar as Rajadurai
- Jeevitha as Santhini: Akash's maternal aunt
- Premi Venkat as Krishnaveni Rajadurai
- Ayyappan as Kathiresan
- Suresh Krishna as Kumaresan
- Bhagya as Dharini: Kumaresan's mother
- Thilla as Kumarasan's father
- Bharathi Kannan as Kathiresan's father
- Abinavya as Sneha (episodes 400–536)
- Jeeva as Pandikumar
- Anjali Rao as Ammu: Kaali's love interest
- Anitha Nair as Neelaveni
- Rajashekhar as Veeraiyan (Muthu's father)
- Keerthika as Thanga Selvi Veeraiyan
- Babitha as Doctor
- T. R. Omana
- Tejas Gowda as Police Officer
- Shanthi Williams

=== Special appearances ===
- Sandhya as Sandhya / Kanmani (Episodes 454–468)
- Amit Bhargav as Venu (episodes 455–467)
- Subalakshmi Rangan as Karthika (episodes 455–467)
- Rajavelu as Himself (episodes 455–467)

== Casting ==
- Actor Sanjeev who was the last seen in Zee Tamil's Yaaradi Nee Mohini was cast as Kannan.
- Poornima Bhagyaraj was cast as Vijayalakshmi, making her television series debut.
- In February 2019, Shambhavi Gurumoorthy, who was known for Thamarai which was her debut with Neelima Rani, was cast as Muthuselvi.
- Priya Prince was selected to the role of Suganya (Viji's daughter) who played an important role who was known for Tamil Kadavul Murugan
- Anitha Nair entered the show as the main antagonist of Unknown.
