= Bison Kaalamaadan (soundtrack) =

- Soundtrack album cover

Soundtrack album by Nivas K. Prasanna
- Released: 28 October 2025
- Recorded: 2024–2025
- Genre: Feature film soundtrack
- Length: 30:15
- Language: Tamil
- Label: Think Music
- Producer: Nivas K. Prasanna

Nivas K. Prasanna chronology
Bun Butter Jam (2025)	Bison Kaalamaadan (2025)	Kumki 2 (2025)
External audio
- Bison Kaalamaadan — Jukebox on YouTube

Singles from Bison
- 1. "Theekkoluthi" Released: 1 September 2025; 2. "Rekka Rekka" Released: 16 September 2025; 3. "Cheenikkallu" Released: 23 September 2025; 4. "Thennaadu" Released: 2 October 2025; 5. "Kaalamaadan Gaanam" Released: 9 October 2025

Bison Kaalamaadan is the soundtrack album to the 2025 Tamil-language sports action drama film of the same name directed by Mari Selvaraj and produced by Applause Entertainment and Neelam Studios, starring Dhruv Vikram. The album featured six songs with lyrics written by Mari himself and Arivu. The album was released through Think Music on 28 October 2025.

== Background and development ==
Nivas K. Prasanna composed the film score and soundtrack in his first collaboration with both Dhruv and Mari. Nivas recalled that he got the offer after a telephonic conversation with Mari expressing his desire to work with him. Mari contacted Nivas after listening to some of his tunes for a recent project. Upon his involvement, he said that it was easy to understand the film's setting and world as he grew up in Tirunelveli, Mari's birthplace but the collaboration was not seamless, recalling that Mari was not satisfied with the music even after showing him several tunes. Mari told him that there was music running inside his mind and has to figure what it is, which led to approach the film in an empty mind. He recalled that the discussion with Mari helped on retaining the soul of the songs in Bison, where he had to what the actors do, following the lead of the story and the director's vision.

"Theekoluthi" was sung by Prasanna, which ran for around six minutes. (Note: The actual song duration was around six minutes. Prasanna referred to the duration of the video which was around seven minutes long) He composed the song in a deep emotional mind space at that time, which resulted in its extensive length. Considering the duration of recent songs tailored for short-form videos, Prasanna added that the duration of a track had nothing to do with the quality, adding the song held the audience's attention. The song "Cheenikkallu" was composed within 10 minutes. He noted that Selvaraj wanted to use "Malarndhum Malaradha" from Pasamalar (1961) for a particular scene that he edited during the re-recording and intended to acquire the rights for the song. However, Prasanna was vehemently against it, on using another composer's work and insisted him that he would compose a song that suited the scene. This led him to compose "Cheenikkallu" which Selvaraj liked it.

On using his vocals for "Theekkoluthi", Prasanna added that he did not like singing his songs, as directors listened to his version of the song and adamant about retaining it. However, the use of other singers in the album, were also complicated as according to him, only a handful of them sing soulfully, which led him anxious at certain instances as he wanted to bring the soul within their voices, even though they do it with perfection, that would lead the composers to sing themselves. He complemented Chinmayi Sripada and Vijay Yesudas' singing for "Cheenikkallu" owing to their incredible depth, while working with other songs would lead him with back-and-forth discussions to get into the mood of the song.

== Release ==
The album was preceded by the first single "Theekkoluthi" was released on 1 September 2025. The second single "Rekka Rekka" was released on 16 September. The third single "Cheenikkallu" was released on 23 September. The fourth single "Thennaadu" was released on 2 October. The fifth single "Kaalamaadan Gaanam" was released on 9 October. The album was released on 28 October, consisting of all five singles in addition to an unplugged version of "Cheenikkallu".

== Track listing ==
All tracks are written by Mari Selvaraj except where noted.

Tamil
No.	Title	Singer(s)	Length
1.	"Theekkoluthi"	Nivas K. Prasanna	6:03
2.	"Rekka Rekka" (Additional lyrics by Arivu)	Arivu, Vedan	5:03
3.	"Cheenikkallu"	Chinmayi Sripada, Vijay Yesudas	5:57
4.	"Thennaadu"	Sathyan Mahalingam	5:01
5.	"Kaalamaadan Gaanam"	V. M. Mahalingam	4:57
6.	"Cheenikkallu" (Unplugged)	Nivas K. Prasanna	3:13
Total length:			30:15

All lyrics are written by Yanamandra Ramakrishna.

Telugu
No.	Title	Singer(s)	Length
1.	"Theerena"	Manuvardhan	6:03
2.	"Haddhe Lena"	A. Vallavan	5:03
3.	"Manchi Manasu"	Manuvardhan, Gayathri Suresh	5:57
4.	"Andala Graamam"	Manuvardhan	5:01
5.	"Swami Seva"	A. Vallavan	4:57
Total length:			27:02

== Reception ==
The album received critical acclaim from listeners who praised its composition and considered it a breakthrough for Nivas K Prasanna.

Sajin Shrijith of The Week wrote "What makes this entire canvas even more wholesome is Nivas K. Prasanna's score — mournful when it needs to be and rousing in moments of triumph." Arjun Menon of The Indian Express wrote "Nivas K. Prasanna's music is seamlessly woven into the narrative; even when used as inner monologues, the songs never feel misplaced." Divya Nair of Rediff.com wrote "Nivas K Prasanna's score almost becomes a character that sustains the momentum of the film even when the storytelling repeats or reclaims points already made earlier on."

Saibal Chatterjee of NDTV wrote "the musical score by Nivas K. Prasanna contributes handsomely to accentuating the tactility of the physical setting." Roopa Radhakrishnan of The Times of India wrote "Nivas K Prasanna's music doesn't try to stand out, instead it seamlessly blends into the film's world." Janani K. of India Today wrote that Prasanna's music "transport us back to the Thoothukudi belt and make us feel the freshness of the village and the rage of the people."

== Controversies ==
In September 2025, after the release of the song "Rekka Rekka", Mari Selvaraj faced backlash for platforming Vedan, who raps in the song, because the rapper was earlier accused by multiple women of sexual harassment and was under investigation for a rape case.

== Personnel ==
Credits adapted from Think Music:

- Music composer, producer, arranger and programmer: Nivas K. Prasanna
- Music supervisors: Hevin Booster, Alex Samuel Jenito, K. A. Surya Srihari
- Pre-mixing: Hevin Booster
- Additional programming: K. A. Surya Srihari, Sharan Kumar
- Recording studios: The Mystic's Room, Tara Studios, Reengara Studios, 2barQ Studios, 20db Sound Studios
- Engineers: K S Maniratnam, Manoj Kumar, Ashwin Krishna, Thanushree, Vishnu, Hariharan, Adarsh Narayanan
- Mixing and mastering: K S Maniratnam, Hevin Booster
- Studio manager: Nandha Gopal

Vocals

- Additional vocals: Nivas K Prasanna, Meenakshi Elayaraja
- Male Chorus: Shenbagaraj, Aravind Srinivas, Narayanan Ravishankar, Shridhar Ramesh, Sudharshan Ram, Sugandh Sekar, Abhijith Rao, Prasanna Adisesha, Vikram Pitty, Sugandh Sekar, Vignesh Narayanan, Sudharshan Ram
- Female chorus: Padmaja Sreenivasan, Aparna Harikumar, V U M Ayshwarya, Sivaranjini Chandramouli, Sriradha Bharath
- Backing vocals: Reshma Shyam
- Vocal production: Alex Samuel Jenito

Instruments

- Flute: Flute Navin
- Acoustic guitar, electric guitar and bass: Keba Jeremiah
- Cello: V. R. Sekar
- Violin: Akkarsh N Kashyap
- Whistle: Nikhil Mathew
- Trumpets and trombone: Rakesh M S
- Bass guitar: Aalap Raju
- Harmonies: Alex Samuel Jenito (arranger and conductor)
- Rhythm and percussions: Alex Samuel Jenito (conductor), Hevin Booster (additional programming), Shurthiraj, Kaviraj, Derick, David
- Nadaswaram: G. Padmanaban, N. Venkatesan, Mylai Karthikeyan
- Folk rhythms: Shruthiraj, Kiran, Kaviraj
- Taiko drums and tapes: Sruthiraj, Vikram, Derick
- Indian percussion: Sruthiraj
