= Savaale Samaali =

2015 Indian film by Sathyasiva

- Theatrical release poster
- Directed by: Sathyasiva
- Written by: Murugadoss
- Produced by: Arun Pandian; Kavitha Pandian; S. N. Rajarajan
- Starring: Ashok Selvan; Bindu Madhavi
- Cinematography: Shelvakumar
- Edited by: Ahamed
- Music by: Thaman S
- Production companies: K Productions; D Focus
- Release date: 4 September 2015
- Running time: 138 minutes
- Country: India
- Language: Tamil

Savaale Samaali (transl. Face the challenge) is a 2015 Indian Tamil-language romantic comedy film written and directed by Sathyasiva. The film stars Ashok Selvan and Bindu Madhavi while Nassar, Jagan, and Karunas play supporting roles. Produced by Arun Pandian, the film features music composed by Thaman S. The film was released on 4 September 2015, and did not perform well at the box office.

== Plot ==
Karthik gets a job at a television channel called Top TV which suffers from lack of viewership. He is attracted towards his sister Pooja's friend Divya and tries to impress her with the help of his colleague Billa, but she does not reciprocate his love. Meanwhile, the debt-ridden channel's boss Karunakaran tries to commit suicide and requests Karthik and Billa to find a way to get the channel to the top position and increase their overall TRP. The duo hits upon the idea of uniting lovers facing parental opposition through a reality show, but they fake the whole thing with koothu actors. Meanwhile, Divya asks Karthik to help unite a real couple whose fathers are powerful politicians, and how they succeed in uniting the couple forms the remainder of the plot.

== Cast ==
- Ashok Selvan as Karthik
- Bindu Madhavi as Divya
- Jagan as Billa
- Karunas as Karunakaran
- Nassar as Samuthirakani
- Swathy as Pooja
- M. S. Bhaskar as Elangovan
- Urvashi as herself
- Manobala as himself
- Nirosha as Anjali
- Vasu Vikram as Karthik's father
- Paravai Muniyamma as Karthik's grandmother
- Shamily Sukumar as Billa's proposed bride
- Preethi Das as the Top TV receptionist
- Bharathi Kannan as a koothu actor
- Cool Suresh as a koothu actor
- Subageetha as a koothu actress
- Niranjani Ashok as Shreya
- Azhagu as Azhagu
- Vaiyapuri
- Scissor Manohar
- Nellai Siva
- Ananth K. Jayachandran
- Arun Pandian in a cameo appearance
- Aishwarya in a special appearance in the song "Nallavana Kettavana"

== Production ==
Production began in June 2014. Lead actor Ashok Selvan revealed that he rejected over 40 scripts post the success of Thegidi (2014), before selecting this film. The film's title Savaale Samaali was revealed in late September, when filming was almost complete. Though the title was derived from a 1971 film, director Sathyasiva revealed that this film was unrelated to it.

== Soundtrack ==
The film features five tracks composed by Thaman S and lyrics were written by Snehan. The soundtrack album was leaked in late March 2015.

Karthik of Milliblog wrote, "The melodies lift and hold up this soundtrack". Sify rated the album 3/5 and called it an "impressive Thaman outing".

Track listing
No.	Title	Singers	Length
1.	"Ethanai Kavignen"	Karthik	4:40
2.	"Savaale Samaali"	Palakkad Sreeram	4:23
3.	"Penne Penne"	S. P. Charan	4:36
4.	"Nallavana Kettavana"	Anthony Daasan, L. R. Eswari	5:24
5.	"Yaaro Yaaro"	M. M. Manasi	4:33
Total length:			23:36

== Reception ==
M. Suganth of The Times of India wrote, "Savaale Samaali is a film that doesn't aim much. It wants the viewer to have a few laughs and leave the hall. There is farce but it is rather tame and never cutting-edge". Sudhir Srinivasan of The Hindu wrote, "I walked out feeling a tad let down. It was the disappointment of walking in to watch a movie, and getting a somewhat-funny stage play instead". Cinema Vikatan praised the cast performances and editing but criticised the music and felt the plot could have been more exciting and had better humour.
