= Ghibran Vaibodha =

Indian composer

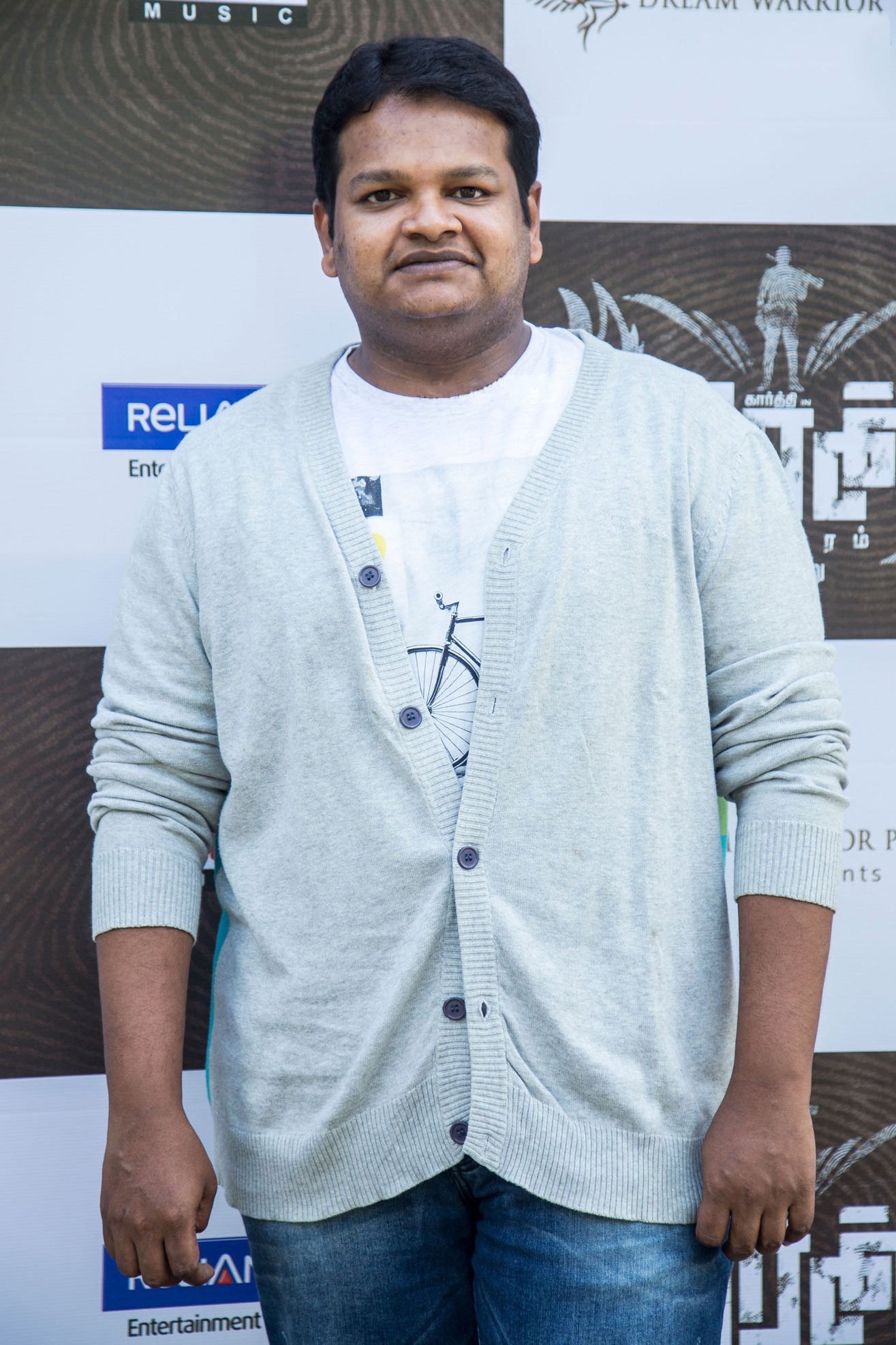
- Ghibran at Theeran Adhigaaram Ondru Press Meet

Background information
- Born: Mohammed Ghibran; August 12, 1980 (age 46); Coimbatore, Tamil Nadu, India
- Genre: Film score
- Occupations: songwriter, composer, record producer, music director, arranger, music producer
- Instruments: Keyboard, piano, guitar, accordion, harmonium, percussion
- Years active: 2000–present

Ghibran Vaibodha (born 12 August 1980) formerly known as Mohammed Ghibran, is an Indian composer. He has composed music for Indian films, advertising films and television commercial jingles.

== Early life ==
M. Ghibran was born on 12 August 1980, and raised in Coimbatore. When he was in the tenth grade, his family relocated to Chennai after his father suffered a severe loss in business. He had to discontinue studies and do several jobs to support his family.

Ghibran said that he had developed an interest in music after he had seen Yanni perform on TV, when he was about eight or ten. He had enrolled into a music college, but had to drop out and instead attended keyboard classes and learnt keyboard part-time from Paul Augustine. He completed RSA Grade 8 in both piano and music theory through Trinity College London, and obtained a degree in classical composition and film scoring under Australian Composer Lindsay Vickery at the LASALLE College of the Arts, Singapore. He received an offer to compose music for animations as an in-house composer, and worked there for two years. In 2000, he set up his own studio and over the next six years composed for over 700 ads.

In Singapore, he worked part-time composing music for media houses to meet his expenses. After completing his works, he worked for the Singapore wood and percussion instruments orchestra. He subsequently returned to India, but could not find many advertisements to work on there.

== Career ==
The director A. Sarkunam selected Ghibran to compose the soundtrack for Vaagai Sooda Vaa. N. Venkateswaran of The Times of India wrote of the soundtrack, "M Ghibran joins the list of debut composers who have impressed with their work in recent times. The music score complements the movie, and marks him out as a musician to watch out for". Malathi Rangarajan from The Hindu wrote that "Music is another highlight. M. Gibran's numbers keep ringing in your ears long after you leave the cinema". Rajagopalan Badrinarayanan from musicperk.com wrote "Vaagai Sooda Vaa is a wholesome package with wonderful songs. Being his first movie Gibran has done a great job with the musical score. The album will surely reshuffle the current chart". Ghibran said that after Vaagai Sooda Vaa and that he was then approached by several directors about other projects, but he decided to take a break to look for an urban based script.

In 2013, Ghibran composed the music for the films Vatthikuchi, Kutti Puli and Naiyaandi. His 2014 releases were Thirumanam Ennum Nikkah and Amara Kaaviyam. He also had his first Telugu release Run Raja Run. According to Behindwoods.com, his work in the film "garnered great appreciation from the fans" and the songs had been "in the top of the charts for a long time". He was offered soundtrack work for Vishwaroopam II by Kamal Haasan, as well as his next two projects, Uttama Villain and Papanasam, the Tamil remake of Drishyam.

Ghibran currently shuttles between Chennai, Mumbai and Singapore for all his recording works, and owns a studio in Chennai.

== Personal life ==
Ghibran is married to a Telugu woman from Vijayawada, a scientist, whom he met in Singapore. Their first child, a son was born on 18 December 2014. Ghibran's elder brother A. G. Amid is a director. In May 2024, Ghibran announced he had converted from Islam to Hinduism and changed his name to Ghibran Vaibodha; the name change had been implemented a year before.

== Discography ==
=== Films ===
Year	Title	Score	Songs	Language	Notes
2011	Vaagai Sooda Vaa	Yes	Yes	Tamil	Won, Vijay Award for Best Find of the Year; Won, Ananda Vikatan Magazine's Top 10 Nambikkaigal (Hopes) of 2011; Won, Mirchi Music Awards South for Best Upcoming Music Director; Won, BIG FM Melody Music Award for Best Debut Music Director; Won, Vijay Music Awards for Popular Melody of the Year; Nominated, Filmfare Award for Best Music Director – Tamil
2013	Vatthikuchi	Yes	Yes	Tamil	
2013	Kutti Puli	Yes	Yes	Tamil	
2013	Naiyaandi	Yes	Yes	Tamil	
2014	Thirumanam Ennum Nikkah	Yes	Yes	Tamil	Won, Mirchi Music Awards South for Best Album of the Year (Mirchi Listeners' Choice); Won, Zee Telugu Santosham Award for Best Music Director – Tamil
2014	Run Raja Run	Yes	Yes	Telugu	Telugu film Debut. Nominated, Filmfare Award for Best Music Director – Telugu
2014	Amara Kaaviyam	Yes	Yes	Tamil	
2015	Jil	Yes	Yes	Telugu	
2015	Uttama Villain	Yes	Yes	Tamil	Won, Los Angeles Independent Film Festival Award for Best Original Score; Won, Los Angeles Independent Film Festival Award for Best Song (For the Song "Iraniyan Naadagam"); Won, Russian International Film Festival Award for Best Original Music; Won, Platinum Award from International Independent Film Awards for Original Score; Won, Diamond Award from International Independent Film Awards for Original Song ("Iraniyan Naadagam"); Won, Diamond Award from International Independent Film Awards for Original Song ("Kaadhalaam"); Gold Winner, from Prestige Music Award for Original Song ("Kaadhalaam"); Silver Winner, from Prestige Music Award for Original Song ("Iraniyan Naadagam"); Won, Norway Tamil Film Festival Awards for Best Music Director; Won, Behindwoods Gold Medal for Best Music Director
2015	Papanasam	Yes	Yes	Tamil	Score reused in the Sinhalese remake Dharmayuddhaya.
2015	Thoongaavanam; Cheekati Rajyam	Yes	Yes	Tamil; Telugu	Bilingual film
2016	Babu Bangaram	Yes	Yes	Telugu	
2016	Hyper	No	Yes	Telugu	
2017	Adhe Kangal	Yes	Yes	Tamil	
2017	Ungarala Rambabu	Yes	Yes	Telugu	
2017	Magalir Mattum	Yes	Yes	Tamil	
2017	Aramm	Yes	Yes	Tamil	Released in Telugu as Karthavyam
2017	Theeran Adhigaaram Ondru	Yes	Yes	Tamil	Released in Telugu as Khakee
2017	Maayavan	Yes	Yes	Tamil	
2017	Chennai Singapore	Yes	Yes	Tamil	
2018	Vishwaroopam 2 Vishwaroop 2	Yes	Yes	Tamil; Hindi	Bilingual Film
2018	Aan Devathai	Yes	Yes	Tamil	
2018	Ratsasan	Yes	Yes	Tamil	Won, Raj TV award for Best Music Director; Won, LATCA Los Angeles Theatrical Release Competition & Awards for Best Music Score; Won, Oniros Film Awards for Best Soundtrack; Won, Diamond Film Awards for Best Original Score; Won, Best Sagrada Familia Soundtrack / Music score at Barcelona Planet Film Festival; Won, Los Angeles Film Awards for Best Film Score; Won, Hollywood International Moving Pictures Film Festival award for Best Music Score; Won, International Independent Film Awards (IIFA) for Best Original score Won, Latitude Film Awards for Original Score; Won, Starshine Film festival Award for Best Original Score; Won, East Europe International Film Festival(Part of Fusion International Film Festivals) Award for Best Original Score
2019	Athiran	Yes	No	Malayalam	Malayalam debut
2019	House Owner	Yes	Yes	Tamil	
2019	Kadaram Kondan	Yes	Yes	Tamil	
2019	Sixer	Yes	Yes	Tamil	
2019	Rakshasudu	Yes	Yes	Telugu	Remake of Ratsasan
2019	Saaho	Yes	No	Telugu, Hindi	
2019	Petromax	Yes	Yes	Tamil	
2019	Dhanusu Raasi Neyargale	Yes	Yes	Tamil	
2020	Aswathama	Yes	No	Telugu	
2020	Ka Pae Ranasingam	Yes	Yes	Tamil	
2021	Maara	Yes	Yes	Tamil	
2021	Kasada Thapara	Yes	Yes	Tamil	Anthology series – Scored music for "Arampatra" Chapter
2021	Jango	Yes	Yes	Tamil	
2022	Hero	Yes	Yes	Telugu	
2022	Sebastian P.C. 524	Yes	Yes	Telugu	
2022	Valimai	Yes	No	Tamil	
2022	Taanakkaran	Yes	Yes	Tamil	
2022	Koogle Kuttappa	Yes	Yes	Tamil	
2022	Home Minister	Yes	Yes	Kannada	
2022	Maha	Yes	Yes	Tamil	
2022	Dejavu	Yes	Yes	Tamil	
2022	Trigger	Yes	Yes	Tamil	
2022	Naan Mirugamaai Maara	Yes	Yes	Tamil	
2022	Pattathu Arasan	Yes	Yes	Tamil	
2022	Driver Jamuna	Yes	Yes	Tamil	
2023	Amigos	Yes	Yes	Telugu	
2023	Thunivu	Yes	Yes	Tamil	50th Film
2023	Hunt	Yes	Yes	Telugu	
2023	Thalainagaram 2	Yes	Yes	Tamil	
2023	80s Buildup	Yes	Yes	Tamil	
2024	Kurangu Pedal	Yes	Yes	Tamil	
2024	Weapon	Yes	Yes	Tamil	
2024	Boat	Yes	Yes	Tamil	
2024	Miss You	Yes	Yes	Tamil	
2025	DNA	Yes	No	Tamil	
2025	JSK: Janaki V v/s State of Kerala	Yes	Yes	Malayalam	
2025	Rambo	Yes	Yes	Tamil	
2025	Aaryan	Yes	Yes	Tamil	
2025	Others	Yes	Yes	Tamil	
2026	Leader	Yes	Yes	Tamil	
2026	Angikaaram	Yes	Yes	Tamil	
2026	Freedom †	Yes	Yes		

=== Television ===
Year	Title	Channel	Notes
2022	Irai	Aha Tamil	

=== Independent works and music videos ===
Year	Title	Language	Artist	Notes
2021	Veera Vanakkam	Tamil		This song was released by the Chief Minister of Tamil Nadu, MK Stalin marking the special occasion of Police Commemoration Day.
2021	Achamae Agandruvidu	Tamil	Vocals by Shruti Haasan and Ramya NSK	Sai Kumar's direction and Vairamuthu lyrics from Album called "Naatpadu Theral"
2020	Arivum Anbum	Tamil	Anirudh Ravichander, Yuvan Shankar Raja, Devi Sri Prasad, Shankar Mahadevan, Shruti Haasan, Bombay Jayashree, and many other well-known singers have taken part in the project.	The actor-politician talks about his new virtually-conceived project to spread positivity during the global lockdown. Kamal Haasan is trying to spread hope through music.
2020	Salaam Chennai	Tamil	Cricketers Murali Vijay, Harbhajan Singh, Suresh Raina and L. Balaji are featured in the short film, which was made by Happy Unicorn and was released by Think Music.	‘Salaam Chennai’ salutes the work put in by frontline workers and stresses the need to prevent the spread of COVID -19 by wearing masks, maintaining physical distance, and through personal hygiene.
2019	Nee Illama Video	Tamil		5th track from #7UPMadrasGigS2 in collaboration with Sony Music India
2018	Get Your Freaking Hands Off Me	English, Tamil, Hindi		Launched by Kamal Haasan at Jeppiaar Engineering College.
2017	Kalam Salaam	Tamil		Salaam Kalam, has been penned by Vairamuthu.

== Awards ==
Year	Awards	Category	Film	Result
2010	Vijay Award	Best Find of the Year	Vaagai Sooda Vaa	Won
2010	Ananda vikatan Magazine's	Top 10 Nambikkaigal (Hopes) of 2011	Vaagai Sooda Vaa	Won
2010	Mirchi Music Awards South	Best Upcoming Music Director	Vaagai Sooda Vaa	Won
2010	BIG FM Melody Music Award	Best Debut Music Director	Vaagai Sooda Vaa	Won
2010	Vijay Music Awards	Popular Melody of the Year	Vaagai Sooda Vaa	Won
2010	Filmfare Award	Best Music Director	Vaagai Sooda Vaa	Nominated
2014	Mirchi Music Awards	Best Album of the Year	Thirumanam Ennum Nikkah	Won
2014	Zee Telugu Santosham Award	Best Music Director	Thirumanam Ennum Nikkah	Won
2014	Filmfare Award	Best Music Director	Run Raja Run	Nominated
2015	Los Angeles Independent Film Festival Award	Best Original Score	Uttama Villain	Won
2015	Los Angeles Independent Film Festival Award	Best Song (For the Song "Iraniyan Naadagam")	Uttama Villain	Won
2015	Russian International Film Festival Award	Best Original Music	Uttama Villain	Won
2015	Platinum Award from International Independent Film Awards	Original Score	Uttama Villain	Won
2015	Diamond Award from International Independent Film Awards	Original Song ("Iraniyan Naadagam")	Uttama Villain	Won
2015	Diamond Award from International Independent Film Awards	Original Song ("Kaadhalaam")	Uttama Villain	Won
2015	Prestige Music Award	Original Song ("Kaadhalaam")	Uttama Villain	Gold Winner
2015	Prestige Music Award	Original Song ("Iraniyan Naadagam")	Uttama Villain	Silver Winner
2015	Norway Tamil Film Festival Awards	Best Music Director	Uttama Villain	Won
2015	Behindwoods Gold Medal	Best Music Director	Uttama Villain	Won
2018	Raj TV award	Best Music Director	Ratsasan	Won
2018	LATCA Los Angeles Theatrical Release Competition & Awards	Best Music Score	Ratsasan	Won
2018	Oniros Film Awards	Best Soundtrack	Ratsasan	Won
2018	Diamond Film Awards	Best Original Score	Ratsasan	Won
2018	Barcelona Planet Film Festival	Best Sagrada Familia Soundtrack / Music score	Ratsasan	Won
2018	Los Angeles Film Awards	Best Film Score	Ratsasan	Won
2018	Hollywood International Moving Pictures Film Festival award	Best Music Score	Ratsasan	Won
2018	International Independent Film Awards (IIFA)	Best Original score	Ratsasan	Won
2018	Latitude Film Awards	Original Score	Ratsasan	Won
2018	Starshine Film festival Award	Best Original Score	Ratsasan	Won
2018	East Europe International Film Festival Award	Best Original Score	Ratsasan	Won
