= Bindu Madhavi =

Indian model and actress

- Born: 14 June 1986 (age 40); Devarintipalli, Nallacheruvu, Andhra Pradesh, India
- Education: Vellore Institute of Technology
- Occupations: Actress; model
- Years active: 2008–present

Bindu Madhavi (born 14 June 1986) is an Indian actress and model, who works in Tamil and Telugu films and television. She is winner of Bigg Boss OTT Telugu season 1. After starting her acting career in Telugu cinema, she ventured into Tamil cinema where she was part of several successful productions including Kazhugu (2012), Kedi Billa Killadi Ranga (2013), Tamizhuku En Ondrai Azhuthavum (2015) and Pasanga 2 (2015). In 2022, she emerged as the title winner of the inaugural Bigg Boss Non-Stop and became the first female winner of the Telugu Bigg Boss franchise.

== Early life ==
Bindu Madhavi was born on 14 June 1986 in Madanapalle, Andhra Pradesh. Her father was a deputy commissioner in commercial tax department, due to which, her family moved to various places including Tirupati, Nellore, Guntur, Tenali, Vijayawada and Hyderabad, before settling in Chennai, Tamil Nadu, where she did her studies. She completed her degree in Biotechnology from Vellore Institute of Technology. She has stated that she plans to pursue a Master's in Biotechnology abroad and land a job in the field later. Madhavi also had one brother, Sagar, who died in 2012.

== Career ==
While in college, she started modelling, with her first assignment being for Versace in Los Angeles. She had the desire to act in films but her family was strictly against her entering the film industry, with Bindu citing that her father did not speak to her for eight months and that her mother too was upset. She met celebrity photographer Venket Ram in Chennai who agreed to do a portfolio shoot for her. She stated that Venket Ram was "amazingly helpful", as he gave her advice and that he was "the closest to a godfather I have in tinsel town". She did more modelling and went on to appear in television ads and as a result of her work in a Tata Gold Tanishq advertisement, she was auditioned and selected by noted Telugu director Sekhar Kammula to act in his production, Avakai Biryani (2008), while she also landed a supporting role in Cheran's Tamil romantic drama film Pokkisham (2009). Her other release of 2009 was Bumper Offer, opposite Sairam Shankar, which was produced by noted director Puri Jagannadh.

In 2010, Bindu's first release was Om Shanti, which featured an ensemble cast of Kajal Aggarwal, Navdeep, Nikhil Siddharth and Madhavan. She then worked with producer Dil Raju for Rama Rama Krishna Krishna (2010) alongside Ram and Arjun, where she portrayed a village-based girl. She was later signed by director Gautham Vasudev Menon for his production Veppam (2011) that was directed by his associate Anjana Ali Khan, and featured her in the role of a sex worker. The film earned mixed reviews but critics praised Bindu's performance, with a reviewer from Rediff.com stating she "does very well and manages to engage our interest". After Veppam, Bindu shifted her focus to the Tamil industry as she received more Tamil film offers. Her next Tamil release was Sathyasiva's Kazhugu (2012), a success at the box office. Likewise, her next three releases, the comedy films Kedi Billa Killadi Ranga (2013), Desingu Raja (2013) and Varuthapadatha Valibar Sangam (2013) were also commercially successful films. She stated that Kazhugu and Kedi Billa Killadi Ranga were "two films that changed my life".

Her first 2014 release was Chimbu Deven's Oru Kanniyum Moonu Kalavaniyum, in which she played Malar, the protagonist's friend. She said that she was given the option to choose between the roles of the protagonist's friend or his lover and chose the former as she felt "there was more scope to act". In 2015, she experienced further box office success with Tamizhuku En Ondrai Azhuthavum, but the romantic comedy Savaale Samaali did not fare as well. She was then cast by Pandiraj for the second time in Suriya's home production, Pasanga 2 (2015), where she portrayed the mother of a young child. The film opened to critical and commercial acclaim, with Bindu's performance being appreciated. She later worked on films including the horror comedy Jackson Durai (2016) and the village drama Pakka (2018), opposite Vikram Prabhu.

In 2017, Bindu took part in the Tamil reality show, Bigg Boss hosted by Kamal Haasan and entered the show on day 35, finishing in fifth place. Post her appearance on the show, Bindu attracted more work for commercials, films, and promotional events. She is currently working on film projects including Pagaivanuku Arulvai and Mayan. In 2022, Bindu Madhavi entered the digital version of the Telugu reality show Bigg Boss, titled Bigg Boss Non-Stop and emerged as its title winner, thus becoming the first female winner of the Bigg Boss franchise.

== Filmography ==
Key
†	Denotes films that have not yet been released

=== Film ===
- All shows are in Tamil unless otherwise noted.

List of films and roles
Year	Title	Role	Language	Notes	Ref.
2008	Avakai Biryani	Lakshmi Jandhyala	Telugu		
2009	Pokkisham	Anjali	Tamil		
2009	Bumper Offer	Aishwarya	Telugu		
2010	Om Shanthi	Noorie	Telugu		
2010	Inkosari	Shailaja	Telugu	Guest appearance	
2010	Rama Rama Krishna Krishna	Nandu	Telugu		
2010	Prathi Roju	Bhanu	Telugu		
2011	Veppam	Viji	Tamil		
2011	Pilla Zamindar	Amrutha	Telugu		
2012	Kazhugu	Kavitha	Tamil		
2012	Sattam Oru Iruttarai	Diya	Tamil		
2013	Kedi Billa Killadi Ranga	Mithra Meenalochani	Tamil		
2013	Desingu Raja	Thamarai	Tamil		
2013	Varuthapadatha Valibar Sangam	Kalyani	Tamil	Guest appearance	
2014	Oru Kanniyum Moonu Kalavaniyum	Malar	Tamil		
2015	Tamizhuku En Ondrai Azhuthavum	Simi	Tamil		
2015	Savaale Samaali	Divya	Tamil		
2015	Pasanga 2	Vidya Akhil	Tamil		
2016	Jackson Durai	Viji	Tamil		
2018	Pakka	Nadhiya	Tamil		
2019	Kazhugu 2	Merly	Tamil		
2024	Mayan	Devi	Tamil		
2025	Blackmail	Archana	Tamil		
2025	Dhandoraa	Sreelatha	Telugu		
TBA	Yaarukum Anjael †	TBA	Tamil	Post-production	
TBA	Pagaivanuku Arulvai †	TBA	Tamil	Filming	

=== Television ===
Year	Title	Role	Language	Network	Notes	Ref.
2007–2011	Magal	Uncredited Role	Tamil	Sun TV		
2017	Bigg Boss Tamil 1	Contestant	Tamil	Star Vijay	4th Runner-Up	
2020	Masti's	Gowri	Telugu	Aha		
2022	Bigg Boss Non-Stop	Contestant	Telugu	Hotstar	Winner	
2023	Anger Tales	Radha	Telugu	Disney+ Hotstar		
2023	Newsense	Neela	Telugu	Aha		
2023	Mansion 24	Madhavi	Telugu	Disney+ Hotstar		
2024–present	Paruvu	Queen Kavya	Telugu	ZEE5	Extended cameo appearance	
2025--present	Bigg Boss Agni Pariksha	Judge	Telugu	Star Maa/JioHotStar		
