= Sathyasiva =

Indian film director

- Occupation: Director
- Years active: 2012—present
- Spouse: Sivaranjani Siva

Sathyasiva is an Indian film director who has worked on Tamil films. After making his debut with the sleeper hit Kazhugu (2012), he has gone on to direct Sivappu (2015) and Savaale Samaali (2015).

== Career ==
Sathyasiva made his directorial debut with Kazhugu (2012), a film about people who recover bodies of suicide victims who jump off cliffs, with Kreshna and Bindu Madhavi forming the lead cast. The film, upon release, fetched mixed reviews. A reviewer from Sify.com said Kazhugu was a "realistic romantic thriller that seldom loses its grip on your attention. Credible performances from its leads, a nail-biting screenplay along with a fresh milieu makes it an engaging film". The Times of India gave it 3.5 out of 5, claiming that it was "gripping from start to finish". Likewise, Malathi Rangarajam from The Hindu wrote: "It's heartening to see young filmmakers daring to steer clear of stereotypes. S. Sathyasiva who makes his bow with Kazhugu is the latest in this category". The critic further cited that director Sathyasiva was "a director to watch out for".

Following the release of Kazhugu, Sathyasiva immediately began work on his next venture in April 2012 starting Andhi Mazhai Megam, a story revolving around the lives of Sri Lankan refugees who work as construction workers in Tamil Nadu. The director then chose to rename the film as Sivappu (2015), revealing that the title also denotes themes of love, anger, poverty, violence and communism. Production began in August 2012, with Telugu actor Naveen Chandra and Rupa Manjari picked to play the lead pair, but delays meant that the film only had a theatrical release in October 2015, becoming his third film. The film opened to average reviews, with critics lauding the actors' performances along with Madhu Ambat's cinematography while complaining about the unconvincing blend of romance, comedy and drama.

During the period when Sivappu was stuck, Sathyasiva began pre-production work on Thalapakatti with Vikram Prabhu, Nazriya Nazim and Rajkiran in the lead roles. A remake of the Malayalam film Ustad Hotel, the film developed throughout late 2013, before being dropped. Sathyasiva then made a comedy film titled Savaale Samaali (2015) featuring Ashok Selvan and Bindu Madhavi. The film opened to mixed reviews, but performed poorly at the box office. In 2019, Sathyasiva directed Kazhugu 2, a sequel to Kazhugu, which received below average reviews.

After Sivappu, Sathyasiva started working on an untitled war film with Jiiva in the lead role, set in the backdrop of 1942. However, Jiiva had other projects, and Rana Daggubati was chosen to play the lead role in what would become the 2022 Tamil-Telugu bilingual film 1945. The film began production in 2016 but was left unfinished due to differences between Rana and the film's producer S. Rangarajan. The film released to negative reviews. Later in 2022, Sathyasiva directed the action thriller film Naan Mirugamaai Maara, starring Sasikumar.

== Filmography ==
Year	Film	Notes
2012	Kazhugu	
2015	Savaale Samaali	
2015	Sivappu	
2019	Kazhugu 2	
2022	1945	Simultaneously shot in Telugu
2022	Naan Mirugamaai Maara	
2025	Freedom	
TBA	Bell Bottom	Post production
2026	Aivu	Direction
