= Podhu Nalan Karudhi =

2019 Indian film by Zion

- Film poster
- Directed by: Zion
- Written by: Zion
- Produced by: AVR Anbuvelrajan
- Starring: Karunakaran; Santhosh Prathap; Adith Arun
- Cinematography: Suwaminathan
- Edited by: Greyson A.C.A
- Music by: A. Hariganesh
- Distributed by: PT Selvakumar
- Release date: 7 February 2019
- Country: India
- Language: Tamil

Podhu Nalan Karudhi (lit. 'Considering the interest of public') is a 2019 Tamil action film written and directed by Zion and produced by AVE Anbuvelrajan. The film features Karunakaran, Santhosh Prathap and Adith Arun in the leading roles. The music was composed by A. Hariganesh with cinematography by Suwaminathan. The film was released on 7 February 2019.

== Cast ==
- Karunakaran as Poovarasan
- Santhosh as Napoleon
- Adith Arun as Kannan
- Yog Japee as Uthiram
- Anu Sithara as Poovarasan's love interest
- Subiksha as Kannan's love interest
- Leesha Eclairs as Napoleon's love interest
- Imman Annachi as Vadivu
- Muthazhagan as Amber

== Production ==
Zion initially approached Santhosh Prathap and Ashok Selvan to play the lead roles, but the latter was later replaced by Adith Arun. Actresses Anu Sithara and Leesha also joined the cast in July 2016. The film began production during July 2016 and was completed after being shot over fifty consecutive days.

== Soundtrack ==
Music composed by Hariganesh.

- "Nee Ondrum Karpodu" - Hariganesh

== Reception ==
Thinkal Menon of The Times of India opined that "The raw portrayal of money lending in the city by Zion was a good attempt, but the execution, which involves some over-the-top sequences made the premise insipid. A few thrilling moments and more appealing characterisations would have made it a better watch". Avinash Ramichandran of The New Indian Express wrote that "The characters are interesting, no doubt, but the making is uninspiring".
