= N. B. Srikanth =

Indian film editor

N. B. Srikanth is an Indian film editor, working primarily in the Tamil film industry. He worked along with Praveen K. L. in various successful films.

== Filmography ==
- 2007: Chennai 600028
- 2008: Saroja
- 2009: Kunguma Poovum Konjum Puravum
- 2009: Vedigundu Murugesan
- 2009: Kanthaswamy
- 2009: Kasko (Telugu)
- 2010: Naanayam
- 2010: Goa
- 2010: Gurushetram - 24 Hours of Anger
- 2010: Kaadhal Solla Vandhen
- 2010: Nagaram
- 2010: Kanimozhi
- 2010: Oru Nunna Katha (Malayalam)
- 2011: Pickles (Malayalam)
- 2011: Aaranya Kaandam (National Film Award for Best Editing)
- 2011: Mankatha
- 2012: Aravaan
- 2012: Kazhugu
- 2012: Second Show (Malayalam film)
- 2012: Kalakalappu
- 2012: Thadaiyara Thaakka
- 2012: Murattu Kaalai
- 2013: Mathil Mel Poonai
- 2013: Alex Pandian
- 2013: Vathikuchi
- 2013: Endrendrum Punnagai
- 2013: Thillu Mullu
- 2013: Biriyani
- 2013: Theeya Velai Seiyyanum Kumaru
- 2014: Koothara (Malayalam)
- 2014: Meaghamann
- 2014: Aranmanai
- 2014 Thirudan Police
- 2015: Aambala
- 2016: Hello Naan Pei Pesuren
- 2016: Aranmanai 2
- 2018: Kalakalappu 2
- 2019: Vantha Rajavathaan Varuven
- 2019: Thadam
- 2019: Action
- 2021: Anandham Vilayadum Veedu
- 2022: Kadamaiyai Sei
- 2022: Veerame Vaagai Soodum
- 2022: Naan Mirugamaai Maara
- 2022: Kalaga Thalaivan
- 2022: Varalaru Mukkiyam
- 2022: Laththi
- 2023: DD Returns
- 2025: Vidaa Muyarchi
- 2025: Madha Gaja Raja
- 2025: Dinasari
- 2026: Love Oh Love

== Awards ==
- 2008 Ananda Vikatan Cinema Award for Best editor - Saroja
- 2011 National Film Award for Best Editing - Aaranya Kaandam
