= Jansankhya Sthirata Kosh =

Jansankhya Sthirata Kosh (JSK) is a registered society of the Ministry of Health and Family Welfare, Government of India started with a Rs 100 crore grant from government.

The society was established with the objective of highlighting the need for population stabilization. Its accounts can be audited by the CAG.
