= Naan Mirugamaai Maara =

2022 Indian film by Sathyasiva

- Theatrical release poster
- Directed by: Sathyasiva
- Written by: Sathyasiva
- Produced by: T. D. Rajha; D. R. Sanjay Kumar
- Starring: M. Sasikumar; Hariprriya; Vikranth
- Cinematography: Raja Bhattacharjee
- Edited by: N. B. Srikanth
- Music by: Ghibran
- Production company: Chendur Film International
- Distributed by: Murugan Cine Arts
- Release date: 18 November 2022
- Running time: 120 minutes
- Country: India
- Language: Tamil

Naan Mirugamaai Maara (transl. I transform into a beast) is a 2022 Indian Tamil-language action thriller film written and directed by Sathyasiva and produced by T. D. Rajha and D. R. Sanjay Kumar under the banner of Chendur Film International. The film stars M. Sasikumar, Hariprriya and Vikranth in lead roles. It has no songs with a score composed by Ghibran, with cinematography by Raja Bhattacharjee and editing by N. B. Srikanth.

Originally titled Common Man, the title was changed to Naan Mirugamaai Maara after a legal dispute. The film was predominantly shot in Chennai. It was planned to release in theatres in October 2022, but was postponed due to post-production delays. It was released theatrically on 18 November 2022.

== Plot ==
Bhoominathan is a sound engineer who leads a peaceful life with his wife Aanandhi and his family. The trajectory of his life changes when his younger brother, Kathir, a software engineer, inadvertently intervenes to rescue a businessman named Devaraj from a targeted assassination attempt by a violent local gang. In retaliation for his interference, the gang brutally murders Kathir.

Seeking justice for his brother's death, Bhoominathan attempts to trace the culprits. However, his actions draw the attention of the criminal network and its leader, Dass, who operates out of prison. The gang begins targeting Bhoominathan's family, forcing him into a corner. They demand that he complete their original contract by assassinating Devaraj, threatening to kill his wife and child if he refuses. Unable to commit the murder yet desperate to secure his family's safety, Bhoominathan utilizes his specialized acoustic skills and audio engineering knowledge to track down, intercept, and eliminate the gang members one by one.

== Cast ==
- M. Sasikumar as Bhoominathan, a sound engineer
- Hariprriya as Aanandhi, Bhoominathan's wife
- Vikranth as Dass alias Satan
- Shankarnag Vijayan as Kanagu, Dass's brother and Durai's friend
- Madhusudhan Rao as Devaraj, the politician
- Appani Sarath as Durai, Dass's henchmen and Kanagu’s friend
- Supergood Kannan as Venkatachalam, Bhoominathan's uncle
- K. S. G. Venkatesh as Bhoominathan's father
- Thulasi as Bhoominathan's mother
- Azhar as Kathir, Bhoominathan and Pavithra's brother
- Vaishnavi Arulmozhi as Pavithra, Bhoominathan and Kathir's sister
- Boys Rajan as Devaraj's friend
- O. A. K. Sundar as Inspector
- Namo Narayana as Devaraj's opposite party leader
- Karate Raja as Rathinam
- Udayaraj as Henchman

== Production ==
The film was tentatively titled as Sasikumar21. On 25 July 2022, the film's official title was unveiled as Naan Mirugamaai Maara. This is the second collaboration of Sasikumar and producer T. D. Rajha after Raajavamsam (2021).

== Music ==
The film score was composed by Ghibran in his second collaboration with Sasikumar after Kutti Puli (2013) and first with Sathyasiva. The film has no songs. The audio rights were acquired by Think Music India.

== Release ==
=== Theatrical ===
The film was initially scheduled to release in theatres in October 2022, but was postponed to 18 November 2022. The trailer of the film were released on 29 October 2022. The film has received an A certificate due to its violent content.

=== Distribution ===
The distribution rights of the film in Tamil Nadu were acquired by Sangili Murugan under the banner of Murugan Cine Arts. The distribution rights of the film in Karnataka were acquired by ATM Productions.

=== Home media ===
The post-theatrical streaming rights were sold to Sun NXT. The film premiered through Sun TV on 5 February 2023.

== Reception ==
Logesh Balachandran of The Times of India gave 2 stars out of 5 stars and stated that, "Naan Mirugamai Maara would have been better if the director had made this film a decade ago". Avinash Ramachandran of Cinema Express who gave 2.5 stars out of stars after reviewing the film stated that,"It is quite a shame because Naan Mirugamaai Maara could have been cut out of the same cloth as a John Wick or a Nobody, but the overt sentimentality and emotional prodding make it a rather middling experience".
