= Kazhugu 2 =

2019 Indian film by Sathyasiva

- Theatrical release poster
- Directed by: Sathyasiva
- Screenplay by: Sathyasiva
- Story by: Sathyasiva
- Produced by: Manobala
- Starring: Krishna; Bindu Madhavi
- Cinematography: Raja Bhattacharjee
- Edited by: Gopi Krishna
- Music by: Yuvan Shankar Raja
- Release date: 1 August 2019
- Country: India
- Language: Tamil

Kazhugu 2 (transl. Eagle 2) is a 2019 Indian Tamil-language comedy thriller film written and directed by Sathyasiva, starring Krishna and Bindu Madhavi. It is the sequel to the 2012 film, Kazhugu. It was produced by Singaravelan under the banner Madhukkoor films. The music was composed by Yuvan Shankar Raja. The film was released on 1 August 2019 to below average reviews.

== Plot ==
The story revolves around two petty thieves Johnny and his accomplice Kaali, as they are mistaken for huntsmen who can protect the laborers who are working in a deadly forest that is habituated by Dhole. The crooks use this opportunity as a hideout and what happens next forms the rest of the film.

== Cast ==
- Krishna as Johnny
- Bindu Madhavi as Merly
- Kaali Venkat as Kaali
- M. S. Bhaskar as Maari
- Hareesh Peradi as MLA
- Rama as Merly's mother
- Venkat Subha as Doss
- Nellai Siva as Head Constable
- Rajendranath as Police Inspector
- Amirthalingam as Police Constable
- Shankarnag Vijayan as Shankar
- Crane Manohar
- Yashika Aannand in a special appearance

== Production ==
In 2018, Thirupur P. A. Ganesan announced that he would produce a film directed by Sathyasiva starring Krishna in the lead role. Kazhugu 2 shooting begins 3 July.

== Soundtrack ==
Kazhugu 2

Soundtrack album by Yuvan Shankar Raja
- Released: 2019
- Genre: Feature film soundtrack
- Language: Tamil

Yuvan Shankar Raja chronology
Sindhubaadh (2019)	Kazhugu 2 (2019)	Nerkonda Paarvai (2019)

Singles from Kazhugu 2
- 1. "Sakalakala Valli" Released: 12 January 2019

This film's all songs are composed by Yuvan Shankar Raja, who had previously composed for Sathyasiva's previous venture Kazhugu. Yashika Aannand landed a role of a dancer for a song titled Sakalakala Valli which also featured 300 dancers apart from her. The first single of Kazhugu 2 featuring Yashika in folk song was released on 12 January 2019.

No.	Title	Singer(s)	Length
1.	"Sakalakala Valli"	Guru Ayyadurai, Suvi Suresh
2.	"Yelamala Kathu"	M. M. Manasi
