= Mankatha (soundtrack) =

- Original CD cover

Soundtrack album by Yuvan Shankar Raja
- Released: 10 August 2011
- Recorded: 2010–2011
- Genre: Feature film soundtrack
- Length: 38:51
- Language: Tamil
- Label: Sony Music India
- Producer: Yuvan Shankar Raja

Yuvan Shankar Raja chronology
Avan Ivan (2011)	Mankatha (2011)	Panjaa (2011)

Singles from Mankatha
- 1. "Vilaiyaadu Mankatha" Released: 20 May 2011

Mankatha is the soundtrack album, composed by Yuvan Shankar Raja, to the 2011 film of the same name, directed by Venkat Prabhu starring Ajith Kumar. The album features eight tracks, with lyrics penned by Vaali, Gangai Amaran, and Niranjan Bharathi. Following a number of postponements, it was finally released on 10 August 2011 by Sony Music India.

The soundtrack was described as a "mélange of techno, melody, a couple of duets and a mass song". The album features eight tracks, including one Theme music track and one club mix. The first track of the album, "Vilaiyaadu Mankatha" was launched as a single release in mid-May 2011, three months prior to the soundtrack release.

== Production ==
For the film's soundtrack and score, Venkat Prabhu renewed his association with his cousin Yuvan Shankar Raja in their fourth consecutive collaboration since Venkat's debut Chennai 600028 (2007). In October 2010, Yuvan began composing the first song—the introductory number "Vilaiyaadu Mankatha"—for the film even before production began. Yuvan said that he took extra care on composing that number, as he had to highlight the significance of the game while also serving as a "great introduction song for Ajith" in his landmark 50th film. The dance number "Machi Open the Bottle" has a folk touch, which Yuvan admitted that he had a desire to compose a folk number. Yuvan incorporated elements of "Raman Aandalum" composed by Ilaiyaraaja for Mullum Malarum (1978).

The track "Vaada Bin Laada", a duet picturised on Ajith and Trisha was shot in a studio as it utilized computer graphics. The song utilized a fusion of Carnatic and electronic techno music and was sung by Krish and Suchitra, the former of whom sung in a baritone voice. The tune of the song was based on the Carnatic raaga Madhuvanti. In March 2011, Venkat announced on Twitter, disclosing that the soundtrack album would consist of nine tracks, including one promotional track, one theme music track and one club mix, further adding that six songs had been composed and three out of them recorded already. The remaining songs were recorded from mid-June only, with Yuvan Shankar Raja informing the following month, that he had scrapped one of the songs, since he was not satisfied with its tune, and composed a new song, starting from scratch.

Reports in July 2011 revealed that the album would feature two more duets; "Nee Naan", which was sung by S. P. B. Charan and Yuvan Shankar Raja's sister, Bhavatharini, while Madhushree and Yuvan Shankar himself had sung the other one titled "Nanbane". Initially, the song was not planned as Yuvan neither had planned to sing any songs nor composing a pathos number, but the song had been composed owing to Venkat's perusal. The song "Nee Naan" was revealed to be the replacement for the scrapped song, which Yuvan Shankar Raja had composed within ten minutes of time, with the composer going to pick that song as his favorite from the album. The scrapped song was later revealed to be "Pesadhe" which Yuvan used in Thirudan Police (2014). Karthik and Vijay Yesudas had performed another song in the album, titled "Balle Lakka", which also features vocals of Anusha Dhayanidhi, wife of producer Dayanidhi Azhagiri, debuting as a playback singer. She was persuaded into playback singing by Venkat Prabhu who had seen her performing on her wedding reception and was impressed by her voice. The planned promotional track was excluded from the album in last minute. Initially, it was reported that Ilaiyaraaja would sing a song for the film which was proven to be false.

Besides, Vaali and Gangai Amaran, who usually write lyrics for Venkat Prabhu's films, renowned poet Subramanya Bharathi's great great grandson, Niranjan Bharathi had penned one song ("Nee Naan"), becoming his first work in a feature film. The music rights were sold to Sony Music Entertainment who had reportedly offered ₹1 crore (equivalent to ₹2.2 crore or US$230,000 in 2026). Yuvan began working on the re-recording in August 2011, assisted by Premgi Amaren who had also orchestrated two songs.

== Release ==
The release of the soundtrack album was initially scheduled for 1 May 2011, coinciding with Ajith Kumar's birthday, but had to be postponed to mid-May which too was curtailed. A single track "Vilayaadu Mankatha" was released on 20 May 2011 to promote the film and became viral upon release. Yuvan decided to launch the song as a single owing to the success of "Evan Di Unna Pethan" from Vaanam.

Due to the delay in the recording of songs, the music launch was pushed to June and later to July. Venkat Prabhu announced the new date as 18 July, which however was not approved by producer Dhayanidhi. The executives of Sony Music also denied the plans for a July release as the audio for the high-profile films Velayudham and 7 Aum Arivu also planned to be released on the same weekend and felt that three audio launches in the same weekend might impact the sales of the albums. The master CD was eventually handed over to Sony Music on 22 July 2011, which fixed the release date for 10 August 2011.

Since Ajith Kumar informed that he wouldn't attend any promotional events of his films, producer Dhayanidhi Azhagiri dropped the idea of a grand release function. The album was eventually released in a soft launch at the Chennai station of Radio Mirchi during the breakfast show Hello Chennai, with Venkat, Yuvan, Vaibhav, Mahat and Ashwin being present. All the tracks from the album were premiered on the channel and played repeatedly, with the event being simultaneously aired across Radio Mirchi's stations in Coimbatore and Madurai. The album was also released via online music platforms and retail stores for digital download. Two days later, a press meet was arranged at a preview theatre in Saligramam, Chennai and a special screening of two songs and the trailer was held.

== Reception ==
=== Critical reception ===
Pavithra Srinivasan of Rediff.com wrote "It's clear that Yuvan has tried to satisfy all sections of his listening audience: the diehard Ajith fans and those who wish for something new from Yuvan himself. They're pleasant listens, but hardly ground-breaking. Music connoisseurs might complain, but hardcore Ajith and Yuvan fans aren't likely to." Vipin Nair of Music Aloud wrote "For the fourth time out of four, YSR-Venkat Prabhu combo works, barring a few hiccups. After all, this is family matter." Karthik Srinivasan of Milliblog wrote "Makatha is a curiously interesting mixed bag from Yuvan." Sudha Rao of Lokvani.com wrote "Mankatha’s music has energy, variety and showcases some young and fresh talent and despite a few shortcomings…is certainly not boring".

Malathi Rangarajan of The Hindu wrote "Yuvan's music, including the title track, theme music and the ‘Nee Naan' number, are awesome, but when songs impede the pace of the narration they become too much of a good thing. How come Vaali's verses get more youthful as he ages? Just listen to the words of ‘Machi Open the Bottle …' or ‘Vaada Bin Laada' and you'll know what I mean!" N. Venkateswaran of The Times of India wrote "Vilayada Mankatha" is topping the charts, but Yuvan Shankar Raja disappoints with the rest of the songs." Sify wrote "The music of Yuvan Shankar Raja is strictly average with just one song Nanbane.. being the only hummable number." Akhila Krishnamurthy of Outlook considered the music to be "tiresome".

=== Commercial reception ===
The album received overwhelming response, as did the release function itself, with reportedly over 7 lakh listeners having tuned into Radio Mirchi during the premiere. While the single track, "Vilaiyaadu Mankatha", had been declared a "smash hit" even before, the full album had achieved record breaking sales, with the associate director of Sony Music India South, Ashok Parwani, noting in a press release that Sony Music had registered a pre-booking of 60%.

== Track listing ==
Track list
No.	Title	Lyrics	Music	Singer(s)	Length
1.	"Vilayaadu Mankatha"	Vaalee, Rita (Hindi), Yuvan Shankar Raja (English)	Yuvan Shankar Raja	Yuvan Shankar Raja, Ranjith, Anitha Karthikeyan, Premgi Amaren, Rita	6:02
2.	"Nee Naan"	Niranjan Bharathi	Yuvan Shankar Raja	S. P. B. Charan, Bhavatharini	4:07
3.	"Vaada Bin Lada"	Vaalee , Gangai Amaran	Yuvan Shankar Raja	Krish, Suchitra	4:29
4.	"Machi Open The Bottle"	Vaalee	Yuvan Shankar Raja	Mano, Premgi Amaren, Haricharan, Tippu, Karthik, Naveen Madhav, Suchith Suresan, D. Sathyaprakash, Rahul Nambiar, M.K. Balaji	4:46
5.	"Nanbane"	Vaalee	Yuvan Shankar Raja	Madhushree, Yuvan Shankar Raja	5:02
6.	"Balle Lakka"	Gangai Amaran	Yuvan Shankar Raja	Karthik, Vijay Yesudas, Anusha Durai Dhayanidhi	5:15
7.	"Mankatha Theme Music"	—	Yuvan Shankar Raja	Instrumental	3:04
8.	"Vilayaadu Mankatha (Extended Dance Mix)"	Gangai Amaran, Rita (Hindi), Yuvan Shankar Raja (English)	Remixed by Premgi Amaren	Yuvan Shankar Raja, Ranjith, Rita, Anitha Karthikeyan, Premgi Amaren	6:05
Total length:					38:51

== Legacy ==
In The Hindu's column for Ten Tamil films from the last decade with the best ‘mass’ music, Pradeep Kumar listed Mankatha, adding "The score fulfilled its prime job of eliciting applause and whistles from the gallery. Be it the intro scene, or the sequence where Ajith performed a wheelie with actor Vaibhav riding pillion on a super bike, or when the final reveal happens, Yuvan’s ‘Mankatha’ theme score was on the mark." Yuvan considered the theme music as one of his favorites from the album. Yuvan's music was considered instrumental for the film performing beyond expectations. Despite praise, the theme music was alleged to be plagiarised from 50 Cent though Venkat Prabhu denied such claims and stated that Yuvan had given due credits for the theme song.

== Accolades ==
Award (Note: Awards, festivals and organizations are in alphabetical order.)	Date of ceremony (Note: Date is linked to the article about the awards held that year, wherever possible.)	Category	Recipient(s) and nominee(s)	Result	Ref.
International Tamil Film Awards	3 March 2012	Best Female Playback Singer	Suchitra for "Vaada Bin Laada"	Won	
Mirchi Music Awards South	4 August 2012	Best Upcoming Lyricist	Niranjan Bharathi for "Nee Naan"	Won	
Mirchi Music Awards South	4 August 2012	Technical Sound Engineer	M. Kumaraguparan	Won	
South Indian International Movie Awards	21–22 June 2012	Best Male Playback Singer – Tamil	S. P. B. Charan for "Nee Naan"	Nominated	
Vijay Awards	16 June 2012	Favourite Song	Yuvan Shankar Raja for "Vilaiyaadu Mankatha"	Nominated	

== Personnel ==
=== Instruments ===
- Live drums & percussion: V. Kumar
- Additional keyboard program: Premgi Amaren
- Strings conducted by: Prabhakar
- String instruments: Babu
- Bass Guitar: Keith Peters
- Guitar: Keba
- Trumpet: Maxi & Babu
- Mandolin Veena: Devi
- Mridangam: Srinivas
- Tapes & Tavil: Sunder & Jeycha
- Additional percussion: L. V. Prasad, Sundar, V. Ramana, Jaicha

=== Production ===
- Program Manager: V. Karthik
- Program Co-ordination: A. S. Subbiah
- Recorded at: Prasad Studios & S.a.s.i Studios, Chennai
- Recorded by: M. Kumaraguruparan, Baranidharan, Prabhakar & Sekar
- Mixed at: Pinkstone Studios
- Mixed & Mastered by: M. Kumaraguruparan
