= JSK: Janaki V v/s State of Kerala =

2025 Indian film

- Theatrical release poster
- Directed by: Pravin Narayanan
- Written by: Pravin Narayanan
- Produced by: J. Phanindra Kumar
- Starring: Suresh Gopi; Anupama Parameswaran; Shruthi Ramachandran; Madhav Suresh
- Cinematography: Renadive
- Edited by: Samjith Mohammed
- Music by: Score: Ghibran; Songs: Gireesh Narayanan Ghibran
- Production company: Cosmos Entertainments
- Distributed by: Dream Big Films
- Release date: 17 July 2025
- Running time: 154 minutes
- Country: India
- Language: Malayalam

JSK: Janaki V v/s State of Kerala is a 2025 Indian Malayalam-language courtroom legal thriller film written and directed by Pravin Narayanan. It stars Suresh Gopi and Anupama Parameswaran. It is produced by J. Phanindra Kumar under the banner of Cosmos Entertainments, with Sethuraman Nair Kankol as co-producer.

The film was released on 17 July 2025. This movie received mixed reviews from critics.

== Plot ==
Janaki Vidhyadharan is an IT professional from Bengaluru whose visit to her hometown for a festival turns into a nightmare when she becomes a victim of sexual assault. As she seeks justice, she loses her father and the case takes a complex turn when David Abel Donovan, a sharp and composed lawyer, steps in to defend the accused. Caught in the crossfire between legal arguments and lived trauma, Janaki's fight exposes the deep moral and ethical dilemmas of the Indian judicial system. In a world where the law is supposed to protect, the lines between right and wrong begin to blur leaving us to ask: what really happened to Janaki, and what does justice truly mean?

== Cast ==
- Suresh Gopi in a dual role as
  - Adv. David Abel Donovan, Daniel's son and Niveditha's brother
  - Daniel Abel Donovan, David and Niveditha's father (Animation cameo appearance)
- Anupama Parameswaran as Janaki Vidhyadharan
- Shruthi Ramachandran as Adv. Niveditha Abel Donovan, David's sister and Daniel's daughter
- Madhav Suresh as Naveen Mathews, Saira's brother
- Askar Ali as Thampanoor Police Station CPO Firoz Mohammad
- Divya Pillai as Saira Fathima, Naveen's sister
- Baiju Santhosh as Thampanoor Police Station SI Kanakaraj
- Abhishek Ravindran as Adv. Vishnu Kurup, David's junior
- Vaishnavi Raj as Lakshmi, Janaki's friend
- Medha Pallavi as Rakshita Shetty, Janaki's friend
- Yadu Krishnan as Kunnamkulam Police Station CI Mathayoos Baby
- Shobi Thilakan as Thampanoor Police Station CI Gopakumar
- Dilip Menon as Vidhyadharan Pillai, Janaki's father
- Jayan Cherthala as Public Prosecutor Adv. Gopalakrishnan
- Kottayam Ramesh as Public Prosecutor Adv. Nandakumar
- Joy Mathew as Bishop Mar Thomas Chittalanchery
- Jose Shonadhri as Samuel John
- Rajith Menon as Venkat, Janaki's office friend
- Joemon Joshy as Adv. Bineesh, Firoz's friend
- Dini Daniel as Dr. Elizabeth Mamen
- Balaji Sharma as Shivaprasad Eloor, Opposition Party Leader
- Nishthar Sait as MLA Antony Issac
- Shafeer Khan as Venu Chittappan (Venugopal)
- Manjusree Nair as Chitta
- Ratheesh Krishnan as Tony Thomas, Bakery Staff
- Jai Vishnu as Anand Muralidhran, Bakery Staff
- Musthafa Sargam as Manohar
- Aswin Gopi Nath as Bakery Staff (Chottu)
- Akhil Jibin Abraham as Groom

== Production ==
The film commenced it's shooting in November 2022. The film is produced by J. Phanindra Kumar under Cosmos Entertainments, with Sethuraman Nair Kankol as co-producer. The cinematography is handled by Renadive, editing by Samjith Mohammed, and music composed by Gireesh Narayanan. The film's background score were composed by Ghibran. The film wrapped the shooting on 9 November 2023.

== Music ==
Janaki V v/s State of Kerala

Soundtrack album by Ghibran and Gireesh Narayanan
- Released: 16 June 2025
- Recorded: 2024-2025
- Studios: Akshrah Soundlab; SR Productions, Tiruvanathapuram; SKR Studios, Cochin; EkaDhanThA Studios, Thrissur; Sonic Island, Cochin
- Genre: Feature film soundtrack
- Length: 25:33
- Language: Malayalam
- Label: Zee Music Company
- Producers: Ghibran; Gireesh Narayanan
External audio
- Janaki V v/s State of Kerala - Full Album on YouTube

The film's music composed by Gireesh Narayanan and Ghibran.Ghibran also composed background score of this film.

Track listing
No.	Title	Lyrics	Music	singer	Length
1.	"Rise From Fire"	Haritha Haribabu	Ghibran	Sarath Santosh	2:45
2.	"Rise From Fire-Janaki Version"	Haritha Haribabu	Ghibran	Sarath Santosh	2:48
3.	"Cheraman Aadharal"	Santhosh Varma	Gireesh Narayanan	Sannidhanandan, Kaanjana Sriram, Aswathy Nair, Gireesh Narayananan	3:55
4.	"Sayakam"	Jyothish Kassi	Gireesh Narayanan	Vaikom Vijayalakshmi, Reshma Raghavendra, Gireesh Narayanan	3:44
5.	"Kanmathi Kankalil"	Jyothish Kassi	Gireesh Narayanan	Amrita Jayakumar, Mridula Warrier, Gireesh Narayanan	4:08
6.	"Mizhiyile Sooryanum"	Jyothish Kassi	Gireesh Narayanan	Gireesh Narayanan	4:37
7.	"Neelum Thirikal"	Jyothish Kassi	Gireesh Narayanan	Gireesh Narayanan, Reshma Raghavendra, Amrita Jayakumar	3:36
Total length:					25:33

== Release ==
The first look poster was released on 6 June 2024. The release date was announced on 26 January 2025. A motion poster for the film was released on 28 May 2025, confirming the theatrical release date as 20 June 2025. However it was initially postponed by one week and confirmed the release date as 27 June 2025. But it was delayed by the intervention of Central Board of Film Certification (CBFC), citing an objection to the use of the name Janaki for the main character and in the film's title. The CBFC demanded that the name be changed, leading to a delay in the certification process and subsequently postponing the film's release again. After the production's legal battle against CBFC, the film is finally released on 17 July 2025.

=== Home media ===
Zee5 acquired the digital rights to the film and was released on 15 August 2025.

== Reception ==
Janaki V vs State of Kerala received mixed reviews.

- India Today praised the film's socially relevant premise and strong performances especially by Anupama Parameshwaran but criticised its inconsistent screenplay and uneven pacing. They noted that "noble intentions" were "marred in execution" due to subplots that distracted from the central narrative.
- The News Minute called the film an attempt to revive Suresh Gopi's superstar era, noting that its core message is lost in preachy heroism.
- The Indian Express rated it 2.5/5, praises for its rare survivor centric narrative but criticizes it for being overshadowed by unnecessary "superstar syndrome" hijacking the spotlight.
- The New Indian Express criticised the film as a misfired courtroom drama that sidelines its female lead and centers male voices instead.
- The Times of India rated the film 2.5/5, stating that its strong premise is let down by a muddled screenplay and overlong monologues.
- Onmanorama praised hard-hitting courtroom scenes and strong performances, but suffers from uneven execution and jarring screenplay.
- The Week described the film as a polished legal thriller featuring a refined performances, but criticized the film for its confused and inconsistent narrative structure.
- The Hindu gave a negative review criticised the film as "insensitive and pointless," stating it became an overly star-driven drama instead of a sensitive courtroom story.
- In contrast, Mathrubhumi News gave a more positive review, calling it a "hard-hitting legal drama elevated by Suresh Gopi’s intense presence" and praising its emotional and political undertones.

== Legal Issues ==
=== Legal dispute and interim stay ===
In May 2025, the film became the subject of a legal dispute when the Madras High Court issued an interim injunction restraining its release. The stay order was granted after a petition was filed by a Chennai-based production house, alleging non-payment of dues amounting to ₹1.3 crore by the producers of the film. The petitioner claimed that despite providing financial support during the film's production, the repayment was defaulted.

The case drew attention due to the film's anticipated release and the involvement of popular actor Suresh Gopi in the lead role. As of late May 2025, the court's final decision on whether the release would proceed was pending.

=== Censorship controversy and CBFC objection ===
Before its release, the film was involved in a certification dispute with the Central Board of Film Certification (CBFC). According to reports, the CBFC initially declined to certify the film, citing concerns over the use of the name Janaki for the lead character, which they reportedly considered sensitive due to its association with the Hindu goddess Sita. The filmmakers, however, stated that no formal written explanation was provided and that they were verbally asked to change both the character's name and the film's title.

The reported objection drew responses from various film industry organizations and political groups. B. Unnikrishnan, General Secretary of the Film Employees Federation of Kerala (FEFKA), criticized the demand, describing it as unusual and expressing concern about its implications for creative expression. The Democratic Youth Federation of India (DYFI) also issued a statement opposing the reported stance of the CBFC and called for respect for artistic freedom. Several media commentators and legal professionals also questioned the absence of a documented rationale from the CBFC and raised broader concerns about freedom of expression in cinema.

Due to the dispute, the film's release, originally scheduled for 27 June 2025, was postponed. The filmmakers publicly stated that they did not intend to comply with the requested changes and were considering legal action against the CBFC's decision.

The Kerala High Court intervened in the matter and sought clarification from the CBFC. During the proceedings, the Court questioned whether the Board had the authority to object to character names and storylines. The Court referenced previous films such as Seeta Aur Geeta and Ram Lakhan to highlight what it viewed as inconsistent application of guidelines. Justice N. Nagaresh directed the CBFC to submit a written affidavit explaining how the use of the name "Janaki" conflicted with certification rules. The affidavit was to be submitted by 2 July 2025, the date of the next scheduled hearing.

On 30 June 2025, various Malayalam film industry organizations, including FEFKA, AMMA, and the Kerala Film Producers Association, held a protest at CBFC's regional office in Thiruvananthapuram. Participants symbolically discarded scissors into a bin and carried placards advocating for creative freedom and protesting against censorship.

FEFKA's General Secretary B. Unnikrishnan reiterated concerns regarding alleged interference in naming decisions. Director Kamal likened the situation to earlier instances of censorship in India's political history and emphasized the need to safeguard artistic liberties. Kerala's Minister for Cultural Affairs, Saji Cherian, also commented on the issue, calling CBFC's reported objection "unacceptable" and raising concerns about its potential impact on smaller filmmakers.

On 2 July 2025, the Kerala High Court directed that the film be screened for judicial review on 5 July 2025. The next hearing was scheduled for 9 July 2025.

During the 9 July 2025 hearing, a settlement was reached between the film's producers and the CBFC. Initially, the CBFC had proposed 96 edits and changes to the film's title and character name. Following discussions facilitated by the Court, the CBFC agreed to reduce the required changes to two: muting the name "Janaki" in two courtroom scenes and modifying the film's title to reflect the protagonist's full name.

The original title Janaki v/s State of Kerala was revised to Janaki V v/s State of Kerala and it was adopted to represent the character's full name, Janaki Vidhyadharan. While the filmmakers initially expressed concern over the impact of these changes, they agreed to the modifications. The High Court directed the producers, Cosmos Entertainments, to submit the updated version of the film and instructed the CBFC to issue the certification within three days.
