= Residency Towers Chennai =

Hotel in Chennai, India

- Interactive map of the Residency Towers Chennai area
- Hotel chain: The Residency Group

General information
- Location: India, T. Nagar; Chennai, Tamil Nadu 600 017
- Coordinates: 13.040529°N 80.243738°E
- Opening: 7 April 2003
- Operator: Appaswamy Group

Technical details
- Floor count: 16

Design and construction
- Developer: Sood & Sood builders, SAS Hotels Enterprises

Other information
- Number of rooms: 176
- Parking: 180-200 cars

Website
- theresidency.com

Residency Towers Chennai is a five-star luxury hotel located at T. Nagar, Chennai, India. Built at a cost of ₹ 50 crore, the hotel is the second Residency hotel in the city and fourth in the chain.

== History ==
Upon acquiring a land measuring 26 grounds from the Russian consulate, Sood & Sood joined with Appaswamy Group on joint development of commercial complexes. However, they subsequently chose to build a four-star hotel instead.

== The hotel ==
Built on a land measuring 26 grounds, the hotel has 16 floors with 176 rooms, 11 theme-based suites, theme restaurants, convention halls and car parking facilities (two basement floors) for around 180 to 200 cars. Thirty percent of the land has been taken up for the building, while the rest will be used for the car park and landscaping. Other features of the hotel include a 24-hour restaurant with an interactive kitchen and an ambiance of a recreated European street, an old-world themed bar, with beer barrels, old prints and a 1945 Norton motorcycle suspended from the ceiling and a southern specialty restaurant recreated in Chettinad style with original wooden pillars and paintings from this region.

There are two executive club floors with a lounge, one suite floor, six banquet halls with a capacity of 100 to 1000. The hotel also has a business centre, swimming pool, health club and a spa. In addition, the hotel also has an exclusive ladies lounge and ladies floor.

In June 2003, the hotel launched its banana leaf service at its southern speciality restaurant, Southern Aromas.

== See also ==
- Hotels in Chennai
- List of tallest buildings in Chennai
