= Sathyan (singer) =

Indian playback singer

- Also known as: M. Satyan, Needhi Mohan
- Occupations: Playback singer, composer
- Years active: 2004–present

Sathyan Mahalingam, popularly known as Sathyan, is an Indian playback singer and composer. He is best known for performing the hit numbers "Kalakkapovathu Yaaru" (Vasool Raja MBBS), "Sil Sil" (Arinthum Ariyamalum) and the title track from Boss Engira Bhaskaran and Thee Mugam Dhaan (Nerkonda Paarvai)

== Biography ==
=== Career ===
Satyan had been singing in numerous light music orchestras since 1996. He had also performed for many of the leading orchestras in Tamil Nadu. In fact, he had performed in more than 2500 stage shows during his singing career as a light music singer.

In 2004, Satyan entered the Tamil Film Industry, was introduced by Music Director Baradwaj. He started his career as a play back singer in the film Vasool Raja MBBS by singing the popular song Kalakka Povadhu Yaaru with Padmasree Kamalhaasan. Subsequently, Satyan had sung over 150 songs in Tamil, Telugu and Kannada films. He had performed several star musical shows in India and all over the world in countries like Canada, United States, Australia, Japan, Hongkong, Malaysia, Singapore, Dubai, Sri Lanka, London, Paris and Russia. Besides being a playback singer, Satyan had also been working as music composer since 2008. He had composed and programmed over 100 jingles and music albums for Shakthi FM, Sri Lanka and for various ad agencies in India. Notably, he composed a devotional song for the Nallur Murugan Temple (Sri Lanka), which was sung by legendary singers, lateT. M. Soundararajan and P. Susheela. He has also composed devotional songs sung by great singers like Late S.P Balasubramaniam, Vani Jeyaram, T.L Maharajan, L.R Eswari and Mano.

Satyan gave his debut as Music Composer in Tamil Film Industry in the movie Vizhithiru. He is currently working as composer in 3 movies in Telugu, Kannada and Malayalam.

He also has a his own Music Live Band called ASTHRAAS, which has performed all over the world.

A song he sang at a 1999 event, Roja Roja, went viral on social media.

== Discography ==
=== Playback performances ===
The following is an incomplete list of popular songs sung by Satyan Mahalingam.

Year	Song	Film	Music director(s)
2004	"Kalakka Povadhu Yaaru"	Vasool Raja MBBS	Bharadwaj
2005	"Sil Sil Sil Mazhaiye"	Arindhum Ariyaamalum	Yuvan Shankar Raja
2006	"Star Hotel"	Vattaram	Bharadwaj
2007	"Sollamale"	Naalaiya Pozhuthum Unnodu	Srikanth Deva
2007	"Gulla Gulla Dracula"	Muni	Bharadwaj
2008	"Yahoo Yahoo"	Aegan	Yuvan Shankar Raja
2008	"Dosthu Bada Dosthu"	Saroja	Yuvan Shankar Raja
2008	"Kanavile"	Nepali	Srikanth Deva
2010	"Ada Boss Boss"	Boss Engira Bhaskaran	Yuvan Shankar Raja
2010	"Kuppathu Rajakkal"	Baana Kaathadi	Yuvan Shankar Raja
2011	"Avanapathi"	Avan Ivan	Yuvan Shankar Raja
2011	"Paparayudu"	Panjaa	Yuvan Shankar Raja
2012	"Aambalaikkum Pombalaikkum"	Kazhugu	Yuvan Shankar Raja
2012	"Theeye Theeye"	Maattrraan	Harris Jayaraj
2012	"Adikkadi Mudi"	Ponmaalai Pozhudhu	C. Sathya
2012	"Podi Vechi Pudippan"	Attakathi	Santhosh Narayanan
2012	"Dhoorathil Unnaipaartha"	Veyilodu Vilayadu	Karthik Raja
2012	"Kutti puli"	Thuppakki	Harris Jayaraj
2012	"Kannaale Kaditham"	Theni Maavattam	Wesly
2013	"Ulladha naan solla"	Kedi Billa Killadi Ranga	Yuvan Shankar Raja
2013	"Rathathin Nuraiya"	Mathil Mel Poonai	Ganesh Raghavendra
2013	"Aagaayam Boomikkellam"	6	Srikanth Deva
2013	"Boy Friend"	6	Srikanth Deva
2013	"Eppadi Ennul"	Nugam	D. J. Gopinath
2013	"Oo La La"	Naadi Thudikkudhadi	Ilayaraaja
2014	"Uyrin Maeloru Uyirvanthu"	Vadacurry	Yuvan Shankar Raja
2019	"The Theme - Thee Mugam Dhaan"	Nerkonda Paarvai	Yuvan Shankar Raja
N/A	"Laka Laka Rajini Sir"	Aachariyangal Unlimited	Ganesh Raghavendra
NA	"Minu Minukkum"	Thulli Ezhunthathu Kadhal	Bobo Sashi
NA	"Unnai Vittu"	Padam Paarthu Kathai Sol	Ganesh Raghavendra
NA	"Dhodaa Machi"	Koattai	D. Vijay
2025	“Thennaadu”	Bison Kaalamaadan	Nivas K. Prasanna

Others

- Nenje Nenje – Sevarkodi
- Kodi Kottikoduthaalum – Ponnar Shankar
- Ulle Oru Mirugam – Karungali
- Maasi Maasam – Paandi
- Maarudhu – Indiralogathil Naa Azhagappa
- Oviyam varaigaiyile – Kodambakkam
- Yaar Yaaro – Aachaarya
- Mudhal Mudhalaai – Amma Appa Chellam
- Yaaro Yaaro – Ullakkadathal
- Pattaam Pattaampoochi – Ullakadathal
- Kaadhal Muniva – Thagappanchaami
- Vellakkaara Baby – Nayagan
- Idhudhaanaa Kaaadhal – Pirappu
- Adha thottu – Kaadhal Valarthean
- Usharpannu – Agra
- Sollamale – Naalaiya Pozhudhu Unnodu
- Malarudhu – Manjal Veyil
- Aathamin Apple – Thodakkam
- Adhi Kaalai Vaanam – En Kaadhale
- September – Theeyavan
- Super Star – Kalaiyaadha Ninaivugal
- Wrongu Chithapo – Rasigar Mandram
- Purappadu Nanba – Vetri Thirumagan
- Puyalukkum Neruppukkum – Vetri Thirumagan
- Maathi yosi – Maathi yosi
- Ekkuthappa – Patta Patti 50-50
- Kirukku Paiyya – Melaga

=== Compositions ===
Produced by SHAKTHI FM (Sri Lanka):

- A devotional song for the Nallur Murugan Temple (Sri Lanka), sung by T. M. Soundararajan and P. Susheela
- An Islamic devotional song, performed by Mano
- A song for the Thiruketheeswaram Temple in Mannar (Sri Lanka), sung by S. P. Balasubrahmanyam
- A Murugan song for Kathirgamam Murugan Temple, sung by T. L. Maharajan & Seergazhi Siva Chidambaram
- A Devine song for Mayuraapathi BADRAKALI, sung by Vani Jairam
- A devotional song for the Nayina Theevu Naagabooshini Amman Temple, sung by L.R.Eashwari

Others

- Music for a 30-minute short film En Uyir Thozan, directed by Surya (son of the famous writer Balakumaran)
- A one-hour television film Fair & Lovely, directed by Surya
- A re-recording for a television film, directed by Sharavana Subbiah
- Music for feature film Vizhithiru (2017).
- music for serial in Sun TV

Kanmani (2019)

- music album for flood with actor vishal and producer council thenappan (2017)

chennaiye meendum vaa

- music for future Kannada film

LOVE 2020
