= Evan Di Unna Pethan =

Single by Yuvan Shankar Raja

from the album Vaanam
- Language: Tamil
- Released: December 1, 2010
- Recorded: 2010
- Genre: Club music, filmi
- Length: 5:54
- Label: Venus Music
- Songwriters: Yuvan Shankar Raja, Silambarasan
- Producer: Yuvan Shankar Raja

"Evan Di Unna Pethan" (transl. Who gave birth to you?) is a song by Indian artist and film composer Yuvan Shankar Raja. A part of the soundtrack album to the 2011 film Vaanam, it was released as a single track on 1 December 2010.

The song predominantly features vocals and lyrics by Vaanam's lead artist, Silambarasan, while Yuvan Shankar Raja has also penned parts of the English phrases, performing them himself. This song is notable as being the first single track to be released promotionally for a South Indian film. The track, upon release, became highly popular, with the attempt being declared a great success, while drawing notable attention particularly for its lyrics. Following the positive response, the song was remade in Telugu as "Pista Pista" (Telugu: పిస్తా పిస్తా; English: Person with attitude) for the 2012 film Mr. Nookayya, featuring the voices of Karthik and Yuvan.

== Background ==
Yuvan Shankar Raja and Silambarasan had worked together several times before in Manmadhan, Vallavan and Silambattam, which all scored very successful results. In order to repeat the success, they agreed to produce a single track to promote and popularise the film. Silambarasan said, "The minute Yuvan and I sat down to compose for Vaanam, we wanted to ensure that we came up with a track that would stand out and become popular." The song was developed in several sessions of jamming, and both kept working on it repeatedly even after the song was ready. Silambarasan explained, "I didn't want it to be like a regular love song and was determined to make it unique. So, we've come up with an international level club mix, which I think is a next-generation track." Yuvan Shankar Raja commented, "For the single Simbu wanted something different and it is cool and should work."

== Production ==
"Evan Di Unna Pethan" song has been performed by Silambarasan Rajendar and Yuvan Shankar Raja. Silambarasan has penned the Tamil lyrics while Yuvan Shankar Raja has penned the English phrases, both performing each their lines. This song was recorded at Prasad Studios, by Prabhakar, Sekar and Guru. It was mixed at Pinkstone Studios, Chennai by Kumaraguruparan and was mastered at Metropolis Studios, London by Ian Cooper. The Making Of Evan Di Unna Pethan The Program On SUN TV Is Naan Yaar.

== Music video ==
The music video to the song was featured as part of the film. It was the replacement to the song "Prapancham Naaventa Vasthunte" in the original film Vedam. The song was shot simultaneously with the Hindi version for three days in March 2011 in Mumbai. "A pub set" was put up in a studio in Mumbai to go with the theme of the song, with 60 dancers from Mumbai in addition to 30 dancers flown in from London, being background dancers, dancing alongside Silambarasan and his pair in the film Jasmin Bhasin. According to Silambarasan, "the focus of the song was more on style — the lighting and showcasing the pub culture". Noted Hindi choreographer Ahmed Khan directed the video.

== Release ==
The track was planned to be released as a single track separately ahead of the complete soundtrack album. Sify called this the first time a Tamil audio was releasing with a single track, although this is incorrect; the first Tamil film to have a single released before the whole album was Lesa Lesa (2002). It was supposed to be released at a grand function to be held in London, United Kingdom, where the entire cast and crew of the film, along with Trisha Krishnan were expected to participate. The event was supposed to take place on 17 October 2010, but was postponed since members of the team were denied visa by the British Consulate. The track release was eventually held on 1 December 2010 at the Citi Center in Chennai; Hansraj Saxena of Sun Pictures and director K. S. Ravikumar released the track, while Premji Amaran, lyricist Na. Muthukumar also took part in the occasion along with Silambarasan, Yuvan Shankar Raja and the director and producer of Vaanam, Krish and Ganesh, respectively.

== Response ==
Top10Cinema in its review gave a positive verdict, citing that "Simbu's heartfelt lyrics of romantic blast and Yuvan Shankar Raja's thundering Techno orchestrations throws high fever of musical feasts amongst the listeners and also grabs the attention of all the listeners. It’s sure to be a chartbuster of this year." Further claiming that "the simple and captivating lyrics of this song are sure to win the hearts of youngsters", the reviewer states it would become the "anthem of this season" for the younger generation, giving a verdict "Don’t wait to hear it. Experience the feel of love." According to the same site, the album had created a record with "good sales right on the first day of release itself." Sales executives cited that the single track was "a chartbuster", but was "highly downloaded in internet" and that "the trend of single track releases is something new to Kollywood", pointing to the price of the single (₹ 35), which was considered too high.

The new "strategical promotional concept" proved to be successful, as the song became widely popular and was declared a hit by trade pundits. The song particularly enjoyed popularity among the younger generation and had reportedly become a "rage among the youths." Composer Yuvan Shankar Raja himself, however, admitted that he was actually expecting both positive as well as negative feedback for the track.

Following the positive response, the Mumbai-based audio company Venus Music, who would market the album, expressed interest in a music video of the song in Hindi language. Silambarasan himself was asked to shoot for the music video, which would be premiered on Bollywood music channels. This would also mark Silambarasan's Bollywood debut. The song titled "Kaun Hai Baap Tera", featuring Silambarasan, is penned by Shabbir Ahmed.

== Controversy ==
The song also faced severe opposition for its provocative lyrics by Silambarasan. A women's rights organisation in Chennai criticised the lyrics and issued a statement to Silambarasan for the lyrics being "chauvinistic" that "demean women". Further it was argued that "music needs to appeal to larger sections than to the ‘thrill-seeking’ youth who are often misguided into ‘cheap thrills’ because of such songs", demanding censorship. However, several prominent people from the film industry came to support stating that there have been more objectionable scenes in films in the past and that there were "bigger issues in society" and applying censorship was not "the ideal way out in democracy."
