= Kazhugu (2012 film) =

2012 Indian film by Sathyasiva

- Theatrical release poster
- Directed by: Sathyasiva
- Written by: Sathyasiva
- Produced by: K. K. Sekhar; K. S. Madhubala
- Starring: Krishna; Bindu Madhavi
- Cinematography: Sathya Ponmar
- Edited by: Praveen K. L. N. B. Srikanth
- Music by: Yuvan Shankar Raja
- Production companies: Talking Times; Arun Film Entertainments
- Release date: 16 March 2012
- Country: India
- Language: Tamil

Kazhugu (transl. Eagle) is a 2012 Indian Tamil-language comedy thriller film written and directed by newcomer Sathyasiva, starring Krishna and Bindu Madhavi. The film, produced by Krishna's father K. K. Sekhar along with K. S. Madhubala, features music composed by Yuvan Shankar Raja. The story revolves around four persons, referred to as "Kazhugu", who recover the bodies of suicide victims who jump off a cliff. The film, based on real-life incidents, has been shot in real locations, including Kodaikanal, Theni, and Munnar. It had been in making since late 2010 and eventually released on 16 March 2012.

== Plot ==
Sera is a man who earns his living by retrieving dead bodies from Kodaikanal's Green Valley View suicide point. Nandu, Shanmugam, and a mute friend are part of Sera's crew. Sera meets Kavitha when he and his crew retrieve her sister's body from a gully after her sister had committed suicide with her boyfriend. Kavitha falls in love with Sera. A parallel plot is of Ayya, who trades in stolen tea, with corrupt officials turning a blind eye to his activities. Ayya's gang kills four police officers during a raid and throws the dead bodies from the suicide point. Ayya, who knows Shanmugam, threatens him not to retrieve the bodies of the police officers. Fearing for their lives, Shanmugam tries to convince Sera not to retrieve the bodies. Brushing aside Shanmugam's fears, Sera's crew retrieves the bodies. After retrieving the bodies, Sera informs the police of the murder by Ayya, resulting in Ayya's arrest. Ayya comes out on bail, and his men kill Shanmugam, Nandu, and Sera's mute friend, Kumar. Sera kills Ayya's henchmen. Kavitha consoles Sera, and they both decide to run away from Kodaikanal to lead a peaceful life. They both board a jeep, and on the way, Ayya arrives with his men, and they start attacking Sera. Sera kills most of them and also Ayya. He rushes back to the jeep but is shocked to see Kavitha dead. Sera understands that Kavitha was accidentally stabbed to death during the fight. Sera cries loud, jumps from the mountain, and kills himself along with Kavitha's dead body.

== Cast ==
- Krishna as Sera
- Bindu Madhavi as Kavitha
- Karunas as Nandu
- Thambi Ramaiah as Shanmugam (Chittappa @ Chithu)
- Jayaprakash as Ayya
- Nellai Siva as a Constable
- Halwa Vasu as a drunkard
- Nitish Veera as Maari, Ayya's henchman
- Praveen G. Vadivelu
- Sujibala as Valli
- Umashree as Kavitha's sister
- Visweswara Rao as Ramlal Seth
- Sampath Ram as a factory manager

Special appearances in promotional songs by (in alphabetical order):

- Aarthi
- Arya
- Divyadarshini
- Ganeshkar
- Jennifer
- Jiiva
- Kala
- Keerthi
- Linguswamy
- Oviya
- Pandiraj
- Perarasu
- Premji Amaren
- Priya Anand
- Pushpavanam Kuppusamy
- Radhika
- S. J. Surya
- Sanjeev
- Sivakarthikeyan
- Thaman
- Venkat Prabhu
- Vijayalakshmi
- Vishnuvardhan

== Soundtrack ==
Kazhugu

Soundtrack album to Kazhugu by Yuvan Shankar Raja
- Released: 22 February 2024
- Recorded: 2011
- Venue: Chennai
- Genre: Feature film soundtrack
- Length: 23:51
- Language: Tamil
- Label: Sony Music
- Producer: Yuvan Shankar Raja

Yuvan Shankar Raja chronology
Panjaa (2011)	Kazhugu (2024)	Rajapattai (2011)

The soundtrack of Kazhugu was composed by Yuvan Shankar Raja. He said he composed two of the songs keeping the visuals in mind after he had seen the video montages that were shot. The lyrics were penned by Na. Muthukumar, Snehan and Eaknath. The soundtrack album was released on 23 November 2011 at Sathyam Cinemas. In March 2012, the video of the song "Aambalaikum Pombalaikum" was released as a promo track featuring several film personalities from Tamil cinema (see cast).

Track listing
No.	Title	Lyrics	Singer(s)	Length
1.	"Aambalaikum Pombalaikum"	Snehan	Krishnaraj, Velmurugan, Sathyan	5:01
2.	"Aathadi Manasudhan"	Na. Muthukumar	Priya Himesh	5:09
3.	"Paathagathi Kannupattu"	Snehan	Yuvan Shankar Raja, Raju Krishnamurthy	4:30
4.	"Vaadi Vaadi"	Eaknath	Pushpavanam Kuppusamy, SuVi, Anitha Karthikeyan	4:01
5.	"Aathadi Manasudhan"	Na. Muthukumar	Karthik Raja	5:10
Total length:				23:44

== Critical response ==
A reviewer from Sify said Kazhugu was a "realistic romantic thriller that seldom loses its grip on your attention. Credible performances from its leads, a nail-biting screenplay along with a fresh milieu makes it an engaging film". The Times of India gave it 3.5 out of 5, claiming that it was "gripping from start to finish". Malathi Rangarajam from The Hindu wrote, "It's heartening to see young filmmakers daring to steer clear of stereotypes. S. Sathyasiva who makes his bow with Kazhugu is the latest in this category". She further cited that director Sathyasiva was "a director to watch out for". Pavithra Srinivasan from Rediff.com gave the film 2.5 out of 5 and commented: Kazhugu starts well but the extreme predictability of the screenplay makes sure that tedium sets in, leading to a rather tame climax".
