= Nesippaya =

2025 Indian film by Vishnuvardhan

- Theatrical release poster
- Directed by: Vishnuvardhan
- Written by: Vishnuvardhan; Neelan Sekar
- Produced by: S. Xavier Britto; Sneha Britto
- Starring: Akash Murali; Aditi Shankar
- Cinematography: Cameron Eric Bryson
- Edited by: A. Sreekar Prasad
- Music by: Yuvan Shankar Raja
- Production company: XB Film Creators
- Distributed by: Romeo Pictures
- Release date: 14 January 2025
- Running time: 147 minutes
- Country: India
- Language: Tamil

Nesippaya (transl. Will you love me?) is a 2025 Indian Tamil-language romantic action thriller film directed by Vishnuvardhan and produced by XB Film Creators. The film stars Akash Murali in his acting debut, alongside Aditi Shankar, R. Sarathkumar, Prabhu and Khushbu. The film has music composed by Yuvan Shankar Raja, cinematography handled by Cameron Eric Bryson and editing by A. Sreekar Prasad. Nesippaya was released in theatres on 14 January 2025.

== Plot ==
In 2016, during his college days, Arjun Vishwanathan fell in love with Diya Ramalingam. Their relationship is soon disrupted when Diya received a job offer in Portugal and she is prepared to relocate. When Arjun asks to accompany her to Portugal, she advised him to focus on his career and expresses her need for space in their relationship. Arjun informed both their families about their relationship, hoping to arrange their marriage before Diya's departure. Diya resisted the idea of immediate marriage, leading to a heated argument. A misunderstanding about a delayed visa application further escalated the situation, culminating in a public breakup.

Seven years later, Arjun, now running a software startup with his friend Subramaniaraju, is shocked to learn that Diya had been arrested in Portugal for murdering Karthik Adhinarayanan, the son of a wealthy and influential businessman, Adhinarayanan. Despite their breakup, Arjun immediately rushes to Portugal to help Diya. There, he meets Diya's mother, Geeta, and consults with Diya's lawyer, Indirani "Indira" Jahan, to understand the case. Arjun attempts to meet Adhinarayanan to plead on Diya's behalf but is dismissed by Adhinarayanan's business associate, Varadharajan. Diya, overwhelmed by guilt for avoiding Arjun in the past, refuses to meet him.

In prison, Diya is attacked by a fellow inmate, Jenni, resulting in hospitalisation. Determined to uncover the truth, Arjun sought out Monty, Jenni's lover, to gather information. Arjun had previously rescued Monty's sister from drug peddlers, but Monty refused to provide any information, hinting instead that Vasundhra, Karthik's mother, might be involved in orchestrating the attack on Diya. Arjun confronts Adhinarayanan prompting him to warn Vasundhra against further involvement and vows to seek justice for Diya through legal means. Indira visits Diya in prison, where Diya recounts the events leading up to the murder. After joining Adhinarayanan's company in Portugal, Diya befriended Karthik and his partner, Avik, who kept their relationship a secret from Karthik's father. When Avik began distancing himself from Karthik, Karthik turned to drugs, and Diya became his sole supporter. Varadharajan misinterpreted her friendship with Karthik as a romantic relationship and warned her to stay away. Diya returned to India, unaware that Adhinarayanan had arranged Karthik's marriage to Rakhi. Upon her return to Portugal, Karthik reached out to Diya, confessing his suicidal thoughts. Diya rushed to rescue him but was beaten by an unknown assailant. When she regained consciousness, she was arrested for Karthik's murder, with Rakhi as the key witness. Diya confides in Indira that she withheld the truth to protect Karthik's secret.

Indira and Arjun meet Rakhi, but she provides no information. That night, goons ambush them, but Arjun fights them off. With Monty's help, Arjun locates Avik, who reveals that Varadharajan forced Avik into hiding. Arjun deduces that Varadharajan orchestrated the events to secure his son Akash's control over Adhinarayanan's vast properties and suspects Varadharajan's involvement in Karthik's murder. Varadharajan's men shoot Avik, and Arjun narrowly escapes. Diya learns of Arjun's efforts to prove her innocence and apologises for her past actions. Their emotional reunion inspires Indira to reconcile with her estranged husband. Arjun attempts to expose Varadharajan's actions to Adhinarayanan but is caught and beaten by Varadharajan's men. He escapes with Monty's help and obtains a gun and car to negotiate with the government. Arjun hijacks a bus and demands that Special Officer Gautham bring Diya and Varadharajan to the scene. Varadharajan hires an assassin, Martin, to kill Arjun. However, Martin follows Adhinarayanan's instructions and shoots both Varadharajan and Arjun.

It is revealed that Adhinarayanan was aware of Karthik's sexual orientation and had threatened Avik to stay away. Adhinarayanan had also manipulated his mistress, Rakhi, into marrying Karthik. When Karthik discovered the truth, Adhinarayanan and Varadharajan conspired to murder him and framed Diya. Vasundhra, who had learned of Adhinarayanan's crimes through Akash, exposes him to the police. Humiliated and feeling ashamed, Adhinarayanan takes his own life. Gautham apprehends Martin, and Rakhi is arrested, clearing Diya of all the charges.

In a post-credits scene, Arjun, who survived the gunshot and was imprisoned for the hijacking, is released and finally reunites with Diya.

== Cast ==
- Akash Murali as Arjun Vishwanathan
- Aditi Shankar as Diya Ramalingam
- R. Sarathkumar as Adhinarayanan
- Prabhu as Gautham, Special officer
- Khushbu as Vasundhra Adhinarayanan
- Kalki Koechlin as Indirani Jahan "Indira", Portugal-based lawyer
- Shiv Panditt as Monty, Jenni's boyfriend
- Raja as Varadharajan
- George Kora as Karthik Adhinarayanan
- Murali Satagopan as Avik, Karthik's boyfriend
- Vikkals Vikram as Subramaniaraju "Subbu"
- Mathew Varghese as S. A. Vishwanathan, Arjun's father
- Sriranjani as Vaidehi, Arjun's mother
- Parvathi T as Geeta, Diya's mother
- Prajna Ravi as Arjun's sister

== Production ==
=== Development ===
In mid-April 2021, XB Film Creators announced their second project after Master under the tentative title Production No: 2 directed by Vishnuvardhan, introducing Akash Murali, son of actor Murali and the younger brother of Atharvaa. Akash who had married Sneha in August 2020 is the daughter of the film's producer Xavier Britto. Aditi Shankar was announced as the lead actress making her third venture, while she was simultaneously shooting for Maaveeran. In November 2023, Shiv Panditt who was last seen in Leelai (2012) was speculated to make his return to Tamil Cinema after 12 years for a special appearance along with Kalki Koechlin who previously worked together in Shaitan (2011). The official title was revealed in June 2024. In early July 2024 it was confirmed that Kalki Koechlin who was earlier seen in Nerkonda Paarvai (2019) and Paava Kadhaigal (2020) is seen to have portrayed a role of a Portugal based lawyer named Indira.

Music composer Yuvan Shankar Raja, editor A. Sreekar Prasad, cinematographer Cameron Eric Bryson and production designer Saravanan Vasanth were chosen for the technical crew.

=== Filming ===
Despite announcing in 2021, the principal photography commenced in March 2023 after a two-year delay. It was shot sporadically in several legs with filming locations including Portugal, Spain, and India, and wrapped by mid-February 2024.

== Music ==
Nesippaya

Soundtrack album by Yuvan Shankar Raja
- Released: January 4, 2025
- Studio: U1 Records
- Genre: Feature film soundtrack
- Length: 14:34
- Language: Tamil
- Label: T-Series
- Producer: Yuvan Shankar Raja

Yuvan Shankar Raja chronology
Parachute (2024)	Nesippaya (2025)	Aghathiyaa (2025)

Singles from Nesippaya
- 1. "Tholanja Manasu" Released: 11 October 2024; 2. "Solo Violin" Released: 31 October 2024; 3. "Nesippaya Nee Ennai" Released: 9 January 2025

External audio
- Nesippaya Full Album Audio Jukebox on YouTube

The music and soundtrack are composed by Yuvan Shankar Raja in his ninth collaboration with Vishnuvardhan. (Note: Yuvan Shankar Raja and Vishnuvardhan previously collaborated on Kurumbu (2003), Arinthum Ariyamalum (2005), Pattiyal (2006), Billa (2007), Sarvam (2009), Panjaa (2011), Arrambam (2013) and Yatchan (2015).) The first single "Tholanja Manasu" released on 11 October 2024. The second single "Solo Violin" released on 31 October 2024, coinciding with Diwali. The pre-release audio launch event was held on 3 January 2024 at Lady Andal auditorium. The third video single "Nesippaya Nee Ennai" released on 9 January 2025.

Track listing
No.	Title	Lyrics	Singer(s)	Length
1.	"Sol Nee Sol"	Pa. Vijay	Yuvan Shankar Raja	3:14
2.	"Yarra Iva"	Adesh Krishna	Yuvan Shankar Raja, Sathyaprakash	1:36
3.	"Tholanja Manasu"	Pa. Vijay	Yuvan Shankar Raja	2:49
4.	"Nesippaya Nee Ennai"	Vignesh Shivan	Javed Ali, Bela Shende	3:32
5.	"Solo Violin"	Pa. Vijay	Yuvan Shankar Raja, Haricharan	3:23
Total length:				14:34

== Release ==
=== Theatrical ===
Nesippaya released in theatres on 14 January 2025 coinciding with Pongal. The film has been certified U/A by the Central Board of Film Certification.

=== Distribution ===
Romeo Pictures acquired the distribution rights of the film in Tamil Nadu.

=== Home media ===
Nesippaya began streaming on both Sun NXT, Lionsgate Play and Amazon Prime Video on 16 May 2025.

== Reception ==
Avinash Ramachandran of The Indian Express gave 2.5/5 stars and wrote "Nesippaya is Vishnu Varadhan’s Roja, and it is the man who goes to the gallows to save his woman from certain death. It is poetic, heartwarming, indulgent, triumphant, and romantic. But it is also all over the place with an almost flat narrative that spends too much time in limbo before getting a life of its own towards the end." Roopa Radhakrishnan of The Times of India gave 2.5/5 stars and wrote "Nesippaya had so much promise with its cast of proven talents and an intriguing basic premise, but the film never reaches up to its expectations. [...] it tries to stick to a standard and seen-before template, which further works against the film's favour."

Jayabhuvaneshwari B of Cinema Express gave 2.5/5 stars and wrote "Nesippaya tries to craft an everlasting tale of romance, but its inconsistencies make it feel more like a forgettable affair. For all its noble intentions, Nesippaya struggles to transcend its safe tropes and predictable beats." Anusha Sundar of OTTPlay gave 2.5/5 stars and wrote "Nesippaya is a racy thriller entwined with romance. [...] A certain revelation and character arc may be found under-utilized, but Nesippaya comes out as a decent entertainer that could have been a lot better."

Raisa Nasreen of Times Now gave 2/5 stars and wrote " Nesippaya, a thrilling suspense drama is powered by the film's highly relatable dialogues, well-sketched characters and actor Kalki Koechlin's incredible performance.[...] Overall, the film could have packed a punch with sharp and short storytelling but it limps into the race." Janani K of India Today gave 2/5 stars and wrote "Nesippaya is director Vishnuvardhan's weakest film yet. The suspense drama suffers because of predictability and lacks any big suspense." Bhuvanesh Chandar of The Hindu wrote "Nesippaya could have become something more than ordinary; it only confuses you about the kind of film it wishes to be. The thriller that follows is trite, predictable and contrived, to put it straight."
