= Remiyan =

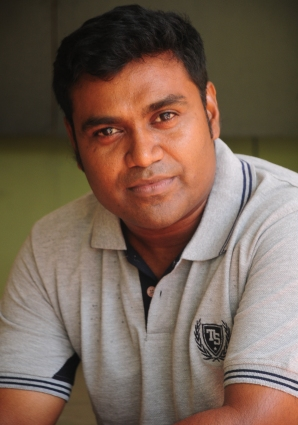
- Born: 20 July 1969 (age 56); Pondicherry, India
- Other names: Gerard Maubel De Remy
- Occupations: Art director and production designer
- Years active: 2000 – present

Gerard Maubel De Remy, known as Remiyan (born 20 July 1969) is an art director and production designer of Indian film industry, most known for his work in Tamil films like Arinthum Ariyamalum (2005), Pattiyal (2006), Devan (2002), Alai (2003), Ninaithaley Inikkum (2009), Kannamoochi yenada (2007), Alibaba (2008) etc.

== Early life and education ==
Remiyan was born in Pondicherry. He did his schooling in NNGHSS, Lasspet. He did his graduation in fine arts at the Pondicherry College of arts, and Post- Graduation in Journalism and Mass communication at the Madurai Kamaraj University.

== Career ==
Remiyan started his career as an architectural model maker under renowned architect Francis, one of the designers for the famous Matru Mandir Auroville. He has also worked as a silk painting designer at the Auromodel Atelier at Auroville, Pondicherry. Later he moved to Chennai and worked as an architectural miniaturist and elevation designer.

Remiyan started his film career as an assistant art director with famous art directors in Tamil film industry like B. G Mahi and G. K. He worked in more than 20 films as assistant art director. He was also the production designer for the TV series called Chitthi (2000) for Radaan communications.

His first feature film was Punnagai Desam (2002) for super good films. Remiyan's work in films like Alai (2003) and Arindhum Ariyamalum (2005) got him noticed in the Tamil film industry. He.had also designed the sets for the noted Television shows like Naalaiya Eiyakkunar, Jodi Poruttham and Odi vilayadu pappa for Sun network, Zee TV, Kalainger TV etc.

Currently he is working on Ramkumar's Ethiri Enn 3, Pattiyal Sekar's Kazhugu and Ambuli (3D).

== Filmography ==
- Punnagai Desam (2002)
- Devan (2002)
- Alai (2003)
- Kurumbu (2003)
- Student Number 1 (2003)
- Yes Madam (2003)
- Girivalam (2004)
- Jor (2004)
- Sinthamal Sitharamal (2004)
- Semarahalai (2004)
- Arindhum Ariyamalum (2005)
- Pattiyal (2006)
- Yuga (2006)
- Maa Madurai (2007)
- Kannamoochi Yenada (2207)
- Piragu (2007)
- Machakaaran (2007)
- Alibhabha (2008)
- Boys & Girls (2008)
- Ninaithale Inikkum (2009)
- Thottupaar (2010)
- Singam Puli (2011)
- Kazhugu (2012)
- Ambuli (2012)
