= Sarvam =

2009 film by Vishnuvardhan

- Promotional Poster
- Directed by: Vishnuvardhan
- Screenplay by: Vishnuvardhan; A. Gokul Krishna
- Story by: Vishnuvardhan
- Produced by: K. Karunamoorthy; C. Arunpandian
- Starring: Arya; Trisha; J. D. Chakravarthy; Indrajith; Rohan Shiva
- Cinematography: Nirav Shah
- Edited by: Sreekar Prasad
- Music by: Yuvan Shankar Raja
- Production company: Ayngaran International
- Distributed by: Ayngaran International
- Release date: 15 May 2009
- Running time: 143 minutes
- Country: India
- Language: Tamil

Sarvam (transl. Everything) is a 2009 Indian Tamil-language hyperlink action thriller film co-written and directed by Vishnuvardhan. The film stars Arya, Trisha, J. D. Chakravarthy, Indrajith, and Rohan Shiva. The film, which had been under production since late 2006, was produced and distributed by K. Karunamoorthy and C. Arunpandian under the banner of Ayngaran International Films. It was filmed by Nirav Shah and edited by Sreekar Prasad. The film's soundtrack, composed by Yuvan Shankar Raja, was released on 14 February 2009, coinciding with Valentine's Day.

The film revolves around five individual characters and the events that change everything in their lives, which the film's title refers to, and also brings them together. It contains two parallel stories that are connected by a freak accident in Chennai. A young architect falls in love with a young, beautiful pediatric doctor, runs after her, and tries to convince her to marry her. Simultaneously, a morose ex-football coach troubles a software engineer by vowing to kill his eight-year-old son. How these characters get connected and confronted through the accident forms the crux of the story.

After several postponements, the film was released worldwide on 15 May 2009 to mixed reviews and became an average grosser.

== Plot ==
The film opens with a fight between two individuals on a rainy night in a deep, dark forest. In the opening scene, a title card is presented with an Upanishad quote: "Death is just the beginning of another life".

Karthik is a carefree architect who comes across Sandhya, a pediatrician, in a go-kart race. Karthik immediately falls in love with Sandhya and wants to convince her to marry him. Karthik finds out several facts about Sandhya and arranges a meeting by pretending that she caused a car accident and damaged his car. When that approach fails, he goes to the hospital where Sandhya works, becoming a regular visitor and making efforts to woo her. Sandhya, however, has other interests and shows no signs of reciprocating his love. She believes that Karthik is too carefree and not serious about life. One day, Sandhya's parents tell her about her to-be-fixed marriage. She finally recognizes that Karthik is the right match and slowly develops a deep love for him. She wholeheartedly agrees with the marriage.

Simultaneously, a morose, mysterious man, Eashwar, who always moves around with his Rottweiler, goes to see Naushad, a software engineer who happily lives with his eight-year-old son Imaan. A few months ago, Naushad had accidentally hit and killed Eashwar's wife Geetha and son Naveen in a car crash. Eashwar, apparently mentally disturbed, keeps murmuring that Naushad was solely responsible for their deaths. Eashwar keeps following Naushad, telling him that he will feel the same pain only when his own son dies. A workmate of Naushad informs him that Eashwar had visited him and requested information about Naushad, and tells him to be aware. He and his son escape to his friend's place near Elliot's Beach, Chennai.

Meanwhile, Karthik and Sandhya, who happily spend time together, are ready for marriage and make plans for the future. Karthik then suddenly asks Sandhya to postpone their marriage for a year. However, Sandhya insists on marrying at the earliest possible date. To solve this problem, they decide to hold a cycling race across a road on Elliot's Beach so that the winner makes the decision, which the loser must accept. At the same time, Imaan and his friend fly a kite on the terrace of Naushad's friend. Suddenly, Imaan faints and falls, which distracts the boys, and they let the kite fly away. Sandhya, who is ahead of Karthik and leading the race, rides straight into the kite thread, which cuts her neck, fatally injuring her. She dies in the hospital from blood loss.

Six months later, Sandhya's father visits Karthik, who is under depression following her death, and informs him that even after death, Sandhya has saved the life of a child, since her heart has been transplanted into a boy, who happens to be Imaan. Karthik becomes emotional and overjoyed that at least one part of his love is alive, and goes to meet Naushad and Imaan. He finds out that they have left their home in Chennai and moved to Munnar in Kerala. He travels to Munnar to see them and feels happy again, while learning from a grateful Naushad that Imaan suffered from cardiomyopathy and Sandhya's heart had saved his life. Meanwhile, Eashwar, who had followed Karthik, also arrives in Munnar, where he meets a car mechanic Syed (who used to play professional football with Eashwar), and allows Eashwar to stay at his home.

Karthik goes to see the father and son one last time before returning to Chennai, when suddenly, a car hits Imaan. Karthik, who was just ready to go home, comes back and saves Imaan. Shocked by that incident, Karthik does not believe that it was merely an accident and wants the truth from Naushad, who has been admitted to the hospital after having been injured in the accident. Karthik then learns about Eashwar, who was the man in the car, and his intentions. Eashwar has bought the same car that killed his family and seeks revenge for their death by killing Imaan in return. Karthik decides to take Imaan to a nearby place where he had stayed before, promising Naushad that he will protect and look after Imaan.

Subsequently, Karthik tries to befriend Imaan, who dislikes him and wants to stay with his father. When they later travel by car, Karthik and Eashwar encounter each other, and Eashwar threatens Karthik. A cat-and-mouse chase follows, where Eashwar wants to dispose of Karthik to get to Imaan and kill him. Syed sees Eashwar chasing Karthik and offers to help after hiring some local goons, who will kill both silently without mentioning Eashwar's and Syed's names. One night, after mixing snake venom in their knife, the goons reach Imaan's house, scratch Karthik's waist with that knife, and Karthik slightly faints due to the snake poison; however, he summons his strength, fights the goons back, and protects Imaan.

However, Eashwar finds the still-alive Karthik and Imman in the heart of the forest. A fight ensues, with Eashwar initially gaining the upper hand and beating Karthik, who becomes unconscious due to the snake venom and falls into a grave, which Eashwar then fills after to kill him, and hunts Imaan down in a derelict church. However, Karthik reemerges from the grave and attacks Eashwar, overpowering him and breaking his arm and leg, paralyzing him for life, albeit sparing him alive.

A now-paralyzed Eashwar is admitted to the hospital and treated for his condition. Karthik escorts Imaan and Naushad back to Chennai from Munnar and makes them stay with him in his new house, which he had constructed for Sandhya.

== Cast ==
- Arya as Karthik
- Trisha as Dr. Sandhya
- J. D. Chakravarthy as Eashwar
- Indrajith as Naushad
- Rohan Shiva as Imaan, Naushad's son
- Krishna as Krishna, Karthik's friend
- Wasim as Syed
- T. M. Karthik as Naren
- Ravi Prakash as Sandhya's father
- Sriranjani as Sandhya's mother
- Ramanathan as Naushad's friend
- Sachin as Sachin
- Anu Haasan as Geetha, Eashwar's wife (cameo role)
- Prathap Pothan as a psychiatrist (cameo role)

== Production ==
=== Development ===
In June 2006, B Studios and Studio Green announced that they would co-produce the production of Vishnuvardhan's Sarvam, which would have Suriya and Ileana D'Cruz . After the film was supposedly dropped, though it was already started in October 2006 with a photo shoot for the film, the project was revived just one week later. The restarted film was first to be produced by Surya's cousin, K. E. Gnanavelraja, who earlier produced the Surya-starring Sillunu Oru Kaadhal and was producing the award-winning film Paruthiveeran, starring Surya's brother, Karthi, at that time. However, he suddenly backed out of the project for unknown reasons and Vishnuvardhan, looking for another producer, approached 'Aascar' Ravichandran and the Malaysian RJ, 'Punnagai Poo' Gheetha, who produced Vishnuvardhan's Arinthum Ariyamalum and Pattiyal as well, and director Saran to produce the film, who all opted out. Later, Surya also opted out of the project, and after Vishnuvardhan tried to cast R. Madhavan in his film, which also failed for unknown reasons, the film was finally shelved in December 2006 and Vishnuvardhan instead started to film the remake of the 1980 Rajinikanth-starring Billa, titled Billa as well, starring Ajith Kumar in the lead role.

In August 2007, when Vishnuvardhan was still working on Billa, it was reported, that he had not given up on Sarvam and wanted to restart the film once Billa is finished and released, with Arya in the lead role. It was also rumored that composer Yuvan Shankar Raja would produce the film, which turned out be wrong, with K. Karunamoorthy and C. Arunpandian taking over the project and producing it under the banner of Ayngaran International. Filming began in May 2008 with Arya, Trisha and J. D. Chakravarthy .

The film was first reported to be a remake of the 1986 Hollywood thriller The Hitcher and later to be a remake of another Hollywood film, the 2003 drama 21 Grams.

=== Casting ===
Initially, when Vishnuvardhan started the project in September 2006, he had signed up Surya to play the lead role, pairing up with the Mumbai model and former child actress Hansika Motwani, who was to make her debut in the Tamil film industry. Hansika Motwani was chosen after Vishnuvardhan had approached several actresses for that role, who ultimately refused to accept the offer for various reasons. First he tried to rope in Telugu actress Ileana, who reportedly demanded a remuneration of Rs 1 crore 75 lakhs, so she was dropped and Nila and Anushka were approached and the latter got the role, since Nila demanded too much as well. The project started and even a photo shooting featuring both the actors was held, before Surya had to opt out of the project, because he had earlier signed to star in Gautham Vasudev Menon's Vaaranam Aayiram. By November 2006, R. Madhavan was announced as the hero of the film, before the film was finally shelved in December 2006.

In November 2007, after Vishnuvardhan had finished his Billa, which was due to release, he restarted his shelved project Sarvam and started to scout his cast for the film again and reports say that again Surya was considered for the role, before supposedly Arjun was confirmed for the leading role with Arya playing the second lead. Reports indicated that the script has been changed several times to suit the lead actors; Vishnuvardhan, however, confirmed that the script did not change, stating that there are similarities between Surya and Arya and the script suited both and therefore change was not necessary. Sarvam was Arya's first film after Naan Kadavul, with which he was engaged for more than two years and for which he had grown a long, thick beard. In contrast to that, Sarvam features him as a romantic lover hero, whereby he had to remove the beard and, hence, the "Old Arya returned". Actually, Vishnuvardhan said, Arya's transition from Naan Kadavul to Sarvam was very difficult, since Naan Kadavul was a "lengthy process", where Arya had "forgotten the real in him". This was the third film in which Vishnuvardhan and Arya worked together after Arinthum Ariyamalum and Pattiyal, with Arya stating that Vishnuvardhan knows him "in and out" and that he was able to bring out the "best and finer aspects" of him, knowing his strengths and weaknesses, while Vishnuvardhan confessed that working with Arya was comfortable. Arya later also mentioned that the role of Karthik was the best role he had ever played in his film career, since the character had "many shades" as romantic, serious and emotional and there was "so much of variation".

Trisha eventually got the role of Sandhya after several actresses, including Hansika Motwani, Anushka Shetty, Nila, and Ileana, were considered and opted out. This marked her first collaboration with Arya. According to Vishnuvardhan, Trisha, though she is not a new entrant, looks "very fresh" in the film, which, he believes, is because of her co-star Arya. Besides, she has an "interesting quality", which is her "innocent smile irrespective of her mischievousness", Vishnuvardhan states, which was "very essential" for the character and the reason for giving her the role.

The antagonist role was first offered to Arjun, who, fearing of his image, rejected the role, as later did "two leading actors" as well as Malayalam actor Mohanlal. Popular Hindi actor Nana Patekar was also considered for the role, who, however, rejected as well, after which the role went to Kannada actor Upendra, who did a negative role in the Tamil film Sathyam at the same time. Eventually Vishnuvardhan roped in Telugu actor J. D. Chakravarthy for the same role, replacing Upendra. Through Sarvam, Chakravarthy came back to the Tamil film industry nearly seven years after having starred in Mani Ratnam's 2002 film Kannathil Muthamittal. He got the role of Eashwar, replacing Upendra, who again was signed after Arjun, Mohanlal, and Nana Patekar had refused the offer. Vishnuvardhan once mentioned that Chakravarthy has a "spaced out look about him" which was needed for his character in the film.

Apart from these three actors, Malayalam actor Indrajith Sukumaran, brother of well-known actor Prithviraj Sukumaran, who acts in his second direct Tamil film after En Mana Vaanil (2002); a child actor, Rohan Shiva, playing the 8-year-old Imaan; and a Rottweiler dog play important roles in the film. Rohan Shiva was signed for the role of Imaan after 100–150 boys were tested for eight months. Vishnuvardhan finally chose Imaan, citing that "he is not handsome, but there is something very cute about him". Wasim was introduced by Vishnuvardhan in this film, who he cites as "so natural" as the other actors as well that you "tend to forget that it is cinema".

For the technical crew, Vishnuvardhan roped in mostly "his usual members", who had worked with the director on his earlier projects, including Yuvan Shankar Raja as the music director, Nirav Shah as the cinematographer, Sreekar Prasad as the editor, Pa. Vijay as the lyricist, Thiyagarajan as the stunt co-ordinator and Vishnuvardhan's wife, Anu Vardhan, as the costume designer. For Sarvam, Dinesh and Geetha joined Kalyan as the choreographer and Manu Jagadh replaced as Remiyan as the art director.

=== Filming ===
Shooting for Sarvam was held for nearly nine months in various locations, including exotic places never before seen on film. It started in June 2008 after Vishnuvardhan returned from the Cannes Film Festival, where his film Billa was screened, and after Arya had completed Naan Kadavul, for which filming was held for nearly one and a half years. The first half of the film was shot in and around Chennai, while the second half was shot in Kerala, mostly in deep forests, hence, the first half would be very "colourful", while the mood in the second half completely changes, getting "rainy, misty and completely green and dark".

Before Vishnuvardhan left for Cannes, he had already shot a few scenes at Marina Beach in Chennai that did not involve Arya, who was still busy with Naan Kadavul. Afterwards, shooting was held at various places in and around the city, including the "Gemini Parsn Apartment" near the Gemini flyover, Elliot's Beach in Besant Nagar, the flyover at Kathipara Junction and at the San Thome Basilica in Santhome in Chennai, where scenes for the first half of the film as well as some song sequences were filmed.

In August 2008, the crew shifted its base to Kerala, where major parts of the second half were filmed. In Munnar a romantic duet between Arya and Trisha was shot for which grand sets had been erected by art director Manu Jagadh. The team then moved to the "Dhoni forest" in Palakkad district in Kerala, where several crucial scenes, including the climax, were shot. For the climax scene, a 90-foot-tall dilapidated church was built and made to look 150 years old, while the remaining part of the climax was shot back in Chennai at Prasad Studio, where again a huge set was erected by Manu Jagadh. Other filming locations in Kerala include Cochin, Kannoor and Chalakudy.

In June 2008, two people were killed in an accident at the shooting spot, which was located at an under-construction building near the Gemini flyover in Chennai. A lift, which was installed to carry materials to the eighth floor of the building, where filming was to be held, collapsed suddenly, killing two technicians, who were working on the lift. After actor J. D. Chakravarthy, too, was injured in a stunt sequence, it was reported that Vishnuvardhan had decided to change the film title, but this did not happen.

The songs were filmed at several places around India, including in Tamil Nadu, Goa, Kerala and Gujarat. A folk song ("Sutta Suriyana") was shot in a Chennai studio, choreographed by Dinesh and focusing on the lead couple, Arya and Trisha. Another song ("Neethane"), which was choreographed by Kalyan, was filmed on the new bridge at the Kathipara Junction, Chennai, and the Indian Air Force base at Cholavaram. A fourth song ("Kaatrukulle"), focusing again on Arya and Trisha, was shot in late September and October at the beaches in Goa and a lake in Ladakh and was choreographed by Geetha, a student of the choreographer Farah Khan. In the first weeks of February, the last song, a romantic duet, choreographed by Dinesh, involving the lead couple once more ("Siragugal"), was shot at the Rann of Kutch, a saline clay desert in Gujarat, close to the Pakistan border, according to Vishnuvardhan, a location that was never before used or seen in a Tamil film.

With this song, the shooting was wrapped up in February 2009 and post-production works began.

== Music ==
The album comprises five tracks, lyrics for which were written by Vishnuvardhan's "usual lyricist", Pa. Vijay. Out of the five tracks, two were sung by composer Yuvan Shankar Raja himself and one by his father Ilaiyaraaja. According to the director, two of the songs ("Neethane" and "Sutta Suriyana") were composed by Yuvan Shankar Raja even before Vishnuvardhan's previous venture, Billa, had started, when Sarvam was first announced in October 2006, nearly two years earlier. The song "Adada Vaa" was originally composed for the film Aayirathil Oruvan, for which Yuvan Shankar Raja was first signed to score the music, but which he left in the midst, after he had a fall out with director Selvaraghavan.

== Release ==
The film's release had been postponed several times due to various reasons, before it was eventually released on 15 May 2009 worldwide by Ayngaran International Films along with Raghava Lawrence's Rajadhi Raja, another Ayngaran production, following the 2009 Indian election, though it was reported that the film would not release until June 2009, following the 2009 IPL Cricket season, which would end on 24 May 2009. The Indian censor board had certified the film on 21 April 2009, giving it a U certificate without any cuts. The film had an average gross in the box office but was praised by some critics. Nearly one year later, the film was dubbed to be released in Telugu under the same title and was also dubbed in Hindi as Wardaat – The Revenge.

== Marketing ==
After a muted publicity campaign, Ayngaran International Films finally released a teaser poster in January 2009 that showed the five main characters, Karthik, Sandhya, Imaan, Naushad and Eashwar, on their website along with some other images. The trailer of the film was screened during the interval of the Vijay-starring Villu, which was released during Pongal 2009 on 12 January 2009 and was an Ayngaran International production as well. On 19 January Ayngaran released the trailer exclusively on their website, after which the trailer was screened on various Tamil television channels. In February 2009, an official website was launched by Ayngaran International and later Sify launched a special site about the film on their respective website. Just before the Sarvam soundtrack was launched, Ayngaran released promotional audio clips of the songs of a duration of nearly four minutes overall, following which another one-minute teaser trailer that features video clippings of three of the songs ("Adada Vaa", "Siragugal" and "Sutta Suriyana") was released by Ayngaran one month after the audio launch. A few days before the film was released, the Galatta Cinema Magazine delivered a "Sarvam special edition", dedicating its cover story to Sarvam.

== Reception ==
Upon release, Sarvam gained mixed reviews by critics, with the majority claiming that the film failed to live up to the expectations. Generally, the film was described as "stylish" and "visually attractive" and its (snail-paced) screenplay as the sore point. Sify labelled the film as a "visual treat", stating that the film is good in parts, has a "wafer thin storyline" and "banks heavily on style and gloss". Praise was addressed to director Vishnuvardhan for trying to make a "different film" and for reworking the "Kollywood commercial formula". Technical aspects of the film were immensely lauded, especially Nirav Shah's cinematography, which "works big-time for the film", as well as Yuvan Shankar Raja's music and background score, and Manu Jagadh's art work, while Thyagaran's "close combat action scenes" were cited as "spellbinding". Overall, the film was described as a "decent thriller".

Malathi Rangarajan from The Hindu gave the film an average review, stating that "the recipe is perfect but the dish isn’t wholly delicious" and that the film has "the ingredients of a potential hit except the most essential, a gripping screenplay". Like Sify, Rangarajan, too, praised the technicians, describing Nirav Shah's camera works as "excellent" and Yuvan Shankar Raja's melodies as "lilting" and the score as "foot-tapping", while the lead pair, consisting of Arya and Trisha, was cited as "attractive". Pavithra Srinivasan from Rediff gave the film 2 out of 5 stars, citing Sarvam to be "lacklustre" and that "it does not stand up to the hype". According to Srinivasan, the first half of the film is the "best part", criticizing the screenplay, which takes a "nosedive post the intermission", and claiming that the second half has "lacklustre performances" and "logicless scenes". She, too, praised the technical crew of the film, labelling Yuvan Shankar Raja's background score as "marvellous", which "just proves how good he can be", Nirav Shah's cinematography as "scintillating", the visuals as "astonishing" and Anu Vardhan's costumes as "excellent", while Manu Jagadh has done "wonders with his sets" and Sreekar Prasad's editing "fits the bill". Overall, she states that the film is worth a watch for the "stunning visuals", "musical score" and "Trisha's sequence", who she says is "perhaps the only shining part of the movie itself".
