= Arrambam (soundtrack) =

Soundtrack album to Arrambam by Yuvan Shankar Raja
- Released: 19 September 2013
- Recorded: 2013
- Genre: Feature film soundtrack
- Length: 21:44
- Language: Tamil
- Label: Sony Music India
- Producer: Yuvan Shankar Raja

Yuvan Shankar Raja chronology
Biriyani (2013)	Arrambam (2013)	Vanavarayan Vallavarayan (2014)

Arrambam is the soundtrack album, composed by Yuvan Shankar Raja, to the 2013 film of the same name, directed by Vishnuvardhan starring Ajith Kumar, Arya, Nayantara and Taapsee Pannu. The album consists of six tracks. Pa. Vijay penned all lyrics for the songs. It was released on 19 September 2013. The album opened at number one on iTunes India within a few minutes after its release at midnight, which, according to Sify, "no Tamil album has done before".

== Production ==
Yuvan Shankar Raja was signed on to compose the film's soundtrack and score, becoming his sixth project starring Ajith Kumar. In November 2012, Yuvan Shankar Raja composed a new song for the film. On 23 April 2013 the composer tweeted that he had completed three songs, and that one of which was a "grand intro song" rendered by Shankar Mahadevan. Vijay Yesudas stated that he had sung a "celebration song" in the film.

In August 2013 it was reported that Vairamuthu's younger son Kabilan Vairamuthu was enlisted to pen lyrics for a song in the film, his first time working with Yuvan. His lyrics were scrapped later and all five songs were written by Pa. Vijay only.

The music rights were sold to Sony Music India.

== Release ==
Yuvan Shankar Raja had handed over the master copy of the audio to the film's producer on 21 August and it was reported that the soundtrack would release on 9 September for Vinayagar Chaturthi. On 14 September 2013, Sony Music India announced that the album would be released directly to stores on 19 September, while also revealing the track list.

== Reception ==
The album was a commercial success. Upon its release on 19 September, at midnight, the album immediately reached number one spot on the iTunes India store. Sify wrote that no Tamil album had achieved this feat before. Ashok Parwani, General Manager at Sony Music, stated that it had done "very well from a sales perspective". The CDs were sold out within two days and the second batch of hit the stores on 23 September.

== Track listing ==
All tracks are written by Pa. Vijay except where noted.

No.	Title	Lyrics	Singer(s)	Length
1.	"Adadada Arrambame"		Shankar Mahadevan	3:47
2.	"En Fuse Pochu"		Karthik, Ramya NSK	4:43
3.	"Hare Rama (Not featured in the film)"		Tanvi Shah, Shakthisree Gopalan	4:18
4.	"Melala Vedikudhu"		Vijay Yesudas, Ranjith, Shweta Mohan	4:32
5.	"Stylish Thamizhachi"	Rubba.Bend	M. M. Manasi, Rubba.Bend (Psycho Unit)	4:24
Total length:				21:44

== Personnel ==
=== Instruments ===
- Live Drums & Percussion: V. Kumar
- Additional keyboards: Sivaranjan
- String instruments: R. A. Amalraj
- Flute: Napoleon
- Shenoy: Baalesh

=== Production ===
- Program Manager: V. Karthik
- Program Co-ordination: A. S. Subbiah
- Recorded at: Prasad Studios & Unique Studios, Chennai
- Recorded by: M. Kumaraguruparan, Bharani & Prabhakar
- Mixed at Pinkstone Studios, Chennai
- Mixed and mastered by M. Kumaraguruparan
