= Krishnakumar Ramakumar =

Indian actor

- Born: Chennai, India
- Other name: Five Star Krishna
- Occupations: Film director Advertisement; Actor
- Years active: 2002–present
- Spouse: Gowri Krishnakumar

Krishnakumar Ramakumar (born 18 October 1979), sometimes known as Five Star Krishna, is an Indian film director, filmmaker, and actor, who primarily works in the Tamil film industry. He is the founder of Black Box Films, a Chennai-based production house.

== Early life ==
Krishna was born in Chennai, Tamil Nadu. He studied Visual Communication at Loyola College, Chennai. Before entering films, he worked as an assistant director under Latha Menon and Rajiv Menon.

== Career ==
=== Acting ===
Krishna made his acting debut with Five Star(2002), directed by Susi Ganesan, produced by Mani Ratnam and G. Srinivasan. His performance received positive reviews from critics. "there are scenes where he could have underplayed his emotions a little — but surely the young man has talent".. He later appeared in films including Cheran's Autograph, Mani Ratnam's Aaytha Ezhuthu, while also appearing as Dhanush's brother in the romantic comedy, Thiruda Thirudi. and several films directed by Vishnuvardhan, featuring in four consecutive ventures.

=== Advertisement filmmaking ===
In 2009, Krishna founded Black Box Films, an advertisement production company based in Chennai. Since then, he has directed more than 500+ television and digital commercials for brands including Tanishq, Amazon, Myntra, Facebook, Zoho, Swiggy, Paper Boat, Pothys, Parle, Milk Bikis, OLX and GRT. His campaigns have featured several Indian actors and personalities, including Kamal Haasan.

=== Directing ===
Krishna directed the episode Kaadhal Enbadhu Kannula Heart Irukkura Emoji in the anthology series Modern Love Chennai (2023).

In 2025, he made his feature film directorial debut with Oho Enthan Baby and was produced by Vishnu Vishal Studioz and Romeo Pictures. The post-theatrical streaming rights have been acquired by Netflix.

His latest film is the biopic G.D.N based on Gopalswamy Doraiswamy Naidu with R. Madhavan playing the title role. Produced by Varghese Moolan and Vijay Moolan under Varghese Moolan Pictures in association with Mediamax productions and R.Madhavan and Sarita Birje's banner, Tricolour Films.

== Filmography ==
=== Actor ===
Year	Film	Role	Notes
2002	Five Star	Ilango	
2003	Thiruda Thirudi	Vasu's brother	
2003	Thirumalai	Krishna	
2004	Autograph	Kamalakannan	
2004	Aaytha Ezhuthu	Trilok	
2005	Arinthum Ariyamalum	Krishna	
2005	Daas	Naseer	
2006	Aathi	Suicide Victim	
2006	Saravana	Krish	
2006	Pattiyal	Krishna	
2007	Ninaithaley	Narayanan	
2008	Jayamkondaan	Krishna	
2008	Seval		
2009	Ananda Thandavam	Krishna	
2009	Sarvam	Krishna	
2009	Naan Avan Illai 2	Mahalakshmi's husband	
2010	Thillalangadi	Venkat	
2010	Vaadaa	Muthu	
2011	Aaranya Kaandam	Astrologer	
2011	Yuvan Yuvathi	Krishna	
2013	Madras Cafe	Bomb Maker	
2013	Moodar Koodam	Naaikaran	
2013	Arrambam	Mango	
2014	Aaha Kalyanam	Akhilan	
2015	Yatchan	Logu	
2015	Vellaiya Irukiravan Poi Solla Maatan	Varma	
2017	Kavan	Ashok	
2022	Trigger	Prabhakaran's brother	
2025	Oho Enthan Baby	Astrologer	Uncredited appearance; also director
2025	Maareesan	Siva Selvam	
2026	G.D.N		Cameo

=== Director ===
Year	Title	Notes
2023	Modern Love Chennai	Prime Video web series, director of episode "Kaadhal Enbadhu Kannula Heart Irukkura Emoji"
2025	Oho Enthan Baby	
2026	G.D.N	
