= Maindhan =

Maindhan may refer to:

- Maindhan (1994 film), an Indian Tamil-language drama film
- Maindhan (2014 film), a Tamil-language Malaysian action comedy film
