= Neelan K. Sekar =

Indian filmmaker and screenwriter

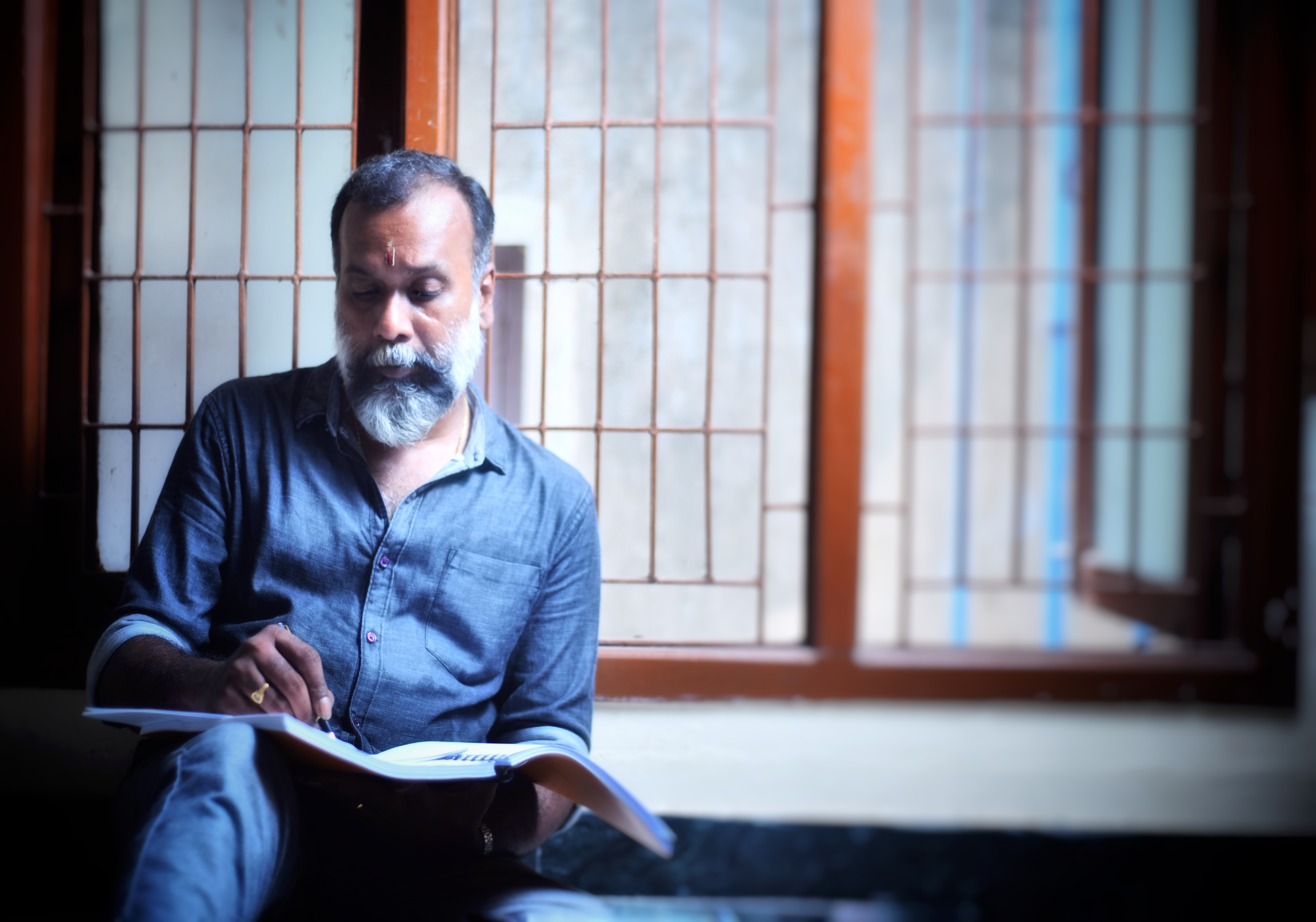
- Neelan Sekar
- Born: Neelambaradhan
- Occupation: Director, screenwriter
- Years active: 2005-present
- Notable works: Super Deluxe

Neelan K. Sekar is an Indian film director and screenwriter known for his work in the Tamil film industry, predominantly writing screenplays.

== Early life ==
He was inspired by films like Three Way Love (1973), Ninaithale Inikkum (1979), Muthal Mariyathai (1985), Manichitrathazhu (1993), and Gunaa (1992) as well as the works of K. Viswanath like Siri Siri Muvva (1976), Sankarabharanam (1980), Salangai Oli (1983). His favourite authors include Leo Tolstoy, B. Jeyamohan and Jayakanthan.

== Career ==
Regarding his directorial debut Alibhabha (2008), a critic wrote, "On the whole Neelan definitely has the stuff in him, for a first timer his screenplay and narration is impressive, but towards the end goes overboard."

== Filmography ==
=== Films ===
==== As director and writer ====
Year	Work	Credited as		Notes	Ref.
Year	Work	Direction	Screenplay	Notes	Ref.
2005	Arinthum Ariyamalum	Associate	Yes		
2008	Alibhabha	Yes	Yes		
2012	Naan		Dialogues		
2019	Super Deluxe		Yes		
2020	Soorarai Pottru		Screenplay	Screenplay supervision only	
2021	Maara		Screenplay	Screenplay supervision only	
2021	C/O Kaadhal		Dialogues		
2022	Cobra		Dialogues		
2025	Nesippaya		Yes		

==== As an actor ====
Year	Title	Ref.
2005	Arinthum Ariyamalum	
2006	Pattiyal	
2012	Naan	
2017	Yaman	
2019	Super Deluxe	

=== Television ===
Year	Title	Role	Network	Notes	Ref.
2021	Fingertip		Zee5	As screenplay writer	
2022	Jhansi		Disney+ Hotstar	Telugu series; as screenplay supervisor	
2023	The Village	Ponraj	Disney+ Hotstar		

== Awards and nominations ==
Year	Film	Award	Category	Result	Ref.
2020	Super Deluxe	Ananda Vikatan Cinema Awards	Best Screenplay	Won	
2020	Super Deluxe	Critics Choice Film Awards	Best Screenplay	Won	
