= Arrambam =

2013 Indian film by Vishnuvardhan

- Theatrical release poster
- Directed by: Vishnuvardhan
- Written by: Vishnuvardhan; Subha
- Produced by: A. Raghuram; A. M. Rathnam (presenter)
- Starring: Ajith Kumar; Arya; Nayanthara; Taapsee
- Cinematography: Om Prakash
- Edited by: A. Sreekar Prasad
- Music by: Yuvan Shankar Raja
- Production company: Sri Sathya Sai Movies
- Distributed by: Ayngaran International
- Release date: 31 October 2013
- Running time: 158 minutes
- Country: India
- Language: Tamil
- Budget: ₹60 crore
- Box office: ₹80–124 crore

Arrambam (transl. Beginning) is a 2013 Indian Tamil-language action thriller film directed by Vishnuvardhan. Produced by A. Raghuram and co-written by Subha, the film stars Ajith Kumar, Arya, Nayanthara, Taapsee and Rana Daggubati (in a cameo), with Mahesh Manjrekar, Aadukalam Naren, Kishore, Atul Kulkarni, Akshara Gowda and Murali Sharma in supporting roles. While the score and soundtrack of the film were composed by Yuvan Shankar Raja, the cinematography was handled by Om Prakash and editing by A. Sreekar Prasad.

Following a six-month long pre-production and the official announcement of the project in May 2012, filming commenced in June 2012 and continued for the next 15 months. Majority of the filming happened in Mumbai. Other locations included Chennai, Bangalore, Dubai, Hyderabad, Mahabaleshwar, Jaisalmer, Leh and Ladakh. The film was not titled until it entered post-production and was mostly referred to as Thala 53 or Valai, a supposed working title. The film was released on 31 October 2013.

== Plot ==
Ashok Kumar "A.K" fixes bombs in three places and informs the cops about them. Before the cops arrive, he sets off the bombs. Ashok and his girlfriend Maya, threaten her old college mate hacker, Arjun, forcing him to hack each system simultaneously. Ashok threatens Sriram Raghavan by trying to kill his child so that he can extract the truth about black money, where he murders Sriram. Arjun gets irritated by the things happening around him and complains about Ashok's misdeeds to Inspector Prakash. When Ashok gets closer to achieving his goals, Arjun gives him away to the cops, and both are arrested. Upon discovering his true identity, the police release Arjun. Later, Maya, who had escaped from the scene, tracks Arjun and his girlfriend Anitha and tells them about Ashok's original motive.

Past: A few months ago, Ashok was a former member of the Anti-Terrorist Squad who was on a mission to expose a scam regarding faulty bulletproof jackets given to the security forces, which resulted in many deaths, including his best friend and colleague ACP Sanjay. It turned out that Home Minister Mahadev Rane and his associates JCP Milind Virekar and Ramya Radhakrishnan were the people involved in the scam. Ramya's goons killed Sanjay's pregnant wife and her parents by poisoning, while Maya, whom they also poisoned, and Mango, whom the goons placed on a railway track, survived the attack. Ashok also gets shot and is pushed from a cliff but survives.

Present: After learning about this, Arjun feels guilty and decides to help them. Ashok, Maya and Arjun arrive in Dubai to meet Mahadev's daughter, Deeksha, where Arjun enters a bank in the guise of a service engineer and opens an account so that Ashok can transfer all of Mahadev's money into his account. Maya kills Ramya by pushing her off a building. Deeksha later finds out about their plan but is later threatened at gunpoint by Ashok. Ashok, Arjun, and Maya later arrive in Mumbai but come to know that Mahadev has kidnapped Anitha. Ashok tactfully kidnaps Deeksha and Durrani in Kashmir. Mahadev arrives in Kashmir with Anitha. Here, Durrani and Deeksha get killed while Arjun saves Anitha.

Ashok kidnaps Mahadev and ties him to various bombs, where he questions his corrupt activities. Prakash arrives and calls Ashok to defuse the bombs. Ashok advises Prakash to think from the point of view of a commoner instead of a policeman to determine whether it is right on his part to save a corrupt person. Prakash changes his mind and asks the other police officers to leave him, so the bomb blasts, killing Mahadev. Arjun and Anitha get married, while Ashok transfers Mahadev's illegal money to the Reserve Bank without revealing his appearance. A couple of guys kidnap Arjun and Anitha in Jordan during their honeymoon trip, only to know that Ashok has brought them for another mission.

== Cast ==
- Ajith Kumar as Ashok Kumar IPS (AK)
- Arya as Arjun
- Nayanthara as Maya
- Taapsee as Anitha
- Mahesh Manjrekar as Mahadev Rane
- Aadukalam Naren as Sriram Raghavan
- Atul Kulkarni as JCP Milind Virekar, a corrupt officer workng for Mahadev
- Suman Ranganathan as Ramya Radhakrishnan
- Kishore as Inspector Prakash
- Krishna as Mango
- Akshara Gowda as Deeksha Rane
- Murli Sharma as Durrani
- Bhawana Aneja as Nandhini
- Karthik as Imran
- Mona Kakade as Prakash's wife
- Rana Daggubati as ACP Sanjay (guest appearance)
- Savi Sidhu as Durrani's comrade (uncredited)

== Production ==
=== Development ===
In September 2011, producer A. M. Rathnam stated that he would produce Ajith Kumar's next film after Billa II, which was touted to begin by December 2011. Vishnuvardhan, whom Ajith had worked with in Billa, was the front-runner to direct the film, although certain media sections also suggested that Rathnam may recruit director Shankar to make a sequel to his 1996 vigilante film Indian. The claims were refuted by a source close to Ajith. In January 2012, Rathnam informed that he had signed Ajith and director Vishnuvardhan for his next film, while the director himself confirmed later that he was "undoubtedly directing Ajith’s next flick". A press release published by A. M. Rathnam in May 2012 officially announced the project and listed the cast and crew members. According to the press release, the film would be produced by A. Raghuram on behalf of Sri Satya Sai Movies, while Rathnam would supervise it.

Subsequently, speculation arose that Vishnuvardhan may remake his own 2011 Telugu action thriller Panjaa, or the Bollywood action flick Race, but the director clarified that he would not remake either film. Writer-duo Subha joined the team and worked on the script and dialogues. According to a "close source from the production house", a remake of Race was planned initially, as there was not much time to write a fresh script, but after Subha's entry into the team, the idea was scrapped and work on an original script began, with the writers telling that they took "nearly three months to come out with the sketch". In an early interview during the scripting phase, Vishnuvardhan opened up about the film that he was planning to work "on a drama, more on family action drama". Upon completion of the film, he made clear that the film was not a gangster film, and labelled it as an "action drama", further adding that it was a "fictional story based on a real incident". Vishnuvardhan also said that work on the story began only after he was signed on to direct a film with Ajith. Ajith continued the "salt and pepper look" from Mankatha, as he would play a "mature guy", and underwent supervised weight-training, working out at the gym for six hours a day. The actor later disclosed that he played a "mean guy ... a politically incorrect character" while adding that the film would have a "strong social message". Vishuvardhan opened up that Ajith would play an officer in the cyber crime department of the country. Closer to the film's release, the director revealed that Ajith would have "two faces in the film".

The film was started without a title and remained untitled for over 15 months, during which it was widely referred to as Thala 53 in the media, denoting Ajith's 53rd film. A teaser trailer released in May 2013 on YouTube did not feature a title either. The makers had tossed with the idea of naming the film Thala, Ajith's nickname, which was refused by the actor, while Vishnuvardhan also requested fans to suggest a suitable title. Several false titles including Surangani, and Paravai went around in the media, and in January 2013 "A source in the know" stated that the title was Valai, after one of the writers, Suresh, had tweeted that the title begins with a 'V'. Although not officially confirmed, the film was henceforth referred to as Valai by the media. At Anna University's Gateway 2013 Short Film Festival by the Department of Media Sciences in April 2013, Vishnuvardhan revealed that the film was not titled Valai, adding that two titles were under consideration. On 24 July 2013, Arrambam was unveiled as the film's official title. The dubbed Telugu version was titled Aata Arambham.

=== Casting ===
Vishnuvardhan told that he was looking for an actress who could speak Tamil properly to be cast for the lead female role, with Anushka Shetty and Amala Paul being among the considered candidates. Kajal Aggarwal was also reportedly approached for the lead heroine. Although he wanted a "fresh pairing for Ajith", the director eventually selected Nayanthara, who had earlier worked with both Ajith and Vishnuvardhan in Billa. Several media sections carried reports that Vishnuvardhan's brother Kreshna would be signed for a parallel role in the film, but the role went to Arya, who had been part of four Vishnuvardhan directorials. Several sources claimed that Arya may play an antagonistic role, which Vishnuvardhan did not comment on but he informed that Arya's role in the film was that of a hacker.

Richa Gangopadhyay was supposed to play the second female lead, but was replaced with Taapsee Pannu, who stated that she played a journalist, a "very lively character, who is always on the go". It was then reported that Arvind Swamy and Prithviraj Sukumaran would play pivotal roles, and that Telugu actors Nagarjuna, Ravi Teja and Jagapathi Babu would have cameo appearances in the film; however none of the actors had any roles in the film. By late May, Hindi actor Mahesh Manjrekar was finalised for the role of a villain in the film, stating that he would be shooting for it from August onwards. The next month, Suman Ranganathan was cast for the role of Ramya, a "hard-nosed reporter", making a comeback to Tamil cinema after 17 years. Telugu actor Rana Daggubati was signed to do a "special appearance" in the film, and took part in the shooting in Mumbai; he completed his part in June 2013. It was reported that the 2008 Mumbai attacks would be part of the storyline, which would feature Rana's portion. Kishore joined the cast in July 2012 to enact an Anti-terrorist squad member, claimed to be a prominent role in the film. Akshara Gowda stated that she was also part of the film, while Prashant Nair informed that he had a small role in Valai.

Vishnuvardhan's norm composer Yuvan Shankar Raja was recruited to compose the film score. Stephen Richter who was one of the stunt coordinators in Ajith's Billa II was hired to choreograph stunts in this film, too. Besides Richter, Lee Whittaker, who has worked in Hollywood films, and Kecha designed several stunts sequences. Sunil Babu was initially called in as the art director but opted out later, with Ilaiyaraja taking his place. Vishnuvardhan's wife Anu Vardhan, who had worked on all of her husband's film, was in charge of costume designing in this film as well. Nirav Shah was approached to work as the cinematographer, but as he was busy with other commitments, P. S. Vinod, who filmed Vishnuvardhan's previous film, Panjaa, was recruited. Vinod was later replaced by Om Prakash.

=== Filming ===
Principal photography of the film was to begin on Chennai on 31 May 2012, but started with a slight delay on 2 June 2012 with portions involving Nayanthara and Arya, while Ajith joined them a day later. The filming was expected to proceed until the end of the month in Mumbai, but was later cancelled due to monsoon and the location was shifted to Bangalore. and later in Hyderabad. On 7 September, during the second schedule, Taapsee Pannu joined the crew and began shooting her portions. For a fight scene, which was shot between 8 pm and 8 am the next day, Ajith spent several hours hanging upside down. During the next schedule that started on 2 November 2012, filming was held in Mumbai and its suburban locations. While shooting an action sequence, Ajith injured his leg while jumping from one car to another, suffering a ligament tear. Despite his injuries, Ajith continued shooting. Vishnuvardhan later revealed that it was Arya who drove the car when Ajith hurt his legs during the stunt scene. In late December a short shooting schedule was held in Chennai, during which a fight sequence featuring Ajith and Arya was shot.

The team returned to Mumbai a third time for a 15-day schedule on 1 January 2013, with scenes involving Arya, Nayanthara and Taapsee being filmed in the Bandra area of Mumbai in the first week and Ajith's part in the latter part of the schedule. The crew left for Dubai on 11 February 2013, where Ajith filmed a boat sequence for the film, which was choreographed by Hollywood stuntman Lee Whittaker. After finishing the boat scene, he tweeted, "Finished amazing boat sequence here in Dubai! Ajith was absolutely amazing! Couldn't have done it without his skills!" Stills of Ajith riding a Ducati Diavel in Dubai also circulated in the Internet. In March 2013, Ajith, Arya and Nayanthara shot a holi song featuring both Tamil and Hindi lyrics at a studio in Mumbai, which was choreographed by Dinesh. The crew will be shooting the last schedule in Jaisalmer in Rajasthan from 1 May onwards, after which the unit was reported to be moving to Orissa, where a song and a few scenes were to be shot. It was followed by filming in Madhya Pradesh, Mahabaleshwar, Maharashtra. The climax scenes were filmed by mid-May in Kullu Manali in Himachal Pradesh. The schedules were finished in July 2013, following which patch work remained. On 20 August 2013, another schedule was started in Chennai. The entire filming was completed in early October 2013 with the last day shoot held in a Mumbai mall featuring Ajith and Arya.

Cinematographer Om Prakash stated that he wanted to give the visuals a "green tint because the colour 'green' is commonly associated with prosperity and knowledge". He also added that some scenes featuring Ajith were intendedly shot so that the audience would see both him and his reflection and that hand-held cameras were used to shoot those scenes from close "not because it would look fancy, but the script demanded such an approach". He described the speed boat stunt where Ajith performed a 180-degree turn at high speed as risky and "scary" as he filmed the entire scene seated at the front of the boat.

Post-production works on the film started by mid 2013, and were carried out simultaneously with the shoot. Rekhs worked on the subtitles of the film. By September 2013, the actors were dubbing for their roles in Mumbai. In October 2013, Yuvan Shankar Raja was working on the re-recording, while digital intermediate works were in the "final stages".

== Music ==
Yuvan Shankar Raja was signed on to compose the film's soundtrack and score, continuing his association with Vishnuvardhan and Ajith Kumar. The soundtrack album consists of five tracks; notably a theme music track was not included, which was composed only later during the re-recording. Pa. Vijay penned the lyrics for all songs. It was released directly to stores on 19 September 2013 and opened at number one on iTunes India after its release at midnight, which, according to Sify, "no Tamil album has done before". It also received positive reviews from critics.

== Release ==
The satellite rights of the film were sold to Jaya TV. In early September 2013, producer A. M. Ratnam officially announced that the film would release for the Diwali festival. It was advanced by two days as the makers wanted the film to release on a Thursday. On 18 October 2013, the film was given a "U" (Universal) certificate by the Central Board of Film Certification, the first Ajith film since Kireedam (2007) to do so. The British Board of Film Classification issued an uncut 15 certificate with an advice that it "contains strong threat and violence". At the request of the distributor, cuts of five minutes length were made, obtaining a 12A certificate for the cut version.

The theatrical rights for the film in Coimbatore, Tirupur, Ooty and Erode areas were purchased by Cosmo Pictures' Siva for ₹69 million, while the rights for Madurai-Ramnad area were sold to Alagar for an undisclosed amount. Ayngaran International bought the rights of the NSC (North Arcot-South Arcot–Chengalpet) area from the producer. Director and distributor Rama Narayanan purchased the Chengalpet area. The Kerala theatrical rights of were sold for ₹14.5 million to Sree Kaleeshwary, while the Karnataka theatrical rights of were purchased by Sri Lakshmi Swami Enterprise for over ₹30 million. The US distribution were acquired by GK Media, which planned to release the film in 78 locations in the USA.

=== Controversies ===
By mid-October 2013, a petition was filed in the Madras High Court by B. Rajeswari alleging that Arrambam producer A. M. Rathnam had not returned money borrowed from the financier and remanding the film's release to be stalled until the dues were met. Rathnam however clarified that the film was not produced by him but by A Raghuram's Sri Sathya Sai Movies. A day prior to the planned release, film producer K. Kannan filed a suit in the City Civil Court seeking to restrain the film from releasing as he had already commenced the production of a film with a similar title, Ini Dhan Arambam that had been registered with Film and Television Producers Guild of South of India.

== Reception ==
Arrambam opened to positive reviews from critics. Sify said, "'Arrambam' lives up to the expectations and is a satisfying thrill ride for its variety in providing no-holds barred entertainment. Ajith' terrific screen presence and powerful dialogue delivery, smart writing, charismatic cast and action which is fast-paced are smartly packaged by director Vishnuvardhan." About the performances, the critic said, "Ajith himself gives a low-key, well-nuanced performance as Ashok, the conscience of this film; Arya is superb as the happy-go-lucky Arjun and his comedy scene in college with Nayan is a rocker." Indiaglitz commented, "Simple, elegant and class but richly crafted to keep you tuned to the screen – 'Arrambam' is an interesting story in a gripping screenplay." Talking about the technical aspects, the website says, "Om Prakash has canned every frame with passion. Cohesion and continuity is edgy and distinctly better only as the film progresses. Srikar Prasad has however done a commendable job in putting the pieces of action together in thorough entertainment. Background score adds volume to the story, supporting it substantially well."

Baradwaj Rangan of The Hindu wrote, "Arrambam is a feet-hands-face movie — the kind of hero-centric film made for fans. Vishnuvardhan manages a reasonable balance. Fans are likely to be delighted with a narrative that pumps up their hero’s strengths (coolness; good comebacks, including a terrific punch line about fingerprints) and downplays his failings (dramatics)". M. Suganth of The Times of India rated it 3 stars out of 5 and wrote, "Arrambam is a very familiar tale of corruption, betrayal and revenge, served up with a dash of style. Vishnuvardhan has taken a leaf out of a real-life incident and with the help of his co-writers SuBa, has spun an action thriller that, for the most parts, keeps moving at a fast clip". The New Indian Express wrote, "Slick and stylish like their earlier venture, the film, despite its glitches, manages to keep one entertained for the most part. Ajith’s charismatic screen presence is the mainstay of the film". IANS wrote, "Arrambam is undoubtedly highly stylish, but otherwise it's just another clichéd revenge drama. Arrambam is not bad but the problem with it is that it lacks creative touch" and noted the film for its similarities to the film Swordfish. But the reviewer praises Ajith's acting: "This is the third time in a row Ajith has played the anti-hero with elan. He is unarguably one of the more stylish actors in the industry and he has proved it time and again". Deccan Chronicle wrote, "The film will not disappoint the average viewer despite not living up to the hype and hoopla".

S. Saraswathi of Rediff rated it 3 stars out of 5 and wrote, "Arrambam is a stylish and fast-paced action thriller set in the backdrop of the 26/11 Mumbai serial bomb blasts, that is unfortunately let down by its uninspired and mediocre storyline". Bangalore Mirror wrote, "From the start to the end, Aarambam is an out-and-out Ajith film — a perfect Diwali gift for Thala's fans across the world. Aarambam is far from perfect, but it works mostly because of Ajith's mannerisms though it doesn't come anywhere near Mankatha or Billa". Eddie Harrison of The List rated it 2/5 and called it a "derivative but splashy and colourful action-fest that makes the most of a charismatic star-turn from Kumar. What’s missing is any real sensitivity to the material; Vishnuvardhan stages his set pieces with style, but the uneasy mixture of genre styles places Arrambam firmly in the file marked disposable entertainment".

== Box office ==
According to trade analyst Trinath, Arrambam collected approximately ₹92.1 million nett on the opening day in Tamil Nadu, which was the best opening for an Ajith film. According to Behindwoods, the film grossed ₹43.9 million at the Chennai box office alone over the first week.

In the US, the film earned US$330,615 (₹2.04 crore) from 73 reported screens in its opening weekend. As of 9 November 2013, it has grossed $369,150, approximately ₹2.3 crore and became the fifth highest grossing Tamil film and highest grossing Ajith film in the US. In the UK, the opening weekend gross was £135,213 (₹13.4 million) from 37 screens, inclusive of the preview shows of £34,830 previews on Wednesday evening. After the second weekend, the film had earned £176,282 at the UK box office overall. In Australia, the film earned an opening-weekend total of A$55,953 (₹33 lakh) from 7 screens. In Malaysia, Arrambam opened at the second spot as it grossed $788,469 (around ₹85 million) in its opening weekend (31 October to 3 November), from 80 screens. After the second weekend, the total collection was $1,359,407.

=== Awards and nominations ===
Date of ceremony	Award	Category	Recipient(s) and nominee(s)	Result	Ref.
16 February 2014	Edison Awards	Enthusiastic Female Performer	Taapsee Pannu	Won	
5 July 2014	Vijay Awards	Favourite Film	Arrambam	Won	
5 July 2014	Vijay Awards	Favourite Director	Vishnuvardhan	Nominated	
5 July 2014	Vijay Awards	Favourite Hero	Ajith Kumar	Nominated	
12 July 2014	Filmfare Awards South	Best Actor – Tamil	Ajith Kumar	Nominated	
12 July 2014	Filmfare Awards South	Best Supporting Actor – Tamil	Arya	Nominated	
12 July 2014	Filmfare Awards South	Best Supporting Actress – Tamil	Taapsee Pannu	Nominated	
12 & 13 September 2014	South Indian International Movie Awards	Best Director – Tamil	Vishnuvardhan	Nominated	
12 & 13 September 2014	South Indian International Movie Awards	Best Actor in a Supporting Role – Tamil	Arya	Won	
12 & 13 September 2014	South Indian International Movie Awards	Best Actress in a Supporting Role – Tamil	Taapsee Pannu	Nominated	
12 & 13 September 2014	South Indian International Movie Awards	Best Fight Choreographer – Tamil	Lee Whittaker	Nominated	
12 & 13 September 2014	South Indian International Movie Awards	Best Dance Choreographer – Tamil	Shobhi ("En Fuse Pochu")	Won	
