= Billa (2007 film) =

2007 Indian Tamil-language action thriller film by Vishnuvardhan

- Theatrical release poster
- Directed by: Vishnuvardhan
- Screenplay by: Vishnuvardhan
- Story by: Salim–Javed
- Based on: Don (Hindi)
- Produced by: L. Suresh
- Starring: Ajith Kumar; Prabhu; Rahman; Nayanthara; Namitha
- Cinematography: Nirav Shah
- Edited by: A. Sreekar Prasad
- Music by: Yuvan Shankar Raja
- Production companies: Ananda Picture Circuit; Nigel Wick Zepher Studio
- Distributed by: Pyramid Saimira; Ayngaran International
- Release date: 14 December 2007
- Running time: 140 minutes
- Country: India
- Language: Tamil

Billa is a 2007 Indian Tamil-language action thriller film directed by Vishnuvardhan. It is a remake of the 1980 film of the same name starring Rajnikanth, which itself is a remake of 1978 Hindi film Don, starring Amitabh Bachchan. The film stars Ajith Kumar who plays a double role as an underworld don and his friendly look-alike alongside Nayanthara and Namitha, while Prabhu, Rahman, Adithya Menon, and Santhanam play supporting roles. It is produced by L. Suresh and Abdurrahman M while featuring a score and soundtrack by Yuvan Shankar Raja, cinematography by Nirav Shah and editing by A. Sreekar Prasad.

The shooting of Billa commenced in April 2007 and was released and distributed worldwide by Ayngaran International on 14 December 2007. The film, upon release, emerged highly successful and completed 175 day run at theatres. and was selected to be screened at the 61st Cannes Film Festival. A prequel, Billa II was released on July 13, 2012.

== Plot ==
David Billa is an underworld Don who is the most wanted on Interpol's list, hiding and operating out of Malaysia. DSP Jayaprakash has spent the last few years looking for Billa, leaving behind a life in India. During a chase with the police, Billa is severely wounded after an accident. He somehow manages to get into Jayaprakash's car, and Jayaprakash accidentally kills him, who secretly holds a burial for Billa. Interpol officer Gokulnath is assigned to work with Jayaprakash to capture elusive Billa, as no one knows of Billa's death. Jayaprakash keeps Billa's death a secret even from his fellow officers, and tracks down a look-alike called Saravana Velu, a hotel server and small-time petty gangster. He asks Velu to infiltrate Billa's gang by pretending to be Billa. In return, he will ensure that the child Velu adopted, Karan, receives a proper education.

Jayaprakash trains Velu and sends him back to Billa's gang, disguised as an amnesiac Billa, who had been hiding at an apartment complex due to his injuries. Slowly, Velu starts to learn about Billa's gang and even speaks to Jagdish, Billa's boss, on the phone. Velu provides a pen drive with the secret information of the crime network to Jayaprakash. Still, he is about to be killed by Sasha because her brother Rajesh, as well as his fiancée Rhea, was killed by Billa earlier. At this juncture, Jayaprakash arrives and tells her that he is Velu, not Billa. Later, before a party, Velu secretly informs Jayaprakash about a meeting of Billa's network, and C.J., Billa's girlfriend, overhears his conversation. She confronts Velu, but in the struggle, he accidentally kills her.

A shootout occurs at the party, and Jayaprakash is killed by an unknown assailant, leaving his gun behind. Velu finds Jayaprakash dead and the weapon, but is taken into the custody of the police team, now headed by Gokulnath. During interrogation, he tells Gokulnath that he is Velu, not Billa. Velu mentions a piece of evidence – the pen drive, which may prove his innocence, but the pen drive is nowhere to be found. Unable to prove his innocence, Velu escapes from a police van and phones Gokulnath, where he asks him to meet at the Aero bridge, where it is revealed that Gokulnath is none other than Jagadish and was the one who killed Jayaprakash. Officer Anil Menon apparently had the pen drive all along and struck a deal with Velu to get hold of Jagdish.

Meanwhile, Sasha and Karan have been kidnapped by Jagadish, who is demanding the pen drive in return. Velu meets Ranjith and gives him a second pen drive with the same data, but it's corrupted. When Ranjith tries to kill Velu, a scuffle ensues, making Ranjith fall from the top. In a final confrontation, Jagadish fights with Velu. Jagadish, posing as Gokulnath, asks the police to arrest Velu as Billa, but gets shot by the squad of police and dies as the police have wired the entire conversation between Jagadish and Velu, thus proving his innocence. Velu finally hands over the original pen drive to Officer Menon and joins Sasha and Karan.

== Cast ==
- Ajith Kumar in a double role as:
  - David Billa / Ranga "Rangayya", a dreaded gangster and a powerful don
  - Saravana Velu, a hotel server and small-time petty gangster
- Prabhu as DSP Jayaprakash
- Rahman as Jagadish / Gokulnath (fake)
- Nayanthara as Sasha, Velu's love interest (Voice Dubbed By Savitha J)
- Namitha as C. J., Billa's love interest
- Santhanam as Krishna
- Adithya Menon as Anil Menon
- John Vijay as John
- Yog Japee as Ranjith
- Master Avnish as Karan
- T. Balasubramaniam as Rajesh
- Hazel Keech as Rhea, Rajesh's fiancé
- Vidhyasakar as Sakar
- Tharany as Karany

== Production ==
=== Development ===
In an interview, Vishnuvardhan said that he had "twice missed out on the chance to direct [Ajith]. The third time when I got a chance to direct him, I made sure that I would not miss it. I was all ready to write a good script for him, but he said, he wanted me to remake Billa", confirming it was Ajith's idea.

After the official announcement of the production company, the director and the cameraman, Vishnuvardhan and Nirav Shah began to select other members of the cast and the crew to be a part of the Billa team. Ajith could not assist in helping choose the other members. On 13 April 2007, the eve of Tamil New Year's Day, the launch of Billa took place at the AVM studios in Vadapalani, Chennai. Among the attendees were the stars of the old cast, Rajinikanth, Sripriya, Suresh Balaji as well as noted directors Mani Ratnam, Dharani, K. S. Ravikumar, and Saran. The confirmed cast until the date of the launch also were invited, among them Ajith along with his wife, Shalini, Nayanthara, Namitha, Thivya I. and Prabhu.

=== Filming ===
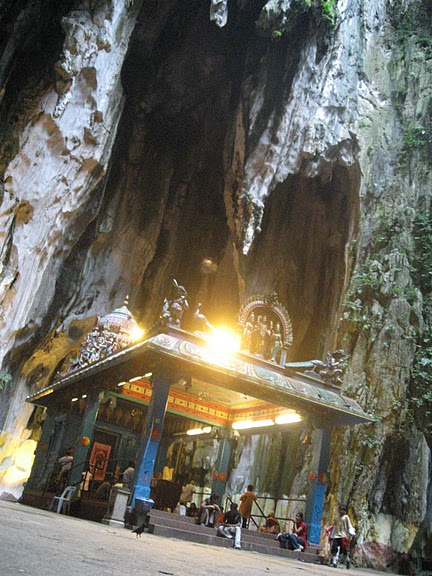
The song "Sevalkodi" was shot at Murugan Temple, Batu Caves, Kuala Lumpur, Malaysia.

Apart from the casting of Ajith in the dual lead role, previously played by Rajinikanth, the rest of the cast took nearly four months to finalise. The role played by Sripriya in the original was given to Nayantara in early 2007, controversially after Bollywood actress, Isha Sharvani, who had been in contention to act in the last few movies of Ajith, was paid the advance. Vishnuvardhan reported that he was pleased with Nayanthara's role in E and subsequently opted for her. The other lead role in the film was initially written for Shriya Saran, but due to her contract with Sivaji: The Boss, she refused to accept the film. Despite other actresses such as Trisha, Reema Sen, Asin and Bhanu being considered, the role was eventually given to Pooja Umashankar. However, she refused the role, citing that she was reluctant to appear in a bikini, as the role required. Nayanthara was later finalized as the female lead.

The remaining members of the cast were selected after the launch, which was held on 13 April 2007. Despite early reports of Prakash Raj playing the role enacted by K. Balaji of an inspector in the original, the role was eventually secured by Prabhu. The role of the comedian was tipped to go Vadivelu, after he received rave reviews for his comic chemistry in Chandramukhi with Rajinikanth. However, despite the reviews, Vishnuvardhan's regular pattern meant that the spotlight for a comedian would be limited. Santhanam replaced him. Another character artiste, Adithya, also signed up to be one of the members of the police troupe, as did Malayalam actor Rahman, who with Billa made his comeback into Tamil cinema. The item number danced by Helen in the original was originally given to Mumaith Khan, but was later changed to newcomer Rose Dawn, for unknown reasons.

For his crew, Vishnuvardhan picked his preferred technicians, with Rajkannan as the dialogue writer, Nirav Shah as the cinematographer, William Ong as the stunt master, Thota Tharani as the art director, Pa. Vijay as the chief lyricist and A. Sreekar Prasad as the editor. Vishnuvardhan's orthodox music composer, Yuvan Shankar Raja, was chosen, creating great expectations for the project, while Vishnuvardhan's wife, Anu Vardhan, worked as a costume designer. Majority of the film was shot in Malaysia at locations including Langkawi, Kuala Lumpur overlooking the Petronas Towers and other parts, while a few scenes were shot at the Binny Mills in Chennai.

== Soundtrack ==
For the film's music and soundtrack, Vishnuvardhan renewed his previous association (Kurumbu, Arinthum Ariyamalum and Pattiyal) with Yuvan Shankar Raja. The soundtrack has six songs, and the lyrics were penned by Pa. Vijay. Since the film was a remake, two songs from the original soundtrack, composed by M. S. Viswanathan, were remixed and included in the soundtrack. The formal release of the soundtrack was held on 21 November 2007 at Hotel Residence Towers in Chennai. Yuvan Shankar Raja reused some of the background music of his previous ventures Kedi and Vallavan in Billa. The album achieved record audio sales.

== Home media ==
The satellite rights of the film were bought by Kalaignar TV. Its television premiere occurred on the occasion of Diwali on 27 October 2008.

== Reception ==
=== Box office ===
The film was released in over 200 screens in Tamil Nadu and 50 screens overseas. The film was made on a budget of ₹15 crore (worth ₹61 crore in 2021 prices) and sold to Ayngaran International for ₹25 crore. In Chennai alone it collected ₹5.2 crore. The film completed a 175-day run at theatres and was declared a blockbuster. Billa became the second highest-grossing film for the year 2007. It was the highest grosser of Ajith Kumar until the release of Mankatha (2011).

=== Critical response ===
Billa opened to primarily positive critical response. Sify lauded the film, writing: Billa delivers the goods with its great star cast, a designer look, technical glitz, perfect chemistry making it an entertainment extravaganza". The reviewer claimed that it was the "first designer-look Kollywood film with classy action cuts" and a "technically chic, racy, engrossing entertainer with a Hollywood look", going on to call it "racy & rocking". The critic also heaped praise on the lead actor: "Ajith looks sensational and clearly he is at home, playing dual roles of Billa and Velu. He is suave, dashing, and debonair and has a terrific screen presence which makes the film work big time. You just cannot think of any other actor in Tamil donning the role made memorable by Rajinikanth". Revathi of Kalki praised the star cast, cinematography, Yuvan's background score but felt dialogues were inaudible and the film struggles after the suspense around Jagadish is revealed and humorous portions were weak nevertheless Vishnuvardhan should be praised for making Billa on par with Hollywood films. Chennai Online wrote "It's clearly a film targeted at today's generation. Contemporary, stylish and sleek, it could compete with the standard of any international action flick. After the promise he had revealed in 'Arinthum Ariyamalum' and 'Pattiyal', Vishnu Vardhan proves yet again, that he is a maker to watch out for. 'Billa' couldn't have been remade any better today than what Vishnu has done. It's worth a watch." Malathi Rangarajan of The Hindu wrote "Though it lives up to the pre-release hype about its chic factor and has a handsome hero to boot, this remake extravaganza isn’t at its appealing best mainly because it is faithful to the Tamil original to a fault. Yet you have to give it to Vishnu — flamboyance spells class in Ajith’s ‘Billa.’".

In contrast, TSV Hari from Rediff wrote that the film "disappoints" and gave it 2.5 out of 5, further claiming: "Director Vishnuvardhan seems to have been in a dilemma as to whether to focus on Ajith or give the film well-etched characters. There are too many diversions in the form of female cleavages in the rain forests of Malaysia and garish sets". Balaji, who produced and portrayed the DSP in the 1980 film, praised the 2007 film for being "very stylish and looking grand", but expressed his dismay over the absence of the characters previously played by Thengai Srinivasan, S. A. Ashokan and Manorama.

== Prequel ==
In 2008, reports claimed that, following the film's commercial success, Soundarya Rajinikanth was planning to make a sequel, to be produced by Ocher Studios in association with Warner Bros. However, the sequel did not materialise, and the idea was dropped, with Ajith Kumar, Vishnuvardhan and Soundarya getting busy with other projects.

In mid-2010, sources confirmed that Vishnuvardhan had finished penning the script for a prequel and that Ajith Kumar would reprise the titular character. The project became officially announced in late 2010, after Ajith Kumar signed up and first production poster were published to the media. Suresh Balaje, son of producer and actor K. Balaje, who produced the original Billa with Rajinikanth, and George Pius from Wide Angle Creations banner, were confirmed as the producer, who associated with Mumbai-based IN Entertainment Limited, a Hinduja group company. However, in a turn of events, Vishnuvardhan was replaced by Chakri Toleti, and a new script was written by Toleti and his assistants. The prequel was released at 13 July 2012 to positive reviews, eventually becoming as a box office success.

== Bibliography ==
- Dhananjayan, G. (2014). Pride of Tamil Cinema: 1931 to 2013. Blue Ocean Publishers.
