= Nirav Shah =

Indian cinematographer (born 1974)

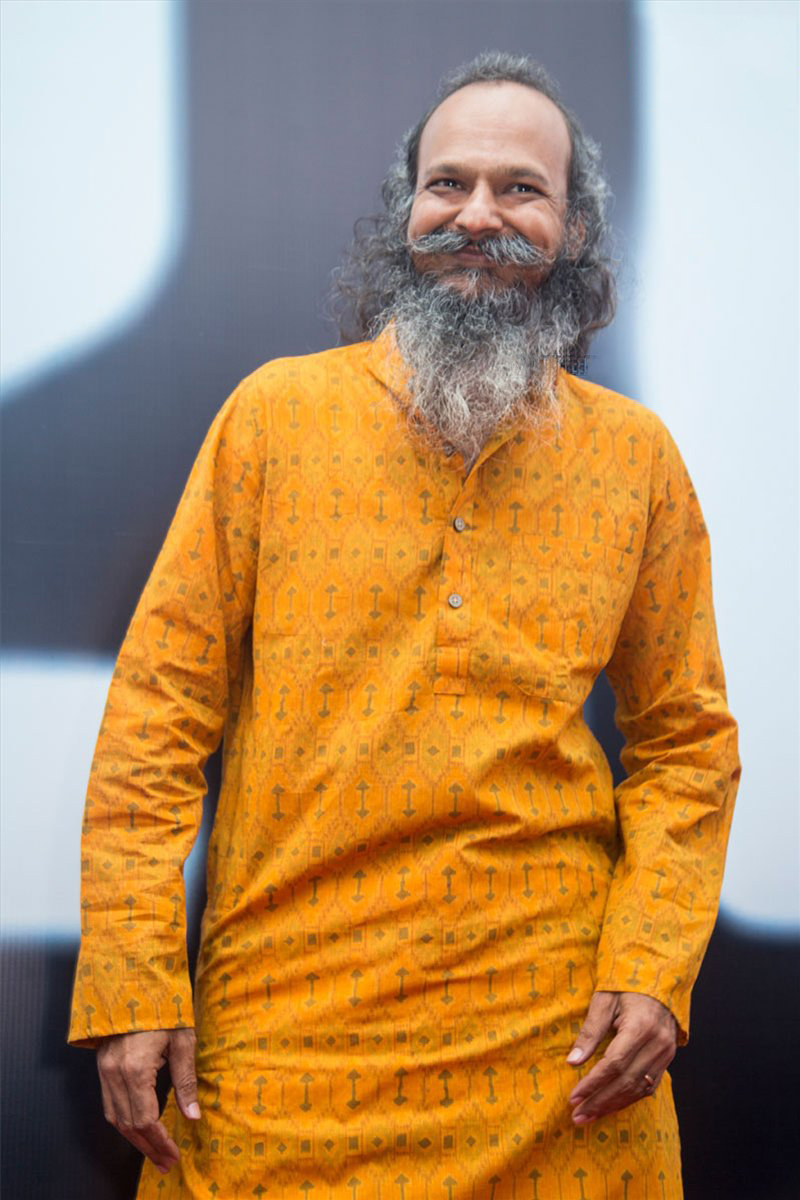
- Born: 16 November 1974 (age 51); Madras, Tamil Nadu, India
- Occupations: Cinematographer, entrepreneur

Nirav Shah (born 16 November 1974) is an Indian cinematographer. He has worked on a number of major box office hits in Tamil, Hindi and Malayalam since his debut with the 2004 Hindi film Paisa Vasool.

== Career ==
After having worked as an assistant to other noted cinematographers and solely on many television advertisements, music videos and short films, Nirav Shah became an independent cinematographer with the 2004 Hindi film Paisa Vasool, following which, he worked on another Hindi film Inteqam: The Perfect Game (2004). It was, however, the blockbuster Dhoom (2004) that made people take notice of Shah, winning him accolades and gaining him fame and popularity.

Subsequently, Shah got offers from the Tamil film industry as well and moved southwards, debuting in Kollywood with the 2005 Linguswamy-directed action film Sandakozhi, following which he was called up by director Vishnuvardhan. They first teamed up for the 2005 Tamil gangster film Pattiyal, following which Vishnuvardhan worked together with Shah for all his following feature films, creating, along with noted music composer, Yuvan Shankar Raja, one of the most acclaimed and most successful collaborations in the Tamil film industry. Shah's works in Vishnuvardhan's films including Arinthum Ariyamalum (2005), Billa (2007) and the most recent Sarvam (2008) got high praise and much critical acclaim, turning him into one of the most sought-after young cinematographers in Kollywood.

He returned to Bollywood to work on the films Banaras and the sequel of Dhoom (both 2006), for which Shah again won accolades and also received several awards and nominations, particular for the latter one. He was signed up by Prabhu Deva for the Vijay-starrer Pokkiri (2007) and by the director-duo Pushkar-Gayathri for their debut venture Oram Po (2007). In 2008 then, Nirav Shah was called by noted filmmaker Shankar to handle the camera for his forthcoming magnum opus science-fiction film Enthiran, but Shah had to reject the invitation because he had already given his word to his friend Vishnuvardhan's Sarvam. He went on to work on the Hindi remake of Pokkiri, Wanted, directed again by Prabhu Deva and A. L. Vijay's Madrasapattinam.

In July 2009, it was announced that Shah would soon turn film director, directing a film under actor Arya's production, starring Arya's brother Sathya in the lead role. Besides, Shah is currently developing and building India's biggest film studio, located at the Old Mahabalipuram Road off Chennai, Tamil Nadu, India, which is said to cost around Rs. 100 crore.

Three of his films have been nominated at the National Award for the Best Cinematographer: Banaras (Hindi), Pattiyal (Tamil) and Dhoom 2 (Hindi). He won the Tamil Nadu Government's State Award for Best Cinematographer for Billa (Tamil).

== Filmography ==
Year	Film	Language	Notes
2004	Paisa Vasool	Hindi	
2004	Dhoom	Hindi	
2004	Intequam	Hindi	
2005	Sandakozhi	Tamil	
2005	Arinthum Ariyamalum	Tamil	
2006	Pattiyal	Tamil	
2006	Banaras	Hindi	
2006	Dhoom 2	Hindi	
2007	Pokkiri	Tamil	
2007	Kireedam	Tamil	
2007	Oram Po	Tamil	
2007	Billa	Tamil	
2009	Sarvam	Tamil	
2009	Wanted	Hindi	
2010	Tamizh Padam	Tamil	
2010	Madrasapattinam	Tamil	
2010	Va	Tamil	
2011	Vaanam	Tamil	
2011	Engeyum Kaadhal	Tamil	
2011	Deiva Thirumagal	Tamil	
2012	Vettai	Tamil	
2012	Kadhalil Sodhapuvadu Yeppadi	Tamil	
2012	Thaandavam	Tamil	
2013	Thalaivaa	Tamil	
2014	Saivam	Tamil	
2014	Kaaviya Thalaivan	Tamil	
2015	Idhu Enna Maayam	Tamil	
2015	Gabbar is Back	Hindi	
2015	Vasuvum Saravananum Onna Padichavanga	Tamil	
2015	Size Zero; Inji Iduppazhagi	Telugu; Tamil	
2018	Diya; Kanam	Telugu; Tamil	
2018	Lakshmi	Tamil	Also story writer
2018	2.0	Tamil	
2018	Kayamkulam Kochunni	Malayalam	
2019	Super Deluxe	Tamil	
2019	Watchman	Tamil	
2019	Nerkonda Paarvai	Tamil	
2019	Namma Veettu Pillai	Tamil	
2020	Tenet	English	Additional camera operator for Mumbai sequences
2022	Valimai	Tamil	
2022	Godfather	Telugu	
2023	Thunivu	Tamil	
2023	Modern Love Chennai	Tamil	Only for 3 episodes
2023	Miss Shetty Mr Polishetty	Telugu	
2024	Ayalaan	Tamil	
2025	Vidaamuyarchi	Tamil	Uncredited
2026	My Lord	Tamil	
2026	Love Insurance Kompany	Tamil	Additional cinematographer
2026	Ranabaali	Telugu	

== Accolades ==
=== Winner ===
- Bollywood Movie Best Cinematography Award – Dhoom 2 (shared with Vikas Sivaraman) (2007)
- Tamil Nadu State Film Award for Best Cinematographer – Billa (2007)
- Cinema Rasigargal Sangam Best Cinematographer Award – Billa (2007)
- Isaiyaruvi Sunfeast Tamil Music Award for Best Cinematography – Billa (2007)
- Tamil Nadu State Film Award for Best Cinematographer – Kaaviya Thalaivan (2014)
- Ananda Vikatan Cinema Awards– Best Cinematography - Super Deluxe

=== Nomination ===
- Star Screen Award for Best Cinematography – Dhoom (2004)

Vijay Awards

- 2011 – Madrasapattinam – Best Cinematography
- 2012 – Deiva Thirumagal – Best Cinematography

South Indian International Movie Awards

- 2019- 2.0 – Best Cinematography
