= Inteqam: The Perfect Game =

- Directed by: Pankaj Parashar
- Written by: Rajiv Babbar; Shah Nawaz Ahmed; Yunus Sajawal; Jalees Sherwani
- Produced by: Rahim Khan
- Starring: Manoj Bajpayee; Isha Koppikar; Nethra Raghuraman; Sushmita Mukherjee; Sharat Saxena
- Cinematography: Nirav Shah
- Edited by: Afaque Husain
- Music by: Anand–Milind
- Production companies: Sahara One Motion Pictures; Mazaa Films
- Release date: October 29, 2004
- Running time: 127 minutes
- Country: India
- Language: Hindi

Inteqam: The Perfect Game is a 2004 Indian Hindi-language action-thriller film directed by Pankuj Parashar, starring Manoj Bajpayee, Isha Koppikar, Nethra Raghuraman, Sushmita Mukherjee, and Sharat Saxena. The film was released on 29 October 2004.

== Cast ==
- Manoj Bajpayee as ACP Uday Dhirendra Thakur
- Isha Koppikar as Avantika Suryavanshi / Pinky Khanna
- Nethra Raghuraman as Dr. Mehak
- Sushmita Mukherjee as Mrs. Lobo
- Parmita Katkur as Urvashi
- Sharat Saxena as Inspector Pandey
- Satyajit Sharma as Parmar
- Amit Sarin as Aditya
- Sanjay Swaraj as Mr. Baliya
- Ramakant Dayma as Mr. Bakul
- Shahab Khan as DCP Gupta

== Soundtrack ==
All lyrics were written by Jalees Sherwani and Rashid Khan; the music was composed by Anand–Milind.

Inteqam: The Perfect Game

Soundtrack album by Anand-Milind
- Released: October 18, 2004
- Genre: Feature film soundtrack
- Language: Hindi
- Label: Times Music

1. "Aaye Ayee Holi" - Udit Narayan, Sowmya Raoh
2. "Ab Waqt Ki Aahat" - Sowmya Rao
3. "Armaan Dil Ke" - Sapna Mukherjee
4. "Ishq Sarfira" - KK, Sandhana Sargam
5. "Chanak Chanak" - Poornima Shrestha
6. "Tan Se Jo Chunari" - Richa Sharma

== Reception ==
Taran Adarsh of Bollywood Hungama gave the film 1/5 stars, writing "In a Nutshell, INTEQAM - THE PERFECT GAME, Parashar's latest offering, emerges as an inferior clone!.
