= Rabbit Mac =

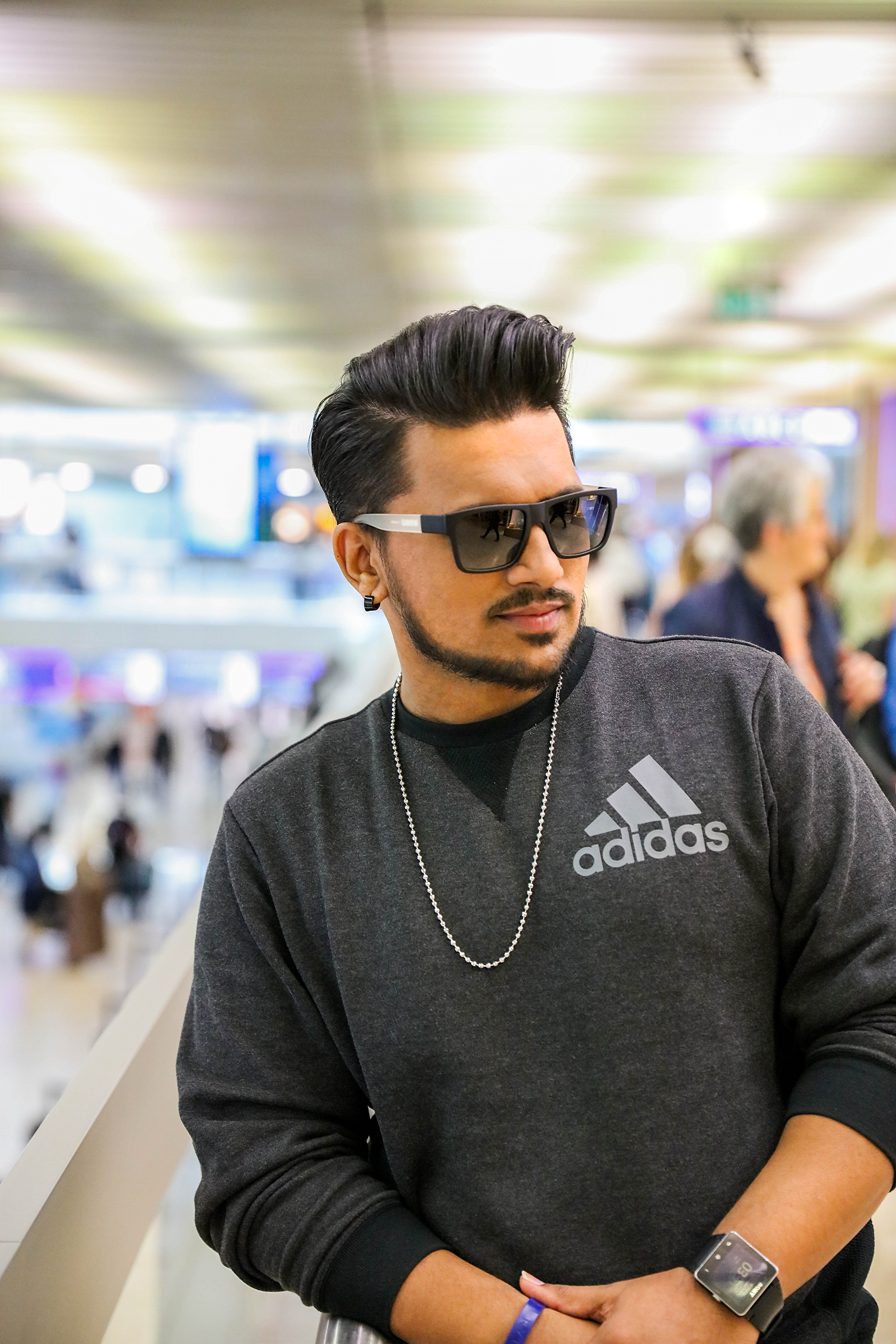

Background information
- Also known as: Rabbit Mac
- Born: Charles John Macallum; August 7, 1983 (age 43); Georgetown, Penang, Malaysia
- Genres: Hip hop, R&B
- Occupations: chef; singer; songwriter; record producer; actor
- Instruments: Vocals
- Years active: 2001-present
- Label: PSYCHO.unit
- Website: pu4lyf.com

Charles John Macallum, known as Rabbit Mac, is an Indian-based hip hop and rap singer from Malaysia who is active in the Malaysian musical industry. He has thus far created 3 albums and has collaborated with other artists for over 50 albums. Rabbit, who is also into hip-hop Malaysian Tamil Underground music, started his professional music career by making remixes of both English and Tamil songs.

== Career ==
At the beginning of Rabbits career Rabbits love for music and Rabbits desire to find chances caught the eye of several well‑known pubs and bistros in Penang. Rabbit worked as an emcee and DJ. Rabbit was hired for events hip‑hop shows and live performances. In 2005 Rabbit worked with Mista West and D.J. Bluezi on Rabbits studio album. Rabbit later appeared in a film called Maindhan where Rabbit shared the screen with Rabbits label partner Sheezay. The film was released on 7 August 2014. Was said to be the most expensive Tamil production in Malaysia, at that time.

In addition to his achievements Rabbit Mac has worked with several artists, including Bionic Asura, Dhilip Varman, Mista Gee, MC Phoenix, SatishDPaul Haze Freaky G, Saran Z, Sugu Amigoz, MC Syze, Lock Up Vassan, Sasi the Don, Nakeeran from Malaysia Shabir from Singapore Dinesh Kanagarathnam from Sri Lanka, DJ Sathya, Christopher Columbus from Singapore Srik from India and Charles Bosco from the United Kingdom. He also performed on. Composed a soundtrack for the Indian television programme "Thuppariyum Pulli" aired on Jaya TV. Rabbit Mac and PSYCHO.unit later collaborated with the film production company MIG Metrowealth on soundtracks, for the films "Senario" and “Ngangkung” both released in late 2009.

== Discography ==
=== Albums ===
Year	Title	Album	Composer	Type
2020	Ma Carrotz (Remastered)	"Album"	Rabbit Mac	Solo
2017	Rabbit and Friendz 3	"Compilation"	Rabbit Mac	Label Collaboration
2013	Rabbit and Friendz 2	"Compilation"	Rabbit Mac	Label Collaboration
2011	Rabbit and Friendz 1	"Compilation"	Rabbit Mac	Label Collaboration
2009	Ma Carrotz	"1st Album"	Rabbit Mac	Solo
2001	Rabbit's Provoked	"RT"	Rabbit Mac	Underground

=== Playback singing ===
Year	Title	Song	Composer	Language	Co-Singer(s)	Notes
2013	Race Gurram	"Sweety"	S. Thaman	Telugu	Siddharth Mahadevan	
2013	Biriyani	"Run For Your life"	Yuvan Shankar Raja	Tamil	Gaana Bala, Sheezay, Rubba Bend	
2015	Yatchan	"Champion"	Yuvan Shankar Raja	Tamil	Sheezay	
2015	Bruce Lee - The Fighter	"Ria"	S. Thaman	Telugu	Deepak	
2016	Kabali (Malay version)	"Wilayah Kabali"	Santhosh Narayanan	Malay	Waris (Malaysian musician)	Also lyricist for the song and "Membara" song
2018	Kanaa	"Savaal"	Dhibu Ninan Thomas	Tamil	Dhibu Ninan Thomas, Arunraja Kamaraj (Rap)	

== Filmography ==
Year	Title	Role	Notes
2014	Maindhan	Vinod	Also composer
