= Diya (actress) =

Indian film television actress and Anchor

- Occupation: Actress
- Years active: 2002–2008

Diya is an Indian actress who appeared in Tamil and Telugu language.

== Career ==
Diya was born into an orthodox Brahmin family in Hyderabad, and her family settled in Chennai when she was two years old. She trained as a dancer through lessons at the Kalakshetra Foundation, while also completing a bachelor's degree in psychology, a course in fashion technology, and a postgraduate course in computer science. Her first lead role came through Vishnuvardhan's Kurumbu (2003), and she subsequently played a similar glamorous role alongside Dhanush in Dreams (2004).

The actress was married in 2006 and subsequently opted out of the several unreleased projects she had committed to, including Seven, Sooravali and Century Raagam and thus ended her acting career. She married software engineer Aravind.

== Filmography ==
Year	Film	Role	Language	Notes
2002	Youth	Fashion show host	Tamil	Uncredited role
2003	Kurumbu	Ruchi	Tamil	
2004	Dreams	Shruti	Tamil	
2005	Karka Kasadara	Paaru	Tamil	
2006	Kodambakkam	Dhanam	Tamil	
2006	Asadhyudu	Madhuri	Telugu	
2008	Vambu Sandai	Swetha	Tamil	
2008	Kadhal Endral Enna	Kamala	Tamil	
