= Maindhan (2014 film) =

2014 Malaysian film by C. Kumaresan

- Film poster with old release date
- Directed by: C.Kumaresan
- Produced by: Gayatri Su Lin Pillai; C.Kumaresan
- Starring: C.Kumaresan; Shaila; Gheetha; Rabbit Mac
- Cinematography: Dave Nesan
- Edited by: M. S. Prem Nath
- Music by: Mansher Singh; Rabbit Mac
- Production companies: Astro Shaw; CK Films; SS Wawasan
- Distributed by: Lotus Five Star AV
- Release date: 8 August 2014 (Malaysia)
- Running time: 150 minutes
- Country: Malaysia
- Language: Tamil

Maindhan (transl. Son) is a 2014 Tamil-language Malaysian action comedy film directed by C. Kumaresan, who also enacted the lead role. The film also stars Shaila, Gheetha, Rabbit Mac, Hanuman and THR Uthaya. Malaysia rapper Darkey made a special appearance. The film had a limited release on 8 August 2014 in Malaysia and Singapore, and was later released in Tamil Nadu. It gained acclaim from critics and also emerged as the highest grossing locally produced Tamil film of all time before getting beaten by Vedigundu Pasangge in 2018.

== Plot ==
After failing in his love life, Dev finds company in alcohol. In his state, he often sees an old man who gives him hints on how his day is going to turn out. One day, he accidentally bumps into a young boy from a shelter home. He realises there is an uncanny similarity between the boy and his ex-girlfriend, so he decides to get to know the boy further only to uncover something Dev didn't wish he knew in the first place.

== Cast ==
- C. Kumaresan (CK) as Dev
- Shaila Nair as Shalini
- Geetha as Gayathri
- Rabbit Mac as Vinod
- Hanuman as Arun
- Uthaya THR Raaga
- Darkey
- Sheezay as Raj

== Production ==
Film and television actor C. Kumaresan (CK) made his directorial debut with this film, for which he is also a co-producer. In the film, he plays an illegal drifter who drives a Mazda RX-7 and underwent special training for the role. Shaila plays CK's love interest. Geetha plays an event manager although she was initially hesitant to act in films since she previously only produced several films. The movie is about child trafficking.

== Soundtrack ==
The songs were composed by Mansher Singh and Rabbit Mac.

No.	Title	Lyrics	Music	Singer(s)	Length
1.	"Pothumada Saami"	Maney Villanz	Mansher Singh	CK Hanumen	1:33
2.	"Idhayam Parakirrathey (Enu Mele Parakirari)"	Maney Villanz	Mansher Singh	Shaila Nair, Maney Villanz	1:40
3.	"Amsamana Kuluvali"	Maney Villanz	Mansher Singh	Gayathri Thandapany, Maney Villanz	1:47
4.	"Masuk (Amadi Embulay)"	Rabbit Mac	Rabbit Mac	Daddy Shaq, Rabbit Mac	1:53

== Reception ==
Malini Mannath of The New Indian Express wrote that "C.K. has a pleasant screen presence and plays Dev with style and attitude. The songs are pleasant to hear and well picturised. The ‘Masuk....’ number, the pick of the lot, is peppy with some catchy lyrics. But the screenplay is weak and inconsistent. A serious issue like child trafficking has been treated with flippancy" and concluded that "Maindhan at the most is a promising effort from a debutant maker".

Shaila Nair called the film one of her memorable projects. After this film, Gheetha starred in several Indian films such as Kaaval (2015) and Sangu Chakkaram (2017).

== Accolades ==
Date	Award	Category	Recipient(s) and nominee(s)	Result	Ref.
25 February 2015	Malaysian Kalai Ulagam Awards	Best Male Newcomer	Rabbit Mac	Won	
25 February 2015	Malaysian Kalai Ulagam Awards	Best Female Newcomer	Shaila Nair	Won	
25 February 2015	Malaysian Kalai Ulagam Awards	Best Editor	Prem Nath	Won	
2015	Edison Awards	Best Overseas Artiste	Geetha	Won	

== Home media ==
The film was available after 18 September 2014 on Astro First (Astro Ch 480).
