= Punnagai Poo Gheetha =

Malaysian radio personality, film producer and actress

"Punnagai Poo" Gheetha
- Born: Taiping, Perak, Malaysia
- Other name: Geetha THR Raaga
- Occupations: Radio personality, host, film producer, actress finance
- Years active: 2005–present

Gheetha Ammasee, best known by her stage name "Punnagai Poo" Gheetha, is a Malaysian radio personality, film producer and actress, who works in Malaysia and the Tamil film industry in India. Gheetha gained popularity as a radio jockey at the Malaysian radio station THR Raaga, before launching her own film production studio and venturing into Tamil cinema, becoming recognized as the first female producer from Malaysia. She has also worked as a host for various events and acted in several kollywood films as well as a Malaysian film.

== Career ==
Gheetha Ammasee was born in an Indian Malaysian Tamil family in Taiping, Perak, Malaysia as the daughter of a plantation owner. She started off as a host on the Malaysian television channel NTV7 on a show called Rhythm And Raaga, before starting her career as a radio jockey at the Malaysian Tamil radio station, THR Raaga. She has been working at THR Raaga since its inception. Besides her work in radio, she did hosting jobs, produced telefilms and opened her own advertising company called SG. During her time at THR Raaga, she acquired the sobriquet "Punnagai Poo", which is Tamil for "smiling flower".

Gheetha came to India and established a film production studio named SG Films to produce the film Arinthum Ariyamalum, directed by Vishnuvardhan, a family friend of hers. She had to release the film on her own since distributors did not have faith in a foreign investor and woman producer. The film became a commercial success, having collected twice its cost at the box office, and ran for 175 days at theatres, while Gheetha got an entry in the Malaysian Book Of Records for being the "first female Tamil movie producer to have produced a Tamil movie in India". Gheetha next funded Kundakka Mandakka, a low-budget comedy flick with R. Parthipan and Vadivelu in the principal roles, through which she was able to introduce five Malaysians actors in Tamil cinema, after which she and Vishnuvardhan decided to collaborate again on the director's next project, Pattiyal, which emerged a financial success, too. After Pattiyal, she took a break from Indian cinema and returned to her job in Malaysia. She co-hosted the Enthiran soundtrack release function held in Kuala Lumpur, Malaysia alongside actor Vivek in 2010.

After a sabbatical of five years, she returned to film production with Narthagi, a drama about transgender people featuring all newcomers, in which she was also seen in a short role. The next year, she produced the female-centric Oru Nadigaiyin Vaakkumoolam starring Sonia Agarwal, which featured Gheetha in a lengthier supporting role as a journalist, for which she shot for seven days. She then took on her first lead role in the Malaysian Tamil film Maindhan. Although she had played cameos and supporting roles in her earlier productions, she said that she was not "very much interested" in acting. When director C. Kumaresan offered her the lead female role in Maindhan, she declined initially and went on to dodge Kumaresan for a week before he managed to convince her. Playing an event manager in the film, Gheetha also performed stunts by herself, getting injured in the process. Maindhan went on to become the highest grossing locally produced Tamil film of all time in Malaysia and saw a theatrical release in India as well; Gheetha was later given the Edison Award in India for Best Overseas Artist.

She has co-produced two films, Sivappu along with Muktha Entertainment, a film revolving around Sri Lankan Tamil refugees in Tamil Nadu. and Kaaval, in which she also played the female lead for which Malaysian Book of Records gave her an award as the first Malaysian to play the lead in an Indian movie.

== Filmography ==
Year	Film	Credited as			Notes
Year	Film	Producer	Actor	Role	Notes
2005	Arinthum Ariyamalum	✓	✓	The collector	Cameo appearance
2005	Kundakka Mandakka	✓	✗	—	
2006	Pattiyal	✓	✓		Cameo appearance
2011	Narthagi	✓	✓		
2012	Oru Nadigaiyin Vaakkumoolam	✓	✓	Reeta	Cameo appearance
2014	Maindhan	✓	✓	Gayathri	Malaysian film; Edison Award for Best Overseas Artiste
2015	Kaaval	✓	✓	Amrutha	
2015	Sivappu	✓	✗	—	
2017	Sangu Chakkaram	✓	✓	Angayarkanni	
2021	Naanum Single Thaan	✓	✗	—	
2023	Sila Nodigalil	✓	✓	Medha	
2026	Sandakkari	✗	✓	Maya Azhagan's friend	
