= Kaaval (2015 film) =

2015 Indian film by Nagendran R.

- Poster
- Directed by: Nagendran R.
- Written by: Nagendran R.
- Produced by: Punnagai Poo Gheetha Philip Sheetal
- Starring: Samuthirakani; Vimal; Punnagai Poo Gheetha
- Cinematography: N. K. Ekambaram
- Edited by: Praveen K. L.
- Music by: G. V. Prakash Kumar; Dharan Kumar
- Production company: SG Films
- Release date: 26 June 2015
- Country: India
- Language: Tamil

Kaaval (transl. Police) is a 2015 Indian Tamil-language action film written and directed by Nagendran R., based on a true story and produced by Punnagai Poo Gheetha and Philip Sheetal. It stars Vimal, Samuthirakani and Punnagai Poo Gheetha. The film, which was initially titled Nee Yellam Nalla Varuvada, began production in 2013 and released on 26 June 2015

== Plot ==
Chandrasekar (Samuthirakani) is an honest police officer who is allowed to encounter the deadliest don who is responsible for all the murders that are happening in Tamil Nadu. But during the mission, he loses Alwin Sudan, one of his most intelligent encounter specialists. Later, he realizes that their carefully planned operation was leaked to the rivals by Anbarasu (Vimal), the son of a corrupt constable Kulasekaran (M. S. Bhaskar). Chandrasekar sketches a plan to encounter the don through Anbarasu.

== Cast ==
- Samuthirakani as Inspector Chandrasekhar
- Vimal as Anbarasu
- Punnagai Poo Gheetha as Amrutha
- M. S. Bhaskar as Kulasekaran
- Namo Narayana as Narayana
- Imman Annachi as Irudhayaraj
- Ashwin Raja as Anbarasu's friend
- Stunt Silva
- Singamuthu as Singaraj
- Naadodigal Gopal as Gopalaswamy
- TSK
- Senthi Kumari as Anbarasu's mother
- Venkat Subha
- Devendiran alias Deva as the Don
- Sneha in a cameo appearance
- Mannara Chopra in an item number

== Production ==
Nagendran, a former assistant of Seeman and Susi Ganesan announced in September 2013 that he would make his directorial debut with the project titled Nee Yellam Nalla Varuvada named after the dialogue spoken by Santhanam. Vimal, Samuthirakani recruited to play prominent characters along with Punnagai Poo Geetha, producer of this film playing the lead actress, M. S. Bhaskar, Singamuthu, Imman Annachi and Kumki Ashwin playing supporting roles. Mannara Chopra was selected to perform an item number.

G. V. Prakash Kumar was signed to produce the music, N. K. Ekambaram to handle the cinematography and Praveen-Srikanth were signed as the editors. Silva, Na. Muthukumar and Videsh were chosen as the stunt coordinator, lyricist and art director, respectively. The film which was reported to be based on a real-life incident started its filming in Pondicherry, which was held in Tamil Nadu and Kerala for 60 days. Nagendran revealed that the film was based on an M.Phil study which revolves around 34,712 murders that took place from 1995 to 2014. In April 2015, the film's title was changed into Kaaval as many people who saw the film, including promising directors, top industry personnel and police officials felt that the film deserved a more serious and purposeful title.

== Soundtrack ==
Kaaval

Soundtrack album by G. V. Prakash Kumar
- Released: 2015
- Genre: Feature film soundtrack
- Length: 22:42
- Language: Tamil
- Producer: G. V. Prakash Kumar

G. V. Prakash Kumar chronology
Idhu Enna Maayam (2015)	Kaaval (2015)	Kaaka Muttai (2015)

Dharan Kumar chronology
Naaigal Jaakirathai (2014)	Kaaval (2015)	Manal Kayiru 2 (2016)

The soundtrack was composed by G. V. Prakash Kumar and Dharan Kumar with background score composed by Dharan Kumar.

Tracklist
No.	Title	Lyrics	Music	Singers	Length
1.	"Sakka Podu"	Na. Muthukumar	G. V. Prakash Kumar	Tippu, Santosh Hariharan	3:39
2.	"Aadu Annatha"	Lalith Anandh	G. V. Prakash Kumar	Velmurugan, Maalavika Sundar, Santosh Hariharan	3:54
3.	"Un Kannukullara"	Snehan	G. V. Prakash Kumar	G. V. Prakash Kumar, Priya Himesh	5:02
4.	"Natta Nadu Iravula"	Purachikanal	Dharan Kumar	Sanjana Divaker Kalmanje	4:38
5.	"Aavaaram Poovukkum"	Na. Muthukumar	G. V. Prakash Kumar	Megha	4:39
6.	"Kaaval Theme"		G. V. Prakash Kumar	Yazin Nizar, Santosh Hariharan, Gowtham	0:50
Total length:					22:42

== Release ==
The film was given a "U/A" certificate by the Central Board of Film Certification. The film was initially slated to release on 19 June but was eventually released on 26 June.

=== Critical reception ===
The film received mixed reviews from critics. The Times of India rated the film 2 out of 5 and stated that "The problem with Kaaval is that it offers nothing new in terms of story and presentation. Almost every development feels been there done that". Gauthaman Baskaran of Hindustan Times rated it 1.5 out of 5 and wrote "In the end, the work turns out to be yet another addition to the list of very average movies". Behindwoods wrote "To sum up Kaaval, the cops vs contract killers theme is interesting and it has some good moments when Samuthirakani is in charge. But overall, the film doesn't create the desired impact".

Sify wrote, "Kaaval is a pucca mass masala entertainer with action, comedy, romance, sentiments and other elements associated with big-hero films. But it manages to entertain only at few places and most of the time; the clichéd execution dilutes the intensity". The New Indian Express wrote, "Fairly engaging in its story telling style, Kaaval seems to be a debutant director's tribute to the police force", calling it a "gripping tale about crime and retribution" and further wrote, .
