= Yatchan =

2015 Indian film by Vishnuvardhan

- Theatrical release poster
- Directed by: Vishnuvardhan
- Written by: Subha (story & dialogue)
- Screenplay by: Vishnuvardhan; Subha
- Based on: Yatchan by Subha
- Produced by: Siddharth Roy Kapur; Vishnuvardhan
- Starring: Arya; Kreshna; Deepa Sannidhi; Swati Reddy; Adil Hussain
- Cinematography: Om Prakash
- Edited by: A. Sreekar Prasad
- Music by: Yuvan Shankar Raja
- Production companies: UTV Motion Pictures; Vishnuvardhan Pictures
- Release date: 11 September 2015
- Running time: 140 minutes
- Country: India
- Language: Tamil

Yatchan (transl. Wizard) is a 2015 Indian Tamil-language action comedy film co written, co-produced and directed by Vishnuvardhan. The film was produced by Siddharth Roy Kapur under UTV Motion Pictures. The film features Arya, Kreshna, Swati Reddy, and Deepa Sannidhi in the lead roles, while Adil Hussain, RJ Balaji, Thambi Ramaiah, and Ponvannan play supporting roles. The music was composed by Yuvan Shankar Raja with cinematography by Om Prakash and editing by Sreekar Prasad. The film released on 11 September 2015 to negative reviews and bombed at the box office.

== Plot ==
"Thoothukudi" Chinna is a hooligan who is an ardent fan of Ajith Kumar and dreams to act with him one day. One day, he gets a call from Thangamani aka Sotta Mani to finish off Shwetha, who can see the future after an incident when she was young.

On the other hand, "Pazhani" Karthik wants to become an actor and loves Deepa, who supports his idea. However, his father does not want him to become one.

Eventually, Chinna and Karthik swap places just by getting into the wrong car. Chinna gets to act in a movie directed by S. J. Surya, in which he had chosen to introduce Karthik as a debutant. Now left with no choice, he chooses to introduce Chinna. The same happens to Karthik, who now has to do Chinna's job.

Meanwhile, Shwetha comes across a politician named Vetri. She heard that rumours were going on that Vetri killed his brother Selvam (also Adil Hussain). She did not suspect that was what happened until she touched his hand and realized that he actually did. One day, a few men come to attack Shwetha, but she is saved by Karthik. At that moment, a police officer named Devaraj investigates. After realizing Shwetha's ability, Vetri kidnaps her, Karthik, and Chinna. Soon, Durai asks Vetri what is the difference between him and Selvam as he explains that Vetri is doing this just for an MLA post. Vetri says that there is no difference and reveals that he is Selvam and that it was Vetri that died. Selvam explains that he was unhappy with his popularity, and jealous of his brother's. Devaraj also sided with him and covered the murder until Shwetha found out.

Somehow, Chinna and Karthik fight with Selvam. They manage to defeat and then bury him. The movie ends with the two of them going back to their own ways and with Karthik having a conversation with director Vishnuvardhan about another film.

== Cast ==
- Arya as "Thoothkudi" Chinna
- Kreshna as "Pazhani" Karthik
- Deepa Sannidhi as Shwetha
- Swati Reddy as Deepa
- Adil Hussain as Selvam/Vetri (dual role)
- RJ Balaji as Chandru
- Thambi Ramaiah as Thangamani aka Sotta Mani
- Ponvannan as Durai
- Azhagam Perumal as Panjamritham, Karthik's father
- Ajay Rathnam as Velraj
- Five Star Krishna as Logu
- Stunt Silva as Kailasam
- Sendrayan as Mark
- R. Amarendran as Jack (travel fixer)
- Baby Neha as Anitha, Karthik's sister
- Y. G. Mahendra as Maindhan
- M. S. Bhaskar
- Robo Shankar
- Yogi Babu as Durai's henchman
- Mathew Varghese as Doctor
- Amritha Aiyer as Kumaran Tours & Travels worker
- Kumar Natarajan as S. J. Surya's assistant
- Aarthi (guest appearance in song "Kaakaponnu")
- S. J. Surya as himself (guest appearance)
- Gautham Vasudev Menon as himself (guest appearance)
- Venkat Prabhu as himself (guest appearance)
- Vishnuvardhan as himself (guest appearance)
- Om Prakash as himself (guest appearance)
- Premgi Amaren as himself (guest appearance)
- Japan Kumar as himself (guest appearance)

== Production ==
In December 2013, Vishnuvardhan announced that he was scripting an action romantic-comedy film featuring his brother Kreshna along with Arya in the lead roles. The story of the film, written by writer duo Subha, is based on a novel of the same name that the pair had written. The film was subsequently launched on 14 April 2014, with the cast and crew of the film announced at the launch event. Vishnuvardhan besides directing, also decided to produce the film in association with UTV Motion Pictures.

In May 2014, Kannada actress Deepa Sannidhi was signed up as the pair of Arya, while Swathi Reddy was chosen as the second female lead, with the actress stating that she had "a strong, supportive character". RJ Balaji stated in June that he had shot for the film for two days in Chennai, while director S J Surya too agreed to perform a guest role, shooting for three days in October. Adil Hussain was signed for an important role, making his Tamil film debut, who said his role was "versatile, layered and has a lot of grey shades" while adding that the story was "amazingly complex yet gripping". Y Gee Mahendra was given the role of a politician, with the actor stating that his character played an "important role in the unfurling of events in the film".

== Soundtrack ==
Yatchan

Soundtrack album by Yuvan Shankar Raja
- Released: 19 August 2015
- Genre: Feature film soundtrack
- Label: Zee Music Company
- Producer: Yuvan Shankar Raja

Yuvan Shankar Raja chronology
Massu Engira Masilamani (2015)	Yatchan (2015)	Madura Veeran (2018)

Yuvan Shankar Raja has composed five songs with lyrics written by Pa Vijay. The soundtrack received positive reviews from critics. Behindwoods rated the album 3 out of 5 stars stating "The Hit combo returns for another winner "

Track listing
No.	Title	Lyrics	Singer(s)	Length
1.	"Parapara"	Pa. Vijay	Vijay Yesudas, Ranjith	3:24
2.	"Konjalaai"	Pa. Vijay	Yuvan Shankar Raja, Tanvi Shah	4:01
3.	"Kaaka Ponnu"	Pa. Vijay	Anthony Dasan, Priyadarshini, Yuvan Shankar Raja	3:05
4.	"Innum Enna"	Pa. Vijay	Yuvan Shankar Raja	3:30
5.	"Champion"	Pa Vijay	Rabbit Mac, Sheezay from Psycho Unit	2:53
Total length:				17:04

== Critical reception ==
Malini Mannath of The New Indian Express wrote "Yatchan, a promising scenario in the first half, is a let down in the second half". M Suganth of The Times of India wrote "Yatchan's failing is that despite moments that click, it fails to come together as a whole. The wildness of the tone makes it hard for us to take things seriously or care for the characters". Rediff rated 2 out of 5 and mentioned "The unexciting screenplay, coupled with the lacklustre performances, make Yatchan an ordinary fare". Behindwoods rated 2.5 out of 5 and wrote "Yatchan is not a film that might put a smile on your face when you leave the cinema hall but at the same time it is not a film that would make you regret either. Certainly it has some highpoints. It would have been great if it was consistently entertaining and edgy".
