= Pattiyal =

- DVD cover
- Directed by: Vishnuvardhan
- Written by: Rajkannan (Dialogue)
- Screenplay by: Vishnuvardhan
- Produced by: Punnagai Poo Gheetha
- Starring: Bharath; Arya; Pooja; Padmapriya
- Cinematography: Nirav Shah
- Edited by: A. Sreekar Prasad
- Music by: Yuvan Shankar Raja
- Production company: SG Films
- Distributed by: SG Films
- Release date: 17 March 2006
- Running time: 140 minutes
- Country: India
- Language: Tamil

Pattiyal (transl. List) is a 2006 Indian Tamil-language action thriller film written and directed by Vishnuvardhan and produced by Punnagai Poo Gheetha. It stars Bharath, Arya, Pooja Umashankar, and Padmapriya Janakiraman while Cochin Haneefa and Santhana Bharathi play pivotal roles.

Based on the 1999 Thai film Bangkok Dangerous, the film tackles the issue of dons. It is a morbid telling of two orphaned youths who have been friends from a very young age with incredible realism of trust, friendship, and ultimate betrayal.

The film's score and soundtrack are composed by Yuvan Shankar Raja with cinematography by Nirav Shah and editing by A. Sreekar Prasad. It was released on 17 March 2006.

== Plot ==
Kosi and Selva are contract killers working for a middleman ironically named Sami, who also works as a government employee and is known to use the dialogue "Koduthu Vachavanga da neenga" when talking to the boys. Kosi is an unblinking man with a stubborn feel for life, refusing to love or be loved and caring only about himself and Selva. Selva, deaf and dumb, is equally intrepid, though he has a heart ticking beneath his dark, dire exterior. The duo spends their time watching movies, smoking cigarettes, and playing football with Dheena and his gang, local thugs in their area. Kosi is known to drink a lot, a trait Selva does not share.

Saroja, a salesgirl at a garment company, is outgoing, sprightly, and a friend of both Kosi and Selva. She is deeply in love with Kosi, but Kosi finds her presence a nuisance. Meanwhile, Saroja's chief manager, Azhagu, stubbornly tries to make her fall in love with him, even though she does not like him and even slaps him when he makes lewd comments towards her. In stark contrast to this romance is the love between Selva and Sandhya, who are smitten with each other after some fate-based encounters that bring lighthearted humor. Selva introduces Sandhya to Kosi and Saroja.

Dheena and his gang eventually find out about Kosi and Selva's activities. They warn the two friends to quit, but Kosi assures Dheena that they will not harm him and his men. Saami continues giving Selva and Kosi assignments, and he even gives them a gun to finish their targets from now on, which Kosi is initially against, as he prefers using an aruval, which they usually use to kill their targets. Kosi and Selva then use the gun to kill their targets henceforth after spending time practicing how to use it with Kosi occasionally using the aruval. Saami then instructs the duo to assassinate Avinashi Nachimuthu Gounder, a business tycoon and rising politician. They agree to make this assignment their last so they can lead normal lives. Despite Selva's initial reluctance, Kosi convinces him to make it their last. A new twist occurs when the people who hired Saami tell him to finish off Kosi and Selva once the job is completed. Kosi and Saroja end up sleeping together when Kosi begins to drink excessively, promptly making him start to realise his feelings for Saroja. Unfortunately, this newfound happiness does not last as their profession does not allow it, even though the duo decides to make this assignment their last to begin a new life with their newfound lovers.

While preparing for the assassination, Kosi cannot think, overwhelmed with feelings of love. Selva decides he should finish the execution himself and Kosi should speak with Saroja. Kosi visits Saroja outside her home, where he finds her shivering and with bruises. Saroja then tells Kosi how Azhagu intruded on the house and sexually violated her after she refused to love him. Infuriated at this, an emotionally shaken Kosi armed with a knife finds Azhagu in a public restroom and engages in a duel with him, with Azhagu, beating him to a horrific death by smashing a urinal on his face sustaining few injuries after Azhugu knocks Kosi's knife away midst of their fight and Kosi having to knock Azhagu unconscious. Meanwhile, Selva cunningly assassinates Gounder and his concubine using the gun with the help of Saami's assistants Neelan and Murugan and is returning home. Azhagu's boss and father-in-law, Rana, a big don himself, realizes that Kosi is responsible for Azhagu's death from his henchmen, who learn about Kosi from Dheena and his gang, and seeks revenge. He gets hold of Saami through his henchmen and blackmails him to bring Kosi to him for his life. Unknowingly, Kosi goes with Saami unarmed and is killed in the ambush by gunshots to his head and heart by Rana himself, as Kosi manages to defeat him and his henchmen, managing to kill few of them(with their own knife and his bare hands) before dying. Rana has his main henchman take Kosi's corpse away with the assistance of another henchman as Saami watches gleefully.

Selva, who returns later, realizes this unfortunate event and hallucinates Kosi with bullet wounds watching over him. Filled with sorrow over Kosi's death seeks revenge after performing Kosi's last rites. He visits Saroja and questions her about Kosi's murder and the people responsible. He also writes a letter to Sandhya who begins to not talk to him after an incident (before Kosi died and Selva left to kill Gounder involving Selva using his gun to save himself and Sandhya from the clutches of a group of henchmen (who were actually Rana's henchmen who tried to kill Kosi and Selva earlier when they began killing Rana's associates and henchmen with their aruval whilst working for Saami and Selva even shoots one of them with the help of Kosi when Rana and his henchmen were present, causing the henchmen to chase after them, even though Rana or neither Selva and Kosi did not clearly see each other during the incident) about how he feels about her and how he is lonely now after Kosi is gone. He then intrudes on Rana's house unarmed, mercilessly killing most of his henchmen(especially his main henchman by smashing a TV on his face and his last henchman by stabbing him in the neck with his own knife) in his way, and eventually Rana himself(despite his family pleading with Selva to stop whom he pushes aside and after evading from getting shot by Rana) by stabbing him with a broken piece of glass from the TV after throwing his gun away and beating him up several times, avenging Kosi's death, he continues to beat Rana's corpse when he imagines Kosi watching over him. When Selva returns home with wounds from his fight with Rana's henchmen, Sandhya rushes to see him and is shocked to see him injured. She tells him to wait by the door while she calls an auto rickshaw to get them both to the hospital. Meanwhile, Sappa (the irritating boy who works as the server at the restaurant where Kosi and Selva used to meet up with Saami kept begging them, especially Kosi, to introduce him to Saami for a job even though he did not know what kind of job they had and even told Rana's henchmen about Saami when they were searching for Saami after learning about him through the restaurant's owner to get hold of Kosi) stabs Selva outside his home in the same approach as Selva did to an unknown man with his knife in the introduction scene in a hotel room. Sappa, still recovering from the shock that he actually stabbed Selva, stabs him again multiple times, pours sand on him, and runs away when he sees Sandhya rushing towards Selva. Selva begins regretting his actions as the contract killer and thinks of the good times he spent with Kosi, Sandhya, and Saroja as he falls and dies from multiple wounds, with Sandhya by his side, who cries in despair.

In the scene before the credits, Saami chats with Sappa at the restaurant where the former used to meet up with Kosi and Selva. It is also revealed in this scene that it was Saami who ordered Sappa to kill Selva in the first place and that he should pour sand on the part where he stabbed Selva so that he would be dead before the doctors could clean his wounds. Sappa requests Saami not to kill him like he killed off Kosi and Selva. The scene is shown as a deja-vu where Saami convinces Selva and Kosi that they are all part of this scheme together. Saami uses the same dialogue, "Koduthu Vachavan da nee" with the boy after telling him that they are like brothers to convince him that he and Saami are in the same team, letting the audience connect that Sappa will be killed too.

== Cast ==
- Bharath as Selva
- Arya as Kosi
- Pooja as Sandhya
- Padmapriya Janakiraman as Saroja
- Cochin Haneefa as Saami
- Santhana Bharathi as Avinashi Nachimuthu Gounder
- Mohan Natrajan as Don Rana
- Gowtham Sundararajan as Azhagu
- Aarthi as Aarthi, Sandhya's friend
- Krishna as Krishna, Selva's favorite actor
- Vatsala Rajagopal as Sandhya's grandmother
- Dileepan as Sappa
- Ajay Rathnam as the politician who orders the hit on Avinashi Nachi Muthu Gounder
- O. A. K. Sundar as one of Selva and Kosi's last targets whom Kosi kills with his aruval
- Neelan K. Sekar
- Punnagai Poo Gheetha as the politician's wife (cameo appearance)

== Production ==
After Arindhum Ariyamalum (2005), Vishnuvardhan decided to make a film on gangsters of Chennai and he spoke to "real hired killers" for a month. To make it emotional, he decided on the theme of "two orphans on the street" as main theme. The inspiration for Bharath's character was from an undisclosed Asian film while Arya's character was based on a real-life person. The filming was held at Chennai, Goa, Pondicherry and Coimbatore.

== Soundtrack ==
The soundtrack was composed by Vishnuvardhan's norm composer Yuvan Shankar Raja. It features 6 tracks overall with lyrics by Pa. Vijay. The interlude from the song "Aadaludan Paadalai Ketu" from Kudiyirundha Koyil (1968) composed by M. S. Viswanathan was re-used in the song "Namma Kattula Mazhai Peiyuthu" which was sung by Yuvan's father Ilaiyaraaja. The song "Poga Poga Boomi Virikirathe" proved a breakthrough for singer Vijay Yesudas.

Track listing
No.	Title	Singer(s)	Length
1.	"Dei Namma"	Vijay Yesudas	3:36
2.	"Yedhedo Ennangal"	Yuvan Shankar Raja, Shweta Mohan	4:16
3.	"Kannai Vittu"	Yuvan Shankar Raja	2:26
4.	"Namma Kattula"	Ilaiyaraaja, Roshini	3:54
5.	"Kannai Vittu (Remix)"	Yuvan Shankar Raja, Premji Amaran	3:25
6.	"Poga Poga"	Haricharan, Vijay Yesudas, Saindhavi, Harini Sudhakar	4:42
Total length:			28:02

== Reception ==
S. Sudha of Rediff.com wrote, "In his third film Pattiyal, [Vishnuvardhan] proves that apart from writing a good screenplay, he can make a technically superior film". Lajjavathi of Kalki praised the music, art direction, cinematography and stunt choreography and concluded praising the climax for stressing on the message of violence never pays and applauding Vishnuvardhan for taking to the new route of Tamil cinema. The film was a commercial success, grossing ₹11 crore at the box office. Yuvan Shankar Raja won the Tamil Nadu State Film Award for Best Music Director.
