= Vishnuvardhan (director) =

Indian filmmaker (born 1976)

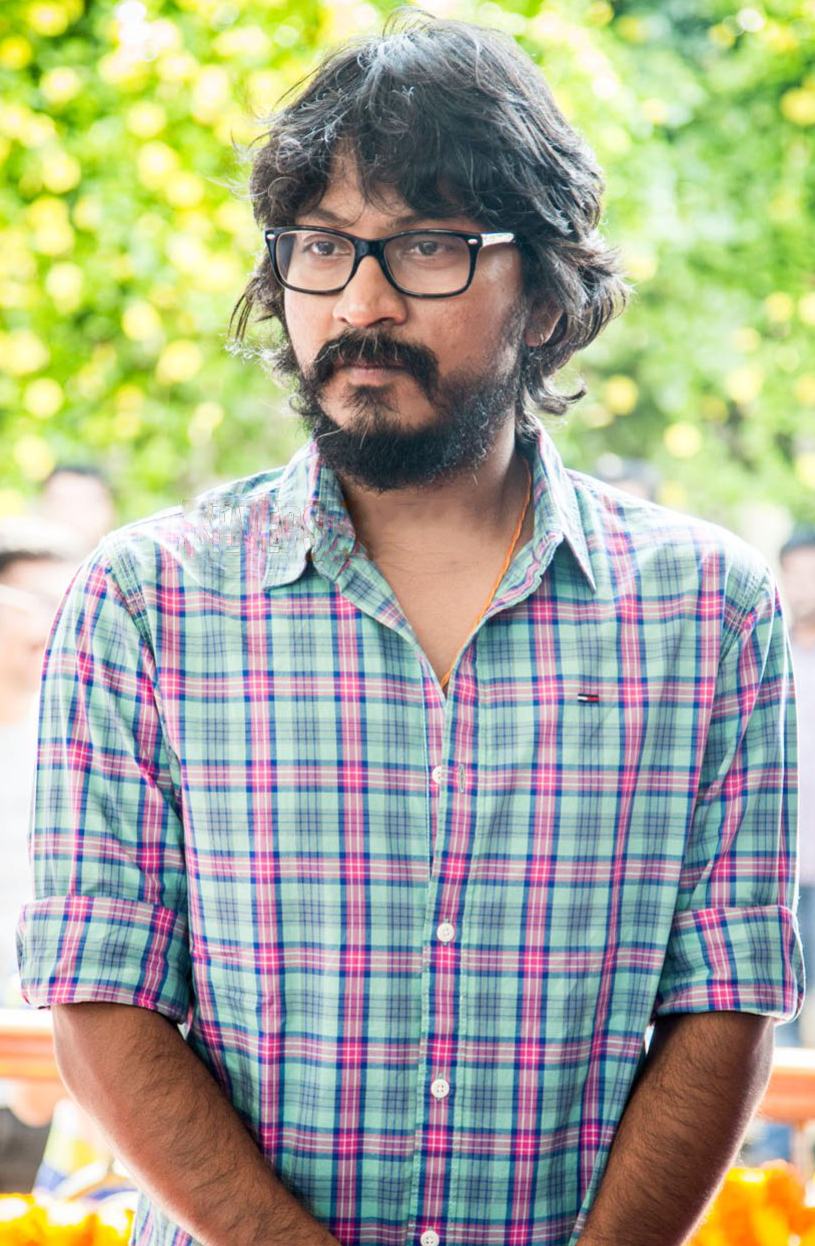
- Vishnuvardhan at the Graghanam Movie Launch
- Born: Vishnuvardhan Kulasekaran; 6 December 1976 (age 49); Chennai, Tamil Nadu India
- Occupations: Film director; film producer; screenwriter
- Years active: 1990–present
- Spouse: Anu Vardhan
- Children: 1
- Relatives: N. S. Krishnan (grandfather-in-law); T. A. Mathuram (grandmother-in-law); Krishna Kulasekaran (brother)

Vishnuvardhan (born 6 December 1976) is an Indian film director, screenwriter, producer and former child actor who works in Tamil films.

A long-time associate of Santosh Sivan, he made his directorial debut in 2003 with Kurumbu, which did not fare well at the box office. However, his subsequent films, Arinthum Ariyamalum (2005), Pattiyal (2006), Billa (2007), Panjaa (2011) and Arrambam (2013) went on to become highly successful ventures, turning him into one of the best directors in Tamil Nadu. He made his debut in Hindi cinema with Shershaah (2021), produced by Karan Johar, under Dharma Productions, for which he received positive reviews and even won filmfare award for best director.

== Early life ==
Vishnuvardhan was born and raised in Chennai, Tamil Nadu. His father is Pattiyal K Shekar, an actor and producer, who worked in Tamil films. He has a younger brother Krishna Kulasekaran who is an actor in the Tamil film industry. Vishnuvardhan went to St. Bede's Anglo Indian Higher Secondary School, Chennai and studied visual communication at Loyola College, Chennai.

Vishnuvardhan and his brother used to participate in extra-curricular activities like dance and drama in school. When director Mani Ratnam was looking for children to cast in his film Anjali, his school suggested his name and he shot for the dance sequence "Something Something" in the film with his brother and other children. He later appeared in Chatriyan (as the young Vijayakanth) and Iruvar by Mani Ratnam again. While in college, Santosh Sivan, cinematographer of Mani Ratnam's films, called Vishnuvardhan to act in his directorial The Terrorist. Vishnuvardhan said "I was influenced and inspired by the works of Mani Ratnam and Santosh Sivan. Watching them create magic on screen fascinated me and I wanted to learn filmmaking". While working for The Terrorist, he expressed his desire to Sivan, that he would like to assist him, he accepted him as an apprentice and later as an associate director. He worked for seven years as an assistant director to him in Mumbai for films like Asoka (2001).

== Career ==
After Vishnuvardhan returned from Mumbai, Gemini Color Labs that had produced The Terrorist offered him to remake the Telugu comedy film Allari in Tamil. Although he did not want his first film to be a remake, he accepted since he felt he shouldn't "ruin the chance". The film, titled Kurumbu (2003), featuring Allari Naresh, who played the same role in the original, alongside Nikita Thukral and Diya, did not do well at the box office. His next film was Arinthum Ariyamalum (2005), which was the first script he had written and was supposed to mark his directorial debut. He said that no big hero wanted to star in it and nobody wanted to produce the film. After he had signed the principal cast, he decided to start his own production studio SJ Films with Malaysian radio jockey, Punnagai Poo Geetha, and produce the film on his own. Starring Prakash Raj, alongside then newcomers Arya, Navdeep and Samiksha, the film was better received than his first film, critically as well as commercially. Sify called it "a taut and fairly engrossing entertainer" and the film was termed a "super hit" having collected twice its cost at the box office.

Geetha and Vishnu then collaborated once more in the critically acclaimed Pattiyal (2006) which also proved to be successful. The film, which starred Arya, Bharath, Pooja and Padmapriya, was recognised for its outstanding music by Yuvan Shankar Raja. Vishnu was praised for handling a serious subject while retaining the entertainment factor in the film. Sify stated that Vishnuvardhan "rewrote the rules of Tamil commercial cinema", and went on to compare him with director Mani Ratnam. In an interview, Vishnu stated that he had interacted with real gangsters and studied their lifestyle. Vishnuvardhan's next film Billa (2007), a remake of the yesteryear classic, starring Ajith Kumar, Nayanthara and Namitha, was a big blockbuster. His Sarvam (2009) starring Arya and Trisha which received mixed reviews did averagely at the box office whereas his next debut film in Telugu, Panjaa (2011), was one of the most stylish films of Pawan Kalyan. Vishnuvardhan's next directorial, Arrambam (2013) starring Ajith Kumar, Nayanthara and Arya was a huge success. In 2015, Yatchan brings together Arya and director Vishnuvardhan for the fifth time and is said to be a gangster film with a powerful message. Vishnuvardhan's brother Kreshna is acting in his direction for the first time in his career and the actor is also teaming up with Arya for the first time. In 2019, he produced the web series Fingertip where Akshara Haasan was seen playing the female lead. He directed a Hindi film Shershaah (2021) is based on the life of the late Captain Vikram Batra and features Sidharth Malhotra in the titular role. Vishnuvardhan says that he is overwhelmed by the positive response to his maiden Hindi film Shershaah though he expected it to do well. He made his comeback in the Tamil film industry after a long hiatus with Nesippaya (2025) starring Akash Murali and Aditi Shankar in the lead roles.

== Personal life ==
Vishnuvardhan is married to costume designer Anu Vardhan, granddaughter of Tamil actor and singer N. S. Krishnan. Anu was a classmate of Vishnuvardhan in college and also worked as an assistant to Santosh Sivan. Vishnuvardhan stated that they got married "just after college" when he had joined the industry as an assistant director. Anu has worked as the costume designer in all of Vishnuvardhan's films.

== Filmography ==
=== As director and screenwriter ===
List of Vishnuvardhan credits as a director and screenwriter
Year	Film	Notes
2003	Kurumbu	
2005	Arinthum Ariyamalum	
2006	Pattiyal	
2007	Billa	
2009	Sarvam	
2011	Panjaa	Telugu film
2013	Arrambam	
2015	Yatchan	Also produced with UTV Motion Pictures
2021	Shershaah	Hindi film
2025	Nesippaya	

=== As an actor ===
List of Vishnuvardhan credits as an actor
Year	Film	Role	Notes	Ref.
1990	Anjali	Colony kid	Child actor; uncredited	
1990	Chatriyan	Young Chatriyan	Child actor	
1997	Iruvar	Tamizhselvan's son		
1998	Malli	Sundaram		
1998	The Terrorist	Thyagu		
2015	Yatchan	Himself	Cameo appearance	

=== Television ===
==== As producer ====
List of Vishnuvardhan credits in television
Year	Film	Notes			
Year	Film	Notes	2019	Fingertip	Web series available on ZEE5 platform

== Awards and nominations ==
Year	Award	Category	Work	Result	Ref.
2014	SIIMA Awards	Best Director - Tamil	Arrambam	Nominated	
2022	IIFA Awards	Best Director	Shershaah	Won	
2022	Filmfare Awards	Best Director	Shershaah	Won	
