= Arinthum Ariyamalum =

2005 Indian action drama film

- Poster
- Directed by: Vishnuvardhan
- Written by: Neelan K. Sekar; N. Ramana Gopinath (Dialogue)
- Screenplay by: Vishnuvardhan
- Story by: Vishnuvardhan
- Produced by: Punnagai Poo Gheetha
- Starring: Navdeep; Arya; Prakash Raj; Sameksha
- Cinematography: Nirav Shah
- Edited by: A. Sreekar Prasad
- Music by: Yuvan Shankar Raja
- Production company: SG Films
- Release date: 20 May 2005
- Running time: 137 minutes
- Country: India
- Language: Tamil

Arinthum Ariyamalum (transl. Knowingly and Unknowingly) is a 2005 Indian Tamil-language crime action film written and directed by Vishnuvardhan. It stars Navdeep, Arya, Prakash Raj, and Sameksha, while Adithya, Sangili Murugan, Krishna, and Yog Japee play pivotal roles. The film marks the debut of Arya and the Tamil debut of Sameksha. The film's music was composed by Yuvan Shankar Raja with cinematography by Nirav Shah and editing by A. Sreekar Prasad. "Punnagai Poo" Gheetha, an RJ at Malaysian radio station THR Raaga, produced the film.

The film was released theatrically on 20 May 2005. It completed a 175-day run at the box office. The film eventually went on to receive Filmfare Award for Best Male Debut – South for Arya.

== Plot ==
Sathya is a naive boy raised by his grandfather in Nagercoil. He moves to Chennai to pursue his engineering degree. He stays with his friend Krishna and befriends Sandhya, whom he falls for. He meets Kutty, an intimidating rogue, when he saves a stranger injured in a road accident. He runs into Kutty again in the middle of a fight with a rival gang, and Kutty accidentally shoots Sandhya in the chaos. Sandhya recovers, but Sathya lodges a complaint with the police.

Kutty is the adopted son of Adhi Narayanan, a businessman with powerful influence. ACP Thiyagarajan arrests Kutty, but Adhi bails him out very soon. Adhi abducts Sathya but gently warns and sends him away, since he is very young. When performing a rite for his deceased wife Lakshmi, Adhi learns that Sathya has performed the rites for the same woman. He confirms with a background check that he is indeed his son.

In a flashback, it is revealed that Lakshmi married Adhi against her father's wishes. She was not comfortable with his proximity to violence and wanted him to quit working for his boss. Adhi complies, but after witnessing the murder of his boss, he kills the henchmen and is arrested. Unrevealed to him, Lakshmi had been pregnant, and she wanted to reveal it once Adhi put his violent life behind him. Lakshmi gives birth to Sathya and dies during childbirth.

Adhi and Kutty start being affectionate with Sathya, albeit in their meddling, intimidating way, which upsets him. Sathya saves Kutty's life from the goons, but Adhi berates him for fighting in front of Sathya. To mend his relationship with Sathya, Kutty talks to Sandhya's parents, asking for her hand in marriage to Sathya. Her family is disturbed and informs Sathya to stay away from them.

Sathya, in an angry fit, calls Kutty an orphan and yells at Adhi to forget he has a son. Kutty and Adhi try to pacify him but are ambushed by Thiyagarajan and other cops. In a following shootout, Kutty and Adhi are shot and presumably die in a car explosion. Sathya calls Adhi his father for the first time and says he never wished death on them. It is revealed that they survived the accident, and the three reunite.

== Cast ==
- Navdeep as Sathya Narayanan
- Arya as Kutty Narayanan
- Prakash Raj as Adhi Narayanan, Sathya's biological father and Kutty's foster father
- Lakshmi Vasudevan as Lakshmi Narayanan, Adhi Narayanan's wife and Sathya's biological mother
- Sameksha as Sandhya, Sathya's love interest
- Adithya as ACP Thiyagarajan
- Sangili Murugan as Ganapathi, Adhi Narayanan's brother
- Krishna as Krishna, Sathya's college friend
- Yog Japee as Mani
- Punnagai Poo Gheetha as the collector
- ‘Nair’ Raman as Sathya's uncle's father
- Ravi Raj as Subramani, Sandhya's father
- Boys Rajan as a Police officer
- Master Sachin as Sathya's friend
- Supriya as a special appearance in the song "Theepidika Theepidika"

== Soundtrack ==
The soundtrack and film score were composed by Yuvan Shankar Raja, joining again with director Vishnuvardhan after Kurumbu (2003). The soundtrack was released on 10 April 2005. The song "Theepidika", in particular, gained cult status. It incorporates elements of the song "Bhoomiyil Maanida Jenmam" from the 1941 Tamil film Ashok Kumar, featuring the voice of M. K. Thyagaraja Bhagavathar; composed by Papanasam Sivan.

Track listing
| No. | Title | Lyrics | Singer(s) | Length |
|---|---|---|---|---|
| 1. | "Yela Yela" | Snehan | Ranjith, Sujatha Mohan | 4:13 |
| 2. | "Konjam Konjam" | Pa. Vijay | Mahua Kamat | 4:54 |
| 3. | "Theepidika" | Pa. Vijay | Anushka Manchanda, Premgi Amaren | 4:35 |
| 4. | "En Kannodu" | Pa. Vijay | Yuvan Shankar Raja, Nidesh Gopalan | 3:25 |
| 5. | "Sil Sil" | Pa. Vijay | Sathyan, Chinmayi | 3:53 |
| Total length: | | | | 21:00 |

== Reception ==
Sify wrote that "The highlight of the film is that it is racy and the casting is perfect. The designer look, comic one-liners and great action scenes makes the film watchable. The sentimental happy ending contributes considerably towards tugging at the heartstrings. Prakash Raj, clearly having a Ghilli hangover is extraordinary". Kalki rated the film "above average". The Hindu wrote, "Sometimes striking a serious note, suddenly lending it a comic twist and eventually wrapping it all up in absolute bonhomie, writer-director Vishnuvardhan's palatable treatment is a pleasant surprise".
