= Kurumbu =

2003 film by Vishnuvardhan

- DVD cover
- Directed by: Vishnuvardhan
- Screenplay by: Vishnuvardhan
- Story by: Nivas
- Produced by: Akkineni Indira Anand
- Starring: Naresh; Nikita Thukral; Diya
- Cinematography: Ra. Krishnaa
- Edited by: A. Sreekar Prasad
- Music by: Yuvan Shankar Raja
- Production company: Indira Innovations
- Release date: 21 November 2003
- Country: India
- Language: Tamil

Kurumbu (transl. Naughty) is a 2003 Indian Tamil-language teen romantic comedy film directed by Vishnuvardhan, making his directorial debut. The film, a remake of the 2002 Telugu film Allari, stars Naresh, who also starred in the original version, along with Nikita Thukral and Diya. The film was released on 21 November 2003, failing to repeat the success of the original version and hence, ending up as a box-office bomb. Although there is the Telugu original, it was dubbed in Telugu also as Naa Allari.

== Plot ==
Kurumbu deals with a love triangle between three teenagers. The story portrays how the hero finds his true love.

== Cast ==
- Naresh as Ravi
- Nikita as Aparna
- Diya as Ruchi
- Pyramid Natarajan as Ravi's father
- Meera Krishnan as Kalyani, Ravi's mother
- Apsara as Ravi's sister
- Kuyili as Aparna's mother
- Nassar as Ruchi's father
- Nirosha as Jaya, Ruchi's mother
- R. S. Shivaji as Arokyam, a lift man in the apartment
- Bava Lakshmanan as Singaram
- Ramya Krishnan (special appearance)

== Production ==
After Vishnuvardhan returned from Mumbai, Gemini Color Labs that had produced The Terrorist offered him to remake the Telugu comedy film Allari in Tamil. Although he did not want his first film to be a remake, he accepted since he felt he shouldn't "ruin the chance". The film saw Naresh from the original film reprising his role which marked his debut in Tamil alongside debutant actresses Nikita Thukral and Diya. The entire filming was held at Chennai.

== Soundtrack ==
The music was composed by Yuvan Shankar Raja, teaming up with Vishnuvardhan, who since then has worked together with him and scored the music in all his films until Shershaah. The soundtrack includes a remix of the song "Aasai Nooru Vagai" from the 1983 Tamil film Adutha Varisu, composed by Ilaiyaraaja, Yuvan's father. This was considered to have started off a new trend and the era of remixes in the Tamil film industry. The soundtrack was launched in HFO discotheque while the film crew conducted talent hunt for singers in the same location to promote the film.

Song	Singer(s)	Duration	Lyrics
"Kingini Mingini"	Yuvan Shankar Raja, Shalini Singh, Prashanthini	3:57	Pa. Vijay
"Oviya"	P. S. Balram	4:11	Pa. Vijay
"Adichchi Pudichchi"	Devan Ekambaram, Sunitha Sarathy	4:07	Pa. Vijay
"Kurumbu"	Instrumental		Pa. Vijay
"Theme Music"	Instrumental		Pa. Vijay
"Aasai Nooru Vagai"	Malaysia Vasudevan, Devan Ekambaram	4:04	Panchu Arunachalam
"Adichchi Pudichchi — II"	Afroze, Gopika Poornima		Pa. Vijay
"Vaa Masakaatre"	Srinivas, Harish Raghavendra, Srilekha Parthasarathy, Subiksha	4:49	Pa. Vijay

== Critical reception ==
Malathi Rangarajan of The Hindu opined that "After all the hype and pre-release publicity of the film you expected much more. But leave alone making you laugh, this Kurumbu does not even tickle". A critic from Deccan Herald wrote that "Kurumbu, directed by debutant Vishnuvardhan is clearly targetted at the youth". Malini Mannath of Chennai Online wrote that "A faithful remake of the Telugu hit ‘Allari', 'Kurumbu', directed by debutant Vishnuvardhan (apprenticed with Santosh Sivan) and produced by Indira Innovations, is clearly targetted at the youth". Visual Dasan of Kalki criticised the film for excessive vulgarity but called Nikitha's love as relief and added it seems that Vishnuvardhan, who has miserably directed an old story with a very old screenplay, will not watch Tamil films. Cinesouth wrote, "The film moves at such a slow pace. But, even after the film's over, you remember only two things- the hero Naresh's antics and some very naughty scenes".
