= Shilpa Natarajan =

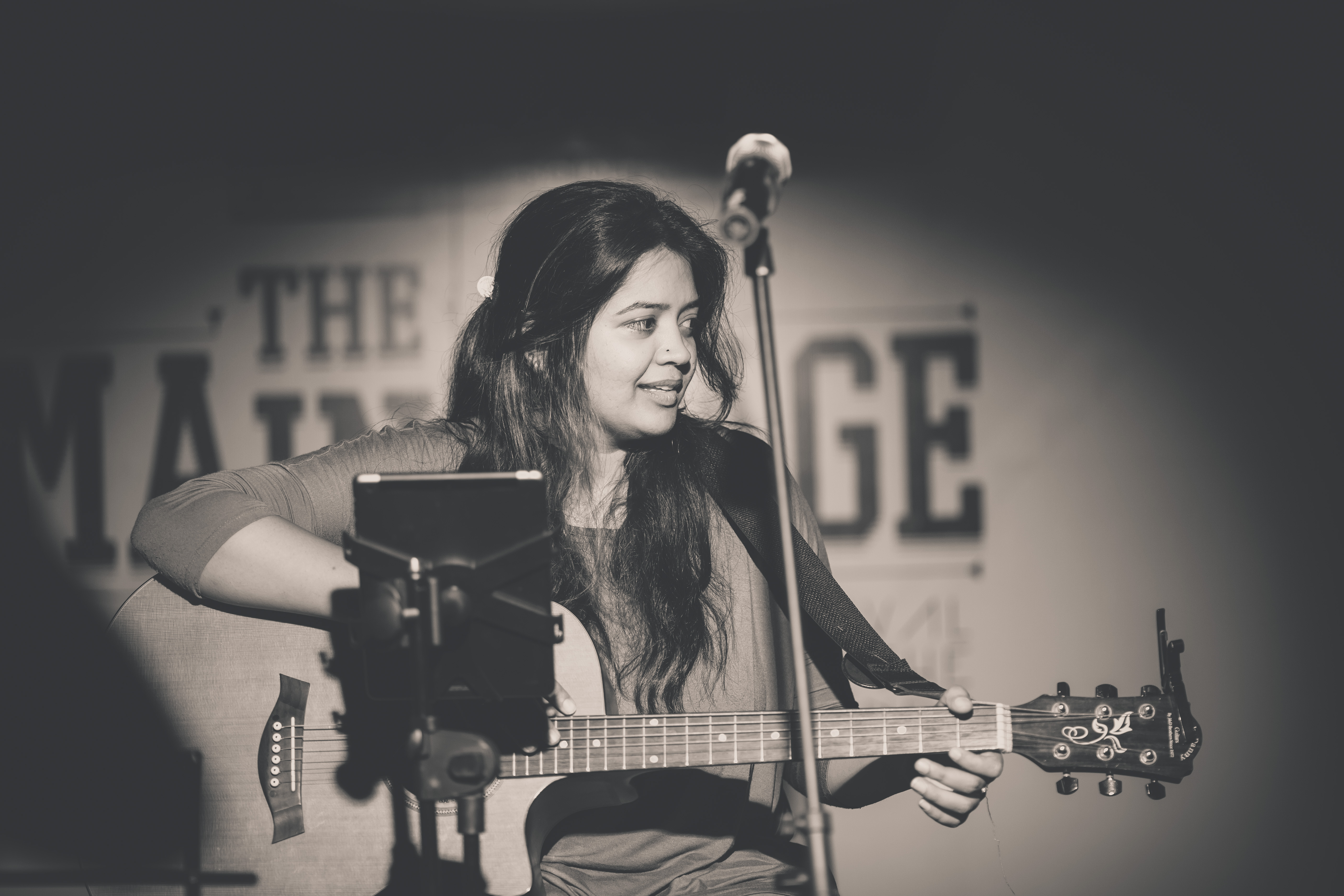
- Natarajan in 2014

Background information
- Born: July 31, 1987 (age 39)
- Origin: Chennai, Tamil Nadu, India
- Genres: Indie pop, alternative, indie folk, experimental, parody
- Occupation: Singer-Songwriter
- Years active: 2011-present
- Website: www.shilpanatarajan.com

Shilpa Natarajan is an independent acoustic singer-songwriter and a playback singer and was a music presenter on Chennai Live 104.8FM, based in Chennai, India. In 2015 she performed with the Beef Sappad Trio. She is an ATCL diploma graduate in Western Classical Music (Performance).

== Early life and education ==
As a child Natarajan attended school in Muscat. She later moved with her family to Chennai, where she attended Vidya Mandir in the neighbourhood of Mylapore and joined the school's Carnatic orchestra. Natarajan had grounding in classical Carnatic music for close to two decades. Her first Guru was her mother Maheshwari Natarajan, followed by Vijayalakshmi Subramanian and Shuba Ganesan. She currently learns from Smt. Champa Kumar. Natarajan is also a student of Western classical music.

== Career ==
Natarajan used to work with a Corporate Group based in Chennai and worked on her music during the weekends.

Her first entry into the Tamil music industry was in 2008 when she participated on a contest TV Show, Airtel Super Singer- Season 1. While she did not make it to the finals, she was invited to be a guest performer along with a lot of others from the show.

Natarajan then sang a song for a Tamil television serial- 'Puriyadha Pudhir', on Raj TV.

She entered the Tamil playback industry in 2012 with a song for a feature film titled 'Marina'. The song which she was a part of, 'Vanakkam Chennai', has received more than 2 million hits and Shilpa was invited to sing the song on Star Vijay's Super Singer.

She has sung for Disney Tamil and Nickelodeon and her voice can be heard as a singer, on both 'Nala' from Lion King and Ariel from 'Little Mermaid' (in Tamil).

She has collaborated with Vandana Srinivasan, a playback singer in Chennai and Prithvi Chandrasekar of Krimson blend on a cover of Amit Trivedi's 'Pareshaan' from Ishaqzaade.

Shilpa collaborates with Chennai's theatre company StrayFactory Entd. and has been a part of The Metroplus Theatre Festival and the Short + Sweet Festivals with Ganga at Rishikesh and Maya From Madurai.

Shilpa has been a part of Girishh Gopalakrishnan's Vidiyum Munn by singing, along with Susheela Raman and Ramshanker S., the song, 'Penne'.

She has also sung the title track, "Hi", for Vishal Chandrasekhar's 'Hi da' which is yet to release.

Natarajan began to write songs in 2011 and released her Tamil single, "Yenakku Nee Sondhama" which was produced by G.D. Prasad. Subsequently, she released an English single "Shadow On your Wall". In 2011, Shilpa collaborated with G.D. Prasad, on a bi-lingual song - "String of Shining Pearls"

In 2013, Natarajan worked with several independent musicians in Chennai and was a part of a Tamil single "Thedal", composed by Ramshanker S. That year she took part in The Hindu's Metroplus Theatre festival and 'The Fete De La Musique'.

Natarajan's next single "Dirty Little Secret", was premiered at The Metroplus Theatre Festival in August 2013, and at about that time she was featured on Zee Thamizh 's 'Isai Unplugged' show, along with a few other independent musicians, as part of a band called 'Untitled'.

In 2015, she was performing with a group called "The Beef Sapad Trio". In 2016 the group performed at a Beatles Tribute concert in Chennai.

In 2016 Natarajan performed with the Madras Musical Association choir. In 2017 she released her debut EP, Bubblewrap in two languages. The EP included 5 tracks in English and 2 in Tamil, and was produced by Naveen Samson Benjamin. Bubblewrap features musicians including Joslin Julius, Hariprasad, Vijay B., Shravan Sridhar, Biggu Chandilya, Adithi Deborah and Varun Ram Iyer. The EP is a mix of Indie pop, world, Indie-folk and other genres with tinges of other genres like alternative, carnatic and swing mixed with the music. 'Yenakku Nee Sondhama' was featured on BBC Asian Radio Network on Ashanti Omkar's on 19 March 2017. "Bubblewrap", the title track of the EP was featured on BBC Asian Radio Network on Ashanti Omkar's on 26 March 2017.

=== Beef Sappad Trio ===
Beef Sappad Trio is a parody act from the city of Chennai. The act comprises Dr. Yohan Chacko (Veal Smith), Sandeep John (TenderLoins of Punjab aka TLPJ) and Shilpa Natarajan (BarbieQ). The act write parody songs based on current affairs and are strictly humorous.

While they have written and performed many songs, some of their YouTube-released tracks are NRI song, The Biryani song, Monsoon Christmas (a song based on the Chennai floods of 2015) and most recently The Endodontist song.

== Discography ==
Song	Year	Album	Composer	Producer	Language	Credited as	Comments
Puriyadha Pudhir	2008	Puriyadha Pudhir (TV)	Unknown		Tamil		Raj TV Productions
Down the hill	2010		Varun Ravindran		English		single
Ullathin Varthaigal (Aktaa Moner Kothaa)	2012	Oviyam	Vijayanarain Rangarajan		Bengali		Short film
String of shining pearls	2012		GD Prasad	GD Prasad	English		Single
Vanakkam Vaazhavaikkum Chennai	2012	Marina	Girishh Gopalakrishnan		Tamil		
Hi (Theme song)	2013	Hi da	Vishal Chandrasekhar		Tamil		
Penne	2013	Vidiyum Munn	Girishh Gopalakrishnan		Tamil		Backing vocals
Thedal	2014		Ramshanker Sathyanarayanan		Tamil		Single
Dehamannu	2014	oka rathrilo iddaru ammayilu	Girishh Gopalakrishnan		Telugu		
Vidaraani mounam	2014	oka rathrilo iddaru ammayilu	Girishh Gopalakrishnan		Telugu		
Fly by	2016	Aagam	Vishal Chandrasekhar		Tamil		
Shoot the kuruvi	2016	Jil Jung juk	Vishal Chandrasekhar		Tamil		Backing vocals
	2016	Theri	GV Prakash			Background Vocals	Re recording
	2016	Enakku Innooru Peru Irukku	GV Prakash			Background Vocals	Re recording
	2016	Pencil	GV Prakash			Background Vocals	Re recording
Don't give up	2016	Avaladhigaram	Ramshanker Sathyanarayanan		Tamil	Singer, Lyricist	short film
Vizhi moodinen	2016		Jerard Felix		Tamil		single
Balle Vellaiya Theva	2017	Balle Vellaiya theva	Darbuka Siva		Tamil		
Vandhene	2017	Simba	Vishal Chandrasekhar		English, Tamil		
	2017	Mupparimanam	GV Prakash			Background Vocals	Re recording
Feathersword	2017	Bubblewrap	Shilpa Natarajan	Naveen Samson Benjamin	English	Singer, songwriter	EP
Lean on me	2017	Bubblewrap	Shilpa Natarajan	Naveen Samson Benjamin	English	Singer, songwriter	EP
Release me	2017	Bubblewrap	Shilpa Natarajan	Naveen Samson Benjamin	English	singer, songwriter	EP
Shadow on your wall	2017	Bubblewrap	GD Prasad	Naveen Samson Benjamin	English	Singer, Lyricist	EP
Bubblewrap	2017	Bubblewrap	Shilpa Natarajan	Naveen Samson Benjamin	English	Singer, songwriter	EP
Kadhal Kondene	2017	Bubblewrap	Naveen Samson Benjamin, Shilpa Natarajan	Naveen Samson Benjamin	Tamil	Singer, songwriter	EP
Yenakku Nee Sondhama	2017	Bubblewrap	Shilpa Natarajan	Naveen Samson Benjamin	Tamil	Singer, songwriter	EP
Yevadura	2017	Gruham	Girishh G		Telugu		
Yeh Waqt Maut Ka Hai	2017	The House Next Door	Girishh G		Hindi		
Penne	2018		Coolie		English, Tamil	Singer	Single
Sirukki	2018		Nicky M		Tamil	Vocal Arranger, Backing Vocals	Single
Yaaro Nee	2019		Shilpa Natarajan	Mervin Thomas	Tamil	Singer, Composer, Vocal Arranger	Single
	2019	Asuran	G V Prakash		Tamil	Background vocals	Re Recording
Hangover Peg	2019	Madhuram Wines	Jay Krish		Telugu	Singer	
Lockdown	2020		Shilpa Natarajan	Naveen Samson Benjamin	English	Singer, Songwriter	Single
Oshi	2020		Shilpa Natarajan	GD Prasad	English	Singer, Songwriter	Single
Oshi	2020		Shilpa Natarajan	GD Prasad	Tamil	Singer, Songwriter	Single
Haunted	2020		Shilpa Natarajan	Anjana Rajagopalan	English	Singer, Songwriter	Single
	2020	Soorarai Pottru	G V Prakash		Tamil	Background Vocals	Re Recording
Mer Song	2020		Shilpa Natarajan	Alok Merwin	English	Singer, Songwriter	Single
Day and Night	2020		Basho		English	Singer	Single
Untethered	2021		Basho		Sanskrit	Singer, Vocal Arranger	Single
Boat Song	2021		Shilpa Natarajan	Alok Merwin	English	Singer, Songwriter	Single
Jigum - Wa	2023	The Village	Girishh Gopalakrishnan		English- Korean	Singer, Lyricist	

== Animated series ==
- Biriken (Title Track)
- Sally Bollywood (Title Track)- Discovery Tamil
- Lion King 3- Disney Tamil
- Peter Pan- Disney Tamil
- Concho Bay (Animated Series) – Tamil
- Mickey & Donald have a laugh- Telugu

== Associated acts ==
- Strayfactory- Short & Sweet Festival- 'Maya from Madurai', directed by Pooja Balu, written by Naren Weiss, starring Venkatesh Harinathan, Ajay Ayyappan and Shilpa Natarajan
- Fete De La Musique 2013- With Krimson Blend @ Goethe Institut, Chennai
- StrayFactory (Experimental Theatre at Jaaga, Bangalore)
- StrayFactory (Ganga @ Rishikesh, Madras Meals- The Great Indian Blogologues)
- Banaras Shop Quartet (Ganga @ Rishikesh, The Hindu Metroplus Theatre Festival- 2012)
- Vandanam ( Pareshaan –A cover )
