= List of Tamil songs recorded by Shreya Ghoshal =

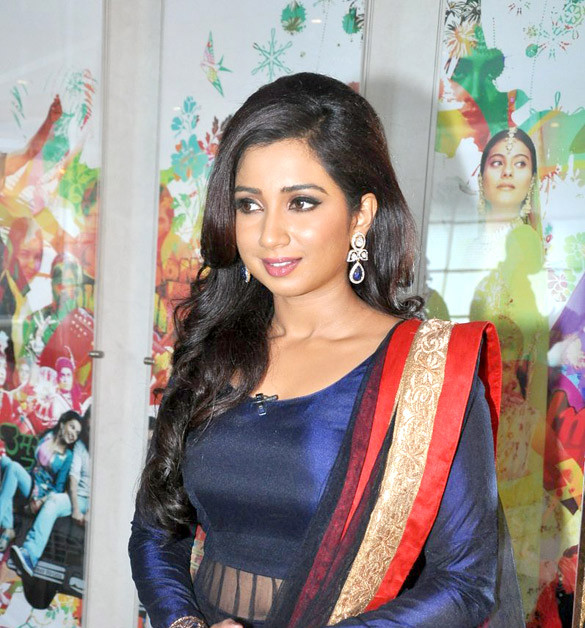
Shreya Ghoshal on the set of Indian Idol Junior

Shreya Ghoshal (born 12 March 1984) is an Indian No.1 female playback singer. She sings in Hindi, Telugu, Tamil, Malayalam, Kannada, Marathi, Gujarati, Bengali, Assamese, Nepali, Oriya, Bhojpuri, Punjabi and Tulu languages. Ghoshal's career began when she won the Sa Re Ga Ma Pa contest as an adult. Her Bollywood playback singing career began with Sanjay Leela Bhansali's Devdas, for which she received her first National Film Award for Best Female Playback Singer along with Filmfare Award for Best Female Playback Singer and Filmfare RD Burman Award for New Music Talent. Since then, she has received many other awards. Apart from playback singing, Ghoshal has appeared as a judge on several television reality shows. She performs in musical concerts around the world. She was also honored by the U.S. state of Ohio, where the governor Ted Strickland declared 26 June 2010 "Shreya Ghoshal Day". In April 2013, she was awarded with the highest honour in London by the selected members of "House of Commons of the United Kingdom". In July 2015, John Cranley, the Mayor of the City of Cincinnati also honoured her by proclaiming 24 July 2015 as "Shreya Ghoshal Day of Entertainment and Inspiration" in Cincinnati. She was also featured five times in Forbes list of the top 100 celebrities of India. In 2017, Ghoshal became the first Indian singer to have a wax statute of her in Madame Tussauds Museum, Delhi. She also debuted as producer with her first single Dhadkane Azad Hain.

== Film songs ==
She sang more than 219 songs in Tamil.

=== 2002 ===
Film	No	Song	Composer(s)	Lyricist(s)	Co-artist(s)
Album	1	"Chellame Chellam"	Karthik Raja	Na. Muthukumar	Hariharan
Solla Marandha Kadhai	2	"Gundu Malli"	Ilaiyaraaja	Ilaiyaraaja	Harish Raghavendra

=== 2003 ===
Film	No	Song	Composer(s)	Lyricist(s)	Co-artist(s)	Note(s)
Julie Ganapathi	3	"Enakku Piditha Paadal" (Female)	Ilaiyaraaja	Na. Muthukumar		
Julie Ganapathi	4	"Idhayamea Idhayamea"	Ilaiyaraaja	Mu. Metha		
Alaudin	5	"Jeeboomba"	Mani Sharma	Yugabharathi	Kalpana, Karthik	
Ragasiyamai	6	"Oduthe Oduthe"	Karthik Raja	Kabilan, Rahul Seth	Karthik Raja	
Unnai Paartha Naal Mudhal	7	"Enge Aval"	M. M. Keeravani	Pa. Vijay	M. M. Keeravani	Dubbed
Pithamagan	8	"Elangathu Veesudhe" (Duet)	Ilaiyaraaja	Palani Bharathi	Sriram Parthasarathy	
Enakku 20 Unakku 18	9	"Azhaginna Azhagi"	A. R. Rahman	Pa. Vijay	Surjo Bhattacharya	Bilingual

=== 2004 ===
Film	No	Song	Composer(s)	Lyricist(s)	Co-artist(s)
7G Rainbow Colony	10	"Ninaithu Ninaithu" (Female)	Yuvan Shankar Raja	Na. Muthukumar	
Virumaandi	11	"Sandiyare Sandiyare"	Ilaiyaraaja	Kamal Hassan	
Virumaandi	12	"Onnavida"	Ilaiyaraaja	Kamal Hassan	Kamal Haasan
Bose	13	"Nijama Nijama"	Yuvan Shankar Raja	Na. Muthukumar	KK
Neranja Manasu	14	"Paarthu Po Maamaa"	Karthik Raja	Na. Muthukumar	
Thendral	15	"Yeh Pennae"	Vidyasagar	Vairamuthu	
Vasool Raja MBBS	16	"Pathukullae Number"	Bharadwaj	Vairamuthu	KK

=== 2005 ===
Film	No	Song	Composer(s)	Lyricist(s)	Co-artist(s)
Ayya	17	"Thaamirabarani Raani"	Bharadwaj		KK
Anniyan	18	"Andangkaaka"	Harris Jayaraj	Vairamuthu	KK, Jassie Gift, Saindhavi
Adhu Oru Kana Kaalam	19	"Antha Naal Nyabagam"	Ilaiyaraaja	Vaali	Vijay Yesudas
Mumbai Express	20	"Poopoothadhu"	Ilaiyaraaja	Vaali	Sonu Nigam
Mumbai Express	21	"Yelae Nee Yetipoo"	Ilaiyaraaja	Vaali	Kamal Haasan, Ilaiyaraaja, Shaan
Oru Naal Oru Kanavu	22	"Kaatril Varum Geethame"	Ilaiyaraaja	Vaali	Hariharan, Sadhana Sargam, Bhavatharini
Oru Naal Oru Kanavu	23	"Khajiraho Kanavil"	Ilaiyaraaja	Vaali	Hariharan
Oru Naal Oru Kanavu	24	"Konjam Thira"	Ilaiyaraaja	Vaali	Sonu Nigam
Oru Naal Oru Kanavu	25	"Kaatril Varum Geethame" (Western)	Ilaiyaraaja	Vaali	Bhavatharini
Daas	26	"Saamikitte"	Yuvan Shankar Raja	Pa. Vijay	Hariharan
Sandakozhi	27	"Dhavani Potta Deepavali"	Yuvan Shankar Raja	Yugabharathi	Vijay Yesudas
Englishkaran	28	"Yaaradhu Yaaradhu"	Deva	—N/a	
February 14	29	"Ayyayo Anantha Avasthai"	Bharadwaj	Kabilan	
Kanda Naal Mudhal	30	"Panithuli"	Yuvan Shankar Raja	Thamarai	KK, Tanvi Shah
Anbe Aaruyire	31	"Thazhuvudu"	A. R. Rahman	Vaali	S. P. Balasubrahmanyam

=== 2006 ===
Film	No	Song	Composer(s)	Lyricist(s)	Co-artist(s)	Note(s)
Sillunu Oru Kaadhal	32	"Munbe Vaa En Anbe Vaa"	A. R. Rahman	Vaali	Naresh Iyer	
Sillunu Oru Kaadhal	33	"Maja Maja"	A. R. Rahman	Vaali	S. P. B. Charan	
Paruthiveeran	34	"Ayyayyo"	Yuvan Shankar Raja	Snehan	Krishnaraj, Manicka Vinayagam, Yuvan Shankar Raja	
KD	35	"Aadhivasi Naane"	Yuvan Shankar Raja	Pa. Vijay	Ranjith	
KD	36	"KD Paiya"	Yuvan Shankar Raja	Pa. Vijay	Udit Narayan	
Krrish	37	"Then Vadikkum"	Rajesh Roshan	Piraisoodan	Sonu Nigam	Dubbed
Krrish	38	"Un Pol Yarum Illai"	Rajesh Roshan	Piraisoodan	Sonu Nigam	Dubbed
Krrish	39	"Sokki Sokki"	Rajesh Roshan	Piraisoodan	Udit Narayan	Dubbed
Krrish	40	"Big Band Mix"	Rajesh Roshan	Piraisoodan	Sonu Nigam	Dubbed
Mercury Pookkal	41	"Solla Vaarthaigal Illai"	Karthik Raja	Pa. Vijay	Karthik Raja	
Murugaa	42	"Pollatha Kirukku"	Karthik Raja	Na. Muthukumar	Udit Narayan	
Thimiru	43	"Kattikko Rappa Rappa"	Yuvan Shankar Raja	Pa. Vijay	Kunal Ganjawala	
Veyil	44	"Urugudhe Maragudhe"	G. V. Prakash Kumar	Na. Muthukumar	Shankar Mahadevan	
Udhayam	45	"Oru Naal Maalaiyil"	Ilaiyaraaja	Palani Bharathi		Dubbed
Udhayam	46	"En Nenjin Ragam Enge Enge"	Ilaiyaraaja	Mu. Metha	Vijay Prakash	Dubbed

=== 2007 ===
Film	No	Song	Composer(s)	Lyricist(s)	Co-artist(s)	Note(s)
Guru	47	"Venmegam" ("Nannare")	A. R. Rahman	Vairamuthu	Udhay Mazumdar	Dubbed
Satham Podathey	48	"Entha Kuthirayil"	Yuvan Shankar Raja	Na. Muthukumar	Rahul Nambiar	
Maya Kannadi	49	"Konjam Konjam"	Ilaiyaraaja	Pa. Vijay	Karthik	
Kanna	50	"Kuyil Paadum Paattu"	Ranjit Barot	N/A		
Madurai Veeran	51	"Mudhal Mudhalaga"	Srikanth Deva	Pa. Vijay		

=== 2008 ===
Film	No	Song	Composer(s)	Lyricist(s)	Co-artist(s)
Seval	52	"Namma Ooru Nallarukku"	G. V. Prakash Kumar	Na. Muthukumar	Tippu, Manickka Vinayagam, Anuradha Sriram, Mahathi
Thoondil	53	"Uyir Vazhvadhey"	Abhishek Ray	K. S. Adhiyaman	
Inba	54	"Enn Vizhigal Meethu"	P. B. Balaji	P. B. Balaji	Naresh Iyer
Durai	55	"Unnai Mathiri"	D. Imman	—N/a	Udit Narayan
Panchamirtham	56	"Tandana Tananana"	Sundar C Babu	Vaali	
Arai En 305-il Kadavul	57	"Aavaram Poovukkum"	Vidyasagar	Kabilan	
Kuselan	58	"Chaaral"	G. V. Prakash Kumar	Kiruthiya	
Pirivom Santhippom	59	"Nenjathilae Nenjathilae"	Vidyasagar	Yugabharathi	Jairam Balasubramanian
Poi Solla Porom	60	"Oru Vaarthai"	M. G. Sreekumar	Na. Muthukumar	
Velli Thirai	61	"Thaiyyare Thaiyyare"	G. V. Prakash Kumar	—N/a	
Kuruvi	62	"Thaen Thaen Thaen"	Vidyasagar	Yugabharathi	Udit Narayan

=== 2009 ===
Film	No	Song	Composer(s)	Lyricist(s)	Co-artist(s)
Naan Avanillai 2	63	"Naangu Kangal"	D. Imman	Pa. Vijay	Javed Ali
Ananda Thandavam	64	"Poovinai"	G. V. Prakash Kumar	Vairamuthu	Srinivas
Pasanga	65	"Oru Vetkam Varudhe"	James Vasanthan	Thamarai	Naresh Iyer
Naan Kadavul	66	"Kannil Paarvai"	Ilaiyaraaja	Vaali	
Ainthaam Padai	67	"Aaradi Raakshasano"	D. Imman	Na. Muthukumar	
Naan Aval Adhu	68	"Kadhal Oru Kaatru"	R. P. Patnaik	Na. Muthukumar	Nihal
Mariyadhai	69	"Devathai Deshathil"	Vijay Antony	Pa. Vijay	Hariharan
Mariyadhai	70	"Unnai Ninaithen"	Vijay Antony	Pa. Vijay	Prasanna
Renigunta	71	"Kanne Kanmaniye"	Ganesh Raghavendra		
Vaalmiki	72	"Thendralum Maaruthu"	Ilaiyaraaja	Vaali	Shweta Mohan
Yean Ippadi Mayakkinaai?	73	"Yennavo Seidhaai"	Lakshman Ramalinga	—N/a	Kailash Kher

=== 2010 ===
Film	No	Song	Composer(s)	Lyricist(s)	Co-artist(s)	Note(s)
Vinnaithaandi Varuvaayaa	74	"Mannipaaya"	A. R. Rahman	Thamarai	A. R. Rahman	
Vinnaithaandi Varuvaayaa	75	"Aaromale" (Female)	A. R. Rahman	Kaithapram		
Rettaisuzhi	76	"Poochaandi Kannazhagi"	Karthik Raja	Annamalai	Hariharan	
Angadi Theru	77	"Un Perai Sollum"	G. V. Prakash Kumar	Na. Muthukumar	Naresh Iyer, Haricharan	
Raavanan	78	"Kalvare"	A. R. Rahman	Vairamuthu		
Thenmerku Paruvakaatru	79	"Yedi Kallachi"	N. R. Raghunanthan	Vairamuthu	Vijay Prakash	
Thillalangadi	80	"Sol Pechu"	Yuvan Shankar Raja	Na. Muthukumar	K. S. Chitra, Yuvan Shankar Raja	
Mynaa	81	"Neeyum Naanum"	D. Imman	Eknaath	Benny Dayal	
Thambikku Indha Ooru	82	"Yaaradi"	Dharan	Kabilan	Hariharan	
Prince	83	"Kenjiyadhe"	Sachin Gupta	Sameer	Sachin Gupta	Dubbed Version
Prince	84	"Kenjiyadhe" (Dance Mix)	Sachin Gupta	Sameer	Sachin Gupta	Dubbed Version
Prince	85	"Kenjiyadhe" (Hiphop Mix)	Sachin Gupta	Sameer	Sachin Gupta	Dubbed Version
Enthiran	86	"Kadhal Anukkal"	A. R. Rahman	Vairamuthu	Vijay Prakash	

=== 2011 ===
Film	No	Song	Composer(s)	Lyricist(s)	Co-artist(s)	Note(s)
Ponnar Shankar	87	"Kannadi Padithen"	Ilaiyaraaja	Palani Bharathi	Sriram Parthasarathy	
Ponnar Shankar	88	"Malar Villile"	Ilaiyaraaja	Na. Muthukumar	Darshana KT	
Ponnar Shankar	89	"Bavani Varugira"	Ilaiyaraaja	Vaali		
Ponnar Shankar	90	"Thedi Vantha Devathai"	Ilaiyaraaja	Snehan	Kunal Ganjawala	
Ilaignan	91	"Oru Nila"	Vidyasagar	Pa. Vijay	Karthik	
Seedan	92	"Munpani"	Dhina	Pa. Vijay		
Urumi	93	"Chinna Chinna"	Deepak Dev	Vairamuthu		Dubbed
Leelai	94	"Oru Killi Oru Killi"	Satish Chakravarthy	Vaali	Satish Chakravarthy	
Vandhaan Vendraan	95	"Thirandhen Thirandhen"	S. Thaman	Madhan Karky	Aalap Raju	
Vithagan	96	"Ikkuthe Kangal Vikkuthe"	Joshua Sridhar	R. Parthiban	Hariharan	
Azhagarsamiyin Kuthirai	97	"Poova Kelu"	Ilaiyaraaja	Yugabharathi	Karthik	
Appavi	98	"Rayilin Padhayil"	Joshua Sridhar	Na. Muthukumar	Hariharan	

=== 2012 ===
Film	No	Song	Composer(s)	Lyricist(s)	Co-artist(s)
Dhoni	99	"Vilayaattaa Padagotty"	Ilaiyaraaja	Na. Muthukumar	
Dhoni	100	"Chinna Kanniley"	Ilaiyaraaja	Na. Muthukumar	Naresh Iyer
Ooh La La La	101	"Unalagai Konda"	Sekhar Chandra	Egnath	
Krishnaveni Panjaalai	102	"Un Kankal" (Version l)	N. R. Raghunanthan	Thamarai	Raman Mahadevan, Ranina Reddy
Krishnaveni Panjaalai	103	"Un Kankal" (Version ll)	N. R. Raghunanthan	Thamarai	Raman Mahadevan, Ranina Reddy
Marupadiyum Oru Kadhal	104	"Kannanai Thedi"	Srikanth Deva	Vaali	
Maattrraan	105	"Nani Koni"	Harris Jayaraj	Viveka	Vijay Prakash, Karthik, Shekhinah Shawn Jazeel
Sundarapandian	106	"Rekkai Mulaithen"	N. R. Raghunanthan	Madhan Karky	G. V. Prakash Kumar
Saattai	107	"Sahaayane"	D. Imman	Yugabharathi	
Kumki	108	"Sollitaley Ava Kaadhala"	D. Imman	Yugabharathi	Ranjith
Neerparavai	109	"Para Para" (New)	N. R. Raghunanthan	Vairamuthu	
Kollaikaran	110	"Veliorae Kiliyae"	A. L. Johan	—N/a	Vijay Prakash
Ajantha	111	"Yaarum Thodatha Ondrai"	Ilaiyaraaja	—N/a	Ilaiyaraaja

=== 2013 ===
Film	No	Song	Composer(s)	Lyricist(s)	Co-artist(s)
Ameerin Aadhi Baghavan	112	"Oru Thuli Vishamaai"	Yuvan Shankar Raja	Snehan	Sharib Sabri
Ethir Neechal	113	"Velicha Poove"	Anirudh Ravichander	Vaali	Mohit Chauhan
Isakki	114	"En Chellakutty"	Srikanth Deva	Annamalai	
Desingu Raja	115	"Ammadi Ammadi"	D. Imman	Yugabharathi	
Varuthapadatha Valibar Sangam	116	"Yennada Yennada"	D. Imman	Yugabharathi	Sooraj Santhosh, Suvi Suresh
All in All Azhagu Raja	117	"Yamma Yamma"	S. Thaman	Na. Muthukumar	Sooraj Santhosh
Endrendrum Punnagai	118	"Ennai Saaithaalae"	Harris Jayaraj	Thamarai	Hariharan

=== 2014 ===
Film	No	Song	Composer(s)	Lyricist(s)	Co-artist(s)
Jilla	119	"Kandaangi Kandaangi"	D. Imman	Vairamuthu	C. Joseph Vijay
Veeram	120	"Ival Dhaana"	Devi Sri Prasad	Viveka	Sagar
Ner Ethir	121	"En Kadhale"	Satish Chakravarthy	Satish Chakravarthy	Satish Chakravarthy
Pulivaal	122	"Neelangarayil" (Version 1)	N. R. Raghunanthan	Vairamuthu	Karthik
Tenaliraman	123	"Aanazhagu"	D. Imman	Viveka	
Vallavanukku Pullum Aayudham	124	"Oh Oh Nadhigal Oda"	Siddharth Vipin	Na. Muthukumar	Naresh Iyer
Vetri Selvan	125	"Megathilae"	Mani Sharma	Madhan Karky	
Arima Nambi	126	"Neeyae Neeyae"	Sivamani	Arivumathi	
Nalanum Nandhiniyum	127	"Vaadakai Koodu"	N. R. Ragunathan	Madhan Karky	S. P. B. Charan
Sigaram Thodu	128	"Pidikkudhae"	D. Imman	Yugabharathi	Jithin Raj
Oru Oorla Rendu Raja	129	"Sundari Pennae"	D. Imman	Yugabharathi	
Mosakutty	130	"Kalla Payalae Payalae"	Ramesh Vinayakam	M. Jeevan	Haricharan
Kayal	131	"Yengirindhu Vandhaayo"	D. Imman	Yugabharathi	
Kayal	132	"Yen Aala Paakkaporaen"	D. Imman	Yugabharathi	Ranjith
Vellaikaara Durai	133	"Koodha Kaathu"	D. Imman	Vairamuthu	Haricharan
Therodum Veedhiyile	134	"Engirundu"	D. Imman	Yugabharathi	Hariharan

=== 2015 ===
Film	No	Song	Composer(s)	Lyricist(s)	Co-artist(s)	
I	135	"Pookkalae Sattru Oyivedungal"	A. R. Rahman	Madhan Karky	Haricharan	
Darling	136	"Unnale"	G. V. Prakash Kumar	Na. Muthukumar	Shankar Mahadevan	
Komban	137	"Appappa"	G. V. Prakash Kumar	Mahalingam	G. V. Prakash Kumar	
Sivappu	138	"Kodhikudhu Manasu"	N. R. Raghunanthan	Snehan	Karthik	
10 Endrathukulla	139	"Gaana Gaana"	D. Imman	Madhan Karky	Anand Aravindakshan	
Bajirao Mastani	140	"Thindaadi Poagiraen"	Sanjay Leela Bhansali	Madhan Karky		Dubbed
Bajirao Mastani	141	"Podhai Nirathai Thaa"	Sanjay Leela Bhansali	Madhan Karky	Pandit Birju Maharaj	Dubbed
Bajirao Mastani	142	"Minnaadhi Minnal"	Sanjay Leela Bhansali	Madhan Karky	Neeti Mohan	Dubbed
Mannar Valaikuda	143	"Kadhal Dhana"	Sivapragasam	Snehan		
Naan Thaan Siva	144	Yedho Yedho"	D Imman	Yugabharathi		

=== 2016 ===
Film	No	Song	Composer(s)	Lyricist(s)	Co-artist(s)
Saagasam	145	"Pudikkum"	S. Thaman	Kabilan	Shankar Mahadevan
Miruthan	146	"Mirutha Mirutha"	D. Imman	Madhan Karky	Vijay Yesudas
Vetrivel	147	"Onnapola"	D. Imman	Yugabharathi	
Pencil	148	"Kangalilae"	G. V. Prakash Kumar	Thamarai	Javed Ali
Mudinja Ivana Pudi	149	"Pothavillaye"	D. Imman	Madhan Karky	Sakthi Amaran
Thodari	150	"Pona Usuru Vanthurichu"	D. Imman	Yugabharathi	Haricharan
Thodari	151	"Oorellam Kekkude"	D. Imman	Yugabharathi	Maria Roe Vincent
Rekka	152	"Kanna Kaattu Podhum"	D. Imman	Yugabharathi	
Devi	153	"Rang Rang Rangoli"	Vishal Mishra	Na. Muthukumar	
Veera Sivaji	154	"Adada Adada"	D. Imman	Yugabharathi	Sriram Parthasarathy

=== 2017 ===
Film	No	Song	Composer(s)	Lyricist(s)	Co-artist(s)
Bogan	155	"Vaarai Vaarai"	D. Imman	Madhan Karky	Shankar Mahadevan
Paambhu Sattai	156	"Nee Uravaaga"	Ajeesh	Yugabharathi	Haricharan
Adhagappattathu Magajanangalay	157	"Yenadi"	D. Imman	Yugabharathi	Karthik
Adhagappattathu Magajanangalay	158	"Yenada" (Reprise)	D. Imman	Yugabharathi	
Gemini Ganeshanum Suruli Raajanum	159	"Aahaa Aahaa"	D. Imman	Yugabharathi	Haricharan
Rubaai	160	"Unkooda Pesathaane"	D. Imman	Yugabharathi	Anthony Daasan
Saravanan Irukka Bayamaen	161	"Marhaba Aavona"	D. Imman	Yugabharathi	Aditya Gadhvi
Puriyatha Puthir	162	"Mazhaikkulle"	Sam C. S.	Madhan Karky	Haricharan
Mersal	163	"Neethanae"	A. R. Rahman	Vivek	A. R. Rahman
Ippadai Vellum	164	"Ippadai Vellum Nichayame"	D. Imman	Arunraja Kamaraj	
Nenjil Thunivirundhal	165	"Rail Aaraaroo"	D. Imman	Yugabharathi	Pradeep Kumar
En Aaloda Seruppa Kaanom	166	"Iravil Varugira" (Female)	Ishaan Dev	Vijay Sagar	

=== 2018 ===
Film	No	Song	Composer(s)	Lyricist(s)	Co-artist(s)	Note(s)
Padmaavat	167	"Goomar Goomar Aadu"	Sanjay Leela Bhansali	Madhan Karky	Divya Kumar	Dubbed
Bhaskar Oru Rascal	168	"Amma I Love You"	Amresh Ganesh	Pa. Vijay	Baby Sreya	
Seema Raja	169	"Onnavitta" (Version 1)	D Imman	Yugabharathi	Sean Roldan	
Seema Raja	170	"Onnavitta" (Version 2)	D Imman	Yugabharathi	Sathya Prakash	
Thugs of Hindostan	171	"Suraiyya"	Ajay–Atul	Madhan Karky	Nakash Aziz	Dubbed
Thugs of Hindostan	172	"Mannaa Kaetkhudaa"	Ajay–Atul	Madhan Karky	Sunidhi Chauhan, Divya Kumar	Dubbed
Sei	173	"Nadiga"	NyX Lopez	Madhan Karky	Sonu Nigam	
Sei	174	"Nadiga" (Unplugged)	NyX Lopez	Madhan Karky	Sonu Nigam	

=== 2019 ===
Film	No	Song	Composer(s)	Lyricist(s)	Co-artist(s)	Note(s)
Viswasam	175	"Vaaney Vaaney"	D. Imman	Viveka	Hariharan	
Pettikadai	176	"Sudalamada Saamikitta"	Mariya Manohar	Na. Muthukumar		
Pettikadai	177	"Aasaiya Asaiya"	Mariya Manohar	Snehan	Sathyan	
NGK	178	"Anbe Peranbe"	Yuvan Shankar Raja	Uma Devi	Sid Sriram	
Namma Veetu Pillai	179	"Mailaanji"	D. Imman	Yugabharathi	Pradeep Kumar	
Sye Raa Narasimha Reddy	180	"Sye Raa Title Track"	Amit Trivedi	Madhan Karky	Sunidhi Chauhan	Dubbed
Dabangg 3	181	"Orey Sontham"	Sajid–Wajid	Pa. Vijay	Jubin Nautiyal	Dubbed

=== 2021 ===
Film	No	Song	Composer(s)	Lyricist(s)	Co-artist(s)
Bhoomi	182	"Kadai Kannale"	D. Imman	Thamarai	Varun Parandhaman
99 Songs	183	"Aagaaya Neelangalil"	A. R. Rahman	Thamarai	
Udanpirappe	184	"Anney Yaaranney"	D. Imman	Yugabharathi	
Udanpirappe	185	"Anney Yaaranney" (Reprise)	D. Imman	Yugabharathi	
Annaatthe	186	"Saara Kaattrae"	D. Imman	Yugabharathi	Sid Sriram
Pon Manickavel	187	"Uthira Uthira"	D. Imman	Madhan Karky	Sreekanth Hariharan
Galatta Kalyaanam	188	"Chaka Chakalathi"	A. R. Rahman	Yugabharathi	
Plan Panni Pannanum	189	"Kanave Urave"	Yuvan Shankar Raja	Niranjan Bharathi	

=== 2022 ===
Film	No	Song	Composer(s)	Lyricist(s)	Co-artist(s)
Radhe Shyam	190	"Unnaale"	Justin Prabhakaran	Madhan Karky	Anurag Kulkarni
Iravin Nizhal	191	"Maayava Thooyava"	A. R. Rahman	Madhan Karky	
The Legend	192	"Konji Konji"	Harris Jayaraj	Kabilan	KK
Poikkal Kuthirai	193	"Chellamey" (Female)	D. Imman	Madhan Karky	
Cobra	194	"Thumbi Thullal"	A. R. Rahman	Vivek, Jithin Raj	Nakul Abhyankar
Captain	195	"Kylaa"	D. Imman	Madhan Karky	Yazin Nizar
Vendhu Thanindhathu Kaadu	196	"Unna Nenachadhum"	A. R. Rahman	Thamarai	Sarthak Kalyani
Ponniyin Selvan: I	197	"Ratchasa Maamaney"	A. R. Rahman	Kabilan	Palakkad Sreeram, Mahesh Vinayakram
Kalaga Thalaivan	198	"Hey Puyale"	Arrol Corelli	Madhan Karky	Sathya Prakash

=== 2023 ===
Film	No	Song	Composer(s)	Lyricist(s)	Co-artist(s)
Thiruvin Kural	199	"Vaa Thaaragaye"	Sam C. S.	Vairamuthu	Abhijith Anilkumar
Music School	200	"Eno En Paadal"	Ilaiyaraaja	Pa. Vijay	Javed Ali
Kolai	201	"Paartha Nyabhagam"	Girishh G.	Kannadasan	
Paramporul	202	"Asaivindri"	Yuvan Shankar Raja	Madhan Karky	Yuvan Shankar Raja
Otta	203	"En Kaadal Nadiye"	M. Jayachandran	Vairamuthu	Shankar Mahadevan
Animal	204	"Theeraadha"	Manan Bhardwaj	Mohan Rajan	Yazin Nizar

=== 2024 ===
Film	No	Song	Composer(s)	Lyricist(s)	Co-artist(s)
Ranam Aram Thavarel	205	"Achu Penne"	Arrol Corelli	Vivek	
Teenz	206	"Kaanaathathai Naan"	D. Imman	R. Parthiban	D. Imman
Teenz	207	"Kaanaathathai Naan" (Duet)	D. Imman	R. Parthiban	Rohith Jayaraman
Malai	208	"Kannasara Aaraaro"	D. Imman	Yugabharathi	
Pushpa 2: The Rule	209	"Soodaana" (The Couple Song)	Devi Sri Prasad	Viveka	

=== 2025 ===
Film	No	Song	Composer(s)	Lyricist(s)	Co-artist(s)
Game Changer	210	"Lyraanaa"	S. Thaman	Vivek	Karthik
Kadhalikka Neramillai	211	"Baby Chiki Chiki"	A. R. Rahman	Krithika Nelson	
Ace	212	"Urugudhu Urugudhu"	Justin Prabhakaran	Thamarai	Kapil Kapilan
3BHK	213	"Thullum Nenjam"	Amrit Ramnath	Karthik Netha	Amrit Ramnath

=== 2026 ===
Film	No	Song	Composer(s)	Lyricist(s)	Co-artist(s)
Sattendru Maarudhu Vaanilai	214	"Sattendru Maarudhu"	Girishh Gopalakrishnan	Snehan	
Mookuthi Amman 2	215	"Kolaar Max"	Hiphop Tamizha	Vignesh Srikanth, Yuki Praveen, Madras Miran	Hiphop Tamizha, Kaushik Krish

== Non-film songs ==
=== 2007 ===
Album	No	Song	Composer(s)	Lyricist(s)	Co-artist(s)	Remarks
Megala	01	"Boomikku Mugavari"	Vijay Antony	Yugabharathi		Title song

=== 2014 ===
Album	No	Song	Composer(s)	Lyricist(s)	Co-artist(s)
Oru Kodi	02	"Oru Kodi"	Sarangan Sriranganathan		

=== 2015 ===
Album	No	Song	Composer(s)	Lyricist(s)	Co-artist(s)
Kannaadi Mazhaiyil	03	"Kannaadi Mazhaiyil"	R. N. Vasanth	Dhamayanthi	

=== 2016 ===
Album	No	Song	Composer(s)	Lyricist(s)	Co-artist(s)
Theeya	04	"Theeya"	S. Nirujan	S. Tharcicha	S. Nirujan

=== 2022 ===
Album	No	Song	Composer(s)	Lyricist(s)	Co-artist(s)
Berklee Indian Ensemble Album	05	"Sundari Pennae"	D. Imman (Recreated by Berklee Indian Ensemble)	Yugabharathi	

=== 2024 ===
Album	No	Song	Composer(s)	Lyricist(s)	Co-artist(s)
Vaan Nila (Music Video)	06	"Vaan Nila"	Hrishikesh Ranade	Satheeskanth	
