= Kolai (film) =

Tamil film

- Theatrical release poster
- Directed by: Balaji K. Kumar
- Written by: Balaji K. Kumar
- Starring: Vijay Antony; Ritika Singh; Meenakshi Chaudhary
- Cinematography: Sivakumar Vijayan
- Edited by: R. K. Selva
- Music by: Girishh G.
- Production companies: Infiniti Film Ventures; Lotus Pictures
- Distributed by: Sakthi Film Factory
- Release date: 21 July 2023
- Country: India
- Language: Tamil

Kolai (transl. Murder) is a 2023 Indian Tamil-language neo-noir mystery psychological thriller film directed by Balaji K. Kumar. The film stars Vijay Antony, Ritika Singh, and Meenakshi Chaudhary (in her Tamil debut). The film's music is composed by Girishh G. The film was released on 21 July 2023.

== Plot ==
A famous model and singer called Leila was murdered in her apartment. The case is investigated by Sandhya Mohanraj, a reliable rookie and Vinayak, a smart but traumatized detective due to personal tragedy. This case becomes personal to him because of the parallels between Leila and her daughter, whose death affected his marriage. The rest is a classic whodunit with the main suspects being Leila's boyfriend and singer Sathish, modelling friend Arjun, Bombay marketing agent Aditya Kaushik and Thief Babloo, along with flashbacks explaining their potential motives to kill her. It's later revealed that Sathish is the one who killed Leila because of Yamini, his sister who slowly died in front of him, which he took pleasure watching it. She later turned into hallucinations for him and asked to kill Leila because of her jealousy. With the case ending, the ghosts of Leila and Vinayak's daughter can finally rest.

== Cast ==
- Vijay Antony as Vinayak
- Meenakshi Chaudhary as Leila Borkar
- Ritika Singh as Sandhya Mohanraj
- Radhika Sarathkumar as Rekha
- Rajeev Shresta as Babloo
- Murali Sharma as Adithya Koushik
- Siddhartha Shankar as Sathish
- M. R. Kishore Kumar as Babloo
- John Vijay as Mansoor Ali Khan
- Arjun Chidambaram as Arjun Vasudev
- Anand as DCP Tilak Varma
- Samkit Bohra as Vinoth
- Yamuna Chinnadurai as Vinayak's wife
- Sivakumar as Constable Marudhu
- Sharmila Thapa as Mekala
- Amruth Kalam as Balram
- Kodangi Vadivel as Marimuthu
- Mamathi Chari as Dr. Kanchana
- Manasvi Kottachi as Yamini
- Prarthana as Ammu

== Production ==
Production for the film began in 2018 and entered post-production in October 2021. The film is based on true incident of Edith Thompson and Frederick Bywaters that happened in New York in 1923 and according to the director is a palimpsest of the film Another Life (2001).

== Soundtrack ==
Kolai

Soundtrack album by Girishh G.
- Released: 2023
- Recorded: 2021
- Genre: Feature film soundtrack
- Length: 21:06
- Language: Tamil

Girishh G. chronology
Super Senior Heroes (2022)	Kolai (2023)	Sattendru Maarudhu Vaanilai (2026)

Official audio
- Kolai – Full Jukebox on YouTube

The music was composed by Girishh G., collaborating with the director for the second time after Vidiyum Munn. The song "Paartha Nyabagam Illayo" was remixed and included in the film.

Track listing
No.	Title	Lyrics	Singer(s)	Length
1.	"Neerkumizho"	Karthik Netha	Sid Sriram	4:19
2.	"Yaar Nee"	Girishh G.	Anjana Rajagopalan, M. S. Krsna	4:06
3.	"Nesam Maruma"	Mohan Rajan	Anjana Rajagopalan	3:23
4.	"Kelvi Mattum Thangudhey"	Kaber Vasuki	Pradeep Kumar	4:13
5.	"Paartha Nyabagam Illayo"	Kannadasan	Shreya Ghoshal	5:05
Total length:				21:06

== Reception ==
Janani K of India Today rated with 1.5/5 stars and wrote that "In an attempt to give the murder mystery a stylised treatment, the story of 'Kolai' is compromised. Hence, there is no desired impact while watching the film". Kirubhakar Purushothaman of Indian Express rated the film with 1.5/5 stars and wrote "Kolai ends up being a plastic film that is shallow and uninteresting." A critic from The Hindu wrote that "Despite all the quirky cinematic techniques on show, Balaji Kumar's film, starring Vijay Antony and Ritika Singh, only comes across as a staple whodunit with no attempt to subvert anything". The Times of India rated the film 3/5 stars and stated as "An interesting yet slow-paced murder mystery thriller".
