= Sanjana Sarathy =

Indian actress and model

- Born: 25 July 1992 (age 34)
- Occupations: Actress, model, entrepreneur
- Years active: 2012–present

Sanjana Sarathy (born July 25, 1992) is an Indian actress and model who mainly works in the Tamil film industry. She is best known for her small role as the sister of Vijay in the 2012 Tamil film Thuppakki. She had modeled for several brands such as Cinthol, Amazon Fire TV Stick, 7UP, Pizza Hut, AVT, and Ace2Three.

== Early life and education ==
Sanjana Sarathy was born to Vijay Sarathy and actress Rajie Vijay Sarathy on 25 July 1992. She did her schooling at St. Michael's Academy, Chennai. She graduated with B.Sc. in Electronic Media at M.O.P. Vaishnav College for Women, Chennai and M.Sc. in Electronic Media at Anna University, Chennai. Finishing her studies, she started working for a news media company at Hong Kong.

== Career ==
Though Sanjana made her acting debut through Vazhakku Enn 18/9 directed by Balaji Shakthivel, she became popular through Thuppakki, playing the youngest sister of Jagdeesh, played by Vijay. She also appears in musical video, 7up Madras gig's season 2 – Avizhaai. She was praised for her performance in the 2019 ZEE5 web series Fingertip.

In 2019 Sanjana Sarathy was filmed as the female lead in Ninaivo oru paravai, alongside Hari Bhaskar (known for his YouTube channel Jump Cuts). As of October 2026, this movie is yet to be released.

Sanjana Sarathy is also a stylist running her own designer label named Chatterfox. She also performed during Yuvan Shankar Raja's 2019 US tour.

== Filmography ==
Films
Year	Title	Role	Notes
2012	Vazhakku Enn 18/9	Swetha	
2012	Thuppakki	Jagadeesh's youngest sister	
2013	Endrendrum Punnagai	Priya's sister	
2015	Vaalu	Shakthi's sister	
2019	Enai Noki Paayum Thota	Sanjana	
2021	Bro	Radha	Telugu film
TBA	Ninaivo Oru Paravai		

=== Web series ===
Year	Program Name	Role	Network	Notes
2019	Fingertip	Vidhya	Zee5	
2020	Time Enna Boss	Hannah Clarke	Amazon Prime	
2022	Mismatched	Sanskriti	Netflix	Hindi series
