= Thunivu =

2023 Indian film by H. Vinoth

- Theatrical release poster
- Directed by: H. Vinoth
- Written by: H. Vinoth
- Produced by: Boney Kapoor
- Starring: Ajith Kumar
- Cinematography: Nirav Shah
- Edited by: Vijay Velukutty
- Music by: Ghibran
- Production companies: Bayview Projects LLP; Zee Studios
- Distributed by: see below
- Release date: 11 January 2023
- Running time: 146 minutes
- Country: India
- Language: Tamil
- Budget: ₹200 crore
- Box office: est. ₹199–250 crore (Note: News18 stated that the film grossed ₹199.30 crore worldwide in its lifetime. The Times of India stated that the film made ₹220 crore. Hindu Tamil Thisai published that the film grossed ₹250 crore.)

Thunivu (transl. Fortitude, also marketed as Thunivu – No Guts No Glory) is a 2023 Indian Tamil-language heist action thriller film written and directed by H. Vinoth, and produced by Boney Kapoor under Bayview Projects LLP and Zee Studios. The film stars Ajith Kumar, alongside Manju Warrier, Samuthirakani, John Kokken, Ajay and Veera. It follows Dark Devil and his team who forms a plan and commit a bank heist to find the corporate looted people's money.

The film was officially announced in February 2022 under the tentative title AK61, as it is Ajith's 61st film in a leading role, and the official title was announced in September 2022. Principal photography commenced in April 2022 in Hyderabad along with a schedule in Chennai, which was followed up with a sporadic schedule in Thailand, and wrapped by late November 2022. The film has music composed by Ghibran, and cinematography handled by Nirav Shah and Vijay Velukutty.

Thunivu was released theatrically in the week of Pongal on 11 January 2023. It received mixed reviews from critics upon release.

== Plot ==
Radha, a dreaded gangster, and his men plan a heist at "Your Bank", one of the biggest privately owned banks in Chennai, with the support of ACP Ramachandran. They plan to rob ₹500 crores on 21 May, coinciding with the Governor's party event at his residence. On the day of the heist, Radha and his men hijack the bank, only to find it already hijacked by a mysterious man nicknamed Michael Jackson and his partner Kanmani. The commandos enter the bank but are defeated. Jackson later makes a deal with Radha to help him rob ₹5000 crores in exchange for a share of the money, which Radha and his men reluctantly agree to. When Radha finds that the bank locker contains only ₹1,510 crores, he decides to kill Jackson but is defeated.

Jackson insists that Constable Antony be the negotiator, much to Ramachandran's ire. He uses a voice changer to imitate Michael Jackson, tricking people and the media into referring to him as such. Ramachandran tries to kill Jackson with a sniper, only for him to make an explosion in a car parked near the bank using a bomb. With the events being leaked to the media, Commissioner Dayalan is called in to handle the situation. While inspecting the bank, Jackson finds explosives disguised as fire extinguishers and deduces that a third team has also entered the bank without his knowledge. The police tracks a van that Kanmani is guiding Jackson in, but Kanmani destroys it and escapes. Ramachandran sends his men to trace Kanmani, but she kills them and exposes Ramachandran's involvement in the heist to Dayalan, who interrogates him.

Ramachandran confesses that he, along with his childhood friend Shyam, the Tamil Nadu Branch Head of Your Bank, planned the heist. Ramachandran tried hiring Jackson, who goes by the name "Dark Devil", for the job, but he refused. Ramachandran later hired Radha's gang for the job, planning to kill them after the heist. Radha and his gang join and assist Dark Devil after hearing Ramachandran's confession through bugs planted on Dayalan's base. Shyam flees the police after they learn of his involvement, but Kanmani captures him. Meanwhile, Dayalan finds that Valavan was the one who wired and planted explosives in the drainage and begins to search for him. He also learns that Dark Devil and his team actually died a few months ago. Ramachandran tries to prove that Dark Devil is alive by detonating a dummy bomb, only to be killed when the bomb turns out to be a real one and explodes after the wire in it gets detached.

Dark Devil learns from Kanmani that there are ₹25,000 crores available in the bank. He tells Dayalan to arrange a meeting between him and Krish, the chairman of Your Bank. As Dark Devil deduced, the third team, revealed to be some of the bank's staff, attacked Radha and his team in the locker before assaulting Dark Devil and holding him captive. Krish arrives and reveals that he hired the third team and tells them to destroy the bank's chest with explosives with hostages inside. Krish also forces Dark Devil to reveal himself, where Dark Devil reveals that he and his teammates lived happily together like a family. After having committed a heist in Bangkok, Dark Devil's members Jijo and Achara planned to get married. They all travelled to Araku Valley to arrange their marriage and celebrate, but they were ambushed by assailants sent by Krish and Shyam, who feared that they would reveal their heist plan to others.

Jijo and Achara were killed, but Dark Devil and Kanmani managed to escape, and the killers faked their deaths for the rest of their real money. The duo reached the house of an old couple, who tended to their wounds and revealed that their son, Kavin, was an honest bank official who wanted to return the money to the people who invested in mutual funds. However, Kavin was killed by Krish, who made it look like a mob did this during a strike. Having learnt about this, Dark Devil and Kanmani decided to bring Krish and the bank officials to justice. After the revelation, Dark Devil defeats Krish and his team, forcing him on live to reveal his financial scam involving ₹25,000 crore, which was invested in mutual funds, and the atrocities committed by bank officials. Shyam, who was made to wear a bomb vest, is sent to Dayalan, where he reveals everything about the heist and Krish's involvement in it before Kanmani's phone call kills him.

Dark Devil also brings mutual funds chairman Harsha, who Kanmani abducted at gunpoint, and Sunil Dutta, who was abducted from Mauritius by Dark Devil's men and was also responsible for stealing data from the NSE backup server of the Indian Stock Exchange. Sunil confesses that he invested in 10 of Krish's companies and reveals that the ₹30,000 crore is in the bank's secret chest locker. With the help of a mole in the media, Krish falsely frames Dark Devil and his team as terrorists and cuts the live telecast. Dayalan learns from Rajesh that everyone in the bank except Krish will be killed before the commandos arrive to take control of the situation, and that Dayalan is suspended. At the bank, Dark Devil opens the secret locker with the help of Radha and his men, only to find that the money is counterfeit. Dark Devil locks Krish, Sunil, and Harsha in the secret locker before Krish reveals that the money is stacked in 25 of the 1500 containers on his ship, which he discreetly records on video. The commandos opened fire, with the bank severely damaged.

Krish, Sunil, and Harsha are killed in the secret locker by an explosive. Kanmani arrives in a fire truck stuffed with RDX and threatens to detonate them unless the hostages are released, forcing the commandos to cease fire. She, along with Dark Devil, wearing masks, escapes with the help of the public and reaches a boat, planning to escape by sea, while Radha and his gang also escape in the ensuing chaos. A chase ensues, during which Dark Devil, Kanmani, and the rest of their team shoot the commandos and coast guards, using an M2 Browning. However, they get shot and fall into the sea. Later, the media broadcasts the video that Dark Devil discreetly recorded, and Dayalan's suspension is revoked.

A few months later, Dark Devil and Kanmani fake their deaths and escape using sea scooters, reaching their boat, settling in international waters. Dayalan and his team board a helicopter to the ship, where they find the ₹25,000 crore.

== Cast ==
- Ajith Kumar as Dark Devil
- Manju Warrier as Kanmani
- Samuthirakani as Commissioner Dayalan
- John Kokken as Krish
- Ajay Kumar as ACP Ramachandran
- Veera as Radha
- G. M. Sundar as Muthazhagan
- Prem Kumar as Prem
- Darshan as Kavin
- Mahanadi Shankar as Constable Antony (Anto)
- Bagavathi Perumal as Inspector Rajesh
- Mohana Sundaram as Mai Pa
- Bala Saravanan as Press Reporter
- Chirag Jani as Harsha
- Rituraj Singh as Sunil Dutta
- Sijoy Varghese as Sam Jacob
- Amir as Jijo
- Pavani Reddy as Achara
- Ciby Bhuvana Chandran as Ravi
- Birla Bose as Thirunavukarasu
- Valavan as Valavan
- Mamathi Chari as Channel Head
- A. L. Azhagappan as Chief Minister of Tamil Nadu
- K. Rajan as Opposition Leader
- Kumar Natarajan as Central Minister
- G. P. Muthu as Commoner
- Kaalishwaran as Kavin's father
- Padma as Kavin's mother
- Nalinikanth as Customer

== Production ==
=== Development ===
Ajith Kumar's 60th film, Valimai (2022) under the direction of H. Vinoth and produced by Boney Kapoor, faced several production delays due to the COVID-19 pandemic. In March 2021, Kapoor hinted on collaborating for the actor's 61st film and Vinoth directing the film, which would mark their third consecutive collaboration following Nerkonda Paarvai (2019) and Valimai, which was later confirmed in September 2021. Sources reported that Kapoor suffered financial problems following the protracted production of Valimai, which necessitated a third collaboration between the actor and director, though he denied such claims in an interview before Valimai's release. Initially Ajith planned for collaborating with a different director, but agreed to join with Vinoth after watching the rough edit of Valimai.

On 15 February 2022, the project was officially announced under the working title AK 61, and pre-production works for the film began the same time. Kapoor also shared a still featuring Ajith in a long beard with coolers in a monochrome format, which would be the looks for his film. As a part of the film's shoot, a huge set resembling Mount Road in Chennai would be erected at Ramoji Film City in Hyderabad, where much of the film's shoot would take place. Vinoth recruited cinematographer Nirav Shah and editor Vijay Velukutty, who worked on Valimai, while music composer Ghibran and art director Milan, were signed on. Supreme Sundar was hired to choreograph the action sequences. The official title Thunivu was announced on 21 September 2022.

In December 2022, Vinoth revealed in an interview to The Times of India, saying in response that the film is a heist film, that the film blends multiple genres and cannot be slotted under the particular genre. Vinoth said he narrated a single scene, written for a planned low-budget film, to Ajith; after he showed an interest in signing the film, Vinoth increased the scale of the project. Vinoth elaborated, "The film is about money. It is something that we use on a daily basis, but if someone asks us what money is, how currency operates and what reference money is, we'd hardly have an idea". He further recalled that Ajith does not play a dual role in the film, as was speculated, and his character will be kept under wraps.

=== Casting ===
Thunivu was reported to be trying to cast actors from "across the industry" in the film. In May 2022, a month after filming began, Manju Warrier was signed as the lead actress, her second Tamil film after Asuran (2019), though she would not play Ajith's love interest. Vinoth wanted to cast an actress closer to Ajith's age and chose Warrier as he felt that "audiences would expect a strong character from her as she's a terrific performer. Since she's done many performance-oriented roles, we decided to show a different facet of hers by having her do action, which would make her character feel fresh."

The same month, John Kokken, and Veera signed the film, along with Samuthirakani and Mahanadi Shankar, who collaborates with Ajith after 20 years since Dheena (2001). In June 2022, Nayana Sai was cast in for the film, and the following month, Telugu actor Ajay, and Mamathi Chari joined the film, and shot few key sequences. Shaam was approached to play a negative role, but declined due to scheduling conflicts with Varisu. Chirag Jani also play an important role, which he described as his "biggest role in Tamil" after Kaappaan (2019). Jani said his character is a businessman with grey shades, "not a typical villain role" and would have "a very classy, corporate look". Bigg Boss 6 contestant GP Muthu's presence in the film was confirmed on 23 December 2022.

=== Filming ===
The film was expected to begin filming on mid-March 2022, but was delayed due to extensive pre-production. Principal photography began on 11 April 2022 at Hyderabad, where few scenes had been shot without Ajith. The actor later joined the film's shoot in 22 April. The following month, Kapoor said in an interview that 36 days of film's shooting has been completed and the film would be wrapped entirely during July–August 2022. A unit from the film had shot few sequences from Mount Road in Chennai, instead of the set production in Hyderabad. On 10 June 2022, the film's first schedule was completed, and the team later took a schedule break as Ajith went on a family vacation to United Kingdom. Few sequences, without the actor had been shot, with Manju Warrier also joining.

In July 2022, Vinoth shot few action sequences at the outskirts of Vandalur, Chennai, where a bridge sequence with a group of fighters being shot. In July 2022, fans leaked stills of the bank set from the film, which had resembled a "french style building". The second schedule began on 12 August 2022, which was intended to be shot at Pune, but was later shifted to Chennai. However, it was again shifted to Visakhapatnam, Ajith also returned to the country and filmed here. This schedule was completed on 24 August 2022, and the team returned to Hyderabad for filming crucial sequences which was completed early September.

The final shooting schedule was intended to take place in Bangkok on 15 September 2022, where an action sequence is intended to be shot within 21 days. But the shooting took place on 25 September 2022, and was wrapped by 12 October. On 16 October, patchwork shooting for the film progressed in Chennai, where a body double of Ajith had shot for the robbery sequence. Ajith later joined the shooting six days later. In mid-November, it was reported that the most of filming had been wrapped, except for two songs in the film, which would be completed within the end of the month. On 11 November 2022, the makers shot for a promotional song titled "Kasethan Kadavulada" at Gokulam Studios in Chennai, and another song "Chilla Chilla" was shot at the same set few days later. Principal photography wrapped up on 30 November.

In an interview to regional media, stunt choreographer Supreme Sundar had choreographed for a 360-degree action sequence which was shot in 32 seconds. Sundar also said that Ajith was given the chance to perform other stunts as even a small mistake would require to reshoot from the beginning, but was very cooperative and enthusiastic to perform the sequence. He revealed that the first four takes did not go well, but with few minor changes, Ajith was able to perform the stunt, with the shot being perfect in the 13th take.

=== Post-production ===
Post-production works began simultaneously on late-October, with Warrier and Ajith dubbing for their portions by November 2022. John Kokken also dubbed for his portions in Tamil, which was the first time he did, as was Chirag Jani, who was assisted by Ajith in dubbing for the film, translating it in Hindi and English, due to his fluency in the languages. In late December, the final edit of the film, was sent to the Central Board of Film Certification for the censoring process.

== Music ==
Thunivu

Soundtrack album by Ghibran
- Released: 8 February 2023
- Recorded: 2022
- Genre: Feature film soundtrack
- Length: 10:11
- Language: Tamil
- Label: Zee Music South
- Producer: Ghibran

Ghibran chronology
Amigos (2023)	Thunivu (2023)	Hunt (2023)
External audio
- Thunivu - Full Album on YouTube

Singles from Thunivu
- 1. "Chilla Chilla" Released: 9 December 2022; 2. "Kasethan Kadavulada" Released: 18 December 2022; 3. "Gangstaa" Released: 25 December 2022

The music of the film is composed by Ghibran, in his 50th film as a composer and marking his second collaboration with Ajith Kumar and Boney Kapoor after scoring Valimai (2022). The first single titled "Chilla Chilla" was released on 9 December 2022, and the second single "Kasethan Kadavulada" on 18 December. Manju Warrier provided vocals only for the video version of the song. The third single "Gangstaa" was released on 25 December.

Track listing
No.	Title	Lyrics	Artist(s)	Length
1.	"Chilla Chilla"	Vaisagh	Anirudh Ravichander, Vaisagh, Ghibran	3:42
2.	"Kasethan Kadavulada"	Vaisagh	Vaisagh, Manju Warrier, Ghibran	3:08
3.	"Gangstaa"	Viveka, Shabir	Shabir, Ghibran	3:21
Total length:				10:11

=== Background score ===
The film score is composed by Ghibran. The official background score was released on 10 February 2023.

Thunivu (Original Background Score)
No.	Title	Length
1.	"AK"	0:43
2.	"This Heist is Mine"	2:24
3.	"A Man on a Mission"	1:28
4.	"No Guts No Glory"	1:29
5.	"Ayoggiyargalin Aattam"	2:56
6.	"Kanmani Theme"	2:33
7.	"Thala Sedharidum"	1:27
8.	"The Escape Theme"	2:01
9.	"Anthony Meme Theme — Unused"	0:35
10.	"Devil in the Vault"	1:40
11.	"Madness"	1:05
12.	"Chilla on a Chair"	0:29
13.	"The Flash Boys"	2:27
14.	"Villain Da"	0:53
15.	"Yenn Ondrai Azhuthavum"	1:26
16.	"Adi Sara Vedi"	1:44
17.	"Power Office Power"	1:48
18.	"The First Heist"	2:23
19.	"The Submarine"	1:31
20.	"Kanmani's Last Wish"	1:20
21.	"The Scam"	1:11
22.	"Hopeless Whistleblower"	2:37
23.	"AC's Plan Turmoils"	1:09
24.	"Kiss Rule"	0:43
25.	"The Chairman's Plan"	2:06
26.	"Queries of a Common Man"	1:31
27.	"The Your Bank Massacre"	1:40
28.	"Nambara Maariye Illa"	1:20
29.	"The Commandos"	1:21
30.	"Commissioner Arrives"	1:11
31.	"True Injustice"	2:48
32.	"Harsha Show'ku Varavum"	1:05
33.	"Wa*** Seirom"	6:46
Total length:		58:00

== Marketing ==
Overseas promotions for the film began on late-December 2022. On 26 December 2022, skydiving promotions of the film were held in Dubai, with the film's posters being unveiled by the skydiving crew members making it the second Tamil film to do so after 2.0 (2018). The makers then announced the release date for the trailer of the film as 31 December 2022 on the eve of New Year. It was reported that the film's trailer will be screened at Burj Khalifa in Dubai and in New York's Times Square. Within 24 hours of its premiere on YouTube, the trailer received over 25 million views.

== Release ==
=== Theatrical ===
Thunivu was released theatrically on 11 January 2023 in the week of Pongal, clashing with Varisu.

=== Pre-release business ===
It was reported that the satellite and digital distribution rights of the film were sold for ₹20 crore (US$2.1 million) and ₹65 crore (US$6.7 million) respectively. Red Giant Movies acquiring the Tamil Nadu theatrical rights for ₹60 crore (US$6.2 million). The Andhra Pradesh and Telangana theatrical rights were sold at a very low price of over ₹3 crore (US$310,000) crores. The Karnataka and Kerala theatrical rights were sold for over ₹3.6 crore (US$370,000) and ₹2.5 crore (US$260,000) respectively. The Hindi-dubbing rights of the film were sold for ₹25 crore (US$2.6 million) crores. Overseas theatrical rights were sold to ₹14 crore (US$1.5 million).

=== Distribution ===
The Tamil Nadu distribution rights of the film were acquired by Red Giant Movies, through profit-sharing basis. Romeo Pictures is also responsible for co-distributing the film in Tamil Nadu. Lyca Productions acquired the overseas distribution rights, which would distribute the film through their sub-distributors: Sarigama Cinemas (United States), Boleyn Cinemas (United Kingdom and Europe), Phars Film (Middle East), Malik Streams (Malaysia and Singapore), Vansan Movies (Australia and New Zealand), York Cinemas (Canada). The Andhra Pradesh and Telangana distribution rights of the film were acquired by Dil Raju under the banner Radha Krishna Entertainments and Ivy Productions.

=== Home media ===
The post-theatrical streaming rights of the film were sold to Netflix, while the satellite rights of the film were sold to Kalaignar TV. The film was premiered on Netflix from 8 February 2023, in addition to Tamil, it is also available in Telugu, Malayalam, Kannada, and Hindi.

== Reception ==
Thunivu received mixed reviews from critics. On the review aggregator website Rotten Tomatoes, 44% of 9 critics' reviews are positive, with an average rating of 5.8/10.

M. Suganth of The Times of India gave 3 out of 5 stars and wrote "Despite raising many relevant questions about the operations of our financial institutions and the impact that has on the common man, the film’s refusal to show it as something that affected the protagonist directly makes it impossible to root for him whole-heartedly. And when the film turns into a logic-defying chase on the sea, we begin to wonder if guts alone can be enough for glory." Janani K of India Today gave the film 3 out of 5 and wrote "Overall, Thunivu is a film that brings back the Ajith we have enjoyed in the past. With an excellent premise, the film has a lot to offer. But, remember to look past the flaws."

Haricharan Pudipeddi of Hindustan Times wrote "With each collaboration, H Vinoth has managed to bring out something refreshing with respect to Ajith’s performance. In Thunivu, he doesn’t have any qualms in making Ajith play a mastermind criminal with no ethics. Manju Warrier, too, gets a role that she has so much fun with. The film does fumble towards the end, when the action feels underwhelming but the film has enough moments to keep one invested. Ghibran’s background score suits the mood of the film really well and so were his songs." Arvind V of Pinkvilla gave 3 out of 5 stars and wrote "Thunivu is somewhat of a noisy film with a few superfluous and many convenient ideas. Yet, it works because of its lead man, larger-than-life action, and some plot points. The amount of effort shown by the action department is praiseworthy. This one also blends relatable issues without being too edgy in its treatment. The entertainment quotient gets the upper hand in some stretches, while pure action dominates otherwise. The gun battles could have been edited inventively so that the impact is strong."

Princy Alexandar of Onmanorama wrote "The message is also definitely an eye-opener for banks and corporates, but is not striking enough as the aim seems to be only to appease Ajith fans. The twists and turns in Thunivu ensure the film is engaging. However, the drawback is the treatment and the plot’s failure to strike a balance."

Thinkal Menon of OTT Play gave 3 out of 5 stars and wrote "Thunivu, undoubtedly, is a treat for Ajith fans and action lovers. An engaging second half and more focus on the message Vinoth intended to convey would have made the film a thorough entertainer." Sudhir Srinivasan of Cinema Express gave the film 3 out of 5 stars and wrote "How much you like Thunivu depends on how much you are willing to forgive its weak portions—and of course, how much you have missed seeing Ajith Kumar enjoy breaking bad."

== Box office ==
In its 5-day weekend, the film reportedly grossed over ₹150 crore (US$16 million) worldwide.
