= Balaji K. Kumar =

Indian film director

- Occupation: Film director
- Years active: 2004–present

Balaji K. Kumar is an Indian film director, who has worked on Tamil and English-language films.

== Early life and career ==
Kumar studied cinematography at UCLAand worked as a storyboard consultant for advertising firms. He directed the English-language film Twelve Twisted Tricks. Reviewing the film's script in 2001, Devin Farci of Chud.com wrote that the film "is a complex, exciting script that creates its own strange world where the entire 20th century is smashed together in a post-ironic noir tale of guys, guns, and gambles". The film's trailer premiered at the Cannes Film Festival in 2002. The trailer won Best Trailer – No Movie award in 2003, and the film was officially released the following year.

His next film was the independent horror film 9 Lives of Mara starring Pollyanna McIntosh, Chad Donella, Patrick Bauchau, Troy Gentile, and Jennifer Gimenez, which premiered in film festivals such as the Fright Night Film Fest from 2005 to 2007. Sam Sloan of Slice of SciFi wrote that "Kumar keeps us thinking long after the lights come up with this slick and haunting Oedipal tale with Lovecraftian elements".

He then debuted in Tamil with Vidiyum Munn (2013). The film released to critical acclaim despite being a box office failure. A critic wrote that "Director Balaji undoubtedly is at the top of his game". According to Balaji Kumar, "We have made Vidiyum Munn like a new generation film for a matured audience. The film deals with an universal issue". After working on scripts, he returned after ten years with Kolai (2023), which is a based on a real incident that took place in New York in 1923.

== Filmography ==
Year	Film	Language	Notes
2004	Twelve Twisted Tricks	English	
2007	9 Lives of Mara	English	Also producer; Won–2008 Tabloid Witch Award for Best Horror Film
2013	Vidiyum Munn	Tamil	Inspired by London to Brighton
2023	Kolai	Tamil	
