= Happy Journey (2014 Marathi film) =

2014 film directed by Sachin Kundalkar

- Theatrical release poster
- Directed by: Sachin Kundalkar
- Screenplay by: Sachin Kundalkar
- Produced by: Sanjay Chhabria
- Starring: Atul Kulkarni; Priya Bapat
- Cinematography: Rangarajan Ramabadran
- Edited by: Jayant Jathar; Nitesh Rathod
- Music by: Karan Kulkarni
- Production company: Everest Entertainment
- Release date: 28 November 2014
- Running time: 129 minutes
- Country: India
- Language: Marathi
- Box office: ₹4 crore (US$420,000)

Happy Journey is a 2014 Indian Marathi-language drama film directed by Sachin Kundalkar and produced by Sanjay Chhabria under the banner of Everest Entertainment. It stars Atul Kulkarni and Priya Bapat in the lead roles. It was remade in Malayalam in 2018 as Koode, with Prithviraj Sukumaran, Nazriya Nazim and Parvathy Thiruvothu in lead roles. This film was remade in Telugu as #Bro starring Naveen Chandra and Avika Gor in lead roles.

== Plot ==
The story is about the love between a brother and a sister. A sister who has hardly seen her brother in her life. So after her death, her ghost shares her experiences and helps her brother and finally disappears.

== Cast ==
- Atul Kulkarni as Niranjan
- Pallavi Subhash as Alice
- Priya Bapat as Janaki
- Chitra Palekar as Ansuya (Alice's mother)
- Madhav Abhyankar as Niranjan & Janaki's father
- Shiv Kumar Subramaniam as Andrew (Alice's father)
- Siddharth Menon as Ajinkya
- Suhita Thatte as Janaki's mother

== Music ==
Happy Journey

Soundtrack album by Karan Kulkarni
- Released: 8 August 2014
- Genre: Feature film soundtrack
- Length: 12:50
- Label: Everest Entertainment

Karan Kulkarni chronology
That Day After Everyday (2013)	Happy Journey (2014)

The soundtrack of the film has been given by Karan Kulkarni and lyrics have been penned by Omkar Kulkarni, Kshitij Patwardhan and Tejas Modak. The first single "Fresh", sung by Shalmali Kholgade released on 8 July 2014.

All music is composed by Karan Kulkarni.

Happy Journey (Original Motion Picture Soundtrack)
No.	Title	Lyrics	Singer(s)	Length
1.	"Fresh"	Omkar Kulkarni	Shalmali Kholgade	3:57
2.	"Ka Saang Na"	Kshitij Patwardhan	Shreya Ghoshal, Swapnil Bandodkar	5:00
3.	"Aakash Jhale" (Lullaby)	Tejas Modak	Shalmali Kholgade	3:53
Total length:				12:50

== Adaptation ==
It was officially adapted into Malayalam as Koode, directed by Anjali Menon and starring Prithviraj Sukumaran, Nazriya Nazim, and Parvathy. It was also remade in Telugu as #BRO starring Naveen Chandra which got released on Sony Liv.
