= Alexander Babu =

Indian stand-up comedian and actor

- Born: Alexander Babu Arulanthu; 18 December 1975 (age 50); Andavoorani, Ramanathapuram district, Tamil Nadu
- Occupations: Comedian, actor, YouTuber
- Years active: 2014 - present
- Spouse: Sumitha Mohan
- Children: Aadhavan Jude and Varun Simeon Alexander
- Website: http://alexanderbabu.com/

Alexander Babu Arulanthu is an Indian stand-up comedian, singer, yoga instructor, musician and actor.

In 2014, Alexander Babu left his corporate job as a software engineer to focus on stand-up comedy and theater shows. He has toured the United States, Dubai, Singapore, Malaysia, United Kingdom, Kuwait and Australia for his performances. In 2019 he produced his 120-minute English-Tamil stand-up-musical special, Alex in Wonderland for Amazon Prime.

== Personal life ==
Alexander Babu was born and brought up in a small village called Andavoorani in Ramanathapuram district, Tamil Nadu in a Catholic family. He studied engineering in College of engineering Guindy in Chennai, studied his master's degree in the United States and worked as a software engineer at Amazon in Seattle. He began his training as a Carnatic vocalist when he was in the United States.

== Career ==
Alexander Babu started his stand-up comedy career after leaving his corporate job as a software-engineer. During his early life in stand-up comedy he worked in the South India-focused comedy movement Evam Stand-Up Tamasha During July 2017, he began his musical stand-up act, Alex in Wonderland which combines music, storytelling and stand-up and earned him numerous accolades. He performed 115 shows of Alex in Wonderland worldwide after ending it in 2019 and it is now an Amazon Prime special He is popular in YouTube for his stand-up comedy performances; his videos have gained him millions of views and has more than 1 million subscribers as of April 2020.

== Filmography ==
=== Actor ===
==== Films ====
- All films are in Tamil.

Key
†	Denotes films that have not yet been released

Year	Film	Role	Notes
2019	Adadae		
2019	Alex in Wonderland	Himself	Television film
2020	Maara	Thief	Amazon Prime Video release
2025	Alexperience	Himself	Stage show and OTT Anba TV

==== Web series ====
Year	Program Name	Role	Network	Notes
2020	Time Enna Boss	Santhosam	Amazon Prime	

=== Singer ===
Year	Film	Song	Notes
2020	Dharala Prabhu	"Rasa Mavan"	
2021	Aelay	"Muthukutti Settai"	
2024	Captain Miller	"Koranaaru"	
