= Bro (2021 film) =

2021 Indian family drama film

- Release poster
- Directed by: Karthik Thupurani
- Screenplay by: Karthik Thupurani
- Story by: Sachin Kundalkar
- Based on: Happy Journey by Sachin Kundalkar
- Produced by: JJR Ravichand
- Starring: Naveen Chandra; Avika Gor; Sai Ronak; Sanjana Sarathy
- Cinematography: Azeem Mohammad
- Edited by: Viplav Nyshadam
- Music by: Shekar Chandra
- Production companies: JJR Entertainments; Mango Mass Media
- Distributed by: SonyLIV
- Release date: 26 November 2021
- Country: India
- Language: Telugu

#Bro is a 2021 Indian Telugu-language family drama film directed by Karthik Thupurani. The film stars Naveen Chandra, Avika Gor, Sai Ronak and Sanjana Sarathy. It is an adaptation of the 2014 Marathi film Happy Journey.

== Plot ==
When his younger sister Subbu dies, Madhav, who went abroad in his teens to work for his sister's medical expenses, returns home. But he discovers his sister speaking to him, and he spends time with her. Subbu tells him about her lover, Savyasachi, and she helps Madhav unite with his lover, Radha.

== Cast ==
- Naveen Chandra as Madhav
- Avika Gor as Subhadra a.k.a. Subbu
- Sai Ronak as Savyasachi
- Sanjana Sarathy as Radha
- Kalpa Latha
- Devi Prasad
- Sri Lakshmi

== Production ==
The film was produced by JJR Entertainments and Mango Mass Media. The cinematography of the film was done by Azeem Mohammad, and the editing of the film was done by Viplav Nyshadam. The trailer for the film was released on 20 November 2021.

== Music ==
The film's soundtrack album and background score were composed by Shekar Chandra.

Bro

Soundtrack album by Shekar Chandra
- Released: 2021
- Recorded: 2021
- Genre: Feature film soundtrack
- Length: 19:49
- Language: Telugu
- Label: Saregama Telugu
- Producer: Shekar Chandra

Shekar Chandra chronology
Valayam (2020)	Bro (2021)	Atithi Devo Bhava (2022)

Track listing
No.	Title	Lyrics	Singer(s)	Length
1.	"Annayya"	Bhaskarabhatla	Sunitha Upadrashta	4:17
2.	"Chellemma"	Bhaskarabhatla	Ritesh G Rao	4:24
3.	"Oohalo"	Bhaskarabhatla	Shanmukha Bharadwaj, Hrithika Aanandi	3:40
4.	"Anandham"	Bhaskarabhatla	Yazin Nizar, Vishnupriya Ravi	3:48
5.	"Oh My Dear Brother"	Bhaskarabhatla	Nutana Mohan	3:40
Total length:				19:49

== Release ==
The film was released on SonyLIV on 26 November 2021.

== Reception ==
Neeshita Nyayapati of The Times of India gave it 3 out of 5 stars and wrote, "#Bro is a feel-good movie that falters between being breezy and a tad bit melodramatic." Siby Jeyya of the India Herald gave the film a mixed review, stating, "Even though this is a predictable family melodrama, this might be a feel good movie to catch up on this weekend!"

Srivathsan Nadadhur of OTTplay gave it 2.5 out of 5 stars and wrote, "Naveen Chandra and Devi Prasad hold fort with assuring performances that help us look beyond the jerky screenplay. A subtler performance from Avika Gor could've done the trick." Pavani of Telugu Film Nagar gave a review, stating, "It is an emotional, feel-good entertainer, and it shows the emotional bonding between the siblings."

Manjima Das of Leisure Byte gave it 2.5 out of 5 stars and wrote, "#BRO movie is a different style of film for the Telegu OTT space, but given the fact that it is the remake that has happened multiple times over different languages, it loses its charm."
