= John Kokken =

Indian actor

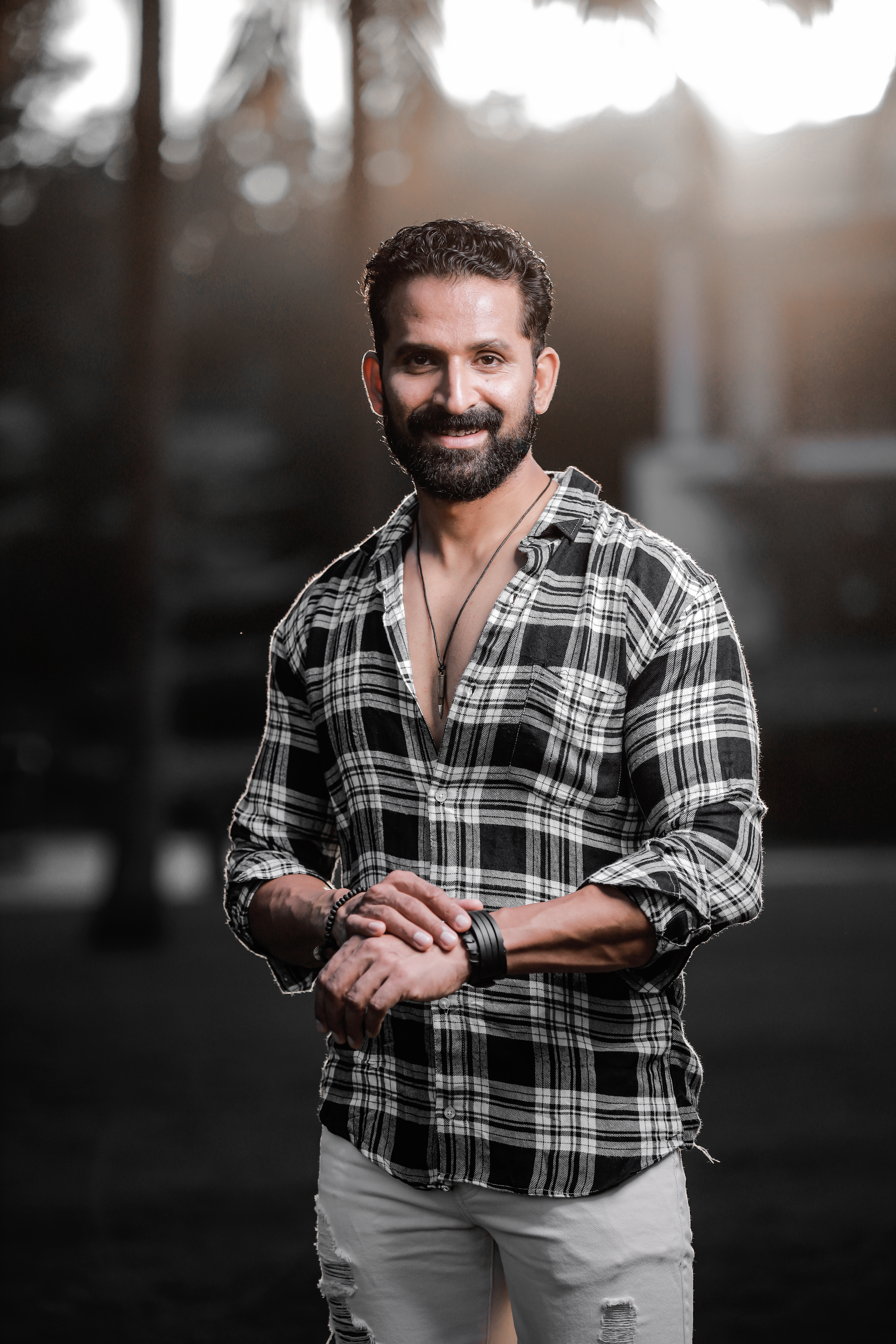
- Born: Anish John Kokken; 27 March 1981 (age 45); Thrissur, Kerala, India
- Occupation: Actor
- Years active: 2006–present
- Spouses: Meera Vasudevan (m. 2012; div. 2016); Pooja Ramachandran (m. 2019)
- Children: 2

Anish John Kokken is an Indian actor and former model who has appeared in Telugu, Kannada, Tamil, and Malayalam films, playing predominantly antagonistic roles. He earned recognition for his role as Vembuli in the 2021 Tamil film Sarpatta Parambarai.

== Early life ==
Anish John Kokken was born into a Malayali family in Thrissur, Kerala, but was raised in Mumbai, Maharashtra. His father John was a school vice principal, and his mother was a nurse. He has two brothers. Kokken studied BSE at St. Xavier's College, Mumbai before switching to hotel management, which he did for two years.

== Career ==
Kokken began his career as a model, and after finishing in the last ten in the Gladrags 2005 contest, he chose to pursue a career as an actor. He appeared in his first film, Kalabham during 2006, and subsequently continued to play supporting roles across the Tamil, Telugu, Kannada and Malayalam film industries. In 2010 he was introduced to Kannada cinema by the famous actor cum producer Puneeth Rajkumar During this period, he notably portrayed antagonistic roles in films including Yevadu (2014), Baahubali: The Beginning, (2015) and the K.G.F film series. In 2021, Kokken notably appeared as boxer Vembuli in Pa. Ranjith's period drama Sarpatta Parambarai, before portraying the main antagonist in Thunivu (2023). Later that year, he appeared in the streaming television series The Village and The Freelancer.

== Personal life ==
From 2012 to 2016, Kokken was married to actress Meera Vasudevan. Together, the couple have a son. In April 2019, he married actress Pooja Ramachandran. They have a son, who was born in April 2023.

== Filmography ==
=== Film ===
List of John Kokken film credits
Year	Film	Role	Language	Notes
2006	Kalabham	Jihadi terrorist	Malayalam	
2009	Love In Singapore	Rahul	Malayalam	
2009	IG	Yasser Shah	Malayalam	
2010	Alexander The Great	Moneylender	Malayalam	
2010	Shikkar	Thambi Muthalali	Malayalam	
2010	Prithvi	Nagendra Nayak	Kannada	
2010	Shourya	Vijayendra Varma's son	Kannada	
2010	Mylari	Anitha's brother	Kannada	
2010	Don Seenu	Praveen Duggal	Telugu	
2010	Shourya		Kannada	
2011	Osthe	Local Don	Tamil	
2011	Teen Maar	Vasumati's brother	Telugu	
2012	Ko Ko		Kannada	
2012	Anna Bond	John Mathew	Kannada	
2012	Shiva	Panduraanga Shetty's son	Kannada	
2012	Adhinayakudu	Minister's son	Telugu	
2012	Daruvu	Bihari contract killer	Telugu	
2014	Veeram	Aaadalarasu’s right hand man	Tamil	
2014	Yevadu	Deva	Telugu	
2014	1: Nenokkadine	Antonio Rosarius' henchman	Telugu	
2015	Baahubali: The Beginning	Kalakeya Warrior	Telugu	
2015	Bruce Lee		Telugu	
2016	Lakshmana		Kannada	
2016	Sardaar Gabbar Singh	Pathaan	Telugu	
2016	Janatha Garage	Satpal	Telugu	
2016	Chuttalabbai		Telugu	
2017	Tiyaan	Muthassim	Malayalam	
2017	Raja The Great	Devaraj's henchman	Telugu	
2018	K.G.F: Chapter 1	John	Kannada	
2019	Venky Mama	Bihari contract killer	Telugu	
2019	Maharshi	Vivek Mittal's PA	Telugu	
2021	Sarpatta Parambarai	Vembuli	Tamil	
2022	Poikkal Kuthirai	Deva	Tamil	
2022	James	John	Kannada	
2022	K.G.F: Chapter 2	John	Kannada	
2023	Thunivu	Krish	Tamil	
2023	Veera Simha Reddy	Raja Reddy	Telugu	
2024	Captain Miller	Prince Jayavardhan	Tamil	
2025	Madha Gaja Raja	Pedha Perumal's son	Tamil	
2025	Kadhalikka Neramillai	Karan	Tamil	
2026	Blast	Varun Dhayalan	Tamil	

=== Television ===
List of John Kokken television credits
Year	Title	Role	Channel	Notes
2023	The Village	Farhan Hameed	Amazon Prime Video	Tamil
2023	The Freelancer	Raghavendra Sethu	Disney+ Hotstar	Hindi
