= Maara =

2021 film by Dhilip Kumar

- Release poster
- Directed by: Dhilip Kumar
- Written by: Bipin; Dhilip Kumar
- Based on: Charlie by Martin Prakkat
- Produced by: Prateek Chakravorty; Shruti Nallappa
- Starring: R. Madhavan; Shraddha Srinath; Abhirami; Sshivada
- Cinematography: Dinesh B. Krishnan; Karthik Muthukumar
- Edited by: Bhuvan Srinivasan
- Music by: Ghibran
- Production company: Pramod Films
- Distributed by: Amazon Prime Video
- Release date: 8 January 2021
- Running time: 150 minutes
- Country: India
- Language: Tamil

Maara (transl. Death) is a 2021 Indian Tamil-language adventure romantic drama film directed by Dhilip Kumar in his directorial debut, and produced by Prateek Chakravorty and Shruti Nallappa of Pramod Films. A remake of the 2015 Malayalam film Charlie by Martin Prakkat, it stars R. Madhavan, Shraddha Srinath, Abhirami, and Sshivada.

Pramod Films acquired the remake rights in early 2016, after which it underwent a series of casting and screenplay changes for two years. In June 2018, Dhilip Kumar was announced to direct the film, after Martin Prakkat (the director of the original film), and A. L. Vijay, opted out of the project. Filming commenced in June 2018, with sporadic schedules at Kochi and Pondicherry, before the shooting wrapped up in late 2020. The film's music is composed by Ghibran, with cinematography and editing handled by Dinesh B. Krishnan, Karthik Muthukumar, and Bhuvan Srinivasan, respectively.

The film was scheduled for a direct release through over-the-top media services after theatrical release plans failed to happen due to the COVID-19 pandemic in India. Amazon Prime Video, which acquired the streaming rights of the film, premiered it on 8 January 2021.

== Plot ==
Parvathy (Shraddha Srinath) a.k.a. Paaru is a restoration architect who comes to a small coastal village in Kerala for a project, while avoiding a marriage set-up back home. She finds a fairy-tale she had heard long ago as a child painted across the village. With the help of her friend, she ends up renting a house, filled messily with art and artefacts. She learns that it belongs to an artist named Maara (R. Madhavan) who is responsible for the paintings across the village. Maara is a free spirit and traveller who is often away visiting various places and returning as he pleases. When she starts cleaning up the place, she finds Maara's photo and a sketchbook. The sketches depict the previous New Year's Eve when a small-time thief (Alexander Babu) tried to rob Maara. In a turn-of-events, Maara joins the thief, and they both go to the rooftop of a home with a plan to rob the place. There, they see a woman about to shoot herself. The sketchbook ends there, and the story is left unfinished, which piques Paaru's curiosity about the rest of the story, and Maara as a person.

Intrigued, Paaru starts finding the people in Maara's sketches. Backtracking his steps, she meets an antique dealer, Usman bhai, a "pirate", Chokku and learns about Selvi (Abhirami), a prostitute that Maara had known. Maara and Chokku had taken Selvi out to sea for her birthday where after having an evening that alleviated her sorrows, Selvi committed suicide. Maara then ensures that her daughter, Rani is enrolled into a school. When Paaru gets news that Rani has gone missing from her school, she traces her back to her father's lodge. Meanwhile, Maara, who has returned to the village, tracks Rani down to the lodge and rescues her from her abuser. Paaru gets a glimpse of Maara but just misses an encounter with him.

One day, she meets the thief depicted in the sketches and enquires about that day's events. He informs her that Maara stopped the woman from shooting herself, and followed her when she started to run away from him. They find the house and finally identify the woman as Doctor Kani (Sshivada). Paaru then tracks her to a mountain village and enquires about her story. Kani explains that when she performed her first independent operation as a paediatrician, a surgical error led to the death of a 10-year-old girl. Further slandered by the media, she was desperate and about to commit suicide on New Year's Eve when she was by chance, stopped by Maara. Maara then brings her to his mountain village, maintained by Vellaiya (Moulee), his foster father, and she has since been living there. Vellaiya, a retired postmaster and a hopeless romantic, has been searching for his teenage love Meenakshi for nearly fifty years. Vellaiya constantly tells the story of acting out a play to convey his love to Meenakshi, and eventually losing her when a storm flooded his home village.

When Vellaiya shows Paaru a photo of Meenakshi, she notices that she has on the same pendant of a conch as her aunt, Mary, who is a nurse at a convent. She brings her Aunt Mary to the village on Vellaiya's birthday, realising that the plot of his play is the fairy-tale she had heard as a child from Aunt Mary - a story of an immortal soldier who spends years looking for his beloved mystical fish. An emotional Velliya, who has spent all his adult life travelling from place to place in search of Meenakshi, thanks Paaru for fulfilling Velliya's wish. Paaru, who has chased one story after another in an attempt to find Maara, finally meets him in person. They introduce themselves and hold hands as they watch the sun set.

== Cast ==
- R. Madhavan as Manimaaran (Maara)
  - Minon as Young Maara
- Shraddha Srinath as Parvathi aka Paaru (Voice-over by Shakthisree Gopalan)
- Abhirami as Selvi
- Sshivada as Kani
- Moulee as Velayya
- M. S. Bhaskar as Usman Bhai
- Guru Somasundaram as Chokku
- Kishore as David
- Appukutty as Lingam
- R. S. Shivaji as Selvam
- Alexander Babu as Thief
- Maala Parvathi as Paaru's mother
- Seema as Paaru's grandmother
- Padmavati Rao as Mary/ Meenakshi
- Rajesh Sharma as Logu
- Ananth Nag as Bala
- Junior Balaiah as Sethu
- Surjith Gopinath as Musafir
- Naveen George Thomas as Mithran
- Bharathi Mani as Sampath
- Punya Elizabeth Bose as Paaru's friend
- Geevee as Afzal
- Nakshatra Prashant as Rani
- Kalesh Ramanand as Kishore
- Hannah as Laya
- Sana as Sumathi
- Bhagyalakshmi as Kamala
- Vishnu Govindhan as Kulfi Guy
- Baby Aaradhya Shri as Baby Paaru

== Production ==
=== Pre-production ===
Producers Prateek Chakravorty and Shruti Nallappa of Pramod Films acquired the Tamil remake rights of the Malayalam film Charlie (2015) by Martin Prakkat, in February 2016. The producers were initially keen to retain Parvathy Thiruvothu from the original version, and considered either Vijay Sethupathi, Sivakarthikeyan or Siddharth to play the titular role. In April 2016, R. Madhavan was signed on to play the lead role, while Prakkat agreed to also direct the Tamil version of the film. The director later opted out and A. L. Vijay was signed in June 2016 to helm the project, and agreed in principle to take up the project after the completion of his commitments on Devi (2016) and Vanamagan (2017).

In January 2017, Sai Pallavi signed on to play the leading female role, with the makers announcing that production would soon begin in Ooty and Pondicherry. Following several months of inactivity, Vijay confirmed in June 2017 that he would be prioritising other projects and the adaptation of the film was indefinitely postponed. He opted to instead work on the bilingual drama Karu (2018) with the dates he had for Sai Pallavi, and completed an alternate project for Pramod Films, Lakshmi (2018).

=== Development ===
In June 2018, Pramod Films announced that they would make the film under the title of Maara with director Dhilip Kumar (of Kalki fame) signed on to replace Vijay. Dhilip confirmed that the makers were keen to retain Madhavan for the film despite the change of crew, believing that only the actor had the "innate charm" meant for the character of the lead protagonist. Dhilip stated that the makers were initially apprehensive about casting Shraddha Srinath as the lead actress, as she had already been paired with Madhavan in Vikram Vedha (2017), but finalised her because Maara was in a different genre. The director also suggested that he felt both Madhavan and Shraddha shared the real-life characteristics of their on-screen roles. Ghibran was signed as the film's music composer, and cinematographers Dinesh Krishnan and Karthik Muthukumar, editor Bhuvan Srinivasan, Malayali art director Ajayan Challisery was also picked to join the crew.

=== Filming ===
The actors completed a week-long rehearsal before the start of the shoot, with production beginning in Pondicherry on 18 June 2018. The film was subsequently put on hold and Madhavan later became busy with the production of his directorial debut, Rocketry: The Nambi Effect (2020), meaning that there was a schedule break of over a year. In October 2019, production restarted in Kochi with child actor Minon and comedian Alexander Babu joining the cast. In June 2020, Pramod Films stated that the film's shooting was completed in March 2020, prior to the COVID-19 lockdown in India. The film was in post-production by June.

== Music ==
The film's music and background score were composed by Ghibran, with lyrics written by Thamarai. On 28 October 2020, Think Music India released the lyrical video of the first single "Yaar Azhaippadhu". The second single "Oru Arai Unathu" was released on 20 November 2020. The third single "Oh Azhage" sung by Benny Dayal, was released on 4 December 2020. The full album was released on 1 January 2021.

== Release ==
The film was scheduled to release directly through Amazon Prime Video, skipping theatrical release as a result of theatres being shut down due to the COVID-19 pandemic in India. On 9 October 2020, Amazon Prime Video announced the release date of 9 original films, which included Maara scheduled for a release on 17 December 2020. However, a new release date of 8 January 2021 was announced later.

== Reception ==
M. Suganth of The Times of India gave 3 out of 5 stars stating "The best thing about Maara is that it doesn't come across as a cash-in on a beloved film, but a lovingly crafted movie that respects its source material but also wants to be its own work" but felt the ending "doesn't leave you on a high that the initial moments promised." Logesh Balachandran, writing for India Today, gave 3 out of 5 and stated "Though it's difficult to recreate the magic of the original film Charlie, Dhilip has managed to retain its essence and delivered a film that leaves a lasting impact."

S. Srivatsan of The Hindu stated "From an aesthetic point of view, 'Maara' directed by Dhilip Kumar is beautifully-shot and works somewhat better than the Malayalam film 'Charlie', although its rigidity comes close to spoiling the otherwise pleasant and charming film." Haricharan Pudipeddi, writing for Hindustan Times stated "Maara isn't a frame-by-frame copy, but it retains the magic of Charlie." Shubhra Gupta, writing for The Indian Express, gave 3 out of 5 stating, "Madhavan is appropriately loose-limbed and dishy as he ambles through the film, spreading grizzled, warm charm." Sudhir Srinivasan, gave 3 out of 5 stars for the film, in his review for Cinema Express, stating "This film that contains within it several smaller stories, like it were a book of fairytales, is an appeal to recognise the magicality of our world and its people."

Ranjani Krishnakumar, writing for Firstpost, gave 2.5 out of 5 stars stating "If you aren't instinctively drawn to the mystical world that Maara and Paru occupy, or even find it desirable, the film is a drag. If you're a hopeless, dreamy romantic at heart, you might find your longing fulfilled." Baradwaj Rangan of Film Companion stated "The beauty of this fable, based on Charlie, is how much of a love story it is, and yet how it's not really the love story of the "hero" and the "heroine"." Gautaman Baskaran of News18 gave 3 out of 5 and stated "A truly charismatic Madhavan and an unforgettable Srinath make Maara a great watch." Sowmya Rajendran of The News Minute, gave 3.5 out of 5 stating "Madhavan as Maara, however, looks jaded, but Shraddha Srinath carries the film through with her charm."
