= Fingertip (TV series) =

Indian webseries by Shashant Shah on Zee5

- Poster
- Genre: Crime; Drama; Thriller
- Screenplay by: Neelan K. Sekar; S. Shivakar
- Directed by: S. Shivakar
- Starring: Akshara Haasan; Gayathrie; Sunaina; Ashwin Kakumanu
- Composer: Dheena Dhayalan
- Country of origin: India
- Original language: Tamil
- No. of seasons: 2

Production
- Producers: Vishnu Vardhan; Anu Vardhan
- Production company: Vishnu Vardhan Films

Original release
- Network: Zee5
- Release: 21 August 2019

Fingertip is a 2019 Indian Tamil-language streaming television series, starring Akshara Haasan, Ashwin Kakumanu, Sunaina, and Gayathrie. Fingertip was directed by Srinivasan Shivakar and premiered on ZEE5 on 21 August 2019. Season 2 premiered on June 17, 2022.

== Overview ==
| Season | Original broadcast | |
| Season | First aired | Episodes |
|---|---|---|
| 1 | 21 August 2019 | 5 |
| 2 | 17 June 2022 | 8 |

== Cast ==
- Akshara Haasan as Priya
- Ashwin Kakumanu as Sanjay
- Sunaina as Rekha
- Shivaji Dev as Vijay
- Gayathrie as Sandhya
- Madhusudhan Rao as Krishnamoorthy
- Sanjana Sarathy as Vidhya
- Jeeva Ravi as Ramalingam, Sanjay's assistant
- Uma Padmanabhan as Priya's mother
- Siddhartha Shankar as Varun
- Rohith Muralidharan as Raghavan

== Season 1 ==
=== Episodes ===
| No. | Title | Directed by | Written by | Original release date |
|---|---|---|---|---|
| 1 | "Greed" | Shivakar | Shivakar | 21 August 2019 |
Rekha and Vijay, married and living in a city, face serious challenges when the social media platform, Clicker, enters their lives. Rekha is overjoyed with her new-found success on Clicker and is ready to go to any extreme to retain her online popularity.
| 2 | "Rage" | Shivakar | Shivakar | 21 August 2019 |
Krishnamoorthy, a retired banker and a strict disciplinarian, is finding it tough to deal with a real-life situation when a threat from the digital world forces him to face unexpected consequences.
| 3 | "Betrayal" | Shivakar | Shivakar | 21 August 2019 |
Priya and Vidhya's friendship takes a hit when Varun, a handsome young man, enters their lives. And social media platforms, instead of bringing the friends closer, only heighten Priya's woes permanently changing her equation with her friend.
| 4 | "Lust" | Shivakar | Shivakar | 21 August 2019 |
Sandhya is a postgraduate student who harbours numerous dreams and ambitions. Raghavan, an IT professional, on the other hand, lives a monotonous life. The two instantly hit it off after connecting on dating app Qupid. But the seemingly perfect relationship suddenly begins to develop cracks with unforeseen twists and turns.
| 5 | "Vengeance" | Shivakar | Shivakar | 21 August 2019 |
Sanjay is an actor who is loved by the masses and the classes alike. The star is highly active and vocal on the social media platform Expressit. However, he is not aware of the surprise that Expressit has in store for him a surprise that will challenge his reputation, his family, and, ultimately, his decade-long career.

== Season 2 ==
Fingertip (Season 2) is an original Tamil-language television series directed by Srinivasan Shivakar starring Prasanna, Aparana Balamurali, Regina Cassandra, Vinoth Kishan, Kanna Ravi, and Sharath Ravi.
