= Mamathi Chari =

Indian radio jockey and actress

- Born: 21 December 1978 (age 47); Chennai, Tamil Nadu, India
- Other names: Sharmal
- Occupations: Television personality; actress
- Years active: 2007 – present

Mamathi Chari (born 21 December 1978) is an Indian radio jockey, television personality and actress who predominantly appears in Tamil films and television shows. She hosted the television show Vanakkam Tamizha and appeared as an actress in the soap opera Vani Rani.

== Personal life ==
Mamathi was born on 21 December 1978, in Chennai, Tamil Nadu. She studied at Sacred Heart Matriculation Higher Secondary School and later attended I.P. Pavlov, where she graduated Medicine. After her divorce, she took a hiatus from the entertainment industry and became a businesswoman. She came back to the limelight in 2017. However in 2020 she announced that she permanently is going to quit the television industry and focus on medical school.

== Career ==
Mamathi started her career as anchor for Raj TV. She worked as an RJ for Big FM's Big Vanakkam in 2007 before working as a host for several television shows. She made her acting debut in the soap opera Vani Rani which aired on Sun TV 2013. She played the dual role of Kokila Saaminathan and Jessie both antagonist characters. She later appeared as a radio jockey on the television show Vanakkam Tamizha which also aired on Sun TV. In 2018 she participated in the reality show which aired on Star Vijay called Bigg Boss (Tamil season 2) participating as a contestant, however she was later evicted from the house on day 14 of the show. After her eviction from the show she acted in the mini web series called Time Enna Boss!? in 2020.

In 2022, she announced her return after a 2 years hiatus and was cast in a supporting role in the upcoming film Thunivu alongside actors Ajith Kumar and Manju Warrier.

== Filmography ==
Year	Film	Role	Notes
2023	Thunivu	Channel Head	
2023	Kolai	Doctor	

=== Web series ===
Year	Title	Role	Network
2020	Time Enna Boss!?	House Owner	Amazon Prime Video

== Television ==
Year	Show	Role	Channel	Notes
2001	Nee Naan Aval		Star Vijay	
2004	Hello Thamizha	Host	Star Vijay	
2013	Rani Maharani	Host	Sun TV	
2013-2017	Vani Rani	Kokila Saaminathan / Jessie	Sun TV	Dual roles
2017	Vanakkam Tamizha	Host	Sun TV	
2018	Bigg Boss (Tamil season 2)	Contestant	Star Vijay	Evicted Day 14
