= The Village (2023 TV series) =

- Release poster
- Genre: Horror; Thriller
- Written by: Deepthi Govindarajan; Milind Rau; Deeraj Vaidy
- Directed by: Milind Rau
- Starring: Arya; Divya Pillai; Baby Aazhiya
- Music by: Girishh Gopalakrishnan
- Country of origin: India
- Original language: Tamil
- No. of seasons: 1
- No. of episodes: 6

Production
- Producer: B. S. Radhakrishnan
- Cinematography: Sivakumar Vijayan
- Editor: Lawrence Kishore
- Running time: 30-35 minutes
- Production company: Studio Shakthi Productions

Original release
- Network: Amazon Prime Video
- Release: 24 November 2023

The Village is an Indian Tamil-language horror thriller television series created and directed by Milind Rau, for Amazon Prime Video. It was produced by B. S. Radhakrishnan, under Studio Shakthi Productions.

The story was initially based on Asvin Srivatsangam and Shamik Dasgupta's graphic horror novel of the same name, initially published by Yali Dream Creations. The principal characters of the series include Arya, Divya Pillai, Baby Aazhiya, Aadukalam Naren, George Maryan, Vettai Muthukumar, John Kokken, and Pooja Ramachandran. It premiered on 24 November 2023 and consisted of six episodes.

== Cast ==
- Arya as Dr. Gautham Subramanian
- Divya Pillai as Neha Subramanian, Gautham's wife
- Baby Aazhiya as Maya Subramanian, Gautham's daughter
- Aadukalam Naren as Sakthivel
- George Maryan as Peter Pandiyan
- Vettai Muthukumar as Karunagam
- John Kokken as Farhan Hameed
- Pooja Ramachandran as Happy
- Jayaprakash as GSR
- Thalaivasal Vijay as Jagan
- Arjun Chidambaram as Prakash
- Kalairani as Subhadra
- Sunny PN as Sairaj
- Ashwin Kkumar as Devraj
- A. Seemon as Lucky
- Kabali Vishwanth as Sethu
- Abishek Kumar as Arul
- Anand Sami as Tejas
- Naveen George Thomas as Sanjeev
- Aadhira Pandilakshmi as Revathi
- Aathma Patrick as Vettaiyan
- Gokulan as Pillai
- Neelan K. Sekar as Ponraj
- Magalakshmi Sudarsanan as Pavazhakodi
- Vignesh Kumar as Hazmat Suit Scientist
- Shriram as Prakash's Doctor
- Mullai Arasi as Pavazhakodi Friend
- Mano as Quarry Man
- Anand as Exogenyx Lab Scientist
- Tharani Suresh as Mala Sethu

== Production ==
=== Development ===
The series was announced by Amazon Prime Video on 28 April 2022. Actor Arya will next be seen in a Horror series titled The Village, which is based on Asvin Srivatsangam and Shamik Dasgupta's graphic horror novel of the same name.

The series is produced by BS Radhakrishnan under the Studio Shakthi Productions. Milind Rau of Netrikann (2021) fame, has directed and written the series.

=== Casting ===
Actor Arya plays the young doctor Gautham Subramanian. This is his debut role in a limited series. Divya Pillai was cast as Gautham's wife Neha, Baby Aazhiya was cast as Neha and Gautham's daughter Maya.

== Release ==
=== Streaming ===
It was announced on 17 November 2023 that the series will be released on 24 November 2023 in Tamil, Telugu, Malayalam, Kannada and Hindi, languages on Amazon Prime Video.
