= Super Senior Heroes =

2022 Indian TV movie

- Poster
- Written by: Karthik Kumar; Vinodhini Vaidyanathan
- Directed by: Karthik Kumar
- Starring: K. Bhagyaraj; Ambika; Pandiarajan; Manobala; Chinni Jayanth
- Music by: Girishh G.
- Country of origin: India
- Original language: Tamil

Production
- Producers: Siddharth Anand Kumar; Vikram Mehra
- Cinematography: Siddharth Ramaswamy
- Editors: Anurodh Gusain; Kishan Chezhian
- Running time: 122 minutes
- Production company: Yoodlee Films

Original release
- Network: Sun TV
- Release: 6 October 2022

Super Senior Heroes is a 2022 Indian Tamil-language superhero comedy drama film directed by Karthik Kumar and starring K. Bhagyaraj, Ambika, Pandiarajan, Manobala and Chinni Jayanth in the titular roles. The film had a direct release on Sun TV on 16 October 2022. The film released on Netflix on 21 October 2022. Bhagyaraj and Ambika had previously co-starred in Andha 7 Naatkal (1981).

The film "hints at redefining superhero genre" by casting older actors in the roles of superheroes, which are usually portrayed by youngsters. According to the director, "There’ll be parallel tracks of comedy which don’t ever entwine with the spine of the film. It’s like an item song—the comedy is an extra thing. You don’t need to understand the story or the film to understand the comedy. This isn’t the case with Super Senior Heroes."

== Plot ==
Ganeshan's wife dies and his grandson Aadith, who loves superheroes, finds it hard to connect with his grandfather, so Ganeshan and his friends act as superheroes.

== Cast ==
- K. Bhagyaraj as Ganeshan
- Ambika as Mrs. S a.k.a. Lady Justice
- Pandiarajan as Captain
- Manobala as Mohan, magician
- Chinni Jayanth as Ashok
- Lalith Aaditya as Aadith
- Aneesha as Gauri
- Amrutha Srinivasan as Inspector Selvi
- Jayachandran as Velayudham
- M. V. Premkumar as Ravi
- Kavithalaya Krishnan as Bhagyaraj and Pandiraj
- D. Amjath Khan as James
- Chang as Watchman
- Pramodhini as Ganeshan's wife (guest appearance)
- Vinodhini Vaidyanathan as Reporter (guest appearance)
- Sekar Dhanasekaran as drunkard in temple

== Soundtrack ==
The music was composed by Girishh G.

Super Senior Heroes

Soundtrack album by Girishh G.
- Released: 2022
- Genre: Feature film soundtrack
- Length: 12:53
- Language: Tamil
- Label: Saregama

Girishh G. chronology
Veetla Vishesham (2022)	Super Senior Heroes (2022)	Kolai (2023)

Track listing
No.	Title	Lyrics	Singer(s)	Length
1.	"Vaa Namakkena"	Snehan	Ananthu	3:25
2.	"Shloka Rap"	Mohan Rajan	Manikka Vinayagam	3:38
3.	"Imma Super Hero"	Syan Saheer	Uthara Unnikrishnan, Adithya Balajee, Pranav R	2:56
4.	"Sambhavi Yuge Yuge"		Sooraj Santhosh	2:38
Total length:				12:53

== Reception ==
A critic from Thanthi TV felt that the film's comedy worked well but the film lagged due to its wafer-thin, predictable storyline.
