= Time Enna Boss!? =

2019 Indian web series

- Genre: Science fiction sitcom
- Directed by: Subu
- Starring: Bharath; Karunakaran; Robo Shankar; Priya Bhavani Shankar; Sanjana Sarathy; Alexander Babu
- Music by: Madley Blues
- Country of origin: India
- Original language: Tamil
- No. of seasons: 1
- No. of episodes: 10

Production
- Cinematography: V. Murali Krishna
- Production company: Kavithalayaa Productions

Original release
- Network: Amazon Prime Video
- Release: 18 September 2020

Time Enna Boss!? (transl. What is the time, boss!?) is an Indian Tamil-language science fiction sitcom web series directed by Subu. The plot of the film who facing the regular adventures of an IT man, who finally ends up sharing his condo with four random time travelers from unique time periods, who by chance get trapped in modern-day Chennai. It was released on Amazon Prime Video.

== Cast ==
=== Main ===
- Bharath as Balamurugan (Bala)
- Karunakaran as Buggy
- Robo Shankar as Killi Vallavan (Killi)
- Priya Bhavani Shankar as Dr. Bharathi
- Sanjana Sarathy as Hannah Clarke
- Alexander Babu as Watchman Sandosham

=== Guest stars ===
- Mamathi Chari as House Owner
- Pavithra Lakshmi as Sandhiya
- R.S. Shivaji as Roon Jaham
- George Maryan as Aalavaayan
- R. Aravindraj as Traffic Constable
- Ashok Selvan as Kabir Kannan
- Maya S. Krishnan as Velleli
- Mippu as Customer
- Pallavi Sadanand as Suganthi
- Vignesh Vijayan as Britto
- Radha Mani as Balamurugan's grandmother
- Rajendran as "Semma Singer" Judge / Mahatma Gandhi from Earth 36
- R. Parthiban as Narrator
- Lollu Sabha Swetha as Bala's auntie

== Release ==
The series was released in Amazon Prime Video on September 18, 2020.

== List of episodes ==
=== Season 1 ===
No. overall	No. in season	Title	Directed by	Written by	Original release date
1	1	"Flush In"	Subu	Subu	September 3, 2020
2	2	"Jobs"	Subu	Unknown	September 3, 2020
3	3	"Midnight Masala"	Subu	Subu	September 3, 2020
4	4	"Adhaan Plan!"	Subu	Subu	September 3, 2020
5	5	"Crush Next Door"	Subu	Subu	September 3, 2020
6	6	"Shrooms"	Subu	Subu	September 3, 2020
7	7	"Run Buggy Run!"	Subu	Subu	September 18, 2020
8	8	"Bottle Neck"	Subu	Subu	September 18, 2020
9	9	"Horoscope"	Subu	Subu	September 3, 2020
10	10	"Flush Out"	Subu	Subu	September 3, 2020
