= Sivakumar Vijayan =

Indian Cinematographer

- Education: Satyajit Ray Film and Television Institute
- Occupation: Cinematographer

Sivakumar Vijayan is an Indian cinematographer who works in Tamil films.

== Career ==
He debuted with the Tamil feature film, Vidiyum Munn (2013), in which he was highly appreciated for his work. He worked on a sports drama Iruthi Sutru (2016) directed by Sudha Kongara, a bilingual made simultaneously in Tamil as Saala Khadoos, in Hindi.

== Filmography ==
=== As cinematographer ===
Movie	Year	Language	Notes
2013	Vidiyum Munn	Tamil	
2016	Irudhi Suttru; Saala Khadoos	Tamil; Hindi	
2016	Iraivi	Tamil	
2017	Sathriyan	Tamil	
2018	Kolamavu Kokila	Tamil	Nominated—SIIMA Award for Best Cinematographer
2019	NGK	Tamil	
2019	Jack & Daniel	Malayalam	
2023	Kolai	Tamil	
2023	The Village	Tamil	Amazon Prime Video series
2026	Demonte Colony 3	Tamil	
