= Vidiyum Munn =

2013 Indian film by Balaji K. Kumar

- Theatrical release poster
- Directed by: Balaji K. Kumar
- Written by: Paul Andrew Williams; Balaji K. Kumar; Abraham Prabu; Mithran Saravanan
- Produced by: Javed Khayum
- Starring: Pooja Umashankar; Malavika Manikuttan
- Cinematography: Sivakumar Vijayan
- Edited by: Sathyaraj Natarajan
- Music by: Girishh Gopalakrishnan
- Production company: Khayum Studios
- Distributed by: PVR Pictures
- Release date: 29 November 2013
- Running time: 137 minutes
- Country: India
- Language: Tamil

Vidiyum Munn (transl. Before dawn) is a 2013 Indian Tamil-language crime thriller film directed by Balaji K. Kumar. The film stars Pooja Umashankar and Malavika Manikuttan, while R. Amarendran, Vinoth Kishan, and John Vijay play supporting roles. The music was composed by Girishh Gopalakrishnan with cinematography by Sivakumar Vijayan and editing by Sathyaraj Natarajan. It is about a prostitute trying to rescue a girl from the clutches of prostitution.

Vidiyum Munn was released on 29 November 2013 with the Auro 3D 11.1 surround sound system, and received critical acclaim. It is an uncredited remake of the 2006 British film London to Brighton.

== Plot ==
Rekha, an ageing prostitute, is seen selling herself to old and low-level people to eke out a living. During one of her sessions, she meets with her old pimp Saloon Singaram, who informs her that he needs her help to bring in a virgin, prepubescent girl for one of his major clients: Periayyah, an unnamed, wealthy liquor baron of India. She refuses initially and accepts reluctantly after he agrees to split the profits with her. Singaram takes Rekha to meet with her old pimp and ex-lover Doraisingam, who is now bedridden and furious at Rekha for leaving him. However, Rekha convinces him to deliver the girl to her, on the condition that the girl be returned the very next day. After picking up the girl, Nandini, Rekha travels with Singaram to get Nandini ready for the night. Even though she tries to develop a bond with the girl, Nandini shies away, avoiding talking to Rekha. Although Rekha does not tell Nandini about what is going to happen to her, she is constantly tormented by her actions and feels responsible for the girl.

Everything goes according to Singaram's plan, and Rekha accompanies the girl to Periayyah's mansion. Periayyah takes the girl upstairs and starts to tie her up. As the girl protests, Periayyah is seen taking up a razor blade, when suddenly Rekha breaks into the room, and a struggle ensues in which Periayyah is killed. Rekha and Nandini escape the mansion and go on the run. Singaram is then visited by the henchmen of Chinnaiah, Periayyah's son. They question her about the girl he sent and threaten him to find them within a day. An intimidated Singaram approaches Lankesh, a rogue detective with an eye for details. Lankesh agrees to help Singaram track down the girl for a sum. In his search of Rekha's apartment, he discovers a photo of her friend taken in Srirangam, and concludes that the two are headed there.

As this happens, Doraisingam's men spot the girl and Rekha on a train. They decide to kidnap her, but their attempts are thwarted, and the two escape to Srirangam and meet with Devanayagi, Rekha's old friend. While on his search, Chinnaiah and his men kill Doraisingam while also killing a man who knew about his father's bad habits. Lankesh, with Singaram, tracks down the house in which Devanayagi lives and takes Rekha and Nandini out while calling Chinnaiah to the area, so he can have his revenge against them for killing his father. Chinnaiah arrives with his men but kills Singaram and Lankesh instead while giving money to Rekha to live her life onwards. The reasoning behind this is that when Chinnaiah was in school, his father raped and killed a female classmate of his. Disgusted with his father's actions, Chinnaiah decides to look for the person who killed his father and gives Rekha and Nandini hope. The film ends with Rekha and Nandini travelling on a bus.

== Cast ==
- Pooja Umashankar as Rekha
- Malavika Manikuttan as Nandhini
- R. Amarendran as Saloon Singaram
- Vinoth Kishan as Chinnaiah
  - Bhargav as Young Chinnaiah
- John Vijay as Lankesh
- Lakshmi Ramakrishnan as Devanayagi
- Vettai Muthukumar as Mani
- Rail Ravi as Periayyah
- Jasper as Doraisingam
- Billy Murali as Velu
- Ruben as Albert
- Aroul D. Shankar as Doss
- Murali as Menon
- Angel as Angel
- Natchathira as Ammu
- Anmol as Appu
- Sivakumar as Pachamuthu
- Aristopathy as Sub-Inspector
- N. P. Jothi as Devilish Guy
- Saravanan as Samiyar
- Jennifer as Priya
- Manjula as Shilpa
- Nabarun Ghosh as Bhattar
- Senthil as Menon's doctor
- Devi Shanmugam as Saloon Doctor
- Pei Krishnan as Senior Henchman
- Parotta Murugesan as Lord Owner
- Karthikeyan as TTR

== Production ==
Vidiyum Munn was originally planned to be produced in Hollywood as an English-language film but director Balaji K. Kumar changed it to Tamil as he felt the theme would suit Indian audiences better. Abraham Prabhu and Mithran Sarvanan, two assistant directors, helped adapt the dialogues in Tamil. Pooja Umashankar accepted the film in less than five minutes into reading the script, and gained 8 kilograms (18 lb) of weight for her role. Cinematography was handled by Sivakumar Vijayan, and editing Sathyaraj Natrajan.

== Soundtrack ==
The music is composed by Girishh Gopalakrishnan, who also wrote the lyrics. British musician Susheela Raman lent her voice for the song "Penne", marking her debut in Tamil cinema. The audio was launched on 16 August 2013.

Track listing
No.	Title	Singer(s)	Length
1.	"Theeratha Mounam"	Tanvi Rao	04:46
2.	"Vidiyatha Iravu"	Girishh Gopalakrishnan, Yasin Nazar, Ramshankar S, Sai Krishna Kumar	05:21
3.	"Penne"	Susheela Raman, Ramshankar S, Shilpa Natarajan	04:29
4.	"Theeradha Mounam" (reprise)	Girishh Gopalakrishnan	04:27
5.	"Rage" (soundtrack)	–	03:12
6.	"Redemption" (soundtrack)	–	02:01
Total length:			24:16

== Release ==
Vidiyum Munn had a press screening on 25 November 2013, and was theatrically released four days later, 29 November. PVR Pictures joined as the release partner and Vidiyum Munn was the first Tamil feature film to be distributed by them. It was released with the Auro-3D 11.1 surround sound system.

== Reception ==
Baradwaj Rangan wrote for The Hindu, "Balaji K. Kumar's Vidiyum Munn is the most excitingly staged movie since Mysskin's Onaayum Aattukuttiyum [...] The pace is deliberate, and the subject matter is bracingly adult. No attempts are made to dilute the mood". Haricharan Pudipeddi of IANS gave the film 3 stars out of 5 and wrote, "Vidiyum Munn is a step closer to alternate Tamil cinema which majorly caters to those with some intellect and not to entertainment seekers. Vidiyum Munn stands out as one of the better thrillers of the recent past". Sify wrote, "Debutant Balaji K Kumar's Vidiyum Munn is one of the best new generation thrillers in recent times. It is not the usual masala thriller, but something different that grabs you with its taut narration, superb performances, great background score and a riveting climax".

S. Saraswathi of Rediff.com gave 3.5 stars out of 5 and wrote, "The stark simplicity of the dialogues, the well-etched characters, the intriguing plot, the captivating music, the cinematography, but most of all the brilliant twist at the end makes Director Balaji K Kumar's Vidiyum Munn a must watch". The Times of India gave 3.5 stars out of 5 and wrote, "There are some nail-biting moments and an uncomfortable one, and director Balaji Kumar extracts some fine performances from the cast. He is aided by the moody visuals of his cinematographer Sivakumar Vijayan and an evocative score from composer Girish Gopalakrishnan, and manages to maintain the suspense and keep us engrossed as the past and present unfold. (There) are small lapses that we can willingly excuse in a film that is otherwise terrific". Malini Mannath of The New Indian Express wrote, "Vidiyum Munn is a tastefully and a sensitively crafted depiction of the sleazy side of society".
