= Aval (2017 film) =

2017 Indian horror film by Milind Rau

- Poster of Hindi version
- Directed by: Milind Rau
- Written by: Milind Rau; Siddharth (also dialogues); Chandan Arora (Hindi dialogues)
- Produced by: Siddharth
- Starring: Siddharth; Andrea Jeremiah
- Cinematography: Shreyaas Krishna
- Edited by: Lawrence Kishore
- Music by: Girishh G.
- Production companies: Viacom 18 Motion Pictures; Etaki Entertainment
- Distributed by: Viacom 18 Motion Pictures; Grand Showbiz Medias(International)
- Release dates: 3 November 2017 (Tamil); 10 November 2017 (Hindi)
- Running time: 138 minutes
- Country: India
- Languages: Tamil; Hindi

Aval (transl. Her) in Tamil and The House Next Door in Hindi, is a 2017 Indian horror film co-written and directed by Milind Rau. Shot simultaneously in the Tamil and Hindi, it stars Siddharth and Andrea Jeremiah, with Siddharth also its co-producer and co-writer. It was released on 3 November 2017 to mostly positive reviews in all languages and became a success. It was dubbed in Telugu as Gruham and released on November 17.

== Plot ==
The movie starts with the happy life of a mother and daughter back in 1934. In the present, 2016, Dr. Krishnakumar (Siddharth), a successful neurosurgeon, and his wife Lakshmi (Andrea Jeremiah) live peacefully in their beautiful house under the mountains in Rosina Valley. The D'Costa family moves into the next house, which belonged to the mother and daughter years ago. Jennifer D'Costa (Anisha Angelina Victor) is a troubled teenage daughter of the neighbors. Though she is rebellious, she deeply loves her family and her half-sister Sarah. Jenny and Sarah come to meet Lakshmi and make friends with her. Jenny is instantly attracted to Krish's charm.

The D'Costas invite Krish and Lakshmi for dinner. While exploring the house, Krish sees Jenny jumping into the well and saves her. Jenny's rebellious nature makes her do things like smoking. During one such time, when she sneaks out of the house for a smoke, she picks up some belongings of a dead person. Jenny starts to act weird soon and sleepwalks to the edge of a cliff, where her father Paul (Atul Kulkarni) and Krish save her yet again. Jenny's grandfather contacts a psychic, but Paul refuses to take any help from him. Krish refers them to his psychiatrist friend Dr. Prasad (Suresh), who gives Jenny a hypnotherapy session, and she tells him that there is someone telling her family to leave the house, and then Jenny starts speaking in Chinese. Prasad concludes she has developed paranoia with visual and auditory hallucinations and advices Paul to perform an exorcism since he is sure of some paranormal behaviors happening with Jenny. Paul calls Pastor Joshua (Prakash Belawadi) to perform the exorcism, and they find that their new house is haunted by three ancient Chinese spirits. One of them is a bloodthirsty man, while the other two spirits are the mother and the daughter, who want the family to get out of the house without trouble. The exorcism session cures Jenny, but the violent antics of the spirits injure Joshua, who falls into a coma, while Krish and Paul are also injured.

Things seem normal, and Lakshmi finds out that she is pregnant, but one day, Paul's housemaid disappears. Krish and Lakshmi also witness increasing paranormal disturbances in their daily lives. Paul finds some disturbing evidences in his house and agrees to call the psychic from earlier, and he reveals the presence of a mother and daughter spirit, asking them to leave. He also discovers their skeletal remains in the nearby cliff edge, along with the male spirit's remains.

Meanwhile, Prasad feels that there is more to the story of the spirits from Jenny's exorcism and upon researching finds that there is a witness who knows what happened in Paul's house 80 years ago, an old lady from the village. Krish and Prasad visit the old lady, who reveals that the man of the house, Lu Wei, was into black magic. He attempted to kidnap and kill her when she was a child, but his pregnant wife intervened and let her escape. It is shown that Lu Wei tried to perform the human sacrifice as a ritual so that his next offspring would be a boy. When his ritual was disturbed, Lu Wei heartlessly lures his own daughter and sacrifices her instead. Lu Wei's distraught wife witnesses this and stabs herself in the stomach, killing her and her unborn child and thereby ruining Lu Wei's plans. An enraged Lu Wei commits suicide by drowning himself in the well. The old lady further tells that all these events unfolded during a rare solar eclipse day, and a similar eclipse is bound to happen again the next day.

Krish and Prasad go back home and seemingly continue to discuss the events. The next day, Lakshmi calls out for Krish and asks him to help Jenny, since she is possessed again. When they go to Jenny's house, to Krish's surprise, Lakshmi locks him up in a room. It is then revealed that Joshua awoke from his coma and told Lakshmi that during Jenny's exorcism, he found that not only Jenny was possessed by the woman's spirit, but Krish was possessed by Lu Wei's spirit and the possession must have happened when Krish jumped into the well and rescued Jenny. Lu Wei now intends to continue where he left off and targets Sarah for his human sacrifice so that Lakshmi would give birth to a boy. It is shown that a possessed Krish had earlier killed Prasad too, since he found the truth. Krish breaks free and tries to kill Sarah and cause mayhem, but the Chinese mother-daughter spirits overpower him and destroy Lu Wei's spirit from Krish's body as the solar eclipse ends, and Krish gets back to normal.

A few years later, it is shown that Krish's family and the D'Costas are still good neighbors, while Lakshmi and Krish now have a son, with whom Jenny and Sarah go to play. The screen closes in on the boy's eye, which changes to show double irises, implying that he could be demonic, since he was conceived when Krish was possessed by Lu Wei.

== Cast ==
- Siddharth as Dr. Krishnakumar "Krish"
- Andrea Jeremiah as Lakshmi (Voiced by Chinmayi in Hindi)
- Atul Kulkarni as Paul D'Cousta, Jenny’s father
- Suresh as Dr. Prasad
- Avinash Raghudevan as Psychic
- Prakash Belawadi as Pastor Joshua
- Bhawana Aneja as Lizzy D'Cousta, Jenny’s stepmother
- Khushi Hajare as Sarah D'Cousta, Jenny’s half sister
- Yusuf Hussain as Colonel D'Cousta, Jenny’s grandfather
- Mandakini Goswami
- Angeline Khangembam
- Peter Wong
- Joanne Chang
- Anisha Angelina Victor as Jennifer "Jenny" D'Cousta (voice by Megha Akash)
- Farrukh Jaffar
- Victor Banerjee

== Production ==
The film was planned by Siddharth in June 2016, who revealed that he would work on a horror film alongside actress Andrea Jeremiah to be directed by Milind Rau, who had earlier made the unreleased Kadhal 2 Kalyanam. The title of the film was said to be The House Next Door, and the film was subsequently shot simultaneously in three languages namely Hindi, Telugu, and Tamil. However, the Telugu version was dropped in favor of a dubbed release. The principal photography of the film commenced in August 2016. Some of Atul Kulkarni's dialogues were dubbed from the Tamil version for the Hindi version.

In October 2016, Andrea Jeremiah revealed that the shoot of the film was over.

== Music ==
Tamil tracklist
No.	Title	Lyrics	Singer(s)	Length
1.	"Kaarigai Kanne"	Muthamil	Vijay Prakash, Shakthisree Gopalan	5:20
2.	"Yaarada"	Girishh, Muthamil	Andrea Jeremiah, Mark Thomas	4:25
3.	"Xiao Xiao Ma"	Chen-Yu Maglin	Chen-Yu Maglin, Poorna M	2:25
4.	"Aval Theme"		Instrumental	1:54

Hindi tracklist

- "O Mere Sanam" - Benny Dayal
- "Ye Waqt Maut Ka Hai" - Suraj Jagan, Shilpa Natarajan

Telugu tracklist

- "Kaatukka Kanne" - Sathyaprakash, Chinmayi
- "Yevadura" - Shilpa Natrajan, Mark Thomas
- "Xiao Xiao Ma" - Chen-Yu Maglin, Poorna M

== Reception ==
On the review aggregator website Rotten Tomatoes, 100% of 7 critics' reviews are positive, with an average rating of 7/10.

=== Aval ===
Manoj Kumar R of The Indian Express rated 4 out of 5 and noted that "will test your immunity to horror films". Thinkal Menon of Times of india gave 3.5 stars out of 5 and wrote that "To say the least, Aval joins the list of well-made horror flicks made in Kollywood". Haricharan Pudipeddi critic of Hindustan Times wrote that "Siddharth’s film is treated with the same level of seriousness, and there’s never a dip in the tone" and gave 3.5 stars out of 5. India Today also rated 3.5 out of 5.

=== The House Next Door ===
Anna M. M. Vetticad rated the film 3.5 out of 5 stars and wrote, "The House Next Door is excellent fare for masochists who enjoy being repeatedly jolted in their seats in an unlit movie half". Pallabi Dey Purkayashta of The Times of India gave the film the same rating and wrote, "Despite a stretched second half, The House Next Door is one that compels you to look over your shoulders". A critic from IANS rated the film 3 out of 5 and wrote, "If you are a fan of the genre, you are advised to pay this shiver-giver a visit". Udita Jhujhunwala of Scroll.in wrote, "The House Next Door is very well crafted and a commendable addition to the genre".

== See also ==
- List of Hindi horror films
