= Marina (2012 film) =

2012 Indian film by Pandiraj

- Theatrical release poster
- Directed by: Pandiraj
- Written by: Pandiraj
- Produced by: Pandiraj
- Starring: Pakkada Pandi; Gautham Purushoth; Sivakarthikeyan; Oviya
- Cinematography: Vijay
- Edited by: Athiappan Shiva
- Music by: Girishh Gopalakrishnan
- Production company: Pasanga Productions
- Release date: 3 February 2012
- Running time: 134 minutes
- Country: India
- Language: Tamil

Marina is a 2012 Indian Tamil-language children's comedy drama film written, produced, and directed by Pandiraj and starring Pakkada Pandi, Gautham Purushoth, Sivakarthikeyan and Oviya. This film marks the debut of Purushoth and Sivakarthikeyan. The music was composed by Girishh Gopalakrishnan and the film was released on 3 February 2012. It won two Tamil Nadu State Film Awards for Best Dialogues and the Special Jury Award for Best Film.

== Plot ==
Ambikapathy is an orphan runaway who escapes from his cruel uncle to Chennai and eventually ends up at Marina Beach. He earns his livelihood by selling drinking water packets and later poached chickpeas to people visiting the beach. His calm and mature manners win him the admiration and later the friendship of other boys employed at the beach. Ambikapathy dreams of being educated, so he works in the day to save money for schooling whilst trying to study at night on his own. His desire to be enrolled in a proper school slowly begins to rub off on the other children at the beach. An old man and postman are the guardians of sorts for these street-children. The beach also attracts many lovebirds; one such couple is Senthilnathan and Swapnasundari.

== Cast ==
- Pakkada Pandi as Ambikapathy
- Gautham Purushoth as Kailasam
- Sivakarthikeyan as Senthilnaathan (Senthil)
- Oviya as Swapnasundari (Swapna)
- A. Govindamoorthy as Sevelappan
- Jithan Mohan as the postman
- Jaya Shri as Annamma
- Sundararajan as the old man
- Attakathi Arumugham as the singer
- Senthi Kumari as Swapnasundari's mother
- Sathish as Makudu, Senthil's friend
- Sathish Kumar as a vendor
- Ramesh Thilak as a courier boy
- V. Jayaprakash in a guest appearance as the school owner

Special appearances in the promotional song by

- Vikram
- Prakash Raj
- Sasikumar
- Ameer
- Sneha
- Vimal

== Production ==
Like Pandiraj's debut film Pasanga, Marina too revolves around children. He acknowledged being inspired by the theme of Mira Nair's Hindi film Salaam Bombay! (1988). Pandiraj approached Sivakarthikeyan to play the lead role and he signed the project. Sivakarthikeyan prepared for the role by paying close attention to Pandiraj's instructions and visiting Marina Beach extensively to study the surroundings, while revealing that he hoped that his natural talent of humor would come through onscreen. Vijay made his debut as cinematographer. The film was prominently shot at the beach.

== Soundtrack ==
The soundtrack of Marina, composed by the debutant Girishh Gopalakrishnan, was released on 9 January 2012 at the Marina Beach. The song "Vanakkam Vaazhavaikkum Chennai", penned by Na. Muthukumar, talks about life in Chennai.

Track listing
No.	Title	Lyrics	Singer(s)	Length
1.	"Vanakkam Chennai"	Na. Muthukumar	Mukesh Mohamed, Shilpa Natarajan, Ramshanker	4:40
2.	"Kadhal Oru Devadhai"	Na. Muthukumar	Haricharan, M. M. Manasi	4:51
3.	"Marina Marina Theme"	Na. Muthukumar	Madras Youth Choir, Manasi, Monissha	2:34
4.	"Yelelo"	Yugabharathi	Benny Dayal, Sandhya, Andrea Jeremiah	4:42
5.	"Nanban"	Yugabharathi	Vijay Prakash	5:14
6.	"Life In Marina" (Instrumental)	–	–	3:44
Total length:				25:45

== Critical reception ==
Pavithra Srinivasan of Rediff.com rated Marina 3/5 stating that it is "worth a watch." N. Venkateswaran of The Times of India gave the film the same rating and wrote that "Director Pandiraj does, and comes up with a fairly engaging screenplay. He details with some depth some of their lives, and wins hearts all the way — much like in his debut film Pasanga. His dialogues are crackling with wit and humour and he draws the best performances from his ensemble cast. On the contrary, Sify's critic dismissed the film as "boring."

== Box office ==
According to an estimate made by Businessworld, the film was made on a budget of ₹1.35 crore (US$140,000) and grossed approximately ₹8 crore (US$830,000).
