= Sattendru Maarudhu Vaanilai =

- Theatrical release poster
- Directed by: Babu Vijay
- Written by: Babu Vijay
- Produced by: B. V. Shrmila
- Starring: Jai; Yogi Babu; Meenakshi Govindarajan
- Cinematography: Richard M. Nathan
- Edited by: Darling Richardson
- Music by: Girishh Gopalakrishnan
- Production company: BV Frames
- Release date: 15 May 2026
- Running time: 120 minutes
- Country: India
- Language: Tamil

Sattendru Maarudhu Vaanilai (transl. The weather has changed suddenly) is a 2026 Indian Tamil-language romantic thriller film written and directed by Babu Vijay, in his debut. The film, starring Jai, Yogi Babu, and Meenakshi Govindarajan, was released on 15 May 2026.

== Plot ==
Ramachandran, an orphaned computer programmer, lives with his close friends. Janaki is the daughter of a government minister; her father wants her to become the second wife of an influential politician. Ramachandran encounters Janaki several times: in a pub, on the street, at social events. He flirts with her, falls in love, and they eventually marry.

Chakravarthy is the owner of several luxury hotels and resorts. He secretly films couples on their honeymoons and sells their intimate videos on illegal websites. Ramachandran and Janaki ultimately find themselves caught in this situation, and the film chronicles their struggle to escape.

== Cast ==
- Jai as Ramachandran
- Yogi Babu as Yogi
- Meenakshi Govindarajan as Janaki
- Ramachandra Raju as Chakravarthy
- Sathyan as IT Manager
- Sriman as Hamumanth Reddy
- Adithya Kathir as Ramachandran's friend
- Saravana Subbiah as Minister Eashwar

== Production ==
Sattendru Maarudhu Vaanilai marks the directorial debut of Babu Vijay, previously an assistant director under A. R. Murugadoss. He described it as being influenced by the films of Vetrimaaran, Murugadoss and Mani Ratnam. The film's title is derived from a lyric from the song "Nenjukkul Peidhidum" from Vaaranam Aayiram (2008). Cinematography was handled by Richard M. Nathan and editing by Darling Richardson.

== Soundtrack ==
The music was composed by Girishh Gopalakrishnan. The song "Akkadi" and the title song "Sattendru Maarudhu Vaanilai" were released as singles in February and March 2026, respectively. The song "Naan Veezhven Endru Ninaithaiyo" incorporates lines from the eponymous poem by Subramania Bharati.

Track listing
No.	Title	Lyrics	Singer(s)	Length
1.	"Sattendru Maarudhu Vaanilai"	Snehan	Shreya Ghoshal, M. S. Krsna
2.	"Akkadi"	Girishh Gopalakrishnan, M. S. Krsna	Deva
3.	"Uyire Uyire"	Snehan	Jairam Balasubramanian
4.	"Naan Veezhven Endru Ninaithaiyo"	Subramania Bharati, Madurai Souljour	Madurai Souljour, Girishh Gopalakrishnan

== Release and reception ==
Sattendru Maarudhu Vaanilai was released on 15 May 2026. Abhinav Subramanian of The Times of India wrote, "Sattendru Maarudhu Vaanilai is trying to be a dark thriller, a sweet romance, and a Thalapathy fan exercise all at once. None of those modes really stick". Prashanth Vallavan of Cinema Express wrote, "Sattendru Maarudhu Vaanilai is what happens when a typical Tamil murder mystery screenplay gets affected by the 'brainrot' virus proliferated by short form content, and mutates into a two-hour-long chain of one bizarre decision after another". Dina Thanthi and Dinamalar gave the film mixed reviews.
