= Girishh Gopalakrishnan =

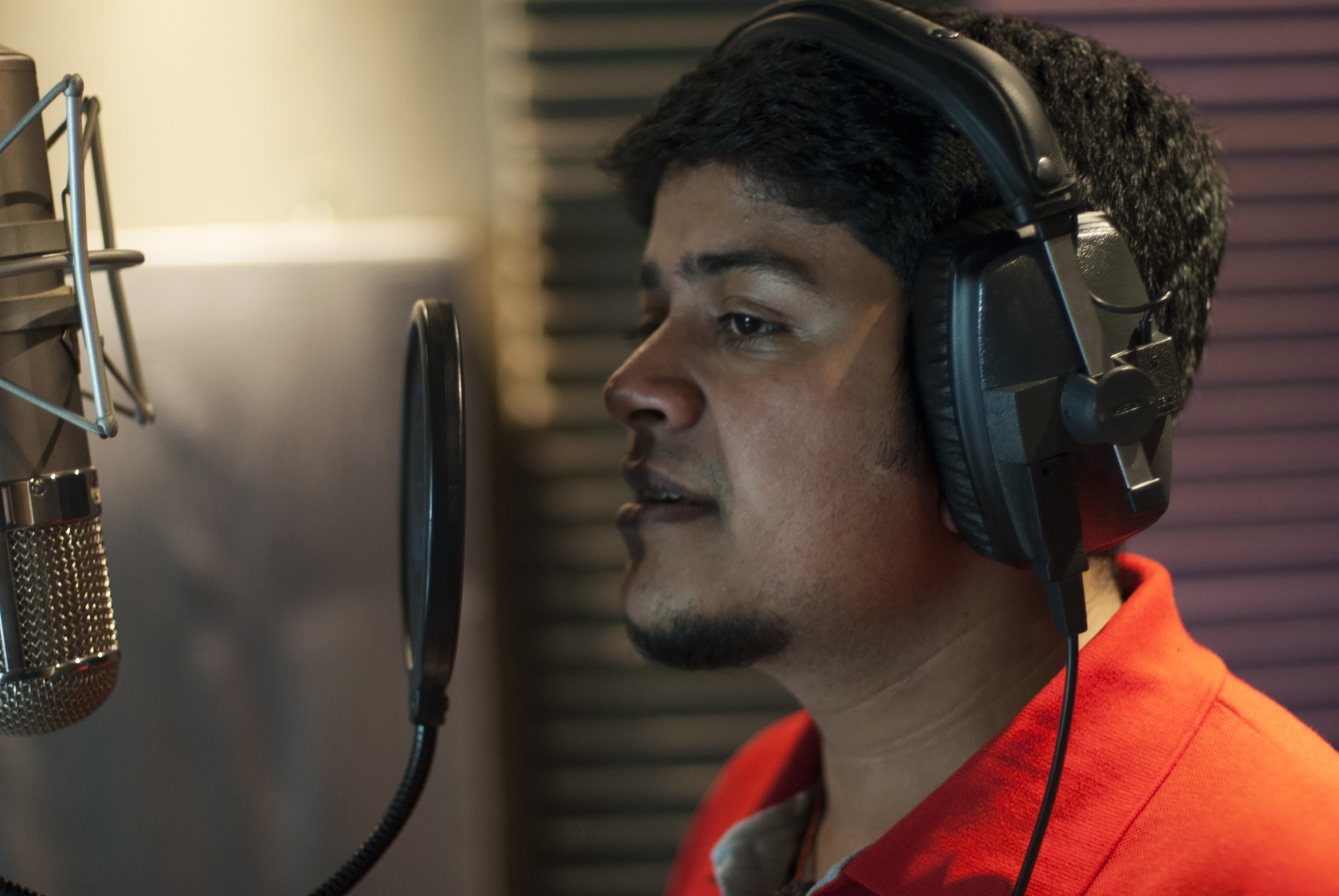
- Composer of Vidiyum Munn, Marina & Yaar Bharathi

Background information
- Born: Girishh Gopalakrishnan; 26 September 1986 (age 39); Tanjore, Tamil Nadu, India
- Origin: Tamil Nadu, India
- Occupations: Film Composer, Music Director, Music Producer, Arranger, Lyricist.
- Instruments: Guitar, keyboard/piano.
- Years active: 2011–present

Girishh Gopalakrishnan (born 26 September 1986) is an Indian music composer, music producer, singer in the Tamil film industry. He made his debut as a music director with the Tamil film, Marina directed by Pandiraj.

== Early life and career ==
Girishh was born on 26 September 1986 in Tanjore, Tamil Nadu. He is a student of violinist Lalgudi Jayaraman and started learning music under him from the age of 8. He also trained in western classical music under the late Das Daniel.

Girishh graduated as an engineer in 2008 and went on to do his master's degree in music composition at Leeds College of Music. He then continued to stay on in the UK working as a freelance Composer and Conductor for Orchestras, composing music for film, dance and theatre productions.

In October 2011, Girishh got a chance to meet Pandiraj through Sivakarthikeyan, who eventually signed him on to compose music for Marina, as he required an international sound to the film's score. The music for Marina released on 9 January 2012, to extremely positive reviews, critical acclaim and popularity, with the song "Vanakkam Chennai" and its promo video going viral. The film's soundtrack and background score received critical acclaim.

After Marina, Girishh worked on director Balaji K. Kumar's "Vidiyum Munn", an experimental thriller. The film features the song "Penne" sung by British Singer Susheela Raman.

"Vidiyum Munn" released on 29 November 2013, to rave reviews for the film, the film's music and the background score, which was recorded in Manchester, UK with players from the BBC Philharmonic Orchestra.

== Filmography ==
=== Film soundtracks ===
Year	Film	Languages	Notes
2012	Marina •	Tamil	
2013	Vidiyum Munn •	Tamil	
2015	Sadhuram 2 •	Tamil	
2017	Kalki •	Tamil	
2017	The House Next Door • Aval	Hindi	
2017	The House Next Door • Aval	Tamil	
2019	Iruttu •	Tamil	
2020	Nishabdham • Silence	Telugu; Tamil	BGM only
2020	Mookuthi Amman •	Tamil	
2021	Netrikann •	Tamil	
2022	Veetla Vishesham •	Tamil	
2022	Super Senior Heroes •	Tamil	Direct release on Sun TV
2023	Kolai •	Tamil	Also lyrics for "Yaar Nee"
2026	Sattendru Maarudhu Vaanilai •	Tamil	

Upcoming films

- Pakshi
- Address (2025)

=== Albums ===
Year	Album details	Track list
2015	Yaar Bharathi? - Kaadhalan Bharathi	1. Chandramadhi - Pachchai Kuzhandhaiyadi; 2. Valli Paattu - Entha Neramum; 3. Ninnaiye Rathiyendru; 4. Theerthak Karaiyinile; 5. Paayum Oli; 6. Ninnaiye Rathiyendru (Karaoke Version); 7. Chandramadhi (Karaoke Version)

- The films are listed in order that the music released, regardless of the dates the film released.
- The year next to the title of the affected films indicates the release year of the either dubbed or remade version in the named language later than the original version.
- • indicates original language release. Indicates simultaneous makes, if featuring in more languages
- ♦ indicates a remade version, the remaining ones being dubbed versions
