= Papanasam (soundtrack) =

Soundtrack album by Ghibran
- Released: 13 June 2015
- Recorded: 2014–2015
- Genre: Feature film soundtrack
- Length: 34:40
- Language: Tamil
- Label: Think Music
- Producer: Ghibran

Ghibran chronology
Uttama Villain (2015)	Papanasam (2015)	Thoongaa Vanam (2015)

Papanasam is the soundtrack album to the 2015 film of the same name directed by Jeethu Joseph; a remake of his own Drishyam (2013), the film stars Kamal Haasan and Gautami. Ghibran composed the film's music with the soundtrack featured ten songs, accompanying instrumental tracks, and lyrics were provided by Na. Muthukumar. The soundtrack was released through Think Music on 13 June 2015 to positive reviews from critics and Ghibran eventually won the Tamil Nadu State Film Award for Best Music Director for his work in the film.

== Development ==
The film's music was composed by Ghibran. continuing his association with Kamal Haasan after Uttama Villain (2015). Ghibran had been an admirer of Joseph's work since Memories (2013) and having watched Drishyam, the latter had provided the idea of the film during music discussions, informing him that he decided to rely on the basic storyline of Drishyam but would be adapted for the native audience, where the film is set, which provided him a creative job. Unlike Uttama Villian and Vishwaroopam II (2018), which Ghibran composed in his first with Kamal, the latter did not interfere in the musical discussions and the music was eventually provided on behalf of Joseph's vision.

As the second half consisted of intense moments, Ghibran felt that "emotions had to stand out, not the music" which resulted him to underplay the score. Ghibran stated that, the film is both a family drama as well as a suspense thriller and cannot be compared to one specific category. This worked in his favour as he could "play on both emotions and the suspense elements." The climactic sequence did not feature music, as Ghibran wanted to play it subtler and let silence takeaway that particular scene for more emotional impact.

Like Drishyam, the film also featured two songs with lyrics provided by Na. Muthukumar. The song "Yeya En Kottikara" was recorded after the film's puja ceremony in July 2014. Ghibran provided the brief of the song to Sundar Narayana Rao, so that he could incorporate the context of the song, Kamal's characterization and his singing style and the dialect, which had a folk approach to it and tried his best to match all those criteria. The tune was "instantly catchy and nifty" and was composed using Himachali and Pahadi musical style and has "explored the authentic Pahadi splendours that required a slightly higher scale to do justice". Malavika Anilkumar, who was the title winner of the seventh season of Star Singer, was chosen to provide vocals for the female counterpart.

The two songs were recorded by November 2014, while Ghibran worked on the background score, the following month. It was performed by the Sofia Session Orchestra conducted by Ghibran in early 2015, which was responsible for the instrumental tracks.

== Release ==
The track list was released on 10 June 2015, that accompanied the two songs and its karaoke versions, while also includes six instrumental tracks from the score. The album was launched on 13 June 2015, at the Suryan FM 93.5 radio station in Chennai, with the presence of the film's cast and crew.

== Reception ==
The album received positive reviews from music critics. Sharanya CR of The Times of India, praised the songs with mentioning "Yeya En Kottikara" as "soothing number", whilst also praising the efforts for the background score, calling "Ghibran is on a roll!". Karthik Srinivasan of Milliblog described it as a"short, thematic work by Ghibran." Anupama Subramanian of Deccan Chronicle wrote "Music and background by Ghibran is fitting, and a refreshing aspect of the film is that it doesn’t demand much choreography." Sify wrote "Ghibran's background score is a big asset to the movie which brings the audience to the edge of the seat". S. Saraswathi of Rediff.com wrote Ghibran's music "quietly blend in while adding an intensity that draws you into every frame, empathising with the characters."

== Track listing ==
All lyrics are written by Na. Muthukumar.

No.	Title	Singer(s)	Length
1.	"Yeya En Kottikara"	Sundar Narayana Rao, Malavika Anilkumar	05:08
2.	"Vinaa Vinaa"	Hariharan	05:51
3.	"Papanasam – Theme Music"	Instrumental	03:08
4.	"Kill For Life"	Instrumental	01:47
5.	"The Bond Of Family"	Instrumental	01:26
6.	"A Sinking Car"	Instrumental	01:51
7.	"Police Investigation"	Instrumental	02:30
8.	"This Is Me – Suyambulingam"	Instrumental	01:59
9.	"Yeya En Kottikara"	Karaoke	05:08
10.	"Vinaa Vinaa"	Karaoke	05:49

== Accolades ==
Award	Date of Ceremony (Note: Date is linked to the article about the awards held that year, wherever possible.)	Category	Recipient(s) and nominee(s)	Result	Ref.
Tamil Nadu State Film Awards	6 March 2024	Best Music Director	Ghibran (Note: also for Uttama Villain (2015))	Won	
