= Anitha Karthikeyan =

Indian playback singer

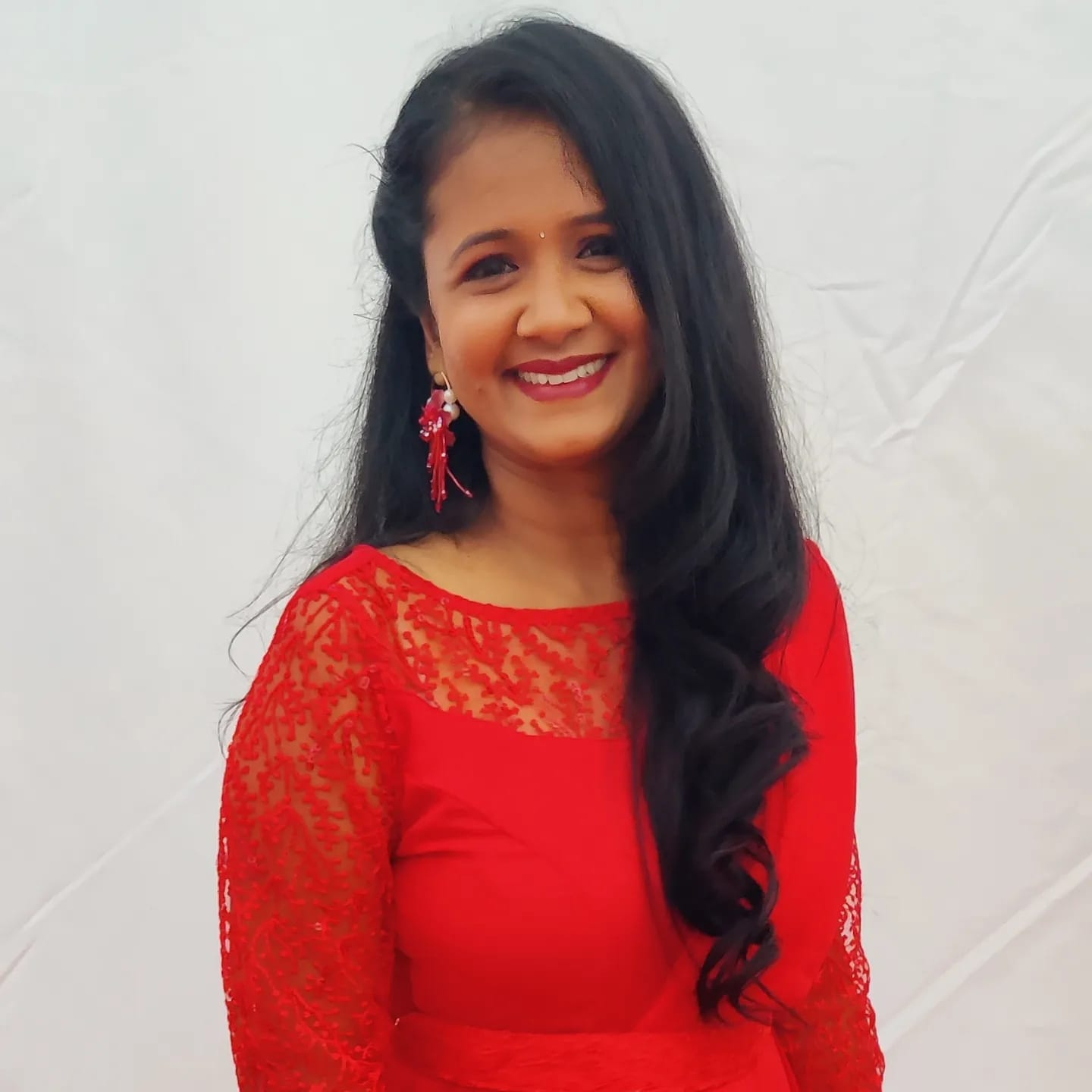

Background information
- Born: Chennai, Tamil Nadu, India
- Occupation: Playback singer
- Instrument: Voice
- Years active: 1997 – current

Anitha Karthikeyan is an Indian Playback singer. She has sung more than 500 film songs mostly in south Indian languages including Tamil, Telugu, Malayalam and Kannada. It was the song "Mannavane Mannavane" from the 2015 Tamil movie Puli which "has brought her to the limelight." In the beginning, she sang more melodious and classical based tune songs, she later became known for fast track hit numbers. In 2010, she won the Vijay Music award in the popular mass song category for the song "Vaada Vaada Paiya" from Tamil film Kacheri Arambam. She is also known for singing Jingles for TV commercials. Besides, she has sung title track for different TV Serials including the "Achuvellam Pacharasi Mavilakku" for Kula Deivam (TV series). She has performed in numerous live concerts in India and abroad including in Ilaiyaraaja’s orchestras.

== Early life and education ==
Anitha Karthikeyan was born in Chennai, Tamil Nadu. She began her school education at the Saraswathi Vidyalaya School, Chennai. Simultaneously, she learned western music lessons and Hindustani classical music. She continued her higher education at Ethiraj College for Women, Chennai where she completed her BSc in computer science in 2003. She later graduated with MSc in information technology from M.O.P Vaishnav College for Women, Chennai in 2005. Since her childhood she was participating in different musical competitions. However, it was during her studies at Ethiraj College, she developed her singing skills.

== Singing career ==
After completing her higher education, she started her professional career as a software engineer in Chennai. When the Vijay TV's Super Singer Season 1 was announced in 2006, she became one of its contestants. She won the title "Viewer's Choice super singer" which introduced her to the music world, and changed her career as a playback singer. In 2007, she made her debut in the movie Marudhamalai by D. Imman, the music director. Under his musical composition, she sang various genres. She soon started singing under the compositions of different music directors in Tamil, Telugu and Kannada. She got a chance to meet music director Ilaiyaraaja when she became a part of backing vocals during one of his musical compositions for a Kannada movie. She later rendered classical hits in the Telugu movie Sri Rama Rajyam under the musical composition of laiyaraaja. She has sung 25 songs for Ilaiyaraaja alone. Some of Anitha's popular songs include "Putham Puthu Kaalai" (Megha), "Kattikida" (Kaaki Sattai), "Idhedho Bagunde" (Mirchi), "Loveaa" (Uttama Villain), "Senga Soola Kara" (Vaagai Sooda Vaa), "Shokku Sundari" (Ainthaam Padai) and "Amma Wake Me Up" (Vathikuchi).

== Discography ==
The discography of Anitha Karthikeyan includes

Year	Film	Language	Songs	Music director	Co-singers
2007	Marudhamalai	Tamil	Marudhamalai	D. Imman	D. Imman
2007	Marudhamalai	Tamil	Marudhamalai II	D. Imman	Madhu Balakrishnan
2007	Puli Varudhu	Tamil	Oru Murai	Srikanth Deva	Madhu Balakrishnan
2009	Odipolama	Tamil	Vaalu Paiyane	D. Imman	Ranjith
2009	Kannukulle	Tamil	Vaanambaadigal	Ilaiyaraaja	Priya, Surmukhi Raman
2010	Kacheri Arambam	Tamil	Vaada Vaada	D. Imman	M. L. R. Karthikeyan, Watta Bottles
2010	Thottupaar	Tamil	Seema Sirikki	Srikanth Deva	Jassie Gift
2010	Suryakaanti	Kannada	Swalpa Soundu	Ilaiyaraaja	Ilaiyaraja, Roshini, megha, Suvvi, Reshma, Neha
2010	Gaayam 2	Telugu	Masaka Venaka	Ilaiyaraaja	
2010	Swayamvara	Kannada	Milky Baby	Manikanth Kadri	Balu Thangachan, Sindhuja Rajaram
2010	Prithvi	Kannada	Haagella Nee Nodabeda	Manikanth Kadri	Haricharan
2011	Vaagai Sooda Vaa	Tamil	Senga Soola Kaara	Ghibran	
2011	Sri Rama Rajyam	Tamil	Mangalam Ramunaku	Ilaiyaraaja	Chinmayi
2011	Sri Rama Rajyam	Telugu	Mangalam Ramunaku	Ilaiyaraaja	Keertana S K
2011	Ponnar Shankar	Tamil	Annanmar Kathai	Ilaiyaraaja	Madhu Balakrishnan, Hemambika
2011	Mr. Perfect	Telugu	Dhol Dhol Dhol Bhaaje (Ghallu Ghallu Mani)	Devi Sri Prasad	M. L. R. Karthikeyan
2011	Azhagarsamiyin Kuthirai	Tamil	Adiye Ivale	Ilaiyaraaja	Naresh Iyer
2011	Thambikottai	Tamil	Noorandu Vazhga	D. Imman	Thanjai Selvi, Snehan, Lenin Bharathi, Hemambika, Murugan, Iyyappan, Master Regan, Senthildass Velayutham
2011	Mankatha	Tamil	Vilaiyaadu Mankatha	Yuvan Shankar Raja	Suchitra, Premgi Amaren, Ranjith, Yuvan Shankar Raja
2011	Puli Vesham	Tamil	Top Glass	Srikanth Deva	Surmukhi Raman, M. L. R. Karthikeyan, Srikanth Deva
2011	Konjam Sirippu Konjam Kobam	Tamil	Valaivugalale	Sunil Xavier	
2011	Oththigai	Tamil	Machakkari	John Peter	Vijay Prakash
2011	Vellore Maavattam	Tamil	Kannala Parkurathum	Sundar C. Babu	
2012	Kalakalappu	Tamil	Ava Thirumbipaarthu	Vijay Ebenezer	Karthik
2012	Crazy Loka	Kannada	Naavu Aaramagiddare	Manikanth Kadri	Benny Dayal, Janani
2012	Saattai	Tamil	Adi Raangi	D. Imman	Santhosh Hariharan
2012	Prasad	Kannada	Ondu Aramane	Ilaiyaraaja	Ilaiyaraaja, Rita, Surmukhi Raman
2012	Kandathum Kanathathum	Tamil	Asukku Buskku Aasai Dosai Appala Vadai	Charlie V A	
2012	Sengathu Bhoomiyilae	Tamil	Oram Po Oram Po	Ilaiyaraaja	R. Prasanna, Priya Himesh, Haricharan
2012	Sengathu Bhoomiyilae	Tamil	Sikkikichu Sikkichu	Ilaiyaraaja	R.Prasanna, Priya, Haricharan
2012	Pandi Oliperukki Nilayam	Tamil	Kettukodi Urumimelam (remix)	Kavi Periya Thambi	M. L. R. Karthikeyan
2012	Daruvu	Telugu	Athiri Chirabara	Vijay Antony	Hemachandra
2012	Kazhugu	Tamil	Vaadi Vaadi	Yuvan Shankar Raja	Suvi Suresh, Pushpavanam Kuppusamy
2013	Mirchi	Telugu	Idhedho Bagundey	Devi Sri Prasad	Vijay Prakash
2013	Gundello Godari	Telugu	Ekkadundhi Naa Kod	Ilaiyaraaja	Mano
2013	Gundello Godari	Tamil	Enga Irukku En Kozhi	Ilaiyaraaja	Mano
2013	Sillunu Oru Sandhippu	Tamil	Adi Aathi	F. S. Faizal	Aalap Raju
2013	Iddarammayilatho	Telugu	Violin Song (girl just)	Devi Sri Prasad	
2013	Alex Pandian	Tamil	Naalu Pakkam	Devi Sri Prasad	Devi Sri Prasad
2013	Karuppampatti	Tamil	Kannamma Chinna Ponnamma	Kannan	Thilaga, Suchitra, Priya
2013	Vathikuchi	Tamil	Amma Wake Me Up	Ghibran	Shruthi Ravi, Shabir Sulthan
2014	Namo Bhootatma	Kannada	Paravasam Paravasam	Farhaan Roshan	Al Rufian
2014	Pulivaal	Tamil	Kichu Kichu	N. R. Raghunanthan	Haricharan
2014	Jamaai	Tamil	Sengaal naaraai	Dhina	
2014	Kaadu	Tamil	Oororam (Female Version)	K	
2014	Megha	Tamil	Putham Puthu Kaalai	Ilaiyaraaja	
2014	Bramman	Tamil	En Uyirin Uyiraga	DeviSri Prasad	Devi Sri Prasad
2015	Puli	Tamil	Mannavanae Mannavanae	DeviSri Prasad	Sooraj Santhosh, Chinmayee, M. L. R. Karthikeyan
2015	Ore Oru Raja Mokka Raja	Tamil	Adidaa Mela Thaalam		Sreerama Chandra
2015	Ore Oru Raja Mokka Raja	Tamil	Poovellam Kettuppar		
2015	Touring Talkies	Tamil	Nenju Porukuthilayae	Ilaiyaraaja	Sharreth
2015	Kaaki Sattai	Tamil	Kattikida	Anirudh Ravichander	M. M. Manasi, Anthony Daasan
2015	Thilagar	Tamil	Oorellam Vettu Satham	Kannan	Mukesh Mohamed
2015	Uttama Villain	Tamil	Loveaa Loveaa	Ghibran	Nivas, Kamal Hassan, Sharanya Gopinath
2015	India Pakistan	Tamil	Vaadi Kutty Lady	Dheena Devarajan	Nivas
2015	Chandi Veeran	Tamil	Kothaani kannala	S. N. Arunagiri	
2016	Kidaari	Tamil	Thalakaalu Puriyalaiyae	Darbuka Siva	Velmurugan
2016	Adra Machan Visilu	Tamil	Thalaivan Purantha Naalu	N. R. Raghunanthan	Diwakar
2016	Oyee	Tamil	Mudinja Oru Kai Paaru	Ilaiyaraaja	R.Prasanna
2017	Kadamban	Tamil	Saama Kodaangi	Yuvan Shankar Raja	Velmurugan, Jayamoorthy
2017	Juliet Lover of Idiot	Telugu	Neekai Vechey	Ratheesh Vega	
2017	Enga Amma Rani	Tamil	Amma Endru	Ilaiyaraaja	Aalap Raju
2018	Nagesh Thiraiyarangam	Tamil	Vaadi Vaadi	Srikanth Deva	Gana Bala
2018	Prema Baraha	Tamil	Rama Rama	Jassie Gift	Haricharan
2018	Prema Baraha	Kannada	Rama Rama	Jassie Gift	Haricharan
2018	Music School	Hindi	IIT to MIT My Song Will Go	Ilaiyaraaja	RS Rakthaksh, K Vasudevan
2018	Appa	Tamil	Nettru Vitta Neril	Ilaiyaraaja	Rita Thyagarajan
2018	Semma Botha Aagathey	Tamil	Itemkaaran	Yuvan Shankar Raja	Ranjith
2018	Seemathurai	Tamil	Karuvalan Kaattukku	Jose Franklin	Sathyaprakash
2019	Sivappu Manjal Pachai	Tamil	Raakaachi Rangamma	Siddhu Kumar	
2019	Thorati	Tamil	Potta Kaadellam	Ved Shankar and Jithin K. Roshan	Manikka Vinayagam, Chinnaponnu, Gowtham Bharadwa
2020	Gillidaa	Tamil	Balley Balley	DeviSri Prasad	S. N. Surendar
2022	Idam Porul Yaeval	Tamil	Eerakkaathae	Yuvan Shankar Raja	Senthildass Velayutham
2023	Maranthen Mannithen	Tamil	Engu Irukku En Kozhi	Ilaiyaraaja	Mano
