= Parachute (TV series) =

- Official Poster
- Genre: Drama thriller
- Written by: Sridhar K.
- Directed by: Rasu Ranjith
- Starring: Krishna; Kishore; Kani Thiru; Shakthi Rithvik; Iyal; Kaali Venkat; Rasu Ranjith; Bava Chelladurai; Sharanya Ramachandran; Inba Ravikumar
- Composer: Yuvan Shankar Raja
- Country of origin: India
- Original language: Tamil
- No. of seasons: 1
- No. of episodes: 5

Production
- Producers: Krishna; K. S. Madhubala
- Cinematography: Om Narayan
- Editor: Richard Kevin
- Running time: 22–25 minutes
- Production company: Tribal Horse Entertainment

Original release
- Network: Disney+ Hotstar
- Release: 29 November 2024

Parachute is a 2024 Indian Tamil-language drama thriller television series directed by Rasu Ranjith, written by Sridhar K. and starring Shakthi Rithvik, Iyal, Krishna, Kani Thiru, Kishore, Kaali Venkat, Rasu Ranjith himself, Bava Chelladurai, Sharanya Ramachandran and Inba Ravikumar.

It was produced by Krishna and K. S. Madhubala under the banner of Tribal Horse Entertainment. It was released on Disney+ Hotstar for its label Hotstar Specials on 29 November 2024 and declared a Streaming Blockbuster.

== Plot ==
Rudra and Varun are siblings who live with their mother Lakshmi, a housewife, and father Shanmugam, a gas cylinder delivery agent. Even with his meager income Shanmugam sends his children to a posh school but is short-tempered and grumpy when behaving with his family members. Him resorting to beating Varun when he does wrong, creates even more hurdles when Rudra and Varun take a small adventure in their father’s bike Parachute, and get into trouble after the bike gets off their hands.

== Cast ==
- Krishna as Kirubakaran, Traffic Police
- Kishore as Shanmugam, Varun and Rudhra's father
- Kani Thiru as Lakshmi, Varun and Rudhra's mother
- Shakthi Rithvik as Varun
- Iyal as Rudhra, Varun's younger sister
- Kaali Venkat as Charles, Varun and Rudhra's neighbour
- Rasu Ranjith as Kola
- Bava Chelladurai as Lakshmi's father, Varun and Rudhra's grandfather
- Sharanya Ramachandran as Kirubakaran's wife
- Inba Ravikumar as Muttai, Kola's friend
- Supergood Subramani as SI Rajan

== Episodes ==
No. overall	No. in season	Title	Directed by	Written by	Original release date
1	1	"A Mother's Nightmare"	Rasu Ranjith	Sridhar K.	29 November 2024
2	1	"Love for Parachute"	Rasu Ranjith	Sridhar K.	29 November 2024
3	1	"Bikes and Bandits"	Rasu Ranjith	Sridhar K.	29 November 2024
4	1	"Kids in Danger"	Rasu Ranjith	Sridhar K.	29 November 2024
5	1	"Love Over Fear"	Rasu Ranjith	Sridhar K.	29 November 2024

== Production ==
=== Development ===
The series was announced by 'Disney+ Hotstar' as a part of Disney+ Hotstar's future slate of content on 31 July 2023. The series is produced by actor Krishna and K. S. Madhubala under the banner of Tribal Horse Entertainment. It was second collaboration with Disney+ Hotstar after Telugu-language series Jhansi (2022–2023). The show directed by Rasu Ranjith, written by Sridhar K., music by Yuvan Shankar Raja, cinematographer by Om Narayan and edited by Richard Kevin.

=== Casting ===
Child actors Shakthi Rithvik and Iyal was cast as Varun and Rudhra. Actors Krishna, Shaam and Kishore was cast as important role. It was supposed to be his first role in a limited series debut for actor Shaam.

=== Release ===
The first one-minute Teaser was released on social media Wednesday 29 October 2024. The first Trailer was released on social media Thursday 14 November 2024, featuring reveal of release date.

The series was scheduled for a worldwide release on 29 November 2024, on Disney+ Hotstar along with dubbed versions in Telugu, Malayalam, Kannada, Hindi, Marathi and Bengali.

== Music ==
Parachute

Soundtrack album by Yuvan Shankar Raja
- Released: 26 November 2024
- Recorded: 2023–2024
- Studios: U1 Records, Chennai
- Genre: Film soundtrack
- Length: 6:20
- Language: Tamil
- Label: Sony Music India
- Producer: Yuvan Shankar Raja

Yuvan Shankar Raja chronology
The Greatest of All Time (2024)	Parachute (2024)	Nesippaya (2025)

Singles from Parachute
- 1. "Aagasa Usaram" Released: 26 November 2024; 2. "Peroliyil" Released: 29 November 2024

The soundtrack of the series was composed by Yuvan Shankar Raja.The audio rights were acquired by Sony Music India.The first single titled "Aagasa Usaram" was released on 26 November 2024. The second single titled "Peroliyil" was released on 29 November 2024.

Track listing
No.	Title	Lyrics	Singer(s)	Length
1.	"Aagasa Usaram"	Mohan Rajan	Yuvan Shankar Raja; Sriram Parthasarathy	3:03
2.	"Peroliyil"	Karthik Netha	Yuvan Shankar Raja; Vijay Yesudas	3:17

== Reception ==
=== Critical response ===
Akshay Kumar of Cinema Express gave 3/5 stars and wrote, "However, the series is praiseworthy for having its heart in the right place and pulling no punches with its opinion on domestic violence and parenting". Kausalya Rachavelpula of The Hans India gave 2.75/5 stars and wrote, "Parachute is a well-crafted series that offers a refreshing take on family dramas".

Raisa Nasreen of Times Now wrote, "Overall, the film manages to keep you invested in the lives of Rudra, Varun, and their reconciliation with their angry, upset yet loving parents".
