= Vennila Veedu =

2014 Indian film by Vetri Mahalingam

- Theatrical release poster
- Directed by: Vetri Mahalingam
- Written by: Iyndhukovilan (dialogues)
- Screenplay by: Vetri Mahalingam
- Story by: Vetri Mahalingam
- Produced by: P. V. Arun
- Starring: Mirchi Senthil; Vijayalakshmi; Srinda
- Cinematography: D. Kannan
- Edited by: V J Sabu Joseph
- Music by: Dhanraj Manickam
- Production company: Adharsh Studio
- Release date: 10 October 2014
- Country: India
- Language: Tamil

Vennila Veedu (transl. Vennila's House) is a 2014 Indian Tamil-language drama film written and directed by Vetri Mahalingam. Produced by P. V. Arun, the film stars Mirchi Senthil, Vijayalakshmi, and Srinda. Cinematography is by D. Kannan, editing by V. J. Sabu Joseph, and the soundtrack is scored by Dhanraj Manickam. The film was released on 10 October 2014. The film is based on a theme similar to the short story "The Necklace" by Guy de Maupassant.

== Plot ==
A village couple, Karthik and Thenmozhi, migrates to the city after their marriage. Karthik works as a manager at a firm, and the couple lives happily, helping everyone around according to their capacity. They have a beautiful daughter, Vennila. Meanwhile, Ilavarasi, a new neighbor in their apartment, arrives. She lives right next door. Ilavarasi is the daughter of a rich moneylender and greedy loan shark who will go to any lengths to get his money back from those who borrowed it. He also loves his daughter and will get anything she points at and do anything for her. As a result of this upbringing, Ilavarasi is an arrogant, spoiled brat of a man and is married to a spineless man who does whatever she bids him. Though Thenu initially has a bad opinion of Ilavarasi, they become friends after Ilavarasi thrashes a stalker who repeatedly harassed Thenu over the phone. Soon, the women become good friends, enjoy each other's company during the day, and spend a lot of time together.

One day, when Karthik and Thenu prepare for a wedding in Karthik's employer's family, Thenu says that she has only simple jewellery and will feel out of place and belittled at such a grand wedding. Since Karthik is not in a comfortable financial state to buy her some jewels, she decides to ask Ilavarasi to borrow her necklace and return it after the ceremony, and Ilavarasi happily obliges. The trouble begins when a chain snatcher steals the necklace on their way back home.

When Ilavarasi's father learns of this, he becomes wild and scolds Thenu, Karthik, and even Ilavarasi. He asks Karthik to lodge a formal complaint with the police. The policemen's attitude towards this issue is lethargic, and they treat it with negligence. Meanwhile, the inspector tells Ilavarasi's father that while Thenu's chain is still intact, his daughter's jewellery is also gone, so Thenu and Karthik could be suspects; this kind of cheating is the latest trend among robbers. Ilavarasi's father hears this and poisons his daughter's mind. Ilavarasi also misjudges certain incidents with Thenu and slowly distances herself. One fine day, Ilavarasi throws a surprise party for Karthik and Thenu's wedding anniversary and gifts an expensive showpiece. However, day after day, Ilavarasi's father continues to abuse them verbally and looks at them as thieves. Then Vennila is suddenly kidnapped, and after some commotion, Karthik learns that Ilavarasi and her father orchestrated the entire kidnapping to see whether they have the money from selling the stolen necklace. Karthik is enraged and argues with Ilavarasi's father, who tells him to find the stolen necklace or at least pay for the jewellery's worth and then talk as much as he pleases. Unable to see his family suffer humiliation, Karthik agrees to give back the money somehow.

Karthik goes to his village to sell a property, leaving Thenu and Vennila at home. However, here too, the land brokers make use of his helpless emergency and buy the land for exactly the amount Karthik owes Ilavarasi's father, much less than the land's actual worth. Karthik returns to the city with the money but is in for a rude shock: he finds that Thenu has committed suicide by hanging herself. He reads her suicide note, where she states that there was a secret camera in the gift that Ilavarasi gave for their anniversary, and their intimate moments were filmed and leaked to the internet. Her stalker had seen this and verbally abused her in public. When Thenu confronted Ilavarasi and her father, he said they had fixed the camera only to monitor their activities to find the truth about the theft, and they were not responsible if the video was leaked online. When she argued with him, he slapped and humiliated her further. Unable to bear all the humiliation, she took this extreme step.

Karthik is blinded by fury after reading this, and when Ilavarasi's father comes to get his money, he gives it to him and asks him to return his dead wife. This leads to an argument, and he is beaten up by goons, but he beats them and finally strangles Ilavarasi's father to death with his own gold chains. Except Ilavarasi, nobody else stops Karthik. The film ends with Karthik crying loudly, looking at the state he left Vennila in.

== Cast ==
- Mirchi Senthil as Karthik
- Vijayalakshmi as Thenmozhi (Thenu)
- Srinda as Ilavarasi
- Muthuraman as Ilavarasi's father
- Baby Mithra as Vennila
- Pandi
- VJ Settai Senthil
- VJ Dindugal Saravanan
- Avan Ivan Ramaraj

Special appearance in promo song

- Sivakarthikeyan
- Premji Amaren
- Venkat Prabhu
- Udhayanidhi Stalin
- Kreshna
- Sreeja Chandran
- Ram Saravana

== Soundtrack ==
The soundtrack album was composed by Dhanraj Manickam. The lyrics were written by Vetri Mahalingam and Kabilan. The track 'Johny Johny' sung by Gana Bala was released as a single on 23 July 2013. The single incorporates the nursery rhymes "Johnny Johnny Yes Papa", "Baa, Baa, Black Sheep" and "Twinkle, Twinkle, Little Star", along with the Airtel song "Ovvoru Friendum Theva Machan". The audio CD was released by director Cheran and received by Thamizhachi Thangapandian and director R. K. Selvamani.

Tracklist

No.	Title	Lyrics	Singer(s)	Length
1.	"Silu Silu Mazhaiyum"	Kabilan	Karthik
2.	"Naayana Oasai Ketten"	Kabilan	Shakthisree Gopalan
3.	"Aala Athattuthu Vayasu"	Kabilan	Velmurugan, Padmalatha
4.	"Johny Johny — Friendsbook Song"	Vetri Mahalingam	Gana Bala, Dhanraj Manickam
5.	"Johny Johny — Gold Craze Song"	Vetri Mahalingam	Sathya Prakash
6.	"Vennila Veetukulla"	Vetri Mahalingam	Veena Arun
7.	"Theme"	Instrumental	Shakthisree Gopalan (humming)

== Critical reception ==
Malini Mannath of The New Indian Express wrote, "A more realistic and a sensitive approach, could have helped to make Vennila Veedu an engaging watch". M. Suganth of The Times of India wrote, "Vennila Veedu could have turned out into a hard-hitting commentary on the vulnerability of the middle class when faced with an existential crisis. But the film we get is underwhelming".
