= Ragalaipuram =

2013 Indian film by Mano

- Directed by: Mano
- Written by: Mano
- Produced by: Ken Media
- Starring: Karunas; Angana Roy
- Cinematography: Velraj, R. Mahalingam
- Edited by: V. T. Vijayan, T. S. Jai
- Music by: Srikanth Deva
- Production company: Ken Media
- Release date: 18 October 2013
- Country: India
- Language: Tamil

Ragalaipuram (transl. Town of chaos) is a 2013 Indian Tamil language comedy drama film written and directed by Mano, which is a remake of the 1991 Malayalam film Aanaval Mothiram. The film features Karunas and Angana Roy in the lead roles, while Kovai Sarala, Pawan, and M. S. Bhaskar play supporting roles. The music was composed by Srikanth Deva. The film opened to mixed reviews upon release on 18 October 2013.

== Plot ==
A coward police officer is told by his family that he has blood cancer. In order to claim the insurance money for his family, he goes on a suicidal mission and takes on criminals single-handedly.

== Cast ==
- Karunas as Velu
- Angana Roy as Kalyani
- Kovai Sarala as Head Constable Ekavalli
- Pawan as Burma Kumar
- M. S. Bhaskar as Commissioner Vincent
- Ken Karunas as Ganesh
- Bharath Reddy as SI Suresh
- Singampuli as Constable Aarumugam
- Mayilsamy
- Manobala as Inspector Arokiyasamy
- O. A. K. Sundar as SI Veerapandi
- Delhi Ganesh as Constable Pandian
- Uma as Velu's mother
- Gnanavel
- Kottaikumar
- Sanjana Singh as SI Shwetha
- Vaiyapuri as Insurance Policy Agent
- Benjamin
- Mumaith Khan as Cameo
- Shakeela as Kuruvamma (Special Appearance)
- Sridhar (Special Appearance - "Obamavum")

== Production ==
The film was first reported in February 2012, with debutant Mano chosen to direct the remake of the 1991 Malayalam film Aanaval Mothiram with Karunas selected to produce the venture and play the lead role while his son Ken made a cameo appearance in the film. Angana Roy was selected to make her debut in the film as lead actress, though Vathikuchi ended up being her first release, owing to the film's delay.

== Soundtrack ==
Soundtrack of the film was scored by Srikanth Deva, while lyrics written by Vairamuthu and Mano. Songs received mixed reviews upon release.

- "Ragalapuram" - V. M. Mahalingam, Grace Karunas
- "Adi Devaloga" - Febin Pillai
- "Obamavum" - Karunas
- "Sudamani" - Srikanth Deva, Grace Karunas
- "Obamavum" Remix - Karunas

== Release ==
The film opened to poor reviews from critics. A critic from The Times of India noted "Ragalaipuram is a textbook example of how to make a lowest common denominator entertainer." Sify wrote that "the Tamil remake is nowhere near the original, as director Mano's jokes fall flat and the comic scenes are so predictable."
