= Dharavi (2018 film) =

Indian film

- Film poster
- Directed by: Pavithran
- Written by: Pavithran
- Produced by: Mumbai Nallarasan; Balasubramanian
- Starring: Satheesh; Balu; Sunu Lakshmi; Prabhu Satish
- Cinematography: Manikandan
- Edited by: V. T. Vijayan
- Music by: Abhay Pavithran
- Production company: ARS International
- Release date: 2 March 2018
- Country: India
- Language: Tamil

Dharavi is a 2018 Indian Tamil-language film written and directed by Pavithran, starring Satheesh, Balu, Sunu Lakshmi, and Prabhu Satish. It was released on 2 March 2018.

== Cast ==
- Satheesh
- Balu
- Sunu Lakshmi
- Prabhu Satish

== Production ==
Dharavi marked the return of Pavithran to direction after a hiatus. His son Abhay, who previously composed music for advertisements, made his feature film composing debut. The film was shot in places such as Dharavi and Chalakudy.

== Release and reception ==
Dharavi was released in theatres on 2 March 2018, in defiance of a strike declared by the Tamil Film Producers Council against digital service providers such as Qube and UFO charging producers exorbitantly. Pavithran defended releasing the film, saying the release date had been decided beforehand and the film's failure to release as planned would result in losses as he had a loan to repay. Cinema Vikatan criticised the story, screenplay, comedy and dubbing. Cinema Express wrote that the film was "very much a masochistic exercise, and one which it's near impossible to write about in any meaningful way". Tamil Cine Talk also gave a negative review, and wrote that the CBI should investigate whether the film was really directed by Pavithran, or someone else using his name.
