= Megha (2014 film) =

2014 Indian film by Karthik Rishi

- Directed by: Karthik Rishi
- Produced by: Albert J S. Selvakumar
- Starring: Ashwin Kakumanu; Srushti Dange; Angana Roy
- Cinematography: R. B. Gurudev
- Edited by: Ram Sudharsan
- Music by: Ilaiyaraja
- Production company: GB Studio
- Distributed by: JSK Film Corporation
- Release date: 22 August 2014
- Country: India
- Language: Tamil

Megha is a 2014 Indian Tamil language romantic action film written and directed by Karthik Rishi, a former associate of Subramaniam Siva. Jointly produced by Albert James and S. Selvakumar, the film stars Ashwin Kakumanu, Srushti Dange and Angana Roy, while Jayaprakash, Ravi Prakash, Aadukalam Naren, Meera Krishnan, and Nithya make up the supporting cast. The film's soundtrack and background score were composed by Ilaiyaraaja. The film released on 29 August 2014. It was a box-office success and its songs received praised.

== Synopsis ==
Mugilan is a lovable and kind middle-class man who works as a forensic officer. He falls in love with Meghavathy Srinivasan aka Megha, who comes from a rich family background. Megha slowly starts developing feelings for him, and one day, she finally reciprocates his love. But later, she also mysteriously disappears on the same day; the reason being is that Mugil's work leads him to incriminating evidence against Joseph Fernando, the police officer who is touted to be the next Police Commissioner of Chennai. Joseph had murdered Officer Raghavan, as he had considered him a threat to his promotion, but discovers that Mugil is on his tracks; hence, Joseph tries to frame Mugil for murder and rape of Megha. Now it is up to Mugil to find his love. Their love undergoes many twists and turns, but how they reunite forms the rest of the story.

== Cast ==
- Ashwin Kakumanu as Mugilan (Mugil)
- Srushti Dange as Meghavathy Srinivasan (Megha)
- Angana Roy as Thulasi
- Aadukalam Naren as Joseph Fernando
- Vijayakumar as Officer R. Raghavan
- Jayaprakash as Jayakumar
- Y. G. Mahendran
- Ravi Prakash as Srinivasan
- Nithya as Mugilan's mother
- Meera Krishnan as Megha's mother
- Sashikumar Subramani as Mani
- Sai Prashanth as Mugilan's friend
- Yuvina Parthavi as Yuvi
- Munishkanth as Joseph Fernando's henchmen
- Shamili Sukumar as Megha's friend
- S. Selvakumar

== Soundtrack ==
The film's soundtrack was composed by Ilaiyaraaja. The album features seven tracks, one of which was "Putham Pudhu Kaalai" from the film Alaigal Oivathillai which was remastered in this film. In an interview, Purushothaman, a long time associate of Ilaiyaraaja revealed that "Putham Pudhu Kaalai" was originally recorded for the film "Maruthani" supposed to be directed by Mahendran. The movie was never made and the song was made as part of the Alaigal Oivathillai LP Record. Ilaiyaraaja himself had sung two songs in the film and his son Yuvan Shankar Raja had rendered two songs. Ilaiyaraaja stated that he agreed to compose the music since he liked the story and the screenplay. Apart from "Puthum Pudhu Kaalai", the lyrics for other songs were written by Na. Muthukumar and Palani Bharathi. Putham Puthu Kalai song reached 99Million hits in YouTube as one of the highest record in Ilayaraja songs.

The music was well received by critics. The New Indian Express called Ilaiyaraja's songs and the score "the film's strength", and Sify wrote, "Ilaiyaraaja owns most of scenes in the movie with his background score and is indeed a backbone for propelling the narration in the screenplay".

Soundtrack Details
| Song title | Singer(s) | Lyricist |
|---|---|---|
| "Mugilo Megamo" | Yuvan Shankar Raja, Ramya NSK | Na. Muthukumar |
| "Chellam Konjum" | Yuvan Shankar Raja, Ramya NSK | Palani Bharathi |
| "Enna Vendum" | Karthik, Priyadarshini | Na. Muthukumar |
| "Jeevane Jeevane" | Ilaiyaraaja | Palani Bharathi |
| "Puthum Pudhu Kaalai" | Anitha Karthikeyan | Gangai Amaran |
| "Kalvane Kalvane" | Haricharan, Ramya NSK | Na. Muthukumar |
| "Mugilo Megamo" | Ilaiyaraaja | Na. Muthukumar |

== Critical reception ==
The New Indian Express wrote, "The pace of the movie is too leisurely for a crime thriller. Also, not much importance is given to the crafting of the investigation episodes as has been given to the romantic interludes. One can feel a sense of imbalance in the narration as it shifts from one to the other". Sify gave a more positive review, writing, "Megha is an attempt that stands out from the run-of-the-mill template with an innovative screenplay".
