= Mirchi Senthil =

Indian Tamil actor, television presenter, radio jockey (born 1978)

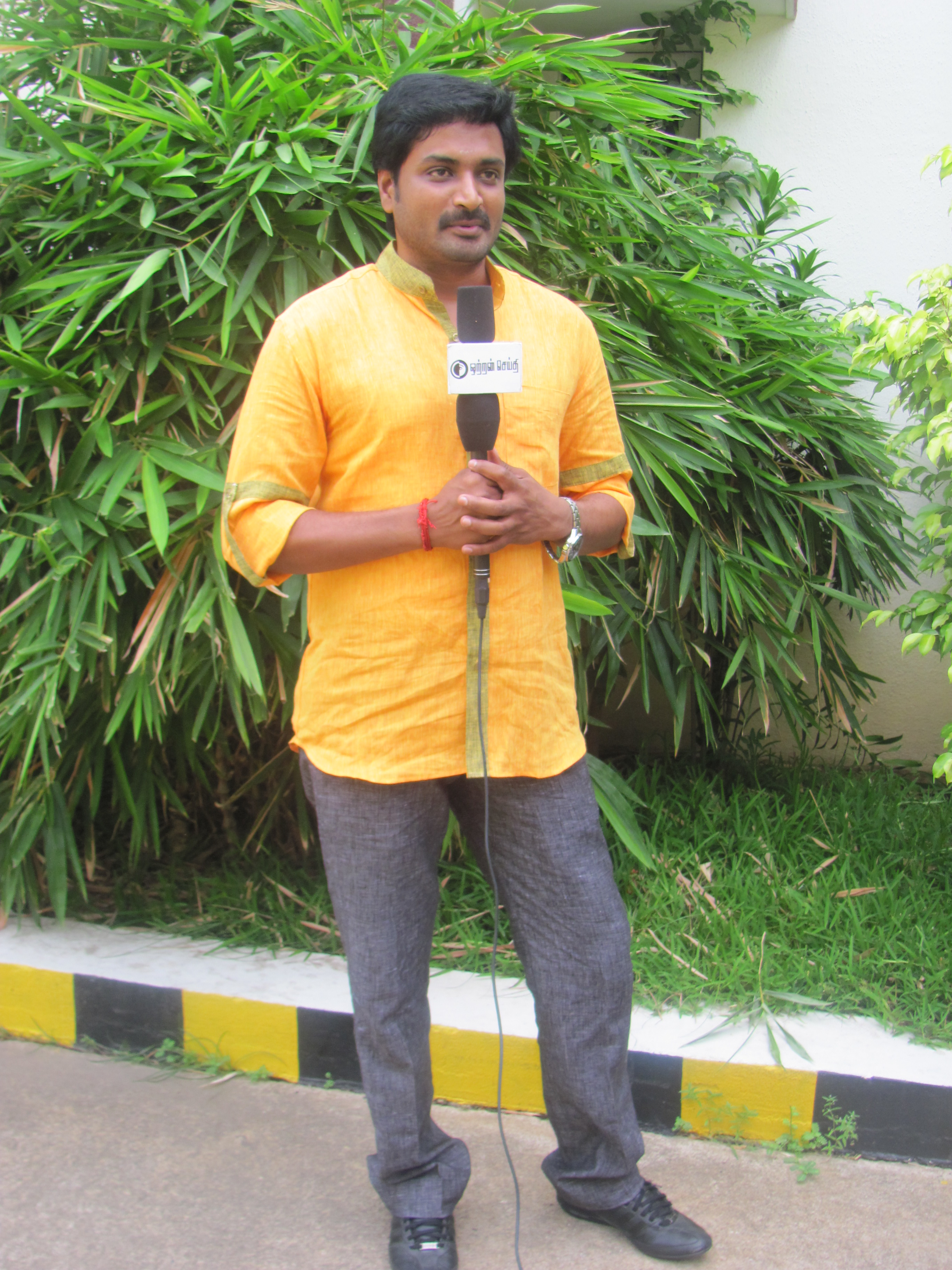
- Senthil at Vennila Veedu Audio Release
- Born: Senthil Kumar; 18 October 1978 (age 47); Chennai, Tamil Nadu, India
- Other name: Mirchi Senthil
- Education: Madurai Kamaraj University
- Occupations: Actor; television presenter; radio jockey
- Years active: 2003 – present
- Spouse: Sreeja Chandran (m. 2014)
- Children: 1

YouTube information
- Channel: Senthil Sreeja Originals
- Years active: 2007– Present
- Subscribers: 319 thousand
- Views: 60.14 million
- Last updated: 20 March 2024

Senthil Kumar (born 18 October 1978), popularly known as Mirchi Senthil, is an Indian actor, television presenter, radio jockey and voice actor. His career began as a radio jockey with the radio station Radio Mirchi. He performed in the lead character Saravanan in STAR Vijay's sensational serial Saravannan Meenatchi and made his debut as a film actor in Thavamai Thavamirundhu. He continued acting in lead roles in Sengathu Bhoomiyilae, Kan Pesum Vaarthaigal, Vennila Veedu and more.

== Personal life ==
Senthil was born in Chennai on 18 October 1978 to S. Govindan and Premavathy. He studied at Don Bosco Higher Secondary School, Chennai and completed his Bachelor of Commerce degree at Pachaiyappa's College, Chennai, as well as his Master of Finance and Control degree at Madurai Kamaraj University. He had a brief career stint in the banking industry before he moved on to the media.

He married his co-star of Madurai & Saravanan Meenatchi Tamil serials fame Malayalam-Tamil actress Sreeja Chandran on 2 July 2014 in a private function in Tirupathi. Senthil confirmed his marriage with Sreeja on his radio show Neenga Naan Raja Sir on 8 July 2014. His sudden marriage announcement created a buzz amongst their thousands of worldwide fans celebrating their marriage. Their son, Sree Vallabh Dev, was born on 4 January 2023.

== Career ==
=== Radio ===
Senthil joined Radio Mirchi, Chennai as a Radio Jockey in 2003 and performed various roles such as Radio producer, EP and Programming Head. Later, he moved to Coimbatore to head Coimbatore Radio Mirchi for 4 years. He has hosted many shows like Mirchi Gold, Mirchi Bazaar, Pettai Raap and Love Talkies. He presented the program Neenga Naan Raja Sir, which is a special on Ilaiyaraaja's music that was aired between 9 PM and 11 PM from Monday to Saturday. This was a very popular program and was acknowledged and endorsed by Ilaiyaraaja himself. In 2016 May, he finished that show and started a new show called "Sentilin Sutta Kadhai" (Senthil's stolen stories), which tells interesting short moral stories from around the world. He currently completed 20 years on radio jockey journey on Radio Mirchi.

=== Television ===
Senthil played the lead character in the successful television serial titled Madurai in STAR Vijay telecasted from 2007 to 2009. Following the success of this serial, Senthil played the lead character by the name Saravanan again in another sensational serial Saravanan Meenatchi in STAR Vijay. Senthil rose to fame following his performances in these two serials and is very well known for his character named Saravanan.

Senthil has performed in a micro-serial 777 for Polimer TV, which was directed by the movie director Manobala.

Apart from the serials, Senthil has hosted a number of shows for STAR Vijay. He hosted a weekly movie review show Tamil Cinema Indha Vaaram in which he discussed the movies along with the cast and crew of the movie. Senthil has conducted a game show for women by the name Boxing for Polimer TV.

=== Film ===
Senthil made his Tamil film debut in the 2005 film Thavamai Thavamirundhu, in which he played the elder brother of director Cheran. He was nominated for the Filmfare Awards for Best Supporting Actor. He got his first lead role in the movie Sengathu Bhoomiyilae. He continued to act in lead roles in films like Kan Pesum Vaarthaigal, Pappali, Vennila Veedu, Rombha Nallavan Da Nee, etc. These films, however, did not fare well at the box office.

== Filmography ==
=== As actor ===
Year	Film	Role	Notes
2005	Thavamai Thavamirundhu	Ramanathan	Nominated, Filmfare Award for Best Supporting Actor – Tamil
2007	Evano Oruvan	Sridhar's Friend	
2007	Chennai 600028	Radio Mirchi RJ Senthil Kumar	Cameo Appearance
2012	Sengathu Bhoomiyilae	Chinna Samy	
2013	Kan Pesum Vaarthaigal	Mahesh	
2014	Vallavanukku Pullum Aayudham	Raja	
2014	Pappali	Karthik	
2014	Vennila Veedu	Karthik	
2015	Rombha Nallavan Da Nee	Bhaskar	
2020	Soorarai Pottru	Radio Mirchi RJ Senthil Kumar	Cameo Appearance
2022	Munnarivaan	Hero's Friend	Filming

=== As Radio Jockey ===
Show	Year	Timings	Notes
Mirchi Gold	2003 to 2007	9PM to 11PM	This show played the songs from old Tamil movies.
Mirchi Bazaar	2005 to 2007	11AM to 2PM	This was a ladies special program. Senthil co-hosted this with RJ Deva.
Pettai Raap	2003 to 2006	4PM	This program was aired on Sundays.
Neenga Naan Raja Sir	2010 to 2015	9PM to 11PM	This show plays the best of Ilaiyaraaja's songs from 80s
Mirchi Sutta Kadhai	2015 Onwards	9PM to 11PM	

- Love Talkies is a unique concept in radio in which stories and characters are created and played along with the Tamil movie songs. Senthil has been a part of many radio movies.

=== Appearance in Television ===
Year	Serial	Role	Notes
2007–2009	Madurai	Seigai Saravanan	Star Vijay
2010	Kallikattu Pallikoodam	Bala Murugan	Star Vijay
2011–2013	Saravannan Meenatchi Season 1	RJ Saravanan	Star Vijay
2012	Micro-serial 777		Polimer TV
2016	Achcham Thavir	Contestant	Game Show; Star Vijay
2016–2017	Mappillai	Senthil Kumar	Star Vijay
2017	Kalyanam Conditions Apply	Senthil	Web series
2018–2020	Naam Iruvar Namakku Iruvar	Mayan / Aravind (Dual Role)	Star Vijay
2020	Kalyanam Conditions Apply 2.0	Senthil	Web series
2020–2022	Naam Iruvar Namakku Iruvar	Mayan / Maaran (Dual Role)	Star Vijay
2020	Heart 2 Heart	Senthil	Web Series
2020	Kalyanam Conditions Apply 3.0	Senthil	Web Series
2021–2022	Junior Super Star Season 4	Judge	Reality Show; Zee Tamil
2021–2022	Jagamae Thandiram Kadhaigal	Presenter / Host	Reality Show; Colors Tamil
2023–2026	Anna	Shanmugam / Saravanan (Dual role)	Zee Tamil
2023	Seetha Raman	Shanmugam (Cameo)	Zee Tamil
2025–2026	Police Police	SI Raja	Web series; JioHotstar
2026	Idhayam - Season 2	Shanmugam (Cameo)	Zee Tamil

=== As Television presenter ===
- A song review show Gaanamum Kaatchiyum for the TV channel Puthuyugam
- Tamil Cinema Indha Vaaram for Star Vijay
- Kadal Movie Special for Star Vijay
- Paradesi Movie Special for Star Vijay
- Ajith special for Star Vijay
- Dhanush special for Star Vijay
- Sembaruthi Vetri Vizha for Zee Tamil

== Awards and honours ==
Year	Award	Category	Work	Result
2005	Filmfare Awards South	Filmfare Award for Best Supporting Actor – Tamil	Thavamai Thavamirundhu	Nominated
2012	Mylapore Academy Awards	Best Actor	Saravanan Meenatchi	Won
2014	Vijay Television Awards	Vijay Television Awards for Favourite Actor	Saravanan Meenatchi	Won
2014	Vijay Television Awards	Vijay Television Awards for Favourite Screen Pair	Saravanan Meenatchi	Won
2017	Vijay Television Awards	Vijay Television Awards for Favourite Screen Pair	Mappillai	Won
2017	Vijay Television Awards	Vijay Television Awards for Favourite Actor	Mappillai	Won
