= Touring Talkies (2015 film) =

2015 Indian film by S.A.Chandrasekaran

- Directed by: S. A. Chandrasekaran
- Written by: S. A. Chandrasekaran
- Dialogues by: Vinayath Krishna
- Produced by: Shoba Chandrasekaran
- Starring: S. A. Chandrasekaran; Abi Saravanan; Papri Ghosh; Sunu Lakshmi; Gayatri Rema; Ashwin Kumar
- Cinematography: Arun Prasath
- Edited by: A. Sreekar Prasad; MR Rejeesh
- Music by: Ilaiyaraaja
- Production company: Staar Makers
- Release date: 30 January 2015
- Country: India
- Language: Tamil

Touring Talkies is a 2015 Tamil anthology film written and directed by S. A. Chandrasekaran. The film consists of two stories and stars S. A. Chandrasekaran himself, Papri Ghosh, Sunu Lakshmi, Gayatri Rema, and Ashwin Kumar. The music score is composed by Ilaiyaraaja. The audio launch happened on 26 January 2015. The film was released on 30 January 2015.

== Synopsis ==
Two parallel stories - one with an old man looking for his long lost love and the other about an elder sister seeking revenge against those responsible for the death of her sibling.

== Cast ==
=== Love @ 75 ===
- S. A. Chandrasekhar as Anthony
- Abi Saravanan as young Anthony
- Papri Ghosh as Hema
- Hema Malini
- Ankitha
- Manobala as Koteeswaran
- A. Venkatesh as Doctor
- Vinayath Krishna
- Vigneshwaran Vijayan
- S. A. Senthil Vel
- A. Sumesh
- Shanti
- Gajendran
- Radha

=== Selvi 5am Vaguppu ===
- Sunu Lakshmi as Poongodi
- Gayatri Rema
- Ashwin Kumar as Ashwin
- Robo Shankar as Chinnaiyya
- V. I. S. Jayapalan as President
- Sevvalai Rasu
- Sai Gopi
- Theni Prakash
- Madurai Inbaraj
- Theni Left Pandi
- Tameem
- Mohanbabu
- Trivedha
- Kovai Bhanu
- Seeniammal
- Baby Akshaya
- Baby Josika

=== Cameo appearances in promotional song ===
- Jiiva
- Ameer
- Soori
- Vivek
- Sathyan
- Vijay Antony
- Ilaiyaraaja

== Soundtrack ==
Soundtrack was composed by Ilaiyaraaja.

No.	Song	Singers	Lyrics
1	"Uyire Unnai"	Ilaiyaraaja	Na. Muthukumar
2	"Touring Talkies"	Vijay Antony, Vivek, Mukesh, Sathyan	Muthamizh
3	"Suttipenne"	Vibhavari Apte Joshi	Na. Muthukumar
4	"Chakkan Chakka"	Ramya NSK	Na. Muthukumar
5	"Aasaimugam"	Karthik	Bharathiyar
6	"Nenju Porukuthilayae"	Sharreth, Anitha Karthikeyan	Bharathiyar
7	"Kathirunthaen"	Sharreth	Ilaiyaraaja

== Release ==
Sify stated that "SAC’s new experiment is not an easy one to execute and he has made the film in an engaging manner. He needs a pat on his back just for that. The message underlying in the film is much needed for the society". Times of India noted that: "In the first film, Love @ 75, [..] SAC tries to go all emo with this old couple romance in which the premise is hardly novel. [..] The next film, Selvi 5am Vaguppu, deals with sensitive topics — child rape and caste issues."
