= Sunu Lakshmi =

Indian actress

- Born: Sunu Lakshmi; Ernakulam, India
- Other name: Zera
- Occupation: Actress

Sunu Lakshmi is an Indian actress who works in Tamil and Malayalam films.

== Career ==
She started her acting career in a Telefilm called Shakunam directed by Biju Chandran and Telecast in Dooradarshan in 2006. Her first after that she was in Sengathu Bhoomiyile directed by Rathinakumar. Then her next project Eppothum Vendran directed by Siva Shanmugan. Touring Talkies directed by S. A. Chandrasekhar. Malayalam movie Snehamulloral Kudeullapol directed by Riju Nair. She starred in Aramm. Her Malayalam album "Azhakotha Maina" with Asif Ali was so famous.

== Personal life ==
She attended a school run by Seventh-day Adventists. She completed her degree at Annamalai University.

== Filmography ==
- All films are in Tamil, unless otherwise noted.

Year	Film	Role	Notes
2009	Sirithal Rasipen	Divya	
2012	Sengathu Bhoomiyile	Jayakodi	
2014	Eppothum Vendran	Sofiya	
2014	Snehamulloral Koodeyullappol	Janaki	Malayalam film
2015	Touring Talkies	Poonkodi	Anthology film; segment Selvi 5am Vaguppu
2017	Aramm	Sumathi	Tamil Nadu State Film Award for Best Character Artiste (Female)
2018	Saavi		
2018	Dharavi	Shivani	
2019	50 Roova		
2023	Ithu Kathaiyalla Nijam		
