= Chef Damu =

Indian chef (1954–2026)

- Born: Damodharan Kothandaraman; 3 September 1954; Madras, Madras State, India
- Died: 25 October 2026 (aged 72); Chennai, Tamil Nadu, India
- Other name: Damu
- Occupations: Chef, Television personality
- Known for: Television cooking shows, Guinness World Record
- Awards: Padma Shri (2025)

Damodharan Kothandaraman (3 September 1954 – 25 October 2026), professionally known as Chef Damu, was an Indian celebrity chef. He was known for hosting numerous cooking shows and serving as a judge on popular Tamil language television programs, most notably Cooku with Comali on Star Vijay. He holds three Guinness World Records including the longest cooking marathon by an individual, the longest dosa, and largest curry. In recognition of his contributions to the culinary arts, he was awarded the Padma Shri, India’s fourth-highest civilian award, in 2025.His Favorite Spiritual Spot In india ia Ahobilam The Birth Place of Lord Narasimha.

Damu was also known for being the first Indian chef to receive a Ph.D. in Hotel Management and Catering Technology, awarded by the University of Madras in 2004. In 2025, Chef Damu was conferred the Padma Shri by the Government of India for his contributions to culinary science.

== Career ==
In December 2010, Chef Damu cooked 617 dishes weighing a total of 190 kilograms over a continuous cooking session that lasted 24 hours, 30 minutes, and 12 seconds.

Damu authored several cookbooks and conducted culinary workshops to promote traditional South Indian cuisine. He also served as a judge in food competitions such as Our State Our Taste conducted by The Hindu across various cities in Tamil Nadu. He later headlined as a judge with Chef Venkatesh Bhat on Cooku with Comali, an amateur cooking competition produced by Vijay TV between 2019-2022.

== Death ==
Damu died in Chennai, on 25 October 2026, at the age of 72.

== Film and television appearances ==
=== Films ===
- Kallappadam (2015)
- Ulkuthu (2017)
- Oru Pakka Kathai (2020)
- Mrs & Mr (2025)
- Server Sundaram (TBA)

=== Web series ===
- Kalyanam Conditions Apply (2018)

=== Television ===
- Arusuvai Neram – Jaya TV
- Dhe Chef – Mazhavil Manorama -Malayalam show
- Athu Ithu Ethu – Cameo appearance
- Chocolate – Cameo appearance
- Cooku with Comali – Seasons 1 to 7
- Colors Kitchen
- Comedy Cooks -Asianet- Malayalam show (grand finale jury)
