= Kalari (film) =

- Poster
- Directed by: Kiran Chand
- Written by: Kiran Chand
- Produced by: Senith Keloth
- Starring: Krishna; Vidya Pradeep; Samyuktha
- Cinematography: R. B. Gurudev
- Edited by: S. N. Fazil
- Music by: V. V. Prasanna
- Production company: Nakshatra Movie Magic
- Release date: 24 August 2018
- Running time: 150 minutes
- Country: India
- Language: Tamil

Kalari (transl. Warfield) is a 2018 Tamil-language action thriller film written and directed by Kiran Chand and produced by Senith Keloth under the Nakshathra Movie Magic banner. The film stars Krishna, Vidya Pradeep, and Samyuktha in the lead roles, while M. S. Bhaskar and Jayaprakash play pivotal roles. The soundtrack and background score were composed by V. Prasanna, while the cinematography and editing were done by R. B. Gurudev and Sathyaraj Natarajan respectively. The film was released on 24 August 2018.

== Cast ==
- Krishna as Murugesan
- Vidya Pradeep as Mallika
- Samyuktha as Thenmozhi
- M. S. Bhaskar as Maari
- Jayaprakash as Siddique Bhai
- Vishnu as Anwar
- Pandi as Murugesan's friend
- Sendrayan as Peter

== Production ==
Directed by debutant Kiran, the film is set in Vathuruthy in Kochi and tells the tale of a strained father-son relationship. Krishna was signed to portray a man with agoraphobia who wants to lead a peaceful life, while his abusive father, essayed by M. S. Bhaskar, was characterised as a rogue who lives life at his own will. Vidya Pradeep was selected to play Krishna's pair, while Samyuktha Menon was signed to debut as Krishna's sister. R. B. Gurudev handled the film's cinematography, while playback singer V. Prasanna turned music composer with this film. Kiran had filmed the project in Vathuruthy owing to its large Tamil population and its proximity to a railway track, which features throughout the film. In regard to the title, Krishna noted the film has nothing to do with kalaripayattu, the art form. He stated that "kalari" in Tamil means war, and the film dealt with the internal and external wars of his character in the film.

The shoot of the film began in January 2017 and continued throughout the year.

== Release ==
The Times of India gave the film two out of five stars and wrote that "Kalari is let down by the dated treatment. Neither the script nor the filmmaking feels fresh."

== Track listing ==
- Kedaya - Vaishali Samant, Prassanna
- Sokkali - Velmurugan, Mahalingam
- Yaaradhu - Hariharan, M. M. Monisha
