= Kabadam =

Indian thriller film by Jothimurugan

- Theatrical release poster
- Directed by: Jothimurugan
- Written by: M. K. Mani (dialogues)
- Screenplay by: Jothimurugan
- Story by: Jothimuguran
- Produced by: Chozha S. Ponnuragam
- Starring: Sachin; Angana Roy
- Cinematography: K. Thirunavukkarasu
- Edited by: K. Balasubramaniam
- Music by: Sazzy
- Production company: Chozha Creations
- Distributed by: Mountain Movie Makers
- Release date: 22 August 2014
- Country: India
- Language: Tamil

Kabadam (transl. Hypocrisy) is a 2014 Indian Tamil-language thriller film directed by Jothimurugan and starring Sachin and Angana Roy. The films is the third Tamil remake of Across the Hall (2009) after Unnodu Oru Naal (2013) and Ner Ethir (2014) and was released to negative reviews.

== Cast ==
- Sachin as Vichu
- Adithya as Shiva
- Angana Roy as Padmini
- Ranika as Kavitha
- Kadhal Saravanan as Kalyanam, hotel room boy
- Jagadish Dharmaraj as Padmini's father
- Hema as Padmini's mother
- Ashwin as Ashwin

== Production ==
Jothimurugan previously worked as an assistant director to Chimbudevan, Radha Mohan and Selvaraghavan. Sachin, who worked as a sound engineer to A. R. Rahman and acted in Yaathumagi (2010), returned to films after a hiatus. Angana Roy played a role with negative shades. The film was given an A certificate. The film was reportedly dubbed in Sinhalese in 2012.

== Soundtrack ==
The music was composed by Sazzy.

All lyrics are written by Na. Muthukumar.

Track listing
No.	Title	Singer(s)	Length
1.	"Aan Pen"	Sachin	4:30
2.	"Unnale Naan Maarinen"	Hariharan, Sachin	5:25
3.	"Hey Pulla"	Sunitha Sarathy, Sachin	4:45
4.	"Sandaali"	Sachin, Shan Sadesh	3:54
5.	"Edhai Thedi"	Mahesh Vinayagam	3:42
6.	"Padmini"	Sachin	2:02
Total length:			24:18

== Reception ==
Malini Mannath of The New Indian Express wrote that "Not surprisingly the cast end up with some very uninspiring performances. Kabadam is the worst of the three 'remakes'". A critic from Dinamalar concluded that the film was a counterfeit film. A critic from iFlicks wrote that "Director Jyothi Murugan has repeated a good old story and there is nothing new about the screenplay. The first half is a bit boring but the second half maintains a good pace".
