= Angana Roy =

Indian actress

- Occupation: Actress
- Years active: 2013-present

Angana Roy is an Indian actress, who has appeared in Tamil, Telugu and Malayalam films. recently, her upcoming film Dahini is slotted to release in Cannes Film Festival. She was seen in Srimanthudu and Kalaga Thalaivan, her upcoming releases are Arasi with Varalaxmi Sarathkumar and Dahini.

== Career ==
Angana is a south Indian film industry actress. Before venturing into films she pursued her academics in commerce and finance and holds a master's degree in the field. She was also a corporate HR in a fortune 500 firm. Alongside her education she is also trained in classical Hindustani music and a very strong sports enthusiast. Being tall, she created a model portfolio and endorsed several brands across India, walked the ramp for many shows and later was approached by director Manohar to feature in his Tamil film Ragalaipuram, a comedy which starred Karunas. Before the release of the film, she also began work on Kabadam and the AR Murugadoss production Vathikuchi. by June 2012 She has since signed on to appear in Telugu and Kannada language films.

2014 she played a role with dual shades in Kabadam and was seen as a nurse in Megha. Her first 2015 release was her maiden Malayalam film Picket 43 directed by Major Ravi. In her next Tamil film, Mahabalipuram she played a "newly married, office going girl".

She has acted in Telugu projects, one of which is a movie of Koratala Siva called Srimanthudu starring Mahesh Babu. which was a massive hit in Telugu after Baahubali. She had two more releases in Telugu in 2016, Sri Sri with Krishna as his daughter which is an official remake of a state awarded Marathi film and another untitled project. In 2016 she was also awarded with two awards namely 'Bharat Icon Awards' in Mumbai and as a 'Multi lingual actress' to have worked with all 4 languages in south Indian cinema.. In 2017 she received the Women Achievers State Award by the Karnataka Chief Minister "Siddaramaiah" and by the Mayor of Bangalore Miss "Padmavathi" for her long time contribution to the field of fashion and modelling and for her work in films and social welfare activities.

She was also the lead for a mega series in Colors Tamil television in prime time slot and another project with Star Vijay television which will be the first Fantasy series of Vijay TV.

== Filmography ==
Year	Title	Role	Language	Notes
2013	Vathikuchi		Tamil	
2013	Ragalaipuram	Kalyani	Tamil	
2014	Kabadam	Padmini	Tamil	
2014	Megha	Thulasi	Tamil	
2015	Picket 43	Hanara	Malayalam	
2015	Mahabalipuram	Sangeetha	Tamil	
2015	Srimanthudu	Harsha's cousin	Telugu	
2016	Manithan	Priya's sister	Tamil	
2016	Sri Sri	Swetha	Telugu	
2016	Chal Chal Gurram		Telugu	
2017	7 Naatkal	Jennifer	Tamil	
2017	Kadaisi Bench Karthi	Divya	Tamil	
2018	Who	Neena	Malayalam	
2022	Kalaga Thalaivan	Reba	Tamil	

=== TV Series ===
Year	Title	Role	Language	Channel
2018	Gramathil Oru Naal	Contestant	Tamil	Sun TV
2019	Thari	Nakshatra	Tamil	Colors Tamil
2019	Thazhampoo	Vasuki	Tamil	Star Vijay
