= Sreeja Chandran =

Indian television actress

- Born: Tiruvalla, Kerala, India
- Occupations: Actress; dancer
- Years active: 2001-Present
- Notable work: Saravannan Meenatchi; Mappillai (Vijay TV serial)
- Spouse: Senthil Kumar (m. 2014)
- Children: 1

YouTube information
- Channel: Senthil Sreeja Originals
- Years active: 2007– Present
- Subscribers: 320 thousand
- Views: 65.8 million
- Last updated: 5 August 2026

Sreeja Chandran is an Indian television actress who predominantly works in Malayalam and Tamil soap operas. She played the lead in STAR Vijay's serial Saravannan Meenatchi as Meenatchi.

== Personal life ==
She acted in Saravanan Meenatchi with RJ Senthil Kumar and married him on 2 July 2014. Their son was born on 4 January 2023 and their son name is Sree Vallabh Dev

== Television ==
Title	Role	Channel	Language	On Air/ Off Air	Notes
Pakalmazha		Surya TV	Malayalam	Off-Air	Television debut
Ammathamburatti		Asianet	Malayalam	Off-Air	
Gandharvayamam		Asianet	Malayalam	Off-Air	
Valayam	Sunanda	DD Malayalam	Malayalam	Off-Air	
Vikramadhithyan		Asianet	Malayalam	Off-Air	
Kaazhcha		DD Malayalam	Malayalam	Off-Air	
Dracula		Asianet	Malayalam	Off-Air	
Thulasidhalam	Sreeja	Surya TV	Malayalam	Off-Air	
Manassariyathe	Indhu	Surya TV	Malayalam	Off-Air	
Kadamattathu Kathanar	Subadhra's Daughter	Asianet	Malayalam	Off-Air	
Priyam	Asha	Kairali TV	Malayalam	Off-Air	
Sneham	Sekharan's daughter	Surya TV	Malayalam	Off-Air	
Swantham	Suchitra	Asianet	Malayalam	Off-Air	
Thalolam		Surya TV	Malayalam	Off-Air	
Kudumbini	Shyama	Asianet	Malayalam	Off-Air	
Panthalayaniyilekku Oru Yathra		Amrita TV	Malayalam	Off-Air	Telefilm
Akkare Ikkare		Asianet	Malayalam	Off-Air	
Penninte Katha		Asianet	Malayalam	Off-Air	
Krishankripasagaram	Goddess Lakshmi	Asianet	Malayalam	Off-Air	
Velankanni Mathavu	Raechal	Surya TV	Malayalam	Off-Air	
Nirmalyam	Maya	Asianet	Malayalam	Off-Air	
Swami Ayyappan	Goddess Lakshmi/Sita	Asianet	Malayalam	Off-Air	
Sreekrishnaleela	Goddess Lakshmi	Asianet	Malayalam	Off-Air	
Madhurai	Meenatchi	STAR Vijay	Tamil	Off-Air	Tamil Debut
Manikoondu	Preethi	Sun TV	Tamil	Off-Air	
Sreemahabhagavatham	Goddess Lakshmi	Asianet	Malayalam	Off-Air	
Pakalmazha		Amrita TV	Malayalam	Off-Air	
Kanamarayathu		Kairali TV	Malayalam	Off-Air	
Devimahathmyam	Goddess Lakshmi / Sukanya	Asianet	Malayalam	Off-Air	
Aadhiparashakthi	Devi	Surya TV	Malayalam	Off-Air	
Mattoruval		Surya TV	Malayalam	Off-Air	
Swamiya Saranamayyappa	Parvathy	Surya TV	Malayalam	Off-Air	
Meera	Meera	STAR Vijay	Tamil	Off-Air	
Mundhanai Mudichu	Tamilarasi	Sun TV	Tamil	Off-Air	
Sreekrishnan	Meera	Surya TV	Malayalam	Off-Air	Cameo in song
Nila	Meenatchi	Kalaignar	Tamil	Off-Air	
Saravanan Meenatchi Season 1	Meenatchi	STAR Vijay	Tamil	Off-Air	Mega Hit
Mapillai	Meenatchi	STAR Vijay	Tamil	Off-Air	Super Hit

== Web Series ==
Year	Title	Role	Streaming Platform	Ref
2017	Kalyanam Conditions Apply	Sreeja	YouTube	
2019	Hear 2 Heart	Sreeja	YouTube	
2020	Kalyanam Conditions Apply (Season 2)	Sreeja	YouTube	
2021	Kalyanam Conditions Apply (Season 3)	Sreeja	YouTube	

== Filmography ==
Year	Film	Character	Language	Notes
1995	Kathapurushan	Child artist	Malayalam	
2001	Pularvettam	Ratha	Malayalam	
2002	Krishna Gopalakrishna	Radha	Malayalam	
2002	Valkannadi	Aswathi	Malayalam	
2003	Sahodharan Sahadevan	Yamuna	Malayalam	
2006	Pakal	Merlin	Malayalam	
2006	Vadakkumnadhan	Lakshmi	Malayalam	
2006	Bhargavacharitham Moonam Khandam	Uncredited role	Malayalam	
2008	Andavan	Uncredited role	Malayalam	
	Sri Durgamba (album)	Goddess Durga	Malayalam	
2014	Vennila Veedu	Herself	Tamil	
