= Rombha Nallavan Da Nee =

2015 Indian film by A. Venkatesh

- Directed by: A. Venkatesh
- Produced by: Deepak Kumar R. Nair; Sarvajeeth
- Starring: Mirchi Senthil; Shruthy Bala; Sarvajeeth
- Cinematography: V. N. Manohar
- Edited by: Vijay Velkutty
- Music by: Ram Surender
- Production company: Rendezvous Movvie Makers
- Release date: 6 March 2015
- Country: India
- Language: Tamil

Rombha Nallavan Da Nee (transl. You are a very good man) is a 2015 Indian Tamil language comedy thriller film written and directed by A. Venkatesh. The film stars Mirchi Senthil and Shruty Bala, while Sarvajeeth plays a pivotal role. The film, produced by actors Sarvajeeth and Deepak Nair, was released on 6 March 2015.

== Plot ==
Bhaskar, who was intoxicated, decides to end his life and confides in a stranger about his troubles. Unbeknownst to him, the stranger is a serial killer who begins to eliminate those who caused problems for Bhaskar.

== Cast ==
- Mirchi Senthil as Bhaskar
- Shruty Bala
- Sarvajeeth
- A. Venkatesh
- Rekha
- Robo Shankar as Bhaskar's friend
- Imman Annachi as police inspector
- Vennira Aadai Moorthy
- Swaminathan
- John Vijay
- Kanal Kannan
- Sona Heiden
- Deepak Nair
- Scissor Manohar
- Aadhavan in a cameo appearance
- Gaana Bala in a cameo appearance

== Production ==
The film is produced by Sarvajeeth and Deepak Nair, who also appear in pivotal roles in the film. Director Venkatesh revealed he cast actor Mirchi Senthil in the lead role as he reminded him of actor K. Bhagyaraj, "who had a naïve face, yet everything he did was clever". The film began production in January 2014 and Venkatesh worked on the film alongside his commitments in Sandamarutham.

== Soundtrack ==
The soundtrack is composed by newcomer Ram Surender.

- "Friend Nambuda" - Gaana Bala
- "God God" - Gaana Bala
- "Rajini Enakku" - Franco, Delsy Ninan
- "Romba Nallavan" - Deepesh Krishnamurthy
- "Ulagame Thozha" - Jeetu Ramachandra

== Reception ==
Malini Mannath of The New Indian Express wrote that "With a lot of fun moments in the first half, the narration takes a suspense-thriller mode in the second. It’s a well-crafted finale wrapped up with a smart ending".
