= Thari (TV series) =

- Also known as: Annalakshmi
- Genre: Family; Drama
- Directed by: S.N Shaktivel; Hafees
- Starring: Sreenithi; Mu Ramaswamy; Angana Roy; M. Farina Azad
- Country of origin: India
- Original language: Tamil
- No. of seasons: 1
- No. of episodes: 176

Production
- Editors: Sathish; Balaji
- Running time: 21–22 minutes

Original release
- Network: Colors Tamil
- Release: 1 April – 16 November 2019

Thari (transl.Loom) was a 2019 Tamil-language family drama starring Sreenithi, Angana Roy, Mu Ramaswamy and M. Farina Azad. The show replaces Ilayathalapathy and airs on Colors Tamil from 1 April 2019 to 16 November 2019.

== Synopsis ==
The story is about a girl, Annalakshmi (Sree Nithi), who belongs to the weaving community and how she overcomes problems around her.

== Cast ==
=== Main cast ===
- Sreenithi as Annalakshmi a.k.a. Annam − Kathiresan's younger daughter
- Angana Roy → Shaliy Avinesh as Nakshatra − Dhruv's elder sister
- Sabari Prasanth as Dhruv − Nakshatra's younger brother

=== Recurring cast ===
- Mu Ramaswamy as Kathiresan − Annalakshmi's father
- Jintha Ravi Shankar as Naayagam − Annalakshmi's uncle
- Mithun as Vettukili
- Suresh Chakravarthy as Kalaivaanan − Nakshatra's father
- Harsha Nair
