= Mundhanai Mudichu (TV series) =

Indian TV series

- Genre: Soap opera Drama
- Created by: Madhu Mohan; C.U Muthu Selvan
- Based on: Kumkum Bhagya
- Written by: Salem Siva M.P. Dialogues Ve. Ki. Amirtharaj
- Screenplay by: Ve.Ki.Amirtharaj; Siva.I.la.Amalraj
- Directed by: Salem.Siva.MP. (001-167); P.Selvam (168-1325)
- Creative directors: Siddhiq & Madhu Mohan
- Starring: Delhi Kumar; Durga; Rani; Sreeja Chandran; Kuyili; Manohar.K
- Country of origin: India
- Original language: Tamil
- No. of seasons: 22
- No. of episodes: 1,325

Production
- Producer: Siddhiq
- Cinematography: Ashok Devaraj; B. Thiyagarajan
- Editors: S.N.Balaji; V.Karthik
- Camera setup: Multi-camera
- Running time: approx. 20-22 minutes per episode
- Production company: Cine Times Entertainment

Original release
- Network: Sun TV
- Release: 26 April 2010 – 4 April 2015

Mundhanai Mudichu is a 2010 Indian Tamil-language soap opera that aired on Sun TV. The show premiered from 26 April 2010 to 4 April 2015, for 1,325 episodes. It aired Monday through Saturday at 6:00PM IST. The show starred Delhi Kumar, Shree Durga, Manoharan Krishnan, Rani and Hemalatha.

The show was produced by Cine Times Entertainment and directed by Salem Siva MP, P. Selvam, Sundar K. Vijayan, Saadhasivam Perumal and Creative Head by Siddhiq.

The "Mundhanai Mudichu" theme song was written by lyricist Vairamuthu and composed by Kumar and Pandiyan. Other music for the serial is provided by G. V. Kalaikathir. It also airs in Sri Lanka on the Tamil channel Vasantham TV.

== Plot ==
The Story is about Kandaswamy and his family. Prema wants to destroy Kandaswamy and his family because she thinks that her father was killed by Kandaswamy. So, she makes lot of evil plans and gives troubles to Kandaswamy's family but Kavitha, eldest daughter-in-law of the family, stands against her and saves the family from Prema.

== Cast ==
=== Main ===
- Delhi Kumar as Kanthasamy (Episode 1-1325)
- Manohar as Muthukumar (1-1325)
- Srividhya (1-404) → Sridurga (405-1325) as Kavitha Muthukumar
- Vineetha Shalini (1-1099) → Soniya as Meena Madhavan (Madhavan's 1st wife) (1100-1325)
- Maanas Chavali as Madhavan (558-1325)
- Ramya Shankar (1-50) → Krithika Annamalai (51-575) → Pooja Lokesh (575-989) → Rani (989-1325) as Premavalli (alias) Prema Palaniyappan

=== Recurring ===
- Sreeja Chandran as Tamizharasi
- Prakash Rajan as Saravanan
- Srisha as Vasanthi Saravanan
- Kurunjinathan as Karthik
- Durgasri as Swathi Karthik
- Pooja → Jothi as Thenmozhi
- Thilla Subramaniyan as Palaniyappan (Kanthasamy Brother, Prema's husband)
- Vijayalakshmi as Nandhini (Palaniyappan's First Wife, Ex Lover wrong relationship Fairing Susait death)
- Vetrivel as Ranjithraj
- Haripriya as Anitha Ranjithraj
- Sridhar as Rathnam Madhavan's father
- Geetha Saraswathi as Uma Madhavan's mother
- Srividya Natrajan as Avanthika Madhavan (Madhavan's 2nd Wife)
- Bhavani → Rekha Suresh as Avanthika's mother
- Madhu Mohan as Avanthika's father
- Raghuvaran as Karuppu
- Sri Vidhya Shankar as Tamizharasi's biological mother
- Sivan Srinivasan as Tamilzharasi's biological father
- Sruthi as Priya (Tamizharasi's friend, died in serial, killed by Ashok)
- Vijayalakshmi → J. Lalitha as Ashok's mother
- Vijay Anand (1-500) → Sharvan Rajesh (500-715) → Nesan Nepolean (716-1325) as Ashok (Priya's affair, jailed)
- Kovai Krishnan as Thangarasu (Ashok's father, died in serial)
- Sangeetha as Sailatha
- S. N. Parvathi as Meenakshi, Sadhasivam's mother
- Kuyili as Meenakshi (Kavitha's, Vasanthi's and Swathi's mother, died in the serial, killed by Prema)
- Raviprakash → Mohan Sharma as Annamalai (Kavitha's, Vasanthi's and Swathi's father, Died in the serial, killed by Sadhasivam)
- Sulakshana as Krishnaveni (Kanthasamy Wife, Died in the serial, killed by Premavalli)
- S. N. Lakshmi → Vatsala Rajagopal as Kanthasamy and Palaniyappan's Mother (Died in the serial, killed by Prema)
- Pollachi Babu as Sadhasivam (jailed)
- Bhuvana → Revathi Sankar as Prema's mother (died in the serial)
- Rajkumar Manoharan as Meena's ex-lover (dead in serial, killed by Madhavan)

== Adaption ==
Language	Name	First aired	Channel	Last Aired	Episode
Hindi	Kumkum Bhagya	14 April 2014	Zee TV	21 September 2025	3208
Hindi	Kundali Bhagya	12 July 2017	Zee TV	6 December 2024	2048
Hindi	Bhagya Lakshmi	3 August 2021	Zee TV	29 June 2025	1356

== See also ==
- List of programs broadcast by Sun TV
