= Yaakkai =

2017 Indian film by Kuzhandhai Velappan

- Theatrical release poster
- Directed by: Kuzhandai Velappan
- Written by: Kuzhandai Velappan
- Produced by: Muthukumaran
- Starring: Krishna; Swathi Reddy; Prakash Raj
- Cinematography: Sathya Ponmar
- Edited by: V. J. Sabu Joseph
- Music by: Yuvan Shankar Raja
- Production company: Prim Pictures
- Release date: 3 March 2017
- Running time: 127 minutes
- Country: India
- Language: Tamil

Yaakkai (transl. Body) is a 2017 Indian Tamil romantic crime thriller film directed by Kuzhandhai Velappan, starring Krishna and Swathi Reddy in the leading roles. Featuring music composed by Yuvan Shankar Raja, the film was released on 3 March 2017.

== Cast ==
- Krishna as Kathir
- Swathi Reddy as Kavitha
- Prakash Raj as Sagayam
- Radha Ravi as Krishnamurthy
- Guru Somasundaram as Sriram
- M. S. Bhaskar as Kathir's father
- G. Marimuthu as Kavitha's father
- Singampuli as Muniyappan (Police)
- Mayilsamy as Bar Patron
- Melvin M. Ranjan as Melvin
- Hari Krishnan as Noor
- Aathma Patrick

== Production ==
In November 2013, Kuzhandhai Velappan, who debuted with Aanmai Thavarael (2011), and Krishna announced that they would make a film titled Idhayam, and that the latter had purchased the title rights from the makers of the 1991 film of the same name. The film underwent a title change from Idhayam to Yaakkai in November 2014, after the team had shot for six days and had cast Prakash Raj as a police officer and Swathi Reddy as the heroine. The film was later put on hold until the completion of the lead pair's other ongoing project, Yatchan (2015).

The film then progressed throughout 2016, with Guru Somasundaram joining the cast to portray an antagonist in the film. Shoots were predominantly held in college campuses across Chennai, while scenes were also shot in Coimbatore, Ooty and Kothagiri. The film entered its post-production stages in July 2016, with Krishna dubbing for his portions in a single day.

== Soundtrack ==
Two songs from the film were released as promotional singles, prior to the release of the film's album. "Nee" sung by Yuvan Shankar Raja was released to coincide with Valentine's Day in 2016, while another song titled "Solli Tholaiyen Ma" sung by Dhanush was released during July 2016.

Track-List
No.	Title	Lyrics	Singer(s)	Length
1.	"Neee"	Na. Muthukumar	Yuvan Shankar Raja	3:25
2.	"Solli Tholaiyen Maa"	Vignesh Shivan	Dhanush	3:23
3.	"Naan Ini Kaatril"	Pa. Vijay	Yuvan Shankar Raja, Chinmayi	3:45
4.	"Ennullae"	Pa. Vijay	Tanvi Shah	3:33
Total length:				14:06

== Critical reception ==
Sify wrote "Throughout the film, the director takes the audiences for granted with amateurish writing and execution. Except for the visuals and Yuvan’s score nothing really works. To conclude, this is nothing but clumsy writing and execution." New Indian Express wrote "Of about 127 minutes of viewing time, 'Yaakkai' is a monotonous journey, unexciting and uninteresting." Baradwaj Rangan of Film Companion wrote "It comes and goes, and the only interesting aspect of the film, it turns out, is a trick built around the timeline of the narrative. But like everything else, it’s not pulled off well."
