= Mappillai (Tamil TV series) =

- Official logo
- Also known as: Son in-law
- Genre: Soap opera
- Directed by: Francis Kathiravan
- Starring: Senthil Kumar; Sreeja Chandran
- Theme music composer: Ilayavan
- Country of origin: India
- Original language: Tamil
- No. of seasons: 2
- No. of episodes: 241

Production
- Producers: R. Atharsha; R. Bharathy Pirabhakaran; Jagan Manju
- Cinematography: M. Antony
- Editor: PM ACHUTHAN
- Camera setup: Multi-camera
- Running time: 22 minutes
- Production company: Fiction Team

Original release
- Network: Star Vijay
- Release: 14 November 2016 – 6 October 2017

Mappillai is a 2016 Indian Tamil language soap opera starring Senthil Kumar and Sreeja Chandran. STAR Vijay initially broadcast the series on weeknights at 9:00PM (IST), with the debut episode screened on 14 November 2016. On 26 June 2017, the broadcast time of the show was changed to 8:00PM (IST).

The show reunited actor-actress couple Senthil Kumar and Sreeja Chandran, who previously starred together in television soap operas Madhurai, and the first season of Saravanan Meenatchi. The show ended from 6 October 2017 with 241 Episodes.

== Plot ==
It is a story about Senthil (Senthil Kumar), who is forced to live in his mother-in law's house, which isn't a dignity according to Tamil people. Further, the show deals with the difficulties he goes through in Jaya's (Sreeja Chandran) house because of her parents and how a husband supports his wife in achieving success in her life.

== Cast ==
=== Main ===
- Senthil Kumar as Senthil Kumar "Senthil"
- Sreeja Chandran as Jaya Chandran "Jaya" (Maya)
- Pandi Kamal as Kamal
- Janani Ashok Kumar as Janani Kamal
- Rajashekar as Chandran, Jaya, Ramya, Janani, Sakthi & Divya's father
- Nikitha Murali as Sivani

=== Recurring ===
- Azhgappan as Azhagappan
- Anbazhgan as Anbazhagan "Anbu"
- Priya Prince as Priya
- Ramya Ramakrishna as Ramya Chandran
- Teenu as Sakthi Tamizh: Krish's 1st lover and Tamizh's wife
- Vaishali Taniga as Divya Chandran
- Sabitha Anand as Sharadha: Senthil, Kamal & Shalu's mother
- Shamily Sukumar as Shalu, Senthil's sister & Krish's wife
- RJ Navalakshmi as police inspector Selvi
- Viji Kannan as Parvathi Jaya, Ramya, Janani, Sakthi & Divya's mother
- Devipriya as Devi
- Maanas Chavali as Krishna "Krish"
- Amit Bhargav as Deepak
- Stalin Muthu as Tamizh
- Yamini as Maggi aka Madhumitha
- Kumaran Thangarajan as Jeeva

== Awards and nominations ==
In 2017, at its Vijay Television Awards, the channel gave its Nominated nine Category awards and This series was won Four awards.

Year	Award	Category	Recipient	Role	Result
2017	Vijay Television Awards	Favourite Screen Pair	Senthil & Sreeja	Senthil Kumar & Jaya	Won
2017	Vijay Television Awards	Best Mamiyar	Sabitha Anand	Sharadha	Won
2017	Vijay Television Awards	Favourite Comedian Fiction	Anbazhagan	Anbu	Won
2017	Vijay Television Awards	Best Cinematographer	M. Antony	Himself	Won
2017	Vijay Television Awards	Favourite Actor	Senthil Kumar	Senthil Kumar	Nominated
2017	Vijay Television Awards	Favourite Actress	Sreeja Chandran	Jaya	Nominated
2017	Vijay Television Awards	Best Mother	Sabitha Anand	Sharadha	Nominated
2017	Vijay Television Awards	Best Negative role	Viji Kannan	Parvathi	Nominated
2017	Vijay Television Awards	Best Family	Mappillai		Nominated
