= Alibhabha =

- Theatrical release poster
- Directed by: Neelan K. Sekar
- Written by: Neelan K. Sekar
- Produced by: Pattiyal Sekar
- Starring: Krishna; Janani; Prakash Raj
- Cinematography: Dinesh Kumar
- Edited by: V. T. Vijayan
- Music by: Vidyasagar
- Production company: Talking Times Pvt.Ltd
- Release date: 5 September 2008
- Running time: 106 minutes
- Country: India
- Language: Tamil

Alibhabha is a 2008 Indian Tamil-language thriller film directed by Neelan K. Sekar and produced by Pattiyal Sekhar. The film stars the latter's son Krishna along with Janani and Prakash Raj in the lead roles, while Biju Menon, Thilakan, and Azhagam Perumal play supporting roles. Vidyasagar scored the music for the film while V. T. Vijayan handled the editing and Dinesh Kumar worked the cinematography. The film was released on 5 September 2008.

== Plot ==
The city is being shaken by many heart-stopping crimes occurring at different places. Young women are being molested and killed with alarming frequency. Velu (Kreshna) helps his father Subramaniam (Prakash Raj) in stealing. Being seasoned thieves, they rob everything from pins to cars. A spate of young women is murdered, and these developments rock the city. Thiagarajan (Azhagam Perumal), a tough cop, investigates the case. However, differences of opinion crop up between the Police Commissioner (Biju Menon) and Thiagarajan. One day, Velu saves the commissioner from a meeting to steal the commissioner's car's audio player and gets acquainted with him. He then begins to fall for Janani (Janani), who works in a bank. One day, when Velu withdraws money, he is shocked to find the balance as Rs. 5 Lakhs. It suddenly swells to Rs. 30 Lakhs, then Rs. 70 Lakhs. That is when Subramaniam realizes that this is no mere coincidence. Someone was using them as a pawn to cover up for other serious activities. They were being used as the "third man", a common term in criminal parlance. Before they realize, all of them are caught in the web laid out. Who laid it out, how, and why, and do they eventually come out of it form the crux of the story. Subramaniam comes to Velu's rescue and manages to find the reason behind it. When the family begins to find out the reason behind this act, it results in bloodshed and gore, eventually ending with Velu coming across the killers of young women in the city.

== Cast ==
- Krishna as Velu
- Janani as Janani
- Prakash Raj as Subramaniam, Velu's father
- Thilakan as Narayanan
- Biju Menon as Police Commissioner, Narayanan's son-in-law
- Manobala as Loan Officer
- Azhagam Perumal as Thiagarajan, Asst. Police Commissioner
- Lollu Sabha Jeeva as Velu's friend
- Radha Ravi as Santhanapandian, Minister of Labour Department and Narayanan's friend

== Soundtrack ==
Alibhabha

Soundtrack album by Vidyasagar
- Released: 22 August 2008
- Recorded: Varsha Vallaki Studios
- Genre: Feature film Soundtrack
- Length: 19:34
- Language: Tamil
- Producer: Vidyasagar

Vidyasagar chronology
Jeyam Kondaan (2008)	Alibhabha (2008)	Raman Thediya Seethai (2008)

The music and background score is composed by Vidyasagar, with lyrics written by P. Vijay, Yugabharathi and Jayantha.

- "Krishna Krishna" - Ranjith
- "Are Sambo Sambo" - Jassie Gift
- "Neenda Mounam" - Karthik, Rajeswari
- "Nenjil Aathadi" - Vidyasagar, Shiva
- "Pudhiya Paarvai Ondru" - Ranjith, Sujatha Mohan

== Critical reception ==
A critic from Sify wrote, "On the whole Neelan definitely has the stuff in him, for a first timer his screenplay and narration is impressive, but towards the end goes overboard". Pavithra Srinivasan of Rediff.com rated the film three out of five stars and wrote, "With its allusions to the legend of Alibhabha, this latest flick has all the ingredients of a standard masala flick but it's got something more; a darn good story and intelligent screenplay that'll make you stick to your seats. Definitely worth a watch".
