= Vizhithiru =

2017 Indian film by Meera Kathiravan

- Theatrical release poster
- Directed by: Meera Kathiravan
- Written by: Meera Kathiravan
- Produced by: Meera Kathiravan
- Starring: Krishna; Vidharth; Venkat Prabhu; Dhansika; Rahul Bhaskaran
- Cinematography: Vijay Milton; R.V.Saran
- Edited by: Praveen K. L. N. B. Srikanth
- Music by: Sathyan Mahalingam
- Release date: 3 November 2017
- Country: India
- Language: Tamil

Vizhithiru (transl. Stay awake) is a 2017 Indian Tamil-language action thriller film written and directed by Meera Kathiravan, who debuted with Aval Peyar Thamizharasi. The film which began production in 2012 after numerous delays released in 2017. The film features an ensemble cast of Krishna, Vidharth, Dhansika, Venkat Prabhu, Rahul Bhaskaran, S. P. B. Charan, Thambi Ramaiah, Erica Fernandes, Sara Arjun, Nagendra Babu, and Abhinaya.

== Cast ==
- Kreshna as Muthukumar
- Vidharth as Chandra Babu
- Sai Dhanshika as Saroja Devi
- Venkat Prabhu as Dhileepan
- Rahul Bhaskaran as Vikram Viswanath
- S. P. B. Charan as Saravanan, news reporter
- Thambi Ramaiah as Karnan Sethupathi
- Erica Fernandes as Krishteena
- Sara Arjun as Charu
- Nagendra Babu as Nagendra Babu, Police Commissioner
- Abhinaya as Abhinaya, Radio City RJ
- Sudha Chandran as Vijayalakshmi
- R. N. R. Manohar as Ramamoorthy
- Ramachandran Durairaj
- V. I. S. Jayapalan
- Theepetti Ganesan
- Veera Santhanam
- Arun Mozhi Manikkam in a guest appearance
- T. Rajendar in a special appearance
- Sudhar in an uncredited role

== Production ==
Playback singer Sathyan Mahalingam made his debut as a music composer, and Vijay Milton will handled the cinematography, Praveen K. L. and N. B. Srikanth were hired as editors. The film, set in Chennai, happens within 12 hours. It was shot completely around Ritchie Street, Mount Road and Vepery.

== Soundtrack ==
The music was composed by Sathyan Mahalingam.

- Papparappa - T. Rajender, Priyadarshini
- Aazhi Alai (female) - Vaikom Vijayalakshmi
- Aazhi Alai (male) - Alphons Joseph
- Kolai Vaal - Vijay, Sricharan
- Vellai Irave - G. V. Prakash, Ramya NSK
- Pon Vidhi - Santhosh Narayanan

== Critical reception ==
The Times of India wrote, "A not-so-bad message towards the end and the writing in some sequences make the film a tolerable watch". Sify wrote, "Vizhithiru's core story has the potential of a classic thriller, the characters too are interestingly written but what works against the movie is the flat execution". The film was also reviewed by Hindu Tamil Thisai.
