= Kalyanam Conditions Apply =

- Genre: Web series Romance; Drama
- Written by: C. Jerrold
- Directed by: C. Jerrold
- Starring: Senthil Kumar; Sreeja Chandran
- Theme music composer: Shamanth
- Country of origin: India
- Original language: Tamil
- No. of episodes: 6

Production
- Editor: Muthu Krishnan
- Camera setup: Multi-camera
- Running time: approx. 15–16 minutes per episode
- Production companies: A. Mirchi Play Original; A. TRM Sri Barati Associate

Original release
- Network: Naver TV Cast
- Release: 30 November 2017 – 5 January 2018

Kalyanam Conditions Apply (transl. Marriage conditions apply) is a 2017 Indian Tamil-language romantic comedy web series starring Senthil Kumar, Sreeja Chandran and produced by A. Mirchi Play Original and A. TRM Sri Barati Associate. It premiered online through Naver TV Cast and YouTube every Thursday starting from 30 November 2017 and 5 January 2018 on Radio Mirchi Tamil YouTube Channel. Season 2 premiered on 22 July 2019.Mirchi Originals launches the third season of ‘Kalyanam: Conditions Apply’ web series on 19 March 2021.

== Main cast ==
- Senthil Kumar as Senthil
- Sreeja Chandran as Sreeja

== Episodes ==
=== Season 1 ===
Episodes	Story	Special approach	Telecast date
01	What's Cooking	Chef Damodharan; Latha Sathyamoorthy; R. Radha Manokar	30 November 2017
02	Mission Prabhas	Navin Victor; Vikash; Reshma; Jacintha; Master Akil	7 December 2017
03	Senthil v/s Cat-appa		15 December 2017
04	Sorry, No Saree		22 December 2017
05	Driving Me Crazy		29 December 2017
06	Phone Lock, Secret Talk	Kamal; Deepa; Banumathy; Stephy; Team Radio Mirchi	5 January 2018

=== Season 2 ===
- Episode 1: First Honeymoon, Second Chance (22 July 2019)
- Episode 2: Win - Win Situation (22 July 2019)
- Episode 3: Road Rage, Any Age (22 July 2019)
- Episode 4: Online Shopping, When Stopping? (22 July 2019)
- Episode 5: Big Boss from Bombay (22 July 2019)
- Episode 6: Smart Phone, Peace Gone(22 July 2019)

=== Season 3 ===
- Episode 1: Maid For Each Other( 15 March 2021)
- Episode 2: Online Class Full Mass (17 March 2021)
- Episode 3: Chennai Super Uncles(19 March 2021)
- Episode 4: Yaaradi Nee Mohini (21 March 2021)
- Episode 5: Guest of Horror (25 March 2021)
- Episode 6: Sreeja Vin Ulaga Nayagan (27 March 2021)
