= Kan Pesum Vaarthaigal =

2013 Indian film by R. Balaji

- Theatrical release poster
- Directed by: R. Balaji
- Written by: R. Saravanakumar
- Produced by: R. Saravanakumar
- Starring: Mirchi Senthil; Iniya
- Cinematography: Nagakrishnan
- Music by: Shamanth
- Production company: Sri Balaji Cine Creations
- Release date: 22 March 2013
- Country: India
- Language: Tamil

Kan Pesum Vaarthaigal (transl. The words spoken by the eyes) is a 2013 Tamil-language drama film directed by R. Balaji. Produced and written by R. Saravanakumar, the film stars Mirchi Senthil (in his lead debut) and Iniya, while Livingston, Aadukalam Murugadoss, Jangiri Madhumitha, and Rajendran play supporting roles. The music was composed by Shamanth. The film was released on 22 March 2013 and centers upon a young man who rethinks his life after his father attempts suicide. The film was filmed in Chennai and Singapore, with most of the filming taking place in Singapore. The film's title is based on a song from 7/G Rainbow Colony.

== Plot ==
Mahesh is an unemployed man living in Thiruvarur who enjoys hanging out with his friends. His father is unhappy with his son's irresponsible lifestyle and attempts suicide. Mahesh then begins to search for a job, and with the help of his friend Appukutty, finds a job in Singapore. He meets Janani, who is a Singapore citizen, and attempts to marry her in order to obtain citizenship. However, the truth is that Janani is not a Singapore citizen.

== Cast ==
- Mirchi Senthil as Mahesh
- Iniya as Janani
- Livingston as Mahesh's father
- Aadukalam Murugadoss as Appukutty
- Jangiri Madhumitha as Nimmi
- Rajendran as Janani's uncle

== Soundtrack ==
The music was composed by Shamanth.

- "Madhivadhani" - Vijay Prakash
- "Peyar Illa Mozhiyilae" - Vijay Yesudas, Harini
- "Aaram Arivilae" - Haricharan, Ramya NSK
- "Kopaiyil" - Velmurugan, Jassie Gift, Jude Chris, Yeshwanth
- "Kanpesum Varthai" - Shamanth
- "Peyar Illa Mozhiyilae" - Shravya, Yeshwanth

== Reception ==
IBN Live wrote that the film was "a good attempt, but following just four characters is a bit tiring at times." The Hindu issued feedback on how the subject is perfect from the talent adoption history of Singapore from R. Saravana Kumar, who reacted to the review of Udhav Naig from The Hindu said that it was a "classic example of how easily things can go wrong in a film, when two producers, who have largely ignored the need to research their subject matter, come together. The review came within hours of the movie was released. However there is no proof for Udhav Naig's irresponsible statement that the writer has largely ignored the research . In fact, the Singapore talent adoption history (favouring the writer) shows that they are continuously on the lookout for talent from overseas. Thus the review conflicts from the fact." Malini Mannath from The New Indian Express said "The film has a lyrical title and some appealing visuals of Singapore. But not sufficient to make the celluloid trip worthwhile!".
