= Pawan Krishna =

Indian actor

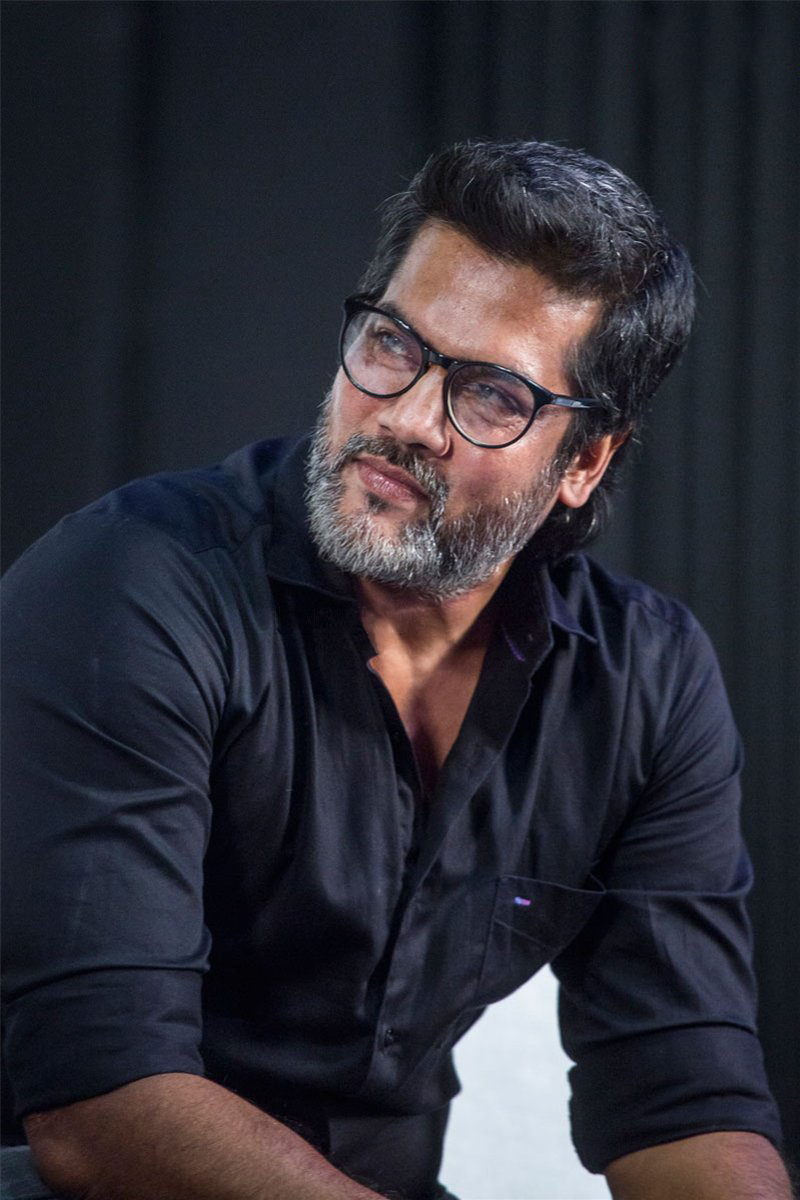
- Occupation: Actor
- Years active: 1997–present

Pawan Krishna is an Indian actor who has appeared in Tamil, Malayalam and Telugu films. He made his debut in Raasi, supporting role in Thimiru, before playing a leading role in Sengathu Bhoomiyilae.

== Career ==
Pawan ventured into Tamil films with Vetrimaaran's Polladhavan. He also played the villain role in the Vijay-starrer Kuruvi (2008), with his work for the film preventing him from accepting offers for roles in Aegan and Silambattam.

Pawan next featured in Rathnakumar's family drama film Sengathu Bhoomiyilae (2012) as the film's lead character but the film met with a low key release and mixed reviews. He then appeared as one of the four lead actors in Thagaraaru (2013), winning critical acclaim for his performance. Pawan also appeared in a small role in the Ajith Kumar starrer Veeram (2014). He starred in Vetrimaaran's Vada Chennai (2018) and Asuran (2019). He has played as politician in the film Mask (2025).

== Filmography ==
=== Tamil films ===
List of Tamil-language film credits
Year	Title	Role	Notes
1997	Raasi	Kumar's friend	Uncredited role
1998	Ulavuthurai	dancer in song "Kandu Pudithaya"	uncredited role
2002	Bala	Jeyamani's henchman	Uncredited role
2003	Alaudin	Gangadhar's henchman	Uncredited role
2005	Englishkaran	Padma's son	
2005	Kasthuri Maan	Kasi	
2005	Ji	Chezhiyan	
2006	Thimiru	Bavani	
2006	Kalabha Kadhalan	Dhana	
2007	Polladhavan	Out	
2008	Kuruvi	Soori	
2008	Dindigul Sarathy		
2008	Bheemaa	Pawan IPS	
2009	Maasilamani	Inspector Boopathy	
2009	Suriyan Satta Kalloori	Thiruchelvan, Kalaichelvan	
2012	Sengathu Bhoomiyilae	Vallarasu	
2012	Mayanginen Thayanginen	Muthukumar's friend	
2013	Thagaraaru	Senthil	
2013	Ragalaipuram	Burma Kumar	
2014	Veeram	Nallasivam's son	
2014	Theriyama Unna Kadhalichitten	Prakash	
2014	Vilaasam	Shiva (Seesa)	
2015	Kaalakattam		
2016	Kathakali	Sambantham	
2017	Vaigai Express	Ajay	
2018	Maniyaar Kudumbam	Thanrasu	
2018	Azhagumagan		
2018	Vada Chennai	Velu	
2019	Sathru	Kathiresan's brother	
2019	Asuran	Venkatesan	
2020	Naadodigal 2	Soumya's uncle	
2022	Therkathi Veeran		
2024	Maya Puthagam		
2024	Pogumidam Vegu Thooramillai	Esakkimuthu	
2025	Mask	MLA Manivannan	
2026	99/66		
2026	Blast	Kirubakaran	

=== Telugu films ===
List of Telugu film credits
Year	Title	Role	Notes
2009	Kurradu	Satya's right hand	Remake of Polladhavan
2017	Yuddham Sharanam	Jogi	
2022	Acharya	Obulu	
2022	Crazy Fellow	Chinni's Brother	
2023	Meter	Kantham Byreddy	Credited as Dhanush Pawan
2024	Raajadhani Files	Andhra Pradesh CM	

=== Malayalam films ===
List of Malayalam film credits
Year	Title	Role	Notes
2007	July 4	Williams	
2007	Janmam		
2009	Robin Hood	Goonda	
2010	Black Stallion	Perumal	
2010	The Thriller	Udayabhanu	
2010	Chaverpada	Jaggu Bhai / Jehangir Mustafa / Varghese Antony / Yogeeshwaran / Parameshwaran	

=== Web series ===
List of web series credits
Year	Title	Role	Network	Ref.
2023	Sengalam	Rajamanickam	ZEE5	
