= R. B. Gurudev =

Indian cinematographer

- Born: Chennai, Tamil Nadu, India
- Occupation: Director of photography

R. B. Gurudev is an Indian cinematographer, who has worked in the Tamil film industry.

== Career ==
After apprenticing under Jeeva, Gurudev made his debut with Yogi (2009), though TN 07 AL 4777 (2009) released earlier. Gurudev's work has often won acclaim, the films he has worked on have often evaded commercial success. For his work in Chikku Bukku (2010), a critic from The Hindu noted that Gurudev "proves that he is from the late Jeeva's school, panning his camera in style he offers a brilliant visual treat". Likewise in Ameer's Aadhi Bhagavan, a critic wrote "whether it is the beaches of Pattaya, the deserts of Rajasthan, scenic Goa or Mumbai, cinematography by K. Devaraj and R. B. Gurudev is an absolute treat to the eye", and "each and every scene has been picturised tastefully". Similarly, his work in Megha (2014), was described as one of the film's few "bright spots".

Gurudev was involved in the making of the successful Kanchana 2 (2015) and completed eighty percent of the film's shoot. However a delay in the film meant that he was unable to continue shooting as he had committed to work on Irumbu Kuthirai (2014). Unwilling to wait, Raghava Lawrence decided to finish Kanchana 2 with another cinematographer, much to the annoyance of Gurudev.

== Filmography ==
Year	Film	Language	Notes
2007	Urchagam	Tamil	
2007	Rameswaram	Tamil	
2009	TN 07 AL 4777	Tamil	
2009	Yogi	Tamil	
2010	Chikku Bukku	Tamil	
2013	Ameerin Aadhi-Bhagavan	Tamil	
2013	Vathikuchi	Tamil	
2014	Megha	Tamil	
2014	Irumbu Kuthirai	Tamil	
2015	Kanchana 2	Tamil	
2015	144	Tamil	
2018	Mohini	Tamil	
2018	Kalari	Tamil	
2018	Genius	Tamil	
2019	Kennedy Club	Tamil	
2019	Gorilla	Tamil	
2022	Astakarmma	Tamil	
2022	Yutha Satham	Tamil	
2025	Vanangaan	Tamil	Replaced Balasubramaniem
