= Uttama Villain (soundtrack) =

2015 soundtrack album by Ghibran

Soundtrack album by Ghibran
- Released: 1 March 2015
- Recorded: 2013–2014
- Genre: Feature film soundtrack
- Length: 1:01:18
- Language: Tamil
- Label: Sony Music India
- Producer: Ghibran

Ghibran chronology
Jil (2015)	Uttama Villain (2015)	Papanasam (2015)
External audio
- Official Audio Jukebox (Tamil) on YouTube

Uttama Villain is the soundtrack album composed by Ghibran, for the 2015 Tamil film of the same name directed by Ramesh Aravind. The film stars Kamal Haasan in the leading role, who also wrote the script and co-produced the film under the banner Raaj Kamal Films International, alongside Thirrupathi Brothers and Eros International. The film marks Ghibran's first collaboration with Kamal Haasan for the first time. The soundtrack album featured seventeen tracks in total; having seven songs, karaoke versions for three of the tracks and seven instrumental compositions from the film score.

Both Kamal Haasan and Ghibran worked on the film's soundtrack during late 2013 and took a year-and-a-half on the film's soundtrack and score. The songs were recorded using instruments from Bali, Indonesia, and songs recorded using traditional instruments were mixed with orchestral symphony in the backgrounds and further fused with Villu Paatu and Theyyam, as both Ghibran and Kamal wanted to have creativity in music. Kamal Haasan penned five out of seven tracks, whilst Subbu Arumugam, a prominent Villu Paattu exponent sung and wrote one track, and Viveka penned one song. Haasan recorded vocals for five tracks, with the Sofia Symphony Orchestra performed three tracks in the background.

Uttama Villain's soundtrack was released on 1 March 2015 at a formal launch event held at the Chennai Trade Centre with the presence of the cast and crew and prominent celebrities from the industry. In an innovative approach, the soundtrack was unveiled through an online application instead of a conventional audio CD release. The album opened to widespread critical acclaim, and Ghibran received various accolades for his work in the film's soundtrack.

== Development ==
Yuvan Shankar Raja was signed on to compose the film's music during the film's announcement in June 2013 in his maiden collaboration with Kamal Haasan. But, he was later replaced by Ghibran in February 2014. During the film's production, Ghibran signed to compose Kamal's Vishwaroopam II, his second project with the actor, but as the film delayed, he has signed for the actor's other two projects: Papanasam and Thoongaa Vanam. Kamal bought musical instruments from Bali, Indonesia for recording a song in a mythical segment in the film because the instruments sounded both Indian and exotic and both Ghibran and Kamal Hassan wanted the music to be creative. According to Ghibran, traditional tunes were mixed with orchestral symphony backgrounds and were fused with Villu Paatu and Theyyam. Ghibran also said that he and Kamal Haasan decided to not use instruments traditionally used in period films such as tabla, ghatam and dholak. The composer further told that Kamal Hassan had sung in three songs and might sing in a few more.

In August 2014, Ghibran said that two of the songs would not be featured on the initial release of the album, citing that it would reveal the plot, and that the two songs would be reserved for the film. The Villu Paatu ("Uttaman Introduction") was written and performed by Subbu Arumugam, a prominent Villu Paattu exponent, along with Kamal Haasan. The base of "Iraniyan Naadagam", featured in the film's climax, was koothu "with a dash of atonality" and is built as an exchange between the characters of Hiranyakashipu and Prahlada. As the particular scene had already been shot with actors speaking the lines, Kamal Haasan and Rukmini Ashok Kumar later sang the same lines again on the track. The song "Kadhalaam Kadavul Mun" was based on the Maru Bihag raag. Ghibran had spent a year-and-a-half on the score. The film's score was featured in the web series Paurashpur, and Ghibran was upset with the creators of the series since they used the track without the consent of the composer. The sound track "Uttama Villain Theme" consist of two phrases repeating and sometimes overlapping. Mrithyun jaya jaya jaya and Akum baga baga baga. The phrase Mrithyun jaya jaya jaya means the triumph over death and Akum baga baga baga is a gibberish with has the same rhythm with the phrase Mrithyun jaya jaya jaya which would symbolise death. As the movie's plot revolves around immortality and death, the theme song symbolizes the cat and mouse chase between immortality and death.

== Release ==
The music rights were acquired by Sony Music India in late-July 2014. Initially, the team planned for an audio launch in September 2014. But due to post-production delays, the event was pushed to January 2015, where the team planned for a simultaneous audio release in Singapore and Malaysia. The venue was later shifted to United States, but it proved to be untrue. Soon, after few sources revealed that the audio launch of Uttama Villain will take place on 1 March, and it was confirmed by actor Kamal Haasan on 1 February 2015. An audio poster was released on mid-February 2015, confirming the film's audio launch date.

The launch for the film's soundtrack was held at Chennai Trade Centre on 1 March 2015. Besides the entire cast and crew, several prominent film personalities including Rajkiran, Rajkumar Sethupathi, Snehan, Santhana Bharathi, Vikram Prabhu, Keyaar, Dhananjayan, Vijay Shankar, K. S. Ravikumar, Moulee, S. A. Chandrasekar, A. M. Rathnam, Vijay Sethupathi, Sanchita Shetty, Rohini, Madhan Karky, Ponram, Rahman and Fivestar Kathiresan were present at the event, which was hosted by R. Parthiban. Attakalari dance artists from Bangalore, performed at the event. A live performance of the film's soundtrack was hosted by Ghibran and his musical team along with Kamal Haasan and Andrea Jeremiah, and dance performance by Parvati Nair. The audio launch event was telecasted through Jaya TV on 22 March 2015.

== Track listing ==
The official track list was released by Sony Music on 28 February 2015. It was revealed that the soundtrack album will be released with 17 tracks including seven themes from the score. As an innovative approach, the songs were released through mobile application instead of conventional audio CD, and the songs were made available on internet for digital download on the day of audio launch.

Track list
No.	Title	Lyrics	Singer(s)	Length
1.	"Loveaa Loveaa"	Viveka	Kamal Haasan, Sharanya Gopinath, Anitha Karthikeyan, Nivas	4:42
2.	"Kadhalaam Kadavul Mun"	Kamal Haasan	Padmalatha	4:04
3.	"Uttaman Introduction – Villuppattu"	Subhu Arumugam	Subhu Arumugam, Kamal Haasan	2:49
4.	"Saagaavaram"	Kamal Hassan	Kamal Haasan, Yazin Nizar, Ranjith, T. S. Ayyappan, Ghibran	2:48
5.	"Iraniyan Naadagam"	Kamal Hassan	Kamal Haasan, Rukmini Ashok Kumar, Sofia Symphony Orchestra	4:50
6.	"Mutharasan Kadhai"	Kamal Hassan	Kamal Haasan, Yazin Nizar, Ranjith, T. S. Ayyappan, Padmalatha, Sofia Symphony Orchestra	8:09
7.	"Uttaman Kadhai"	Kamal Hassan	M. S. Bhaskar, Yazin Nizar, Ranjith, T. S. Ayyappan, Sofia Symphony Orchestra	7:31
8.	"Uttama Villain Theme"	—	Kamal Haasan, Chorus	1:15
9.	"Guru & Sishya"	—	Instrumental	1:39
10.	"Father & Daughter"	—	Instrumental	2:20
11.	"Uthaman & Karpagavalli"	—	Instrumental	1:37
12.	"Father & Son"	—	Instrumental	2:31
13.	"Letter From & To Yamini"	—	Instrumental	2:38
14.	"Dr. Arpana"	—	Instrumental	1:25
15.	"Kadhalaam Kadavul Mun" (Karaoke)	—	Instrumental	4:04
16.	"Saagaavaram" (Karaoke)	—	Instrumental	2:47
17.	"Iraniyan Naadagam" (Karaoke)	—	Instrumental	4:40

== Critical response ==
The soundtrack received positive reviews. Siddharth K. of Sify rated it 4.5 out of 5 and wrote, "Ghibran has grown leaps and bounds with this album and has indeed delivered his career-best [...] If anyone has any problems in recognizing the effort that has gone into this album, they need to get their musical buds examined", further calling it as "an album to be cherished by film buffs and is not for the typical frontbenchers". M. Suganth of The Times of India wrote, "Uttama Villain is that rare Tamil film album which doesn't merely push the envelope but has managed to create a new, different envelope". Vipin Nair of Music Aloud gave it a score of 9 out of 10, calling it "one hell of a soundtrack". Behindwoods gave it 3.75 out of 5 and stated it as "a gem in Tamil cinema music". Karthik Srinivasan of Milliblog called it "one of the most daring and inventive musical attempts in recent Tamil cinema history". Indiaglitz rated 4 out of 5 saying it as "a remarkable soundtrack which will stand tall for years to come". Moviecrow gave 7 out of 10 for the soundtrack with a review "The songs are composed with a sense of purpose to aid the story that unfolds on the screen. If the objective of this album is to showcase musical virtuosity of Ghibran and Kamal, the album succeeds big time!" Baradwaj Rangan of The Hindu wrote in its review saying "Ghibran infused an element of fantasy in the sound in 67-minute long album, though it has more music in the film. It is one-of-a-kind in bringing innovations to the film's music, that can take you far and away from the cliched elements in Tamil cinema".

== Accolades ==
Award	Date of ceremony (Note: Date is linked to the article about the awards held that year, wherever possible.)	Category	Recipient(s) and nominee(s)	Result	Ref.
Behindwoods Gold Medal Awards	25 July 2016	Best Music Director	Ghibran	Won	
Behindwoods Gold Medal Awards	25 July 2016	Best Female Playback Singer – Tamil	Padmalatha for "Kadhalam Kadavul Mun"	Won	
South Indian International Movie Awards	30 June–1 July 2016	Best Music Director – Tamil	Ghibran	Nominated	
Los Angeles Independent Film Festival	14 November 2015	Best Original Music/Score	Ghibran	Won	
Los Angeles Independent Film Festival	14 November 2015	Best Original Song	Iraniyan Naadagam	Won	
Los Angeles Independent Film Festival	14 November 2015	Best Sound Design	Kunal Rajan	Won	
Russian International Film Festival	15 November 2015	Best Original Music	Ghibran	Won	
Moviecrow Best of Tamil Music	2015	Best Music Director	Ghibran	Won (5th place)	
Moviecrow Best of Tamil Music	2015	Best Album	Ghibran	Won (1st place)	
Moviecrow Best of Tamil Music	2015	Best Background Score	Ghibran	Won (1st place)	
Moviecrow Best of Tamil Music	2015	Best Lyrics	Kamal Haasan for "Saagavaram"	Won (1st place)	

== Charts ==
Chart(s) (2015)	Song title	Peak position	Reference
Radio Mirchi South	Loveaa Loveaa	1	
Radio Mirchi South	Kadhalam Kadavul Mun	5	
iTunes Music Charts	Loveaa Loveaa	2	
iTunes Music Charts	Kadhalam Kadavul Mun	7	
iTunes Music Charts	Saagaavaram	18	
Best of Tamil Music 2015 (India Today)	Saagaavaram	10	
Top 25 Songs 2015 (Music Aloud)	Kadhalam Kadavul Mun	1	
Top 25 Songs 2015 (Music Aloud)	Saagaavaram	7	
