= Jhansi (TV series) =

Indian action thriller television series

- Promotional poster - Season 2
- Genre: Action-thriller
- Written by: Ganesh Kaarthic
- Directed by: Thiru
- Starring: Anjali; Chandini Chowdary; Mumaith Khan; Aadarsh Balakrishna
- Music by: Sricharan Pakala
- Country of origin: India
- Original language: Telugu
- No. of seasons: 2
- No. of episodes: 10

Production
- Producers: Krishna; K. S. Madhubala
- Cinematography: Arvind Kumar
- Editor: Anthony
- Running time: 40 minutes
- Production company: Tribal Horse Entertainment

Original release
- Network: Disney+ Hotstar
- Release: 27 October 2022 – 19 January 2023

Jhansi is an Indian Telugu-language action thriller television series written by Ganesh Kaarthic and directed by Thiru. The series was produced by Krishna and K. S. Madhubala under the banner of Tribal Horse Entertainment. It stars Anjali in the titular role alongside Chandini Chowdary, Mumaith Khan, Aadarsh Balakrishna, Raj Arjun, Aberaam Varma, Kalyan Master, Sharanya R, and Samyukta Hornad.

The series premiered on Disney+ Hotstar on 27 October 2022. The second season of the series was released on 19 January 2023.

== Cast ==
- Anjali as Jhansi aka Mahitha
- Chandini Chowdary as Barbie
- Mumaith Khan
- Aadarsh Balakrishna as Sankeeth
- Raj Arjun as Caleb
- Aberaam Varma
- Kalyan Master
- Sharanya R
- Samyukta Hornad
- Talluri Rameswari as Amsa Begum
- Devi Prasad
- Chaitanya Sagiraju as Dhurva
- Nithu as Ameesha
- Adithya as Ethan
- Kamakshi Bhaskarla

== Episodes ==
Series	Episodes	Originally released
1	6	27 October 2022
2	4	19 January 2023

=== Season 1 (2022) ===
No.	Title	Directed by	Written by	Original release date
1	"Glitches"	Thiru	Ganesh Kaarthic	27 October 2022
2	"Man from the Past"	Thiru	Ganesh Kaarthic	27 October 2022
3	"The Dark Box"	Thiru	Ganesh Kaarthic	27 October 2022
4	"Another Murder"	Thiru	Ganesh Kaarthic	27 October 2022
5	"The Vigilante"	Thiru	Ganesh Kaarthic	27 October 2022
6	"Billu’s Club"	Thiru	Ganesh Kaarthic	27 October 2022

=== Season 2 (2023) ===
No.	Title	Directed by	Written by	Original release date
1	"Love and Betrayal"	Thiru	Ganesh Kaarthic	19 January 2023
2	"Italian Panna Cotta"	Thiru	Ganesh Kaarthic	19 January 2023
3	"The Wrong Turn"	Thiru	Ganesh Kaarthic	19 January 2023
4	"The Beginning of the End"	Thiru	Ganesh Kaarthic	19 January 2023

== Production ==
Ganesh Kaarthic wrote the script and approached Krishna in 2019 to produce the series. Ganesh Kaarthic and Krishna refined the script for over a year and a half before partnering with Disney+ Hotstar as the presenter. Krishna brought in director Thiru, who initially had reservations about the longer runtime but was convinced by the narration and ultimately directed the series. The team cast Anjali as the lead, seeking an actress who could perform action sequences. The series was filmed in Hyderabad, Munnar, and Goa over a period of one hundred and ten days. The budget for the first episode was one crore rupees. The action sequences were choreographed by Yannick Ben. The cinematography was by Arvind Kumar while the editing was handled by Lewellyn Gonsalvez.

== Reception ==
=== Season 1 ===
Srivathsan Nadadhur of OTTplay rated one-and-a-half out of five stars and wrote, "Jhansi is a poorly made web show - there are no two things about it. Anjali and Mumaith Khan deliver the goods while better writing and filmmaking could’ve salvaged it to an extent." Bhawana Tanmayi of The South First gave it three out of five stars and wrote, "The show has a solid story but the director fails to establish enough gripping scenes. The screenplay is bad."

Paul Nicodemus of The Times of India gave it two-and-a-half out of five stars and wrote, "the season with impressive performances and decent production values leaves the viewer high and dry with too many unanswered questions." A critic from 123telugu rated two-and-a-half out of five stars and wrote, "Jhansi has an exhilarating premise that is brought down by many flaws in the screenplay. Anjali gives her best in all possible ways, but the narration issues make this action thriller a strictly okay watch this weekend."

=== Season 2 ===
Paul Nicodemus of The Times of India gave it two-and-a-half out of five stars and wrote, "Season 2 of Jhansi answers the unanswered questions from season 1. While Anjali as Jhansi remains the focal point and delivers, the season needed better writing and screenplay." Latha Srinivasan of India Today rated one-and-a-half out of five stars and wrote, "Jhansi Season 2 is below average but those who are fans of women-centric series could attempt to watch it."
