= Vathikuchi =

2013 Indian film by P. Kinslin

- Theatrical release poster
- Directed by: P. Kinslin
- Written by: P. Kinslin
- Produced by: A. R. Murugadoss
- Starring: Dileepan; Anjali
- Cinematography: R. B. Gurudev
- Edited by: Praveen K. L. N. B. Srikanth
- Music by: Ghibran
- Production companies: AR Murugadoss Productions; Fox Star Studios
- Release date: 15 March 2013
- Country: India
- Language: Tamil

Vathikuchi (transl. Matchstick) is a 2013 Indian Tamil-language crime thriller film written and directed by newcomer P. Kinslin and produced by AR Murugadoss in association with Fox Star Studios. The film stars Dileepan, the younger brother of Murugadoss, in his acting debut and Anjali, while Jayaprakash, Sampath Raj and Jagan appear in supporting roles. The film, which has music composed by Ghibran, released on 15 March 2013.

== Plot ==
Sakthi is an auto rickshaw driver, who is in love with his neighbour, Leena. His life changes when he runs into three dangerous criminals who want him dead.

== Cast ==
- Dileepan as Sakthi
- Anjali as Leena/Meena
- Sampath Raj as Benny
- Jayaprakash as Gangariya
- Jagan as Vanaraj
- Mime Gopi as Natarajan
- Saranya Ponvannan as Sakthi's mother
- Pattimandram Raja as Sakthi's father
- Sathish as Karuvelamuthu
- Ashvin Raja as Puli Paandi
- Ravi Mariya as Benny's friend
- Sriranjani as Leena's mother
- Vatsan Chakravarthy as Praveen
- Bala Singh as Inspector
- Vaiyapuri as Constable
- Akhil Kumar as Golicha
- Angana Roy
- Rajashree
- Ravi
- Jasper as Nachiappan
- Visweswara Rao
- Ghajini Rajesh
- Pondy Ravi

== Production ==
The film was first announced in January when it was revealed that Murugadoss's brother Dileepan would make his debut as an actor in a venture to be co-produced by Fox Star Studios. The title Vathikuchi was derived from the song "Vathikuchi Pathikadhuda" from Murugadoss's directorial debut Dheena (2001). After winning accolades for her performance in Engaeyum Eppothum, Anjali was signed up by Murugadoss as the lead actress.

== Soundtrack ==
The soundtrack was composed by Ghibran. The audio launch was held on 13 February 2013. The song "Kanna Kanna" is set in Mishra Gara, a Hindustani raga. In a music review, Karthik of Milliblog wrote, "After an impressive debut like Vaagai Sooda Vaa, this is a fantastic sophomore effort from this talented composer!"

Track listing
No.	Title	Lyrics	Singer(s)	Length
1.	"Kuru Kuru"	Na. Muthukumar	Sundar Narayana Rao	04:30
2.	"Amma Wake Me Up"	Pa. Vijay, Shabir	Shruthi Ravi, Anitha Karthikeyan, Shabir	04:28
3.	"Kanna Kanna"	Arivumathi	Sundar Narayana Rao	04:54
4.	"Ari Unnai"	Yugabharathi	Shabir, Saisharan	04:11
5.	"Theme Music" (instrumental)	–	–	03:45
Total length:				21:48

== Marketing and release ==
Because the lead character is an auto rickshaw driver, the makers of Vathikuchi promoted the film through auto rickshaws. At least four or five branded auto rickshaws would travel through Madurai, Tiruchirappalli and Coimbatore for promoting the film. Vathikuchi was released on 15 March 2013.

=== Critical reception ===
Vivek Ramz from in.com rated it 3 out of 5 and stated that Vathikuchi is more brawny than brainy. He added that Director Kinslin shows promise in his debut film with different treatment for this somewhat clichéd story. His way of storytelling is realistic at times with very grounded level approach towards a common man issue. The problem with the film is that he has introduced too many characters and made few simple situations more complex which works at times and at other times backfired. Finally concluding that it's not a bad film at all and can be watched once! Karthik Subramanian of The Hindu wrote that the film "is not so much bad in the way it is executed but the story just gets progressively mind-numbingly stupid". Sify wrote, "Vathikuchi directed by P Kinslin is half baked and has too many plot holes. However, the first half of the film is quite entertaining, but post interval the film drags and a forced climax makes the debutant hero larger- than- life which sticks out like a sore thumb".

=== Box office ===
Vathikuchi opened at second place at the Chennai box office and Sify said it had an "above average opening", performing well mainly in single-screen theatres. In the second week of its release it remained at the same rank and was said not to be performing well in multiplexes when compared to single screens. By early April 2013, the film was at fourth, and Sify considered it an "average" performer.
