= Sundar Narayana Rao =

Indian singer

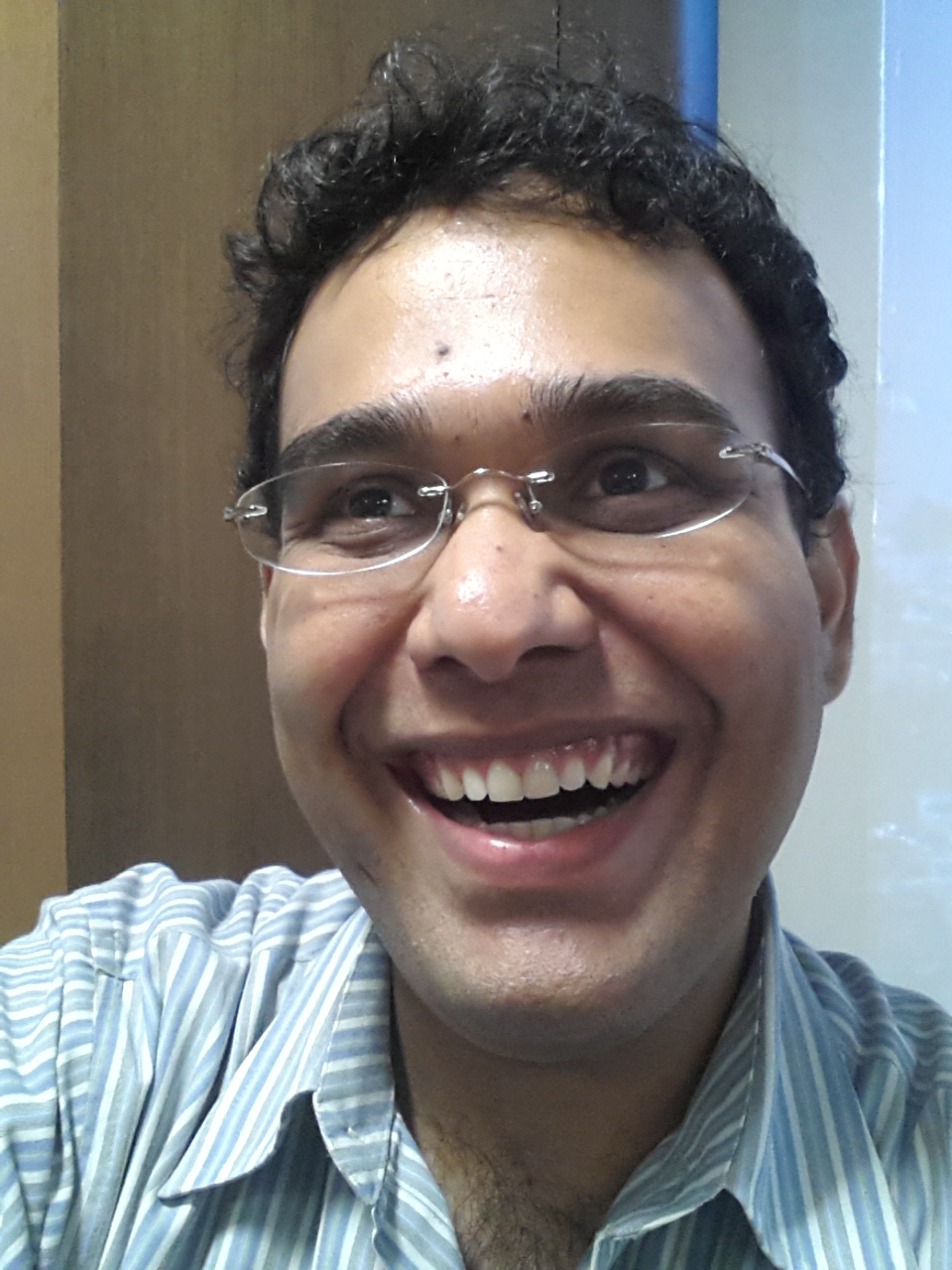
- Sundar Narayana Rao.

Background information
- Born: 30 January; India
- Genres: Indian classical music, Pakistani classical music, Afghani classical music, Thumri, Tappa, Natya Sangeet, Abhangs, Sufi, Qawwali, Playback singing
- Occupation: Singer
- Years active: 2013–2017

Sundar Narayana Rao (born: 30 January) is a former Indian playback singer, known for his work in Tamil films.

== Early life and career ==
Sundar Narayana Rao is originally a Thanjavur Marathi with a background in Hindustani classical music. He was trained in music since a child. He grew up in Chennai. He was noticed for his songs in Vathikuchi including "Kuru Kuru" and "Kanna Kanna". He simultaneously worked in software and has since retired from singing.

== Discography ==
=== As playback singer ===
==== Songs ====
- Note: all songs are in Tamil, unless otherwise noted.

Year	Film	Songs	Composer	Co-singer(s)
2013	Vathikuchi	"Kuru Kuru"	Ghibran	Solo
2013	Vathikuchi	"Kanna Kanna"	Ghibran	Solo
2013	Kutti Puli	"Aatha Un Selai"	Ghibran	Solo
2013	Kutti Puli	"Deivam Yellam Onnagi"	Ghibran	Solo
2013	Praanam Kosam (Telugu dub)	"Chura Chura"	Ghibran	Solo
2013	Praanam Kosam (Telugu dub)	"Kannu Kannu"	Ghibran	Solo
2013	Naiyaandi	"Ae Le Le Etti Paarthale"	Ghibran	with Leon D'Souza
2013	Naiyaandi	"Marriage Marketil"	Ghibran	Solo
2013	Thirumanam Ennum Nikkah	"Chillendra Chillendra"	Ghibran	with Kaushiki Chakrabarty
2014	Amara Kaaviyam	"Edhedho Ennamvandhu"	Ghibran	Solo
2015	Papanasam	"Yeya En Kottikkaaraa"	Ghibran	with Malavika Anilkumar
2017	Veeraiyan	"Aiyyo Aiyyo"	S. N. Arunagiri	Solo
2017	Kadugu	"Nilavedhu Karaiyedhu"	S. N. Arunagiri	with Vaikom Vijayalakshmi
2026	Biker - Tamil	"Munneru Munneru"	Ghibran	Solo
