= Krishna (Tamil actor) =

Indian actor (1978)

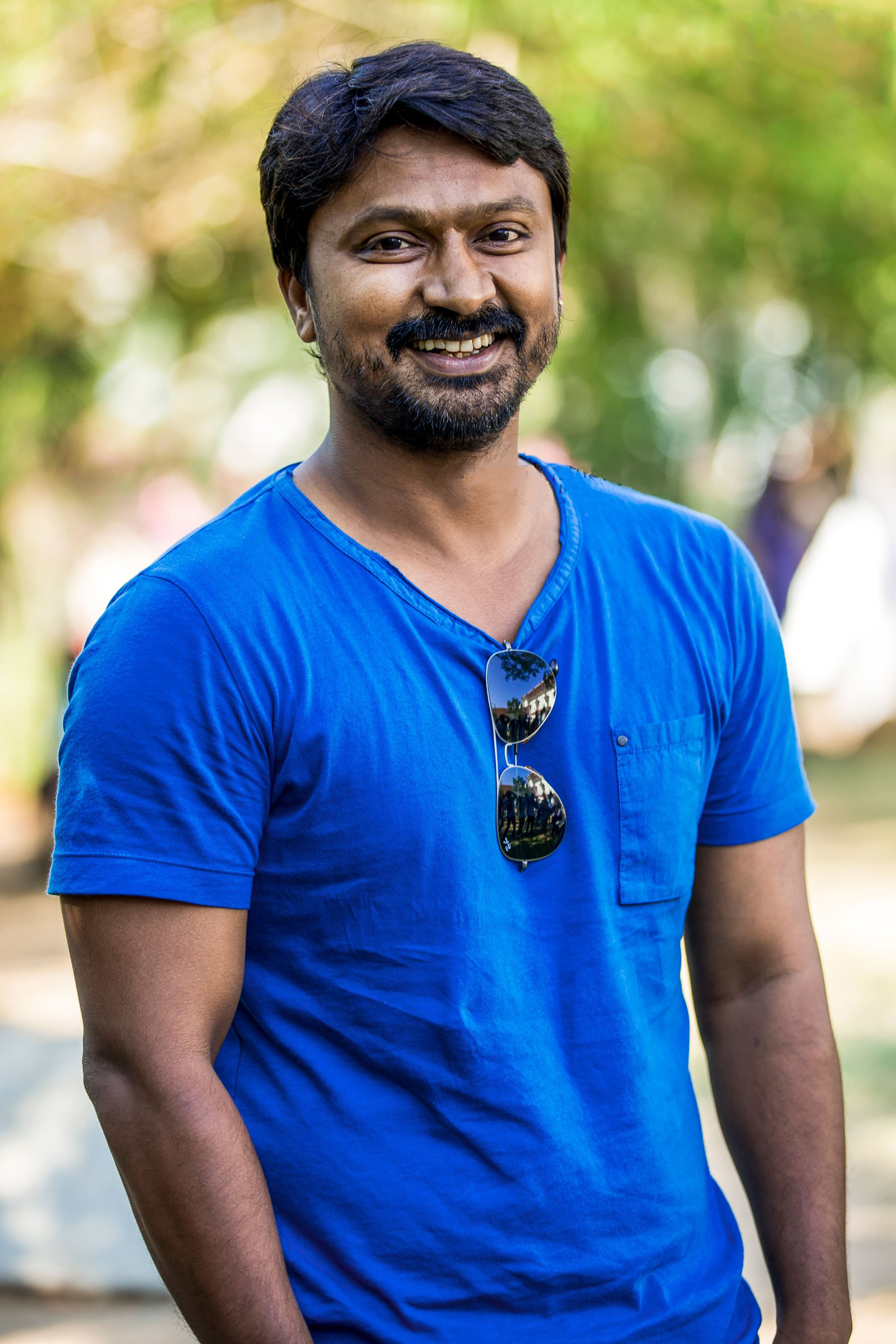
- Krishna at Vizhithiru Press Meet
- Born: Krishnakumar Kulasekaran; 14 February 1978 (age 48); Chennai, Tamil Nadu, India
- Occupation: Actor
- Years active: 1990–present
- Relatives: Vishnuvardhan (Brother)

Krishnakumar Kulasekaran (born 14 February 1978) credited as Krishna is an Indian actor who mainly appears in Tamil cinema. He is the younger brother of Tamil film director Vishnuvardhan.

== Early life ==
Krishna's father is film producer K.K.Sekar (Pattiyal Sekar) and his brother is noted film director, Vishnuvardhan. He went to St. Bede's Anglo Indian Higher Secondary School in Chennai, studied at Loyola College and graduated with an MBA in finance in the United States. He worked for a year and a half in the IT industry and started his own business that was doing well. He has also undergone training in Jazz and worked as a dancer/choreographer before he left for US.

== Career ==
As an actor, he first faced the camera for Mani Ratnam's Anjali and later appeared in Iruvar and Santosh Sivan's The Terrorist. He was also chosen to play the younger version of Rajinikanth's character in Thalapathi, but the character was later scrapped because it affected the film's length. He also starred in small role with Udhaya (2004).

He played his first lead role in Alibhabha, which was produced by his father. The film met with favourable reviews, but was not a commercial success. After his first film, he wanted to do a gangster film based on a true incident in North Madras, called Madras to be directed by Five Star Krishna, but it was shelved because of misunderstandings between the director and the producer. His next two films Kattradhu Kalavu (2010) and Kazhugu (2012) were also produced by his father. In Kazhugu he played someone who recovers bodies of suicide victims who jump off a cliff. It received positive response.

After appearing in a brief role in Vallinam (2014), he starred in RS Infotainment's horror comedy Yaamirukka Bayamey (2014). His next films were Vanavarayan Vallavarayan (2014) and Vanmam (2014). In 2015, he starred in action comedy Yatchan directed by his brother Vishnuvardhan. In 2017, he made his comeback including four thriller releases with Yaakkai, Pandigai, Nibunan and Vizhithiru. In 2018, he appeared in Veera, Kalari and Maari 2. He acted in Kazhugu 2 (2019), sequel to the 2012 film, Kazhugu. However, the film came out of mixed reviews.

== Filmography ==
=== As actor ===
Year	Title	Role	Notes
1990	Anjali	Colony kid	Child actor; uncredited
1997	Iruvar	Tamizhselvan's son	Supporting roles
1998	The Terrorist	Lover	Supporting roles
2004	Udhaya	Venkat Raman	Supporting roles
2008	Alibhabha	Velu	Nominated, Vijay Award for Best Debut Actor
2010	Kattradhu Kalavu	Krishnakumar	
2012	Kazhugu	Sera	
2014	Vallinam	Shiva	Guest appearance
2014	Yaamirukka Bayamey	Kiran	
2014	Vanavarayan Vallavarayan	Vanavarayan	
2014	Vanmam	Chelladurai	
2015	Yatchan	'Pazhani' Karthik	
2017	Yaakkai	Kathir	
2017	Pandigai	Velu	
2017	Nibunan	Christopher	
2017	Vizhithiru	Muthukumar	
2018	Veera	Veeramuthu	
2018	Kalari	Murugesan	
2018	Maari 2	Kalai	
2019	Kazhugu 2	Johnny	
2023	Rayar Parambarai	Arivu	
2024	Joshua: Imai Pol Kaakha	Koti	
2024	The Boys	Krishna	Guest appearance

=== As producer ===
Year	Title	Platform	Language	Notes
2018-2019	High Priestess	ZEE5	Telugu	Television series
2019-2020	Locked	AHA	Telugu	Television series
2022–2023	Jhansi	Disney+ Hotstar	Telugu	Television series
2024	Parachute	Disney+ Hotstar	Tamil	Television series
