= Sengathu Bhoomiyilae =

2012 Indian film by M. Rathnakumar

- Promotional Poster
- Directed by: M. Rathnakumar
- Produced by: Revathi Duraimurugan; Lakshmi
- Starring: Pawan; Senthil Kumar; Priyanka Nair; Sunu Lakshmi
- Music by: Ilayaraaja
- Production company: Swami Cine Arts
- Release date: 3 February 2012
- Country: India
- Language: Tamil

Sengathu Bhoomiyilae (transl. Red in the earth) is a 2012 Indian Tamil-language film directed by M. Rathnakumar and produced by Revathi Duraimurugan and Lakshmi. The film stars Pawan, Senthil Kumar, Priyanka Nair, Sunu Lakshmi, and Singampuli. The music was composed by Ilaiyaraaja. The film released on 3 February 2012 to generally mixed reviews.

== Plot ==
Two closely related families fall apart due to an unfortunate incident. It creates more issues widening the rift which snowballs into bigger and ends up in the losses of many lives that breaks the relationships. As they bay for each other's blood like sworn enemies, some innocent minds are affected by the rift and vengeance, creating disastrous result for everyone.

== Cast ==
- Pawan as Vallarasu
- Mirchi Senthil as Chinnasamy
- Priyanka Nair as Vairasilai (Vairam)
- Sunu Lakshmi as Sevakodi
- Singampuli as Ondippuli
- Stalin Muthu as Bose
- Vellai Pandi as Santhai Mayi
- Azhagan Thamizhmani as Malaichami
- Nivas
- Varun
- Vishnu Priya

== Soundtrack ==
The soundtrack was composed by Ilaiyaraaja, while lyrics written by Ilaiyaraaja (En Usuru) and Snehan.

- "Sikkikichu Sikkikichu" - Sunitha Rao, Prasanna
- "Oram Po Oram Po" - Priyadarshini, Sunitha Rao, V. V. Prasanna, Raagul
- "Kaathiruppen Kaathiruppen" - Rita
- "En Usuru Ennai Vittu" - Rita
- "Thiru Vizha Song" - Saravana Devi, Sakthivel Dindugul

== Reception ==
Upon release, Sengathu Bhoomiyilae received generally mixed reviews. The Hindu mentioned as "for a movie written by the same person who wrote Karuththamma and Kizhakku Cheemayile, Sengathu Bhoomiyilae has surprisingly with insipid dialogues and the actors were made do with a boxful of clichés, thus ends up diluting all characters". Deccan Chronicle gave the film 3 out of 5, mentioning "The director was able to convey the message effectively with interesting twists and turns despite a lesser-known cast. A well-made film, worth a watch!".
