= Hiphop Tamizha discography =

Hiphop Tamizha
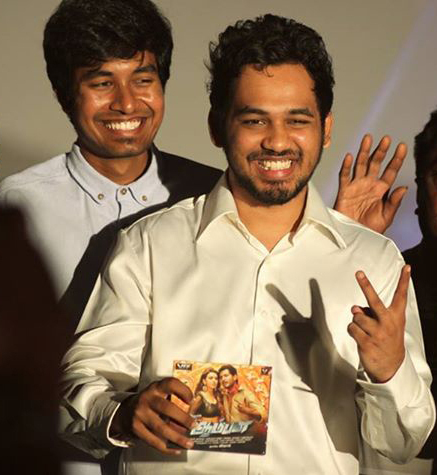
- Jeeva R (L) and Adhithya "Adhi" Venkatapathy (R) during Aambala's audio launch

Background information
- Genre: Hip hop
- Years active: 2005–present
- Members: Adhi; Jeeva
- Website: hiphoptamizha.com

This is the discography of Hiphop Tamizha, an Indian musical duo consisting of Adhi and Jeeva.

== Studio albums ==
Year	Title	Tracks	Music label	Ref.
2012	Hip Hop Tamizhan	11	Think Music	
2020	Naa Oru Alien	6	Think Music	
2024	UNO	6	Underground Tribe	

== Singles ==
Year	Song	Notes	Ref.
2010	"Excuse Me Kathali"		
2011	"Ezhuvoam Vaa"	Anthem for Tamil Nadu's 2011 state elections	
2012	"Club le Mabbu le"	Club le Mabbu le was first sung at 98.3 FM Radio station in 2011.Later it was officially released in 2012	
2013	"Nice Vs Naughty (Na Na Na)"	Song used in the promotion of The Smurfs 2 in India. And first song as a film music director.	
2014	" Vaadi Pulla Vaadi "	From dropped album International Tamizhan; Later used in the 2017 film Meesaya Murukku	
2014	"Poda"	Song celebrating the 10th anniversary of Sun Music	
2016	"Takkaru Takkaru"	Song celebrating Jallikattu	
2017	"Kovai Gethu"	Official theme song for the Coimbatore city celebration initiative started by The Times of India	
2018	"Maanavan"		
2019	"Tamizhi"	Promotional song	
2020	"Quarantine & Chill"	Song composed after requests by fans during the quarantine due to COVID-19 pandemic	
2022	"Oorukaaran"		
2022	"Chinna Paiyan"		
2022	"Nadanthavaraikumey"		
2023	"Poi Poi Poi"		
2023	"International"		

== Film scores and soundtracks ==
All the films are in Tamil, unless otherwise noted.

Key
†	Denotes films that have not yet been released

Year	Title	Notes	Music label	Ref.
2015	Aambala		V Music; Saregama (One track)	
2015	Indru Netru Naalai		Think Music	
2015	Thani Oruvan		Sony Music	
2016	Aranmanai 2		Think Music	
2016	Kathakali		V Music	
2016	Dhruva	Telugu film Remake of Thani Oruvan	Aditya Music; Sony Music (One track)	
2016	Kaththi Sandai		Sony Music	
2017	Kavan		AGS Entertainment; Divo	
2017	Meesaya Murukku		Think Music	
2018	Kalakalappu 2		Think Music	
2018	Krishnarjuna Yudham	Telugu film	Lahari Music; T-Series	
2018	Imaikkaa Nodigal		Think Music	
2019	Vantha Rajavathaan Varuven		Saregama	
2019	Natpe Thunai		Think Music	
2019	Mr. Local		Think Music	
2019	Comali		Sony Music	
2019	Action		Muzik247	
2020	Naan Sirithal		Think Music	
2021	A1 Express	Telugu film Remake of Natpe Thunai	Think Music	
2021	Sivakumarin Sabadham		Think Music	
2022	Anbarivu		Lahari Music; T-Series	
2023	Agent	Telugu film	Lahari Music; T-Series	
2023	Veeran		Saregama	
2024	Aranmanai 4		Think Music	
2024	PT Sir		Think Music	25th film
2024	Buddy	Telugu film	Junglee Music	
2024	Kadaisi Ulaga Por		Think Music	
2026	Meesaya Murukku 2		Saregama	
2026	Mookuthi Amman 2		Vels Music International	
TBA	Purushan †		Saregama	
TBA	Aalambana †		Sony Music	

=== Television ===
Year	Title	Director	Notes	Ref.
2017	Nandini	Raj Kapoor	Title song	

=== Web series ===
Year	Title	Director	Composer	Producer	Ref.
2019	Tamizhi	Pradeep Kumar	Hiphop Tamizha	Hiphop Tamizha	
2021	Thee Veeran	Hiphop Tamizha	Hiphop Tamizha	Hiphop Tamizha	

== As a singer ==
Year	Song	Film	Composer	Ref.
2012	"Thappellam Thappe Illai"	Naan	Vijay Antony	
2012	"Silai Pohla"	Simmasanam — The Throne	Mc Sai	
2012	"Raja Raja Cholan"	Simmasanam — The Throne	Mc Sai	
2013	"Nice Vs Naughty (Na Na Na)"	The Smurfs 2	Hiphop Tamizha	
2013	"Ethir Neechal"	Ethir Neechal	Anirudh Ravichander	
2013	"Chennai City Gangsta"	Vanakkam Chennai	Anirudh Ravichander	
2014	"Vaada Kannue (Remix)"	Sivappu Enakku Pidikkum	Siva Saravanan, Amish Yuvani	
2014	"Pakkam Vanthu"	Kaththi	Anirudh Ravichander	
2015	"Pazhagikalaam"	Aambala	Hiphop Tamizha	
2015	"Aye Aye Aye"	Aambala	Hiphop Tamizha	
2015	"Inbam Pongum Vennila (Remix)"	Aambala	Hiphop Tamizha	
2015	"Naam Vaazhndhidum"	Vai Raja Vai	Yuvan Shankar Raja	
2015	"iPhone 6 Nee Yendral"	Indru Netru Naalai	Hiphop Tamizha	
2015	"Naane Thaan Raja"	Indru Netru Naalai	Hiphop Tamizha	
2015	"Theemai Dhaan Vellum"	Thani Oruvan	Hiphop Tamizha	
2015	"Thani Oruvan"	Thani Oruvan	Hiphop Tamizha	
2016	"Azhage"	Kathakali	Hiphop Tamizha	
2016	"Erangi Vandhu"	Kathakali	Hiphop Tamizha	
2016	"Party with the Pei"	Aranmanai 2	Hiphop Tamizha	
2016	"Poraada Poraada"	Aranmanai 2	Hiphop Tamizha	
2016	"Amma (Amman Song)"	Aranmanai 2	Hiphop Tamizha	
2016	"Neethoney Dance"	Dhruva	Hiphop Tamizha	
2016	"Manishi Musugulo Mrugam neney ra"	Dhruva	Hiphop Tamizha	
2016	"Kaththi Sandai Theme"	Kaththi Sandai	Hiphop Tamizha	
2016	"Kaththi Sandai"	Kaththi Sandai	Hiphop Tamizha	
2016	"Ellame Kaasu"	Kaththi Sandai	Hiphop Tamizha	
2016	"Naan Konjam Karuppu"	Kaththi Sandai	Hiphop Tamizha	
2017	"Happy New Year"	Kavan	Hiphop Tamizha	
2017	"Theeratha Vilayaatu Pillai"	Kavan	Hiphop Tamizha	
2017	"Oxygen"	Kavan	Hiphop Tamizha	
2017	"Boomerang"	Kavan	Hiphop Tamizha	
2017	"Great Ji"	Meesaya Murukku	Hiphop Tamizha	
2017	"Machi Engalukku"	Meesaya Murukku	Hiphop Tamizha	
2017	"Enna Nadandhalum"	Meesaya Murukku	Hiphop Tamizha	
2017	"Vaadi Nee Vaa"	Meesaya Murukku	Hiphop Tamizha	
2017	"Meesaya Murukku Title Track"	Meesaya Murukku	Hiphop Tamizha	
2017	"Sakkarakatti"	Meesaya Murukku	Hiphop Tamizha	
2017	"Vaadi Pulla Vaadi"	Meesaya Murukku	Hiphop Tamizha	
2018	"Thaarumaaru"	Kalakalappu 2	Hiphop Tamizha	
2018	"Pudichiruka Illa Pudikalaya"	Kalakalappu 2	Hiphop Tamizha	
2018	"I Wanna Fly"	Krishnarjuna Yudham	Hiphop Tamizha	
2018	"Turn This Party Up"	Krishnarjuna Yudham	Hiphop Tamizha	
2018	"Ela Ela"	Krishnarjuna Yudham	Hiphop Tamizha	
2018	"Kadhalikathey"	Imaikkaa Nodigal	Hiphop Tamizha	
2018	"Vilambara Idaiveli"	Imaikkaa Nodigal	Hiphop Tamizha	
2018	"Red Cardu"	Vantha Rajavathaan Varuven	Hiphop Tamizha	
2018	"Paravaigal"	Vantha Rajavathaan Varuven	Hiphop Tamizha	
2018	"Kerala Song"	Natpe Thunai	Hiphop Tamizha	
2019	"Aathadi"	Natpe Thunai	Hiphop Tamizha	
2019	"Veedhikor Jaadhi"	Natpe Thunai	Hiphop Tamizha	
2019	"Morattu Single"	Natpe Thunai	Hiphop Tamizha	
2019	"Vengamavan"	Natpe Thunai	Hiphop Tamizha	
2019	"Madham Madham"	Natpe Thunai	Hiphop Tamizha	
2019	"Mr.Local Theme"	Mr. Local	Hiphop Tamizha	
2019	"Paisa Note"	Comali	Hiphop Tamizha	
2019	"Yaara Comali"	Comali	Hiphop Tamizha	
2019	"Tamizhi"	Tamizhi	Hiphop Tamizha	
2019	"Weightu"	Weightu	Mad Panda	
2019	"Light Camera Action"	Action	Hiphop Tamizha	
2019	"Breakup Song"	Naan Sirithal	Hiphop Tamizha	
2019	"Dhom Dhom"	Naan Sirithal	Hiphop Tamizha	
2020	"Ajukku Gumukku"	Naan Sirithal	Hiphop Tamizha	
2020	"Keka Beka"	Naan Sirithal	Hiphop Tamizha	
2020	"Odavum Mudiyathu Oliyavum Mudiyathu"	Odavum Mudiyadhu Oliyavum Mudiyadhu	Kaushik Krish	
2021	"Bahubalikkoru Kattappa"	Sivakumarin Sabadham	Hiphop Tamizha	
2021	"Thillalangadi Lady"	Sivakumarin Sabadham	Hiphop Tamizha	
2021	"Ore Punnagai"	Sivakumarin Sabadham	Hiphop Tamizha	
2022	"Oorukulla Pudusa"	Aalambana	Hiphop Tamizha	
2022	"Oorukaaran"		Hiphop Tamizha	
2022	"Thiyagi Boys"	Coffee with Kadhal	Yuvan Shankar Raja	
2023	"Thunderkaaran"	Veeran	Hiphop Tamizha	
2023	"Papara Mitta"	Veeran	Hiphop Tamizha	
2023	"Veeran Thiruvizha"	Veeran	Hiphop Tamizha	
2023	"Andome Kidukidunga"	Veeran	Hiphop Tamizha	
2024	"Kutty Pisasae"	PT Sir	Hiphop Tamizha	
2024	"Nakkal Pudichavan"	PT Sir	Hiphop Tamizha	
2024	"Poraadu Sirage"	PT Sir	Hiphop Tamizha	
2024	"Tonta Toin"	PT Sir	Hiphop Tamizha	
2024	"Kanagavel Kaaka"	PT Sir	Hiphop Tamizha	
2024	"Aa Pilla Kanule - Buddy's Love"	Buddy	Hiphop Tamizha	
2024	"Feel Of Buddy - I Just Want To Know"	Buddy	Hiphop Tamizha	

== Music video appearances ==
Year	Song	Album/film	Composer	Ref.
2010	"Excuse Me Kathali"	Non-album singles	Hiphop Tamizha	
2011	"Ezhuvoam Vaa"	Non-album singles	Hiphop Tamizha	
2012	"Club le Mabbu le"	Hip Hop Tamizhan	Hiphop Tamizha	
2013	"Manithan Tamizhan"	Hip Hop Tamizhan	Hiphop Tamizha	
2013	"Iraiva"	Hip Hop Tamizhan	Hiphop Tamizha	
2013	"Nice Vs Naughty (Na Na Na)"	Indian promotional song of The Smurfs 2	Hiphop Tamizha	
2013	"Chennai City Gangsta"	Vanakkam Chennai	Anirudh Ravichander	
2014	"Vaadi Pulla Vaadi"	Non-album singles	Hiphop Tamizha	
2014	"Poda"	Non-album singles	Hiphop Tamizha	
2015	"Inbam Pongum Vennila" (Remix)	Aambala	Hiphop Tamizha	
2015	"Theemai Dhaan Vellum"	Thani Oruvan	Hiphop Tamizha	
2016	"Party with the Pei"	Aranmanai 2	Hiphop Tamizha	
2016	"Manishi Musugulo Mrugam Neney Ra"	Dhruva (reused footage from Thani Oruvan)	Hiphop Tamizha	
2016	"Takkaru Takkaru"	Non-album singles	Hiphop Tamizha	
2017	"Kovai Gethu"	Non-album singles	Hiphop Tamizha	
2018	"Maanavan"	Non-album singles	Hiphop Tamizha	
2019	"Tamizhi"	Tamizhi	Hiphop Tamizha	
2019	"Weightu"	Weightu	MadPanda	
2020	"Yaarumey Venam"	Naa Oru Alien	Hiphop Tamizha	
2022	"Oorukaaran"	Non-album singles	Hiphop Tamizha	
2022	"Chinna Paiyan"	Non-album singles	Hiphop Tamizha	
2022	"Baby Wassup"	1 minute music video	Hiphop Tamizha	
2023	"Nadanthavaraikumey"	Non-album singles	Hiphop Tamizha	
2023	"Poi Poi Poi"	Non-album singles	Hiphop Tamizha	

== Song list ==
=== 2010s ===
Year	Song	Album/film	Credits		
Year	Song	Album/film	Vocal	Lyric	Music
2010	"Excuse me Kathali"	Non-album singles	✓	✓	✓
2011	"Ezhuvoam Vaa"	Non-album singles	✓	✓	✓
2012	"Thappellam Thappe Illai"	Naan	✓	✓	✗
2012	"Manithan Tamizhan (Intro)"	Hip Hop Tamizhan	✓	✓	✓
2012	"Tamizhanda"	Hip Hop Tamizhan	✓	✓	✓
2012	"Tamizh Theriyum"	Hip Hop Tamizhan	✓	✓	✓
2012	"Club Le Mabbu Le"	Hip Hop Tamizhan	✓	✓	✓
2012	"Sentamizh Penne"	Hip Hop Tamizhan	✓	✓	✓
2012	"Ini Illaye Hum"	Hip Hop Tamizhan	✓	✓	✓
2012	"Cheap Popularity (Skit)"	Hip Hop Tamizhan	✓	✓	✓
2012	"Iraiva"	Hip Hop Tamizhan	✓	✓	✓
2012	"Karpom Karpipom"	Hip Hop Tamizhan	✓	✓	✓
2012	"Hey do what I say"	Hip Hop Tamizhan	✓	✓	✓
2012	"Stop piracy (Outro)"	Hip Hop Tamizhan	✓	✓	✓
2012	"Silai Pohla"	Simmasanam — The Throne	✓	✓	✗
2012	"Raja Raja Cholan"	Simmasanam — The Throne	✓	✓	✗
2013	"Sudden Delight"	Soodhu Kavvum	✗	✓	✗
2013	"Nice Vs Naughty (Na Na Na)"	Indian promotional song of The Smurfs 2	✓	✓	✓
2013	"Ethir Neechal"	Ethir Neechal	✓	✓	✗
2013	"Chennai City Gangsta"	Vanakkam Chennai	✓	✓	✗
2014	"Poda"	Non-album single	✓	✓	✓
2014	"Vaada Kannue (Remix)"	Sivappu Enakku Pidikum	✓	✓	✗
2014	"Vaadi Pulla Vaadi"	Non-album single	✓	✓	✓
2014	"Pakkam Vanthu"	Kaththi	✓	✓	✗
2015	"Madras To Madurai"	Aambala	✗	✓	✓
2015	"Pazhagihkalaam"	Aambala	✓	✓	✓
2015	"Vaa Vaa Vaa Vennila"	Aambala	✗	✓	✓
2015	"Aye Aye Aye"	Aambala	✓	✓	✓
2015	"Yaar Enna Sonnalum"	Aambala	✗	✓	✓
2015	"Inbam Pongum Vennila"	Aambala	✓	✓	✓
2015	"Naam Vaazhndhidum"	Vai Raja Vai	✓	✓	✗
2015	"iPhone 6 Nee Yendral"	Indru Netru Naalai	✓	✓	✓
2015	"Kadhale Kadhale"	Indru Netru Naalai	✗	✗	✓
2015	"Naane Thaan Raja"	Indru Netru Naalai	✓	✓	✓
2015	"Indru Netru Naalai"	Indru Netru Naalai	✗	✓	✓
2015	"The Conquest of Time Theme"	Indru Netru Naalai	-	-	✓
2015	"Thani Oruvan"	Thani Oruvan	✓	✓	✓
2015	"Kannala Kannala"	Thani Oruvan	✗	✓	✓
2015	"Kadhal Cricket"	Thani Oruvan	✗	✓	✓
2015	"Theemai Dhaan Vellum"	Thani Oruvan	✓	✓	✓
2015	"Aasai Peraasai"	Thani Oruvan	✗	✗	✓
2016	"Party With The Pei"	Aranmanai 2	✓	✓	✓
2016	"Maya Maya"	Aranmanai 2	✗	✗	✓
2016	"Poraadaa Poraadaa"	Aranmanai 2	✓	✓	✓
2016	"Kuchi Mittai"	Aranmanai 2	✗	✓	✓
2016	"Amma" (The Amman Song)	Aranmanai 2	✓	✗	✓
2016	"Aranmanai 2" (Instrumental)	Aranmanai 2	-	-	✓
2016	"Azhage"	Kathakali	✓	✓	✓
2016	"Kathakali Theme" (Instrumental)	Kathakali	-	-	✓
2016	"Erangi Vandhu"	Kathakali	✓	✓	✓
2016	"Kathakali Whistle" (Instrumental)	Kathakali	-	-	✓
2016	"Takkaru Takkaru"	Non-album single	✓	✓	✓
2016	"Dhruva Dhruva"	Dhruva	✗	✗	✓
2016	"Choosa Choosa"	Dhruva	✗	✗	✓
2016	"Pareshanuraaa"	Dhruva	✗	✗	✓
2016	"Neethoney Dance Tonight"	Dhruva	✓	✗	✓
2016	"Manishi Musugulo Mrugam Neney Ra"	Dhruva	✗	✗	✓
2016	"Naan Konjum Karuppu Thaan"	Kaththi Sandai	✓	✓	✓
2016	"Kaththi Sandai"	Kaththi Sandai	✓	✓	✓
2016	"Idhayam Idhayam"	Kaththi Sandai	✗	✗	✓
2016	"Ellame Kaasu"	Kaththi Sandai	✓	✓	✓
2016	"Kaththi Sandai Theme"	Kaththi Sandai	✗	✓	✓
2017	"Happy New Year"	Kavan	✓	✗	✓
2017	"Oxygen"	Kavan	✓	✗	✓
2017	"Theeratha Vilayattu Pillai"	Kavan	✓	✗	✓
2017	"Mathuraangalam"	Kavan	✗	✗	✓
2017	"Boomerang"	Kavan	✓	✗	✓
2017	"Vetri Meethu Vetri Vandhu - Reprised"	Kavan	✗	✗	✓
2017	"Great Ji"	Meesaya Murukku	✓	✓	✓
2017	"Machi Enggalukku Ellam"	Meesaya Murukku	✓	✓	✓
2017	"Enna Nadanthalum"	Meesaya Murukku	✓	✓	✓
2017	"Maatikichu"	Meesaya Murukku	✗	✓	✓
2017	"Vaadi Nee Vaa"	Meesaya Murukku	✓	✓	✓
2017	"Meesaya Murukku – Title Track"	Meesaya Murukku	✓	✓	✓
2017	"Sakkarakatti"	Meesaya Murukku	✓	✓	✓
2017	"Vaadi Pulla Vaadi"	Meesaya Murukku	✓	✓	✓
2017	"Kovai Gethu"	Non-album single	✓	✓	✓
2018	"Oru Kuchi Oru Kulfi"	Kalakalappu 2	✗	✓	✓
2018	"Karaikudi Ilavarasi"	Kalakalappu 2	✗	✗	✓
2018	"Thaarumaaru"	Kalakalappu 2	✓	✓	✓
2018	"Pudichiruka Illa Pudikalaya"	Kalakalappu 2	✓	✓	✓
2018	"Krishna Mukundha"	Kalakalappu 2	✗	✗	✓
2018	"I Wanna Fly"	Krishnarjuna Yudham	✓	✓	✓
2018	"Urime Manase"	Krishnarjuna Yudham	✗	✗	✓
2018	"Dhaari Choodu"	Krishnarjuna Yudham	✗	✗	✓
2018	"Turn This Party Up"	Krishnarjuna Yudham	✓	✓	✓
2018	"Ela Ela"	Krishnarjuna Yudham	✓	✗	✓
2018	"Thaaney Vachhindhanaa"	Krishnarjuna Yudham	✗	✗	✓
2018	"Kadhalikathey"	Imaikkaa Nodigal	✓	✓	✓
2018	"Vilambara Idaiveli"	Imaikkaa Nodigal	✓	✗	✓
2018	"Neeyum Naanum Anbe"	Imaikkaa Nodigal	✗	✗	✓
2018	"Kadhal Oru Aagayam"	Imaikkaa Nodigal	✗	✗	✓
2018	"Lion vs Hyenas"	Imaikkaa Nodigal	✗	✗	✓
2018	"Rudra’s Symphony"	Imaikkaa Nodigal	-	-	✓
2018	"Imaikkaa Nodiyil"	Imaikkaa Nodigal	✗	✓	✓
2018	"Ulaga Azhagiye Neeyaa"	Imaikkaa Nodigal	✗	✓	✓
2018	"Maanavan"	Non-album single	✓	✓	✓
2019	"Red Cardu"	Vantha Rajavathaan Varuven	✓	✗	✓
2019	"Vanga Machchan Vanga"	Vantha Rajavathaan Varuven	✗	✓	✓
2019	"Onnukku Renda"	Vantha Rajavathaan Varuven	✗	✗	✓
2019	"Pattamarangal"	Vantha Rajavathaan Varuven	✗	✓	✓
2019	"Modern Muniyamma"	Vantha Rajavathaan Varuven	✗	✗	✓
2019	"Paravaigal"	Vantha Rajavathaan Varuven	✓	✓	✓
2019	"Kerala Song"	Natpe Thunai	✓	✓	✓
2019	"Single Pasanga"	Natpe Thunai	✗	✗	✓
2019	"Aathadi"	Natpe Thunai	✓	✓	✓
2019	"Pallikoodam - The Farewell Song"	Natpe Thunai	✗	✓	✓
2019	"Veedhikor Jaadhi"	Natpe Thunai	✓	✓	✓
2019	"Morattu Single"	Natpe Thunai	✓	✓	✓
2019	"Vengamavan"	Natpe Thunai	✓	✓	✓
2019	"Natpe Thunai - Title Track"	Natpe Thunai	✗	✗	✓
2019	"Madham Madham"	Natpe Thunai	✓	✓	✓
2019	"Keezh Veezhndhal"	Natpe Thunai	✓	✓	✓
2019	"Takkunu Takkunu"	Mr. Local	✗	✗	✓
2019	"Kalakkalu Mr Localu"	Mr. Local	✗	✗	✓
2019	"Menaminiki"	Mr. Local	✗	✗	✓
2019	"Mr. Local Theme"	Mr. Local	✓	✓	✓
2019	"Nee Nenacha"	Mr. Local	✗	✓	✓
2019	"Paisa Note"	Comali	✓	✓	✓
2019	"Yaara Comali"	Comali	✓	✓	✓
2019	"Oliyum Oliyum"	Comali	✗	✗	✓
2019	"Hi Sonna Pothum"	Comali	✗	✗	✓
2019	"Nanba Nanba"	Comali	✗	✓	✓
2019	"Tamizhi"	Tamizhi	✓	✓	✓
2019	"Weightu"	Weightu	✓	✓	✗
2019	"Nee Sirichalum"	Action	✗	✗	✓
2019	"Lights Camera Action"	Action	✓	✓	✓
2019	"Maula Maula"	Action	✗	✗	✓
2019	"Azhage"	Action	✗	✓	✓
2019	"Fiyah Fiyah"	Action	✗	✓	✓

=== 2020s ===
Year	Song	Album/film	Credits		
Year	Song	Album/film	Vocal	Lyric	Music
2020	"BreakUp Song"	Naan Sirithal	✓	✓	✓
2020	"Dhom Dhom"	Naan Sirithal	✓	✓	✓
2020	"Ajukku Gumukku"	Naan Sirithal	✓	✗	✓
2020	"Happy Birthday"	Naan Sirithal	✗	✓	✓
2020	"Keka Beka"	Naan Sirithal	✓	✓	✓
2020	"Naan Siricha"	Naan Sirithal	✗	✓	✓
2020	"Quarantine & Chill"	Non-album single	✓	✓	✓
2020	"Odavum Mudiyathu Oliyavum Mudiyathu"	Odavum Mudiyadhu Oliyavum Mudiyadhu	✓	✗	✗
2020	"Net ah Thorandha"	Naa Oru Alien	✓	✓	✓
2020	"Dark Thoughts"	Naa Oru Alien	✓	✓	✓
2020	"Ellamey Konja Kaalam"	Naa Oru Alien	✓	✓	✓
2020	"Inayam"	Naa Oru Alien	✓	✓	✓
2020	"Pogattum Pogattum Po"	Naa Oru Alien	✓	✓	✓
2020	"Yaarumey Venam"	Naa Oru Alien	✓	✓	✓
2020	"Single Kingulam"	A1 Express (Telugu remake of Natpe Thunai)	✗	✗	✓
2021	"Amigo"	A1 Express (Telugu remake of Natpe Thunai)	✗	✗	✓
2021	"Veedhikoka Jaathi"	A1 Express (Telugu remake of Natpe Thunai)	✗	✗	✓
2021	"Telavaarutunte"	A1 Express (Telugu remake of Natpe Thunai)	✗	✗	✓
2021	"Seatu Siragadha"	A1 Express (Telugu remake of Natpe Thunai)	✗	✗	✓
2021	"Puttibhoomi"	A1 Express (Telugu remake of Natpe Thunai)	✗	✗	✓
2021	"Poratamey"	A1 Express (Telugu remake of Natpe Thunai)	✗	✗	✓
2021	"Charitraney Likhinchara"	A1 Express (Telugu remake of Natpe Thunai)	✗	✗	✓
2021	"Sivakumar Pondati"	Sivakumarin Sabadham	✗	✓	✓
2021	"Bahubaliku Oru Kattappa"	Sivakumarin Sabadham	✓	✓	✓
2021	"Neruppa Irupaan"	Sivakumarin Sabadham	✗	✓	✓
2021	"Thillalangadi Lady"	Sivakumarin Sabadham	✓	✓	✓
2021	"Middle Class"	Sivakumarin Sabadham	✗	✗	✓
2021	"Nesamae"	Sivakumarin Sabadham	✗	✗	✓
2021	"Orey Punnagai"	Sivakumarin Sabadham	✓	✓	✓
2021	"Arakkiyae"	Anbarivu	✗	✗	✓
2021	"Ready Steady Go"	Anbarivu	✗	✗	✓
2022	"Kanavugal"	Anbarivu	✗	✗	✓
2022	"Kalangathey"	Anbarivu	✗	✓	✓
2022	"Thanga Sela"	Anbarivu	✗	✗	✓
2022	"Kannirendum"	Anbarivu	✗	✗	✓
2022	"Anbae Arivu"	Anbarivu	✗	✓	✓
2022	"Eppa Paarthaalum"	Aalambana	✗	✗	✓
2022	"Opening Song Ithu"	Aalambana	✗	✗	✓
2022	"Oorukulla Pudusa"	Aalambana	✓	✗	✓
2022	"Aalambana Enga"	Aalambana	✗	✗	✓
2022	"Boomba Boomba"	Aalambana	✗	✗	✓
2022	"Oorukaaran"	Non-album singles	✓	✓	✓
2022	"Thiyagi Boys"	Coffee with Kadhal	✓	✗	✗
2022	"Chinna Paiyan"	Non-album singles	✓	✓	✓
2022	"Nadanthavaraikumey"	Non-album singles	✓	✓	✓
2022	"Baby Wassup"	1 minute music	✓	✓	✓
2023	"Poi Poi Poi"	Non-album singles	✓	✓	✓
2023	"International"	Non-album singles	✓	✓	✓
2023	"Malli Malli"	Agent	✓	✗	✓
2023	"Endhe Endhe"	Agent	✓	✗	✓
2023	"Rama Krishna"	Agent	✗	✗	✓
2023	"Wild Saala"	Agent	✗	✗	✓
2023	"Thunderkaaran"	Veeran	✓	✗	✓
2023	"Papara Mitta"	Veeran	✓	✗	✓
2023	"Veeran Thiruvizha"	Veeran	✓	✗	✓
2023	"Andome Kidukidunga"	Veeran	✓	✗	✓
2024	"Kutty Pisasae"	PT Sir	✓	✓	✓
2024	"Nakkal Pudichavan"	PT Sir	✓	✗	✓
2024	"Poraadu Sirage"	PT Sir	✓	✗	✓
2024	"Tonta Toin"	PT Sir	✓	✓	✓
2024	"Kanagavel Kaaka"	PT Sir	✓	✓	✓
