= Kharesma Ravichandran =

Playback singer

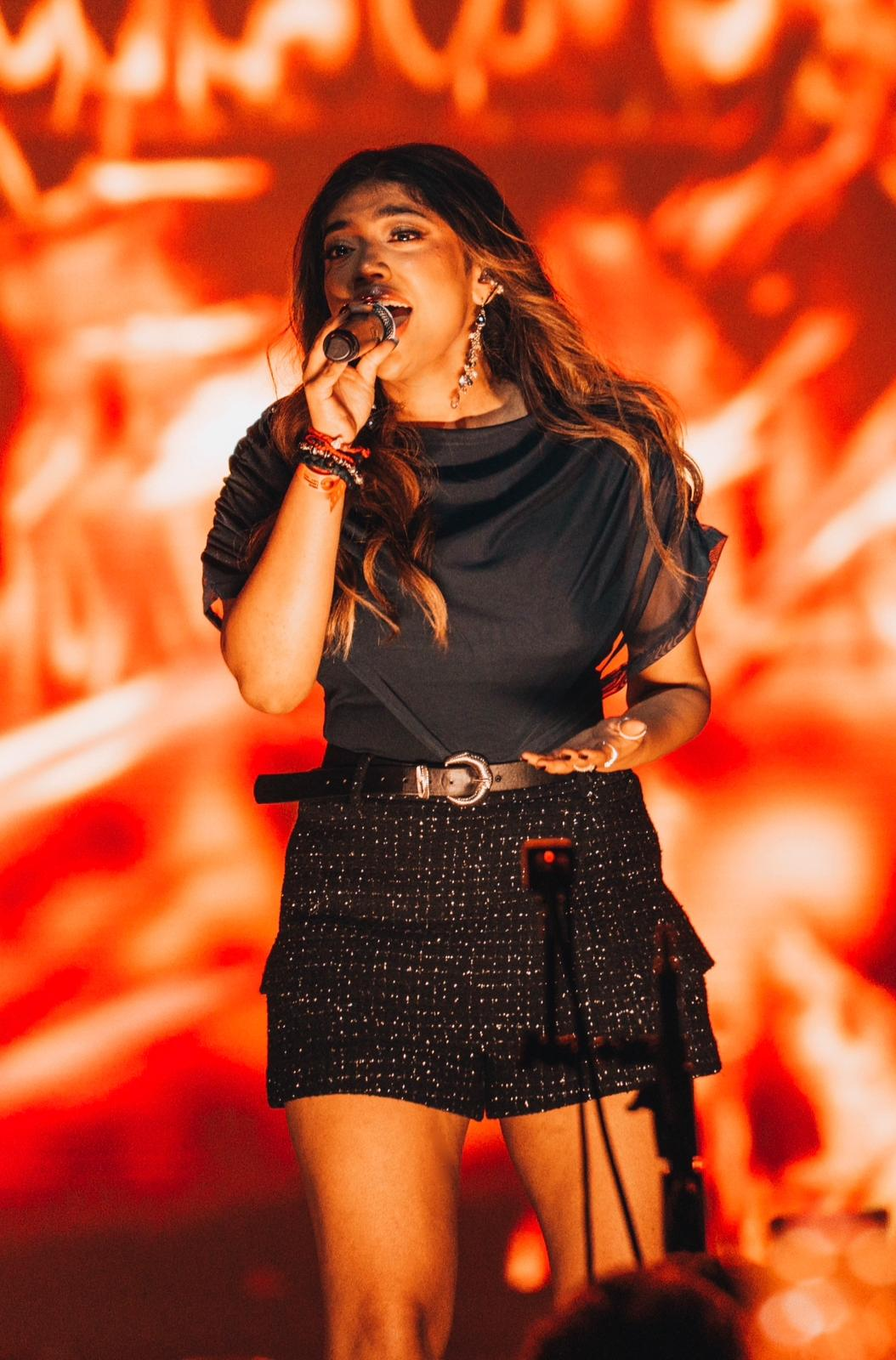
- Born: 8 May 2000 (age 26); London, England
- Years active: 2015–present

Kharesma Ravichandran (born 8 May 2000) is a British playback singer for Tamil cinema films. Her first public performance came at the age of four for the British Heart Foundation. A professionally trained western vocalist, Ravichandran began her playback singing career in 2014, and made her debut in the Tamil film Yennai Arindhaal (2015). She is currently signed as an independent artist under Hiphop Tamizha’s label “Underground”. She studied at Royal Holloway, University of London.

== Career ==
She started her career as an Indian playback singer for a Gautham Vasudev Menon film Yennai Arindhaal with the song "Yaen Ennai" composed by Harris Jayaraj. Her rise to fame was then triggered in part by the song "Kadhal Cricketu" in the film Thani Oruvan, composed by Hiphop Tamizha duo Aadhi and Jeeva. The song "Kadhal Cricket" was a success, and she had another successful song "Party with the Pei" in Aranmanai 2 by Sundar C, again composed by Hiphop Thamizha.

== Discography ==
Year	Film	Song	Music composer	Co-singer(s)
2015	Yennai Arindhaal	"Yaen Ennai"	Harris Jayaraj	Sunitha Sarathy
2015	Thani Oruvan	"Kadhal Cricket"	Hiphop Tamizha	Solo
2016	Aranmanai 2	"Party With The Pei"	Hiphop Tamizha	Hiphop Adhi
2016	Oru Mugathirai	"Naan Enbadhu (Female)"	Premkumar Sivaperuman	Solo
2016	Chennai 600028: Second Innings	"Idhu Kadhaiya"	Yuvan Shankar Raja	Sean Roldan
2016	Kaththi Sandai	"Idhayam Idhayam"	Hiphop Tamizha	Hiphop Adhi
2016	Koditta Idangalai Nirappuga	"Na Re Na"	C. Sathya	Solo
2017	Meesaya Murukku	"Meesaya Murukku"	Hiphop Tamizha	Hiphop Adhi
2019	Party	"Cha Cha Charey"	Premji Amaren	Suriya, Karthi, Venkat Prabhu, Premgi Amaren
2019	Jasmine	"Maalai Saatrinaal"	C. Sathya	Solo
2019	Jasmine	"Wake Up Song	C. Sathya	Solo
2019	Zombie	"Are You Okay Baby"	Premji Amaren	Anthony Daasan, Pravin Saivi, Premji Amaren, Swagatha S. Krishnan
2019	Kaappaan	"Machan Inga Vandhira"	Harris Jayaraj	Nikhita Gandhi, Shabnam
2020	Don't Come Back (Single - English)	"Don't Come Back"	Bliss Ü	Solo
2020	Maranthitiyo (Single)	"Maranthitiyo"	Mad Panda	Solo
2020	Moved On (Single - English)	"Moved On"	Kharesma Ravichandran	Solo
2020	Dear Future (Single - English)	"Dear Future"	Kharesma Ravichandran	Solo
2023	Pichaikkaran 2	"Nana Buluku"	Vijay Antony	Solo
2023	Iraivan	"Azhagai"	Yuvan Shankar Raja	Sanjith Hegde
2024	Aranmanai 4	"Achacho"	Hiphop Tamizha	Hiphop Adhi, Srinisha Jayaseelan
2024	Pon Ondru Kanden	"Sundari"	Yuvan Shankar Raja	Sathyaprakash, Jithin Raj
2024	Kadaisi Ulaga Por	"Suthanthira Swasam"	Hiphop Tamizha	Hiphop Tamizha, Kaushik Krish
2025	Land of Spice (Single)	"Land of Spice"	Hiphop Tamizha	Solo

Television

- Nandhini - Sun TV
- Theme song for a Nepali TV show called PS Zindagi

== Awards and nominations ==
Year	Award	Category	Work	Result	Ref.
2016	Edison Awards	Best Female Playback Singer	"Kadhal Cricket" from the film Thani Oruvan	Nominated	
2016	Filmfare Awards South	Best Female Playback Singer – Tamil	"Kadhal Cricket" from the film Thani Oruvan	Nominated	
2016	Mirchi Music Awards South	Upcoming Female Vocalist of the year	"Kadhal Cricket" from the film Thani Oruvan	Won	
2016	South Indian International Movie Awards	Best Female Playback Singer – Tamil	"Kadhal Cricket" from the film Thani Oruvan	Nominated	
