= Natpe Thunai (soundtrack) =

- Soundtrack album cover

Soundtrack album by Hiphop Tamizha
- Released: 3 April 2019
- Recorded: 2018–2019
- Genre: Single
- Length: 27:43
- Language: Tamil
- Label: Think Music
- Producer: Hiphop Tamizha

Hiphop Tamizha chronology
Vantha Rajavathaan Varuven (2018)	Natpe Thunai (2019)	Mr. Local (2019)

Natpe Thunai is the soundtrack album for the 2019 Indian Tamil-language film of the same name. The soundtrack album was composed by Hiphop Tamizha with lyrics written by Hiphop Tamizha, Arivu, Sollisai Selvandhar and Dr. Vadugam Sivakumar. All the songs in the film were released as singles. The soundtrack album which features, all the songs were released on 3 April 2019. The songs "Madham Madham" and "Keezh Veezhndhal Meendezhuvom" were not featured in the film's soundtrack album, despite being featured in the end credits of the film.

== Songs ==
Kerala Song

The first song from the film, titled "Kerala Song" was released on 14 December 2018. The song was penned and rendered by Hiphop Tamizha himself. The highlight of the song is the hiphop-koothu-chenda fusion, and the fun-filled lyrics included in the film. The lyrical video was released on the same day, which features the #NatpeThunaiChallenge that was fun because of it. Prior to song release, the challenge asked people to send videos of themselves dancing to a part of the "Kerala Song". In the final video we see some nice bits of old and young people dancing between the lyric portions.

Single Pasanga

This song was released on 25 January 2019. It has turned out to be an instant sensation on YouTube, social media and all music platforms. The song has simple lyrics that can be easily grasped and of course, the music which has the trademark style of Hip Hop Tamizha. This song had lyrics written by Arivu, with vocals by Ka Ka Balachander, Gana Ulagam Dharani and Arivu.

Aathadi

This song is the remixed version, of the song of the same name from the film Sindhu Nathi Poo (1994). For the song sequence, the team shot at a beachside on East Coast Road, Chennai where Hip Hop Adhi shaking a leg for song, along with Shah Ra and Bijili Ramesh. The dance sequence featured around 100 foreign artistes, with the lead and other supporting actors many of them dressed in colourful costumes. Actor Adhi, who composed the song, apart from shooting the dance sequence stated that "Friendship is one of the pivotal themes of this film and this song’s lyrics are also about that. This intro song is more or less a celebration of youth." This song was released on 14 February 2019, which is considered to be Valentine's Day.

Pallikoodam - The Farewell Song

"The Farewell Song" was released on 8 March 2019, with lyrics written by Hiphop Tamizha and sung by Sanjith Hegde. This song brings the golden memories of friendship that lasted from school to college.

Morattu Single

This song which was released on 21 March 2019, was rendered by Hiphop Tamizha and D. Sathyaprakash. This song has a hiphop-romantic theme genre.

== Track listing ==
All lyrics are written by Hiphop Tamizha, except where noted.

Track listing
No.	Title	Lyrics	Singer(s)	Length
1.	"Kerala Song"	Hiphop Tamizha	Hiphop Tamizha	3:57
2.	"Single Pasanga"	Arivu	Ka Ka Balachander, Gana Ulagam Dharani, Arivu	3:44
3.	"Aathadi"	Hiphop Tamizha	Hiphop Tamizha, V. M. Mahalingam	3:27
4.	"Pallikoodam - The Farewell Song"	Hiphop Tamizha	Sanjith Hegde	3:04
5.	"Veedhikor Jaadhi"	Hiphop Tamizha, Arivu, Sollisai Selvandhar	Hiphop Tamizha, Arivu, Sollisai Selvandhar, Sanjith Hegde	2:41
6.	"Morattu Single"	Hiphop Tamizha	Sathyaprakash, Hiphop Tamizha	3:06
7.	"Vengamavan"	Hiphop Tamizha	Hiphop Tamizha, Chinna Ponnu	3:37
8.	"Natpe Thunai - Title Track"	Dr. Vadugam Sivakumar	Sanjith Hegde, Kaushik Krish	3:54
9.	"Madham Madham"	Hiphop Tamizha	Hiphop Tamizha	4:20
10.	"Keezh Veezhndhal"		Hiphop Tamizha
Total length:				32:03
