= A1 Express =

Indian Telugu-language sports comedy film

- Theatrical release poster
- Directed by: Dennis Jeevan Kanukolanu
- Written by: Sreekanth; Devesh Jeyachandran
- Based on: Natpe Thunai
- Produced by: T. G. Vishwa Prasad; Abhishek Agarwal; Sundeep Kishan; Daya Pannen
- Starring: Sundeep Kishan; Lavanya Tripathi; Rao Ramesh; Murli Sharma
- Cinematography: Kavin Raj
- Edited by: Chota K. Prasad
- Music by: Hiphop Tamizha
- Production companies: People Media Factory; Abhishek Agarwal Arts; Venkatadri Talkies
- Release date: 5 March 2021
- Running time: 138 minutes
- Country: India
- Language: Telugu
- Box office: est. ₹5 crore

A1 Express is a 2021 Indian Telugu-language sports drama film directed by Dennis Jeevan Kanukolanu. It stars Sundeep Kishan and Lavanya Tripathi while Murali Sharma and Rao Ramesh appear in supporting roles. A remake of the Tamil film Natpe Thunai (2019), the film focuses on corruption and nepotism in sports. It was released on 5 March 2021.

== Plot ==
Sundeep (Sanju) Naidu is a happy-go-lucky youngster in Yanam whose only ambition is to move to France. He goes to Yanam for this purpose, but there, he ends up falling in love with Lavanya Rao, a hockey player. Lavanya learns hockey through her hockey coach, Murali, a kindhearted retired military man who is the coach of the Indian local hockey team.

A corporate is after the ground where the Murali's players practice, and they are aided by the Sports minister Rao Ramesh. Later by filing a RTI about the company, Murali discovers the corporation's plan to build a factory in the ground which pollutes the nearby rivers and harmful for the nearby villagers living there. Now to save the ground from the corporate the Murali's students should play with the Vizag hockey team and win the match. While selecting the hockey players for his team, he learns that Sanju was the 2014 U-21 World Cup Indian hockey team captain who was banned for three years. When Murali asks Sanju to join their hockey team and help them win the match, he refuses and narrates his past and his reasons for leaving hockey.

Sanju, Darshi, and Rahul were childhood friends. Sanju is an attacker in his team, while Darshi is defense in the same team. Sanju, after being selected by national selectors, gets into the Indian hockey team and later becomes the captain of the 2014 U-21 World Cup competition's Indian hockey team, but Darshi is rejected in the Indian hockey team and asks about this to his coach, who mocks his desire to play hockey as well as his financial status and instead tells him to help his father in his fishing business. Because of this, Darshi kills himself in grief, and Rahul loses his leg to an oncoming train when he tries to save him. When Sanju learns of this, he thrashes his coach, and is therefore banned for five years.

Later, Murali decides to protest against the corporate company's unit being set up there with the help of his students and the local people, but the minister uses his dirty tricks and prevents Murali from becoming successful in his protest. The sports minister later acquaints with Sanju former coach to thwart Sanju's team from winning the hockey tournament.

After seeing the local people of India players of hockey suffering, Sanju decides to join the hockey team and get back the ground. Murali and Sanju train the players, and later, after facing so many difficulties, they win the match and get their ground back. When they come back to the ground, they see Rao Ramesh (who has lost his position now) giving a speech to the press as feeling happy for Murali's team's victory.

== Cast ==
- Sundeep Kishan as Sundeep "Sanju" Naidu
- Lavanya Tripathi as Lavanya Rao (voice dubbed by Chinmayi)
- Murali Sharma as Coach Murali
- Rao Ramesh as Sports minister Rao Ramesh
- Posani Krishna Murali as Sundeep's uncle
- Priyadarshi Pulikonda as Darshi
- Rahul Ramakrishna as Rahul
- Satish Saripalli as Lavanya's father
- Abhijeeth Poondla as Asif Ali, Vice captain
- Raghu Babu as Raghu, Govt Officer
- Sriranjani as Sundeep's mother
- Satya as Satya, Sundeep's cousin
- Sudharshan as Rao Ramesh's assistant
- Uppada Parvateesam
- Mahesh Vitta as Mahesh, Divya's classmate
- Divi Vadthya as Divya, Satya's sister
- Khayyum as Khayyum, Ground Incharge
- Bhupal Raju as a school coach
- Kathi Mahesh as a journalist

== Production ==
=== Development ===
After his first production venture, Ninu Veedani Needanu Nene became a decent success, Sundeep Kishan officially announced his second project under his Venkatadri Talkies banner, titled as A1 Express and it was reported to be helmed by newcomer Dennis Jeevan Kanukolanu. The project was officially announced in October 2019 with a poster release denoting it as the first Telugu-language sports film to be based on hockey.

=== Casting ===
Sundeep also played the lead role apart from producing the film, and actors Priyadarshi, Rahul Ramakrishna, Murali Sharma and Srinivas Avasarala were signed, although the details of the lead actress were not announced. The actors undergone a month-long training at the Begumpet Hockey Stadium in Hyderabad so as to understand the nuances of the sport, and the film went on floors from November 2019. With the shooting being progressed silently in Hyderabad, the makers announced the lead actress of the film as Lavanya Tripathi with her character poster being released from the film in December 2019. Tripathi trained intensively in hockey before her portions were shot earlier a month ago.

=== Filming ===
The film's shooting which was halted due to the COVID-19 pandemic, was resumed in September 2020, during the fourth phase of unlock. The major of the portions were shot in Hyderabad with a special team being designated in order to observe the cast and crew abiding the safety guidelines in order to control the spread of COVID-19. The post-lockdown schedule was completed within a duration of 15 days and the team took a month-long break due to restrictions in travel after pandemic lockdown, as the team had to start the final schedule in Mohali. Later, the final schedule took place in October 2020 with the portions being shot at the Mohali International Hockey Stadium, where the crucial sequences of the 2007 film Chak De! India were filmed. The shooting of the film was wrapped in December 2020.

== Soundtrack ==
A1 Express

Soundtrack album by Hiphop Tamizha
- Released: 3 March 2021
- Recorded: 2020
- Genre: Feature film soundtrack
- Length: 26:49
- Language: Telugu
- Label: Think Music
- Producer: Hiphop Tamizha

Hiphop Tamizha chronology
Naan Sirithal (2020)	A1 Express (2021)	Sivakumarin Sabadham (2021)

Singles from A1 Express
- 1. "Single Kingulam" Released: 12 February 2020; 2. "Amigo" Released: 10 February 2021; 3. "Veedhikoka Jaathi" Released: 25 February 2021; 4. "Telavaarutunte" Released: 1 March 2021

The music is composed by Hiphop Tamizha, in his third Telugu film after Dhruva and Krishnarjuna Yudham. Hiphop Tamizha reused most of the compositions from the 2019 Tamil film Natpe Thunai except for one track: "Amigo". The album has eight songs that features lyrics written by Ramajogayya Sastry, Kittu Vissapragada, Samrat, Roll Rida, Krishna Chaitanya, Pranav Chaganty, Vamsi Vikas. The first song titled "Single Kingulam" was released on 12 February 2020, which was sung by Rahul Sipligunj. It is the re-composed version of the 2019 Tamil song "Single Pasanga". The song earned 6 million views on YouTube as of July 2020 and became one of the popular Telugu songs of the year on major music streaming platforms.

A year later, another song "Amigo" sung by Inno Genga was released on 10 February 2021, as the film's second single. Later, the third song "Veedhikoka Jaathi" sung by Roll Rida and Yogi Sekar, with rap versions penned by the former was released on 25 February. The fourth song "Telavaarutunte" was released on 1 March 2021, and the rest of the tracks were released along with the complete album on 3 March 2021.

Track listing
No.	Title	Lyrics	Singer(s)	Length
1.	"Single Kingulam"	Samrat	Rahul Sipligunj	3:44
2.	"Amigo"	Ramajogayya Sastry	Inno Genga	3:08
3.	"Veedhikoka Jaathi"	Ramajogayya Sastry, Roll Rida	Roll Rida, Yogi Sekar	2:26
4.	"Telavaarutunte"	Kittu Vissapragada	Suswaram Anirudh	3:06
5.	"Seatu Siragadha"	Vamsi Vikas	Mangli, Pranav Chaganty	3:34
6.	"Puttibhoomi"	Ramajogayya Sastry	Kaala Bhairava	3:03
7.	"Poratamey"	Krishna Chaitanya	Sanjith Hegde	3:39
8.	"Charitraney Likhinchara"	Kittu Vissapragada	Vedala Hemachandra	4:09
Total length:				26:49

== Reception ==
=== Critical reception ===
Neeshita Nyayapati of The Times of India stated that "A1 Express might be a predictable, often-told tale, but it is a much-needed one. Even if just to show that there is hope for the youth of this country after all, seeing as how they’re not afraid to fight back." Film Companion's Karthik Keramalu wrote that "It's entertaining in its own mundane way, but when there are so many competent actors in a movie, you wish it had aimed higher. That’s all!"

Gabbeta Ranjith Kumar of The Indian Express quoted the film as "lost opportunity" Another critic Sasidhar Divi rated the film 2.5 out of 5 and stated "A1 Express may not be a perfect sports film, but it has its moments." Sangeetha Devi Dundoo of The Hindu wrote that "A1 Express is a mixed bag; a part of it wants to be taken as a serious sports drama and another part wants you to just have some popcorn entertainment. A little more focus would have made it a more engaging sports drama." A reviewer of The Hans India stated "On paper, A1 Express has a simple storyline. But the hockey angle makes things interesting in the movie. A1 Express is a good watch even though it has a few drawbacks."

=== Box office ===
The film grossed over ₹1.5 crore on its opening day. In its opening weekend, the film grossed over ₹5 crore.
