= Meesaya Murukku 2 =

2026 film directed by Hiphop Tamizha

- Theatrical release poster
- Directed by: Hiphop Tamizha
- Written by: Hiphop Tamizha
- Dialogues by: Hiphop Tamizha; Karan Karky; Nithish D
- Produced by: Khushbu Sundar; Sundar C; A. C. Shanmugam; A. C. S. Arun Kumar
- Starring: Hiphop Tamizha; Ketika Sharma; Chaithra J Achar; Ramya Ranganathan
- Cinematography: Balaji Subramanyam
- Edited by: Fenny Oliver; R. Thirumalai Rajan
- Music by: Hiphop Tamizha
- Production companies: Avni Movies; Benzz Media (P) Ltd.
- Distributed by: Five Star K. Senthil; Bright Screen; Dream Big Films
- Release date: 25 September 2026
- Running time: 140 minutes
- Country: India
- Language: Tamil
- Box office: est. ₹43.21 crore

Meesaya Murukku 2 is an 2026 Indian Tamil-language musical comedy drama film directed by Adhi of Hiphop Tamizha and produced by Avni Movies and Benzz Media (P) Ltd. It is a spiritual successor to Meesaya Murukku (2017). The film stars Adhi, Ketika Sharma (in her Tamil debut), Chaithra J Achar, and Ramya Ranganathan in lead roles. It spans three generations of musicians whose dreams are closely tied to their native sound.

The film was officially announced in January 2026, though principal photography had already commenced in August 2025 in secrecy and ended in mid-2026. The film has music composed by Hiphop Tamizha, with cinematography by Balaji Subramanyam and editing by Fenny Oliver and R. Thirumalai Rajan.

Meesaya Murukku 2 was released theatrically on 25 September 2026. The film received mixed reviews from critics and has grossed over ₹43.21 crore worldwide.

== Plot ==
Jeeva, a talented but playful young Gaana singer, dreams of taking his street-rooted music beyond the local neighbourhood and gaining mainstream global recognition. His family has a deep history with music, but his ambition clashes directly with systemic barriers. While earlier generations of his family had their own grand musical dreams thwarted by different forces—namely the rigid societal system affecting his grandfather and life's harsh realities affecting his father—Jeeva's biggest battle is often with himself and his own flaws. The film tracks the journey of how independent music transitions through time, from historical setups in Madras to the modern era, showing Jeeva fighting to preserve his unique sound while breaking the cycle of failure. Supported by his loyal best friend Harshath and the pillars of strength provided by the female characters, Jeeva strives to finally give Gaana music the global platform it deserves.

== Cast ==
- Hiphop Tamizha Adhi in four roles as:
  - DJ Jeeva
    - Dharshan Kannan as Junior Jeeva
  - Tiger Siva
  - Gaana Das
  - Himself (cameo appearance from Meesaya Murukku)
- Ketika Sharma as Laila Singh (Voice dubbed by RJ Reethu)
- Chaithra J Achar as Lakshmi
- Ramya Ranganathan as Vaani
- Baba Bhaskar as Older Tiger Siva / Driver Siva
- Karunas as Older Gaana Das
- Vidhya Borgia as Older Lakshmi
- Harshath Khan as Harshath
- S. Manikandan (Kettavan Gang) as Siva's friend
- Rocket Rajesh as Siva's friend
- Mukesh as Siva's friend
- Vasanth as Siva's friend
- Yogi Babu as Babu
- Vijay Varadharaj as Srini
- Sabharish Ramachandran as Sanjay
- Sadhanusha as Mithra
- Nassar as Seshadri
- Sharmila Thapa as Jeeva's friend
- Aadukalam Naren as Masilamani
- Karunakaran as Venkatesan
- Bjorn Surrao as Michael
- Shah Ra as Manager M. Balaji M. Tech.
- Vinoth Kumar as Sudhakar Anna
- Bagavathi Perumal as Gopi
- Munishkanth as Sundaram
- Gana Vinoth
- Terance Patrick Evers as Music Director
- Aswin Raam as Director
- Badava Gopi as Paartha
- Aroul D. Shankar as Music Director Bharath Kumar
- Java Sundaresan as Hotel Manager
- VJ Nikki as DJ Jolly

Cameo appearances

- Vivek as Ramachandran (archival footage from Meesaya Murukku)
- Sundar C as himself

== Production ==
Following the success of Meesaya Murukku (2017), filmmaker and musician Adhi of Hiphop Tamizha announced a sequel to the film in January 2026. The announcement was made during his live concert in Malaysia, where he confirmed that Meesaya Murukku 2 was officially in development. Adhi also revealed that the film would continue the fact-based narrative of the original film and that he would return as the director, lead actor, and music composer. Filming, however, had already begun in secrecy in August 2025. By mid-July 2026, filming was in the final stages with only two days of filming left.

== Music ==
Meesaya Murukku 2

Soundtrack album by Hiphop Tamizha
- Released: 4 March 2026
- Recorded: 2025–2026
- Genre: Feature film soundtrack
- Length: TBA
- Language: Tamil
- Label: Saregama
- Producer: Hiphop Tamizha

Hiphop Tamizha chronology
Kadaisi Ulaga Por (2024)	Meesaya Murukku 2 (2026)	Aalambana (TBA)

Singles from Meesaya Murukku 2
- 1. "Aura 10/10" Released: 4 March 2026; 2. "Pappali Pazhamey" Released: 8 April 2026; 3. "Goindhamma" Released: 21 May 2026; 4. "Adi Podi" Released: 24 June 2026; 5. "Kalaivaniye" Released: 28 August 2026; 6. "Poda Padichiruken" Released: 19 September 2026; 7. "Vibe Venuma" Released: 23 September 2026; 8. "Lojak Mojak" Released: 1 October 2026 (After the film's release); 9. "Tiger Siva" Released: 6 October 2026 (After the film's release)

The soundtrack and background score are composed by Hiphop Tamizha. The audio rights were acquired by Saregama. The first single titled "Aura 10/10" was released on 4 March 2026. The second single titled "Pappali Pazhamey" was released on 8 April 2026. The third single titled "Goindhamma" was released on 21 May 2026. The fourth single titled "Adi Podi" was released on 24 June 2026. The fifth single titled "Kalaivaniye" was released on 28 August 2026. The sixth single titled "Poda Padichiruken" was released on 19 September 2026. The seventh single titled "Vibe Venuma" was released on 23 September 2026. The eighth single titled "Lojak Mojak" was released on 1 October 2026, after the film's release. The ninth single titled "Tiger Siva" was release on 6 October 2026, after the film's release.

Track listing
No.	Title	Lyrics	Singer(s)	Length
1.	"Aura 10/10"	Thamizh Aadhavan; Hiphop Tamizha	Hiphop Tamizha	2:09
2.	"Pappali Pazhamey"	K. R. Dharan	Hiphop Tamizha; Gana Vinoth; Gana Ulagam Dharani	3:27
3.	"Goindhamma"	Hiphop Tamizha	Hiphop Tamizha; Kaushik Krish; Gana Vinoth; Gana Ulagam Dharani; Gana Sudhakar	3:19
4.	"Adi Podi"	Hiphop Tamizha	Hiphop Tamizha	2:42
5.	"Kalaivaniye"	Hiphop Tamizha	Hiphop Tamizha; Sathya Prakash; Kaushik Krish	3:20
6.	"Poda Padichiruken"	Hiphop Tamizha	Hiphop Tamizha; Gana Bala; V. M. Mahalingam	3:11
7.	"Vibe Venuma"	Hiphop Tamizha; Kaushik Krish	Hiphop Tamizha; V. M. Mahalingam; Kaushik Krish; VJ Siddu	2:47
8.	"Lojak Mojak"	Hiphop Tamizha	Hiphop Tamizha; Harshath Khan; Kaushik Krish	2:22
9.	"Tiger Siva"	Hiphop Tamizha	Hiphop Tamizha	2:17
Total length:				25:33

== Release ==
=== Theatrical ===
Meesaya Murukku 2 was released in theatres on 25 September 2026. In late August, the Tamil Film Producers Council (TFPC) and the Tamil Film Active Producers Association (TFAPA), due to a dispute with film distributors and exhibitors, announced that Tamil films cannot release or complete filming or post-production works from 1 September 2026 onwards, the film's theatrical release was facing uncertainty. However, a week later, the decision was reversed, allowing the film to release as planned.

=== Marketing ===
A promotional event that was scheduled to be held on 8 August at Phoenix Marketcity was cancelled the same day due to overcrowding at the mall.

=== Home media ===
The post-theatrical satellite and streaming rights have been acquired by Sony Vizha and SonyLIV respectively. It is scheduled to begin streaming on SonyLIV from 6 November 2026.

== Reception ==
Meesaya Murukku 2 received mixed reviews from critics. M. Suganth of The Times of India gave 3/5 stars and wrote, "The film's biggest strength is that it knows exactly what its target audience — youngsters — wants and delivers exactly that: a fun theatrical experience with enough highs to leave them satisfied as they exit the theatre." Srinivasa Ramanujam of The Hindu wrote, "Hiphop Tamizha Adhi's gaana-driven underdog tale struggles to find rhythm". Akshay Kumar of Cinema Express gave 2.5/5 stars and wrote, "Meesaya Murukku 2 deserves plaudits for pointing out how the independent scene is becoming increasingly corporatised, but it forces this conflict into a simplistic hero-villain template".

Manivasagan Namasivayam of DT Next wrote, "The constant explaining, uneven humour, insensitive LGBTQ+ sequence and sluggish second half dilute what could have been a sharper film about talent, access and the changing music industry". Janani K of India Today wrote, "The film has the right instincts, yet its flat writing, late-arriving conflict and heavy dependence on speeches keep it from landing the impact it clearly intends to. For a film about an art form fighting for its place in the mainstream, Meesaya Murukku 2 ironically struggles to find its own voice".
