= Naan Sirithal =

2020 Indian film by Raana

- Theatrical release poster
- Directed by: Raana
- Written by: Raana
- Based on: Keka Beka Keka Beka
- Produced by: Sundar C
- Starring: Hiphop Tamizha; Iswarya Menon; K. S. Ravikumar
- Narrated by: Raana
- Cinematography: Vanchinathan Murugesan
- Edited by: Sreejith Sarang
- Music by: Hiphop Tamizha
- Production company: Avni Movies
- Distributed by: Rock Fort Entertainment
- Release date: 14 February 2020
- Running time: 137 minutes
- Country: India
- Language: Tamil

Naan Sirithal (transl. When I laugh) is a 2020 Indian Tamil-language comedy film written and directed by Raana in his directorial debut. Following the success of Meesaya Murukku and Natpe Thunai, Sundar C co-produced Adhi's third film and it became a hat-trick hit. Hiphop Tamizha and Iswarya Menon and K. S. Ravikumar is playing a villain role, while Badava Gopi and Eruma Saani Vijay are playing supporting roles. It is a feature film version of Raana's own short film Keka Beka Keka Beka. The film released on 14 February 2020 to mixed reviews.

== Plot ==
The film opens with an interview given by Thyagu, Gopi and Gandhi. Gandhi then starts to tell the story of his life. He is a happy go lucky man who works in the IT sector. He is in love with his office colleague Ankitha. Due to unfortunate circumstances at his workplace, he is told to clear his failed exams in Engineering, or else he would lose his job. Ankitha also pressurizes him to study well and pass the exam, yet he is unable to study properly and enters the exam hall. Seeing the question paper and getting insulted by his friend and an examiner which contains out of syllabus questions, all the stress from various parts of his life gets accumulated and Gandhi starts to laugh uncontrollably in the exam hall. This is when his laughing problem begins. This condition is called as 'Pseudobulbar affect', for which he faces trouble in various places and even Ankitha breaks up with him, so he consults a psychiatrist, Veerabadhran. He is not allowed to tell about this to anyone as he has tied a sacred talisman which will help him solve his problems. Meanwhile, Gandhi's close friend Dilli Babu is heartbroken because his girlfriend, Priya is marrying someone else and tells them that he plans to commit suicide. So Gandhi and his friends go in search of him.

Meanwhile, there is also a dreaded gangster in the town, also named Dilli Babu who has Minister Thangadurai's secret hard drive for safekeeping. Sakaradas is Dilli Babu's arch-nemesis. Hence, he sends his henchmen Nelson and Manikkam to kill Dilli Babu on his birthday party and steal the hard drive. Gandhi and his friends book Ola Cabs to file a missing-person complaint on their friend Dilli Babu; Nelson and Manikkam also arrange for a car to go to the gangster Dilli Babu's birthday party. In a sheer twist of coincidence, both the cars are at the same pick-up location, in the same colour with the same OTP code. Gandhi and his friends get in the wrong car to Dilli Babu's birthday party. Nelson and Manikkam end up in the police station with all their weapons causing suspicion.

Dilli Babu is aware of Sakaradas's plan of killing him and assumes Gandhi and his friends to be the henchmen sent by Sakaradas. Things spiral out of control when Dilli Babu starts beating Gandhi up and prepares to kill him. Suddenly, in fear and pain, Gandhi starts laughing uncontrollably, even after Dilli Babu beats him black and blue. Dilli Babu is enraged at this and all the henchmen mock at his inability to control an ordinary looking guy like Gandhi. Soon, the policemen arrive and arrest Dilli Babu and he vows to teach Gandhi a lesson.

Sakaradas is grateful to Gandhi for his displays of bravado right on his rival's face aiding in his arrest and supports & protects him. He also unwittingly reunites Gandhi with Ankitha and her parents agree for their wedding. Meanwhile, Gandhi and his friends try to find the missing friend Dilli Babu and eventually get to know that he is trying to commit suicide at the venue of his girlfriend's wedding. They rush to the venue and hilarious events ensue as the gangster Dilli Babu also arrives there with his men to kill Gandhi and Sakaradas who has been helping him. Finally, Gandhi is able to save his friend from committing suicide and the gangster Dilli Babu also realizes that Gandhi is not actually brave but only has a disorder that makes him laugh at the most inconvenient of situations. He lets Gandhi go and also hands over the hard drive containing the secrets to Gandhi hoping he will make a change in the society. Back in the present, Gandhi explains to the interviewer that he overcame his problems by putting on a mask and pretending to be fine amidst all the problems, indirectly citing that this is actually how people all over the world are leading their lives.

== Cast ==
- Hiphop Tamizha as Gandhi, a man who suffers from nervous laughter disorder
- Iswarya Menon as Ankitha Suresh
- K. S. Ravikumar as Gangster Dilli Babu
- Ravi Mariya as Sakaradas
- Shah Ra as Nelson
- Ramdoss as Manikkam
- Pandiarajan as Psychiatrist Veerabadhran
- Badava Gopi as Gopi, Gandhi's father
- Sujatha Sivakumar as Gandhi's mother
- Yogi Babu as Dilli Babu, Gandhi's friend
- G. Marimuthu as Minister Thangadurai
- "Eruma Saani" Vijay as Thyagu, Gandhi's friend
- Vichu Viswanath as Anbu
- D. R. K. Kiran as Perumal
- "Put Chutney" Rajmohan as Manoj, Gandhi's workmate and Julie's brother
- Lallu as Rohith, Gandhi's college friend
- Maria Juliana as Priya, Dilli Babu's ex-lover and Manoj's sister
- Archana as Anchor
- Rekha Suresh as Ankitha's mother
- Aroul D. Shankar as Ankitha's father
- Munnar Ramesh as Ravi
- Pudhupettai Suresh as Collection Sekar
- Sathya Kumaran as Gandhi's henchman
- Kishore Rajkumar as Dilli Babu's henchman
- VJ Aashiq as Julie's ex-boyfriend
- Deepakraj Gunasekaran as Ola Cab driver
- Thalapathy Dinesh as Paulraj
- Lollu Sabha Easter as Gandhi's neighbour
- Satheesh (Sreenivasan) as Examiner
- Gowthami Vembunathan as Neighbour

== Production ==
Principal photography began in July 2019, and lasted until 4 December 2019. Hiphop Tamizha Adhi and Sundar C joined for the third time.

== Soundtrack ==
Naan Sirithal

Soundtrack album by Hiphop Tamizha
- Released: 26 December 2019
- Genre: Single
- Language: Tamil
- Label: Think Music
- Producer: Hiphop Tamizha

Hiphop Tamizha chronology
Action (2019)	Naan Sirithal (2020)	A1 Express (2020)

The background score and soundtrack was composed by Hiphop Tamizha, with lyrics written by Hiphop Tamizha, Kabilan Vairamuthu and Arivu. The first single of the film, "Break Up Song" was released on 7 December 2019. The second single track "Dhom Dhom" was released on 21 December 2019. The third single track "Ajukku Gumukku" was released on 11 January 2020. The fourth single "Happy Birthday" was released on 25 January 2020.

Tracklist
No.	Title	Lyrics	Singer(s)	Length
1.	"BreakUp Song"	Hiphop Tamizha	Hiphop Tamizha	2:49
2.	"Dhom Dhom"	Hiphop Tamizha	Hiphop Tamizha, Sanjith Hegde	3:01
3.	"Ajukku Gumukku"	Kabilan Vairamuthu	Hiphop Tamizha	3:25
4.	"Happy Birthday"	Hiphop Tamizha, Arivu	Diwakar, Ka Ka Balachander	3:06
5.	"Keka Beka"	Hiphop Tamizha	Hiphop Tamizha, Rajan Chelliah	3:14
6.	"Naan Siricha"	Hiphop Tamizha	Kaushik Krish, Gana Vinoth	1:51
Total length:				17:26

== Release ==
The film was released on 14 February 2020.

== Critical reception ==
The Times of India rated 2.5 out of 5 stars stating "Most of the comedy scenes fall flat and you don't get enough reasons to empathise with the protagonist's condition". Sify rated 3 out of 5 stars stating "Naan Sirithal might appeal to youth audiences seeking time-pass entertainment". The Hindu stated "In the hands of a wise head, this script held the potential to be developed into an epic, Ray Cooney style, comedy-of-errors." Firstpost rated 2.5 out of 5 stars stating "On the whole, it is just a passable Aadhi film, which could have been better. The entertainment elements are there but there is a lack of a cohesive story to package them". The New Indian Express stated "If someone needed a primer on all things 'trending' in the past few years, then Naan Sirithal would be a good choice".
