= Tamizhi (web series) =

- Genre: Documentary; History
- Created by: Hiphop Tamizha
- Written by: Elango
- Screenplay by: Pradeep Kumar
- Directed by: Pradeep Kumar
- Theme music composer: Hiphop Tamizha
- Composer: Hiphop Tamizha
- Country of origin: India
- Original language: Tamil
- No. of seasons: 1
- No. of episodes: 8

Production
- Producer: Hiphop Tamizha
- Editor: Sreejith Sarang
- Camera setup: Lokesh Ilayaa; Balaje Baskaran

Original release
- Network: YouTube
- Release: 2 October – 22 November 2019

Tamizhi is a 2019 Indian Tamil language documentary web series created, produced and composed by Hiphop Tamizha, in their digital debut. The eight-episode web series is directed by Pradeep Kumar and written by Elango, which is a research documentary series based on evolution of Tamil writing script. The first episode was aired on 2 October 2019, through the composer's official YouTube channel, and its finale was aired on 22 November 2019.

== Production ==
The making of the documentary web series was revealed by Hiphop Tamizha Adhi in around 2017 while he was busy with his upcoming Tamil film projects as composer including for Thamizhan Endru Sol, Vantha Rajavathaan Varuven, Imaikka Nodigal, Thani Oruvan 2 and Natpe Thunai. It was revealed that Hiphop Aadhi himself had research on ancient Tamil language for more than a year before coming across an idea to produce a documentary series. The official trailer of the web series was unveiled on 11 December 2018 on the eve of birth anniversary of late Tamil popular poet Subramania Bharati.

== Soundtrack ==
A promotional song for the web series was composed and written by Hiphop Tamizha, who also sung the along with Anthony Daasan. was released as a music video on 21 September 2019 on YouTube, and as a single in all streaming platforms on the same day.

Tracklist
| No. | Title | Lyrics | Singer(s) | Length |
|---|---|---|---|---|
| 1. | "Tamizhi" | Hiphop Tamizha | Anthony Daasan, Hiphop Tamizha | 4:55 |
| Total length: | | | | 4:55 |

== Episodes ==
| No. | Title | Directed by | Written by | Original release date |
|---|---|---|---|---|
| 1 | "Ashokan Brahmi" | Pradeep Kumar | Elango | 2 October 2019 |
| 2 | "Tamizhi a.k.a Tamizh Brahmi" | Pradeep Kumar | Elango | 11 October 2019 |
| 3 | "Comparative Study" | Pradeep Kumar | Elango | 18 October 2019 |
| 4 | "The Sangam Era" | Pradeep Kumar | Elango | 25 October 2019 |
| 5 | "Indus Valley Civilization" | Pradeep Kumar | Elango | 1 November 2019 |
| 6 | "Evolution of Tamizhi" | Pradeep Kumar | Elango | 8 November 2019 |
| 7 | "Script Reformations" | Pradeep Kumar | Elango | 15 November 2019 |
| 8 | "The Conclusion" | Pradeep Kumar | Elango | 22 November 2019 |

== See also ==
- Tamizhi
- Tamil inscriptions
