= Simply Kushboo =

- சிம்ப்ளி குஷ்பூ
- Genre: Talk show
- Presented by: Kushboo
- Country of origin: India
- Original language: Tamil
- No. of seasons: 1
- No. of episodes: 26

Production
- Production location: Chennai
- Camera setup: Multi-camera
- Running time: approx. 40-45 minutes per episode

Original release
- Network: Zee Tamil
- Release: 22 August 2015 – 20 February 2016

Simply Kushboo is an Indian Tamil-language talk show that aired on Zee Tamizh. The show was launched on 22 August 2015 and aired weekly on every Saturday 8:00PM IST. The show is hosted by Kushboo.

The show will take fans up, close and personal to their favourite celebrities as Kushboo chats with them on their journeys via personal quizzes, career maps, their favourites in film industry, some dark secrets, hidden talents and not to forget, impromptu tests of their acting and dancing skills.

== Guests included ==
- Epi 01: Jayam Ravi
- Epi 02: Kamal Haasan
- Epi 03: Karthi
- Epi 04: Arvind Swamy
- Epi 05: Sivakarthikeyan
- Epi 06: G. V. Prakash Kumar
- Epi 07 & 08: Silambarasan
- Epi 09: Andrea Jeremiah
- Epi 10: Sathish
- Epi 11: Vijay Sethupathi
- Epi 12: Siddharth
- Epi 13: Meena
- Epi 14: Shruti Haasan
- Epi 15: R. Parthiepan
- Epi 16: Vaibhav Reddy
- Epi 17: S.P. Balasubrahmanyam
- Epi 18: Hiphop Tamizha
- Epi 19: Hansika Motwani
- Epi 20: Ravichandran Ashwin
- Epi 21: Sundar C
- Epi 22: R. Madhavan
- Epi 23: Keerthy Suresh
- Epi 24: K.S. Ravikumar
- Epi 25: Nandita Swetha
- Epi 26: Prashanth
