= Veeran (film) =

2023 Indian film by ARK Saravan

- Release poster
- Directed by: ARK Saravan
- Written by: ARK Saravan
- Produced by: T. G. Thyagarajan; Sendhil Thyagarajan; Arjun Thyagarajan
- Starring: Hiphop Tamizha; Vinay Rai; Athira Raj
- Cinematography: Deepak D. Menon
- Edited by: Prasanna GK
- Music by: Hiphop Tamizha
- Production company: Sathya Jyothi Films
- Distributed by: Sakthi Film Factory
- Release date: 2 June 2023
- Running time: 156 minutes
- Country: India
- Language: Tamil

Veeran (transl. Warrior) is a 2023 Indian Tamil-language superhero film written and directed by ARK Saravan of Maragadha Naanayam fame and produced by Sathya Jyothi Films. The film stars Adhi of Hiphop Tamizha, Vinay Rai, and Athira Raj (in her Tamil debut), with Munishkanth, Kaali Venkat, R. Badree, and Sassi Selvaraj in supporting roles.

Veeran released on 2 June 2023 and opened to generally positive reviews from critics and audiences, with praise for the performances of the cast, action sequences, visual effects, soundtrack and background score, but some criticism for the screen time of the main antagonist.

== Plot ==
The village of Veeranor, in Coimbatore, has a temple for the deity Veeran despite the lack of belief by the people. A 15-year-old Kumaran is near the temple when he is struck by lightning, and experiences a brief coma. Kumaran is sent to Singapore to recover and finds that he has electrokinesis, superhuman strength, and temporary mind control. 14 years later, Kumaran returns and shows off his powers to his friends Sakkarai and Selvi, but also tells them about visions he had of Veeranor's destruction. They find that a member of the technology company JACL has been trying to warn the villagers that the laser cables that they installed at a cheap price is volatile and capable of destroying the village, but nobody takes him seriously, and the police are bribed by the company. JACL is led by the evil scientist Sarath, his brother Thruv, and politician Sharath, who are testing fatal experimental super serums, killing subjects. They are determined to install 36 kilometers of uninterrupted laser cable in Veeranor.

Kumaran brainwashes inspector Nallasamy to get the confidential files seized by the police who turned in the traitor from JACL, and uses the village cable operators to broadcast the nature of the project. Despite this, however, nobody believes that the cables are dangerous, so Kumaran and Sakkarai plot to invent Veeran's mythology. Kumaran impersonates Veeran, and they start spreading rumors to the village about his return. He also brainwashes the council leader to prevent him from signing the temple land off to JACL, as destroying it is a requirement to build the cables. He controls a goon of JACL to instill fear into the non-believers, but Kumaran reveals to his friends that his mind could make him unconscious if used too much, but that a bracelet given to him by Sakkarai's grandfather helps control his powers. He is temporarily hospitalized as a result but escapes in order to fight goons sent by JACL to destroy the temple, successfully fending him off with help from his horse Bruce Lee. This causes the entire village to worship Veeran and deny JACL their land.

Thruv visits the village in frustration hoping to antagonize the villagers, but Kumaran brainwashes him thrice into praising Veeran. A video of his praising goes viral on Facebook, but despite disbelief, Thruv and a few scientists entertain the idea that he was artificially controlled by an electric source. A scientist suggests to Thruv that they can find the source using an electromagnetic detection meter. The next day a group of JACL goons impersonate villagers and instigate a riot leading to murder, and the bribed Nallasamy arrests the villagers who support Veeran, including Kumaran and Sakkarai and his grandfather. Nallasamy beats them all to instigate rage, hoping to expose Veeran for Thruv. Enraged by Sakkarai's grandfather getting beaten, Kumaran summons Bruce Lee, who helps him fend off the police and the captives to escape. He also beats up and wipes the memories of the police and fries Thruv's brain, putting him in a coma. The next day, the village cable operator Thangarasu reveals he knows Veeran's identity and praises Kumaran as his disabled daughter Sumathi belief in him allows her.

An enraged Sarath kills Sharath for his failure to protect Thruv and successfully sets a trap, having his men disable Kumaran's powers. He abducts and tortures Thangarasu in order to draw Veeran into a trap, shooting him with a dart of the fatal serum, though it simply knocks him out. Due to this, Sarath experiments on him with the serum, but villagers Perusu and Narayana halt this, allowing Veeran to escape. Despite his condition, Veeran confronts Thruv, who is set on destroying the temple, but Thruv injures him and Bruce Lee. When the temple lingam is struck, divine lightning strikes Veeran, repowering him. He gets up and fights off the men, eventually killing Thruv. Elsewhere, Perusu and Narayana accidentally shoot Sarath with a serum dart, killing him. In the end, Veeran congratulates the villagers for their support and eventually finds that the lore he made up for Veeran is real, that the ancient warrior of his name is entombed under the village.

== Cast ==
- Hiphop Tamizha as Kumaran / Veeran
- Vinay Rai as Sarath
- Athira Raj as Selvi
- Munishkanth as Perusu
- Kaali Venkat as Narayana
- Nakkalites Sassi Selvaraj as Sakkarai (Chakravarthy)
- R. Badree as Dhruv
- Bose Venkat as Sharath
- Jeeva Ravi as Kumaran’s father
- Chinni Jayanth as Kalimuthu, Panchayat President
- Nakkalites Chella as Thangarasu, Cable TV Operator
- Nakkalites Prasanna Balachandran
- Nakkalites Savithri as Lakshmi
- Jenson Dhivakar as Kannaayiram, Tractor Driver
- Nisha as Sudha, Kumaran’s sister
- Appa Ravi
- Kannappadasan
- Kovai Babu as Vinayak Ramamurthy's assistant
- M. K. Rajan as Selvi's father
- Mr. GK as himself as Science Communicator (Cameo appearance)
- Eesan Sujatha (cameo appearance in the song "Veeran Thiruvizha")

== Production ==
In April 2018, V. Madhiazhagan of Etcetera Entertainment commissioned a film to be directed by ARK Saravan, who earlier directed Maragadha Naanayam (2017). Titled Minnal Veeran, the film was set to star Atharvaa and Parvati Nair in the lead roles, with D. Imman as the music composer and Deepak Menon as the cinematographer. During the pre-production stages of the film, while location scouting was ongoing, Madhiazhagan stepped in to financially assist Atharvaa on the release of his home production venture, Semma Botha Aagathey (2018). However, the failure of the film prompted a financial disagreement between Madhiazhagan and Atharvaa, and following mediation from the Tamil Film Producers Council, it was agreed that Atharvaa would work on Minnal Veeran to settle the losses of Semma Botha Aagathey. In a turn of events in November 2018, ARK Saravan refused to work on the film, citing that Atharvaa and Madhiazhagan's financial disputes had disrupted his interest in making the film In May 2019, ARK Saravan planned on making the film with Arya in the lead role for the production house Studio Green, but the project did not take off.

In 2022, the film was picked up by Sendhil Thyagarajan and Arjun Thyagarajan under the banner of Sathya Jyothi Films. The shooting of the film began on 25 May 2022. The cinematography of the film was done by Deepak D. Menon, and the editing of the film was done by Prasanna GK.

== Music ==
Veeran

Soundtrack album by Hiphop Tamizha
- Released: 27 May 2023
- Recorded: 2023
- Genre: Feature film soundtrack
- Length: 5:35
- Language: Tamil
- Label: Saregama Tamil
- Producer: Hiphop Tamizha

Hiphop Tamizha chronology
Agent (2023)	Veeran (2023)	Aranmanai 4 / Baak (2024)

The music for the film was composed by Hiphop Tamizha.

Track listing
No.	Title	Lyrics	Singer(s)	Length
1.	"Thunderkaaran"	Vivek	Anirudh Ravichander, Hiphop Tamizha	2:36
2.	"Papara Mitta"	Vignesh Srikanth	Vaisagh, Hiphop Tamizha	2:59
3.	"Veeran Thiruvizha"	Muthamil	Muthu Sirpi, Chinnaponnu, Pranavam Sasi, Hiphop Tamizha	3:41
4.	"Andome Kidukidunga"	Muthamil	Senthil Ganesh, Hiphop Tamizha	2:53
Total length:				12:09

== Release ==
The film was released on 2 June 2023.

=== International ===
Sri Lanka distribution rights were acquired by Kollywood Entertainment and Kurinchi Creations.

France distribution rights were acquired by Night ED Films.

=== Home media ===
The post-theatrical streaming rights of the film were bought by Amazon Prime Video. Zee Tamil bought the television rights.

== Reception ==
Veeran received generally positive reviews from critics.

Logesh Balachandran of The Times of India rated the film 3 out of 5 and wrote that "Overall, Veeran possesses enough strength to keep us engaged throughout the film". Swathi P Ajith of Onmanorama stated that "Veeran may not present a completely unique storyline or offer extraordinary elements". Thinkal Menon of OTT Play gave the film a rating of 3.5 out of 5 and wrote that "Veeran is an enjoyable ride for all sections of audience if you overlook a few glitches. A better making style would have elevated the movie to another level, though".

A critic from Maalai Malar gave the film a rating of 3.25 out of 5 and noted that "Director ARK Saravanan has impressed everyone with a superhero fantasy film. He has given an easy way for people to understand the social problem in the village".
