= Odavum Mudiyadhu Oliyavum Mudiyadhu =

2023 Indian film by Ramesh Venkat

- Theatrical release poster
- Directed by: Ramesh Venkat
- Written by: Kishore K Kumar
- Produced by: Rajan
- Starring: See Cast
- Cinematography: Joshua J Perez
- Edited by: Ganesh Siva
- Music by: Kaushik Krish
- Production company: Akshaya Pictures
- Distributed by: AP International
- Release date: 29 December 2023
- Running time: 105 minutes
- Country: India
- Language: Tamil

Odavum Mudiyadhu Oliyavum Mudiyadhu (transl. You Can't Run, You Can't Hide) is a 2023 Indian Tamil-language comedy horror film directed by Ramesh Venkat. The film was produced by Rajan under the banner of Akshaya Pictures.

== Plot ==
The storyline revolves around a diverse group of individuals who find themselves inexplicably trapped in a peculiar theatre. As they attempt to escape, they realize the theatre conceals mysterious secrets, and a paranormal presence looms over them. The group's journey to uncover the truth takes unexpected turns, leaving them questioning the very fabric of reality.

== Cast ==
- Munishkanth as Dharmaraj
- Riythvika as Geetha
- Sathyamurthi V.
- Jangiri Madhumitha as Kannagi
- Vijay Kumar Rajendran as Vijay
- Yashika Aannand
- VJ Ashiq
- Gopi as Gopi
- Sudhakar as Sudhakar
- Shah Ra as Gopi
- Abdool Lee as Abdool
- Harija as Harija
- George Maryan as Christopher Kannaiyan
- Crane Manohar as Drunkard
- Lollu Sabha Manohar
- Jaiseelan as Aravind
- Nandha Gopala Krishnan as Trump

== Production ==
The film's title is derived from the slogan of the first season of Bigg Boss Tamil. Principal photography began in December 2017, and the entire shooting was completed within 45 days.

== Reception ==
Times Now critic gave 3 star out of 5 and stated that "Overall, Odavum Mudiyadhu Oliyavum Mudiyadhu delivers a thrilling cinematic experience that will leave you questioning the unknown." Roopa Radhakrishnan of Times of india gave 3 star out of 5 and wrote that " it's a laugh-out-loud movie that does complete justice to both the horror and comedy portions." Malini Mannath wrote that " ‘Odavum Mudiyadhu….’ (121 minutes) is at its best a stepping stone for a debutant maker."
