= Shah Ra =

Indian actor and YouTuber (born 1986)

- Born: Shiva Saravanan; 4 November 1986 (age 39); Pattukkottai, Tamil Nadu, India
- Other names: Sha Ra, Shiva Shah Ra
- Occupations: Actor, YouTuber
- Years active: 2017-present
- Spouse: Selvi Shah (m. 2014)

Shah Ra is an Indian actor who has worked in Tamil films.

== Early life and career ==
Shah Ra did his schooling at Laurel High Secondary School, Pattukkottai. He completed his graduation with B. Sc., in Visual Communication from SRM Institute of Science and Technology. He worked as a Radio personality in Hello FM 106.4. He came to limelight after he started the YouTube Channels Temple Monkeys and Friday Facts. a Tamil-language YouTube channel, along with Vijay Varadharaj. He made his acting debut on the big screen with the film Maanagaram (2017). He is known for acting in Meesaya Murukku (2017) and Iruttu Araiyil Murattu Kuththu (2018).

== Filmography ==
Year	Film	Role(s)	Notes
2017	Maanagaram	Kidnapping Gang Member	
2017	Meesaya Murukku	M. Balaji M. Tech (Bijili)	
2018	Iruttu Araiyil Murattu Kuththu	Vasu	
2019	Natpe Thunai	Sridhar	
2019	Comali	Dr. D. Thiyagesh	
2019	Super Duper	Mama / Vikram	Dual role
2019	Action	Maya Kannan	
2021	Naan Sirithal	Nelson	
2021	Oh My Kadavule	Mani	credited as Shiva Shah Ra
2021	Dikkiloona	Karthik	
2022	Ranga	Adithya's friend	
2022	O2	Parvathy's Brother	
2022	Diary	Maasilamani	
2022	Varalaru Mukkiyam	Karthik's friend	
2023	Vaathi	Prakash Reddy	Simultaneously shot in Telugu as Sir
2023	Single Shankarum Smartphone Simranum	Madesh	
2023	Pallu Padama Paathukka	Gopi	
2023	Soppana Sundari	Maaran	
2023	Karungaapiyam	Jacob	
2023	Aneethi	Bhaskar	
2023	Odavum Mudiyadhu Oliyavum Mudiyadhu	Gopi	
2024	The Boys	Sundaram	credited as Shiva Sha Ra
2024	Double Tuckerr	Murder Mani	credited as Shiva Sha Ra
2024	Romeo	Leela's friend	
2024	Boat	Raja Mohammed "Raja"	
2024	Minmini	Warden	
2024	Kadaisi Ulaga Por	Rishikanth	
2024	Black	Suresh	
2025	Mr. Housekeeping	Raman "Roman"	
2025	Aghathiyaa	Shankar	
2025	Thanal	'Idea' Mani	
2026	Love Insurance Kompany	Jayanth	
2026	Meesaya Murukku 2	M. Balaji M Tech	

=== Streaming television ===
Year	Film	Role(s)	Platform	Ref.
2022	Kuthukku Pathu	Murugesan	Aha	
2023	Baba Paraak		YouTube	

Voice Artist

Year	Film	Actor	Role	Notes
2025	Dude	Satya	Rahul	
