= Naa Oru Alien =

Studio album by Hiphop Tamizha
- Released: 14 August 2020
- Recorded: 2020
- Genre: Hip hop
- Length: 23:03
- Language: Tamil
- Label: Think Music
- Producer: Hiphop Tamizha

Hiphop Tamizha chronology
Hip Hop Tamizhan (2012)	Naa Oru Alien (2020)

Singles from Naa Oru Alien
- 1. "Net ah Thorandha" Released: 6 August 2020

Naa Oru Alien (transl. I Am an Alien) is the second studio album of the Indian music duo Hiphop Tamizha, consisting of Adhi and Jeeva. The album was released on 14 August 2020.

== Overview ==
On 4 August 2020, the label Think Music made an announcement through Twitter, regarding Hiphop Tamizha's comeback to independent (non-film) music scenario, with the studio album Naa Oru Alien. Adhi stated that he composed another studio album before Naa Oru Alien; however since the duo completed their work on the latter, he stated that this will be released first as marketing their comeback to independent music. The album talks about Hiphop Tamizha's journey back into "the planet that is the independent music space".

In an interview with The New Indian Express, Adhi stated, "I am proud to be a Tamizhan, but if society is going discriminate people with labels like Tamizhan, Kannadiga or something else, I would rather stay away from the toxicity and identify myself as an alien", referencing the title of the album.

The album features six tracks in total. The first single from the album, "Net ah Thorandha", was released on 6 August 2020, and the complete album was released on 14 August 2020, despite Think Music initially announcing that it would release on 15 August.

== Track listing ==
Adapted from Apple Music.

All tracks are written by Hiphop Tamizha.

No.	Title	Length
1.	"Net ah Thorandha"	3:33
2.	"Dark Thoughts"	3:57
3.	"Ellamey Konja Kaalam"	4:38
4.	"Inayam"	3:03
5.	"Pogattum Pogattum Po"	4:00
6.	"Yaarumey Venam"	3:52
Total length:		23:03
