= Sivakumarin Sabadham =

2021 Indian film by Hiphop Tamizha

- Poster
- Directed by: Hiphop Tamizha
- Screenplay by: Hiphop Tamizha; Bala Singaravelan
- Story by: Hiphop Tamizha
- Produced by: Hiphop Tamizha; Senthil Thyagarajan; Arjun Thyagarajan
- Starring: Hiphop Tamizha; Prankster Rahul; Madhuri Jain
- Cinematography: Arjunraja
- Edited by: Deepak S. Dwaraknath
- Music by: Hiphop Tamizha
- Production companies: Sathya Jyothi Films; Indie Rebels
- Release date: 30 September 2021
- Running time: 138 minutes
- Country: India
- Language: Tamil

Sivakumarin Sabadham (transl. Sivakumar's vow) is a 2021 Indian Tamil-language musical comedy drama film written and directed by Adhi of Hiphop Tamizha who co-produced the film with Sathya Jyothi Films in the banner Indie Rebels. Adhi also stars as the lead alongside Prankster Rahul in his debut and Madhuri Jain. The film was released on 30 September 2021 to mixed reviews and did average collections.

== Synopsis ==
A young man from a weaving family vows to restore it to its past glory by taking on a textile magnate.

== Cast ==
- Hiphop Tamizha as Sivakumar
- Madhuri Jain as Shruthi
- Elango Kumanan as Varadharajan, Sivakumar's grandfather
- Kimu Gopal as Shruthi's father
- Adithya Kathir as Kathir
- Prankster Rahul as Murugan
- Parvathy Saran (VJ) as Aishwarya, Murugan's wife
- Ranjana Naachiyar as Aishwarya’s mother
- Devi Abhinaya as Sivakumar's mother
- Rahul Raj as Manoj

== Production ==
Principal photography began in October 2020, and wrapped in December that year within 65 working days.

== Soundtrack ==
The film's soundtrack was composed by Hiphop Tamizha, while lyrics written by Hiphop Tamizha, Rokesh and Ko Sesha.

Track listing
No.	Title	Lyrics	Singer(s)	Length
1.	"Sivakumar Pondati"	Hiphop Tamizha	Gana Michael	3:16
2.	"Bahubalikku Oru Kattappa"	Hiphop Tamizha	Hiphop Tamizha	3:22
3.	"Neruppa Irupaan"	Hiphop Tamizha	Padmalatha	2:56
4.	"Thillalangadi Lady"	Hiphop Tamizha	Hiphop Tamizha	3:20
5.	"Middle Class"	Rokesh	Bamba Bakya	3:03
6.	"Nesamae"	Ko Sesha	Anthony Daasan, Sudharshan Ashok	3:20
7.	"Orey Punnagai"	Hiphop Tamizha	Hiphop Tamizha
Total length:				15:57

== Release ==
=== Theatrical ===
Sivakumarin Sabadham released theatrically on 30 September 2021.

=== Home media ===
The film premiered in Disney+ Hotstar on 3 December 2021. The satellite rights were acquired by Star Vijay.

== Reception ==
Sivakumarin Sabadham received mixed reviews.

A critic from The Times of India gave the film 3 out of 5 and said "Sivakumarin Sabadham is a drama that wants to be a comedy". Srinivasa Ramanujam of The Hindu said "Aadhi’s latest offering tries to package a social issue in the midst of muddling comedy sequences."
