= Hip Hop Tamizhan =

- Front CD Cover

Studio album by Hiphop Tamizha
- Released: 17 August 2012
- Genre: Underground hip hop
- Length: 37:06
- Language: Tamil
- Label: Purple note
- Producer: Rémy Martin

Hiphop Tamizha chronology
Hip Hop Tamizhan (2012)	Naa Oru Alien (2020)

Hip Hop Tamizhan is the debut album of the Indian music duo Hiphop Tamizha, consisting of Adhi and Jeeva. It was released on 17 August 2012.

== Overview ==
Hip Hop Tamizhan was released on 17 August 2012 at Sathyam Cinemas in Chennai. Publicised as "India's first Tamil hip hop album", the album was launched by Purple note and produced by Rémy Martin, who was for the first time associated with an Indian album. The music for all the songs was composed by Adhi and Jeeva while the songs were penned by Adhi. "Club le Mabbule" was composed by Adhi when he was in his first year of college. One year prior to the album's release, when he "started taking it seriously and doing this as a project", he approached several radio stations who helped him on the song; a radio performance of the song received over four and a half lakh views on YouTube. The studio version was released on 26 August 2012. The official music video for Iraivaa was officially launched on 6 April 2013, and was uploaded to YouTube 13 April 2013.

== Reception ==
Venkatrangan R of Musicperk called the album "A must listen. Not only for the music but for the messages hidden in it." Naren Weiss, writing for Zomba, said it is "more than just an album. It's a carefully crafted story, the kind of CD you put on and listen to from start to finish." The album was a commercial success, and became the best-selling music album of 2012 on Flipkart.

== Track listing ==
All lyrics are written by Adhi.

No.	Title	Performers	Length
1.	"Manithan Tamizhan" (Intro)	Adhi	04:12
2.	"Tamizhanda"	Adhi	03:09
3.	"Tamizh Theriyum"	Adhi, Anusha	03:12
4.	"Club Le Mabbu Le"	Adhi	03:36
5.	"Sentamizh Penne"	Adhi, Josh	03:20
6.	"Ini Illaye Hum"	Adhi, Esha	03:04
7.	"Cheap Popularity" (Skit)	Adhi	01:44
8.	"Iraiva"	Adhi, Harini, Chitra	04:40
9.	"Karpom Karpipom"	Adhi, Susan, Mefi, Hamsini, Kamala	04:33
10.	"Hey Do What I Say"	Adhi	03:32
11.	"Stop Piracy" (Outro)	Adhi	02:21
Total length:			37:06
