= Meesaya Murukku =

2017 Indian film by Hiphop Tamizha

- Theatrical release poster
- Directed by: Hiphop Tamizha
- Written by: Hiphop Tamizha
- Produced by: Sundar C Khushbu Sundar (Presenter)
- Starring: Hiphop Tamizha; Aathmika; Vivek; RJ Vigneshkanth; Vijayalakshmi
- Narrated by: Hiphop Tamizha
- Cinematography: U. K. Senthil Kumar; Kiruthi Vasan
- Edited by: Fenny Oliver
- Music by: Hiphop Tamizha
- Production company: Avni Movies
- Distributed by: Rock Fort Entertainment
- Release date: 21 July 2017
- Running time: 136 minutes
- Country: India
- Language: Tamil

Meesaya Murukku (transl. Twirl your moustache) is a 2017 Indian Tamil-language coming-of-age musical comedy drama film written and directed by Adhi of Hiphop Tamizha in his directorial debut. He stars as the lead along with newcomer Aathmika as the female lead, while Vivek, RJ Vigneshkanth and Vijayalakshmi play supporting roles. The film, a partly fictionalised biopic of Adhi's early life, was released on 21 July 2017 to mostly positive reviews and was a box-office hit. It was later remade in Kannada in 2019 as Padde Huli.

== Plot ==
Coimbatore-based Adhi and Jeeva have been close friends since childhood. Adhi's father, Professor Ramachandran is very supportive of his interest in music and extra-curriculars. Adhi joins electrical engineering after school and falls in love with his college mate, Nila who was his childhood friend. Nila is from an affluent family, and her parents are against love. Despite Nila's reservations, she too falls in love with Adhi.

Adhi is well known in college for his Tamil raps, and owns a YouTube page "Hiphop Tamizha". Weeks before their final exams, Nila's family discover her relationship with Adhi. Nila's father and uncle threaten Adhi's family to break off the relationship. After graduating, Adhi tells his father of his interest to move to Chennai and become an independent musician. Adhi promises his father that he will return within a year if he cannot succeed. Adhi also promises Nila's father that he will seek a job within one year and marry her. Both Nila's and Adhi's fathers accept his promises half-heartedly, and Adhi's father does not provide financial support to him.

Adhi and Jeeva reach Chennai with instruments. They stay with their college seniors and try hard for opportunities, but all efforts fail. A year passes by, and the duo decide to return to Coimbatore. Before departure, they meet Ma Ka Pa Anand of Radio Mirchi, who allows them to sing "Club Le Mabbu Le" in his show, following which they come to Coimbatore.

As per his father's advice, Adhi enrolls for an MBA degree in Chennai. Suddenly, he finds that the video of "Club Le Mabbu Le" has gone heavily viral in social media, and has drawn thousands of fan followers. Adhi's hope is revived, and he decides to continue looking for an opportunity in the music industry and also promises his father that he will complete his post-graduation. At the same time, a big music company approaches Adhi for a paid concert in Chennai.

Since Nila has not consented to any marriage proposals, Nila's father threatens her with his suicide and arranges a wedding for her. Adhi gets shocked knowing that Nila's parents have fixed a wedding for her. Adhi covertly meets Nila and requests to wait for another year, for which Nila does not agree, replying that she had already waited for a year, and all is over. Adhi gets heartbroken and leaves to Chennai. Nila is married as per her parents' wishes, while Adhi becomes a popular personality in hip-hop music and in five years Adhi and Jeeva become famous music composers in cinema.

== Cast ==
- Hiphop Tamizha as Adhithya ("Adhi") a fictionalized version of himself
  - Vansh as Young Adhi
- Vivek as Ramachandran (Appa) - Adhi's father
- Aathmika as Vennila ("Nila") - Adhi's love interest since his childhood
  - Raksah Shyam as Young Nila
- RJ Vigneshkanth as Jeeva
  - Athish as Young Jeeva
- Vijayalakshmi as Viji (Amma) - Ramachandran's wife
- Maalavika as Manisha
  - Mridula Shree as Young Manisha
- Ma Ka Pa Anand as RJ Ma.Ka.Pa, himself
- Ananth Ram as Ashwin (Thambi) - Ramachandran's younger son, Adhi's brother
- Shah Ra as M. Balaji M. Tech. alias "Bijili"
- Madras Central Muthu as Nirmal alias "Mottai"
- Gajaraj as Mama, Nila's uncle
- Shweta as Shweta, Nila's elder sister
- Pradeep K Vijayan as Marshal - Adhi's college friend
- Guhan Prakash as Arun - Nirmal's best friend
- Poovendan as Markandeyan - a senior student in Adhi's college
- Anbu Thasan as Sanjay - Adhi's roommate in hostel also his best friend and Nila's colleague
- Hari Hara Krishnan as Vishnu - Adhi's college friend
- Thameem Ansari as Shraavan - Adhi's Opponent in Music Studio
- Vinoth Kumar as Sudhakar Anna - A college senior and Adhi's brotherly friend who finds a singing talent in Adhi
- Fenny Olivier as Ram - Adhi's college friend
- Meena Vemuri as Shweta and Nila's mother
- Manoj Kumar as Shweta and Nila's father

=== Special appearances ===
- Parithabangal Gopi in a cameo appearance
- Parithabangal Sudhakar in cameo appearance
- Ashwanth Thilak as Nila's fiancée in a cameo appearance
- Bharathan Kumanan (assistant director) in a cameo appearance
- Vishal (Hero) in a cameo appearance in Aambala music teaser video
- Sundar C (Producer) in a cameo appearance in Aambala music teaser video

== Production ==
=== Development ===
In August 2013, Aadhi, the lead singer of Hiphop Tamizha (HHT) revealed that he had been signed as lead for a full-length feature film based on HHT which was expected to be released by the mid of 2014. He also stated that there was a search for a suitable director to helm the spec script. During October 2016, a 90–second teaser was released on HHT's official YouTube channel, as news emerged that the film being titled as Meesaya Murukku produced by N. Ramasamy and Hema Rukmani for Thenandal Studio Limited, who green lit the project within five minutes of his narration and insisted him to perform as lead actor, after being impressed with his video song on Jallikattu, "Takkaru Takkaru". Apart from debuting as actor in a full-length role, Adhi also serves as writer and director besides composing the score and writing lyrics for the film. In a press meet before the film's release, Sundar C confirmed that it was partly biographical of Adhi's life. The film's title is derived from a phrase Adhi's father would often tell his son: "Thothalum jeythalum, meesaya murukku" (win or lose, always twirl your moustache).

Adhi has stated that while Meesaya Murukku is "predominantly based on real incidents", such as his five friends from the film and the character Sudhakaran being based on real people, certain liberties were taken to make the film commercially viable. The film depicts Adhi and Jeeva as having been childhood friends, whereas in reality, the duo met via Orkut in 2005, when they were teenagers.

=== Casting ===
As revealed in 2013, Adhi continued to be lead actor and chose Aathmika to pair for him, after coming across her Facebook profile. The film features a mostly new cast and crew as per Adhi's wishes, with being Vivek, who plays Adhi's father, the only established actor.

=== Filming ===
Though pre-production began in August 2013, the film, as of October 2016, was reported to have completed 45 days of shoot with two songs left to be shot. Filming ended by early November 2016.

== Music ==
Meesaya Murukku

Soundtrack album by Hiphop Tamizha
- Released: 14 April 2017
- Recorded: 2014–2017
- Genre: Feature film soundtrack
- Language: Tamil
- Labels: Think Music; Trend Music; Avni Music
- Producer: Hiphop Tamizha

Hiphop Tamizha chronology
Kavan (2017)	Meesaya Murukku (2017)	Kalakalappu 2 (2018)

Hiphop Tamizha composed the music of the film. A promotional song, "Sait Ji", was released in late 2016. Sundar received a legal notice from Ashok G Lodha of Shri All India Shwetamber Sthanakwasi Jain Conference. Lodha objected to the words "Sait Ji", meaning "affluent trader", and demanded that they be removed from the song, feeling it was "a classic example of abuse of the (Jain) community in the name of creativity and art." Sundar obliged, and had the words removed not only from the song, but also from the finished film, and the word "Sait Ji" was replaced with "Great Ji". The original YouTube video was deleted. The song "Vaadi Pulla Vaadi", released as a single years before the film was shot, appears onscreen.

All lyrics are written by Hiphop Tamizha.

Track listing
No.	Title	Singer(s)	Length
1.	"Great Ji"	Hiphop Tamizha	4:21
2.	"Machi Enggalukku Ellam"	Hiphop Tamizha	2:29
3.	"Enna Nadanthalum"	Kaushik Krish, Hiphop Tamizha	4:05
4.	"Maatikichu"	Mahalingam, Hiphop Tamizha	3:17
5.	"Vaadi Nee Vaadi"	Rajan Chelliah, Hiphop Tamizha	3:05
6.	"Meesaya Murukku – Title Track"	Kharesma Ravichandran, Hiphop Tamizha	3:42
7.	"Sakkarakatti"	Hiphop Tamizha	3:09
8.	"Vaadi Pulla Vaadi" (additional song)	Hiphop Tamizha	4:30
Total length:			28:38

== Critical reception ==
Meesaya Murukku received mostly positive reviews. Baradwaj Rangan wrote for Film Companion, "Meesaya Murukku could have been a celebration of Tamil-ness [...] But the film, frustratingly, settles into an uninspired chronicle of college life: ragging, lusting for biriyani, cultural events, and romance [...] Meesaya Murukku has a few moments, but it's neither an effective romance nor a convincing coming-of-age drama." Sify stated, "Meesaya Murukku is a decent debut directorial and heroic outing from Adhi, the film clicks mainly because of the real life connect".

== Sequel ==
A spiritual successor Meesaya Murukku 2, again directed by Adhi, was released on 25 September 2026.
