= Thani Oruvan =

2015 Indian film by Mohan Raja

- Theatrical release poster
- Directed by: Mohan Raja
- Written by: Mohan Raja; Subha
- Story by: Mohan Raja
- Produced by: Kalpathi S. Aghoram; Kalpathi S. Ganesh; Kalpathi S. Suresh
- Starring: Ravi Mohan; Arvind Swamy; Nayanthara
- Cinematography: Ramji
- Edited by: Gopi Krishna
- Music by: Hiphop Tamizha
- Production company: AGS Entertainment
- Distributed by: AGS Entertainment
- Release date: 28 August 2015
- Running time: 158 minutes
- Country: India
- Language: Tamil
- Budget: ₹15 crore
- Box office: ₹100 crores

Thani Oruvan (transl. The Sole One) is a 2015 Indian Tamil-language action thriller film directed by Mohan Raja, who co-wrote the script with Suresh and Balakrishnan. It is produced by Kalpathi S. Aghoram, S. Ganesh, and S. Suresh under AGS Entertainment. The film stars Ravi Mohan (credited as Jayam Ravi) and Arvind Swamy in lead roles. Nayanthara, Thambi Ramaiah, Ganesh Venkataraman, Harish Uthaman, Sricharan, Rahul Madhav, Nagineedu, Madhusudhan Rao, Saiju Kurup, Nassar and Mugdha Godse play supporting roles.

The plot revolves around an Indian Police Service (IPS) officer who wants to arrest an affluent scientist who uses secret, illegal medical practices for profit. Thani Oruvan was Raja's original story concept, unlike his previous ventures, which were remakes. Principal photography commenced on 6 December 2013, with filming taking place in various locations including Chennai, Bangalore, Hyderabad, Dehradun, Mussoorie, and other locations.

The music was composed by Hiphop Tamizha, while the cinematography and editing were handled by Ramji and Gopi Krishna respectively. The film was released on 28 August 2015 to critical acclaim, with praise for the direction, screenplay, storyline, soundtrack, pacing, and the performances of Jayam Ravi and Thambi Ramaiah, but especially Aravind Swamy. It was a commercial success and also became one of the highest-grossing Tamil films of the year.

The film was remade in Telugu as Dhruva (2016), and in Bengali as One (2017).

== Plot ==
In 1975, a low-level party cadre, Sengalvarayan, is dedicated to his cunning regional leader, Tamizhvanan, and his party to the extent that he is working for a party meeting when his wife goes into labor. Tamizhvanan accidentally comes to the area of Sengalvarayan's house and lends his car to take Sengalvarayan's wife to the labour ward, but the delivery happens safely inside the car.

In 1990, Sengalvarayan's son, Pazhani, secures the first rank in his 10th standard state exam and visits Tamizhvanan, now the chairman of the party and a member of the ruling coalition, for his blessings with his father. While they are waiting in the party office for the leader to come in, they witness an accidental murder of a rebel in the party by Tamizhvanan due to caste-related comments by the rebel on him. When Tamizhvanan asks Sengalvarayan to take the blame by saying that he killed the man due to rage about the rebel's comments, Pazhani volunteers to take the blame and is willing to go to prison, citing the leniency of juvenile laws in exchange for an MLA seat for his father in the upcoming by-elections. Tamizhvanan accepts, and Sengalvarayan later becomes an MLA.

In 2015, trainee IPS officers Mithran, Shakthi, Suraj, Kathiresan, and Janardhan discreetly assisted the police in catching a gang that kidnapped four girls. One day, Mithran receives a cryptic text message on his phone from an anonymous number stating that they are aware of their discreet activities. In the evening, they go out to meet that person, who is revealed to be Mahima, a forensic pathologist and Mithran's ex-girlfriend. Later that same night, they happened to witness the murder of a social activist named Raman, with the pretence of snatch theft. Mithran and his friend catch the gang and their leader and hand them over to the police. Four days later, the gang leader comes to the IPS headquarters with the Home Minister.

This political and organised crime comes as a shock to Mithran and his friends. Mithran takes them to his house and shows his research on connecting all small, unrelated incidents into the global view of a hidden crime network who bend the law for their own financial benefits. He singles out three influential people: pharmaceutical mogul Ashok Pandian, mineral magnate Charles Chelladurai, and chieftain Perumal Swamy. When he tries following one, he realizes that all three of them work as a group, and they all work for a wealthy and influential scientist, Siddharth Abhimanyu. After the completion of his training, Mithran is awarded medals for specializing in dealing with organized crime during training and also for being the best probationer of the batch, and is posted as the ASP of the Organized Crime Unit.

Mithran discovers that Siddharth is Sengalvarayan's son, Pazhani. After his release from prison, Pazhani had his name changed and left India to complete his education abroad. After his graduation, he returned to India and is now a well-established scientist. Siddharth uses the medical field for the wrong reasons and his own profit. Sengalvarayan is now the incumbent Health Minister in the minority government headed by Tamizhvanan, who is now the CM. At that time, Angelina, a Swiss pharmaceutical company owner and activist, tried to make generic medicines for life-threatening diseases available in India at a low cost affordable by poor people. Siddharth's assassin kills Angelina before she can sign the agreement document with the government and shoots Mithran at the same time, and the assassin is eventually killed by Vicky, another assassin of Siddharth.

While Mithran is recovering from the gunshot wound in the hospital, an electronic bug (GPS + audio transmitter) is implanted during another surgery by Siddharth. Through the bug, Siddharth listens to all of Mithran's plans and continuously monitors his whereabouts and conversations via audio transmission. Then comes evidence against Siddharth in the form of Manimekalai. Manimekalai was a scientist at Siddharth's research lab, where a seaweed that can cure diabetes is found abundantly in the oceans. Siddharth tries to sell the technology and rights to extract medicine from the seaweed to multinational pharmaceutical companies, but is opposed by Manimekalai, so Siddharth hires goons who kill her. Before being killed, Manimekalai records a video and stores it on an SD card so that someone will find it.

Before Mithran can find the card, Siddharth notices this and assigns Vicky, Perumal Swamy's brother, to recover the card, but Mithran tells Jana to retrieve the card. He successfully gets the card after a fight with Vicky, but Siddharth hears through the bug, abducts Jana, beats him up, and kills Jana with the help of Vicky after drugging him, with Mithran being unable to save his friend. Mithran comes back to his special house, where he finds a pin that has been changed in a picture, which turns out to be the picture of Ananya, who was Miss World 2011 and a close acquaintance of Siddharth, whose girlfriend Shilpa was also part of that event. Mithran doubts whether Siddharth himself would have come to his house. Mahima checks the fingerprints on the pin keeping the gun case Mithran received from Siddharth in his posting ceremony, and the fingerprints match. A flashback reveals that Siddharth had Shilpa's father killed through Perumal so that she would not participate in the competition, and as she will not have a ticket to attend her father's funeral, he offers to take her on his chartered flight and wins her over.

Mithran frantically searches for the bug, which he eventually finds and removes. Mithran captures Vicky and records all the information from him. He drugs Vicky with the help of his friends and manipulates Siddharth into killing him. At the same time, Siddharth's father reads the changed medical report, which contains excellent medical contracts for public welfare and multiple accusations against Tamizhvanan. When Siddharth learns about this, he asks Sengalvarayan to pretend to have chest pains and move outside to the hospital. The ruling party forces Sengalvarayan either to resign within 24 hours or be dismissed. Mithran appeals to Tamizhvanan that he has evidence and wants to arrest Siddharth, and he is granted permission to do so. Hence, Siddharth kills Sengalvarayan using Perumal in an accident and forces Tamizhvanan to stop actions against him, or he will lie that Tamizhvanan killed his father for personal vengeance, and even reveals to Tamizhvanan that he was the one who actually killed the rebel earlier in the movie. However, the next day at Sengalvarayan's state funeral, Mithran arrests him on Tamizhvanan's orders after revealing to Siddharth that he had already found where Sidharth had planted the bug on him.

When Siddharth is arrested, Mithran tells him that the medicine was patented in Manimekalai's name (despite Siddharth being the inventor) and will be made as a generic medicine instead of a patent-protected one. It is also revealed that Sengalvarayan is still alive, saved by Mithran and his gang, and the public funeral held was for Jana. Mithran makes a deal that he would save Siddharth's life for information and evidence on all of his criminal associates and activities, and gives him a bulletproof vest to fake his death during his transport to the court, as Sengalvarayan even tries to convince Siddharth to wear it despite knowing Siddharth tried to have him killed. Mithran planned to take down the setup planned by various VIPs to kill Siddharth by having his friend Suraj shoot him in a fake encounter and sentence him to lifelong imprisonment. When one of them gets close to Siddharth, Mithran pushes him, and learns that Siddharth did not wear the vest, and is fatally shot by Shilpa. Before dying, Siddharth tells Mithran that he hid all the evidence in an SD card in the bulletproof vest, adding that he had not done it for the nation, but because Mithran had asked for it. Mithran reveals the evidence to the public and concludes that reading a newspaper about Siddharth getting arrested in 1990 motivated him to become a police officer.

== Cast ==
- Ravi Mohan as ASP Mithran IPS
- Arvind Swamy as Dr. Siddharth Abhimanyu alias Pazhani Sengalvarayan
  - Master Jack Robinson as young Pazhani Sengalvarayan
- Nayanthara as Dr. Mahima, a forensic specialist and a former IPS; Mithran's love interest
- Thambi Ramaiah as Sengalvarayan, the dim-witted Health Minister, Siddharth's father
- Ganesh Venkatraman as Shakthi IPS, Mithran's batchmate and friend
- Harish Uthaman as Suraj Singh IPS, Mithran's batchmate and friend
- Sricharan as Kathiresan IPS, Mithran's batchmate and friend
- Rahul Madhav as Janardhan IPS "Jana", Mithran's batchmate and friend
- Nassar as C.M Thamizhvanan
- Vamsi Krishna as Vicky, Perumal Swamy's brother
- Ashish Vidyarthi as DCP Sivasubramaniam IPS, Mithran's father
- Suhasini Maniratnam as Saradha, Mithran's mother
- Jayaprakash as Ramaswamy, Mahima's father
- Geetha as Janaki, Mahima's mother
- Nagineedu as Ashok Pandian
- Madhusudhan Rao as Perumal Swamy
- Saiju Kurup as Charles Chelladurai
- Mugdha Godse as Shilpa, Siddharth's lover
- Abhinaya as Manimekalai, Siddharth's junior scientist
- Junior Balaiah as Raman, social activist
- R. M. Ramnath Shetty as a doctor
- Anil Murali as Murali, Siddharth's Laboratory Security
- Kalesh
- Krishkanth
- Ajay Rathnam as DCP Krishnaswamy
- Sindhu as child smuggler's wife
- Sanjana Singh as Ammulu, child smuggler's concubine
- Sharad as Kumar
- Sriranjini as Mrs. Raman
- Sathish as Police Inspector
- Birla Bose as CBI officer
- Thamizhselvi as doctor's wife
- Akilesh as child smuggler's son
- Maha Gandhi as child smuggler
- Aathma Patrick as henchman
- Hiphop Tamizha Adhi as himself in the song "Theemai Dhaan Vellum"

== Production ==
=== Development ===
In February 2013, Ravi Mohan stated he would work under his brother Mohan Raja's direction, and that he had been working on the script for the past six months. Unlike his earlier ventures which were mainly remakes, he was said to have developed an original story concept. Raja said, "This film is close to my heart; it's an experimental script and I've put my heart and soul in penning it". The film began without a title and was referred to by the tentative title, Thani Oruvan, which was confirmed as the film's official title in June 2014. It was produced by AGS Entertainment, who agreed to finance the project as early as 2008, but was stalled after Ravi got an opportunity to act in Engeyum Kadhal (2011).

=== Casting ===
In July 2013, Nayanthara signed on to be part of the project. Raja said he cast Nayanthara opposite Ravi because he "wanted a matured actress like her to be a part of the film". Ganesh Venkatraman was cast for a pivotal role, and the actor told that the film focuses on friendship and that he, Ravi and Nayanthara played friends in the film. In July 2014, it was later revealed that Arvind Swamy would be playing the antagonist. Raja wanted to cast an actor "whose attractiveness would act as a distraction from his evilness. And I chose one of the most attractive male actors in this country for that role". Hindi actress Mugdha Godse was paired opposite Arvind Swamy, marking her Tamil debut.

=== Crew ===
Devi Sri Prasad, Yuvan Shankar Raja and S. Thaman were first reported to be the music composers of the film, with the latter revealing that he had been in talks. However, Hiphop Tamizha was finalised as the music director in March 2015. The film's cinematography was handled by Ramji, and V. T. Vijayan was at first in charge of the editing, but was later replaced by Gopi Krishna. Stunt Silva and Dhilip Subbarayan choreographed the action sequences, while the choreography for the songs were handled by Brinda.

=== Filming ===
The principal photography for this film kickstarted on 6 December 2013, with a two-day schedule in Chennai at Binny Mills where a railway station set had been erected, and romantic flashback portions involving Ravi Mohan and Nayanthara were shot. The crew then moved to Bangalore in January 2014, where filming was held at a police training college. As of February 2014, filming was underway in Mahabalipuram, Bangalore, Sri Ramanujar Engg College, Vandalur and Hyderabad. In March, Ravi stated that the team had also shot in Rishikesh, Dehradun and that the third schedule was currently happening in Mussoorie. This film was shot on film, by cinematographer Ramji, which he feels may be the last Indian film to be shot in this format as the industry has moved to digital filming. The film's budget was initially planned to be ₹15 crores but surpassed ₹20 crores due to delay and budget overrun, Raja and Ravi had to forgo their salaries in order to complete the film. As of April 2015, the makers have completed 80% of the film's shoot, with three of the songs being needed to be canned, which were completed in June 2015, along with the completion of the film's principal photography. Filming was completed by July.

== Music ==
Thani Oruvan's soundtrack album and background score was composed by Hiphop Tamizha. The album features five songs, four of them penned by the composer, and one written by Mohan Raja. Following the success of his debut independent album Hip Hop Tamizhan, Mohan Raja advised Adhi to compose the tracks with the essence of his independent music project. As a result, he composed two songs based on the indie music format. The soundtrack album was released on 25 July 2015 at the Suryan FM 93.5 Radio Station, with the presence of the film's cast and crew. Actor Aravind Swamy had recorded his voice over for "Theemai Dhan Vellum", which was used as a promotional song and was not featured in the film. This was later reused as "Manishi Musugulo Mrugam Neney Ra" in the Telugu remake of the film, Dhruva (2016).

== Release ==
=== Theatrical and distribution ===
Sun Pictures initially signed a contract for the distribution rights for the film; they later opted out after numerous failures of Ravi and negative talk about the film; later AGS Entertainment, the production house of the film itself, acquired the distribution rights. The film was initially slated to release on 14 August 2015, coinciding with the Independence Day weekend, later the release was postponed to avoid a clash with Vasuvum Saravananum Onna Padichavanga and Vaalu, which were slated to release on the same day. The film was scheduled for a solo release on 28 August 2015. The film's USA theatrical rights were sold to Atmus Entertainment, and was released in more than 18 screens in the USA.

=== Home media ===
The film's television premiere took place on Sun TV on 1 May 2016, coinciding with May Day.

== Reception ==
=== Box office ===
The film collected ₹14.50 crore (US$1.5 million) in Tamil Nadu in first day. It also collected US$1.87 Million in the United States. In Chennai, the film earned ₹1.28 crore in its first weekend; in its second weekend the film collected ₹1.06 crore at the box office. The total collection of the film by the end of 18 days was ₹34.86 crore. The film collected more than ₹65 crore within 10 days of its release at the worldwide collections.

Thani Oruvan completed 50 days of theatrical run, in which the film's worldwide collection was estimated to be over ₹150 crore.

=== Critical response ===
The film opened to critical acclaim, with praise for the direction, screenplay, storyline, pacing and the performances of Ravi Mohan and Thambi Ramaiah but especially Aravind Swamy.

The Times of India rated the film 4 out of 5 and wrote "Thani Oruvan is a bit too long [..] And even though it is a plot-driven film, the film gives us well-rounded characters, who lend the slightly far-fetched story plausibility". Baradwaj Rangan of The Hindu wrote, "Thani Oruvan makes the most of the sustained cat-and-mouse game between Mithran and Siddharth. The authors (Subha), are credited as co-writers, and this is the first time their pulp sensibility really shines through", calling it "a pretty, smart pulpy thriller". Rediff stated "Thoughtfully etched-out characters add depth and intensity to the narration, while great music and impressive cinematography enhance the overall experience". Sify wrote, "Powered by a staggering performance from Ravi Mohan and Arvind Swamy, director Mohan Raja does a good job of creating a taut, intelligent, and deliciously twisted action drama that delivers so much more than your average thriller...what makes Thani Oruvan, an enjoyable watch is its, original screenplay, the smart presentation and excellent characterisation". Deccan Chronicle gave it 3.5 stars and wrote, "With the use of technology, an emphasis on slyness and mind over matter, director M. Raja and his team have crafted a film that is sure to keep you at the edge of your seat while entertaining you thoroughly in the process". IBN Live rated the film 3.5 out of 5 and wrote "The film stands on one and a half legs because Siddharth Abhimanyu will rank among the best villains whereas Mithran IPS will miss the mark in the heroes section by a large margin, Nayanthara is deliciously comfortable in her role as Mahima". The core idea of implanting GPS and transmitter was reported to be based on the 2010 Korean movie I Saw The Devil.

== Sequel ==
In July 2019, Ravi Mohan and director Mohan Raja, planned for the film's sequel, which was expected to start rolling in 2021. An announcement video was also released on August 2023. In September 2025, Mohan Raja said that the movie deserves a huge investment. As of October 2026, no update has been given.

== Remakes ==
The film was remade in Telugu as Dhruva (2016) with Arvind Swamy reprising his role. It was also remade in Bengali as One (2017).

== Legacy ==
Thani Oruvan was listed in Top 20 Best Films of 2015, by Baradwaj Rangan of The Hindu, and was also listed in Top 10 Best Films of the year by Sify. Daily news and Analysis also listed in their "Ten Tamil movies of 2015, you should never miss"
