= Kadaisi Ulaga Por =

2024 Indian science fiction film

- Theatrical release poster
- Directed by: Hiphop Tamizha
- Written by: Hiphop Tamizha
- Produced by: Hiphop Tamizha
- Starring: Hiphop Tamizha; Nassar; Natty Subramaniam; Anagha
- Cinematography: Arjunraja D. F. Tech
- Edited by: Pradeep E. Ragav
- Music by: Hiphop Tamizha
- Production company: Hiphop Tamizha Entertainment
- Distributed by: Tentkotta; Simbaaaa Productions
- Release date: 20 September 2024
- Running time: 138 minutes
- Country: India
- Language: Tamil

Kadaisi Ulaga Por (transl. The Last World War) is a 2024 Indian Tamil-language science fiction action thriller film written, directed and produced by Adhi of Hiphop Tamizha. The film stars Adhi, alongside Nassar, Natty Subramaniam, Anagha, N. Azhagam Perumal, Harish Uthaman, Munishkanth, Singampuli, Kalyan Master, Elango Kumaravel, Thalaivasal Vijay and Mahanadi Shankar. Set in a dystopian 2028, it revolves around the war in India after it refused to alliance with the neighbouring country.

The film was announced in February 2023. Principal photography commenced the same month and wrapped in February 2024. The film has music composed by Hiphop Tamizha, cinematography handled by Arjunraja D. F. Tech and editing by Pradeep E. Ragav. It was released worldwide on 20 September 2024 in theatres to positive reviews from critics and performed well at the box office, making it a profitable venture.

== Plot ==
In 2028, China forms the 'Republic,' an international organisation to challenge the United Nations, in ally with Russia and 72 countries, including India's neighbours, with an objective of "One Nation One Republic". They impose economic sanctions on countries refusing to join, leading to a halt in oil supply from Russia and the Middle East. India's foreign exchange reserves plummeted, triggering internal unrest and riots. In the Pacific Ocean, at NATO's camp, a bombing attack is launched by 'Republic' on USA ships, causing petrol prices to skyrocket to Rs.500 per litre.

Kingmaker Natarajan "Nataraj", a benefactor and brother-in-law of the bedridden Chief Minister GNR, compels GNR's daughter, Keerthana, to enter politics and eventually makes her the Education Minister, despite her reluctance. Keerthana had earlier met Thamizharasan "Thamizh", an orphan, during a trek and fallen in love. Thamizh guides her in making informed political decisions and helps propose a new education policy, gaining her widespread support. However, Nataraj, irritated with Keerthana, orders his friend, Commissioner Prakash Amudhavanan, to uncover the mastermind behind her political moves. Amidst this chaos, the Government of India investigates the Republic-Money Laundering scam.

However, Tamil Nadu police arrests the state's opposition leader before the CBI could apprehend him, as orchestrated by Nataraj and Union Finance Minister Ramakrishnan "Central Ramki," who had allegedly shared black money earned through scams during Central Ramki's tenure as Defence Minister. Since the black money is denominated in Republic currency, it is stored in containers at the Chennai Harbour. To prevent the opposition leader from turning approver to the CBI, Nataraj plans to temporarily detain under the state police and later release him. Nataraj also orchestrates a riot at Puratchi Veeran Pulipandi's meeting, aiming to bring the state under police control, thereby restricting CBI's probe, and using the time to relocate those containers. Keerthana and Thamizh are caught in the riot, and Thamizh tries to escape with Keerthana, but his friend gets killed in a nearby bomb blast, and Thamizh is framed as a terrorist.

The riot spreads across Tamil Nadu, garnering support against Pulipandi's arrest. Paramilitary force takes control over the city, and an emergency is soon expected to be declared. Nataraj exploits actor Revolution Star Rishikanth's fan base by having him state against Pulipandi. An urgent Defence Council meeting addressing the intrusion of Republic warships into India's territorial waters near Vishakapatnam is held making the army get mobilised to Chennai Harbour. Despite Central Ramki's resistance, an emergency is declared, and the army takes control of Tamil Nadu's security, custodying the opposition leader. Nataraj discovers through Prakash Amudhavanan that Thamizh was a special gun marshal in the UN anti-poaching squad and orders his killing. However, Major Prabhjoth Singh arrests Nataraj regarding the squandered black money.

On 15 February 2029, air attacks commence over Delhi, Ahmedabad, and Mumbai, even disrupting ISRO's space station connection due to nuclear radiation. Chennai faces severe bombings and from the Madras Regiment office, Thamizharasan, Kingmaker Nataraj, Prabhjoth Singh, Inspector Encounter Dass, Constable Perumal and the opposition leader are seen fleeing the Army Madras Regiment Office amidst bombings. Also, the 'Republic' troops from Sri Lanka, led by Army General of Sri Lankan base, Priyanka Perriera, infiltrated into Tamil Nadu. The Indian army surrenders after the Republic army's guerrilla warfare and GNR is announced as Prime Minister of the Southern Province. General Tso and the espionage agent Chu Khoy Sheng establishes eight concentration camps. As supplies dwindle, they target the elderly and injured.

Meanwhile, in Masinagudi, the escaped Thamizh leads a secluded camp, hiding from the 'Republic' forces. Nataraj awakens from a coma and finds Pulipandi, Prabhjoth, Dass, Perumal, and others united under Thamizh. Nataraj attempts to seize control of the camp but fails. Nataraj reforms after witnessing a pregnant woman's tragic death and joins Thamizh. They witness Republic troops arriving nearby for bauxite mining. Nataraj and a few others infiltrate the camp, meet Prakash Amudhavanan and Rishikanth, and with their aid discover the aluminium is for communication antennas. Thamizh devises a strategy to capture Priyanka and negotiate with General Tso. Thamizh, Dass, and Prabhjoth form three teams: Thamizh attacks the maintenance room, Dass and Perumal infiltrate through the loading dock, and Prabhjoth enters the mines. They intoxicate the Republic soldiers using mad honey in their food.

Tamizh fights Priyanka and holds him captive, thereby releasing the captives, but Constable Perumal is killed. However, Pulipandi accidentally shoots Priyanka, foiling the negotiation plans. So, Thamizh devises a new plan to send Priyanka's and other soldiers' bodies to Chennai, threatening to kill the remaining 'Republic' soldiers. Meanwhile, Thamizh infiltrates the torture camp in disguise, Nataraj reunites GNR and Keerthana with Thamizh but Nataraj betrays them, allowing the Republic army to capture them. It is then revealed, that it was a trap set by Thamizh and Nataraj to kill the Republic army soldiers attacking Masinagudi camp and those dead bodies brought from Masinagudi are actually Prabhjoth and his team. They detonate throughout the torture camp building and Pulipandi diverts some soldiers to the TV Station, only to be arrested by Prakash. Thamizh kills General Tso, and GNR is rescued. However, Chu Khoy Sheng triggers the metro train bomb, thereby destroying their own camp and ultimately meeting his demise in the building collapse.

With the Republic army weakened, the people now unite to fight back bravely, dubbing it the 2nd War of Indian Independence. Finally, despite political differences, Pulipandi and GNR greet each other, Nataraj hugs Prakash, and Thamizh reunites with Keerthana. Recognizing Thamizh's leadership, Nataraj resolves to be his kingmaker.

In mid-credits scene, its revealed that war was not started by Human's but AI robots.

== Cast ==
- Hiphop Tamizha as Thamizharasan "Thamizh"
- Natty Subramaniam as Kingmaker Natarajan "Nataraj"
- Anagha as Keerthana, GNR's daughter
- Harish Uthaman as Major Prabhjoth Singh
- Nassar as CM GNR
- Azhagam Perumal as Puratchi Veeran Pulipandi
- Munishkanth as Inspector Encounter Dass
- Singampuli as Constable Perumal
- Kalyan Master as Commissioner Prakash Amudhavanan
- Elango Kumaravel as Bhai
- Thalaivasal Vijay as Union Finance Minister Ramakrishnan "Central Ramki"
- Mahanadi Shankar as Venkat
- Shah Ra as Revolution Star Rishikanth
- Mai Song Tung as General Tso, Naval Commander, Republic Army
- Vijayan as Priyanka Perriera, Army General of Republic Army's Srilankan base
- Vinoth GD as a Constable
- Guhan Prakash as Sekar
- Chu Khoy Sheng as Chu Khoy Sheng, an espionage agent, Republic Army
- Alex
- Rocket Rajesh
- Shailesh

== Production ==
On 21 February 2023, the occasion of his birthday, Adhi of Hiphop Tamizha announced a project starring himself; however, he did not reveal any further details, including the cast or crew. Principal photography commenced the same day, and wrapped exactly a year later, on 21 February 2024. On 18 July the same year, the film's title, Kadaisi Ulaga Por, was announced, in addition to the technical crew which included cinematographer Arjunraja D. F. Tech, editor Pradeep E. Ragav, stunt choreographer Mahesh Mathew and art director R. K. Nagu.

== Music ==
Kadaisi Ulaga Por

Soundtrack album by Hiphop Tamizha
- Released: 20 September 2024
- Genre: Feature film soundtrack
- Language: Tamil
- Label: Think Music
- Producer: Hiphop Tamizha

Hiphop Tamizha chronology
Buddy (2024)	Kadaisi Ulaga Por (2024)	Aalambana (TBA)

Singles from Kadaisi Ulaga Por
- 1. "Boombastic" Released: 9 August 2024; 2. "Suthanthira Swasam" Released: 15 August 2024; 3. "Unakaaga" Released: 22 August 2024

The music and background score is composed by Hiphop Tamizha. The audio rights were acquired by Think Music. The first single titled "Boombastic" was released on 9 August 2024. The second single "Suthanthira Swasam" was released on 15 August 2024, coinciding with India's Independence Day. The third single "Unakaaga" was released on 22 August 2024. The entire soundtrack album was released on 20 September 2024.

Track listing
No.	Title	Lyrics	Singer(s)	Length
1.	"Boombastic"	Hiphop Tamizha; Rajan Chelliah	Hiphop Tamizha; Chinnaponnu; Rajan Chelliah	3:23
2.	"Suthanthira Swasam"	Hiphop Tamizha; Kharesma Ravichandran (English lyrics)	Hiphop Tamizha; Kharesma Ravichandran; Kaushik Krish	2:18
3.	"Unakaaga"	Hiphop Tamizha	Hiphop Tamizha	2:16
4.	"Arasiyal Undertaker"	Hiphop Tamizha	Hiphop Tamizha; V. M. Mahalingam	2:14
5.	"Adhirgiradha"	Hiphop Tamizha	Hiphop Tamizha	2:25
6.	"Keerthana"	Vignesh Srikanth	Raakho; Hiphop Tamizha	2:22
7.	"I'm a Beast"	Hiphop Tamizha; Brodha V	Hiphop Tamizha; Brodha V	2:09
8.	"Unkitta Solla"	Vignesh Srikanth	Meenakshi Ilayaraja	2:03
9.	"Indha Yudham"	Hiphop Tamizha	Kutle Khan	1:38
10.	"Karandha Paal"	Sivavakkiyar	Hiphop Tamizha	1:50
11.	"Ettuthikkum"	Hiphop Tamizha	Hiphop Tamizha	3:11
Total length:				25:49

== Release ==
=== Theatrical ===
Kadaisi Ulaga Por was released worldwide on 20 September 2024.

=== Home media ===
The film began streaming on Amazon Prime Video from 24 October 2024.

== Reception ==
Roopa Radhakrishnan of The Times of India gave 3.5/5 stars and wrote "Kadaisi Ulaga Por deserves appreciation for what it set out to do and how the film has managed to attain it. Of course, the film is not without flaws and there are occasional slumps in between that aren't exactly engaging, but as an overall feature, this Hiphop Tamizha Aadhi directorial is an experience to cherish." Anusha Sundar of OTTplay gave 2.5/5 stars and wrote "Kadaisi Ulaga Por has a solid premise and with someone like Adhi at the front of it, has immense potential to become a dystopian war drama that Tamil cinema has never seen. But with its boggling screenplay and disjointed narrative, the film appears to be less ambitious than it set out to be."

Jayabhuvaneshwari B of The New Indian Express wrote that "the film constantly manages to make you laugh and keep you entertained. Initially, you would expect the film to offer a heavy dose of political sermons with a side of science fiction. While it did offer these things, the action and thriller portions turned out to be the most entertaining." Gopinath Rajendran of The Hindu wrote, "Hiphop Tamizha Adhi’s Kadaisi Ulaga Por is a mishmash of interesting ideas wrecked by its crude treatment".
