= Hiphop Tamizha =

Indian musical duo

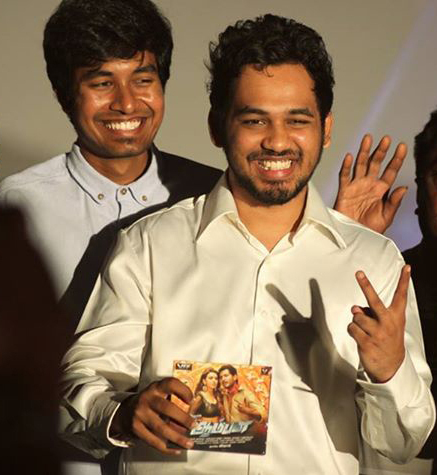
- Jeeva (L) and Adhi (R) during Aambala's audio launch

Background information
- Born: Rangadhithya Ramachandran Venkatapathy; R. Jeeva; Adhi: 20 February 1990 (age 36); Jeeva: 29 June 1991 (age 35)
- Genre: Hip hop
- Instruments: Piano, DAW and Keyboard
- Years active: 2005–present
- Labels: Think Music India, Sony Music, Saregama, T-Series
- Members: Adhi; Jeeva
- Website: hiphoptamizha.com

Hiphop Tamizha (pronounced [t̪amiɻaː]) is an Indian musical duo based in Chennai Tamil Nadu. The duo consists of Rangadhithya "Adhi" Ramachandran Venkatapathy and R. Jeeva. (Note: While Hiphop Tamizha has sometimes been referred to as a group, or as Adhi's solo project, Adhi clarified the band's membership during the audio launch of Aambala in December 2014 .)

Their commercial breakthrough came with the song "Club le Mabbu le" in 2011.

In 2012, Hip hop Tamizha released their debut album Hip Hop Tamizhan, which is India's first Tamil hip hop album. It was a major success with both the general public and critics. While the duo were originally independent musicians, since 2013 they have contributed primarily to composing for films.

== Personal lives ==
Rangadhithya "Adhi" Ramachandran Venkatapathy was born on 20 February 1990, and R. Jeeva was born 29 June 1991. Adhi's father works at Bharathiar University while his mother comes from an agricultural background. Adhi's first exposure to rap came when his neighbour showed him Michael Jackson's "Jam". His interest in hip hop music started developing in the tenth grade. He uploaded rap songs to the internet and got positive responses from people expressing interest in his music, who also encouraged him to start rapping in Tamil. His decision to rap in Tamil rather than English was made, in his words, to avoid looking like a "wannabe". Adhi named his account on the video-sharing site in YouTube as "Hiphop Tamizha", with a profile picture of the Tamil poet Subramania Bharati, to avoid being caught by his parents. Adhi's father had initially opposed his choice to pursue music professionally. He wanted Adhi to pursue higher studies, but gave him a year to do what he wanted, with the only constraint being that Adhi should not expect any help from him. After realising that Adhi was "trying to do some good work", he encouraged his son's musical interests. Adhi then moved to Chennai to "try [his] luck".

Although Hiphop is a duo, Jeeva has seldom made public appearances, thus associating the name Hiphop Tamizha with Adhi more often. Adhi told IndiaGlitz that this is due to his shyness, and compared his partner to the unseen lion in the emblem of India, which includes four lions, with only three visible. Jeeva adopted the moniker Jeeva Beatz sometime after the two met in 2005.

Adhi studied at Chavara Vidya Bhavan and Electrical Engineering at Bannari Amman Institute of Technology. He holds a state-level rank in Tamil Nadu Common Entrance Test and is a graduate in Master of Business Administration from the Department of Management Studies, University of Madras. As of October 2014, he was doing a PhD course at Bharathiar University, which he completed in June 2015. In August 2023, Adhi obtained a doctorate in Music Entrepreneurship. Jeeva is an alumnus of Loyola College, Chennai.

On 30 November 2017, Adhi married Latchaya in a private ceremony at Tirupati.

== Career ==
=== Origins and early work ===
Adhi and Jeeva met via Orkut in 2005. They were passionate about music and decided that they should create an independent music group in India, in Tamil. According to The Hindu and Hiphop Tamizha's Facebook page, Adhi had not officially founded Hiphop Tamizha until 15 February 2010.

Around the mid-2000s, Adhi released Viswaroobam Arambam, the first Tamil hip hop mixtape in India. (Note: While a 2011 report by The Hindu claimed that Viswaroobam Arambam was released in 2006, the official Facebook page of Hiphop Tamizha gives its release year as 2005.) It also played a major role in promoting hip hop as a part of the Tamil culture. Adhi and Jeeva remained underground until they were asked by the Tamil Nadu State Election Commission to compose an election anthem. Hiphop Tamizha's single Ezhuvoam Vaa was chosen as the official anthem for Tamil Nadu's 2011 state elections, and Adhi performed it at Pachaiyappa's College when Anna Hazare came there. Though the song was commercially unsuccessful, Adhi and Jeeva considered it at one point their "best work so far".

=== Commercial success ===
Adhi composed the song "Club le Mabbu le" in his first year of college. When we asked how it developed, he recalled, "I grew up watching my mother and aunts just being traditional, and when I saw girls going to bars, I immediately wrote the lyrics of that track. And through my lyrics I am raising the debate over whether we are really changing as a society or are simply aping the West." When Adhi was living in Chennai, he met Ma Ka Pa Anand, then an RJ at Radio Mirchi. Anand allowed Adhi to perform Club le Mabbule on his radio show with beatboxer Bharadwaj Balaji (also known as Triple B). The recording went viral, receiving over two million views within a week of its release on YouTube. Afterwards Rémy Martin, an international brand, was surprised by Adhi's determination and launched Hiphop Tamizha as an official brand. "Club le Mabbule" later vaulted Hiphop Tamizha further into public view when it was criticised as portraying Tamil women in a negative light.

Hiphop Tamizha's debut album Hip Hop Tamizhan was released on 17 August 2012 at Sathyam Cinemas in Chennai. Publicised as "India's first Tamil hip hop album", it was launched by Purple Note and produced by Remy Martin, in the latter's first association with an Indian album. The music was composed by Adhi and Jeeva, with lyrics by Adhi. The album was lauded by critics. Naren Weiss, writing for Zomba, called it "nothing short of a masterpiece", while Venkatrangan R of Musicperk labelled it "A must listen. Not only for the music but for the messages hidden in it." The album, which included Club le Mabbule, was also a commercial success, becoming the best-selling music album of 2012 on Flipkart. However, Adhi lamented the fact that "Club le Mabbule" was accepted for airplay by radio channels only after its viral success, and that some of his other songs never got airplay even once.

In November 2013, Adhi signed an international album with Remy Martin, titled International Tamizhan, slated to feature eight tracks, including two songs by American artists Sol and Emcee Call. The album was to be released in English, Hindi and Tamil. It was initially scheduled for release on 15 August 2014; however, Hiphop Tamizha instead released the album's song "Vaadi Pulla Vaadi" as a single on the same date. In October 2014, Adhi said the album was still "under progress", but confirmed in 2018 that it was altogether dropped because "independent music doesn't make big money" in Chennai. In August 2020, Adhi announced a new album titled Naa Oru Alien.

=== Television and cinema ===
==== As musicians and composers ====
Though Adhi initially expressed no interest in singing or composing for films, he and Jeeva have contributed to numerous cinematic works. Adhi sang his first film song, titled "Thapellam Thappe Illai" (composed by Vijay Antony) for Naan in 2012. He also sang the title track of Ethir Neechal (2013) (composed by Anirudh Ravichander) accompanied by Punjabi rapper Yo Yo Honey Singh. Also in 2013, Adhi wrote "Sudden Delight", which was composed by Santhosh Narayanan and performed by Rob Mass for Soodhu Kavvum. In May of that year, Adhi again collaborated with Anirudh Ravichander to perform the song "Chennai City Gangsta" along with Hard Kaur for Vanakkam Chennai.

In July 2013, Hiphop Tamizha composed "Na Na Na (Nice v/s Naughty)", a song used in the promotion of The Smurfs 2 in India. The song, which also features nine contestants from the singing reality show Indian Idol Junior, was the first song Hiphop Tamizha composed specifically for a film. It did not appear on the soundtrack album. Adhi's third collaboration with Anirudh was for Kaththi (2014) where he performed the song "Pakkam Vanthu". Hiphop Tamizha also composed and wrote "Poda" in 2014, a song celebrating the 10th anniversary of the television channel Sun Music.

Hiphop Tamizha's first Tamil film as music composers was Aambala (2015), where they wrote all six songs for and performed three: Pazhagikalaam, Aye Aye Aye and a remix of Inbam Pongum Vennila, from Veerapandiya Kattabomman (1959). They also composed for Indru Netru Naalai, writing two songs and performing one: "iPhone 6 Nee Yendral". Hiphop Tamizha also composed for Thani Oruvan, where they performed two songs: Theemai Dhaan Vellum and the title track. Thani Oruvan topped Apple Music's Best of 2015 list in the category "Best Tamil Album of the year".

Adhi wrote and co-performed Naam Vaazhndhidum, composed by Yuvan Shankar Raja, for Vai Raja Vai (2015). Hiphop Tamizha later composed for Aranmanai 2, Kathakali, Dhruva (the Telugu remake of Thani Oruvan), which marked their debut in Telugu cinema; Kaththi Sandai; Kavan, and Imaikkaa Nodigal.

==== As Actor ====
In October 2014, Adhi stated that, despite many offers, he had no interest in acting. In 2016, however, he announced that he would be making his cinematic acting debut in Meesaya Murukku, for which he would also be director and musical composer. The film, released in 2017, was partly biographical of his life. Adhi has also made appearances in the Zee Tamizh talk show Simply Kushboo, and the Sun TV reality show Sun Singer. Hiphop Tamizha later composed the title music for the TV series Nandini. Hiphop Tamizha also made his second movie as a lead character in Natpe Thunai and his third film Naan Sirithaal, was released on 14 February 2020. After Meesaya Murukku, they are back to direct another movie which is titled as fourth Sivakumarin Sabadham without also producing in the banner Hiphop Tamizha Entertainment with Sathya Jyothi Films. Following that the fifth movie titled Anbarivu pooja has held on 14 December 2020 and the movie is filming around Coimbatore and Pollachi. This movie will be Adhi's first rural-based film. The shooting for the film will begin in mid-January 2021 after Pongal.

=== Collaborations ===
Independent artists who have collaborated with Hiphop Tamizha include Bharadwaj Balaji and B-boy Bravo. The official logo of Hiphop Tamizha is a graffiti of Bharati. They have also performed with American rapper Emcee Call on All I Wanna Say, an album that features several samples of Michael Jackson's songs.

Beginning in February 2015, Adhi and Jeeva were collaborating with independent Tamil singer Kaushik Krish on his forthcoming single, but the singer's debut song eventually became "Kannala Kannala", composed by Hiphop Tamizha for Thani Oruvan (2015). Recently he have collaborated with Sangan (Sollisai Selvandhar) in a new single named as "Weightu". Hiphop Tamizha has started a new initiative called "The UnderGround Tribe" to collaborate with new independent artists.

== Musical style ==
Adhi told Sudhish Kamath that he was inspired by the works of Michael Jackson and Jay-Z. In July 2013, he said that he draws inspiration from Tamil poetry, mostly those by Subramania Bharati. Hiphop Tamizha frequently fuse Tamil folk music with western hip hop. Adhi has no formal education in music and claims to compose purely on instinct.

Topically, Hiphop Tamizha's songs deal with a wide range of issues. Club le Mabbu le describes certain nontraditional "failings" of Tamil women, including drinking, smoking, consuming cannabis and having live-in relationships. Sentamizh Penne, the exact opposite of Club le Mabbu le, talks about a culturally-rich girl, whose traditions are worthy of respect. Tamizh Theriyum ridicules those who mock the Tamil language or act like they do not speak it. Vaadi Pulla Vaadi focuses on the conflicts of caste and love, and was inspired by the personal experiences of Adhi's friends. According to him, Iraiva talks about how love is not the end of life: "Two people might really be in love, but because of things like caste, they might not be able to be together. This, we feel, is because of lack of education and awareness". The song Karpom Karpippom is dedicated to education, describing it as the main tool required to solve social problems. Cheap Popularity is Adhi's response to those who criticised him for allegedly seeking popularity through Club le Mabbu le.

In 2014, Adhi said that Hiphop Tamizha's aim is to rebuke the belief among contemporary youngsters that conversing in Tamil is "not cool", and that the project was started to enable them to "relate to the concept of being a proud Tamizhan, to give them an identity." Although the songs Manithan Tamizhan and Tamizhanda glorify the culture and language of Tamil Nadu and lament their modern-day negligence, Adhi has stated that Hiphop Tamizha does not want to preach that Tamil people should speak their native language or praise it unduly, but to give it a little more respect like English. He has also said that he wants to change the Indian urban culture of hip-hop being about wearing "baggy pants, 'bling' and big shirts" and eliminate the notion that rap music is about "the money, the women and the gangster-ism."

=== Notable performances ===
In December 2010, Hiphop Tamizha performed live at "One Chennai, One Music", (an event organised by Radio One to promote independent music in Chennai), which was one of the band's first major gigs as underground artist. In November 2011, Adhi and Bharadwaj Balaji performed at Astra, the two-day inter-school cultural festival of Bhavan's Rajaji Vidyashram, Kilpauk. September 2012 was one of Hiphop Tamizha's busiest months, with the band singing at Madras Christian College's "Deepwoods", Dr G R Damodaran College of Science's Brand Expo 2012, Loyola College's Ovations, Kilpauk Medical College's Pradharshini, and Alagappa College of Technology's Sampradha.

On 4 May 2013, Hiphop Tamizha appeared live at Madras Music Academy in a concert organised by SS International. Adhi performed for the second time at Madras Music Academy in October 2014, this time as part of SS International's nine-day concert Navotsavam. In July 2015, Adhi sang at Isai Sangamam, a musical event organised by the NGO Raindropss. He also performed live at a January 2016 concert named Nenje Ezhu to raise funds for victims of the 2015 South Indian floods.

== Controversies ==
"Club le Mabbu le" became the subject of immense criticism due to its portrayal and depiction of Tamil women. Rapper Sofia Ashraf claimed that the song was not only disrespectful to women, but also an insult to rap music. In an interview with The Hindu, Adhi said, "Hip hop is about self expression and opinions so such controversies are only natural. The song was intended as a fun number and most people like it because the lyrics are witty. We also sings [sic] about social causes like education and individual identity". Nevertheless, Adhi has since been apologetic about the track. In December 2015, Janani Karthik of The Times of India named the song as one of several Tamil songs "that have taken crass to an all-low level".

In 2016, Adhi released "Takkaru Takkaru", a music video that glorifies the Tamil sport jallikattu, with the intention of campaigning to have jallikattu legalised, claiming that the sport does not encourage animal cruelty. PETA India's associate manager of campaigns Bhuvaneshwari Gupta described the video as factually inaccurate, adding that it actually showed many scenes of bulls being cruelly treated, and concluded, "Hip Hop Tamizha is better off sticking to just making music, because factual accuracy is not their strong point. Respecting bulls is true Tamil culture, not inflicting pain on them and making them suffer." Adhi decried these comments, stating that he would not believe in an organisation run by "foreigners" telling him that jallikattu is harmful to bulls. In January 2017, Adhi took part in the protests against the ban on jallikattu but later withdrew due to his displeasure with the anti-national and secessionist elements in the protests.

== Other works ==
In November 2013, Hiphop Tamizha launched "Tamizhanda Clothing", a collaboration between the duo and a firm named Difference of Opinion. Adhi later launched his second business venture, "Madrasi Mafia", a music label to manage independent music artists. In July 2015, Adhi conducted a seminar on brand management, titled "Face to Face: Hiphop Tamizhan" at Dr G R Damodaran College of Science, Coimbatore.

== Filmography ==
The films mentioned here include performance only by Adhi.

=== Films ===
- All films are in Tamil, unless otherwise noted.

Year	Title	Role	Notes
2017	Meesaya Murukku	Adhithya "Adhi"	
2019	Natpe Thunai	Prabhakaran "Prabha"	Also creative and casting director
2020	Naan Sirithal	Gandhi	
2021	Sivakumarin Sabadham	Sivakumar	
2022	Anbarivu	Anbazhagan "Anbu" and Arivazhagan "Arivu"	Dual role
2023	Veeran	Kumaran (Veeran)	
2024	PT Sir	Kanagavel	
2024	Kadaisi Ulaga Por	Thamizharasan "Thamizh"	
2026	Meesaya Murukku 2	DJ Jeeva, Tiger Siva, Gaana Das and Himself	Quadruple role sequel to Meesaya Murukku

=== Documentary Series ===
Year	Title	Role	Notes
2019	Tamizhi	Narrator (only voice)	Also producer
2021	Thee Veeran	Himself	

=== As director, writer, and producer ===
Year	Title	Credited as			Notes
Year	Title	Director	Writer	Producer	Notes
2017	Meesaya Murukku	Yes	Yes	No	
2021	Sivakumarin Sabadham	Yes	Yes	Yes	Produced under Indie Rebels
2022	Anbarivu	No	Story	No	
2024	Kadaisi Ulaga Por	Yes	Yes	Yes	Produced under Hiphop Tamizha Entertainment
2026	Meesaya Murukku 2	Yes	Yes	No	Sequel to Meesaya Murukku

== Awards ==
Year	Award	Category	Result	Ref.
2013	BIG FM Awards Night	Internet sensation of the year	Won	
2013	Anna University's annual event Techofes	Independent Artist of the Year	Won	
2015	Edison Awards	The Rising Star of 2014 Male	Won	
2016	SIIMA Awards	Best Music Director – Thani Oruvan	Nominated	
2016	Mirchi Music Awards South	Upcoming Music Composer of the year - Thani Oruvan For "Kadhal Cricket" and "Kannala Kannala"	Nominated	
2017	Desi Awards	Digital Pride of the year	Won	
2018	City Cine Awards	Favourite Debutant	Won	
2018	SIIMA Awards	Best Debut Actor – Meesaya Murukku	Nominated	
2018	SIIMA Awards	Best Music Director – Meesaya Murukku	Nominated	
2018	SIIMA Awards	Best Male Playback Singer - Kavan For"Oxygen" (Along with Sudarshan Ashok)	Nominated	
2018	Behinwoods Gold Medals	Best Entertainer – Meesaya Murukku	Won	
2019	Behindwoods Gold Mic Awards	The Icon of Independent Music	Won	
2020	Blacksheep Digital awards	Epitome of Tamil pride – Tamizhi	Won	
