= Paayum Puli (soundtrack) =

- Soundtrack album cover

Soundtrack album by D. Imman
- Released: 15 August 2015
- Recorded: 2015
- Genre: Feature film soundtrack
- Length: 35:44
- Language: Tamil
- Labels: V Music; Divo
- Producer: D. Imman

D. Imman chronology
Vasuvum Saravananum Onna Padichavanga (2015)	Paayum Puli (2015)	10 Endrathukulla (2015)

Singles from Paayum Puli
- 1. "Silukku Marame" Released: 3 August 2015

Paayum Puli is the soundtrack album to the 2015 film of the same name directed by Suseenthiran starring Vishal and Kajal Aggarwal. The film's soundtrack featured eight songs composed by D. Imman with lyrics written by Vairamuthu. The soundtrack was preceded by the lead single "Silukku Marame" released on 3 August 2015, and the album was released on 15 August, under the V Music label. The music received positive reviews from critics praising the orchestration and composition but was critical of its placement.

== Development ==
Paayum Puli is Vishal's second and Suseenthiran's third consecutive collaboration with Imman after Pandiya Naadu (2013) and Jeeva (2014). By mid-March 2015, Imman completed composing two songs in the soundtrack. Imman chose Diwakar, known for his work in Airtel Super Singer, to provide vocals for the song "Marudakkaari" whose composition was based on both the Valaji raga and the Malayamarutam raga. In late June 2015, Imman revealed through Twitter that Divya Kumar and Shashaa Tirupati were chosen for a racy song whose lyrics were penned by Vairamuthu. Armaan Malik recorded the song "Yaar Indha Muyalkutty" which he considered it as one of his difficult songs due to its tricky composition and his unfamiliarity with the Tamil language at first.

== Release ==
The album contained five tracks and the karaoke versions of three of them. The song "Silukku Marame" was released as a single track on 3 August 2015 at Prasad Labs in Chennai. The soundtrack was released on 15 August 2015 at Sathyam Cinemas, Chennai, with the presence of the film's cast and crew. The soundtrack of the Telugu version was released on 23 August 2015 at Hyderabad. The album covers of both the original as well as for the Telugu versions depict a still of the lead pair from the song "Silukku Marame".

== Track listing ==
Tamil
No.	Title	Lyrics	Singer(s)	Length
1.	"Puli Puli Paayumpuli"	Vairamuthu	Malgudi Subha	04:46
2.	"Marudakkaari"	Vairamuthu	Diwakar	04:24
3.	"Naa Soodana Mogini"	Vairamuthu, Rakendu Mouli (Telugu)	Jyoti Nooran	04:44
4.	"Yaar Inda Muyalkutty"	Vairamuthu	Armaan Malik	04:03
5.	"Silukku Marame"	Vairamuthu, Shashaa Tirupati, Muralidhar (English)	Divya Kumar, Shashaa Tirupati, Sharanya Gopinath	04:40
6.	"Marudakkaari (Karaoke)"	—	Instrumental	04:24
7.	"Yaar Inda Muyalkutty (Karaoke)"	—	Instrumental	04:03
8.	"Silukku Marame (Karaoke)"	—	Instrumental	04:40
Total length:				35:44

Telugu
No.	Title	Lyrics	Artist(s)	Length
1.	"Puli Puli"	Vennelakanti	Malgudi Subha	04:45
2.	"Urike Chilaka"	Sri Mani	Sooraj Santhosh	04:22
3.	"Nae Mojaina Mohini"	Sahithi	Kalpana Raghavendar	04:42
4.	"Yae Chitti Jinka Pilla"	Ramajogayya Sastry	Sri Krishna	04:03
5.	"Telugu Thanama"	Chandrabose, Shashaa Tirupati, Muralidhar	Vedala Hemachandra, Chinmayi, Sharanya Gopinath	04:35
Total length:				22:27

== Reception ==
Karthik Srinivasan of Milliblog summarised "Good tunes and better orchestration – Imman in form". Choosing "Silukku Marame" and "Yaar Indha Muyalkutty" as the picks of the album, Siddharth K. of Sify rated the soundtrack 2.5 out of 5 and stated "On the whole, Paayum Puli is an album which has two tracks that work. The remaining tracks pass muster. One hopes the screenplay is racy enough & make up for the remaining tracks to grab the viewer's attention". S. Saraswathi of Rediff.com noted that "music by D. Imman leaves a lot to be desired [with] mediocre songs disrupt the narration". Anupama Subramanian of Deccan Chronicle noted "Music by Imman has plenty of masala during the first half." Kirubhakar Purushothaman of India Today wrote "D Imman's background score makes an impact, but other songs have just used Kajal's dates." M. Suganth of The Times of India wrote "Imman’s songs, despite being catchy and energetic, are bathroom breaks as they don’t fit in with the plot."
