= Veeramae Vaagai Soodum =

2022 Indian Tamil-language action thriller film

- Theatrical release poster
- Directed by: Thu Pa Saravanan
- Written by: Thu Pa Saravanan
- Produced by: Vishal; Dato Abdul Malik
- Starring: Vishal; Dimple Hayathi
- Cinematography: Kavin Raj
- Edited by: N. B. Srikanth
- Music by: Yuvan Shankar Raja
- Production companies: Vishal Film Factory; Malik Streams Corporation
- Distributed by: SSI Productions (Tamil Nadu); AV Media Consultancy (Karnataka)
- Release date: 4 February 2022
- Running time: 166 minutes
- Country: India
- Language: Tamil

Veeramae Vaagai Soodum (transl. Only bravery wins) is a 2022 Indian Tamil-language action thriller film written and directed by Thu Pa Saravanan and produced by Vishal and Dato Abdul Malik under the banner of Vishal Film Factory and Malik Streams Corporation. It stars Vishal and Dimple Hayathi, while Raveena Ravi, Baburaj, and Yogi Babu play supporting roles. The soundtrack and background score were composed by Yuvan Shankar Raja, while the cinematography and editing were handled by Kavin Raj and N. B. Srikanth. The film marks the posthumous appearance of noted actor-director R. N. R. Manohar, who died on 17 November 2021 from COVID-19 complications.

Veerame Vaagai Soodum was released in theatres on 4 February 2022, where it received mixed reviews from critics and became an average venture at the box office.

== Plot ==
In Chennai, Purusothaman "Porus", an aspiring police trainee, aims to become an IPS officer. He hails from a middle-class family consisting of his father Constable Ponnuswamy, mother, Kanchana, and sister, Dwaraka.

Meanwhile, Parishuddam, a social activist, organises a protest against a factory in Karaikudi District owned by an influential business magnate named Nedunchezhiyan. The factory waste destroyed a prosperous village. Guna is the brother of a local don named Selvam, who eve-teases Dwaraka. Guna threatens Dwaraka again, and Porus takes him to Selvam's house. Selvam slaps Guna and reprimands him. Faizal, Dwaraka's friend, confesses his love for Dwaraka to Porus.

In a parallel story, Elanchezhiyan alias Ela, Nedunchezhiyan's younger brother and a classmate of Dwaraka, threatens a girl named Divya. Divya and Dwaraka both try to commit suicide at their respective houses. Selvam tries to compromise with Porus's family, while Nedunchezhiyan also talks to Parishuddam and attempts to bribe him. Ela's father also talks to Divya and her father. Simultaneously, Parishuddam insults Nedunchezhiyan, Dwaraka humiliates Guna, and Divya humiliates Ela. Ela plans to kidnap Divya, while Guna plans to abduct Dwaraka. Nedunchezhiyan plans to kidnap Parishuddam. Ela accidentally kidnaps Dwaraka while she is visiting the medical store, while Ravi and his gang kidnap Parishuddam and take him to Nedunchezhiyan's factory.

Meanwhile, Dwaraka escapes from Ela, where she witnesses Nedunchezhiyan and his gang beheading Parishuddam. Nedunchezhiyan and his associates try to capture Dwaraka. While hiding, Dwaraka tries to call her father, but to no avail. She cleverly records and sends a voice message to Faizal, detailing Nedunchezhiyan's involvement in Parishuddam's death. Nedunchezhiyan captures and kills Dwaraka. After searching for Dwaraka with Porus, Faizal arrives home and listens to the voice message, but Nedunchezhiyan's men kill him.

Porus learns about his sister's death, which devastates him and his family. Guna surrenders in court, alleging that he killed her. Porus later discovers that Faizal's and Dwaraka's deaths are not chronological, so he investigates in his own way. Porus goes after each gang member involved in Nedunchezhiyan's crime network to find the conspirators behind Dwaraka's and Faizal's deaths, but Nedunchezhiyan kills each gang member, including Ravi. Porus requests a hacker to check Faizal's phone, where Porus uncovers some brutal murders orchestrated by Nedunchezhiyan, including Guna's death.

After analysing the day when Dwaraka was kidnapped, Porus finds out that Divya was to be abducted by Ela. Nedunchezhiyan and his men realise this through Ela's friends and kill Divya despite Porus's intervention. At the hospital, the hacker retrieves the recording from Faizal's phone, where Porus learns about the facts leading to Dwaraka's death. Nedunchezhiyan hears the recording through his henchman Mike and kidnaps Ponnuswamy, telling Porus to hand over the recording in exchange for his father.

Porus brings the recording, but gets thrashed by the gang. However, he retaliates by thrashing Nedunchezhiyan's gang and killing Ela. Porus brings Selvam to Nedunchezhiyan and tells him to avenge Guna's death. Selvam kills Nedunchezhiyan and his men with a chainsaw, while Porus leaves the factory with his father. With the help of Divya's devastated father, Raghupathi, Porus feeds their flesh to crocodilesin a zoo where Raghupathi works, thus leaving no evidence about their deaths. After this, Porus gets appointed as an IPS officer and secretly gives money to Parishuddam's son for hospital treatment.

== Cast ==
- Vishal as Purusothaman "Porus"
- Dimple Hayathi as Mythili, Porus's love interest
- Raveena Ravi as Dwaraka, Porus's sister
- Baburaj as Nedunchezhiyan
- Yogi Babu as Thalapathy, Porus's friend
- G. Marimuthu as Constable Ponnuswamy, Porus and Dwaraka's father
- Tulasi as Kanchana, Porus and Dwaraka's mother
- Elango Kumaravel as Parishuddam
- Raja Chembolu as Elanchezhiyan a.k.a. Ela, Nedunchezhiyan's younger brother
- R. N. R. Manohar as Inspector Kaatamuthu
- Deepthi as Divya
- George Maryan as Raghupathi, Divya’s father
- K. S. G. Venkatesh as Paneer, Mythili's father
- Porkodi as Mythili's mother
- V. I. S. Jayapalan as Nedunchezhiyan's father
- Vazhakku En Muthuraman as Pava, Parishuddam's relative
- Agilan Pushparaj as Faizal, Dwaraka's friend
- Gandhi as Selvam, a local don
- Prem as Guna, Selvam's brother
- Pudhupettai Suresh as Ravi
- Billy Murali as Mike, Nedunchezhiyan's henchman
- Kavitha Bharathi as Inspector Neethirajan
- Sabitha Roi as Parishuddam's wife
- Krishna Chaitanya as Parishuddam's son
- Navin Krubhakar as Nallan, Elachezhiyan's friend
- Kumanan Sethuraman as Nedunchezhiyan's driver
- Supergood Subramani as Headmaster

== Production ==
=== Development ===
The film was tentatively titled as Vishal 31. On 29 August 2021, the film's title was announced as Veeramae Vaagai Soodum, which is a reference of a lyric of the title track of 1986 film Vikram, composed by Yuvan Shankar Raja's father Ilaiyaraaja.

=== Casting ===
Vishal was cast as an aspiring police officer named Porus. Dimple Hayathi was cast in as the female lead opposite Vishal which was her second Tamil film after Devi 2, while Malayalam actor Baburaj was cast in as the main antagonist.

=== Filming ===
Principal photography began on 6 May 2021 and wrapped on 3 January 2022.

== Music ==
Yuvan Shankar Raja composed the soundtrack and background score of the film while collaborating with Vishal for the 11th time after Sandakozhi, Thimiru, Thaamirabharani, Theeradha Vilaiyattu Pillai, Avan Ivan, Samar, Poojai, Irumbu Thirai, Sandakozhi 2 and Chakra. The first single "Rise Of A Common Man" was released on 22 December 2021, while the second single was released on January 14, 2022.

Track-List
No.	Title	Lyrics	Singer(s)	Length
1.	"Rise of A Common Man" (Theme Music 1)	-	Nivedita	3:11
2.	"Thithikkirathe Kangal"	Vivek	Yuvan Shankar Raja	3:15
Total length:				6:26

== Release ==
=== Theatrical ===
The film was dubbed in Hindi under the same title, in Telugu as Saamanyudu, and in Kannada as Obba. It was released on 4 February 2022.

=== Home media ===
The satellite and digital rights of the film were sold to ZEE5 and Zee Tamil.

== Reception ==
Veerame Vaagai Soodum received mixed reviews from critics with praise towards the action sequences, cast performances (particularly Vishal), and background score but criticism for its predictability and characterization.

On the review aggregator website Rotten Tomatoes, 20% of 5 critics' reviews are positive, with an average rating of 5/10.

=== Critical response ===
M. Suganth of The Times of India gave 3 out of 5 stars and wrote "VVS is definitely engaging as long as it sticks to this core plot. There is suspense and thrills and we are also emotionally invested because Saravanan has managed to set-up the family of Porus in convincing fashion. This is why we feel like we are watching a robust action drama." Pinkvilla Desk of Pinkvilla gave 3 out of 5 stars and wrote "Vishal is known for playing such intense roles now. As usual, he got into the skin of his character and he has outdone his performance this time as well."

Thinkal Menon of OTTplay gave 3 out of 5 stars and wrote "The film is a treat for those who love revenge thrillers with superbly choreographed action sequences and intriguing cat-and-mouse games. " Haricharan Pudipeddi of Cinestaan gave 3 out of 5 stars and wrote "Veeramae Vaagai Soodum makes for a decent watch. It does feel long-drawn at 2 hours 46 minutes, but the action will keep you pinned till the last minute."

Movicrow gave 2.25 out of 5 stars and wrote "What might have been a simple and relatable actioner, turns into a lengthy boring fair as the movie takes itself so seriously by trying to touch and bring together too many needless topics." 123Telugu gave 2.75 out of 5 stars and wrote "The film is a slow-paced action drama with a decent concept. Vishal’s power-packed performance, Yogibabu’s comedy, and the suspense in the second half are basic assets. If you bear a few over-the-top scenes and the slow narration, you can give this action drama a shot this weekend."

Ashameera Aiyappan of Firstpost gave 2 out of 5 stars and wrote "The film argues that bravery is enough to win. But it is not enough to be bold; one also needs to be smart. Unfortunately, the film fails on that front." Sowmya Rajendran of The News Minute gave 1.5 out of 5 stars and wrote "Thu Pa Saravanan’s film is so full of cliches and convenient coincidences that I wondered if the title Kaadhil Poo Soodavum would have been more suitable since that's what it demands from the audience."

=== Box office ===
The film had an average opening weekend, grossing only ₹18 crore (US$1.9 million).
