= Paayum Puli (2015 film) =

2015 film by Suseenthiran

- Theatrical release poster of Tamil version
- Directed by: Suseenthiran
- Written by: Suseenthiran; Arun Balaji; Amudeshiver (Dialogues)
- Produced by: S. Madhan
- Starring: Vishal; Kajal Aggarwal; Soori; Samuthirakani
- Cinematography: Velraj
- Edited by: Anthony
- Music by: D. Imman
- Production company: Vendhar Movies
- Distributed by: Escape Artists Motion Pictures; Frames Inevitable
- Release date: 4 September 2015
- Running time: 135 minutes
- Country: India
- Language: Tamil
- Budget: ₹25 crore

Paayum Puli (pouncing tiger/tiger will pounce) is a 2015 Indian Tamil language action thriller film written and directed by Suseenthiran starring Vishal and Kajal Aggarwal, with Soori and Samuthirakani in supporting roles. The film was produced by Vendhar Movies and distributed by Escape Artists Motion Pictures. Music for the film was composed by D. Imman. The cinematography was handled by Velraj and the editing done by Anthony.

Principal photography commenced on 4 March 2015 and lasted for four months. Paayum Puli was shot predominantly in and around Chennai and other parts of Tamil Nadu in 75 working days. The film was released on 4 September 2015 worldwide in its Tamil version as Paayum Puli and in its Telugu version as Jayasurya.

== Plot ==
In Madurai, a gang kidnaps top businessmen in the city and demands a sum of ₹2 crore (US$210,000) for their release or the victims will be killed. The dead bodies are placed beneath a bridge. Bhavani and Lal are the main culprits behind the kidnaps. SI Albert cracks the case and encounters the kidnappers involved in the kidnap, but gets publicly killed by Bhavani. Albert's parents eventually commit suicide. Jayaseelan is the new ACP who gets deputed in Madurai, and is appointed by the special branch to eliminate Bhavani and his gang in police encounters. He also lives with his father, mother and his brother Selvam. Murugesan is the head constable and a close friend of Jayaseelan.

Meanwhile, Jayaseelan meets Sowmya and falls in love with her. Later, Jayaseelan pretends to hold a meeting with Bhavani and his gang to finalize his commission so he will never interfere in their illegal activities, where he encounters two of Bhavani's men. Bhavani is frightened, knowing that someone has set an eye on him that and he will be the next target. Jayaseelan tracks down Bhavani and kills him. Just before dying, Bhavani challenges Jayaseelan that all of the kidnapping incidents will continue after his death, which leaves Jayaseelan puzzled. It is later revealed that Selvam is actually the mastermind behind all the kidnapping incidents, and is the close friend of Lal. Both are involved in planning the kidnappings and murdering the businessmen, while Bhavani is involved only to execute the plan.

Past: Jayaseelan and Selvam's grandfather Ramasamy is a famous freedom fighter, and is widely respected by the local people. He also serves as a minister for 4 terms and is known for his genuineness and loyalty. However, Ramasamy's son Kumarasamy (Jayaseelan and Selvam's father) is not interested in politics and preferred to stay away from all politics following his father's death. Singarasu, a local politician and Kumarasamy's cousin, decides to bank on Ramasamy's political support for his victory. Singarasu convinces Selvam to support his party, for which Selvam agrees. Singarasu won in the election, became an MLA and a minister for 5 years.

Selvam is encouraged by a few party men to contest for the same MLA seat during the next election, but Singarasu is the man behind the plan and wants to defeat Selvam to show his power. Selvam trusts a few friends, but later understands Singarasu's plan and loses the election, as Singarasu provided money to vote for him to the public. This enrages Selvam, and decides to earn money and use it for election purposes. He makes his lawyer friend Pankaj Lal to earn Singarasu's confidence and collect all the information about his illegal activities, while they also heavily involve in kidnapping rich businessmen in the city and demanding money.

Present: Selvam knows that Jayaseelan is handling the kidnap case. and closely monitors his moves. Sowmya's father, Lakshmi Narayanan, is kidnapped by Selvam and his men demanding money. Narayanan hands the money to Selvam, who appears with a mask in front of him, while collecting the money. The next day, a meeting is arranged between Jayaseelan and Sowmya's family members to discuss their marriage proposal. At that time, Narayanan observes Selvam's mannerisms and doubts that he could be the one who kidnapped him. Selvam understands that Narayanan's suspicion and decides to kill him before he could contact Jayaseelan. Narayanan requests Jayaseelan to meet him immediately, but he ends up being killed by Selvam before that ever happened.

Jayaseelan formulates a plan to find the culprit, where he decides to tap the mobile phones of all the leading businessmen in Madurai so that he can get to know if the kidnapper calls any of them demanding money. A special team is set up to find the persons involved in phone tapping. A businessman gets a call demanding money, and Jayaseelan decides to follow the person without anyone's knowledge. While the businessman is about to hand over the money to Selvam and Lal, Jayaseelan interferes. Selvam and Lal escape and are chased by Jayaseelan. Jayaseelan shoots and arrests Lal, but Selvam shoots himself in his upper arm, stages a scene that someone has shot him and ran away. Jayaseelan admits Selvam in the hospital.

Meanwhile, Lal is killed inside the commissioner office by a hitman employed by Selvam. Jayaseelan and Selvam's father overhears a conversation of Selvam with one of his henchmen on his cell phone and found out that Selvam is the mastermind behind all of the kidnapping incidents. Selvam decides to kill his father. Later, Jayaseelan conducts a secret investigation against Selvam and finds out the truth. He receives evidence that Selvam shot himself based on the number of gunshots heard and also understands that Selvam staged a show that he was shot by the culprit who ran away. Jayaseelan goes to Selvam's hideout and finds a secret room behind where their father is tied to a chair. Jayaseelan saves his father and brings him back home.

Selvam is shocked to know that all of his illegal activities are exposed to his family members. He requests them not to take any action as he will become the next minister after election. Suddenly, Selvam rushes to kill Jayaseelan and his father. Jayaseelan retaliates and hits Selvam. Finally, their father asks Jayaseelan to kill Selvam, saying that it will be a big embarrassment for their family, especially Ramasamy's image in the society if the truth comes out to the public. Jayaseelan agrees and kills Selvam, where he puts his dead body beneath the bridge, where usually the kidnappers place the dead bodies of rich businessmen, staging a scene that Selvam is also killed by the kidnappers demanding money. After this, Jayaseelan encounters Selvam's hitmen, and frames them as the culprit behind the kidnappings and closes the case.

== Cast ==
- Vishal as ACP Jayaseelan
- Kajal Aggarwal as Sowmya, Jayaseelan's love interest (Voice dubbed by Raveena Ravi)
- Soori as Murugesan, Jayaseelan's best friend
- Samuthirakani as Selvaraj (Selvam), Jayaseelan's elder brother, the main antagonist
- Aishwarya Dutta as Divya, Sowmya's sister
- Jayaprakash as Lakshmi Narayanan, Sowmya's father
- R. K. as Minister Singarasu
- Murali Sharma as Advocate Lal
- Anandaraj as Inspector Manikandan
- Vela Ramamoorthy as Kumarasamy, Jayaseelan's and Selvam's father
- Sreeja Ravi as Jayaseelan's mother
- Harish Uthaman as Sub-Inspector Albert
- Bangalore Swamy as Bhavani
- Yuvina Parthavi as Selvam's daughter
- DMJ Rajasimhan as Vettu Rajendran
- George Maryan as Teacher
- D. R. K. Kiran as Mahaprabhu
- K. S. G. Venkatesh as Rathnavel
- Rajalingam as Bhavani's brother
- Manoj Kumar as Albert's father
- Ramanath Shetty as a businessman
- Krishnamoorthy
- Matthew Varghese as police officer
- Velraj as Driving Instructor (cameo appearance)
- Aruldoss in a guest appearance, ACP Jayaseelan's team
- Appukutty in a guest appearance
- T. Siva in a guest appearance, person crossing the road
- Nikita Thukral as special appearance in the item song "Naan Soodana Mogini"

== Production ==
=== Development ===
After completing the work on Jeeva (2014), Suseenthiran collaborated with Vishal after Pandiya Naadu (2013) for a film whose script work began in mid August 2014. The technical crew of Jeeva were planned to be retained for this film. However, cinematographer R. Madhi was replaced by Velraj as the former failed to allot callsheets after being signed as the cinematographer of Srimanthudu (2015). Suseenthiran said in an interview that this was the first script he worked on typically to suit an actor's image. The film, produced under the banner Vishal Film Factory, was said to be on the lines of Pandiya Naadu.

Vendhar Movies was later confirmed to bankroll the film whose production was scheduled to begin after the release of Vishal's Aambala (2015). Talking about the film's concept, Suseenthiran said that "if someone offends a normal guy, he would definitely retaliate then think about a police officer, who gets affected and offended" forms the major crux of the film. In March 2015, lyricist Vairamuthu confirmed Kaaval Kottam as the film's title and Madurai was chosen as the film's backdrop. Shortly, the film's title was rechristened as Paayum Puli after the 1983 Tamil film of the same name.

The same was announced by the makers through the official Twitter page on 25 March 2015. Regarding the title selection, Vishal told in an interview that being an action film, he and Suseenthiran found Paayum Puli apt for the film and approached its owner A. V. M. Balasubramaniam for his consent before declaring the title officially. Anthony and Rajeevan were signed as the editor and art director respectively. Anal Arasu and Shobi choreographed the action sequences and the songs respectively. Filmmaker R. S. Amudeshwar wrote the film's dialogues. Paayum Puli was made on a budget of around ₹250 million.

=== Casting ===
"My character's name in the film is Sowmya. She is a docile, down to earth, humble and very simple girl. She is very afraid of small and simple things. She is scared to cross the road, scared of darkness, scared of ghost. This is the uniqueness character. And though she is scared of the small things she still has the courage and she is brave enough to face the big things in life. This contradiction is very interesting."

— Kajal Aggarwal, in an interview with IndiaGlitz in August 2015.

Vishal played the role of Jayaseelan, an undercover police officer in the film. This was the third time in his career where he was seen playing a police. Vishal lost 10 kilograms (22 lb) to suit this character. After holding talks with Shruti Haasan for the female lead role, the makers chose Lakshmi Menon, the female lead of Pandiya Naadu, in mid September 2014. Vishal said that this decision was taken considering the scope of the character and also since Suseenthiran wanted an actress who can understand Tamil well. Menon later expressed her inability to allot callsheets till April 2015 due to her Twelfth grade examinations and eventually, Kajal Aggarwal replaced her as the film's female lead in early December 2014 marking her first collaboration with Vishal and second with Suseenthiran after Naan Mahaan Alla (2010).

Kajal played the role of Soumya, a girl owning a plant nursery who is scared of everything, including small things such as crossing the roads. Describing her character in the film, Kajal said that despite being sure about what she wants, her character is afraid of even small things due to which she could not relate to the character. Aishwarya Dutta was signed to play Kajal's sister in the film. Though Samuthirakani was initially reported to play the film's antagonist, Vishal later clarified that he would be seen as his brother in the film. Harish Uthaman, one of the antagonists of Pandiya Naadu, was signed to play a brief role of a young policeman reportedly inspired by the real life of Sub inspector Alwin Sudhan, who was killed by a gang in Tamil Nadu in 2012.

Soori, Jayaprakash, Murali Sharma and Anandaraj were signed to play supporting roles in the film. R. K. was signed to play a 55-year-old politician while Soori and Jayaprakash were reported to play Vishal's friend, a constable and Kajal's father, a businessman in the film respectively. Nikita Thukral, who performed an item number in Vendhar Movies' Saroja (2008), was signed to perform a special song in the film. Art director Kiran told IANS in late May 2015 that he would be seen as one of the antagonists in the film. Sharath Lohitashwa, who collaborated with Suseenthiran for Pandiya Naadu, and Narasimhan, who was a part of the cast of Kutti Puli (2013), were signed as the other two antagonists apart from Kiran. Prinz Nithik was signed to play the role of one of the gangsters in the film.

=== Filming ===
After a small delay due to last minute scripting issues, the film's principal photography commenced on 4 March 2015 at a house set in Chennai where Senthoora Poove (1988) was significantly shot. Few portions of the film were shot at the Avadi military camp in early April 2015. Vishal and Soori along with a few fighters participated in a fight sequence in a mill near Sithalapakkam in late April 2015. By 21 April 2015, 40 days of shooting was completed which covered close to 60% of the film. It included some talkie portions, a song, and a fight sequence. The film's unit camped in Madurai for 35 days starting from mid-May 2015 and Suseenthiran revealed that the entire filming process except for three songs would be completed with that schedule.

Nikita Thukral's item number was shot in Binny Mills in Chennai, which was choreographed by Shobi and filmed for over five days. The film's third schedule began on 2 May 2015 at Chennai. The climax stunt sequences were shot in mid May 2015 which Vishal termed as one of the toughest ones in Suseenthiran's films. In late June 2015, a folk song sequence was shot on Vishal, Kajal and others at Karaikudi and its surrounding locations for three days. Days later, a romantic song was shot on Vishal and Kajal at Pollachi and its surrounding locales. Upon its completion, the film's unit filmed a few talkie portions at the East Coast Road in Chennai. The last song of the film was shot near Mahabalipuram for four days commencing from 26 June 2015.

Vishal gifted 300 gold coins to the film's unit after the principal photography was wrapped up on 1 July 2015. The shooting was culminated with the traditional pumpkin breaking ritual on 4 July 2015. According to Vishal, Paayum Puli was shot in 75 working days.

== Music ==
The official soundtrack of Paayum Puli was composed by D. Imman, the lyrics of which were written by Vairamuthu. The album contained five tracks and the karaoke versions of three of them. The song "Silukku Marame" was released as a single track on 3 August 2015 at Prasad Labs in Chennai. The soundtrack was released on 15 August 2015 at Sathyam cinemas, Chennai, with the presence of the film's cast and crew.

== Release ==
In early April 2015, Vishal announced that the film would be released worldwide on 17 September 2015 on the eve of Vinayagar Chathurthi. It clashed with Puli, whose release was postponed from 15 August 2015 to 17 September 2015 due to post-production delays. Upon the completion of the film's shoot, the makers announced that the film's release had been advanced to 4 September 2015. Escape Artists Motion Pictures acquired the film's Tamil Nadu theatrical distribution rights in mid July 2015 for an undisclosed reasonable price. The satellite rights of the film were sold to Sun TV.

The theatrical trailer with a duration of more than 100 seconds was released on 15 August 2015, and received a positive response. In early August 2015, Javvaji Ramanjaneyulu acquired the rights to the film's Telugu version, which was titled Jayasurya. The first look poster of Jayasurya was launched on 8 August 2015 at Hyderabad. A few stills of the film, particularly featuring the lead pair, were released on 27 August 2015.

=== Financial issues ===
On 27 August 2015, the Tamil Nadu Theatre Owners Association announced the stalling of the film's release, citing Vendhar Movies' inability to compensate the losses incurred by the distributors from North and South Arcot, Chengalpet and Trichy due to Lingaa (2014), adding that only half of the promised settlement had been reached in aggregate. However, the Tamil Film Producers Council stated that the matter would be brought to the notice of Tamil Nadu's state government to resolve the issue in a democratic way if the exhibitors did not withdraw the red card.

Four days later, the Producer's Council lodged a complaint with the Chennai police against the distributor Singaravelan, who, along with a few other theatre owners, announced the stalling of the film's release. In the complaint letter handed over to the city commissioner, the council alleged that Singaravelan had been paid the compensation amount, and that he had made this announcement at the last minute to acquire more money from Vendhar Movies. The council later announced that it would halt the release of any new film across all languages in Tamil Nadu until the issue was resolved.

After holding a meeting with the council, Vishal confirmed that Paayum Puli would have a simultaneous release in both Tamil and Telugu on 4 September 2015 as scheduled. Around 300 to 450 screens across Tamil Nadu were allotted to Paayum Puli. Vishal and Madhan of Escape Artists held a meeting with the distributors in Chengalpet area, who withdrew the red card after a financial settlement. Due to the lateness of the settlement, screening was delayed at Chengalpet. More than 300 screens throughout Andhra Pradesh and Telangana were allotted to Jayasurya.

== Reception ==
The film received mixed reviews from critics.

M. Suganth of The Times of India rated the film 3 out of 5 and opined that Paayum Puli "lacks the tautness of Pandiya Naadu", but "packs in enough thrills to keep us glued to our seats". Kirubhakar Purushothaman of India Today rated it 2.5 out of 5 and wrote, "When the movie ends...you won't have much to complain about nor to praise. But, in future if someone says a film is like Paayum Puli, you will surely go to that film" and added that the film was "likely to become his (Suseenthiran) seventh medal in his collection of quality movies". Srivathsan Nadadhur of The Hindu wrote that Paayum Puli "revels in being an old fashioned product" and added, "Given the sincerity of its efforts and the honesty with which the director Suseenthiran leaves his inimitable stamp in a commercial exterior, it takes its own sweet time to register an impact, but when it does, the film's solidity shows up".

Sudhir Srinivasan of The Hindu wrote, "For a filmmaker who chose such an atypical beginning, why he goes on to take recourse in a super-typical love angle, only he will know. And then, the twist comes, and you finally get something to be interested in when Jayaseelan finds himself in a cat-and-mouse game with I-can't-tell-you". He added, "Without these ugly distractions, the story would have been much more gripping, and Suseenthiran would’ve had a lot more time to dwell on the villain's descent into evil". Behindwoods gave the film 2.75 out of 5 stars and stated, "With a strong climax and a concrete closure to the story, Paayum Puli declares a clear statement". Criticising the pace of the first half and the characterisations, the reviewer wrote "Hero always getting to be the smartest, heroine being a docile, fun-loving person is all an age-old template. Etching characters with depth could have brought in impact to the narration". Karthik Keramalu of CNN-IBN gave the film 3 out of 5 stars and stated, "Paayum Puli finally ends up as a film you’re angry at because it could have gone up several scales but is okay with taking a seat somewhere in the middle". IANS gave the film 3 out of 5 stars and stated that Paayum Puli "sadly reduces itself to a police drama that fizzles out even before it starts to get impressive". IndiaGlitz gave the film 2.5 out of 5 stars as well and stated, "Suseenthiran has chosen an emotional action story about brothers on both sides of the law pitted against one another which could have had the audiences at the edge of their seats, but his own screenplay is contrived and lacks the grip that his other movies are famous for" and concluded that Paayum Puli is "worth watching for Vishal's action and Samuthirakani's acting".

Sify called Paayum Puli a "predictable concoction of a cop story mixed with brother sentiments and the usual commercial trappings of Tamil cinema" and opined that the romance between the lead pair "sticks out like a sore thumb". Latha Srinivasan, writing for Daily News and Analysis, rated the film 2.5 out of 5 and criticised the film's script and the romance between Vishal and Kajal in the film, calling it "extremely insipid and badly written". She concluded that the film can be watched only if the viewer was a fan of either Vishal or Samuthirakani. Anupama Subramaniam of Deccan Chronicle too gave the film 2.5 out of 5 stars and stated, "With plenty of action and criminals waiting to be apprehended, Paayum Puli is a pure entertainer, but a weak script will leave you wondering and wandering". S. Saraswathi of Rediff.com gave 2 out of 5 stars and stated that the film "lacks the subtlety, intrigue and clarity that we have come to associate with director Suseenthiran".

Velraj's cinematography is deft and Imam's music fits the bill. Vishal's performance leaves a strong impact. Watch him balance action and sentiment and carry them on his shoulders with ease. Samuthirikaran and Soori have a good amount of screenspace, the former more effective in delivering the goods as he gets a big share in the pie. Murli Sharma, Harish Utthaman, RK and others do their parts well. Jayasurya may be watched for Vishal's verve-filled performance.
