= Action (2019 film) =

2019 film by Sundar C

- Theatrical release poster
- Directed by: Sundar C
- Screenplay by: Sundar C; Venkat Ragavan; Subha
- Dialogues by: Subha; Badri
- Story by: Sundar C
- Produced by: R. Ravindran
- Starring: Vishal; Tamannaah Bhatia
- Cinematography: Dudley
- Edited by: N. B. Srikanth
- Music by: Hiphop Tamizha
- Production company: Trident Arts
- Release date: 15 November 2019
- Running time: 158 minutes
- Country: India
- Language: Tamil
- Budget: ₹100 crore
- Box office: est.₹23.32 crore

Action is a 2019 Indian Tamil-language action thriller film directed by Sundar C and produced by Trident Arts. The film stars Vishal and Tamannaah Bhatia, alongside Kabir Duhan Singh, Aishwarya Lekshmi, Ramki, Chaya Singh, Yogi Babu and Akanksha Puri. The music was composed by Hiphop Tamizha, while cinematography and editing were handled by Dudley and N. B. Srikanth respectively. The film marks Aishwarya Lekshmi's debut in Tamil cinema and Vishal's second collaboration with Sundar after Aambala and Bhatia after Kaththi Sandai. It was released on 15 November 2019 and failed at the box office.

== Plot ==
Subhash is a Col in the Indian Army, whose father is the retired CM of Tamil Nadu, and is now succeeded by his elder son Saravanan. Subhash calls his whole family along with his lover, Meera for a short trip. During a campaign involving the Prime Ministerial candidate Guptaji, Saravanan finds out that his friend Deepak has fled after extracting ₹40 crore on loan. Saravanan calls Deepak, who tells him to leave the ceremony.

On the other hand, Subhash tries to converse with Meera during the campaign and sends her a message. Realizing that she left her phone in the car, Meera goes to the parking lot, where her phone gets exchanged with that of a killer. After noting the killer duo's vehicle number, Meera tries to escape but gets attacked and brutally stomped to death by a woman disguised as a cop. Retrieving the phone, the woman gives a call to the cell bomb placed in a cooler at the stage. The bomb goes off, killing Guptaji and knocking down Saravanan and his family.

Subhash gets shattered to find Meera's corpse, while Saravanan gets framed for the assassination with the help of Deepak. Having recorded a conversation with Deepak, Saravanan calls for a press conference at his house amidst violent protests, but is found hanging in his room thus making the media believe that he was involved. Subhash finds out about the killer woman through the vehicle number Meera noted on her palm. Looking at the tattoo on her neck in the CCTV footage at the vehicle store and her phone's screen, Subhash manages to track her and finds that she is Kaira, a London-based assassin.

Subhash, with the help of a hacker Jack, manages to trace Kaira and fights off her henchmen and kill her by hanging her in the same way she hanged Saravanan to death. Later, Subhash arrives in Istanbul and is joined by his brother-in-law Maya Kannan and friend Lt Diya. Targeting Deepak's account, they plan to extract the money. The mission goes as planned and Subhash retrieves the money from Deepak's account. However, the trio traces Deepak's location and finds him in Algornia, where they find him dead and a chase ensues, resulting in a heroic escape.

Subhash realises a person, posing as a blind man, has killed Deepak and framed him. They find that the person is the police commissioner of Turkish Police Service. Using Diya as a bait, Subhash lures the commissioner and his henchmen into a trap and fights them off, where he threatens to kill the commissioner, who then reveals that Syed Ibrahim Malik, a Pakistan-based terrorist is the real conspirator behind the explosion.

With the help of his Lt Gen. Rehman, Subhash decides to bring Malik to India on his own, where Diya accompanies him. They reach Lahore illegally, where a covert operative Imran Khaleel introduces him to Malik's location and armed forces. Learning of Malik's daughter's wedding, Diya enters the house with a fake ID card during the celebrations and secretly drops flammable balls, which led to a fire accident during the sunrise. Malik is ordered by the Pakistan Army Gen. Tahir Iqbal to accompany his officers to a safe house. Using the opportunity, Subhash chases after the vehicle and successfully takes Malik hostage.

Following a car chase, Subhash manages to escape, while Diya and Imran wait for him at the airport, but Malik is left in the car. Tahir admits Malik to a hospital, where he realises it is Malik's body double, who was ordered by Malik to accompany Tahir's army due to being held on gunpoint by Subhash. The two engage in hand-to-hand combat, following which Subash captured him. Disguised, Subhash and his gang board the plane before Tahir orders to stop it after the airport authorities identify Subhash.

The flight to India is stopped and Tahir rushes inside, only to realise that Subhash and his team took off in a flight to Nepal. Landing in Nepal, Subhash hands over Malik to the Indian Army. In a post-credits scene, During the posthumous honouring of Saravanan, more conspirators including Saravanan's senior and ex-PM candidate Varma are arrested and it is also revealed that Subhash killed Malik during a staged escape.

== Cast ==
- Vishal as Col Subash, Indian Army Intelligence officer and Saravanan's younger brother
- Tamannaah Bhatia as Lt Diya, Subhash's partner & second love interest (Voice dubbed by Ishwarya)
- Kabir Duhan Singh in a dual role as
  - Syed Ibrahim Malik, a dangerous wanted international terrorist.
  - Syed Muhammad Malik, a body double.
- Akanksha Puri as Kaira, a professional killer (Voice dubbed by Sakshi Agarwal)
- Aishwarya Lekshmi as Meera, Subhash's first love interest
- Ramki as Saravanan, Deputy Chief Minister of Tamil Nadu, Subhash's elder brother
- Chaya Singh as Kayalvizhi, Saravanan's wife
- Arav Chowdharry as Imran Khaleel, an Indian agent in Pakistan
- Sayaji Shinde as Lt Gen. Rehman, Subash's chief
- Shah Ra as Maya Kannan, Subash's brother-in-law
- Yogi Babu as Jack, an Indian hacker
- Rajasri Nair as Subhash's sister
- Pala. Karuppiah as Chief Minister of Tamil Nadu, Subash's father
- Vincent Asokan as Deepak Mehta, Saravanan's friend
- Bharath Reddy as Bharath Rao, police officer and Subhash's friend
- Ashwanth Ashokkumar as Ashwanth, Kayalvizhi's son
- Yuri Suri as Tahir Iqbal, Pakistan army general
- Ravi Venkatraman as commissioner
- Amin Hajee as Central Home Minister

Cameo appearance

- Sundar C as a passer-by

== Music ==
Action

Soundtrack album by Hiphop Tamizha
- Released: 30 October 2019
- Recorded: 2019
- Genre: Feature film soundtrack
- Length: 19:29
- Language: Tamil
- Label: Muzik 247
- Producer: Hiphop Tamizha

Hiphop Tamizha chronology
Comali (2019)	Action (2019)	Naan Sirithal (2020)

External audio
- Action Audio Jukebox on YouTube

The film's music was composed by Hiphop Tamizha, who had previously collaborated with Vishal and Sundar C on Aambala. The album features five tracks, all of which were released as singles before the full album was released on 30 October 2019.

Track listing
No.	Title	Lyrics	Singer(s)	Length
1.	"Nee Sirichalum"	Pa. Vijay	Sadhana Sargam, Jonita Gandhi, Srinisha Jayaseelan	4:39
2.	"Lights Camera Action"	Hiphop Tamizha, Paul B Sailus	Kaushik Krish, Rajan Chelliah, Hiphop Tamizha, Paul B. Sailus	3:02
3.	"Maula Maula"	Pa. Vijay	Nikhita Gandhi, Kutle Khan, Bamba Bakya	3:52
4.	"Azhage"	Hiphop Tamizha	Nakul Abhyankar	4:50
5.	"Fiyah Fiyah"	Hiphop Tamizha, Navz47, Arivu	Navz47	3:07
Total length:				19:29

== Release ==
=== Theatrical ===
Action was theatrically released worldwide on 15 November 2019.

=== Home media ===
Amazon Prime Video began streaming the film from 16 December 2019. The film was released on DVD in Japan on 4 November 2020, and the Hindi-dubbed version was released on YouTube by Goldmines Telefilms on 4 October 2020.

== Reception ==
=== Critical response ===
Action received mixed reviews from critics.

The Times of India gave 2.5/5 stars and wrote "A handful of action set pieces, set in exotic locales, strung together by a semblance of a plot." Sreedhar Pillai for Firstpost gave 2/5 stars and wrote "If only the film had a script with some logic and was a bit racier, it could have been a time pass entertainer". Sify gave 2/5 stars and said, "Action is a below-average action thriller from Sundar C- Vishal combo."

Baradwaj Rangan wrote for Film Companion, "Like any self-respecting popcorn entertainer, there are OTT moments aplenty. Killer mehndi cones? Bring ’em on, but there’s always a little surprise around the corner." Anjana Shekhar of The News Minute wrote "The film jumps, rolls and air flips from one chase-action sequence to another of which just a couple of them are memorable." S. Srivatsan of The Hindu wrote "Sundar C wants his film to retain the international-ness of the Mission Impossible series, but its tone-deaf attitude doesn’t even cross the Mayavaram border."

=== Box office ===
Action grossed ₹7.7 crore in Tamil Nadu, ₹4 crore in Andhra Pradesh and Telangana, and $82 thousand (₹57 lakh (Note: Calculated using an approximate average exchange rate of 70 INR per USD in 2019)) from overseas during its theatrical run. Subsequently, the Madras High Court directed Vishal to compensate Trident Arts for the financial losses incurred from Action. Vishal had committed to covering any shortfall if the film did not earn ₹20 crore, but it grossed less than ₹12 crore. Despite agreeing to make another film, Chakra, as compensation, Vishal produced it under his own banner. The court allowed Chakra to release on streaming and ordered Vishal to provide a guarantee of ₹8.29 crore for the losses.
