= Madha Gaja Raja =

2025 film by Sundar C

- Theatrical release poster
- Directed by: Sundar C
- Screenplay by: Sundar C Venkat Raghavan
- Story by: Sundar C
- Dialogues by: Venkat Raghavan
- Produced by: Akkineni Manohar Prasad; Akkineni Anand Prasad; A. C. Shanmugam; A. C. S. Arun Kumar
- Starring: Vishal; Santhanam; Anjali; Varalaxmi Sarathkumar
- Cinematography: Richard M. Nathan
- Edited by: Praveen K. L. N. B. Srikanth
- Music by: Vijay Antony
- Production companies: Gemini Film Circuit; Benzz Media (presents)
- Distributed by: Vishal Film Factory; Phars Film
- Release date: 12 January 2025
- Running time: 155 minutes
- Country: India
- Language: Tamil
- Budget: ₹15 crore
- Box office: ₹75 crore

Madha Gaja Raja (/məðəˈɡədʒəˈrɑːdʒɑː/ transl. King of Musth Elephants) (Note: Also the title character.) is a 2025 Indian Tamil-language action comedy film written and directed by Sundar C and produced by Gemini Film Circuit and Benzz Media. The film stars Vishal in the titular role, alongside Santhanam, Anjali, Varalaxmi Sarathkumar, Sonu Sood, Manivannan, Subbaraju, Nithin Sathya, Sadagoppan Ramesh, Munna Simon and John Kokken.

The film was officially announced untitled in February 2012 and the official title was announced in April, with Karthika Nair joining as the lead actress. Principal photography began the following month in Chennai. However, after script alterations, Nair left and was replaced by Anjali and Varalaxmi. Subsequent schedules were held in Palani, Jaipur, Hyderabad and Australia between June 2012 and January 2013. The music was composed by Vijay Antony, with cinematography handled by Richard M. Nathan and editing by Praveen K. L. and N. B. Srikanth.

Originally intended for a January 2013 release, Madha Gaja Raja was delayed for 12 years due to legal and financial troubles, before releasing on 12 January 2025. The film, despite its delayed release, was a box office success and emerged the ninth highest-grossing Tamil film of 2025.

== Plot ==
The film starts with a relay race between two group of students. Teacher Dhandapani's team wins the race, but not without some foul play.

Several years later, in Chinna Anaikatti, Madha Gaja Raja assumes his father Inspector Srinivasan's responsibility to protect Theekuchi Thirumugam and his daughter Madhavi from thugs hired by Shanmugapandi and citing safety Raja makes them stay at his residence. Raja and Madhavi fall in love, but Srinivasan insults Thirumugam. Angered, Madhavi and Thirumugam leave the village when Raja is away.

Kalyanasundaram, owner of Goodbye Travels, is facing marital issues as his wife, Gayathri, influenced by her mother, is seeking divorce, citing Kalyanasundaram's failure to disclose his mortuary van service business before marriage. Kalyanasundaram invites both women to attend his school teacher's daughter's wedding. En route, they meet Shanmugam, Ramesh (a sub-collector) and Raja – the winning team from the relay race. Maya is Ramesh's sister-in-law who seems to like Raja.

Dhandapani is thrilled to reunite with his estranged brother-in-law Pedha Perumal, by accepting his son as the groom for his daughter, who is actually in love with her cousin. Raja convinces Dhandapani to allow his daughter to marry her cousin and also fights off Pedha Perumal's son who tries to stop the wedding. Raja and his friend Dickey David and stage a play to help reconcile Kalyanasundaram with Gayathri. The team that lost the relay race asks for a rematch, and Raja intentionally loses the race to make the other team happy.

Ramesh reveals that he has been falsely suspended and imprisoned on bribery charges. This, he believes, is revenge by Karukuvel Vishwanath, a powerful media baron, for sealing his pharmaceutical company, which produced drugs that killed 18 children. Sathya shares his struggles in the handloom business, where a fire accident destroyed his shipments. The insurance claim money he received barely covered the damage to a nearby pharmaceutical company, which Ramesh had previously sealed. Ramesh and Sathya suspect Vishwanath's involvement in the fire mishap and Raja vows to resolve their issues.

Raja meets Vishwanath in Chennai and demands compensation for the losses incurred but Vishwanath asserts that Raja won't be able to obtain a single penny. Vishwanath, in collusion with Minister Nallamuthu, falsely accuses Raja and the auto driver whom Raja befriended earlier of drug peddling. However, the auto driver voluntarily confesses to the crime, securing Raja's release. Raja redirects auto drivers to target the corrupt Inspector Shankar, who had arrested him.

Raja discovers that the auto driver's landlady is Madhavi, who refuses to let Raja stay. However, with the help of his friends, Raja manages to accommodate. Vishwanath gets his men to kill Nallamuthu in an attempt to usurp Nallamuthu's ministry. He tries to frame Raja for the murder. But Raja and Kalyanasundaram devise a plan, using Nallamuthu's corpse to create the illusion that he is still alive. They successfully escape with the corpse and Vishwanath believes that Nallamuthu is indeed still alive. During Vishwanath's swearing-in ceremony, a video exposing his henchman's murder of Nallamuthu is broadcast, prompting the ceremony's cancellation.

Meanwhile, Vishwanath orchestrates a caste riot and also plans a procession to protest the martyrs of the caste riot. Furthermore, he plots an accident to kill Ramesh. Suspecting foul play, Raja rushes to Madurai. He captures Vishwanath's assistant, who reveals that the procession is a ruse to transport Vishwanath's black money to the Tuticorin port. Raja escapes with one of the vans loaded with black money, while the villagers divert Vishwanath's party members. Ultimately, Raja and Vishwanath engage in an intense confrontation, culminating in Raja's triumph over Vishwanath. Vishwanath is arrested, Ramesh is exonerated and reinstated as Sub-Collector, and the government reimburses Shanmugam and the weavers for their losses.

== Cast ==
- Vishal as Madha Gaja "Raja" (MGR)
- Santhanam as Kalyanasundaram
- Anjali as Madhavi
- Varalaxmi Sarathkumar as Maya
- Sonu Sood as Karukuvel Vishwanath
- Nithin Sathya as Shanmugam
- Sadagoppan Ramesh as Ramesh, Sub Collector
- Manivannan (Note: Posthumous release; film dedicated to his memory) as an auto driver
- R. Sundarrajan as Inspector Srinivasan
- Manobala as Minister Nallamuthu
- Raj Kapoor as Inspector Shankar
- Vichu Vishwanath as a politician
- Rajendran as Viswanath's henchman
- Sharat Saxena as Dhandapani Master
- Chitti Babu as Vishwanath's PA
- Swaminathan as 'Theekuchi' Thirumugam
- Sudha as Jaya
- Gayathri Rao as Gayathri, Kalyanasundaram's Wife
- Satya Krishnan as Ramesh's wife
- Subbaraju as Rajesh
- Munna Simon as Viswanath's henchman
- John Kokken as Pedha Perumal's son
- Ajay Rathnam as Pedha Perumal
- Nellai Siva as a politician
- Lollu Sabha Manohar as a cab driver
- K. S. Jayalakshmi as Kalyanasundaram's mother-in-law
- Shakeela as a marriage attendee
- Muthukaalai as Rajesh's teammate
- Yuvina Parthavi as Oviya, Kalyanasundaram's daughter
- Chelladurai as a constable
- Manager Cheena as a constable
- Uma Padmanabhan as a Judge
- S. N. Parvathy as Grandmother
- Usha Elizabeth as the auto driver's wife
- Lollu Sabha Easter as Rajesh's teammate
- Arya as 'Dickey' David in a guest appearance
- Sadha as a doctor

== Production ==
Director Sundar C and actor Vishal announced that they would work together on a project in early 2012, and it was revealed that Vishal would portray a triple role in the film. After denying reports that the female lead role was first offered to Shruti Haasan, Sundar hinted that they were set to sign on Hansika Motwani, but her busy schedule left her unavailable to commit dates for the project. Titled Madha Gaja Raja, after Vishal's three characters, Karthika Nair eventually joined as the lead actress during April 2012. The film subsequently began production in Chennai during early May 2012, with a song shot featuring Vishal alongside Sadha, who was revealed to be making an appearance in an item number.

Soon after production began, Sundar chose to alter the script, with the new version having Vishal in a single role, and two leading actresses instead of one. Disappointed with this development, Nair left the project, feeling her role had been significantly diminished as a result of the storyline changes. Taapsee Pannu signed on to replace her, but soon afterwards left the project citing date clashes with her commitments for the promotional activity of another film. Varalaxmi Sarathkumar was consequently signed on after working with producers Gemini Film Circuit in their previous venture Podaa Podi (2012), while Anjali was selected for the main female lead role. The team subsequently began another schedule with the new storyline in Palani during June 2012.

The team moved to Jaipur during August 2012 to complete another schedule, while Vishal revealed that the title now referred to the agitated state of Lord Ganesha rather than the names of his characters, stating that "Gaja Raja" could be literally translated as fury. During the particular schedule, Vishal suffered an injury when filming a fight scene and was forced to take a week's break from working. The film's shoot moved to Hyderabad during September 2012, with Arya joining the team's cast to shoot for a guest appearance. Arya had flown in from Chennai and completed his work on the film within a single day. The team later shot in Australia. By January 2013, the film was complete as Sundar had moved on to other projects.

== Music ==
The music was composed by Vijay Antony in his first collaboration with Sundar and second with Vishal after Vedi (2011). Vishal made his singing debut with "My Dear Loveru", which was released as a single on 24 December 2012. Karthik of Milliblog said, "Chikku bukku could well be a standard Ilayaraja song but for the gibberish and guitar that Vijay Antony inserts at places – folksy and catchy". He added, "My Dear Loveru tells us that Vishal should not have attempted singing and that Pa.Vijay shouldn’t have attempted lyrics for this headache of a song". Karthik described "Nee Dhana" as "standard techno", but appreciated "Sattru Mun Varai" for Santhosh Hariharan's vocals, even if the song was "regimental stuff". He added, "Thumbakki thumbai is a curious combination of interesting, meaningless words and exotic sounds – manages to stand out" and concluded that the album was "Standard masala fare".

Track listing
No.	Title	Lyrics	Singer(s)	Length
1.	"Chikku Bukku"	Annamalai	Chinnaponnu, Prabhu Pandala	04:26
2.	"My Dear Loveru"	Pa. Vijay	Vishal, Vijay Antony	04:24
3.	"Nee Dhana Nee Dhana"	Pa. Vijay	Vijay Antony	04:35
4.	"Sattru Mun Varai"	Annamalai	Santhosh Hariharan	05:27
5.	"Thumbakki Thumbai"	Pa. Vijay	Vijay Antony	04:17
Total length:				23:09

== Release ==
=== Theatrical ===
Promotional campaigns for Madha Gaja Raja started in November 2012, with an initial release window of Pongal (mid-January 2013) announced by Gemini Film Circuit. However, Vishal's other film Samar had been long-delayed and it's makers wanted to release the film on the same date, and the actor tried to ensure both films did not clash. As a result, Madha Gaja Raja was put on hold until the release of Samar. Furthermore, the failure of Kadal (2013), which Gemini Film Circuit had co-produced and distributed, also affected the financial prospects of the company and distributors of the film wanted compensation before Madha Gaja Raja was released.

After nine months of little information about the project, the producers announced their intentions of releasing the film on 9 September 2013 to coincide with the festival of Ganesh Chaturthi. However, the plans were put on hold after an Australian national named Santhanam successfully appealed for a court injunction to stop the film's release in September 2013. He claimed that Gemini Film Circuit had agreed to pay him a sum of ₹6 million (equivalent to ₹11 million or US$120,000 in 2026) for his services of providing production facilities during the team's schedule in Australia but had failed to make the payment. Under financial restraints, Gemini Film Circuit had also sold on the film to Vishal's newly launched production studio, Vishal Film Factory, but failed to inform Vishal of the outstanding payment which had to be made to Santhanam. The High Court subsequently had put a stay order on the release of the film until the issue was sorted.

Vishal took up the responsibility in trying to release the film but was unsuccessful. He later disassociated from the film and Gemini Film Circuit acquired the film again from the actor. P. T. Selvakumar contemplated purchasing the film's distributing rights and planned to release the film on 7 March 2014, but the idea was dropped. Sundar and Vishal subsequently moved on to finish and release another film together during the period of delay, Aambala (2015). In November 2015, Vishal reportedly pledged that he would take action to release the film by December 2015, although it did not happen. Plans to release the film on 29 April 2016 also failed.

In 2024, Sundar said he did not understand why the film was still unreleased and mentioned himself and Vishal having requested the production company to sell the distribution rights to them. In January 2025, it was announced that the film would release on 12 January that month, during the Pongal weekend. The film subsequently premiered on 11 January and had a wide release the next day. A Telugu-dubbed version with the same title was released on 31 January 2025.

=== Home media ===
As of November 2026, the film is yet to be available on any streaming service due to alleged logistical issues.

== Reception ==
=== Critical response ===
M Suganth of The Times of India gave 3/5 stars and wrote "Madha Gaja Raja might not rank among his best works, Ullathai Allitha and Kalakalappu, but this is still an OG film that deserves what's now become a promotional mantra: 'Fight venuma fight irukku, dance venuma dance irukku, romance venuma romance irukku, glamour venuma glamour irukku, comedy venuma comedy irukku...'" (transl. If you want fights, there are fights. If you want dance, there is dance ...). (Note: Based on Dil Raju's speech at Varisu's audio launch.) A critic of Dinamalar gave 3/5 stars.

Avinash Ramachandran of The Indian Express gave 2.5/5 stars and wrote "The laughs keep on coming, and it is a terrific mix of nostalgia and wistful thinking about the times that were that makes us throw our weights behind this Vishal-Santhanam film, directed by Sundar C." Janani K of India Today gave 2.5/5 stars and wrote "Madha Gaja Raja, even though outdated and politically incorrect, manages to bring much-needed laughs as it reminds you of the good old days when all you needed was a comedy film to unwind." Anusha Sundar of OTTPlay gave 2.5/5 stars and wrote "Sundar C and Vishal's film is entertaining as long as you are an audience of good old Tamil cinema days where jokes stemmed out from unawareness. It might not suit the sensibilities of today's times, yet cannot be ruled out for it evokes some quips that films today rarely do."

Sreejith Mullappilly of Cinema Express gave 2/5 stars and wrote "there is inarguably an entertaining first half in Madha Gaja Raja, with Santhanam delivering some big laughs amidst the duds [...] Vishal has done many sequences, actions and others, that are all about flaunting his stardom. While the action is mostly enjoyable, the fight at the end goes on a bit too long and makes the film rather anticlimactic." Bhuvanesh Chandar of The Hindu wrote, "perhaps most of what glitters about Madha Gaja Raja isn't the film itself, but the mindless fun of watching something that as a whole could only exist in your past. It's nothing more than a could-have-been that has somehow become a has-been." Sivashankar of Dinamani felt that the film, despite being made a decade ago, was still entertaining, but criticised the body shaming jokes and suggestive dialogues.

=== Box office ===
As of late January 2025, the film grossed approximately ₹50 crore (equivalent to ₹52 crore or US$5.4 million in 2026). The film ultimately concluded its run with its worldwide gross estimated to be ₹75 crore (equivalent to ₹77 crore or US$8.0 million in 2026).

== Impact ==
Following the success of Madha Gaja Raja, theatre owner and distributor Tirupur Subramaniam confirmed there were discussions about releasing other high-profile Tamil films which had completed filming but remain unreleased. One such film was Badava (2025), which was released six years after it had completed filming.
