= Poojai =

2014 Indian film by Hari

- Theatrical release poster
- Directed by: Hari
- Written by: Hari
- Produced by: Vishal
- Starring: Vishal; Shruthi Haasan; Sathyaraj; Radhika; Mukesh Tiwari; Soori
- Cinematography: Priyan
- Edited by: V. T. Vijayan; T. S. Jay
- Music by: Yuvan Shankar Raja
- Production company: Vishal Film Factory
- Distributed by: Vendhar Movies
- Release date: 22 October 2014
- Running time: 158 minutes
- Country: India
- Language: Tamil

Poojai (transl. Prayer) is a 2014 Indian Tamil-language action drama film directed by Hari and produced by Vishal. The film stars Vishal, alongside Shruti Haasan, Sathyaraj, Radhika Sarathkumar, Mukesh Tiwari, Awadesh Mishra and Soori. Yuvan Shankar Raja composed the music, while cinematography and editing were handled by Priyan and V. T. Vijayan.

Principal photography began on 18 April 2014.

Poojai was released on 22 October 2014, on the occasion of Diwali, to mixed reviews from critics. The film was remade in Kannada as Anjani Putra (2017).

== Plot ==
Vasudevan "Vasu" is the heir of Kovai Group, a cloth manufacturing company in Coimbatore. Due to a misunderstanding, he gets disowned by his mother and the matriarch of his joint family, Rajalakshmi. Years later, Vasu works as a moneylender and lives a normal life with his friends Kutti Puli and Pandi, where he also falls in love with a rich girl named Divya. At a theatre, Vasu saves a newly transferred ADSP Sivakkozhundhu and his wife from a group of North Indian killers who work for Anna Thandavam, a Pollachi-based businessman and hitman, as Sivakkozhundhu was transferred to investigate Anna Thandavam's client case.

Anna Thandavam also plans to illegally grab land from a village temple, which was planned to be gifted by Vasu's late father Rathnaswamy. These two incidents cause enmity between Vasu and Anna Thandavam. When the land is formally gifted to the temple, an irate Anna Thandavam orders his henchman to assault Vasu's uncle Ramaswamy. Rajalakshmi realizes her mistake of misunderstanding Vasu and reunites with him. Vasu learns about the incident and thrashes Anna Thandavam's henchmen and breaks his hand. Anna Thandavam tries to attack Vasu, but Vasu brutally thrashes him in full view of the public, which goes viral online.

Assisted by Sivakkozhundhu and Divya, Vasu subdues Anna Thandavam's attempts to destroy his family by capturing the North Indian killers, leading to an arrest warrant for Anna Thandavam. During the temple festival, Anna Thandavam's second wife kills Rajalakshmi with a venomous knife, while Anna Thandavam rushes to Patna. Learning of Rajalakshmi's death, Vasu rushes to Patna and tracks down Anna Thandavam and his hitman friend Rai Bahadur, where he brutally finishes them, thus avenging Rajalakshmi's death. Vasu returns home to mourn Rajalakshmi's death with Divya and his family.

== Cast ==
- Vishal as Vasudevan "Vasu"
- Shruti Haasan as Divya "D", Vasu's love interest
- Sathyaraj as ADSP Sivakkozhundhu
- Radhika as Rajalakshmi, Vasu's mother
- Soori as Kutti Puli
- Mukesh Tiwari as Anna Thandavam
- Jayaprakash as Ramaswamy, Vasudevan's first younger paternal uncle
- Thalaivasal Vijay as Kumaraswamy, Vasudevan's second younger paternal uncle
- Prathap Pothen as Divya's father
- Janaki Sabesh as Divya's mother
- Awadhesh Mishra as Rai Bahadur
- Madhumila as Selvi
- Abhinaya as Durga
- Aishwarya as Lakshmi, Sivakkozhundu's wife
- Sithara as Ramaswamy's wife
- Kausalya as Susheela, Kumaraswamy's wife
- Renuka as Manimegalai, Durga's mother
- Pandi as Pandi
- Manobala as Kovai Group's Manager
- Imman Annachi as Guru
- R. Sundarrajan as a temple trustee/festival organizer
- Soundararaja as Soundar
- Santhana Bharathi as Anna Thandavam's lawyer
- O. A. K. Sundar as Durga's father
- Karate Raja as Selvaraj, Anna Thandavam's henchman
- Pondy Ravi as Sundaram, Anna Thandavam's henchman
- Narsing Yadav as Rai Bahadur's henchman
- Barath Raj as Naresh Yadhav
- Nisha as Keerthi, Divya's friend
- Sabarna Anand as Chithra
- Vinay Bihari as Kerala Minister Madhavan Nair
- Aara as Aarthi, Vasu's sister
- Andrea Jeremiah in the song "Soda Bottle"

== Production ==
=== Development ===
In December 2013, Vishal told that he would produce and feature in a film which would be directed by Hari and that the pair would collaborate again after the success of their previous venture, Thaamirabharani (2007). Hari had described the film as a "triangular action story" which starts in Coimbatore and ends in Patna, while revealing Yuvan Shankar Raja had already completed composing the film's songs before production commenced. The film was officially launched on 28 March 2014, with a press release naming the film's cast and crew. Yuvan Shankar Raja was selected to compose the music for the film, while Priyan and V. T. Vijayan were confirmed to be the cinematographer and the editor of the film respectively. Shruti Hassan was also selected to do costume designing.

=== Casting ===
Early reports in December had suggested that Shruti Haasan would be signed on to play the film's heroine, though she only confirmed her participation in March 2014. Sathyaraj and Soori were added to the cast to play supporting roles, while actress Kausalya was announced to be making a comeback with the film starring alongside other supporting actresses. The team approached Rekha to play Vishal's mother in the film, but her unavailability meant that the team later cast Radhika Sarathkumar instead. Prathap Pothen and Janaki Sabesh were also selected to play Shruti Haasan's parents. Andrea Jeremiah was selected to make a cameo appearance in a folk song. Sathyaraj sported a bald look for this film thanks to his simultaneous shoot for S. S. Rajamouli's Baahubali (2015) and his role was said to be "very powerful" and also the "suspense element of the film". Bhojpuri actor Awadhesh Mishra was selected to play a gangster in the film which marks his debut in Tamil cinema. Vaibhav Reddy was selected for an important role in the film, but his role was not a part of the film. Vinay Bihari, who is the Youth, Arts and Culture Minister of Bihar, was selected to play the role of a district collector in the film's climatic portions when he expressed his interest in acting to Hari when he was in Bihar for location scouting. Barath Raj, who has won Mr. India and the second runner up 2014 title, played a crucial role of collector's son from Bihar. Abhinaya was selected to play a supporting role, while Mukesh Tiwari was selected to play the main antagonist.

=== Filming ===
Principal photography commenced on 18 April 2014 at Chennai. During the shoot of an action sequence in a one crore worth set at Saligramam, Vishal injured his middle finger in his right hand for which 14 stitches were administered. Thus the shoot was temporarily halted. The item number featuring Vishal and Andrea Jeremiah was shot by early May in the backdrop of the Koyambedu Market in Chennai. Later, the unit proceeded to Coimbatore for filming major portions of the film. At that time, it was known that Hari planned to wrap the film's shoot in 40 working days. A fight sequence was shot in a popular mall multiplex there and scenes involving Vishal and Shruti Hassan were also shot in the mall in Coimbatore. The filming continued at Karaikudi in early July where scenes featuring the principal cast were shot. The shooting continued in hot weather making things difficult while Vishal suffered injuries for the second time in the film's shoot. He suffered a fracture during the shoot of an action sequence after trying to avoid falling on his face while he slipped from an asbestos sheet.

In the first week of August 2014, the film's climax was shot in Patna in a 10-day schedule and by then, 95% of the film's shoot was complete. The climax was said to have few risky stunts which were shot first in the final schedule. Both Vishal and Shruti Hassan carried out the risky stunts and fights by themselves. Some scenes for the climax were also shot in Golconda Fort in Hyderabad in special and enormous sets erected for the climax and a song was also shot there. On its completion, one romantic song was shot at Switzerland and the remaining fast-paced song was shot in Chennai. Vishal and Shruti Haasan completed a hard folk song sequence, which was shot in AVM facilities and choreographed by Baba Baskar. One more song sequence was also shot in Poland. On 29 September 2014, Shruti confirmed that the shooting of the film was completed.

== Music ==
Poojai

Soundtrack album by Yuvan Shankar Raja
- Released: 1 October 2014
- Recorded: 2014
- Genre: Feature film soundtrack
- Length: 23:56
- Language: Tamil
- Labels: V Music; Divo
- Producer: Yuvan Shankar Raja

Yuvan Shankar Raja chronology
Govindudu Andarivadele (2014)	Poojai (2014)	Vai Raja Vai (2014)

The soundtrack was composed by Yuvan Shankar Raja. The album consists of six tracks and Na. Muthukumar had penned the lyrics for all songs. The track list was released on 29 September 2014, while the audio launch took place on 1 October 2014 at the Loyola-ICAM College of Engineering and Technology. Vishal released the album through his newly launched music label - V Music, a subsidiary of the production house alongside Divo.

The album received mixed reviews from critics. Behindwoods gave 2.5 out of 5 stars and concluded that "Yuvan delivers what is needed for a commercial entertainer". Indiaglitz gave 2.75 out of 5 and wrote that the album was "a commercial cocktail which could have been better", and chose "Devathai", "Soda Bottle" and "Veraarum" as the album's picks.

All lyrics are written by Na. Muthukumar.

No.	Title	Singer(s)	Length
1.	"Devathai"	Nivas	4:04
2.	"Ippadiye"	Rahul Nambiar, Mili Nair	4:34
3.	"Odi Odi"	Palakkad Sreeram	4:32
4.	"Soda Bottle"	Yazin Nizar, Anthony Dasan, Sathyan	4:34
5.	"Uyire Uyire"	Yuvan Shankar Raja	2:26
6.	"Verarum Kandhirathe"	Karthik, Pooja A. V.	3:46
Total length:			23:56

== Release ==
During the film's launch, Hari stated that the film would release in October 2014 as a Deepavali release. The same was stated again in the end of July 2014.

The Tamil Nadu theatrical distribution rights were acquired by Vendhar Movies. The stills featuring Vishal and Shruti Hassan were released on 18 April 2014. The official motion poster teaser of the film was released on 1 September 2014. The official teaser of the film released on 11 September 2014. The satellite rights of the film were sold to Sun TV. The film released in over 1100 screens worldwide.

== Reception ==
=== Critical reception ===
M. Suganth of The Times of India gave 3/5 stars and wrote "Poojai is closer to Vel in Hari’s filmography — not as powerful as Saamy but at the same time, not tedious like Seval." Sify gave 3/5 stars and called it "a typical Hari mass entertainer, though this time he has not got the mix in the right proposition".

Prakash Upadhyaya of IBTimes gave 2.5/5 stars and wrote "Poojai is a pure commercial movie and watched by all section of audience." S. Saraswathi of Rediff gave 2.5/5 stars and wrote "Poojai is your standard Hari fare; there is loads of everything that we expect from him. The screenplay may not be as exciting as some of his earlier hits, but it keeps you entertained just the same."

Indiaglitz gave 2.5/5 stars and wrote "Poojai is a mix of a lot of genres, but they seem disproportionate for the times and taste of this day. However, it is an entertaining three hours of festivity, to chill out on. Most importantly, thanks to Hari for a thoroughbred masala movie after a long time in Kollywood." Behindwoods gave 2.25/5 stars and wrote "Poojai is still a watchable entertainer to spend time on, with your family on a festive day."

== Remake ==
The film was initially planned to be remade in Kannada as Ayush with Darshan, but was officially remade in Kannada as Anjani Putra (2017) by A.Harsha.
