= Kathakali (film) =

2016 Indian Tamil-language action thriller film by Pandiraj

- Theatrical release poster
- Directed by: Pandiraaj
- Written by: Pandiraaj
- Produced by: Pandiraaj; Vishal
- Starring: Vishal; Catherine Tresa
- Cinematography: Balasubramaniem
- Edited by: Pradeep E. Ragav
- Music by: Hiphop Tamizha
- Production companies: Pasanga Productions; Vishal Film Factory
- Distributed by: Sri Thenandal Films
- Release date: 14 January 2016
- Running time: 125 minutes
- Country: India
- Language: Tamil

Kathakali is a 2016 Indian Tamil-language action thriller film directed by Pandiraaj. It stars Vishal, who also co-produced the film with Pandiraaj, and Catherine Tresa. It follows a man who becomes the prime suspect in the murder of a gangster who threatened his family.

The story is based on an actual incident involving one of Pandiraaj's friends. The music was composed by Hiphop Tamizha with cinematography by Balasubramaniem and editing by Pradeep E. Ragav. Kathakali was released on 14 January 2016, during Pongal, and received positive reviews from critics. Balasubramaniem won the Tamil Nadu State Film Award for Best Cinematographer.

== Plot ==
After spending six years in the United States, Amudhavel returns to Cuddalore for his marriage to his long-time girlfriend Meenu Kutty, where he is forced to invite to his marriage a local gangster named Lakshmipathy aka Thamba, despite a previous history between them. Thamba was responsible for dragging Amudhan and his elder brother Gnanavel to prison five years ago on false charges after Gnanavel, who worked in Thamba's fishing business, decided to leave Thamba and start his own fishing business. Thamba was also responsible for chopping off the leg of Amudhan and Gnanavel's father Rajarathinam when he had tried to intervene in the fight between Thamba and his sons, confining him to a wheelchair. To escape from Thamba and his gang and not cause any more harm to his family, Amudhan had emigrated to the US.

While Amudhan is in Chennai doing wedding shopping with Meenu Kutty, he gets the news that Thamba had been killed the previous day. Unfortunately for Amudhan, he is soon suspected of murdering Thamba due to their enmity. Thamba's henchmen set Amudhan's house on fire, forcing Gnanavel and his family to go into hiding. Saravana Vadivel, a cruel and merciless police inspector, is assigned to bring Thamba's killer to justice. Since Amudhan is the prime suspect, Vadivel orders him to present himself at Cuddalore and prove his innocence, failing which he will be considered as Thamba's murderer and will be thrown into prison. Amudhan leaves for Cuddalore at midnight, with policemen heavily guarding the bus and route in which he is travelling to prevent him from escaping. Amudhan manages to escape from the police at Puducherry and meets up with Gnanavel and his family.

Amudhan and Gnanavel then leave for Cuddalore to meet Vadivel. They soon find out that Vadivel has no intention of hearing their story and is determined to throw them into prison, where they escape from Vadivel and the police. Meenu Kutty is forced to sit in the police station by Vadivel as he hopes that Amudhan will take the blame for the murder to protect his fiancé. While on the run, Amudhan finds out that Vadivel is behind Thamba's death. He then overpowers Thamba's brothers-in-law and Vadivel, as well as his teenage son, and holds them hostage to find out the truth. Vadivel had been humiliated in front of his wife by Thamba, because of which he had decided to take revenge on Thamba by sending men to kill him and then framing his death on Amudhan, since he seemed easy to frame and also because of the history between Thamba and Amudhan.

Amudhan confronts Vadivel, forcing him to reveal that he was Thamba's murderer. However, it is revealed that Thamba's brother-in-laws were also involved in the murder as they wanted to usurp Thamba's position. They then fight with Amudhan, with one of the brother-in-laws getting killed accidentally by his own man. Vadivel is also brutally attacked by Amudhan. Unfortunately for Vadivel and the other brother-in-law, Thamba's teenage son overheard their confession regarding the murder. Enraged, the son kills both his uncle and Vadivel with a metal silencer.

Amudhan narrates in a voiceover that even though Vadivel and Thamba's in-laws had plotted to kill Thamba. Amudhan, who was determined to take revenge against Thamba for the atrocities committed against him and his family, had stabbed Thamba and escaped before Vadivel's men arrived and further stabbed a dying Thamba to death.

== Cast ==
- Vishal as Amudhavel Rajarathnam "Amudhan"
- Catherine Tresa as Meenu Kutty
- Madhusudhan Rao as Lakshmipathy "Thamba" (Voiced by Samuthirakani)
- Karunas as Karpooram
- Imman Annachi as Amudhan's uncle
- Mime Gopi as Gnanavel Rajarathnam
- Sreejith Ravi as Saravana Vadivel
- Jayaprakash as Textile Mill Owner
- Pawan as Sambantham
- Lakshmi Ramakrishnan as Thamba's wife
- Shatru as Thamba's brother-in-law
- Aathma Patrick as Thamba's brother-in-law
- Grace Karunas as Kavitha
- Poster Nandakumar as Ex-MLA Vaduganathan
- D. R. K. Kiran as Thavachelvam, Amudhan's friend

== Production ==
The film's title Kathakali was announced in September 2015. Director Pandiraaj admitted that the film was unrelated to the dance form from Kerala, which he said is "all about facial expressions and hand gestures that effectively convey the background narrative rendered in musical format. The story of my film is about the various emotions and reactions of the protagonist, as he grapples with one life-changing incident after another". Vishal, the lead actor, revealed that the story was based on a true incident involving one of Pandiraaj's friends. Filming lasted 62–65 working days. Pradeep E. Ragav debuted with this film as editor.

== Soundtrack ==
The soundtrack was composed by Hiphop Tamizha. The audio launch was held on 24 December 2015. Siddharth K of Sify rated the album 3/5, stating "After a roaring Thani Oruvan, Hiphop Thamizha plays to the gallery of the movie here by sticking to the movie's demands. A romantic number, a kuthu number & couple of theme music pieces make the album crisp & to the point". Karthik of Milliblog compared "Azhagae" to the compositions of Yuvan Shankar Raja, and singer Adhi "sings the seemingly never ending tune that does away with conventional structures". He appreciated Anthony Daasan's singing in "Erangi Vandhu", which "builds its kuthu ambitions really well", and the instrumental number "Kathakali Krotham Kathakali" which uses "whistle to good effect". Karthik noted the "Kerala influences" in the periphery of another instrumental number, the "Kathakali Theme", and concluded that Hiphop Tamizha "continue to show promise in their music".

Track listing
No.	Title	Singer(s)	Length
1.	"Azhage"	Hiphop Tamizha	3:38
2.	"Kathakali Theme" (Instrumental)	–	2:37
3.	"Erangi Vandhu"	Hiphop Tamizha, Anthony Daasan	3:35
4.	"Kathakali Krotham Kathakali (The Whistle Theme)" (Instrumental)	–	1:41
Total length:			11:31

== Release ==
Kathakali was released on 14 January 2016, during Pongal. It was initially planned for Diwali 2015 but delayed due to Vishal's commitments to the Nadigar Sangam elections causing production delays. The film was distributed by Sri Thenandal Films in Tamil Nadu.

=== Reception ===
Baradwaj Rangan, writing for The Hindu, called Kathakali a "fairly watchable thriller" where "Two things help. One, the two-hour running time. Two, the focus." M Suganth of The Times of India rated the film 3 out of 5 and stated, "What is refreshing about Kathakali is that it is less an action film and more a mystery", adding, "It is in the final portions that the film slips a bit. Given that Amudhavel is played by Vishal, the character has to be an action hero and so, we see him beating up professional gangsters with hardly any effort, and the film starts to resemble conventional action films." Sify wrote, "Kathakali is a brilliantly written riveting murder mystery with engaging screenplay and crisp running time", adding that although the film's initial portions "are filled with inconspicuous love angle and friendship, the tempo rises towards the intermission and from then on, there is no looking back".

=== Box office ===
Kathakali opened at third at the Chennai box office. Sify said it had a "decent opening", and despite the film receiving "rave" reviews, attributed this less-than-stellar opening to competition from other Pongal releases and releasing in fewer screens. In its second week, however, the film jumped to second place, with Sify attributing the box-office boost to favourable word of mouth. It dropped to fifth place in the third week.
