= Vishal Film Factory =

Indian film studio

- Type: Private
- Industry: Entertainment
- Founded: 2013
- Founder: Vishal
- Headquarters: Chennai, India
- Key people: G.K Reddy; Vikram Krishna Reddy; Vishal Krishna Reddy; Aishwarya Reddy
- Products: Films; Music
- Services: Film production Film distribution Music
- Owner: Vishal
- Parent: G.K Film Corporation
- Subsidiaries: V-Music

Vishal Film Factory is an Indian film production, distribution and music company established by actor Vishal in 2013. Based in Chennai, it mainly produces and distributes Tamil films. It releases music on V-Music.

== History ==
Vishal Film Factory first produced the film Pandiya Naadu (2013) it was directed by Suseenthiran. the film features Vishal and Lakshmi Menon in the lead roles, while Bharathiraja, Soori, Vikranth, and Sharath Lohitashwa play other pivotal roles.The film was released in Hindi, and remade in Kannada.Pandiya Naadu (2013) film released more than 350+ screens in Tamil Nadu, while overseas it released in 70 screens adding up to 1000+ screens worldwide. Film collected first day opening day collection grossed ₹7.14 crore. The film received positive reviews from critics. Also the film won SIIMA Best Debutant Producer award

== Filmography ==
Key
†	Denotes films that have not yet been released

As producer

Year	Film	Cast	Director	Synopsis	Notes
2013	Pandiya Naadu	Vishal, Lakshmi Menon	Suseenthiran	Meek person masterminds to take revenge on dreaded gangster who killed his brother and friend	SIIMA Best Debutant Producer award
2014	Naan Sigappu Manithan	Vishal, Lakshmi Menon, Iniya	Thiru	A man who is suffering from narcolepsy takes revenge on people who molested his lover	
2014	Poojai	Vishal, Sathyaraj, Shruti Haasan	Hari	A man clashes with a gangster after he attacked his family	
2015	Aambala	Vishal, Prabhu, Vaibhav Reddy, Hansika Motwani	Sundar C	A man decides to find his father gets to know the secrets about his family	
2016	Kathakali	Vishal, Catherine Tresa	Pandiraj	A man decides to investigate the death of a dreaded gangster whom he was suspected of murdering	
2017	Thupparivaalan	Vishal, Prasanna Anu Emmanuel	Mysskin	An eccentric private detective who investigates the death of a dog associates it with various other murders committed.	
2018	Irumbu Thirai	Vishal, Arjun Sarja, Samantha Akkineni	P. S. Mithran	A military official is on a mission to nab cyber terrorist who has been hacking each and every person's bank account	
2018	Sandakozhi 2	Vishal, Keerthy Suresh, Varalaxmi Sarathkumar	N. Lingusamy	Father and son go against a lady who wants to avenge their family	
2021	Chakra	Vishal, Shraddha Srinath, Regina Cassandra, Srushti Dange	M.S. Anandan	A robbery by a gang of hackers and cybercriminals on the Independence Day of India.	
2022	Veerame Vaagai Soodum	Vishal, Dimple Hayathi	Thu Pa Saravanan	Porus, a young man, aspires to be a police officer. When his sister is murdered, he decides to take matters into his own hands and investigates the crime.	
2026	Magudam	Vishal, Anjali, Dushara Vijayan	Vishal	Don Lingappa "Linga", a dangerous but good-hearted gangster don who leads a lavish lifestyle, is estranged from his son Kirubakaran "Kripa", who wants absolutely nothing to do with his father's violent legacy. Instead of embracing his dangerous lineage, Kripa opts to live a humble life as a struggling medical representative alongside his wife Jamuna and their two children. When Kripa's family is suddenly caught in an intense conflict with ruthless local gangsters, Linga enters their lives to protect them, leading to an interconnected fight for survival and a high-octane quest for vengeance for his mother's death that bridges their divided worlds.	Co- produced with Super Good Films

As distributor

Year	Film	Notes
2013	Pattathu Yaanai	
2014	Jeeva	
2018	K.G.F: Chapter 1	Tamil version
2021	Chakra	Tamil Nadu Only
2025	Madha Gaja Raja	Tamil version; Filmed in 2012 and released after 12 years

== Film soundtracks released ==
Year	Film	Notes
2014	Poojai	Also producer
2015	Aambala	Also producer
2015	Kallappadam	
2015	Paayum Puli	
2015	Enakku Veru Engum Kilaigal Kidayathu	
2017	Thupparivaalan	Also producer
2017	Sakunthalavin Kadhalan	
2022	Veerame Vaagai Soodum	also producer
