= Anu Emmanuel =

American actress (born 1997)

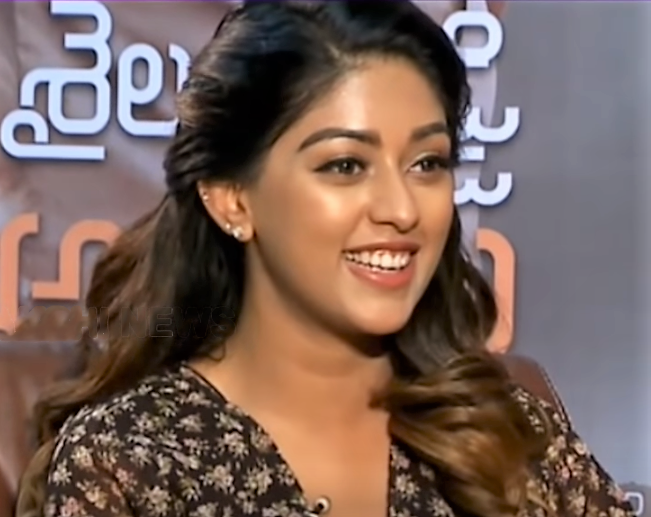
- Anu in 2018
- Born: Anu Emmanuel; 28 March 1997 (age 29); Chicago, Illinois, United States
- Occupation: Actress
- Years active: 2011 (child artist); 2016–present

Anu Emmanuel (pronounced [anu ɪˈmænjəwəl]; born 28 March 1997) is an American actress who primarily works in Telugu films along with Tamil and Malayalam films. Anu is a recipient of a Producers Guild Film Award.

After working as a child artist in Swapna Sanchari (2011), Anu made her film debut with Malayalam film Action Hero Biju (2016). Emmanuel made her Telugu film debut with Majnu (2016), for which she received SIIMA Award for Best Female Debut – Telugu nomination. She made her Tamil film debut with Thupparivaalan (2017), and starred in the commercially successful Namma Veetu Pillai (2019).

== Early life ==
Anu Emmanuel was born in the United States on 28 March 1997 and raised in Garland, Texas to Malayali parents from Kottayam, Kerala. She graduated from Lakeview Centennial High School in Garland in 2015. She pursued a degree in psychology but left after a year, moving to India to pursue an acting career.

== Career ==
Anu made her acting debut as a child artist in Jayaram starrer Swapna Sanchari under her father's production and then went on to do the lead role in Nivin Pauly starrer Action Hero Biju, directed by Abrid Shine. She made her Telugu debut with Majnu opposite to Nani. The film went on become a hit at box-office. During that time she was announced as the female lead in Oxygen, alongside actor Gopichand in the lead. In 2017, she made her Tamil debut with Thupparivaalan alongside Vishal. In 2018, she was paired opposite to Pawan Kalyan and Allu Arjun in Agnyaathavaasi and Naa Peru Surya respectively. She played the lead role in Shailaja Reddy Alludu along with Naga Chaitanya and Ramya Krishna. She made a cameo appearance in Geetha Govindam. She appeared in her second Tamil film Namma Veetu Pillai opposite to Sivakarthikeyan which became successful at the box-office.

In 2021, she starred in Alludu Adhurs along with Bellamkonda Sreenivas and Maha Samudram with Sharwanand. In 2022, Anu played the lead role in Urvasivo Rakshasivo opposite Allu Sirish. She appeared in Ravanasura opposite Ravi Teja. She returned to Tamil cinema in 2023 playing the female lead in Japan opposite Karthi.

== Filmography ==
=== Films ===
Key
†	Denotes films that have not yet been released

Year	Title	Role		Notes	Ref.
2011	Swapna Sanchari	Ashwathy "Achu"	Malayalam	Child artist	
2016	Action Hero Biju	Benitta Dominic / Kunjumol	Malayalam		
2016	Majnu	Kiranmayi "Kiran"	Telugu		
2017	Kittu Unnadu Jagratha	Janaki	Telugu		
2017	Thupparivaalan	Mallika	Tamil		
2017	Oxygen	Geetha	Telugu		
2018	Agnyaathavaasi	Suryakantham	Telugu		
2018	Naa Peru Surya	Varsha	Telugu		
2018	Geetha Govindam	Girl at Bus Stop	Telugu	Cameo appearance	
2018	Shailaja Reddy Alludu	Anu Reddy	Telugu		
2019	Namma Veettu Pillai	Maangani Shivashakthi	Tamil		
2021	Alludu Adhurs	Vasundhara "Vasu" Reddy	Telugu		
2021	Maha Samudram	Smitha	Telugu		
2022	Urvasivo Rakshasivo	Sindhuja "Sindhu"	Telugu		
2023	Ravanasura	Keerthana	Telugu		
2023	Japan	Sanju Kutty	Tamil		
2025	The Girlfriend	Durga "Dee"	Telugu		

== Awards and nominations ==
Year	Award	Category	Work	Result	Ref.
2016	Producers Guild Film Awards	Best Actress - Telugu	Majnu	Won	
2017	6th South Indian International Movie Awards	Best Female Debut – Telugu	Majnu	Nominated	
