= Thupparivaalan =

2017 film by Mysskin

- Theatrical release poster
- Directed by: Mysskin
- Written by: Mysskin
- Produced by: Vishal
- Starring: Vishal; Prasanna; Vinay Rai; Anu Emmanuel; Andrea Jeremiah
- Cinematography: V. I. Karthik
- Edited by: N. Arunkumar
- Music by: Arrol Corelli
- Production company: Vishal Film Factory
- Release date: 14 September 2017
- Country: India
- Language: Tamil

Thupparivaalan (transl. Detective) is a 2017 Indian Tamil-language action thriller film written and directed by Mysskin, and produced by Vishal. Vishal also enacts the lead role with Prasanna. The film features Vinay Rai, Anu Emmanuel (in her Tamil debut), Andrea Jeremiah and K. Bhagyaraj in supporting roles. Loosely inspired by British writer Arthur Conan Doyle's Sherlock Holmes stories, it follows a private detective and his associate who investigate the death of a child's pet dog, which leads to them uncovering a bigger conspiracy. The film began production in 2016, and was released on 14 September 2017.

== Plot ==
IT company owner Dhivakar is celebrating his birthday with his family when a sudden lightning strike fatally electrocutes him and his son before burning their bodies in front of his horrified wife and daughter. ACP Paul Dhanarajan intervenes in a groping incident at a cinema, and later dies in the middle of a police conference three days later. A brash yet brilliant private detective, Kaniyan Poongundran, aka Kani, who lives with his associate Manohar, aka Mano. They both come across Mallika, who leads a pickpocketing scheme with her younger siblings. After Kani deals with her alcoholic, abusive uncle, she comes to work as his housekeeper.

Naveen, a schoolboy, seeks help from Kani and Mano in solving the murder of his pet German Spitz, Nemo, which was shot dead on a beach. He provides them with a 9 mm ricocheted bullet retrieved from Nemo's body. Investigating the crime scene, Kani discovers a tooth, leading him to Swarnavel, a former physics professor, who is linked to a personal tragedy involving the accidental death of his son, which led to a divorce with his wife. Concurrently, a man named Kamalesh is involved in dubious dealings at a travel agency, delivering a money-laden sofa to a group of associates involved in contract killings, consisting of Devil, Muthu, Pritha, and a bald man.

Kani recollects a news article about the deaths of Dhivakar and his son and visits Mrs Dhivakar's house, where he finds that Swarnavel was present at a nearby construction site on the day of the incident. He then concludes that Swarnavel's artificial lightning killed Dhivakar. When the assassins learn that Kani is on their tail, Devil disposes of Swarnavel's body, who was killed earlier.

Kani and Manohar visit Dhivakar's office to learn that a tender has been transferred to Ram Prasad, a rival, who is soon assassinated. Kamalesh, seeking revenge, hires Chinese mercenaries to kill Kani. Kani defeats them and uncovers Kamalesh's involvement, but Pritha ultimately kills Kamalesh and an elderly couple. Kani then pursues the bald man and Pritha. The bald man then kills himself, allowing Pritha to escape. The next day, in a shopping mall, Pritha fails to kill Kani, but Mallika saves him.

Kani and Mano meet Police Inspector Madhivanan and ACP Vijayakumar in a hotel, where yet another failed assassin attempt is made. Muthu plans to inject Kani with a poison dart, but Mano is caught in the crossfire and rushed to the hospital. They learn that the same dart hit Mano as Paul. They raid the travel agency, and Devil kills Muthu to cover his tracks, and Muthu kills his dying wife before succumbing to his death. They find some physics books related to lightning

Kani receives a threatening SMS about the danger to his loved ones. He secures Manohar in the hospital but cannot save Mallika, who Devil fatally stabs. It is revealed that Madhivanan acted as an informer for Devil. Under interrogation, he confesses that Ram Prasad hired Devil's team to assassinate Dhivakar for a tender, enlisting Swarnavel to create artificial lightning. Swarnavel, overwhelmed by guilt over the collateral death of Dhivakar's son—who resembled his own late son—decides to expose the conspiracy. To silence him, Devil's team tracks down Swarnavel at a beach, where he is killed while attempting to flee with false passports. Nemo, the dog, tries to intervene but is accidentally shot during the struggle. Meanwhile, Paul, who was investigating a rape case involving a hotelier and his driver's wife, is murdered by Devil's team as they feared he was close to identifying the culprit. Kani, Manohar, and a police squad venture into a mangrove forest to locate Devil, resulting in the deaths of everyone except Kani, Manohar, and Vijayakumar. Eventually, Devil captures Kani and Vijayakumar and kidnaps Naveen to use as a hostage.

In a fight, Kani kills Devil. In his dying moments, Devil tells Naveen that he is sorry for killing Nemo. Later, as Naveen returns home from school one afternoon, he finds a Pomeranian puppy along with a note bearing Kani's name in a basket at his doorstep.

== Cast ==
- Vishal as Detective Kaniyan Poongundran
- Prasanna as Manohar
- Vinay Rai as John Richardson Holcha/Devil
- K. Bhagyaraj as Muthu aka Uncle
- Anu Emmanuel as Mallika
- Andrea Jeremiah as Pritha
- Shaji Chen as ACP Vijayakumar
- John Vijay as Kamalesh
- Master Nishesh as Naveen
- Ashvatt as Swarnavel
- Dheeraj Rathnam as a stout man
- Siddhanth Venkatesh as a bald man
- Abhishek Shankar as Inspector Madhivanan
- Jayaprakash as Ram Prasad
- Ravi Mariya as Mallika's uncle
- Aadukalam Naren as ACP Paul Dhanarajan
- Ajay Rathnam as Police Chief
- Thalaivasal Vijay as Madhavan
- Vincent Asokan as Dhivakar (Cameo appearance)
- Simran as Dhivakar's wife (Cameo appearance)

== Production ==
In February 2016, director Mysskin was reported to have begun working on a film starring Vishal. The film, titled Thupparivaalan, was formally launched at a ceremony in Chennai on 10 March 2016. Prior to the start of shoot, Mysskin cast several other leading actors and the film was dubbed by the media to be a "multi-starrer". Actress Rakul Preet Singh was cast in a leading role, making her comeback to Tamil films after becoming popular in the Telugu film industry. Likewise actors Vinay and Prasanna were signed to portray supporting roles. K. Bhagyaraj was also selected to portray a key antagonistic role. Vinay said he accepted the film to break out of the "chocolate boy" image he had been stereotyped in for years.

Principal photography began in Chennai on 26 September 2016. Soon after, Singh opted out of the film citing scheduling clashes, and was replaced by Malayalam actress Anu Emmanuel, who would make her debut in the Tamil film industry. Anu was signed following a test photo shoot in October 2016, where Mysskin asked her to sport a sari. Akshara Haasan was also signed on to portray another pivotal role during the same month and was expected to shoot for the film alongside her commitments in Vivegam (2017). Haasan later opted out of the project and was replaced in the role by Andrea Jeremiah. Mysskin signed Ashvatt for the pivotal role of Swarnavel, after he was impressed by the actor's earlier performances in his Mysskin's directorial Pisaasu and scripted Savarakathi.

In May 2017, Mysskin said there were only ten days more of filming required. He added that he was inspired by the tales of Sherlock Holmes, a detective created by British writer Arthur Conan Doyle and Vishal's character was inspired by the detective, while Prasanna's character was inspired by Dr. Watson from the Holmes stories. In August 2017, near the end of filming, Vishal suffered a minor injury on his knee while Vinay hurt his shoulders while filming an action scene. The pair, however, chose to continue with the shoot to avoid delays. Unlike most Indian films, the makers avoided including multiple songs; the only song in the film is "Ivan Thupparivaalan", written by Mysskin (who sings along with Hemambiga) and composed by Arrol Corelli, who also composed the background music.

== Release and reception ==
Thupparivaalan was released on 14 September 2017. M. Suganth of The Times of India wrote "[..] what sets Thupparivaalan apart from regular action thrillers is how it not only thrills us, but also makes us feel". Baradwaj Rangan wrote for Film Companion, "It was perhaps only a matter of time before Mysskin reached for Arthur Conan Doyle for what are his films, in essence, if not mysteries that involve a lot of detecting and end with big reveals?". Vishal Menon of The Hindu wrote, "After the disastrous Mugamoodi, Thupparivaalan was always going to be Mysskin's trial-by-fire in the world of big budget commercial cinema. With Thupparivaalan, Myskkin has opened up his universe to the common man, reminding us that there's nothing as pleasurable as seeing someone sneak a bit of art into entertainment cinema". Srivatsan of India Today wrote, "It's difficult not to think about Benedict Cumberbatch's Sherlock Holmes, in which he asks Watson to think. But in Thupparivaalan, Mysskin asks the audience to observe, with a fair bit of Mysskin-ness".

== Shelved sequel ==
A sequel titled Thupparivaalan 2, to be directed by Mysskin, was announced in 2019, with Vishal and Prasanna reprising their roles. The rest of the cast included Rahman, Nassar, Jayaprakash, Gautami and Suresh Chakravarthi. The music of the film was to be composed by Ilaiyaraaja. Principal photography began in early November 2019 in Bristol, and the first schedule wrapped a month later. After Mysskin and Vishal drifted apart in March 2020 over budget issues, filming resumed in November 2020 with Vishal as the primary director of the film. The film was planned to resume shooting in 2023, but the shooting never took place. The same year, Vishal announced his plans to revive the project in 2024. Pre-production subsequently began in March 2024, and principal photography was expected to begin in May 2024, but was later pushed to that November. As of 2025, the project has not materialised.
