= R. Madhi =

Indian film cinematographer (born 1971)

Madhie
- Born: Mathivanan Raju; 7 January 1971 (age 55); Nannilam, Tiruvarur district, Tamil Nadu, India
- Other name: Madhie
- Occupation: Cinematographer
- Years active: 2002–present

R. Madhi, also known professionally as Madhie, is an Indian cinematographer who primarily works in Tamil cinema and Telugu cinema. His notable works include Veyil (2006), Paiyaa (2010), Naan Mahaan Alla (2010), Mirchi (2013), Pandianadu (2013), Jeeva (2014), Srimanthudu (2015), Ghazi (2017), and Saaho (2019). He is the brother of late lyricist Piraisoodan.

== Filmography ==
Key
†	Denotes films that have not yet been released

Year	Film	Language	Notes
2002	Punnagai Desam	Tamil	
2004	Machi	Tamil	
2005	Gurudeva	Tamil; Telugu	
2005	Oru Kalluriyin Kathai	Tamil	
2006	Kalabha Kadhalan	Tamil	
2006	Veyil	Tamil	
2007	Ninaithaley	Tamil	
2008	Nepali	Tamil	
2008	Silambattam	Tamil	
2010	Paiyaa	Tamil	
2010	Naan Mahaan Alla	Tamil	
2011	Shaitan	Hindi	
2011	Rajapattai	Tamil	
2013	Mirchi	Telugu	
2013	Pandianadu	Tamil	
2013	Endrendrum Punnagai	Tamil	
2014	Run Raja Run	Telugu	
2014	Jeeva	Tamil	Also co-producer
2015	Srimanthudu	Telugu	
2016	Manithan	Tamil	
2017	Ghazi	Telugu; Hindi	
2018	Bhaagamathie	Telugu; Tamil	
2019	Saaho	Telugu; Hindi	
2022	Rowdy Boys	Telugu	
2022	Sarkaru Vaari Paata	Telugu	
2023	Tiger Nageswara Rao	Telugu	
2024	Yatra 2	Telugu	
2025	Champion	Telugu	
