= Chakra (2021 film) =

2021 film by MS Anandan

- Theatrical release poster
- Directed by: M.S.Anandan
- Written by: M.S.Anandan
- Produced by: Vishal
- Starring: Vishal; Shraddha Srinath; Regena Cassandrra
- Cinematography: Balasubramaniem
- Edited by: Thiyagu
- Music by: Yuvan Shankar Raja
- Production company: Vishal Film Factory
- Distributed by: PVR Pictures; B4U Motion Pictures (Hindi version)
- Release date: 19 February 2021
- Running time: 130 minutes
- Country: India
- Language: Tamil

Chakra (transl. Wheel) is a 2021 Indian Tamil-language action thriller film directed by M. S. Anandan in his directorial debut. The film stars Vishal, Shraddha Srinath, and Regena Cassandrra, alongside Srushti Dange, Robo Shankar, Vijay Babu, Manobala and K. R. Vijaya. The film's theme is based on cybercrime and e-commerce scams, where it revolves around a soldier and a cop joining to investigate the robberies that occurred on Independence Day. It was perceived to be an unofficial stand-alone sequel to Irumbu Thirai due to the similar theme and ending between the two films.

Chakra was released theatrically on 19 February to mixed reviews from critics and became a moderate success at the box office.

== Plot ==
Fifty robberies occurred on Independence Day, with two masked robbers looting houses and stealing expensive items totalling ₹70 million. The entire police force is clueless, without the slightest lead or evidence. The police assign ACP Gayathiri to the case investigation. Gayathri learns that the 50th house belongs to her ex-boyfriend Major Chandru. Chandru's grandmother gets injured in the theft in an attempt to safeguard the Ashoka Chakra medal, which the government bestowed on Chandru's late father. But the thieves stole the award.

Chandru joins Gayathri in the investigation to retrieve the medal and solve the case. Chandru checked the case details and information from the victims, only to realise that the robbers knew the exact location of jewellery and money in every house and swiftly carried out each robbery. Chandru lists the people who can access the homes and discovers that a company known as 'Dial For Help' may be involved in the case. They found a recurrent number belonging to Marimuthu servicing all 50 houses. The police rush to Marimuthu's house, only to find his wife there. Marimuthu's widow explains that her husband had died two years ago. Chandru, with no other clue, returns.

Meanwhile, a mysterious person calls the Commissioner and informs him that he is responsible for all the thefts thus far and challenges the entire force that no one can track him down. Accepting this as a challenge, Chandru tries to provoke the unknown person, who gives a clue to his location. They realise it refers to a place. They rush to the site only to find destroyed computers. Chandru heads back to share the clues. He reveals that the clue refers to the queen in chess and that the hacker had left a partial thumbprint on the scanner used to destroy all data. Chandru further informs that theft would occur in 58 more houses on August 23 due to the PM's arrival. So he cleverly places police officers inside the houses to be robbed. He informs that the hacker is a woman named Leela, a chess coach.

In a flashback, a young Leela loved her mother tremendously and they had a strong bond with each other, but her alcoholic and abusive father tortured her mother. One day, Leela woke up to find out that her mother died while asleep. Her father immediately married another woman and arrived home with her two young sons. Later, she comes home one day to hear her father reveal that he and his new wife had suffocated and killed Leela's mother while she was sleeping. Her mother tried to call a sleeping Leela but failed to do so. An enraged Leela killed her father and stepmother by leaking water and electrocuting them, and she used her stepmother's two sons as baits for her thefts. She became an intelligent hacker by studying computer science. It was Leela who informed the brothers not to rob the houses, and she was the main mastermind behind the robberies.

Gayathri and Chandru repair their relationship after he apologises to Gayathri's uncle for slapping him. Chandru's grandmother gains consciousness and explains that she pleaded with the robbers not to take the medal. She even gave her nose ring, but the hard-hearted robbers kicked her and took the nose stud. The brothers get arrested for bike theft. Gayathri beats up the brothers in an attempt for them to make them say their stepsister's name. However, the two brothers die after police shoot them for attacking and injuring Gayathri. A cat-and-mouse chase begins between Leela and Chandru, where Leela makes several attempts to kill Chandru, Gayathri and his team. Chandru manages to capture Leela, recover the stolen jewellery and money hidden in schoolbags at her friend Ganesh's house and hands her over to the police. He also retrieves his father's medal, which Leela buried in Chandru's garden. Chandru gets a call from Leela, who has escaped from jail and challenges him to another game.

== Cast ==
- Vishal as Major Chandru
- Shraddha Srinath as ACP Gayathri IPS
- Regena Cassandrra as Leela
- Srushti Dange as Rithu Bhatia, "Dial For Help" CEO
- Robo Shankar as Inspector Kumar
- Nassar as Chandru's late father (Photo Presence)
- Vijay Babu as Dheenadhayalan, Police Commissioner
- Amit Bhargav as Ganeshan
- Manobala as Gayathri's uncle
- K. R. Vijaya as Chandru's grandmother
- Ravikanth as Dial For Help Board member
- Rail Ravi as "Dial For Help" board member
- Pradeep K. Vijayan as "Dial For Help" board member
- Maha Delhi Ganesh as Leela's stepbrother
- Arjunan as a hacker

Cameo appearances

- Aruldoss as Leela's late father
- Neelima Rani as Leela's late mother
- Baby Krithika as a young Leela
- B Jayalekshmi as Leela's late stepmother

== Production ==
The film was initially touted to be the sequel of Vishal's previous action thriller hacker film Irumbu Thirai, which became a success at the box office in 2018. The film was rumored to be titled Irumbu Thirai 2 as the film genre was quite similar to the former. However the film was later titled as Chakra by the filmmakers as the film story revolves around Ashoka Chakra which is the highest peacetime military decoration in India. Veteran actress K. R. Vijaya made a comeback through this film after a sabbatical of three years. In preparation for their roles, both Shraddha Srinath and Regina Cassandra underwent training in martial arts and motorcycle riding, respectively.

== Music ==
The film score was composed by Yuvan Shankar Raja, containing only three songs.

- Harla Farla - Yuvan Shankar Raja, Sanjana Kalmanje
- Amma - Chinmayi, Prarthana
- Scream of Darkness (Theme)

== Release ==
=== Theatrical ===
The film was initially supposed to have its theatrical release on 1 May 2020 coinciding with the May Day but was postponed due to the COVID-19 pandemic in India. The film was released on 19 February 2021.

== Reception ==
=== Box office ===
Chakra, made on a budget of ₹31.5 crore, collected ₹65 crore and was a moderate success, despite reportedly incurring a loss of ₹3.5 crore.

=== Critical response ===
M. Suganth of The Times of India gave 2.5/5 stars and wrote "Chakra is more focused on momentary thrills and the film feels rather tame." Sify gave 2.5/5 stars and wrote "Overall, Chakra is an average action thriller. The backstory lacks emotional connect and the only solace is the constant cat and mouse game between cops and the robbers." Srinivasan Ramanujan of The Hindu wrote "The Vishal-starrer cashes in on a timely subject, but does little justice to it."

== Controversies ==
The Madras High Court issued a temporary stay order preventing the release of the film over copyright claims. Trident Arts studio which was initially offered to produce the film filed complaint at the High Court stating that the story of the film was initially narrated to them by the film director. It was revealed that the producer of Trident Arts, Ravi entered a contract with the director Anandan to produce the film. However, the production was later handed over to Vishal Film Factory without the consent of Trident Arts. In addition, Madras HC urged Vishal to pay compensation for the losses incurred by the producer of his previous film Action. The dispute between Trident Arts and Vishal Film Factory was solved just days before the film's release.
