= Aambala =

2015 Indian film directed by Sundar C

- Theatrical release poster
- Directed by: Sundar C
- Written by: Radhakrishnan (Dialogues)
- Screenplay by: Sundar C S.B.Ramadoss
- Story by: Sundar C
- Produced by: Vishal
- Starring: Vishal; Hansika Motwani; Prabhu; Vaibhav; Santhanam; Sathish; Ramya Krishnan; Kiran Rathod; Aishwarya
- Cinematography: Gopi Amarnath
- Edited by: N. B. Srikanth
- Music by: Hiphop Tamizha
- Production company: Vishal Film Factory
- Release date: 14 January 2015
- Running time: 146 minutes
- Country: India
- Language: Tamil

Aambala (transl. Man) is a 2015 Indian Tamil-language action comedy film co-written, co-produced and directed by Sundar C. Produced by Vishal, it features him in the leading role alongside an ensemble cast including Hansika Motwani, Prabhu, Vaibhav, Santhanam, Sathish, Ramya Krishnan, Kiran Rathod, Aishwarya, Maadhavi Latha, Madhuurima, and Pradeep Rawat. The music was composed by Hiphop Tamizha. The film was released on 14 January 2015.

== Plot ==
Saravanan lives in Ooty and runs a business that gathers people for politicians and events. One day, he meets Maya and falls for her. However, "RDX" Rajasekhar, a police inspector, also loves her. Saravanan convinces Rajasekhar not to pursue Maya, saying she is too high-class. Due to several mishaps, Rajasekhar is fired and starts working as a hotel doorman. He is shocked to find Saravanan and Maya going out together. He asks Saravanan how he made Maya fall in love with him. As Saravanan finishes his story, it reveals that Saravanan indirectly caused those mishaps that led to Rajasekhar's firing. Enraged, Rajasekhar hires Kumaran, a specialist in break-ups. Kumaran then sends a woman who makes Maya break up with Saravanan.

Dejected, Saravanan becomes drunk and falls unconscious. Kumaran, who is also at the bar, drops Saravanan off at his house. Saravanan's mother, Thulasi, ashamed of his behaviour, sends him to meet his father, Aalavanthan, and younger brother, Shakthi, in Madurai. There, they meet Aalavanthan and rejoin him. They discover that Kumaran is also the son of Aalavanthan's ex-lover.

Aalavanthan reveals to his sons that they have three aunts: Periya Ponnu, Nadu Ponnu, and Chinna Ponnu. Aalavanthan wants his sons to marry the daughters of their aunts so that their families can reunite once and for all. A reluctant Saravanan helps his brothers and father attend a temple function in disguise to kidnap and marry their cousins, but they kidnap their aunts. They run away before getting caught. Saravanan agrees to the plan after discovering that Periya Ponnu's daughter is Maya.

Periya Ponnu believes Pasupathy, the MLA and ex-servant of Aalavanthan's family, committed the kidnapping. Periya Ponnu decides to run against him in the next election. Pasupathy sends men to kill the aunts, but the brothers save them, disguised as police officers. Using this disguise, the trio gains access to their aunts' house. There, their uncles help facilitate the brothers' affection for their daughters. The trio succeeds in gaining the daughters' love.

Pasupathy provokes Periya Ponnu by wagering that if he loses to her, he will work at her home as a servant, but if she loses, her daughter Maya will marry his son. Using his knowledge of politics, Saravanan helps his aunt gain popularity. However, a few days before the elections, the aunts find out that Saravanan's father is their estranged brother Aalavanthan, whom they believe killed their father. Their hatred towards Aalavanthan results in them getting Saravanan and his brothers arrested.

His sisters' harsh words hurt Aalavanthan who suffers a heart attack and becomes hospitalised. While Saravanan and his brothers are in jail, his aunt loses popularity due to Pasupathy's devious manipulation. Saravanan calls Rajasekhar, who bails out the brothers and exposes Pasupathy's dirty tricks. To avoid defeat, Pasupathy tries to bribe people to vote for him, but Saravanan and Kumaran foil his plan, giving Periya Ponnu the edge. Pasupathy arrives at the home to kill the family and take Maya, but Maya has already escaped to elope with Saravanan. Saravanan, though, insists they go back. A furious Pasupathy reveals that he was the one who killed Aalavanthan's father, and framed Aalavanthan. He attacks Periya Ponnu just as Maya and Saravanan return. Saravanan fights Pasupathy and his son. At last, when Pasupathy goes to get his men, he finds that all the men assembled are Saravanan's gang members, which defeats him. The family reunites and celebrates the three brothers' weddings with their cousins.

== Cast ==
- Vishal as Saravanan
- Hansika Motwani as Maya
- Prabhu as Aalavanthan
- Vaibhav Reddy as Kumaran
- Sathish as Shaktivel
- Santhanam as Inspector RDX Rajasekhar
- Ramya Krishnan as Periya Ponnu
- Kiran Rathod as Chinna Ponnu
- Aishwariyaa Bhaskaran as Nadu Ponnu
- Nyra Banerjee as Chinna Ponnu's daughter
- Maadhavi Latha as Nadu Ponnu's daughter
- Tulasi as Tulasi, Saravanan and Sakthi's mother
- Pradeep Rawat as Pasupathy
- Rajeev Govinda Pillai as Pasupathy's son
- Abhishek Shankar as Periya Ponnu's husband
- Sriman as Nadu Ponnu's husband
- Gowtham Sundararajan as Chinna Ponnu's husband
- Raj Kapoor as Saravanan's uncle
- Vijayakumar as Solavandhan
- Manobala as Commissioner
- Mohana as Maya's friend
- Vichu Vishwanath as Periya Ponnu's bodyguard
- Santhana Bharathi as Thalaivar
- Kanal Kannan as Henchman
- George Maryan as Eli Josiyam
- Thalapathy Dinesh as Pasupathy's henchman
- Andrea Jeremiah as Unknown woman with the husband's fake photo (cameo appearance)
- Poonam Bajwa as a bar dancer in an item song "Madras to Madurai"
- Khushbu as herself in a special appearance "Aye Aye"
- Hiphop Tamizha Adhi as himself in a special appearance "Inbam Pongum Vennila"

== Production ==
In May 2014, actor Vishal and director Sundar C were announced to collaborate for a second venture, despite their first film together, Madha Gaja Raja, yet to release at the time. Hansika Motwani was selected for the project, collaborating with Sundar for his third consecutive film. Three former lead actresses, Ramya Krishnan, Aishwarya and Kiran Rathod, were finalised to play Vishal's aunts. Besides Motwani, the film was said to feature two more heroines, who played the daughters of the three aunts, with Telugu actresses Madhuurima and Maadhavi Latha being recruited for the roles in September 2014.

Principal photography began in July 2014. The team shot scenes in Kumbakonam in the same month. Subsequently, the film was shot in locations including Ooty and Pollachi. By mid-December filming was mostly complete, with a song sequence left to be shot at Italy, and another in Oman. The film has over 1000 visual effects provided by Prasad EFX.

== Music ==
Aambala

Soundtrack album by Hiphop Tamizha
- Released: 27 December 2014
- Recorded: 2014
- Genre: Feature film soundtrack
- Length: 24:46
- Language: Tamil
- Labels: V Music; Sa Re Ga Ma
- Producer: Hiphop Tamizha

Hiphop Tamizha chronology
Thaamirabharani (2007)	Aambala (2014)	Indru Netru Naalai (2015)

The soundtrack was composed by Hiphop Tamizha, a duo consisting of Adhi and Jeeva. Yuvan Shankar Raja was initially selected to compose the music, but he later opted out of the project. It was initially announced that five different composers would work on the project including Hiphop Tamizha. However, Hiphop Tamizha had "grown tired of doing one song here and there" and told Sundar that they would do "all or nothing", leading to them being the film's only composers. The album consists of six tracks with one of them being a remix of the song "Inbam Pongum" from Veerapandiya Kattabomman (1959). The audio launch was held on 27 December 2014 at Sathyam Cinemas.

All lyrics are written by Hiphop Tamizha.

Track listing
No.	Title	Singer(s)	Length
1.	"Madras To Madurai"	Kailash Kher, Vishnupriya Ravi, Maria Roe Vincent	4:22
2.	"Pazhagihkalaam"	Hiphop Tamizha	3:56
3.	"Vaa Vaa Vaa Vennila"	Mohit Chauhan, Amrita Shekar, Nirthya Maria Andrews	4:01
4.	"Aye Aye Aye"	Hiphop Tamizha	3:51
5.	"Yaar Enna Sonnalum"	Kutle Khan, Anthony Dassan, Varun Parandhaman	4:50
6.	"Inbam Pongum Vennila"	Hiphop Tamizha	3:46
Total length:			24:46

== Release and reception ==
Aambala was released on 15 January 2015, during the week of Pongal. Sify stated, "There isn't one quiet moment in Aambala, a masala comic entertainer which is purely targeted at audiences seeking mindless actioners laced with family sentiments, comedy and plenty of glamour" and added, "If you leave your logic minds at home; there are chances that you might enjoy this ride". Karthik Keramalu of IBNLive rated 1.5 out of 5 and stated, "Sundar C shines in moments... Yet the film turns out to be, at the end, a reckless stitching up of humorous GIFs. This is because the film has no scope for entertaining the audience anew". M Suganth of The Times of India rated the film 2.5 out of 5 and called Aambala a "masala movie that is a trip through time, and not in a good way. The film is filled with tropes that would have been acceptable in the 90s. We have families that are separated because of an incident in the past, lost-and-found moments, henpecked husbands, botched up kidnapping plans, outdated athai ponnu romance, and so on. It is only the comedy scenes that keep reminding us that we are watching a Sundar C film, but even these become tiresome and even crass at times". IANS gave 1 star out of 5 and called it "unarguably the worst product to have come out of Sundar's factory... the film turns out to be a clichéd rehash of several family stories with adequate dose of action and nauseating comedy".
