= Vishal (actor) =

Indian actor and film producer (born 1977)

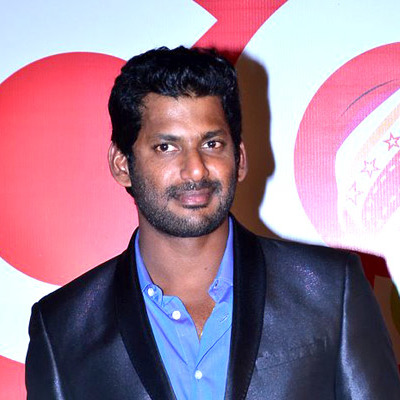
- Vishal at CCL 4 Launch
- Born: Vishal Krishna Reddy; 29 August 1977 (age 49); Chennai, Tamil Nadu, India
- Other name: Puratchi Thalapathy
- Education: Loyola College, Chennai
- Occupations: Actor; Film producer; Playback singer; Film director
- Years active: 2004–present
- Organization: Vishal Film Factory
- Partner: Sai Dhanshika (2025–present)
- Relatives: Sriya Reddy (sister-in-law); Vikram Krishna (brother)
- Honours: Kalaimamani (2006)
- Website: Vishal Film Factory

Vishal Krishna Reddy (born 29 August 1977), professionally known as Vishal, is an Indian actor and film producer who works in Tamil cinema. He produces films under his production company, Vishal Film Factory. Vishal was conferred with the Kalaimamani award in 2006 for his contributions to Tamil cinema.

Vishal entered the film industry as an assistant director to Arjun. He then became an actor and played his first lead role in the romantic thriller Chellamae (2004), before acting in the action films Sandakozhi, Thimiru, Thaamirabharani and Malaikottai. Vishal chose to create his own production studio and has since produced and worked on Pandiya Naadu (2013), Naan Sigappu Manithan (2014) and Poojai (2014).

== Early life and education ==
Vishal Krishna Reddy was born on 29 August 1977 into a Telugu-speaking family in Chennai, Tamil Nadu. His father and mother, G. K. Reddy and Janaki Devi, are business people and film producers in Telugu and Tamil films. His elder brother, Vikram Krishna, is also an actor and producer who has produced several of Vishal's films. His family hails from Nellore, Andhra Pradesh.

Vishal did his schooling at Don Bosco Matriculation Higher Secondary School, Chennai. He then graduated in visual communications from the Loyola College, Chennai.

== Acting career ==
=== 2004–2011 ===
Vishal assisted actor-director Arjun in his venture Vedham (2001), and a producer spotted Vishal on the sets of the film and signed him to appear in an acting role in Gandhi Krishna's Chellamae (2004). Accepting the role, Vishal prepared by joining Koothu-P-Pattarai to hone his acting skills and played the protagonist role of Raghunandan, whose wife is kidnapped by her childhood friend. A critic described his performance is "apt" but "there was plenty left to hone". His next film was Sandakozhi (2005) with N. Linguswamy, who had previously worked with his father's production house as an assistant director. Vishal was described to have "improved from his Chellamae days" and "clicked as an action hero". Film journalists stated that he was "the fastest rising action hero" of the time. After a cameo as himself in Sasi's Dishyum (2006), he went on to appear in Tarun Gopi's action film Thimiru (2006). The film opened to mixed reviews with Vishal being praised for his intense performance with a critic calling his performance "the film's only strength and, to an extent, making up for the weak script and poor characterisation". The film became Vishal's third consecutive commercial success, and he began to emerge in Tamil films.

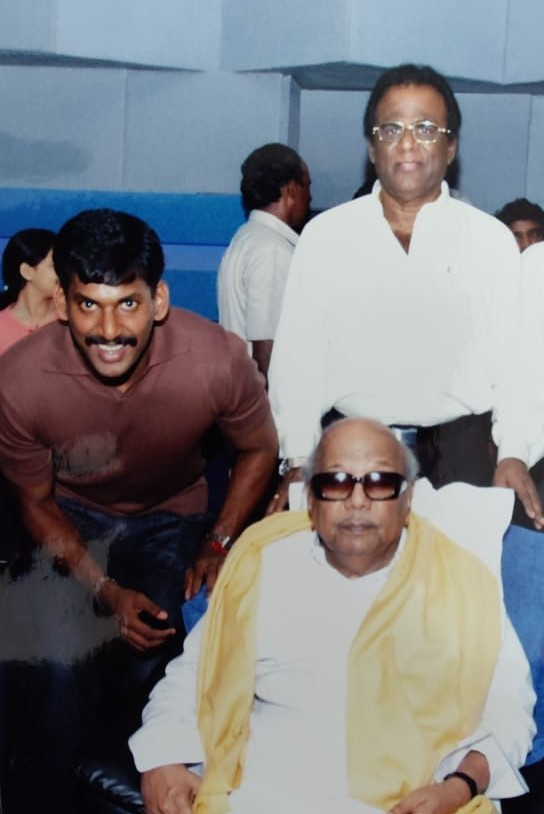
Vishal with his father G. K. Reddy and former Chief Minister of Tamil Nadu M. Karunanidhi.

His next film, the political action drama Sivappathigaram (2006), directed by Karu Palaniappan was a failure financially despite favourable reviews. His next film was released in January 2007, Hari's multi-starring family action drama Thaamirabharani (2007) and the film went on to gain considerable box office success, carrying good reports amidst other big budget releases. Later in the year, he appeared in Boopathy Pandian's Malaikottai (2007), a comedy entertainer. In his first full-length comic role, Vishal received mixed feedback for his portrayal from critics, with Rediff stating that he is "a far cry from the rather endearing young man in Sandakozhi", whilst describing his performance as "cringe-able". Behindwoods stated it is an "Average masala-mix entertainer". The film took a large opening and was declared a blockbuster, featuring in the top 10 at Behindwoods box office. In the year 2008, for the first time, Vishal portrayed a police officer in Sathyam, which became a commercial failure at the box office. Then both his films Thoranai (2009) and Theeradha Vilaiyattu Pillai (2010) were just average grossers. Additionally, the box-office duds, Sathyam and Thoranai, both of which were bilingual in Tamil and Telugu, failed to establish his popularity in Telugu cinema.

Vishal was then given the opportunity to feature in Bala's dark comedy Avan Ivan (2011), after being recommended to the director by his friend Arya. Portraying a village stage actor with a squint, Vishal had severe eye pain and headaches, and he also had a serious muscular injury on sets. The film opened to mixed reviews, though Vishal's performance won positive reviews. Indiaglitz stated that Vishal delivered an "award winning performance" and that his "mannerisms and body language give you goosebumps". The reviewer further cited that "Vishal's spontaneous response to his mentor's death in the movie is touching. His demonstration of Navarasas in front of actor Suriya will melt you in tears". Vishal played the role of a police officer in his following release Vedi (2011), directed by Prabhu Deva, which was declared an instant flop at the box office.

=== 2013–present ===
In the 2013 film Samar, Vishal played a forest trek guide. Behindwoods stated that he "rocks in the action sequences". Following a cameo role in Theeya Velai Seiyyanum Kumaru, he starred in the action films Pattathu Yaanai and Pandiya Naadu. The latter was Vishal's debut production venture, while the former was the film debut of Aishwarya Arjun, the daughter of Arjun. Vishal opted to produce and collaborate with Thiru for a third venture Naan Sigappu Manithan (2014), a revenge drama, in which his character had narcolepsy. To prepare for the lead role, Vishal read up and studied real life case studies of people with the disorder, citing that there were no references from cinema which he could watch and learn. Then he had acted under director Hari for the second time in Poojai (2014), which did somewhat good business at the box office. In 2015, he acted two films, namely, Aambala and Paayum Puli.

In 2013, Vishal started his own production house named Vishal Film Factory. He has produces and distributed a number of films under the banner and has also acted in all of them. Some of these films include, Pandiya Naadu (2013), Kathakali (2016), Thupparivaalan (2017), Irumbu Thirai (2018) and Veerame Vaagai Soodum (2022). For Pandiya Naadu, he won SIIMA Best Debutant Producer Award.

In 2016, he appeared in three movies; Kathakali, Marudhu and Kaththi Sandai. The first two were average grossers, while Kaththi Sandai became a flop at the box office. In January 2017, Vishal signed his debut Malayalam film, as the main antagonist in the Mohanlal-starrer Villain, directed by B. Unnikrishnan.

He was elected as President of Tamil Film Producers Council election, which was held on 2 April 2017. Apart from this, Vishal is also a staunch advocate against online piracy since 2014, having started an anti-piracy cell.

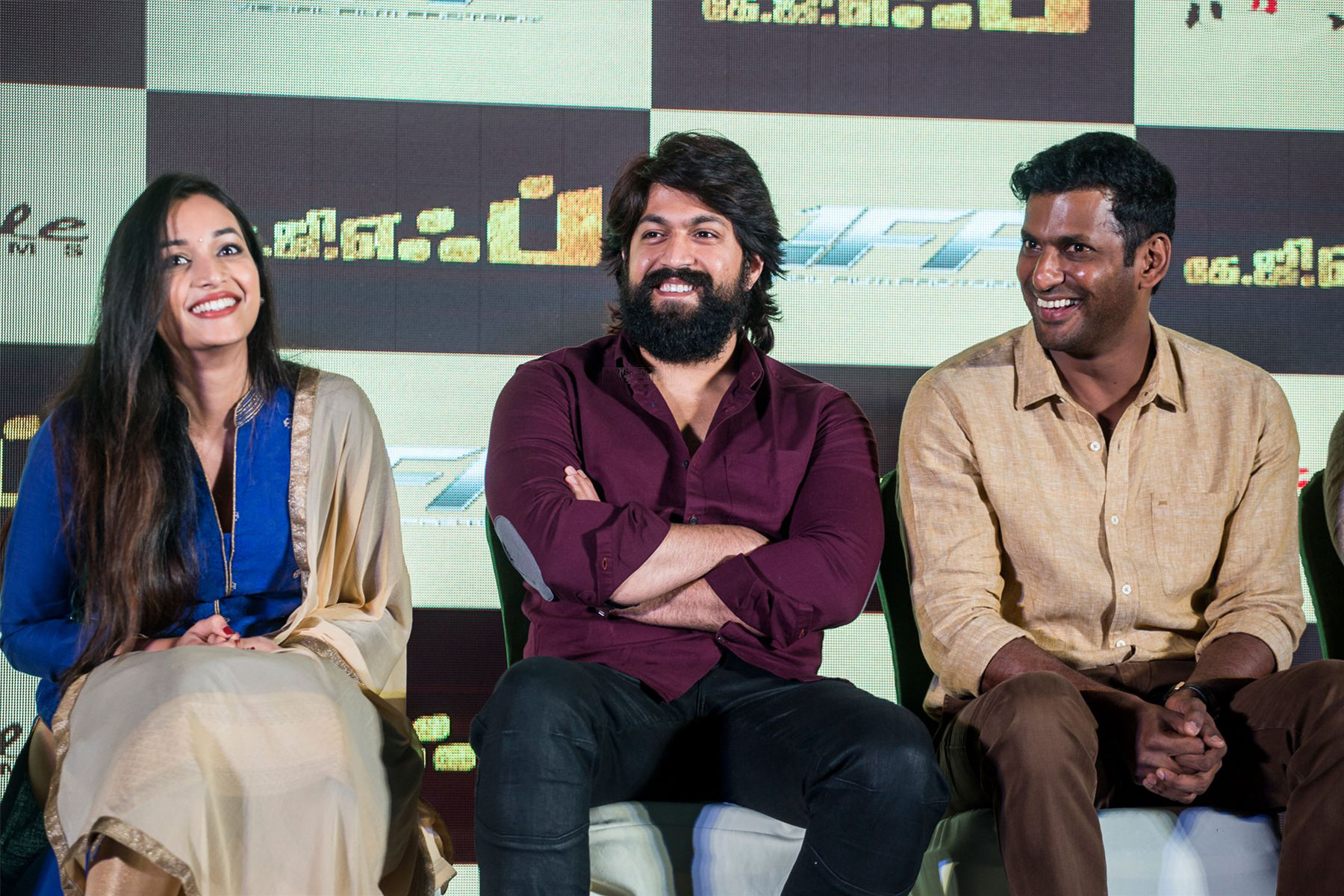
Vishal with Yash and Srinidhi Shetty at KGF Press Meet

In September 2017, Vishal played a detective in Thupparivaalan directed by Mysskin which was loosely based on the British writer Arthur Conan Doyle's detective character, Sherlock Holmes. The film was a commercial success and was appreciated by audiences and critics. In 2018, Vishal had two major releases. The first one was Irumbu Thirai directed by newcomer P. S. Mithran which released in May 2018. And second was Sandakozhi 2 released in October 2018 was written and directed by N. Lingusamy. A sequel to the successful Sandakozhi (2005), the film stars Vishal in his 25th film. The film turned out to be an average grosser.

He made his television début in October 2018 as a host of Sun Naam Oruvar, a talk show airing on Sun TV.

In 2019, he did one movie titled Action directed by Sundar C. The film received mixed reviews and was a box office failure. In 2021, he acted in Chakra directed my newcomer M.S Anandan. The film received mixed reviews from critics and audience and become an average grosser. His movies, Enemy (2021), Veeramae Vaagai Soodum (2022) and Laththi (2022) opened to mixed reviews from critics. However, his next film, Mark Antony (2023) received positive reviews from critics and audience and became a box office success which was a comeback for Vishal after string of failures. It was Vishal's highest-grossing film in his career worldwide, surpassing Irumbu Thirai and his first film to gross 100 crore worldwide. In 2024, Vishal's portrayal of Rathnam directed by Hari. The film rides on a fairly engaging premise but crumbles under the weight of a needlessly dense screenplay. After an incredible 12-year delay, Vishal's much-awaited Tamil action-comedy Madha Gaja Raja finally saw the light of day, releasing in theatres on 12 January 2025. Initially announced in 2012, the film endured a turbulent production journey marked by cast changes, script rewrites, and even disputes with distributors.

== Political career ==
Vishal was elected as the General Secretary of the Nadigar Sangam in October 2015 after initiating a movement against the previous committee. He was expelled from Tamil Film Producers' Council (TFPC) for remarks against the council. Later in April 2017, he won the election as President of Tamil Film Producers Council.

Vishal filed his nomination as an independent candidate for the by-poll to Radhakrishnan Nagar constituency in Chennai, which fell vacant following Jayalalithaa's death in December 2016. But his nomination was rejected.

== Personal life ==
In 2025, Vishal openly announced his relationship with actress Sai Dhanshika, his friend of fifteen years at the time, during the press-meet of the film Yogi Da. The pair got engaged on 29 August 2025, on his 48th birthday.

== Filmography ==
=== Films ===
Key
†	Denotes films that have not yet been released

- All films are in Tamil, unless otherwise noted.

Year	Film	Role	Notes	Ref.
1989	Jadikketha Moodi	Dancer	Child artist; cameo in the song "Meesavatcha Ambalaikkelam"	
2004	Chellamae	Ragunandan		
2005	Sandakozhi	Balu		
2005	Dishyum	Himself	Cameo	
2006	Thimiru	Ganesh		
2006	Sivappathigaram	Sathyamoorthy		
2007	Thaamirabharani	Bharani Puthiran		
2007	Malaikottai	Anbu		
2008	Satyam	ACP Sathyam	Simultaneously shot in Telugu as Salute	
2009	Thoranai	Murugan	Simultaneously shot in Telugu as Pistha	
2010	Theeradha Vilaiyattu Pillai	Karthik		
2011	Avan Ivan	Walter Vanangamudi		
2011	Vedi	ASP Prabhakaran "Balu"		
2013	Samar	Shakthi		
2013	Theeya Velai Seiyyanum Kumaru	Himself	Cameo	
2013	Pattathu Yaanai	Saravanan		
2013	Pandiya Naadu	Sivakumar	Also producer	
2014	Naan Sigappu Manithan	Indhiran	Also producer	
2014	Kathai Thiraikathai Vasanam Iyakkam	Himself	Cameo	
2014	Poojai	Vasu Devan	Also producer	
2015	Aambala	Saravanan	Also producer	
2015	Vasuvum Saravananum Onna Padichavanga	ACP Vetrivel	Cameo	
2015	Paayum Puli	ACP Jayaseelan		
2016	Kathakali	Amudhavel	Also producer	
2016	Marudhu	Marudhu		
2016	Kaththi Sandai	Arjun Ramakrishnan "Cheenu"		
2017	Thupparivaalan	Kaniyan Poongundran	Also producer	
2017	Villain	Dr. Sakthivel Palaniswamy	Malayalam film	
2018	Irumbu Thirai	Major R. Kathiravan	Also producer	
2018	Sandakozhi 2	Balu	25th film	
2019	Ayogya	SI Karnan		
2019	Action	Colonel Subhash		
2021	Chakra	Major Chandru	Also producer	
2021	Enemy	Chozhan		
2022	Veeramae Vaagai Soodum	Purushothaman "Porus"	Also producer	
2022	Laththi	Muruganantham		
2023	Mark Antony	Mark and Antony	Dual role	
2024	Rathnam	Rathnam		
2025	Madha Gaja Raja	Raja	Also distributor; released after 13 years, filmed in 2012	
2026	Magudam	Kirubakran "Kripa" and Don Lingappa "Linga"	Directional debut; dual role	
2027	Purushan †	TBA	Filming	

=== Television ===
Year	Show	Channel	Role	Reference(s)
2018–2019	Sun Naam Oruvar	Sun TV	Host	

== Discography ==
List of songs sung by Vishal
Year	Film	Song	Notes	Ref.
2013	Madha Gaja Raja	"My Dear Loveru"		
2023	Mark Antony (D)	"Adharadha"	Telugu version	

== Awards and nominations ==
Year	Award	Category	Work	Result	Ref.
2006	Kalaimamani	Contributions to Tamil cinema	—N/a	Won	
2011	Norway Tamil Film Festival Awards	Special Jury Award	Avan Ivan	Won	
2012	1st South Indian International Movie Awards	Best Actor – Tamil	Avan Ivan	Nominated	
2012	6th Vijay Awards	Best Actor	Avan Ivan	Nominated	
2014	3rd South Indian International Movie Awards	Best Actor – Tamil	Pandiya Naadu	Nominated	
2014	3rd South Indian International Movie Awards	Best Debutant Producer	Pandiya Naadu	Won	
2014	8th Vijay Awards	Best Actor	Pandiya Naadu	Nominated	
2018	10th Vijay Awards	Best Actor	Thupparivaalan	Nominated	
