= Pandiya Naadu =

2013 Indian film by Suseenthiran

- Theatrical poster
- Directed by: Suseenthiran
- Written by: Suseenthiran; Bhaskar Sakthi (Dialogue)
- Screenplay by: Suseenthiran
- Story by: Suseenthiran
- Produced by: Vishal
- Starring: Vishal; Bharathiraja; Lakshmi Menon; Sharath Lohitashwa
- Cinematography: R. Madhi
- Edited by: Anthony
- Music by: D. Imman
- Production company: Vishal Film Factory
- Distributed by: Vendhar Movies
- Release date: 2 November 2013
- Running time: 137 minutes
- Country: India
- Language: Tamil
- Box office: ₹50 crore

Pandiya Naadu (transl. Pandiya's kingdom) is a 2013 Indian Tamil-language action drama film directed by Suseenthiran and produced by Vishal, who stars in the lead role alongside Lakshmi Menon, Bharathiraja, Soori, Vikranth, and Sharath Lohitashwa. The music was composed by D. Imman with cinematography by R. Madhi and editing by Anthony.

Pandiya Naadu was released on 2 November 2013 during Diwali, where it received positive reviews from critics. It was dubbed in Hindi as Shiva Ka Badla and remade in Kannada as Rudra Tandava with Chiranjeevi Sarja.

== Plot ==
Sivakumar is a meek person who owns a cellphone sales and service center in Madurai with his friend and sidekick Ganesan. Siva's father Kalyanasundaram is a retired government employee who shows much care on Siva's elder brother Nagarajan, an honest government officer. Simmakkal Ravi is a notorious gangster who rules Madurai with an iron fist. Sethu is Siva's best friend who helps him woo Malar by beating up men who were harassing her. Later, Sethu learns that Ravi's chief henchman Bharani has been harassing his ex-lover Amudha. Sethu soon stabs Bharani and flees with Amudha from Madurai on Siva's advice.

Meanwhile, Nagaraj confronts Ravi over the deaths of workers at his quarry, which is deeper than the legal limit, and shuts it down. An angered Ravi kills Nagaraj and stages his death as a road accident. At the hospital, a frightened Kalyanasundaram learns that Ravi killed Nagaraj and is threatened by Ravi's men to keep quiet about the incident. They also forge Kalyanasundaram's signature for a document stating that Nagarajan was driving under the influence. Siva confides to Ganesan that he had discovered the truth about Nagarajan's death and wants to exact vengeance against Ravi. Kalyanasundaram also decide to exact vengeance on Ravi, where he pays ₹3,000,000 ($50,000) to a prisoner for organizing a hit squad to finish Ravi.

Through Ganesan, Siva provides hacked smartphones to Ravi and his assistant in order to track their calls and monitors Ravi's activities, biding his time for the right moment. Siva plans to kill Ravi, who leaves for Coonoor to meet his minister friend. When Siva prepares to attack, the hit squad attacks Ravi in the same spot. As Ravi fights back, Siva runs in to try and kill Ravi, but is seen masked by Bharani. Ravi kills all of the hit squad members and finds out about the person who hired them. Ravi forces the hit squad organizer to make his client arrive at the bus stand on the pretext of returning the money.

Ravi and his gang wait at the bus stand to capture and kill the person. To retrieve his money, Kalyanasundaram arrives at the bus stand and is chased after by Ravi's gang. Kalyanasundaram falls unconscious due to the health problems until a masked Siva defeats Ravi's men and takes him to the hospital. Siva and Ganesan, who had retrieved the money, learns about Kalyanasundaram lamenting about his foiled plan to finish Ravi. Siva continues to follow Ravi and forms a plan with Ganesan to kill him at a temple festival. Suspecting a member of the general public, Ravi has the police commissioner round up all male family members of civilians whom he had killed to discover the killer.

Siva learns that Ravi is at a meeting in a theatre, where he goes to the theatre bathroom to kill Ravi despite Ganesan's advice. However, Siva is evicted by one of Ravi's men and leaves his sickle in the stall. Bharani recognises Siva from their past encounters, while Ravi notices the sickle and chases after Siva. Siva escapes and meets Amudha, who tells him that Sethu is also killed by Ravi. After Siva told Sethu to leave, the cops under Ravi's payroll captured Sethu and handed him over to Ravi. Bharani killed Sethu right in front of Amudha. Enraged at Sethu"s death, Siva kills Bharani and Ravi's henchmen, where he finally confronts Ravi.

Siva and Ravi have a tense and fierce combat, where Siva mortally wounds Ravi. Siva takes Ravi into a well and leaves him there to his death, telling him that he represents all the innocent people whom Ravi has killed. The news mentions about Ravi's partially-decomposed body being discovered after Siva gives an anonymous tip to the police. Siva secretly tells Kalyanasundaram about his role in all the events, where Kalyanasundaram embraces his son with joy and takes a walk with his grandson.

== Cast ==
- Vishal as Sivakumar Kalyanasundaram
- Bharathiraja as Kalyanasundaram, Siva's father
- Lakshmi Menon as Malarvizhi Chidambaram
- Soori as Ganesan alias "Doubt", Siva's friend
- Vikranth as Sethu
- Sharath Lohitashwa as Simmakkal Ravi
- Harish Uthaman as Bharani
- Guru Somasundaram as Nagaraj, Siva's brother
- Tulasi as Sivagami Chidambaram
- Advaitha as Amudha
- V. I. S. Jayapalan as Ravi's advisor
- Amudheshwar as Sivappu Raja
- Soumya Satish as Amudha Kalyanasundaram
- Vazhakku En Muthuraman as Raasu
- Baby Rakshana as Pooja
- Bava Lakshmanan
- Krishna Priya

== Production ==
In March 2013, Vishal announced that he is going to work with Suseenthiran in a film tipped to be a commercial action entertainer, and the crew will be more or less the same that worked in Suseenthiran's Naan Mahaan Alla, which was of the same genre. After that, Suseenthiran confirmed that Vishal will act and also produce this movie under his home banner Vishal Film Factory. After some days, they announced the title as Pandianadu and the cast and crew. Lakshmi Menon was selected to play the love interest of Vishal, and D. Imman was signed to score the music. Vikranth was cast in a pivotal role along with Soori and Aaranya Kaandam fame Guru Somasundaram. Bharathiraja was signed to play Vishal's father in the film. Shooting started on 15 May 2013 in parts of Madurai, Virudhunagar, Coonoor, Pollachi and Tiruchirappalli. The major shooting took place in Virudhunagar for nearly 20 days. Further action plots were taken in the town. It was the third film to be shot in Virudhunagar, after Veyil and Renigunta. The film was said to be shot in 4K resolution, making it the second Tamil film after Sivaji.

== Soundtrack ==
Pandiya Naadu

Soundtrack album by D. Imman
- Released: 13 October 2013
- Recorded: 2013
- Genre: Feature film soundtrack
- Length: 37:39
- Language: Tamil
- Label: Think Music
- Producer: D. Imman

D. Imman chronology
Varuthapadatha Valibar Sangam (2013)	Pandiya Naadu (2013)	Jilla (2014)

Singles from Pandiya Naadu
- 1. "Othakada Othakada Machan" Released: 22 September 2013

The soundtrack for Pandiya Naadu was composed by D. Imman collaborating with Suseenthiran and Vishal, for the first time. The audio rights were acquired by Think Music. A single track "Othakada Othakada Machaan" was released on 22 September 2013, at the cultural event held at Loyola Engineering College in Chennai. The audio was launched on 13 October 2013, at Sathyam Cinemas in Chennai, with the presence of the film's cast and crew.

Behindwoods gave 2.75 out of 5 to the album stating "Trademark Imman sounds packed with some amount of punch." Indiaglitz gave 3 out of 5 and stated "Imman score again."

All lyrics are written by Vairamuthu, except the track "Fy Fy Fy Kalaachify", which was written by Madhan Karky.

No.	Title	Singer(s)	Length
1.	"Yaelay Yaelay Marudhu"	Sooraj Santhosh	04:41
2.	"Fy Fy Fy Kalaachify"	Remya Nambeesan	04:11
3.	"Othakada Othakada Machan"	Sooraj Santhosh, Hariharasudhan	04:52
4.	"Verikonda Puli Ondru"	Anand Aravindakshan	05:23
5.	"Daiyare Daiyare"	Anthony Daasan, Palaniammal, Natraj, Pavan	04:23
6.	"Yaelay Yaelay Marudhu" (Karaoke)		04:39
7.	"Othakada Othakada Machan" (Karaoke)		04:10
8.	"Revenge Mode" (Instrumental)		05:20
Total length:			37:39

== Release ==
The satellite rights of the film were secured by Raj TV for ₹10 crore, though Vishal's films were generally brought for ₹6–7 crore as an average. The film was initially given a U/A certificate by the Indian Censor Board, but later it was given a U certificate. Pandiya Naadu released on 2 November alongside Aarambam and All in All Azhagu Raja. It released in 350+ screens in Tamil Nadu, while overseas it released in 70 screens adding up to 1000+ screens worldwide. The film was released in 80 screens in Kerala on 8 November 2013.

== Reception ==
Pandiya Naadu received positive reviews from critics.

=== Critical response ===
The Times of India gave 3.5/5 stars and wrote "Suseenthiran gives us a smartly-written action drama, but the film’s sore point is the romantic track." S. Saraswathi of Rediff gave 3.5/5 stars and wrote "What makes Pandiya Naadu remarkable is the director’s realistic approach and the right amount of commercialism supported by a well-written script, good dialogues, great music and excellent all–round performances."

Behindwoods gave 3.25/5 stars and wrote "Pandiya Naadu is a well written commercial film backed by remarkable performances and lives up to its dark-horse label prior to its release." Baradwaj Rangan of The Hindu wrote "Suseenthiran stages the genre staples well enough — the fight in a bus station; the suspense around an assassination attempt in a theatre — but what he does around these generic scenarios is this movie’s secret strength. That’s what shows that he’s no... ordinary filmmaker."

=== Box office ===
On first day, the film opened to packed house and grossed ₹7.14 crore in its first day. The film collected ₹38.12 lakh from 156 shows in its opening weekend in Chennai and opened behind the other releases Arrambam and All in All Azhagu Raja. After seven weeks, the total collections at the Chennai box office were estimated at ₹3.81 crores and the film was termed a Super hit by Behindwoods.com. The film collected ₹52.35 crore in its full run at the box office. The film grossed ₹50 crore at the box office in its final run.

== Awards and nominations ==
Vijay Awards

- Best Supporting Actor – Bharathiraja, Won
- Best Editor – Anthony, Won
- Best Stunt Director – Anal Arasu, Won
- Best Actor – Vishal, Nominated
- Best Director – Suseenthiran, Nominated
- Best Villain – Sharath Lohitashwa, Nominated
- Best Art Director – Rajeevan, Nominated
- Best Dialogue Writer – Suseenthiran and Baskar Shakthi, Nominated

SIIMA Awards

- Best Debutant Producer – Vishal, Won
- Best Fight Choreographer – Anal Arasu, Won
- Best Actor – Vishal, Nominated
- Best Director – Suseenthiran, Nominated
- Best Supporting Actor – Bharathiraja, Nominated
- Best Actor in a Negative Role – Sharath Lohitashwa, Nominated
- Best Female Playback Singer – Remya Nambeesan For Fy Fy Fy, Nominated
