= Thaamirabharani =

2007 Indian Tamil film

- Poster
- Directed by: Hari
- Written by: Hari
- Produced by: B. Venkatarama Reddy
- Starring: Vishal; Prabhu; Bhanu; Nadhiya
- Cinematography: Priyan
- Edited by: V. T. Vijayan
- Music by: Yuvan Shankar Raja
- Production company: Vijaya Productions
- Release date: 14 January 2007
- Running time: 154 minutes
- Country: India
- Language: Tamil

Thaamirabharani (transl. River of red-coloured leaves) is a 2007 Indian Tamil-language action drama film written and directed by Hari. The film has Vishal and newcomer Bhanu, while Prabhu, Nadhiya, Vijayakumar, Nassar, and Ganja Karuppu play supporting roles. The score and soundtrack were composed by Yuvan Shankar Raja.

The title is derived from the river of the same name, which flows through Thirunelveli and Thoothukudi, where the film is set. Thaamirabharani was released on 14 January 2007 during Pongal.

== Plot ==
Saravana Perumal is a rich salt trader and iron businessman living in Thoothukudi. Subbayya, his son Vellathurai, and his daughter Sakunthala Devi are from Tirunelveli and are his business rivals. Bharani Puthiran is Saravanan's nephew and heir, who has graduated and always roams with his irresponsible friends. Bhanumathi is a college student at Bharani's alma mater. She meets Bharani, falls in love with him, and always pursues him. Bharani learns that Bhanu is Sakunthala Devi's daughter and suspects her behavior, and hence does not reciprocate her love.

One day, Bhanu goes to meet Bharani in Nallathanni Theevu island, off the Indian coast, and everyone gets arrested by the coast guards, who mistake the situation for prostitution. The local police release them, as Bharani is highly influential, but a reporter writes about the event because he has a vendetta against Sakunthala Devi. This angers Subbayya, who misunderstands that Saravanan was the mastermind behind trapping Bhanu in the prostitution case. Subbayya and Vellathurai plan to kill Saravanan, but he escapes. Bharani becomes enraged upon knowing this and goes to kill Vellathurai, but he accidentally chops off the hand of Vellathurai's kindhearted younger brother Selvam. Bharani feels bad about his action.

Saravanan tells Bharani the truth that Sakunthala Devi is none other than his estranged wife, and Bhanu is his own daughter. Sakunthala Devi did not like Saravanan's widowed sister and her son Bharani staying with him, as she wanted him to lead a nuclear family. This led to a fight between Saravanan and Sakunthala Devi, and she left for her father's place. Bharani realizes his mistakes and understands that Bhanu intentionally tried to marry him so the family could reunite. Bharani meets Bhanu, apologizes to her, and both get closer again. Bharani eventually plans to reunite Sakunthala Devi and Saravanan.

Meanwhile, Karmegam, who works for Vellathurai, expresses his interest in marrying Sakunthala Devi with the plan of owning all her wealth. Vellathurai agrees without telling the plans for the wedding. Bharani learns about this and rushes to stop the wedding. Sakunthala Devi is shocked by her brother's perverted intention to marry her to Karmegam and scolds him. A quarrel erupts, and Karmegam seemingly gets killed by Bharani, after which Bharani is sent to prison. Sakunthala Devi realizes her mistake and finally reunites with Saravanan. After four years, Bharani gets released from prison and returns home to find that the wedding arrangements have been made between him and Bhanu.

Bharani refuses to marry Bhanu, saying that Subbayya and Vellathurai are still angry at him for chopping off Selvam's hand, and Bharani insists that Bhanu marry Selvam instead. Finally, Sakunthala Devi reveals the truth that she actually killed Karmegam, and Bharani took the blame and was imprisoned so that she could be saved. Subbayya and Vellathurai overhear the conversation and understand Bharani's good nature. Finally, Bharani and Bhanu marry, and the family reunites.

== Cast ==
- Vishal as Bharani Puthiran aka Kettavan
- Prabhu as Saravana Perumal, Bharani Puthiran's uncle and Bhanumathi's father
- Nadhiya as Shakunthala Devi, Bharani Puthiran's aunt, Saravana Perumal's wife and Bhanumathi's mother
- Muktha (Credited as Bhanu) as Bhanumathi, Bharani Puthiran's cousin and love interest, Saravana Perumal and Shakunthala Devi's daughter
- Nassar as Vellathurai, Shakunthala Devi's second elder brother
- Vijayakumar as P. V. Subbaiya, Shakuntala Devi's father
- Rohini as Pechchikani, Bharani Puthiran's mother and Saravana Perumal's younger sister
- Manorama as Thangapazham, Saravana Perumal & Pechchikani's mother and Bharani Puthiran & Bhanumathi's grandmother
- Nizhalgal Ravi as Thanga Pandi, Shakuntala Devi's first elder brother and Saravana Perumal's best friend
- Ganja Karuppu as Muthu, Bharani Puthiran's cousin
- Sampath Raj as Karmegam, Subbaiya's distant relative
- Aarthi as Meenakshi, Shakunthala Devi's PA
- Akash as Selvam, Shakunthala Devi's younger brother
- Crane Manohar as Shanmugam, Shakunthala Devi's Car Driver
- Meera Krishnan as Lakshmi, Vellathurai's wife
- Bonda Mani as Saattai Shankar
- Citizen Mani as a tea shop customer
- Robo Chandru as Viral Suppi, Bharani Puthiran's friend
- Chaams as Senthil (Adukku Roti), Bharani Puthiran's friend
- Bava Lakshmanan as Bharani and Saravana Perumal's assistant.

== Production ==
The film was launched on 14 July 2006 at Vijaya Gardens. A fight sequence was shot at Chengalpattu while a chase sequence was shot at suburbs of Chennai. One of the song sequences was shot at 32 locations including Nagercoil, Thiruchendur and Coutralam. The filming was completed within 73 days. The song "Karuppana Kaiyala" was shot in a palm grove set in AVM Studios where the crew brought in lorry loads of red sand and fetched a forest of palm trees for it.

== Soundtrack ==
Thaamirabharani

Soundtrack album by Yuvan Shankar Raja
- Released: 22 December 2006
- Recorded: 2006
- Genre: Feature film soundtrack
- Length: 23:49
- Label: Saregama
- Producer: Yuvan Shankar Raja

Yuvan Shankar Raja chronology
Madana (2006)	Thaamirabharani (2006)	Deepavali (2007)

The music was composed by Yuvan Shankar Raja, who teamed up with Vishal for the third time after Sandakozhi (2005) and Thimiru (2006) and Hari for the first time. The soundtrack was released on 22 December 2006. It features five tracks with lyrics penned by Na. Muthukumar and Hari. The song "Karuppana Kaiyale" was adapted from the old devotional song "Karpoora Nayagiye" by L. R. Eswari.

Track listing
No.	Title	Lyrics	Singer(s)	Length
1.	"Karuppaana Kaiyale"	Na. Muthukumar	Ranjith, Roshini	3:28
2.	"Kattabomma Oorenakku"	Na. Muthukumar	Vijay Yesudas	4:51
3.	"Thaaliyae Thevaiyillai"	Hari	Hariharan, Bhavatharini	4:47
4.	"Thiruchendhuru Muruga"	Na. Muthukumar	Naveen Madhav	5:27
5.	"Vaartha Onnu"	Na. Muthukumar	KK	5:16

== Release ==
It was released on 14 January 2007 during Thai Pongal along with Vijay's Pokkiri and Ajith's Aalwar.

=== Critical reception ===
Rediff wrote "Hari has managed to put together a fairly redeemable mixture of action, humour and sentiments, making the movie worth a watch". The Hindu wrote "Hari has a few interesting twists and suspenseful sequences in the narration. The story is not new but it is gripping". Chennai Online wrote "Hari has packaged the film fairly neatly as a wholesome family entertainer, with the right dose of humour, sentiment and action. But there's a sense of deja vu throughout. The plot and situations are what we have seen in many earlier films like 'Kizhakku Cheemayile' and 'Padayappa'". Lajjavathi of Kalki praised the star cast, music, cinematography and stunt choreography and added Hari's screenplay is elegant and stunning along with suspense, there's no lagging.
