= Kulasami =

2023 Indian action thriller film

- Theatrical release poster
- Directed by: Saravana Sakthi
- Written by: Saravana Sakthi; Vijay Sethupathi (Dialogues)
- Produced by: V. Muthukumar; P. IlayaRaja; V. Karthikeyan
- Starring: Vimal; Tanya Hope
- Cinematography: "Wide Angle" Ravi shankaran
- Edited by: Gopi Krishnan
- Music by: "ZEE Star" Mahalingam
- Production company: MIK Productions
- Distributed by: Sanjith Shiva Studios
- Release date: 5 May 2023
- Running time: 121 minutes
- Country: India
- Language: Tamil

Kulasami (transl. Family deity) is a 2023 Indian Tamil-language action thriller film written and directed by Saravana Sakthi. The film stars Vimal and Tanya Hope with Bose Venkat, Saravana Sakthi, S.R. Jankid IPS, Vinodhini Vaidyanathan, Mahanadi Shankar, Muthu Pandi and Jaya Surya portraying supporting roles.

The film was released on 5 May 2023 and received mixed to negative reviews, criticizing the writing although the performances were praised.

== Plot ==
Soora Sangu and his sister Kalaiarasi go to the city from the village; Soora to work as an auto-ricksaw driver while Kalaiarasi aspires to become a doctor. However, tragedy strikes when Kalaiarasi is raped and killed by the men who sexually exploit women. Devastated, Soora Sangu turns into a vigilante to avenge Kalaiarasi's death and save women from being sexually exploited. The rest of the film focuses on how Soora Sangu avenges his sister's death.

== Cast ==
- Vimal as Soora Sangu, an auto-ricksaw driver turned vigilante
- Tanya Hope as Gayathri, a medical college student
- Bose Venkat
- Saravana Sakthi
- S. R. Jankid
- Vinodhini Vaidyanathan as Kannagi, a professor
- Mahanadi Shankar
- Jananai Balu as Mama
- Muthu Pandi as Dharmaraj
- Karnaaraja
- Murugavel
- Rishi
- Hariharan
- Vinoth
- Arun
- Jeya Sooriya
- Sideivel
- Keerthana as Kalaiarasi, Soora Sangu's sister
- Lavanya

== Production ==
The film was produced by V. Muthukumar, P. IlayaRaja and V. Karthikeyan under the banner of MIK Productions. This film is a comeback as director for Kutti Puli film fame actor Saravana Sakthi, who earlier directed the films Dhandayuthapani (2007), Nayagan (2008) and Billa Pandi (2018). The cinematography of the film was done by "Wide Angle" Ravi Chandran, and the editing of the film was done by Gopi Krishnan. Shooting of the film began on 16 October 2020, and the film was delayed due to COVID-19. The dialogues of the film were written by Vijay Sethupathi. This film is the second collaboration between Vimal and Vijay Sethupathi. The stunt sequences of the film were choreographed by Kanal Kannan.

== Music ==
The music for the film was composed by Mahalingam.

Track listing
No.	Title	Lyrics	Singer(s)	Length
1.	"En Thanga Thangachi"	Snehan	VM Mahalingam, Balamurugan, Maanasi	3:43
2.	"Suruttu Nerupu"	Va. Karuppan	Anthony Daasan, VM Mahalingam, Muthusirpi	3:46
Total length:				7:29

== Release ==
The film was originally scheduled to release on 21 April 2023, but was postponed, and it was released theatrically on 5 May 2023.

== Reception ==
Logesh Balachandran of The Times of India gave the film a rating of 2/5 and wrote, "Kulasami fails to tell a compelling story that resonates with the audience. For those seeking a thought-provoking exploration of crimes against women, the film's lack of nuance and subtlety may prove disappointing." A critic from Dinamalar gave the film a rating of 2/5, stating, "The director of the film inspired the story from the 2019 Pollachi sexual assault case and the Professor Nirmala Devi case. Making those incidents into a film might be a very interesting crime thriller that keeps you on the edge of your seat, but this one feels tedious to watch." They also criticized the title Kulasami by calling it "Kulasami-Mudiyala Sami."

A critic from Cinema Vikatan gave a review, stating, "The dialogues are more like TV serial dialogues with poor screenplay, badly written characters, and awkward editing styles that make it feel like a spoof film instead of a thriller film." Prashanth Vallavan of Cinema Express gave the film a rating of 1.5/5 and wrote, "Kulasami could be entertaining if you know how to extract humour out of the absurd moments and have the patience to sit through the dull, over-indulgent scenes."
