= Dikkiloona =

2021 film directed by Karthik Yogi

- Official release poster
- Directed by: Karthik Yogi
- Written by: Karthik Yogi
- Produced by: Kotapadi J Rajesh; K. S. Sinish
- Starring: Santhanam; Anagha; Shirin Kanchwala; Yogi Babu; Harbhajan Singh; Rajendran; Anandaraj; Shah Ra
- Cinematography: Arvi
- Edited by: Jomin Mathew
- Music by: Yuvan Shankar Raja
- Production companies: KJR Studios; Soldiers Factory
- Distributed by: ZEE5
- Release date: 10 September 2021
- Running time: 144 minutes
- Country: India
- Language: Tamil

Dikkiloona is a 2021 Indian Tamil-language science fiction comedy film written and directed by Karthik Yogi in his directoral debut . The film stars Santhanam in a triple role alongside, Anagha and Shirin Kanchwala, while Yogi Babu, Harbhajan Singh, Rajendran and Anandaraj play supporting roles. The film features music composed by Yuvan Shankar Raja, with cinematography and editing were performed respectively by Arvi and Jomin. The film was released on ZEE5 on 10 September 2021, coinciding with the occasion of Ganesh Chaturthi, and received mixed to positive reviews from critics.

== Plot ==
In 2027, Mani, an ex-hockey player leads a stressful married life. He is not on good terms with his wife Priya and his parents-in-law as he did not achieve success as a hockey player and instead works as a lineman for a meagre salary. Mani with help of his friend Albert, who works as a cleaner in a scientists team who work on making a time travel device to work, travels through time in backwards just 2 days before his wedding with Priya in the year 2020. Mani introduces himself to his past version as EB Mani and the groom Mani does not believe him and rather doubts he must be a doppelganger born out of his father's illicit relationship. But when Mani reveals about few things which he only knew, groom Mani believes him. EB Mani demands him to stop the marriage but groom Mani refuses. EB Mani blackmails him with a video and tells if he does not stop his marriage, he will circulate the video to everyone. EB Mani also gives his exit watch to groom Mani and tells him to travel to his future in 2027 so that he will understand why he insists to stop the wedding. Groom Mani travels to 2027. He is shocked to see his then wife Priya not having a good relationship with him and his family. His parents-in-law are also not giving any respect. He has not achieved in Hockey and works only as an ordinary technician in the Electricity board. Groom Mani is devastated that Priya regrets marrying him and tells him that had this marriage not happened both of them would have led a happy life elsewhere. Groom Mani also understands that Priya's friend Meghna is the woman who will be an apt wife for him as she is so supportive of him even during his downfall. She had also divorced her husband Karthik who she thinks is unworthy of her. Groom Mani returns to 2020 and stops the marriage with Priya and proposes to Meghna (Groom Mani intervenes during the timeline of Meghna being proposed to by Karthik).

EB Mani is now in the new timeline in 2027. He is happy that he had achieved as hockey player but shocked that he is in final stage of divorce with Meghna. Mani drops the divorce proposal without knowing why he filed for divorce and both start to live together again. Mani now understands why he filed for divorce. Meghna is a spoilt brat from rich family. She always wants to be in limelight and goes to any extent together with her so-called boy bestie to gain likes in social media Tik-tok which reflects in his career when he loses his national team selection match. EB Mani is neither able to live with Meghna nor able to change her. He regrets his decision of changing the past. He tries to get in contact with Priya who is now working in a small restaurant as waitress shocking Mani. Priya apologizes to him for forcing him to marry her when she knew he is not willing to. She is feeling guilty of aborting their child after the wedding was stopped. EB Mani now decides to change everything back to normal again. With help of Albert in the new timeline, he once again invokes the time travel machine to go to the same day when he tried to stop the wedding. However, one of the scientists is angry at him for using the device for his personal benefit, and therefore tampers with the machine half way during his travel which leads to EB Mani ending up in a mental asylum.

After much struggles in mental asylum he arrives on time when EB Mani has sent groom Mani to 2027 and groom Mani returns to 2020 after his time travel. Both Manis are surprised to see their alternate self introducing him as Goundamani. Groom Mani is confused as EB Mani urges to stop the wedding while new Mani tells not to make changes in the original timeline after he explains about his experiences in new timeline. When groom Mani refuses to marry Priya, new Mani tells that Priya is pregnant and she is not as bad as understood by them. Groom Mani goes to Priya just few minutes before the marriage and confesses that he may or may not be a successful person in future and if she is willing to accept him still, they can marry. While waiting in mandap regarding the decision, Priya arrives to mandap to Mani's surprise. She tells she is ready to marry him because he told her the truth. Priya and Mani happily marry. EB Mani and new Mani disappear to their new timeline. Meghna is proposed to by Karthik.

In new 2027 Mani sees himself as successful hockey player, father of a daughter and Priya as his wife screaming at him for silly reasons. This time Mani is not irritated by her and rather sees her in different perspective.

== Cast ==
- Santhanam in a triple role as
  - Hockey Player Mani
  - EB Mani
  - Mappillai Mani
- Anagha as Priya
- Shirin Kanchwala as Meghna
- Munishkanth as Arivu
- Yogi Babu as Albert aka Albert Einstein and mental doctor's wife (photo appearance only)
- Arun Alexander as Dr. Stanford/Transpa
- Anandaraj as Arivu's Boss
- Rajendran as Mental Hospital Doctor
- Maaran as Kumar aka Escape mental, Mental Hospital Patient
- Raj Krishnan as Dr. Roshan
- Seshu as Build up mental, Mental hospital Patient
- Nizhalgal Ravi as the narrator of the story, Mental Hospital Patient
- Shah Ra as Karthik
- Chitra Lakshmanan as L. Gopal, Priya's Father
- Madhan Bob as Mani's Father
- Anjali Devi as Mani's Mother
- Rindhu Ravi as Priya's mother
- Thangadurai as Karthik's henchman
- Prashanth Rangaswamy as Pappu, The boy bestie of Meghna
- Jangiri Madhumitha as Lawyer Madhu
- Harbhajan Singh as Sardesh Singh (Cameo appearance)

== Production ==
=== Development ===
On 5 September 2019, KJR Studios announced its collaboration with K. S. Sinish's newly formed production house Soldiers Factory, for a science fiction comedy film titled Dikkiloona, and further stated that Santhanam will star in the film in triple roles for the first time, as protagonist, antagonist as well as a comedian. The film also features him in the nude for a scene. The film's title was inspired from the word "Dikkilona" which was used by Goundamani and Senthil in the film Gentleman (1993).

=== Casting ===
In October 2019, the makers announced that former Indian cricketer Harbhajan Singh would play the supporting role in the project, eventually marking his debut in Tamil cinema. The following month, Anagha who played lead role in Natpe Thunai was cast in the female lead role alongside Shirin Kanchwala. Munishkanth, Anandaraj, Yogi Babu, Rajendran and Nizhalgal Ravi, Shah Ra and Arun Alexander joined the cast in the same month, along with film critic Prasanth Rangaswamy, in his acting debut.

=== Filming ===
The principal photography of the film commenced in November 2019 with the film being mostly set in Chennai. Harbhajan Singh began shooting for his portion of the film in December 2019. The filming was wrapped up in March 2020 before the COVID-19 lockdown in India.

== Music ==
Dikkiloona

Soundtrack album by Yuvan Shankar Raja
- Released: 6 September 2021
- Recorded: 2020–2021
- Genre: Feature film soundtrack
- Length: 12:32
- Language: Tamil
- Label: Sony Music
- Producer: Yuvan Shankar Raja

Yuvan Shankar Raja chronology
Kasada Thapara (2021)	Dikkiloona (2021)	Maanaadu (2021)

Singles from Dikkiloona
- 1. "Per Vachalum Vaikama Ponalum" Released: 3 September 2021

The music for the film is composed by Yuvan Shankar Raja, collaborating for the first time with Santhanam after the latter's transformation into lead roles, with lyrics written by Ku. Karthik, Arunraja Kamaraj and Saravedi Saran. Yuvan remixed a popular classical song Per Vachalum Vaikama Ponalum from Michael Madana Kama Rajan (1990) which was composed by his father Ilaiyaraaja, and was released as a single on 3 September 2021. The full album was released by Sony Music India on 6 September 2021.

Track listing
No.	Title	Lyrics	Singer(s)	Length
1.	"Cycle Wheela Pola"	Arunraja Kamaraj	Jithin Raj	3:24
2.	"Manja Colouru Kuruvi"	Saravedi Saran	Shyam Vishwanathan	2:41
3.	"Per Vachalum Vaikama Ponalum"	Vaali	Malaysia Vasudevan, S. Janaki	4:28
4.	"Yedhum Solladhe"	Ku. Karthik	Yuvan Shankar Raja	1:58
Total length:				12:32

== Release ==
The film was initially supposed to have its theatrical release in April 2020 but was called off due to the COVID-19 pandemic in India. KJR Studios announced that the film would be released via over-the-top media service. The film released on ZEE5 on 10 September 2021, coinciding with the occasion of Ganesh Chaturthi.

== Reception ==
Baradwaj Rangan wrote for Film Companion,"The film doesn’t use the time machine concept well nor is it a great vehicle for a leading man." M Suganth of The Times of India gave 3.0 out of 5 stars and stated that "The supporting comedians, especially Anandaraj, Munishkanth and Lollu Sabha Maran, are amusing. It is these scenes that rescue the film and make us wonder if this material would have worked better if the director had chosen to make it as an out-and-out comedy. In its present state, it is merely diverting fare that you forget once it ends."

== Controversies ==
Santhanam's mockery of disabled people in the film was met with harsh condemnation from various social activists.
