= PT Sir =

- Theatrical release poster
- Directed by: Karthik Venugopalan
- Written by: Karthik Venugopalan
- Produced by: Ishari K. Ganesh
- Starring: Hiphop Tamizha; Kashmira Pardeshi; Anikha Surendran
- Cinematography: Madhesh Manickam
- Edited by: Prasanna GK
- Music by: Hiphop Tamizha
- Production company: Vels Films International
- Release date: 24 May 2024
- Country: India
- Language: Tamil

PT Sir (transl. Physical Training Sir) is a 2024 Indian Tamil-language action drama film written and directed by Karthik Venugopalan, and produced by Ishari K. Ganesh. The film stars Adhi of Hiphop Tamizha in the titular role, alongside Kashmira Pardeshi, Anikha Surendran, Prabhu, K. Bhagyaraj, Ilavarasu, Pandiarajan, Thiagarajan and Munishkanth.

The film was officially announced in November 2022 under the tentative title HHT7, as it is Aadhi's seventh film as the lead actor, and the official title was announced in January 2023. Principal photography commenced the same month. It was predominantly shot in Chennai and Erode, and wrapped by late-February 2024. The film has music composed by Hiphop Tamizha, cinematography handled by Madesh Manickam and editing by Prasanna GK.

PT Sir was theatrically release on 24 May 2024. The film received mixed to positive reviews from critics and become a decent hit at the box-office.

== Plot ==
Kanagavel is a young Physical Education teacher in a school in Erode. His mother Eswari strictly forbids him from involving in any social issues as an astrologer predicted that it will be fatal for him. The PT master is in love with teacher Vanathi and the couple's engagement is fixed. Meanwhile, a young girl named Nandhini, a college going neighbour of Kanagavel, is molested by unknown men and, though not getting involved in the issue, he advises her to move on. On the engagement day however, Nandhini commits suicide and in spite of his mother's warnings, Kanagavel files a case of murder accusing the college chairman, GP Guru Purushothaman. It is then revealed that Purushothaman himself had sexually abused Nandini which she commits suicide. Eventually it is revealed in the courtroom that Nandhini actually didn't die and had faked it so that she can successfully convince the police officers to arrest GP. The judge believes her and GP was sentenced to life imprisonment. Kanagavel finally becomes happy where he and Vanathi gets married.

== Cast ==
- Hiphop Tamizha Adhi as Kanagavel
- Kashmira Pardeshi as Vaanathi (Voice dubbed by Savitha Reddy)
- Prabhu as Advocate Manickavel, Vaanathi's father
- K. Bhagyaraj as a judge (special appearance)
- Thiagarajan as Guru Purushothaman (G.P.), College Chairman
- Anikha Surendran as Nandhini Rathinam (Voice dubbed by Akshaya Prabha)
- Pandiarajan as Selvaraj K.
- Munishkanth as Marimuthu
- Ilavarasu as Rathinam, Nandhini's father
- Devadarshini as Eswari, Kanagavel's mother
- Pattimandram Raja as Kanagavel's father
- Vinodhini Vaidyanathan as Nandhini's mother
- Pranika Dhakshu as Kanagavel's sister
- Abi Nakshathra as Nandhini's younger sister
- Nakkalites Dhanam as School staff member
- Don Don Star as Colony secretary
- Jeyachandan as Inspector
- Kamalesh as Nandhini's younger brother
- Hello Kandasamy as constable
- Madhuvanti Arun as Aadhirai Arunachalam, GP's lawyer (special appearance)

Uncredited

- K. S. G. Venkatesh as priest
- Chutti Aravind as mortuary doctor
- RJ Vigneshkanth as advocate (cameo appearance)

== Production ==
On 14 November 2022, Aadhi, who is a part of the musical duo Hiphop Tamizha, was announced to star in a venture directed by Karthik Venugopalan, who previously directed Nenjamundu Nermaiyundu Odu Raja (2019), and produced by Vels Films International LTD, headed by Ishari K. Ganesh. Tentatively titled HHT7, a muhurat puja was held the following day in Chennai with the presence of the cast and crew. The official title PT Sir was announced on 12 January 2023. Principal photography began with the first schedule on 22 November 2022 in Chennai. In February 2023, production moved to Erode. Filming wrapped by late February 2024.

== Music ==
The music and background score is composed by Hiphop Tamizha.

No.	Title	Lyrics	Singer(s)	Length
1.	"Kutty Pisasae"	Hiphop Tamizha	Hiphop Tamizha	2:57
2.	"Nakkal Pudichavan"	Vignesh Srikanth	Hiphop Tamizha, Rihana	3:51
3.	"Poraadu Sirage"	Vignesh Srikanth	Kaushik Krish, Hiphop Tamizha	3:25
4.	"Tonta Toin"	Hiphop Tamizha	Hiphop Tamizha	3:03
5.	"Kanagavel Kaaka"	Muthamil	Hiphop Tamizha, V. M. Mahalingam, Kaushik Krish	2:30

== Release ==
=== Theatrical ===
PT Sir was theatrically released on 24 May 2024.

=== Home media ===
The streaming rights were acquired by Amazon Prime Video, where it began streaming from 21 June 2024.

== Reception ==
=== Critical response ===
Roopa Radhakrishnan of The Times of India gave 2.5/5 stars and wrote "It is a credit to Devadarshini’s performance that we are able to get past that and invest in the mother-son relationship between her and Adhi". Bhuvanesh Chandar of The Hindu wrote "It just so happens that any PR against victim-blaming might be good PR for our social media times, and you hope, at least, that the lesson from this PT Sir reaches its intended ears". Manigandan KR of Times Now gave 3/5 stars and wrote "The film not only entertains, it also looks to create an awareness on certain behavioural patterns prevalent in society that inadvertently affect victims of sexual crimes".

Harshini S V of Film Companion wrote, "The film may not have been a happy ride as far as the watching experience is concerned, but to have conveyed a message about victim blaming, without diluting its seriousness, does leave you hoping that the message reaches the masses". Narayani M of Cinema Express gave 2/5 stars and wrote "The film does little more than blow the whistle for PT Sir's meteoric rise to bring justice to womenfolk". Anusha Sundar of OTTPlay gave 1.5/5 stars and wrote "PT Sir is forgettable, thankfully for its benefit, because the film's process of uplifting womankind only makes way for men to show their heroism. And all that I would say after watching the film is, let’s not milk feminism and women's empowerment anymore".

=== Box office ===
PT Sir grossed over ₹12.25 crore in 12 days of its release.
