= Ullasam =

Ullasam may refer to:

- Ullaasam, a 1997 Indian Tamil-language romantic action film
- Ullasam (2022 film), an Indian Malayalam-language romantic comedy film
