= Marijuana (2020 film) =

- Official poster
- Directed by: MD Anand
- Written by: MD Anand
- Produced by: MD Vijay
- Starring: Rishi Rithvik; Asha Parthalom
- Cinematography: Bala Rosaiya
- Edited by: MD Vijay
- Music by: Karthick
- Production company: Third Eye Creations
- Distributed by: Thamizh Thai Koodam
- Release date: 13 March 2020
- Running time: 122 minutes
- Country: India
- Language: Tamil

Marijuana is a 2020 Indian Tamil-language crime thriller film directed by MD Anand. The film stars Rishi Rithvik and Asha Parthalom, with Srinivasan, Rajesh, and Madurai Joseph in supporting roles. The music was composed by Karthick Guru, while cinematography was handled by Bala Rosaiya and editing by MD Vijay. The film was released on 14 November 2020.

== Plot ==
A minister’s son and a theater employee are mysteriously killed. Guru, a police officer, takes charge of the case. While investigating the case deeply, a few more murders occur. Guru discovers that the killer is a single individual. The clue he uncovers is marijuana, which links all the cases together. The identity of the murderer and their motive form the rest of the story.

== Cast ==
- Rishi Rithvik as Guru
- Asha Parthalom as Chitra
- Srinivasan as Theater Owner
- Rajesh as Vijay
- Madurai Joseph as Commissioner
- Bijili Ramesh in a special appearance
- Aparna as Chitra's mother
- Vinay as Pandian
- Shanmugam as Moorthy
- Regan as Sub-Inspector
- R. K. Nagaraj as Vicky
- Yuvaraj as Stephen
- K. Anand Kumar as Theater Worker
- Janani as Jenny
- Roslyn as Priyanka
- K. Raj as Vijay's father

== Reception ==
A critic from Chennai Online wrote that "Rishi, who comes as a Police officer, has given a fantastic performance". Maalai Malar critic noted that "Rishi, who is playing the hero in the film, has done his job well".
