= A. Tamil Selvan =

Indian film director

A.Tamil Selvan
- Born: Tamil Nadu, India
- Occupation: Film director
- Years active: 2017–present

A.Tamil Selvan is an Indian film director who has directed Tamil-language films. He made his debut with the film Kida Virunthu (2017) after which he made Udhay Art of Love (2019) and Kaayam (2021). our next film was thotram (2024)

== Career ==
Tamil Selvan made his directorial debut through the action drama Kida Virunthu (2017), featuring Ganja Karuppu, G. M. Kumar and S. P. Prasadh. He worked on the story, screenplay, dialogue, and lyrics for the film.

The film opened to mixed reviews, with a reviewer from Maalai Malar "Director A Tamil Selvan has given the film the title Kida Virundhu, which is known as a village feast. He attempted to provide the picture without altering the smell of the soil. The film contains numerous instances of reality violations." His next film, Udhay Art of Love, was released in 2019 and starred Kadhal Sukumar, and Nellai Siva.

Tamil Selvan began working on Kaayam in 2021. After a year, Tamil Selvan's film Vizhithelu got mixed reviews. A critic from Dina Thanthi said, "Director A. Tamil Selvan tells the story with a sense of responsibility and moves the scenes briskly to raise awareness about internet scams."

== Filmography ==
As Director
Year	Film	Note
2017	Kida Virunthu	
2019	Udhay Art of Love	
2021	Kaayam	
2023	Vizhithelu	
