= Munishkanth =

Indian actor (born 1978)

- Born: Ramdoss; 30 June 1978 (age 48); Nilakottai, Dindigul, Tamil Nadu, India
- Occupation: Actor
- Years active: 2003–present
- Spouse: Thenmozhi (m. 2018)

Ramdoss (born 1978), better known as Munishkanth, is an Indian actor and comedian who appears in Tamil language films. He rose to fame for his role as Munishkanth in Mundasupatti (2014) and has since used the character name as his stage name. His other notable performances include Maanagaram (2017), Maragadha Naanayam (2017), and Ratsasan (2018).

== Career ==
Ramdoss came to Chennai from Nilakottai in 2002, hoping to get a breakthrough as an actor in films and worked for several years as a junior artiste. Unable to get an immediate breakthrough, he moved to Malaysia for two years to work as a goldsmith before returning to Chennai and often slept homeless at Vadapalani temple. He became involved in short films, often portraying characters in the Naalaya Iyakkunar show on Kalaignar TV, and featured in Ram's original award-winning short film titled Mundasupatti by dubbing for the character of the aspiring actor, Munishkanth, at the insistence of his friend Kaali Venkat.

He continued on the fringe of the film industry, appearing in small roles in Mani Ratnam's Kadal (2013) and C. V. Kumar's Soodhu Kavvum (2013) and Pizza 2: Villa (2013), before being given the chance to portray Munishkanth in Ram's feature film debut Mundasupatti (2014). The film became a critical and commercial success, with Ramdoss portrayal being highly acclaimed by critics. He has since been popularly known as "Munishkanth". He has since worked on films including 10 Endrathukulla (2015), Pasanga 2 (2015) and Maragadha Naanayam (2017). He rose to more fame after acting in crime mystery thriller Ratsasan (2018) alongside Vishnu Vishal. He is part of Karthik Subbaraj's Petta (2019) starring Rajinikanth. He was seen in ZEE5’s Postman (2019), which has an ardent Rajini fan as the lead character, and the series is filled with references to the Superstar. Munishkanth has gone beyond his usual comedic appearance and has revealed himself in a highly emotional character in the film Middle Class (2025).

== Filmography ==
=== Films ===
List of Munishkanth film credits
Year	Film	Role	Notes
2003	Kadhal Kirukkan	Servant	Uncredited
2007	Aalwar	Punyamoorthy's henchman	Uncredited
2008	Kaalai	Villager	Uncredited
2008	Arai En 305-il Kadavul	Raana Singh's henchman	
2009	Aarupadai	Henchman	Uncredited
2009	Eesa	Fisherman	Uncredited
2011	Thambikottai	Beeda Pandiamma's henchman	Uncredited
2011	Yuddham Sei	Beep show stripper	Uncredited
2011	Veppam	Ammaji's henchman	
2011	Eththan	Lender	
2012	Aachariyangal	Police Inspector	
2013	Kadal	Masilamani	
2013	Kantha	Henchman	credited as Ram
2013	Soodhu Kavvum	Drug seller	
2013	Neram	Rayban's sidekick	Uncredited; simultaneously shot in Malayalam
2013	Neram	Dhandapani's sidekick	Uncredited; simultaneously shot in Malayalam
2013	Pizza 2: Villa	Buyer	
2014	Mundasupatti	Muniskanth	
2014	Jigarthanda	Actor	
2014	Megha	Joseph Fernando's henchmen	
2015	Enakkul Oruvan	Drug Dealer	
2015	Indru Netru Naalai	Actor	
2015	Aavi Kumar	Exorcist	
2015	10 Endrathukulla	Driving School Owner	
2015	144	Surya	
2015	Pasanga 2	Kathir	
2016	Pokkiri Raja	Munusu	
2016	Mapla Singam	Mahesh Babu	
2016	Sawaari	Kumar	
2016	Darling 2	Valparai Varadhan	
2016	Oru Naal Koothu	Ganesan	
2016	Thirunaal	Tips	
2016	Mo	Joseph Chellappa	
2017	Maanagaram	Winnings	Won—Ananda Vikatan Cinema Award for Best Comedian; Won—Norway Tamil Film Festival Award for Best Comedian
2017	Bruce Lee	God Father	
2017	Bongu	Mani	
2017	Maragadha Naanayam	'Nochchukuppam' Ramdoss	Won—Ananda Vikatan Cinema Award for Best Comedian
2017	Chennaiyil Oru Naal 2	Ranjith	
2017	Velaikkaran	Karpaga Vinayagam	
2018	Gulaebaghavali	Munish	
2018	Kalakalappu 2	Muthukumar	
2018	Seyal	Kumar	
2018	Pyaar Prema Kaadhal	Thangaraj	
2018	Ratsasan	Doss	
2018	Sandakozhi 2	Murugan	
2018	Kalavani Mappillai	Villangam	
2018	Kanaa	Inspector Patchamuthu	
2018	Adanga Maru	Constable Ramadass	
2019	Petta	Chittu	
2019	Watchman	Bala's uncle	
2019	Petromax	Senthil	
2019	Market Raja MBBS	Gunaseelan	
2019	Irandam Ulagaporin Kadaisi Gundu	Puncture (alias) Subbaiah	
2019	Dhanusu Raasi Neyargale	Karupasamy	
2020	Naan Sirithal	Manikkam	
2020	Ettuthikkum Para	Pattakkathi	
2020	Walter	Journalist	
2020	Ka Pae Ranasingam	Ranasingam's friend	
2021	Eeswaran	Maragathamani	
2021	Dikkiloona	Arivu	
2021	Vinodhaya Sitham	Krishnamoorthy	
2021	Bachelor	Lanthus	
2021	Murungakkai Chips	Daas	
2021	Plan Panni Pannanum	Singam	
2022	Clap	Babu	Simultaneously shot in Telugu
2022	Hostel	Saathappan	
2022	Don	Professor Azhagu	
2022	Nadhi	Manikkam	
2022	The Legend	Vasanthan Perumal	
2022	Cadaver	Michael	
2022	Thiruchitrambalam	Subbaraj (Mama)	
2022	Trigger	Killi	
2022	Sardar	Paavadaisami (Chithapa)	
2022	Yugi	Kokki Kumar	
2022	Agent Kannayiram	Kumarappan	
2022	Gatta Kusthi	Ganesan	
2022	Naai Sekar Returns	Inspector Arumugam	
2022	Laththi	Constable Panneer Selvan	
2023	Thugs	Marudhu	
2023	Tamilarasan	Ganesh Kumar	
2023	Kazhuvethi Moorkkan	Unmai	
2023	Veeran	Perusu	
2023	Takkar	Oram	
2023	Infinity	Sokku	
2023	Kaadapura Kalaikuzhu	Pavadasamy	
2023	DD Returns	Bheem	
2023	80s Buildup	Chitra Gupta	
2023	Odavum Mudiyadhu Oliyavum Mudiyadhu	Dharmaraj	
2024	Ayalaan	Police Inspector	
2024	Marakkuma Nenjam	Karthikeyan	
2024	Double Tuckerr	Left	
2024	Inga Naan Thaan Kingu	Body Balram	
2024	PT Sir	Marimuthu	
2024	Hit List	Police Inspector	
2024	Maharaja	Constable Kuzhandhaivelu	
2024	Vasco Da Gama	Vasudevan's uncle	
2024	Kadaisi Ulaga Por	Encounter Dass	
2025	Perusu	Singaram	
2025	Gangers	Singaraj	
2025	Padai Thalaivan		
2025	Jenma Natchathiram	Murugesan	
2025	Surrender		
2025	Others	Sub-inspector Gajendran	
2025	Madharas Mafia Company		
2025	Middle Class	Karl Marx	
2025	Rajini Gaang	Yogi	
2025	Kombuseevi	Padayappa	
2026	Kaakaa		
2026	Thiraivi	Crime Branch Inspector Anbarasan	
2026	Red Label		
2026	Mylanji	Ethiraj	
2026	Thaai Kizhavi	Pennycuick	
2026	Vadam		
2026	Nooru Saami	Police Inspector	
2026	Gatta Kusthi 2	Ganesan	
2026	Battle		
2026	Ram and Leela		
2026	Sardar 2	Paavadaisami	
2026	Meesaya Murukku 2	Sundaram	

Key
†	Denotes films that have not yet been released

=== Television ===
List of Munishkanth web series credits
Year	Title	Role	Platform	Notes
2002–2005	Metti Oli	Garment worker	Sun TV	
2019	Postman	Raja	ZEE5	Nominated—Blacksheep Digital Awards 2020 Best Actor in a supporting role
2022	Vilangu	SI Uthaman	ZEE5	
2026	Kaakee Circus		ZEE5	
