= Zombie (2019 film) =

2019 Indian film by Bhuvan Nullan

- Theatrical release poster
- Directed by: Bhuvan Nullan
- Written by: Bhuvan Nullan
- Produced by: Vasanth Mahalingam; V. Muthukumar
- Starring: Yogi Babu; Yashika Aannand
- Cinematography: Vishushri K
- Edited by: Dinesh Ponraj
- Music by: Premgi Amaren
- Production company: S3 Pictures
- Release date: 6 September 2019
- Running time: 125 minutes
- Country: India
- Language: Tamil

Zombie is a 2019 Indian Tamil-language zombie comedy film produced by Vasanth Mahalingam and V. Muthukumar under their production banner S3 Pictures. The film is written and directed by Bhuvan Nullan. Yogi Babu and Yashika Aannand have featured in the lead roles, while Manobala, Gopi, Sudhakar and Anbu Thasan have played pivotal roles. Premgi Amaren has composed the music for the film. This film received highly negative reviews from audiences and critics.

== Plot ==
This story revolves around friends who plan to go on vacation after getting tired of their day-to-day lives. Meanwhile, when they try to escape from that boring hectic life they get attacked by zombies on their vacation and struggle a lot to save their lives and in this hush they meet Aishwarya (Yashika Aannand).

== Cast ==
- Yogi Babu as Gangster Pistol Raj
- Yashika Aannand as Aishwarya
- Anbu Thasan as Gautham
- Parithabangal Gopi as Singh (Singaravelan)
- Parithabangal Sudhakar as Chinna Thambi
- Bijili Ramesh as Petta Philips
- T. M. Karthik as MSD
- John Vijay as Inspector Panner Selvam
- Manobala as Chinna Thambi's Father in law
- TikTok Chitra Kajal as Yashika's Professor
- Dhuniya Sudhakar
- Lokesh Pop as Don's assistant
- Kutty Gopi
- Aishwarya Palani
- Elakkiya as the bride for Gautham
- Lollu Sabha Manohar
- Adithya Kathir as hacker
- Premgi Amaren (special appearance in "Are You Okay Baby")
- Shanaya Daphne Alicia Neha

== Production ==
The film wrapped up shoot in the first week of March 2019. The film is like Miruthan by Jayam Ravi whereas Miruthan is a zombie-thriller film but this film is a comedy-zombie film.

== Soundtrack ==
No.	Title	Singer(s)	Length (m:ss)
1	Are You Okay Baby	Anthony Daasan, Pravin Saivi, Premji Amaren, Kharesma Ravichandran, Swagatha S. Krishnan	05:12

== Marketing and release ==
The official teaser of the film was unveiled on 7 June 2019. The official trailer of the film was unveiled by Lahari Music and T-Series on 21 August 2019.

The film was released theatrically on 6 September 2019.
