= Rajmohan Arumugam =

Indian comedian, YouTuber, social media influencer and politician

Cabinet Minister Government of Tamil Nadu
- Incumbent
- Assumed office 10 May 2026
- Governor: R. V. Arlekar
- Chief Minister: C. Joseph Vijay
- Ministry and Departments: School Education; Tamil Development and Information

Member of the Tamil Nadu Legislative Assembly
- Incumbent
- Assumed office 4 May 2026
- Preceded by: I. Paranthamen
- Constituency: Egmore

Personal details
- Party: Tamilaga Vetri Kazhagam
- Occupation: Actor; standup comedian; content creator; politician

Rajmohan Arumugam is an Indian Politician, member of legislative assembly of Tamilnadu. He is the propaganda secretary of Tamilaga Vettri Kazhagam. He is well known for his contents focusing on social awareness and for his fluency in Tamil-language during his motivational speeches.

== Television and film career ==
He took part in television reality program Tamil Pechu Engal Moochu aired in Star Vijay, and became famous after winning the second season during the 2008–09 season. He participated in Tamil Pechu Engal Moochu.

In 2017, following the suicide of medical aspirant Anitha who opposed the NEET exam, Rajmohan released a widely circulated video titled Who Killed Anitha on the YouTube channel Put Chutney. In the video, he criticized the political establishment, questioned systemic inequalities in education, and condemned societal apathy, calling Anitha's death a result of collective failure. One of his notable video contents which he uploaded in Put Chutney tackled the subject matter pertaining to the political blame game between the two southern Indian states Tamil Nadu and Karnataka which was on the peak surrounding around the 2018 Tamil Nadu protests for Kaveri water sharing. In 2018, Vijay Devarakonda collaborated with Rajmohan for a promotional video ahead of the former's theatrical release of film NOTA, which was unveiled in the Put Chutney YouTube channel.

He also had stint as a judge and as a mentor in standup comedy oriented show Comicstaan Semma Comedy Pa which was a Tamil version of the original version of Hindi-language comedy show Comicstaan. During the onset of the peak COVID-19 pandemic, he switched his focused on activism by launching a YouTube channel specially dedicated towards the college students whose studies were impacted by the global pandemic. He began the YouTube channel with the aim of conveying the prevalence of the most pressing social issues and documenting them in a simple and in a convenient style by adapting the routine conversation style.

In 2023, he made his directorial debut with the film Baba Black Sheep, which opened to mixed to negative reviews criticising the outdated storyline and illogical scenarios about the school life.

== Filmography ==
=== Films ===
As actor

- Velaiilla Pattadhari 2 (2017)
- Nenjamundu Nermaiyundu Odu Raja (2019)
- Ispade Rajavum Idhaya Raniyum (2019)
- Natpe Thunai (2019)
- Marina Puratchi (2019)
- Naan Sirithal (2020)
- Baba Black Sheep (2023; also director)
- Flash Back (2025)

=== Television ===
- Tamil Pechu Engal Moochu (2008–09)
- Batman Returns... To Chennai | The Middle Ages (2015)
- Comicstaan Semma Comedy Pa (2020)
- Fall (2022)

== Electoral performance ==
2026 Tamil Nadu Legislative Assembly election: Egmore
Party	Candidate	Votes	%	±%
TVK	Rajmohan Arumugam	53,901	45.02	New
DMK	Tamilan Prasanna	43,097	35.99	▼22.30
AIADMK	Abhishek Rangasamy	18,191	15.19	▼10.27
NTK	Saranya	2,522	2.11	▼3.20
NOTA	NOTA	695	0.58	▼0.42
Margin of victory		10,804	9.02	▼23.81
Turnout		1,19,738		
Registered electors		1,38,775		
TVK gain from DMK		Swing	▲45.02	
