= Vizhithelu =

- Theatrical release poster
- Directed by: A. Tamil Selvan
- Written by: A. Tamil Selvan
- Produced by: CM. Durai Anand
- Starring: Ashok Kumar; Gayatri Rema
- Cinematography: Sambath Kumar.A
- Edited by: S.R. Muthu Kumaran
- Music by: Nalla Thambi
- Release date: 3 March 2023
- Country: India
- Language: Tamil

Vizhithelu (transl. Wake up) is a 2023 Indian Tamil-language action thriller film directed by A. Tamil Selvan. The film stars Ashok Kumar, Gayatri Rema in the lead roles with Billy Murali, Salem Saravanan, Saravana Sakthi, Paruthiveeran Sujatha and Vinodhini Vaidyanathan portraying supporting roles. The film was released theatrically on 3 March 2023.

== Plot ==
The film is based on online gambling and developed around the theme of internet fraud.

== Cast ==
- Ashok Kumar as Sivakumar
- Gayatri Rema
- Billy Murali
- Salem Saravanan
- M. S. Bhaskar
- Saravana Sakthi
- Paruthiveeran Sujatha
- Vinodhini Vaidyanathan
- Ravi Mariya
- Chaplin Balu
- Ranjan
- Manimaran

== Production ==
The film's first look was released by Nakkheeran editor Nakkeeran Gopal and director S. A. Chandrasekhar. The film's audio launch took place on 12 January 2023.

== Reception ==
The film was released on 3 March 2023 across Tamil Nadu. A critic from Dina Thanthi wrote that director Tamil Selvan tells the story with a sense of responsibility and moves the scenes briskly to raise awareness about internet scams.
