= Regai =

- Genre: Thriller; Crime; Police procedural
- Based on: Rajesh Kumar ‘Regai’
- Written by: M. Dhinakaran (dialogues)
- Directed by: M. Dhinakaran
- Starring: Bala Hasan; Pavithra Janani; Anjali Rao; Vinodhini Vaidyanathan
- Country of origin: India
- Original language: Tamil
- No. of seasons: 1

Production
- Producer: S. Singaravelan
- Running time: approx. 20–30 minutes per episode
- Production company: S.S Group

Original release
- Network: ZEE5
- Release: 28 November 2025

Regai is a 2025 Indian Tamil-language Crime Thriller Police procedural streaming series written and directed by M. Dhinakaran for ZEE5. Produced by S. Singaravelan under the banner of S.S Group. It is based on the novel of the same name by Rajesh Kumar. The series follows several Tamil Nadu Police Sub-inspector and Constables in their struggles while they discover severed hands in an ice vending cart.

The primary cast includes Bala Hasan with Pavithra Janani, Anjali Rao, Vinodhini Vaidyanathan, Poobalam Pragathesh, E. Indrajith and others. It released on ZEE5 on 28 November 2025, and will air in Tamil and Telugu languages.

== Cast ==
- Bala Hasan as Sub-inspector as Vetri
- Pavithra Janani as Constable as Sandhiya
- Anjali Rao as Dhivya
- Vinodhini Vaidyanathan as Doctor Pushpavalli
- Poobalam Pragathesh
- E. Indrajith
- M. Sriram
- C.Thavamani as Sandhiya's uncle

== Production ==
=== Development ===
It is an adaptation of the novel of the same name by Rajesh Kumar. The series is produced by S. Singaravelan under the S.S Group. It is the second collaboration with ZEE5 after Seruppugal Jaakirathai.

=== Casting ===
The series stars Bala Hasan as Sub-inspector Vetri in the lead role in his second collaboration in a limited series after The Game: You Never Play Alone. Actress Pavithra Janani was cast as Constable Sandhiya, marking her return after Bigg Boss 8. This is her first lead role in a limited series.

== Release ==
The first Announcement promo was released on 14 November 2025 featuring the poster showing a name card. The series trailer was released on 19 November 2025 and announced a release date of 28 November. The show premiered in Tamil and Telugu languages on ZEE5.

== Reception ==
Regai received mixed reviews from critics. India Today described the series as an "easy watch for crime drama viewers" and noted that, despite "technical flaws and familiar tropes," the show functions as a straightforward whodunnit.

OTTplay wrote that the series had "potential with its central premise" but found the overall execution "rushed and underwhelming," giving it a rating of 2/5.

Cinema Express called the show "mildly engaging" and remarked that it "does not fully rise above its old-school approach," rating it 2.5/5.

== Episodic details ==
| Episode No. | Title | Synopsis |
|---|---|---|
| 1 | "The Dead End" | SI Vetri looks into the unexplained death of his friend Amudhan, but is initially compelled to treat it as an accident. Later, he and Constable Sandhya notice blood dripping from an ice cream cart, hinting at something more sinister. |
| 2 | "The Fingerprint Revealed" | Vetri and Sandhya discover two severed human hands inside the cart and take them to the government hospital, where they question Dr Pushpavalli. Vetri then realises that Amudhan’s death is tied to this gruesome case. |
| 3 | "The Trap" | Vetri reopens Amudhan’s case and returns to the crime scene, where he uncovers additional fingerprints linked to the cart. He and Sandhya begin meeting the families of other victims as the pattern of the killings emerges. |
| 4 | "Divya's Escape" | Vetri and Sandhya manage to catch Divya, who turns violent during interrogation. While the forensic team unlocks Amudhan’s phone and identifies a fifth victim, Divya injures Sandhya in the hospital and manages to escape. |
| 5 | "The Clinical Crime" | An unconscious Sandhya is moved out of the hospital, while Vetri intercepts Divya as she attempts to murder the mortuary attendant. Divya admits her role in the crimes, but Vetri soon receives a menacing threat call. |
| 6 | "And That's How She Died" | Fearing for her safety, Divya reveals the mastermind behind the illegal drug trials. As Vetri races to rescue Sandhya, he sets up a plan to capture the person responsible for killing Amudhan and the other victims. |
