= Naai Sekar =

2022 Indian film

- Theatrical release poster
- Directed by: Kishore Rajkumar
- Written by: Kishore Rajkumar & Praveen Balu
- Produced by: Kalpathi S. Aghoram; Kalpathi S. Ganesh; Kalpathi S. Suresh
- Starring: Sathish; Pavithra Lakshmi
- Cinematography: Praveen Balu
- Edited by: Ram Pandian
- Music by: Songs: Ajesh; Anirudh Ravichandar; Background Score: Ms Jones Rupert
- Production company: AGS Entertainment
- Release date: 13 January 2022
- Running time: 131 minutes
- Country: India
- Language: Tamil

Naai Sekar (transl. Dog Sekar) is a 2022 Indian Tamil-language science fantasy comedy film directed by debutant Kishore Rajkumar and produced by AGS Entertainment. The film stars Sathish in the titular role, alongside Pavithra Lakshmi (in her film debut), George Maryan, Ganesh, Livingston, Ilavarasu, Sriman, G. Gnanasambandam, Nithya Ravindran and Manobala. It revolves around a man who has his soul swapped with a Labrador Retriever.

The film soundtrack featured three songs with a song composed by Anirudh Ravichander. Naai Sekar was released on 13 January 2022.

== Plot ==
Sekar is an IT employee who does not like his job much. His neighbour Rajarajan is a scientist who is hellbent on proving that it is possible to alter the DNA of humans and animals, thereby making humans have characteristics of animals. While the result of his experiment goes unexpected, one day a dog named Padayappa bites Sekar and that ends up in their characteristics getting swapped. The rest of the movie is about what happens next and how the two get back to their original selves.

== Cast ==
- Sathish as Sekar Lakshmipathi
- Bruno as the dog Padaiyappa
  - Shiva as the voice for Padaiyappa
- Pavithra Lakshmi as Pooja Neelakandan, Sekar's love interest
- George Maryan as Scientist Rajarajan
- Kishore Rajkumar as Prakash
- Shankar–Ganesh as "Thanni Thotti" Sukumar
- Livingston as Police Officer Thangaraj
- Ilavarasu as Pooja's father
- Sriman as Inspector "Krodham" Ravi
- Gnanasambandam as Sekar's father
- Nithya Ravindran as Sekar's mother
- Manobala as Gopi
- Swaminathan as Regional Manager
- Kimu Gopal as Sekar's Team Leader
- Vinodhini Vaidyanathan as Company Director
- Lollu Sabha Maaran as Maali
- KPY Bala as Colour Sattai
- Sunita Gogoi as Pooja's beautician
- Bujji Babu as Doctor
- Lallu as Delivery Boy
- Apollo Ravi as Kidnapping Gang Leader
- Master Hitesh as Sekar's brother
- Rathinam as News reader
- Vaisagh (special appearance in "Edakku Modakku")

== Production ==
=== Development ===
The production company AGS Entertainment announced a new project with Sathish (in his debut lead role) and announced the title as Naai Sekar in September 2021. According to the director Kishore Rajkumar, the film's concept emerged from a scene in the 2011 film Mayakkam Enna, where Dhanush's character is "told to act like a dog" as a form of insult. Pavithra Lakshmi who contested earlier in Cooku with Comali season 2, was cast in the film as the female lead. The voice over for the dog was given by Shiva.

=== Title dispute ===
Actor Vadivelu also planned his next film title as Naai Sekar with director Suraj which was bankrolled by Lyca Productions and the film was a spinoff of his character Naai Sekar in the Thalai Nagaram (2006). But the title was already registered by AGS Entertainment. After a lot of discussions, AGS Entertainment still kept the film as Naai Sekar. So the makers of Vadivelu's film had to go for an alteration in the title and finalised Naai Sekar Returns as their new title.

== Music ==
The soundtrack featured three songs with "Edakku Modakku" song composed and sung by Anirudh Ravichander. The lyric was written by Sivakarthikeyan and choreography was done by Sandy for 'Edakku Modakku' song. The other two songs were composed by Ajesh and the original background score was composed by Ms Jones Rupert.

Track listing
No.	Title	Lyrics	Music	Singer(s)	Length
1.	"Edakku Modakku"	Sivakarthikeyan	Anirudh Ravichander	Anirudh Ravichander	03:12
2.	"Lol Lol Arasan"	Vivek	Ajesh	Baba Sehgal	03:50
3.	"90's Kid"	Kishore Rajkumar	Ajesh	G. V. Prakash Kumar	03:18
Total length:					10:20

== Release and reception ==
Naai Sekar was released on 13 January 2022 on the occasion of Pongal. M. Suganth of The Times of India rated it 3 out of 5 stating "Naai Sekar has a great premise for a fun film, especially a kids-centric one. The brilliance of this idea is its simplicity".
