= IPC 376 =

2021 Indian Tamil movie

- Release poster
- Directed by: Ramkumar Subbaraman
- Produced by: S. Prabhakar
- Starring: Nandita Swetha
- Cinematography: K. Dhillraj
- Edited by: Nirmal
- Music by: Yaadhav Ramalinkgam
- Production company: Power King Studio
- Release date: 29 October 2021
- Country: India
- Language: Tamil

IPC 376 is a 2021 Indian Tamil-language horror thriller film directed by Ramkumar Subbaraman and starring Nandita Swetha.

== Cast ==
- Nandita Swetha as Yazhini (Voice dubbed by Uma Maheswari)
- Meghana Ellen as Bharati
- Mahanadhi Shankar as Perumal
- Marimuthu as Arumugam
- Sampath Ram as Assistant Commissioner
- Saravana Sakthi
- Raja
- Madhusudhan Rao as Swamiji
- Super Subbarayan as Rajasekaran
- Aryan as Sebastian
- Pondy Ravi
- Bijili Ramesh
- Robo Chandru as Murugesan

== Production ==
The film is directed by Ramkumar Subbaraman, a former assistant of Balasekaran and Prabhu Solomon. The film is about the consequences of rape crime. The title IPC 376 is based on the Indian penal code section for rape crime. The film was planned to be made as a Tamil and Telugu language bilingual. Nandita Swetha underwent training for her role as a cop. Nandita did an underwater stunt sequence in the film. She performed the stunt sequences herself without a body double. The final schedule of shooting started in January 2020. Filming finished in March 2020.

== Soundtrack ==
Songs by Yaadhav Ramalinkgam.

- "Angali Thaye"
- "Karaarana Khakki"

== Reception ==
A critic from Maalaimalar praised the performances of the cast while criticising the film's pace.
