= Kutram Thavir =

Indian Tamil-language crime thriller film

- Directed by: Gajendra
- Produced by: P. Pandurangan
- Starring: Rishi Rithvik; Aradhaya; Sai Saindhivi
- Cinematography: Rowin Basker
- Edited by: Ranjith Kumar
- Music by: Srikanth Deva
- Production company: Sree Sai Saindhavi Creations
- Distributed by: Uthraa Productions
- Release date: 26 September 2025
- Country: India
- Language: Tamil

Kutram Thavir (transl. Except for the crime) is a 2025 Indian Tamil-language crime thriller film directed by Gajendra and produced by Pandu Rangan under the banner Sree Sai Saindhavi Creations. The film stars Rishi Rithvik, Aradhaya, and Sai Saindhivi in the lead roles. Distributed by Uthraa Productions, the film was released on 26 September 2025.

== Cast ==
- Rishi Rithvik as Rudra
- Aradhaya as Indhumathi
- Sai Saindhivi as Pooja
- Saravanan as Manivasagam
- Sai Dheena as Manivanan
- M. Kamaraj as Robert
- Sendrayan
- Anand Babu
- Meesai Rajendranath as Inspector Karigalan
- George Vijay as Kumar
- Vinodhini Vaidyanathan as Kasturi
- Ashmitha Singh
- P. Pandurangan
- P. Suresh
- Dayanand (Vicky)
- E. D. Murali
- Sai Krishna
- S. Deepak Darshin

== Production ==
The film was produced by Pandu Rangan under Sree Sai Saindhavi Creations. Cinematography was handled by Rowin Basker, editing by Ranjith Kumar, and music was composed by Srikanth Deva.

== Soundtrack ==
The music was composed by Srikanth Deva. An audio release function was held in April 2025.

== Reception ==
Dinakaran stated that director Gajendra has filmed incidents that we have seen in many films, such as transplant surgeries in hospitals, theft of body parts, politicians colluding with anti-social elements, corruption. Maalai Malar wrote that director Gajendra has directed the film based on the story of a medical crime thriller.
