= Saravana Sakthi =

Indian actor and director

- Other name: Raj Sethupathy
- Occupations: Director; actor
- Years active: 2007–present

Saravana Sakthi is an Indian actor and director who works in Tamil-language films. He has acted in more than twenty-five films.

== Career ==
Saravana Sakthi began his career as an assistant director under R.Aakash before working on the directorial ventures Dhandayuthapani (2007) and Nayagan (2008). He later became an actor and garnered recognition for his role in Kutti Puli (2013), which enables him to feature in several other films. He worked as the screenplay writer for Soorakaathu (2017) in addition to portraying the antagonist. He returned to direction with Billa Pandi (2019).

== Filmography ==
=== As a director and writer ===
Year	Title	Director	Writer	Notes
2007	Dhandayuthapani	Yes	Yes	Also actor
2008	Nayagan	Yes	Yes	
2017	Soorakathu	No	Yes	Also actor
2018	Billa Pandi	Yes	Yes	
2022	Santharpam	Yes	No	
2023	Kulasami	Yes	Yes	Also actor

=== As an actor ===
Films

- Dhandayuthapani (2007)
- Pattaya Kelappu (2008)
- Kutti Puli (2013)
- Marudhu (2016)
- Raja Manthiri (2016)
- Dharmadurai (2016)
- Soorakathu (2017)
- Kodiveeran (2017)
- Torchlight (2018)
- Sandakozhi 2 (2018)
- Kanne Kalaimaane (2019)
- Devarattam (2019)
- Miga Miga Avasaram (2019)
- Adutha Saattai (2019)
- Utraan (2020)
- Walter (2020)
- Cocktail (2020)
- Danny (2020)
- Ka Pae Ranasingam (2020)
- Irandam Kuththu (2020)
- Eeswaran (2021)
- Ganesapuram (2021)
- Appathava Aattaya Pottutanga (2021)
- IPC 376 (2021)
- Raajavamsam (2021)
- Maamanithan (2022)
- Kolathuran (2022)
- Vizhithelu (2023)
- Kulasami (2023)
- Tik Tok (2023)
- Pambattam (2024)
- Uyir Thamizhukku (2024)
- Saamaniyan (2024)
- Nandhan (2024)
- Sir (2024)
- Karuppu Petti (2024)
- Badava (2025)
- Vasool Mannan (2026)
- Kara (2026)
- Pani Vizhum Iravu (2026)

Streaming television

- Exam (2026)
