= Yugi (film) =

2022 murder mystery film

- Promotional poster (Tamil)
- Directed by: Zac Harriss
- Written by: Packiaraj
- Starring: Kathir; Sharaf U Dheen; Narain; Natty; Joju George
- Cinematography: Pushparaj Santhosh
- Edited by: Jomin Mathew
- Music by: Ranjin Raj; Dawn Vincent
- Production company: Juvis Productions
- Release date: 18 November 2022
- Country: India
- Languages: Tamil; Malayalam

Yugi (titled Adrishyam in Malayalam) is a 2022 Indian bilingual mystery thriller film directed by Zac Harris, shot in Tamil and Malayalam simultaneously, stars Kathir, Natty and Narain in the lead roles for the Tamil version, while Sharaf U Dheen and Joju George played the lead roles in the Malayalam version alongside Narain. It was released on 18 November 2022.

Apart from replacing the lead roles, the rest of Adrishyam was dubbed from Yugi.

== Plot ==
Retired DSP Purushothaman (Prathap Pothan), who is hiding in a foreign country after being accused of involvement in a smuggling case, contacts private detective Nandakumar (Narain) and asks him to find his missing illegitimate daughter. He requests Nanda to handle the investigation unofficially because Karthika's status as his illegitimate daughter could cause a scandal. He also assigns officer Rajkumar to assist Nanda. Rajkumar soon meets Nanda, hands him the case file of Purushothaman's daughter Karthika (Anandhi), and they begin the investigation.

During their inquiry, nobody in the neighborhood where Karthika supposedly lived claims to have seen her. The current tenants of her house also deny knowing her, explaining that they rented the property only recently. They provide information about the landlord, who tells Nanda that he rented the house to Karthika several months earlier, after which she disappeared. He also reveals that Karthika was pregnant during her stay and rarely left the house, although a nurse frequently visited her. The landlord never saw her husband but heard that he had been hospitalized following an accident.

Following this lead, Nanda's team makes inquiries at hospitals throughout the city and eventually identifies the hospital where Karthika had been receiving treatment. The hospital staff reveals that Karthika frequently visited a doctor named Chandrika (Vinodhini Vaidyanathan). Nanda and his team visit Chandrika, only to discover that she has just been murdered.

That same night, a famous actor, Guruprasad (John Vijay), is also murdered, prompting Nanda to be summoned to the scene. There, Nanda is shocked to find Purushothaman, who was supposedly hiding abroad. Purushothaman is arrested as the prime suspect. He explains that he returned to India after Rajkumar informed him that his daughter had been found, leaving Nanda confused.

Nanda then goes to Rajkumar's house but discovers that he has apparently moved out. Inside, Nanda finds a man tied up inside a cupboard. After freeing him, the man identifies himself as the real Rajkumar. It is then revealed that Karthika's husband was the man who had been impersonating Rajkumar.

After Karthika's husband was hospitalized following an accident, Karthika visited him but was unable to afford his treatment. Guruprasad, who happened to be at the hospital, witnessed their situation and secretly offered to pay for his treatment. In return, he asked Karthika to become a surrogate mother for him and his wife, as they were unable to conceive a child. Karthika initially refused, but Chandrika persuaded her to accept it. To protect his public reputation, Guruprasad insisted that the surrogacy remain completely confidential, even from Karthika's husband. As a result, Karthika was prevented from seeing her husband until the baby was born.

Karthika's husband eventually recovered consciousness and repeatedly demanded to see her. Fearing that he might cause a scene and expose the surrogacy arrangement, Chandrika had him transferred to a mental asylum and confined there. Meanwhile, Karthika, who had not seen her husband for months, became increasingly worried about his condition without even knowing whether he was still alive. She eventually confronted Chandrika and demanded to see him. Chandrika then took Karthika to Guruprasad's house to resolve the situation.

At Guruprasad's house, Karthika confronted him about her husband. During their argument, a physical struggle broke out, and Guruprasad accidentally killed her. He then used his influence to persuade Purushothaman to help cover up the crime.

Karthika's husband eventually recovered fully and escaped from the mental asylum. He began searching for Karthika and eventually discovered that Purushothaman might know what had happened to her. However, Purushothaman had already gone into hiding. To reach him, Karthika's husband kidnapped Purushothaman's daughter, Pavithra, prompting Purushothaman to contact Rajkumar and Nanda and ask them to find her.

When the real Rajkumar came to investigate Pavithra's disappearance, Karthika's husband kidnapped him as well. He altered the case file, replacing Pavithra's information with Karthika's, and then impersonated Rajkumar. He used the position to assist Nanda while secretly manipulating the investigation into uncovering the truth about his wife's disappearance.

After learning that Chandrika was connected to Karthika, he reached her before Nanda could question her and forced her to confess the truth. Unable to forgive her for her role in Karthika's death, he murdered her. He later killed Guruprasad as well, using Purushothaman's gun to frame him.

When Nanda attempts to arrest Karthika's husband, he produces his mental asylum identification card and warns Nanda that he cannot be easily prosecuted because he is legally considered mentally unstable.

In the final scene, after avenging Karthika's death, Karthika's husband voluntarily returns to the mental asylum, choosing to spend the rest of his life there.

== Cast ==
- Kathir / Sharaf U Dheen as SI Rajkumar (Imposter)
- Narain as Nandakumar
- Natty / Joju George as Sethu
- Athmiya Rajan as Shalini
- Anandhi as Karthika
- Pavithra Lakshmi as Pavithra Mariamma
- Prathap Pothan as Ex DSP R. Purushothaman
- John Vijay as Guruprasad
- Munishkanth as Kokki Kumar
- Vinodhini Vaidyanathan as Dr. Chandrika
- Anjali Rao as Netra
- T. M. Karthik as Barber shop customer
- Namo Narayana
- Pichaikkaran Moorthy
- Vetrivel Raja
- Prankster Rahul
- Zinil Zainuddin
- R. N. R. Manohar as the opposition party leader (uncredited)
- Kothandam as complainant (uncredited; Tamil version only)

== Production ==
In late 2019, director Zac Harriss and writer Packiaraj, sought out to make a Tamil film and pitched the idea to artistes to secure their dates. Upon discussions with Narain, the makers chose to film it as a bilingual with separate actors in Tamil and Malayalam. In Malayalam, the film starred Narain, Joju George and Sharaf U Dheen, while in Tamil, the film starred Narain, Natty and Kathir. The filming was done simultaneously for both the versions.

== Soundtrack ==
Soundtrack was composed by Ranjin Raj.

Tamil

- "Kadavul Thandha" - Pradeep Kumar, Saindhavi
- "Neeradum" - Ranjin Raj
- "Moolaya Saanam" - Sivam

Malayalam

- "Imakal" - KS Harishankar, Nithya Mammen
- "Imakal Chimmathiravum" - Ranjin Raj
- "Chandrakaladharane " - Joju George

== Reception ==
The film was released on 18 November 2022 across Tamil Nadu and Kerala. A critic from Cinema Express wrote the film was "a tedious revenge thriller with one too many twists" and that "the exposition and the unraveling in this film feels so overwhelming that we lose interest halfway". A reviewer from The Times of India noted "Yugi is interesting in bits and pieces, but fails to deliver as a whole". The reviewer added "the technical aspects of the film are quite decent and the background score really helps to elevate certain moments, which would have otherwise been flat". A critic from The Hindu wrote that "Despite its powerful star cast and potential to weave a gripping narrative, the loud treatment, haphazard editing, and horrific lip sync make Adrishyam an underwhelming watch". A reviewer from Manorama Online opined that "Director Zac Harris has done a decent job keeping the mystery intact, though he hasn't been able to infuse much freshness into the plotline".
