= Pavithra Lakshmi =

Indian Actress

- Born: 16 June 1994 (age 32); Coimbatore, Tamil Nadu
- Occupations: Actress, model
- Years active: 2015–present

Pavithra Lakshmi is an Indian actress who has appeared in Tamil and Malayalam language films. After making her debut in the Tamil film O Kadhal Kanmani (2015), she rose to fame through her appearance in the show Cooku with Comali (2021) and has been seen in films including Naai Sekar (2022) and Ullasam (2022).

== Career ==
Pavithra first appeared in a small role in Mani Ratnam's O Kadhal Kanmani (2015), featuring as a colleague of Dulquer Salmaan's lead character. She continued working as a model, notably winning the Miss Madras 2015 and Queen of India 2016 pageants. In 2021, she appeared on the celebrity cooking show Cooku with Comali, with the appearance leading to further acting offers.

Pavithra appeared in four films in 2022, with AGS Entertainment's comedy drama Naai Sekar being her biggest release. Paired opposite Sathish, she won positive reviews for her portrayal, with a critic from The New Indian Express noting "though she doesn't get enough scenes to help us understand the character deeper, Pavithra does what was required of her with ease". She later featured in the coming-of-age Malayalam film Ullasam opposite Shane Nigam, and the bilingual drama Yugi, alongside an ensemble cast.

== Filmography ==
Films

| Year | Film | Role | Language | Notes |
|---|---|---|---|---|
| 2015 | O Kadhal Kanmani | Aditya's co-worker | Tamil | Uncredited role |
| 2021 | R23 Criminal's Diary | | Tamil | |
| 2022 | Naai Sekar | Pooja Neelakandan | Tamil | |
| 2022 | Ullasam | Nima Alex | Malayalam | |
| 2022 | Adrishyam | Pavithra | Malayalam | Bilingual film |
| 2022 | Yugi | Pavithra | Tamil | Bilingual film |
| 2023 | Jigiri Dosthu | Sanju | Tamil | |
| 2024 | Once Upon A Time in Madras | Anitha | Tamil | |

=== Television ===
| Year | Title | Role | Network | Notes |
|---|---|---|---|---|
| 2020 | Time Enna Boss!? | Sandhiya | Amazon Prime | |
| 2021 | Cooku with Comali | Contestant | Star Vijay | 4th Runner-Up |
| 2023 | 11th South Indian International Movie Awards | Host | Sun TV | Co-hosted with Sathish |
