= Marina Puratchi =

2019 Indian film

- Directed by: MS Raj
- Produced by: Pandiraj; Jesu Sundarraman
- Starring: Naveen Kumar; Shruti Reddy
- Cinematography: R. Velraj
- Edited by: Deepak
- Music by: Al Rufian
- Production companies: Pasanga productions J Studios
- Release date: 13 December 2019
- Country: India
- Language: Tamil

Marina Puratchi (transl. Marina Revolution) is a 2019 Indian Tamil language drama film based on the jallikattu protests. The film stars Naveen Kumar and Shruti Reddy and is directed by MS Raj, a former associate to director Pandiraj who also produced the film under his banner Pasanga productions. Al Rufian composed the music for the film while cinematography was handled by R. Velraj. The film has been honoured by the Norway Tamil Film Festival and Federation of Tamil Sangams of North America (FETNA).

== Plot ==
The film begins with Sukanya (Shruti Reddy) and Parthasarathy (Naveen Kumar) attending an interview for the post of a reporter in a private channel. When the interviewer feels that they do not know much about the history of jallikattu and the protests which took place, he gives them two weeks’ time to learn thoroughly about the bull-taming sport. The two aspiring reporters learn about the history and significance of jallikattu protest to secure a job in a private channel. The rest of the film is their presentation about jallikattu to the interview board.

== Cast ==
- Naveen Kumar as Parthasarathy
- Shruti Reddy as Sukanya
- "Put Chutney" Rajmohan

== Production ==
The film is based on the jallikattu protests on the Marina Beach in Chennai as the director, MS Raj, felt that it was an important topic to document. According to Raj, Marina Puratchi is a mixture of documentary and fiction revealing he was inspired by Fahrenheit 9/11. Cinematographer R. Velraj and audiographer Tapas Nayak worked on the film without pay as they felt that the issue being addressed was important. Model-actress Shruti Reddy was selected after MS Raj wanted a debutante for the role. After liking the content of the film, Jesu Sundarraman from the United States agreed to produce the film under his production house, J Studios.

== Reception ==
The Times of India wrote "The kind of research the director did for the film deserves special mention". He has touched upon various factors and anybody who wants to gather basic information about the traditional sport and the protest could watch the film while also criticizing the film by stating how there was hardly interesting except for the detailed information doled out on jallikattu. Maalai Malar praised the cinematography and background music.
