= Baby (2015 Tamil film) =

2015 Indian Tamil film directed by D Suresh

- film poster
- Directed by: D. Suresh
- Produced by: D. Senthil; K. Yogesh
- Starring: Manoj Bharathiraja; Shira Gaarg; Baby Sathanya; Baby Srivarshini; Anjali Rao
- Cinematography: Jones Anand
- Edited by: Bagath Singh
- Music by: Satesh; Hariish
- Production companies: RK Entertainment; Sri Annamalaiyar Studios
- Release date: 3 July 2015 (India)
- Country: India
- Language: Tamil

Baby is a 2015 Indian Tamil-language horror film directed by D Suresh. The story revolves around a separated couple who later reunite to protect their daughter from being haunted. It was released on 3 July 2015.

== Plot ==
Sakthi (Shira Gaarg), after having separated from her husband, lives with her 6 years old daughter Adhithi (Baby Shrivarshini). In her apartment, Adhithi starts hearing a voice calling her name, and is initially afraid. After celebrating her birthday, Adhithi finds a baby doll near her floor lift and again hears that voice which asks her to take the doll as her birthday gift and Adhithi starts developing a likeness towards that voice and start seeing a ghostly figure to which she gets attached soon. On one night, Adhithi draws the ghostly figure in a piece of paper and writes her name as Anne. When Sakthi notices this drawing, she was bit worried and even consults a psychiatrist who in-turn advises her to spend more time with her child.

Sakthi gets mentally disturbed when one of her friend conveys her that Adhithi neither looks like Sakthi nor Siva (Manoj Bharathiraja), her husband. She goes for a DNA test with Adhithi and the test results turn to be negative - their DNA did not match with each other. Upset with this, she directly goes to her husband Siva's apartment and demands to take her biological daughter Avanthika (Baby Sathanya) with her who was living with her father all these years.

After a hot discussion between the two, Siva reveals a flashback as follows: When Avanthika was born, she was taken to ICU unit as she had some respiratory problem. Siva with help of doctor gets another new born baby from another ward and places near Sakthi who was still asleep. He does this to protect Sakthi as she was mentally too weak to hear her own baby is suffering from respiratory problem. Later, when his own baby recovers Siva tells the truth to Sakthi and gives back another baby to doctor. But this another baby seems to be child of Anne (Anjali Rao) who dies of post-delivery fit after she sees her baby was not present when she woke up from delivery pain. Siva on seeing this decides to take this baby also with him and replaces the baby again when Sakthi was sleeping.

After hearing this story, Sakthi accepts both the children as her own child now and couple also gets united and starts living in Sakthi's apartment together. But things gets worse, when Adhithi gets possessive towards Sakthi as she sees Sakthi getting more attached towards Avanthika. Ghostly figure now frightens Avantika whenever possible and makes her to feel insecure with her mother. On one fine day, Siva sees Anne as that ghostly figure and he immediately realizes Anne was haunting Avantika to have her own child Adhithi to be looked after by Sakthi. When he tells this to Sakthi, she didn't believe him and instead she thinks that Siva was planning to separate her own daughter again from her.

To avoid situation getting even worse and to prevent his own daughter from Anne, he moves back to his old apartment after hot argument with Sakthi. Later, in her apartment, Sakthi gets shocked suddenly when she sees Adhithi playing with Anne and takes Adhithi with her, driving away from her apartment. She calls Siva and tells about what she had seen in her apartment. Siva suggests Sakthi to give Adhithi back to an orphanage to keep full stop to these activities by Anne. But Sakthi refuses this idea and drives away from Siva taking Adhithi with her. She also conveys to Siva on phone while driving her car that she has grown more attached towards Adhithi than Avanthika and she prefers to be with Adhithi forever. Anne who was hearing all these burst emotionally out of what she has done to this family.

But as fate could always have, Sakthi's car meets with an accident which kills Adhithi and leaves Sakthi heavily wounded. The end credit of the film shows that Sakthi standing in front of lift with that doll in her hand. Siva consoles her and takes her back to her apartment. Once they left the place, Adhithi peeps out and sees them walking.

== Cast ==
- Manoj Bharathiraja as Siva
- Shira Gaarg as Sakthi (Siva's ex-wife)
- Baby Sathanya as Avanthika (Sakthi's biological daughter)
- Baby Srivarshini as Adhithi (Sakthi's 6-year-old adopted daughter)
- Anjali Rao as Anne (Adhithi's mother, a Ghost)
- Hema Srikanth as Doctor

== Reception ==
The film was released to mixed-to-positive reviews. A critic from Ananda Vikatan wrote that "A film that needs to be watched with some patience" and praised the direction, background score and cinematography while criticsising the songs.

The Times of India wrote that "Still, Suresh has managed to give us a little film that has its moments and which feels genuinely scary and heartwarming. Sometimes, that is all we ask for".
