= Rishi Rithvik =

Indian film actor

- Born: 1984 (age 40–41); India
- Occupation: Actor
- Years active: 2017–present

Rishi Rithvik is an Indian film actor, who has appeared in Tamil-language films.

== Career ==
Ritvik began his career as an athlete and competed professionally between 2001 and 2007, before moving on to work as a computer software engineer. He was later offered the lead acting role in Rathan Linga's directorial debut Attu (2017), where he portrayed a Chennai-based gangster. To prepare for the role, Rishi lost weight and interacted with real-life gangsters from the region. The film opened to positive reviews but took a low-key opening at the Chennai-based office. As a result, a further film planned with Rathan Linga, Ugramm co-starring R. K. Suresh, and Sillaakki Dumma by Maran Kandhaswamy. were also put on hold.

Rishi played a police officer in his second release, Marijuana (2020), before starring in Dola (2021), a film which only starred four actors.

He co-starred Vikram Prabhu in Raid (2023), a remake of the Kannada film Tagaru in which he reprised Dhananjaya's role as Daali. Regarding his performance, national film critic Malini Mannath wrote that "Rishi Rithvik reveals a new dimension to his performance and infuses life in the character". In Thirumbipaar (2024), he featured alongside Vidya Pradeep.

== Filmography ==
Year	Film	Role	Notes
2017	Attu	Attu	
2018	Ezhumin		Uncredited
2020	Marijuana	Guru	
2021	Dola		
2022	Viruman	Sembadiyan	
2023	Dinosaurs	Dhana	
2023	Raid	Daali	
2024	Thirumbipaar		
2025	Padai Thalaivan		
2025	Phoenix		
2025	Madharaasi	Harsha	
2025	Kutram Thavir	Rudra	
2025	Diesel	Dilli Babu	
