= Anjali Rao (actress) =

Indian actress (born 1990)

- Born: Punjab, India
- Occupations: Actress, model
- Years active: 2013–present
- Notable work: AYM Simbu sister

Anjali Rao is an Indian actress who has appeared in Tamil, Telugu and Malayalam language films, ad films, Shortfilms and television serials. After making her debut as a supporting actress, she has been seen in lead roles in films including Vanmam (2014) and Baby (2015).

== Career ==
Anjali Rao was born in Guntur, Andhra Pradesh, India to P B Rao and Sujatha Kumari hailing from Ponnekallu Guntur, Andhra Pradesh . As her father was an army Officer she travelled across the northern part of India and studied in army schools during her childhood. Her father was later transferred to Chennai. She consequently finished her schooling in Kendriya Vidyala Meenambakkam and followed that up with a BBA and MBA at Vels University in Chennai. During her time in college, Anjali Rao became involved in modelling and worked on commercials which gave her an entry into the film industry. Anjali Rao began her career playing supporting roles in films, notably appearing in the Nithya Menen-starrer Malini 22 Palayamkottai (2014), as Vijay Sethupathi's pair in the village drama Vanmam (2014) and as a ghost in the horror film Baby (2015). She later worked with Gautham Vasudev Menon in Achcham Yenbadhu Madamaiyada (2016), featuring as Silambarasan's sister.

Anjali then worked on Priyadarshan's social drama Sometimes (2017) amongst an ensemble cast, and was picked after impressing producer A. L. Vijay with her acting skills during their work together in commercials. She also featured as lead actress in Peechankai and Pothanur Thabal Nilayam .

== Filmography ==
| Year | Film | Role | Language |
|---|---|---|---|
| 2013 | Soodhu Kavvum | Kesavan's colleague | Tamil |
| 2013 | Pizza II: Villa | Aarthi's friend | Tamil |
| 2013 | Kochadaiiyaan | Deepika Padukone Facials | Tamil |
| 2014 | Malini 22 Palayamkottai | Jency | Tamil |
| 2015 | Vanmam | Hema | Tamil |
| 2015 | Baby | Anne | Tamil |
| 2016 | Ghatana | Jency | Telugu |
| 2016 | Achcham Yenbadhu Madamaiyada | Maythrei Muralidharan | Tamil |
| 2016 | Sahasam Swasaga Sagipo | Maythrei Muralidhar | Telugu |
| 2017 | Kanna Pinna | | Tamil |
| 2017 | Peechankai | Abhirami | Tamil |
| 2018 | Sometimes | Sheela | Tamil |
| 2018 | Annanukku Jai | Veni | Tamil |
| 2018 | Sei | Janaki | Tamil |
| 2022 | Pothanur Thabal Nilayam | Mirthula | Tamil |
| 2022 | Yugi | Netra | Tamil |
| 2022 | Adrishyam | Netra | Malayalam |

== Television and webseries ==
| Year | Title | Role | Language | Channel | Notes |
|---|---|---|---|---|---|
| 2016–2017 | Keratalu | Swetha | Telugu | Gemini TV | Best Debut Actress at Gemini Awards |
| 2016 | Sahayathrika | Asha Kurian | Malayalam | Surya TV | |
| 2017–2018 | Mahalakshmi | Anjali | Tamil | Sun TV | |
| 2017–2018 | Thalayanai Pookal | Vethavalli | Tamil | Zee Tamil | Replaced Nisha Krishnan |
| 2017–2018 | Ruthugeetham | Prashanti | Telugu | ETV | |
| 2018 | Alarm | Malini | Tamil; Telugu; Malayalam | Zee 5 | Webseries |
| 2018–2020 | Swathi Nakshatram Chothi | Veda | Malayalam | Zee Keralam | Replaced by Archana Suseelan |
| 2018–2019 | Lakshmi Stores | Raji | Tamil | Sun TV | |
| 2019 | Boeing Boeing | Herself as Contestant | Malayalam | Zee Keralam | Reality Game show episode winner |
| 2019 | Thamara Thumbi | Arundhathi / Vasundhara | Malayalam | Surya TV | |
| 2019 | Vandhaal Mahalakshmi | Anchor | Tamil | Sun Life | Game Show |
| 2020 | Kanmani | Ammu | Tamil | Sun TV | |
| 2021 | Hamsageetham | Tara | Telugu | Gemini TV | Replaced by Susmitha |
| 2021–2023 | Mrs. Hitler | Maya | Malayalam | Zee Keralam | |
| 2021 | Swarna Palace | Swarna | Telugu | Zee Telugu | |
| 2021 | Anantham | Lalitha | Tamil | Zee5 | Webseries |
| 2023 | Anuraga Ganam Pole | Anjali ( Giri's friend) | Malayalam | Zee Keralam | guest appearance |
| 2024–2025 | Ninaithen Vandhai | Manohari | Tamil | Zee Tamil | |
| 2024 | Sundari Season 2 | Sundari | Malayalam | Surya TV | |
| 2025 | Regai | Dhivya | Tamil | Zee5 | Webseries |
