= Bijili Ramesh =

Indian comedian and actor (died 2024)

- Died: 26 August 2024 (aged 46); Chennai, India

Comedy career
- Years active: 2018–2024
- Genre: Comedy

Bijili Ramesh (died 26 August 2024) was an Indian actor, comedian and YouTuber who predominantly featured in comedy roles. He was known for his supporting role in the sports drama film Natpe Thunai (2019).

== Career ==
Bijili initially rose to prominence and limelight after gaining fame through prank videos aired and uploaded in YouTube, which also fetched him film acting opportunities which were awaiting in the pipeline. His humor sense and on-screen antics quickly prompted him to be part of Tamil pop culture and became a meme material for social media influencers. He was eventually roped in by filmmaker Nelson Dilipkumar for his maiden directorial venture Kolamaavu Kokila (2018), where Bijili Ramesh appeared in a special appearance for a promotional song. He made his presence felt with his comedic performances after entering as one of the contestants in television cooking reality show Cooku with Comali, which was aired on Star Vijay. He got his breakthrough role in sports drama film Natpe Thunai (2019), where he played the uncle of Hiphop Tamizha Adhi's character.

== Filmography ==
- Kolamaavu Kokila (2018)
- LKG (2019)
- Natpe Thunai (2019)
- Nenjamundu Nermaiyundu Odu Raja (2019)
- A1 (2019)
- Aadai (2019)
- Sivappu Manjal Pachai (2019)
- Comali (2019)
- Zombie (2019)
- Marijuana (2020)
- Ponmagal Vandhal (2020)
- IPC 376 (2021)
- MGR Magan (2021)
- Kaathuvaakula Rendu Kaadhal (2022)
- Vasco Da Gama (2024)

== Death ==
He died on 26 August 2024 at the age of 46, after suffering a long-term illness related to liver failure and endured a prolonged illness. According to his immediate family members, he suddenly died while sleeping. It was reported that two days prior to his untimely death, he returned to his house from hospital after an initial speedy recovery in order to celebrate his wedding anniversary. However, his health conditioned deteriorated and worsened again and had his last breath while sleeping on 26 August 2024. He was deemed to be an alcoholic person as per his close social circles and his death was also associated with his addiction to alcohol leading to an excessive intake of alcoholic consumption. His funeral was held on 27 August 2024 in MGR Nagar, Chennai.
