= Walter (2020 film) =

2020 Indian Tamil-language action crime thriller film

- Theatrical release poster
- Directed by: U. Anbarasan
- Written by: U. Anbarasan
- Produced by: Shruthi Thilak
- Starring: Sibi Sathyaraj; Natty; Samuthirakani; Shirin Kanchwala
- Narrated by: Sathyaraj
- Cinematography: Rasamadhi
- Edited by: Elayaraja
- Music by: Dharmaprakash
- Production company: 11:11 Productions (P) Ltd
- Release date: 13 March 2020
- Running time: 133 minutes
- Country: India
- Language: Tamil

Walter is a 2020 Indian Tamil-language crime thriller film written and directed by U. Anbarasan and produced by Shruthi Thilak. The film stars Sibi Sathyaraj, Natty, Samuthirakani, Riythvika, Sanam Shetty, Munishkanth and Shirin Kanchwala. The principal photography of the film commenced in June 2019, and the film was released on 13 March 2020.

== Plot ==
DSP Walter IPS, the titular character, gets the mandatory yet routine hero introduction scene when a protest turns violent in Kumbakonam. Later, he takes up the case of a couple who seeks his help to find their newborn baby. Walter suspects foul play when he comes across similar cases, and sets out to investigate the crimes, accompanied by his subordinate Paneerselvam. Meanwhile, the ego clash between Eshwaramoorthi, a leading politician in the town, and Bala, who is considered to be his successor, intensifies. Their ego clash brings Balu's friend Arjun, who is linked to the children who have gone missing, into the picture. How Walter faces several obstacles in his attempt to stop a criminal syndicate forms the rest of the story.

== Cast ==
- Sibi Sathyaraj as DSP Walter IPS
- Natty as Arjun Sampath
- Samuthirakani as Bala
- Shirin Kanchwala as Raji
- Charle as Paneerselvam
- Bava Chelladurai as Eshwaramoorthi
- Munishkanth as a journalist
- Riythvika as Padmavathi
- Anil Murali as a Superintendent of Police
- Sanam Shetty as Narmadha Pramod (Cameo appearance)
- Abhishek Vinod as Venkat
- TSR Srinivasan as a doctor
- Saravana Sakthi
- Yamini Sundar
- Sathyaraj as narrator

== Production ==
In September 2018, it was announced that U. Anbarasan would make his directorial debut through a police film titled Walter and had cast Vikram Prabhu, Arjun and Jackie Shroff in the lead roles. Produced by Madukkur Movie Makers, the movie was set to have music composed by Radhan. However, the project was later shelved.

The film restarted in 2019 with new producers, and Sibi Sathyaraj was cast in the lead role, with Gautham Vasudev Menon and Samuthirakani also part of the cast. Menon later backed out and was replaced by Natty Subramaniam. The shooting of the film started from June 2019 in and around Kumbakonam and Thanjavur. Rasamathi, Elaiyaraja, Dharma Prakash, and Vicky were signed up as cinematographer, editor, music director, and stunt master, respectively.

== Soundtrack ==
No.	Title	Singer(s)	Length (m:ss)
1	"Kannil Vazhiyum Endhan"	Naresh Iyer	04:49
2	"Mooche Analena Aach"	D. Sathyaprakash, Vandana Srinivasan	05:22
3	"Pathos Song"	Chinmayi	03:42
4	"Varlaam Vaa"	Mano	04:45
5	"Walter - Background Music"	Dharma Prakash	01:12
6	"Yaarai Thedi Nenjamae"	K. S. Chithra	05:10

== Release ==
The satellite rights were sold to Sun TV and digital rights was secured by Sun NXT.
