= Vinodhini Vaidyanathan =

Indian actress

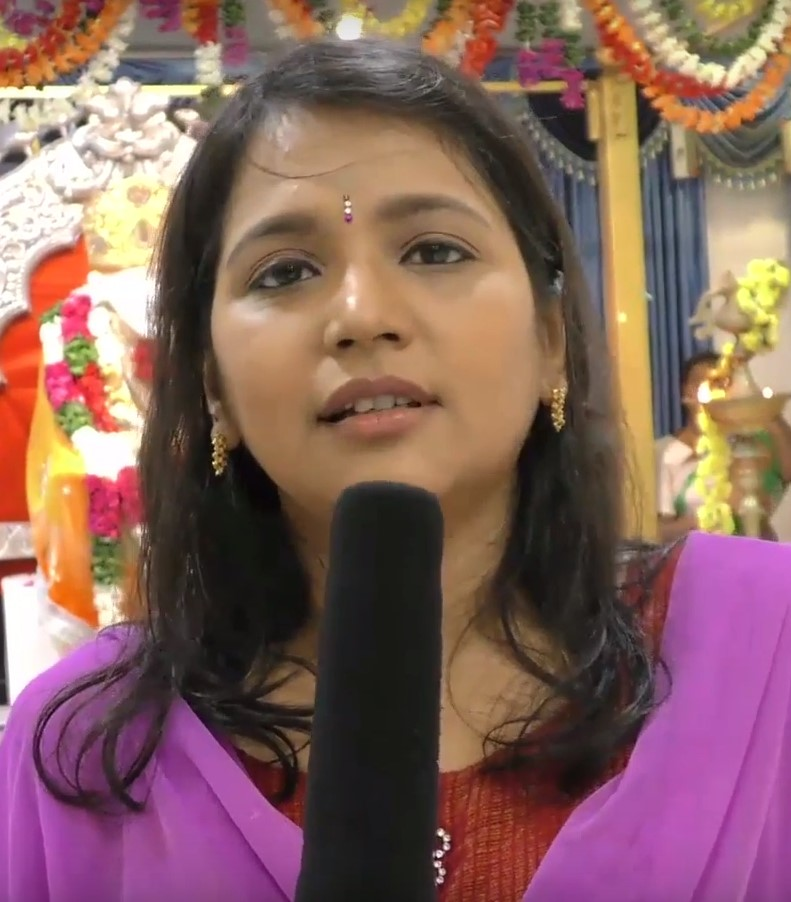
- Vinodhini Vaidyanathan in 2019
- Born: 2 November 1978; Chennai, Tamil Nadu, India
- Other name: Vinodhini
- Occupations: Actress, writer
- Years active: 2011 - present (Films); 2003 - present (Theatre)
- Parent(s): Vaidyanathan & Chandralekha

Vinodhini Vaidyanathan is an Indian actress and writer who has mainly worked in Tamil cinema and theatre. She made her debut in A. R. Murugadoss's Engaeyum Eppothum portraying Ananya's sister. She is best known for her performances in OK Kanmani (2015), Appa (2016), Aandavan Kattalai (2016), Ratsasan (2018), Comali (2019), Game Over (2019), Ponmagal Vandhal (2020) and Soorarai Pottru (2020), Ponniyin Selvan: I (2022) and Ponniyin Selvan: II (2023).

== Career ==
Vinodhini made her first film appearance in Priyadarshan's Kanchivaram (2009), after being selected by the director to be a part of the film after he watched her during a performance with the Tamil theatre troupe, Koothu-P-Pattarai. The film won critical acclaim and recognition at the National Film Awards. In early 2010, director Saravanan had watched Vinodhini's solo performance titled Saami Aattam, in which Vinodhini played multiple characters in a 45-minute monologue, and was impressed enough to cast her in his first Tamil film, Engeyum Eppodhum (2011), produced by AR Murugadoss. Her performance in the film as the character of Ananya's sister, was well received.

Since 2011, Vinodhini has appeared in several other films including the comedy Varuthapadatha Valibar Sangam (2013), the horror film Pisaasu (2014) and two collaborations with Mani Ratnam in Kadal (2013) and O Kadhal Kanmani (2015). She also played a significant supporting role as the wife of a gangster in Karthik Subbaraj's Jigarthanda (2014) and in a leading role in Balu Mahendra's Thalaimuraigal (2013), where she played his daughter.

By 2016, Vinodhini started to be recognized for her performances, going on to win Best Performance in a Comedy Role (Female) 2016 at the Ananda Vikatan Cinema Awards for her role in Aandavan Kattalai, as a junior lawyer.

She has also appeared in a few Telugu-language films. Regarding her performance in Crazy Fellow (2022), a critic called her "a revelation".

Vinodhini is also a playwright and theatre director. Her theatre group, Theatre Zero has been actively staging plays since 2012, some of which are Petti Kathaigal, the musical extravaganza "Aayirathoru Iravugal", which she wrote and directed for the prestigious Hindu Theatre Fest in 2016, and Nagercoil Expressum Nadaga Companyum, which toured extensively in 2016–17. Her play, titled Grand Rehearsal, was the first ever Tamil play to be staged at The Hindu Theatre Fest, which is primarily a festival for English plays from India and abroad. It was declared a laugh riot amid standing ovation from the audience. Similarly, her play Aayirathoru Iravugal, "had the audience roaring with laughter", when it opened in 2016. As of January 2020, Theatre Zero has partnered with stand-up comic Alexander Babu to bring back Vinodhini's play Nagercoil Expressum Nadaga Companyum in its new version and tour with it worldwide.

Vinodhini also writes professionally. Her short stories and articles have been published in Silverscreen.in, The Madras Mag, The News Minute, The Hindu (Tamil) among others.

== Personal life ==
Vinodhini completed her B.Sc. from Ethiraj College for Women, Chennai and went on to do her master's degree in Human Resources Management from XIME, Bangalore. She also holds a second master's degree in Psychology from University of Madras.

== Filmography ==
=== Tamil films ===
List of Vinodhini Vaidyanathan Tamil film credits
Year	Title	Role	Notes
2009	Kanchivaram	Subhatra	
2011	Engaeyum Eppothum	Selvi	
2013	Yamuna	Chandrika	
2013	Kadal	Fisher woman	
2013	Varuthapadatha Valibar Sangam	Police Inspector	
2013	Thalaimuraigal	Sivaraman's sister	
2014	Jigarthanda	Soundar's wife	
2014	Vanmam	Palraj's wife	
2014	Pisaasu	Mahesh's mother	
2015	Nannbenda	Ramya's colleague	
2015	O Kadhal Kanmani	Saroja Vasudevan	
2015	Sivappu	Malar	
2015	Om Shanti Om	Kumar's mother	
2015	Pasanga 2	Sailaja	
2016	Azhagu Kutti Chellam	Anandhi	
2016	Aranmanai 2	Sandhya	
2016	Appa	Singaperumal's wife	
2016	Aandavan Kattalai	Junior Lawyer	Won, Ananda Vikatan Cinema Award for Best Comedian – Female
2017	Aramm	Government Health Officer	
2017	Sathya	Hema	
2017	Velaikkaran	Sivaranjani	
2018	Thaanaa Serndha Koottam	Mangaiyarkarasi	
2018	Kaathadi	Anitha's mother	
2018	Echcharikkai	Doctor	
2018	Ratsasan	Kokila	
2019	LKG	School Principal	
2019	Boomerang	Doctor	
2019	Devarattam	Pechi	
2019	Game Over	Kalamma	
2019	Kalavani 2	Manimekalai Rajendran	
2019	Comali	Bhanu	
2020	Ponmagal Vandhal	Venba's neighbour	
2020	Soorarai Pottru	Chitra Ramaswamy	
2020	Naanga Romba Busy	Dr. Shantha	
2020	Paava Kadhaigal	Sathaar's and Sahira's mother	Netflix anthology series; segment Thangam
2021	Eeswaran	Papathi	
2021	Calls	Deputy Director Shailaja	
2021	MGR Magan	Judge	
2021	Operation Jujupi		
2022	Naai Sekar	Company Director	
2022	Kaatteri	Chithra	
2022	Trigger	Prabhakaran's sister-in-law	
2022	Ponniyin Selvan: I	Vasuki	
2022	Super Senior Heroes	Reporter	Also writer
2022	Parole	Gifty Maria	
2022	Yugi	Dr. Chandrika	
2022	Laththi	Ranganathan's wife	
2023	Vizhithelu		
2023	Ponniyin Selvan: II	Vasuki	
2023	Kulasami	Vasuki	
2023	Baba Black Sheep	Councillor	
2023	Let's Get Married	Deepa Akka	
2023	Are You Ok Baby?	Suguna	
2023	Sooragan	Chithirai Selvi	
2023	Kuiko	Pushpa	
2023	Sarakku		
2023	Tik Tok	Susan	
2024	Local Sarakku	Vinodha	
2024	Saamaniyan	Gayathri	
2024	PT Sir	Nandhini's mother	
2024	Weapon	Mother	
2025	Kadhalikka Neramillai	Jalaja	
2025	Dragon	Chitra Dhanapal	Dubbed for Indumathy Manikandan
2025	2K Love Story		
2025	Dinasari	Gayathri	
2025	Badava	Collector	
2025	Konjam Kadhal Konjam Modhal	Karthik's sister	
2025	Jinn - The Pet		
2025	Thalaivan Thalaivii	Judge	
2025	House Mates	Vijayalakshmi "Viji"	
2025	Madharaasi	Raghu's aunt	
2025	Right		
2025	Kutram Thavir	Kasturi	
2025	Dude	Dr. Nandini	
2025	Yellow		
2026	L.S.S: Love Subscribe Share		
2026	Breakfast	Judge	
2026	Double Occupancy	Rajini's mother	
2026	Nooru Saami	Vandhana's mother	
2026	Arulvaan		
2026	All Pass		

=== Telugu films ===
List of Vinodhini Vaidyanathan Telugu film credits
Year	Film	Role
2019	Game Over	Kalamma
2019	Rakshasudu	Padma
2022	Khiladi	Mahalakshmi
2022	Crazy Fellow	Abhiram's sister-in-law
2023	My Name Is Shruthi	Shruthi's mother

=== Malayalam films ===
List of Vinodhini Vaidyanathan Malayalam film credits
Year	Film	Role
2022	Adrishyam	Dr. Chandrika
2023	Thaaram Theertha Koodaram	Selvi

=== Television ===
- All television shows are in Tamil, unless otherwise noted.

List of Vinodhini Vaidyanathan television credits
Year	Title	Role	Channel	Notes
2003	Appa		Sun TV	
2005-2006	Selvi	Malar	Sun TV	
2020	Chithi 2	Herself	Sun TV	Guest appearance
2022; 2023	Anandha Ragam	Meenakshi	Sun TV	Extended Guest appearance
2022	Amudhavum Annalakshmiyum	Herself	Zee Tamil	Guest appearance
2023	Nala Damayanthi	Annapurani	Zee Tamil	Photographic Appearance
2024	Thangamagal	Vaishali	Star Vijay	
2024	Naanga Ready Neenga Ready Ah	Judge	Sun TV	Reality Game show
2025	Chinnanchiru Kiliye	Judge	Zee Tamil	Guest appearance
2025	Regai	Doctor Pushpavalli	Zee Tamil	
2026-Present	Bhairavi	Shanti	Sun TV	

=== Streaming television series ===
Year	Title	Role	Network	Ref.
2022	Tamil Rockerz	Baanu	SonyLIV	
2023	Accidental Farmer and Co	Nallamakka	SonyLIV	

=== Short Film ===
Year	Film	Role	Notes
2012	1 mark	Devika	
