= Middle Class (film) =

2025 Tamil film

- Theatrical release poster
- Directed by: Kishore Muthuramalingam
- Produced by: G. Dillibabu; Dev; KV Durai
- Starring: Munishkanth; Vijayalakshmi Ahathian; Kaali Venkat
- Cinematography: Sudarshan Srinivasan
- Edited by: San Lokesh
- Music by: Pranav Muniraj
- Production companies: Axess Film Factory; Good Show
- Release date: 21 November 2025
- Running time: 123 minutes
- Country: India
- Language: Tamil

Middle Class is an Indian Tamil-language comedy drama film directed by debutant Kishore Muthuramalingam starring Munishkanth and Vijayalakshmi Ahathian in the lead roles. The film is produced by G. Dillibabu, Dev and KV Durai under the banners of Axess Film Factory and Good Show, respectively.

Middle Class was released in theatres on 21 November 2025 to positive reviews.

== Cast ==
- Munishkanth as Karl Marx
- Vijayalakshmi Ahathian as Anbarasi
- Kuraishi as Auto Driver Daas
- Kodangi Vadivelu as Sengutuvan
- Radha Ravi as Detective
- Vela Ramamoorthy as Sivapunniyam
- Malavika Avinash as Dr. Malathy
- Kaali Venkat as Maara

== Plot ==
Karl Max is a father of a middle class family who works as a water filter repairman. Like many middle-class families, finances are a concern and looks for ways to earn additional income.

While cleaning out his house, Karl finds a legal document belonging to his father in which he realizes he has been bequeathed a large sum sum of money owing to his dad having made a deal with his business subordinate years ago before moving back to his village to help the downtrodden. Karl and Anbarasi decide to meet the business partner to see if they can receive some money.

Karl meets a Gujarati businessman who recognizes who Karl is, and owing to his loyalty to Karl's father writes a cheque for a lump sum of money. But, Karl loses it during his commute to cash it at the bank causing him to scramble everywhere to find it. Anbarasi has made plans with the money and is highly disappointed with Karl's negligence. Karl tries to get the Gujarati businessman to write a cheque one more time, but finds that he has become critically ill following a heart attack and eventually passes away. The business man's son chases Karl away thinking he is a scammer.

Through a series of twists and turns, and with the help of a detective and a hypnotist, Carl eventually recovers the cheque. The businessman's son also realizes who Karl is when his mother explains about Karl's father. The story ends on a happy note with Karl's wife reconciling with him and Karl moving back to his village where his father spent most of his life.

== Production ==
The film was announced in early-November 2020 starring Munishkanth in the lead role, directed by Kishore Muthuramalingam in his debut. Earlier the film was set to be produced by KJR Studios in association with Koustubh Entertainment, but was later announced that the film will be produced by G. Dillibabu, Dev and K. V. Durai under the banners of Axess Film Factory and Good Show, respectively. Principal photography was planned to begin by Diwali 2020, but began on 23 June 2022, with Vijayalakshmi Ahathian playing the female lead. Filming was planned to complete in a single schedule in Chennai and Thanjavur. The film also features Kaali Venkat, Radha Ravi, Malavika Avinash, Vela Ramamoorthy, Vadivel Murugan and Kuraishi in supporting roles. The film has cinematography handled by Sudarshan Srinivasan, editing by San Lokesh and music by Pranav Muniraj.

== Music ==
The single titled "Thaenkoodey" was released on 15 November 2025.

Track listing
No.	Title	Lyrics	Singer(s)	Length
1.	"Thaenkoodey"	Surya Bharathi A. A.	Sean Roldan, Sublahshini

== Release ==
Middle Class was released in theatres on 21 November 2025.

== Reception ==
Dinamalar rated the film with 3.25/5 stars. Abhinav Subramanian of The Times of India gave 2.5/5 stars and wrote "It remains watchable when it could've been unbearable. The relatability might connect with audiences who recognize their own struggles reflected back." Akshay Kumar of Cinema Express gave 1.5/5 stars and wrote "The film is a cruel joke on the villagers, as it proclaims rustic life a silver bullet solution to every trouble faced in the city."
