= Anbe Diana =

2026 Indian Tamil-language romantic comedy drama film

- Theatrical release poster
- Directed by: Pari Elavazhagan
- Written by: Pari Elavazhagan
- Produced by: Sathya Karikalan; Era Saravanan; Yuvaraj Ganesan
- Starring: Pari Elavazhagan; Ramya Ranganathan
- Cinematography: Shelley Calist
- Edited by: Partha MA
- Music by: Bharath Sankar
- Production companies: Million Dollar Studios; Neo Castle Creations; Era Entertainments
- Release date: 17 July 2026
- Running time: 150 minutes
- Country: India
- Language: Tamil

Anbe Diana (transl. Dear Diana) is a 2026 Indian Tamil-language romantic comedy drama film written and directed by Pari Elavazhagan. Produced by Million Dollar Studios, Neo Castle Creations, and Era Entertainments, the film stars Pari Elavazhagan and Ramya Ranganathan. It was released on 17 July 2026.

== Cast ==
- Pari Elavazhagan as Chirumamilla Seetha Krishna
- Ramya Ranganathan as Magic Diana D'Souza
- Chetan as Chirumamilla Adinarayana Bhaskar
- Roja as Sarala
- Parithabangal Gopi as Bangalore Baba
- Cell Murugan as Mangababu
- Nikhila Sankar as Thanisha
- Ismath Banu as Sathyavathi
- Sudharshan Gandhy as Chirumamilla Chiranjeevi Shankar

== Production ==
The film was written and directed by Pari Elavazhagan, who earlier directed Jama (2024). It was produced by Sathya Karikalan, Era Saravanan, and Yuvaraj Ganesan under the banners Million Dollar Studios, Neo Castle Creations, and Era Entertainments. Cinematography was handled by Shelley Calist and editing by Partha Ma.

== Music ==
The music was composed by Bharath Sankar. The first single "Perambur Gaana" was released in late March 2026.

== Release and reception ==
Anbe Diana was released theatrically on 17 July 2026. Sruthi Ganapati Raman of The Hollywood Reporter India described it as a "deeply unserious" and frivolous romance that stays watchable and engaging by focusing on light hearted, harmless fun rather than a rich nuanced depiction of its central cultural and social themes. The film was also reviewed by Cinema Express and The Times of India.
