= Chennaiyil Oru Naal 2 =

2017 Indian film by JPR

- Theatrical release poster
- Directed by: JPR
- Screenplay by: JPR
- Story by: Rajesh Kumar
- Produced by: P.K. Ram Mohan
- Starring: Sarath Kumar; Napoleon; Suhasini; Ramdoss
- Cinematography: Vijay Deepak
- Edited by: Gopi Krishna
- Music by: Jakes Bejoy
- Production company: Kalpataru Pictures
- Release date: 18 October 2017
- Running time: 101 minutes
- Country: India
- Language: Tamil

Chennaiyil Oru Naal 2 (transl. A day in Chennai 2) is a 2017 Indian Tamil-language thriller film written by Rajesh Kumar and directed by JPR. Despite its title, the film is a spiritual successor to the 2013 film Chennaiyil Oru Naal, although Sarath Kumar reprises his role, while Napoleon, Suhasini, and Ramdoss play other supporting roles. The music was composed by Jakes Bejoy with cinematography by Vijay Deepak and editing by Gopi Krishna. The film released on 18 October 2017.

== Synopsis ==
The story revolves around two bad guys who struggle with forces of good and evil while exploring the psychological secret that people tend to bury deep within their minds. The film reveals dark secrets, which manifest into a series of attacks that seek to destroy

== Cast ==
- R. Sarathkumar as Sundarapandian IPS
- Napoleon as Prabakaran IPS
- Suhasini as Sister Lily
- Ramdoss as Ranjith
- Rajasimman as Kumar
- Unnikrishnan as Unni
- Anjana Prem as Sandhya
- Baby Sathanya as Smitha
- Dinesh Karuna as George
- Ajay as Sachin
- Kaushik as Tarun
- Anju as Swapna
- Maria as Nisha
- Ranjith as Sub-Inspector
- Krishnan as Nasser

== Production ==
The film is adapted from a novel written by crime writer Rajesh Kumar. Jakes Bejoy composed the music and Deepak was the cinematographer. Principal photography took 28 days. The film honored special guests (called a pooja) on the 17th of April 2017 in Coimbatore.

== Critical reception ==
Times of India wrote "Chennaiyil Oru Naal 2 is inspired from a novel by crime novelist Rajesh Kumar, and the pulpy elements of its source are all too evident in the film's plot. [..] But the writing never manages to bring all these elements into a satisfactory narrative. The dialogue is stilted and the characters are just functional with no real presence. The investigation part is also amateurish, with Pandian hardly shown as someone who is making actual deductions. The direction is also off, with the actors (including the veterans — Sarath Kumar, Suhasini and Napoleon) performing in an artificial manner, moving and talking slower than people do in real life." The Hindu wrote "Despite being a short film, it feels stretched, underwritten and sometimes meandering all over the place." Cinema Express wrote "Chennaiyil Oru Naal 2 is a crime thriller with enough sub-plots to make a few more films. It's a case of too much in too little time. As if this weren't enough, the climax reveals another sub-plot which is explained to be the reason for all the crimes. The film never seems in any real hurry too, and feels as slow as its lead character when in the slo-mo running sequences. [..] The story, an adaptation of a crime novel, could have been intriguing, had its essence not got lost in translation."
