= Shirin Kanchwala =

Indian model and actress

- Born: Mumbai, Maharashtra, India
- Occupations: Model; actress
- Years active: 2018–present

Shirin Kanchwala is an Indian model and actress who primarily works in Tamil films. She is best known for Tamil movie Nenjamundu Nermaiyundu Odu Raja produced by actor Sivakarthikeyan.

== Early life ==
Shirin Kanchwala was born in Mumbai, Maharashtra, India. She worked as an Air Hostess with Jet Airways for 3 years.

== Career ==
After gaining an interest in modelling and acting, Kanchwala quit Jet Airways and focused on modelling and acting. She played the lead role in her debut Kannada movie Viraaj in 2018. In 2019, she made her debut in Tamil film industry with Nenjamundu Nermaiyundu Odu Raja with Rio Raj. She starred in the Tamil movie Walter alongside Sibiraj and Santhanam's film Dikkiloona.

== Filmography ==
Key
†	Denotes film or TV productions that have not yet been released

Year	Title	Role	Language	Notes
2018	Viraaj	Nandini	Kannada	Kannada debut
2019	Nenjamundu Nermaiyundu Odu Raja	Nisha	Tamil	Tamil debut
2020	Walter	Raji	Tamil	
2021	Dikkiloona	Meghna	Tamil	Released on Zee5
2025	Mr Zoo Keeper	Deepika	Tamil	
