= Baba Black Sheep (2023 film) =

- Release poster
- Directed by: Rajmohan Arumugam
- Written by: Rajmohan Arumugam
- Produced by: Rahul
- Starring: RJ Vigneshkanth; Ammu Abhirami; Abdul Ayaz; Narendra Prasad
- Cinematography: Sudarshan Srinivasan
- Edited by: Vijay Velukutty
- Music by: Santhosh Dhayanidhi
- Production company: Romeo Pictures
- Release date: 14 July 2023
- Country: India
- Language: Tamil

Baba Black Sheep is a 2023 Indian Tamil-language drama film written and directed by Rajmohan Arumugam. The film stars RJ Vigneshkanth, Ammu Abhirami, Abdul Ayaz, and Narendra Prasad. The film was produced by Raahul under the banner of Romeo Pictures. The film was released on 14 July 2023 in theatres.

== Plot ==
A principal runs a school with a wall separating the Boys' school from the coed school. The Boys' school hosts a gang with Ayaz as the head. The Girls' School has NP as the gang leader. The Principal dies suddenly, and the staff is unable to handle both schools. Instead, they combined the two. Eventually, a girl named Nila and Ayaz start to love each other. A fight breaks out between the gangs. Ayaz is given a TC and NP and his group come and save him, leading to the groups to unite. Nila, Ayaz, and NP find a suicidal letter. Whose is it?

== Cast ==
- Abdul Ayaz as Ayaz
- Narendra Prasath NP as Narendra Prasath (NP)
- RJ Vigneshkanth as Vignesh
- Ammu Abhirami as Nila
- Settai Sheriff as Sheriff
- Adhirchi Arun as Arun
- Pragatheeswaran as Pragadheesh (scientist)
- Harshath Khan as Harshath
- Kutty Moonji Vivek as Vivek
- Ram Nishanth as Nishanth
- Abhirami as Eshwari
- Bose Venkat as PT Sir and Arun's father
- Subbu Panchu as Correspondent
- O. A. K. Sundar as NP's father
- Lollu Sabha Udhaya as Pragadheesh's father
- Vinodhini Vaidyanathan as Councillor
- Suresh Chakravarthy as Nagarajan
- Rajmohan as a teacher
- KPY Pazhani as a teacher
- Madurai Muthu as a teacher
- Gundu Kalyanam
- G. P. Muthu as himself (cameo appearance)

== Production ==
The principal photography of the film started on 12 December 2022.

== Reception ==
Logesh Balachandran of The Times of India gave 2. 5 stars out of 5 and stated that "Baba Black Sheep is a one-time watch, especially for 2K kids and those who want to revisit their school days."

Navein Darshan of Cinema Express wrote that "In the opening credits of the film, Rajmohan mentions in a voiceover that the 2k kids brand everything as 'cringe' these days and it is hard to win over them. I thought with such self-awareness, things couldn't possibly go wrong, especially when it is made for the very own 2k kids, but alas!" and gave 2 stars out of 5. Ananda Vikatan critic gave a mixed review.
