= RJ Vigneshkanth =

Indian radio jockey (born 1989)

Vigneshkanth
- Born: Vigneshkanth
- Other name: Vicky
- Occupations: Radio Jockey; Actor; YouTuber; Lyricist
- Years active: 2011–present
- Spouse: Rajathi (m. 2022)

RJ Vigneshkanth is an Indian actor, comedian and former radio jockey. He started his career as a radio jockey in Aaha FM during his final year of college. He formed the Smile Settai and Blacksheep YouTube channels along with Chutti Aravind and Sam Prabha. He is the managing director of Blacksheep.

== Television ==
Year	Program	Role	Channel	Notes
2017	Zee Dance League	Cameo	Zee Tamil	
2017	Nanben Da	Host	Zee Tamil	
2017	As I'm Suffering From Kadhal	Photographer	Hotstar	Cameo appearance
2018	Savaale Samali	Host	Sun TV	
2018–2019	Comedy Khiladis	Host	Zee Tamil	
2020	Thiruvalluar Consultancy Services	Actor	Black Sheep	
2020	Abhiyum Naanum	Harrish	Sun TV	Cameo appearance
2020	Aayiram Jannal Veedu	Actor	Black Sheep	
2021	Chumma Kizhi	Host	Sun TV	
2021	LOL: Enga Siri Paapom	Contestant	Amazon Prime	

== Filmography ==
=== As actor ===
Year	Film	Role	Notes
2016	Chennai 600028 II	Cricket commentator	Cameo appearance
2017	Meesaya Murukku	Jeeva	
2019	Dev	Vicky	Also narrator
2019	Natpe Thunai	Prabhakaran's friend	
2019	Mehandi Circus	Jeeva's friend	
2019	Nenjamundu Nermaiyundu Odu Raja	Vicky	
2019	Kalavani 2	Vicky	
2019	Igloo	Kumar	
2022	Aattral	Saravana	
2022	Kaalangalil Aval Vasantham	Ekalaivan	
2022	Kalaga Thalaivan	Velmurugan	
2023	Takkar	RJ Laddu	
2023	Kathar Basha Endra Muthuramalingam	Paganeri Karuppu	
2023	Baba Black Sheep	Vignesh	
2024	PT Sir	Advocate	Uncredited role
2025	Baby and Baby	Shiva's friend	
2025	Niram Marum Ulagil	Bala	
2025	Aan Paavam Pollathathu	Narayanan	

==== Web series ====
Year	Title	Role	Network
2022	Victim	Jagan	SonyLIV

=== As lyricist ===
Year	Title	Song	Composer	Notes
2016	Vai Raja Mai	"Vai Raja Mai"	Lak	Single
2019	Nenjamundu Nermaiyundu Odu Raja	"Internet Pasanga"	Shabeer	
2020	Thiruvalluvar Consultancy Services	"90's Kids Anthem"	Manikandan Murali	Web series
