= Rockstar Ramani Ammal =

Indian folk singer (1954–2023)

- Also known as: Rockstar
- Born: 1954; Madras State, India
- Died: 4 April 2023 (aged 69) West Mambalam, Chennai, Tamil Nadu, India
- Genres: Playback singing, devotional songs
- Occupations: Singer
- Years active: 2004–2023

Ramani Ammal (Tamil: ரமணியம்மாள்; 1954 – 4 April 2023), also popularly known by her stage name Rockstar Ramani Ammal, was an Indian folk and playback singer. She rose to prominence after taking part in a television reality show Zee Tamil's Sa Re Ga Ma Pa Seniors in 2017. She received the nickname "Rockstar" from the judges of the inaugural edition of the Sa Re Ga Ma Pa Seniors. She made her film debut as a playback singer in Kaadhal (2004).

== Biography ==
Ramani Ammal was born in a middle-class family and had to sacrifice her studies due to the family background. Inspired by veteran actor turned politician M. G. Ramachandran, she pursued her interest in music at a young age but became a house maid to earn an income. She had also sung at weddings to keep her interest in music alive. She worked as a house servant during most of her career before gaining her first opportunity to sing in a film. She made her debut as a singer in the 2004 romantic drama film Kaadhal. She also sang in Kathavarayan (2008), Thenavattu (2008), and Haridas (2013). However, she didn't receive many film opportunities and returned to house work.

In 2017, she made her television debut at the age of 63 on the reality TV show Sa Re Ga Ma Pa Seniors and subsequently became a household name, known for singing film songs. She was one of the top ten finalists of the show and also emerged as the first runner-up in the grand finale in April 2018. Following her success with Sa Re Ga Ma Pa, she received several film opportunities as a playback singer and sang songs for Junga (2018), Sandakozhi 2 (2018), Kaappaan (2019), and Nenjamundu Nermaiyundu Odu Raja (2019). She also performed in concerts in Sri Lanka, Singapore, and United States.

In 2018, she also made a special appearance in one episode of the television soap opera Yaaradi Nee Mohini.

=== Death ===
Ammal died on 4 April 2023, at age 69.

== Discography ==
Year	Film	Song(s)	Notes
2008	Kaathavarayan	"Kaathavaraya Saamy"	
2013	Haridas	"Vellakuthirai"	
2018	Junga	"Rise of Junga"	
2018	Sandakozhi 2	"Sengarattan Paaraiyila"	
2019	Nenjamundu Nermaiyundu Odu Raja	"Internet Pasanga"	
2019	Kaappaan	"Sirukki"	
2020	Neekosam Nireekshana (D)	"Sridevi Death Song"	Telugu song

== Filmography ==
- Bommai Nayagi (2023)
