= Mr Zoo Keeper =

2025 Tamil film by J. Suresh

- Theatrical release poster
- Directed by: J. Suresh
- Written by: J. Suresh
- Produced by: S. Rajarathinam; A. Arockiadass
- Starring: Pugazh; Shirin Kanchwala
- Cinematography: Tanveer Mohidin
- Edited by: Azeeb KS
- Music by: Yuvan Shankar Raja
- Production company: J4 Studios
- Distributed by: E5 Entertainment
- Release date: 1 August 2025
- Country: India
- Language: Tamil

Mr Zoo Keeper is a 2025 Indian Tamil-language film written and directed by J. Suresh, starring Pugazh and Shirin Kanchwala in the lead roles. The film is produced by S. Rajarathinam and A. Arockiadass under J4 Studios banner and the technical team consists of music composer Yuvan Shankar Raja, cinematographer Tanveer Mohidin, and editor Azeeb KS.

Mr Zoo Keeper released in theatres on 1 August 2025.

== Plot ==
Chinna Thambi (Pugazh), brings home a baby tiger at his son's insistence, mistaking it for a wild stray. He conspires to hide the growing cub from his wife Deepika (Shirin Kanchwala), all while a forest ranger, Abdullah, begins a frantic search for the very same animal. The stage is thus set for a story that wants to be both a heartwarming fable and a sharp-toothed cautionary tale.

== Cast ==
- Pugazh as Chinna Thambi
- Shirin Kanchwala as Deepika
- Singampuli as Jeeva
- Imman Annachi as Dinesh
- Pyramid Kumar as Arun
- Marimuthu as Shiva
- Muthukaalai as Raja

== Production ==
On 20 March 2022, Yuvan Shankar Raja released the first look poster of the film titled Mr Zoo Keeper in an episode of Cooku with Comali season 3, having television-actor-turned-comedian Pugazh in his debut as the male lead. The film is written and directed by J. Suresh, and Shirin Kanchwala was chosen to portray the female lead. Apart from Pugazh and Kanchwala, the film also features Marimuthu, Singampuli, Imman Annachi and Pyramid Kumar in key roles. The film is produced by S. Rajarathinam and A. Arockiadass under J4 Studios banner and the technical team consists of music composer Yuvan Shankar Raja, cinematographer Tanveer Mohidin, editor Azeeb KS, art director Samuel Rajan and stunt choreographer Pradeep Dinesh.

It was reported that the principal photography began on 20 March 2022 in Ooty. In late-May 2022, Pugazh announced that the filming is to be carried out in Philippines. Kanchwala in an interview revealed that filming took place in a tiger park in Thailand.

== Music ==
Mr Zoo Keeper

Soundtrack album by Yuvan Shankar Raja
- Studio: U1 Records
- Genre: Feature film soundtrack
- Language: Tamil
- Label: U1 Records
- Producer: Yuvan Shankar Raja

Yuvan Shankar Raja chronology
Maareesan (2025)	Mr Zoo Keeper (2025)	Kombuseevi (2025)

Singles from Mr Zoo Keeper
- 1. "Kuttipuli" Released: 17 January 2024; 2. "Santhosha Saaral Mazhai" Released: 6 February 2024; 3. "Neethane Enadhu Thozhamai" Released: 14 March 2024.

The film has music and background composed by Yuvan Shankar Raja. The first single "Kuttipuli" was released on 17 January 2024. The second single "Santhosha Saaral Mazhai" was released on 6 February 2024. The third single "Neethane Enadhu Thozhamai" was released on 14 March 2024.

Track listing
No.	Title	Lyrics	Singer(s)	Length
1.	"Kuttipuli"	Gangai Amaren	Yuvan Shankar Raja, Anthony Daasan
2.	"Santhosha Saaral Mazhai"	Gangai Amaren, Snehan	Yuvan Shankar Raja, Adithya RK
3.	"Neethane Enadhu Thozhamai"	Snehan	Yuvan Shankar Raja, Sai Vignesh

== Release ==
Mr Zoo Keeper released in theatres on 1 August 2025. Earlier it was scheduled for 3 May 2024 and then for 27 June 2025.

== Reception ==
Abhinav Subramanian of The Times of India gave 2/5 stars and wrote "Mr. Zoo Keeper brings home a powerful idea and then discovers it didn't have the first clue how to tame it into a coherent story." Jayabhuvaneshwari B of Cinema Express wrote "The film’s noble message on conservation falters due to weak performances, flawed editing, slow pacing, and inconsistent storytelling."
