= Parithabangal Gopi–Sudhakar =

Indian YouTubers duo

Gopi–Sudhakar
- Occupations: YouTubers, actors
- Years active: 2017–present

YouTube information
- Channel: @Parithabangal

Parithabangal Gopi–Sudhakar is an Indian Tamil stand-up comedy YouTuber and actor duo consisting of Gopi Aravind Raja (b. 19 November 1995) and Sudhakar Jayaraman (b. 1 October 1995). The duo predominantly appear in satirical videos of their official YouTube handle Parithabangal. Their videos also feature Dravid Selvam, RS, Aravind, Shyam, and others.

== Career ==
The duo have predominantly featured in comedy YouTube videos in their official YouTube channel Parithabangal and subsequently gained significant fanfare over the years. Gopi and Sudhakar often compiled videos by incorporating usual conversations and daily life styles of people in humorous manner. The duo also appeared in films mostly confined to minor roles in Meesaya Murukku (2017), Mersal (2017), Uriyadi 2 (2019), Seven (2019), Zombie (2019) and Nenjamundu Nermaiyundu Odu Raja (2019) before going on to play more prominent roles. Gopu and Sudhakar have also appeared independent of each other in a few films.

The duo also collaborated to form Parithabangal Productions in 2018 with the intention of producing films under their production banner. In 2019, Parithabangal Gopi and Sudhakar announced that they would be making their debut production venture through the film Hey Money Come Today Go Tomorrow, albeit with the support of crowdfunding campaign. At the time of the film's launch, the film was speculated by media to be Asia's biggest crowd-funded film and was also speculated to be a landmark Indian Tamil-language film as the interest on the film project was rekindled due to the source of funds being used for the film to go on floors. However, both Gopi and Sudhakar decided to shelve the production of the film due to the onset of the COVID-19 pandemic and financial constraints. Their Untitled Project #2 and Oh God Beautiful were also dropped.

== Legal issues ==
In 2021, the duo were embroiled in a controversy for promoting Super Backer App in their Parithabangal YouTube channel as the app was at the forefront of a multi-crore scam having defrauded many individuals. Gopi and Sudhakar were also accused of possible misuse of their subscribers money by promoting such malicious apps. The duo stated that they were approached by the Super Backer app to advertise it, and just like they do with various other businesses, they accepted to do so, but they have no affiliation with the app's makers.

In September 2024, Parithabangal faced lawsuit threats and defamation case over their political satirical video titled Laddu Paavangal, covering content about the controversies pertaining to the alleged usage of ingredients such as animal fat to prepare Tirupati laddu. The video received mixed feedback, with some viewers finding it a delightful and light-hearted while others criticized it, accusing the creators of offending religious sentiments. Both Gopi and Sudhakar apologised for the video and deleted it from their YouTube channel after criticism mounted. A case was lodged against Gopi and Sudhakar to the DGP of Andhra Pradesh by the Bharatiya Janata Party (BJP) and was later withdrawn after the duo apologized to BJP. Thirty-five popular YouTube creators came together to condemn the BJP for threatening Gopi and Sudhakar.

== Filmography ==
Year	Title	Actor		Notes
Year	Title	Gopi	Sudhakar	Notes
2017	Meesaya Murukku	Yes	Yes	
2017	Mersal	Yes	Yes	
2019	Uriyadi 2	No	Yes	
2019	Seven	Yes	Yes	
2019	Zombie	Yes	Yes	
2019	Nenjamundu Nermaiyundu Odu Raja	Yes	Yes	
2023	Odavum Mudiyadhu Oliyavum Mudiyadhu	Yes	Yes	
2026	Idhayam Murali	No	Yes	Also featuring Dravid Selvam
2026	Anbe Diana	Yes	No	
TBA	Jolliya Iruntha Oruthan	No	Yes	
