= Chutti Aravind =

Indian actor

- Born: Aravind Parameswaran; March 1982 (age 44)
- Occupations: Actor; mimicry artist; comedian; Musician singer
- Years active: 2006–present
- Spouse: Sandhya (m. 2014)

Aravind Parameswaran, popularly known by his stage name Chutti Aravind, is an Indian actor, mimicry artist , Comedian and Singer / Musician who is currently working in the Tamil film industry. He debuted in the Tamil film Chennai Kadhal in 2006. In 2022, he participated in the popular cooking show Cooku with Comali (season 3) as a contestant in Star Vijay. 30 years experience in stage life awarded by Kumudham magazine on Oct 2026.

== Career ==
Aravind made his acting debut with Chennai Kadhal (2006), directed by Vikraman. After a brief sabbatical, he made his comeback in the 2013 film Oruvar Meethu Iruvar Sainthu playing a supporting role in the film. He was later seen in films such as Jannal Oram (2013), Vaigai Express (2017), Natpe Thunai (2019) and Nenjamundu Nermaiyundu Odu Raja (2019). Aravind also participated in television shows such as Kalakka Povathu Yaaru in 2015. He and RJ Vigneshkanth formed the YouTube channels "Smile Settai" and later Blacksheep. He later joined the cooking show Cooku with Comali (season 3) as a contestant; however, he was later eliminated from the show due to poor cooking efforts.

== Filmography ==
Year	Film	Role	Notes
2006	Chennai Kadhal	Gautham's friend	
2012	Murattu Kaalai		
2013	Thirumathi Thamizh	Himself	Cameo appearance
2013	Oruvar Meethu Iruvar Sainthu	Aravind	
2013	Jannal Oram	Shanmugam	Conductor
2017	Vaigai Express	Balu	
2019	Natpe Thunai	Harichandran's PA	
2019	Nenjamundu Nermaiyundu Odu Raja	Ram	Annan
2024	PT Sir	Mortuary doctor	Uncredited
2026	Mr.Bharath	Constable	
2027	Dayangaram		

== Television ==
Year	Show	Role	Channel	Notes
2006	Kalakka Povathu Yaaru	Contestant	Star Vijay	
2007	Asatha Povadhu Yaaru	Contestant	Sun Tv	
2008	Ellamae Siriputhan	Contestant	Kalaignar Tv	
2010	Comedy Jodies	Contestant	Zee Tamil	
2013	Home Minister	Anchor	Zee Tamil	
2016	Isaiyodu Vilaiyaadu	Host	Sun Music	
2017	Kallakka Povadhu Yaaru Champions	Contestant	Star Vijay	
2021	Atti Talks	Host	Sun Music	
2021	Chumma Kizhi	Anchor & Manasaatchi	Sun TV	
2022	Cooku with Comali (season 3)	Contestant	Star Vijay	Eliminated
2022	Raju Vootla Party	Patti Ma	Star Vijay	
2023	Accidental Farmer and Co	Moorthy	SonyLIV	
