= Natpe Thunai =

2019 Indian film by D. Parthiban Desingu

- Theatrical release poster
- Directed by: D. Parthiban Desingu
- Written by: Sreekanth Vasrp; Devesh Jeyachandran
- Produced by: Sundar C Khushbu
- Starring: Hiphop Tamizha; Anagha; Karu Pazhaniappan; Harish Uthaman
- Cinematography: Aravinnd Singh
- Edited by: Fenny Oliver
- Music by: Hiphop Tamizha
- Production company: Avni Movies
- Distributed by: Screen Scene Media Entertainment
- Release date: 4 April 2019
- Running time: 155 minutes
- Country: India
- Language: Tamil

Natpe Thunai (transl. Friendship is Guidance) is a 2019 Indian Tamil-language sports drama film directed by D. Parthiban Desingu in his directorial debut, while Sreekanth Vasrp and Devesh Jeyachandran wrote the story, screenplay and dialogues. Produced by Sundar C and Khushbu under the banner Avni Movies, the film stars Adhi of Hiphop Tamizha, newcomer Anagha, Karu Pazhaniappan and Harish Uthaman, alongside actors Shah Ra, Pandiarajan and Kausalya. It is based on the sport of field hockey.

This is the second film of Adhi as a lead male actor, after Meesaya Murukku (2017). Apart from acting he also scored the music, while Aravinnd Singh and Fenny Oliver handled the cinematography and editing respectively. The film released on 4 April 2019. In 2021, it was remade in Telugu as A1 Express.

== Plot ==
Prabhakaran is a happy-go-lucky youngster in Pondicherry whose only ambition is to move to France. To that end, he goes to Karaikal, where he falls in love with Deepa, a hockey player. Through her, he comes in contact with Shanmugam, a kindhearted retired military man who is the coach of the local hockey team.

A corporate is after the ground where Shanmugam's players practice, and they are aided by the local politician Harichandran. By filing a RTI petition about the company, Shanmugam learns about the corporation's plan to build a factory in the ground which will pollute the nearby rivers and harm the nearby villagers. Now to save the ground from the corporate and Harichandran, Shanmugam's students should play with the Pondicherry hockey team and win the match. While selecting the hockey players for his team, he learns that Prabha was the 2012 Junior World Cup Indian hockey team captain who was banned for three years. When Shanmugam asks Prabha to join their hockey team and help them win the match, he refuses and narrates his past and his reasons for leaving hockey.

Prabha and Azhar, his childhood friend, are both hockey players. Prabha is an attacker in his team, while Azhar plays in defence in the same team. Prabha, after being selected by national selectors, joins the Indian hockey team and later becomes the captain of the 2012 Junior World Cup competition's Indian hockey team, but Azhar is rejected in the Indian hockey team and asks about this to his coach, who mocks his desire to play hockey as well as his financial status and instead tells him to help his father in his fishing business. Because of this, Azhar commits suicide in grief, and one of Prabha's friends loses his leg to an oncoming train when he tries to save him. When Prabha learns of this, he gets furious and beats up his coach, because of which he is banned for three years.

Later, Shanmugam decides to protest against the corporate company's unit being set up there with the help of his students and the local people, but Harichandran uses his dirty tricks and prevents Shanmugam from becoming successful in his protest. Harichandran later acquaints with Prabha's former coach to thwart Shanmugam's team from winning the hockey tournament.

After seeing the local people suffering, Prabha decides to join the hockey team and get back the ground. Shanmugam and Prabha train the players, and later, after facing so many difficulties, they win the match and get their ground back. When they come back to the ground, they see Harichandran, who has lost his position now, giving a speech to the press as feeling happy for Shanmugam team's victory. He comes to Prabha and blames the common people for voting leaders monetary benefits and questions Prabha if the people will elect a person who is doing good for them without any money, for which Prabha is unable to find an answer.

== Cast ==
- Hiphop Tamizha Adhi as Prabhakaran alias Prabha
- Anagha as Deepa
- Karu Pazhaniappan as Harichandran, Pondhicherry Sports Minister
- Harish Uthaman as Shanmugam
- Shah Ra as Sridhar
- Eruma Saani Vijay as Bravo (Pradeeshwaran Veerapan)
- Ashwin Jerome as Aasif
- Vinoth Kumar as Pandiyan
- RJ Vigneshkanth as Frankie
- Pandiarajan as Arulbose
- Kausalya as Prabha's mother
- Elango Kumaravel as Prabha's former corrupt coach
- Bijili Ramesh as Bruce Lee
- Ajay Ghosh as Deenadayalan, Deepa's father
- "Put Chutney" Rajmohan as Prakash
- Pondy Ravi as Abdul Marakkayar, Aasif's father
- Guhan Prakash as Azhar
- Mannai Sathik as 'Legend' Mahesh
- Deepthi as Deepa's friend
- 'Black Sheep 'Thyagarajan as a hockey player
- Tiger Garden Thangadurai as Durai
- Poovendhan as Kadhir
- R. S. Chelladurai as sharbat seller
- Chutti Aravind as Harichandran's PA
- Prashanth Rangaswamy as himself
- 'Think Music' Santhosh Kumar in a guest appearance

D. Parthiban Desingu, editor Fenny Oliver, and writers Sreekanth Vasrp, and Devesh Jeyachandran appeared in cameo appearances as stage singers and performers in Sridhar's sister's marriage function during the song "Single Pasanga".

== Production ==
After a successful outing in Meesaya Murukku, director Sundar C revealed that he is all set to produce another venture that would have Hiphop Tamizha on a film written and directed by debutante Parthiban Desingu which is a film based on hockey. The pooja was held in mid-December, and Hiphop Tamizha confirmed the same by sharing a picture with the film's crew.

== Music ==
The soundtrack album was composed by Hiphop Tamizha.

All lyrics are written by Hiphop Tamizha, except where noted.

Track listing
No.	Title	Lyrics	Singer(s)	Length
1.	"Kerala Song"	Hiphop Tamizha	Hiphop Tamizha	3:57
2.	"Single Pasanga" (Lyrics written by Arivu)	Arivu	Ka Ka Balachander, Gana Ulagam Dharani, Arivu	3:44
3.	"Aathadi"	Hiphop Tamizha	Hiphop Tamizha, V. M. Mahalingam	3:27
4.	"Pallikoodam – The Farewell Song"	Hiphop Tamizha	Sanjith Hegde	3:04
5.	"Veedhikor Jaadhi" (Lyrics written by Hiphop Tamizha, Arivu and Sollisai Selvandhar)	Hiphop Tamizha	Hiphop Tamizha, Arivu, Sollisai Selvandhar, Sanjith Hegde	2:41
6.	"Morattu Single"	Hiphop Tamizha	Sathyaprakash, Hiphop Tamizha	3:06
7.	"Vengamavan"	Hiphop Tamizha	Hiphop Tamizha, Chinnaponnu	3:37
8.	"Natpe Thunai – Title Track" (Lyrics written by Dr. Vadugam Sivakumar)	Dr. Vadugam Sivakumar	Sanjith Hegde, Kaushik Krish	3:54
9.	"Madham Madham" (Additional Song – Featured only in the end credits of the film)	Hiphop Tamizha	Hiphop Tamizha	4:20
10.	"Keezh Veezhndhal"		Hiphop Tamizha
Total length:				32:03

== Release and reception ==
The film was released in theatres on 4 April 2019. Janani K of India Today wrote, "Hip Hop Adhi struggles in film stuffed with social messages". Sreedhar Pillai wrote for Firstpost, "A visually appealing, thrilling climax saves this run-of-the-mill sports drama". Baradwaj Rangan wrote for Film Companion, "Despite the choppy editing, the final match has a few mildly rousing moments. As a closing punch, we get a reminder to vote responsibly during elections". Sify rated 3 out of 5 stars stating "Sports entertainer". M. Suganth of The Times of India rated 3 out of 5 stars stating "Natpe Thunai feels like a blend of plot threads from various films". Srinivasa Ramanujam of The Hindu stated "‘Natpe Thunai’ starring Hip Hop Aadhi packs a punch, especially towards the climax".

S. Subhakeerthana of The Indian Express rated 2 out of 5 stars stating "This Aadhi starrer has all the predictable tropes of a sports film but fails to throw up surprises". Anjana Shekar of The News Minute rated 2 out of 5 stars stating "Sports drama is not new to Tamil cinema but 'Natpe Thunai' spins the package around a new game and a new landscape". Ashameera Aiyappan of Cinema Express rated 1.5 out of 5 stars stating "The film is stuck between trying to be a mindless entertainer and taking itself seriously, with a generous infusion of meme material from our social media timelines". Karthik Kumar of Hindustan Times rated 2 out of 5 stars stating "Natpe Thunai tries to be too many things at the same time -- it is a sports film that is also a friendship drama and has a political sub-plot. In the end, it does justice to none of the genres".
