= Nenjamundu Nermaiyundu Odu Raja =

2019 Indian Tamil-language film by Karthik Venugopalan

- Theatrical release poster
- Directed by: Karthik Venugopalan
- Written by: Hp Venugopalan
- Screenplay by: Hp Venugopalan
- Story by: Karthik Venugopalan
- Produced by: Sivakarthikeyan
- Starring: Rio Raj; Shirin Kanchwala; RJ Vigneshkanth
- Cinematography: U. K. Senthil Kumar
- Edited by: Fenny Oliver - Tamil Arasan
- Music by: Shabir
- Production company: Sivakarthikeyan Productions
- Release date: 14 June 2019
- Running time: 128 minutes
- Country: India
- Language: Tamil

Nenjamundu Nermaiyundu Odu Raja (transl. You've got a heart, you've got integrity, so run, kiddo) is a 2019 Indian Tamil-language comedy drama film written and directed by Karthik Venugopalan in his directorial debut. The film stars Rio Raj (in his lead acting debut), Shirin Kanchwala, and RJ Vigneshkanth, while Nanjil Sampath, Vivek Prasanna, and Radha Ravi play supportive roles. The film is produced by actor Sivakarthikeyan under his production banner Sivakarthikeyan Productions. Singaporean composer Shabir was roped into score music for the film.

== Plot ==
The film starts with Shiva (Rio Raj) and Vicky (RJ Vigneshkanth) getting a lift in a car as their bike broke down while going to a place. Then, they think about their past life. A few months ago, Shiva and Vicky, along with their childhood brother Ram (Chutti Aravind), were living in a rented house. Ram has some respect for his house owner (Mayilsamy), but the other two do not.

Shiva and Vicky both have a YouTube channel called "Nenjamundu Nermaiyundu". One day, they go to a mall and play a prank for their YouTube videos. They both keep knives on the neck of a big businessman named "Jeepakaran" (Radha Ravi) and a press reporter named "Nisha" (Shirin Kanchwala). Jeepakaran realises that the two men are doing a prank and openly tells them so. Angered by this, Nisha slaps Shiva. Then, Jeepakaran calls Shiva and Vicky and asks them why they are doing these pranks, to which they say that it is to earn money. The next day, Shiva, Vicky, and Ram help two beggars in Marina Beach, and Nisha sees this. She and Shiva fall in love, but they don't reveal it to each other. Hence, they both remain unaware of the other's love.

The same day, Shiva and Vicky realize that Jeepakaran's PA (Put Chutney Rajmohan) is following them. Jepakaran assigns three tasks to Shiva and Vicky: be part of a breaking news, elect a mentally-challenged guy as an MLA, and stop a murder in a railway station. They complete the first two tasks but want to know the reason for the third. Here, Jeepakaran unfolds his flashback. His son Anbu ("Idhu Adhu Illa" Ayaz) had wished to be a reporter, but his father wanted him to take over his business. Uninterested, Anbu joined a TV channel. One day, he overhears a plan for a murder and plans to stop it. Unfortunately, he fails in the attempt because the people did not help him, resulting in him getting killed.

Angered by this, Jeepakaran decides to elect a mentally challenged man as an MLA and fulfill his son's wish by using Shiva and Vicky. They complete the third task and save the girl from the murder plan.

== Cast ==
- Rio Raj as Shiva
- Shirin Kanchwala as Nisha
- RJ Vigneshkanth as Vicky
- Nanjil Sampath as a Politician, Nisha's father
- Radha Ravi as Jeepakaran, Anbu's father
- Mayilswamy as House Owner
- Vivek Prasanna as Local Goon
- Bijili Ramesh as Bijili Ramesh, a politician
- Janani Balasubramaniam as Jeepakaran's Assistant
- "Idhu Adhu Illa" Ayaz as Anbu
- Chutti Aravind as Ram, Shiva's brother
- "Naan Komali" Ram Nishanth as Mani
- VJ Siddhu as Mani's Trainer
- Settai Sherif as Minister's son
- "Put Chutney" Rajmohan as Jeepakaran's PA
- "Kutty Munji" Vivek Anandan as Kutty Munji
- Prakash Arumugam as Reporter
- Sabari as Newsreader
- Balaji Thyagarajan as Youngster
- "Ival" Nandhini
- Madan Gowri (cameo appearance)
- Parithabangal Gopi & Sudhakar (Cameo Appearance)
- Aravinth Seiju (Cameo Appearance)

== Production ==
The film cast consists mainly of YouTube personalities (YouTubers) from a YouTube channel called Black Sheep including the director, VJ turned-lead actor Rio Raj and RJ-turned comedian RJ Vigneshkanth. It also includes many YouTube personalities. The film was announced by debutant director Karthik Venugopal and chose his close YouTube mates Rio Raj and RJ Vigneshkanth to play the pivotal roles in the film. Actor Sivakarthikeyan willingly came forward to help the filmmakers as producer, marking his second production venture after the critically acclaimed Kanaa. It was revealed that the producer initially set a tentative title as Nenjamundu Nermaiyundu and it was later modified as Nenjamundu Nermaiyundu Odu Raja. The film title is also apparently taken from a 1970 film, En Annan which starred veteran actor-politician MGR in the lead role.

== Soundtrack ==
The soundtrack was composed by Shabir.

Nenjamundu Nermaiyundu Odu Raja

Soundtrack album by Shabir
- Released: 2019
- Genre: Feature film soundtrack
- Length: 18:34
- Language: Tamil
- Producer: Shabir

Shabir chronology
Dhilluku Dhuddu 2 (2019)	Nenjamundu Nermaiyundu Odu Raja (2019)	Raju Gari Gadhi 3 (2019)

No.	Title	Lyrics	Singer(s)	Length
1.	"Nenjamundu Nermaiyundu Odu Raja (Title Track)"	Kannadasan	Shabir	04:44
2.	"Internet Pasanga"	RJ Vigneshkanth	Shabir, Rockstar Ramani Ammal, Diwakar	03:20
3.	"Thuppuna Thodachikuven"	Kumaran Kumanan	Anthony Daasan	02:22
4.	"Anbin Vazhi"	Priyan	Shabir, Sharanya Srinivas, Aishwarya, Sahana Niren Kumar	04:26
5.	"Muttathey Muttathey"	Kiran Varthan	Ranjith, Janani Venkat	03:42
Total length:				18:34

== Reception ==
Thinkal Menon of The Times of India gave 2.5/5 stars and wrote, "Nenjamundu Nermaiyundu Odu Raja starts off as a fun film which later gets into serious mode. With a bevy of artistes who are popular on social media, the movie has a decent story and a not-so-bad screenplay." Navein Darshan of Cinema Express gave 1.5/5 stars and wrote, "NNOR is yet another 'checklist' film that aims to impress all sorts of audience, but the only boxes it ticks are the wrong ones." Pradeep Kumar of The Hindu wrote, "At less than two hours of runtime, Nenjamundu Nermaiyundu Odu Raja feels like a longer version of a YouTube spoof video." Anupama Subramanian of Deccan Chronicle wrote, "One wished that Karthik Venugopal had worked more on the script and presentation, which otherwise looks like watching an extended version of YouTube parodies."
