= Dhandayuthapani =

- Directed by: Saravana Sakthi
- Written by: Saravana Sakthi
- Produced by: C. N. Rajadurai
- Starring: S. Suresh Raja; Shivani Sri
- Cinematography: Ruthrun
- Edited by: B. S. Vasu; Saleem
- Music by: Sunil; E. L. Indhrajith
- Production company: CNR Films
- Release date: 27 April 2007
- Running time: 125 minutes
- Country: India
- Language: Tamil

Dhandayuthapani is a 2007 Indian Tamil language action film directed by Saravana Sakthi. The film stars newcomers S. Suresh Raja and Shivani Sri, with Manoj K. Jayan, Bobby, Soori, Kadhal Sukumar, Ranjitha, Viji Ketti, Balu Anand, and Mahanadhi Shankar playing supporting roles. The film was produced by C. N. Rajadurai and released on 27 April 2007.

== Plot ==
Dhandayuthapani (S. Suresh Raja) is a carefree and jobless graduate who lives with his widowed mother and siblings in Madurai. One day, he falls in love with a college student Thenmozhi (Shivani Sri), whom he sees in a temple. Dhandayuthapani then bumps into Thenmozhi in various situations, and they slowly fall in love, but the lovers do not exchange a single word throughout their interactions. Meanwhile, Thamizharasu (Manoj K. Jayan) and Yaanai Kumar (Bobby), two rival gangsters, are fighting over some government-owned land. Later, Yaanai Kumar's henchmen plan to murder Thamizharasu. but they spy Thenmozhi taking a bath in her house. Dhandayuthapani, who notices this, chases them and beats them up in front of Thamizharasu.

Impressed by Dhandayuthapani's bravery, Thamizharasu offers him a place in his gang, but he refuses. The cunning Thamizharasu then sends his henchmen, who brutally attack Dhandayuthapani and lie to him, claiming they are Yaanai Kumar's henchmen. Left half-tonsured, naked, and wounded, Dhandayuthapani manages to survive the assault. His family and his friends, who fear for his life, advise him to leave the town. However, the incident leads to a drastic change in Dhandayuthapani's behaviour, and a vengeful Dhandayuthapani joins Thamizharasu's gang. Dhandayuthapani slowly becomes Thamizharasu's best henchman, and he shows his loyalty by killing Yaanai Kumar. However, Dhandayuthapani, who knew from the beginning that Thamizharasu was the culprit, kills him as well. The film ends with Thenmozhi marrying another man and a rowdy killing Dhandayuthapani.

== Cast ==
- S. Suresh Raja as Dhandayuthapani
- Shivani Sri as Thenmozhi
- Manoj K. Jayan as Thamizharasu
- Bobby as Yaanai Kumar
- Soori as Dhandayuthapani's friend
- Kadhal Sukumar as Dhandayuthapani's friend
- Ranjitha as Sandhya
- Viji Ketti as Dhandayuthapani's mother
- Balu Anand as Judge
- Mahanadi Shankar as Thamizharasu's henchman
- Besant Ravi as Yaanai Kumar's henchman
- Sampath Ram as Yaanai Kumar's henchman
- Saravana Sakthi as Vengai Pandi
- Nisha in a special appearance

== Production ==
Saravana Sakthi, an erstwhile assistant of S. A. Chandrasekhar, made his directorial debut with Dhandayuthapani under the banner of CNR Films. C. N. Rajadurai who is a doctor by profession had emerged as a producer in this film. S. Suresh Raja was cast to play the title role while Kerala-based Vidhya Mohan, credited as Shivani Sri, was chosen to play the heroine. The fight scenes had been choreographed by Jaguar Thangam, Ruthrun took in charge of cinematography, the music was composed by Sunil and E. L. Indhrajith and the editing was by B. S. Vasu and Saleem. The film was primarily shot in Nagercoil and Madurai.

== Soundtrack ==
Dhandayuthapani

Soundtrack album by Sunil and E. L. Indhrajith
- Released: 2006
- Recorded: 2006
- Genre: Feature film soundtrack
- Length: 16:48
- Label: New Music
- Producers: Sunil; E. L. Indhrajith

The film score and the soundtrack were composed by film composers Sunil and E. L. Indhrajith. The soundtrack features four tracks with lyrics written by Yosi, Tamilamuthan and Saravana Sakthi.

Tracklist
| No. | Title | Singer(s) | Length |
|---|---|---|---|
| 1. | "Adikkadi Ethayathil" | Harish Raghavendra, Harini Sudhakar | 4:05 |
| 2. | "Athadi Alaiasathada" | C. N. S., Anuradha Sriram | 3:36 |
| 3. | "Katrum Puyalum" | Ranjith | 4:10 |
| 4. | "Vanam Muzhuvathum" | Vijay Yesudas | 4:57 |
| Total length: | | | 16:48 |

== Reception ==
A reviewer wrote, "The only thing which is laudable in this movie is the bold attempt made by debutants" and added, "Heroine Shivani has performed well in a limited scope. Music by Sunil Indirajith is laudable". Malini Mannath said, "Suresh Raja may be a far cry from the typical hero-mould. But he performs his scenes with understanding, and like a seasoned actor. Shivani fits in as the coy Thenmozhi" and called it "a promising work from a debutant director".
