= Billa Pandi =

2018 Indian Tamil-language film

- Film poster
- Directed by: Raj Sethupathy
- Written by: M.M.S. Moorthy
- Produced by: K.C.Prabath
- Starring: R. K. Suresh; Chandini Tamilarasan; Indhuja Ravichandran
- Cinematography: KC Prabath
- Edited by: Raja Mohammad
- Music by: Ilayavan
- Production companies: J K Film Productions; May - 1 Global Media
- Release date: 6 November 2018
- Running time: 140 minutes
- Country: India

Billa Pandi, also spelled as Billa Paandi, is a 2018 Indian Tamil language romantic action drama film written and directed by Raj Sethupathy. The film stars R. K. Suresh, Chandini Tamilarasan, and Indhuja Ravichandran in the lead roles while Thambi Ramaiah, G. Marimuthu and Sangili Murugan play supportive roles. The music for the film is composed by Ilayavan while cinematography is handled by M Jeevan. A possible Hindi remake of the film was announced prior to the film's release during October 2018 and the remake rights were sold to Arihant, son of film producer Ashok Kumar with the remake is expected to go on floors from January 2019. The film was released on 6 November 2018 on the eve of Diwali. This film was average in the box office.

== Plot ==
A die hard Ajith fan, Billa Pandi (R. K. Suresh), works as a construction contractor and dedicates the rest of his time to helping others in his neighborhood. He is in love with his aunt's daughter Valli (Chandini Tamilarasan), but life drastically changes for him when Jayalakshmi (Indhuja Ravichandran), whose family's house he'd recently constructed, falls in love with him.

== Cast ==
- R. K. Suresh as Billa Pandi
- Chandini Tamilarasan as Valli
- Indhuja Ravichandran as Jayalakshmi
- G. Marimuthu as Valli's father
- Sangili Murugan as Jayalakshmanan
- Thambi Ramaiah
- K. C. Prabath
- Amudhavanan
- Hello Kandasamy
- Thavasi Thevar
- Vidharth (special appearance)

== Filming ==
This film marked R. K. Suresh's first lead role in a Tamil film. The filmmakers also revealed that the film is based on a person who plays the role of Thala Ajith's fan, and he forces two women to love him as no girl would consider him. The filmmakers also revealed that the film is dedicated to the fans of Ajith Kumar. The portions of the film were shot and set in Madurai.

== Reception ==
V Lakshmi critic of Times of india gave 2.5 out of 5 and stated that "If only the makers had concentrated on getting to the context of the story soon enough and not ODed on Ajith, this could have made for an entertaining watch.". Ashameera Aiyappan critic of The New Indian Express gave one star out of five and wrote that "The best thing about Billa Pandi is probably that I didn’t have to watch it on Diwali"
