= Ullasam (2022 film) =

2022 Malayalam film

- Directed by: Jeevan Jojo
- Written by: Praveen Balakrishnan
- Produced by: Joe Kaithamattom; Christi Kaithamattom
- Starring: Shane Nigam; Pavithra Lakshmi; Aju Varghese
- Cinematography: Swaroop Philip
- Edited by: Johnkutty
- Music by: Gopi Sundar; Shaan Rahman
- Production company: Kaithamattom Brothers
- Distributed by: Kalasangham Films
- Release date: 1 July 2022
- Country: India
- Language: Malayalam

Ullasam (transl. Joy) is a 2022 Indian Malayalam-language romantic comedy film directed by Jeevan Jojo (in his directorial debut) and produced by Joe Kaithamattom and Christi Kaithamattom under the banner Kaithamattom Brothers. It stars Shane Nigam and Pavithra Lakshmi in lead roles.

== Premise ==
Two strangers from diverse backgrounds meet on their return from Ooty to Kerala and are left with the only choice of traveling together. The journey advances through different circumstances and coming across new people. The story takes a turn as they realize that it is nothing but a journey of self-exploration.

== Cast ==
- Shane Nigam as Harry Menon
- Pavithra Lakshmi as Dr. Nima Alex
- Aju Varghese as Sam
- Basil Joseph as Asi
- Deepak Parambol as Arun Mathew
- Renji Panicker as Ramachandran (Cameo)
- Ambika as Mary Kutti
- Hareesh Peradi as Aashaan
- Nayana Elsa as Sona
- Sarayu
- Santhosh Keezhattoor
- Jayaraj Warrier

== Production ==
On 26 March 2019, Sify reported that Shane Nigam had commenced filming of an untitled film with director Jeevan Jojo alongside debutant Pavithra Lakshmi paired opposite him. Filming was underway at Ootty with Munnar, Palakkad and Ernakulam as other locations. It was said to be a romantic comedy film and Aju Varghese, Deepak Parambol and Basil Joseph were also added to the cast. The entire filming was completed in 53 days. The title Ullasam was announced on 21 July 2019 with an image showing the lead character Shane skateboarding. Mohanlal released the film's first-look poster through social medias on 7 February 2020. In an interview with The New Indian Express director Jeevan Jojo described Shane's character in the film as a “carefree, fun-loving youngster.”

The film is written by Praveen Balakrishnan and its soundtrack is composed by Shaan Rahman and Gopi Sundar. Ullasam was released theatrically on 1 July 2022 by Kalasangham Films.

== Reception ==
=== Critical reception ===
The Times of India rated 3.5 out of 5 stars and wrote "A pleasant, light-hearted caper".

=== Box office ===
The film only received nearly 85 lakhs from theatres. The film was a Box-office failure.
