= Portrayals of Sri Lankan Tamils in Indian cinema =

Contributions to popular culture involving direct reference to the Sri Lankan Tamil community in Indian cinema are listed below. All communities that speak (or spoke) Tamil and originally came from Sri Lanka are included. Tamils of Sri Lanka today are a trans-national minority and are found across the globe. While most films on the topic are made in Tamil cinema, there has also been Malayalam and Hindi content on the area.

Portrayals of Sri Lankan Tamils in Indian cinema has regularly caused controversy, with any sentiments which are not pro-Liberation Tigers of Tamil Eelam (LTTE), often being criticised in the South Indian state of Tamil Nadu. As a result, such films have often faced political pressures and threats from Tamil people in Tamil Nadu and the Sri Lankan Tamil diaspora.

Indian cinema has often also been criticised for showing Sri Lankan Tamils as either militants or refugees, rather than as normal people. Key themes often covered by Indian filmmakers when including Sri Lankan Tamil characters in their films include the assassination of Rajiv Gandhi, the end of the Sri Lankan War and tales of the stateless Sri Lankan diaspora in India and abroad.

== Cast and crew members ==
The following actors, actresses and film technicians are ethnically, at least partially, Sri Lankan Tamil by origin. The names are listed from earliest to latest year of entry into the industry.

Actors

- Bonda Mani, supporting actor (Pavunnu Pavunuthan, Thendral Varum Theru, Winner).
- Ceylon Manohar, supporting actor (En Kelvikku Enna Bathil, Mangudi Minor, Naan Potta Savaal).
- J. K. Rithesh, supporting actor (Kaanal Neer, LKG, Nayagan).
- Jai Akash, lead actor (Amudhey, Roja Kootam, Rojavanam).
- Suresh Joachim, actor (Sivappu Mazhai).
- V. I. S. Jayapalan, supporting actor (Aadukalam, Jilla, Madras).
- Vashanth Sellathurai, actor (Ilampuyal, Uyirvarai Iniththaai).
- Teejay Arunasalam, actor (Asuran, Thatrom Thookrom).
- Tharshan Thiyagarajah, actor (Koogle Kuttappa, Naadu).
- Someetharan, actor (Jagame Thandhiram, Iraivi).
- Aravindhan, actor (Aandavan Kattalai, Miga Miga Avasaram).

Actresses

- K. Thavamani Devi, actress (Rajakumari, Sakuntalai, Vana Mohini).
- Radhika, actress (Jeans, Keladi Kanmani, Kizhakku Cheemayile).
- Nirosha, actress (Agni Natchathiram, Inaindha Kaigal, Senthoora Poove).
- Vijayalakshmi, actress (Nagamandala, Bhoomi Thayiya Chochchala Maga, Friends)
- Poongkothai Chandrahasan, actress (Vaanam Vasappadum).
- Joshna Fernando, supporting actress (Irumbu Kuthirai, Marupadiyum Oru Kadhal, Siragugal).
- Madhumila, supporting actress (Mapla Singam, Romeo Juliet, Senjittale En Kadhala).
- Losliya Mariyanesan, actress (Friendship, Koogle Kuttappa).
- Sabby Jey, actress (Karthikeyanum Kaanamal Pona Kadhaliyum).
- Janany Kunaseelan, actress (Leo).
- Shaashvi Bala, actress (Ellaam Mela Irukuravan Paathuppan, Web).
- Raksha Cherin, actress (Thangalaan).

Technical crew

- S. M. Nayagam, film producer (Kumaraguru, Thaai Nadu).
- A. S. A. Sami, film director (Needhipathi, Rajakumari, Velaikari).
- V. C. Guhanathan, film director (Mangudi Minor, Minor Mappillai, Thanikattu Raja).
- Balu Mahendra, film director (Marupadiyum, Moondram Pirai, Sathi Leelavathi).
- K. Karunamoorthy, film producer (Aegan, Peraanmai, Villu).
- K. S. Thurai, film director (Ilampuyal, Uyirvarai Iniththaai).
- Subaskaran Allirajah, film producer (2.0, Chekka Chivantha Vaanam, Kaththi).
- Siva Santhakumar, cinematographer (Pisasu 2).

Musicians

- Niru, composer, (Kalabha Kadhalan, Rameswaram).
- M.I.A., rapper, (Slumdog Millionaire).
- ADK, rapper, (Kadal, Lingaa, O Kadhal Kanmani).
- Arjun, playback singer (Biriyani, Vaaliba Raja, Vanakkam Chennai).
- MC Sai, rapper (Ivanuku Thannila Gandam, Yaadhum Oore Yaavarum Kelir).
- Kharesma Ravichandran, playback singer (Yennai Arindhaal, Thani Oruvan, Kaappaan).
- Inno Genga, playback singer (Kavalai Vendam, Ko 2, Dharala Prabhu).
- Dhee, playback singer (Irudhi Suttru, Maari 2, Soorarai Pottru).
- Luksimi Sivaneswaralingam, playback singer (Bogan, Gangs of Madras).
- Navz-47, rapper (Action, Sarpatta Parambarai).

== 1980s in film ==
=== Punnagai Mannan (1986) ===
K. Balachander's romantic drama film Punnagai Mannan (1986) featured Revathi in the lead role as a Sinhala girl in love with a Tamil dancer. In one scene, she is kidnapped by Sri Lankan Tamils owing to the political tensions in Sri Lanka. At the time of release, the film became a talking point for showing a Sinhala person in a positive light.

== 1990s in film ==
=== Unakkaga Piranthen (1992) ===
Balu Anand's romantic drama film Unakkaga Piranthen (1992) featured the female lead and her grandfather, portrayed by Mohini and Janagaraj, as Sri Lankan Tamil refugees, who take shelter in a refugee camp in India.

=== The Terrorist (1997) ===
Directed by Santhosh Sivan, The Terrorist (1997) had former Prime Minister Rajiv Gandhi's assassination and the Sri Lankan civil war as its backdrop. The film won a number of awards at international film festivals and actor John Malkovich, who first saw the film at the 1998 Cairo International Film Festival, subsequently adopted the film as an executive producer. Critic Roger Ebert has included the film in his series of "Great Movies" reviews.

== 2000s in film ==
=== Thenali (2000) ===
The comedy drama Thenali (2000), directed by K. S. Ravikumar, featured Kamal Haasan in the lead role of a Sri Lankan Tamil refugee, who has come to Chennai for psychiatric treatment. His numerous phobias had developed due to the trauma he encountered during the Sri Lankan Civil War. In order to get his Jaffna accent correct, Kamal Haasan took lessons from prominent television host, B. H. Abdul Hameed.

=== Kaatrukkenna Veli (2001) ===
Pugazhendhi Thangaraj's drama film Kaatrukkenna Veli (2001) told the story of a former LTTE fighter moving to India. Actors including Arun Pandian, Khushbu and Sujitha portrayed Sri Lankan Tamils.

=== Nandhaa (2001) ===
Bala's drama film Nandhaa (2001) featured the female lead, portrayed by Laila, as a Sri Lankan Tamil refugee, who takes shelter in a refugee camp in India.

=== Kannathil Muthamittal (2002) ===
Mani Ratnam's family drama Kannathil Muthamittal (2002) was based on a short story, "Amuthavum Avanum" written by Sujatha. The film narrates the tale of a child of Sri Lankan Tamil parentage adopted by Indian parents, whose desire is to meet her biological mother in the midst of the Sri Lankan Civil War. Shoot schedules were carried out in the forests of Kerala to depict the base of the LTTE in northern Sri Lanka. Child actress P. S. Keerthana played the lead role of the child searching for her biological parents, whose characters were essayed by J. D. Chakravarthy and Nandita Das. Other actors who portrayed Sri Lankans included Pasupathy as a LTTE fighter, Sashikumar Subramani as a suicide bomber and Easwari Rao as a woman caught up amid the war. The film went on to win a record of six National Film Awards, the joint highest by any Tamil film.

=== Cyanide (2006) ===
Directed by A. M. R. Ramesh, the Kannada film Cyanide (2006) had former Prime Minister Rajiv Gandhi's assassination and the Sri Lankan civil war as its backdrop. Also dubbed and released in Tamil as Kuppi, the film won critical acclaim upon release.

=== Aanivaer (2006) ===
John Mahendran's war film Aanivaer (2006) was a love story amid the then ongoing Civil War in Sri Lanka. Distributed by an independent distribution company, Thamizh Thiraikkann, the film was released in Tamil diaspora areas in Australia, Canada, and the United Kingdom. The film was released in India the following year.

=== Kuttrapathirikai (2007) ===
Directed by R. K. Selvamani, Kuttrapathirikai (2007) had former Prime Minister Rajiv Gandhi's assassination and the Sri Lankan civil war as its backdrop. The film began in 1991 and was stuck for fifteen years as the Censor Board refused to allow such a film with a drastic political message to be released. The film finally released in March 2007 with several cuts.

In December 2006, in a landmark judgement, the Madras High Court dismissed a petition filed on behalf of the Central Board of Censors against an earlier verdict by the court, allowing the screening of the film with an 'A' certificate after certain cuts. The petition had earlier alleged that the film supported the banned organization, Liberation Tigers of Tamil Eelam (LTTE). The scenes, which the censors wanted to cut, included the Tigers' training and police officers fleeing the venue, where Rajiv Gandhi was assassinated.

=== Mission 90 Days (2007) ===
The Malayalam political action thriller film Mission 90 Days (2007) by Major Ravi was based on the assassination of Indian prime minister Rajiv Gandhi and the following investigation.

=== Rameswaram (2007) ===
Selvam's drama film Rameswaram (2007) featured the lead actor, portrayed by Jiiva, as a Sri Lankan Tamil refugee, who takes shelter in a refugee camp in India.

=== Other ===
- In Rajiv Menon's Kandukondain Kandukondain (2000), Mammootty's character as an Indian Peace Keeping Force soldier is injured by Sri Lankan Tamil militants during the civil war. He later notes that he holds no personal grudges and actions are common in war.
- In Moulee's Nala Damayanthi (2003), Geethu Mohandas plays a Sri Lankan Tamil Christian.
- In Susi Ganesan's Thiruttu Payale (2006), comedian Vivek plays a spy posing as a Sri Lankan Tamil man from Batticaloa.
- In Kalinga (2006), Nandana's character is shown to be a Sri Lankan Tamil refugee.
- In Mann (2006), the Sri Lankan feudal system is highlighted.
- In Ilampuyal (2009), Vashanth Sellathurai plays a Sri Lankan Tamil residing in Denmark.

== 2010s in film ==
=== Sivappu Mazhai (2010) ===
In Sivappu Mazhai, Suresh Joachim plays a Sri Lankan Tamil who kidnaps Meera Jasmine's character demanding that a Sri Lankan refugee played by Alex be released.

=== Uchithanai Muharnthaal (2011) ===
Pugazhendhi Thangaraj's drama film Uchithanai Muharnthaal (2011) told the story of a young girl from Batticaloa moving to India after being sexually abused. Actress Neenika starred in a lead role.

=== Billa 2 (2012) ===
Chakri Toleti's Billa II (2012) was a prequel to Billa starring Ajith Kumar, and focused on how the lead character of David Billa, an ordinary man from the coastal regions of Sri Lanka, becomes a dreaded underworld don. Owing to the character's development arc, a Tamil academic noted "David Billa is the most desirable portrayal of an Eelam Tamil in Kollywood that any politically sensible Eelam Tamil would prefer".

=== Inam (2013) ===
The war film Inam (2013) by Santhosh Sivan was announced as "a hard-hitting political film scripted around the LTTE-related strife and the death of its leader Velupillai Prabhakaran". In June 2012, Sivan stated "in Inam I want to look at the Sri Lankan situation from the perspective of a bunch of youngsters who get caught in the crisis. It's more about the outsiders' response to the horrors than about the politics". He also told that he will shoot in Sri Lanka after the rains and that he didn't want "Ceylon to look like a tourist's attraction". The film won widespread critical acclaim upon its release.

Post-release, following protests from Thanthai Periyar Dravidar Kazhagam (TDMK) activists, who had attacked the Balaji Theatre in Puducherry, stating the film projects the Sri Lankan Civil War in bad light, four scenes and one dialogue were removed. After Marumalarchi Dravida Munnetra Kazhagam politician Vaiko too severely criticized the film for being pro-Sinhalese, producer N. Linguswamy decided to stop screening and withdraw the film from theatres from 31 March 2014 onwards. He subsequently suffered major financial losses from the film's situation.

=== Madras Cafe (2013) ===
The Hindi political action thriller film Madras Cafe by Shoojit Sircar was released in August 2013. The film was set in the late 1980s and early 1990s, during the time of Indian intervention in the Sri Lankan civil war and assassination of Indian prime minister Rajiv Gandhi. The film deals with an Indian Army special officer who is appointed by the intelligence agency R&AW to head covert operations in Jaffna shortly after Indian peace-keeping force was forced to withdraw. Ajay Rathnam portrayed a character resembling Velupillai Prabhakaran.

The film's alleged negative depiction of rebels in the Sri Lankan civil war raised concerns. DMK leader M Karunanidhi asked the Tamil Nadu government to enquire if the film portrayed Sri Lankan Tamils in a poor light and if so, to take proper action. Replying to the ban demands, John Abraham said while he respects the opinions of everyone, no one is above the Censor board and creativity should not be held at gun point. Following protests in Tamil Nadu and by Tamil diaspora in the United Kingdom, several theatres chose not to screen the film.

=== Massu Engira Masilamani (2015) ===
In the horror comedy film Massu Engira Masilamani (2015) directed by Venkat Prabhu, Suriya portrayed a Sri Lankan Tamil police officer in Quebec City, Canada.

=== Sivappu (2015) ===
Sathyasiva's Sivappu (2015) narrated the story of Sri Lankan refugees who work as construction workers in Tamil Nadu, with Rupa Manjari portraying a Sri Lankan Tamil. A critic noted "the director blends both love and the Sri Lankan Tamil issue equally as he tries to deboss a strong message with the help of a love story. But it ends up being neither here nor there."

=== Aandavan Kattalai (2016) ===
The satirical comedy film Aandavan Kattalai (2016) co-written and directed by M. Manikandan narrated the story of how two men from interior Tamil Nadu struggle to acquire travel documents to fly to London. A key character, Nesan played by Aravindhan, is a Sri Lankan Tamil refugee who has not been given Indian residency permits, and subsequently dodges the authorities. In a key scene, the character portrayed by Yogi Babu attempts to fly to London posing as a Sri Lankan Tamil refugee, only to be deported back to Colombo.

=== Chekka Chivantha Vaanam (2017) ===
Mani Ratnam's Chekka Chivantha Vaanam (2017) featured Aishwarya Rajesh as a Sri Lankan Tamil settler in Dubai, who is married to the character portrayed by Arun Vijay. Critics alluded her role to that of Poonguzhali from the Tamil historical novel Ponniyin Selvan by Kalki Krishnamurthy.

=== Other ===
- In the 2010s, a number of small budget Indian films with strong Sri Lankan Tamil themes were released in Tamil Nadu. This included Ajay Nuthakki's Ravana Desam (2013), Praveen Gandhi's Pulipaarvai (2014), M. S. Anand's Yaazh (2017) and K. Ganeshan's 18.05.2009 (2018). Other films including Kumar G. Venkatesh's Neelam and Sherine Xavier's Muttrupulliyaa were banned for being potential threats to bilateral relationships between India and Sri Lanka.
- Films including Selvaraghavan's Aayirathil Oruvan (2010), A. R. Murugadoss's 7 Aum Arivu (2011) and Atlee's Mersal (2017) had dialogues and themes referencing the plight of Sri Lankan Tamils.
- In A. L. Vijay's Thaandavam (2012), actor Nassar plays a Sri Lankan Tamil police officer in London, UK.
- The tensions surrounding the India–Sri Lanka fisheries dispute of the 2010s was briefly covered in films such as Neerparavai (2012) and Maryan (2013).
- In 2014, Tamil Nadu's political parties and Tamil diaspora protested against the release of A. R. Murugadoss's Kaththi (2014), claiming that Lyca Productions had links to relatives of Sri Lanka president Mahinda Rajapaksa. After time, the protests died down and Lyca Productions have since gone on to become one of the largest production houses in India.
- Udhayathara plays a Sri Lankan Tamil girl who lives in Chennai in Vilai (2010). Parvathy Ratheesh plays a Sri Lankan Tamil girl who lives in the Persian Gulf in the Malayalam film Madhura Naranga (2015).
- The 2017 Telugu film Okkadu Migiladu features Manchu Manoj as an LTTE chief.
- Rahman plays a Sri Lankan Tamil gangster who moves from Detroit to Toronto in the Malayalam film Ranam (2018).
- Rohini played a Sri Lankan Tamil refugee in Kadal Kuthiraigal (2018).
- In October 2018, director Kumar G. Venkatesh announced Seerum Puli, a biopic on LTTE Chief Velupillai Prabhakaran, starring Bobby Simha in the lead role. Despite the announcement, the film has not progressed into production.
- Thanimai (2019) follows a Sri Lankan Tamil mother living in Malaysia portrayed by Sonia Agarwal who returns to Sri Lanka in search of her child.

== 2020s in film ==
=== Meendum Oru Mariyathai (2020) ===
Set in the UK, Bharathirajaa's Meendum Oru Mariyathai (2020) featured several scenes involving the Sri Lankan Tamil community of London.

=== Family Man 2 (2021) ===
The second season of the Hindi web series The Family Man (2021) directed by Raj & DK focused on the separation struggle of Sri Lanka Tamils. The series depicted Tamil Eelam separatist fighters from Tamil Nadu raising a battle, on the command of exiled leaders in London, to assassinate the Indian and Sri Lankan Prime Ministers, who had arranged for a controversial meeting in Chennai. Samantha Ruth Prabhu and Anandsami portrayed Chennai-based Sri Lankan Tamils who eventually embark on a mission to kill. Actors Mime Gopi and Azhagam Perumal played characters loosely based on LTTE Chief Velupillai Prabhakaran and Prime Minister of the Transnational Government of Tamil Eelam, Visvanathan Rudrakumaran.

On 24 May 2021, the Government of Tamil Nadu wrote to the Union government seeking immediate action either to stop or ban the release of the web series on Amazon Prime Video across the country. Mano Thangaraj, Information Technology Minister of Tamil Nadu, in his letter to Prakash Javadekar, Union Minister for Information and Broadcasting, said, "the web series (due to release in June 2021) not only hurt the sentiments of Eelam Tamils but also the feelings of the people of Tamil Nadu and if allowed to broadcast, it would be prejudicial to the maintenance of harmony in the State". The series was however released without any delays on the platform.

=== Methagu (2021) ===
The film is based on the life of leader Velupillai Prabhakaran.

=== Jagame Thandhiram (2021) ===
Karthik Subbaraj's Jagame Thandhiram (2021) is set in the backdrop of the lives of the Sri Lankan Tamil immigrants, who recently moved to London following the conclusion of the Sri Lankan Civil War in 2009. The film's lead actress Aishwarya Lekshmi portrayed a bar singer, who has settled as a refugee in London with her nephew, played by Ashwanth Ashokkumar. A number of actors including Joju George, Kalaiyarasan and Deepak Paramesh are seen as London-based Sri Lankan Tamil gangsters, who are involved in assisting fellow immigrants and smuggling illegal goods. A further character portrayed by Gajaraj is a cook, who left Sri Lanka in the 1970s.

=== Navarasa (2021) ===
The segment Peace directed by Karthik Subbaraj in the television series was set in Sri Lanka during the civil war and shows LTTE militants. The segment is about a boy reuniting with his dog during the war.

=== Rocky (2021) ===
Arun Matheswaran's Rocky is based on a gangster released after 17 years from prison, goes back to his childhood house, searching for his missing sister Amudha, all the while reminiscing his violent past as it comes back to haunt him. Rocky is a Sri Lankan Tamil who desires to flee to Tamil Eelam with his niece to hide from his sins.

=== 800 (2023) ===
800 is a biopic of record-breaking Sri Lankan cricketer Muttiah Muralitharan.

=== Salliyargal (2024) ===
Set during the final stages of the Sri Lankan Civil War, the film follows a group of doctors operating from an underground bunker in Tamil Eelam. Amid the conflict, they provide medical care to both allies and enemies, prioritizing humanitarian duty over political allegiance. The narrative explores themes of compassion, resilience, and ethical integrity in the face of war, drawing inspiration from historical events and cultural values. The film is produced by Karunas.

=== Tourist Family (2025) ===
A film about a Sri Lankan Tamil family that seeks refuge in India due to the Sri Lankan economic crisis.

=== Other ===
- Otrai Panai Maram is about three survivors on a rehabilitation camp in Kilinochchi.
- Methagu 2, a sequel to Methagu (2021), based on the life of Velupillai Prabhakaran was released in 2022.
- Losliya Mariyanesan plays a Sri Lankan Tamil woman in Koogle Kuttappa.
- Yaadhum Oore Yaavarum Kelir (2023) is based on the life of an Eelam refugee.
- In Sorgavaasal, Antonythasan Jesuthasan (Shobasakthi) plays Seelan, an educated Sri Lankan Tamil refugee.
- Salliyargal portrays the life of doctors during the war.
