= Vijeta =

Vijeta or Vijetha may refer to:

- Vijeta (1982 film), an Indian Hindi-language coming-of-age film
- Vijetha (1985 film), an Indian Telugu-language film
- Vijetha (2018 film), an Indian Telugu-language film by Rakesh Sashi
- Vijeta (1996 film), an Indian Hindi-language action film
- Vijeta (2020 film), an Indian Marathi-language sports drama film

== See also ==
- Vijetha Vikram, a 1987 Indian film
- Vijitha, a Sinhalese name
- Vijayta Pandit (born 1967), Indian actress and singer
- Vijayta Films, an Indian film production company
