= Mr. Housekeeping =

2025 Tamil film by Arun Ravichandran

- Theatrical release poster
- Directed by: Arun Ravichandran
- Written by: Arun Ravichandran
- Produced by: N Ramasamy; Nithin Manohar
- Starring: Hari Bhaskar; Losliya Mariyanesan; Ilavarasu; Shah Ra; Rayaan
- Cinematography: Kulothungavarman R
- Edited by: Rama Subbu
- Music by: Osho Venkat
- Production companies: Sri Thenandal Films; Invate Media
- Release date: 24 January 2025
- Running time: 152 minutes
- Country: India
- Language: Tamil

Mr. Housekeeping is a 2025 Indian Tamil-language romantic comedy film written and directed by Arun Ravichandran starring Hari Bhaskar and Losliya Mariyanesan in the lead roles alongside Ilavarasu, Shah Ra, Rayan and others in supporting roles.

Mr. Housekeeping released in theatres on 24 January 2025 to mixed reviews from critics.

== Plot ==
In 2019, Isai ended her relationship with the chauvinistic Honest Raj, on their last day of college. Honest challenged Isai that he would win over a girl's heart and establish a successful life, proving Isai wrong. Four years later, Honest remains a failure in love and jobless. Honest attempts to earn Rs. 5,000 to pay off a sextortion threatener and takes on a job as a housekeeper at a villa, unaware that it belongs to his former lover, Isai. Isai tests Honest's potential as a housekeeper through her maid, Jothi, and although he fails, Isai hires him as her househelp. Honest uses the advance payment to settle the sextortion debt, but deceives his family, claiming he landed a job at an IT company. Honest's unintentional involvement in Isai's official meeting leads to embarrassment, prompting Isai to humiliate him in front of their college friends by revealing his true occupation as her house helper. Isai also slaps Honest, but soon she understands that his actions were unintentional and regrets slapping him.

Honest and his family embark on a journey to meet his prospective bride, Priya. However, their autorickshaw runs out of fuel and breaks down near Isai's villa. Isai offers them a ride to Priya's house. Honest likes Priya and Isai relieves him of his househelp duties to enable him to secure a better job. However, Honest continues working as Isai's househelp until his marriage is confirmed. Isai grows closer to Honest and his family, and she also discovers that Honest secretly provided her with food during her last semester of college, when her parents were abroad. Touched by Honest's care, Isai accepts him as her best friend and also mentions that she is going to love someone, but Honest misinterprets this as a romantic confession. Consequently, Honest calls off his engagement to Priya, while Isai starts dating her colleague Harish and eventually falls in love with him. Advised by Roman, Honest behaves like a perfect gentleman, leading Isai to believe that he only considers her a friend.

Isai trains Honest and secures him a job at her company. However, her growing closeness to Honest irritates Harish. Honest assumes that Harish and Isai are just friends, while Harish advises her to distance herself from Honest, suggesting that he might become possessive and propose to her. Days later, Isai invites Honest to her home, leading him to believe that she is finally ready to accept him romantically. At her residence, Honest is shocked when he realizes that Isai has merely friendzoned him. Heartbroken, Honest attempts to jump into the ocean but is rescued by Roman. From the next day onward, Honest becomes determined to win Isai's heart. However, his efforts are met with resistance from Harish and his friends, who physically assault him. Honest retaliates with the help of his gang, leading to a violent confrontation between the two groups. At the police station, Isai intervenes, warning Honest to back off while refusing to file a complaint against him, citing pity as her reason. Honest's parents grow concerned about him and after a conversation with his sister, Sangeetha, Honest realizes that he should have respected Isai's boundaries and not pursued her despite her rejection. He begins to distance himself from Isai.

Isai, meanwhile, discovers that Harish has been hiding his live-in relationship with Deepthi, leading to an argument between them. Isai begins to realize that she has misjudged Honest's intentions and failed to recognize his genuine love. Chokkalingam, Honest's father, encourages his son to move on, while Isai's father advises her to accept things as they are. Honest puts efforts to eventually bring a smile back to his mother, Kalyani's face, while Isai breaks up with Harish due to their differences. Isai resolves to confess her love to Honest but discovers that he is leaving for Singapore soon so she decides not to stop him. Six months later, in Chennai, Honest is running a housekeeping agency with his friends. Isai now decides to take a chance with Honest and proposes to him and they finally unite.

== Cast ==
- Hari Bhaskar as Honest Raj
- Losliya Mariyanesan as Isai
- Rayan as Harish
- Ilavarasu as Chokkalingam, Honest and Sangeetha's father
- Jawahar Sakthi as "Jeba kumar" Honest's friend
- Shah Ra as Raman "Roman", Honest's friend
- Uma Ramachandran as Kalyani, Honest and Sangeetha's mother
- M. J. Shriram as Isai's father
- Nithin Manohar
- Bava Lakshmanan as Priya's father
- Hello Kandasamy as a watchman
- Mahima as Sangeetha, Honest's sister
- VJ Ashiq as Gokul, Isai's friend
- KPY Sarath as Honest's gang member
- Ashvin Raja as Honest's gang member
- Lakshmi Priya
- Harii Muniyappan as Thillai, Honest's friend
- Gaayathri Krishnan as Jothi, Isai's maid
- Mageshwaran as Akash, a colleague

== Production ==
On 12 July 2024, it was announced that YouTuber Hari Bhaskar is set to debut as the male lead in his upcoming film titled Mr. Housekeeping, written and directed by Arun Ravichandran. Bigg Boss fame Losliya Mariyanesan, who was last seen in Koogle Kuttappa (2022) was cast as the female lead. The film is produced by N Ramasamy and Nithin Manohar and presented by Sri Thenandal Films and Invate Media. The film has cinematography done by Kulothungavarman R, editing by Rama Subbu and music by Osho Venkat.

On 19 September 2024, it was announced that the entire filming has been completed.

== Music ==
Mr. Housekeeping

Soundtrack album by Osho Venkat
- Released: January 23, 2025
- Genre: Feature film soundtrack
- Length: 19:49
- Language: Tamil
- Label: Sony Music
- Producer: Osho Venkat

Osho Venkat chronology
Mr. Housekeeping (2025)	Love Oh Love (2026)

Singles from Mr. Housekeeping
- 1. "Boy Bestie" Released: 25 October 2024

The soundtrack is composed by Osho Venkat. The first single "Boy Bestie" released on 25 October 2024.

External audio
- Mr. Housekeeping Audio Jukebox on YouTube

Track listing
No.	Title	Lyrics	Singer(s)	Length
1.	"Vandhutan Vandhutan"	MC Vicky	Osho Venkat, MC Vicky	2:30
2.	"Nee Naan"	Ku Karthik	Armaan Malik	3:32
3.	"Closer Than Ever"	Ku Karthik	Amala Chebolu, Krishna Lasya Muthyala	3:05
4.	"Boy Bestie"	Ridhun Sagar	Osho Venkat	3:20
5.	"Anbe Anbe"	Ridhun Sagar	Osho Venkat	3:08
6.	"Nee Naan (Reprise)"	Ku Karthik	Armaan Malik, Osho Venkat	1:17
7.	"Bayamariyaa Boys"	Arun Ravichandran	Osho Venkat, Aditi Bhavaraju, Krishna Lasya Muthyala, Manju Sri Mutyam, K. Pranati	2:57
Total length:				19:49

== Release ==
Mr. Housekeeping released in theatres on 24 January 2025.

== Reception ==
Thinkal Menon of The Times of India gave 2.5/5 stars and wrote "Though Mr House Keeping has some decent twists and turns, the predictability in the third act is a letdown. The conflict between the leading lady and her fiancé deserves an even more strong reason." Sreejith Mullappilly of Cinema Express gave 2.5/5 stars and wrote "Mr Housekeeping works as a decent entertainer, with Hari Baskar and Losliya delivering performances that make us care for their characters throughout.[...] While it does not break new ground in terms of plot or narrative, how the film sets up Honest’s character and his equation with Isai keep it from being too easily predictable." A critic from Dinamalar gave the film 2.5/5 stars, considering that it had potential but was held back by a subpar screenplay, and suggested that a well-written script could have made the film more effective.
