= Losliya Mariyanesan =

Sri Lankan actress, news reader, television presenter (born 1996)

- Born: 23 March 1996 (age 30); Kilinochchi, Northern Province, Sri Lanka
- Education: St. Mary's College, Trincomalee
- Occupations: actress, news reader, television presenter

Losliya Mariyanesan (Tamil: லாஸ்லியா மரியனேசன், romanized: Lāsliyā Mariyaṉēcaṉ; born 23 March 1996) is a Sri Lankan-Indian actress, news reader, television presenter. In 2019, she participated in the reality show Bigg Boss 3 and emerged as the 2nd runner-up.

== Biography ==
Losliya was born on 23 March 1996 in Kilinochchi, Northern Province of Sri Lanka in a typical orthodox Tamil Christian family. Both her parents hailed from the Jaffna District. Due to the uncertainties pertaining to the Eelam War, her family relocated to Trincomalee, Eastern Province of Sri Lanka. Her parents apparently built a small hut made out of thatching in a small village called Anbuvelippuram in Trincomalee, as their hopes faded due to the budget constraints and other difficulties. Her father Mariyanesan in around 2009 decided to pursue greener pastures with the advent of expecting better employment opportunities by travelling to Canada in order to uplift his family who had been deprived of basic needs due to being poverty stricken and he had stayed in Canada for over 10 years in order to look after his family and to cope up with the cost of living. Losliya along with her two sisters attended the St. Mary's College, Trincomalee to pursue primary and secondary education amid severe difficulties. Losliya was a bright student during her schooling years, as she volunteered and took part in extra-curricular activities, in addition to the academics and she honed her skills and talents by participating in Tamil cultural events, Tamil literary competitions and Tamil debates at school level.

Her father S. Mariyanesan died in Canada on 15 November 2020 due to cardiac arrest.

== Career ==
She initially joined the Capital Maharaja Organisation and began working as a television presenter by hosting television programmes which were broadcast in Shakthi TV. She joined Shakthi TV at the age of 18 in around 2015, at a time when she had been waiting for her GCE Advanced Level Examination results to be announced. However, she had faced a major dilemma in the form of an opportunity cost over whether to stick with her mainstream media career aspirations or enter the state university. Losliya made a sacrifice by forgoing the fortune of gaining free education in the form of college entrance and instead she made a gamble by sticking with the media career.

She also became a news reader by joining the News First unit affiliated with the Capital Maharaja Organisation. She spent a duration approximately four years with the production team of Shakthi TV during her initial phase of her career especially when she concentrated in hosting reality shows as an anchor and reading news as a news reader. During her stint at Shakthi TV, she hosted Good Morning Sri Lanka, a morning talk show from 2015 to 2018 and from 2018 to 2019, she plied her trade as a newsreader in News First. In 2019, she quit Shakthi TV and made a decision to enter the Indian Tamil television reality show Bigg Boss and she received the opportunity to enter the Star Vijay's Bigg Boss season 3. It was only in 2019 that she made her maiden visit to the Indian offshore and she revealed within first three months since her arrival to India, she landed a role by getting an offer from the production unit of Bigg Boss to be roped in as one of the contestants of the show. She appeared to have faced an impromptu face-to-face interview before finalising the offer to enter into the Bigg Boss house. She became popular after taking part in the Bigg Boss, where she emerged as the 2nd runnerup of season 3 and she occupied the Bigg Boss house for 105 days. She also gained sympathy from the audience, especially considering the fact that she hailed from the minority Tamil community in Sri Lanka which faced the brunt of the Sri Lankan civil war and she was also praised for her pleasant positive attitude which she displayed throughout the season. However, she also received criticism and bashing from a set of audience after having developed a romantic interest with her fellow contestant Kavin, which also eventually prompted skyrocketing television rating points of Star Vijay and Bigg Boss show. Prior to her participation in the Bigg Boss contest in 2019, she was largely unknown in mainstream media in the context of Tamil Nadu, as she was a known face only in Sri Lanka among the Sri Lankan audience. In 2020, she acted in a television commercial advertisement alongside Ashwin Kumar Lakshmikanthan for the marketing purposes by promoting Blesso branded beauty soap which was a flagship brand of the Aachi Group.

It was after her breakthrough season in Bigg Boss, that she garnered several film acting offers. She revealed that her lack of camera fear through the routine work of being a television host and news reader during the early phase of her career had eventually helped her to ease the burden and pressure of acting in big budgeted films, especially when she got the film acting offers one after the other in the pipeline. She made her film acting debut with John Paul Raj and Sham Surya's joint collaborative directorial venture Friendship (2021), a remake of the Malayalam-language film Queen, where she shared screenspace with the likes of former Indian cricketer Harbhajan Singh and Arjun. She was signed on to play the lead role opposite Harbhajan Singh in Friendship. Her second film appearance came in Koogle Kuttappa (2022), where she played one of the main leads and shared screenspace with K. S. Ravikumar and fellow Sri Lankan actor Tharshan and it was a remake of the Malayalam-language film Android Kunjappan Version 5.25. Her third film appearance came in Mr. Housekeeping (2025), where she was cast in the lead role opposite Hari Bhaskar.

== Filmography ==
=== Films ===
Year	Title	Role	Notes
2021	Friendship	Anitha	
2022	Koogle Kuttappa	Tharani	
2025	Mr. Housekeeping	Isai	
2025	Gentlewoman	Anna	

=== Television ===
Year	Title	Role	Channel	Notes
2015-2018	Good Morning Sri Lanka	Newsreader	Shakthi TV	
2018-2019	News First	Newsreader	News First	
2019	Bigg Boss season 3	Contestant	Star Vijay	2nd runner-up
2025	Bigg Boss (Tamil TV series) season 8	Guest	Star Vijay	As part of Mr. Housekeeping promotions

=== Music videos ===
Year	Title	Music	Vocals	Notes	Ref.
2022	"Baby Nee Sugar"	Osho Venkat	Osho Venkat		

== See also ==
- Portrayals of Sri Lankan Tamils in Indian cinema
- Bigg Boss
