= Kannamma (film) =

- Poster
- Directed by: S. S. Baba Vikram
- Screenplay by: M. Karunanidhi
- Story by: S. S. Baba Vikram
- Produced by: S. S. Baba Vikram
- Starring: Meena; Prem Kumar; Bose Venkat
- Cinematography: C. M. Muthu
- Edited by: Vikram Raja
- Music by: S. A. Rajkumar
- Production company: Baba Cine Films
- Release date: 4 February 2005
- Country: India
- Language: Tamil

Kannamma is a 2005 Indian Tamil language film directed by S. S. Baba Vikram, starring Meena as the titular character along with Prem Kumar and Bose Venkat. The script was written by M. Karunanidhi.

== Plot ==
The story is that of a rich medical student named Kannamma, who falls in love with Anandan after he saves her from an acid attack by her driver Babu. Anand's friend Madan becomes Kannamma's ever-vigilant sentinel, risking his own marriage with Mala. Kannamma learns of Anand's martyrdom through TV. Her baby is disputed, and she is brought before a village council.

== Cast ==
- Meena as Kannamma
- Prem Kumar as Anandan
- Bose Venkat as Madan
- Vindhya as Mala
- Karate Raja as Babu
- Vadivukkarasi
- Vaiyapuri
- Kuyili
- Chandrasekhar

== Production ==
The film marked the comeback of M. Karunanidhi to films as a screenwriter after Puthiya Parasakthi (1996). The film was launched at AVM Studios in 2004 with Radhika Sarathkumar lighting the lamp. Abitha was initially considered for the lead role before Meena took over. Filming began in October 2004.

== Soundtrack ==
Music was composed by S. A. Rajkumar and released on Star Music.

Track listing
No.	Title	Lyrics	Singer(s)	Length
1.	"Kaikodu Kaikodu"	Vairamuthu	Mathangi Jagdish, Srinivas	4:46
2.	"Ennai Ethanai"	Vaali	Pop Shalini, Tippu	4:33
3.	"Ilaignane Ilaignane"	Karunanidhi	Manikka Vinayagam	3:23
4.	"Kichu Kichu"	Vaali	Anuradha Sriram	3:59
5.	"Aalamara Kilaiyinilae"	Baba Vikram	Swarnalatha	5:03
6.	"Iru Vizhi Mazhai"	Karunanidhi	Vani Jairam	5:49
Total length:				27:33

== Reception ==
Rediff.com wrote that "It is quite obvious that the director has not updated himself on how films are made today, in 2005. This film may have worked if it were made in the early 1960s". Sify wrote "So much was expected out of the film but sadly this amateurish attempt of director SS Baba Vikram made the film look like a B grade ‘masala’ flick with item numbers devoid of any cinematic qualities. DMK cadres are sure to be disappointed that there are not enough punchline dialogues and the film is too dry and dull to absorb for nearly 150 minutes".

Malini Mannath of Chennai Online wrote, "It's amteurish [sic] work from scene one to the last scene, with hardly anything commendable about it. But one has to accept that here at least Kalaignar Karunanidhi's script and dialogue and Baba's narration move in tandem, matching perfectly well as the story moves through it's [sic] dreary journey!". Malathi Rangarajan of The Hindu wrote, "FOR THOSE who savour M. Karunanidhi's proficiency in the Tamil language, as evinced in his dialogue for films for more than five decades now, Baba Cine Films' "Kalaignarin Kannamma," (U), directed by Baba Vikram should prove a nostalgic trip. The play on words, imagery and alliterations that fall in place so spontaneously are a treat for the philologist". The film bombed at the box-office.
