= Sudhangan =

Indian journalist, reporter, editor, television presenter, columnist and actor

- Born: Rangarajan; 1958; Thirunelveli, Thamirabharani, Tamil Nadu, India
- Died: 12 September 2020 (aged 61–62)
- Occupations: journalist, reporter, television presenter, columnist and actor
- Years active: 1978–2019
- Known for: investigative journalism
- Notable work: Suttachu Suttachu
- Spouse: Shanthi rangarajan
- Children: aakash rangarajan

Sudhangan born Rangarajan (4 October 1958 – 12 September 2020) was an Indian Tamil journalist, reporter, editor, television presenter, columnist, political analyst and actor who also acted in few films and television soap operas. He was regarded as a pillar of investigative journalism in Tamil media and was well known for his publications based on Tamil cinema and politics. He had also published short stories and a novel. He was also well known for close links with prominent politicians of Tamil Nadu including late Jayalalithaa.

== Career ==
He pursued an interest in reading and writing reports at his young age. He pursued his early career as a reporter for Tamil weekly Thisaikal in 1978. After working for about six months with Thisaikal, he joined the Kumudam magazine as a freelance reporter. He eventually had to change his birth name of Rangarajan to Sudhangan soon after joining the Kumudam group in order to avoid naming confusions with another Kumudam editor Ra. Ki. Rangarajan who had already achieved success in the journalism.

He then left the Kumudam magazine and joined the Vikatan group in 1982. He joined the Junior Vikatan as an editor and he literally introduced new reporting methods and techniques especially paving way for investigative journalism. He also became the chief editor of the magazine and served in the position until 1992. He also later joined the Tamil weeklies Dinamani and Tamilan Express.

His popular book titled Suttachu Suttachu became a bestseller in Tamil Nadu which depicted about the creative differences and dispute between veteran actors M. G. Ramachandran and M. R. Radha. Sudhangan initially published the work as an editorial publication for Dinamani based on the failed assassination attempt of MGR in January 1967. The work was later adapted as a book titled Suttachu Suttachu.

Sudhangan then joined the television industry producing and presenting television shows. He joined the Star Vijay in 1996 initially as a political analyst for a political reality television program. He later joined Minbimbangal of late veteran film director K. Balachandar and hosted programmes related to parliamentary elections. He also joined Jaya TV in 2001 and worked as a television presenter with the channel until 2005.

He was also critical of modern depiction of journalism in media and films stating that the modern day journalism in Tamil Nadu is unable to convey a precise and clear message to the society. He won The Statesman Award in Kolkata for his outstanding achievements in the field of journalism. To date, he is the only South Indian journalist to have received the award.

== Death ==
Sudhangan died of a lung ailment on 12 September 2020 at the age of 63.

== Filmography ==
- Anthimanthaarai (1996)
- Kaatrukkenna Veli (2001)
