= Lightman (film) =

2017 Indian film by Kumar G. Venkatesh

- Release poster
- Directed by: Kumar G. Venkatesh
- Written by: Kumar G. Venkatesh
- Produced by: Kumar G. Venkatesh
- Starring: Karthik Nag
- Cinematography: Rahul Rajkumar
- Edited by: Kamalthasan
- Music by: Tony Britto
- Production company: Studio18
- Release date: 10 February 2017
- Country: India
- Language: Tamil

Lightman is a 2017 Indian Tamil-language film, written, produced and directed by Kumar G. Venkatesh. The film portrays the life of lightmen in cinema, portrayed by Karthik Nag.

== Cast ==
- Karthik Nag as Guna
- Jennifer as Chitra
- Govinda Swaminathan

== Release ==
The film was leaked on Tamilrockers a day before its release to the dismay of actor Karthik Nag.

== Reception ==
Baradwaj Rangan wrote that "We wouldn’t be able to see our favourite stars if lightmen weren’t around to illuminate them, and yet, these lightmen remain invisible. With this film, they finally step into the limelight". A critic from Maalai Malar wrote that "All in all, 'Lightman' is a light for screen artists". A critic from The Times of India Samayam wrote that the film is "too much 'heavyweight' and 'heavy dose', which are the film's disadvantages".
