= Bose Venkat =

Indian actor and director

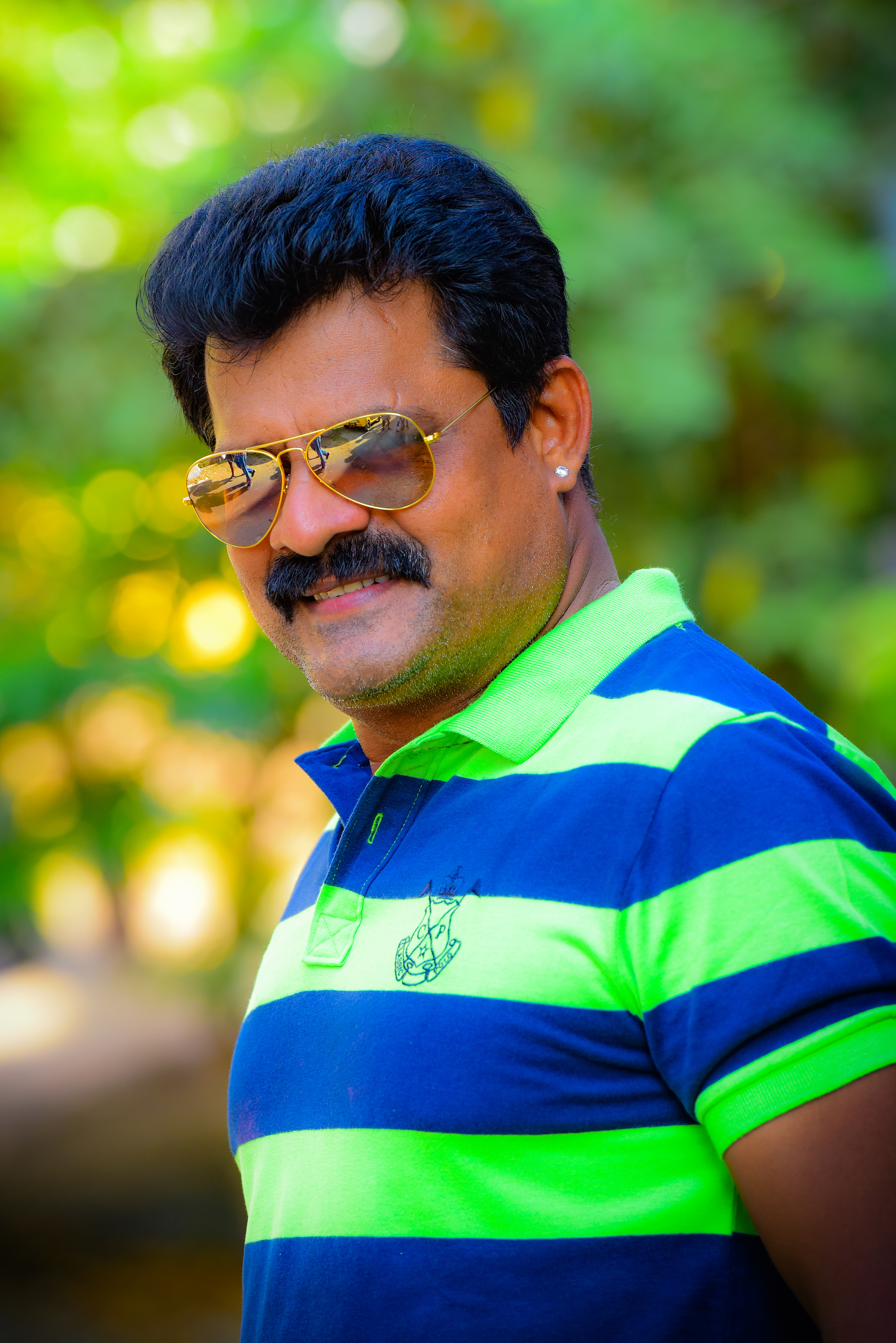
- Born: Venkatesan; 4 February 1976 (age 50); Aranthangi, Pudukkottai, Tamil Nadu, India
- Occupations: Actor, film director
- Years active: 2003–present
- Political party: Dravida Munnetra Kazhagam
- Spouse: Sonia (m. 2003)
- Children: 2

Bose Venkat (born 4 February 1976) is an Indian Politician,actor, director and dubbing artist who appears in Tamil films and television serials.

== Personal life ==
Venkat married actress Sonia in 2003.

== Career ==
Venkat came to Chennai at the age of 17, hoping to become an actor in films. After facing an unsuccessful start to his career, he worked briefly as an auto rickshaw driver while attending auditions. He was subsequently selected for a role in the serial Metti Oli. Recognising his work in the serial, director Bharathiraja offered him a role in Eera Nilam (2003). He was also part of the 2005 Tamil film, Kannamma under the direction of S. S. Baba Vikram. He has also acted in a few Malayalam films alongside Mammootty and Dileep.

He says his best experience was acting with Superstar Rajinikanth in the Tamil action film film, Sivaji under the direction of S. Shankar in 2007. Although he played a negative role alongside Suman, his performance was showered with praises from all over. Bose has appeared in pivotal roles in films such as Marudhamalai (2007), Dhaam Dhoom (2008), Saroja (2008), Singam (2010), Ko (2011), Yaamirukka Bayamey (2014), 36 Vayadhinile (2015), Kavan (2017) and Theeran Adhigaram Ondru (2017).

He made his debut as a director with Kanni Maadam (2020). Bose Venkat made a comeback as a director with the latest social reform drama Sir (2024), which stars Vimal and Saravanan in the lead roles.

== Awards ==
- 2006: Received title of Kalaimamani Award by the Government of Tamil Nadu, which is the highest state honour in the field of Arts.

== Filmography ==
=== Actor ===
==== Tamil films ====
Year	Film	Role	Notes
2003	Eera Nilam	Kalanjiyam	
2003	Sindhamal Sitharamal	Janaki's brother	
2004	Arasatchi	Police Inspector	
2005	Kannamma	Madhan	
2005	Rightaa Thappaa		
2006	Thalai Nagaram	Balu	
2006	Naalai		
2007	Deepavali	Kempaiah Shetty	
2007	Rasigar Mandram	Lorry Driver	
2007	Sivaji	Velu	
2007	Marudhamalai		
2007	Rameswaram	Saravanan	
2008	Vedha	ACP S. Veera Pandi	
2008	Pathu Pathu	Venkat	
2008	Dhaam Dhoom	Shenba's uncle	
2008	Saroja	R. Venkatraman	
2008	Suryaa		
2009	Rajadhi Raja	Pandian	
2010	Rasikkum Seemane		
2010	Sivappu Mazhai	Ramana	
2010	Singam	Ravi	
2010	Aaravadhu Vanam	Dharma	
2010	Nagaram Marupakkam	Sakkara Pandi	
2011	Ponnar Shankar	Veerannan	
2011	Ko	Kadhir	
2011	Pillaiyar Theru Kadaisi Veedu	Durai	
2011	Sadhurangam	Sekhar	
2012	Palayamkottai	Paramesh	
2012	Kai	Kailash a.k.a. Kai	
2012	Kozhi Koovuthu	Ayyanar	
2014	Tenaliraman	Kaaliappa	
2014	Yaamirukka Bayamey	Arunachalam	
2014	Vallavanukku Pullum Aayudham	Rathnavel	
2014	Aindhaam Thalaimurai Sidha Vaidhiya Sigamani	Trust Manager	
2014	Yaan	Haridas	
2014	Jaihind 2	Ramnath	Multilingual film
2014	Vilaasam		
2014	Vanmam	Palraj	
2014	Vingyani		
2015	Vettaiyadu		
2015	Sagaptham	Cruel Money lender	
2015	Vai Raja Vai	Velraj	
2015	36 Vayadhinile	K. Satish Kumar	
2015	Eli	Karunakaran	
2015	Yagavarayinum Naa Kaakka	Khan	Bilingual film
2015	Chandi Veeran	Paari's father	
2015	Thakka Thakka	Kaasi	
2015	Paranjothi		
2015	Sivappu	Policeman	
2016	Aarathu Sinam	Viswanathan	
2016	Thodari	Assistant train driver	
2017	Kavan	Dheeran Maniarasu / Theechadhi Mannaaru	
2017	Theeran Adhigaram Ondru	Sathya	
2018	Kadal Kuthiraigal	Sathya	
2018	Moonavathu Kann		
2018	Jarugandi	Police Officer	
2019	Kuttram Seiyel	Naaga	Malaysian Tamil film
2019	Agni Devi	Charles	
2019	Devarattam	Vetri's 1st brother-in-law	
2019	Dharmaprabhu	Minister	
2019	Thavam		
2019	Panam Kaaikkum Maram		
2021	Kaadan	Divisional Forest Officer	Multilingual film
2021	Writer	Tiruverumbur Inspector	
2022	Saayam		
2022	Maaran	Pazhani's Assistant	
2022	Taanakkaran	Inspector Mathi	
2022	Yaanai	Sivachandran	
2023	Kodai	Venkat	
2023	Ayothi	Chithirai Pandian	
2023	August 16 1947		
2023	Kulasami		
2023	Baba Black Sheep		
2023	Nandhi Varman		
2023	Veeran	Sharath	
2024	Yaavarum Vallavare		
2024	Saamaniyan	Bank Manager Adhithyan	
2024	Sevakar		
2024	Kanguva	Miyasan	
2024	Viduthalai Part 2	Landlord	
2025	Poorveegam		
2025	DNA	Moorthy	
2025	Thanal	K. Ramakrishnan	
2025	Diesel	Minister Thirumalai	
2025	Indian Penal Law	Muthukaruppan	
2026	Chellamada Nee Enakku		
2026	Double Occupancy	Rajni’s Father	
2026	Ananthan Kaadu	Thirupaachi	Bilingual Film
2026	Lenin Pandiyan		

==== Malayalam films ====
Year	Film	Role	Notes
2006	Lion	Gangster	
2007	Panthaya Kozhi	Alex Antony	
2008	Annan Thambi	Circle Inspector Anbuarasan	
2008	Kabadi Kabadi	CI Yatheendran	
2008	One Way Ticket	Sasi's henchman	
2009	Colours	Stephen	
2009	Dr. Patient		
2026	Ananthan Kaadu	Thirupaachi	Bilingual Film

==== Kannada films ====
Year	Film	Role	Notes
2012	Nandeesha		
2014	Abhimanyu	Ramnath	Multilingual film
2016	Deal Raja		

==== Telugu films ====
Year	Film	Role	Notes
2014	Jaihind 2	Ramnath	Multilingual film
2016	Malupu	Khan	Bilingual film
2021	Aranya	Divisional Forest Officer	Multilingual film

=== Director ===
Year	Film	Notes	Ref.
2020	Kanni Maadam		
2024	Sir	Presented by Vetrimaaran	

=== Voice actor ===
Year	Film	Actor	Language
2014	Veeram	Atul Kulkarni	Tamil
2015	Yennai Arindhaal	Ashish Vidyarthi	Tamil
2016	Killing Veerappan	Sandeep Bharadwaj	Tamil (dubbed)
2017	Vizhithiru	Nagendra Babu	Tamil
2020	Vaikunthapuram	Samuthirakani	Tamil (dubbed)
2022	Acharya	Chiranjeevi	Tamil (dubbed)
2022	The Warriorr	Lal	Tamil
2023	Veera Simha Reddy	Duniya Vijay	Tamil (dubbed)
2026	Drishyam 3	Biju Menon	Tamil (dubbed)
2026	Kattalan	Sunil	Malayalam & Tamil (dubbed)

=== Television ===
Year	Title	Role	Channel
2002-2005	Metti Oli	Bose	Sun TV
2006-2008	Lakshmi		Sun TV
2005-2006	Selvi	Niranjan	Sun TV
2006	Auto Shankar		Makkal TV
2007	Arasi	Niranjan	Sun TV
2008	Simran Thirai		Jaya TV
2013	Mahabharatham	Pandu	Sun TV
2014	Mudivalla Arambam	Karunakaran	Vendhar TV
2020	Kannamoochi	Loudersamy	ZEE5
2022	Kuthukku Pathu		Aha Tamil
2024	Heart Beat	Vinisha's father	Disney+ Hotstar
2026	Brothers and Sisters	Shanmuga Sundaram "SS"	JioHotstar
