= Kanni Maadam =

2020 Indian Tamil-language romantic drama film directed by Bose Venkat

- Theatrical release poster
- Directed by: Bose Venkat
- Written by: Bose Venkat
- Produced by: Muhammed Hasheer
- Starring: Sriram Karthik; Chaya Devi; Vishnu
- Cinematography: Iniyan J. Harish
- Edited by: Rizaal Jainy
- Music by: Hari Sai
- Production company: Rooby Films
- Release date: 21 February 2020
- Running time: 132 minutes
- Country: India
- Language: Tamil

Kanni Maadam is a 2020 Indian Tamil-language romantic drama film directed by Bose Venkat in his directorial debut. The film stars newcomers Sriram Karthik, Chaya Devi and Vishnu. The film received mixed to positive reviews from critics.

== Cast ==
- Sriram Karthik as Anbu
- Chaya Devi as Malar
- Aadukalam Murugadoss as Shankar
- Vishnu Ramasamy as Kathir
- Mime Gopi as Inspector Paramasivam
- Valeena Princes as Auto Driver
- Priyanka Robo Shankar as Landlady
- Gajaraj as Anbu's father
- Ananthraj
- Rindhu Ravi
- Hello Kandasamy
- Supergood Subramani as an aspiring actor

== Production ==
Principal photography commenced on 18 February 2019 and ended on 16 May 2019.

== Soundtrack ==
Several celebrities attended the audio launch including Vijay Sethupathi, Bharath, Samuthirakani, Vikraman, Harish Kalyan, Gayathrie.

Newcomer Hari Sai composed the film's songs. Robo Shankar made his singing debut in the film.

- "Oyadha Megam" – Shweta Mohan
- "Moonu Kaalu Vaaganam" – Robo Shankar
- "Oru Veedu" – Vijay Yesudas
- "Andarathil Thongudhaiya" – Anthony Daasan
- "Thee Pidithu" – Arvind Mukundan, Priyanka NK
- "Yen Devan" – Sirisha
- "Villu Paatu" – Hari Sai

== Release and reception ==
Kaani Maadam was released on 21 February 2020. The Times of India gave the film two out of five stars and wrote that "However, it is the overdose of melodrama which lets the film down. The lacklustre screenplay doesn’t engage after a point". Similarly, The Deccan Chronicle gave the film two-and-a-half out of five stars and stated that " Had the director concentrated on a better screenplay, the film would have had a bigger impact" while praising the performances of the cast.

== Accolades ==
Year	Award	Category	Nominee	Result	Ref.
2020	Toronto Tamil Film Festival	Audience Award for Best Feature film	Kanni Maadam	Won	
2021	South Indian International Movie Awards	SIIMA Award for Best Debut Actor – Tamil	Kanni Maadam	Won	
2021	South Indian International Movie Awards	SIIMA Award for Best Debut Actress – Tamil	Kanni Maadam	Nominated	
2021	South Indian International Movie Awards	SIIMA Award for Best Debut Producer – Tamil	Kanni Maadam	Nominated	

- Screening Chennai International Film Festival 2020
