= Lijomol Jose =

Indian actress

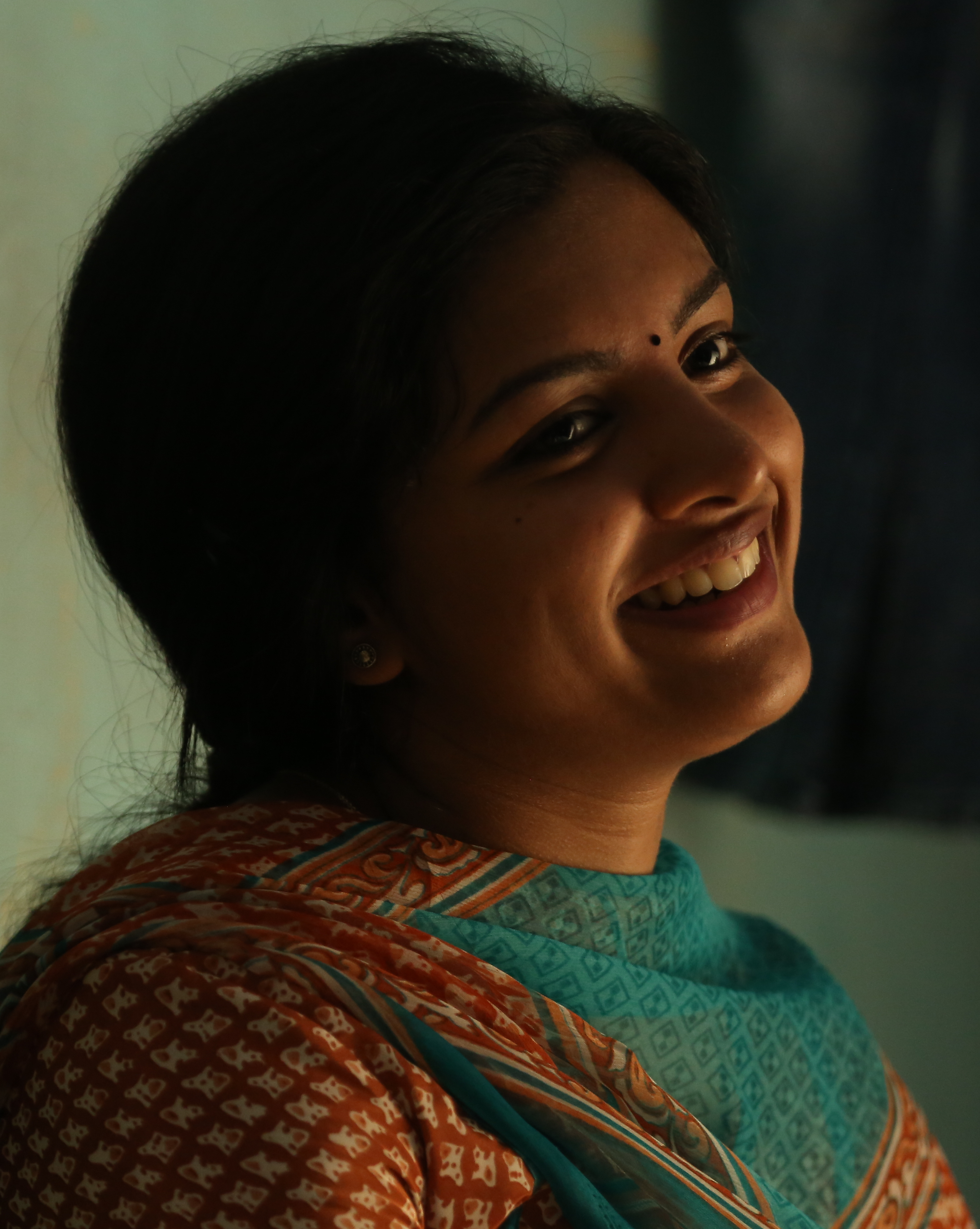
- Lijomol in 2018
- Born: Idukki, Kerala, India
- Education: Pondicherry University
- Occupation: Actress
- Years active: 2016–present
- Spouse: Arun Antony Onisseril (m. 2021)

Lijomol Jose is an Indian actress who primarily appears in Malayalam and Tamil films. She earned critical acclaim for her role in the Tamil film Jai Bhim (2021), which won her the Filmfare Award for Best Actress – Tamil.

== Career ==
Lijomol made her acting debut in the highly acclaimed Malayalam film, Maheshinte Prathikaaram in 2016. She then played the second female lead in the commercially successful film Kattappanayile Rithwik Roshan in the same year. In her third film, Honey Bee 2.5 (2017), she played the role of a personal make-up artist of actress Bhavana. She then starred in Street Lights (2018) with Mammootty before making her Tamil cinema debut with Sivappu Manjal Pachai (2019) opposite Siddharth. She was critically acclaimed for portraying the anguish of a primitive Irular tribe, Senggeni in Jai Bhim, co-starring actor Suriya. In 2024, she had three releases in year: Nadanna Sambhavam, I Am Kathalan and Her (all are Malayalam films). She played the lead role in the Tamil film, Gentlewoman (2025).

== Personal life ==
Lijomol hails from Peermade, Idukki, Kerala. She completed her MSc in information and library science from Pondicherry University. She married Arun Antony Onisseril on 4 October 2021, in Wayanad, Kerala.

== Filmography ==
Key
†	Denotes films that have not yet been released

Year	Title	Role(s)	Language	Notes	Ref.
2016	Maheshinte Prathikaaram	Soniya	Malayalam	Malayalam debut	
2016	Kattappanayile Rithwik Roshan	Kani	Malayalam		
2017	Honey Bee 2.5	Kanmani	Malayalam		
2018	Street Lights	Ramya	Malayalam	Shot in Tamil also	
2018	Premasoothram	Ammukutty	Malayalam		
2018	Ottakoru Kaamukan	Kathrina	Malayalam		
2019	Sivappu Manjal Pachai	Rajalakshmi "Raji"	Tamil	Tamil debut	
2021	Theethum Nandrum	Thamizh	Tamil		
2021	Jai Bhim	Senggeni	Tamil		
2022	Putham Pudhu Kaalai Vidiyaadhaa	Nallathangaal	Tamil	Amazon Prime anthology film Segment : Loners	
2022	Visudha Mejo	Jeena	Malayalam		
2023	Ayalvaashi	Kuttimalu	Malayalam		
2023	Pulimada	CPO Sini	Malayalam		
2024	Nadanna Sambhavam	Dhanya	Malayalam		
2024	I Am Kathalan	Simi	Malayalam		
2024	Her	Abhinaya	Malayalam	ManoramaMAX anthology film	
2025	Ponman	Steffi	Malayalam		
2025	Kaadhal Enbadhu Podhu Udamai	Sam	Tamil		
2025	Daveed	Sherin	Malayalam	ZEE5 action film	
2025	Gentlewoman	Poorni	Tamil		
2025	Samshayam	Vimala	Malayalam		
2026	Baby Girl	Rithu	Malayalam		
2026	Nooru Saami	Angela Sister	Tamil		
2026	Unmadham	Sowmya	Malayalam		
2026	Baththa	Kannima	Tamil		
TBA	Freedom †	Selvi	Tamil		

=== Web series ===
Year	Title	Role	Channel	Language
2026	Blind Fold †	TBA	Sony LIV	Malayalam

== Awards and nominations ==
Year	Award	Category	Film	Result	Ref.
2020	Ananda Vikatan Cinema Awards	Best Debut Actress	Sivappu Manjal Pachai	Won	
2022	Critics Choice India Film Awards	Best Actress	Jai Bhim	Nominated	
2022	Filmfare Awards South	Best Actress – Tamil	Jai Bhim	Won	
2022	JFW Just For Women Movie Awards	Best Actress	Jai Bhim	Won	
2022	Noida Film Festival	Best Actress	Jai Bhim	Won	
2022	Boston International Film Festival	Best Actress	Jai Bhim	Won	
2022	Ananda Vikatan Cinema Awards	Best Actress	Jai Bhim	Won	
2022	Behindwoods Gold Medal	Best Actress	Jai Bhim	Won	
2022	Edison Awards (India)	Best Actress	Jai Bhim	Won	
2025	Mazhavil Entertainment Awards	Best Actress	Ponman	Won	
2025	Kerala State Film Awards	Best Character Actress	Nadanna Sambhavam	Won	
2026	Tamil Nadu State Film Awards	Best Actress	Jai Bhim	Won	
2026	Filmfare Awards South	Best Supporting Actress – Malayalam	Her	Won	
