= Anthimanthaarai =

- DVD cover
- Directed by: Bharathiraja
- Screenplay by: Bharathiraja
- Story by: R. Selvaraj
- Produced by: Chandraleela Bharathiraja; Thilaka Ganesh
- Starring: Vijayakumar; Jayasudha; Sanghavi
- Cinematography: C. Dhanapal
- Edited by: K. Pazhanivel
- Music by: A. R. Rahman
- Production company: Megaa Movies
- Release date: 1 June 1996
- Running time: 131 minutes
- Country: India
- Language: Tamil

Anthimanthaarai (transl. Mirabilis jalapa) is a 1996 Indian Tamil-language historical drama film directed by Bharathiraja. The film stars Vijayakumar and Jayasudha. It is produced by Chandraleela Bharathiraja and Thilaka Ganesh. The film won the National Award for the Best Feature Film in Tamil. The music for the film is scored by A. R. Rahman, marking his third collaboration with Bharathiraja after Kizhakku Cheemayile and Karuthamma.

The film had a brief run lasting for a week in major cinemas and fared poorly at the box office despite its accolades and critical acclaim.

== Plot ==
An aged man Kandaswamy Iyer at his retirement pursues a relationship that he could not experience when younger. He was once a freedom fighter and activist, but as time passes by, his efforts become gradually forgotten. Towards the end of his life, he grapples to financially support himself and loses his respect and identity in society. His desires to lead a peaceful retirement with his companion Thangam is tragically taken away from him by the ungrateful and ignorant community.

== Cast ==
- Vijayakumar as Kandaswamy Iyer
- Jayasudha as Thangam
- Sanghavi as Kandaswamy's nephew’s wife
- Chandrasekhar as the watchman
- Sudhangan as Kandaswamy's nephew
- Kottiswar
- Veera Raghavan
- Kamala Kamesh
- Ra. Sankaran
- Mallaiah

== Production ==
Radhika was initially supposed to star in the film but her busy schedule meant that the role went to Jayasudha.

== Soundtrack ==
The soundtrack of the film was composed by A. R. Rahman and was a promotional audio since the film featured just a few snatches of these songs in the background. It has 4 songs including a Carnatic song written in Sanskrit and 3 instrumental themes. The lyrics were written by Vairamuthu.

Song	Singer(s)
Bharathiraja's Voice I	Bharathiraja
"Sakiyae Nee"	Unnikrishnan
Theme Music I	Instrumental
Bharathiraja's Voice II	Bharathiraja
"Oru Naal Oru Pozhudu"	Swarnalatha
Theme Music II	Instrumental
"Pullai Thinkum"	Sumangali
Music Bit I	Instrumental
Music Bit II	Instrumental

== Reception ==
Kalki called Anthimanthaarai a film lacking trademark elements of Bharathiraja and praised him for narrating the plot within two hours by lessening the dialogues and expressing with small movements and montage shots. D. S. Ramanujam of The Hindu wrote, "The tragic tale of a freedom fighter, a firm believer in old values, gets the deft and poignant Bharathiraaja touches, heightening the value of the character in Mega Movies, Anthimantharai". Anthimanthaarai won the National Award for the Best Feature Film in Tamil. According to Vijayakumar, he was a strong contender for the Best Actor award, but lost by a single vote.
