= Sivappu Mazhai =

- Directed by: V. Krishnamurthy
- Written by: V. Krishnamurthy; V. Prabhakar; Sab John
- Produced by: Suresh Joachim; Andrew Ray Raymond
- Starring: Suresh Joachim; Meera Jasmine
- Cinematography: K. Vishwanathan; M. Jamaldeen
- Edited by: V. T. Vijayan
- Music by: Deva
- Production company: Suresh Joachim Network
- Release date: 9 April 2010
- Country: India
- Language: Tamil

Sivappu Mazhai (English: Red rain) is a 2010 IndianTamil-language action film written and directed by V. Krishnamurthy. Earlier referred to as Guinness Vision, the film was made in 11 days 23 hours 45 minutes, breaking the Guinness World Record. The film features Suresh Joachim and Meera Jasmine while Vivek and Suman play other prominent roles.

== Plot ==
The film revolves around Nandhan (Suresh Joachim), a Sri Lankan Tamil youth who kidnaps Samyukta, (Meera Jasmine), a Minister's daughter and a television journalist.

The Minister (Suman) is helped by the Director General of Police (Rajeev) and his subordinate Ramana (Bose Venkat) to rescue Samyukta. Things take a turn when they get an interesting demand from Nandhan seeking the release of a certain Sri Lankan national detained by the police.

== Cast ==
- Suresh Joachim as Nandan
- Meera Jasmine as Samyukta
- Vivek as Periyasamy a.k.a. Petersamy
- Suman as Minister, Samyukta's father
- Rajeev as DGP
- Bose Venkat as Ramana
- Shruthi Ramakrishnan as Nurse
- T. P. Gajendran
- Alex as Mukundan
- Vijay Krishnaraj
- Pondy Ravi as Lakshman
- Scissor Manohar
- Cell Murugan as Chandy

== Production ==
Suresh Joachim of Canada, along with 1,000 crew, completed the 2 hours, 3 minute movie in 11 days, 23 hours, and 45 minutes. The clock started as soon as the script writer started to write the script. This film was made from 22 May 2009 at 6:30 pm to 3 June 2009 at 6:15 pm. (starting from writing the story, screenplay, composing 4 songs, title, shooting up to 60 scenes and editing it into a two-hour feature-length film).

The film was expected to begin on 13 April and to be completed and released on 26 April 2009 in an attempt to break the current record for the quickest shoot of a feature-length film. The shooting of the film started in Nalla Farm House in Pondicherry on 22 May and continued till 3 June.

== Soundtrack ==
Soundtrack was composed by Deva.

No.	Song	Singers	Lyrics
1	Tamizha Tamizha	S. P. Balasubrahmanyam	Vairamuthu
2	Kanavu Kaankiren	Praveena	Vairamuthu
3	Kadhal Thandi	Haricharan, Chinmayi	Vairamuthu
4	Unarchigalai	Srikanth Deva, Suchitra	Vairamuthu
5	Porkalathil	Suresh Joachim, Vijitha	Vairamuthu

== Critical reception ==
A critic from The New Indian Express wrote, "Sivappu Mazhai may not have the greatest script going. But it’s a commendable effort from a first time maker, working within a time limit." A critic from The Hindu wrote that "Despite the hotchpotch treatment, particularly towards the end, you do notice some method in the making of ‘Sivappu Mazhai". A critic from Indiaglitz called it "a good attempt considering the theme touched by the makers".
