= Ulla Kadathal =

- DVD cover
- Directed by: Pugazhendhi Thangaraj
- Written by: Pugazhendhi Thangaraj; Tamizhmagan (dialogues)
- Produced by: S. Ganesan
- Starring: Vignesh; Yugendran; Kutty Radhika
- Cinematography: Pavan Sekhar
- Edited by: K. Thanigachalam
- Music by: Bharadwaj
- Production company: Hi-Time Movie Makers
- Release date: 18 February 2005
- Running time: 150 minutes
- Country: India
- Language: Tamil

Ulla Kadathal is a 2005 Indian Tamil-language romantic drama film directed by Pugazhendhi Thangaraj. The film stars Vignesh, Yugendran, and Kutty Radhika, with Pandu, Suja Varunee, Priyadarshini and Malaysia Vasudevan playing supporting roles. It was released on 18 February 2005.

== Plot ==
Ramya and her best friend Samyuktha are students in visual communication. Ramya is a soft-spoken woman while Samyuktha is an outspoken and carefree woman. Ramya falls in love with Robert, a freelance photographer who comes to her college for a teaching stint. They begin to meet each other and they fall in love with each other. One day, Robert reveals that he grew up in an orphanage and he is willing to marry her. Ramya's brother Sakthi is overprotective and a stubborn person, Sakthi wants her to marry the man he has chosen for her: a USA-based groom. Ramya tries to convince her parents and brother to let her marry her lover but Sakthi has a low opinion of Robert. Sakthi and her parents then start the marriage preparation.

Robert and Ramya elope with the help of their friends, and get married in a temple. On their first night together, an angry Sakthi finds their place and reveals to his sister that their parents had committed suicide following her elopement. Ramya decides to stay with her brother for a few months, the problem escalates and Sakthi takes this opportunity to fulfil his wish, but her sister-in-law Malar tries to stop it. Later, Ramya becomes pregnant and Sakthi wants her to abort the baby but Ramya refuses. One day, he lies to his sister that they are going to the temple and he tries to bring her to the doctor. Robert comes to her rescue and saves her. During the fight between Sakthi and Robert, Sakthi falls from a building, and they take him to the nearby hospital. Ramya sells her thaali to pay the hospital bills and Sakthi is saved by the doctor. Sakthi finally understands his mistake. Robert and Ramya lived happily ever after.

== Cast ==
- Vignesh as Sakthi
- Yugendran as Robert
- Kutty Radhika as Ramya
- Pandu
- Suja Varunee as Samyuktha
- Priyadarshini as Malar, Sakthi's wife
- Malaysia Vasudevan as Brahim
- Priyanka as Samyuktha's mother
- Suresh as Suresh
- J. P. K. Gokul as Gokul
- Udhay as Ezhil
- Mahendran
- Sathyan
- Elango
- Pramod
- Stalin
- Latha

== Soundtrack ==
The soundtrack was composed by Bharadwaj.

Track listing
No.	Title	Lyrics	Singer(s)	Length
1.	"Kadhal Devan"	Su. Ganesan	Ujjayinee Roy	5:20
2.	"Naana Ithu Naana"	Mu. Metha	K. S. Chithra, Murali Krishna	4:44
3.	"Pattaam Pattaam Poochigal"	Kabilan	Lavanya, Bharadwaj, Sundar, Subiksha, Reshmi	4:22
4.	"Thathi Thathi Thaavum"	Mu. Metha	Reshmi, Deepika	4:42
5.	"Vaanavillai"	Su. Ganesan	Bharadwaj	5:21
6.	"Yaaro Yaaro"	Mu. Metha	Srimathumitha, Sathyan	4:42
Total length:				29:11

== Critical reception ==
Malini Mannath of Chennai Online stated, "The performances are bad, to say the least, particularly Vignesh, normally a competent performer, but who's given one of his worst performances to date here" and criticized the "hasty scripting and shoddy narration".
