= Unakkul Naan =

- Directed by: Kumar G. Venkatesh
- Release date: April 28, 2016 (Norway Film Festival)
- Running time: 100 minutes
- Country: India
- Language: Tamil

Unakkul Naan (transl. I'm within you) is a 2016 Indian Tamil film directed by Venkatesh Kumar G in his feature film debut.

The film had its premiere at the 7th Norway Film Festival 2016 at Oslo, Norway. The film was telecasted on Doordarshan as a children's day special on 14 November 2016. This is an experimental feature film that was shot inside the theatre.

== Plot ==
Unakkul Naan plays out through the mind of a young boy who, while watching a film at the theater where his father works as a projectionist, is sent back to school by his father. The boy then embarks on a fantastical journey wherein he experiences the joy of childhood while also coming to understand the reality of human life and its elements.

== Cast ==
Karthik Nag as Tamil Teacher

== Reception ==
A critic from The Times of India Samayam rated the film two out of five.
