= Her (2024 film) =

Indian anthology film

- Promotional release poster
- Directed by: Lijin Jose
- Written by: Archana Vasudev
- Screenplay by: Archana Vasudev
- Produced by: Anishmon Thomas
- Starring: Urvashi; Parvathy Thiruvothu; Aishwarya Rajesh; Remya Nambeesan; Lijomol Jose
- Cinematography: Chandru Selvaraj
- Edited by: Kiran Das
- Music by: Govind Vasantha
- Production company: AT Studios
- Distributed by: ManoramaMAX
- Release date: 29 November 2024
- Country: India
- Language: Malayalam

Her is a 2024 Malayalam language anthology film directed by Lijin Jose. It stars Urvashi, Parvathy Thiruvothu, Aishwarya Rajesh, Remya Nambeesan, and Lijomol Jose. The film released directly through the OTT platform ManoramaMAX on 29 November 2024.

== Plot ==
The film features stories of five women with different ages and backgrounds, focusing on their personal and professional lives, and how they overcome the everyday issues they face.

== Cast ==
- Urvashi as Shanta Vijayan
- Prathap Pothen as Vijayakumar
- Parvathy Thiruvothu as Ruchi
- Aishwarya Rajesh as Aami
- Remya Nambeesan as Reshma
- Lijomol Jose as Abhinaya
- Rajesh Madhavan as Anil
- Sethu Lakshmi as Saraswati
- Rony David as Satish
- Guru Somasundaram as Auto driver
- Sabumon Abdusamad as Jagannathan
- Dinesh Panicker as Sundaram
- Sreeram Ramachandran as Sanal
- Mala Parvathi as Abhi's mother
- Mamitha Baiju as passenger in Autorickshaw

== Release ==
The film was released digitally to ManoramaMAX OTT platform on 29 November 2024.

== Reception ==
The film mostly received mixed to negative reviews from critics. The Indian Express rated the film 1.5 out of 5 stars and wrote:"Urvashi, Parvathy Thiruvothu and Aishwarya Rajesh's film is insincere and performative". A critic from The Hindu reviewed: "An uneven anthology made worthwhile by a couple of segments". The South First rated 4/5 stars and wrote:" A solid script and stunning performances make this women-centred movie relevant". Cinema Express rated 2 out of 5 stars and wrote: "A disjointed film discussing pertinent yet familiar themes".
