= Kaatrukkenna Veli =

2001 film by Pugazendhi Thangaraj

- Title card
- Directed by: Pugazhendhi Thangaraj
- Written by: Pugazendhi Thangaraj
- Produced by: T. Vellaiyan
- Starring: Sujitha; Sriman
- Cinematography: M. Ashokselva
- Edited by: K. Thanigachalam
- Music by: Ilaiyaraaja
- Production company: Thaai Movie Makers
- Release date: 14 November 2001
- Running time: 145 minutes
- Country: India
- Language: Tamil

Kaatrukkenna Veli (transl. Why does the wind need a fence?) is a 2001 Indian Tamil-language war film directed by Pugazhendhi Thangaraj. The film stars Sujitha and Sriman, with Chandrasekhar, Sudhangan, Sakthi Kumar, Arulmani, Kalairani, Diana and Premi playing supporting roles. It follows an LTTE soldier who takes refuge in Tamil Nadu, evading law enforcement. The film was released on 14 November 2001.

== Plot ==
Manimekalai is a young fighter associated with the Liberation Tigers of Tamil Eelam (LTTE). During a battle in Valvettithurai (northeast coast of Sri Lanka), she is seriously injured in the leg. Her other colleagues take her on a boat and are headed to India. They land in Point Calimere, Tamil Nadu. With the help of an Indian Tamil intermediate, they reach a hospital in Nagapattinam.

The doctor Subhash Chandra Bose initially refuses to treat Manimekalai because it is an illegal matter. After seeing her leg's condition, he finally accepts to operate her but Manimekalai does not want to have her leg amputated. It was a sensitive case, the doctors successfully operate her leg but it is only temporary. Her leg could be at any time collapsed and she could die of it. Subhash does not understand why she risks her life for her leg and she tells him her past.

In the past, Manimekalai was a cheerful and careless girl. After failing a class twice, she left school. One day, the disabled woman Lakshmi had just moved in next door. Lakshmi and Manimekalai became good friends and spent time singing songs. Everything went well until an LTTE soldier got killed by Sri Lanka Army in Lakshmi's home. Thereafter, the army started to threaten them, Manimekalai ran away from the place while Lakshmi stayed there. The same night, Lakshmi set herself on fire. Later, Manimekalai joined the LTTE.

In the present, Subhash promises Manimekalai he will not call the police and he accepts to let her in the hospital ward for a month. The Tamil Nadu police receive very often information letters from the Sri Lankan government and this time it is about the LTTE group staying in a hospital. What transpires later forms the crux of the story.

== Cast ==
- Sujitha as Manimekalai
- Sriman as Dr. Subhash Chandra Bose
- Chandrasekhar as Mohamed Sherif
- Sudhangan as Murali
- Sakthi Kumar as Yoganathan
- Arulmani as Bhagavathi Pandian
- Kalairani as Subhash's mother
- Diana as Shiba
- Premi as Manimekalai's mother
- Ruban George as Police officer
- Khushbu as Lakshmi
- C. Arun Pandian as an LTTE fighter

== Production ==
The filming was completed within 18 days and was funded by about 120 traders.

== Soundtrack ==
The film score and the soundtrack were composed by Ilaiyaraaja, with lyrics written by Subramania Bharati.

Song	Singer(s)	Duration
"Sri Gananatha Sindhoora"	Uma Ramanan, Sunandha	0:33
"Theeradha Vilaiyattu Pillai"	Uma Ramanan, Sunandha	1:05
"Vaarthai Thavari Vittai"	Uma Ramanan	1:28

== Release and reception ==
The film was initially banned by the Central Board of Film Certification because of its sympathetic portrayal of the LTTE, and negative portrayal of Sri Lankan soldiers. Malathi Rangarajan of The Hindu wrote, "The way the story has been dealt with is quite interesting — till the last few scenes when the proceedings drag". Malini Mannath of Chennai Online opined that "Writer-director Pugazhendi Thangaraj's 'Kaatrukkenna Veli' comes as a whiff of fresh air". Visual Dasan of Kalki rated the film "above average".

== See also ==
- Portrayals of Sri Lankan Tamils in Indian cinema
