= Rasigar Mandram =

- Directed by: Pugazhendhi Thangaraj
- Written by: Pugazhendhi Thangaraj
- Produced by: T. Vellaiyan
- Starring: Uma; Ganesh; Gokul Krishna; Muktha
- Cinematography: S. Dineshkumar
- Edited by: M. N. Raja
- Music by: S. P. Boopathy
- Production company: Thaai Movie Makers
- Release date: 25 May 2007
- Running time: 120 minutes
- Country: India
- Language: Tamil

Rasigar Mandram (transl. Fan Club) is a 2007 Indian Tamil language drama film directed and written Pugazhendhi Thangaraj. The film stars Uma, newcomer Ganesh and newcomer Gokul Krishna, and Bhanu, with Mansoor Ali Khan, Babu Ganesh, Jaguar Thangam, Bose Venkat, and Madhan Bob playing supporting roles. The film was released on 25 May 2007.

== Plot ==
Rameshkanth (Mansoor Ali Khan) and Sathya (Babu Ganesh) are the most famous heroes of Tamil cinema. Kathiravan alias Kathir (Ganesh) is a fan of Rameshkanth, while Pandian (Gokul Krishna) is a fan of Sathya. They are heads of their respective fan clubs in their village, and they have a go at each other at every opportunity. Bharathi (Uma) is the new music teacher of the village school and is surprised to see that the village young men are all members of a cinema actor's fan club.

When a foreign water company took water from the village with the government's permission, Annachi (Jaguar Thangam) and a few villagers demonstrated in the street. Bharathi then explains to the villagers that the water plant would make the village a desert. Kathir's fan club members and Pandian's fan club members decide to protest on their respective sides. Bharathi wanted the fans to make peace, and Annachi reveals that they were all friends a few years back. In the past, Kathir and Pandian were friends, and Kathir's sister Kavitha (Bhanu) was about to marry Pandian. One day, Pandian made fun of Kathir's favorite actor Rameshkanth, the friends fought, and the wedding was cancelled.

The local politician Peethamparam (Mansoor Ali Khan) is receiving money from the water company to support the project. Peethambaram resorts to the divide and rule policy in the village; therefore, he creates a conflict between the two fan clubs. Pandian's group burns Kathir's fan club made with coconut leaves; thereafter, Peethamparam offers Kathir a small ground to construct a fan club. Rameshkanth then donates a large amount to construct a silver statue of him and the fan club. In the meantime, Kathir and Bharathi fall in love. Bharathi then advises Kathir to build a school in place of a fan club. One day, Pandian leaves his sick mother to attend Sathya's new film Pooja. His mother then died, and Kathir performed all the funeral rites. After his return to the village, Pandian is heartbroken. Pandian and Kathir patch up a quarrel, and the fan clubs are dissolved. Bharathi gathered more than 3000 signatures on a petition to stop the project and send it to Delhi. Finally, a collector visits the village and cancels the company's license. The company was allowed to bore to 300 feet, but it ended up boring to 2000 feet.

== Cast ==
- Uma as Bharathi
- Ganesh as Kathiravan alias Kathir
- Gokul Krishna as Pandian
- Muktha as Kavitha
- Mansoor Ali Khan as Rameshkanth and Peethamparam
- Babu Ganesh as Sathya
- Jaguar Thangam as Annachi
- Bose Venkat as Lorry driver
- Madhan Bob
- Arulmani as Pandian's father
- Srilatha as Pandian's mother
- Theni Murugan as Lakshmanan
- Saira Bhanu
- Chella
- Raghuraj Chakravarthy
- Suja Varunee as item number

== Soundtrack ==
Rasigar Mandram

Soundtrack album by S. P. Boopathy
- Released: 2007
- Recorded: 2007
- Genre: Feature film soundtrack
- Length: 22:45
- Producer: S. P. Boopathy

The film score and the soundtrack were composed by S. P. Boopathy. The soundtrack, released in 2007, features 5 tracks with lyrics written by Kabilan, P. Krishnan, Kathirmozhi and Bharathan.

Track	Song	Singer(s)	Duration
1	"Mayajalakari"	Mukesh, Srimathumitha	4:14
2	"Nilavae"	Unni Menon, Reshmi	5:23
3	"Thapadhuthu Adikaiyulae"	Malathy Lakshman	4:40
4	"Vaararu Vaararu"	Tippu	5:08
5	"Aagayame Ingu Vanthu"	Mukesh, Sathyan	3:20

== Reception ==
A reviewer from Sulekha said, "Director Pugazhendi has made a daring attempt bringing out the flaws in his own industry. Though a bold attempt, Pugazhendi has failed to capture the attention of the audience". Another reviewer wrote, "The director has tried to convey a message but failed at many places. Had the screenplay be stronger the film would have definitely been a hit. But still it is a good attempt". Chennai Online wrote "The film could have been a light-hearted satire, or an in-depth assessment of the negative impact on young minds of obsessive star worship. But it turns out to be neither. The scripting is lacklustre and the takes amateurish."
