= Gentlewoman (film) =

2025 Tamil film by Joshua Sethuraman

- Theatrical release poster
- Directed by: Joshua Sethuraman
- Written by: Joshua Sethuraman; Yugabharathi (Dialogues)
- Produced by: Komala Hari; Hari Bhaskaran; PN Narenthra Kumar; Leo Logame Nethaji
- Starring: Lijomol Jose; Losliya Mariyanesan; Hari Krishnan
- Cinematography: Sa Kathavarayan
- Edited by: Elayaraja Sekar
- Music by: Govind Vasantha
- Production companies: Komala Hari Pictures; One Drop Ocean Pictures
- Distributed by: Uthraa Productions
- Release date: 7 March 2025
- Running time: 113 minutes
- Country: India
- Language: Tamil

Gentlewoman is a 2025 Indian Tamil-language drama film written and directed by Joshua Sethuraman in his directoral debut . The film stars Lijomol Jose, Losliya Mariyanesan, Hari Krishnan in the lead roles alongside Rajiv Gandhi, Dharani, Vairabalan, Nanditha Sreekumar, Sudesh and others in supporting roles.

Gentlewoman released in theatres on 7 March 2025.

== Plot ==
A married woman's husband mysteriously disappears, leading to revelations of his affair with a client. As authorities investigate, tensions rise between the two women amid growing suspicions. Poorni lives as an ideal wife to Aravind. One day, in Poorni's absence from home, Aravind attempts to get closer to Poorni's sister, but he slips and falls unconscious. Upon returning home, Poorni discovers Aravind in an unconscious state and uncovers his illicit relations through his phone. In a fit of rage, she stabs him to death and places his body in the refrigerator.

Anna, Aravind's lover, comes searching for him, having filed a complaint with the police about his disappearance. One day, the police ASI sexually assaults her, but Anna manages to kill him and hides his body in her refrigerator, which happens to open while Poorni is visiting Anna's house.

Eventually, several years later, a policeman visits Poorni with Anna, who is now pregnant, and reveals that the circumstances surrounding the ASI's death remain a mystery. As the police officer leaves, he sees a dog eating a bone and, still hungry, the dog bites him to death. The scene concludes with Poorni walking away, carrying a pressure cooker filled with food, which she pours onto a plate to feed the street dogs.

== Cast ==
- Lijomol Jose as Poorni
- Losliya Mariyanesan as Anna
- Hari Krishnan as Aravind
- R. Rajiv Gandhi
- Dharani
- Vairabalan
- Nandithaa Sreekumar
- Sudesh

== Production ==
On 25 January 2025, the first-look poster of the film Gentlewoman was released starring Lijomol Jose in the lead role, who was last seen in Jai Bhim (2021). The film is written and directed by debutant Joshua Sethuraman and produced by Komala Hari and Hari Bhaskaran under Komala Hari Pictures along with PN Narenthra Kumar and Leo Logame Nethaji under their One Drop Ocean Pictures banner. Apart from Lijomol, the film also stars Losliya Mariyanesan and Hari Krishnan in important roles alongside Rajiv Gandhi, Dharani, Vairabalan, Nanditha Sreekumar, Sudesh and others in supporting roles. The technical team consists of Govind Vasantha as the music composer, Yugabharathi as the lyricist and dialogue writer, Sa Kathavarayan as the cinematographer, Elayaraja Sekar as the editor, A Amaran as the production designer, Azar as the dance choreographer and Sudesh as the stunt choreographer.

== Music ==
Gentlewoman

Soundtrack album by Govind Vasantha
- Genre: Feature film soundtrack
- Language: Tamil
- Label: Divo music
- Producer: Govind Vasantha

Govind Vasantha chronology
Bromance (2025)	Gentlewoman (2025)

Singles from Gentlewoman
- 1. "Sulunthee" Released: 20 February 2025; 2. "Aasai Nayagi" Released: 26 February 2025

The soundtrack and background is composed by Govind Vasantha. The pre-release audio launch event was conducted on 19 February 2025 in Chennai. The first single "Sulunthee" released on 20 February 2025. The second single "Aasai Nayagi" released on 26 February 2025.

Track listing
No.	Title	Lyrics	Singer(s)	Length
1.	"Sulunthee"	Yugabharathi	Resmi Sateesh	3:19
2.	"Aasai Nayagi"	Yugabharathi	Govind Vasantha	4:06

== Release ==
=== Theatrical ===
Gentlewoman released in theatres on 7 March 2025. Uthraa Productions had acquired the distribution rights in Tamil Nadu. The film was certified UA16+ by the Central Board of Film Certification.

== Reception ==
=== Critical response ===
Anusha Sundar of OTTPlay gave 3.5/5 stars and wrote "Gentlewoman, much like its title, goes calm on its execution and writing choices, but makes a strong and powerful commentary on patriarchy, moralities, and choices that women make to be on in this society." Abhinav Subramanian of The Times of India gave 3/5 stars and wrote "The film takes its sweet time finding its rhythm, with a first half that feels like watching paint dry in artfully lit rooms. [...] Gentlewoman serves up a satisfying meditation on the consequences of treating women as disposable. In this household, justice is a dish best served cold." Jayabhuvaneshwari B of Cinema Express gave 3/5 stars and wrote "Gentlewoman pushes the audience into ethical ambiguity, much like the film’s characters. While the first half is dedicated to setting the stage and conflict, Gentlewoman truly finds its rhythm in the second half. " Ananda Vikatan critic wrote that "The screenplay travels along with excitement and tears" Kirubhakar Purushothaman of News18 rated 3.5/5 and stated that "Nevertheless, Gentlewoman is a rare specimen in Tamil cinema just for the simple fact that it bets a lot on the poetic idea than on the logistics and the rationality".
