= Neelam (film) =

- Directed by: Venkatesh Kumar. G
- Written by: Venkatesh Kumar. G
- Produced by: Blue Waves Entertainment (Renuka)
- Starring: Sree; Esha; Pavithra; Jagan; Vijay Kumar
- Cinematography: S. Ramalingam
- Edited by: Praveen K. L. N. B. Srikanth
- Music by: Satish Chakravarthy
- Production company: Blue Waves Entertainment
- Running time: 135 minutes
- Country: India
- Language: Tamil

Neelam (transl. Blue) is an unreleased Indian Tamil-language drama film directed by Venkatesh Kumar. It is a Tamil film based in the context of the Sri Lankan Civil War and the rise of Tamil rebel groups including the Tamil Tigers. The film was refused clearance and banned by the Censor board of India as it on the grounds it would damage ties with Sri Lanka. The film features the song 'Alayae o Alayae' by M. S. Viswanathan which was his last song before his demise.

== Cast ==
- Sree as Siva
- Eesha
- Pavithra
- Jagan as Nandu
- Vijay Kumar as Yara
- Bala Singh as Kuppathu Thalaivar
