= Friendship (2021 film) =

2021 film directed by John Paul Raj and Sham Surya

- Theatrical release poster
- Directed by: John Paul Raj; Sham Surya
- Produced by: JPR; Stalin
- Starring: Harbhajan Singh; Arjun; Losliya Mariyanesan
- Cinematography: C. Santha Kumar
- Edited by: Deepak S Dwaraknath
- Music by: D. M. Udhayakumar
- Production companies: Seantoaa Films; Cinemass Studio
- Release date: 17 September 2021
- Country: India
- Language: Tamil

Friendship is a 2021 Indian Tamil-language film directed by John Paul Raj and Sham Surya. A remake of the 2018 Malayalam film Queen, it stars Harbhajan Singh and Losliya Mariyanesan with Arjun in extended cameo. The film marks the acting debuts of Harbhajan Singh and Losliya Mariyanesan, after the latter's stint at Bigg Boss Tamil. The music was composed by D. M. Udhayakumar with cinematography by C. Santha Kumar and editing by Deepak S. Dwarakanth. The film was released on 17 September 2021.

== Cast ==
- Harbhajan Singh as Bhagat Singh alias Bhajji
- Arjun as Advocate Sylender (Extended Cameo)
- Losliya Mariyanesan as Anitha
- Sathish as Jeeva
- Rajesh Vishwanathan as Doctor
- M. S. Bhaskar as Advocate Chanakyan
- J. Satish Kumar as Politician
- Venkat Subha as Politician
- Monika Thomas Puthuran as Madhu
- Robin Prabhu as Prabu
- KPY Bala as Vettukili
- Pala. Karuppiah as Judge
- Badava Gopi as Professor

== Production ==
Principal photography began in March 2020. Harbhajan Singh was chosen to play the main lead role after becoming popular in the state of Tamil Nadu since playing for Chennai Super Kings (CSK) in the Indian Premier League. He often interacted with Tamil spectators while playing for CSK and apparently was offered the role to portray a college student from Punjab in the film. Sri Lankan news anchor Losliya Mariyanesan who rose to prominence after taking part in Bigg Boss Tamil 3 was signed on as the female lead role opposite Singh. In February 2020, Arjun signed on to play a role in the film, while Sathish was chosen to play the supporting role of the friend of Singh's character.

== Soundtrack ==
The soundtrack was composed by D. M. Udhayakumar. The first single, "Superstar Anthem" was released 3 July 2020, coinciding with Harbhajan Singh's birthday. It was revealed that the single was meant to be a tribute to actor Rajinikanth.

Track listing
No.	Title	Lyrics	Singer(s)	Length
1.	"Superstar Anthem"	Gowtham R	Silambarasan
2.	"Friendship Folk"	Raja Gurusamy	Deva, Losliya
3.	"Friendship Gaana"	Gana Achu	Gaana Achu

== Critical reception ==
Sify wrote, "Friendship offers nothing new as it only follows the tried and tested format" and was a "one-time watch". Srinivasa Ramanujam of The Hindu wrote, "Friendship is a dreary watch that has little focus on any of its material. The only clever aspect about the sequences, directed by John Paul Raj and Sham Surya, is that they mostly place Harbhajan among a group of friends and do not get him to talk often", commenting on Singh's poor lip synching. M. Suganth of The Times of India wrote, "For much of its running time, Friendship feels like a checklist of movies set in a college". Thinkal Menon of OTTPlay wrote, "The technical aspects aren't bad, but with a weak screenplay, there is only little which cinematography and background score can enhance".
