= Niru =

Nirmalan Nadarajah
- Born: Nirmalan Nadarajah; 13 January 1982 (age 44); Alaveddy, Jaffna District, Sri Lanka
- Occupations: Music director, film director
- Years active: 2000 - present
- Website: niruonline.com (saved in the Internet Archive)

Niru (born Nirmalan Nadarajah on 13 January 1982) is a Tamil music director and composer. From his rendition of Netriunthom Engal Vitulilae with tracks such as "Pattu Selai", Niru has become a musician. He recently debuted in Tamil films as the music composer in the film Kalabha Kadhalan.

== Biography ==
Having found a passion for music at an early age, Niru discovered an affinity to all things musical.

In 1989, Niru moved to Paris, France, where he was in the tutelage of the Maison Populaire. There, he ameliorated and tuned his precision and skill for melodies. Niru graduated from SAE (Paris) in 2001, an institute with the links to Oxford, UK. Niru then progressed to study Western classical music at the Trinity College of Music, London.

=== 2001 onwards ===
Starting small, Niru initially began by composing jingles for advertisements, soon to be followed by a "nouvelle vague" which brought Tamil Pop to music in France."Moongil Nila", album-extraordinaire encapsulated the vocals of P. Unnikrishnan, a friend of Niru's, Hariharan, Srinivas, Anuradha Sriram, Karthik and Shankar Mahadevan. Lyricists Vairamuthu, Kapilan, Paa Vijay, Palanibharathi and Arivumathi worked on the album.

Niru then dedicated much of his time composing music for various charitable endeavours. In memory of the Asian tsunami of 2004, Niru composed “Kadala Kadal Amma” with the vocals of Tippu by Aruvumathy. Niru also composed for the National Red Cross. Niru became both an independent music director with the release of his debut film; Kalabha Kadhalan in 2005. He also worked on a short film by Arivumani on the backdrop of a tsunami and starring Thangar Bachan's son.

In 2006, Niru's worked on Mayavi of GV Films. He also composed music for Rameswaram.

== Discography ==
- Kalabha Kadhalan (2005)
- Rameswaram (2007)

=== Audio albums ===
- Moongil Nila

=== Television ===
- Mayavi (2006–07)
