= St. Mary's College, Trincomalee =

School in Trincomalee, Sri Lanka

St. Mary's College

Location
- Dockyard Road; Trincomalee, Trincomalee District, Eastern Province; Sri Lanka
- Coordinates: 8°34′15.90″N 81°14′09.70″E

Information
- School type: Public national 1AB
- Founded: 1864
- School district: Trincomalee Education Zone
- Authority: Ministry of Education

St. Mary's College is a national school in Trincomalee, Sri Lanka.

== History ==
The school was founded in 1864. In 1922 the college began to function under the apostolic carmel sisters. At that time there were three assistants with 43 students under the head mistress. in 1963 the Tamil school was amalgamated with the English school. The college celebrated the golden jubilee of the arrival of A.C. sisters in Trincomalee in 1972-September.

== See also ==
- List of schools in Eastern Province, Sri Lanka
