= Kadal Kuthiraigal =

- Poster
- Directed by: Pugazhendhi Thangaraj
- Starring: Thalaivasal Vijay; Rohini; Sreedhanya; Bose Venkat; Prashanthi
- Music by: Devendran
- Production company: Global Media Invest
- Release date: 3 August 2018
- Country: India
- Language: Tamil

Kadal Kuthiraigal (transl. Seahorses) is a 2018 Indian Tamil-language drama film directed by Pugazhendhi Thangaraj. The film stars Thalaivasal Vijay, Rohini, Sreedhanya, Bose Venkat and Prashanthi.

== Cast ==
- Thalaivasal Vijay an activist who is against the installation of a nuclear plant
- Rohini as a Sri Lankan Tamil refugee
- Sreedhanya as a school teacher
- Bose Venkat as Sathya, a swimming coach
- Prashanthi as a Sri Lankan Tamil refugee

== Production ==
The film is about the Eelam crisis in Sri Lanka and the Kudankulam protests in India. Malayalam actress Sreedhanya made her Tamil debut with this film. The film faced trouble ahead of its release with police offices tearing down posters of the film.

== Release and reception ==
The film was scheduled to release in March before being pushed back to 20 July after the Tamil Nadu Film Producers' Council went on strike. The film was postponed to 3 August due to the release of Ghajinikanth; however, Ghajinikanth ended up releasing on 3 August. The film released along with eight other films on 3 August. The Times of India gave the film a rating of one-half out of five stars and wrote that "However, the making is quite sloppy and lacks even the basic cinematic quality needed to hold the attention of the viewers. The inclusion of sub-plots and performances that feel forced make it a tedious watch".
