= Rameswaram (film) =

- Directed by: S. Selvam
- Produced by: S. N. Raja
- Starring: Jiiva; Bhavana; Lal; Bose Venkat
- Cinematography: R. B. Gurudev
- Music by: Niru
- Production company: ita FIlms
- Release date: 30 November 2007
- Country: India
- Language: Tamil

Rameswaram is a 2007 Indian Tamil-language romantic drama film directed by S. Selvam and produced by S. N. Raja. Jiiva and Bhavana play lead roles while Lal, Bose Venkat and Manivannan play supporting roles. The shooting of the film finished in September 2007, with shooting locations being canned in India and in Sri Lanka, for the picturization of a portion. The film was released worldwide on 30 November 2007 and met with mixed reviews; it did not do very well commercially.

== Plot ==
Vasanthi is the daughter of a man who assists refugees. She instantly falls for Jeevan, a Tamil refugee staying in the camp in Rameswaram. Jeevan dreams of returning to his homeland, and discourages her, but he falls in love with her anyway. Vasanthi's cousin, Saravanan, who wants to marry her, enters the story. He joins the local police station as an inspector. The whole family is eagerly awaiting their marriage. Problems arise when the family discovers the relationship. Saravanan and his uncle try to eliminate Jeevan. They keep on troubling him, without much success. Meanwhile, the refugees are allowed to return, and Jeevan has to go with them. He promises Vasanthi to return to marry her. The family is determined to stop him. Vasanthi decides to end her life if Jeevan does not turn up.

== Cast ==
- Jiiva as Shivandha Raja @ Jeevan
- Bhavana as Vasanthi
- Lal as Vasanthi's father
- Bose Venkat as Saravanan
- Manivannan as Jeevan's grandfather
- Vennira Aadai Nirmala as Vasanthi's grandmother
- Lakshanya
- Sampath Ram as a refugee
- Muthukaalai
- Nellai Siva
- Kadhal Saravanan

== Production ==
Jiiva and Gopika were signed on to work on the film in December 2005, with reports suggesting that the film would be based on the refugee crisis affecting Sri Lankan emigrants in Rameswaram. Selvam, an erstwhile assistant to director Pavithran, made his directorial debut through the venture.

== Soundtrack ==
The film has 5 songs and one theme music by Niru. The audio was launched on 21 October 2007 on Sun Music by showing the clips of songs.

Song	Artist(s)	Lyrics
"Alaigallin Osai"	Haricharan, Kalyani	Kabilan
"Ellorayum Ethipoga"	Haricharan, Manikka Vinayagam, Reshmi, Suriya	Kabilan
"Naan Tharai Nila"	Swetha Mohan	Yugabharathi
"Netirunthom Engal"	Arun OS	Na. Muthukumar
"Yedho Senja"	Ranjith, Chinmayi	Yugabharathi
Theme Music	Niru	

== Reception ==
Sify wrote: "Rameswaram is a half-baked venture and is a major let down". The Hindu wrote:"‘Rameswaram’ has laudable technical assistance holding aloft a love line that's run-of-the-mill". Madhumitha of Kalki praised the acting, music and cinematography but panned for focusing more on love, poor pronunciation of Sri Lanka Tamil accent from actors, weak climax and felt if the speed was shown on screenplay just like for dialogues, it would have came out even more beautifully. Chennai Online wrote "Taking a serious issue and packaging it with routine ingredients that go to make a potboiler does not always work out well. For, unless the two are suitably blended, it would end up as a film that neither entertains nor becomes a meaningful experience". Cinesouth wrote "One could commend director Chella for his good intentions in handling such a subject, but seeing him lose his way, one changes one's mind".
