= Thani Oruvan (soundtrack) =

2015 soundtrack album by Hiphop Tamizha

Soundtrack album by Hiphop Tamizha
- Released: 25 July 2015
- Recorded: 2015
- Genre: Feature film soundtrack
- Length: 17:04
- Language: Tamil
- Label: Sony Music India
- Producer: Hiphop Tamizha

Hiphop Tamizha chronology
Indru Netru Naalai (2015)	Thani Oruvan (2015)	Kathakali (2016)

Thani Oruvan is the soundtrack album for the 2015 Tamil film of the same name directed by Mohan Raja and starring Jayam Ravi and Arvind Swamy. The album has five songs in total, all of them being composed by Hiphop Tamizha, and also wrote four out of five tracks, with Mohan Raja penning one of the tracks from the album. It is Hiphop Tamizha's third feature film as a composer, after Aambala and Indru Netru Naalai. The soundtrack album was unveiled by Sony Music India on 25 July 2015, and received positive response from critics and audiences. Thani Oruvan was listed as the most streamed Tamil album and the second best Tamil album of iTunes of the year 2015, followed by O Kadhal Kanmani.

== Development ==
Initially the team approached Devi Sri Prasad, Yuvan Shankar Raja and S. Thaman to be the music composers of the film, with the latter revealing that he had been in talks. However, Hiphop Tamizha was finalised as the music director in March 2015. Adhi, a member of the composer duo stated in an interview with The Times of India, that:

Director [Mohan] Raja wanted the essence of his independent music projects. He wanted social message-driven music that I am known for. So, this film was a return to my indie roots. Even the two romantic numbers ("Kannala Kannala" and "Kadhal Cricket") that I had to compose are not in the usual film-song format.

Raja organised a special preview for one of the scenes, so that Adhi could get an idea of how to approach the songs and the background score. During one recording session, the idea of themes for the hero and the villain struck him, and then suggested it to the director, which resulted in the songs "Theemai Dhaan Vellum" and "Aasai Peraasai". Arvind Swamy recorded the former, which marked his return to playback singing, after he previously recorded two songs for the film Iruvar (1997).

The song "Theemai Dhan Vellum", was used for promotional purposes and was not featured in the film. This was later reused as "Manishi Musugulo Mrugam Neney Ra" in the Telugu film Dhruva (2016), which is a remake of the same film and also retaining the same composer.

== Release ==
The audio rights were purchased by Sony Music India. Initially the album was scheduled to release on 17 July 2015. But, the makers stated that the release was postponed on 25 July 2015, which was confirmed by the Sony Music label. The audio was launched at the Suryan FM 93.5 Radio Station, with the presence of the film's cast and crew. Later on 15 August 2015, coinciding with Independence Day, the audio launch was telecasted on Sun TV.

== Track listing ==
The official tracklist of the film was released on 24 July 2015, a day before the audio launch.

All lyrics are written by Hiphop Tamizha, except "Aasai Perasai" was written by Mohan Raja.

No.	Title	Singer(s)	Length
1.	"Thani Oruvan" (The Power of One)	Bobo Shashi, Hiphop Tamizha	3:49
2.	"Kannala Kannala" (The Melting Point of Love)	Kaushik Krish, Padmalatha	3:35
3.	"Kadhal Cricket" (Love Not Out)	Kharesma Ravichandran	3:33
4.	"Theemai Dhaan Vellum" (Awakening the Monster)	Arvind Swamy, Hiphop Tamizha	3:32
5.	"Aasai Peraasai" (The Greedy Good)	Jayam Ravi	2:35
Total length:			17:04

== Reception ==
The album received positive response from both audiences and critics. Behindwoods gave the album 2.75 out of 5 stating "A finely crafted situational album!" Moviecrow gave the album 3 out of 5 stating "Hip Hop Tamizha consolidated his position in the industry with this vibrant and refreshing third album and the songs are engaging and script oriented." Sify gave the album 3 out of 5 stating "Thani Oruvan is an album that oozes style & texture unlike many staple commercial albums these days. The soundtrack is entirely script oriented & is good to see Hiphop Thamizha venturing out showing his versatility."

Ytalkies in turn stated "Overall, Hip Hop Tamizha consolidates his position in Kollywood by scoring a Hat-trick with Thani Oruvan". Milliblog commented "In their third outing, Hiphop Tamizha regain some of ~~his~~ their debut form." Desi Music Bazaar gave the album 3.5 out of 5 stating "Hiphop Tamizha gives an excellent genre specific album, in which the numbers in the soundtrack are perfect chartbuster material."

The theme song for Arvind Swamy's character Siddharth Abhimanyu, was listed in one of the Greatest Background Score for Villains in Tamil Cinema by Behindwoods.

== Charts ==
Chart (2015)	Peak position	Reference
iTunes Music Charts (Most Streamed Tamil Album)	1	
iTunes Music Charts (Best Tamil Album)	2	
Sify (Best Tamil Music Album)	4	

Singles Chart(s) (2015)	Song title	Peak position	Reference
Radio Mirchi South	Kannala Kannala	1	
iTunes Music Charts	Kannala Kannala	2	
iTunes Music Charts	Kadhal Cricket	5	
iTunes Music Charts	Theemai Dhan Vellum	13	
Best of Tamil Music 2015 (India Today)	Kadhal Cricket	10	
Best of Tamil Music 2015 (India Today)	Theemai Dhan Vellum	14	
Top 25 Songs 2015 (Music Aloud)	Kannala Kannala	21	

== Accolades ==
Edison Awards

- Best Background Score — Hiphop Tamizha (Nominated)
- Best Lyrics — Hiphop Tamizha for "Theemai Dhan Vellum" (Nominated)

Filmfare Awards South

- Best Female Playback Singer — Tamil — Kharesma Ravichandran for "Kadhal Cricket" (Nominated)

Mirchi Music Awards South

- Upcoming Female Vocalist of the Year — Kharesma Ravichandran for "Kadhal Cricket"
- Upcoming Music Composer of the Year — Hiphop Tamizha for "Kadhal Cricket" and "Kannala Kannala"

South Indian International Movie Awards

- Best Music Director — Tamil — Hiphop Tamizha
- Best Female Playback Singer — Tamil — Kharesma Ravichandran for "Kadhal Cricket"

Moviecrow Best of Tamil Music 2015

- Best Music Directors — Hiphop Tamizha (4th place)
- Best Albums — Thani Oruvan (8th place)
- Best Background Score — Thani Oruvan (2nd place)
- Best Lyrics — Hiphop Tamizha for "Theemai Dhan Vellum" (3rd place)
- Best Title/Introductory Song — "Thani Oruvan"
