= Kalabha Kadhalan =

2006 Indian film by Igore

- DVD cover
- Directed by: Igore
- Starring: Arya; Renuka Menon; Akshaya
- Cinematography: R. Madhi
- Music by: Niru
- Production company: Vishnu Talkies
- Release date: 17 February 2006
- Running time: 165 minutes
- Country: India
- Language: Tamil

Kalaabak Kadhalan is a 2006 Indian Tamil-language thriller film directed by debutant Igore, starring Arya, Renuka Menon, and Akshaya. This film was a low-budget production, and the soundtrack was composed by Niru. The film was released on 17 February 2006 and enjoyed relatively quiet success. It shared a similar storyline to S. J. Suryah’s Vaalee and another 2006 film called Uyir.

== Plot ==
An IT manager named Akhilan and a Tirunelveli girl named Anbarasi are a newly married couple. They shift to their new house in Chennai and begin living a happy life, even though their marriage was not based on love.

Soon, Anbarasi's family comes to visit them, and they leave Anbarasi's stepsister, Kanmani, as she wants to pursue her post-graduate studies in multimedia. As Kanmani stays with Anbarasi and Akhilan in the same house, she begins to develop feelings for Akhilan, even though he is her brother-in-law. Kanmani continues to dream of romancing with Akhilan whenever Anbarasi is not around.

Akhilan does not want to hurt his beloved wife, who becomes pregnant and gives birth to their son. Tired of dodging Kanmani for almost a year, he seeks advice from a psychiatrist on how to solve his problem. The psychiatrist tells him to try marrying Kanmani off to anyone else. Akhilan secretly visits Kanmani's village and requests her cousin to pursue and marry her. Following Akhilan's advice, Kanmani's cousin decides to marry her, but she constantly rejects him. After about a month, Kanmani's cousin kidnaps her, rapes her, and leaves her at Akhilan's apartment. This shocks everyone in the family, especially Akhilan. He secretly admits to Kanmani about his action and also says that the plan to rape was not his idea. The whole family forces Kanmani to marry her cousin because of the shame of rape being taboo. The marriage takes place, and Kanmani's family leaves for Thirunelveli.

The next morning, Kanmani commits suicide. Akhilan, Anbarasi, and their son go back to Kanmani's village. Anbarasi's aunt hits Kanmani's husband as she thinks that Kanmani died because of him. Akhilan, standing right beside him, is guilty because it was he who planned all this to avoid Kanmani disturbing his married life. The film ends with the note "Good love, bad love, what is there in love?"

== Cast ==
- Arya as Akhilan
- Renuka Menon as Anbarasi
- Akshaya as Kanmani
- Pawan as Dhana
- Gvanantham as Anbarasi's brother
- Nizhalgal Ravi
- Ilavarasu
- Vanitha Krishnachandran
- Tiruppur S. Selvaraj
- Maali
- Veena

== Production ==
The film is the directorial debut of Igor, who previously directed advertisement commercials. It was shot at locations including Chennai, Nagercoil, Tenkasi, Kutralam, and Mahabalipuram.

== Soundtrack ==
The soundtrack was by debutant Niru, based in France, who has released several Tamil music albums there.

- "Chellame Idhu" – Karthik, Sunitha Sarathy
- "Pattuselai" – Krishnaraj, Sriram, Nithyasree
- "Manmeethu Aangal" – Haricharan
- "Thogai Virithu" – Chinmayee
- "Urugudhe" – Andrea Jeremiah

== Critical reception ==
Lajjavathi of Kalki praised Igor for handling a plot which is against culture without vulgarity while also praising the casting choices, Akshaya's acting, art direction, cinematography and Balakumaran's dialogues but panned the music. Cinesouth wrote, "Playing out the story with three people inside a house speaks for the brilliance of Igor’s screenplay. If some double entendres and showing of the heroine in shades of a vamp had been avoided, ‘Kalaba Kaadhalan’ could have been a smart guy." Malini Mannath of Chennai Online wrote, "'Kalaabha Kadhalan' had the potential to turn into a horrific thriller if only the script had been better worked out more convincingly in the second half". Deccan Herald wrote, "The movie has been directed by a debutant director Igor and one must admit that he has done a farily good job and his screenplay is also focused devoid of any commercial elements".
