= Pugazhendhi Thangaraj =

Indian film director and screenwriter

Pughazhendhi Thangaraj
- Occupation: Film director
- Years active: 2001—present

Pughazhendhi Thangaraj is an Indian film director and screenwriter who has worked on Tamil films. He often makes films set in the backdrop of the Sri Lankan Civil War.

== Career ==
Pughazhendhi began his career with Kaatrukkenna Veli (2001), before continuing to work on mid-sized films.

In 2011, he released Uchithanai Muharnthaal, which tells the story of a 13 year old rape victim during the Sri Lankan ethnic war of 2009. Starring Sathyaraj and Sangeetha in the lead roles, the film won critical acclaim and was also awarded the Tamil Nadu State Film Award for 3rd Best Film.

In 2016, Pughazhendhi made a short film titled Avargal again on the plight of Sri Lankan Tamils. The following year, he released a book titled Eelam 87 based on the same topic.

He next made Kadal Kuthiraigal (2018), a tale based on the different issues faced by Tamils in the two sides of the Palk Strait. Prior to release, the film had to make 20 cuts to the original version during the censorship process. The film garnered negative reviews, with a critic from the Times of India stating "the making is quite sloppy and lacks even the basic cinematic quality needed to hold the attention of the viewers".

== Filmography ==
Year	Film	Notes
2001	Kaatrukkenna Veli	
2005	Ulla Kadathal	
2007	Rasigar Mandram	
2011	Uchithanai Muharnthaal	Tamil Nadu State Film Award for 3rd Best Film
2018	Kadal Kuthiraigal	
