= Ilampuyal =

- Directed by: K.S.Thurai
- Written by: K.S.Thurai; Kanmani Raja Mohamed (additional dialogue)
- Produced by: K.S.Thurai
- Starring: Vashanth Sellathurai; Poornitha
- Cinematography: Kitchas
- Edited by: Satisssh Kurusowa
- Music by: Vashanth Sellathurai
- Production company: Alaikal Movies International
- Release date: 1 May 2009
- Countries: Denmark; India
- Language: Tamil

Ilampuyal (transl. Young Storm) is a 2009 Danish-Indian Tamil language film directed by K. S. Thurai. The film stars his son Vashanth Sellathurai, Poornitha, Karunas, Sriman, Ravishankar and Sinthuraj. The music was composed by Vashanth Sellathurai.

The film premiered in 20 Danish theatres in October 2007. The film was released 1 May 2009. Satellite rights went to Kalaignar TV.

== Cast ==
- Vashanth Sellathurai as Puyal Ezhilan
- Poornitha as Thendral Bose
- Karunas as Narayanan
- Sriman as Sathies Shankar
- K. S. Thurai as Vikneshwar
- Ravishankar
- Sinthuraj as Paandiyan Gobal
- Sujibala as Mozhi
- Ravi Sugathevan as Iniyan Bose
- Morten Bergholt as a journalist
- Tommy Krabe Andersen as the minister
- Uldus as Nila Amaran in a special appearance

== Production ==
K. S. Thurai, a Sri Lankan Tamil residing in Denmark who previously directed Pookkal (2004) and stage shows in Europe, directs this film. His son, Vashanth, a computer engineer, played the lead role in the film, composed the music and did the graphic works. The film was made on a low budget and highlights the issues Sri Lankan Tamil refugees face. Ilampuyal was shot in Denmark and Chennai, India over a period of 85 days in 2007. The Carl-Henning Pedersen Museum was used as a house for one of the main characters. Journalist Morten Bergholt played himself in the film.

== Soundtrack ==
All music is composed by Vashanth Sellathurai.

Tracklist
No.	Title	Singer(s)	Length
1.	"Oru Mutham Thara"	Rehna
2.	"Unnai Thoduvathilae"	Karthik, Malathi
3.	"Vaa Vaa En Anbae"	Saindhavi, Ananth
4.	"Yalisai Senthamilae"	Srinivas, Sofiya Sathish
5.	"Poorattam Poorattam"	Manikka Vinayagam, Roshini
6.	"Sethavanin Kathayai"	Roshini, Ananth
7.	"Idhalgal Pavalam"	Ramu
8.	"Ilam Puyal Aramba Esai"	Spraban Clif, Princeran, Besrin

== Extnerla links ==
- On the way to Kollywood 1
- On the way to Kollywood 2
- Ilampuyal at IMDb
