= Uchithanai Muharnthaal =

- Theatrical release poster
- Directed by: Pugazhendhi Thangaraj
- Written by: Tamilaruvi Manian (dialogue)
- Screenplay by: Pugazendhi Thangaraj
- Story by: Pugazendhi Thangaraj
- Produced by: P. Steven; Sri Balasundaram; T. Sivakanesh; K. Ramanan; Vijayshankar
- Starring: Neenika; Sathyaraj; Seeman; Sangeetha
- Cinematography: B. Kannan; Azhagiya Manavalan
- Edited by: B. Lenin
- Music by: D. Imman
- Production companies: Global Media & Entertainment
- Distributed by: Gemini Film Circuit
- Release date: 16 December 2011
- Country: India
- Language: Tamil

Uchithanai Muharnthaal is a 2011 Indian Tamil-language film directed by Pugazhendhi Thangaraj and assisted by Prashanth Ramamurthy. The plot revolves around a 13-year-old Sri Lankan Tamil girl, portrayed by child actress Neenika. The film also stars Sathyaraj, Seeman and Sangeetha, while featuring music scored by D. Imman. It was released on 16 December 2011.

== Plot ==
Punithavadhi is a 13-year-old Sri Lankan Tamil girl who lives with her parents in Batticaloa, Sri Lanka (SL). The neighborhood and the surrounding area more often remain a mute victim to the atrocities perpetrated on unarmed men, women, and children by the heavily armed SL army troops. Punitha becomes a rape victim by the SL soldiers, which leaves her pregnant.

Punitha’s mother, to save her daughter from further trouble, lands up on Indian shores by illegal means. Professor Nadesan, who is under fire from the local police for offering refuge to illegal immigrants from SL, patronizes Punitha and her mother. He and his wife Nirmala take Punitha to Dr. Rekha for regular medical checkups.

When Natesan and Nirmala are away on some work, Punitha disappears from their house and lands up in the clutches of some local rowdies. She gets unexpected help from a transgender security guard who saves her from the custody of the rowdies and takes her safely to Natesan’s residence. With the security guard’s help, Natesan brings the culprits to book. During the course of this case, Natesan befriends the local police inspector Charles Anthony.

The story takes a turn when Punitha is known to have contracted HIV from the rape. The rest of the film revolves around the struggle to save Punitha and her child. Punitha is ultimately unable to be saved and dies along with her father (who dies earlier in the film as a result of being shot by the SL Army) and mother (who dies in the film after being abducted by the SL Army when looking for her husband). The end credits show all three of them walking along the Batticaloa beach happily.

== Cast ==
- Neenika as Punithavadhi
- Sathyaraj as Professor Nadesan
- Seeman as Charles Antony
- Sangeetha as Nirmala Nadesan
- Nassar as Dr. Deivanayagam
- Lakshmi Ramakrishnan as Dr. Rekha
- Lavanya as Mrs. Charles Antony
- Aishwarya as Security Guard
- Sathik Basha as Sathik Basha (Cameo appearance)

== Soundtrack ==
The soundtrack was composed by D. Imman.

Track listing
| No. | Title | Lyrics | Singers | Length |
|---|---|---|---|---|
| 1. | "Uchithanai Mukarnthal" | Kasi Anandan | Mathangi Jagdish, Priyanka, Balaram | 5:00 |
| 2. | "Iruppai Thamizha Neruppai" | Kasi Anandan | D. Imman | 4:37 |
| 3. | "Chutti Pennae" | Kathirmozhi | SuVi, Durga Viswanath, Harini Ravi, Shekkinath Shawn | 4:27 |
| 4. | "Yeno Yeno" | Kathirmozhi | Sirkazhi G. Sivachidambaram | 2:18 |
| 5. | "Sweet Memories" (Instrumental) | - | Blues Harp | 1:21 |
| Total length: | | | | 17:43 |

== Reception ==
Sify gave the film 3/5 stars and wrote, "On the whole Uchithanai Muharnthal is able to strike a chord with those who sympathise with the plight of Tamils in the island nation, and the brutalities of the war." The film won the Tamil Nadu State Film Award for Third Best Film.
