= Kumar G. Venkatesh =

Indian film actor

Venkatesh Kumar. G
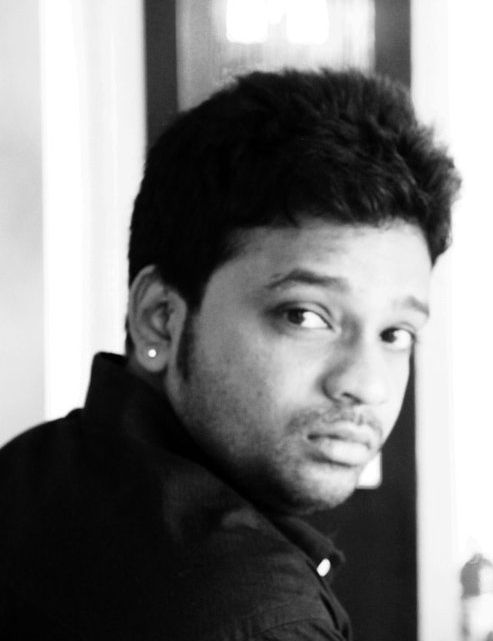
- Venkatesh in 2011
- Born: 25 June 1981 (age 45); Chennai, Tamil Nadu, India
- Years active: 2012–present
- Website: www.studio18co.in

Venkatesh Kumar. G (born 25 June 1981) is an Indian Film director and screenwriter working in Tamil cinema. His first project was the short film "White Dirt". He made his debut in the Tamil film industry I 2012 with his film Neelam, which is based on the Rise of Rebel Groups in Sri Lanka. In 2016 he Produced and Directed a Tamil feature film Unakkul Naan which was premiered in Norway and was released worldwide in April 2016. In 2017 he has come up with his second feature film Lightman. His Film The Beautiful Eye explored the world of the visually challenged. His third feature film A Home Away from Home won him the best director award at 14th Norway Film Festival 2023. He was awarded the Honorary Diploma by the Russian federal agency Rossotrudnichestvo for active work on the development of international humanitarian and public relations, exemplary organization, preparation and holding of significant events in the field of culture and education, popularization of the Russian language". He is the great-grandson of Tamil Scholar and diplomat Rao Sahib K Kothandapani Pillai.

== Filmography ==
=== As director ===
Year	Film	Notes
2013	Neelam	Unreleased
2014	Kannadi Bommaigal	
2016	Unakkul Naan	
2017	Lightman	
2017	The Beautiful Eye	Documentary
2020	Oru Manithan Oru Veedu Oru Ulagam	
2023	A Home Away from Home	
TBA	Seerum Puli	Unreleased

=== Short films ===
- Crossword
- Vidiyalai Thedi-In Search of Dawn
- White Dirt
- Dancing Neurons
- Sadhai
- Aridharam
- Cinderella
- Beg
- Clown
- New Life

=== Documentaries ===
- Moths 'Vittil Poochigal'
- Home
- Kannadi Bommaigal
- Feedback
- Being Fighter
- The Beautiful Eye
