= Suresh Joachim =

Canadian film actor, producer, and multiple-Guinness World Record holder

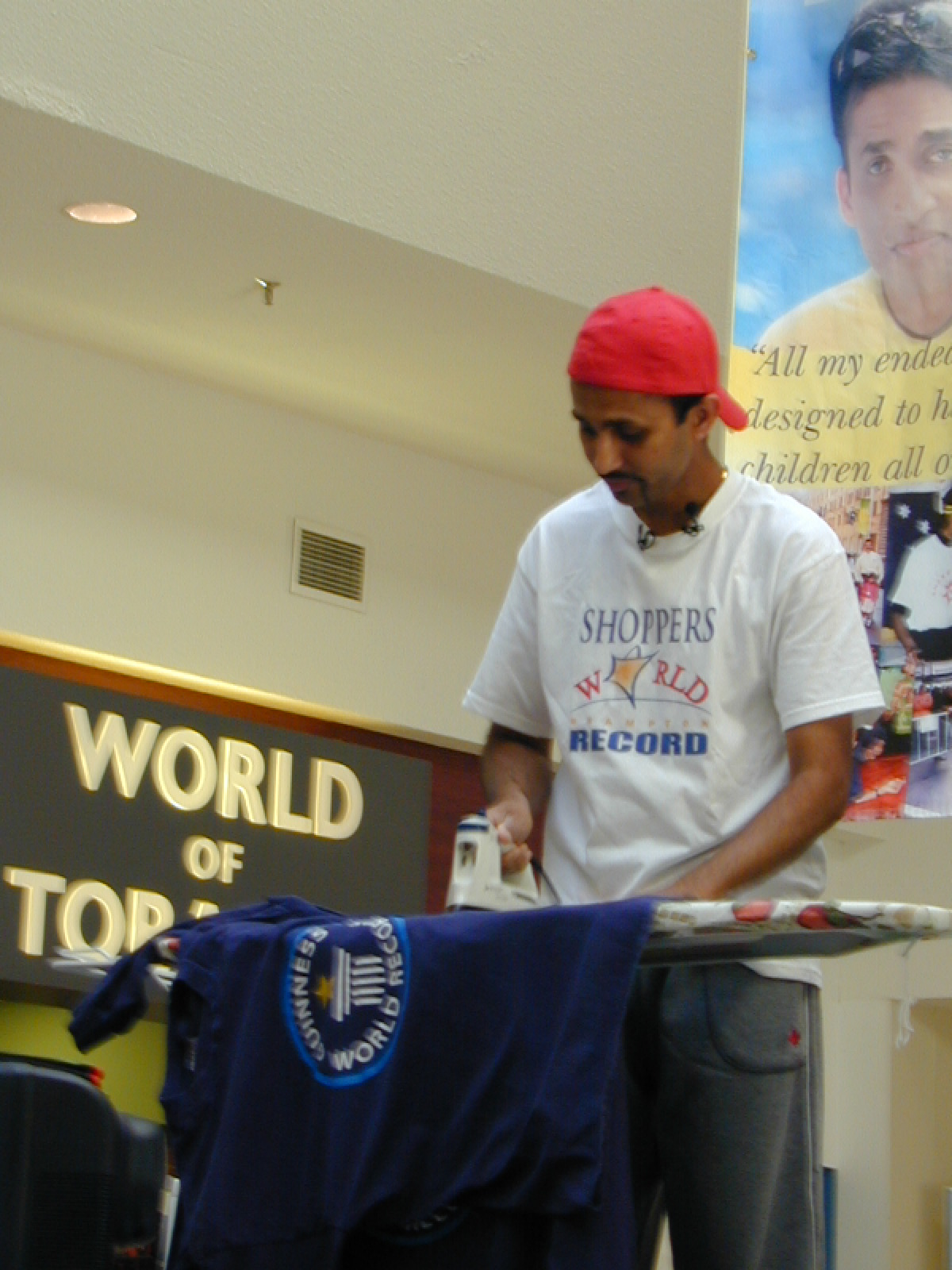
- Suresh Joachim, minutes away from breaking the ironing world record at 2 days 7 hours and 5 minutes, at Shoppers World Brampton.
- Born: August 17, 1968 (age 58)
- Known for: Guinness World Record

Suresh Joachim Arulanantham (born August 17, 1968) is a Canadian film actor, producer, and multiple-Guinness World Record holder who has broken more than 60 world records. He is the founder, & CEO, of WBBAS Inc, WBBAS Supply Chain Inc (WBBASSC) No Poverty No Disease No War, World Peace Marathon and Suresh Joachim International Group Of Companies.

== World records ==
Farthest distance run, whilst carrying a 4.5 kg brick in a nominated ungloved hand in an uncradled downward position. Joachim traveled 126.675 km around the Westfield Hornsby mall on Florence Street in Hornsby, New South Wales, Australia.

A broadcast by Joachim on Geethavaani Tamil Radio in Toronto, Ontario, Canada, lasted for a record 120 hours. It was broadcast between 4 p.m. on 23 June and 4 p.m. on 28 June 2003.

On March 17, 2006, he set the world record for a couple dance marathon by dancing 1 day, 7 hours consecutively with Tiffany Lesko.

Basketball dribbling distance in 24 hours.

=== Other Guinness-acknowledged records ===
- Greatest distance covered in 24 hours while dribbling a basketball is 177.5 km (110.3 mi) at Vulkanhallen, Oslo, Norway on 30–31 March 2001
- Travelled a distance of 214.96 km (133.57 mi) in 48 hours on a treadmill at Crown Promenade, Melbourne, Victoria, Australia on 27–29 July 2002
- Travelled 86 km (53 mi) on a treadmill in 12 hours on 28 July 2002 at Crown Promenade, Melbourne, Victoria, Australia
- The longest drumming marathon by an individual lasted for 84 hours and was achieved from 1 to 4 February 2004 at the Magic Factory, Zürich, Switzerland
- Travelled 659.27 km (409.65 mi) on a treadmill in one week at Waou Club Med Gym, Paris, France between 31 July and 7 August 2004
- Longest continuous crawl of 56.62 km (35.18 mi)
- Broke the Guinness World Record with Claudia Wavra of Germany for movie watching with a final time of 123 hours and 10 minutes on October 7, 2008. Both received $10,000 for their achievement.
- He produced and starred in a Tamil language Indian film titled Sivappu Mazhai (2009) in attempt to break the record for the fastest shooting time for a feature film.

== Filmography ==
Year	Film	Role	Language	Notes
2009	Sivappu Mazhai	Nanthan	Tamil	Guinness World Record for Fastest-Made Motion Picture (from scripting to screening in 1 week 4 days 23 hours and 45 minutes)
2015	Good Morning, Good Afternoon Good Evening	Siva	English	Guinness World Record for longest uncut film

== Documentary ==
Year	Film	Role	Language	Notes
2010	A Million In The Morning	Suresh	English	Guinness World Record In order to beat the world record for non-stop movie watching, you have to stay up for 5 days, 3 hours and watch at least 57 films. Guinness lets you have a ten-minute break after every film but if you even look away or take a long blink, you are out (and no, you cannot do drugs!). This documentary was meant to candidly follow eight contestants as they competed to break the world record and also take home the $10,000 prize Netflix offered every winner.
2011	Mission Possible	Suresh	English	Guinness World Record. Suresh Joachim holds 35 Guinness World Records. Follow his journey as he prepares to set another milestone.
2015	Nerukku Naer	Suresh	Tamil	Malaysia TV. Suresh Joachim and his challenge.
