= Vijitha =

Vijitha is a Sinhalese masculine given name. It may refer to:

- Vijitha Amerasekera, Sri Lankan athlete
- Vijitha Berugoda, a Sri Lankan politician
- Vijitha Herath, Sri Lankan politician
- Vijitha Meddegoda, Sri Lankan navy officer
- Vijitha Rohana, Sri Lankan sailor
