= Koogle Kuttappa =

2022 film by Sabari–Saravanan

- Theatrical release poster
- Directed by: Gurusaravanan–Sabari
- Screenplay by: Gurusaravanan
- Based on: Android Kunjappan Version 5.25 by Ratheesh Balakrishnan Poduval
- Produced by: K. S. Ravikumar; D. Vijaykumaran
- Starring: K. S. Ravikumar; Tharshan; Losliya
- Cinematography: Arvi
- Edited by: Praveen Antony
- Music by: Ghibran
- Production companies: RK Celluloids; Kallal Global Entertainment
- Release date: 6 May 2022
- Country: India
- Language: Tamil

Koogle Kuttappa is a 2022 Indian Tamil-language science fiction-comedy drama film directed by debutants Sabari–Saravanan and produced by K. S. Ravikumar under the RK Celluloids banner and co-produced by Kallal Global Entertainment. The film stars Ravikumar himself with Tharshan, Losliya Mariyanesan, and Yogi Babu in prominent roles. The film's music is composed by Ghibran, with cinematography handled by Arvi and editing done by Praveen Antony. It is a remake of the 2019 Malayalam film Android Kunjappan Version 5.25. The film was released on 6 May 2022.

== Plot ==
Subramani Gounder is a stubborn old man who is very reluctant to get accustomed to any new-age technology. He resides in Coimbatore with his son Aadhityan alias Aadhi, a mechanical engineer. Subramani wants his son to be by his side during his last days, and that is why he prohibits his son from applying for any job, and to refuse any job offer he receives. Aadhi, in frustration, demands on going to Germany, as he had got a job in a Robotics firm there. This causes an argument between the father and son, which ends in Aadhi leaving for Germany.

While in Germany, Aadhi meets Tharani, a Sri Lankan Tamil girl. They form a close bond, and Tharani tells Aadhi about her father who died of Alzheimer's. Aadhi, while in Germany, gets a call from his cousin Babu, that Subramani is ill. Aadhi feels guilty about his inability to take care of his father, and he discusses the idea of resigning with Tharani and his boss. However, his boss introduces him the robotic home nurse to take care of his father on his tough times.

Aadhi returns home with the latest Android Robot to take care of his father. Although Subramani was hesitant to accept the robot into his life, even being somewhat scared of it at first, eventually develops a strong liking to the robot and then, unexpectedly, becomes too attached to it. It is named Kuttappa (transl. short man), which creates some confusion among the locals, as there was also another man called Kuttappan (Rahul's father who Rahul hates the most and wants to kill him). Slowly, the robot becomes irreplaceably close to Subramani's heart. Kuttappa also helped Subramani to make contact with his ex-lover Pavithra.

Soon enough, Subramani starts to see Kuttappa as his own son. However, Aadhi becomes extremely worried about Subramani. So, he decides to quit his job and go back home along with Thaarani. Aadhi convinces Subramani to do his daily chores without Kuttappa. However, after having food with Aadhi, he sees Tharani repairing a disassembled Kuttappa. Enraged to see this, Subramani tries to stop it, but Aadhi stops him. Subramani furiously asks what Aadhi is playing at, and Aadhi flares back that the robot will eventually kill him. Subramani shouts back that even if Aadhi can't take care of him, at least to let Kuttappa do it. Frustrated Aadhi, now restores Kuttappa to its previous state. That night, Tharani and Aadhi watches a CCTV Camera footage of a previously modelled robot strangling its aged customer to death. He becomes scared and finds Subramani and Kuttappa are missing. Subramani goes to temple with Kuttappa through a forest way. Meanwhile, Aadhi and Tharani, searching for Subramani and Kuttappa, arrive at the forest with Babu. After Subramani uploads his face photo to Pavithra, Kuttappa tells Subramani that what Aadhi told was right and he is not a human being but a machine whose job was to assist him. He doesn't want Subramani to love him or he doesn't know it also. He tells him to leave him in the forest and to go back. Subramani becomes emotional and heartbroken when Kuttappa tells him like that. When Aadhi finds Subramani, Rahul attacks Kuttappa. In its in-built security reflex, Kuttappa strangles Aadhi. However, Subramani saves Aadhi. Subramani, Aadhi, Tharani and Babu heads back to home, and while on the back of Aadhi's motorcycle, Subramani sees Aadhi with teary eyes. Pavithra, who waited for Subramani now sees Subramani's profile picture is now updated with his face photo.

== Cast ==
- K. S. Ravikumar as Subramani Gounder
- Tharshan as Aadhi
- Losliya as Tharani
- Ilambarathi and Bommi as Koogle Kuttappa (voice actor Savitha Reddy)
- Yogi Babu as Babu
- Pavitra Lokesh as Pavithra
- Prankster Rahul as Rahul
- Poovaiyar as Babu's friend
- Suresh Chandra Menon as Humanoid Dynamics CEO
- G. Marimuthu as Municipal officer
- Pandi as Rahul's friend
- Manobala as doctor
- R. Parthiban as the narrator

== Production ==
Sabari and Saravanan, an erstwhile assistant directors of K. S. Ravikumar wanted to remake the 2019 Malayalam film Android Kunjappan Version 5.25 and approached Ravikumar with an acting role. But the duo was not able to get the producer for the film. Hence Ravikumar agreed to produce the film and bought the remake rights. The principal photography for the film began in January 2021 with the majority of the portions was shot in Tenkasi, Courtallam and nearby locations. The team planned for a 10-day schedule in a foreign country in April. The film was initially titled as Google Kuttappan and later changed to Koogle Kuttappa.

== Music ==
Ghibran composed the soundtrack and background score of Koogle Kuttappa. The first single "Bomma Bomma" was released on 25 December 2021. The second single "Alai Alai" was released on 21 January 2022.

Track listing
No.	Title	Lyrics	Singer(s)	Length
1.	"Bomma Bomma"	Arivu	Arivu, Sivaangi Krishnakumar	3:39
2.	"Alai Alai"	Madhan Karky	G. V. Prakash Kumar, Deepthi Suresh	5:07
3.	"Yaro Yaro"	Madhan Karky	Aravind Srinivas	4:12
4.	"Soorathenga"	Viveka	Gold Devaraj	3:57
Total length:				16:54

== Critical reception ==
Praveen Sudevan of The Hindu said, "But for a film that deals with topics that can give us existential worry – old age, loneliness, and AI – it serves up quite a few delightful moments (though it ends on a wistful note)". M. Suganth of The Times of India who gave 2.5 stars out of 5 stars, stated that "It is mainly the scenes between Subramani and Kuttappa that keep us involved as it is amusing to see this odd couple build their bond". Navein Darshan of Cinema Express who gave 3 stars out of 5 stars stated that "But when such endearing films, the ones that stress the importance of being there for each other knock on our doors in our own language, how can we not welcome them with open arms?" Maalai Malar noted that Sabari and Saravanan, who worked as assistant directors to Ravikumar, are directing the film and instead of telling the story directly, they have made the screenplay by showing the characters around.
