= Santhanam filmography =

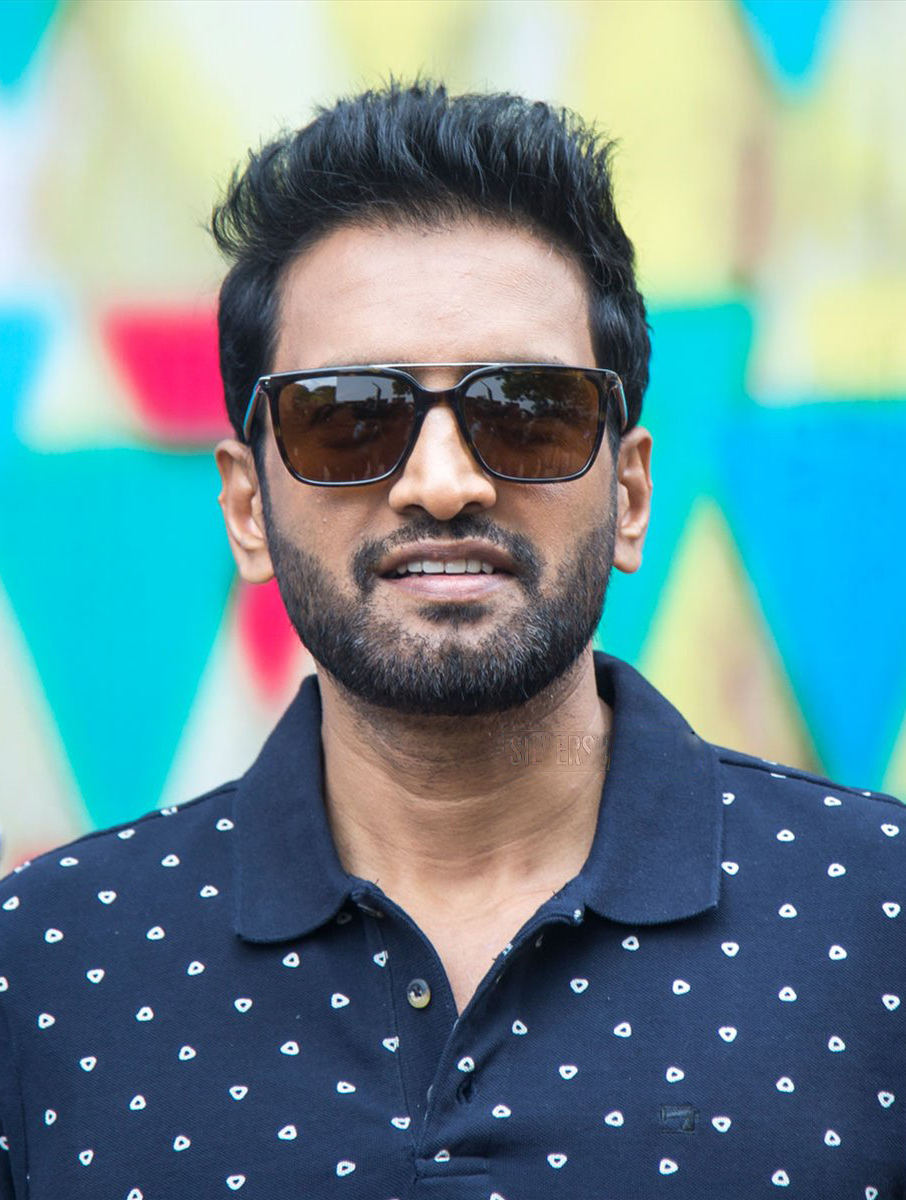
Santhanam at the A1 Press Meet

Santhanam is an Indian actor and film producer who has predominantly appeared in Tamil films as a comedian and also has appeared in films in a lead role. He began his career on television shows including Vijay TV's Lollu Sabha enacting the lead role in spoofs of Tamil films. He was subsequently given a chance by actor Silambarasan in a supporting role in Manmadhan (2004) and then was signed on to appear in films including Sachien (2005) and Polladhavan (2007). He appeared in a one-off leading role in Shankar's production Arai En 305-il Kadavul (2008) and subsequently became a staple feature as a comedian in successful Tamil films during the period, with his market popularity helping stuck films find distributors. Santhanam has also had embarked on collaborations with directors including M. Rajesh's comic trilogy of Siva Manasula Sakthi (2009), Boss Engira Bhaskaran (2010) and Oru Kal Oru Kannadi (2012).

== Film ==
Year	Film	Role(s)	Notes	Ref.
2002	Pesadha Kannum Pesume	Vikram's classmate	Uncredited role	
2002	Kadhal Azhivathillai	Aravind	Uncredited role	
2004	Manmadhan	Bobby		
2005	Sachien	Santhanam		
2005	Englishkaran	College Student		
2005	February 14	College Student		
2005	Oru Kalluriyin Kathai	David		
2005	Anbe Aaruyire	Jackie		
2006	Idhaya Thirudan	Mahesh		
2006	Something Something... Unakkum Enakkum	Arivu		
2006	Sillunu Oru Kaadhal	Rajesh		
2006	Vallavan	Bala		
2006	Rendu	Seenu		
2007	Veerasamy	Veera Saamy's friend		
2007	Mudhal Kanave	Sathish		
2007	Viyabari	Suryaprakash's PA		
2007	Kireedam	Balasubramaniam		
2007	Veerappu	Puli's Friend		
2007	Thottal Poo Malarum	Ravi's friend		
2007	Azhagiya Tamil Magan	Murugesan (Muruga)		
2007	Machakaaran	Vicky's friend		
2007	Polladhavan	Sathish		
2007	Billa	Krishna		
2008	Kaalai	College Student		
2008	Vaitheeswaran	Madan		
2008	Kannum Kannum	Murali	25th Film	
2008	Santosh Subramaniam	Srinivasan		
2008	Arai Enn 305-il Kadavul	Raasu	Debut in a lead role	
2008	Kuselan	Nagercoil Nagaraj		
2008	Jayamkondaan	Bhavani		
2008	Mahesh, Saranya Matrum Palar	Mahesh's friend		
2008	Silambattam	Sama		
2009	Siva Manasula Sakthi	Vivek	Vijay Award for Best Comedian	
2009	Thoranai	Vellaichamy		
2009	Maasilamani	Pazhani		
2009	Vaamanan	Chandru		
2009	Modhi Vilayadu	Kaduku		
2009	Malai Malai	Vimal Haasan		
2009	Kandein Kadhalai	Mokkai Raasu		
2009	Kandhakottai	Velu		
2009	Balam	Mahesh's friend		
2010	Theeradha Vilaiyattu Pillai	Kumar		
2010	Guru Sishyan	Gayathri's uncle		
2010	Maanja Velu	Manikkam		
2010	Thillalangadi	Dr. Putti Paul		
2010	Moscowin Kavery	Devaraj		
2010	Boss Engira Bhaskaran	Nallathambi	Vijay Award for Best Comedian	
2010	Enthiran	Siva		
2010	Mandhira Punnagai	Senthil		
2010	Chikku Bukku	Vijay		
2010	Ayyanaar	Shiva	50th Film	
2010	Aattanayagan	Lingam's friend		
2010	Chutti Chathan	Scientist Vasu		
2011	Siruthai	Kaatuppoochi	Vijay Award for Best Comedian	
2011	Thambikottai	Saisa		
2011	Singam Puli	Buji Babu		
2011	Vaanam	"Tantana Tan" Seenu		
2011	Kandaen	Saami		
2011	Udhayan	Mukundhan		
2011	Deiva Thirumagal	Vinod		
2011	Markandeyan	Yaanaimudi		
2011	Yuvan Yuvathi	Sakkarai		
2011	Vanthaan Vendraan	Delhi		
2011	Vellore Maavattam	Kumaravel		
2011	Velayudham	Speed		
2011	Osthe	Selvam		
2012	Vinayaka	Senthil	Scenes reshot for Tamil version only	
2012	Muppozhudhum Un Karpanaigal	Chandru		
2012	Kadhal Pisase	Srinath		
2012	Oru Kal Oru Kannadi	Parthasarathi "Partha"	Vijay Award for Best Comedian	
2012	Leelai	Vicky		
2012	Kalakalappu	Vettupuli		
2012	Ishtam	Thiyagu		
2012	Saguni	Appadurai "Rajni"		
2012	Naan Ee	Poottu Govindhan	75th Film; Scenes reshot for Tamil version only	
2012	Mirattal	Chari		
2012	Thaandavam	Sathyan		
2012	Podaa Podi	Himself	Guest appearance in "Love Pannlama" song	
2012	Neethaane En Ponvasantham	Prakash		
2013	Alex Pandian	Kaalayan		
2013	Kanna Laddu Thinna Aasaiya	Kaalkattu Kaliyaperumal	Also producer	
2013	Settai	Nagaraj "Nadupakka Nakki"		
2013	Theeya Velai Seiyyanum Kumaru	Nokia	Vijay Award for Best Comedian	
2013	Thillu Mullu	American groom	Guest appearance	
2013	Singam 2	Susai		
2013	Pattathu Yaanai	Poongavanam & Gouravam	Double role	
2013	Thalaivaa	Logu		
2013	Ainthu Ainthu Ainthu	Gopal		
2013	Ya Ya	Rajkiran "Sehwag"		
2013	Raja Rani	Sarathy		
2013	Vanakkam Chennai	Narayanan		
2013	All in All Azhagu Raja	Kalyanam & Kaali	Double role	
2013	Endrendrum Punnagai	Baby		
2014	Veeram	Bail Perumal		
2014	Salalah Mobiles	Azhagarsamy	Malayalam film	
2014	Inga Enna Solluthu	Ezhumugam		
2014	Idhu Kathirvelan Kadhal	Mayilvaganam		
2014	Bramman	Nandhu		
2014	Thalaivan	Kannan		
2014	Vallavanukku Pullum Aayudham	Shakthi	Also producer	
2014	Vanavarayan Vallavarayan	Anjali's suitor	Guest appearance	
2014	Aranmanai	Paalsaamy		
2014	Lingaa	Lingaa's sidekick	100th Film	
2015	I	Babu		
2015	Aambala	Inspector RDX Rajasekhar		
2015	JK Enum Nanbanin Vaazhkai	Thothathri & Paartha	Double role	
2015	Nannbenda	Sivakozhundhu "Kozhundhu"		
2015	Inimey Ippadithaan	Seenu	Also producer	
2015	Vaalu	Tyre		
2015	Vasuvum Saravananum Onna Padichavanga	Vasu		
2016	Vaaliba Raja	Raja		
2016	Idhu Namma Aalu	Sherlock Holmes	Guest appearance	
2016	Dhilluku Dhuddu	Kumar		
2016	Tamilselvanum Thaniyar Anjalum	Nasa		
2016	Nambiar	Nambiar		
2017	Enakku Vaaitha Adimaigal	Santhanam	Guest appearance	
2017	Sakka Podu Podu Raja	Santa		
2019	Dhilluku Dhuddu 2	Viji	Also producer	
2019	A1	Saravanan		
2020	Dagaalty	Guru	Also co-producer	
2020	Biskoth	Rajasimma, Raja, Simmha & Baabubali	Quadruple role	
2021	Parris Jayaraj	Jayaraj		
2021	Dikkiloona	Mani, EB Mani & Mappillai Mani	Triple role	
2021	Sabhaapathy	Sabhaapathy		
2022	Gulu Gulu	Gulu Gulu		
2022	Agent Kannayiram	Detective Kanayiram		
2023	DD Returns	Sathish	125th Film	
2023	Kick	Santhosh		
2023	80s Buildup	Kathir		
2024	Vadakkupatti Ramasamy	Ramasamy		
2024	Inga Naan Thaan Kingu	Vetrivel		
2025	Madha Gaja Raja	Kalyanasundaram	Delayed release; Filmed in 2012	
2025	Devil's Double Next Level	Krishnamoorthy "Kissa"		
TBA	Amali Thumali	TBA	Unreleased; Filmed in 2011–14	
TBA	Mannavan Vanthanadi	TBA	Unreleased; Filmed in 2016	
TBA	Server Sundaram	K. Sundaram	Unreleased; Filmed in 2016	

== Discography ==
=== As singer ===
Year	Film	Song	Composer	Source
2013	Thalaiva	"Vanganna Vanakkanganna"	G. V. Prakash Kumar	
2016	Nambiar	"Aara Amara"	Vijay Antony	
2022	Kick	"Saturday is Cominguuu"	Arjun Janya	
2024	Vadakkupatti Ramasamy	"Abarakko Dabarakko"	Sean Roldan	
