= Dhilluku Dhuddu (film series) =

Indian film series

- Film series logo from First film
- Created by: Rambhala
- Original work: Dhilluku Dhuddu (2016)
- Owner: Sri Thenandal Films; Handmade films; RK Entertainment; The Show People; Niharika Entertainment

Films and television
- Film(s): Dhilluku Dhuddu (2016); Dhilluku Dhuddu 2 (2019); DD Returns (2023); Devil's Double Next Level (2025)

Audio
- Soundtrack(s): Dhilluku Dhuddu; Dhilluku Dhuddu 2; DD Returns; Devil's Double Next Level

Dhilluku Dhuddu (transl. Money for Guts; initialism as DD) is an Indian Tamil-language horror comedy film series. In the film series stars Santhanam. While the first two films were directed by Rambhala, the third film was directed by S. Prem Anand. The film series consists of unrelated horror stories. All of the films in the film series are noted for being commercially successful films featuring Santhanam as a lead actor.

== Production ==
After the success of Dhilluku Dhuddu (2016), Rambhala subsequently worked on Dhilluku Dhuddu 2 (2019), a sequel to his first film, with the same technical team and Santhanam. He revealed that he was keen to explore some ideas written for the original that he was unable to feature owing to time constraints.

In 2023, the third film titled as DD Returns (Dare Demons Returns) previously title Dhilluku Dhuddu 3. The film take over Rambhala's assistant S. Prem Kumar of the project as film director.

In 2025, the fourth and final film announced on 21 January 2025, coinciding with Santhanam's birthday, titled as DD Next Level, changed title to Devil's Double Next Level.

== Recurring cast ==
This table lists the actors who appear in two or more of the Dhilluku Dhuddu films. Since the first two film's director Rambhala, Santhanam and S. Prem Anand (third film director) are from the comedy show "Lollu Sabha", many comedians from the show feature in the films including Maaran, Manohar and Swaminathan (third film).

List indicators
- A dark grey cell indicates the character was not in the film.
- TBA blue cell indicates the character name not fixed yet in the film.

Actors	Films			
Actors	Dhilluku Dhuddu	Dhilluku Dhuddu 2	DD Returns	Devil's Double Next Level
Santhanam	Kumar	Vijay (Viji)	Sathish	Krishnamoorty "Kissa"
Rajendran	Sketch Mani	Viji's uncle	Professor	"Veen Pechu" Babu
Lollu Sabha Maaran	Teacher	"Mike" Maaran	Ravi	"All Language" Arumugam
Redin Kingsley			Benny	Gopal
T. M. Karthik	Kajal's brother-in-law	Dr. Karthik		
Bipin		Garudaraja Bhattadhri (Maya's father)	Kulanthai	
Lollu Sabha Manohar	Kumar's neighbor		Manohar	

== Additional crew and production details ==
Occupation	Film			
Occupation	Dhilluku Dhuddu (2016)	Dhilluku Dhuddu 2 (2019)	DD Returns (2023)	Devil's Double Next Level (2025)
Director/Writer	Rambhala	Rambhala	S. Prem Anand	S. Prem Anand
Producer	N. Ramasamy	Santhanam	C. Ramesh Kumar	Venkat Boyanapalli; Arya
Cinematographer	Deepak Kumar Pathy	Deepak Kumar Pathy	Deepak Kumar Pathy	Deepak Kumar Pathy
Editor	Gopi Krishna	Madhavan M.	N. B. Srikanth	Bharath Vikraman
Music	S. Thaman, Karthik Raja	Shabir	OfRo	OfRo
Production Companies	Sri Thenandal Films	Handmade Films	RK Entertainment	The Show People; Niharika Entertainment

== Reception ==
The first film received mixed to positive reviews, the second film was released to mixed reviews from critics but positive response from audience, and the third film received positive reviews. The fourth film received mixed reviews.
