= Lollu Sabha Seshu =

Indian comedian and actor (died 2024)

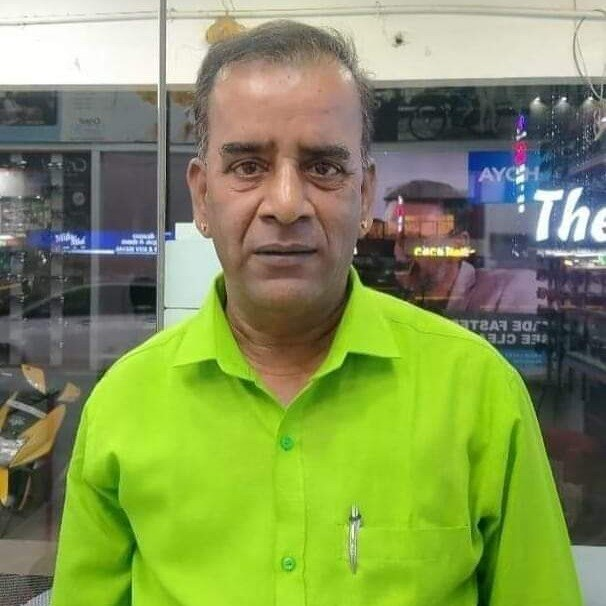
- Born: Lakshmi Narayanan Seshu c. 1963
- Died: 26 March 2024 (aged 60); Chennai, Tamil Nadu, India

Comedy career
- Years active: 2003–2024
- Genre: Comedy

Lakshmi Narayanan Seshu (c. 1963 – 26 March 2024), also popularly known by his stage name Lollu Sabha Seshu, was an Indian actor and comedian who appeared in Tamil cinema. He started his career with the television show Lollu Sabha alongside other comedians, including Santhanam.

== Career ==
Seshu made his film acting debut in Dhanush starrer Thulluvadho Ilamai (2002) which was directed by Dhanush's father Kasthuri Raja. However, he got his first career breakthrough after entering the television field.

Seshu first garnered attention through his performances in the spoof show Lollu Sabha on Vijay TV. The series spawned several successful comedians, who eventually moved on to appear in Tamil cinema including many of the show's lead cast such as Santhanam, Swaminathan, Jeeva, and Balaji. Other supporting actors such as Yogi Babu and Madhumitha also became popular actors in the film industry. Seshu's most memorable iconic Lollu Sabha performance was when he spoofed veteran actress Gandhimathi's role from the 1983 film Mann Vasanai.

Seshu frequently collaborated with Santhanam in many of his films including Velayudham (2011) A1 (2019), Dikkiloona (2021), Parris Jeyaraj (2021), Gulu Gulu (2022), 80s Buildup (2023), Kick (2023) and Vadakkupatti Ramasamy (2024). He also played a supporting role in his son Abhilash's short film Aurora (2020). He was also well known for his comedy tracks in Draupathi (2020) and Naai Sekar Returns (2022).

He was supposed to be part of the film project titled Sister where Aishwarya Rajesh is set to play a main lead role as the project was announced around January 2024.

== Death ==
Seshu died at a private hospital in Chennai, on 26 March 2024, at the age of 60. Prior to his death, he reportedly underwent treatment after suffering from a sudden heart attack on 15 March 2024 and doctors revealed that three blockages were identified in his heart. In March 2024, just weeks before his death, he also attended as one of the cadres of Lollu Sabha team for a reunion meet for a television program which was aired in Vijay TV.

== Selected filmography ==
=== Films ===
- Thulluvadho Ilamai (2002)
- Remote (2004)
- Thirudiya Idhayathai (2005)
- Veerappu (2007)
- Thambikku Indha Ooru (2010; uncredited)
- Neethana Avan (2010)
- Velayudham (2011)
- Othigai (2011)
- Oru Kal Oru Kannadi (2012)
- India Pakistan (2015)
- Pazhaya Vannarapettai (2016)
- Sketch (2018)
- A1 (2019)
- Draupathi (2020)
- Naanga Romba Busy (2020)
- Dikkiloona (2021)
- Anti Indian (2021)
- Parris Jeyaraj (2021)
- Naai Sekar Returns (2022)
- Bestie (2022)
- Kadamaiyai Sei (2022)
- Gulu Gulu (2022)
- 80s Buildup (2023)
- Rayar Parambarai (2023)
- Kannitheevu (2023)
- Single Shankarum Smartphone Simranum (2023)
- Vadakkupatti Ramasamy (2024) as Priest
- Ranam Aram Thavarel (2024)
- Boomer Uncle (2024)
- Aranmanai 4 (2024)
- Inga Naan Thaan Kingu (2024)
- Sooriyanum Sooriyagandhiyum (2024)
- Vasco Da Gama (2024)
- Brother (2024)
- Baby and Baby (2025)

=== Television ===
Year	Title	Role	Channel	Notes
2003-2008	Lollu Sabha		Star Vijay	
2006, 2015	Chinna Papa Periya Papa	Thirisangu	Sun TV	appeared on Season 2-3
2007-2008	Comedy Bazaar		Jaya TV	
2008	Deepavali Deepavali		Vasanth TV	
2010	Mama Maaple	Neelananda Swamiji's assistant	Sun TV	
2023	Joking Bad	Gus Annachi	Netflix India	Parody of Breaking Bad
