= DD1 =

DD1 may refer to:

- DD National, an Indian national channel
- Dhilluku Dhuddu, or DD 1, a 2016 Indian film, first in the Dhilluku Dhuddu (film series)
- PRR DD1, Pennsylvania Railroad's class of electric locomotives
- Austral DD1, an Australian road coach
