= A1 (film) =

2019 Indian film by Johnson K

- Theatrical release poster
- Directed by: Johnson K
- Written by: Johnson K
- Produced by: S. Raj Narayanan
- Starring: Santhanam; Tara Alisha Berry
- Cinematography: Gopi Jagadeeswaran
- Edited by: Leo John Paul
- Music by: Santhosh Narayanan
- Production company: CircleBox Entertainment
- Distributed by: 18 Reels
- Release date: 26 July 2019
- Running time: 109 minutes
- Country: India
- Language: Tamil

A1: Accused No. 1 is a 2019 Indian Tamil-language romantic black comedy film written and directed by Johnson K in his directorial debut. The film stars Santhanam and Tara Alisha Berry. Producer S. Raj Narayanan of CircleBox Entertainment has produced this movie. The music for the film is composed by Santhosh Narayanan and cinematography is handled by Gopi Jagadeeswaran. The movie was edited by Leo John Paul, song lyrics were penned by Rokesh, art direction was executed by A. Raja, dance choreography by Kalyan and Sandy, and stunts by Hari Dinesh. Principal photography commenced around October 2018. The film was released on 26 July 2019.

== Plot ==
Saravanan a.k.a. Saro is a happy-go-lucky guy and retail cloth store owner, from North Chennai. IT employee Divya is the only daughter of an honest and respected Tehsildar Anantharaman. Divya wishes to marry a rogue but has a condition that he should be from her same Brahmin community. Divya spots Saro fighting with a few goons and immediately develops a liking towards him as she mistakes him to be a Brahmin since he is sporting a naamam on forehead that day. Divya proposes to Saro, and they both start dating.

Weeks later Divya finds out that Saro is not a Brahmin and decides to break up. Saro gets angry but decides to break up as Divya is strong in her decision of marrying only a Brahmin. Few days later Anantharaman gets a heart attack while walking on the street. Saro spots Anantharaman struggling and saves him by admitting in the hospital at the right time. Divya gets to know that it was Saro who saved her father in a timely manner, which makes her patch up with Saro again.

Saro and family meet with Anantharaman for a marriage proposal, but Anantharaman turns it down, citing caste differences. Divya does not want to go against her father's wishes as she respects her father a lot. Saro challenges Divya that every human has an evil side and her father is not an exception, to which Divya does not agree. Saro gets frustrated because of the break-up and is drunk. He discusses with his friends that he wants to kill Anantharaman as he is the main villain for his love.

The next day, Saro's drunk friends decide to kidnap and kill Anantharaman as they are thinking of helping Saro. They kidnap Anantharaman while he is out for jogging but forcefully feed him poison, following which he faints. Saro gets angered upon knowing his friends' foolish plan and scolds them for their actions. However, to safeguard him and his friends, Saro takes Anantharaman's body to Divya's house and lies that her father died due to a heart attack while jogging.

Everyone gathers for the cremation ceremony of Anantharaman. Saro tries hard to pretend that no one finds out the truth about his friends' involvement in the murder. A police inspector finds the suspicious and takes them to the spot where they supposedly found the body. He figures out their action and plans to arrest them. In the ensuing melee, the inspector accidentally shoots an ex-MLA who was peeing afar, and the gang escapes from him. As they reach Divya's house, Saro's friend discloses that they have mistakenly fed him anaesthesia instead of poison, and so Anantharaman should only be in an unconscious state and is not dead yet. Saro gets even more angry as his friends have put him in bigger trouble.

Suddenly, there comes a couple of women claiming them to be Anantharaman's wives. One of them is a fish vendor, while other one is a young north India woman with an infant son. Divya gets shocked upon knowing that her father had extramarital affairs with a few women. Now slowly, Anantharaman wakes up as the anaesthesia's effect is recovered and is shocked to see all of his women together. He tries to convince them but ends up getting bashed. Saro uses this situation to his advantage and informs Divya that this drama was set by him to prove that every human has an evil side. Finally, Saro joins with Divya.

== Cast ==
- Santhanam as Saravanan
- Tara Alisha Berry as Divya
- Saikumar as Inspector Jayaraman
- Motta Rajendran as CCTV Chidambaram
- Yatin Karyekar as Anantharaman
- M. S. Bhaskar as Loganathan
- Lollu Sabha Maaran as Murugan
- Thangadurai as Mathi (Bike mechanic)
- Redin Kingsley as Mani
- Swaminathan as Swaminathan
- Seshu as Ananthraman's brother-in-law
- Uma as Divya's Mother
- Meera Krishnan as Bhanumathi
- Lollu Sabha Manohar as Saravanan's neighbour
- Bujji Babu as Varadharajan
- Mahana Sanjeevi as Divya's friend
- Bijili Ramesh as Bijili

== Production ==
The film is the directorial debut Johnson K, known for his works in Nalaiya Iyakkunar. He described the film as a romantic comedy during its first half and a black comedy during the latter half. Filming began in October 2018 in Chennai.

== Soundtrack ==
The music is composed by Santhosh Narayanan. The audio rights were sold to Think Music.

No.	Title	Lyrics	Singer(s)	Length
1.	"Chitukku Chitukku"	Rokesh	Santhosh Narayanan	3:46
2.	"Maalai Nera"	GKB	Chinna, Arunraja Kamaraj	2:58
3.	"Priya Priya"	Rokesh	Gana Muthu, Isaivani	3:26
4.	"Aatha Valikkudu"	Sean Roldan	Sean Roldan	1:41
Total length:				12:01

== Reception ==
Anupama Subramaniam of Deccan Chronicle wrote "Santhanam delivers a stress-buster. If you'd want a movie that is akin to a stress buster, then A1 should be your choice after a heavy workday." Sreedhar Pillai in Firstpost says "Santhanam's film is an engaging slapstick comedy not concerned with drama or plot." Thinkal Menon in The Times of India wrote "The plot as such offers nothing new, but A1 provides ample entertainment, thanks to the chemistry between Santhanam, MS Bhaskar, Thangadurai, Manohar and Saikumar." Srivatsan S of The Hindu stated "At 109 minutes, this chaotic film is a careful manifestation of problematic ideas, masquerading in the name of harmless comedy".

Vishal Menon wrote for Film Companion, "Does the story make sense? Not for a second. In fact the whole second half plays out like one long Lollu Sabha sketch. Do the characters have arcs? Not even remotely". Ashameera Aiyappan of The New Indian Express rated 2.5 out of 5 stars stating "A1's teasers proclaimed that humour is the only thing that you should look for from it". Sify rated 3 out of 5 stars stating "Popcorn entertainer". S. Subhakeerthana of The Indian Express rated 1.5 out of 5 stars stating "A1 has plenty of Lollu Sabha jokes and Santhanam delivers them in his style—but those are the same old things we saw in Inimey Ippadithaan, Sakka Podu Podu Raja and Dhilluku Dhuddu 2". Sowmya Rajendran of The News Minute rated 2 out of 5 stars stating "'A1' offers some laughs and exposes people's hypocrisy; the lack of layers is easily explained – this is a Santhanam film and not lasagna".
