= Lollu Sabha Manohar =

Indian comedian and actor

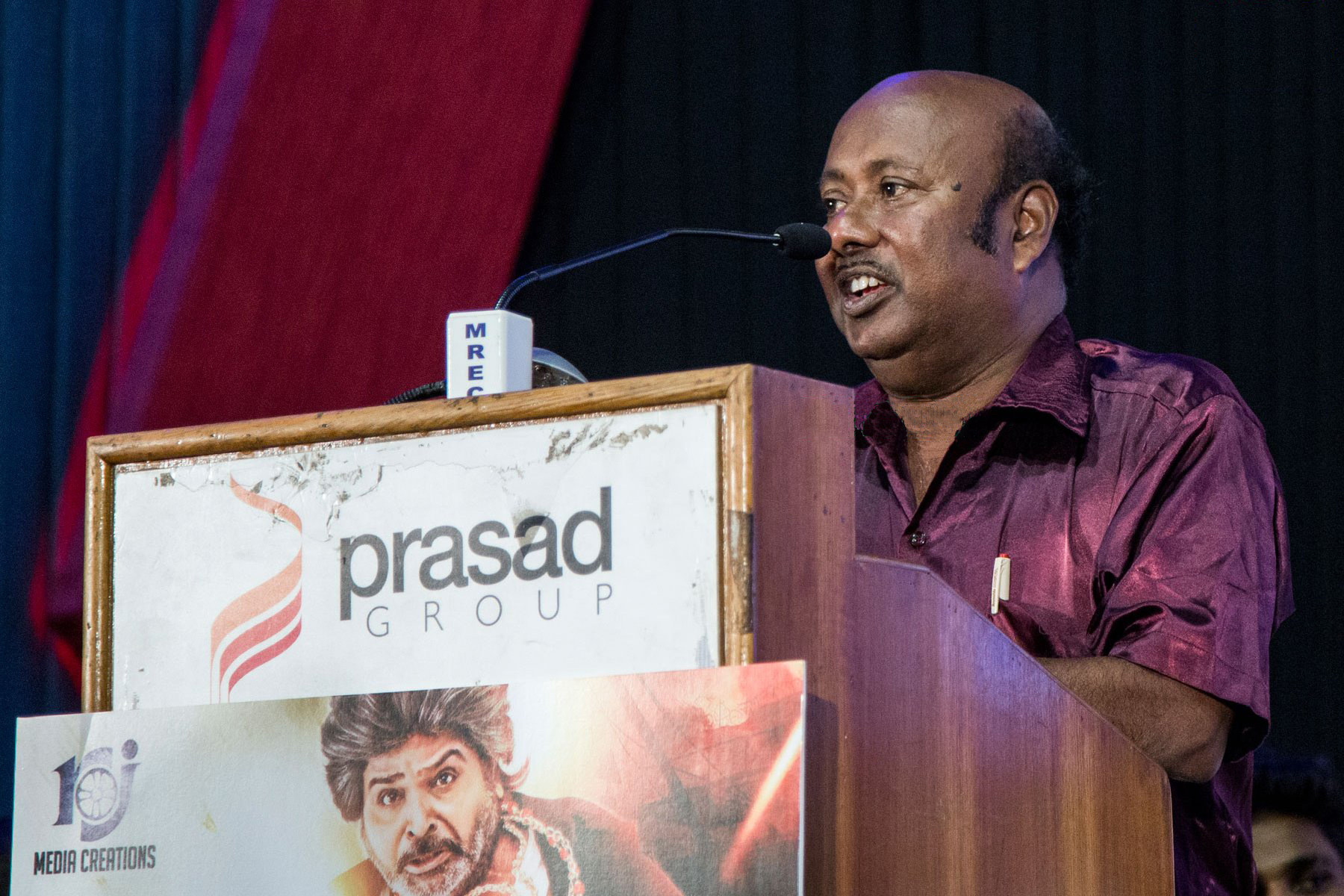
- Born: P. Manoharan; 10 January 1958 (age 68); Madras, Tamil Nadu (India)
- Children: 2

Comedy career
- Years active: 2003–present
- Genre: Comedy

Lollu Saba Manohar (born 10 January 1958) is an Indian actor and comedian who has appeared in Tamil cinema. He started his career with the television show Lollu Sabha alongside other comedians, including Santhanam.

== Career ==
Manohar first garnered attention through his performances in the spoof show Lollu Sabha on Vijay TV. The series spawned several successful comedians, who eventually moved on to appear in Tamil cinema including many of the show's lead cast such as Santhanam, Swaminathan, Jeeva, and Balaji. Other supporting actors such as Yogi Babu and Madhumitha also became popular actors in the film industry. At the height of the show's success, Manohar, along with three other cast members, received mysterious parcel bombs. As a part of the show, Manohar was known for his signature body language. In 2017, he protested against PETA's proposed ban of jallikattu.

== Filmography ==
Films

Year	Title	Role	Notes
2009	Laadam	Constable	
2009	Eesa	Karuthapandi	
2009	Karthik Anitha	Pappu	
2009	Malai Malai		
2010	Vaadaa	Annamalai travels owner	
2010	Maanja Velu	Manickam's father	
2010	Thambi Arjuna	Manohar	
2010	Thambikku Indha Ooru	Prisoner	Uncredited role
2011	Velayudham	Bajan Lal Settu	
2012	Muppozhudhum Un Karpanaigal	Kidnapper	
2013	Alex Pandian	Saani Urundai	
2013	Kanna Laddu Thinna Aasaiya	Ad film actor	
2013	Endrendrum Punnagai	Current	
2014	Sigaram Thodu	Aarumugam	
2014	Pattaya Kelappanum Pandiya	Hospital attender	
2015	Agathinai		
2015	Nannbenda	Siruvan	
2015	Aivarattam		
2015	Trisha Illana Nayanthara	CD Raghunathan	
2015	Inimey Ippadithan		
2016	Manithan	Google	
2016	Saalaiyoram		
2016	Bayam Oru Payanam		
2016	Enakku Innoru Per Irukku	Asirvatham	
2016	Dhilluku Dhuddu		
2016	Tamilselvanum Thaniyar Anjalum	Kathiresan	
2016	Manal Kayiru 2	Interviewee	
2017	Anbanavan Asaradhavan Adangadhavan	Manohar Thatha	
2017	Enbathettu		
2017	Aangila Padam	Rail Murugan's henchman	
2017	Enakku Vaaitha Adimaigal		
2018	Silukkuvarupatti Singam	Mobile thief	
2018	Melnaattu Marumagan		
2018	Kaathadi	House owner	
2018	Kolamavu Kokila		
2019	A1	Saravanan's neighbour	
2019	Zombie		
2020	Biskoth	Manohar	
2020	Irandam Kuththu	Ghost	
2020	Naanga Romba Busy	Manohar	
2020	Kanni Raasi	Swamy	
2020	Time Up		
2021	Chidhambaram Railway Gate		
2021	Pei Mama		
2021	Murungakkai Chips	Ganeshan	
2021	Theerpugal Virkapadum	Radhravel's staff member	
2022	Kichi Kichi		
2022	Kaatteri	Short film maker	
2022	Therkathi Veeran		
2022	Rathasaatchi		
2022	Sree Raja Manikandan		
2022	Varalaru Mukkiyam		
2023	Pallu Padama Paathukka	Herbal products seller	
2023	Karungaapiyam	Siddharth Abhimanyu	
2023	DD Returns	Local Manager Manohar	
2023	Dhillu Irundha Poradu		
2023	E-mail		
2023	Odavum Mudiyadhu Oliyavum Mudiyadhu		
2024	Padikada Pakkangal		
2024	Vasco Da Gama	Govind's father	
2024	Dhil Raja		
2025	Madha Gaja Raja	Cab driver	
2025	Rajini Gaang		
2026	Karuppu Pulsar		

=== Television ===
Year	Title	Role	Channel	Notes
2003-2008	Lollu Sabha		Star Vijay	
2009	Comedy Puram	Judge		A Comedy Show presented by Symphony Recordings. They have also released a music DVD.
2010	Mama Maaple		Sun TV	
2021	Bigg Boss 4		Star Vijay	Special guest
2022	Sutta Kadhai	Agent Amar	Kalaignar TV	
2023	Joking Bad	Jessie Rosapayan	Netflix India	Parody of Breaking Bad
2025	Seruppugal Jaakirathai	Munusamy	ZEE5	
