= Rambhala =

Indian film director

- Born: Ram Bala; Tamil Nadu, India
- Occupation: Film director
- Years active: 2004-present

Rambhala is an Indian film director, who has directed Tamil films. He rose to fame through his work on the comedy television show Lollu Sabha, and has gone on to make feature films including Dhilluku Dhuddu (2016) and Idiot (2022).

== Career ==
In the early 1980s, Rambhala initially worked as an assistant to directors Rama Narayanan and K. Bhagyaraj, before taking on the job of a script consultant, where he supervised Tamil content for Vijay TV. In 2002, he pitched the idea of Lollu Sabha to the group's programming head Pradeep Milroy Peter, who approved for the show to be made. The concept was initially supposed to be a two-minute skit as a part of another show called Breakfast Show that Rambhala was working on, but the channel's head, Vijay Iyer, asked for 30-minute episodes to be made instead. The success of Lollu Sabha paved the way for a new era of comedy shows across Tamil channels. Several cast members who worked on the production including Santhanam, Jeeva, Swaminathan, Manohar and Yogi Babu all subsequently moved to work in the film industry.

Despite his significant experience, Rambhala did not become a film director until the mid-2010s. In 2015, he began work on a proposed project starring Shiva and Nandita Swetha, but the film did not materialise. Rambhala's first feature film was eventually Dhilluku Dhuddu (2016), a horror comedy featuring Santhanam in the lead role.

In late 2016, he worked on the pre-production of a proposed project featuring G. V. Prakash Kumar and Vadivelu in the lead roles. However, the film was later dropped. He later announced a comedy drama titled Daavu featuring Chandran and Reba Monica John, but production was stopped after a single schedule. He subsequently worked on Dhilluku Dhuddu 2 (2019), a sequel to his first film, with the same technical team and Santhanam. He revealed that he was keen to explore some ideas written for the original that he was unable to feature owing to time constraints.

Rambhala is currently working on Vandhan Suttan Repeatu, which stars Chandran, Reba Monica John and Meenakshi Govindarajan in the lead roles. He has also announced plans on making Dhilluku Dhuddu 3 with Santhanam in the future.

== Filmography ==
Films

Year	Film	Notes
2016	Dhilluku Dhuddu	
2019	Dhilluku Dhuddu 2	
2022	Idiot	

Television

- Lollu Sabha (2003-2008; 156 episodes)
