= Lollu Sabha Maaran =

Indian actor, comedian

- Born: Ilancheran; 3 january 1964 Villivakkam, Chennai, Tamil Nadu, India
- Other name: Comedy Bazaar Maaran
- Occupations: Actor; comedian
- Years active: 2003–present
- Known for: Comedy Bazaar; Lollu Sabha

Ilancheran, better known as Lollu Sabha Maaran, is an Indian actor and comedian known for his work in Tamil films. He became a well-known face when he started acting in the television show Comedy Bazaar, which aired on Jaya TV.

== Early life ==
Ilancheran was born to Mani, a political orator for Dravida Munnetra Kazhagam. Ilancheran changed his name to Maaran for his career. Later, he joined the Communist Party, and he was interested in communist art. He also painted communist paintings in his area, which led his father to feel he was against his father's ideology. So he changed his thoughts and later worked in a ration shop before entering the television acting industry.

== Career ==
He started his career as an art director for television shows. After that, he got a chance to act in the television shows Comedy Bazaar and Lollu Sabha. After gaining popularity through his television comedy shows, Lollu Sabha and Comedy Bazaar, he acted as a comedian in many films after making his debut with Student Number 1 (2003).

In 2014, after acting in C. S. Amudhan's Rendavathu Padam, he made his directorial debut with the film Iraimagan. but due to financial problems, he approached his friend Santhanam to refer a producer. The film was later shelved. However, at the time, the Lollu Sabha duo Muruganand (Murugan and Prem Anand) were making their debut as film directors with the film Inimey Ippadithan. They asked him to help with the additional improvements to the dialogues, so he worked on that film.

In 2016, his friend Mahendran Rajamani also made his directorial debut with a film named Enakku Vaaitha Adimaigal. Mahendran offered a supporting role in the film. So Maaran acted and also wrote the lyrics for one song. After that, he acted as a comedian in many films with Santhanam. In 2021, Dikkiloona was released on ZEE5. The film received mostly negative reviews, and the dialogues of Maaran were praised. And then he got chances to act in more films like Naai Sekar, Kaathuvaakula Rendu Kaadhal, and Naai Sekar Returns.

== Filmography ==
=== As actor ===
- All films are in Tamil, unless otherwise noted.

==== Films ====
List of performances in films
Year	Film	Role	Notes and Ref.
2003	Student Number 1	Sathya's classmate	
2003	Military		
2005	Neeye Nijam	Sankavi	
2006	Pachchak Kuthira	Pachchamuthu's friend	
2006	Vanjagan	Police constable	
2007	Deepavali	Billu's friend	
2007	Veerappu	Mokkai	
2009	Madhavi	Mani	
2011	Othigai		
2016	Dhilluku Dhuddu	Teacher	
2017	Enakku Vaaitha Adimaigal	Sowmya Narayanan's friend	
2017	Sakka Podu Podu Raja	Film crew member	
2019	Dhilluku Dhuddu 2	"Mike" Maaran	
2019	A1	Murugan	
2020	Biskoth	Ambulance driver	
2021	Parris Jeyaraj	Venkat's uncle	
2021	Dikkiloona	Kumar	
2021	Sabhaapathy	Thief	
2021	Gaadi Ulla Body	Drunkard	
2022	Naai Sekar	Maali	
2022	Kaathuvaakula Rendu Kaadhal	Maaran	
2022	Bestie	Madhan	
2022	Gulu Gulu	Drunkard	
2022	Naai Sekar Returns	Raakozhi's friend	
2023	Kannitheevu	Selvam	
2023	DD Returns	Ravi	
2024	Vadakkupatti Ramasamy	Murugesan	
2024	J Baby	Senthil	
2024	Star	Pandian's friend	
2024	Inga Naan Thaan Kingu	Reel Rolex	
2024	Miss You	Chals	
2025	Bottle Radha		
2025	Devil's Double Next Level	"All Language" Arumugam	
2025	Thalaivan Thalaivii	Bus conductor	
2025	Coolie	Kumar	
2025	Marutham		
2026	Lockdown		
2026	TN 2026	Gandharvan	
2026	Karuppu	S. Kumaran	
2026	Idhayam Murali	CSK Bus Driver	
2026	Lakshmikanthan Kolai Vazhakku	Moorthy	
2026	Pyaar Prema Kalyanam	Ganesh	
2026	Immortal		

Key
†	Denotes films that have not yet been released

==== Television ====
List of performances and appearances on television
Year	Program	Role(s)	Channel	Notes	Ref.
2003–2008	Comedy Bazaar	various roles in each episode	Jaya TV		
2005–2008	Lollu Sabha	various roles in each episode	Vijay TV		
2006	Kasthuri		Sun TV		
2008	Deepavali Deepavali	Host	Vasanth TV		
2009	Comedy Puram	Judge		A Comedy Show presented by Symphony Recordings. They have also released a music DVD.	
2010	Mama Maaple	Neelananda Swamiji	Sun TV		
2012	Adhu Idhu Edhu	Guest	Vijay TV		

=== As lyricist ===
Year	Song	Film	Composer
2017	"Mannenna Vepenna"	Enakku Vaaitha Adimaigal	Santhosh Dhayanidhi

=== As voice actor ===
Year	Film	Character	Notes
2007	Inimey Nangathan	Govind	

== Confusion ==
In May 2021, actor Manimaran died from COVID-19. Some print and media posted a photo of Lollu Saba Maaran and published the news. Maaran then explained via video that he was fine.
