= Joking Bad =

- Genre: Black comedy
- Written by: Rahul Raj
- Directed by: Rahul Raj
- Starring: Swaminathan; Manohar; Jeeva; Seshu; Monkey Ravi; Udhayakumar; Venkat Raja
- Music by: Arjun Manohar
- Country of origin: India
- Original language: Tamil
- No. of seasons: 1
- No. of episodes: 1

Production
- Producer: Mohana Krishnan
- Running time: 17-19 Minutes
- Production company: Yali Entertainment

Original release
- Network: Netflix
- Release: 20 January 2023

Joking Bad, also known as Lollu Sabha Breaking Bad, is a 2023 Indian Tamil-language parody video written and directed by Rahul Raj for Netflix India. It features comedians from the 2003 series Lollu Sabha, which aired on Star Vijay from 2003 to 2008. The video is a promotional video made by Netflix to promote the American crime drama television series Breaking Bad.

The video was produced by Mohana Krishnan under the banner of Yali Entertainment. The music was composed by Arjun Manohar. It stars Swaminathan, Manohar, Jeeva, Seshu, Monkey Ravi, Udhayakumar and Venkat Raja. The video premiered on Netflix India YouTube channel on 20 January 2023.

== Cast ==
- Swaminathan as Walter Vetrivel
- Manohar as Jessie Rosapayan
- Jeeva as Saul Kavarimaan
- Seshu as Gus Annachi
- Monkey Ravi as Doctor
- Udhayakumar as Hector 'Bell Thatha'
- Venkat Raja as Hank
