= Thillu Mullu (2013 film) =

2013 Indian film by Badri

- Theatrical release poster
- Directed by: Badri
- Written by: Lollu Sabha Balaji (dialogues)
- Screenplay by: Badri
- Story by: Hrishikesh Mukherjee
- Based on: Thillu Mullu
- Produced by: S. Madhan
- Starring: Shiva; Isha Talwar; Prakash Raj
- Cinematography: Laxman Kumar
- Edited by: Praveen K. L. N. B. Srikanth
- Music by: M. S. Viswanathan; Yuvan Shankar Raja
- Production company: Vendhar Movies
- Release date: 14 June 2013
- Running time: 140 minutes
- Country: India
- Language: Tamil

Thillu Mullu (stylised as Thillu Mullu II) is a 2013 Indian Tamil-language comedy film directed and co-written by Badri. It is a remake of the 1981 Tamil film of the same name which was a remake of the 1979 Hindi film Gol Maal. The film stars Shiva and Isha Talwar. Prakash Raj, Kovai Sarala, Soori, Sathyan, Ilavarasu and Manobala played supporting roles. The music was jointly scored by M. S. Viswanathan and Yuvan Shankar Raja who for the first time worked together. While the film's muhurat took place on 24 August, the shooting commenced in September. The film was released on 14 June 2013.

== Plot ==
Pasupathy is a carefree man who is unemployed. He lives with his younger sister Kavitha and house maid Senthamarai who is a part-time black market liquor seller. Kavitha is in love with Pasupathy's close friend Mano which Pasupathy is not aware of. Mano indirectly tries to convey that to him to which he does not understand. Pasupathy's maternal uncle is a lawyer and their caretaker since their parents died. Pasupathy loses his house to a bank on a surety crisis which involved his father. Hence he is compelled to settle in a job. Pasupathy's uncle applies for an opening in his friend's mineral water company for marketing head post. He gives many instructions about the owner Sivagurunathan who is an ardent devotee of Murugan and who is against recommendations. Pasupathy manages to get the job by dressing in a simple Gandhian manner, posing as a Murugan devotee and tells he follows very valuable principles written in the book of Sivagurunathan himself which attracts Sivagurunathan.

Pasupathy one day lies to his boss that his mother got injured and leaves to watch a cricket match. There he engages in revelry with his friends, which is seen by Sivagurunathan as he was present on his friend's invite for a business purpose. Sivagurunathan captures Pasupathy's activities on mobile camera. The next day he issues termination order to Pasupathy. To secure his job, Pasupathy lies that Sivagurunathan has actually seen his identical twin brother Ganguly Kandhan, a karate master who has blue eyes unlike his. Sivagurunathan believes him half-heartedly and yet gives him his job again.

Sivagurunathan has a daughter Janani who learns everything half baked. Her interest turns to learning self-defense skills and tells her father to appoint a master to teach karate. Sivagurunathan calls Pasupathy to send his brother for karate coaching. Pasupathy wears blue contact lens and visits his home and manages to make Sivagurunathan believe he is Ganguly. Pasupathy and Janani had already met when Pasupathy rushed to save Janani from a fire, but Janani ended up saving him. Pasupathy is attracted to Janani and he impresses both Janani and her maternal grandmother. Sivagurunathan meets a bank officer who actually took Pasupathy's house. She tells him that Pasupathy is actually a fraud and she has not met anyone like Ganguly which confuses Sivagurunathan. He appoints a CID officer to follow Pasupathy and find out if he has a brother Ganguly. Pasupathy manages to cheat the officer and make him believe that there are two brothers. But he innocently behaves and submits his and Ganguly's resignation letter to him telling that his mother did not want them to work for a boss who doubts their loyalty. Sivagurunathan says that he would apologise for his doubtful behavior to his mother which creates further trouble for Pasupathy. He rushes home and disguises Senthamarai to act as his mother. Sivagurunathan believes that setup and apologises to Pasupathy's "mother".

Janani falls for Ganguly and she wants him to find if he loves her and she keeps him a test. She wants him to wish for her birthday on the following Tuesday and she will not tell him that she is going to Dubai. Pasupathy tries to get information from Janani's grandmother. He goes to Sivagurunthan and tells Ganguly has gone to Dubai which angers Sivagurunathan as he doubts that Ganguly has gone to impress his daughter. Pasupathy pretends to say that he will go to Dubai and stop his brother and bring back his daughter to which Sivagurunathan accepts. Sivagurunathan plans to marry off his daughter to Pasupathy against Janani's wishes. Pasupathy goes to Dubai and both propose their love. Mano blackmails Pasupathy into letting him marry Kavitha otherwise he would reveal his double act to Sivagurunathan. Pasupathy, with no other option, arranges for their marriage.

Janani leaves her home as she does not want to marry Pasupathy but Ganguly. But upon realising Pasupathy's fraud she angrily beats him. He convinces her by saying all he did is for her sake which cools her. Sivagurunathan misunderstands that Janani is going to marry Ganguly and rushes to stop it but finds that Ganguly is Pasupathy himself. He furiously chases him and Pasupathy runs. In the temple, he bumps into a man who is being forced to marry a girl against his wishes. They concoct a plan to foll Sivagurunathan. After several chases and runs Pasupathy manages to get the chance to marry Janani, but declines as he does not want to marry Janani against his boss' wishes. Sivagurunathan changes his mind and lets them marry.

== Cast ==
- Shiva as Pasupathy/Ganguly Kandhan
- Isha Talwar as Janani
- Prakash Raj as Sivagurunathan
- Kovai Sarala as Senthamarai
- Soori as Mano
- Monisha as Kavitha
- Sathyan as Sathyan/Action King
- Manobala as Sounderrajan
- Ilavarasu as Pasupathy's Uncle
- Sachu as Janani's Grandmother
- Devadarshini as Bank Manager
- Ajay Rathnam as Janani No. 2's Father
- Ashvin Raja as Shiva's friend
- Thalapathy Dinesh
- Swaminathan as Employee
- Kaali Venkat as Shiva's friend
- George Maryan as Detective
- Shyam as Sounderrajan's nephew
- Suhashini as Janani's Friend
- Krishnamoorthy as Santhanam's father
- Manikka Vinayagam as Mano's father
- Santhanam as American groom (special Appearance)
- Venkat Prabhu as himself (special Appearance)
- Sakthi Saravanan as himself (special Appearance)
- Bosskey (special appearance)
- Blaaze as Senthilkumaran (special Appearance)
- Valerie Nobbe (special Appearance)
- Sakthi Chidambaram Himself (special Appearance)
- K. Sivasankar as Choreographer (special Appearance)
- M. S. Viswanathan (special Appearance in song "Thillu Mullu")
- Yuvan Shankar Raja (special Appearance in song "Thillu Mullu")

== Production ==
In July 2012, Shiva confirmed that was he going to do the remake Thillu Mullu that was likely to be produced by KB's daughter Pushpa Kandasamy. Shiva and Vendhar Movies approached Badri to direct the film. Badri said that he ventured into Thillu Mullu with an open mind. "I wanted to make the storyline contemporary. Retaining the characters from the original, I wrote the script to suit today’s generation". The film was launched on 24 August 2012 with a puja at the Image Auditorium at MRC Nagar in Chennai. The team after shooting in Chennai and Hyderabad headed to Dubai and Abu Dhabi to can a few songs and scenes. The song Ragaangal Pathinaru was also shot in Dubai. The shooting was completed in March 2013. After wrapping up the shoot, Badri decided to shoot a music video of the 'Thillu Mullu' remix and convinced the M. S. Viswanathan to appear alongside Yuvan Shankar Raja in the iconic song.

Isha Talwar was roped in to do Madhavi’s role from the original in the film, making her Tamil debut. A non-Tamil speaker, she attempted to learn the language for her role. Prakash Raj reprised the character played by Thengai Srinivasan. Badri stated "the challenge was to cast someone in Thengai Srinivasan’s role. I couldn’t think of anyone other than Prakash Raj". Santhanam reprised the special guest appearance by Kamal Haasan. Bosskey informed that he appeared in the opening sequence "as a fake godman who tries to transform a vertically-challenged person into a normal one".

== Soundtrack ==
Yuvan Shankar Raja and M. S. Viswanathan, the composer of the original Thillu Mullu joined handled the music for the remake together. Two songs from the original — "Thillu Mullu" and "Ragangal Pathinaaru" — were remixed, and two original songs were composed. About the remix, Yuvan said, "I just wanted to give the original theme music a contemporary sound. I have not touched the song 'Ragangal Pathinaaru', which has been sung by singer Karthik." While Viswanathan composed the tunes, Yuvan Shankar Raja orchestrated and recorded them. The audio launch was held on 1 June at the Victoria Hall in Geneva, Switzerland along with the audios of Nalanum Nandhiniyum and Sutta Kadhai.

== Release ==
Thillu Mullu released on 14 June 2013 alongside another comedy film Theeya Velai Seiyyanum Kumaru. It released on 500+ screens worldwide.

=== Critical reception ===
M. Suganth of The Times of India gave 3.5/5 and said, "Much of the credit for this (film) should go to director Badri, whose script clearly suggests that some amount of thought has gone into reworking a cult classic for present-day audiences. Instead of going for a scene by scene remake, he manages to spin newer situations that make it very much a film of our times." In.com said, "Thillu Mullu is good fun while it lasts and enjoyable for Shiva’s antics. Any remake’s success is when it makes us forget the original and this new Thillu Mullu does that well with different situations and a decent cast". Sify said, "Thillu Mullu on the whole is a laugh riot, go have your fun. The film, in the end, is a broad entertainer that plays to the gallery. Keep your expectations in check, and you are sure to come out with a smile." The New Indian Express wrote, "Breezy and fun-filled, Thillu Mullu keeps one entertained for the most part".

On the other hand, S. Saraswathi of Rediff.com wrote that the film "fails to evoke spontaneous laughter and lacks the brilliance and rib-tickling humour of the original." IANS too was critical of the film, "One of the glaring differences between the two versions is the treatment of comedy. While in the original it was sensible and funny, it is loud and commercial in the remake. Despite a few rib-tickling moments between Shiva and Prakash Raj, 'Thillu Mullu' suffers due to extended running time and skewed screenplay." Baradwaj Rangan wrote for The Hindu, "The film, in its earlier avatar, was aided immensely by the eye-rolling eccentricities of 'Thengai' Srinivasan, which is exactly what's needed when the hero is playing it straight. Prakash Raj, here, isn't allowed that kind of leeway – he's given nothing to work with. And things are made worse by a screenplay that moves in fits and starts, never building up steam. Isn't there more to comedy than one-liners?"

=== Box office ===
The film clashed with Theeya Velai Seiyyanum Kumaru but still performed well.

== Controversies ==
Prior to release, Visu, screenwriter of the original Thillu Mullu, filed a civil suit against Vendhar Movies, restraining them from releasing the remake. According to him, the remake had the same screenplay and dialogues as the original version, and the producers did not seek permission to remake his film. However, the court dismissed the case, concluding that the remake did not have the same screenplay as the original version, allowing it to release on 14 June.
