= Rajini Gaang =

Indian Tamil language travel horror-comedy film

- Theatrical release poster
- Directed by: M. Ramesh Baarathi
- Written by: M. Ramesh Baarathi
- Produced by: Rajini Kiishen
- Starring: Rajini Kiishen; Dwivika
- Cinematography: NS Sathish Kumarg
- Edited by: NS Sathish Kumarg
- Production company: Mishri Enterprises
- Release date: 27 November 2025
- Country: India
- Language: Tamil

Rajini Gaang is a 2025 Indian Tamil language travel horror-comedy film written and directed by M. Ramesh Baarathi. The film is produced by Rajini Kiishen under the banner Mishri Enterprises. It stars Rajini Kiishen and Dwivika in major roles. The film was theatrically release on 27 November 2025.

== Cast ==
- Rajini Kiishen as Rajini
- Dwivika as Myna
- Motta Rajendran as Jadamudi Jambulingam
- Munishkanth as Yogi
- Cool Suresh as Thangam
- Kalki Raja as Muthu
- Lollu Sabha Manohar
- Aarya Lakshmi

== Production ==
The film is written and directed by M. Ramesh Baarathi, who also handled the screenplay. It is produced by Rajini Kiishen under Mishri Enterprises. The cinematography is handled by NS Sathish Kumarg and editing by RK Vinoth Kanna.

== Reception ==
Maalai Malar critic stated that "the second half is a thrilling horror film with a mix of comedy."

Hindu Tamil Thisai wrote that "likewise, the ghost itself is a very villainous character and the pranks it plays are a good comedy horror hunt for the fans."
