= Dhilluku Dhuddu =

2016 Indian film by Rambhala

- Theatrical release poster
- Directed by: Rambhala
- Written by: Rambhala
- Produced by: N. Ramasamy
- Starring: Santhanam; Anchal Singh
- Cinematography: Deepak Kumar Padhy
- Edited by: Gopi Krishna
- Music by: Original songs: S. Thaman; Background score: Karthik Raja
- Production company: Sri Thenandal Films
- Distributed by: Mishri Enterprises
- Release date: 7 July 2016
- Running time: 133 minutes
- Country: India
- Language: Tamil
- Box office: ₹12 crore

Dhilluku Dhuddu (lit. 'Money for Guts') is a 2016 Indian Tamil-language comedy horror film directed by Rambhala and produced by Sri Thenandal Films. The film features starring Santhanam and Anchal Singh in the leading roles, while Saurabh Shukla appears in a pivotal role. Featuring music composed by S. Thaman, Dhilluku Dhuddu began production in November 2015 and released on 7 July 2016 to positive response and turned to be successful at box office. The film was later dubbed in Hindi as Raj Mahal 3 in 2017. The film was dubbed in Telugu as Dammunte Sommera in 2018. The film was remade in Kannada in 2019 as Gimmick starring Ganesh.

This is the first film of the Dhilluku Dhuddu film series. A sequel Dhilluku Dhuddu 2 was released in 2019, while a third film, titled DD Returns released in 2023.

== Plot ==
The film starts with a story about a greedy woman who wanted to marry the King. After they got married, they weren't able to live together for a very long time. She departs to live with her former lover by whom she becomes pregnant and gives birth to a boy. The woman secretly takes care of the boy until one day the king becomes aware of him. In anger the King throws the boy into fire. Out of grief, the mother sacrifices her soul to the Satan by hanging herself in front of the house. After hearing this, the King is grief-stricken and falls from his fort and dies. Later the people who lived near the house felt paranormal activities and were killed by the ghost. This news travels to a Buddhist Monk and he offers a visit to Sivankondamalai. There, the Buddhist Monk starts meditating and as he opens his eyes he finds himself in a bungalow and encounters the ghost which threatens to kill him, but the monk traps the ghosts in a magical box and he faints from a concussion. His assistants warn the owner of the bungalow that it is haunted.

The story shifts to present-day Chennai where Kajal (Shanaya) hosts a party for reuniting with her school friends. Then she reveals about her classmate Kumar (Santhanam) who was sent out of school because of Kajal. In the flash back, on Valentine's Day, Kajal gives a card to Kumar and he returns it to her affectionately. This act is seen by a teacher and Kumar is dismissed for it. As the story shifts to the present day, Kumar's uncle Mohan (Karunas) who hasn't paid the due for his truck loses it to the financier (Saurabh Shukla) who is also Kajal's father. As Mohan and Kumar break into the financier's house out of anger, (not knowing that it is Kajal's house) Kajal catches Kumar and hands him over to the police without realizing that he is her childhood crush. The next day, Kumar's father (Anandaraj) standing in front of the police station calls Kajal's father and threatens him to withdraw the case filed on Kumar. Later, Kajal gets Kumar's address and she realizes Kumar is her childhood friend. Simultaneously, Kumar and Mohan plan to kidnap Kajal to teach her a lesson. So, they kidnap her and Kajal reveals herself to Kumar with a kiss and they both fall in love.

Kumar attends a wedding where Kajal is present and as they get personal it is witnessed by Kajal's sister's husband (T.M.Karthik) who misinterprets Kumar as Kapoor family's grandson. When Kajal's father asks Kumar about his family's approval for their union, Kumar brings his family where Kajal's father discovers that they are not a part of the Kapoor family. Kajal's father arranges a marriage for Kajal with another man but it is stopped by Kumar. Defeated, Kajal's father hires a rowdy, Sketch Mani (Rajendran) to kill Kumar. Mani asks Kajal's father to bring Kumar and his family in the name of marriage to the haunted house in Sivankodamalai to murder Kumar and his family and blame it on the ghost. Before they leave, Kumar's mother prays to Lord Muruga and accidentally drops the Vel in the bag and takes it along. But nobody knows that the house is haunted. Mani and his sidekicks enter the house as servants. The magical box containing the spirit still remains in the house.

Later, Mani and his sidekicks start to scare Kajal with the concept of ghost. Mani and his sidekicks try to scare Kumar and Kumar realises that it is just a drama. So Kumar informs this to his family and Kumar asks them to hit anybody in the form of ghost. The monk realizes, that when the moon's light touches the box, the ghost inside it will be released. The monk sends a disciple to get that box, but Kumar's father and Mohan mistake him for an intruder and knock him out. Eventually, the Moon's light touches the box and the ghost inside is released. Kumar learns that Mani and his sidekicks are the ones scaring them. Kumar encounters the real ghost and as the ghost starts to haunt the house, the monk arrives and draws one ghost into the box while another ghost enters Kajal's body out of rage. The monk enters a realm where Kajal's soul is trapped and hears a cry calling out for Kumar. The monk sends Kumar into the realm to control the ghost, but he gets trapped there. Fortunately, Kumar's mother takes the Vel and places it in Kumar's hand. As Kumar gains spiritual confidence, he destroys the ghost with the Vel.

After a few months, Kajal and Kumar get married and are living happily. Mani returns as a ghost and says, 'This is not the end. This is the beginning'.

== Cast ==
- Santhanam as Kumar
- Anchal Singh as Kajal
- Karunas as Mohan
- Anandaraj as Subramaniam, Kumar's father
- Saurabh Shukla as Kuppal Ji: Kajal's father
- Rajendran as Sketch Mani
- Chavi Sharma as Kajal's niece
- T. M. Karthik as Kajal's brother-in-law
- Ganeshkar as Sketch Mani's assistant
- Mayilsamy as waiter
- Singamuthu as councillor
- P. V. Chandramouli
- Lollu Sabha Manohar as Kumar's neighbor
- Eesan Sujatha as Kumar's mother
- Baby Swaksha
- Lollu Sabha Maaran as Teacher
- Ashok Raja in a special appearance in the song "Sivan Magan Da"

== Production ==
In May 2014, Santhanam and Rambala, who had previously directed the actor for the spoof serial Lollu Sabha, planned to collaborate for a film titled Dhilluku Dhuddu. The venture was later postponed to allow Santhanam to finish work on Muruganand's Inimey Ippadithan (2015) first. In early 2015, Rambala then announced that he would make the film with Shiva and Nandita, but the project did not develop.

Following the release of Inimey Ippadithaan, Santhanam began pre-production on his work with Rambala during July 2015 and sported a new look for the project. The film began production in November 2015, with newcomer Shanaya and Hindi film actor Saurabh Shukla revealed to be a part of the cast. Prior to the release of the film, the producer of the proposed venture starring Shiva came forward and submitted an application to court stating that Rambala had made Dhilluku Dhuddu from the script of the film he had earlier approved. Sarbudeen of Paper Flight Pictures argued that Rambala had unceremoniously left the project and sought to stop Dhilluku Dhuddu release, which he failed to do.

== Soundtrack ==
The music was composed and performed by S. Thaman. The soundtrack was released on 24 June 2016, and consists of three tracks.

Dhilluku Dhuddu

Soundtrack album by S. Thaman
- Released: 24 June 2016
- Genre: Feature film soundtrack
- Length: 11:03
- Language: Tamil

S. Thaman chronology
| Sarrainodu (2016) | Dhilluku Dhuddu (2016) | Chuttalabbai (2016) |

Track listing
| No. | Title | Lyrics | Artist(s) | Length |
|---|---|---|---|---|
| 1. | "Dhilluku Dhuddunuthan" | Viveka | Deepak, MM Monisha | 03:32 |
| 2. | "Kaanamal Pona Kadhal" | Madhan Karky | Nivas, Sanjana Kalmanje | 03:17 |
| 3. | "Sivan Magan Da" | Kirithaya | Saisharan, Deepak, Nivas, Solar Sai, Naveen, Sandhya | 04:14 |
| Total length: | | | | 11:03 |

== Box office ==
The movie got a good start at the box office and turned out to be very successful earning ₹120 million in its four-day weekend in Tamil Nadu.
