= Bestie (film) =

2022 Tamil language horror film

- Official poster
- Directed by: Ranga
- Produced by: R. Sarathi Raja
- Starring: Ashok Kumar Yashika Aannand
- Cinematography: R. Anand
- Edited by: Ram Gopi
- Music by: J. V.
- Production company: RS Cinema
- Release date: 8 July 2022
- Running time: 137 mins
- Country: India
- Language: Tamil

Bestie is a 2022 Indian Tamil-language horror film directed by Ranga Kumar and starring Ashok Kumar and Yashika Aannand. It was released on 8 July 2022.

== Plot ==
Ashok and Yashika embarked on a vacation to a secluded farmhouse. When their car broke down, they managed to reach the destination despite the setback. During their stay, an electrician, food delivery boy, plumber, and watchman repeatedly interrupted Yashika and Ashok, disrupting their intended relaxation. Eventually, it was revealed that these individuals were Yashika's family members seeking revenge for the gang rape and murder of Yashika's sister, Priyanka, perpetrated by Ashok and his friends, including Jeeva. Yashika and her family members executed their premeditated plan, systematically targeting and killing Ashok and his friends. In the aftermath, the original watchman, who was on leave during the murders, filed a complaint at the police station. However, the Sub-Inspector stunned the watchman by revealing that the suspects he identified were already deceased before the murders occurred.

== Cast ==
- Ashok Kumar as Ashok
- Yashika Aannand as Yashika
- Vasu Vikram as Watchman
- Bayilvan Ranganathan as M. Anbazhagan SI
- Sathyan
- Lollu Sabha Maaran as Madhan
- Lollu Sabha Seshu as Meiyappan
- Charmila
- Ambani Shankar as Shankar
- Lollu Sabha Jeeva as Jeeva in a guest appearance
- Ashwini Chandrashekar as Priyanka in a guest appearance

== Production ==
The production of the film began before Yashika suffered a serious injury in June 2021.

== Reception ==
The film was released on 8 July 2022. A critic from The Times of India wrote "The film starts off as a horror thriller and becomes a revenge drama towards the climax. There are many twists in the second half, but they generate little interest as the director fails to realise that viewers would be interested in the post-interval sequences only if the first half is bearable, which is not the case here". A reviewer from Dina Thanthi called the film "predictable". India Herald critic noted that the film is "A worst every movie made".
