= Cool Suresh =

Indian actor (born 1977)

- Born: Suresh; 3 November 1977 (age 48); Mylapore, Tamil Nadu, India
- Occupations: Actor; comedian
- Years active: 2001–present

Cool Suresh is an Indian actor who has played supporting and background characters in Tamil-language films.

== Career ==
Suresh made his debut with Chocolate (2001) where he portrayed a college rowdy. He played similar roles in Kaakha Kaakha (2003) and Devathaiyai Kanden (2005). He acted as a playboy in Thiruda Thirudi. He went on to play comedic roles in films such as Singam Puli (2011).

He made his lead film debut with the horror-comedy Padithavudan Kilithu Vidavum (2018). He will also play the lead role in Chithirame Solladi, an investigative thriller. Suresh was to producer a film starring Julie of Bigg Boss Tamil fame and star in T. Rajendar's Indraya Kaadhal Da; however, all three films never entered production.

== Personal life ==
Suresh is a paternal cousin, self-proclaimed fan and sympathizer of Silambarasan and has been seen accompanying T. Rajendar his paternal uncle during political rallies of the All India Latchiya Dravida Munnetra Kazhagam. He has been the subject of criticism and memes online.

== Filmography ==
List of film credits
Year	Title	Role	Notes
2001	Chocolate	College Rowdy	
2002	Shree	Rowdy	
2002	Kadhal Azhivathillai	Simbhu's friend	Uncredited
2003	Kaakha Kaakha	Rogue	
2003	Thiruda Thirudi	Mukesh	
2003	Alai	Aathi's friend	
2004	Kuthu	College Rowdy	Uncredited
2004	Aaytha Ezhuthu	Inba's friend	Uncredited
2004	Machi	Narayanan's son	
2004	M. Kumaran Son of Mahalakshmi	Rowdy	
2005	Devathaiyai Kanden	Rowdy	
2005	Bambara Kannaley		
2006	Paramasivan	Witness	
2007	Deepavali	Billu's friend	
2007	Pachaikili Muthucharam	Dass	
2007	Nee Naan Nila	Harish	
2007	Thottal Poo Malarum	Ravi's friend	
2008	Kuselan	Nagercoil's Nagaraj's assistant	
2009	Padikkadavan	Veerapandi's henchman	
2009	Mariyadhai	Waiter	
2009	Kandhakottai	Siva's friend	
2009	Balam		
2010	Maanja Velu	Lover boy	
2010	Moscowin Kavery	Passenger	
2010	Kalloori Kalangal	Bus conductor	
2010	Agam Puram	Thiru's friend	
2011	Singam Puli	Ashok Kumar's friend	
2011	Kandaen	Rowdy	
2011	Venghai	Selvam's friend	
2011	Puli Vesham	Govindan's henchman	
2011	Naan Sivanagiren	Local goon in bus	
2012	Vinayaga	Auto driver	
2012	Muppozhudhum Un Karpanaigal	Henchman	
2012	Kadhal Pisase	College Rowdy	
2012	Aachariyangal		
2012	Thiruthani	Henchman	
2013	Kanna Laddu Thinna Aasaiya	Kolaveri David's henchman	
2013	Ya Ya	Sehwag's assistant	
2014	Venmegam		
2014	Vallavanukku Pullum Aayudham	Servant	
2014	Vellaikaara Durai	Varadhan's henchman	
2015	Nannbenda	Sivakolundhu's friend	
2015	Inimey Ippadithan		
2015	Vaalu		
2015	Savaale Samaali	Koothu actor	
2016	Narathan		
2016	Ner Mugam		
2017	Enakku Vaaitha Adimaigal	Rishi	
2017	Si3	Divorcee	
2017	Senjittale En Kadhala		
2017	Pichuva Kaththi		
2017	Theru Naaigal	Maruthamuthu's assistant	
2018	Gulaebaghavali	Car driver	
2018	Padithavudan Kilithu Vidavum		
2019	Thodraa		
2019	Mudivilla Punnagai		
2019	Thavam		
2020	Biskoth	Kidnapper	
2020	Routtu		
2022	Theal		
2022	Kichi Kichi		
2022	My Dear Lisa	Maari	
2023	Bakasuran	Cool Raja (pimp)	
2023	DD Returns	Money stealer	
2023	Kick	Shooting spot crew member	
2023	Chandramukhi 2	House servant	
2023	80s Buildup	English thief	
2024	Vadakkupatti Ramasamy	Dhanarasu	
2024	Inga Naan Thaan Kingu	Umesh	
2024	Thozhar CheGuevara	Chinnaswamy	
2025	Otha Votu Muthaiya		
2025	Enai Sudum Pani	Mappillai	
2025	Paramasivan Fathima	"Dubai" Raja	
2025	Pagal Kanavu		
2025	Rajini Gaang	Thangam	
2026	Kadhal Kadhai Sollava	Mechanic	

=== Television ===
- Uravugal (2009 - 2012)
- Athu Ithu Yethu (2012)
- Genes (2018)
- Thaaya Tharama
- Thillu Mullu (2019)
- Ilakkiya (2022)
- Bigg Boss Tamil 7 (2023) - Evicted Day 76
