= Idiot (2022 film) =

2022 film by Rambhala

- Theatrical release poster
- Directed by: Rambhala
- Written by: Rambhala
- Produced by: Sundar Arumugam
- Starring: Shiva; Nikki Galrani; Akshara Gowda
- Cinematography: Raja Bhattacharjee
- Edited by: Gingee Madhavan
- Music by: Vikram Selva
- Production company: Screen Scene Media Entertainment
- Distributed by: 7G Films
- Release date: 1 April 2022
- Country: India
- Language: Tamil

Idiot is a 2022 Indian Tamil-language parody comedy horror film directed by Rambhala and produced by Screen Scene Media Entertainment Pvt Ltd. The film stars Shiva, Nikki Galrani, and Akshara Gowda. The music was composed by Vikram Selva with cinematography by Raja Bhattacharjee and editing by Gingee Madhavan. The film was initially planned for release in theatres in September 2021 but was postponed due to COVID-19 pandemic. The film was finally released in theatres on 1 April 2022. The film received mixed to negative reviews.

== Plot ==
A royal family is betrayed and tricked to death by hiding in a ventless-abditory by two subordinates, Sethupathi and Senathipathi. The sole survivor is the family's infant son, whom Sethupathi wants to kill, but Senathipathi convinces him to spare.

Many decades later, Sethupathi's descendant, Chinnarasu, lives in a village. He is the son of Raasu Gounder, the incompetent head of the village panchayat, and his long-suffering wife, Parimalam. The only son of the family, his father despises Chinnarasu, who dotes on his daughters. After Chinnarasu disobeys his father and competes in a kabaddi game, they throw him out of the house. Chinnarasu returns drunk and belligerent and demands a share of his ancestral property from his father. Raasu Gounder spitefully gives him the deeds to the royal family's palace that Sethupathi killed. It is a place where they warned the family never to go to. While travelling there, Chinnarasu had an accident, becoming a delusional amnesiac.

Meanwhile, Senathipathi's son runs a psychiatric hospital named after Senathipathi. Senathipathi's granddaughter, Sumitha, works as a psychiatrist at the hospital. After his accident, Chinnarasu is admitted to Sumitha's hospital and named Paandi. As Paandi, he befriends fellow patient Burfi and falls in love with Sumitha, who sees him only as a harmless but delusional patient.

One day, Sumitha's father gives her a ring that once belonged to her grandfather. After Sumitha's mother puts the ring on her finger while asleep, Sumitha is strangled at night by the ghosts of the royal family her grandfather helped to murder until the ring slips off her finger. The next day, someone steals the jewellery from Sumitha's bag by the attendant of a sinister female patient. But Paandi takes it from her soon after, believing that the ring is an engagement ring Sumitha has bought for him. The ring is then confiscated from Paandi by a nurse and once again stolen, reaching the female patient. The female patient bargains with the ghosts, revealing herself as a sorceress named Neelakandi. She tells them that she will help them take revenge against Sethupathi's and Senathipathi's descendants in return for helping her resurrect her dead lover by sacrificing Sumitha on the night of an eclipse.

Meanwhile, Thiru Don Sekar and his gang decide on a plan. They are going to kidnap Sumitha and then demand ransom from her father. On the eclipse night, Paandi and Burfi hide in Sumitha's car to smuggle themselves out of the hospital. When Sumitha leaves the hospital, Thiru Don and his gang successfully snatch her but accidentally make their ransom demand to Paandi and Burfi instead of Sumitha's father. They drop off an unconscious Sumitha for the ransom at the drop site but are angered to find the "ransom" in a rubbish pile. When they return to look for Sumitha, they see Neelakandi's ghost army kidnapping her and taken to the royal family's palace. But they believe the ghosts are another gang of kidnappers in disguise.

Thus, the paths of Neelakandi, the dead royal family, Paandi and Burfi and the kidnappers coincide at the palace. When the kidnappers realise that the ghosts are dead, their attempts to escape the chateau and hilarity ensue due to Paandi's and Burfi's delusions and lack of concern about the ghosts. Meanwhile, Raasu Gounder and Parimalam visit the castle and are offended by their son's refusal to acknowledge them. At the same time, Sumitha's father enlists a priest to help rescue her from the palace.

Upon their arrival, the dead king recognizes Sumitha's father as his youngest son, and the family switches sides to rescue Sumitha. The priest sets up a ritual to protect Sumitha during the eclipse, but Burfi destroys it and misunderstands it as Paandi's wedding, which no one invited him to. As Neelakandi begins the ritual, the priest empowers Paandi to fight against her evil powers and then tricks Neelakandi into believing that Paandi is the reincarnation of her dead lover. When Neelakandi embraces Paandi, the priest releases the soul of Neelakandi's lover, who is enraged by her apparent betrayal and kills her. The eclipse ends soon after, and the priest revives Sumitha and rescues her.

== Cast ==
- Shiva as Chinnarasu, Paandi and Thor (Special Appearance)
- Nikki Galrani as Sumitha
- Akshara Gowda as Neelagandi
- Anandaraj as Raasu Gounder
- Urvashi as Parimalam
- Ravi Mariya as Thiru Don Sekar
- Redin Kingsley as Burfi
- Mayilsamy as Aandavar
- Singamuthu as Chinnarasu's uncle
- K. Sivasankar as Vijayasimha Reddy aka Semmaloor Jameen
- R. N. R. Manohar as Sumitha's father
- Crane Manohar as Thambikottai
- Syamantha Kiran as Chinnarasu's sister
- Maanas Chavali as Sethupathy
- Vijay Venkatesan as Senathipathi
- Bipin
- Bava Lakshmanan

== Production ==
The shooting of the film was started on 9 November 2020 with the majority of the portions in the first schedule was shot in Tenkasi and the remaining portions in Chennai. The final schedule was commenced in Pollachi by the end of December 2020. The team wrapped up shooting for the film in February 2021.

== Soundtrack ==
The soundtrack is composed by Vikram Selva.

Idiot

Soundtrack album by Vikram Selva
- Released: 2022
- Genre: Soundtrack
- Length: 2:34
- Label: Think Music India
- Producer: Vikram Selva

Vikram Selva chronology
| Adhibar (2015) | Idiot (2022) |

Track listing
| No. | Title | Lyrics | Singer(s) | Length |
|---|---|---|---|---|
| 1. | "Oru Paarvaizhala" | Mani Amudhan | Anand Aravindakshan | 2:34 |

== Release ==
The trailer of the film was released on 25 April 2021. The film was initially planned for release in theatres on 17 September 2021, but got postponed due to unforeseen situations. The film was released in theatres on 1 April 2022.

Within one month after its theatrical release, the film had its television premiere on Kalaignar TV on 1 May 2022.

== Reception ==
Idiot received generally negative reviews from critics. Logesh Balachandran of The Times of India gave the film 2.0 out of 5 stars and said, "Right from the beginning, the film is not sure of its stance, swaying between spoof and comedy of errors... [making it] a tedious watch for viewers..." Navein Darshan of Cinema Express gave the film 1.5 out of 5 stars, and highlights the poor representation of mental illness in the film as a major issue, saying, "Scenes like these are highly insulting to both the LGBTQIA+ community and people suffering from mental illness."

However Maalai Malar critic noted that " As usual, the story takes place in old bungalows that are suitable for ghost films, so there is not much interesting."
