= Devil's Double Next Level =

2025 Indian film by S. Prem Anand

- Theatrical release poster
- Directed by: S. Prem Anand
- Written by: S. Prem Anand
- Screenplay by: S. Prem Anand; E. Murugan Eswara Moorthy; G. L. Sethu Raman
- Story by: S. Prem Anand; E. Murugan Eswara Moorthy; G. L. Sethu Raman
- Produced by: Venkat Boyanapalli; Arya
- Starring: Santhanam; Selvaraghavan; Gautham Vasudev Menon; Geethika Tiwary
- Cinematography: Deepak Kumar Padhy
- Edited by: Bharath Vikraman
- Music by: OfRo
- Production company: The Show People; Niharika Entertainment
- Release date: 16 May 2025
- Running time: 133 minutes
- Country: India
- Language: Tamil

Devil's Double Next Level (previously known as DD Next Level) is a 2025 Indian Tamil-language satirical comedy horror film written and directed by S. Prem Anand. Produced by The Show People and Niharika Entertainment, the film stars Santhanam, Selvaraghavan, Gautham Vasudev Menon and Geethika Tiwary in the lead roles. It is the fourth instalment in the Dhilluku Dhuddu film series.

Devil's Double Next Level was released on 16 May 2025 in theaters to mixed reviews from critics.

== Plot ==
=== "Hitchcock" Irudhayaraj ===
The film begins with It's Prashanth, a movie reviewer, receiving a special show ticket for "Hitchcock Iruthyaraj," a film directed by Hitchcock Iruthyaraj himself. At the Cinema Paradise theater, Prashanth finds himself alone and soon becomes trapped. He witnesses Hitchcock Iruthyaraj brutally killing movie reviewers who gave poor reviews. The film intertwines with the killings, and by the end, Hitchcock Iruthyaraj and his assistant are shown to be killed, with Prashanth being trapped and killed by Hitchcock's spirit.

=== Who is Kissa 47 ? ===
Krishnamoorthy "Kissa 47," a sharp-tongued YouTube film reviewer, known for his honest critiques, receives an invitation to a private screening of Hitchcock Iruthyaraj's latest film, "DD Next Level." Kissa visits the dilapidated theater, suspects something is off, and escapes. However, Kissa's family and girlfriend, Aasai Harshini, unaware of the danger, attend the screening. Kissa rushes to rescue them and finds himself trapped with two other reviewers, "Veen Pechu" Babu and "Veen Pechu" Mani, thrown into the film by Hitchcock Iruthyaraj's spirit.

=== DD Next Level: Chapter 1 - Mask Killer ===
In the film, Kissa finds himself trapped in a haunted cruise ship, and a masked assailant kills Mani. Iruthyaraj appears outside the screen, challenging Kissa and Babu to survive until the end credits roll to escape the film and return to reality. Kissa's family members, including his father Auto Baskar (now Captain McDonald), mother Devaki (now Shilpa, a Telugu-speaking actress), and younger sister Devi (now Maya, the film's female lead actress), no longer recognize him. Kissa meets the film's lead actor, Ragavan, and his assistant, Gopal, but they don't understand him. Iruthyaraj hints that Kissa's mother, Shilpa, is destined to be killed according to the film's script. To save his mother, Kissa directs the masked killer to himself and gets beaten unconscious.

=== DD Next Level: Chapter 2 - Mystic Island ===
The cruise ship passengers move to a nearby island, Cuckoo's Nest, owned by Robert. Kissa and Babu hear the voice of Aasai Harshini, now known as Jessica Sebastian, and are shocked to see her portrait in the resort. Kissa learns that Jessica Sebastian went missing years ago, and the island is said to be haunted by her spirit. A tribesman hints to Kissa and Babu about a diary hidden on the third floor of the resort, which might reveal ways to escape the dangers. Before they can investigate, the other passengers, including Maya, Shilpa, Gopal, and Arumugam, enter the haunted room, fearing spirits. Meanwhile, Ragavan suspects the resort owners are cannibals and holds them at gunpoint, but the masked killer, revealed to be Robert, apprehends Ragavan. Robert chases Maya, Shilpa, Gopal, and Arumugam, but Kissa helps them escape. Kissa ventures to retrieve the diary from a deep pit with the help of a rope. However, as soon as he opens the diary, the spirit of Jessica Sebastian is unleashed. The witchcraft woman orders Robert to fetch Jessica's diary to destroy her soul permanently.

Despite the diary changing hands multiple times, Kissa eventually retrieves it. With the diary, Kissa plans to travel to the past to prevent Jessica's death and the curse that haunts the island. As Captain reads the diary, the flashback reveals Jessica's story. She had purchased the island and resort, only to discover Robert's activities of killing humans as sacrifices to their forefathers. Before Robert could kill her, Kissa and Babu travel to the past and safeguard her, killing Robert and his men in the process. With the curse lifted, Kissa rejoices, thinking they can now safely return to the real world. However, Iruthyaraj reveals a twist: by saving Jessica, Kissa has inadvertently brought back to life the man-eating cannibals that Jessica's spirit had previously killed. Kissa asks Iruthyaraj how to escape the trap, and Iruthyaraj replies that Kissa must fight them off to safeguard his family.

=== DD Next Level: Chapter 3 - Haunted Factory ===
Kissa, along with Babu, Ragavan, Arumugam, Jessica, and Gopal, embarks on a mission to rescue his family from the cannibals. As they fight the four cannibals, the film's rolling title symbolizes their limited time. Kissa and Ragavan kill one cannibal, and the Captain's idea sets a room full of traps, but Arumugam and Gopal get caught and die. Kissa and Babu use a huge metal ball to kill another cannibal, and a bomb blast kills the third one. However, Babu sacrifices himself, considering his wastrel nature in the real world. With everyone's help, Kissa finally kills the last cannibal. But just as they think they've won, the four cannibals return to life, hinting at a sequel, "DD Never Ends". A black hole appears, sucking Kissa's family and girlfriend into it. Iruthyaraj laughs, expecting Kissa to continue the cycle. However, Kissa outsmarts him by killing Ragavan, ensuring there's no hero to continue the sequel.

=== 'E'ffort 'N'ever 'D'ies ===
Kissa tells Iruthyaraj that reviews don't define a film's quality, and finally Iruthyaraj sets Kissa free, and he returns to the real world, where his family is safe. The film ends with fake and paid reviewers entering the theater.

== Cast ==
- Santhanam as Krishnamoorthy "Kissa 47"
- Selvaraghavan as "Hitchcock" Iruthyaraj
- Gautham Vasudev Menon as Ragavan, the film's male lead
- Geethika Tiwary in a dual role as
  - Aasai Harshini, Kissa's girlfriend
  - Jessica Sebastian, a vengeful spirit (Voice dubbed by Ashmini Balakrishnan)
- Nizhalgal Ravi in a dual role as
  - Auto Baskar, Kissa's father
  - Captain Mc Donald
- Kasthuri Shankar in a dual role as
  - Devaki, Kissa's mother
  - Shilpa, a Telugu-speaking actress
- Yashika Aannand in a dual role as
  - Devi, Kissa's younger sister
  - Maya, the film's female lead
- Rajendran as "Veen Pechu" Babu
- Lollu Sabha Maaran as "All Language" Arumugam
- Redin Kingsley as Gopal, Ragavan's assistant
- It's Prashanth as himself
- Raveendran as a producer
- Ganesh as "Veen Pechu" Mani
- Varshini Venkat as Lily
- Chamanthy Priya
- Reehana
- Bayilvan Ranganathan as himself
- Filmi Craft Arun as himself
- Vera Level Cinema Karthik
- Ottran Durai
- Gopikumar M
- Rudra Kamal

== Production ==
In 2024, Arya and Santhanam announced the sequel of DD Returns (2023) on 7 July 2024, written and directed by S. Prem Anand. The film is produced by Venkat Boyanapalli under his Niharika Entertainment and presented by Arya under his The Show People banner. The film was officially announced on 20 January 2025, titled as DD Next Level. The film also stars Gautham Vasudev Menon, Selvaraghavan, Geethika Tiwary, Yashika Aannand, Kasthuri Shankar, Nizhalgal Ravi, Maaran and Rajendran in key roles. The technical team consists of music composed by OfRo, cinematography by Dipak Kumar Padhy, editing by Bharath Vikraman and art direction by AR Mohan. On 28 April 2025, during the trailer announcement, the film's title was revealed to be Devil's Double Next Level.

=== Filming ===
Principal photography began in early-July 2024 and was wrapped in January 2025. On 13 February 2025, it was officially announced that the dubbing process had begun.

== Music ==
Devil's Double Next Level

Soundtrack album by OfRo
- Genre: Feature film soundtrack
- Language: Tamil
- Label: Think Music
- Producer: OfRo

OfRo chronology
Rebel (2024)	Devil's Double Next Level (2025)

Singles from Devil's Double Next Level
- 1. "Kissa 47" Released: 26 February 2025; 2. "Cinemakaran" Released: 4 May 2025

The soundtrack and background is composed by OfRo in his second collaboration with Santhanam and S. Prem Anand after DD Returns (2023). The first single "Kissa 47" was released on 26 February 2025. The second single "Cinemakaran" was released on 4 May 2025.

Track listing
No.	Title	Lyrics	Singer(s)	Length
1.	"Kissa 47"	Kelithee	OfRo	2:51
2.	"Arey Bapre"	Pa.Vijay	Punya Selva, Rockzane	2:36
3.	"Cinemakaran"	Thamizh Aadhavan	Vangal Pulla Vicky	2:16
4.	"Gada Gada"	Gana Francis	Gana Francis, Urban Thozha	1:23
5.	"Bro Bro Bro"	Santhanam	Santhanam	1:17
6.	"Mella Saav"	Gana Francis	OfRo	1:11
Total length:				10:54

== Marketing ==
The film's trailer was released on 30 April 2025.

== Release ==
=== Theatrical ===
Devil's Double Next Level was released theatrically on 16 May 2025.

=== Home media ===
The film began streaming on ZEE5 from 13 June 2025.

== Reception ==
Akshay Kumar of Cinema Express gave 3/5 stars and wrote "Self-awareness is the biggest strength of DD Next Level and it is also a risk taken by the director.[...] The screenplay is largely breezing through one humour trope after the other. There are well-written, enjoyable and elaborate sequences that effectively overshadow the wafer-thin plotline of the story." Abhinav Subramanian of The Times of India rated with 2/5 stars and wrote "When the most memorable parts of your comedy are the awkward silences where the jokes were supposed to be, it’s a clear sign that the script might have needed a few more levels of refinement." Janani K of India Today rated with 2/5 stars and wrote "Barring a few fun gags, the film is replete with outdated fart jokes." Latha Srinivasan of Hindustan Times rated with 1/5 stars and wrote "Fails to capitalise on its unique premise of film reviewers, devolving into a confusing mix of horror and comedy." Bhuvanesh Chandar of The Hindu stated "After a hilariously meta first half, S Prem Anand’s horror comedy turns into a dreadful mess."

== Controversy ==
The makers took down the "Srinivasa Govinda" and "Govind Govinda" chants from the "Kissa 47" song after receiving criticism and condemnations for their inclusion in the song. Earlier, Santhanam and Niharika Entertainments received a defamation notice from Tirumala Tirupati Devasthanams member Bhanuprakash Reddy, who demanded that the song be taken down or that they pay ₹100 crore (US$10 million) in damages. Furthermore, Kiran Royal, the in-charge of the Janasena Party, filed a complaint against the filmmakers with the Tirupati One Town Police Station, claiming that they had offended Hindu feelings and harmed the deity's reputation.
