= Vaanaran =

Indian Tamil-language film

- Theatrical release poster
- Directed by: Sriram Padmanabhan
- Produced by: Rajesh Padmanabhan; Sujatha Rajesh
- Starring: Bijesh Nagesh; A. Akshya; Baby Varshini; Jeeva Thangavel
- Cinematography: Niran Chander
- Edited by: Vithu Jeeva
- Music by: Shajahan
- Production company: Orange Pictures
- Release date: 8 August 2025
- Running time: 92 minutes
- Country: India
- Language: Tamil

Vaanaran is a 2025 Indian Tamil-language film written and directed by Sriram Padmanabhan. The film stars Bijesh Nagesh, A. Akshya and Baby Varshini in the lead roles. It is produced by Rajesh Padmanabhan and Sujatha Rajesh under the banner of Orange Pictures.

== Cast ==
- Bijesh Nagesh
- A. Akshya
- Baby Varshini
- Jeeva Thangavel
- Adesh Bala
- Lollu Sabha Udhaya
- Nanjil Vijayan
- Deepa Shankar

== Production ==
The film is written and directed by Sriram Padmanabhan, while the technical team consists of Niran Chander as the cinematographer, Vithu Jeeva as the editor and Shajahan as the music director.

== Reception ==
Dina Thanthi critic wrote that "Director Sriram Padmanabhan has shed light on how everything changes when ordinary people face insurmountable problems. The 'climax' is heart-wrenching"

Dinakaran critic stated that "Shahjahan's music is excellent. 'Do' Sriram Padmanabhan has written and directed it well, bringing the lives of those who wear the guise of God to our eyes."
