= Biskoth =

2020 film

- Theatrical release poster
- Directed by: R. Kannan
- Written by: R. Kannan
- Based on: Bedtime Stories by Matt Lopez and Tim Herlihy
- Produced by: R. Kannan
- Starring: Santhanam
- Cinematography: N. Shanmuga Sundaram
- Edited by: R. K. Selva
- Music by: Radhan
- Production companies: Masala Pix; M.K.R.P. Productions
- Distributed by: Trident Arts
- Release date: 14 November 2020
- Running time: 104 minutes
- Country: India
- Language: Tamil

Biskoth (transl. Biscuit) is a 2020 Indian Tamil-language parody film based on the American comedy titled Bedtime Stories. Biskoth is written, produced and directed by R. Kannan, under the banner Masala Pix. The film stars Santhanam in a quadruple role alongside, Tara Alisha while Sowcar Janaki, Anandaraj, Motta Rajendran and Aadukalam Naren play supporting roles. The music for the film was composed by Radhan, while the cinematography and editing were handled by Shanmuga Sundaram and RK Selva, respectively. The plot was heavily inspired on 2008 American fantasy comedy film Bedtime Stories.

The film was released in theatres in India on 14 November 2020, The film received mixed reviews, who appreciated the performance of Santhanam, and the humor, but were criticized for the narration and Kannan's direction and screenplay.

== Synopsis ==
Raja is the son of a small-time biscuit maker, Dharmarajan. Dharmarajan has a big-time dream to turn his business into a huge brand and make his son, Raja, the head of the company. Unfortunately, Dharmarajan passes away, leaving his friend Narasimhan to take over the reins of the business.

Later, Raja becomes a worker for the same company and becomes close to the new occupant, Janaki, in a nursing home. She has a habit of narrating stories. Raja realizes that the myths that she tells him are coming true in his real life. What happens to Raja's dream and how her tales affected his life form the rest of the story.

== Cast ==
- Santhanam in a quadruple role as
  - Rajasimmha
  - Raja
  - Simmha
  - Baabubali
- Tara Alisha as Dr. Anitha
- Swathi Muppala as Laya
- Sowcar Janaki as Janaki Patti
- Anandaraj as Narasimhan
- Rajendran as Mottappa
- Aadukalam Naren as Dharmarajan
- Lollu Sabha Manohar as Manohar
- Bharath Reddy as Ganesh
- Maha Gandhi as Rowdy
- Sivasankar as Old man
- K. Bujji Babu as Old man
- Jeeva as David Billa
- Cool Suresh as Kidnapper
- Raja Elangovan
- Maaran as Ambulance driver
- Easter
- V. V. Giri as Old man
- Elango

== Production ==
Principal photography of the film started in September 2019 coinciding special occasion of Ganesh Chaturthi. The film was shot in Chennai and Hyderabad. The post production of the film was delayed due to COVID-19 pandemic and resumed after government announcement on 11 May 2020.

== Soundtrack ==
This music is composed by Radhan and released by Think Music India.

Biskoth

Soundtrack album by Radhan
- Released: 2020
- Venue: Chennai
- Studio: Masala Pix
- Genre: Feature film soundtrack
- Length: 14:25
- Language: Tamil
- Label: Think Music India
- Producer: Radhan

Radhan chronology
Varmaa (2020)	Biskoth (2020)	Jathi Ratnalu (2021)

Tamil Track-List
No.	Title	Singer(s)	Length
1.	"Baby Song"	Yogi Sekar	3:56
2.	"Vettrimunai Vel Piditha"	Bamba Bhagyaraj	2:17
3.	"Chinna Pillai Poley (1950's Ride)"	Poornima, Mujib Rahman	4:19
4.	"Baby Song Redux Version"	MC Chetan	3:52
Total length:			14.25

== Release ==
As per the government guidelines during the Pandemic COVID-19 situation, on 14 November 2020, the film got released in the theatres. It was the first Tamil movie which was added in cinemas after long Pandemic COVID-19 in the country. After two weeks in cinemas, Biskoth movie was released on over the top (OTT) platforms. On Simply South app, it was released on 26 November 2020 while on ZEE Plex it was launched on 1st week in December 2020.
