= DD Returns =

2023 Indian horror comedy film

- Theatrical release poster
- Directed by: S. Prem Anand
- Written by: S. Prem Anand
- Produced by: C. Ramesh Kumar
- Starring: Santhanam; Surbhi
- Cinematography: Deepak Kumar Padhy
- Edited by: N. B. Srikanth
- Music by: OfRo
- Production company: RK Entertainment
- Release date: 28 July 2023
- Running time: 125 minutes
- Country: India
- Language: Tamil
- Box office: est. ₹41.28 crore

DD Returns (expanded as Dare Demons Returns) is a 2023 Indian Tamil-language comedy horror film written and directed by debutant S. Prem Anand, produced by C Ramesh Kumar under RK Entertainment. The film stars an ensemble cast with Santhanam and Surbhi in the lead roles and Redin Kingsley, Maaran and Pradeep Rawat (in his final Tamil film) in supporting roles. The film is a stand-alone sequel to Dhilluku Dhuddu 2 and the third film in the Dhilluku Dhuddu film series. The music is composed by OfRo, with the cinematography and editing handled by Dipak Kumar Padhy and N. B. Srikanth. The film was released theatrically on 28 July 2023. It received positive reviews from critics and became commercially successful at the box office.

== Plot ==
A group of friends hides a bag full of money and jewels in a haunted bungalow to ditch the police. When they try to retrieve the bag, a ghost makes them play a survival game

== Cast ==
- Santhanam as Sathish
- Surbhi as Sofia
- FEFSI Vijayan as Francis Anbarasu
- Pradeep Rawat as Fernandes
- Redin Kingsley as Benny
- Lollu Sabha Maaran as Ravi
- Masoom Shankar as Clara
- Manasvi Kottachi as Rachel (Clara's Daughter, Fernandes Grand Daughter)
- Rajendran as Professor
- Thangadurai as "Blade" Babu
- Munishkanth as Bheem
- Bipin as Kulanthai
- Sai Dheena as Mathi
- Saidai Sethu as Paambu
- Jeevitha as Sofia’s mother
- Deepa Shankar as Mallika
- Cool Suresh as Money stealer
- Swaminathan as Church Father
- Lollu Sabha Manohar as Local Manager Manohar
- Praveen Devasagayam
- Madan Gowri as himself (special appearance)
- Sandy (special appearance in "French Kuthu")

== Production ==
In mid-2019, Rambhala announced his intentions of making a third part to his Dhilluku Dhuddu film series featuring Santhanam in the lead role and was referred to as Dhilluku Dhuddu 3 during production. The film was reported to be shot in 3D and expected to be produced by Chowdhary of 18 Reels Entertainment. Following a period of stagnation, Rambhala's assistant Prem Anand took over as the project director in early 2022, following creative differences between the director and Santhanam. The film subsequently marked the second project of Prem Anand, who had earlier worked with Santhanam on the comedy series Lollu Sabha and had co-directed the film Inimey Ippadithan (2015).

Actresses Surbhi and Masoom Shankar joined the film's shoot, as did Pradeep Rawat, with scenes shot across Chennai and Pondicherry. Production on the untitled film took place throughout 2022, with the project completed by December 2022. The title of the film was publicly revealed as DD Returns in April 2023.

A song was shot on Sri Lanka.

== Music ==
The film's music is composed by OfRo in his maiden collaboration with Santhanam and Prem.

DD Returns

Soundtrack album by OfRo
- Released: 2023
- Recorded: 2022–2023
- Genre: Feature film soundtrack
- Language: Tamil
- Label: Think Music
- Producer: OfRo

OfRo chronology
Rudhran (2023)	DD Returns (2023)	Rebel (2024)

Track listing
No.	Title	Lyrics	Singer(s)	Length
1.	"French Kuthu"	Durai	Gana Muthu, OfRo	3:50
2.	"I'm So Prabalam"	Durai	ofRo, T. M. S. Selvakumar, Susha, Gana Muthu	2:46
Total length:				6:36

== Release ==
=== Theatrical ===
DD Returns was released theatrically on 28 July 2023.

=== Home media ===
The streaming rights of the film were acquired by ZEE5 and the film had its worldwide streaming release on 1 September 2023. Revanza Global Ventures has sold the Telugu, Malayalam, and Kannada Dubbing Rights for the movie "DD Returns" to Zee Entertainment Enterprises Limited.

== Reception ==
Logesh Balachandran of The Times of India gave the film 3.5 out of 5 stars and wrote, "Except for the first few minutes, the film is undoubtedly a fun ride for movie lovers looking for a clean entertainer for the weekend." Pechi Aavudaiyappan of ABP Live Tamil gave the film a positive review and noted that Santhanam gave another hit film with this horror comedy film.
