= Lollu Sabha Balaji =

Indian actor (1971 – 2014)

- Born: Balaji c. 1971
- Died: 7 March 2014 (aged 42–43); Anagaputthur, India
- Occupation: Actor

Lollu Sabha Balaji (1971 – 7 March 2014) was an Indian actor comedian who appeared in many Tamil films and television serials. He has acted in a few films, most notably Silambattam and Dindigul Sarathy.

Balaji became popular with TV comedy shows like Super 10 and Lollu Sabha and moved on to become a comedy actor. He has also written dialogues for actor Shiva's 2013-release Thillu Mullu, a remake of the Rajinikanth-starrer of the same name. Balaji is known for his comic sense and was very popular in comedy shows that spoof Tamil films and make it a laugh riot. He was the one who introduced comedian Santhanam to the director of Lollu Sabha and both the actors shot to fame with the same show.

== Partial filmography ==
=== Films ===
Actor

Year	Film	Role	Notes
2002	Pesadha Kannum Pesume		
2005	Kadhal FM	Bala	
2005	Veeranna		
2006	Prathi Gnayiru 9 Manimudhal 10.30 Varai		
2007	18 Vayasu Puyale	Chinnappadass	
2007	En Uyirinum Melana	Jeeva's friend	
2007	Ennai Paar Yogam Varum	Groom	
2008	Dindigul Sarathy		
2008	Silambattam	Duraisingam's PA	
2009	Thiru Thiru Thuru Thuru	fake Mahesh	
2009	Newtonin Moondram Vidhi		
2009	Sirithal Rasipen	Krishna	
2009	Kudiyarasu	Balaji	
2010	Ambasamudram Ambani		
2011	Minsaram	Thamizharasan's assistant	

Dialogue writer

- Thillu Mullu (2013)

=== Television ===
- Lollu Sabha

== Death ==
He was living with his wife and three children. Balaji had a severe case of jaundice and died on 7 March 2014.
