= OfRo =

Indian musician

ofRo
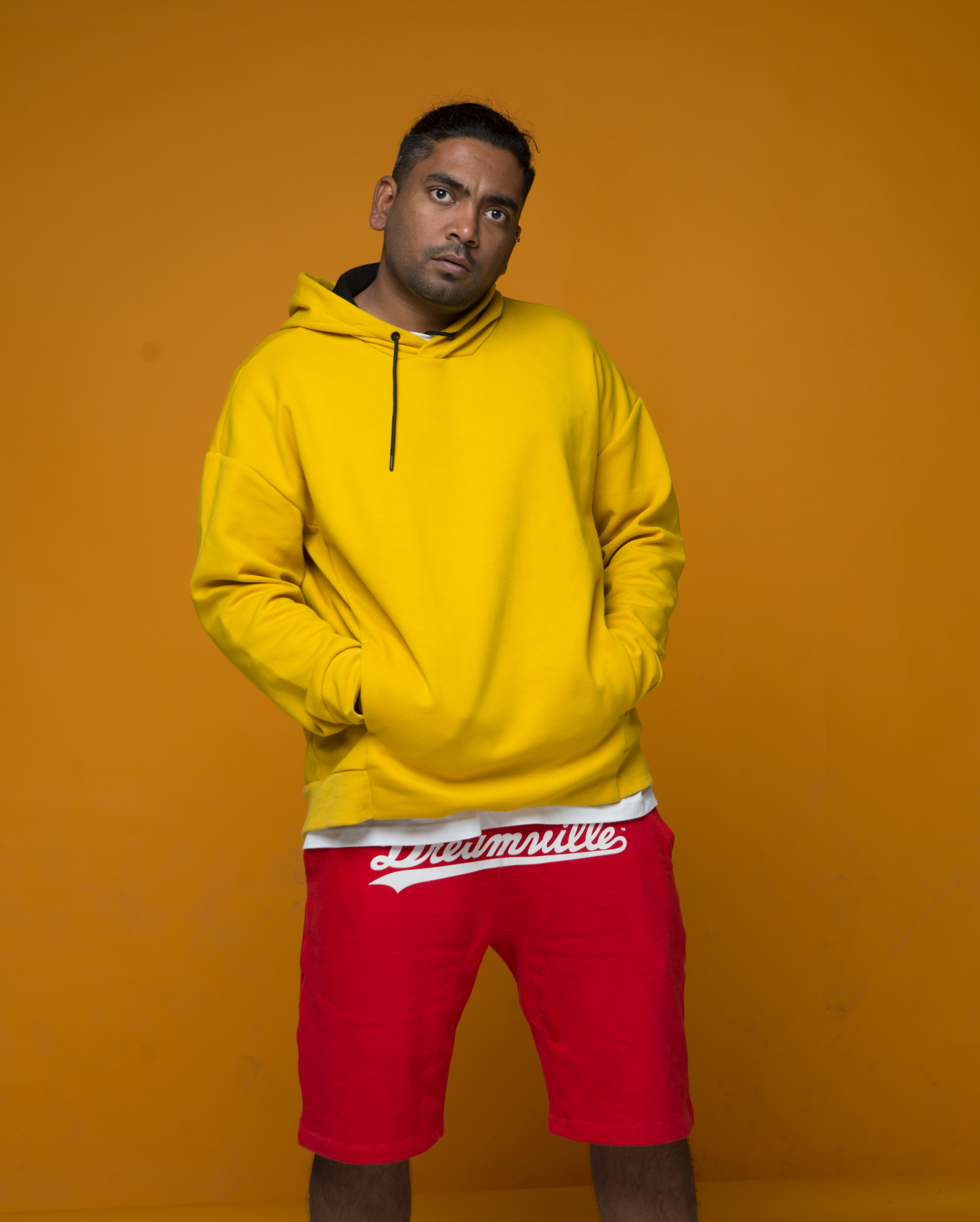
- Born: 19 July 1987 (age 39)
- Musical career
- Occupations: Record producer; songwriter; singer
- Instruments: keyboard/piano; synths
- Label: Atti Culture

Rohith Abraham (born 19 July 1987), known professionally as ofRo, is an Indian record producer, singer and songwriter who has worked with Asal Kolaar, Arivu, Durai, Paal Dabba, Kelithee, Tenma, Santhosh Narayanan, Sandy, ADK, Roshan Jamrock, Madan Gowri, R1CH ,Psychomantra, Ben Human, and The Casteless Collective, among others. He is the co-founder of Atti Culture, a record label and production company & Madras Medai, a music festival and conference focusing on the growth of independent music in South India.

== Early years ==
Rohith was born in Chennai, India, and grew up there. He started playing piano at the age of 7 and began learning on electronic instruments soon after. He began taking music seriously in 2005 with his band Nerverek.

== Career ==
In 2014, he began his career working for Harris Jayaraj as an additional programmer for the movie Yennai Arindhaal.

In 2017, he began his independent music career with his first music video, October Maadham, which featured Instagram model Sameea Bangera, Directed by Ken Royson.

In 2019, he wrote and produced Therukural, a Tamil hiphop album with Tamil rapper Arivu featuring Tenma and Roshan Jamrock. The album touched on topics of caste and class divide in India. The album received critical acclaim, and was featured in Rolling Stone India as one of the top ten Indian albums of 2019 and 5 most politically conscious hiphop in India. Arivu and ofRo performed their first song, Anti Indian at Madras Medai in 2018. He founded Therukural with Arivu, as community for artists and creatives. They would gather with hundreds of young artists, songwriters, beatboxers and more, at public parks to share ideas, songs and more. ofRo's production skill is apparent in songs like Kalla Mouni and Anti Indian.

He met ADK, a Sri Lankan rapper in Harris Jayaraj's studio in 2015, but it wasn't until 4 years later when they would work together on a song called Lityananda – a satirical piece commenting on self proclaimed godmen.

Along with co-founder and music director, Tenma, he curates Madras Medai, a premier South Indian independent music festival with the aim to build an ecosystem for future independent artists. Madras Medai was first conducted at CSI Bains School on 19 May 2018. It featured performances by artists like Dopeadelicz, Dharavi United, Sunshine Orchestra, Siennor, Othasevuru, Jatayu, Arivu x ofRo, The Casteless Collective, Chinna Ponnu and Paul Jacob.

In 2019, Atti Culture was founded as an independent record label. The label focuses on nurturing and promoting up-and-coming Tamil talent.

ofRo garnered attention for his songs with singer songwriter rapper Asal Kolaar. Jorthaale and Adi Odi became mainstream hits. The duo has produced multiple hit songs, including the chart-topping singles "Jorthaale" and "Adi Odi". They performed live at Behindwoods.

Jorthaale received the "Viral Song of the Year" award at Black Sheep awards.

In 2022, ofRo and Asal Kolaar released their follow-up single, "Adi Odi." Building on the success of "Jorthaale," the track further explored their fusion of diverse genres, incorporating elements of Tamil folk, hip-hop, and electronic dance music.

In 2023, ofRo and his long time collaborator, Ken Royson, released "Durai Sleeping" as the debut song of artist, Durai. It was released on Think Music Originals.

== Discography ==
=== Independent works ===
==== Singles ====
Independent Singles (Producer/Songwriter)
Year	Tracks	Artists	Language
2016	"10 Million"	ofRo, Keya	English
2018	"October Maadham"	ofRo	Tamil
2018	"Anti Indian" (live)	ofRO, Arivu	Tamil
2019	"Snowlin"	ofRO, Arivu	Tamil
2020	"Lityananda"	ofRO, ADK	Tamil
2020	"Let Chennai Breathe"	ofRO, Sofia Ashraf, Logan	Tamil, English
2020	"Yaarudaa Tamizhan"	ofRO, ADK	Tamil
2020	"Asal Mob"	ofRO, Asal Kolaar	Tamil
2020	"Jorthaale"	ofRO, Asal Kolaar	Tamil
2020	"Vaanaambaa"	ofRO, Asal Kolaar	Tamil
2021	"TikTok Luv"	Psychomantra, ofRO	Tamil
2021	"Bathroom Song"	Madan Gowri, ofRO, Asal Kolaar, Durai	Tamil
2021	"Ex Love Song"	Madan Gowri, ofRO, Atti Culture	Tamil
2021	"Semma Bodha"	ofRO, Hyde Karty, Sago	Tamil
2022	"Gowri Kalyanam"	ofRO, Madan Gowri, Sahi Siva, MC Sai, Swagatha Krishnan, M.S. Krsna	Tamil
2022	"Vaasam Veesum Padam"	ofRO, Chinna Ponnu	Tamil
2022	"Adi Odi"	ofRO, Asal Kolaar	Tamil
2023	"Durai Sleeping"	ofRo, Durai	Tamil
2023	"Tamizhi"	Pushpavanam Kuppusamy, ofRO, Ricardo Daniel Jimenez	Tamil
2023	"Venam Baby"	ofRO, Asal Kolaar, G. V. Prakash	Tamil
2023	"4 Bestie"	ofRo, Kelithee	Tamil
2023	"Miss"	ofRo, Kelithee	Tamil
2024	"Aagaya Thamarai"	ofRO, Asal Kolaar	Tamil
2024	"Kaathu Mela"	Paal Dabba, ofRO, Deva	Tamil
2024	"Olalai"	ofRo, Kelithee	Tamil
2024	"Gomma"	ofRO, Thajmola	Tamil
2024	"Mass Aaga"	IFT PROD, Boston IFT, ofRO, Selojan	Tamil
2025	"Irunga Bhai"	ofRo, Kelithee	Tamil
2025	"Kissa 47"	ofRo, Kelithee	Tamil
2025	"VETRIVEL"	ofRO, Kelithee, Santhosh Narayanan	Tamil
2025	"Kaipulla"	ofRO, Rahul Sridhar	Tamil
2025	"Thalaivan Oruvan"	Santhosh Narayanan, ofRO, SVDP, The Indian Choral Ensemble	Tamil
2026	"Fancy Store"	ofRo, Kelithee	Tamil
2026	"Matta Gaana"	ofRo, Asal Kolaar	Tamil

==== Albums ====
Independent Album (Producer/Songwriter)
Year	Album	Tracks	Artists	Label	Language	Ref.
2012	Fossil Feelings	"Before I think"; "Fear not of Zen"; "Fossil Feelings"; "Workahontas"	ofRo	Cuntroll Records	Instrumental	
2013	With You With Me	"In Times Like These"; "Repeat & Delete"; "Space Between"; "Waiting and Fading"	ofRo, Elaine Dowling	Echo Vortex Records	English	
2019	Therukural	"Kallamouni"; "Anti Indian"; "Snowlin"; "Sterlite" (skit); "Thamizhachi"; "OKSir"; "Middle Class"	ofRo, Arivu, Roshan Jamrock, Tenma	Indie	Tamil	

=== Feature films ===
==== As lyricist and playback singer ====
List of OfRo film credits as lyricist and playback singer
Year	Album	Tracks	Language	Composer	Lyricist	Co-Artist
2021	Jagame Thanthiram	"Naan Dhaan Da Mass"	Tamil	Santhosh Narayanan	Arivu, OfRo	Santhosh Narayanan, Arivu
2021	Jagame Tantram (D)	"Naathoti Race-u"	Telugu	Santhosh Narayanan	Bhaskarabhatla, OfRo	Santhosh Narayanan
2022	Parole	"Neurobass Ninam"	Tamil	Rajkumar Amal	Dwarakh Raja	
2022	Mahaan	"Rich Rich"	Tamil	Santhosh Narayanan	Durai	Durai
2023	Rudhran	"Jorthaale"	Tamil	OfRo	Asal Kolaar	Asal Kolaar, MC Vickey
2023	DD Returns	"French Kuthu"	Tamil	Himself	Durai	Gana Muthu
2023	DD Returns	"I'm So Prabalam"	Tamil	Himself	Durai	T. M. S. Selvakumar, Susha, Gana Muthu
2023	DD Returns	"Goinda Goinda"	Tamil	Himself		Gana Francis, Urban Thozha
2023	DD Returns	"Da Da Dadai"	Tamil	Himself		FEFSI Vijayan
2023	Jigarthanda DoubleX	"10000 Pax"	Tamil	Santhosh Narayanan	OfRo	
2023	Route No. 17	"All Is Well"	Tamil	Ouseppachan	Arya (rap)	Arya
2024	Rebel	"Rise of Rebel"	Tamil	G. V. Prakash Kumar, OfRo	Arunraja Kamaraj	Arunraja Kamaraj
2024	Rebel	"Malakeram Poiyoru Maayandi"	Tamil	Himself	Abhi Abraham	Sarang
2024	Lover	"Vaadi En Trip"	Tamil	Sean Roldan	Sean Roldan	
2024	Anweshippin Kandethum	"Viduthal"	Malayalam	Santhosh Narayanan		Dhee
2024	Codeyil Iruvar	"Aaku Paaku"	Tamil	Himself		Gopi, Sudhakar
2024	Chennai City Gangsters	"My Maima"	Tamil	D. Imman		Gana Dharani, Gaana Guna, Super Subu
2025	Sweetheart	"Awsum Kissa"	Tamil	Yuvan Shankar Raja		Kelithee, Gana Francis
2025	Aaromaley	"Dandanakka Life'U"	Tamil	Siddhu Kumar	Vishnu Edavan	T. Rajendar
2025	Ram Abdhullah Antony	"Enga kita vechikitta"	Tamil	T. R. Krishna Chethan		Jayavel Thangavelu
2025	Devil's Double Next Level	"Mella Saav"	Tamil	Himself		Gana Francis

==== As composer ====
List of OfRo film credits as composer
Year	Film	Notes
2023	College Road	
2023	Rudhran	Composed one song "Jorthaale"
2023	DD Returns	
2024	Rebel	Two songs and additional Background score
2024	Codeyil Iruvar	Composed one song "Aaku Paaku"
2025	Devil's Double Next Level	
2026	Sardar 2	Composed One Song "Mayil Veera" Along with Sam C. S.

==== Other contributions ====
As Film Score Contributor
Year	Album	Tracks	Artists	Lyrics	Language
2023	Leo	Original Score	OfRo	Keyboard Programming	Tamil
