= Dhilluku Dhuddu 2 =

2019 Indian Tamil-language horror comedy film

- Poster
- Directed by: Rambhala
- Written by: Rambhala
- Produced by: Santhanam
- Starring: Santhanam; Shritha Sivadas; Deepti; Ayesha Zeenath; Rajendran; Bipin; Urvashi
- Cinematography: Deepak Kumar Padhy
- Edited by: Madhavan M.
- Music by: Shabir
- Production company: Handmade films
- Distributed by: Trident Arts
- Release date: 7 February 2019
- Country: India
- Language: Tamil

Dhilluku Dhuddu 2 is a 2019 Indian Tamil-language horror comedy film written and directed by Rambhala. The film stars Santhanam and Shritha Sivadas, while Rajendran and Urvashi play supporting roles. The film's soundtrack is composed by Shabir. The film is a spiritual sequel to 2016 film Dhilluku Dhuddu and is the second film in the Dhilluku Dhuddu film series. The movie was released to mixed reviews but was a surprise hit at the box-office.

The film was shot in 90 days. The film released on 7 February 2019. The film was remade in Telugu as Raju Gari Gadhi 3. The climax of the movie is heavily inspired by the Hollywood film The Conjuring 2. A third film, titled DD Returns, was released in 2023.

== Plot ==
Viji and his maternal uncle are happy-go-lucky guys who create a nuisance for their neighbours due to their drunken antics. The neighbours try out different methods to escape their antics, but in vain. One of the neighbours, Karthik, who is a doctor by profession, comes across nurse Maya, whom he is in love with. However, when Karthik tries to express his love, he is beaten black and blue by a mysterious ghost. After finding out details about Maya and the ghost, the doctor and other neighbours plot against Viji to make him fall in love with Maya and let the ghost take care of him. Injured in a fight, Viji, seeking a physiotherapist's help, falls in love with Maya, who was engineered by his neighbours. Things take a twist, and Viji is thrashed by the ghost. Viji finds out that Maya's father Garudaraja Bhattadhri is a powerful magician in Kerala and that he had set the ghost to protect Maya. Viji sets out to Kerala to convince Maya's father, along with his uncle. They insult Bhattadhri, and he sets out to do a pooja to harm them. To escape that, they ask for Chakra Mahadevi's help. It turns out that both Bhattadhri and Mahadevi are fake and that there is a real ghost protecting Maya. They go to a black magician, where he reveals the flashback about the ghost.

In 1857, a British man named George Williams went to India, where he seduced girls and ruined their lives. Due to a job transfer, he came to Kerala, where his lustful gaze fell on Devyani Kutti, but he was unaware that she was the daughter of the king of black magic, Marthanda Varma. Soon, Marthanda Varma learned about George, so to kill George, he took the great Yatchi palm script on a pournami day and gave an order to Yatchi to protect his daughter. That night, George proposes to Devyani and at that moment, Yatchi killed George. After British left India, he stuffed Yatchi into an idol and buried it.

After that, Maya's father says that he has a similar Yatchi in his house, so the magician does some pooja to determine whether it is active, so that time it is active. To kill the Yatchi, they need to retrieve the palm script from the bungalow where Maya's father took the Yatchi which happens to be the black magician Marthanda Varma lived. Viji and others had various encounters with other ghosts there, they finally retrieved the palm script and gave to the magician who continues the pooja, where he requests the Yatchi to leave Maya as she is to be married. The Yatchi refuses, thrashing down the magician and throws the palm script to fire pit. The Yatchi possess Maya attempting for her to get suicide on the bungalow. When Viji and Maya's father attempts to save her were failing, to everyone's surprise, the ghost of king of black magic, Marthanda Varma comes at right time performing the closure ritual and thereby killing the ghost. The end credits show Viji confronting his neighbors who were enjoying his departure were shocked to see him alive and well with Viji thanking them their attempts to throw him down has turned over a new leaf in his life where he and Maya got settled along with Viji maternal uncle lived happily ever after.

== Cast ==
- Santhanam as Vijay (Viji)
- Shritha Sivadas as Dr. Maya
- Rajendran as Viji's uncle
- Urvashi as Chakra Mahadevi
- Bipin as Garudaraja Bhattadhri (Maya's father)
- T. M. Karthik as Dr. Karthik
- G. Marimuthu as Thalaivar
- K. Sivasankar as Viji's neighbour
- K. Bujji Babu as Viji's neighbour
- KPY Ramar as Viji's neighbour
- Dhanasekar as Azhagu, Viji's neighbour
- Maaran as "Mike" Maaran
- Sri Kala
- Deepti as Yatchi

== Soundtrack ==
The soundtrack was composed by Shabir.

Dhilluku Dhuddu 2

Soundtrack album by Shabir
- Released: 2019
- Recorded: 2020
- Genre: Feature film soundtrack
- Length: 8:39
- Language: Tamil
- Label: Think Music India
- Producer: Shabir

Shabir chronology
Neeya 2 (2019)	Dhilluku Dhuddu 2 (2019)	Nenjamundu Nermaiyundu Odu Raja (2019)

No.	Title	Singer(s)	Length
1.	"Mavanae Yaarukittae"	Gana Vinoth, Shabir, Yamini Ghantasala	2:52
2.	"Kathadi Pol"	Maria Vincent, Shabir	3:03
3.	"Mavanae Yaarukittae Remix"	Rabbit Mac, Shabir	2:44

== Release and reception ==
The film released on 7 February 2019 to mixed reviews from critics and positive response from audience and became an box office success.

A critic from The Times of India rated the film three out of five wrote that "While many comedy scenes hit the target, some of them fail to do so. The spooky scenes in the pre climax portions have ample fun elements, though it's a bit stretched which affected the mood to a small extent". A critic from Cinema Express rated the film two-and-a-half out of five stars and wrote that "Some gags work, some lines are funny, many are offensive… and for the most part, the film’s just tiresome". A critic from The Hindu wrote that "Dhilluku Dhuddu 2 is certainly late to the party as far as the ‘horror comedy’ bandwagon is concerned, but it might just give some hope to Santhanam’s dwindling career". A critic from The Indian Express rated the film one out of five and wrote that "Overall, Dhilluku Dhuddu 2 plays out like a rehashed ‘Lollu Sabha’ rehearsal session, sans purpose, fun and good humour".
