= Lollu Sabha Jeeva =

Indian actor

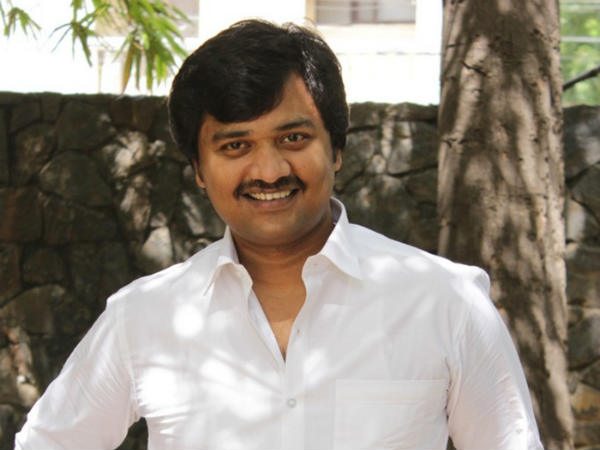
- Born: 31 July 1985 (age 41); Karaikudi, Sivagangai, Tamil Nadu
- Occupations: Actor; Comedian
- Years active: 2003–present
- Political party: Kamarajar Makkal Katchi (Youth leader)

Jeeva Thangavel, popularly known as Lollu Sabha Jeeva, is an Indian actor and comedian. He started his career with the television show Lollu Sabha alongside another comedian Santhanam.

== Filmography ==
=== Films ===
Year	Film	Role	Notes
2007	Vegam	Ashwin's friend	
2008	Kuruvi	Bujjibabu	
2008	Alibaba	Velu's Friend	
2009	Ninaithale Inikkum	Karthik	
2009	Adhe Neram Adhe Idam	Jeeva	
2009	Kanden Kadhalai	Arjun	Guest appearance
2010	Madrasapattinam	Cab driver	
2010	Aattanayagan	Lingam's friend	
2011	Mathuvum Mythiliyum	Deepak	
2011	Doo	Karthik	
2011	Puli Vesham		
2011	Yuvan	PT Teacher	Tamil version only
2011	Kasethan Kadavulada	Gaja	
2011	Mahaan Kanakku	Gopi	
2012	Murattu Kaalai	Kaalaiyan's brother	
2013	Aandava Perumal		
2013	Isakki	Caretaker of Devarajan's house	
2014	Kochadaiiyaan	Portrayed as Rajnikanth character in few scenes	
2015	Agileswari		Malaysia Tamil Movie
2015	Idhu Enna Maayam	Shaaji	
2016	Jambulingam 3D		
2017	Aarambamae Attakasam	Jeeva	
2017	Bayama Irukku	Shiva	
2018	Merlin		
2020	Biskoth	David Billa	Guest appearance
2020	Kombu	Karthick	
2022	Bestie	Jeeva	Guest appearance
2025	Tharaipadai		
2025	Vaanaran		

=== Television ===
Year	Program	Role	TV Channel	Notes
2003-2008	Lollu Sabha		Vijay TV	
2007	Arasi		Sun TV	
2008	Kana Kaanum Kaalangal	Jeeva, Teacher	Vijay TV	
2021-2022	Enga Veetu Meenakshi	Chithambaram	Colors Tamil	
2022	Sutta Kadhai	Commander Arun Kumar Vikram (Karnan)	Kalaignar TV	
2023	Joking Bad	Saul Kavarimaan	Netflix India	Parody of Breaking Bad
