= Lollu Sabha =

Indian television series (2003-2008)

- Genre: Dramedy
- Directed by: Rambhala
- Opening theme: Lollu Sabha
- Country of origin: India
- Original language: Tamil
- No. of seasons: 5
- No. of episodes: 156

Production
- Camera setup: Multi-camera
- Running time: approx. 40-45 minutes per episode

Original release
- Network: Vijay TV
- Release: 1 August 2003 – 24 August 2008

Lollu Sabha is a 2003–2008 Indian Tamil-language comedy series written by Rambhala and starring Santhanam, Swaminathan, Lollu Sabha Manohar, Balaji, Jangiri Madhumitha. It was broadcast on STAR Vijay with 156 episodes. Each episode of the series was a spoof of a Tamil feature film and television show. Comedy actor Santhanam, Swaminathan, Manohar, Yogi Babu and Madhumitha are the leads of the show.

== Cast ==
- Santhanam
- Swaminathan
- Jeeva
- Lollu Sabha Balaji
- Lollu Sabha Manohar
- Easter
- Lollu Sabha Seshu
- Udhay
- Maaran
- Antony
- Pazhaniyappan
- Ravikumar (Monkey Ravi)
- Mullai
- Udumalai Ravi
- Karthick
- Akash
- Swetha
- Soundarya
- Shobana
- Vinodhini
- Rajini Nivetha
- Muthu Shravan
- Auto Pancha (GD Vignesh Auto driver)
- Venkatraj
- Kandhan
- Arun Raj (Alden)
- Yogi Babu
- Chinni Jayanth
- Jangiri Madhumitha
- Thalapathy Dinesh
- Shakeela
- Mumtaz Pakoda Kathar
- Ambani Shankar
- S. Prem Anand
- Sembuli Jagan

== Development ==
In 2004, Rambhala pitched the idea of Lollu Sabha to the Star Vijay group's programming head Pradeep Milroy Peter, who approved for the show to be made. The concept was initially supposed to be a two-minute skit as a part of another show called Breakfast Show that Rambhala was working on, but the channel's head, Vijay Iyer, asked for 30-minute episodes to be made instead. The success of Lollu Sabha paved the way for a new era of comedy shows across Tamil channels.

== List ==
=== Films spoofed ===
- 7G Rainbow Colony [7J Orampo Colony]
- Aaru [Aaru Padu Joru]
- Aayutha Ezhuthu [ஃ Ezhuthu]
- Alaipayuthey [Ullaikothikuthe]
- Amaidhi Padai
- Aarulirinthu Aruvathu varai [Aarulirunthu Arukkura Varai]
- Amarkkalam [Amakkalam]
- Amman Kovil Kizhakale [Aayaa Koil Appaale]
- Anandham [Anandham Illeengo]
- Anbe Aaruyire [Attupiecey Aayaamoonjey]
- Annaamalai [Ennaamalai]
- Anniyan [Onion]
- Andha 7 Naatkal [Andha 7½ Naatkal]
- Arindhum Ariyamalum [Avindhum Aviyamalum]
- Arunachalam [Andaachalam]
- Attagasam [Kettavaasam]
- Autograph [Summergraph]
- Avvai Shanmughi [Avvai Chappamuki]
- Ayyaa [Paiyaa]
- Baasha [Bacha]
- Baba [Maavaa]
- Bharatha Vilas [Bar Atha Vilas]
- Billa [Gulla]
- Chandramukhi [Sappamuki]
- Cheran Pandiyan [Seraatha Pandiyan]
- Chinna Gounder [Donna Gounder]
- Chinna Thambi [Chinna Thumbi]
- Citizen [Jettisen]
- C. I. D. Shankar [Co. Me. Dy. Shankar]
- Dhavani Kanavugal [Thalakaani Kanavugal]
- Dheena [Onaa]
- Dhill [Dhill Irundha Parunga]
- Dhool [Siyakkaai Dhool]
- Duet [Duet: Vayasaanavanga Paadunadhu]
- Ethir Neechal [Edhu Neechal]
- Enga Ooru Pattukaran [Enga Area Paattukaaran]
- Enga Veettu Pillai [Ethir Veettu Pillai]
- Ejamaan
- Evana Irundha Enakenna [Evana Irundha Velakkenna]
- Gentleman [Kindalman]
- Gunaa [Ena]
- Gilli [Jalli]
- Ithu Thaanda Police [Idhudhanda Foolish]
- Idhayam [Idhayam Illathavan]
- Idhaya Kovil [Idhu En Kovil]
- Indian [Gindian]
- Jayam [Bhayam]
- Kaadhal [Kaadhal Vaysanathu]
- Kaakha Kaakha [Kaakkaa Kaakkaa - The Foolish]
- Kadalora Kavithaigal [Kadalora Kazhuthaigal]
- Kadhal Kondein [Kadalai Kondein]
- Kadhal Kottai [Kadhal Settai]
- Kadhal Mannan [Kathaala Mannan]
- Kadhalukku Mariyadhai [Kadhaluku Avamariyadhai]
- Kandukondain Kandukondain [Kandukaatha Kandukaatha]
- Karakattakkaran [Keragaattakaaran]
- Kattradhu Thamizh [Katradhu Dumeel]
- Keladi Kanmani [Keladi Kullamani]
- Kireedom [Freedom]
- Kizhake Pogum Rail [Kurukke Pogum Rail]
- Kizhakku Vaasal [Kirukku Vaasal]
- Kizhakku Seemaiyile [Kelatu Seemaiyile]
- M. Kumaran S/O Mahalakshmi [M. Kullan S/O Megalakshmi]
- Maayi [Paayi]
- Mann Vasanai [Masala Vaasanai]
- Malaiyoor Mambattiyan [Mylapore Mambattiyan]
- Manithan [Manithan Maaritaan]
- Mella Thirandhathu Kadhavu [Mollama Thorangada Kadhava]
- Minnale [Kindale]
- Minsaara Kanavu [Minsara Kanaa]
- Moondru Mugam [Muthina Mugam]
- Mr. Bharath [Mixture Barath]
- Mudhalvan
- Mugavaree [Mughaveri]
- Muthu
- Muthal Mariyathai [Rendavathu Mariyathai]
- Mythili Ennai Kaathali [Mythili En Thalavali]
- Naalai Namadhe
- Naan Avan Illai [Naan Avan Illeengo]
- Nandhaa [Indhaa]
- Narasimha [Narasamma]
- Natpukkaaga [Oppukkaaga]
- Nattamai [NOT Taamai]
- Nayakan [Vinaayagan]
- Nenjam Marappathillai [Konjam Marappathillai]
- Nenjil Or Aalayam
- New [Q]
- Padayappa [Vadaiyappa]
- Pallaandu Vaazhga [Full Aandu Vaazhga]
- Pallikoodam [Ballikoodam]
- Pithamagan [Peelamagan]
- Pokkiri [Bakkery]
- Ponnumani
- Poovellam Un Vaasam [Pooriyellam Kizhangu Vaasam]
- Priya [Freeya Paarunga]
- Pudhupettai [Pudhu Settai]
- Pudhu Pudhu Arthangal [Puthu Puthu Varuthangal]
- Pudhu Vasantham
- Pandavar Bhoomi [Aandavar Bhoomi]
- Ramanaa [Summanaa]
- Raja Chinna Roja [Raja Dammathundu Roja]
- Ratha Kanneer [Sotha Kanneer]
- Roja [Saroja: Saama Nikkalo]
- Run [Run: 0 for All Out]
- Samsaram Adhu Minsaram [Samsaram Adhu Avatharam]
- Sangamam [Sangrumam]
- Santosh Subramaniam [Santhula Subramaniyam]
- Salangai Oli [Sangada Oli]
- Saraswathi Sabatham
- Seevalaperi Pandi [Seevala Berikka Pandi]
- Sindhu Bhairavi [Sindhu By Ravi]
- Sivakasi [Amukkivaasi]
- Something Something Unakkum Enakkum [Nothing Nothing Ungalukkum Engalukkum]
- Subramaniapuram [Supermaniyapuram]
- Sullan [Ullaan]
- Suryavamsam [Loosvamsam]
- Thalapathi [Thalavithi]
- Thambi [Thumbi]
- Thanga Padhakkam [Thangaatha Padhakkam]
- Thavamai Thavamirundhu [Kadanaai kadanirunthu]
- Thee [Tea]
- Thevar Magan [Thenavattu magan]
- Thillana Mohanambal
- Thimiru [Thimiru Engalukkillai]
- Thiruda Thiruda
- Thirumalai [Thirumazhai]
- Thirupaachi [Veruppaachi]
- Thiruvilaiyadal
- Thiruttu Payale [Thiruttu Pasanga]
- Thotti Jaya [Vetti Jaya]
- Unnidathil Ennai Koduthen [Unnidathil Vennai Koduthen]
- Uyirullavarai Usha
- Varalaru [Thagaraaru: Bad Father]
- Varavu Nalla Uravu [Varavu Romba Koravu]
- Vaaname Ellai [Vaanarame Thollai]
- Vaanathaipola [Varuvaarupola]
- Vaazhkai [Vazhukkai]
- Vedham Pudhithu [Saadham Puthithu]
- Vetri Kodi Kattu [Vetri Pottiya Kattu]
- Vettaiyaadu Vilaiyaadu [Vettaiyadu Velladu]
- Veyil [Uchi Veyil]
- Virumaandi [Kurumaandi]
- Walter Vetrivel [Vaal Paiyan Vetrivel]
- Yaaradi Nee Mohini [Yaarada Nee Komaali]

=== TV shows spoofed ===
- Leoni Pattimandram [Idli vs Dosa / Trisha vs Jyothika]
- Arattai Arangam [Parattai Arangam]
- Pepsi Ungal Choice [Goli Soda Ungal Choice]
- Lion Dates Top 10 Movies [Countrywoods Kandravi Countdown]
- Nescafé Sunrise Neengal Ketta Paadal [Lemon Rice Yarumae Kekkadha Paadal]
- Malarum Mottum [Pinjile Pazhuthadu]
- Kaun Banega Crorepati [Phone Pannanga Umapathi]
- Star Cricket [Judgement Day]
- Kathayalla Nijam [Kathaiyalla Kasmaalam]
- Kalakka Povathu Yaaru [Adi Vaanga Povadhu Yaaru]
- Madhan's Thirai Paarvai [Budhans Durapaarvai]
- Grandmaster [Pasanga Manasula Yaaru? Andha Figure-ku Enna Peru]
- Mudhal Vanakkam
- Neeya Naana [Veena Pona Suna Paana]
- Indha Naal Iniya Naal [Indha Naal Imsai Naal]

=== Others ===
- Raapichai
- Poli Doctor Pothiraj
- Buildup Peelarao
- Mega Serialnga Romba Thollainga
- Siri Siri Darbar
- Veerappan
- Modern Swayamvaram
- Bhagavathar vs Michael Jackson
- Thalaippu Vekka Therila
- Bioscope

== Controversies ==
In early 2007, the show's crew were forced to tender apology for parodying the film Pokkiri.

On 8 July 2008, during the height of the show's success, some of its cast and crew members received mysterious parcel bombs with threatening messages.

== See also ==
- Joking Bad
