= Santhanam (actor) =

Indian actor and film producer

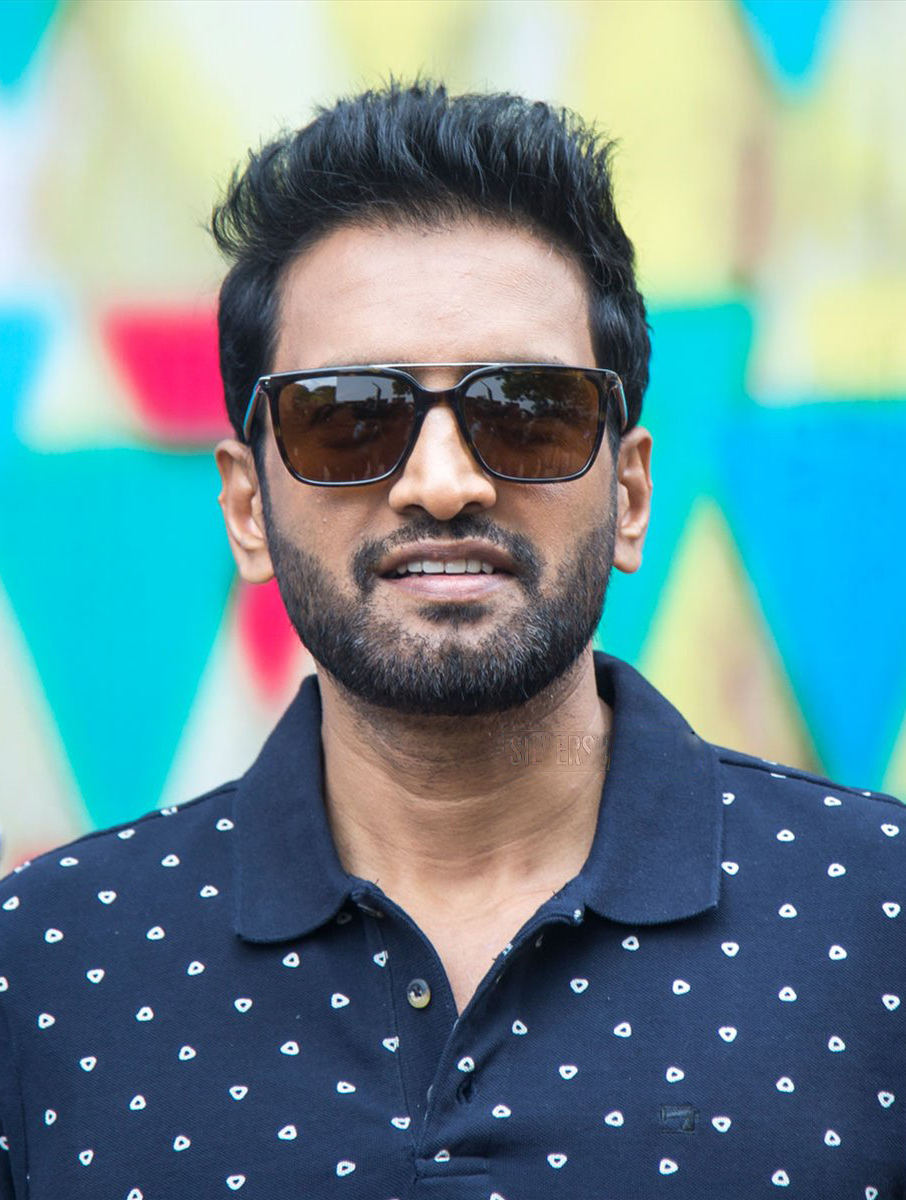
- Santhanam at A1 Press Meet
- Born: Santhanam Neelamegam; January 21, 1980 (age 46); Pozhichalur (near Pallavaram), Madras, Tamil Nadu, India
- Occupations: Actor, Film producer
- Years active: 2001–present
- Spouse: Usha
- Children: 3
- Honours: Kalaimamani - 2018

Santhanam Neelamegam (born 21 January 1980) is an Indian actor and film producer who mainly works in Tamil cinema. Beginning his career as a comedian on television, he rose to fame through his performances in Star Vijay's Lollu Sabha enacting the lead role in spoofs of Tamil films. He was subsequently given a chance by actor Silambarasan to feature in a supporting role in Manmadhan (2004) and then was signed on to appear in a host of films, notably winning good reviews for his work in Sachein (2005) and Polladhavan (2007). He appeared in a one-off leading role in Shankar's production Arai En 305-il Kadavul (2008) and became a staple feature as a comedian with his brand of insult comedy becoming very successful during the period, with his market popularity helping stuck films find distributors.

Santhanam has also had embarked on collaborations with directors including gaining positive reviews for his work in M. Rajesh's comic trilogy of Siva Manasula Sakthi (2009), Boss Engira Bhaskaran (2010) and Oru Kal Oru Kannadi (2012), winning the Vijay Award for Best Comedian for each one. He has also repeatedly collaborated in the films of A. L. Vijay, Siva and Sundar C as well.

His consistently well-received performances and box office appeal in the early 2010s prompted the film industry to dub him as the "Comedy Superstar". In 2012, he began a film production company named Handmade Films and produced his first film, Kanna Laddu Thinna Aasaiya (2013), which went on to become a commercially successful venture. Meanwhile, in 2014, he starred in the leading role for the second time in the action comedy Vallavanukku Pullum Aayudham.

== Career ==
Unlike comedians such as Vadivelu and Vivek who usually appear in comedy tracks separate from the main plot, Santhanam mostly plays either the male protagonist's friend or enemy, forming an essential part of the plot. He has noted that he actively avoided being a part of separate comedy tracks within films, maintaining that appearing as an actor in the story would stop his comedy from becoming monotonous.

His appeal at the box office was evident after films such as Leelai and Kadhal Pisase were able to find distributors following long delays, while Telugu film-makers S S Rajamouli and Sai Kiran Adivi partially shot scenes with the actor before releasing a Tamil version of their Telugu films, through Naan Ee and Vinayaga.

Santhanam's first production venture, Kanna Laddu Thinna Aasaiya directed by Manikandan, became a commercially successful venture upon release in January 2013. Producing the venture under his newly formed studio Handmade Films, Santhanam opted to introduce a predominantly new cast and keep a low budget for the project understanding that film production had "previously ended the careers of many". Featuring Santhanam as one of the three lead characters alongside his close friend and dermatologist Sethu and Power Star Srinivasan, the film was well received by critics, with a reviewer noting "there is a serious actor hidden somewhere inside Santhanam, who seems to be waiting for the right opportunity or role to break out of the comedian and sidekick roles he is confined to now", adding that "he can put many commercially successful actors to shame". He featured a journalist in Kannan's comedy film Settai alongside Arya and Premgi Amaren, also serving as an assistant director, while he then also played a popular role of a love guru in Sundar C's Theeya Velai Seiyyanum Kumaru. He continued to feature in well received roles in commercially successful films like Raja Rani and Vanakkam Chennai, and his work in Endrendrum Punnagai with Jiiva and Vinay, was also praised with a critic noting that "with his spot-on comedy, measured histrionics and his immense likeability, he is a revelation and provides some hearty laughs". A set-back came in the form of his fourth collaboration with Rajesh in All in All Azhagu Raja which became a surprise failure, and a critic wrote "though he does have his moments, the comedy seems to be forced, many of the scenes greatly exaggerated, and his portrayal of Kareena Chopra is a disaster".

In 2014, he appeared in the leading role in Srinath's Vallavanukku Pullum Aayudham, a remake of the 2010 Telugu film Maryada Ramanna. In preparation for the film, Santhanam lost weight, sported a different look and attended dance classes as well as reducing his work by being more selective on accepting other scripts. The film opened in May 2014 to positive reviews and box office success with a critic noting that "it is a Santhanam show all the way" and that "he also delivers as a complete actor, displaying a range of emotions". He told in an interview that he is not interested in playing supporting roles (comedian) anymore. He’s continued to play lead roles in films like Inimey Ippadithaan (2015) and Dhilluku Dhuddu (2016) and Sakka Podu Podu Raja (2017). The actor has become conscious about his looks and is constantly working on it.

He starred in Dhilluku Dhuddu 2 (2019) which is the sequel to Dhilluku Dhuddu. Santhanam's brand of comedy is 'giving counters' or mocking heroes, villains and everyone in the film something that Goundamani used to do. His film, A1 (2019) was followed with Dagaalty (2020).He appeared in Kannan’s Biskoth (2020), where he plays a biscuit factory employee, who discovers that he is an 18th-century king. In Parris Jeyaraj (2021), Santhanam is a YouTuber who is famous among youngsters for his gaana songs. Next in Dikkiloona (2021), a science fiction comedy film written and directed by Karthik Yogi. In Agent Kannayiram (2022), Santhanam played the role of a self-proclaimed, private detective who tries to solve the mystery behind the unsolved dead bodies found in and around the railway tracks.

In 2023, he delivered his next, titled DD Returns, a horror comedy. It opened with positive reviews from both critics and audience. However, Kick and 80s Buildup was released to negative reviews. In 2024, follow Vadakkupatti Ramasamy and Inga Naan Thaan Kingu.

== Personal life ==
Santhanam grew up in Pozhichalur, near Pallavaram in Chennai. Santhanam married Usha in 2004. It was an arranged marriage by their parents. They have three children. He is very close to Silambarasan, who gave him his first movie breakthrough, and considers him his godfather.

== Controversies ==
Santhanam was involved in controversy after he performed an impersonation of Mukesh Harane, a 24-year-old tobacco user who died of oral cancer and featured in health-risk warning cards before films in India, in the film All in All Azhagu Raja. In 2013, a dialogue laced with double entendres uttered by him in Endrendrum Punnagai created controversy. He was accused of making remarks against women; due to protests, the dialogue was removed from the film. Santhanam was booked for allegedly assaulting a Chennai-based builder who reportedly took a huge sum from Santhanam for a real estate deal. Santhanam's mockery of disabled people in the film Dikkiloona has been met with harsh condemnation from various social activists. Santhanam's view on the film Jai Bhim earned him criticism. He was called caste chauvinist by fans for his alleged relationship with chiefs of Pattali Makkal Katchi, Ramadoss and Anbumani Ramadoss.

== Filmography ==
=== Single roles ===
Key
†	Denotes films that have not yet been released

Year	Film	Role	Notes
2008	Arai En 305-il Kadavul	Raasu Krishnamoorthy	
2013	Kanna Laddu Thinna Aasaiya	Kaalkaatu Kalliyaperumal "KK"	Also producer
2014	Vallavanukku Pullum Aayudham	Shakthi	Also producer
2015	Inimey Ippadithaan	Seenu	Also producer
2016	Dhilluku Dhuddu	Kumar	Also producer
2017	Sakka Podu Podu Raja	Santa	
2019	Dhilluku Dhuddu 2	Viji	Also producer
2019	A1	Saravanan	Also producer
2020	Dagaalty	Guru	Also producer
2021	Parris Jeyaraj	Jeyaraj	
2021	Sabhaapathy	Sabhaapathy	
2022	Gulu Gulu	Google aka Gulu Gulu / Mario	
2022	Agent Kannayiram	Detective Kannayiram	
2023	DD Returns	Sathish	
2023	Kick	Santhosh	
2023	80s Buildup	Kathir	
2024	Vadakkupatti Ramasamy	Ramasamy	
2024	Inga Naan Thaan Kingu	Vetrivel	
2025	Devil's Double Next Level	Krishnamoorthy "Kissa"	
TBA	Server Sundaram	K. Sundaram	

=== Non-Single roles ===
Key
†	Denotes films that have not yet been released

Year	Film	Role	Notes
2020	Biskoth	Rajasimmha, Raja, Simmha and Baabubali	Quadruple role
2021	Dikkiloona	Mani, EB Mani and Mappillai Mani	Triple role

== Television ==
Year	Show	Role	TV Channel
2000–2001	Tea Kadai Bench		Win TV
2003	Annamalai	Sakthi	Sun TV
2003	Sagalai Vs Ragalai		STAR Vijay
2003–2004	Lollu Sabha		STAR Vijay

== Awards ==
Santhanam awards and nominations
Awards and nominations
Award	Wins	Nominations
Filmfare Awards South	0	4
Vijay Awards	5	7
SIIMA	1	4
Edison Awards	2	2
Ananda Vikatan Cinema Awards	3	4
Behindwoods Gold Medal Awards	1	1
Norway Tamil Film Festival Awards	1	1

Totals (Note: Certain award groups do not simply award one winner. They acknowledge several different recipients, have runners-up, and have third place. Since this is a specific recognition and is different from losing an award, runner-up mentions are considered wins in this award tally. For simplification and to avoid errors, each award in this list has been presumed to have had a prior nomination.)
- Wins: 16
- Nominations: 23

Year	Award	Category	Film	Result	Ref
2009	4th Vijay Awards	Best Comedian	Siva Manasula Sakthi	Won	
2010	58th Filmfare Awards South	Best Supporting Actor	Boss Engira Bhaskaran	Nominated	
2010	Ananda Vikatan Cinema Awards	Best Comedian	Boss Engira Bhaskaran	Won	
2010	Edison Awards (India)	Best Comedian	Boss Engira Bhaskaran	Won	
2010	5th Vijay Awards	Best Comedian	Boss Engira Bhaskaran	Won	
2011	59th Filmfare Awards South	Best Supporting Actor	Deiva Thirumagal	Nominated	
2011	59th Filmfare Awards South	Best Supporting Actor	Siruthai	Nominated	
2011	Ananda Vikatan Cinema Awards	Best Comedian	Deiva Thirumagal	Won	
2011	Ananda Vikatan Cinema Awards	Best Comedian	Velayudham	Won	
2011	6th Vijay Awards	Best Comedian	Deiva Thirumagal	Won	
2011	SIIMA Awards	Best Comedian	Vaanam	Won	
2012	7th Vijay Awards	Best Comedian	Oru Kal Oru Kannadi	Won	
2012	Ananda Vikatan Cinema Awards	Best Comedian	Oru Kal Oru Kannadi	Won	
2012	60th Filmfare Awards South	Best Supporting Actor	Oru Kal Oru Kannadi	Nominated	
2012	SIIMA Awards	Best Comedian	Oru Kal Oru Kannadi	Nominated	
2012	Chennai Times Award	Best Comedian	Oru Kal Oru Kannadi	Won	
2012	Norway Tamil Film Festival Awards	Best Comedian	Oru Kal Oru Kannadi	Won	
2012	Edison Awards (India)	Best Comedian	Oru Kal Oru Kannadi	Won	
2013	8th Vijay Awards	Best Comedian	Theeya Velai Seiyyanum Kumaru	Won	
2013	SIIMA Awards	Best Comedian	Theeya Velai Seiyyanum Kumaru	Nominated	
2013	Behindwoods Gold Medal Award	Best Acting Performance	Raja Rani	Won	
2013	Behindwoods Gold Medal Award	Best Acting Performance	Endrendrum Punnagai	Won	
2015	SIIMA Awards	Best Comedian	Vasuvum Saravananum Onna Padichavanga	Nominated	
2015	Vijay Awards	Best Comedian	Aranmanai	Nominated	
2018	Kalaimamani Award	Contribution to the field of art and literature	—N/a	Won	
