= Marumalarchi =

Marumalarchi may refer to:

- Maru Malarchi, a 1998 Indian Tamil-language drama film
- Marumalarchi (1956 film), an Indian Tamil language film
- Marumalarchi Dravida Munnetra Kazhagam, a political party in Tamil Nadu, India; split from the Dravida Munnetra Kazhagam
- Marumalarchi Bharathi, an Indian filmmaker
