= Henry (producer) =

Indian film producer and film distributor

- Born: 19 December; India
- Occupation: Film producer

Henry is an Indian film producer and film distributor, who heads the studios Carolina Films and Pangaj Productions.

== History ==
Henry began his film career as a producer through Carolina Films and notably made Yavanika (1982), a Malayalam film with Mammootty in the lead role. The film performed well commercially and launched the career of Mammootty, while Henry won the Kerala State Film Award for Best Film prize. Despite the success, Henry moved on to make Tamil films and produced several films in Madras. He made Kolangal (1995) through Carolina Films, but created Pangaj Productions for his next release Bharathi Kannamma (1997), the debut of director Cheran. The studio's next two films, the social dramas Maru Malarchi (1998) and Pudhumai Pithan (1998), also fared well commercially.

The success of the films prompted the studio to consider other projects such as Pramod's Mazhai Vara Poguthae featuring Ajith Kumar and Vanavedikkai featuring Suriya, but neither film materialised despite Prabhu Deva later replacing Ajith in the former venture. The former film was planned as a bilingual in Hindi and Tamil, with Juhi Chawla and Pratap Pothen in further lead roles. In 1999, the studio worked with actor Vijayakanth for Kallazhagar. The success of the film prompted the studio to sign Vijayakanth for another venture, based on the massacre of an Australian Christian missionary in a tribal village of Orissa. However, the film was later shelved.

In 2010, following the failure of the bilingual film Vandae Maatharam, Henry alleged that Mammootty's lack of interest in the project was the reason behind the film's delay and poor box office performance. The film had taken over three years in production, and had initially been launched with great fanfare after Henry announced that A. R. Rahman would compose music and Amitabh Bachchan would portray a guest role. However, financial problems meant that neither happened, and the final product lacked finesse. Henry claimed that the actor "sleep walked through the film", "was wooden in action scenes" and "could not do stunt scenes". Despite their previous success, Henry vowed never to work with the actor again.

Henry then started producing a Hindi film in 2011 titled Alert 24x7 by Sojan Joseph starring Sanjay Dutt and Raveena Tandon. Within a month of the film's launch, the actors and technicians walked out citing the producer's financial problems. Later that year, Henry openly criticised the operations of the Tamil Film Producers Council.

== Filmography ==
=== Carolina Films ===
Title	Year	Language	Director	Cast	Synopsis	Ref.
Yavanika	1982	Malayalam	K. G. George	Mammootty, Bharath Gopi, Jalaja		
Kolangal	1995	Tamil	I. V. Sasi	Jayaram, Khushbu, Raghuvaran		

=== Pangaj Productions ===
Title	Year	Language	Director	Cast	Synopsis	Ref.
Bharathi Kannamma	1997	Tamil	Cheran	R. Parthiepan, Meena, Raja	Bharathi, who works for a rich man, and Kannama, the daughter of a rich landlord, fall in love. Kannamma commits suicide by burning herself as she cannot marry Bharathi because of their caste difference	
Maru Malarchi	1998	Tamil	K. Bharathi	Mammootty, Devayani, Ranjith	Rasu Padayachi, a village chief, is loved by everyone in his village for his good deeds. When he is assaulted due to a misunderstanding, conflict arises between two villages	
Pudhumai Pithan	1998	Tamil	S. K. Jeeva	R. Parthiepan, Devayani, Roja, Priya Raman	Jeeva is framed and sent to a mental asylum and his family murdered when he earns the enmity of a corrupt politician. He escapes the asylum and exacts revenge on the politician who destroyed his life.	
Kallazhagar	1999	Tamil	K. Bharathi	Vijayakanth, Laila, Sonu Sood	A man decides to save a temple from being bombed by terrorists.	
Kannukku Kannaga	2000	Tamil	S. Dhayalan	Murali, Devayani, Raja, Vindhya	Devi is afraid to tell her brother that she loves Arun. On learning about their relationship, he agrees to the marriage, but an astrologer predicts that he will die if Devi births a male child.	
Vandae Maatharam	2010	Tamil / Malayalam	T. Aravind	Mammootty, Arjun, Sneha, Shraddha Arya	Two tough police officers are dedicated towards the eradication of terrorism. They also work towards the cause of farmer's welfare and are disturbed by the infiltration of terrorists in this arena.	
