= Bandekar =

Bandekar is a surname. People with the name include:

- Aadesh Bandekar
- Suchitra Bandekar
- Shwetha Bandekar
- Sameer Bandekar
- Saurabh Bandekar

== See also ==
- Bandekar family
