= My Dear Bootham =

My Dear Bootham may refer to:

- My Dear Bootham (TV series)
- My Dear Bootham (film)
