= My Dear Bootham Abhilash =

Indian actor

Abhilash
- Born: c. 1995; Gudur, Nellore district Andhra Pradesh, India
- Occupations: Actor; Producer; Production Controller
- Years active: 2004 – present
- Known for: My Dear Bootham

Abhilash, more popularly known as My Dear Bootham Abhilash is an Indian actor who has worked in television serials as well as films of Telugu and Tamil languages. Abhilash rose to prominence as the central character of Moosa in the Tamil serial My Dear Bhootham.

== Career ==
Abhilash made his debut with the Telugu serial Vichitra Katha Mallika, followed by the serials Veetuku Veedu Looti and Vikramadithyan. He also done the serials Magal, Gokulathil Seethai, Abirami and Kodi Mullai. Abhilash, a Bachelor of Computer Science, is best known for his role in My Dear Bhootham, but he has also worked as production controller for the films 465 and Nagesh Thiraiyarangam.

After playing the villain in Nagesh Thiraiyarangam, Abhilash played the lead role in Dhoni Kabadi Kuzhu and has produced Cinderella. Abhilash considers senior actor Vietnam Veedu Sundaram as his mentor.

== Filmography ==
- Note, all films are in Tamil, unless otherwise noted.

Year	Title	Role	Notes	Refs
2018	Nagesh Thiraiyarangam	Nagesh's brother		
2018	Dhoni Kabadi Kuzhu	Tharani		
2021	Cinderella	Kayamboo	Chief executive producer	
2025	Kudumbasthan	Manikchand		

== Television ==
Year	Title	Role	Network	Notes	Refs
2004	Vichitra Katha Mallika		Gemini TV	Telugu TV series	
2004	My Dear Bhootham	Moosa	Sun TV		
2008	Magal	Arun	Sun TV		
2010	Abirami		Kalaignar TV		
2010	Kodi Mullai		Raj TV		
