= Vijay Sathya =

Tamil film actor

- Born: Nagarcoil, Tamil Nadu, India
- Other name: Sathya (2008–2013)
- Occupation: Actor
- Years active: 2008–2013; 2024

Vijay Sathya (previously credited as Sathya) is an Indian actor who is known for playing lead roles in several low-key Tamil films during the late 2000s and early 2010s such as Valluvan Vasuki (2008), Sirithal Rasipen (2009), Nellu (2010) and Maharaja (2011). He also played a supporting role in Arumugam (2009).

He took a ten year hiatus and returned with Dhil Raja (2024), which started production in 2022.

== Career ==
Sathya was looking for opportunities and met several directors. During one such interaction, he met Marumalarchi Bharathi, who gave him the lead role in Valluvan Vasuki (2008). Regarding his performance in that film a critic wrote that "Sathya still has a long way to go in acting". Regarding his work in his next film Sirithal Rasipen, a critic noted that "Sathya is a bit stiff in some scenes but plays his part of the romantic lover well". He played Bharath's rich friend in Arumugam that same year. In 2010, he starred in Nellu. A critic wrote that "He is effective in the sequences where he takes on the rich and mighty". Another critic wrote that "Sathya is adequate as Kathir". His next films were Maharaja, Soozhnilai, Sandhithathum Sindhithathum, and the unreleased film Swasame.

He took a break from films and did an acting course in the United States. He returned to films with A. Venkatesh's Dhil Raja (2024) co-starring Sherin Shringar where he plays a fan of Rajinikanth. He developed six packs for his role in the film.

== Filmography ==
Year	Film	Role	Notes	Ref.
2008	Valluvan Vasuki	Valluvan		
2009	Sirithal Rasipen	Siddhu		
2009	Arumugam	Karthik		
2010	Nellu	Kathir		
2011	Maharaja	Aravind		
2012	Soozhnilai			
2013	Sandhithathum Sindhithathum	Selvam		
2024	Dhil Raja	Rajini Priyan		
