= Kuppathu Raja =

Kuppathu Raja may refer to:

- Kuppathu Raja (1979 film), an Indian Tamil-language film
- Kuppathu Raja (2019 film), an Indian Tamil-language action comedy-drama film
