= Soorappa =

- VCD Cover
- Directed by: Naganna
- Written by: Bharathi
- Produced by: I. D. Kamalakar; M. B. Babu; M. S. Suresh Babu; R. Jagadish
- Starring: Vishnuvardhan; Shruti; Charan Raj
- Cinematography: Ramesh Babu
- Edited by: Suresh Urs
- Music by: Hamsalekha
- Production company: Super Hit Films
- Release date: 27 March 2000
- Running time: 158 minutes
- Country: India
- Language: Kannada

Soorappa is a 2000 Indian Kannada-language action drama film directed by Naganna and produced by Super Hit Films. The film stars Vishnuvardhan in his 175th film along with Charan Raj and Shruti in prominent roles. The film had a musical score and soundtrack composed and written by Hamsalekha. The film is a remake of the Tamil film Maru Malarchi (1998), directed by Bharathi, which starred Mammootty and Devayani. The film was released to generally positive reviews from critics and was one of the biggest hits of the year 2000. Producer M. B. Babu was renamed Soorappa Babu after the success of this film.

== Cast ==
- Vishnuvardhan as Soorappa
- Shruti as Lakshmi
- Charan Raj as Balarama
- Ramesh Bhat as Babu
- Sathyapriya as Soorappa's mother
- Chi Guru Dutt
- Bank Janardhan
- M. N. Lakshmi Devi
- Tennis Krishna
- Anu Prabhakar (Cameo)
- Mandeep Roy
- Krishne Gowda

== Production ==
The film was shot mainly in outdoors of Mahadevapura, T.Narasipur, Balamuri, Srirangapattana in Mysore district.

== Soundtrack ==
The music of the film was composed and written by Hamsalekha.

Soorappa

Soundtrack album by Hamsalekha
- Released: 2000
- Genre: Feature film soundtrack
- Label: Magnasound

All lyrics are written by Hamsalekha.

No.	Title	Singer(s)	Length
1.	"Ee Mannige Naa Chiraruni"	S. P. Balasubrahmanyam
2.	"Sooryanobbane Chandranobbane"	S. P. Balasubrahmanyam
3.	"Yaaru Kaanada Sapthasagara"	Rajesh Krishnan, K. S. Chithra
4.	"Mangala Ragada"	Rajesh Krishnan, K. S. Chithra
5.	"Badavan Mane Oota Ruchiyammi"	Rajesh Krishnan, K. S. Chithra

== Reception ==
India Info wrote "Soorappa is a so-so film. A remake of Tamil super hit Marumalarchi which was made in Telugu as Sooryudu . The first half is moves at a snail's pace with no message or earthshaking incidents. It is only in the second half that is spanking. For able director Naganna and superstar Vishnuvardhan and sob queen Shruthi this film is a usual affair".
