= Paalooti Valartha Kili =

- Title card
- Directed by: Devaraj–Mohan
- Screenplay by: Vietnam Veedu Sundaram
- Based on: Raja Parambarai by Komal Swaminathan
- Produced by: P. Madhavan
- Starring: Vijayakumar; Sripriya
- Cinematography: Somasundaram
- Edited by: Devan
- Music by: Ilaiyaraaja
- Production company: Arun Prasad Movies
- Release date: 20 August 1976
- Country: India
- Language: Tamil

Paalooti Valartha Kili (transl. The parrot raised by being fed milk) is a 1976 Indian Tamil-language drama film directed by Devaraj–Mohan and written by Vietnam Veedu Sundaram. The film stars Vijayakumar and Sripriya, with Manorama, V. S. Raghavan, Y. G. Mahendran and Major Sundarrajan in supporting roles. It is based on the stage play Raja Parambarai (transl. Royal lineage) by Komal Swaminathan. The film was released on 20 August 1976.

== Cast ==
- Vijayakumar
- Sripriya
- Manorama
- V. S. Raghavan
- Y. G. Mahendran
- Major Sundarrajan

== Production ==
Paalooti Valartha Kili was based on the stage play Raja Parambarai by Komal Swaminathan. The film's screenplay was written by Vietnam Veedu Sundaram, and dialogues were written by Swaminathan. The title was derived from a song from Gauravam (1973).

== Soundtrack ==
The soundtrack was composed by Ilaiyaraaja. The songs "Naan Pesa Vandhen" and "Kola Kolaya" were hugely popular. "Naan Pesa Vandhen" was the first song that S. P. Balasubrahmanyam sang for Ilaiyaraaja. It is set in the Carnatic raga Khamas.

Track listing
| No. | Title | Singer(s) | Length |
|---|---|---|---|
| 1. | "Naan Pesa Vandhen" | S. P. Balasubrahmanyam, S. Janaki | 3:14 |
| 2. | "Kola Kolaya" | S. Janaki | 3:12 |
| 3. | "Vaadiyamma" | S. P. Balasubrahmanyam, P. Susheela | 3:18 |
| 4. | "Kola Kolaya" (Pathos) | S. Janaki | 3:32 |
| Total length: | | | 9:44 |

== Release and reception ==
Paalooti Valartha Kili was released on 20 August 1976. Kanthan of Kalki wrote the screenplay languishes like a flag waving to a fat horn, limping till the intermission only after that the roles are formed, it is less because the stage play is filmed as it is and concluded calling the film a play shot on camera.
