= Crazy Crazy Feeling =

2019 Telugu film

- Film poster
- Directed by: Sanjai Kartik
- Written by: Sanjai Kartik
- Produced by: Madhu Nuthalapati
- Starring: Viswant Duddumpudi; Pallak Lalwani
- Cinematography: Subhash Donthi
- Edited by: Mengana Srinu
- Music by: Bheems Ceciroleo
- Production company: Vignatha Films
- Release date: 1 March 2019
- Country: India
- Language: Telugu

Crazy Crazy Feeling is a 2019 Indian Telugu-language romantic comedy film directed by Sanjai Kartik and starring Viswant Duddumpudi and Pallak Lalwani in the lead roles. The film's title is based on a song from Nenu Sailaja (2016).

== Plot ==
The plot revolves around a youthful couple (Abhi and Spandana) who fall in love and problems that arise in their relationship.

== Cast ==
- Viswant Duddumpudi as Abhi
- Palak Lalwani as Spandana
- Vennela Kishore as Maheshwar Rao
- Sharanya Pradeep as Swapna
- Suman as Abhi's father
- Jaya Prakash Reddy as Dream father
- Posani Krishna Murali as Director PK
- Krishnam Raju as Writer
- Gundu Sudharshan
- Suman Shetty
- Bhadram
- Chammak Chandra

== Production ==
Ad film director Sanjai Kartik first narrated the script to Vijay Deverakonda after the release of Yevade Subramanyam (2015). Deverakonda was unable to sign the film due to his busy schedule and was replaced by Viswant Duddumpudi. Palak Lalwani was signed as the actress and Vennela Kishore for the comical portions.

== Release ==
The film was originally scheduled to release on 22 February.
