= Durlabh Prasad Ki Dusri Shadi =

Indian romantic comedy film

- Theatrical release poster
- Directed by: Siddhant Raj Singh
- Screenplay by: Prashant Singh
- Dialogues by: Adesh K Arjun
- Story by: Prashant Singh
- Produced by: Ekansh Bachchan; Harsha Bachchan; Co-Producer Ramit Thakur
- Starring: Sanjay Mishra; Mahima Chaudhary
- Cinematography: Anil Singh
- Edited by: Sanjay Sankla
- Music by: Anurag Saikia
- Production company: Eksha Entertainment
- Release date: 19 December 2025
- Country: India
- Language: Hindi

Durlabh Prasad Ki Dusri Shadi is a 2025 Indian Hindi-language romantic comedy film directed by Siddhant Raj Singh. It stars Sanjay Mishra and Mahima Chaudhary in the lead. This film is produced by Ekansh Bachchan and Harsha Bachchan, with Ramit Thakur as co-producer.

== Plot ==
The story follows Murli, a young man madly in love with Mehak. But there's one strange reason his marriage can't happen, there's no woman in his house. Her family refuses to send their daughter into a home without a female presence. Desperate to marry the love of his life, Murli comes up with an unexpected solution, he decides to get his widowed father, Durlabh Prasad, married again.

== Cast ==
- Sanjay Mishra as Durlabh Prasad
- Mahima Chaudhry as Babita
- Vyom as Murli
- Pallak Lalwani as Mehak
- Pravin Singh Sisodia as Brajnarayan Bharti
- Shrikant Verma as Ram Manch Prasad
- Abhay Anand Singh as Young Durlabh Prasad

== Reception ==
The film had a lukewarm reception in the press with multiple reviewers rating it 3 out of 5 stars, including Smita Srivastava of Dainik Jagran; Simran Singh of DNA; Vinamra Mathur of Firstpost, Jaya Dwivedi of India TV, and a reviewer for Deccan Chronicle.

Dhawal Roy of The Times of India gave the film 2.5 stars out of 5, while Rishabh Suri of Hindustan Times gave it 2 stars and said that "Durlabh Prasad Ki Dusri Shaadi is driven by good intentions, but intentions alone do not make for engaging cinema. What could have been a warm exploration of companionship ends up as a film that remains underwhelming in execution."

Amit Bhatia of ABP News called it a "pleasant, entertaining watch that balances humour with meaningful commentary."
