= Sixer (2019 film) =

2019 Tamil language romantic comedy film directed by Chachi

- Theatrical release poster
- Directed by: Chachi
- Written by: Chachi
- Screenplay by: Chachi
- Produced by: R. Dinesh Kannan; Sridhar; Anto L(Executive Producer)
- Starring: Vaibhav; Palak Lalwani; Sathish
- Cinematography: P. G. Muthiah
- Edited by: Jomin Mathew
- Music by: M. Ghibran
- Production companies: Trident Arts; Wallmate Entertainment
- Release date: 30 August 2019
- Running time: 120 minutes
- Country: India
- Language: Tamil

Sixer is a 2019 Indian Tamil language romantic action comedy film written and directed by Chachi, marking his directorial debut. The film stars Vaibhav and Palak Lalwani, with Sathish and Radha Ravi playing the supportive roles. M. Ghibran composed music for the film while cinematography was handled by P. G. Muthiah. The story of Sixer follows a person with night blindness, who faces difficulties in routine and love life because of his condition. The film was theatrically released on 30 August 2019. The film received positive reviews from critics.

== Plot ==
Aadhi (Vaibhav) is a civil engineer who lives a happy life with his cute family, consisting of his parents (Ilavarasu and Sriranjani). His biggest worry is his nyctalopia, as he cannot see anything after 6PM, so his marriage also becomes a big question mark.

For his own safety, Aadhi makes sure to get back to home before 6PM, but that is not the case on that day as his bike causes trouble near the beach, so he asks his close friend (Sathish) for help. In the meantime, the beach gets filled with protestors who revolt against a powerful politician and ex-goon (R. N. R. Manohar).

Unfortunately, the media, especially reporter Krithika (Palak Lalwani) mistakes Aadhi as the leader of the group which earns the wrath of the politician. On the personal front, Krithika falls in love with Aadhi. The rest of the film is all about how Aadhi manages to hide his flaws and marry Krithika, while also taking care of the criminal-turned politician.

== Cast ==
- Vaibhav as Aadhi
- Palak Lalwani as Krithika
- Sathish as Sathish
- Radha Ravi as Krithika's father
- R. N. R. Manohar as KP
- Ilavarasu as Aadhi's father
- Sriranjani as Aadhi's mother
- KPY Kuraishi as Venki, Aadhi's friend
- KPY Ramar as Chetta
- TSK as Aadhi's friend
- Chaams
- KPY Bala as Dokku (Chetta's henchman)
- Pugazh as a psychiatrist
- Geetha Narayanan as Krithika's mother
- "Angadi Theru" Sindhu as Chetta's wife
- Ashritha Sreedas as college student

== Production ==
The film titled Sixer would not be interrelated to the sport of cricket but filmmakers revealed that the term "six" plays major part in narration of the script. The titular poster of the film was launched on 9 March 2019 by popular film director Venkat Prabhu with the film wrapped up shooting during the same month.

== Soundtrack ==
Sixer

Soundtrack album by Ghibran
- Released: 19 August 2019
- Recorded: 2019
- Genre: Feature film soundtrack
- Language: Tamil
- Label: Muzik247

Ghibran chronology
Rakshasudu (2019)	Sixer (2019)	Saaho (2019)
External audio
- Audio Jukebox on YouTube

The soundtrack of the film is composed by Ghibran and lyrics are by GKB, Logan and Anu.

Track list
No.	Title	Lyrics	Singer(s)	Length
1.	"Engavena Kochikinu Po"	Logan	Ghibran and Sivakarthikeyan	04:19
2.	"Baa Baa Black Sheep"	GKB	Anirudh Ravichander	03:35
3.	"Pattaampoochi Kannalae"	S. N. Anuradha	Ghibran, Sowmiya Mahadevan	03:20

== Release ==
The film was theatrically released on 30 August 2019.

== Reception ==
Thinkal Menon of The Times of India rated the film two-and-a-half out of five stars and wrote, "Sixer has some of the necessary ingredients to entertain viewers, but the comedy works only in parts." S. Subhakeerthana of The Indian Express gave the film one out of five stars and wrote, "To be honest, Sixer doesn’t fall under the category of a ‘film’. It’s more like a mix and match of several film references (to name a few: Singaravelan and Thiruvannamalai) put together into a half-baked product."

Navein Darshan of Cinema Express wrote, "An interesting premise wasted by poor writing and execution, with dollops of objectionable crass humour". Sreedhar Pillai of Firstpost wrote, "Sixer is a typical time-pass movie that may provide some laughs for those nostalgic about 1980s Tamil cinema comedy tracks."

Anjana Shekar of The News Minute wrote, "With its meandering storyline and comedy reeking of homophobia and insensitivity, this comedy is best avoided." Srivatsan S. of The Hindu wrote, "Sixer also has a brief homophobic stretch that makes you squirm. Of course, the presence of a heroine (Pallak Lalwani) who cannot get a single word right in Tamil is more irking than Chachi’s tunnelled vision about nyctalopia among other things."
