= Vandae Maatharam =

- Poster in Malayalam
- Directed by: T. Aravind
- Written by: Henry; Tamil dialogues: R. N. R. Manohar
- Produced by: Henry
- Starring: Mammootty; Arjun; Sneha; Deepak Jethi
- Cinematography: Rajesh Yadav; M. V. Panneerselvam
- Edited by: G. Ramrao; V. M. Udhayashankar
- Music by: D. Imman
- Production company: Pangaj Productions
- Release dates: 10 September 2010 (Worldwide); 17 September 2010 (India)
- Country: India
- Languages: Malayalam; Tamil

Vandae Maatharam (transl. Mother, I bow to thee) is a 2010 Indian action film produced by Henry and directed by T. Aravind. The film stars Mammootty and Arjun in the lead roles, along with Sneha, Deepak Jethi, Raj Kapoor, Nassar, Jai Akash, Jagadish and Rajan P. Dev in supporting roles. It was simultaneously made and in Malayalam and Tamil.

The story revolves around two police officers, played by Mammootty and Arjun, who eliminate terrorists trying to cross the border. The film was released overseas on 10 September 2010 and later in India on 17 September.

== Plot ==
In a high-level meeting, top government officials analyse farmers' struggle and related social violence to put forward an amicable solution to have lasting harmony. Their plans are threatened by the terrorists' infiltrations.

Anandharaman IPS, Director IB, forms a task force to handle the imminent threat. Gopikrishnan IPS, Deputy Director IB, leads the anti-terror operation in the south zone. He recruits SSP Anwar Hussain IPS to lead the task force and interrogations. Nandini, an aviator, is Gopi's wife, and they are sad that they do not have a child. IB gets information from R&AW, the foreign intelligence agency, that a terrorist code named Malik (real name Abul Hassan) has infiltrated the country via sea border and has already killed a man in the process. A peculiar taqiyah obtained from the crime scene leads them to Sheikh Muhammad, a local heavyweight who in turn leads them to Balan, a man who deals in ship breaking. Balan, on severe and rigorous interrogation, reveals that Dr. Nayeem of the Metro Hospitals is their handler, and he is in contact with the terror command. When the team proceeds to arrest Nayeem, he commits suicide, where it is also revealed that he (Nayeem) had worked for the terrorist gang under the code name 'RJ-1'. Nayeem's mobile phone leads them to Malik. The IB command centre intercepts the call between Malik and his terrorist leader and cracks their plans to communicate via migratory birds. Following the information, Gopi, Anwar, and the team catch Malik.

A series of severe interrogative tortures do not break Malik, proving him immune to these, and fail to open him up or reveal any of his plans, for which Gopi and team tries to break him emotionally and psychologically, through drug treatment. Gopi finds a video of Malik showing his little daughter Kurshid. With this video background, they make changes in Malik's face and try to make him believe that he has been in a coma for 20 years. Since the IB agent who is supposed to play the role of Kurshid was KIA during another mission, Gopi decides to send Nandini (who is now pregnant) as Kurshid, to get Malik's emotional with sentiments and thus making him to speak out his plans. But Malik finds out this trap and kills Nandini and escapes, thus making Gopi furious. Finally, Gopi and Anwar catch Malik before he could execute his plans, and Gopi kills Malik in an encounter.

== Cast ==
- Mammootty as DIG Gopikrishnan IPS aka GK, Deputy Director IB
- Arjun as DIG Anwar Hussain IPS, an officer who assists GK in the mission (Voice dubbed by Shobi Thilakan in the Malayalam version)
- Mohan Sharma as Anadharaman IPS, Director IB
- Sneha as Nandini Gopikrishnan
- Deepak Jethi as 'Malik' Abul Hassan
- Mukhtar Khan as Terrorist Leader
- Nassar as Prime Minister Ram Gopal Varma
- Jagadish as Sheshadri, IB officer
- Jai Akash as Ashok, police officer
- Vijayakumar as SP Zachariah Oommen
- Rajan P. Dev as Dy. SP Mansoor
- Rajkapoor as Sheikh Muhammad
- Riyaz Khan as Balan
- Jayaprakash as Dr. Nayeem 'RJ-1'
- Rachana Mourya (item dancer in "One Two Three" song)
- Daisy Shah (item dancer in "Gala Gala Gala Gaaley" song)
- Snehan (special appearance in "Gala Gala Gala Gaaley" song)

== Production ==
Filming began in 2007. The film was shot at locations including Kochi, Chennai, Marthandam and Thengapattanam, with the climax being shot at Kanyakumari. While the Malayalam version was always titled Vandae Maatharam, the Tamil version was initially titled Aruvadai, as the former title was already registered by another producer. After that producer's registration to the title expired, Aruvadai was retitled to match the Malayalam version.

== Soundtrack ==
The soundtrack was composed by D. Imman.

Malayalam
No.	Title	Lyrics	Singer(s)	Length
1.	"Saaragiyil"	Vayalar Sarath Chandra Varma	Kalyani	5:00
2.	"Gala Gala Gala Gaaley"	Mankombu Gopalakrishnan	Jassie Gift, Roshini	4:24
3.	"One Two Three"	Mankombu Gopalakrishnan	Ramya, Farazuddin, D. Imman	4.39
4.	"Chirichonnurangum"	Vayalar Sarath Chandra Varma	Jyotsna	5:01
5.	"Vande Maatharam"	Vayalar Sarath Chandra Varma	Benny Dayal, Harish Raghavendra, Vijay Yesudas, Haricharan, Naresh Iyer, Krish, Pop Shalini, Mathangi, Srilekha Parthasarathy, Chinmayi	4:12
6.	"Intelligence Is The Keyword"	(Instrumental)	D. Imman on keyboard	2:02

Tamil
No.	Title	Lyrics	Singer(s)	Length
1.	"Vandhe Maatharam"	Vairamuthu	Benny Dayal, Harish Raghavendra, Vijay Yesudas, Haricharan, Naresh Iyer, Krish, Pop Shalini, Mathangi, Srilekha Parthasarathy, Chinmayi	4:12
2.	"Sanjeevana"	Snehan	Kalyani	5:00
3.	"One Two Three"	Nandala	D. Imman, Ramya, Farazuddin	4:39
4.	"Thirumbi Thirumbi"	Viveka	Suchith Suresan	5:01
5.	"Gala Gala Gala Gaaley"	Snehan	Jassie Gift, Roshini	4:24
6.	"Intelligence Is The Keyword"	(Instrumental)	D. Imman keyboard	2:02

== Release ==
The film was initially set to release on the eve of Ramzan, 10 September 2010 in both Tamil and Malayalam. At the last moment, it could not do so, however. Then, it was released on 17 September 2010.

== Critical reception ==
Sify gave the film 2/5 saying, "The done to death patriotic theme receives no fresh makeover in the film. If only it had paid more attention to that feeble script instead of raking up all that clatter and clamor on screen, would it have made more sense". Pavithra Srinivasan of Rediff.com wrote, "The plot is a good one, and the movie has its moments. Had Henry's screenplay shored it up with logic, Vande Mataram would have been more than just a choppy bash-fest".
