= Partner (2023 film) =

2023 Indian comedy drama film

- Theatrical release poster
- Directed by: Manoj Damodharan
- Written by: Manoj Damodharan
- Produced by: Goli Surya Prakash
- Starring: Aadhi Pinisetty; Hansika Motwani; Yogi Babu
- Cinematography: Shabeer Ahammed
- Edited by: Pradeep E. Ragav
- Music by: Santhosh Dhayanidhi
- Production company: Royal Fortuna Creations
- Release date: 25 August 2023
- Country: India
- Language: Tamil

Partner is a 2023 Indian Tamil-language science-fiction crime comedy film written and directed by Manoj Damodharan in his directorial debut. The film stars Aadhi Pinisetty, Hansika Motwani and Yogi Babu with Pallak Lalwani, Pandiarajan, Robo Shankar, John Vijay, Ravi Mariya, Tiger Thangadurai, Munishkanth, Rajendran, Myna Nandhini and Lollu Sabha Manohar in supporting roles.

== Cast ==
- Aadhi Pinisetty as Sridhar
- Hansika Motwani in dual role as
  - female Kalyan
  - unnamed person that Kalyan (Rajendran) meets in the end
- Yogi Babu as Kalyanaraman alias Kalyan, Sridhar's friend
  - Rajendran as Kalyan (after 2nd transformation)
- Pallak Lalwani as Priya, Sridhar's girlfriend
- Pandiarajan as Scientist Prathap, Priya's father
- John Vijay as John Vijay, Scientist's old student
- Ravi Mariya as Agnikunju, Minister
- Munishkanth as Vikravandi Vaigundam
- Robo Shankar as Samadhanam
- Tiger Thangadurai as Annadhanam
- Mahanadi Shankar as Inspector Om Saravanan
- Myna Nandhini as Sengamalam, Kalyan's ex-girlfriend
- Lollu Sabha Manohar as Guy in store
- Agastin as Black Berry
- Ashritha Sreedas as Amudha, Sridhar's sister
- Raman Raja as John Vijay’s nephew
- Lollu Sabha Swaminathan as Motorcycle driver
- Gowthami Vembunathan as Motorcycle driver's wife
- Supergood Subramani as Sridhar's father
- K. Bujju Babu as Driving instructor
- Sembaruthi Sanjay as Beggar
- Redin Kingsley as Narrator (voice)

== Production ==
Production on the film began in March 2019, with the project marking the debut of director Manoj Damodaran, who had previously apprenticed under A. Sarkunam. Reported as a comedy with a science-fiction fantasy element, Aadhi was signed on to play the lead role, with Hansika Motwani in a role that would not represent the "typical Tamil cinema heroine". Pallak Lalwani and Yogi Babu joined the team in further roles, with the makers hoping to complete and release the film within a period of six months.

The COVID-19 pandemic subsequently delayed the completion and release of the film, with the makers later preparing the film for a mid-2023 release. At the audio launch of the film in July 2023, alleged sexist comments made by comedian Robo Shankar were widely criticised.

== Music ==
The music for the film was composed by Santhosh Dhayanidhi. The song "Raati" composed for 7UP Madras Gig was reused.

Track listing
No.	Title	Lyrics	Singer(s)	Length
1.	"Moonji"	Madras Miran	Deva, Gana Balachandar	3:20
2.	"Raati"	Mohan Raja	Bamba Bakya, Swagatha	4:19
3.	"Aalana Vathikuchi"	Kabilan	Neeti Mohan	3:34
4.	"Colours of Love"	Kabilan	Shweta Mohan, Sean Roldan	4:18
5.	"Colours of Love (Reprise)"	Kabilan	Santhosh Dhayanidhi	2:25
Total length:				17:56

== Release and reception ==
The film was released on 25 August 2023.

Narayani M of Cinema Express gave it 2 out of 5 stars and wrote, "Partner could have worked well if there had been genuine efforts in writing good comedy." Logesh Balachandran of The Times of India gave the film 2 out of 5 stars and wrote, "Aadhi Pinisetty's Partner contributes to the collection of mindless comedic films in Tamil cinema that struggle to elicit genuine laughter."
