= Sirithal Rasipen =

- Directed by: V. Chandrasekaran
- Written by: V. Chandrasekaran
- Produced by: V. Chandrasekaran
- Starring: Sathya; Sunu Lakshmi
- Cinematography: Ramesh Azhagiri
- Edited by: Suresh Urs
- Music by: Iniyavan
- Production company: CBRH Films
- Release date: 3 July 2009
- Running time: 140 minutes
- Country: India
- Language: Tamil

Sirithal Rasipen (transl. I'll enjoy if you smile) is a 2009 Tamil language comedy film directed, written and produced by V. Chandrasekaran. The film stars Sathya and Sunu Lakshmi, alongside an ensemble cast of M. S. Bhaskar, Lakshmy Ramakrishnan, Manobala, Kalpana, Mayilsamy, Lollu Sabha Balaji, Sathyan, Ansiba Hassan, Thyagu, and Shanmugarajan, amongst others, in supporting roles. The film was released on 3 July 2009 and is a remake of the Malayalam film Sathyabhamakkoru Premalekhanam (1996).

== Plot ==
Boopathy Pandian (M. S. Bhaskar) is a strict father who uses the whip abundantly on anyone who disobeys him. His family includes his bedridden wife Lakshmy (Lakshmy Ramakrishnan); two good-for-nothing sons Rama (Mayilsamy) and Krishna (Lollu Sabha Balaji); two daughters-in-law; and two daughters. He is against love marriages since his own sister Eshwari (Kalpana) ran away with the sorcerer Vikramadithyan (Thyagu), who is now his archenemy. His younger daughter Divya (Sunu Lakshmi) is in love with Siddhu (Sathya), the son of the family manager (Manobala). At night, the lovers secretly meet without the authoritarian Boopathy knowing. Boopathy suspects Vikramadithyan's son Purushothaman (Sathyan) is stalking his daughter. When Boopathy threatens Vikramadithyan that he would whip him again as he did when Vikramadithyan married his sister, Vikramadithyan swears that his son will marry Divya at any cost.

One day, Boopathy finds out an unsigned love letter to Divya. Boopathy whips his daughter and suspects Purushothaman for writing it, but Purushothaman claims that he has never gone to school and that he is illiterate. Boopathy decides to hire rowdies to protect his daughter. Therefore, the four clumsy rowdies - Maaja (Mahanadi Shankar), Goda Govindan (Crane Manohar), Karadi (Bonda Mani), and Bruce Lee (Velmurugan) - come to his house. Boopathy then learns that Siddhu is Divya's lover and feels betrayed by Siddhu, for whom he had high regard. Thereafter, Boopathy meets his old friend Thangaraj (Shanmugarajan) and accepts for Divya to get married with Thangaraj's NRI son Rajendran (Kovai Babu). Later, Rajendran comes back home with his newlywed wife. The greedy Thangaraj, who wants all of Boopathy's wealth, drives his newlywed daughter-in-law away, and Rajendran accepts for the marriage. In the meantime, Boopathy's daughter Viji (Ansiba Hassan) elopes with Maaja, and they secretly get married.

The day of the wedding - with Purushothaman and his parents on one side and Siddhu with the four rowdies on the other - decide to stop the wedding between Divya and the greedy Rajendran. Divya pleaded with her sisters and mother to let her marry Siddhu. They accept and help her elope with Siddhu. Later, Lakshmy convinces Purushothaman to forget Divya. Therefore, Purushothaman decides to help Divya and Siddhu, but Boopathy, Thangaraj, and Rajendran are hell bent on stopping this elopement. Boopathy then realizes that Thangaraj and Rajendran tried to cheat him and cancels the wedding.

Many months later, Divya is happily married to Siddhu and is pregnant. Boopathy becomes a nice person and makes peace with Vikramadithyan.

== Cast ==
- Sathya as Siddhu
- Sunu Lakshmi as Divya
- M. S. Bhaskar as Boopathy Pandian
- Lakshmy Ramakrishnan as Lakshmy
- Manobala as Siddhu's father
- Kalpana as Eshwari
- Mayilsamy as Rama
- Lollu Sabha Balaji as Krishna
- Sathyan as Purushothaman
- Ansiba Hassan as Viji
- Thyagu as Vikramadithyan
- Shanmugarajan as Thangaraj
- Kovai Babu as Rajendran
- Mahanadi Shankar as Maaja
- Crane Manohar as Goda Govindan
- Bonda Mani as Karadi
- Velmurugan as Bruce Lee
- Singamuthu as Tea Master
- King Kong as Kaththi Kuththu Pandian
- Lekhasri as Kamala
- Ramya as Kavitha
- Chelladurai
- Vengal Rao as uncredited
- Shankar as Student (uncredited role)
- Babu as Henchman (uncredited role)

== Production ==
The film director and producer V. Chandrasekaran signed Sathya and newcomer Sunu Lakshmi to play the lead roles in the film. 12 comedians: M. S. Bhaskar, Thyagu, Manobala, Sathyan, Mahanadi Shankar, Mayilsamy, Lollu Sabha Balaji, Crane Manohar, Velmurugan, Bonda Mani, Singamuthu and King Kong were selected to act in this film. Apart from this, Shanmugarajan will act in an important role. Sirithal Rasipen has been shot extensively in Chalakudy, Courtallam and Guruvayur.

== Soundtrack ==
Sirithal Rasipen

Soundtrack album by Iniyavan
- Released: 25 June 2009
- Recorded: 2009
- Genre: Feature film soundtrack
- Length: 32:07
- Producer: Iniyavan

The film score and the soundtrack were composed by Iniyavan. The soundtrack, released on 25 June 2009, features 6 tracks with lyrics written by P. Vijay, Snehan, Yugabharathi and Annamalai.

Track	Song	Singer(s)	Duration
1	"Kanadicha Rosapoo"	Benny Dayal, Suchitra	5:07
2	"Chekka Chekka Sevathavele"	Prasanna, Chinmayi	5:14
3	"Enakulle Irupaval"	Hariharan, K. S. Chithra	6:12
4	"Pondattiyo Vappattiyo"	Iniyavan, Anuradha Sriram	4:40
5	"Aagayame Ingu Vanthu"	Karthik, Saindhavi	4:51
6	"Enakulle Irupavan"	Hariharan, K. S. Chithra	6:03

== Reception ==
Sify said, "fast paced action and never a dull moment make Sirithal Rasipen an interesting watch".
