= Meeravudan Krishna =

2012 Tamil film by Krishna

- Promotional poster
- Directed by: Krishna
- Starring: Krishna; Swetha Basu
- Cinematography: M. R. A. Vijay; S. P. S. Guhan
- Edited by: P. Sai Suresh
- Music by: K. K. Senthil Prasad
- Production company: Dwarakamai Creations
- Release date: 30 August 2012
- Running time: 150 minutes
- Country: India
- Language: Tamil

Meeravudan Krishna (transl. Krishna with Meera) is a 2012 Indian Tamil-language romantic drama film directed by Krishna, who stars in the film alongside Swetha Basu. The film revolves around family issues. It was released on 30 March 2012.

== Cast ==
- Krisshna as Krishna
- Swetha Basu as Meera
- Radha
- Manobala

== Reception ==
A critic from The Times of India gave the film a rating of one-and-a-half out of five stars and noted that "The feeling you are left with in the end is that of having watched eight episodes of a mega serial on the big screen without a break". Critics from Maalai Malar and Dinamalar criticised the film.
