= Enna Thavam Seitheno =

2018 Indian Tamil-language film

- Directed by: Murabasalan
- Written by: Murabasalan
- Produced by: S. Senthil Kumar
- Starring: Ghajini Murugan; Vishnupriya; R. N. R. Manohar
- Cinematography: E. J. Nauzad
- Edited by: Kalidass
- Music by: Dev Guru
- Production company: Inaintha Kaigal Kalaikoodam
- Release date: 22 June 2018
- Running time: 138 minutes
- Country: India
- Language: Tamil

Enna Thavam Seitheno (transl. What penance did I do?) is a 2018 Indian Tamil rural social comedy drama film written and directed by Murabasalan. The film stars newcomer Ghajini Murugan in the male lead role alongside Vishnupriya, while R. N. R. Manohar, Delhi Ganesh, and Power Star Srinivasan played supportive roles in the film. Dev Guru scored music for the film. The film was released on 22 June 2018 and received average reviews from the audience.

== Plot ==
A rich man in a village (R. N. R. Manohar) who is also a popular don murders people who are against him, and he has his only daughter (Vishnupriya). On a day, his enemies abduct his daughter and attempt to assault and abuse her. The village storekeeper, a Dalit youngster (Ghajini) then fights with the men who were attempting to abuse Vishnupriya and rescues her. Vishnupriya then falls in love with him for rescuing her and after a few days, the Dalit youngster too falls in love with her. Both of them secretly marry without the knowledge of the Vishnupriya's father. Eventually, Vishnupriya's father gets to know about his daughter's marriage and decides to kill both of them.

== Cast ==
- Ghajini Murugan
- Vishnupriya as Bhagyamati
- R. N. R. Manohar
- Power Star Srinivasan
- Delhi Ganesh
- Mayilsamy
- Singampuli
- Aarthi
- Aryan
- S. Senthilkumar
- Jayaraman
- Sangamitra
- Ilavarasi
- Gowri
- Usha
- Balasundari
- Murugan
- Raja
- Sathish
- Mohan

== Production ==
The director cast debutant Ghajini Murugan in the male lead role alongside Vishnupriya and the film was proceeded as a social drama film set in village areas with simple storyline.

During shooting of the film, actress Vishnupriya faced minor injuries after accidentally falling in the railway track as some portions of the film were shot close to railway lines.
