= Maanasthan =

- Poster
- Directed by: K. Bharathi
- Written by: K. Bharathi
- Produced by: K. Dhandapani
- Starring: Sarathkumar; Sakshi Shivanand
- Cinematography: Kichas
- Edited by: V. T. Vijayan
- Music by: S. A. Rajkumar
- Production company: Malar Combines
- Release date: 11 June 2004
- Running time: 152 minutes
- Country: India
- Language: Tamil

Maanasthan (transl. Man of self-respect) is a 2004 Indian Tamil-language romantic drama film directed by K. Bharathi. The film stars Sarathkumar and Sakshi Shivanand. Abbas, Vijayakumar and Sujatha play supporting roles. It was released on 11 June 2004.

== Plot ==
A rich landlord Ramasamy and his wife Lakshmi have two sons Deivarasu and Selvarasu. Deiva is an illiterate village bumpkin who is naive and is devoted to his family, gives a job to Pachakili who makes fun. Selva is a college student. Raasathi is Deiva's cousin and love interest and was betrothed to marry him since childhood. Deiva's family has a rivalry with Ramasamy's younger brother's family.

All is well until Deiva's maternal grandmother becomes severely ill. She meets with Ramasamy on her deathbed and reveals a secret: Deiva is not their child. During her delivery, Lakshmi's son was stillborn. As a result, Lakshmi's mother switched the stillborn baby with an infant Deiva, whom she found abandoned in a train latrine. This causes Ramasamy to kick out Deiva from his home and disown him, as Ramasamy is a staunch casteist. This causes the rich Deiva to become a pauper, but he loves his parents more than ever.

Meanwhile, Rasathi's brother arranges her wedding with Deiva's cousin, but she consumes poison and blackmails her family that she will die unless Deva marries her. Deiva marries her takes her to the hospital, but she dies on the way, devastating Deiva. Shortly after her funeral, Selva comes back home and heavily criticizes Ramasamy for mistreating Deiva. He leaves home to find Deiva and reunites with him. Later on, Ramasamy and Selva are kidnapped by Deiva's cousins and are blackmailed to sign over their properties. Deiva comes and rescues them. Ramasamy and entire village beg Deiva to return and take his place as Ramasamy's heir. However, Deiva refuses and leaves forever in a train latrine while everyone tries to look for him.

== Cast ==
- Sarathkumar as Deivarasu
- Sakshi Shivanand as Raasathi
- Abbas as Selvarasu
- Vadivelu as Pachakili
- Mansoor Ali Khan
- Vijayakumar as Pattamaniyar
- Sujatha as Pattamaniyar's wife
- Kaka Radhakrishnan
- Sukumari
- Shanthi Williams
- Radha as Selvarasu's love interest
- Rajesh
- Bonda Mani
- Dhamu as Selvarasu's Friend
- Vaiyapuri as Selvarasu's Friend
- Scissor Manohar as Selvarasu's Friend
- Chaplin Balu as Selvarasu's Friend

== Production ==
Prathyusha was supposed to pair with Abbas but due to her demise she was reported to have been replaced by Radha who earlier appeared in Sundhara Travels; however Bharathi later removed the love angle of Abbas from the film.

== Soundtrack ==
Soundtrack was composed by S. A. Rajkumar.

Song	Singers	Lyrics
"Aasavechen"	Swarnalatha, Srinivas	Nandalala
"Katha Katha"	K. S. Chithra	Pa. Vijay
"Pattu Jarikai"	Mano, P. Unnikrishnan	Kalaikumar
"Raasa Raasa"	K. S. Chithra, Hariharan	Nandalala
"Un E Mail" (Not in Film)	Sujatha, Devan	Pa. Vijay
"Vaada Thambi"	S. P. Balasubrahmanyam	Pa. Vijay

== Reception ==
Sify wrote "Manasthan is as stale as day before yesterday?s sambarand can be avoided." Visual Dasan of Kalki wrote that a fan who ignores Manasthan, where there is no innovation in anything be it cinematography, music or direction, is really a knowledgeable. K. N. Vijiyan of New Straits Times wrote, "If you like family-based stories, you are unlikely to be disappointed with Manasthan". Malathi Rangarajan of The Hindu wrote "THOUGH THE story dates back to the films of the 1960s when family drama ruled the roost and though the suspenseful parts are easily predictable, treatment and direction wise Malar Combines' "Maanasthan" passes muster".
