= Abirami =

Indian-Tamil-language soap opera

- Genre: Soap opera
- Written by: Sri. Narasimma (dialogue)
- Directed by: Mathivanan
- Creative director: Kutty Padmini
- Starring: Gautami; Shanthi Williams; Vietnam Veedu Sundaram; Kalpana
- Theme music composer: Mariya Manohar
- Opening theme: "Penninam Enbadhu" (Vocals); Tippu; Harini; Vinaitha; Srini; N. Muthu Vijayan (Lyrics)
- Country of origin: India
- Original language: Tamil
- No. of episodes: 198

Production
- Producers: Abirami Ramanathan; Keerthana Fanning
- Editor: Deepak Balaji R
- Camera setup: Multi-camera
- Running time: 20-22 minutes
- Production companies: Abhirami Mega Mall, Chennai Cine Times, Vikatan

Original release
- Network: Kalaignar TV
- Release: 18 January – 30 December 2010

Abirami is a 2010 Indian-Tamil-language soap opera starring Gautami, K.K, Shanthi Williams, Vietnam Veedu Sundaram and Kalpana. It aired Monday through Thursday 9:30PM (IST) on Kalaignar TV from 18 January 2010 through 30 December 2010 for 198 episodes. Actress Gautami player Abirami, Nandha and Saranya and the show was directed by Mathivanan, with the creative head being Kutty Padmini.

From 13 July 2015 the show was relaunched on Kalaignar TV and aired Monday through Friday at 18:30 (IST). Starting from Monday, 2 November 2015, the show was shifted to the 20:00 (IST) time slot. Starting from Monday 4 January 2016, the show was shifted to the 21:30 (IST) time slot.

== Plot ==
Abirami (Gautami) plays the protagonist, where she is a brave, bold and a beautiful woman who is typically a very straightforward person. She is against social injustice in society, and to women in particular. The serial features her fight against injustice, and her strategy in this fight.

== Cast ==
- Gautami as Abirami, Saranya and Nandha
- Krishna Kumar as Abhirami's husband
- Jayakrishnan
- Shyam as Saranya's husband
- Vietnam Veedu Sundaram
- Kalpana
- Shanthi Williams
- Gopi as Gopi
- Sathya Sai as Viji
- Ravi Raj as Subramani
- Krishnakumar
- Lakshmi
- Bhavani
- Saimantha
- Y. Vijaya
- Rajapriya as Anandhakalyani
- Rajasekar
- Manohar
- Sridhar
- Sivakavitha
- Kumareshan
- Arya Nepal
- My Dear Bootham Abhilash
- Harish
- Madhan Sundar

== Launching ==
The show was launching in Abhirami Mega Mall in Chennai. Tamil Film Actor Kamal Haasan was the chief guest at the event. Others present were the Producer's Council president Rama Narayanan, FEFSI chief VC Guhanathan, the Small Screen Actors' Association president Khushbu and Abirami Ramanathan.

== Original soundtrack ==
=== Title song ===
It was written by the lyricist Na. Muthukumar and composed by the music director Mariya Manohar.

=== Soundtrack ===
Track listing
No.	Title	Lyrics	Singer(s)	Length
1.	"Penninam Enbadhu (பெண் இனம் என்பது)"	Na. Muthukumar	Tippu, Harini, Vinaitha, Srini	3:34

== Airing history ==
The show started airing on Kalaignar TV on 18 January 2010 and It aired on Monday through Thursday 21:30 (IST). The channel started repeat aired from Monday 2 November 2015, the show was shifted to 20:00 (IST) time Slot. Starting from Monday 4 January 2016, the show was shifted to 21:30 (IST) time Slot.

Aired	Time	Episode
18 January 2010 - 30 December 2010	Monday - Thursday; 9:30PM (IST)	1-198
2 October 2015 - 1 January 2016	8:00PM (IST)	1-131 (R)
4 January 2016 - 4 August 2016	9:30PM (IST)	132-198 (R)

== Awards ==
Year	Award	Category	Recipient	Result
2017	Tamil Nadu State Television Awards for 2010	Best Dubbing artist Female	Renukha	Won

== International broadcast ==
The Series was released on 18 January 2010 on Kalaignar TV. The Show was also broadcast internationally on Channel's international distribution. It aired in Sri Lanka, Singapore, Malaysia, South East Asia, Middle East, Oceania, South Africa and Sub Saharan Africa on Kalaignar TV and also aired in the United States, Canada, Europe on Kalaignar Ayngaran TV. The show's episodes were released on Kalaignar TV YouTube channel.
