= Sinam (2022 film) =

- Directed by: G. N. R. Kumaravelan
- Written by: R. Saravanan
- Produced by: R. Vijayakumar
- Starring: Arun Vijay; Pallak Lalwani
- Cinematography: S. Gopinath
- Edited by: Raja Mohammad
- Music by: Shabir
- Production company: Movie Slides Pvt Ltd
- Release date: 16 September 2022
- Running time: 112 minutes
- Country: India
- Language: Tamil

Sinam (transl. Anger) is a 2022 Indian Tamil-language action thriller film directed by G. N. R. Kumaravelan. The film stars Arun Vijay and Pallak Lalwani in the lead roles. Shabir composed the soundtrack album and background score. The title of the film was announced on 6 November 2019. The film was released theatrically worldwide on 16 September 2022 to mixed reviews from critics but eventually flopped at the box office.

== Plot ==
Sub-Inspector Pari Venkat (Arun Vijay) is a righteous and fearless police officer who lives peacefully with his loving wife, Madhangi, and their young daughter. Pari believes in upholding justice and does not tolerate crime, even involving influential people.

One day, Madhangi leaves home to visit her parents in their hometown. However, she suddenly goes missing. Pari becomes worried when she doesn’t return or answer his calls. His worst fears come true when he finds out that Madhangi has been brutally raped and murdered, her body dumped in a desolate area. Completely shattered, Pari struggles with grief, but his pain soon turns into rage. Determined to bring the perpetrators to justice, he takes charge of the investigation despite being personally affected by the case.

As Pari starts piecing together the crime, he discovers shocking evidence pointing toward a larger conspiracy. He learns that Madhangi had unknowingly witnessed an illegal activity and was targeted to keep her silent. Further investigation reveals that a gang involved in sex trafficking and abuse is behind her murder. The perpetrators are not just normal criminals but have strong political and police connections, making it difficult for Pari to seek justice. The corrupt system tries to stop Pari from digging deeper, and his department warns him to step away from the case. But he refuses to give up.

Fueled by his grief and determination, Pari tracks down the criminals individually. He uses his intelligence and combat skills to fight against the corrupt system. He faces life-threatening situations but refuses to back down. In a thrilling climax, Pari uncovers the entire operation and exposes the main culprits behind the crime. He ensures that those responsible for Madhangi’s brutal murder get the punishment they deserve. The film ends on an emotional note, emphasizing justice, integrity, and the struggles faced by honest police officers in a corrupt system.

== Cast ==
- Arun Vijay as Sub-Inspector Paari Venkat
- Pallak Lalwani as Madhangi
- Kaali Venkat as Police Constable Kadal
- R. N. R. Manohar as Commissioner Velayudham
- Baby Desina as Paari Venkat's daughter
- K. S. G. Venkatesh as Rajamanickam, Madhangi’s father
- Rekha Suresh as Madhangi’s mother
- Marumalarchi Bharathi as Auto driver
- Tamizh as Jaga

== Production ==
The film was tentatively titled as AV30. On 6 November 2019, the title of the film was announced to be Sinam. The shooting of the film was wrapped up on 2 March 2020. It was also announced that Pallak Lalwani would be playing the female lead opposite Arun Vijay. On 20 November 2019, the makers unveiled the first look poster of the film coinciding with the eve of Arun Vijay's 42nd birthday. On 14 August 2020, the makers also released the second look poster of the film.

== Music ==
Sinam

Soundtrack album by Shabir
- Released: 2022
- Recorded: 2021–2022
- Genre: Feature film soundtrack
- Length: 15:21
- Language: Tamil
- Producer: Shabir

Shabir chronology
Raju Gari Gadhi 3 (2019)	Sinam (2022)

The film’s music is composed by Shabir.

Track listing
No.	Title	Lyrics	Singer(s)	Length
1.	"Solladi En Kanmani"	Thamizhanangu	Arun Vijay & Pavithra Shreedharan Nair	4:22
2.	"Maarum Nilai Maarum"	Priyan	Meenakshy Jyothish	3:29
3.	"Enakaana Siruvaanam"	Eknath	Revanth	4:27
4.	"Enil Paaindhidum Kaadhalae (Reprise)"	Madhan Karky	Shabir, Jonita Gandhi	4:23
5.	"Nenjellam"	Madhan Karky	G. V. Prakash Kumar, Sivaangi Krishnakumar	4:27
Total length:				21:15

== Release ==
=== Theatrical ===
The film was released theatrically worldwide on 16 September 2022. Earlier the makers had opted for direct release on OTT due to increase in COVID-19 cases, however Arun Vijay clarified that the film would release only in theatres. The trailer of the film was released on 31 August 2022.

=== Home media ===
The post-theatrical streaming rights of the film was bought by Netflix and the satellite rights of the film was bought by Kalaignar TV. The film was digitally streamed on Netflix from 10 November 2022.

== Reception ==
Logesh Balachandran of The Times of India rated 2.5 out of 5 stars and wrote "The investigative sequences in the second half lack depth and aren't intriguing enough." Navein Darshan of The New Indian Express rated the film 1.5 out of 5 stars and wrote "Sinam aims to be an emotionally stirring film, the absence of silence and a subtler score only disconnects the audience from the film". Haricharan Pudipeddi of Hindustan Times wrote "Sinam, with more sensitive writing, could’ve been a far more engaging thriller." Bhuvanesh Chandar of The Hindu wrote that "Sinam is the kind of movie that tires you to the extent you begin to not care to count its flaws." Dinamalar rated the film 2.75 out of 5.
