= Kallazhagar =

- Film poster
- Directed by: Bharathi
- Written by: Bharathi; Mahendran (dialogues)
- Produced by: Henry
- Starring: Vijayakanth; Laila
- Cinematography: Thangar Bachan
- Edited by: Peter Pappiah
- Music by: Deva
- Production company: Pangaj Productions
- Release date: 6 February 1999
- Running time: 141 minutes
- Country: India
- Language: Tamil

Kallazhagar (pronounced [kaɭɭːaɻaɡaɾ]) is a 1999 Indian Tamil-language action drama film directed by Bharathi, starring Vijayakanth and Laila. Nassar, Sonu Sood and Manivannan play other supporting roles, while Deva composed the score and soundtrack for the film. It was released on 6 February 1999. This is the Tamil debut of Laila and the debut of Sonu Sood.

== Plot ==
In Alagar Kovil village, Andal, from a young age, has been enamored with Lord Kallazhagar, inspired by the stories her grandmother shared about the deity. As she blossoms into a teenager, she desires to marry Kallazhagar. Though the villagers ridicule her aspiration, Andal remains resolute. Her friend Gowri, daughter of the temple's chief priest, Periya Bhattar, offers support. The arrival of Kamalakannan, a mahout, and his elephant at the temple sparks a new development. Andal is immediately smitten with Kamalakannan, envisioning him as the embodiment of the God she has always idolised. Kamalakannan befriends Mani, another mahout, at the temple. Haunted by his mysterious past, Kamalakannan struggles with sleepless nights.

When thieves attempt to steal the temple's jewels, attacking the assistant priest, Sowmya Narayana, Kamalakannan bravely apprehends the culprits and retrieves the stolen jewels, and Andal and her grandmother tend to Kamalakannan's wounds. Andal confesses her willingness to sacrifice her life if she cannot marry Kamalakannan and also gifts new attire to Kamalakannan and Mani, embracing Mani as a brother and seeking his assistance in uniting her with Kamalakannan. When Mani's elephant runs amok, Kamalakannan skilfully calms the beast, showcasing his exceptional expertise as a mahout. Andal witnesses Kamalakannan performing namaz and is shocked to discover he is a Muslim. Confronting him angrily, she demands he reveal his past. Kamalakannan begins to recount his story.

Originally named Kamaluddin, he recounts his newlywed sister, Saira's husband Jamal's involvement in terrorism. Kamaluddin confronted Jamal and his associates, defeating them and imprisoning them. Kamaluddin's father urged him to prevent a bomb blast planned at the Alagarkovil festival at all costs. Kamaluddin joined forces with Peter, a former bomb squad specialist who had lost his family to terrorism. Initially, Peter refused to co-operate but eventually agreed to join the mission. To thwart the bomb blast, Kamaluddin became a Hindu, adopting the name Kamalakannan, and dedicated himself to guarding the temple. Meanwhile, Kamaluddin's father suffered a fatal heart attack, but Kamaluddin refused to return for his funeral, honouring his father's promise to complete the mission.

As the Alagarkovil festival commences, Kamaluddin and Peter intensify their search for the bomb, scouring nearby villages to prevent the impending disaster. As Peter concludes that no evidence of a bomb blast plot exists, Gowri, Periya Bhattar's daughter, reveals that she saw a similar map in Narayana's possession. Periya Bhattar discloses that he recently met Sowmya Narayana in Rishikesh but knows little about him. Narayana is exposed as a trained terrorist tasked with orchestrating a bombing in Tamil Nadu. He plants multiple waterproof bombs in water pots, disregarding the pleas of his accomplices, who fear the devastating consequences. When one terrorist objects, Narayana brutally kills him, witnessed by Andal.

Narayana chases and assaults Andal, prompting Kamaluddin to confront and defeat him and his cohorts. Peter and his team successfully defuse the bombs, ensuring the festival procession concludes without incident. Tragically, Andal succumbs to her injuries and dies. Kamaluddin chooses to remain in Alagarkovil village, embracing his identity as Kamalakannan, the man Andal loved.

== Cast ==
- Vijayakanth as Kamaluddin and Kamalakannan
- Laila as Andal
- Manivannan as Mani, a fellow mahout
- Nassar as Peter
- Thilakan as Kamaluddin's father
- Major Sundarrajan as Periya Bhattar, chief priest
- Ashwini as Saira, Kamaluddin's sister
- Sumithra as Kamaluddin's mother
- S. N. Lakshmi as Andal's grandmother
- Riyaz Khan as Jamal, Kamaluddin's brother-in-law
- Vaiyapuri as Govindankutti, Kamalakannan's assistant
- Crane Manohar as Karuppusamy, Mani's assistant
- R. N. R. Manohar as Rajagopalan, a reformed terrorist
- Scissor Manohar as a terrorist
- John Babu as a dancer
- R. R. Sheela as a dancer
- Sonu Sood as Sowmya Narayana, an assistant priest
- Bharathi as a Narikurava tribe man
- Rocky Rajesh
- Vengal Rao as a thief

== Production ==
Laila, who had appeared in other regional Indian films, opted to make her debut in Tamil films with Kallazhagar after she had previously rejected a string of other Tamil offers including VIP (1997). The actress also turned down a role in Unnai Thedi (1999), insistent that Kallazhagar should be her first release. Early reports had suggested that Hindi actor Dilip Kumar would also be a part of the cast, but he eventually did not feature.

An elephant called Appu was brought in from Thrissur in Kerala, where the elephant formed one of a stable maintained by the famed Paaramekaavu temple, which forms the venue of the yearly Thrissur Pooram festival. A few scenes from the film were shot at the Kallazhagar temple in Madurai, but crowd trouble meant that the makers chose to finish the shoot in sets. For a particular song in the film, Russian dancers were imported to dance alongside Laila. As the film marked music composer Deva's 250th album, the film industry felicitated him with a ceremony at the Kamarajar Arangam.

== Soundtrack ==
The music was composed by Deva. The song "Varraru Varraru" became hugely popular and is frequently played during Chithirai festival at Madurai.

Song	Singers	Lyrics
"Azhaga Kallazhaga"	Arundhati	Vairamuthu
"Chinna Vayasule"	K. J. Yesudas	Nandalala
"Oh Manalea"	S. P. B. Charan, Anuradha Sriram	Nandalala
"Thoonda Thoonda"	K. S. Chithra, Krishnaraj	Thamarai
"Vaararu Vaararu"	Deva, S. A. Rajkumar	Vairamuthu
Azhaga Kallazhaga (film version)	K. S. Chithra	Vairamuthu

== Release and reception ==
The film was initially scheduled to release on 14 January 1999 coinciding with the festival of Pongal, but became delayed due to problems at the censor board. The film was rejected by the board, because of its potential to spark religious conflicts – with particularly a scene in which some Muslim extremists masquerade as religious Hindus and join in the celebration of a major festival in a temple – being highlighted as a concern. The team subsequently had to adapt the concept partially.

Lavanya of Deccan Herald wrote, "Vijay Kanth, Purathchi Kalainjan' is quite awful. Nazir as the bomb expert is okay. Major Soundar Rajan as the chief priest is quite good". D. S. Ramanujam of The Hindu wrote, "Tackling the ticklish question of the growing bomb culture and terrorist activities involving a particular community, is like walking on the mine field", adding that the director "denounces such a `culture' in clear-cut terms" in the film, "though the solutions he and the author of the story, offer are weak and highly cinematic in content". La. Ganesan, general secretary of BJP reviewing for Kalki, praised the film for speaking against terrorism, Mahendran's dialogues and called it a film which can be watched by everyone from different religions. The success of the film prompted the producer Henry to sign Vijayakanth for his next film. The film also created demand for Laila as a lead heroine and she shortly after signed on to appear in a role in Mudhalvan (1999).
