= Pallak Lalwani =

Indian actress

Palak Lalwani
- Born: 1 January 1998 (age 28); Allahbad
- Occupation: Actor
- Years active: 2016–present
- Parent(s): Jiten Lalwani; Dipika Lalwani

Palak Lalwani (born 1 January 1998) is an Indian actress who appears in Tamil and Telugu-language films.

== Early life ==
Her father Jiten Lalwani is an Indian television actor who works in Hindi language television series.

== Career ==
She made her debut with the Telugu film Abbayitho Ammayi with Naga Shourya. In 2018, Palak Lalwani featured in a music video Dil Zaffran along with Rahat Fateh Ali Khan, composed by Ravi Shankar and directed by Kamal Chandra.

In March 2019, Lalwani starred in Crazy Crazy Feeling with Viswant Duddumpudi. She made her Tamil debut in Baba Bhaskar's Kuppathu Raja in 2019. Lalwani played a North Madras girl in the film. Later that year, she played a journalist in Sixer with Vaibhav. She starred in Sinam (2022) with Arun Vijay and Partner (2023) with Aadhi Pinisetty and Hansika Motwani.

== Filmography ==
Key
†	Denotes films that have not yet been released

Year	Film	Role	Language	Notes	Ref.
2016	Abbayitho Ammayi	Prardhana	Telugu		
2018	Juvva	Shruthi	Telugu		
2019	Crazy Crazy Feeling	Spandana	Telugu		
2019	Kuppathu Raja	Kamala	Tamil		
2019	Sixer	Krithika	Tamil		
2022	Sinam	Madhangi	Tamil		
2022	Faraaz	Tarika	Hindi		
2023	Thalainagaram 2	Sitara	Tamil		
2023	Partner	Priya	Tamil		
2023	Bhagavanth Kesari	Reporter	Telugu	Cameo Appearance	
2025	Durlabh Prasad Ki Dusri Shadi	Mehak	Hindi		

=== Music videos ===
Year	Title	Music	Language	Ref.
2018	Dil Zaffran	Ravi Shankar	Hindi	
