= Valluvan Vasuki =

2008 Indian film

- Directed by: K. Bharathi
- Produced by: A. M. Vasan; V. S. Kumaran
- Starring: Ranjith; Ponvannan; Sathya; Shwetha Bandekar
- Cinematography: K. P. Rajoosh
- Edited by: Peter Babiyaa
- Music by: S. A. Rajkumar
- Production company: Kamalam Kalaikoodam
- Release date: 15 February 2008
- Country: India
- Language: Tamil

Valluvan Vasuki is a 2008 Indian Tamil-language romantic drama film directed by K. Bharathi and starring Ranjith, Ponvannan, Sathya, and Shwetha Bandekar. The story is about the Konar dynasty and much of the shooting was done in villages bordering the Kollidam River in Thanjavur district. It was released on 15 February 2008.

== Plot ==
Valluvan and Vasuki fall deeply in love with each other, but their families are strictly against their union. However, the two are determined to fight all odds to be together.

== Cast ==
- Ranjith as Anandha Konar
- Ponvannan as Thalaivar
- Sathya as Valluvan
- Shwetha Bandekar as Vasuki
- Kuyili as Thalaivar's wife
- Seetha as Anandha Konar's wife
- Vasu Vikram
- Benjamin
- Rajappa as Anandha Konar's friend
- Vadivukkarasi
- Kalairani
- K. Bharathi as Kalyanam
- Muthukaalai
- Suja Varunee
- Bonda Mani
- Tirupur Ramasamy

== Soundtrack ==
The music was composed by S. A. Rajkumar.

Song	Singers	Lyrics
Nenje Nenje	Hariharan	S. A. Rajkumar
Oothikittathu	S. A. Rajkumar	S. A. Rajkumar
Thamarapoo	Saindhavi	Pa. Vijay
Sollaama I	Karthik, Harini	Pa. Vijay
Sollaama II	Karthik, Priya Himesh	Pa. Vijay
Oor Oranga	Shweta Mohan, Tippu	Pa. Vijay

== Reception ==
S. R. Ashok Kumar of The Hindu wrote, "The lead players, including the veterans, is noteworthy. The music certainly enhances the proceedings. And the camera has done its bit. So what really is the weak link in this film? The screenplay, which is a total let down. It dashes the hopes of the audience and the producer".
