= Dhil Raja =

Indian action drama film

- Theatrical release poster
- Directed by: A. Venkatesh
- Produced by: Kovai Bala
- Starring: Vijay Sathya; Sherin Shringar
- Cinematography: Mano V. Narayana
- Edited by: Suresh Urs
- Music by: Amresh Ganesh
- Production company: Golden Eagle Studio's
- Release date: 27 September 2024
- Country: India
- Language: Tamil

Dhil Raja (transl. King of Guts/Courage) is a 2024 Indian Tamil-language action drama film written and directed by A. Venkatesh. The film stars Vijay Sathya and Sherin Shringar in lead roles.

== Cast ==
- Vijay Sathya as Rajini Priyan
- Sherin Shringar as Arnanti
- A. Venkatesh
- Vanitha Vijayakumar
- Imman Annachi
- Karate Raja
- Samyukta
- KPY Bala
- G. Gnanasambandan
- Ammu
- Lollu Sabha Manohar
- C. Ranganathan
- Mookkuthy Murugan
- Scissor Manohar
- Amresh Ganesh in a special appearance

== Production ==
The film began production in 2022 under the title Rajini. Vijay Sathya plays a Rajinikanth fan in the film. Initially, Kainaat Arora was considered to play the heroine before she was replaced by Sherin Shringar. Sathya developed six packs for his role in the film.

== Soundtrack ==
Dhil Raja

Soundtrack album by Amresh Ganesh
- Released: 2024
- Genre: Feature film soundtrack
- Length: 8:10
- Language: Tamil
- Label: Lahari Music
- Producer: Amresh Ganesh

Amresh Ganesh chronology
Pambattam (2024)	Dhil Raja (2024)

The soundtrack was composed by Amresh Ganesh.

Track listing
No.	Title	Lyrics	Singer(s)	Length
1.	"Thuru Thuru Kangal"	Lavarathan	Sid Sriram	3:49
2.	"Saamy Kuthu"	Kalai Kumar	Anthony Daasan, Amresh Ganesh	4:21
Total length:				8:10

== Release ==
The film was released on 27 September 2024.

== Reception ==
RK Spark of Zee News stated that Vijay Satya does well in the fight scenes throughout the film, his action adds strength to the film. Chennai Vision wrote, "The film is fast-paced with no dull moments, keeping the audience thoroughly engaged. The tight screenplay ensures a thrilling ride from start to finish, making this an impressive debut for Vijay Sathya and an entertaining film overall". Maalai Malar wrote that although the first half of the film is exciting, it is a pity that it is not the same in the second half and that perhaps more attention should have been paid to the screenplay.
