= R. N. R. Manohar =

Indian actor and film director (died 2021)

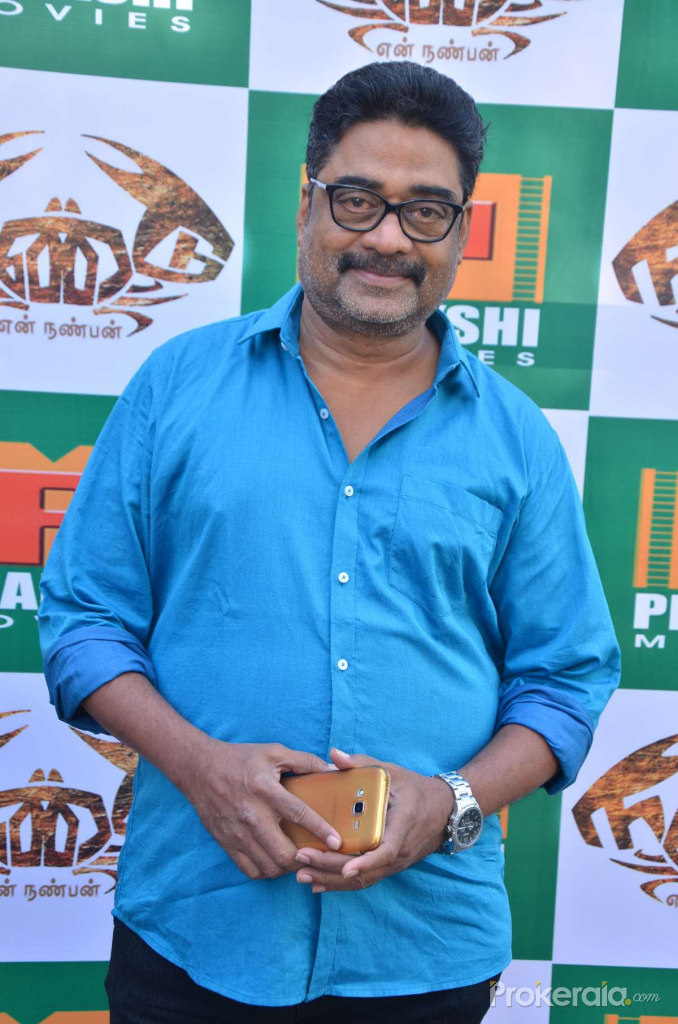
- Born: 17 May 1967; Madras State (now Tamil Nadu), India
- Died: 17 November 2021 (aged 54); Chennai, Tamil Nadu, India
- Occupations: Actor, film director
- Years active: 1978–2021

R. N. R. Manohar (17 May 1967 – 17 November 2021) was an Indian actor and director. He directed films like Maasilamani (2009) and Vellore Maavattam (2011).

== Career ==
In 2002, Manohar announced that he would direct a film titled Velu featuring Prashanth and Simran in the lead role, though the film later did not materialise.

He made his directorial debut with Maasilamani.

== Death ==
Manohar died on 17 November 2021, at a hospital in Chennai from COVID-19 complications during the COVID-19 pandemic in India. He was 54 years old.

== Filmography ==
=== As director and writer ===
Year	Film	Credited as		Notes
Year	Film	Director	Writer	Notes
1994	Maindhan	Assistant	Yes	
1995	Kolangal	Assistant	Yes	
1998	Pudhumai Pithan	Assistant	Yes	
2003	Thennavan	No	Yes	
2003	Punnagai Poove	No	Yes	
2009	Maasilamani	Yes	Yes	
2010	Vandae Maatharam	No	Dialogue	Bilingual film; Tamil version only
2011	Vellore Maavattam	Yes	Yes	

=== As actor ===
Year	Title	Role	Notes
1992	Senbaga Thottam		
1995	Kolangal	Madhavan	Also co-director
1999	Kallazhagar		Also co-director
2001	Dhill		
2003	Thennavan	Nagappa	
2006	Don Chera	"Royapuram" Bava	
2007	Sabari	Manohar	
2008	Sutta Pazham	Church father	
2013	Ya Ya	Seetha's father	
2014	Veeram	Maanikkam	
2014	Salim	Thavapooniam	
2014	Kaadu		
2015	Yennai Arindhaal	Sathyadev's uncle	
2015	Naanum Rowdy Dhaan	Thalaivar	
2015	Vedalam	Corrupt Police Officer	
2015	Eetti	Sampath	
2016	Miruthan	Minister	
2016	Aarathu Sinam	Minister	
2016	Aandavan Kattalai	Minister	
2016	Achcham Enbadhu Madamaiyada	Mahesh's father	
2016	Sahasam Swasaga Sagipo	Mahesh's father	Telugu film
2017	Theeran Adhigaaram Ondru	Minister	
2017	Enakku Vaaitha Adimaigal	Krishna's father	
2017	Kavan	Thilak's father	
2017	Rubaai		
2017	Puyala Kelambi Varom		
2017	Pichuva Kaththi		
2018	Veera	Maavattam Thamizhazhagan	
2018	Paadam	Principal	
2018	Kaala Koothu	Gayathri's father	
2018	Enna Thavam Seitheno	Village gangster	
2019	Viswasam	Thookudurai's uncle	
2019	Aghavan		
2019	Kanchana 3	Shankar's friend	
2019	Ayogya	Advocate	
2019	Kuppathu Raja	Kai Saamman's father	
2019	Kaappaan	Member of Parliament	
2019	Sixer	Politician	
2019	Kaithi	Senior Police Officer	Uncredited role
2020	Adavi	Estate owner	
2020	Seeru	MLA	
2020	Nungambakkam	Director General of Police	
2020	Naanga Romba Busy	Meera's father	
2021	V		
2021	Bhoomi	Judge	
2021	Teddy	Purushottaman	
2021	4 Sorry		Anthology film; first segment
2021	Enemy	Police Officer	Posthumous release
2022	FIR	Perumal	Posthumous release
2022	Veeramae Vaagai Soodum	Kaatamuthu	Posthumous release
2022	Etharkkum Thunindhavan	Aaron's father	Posthumous release
2022	Idiot	Smitha's father	Posthumous release
2022	O2	Ex-MLA	Posthumous release
2022	Sinam	Commissioner Velayudham	Posthumous release
2022	DSP	MLA Aalamarathan	Posthumous release
2022	Yugi	Opposition party leader	Uncredited role; posthumous release
2022	Therkathi Veeran	R. N. R. Manohar	Posthumous release
2022	Mofussil	Police Inspector	Posthumous release
2023	Memories		Posthumous release
2023	Katradhu Mara		Posthumous release
2023	Ghosty		Posthumous release
2023	Rayar Parambarai		Posthumous release

=== Television ===
Year	Title	Role	Channel	Language	Notes
2022	Vilangu	Kodilingam	ZEE5	Tamil	Web-Series; Posthumous release
