= Idhayam Thiraiarangam =

2012 Indian film by Ramki Ramakrishnan

- Directed by: Ramki Ramakrishnan
- Written by: Ramki Ramakrishnan
- Produced by: Tamil Film Corporation
- Starring: Anand; Shwetha Bandekar
- Cinematography: N. Ravi
- Edited by: V. J. Sabu Joseph
- Music by: Maria Manohar
- Production company: Tamil Cinema Corporation
- Distributed by: Own Release
- Release date: 1 June 2012
- Running time: 130 minutes
- Country: India
- Language: Tamil

Idhayam Thiraiarangam (transl. Heart theatre) is a 2012 Tamil language romantic drama film directed by Ramki Ramakrishnan, starring Anand and Shwetha Bandekar in the lead roles.

== Cast ==
- Anand as Kumar
- Shwetha Bandekar as Mahalakshmi
- Kavitha as Appu
- Kadhal Sukumar as Kumar's friend
- Valentina
- Manobala
- Bala Singh
- Annadurai
- Alex
- Ghajini Rajesh
- Master Rahul
- Anjali Devi
- Padmashree
- Geetha
- K. Rajan
- Vinod Sagar as Kumar's coworker (uncredited)

== Soundtrack ==
The music was composed by Maria Manohar and features lyrics by Viveka, Muthu Vijayan and SAC. Raamkhi.

== Release and reception ==
The film was released on 1 June 2012 alongside Thadaiyara Thaakka, Mayanginen Thayanginen and Manam Kothi Paravai.

Malini Mannath of The New Indian Express wrote that "Idhayam... offers nothing novel or exciting for the viewers". A critic from Sify opined that "If you decide to see the film, go armed with loads of patience. For its dim-witted writing and sloppy direction, Idhayam Thiraiarangam is ultimately a tiresome watch".
