= Magal (TV series) =

Indian television series

- மகள்
- Genre: Soap opera
- Created by: Nimbus Television
- Screenplay by: R. Narayanan; Francis Bapu
- Directed by: Francis Bapu
- Starring: Meenakumari; Chandra Lakshman; Sulakshana; Kamalesh; Varalakshmi; Rishi; Bindhu Madhavi; Hemalatha; Rami Reddy; Abilash
- Theme music composer: Rajesh Vaidhya (Title Song); Jai Kishan (Background Score)
- Opening theme: "Aariraro Aariraro"; Srinivas (Vocal); Palani Bharathi (Lyrics)
- Country of origin: India
- Original language: Tamil
- No. of seasons: 1
- No. of episodes: 1015

Production
- Producer: Akash Khurana
- Cinematography: KPS.Suriyan
- Editor: B. Ramesh Lal
- Running time: approx. 20-22 minutes per episode 11:00AM >> 10:30AM
- Production company: Nimbus Television

Original release
- Network: Sun TV
- Release: 8 October 2007 – 14 October 2011

Magal is a 2007 Indian Tamil-language morning soap opera that aired Monday through Friday on Sun TV from 8 October 2007 to 14 October 2011 for 1015 episodes. It was highly praised in TRP ratings of Tamil serials. This show starred Meenakumari, Chandra Lakshman, Sulakshana, Kamalesh, Varalakshmi and Rishi. It was produced by Akash Khurana of Nimbus Television and directed by Francis Bapu. It also aired in Sri Lanka on the Tamil channel Vasantham TV.

== Plot ==
This story revolves around a young woman named Kaveri (Meenakumari) and her family. She had finished college and went to work in a nursing home as a nurse. Her impoverished family includes her parents, three sisters and a brother. Her brother and father were indolent. She helped run the family. One big sister Padma (Yokini) worked in the shop, while sisters Priya (Kaviya) and Revathy (Dhanalakshmi) studied in college.

Kaveri loved and married Karthick (Rishikesh). But Eashwari (Varalakshmi), daughter of Naggapan (Ramy Reddy), also loved Karthick and took revenge on both Karthick and Kaveri. Radhidevi breaks the family into more problems. Kaveri faces the issues and starts a business with her husband.

This series took various types of stories in episodes between (500- till the end) with more important characters. Later, Shakthi (Chandra Lakshman) who was a strong woman, helps Kaveri take revenge on Easwari. In the last episode, Karthick killed Eashwari's father and went to jail. After that, Ravi (Karthick's brother and Shakthi's husband) is killed by Eashwari; then Shakthi took the gun and shot and killed Eashwari. Shakthi went to jail and showed in the last episode, after eight years, they both came out from prison and their children's born and their ages of 10 years and they returned to their work.

This series shows that women are very strong Magal (Daughter). It had been praised high in TRP ratings of Tamil serial and received high praise from viewers.

== Cast ==
=== Main cast ===
- Meenakumari as Kaveri Saravanan
- Chandra Lakshman as Shakthi Ram
- Rishi Keshavan as Saravanan
- Sulakshana as Savitri (Died in the serial Episode of 568)
- Abhilash as Arun
- Kavya as Priya
- Revathy Priya as Anitha Srinivasan
- Dhanalakshmi as Revathy
- Kamalesh as Shanmugam
- Hemalatha as Janani
- Varalakshmi as Eshwari
- Snekha Eshwar as Lakshmi Priya
- Aravind Katharae as Aravindh
- Shridhar as Srinivasan

=== Others ===
- Rami Reddy as Nagappan (Eashwari's brother, died in the serial)
- J. Lalitha as Amman
- Vatsala Rajagopal as Rajeshwari
- Vanaja as Gayatri
- Jayalakshmi.B as Sweety
- Shwetha Bandekar as Swapna
- Priya as Madhavi
- Shwetha as Swarubini
- Murali as Raj Kumar
- Sri Lekha as Paramaeshwari
- Kovai Papu as Padmanabhan
- Kowsalya Sendhamarai as Radha
- Yokini as Padma
- Revathy Priya as Anitha
- Swetha
- Suhashini as Deepika
- Vijay Krishunaraj
- Sai Prashanth as Raam(Shakthi's Love interest)
- Banu Prakash
- Nesan
- Bindhu Madhavi
- Senthilnathan
- Vatsala Rajagopal
- Rajashree
- C.N. Ravishankaran
- Haripriya
- Arun Prakash
- Vislani
- Muralidharan
- S.P.Senthilvelan
- Rathna Kumar
- Sumangali
- Maleeswari
- Jay
- Amirthakadesan
- Bhagathavastsala
- Sundari
- Vasanth
- Kalyan
- B. Lenin
- Deepika
- Ashiq
- Vijiketi
- Murali
- Yek Raj
- R. Sindhu
- Kothai Naachiyar
- Balaji
- Rajkumar Manoharan
- Sendhil
- Selva Kumar
- Kumaresan
- Udumalai Ravi

== Title track ==
The title track of this series was sung by Srinivas. The music for this title track was composed by Rajhesh Vaidhya while the background music score was done by Jai Kishan.

== See also ==
- List of TV shows aired on Sun TV (India)
