= Muthuswami =

Muthuswami is both a given name and a surname. Notable people with the name include:

- Muthuswami Dikshitar (1776–1835), South Indian poet
- Mahesh Muthuswami, Indian cinematographer
