= Sandhithathum Sindhithathum =

2013 Indian film by Balu Anand

- Theatrical release poster
- Directed by: Balu Anand
- Produced by: Nammakal T. Sibi Chakravarthi
- Starring: Sathya; Yudasha; Kumarajan; Shobaraj
- Cinematography: Freddy J David
- Music by: Sabesh–Murali
- Production company: Sibi Sam Cine Arts
- Release date: 13 December 2013
- Running time: 130 minutes
- Country: India
- Language: Tamil

Sandhithathum Sindhithathum (transl. Meeting and thinking) is a 2013 Indian Tamil-language romantic thriller film directed by Balu Anand and starring Sathya, Yudasha, Kumarajan, and Shobaraj. The film is based on a true incident that happened in Bangalore and Namakkal. The film resurfaced in the news in 2021 after Kumarajan's death.

== Cast ==
- Sathya as Selvam
- Yudasha as Gopika
- Kumarajan as Kumaresan
- Ganja Karuppu
- Nizhalgal Ravi
- Shobaraj as Kempe Gowda
- L. Raja as Devaraj
- Sabitha Anand as Kumaresan's mother
- Riythvika as Kumaresan's sister
- Sharmili
- Mithra Kurian as Aravind's coworker
- Balu Anand
- Kadhal Saravanan
- King Kong
- Kottachi

== Production ==
Balu Anand returned to direction with this film after a long hiatus.

== Reception ==
The Times of India wrote, "It has elements for a decent thriller but we are forced to sit through mundane scenes and insufferable acting, not to mention out-of-the-blue songs". Maalai Malar gave a negative review.
