= Kannukku Kannaga =

- DVD cover
- Directed by: S. Dhayalan
- Produced by: Henry
- Starring: Murali; Devayani; Raja
- Cinematography: Thangar Bachan
- Edited by: K. Thanigachalam
- Music by: Deva
- Production company: Pangaj Productions
- Release date: 26 October 2000
- Running time: 130 minutes
- Country: India
- Language: Tamil

Kannukku Kannaga (transl. An eye for an eye) is a 2000 Indian Tamil-language drama film directed by S. Dhayalan in his debut. It stars Murali, Devayani, Vindhya and Raja. The film was released on 26 October 2000.

== Plot ==
Dharma and Devi are siblings that care for each other very deeply, almost inseparably so. Devi is secretly in love with Arun, which is kept a secret from Dharma.

One day, Dharma takes his sister to a walk, where he then announces the matches he has found for her and shows her the photographs of the men, all of whom are successful but very far from home. She tears the photographs, explaining that she cannot go so far without her brother and that she'd marry anyone as long as she's in her brother's sight and he apologises, saying that he'll find a suitor close to them. Awhile after that, Arun proposes to her in the form of a drawing, only for her to tear it up and say that their love can never happen and she would be married to the suitor that Dharma chose for her. Selvi overhears this and relays this information to Dharma, who later confronts Devi about this but accepts it nonetheless.

Dharma goes to the priest, asking him when they can keep the marriage. The priest tells that the marriage shouldn't happen. After relentless pressure, he says that it's because Dharma would die the day the couple's male child turns five. There's no cure whatsoever, so it would be a certain event. When Dharma arrives home, he overhears Devi's declaration where she'd do anything for her brother. Scene then cuts to the marriage.

Dharma goes to the temple and prays for a female child but the child is eventually born and it's a boy. In a few days after the incident, a heavy log nearly hits him, signalling him that his death count has started. Dharma goes to Selvi's father and tells that it's best if they do not marry and discloses the truth to Selvi after a lot of pressure. She goes and pleads to find a cure to the priest, but the priest said the same thing to her as he told Dharma.

The relationship between Arul and Dharma, alongside Arul and Devi, deteriorates every day. Even more so when Dharma is accused of killing Vijay (their son) due to a series of misunderstandings. It reaches to a point where Dharma accidentally shoots Vijay on the shoulder, which prompts her to become suspicious so she moves away. One day, it all unravels and all misunderstandings get cleared--along with the fact that her brother was going to die as soon as her boy turns five.

After this knowledge, to save Dharma, Devi asks her son whether he'd die for her uncle, to which he says yes. They poison themselves while Dharma is sleeping. Vijay records this on a tape and places it near Dharma, who listens to the tape and searches for them. While looking for Devi and Vijay, Dharma is hit by an arrow. He finds Vijay and Devi and takes them to the hospital to save their lives. Both Vijay and Devi are saved, but Dharma's condition becomes critical. His heart stops, but the doctors manage to resuscitate him with CPR.

== Cast ==
- Murali as Dharma
- Devayani as Devi
- Raja as Arun
- Vindhya as Selvi
- Vadivelu as Velu
- Charuhasan as the astrologer
- Anu Mohan as Arun's father
- Kumarimuthu as Perumal
- K. K. Soundar as Selvi's father
- Scissor Manohar
- Master Vasanth as Vijay
- Master Udayaraj as Vijay's friend

== Production ==
Director Dhayalan had earlier worked as an assistant to K. S. Ravikumar, after having been recommended to his team by R. B. Choudary. Producer Henry and Dhayalan initially approached Sathyaraj for the lead role, but the actor mentioned being tired of village-centric roles. Later Vijayakanth and R. Sarathkumar refused the film, citing date issues. Through cinematographer Thangar Bachan, the team successfully approached Murali.

== Soundtrack ==
The soundtrack was composed by Deva.

Song	Singer(s)	Lyrics	Duration
"Anandam Anandam"	P. Unnikrishnan, Sujatha, Krishnaraj	Muthulingam	4:59
"Computer Graphic Pennukullae"	Anuradha Sriram	Vaali	4:30
"Kaveri Aathangarai Oram"	Deva	Muthulingam	5:09
"Sama Kulir Adikkuthu"	S. Janaki, Krishnaraj	Kalidasan	4:17
"Thulli Thulli Mazhaithulli"	Sujatha	Nandalala	5:20

== Critical reception ==
Savitha Padmanabhan of The Hindu said, "This domestic drama suffers because of the lack of originality and exaggerated sentiments." Malini Mannath of Chennai Online wrote, "Take a few handkerchiefs when you go to see the film [...] Not that the film is a bad one. It has a neatly paced first half". India Info wrote, "In this high voltage melodrama the casualty is the viewers sensibility and once it reaches the crescendo in the climax then the viewers will have to see their horoscope to find out whether they are going through a bad patch and do amends to avoid such trash films in future". The reviewer added, "Devyani gets the cake for giving a high melodrama. Murali with his slur and rustic looks is the same as in any other village films. Deva's music is a washout. Thankar Pachan saves his reputation as cameraman in this film by capturing the charm of countryside". Dinakaran wrote, "The story is rich in family sentiments. The astrological warnings sound as an over-threatening affair. The climax which establishes that doctors could overpower the designs of astrology is a satisfying experience". Saraswathi Srinivas of Sify wrote, "`Kannukku Kannaka` is replete with traumatic stuff, hardly the fare suitable for a joyous occasion like Diwali".
