= Arumugam (film) =

- Poster
- Directed by: Suresh Krissna
- Written by: Rashid Premji
- Produced by: Chida.Shenbaga Kumar
- Starring: Bharath; Priyamani
- Cinematography: K. Boopathy
- Edited by: Mu. Kasi Vishwanathan
- Music by: Deva
- Production company: Kool Productions
- Release date: 25 September 2009
- Country: India
- Language: Tamil

Arumugam (transl. Six Faces) (Note: Also the title character.) is a 2009 Indian Tamil-language masala film directed by Suresh Krissna and written by Rashid Premji. The film stars Bharath in the titular role alongside Priyamani, Ramya Krishnan, Saranya Mohan, Sathya, and Karunas play supporting roles. The music was composed by Deva. The film was released on 25 September 2009.

== Plot ==
Arumugam makes a living selling idlis on a roadside platform shop along with his father, sister Mallika, and sidekick. Arumugam is in love with his childhood sweetheart Yamini His best friend is the rich Karthik, whose sister is an arrogant tycoon Malini Devi. She and her uncle hate Karthik's deep bonding with Arumugam, who she finds to be below her stature. Malini, through her machinations, is able to separate the friends and bring Arumugam to the streets. Arumugam, after his mother's grave is bulldozed and Mallika is humiliated, vows to bring Malini to the streets. Due to his hard work and smart moves, he becomes the richest man in the town and takes his revenge.

== Cast ==
- Bharath as Arumugam
- Priyamani as Yamini
- Ramya Krishnan as Malini Devi
- Saranya Mohan as Mallika (Arumugam's sister)
- Sathya as Karthik (Arumugam's friend and Malini's brother)
- Sara Alambara as Karthik's wife
- Karunas as Arumugam's sidekick
- Ilavarasu as Arumugam's father
- Seetha as Arumugam's mother
- Pithamagan Mahadevan as Malini's uncle
- Abhinay as Karthik, Aarumugan's lawyer
- Mayilsamy as O. C. Idly Customer
- Kavithalayaa Krishnan
- Manobala
- K. Natraj
- Cool Suresh
- Apollo Ravi

== Production ==
Filming began in September 2008 at Hyderabad Film City, with a song sequence featuring set costing ₹30 lakh (equivalent to ₹91 lakh or US$95,000 in 2026) being shot in this schedule.

== Soundtrack ==
Soundtrack was composed by Deva.

Song	Singers	Lyrics	Length
Aarumugam	Deva, Shankar Mahadevan	Perarasu	05:11
Yamini	Hariharan, Sadhana Sargam	Pa. Vijay	05:43
Salona	Udit Narayan, Sonu Kakkar	Pa. Vijay	05:03
Endhan Rajadhi	Mahalakshmi Iyer	Pa. Vijay	03:11
Oru Poongatru	Mahalakshmi Iyer, Shankar Mahadevan	Pa. Vijay	03:23
Rendu Rendu	Suraj, Madhushree	Pa. Vijay	04:52

== Release and reception ==
Arumugam was released on 25 September 2009. Sify called it a blatant lift of the director's own Annaamalai (1992) and added, "The film makes you feel suffocated and every scene is predictable. There are no surprise twists or turns in the narration". Pavithra Srinivasan from Rediff.com labelled the film as a "ridiculous fare", giving it merely 0.5 out of 5 stars.
