= Kolangal (1995 film) =

- DVD cover
- Directed by: I. V. Sasi
- Written by: R. N. R. Manohar (dialogues)
- Screenplay by: I. V. Sasi
- Story by: Henry
- Produced by: Henry
- Starring: Jayaram; Khushbu
- Cinematography: V. Jayaram
- Edited by: K. Narayanan
- Music by: Ilaiyaraaja
- Production company: Carolina Films
- Release date: 15 September 1995
- Running time: 145 minutes
- Country: India
- Language: Tamil

Kolangal is a 1995 Indian Tamil-language drama film directed by I. V. Sasi. The film stars Jayaram and Khushbu. It was released on 15 September 1995. This was Sasi's final Tamil film as a director.

== Plot ==
Ganga, a Tamil girl who does not know Hindi, looks for her friend Malini in Mumbai. She then meets Bairavan, a Tamil man, who says that he knows Malini and Bairavan then sells Ganga to a brothel. The Tamil Nadu Police raids at the brothel to rescue Tamil women and they save most of them including the innocent Ganga.

Anand, a police officer, is worried about Ganga and she tells him about her past. After Ganga's father died, Ganga lived in her sister's house but her brother-in-law tried to rape her. She left the house and decided to go to Mumbai. So, Anand drops Ganga in her sister's house and to Anand's surprise, her angry brother-in-law beat her in front of him. Anand intervenes and saves her. Anand secretly marries her.

Anand's family is a traditional Hindu joint family and they all live in a bungalow. He has a widowed mother Karpagam, a bachelor uncle Sundarapandi, an elder brother Shankar and a sister-in-law Archana who have two children, a little brother Vijay who loves Sangeetha and a little sister Uma who loves Rajesh. Everybody blesses the young couple except Archana who wanted Anand to marry her sister Anjali. Soon, Bairavan surfaces and begins to blackmail Anand. Anand manages it intelligently but his family finds out that Ganga was in a brothel. It leads the entire family into a trauma. What transpires later forms the crux of the story.

== Cast ==
- Jayaram as Anand
- Khushbu as Ganga
- Raghuvaran as Bairavan
- Raja as Rajesh
- Kasthuri as Uma
- Sarath Babu as Shankar
- Vaishnavi as Archana
- Sanjay as Vijay
- Sanghavi as Sangeetha
- K. R. Vijaya as Karpagam
- R. Sundarrajan as Sundarapandi
- Senthil as Muruga
- Vasuki as Anjali
- Nassar
- Nizhalgal Ravi as Ganga's brother-in-law
- Delhi Ganesh as Raghunatha Sethupathi, Rajesh's father
- Vijaya Chandrika as Rajesh's mother
- Sharmili as Saroja
- Kumarimuthu
- R. N. R. Manohar as Madhavan, a journalist

== Production ==
The film was initially set to be directed by Bharathan, who was later replaced by I. V. Sasi. During production, reports emerged that Sasi was to be replaced by Pratap Pothen and that Arvind Swamy was set to join the cast, but no changes were made.

== Soundtrack ==
The music was composed by Ilaiyaraaja, with lyrics written by Vaali.

Song	Singer(s)	Duration
"Mouna Raagam"	S. Janaki	5:16
"Nethu Paathaale"	Mano, S. Janaki	7:01
"Oru Koottil"	Mano, Lekha	5:10
"Tamizhan Padaichu"	Mano, K. S. Chithra	5:04
"Therke Veesum"	Arunmozhi, Lekha	5:47
"Ullaasa Poongathre"	K. S. Chithra	4:54

== Reception ==
Thulasi of Kalki praised the film for its story, simple and natural dialogues, lively characters and cinematography. D. S. Ramanujam of The Hindu wrote, "The seasoned director I.V. Sasi resorts to oft-repeated situations in the first portion where the heroine meets hostile elements in the house. Kushbu and Jairam, teamed again, carry much of the acting burden, Kushbu shedding copious tears most times and Jairam taking a mighty swing at the yellow journalism, the dialogue of R.N.R. Manohar being biting and full of vigour here". The film won the Tamil Nadu State Film Award for Second Best Film, and Khushbu won for Best Actress.
