= Maharaja (2011 film) =

- Theatrical release poster
- Directed by: D. Manoharan
- Written by: D. Manoharan
- Produced by: J. Ravi
- Starring: Nassar; Sathya; Anjali
- Cinematography: V. Lakshmapathy
- Edited by: P. Sai Suresh
- Music by: D. Imman
- Production company: Jeyaram Company
- Release date: 30 December 2011
- Country: India
- Language: Tamil

Maharaja (transl. Great king) is a 2011 Indian Tamil-language film written and directed by Manoharan and produced by J. Ravi. The film stars Nassar, Sathya and Anjali. The music was composed by D. Imman.

== Synopsis ==
Mahadevan is a middle-aged government employee who leads a very normal family life with his wife, son, and father. He lives a budget life, rides an old scooter, wears out-of-fashion clothes, and bears a sullen expression on his face for all the reasons above. He is unhappy with his present life, which is monotonous, and feels that he should live a modernized life which he has missed in his earlier life. In this day and age, with westernization overpowering everything else, he is constantly reminded of a flame that died out long ago, and it questions the purpose of his existence. Meanwhile, Aravind, who comes from America, has a modern lifestyle. He works in a software company in Chennai. Mahadevan happens to meet Aravind and learns that he is his nephew. Both of them become very close. Aravind helps Mahadevan enjoy the modern life, which causes Mahadevan's family to suffer greatly with his activities. However, Aravind turns a new lease of life when he falls for Priya. He changes his poor characters for his love. Aravind comes to understand the real life and feels that he would only spoil his uncle's life. How he helps his uncle through this midlife crisis forms the rest of the story.

== Cast ==
- Nassar as Mahadevan
- Sathya as Aravind
- Anjali as Priya
- Saranya as Seetha
- Anita Hassanandani
- Karunas as Maadasamy aka OneTen
- Kovai Sarala as Bujji
- M. S. Viswanathan as Aravind's grandfather
- Vennira Aadai Moorthy
- Ajay Rathnam
- M. S. Narayana as Subbu
- Bayilvan Ranganathan as Traffic police officer

== Production ==
The film was launched in March 2009 with Nassar being roped in by the debutant director Manoharan to star in the lead role, with the veteran actor allotting 35 days to shoot for the film, four times as lengthy as he would offer for other roles. Sathya, Anjali and Anita Hassanandani were roped in to essay other leading roles in the film while Karunas and Saranya were selected to play supporting roles. The film was briefly delayed before remaining portions were completed in Malaysia in a 40-day schedule by December 2010. The film was planned as a Tamil-Telugu bilingual film although the Telugu version was never released until in 2022, under the title Musalodiki Dasara Pandaga.

== Soundtrack ==
The film score and soundtrack for Maharaja was composed by D. Imman. The album consists of six tracks, featuring lyrics penned by Na. Muthukumar, P. Vijay, Snehan, Dr. Kiruthiya, Yugabharathi, and Viveka.

Maharaja

Soundtrack album by D. Imman
- Released: 14 December 2011
- Genre: Film soundtrack
- Language: Tamil

D. Imman chronology
Uchithanai Muharnthaal (2011)	Maharaja (2011)	Manam Kothi Paravai (2012)

No.	Title	Lyrics	Singer(s)	Length
1.	"Adida Dammaaram"	Viveka	D. Imman, Roshini	4:17
2.	"Are Dhammare"	Kirithiya	Neha Bhasin, Ananthu	4:33
3.	"Hello Nanbaa"	Pa. Vijay	Vijay Yesudas	5:09
4.	"Mexi Mexican Lady"	Na. Muthukumar	Hariharan	4:51
5.	"My Name Is Raju Baby"	Snehan	Benny Dayal, Nassar, Sricharan	4:54
6.	"Raaja Raaja Mahaaraaja"	Yugabharathi	Karthik, M. L. R. Karthikeyan, Solar Sai	4:53

== Release ==
The film remained unreleased for a year, before hitting screens on 30 December 2011.
