= Naan Than Bala =

2014 Indian film by Kannan

- Directed by: Kannan
- Produced by: J. A. Lawrence
- Starring: Vivek; Shwetha Bandekar; Venkatraj J
- Cinematography: Azhagiya Manavalan
- Music by: Venkat Krishi
- Production company: SSS Entertainments
- Release date: 13 June 2014
- Country: India
- Language: Tamil

Naan Than Bala (transl. I am Bala) is a 2014 Tamil-language crime drama film directed by Kannan and produced by J. A. Lawrence under SSS Entertainments. Vivek plays the film's lead role. The film released on 13 June 2014.

== Plot ==
Bala, a poor priest, lives in an agraharam in Kumbakonam, looking after his aged parents and performing puja at a Perumal temple. Circumstances force him to accept help from a hired killer named Poochi to save his father from a jail sentence. Life takes an unfortunate turn for Bala. Unable to bear the taunts of the neighbours, Bala's parents commit suicide. Bala is forced to leave the agraharam. He begins a new life with Poochi in Kancheepuram. Vaishali, a young Saurashtrian who sells poli on the streets, comes into Bala's life. Soon they get engaged. Meanwhile, a close friendship develops between Bala and Poochi. Bala learns of Poochi's true identity. The police are desperate to hunt down Poochi. Bala is a good influence on Poochi, and he reforms a cold-hearted killer. The second half is all about whether their friendship survives this war of principles.

== Cast ==
- Vivek as Bala
- Venkatraj J as Poochi
- Shwetha Bandekar as Vaishali
- Cell Murugan as Thomas Alva Edison
- Thennavan as Kattooran
- Lavanya
- Sujatha Sivakumar
- Mayilsamy
- Ravi Mariya
- Ganesh Gopalan as Auto Driver

== Production ==
Kannan had approached Vivek with the script and the team began preliminary work in June 2013. In November 2013, Vivek confirmed filming had started and stated he would portray the role of a Hindu priest at a Perumal temple in Kumbakonam, who gets into a relationship with a local thug. He said that he opted to move away from his usual comedy roles after being advised by director Bala and Kamal Haasan. During production, the media wrongly reported that R. Kannan who had made Settai (2013) was director of the film. He later clarified it was not him but R. Kannan, who is the younger brother of screenwriter R. Selvaraj, and who previously directed Raasaiyya (1995).

== Music ==
Song title	Singers	Lyricist
"Thiru Vai"	Priyadarshini	Vaali
"Uyire Unakkaga"	Srinivas, Priyadarshini	Na. Muthukumar
"Amma Romba"	Baby Lokeswari Prabhu	Na. Muthukumar
"Ariyama"	Madhu Balakrishnan	Na. Muthukumar
"Bhojanam"	Priya sisters	Traditional
"Kanmani Penmani"	Priya sisters	Na. Muthukumar
"Eruna Rayiluthan"	Haricharan, Suchitra	Ilaiyakammban

== Reception ==
Baradwaj Rangan from The Hindu wrote, "Naan Than Bala should have been shattering drama. That it isn't is a function of the usual problems of our cinema — sketchy performances in the supporting parts, flavourless romance, comedy that constantly undermines the film's seriousness, lazy contrivances, mood-killing songs and an over-the-top ending". The Times of India gave the film 2 stars out of 5 and wrote, "There is juicy melodrama in-built in the story of Naan Than Bala but the writing and direction are plain amateurish. The trouble is that the director, Kannan, never really has a grip on this material...Kannan's treatment of this material is at best TV serial melodrama". IANS gave 2.5 stars out of 5 and wrote, "Shoddy writing and direction makes Naan Than Bala a boring film despite good intention". The New Indian Express wrote, "The plot did have the potential to turn into an intriguing play-out of human inadequacies and emotions. But the director fails to capitalise on it". Silverscreen.in wrote, "There is nothing wrong with the premise in itself : a simple tale of amity between a Hindu priest and a hardened criminal, but there is a lot wrong with the execution".
