= Juvva =

2018 Telugu film

- Film poster
- Directed by: Trikoti Peta
- Written by: M Ratnam
- Produced by: Bharath Somi
- Starring: Ranjith Somi; Palak Lalwani
- Cinematography: Suresh
- Edited by: Kotagiri Venkateswara Rao
- Music by: M. M. Keeravani
- Production company: SOMMI Films
- Release date: 23 February 2018
- Country: India
- Language: Telugu

Juvva (transl. Rocket) is a 2018 Telugu-language romantic action comedy film directed by Trikoti Peta, starring Ranjith Somi and Palak Lalwani in the lead roles.

== Cast ==
- Ranjith Somi as Rana
- Palak Lalwani as Shruthi aka Aadhya
- Ranjith Velayudhan as Basavaraj Patil
- Murali Sharma as CI Viswanath, Shruthi's uncle
- Sana as Viswanath's wife
- Ali as Dr Alia Bhatt
- Anand as Sivakrishna Hegde, Shruthi's father
- Saptagiri as Rana's friend
- Posani Krishna Murali as Pydiraju
- Surekha Vani as Shyamala, Pydiraju's wife
- Raghu Babu as Bhogam
- Kalpa Latha as Bhogam's wife
- Prabhakar as Bhikshupati
- Prabhas Sreenu as a goon
- Himaja
- Bhadram

== Production ==
The film began production under the name JinthTha Tha, but S. S. Rajamouli and M. M. Keeravani advised the director to change the title because of its similarity to a song from Vikramarkudu (2006) will make the audience think that the film stars Ravi Teja. Debutant Ranjith Somi, who previously starred in Nuvvu Nenu Okkatavudam, was signed as the main actor. The film is produced by Ranjith Somi's brother, Bharath Somi. Malayalam actor Arjun plays a negative role in this film, which will mark his Telugu debut. Chiranjeevi released the film's teaser.

== Reception ==
A critic from Telangana Today wrote that "Even after being a sensible story, direction and screenplay fail to turn the movie into a gripping one".
