= Nellu (2010 film) =

- Poster
- Directed by: Shiva Shankar
- Produced by: B. Senthil Kumar
- Starring: Sathya; Bhagyanjali
- Cinematography: Senthil Rajan
- Music by: S. S. Kumaran
- Production company: Karthik Jaya Movies
- Release date: 24 December 2010
- Country: India
- Language: Tamil

Nellu (transl. Unhusked rice) is a 2010 Indian Tamil language drama film written and directed by M. Shiva Shankar. It stars Sathya and debutante Bhagyanjali in the lead roles, while Senthil Rajan handled the camera and S. S. Kumaran composed the music. The film is based on the Kilvenmani massacre incident that happened in 1968.

== Cast ==
- Sathya as Kathir
- Anjali Nair as Thamara
- Karthik Jai as the tea stall owner
- OAK Sundar as a village landlord
- Kaali Venkat as Kaalimuthu
- Vasu Vikram
- Singamuthu as an astrologer
- Bava Lakshmanan
- Crane Manohar
- Bonda Mani

== Soundtrack ==
The music of the film is composed by S. S. Kumaran. Lyrics are written by Thamarai and Na. Muthukumar.

Song title	Singers
"Achu Vellam"	Prasanna, Chandran, SS Kumaran, Rajeev
"Kadhal Jodi Onnu"	Srimathi, Aadhavan, Srimathumitha
"Kannakkol Thiruda"	Silambarasan, Saindhavi
"Kodiyodu Thamara Poo"	Chinmayi, Kaushik, SS Kumaran
"Muthu Muthu"	Mahathi, SS Kumaran, Yash Golcha

== Release and reception ==
The film was originally denied a certificate by the Central Board of Film Certification who alleged "it explicitly dealt with caste conflicts".

Malathi Rangarajan of The Hindu opined that "The subject is interesting, but treatment goes awry". A critic from The New Indian Express wrote that "Nellu could have been a poignant depiction of a relevant issue and happening. But the director lets go the chance". Sify criticised the filmmakers for making a mainstream, populist film disguised as a documentary and also felt the editing suffered due to censorship.
