= Dhoni Kabadi Kuzhu =

2018 Indian Tamil-language sports drama film by P. Iyyappan

- Film poster
- Directed by: P. Iyyappan
- Produced by: S. Nandakumar
- Starring: Abhilash; Leema Babu; Thenaali
- Music by: Roshan Joseph
- Release date: 7 December 2018
- Running time: 110 minutes
- Country: India
- Language: Tamil

Dhoni Kabadi Kuzhu (lit. 'Dhoni Kabaddi team') is a 2018 Indian Tamil language sports drama film written and directed by P. Iyyappan on his directorial debut. The film stars Abhilash and Leema Babu in the main lead roles. The film is based on the clash of two sports cricket and kabaddi. The film had its theatrical release on 7 December 2018 and received extremely negative reviews from the critics. The film was described as an awful discredit to the sport of kabaddi. Song lyrics written by Na.Rasa

== Synopsis ==
Tharani (Abhilash) and his friends who are die ardent fans of MS Dhoni, do nothing for a living except for playing gully cricket in their local ground. On one day they realized that their playground has been sold to a local goon/gangster and had to reclaim it by paying whopping Rs3 lakhs within a space of 10 days. However they couldn't afford to pay the entire money as they were unable to collect the adequate amounts of money. They decide to take part in a kabaddi match to win the prize money.

== Cast ==
- Abhilash as Tharani
- Leema Babu
- S. Nandakumar
- Rishi
- C. N. Prabhakaran
- Thenali
- Yogesh
- Sivaraj
- Senthil
- Velmurugan
- Telephone Mani
- Ashok
- Azhagappan
- Desingu Raja
- Saranya
- Vijay Gautham
- E. R. Pugazh
- Vijith Saravanan
- Nivetha
- Sakthivel Murugan
- Kantha
- Prabhakaran
- Appasamy
- Srimathi
- Naveen Shankar
- Peter
- Thendral Sasikumar

== Production ==
The film was announced by debutant director P. Iyyappan who served as former associate of director A. Venkatesh. The film title was also inspired from the life of Dhoni.

== Soundtrack ==
Soundtrack was composed by Roshan Joseph.

- "Kannal Iva Kavitha Pesura" - Gunasekaran
- "Apulla Apulla" - Roshan Joseph C. J.
- "Ithu Jaikkapora" - Velmurugan
- "Thadaigalai Udaithidu" - Mukesh Mohamed
- "Iva Ooru Kallakuruchi" - V. V. Prasanna

== Reception ==
Times of India wrote " Despite its honourable intention of glorifying kabadi, Dhoni Kabadi Kuzhu is an amateurish exercise that struggles to keep us hooked, mainly due to the bland performances are bland, and the flat filmmaking". Indian Express wrote "For a film which talks at length about the pride of Tamil and kabaddi, Dhoni Kabadi Kuzhu ends up being a discredit to both due to its incredibly careless writing and making." News Today wrote "It is honourable that the makers have tried to give their best and build up a good image for our native sport, kabaddi. But, it is sad that though their attempts are praiseworthy, they have botched up a bit in the execution. The film is dragging in the first half and the humour, if any, fails to make us laugh on most occasion. Things get better in the second half though as the movie gets in on the kabaddi action. But what is funny is that the serious and tense moments that the director hopes to make us sit on the edge of the seat, do the exact opposite and make us laugh".
