= Vietnam Veedu Sundaram =

Indian playwright, screenwriter and film director

- Born: Sundaram c. 1943; Tiruchirappalli, Madras Presidency (now Tamil Nadu), British India
- Died: 6 August 2016; Chennai, Tamil Nadu, India
- Occupations: Playwright, screenwriter, film director, actor
- Years active: 1970-2016
- Spouse: Chella
- Children: Anu Parthasarathy

Vietnam Veedu Sundaram was an Indian playwright, screenwriter and film director. He wrote films such as Gauravam, Vietnam Veedu, Gnana Oli, Satyam, Grihapravesam, Justice Gopinath, Annan Oru Koyil, Naan Yen Pirandhen and Naalai Namadhe. He also directed a few films and is well known for his family themes. He written stories films in languages such as Telugu, Kannada and Hindi. He also worked as an actor in films and television.

== Early life ==
Sundaram was born in 1943 to a lawyer father in Tiruchirappalli, Tamil Nadu. His mother brought him to Madras in 1945 to see Mahatma Gandhi at Island Grounds. As he was not well-educated, he was made to work in a factory even at a very young age. In 1955-56 he joined Dunlop factory as a machine operator. In the meantime, he was also working as a service boy in United Amateur Artistes run by Y.G. Parthasarathy, his wife and Pattu. That kindled his interest in drama and cinema. He narrated real life incidents with imagination and make it an interesting story. This made him a good storyteller among his friends. Slowly he graduated himself in theatrics and play writing. Soon he became a good screenplay and dialogue writer.

== Film career ==
He was the mastermind behind creating the highly successful play "Vietnam Veedu," hence the prefix for his name. Vietnam Veedu Sundaram played the hat-trick in films too with the same titles, all acted by the Nadigar Thilagam Sivaji Ganesan, the Thespian of Indian cinema. He is known as the 'founder' of social mythology. The well known movies which he wrote include Vietnam Veedu, Gnana Oli, Naan En Piranden, Naalai Namadhe, Satyam, Gruhapravesam, Justice Gopinath, Anaan Oru Koyil, Oru Malarin Payanam, Navagraha Nayaki, Geethanjali, Aayiram Kannudayaal, Dharmam, Piranthen Valarthen, Nambinar Keduvathillai, Jallikattu, Raja Mariyadhai, Velundu Vinaiyillai, Soora Samhaaram. He also wrote story for Kannada film Anupama. He gained national fame for writing the story for 1978 Hindi film Devata starring Sanjev Kumar in the lead. He cast the ever green K. R. Vijaya in the role of goddess in "Namma Veetu Deivam", the first time social mythology in Tamil, which was remade into Malayalam, Telugu and Kannada. That set the social mythology trend in films and televisions. He has directed more than dozen films and is well known for his family themes with one of them Gauravam being a cult classic. His stories have been made into films in other languages also. He started acting in films since 1999.He turned actor on the small screen from 1998 and has to his credit quite a few television serials. He has worked as a writer for films with many popular stars including M. G. Ramachandran, Sivaji Ganesan, Rajinikanth, Kamal Haasan, K. R. Vijaya, Sathyaraj and Karthik.

== Death ==
Sundaram died on 6 August 2016 at the age of 73 due to age related ailments. He is survived by his wife Chella and daughter Anu Parthasarathy who is a costume designer.

== Awards and nominations ==
"Vietnam Veedu" Sundaram won the Tamil Nadu State Film Award for Best Dialogue Writer for his magnum opus, Vietnam Veedu in 1970. He also won the Arignar Anna Award in the Tamil Nadu State Film Honorary Award in 1991.

== Filmography ==
=== Writer ===
Films

- Vietnam Veedu (1970) - Scriptwriter
- Namma Veettu Deivam (1970) - Dialogue
- Veguli Penn (1971) - Dialogue
- Irulum Oliyum (1971) - Dialogue
- Gnana Oli (1972) - Scriptwriter
- Naan Yen Pirandhen (1972) - Dialogue
- Itho Enthan Deivam (1972) - Dialogue
- Vijaya (1973) - Scriptwriter
- Manidharil Manikkam (1973)
- Gauravam (1973) - Scriptwriter
- Kasthuri Vijayam (1975) - Scriptwriter
- Naalai Namadhe (1975) - Scriptwriter
- Panakkara Penn (1976)
- Satyam (1976)
- Gruhapravesam (1976)
- Paalootti Valartha Kili (1976)
- Thaaliya Salangaiya (1977)
- Naam Pirandha Mann (1977)
- Thanikudithanam (1977)
- Justice Gopinath (1978)
- Annan Oru Koyil (1978)
- Oru Veedu Oru Ulagam (1978)
- Devata (1978) (Hindi)
- Allauddinum Albhutha Vilakkum (1979)
- Kandhar Alangaram (1979)
- Valli Mayil (1980)
- Engamma Maharani (1981)
- Anupama (1981) (Kannada)
- Paritchaikku Neramaachu (1982)
- Vaa Kanna Vaa (1982)
- Thunai (1982)
- Nalamthaana (1982)
- Garuda Saukiyama (1982)
- Donga (1985) (Telugu)
- Anthasthu (1985)
- Oru Malarin Payanam (1985)
- Navagraha Nayagi (1985)
- Geethanjali (1985)
- Ammavum Neeye Appavum Neeye (1985)
- Aayiram Kannudayaal (1986)
- Dharmam (1986)
- Piranthaen Valarnthaen (1986)
- Nambinar Keduvathillai (1986)
- Brahmastram (1986) (Telugu)
- Anand (1987)
- Jallikattu (1987)
- Raja Mariyadhai (1987)
- Velundu Vinaiyillai (1987)
- Soora Samhaaram (1988)
- Bharatamlo Bala Chandrudu (1988) (Telugu)
- Prananiki Pranam (1990) (Telugu) - Story

Television

- Vikramadithyan
- En Peyar Ranganayaki
- Velan

=== Director ===
- Vijaya (1973)
- Gauravam (1973)
- Devi Sri Karumari Amman (1974)
- Payanam (1976)
- Kandhar Alangaram (1979)
- Gnana Paravai (1991)

=== As actor ===
Films

- Appu (2000)
- Anjaneya (2003)
- Kannamoochi Yenada (2007) - Arumugam Gounder's father
- Kolagalam (2013)
- Vandha Mala (2015)
- Namma Kadha (2017)

== Television ==
Year	Title	Role	Channel
2000 - 2001	Krishnadasi	Sama	Sun TV
2004 - 2007	My Dear Bootham	Alavudeen/Moosa's Grandfather	Sun TV
2000–2001	Rishimoolam	Host	Puthuyugam TV
2002 - 2005	Metti Oli	Kathiresan	Sun TV
2004 - 2006	Raja Rajeshwari		Sun TV
2004 - 2007	Avargal		Sun TV
2007 - 2012	Athipookal	Krishnamurthy	Sun TV
2008 - 2009	Kalasam		Sun TV
2010	Abirami	Villain	Kalaignar TV
2010 - 2012	Pondatti Thevai	Minor Sundarrajan	Sun TV
2012 - 2015	Bhairavi Aavigalukku Priyamanaval		Sun TV
2012 - 2014	Pillai Nila	Neelaveni's Uncle	Sun TV
2013 - 2016	Valli	Sundaram	Sun TV
2015 - 2016	Thangamana Purushan		Kalaignar TV
