= Gauravam (1973 film) =

- Theatrical release poster
- Directed by: Vietnam Veedu Sundaram
- Written by: Vietnam Veedu Sundaram
- Based on: Kannan Vanthaan by Vietnam Veedu Sundaram
- Produced by: S. Rangarajan
- Starring: Sivaji Ganesan; Ushanandini; Pandari Bai
- Cinematography: A. Vincent
- Edited by: R. Devarajan
- Music by: M. S. Viswanathan
- Production company: Vietnam Movies
- Release date: 25 October 1973
- Running time: 136 minutes
- Country: India
- Language: Tamil

Gauravam (transl. Prestige) is a 1973 Indian Tamil-language legal drama film written and directed by Vietnam Veedu Sundaram. The film stars Sivaji Ganesan in a dual role as a barrister and his nephew (an amateur lawyer) fighting the same case. It is an adaptation of Sundaram's play Kannan Vanthaan (transl. Kannan came). The film was released on 25 October 1973 and became a commercial success, with Ganesan winning the Filmfare Award for Best Actor – Tamil.

== Plot ==
Madras High Court barrister Rajinikanth is a tour de force criminal defence lawyer who has never lost a case. He is a self-made man with a rags to riches story, is well respected by other lawyers and is a terror to his opponents in the court. His only unfulfilled ambition is the prestigious position of judgeship and has all the qualifications of being a judge, with an exaggerated ego being his only character flaw. Kannan is Rajinikanth's nephew who is brought up like a son by the childless Rajinikanth and his wife Chellamma. Rajinikanth tutors Kannan in law and wants his ward to be as successful as he is. Kannan is an antithesis of Rajinikanth; he is a loving, loyal, god-fearing man, who occasionally appears in pro bono cases as a public defender.

One day, Rajinikanth is shocked to learn that an undeserving lawyer Rangabashyam has been made the high court judge, instead of him. Meanwhile, a man named Mohandas murders his wife and beseeches lawyers to appear on his behalf and save him. Rajinikanth feels that the bar council has insulted his prowess in jurisprudence and decides to seek his revenge by gaming the system and getting Mohandas acquitted, despite the latter's clear guilt. Mohandas is acquitted by the court, thanks to Rajinikanth's expertise in law. This deeply hurts Kannan, who does not say anything at that time out of respect for his uncle.

Later, Mohandas's fiancé dies in her bathtub by accident. Mohandas is arrested under suspicion that he has repeated his crime. Rajinikanth appears on Mohandas's behalf again. But this time around, Kannan protests and walks out of the house to become the prosecution lawyer facing Rajinikanth, convinced that the loyalty to his profession supersedes the loyalty to his adopted father. In the climactic court battle, Kannan defeats Rajinikanth due to his meticulous preparation as well as Mohandas neglecting to mention a critical surprise witness. Rajinikanth is particularly infuriated when Kannan taunts him asking if he would like an adjournment to prepare to cross examine that witness. Rajinikanth's ego does not allow him to seek adjournment, handing Kannan the victory. His first loss proves too much to handle and an anguished Rajinikanth succumbs to death, just before Kannan brings him the news of his appointment as a judge.

== Cast ==
- Sivaji Ganesan as Barrister Rajinikanth and Advocate Kannan
- Ushanandini as Radha
- Pandari Bai as Chellamma
- Major Sundarrajan as Mohandass
- V. K. Ramasamy as Kanagambaram
- Nagesh as Gopal Iyer
- Senthamarai as Inspector Karunakaran
- Rama Prabha as Kathambari
- Jayakumari as Kalpana
- Y. G. Mahendran as Kannan's driver
- Neelu as Neelakandan/Neelakundu
- K. Vijayan as Dr. Balakrishnan
- Poornam Viswanathan as the judge in the climax
- Veeraraghavan as a judge
- I. S. Ramachandran as Kalyanam
- Comedy Shanmugam as Pithambaram

== Production ==
Kannan Vandhaan was a stage play. Sundaram, who wrote the play, returned to direct the film adaptation, titled Gauravam. Production began in late November 1971. The title of the film, which translates to prestige, was taken from the play and film versions of Sundaram's Vietnam Veedu where there is a character named Prestige Padmanabhan. Sivaji Ganesan's style of smoking a pipe in the film was inspired by that of an industrialist T. S. Krishnan, and his hairstyle was inspired by T. S. Narayanaswami, an industrialist then associated with India Cements.

Gauravam was the first film where Ganesan and Y. G. Mahendran acted together. Mahendran recalled that Ganesan would play the role of Rajinikanth in the morning and his nephew Kannan during the afternoon; he would remain in character even when not filming, speaking like his characters. Ganesan's home, Annai Illam, features in the film. The scene where Rajinikanth warns Kannan not to participate in court proceeding was shot at Vijaya Studios.

== Soundtrack ==
The music was composed by M. S. Viswanathan, with lyrics by Kannadasan. The song "Palooti Valarthakili" was initially recorded with a different singer; Viswanathan found his voice did not match with Ganesan's acting, so he recorded the song again in T. M. Soundararajan's voice.

Track listing
No.	Title	Singer(s)	Length
1.	"Yamuna Nadhi"	S. P. Balasubrahmanyam, P. Susheela	4:22
2.	"Adhisaya Ulagam"	L. R. Eswari	4:05
3.	"Palooti Valarthakili"	T. M. Soundararajan	4:32
4.	"Mezhuguvarthi Erikindrathu"	T. M. Soundararajan	3:33
5.	"Neeyum Naanuma"	T. M. Soundararajan	4:33
Total length:			21:05

== Release and reception ==
Gauravam was released on 25 October 1973, Diwali day. Kanthan of Kalki positively reviewed the film, particularly for Ganesan's performance as Rajinikanth. The film became a commercial success, running for over 100 days in theatres. Ganesan won the Filmfare Award for Best Actor – Tamil.

== Legacy ==
Ganesan reprised the role of Rajinikanth in the Doordarshan television series Meendum Gauravam. Dialogues from this film were used for the teaser of the 2022 film Nanpakal Nerathu Mayakkam.

== Bibliography ==
- Ganesan, Sivaji; Narayana Swamy, T.S. (2007) [2002]. Autobiography of an Actor: Sivaji Ganesan, October 1928 – July 2001. Chennai: Sivaji Prabhu Charities Trust. OCLC 297212002.
