= Kuppathu Raja (2019 film) =

2019 Indian Tamil film directed by Baba Bhaskar

- Theatrical release poster
- Directed by: Baba Bhaskar
- Written by: Baba Bhaskar
- Screenplay by: Baba Bhaskar
- Produced by: M Saravanan siraj Saifudeen; T Saravanan
- Starring: G. V. Prakash Kumar; Parthiban; Palak Lalwani; Poonam Bajwa; Yogi Babu
- Cinematography: Mahesh Muthuswami
- Edited by: Praveen K. L.
- Music by: G. V. Prakash Kumar
- Production company: S FOCUSS
- Distributed by: S FOCUSS
- Release date: April 5, 2019
- Running time: 120 minutes
- Country: India
- Language: Tamil

Kuppathu Raja (transl. King of Slums) is a 2019 Indian Tamil-language action comedy-drama film written and directed by choreographer Baba Bhaskar. The film stars G. V. Prakash Kumar, Parthiban, Palak Lalwani and Poonam Bajwa, with Yogi Babu in supporting roles. The background score and soundtrack were composed by G. V. Prakash himself, while cinematography was dealt by Mahesh Muthuswami and editing was managed by Praveen. The film began pre-production in March 2017. Kuppathu Raja is produced by Saravanan, Siraj and Saravanan under the banner S FOCUSS production.

== Plot ==
The movie is about the relationships between a few slum dwellers and how some antisocial elements create unrest in their lives. The slum is dominated by a five-member gang headed by MG Rajendran (Parthiban), a do-gooder and hardcore fan of MGR. The people there look up to him, and he has the final say in everything. He is like a godfather to the slum people. Rocket (G. V. Prakash Kumar) is the son of Rajendran's aide Oor Niyayam (M. S. Bhaskar). He has a devil-may-care attitude and is in love with Kamala (Palak Lalwani), another girl from the slum. When the couple dreams of a life together, Mary (Poonam Bajwa), a new resident to the slum, changes their lives. Meanwhile, a series of untoward incidents disrupt the peaceful lives in the slum. Later it is revealed that Seth Ji as the mastermind behind the crimes. Rajendran and Rocket avenge all the deaths in their areas by killing all the goons and finally Seth & hanging him staging it like a suicide. Rocket gets stabbed by Seth's other goons. However three days later he miraculously survives and finally Raj blesses Rocket and his girlfriend telling them though Rocket's father died, Rocket can consider him as his father-figure. Later, Rocket becomes the party president with MG Rajendran’s support.

== Cast ==
- G. V. Prakash Kumar as Rocket
- Parthiban as M. G. Rajendran
- Palak Lalwani as Kamala
- Poonam Bajwa as Mary
- Mukesh Rishi as Kaali Anna
- Yogi Babu as Kai Saamman
- M. S. Bhaskar as Oor Niyayam, Rocket's father
- R. N. R. Manohar as Kai Saamman's father
- D. R. K. Kiran as Daas
- Namo Narayana as Aasaithambi
- Jangiri Madhumitha as Kamala's friend
- Singampuli as Mokkai
- Baboos as Mastan Bhai
- Rahul Thatha as Antony
- Vijayamuthu as Ghilli
- Karnaraja as Dhina
- Hemarnath as Bandari Seth
- Sathish Kanna
- Shanthi Mani
- Chandrasekar

== Production ==
Choreographer Baba Bhaskar announced his first film as a director in September 2016 and cast G. V. Prakash Kumar in the lead role. Cinematographer Mahesh Muthuswami, editor Praveen K. L. and art director Kiran were also revealed to form a part of the technical crew. The film was revealed to have two lead actresses. Poonam Bajwa is roped in to play a role of Anglo-Indian in the film. The film began production in late March 2017, with the title Kuppathu Raja named after Rajinikanth's 1979 film of same name announced and actor Parthiban joining the team.

== Release ==
The movie was released worldwide on 5 April 2019 and received mixed reviews from critics.

== Soundtrack ==
The soundtrack was composed by G. V. Prakash Kumar.

Kuppathu Raja

Soundtrack album by G. V. Prakash Kumar
- Released: 2019
- Genre: Soundtrack
- Length: 15:55
- Language: Tamil
- Label: Junglee Music
- Producer: G. V. Prakash Kumar

G. V. Prakash Kumar chronology
| Semma (2018) | Kuppathu Raja (2019) | Watchman (2019) |

All lyrics written by Logan.

| No. | Title | Singers | Length |
|---|---|---|---|
| 1. | "Enga Area Engaludhu" | Santhosh Hariharan | 3:23 |
| 2. | "Meen Kuzhambu" | Gana Guna | 2:46 |
| 3. | "Indha Sirruki Ippo" | Priya Himesh | 3:07 |
| 4. | "En Uyira Nee Irundha" | G. V. Prakash Kumar | 3:55 |
| 5. | "Vazhkaiyea Oru Olivilakku" | Gana Bala, Velmurugan | 2:44 |
| Total length: | | | 15:55 |
