= My Dear Bootham (TV series) =

India television series

- Genre: Supernatural
- Directed by: K. Shanmugham
- Starring: Naga Kannan; Abhilash; Master Bharath; Gowtham; Nivetha Thomas; Haritha
- Theme music composer: X. Paulraj
- Country of origin: India
- Original language: Tamil
- No. of episodes: 914

Original release
- Network: Sun TV
- Release: 3 May 2004 – 30 November 2007

My Dear Bootham (transl. My dear genie) is a 2003-2007 Indian Tamil-language supernatural television series directed by K. Shanmugham. The series starred Naga Kannan, Abhilash, Master Bharath, Gowtham, Nivetha Thomas and Haritha.

== Plot ==
Moosa and his family were a part of the Bhootham family. Moosa and his family come to rescue his friends when they are harmed by their enemies.

== Cast ==
- Abhilash as Moosa
- Master Bharath(1–411)&(455–914)/Unknown(412–455) as Balu
- Gowtham as Gowtham (1–914)
- Nivetha Thomas as Gowri
- Haritha as Sandhya
- Naga Kannan as Bootham
- Gandhimathi as Moosa's grandmother
- Sangeetha Balan as Moosa's mother
- Vietnam Veedu Sundaram/Unknown as Alavudeen/Moosa's grandfather
- Vaiyapuri as Kittu
- Priyadharshini
- S. Rajasekar as Police Inspector Gowri and Gowtham's father
- Srikala Paramasivam
- Raj Kapoor
- Rajkamal
- Latha Rao
- Sanjeev Venkat
- O. A. K. Sundar as Mugamboo
- Gowthami Vembunathan
- King Kong as Sathyam
- Thavakalai Chittibabu as Kullan
- T. P. Gajendran
- Manohar as Raghu

== Production ==
The series was one amongst many to feature CGI. While acting in the serial, Abhilash received several film offers but denied them in order to continue working on the show since it is what gave him his identity.

== Music ==
The music was composed by X. Paulraj.

Track listing
No.	Title	Lyrics	Singer(s)	Length
1.	"My Dear Bootham Ne"	Dr. Kiruthiya	Tippu, Vyshali, Nirmal Sidhu, Kiran, Sruthi, X. Paulraj and Dr. Kiruthiya	4:04
Total length:				4:04

== Reception ==
In a retrospective review in 2024, a writer from The Times of India wrote that "The juxtaposition of the ghostly realm with the nuances of human life lent the series a distinctive charm, making it a household favorite" and added that the "impeccable performances [of the cast], coupled with engaging storytelling, propelled the series to acclaim and ensured its enduring popularity" and concluded that it "left an indelible imprint on the landscape of Indian television, earning a devoted following that transcended generations. Its blend of supernatural elements, humor, and heartwarming moments resonated with viewers, cementing its status as a timeless classic".

== Awards ==
Government of Tamil Nadu

- Best Child Artiste - Master Bharath
