= Shwetha Bandekar =

Indian film and Tamil television actress

- Other name: Shwetha or Swapna
- Occupation: Actress
- Spouse: Mal Maruga (m. 2022)

Shwetha Bandekar is an Indian actress who has appeared in Tamil and Telugu films and television serials. She has appeared in films including Aalwar, Valluvan Vasuki, as well as in the Sun TV series Chandralekha.

== Personal life ==
Bandekar completed a Bachelor of Technology degree at the PMR Engineering College near Chennai and a Master of Business Administration degree. She married Mal Maruga in December 2022.

== Career ==
Bandekar first acted in the Tamil film Aalwar as Ajith Kumar's sister. From 2007 to 2012, She was female lead in over five films. She began acting in the teleserial Magal as Swapna which ran for more than 1000 episodes in Sun TV.

== Filmography ==
=== Films ===
Year	Film	Role	Language
2007	Aalwar	Kalpana	Tamil
2008	Valluvan Vasuki	Vasuki	Tamil
2008	Chedugudu		Telugu
2011	Poova Thalaiya		Tamil
2012	Payanangal Thodarum		Tamil
2012	Meeravudan Krishna	Meera	Tamil
2012	Veerachozhan		Tamil
2012	Idhayam Thiraiarangam	Mahalakshmi	Tamil
2014	Naan Than Bala	Vaishali	Tamil
2015	Bhooloham	TV VJ	Tamil

== Television ==
Serials

Year	Serial	Role	Channel	Notes
2009–2011	Magal	Swapana	Sun TV	
2014–2022	Chandralekha	Chandra and Nila	Sun TV	Dual Roles
2016	Lakshmi Vandhachu	Latchu	Zee Tamizh	
2019	Nila	Chandra	Sun TV	Special Appearance
2020	Roja	Chandra	Sun TV	Special Appearance
2020	Magarasi	Chandra	Sun TV	Special Appearance
2021	Anbe Vaa	Chandra	Sun TV	Special Appearance
2023	Chinthamani	Eshwari	Dual Roles	

Shows

Year	Serial	Role	Channel
2017–2018	Star Wars	Contestant	Sun TV
2019	Super Sisters	Herself	Sun TV
2019	Vanakkam Tamizha	Herself (Guest)	Sun TV
2020	Vanakkam Tamizha	Herself (Guest)	Sun TV
2021	Vanakkam Tamizha	Herself (Guest)	Sun TV
2021	Poova Thalaiya	Contestant	Sun TV
2021	Poova Thalaiya	Contestant	Sun TV
2021	Poova Thalaiya	Contestant	Sun TV
2022	Maathi Yosi	Contestant	Sun TV

Advertisements

- Cinthol Soap - Tamil
- Udaya Krishna Pure Ghee - Tamil
