= Maru Malarchi =

- Theatrical release poster
- Directed by: Bharathi
- Written by: Bharathi
- Produced by: Henry
- Starring: Mammootty; Devayani; Ranjith; Mansoor Ali Khan
- Cinematography: Thangar Bachan
- Edited by: V. T. Vijayan; B. Lenin
- Music by: S. A. Rajkumar
- Production company: Pangaj Productions
- Release date: 14 January 1998
- Country: India
- Language: Tamil

Maru Malarchi (transl. Revival), also spelled as Marumalarchi, is a 1998 Indian Tamil-language drama film directed by Bharathi and produced by Henry. The film stars Mammootty, Devayani, Ranjith and Mansoor Ali Khan, with Manorama, Kalabhavan Mani, R. Sundarrajan, Major Sundarrajan, Vivek and Pandu playing supporting roles. It was released on 14 January 1998 and become a huge success. The film was remade in Telugu as Suryudu, in Kannada as Soorappa and in Hindi as Phool Aur Aag.

== Plot ==
Rasu Padayachi (Mammootty) is the chief of his village Gunavasal. He is a kindhearted person who is highly respected by the villagers, and he is so respected that the people even erect his statue in the village. Rasu Padayachi has dedicated his life for the welfare of the villagers. When the Muslim peoples of the surrounding villages wanted to buy one of his lands to build a mosque there, Rasu Padayachi refuses their money and gives them his land for free. In the village Sundarapuram, Manimaran (Ranjith) is a respected village chief who lives with his parents (M. N. Rajam and K. K. Soundar). Manimaran and his cousin Mannaru (Mansoor Ali Khan) are known for being short-tempered people.

Rasu Padayachi is invited to open a rice shop in a remote village. After the ceremony, he and his driver Velu (Kalabhavan Mani) are on their way home to their village Gunavasal. Rasu Padayachi then stops the car in order to buy some fruits in Sundarapuram's market. In his village, nobody would take money for his shopping, which makes him uncomfortable, so he prefers to do shopping in surrounding villages. At the market, Rasu Padayachi pulls the village belle Jayanthi's (Devayani) hand to save her from an approaching snake. Unfortunately, only Velu and Rasu Padayachi seem to have noticed the snake. Jayanthi makes a big fuss of the event by assuming Rasu Padayachi to be a rogue. Manimaran and Mannaru beat Rasu Padayachi up in public without taking notice of his defense. The land broker and family friend (Shanmugasundaram) sees the injured Rasu Padayachi in that village. Rasu Padayachi says it was just a misunderstanding. The angry broker goes to that market and makes the villagers understand that they have done a huge mistake. He warns that this incident may lead to serious consequences if Gunavasal's villagers come to know the truth. Manimaran and Mannaru realize their mistake and regret the incident. In the meantime, Rasu Padayachi warns Velu not to talk about the humiliating incident to anyone and pretends the injuries were due to an accident.

Once back home, Rasu Padayachi lies to the villagers that he had a car accident. Velu, who was frustrated and angry of the incident, finally discloses the matter to the villagers that same night. Meanwhile, as per his father's advice, Manimaran goes on horseback to Gunavasal on the very night to seek an apology. When he discloses the incident to Rasu Padayachi's mother, she beats him, but Rasu Padayachi stops her. Manimaran falls at Rasu Padayachi's feet and begs for an apology. The kind Rasu Padayachi forgives him, and Manimaran returns to his village. Gunavasal's villagers get angry after knowing about the incident, and they all go to Sundarapuram with aruvals without warning Rasu Padayachi. They create a mess in Sundarapuram and set fire to their houses. The riot causes the death of many villagers, including Manimaran's parents and Jayanthi's mother.

The next morning, Manimaran finally comes to his village, and he notes the damage and deaths. The district collector and police arrive at Rasu Padayachi's village to tell him to be safe and that they will now handle the issue between the two villages. Rasu Padayachi becomes furious with Velu and the village people when he learns about the previous night's riot. Manimaran feels betrayed by Rasu Padayachi and sees the destruction of Sundarapuram as Rasu Padayachi's cunning plan. An angry Manimaran then destroys Rasu Padayachi's statue in front of Gunavasal's villagers. The trio of Jayanthi, Manimaran, and Mannaru vow to take revenge on Rasu Padayachi in a similarly cunning fashion. Later, Rasu Padayachi wants to help the victims financially, but they refuse his money. Rasu Padayachi offers to marry Jayanthi as she has nobody left in her life to live with, but she sees this as an opportunity to destroy Rasu Padayachi. Both Manimaran and Mannaru are also convinced so.

After the marriage, Jayanthi discovers Rasu Padayachi's true nature: a golden-hearted man, and she becomes a good wife. On the other hand, Manimaran and Mannaru still seek revenge on Rasu Padayachi. What transpires next forms the rest of the story.

== Cast ==
- Mammootty as Rasu Padayachi
- Devayani as Jayanthi
- Ranjith as Manimaran
- Mansoor Ali Khan as Mannaru
- Kalabhavan Mani as Velu
- Manorama as Rasu Padayachi's mother
- Vivek as Nagaraj
- R. Sundarrajan as Rasu Padayachi's maternal uncle, Commonly called as Mesthiri by everyone
- Major Sundararajan
- Jyothi Lakshmi
- Pandu as Azhagu
- M. N. Rajam as Manimaran's mother
- K. K. Soundar as Manimaran's father
- S. N. Lakshmi
- Bala Singh as Kalingarayan
- Vasu Vikram as Madhavarayan
- Vaiyapuri as Palli
- Shanmugasundaram as Land Broker
- Shakeela
- Pasi Narayanan
- Bayilvan Ranganathan as Kasinathan
- A. K. Veerasamy as Mariappan
- Ramya Sri
- Anwar Ali Khan
- Tirupur Ramasamy
- John Babu in a guest appearance
- Bharathi as Snake charmer
- Appukutty as Tea seller (uncredited role)
- Soori as Audience member (uncredited role)

== Production ==
The producers of the film initially approached Vijayakanth to portray the lead role, but he declined due to scheduling conflicts with Ulavuthurai; Mammootty was later selected. A village set costing close to ₹25 lakh (equivalent to ₹1.2 crore or US$130,000 in 2026) was built near Tiruvannamalai for the film. Moreover, a huge mosque set was also built for the climax of the film. The film marked the debut of Kalabhavan Mani in Tamil cinema.

== Soundtrack ==
The music was composed by S. A. Rajkumar.

Track listing
No.	Title	Lyrics	Singer(s)	Length
1.	"Nandri Solla Unakku"	Vaali	Hariharan, Amrutaa	03:41
2.	"Pankajame Rangamaniye"	Vaali	K. S. Chithra	04:39
3.	"Oorazhutha"	Vaali	P. Unnikrishnan	02:17
4.	"Ayyirandu Madhangal"	Vaali	Unnikrishnan	02:12
5.	"Mannukkulla"	V.C. Vijayshankar	S. A. Rajkumar	09:33
6.	"Nandri Solla Unakku"	Vaali	Unnikrishnan, K. S. Chithra	03:46
7.	"Rettaikili"	Vaali	Swarnalatha, T. K. Kala, Mano	04:22
8.	"Kambanukku Kai Koduthu"	Vaali	S. A. Rajkumar	06:04
Total length:				36:34

== Reception ==
The Times of India wrote, "The strength of Marumalarchi lies in its story which improves upon the cliche of the virtuous village patriarch. The story-telling is straight forward and wavers only occasionally." D. S. Ramanujam of The Hindu wrote, "Mammotty plays the leader with methodical efficiency and calm bearing. Director Bharathi, who has written the story, dialogue and screenplay, has worked up interesting segments to give stature to the hero's role as demanded in the storyline, all with native aroma. The camera of Thankar Bachchan has a field day". The film was the best performer at the box office from six Tamil film released on 14 January 1998. Screen wrote, "Mammootty’s sterling performance as Rasapadiyachi, the zamindar, and his excellent rendering of the native dialect aided by a gripping screenplay, have made the film a superhit with the masses."

== Accolades ==
Maru Malarchi won three Tamil Nadu State Film Awards: Second Best Film, Best Villain (Ranjith) and Best Dialogue Writer (Bharathi).

== Possible sequel ==
The director announced a sequel to the project in 2020.
