= Marumalarchi Bharathi =

Indian film director

Bharathi
- Born: Kunavasal, Kattumannarkoil
- Occupations: Director; actor
- Years active: 1998–present

K. Bharathi, better known as Marumalarchi Bharathi, is an Indian film director and actor who has directed village based stories.

== Career ==
Bharathi made his directorial debut with Chinna Pulla (1994) under the pseudonym Baskaran. He later directed Maru Malarchi starring Mammootty in the lead. The film received critical acclaim, won Tamil Nadu State Film Award for Best Film and also earned Bharathi an award of Best dialogue writer. Bharathi's next directorial Kallazhagar starring Vijayakanth was also a success movie. An elephant called Appu was brought in from Thrissur in Kerala for the film, where the elephant formed one of a stable maintained by the famed Paaramekaavu temple, which forms the venue of the yearly Thrissur Pooram festival. The film was rejected by Indian censors, because of its potential to spark religious conflicts - with particularly a scene in which some Muslim extremists masquerade themselves as religious Hindus and join in the celebration of a major festival in a temple - being highlighted as a concern. The team subsequently had to adapt the concept partially. Bharathi's third film Maanasthan starring Sarathkumar was a delayed project and received mixed reviews. After a four-year gap, Bharathi directed Valluvan Vasuki starring newcomers, the story is about the Konar dynasty and much of the shooting was done in villages bordering the Kollidam River in Thanjavur district. The film received mixed reviews.

In 2020, he announced Marumalarchi 2, a sequel to his earlier film.

== Filmography ==
=== As a film director and writer ===
Year	Film	Notes			
Year	Film	Notes	1994	Chinna Pulla	credited as K. Baskaran
1998	Maru Malarchi	Tamil Nadu State Film Award for Best Film Tamil Nadu State Film Award for Best Dialogue Writer			
1999	Kallazhagar				
2004	Maanasthan				
2008	Valluvan Vasuki				

=== As an actor ===
Year	Film	Role	Notes
1998	Maru Malarchi	Snake charmer	
1999	Kallazhagar	Narikurava tribe man	
2004	Maanasthan	Vellachamy	
2008	Valluvan Vasuki	Kalyanam	
2020	Draupathi	Ramasamy	
2022	Sinam	Auto driver	
