= Kaathadi =

- Theatrical release poster
- Directed by: Kalyaan
- Written by: Kalyaan
- Produced by: Srinivas Sambandam; V. N. Ranjith Kumar; K. Sasikumar
- Starring: Avishek Karthik; Dhansika; Baby Sathanya; Daniel Annie Pope
- Cinematography: Jemin Jom Ayyaneth
- Edited by: Vijay Velukutty
- Music by: R. Pavan; Deepan B.
- Production company: Galaxy Pictures
- Release date: 23 February 2018
- Country: India
- Language: Tamil

Kaathadi (transl. Kite) is a 2018 Indian Tamil-language action drama film written and directed by Kalyaan. The film stars Avishek Karthik, Dhansika, and Baby Sathanya, with Daniel Annie Pope, Rajendran, Kaali Venkat, John Vijay, Kota Srinivasa Rao, and Sampath Raj in supporting roles. Featuring music composed by newcomers Pavan and Deepan, the film began production in 2014 and was complete by 2015, but was released on 23 February 2018.

== Cast ==
- Avishek Karthik as Sakthi
- Dhansika as the Unnamed Heroine
- Baby Sathanya as Anitha
- Daniel Annie Pope as Thuppakki
- Sampath Raj as Kathiresan
- Rajendran
- Kaali Venkat as Muruga
- John Vijay as Karthavarayan
- Kota Srinivasa Rao as Seth
- Manobala
- V. S. Raghavan
- Jangiri Madhumitha
- Lollu Sabha Manohar as House Owner
- Snehan
- Mukzeeth
- Singampuli
- Vinodhini Vaidyanathan as Anitha's mother
- Bava Lakshmanan

== Production ==
Kalyaan, a former participant on the reality show Naalaiya Iyakkunar, began making his directorial debut film, Kaathadi, during October 2014. Dhansika was signed on to play a police officer, while Avishek Karthik, previously seen in Gautham Vasudev Menon's Vaaranam Aayiram (2008) and Nadunisi Naaygal (2011), was selected as the lead actor. Dhanshika suggested the makers chose her for the role because of her height, and partook in the action scenes without a stunt double.

The film began production in late 2014 and was revealed to be in post-production by October 2015. The film was shot extensively in Chennai, Kerala and Yelagiri. During filming Vagamon in Kerala, a group of drunkards came to the spot and briefly caused trouble before Dhanshika helped halt the issue. A long delay before the release of the film meant that two other films of Kalyaan, Katha Solla Porom (2016) and Gulaebaghavali (2018), were released before Kaathadi. Dhansika also gained further popularity between the end of production and the release of the film, following her appearance in Kabali (2016). In between, she also worked on Uru (2017), a film by Vicky Anand, who worked as an assistant to Kalyaan during the making of Kaathadi.

== Soundtrack ==
The film's music was composed by debutants R. Pavan and Deepan. The soundtrack was released on 3 June 2016 through Musik247.

Track listing
No.	Title	Lyrics	Music	Singer(s)	Length
1.	"Adada Daa"	Mohan Rajan	R. Pavan	Madhu Balakrishnan	4:49
2.	"Kaathadi" (Theme)	—	Deepan	—	2:06
3.	"Thaaye Thaaye"	Ganesh Raja	Deepan	Anu	2:24
4.	"Orphans Cry"	—	Deepan	Balaji, Kamalakar	1:55
5.	"Vaama Vaama"	Mohan Rajan	R. Pavan	Mohanrajan	3:02
6.	"Pain and Misery"	—	R. Pavan	—	1:43
7.	"Survival"	—	R. Pavan	—	2:05
Total length:					18:04

== Reception ==
Gopinath Rajendran from Cinema Express wrote, "With not many redeeming factors, Kaathadi is an amateur take on a run-of-the-mill story with twists that don't really raise eyebrows". The film was also reviewed by Cinema Vikatan and Dina Thanthi.
