= Jackpot (2019 film) =

Indian film directed by Kalyaan

- Theatrical release poster
- Directed by: Kalyaan
- Written by: Kalyaan
- Produced by: Suriya
- Starring: Jyothika; Revathi; Yogi Babu; Anandaraj
- Cinematography: R. S. Anandakumar
- Edited by: Vijay Velukutty
- Music by: Vishal Chandrasekhar
- Production company: 2D Entertainment
- Distributed by: Sakthi Film Factory
- Release date: 2 August 2019
- Running time: 133 minutes (Note: runtime in movie censor certificate is 141.2 minutes, but released movie runtime including credits is 133.1 minutes)
- Country: India
- Language: Tamil

Jackpot is a 2019 Indian Tamil-language fantasy comedy film written and directed by Kalyaan. The film stars Jyothika and Revathi, in lead roles, while Samuthirakani, Mansoor Ali Khan, Yogi Babu and Anandaraj (in a dual role) playing supporting roles. Revathi plays the character of Masha for the third time after Arangetra Velai and Gulaebaghavali. The film is produced by actor Suriya under his production banner 2D Entertainment. The music for the film is scored by Vishal Chandrasekhar. The principal photography of the film commenced on 12 February 2019. The film was released on 2 August 2019. The film received mixed to positive reviews from critics.The film was a box office hit.

== Plot ==
The film opens in 1918 and follows a milkman who accidentally stumbles upon an inexhaustible vessel (Akshaya Patra) while digging for a well. He fills it with cows milk, however, when he continues digging the well, he is surprised that the vessel produced a lot of milk from a small amount. He uses the vessel to change his fortune and become rich, but not for long as it eventually gets stolen by two people. Many years later, the vessel is found by an old lady who sells idlis by a riverbank and she uses it to feed more people. She passes on the secret about the vessel and its power to Akshaya (Jyothika) and Masha (Revathi), who says she had buried the vessel due to fear that someone might steal it from her. She says that she has buried it in Maanasthan's (Anandaraj) rice mill near a bull shed. Akshaya and Maasha get the help of Mottai (Rajendran) and Rahul Vijay (Yogi Babu). How they get their hands on the vessel while dealing with Maanasthan and Bhai (Mansoor Ali Khan) forms the crux of the story.

== Cast ==
- Jyothika as Akshaya
- Revathi as Mashavaani
- Yogi Babu as Rahul Vijay
- Anandaraj as Maanasthan and Inspector Maanasthi
- Rajendran as Motta
- Mansoor Ali Khan as Bhai
- Sachu as Manimegalai
- Manobala as Rice Mill Rayyappan
- Mime Gopi as Rahul's father
- Devadarshini as Rahul's mother
- Jagan as Rahul's friend
- Imman Annachi as Police Constable
- Anthony Daasan as Pannaiyar
- Suzane George as Jail Warden
- Subhashini Kannan as Mrs. Maanasthan
- Tiger Garden Thangadurai as Maanasthan's assistant
- Vinu Krithik as Real Rahul
- Redin Kingsley as Tumbler, Maanasthan's assistant
- Veerasamar as a worker at Maanasthan's house
- Ashwin Raja as Maanasthan's assistant
- Mahanadhi Shankar as Jail Warden
- Sembaruthi Sanjay as Egg Seller
- Supergood Subramani as Restaurant owner
- Mippu as a member of Bhai's gang
- Samuthirakani as Film Director (Special Appearance)

== Soundtrack ==
Jackpot

Soundtrack album by Vishal Chandrasekhar
- Released: 28 July 2019
- Recorded: 2019
- Genre: Feature film soundtrack
- Length: 10:20
- Language: Tamil
- Label: Sony Music Entertainment India Pvt. Ltd.
- Producer: Vishal Chandrasekhar

Vishal Chandrasekhar chronology
Kee (2019)	Jackpot (2019)	Chanakya (2019)

The soundtrack of the film was composed by Vishal Chandrasekhar on lyrics of Vivek, Arunraja Kamaraj, Lady Kash and Ku. Karthik.

Track listing
No.	Title	Lyrics	Singer(s)	Length
1.	"Shero Shero" (Chorus: Nincy Vincent, Ala B Bala, Feji, Madhuvanthi)	Vivek	Sinduri Vishal, Brindha Sivakumar	3:04
2.	"Therikkudha" (Chorus:Nincy Vincent, Ala B Bala, Teji, Madhu Vanthi)	Arunraja Kamaraj, Lady Kash	Arunraja Kamaraj, Lady Kash	2:25
3.	"Asapodum"		Anthony Daasan	0:52
4.	"Na Jilla Kedi" (Chorus:Nincy Vincent, Ala B Bala, Teji, Madhu Vanthi)	Ku. Karthik	Maalavika Sundar, Roshini	3:12
Total length:				10:20

== Reception ==
According to Behindwoods, it stated that "Jyothika and Revathy charmingly playing to the gallery and Anandraj's comedies make Jackpot a one time watch" giving it a 2.2/5. While The Times of India giving three stars out of five, gave a positive review "Though the story has nothing new to offer except the plot surrounding the vessel, the film manages to entertain, thanks to some of the comic scenes which are devoid of double-entendre. The background score, however, reminds us of music from a few other movies. The two songs do not add much value to the story but look vibrant on the screen. An unapologetically made fun film, this may appeal to those who love watching movies in this genre." Baradwaj Rangan of Film Companion South wrote "...the writing is all over the place and the director seems to have other concerns. He wants to project his heroine as a “mass” star. She gets to do slo-mo walks. She gets to beat up many men. She gets to mouth lines delivered on screen by other “mass” heroes. All this simply kills the mood".
