= Karma (2015 Tamil film) =

2015 Indian film by R. Arvind

- Poster
- Directed by: R. Arvind
- Written by: R. Arvind
- Produced by: R. Arvind
- Starring: R. Arvind
- Cinematography: V. B. Sivanandam
- Edited by: Vinoth Balan
- Music by: L. V. Ganesan
- Production company: Creative Criminal
- Release dates: December 2015 (All Lights India International Film Festival); 16 September 2016 (online)
- Running time: 72 minutes
- Country: India
- Language: Tamil

Karma is a 2015 Indian Tamil-language murder mystery film directed, produced and written by R. Arvind in his debut. The features two characters namely a police officer and a crime writer throughout the entirety of the film.

== Cast ==
- R. Arvind as Thamizhselvan and Ranganathan

== Production ==
The film is an experimental film and unlike other Tamil-language films does not have a heroine, multiple songs, or comedy tracks. In 2012, Arvind held a casting call for the lead actor before ultimately he himself decided to play both of the lead roles.

== Soundtrack ==
The soundtrack was composed by L. V. Ganesan and compromises of one song "Karma (Title Track)", which was written and sung by lyricist Vairamuthu. For the song, Vairamuthu wrote ten new tirukkuṛaḷs. The song also marks his debut as a singer.

== Release ==
The film received a nomination at the Madrid International Film Festival in 2015 and is the first Tamil film to do so. The film was released online on 16 September 2016 on paid subscription streaming platforms such as Amazon Video, iTunes, and Google Play by Bollywood director Anurag Kashyap. This film was promoted as the first Tamil film to be released online. Although the film Ayynoorum Ayynthum (2016) was released online, it was released online for free.

== Awards and nominations ==
- Madrid International Film Festival – Best Director of a Foreign Language film – R. Aravind – Nominated
- Hollywood Sky Film Festival – Official Selection
