= 80s Buildup =

- Theatrical release poster
- Directed by: Kalyaan
- Written by: Kalyaan
- Produced by: K. E. Gnanavel Raja
- Starring: Santhanam; Radhika Preethi; R. Sundarrajan; K. S. Ravikumar
- Cinematography: Jacob Rathinaraj
- Edited by: M. S. Bharathi
- Music by: Ghibran
- Production company: Studio Green
- Release date: 24 November 2023
- Country: India
- Language: Tamil

80s Buildup, or more simply as Buildup, is a 2023 Indian Tamil-language period supernatural comedy film written and directed by Kalyaan. Produced by K. E. Gnanavel Raja under the production banner Studio Green, the film stars Santhanam and Radhika Preethi in the lead roles, and R. Sundarrajan and K. S. Ravikumar in supporting roles. The film was released theatrically on 24 November 2023.

== Plot ==
Kathir and Manja Kili are siblings from a wealthy Zamindar family, who revel in each other's misfortunes. A diamond smuggler, en route to delivering diamonds to his customer, Bhai, stops near the Zamindar palace to steal an antique sword containing a treasure map. He dispatches his henchmen, disguised as museum representatives to retrieve the sword. Kathir's grandfather, Naathamuni, an ardent fan of Rajinikanth, demands diamonds in exchange for the sword. Naathamuni mistakes them for sugar cubes and swallows them. Further, he is electrocuted by a repaired table fan and dies instantly.

Kathir, a die-hard fan of Kamal Haasan, is celebrating at Devi Theatre when he receives the news from Kaali, a horse-cart owner. As Naathamuni's soul departs, the God of Death, Yama, accompanied by his assistant Chitragupta, arrives to escort him to the afterlife. Before departing, Naathamuni is granted the opportunity to fulfill five wishes. He reveals that he will disclose his wishes at two-hour intervals, and Chitragupta acknowledges this as his first wish, granting it accordingly. Naathamuni's second wish is to reunite with his youthful love, Manja Kili, after whom he named his granddaughter. As relatives begin to arrive for the funeral, Kathir and Manja Kili engage in a wager. Kathir must make their distant cousin, Devi, fall in love with him before their grandfather's final rites. If Kathir loses, he and his friends will be forced to wear half-sarees for the next three months.

Kathir asks Kaali to retrieve Kathir's uncle, Banglore Manohar from the railway station and detain him as long as possible, thereby pushing the final rites to the next day. Much to Manja Kili's annoyance, Kathir impresses Devi by reciting a poem, offering her a dress to change into, providing her with food, and claiming to have cooked it himself. Vichithragupta, another assistant of Lord Yama arrives to inform the group that, according to fate, another death is imminent. Meanwhile, in pursuing the diamonds the smugglers bring Gopal, a mortuary worker, in women's attire to impersonate Naathamuni's past love, Manja Kili. However, Kathir's drunkard father mistakenly believes Gopal to be an actual woman and becomes infatuated with him. Gopal awaits an opportunity to retrieve the diamonds from Naathamuni's corpse. English Thirudan, a thief specializing in utensils, jewelry, and even children's undergarments, infiltrates Kathir's house. Kathir with English Thirudan's help steals Devi's diary and returns it to her, who appreciates his honesty.

Idaivelai "Velai", arrives at the funeral home. Manjakili, Kathir's sister, provokes Velai, who had been seeking revenge against Kathir for escaping a fake boxing match. During the fight, Kathir initially suffers beatings, but Naathamuni's soul gets his third wish granted, and possessing Kathir's body confronts Velai making Kathir emerge victorious. Following this, Naathamuni's soul visits the theater to admire Silk Smitha. Once the soul departs, Kathir realizes his unexpected triumph over Velai. Bangalore Manohar, arrives at the railway station, accompanied by his new wife, Ammulu. Kaali, without disclosing the news of Naathamuni's passing and enchanted by Ammulu's beauty, Kaali intentionally delays their arrival at the funeral house.

The diamond smuggling gang switches off the power, but Thangam, Kathir's friend, foils their plan. Gopal turns on the fan but gets electrocuted and thrown away. The smuggling gang rescues Gopal and escapes. As night falls, when Kathir and Devi briefly step out, the diamond smugglers steal away Naathamuni's corpse. Naathamuni's soul is granted another wish by Lord Yama, allowing him to retrieve his own body and return it to the house. Also, Bhai, the customer who was supposed to receive the diamonds, arrives to retrieve them, but Kathir engages in a fierce battle with Bhai and his men but ultimately escapes. Manjakili manipulates her father into proceeding with Naathamuni's final rites, despite the customary practice of waiting until dawn. As part of his wish, Naathamuni sees his youthful love, Manjakili, who is now the wife of the crematorium worker. As she beats Naathamuni's corpse, which has begun to expand due to the heat, and his soul is overcome with distress, Naathamuni makes his final wish to depart to eternity. Lord Yama grants his wish, and Naathamuni's soul, along with Lord Yama and his assistants, departs.

The next morning, Kathir is disheartened, feeling defeated in the bet with his sister. To extend the time for their bet, Kathir tricks his grandmother, Arukaani, into switching on the repaired table fan. Meanwhile, Bangalore Manohar is still en route to the funeral house but has almost reached Bangalore. The diamond thieves plan to retrieve the diamonds from Naathamuni's ashes from the house. Through English Thirudan, the diamond smugglers discover that the sword they had been seeking is fake.

== Cast ==
- Santhanam as Kathir
- Radhika Preethi as Devi
- R. Sundarrajan as Naathamuni Thevan, Kathir's grandfather
- K. S. Ravikumar as Lord Yama Dharma Raja
- Sangeetha as Manja Kili, Kathir's sister
- Anandaraj as Gopal, a mortuary worker
- Aadukalam Naren as Kathir and Manja Kili's Father
- Munishkanth as Chitragupta
- Redin Kingsley as Vichitragupta
- Mansoor Ali Khan as a diamond thief
- Manobala as Parameshwaran "Paramu", diamond thief's aide
- Mottai Rajendran as a diamond thief's aide
- Mayilswamy as Kaali, horse-cart owner
- Thangadurai as Thangam, Kathir's friend
- Swaminathan as Kathir's uncle
- Kalairani as Arukkaani, Kathir's grandmother
- Subhashini Kannan as Devi's mother
- Ashwin Raja as Kathir's friend
- Mippu Samy as Kathir's friend
- Arjai as Idaivelai "Velai"
- Cool Suresh as English Thirudan, a thief
- Vinod Sagar as Baasha, diamond thief's driver
- Supergood Subramani as Constable Mani
- Lollu Sabha Seshu as Bangalore Manohar, Kathir's uncle
- Soundar as Bujanlaal Seth
- Nikhila Sankar as Manja Kili's friend
- Mullaiyarasi as Manja Kili's friend
- Roja Sholapur as Ammulu, Manohar's wife
- Caroline Hiltrud as Velai's wife

== Production ==
The film was written by Kalyaan with Santhanam in mind during 2022, with production on the film beginning by the end of the year. Produced by Studio Green, the film brought together a number of comedic actors including Manobala and Mayilswamy, who died before the release of the film. The film was first announced to the media in October 2023, only a month before the film's release. Radhika Preethi, who had previously worked on films such as Raja Loves Radhe (2018) and Embiran (2019), appeared in the leading female role. Kalyan revealed that the film would be set in the 1980s, and would feature Santhanam as huge fan of Kamal Haasan, while his grandfather would be a Rajinikanth fan.

== Release and reception ==
The film had a theatrical release on 24 November 2023 across Tamil Nadu. A critic from Times of India noted that it was "a comedy with potential that misfires" and that "there is a laugh riot hiding within the plot of 80s Buildup, but unfortunately, director Kalyaan fails to find it". A critic from The Hindu wrote "if you are looking for an activity to test your mental endurance to the maximum, well, this Santhanam film hits the mark", in a negative review. Navein Darshan of Cinema Express wrote the film was "a lazy, offensive talkathon masquerading as comedy" and that "every scene in the film is a reminder that there has been very little to no work done on the writing front to entertain or respect its audience".
