= Dhonima =

2024 Indian-Tamil language film

- Theatrical release poster
- Directed by: Jagadeesan Subu
- Written by: Jagadeesan Subu
- Produced by: Sai Devanand S; Sasikala S; Sai Venkateswaran S
- Starring: Kaali Venkat; Roshni Prakash; Vivek Prasanna
- Cinematography: Packiaraj; Sajith Kumar
- Edited by: Tamil Arasan
- Music by: EJ Johnson
- Production companies: SSBV Learn and Teach Production Private Limited
- Release date: 20 September 2024
- Country: India
- Language: Tamil

Dhonima is a 2024 Indian Tamil-language drama film written and directed by Jagadeesan Subu. The film stars Kaali Venkat, Roshni Prakash, and Vishav Raj in the lead roles. Vivek Prasanna, Kannan Ponniah, Rajesh Sharma, P. L. Thenappan, Kalki Rajan and others appear in supporting roles. The film has music composed by EJ Johnson, cinematography handled by Packiaraj and Sajith Kumar and editing by Tamil Arasan.

Dhonima released theatrically on 20 September 2024.

== Plot ==
The story revolves around 'Dhonima', a female Golden Retriever puppy rescued by Dhanam from a dustbin and she takes it to her home. Her husband, Kotti is an alcoholic who does not care about his son Dravid who has a hearing issue, while Dhanam's only goal is to save enough money for her son's surgery.

== Cast ==
- Kaali Venkat as Kotti
- Roshni Prakash as Dhanam
- Vishav Raj as Dravid
- Vivek Prasanna
- Kannan Ponnaiah
- Rajesh Sharma
- P. L. Thenappan
- Kalki Raja
- Aadukalam Stella Raj
- Rajamani
- Maya Munieshwaran
- Vichithiran
- Sasi
- Mogli K Mohan
- Karthik Munees

== Production ==
Jagadeesan Subu, who earlier directed Sigai (2017) and Bakrid (2019) announced through a title reveal video, the title of his next film Dhonima starring Kaali Venkat who was last seen in Kurangu Pedal (2024), along with Roshni Prakash, and Vishav Raj in the lead roles.

Principal photography took place around Chennai, mainly in areas like Anna Nagar and Kolathur and wrapped up after 36 days in early June.

== Music ==
The music and background score is composed by EJ Johnson. All the songs were penned by S Gnanakaravel. The first single, "Moradaa Un Thaali", released on 26 June 2024, which had vocals performed by Shankar Mahadevan, and Vandana Srinivasan. The second single,"Kaalam Oda", released on 10 September 2024, which had vocals performed by G. V. Prakash Kumar.

Track listing
| No. | Title | Writer(s) | Singer(s) | Length |
|---|---|---|---|---|
| 1. | "Moradaa Un Thali" | S Gnanakaravel | Shankar Mahadevan, Vandana Srinivasan | 5:04 |
| 2. | "Kaalam Oda" | S Gnanakaravel | G. V. Prakash Kumar | 3:07 |

== Release ==
=== Theatrical ===
Dhonima was released theatrically on 20 September 2024.

== Reception ==
Narayani M of Cinema Express rated two out of five and stated that "Dhonima has its heart in the right place and holds great potential to become a heart-winning drama." Roopa Radhakrishnan of The Times of India rated the film two-and-a-half out of five stars and opined that "even though Dhonima gets many moments right, it falls short of becoming a solid drama."
