= Repeat Shoe =

2022 Tamil language drama film

- Release poster
- Directed by: Kalyaan
- Produced by: T. Madhuraj
- Starring: Yogi Babu; Priya Kalyaan; Dileepan
- Music by: Sam C. S.
- Production companies: ATM Productions; Studios Karthik & Niyaz
- Release date: 14 October 2022
- Running time: 112 mins
- Country: India
- Language: Tamil

Repeat Shoe is a 2022 Indian Tamil-language drama film directed by Kalyaan and starring Yogi Babu, Priya Kalyaan and Dileepan. The plot revolves around a scientist who attempts to save a girl from child trafficking through his invention of a shoe that can time travel.

The film was theatrically released on 14 October 2022 to mixed reviews.

== Plot ==
Dileepan, a scientist, creates a pair of technical shoes with the ability to time travel, that will either go back in time for 10 days or 10 minutes depending on which shoe is hit on the ground. He attempts to test the shoe by trying to speed and escape, however gets caught. Whilst running away, he throws the shoes into a bush so that the police chasing after him do not get it, and he encounters Priya, a maternal orphan and uses her as a threat to the police officers to leave him.

Maari, an aspiring rowdy waiting for an assignment, wishes to show that he is apt to become a rowdy to his friends and tries to shoot the police officers chasing Dileepan from an above building. He instead shoots Dileepan, and Priya runs away.

The next day, Priya, who works at her drunkard father's cobbler stall before school, encounters Maari as her customer. He asks her to repair his sentimental shoes in two days in exchange for a makeover of the stall, which Priya agrees to. However Priya loses the shoe and attempts to calm Maari down by playing with him. She also finds Dileepan's shoe and gives it to him, stating it will give him good luck. Maari develops a soft spot for her.

Priya's father decides to sell her to a child trafficking group in exchange for ₹100,000 (US$1,200), where girls there are regularly transported to different places to avoid police and are used as prostitutes. Priya encourages the girls to escape, and they plot a plan.

Dileepan comes out of the hospital and tries to find his shoe, where he learns that Priya took it. Whilst trying to find her, he learns that her father sold her. He then tries to go to the place, where he understands that the girls are currently attempting to escape. Maari also learns that Priya has been sold, and tries to find her too. Dileepan fights with the people there and frees the girls, but also sees that Priya had died.

Maari also manages to come, and Dileepan sees that Maari is wearing his shoes. He begs Maari to give them back, which Maari reluctantly does so. Dileepan then uses the shoes to travel back in time to the point he was threatening the police using Priya, where he dodges Maari's bullet and escapes, letting Priya go and escaping the police. He then stops Priya's drunkard father as he takes her to sell her whilst they are travelling to the place, and takes Priya with him. Finally, he intercepts the child trafficking group whilst they were transporting the girls and saves them.

== Cast ==
- Yogi Babu as Maari; an aspiring, orphaned rowdy
- Priya Kalyaan as Priya; a maternal orphan who almost becomes the subject of child trafficking
- Dileepan as Dileepan; a scientist who creates a time-travelling shoe
- Redin Kingsley as Maari's friend
- KPY Bala as Maari's friend
- Anthony Daasan
- George Vijay
- Semmalar Annam as the child trafficker's henchmen

== Production ==
This was the first film produced by Studios Karthik, and they favoured Kalyaan as the movie's director due to his experience with filming with children. During production, the film was titled as Shoe, before changing name prior to release.

== Reception ==
The film was released on 14 October 2022 across Tamil Nadu. A critic from Dinamalar gave the film a mixed review, noting that it was "average". A reviewer from Maalai Malar gave the film a negative review, adding that "more effort was needed". A reviewer from Dina Thanthi also criticised the film, stating that Sam C.S.'s music created high expectations, but ultimately failed to deliver this.
