= Arangetra Velai =

1990 film directed by Fazil

- Theatrical release poster
- Directed by: Fazil
- Written by: Gokula Krishnan (dialogues)
- Screenplay by: Fazil
- Story by: Siddique–Lal
- Based on: Ramji Rao Speaking by Siddique–Lal
- Produced by: Aroma Mani
- Starring: Prabhu; Revathi
- Cinematography: Anandakuttan
- Edited by: T. R. Sekar
- Music by: Ilaiyaraaja
- Production company: Sunitha Productions
- Release date: 23 February 1990
- Country: India
- Language: Tamil

Arangetra Velai (transl. The Time of Arangetram) is a 1990 Indian Tamil-language screwball comedy film starring Prabhu and Revathi. The film was directed by Fazil and produced by Aroma Mani. It is a remake of the 1989 Malayalam film Ramji Rao Speaking. The film was released on 23 February 1990.

== Plot ==
The story revolves around three unemployed people (the third is a middle-aged unsuccessful theatre owner). The story opens with the arrival of Sivaraman in Chennai to dispute the denial of his company job, which he was supposed to receive several years ago. Several candidates have passed him by, with the last one being Geetha, who pretends to be an influential figure in the town. She threatens Sivaraman to allow her to continue working despite his efforts to overthrow her. The company manager, who knows her family situation (poor and pathetic) helps her to keep the job. Sivaraman is determined to stay back in the town until he succeeds in getting his job back from Geetha.

During his stay, Sivaraman finds a temporary lodging in Sakthi Nadaga Sabha, owned by Nambi Annan, with another tenant Masha, both of whom are unemployed and have insignificant earnings. Initially, Masha does not like the new tenant and tries to expel him from the house, but all her efforts are in vain, despite her trickery and cunning. Masha has been lying to her mother that she works as an air hostess and that she is building them a new house in Chennai. Sivaraman finds out about this and labels Masha a fraud. Sivaraman visits Geetha and finds out that her mother is mentally ill, brother is going blind who needs a surgery and her sister's husband has left her. When he learns about her family situation, he sympathises and decides to sacrifice his claim on the job. That night, Sivaraman gets drunk and reveals Masha's fraud to Nambi. Masha confesses, but justifies that projecting herself as rich and employed was the only way to comfort her mother. The truth softens the hearts of both Sivaraman and Nambi and the trio decide to become friends and have fun in spite of their unending problems.

Sivaraman wakes up at night when he hears the phone ring. A gang leader called Pakki Ram and Charan Singh have kidnapped the daughter of a rich businessman Sakthinathan and are demanding a ransom of Rs. 100,000. The panicked trio realise they have no idea who Sakthinathan is. Sivaraman tries to locate Sakthinathan's number from the telephone directory, only to realise that the phone numbers of the theatre and Sakthinathan have been mistakenly transposed. Sivaraman does some quick thinking and comes up with a plan. He suggests that they act as the broker between Pakki Ram and Sakthinathan, demand a ransom of Rs. 4,00,000 from Sakthinathan, return his daughter to him, and earn a profit of Rs. 3,00,000. Fed up with their poverty, the other two agree and the plan is set into motion, but the job isn't easy to carry out while hiding from the police and keeping Pakki Ram and Sakthinathan away from each other. Finally, after a struggle, the three rescue the girl from the gang leader and hand her over to Sakthinathan. They however are forced to confess the whole game when they encounter the police. Sakthinathan tries to shoot Sivaraman, but he escapes and promises Geetha that he is ready with money for her brother's eye operation and tells her to reach Sakthi Nadaga Sabha by morning. Nambi and Sivaraman reach Sabha earlier and find out Masha is missing, so they both call police and tell they three are involved and with much sadness, he says he loves Masha, after few minutes, Masha arrives there and rejoices for money. Nambi asks why she is late, Masha says she settled the amount, but later Masha learns they said to police feels what happened with fear through heart surrounds her and Masha tells she love Sivaraman, police arrive at Saba, however, Sakthinathan forgives them for having safely rescued his daughter, and instead gives them the money as a prize.

== Cast ==
- Prabhu as Sivaraman
- Revathi as Masha
- V. K. Ramasamy as Nambi Rajan alias Nambi Anna
- Janagaraj as Naidu
- Rasi as Geetha
- Vennira Aadai Moorthy as Company Manager
- Jai Ganesh as Sakthinathan
- Delhi Ganesh as Police Officer
- Vijayaraghavan as Pakki Ram
- Mamukkoya
- Sukumari as Masha's mother
- Anju as Sakthinathan's daughter

== Production ==
Arangetra Velai is a remake of Malayalam film Ramji Rao Speaking. Revathi was finalised after five actresses who were previously chosen opted out of the film.

== Soundtrack ==
The soundtrack was composed by Ilaiyaraaja. The song "Agaya Vennilave" is primarily set to the Carnatic raga named Durbarikaanada, but leans slightly towards the Saramati-Natabhairavi scales and mixes Kanada in the charanams.

Track listing
No.	Title	Lyrics	Singer(s)	Length
1.	"Aagaya Vennilavae"	Vaali	K. J. Yesudas, Uma Ramanan
2.	"Gundu Onnu"	Piraisoodan	Mano
3.	"Maamanukkum"	Vaali	K. S. Chithra, Mano
4.	"Thai Ariyatha"	Vaali	Mano, S. P. Sailaja

== Reception ==
P. S. S. of Kalki praised the humour but criticised the twists and climax.

== In other media ==
Due to the popularity of Revathi's character Masha, director Fazil planned a spinoff focusing on the character; this plan was abandoned after Revathi played characters sharing the same name and traits in Gulaebaghavali (2018) and Jackpot (2019).
