= Raja Loves Radhe =

Indian romantic drama film

- Theatrical release poster
- Directed by: M. Rajashekhar
- Written by: Vijaya Baramasagara (dialogues)
- Screenplay by: M. Rajashekhar
- Story by: M. Rajashekhar
- Produced by: H.L.N Raj
- Starring: Vijay Raghavendra; Radhika Preethi; Rakesh Adiga; Shubha Poonja
- Cinematography: Chidanand
- Music by: Veer Samarth
- Production company: H.L.N Raj Entertainer
- Release date: 18 May 2018
- Country: India
- Language: Kannada

Raja Loves Radhe is a 2018 Indian Kannada-language romantic drama film directed by M. Rajashekhar and starring Vijay Raghavendra, Radhika Preethi, Rakesh Adiga and Shubha Poonja.

== Plot ==
The film is about the love between a poor man (Raja) and a rich woman (Radha).

== Cast ==
- Vijay Raghavendra as Raja
- Radhika Preethi as Radha
- Rakesh Adiga as Rocky
- Shubha Poonja as Rukku
- P. Ravishankar
- Bhavya as Seethamma
- Mithra
- Tabla Nani as Nani
- Shobaraj
- Kuri Prathap as Chikka
- Sathyajith as Satyanna
- Petrol Prasanna
- Danny Kuttappa
- Kuri Ranga
- Kuri Sunil
- Pavan
- Mohan Juneja as Coupling Cottage, Madikeri receptionist
- Moogu Suresh as Moogu
- Niranjan
- Manoj
- HLN Raj
- Amruta Mandvikar in a special appearance in the song "Kanasalli Bandare"

== Production ==
"The sad thing is we can’t give fresh films all the time as we have exploited almost every topic available. And themes such as love, friendship or sibling relationships have been mined dry. Even suspense or horror has been overdone. The only thing we can do is package it in a new way. That, I think will be our responsibility"

— Vijay Raghavendra on the film's story, 2017

The film began production in early 2017. The film's director Rajashekhar previously directed the unreleased film Ee Saathiya. Radhika Preethi was previously credited as Ritiksha.

The film's title is based on Krishna's wife Radhe, but in this film Krishna is replaced with Raja. Vijay Raghavendra worked on this film alongside Kismath (2018) and Dharmasya (2018) in 2017. P. Ravishankar played a role that was different from his usual negative roles. The film was shot in Bengaluru and Mysore. The film has the tagline of Eradu Manasugalu Tillana (transl. The dance of two hearts). For an item song featuring Mumbai-based Amruta Mandvikar and choreographed by Kalai, 150,000 bottles were used.

== Soundtrack ==
Raja Loves Radhe

Soundtrack album by Veer Samarth
- Released: 16 May 2018
- Genre: Feature film soundtrack
- Length: 18:43
- Language: Kannada
- Label: Mass Music Adda

Veer Samarth chronology
Mass Leader (2017)	Raja Loves Radhe (2018)	Double Engine (2018)
External audio
- Raja Loves Radhe – Jukebox on YouTube

The soundtrack was composed by Veer Samarth.

Track listing
No.	Title	Lyrics	Singer(s)	Length
1.	"Sobagu Sobagu"	K. Kalyan	Tippu, Anuradha Bhat	4:21
2.	"One Day Morning"	Kaviraj	Vijay Prakash	3:33
3.	"Nooru Galli"	Vijay Bharamasagar	Shashank Sheshagiri, Sangeetha Ravindranath	3:52
4.	"Kanasalli Bandare"	V. Nagendra Prasad	Indu Nagaraj	3:41
5.	"Hottu Hettu"	M. Rajashekar	Hemanth Kumar H. S., Shruthi Prashanth	3:15
Total length:				18:43

== Reception ==
A critic from Chitraloka.com rated the film 3/5 and wrote, "Director Raj Shekar manages to give a convincing story about what real love suffers from. It is not just a fantasy being in love but real trouble. The director has given attention to every detail. It is like seeing the different aspects of love and relationship come alive on screen. The story has been given a good screenplay which keeps the narrative tight and keeps the audience glued to their seats". A critic from Chitratara.com rated the film 3.5/5 and wrote, "Raja Loves Radhe is a perfect family film and like eating an MTR [Mavalli Tiffin Rooms] lunch. This is wholesome family film with lot of new additions that keeps the audience grow up in thoughts". The film was a box office success.
