= T. M. Karthik =

Indian actor

- Born: T. M. Karthik Srinivasan; Chennai
- Occupation: Actor
- Years active: 2004–present

T. M. Karthik is an Indian actor acted in stage plays and feature films. He made his acting debut in films with Kanavu Meippada Vendum (2004).

== Career ==
Since 1994, Karthik has acted in over 60 productions and been on stage over 500 times to perform. Before becoming an actor, Karthik worked in the corporate world. TM Karthik is a part of the Evam group founded by Karthik Kumar. some of his films include Madrasapattinam, Deiva Thirumagal, Guru, Life of Pi and he got his breakthrough as Ileana's price conscious fiancé in Nanban.

== Filmography ==
Year	Film	Role	Notes
2004	Kanavu Meippada Vendum	Raju	
2007	Guru	Doctor	Hindi film; uncredited
2009	Sarvam	Naren	
2009	Thiru Thiru Thuru Thuru	Mute hospital worker	
2010	Kola Kolaya Mundhirika	Dilli	
2010	Madrasapattinam	Painter	uncredited
2011	Deiva Thirumagal	Krishna's friend	
2012	Nanban	Rakesh (Pricetag)	
2012	Life of Pi	Pi Patel's science teacher	English film
2013	Raja Rani	Booshan	
2013	Endrendrum Punnagai	Sunny	
2015	Ivanuku Thannila Gandam	Kasinathan	
2015	Indru Netru Naalai	Giridhara Parthasarathy	
2015	10 Endrathukulla	Doctor	
2015	Vellaiya Irukiravan Poi Solla Maatan	Sharma	
2016	Sawaari	Psycho	
2016	Ayynoorum Ayynthum	The Radical	
2016	Dhilluku Dhuddu	Kajal's brother-in-law	
2018	Gulaebaghavali		
2018	Diya	Police officer	
2018	Bhaskar Oru Rascal	Parthasarathy	
2018	Chekka Chivantha Vaanam	Ranjith	
2019	Viswasam	Doctor	
2019	Dev	Stand-up comedian	
2019	Dhilluku Dhuddu 2	Dr. Karthik	
2019	Gurkha	QTV Owner	
2019	Aadai	Senz	
2019	Zombie	MSD	
2019	Bigil	J. K. Sharma's assistant	
2020	Indha Nilai Maarum	General manager	
2021	Kamali from Nadukkaveri	Professor	
2021	Raajavamsam	Deepak	
2021	Velan	Madhivanan	
2022	Enna Solla Pogirai	Bank manager	
2022	Yugi	Barber shop customer	
2022	Adrishyam	Barber shop customer	Malayalam film
2022	Naai Sekar Returns	Babloo	
2022	DSP	Constable Srikanth	
2023	Ghosty	Police officer	
2023	Chandramukhi 2	Manager	
2024	Vasco Da Gama	Doctor	
2024	Bloody Beggar	Sunil	
2025	Gangers	Charles	
2025	Red Flower		
2026	Vengeance		
2026	Kaalidas 2	Doctor Prasanna	
2026	Immortal		

Television

- Batman Returns... To Chennai | The Middle Ages (2015) as Lucius Fox / Otteri Nari
- Vella Raja (2018) as Kamesh
- Rocket Boys (2022) as C. V. Raman
