= Ravimama =

- VCD cover
- Directed by: S. Narayan
- Written by: S. Narayan (Dialogues)
- Screenplay by: S. Narayan
- Story by: P. Vasu
- Based on: En Thangachi Padichava (Tamil)
- Produced by: Satyamurthy Kotam Raju
- Starring: V. Ravichandran; Nagma; Hema Panchamukhi
- Cinematography: G. S. V. Seetharam
- Edited by: P. R. Soundar Rajan
- Music by: Chaitanya
- Production company: Sri Rajarajeshwari Creations
- Release date: 19 March 1999
- Running time: 141 minutes
- Country: India
- Language: Kannada

Ravi Mama (transl. Uncle Ravi) is a 1999 Indian Kannada-language romance drama film directed by S. Narayan and produced by S. K. Raju. The film stars V. Ravichandran and Nagma. The film is a remake of the Tamil film En Thangachi Padichava.

The film was released on 19 March 1999 across Karnataka cinema halls and was well received.

== Cast ==
- V. Ravichandran as Ravi
- Hema Panchamukhi
- Nagma
- Lokesh
- Doddanna
- Vijay Kashi
- Thiagarajan
- M. N. Lakshmi Devi

== Production ==
The climax was picturised at Kanakapura.

== Soundtrack ==
All the songs were composed by Chaitanya and written by S. Narayan.

S. No.	Song title	Singer(s)	Lyrics
1	"Aa Kiranagalige"	L. N. Shastri, K. S. Chithra	S. Narayan
2	"Muddu Muddu"	L. N. Shastri, Sujatha Dutt	S. Narayan
3	"Priya Priya"	Rajesh Krishnan, K. S. Chithra	S. Narayan
4	"Aa Aaa Kaliyabeku"	S. P. Balasubrahmanyam, Suma Shastry	S. Narayan
5	"Nannase Mallige"	S. P. Balasubrahmanyam	S. Narayan
6	"Aleyo Ale"	S. P. Balasubrahmanyam, K. S. Chithra	S. Narayan

== Critical reception ==
S Shiva Kumar from The Times of India wrote "The performances are good, especially by Hema and Doddanna. Thyagarajan is menacing. Ravichandran and Nagma don't have much emoting to do. It would help if the length is pruned. Ultimately, there is more bevu in Ravimama than bella".

Srikanth Srinivasa from Deccan Herald wrote "S Narayan has failed to get his team to work according to his directions. Seetharam as the cameraman is good in parts. Chaitanya, alias Shastry, shows promise as a budding music director. Otherwise, a complete waste of money and effort!"
