= Conjuring Kannappan =

- Theatrical release poster
- Directed by: Selvin Raj Xavier
- Written by: Selvin Raj Xavier
- Produced by: Kalapathi S. Aghoram; Kalapathi S. Ganesh; Kalapathi S. Suresh
- Starring: Sathish; Regena Cassandrra
- Cinematography: S. Yuva
- Edited by: Pradeep E. Ragav
- Music by: Yuvan Shankar Raja
- Production company: AGS Entertainment
- Release date: 8 December 2023
- Running time: 140 minutes
- Country: India
- Language: Tamil

Conjuring Kannappan (also marketed as Conjuring Kannappan: Dreams Come True) is a 2023 Indian Tamil-language comedy horror film that was written and directed by Selvin Raj Xavier in his directorial debut, and produced by AGS Entertainment. The film stars Sathish and Regena Cassandrra alongside Nassar, Anandaraj, Saranya Ponvannan, VTV Ganesh, and Redin Kingsley. It revolves around a group of people who end up trapped in a haunted dream, and seek to escape.

The film was announced in September 2023 following the completion of principal photography. Yuvan Shankar Raja composed the film's music, S. Yuva handled cinematography, and Pradeep E. Ragav edited the film. Conjuring Kannappan was released theatrically on 8 December 2023, and became a success.

== Plot ==
Kannappan wants a job for himself but is unable to find work. An avid gamer, he wants to turn his hobby into a career. Kannappan starts talking to a young boy who plays games with him; he advises the boy to make a few in-game purchases and the boy ends up spending ₹10 lakh (US$12,000). The boy's uncle, a goon named Devil Armstrong, threatens Kannappan to pay for the boy's purchases in two weeks time.

One day, there is an issue with the water supply, and Kannappan, who wants to take a bath, goes to the well, which has not been used for months. As he draws water from the well, Kannappan finds a dreamcatcher with a voodoo doll attached to it. He idly plucks a feather from the dreamcatcher. That night, he dreams he is in a palace and ghosts are trying to kill him. Kannappan wakes up feeling anxious, thinking it was just a bad dream. But he is stuck in his dream; whenever he sleeps, Kannappan has the same dream. Not knowing what to do, Kannappan calls an expert named Exorcist Ezhumalai and asked him for help.

Ezhumalai starts his research and tells Kannappan not to let the dream catcher come into contact with anybody else. But Kannappan’s family members, Devil Armstrong and his therapist Dr. Johnny pluck feathers from it and get trapped in the same dream, hoping Ezhumalai’s research can find a solution to end this nightmare.

Ezhumalai found out about the infamous cases of Robert Langdon and Magdalene Ellis, both of whom lived in the 1930s in the palace Kannappan sees in his dream. Robert was a wretched man who abused a lot of women during his stay there. He forcibly married Magdalene and kept abusing her. Magdalene loved a soldier named William but while Robert was there, he would not let them meet. Magdalene lost her patience and asked William to do something about it, so he contacted a white witch and asked her to help. The witch created the dream catcher and told them although she could not unite them in the real world, she could create a dream world where Magdalene and William could stay without hindrance. Magdalene and William agreed to it and were transported there. Whatever happened in the dream world had an effect on reality and both worlds were not exclusive to each other. Robert found out about the dream world and unwittingly plucked a feather from the dream catcher; he entered the dream world and killed William and Magdalene, and then himself. Now, their souls are trapped in the dream world; their only means of escape is to use a monkey paw and chant the spell the white witch had told William. Unknown to Magdalene, the white witch trapped Robert in the dream world using a voodoo doll. To escape the dream world, Kannappan and the others must go to the dream palace and kill Robert.

Ezhumalai and paranormal investigator Dark Deves realise that the white house which belonged to Dark's grandmother, and Kannappan’s house were built on the site where the palace stood in the 1930s. Ezhumalai wants to go with Kannappan and the others but suffers a heart attack, so they must wait because they need Ezhumalai's guidance. Kannappan does not have a monkey claw so Ezhumalai finds another way to end the dream. He says if they take the dream catcher with them into the dream world and pluck a feather, it might have a similar to the paw, but it is a huge risk and Ezhumalai is not sure, telling everyone if the feather trick does not work, they will be trapped there forever. Kannappan knows he must take the risk and the others agree.

The feather trick does not work but Kannappan burns the voodoo doll to get the better of Robert's spirit. With Deves' help, Kannappan kills the spirit of Robert, and ensures the spirits of William and Magdalene get salvation, and takes everybody back to the real world, ending their nightmare. Inspired by his experiences, Kannappan develops a video game which becomes a success.

== Cast ==
- Sathish as Kannappan aka KP
- Regena Cassandrra as Dark Daves
- Nassar as Exorcist Ezhumalai
- Anandaraj as Devil Armstrong
- Saranya Ponvannan as Lakshmi, Anjanenjan's wife and Kannappan's mother
- VTV Ganesh as Anjanenjan, Lakshmi's husband and Kannappan's father
- Redin Kingsley as Dr. Johnny
- Elli AvrRam as Dr. Magdalene Ellis
- Jason Shah as Soldier J. William Blake
- Benedict Garrett as Commander Robert Langdon
- Hella Stichlmair as Malkin Davies, Dark Daves' grandmother
- Namo Narayana as Sekar
- Soundarya Priyan as Interviewer
- Apollo Ravi as Interviewer
- Adithya Kathir as Devil Armstrong's sidekick

== Production ==
On 18 September 2023, AGS Entertainment announced their next project Conjuring Kannappan, which was written and directed by debutant Selvin Raj Xavier, and would star Sathish in the lead role alongside Regina Cassandra, Nassar, Anandaraj, Saranya Ponvannan, VTV Ganesh and Redin Kingsley. The project is Sathish's second collaboration with AGS Entertainment after Naai Sekar (2022). On 28 October, composer Yuvan Shankar Raja was named as part of the project, along with technicians including cinematographer S. Yuva, editor Pradeep E. Ragav, art director Mohana Mahendran, costume designer N. Meenakshi and stunt choreographer Miracle Michael. The film was mostly shot on a set in Chennai.

== Music ==
The music and background score of Conjuring Kannappan were composed by Yuvan Shankar Raja. T-Series acquired the film's audio rights.

== Release ==
Conjuring Kannappan was released theatrically on 8 December 2023. Netflix bought the streaming rights. The film began streaming there from 5 January 2024.

== Critical reception ==
Times Now gave Conjuring Kannappan a rating of three out of five, and wrote: "Selvin Raj Xavier's directorial vision, coupled with the stellar cast and technical excellence, promises a cinematic experience that transcends genres". Janani K of India Today said the film has "sporadic laughs ... But, mostly ... lacks new ideas". M Suganth of The Times of India wrote that the director used the "exciting premise to build a horror comedy using a bunch of comic performers who elevate even the clichéd moments with their well-timed quips. In fact, they are the major strengths of the film".
