= Bloody Beggar =

- Theatrical release poster
- Directed by: Sivabalan Muthukumar
- Written by: Sivabalan Muthukumar
- Produced by: Nelson
- Starring: Kavin; Redin Kingsley; Prudhvi Raj
- Cinematography: Sujith Sarang
- Edited by: R. Nirmal
- Music by: Jen Martin
- Production company: Filament Pictures
- Distributed by: Five Star K. Senthil; Ayngaran International
- Release date: 31 October 2024
- Running time: 139 minutes
- Country: India
- Language: Tamil
- Box office: est. <₹10 crore

Bloody Beggar is a 2024 Indian Tamil-language black comedy drama film directed by debutant Sivabalan Muthukumar and produced by Nelson Dilipkumar under Filament Pictures, in their maiden production venture. The film stars Kavin in the lead role, alongside Radha Ravi, Redin Kingsley, Padam Venu Kumar, Prudhvi Raj, Saleema, Priyadharshini Rajkumar, Sunil Sukhada and T. M. Karthik.

Prior to the film's official announcement, it was referred to as Kavin 06, denoting the actor's sixth venture as the lead actor. The film was officially announced in May 2024, in addition to the official title. Principal photography commenced in December 2023 and occurred predominantly in Chennai, and wrapped by March 2024. The film has music composed by Jen Martin, cinematography handled by Sujith Sarang and editing by R. Nirmal.

Bloody Beggar released worldwide on 31 October 2024 in theatres, coinciding with Diwali. The film mixed reviews from critics who praised its visuals, narration, soundtrack and cast performances (especially Kavin) but the pacing, writing, and black comedy received polarizing response. It became a box office failure, making Nelson to compensate the loss to the distributors. Some noted similarities between the film Ready or Not. The film saw a resurgence after its streaming release and received positive reviews from audiences there.

== Plot ==
The movie starts with four cruel siblings bullying their uncle's son. On pretext of celebrating his birthday, they end up killing him in a brutal beat down. Camera rolls to Kavin, who plays as a lazy but witty beggar, who spends his days fooling people by employing various acts such as blind, disabled, limb-less etc., and successfully extorting money from them via their sympathy. He lives in a dilapidated house with a boy named jack. One day, when he is invited to eat at the death of a rich actor, he gets stuck inside the dead actor's mansion while exploring. The rich man leaves behind his property to his children. But on his will, his children with their respective families get to know that the majority of his property has been given to his illegitimate son, born out of wedlock. Now, a crooked lawyer who is in cahoots with one of the siblings and also desires to usurp this property makes Kavin pose as said illegitimate son. How Kavin escapes from these folks and how he unveils his dark past make up the remainder of the story.

== Cast ==
- Kavin as Kavin the Begger
- Radha Ravi in a dual role as
  - Actor Chandrabose "Boss"
  - Chandru, Chandraboss’s twin brother
- Redin Kingsley as Hariharan / Ghost, Chandrabose’s illegitimate son
- Padam Venu Kumar as Rudhran, Chandrabose's elder son
- Prudhvi Raj as Kuberan, Chandrabose's younger son
- Miss Saleema as Mandakini, Chandrabose's eldest daughter
- Priyadarshini Rajkumar as Radha, Chandrabose's youngest daughter
- Sunil Sukhada as Vithagan, lawyer
- T. M. Karthik as Sunil, Radha's husband
- Arshad as Vasan, Sunil and Radha's son
- Akshaya Hariharan as Vasudha, Rudhran's daughter
- Anarkali Nazar as Thara, Mandakini's daughter
- Merin Philip as Kani, the beggar's wife
- Tanuja Madhurapantula as Babyma, Kuberan’s second wife
- Rohit Denis as Vikram, Rudhran's son
- Vidyuth Ravi as Varun, Mandakini's son
- U. Sree Sarvavan
- Mohammed Bilal
- Dhivya Vikram as Kuberan's wife
- Master Ajaykrishna as Siddharth, Chandru’s son

== Production ==
=== Development ===
In late September 2023, it was reported that Nelson Dilipkumar would debut as a film producer for a project directed by his associate director Sivabalan Muthukumar and starred by Kavin in the lead role. The official announcement on 3 May 2024 confirmed the project, announced cinematographer Sujith Sarang, editor R. Nirmal, composer Jen Martin, art director Manimozhian Ramadurai being a part of the technical crew. Kavin who had earlier worked as an associate to Nelson in films like Doctor (2021) and Beast (2022) would be portraying the role of a beggar alongside an ensemble cast consisting of Maruthi Prakashraj, Sunil Sukhada, T. M. Karthik, Padam Venu Kumar, Arshad, Priyadarshini Rajkumar, Miss Saleema, Akshaya Hariharan, Anarkali Nazar, Dhivya Vikram, Tanuja Madhurapantula, Rohit Denis, Vidyuth Ravi and Mohammed Bilal was released through a promotional video.

=== Filming ===
Principal photography began with the first schedule on 10 December 2023 in Mysore, followed by a schedule in Chennai. Filming wrapped by March 2024, having lasted 45 working days.

== Music ==
Bloody Beggar

Soundtrack album by Jen Martin
- Genre: Feature film soundtrack
- Language: Tamil
- Label: Think Music India
- Producer: Jen Martin

Jen Martin chronology
Dada (2023)	Bloody Beggar (2024)	Then Chennai (2024)

Singles from Bloody Beggar
- 1. "Naan Yaar (Promo Song)" Released: 13 September 2024; 2. "Beggar Waala (Promo Song)" Released: 25 October 2024; 3. "Ponmayame" Released: 27 October 2024

The music and background score were composed by Jen Martin, in his second collaboration with Kavin after Dada (2023). The audio rights were acquired by Think Music. A promotional music video "Naan Yaar" was released on 13 September 2024. Another promotional song "Beggar Waala" was released on 25 October 2024. The single titled "Ponmayame" was released on 27 October 2024.

Track listing
No.	Title	Writer(s)	Singer(s)	Length
1.	"Beggar Waala"	Vishnu Edavan, Ashique AR	Anthony Daasan, Muthulakshmi, Jen Martin	3:18
2.	"Ponmayame"	Vivek, Vishnu Edavan	Sathya Narayanan	3:45
3.	"Asagama Masagatsa"	Venu Selvan	RK Hari Prasad Ramani	2:47
4.	"Forgiveness"	Vishnu Edavan	Sathya Narayanan	3:45
5.	"Naan Yaar"	Vishnu Edavan	RK Hari Prasad Ramani	3:12
6.	"Death Punch"	Venu Selvan	Venu Selvan	1:53
7.	"Hoodibaba"	Vishnu Edavan, Venu Selvan	Dacalty, Sathya Narayanan	2:14
8.	"Naan Yaar" (2)	Venu Selvan	Nakash Aziz	3:12
Total length:				24:06

== Release ==
=== Theatrical ===
Bloody Beggar released on 31 October 2024 in theatres, coinciding with Diwali, clashing with Amaran and Brother.

=== Home media ===
The satellite rights were acquired by Sun TV. The digital streaming rights of the film were acquired by Amazon Prime Video. Bloody Beggar will stream on Prime Video from November 29 onwards.

== Reception ==
=== Critical response ===
Harshini SV of The Times of India gave 3/5 stars and wrote, "So even between some lags and a few jokes that don't land, Sivabalan's unique voice and Kavin's ambition to try something different echo strongly". A critic from Times Now gave 3/5 stars and wrote, "Bloody Beggar emerges as a promising film that successfully combines humor with deeper social commentary. Kavin's commendable performance and the film's engaging storytelling make it a worthy watch, especially for those looking for something unique during the festive season". Avinash Ramachandran of The Indian Express gave 3/5 stars and wrote "Bloody Beggar has the potential to draw you in with its quirks even when it leaves you grasping for a breather amidst all the cacophony and chaos." Anusha Sundar of OTT Play gave 3/5 stars and wrote "Bloody Beggar has a certain flavour to its writing, even as it faces some pacing issues." Janani K of India Today gave 2.5/5 stars and wrote "Had the makers opted for a taut screenplay and crisp editing, Bloody Beggar would have been a much more enjoyable affair." Kirubhakar Purushothaman of News 18 gave 2.5/5 stars and wrote "The film often relies on clichéd dialogues about greed and wealth, which prevent it from achieving the full impact it aims for."

Bhuvanesh Chandar of The Hindu wrote "An offbeat entry in the Diwali roster, Bloody Beggar is rich in entertainment, crafty world-building, and heart." Prashanth Vallavan of The New Indian Express wrote "The film starts off like a deceptively simple story, almost as if it has nothing to offer except for humour, [...] we realise that Bloody Beggar is rich of heart and storytelling." Latha Srinivasan of Hindustan Times wrote "On the whole, Bloody Beggar, in which we see some trademark Nelson Dilipkumar touches, is a decent attempt by Sivabalan Muthukumar. There is some lag in this illogically scripted film, which affects the audience’s engagement."
