= En Thangachi Padichava =

1988 film by P. Vasu

- Poster
- Directed by: P. Vasu
- Written by: P. Vasu
- Produced by: Mohan Natarajan; Tharangai V. Shanmugam
- Starring: Prabhu; Rupini; Chithra
- Cinematography: K. B. Dhayalan
- Edited by: P. Mohanraj
- Music by: Gangai Amaran
- Production company: Sree Rajakaali Amman Enterprises
- Release date: 15 July 1988
- Running time: 120 minutes
- Country: India
- Language: Tamil

En Thangachi Padichava (transl. My younger sister is educated) is a 1988 Indian Tamil-language drama film directed by P. Vasu. The film stars Prabhu, Rupini and Chithra. It was released on 15 July 1988. The film completed a 100-day run at the box-office. It was remade in Telugu as Muddula Mavayya (1989), in Hindi as Aaj Ka Arjun (1990) and in Kannada as Ravimama (1999).

== Plot ==
Dhanakodi, an honest police officer, is transferred to a small village. In this village, Karunakaran, a rich landlord, spreads terror among the villagers and threatens them to obtain their lands. After spending five years in jail for a murder, Periasamy is back to his village. Dhanakodi wants to trap the heartless Karunakaran at any cost.

In the past, Periasamy was an orphan who lived with his only sister Lakshmi. Lakshmi, after finishing her studies in the city, came back to her village. Periasamy and Valli were in love. She is still against Karunakaran's conspiracy. Lakshmi and Karunakaran's son Chinnaiah fell in love and got married with Periasamy's support. Chinnaiah went missing, while Lakshmi became pregnant. Lakshmi found out that Chinnaiah was in his father's house and it was Karunakaran's master plan. Periasamy went there, but he was humiliated by Karunakaran. In the meantime, Chinnaiah stabbed Lakshmi, and Lakshmi gave birth before dying. Enraged, Periasamy killed Chinnaiah. What transpires later forms the crux of the story.

== Cast ==
- Prabhu as Periasamy
- Rupini as Valli / Gauri
- Chithra as Lakshmi
- Nassar as Dhanakodi
- Kitty as Karunakaran
- Mohan Natarajan as Manikkam
- Ravikiran as Chinnaiah
- Vignesh as fighter
- Anandaraj as Gaja
- Sudha
- Mayilsamy as Constable
- Kullamani
- Karuppu Subbiah
- Vellai Subbaiah
- Pasi Narayanan

== Production ==
The film's shooting was held in Pollachi. It was P. Vasu's first solo direction in Tamil.

== Soundtrack ==
The soundtrack was composed by Gangai Amaran, who also wrote the lyrics. It is his 100th film as composer.

Song	Singer(s)	Duration
"Ethirkaalam Eni"	T. M. Soundararajan	4:03
"Maamanu Solla Oru Aalu"	Jayachandran, P. Susheela, S. P. Sailaja	5:16
"Nallakaalam Porandhurichi"	S. P. Balasubrahmanyam	4:32
"Poovellam Veedhiela"	Jayachandran	1:15
"Sondha Somaya Thooki Thooki"	K. J. Yesudas, K. S. Chithra	4:38
"Summa Summa Enna Paathu"	Malaysia Vasudevan, S. P. Sailaja	4:18

== Release and reception ==
En Thangachi Padichava was released on 15 July 1988, and became a success, running for over 100 days in theatres. NKS of The Indian Express wrote, "It's a difficult thing to comment on a patchwork quilt of this sort, which is what commercial films are." Jayamanmadhan of Kalki wrote the film is watchable due to the way the old story is presented.

== Remakes ==
En Thangachi Padichava was remade in Telugu as Muddula Mavayya (1989), in Hindi as Aaj Ka Arjun (1990), and in Kannada as Ravimama (1999).
