= Asuraguru =

2020 Indian Tamil-language action thriller film

- Theatrical release poster
- Directed by: A. Raajdheep
- Screenplay by: A. Raajdheep
- Story by: Kabilan Vairamuthu; Chandru Manickavasagam
- Produced by: JSB Sathish
- Starring: Vikram Prabhu; Mahima Nambiar; Subbaraju
- Cinematography: Ramalingam
- Edited by: Lawrence Kishore
- Music by: Simon K. King
- Production company: JSB Film Studios
- Distributed by: Shakti Film Factory
- Release date: 13 March 2020
- Running time: 122 minutes
- Country: India
- Language: Tamil

Asuraguru is a 2020 Indian Tamil-language action thriller film written and directed by A.Raajdheep, produced by JSB. Sathish under JSB film studios banner, dialogues penned by Kabilan Vairamuthu and Chandru Manickavasagam. The film stars Vikram Prabhu, Mahima Nambiar in lead roles while Subbaraju, Yogi Babu, and Nagineedu playing supportive roles in the film. The film is bankrolled by J.S.B. Sathish under his production company JSB Film Studios. The film released on 13 March 2020.

== Plot ==
The film starts off by showing Shakthi successfully robbing a moving train by cutting a hole in its roof. The police department appoints about-to-retire C. K. Manickavasagam to find out the culprit behind the train heist. Meanwhile, private detective Diya, who works exclusively for criminals, investigates a separate robbery from the car of a young man called Malik, son of the crime lord Jamalhudeen. Diya eventually comes across a video showing Shakti's face at the robbery.

Even whilst being pursued by Manickavasagam, Shakti carries out another heist from a flower market. The police chief and a few other officers get there immediately afterwards, but Shakti has already escaped. Everyone at the flower shop is arrested. Wanting to catch Shakti, he makes the IDCK bank put out a fake announcement. Shakthi's policeman friend Jagannathan warns him not to do it, but his urge to steal overcomes him, and he carries it out right under the nose of Manickavasagam, who was waiting in the bank.

Diya breaks into Shakti's house and waits for him to return. Shakti opens a secret door containing all the money he ever stole, before Diya knocks him unconscious and walks in. She calls Jamal and tells him where all his money is. Jagan eventually arrives and finds an unconscious Shakti and Diya in the room. After being accused by Diya of being criminals, Jagan explains that Shakti has had a mental disorder called kleptomania from childhood where he feels an incredibly strong urge to steal money for no reason at all. To help him curb his urges, Jagan became an officer in the economic crime department and always tells him where to steal illegal money. Diya helps the two escape from Jamal, who takes all the money from the room.

Manickavasagam eventually captures Sakthi and Jagan, then complains to them about a corrupt politician who intends on bribing other politicians to win an election. Shakthi offers to steal the money for him, and Manickavasagam accepts. Shakti does so successfully, but then Jamal and his thugs arrive at the scene and try to grab the money, but all his goons are eventually knocked out or killed by Shakti or Manickavasagam, and Jamal himself is shot. Then Manickavasagam reveals to Shakti that he too is a corrupt person, and intends on keeping the money for himself. Before he can shoot Shakthi, the other police officers come and stop him. Rather than arresting him, they choose to hush it up to save the reputation of the state police force. Shakti and Diya are thanked publicly, and it is announced that 15 lakh rupees will be paid to each of all the farmers in India using the stolen money.

== Cast ==
- Vikram Prabhu as Shakti
- Mahima Nambiar as Diya
- Subbaraju as C. K. Manickavasagam IPS
- Yogi Babu as 'Digital India' Dinakaran
- Jagan as Jagannathan
- Nagineedu as Jamaludhe
- Kumaravel as Kumaravel
- Manobala as Shakti's boss
- Jangiri Madhumitha as Officer Maheswari
- Anupama Kumar as Diya's mother
- Risha as Navya
- Boys Rajan as R. Rajesh Kanan
- Sampath Ram as Henchman
- Pasanga Sivakumar as Psychiatrist
- Robo Chandru as Police Officer
- Billy Murali
- Jai Murli Kanna as Young Shakthi

== Production ==
The project was commenced by A. Rajdeep who previously served as a former associate of director Mohan Raja, made his maiden directorial venture through this film. The film was apparently signed by Vikram Prabhu while he was busy shooting for his long-awaited film, Thuppakki Munai. The shooting of the film went on floors from 15 February 2018 and was mainly shot in Chennai and Udumalaipet. The principal photography of the film was commenced on 15 February 2018.

== Soundtrack ==
Asuraguru

Soundtrack album by Ganesh Raghavendra
- Released: 6 July 2019
- Recorded: 2019
- Studio: 2Keys Studio & PJ Studio
- Genre: Film soundtrack
- Length: 10:26
- Label: TrendMusic
External audio
- Audio Jukebox on YouTube

The soundtrack was composed by Ganesh Raghavendra with lyrics by Kabilan Vairamuthu and Ganesh Raghavendra.

Track listing
No.	Title	Lyrics	Singer(s)	Length
1.	"Evananalum"	Ganesh Raghavendra	Sivam	2:19
2.	"En Thani Iravu"	Kabilan Vairamuthu	Padmalatha	4:18
3.	"Villadhi Villi"	Kabilan Vairamuthu	Naresh Iyer, Rita	3:48
Total length:				10:26
