= Kabilan Vairamuthu =

Indian writer

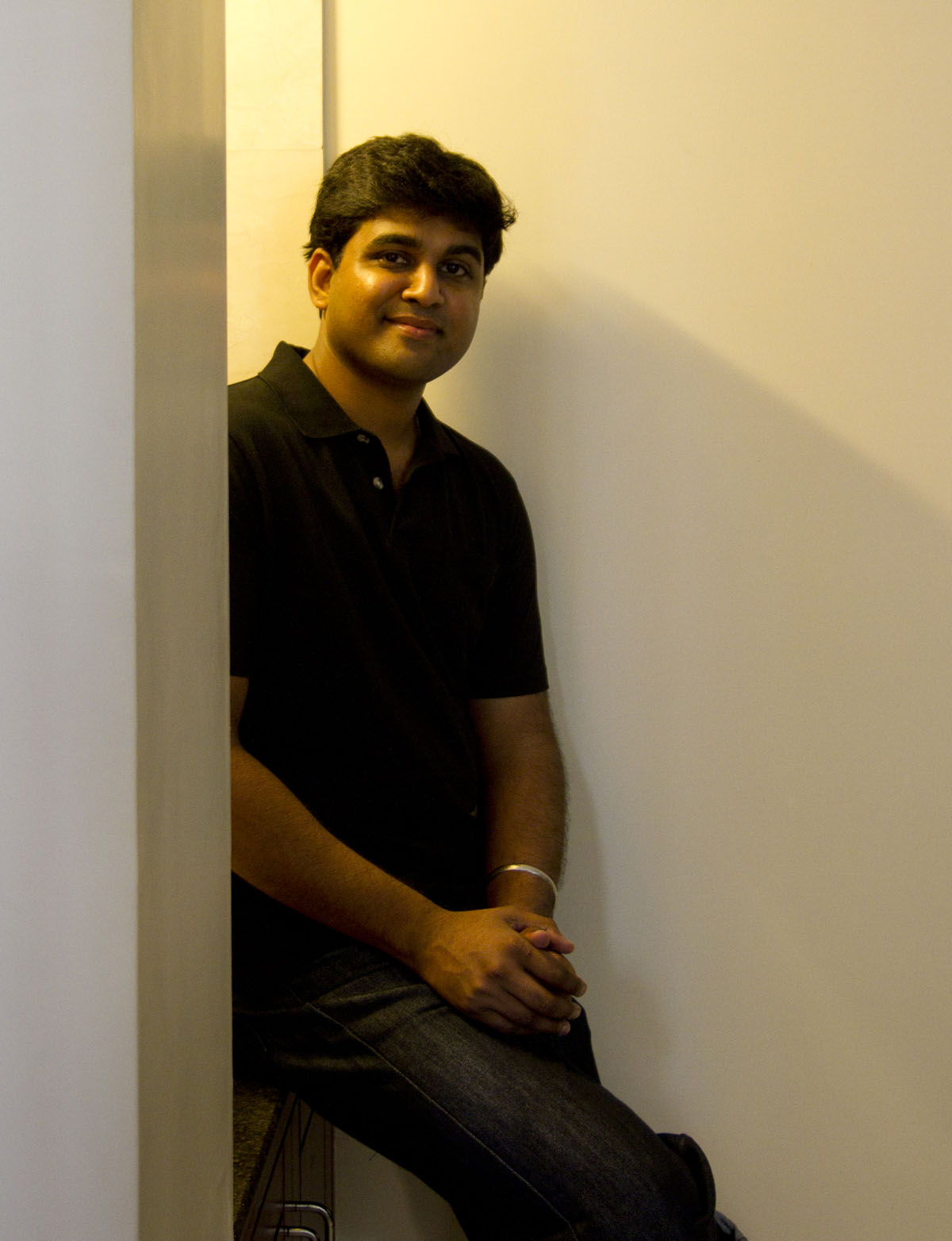
- Kabilan Vairamuthu
- Born: 29 May 1982 (age 44); Chennai, Tamil Nadu, India
- Occupations: Writer, activist
- Years active: 2002–present
- Spouse(s): Dr.Ramya (m.2010-present)
- Children: Mettoori (b.2012)
- Parent(s): Vairamuthu; Ponmani
- Relatives: Madhan Karky (Brother)

Kabilan Vairamuthu is an Indian writer, known for his work in Tamil literature and films. He is an engineering graduate who went on to pursue communication for social change at the School of Journalism, University of Queensland, Australia. After serving as an executive producer for programming and current affairs in the Tamil television industry for three-plus years, Kabilan is now a full-time writer in the Tamil film industry. He is the son of the famous Tamil poet and lyricist Vairamuthu.

Kabilan Vairamuthu published his first book when he was 18. He is the author of five poetry collections, two short story collections, and five novels. Vairamuthu represented Tamil Nadu at the Sahitya Akademi's Northeastern and Southern Poetry Forum 2014 held in Kochi. During his college days, he founded Makkal Anukka Peravai, a socio-political organization that works to address the self and social issues of the younger generation. The school functioned to re-culture and professionalize the political practices of the state, with the idea to create sensible substance and a feasible platform for young people to actively participate in development politics.

Kabilan Vairamuthu was honored with the Young Achiever Award by the office of former Indian President APJ Abdul Kalam.Kabilan Vairamuthu won the Paavai Institution’s Tamil Ilakkiya Chemmal award for his science fiction.

== Family ==
Kabilan Vairamuthu is the second son of authors Vairamuthu and Ponmani Vairamuthu. Ponmani, a Tamil scholar, published poetry collections and a novel and worked as a lecturer in Meenakshi College for Women, Chennai for 22 years. Kabilan's elder brother Madhan Karky has a doctorate in sensor networks and is a lyricist. Kabilan's wife Dr. Ramya, is a gynecologist and laparoscopic surgeon. Kabilan Vairamuthu's daughter Mettoori Kabilan is named after the family's ancestral village Mettoor.

== Education and career ==
Kabilan worked in a software company. After two years he decided to switch to journalism and media. He pursued his master's degree in Communication for Social Change in the University of Queensland, Australia.

Kabilan was involved in the launch of Puthiya Thalaimurai – a 24-hour news channel and Puthuyugam a GEC all in Tamil. The following were the shows produced so far:

Puthiya Thalaimurai

- Kalam Irangiyavargal (Anchor and Producer) – a show on young aspiring entrepreneurs
- Vidai Thedum Vivaathangal (Anchor and Producer) – A focus group on social issues

Puthu Yugam

- Thiramai Pongum Tamizhagam (Executive Producer) – showcasing interesting talents
- Gaanamum Kaatchiyum (Executive Producer) – a show which reviews film songs – a first time in television
- Vina Vidai Vettai (Executive Producer) – A quiz on India

== Poetry ==
- Ulagam Yaavayum
- Endraan Kavingan
- Manithanaku Aduthavan
- Kadavulodu Pechuvaarthai
- Mazhaiku othungum manbommai

== Short stories ==
- Kathai
- AmbaraaThooni (2020) – Kabilan Vairamuthu's second short stories collection. The compilation has stories of past, present, and future.

== Novels ==
- Boomerang Bhoomi – based on the historical connection between the South Indian race and the Australian aborigines, the novel is a message against global terrorism. Many research students from reputed universities across the state have chosen this novel for their academic papers.
- Uyirsol – a true story based on post-natal depression - the book carries a CD which has the theme song for the novel
- Meinigari - a novel based on making of a reality show in a general entertainment channel.
- Aagol - A socio political time travel novel on digital feudalism in the backdrop of the criminal tribe act
- Machiavelli Kaappiyam - a sequel to Aagol, advance neuro technology, deep history of the criminal tribe act & Internet independence are discussed in this sequel.
- Nithilan Vaakumoolam - the third and final chapter in the Aagol novel series, unfolds as a murder mystery, with a deep dive discussion on future artificial intelligence systems.

== Filmography ==
=== Screenwriting projects ===
- 2017 Kavan (based on Meinigari)
- 2017 Vivegam
- 2020 Asuraguru
- 2020 Thatrom Thookrom
- 2021 Thalli Pogathey
- 2024 Singappenney
- 2024 Indian 2

=== Lyrics ===
- Vavval Pasanga (2012)
- Udhayam NH4 (2013)
- Poriyaalan (2014)
- Jeeva (2014)
- Vennila Veedu (2014)
- Anegan (2015)
- Sivappu (2015)
- Vellaiya Irukiravan Poi Solla Maatan (2015)
- Peigal Jaakkirathai (2016)
- Kalam (2016)
- Arthanari (2016)
- Kavan (2017)
- Vivegam (2017)
- Aayirathil Iruvar (2017)
- Indrajith (2017)
- Traffic Ramasamy (2018)
- Imaikka Nodigal (2018)
- Vantha Rajavathaan Varuven (2019)
- Embiran (2019)
- July Kaatril (2019)
- Comali (2019)
- Kaappaan (2019)
- Meendum Oru Mariyathai (2020)
- Naan Sirithal (2020)
- Asuraguru (2020)
- Thatrom Thookrom (2020)
- Naanum Single Thaan (2021)
- Thalli Pogathey (2021)
- The Great Indian Kitchen (2023)
- Indian 2 (2024)
- The Greatest of All Time (2024)

=== Independent songs ===
- Yenthiru Anjali Yenthiru
- Mandhira Kannilae
- ‘’Chinnanjiru Paadalgal’’

== Documentary ==
- Ilaingargal Ennum Naam
