= Radhika Preethi =

Indian actress

- Born: 20 January 1997 (age 29); Bengaluru, Karnataka
- Other name: Monika
- Occupation: Actress
- Years active: 2017–present

Radhika Preethi (born 20 January 1997) is an Indian actress who primarily appears in Tamil films and television shows apart from Kannada films. She is known for Poove Unakkaga, which aired on Sun TV.

== Career ==
Radhika Preeti made her debut in 2017 with the Kannada film Naa Panta Kano (2017) under the stage name of Rithiksha before starring in Raja Loves Radhe (2018). She forayed into Tamil cinema through Embiran (2019). She gained recognition for her role in the 2020 Tamil television series Poove Unakkaga before she left the series in 2022. In 2023, she acted opposite Santhanam in the comedy film 80s Buildup playing the lead female role.

== Filmography ==
Year	Title	Role	Language	Notes	Ref.
2017	Naa Panta Kano		Kannada	credited as Ritiksha	
2018	Raja Loves Radhe	Radha	Kannada		
2019	Embiran	Jeya	Tamil		
2022	Naadhiru Dhinna	Pooja	Tamil		
2023	80s Buildup	Devi	Tamil		

=== Television ===
Year	Show	Role	Network	Notes
2020-2022	Poove Unakkaga	Poovarsi	Sun TV	
2026	Ayali	Reshma	Zee Tamizh	
2026	Panchanama		ZEE5	
