= Kalyaan =

Indian film director and screenwriter

- Born: S. Kalyaan
- Occupations: Director, screenwriter
- Years active: 2014–present

Kalyaan is an Indian film director and screenwriter who has been working in Tamil film Industry. He is notable for his commercially successful films, Gulaebaghavali (2018) and Jackpot (2019).

== Career ==
Kalyaan made a breakthrough as a potential director after winning the second season of the Tamil reality show, Naalaiya Iyakkunar.

He began making his directorial debut film, Katha Solla Porom in 2014, but the film did not find distributors and was put on hold. He then began work on Kaathadi, during October 2014. Sai Dhanshika was signed on to play a police officer, while Avishek Karthik, previously seen in Gautham Vasudev Menon's Vaaranam Aayiram (2008) and Nadunisi Naaygal (2011), was selected to portray the lead actor. The film began production in late 2014 and was revealed to be in post-production by October 2015. The movie was shot extensively in Chennai, Kerala and Yelagiri hills. A long delay before the release of the film meant that the two other films of Kalyaan, Katha Solla Porom (2016) and the Prabhu Deva-starrer Gulaebaghavali (2018), were released before Kaathadi, which released in February 2018.

== Filmography ==
Year	Film	Notes
2016	Katha Solla Porom	
2018	Gulaebaghavali	
2018	Kaathadi	
2019	Jackpot	
2022	Repeat Shoe	
2023	Ghosty	
2023	80s Buildup	
