= Redin Kingsley =

Indian actor and comedian

- Born: 16 April 1977 (age 49); Tuticorin, Tamil Nadu, India
- Citizenship: Indian
- Occupation: Actor
- Years active: 2018–present
- Spouse: Sangeetha V. (m. 2023)
- Children: 1

Redin Kingsley (born 16 April 1977) is an Indian actor and comedian who predominantly works in the Tamil film industry. He is best known for his loud style of speech and comedic expressions in films.

== Career ==
Redin initially was a dancer and was featured in a song in the film Aval Varuvala (1998). He was also an event organizer for government exhibitions in Chennai and Bangalore before entering into the film industry as an actor. His debut film, a 2012 project called Vettai Mannan featuring Silambarasan directed by Nelson Dilipkumar, was shelved. Later in 2018, he properly debuted in Nayanthara's Kolamaavu Kokila, again directed by Nelson.

After appearing in minor roles in a few films, Kingsley rose to fame following roles in Netrikann and Doctor in 2021. He has also starred in Rajinikanth's Annaatthe (2021) and Jailer (2023) as well as Vijay in Beast (2022). He starred in Vadivelu's comedy film Naai Sekar Returns (2022). He was part in films such as Va Varalam Va (2023), Conjuring Kannappan (2024) and Good Bad Ugly (2025).

== Personal life ==
Redin Kingsley married television actress Sangeetha on 10 December 2023. They have a daughter born in 2025.

== Filmography ==
Key
†	Denotes films that have not yet been released

=== Tamil films ===
Year	Title	Role	Notes
1998	Aval Varuvala	Dancer in 'Rukku Rukku' song	Uncredited role
2018	Kolamaavu Kokila	Tony	Debut film
2019	LKG	Ramraj Pandian's henchman	
2019	Gurkha	Hacker	
2019	A1	Mani	
2019	Jackpot	Tumbler	
2021	Netrikann	Babu	
2021	Doctor	Bhagath	SIIMA Award for Best Comedian; Ananda Vikatan Cinema Award for Best Comedian
2021	Annaatthe	Pulipandi	
2022	Idiot	Burfi	
2022	Beast	Jack	
2022	Kaathuvaakula Rendu Kaadhal	Arnold	
2022	The Warriorr	Prisoner	Bilingual film
2022	Repeat Shoe	Maari's sidekick	
2022	Coffee with Kadhal	Vichu	
2022	Agent Kannayiram	Medical Shop Staff	
2022	Kaari	Sethu's friend	
2022	Gatta Kusthi	Temple donation group chief	
2022	Dha Dha		
2022	Naai Sekar Returns	Raakozhi	
2023	Ghosty	Mental hospital patient	
2023	Pathu Thala	Kuttapare	
2023	Soppana Sundari	Vijith	
2023	Rudhran	Sketch	
2023	DD Returns	Benny	
2023	Jailer	Divya Nathan	
2023	Partner	Narrator	Voice role
2023	Mark Antony	Maserati	
2023	80s Buildup	Chitra Guptan	
2023	Annapoorani	Chinto Chin	
2023	Va Varalam Va		
2023	Conjuring Kannappan	Dr. Johnny	
2023	Sarakku		
2024	Ninaivellam Neeyada		
2024	The Boys	Exorcist	
2024	Hit List	Vijay's neighbour	
2024	Vasco Da Gama	Arivazhagan	
2024	Hitler	Karukkavel	
2024	Bloody Beggar	Hariharan	
2024	Kanguva	Accelerator	
2024	Jolly O Gymkhana	Bus Conductor	
2025	Baby and Baby	Inspector Kuzhanthaivelu	
2025	Aghathiyaa	Double Pandi	
2025	Sabdham	Arogiyam	
2025	Leg Piece		
2025	Perusu	Satish	
2025	Sweetheart!	Condom Brand Ambassador	
2025	Good Bad Ugly	Convict	
2025	Devil's Double Next Level	Gopal	
2025	Chennai City Gangsters	Manda Kolaaru	
2025	Oho Enthan Baby	King	
2025	Desingu Raja 2	Sundar	
2025	Muthal Pakkam		
2025	Blackmail		
2025	Padaiyaanda Maaveeraa	Vaithi	
2025	Bison Kaalamaadan	Arulraj	
2025	Mask	Attack Arun	
2025	Revolver Rita	Cheetah	
2026	Lockdown		
2026	TN 2026	Kangeyan Singaraj	

=== Other language films ===
Year	Film	Role	Language	Notes
2022	The Warriorr	Prisoner	Telugu	Bilingual film
2024	KA	Subbu	Telugu	
2024	Max	Sebastian	Kannada	
2025	Hari Hara Veera Mallu		Telugu	
2025	Maine Pyar Kiya		Malayalam	
2025	Karam	Bhaskar	Malayalam	
2025	Bha Bha Ba	Yogi	Malayalam	
