= Ghosty (film) =

2023 Indian Tamil horror film

- Theatrical release poster
- Directed by: Kalyaan
- Written by: Kalyaan
- Starring: Kajal Aggarwal; Yogi Babu; K. S. Ravikumar; Redin Kingsley
- Cinematography: Jacob Rathinaraj
- Edited by: Vijay Velukutty
- Music by: Sam CS
- Production company: Seed Pictures
- Release date: 17 March 2023
- Running time: 140 minutes
- Country: India
- Languages: Telugu, Tamil, Hindi

Ghosty is a 2023 Indian Tamil-language comedy horror film written and directed by Kalyaan, and produced by Seed Pictures. It stars Kajal Aggarwal, Urvashi, Yogi Babu, Redin Kingsley, K. S. Ravikumar and Sathyan. The film was released on 17 March 2023, and marked the final appearance of Manobala who died on 3 May 2023. The film received negative reviews from critics.

== Plot ==
Aarthi is a police inspector whose ultimate goal is to find and arrest an accused criminal named Daas who escaped from her father's custody 20 years back. She takes over the case and desperately searches for him. During her travels, a shootout happens, causing Aarthi to shoot and kill another person, thinking it was Daas. She manages to hide her mistake without affecting her job or the interrogation of Daas's case. In the second half of the film, Aarthi faces a bad occult presence at her home. How she tackles it and her efforts to find and arrest Dass forms the rest of the story.

== Cast ==
- Kajal Aggarwal as Aarthi
- Urvashi as Aadhi
- Yogi Babu as Asurvel Mental hospital patient
- Redin Kingsley as Amarvel Mental hospital patient
- K. S. Ravikumar as Das
- Jagan as Mental hospital patient
- Thangadurai
- Sathyan as Mayil
- Aadukalam Naren as Priest
- Manobala as Priest
- Motta Rajendran as Motta (Mental Hospital warden)
- Mayilsamy as security
- Swaminathan as doctor
- Devadarshini
- Suresh Chandra Menon as Police Commissioner
- Subbu Panchu
- Livingston
- Santhana Bharathi
- Madhan Bob
- T. M. Karthik as Police officer
- R. N. R. Manohar
- Sriman as doctor
- Kalairani as Robert's owner
- KPY Bala
- Ajay Rathnam as DGP
- Jai (guest appearance)
- Kiranmai as Mental hospital patient
- Radhika Sarathkumar (guest appearance)

== Production ==
Kajal Aggarwal did a promo shoot for the film in July 2021. The film's release date was announced as 17 March 2023.

== Reception ==
The film was released on 17 March 2023 in theatres. Logesh Balachandran from The Times of India gave it 1.5 stars out of 5 and stated that "Overall, Ghosty is another Tamil film that fails to do justice to the horror-comedy genre". Chandhini R from Cinema Express gave a negative review and gave a 1.5 rating out of 5. India Herald critic wrote that "the movie fall flates with viewers because of its weak one-liners and ridiculous circumstances." A Dinamalar critic gave the film a negative review and 1 star out of 5. A Maalai Malar critic gave 2.5 out of 5 and gave a mixed review.
