= Then Chennai =

2024 Tamil thriller film by Ranga

- Theatrical release poster
- Directed by: Ranga
- Written by: Ranga
- Produced by: Ranga
- Starring: Ranga; Riya Murugan; Nitin Mehta; Elango Kumanan
- Cinematography: Sarathkumar Mohan
- Edited by: Elangghovan C M
- Music by: Songs: Siva Pathmayan; Score: Jen Martin
- Production company: RFC Productions
- Release date: 13 December 2024
- Country: India
- Language: Tamil

Then Chennai (transl. South Chennai) is a 2024 Indian Tamil-language action thriller film written, produced and directed by Ranga. He also stars alongside Riya Murugan, Nitin Mehta, Elango Kumanan, Vatsan M Natarajan and others. The film has music composed by Jen Martin, cinematography handled by Sarathkumar Mohan and editing by Elangghovan C M. It was released in theatres on 13 December 2024.

== Plot ==
Jason, a former Navy officer turned restaurant owner, discovers an abandoned child during the Covid lockdown. As he navigates the challenges of caring for the child, he finds support in Dr. Mega. As their bond deepens, Jason and his uncle Tony gets caught in a standoff between Rudranath's Security team and a mysterious gang. Will he overcome the unexpected obstacles and win her love?

== Cast ==
- Ranga as Jason
- Riya Murugan as Dr.Mega
- Nitin Mehta as Ex Colonel Rudranath
- Elango Kumanan as Tony
- Vatsan M Natarajan as Sandeep
- Aaru Bala as Cook Babu
- Dhileepan as Inspector
- Suma as Jason's Mother
- Ram
- Vishal

== Production ==
Set in South Chennai, the film is written, directed, and produced by a newcomer Ranga under his Ranga Film Company banner. He also plays the lead role. The technical crew consists of Sarathkumar Mohan as cinematographer, Elangghovan C M as editor, Hareram S as Co-Director and Chittacang as DI.

== Music ==
The background score is composed by Dada (2023) and Bloody Beggar (2024) fame Jen Martin as music composer. Only Melody Song "Puthu Vaanam Puthu Bhoomi" composed by independent Music Composer "Siva Pathmayan". This song lyrics written by Ranga and sung by Naresh Iyer. Background Score and Audio Music rights were acquired by AP International. "Video Title". AP International. 23 August 2024.

== Release ==
=== Theatrical ===
Then Chennai was released in theatres on 13 December 2024 across Tamil Nādu.

=== Home media ===
Initially movie was streamed on Tentkotta OTT platform - Tamil from 31 January 2025. Now began streaming in Dish TV's "Watcho" OTT platform

== Reception ==
A critic from Dina Thanthi wrote that the first half of the film may have been a bit slow in some places, but the latter half of the film was fast-paced. Siva Padmayan and Jen Martin's music is a strength of the film. Director Ranga Nathan has kept the central theme of restoring the ancestral place and has moved the scenes in a different direction in a lively and interesting way. A critic from Hindu Tamil Thisai wrote that if the pace of the first half had been corrected to be slick like the second half, Then Chennai would have been included in the list of thrilling family thrillers.

A critic from Dinakaran wrote that the film is a family action thriller drama and the screenplay should have been fast-paced. The reviewer added that the underwater scenes were canned in a commendable manner. A critic from News Today wrote, "Despite minor screenplay flaws, the film’s heart lies in its sincere storytelling and authentic portrayal of a middle-class family’s struggles. With its fresh premise, gripping moments, and earnest performances, Then Chennai is an engaging entertainer worth watching".
