= Muddula Mavayya =

- Theatrical release poster
- Directed by: Kodi Ramakrishna
- Written by: Ganesh Patro (dialogues)
- Screenplay by: Kodi Ramakrishna
- Story by: P. Vasu
- Based on: En Thangachi Padichava (Tamil)
- Produced by: S. Gopal Reddy
- Starring: Nandamuri Balakrishna; Vijayashanti; Seetha
- Cinematography: K. S. Hari; Tirunavukkarasu
- Edited by: K. Satyam
- Music by: K. V. Mahadevan
- Production company: Bhargav Art Productions
- Release date: 7 April 1989
- Running time: 138 minutes
- Country: India
- Language: Telugu
- Box office: ₹5.5 crores(equivalent to ₹95 crores or US$14 million in 2016)

Muddula Mavayya is a 1989 Indian Telugu-language drama film directed by Kodi Ramakrishna and produced by S. Gopal Reddy on Bhargav Art Productions banner. It stars Nandamuri Balakrishna and Vijayashanti with music composed by K. V. Mahadevan. The film was a remake of the Tamil film En Thangachi Padichava (1988). Muddula Mavayya was a major commercial success, running for 100 days in 29 centres.

== Cast ==
- Nandamuri Balakrishna as Raja
- Vijayashanti as Vidya
- Seetha as Lakshmi
- Gollapudi Maruthi Rao as Vidya's grandfather
- Raja Krishnamoorthy as Ranga Rao
- Anandaraj as Gaja
- Subhalekha Sudhakar as Raja's friend
- Ahuti Prasad as New Inspector
- Brahmaji as Drunkard
- Hema
- Eeswar Rao as Subba Rao Master
- Balaji as Villager
- Ravi Kiran as Chinna
- KK Sarma as Constable
- Telephone Satyanarayana as Old Inspector
- Chidatala Appa Rao as Butler Bajana Sundaram
- Kallu Chidambaram as Panthulu
- Juttu Narasimham as Butler Gajakarna
- Brahmanandam
- Anitha as Raja's mother
- Chandrika as Servant
- Master Amith as Raja's son-in-law

== Music ==
Muddula Mavayya

Film score by K. V. Mahadevan
- Released: 1989
- Genre: Soundtrack
- Length: 26:42
- Label: LEO Audio
- Producer: K. V. Mahadevan

K. V. Mahadevan chronology
Janaki Ramudu (1988)	Muddula Mavayya (1989)	Muddula Menalludu (1990)

Music was composed by K. V. Mahadevan. Audio soundtrack was released on LEO Audio Company label.

No.	Title	Lyrics	Singer(s)	Length
1.	"Hey Raja"	Vennelakanti	S. P. Balasubrahmanyam	4:27
2.	"Changu Changu"	C. Narayana Reddy	S. P. Balasubrahmanyam, S. Janaki	4:09
3.	"Mavayya Anna Pilupu"	Vennelakanti	S. P. Balasubrahmanyam, P. Susheela, S. P. Sailaja	4:46
4.	"Aaku Chatuna"	C. Narayana Reddy	S. P. Balasubrahmanyam, S. Janaki	4:06
5.	"Chukkesukochanammo Choodu"	C. Narayana Reddy	S. P. Balasubrahmanyam, S. P. Sailaja	3:58
6.	"Om Shanti"	Vennelakanti	S. P. Balasubrahmanyam, P. Susheela	5:07
Total length:				26:42

== Reception ==
The film was a major box-office success, running for 100 days in 29 centres. It also set a new record, doubling the previous 100-day performance record.
