= Naa Panta Kano =

- Directed by: S. Narayan
- Written by: S. Narayan
- Story by: Amid
- Produced by: K. Subramanyam
- Starring: Anup Revanna; Ritiksha
- Cinematography: Mathew Rajan
- Edited by: Harish
- Music by: S. Narayan
- Production company: Devasenaa Arts
- Release date: 23 June 2017
- Running time: 142 minutes
- Country: India
- Language: Kannada

Naa Panta Kano (also known simply as Panta) is a 2017 Indian Kannada-language heist thriller film directed and scored music by S. Narayan. It features Anup Revanna and newcomer Ritiksha in the lead. The story is written by Amid and the cinematography is by Mathew Rajan. The film is a remake of Tamil film Rajathandhiram (2015).

The project officially took off on 9 June 2016 and was launched by the Chief Minister Siddaramaiah in Bangalore. The film was released on 23 June 2017.

== Cast ==
- Anup Revanna as Arjun
- Ritiksha
- Ravi Kale
- Kari Subbu
- Irfan
- MLA Srinivasa Murthy
- Gaddappa in a special appearance
- Singrigowda in a special appearance

== Soundtrack ==
Panta

Soundtrack album by S. Narayan
- Genre: Feature film soundtrack
- Language: Kannada
- Label: Anand Audio
- Producer: S. Narayan

The film's score and the soundtrack were composed by S. Narayan. Actor Sudeepa has recorded his voice for one of the songs. Initially planned to have only two songs, as a last minute addition, an item song was included in the track list and delayed the film release.

Tracklist
No.	Title	Lyrics	Singer(s)	Length
1.	"Ivale Nanna Hudugi"	S. Narayan	Sudeepa
2.	"Tunturu"	S. Narayan	Shaan, Shreya Ghoshal
3.	"Kuluku Kuluku"	S. Narayan	Malathy Lakshman

== Reception ==
A. Sharadhaa of The New Indian Express wrote, "This new-age thriller is for all kinds of audience but whether the plot will keep them on the edge of their seats is something for them to judge". Shyam Prasad S of Bangalore Mirror wrote, "Panta could have been a good thriller. But the first half is drowsy. It is only in the second half that it takes on some character. There are a few nicely created roles. But many of the minor characters played by non-professional actors kills the thrills".
