= Kaali Venkat =

Indian actor

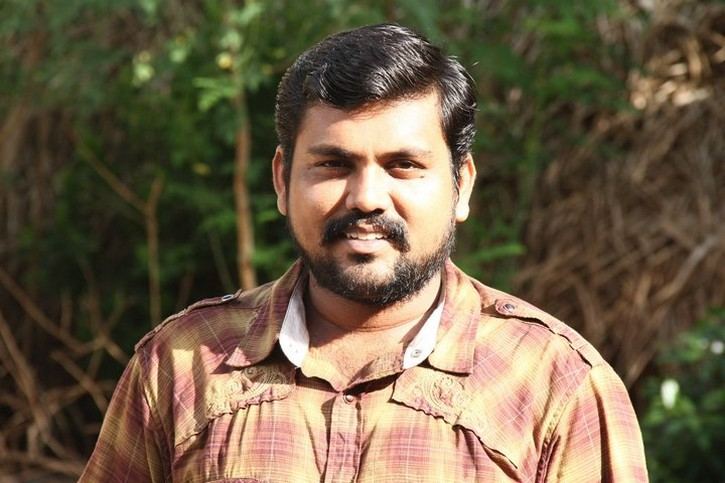
- Venkat in 2014
- Born: Venkat; 16 November 1982 (age 44); Kovilpatti, Thoothukudi, Tamil Nadu, India
- Occupation: Actor
- Years active: 2008–present
- Spouse: Janani (m. 2017)
- Children: 1

Kaali Venkat (born 16 November 1982) is an Indian actor who mainly appears in Tamil language films in supporting roles.

== Personal life ==
Venkat hails from Kudaiyadevanpatti a village near Kovilpatti. Venkat used to act in plays during his school days. With an ambition to act in films he moved from his village to Chennai in 1997 to enter the Tamil film industry. In Chennai, he was doing jobs like selling groceries in order to survive until he met director Vijay Prabakaran. Prabakaran, who Venkat considers his guru, coached and taught him "everything I know about cinema today".

Venkat married Janani on 30 October 2017, and has a son born in December 2018.

== Career ==
Before entering films, Venkat worked in theatre. The first film he acted was also by Vijay Prabhakaran, Thasaiyinai Thee Sudinum. The film failed to release but Venkat decided to keep his character name in it, Kaali, as his screen name after everybody on the set was calling him by that name. He then acted in various short films made for the Kalaignar TV show Naalaya Iyakkunar and won the Best Actor in a Series Award in Season 3 of the show. After a series of small roles in various feature films, he first gained attention with his role in the action drama Thadaiyara Thaakka. The short films fetched him small roles in bigger projects like Kalakalappu and Udhayam NH4. He played a substantial role in mystery thriller Thegidi, which went on to become a sleeper hit and Venkat stated that he was flooded with friend requests on Facebook post the film's release.

Venkat has acted in a number of films, including Mundaasupatti (2014), India Pakistan (2015), Urumeen (2015), Eetti (2015) and Kaathadi (2018). Mundaasupatti, based on the same-titled short film which Venkat was also part of, will see him playing the role of an assistant photographer called Azhagumani. In 2016, Kaali portrayed a drunkard father in Irudhi Suttru and a loyal friend of a politician in Kodi. In 2020, he appeared in Suriya's Soorarai Potru. Kaali Venkat bagged several awards for his role in Gargi (2022). In 2024, he has performances in films like Captain Miller, Kurangu Pedal and Lubber Pandhu, among others. He played the lead in Dhonima. His character is a flawed alcoholic who brings nothing but trouble to his family.

== Filmography ==
=== Films ===
†	Denotes films that have not yet been released

Year	Title	Role	Notes
2010	Va	Mano	
2010	Agam Puram	Sangu's henchman	Uncredited
2010	Nellu	Kaalimuthu	
2011	Sabash Sariyana Potti	Sekhar	
2011	Theneer Viduthi	Tea stall owner	
2011	Mounaguru	Hospital compounder	
2012	Thadaiyara Thaakka	Alphonse	
2012	Kalakalappu	Raghu's friend	
2013	Udhayam NH4	Constable Anbu	
2013	Pizza II: Villa	Ponraj	
2013	Vizha	Paandidorai (Paandi)	
2014	Vu	Veerakumar	
2014	Kerala Nattilam Pengaludane	Kesavan	
2014	Pannaiyarum Padminiyum	Villager	
2014	Kerala Nattilam Pengaludane	Kesavan	
2014	Vaayai Moodi Pesavum	Palani	
2014	Thegidi	Nambi	
2014	Poovarasam Peepee	Magudi	
2014	Mundaasupatti	Azhagumani (Azhagu)	
2015	India Pakistan	Selvam	
2015	Maari	Constable Aarumugam	
2015	Sathuran	Kumar	
2015	Urumeen	Sudanthiram (Suda)	
2015	Eetti	Senthil	
2016	Irudhi Suttru	Saamikannu / Samuel	
2016	Saala Khadoos	Saamikannu / Samuel	Hindi film
2016	Miruthan	Traffic Constable Chinamalai	
2016	Mapla Singam	Anbuchelvan's cousin	
2016	Darling 2	Rafi	
2016	Theri	Constable Ganesan	
2016	Katha Solla Porom	Kaali	
2016	Iraivi	Bhagyam	
2016	Raja Manthiri	Suriya	
2016	Kodi	Bhagat Singh	
2017	Enakku Vaaitha Adimaigal	Mohideen	
2017	Kattappava Kanom	Keechan	
2017	Maragadha Naanayam	Chidambaram, Mahendran (voice)	Dual roles
2017	Pichuva Kaththi	Sampath	
2017	Mersal	Poongodi's father	
2017	Uruthikol	Munusamy	
2017	Annadurai	Karna	
2017	Velaikkaran	Vinoth	
2018	Titanic Kadhalum Kavundhu Pogum	Bhoomi	Unreleased
2018	Nagesh Thiraiyarangam	Kaala	
2018	Kaathadi	Muruga	
2018	Irumbu Thirai	Gnanavel Raja	
2018	Ghajinikanth	Uthaman	
2018	Ratsasan	Venkat	
2018	Aan Devathai	Kaali	
2018	Maari 2	Sub-Inspector Aarumugam	
2019	Kazhugu 2	Kaali	
2019	Magamuni	Doctor Raghu	
2019	Petromax	Thangam	
2020	Soorarai Pottru	Kaali	
2020	Thatrom Thookrom	Pandian	
2020	Kanni Raasi	Detective Jaishankar	
2021	Eeswaran	Astrologer Kaali	
2021	Sarpatta Parambarai	Koni Chandran	
2021	4 Sorry	Selvi's uncle	Anthology film; third segment
2021	Thalli Pogathey	Omkar	
2021	Onaan	Guna	
2022	Veerapandiyapuram	Solomon	
2022	Ayngaran	Ezhumalai	
2022	Don	Professor Arivu	
2022	1945	Krishna	
2022	Gargi	Adv. Indrans Kaliyaperumal	Won, SIIMA Award for Best Supporting Actor; Won, Ananda Vikatan Cinema Award for Best Supporting Actor; Won, Filmfare Award for Best Supporting Actor – Tamil
2022	Dejavu	Ezhumalai	
2022	Sinam	Head Constable Kadal	
2022	Nitham Oru Vaanam	Prabha's assistant	
2022	Gatta Kusthi	Adv. Sattanathan	
2023	Rudhran	Shakti	
2023	Veeran	Narayana	
2023	Kadapuraa Kalaikuzhu	"Thavil" Thangarasu	
2023	Aneethi	Thiru's father	
2023	Echo	Murugan	
2023	Pizza 3: The Mummy	Daamu	
2023	Harkara	Kaali	
2023	Kida	Vellaichamy	
2024	Captain Miller	Kumastha Kanagasabai	
2024	Double Tuckerr	Right	
2024	Dear	Saravanan	
2024	Kurangu Pedal	Kandasamy	
2024	Dhonima	Kotti	
2024	Lubber Pandhu	Karuppaiya	
2024	Baby John	Amba's father	Hindi film
2024	Alangu	Malayan	
2025	Test	Bharani	
2025	Madras Matinee	Kannan	
2025	Good Day	Nehru	
2025	Jenma Natchathiram	Rajesh	
2025	Thalaivan Thalaivii	Amarasigamani	
2025	House Mates	Ramesh Kumar	
2025	Coolie	Palanisamy	
2025	Bomb	Kathiravan	
2025	Diesel	Bhoominathan	
2025	Middle Class	Maara	
2025	Kombuseevi	Police constable	
2026	Parasakthi	Thambiraja Mill owner	
2026	Vengeance	Veni's foster father	
2026	Chinna Chinna Aasai		Malayalam film
2026	Gatta Kusthi 2	Sattanathan alias Sattam	
2026	Idhayam Murali	Auto Driver	
2026	Arulvaan		
2026	Vishwanath & Sons	Shiva	
2026	Enemy of the Smuggler		
2026	Titanic	Bhoominathan	

=== Web series ===
Year	Title	Role	Platform	Notes
2018	Vella Raja	Pugazhendi	Amazon Prime Video	
2019	Thiravam	Sengi	ZEE5	
2022	Paper Rocket	Francis	ZEE5	
2024	Parachute	Charles	Disney+ Hotstar	
2026	Warrant: From the World of Vilangu	Rengasamy	ZEE5	
