= Government Mappillai =

- Directed by: Manivannan
- Written by: Manivannan
- Produced by: G. S. Madhu
- Starring: Anandaraj; Kasthuri
- Cinematography: D. Sankar
- Edited by: P. Venkateswara Rao
- Music by: Deva
- Production company: Madhu Films International
- Release date: 6 March 1992
- Running time: 145 minutes
- Country: India
- Language: Tamil

Government Mappillai (transl. Government son-in-law) is a 1992 Indian Tamil language action drama film directed Manivannan. The film stars Anandaraj and Kasthuri. It was released on 6 March 1992.

== Plot ==
Sundarapandian, an angry orphan, is the henchman of a rich man Manivannan and often went to jail for minor offences. Karthikeyan enters his house as a servant and falls in love with his daughter Kalyani. In the meantime, Mallaria, an orphan, tries to reform Sundarapandian and they fall in love. One day, a poor girl Chellayi is raped and killed by a corrupted MLA. Sundarapandian and Mallaria finally get married, they decide to leave the village but they don't have enough money. Manivannan prepares his daughter's wedding with the MLA and Manivannan orders Sundarapandian to kill the innocent Karthikeyan. Sundarapandian, who is now a good man, decides to join the young pair. What transpires later forms the crux of the story.

== Cast ==
- Anandaraj as Sundarapandian
- Kasthuri as Mallaria
- Ramkumar as Karthikeyan
- Saradha Preetha as Kalyani
- Manivannan as Manivannan
- Senthil as Chokka
- Delhi Ganesh as Karthikeyan's father
- Vasu Vikram as MLA
- Ponvannan
- Vasudevan
- Periya Karuppu Thevar
- Kennedy
- Ragasudha as Chellayi
- Vijayadurga as Arukkani
- Janaki as Karthikeyan's mother
- Vasu

== Soundtrack ==
The soundtrack was composed by Deva, with lyrics written by Kalidasan.

Song	Singer(s)	Duration
"Chinna Ponnu"	Krishnaraj, K. S. Chithra	4:16
"Ilavatta Poove"	S. P. Balasubrahmanyam, K. S. Chithra	4:39
"Mama Mama Unnai"	K. S. Chithra, S. P. Balasubrahmanyam	4:15
"Manusanukku"	Malaysia Vasudevan	4:11
"Oru Veppamara Thoppu"	S. P. Balasubrahmanyam, Deva, Swarnalatha	4:58
"Sontham Embathu"	Krishnaraj	3:14
"Sottu Sottaga"	Krishnaraj, K. S. Chithra	4:30
