= Anandaraj =

Indian actor (born 1963)

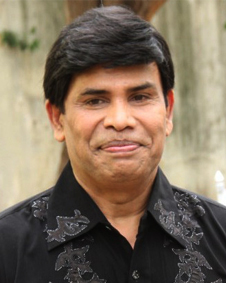
- Born: 10 November 1958 (age 68); Pondicherry, Puducherry, India
- Education: M.G.R. Government Film and Television Training Institute
- Occupation: Actor
- Years active: 1988–present
- Political party: All India Anna Dravida Munnetra Kazhagam
- Partner: Thilakavathi
- Children: 2

Anandaraj (born 10 November 1958) is an Indian actor. He has acted in mainly in villain roles and comedic roles in several Tamil films and appeared in over a three hundred films in different languages including Telugu, Kannada, Malayalam and Hindi.

== Early life ==
Anandaraj was born and brought up in Pondicherry. After schooling, his father wanted him to become a police officer, but Anandaraj wanted to try something different as he was fascinated with films. His family supported his dreams. He joined M.G.R. Government Film and Television Training Institute, Chennai for a course. Kannada actor Shiva Rajkumar was his classmate.

== Career ==
Anandaraj was under the impression that offers would come his way, but later he had to struggle for an opportunity and finally started off with the 1988 film Oruvar Vaazhum Aalayam, starring Prabhu and Sivakumar, and later En Thangachi Padichava, directed by P. Vasu, gave him the much-needed break in all the four south Indian languages. He did Suresh Krissna’s Raja Kaiya Vacha (1990) with Prabhu, in which he essayed a positive role. However, he appeared with Vijayakanth and starred in several films together.

On playing the hero roles, Anand Raj mentioned: "When one gets popular being a villain, people around you always push you to take the next step and it was one of those phases when I took up offers to play the lead role". He went on to play lead roles in the films Palaivana Paravaigal, Kaaval Nilayam, Thambi Oorukku Puthusu, Government Mappillai, Pokkiri Thambi, Kizhakku Veluthathchu, David Uncle, En Rajangam, Puthiya Aatchi and My India. Even though directors offered him good scripts, the films just didn't work well at the box office. The huge popularity that Anandaraj gained during the late eighties elevated him to the status of hero and he and R. Sarathkumar together starred in a few action films. While Sarathkumar hit stardom, Anandaraj who was billed above him in their films together did not sustain his position and went back to playing small roles.

He has acted as a villain alongside most of the top actors, like Balakrishna (Muddula Mavayya), Vijayakanth (Pulan Visaranai), Chiranjeevi (Gang Leader), Rajinikanth (Baashha), Mammootty (Makkal Aatchi), R. Sarathkumar (Suryavamsam), Arjun (Ezhumalai) and Vijay (Pokkiri).

Anandaraj made a switch to comedy in Mundasupatti, directed by Ramkumar and released in 2014.

Director Prabhu Deva offered Anandaraj the lead in the role and asked him not to react to anything, even though a baddie is expected to give exaggerated expressions. Prabhu Deva wanted Anandaraj to sport a certain look, so he underwent intense training for a year and lost about 12 kilos and fulfilled Prabhu Deva's expectation to get signed for Action Jackson (2014). He played a don in the film and his look was completely different from the one he had tried in the south, as he spots a lizard tattoo on his head.

He joined Vijay Sethupathi and Nayanthara starrer Naanum Rowdydhaan (2015). Though Anandaraj doesn't play the main antagonist role. His other films include Maragadha Naanayam (2017) Katha Nayagan (2017), Sathya (2017) and Gulaebaghavali (2018). He's almost perfected the role of the comic villain. For the film Jackpot (2019), Anandaraj received Best comedian from Vikatan. He played a role in Bigil (2019) has expressed his disappointment over the filmmaker for the way he approached his character in the film in post production. He acted in Santhanam's films subsequently such as Biskoth (2020), Dikkiloona (2021) and 80s Buildup (2023).

== Personal life ==
Anandaraj was born in Puducherry. He is the second son in the family of eight. He is married and has a daughter, a son and a grandson

== Politics ==
Actor Anandraj is loyal to Jayalalitha and has joined AIADMK under her leadership. He supported BJP and stated that he will personally vote for the party in 2014. After Jayalalitha's death he quit ADMK. He later said Mudaliar community should vote for NOTA.

== Filmography ==
=== Tamil films ===
Year	Film	Role	Notes
1988	Oruvar Vaazhum Aalayam	Henchmen	
1988	Thaimel Aanai	Johnny	
1988	Jeeva	Main Henchmen	
1988	En Thangachi Padichava	Gaja	
1988	Paatti Sollai Thattathe	Autorickshaw driver	
1988	Senthoora Poove	Udayappan	
1988	Thaai Paasam		
1988	Kalicharan	Anandraj	
1989	Pillaikkaga	Nagadevan	
1989	Rajadhi Raja	Kangeyan	
1989	Vettaiyaadu Vilaiyaadu	Maruthupandi	
1990	Nalla Kaalam Porandaachu	Joe	
1990	Pulan Visaranai	Dharma	
1990	Paattukku Naan Adimai	Vajervelu	
1990	Pudhu Padagan	Arumugam	Guest appearance
1990	Thangathin Thangam	Mariappan's Son	
1990	Kalyana Rasi	Periyathambi	
1990	Urudhi Mozhi	Johnny	
1990	Ulagam Pirandhadhu Enakkaga	Kumar	
1990	Periya Idathu Pillai	Anand	
1990	Velai Kidaichuduchu	Baasha	
1990	Palaivana Paravaigal	Machi	
1990	Vellaiya Thevan	Semmangkalai	
1990	Namma Ooru Poovatha	Rajappa	
1990	Raja Kaiya Vacha	Japan	
1990	Ethir Kaatru	Devaraj	
1991	Kaaval Nilayam	Raja	
1991	Maanagara Kaaval	Robin	Cinema Express Award for Best Villain
1991	Iravu Sooriyan		
1991	Moondrezhuthil En Moochirukkum	Amirtharajah	
1991	Thambi Oorukku Pudhusu		
1992	Government Mappillai	Sundarapandian	
1992	Unna Nenachen Pattu Padichen	Maarithevan	
1992	Bharathan	Gangadharan	
1992	Pokkiri Thambi	Thambidurai	
1992	Kizhakku Velathachu		
1992	Thaali Kattiya Raasa		
1992	David Uncle	David	
1993	Kattalai		
1993	Rajadurai	Mayandi	
1994	En Rajangam	Gopalakrishnan	
1994	Vandicholai Chinraasu	Santhanapandian	
1994	Jallikattu Kaalai	Loose Gounder	
1994	Magudikkaran		
1995	Baashha	Indaran	
1995	Kattumarakaran		
1995	Thottil Kuzhandhai	Rajarathnam	
1995	Puthiya Aatchi	Marappan	
1995	Nandhavana Theru	Rajasekhar	
1995	Thirumoorthy	Govindan	
1995	Thedi Vandha Raasa		
1995	Mr. Madras	Thiruttani	
1995	Makkal Aatchi	Rangachari	
1995	Ragasiya Police	Azhagam Perumal	
1995	Maaman Magal	Paramasivam	
1995	Thondan	Ilavenil	
1995	Varraar Sandiyar	Maruthu	
1996	Aruva Velu	Alavanthar	
1996	Kizhakku Mugam	Nagaraj	
1996	Sengottai	Inspector Thangamani	Guest appearance
1996	Manikkam		
1996	Andha Naal	Father James	
1997	Aravindhan	Ramanathan	
1997	My India		
1997	Suryavamsam	Dharamalingam Gounder	Tamil Nadu State Film Award for Best Villain; Cinema Express Award for Best Villain
1997	Abhimanyu		Guest appearance
1997	Adimai Changili		
1997	Janakiraman		
1997	Arasiyal	Vikram	Guest appearance
1998	Moovendhar	Velliangiri	
1998	Naam Iruvar Nammaku Iruvar	Thief	
1998	Sandhippoma		
1998	Kalyana Galatta		
1998	Simmarasi	Maragatham	Dinakaran Cinema Award for Best Villain Actor
1998	Desiya Geetham		
1998	Urimai Por	J. K. B.	
1998	Pudhumai Pithan		Guest appearance
1998	Pooveli	Maha's uncle	
1999	Periyanna		
1999	Kummi Paattu	Pachhamalayan	
1999	Oruvan	Peter Fernandez	
1999	Malabar Police	Varadappan	
1999	Kannupada Poguthaiya	Maniyaandar	
1999	Kanmani Unakkaga	Prathap	
1999	Unnaruge Naan Irundhal	Jamindar	
1999	Paattali	Rajarathinam	
1999	Time	Local Rogue	
2000	Vaanathaippola	Rajadurai	
2000	Vetri Kodi Kattu	Dubai Job Agency's Middleman	
2000	Krodham 2	Yogaraj	
2000	Anbudan		
2000	Vanna Thamizh Pattu	Rasappan	
2000	Independence Day		
2001	Seerivarum Kaalai	Police Inspector	
2001	Narasimha	Thilagarnambi	
2002	Varushamellam Vasantham	Police Inspector	Guest Appearance
2002	Ezhumalai	Nagalingam's brother in law	
2002	Style	Marthandam	
2003	Aasai Aasaiyai	Commissioner Srinivas IPS	
2003	Kadhaludan		Guest appearance
2003	Yes Madam		
2003	Sena	Mastan Bhai	
2003	Diwan	Meenakshi's father	
2003	Vadakku Vaasal	Inspector Alex Pandian	
2004	Campus		
2004	Engal Anna	Durairaj	
2004	Arasatchi	Advocate Brammanadham	
2004	Giri	Pasupathy, Pasupathy's father	
2004	Meesai Madhavan	Rani's father	
2005	Iyer IPS	Pasupathy	
2005	Kannadi Pookal	Sakthivel's Friend	
2006	Perarasu	DCP Kesavan Nair	
2007	Pokkiri	Narasimha	
2008	Ashoka	Chandramohan	
2008	Vallamai Tharayo	Nandita's father	
2008	Nayagan	Gang leader	
2009	Villu	J.D	
2010	Kola Kolaya Mundhirika	Veerappan	
2010	Goa	Village Rowdy	
2010	Indrasena		
2010	Agam Puram	Muthuraj	Guest appearance
2011	En Ullam Unnai Theduthey		
2014	Mundasupatti	Zamindar Ekambaram	
2015	Pulan Visaranai 2	John	
2015	Paayum Puli	Inspector Manikandan	
2015	Naanum Rowdydhaan	Pondicherry Don	
2016	Dhilluku Dhuddu	Kumar's father	
2017	Bruce Lee	Inspector Shanmugapandiyan	
2017	Maragadha Naanayam	'Twinkle' Ramanathan	
2017	Katha Nayagan	Dubai Sheik	
2017	Sathya	Inspector Chowdhary	
2018	Gulaebaghavali	Munish's boss	
2018	Thaanaa Serndha Koottam	Gandhi Appa (Kuthaalingam)	
2018	Pakka	Nattamai	
2018	Iravukku Aayiram Kangal	Murugesan	
2018	Kalavani Mappillai	Thulasi's father	
2018	Evanukku Engeyo Matcham Irukku	Annachi	
2018	Johnny	Prakash	
2018	Silukkuvarupatti Singam	Share Auto Chandran	
2019	Ayogya	'Bullet' Rajendran	
2019	Gurkha	Alex	
2019	Jackpot	Maanasthan / Inspector Maanasthi	Ananda Vikatan Cinema Award for Best comedian
2019	Bigil	Anand (Rock)	
2020	Biskoth	Narasimhan	
2021	Vanakkam Da Mappilei	Ramachandran	
2021	Dikkiloona	Arivu's Boss	
2022	Idiot	Raasu Gounde	
2022	Cobra	Laundry Man	
2022	Prince	Inspector Muthupandi	
2022	Naai Sekar Returns	Dass	
2023	Vallavanukkum Vallavan	Inspector Poonthamalli	
2023	Rayar Parambarai	Gopal, Mortuary worker	
2023	80s Buildup	Gopal	
2023	Conjuring Kannappan	Devil Armstrong	
2024	Vithaikkaaran	‘Dollar’ Azhagu	
2024	Uyir Thamizhukku	Pazhakadai Ramachandran	
2024	Vasco Da Gama	Lakshana's father	
2025	Baby and Baby	Rajan	
2025	Chennai City Gangsters	Split Soosai	
2025	Madharas Mafia Company	Pungavanam	
2025	Galatta Family	Singa Pandian	
2026	Vaa Vaathiyaar	M. G. Ramachandran imitator	
2026	Love Insurance Kompany	H. A. Subbu	
2026	Scene	Irudhayaraj	

Key
†	Denotes films that have not yet been released

=== Telugu films ===
Year	Film	Role	Notes
1989	Bamma Maata Bangaru Baata	Anasuya's husband	
1989	Muddula Mavayya	Gaja	
1989	Palnati Rudraiah		
1989	Lankeswarudu	Ananth Raj	
1989	Ontari Poratam	Govinda Yadav	
1989	Two Town Rowdy	Rowdy	
1990	Inspector Rudra		
1990	Prananiki Pranam	Bahadoor	
1990	Iddaru Iddare	Teja	
1991	Sathruvu	Satya Murthy	
1991	Gang Leader	Kanakambaram	
1993	Bava Bavamaridi	Bhoopati	
1995	Pedarayudu	Bhupathi	
1996	Ramudochadu	Gavaraju	
1997	Shubhakankshalu	Moses	
1997	Taraka Ramudu	Gajapati's brother-in-law	
1998	Suryavamsam	Singaraju Lingaraju	
2002	Seema Simham	Police Inspector	
2002	Bharatasimha Reddy	Devudayya's brother-in-law	
2002	Siva Rama Raju	Veeraju Varma	
2002	Chennakesava Reddy	Dhanunjaya Reddy	
2003	Raghavendra	Ankineedu	
2003	Inspector	Pandey	
2003	Avuna		
2003	Tiger Harischandra Prasad	Killer Koteswar Rao	
2005	786 Khaidi Premakatha	Harischandra Prasad	
2009	Adhineta	Mahendra Bhupati	
2016	Parvathipuram		Dubbed in Telugu as Veera Khadgam (2023)
2024	Inti No. 13	Gajanand	

=== Other language films ===
Year	Film	Role	Language
1994	The City	Raja	Malayalam
1994	Jaana	Anand	Kannada
1996	Palegara		Kannada
1997	Raaja		Kannada
2000	Mahathma		Kannada
2000	Papigala Lokadalli		Kannada
2000	Krishnarjuna		Kannada
2000	Independence Day		Kannada
2003	Kiccha	Minister	Kannada
2003	Vijaya Dashami		Kannada
2004	Sathyam	Commissioner Mambally Mukundan Menon	Malayalam
2006	Jayam	Bharathan	Malayalam
2008	Indra		Kannada
2009	Machaa		Kannada
2010	Meshtru		Kannada
2011	Doubles	Pathan	Malayalam
2012	Swaranjali		Kannada
2014	Action Jackson	Xavier Fonseca	Hindi
