= Vasco Da Gama (film) =

Indian fantasy comedy film

- Theatrical release poster
- Directed by: RG Krishnan
- Written by: RG Krishnan
- Produced by: DATO’ B. Subaskaran
- Starring: Nakkhul; K. S. Ravikumar; Vamsi Krishna; Arthana Binu
- Cinematography: N.S. Sathish Kumar
- Edited by: Tamil Kumaran
- Music by: Arun NV
- Production company: 5656 Production
- Distributed by: Blockbuster Production
- Release date: 2 August 2024
- Running time: 124 minutes
- Country: India
- Language: Tamil

Vasco Da Gama is a 2024 Indian Tamil-language fantasy comedy film written and directed by RG Krishnan. The film stars Nakkhul, K. S. Ravikumar, Vamsi Krishna and Arthana Binu along with Anandaraj and Munishkanth in supporting roles. The film was released on 2 August 2024 to mixed reviews, with some critics praising its inventive inverted-world premise while others criticised its execution.

== Cast ==
- Nakkhul as Vasudevan
- K. S. Ravikumar as Uthaman (Marco) & Binu (Gabbar) (Dual Role)
- Vamsi Krishna as Kovarthan
- Arthana Binu as Lakshana
- Anandaraj as Lakshana's father
- Munishkanth as Vasudevan's uncle
- Mansoor Ali Khan as Police inspector
- Prem Kumar as Mahadevan
- Madhan Bob as Superintendent K. Subash
- R. S. Shivaji as Phillips
- Redin Kingsley as Arivazhagan
- Cell Murugan as Mr. Perfect
- T. M. Karthik as Doctor
- Ravi Mariya as Politician
- Vasu Vikram as P. Punith
- Badava Gopi as Rajangam
- Namo Narayana as Samarasan
- Bayilvan Ranganathan as Prisoner
- Lollu Sabha Seshu as Ravanan
- Lollu Sabha Manohar as Govind's father
- Sundarapriya MP as Neighbour
- Yogi Ram as Kaal
- Bijili Ramesh as Bijili

== Production ==
The entire shooting was completed on 1 May 2023. The film was produced by DATO’ B. Subaskaran under the banner of 5656 Production. The cinematography was done by N.S. Sathish Kumar while editing was handled by Tamil Kumaran and music composed by Arun NV.

== Reception ==
The film received mixed reviews, with some critics praising its inventive inverted-world premise and world-building, while others criticised the execution and screenplay.
