= Kurangu Pedal =

Indian drama film

- Theatrical release poster
- Directed by: Kamala Kannan
- Written by: Kamala Kannan
- Based on: Cycle by Rasi Alagappan
- Produced by: Sivakarthikeyan; Savitha Shanmugam; SuMee Baskaran; Sanjay Jayakumar
- Starring: Santhosh Velmurugan; V. R. Ragavan; M.Gnanasekar
- Cinematography: SuMee Baskaran
- Edited by: Shivanandeeswaran
- Music by: Ghibran
- Production company: Sivakarthikeyan Productions
- Release date: 3 May 2024
- Country: India
- Language: Tamil

Kurangu Pedal (transl. Monkey pedal) is a 2024 Indian Tamil-language drama film written and directed by Kamala Kannan. The film stars Santhosh Velmurugan, V.R.Ragavan and M.Gnanasekar in the lead roles. The film was produced by Sivakarthikeyan, Savitha Shanmugam, Sanjay Jayakumar and SuMee Baskaran under the banner of Sivakarthikeyan Productions.

== Plot ==
Mariappan, a spirited fifth-grader living in Katheri in the 1980s, resolves to master bicycling during summer vacation. This sets the scene for a life-altering adventure with his father and friends.

== Cast ==
- Santhosh Velmurugan as Mariappan
- V. R. Ragavan
- M. Gnanasekar
- Rathish
- Sai Ganesh
- Kaali Venkat as Kandasamy
- Prasanna Balachander as Cycle shop owner
- Jenson Dhivakar
- Dhakshana as Mariappan's sister

== Reception ==
Logesh Balachandran of The Times of India rated 3 out 5 and stated that "Kurangu Pedal indeed manages to provide a nostalgic journey with its nuanced character portrayals and engaging writing". A critic from Hindu Tamil Thisai noted that "Although there are some flaws in the second half, you can forget it and enjoy it. Actor Sivakarthikeyan can be proud of making such a simple and beautiful film" and gave the film a rating of three out of five stars.

Gopinath Rajendran of The Hindu stated that the film is an "An off-balanced yet heart-warming tale on childhood aspirations".

A critic from Cinema Vikatan gave a mixed review.

Anusha Sundar of OTTplay rated the film two-and-a-half out of five stars and stated that "Kurangu Pedal is a film that doesn’t scream big emotions, because it tucks away all its learnings much like the father character, to its nooks and corners of one-liners. It has some tough walls to break and had it only, it would have won the race in the most glorious fashion."

== See also ==
- List of films about bicycles and cycling
