= Gulaebaghavali =

- Theatrical release poster
- Directed by: Kalyaan
- Written by: Kalyaan
- Produced by: Kotapadi J Rajesh
- Starring: Prabhu Deva; Hansika Motwani; Revathi
- Cinematography: R. S. Anandakumar
- Edited by: Vijay Velukutty
- Music by: Vivek–Mervin
- Production company: KJR Studios
- Distributed by: Mishri Enterprises
- Release date: 12 January 2018
- Country: India
- Language: Tamil

Gulaebaghavali (/ɡʊleɪbəɡɑːvəli/) is a 2018 Indian Tamil-language heist action comedy film written and directed by Kalyaan and produced by KJR Studios. The film stars Prabhu Deva and Hansika Motwani, with Revathi, Ramdoss, Anandaraj, Rajendran, and Yogi Babu in supporting roles. Revathi reprises her role as Maasha from Arangetra Velai (1990). The music was composed by Vivek–Mervin with cinematography by R. S. Anandakumar and editing by Vijay Velukutty. The film released on 12 January 2018.

== Plot ==
The story opens in 1945, during British India rule. A British gentleman and his porter try to catch a ferry at Madras Port. On the way, however, the porter drops one of the suitcases and opens it, revealing many priceless diamonds. The porter steals the diamonds by wrapping them in his veshti and smartly hides them from sight. He puts stones inside the suitcase and sends the gentleman on his way. He cuts the diamonds carefully and hides them in a trunk, which he buries near a temple in the Gulaebaghavali village.

The story then shifts to 2018, where Maasha deceives Mayilvaganam and leads him to believe her son is dead. Then, she steals his black BMW car and sells it for money. Meanwhile, Badri and his boss Nambi perform petty thefts for a living. While at a pub, Badri spots Viji and falls for her. Soon, due to a misunderstanding, Badri unknowingly agrees to steal a priceless statue from the temple at Gulaebagavali and runs into Viji. The duo escapes from the villagers' hands and falls into the hands of a businessman named Sampath and his brother-in-law, who is also Munish's boss. Nambi and Munish's boss forcefully send Badri and Viji to Gulaebaghavali to steal the trunk (a photo reveals that the businessman is the porter's grandson).

With some help from Munish and Maasha, they steal the chest. Munish opens it, and a skeleton is inside. After a lot of confusion, they delivered the trunk. Everyone soon discovers that the skeleton has the diamonds stored inside. After a long argument, the police arrive at the spot and realize that the diamonds have immense value. After they escape from the police, Viji's cousins discover that a hand of the skeleton fell into Maasha's car. A flashback reveals that when everyone was grabbing the skeleton, it broke apart, and its hand fell into Maasha's car during the fight. On finding this out and how Maasha tried to deceive the other three, the trio chases her. A parallel storyline involves Mayilvaganam and a don named Annachi, ultimately culminating in the climax.

== Cast ==
- Prabhu Deva as Badri
- Hansika Motwani as Viji
- Revathi as Maasha
- Ramdoss as Munish
- Anandaraj as Munish's boss and Sampath's brother-in-law
- Rajendran as Annachi
- Sathyan as Mayilvaganam
- Mansoor Ali Khan as Nambi
- Yogi Babu as Panni
- Vela Ramamoorthy as Village Head
- Madhusudhan Rao as Sampath
- Nalinikanth as Sampath's father
- Ambani Shankar as Maari
- Divya Krishnan as Annachi's wife
- T. M. Karthik
- Cool Suresh as Car Driver
- Supergood Subramani
- Vinod Sagar
- Subhashini Kannan as young Mayilvaganam's mother
- Baby Vaishnavi
- Nagendra Prasad (special appearance in the song "Guleba")

== Production ==
In April 2017, Prabhu Deva agreed terms to work on a fantasy adventure comedy film titled Gulaebaghavali under the direction of Kalyaan, who had previously made Katha Solla Porom (2016). Hansika Motwani, who had earlier worked in Prabhu Deva's productions and directorial projects, was cast to play the leading female role opposite him. Produced by KJR Studios, the makers also cast Revathi in a pivotal role, while a bevy of supporting actors including Ramdoss, Yogi Babu, and Anandaraj were also recruited. A first look poster was released in May 2017, with Deva and Hansika revealed to be portraying con artists. Following the release of Baahubali: The Conclusion (2017), the team actively decided to enhance the film's budget on costumes to ensure a rich production value appeared on screen. The makers of the film included a scene which makes a reference to the 1955 film of the same name, with Kalyaan devising a special flashback sequence to connect the two films. For a particular set in the film, the art director created a replica of the Hanging Gardens of Babylon at a cost of two crores.

== Soundtrack ==
Gulaebaghavali

Soundtrack album by Vivek–Mervin
- Released: 24 December 2017
- Genre: Film soundtrack
- Length: 18:02
- Label: Think Music India
- Producer: Vivek–Mervin

Vivek–Mervin chronology
| Dora (2017) | Gulaebaghavali (2017) | Mohini (2018) |

The film's music was composed by duo Vivek–Mervin, in their fourth film venture following Vadacurry (2014), Aambala (2015) and Nannbenda (2015). The soundtrack was released on 24 December 2017 through Think Music India.

Track listing
| No. | Title | Lyrics | Singer(s) | Length |
|---|---|---|---|---|
| 1. | "Guleba" | Ku Karthik | Anirudh Ravichander, Mervin Solomon | 4:37 |
| 2. | "Seramal Ponnal" | Ko Sesha | Mervin Solomon, Sameera Bharadwaj | 5:11 |
| 3. | "Heartukulla" | Pa. Vijay | Nakash Aziz, Sanjana Diwakar | 3:51 |
| 4. | "You're The One" | Ko Sesha, Inno Genga | Inno Genga | 4:23 |
| Total length: | | | | 18:02 |

== Release ==
Tamil Nadu theatrical rights of the film were sold for ₹5 crore. The film began streaming on Sun NXT from 9 February 2018, even before its television premiere on Sun TV.

== Reception ==
On the review aggregator website Rotten Tomatoes, 83% of 6 critics' reviews are positive, with an average rating of 5/10.

M Suganth of The Times of India gave 3/5 stars and wrote, "Debutant Kalyaan’s writing and filmmaking might lack finesse but he makes up for it with confident narration, never letting the film slip into a lull." Mythily Ramachandran of Gulf News wrote, "Gulaebagavalli makes no pretensions about its motive. It’s an entertainer and succeeds in doing just that. As long as you don’t take it seriously, Gulaebagavalli is ideal to keep your stress at bay."

Haricharan Pudipeddi of Firstpost gave 2.5/5 stars and wrote, "Gulaebaghavali doesn’t quite excel in the writing or execution, but what it still manages to achieve — thanks to some well thought out comic stretches — is to entertain in installments." Karthik Kumar of Hindustan Times gave 2.5/5 stars and wrote, "Gulebaghavali, despite being flawed, works to an extent, thanks to the comic angle it brings to the proceedings. If only it showed more creativity in writing, especially in the first half hour, it could have ended up as a worthy competitor to Maragatha Naanayam."

Ashameera Aiyappan of The Indian Express gave 2/5 stars and wrote, "Gulaebaghavali is a mindless caper that relies on its laughs to help the viewer ride through the logic loopholes." Udhav Naig of The Hindu wrote, "Filmmaker Kalyaan may not have delivered a funny heist film, but it is not totally unwatchable either."

== Awards and nominations ==
| Date of ceremony | Award | Category | Recipient(s) and nominee(s) | Result | Ref. |
|---|---|---|---|---|---|
| 5 January 2019 | Ananda Vikatan Cinema Awards | Best Comedian – Female | Revathi | Won | |
| 5 January 2019 | Ananda Vikatan Cinema Awards | Best Dance Choreographer | Jani Master | Won | |
| 16 August 2019 | 8th South Indian International Movie Awards | Best Comedian – Female | Revathi | Nominated | |
