= Embiran =

Film directed by Krishna Pandi

- Directed by: Krishna Pandi
- Produced by: Panchavarnam
- Starring: Rejith Menon; Radhika Preethi; T. S. B. K. Moulee
- Cinematography: M. Pugazhenthi
- Edited by: D. Manoj
- Music by: Prasanna
- Production company: Panchavarnam Films
- Release date: 22 March 2019
- Country: India
- Language: Tamil

Embiran is a 2019 Indian Tamil language thriller film directed by Krishna Pandi and produced by Panchavarnam. The film stars Rejith Menon, Radhika Preethi, and T. S. B. K. Moulee. The music was composed by Prasanna with cinematography by M. Pugazhenthi and editing by D. Manoj. The film released on 22 March 2019.

The story revolves around two young people from different professions who fall in love with each other.

== Cast ==
- Rejith Menon as Priyan
- Radhika Preethi as Jeya
- T. S. B. K. Moulee as Jeya's grandfather
- Kalyani Natarajan as Priyan's mother
- Kishore Dev as Arun
- Manish as Suresh
- Villiyappan
- Aattukutty Murugesan as Gardener
- Porkodi as Dr. Renu Paul

== Filming ==
The film has been shot around Tamil Nadu and Pondicherry.

== Soundtrack ==
The film has music by Prasanna, who has previously created music for Yagavarayinum Naa Kaakka (2015). It features lyrics by Kabilan Vairamuthu. The songs are mostly montages and features one song in duet.

Tamil

No.	Title	Lyrics	Singer(s)	Length
1.	"Nee Thondrum Oru Nodiyinil"	Kabilan Vairamuthu	Nincy Vincent	4:08
2.	"Nesam Puthu Sesam"	Kabilan Vairamuthu	Vijay Yesudas	4:45
3.	"Aazhmanadhil"	Kabilan Vairamuthu	Sathyaprakash Dharmar	2:52

== Release ==
New Indian Express called it "an uninteresting film that romanticizes stalking".
