= Ayynoorum Ayynthum =

- First look poster
- Directed by: Stanzin Raghu
- Written by: Stanzin Raghu
- Produced by: Accessible Horizon Films
- Starring: Deepak Sundararajan; Shankar; Living Smile Vidya; Chinnu Kuruvilla; T. M. Karthik; Lakshmi Priyaa Chandramouli
- Cinematography: Maverick Dass; Gerald
- Edited by: Stanzin Raghu; Ramesh Mourthy
- Music by: Balaji; Ramanujam; S. Sivapragasam (BGM)
- Production company: Accessible Horizon Films
- Release date: 30 April 2016 (online)
- Running time: 120 minutes
- Country: India
- Language: Tamil

Ayynoorum Ayynthum (transl. Five hundred, and five) is a 2016 Indian Tamil-language anthology drama film written and directed by Stanzin Raghu starring Deepak Sundararajan, Shankar, Living Smile Vidya, Chinnu Kuruvilla, T. M. Karthik, and Lakshmi Priyaa Chandramouli in the lead roles.

== Plot ==
The story is about the bizarre journey of a 500-rupee note through 5 different characters and how they perceive it in their own ways.

=== Adiyalukku Podiyaal (The goon's stooge) ===
Sudalai (Deepak Sundararajan) is a superstitious goon's stooge who wants to become a don. Will he realize his dream or will his misplaced sense of self get in the way of it?

=== Mr. Adi? Director Adi? ===
Adi (Shankar) is a successful film director who is separated from his wife thanks to his philandering ways. He is desperate to redeem himself and get her back. Will he be able to?

=== Number Sollunga (Number please) ===
Sundari (Living Smile Vidya) is a spunky woman who works at a phone recharge shop. All she wants is to safeguard the souvenir her boyfriend gives her. Will she hold onto it?

=== Jenny's Shadow ===
Jenny (Chinnu Kuruvilla) is a volatile, troubled woman who lives in a world where she walks a fine line between psychedelic reality and nightmarish fantasy. Will she rise above it or get sucked into a self-destructive vortex of darkness?

=== Agni Kunjondru Kanden (I found a spark of fire) ===
A nameless, avant-garde revolutionary (T. M. Karthik) who lives without money ignites an unprecedented rebellion with which he threatens to raze down the hyper-capitalistic juggernaut.

Though the film follows the 500-rupee note, it actually focuses on the 5 key characters whose lives are entirely and contrastingly different from each other in the way they look at money.

== Cast ==
Adiyalukku Podiyaal	Mr. Adi? Director Adi?	Number Sollunga
Deepak Sundarrajan as Sudalai; Vinoth Michael as Maari Joseph; Ramesh Mourthy as Periya Annan; Ravichandran as Pazhani; Delhi Master as Veeramani; Jegan as Veeramani's henchmen; Karthi as Inspector; Jacob as Constable; Baskar as Student Adiyaal; Binish as Beating Adiyaal; Suresh as Beaten-up Adiyaal; Sarathkumar as Teacher Boy	Shankar as Adi; Lakshmi Priyaa Chandramouli as Anu; Toot Machi (Ranga) as Driver Ravi; Prasoon as Partho; Shruti as Shruti; Mahima Thangappan as Sini; Ravi as Suryaprakash; Nagesh Friend as Producer Santhanam; Rashmi as herself; Sowmya as herself; Veerabahu as Customer; Saravana Kumar B. S. as Customer	Living Smile Vidya as Sundari; Vishwanth as Bala; Karthikeyan as Boss; Dilsa as Bike Guy; Raj Bharath as Bike Guy; Sharmila as Police Officer; Hari Narayanan as Constable; Suraj as Teenager; Bhumika as T. G. Madhu; Janakiraman Thatha as Thatha; Mani as Cop beaten up Guy; Lakshmi as Cell Customer; Gandhi as Cell Customer
Jenny's Shadow	Agni Kunjondru Kanden	Transition characters
Chinnu Kuruvilla as Jenny; Raghu as Karan; Kavitha as Pragya; Rengarajan as AK; Muthu as AK's runner; King Segar as Dope House Guy; Pradeep as Dope House Guy; Sundar as Dope House Guy; Uday as Dope House Guy; Mithran as Dope House Guy; Viji as Dope House Girl; Kousalya as Dope House Girl	T. M. Karthik as The Radical; Venkat Desikan as Rajan; Manoj as Shekar; Suresh as Alif; Sivaramakrishnana as Kasi; Karthik as Murali; Kumar as Mayilu; Sadiq Basha as MLA Murugesan; S. Ramanujam as Other Dad; Dhanasekhar as Party Man; Selvam as Party Man; Mohandass as Reporter; Mani as Selvam; Anand as Man; Raja as Man	Warrant Bala as Man counting currency; Rajasegar as Receiving Man; Palavedu Village as Boys fighting; Hasan as College Guy; Navin as College Guy's friend; Jegan Mohan as Traffic Cop; Arun as Cheated Guy; Shankar IAS as Cheated Guy's friend; Ashok (Printers) as Family Dad; Gangadharan as Family Son; Kumaran (Caresquare) as Pickpocket; Baskar as Silrai Guy; Kumar as Beggar; Jeganathan as Shopkeeper; Pavendran as Random Bike Guy

== Production ==
After struggling to find producers and financing in a conventional way, the Accessible Horizon Films team decided that they had to something radical. But still, money was a big hurdle to get their scripts produced. That is when during and after several discussions about "money", the team decided to make their film about money (a 500-rupee note) and perceptions about it. Once the core concept "the journey of a 500-Rupee note" was decided, director Raghu wrote the screenplay in 15 days at a single stretch. Some of the characters of the film are loosely inspired from real life like the "money-less revolutionary" character played by T. M. Karthik, was inspired from people like Mark Boyle, Heidemarie Schwermer, and Suelo, among others. The casting of the film took two months with intense audition sessions held in Chennai, except for one character, Jenny, which took almost four months because of the character's extreme nature. Several of the key cast members hail from a theater background with performances in Tamil, English, and Malayalam. The entire shooting schedule took about 21 days split over three to four schedules.

A one-minute trailer drew attention as soon as a promo was released on YouTube. A 5K marathon run was conducted to promote the concept of a world without money, and around 150 people participated in that marathon.

== Soundtrack ==
500&5 (Ayynoorum Ayynthum)

Soundtrack album by S. Balaji & S. Ramanujam
- Released: 26 July 2012
- Genre: Feature film soundtrack
- Length: 23:49
- Language: Tamil
- Label: Accessible Horizon Films
- Producer: Accessible Horizon Films

The songs have been written and composed by S. Ramanujam and S. Balaji.

All lyrics are written by S. Balaji and S. Ramanujam.

Track list
No.	Title	Lyrics	Singer(s)	Length
1.	"Ulagathiley"		S. Balaji	5:17
2.	"Ganamanatho"		Backiyaraj, Hemambiga	4:25
3.	"Panathamattum"		S. Balaji	6:13
4.	"Jenny’s Poem"	Dr. Prakash	Kousalya Jeganathan	1:49
5.	"Peiyappola"		S. Balaji	6:05
Total length:				23:49

== Critical reception ==
The film was officially selected at the International Film Festival of Kerala, Trivandrum in 2012 and at the Filmburo Baden-Wurttemberg's Stuttgart Indian Film Festival, Germany in 2013.

== Release ==
The film was released unconventionally on the internet on the YouTube Channel of Accessible Horizon Films on 1 May 2016. Before the release, the makers had one special public screening at the Alliance Francaise, Madras on 29 April 2016. The producer stated that for three years, the Accessible Horizon Films team had been trying to release their film conventionally in theaters in Tamil Nadu, searching for distributors and trying to find people who might take their film and release it in theaters. The difficulty of releasing a film conventionally without financial backing or influence is just unimaginable especially when the film doesn't conform to the norms or the 'formula'. They initially thought of going conventionally only to reach a wide audience, because the film is about money, which everyone can relate to.
