= Katha Solla Porom =

2016 Indian film by Kalyaan

- Theatrical release poster
- Directed by: Kalyaan
- Written by: Kalyaan
- Produced by: S Subaskaran
- Starring: Shibana; Raveena Daha; Aravind Raghunath; Arjun; Aadukalam Naren; Vijayalakshmi
- Cinematography: Jemin Jom Ayyaneth
- Edited by: Vijay Velukutty
- Music by: Pavan Kumar
- Production company: Relax Adds Production
- Release date: 20 May 2016
- Country: India
- Language: Tamil

Katha Solla Porom (transl. We are going to tell a story) is a 2016 Indian Tamil-language children's comedy film directed by Kalyaan in his directorial debut. The film stars child actors Shibana, Raveena Daha, Aravind Raghunath and Arjun in the lead roles with Aadukalam Naren and Vijayalakshmi in pivotal roles. It was released on 20 May 2016.

== Cast ==
- Shibana as Priya
- Raveena Daha as Anitha
- Aravind Raghunath as Arun
- Arjun as Arjun
- Aadukalam Naren as Anitha's father
- Vijayalakshmi as Anitha's mother
- Vishwanath as Aravind
- Akshara
- Anuradha
- Pasanga Sivakumar as Aravind's uncle
- Jeeva Ravi as Magician
- Kaali Venkat as Kaali
- Cheranraj as Police Inspector
- Supergood Subramani as Police Officer
- R. Dharshan as kidnapper

== Production ==
Kalyaan, who participated on the Naalaya Iyakunar TV show, made his directorial debut with this film.

== Soundtrack ==
- "Hey Gundaa" – Chorus
- "Mummy Daddy" – Chorus
- "Aararo" – Chinnaponnu, Chorus

== Release and reception ==
The film was released on 20 May 2016. Malini Mannath of The New Indian Express wrote that "Kadha Solla Porom has a feel-good flavour and positivity. And capsuled within just an hour and forty minutes, it makes for an ideal summer vacation experience, not just for kids but for adults too". On the contrary, The Times of India gave the film a rating of two out of five stars and stated that "If only had the director displayed the kind of focus that these scenes have, this could have become an emotionally moving film like Azhagu Kutti Chellam". The film was also reviewed by Samayam and Maalai Malar.
