= V. Sethuraman =

Indian dermatologist and actor (1984–2020)

- Born: 29 October 1984; Athangudi, Karaikudi, Tamil Nadu
- Died: 26 March 2020 (aged 35); Chennai, Tamil Nadu
- Other name: Sethu
- Occupations: Dermatologist; Actor
- Years active: 2013–2020
- Spouse: Umayal (m.2016)
- Children: 1

V. Sethuraman (29 October 1984 – 26 March 2020), also known by his stage name Sethu, was an Indian dermatologist, who was the founder and medical director of ZI Clinic, a dermatology clinic in Chennai, Tamil Nadu. He was also an actor who appeared in Tamil language films, first appearing in the comedy Kanna Laddu Thinna Aasaiya (2013).

== Career ==
=== Medicine ===
Sethuraman studied dermatology at Annamalai University, where he got his MBBS and MD. He then obtained his fellowship from the National Skin Centre in Singapore. In 2016, he launched a skin clinic called ZI Clinic with guests including actors Bobby Simha, Nithin Sathya, and Aravind Akash, music director Dharan Kumar, director Venkat Prabhu, and the spiritual Brahmakumari sisters were also present at the launching of the clinic, which opened its second location in Anna Nagar in Chennai on 15 October 2017.

=== Film ===
Sethu had been close friends with the actor Santhanam, who offered him the lead role in the movie, Kanna Laddu Thinna Aasaiya, which was a success. He subsequently agreed to act in Vaaliba Raja, which retained much of the cast from the previous film including Santhanam, Vishakha Singh, VTV Ganesh, Devadarshini, Pattimandram Raja, and Srinivasan. Sethu portrayed a supporting role in Sakka Podu Podu Raja, marking his third collaboration with Santhanam, VTV Ganesh, and Srinivasan. His next film was 50/50 starring Sruthi Ramakrishnan, Bala Saravanan, and news anchor Bavithra.

== Death ==
Sethu died on 26 March 2020 at 8:45 PM due to cardiac arrest.

== Filmography ==
- All films are in Tamil.

| Year | Title | Role | Notes |
|---|---|---|---|
| 2013 | Kanna Laddu Thinna Aasaiya | Shiva | |
| 2016 | Vaaliba Raja | Karthik | |
| 2017 | Sakka Podu Podu Raja | Saravana | |
| 2019 | 50/50 | Sethu | |
