= 50/50 (2019 film) =

2019 film by Krishna Sai

- Theatrical release poster
- Directed by: Krishna Sai
- Story by: Alexander
- Produced by: V.N. Ranjith Kumar
- Starring: Yogi Babu; Sethu; Shruthi Ramakrishnan; Bavithra; Shreya Gupta
- Cinematography: R K Prathap
- Edited by: Raja Sethupathi
- Music by: Dharan Kumar
- Distributed by: LIPI Cine Crafts
- Release date: 27 December 2019
- Running time: 114 minutes
- Country: India
- Language: Tamil

50/50 is a 2019 Indian Tamil-language horror comedy film directed by Krishna Sai, who previously directed the Kannada film Traya (2019). The film stars Yogi Babu, Sethu, Shruthi Ramakrishnan, Bavithra, and Shreya Gupta. This film marks Ramakrishna's return to Tamil cinema after a sabbatical and Bavithra's lead film debut. This was Sethu's final film as actor.

== Plot ==
Three brothers, who are gangsters, had a tough fight with the police. As the police couldn't oppose them, as they are powerful in their area, he had been searching for someone to help him take a dig at them. Meanwhile, the cop finds small time robbers and asks them to loot the gangsters. Finally, the robbers steal the money from the gangsters and enter a bungalow to escape from them. The gangsters chase them and enter the same bungalow. After getting in, they come to know it is a bhoot (haunted) bungalow. How they all come out from the bungalow, forms the rest of the story.

== Cast ==
- Yogi Babu as Kai Kulandhai
- Sethu as Sethu
- Shruthi Ramakrishnan as Madhu
- Bavithra as Samantha
- Shreya Gupta as Dhanalakshmi
- Bala Saravanan as Suman
- John Vijay as Kulandhai
- Rajendran as Pachai Kulandhai
- Dheena as Sethu's friend
- Nandha Saravanan as Police Inspector
- Rakul as Sethu's friend
- Sri Nikha as Andreah
- Mayilswamy as Nagaraj
- Madhan Bob
- Kathadi Ramamurthy as the Dhanalakshmi's grandfather
- Pattimandram Raja as Madhu's father
- Sriranjani as Madhu's mother
- Swaminathan as Lawyer
- Kavarimaan
- Preethiksha
- Kothandam as Kai Kulandhai's friend

== Production ==
The venture began production in 2016 with Sethu and Kannada actress Shruthi Ramakrishnan in the lead roles. Santhanam, a friend of Sethu who previously collaborated with him in Kanna Laddu Thinna Aasaiya (2013) and Vaaliba Raja (2016), denied a role in this film, because he was only signing films that featured himself in the lead role. Director Krishna Sai says the film is about three IT guys: Sethu, Bala Saravanan, and Dheena from Kalakka Povathu Yaaru?, who have lost their jobs and are involved in petty theft to have a decent life. The film was shot in Chennai and Pondicherry. Ramakrishanan played a college girl in the film. Bavithra, a model anchor, was roped in to play the role of Shruthi's younger sister. Nandha Saravanan played an inspector who use the three IT guys to take revenge on his own personal enemies, which will be played by Rajendran, John Vijay, and Yogi Babu. Swaminathan and Kothandam were cast in supporting roles.

In August 2019, the team restarted promotions and renamed the film from Aalukku Paathi 50/50 to Kadhal Modhal 50/50. The third heroine was revealed to be Mumbai-based model Shreya Gupta. Yogi Babu was promoted as the lead of the film due to his popularity. Upon release, the film's name was shortened to 50/50.

== Soundtrack ==
50/50 (Original Motion Picture Soundtrack)

Soundtrack album by Dharan Kumar
- Released: 2019
- Genre: Feature film soundtrack
- Language: Tamil
- Label: TrendMusic
- Producer: Dharan Kumar

Soundtrack was composed by Dharan Kumar. Yogi Babu was picturized in a song titled "Kolamavu Kokila", the name of the film in which he starred as the main lead.

- "Facebook La" - Nivas (lyrics by Krishna Sai, Chendrasekaran A)
- "Usaru Bathiri" - Anthony Daasan (lyrics by Ve. Madhan Kumar)
- "Aagasam" - Shweta Mohan, Deepak (lyrics by Mani Amudhan)
- "Bin Laden Ganguda" - John Vijay, Dr Narayanan (lyrics by Mani Amudhan)
- "Bin Laden" (Theme) - Arunraja Kamaraj (lyrics by Mani Amudhan)
- "Kolamav Kokkila" - Poovaiyar, MC D (lyrics by MC D)

== Release and reception ==
The film released on 27 December 2019 with Sillu Karupatti. Maalai Malar gave the film a negative review.
