= Valeba Raja =

2016 Indian film by Sai Gokul Ramanath

- Poster
- Directed by: Sai Gokul Ramanath
- Written by: Sai Gokul Ramanath; Ganesh Raj
- Produced by: H. Murali
- Starring: Sethu; Santhanam; Vishakha Singh; Nushrat Bharucha
- Cinematography: Loganathan Srinivasan
- Edited by: Sathyaraj Natarajan
- Music by: Radhan
- Production company: Vanks Vision
- Release date: 25 March 2016
- Country: India
- Language: Tamil

Valeba Raja (sometimes Vaaliba Raja) (transl. Young King/King of Youth) is a 2016 Indian Tamil-language romantic comedy It was directed by Sai Gokul Ramanath and produced by Murali. The film stars Sethu, Vishakha Singh and Nushrat Bharucha (in her Tamil debut), while Santhanam also essays a pivotal role. The film began production in June 2013 and was released on 25 March 2016 to negative reviews from critics and was a box office failure.

== Cast ==
- Sethu as Karthik
- Santhanam as Dr. Raja (Valeba Raja)
- Nushrat Bharucha as Sweety
- Vishakha Singh as Shaalu
- Jayaprakash as Ramachandran
- Sriranjani as Durga, Karthik's mother
- VTV Ganesh as Prabhakaran Sethji, Sweety's father
- Devadarshini as Devadarshini (Devi)
- Chitra Lakshmanan as Chitra Lakshmanan
- Neelima Rani as Chithra Kala
- Subbu Panchu as Pathmanaban (Pathu / Dulquer)
- Rajendran as Ragendra
- Meera Krishnan as Chithra Lakshmi
- Pandu as Traffic Police Officer
- Pattimandram Raja as Astrologer
- Baby Mithra as Mithra (Mithu)
- Jangiri Madhumitha as Raja's assistant
- Mahanadhi Shankar as Raja's interviewer
- Bonda Mani
- Agavamma
- Kanal Kannan as Romantic Kannan (guest appearance)
- Ashvin Raja in a guest appearance
- Srinivasan in a guest appearance

== Production ==
In June 2013, it was announced that several members from the cast of the successful 2013 comedy film, Kanna Laddu Thinna Aasaiya, would collaborate again for another comedy film to be directed by Sai Gokul Ramnath, who had previously made the unreleased horror film Shivani. Sethu was signed to play the lead role, with Vishakha Singh as the lead actress, while Santhanam also agreed to feature in the film as a psychiatrist. The film continued to shoot through 2013, with Hindi actress Nushrat Bharucha brought in during mid 2013 to portray another heroine in the film. The film was completed in early 2014, and the director revealed that the makers were targeting to release the film in May 2014, but the release was subsequently postponed.

== Soundtrack ==
Soundtrack was composed by Radhan. The team held an audio launch event in June 2014, with Kamal Haasan attending as the chief guest. In a music review, a critic from The Times of India rated the album 3 out of 5 stars and wrote, "The highlight is the pop flavour of the songs".

Valeba Raja

Soundtrack album by Radhan
- Released: 2014
- Recorded: 2014
- Genre: Feature film soundtrack
- Language: Tamil
- Label: Sony Music India
- Producer: Radhan

Radhan chronology
Andala Rakshasi (2012)	Valeba Raja (2014)	Yevade Subramanyam (2015)

- "Ennamo Pannura" - Rajan, Ramee
- "Oru Naal" - Bobo Shashi, Veena Ghantasala
- "Vaa Madhi" - Blaaze, Mukesh Mohamed
- "Nadukadula" - Gana Bala

== Release and reception ==
Despite being completed in early 2014, the producers were keen that the film was released at a suitable time and the film remained complete but unreleased till late 2015, evading several announced release dates and at last it was scheduled to release on 27 November 2015. After that the booking was open for the movie on 1 January 2016, got postponed again. The film was finally released on 25 March 2016, thus being in the making for three years. The Times of India gave the film a rating of two-and-a-half out of five stars and stated that "It sounds fairly engaging, but these scenes are neither comic or dramatic and remain flat". A critic from The Hindu stated that "There’s only one thing worse than an unfunny film. It’s an unfunny film that thinks it’s funny". Sify wrote that "Technically, the production value is below par and even the visual quality lacks the grandeur. Enough said, now you can decide whether to watch the movie or not".
