= House Full (2009 Kannada film) =

- VCD cover
- Directed by: Hemanth Hegde
- Produced by: Anuj Saxena
- Starring: Diganth; Hemanth Hegde; Girija Oak; Vishakha Singh
- Cinematography: Magi Natesh
- Edited by: H S Srikanth Thengina Thota
- Music by: Kiran
- Release date: 24 July 2009
- Country: India
- Language: Kannada

House Full is a 2009 Indian Kannada-language film directed by Hemanth Hegde, starring Diganth, Hemanth Hegde, Girija Oak, and Vishakha Singh in the lead roles.

The movie is an adaptation of the Marathi play Pati Sagle Uchapati, which itself was based on the English play Right Bed Wrong Husband. The English play was adapted into Tamil as Thikku Theriyatha Veettil which was made into the Tamil movie Veettuku Veedu (1970). Veettuku Veedu was earlier remade in Kannada as Galate Samsara (1977). The Marathi play went on to be adapted in Hindi in the same year later as All The Best: Fun Begins (2009) which was remade in Malayalam as Best of Luck (2010) which in turn was remade in Kannada as Ond Chance Kodi (2015).

== Cast ==
- Diganth as Digu
- Hemanth Hegde as Parameshi
- Girija Oak as Neethu
- Vishakha Singh as Ishu
- Loknath
- Milind Gunaji
- Bullet Prakash
- Ramesh Bhat
- Sangamesh Upase
- Srinivas Gowda

== Music ==
House Full

Soundtrack album by Kiran
- Released: 2009
- Recorded: 2009
- Genre: Feature film soundtrack
- Length: 22:08
- Language: Kannada

Official audio
- House Full - Full Album on YouTube

Track listing
No.	Title	Singer(s)	Length
1.	"Manadalli Mucchitta Preethi"	Karthik, Anuradha Bhat	4:43
2.	"Go Go Munde Hogu"	Vineeth Singh	3:54
3.	"Olavu Midida"	Rahul Vaidya	5:12
4.	"Rammu Brandi"	Krishna	4:55
5.	"Neeli Nayanadi"	Javed Ali, Anuradha Bhat	4:44
Total length:			22:08

== Reception ==
=== Critical response ===
R G Vijayasarathy of Rediff.com scored the film at 3 out of 5 stars and says "Diganth with his dimpled looks is much better than his comedy role in Masth Maja Maadi. Mumbai girls Vishaka Singh and Gowri are okay -- their confused expressions are effectively shown. It is veteran actor Uncle Lokanath who has really done a great job as Balawanta Rao. Kiran's music could have been better but the songs are well picturised. All in all, House Full is an enjoyable fare". A critic from The New Indian Express wrote "Meanwhile, Diganth’s grandfather comes to Bangalore. He mistakes Neethu as Ishwarya. He even arranges a honeymoon for them at Goa. But Ishwarya appears on the scene and wants to be with Diganth. The climax is how Parameshi and his wife Neethu come together again. It provides some entertainment, if that is all you are looking for". BS Srivani from Deccan Herald wrote "Girija impresses while Vishakha fails even to provide an eyeful. Bullet Prakash, Rekha, Milind Gunaji, Myna and Jhansi Subbaiah are wasted. Digant, however, is the actual heroine of the film, with his killing looks and penchant for falling into trouble just as easily as any newbie heroine is prone to do. His voice doesn’t help either". A critic from Bangalore Mirror wrote "Though the film is silly most of the time, it still manages to make you laugh. Girija Oak is the best among all the actors. Diganth is still to attend acting school, he better do it before his next assignment. The film is worth a travel to the cinema hall".
