= Antharathma =

- Directed by: B Shankar
- Written by: B Shankar
- Produced by: B Shankar
- Starring: Mithun Tejaswi; Vishakha Singh; Rohan Gowda
- Cinematography: Sundarnath Suvarna
- Edited by: Sri
- Music by: Giridhar Diwan
- Production company: Friends Productions
- Release date: 23 April 2010
- Country: India
- Language: Kannada

Antharathma is a 2010 Indian Kannada-language horror thriller film written, produced, and directed by B Shankar in his directorial debut and starring Mithun Tejaswi, Vishakha Singh and Rohan Gowda. The film is inspired by Ghost (1990).

== Cast ==
- Mithun Tejaswi as Shyam
- Vishakha Singh as Mahi
- Rohan Gowda as Rohan
- Umashree as Chowdamma
- Rangayana Raghu as a ghost
- Harish Raj
- Suman Ranganathan in an item song
- Diganth (guest appearance)
- Brahmavar
- Vaijanath Biradar
- Hanumanthe Gowda

== Production ==
Two songs were shot in Dubai. The makers of the film partnered with Pratham Motors, Sangeetha Mobiles, Konark Car Accessories and Cable Operators, who gifted their customers with audio CDs of Antharathma.

== Reception ==
A critic from The Times of India wrote, "Shankar has deviated from regular Sandalwood themes and takes on recreating a version of Hollywood's Ghost". A critic from Bangalore Mirror wrote, "This ghost, er, Antharathma is unlike any other atma (spirit) Kannada audience have seen before. For this and the fact that Shankar manages never to falter in the narrative makes this a very enjoyable watch". V. S. Rajapur of IANS rated the film two-and-half out of five stars and wrote, "Antharathma may not be as good as 'Ghost', but it still entertains with its spooky elements".
