= Nila (TV series) =

2019 Indian TV series

- Genre: Soap opera
- Written by: K.Anand Samyuktha (1-45); K.Sudhakar Samyuktha (46-288); R.Arvindraj (289-489)
- Directed by: Shiva.K; A.B.Nakeeran
- Creative directors: Sudhakar Pallamala; manjula Naidu
- Starring: Bavithra; Hemanth; Sharmitha Gowda
- Theme music composer: Ganesh Raghavendra
- Opening theme: "Paru Para Para Paravaiye En Siragai Vaangi Kondu"; Rita Thyagarajan (singer); Mano Pazhanisamy (lyrics)
- Country of origin: India
- Original language: Tamil
- No. of seasons: 1
- No. of episodes: 489

Production
- Executive producer: Nithyanantham
- Producers: sudhakar pallamala, Srikanth Entertainment
- Cinematography: Neelamegam
- Editor: vasister
- Camera setup: Multi-camera
- Running time: 20–22 minutes
- Production companies: Srikanth Entertainment Pvt Ltd; Sun Entertainment

Original release
- Network: Sun TV
- Release: 18 March 2019 – 24 April 2021

Nila is a 2019-2021 Indian Tamil-language television drama, which premiered on Sun TV on 18 March 2019 and ended on 24 April 2021. The 489-episode show starred Bavithra and Hemanth. It was produced by Srikanth Entertainment Pvt Ltd. The series aired Monday to Saturday on Sun TV. It was an official remake of the Telugu serial Anandaragam.

== Plot ==
Nila and Karthik love each other deeply and share an aspiration to pursue their education abroad. But Kousalya, Nila's mother, plots along with her brother Narayanan and with Neelambari, a vicious rich woman, against Nila's dream and love. The storyline turned on the mystery behind Kousalya's step-motherly behavior towards Nila, and whether Karthik and Nila's father Rajasekhar would survive Neelambari's treachery and help Nila realize her ambition.

== Cast ==
=== Main ===
- VJ Bavithra in dual role as Nila Karthick and Madhi
- Rajeev Ravichandran (1-299) and Hemanth Kumar(300-489) as Karthick (Nila's husband)
- Sharmitha Gowda / Vandana Micheal as Neelambari/Bhavani Karthick's biological mother, Sanjay's adoptive mother, Ashok's sister (Episode 1-412)
  - Sharmitha Gowda replaced Vandana as Neelambari (Episode 413-489)

=== Supporting ===
- S.Kavitha as Revathy/Sujatha (Nila's biological mother)
- Sridhar and Vineeth Kumar as Ashok (Neelambari and Venmathi's brother/ Anjali's husband)
- Manju Paritala as Priya (Nila's Best Friend)
- Dheepthi Kapil as Surya, Kathir's friend
- Vetrivelan as Kathirvelan, a Police officer
- Carolina and Srilatha as Surya's mom.
- Murali Kumar as Kulasekaran (Karthick's father)
- Sridevi Ashok as Venmathi (Neelambari's sister, Karthick's aunt)
- Sadhana and Jeevitha as Kousalya Rajashekar (Nila's aunt, Swetha's mother)
- Syamantha Kiran as Anjali Ashok (Ashok's 1st wife)
- Jeeva Ravi as Rajashekar (Nila's uncle, Sujatha's brother, Swetha's father)
- Vasanth Gopinath as Narayanan (Kousalya's brother, Nila's adoptive uncle, Swetha's uncle)
- VJ Sam as Sanjay (Neelambari's adopted son)
- Seenu as Shridhar/Anwar, Nila's biological father
- Fouziee as Fatimah (Shridhar's adoptive daughter)
- Rahul as Rahim
- Reshmi and Rhema Ashok as Swetha (Nila's cousin)
- Raj Mithran
- R. Aravindraj as Guruji

=== Cameo appearances ===
- Shwetha Bandekar as Chandra
