= Balloon light =

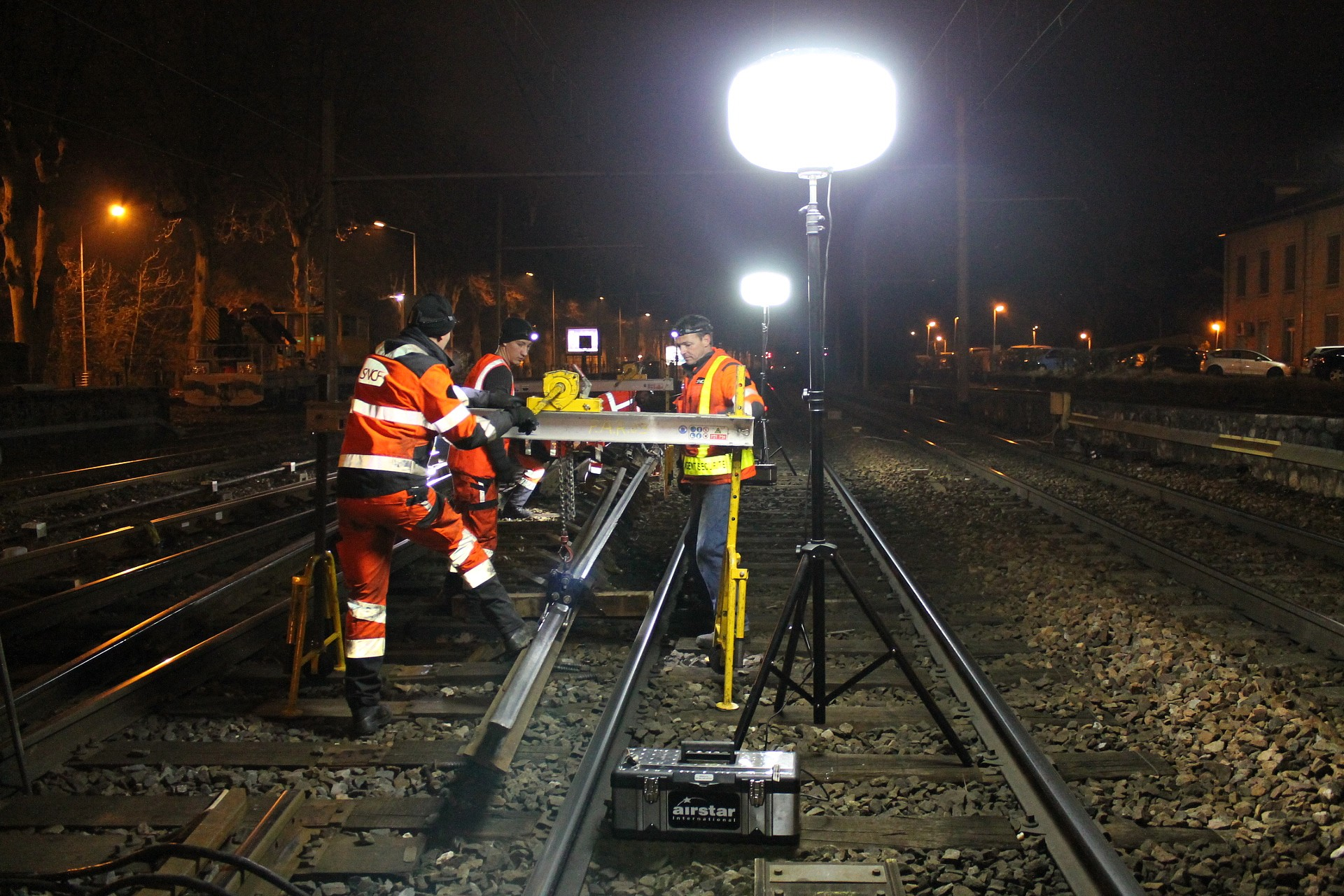
Maintenance SNCF. Professional lighting by Airstar. 2015.

Balloon lights (also called lighting balloons) are a specialized type of luminaire used primarily for lighting in the motion picture industry, night highway construction, incident management, and public security applications such as police checkpoints. These luminaires typically consist of one or more high-intensity lamps surrounded by a translucent fabric balloon. The balloon acts as a diffuser to soften and disperse the light. The upper portion of the balloon sometimes has a reflective inner coating to direct more of the light downward. Some commercial products use a blower to expand the balloon, while others have an umbrella-like internal wire frame. The device is essentially an industrial version of a Japanese paper lantern.

The lighting balloon was first patented in Germany on October 26, 1924 (patent #427894). Until the 1990s, several patents were issued, although the application was utilized very little in Western countries. The lighting balloon industry has been greatly modernized by the company Airstar.

== History ==
In 1994, Pierre Chabert and Benoit Beylier, founder of Airstar, a French company based in Grenoble (Isère), created a balloon light, a self-supporting spacelight suspended in a helium-inflated balloon. It is ideal for interiors or exteriors where rigging is a problem. One of the first movies ever lit with this kind of system, was Mission: Impossible , directed by Brian De Palma, Director of Photography - Stephen H. Burum, Gaffer - Laurie Shane. It was developed for the ‘embassy’ interior, which was shot at Národní Muzeum, Natural History Museum, Václavské námestí 68 in Prague. Then one of the next big movies was Titanic, directed by James Cameron. Later they were used in the Opening Ceremony of the 2000 Summer Olympics in Sydney, the lighting set for Pirates of the Caribbean, Rang De Basanti, Sivaji, Avatar, Singapore Grand Prix and the Vancouver Olympics.

== Balloon shapes ==
- Spherical and near-spherical is the most common variety. The shape of the units demonstrate wind resistance
- Cubic - cuboid balloons with rigging points at the corners, "Diamond series by Airstar", "Ceilair by Airstar", useful for cutting the light with reflector panels.
- Tube - cylindrical shape, with a more "directed" light. Airstar.
- Cloud - Grip balloon, low profile tuboid. Intended to semi-block the sun. Used by grips.
- Blimp - Elongated shape provides a more steady platform for lighting. Arizona Balloons.

== Alternative lighting sources ==
Light types

- Tungsten
- HMI
- Metal halide
- Mercury vapor
- Sodium vapor
- Light Emitting Diodes
