= Kida Poosari Magudi =

2016 Indian film by J.Jayakumar

- Theatrical release poster
- Directed by: J.Jayakumar
- Produced by: T.Thamizhmani
- Starring: Ramdev; Thamizh; Nakshatra; Srinivasan
- Cinematography: Ravi Seenivas
- Edited by: Muthu Muniyaswamy
- Music by: Ilaiyaraaja
- Release date: 8 April 2016
- Running time: 137 minutes
- Country: India
- Language: Tamil

Kida Poosari Magudi is a 2016 Indian Tamil-language film directed by J.Jayakumar. The film stars Ramdev, Thamizh and Nakshatra in lead roles with actor Powerstar Srinivasan in a comic role. The film was shot at Thittakudi, Pennadam, Marungur Kuvagam and Thamarai Poondi.

== Plot ==
Kida Poosari Magudi is the tale of love that happens after marriage.

== Cast ==
- Ramdev as Selvam
- Thamizh as Magudi
- Nakshatra as Malar
- Srinivasan
- Singampuli
- Kalairani
- Mu Ramaswamy as Thatha

== Soundtrack ==
Music composed by Ilayaraja, lyrics written by Mu. Metha.

Track listing
No.	Title	Singer(s)	Length
1.	"Chinna Paya Vayasu"	Surmukhi Raman, Prasanna	04:52
2.	"Manikkuyilu Satham"	Ilaiyaraaja, Manjari	04:41
3.	"Muthu Muthu"	Suraj Jagan, Prasanna, Chorus	05:23
4.	"Nee Aatukkuty Naan"	Rita, Priyadarshini	04:42
5.	"Oru Kaala Thula"	Sharreth	04:57

== Reception ==
Malani Mannath of The New Indian Express mentioned that the film springs a surprise for its fairly neat screenplay and treatment, supported by good performances and a well thought-out climax.
