= Pattimandram Raja =

Indian actor

- Born: Simson Raja Jeyaraj; Madurai, Tamil Nadu, India
- Citizenship: Indian
- Education: The American College, Madurai
- Occupations: Banker, Actor, debate speaker
- Television: Vaanga Pesalam

YouTube information
- Channel: Pattimandram Raja

Simson Raja, popularly known as Pattimandram Raja, is an Indian television personality popular for his speeches in Tamil-language talk shows (Pattimandram). His speeches in the debate talk shows, moderated by Solomon Pappaiah, made him famous among the Tamil households around the world. He used to anchor a daily talk show called Vaanga Pesalaam broadcast in Sun TV.

== Career ==
'Pattimandram' Raja' was born in a village called Keezhamathur near Madurai. His parents were teachers in a school in the village. He completed his school studies from St. Britto Higher school in Madurai. After pursuing B.com., degree from American College, Madurai, Raja studied M.A.,(Journalism and Mass communications) in Madurai Kamaraj University. He worked for United Bank of India from 1984 to 2019.

Raja has travelled with Solomon Pappaiah to many countries and became popular as a debate speaker. He rose to fame by his witty, intelligent and humorous speeches throwing light of information on various areas in the famous Pattimandram show telecasts during festival times on Sun TV. He also gave valuable current affair information through the talk shows like Vaanga Pesalam aired in Sun TV. Raja has staged more than 4,000+ shows across the world including United States, United Kingdom, France, Australia, Japan, Middle East, Seychelles, South Africa, Singapore, Southeast Asia, Sri Lanka. He performed in a few well-known Tamil films, including Sivaji (2007), Guru En Aalu (2009) and Idharkuthane Aasaipattai Balakumara (2013).

== Filmography ==
- Sivaji: The Boss (2007)
- Guru En Aalu (2009)
- Guru Sishyan (2010)
- Mappillai (2011)
- Ko (2011)
- Ooh La La La (2012)
- Mayilu (2012)
- Kanna Laddu Thinna Aasaiya (2013)
- Pattathu Yaanai (2013)
- Idharkuthane Aasaipattai Balakumara (2013; uncredited)
- Vathikuchi (2013)
- Nannbenda (2015)
- Vasuvum Saravananum Onna Padichavanga (2015)
- Soan Papdi (2015)
- Bangalore Naatkal (2016)
- Vaaliba Raja (2016)
- Thodari (2016)
- Kaashmora (2016)
- Azhahendra Sollukku Amudha (2016)
- Tea Kadai Bench (2018)
- 50/50 (2019)
- Viruman (2022)
- PT Sir (2023)
- Vaagai (2024)
