= Humsey Hai Jahaan =

Hum Sey Hai Jahaan
- Directed by: Mashhoor Amrohi
- Written by: Mashhoor Amrohi
- Produced by: Tajdar Amrohi
- Starring: Mashhoor Amrohi; Vishakha Singh; Jackie Shroff
- Cinematography: Aamir Lal
- Music by: Suhas; Abuzar Rizvi
- Release date: 6 June 2008 (India)
- Country: India
- Language: Hindi

Hum Sey Hai Jahaan is a 2008 Indian Hindi-language romantic comedy film directed by Mashhoor Amrohi, who co-stars in the film alongside Vishakha Singh (in her Bollywood debut) and Jackie Shroff. The film was released to negative reviews and was a box office failure.

== Cast ==
- Mashhoor Amrohi as Sameer Khanna
- Vishakha Singh as Esha Singh
- Jackie Shroff as Gary Rosario
- Kiran Kumar as Pran Panwara
- A K Hangal as Mr. Wild West
- Mukesh Rishi as Dabar
- Shehzad Khan as Gyaneshwar Singh
- Prem Chopra
- Govinda (Special appearance)

== Production ==
The film was initially titled Hum Laakh Chhupayein Pyaar in 2006. Mashoor Kamal Amrohi, the grandson of filmmaker and writer Kamal Amrohi debuted as an actor, director and scriptwriter of the film while the shooting of the film took place at Singapore.

== Music ==
The music of the film is composed by Suhas, Siddharth and Abuzar while lyrics are written by Kumaar.

=== Soundtrack ===
#	Title	Singer(s)
1.	"Hum Sey"	Suraj
2.	"Baaton Mein"	Shaan, Sunidhi Chauhan
3.	"Marhaba"	Adnan Sami
4.	"Hum Lakh Chhupayein"	Kumar Sanu, Sunidhi Chauhan
5.	"Tu Andhere Mein"	Shaan
6.	"Hum Sey (Remix)"	Suraj

== Reception ==
Nitya Ramani of Rediff.com rated the film 1/5 stars and wrote, "All in all a film not worth watching".
