= Lathika (film) =

- Directed by: Srinivasan
- Written by: R. Bharathan
- Produced by: Srinivasan
- Starring: Srinivasan; Meenakshi Kailash; Rahman
- Cinematography: P. G. Vetrivel
- Edited by: V. R. Hari Pazhani
- Music by: R. Bharathan
- Production company: Sri Lathika Films
- Release date: 18 March 2011
- Running time: 123 minutes
- Country: India
- Language: Tamil

Lathika is a 2011 Indian Tamil-language action comedy film directed by Srinivasan, starring himself and Meenakshi Kailash in the lead roles, alongside Rahman in a pivotal role. The film marked the lead film debut of Srinivasan, who also produced the film.

== Cast ==
- Srinivasan as Eashwar
- Meenakshi Kailash
- Rahman as Antony
- Shanmuga Sundaram
- Pooja
- Sahan Fathima
- Avanthi
- N. Ramanathan
- Baby Lathika as Lathika

== Production ==
Dr. Srinivasan began production on a film starring himself in the lead role. He named the film Lathika after his daughter.

== Reception ==
A critic from Dinamalar wrote that Ra. Bharathan could have put more focus into the story, screenplay, dialogues, songs and music.

== Controversy ==
Through his financial company, Baba Trading Company, Srinivasan obtained Rs. 7 crore rupees from unsuspecting businessmen and used the money to begin a career in films through this film.

Srinivasan reportedly hired force fans to attend the movie at a single cinema in North Chennai for publicity sake. The film ran for 100 days at a single theatre.
