= Neethana Avan =

- Poster
- Directed by: Punch Bharath
- Written by: Punch Bharath
- Produced by: P. Ranganayaki
- Starring: Sadhan; Sriman; Srinivasan; Aishwarya Rajesh; Jayashree
- Cinematography: Ravi Sundaram
- Edited by: Peter Babiya
- Music by: V. Thashi
- Production company: Vetrivel Creations
- Release date: 29 October 2010
- Running time: 125 minutes
- Country: India
- Language: Tamil

Neethana Avan (transl. You are him?) is a 2010 Indian Tamil language action comedy film directed by Punch Bharath. The film stars Sadhan, Sriman, Srinivasan, Aishwarya Rajesh and Jayashree, with Vaiyapuri, Singamuthu, Kadhal Dhandapani, Bala Singh, Kadhal Sukumar, Yuvarani, Sabitha Anand and C. Saipriya playing supporting roles. The film, produced by P. Ranganayaki, had musical score by V. Thashi and was released on 29 October 2010. This film marks the lead debut of Rajesh and the film debut of Srinivasan.

== Plot ==
Sathya is a fearful college student from a middle-class family. His relative Pooja and his collegemate Nandhini, the daughter of Vallal Perumal, are in love with Sathya, but they could not reveal their love to him. Vallal Perumal is an influential and respected man. During the day, he helps the poor, but during the night, he is revealed to be a perverted rapist who hasn't been caught.

The police inspector Thamizhselvan, who is transferred to his area, starts investigating these crimes. One day, Sathya is mistaken for having killed Pandian, the brother of the gangster Aadhi, and Thamizhselvan arrests the innocent Sathya. A vengeful Aadhi then murders Sathya's mother and sister. Thereafter, a fearless Sathya joins Vallal Perumal. Aadhi wants to win the local election, so he asks Vallal Perumal for his support, but the latter declines. In the meantime, Thamizhselvan finds out that the rapist is none other than Vallal Perumal. One night, Thamizhselvan, Vallal Perumal, Aadhi, and Sathya have a violent fight. During the fight, Sathya stabs Aadhi to death, while Vallal Perumal is killed by one of his victims. The film ends with Sathya being released from jail and returning to his lover Nandhini.

== Cast ==
- Sadhan as Sathya
- Sriman as Inspector Thamizhselvan
- Srinivasan as Vallal Perumal
- Aishwarya as Nandhini
- Jayashree as Pooja
- Vaiyapuri as Venus
- Singamuthu as Gurukkal
- Kadhal Dhandapani as Aadhi
- Bala Singh as Vasudevan
- Kadhal Sukumar as Manmadhan
- Yuvarani as Vallal's wife
- Sabitha Anand as Meenakshi
- C. Saipriya as Priya
- Lollu Sabha Seshu
- Kottachi as Gurukkal's assistant
- Sindhu
- Jessy as Latha
- Madhu in a special appearance
- Punch Bharath

== Production ==
Baba Cine Combines had launched their new film titled Suranga Paadhai on 26 November 2009 in Chennai. The same team of Anandha Thollai (unreleased) and Indrasena (2010), which was almost complete had teamed up for the second time. The film title was then changed as Neethana Avan under the banner of Vetrivel Creations. V. Thashi who won the Kerala State Film Award for Best Background Music in 2006 composed the music for this film. After working as an anchor for Asathupovathu Yaaru and participating in the dance show Maanada Mayilada, Aishwarya Rajesh signed to play the heroine role. Rajesh played the girl next door in the film. Srinivasan, a medical practitioner, was cast to play the villain role. Srinivasan was credited with the moniker "Powerstar".

== Soundtrack ==
The film score and the soundtrack were composed by V. Thashi. The soundtrack, released in 2010, features 4 tracks with lyrics written by Vijayakrishnan, Makkal Dasan, Mukhil and Padmavathi.

Tracklist
No.	Title	Lyrics	Singer(s)	Length
1.	"Thaniyaga Thendral"	Vijayakrishnan	Ajay Satyan, Vinitha	4:29
2.	"Anbum Aranum"	Makkaldhasan	Umapathi Dasan, Prabhakar, Sahana	3:05
3.	"Muthu Muthirai"	Mukhil	Ravidasan, Ruba	3:04
4.	"Thavaniponnu"	Padmavathi	Raadhika, Ajay Satyan	3:20
Total length:				13:58
