= Bavithra =

Indian model and actress

- Born: 23 March 1991 (age 34); Chennai, Tamil Nadu, India
- Other names: VJ Bavithra
- Occupations: Actress; Anchor; Model

Bavithra, also known as VJ Bavithra, is an Indian actress, anchor and model known for her works in Tamil films and television. She is best known for portraying the lead role in Nila. Bavithra is the only Tamil woman to have ever won the Miss South India beauty pageant.

== Career ==
Bavithra is an MBA graduate and worked for a corporate company for three years before embarking onto her passion in modelling and anchoring. In 2016, she debuted as one of the lead actresses with 50/50 pairing with V. Sethuraman. She became a household face while hosting Vanakkam Tamizha, a live breakfast television show before she landed the lead role in Nila in 2019 which went on to air for more than 500 episodes. She has also appeared in the streaming series Nila Nila Odi Vaa. she is currently appearingin Singapennae.

== Filmography ==
Films

Year	Film	Role	Notes	Ref(s)
2018	Sarkar		Uncredited role	
2019	50/50	Samantha	Debut as lead	

Television

Year	Name	Role	Channel	Notes	Ref(s)
2014	Natchathira Kabadi	Host	Sun TV		
2016	Soppana Sundari	Contestant	Sun Life		
2016	Thamarai	Poovarasi	Sun TV		
2017	Virundhinar Pakkam	Host	Sun TV		
2017	Suriya Vanakkam	Host	Sun TV		
2018	Vanakkam Tamizha	Host	Sun TV		
2018-2022	Naam Iruvar Namakku Iruvar	Thamarai	Star Vijay	Parallel protagonist	
2018	Nila Nila Odi Vaa	Yamuna	Viu	Web series	
2019-2021	Nila	Nila and Mathi	Sun TV	Lead role; Dual role	
2020	Pandavar Illam maha sangamam	Nila	Sun TV	Cameo Appearance	
2021-2022	Vaidhegi Kaathirundhaal	Aarthi	Star Vijay		
2023-present	Singapennae	Mithra	Sun TV		
2026-present	Lakshmi	Mahalakshmi	Sun TV		

== Awards ==
Year	Award	Result	Ref.
2017	Miss South India	Won	
