= Singapennae =

Indian television series

- Genre: Drama
- Written by: Prabhas Muthaiya Dialogues: Pon Ilango; Anandh Venu
- Screenplay by: Prabhas Muthaiya
- Directed by: Dhanush Krishna
- Starring: Maneesha Mahesh; Darshak Gowda; Amal Jith
- Theme music composer: Vikram Selva
- Opening theme: "Singapennae Vaa"; Saindhavi (vocals); Palani Bharathi (lyrics)
- Country of origin: India
- Original language: Tamil
- No. of seasons: 1
- No. of episodes: 900+

Production
- Producer: Balasubramaniam
- Cinematography: Ramesh Kesavan
- Editor: Seviloraja
- Camera setup: Multi-camera
- Running time: Approx.20–22 minutes per episode
- Production companies: Sun Entertainment; Miracle Media

Original release
- Network: Sun TV
- Release: 9 October 2023 – present

Singapennae (transl. The Woman Brave as a Lion) is an Indian Tamil television drama, Maneesha Mahesh, Darshak Gowda and Amalijith in lead roles.It was directed by Dhanush Krishna.The series premiered on 9 October 2023 on Sun TV from Monday to Saturday. It is also available on the digital platform Sun NXT. This series became one of the most watched television shows in Tamil Nadu.

== Plot ==
Anandi, a simple yet bold girl, resided with her parents: Azhagappan , Pechiyamma brother: Velu, and sister: Kokila in the village of Sevarakottai. Their peaceful existence was overshadowed by Suyambulingam, also known as Suyambu, a ruthless loan shark who preyed on the villagers, offering loans against their properties. Tragedy struck when Anandi's brother: Velu eloped with his girlfriend, taking away the money intended for their elder ji wedding, effectively stopping it. When Anandi's father: Azhagappan fell into debt and was unable to repay Suyambu, the loan shark made a cruel demand: Anandi's hand in marriage in exchange for her father's freedom. Reluctantly, Anandi agreed to this sacrifice, but the marriage was eventually halted.

Fate intervened when Mahesh arrived in Sevarakottai with his parents and his friend Mithra to perform a marriage ritual at the local temple. Mahesh was instantly captivated by Anandi. Mithra, who harbored a secret love for Mahesh, grew to resent Anandi, especially as Mahesh openly supported her and Anandi helped them complete their ritual.

Later, Anandi moved to Chennai in search of employment to repay her father's debt. Her initial encounter with Anbu led to a misunderstanding, as she mistakenly believed him to be someone who cheated girls. Eventually, Anandi secured a job at Mahesh Garments, unaware that Mahesh was the owner. There, she frequently clashed with Anbu, who also worked at the company.

Anandi soon stumbled upon a clandestine drug operation within the garment factory. Aravind, Mahesh's best friend, was secretly running this illegal business with his elder brother, Thirumoorthy. When Anandi and her friends discovered their illicit activities, Thirumoorthy attempted to eliminate them. Unbeknownst to everyone, Aravind was equally involved. Mahesh, learning of the danger Anandi was in, came to her rescue. This incident prompted him to take on the role of managing director at the company, a move that surprised his parents, as he had always shown disinterest in business, preferring foreign travels.

Mithra, realizing the depth of Mahesh's affection for Anandi, consistently insulted and created problems for her. However, Mahesh and Anbu always came to Anandi's aid. In a dramatic turn of events, Mahesh was involved in an accident while saving Anandi, and her subsequent care for him only intensified his love for her.

Meanwhile, Anandi harbored a dislike for Anbu. Anbu sneak into anandhi room in women hostel where anandhi staying and learn her like and problem when she shared with her roommates and through this he send anonymous gifts and letters, signing them "Azhagan," which gradually made Anandi fall in love with this unseen admirer.

During the company's silver jubilee celebration, Mithra orchestrated a plan to defame both Anandi and Aravind, hoping to turn Mahesh against Anandi and break off her supposed engagement with Aravind. However, her scheme backfired. Anandi and Mahesh unknowingly consumed drugged juice and fell unconscious in the same room. Mithra then moved the unconscious Anandi outside. When Anandi regained consciousness in the garden, she returned to the hostel, experiencing severe body pain. Mahesh, unaware of these events, returned home. The following day, Anandi collapsed during an argument with Anbu, who revealed that someone had tried to kill her. Mahesh rushed her to the hospital.

== Cast ==
=== Main ===
- Maneesha Mahesh as Anandhi Anbarasan : Anbu’s wife, Azhagappan and Pechiamma youngest daughter;Kokila and Velu's sister(2023–present)
- Darshak Gowda as Mahesh: Thillairajan and Parvathi's foster son; Manonmani's biological son(2023–present)
- Amaljith as Anbarasan 'Anbu': Anandhi's husband, Lalitha's son, Yazhini's brother (2023–present)

=== Recurring ===
- Bavithra as Mithra: Main Antagonist, Anandhi's boss and CEO of Thillairajan's garment factory; daughter of Advocate Sathyavathi (2023–present)
- Poojitha Bobegowda as Thulasi: Antagonist, Anbu's ex-fiancée (2025–present)
- Indhumathi Manikandan as Manonmani: Mahesh's biological mother (2023–present)
- Rohith Ved as Thillairajan: Mahesh's foster father. (2023–present)
- Deepa Nethran as Parvathi: Mahesh's foster mother. (2023–present)
- Aarthi Ramkumar as Advocate Sathyavathi: Mithra's mother (2023–present)
- Anju as Lalitha: Anbu and Yazhini's mother (2023–present)
- Nivetha Ravi / Sinthujaa Jatheshwaran as Kokila Saravanan: Anandhi and Velu's elder sister. (2023–2025) / (2025–present)
- Ravi Prakash as Saravanan: Kokila's husband (2025–present)
- G. Gnanasambandan as Azhagappan: Kokila, Velu and Anandhi's father. (2023–present)
- Rama as Pechiyamma: Kokila, Velu and Anandhi's mother. (2023–present)
- Divya Vijaykumar / Sathya as Yazhini: Anbu's sister (2023–2026) / (2026–present)

=== Other Cast ===
- Srikanth Pakkiriswamy (Chandrakanth) as Karunakaran: Antagonist (2023–present)
- Arunkumar Padmanabhan as Aravind: Antagonist, Mahesh's arch-rival (2023–present)
- Unknown as Thirumoorthy: Antagonist, Aravind's brother (2023–present)
- Paramesh Babu as Muthu: Anbu's best friend, Jeyanthi's husband (2023–present)
- Dharani Hephziba / VJ Mohana as Jayanthi Muthu: Muthu's wife (2023–2025) / (2025–present)
- VJ Soundharya as Soundharya aka Sow Sow: Anandhi's best friend (2023–present)
- Karthik Sriram as Velu: Anandhi's elder brother. (2023–present)
- Madhan as Vinai: Yazhini's love interest (2026–present)
- Lakshmi Raj as Suyambulingam "Suyambu": Antagonist (2023–present)
- Unknown as Chokkalingam: Thulasi's father (2025–present)
- Baby Joyce as Bhavani: Thulasi's mother (2025–present)
- Geetha Narayanan as Pushpa: Karunakaran's wife (2024–present)
- Bhargavi Eshwaramoorthy as Rithika: Antagonist, Mithra's best friend. (2023–present)
- Dayana Inassi Muthu as Diana: Antagonist, Mithra's best friend (2023–present)
- Lokesh Baskaran as Maya: Antagonist, Aravind's friend (2024–present)
- Sasindhar Puspalingam as Paraman (2023)
- Rekha Angelina as Manimegalai (2023)
- 'Baby' Keerthana as Chittu (2023)
- 'Master' Atharsh Anandh as Suruli (2023)
- 'Master' Vimalraj as Pandi (2023)
- Gracy Thangavel as Kanmani, Suyambu's sister (2023)
- Jeevitha Murugesh / VJ Kalyani as Regina: Anandhi's hostel friend and room mate (2023–2024) / (2024–2025)
- Yogalakshmi as Gayathri: Anandhi's hostel friend and room mate (2023–2025)
- Hansita Vijayan as Salma: Anandhi's hostel friend and room mate (2023–2025)

=== Special Appearance ===
- Moondru Mudichu family members in Mahasangamam and Megasangamam (2026)
- Marumagal family members in Megasangamam (2026)

== Production ==
=== Development ===
On July end 2023, Sun TV confirmed that it would distribute the new Tamil serial, to be produced by Miracle Media. The series shoot began in August 2023 and the first promo was released on 18 September 2023. The show is directed by Dhanush Krishna.

=== Casting ===
Newcomer actress Maneesha Mahesh was cast as the female lead Anandhi,alongside Darshak Gowda was the cast as Main male lead Mahesh marking his return after 'Arundati'

In October 2023, Amaljith was casting as Anbu marking his return after 'Amman'.VJ Bavithra was cast as Mithira (Main Antogonist).

=== Release ===
The first promo was released on 18 September 2023 featuring Maneesha Mahesh and Rama. The second promo was unveiled on 30 September 2023, and the third promo was unveiled on 2 October 2023, featuring Maneesha Mahesh tell the story and revealing the release date.

The show started airing on Sun TV on 9 October 2023, replacing Vanathai Pola. This series was launched along with Zee Tamil's series Nala Damayanthi and Sandhya Raagam.

== Reception ==
=== Trp Ratings ===
Singapennae became one of the most watched Tamil television programs in 2023.The show got a TVR of 10.28 on launching week on 9 October 2023. On its launch week it became the Top 5 serial of Sun TV.

In January 2024, the series was the first most watched Tamil-language television series with 11.88 TVR

== Adaptations ==
Language	Title	Original release	Network(s)	Last aired	Lead Roles	Notes	Ref.
Tamil	Singapennae சிங்கப்பெண்ணே	9 October 2023	Sun TV	Ongoing	Maneesha Amaljith	Original	
Marathi	Navi Janmen Mi नवी जन्मेन मी	6 November 2023	Sun Marathi	10 September 2025		Remake	
Bengali	Badal Shesher Pakhi বাদল সেশের পাখি	13 November 2023	Sun Bangla	30 June 2024		Remake	
Kannada	Mynaa ಮೈನಾ	19 February 2024	Udaya TV	Ongoing	Bhavya Sidharth	Remake	
Telugu	Sivangi సివంగి	25 March 2024	Gemini TV	13 June 2026	Prathima	Remake	
Malayalam	Chattambipaaru ചട്ടമ്പിപ്പാറു	7 April 2025	Surya TV	Ongoing	Harisankar Kubra	Remake	
Hindi	Sangharsh Anandi Ka संघर्ष आनंदी का	10 May 2025	Sun Neo	5 July 2025		Dubbed	
