= Sivaji: The Boss =

2007 Indian film by Shankar

- Theatrical release poster
- Directed by: Shankar
- Screenplay by: Shankar
- Dialogues by: Sujatha
- Story by: Shankar
- Produced by: M. S. Guhan; M. Saravanan
- Starring: Rajinikanth; Shriya Saran; Vivek; Suman
- Cinematography: K. V. Anand
- Edited by: Anthony
- Music by: A. R. Rahman
- Production company: AVM Productions
- Distributed by: AVM Productions
- Release dates: 14 June 2007 (premiere); 15 June 2007 (India)
- Running time: 188 minutes
- Country: India
- Language: Tamil
- Budget: ₹60 crore (Note: The Economic Times claims the budget to be 600 million. The Telegraph estimated it to be 80 crore, while India Today claimed it to be 890 million.)
- Box office: ₹150 crore

Sivaji: The Boss is a 2007 Indian Tamil-language vigilante action film directed by Shankar and produced by AVM Productions. The film stars Rajinikanth, Shriya Saran, Vivek, and Suman. In the film, a software systems architect seeks to provide free medical treatment and education but faces hurdles from the political system and an influential minister.

A. R. Rahman composed the music in his 100th milestone composition, while the art direction, cinematography and editing were handled by Thota Tharani, K. V. Anand and Anthony respectively. With a budget of ₹600 million (US$6.4 million), the film was the most expensive Indian film at the time of its release. Rajinikanth became the highest-paid Indian actor with this film, earning a fee of around ₹260 million (US$2.8 million). Pre-production work for Sivaji began in August 2005 and Principal photography of the film commenced in November 2005 and lasted till February 2007. Filming took place in various locations, including Hyderabad, Spain, Italy, New York City, Pune and Chennai. It became the first Indian film to use Dolby Atmos surround sound technology.

Released on 15 June 2007, Sivaji received positive reviews from critics and became a commercial success by grossing ₹125-160 crore worldwide. It emerged as one of the highest-grossing Indian films at its release. The film won a National Film Award, three Filmfare Awards and two Vijay Awards. The film was converted into 3D and released on 12 December 2012 as Sivaji 3D. The runtime of the 3D version was shorter than the original, cut to 155 minutes. It also the first Tamil film to enter the 100 crore club.

== Plot ==
Sivaji Arumugam, a highly successful Indian systems architect, returns to his homeland after a lucrative career in the United States. Driven by philanthropy, he plans to invest his life savings into the Sivaji Foundation, a massive non-profit trust designed to establish a network of state-of-the-art universities and hospitals that serve the impoverished free of charge. His noble ambitions immediately draw the ire of Adiseshan, a ruthless and influential minister who operates a monopolistic business empire of profit-driven educational and medical institutions. Viewing the foundation as a catastrophic threat to his commercial interests, Adiseshan orchestrates bureaucratic roadblocks.

To secure basic permits and licenses, Sivaji is systematically extorted by a deeply entrenched network of corrupt government officials. Refusing to let his vision die, he exhaustively liquidates his international assets and mortgages his remaining property to meet the relentless bribery demands. Amidst this turmoil, Sivaji falls in love with and begins stalking Tamizhselvi, a demure saleswoman at a music shop. While her traditional family initially hesitates, Sivaji wins her over after a long period of pursuing her. However, a family astrologer warns that their union will bring absolute financial ruin and culminate in Sivaji's premature death. Terrified for his safety, Tamizhselvi attempts to withdraw, but Sivaji dismisses the superstition and convinces her to proceed with the marriage.

Adiseshan escalates his sabotage by manipulating judicial levers, dragging Sivaji into a targeted state litigation. The court rules against the foundation, forcing its immediate closure and stripping a bankrupt Sivaji of his remaining possessions. Realizing that playing by the rules has failed him, Sivaji alters his strategy to fight the system from within. Aided by his maternal uncle, Arivu, he uses a specialized digital wiretap to intercept proof of Adiseshan's hidden ₹2 billion illegal cash reserves. He blackmails the tycoon, forcing him to surrender half the fortune. When Adiseshan dispatches a squad of mercenaries to reclaim the funds, Sivaji brutally subdues them, subsequently reforming the henchmen by offering their families employment within his revived trust. He systematically applies the same extortion tactic against every corrupt politician and bureaucrat who previously exploited him. To legitimize the recovered billions, he routes the funds through an intricate network of international friends who return the money to India disguised as foreign philanthropic donations. After alerting the Income Tax Department to secure Adiseshan's arrest for massive tax evasion, Sivaji marries Tamizhselvi.

Sivaji next leverages incriminating evidence against the corrupt Chief Minister, forcing the legal reopening of the Sivaji Foundation. Adiseshan, having secured bail, manipulates Tamizhselvi's naive anxieties through compromised CBI operatives, tricking her into surrendering Sivaji's encrypted laptop. Sivaji is promptly arrested. Adiseshan and complicit police officials attempt to bypass the laptop's advanced voice-recognition encryption, but Sivaji refuses to cooperate, prompting them to torture him to the brink of cardiac arrest. To conceal the custodial abuse, Adiseshan coordinates a staged ambush on the police transit van, intending to frame external mercenaries for Sivaji's murder.

However, having been tipped off about the execution plot by a sympathetic constable, Sivaji successfully fakes his death inside the holding cell by intentionally electrocuting himself to induce a temporary state of suspended animation. During the staged transit ambush, a medical rescue team led by his close friend Dr. Chezhian, along with Tamizhselvi and Arivu, covertly intercepts the vehicle, swaps Sivaji's body with an anatomical dummy, and revives him using a defibrillator.

Following his official "death," the CBI's repeated failed attempts to access the laptop trigger a security wipe, permanently erasing his files. Days later, a fully recovered Sivaji returns to the public eye under the guise of an enigmatic, wealthy Non-Resident Indian named M. G. Ravichandran, assuming control of the thriving foundation. Though an infuriated Adiseshan instantly recognizes the deception, he lacks the legal standing to expose him. Sivaji corners Adiseshan at his flagship commercial college, culminating in a violent rooftop confrontation. During the scuffle, Sivaji fractures the structural ceiling of Adiseshan's hidden treasury room. Millions of illicit currency rain down onto the campus below, inciting a massive student stampede in which Adiseshan is trampled to death. With the opposition dismantled, the Sivaji Foundation flourishes, permanently altering the country's socioeconomic landscape.

== Cast ==
- Rajinikanth as Sivaji Arumugam / M. G. Ravichandran
- Shriya Saran as Tamizhselvi, Sivaji's love interest and turned wife (Voiced by Kaniha)
- Vivek as Arivu, Sivaji's uncle and sidekick
- Suman as Adiseshan (Voiced by Subbu Panchu)
- Manivannan as Aarumugam, Sivaji's father
- Vadivukkarasi as Parvathi Aarumugam, Sivaji's mother
- Cochin Haneefa as Minister Kuzhandhaivel
- Ravikumar as Minister Anbanandam
- Solomon Pappayya as Thondaimaan, Ramalingam's neighbour
- Pattimandram Raja as Ramalingam, Tamizhselvi's father
- Shanmugarajan as ACP Arivazhagan
- Livingston as Inspector Ram Kumar
- Pyramid Natarajan as Lawyer Krishnamurthi
- M. S. Bhaskar as Pazhanisamy
- Uma Padmanabhan as Jyothi Ramalingam, Tamizhselvi's mother
- Vasu Vikram as MLA Ramasamy
- Bose Venkat as Velu, Aathisheshan's Right Hand
- Mahadevan as Vikadanthan
- Raghuvaran as Dr. Chezhian
- Nayanthara in a cameo appearance in the song "Baleilakka"
- Ilavarasu as Constable Rangadurai
- Chinni Jayanth
- Mayilsamy
- Dhamu as a mimicry artist who tried to open Sivaji's laptop
- Kanal Kannan as a henchman
- Muthukaalai
- Halwa Vasu as Iyyappan, Arivu's friend
- Swaminathan as Narayanan
- Karate Raja as Adiseshan's henchman who joins Sivaji
- Chelladurai

Uncredited

- Tirlok Malik as Sivaji's friend
- Meesai Rajendranath as a police inspector
- S. Shankar in a cameo appearance in the song "Baleilakka"
- K. V. Anand in a cameo appearance in the song "Baleilakka"
- Thota Tharani in a cameo appearance in the song "Baleilakka"

== Production ==
=== Development ===
In 1996, following the release of his Indian, Shankar approached and pitched three storylines to Rajinikanth to consider for his next venture. This included scripts which would later become Sivaji (2007), Enthiran (2010) and I (2015). Rajinikanth was sceptical and refused all three scripts at the time.

In August 2005, Rajinikanth signed up for his next film which was to be produced by Chennai's oldest operative studio, AVM Productions, which was run by M. S. Guhan and M. Saravanan. This time Shankar was confirmed to be the film's director. After consulting Sivaji Ganesan's family to avoid any issues with the film's name, the project was subsequently announced on 24 August 2005 under the title Sivaji. A tagline, The Boss, which stands for "Bachelor of Social Service", was suffixed to the title.

In addition to being AVM Productions' 168th film, Sivaji was also Rajinikanth's 154th film, his 100th Tamil film (Note: Not counting other language films.) and his ninth film with AVM Productions. According to Rajinikanth's biographer Naman Ramachandran, the film was also made to commemorate the 100th birth anniversary of the production company's founder, A. V. Meiyappan. Sivaji was also noted for its change in the traditional yellow-coloured Rajinikanth introductory text which made its debut with Annaamalai (1992). Instead the text is displayed in Chrome.

=== Cast and crew ===
The first choice for the role of the female lead was Aishwarya Rai. However, in October 2005, Shankar and Rajinikanth announced that actress Shriya Saran would play the female lead role. Saran's voice was dubbed by actress Kanika, who was selected after a successful voice test, thereby collaborating for the second time with Shankar. (Note: Kanika had earlier dubbed for Sadha in Anniyan (2005).) Actor Vivek was signed up for the role of Sivaji's maternal uncle, Arivu, in November 2005. Actress Sunaina was to have made her acting debut through this film; her scene however was removed from the final cut. Nayanthara, who had earlier worked with Rajinikanth in Chandramukhi, was signed up to perform a special appearance alongside Rajinikanth in the song "Baleilakka".

Suman was confirmed in March 2006 to play the antagoinst role of Adiseshan after Amitabh Bachchan, Mohanlal and Prakash Raj were considered. Sathyaraj, who acted with Rajinikanth in Mr. Bharath (1986), said he declined the role because, "After a film of the calibre of Mr. Bharath with Rajnikanth, I couldn't settle for anything less". In another interview, he said he wanted to focus on playing lead roles and hence declined to play an antagonist. Mohanlal said he declined as he could not commit to the project for an entire year without missing out on other projects. For his role, Suman removed his moustache and used dentures to make his smile visible. Shankar instructed one of the costume designers to give the character a spotless white dhoti, shirt, shoes, a Rolex watch and Ray-Ban sunglasses. Before this, Suman had acted with Rajinikanth in Thee (1981). Subbu Panchu dubbed for Suman. Debate speakers Solomon Pappaiah and Pattimandram Raja were selected to play supporting roles, with the latter making his cinematic acting debut. Vadivukkarasi and Manivannan were selected to play Sivaji's parents. Raghuvaran appeared in a small role as Dr. Chezhian.

Shankar, who also wrote the film's story and screenplay, was paid a then record salary of ₹100 million (Indian rupees) (Note: The average exchange rate in 2007 was 39.33 Indian rupees (₹) per 1 US dollar (US$).) for the project. A. R. Rahman, who was selected to compose the film's soundtrack and background score, was also paid ₹30 million. Sujatha was assigned to write the dialogues for Sivaji. Tha. Prabhu Raja Cholan, who would later direct the film Karuppampatti (2013), worked as an assistant director in this film. Rajinikanth's daughter Soundarya worked as a graphics designer, creating the title for this film; she had earlier worked in the same position on two of her father's films – Baba (2002) and Chandramukhi (2005). K. V. Anand was hired as the cinematographer in August 2005. Manish Malhotra was responsible for designing the film's costumes, while Anthony and Thota Tharani were the editor and art director respectively. Additional make-up for Rajinikanth was done by make-up artist Banu. Director S. P. Muthuraman worked as the film's co-producer.

=== Filming ===
Principal photography commenced on 28 November 2005 with a puja at AVM Productions. The film's launch was a secret event, with only pivotal members of the cast and crew being called for the event's attendance. The first schedule of Sivaji began on 14 December 2005 with the song "Vaaji Vaaji" featuring Rajinikanth and Saran being shot at Ramoji Film City in Hyderabad. The idea of shooting at Ramoji Film City was suggested to Shankar by Tharani who felt that the place offered a lot of scope for him to use his skills and experience as an art director. "Vaaji Vaaji" was picturised with an intention to showcase a Babylonian palace setting when Shankar requested Tharani to show "a palace with lots of colour". Tharani created a four-storey Babylonian palace to accommodate 80 dancers and 100 junior artists for the number. The set was built within 30 days. Shooting of the number, which according to K. V. Anand was filmed in Super 35 motion picture film format, was completed in eight days. G. Dhananjayan mentions in his book The Best of Tamil Cinema that ₹35 million was spent on the song's making.

I decided to have a glass dome depicting four seasons. But Shankar was specific, saying he wanted the desert and the flowers look. So, we decided to have desert on one side and rocks, waterfalls and flowers on the other.

— Thota Tharani, on his experience of designing the set for the "Sahana" number.

Tharani described the set designing for the song "Sahana", which was also shot at Ramoji Film City, as "extremely challenging". After listening to the lyrics of the song which speaks of the four traditional calendar seasons, Tharani thought of using a concept titled Living in Seasons, which he used at a symposium held in Japan. (Note: The Hindu gives the year the symposium was held as 1991, while Rediff.com states the year to be 1992.) For the set's design which depicted the four seasons, Tharani proposed three concepts – a traditional Japanese house, a contemporary house and a futuristic house. Shankar chose the futuristic house concept, which consisted of three domes in the shapes of a square, a circle and a pyramid adjacent to one another. The circular dome had a pathway around it and water falling from a 50 feet high rock, which would seep under the set. Tharani made use of acrylic glass and normal glass with the former being implemented on the floor to make the dance movements easier to perform. Construction of the set for the number was completed in 30 days.

In addition to these two songs, Tharani contributed to similar creations for the music store where Tamizhselvi works as a saleswoman, the street surrounding the music store, the warehouse behind the music store, the interior portions of Thamizhselvi's house and Adiseshan's office room. The music shop was designed in the Victorian architecture style, while the warehouse was constructed at AVM Productions with the fight sequence being filmed there as well. Filming of another action sequence in an open-air theatre, which was also designed by Tharani, took place for approximately 15–20 days. K. V. Anand used balloon lights brought from a French company Airstar Space Lighting for the sequence. The interior portions of Thamizhselvi's house was designed using clippings of flats constructed by the Tamil Nadu Housing Board.

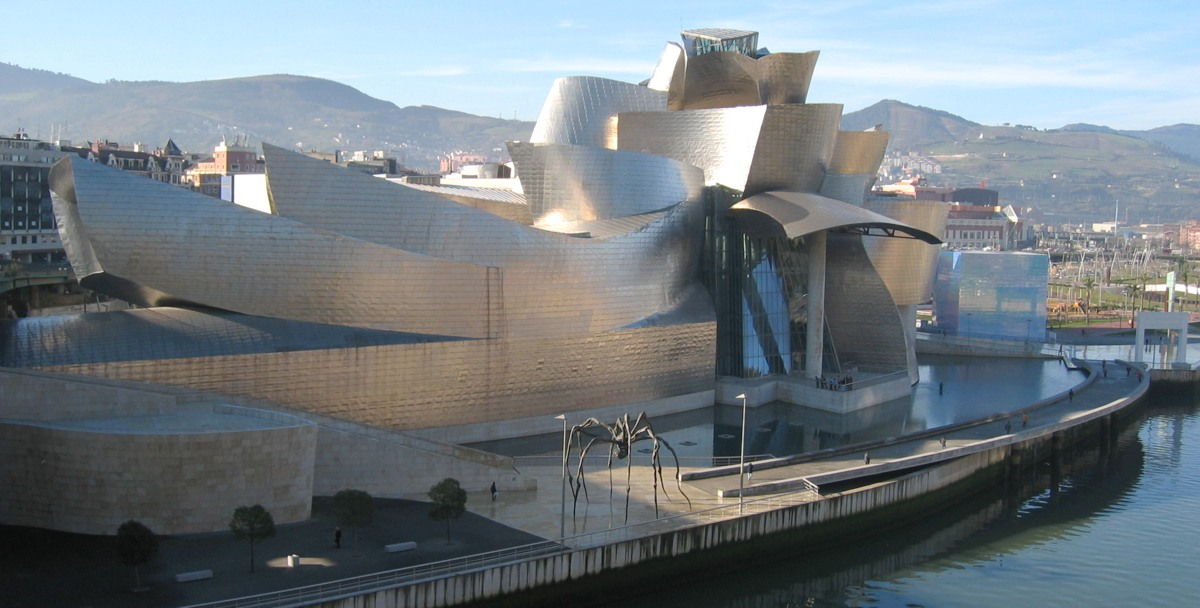
The Guggenheim Museum Bilbao which features in "Style".

The "Style" segment was filmed in May 2006 at the Frank Gehry-designed Guggenheim Museum in Bilbao, Spain, as well as the City of Arts and Sciences of Valencia and the Kursaal in San Sebastian.

The fair look of Rajinikanth's character in the segment was created using computer-generated imagery, which was performed by V. Srinivas Mohan, the head of the Chennai-based firm Indian Artists. K. V. Anand re-shot every single movement of Rajinikanth with a British woman named Jacky, who was also one of the song's background dancers. All the shots featuring Rajinikanth in the song and those featuring Jacky were scanned in 4K resolution to enhance their clarity after which Jacky's skin colour was digitally implemented onto Rajinikanth's skin. In a scene, Rajinikanth and Shriya Saran imitated the dance from songs from three Tamil films starring Sivaji Ganesan, MGR and Kamal Haasan, respectively. For the Telugu dubbed version, the scene instead featured songs from films starring ANR, NTR and Chiranjeevi, respectively. French hair-stylist Sandrin Veriar Seth designed two distinct hair-styles for the entire film and 13 hair-styles for the segment alone. To avoid disruptions that could occur at the shooting spot due to Rajinikanth's fan following in Tamil Nadu, Brinda choreographed "Balleilakka", Rajinikanth's introduction song sequence in Wai, a hill station near Pune with 500 people for eight days. To add more colour to the sequence, a 50-member team of Puli Kali artists from Thrissur were employed by Shankar as background dancers.

In November 2006, sequences featuring Rajinkanth, Saran and Vivek were shot at the Pune Junction railway station. Filming of a key portion involving Rajinikanth and Vivek took place in the Victoria Public Hall building in Chennai. A fight sequence and the song "Athiradi" were filmed at Binny Mills. The sets for the song were made bearing resemblance to the city of Venice. For the climax scenes, which were filmed at the Magarpatta city SEZ towers, Rajinikanth tonsured his head. The scenes where Sivaji gets the money he transferred to his friends by forgery were filmed in New York City. The completion of those scenes in February 2007 marked the end of the principal photography. The climactic fight between Sivaji and Adiseshan was filmed at Vels University. K. V. Anand told Shobha Warrier of Rediff.com that the portions other than the songs and action sequences were completed in 65 days.

== Themes and influences ==
Many critics stated that the theme of Sivaji has been inspired from Shankar's previous films Gentleman (1993) and Mudhalvan (1999). The film deals with the concept of corruption and money laundering and how the film's protagonist employs methods to get rid of those elements. Gopinath Rajendran of The New Indian Express compared the film's title character to Robin Hood for being a hero "who takes from the rich and passes it on to the poor".

Sivaji, who is a software engineer is frustrated with the corruption in India which is shown in the scene where he watches the pitiable condition of poor people stating that: "The rich get richer, the poor get poorer". Sivaji's love for his country is also illustrated in a scene where he is advised by his uncle to go back to abroad but he says "Where else will I go? This is home."

== Music ==
After some re-recording of the background score in Paraguay, A.R. Rahman had been to London for additional re-recording.

A month and a half prior to the film's official soundtrack release, three songs from the soundtrack were leaked into the Internet. The songs, however, were only unofficial with low quality, where the official versions were composed slightly different and sung by different artists.

== Release ==
The television rights of the film were sold to Kalaignar TV for ₹4 crore. The film's distribution rights, as distributed by AVM Productions to various companies are ₹35 million (US$370,000) for the selling of rights to Kerala, ₹140 million (US$1.5 million) for Andhra Pradesh and ₹139.5 million (US$1.5 million) for the rights to Ayngaran, an international Tamil film distributor. The trailer was released by CNN-IBN on 30 May 2007 lasting for three minutes. The official trailer was released by AVM to Galatta.com, the official online sponsor and Ayngaran International. The film was supposed to be released on the Tamil New Year's day, 14 April 2007, but due to post-production delays, the film was released worldwide on 15 June 2007. On 15 July 2007, AVM Productions, the producers of the film, announced their decision to dub the film into Hindi. That version was released on 8 January 2010.

M. Satyamoorthy, on 9 July 2007, sought to stop the film being screened, claiming that it defamed the Indian National Congress, a political party, as well as its president, Sonia Gandhi, and the then Prime Minister of India, Manmohan Singh. Satyamoorthy cited a scene in which portraits of Gandhi and Singh are visible behind Adiseshan's chair, implying that Adiseshan was a member of the Indian National Congress. Satyamoorthy also claimed ₹500 million (US$5.3 million) in damages from the film's producer, director and lead actor to be paid to the Tamil Nadu section of the party. Jaya Rajadevan, one of the film's assistant directors, sought an injunction in civil court to stop screening of the film for alleged plagiarism. Rajadevan claimed that he had written the film's story and had discussed it with Shankar's manager in 2005. Although the court sent notices to Shankar, among others, the screening of the film was not stopped.

=== Special screenings ===
Rajinikanth used his political affiliations to screen the film for several politicians. He went to Hyderabad to showcase the film for the former Andhra Pradesh Chief Minister, Chandrababu Naidu, on 14 June 2007. At the screening, Rajinikanth told the media that he would invite the Chief Minister, Rajasekhara Reddy, for a special viewing as well. Rajinikanth said that he had screened the film to current and former Tamil Nadu Chief Ministers, Dr. Karunanidhi and Jayalalitha, respectively, and that India's Finance Minister, P Chidambaram, was also keen to watch the film. A private screening was also shown to Amitabh Bachchan. Mammootty saw a special preview of the film at Shenoys theatre in Ernakulam. After the screening he says, "It is a very good commercial film. Rajnikant has a halo around him; the man is amazing, simple and straight forward with no starry airs."

=== 3D re-release ===
A 2012 re-release, also known as Sivaji 3D, was created by re-mastering the original to Dolby Atmos and post-converting to 3D format and cutting half an hour of running time. Sivaji 3D is the first Indian film to be launched with the new Dolby Atmos platform. The trailer of 3D version was launched on 13 August 2012 at Prasad Labs along with Rajinikanth. The 3D version released on 12 December 2012, coinciding with Rajinikanth's birthday. The runtime of 3D version was shorter than original, cut to 155.22 minutes.

== Box office ==
The theatrical rights of the film were sold for ₹26 million (US$280,000) in Kerala and ₹80 million (US$850,000) in Andhra Pradesh. Worldwide, the film was estimated to have been released in about 750 screens. The film opened to virtually full cinemas. Sivaji was released in 303 screens in Tamil Nadu, 300 screens in Andhra Pradesh; 12 screens in North India and 145 screens across the rest of the world. It was released in 16 screens in Chennai and grossed ₹1.35 crore (US$140,000) within the first four days, at that point a new record for Tamil cinema. The film also debuted well in Kerala and in Bangalore. Despite protests from pro-Kannada groups, the film debuted in 13 screens. In the national capital, New Delhi, the film debuted on 4 screens in PVR Cinemas. Based on what the distributors claim, there was "overwhelming response to the film", with the number of screens increasing to 12 by the second week. The film made a good debut in the nation's other metros as well such as Mumbai and Kolkata, as well as in other non-traditional markets for Tamil films such as Pune and Baroda. The film grossed ₹ 4.07 crore in two weeks; ₹ 8.5 crore in five weeks, and ₹ 10 crore in seven weeks in Chennai.

Sivaji was also successful in international markets. The film had a wide release with over 145 prints and in 200 theatres (Tamil Version alone) in over 20 countries across South East Asia, Europe, North America, GCC and Australia and others, one of the widest release for an Indian film in the international markets. Internationally, Sivaji had good screenings in Malaysia. grossing over US$2 million in Malaysia, Sivaji made a debut with 150 shows in Singapore. In Sri Lanka, the film debuted across 70 screens with all 700 shows virtually sold out. In the Persian Gulf that contains a sizeably large Indian diaspora, the film opened to a good response. The film has collected over $8.5 Million from the overseas markets.

In Canada, the film released in 10 screens in 3 major cities along with special screenings for the Tamil diaspora in the smaller cities. In the United Kingdom, the film debuted on the box-office list at No.9 with earnings of about £14,000 per screen and was the first Tamil film to enter UK Top 10. In the United States, Sivaji was released in 24 screens with subsequent additions of 19 screens for the Tamil version. The producers of the film claimed that the film was going to be dubbed in Chinese and Japanese by Ayngaran International, the holder of international rights of the film. The response in Cape Town was disappointing, while the box-office collections in Johannesburg and Durban allowed it to become the first Tamil film to feature in the South African box-office top 10. Singapore Airlines bought a 3-month exclusive in-flight screening rights to the film, a first for the airline for any Tamil film.

In the UK, 13 seconds of the film was cut. The original film showed Rajinikanth throwing a firecracker into his mouth, lighting it and then spitting it out at Pattimanram Raja, which was removed to give the film a 12A rating, The Ayngaran UK DVD release was uncut and given an 18 rating by the BBFC. It was also the first Tamil film to be officially released on a 1080p High Definition Blu-ray disc. In addition, the 3D re-release (which was already shortened by half-an-hour) was cut further to remove scenes of bloody injury and violence in 2 scenes to get a 12A rating.

The worldwide box office collection of Sivaji was ₹100—160 crore. The overseas distributor Ayngaran International reported collections as follows: US$2,000,000, Canada $500,000, UK$750,000, Europe and Gulf $750,000, Malaysia $2,000,000, Singapore $750,000, Sri Lanka $1,250,000, Australia, New Zealand & Thailand $250,000. Sivaji was released in South Africa in late July 2007 after six weeks of its release by the leading South African distributor Ster Kinekor with four prints and released in Johannesburg, Cape Town and Durban.

=== Records ===
Sivaji was the first Tamil film to enter the 100 crore club. It was also the first South Indian film to achieve this feat. Additionally, Sivaji was the first Indian film to gross ₹150 crore worldwide and became the highest-grossing Indian film at the time of its release.

Sivaji: The Boss completed its 50-day theatrical run in nearly 800 theatres worldwide. This movie ran for 100 days in over 100 theatres in India and abroad, completing its centenary run in approximately 111 theatres across regions including Tamil Nadu and overseas markets and completed 175 days in a few theatres.

Sivaji: The Boss is regarded as a pioneer of the modern wide-release strategy in Tamil Nadu, having been released simultaneously in a record number of theatres across the state to maximise early theatrical attendance and limit the impact of piracy.

== Critical response ==
Sivaji: The Boss received positive reviews from critics. On the review aggregator website Rotten Tomatoes, 82% of 269 critics' reviews are positive, with an average rating of 7.6/10.

Malathi Rangarajan of The Hindu, in a review about the story, said that the lead character carrying out a rebellion against corruption was something "not be true to life". She concluded by saying that "the story sags towards the end". She, however, appreciated the performances of the prominent actors, the soundtrack, art direction, photography and the animation. Ananth Krishnan, another review from The Hindu, a month after the film's release, said that the film "... presents an effective diagnosis of entrenched corruption but the rather disturbing remedy it offers is, good old vigilantism." It concluded by saying that, though the film did well at the box-office, the message of rejecting the corrupt system instead of reforming it was troubling.

T. S. V. Hari of Hindustan Times said that the director, Shankar, was not creative enough for the film and added this by saying "Sivaji turns out to be a rehash of all his previous jingoistic claptrap efforts". It appreciated the other technical departments and suggested a good response at the box office. The Times of India had a similar review about the story saying that "it had nothing new to offer" but promised it to be entertaining and gave it four stars. Nidarsana of Kalki praised the performances of Rajini, Vivek, Shriya and Suman, Vivek's humour while also praising Tharani's art direction, Anand's cinematography and Sujatha's dialogues but felt Shankar compromised a lot for Rajinikanth as the subject of black money is dealt just like that and due to story taking a backseat with Rajini taking the forefront, Sivaji feels deserted without Shankar's signature yet Shankar is on par with himself for portraying Rajini as larger than life.

R. G. Vijayasarathy of Rediff.com summed the film by saying, "No logic, only Rajni's magic". About the story, he said, "Unfortunately, (the) message is lost in the maze of illogical and sometimes absurd sequences". The review, however, praised the performances of Rajinikanth, Shriya and Vivek and the technical crew. Sify wrote: "There is only one hero here, [..] – Rajni himself. Such is the overpowering screen presence of his cinematic charisma in every frame of the film. The film works big time as Shankar has made the film on a grand scale, [..] which is a visual treat with superbly choreographed action scenes. All this comes with top-of-the-line techno-finesse, perhaps the best ever in Tamil cinema" and also wrote that "Technically, [..] a revelation [..] there are stunning visuals, which is paisa vasool. K.V.Anand's cinematography is top class. Art director Thotta Tharani work is enticing, especially the sets in songs". Ananda Vikatan rated the film 41 out of 100.

== Accolades ==
2007 National Film Awards

- Won – Silver Lotus Award for Best Special Effects – M.S. Indian Artists, Chennai

55th Filmfare Awards South

- Won – Filmfare Award for Best Music Director – A.R. Rahman
- Won – Filmfare Award for Best Cinematographer – K. V. Anand
- Won – Filmfare Best Art Director Award – Thotta Tharani
- Nominated – Filmfare Award for Best Actor – Rajinikanth
- Nominated – Filmfare Award for Best Film – Sivaji
- Nominated – Filmfare Award for Best Playback Singer Female – Chinmayi

2007 Vijay Awards

- Won – Vijay Award for Favourite Hero – Rajinikanth
- Nominated – Vijay Award for Favourite Heroine – Shriya Saran
- Won – Vijay Award for Best Music Director – A.R. Rahman

2007 Tamil Nadu State Film Awards

- Won- Tamil Nadu State Film Award for Best Film – First Prize

== Legacy ==
Brahmanandam, Sunil, M. S. Bhaskar, Komal and Rangayana Raghu spoofed the character M. G. Ravichandran in Lakshmi Putrudu (2008), Kantri (2008), Maasilamani (2009), Thipparalli Tharlegalu (2010), and Rama Rama Raghurama (2011), respectively.

== Sources ==
- Dhananjayan, G. (2011). The Best of Tamil Cinema, 1931 to 2010: 1977–2010. Galatta Media. OCLC 733724281.
- Dhananjayan, G. (2014). Pride of Tamil Cinema: 1931–2013. Blue Ocean Publishers. OCLC 898765509.
- Ramachandran, Naman (2014) [2012]. Rajinikanth: The Definitive Biography. New Delhi: Penguin Books. ISBN 978-0-14-342111-5.
