= Indru Poi Naalai Vaa =

1981 film by K. Bhagyaraj

- Poster
- Directed by: K. Bhagyaraj
- Written by: K. Bhagyaraj
- Produced by: V. F. Irani
- Starring: K. Bhagyaraj; Radhika; Pazhanisamy; G. Ramli
- Cinematography: M. C. Sekar
- Edited by: T. Ravisekar
- Music by: Ilaiyaraaja
- Production company: Rishad Creations
- Release date: 27 March 1981
- Running time: 137 minutes
- Country: India
- Language: Tamil

Indru Poi Naalai Vaa (transl. Go Today, Come Tomorrow) is a 1981 Indian Tamil-language romantic comedy film written and directed by K. Bhagyaraj. The film stars himself, Radhika, Pazhanisamy and G. Ramli. It revolves around three men in love with the same woman, and their attempts to woo her.

The film was released on 27 March 1981. It was officially remade in Telugu as Kokkaroko (1993) and unofficially in Tamil as Kanna Laddu Thinna Aasaiya (2013).

== Plot ==
Pazhanisamy, Venkat and Rajendran are three friends who ogle girls. An innocent girl Jaya and her family shifts to the house opposite Pazhanisamy's. The trio ogle Jaya from Pazhanisamy's house window. When Venkat and Rajendran go out, Pazhanisamy selfishly locks the house and spends all day smoking and watching Jaya's house. Venkat and Rajendran catch Pazhanisamy's selfish act and 3 of them challenge to win Jaya's love. The next day, Pazhanisamy notices Puppy, a toddler in Jaya's house, near the road. He carries her and lies to her mother and Jaya he saved her from an oncoming lorry. The mother and Jaya thank Pazhanisamy for his kindness and Pazhanisamy voluntarily takes care of Puppy. He starts to help out Puppy's mother in household chores to impress Jaya.

Rajendran is a college student and so, he purposely makes inappropriate sketches on the blackboard and pretends to scold his classmates for their immaturity. The Hindi teacher chances on this and is impressed. Rajendran takes advantage of the positive impression of him in the Hindi teacher's mind and requests to join his tuition to learn Hindi. The Hindi teacher is none other than Jaya's father. But the Hindi teacher tells Rajendran he will conduct his tuition in Rajendran's house instead of his. Rajendran is dismayed by this. At his house, Rajendran annoys the teacher by not co-operating and seeking the support of his nagging grandmother. The teacher gets irritated to the point where he decides to teach Rajendran at his house. But the teacher repeatedly hits Rajendran when he makes mistakes and Rajendran plans to take revenge on him if Jaya fails to fall for him.

Venkat gathers information about Jaya's grandfather from the local shopkeeper and plans to trap him in a pothole during his early morning jog. His plan is to trap the grandfather and save him to impress Jaya. But the grandfather jumps out of the pothole himself, foiling Venkat's plan. Venkat sends goons to beat the grandfather so he can put up an act of saving him but the goons get suppressed by him too. The grandfather is a martial artist and so, Venkat decides to learn boxing from him at his house. Jaya's grandfather takes him in but the boxing training is strenuous for Venkat. If Jaya does not fall for him, Venkat plans to take revenge on the grandfather for his physical torture. The next day, at 5:00 am, Pazhanisamy sends a soothsayer to Jaya's house. The soothsayer tells Jaya that, at 7:00 am, her future groom will cross your house in a black shirt and white pants. At 7:00 am, Jaya waits outside her house for the groom. Pazhanisamy comes out in black shirt and white pants but is startled when Jaya cheekily lies to him the soothsayer told her the groom will be in white shirt and black pants. Pazhanisamy believes her and beats up the soothsayer, who swears he did not lie.

One day, Venkat submits a love letter to Jaya who is feeling mixed about it. Jaya's sister arrives from her hometown and plans to stay there for several days. She notices the 3 friends carefully and surmises they are trying to win Jaya's love. She tells this to Jaya. Jaya is in a dilemma on who she should choose as her love. The sister gives her an idea to resolve the dilemma. The next day, Jaya calls the 3 friends to meet at a park and tells all of them she was impregnated by a stranger several months earlier. By right, she must marry the stranger as he is the father of her child. The 3 friends are dejected. As planned, Rajendran and Venkat take revenge on the Hindi teacher and the grandfather respectively. But Pazhanisamy is still loyal to Puppy's mother and impresses Jaya. Jaya decides Pazhanisamy will be her true lover.

Jaya's father proudly tells her about his former student working in the United States and she sees his photo in the newspaper. Jaya then approaches Pazhanisamy and requests him to reunite her with the stranger who impregnated her. She gives the photo in the newspaper to Pazhanisamy and says he is the stranger. Pazhanisamy takes the photo and looks all around for the stranger. He stumbles on a gangster, who resembles the guy in the photo. Pazhanisamy persuades him to marry Jaya. The gangster plans to use the chance to sell Jaya as a prostitute to Arabia and agrees. Pazhanisamy brings Jaya to the gangster the next morning and Jaya is appalled to see her playful lie transformed into a threat. She admits the truth to Pazhanisamy and gives him a love letter she wrote. Pazhanisamy is relieved and apologises to the gangster. The dimwitted gangster and his equally dimwitted men kidnap Jaya and hurry to Arabia by jeep, thinking it is in Tamil Nadu). Venkat and Rajendran arrive, and together with Pazhanisamy, pursue the jeep to save Jaya. The trio fight the gangsters and soon, Jaya's father and grandfather join the fight. Pazhanisamy saves Jaya and her sister lets them marry there itself. The newlyweds use the gangster's jeep as their wedding chariot.

== Cast ==
- K. Bhagyaraj as Pazhanisamy
- Radhika as Jaya
- Pazhanisamy as Venkat
- G. Ramli as Rajendran
- Kallapetti Singaram as Jaya's grandfather
- Gandhimathi as Jaya's mother
- V. R. Thilagam
- V. K. Padmini as Jaya's sister
- D. Suryakanth as a gangster
- M. Sivaraman
- Chinna Murugan as Goruvan(Laundry Man)
- Senthil as a thug
- V. M. John as IC Govindasamy

== Production ==
Bhagyaraj claimed to have written the script for Indru Poi Naalai Vaa "overnight". The film's title was derived from a line told by Rama to Ravana in Tamil translations of the Hindu epic Ramayana. Apart from writing and directing, Bhagyaraj himself acted in the lead role with his long time friends Pazhanisamy and Ramli portraying secondary roles. Regarding the creation of V. M. John's character, the Hindi teacher who teaches a reluctant student (Ramli's character), he said this was a reference to the Anti-Hindi agitations of Tamil Nadu, noting how the Hindi language "was looked at as something not needed that was being forced upon people".

== Themes ==
Malathi Rangarajan of The Hindu compared Indru Poi Naalai Vaa to Uttharavindri Ulle Vaa (1971) as both films revolved around the concept of multiple men trying to woo the same woman.

== Soundtrack ==
The music was composed by Ilaiyaraaja.

Track listing
| No. | Title | Lyrics | Singer(s) | Length |
|---|---|---|---|---|
| 1. | "Ammadi Chinna" | Muthulingam | Malaysia Vasudevan, T. L. Maharajan | 4:12 |
| 2. | "Mathana Moha Roobasundari" | Gangai Amaran | Malaysia Vasudevan, S. P. Sailaja | 4:49 |
| 3. | "Mere Pyari" | Gangai Amaran | T. L. Maharajan | 4:13 |
| 4. | "Palanaal Aasai" | Muthulingam | Malaysia Vasudevan, P. Susheela | 4:28 |
| Total length: | | | | 17:42 |

== Critical reception ==
Nalini Sastry of Kalki wrote that she felt since Bhagyaraj gave a disclaimer of this made only for sole intention of making audiences laugh, one should not look out for logic with her listing out humorous scenes in the review. Naagai Dharuman of Anna gave the film a positive review for its innovative story and praised Bhagyaraj for giving a film which succeeds in making viewers laugh.

== Legacy ==
The film attained cult status in Tamil cinema. Ramli's broken-Hindi dialogue "Ek gaon mein ek kissan raghu thatha" (transl. In a village there lived a farmer) attained immense popularity, and has since become a one-line synonym for a "person trying to learn Hindi and who speaks with a horrible accent". The line inspired a song of the same name for the film Sangili Bungili Kadhava Thorae (2016). The plot of the 1981 film Chashme Buddoor had similarities with this film. The Tamil film Raghu Thatha (2024) had its title derived from the Hindi dialogue from this film. The same film also has a song named "Ek Gaon Mein".
