= Vishakha Singh =

Indian actress and model (born 1985)

Visaka Singh
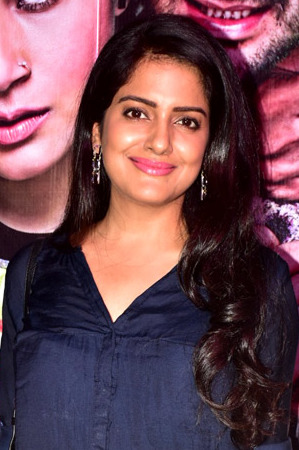
- Singh in 2017
- Born: 5 May 1985 (age 41); Abu Dhabi, United Arab Emirates
- Citizenship: India
- Occupations: Actress, Producer, Entrepreneur
- Years active: 2007-2017
- Known for: Fukrey

Vishakha Singh (born 5 May 1985) is an Indian actress, producer and entrepreneur.

She appeared in many South Indian language films debuting in Telugu film Gnapakam before starring in Bollywood projects with director Ashutosh Gowariker's 2010 Khelein Hum Jee Jaan Sey, alongside Abhishek Bachchan and Deepika Padukone. Her breakthrough role was in the Tamil film Kanna Laddu Thinna Aasaiya (2013).

== Personal life ==
Vishakha Singh was born 5 May 1985 in Abu Dhabi, United Arab Emirates.

She graduated from Abu Dhabi Indian School (ADIS) and Delhi Public School. She completed a degree in business studies from Delhi University. She did her post graduation in Advertising and Public Relations from the Indian Institute of Mass Communication, New Delhi.

== Career ==
She started modelling in 2007 and appeared in television and print commercials. She auditioned for a role in Chak De! India (2007), which didn't materialise. She made her feature film debut in 2007 with Telugu film Gnaapakam, which did not do well. After that, she starred in one Tamil, and two Kannada films: Pidichirukku, House Full, and Antharathma.

She made her Hindi film debut with Hum Se Jahan, which was never released on DVD and only in theatres, in 2008. However, she got noticed in director Ashutosh Gowarikar's Khelein Hum Jee Jaan Sey, for which she received a "Best Breakthrough Performance – Female" nomination from Stardust Awards (2011). She acted in Abhijeet Sengupta's Do Aur Do Paanch, which did not release.

In 2012 Vishakha ventured into film production by co-producing Peddlers, a film directed by Vasan Bala. The other producers were Guneet Monga and Anurag Kashyap Films. Peddlers was selected at the critic week at the Cannes Film Festival. She has also co-produced Haraamkhor, directed by Shlok Sharma, with Guneet Monga and AKFPL. The film was set to release in 2015.

After three years, she returned to acting in Tamil films. Vishakha's second Tamil film Kanna Laddu Thinna Aasaiya released on 13 January 2013 and went on to become the first blockbuster of the Tamil film industry in 2013. Back in Bollywood, she signed on three films that released in succession in 2013. Her first two films were Farhan Akhtar and Ritesh Sidhwani's Fukrey and Vikram Bhatt's Ankur Arora Murder Case; both films released on 14 June 2013. Her third film was director Shahant Shah's Bajatey Raho, which released the next month. She said that Fukrey changed people's perceptions of her, and that she turned down nine films after Fukrey.

Vishakha made her Malayalam debut in director Rajesh Pillai's forthcoming film Motorcycle Diaries, and her next Tamil film is with Vaaliba Raja, with the same team that worked on Kanna Laddu Thinna Aasaiya. She returned to Telugu films with Rowdy Fellow, opposite Nara Rohit as "a girl who looks like an angel but is a devil in disguise". She also acted in The Maya Tape, a horror thriller directed by Nikhil Alag, in which she plays a journalist. She was signed for an important, albeit a cameo, role in R. Kannan's Oru Oorla Rendu Raja.

== Social activism ==
Vishakha Singh along with Gopi Shankar Madurai launched multiple complaints on behalf of athlete Santhi Soundarajan in National Commission for Scheduled Castes and National Human Rights Commission of India also initiated Justice For Santhi Campaign which was instrumental in fetching her a permanent job at Tamil Nadu Sports Development Authority.

== Filmography ==
=== Films ===
| Year | Film | Role(s) | Language(s) | Notes |
|---|---|---|---|---|
| 2007 | Gnapakam | Sarangi | Telugu | |
| 2008 | Pidichirukku | Manju Mariyadas | Tamil | |
| 2008 | Humsey Hai Jahaan | Esha Singh | Hindi | |
| 2009 | House Full | Aishwarya | Kannada | |
| 2010 | Antharathma | Mahi Shyam | Kannada | |
| 2010 | The Genius of Beauty | | English | |
| 2010 | Khelein Hum Jee Jaan Sey | Pritilata Waddedar | Hindi | Nominated, Stardust Award for Breakthrough Performance – Female |
| 2013 | Kanna Laddu Thinna Aasaiya | Sowmiya | Tamil | |
| 2013 | Ankur Arora Murder Case | Dr. Riya | Hindi | |
| 2013 | Fukrey | Neetu | Hindi | |
| 2013 | Bajatey Raho | Manpreet | Hindi | |
| 2014 | Rowdy Fellow | Meghana | Telugu | |
| 2014 | Oru Oorla Rendu Raja | Kalpana | Tamil | Guest appearance |
| 2016 | Vaaliba Raja | Shalu | Tamil | |
| 2016 | Bayam Oru Payanam | Abhinya | Tamil | |
| 2017 | Fukrey Returns | Neetu Singh | Hindi | Guest appearance |
| TBA | The Maya Tape † | TBA | Hindi | Delayed |
| TBA | Thuram † | TBA | Telugu | Delayed |
| TBA | Motorcycle Diaries | Swathy | Malayalam | Unreleased |

=== As producer ===
| Year | Title | Producer | Notes |
|---|---|---|---|
| 2018 | Mehram | Co-producer | Short film |
| 2020 | Atkan Chatkan | Producer | Released on ZEE5 |

== Awards ==
2011: Nomination for "Best Breakthrough Performance – Female" from the Stardust Awards for her role in Khelein Hum Jee Jaan Sey.
