= Cadbury Shots =

Brand of confectionery

Shots are a brand of confectionery currently manufactured by Cadbury. They consist of milk chocolate balls coated in a hard sugar outer layer and are sold in Ireland and the United Kingdom.

In 2009 the packaging was re-designed to look similar to the Cadbury Clusters packaging. They are unusually hard to find, motorway service stations being one of the few places where they are almost certain to be found.

== India & South Africa ==
There is a variant of Shots available in India and South Africa under the Dairy Milk brand called "Dairy Milk Shots", which use a thinner coating of sugar than the ones in the UK.
