= Srinivasan (Tamil actor) =

Indian actor and comedian

- Born: Madurai, Tamil Nadu, India
- Other names: Powerstar, Power
- Occupation: Actor
- Years active: 2010–present

Srinivasan (known as Powerstar) is an Indian actor, doctor, politician, comedian, director, producer, singer and businessman who has worked in the Tamil film industry. Beginning his career as a medical practitioner, he moved into finance before embarking on making films starring himself. He then appeared in N. Santhanam's Kanna Laddu Thinna Aasaiya (2013) which gave him a breakthrough in receiving further offers for comedic roles.

== Career ==
Srinivasan completed his degree at Madurai Kamaraj University and then acquired a qualification as an acupressure practitioner from a university in China through a distance education programme, before commencing practise soon after. His passion for the film industry brought him to Chennai, where he set up a finance firm, Baba Trading Company, in Anna Nagar and advertised through brokers that he would help businessmen acquire huge bank loans. He played supporting roles in several films starting with Unakkaga Oru Kavithai (2010) before giving himself the sobriquet "Powerstar" in Neethana Avan (2010). Srinivasan soon went on to direct and star in a film titled Lathika, which released in 2011 with little publicity and featured primarily newcomers. The following year, the team of Lathika put up banners across vast areas in Chennai, remarking that Lathika had been successfully running for 220 days in the city albeit at a single cinema. The move brought him publicity and he gained online fan clubs for the bizarre claims, while he also went on to rechristen himself as 'Powerstar' Srinivasan. Srinivasan subsequently begun several other production ventures starring himself including Ananda Thollai, Abhinava and Desiya Nedunchalai, though most films remain partially shot. Srinivasan inadvertently had marketed himself as a spoof artist through his initial ploys and has since maintained a comic image with the media and on-screen, often portraying outrageous and over-the-top characters.

Actor Santhanam offered him a pivotal role in his first production Kanna Laddu Thinna Aasaiya (2013), to portray one of the three leading male roles. The film opened to positive reviews in January 2013, with critics calling it an "infectious" comedy and went on to do profitable business at the box office. Alongside his co-stars, critics noted that Srinivasan "scorches the screen" and his "comic timing makes the slapstick madness work". The success of the film garnered him offers from big productions, including Bala's Paradesi (2013) and Shankar's I; though his portions were later replaced in the former film.

Srinivasan has since gone on to appear in supporting roles in smaller budget films, notably playing pivotal characters in Arya Surya and Summa Nachunu Irukku (2013). He has also regularly appeared in promotional videos and single scene appearances in films, with small-time filmmakers keen to sell their films using his popular image. In early 2014, Srinivasan stated that he was unhappy that filmmakers were "betraying" him and depicting him in films. He delivered particular criticism to the makers of Ya Ya (2013) and Goli Soda (2014), who he argued used his presence in their films for cheap publicity.

== Personal life ==
Srinivasan was born in the Simmakal region in Madurai, Tamil Nadu. After leaving Madurai for Chennai, he bought and currently lives in a residence in Anna Nagar. He has been married twice, firstly with Vijaya of Madurai, whom he later divorced before marrying Julie from Anna Nagar. He has a daughter named Lathika, who he named his first production after.

Through his finance firm, Baba Trading Company, Srinivasan allegedly obtained over Rs. 7 crore rupees from unsuspecting businessmen and consequently used the money to begin a career in films, through his home production Lathika (2011). In 2012, Srinivasan was arrested by the Kilpauk police on charges of cheating and released on bail. The following year in April 2013, he was booked by the Central Crime Branch (CCB) and sent to prison and the development of more cases against him led to his office in Anna Nagar and a hospital he owned on Park Road, Anna Nagar West Extension, being shut. After a period in Delhi prison, he received bail in October 2013.

== Politics ==
Powerstar Srinivasan joined Tamil Maanila Katchi in 2015 at an event organised by the party.Srinivasan joined Bharatiya Janata Party on 2016 along with his wife. Later, he joined Republican Party of India and contested in the Lok Sabha elections in 2019 and the party RPI joined with Makkal Needhi Maiam. However, he lost to Thamizhachi Thangapandian, a DMK candidate to a margin of 1,73,272 votes in South Chennai.

He announced in 2020 that if actor Rajinikanth started his own political party he will also start a party and contest in the 2021 Tamil Nadu Election. He rejoined BJP. He and his wife were kidnapped by unknown persons for financial reasons and for some publicity stunt.

== Filmography ==
Year	Title	Role	Notes
2010	Unakkaga Oru Kavithai	Jairam	
2010	Indrasena		
2010	Neethana Avan	Vallal Perumal	
2010	Mandabam	Sabapathy	
2011	Lathika	Eeshwar	Also director and producer
2013	Kanna Laddu Thinna Aasaiya	Power Kumar	Nominated—SIIMA Award for Best Comedian – Tamil; Edison Award for Best Comedian
2013	Onbadhule Guru	Narrator	
2013	Azhagan Azhagi		Special appearance
2013	Summa Nachunu Irukku	Ashok Rajendran	
2013	Arya Surya	Aryananda	Also singer for "Vadapochae"
2013	Ya Ya	Beerpal	Cameo
2014	Thalaivan		Cameo appearance
2014	Vallavanukku Pullum Aayudham	Gang leader	Special appearance
2014	Vizhi Moodi Yosithaal	College Alumni	Guest appearance
2015	I	'Terror Star' Keerthivasan	Uncredited
2015	Sagaptham	R. Manmadhan	
2015	MGR Sivaji Rajini Kamal	Church father	Guest appearance
2015	Maharani Kottai		Guest appearance
2015	Maanga		
2015	Apoorva Mahaan		
2016	Sowkarpettai	Junior	
2016	Vaaliba Raja		Cameo appearance
2016	Narathan	Power Kumar	
2016	Kida Poosari Magudi		
2016	Manithan	Doctor	Guest appearance
2016	Sutta Pazham Sudatha Pazham		Also singer for "Gonganika"
2016	Adra Machan Visilu	Powerstar (Muniyandi)	
2016	Ka Ka Ka Po		
2016	Kagitha Kappal		
2017	Unnai Thottu Kolla Vaa	'Power' Annamalai	
2017	Vaanga Vaanga	Powerstar Srinivasan	
2017	Kavan	Powerstar Srinivasan	Guest Appearance
2017	Vilayattu Aarambam	Shah Rukh Khan	
2017	Aakkam		
2017	Enbathettu		
2017	Ilavatta Pasanga		
2017	Sakka Podu Podu Raja	Himself	
2018	Merlin		
2018	Mohana	Power Star	
2018	Kilambitaangayaa Kilambitaangayaa		
2018	Enna Thavam Seitheno		
2018	Odu Raja Odu		Cameo appearance
2018	Avalukkenna Azhagiya Mugam	Power Paandi	
2019	Simba	Veterinary surgeon	
2019	Pandiyum Sahakkalum	Gethu Sekar	
2019	Oviyavai Vitta Yaru	Vel Nayakar	
2019	Jaikka Povadhu Yaaru		
2019	Chennai 2 Bangkok		
2019	Capmaari	Power Pandy Durai	
2020	Marijuana	Theatre owner	
2020	Naanga Romba Busy	"Burma Bazaar" Poweru	Television film
2021	Pei Mama		
2022	John Ahiya Naan	Powerstar	Guest appearance
2023	Rayar Parambarai		
2023	Paatti Sollai Thattathe	Liquor smuggler	
2025	Yaman Kattalai		
2025	Mrs & Mr	Star	
2025	2K Heart		

== Television ==
Year	Title	Role	Network	Notes	Ref.
2021	Jothi	Minister Nagarajan	Sun TV	Guest appearance	
2021	LOL: Enga Siri Paapom	Contestant	Amazon Prime		
