= Kanna Laddu Thinna Aasaiya =

2013 Tamil film by K. S. Manikandan

- Theatrical release poster
- Directed by: K. S. Manikandan
- Based on: Indru Poi Naalai Vaa by K. Bhagyaraj
- Produced by: Santhanam (presents); Rama Narayanan
- Starring: Santhanam; Srinivasan; Sethu; Vishakha
- Cinematography: Balasubramaniem
- Edited by: G. Ramarao
- Music by: Thaman S
- Production companies: Handmade Films; Sri Thenandal Films
- Distributed by: Red Giant Movies
- Release date: 13 January 2013
- Running time: 146 minutes
- Country: India
- Language: Tamil
- Budget: ₹3 crore
- Box office: est. ₹12 crore

Kanna Laddu Thinna Aasaiya (transl. My dear, would you like to eat a laddu?), also known by the initialism KLTA, is a 2013 Indian Tamil-language romantic comedy film directed by K. S. Manikandan in his debut. The film stars Santhanam, Srinivasan, newcomer Sethu and Vishakha. Based on the 1981 Tamil Indru Poi Naalai Vaa by K. Bhagyaraj, it revolves around three friends who fall in love with a girl living in their neighbourhood.

Kanna Laddu Thinna Aasaiya marked Santhanam's venture into film production with his Handmade Films. The film was co-produced by Rama Narayanan via Sri Thenandal Films while Thaman S scored the soundtrack, and cinematography was handled by Balasubramaniem. It was released on 13 January 2013, and became a box office success.

== Plot ==
Kaalkattu Kaliyaperumal alias KK, Power Kumar and Shiva are three unemployed friends who frequently drink and chase girls. A girl named Sowmiya moves in with her family to the house opposite Shiva. The three friends are smitten by her and make a gentlemen's agreement to let the girl choose her boyfriend. The three attempt different methods to woo her. Shiva helps Sowmiya's aunt with household work; KK joins Sowmiya's uncle to learn singing; and Power joins Sowmiya's father to learn Bharatanatyam.

One day, when none of Sowmiya's family members are home, the three eventually profess their love, leaving Sowmiya confused. Following the advice of her neighbour, Sowmiya reveals to all three that she loves actor Simbu. The neighbourhood boys then decide to bring Simbu as a gift for Sowmiya's birthday, but Simbu denies knowing her. They then hire a thug named "Kolaveri" David to kidnap Simbu, but he kidnaps Sowmiya instead. As Simbu refused to help them, Shiva, KK, and Power go and save Sowmiya from David, and she chooses Shiva because Power and KK had earlier beaten Sowmiya's uncle and father severely; they later marry.

== Cast ==
- Santhanam as Kaalkattu Kaliyaperumal (KK)
- Srinivasan as Power Kumar (Power)
- Sethu as Shiva
- Vishakha as Sowmiya
- VTV Ganesh as Krishnamoorthi
- Sivasankar Master as Sowmiya's father
- Pattimandram Raja as Shiva's father
- Kovai Sarala as Sowmiya's aunt
- Vanitha Krishnachandran as Shiva's mother
- Devadarshini as Sowmiya's neighbour
- K. Bujji Babu as Power Kumar's father
- Master Ananthu as Sowmiya's brother
- Cool Suresh as Kolaveri David's henchman
- Ganeshkar as an auto driver
- Stunt Silva as Kolaveri David (uncredited)
- Swaminathan as Sowmiya's neighbour (uncredited)
- Lollu Sabha Manohar as an ad film actor (uncredited)
- Kanakarajsamy as Double-decker Narayanan (uncredited)
- Mippu as Kolaveri David's henchman (uncredited)

Cameo appearances

- Gautham Vasudev Menon as himself
- Silambarasan as himself
- Robert (in the song "Aasaiye Alai Poley")

== Production ==
Kanna Laddu Thinna Aasaiya marked actor Santhanam's venture into film production with his Handmade Films, and co-produced by Rama Narayanan. It was initially planned to be a film similar to the Hangover series, but due to budget constraints, the story was placed in Karaikudi and Kumbakonam. The film's title is derived from a phrase spoken by Karthi's character in Siruthai (2011), which also appeared in early Tamil Cadbury Shots advertisements. Rama Narayanan claimed the title was recommended by himself. It is the directorial debut of K. S. Manikandan. Cinematography was handled by Balasubramaniem, and editing by G. Ramarao.

Srinivasan, when approached by Santhanam to co-star, initially believed it was a joke, and learned about his role only when he went to shoot. Sethu, a longtime friend of Santhanam, was offered one of the lead roles, making his acting debut. Though Sethu was studying medicine at that time and was tempted to accept the film offer, Santhanam urged him to do so only after completing his education. Vishakha made her return to acting following a nearly-three year hiatus. The film, first reported in June 2012, was formally launched a month later. Vishaka agreed to dance to the song "Hey Unnathan" after Manikandan assured her it would not be oversexualised or have voyeuristic camera angles. By that November, filming was almost complete, except for two song sequences.

== Soundtrack ==
The music was composed by Thaman S. The audio was released on 9 December 2012. It features a remixed version of the song "Aasaiyae Alaipolae" from the 1958 film Thai Pirandhal Vazhi Pirakkum, composed by K. V. Mahadevan. The song "Love Letter" is based on "Naan Unnai Vaazhthi Paadugiren" from the 1971 film Nootruku Nooru, composed by V. Kumar.

Pramodh of Musicperk rated the album 7/10 stating, "The composer Thaman has done a credible job to make sure the album’s genre is met with properly". Srinivasa Ramanujam of The Times of India wrote, "KLTA is a collection of numbers that might work only if seen with visuals". Karthik of Milliblog wrote, "Very Thaman... very listenable – good laddu, this!"

Track listing
No.	Title	Lyrics	Singer(s)	Length
1.	"Aasaiye Alai Poley"	Viveka	Ranjith, Rahul Nambiar	04:42
2.	"Love Letter"	Gana Bala	Mukesh Mohamed	02:02
3.	"Hey Unnathan"	Vaali	Suchitra, Ranjith, Rahul Nambiar, Naveen Madhav	04:13
4.	"Birthday"	Vaali	M. L. R. Karthikeyan, Senthil, Sam P. Keerthan	04:29
5.	"Duet Song"	Vaali	Muralidhar, Rahul Nambiar, Ranjith (Interlude by Gana Bala)	04:02
6.	"Potti"	Gana Bala	Gana Bala	02:55
Total length:				21:31

== Release ==
Kanna Laddu Thinna Aasaiya was distributed by Red Giant Movies, who booked nearly 250 screens for the film's release. It was initially scheduled to release on 21 December 2012, but was shifted to 25 January 2013, a day before Indian Republic Day, and later brought forward to 13 January. Prior to the revised date, actor and filmmaker K. Bhagyaraj filed a suit against the makers of Kanna Laddu Thinna Aasaiya, stating that they used the same storyline as his 1981 film Indru Poi Naalai Vaa. He also accused the makers of falsely claiming to have acquired the rights from him. It was later announced that the film, upon orders of the Madras High Court, would acknowledge both Bhagyaraj and his Indru Poi Naalai Vaa story in the credits. Post release, Veer Vasanthakumar, president of the Hindu Mahasabha, objected to a scene where a character dressed as the goddess Amman was making "inappropriate" body movements during a song sequence. Calling it "outrageous", "unacceptable" and "contemptuous", he threatened to file a court case if the scene was not removed.

=== Critical reception ===
Vivek Ramz from In.com rated the film three-and-a-half out of five and stated that "KLTA is a perfect Pongal treat for the family thanks to its clean humour. Go watch it and have a blast!" N. Venkateswaran from The Times of India also gave it three-and-a-half out of five stars, saying, "Manikandan has now carved out a name for himself in the Tamil film industry". Sify gave it three stars writing, "Gags galore, Laughs. This one's strictly for Kollywood junkies whose funny bones are easy to tickle", and called the film a "Jolly fun ride". Malathi Rangarajan of The Hindu said that the film was "a light-hearted fun film for the festive season, if you don't mind the crassness, that is!" and found many similarities to older films with the idea of several men trying to woo a girl already present in the 1971 release Uttharavindri Ulle Vaa. R S Prakash of Bangalore Mirror wrote, "A paper-thin script has been made to made sizzle right from the first frame, thanks to the strength of the film's comedy content".

=== Box office ===
Sify noted that Kanna Laddu Thinna Aasaiya made a profit within three days of its release and called it "2013's first big hit". The trade attributed the film's success to the failure of other films released in the same window. Trade analyst Trinath told IANS in December 2013 that it grossed ₹12 crore (equivalent to ₹20 crore or US$2.1 million in 2023) against a budget of ₹3 crore (equivalent to ₹5.1 crore or US$530,000 in 2023).

== Accolades ==
Date of ceremony	Category	Nominee(s)	Result	Ref.
3rd South Indian International Movie Awards	Best Debutant Producer – Tamil	Handmade Films	Nominated	
3rd South Indian International Movie Awards	Best Comedian – Tamil	Srinivasan	Nominated	
8th Vijay Awards	Best Comedian	Srinivasan	Nominated	
