= Solomon Pappaiah =

Indian scholar and actor (1936–2026)

- Solomon Pappaiah in 2021
- Born: Sundaram Solomon Pappaiah; 22 February 1936; Sathangudi, Madurai, Madras Presidency, British India
- Died: 11 September 2026 (aged 90); Madurai
- Citizenship: India
- Occupations: Scholar; debate moderator; television presenter
- Spouse: S. Jeyabhai
- Children: 2

Solomon Pappaiah (22 February 1936 – 11 September 2026), also known as Solomon Pappiah and Salomon Pappayah, was an Indian scholar, actor, journalist and a television icon in Tamil Nadu. He is best known for moderating debate talk shows, known as 'patti mandrams', which have been airing on Tamil Television Channels for over three decades. He is credited with taking social themes to the masses and he moderated over 12,000 debates programmes across the globe. He is considered one of the greatest Tamil scholars. His modest approach in speaking and life earned him a large reputation among Tamil-speaking people throughout the world. He was awarded India's fourth highest civilian award, the Padma Shri, in 2021.

Pappaiah was known for his 'down to earth' speaking style. His command of Tamil enabled him to get complex literary issues across to the common man. This enabled him to take social themes to the masses and bring about a social awakening in the evolution of Patti Mandrams in Tamil Nadu and beyond.

== Early and personal life ==
Pappaiah was born in Sathangudi, Thirumangalam taluk, Madurai on 22 February 1936, as the ninth of twelve children to A. Sundaram and S. Pakkiam. He had his job cut out as his father was a mill worker and did not have the wherewithal to financially support his studies. With financial help from his friends, he was able to continue his education. Arasu, his drawing master at the American College Higher Secondary School, taught him the skills. Professor Jothi Muthu of American College groomed his love for the language. Pappiah joined Thiagarajar College to pursue post-graduation in Tamil and became the first batch of MA Tamil students. He entered the public stage fray in 1960, while he was a lecturer at The American College. He rose to the position of Head of Department for Tamil in American college and extended his Tamil literature knowledge to all people through various forums. Eventually, he created a social awakening in the evolution of Patti Mandrams. He also wrote and directed plays at college.

Pappaiah resided in Madurai, India, with his wife, Jeyabai, until her death on 12 January 2025. They had a son and a daughter.

Pappaiah died at a private hospital in Madurai, on 11 September 2026, at the age of 90, due to his age-related illness.

== Works ==
=== Writing ===
Pappaiah penned several books:

- Pattukottai Kalyanasundaram: Or Paarvai
- Urai Malargal
- Urai Kothu
- Tirukkural Uraiyudan
- Purananooru Puthiya Varisai Vagai

=== Filmography ===
- Pudhu Varusham (1992)
- Boys (2003)
- Yes Madam (2003)
- Sivaji: The Boss (2007)

== Awards and titles ==
- Referred to as "Tamil Arignar" and "Iyal Kalai Arignar".
- Awarded Kalaimamani by the Government of Tamil Nadu in 2000.
- Annamalai University conferred him with "Muthamizh Perarignar" award in 2010.
- Awarded Padma Shri by the Government of India in 2021.
