= S. Ezhil =

Indian director

- Born: Ezhilmaaran S. 1 February 1964 (age 62); Mayiladuthurai, Tamilnadu, India
- Other name: Ezhil
- Occupation: Film director
- Years active: 1999-present

Ezhilmaaran S. is an Indian film director who works in the Tamil film industry. He made his directorial debut with the 1999 romance film Thullatha Manamum Thullum. His success streak continued with Pennin Manathai Thottu (2000), Poovellam Un Vasam (2001) and Deepavali (2007). He made a comeback in 2012 after a brief sabbatical with Manam Kothi Paravai which opened to moderate reviews from critics but was a commercial hit. He has won two Tamil Nadu state awards. Film Directors Suseenthiran and Karu Pazhaniappan were his assistants.

== Career ==
=== 1999-2007: Romance films and initial success ===
Ezhil made his debut as a filmmaker with Thullatha Manamum Thullum at R. B. Choudary's production house. The film features Vijay and Simran in the lead roles. Prior to release, the role of Vijay's mother in the film was kept under wraps with the media speculating who would play the role. Eventually, no actress played the role, although the character played a pivotal part in the film. Vijay took a pay cut for the film, accepting only 3 million rupees instead of 5 million rupees, as he had signed the film before the release of his blockbuster Kadhalukku Mariyadhai (1997). Initially, Ezhil wanted comedian Vadivelu to play the lead role. Vadivelu, who was impressed with the story, told Ezhil that the storyline was too good and he did not know whether it will work with him in the lead. Vadivelu also asked Ezhil to wait for six months, and if the latter did not get anyone else as the hero, then Vadivelu will act in it. Vadivelu was then was replaced by Vijay. The film went on to become a blockbuster, running for 100 days across dozens of theatres in Tamil Nadu, while it also enjoyed similar success in the neighboring state of Kerala.

Vijay and Ezhil immediately decided to follow up this film with another collaboration, Pennin Manathai Thottu, with either Isha Koppikar or Roja to be hired as the lead actress. However, soon after pre-production, Vijay was replaced by Prabhu Deva and the film went on to release in 2000. Like Thullatha Manamum Thullum, it also became a success.

Ajith Kumar signed the film Poovellam Un Vasam in early 2001 after he pulled out of Praveen Gandhi's commercial film Star. The producers had initially approached Simran, Aishwarya Rai and then Preity Zinta to star, with their refusals leading to the casting of Jyothika. Miss World 2001, Yukta Mookhey was hired to appear in an item number. Ajith gained mass image before the filming so producer Ravichandran expressed his doubts to Ezhil about carrying on with such a family oriented film with an action hero like Ajith in hand. But Ezhil was confident about Ajith's capabilities in pulling off varying roles. The film opened to positive reviews with The Hindu critic labelling it as "reasonably interesting", with Ajith's performance being praised as "Ajith is natural and neat" with claims that "he has to work harder on his soliloquies and sad expressions". The success of the film prompted Ezhil, Ajith Kumar and Jyothika to team up for a venture the following year with Raja.

In 2005, Ezhil directed Amudhae, which received mixed reviews. His 2007 film Deepavali, however, received positive reviews and became a success.

=== 2012-present: Rural comedy films ===
In 2012, Ezhil made a comeback after a brief sabbatical with Manam Kothi Paravai. When his friends, producer Ambeth Kumar and Ranjeev Menon, asked him how the film's shooting was proceeding, he made them listen to the film's songs by D. Imman. Impressed, they decided to produce it. It was initially expected that Yuvan Shankar Raja, whom Ezhil had worked with in Deepavali, would compose the music, but as the budget of this film could not afford to have Yuvan as the music composer, Ezhil opted for Imman. After the lead role in Marina and an important role in 3, Sivakarthikeyan is taking up a full-fledged lead role again for Manam Kothi Paravai. The film, which is set in a village, has been shot at Ezhil's native place Kayathur, near Mayiladuthurai (erstwhile Mayavaram) and Siva Karthikeyan's Thiruvizhimizhalai.

After a fairly successful outing with Manam Kothi Paravai, Ezhil started his next film titled Desingu Raja, which was in a similar genre rural comedy. He hired Vimal to play the lead Idhayakani, who has been named so by his parents and is a diehard MGR fan. Bindu Madhavi was signed to play the female lead as a Rajinikanth fanatic in the movie, thus pairing with Vimal for the second time after Kedi Billa Killadi Ranga. She said "I play a cheerful, naughty village girl". Muktha Bhanu danced for one song along with Vimal and the group dancers which was shot in Thiruvarur. In 2014, Ezhil directed Vellaikaara Durai, which received mixed reviews but was a hit at the box office. His 2016 film Velainu Vandhutta Vellaikaaran was a commercial success. 2017 saw him directing Udhayanidhi Stalin in Saravanan Irukka Bayamaen. In 2022, Ezhil directed Yutha Satham starring R. Parthiban and Gautham Karthik in lead roles. Then, actor Vimal and director Ezhil have reunited for Desingu Raja 2, a sequel to the duo's 2013 hit comedy, Desingu Raja. The film was released in July 2025 to negative reviews.

== Filmography ==
=== As a film director ===
Year	Film	Notes	Ref.
1999	Thullatha Manamum Thullum	Tamil Nadu State Film Award for Best Film (Second Prize)	
2000	Pennin Manathai Thottu		
2001	Poovellam Un Vasam	Tamil Nadu State Film Award for Best Family Film (Second Prize)	
2002	Raja		
2005	Amudhae		
2007	Deepavali		
2012	Manam Kothi Paravai	Also producer	
2013	Desingu Raja		
2014	Vellaikaara Durai		
2016	Velainu Vandhutta Vellaikaaran	Also producer	
2017	Saravanan Irukka Bayamaen		
2022	Yutha Satham		
2025	Desingu Raja 2		
2026	Aayiram Jenmangal		

=== As actor ===
- Manikkam (1996) - flower seller
- Anjala (2016)

=== Frequent collaborators ===
Collaborator	Thullatha Manamum Thullum; (1999)	Pennin Manathai Thottu; (2000)	Poovellam Un Vasam; (2001)	Raja; (2002)	Amudhae; (2005)	Deepavali; (2007)	Manam Kothi Paravai; (2012)	Desingu Raja; (2013)	Vellaikaara Durai; (2014)	Velainu Vandhutta Vellaikaaran; (2016)	Saravanan Irukka Bayamaen; (2017)	Yutha Satham; (2022)	Desingu Raja 2; (2025)
D. Imman							Yes	Yes	Yes		Yes	Yes	
Soori						Yes	Yes	Yes	Yes	Yes	Yes		
Robo Shankar						Yes				Yes	Yes (special appearance)	Yes	Yes
Swaminathan			Yes		Yes			Yes		Yes			Yes
Ravi Mariya							Yes	Yes		Yes	Yes (special appearance)		Yes
Vaiyapuri	Yes	Yes	Yes	Yes		Yes			Yes	Yes		Yes	Yes
Madhan Bob	Yes	Yes	Yes	Yes					Yes		Yes		
Chaams							Yes	Yes			Yes	Yes	Yes
Mahanadi Shankar	Yes	Yes				Yes			Yes		Yes		
Krishnamoorthy	Yes	Yes		Yes	Yes	Yes				Yes			
Bava Lakshmanan		Yes		Yes	Yes			Yes	Yes	Yes		Yes	Yes
