= Saravanan Irukka Bayamaen =

- Theatrical release poster
- Directed by: S. Ezhil
- Written by: S. Ezhil; Ezhichur Aravindan (dialogues)
- Produced by: Udhayanidhi Stalin
- Starring: Udhayanidhi Stalin; Regina Cassandra; Srushti Dange; Soori
- Cinematography: K. G. Venkatesh
- Edited by: Gopi Krishna
- Music by: D. Imman
- Production company: Red Giant Movies
- Distributed by: Red Giant Movies
- Release date: 12 May 2017
- Running time: 130 minutes
- Country: India
- Language: Tamil

Saravanan Irukka Bayamaen (transl. Why fear when Saravanan is here?) is a 2017 Indian Tamil-language supernatural comedy horror film written and directed by S. Ezhil, and produced by Udhayanidhi Stalin. The film stars Udhayanidhi and Regina Cassandra, with Soori and Srushti Dange in supporting roles. It was released on 12 May 2017, and became a box office failure.

== Plot ==
Saravanan is a jobless youth who roams around in a two-wheeler with his friends. Kalyanam decides to be the head of a famous political party called Dho Jindhagi. However, when a drunk photographer incorrectly takes some photos, Kalyanam is targeted by the police. With the help of Saravanan, he goes to Dubai, and it is eventually revealed that Kalyanam had to take care of camels in Dubai. After Kalyanam leaves for Dubai, Saravanan's friends overexaggerate about Saravanan to the head of Dho Jindhagi, who appoints Saravanan as head. Two years later, Saravanan's other uncle and their family come to visit. Saravanan's cousin Thenmozhi also comes and demands his house (which is now a party office) to be cleaned before she comes. It is revealed that Saravanan and Thenmozhi were schoolmates and were always fighting, until Thenmozhi left town. Saravanan does not have any other place to start the party office as he had earlier used Thenmozhi's house for that purpose and Kalyanam's wife gives their new house to him without Kalyanam's knowledge, and when he arrives, he is shocked. He takes Saravanan to be his enemy, and along with Thenmozhi, plans to take revenge. Various hilarious situations are witnessed, and meanwhile, Thenmozhi gets engaged to Veerasingam's son Rajadurai, who is somewhat immature. This hurts Saravanan, who had fallen in love with Thenmozhi. In many incidents, Thenmozhi is seen to act supportive to Saravanan though she hates him, shocking others. It is later revealed that she is possessed by the ghost of Fathima, a Muslim girl who was in love with Saravanan but had died due to an accident. Saravanan enjoys life with Thenmozhi as Fathima. But when the family learns about this, they get angry on Saravanan for cheating them. What Saravanan does to reunite with Thenmozhi by convincing his family and breaking her marriage with Rajadurai, forms the crux of the story.

== Cast ==
- Udhayanidhi Stalin as Saravanan
- Regina Cassandra as Thenmozhi
- Srushti Dange as Fathima
- Soori as Kalyanam
- Jangiri Madhumitha as Saraswathy; Kalyanam's wife
- Rajasekar as Saravanan's father
- Anjali Varadharajan as Saravanan's mother
- Mansoor Ali Khan as Veerasingam
- Livingston as Selvam, Thenmozhi's father
- Nithya Ravindran as Thenmozhi's mother
- Chaams as Rajadurai, Veerasingam's son
- Yogi Babu as Babu, Saravanan's friend
- Ashvin Raja as Saravanan's friend
- Joe Malloori as Fathima's father
- Rethika Srinivas as Fathima's mother
- Manobala as Swamy
- Madhan Bob as Curtain Sharma
- Thadi Balaji as Moorthy
- G. M. Kumar as Veerasingam's father-in-law
- Saravana Subbiah as Police Officer
- George Maryan as Police Officer
- Madhan Pandian as Kalyanam's cousin
- Mahanadi Shankar
- Sumathi G. as Nagalakshmi
- Prema Priya as Pechiammal
- Kothandam as Photographer
- Mohamed Kuraishi as Saravanan's friend
- Bava Lakshmanan as Veerasingam's henchman
- Risha Jacobs as Jignashree
- Lollu Uthayakumar
- Sakthi
- Anusree (cameo appearance)
- Robo Shankar as Saudaswaran (guest appearance)
- Ravi Mariya as Maudeswaran (guest appearance)

== Production ==
In July 2016, Udhayanidhi Stalin revealed that he would produce and act in a new comedy to be directed by S. Ezhil, whose previous was Velainu Vandhutta Vellaikaaran.

== Soundtrack ==
Saravanan Irukka Bayamaen

Soundtrack album to Saravanan Irukka Bayamaen by D. Imman
- Released: 2017
- Genre: Feature film soundtrack
- Language: Tamil
- Label: Sony Music India
- Producer: D. Imman

D. Imman chronology
Bogan (2017)	Saravanan Irukka Bayamaen (2017)	Adhagappattathu Magajanangalay (2017)

The soundtrack was composed by D. Imman, collaborating with Ezhil for the fourth time after Manam Kothi Paravai, Desingu Raja, and Vellaikaara Durai. All lyrics were written by Yugabharathi.

All lyrics are written by Yugabharathi.

Track listing
No.	Title	Singer(s)	Length
1.	"Yembuttu Irukkuthu Aasai"	Sean Roldan, Kalyani Nair
2.	"Semma Joru"	Vishal Dadlani, Maria Kavita Thomas
3.	"Marhaba Aavona"	Shreya Ghoshal, Aditya Gadhvi
4.	"Langu Langu"	Praniti
5.	"Lala Kadai Santhi"	Benny Dayal, Sunidhi Chauhan
6.	"Melancholic Ride" (Instrumental theme)	–
7.	"Yembuttu Irukkuthu Aasai" (Karaoke version)	–
8.	"Marhaba Aavona" (Karaoke version)	–
9.	"Lala Kadai Santhi" (Karaoke version)	–

== Reception ==
Manoj Kumar R of The Indian Express wrote, "Neither the comedy nor the horror part of the film worth is your time and money. Do yourself a favour, sit this one out". Chitradeepa Anantharam of The Hindu wrote that the film "has all the elements of a mass entertainer - comedy, love, horror and action. But none of it works in the film. The comedy is crass, the horror makes you squirm, love is non-existent and the action is terrible". Karthik Kumar of Hindustan Times wrote, "Despite having a battalion of comedians at his disposal, the jokes in [Ezhil's] film just don’t work". Chennai Vision wrote, "The film is a comedy caper that tickles our funny bone with a wafer-thin storyline. It seems it’s time that Ezhil tries something new, as we are so used to his style of films". Anupama Subramanian of Deccan Chronicle wrote that it is a "hackneyed commercial potboiler" which has "lackluster writing", making it "enjoyable only in parts". M Suganth of The Times of India wrote, "Touted to be a slapstick comedy, the film tends to take an unexpected spooky route from here, because of which the wafer-thin plot becomes irritating; otherwise, the film would at least have been watchable".
