= Singampuli =

Indian actor and director (born 1968)

- Born: 6 July 1968 (age 58); Periyakulam, Tamil Nadu, India
- Other name: Ram Sathya
- Occupations: Actor, director
- Years active: 1997–present
- Spouse: Pushpavalli
- Children: 2

Singampuli is an Indian actor and director working in Tamil films. After making Red (2002) and Maayavi (2005), he has made a career appearing in comedy roles and supporting roles.

== Career ==
Singampuli was born and brought up in Theni, Periyakulam and after studying engineering in Bangalore, he arrived in Chennai looking for a career in films. During his stint as an assistant director with Sundar C, Singampuli suggested the original plot point of Unnai Thedi (1999) to the director and Sundar wrote the script of the film within a week, before discussing the line with actor Ajith Kumar. Ajith was initially unimpressed but agreed to do the romantic story anyway, mentioning that if the film became a success he would feature in a future film to be directed by Singampuli. Subsequently, he agreed terms to work in the 2002 action film Red, a story telling the tale of a Madurai-based revolutionary. The film opened to mixed reviews upon release and eventually the film had an average run at the box office but went on to gain cult status among ajith fans after some years. In 2005, he made the kidnap comedy film Maayavi featuring Suriya and Jyothika, winning acclaim for his work.

Director Bala cast him in an acting role as a beggar in Naan Kadavul (2009) and since Singampuli has appeared in several films in supporting roles.

Singampuli bagged the Best Comedian Award for his role in Anjukku Onnu (2016).

He has acted and collaborated with directors Rasu Madhuravan's drama films Mayandi Kudumbathar (2009), Goripalayam (2010), Muthukku Muthaaga (2011) and Pandi Oliperukki Nilayam (2012) followed by Ezhil's comedy films Manam Kothi Paravai (2012), Desingu Raja (2013), Vellaikaara Durai (2014) and Desingu Raja 2 (2025).

In 2024, he gives a noteworthy performance in the action thriller Maharaja. The film emerged as a massive hit at the box office.

Singampuli's foray into acting marked a new chapter in his career.

In 2025, he starred in the Tamil web series Seruppugal Jaakirathai which streamed on ZEE5. He played the lead role of Thyagarajan, a mild-mannered auditor who accidentally gets entangled in a criminal plot involving a stolen diamond hidden in a pair of shoes. His performance, blending humor and earnestness, received positive responses from audiences and marked his notable foray into the digital streaming space.

== Family ==
The actor's family includes his wife, Pushpavalli, an Indian Colonel Army officer. Together, they have two sons, Savith Annavi aged 18 and Tirunaa Annavi aged 17.

== Filmography ==
=== As film director ===
Year	Title	Notes			
Year	Title	Notes	2002	Red	Credited as Ram Sathya
2005	Maayavi				

=== As writer ===
Year	Title	Credited as	Notes
Year	Title	Writer	Notes
2000	Kannan Varuvaan	Story, dialogue	Credited as D. Singapuli
2004	Perazhagan	Dialogue	Credited as D. P. Singappuli
2009	Renigunta	Dialogue	
2010	Virunthali	Dialogue	

=== As assistant director ===
Year	Film	Notes
1999	Unakkaga Ellam Unakkaga	
2002	Raja	
2003	Anjaneya	

=== As actor ===
List of film acting credits
Year	Title	Role	Notes
1997	Janakiraman	Anandraj's henchman	Uncredited
2000	Kannan Varuvaan	Radharavi's henchman	Uncredited
2009	Naan Kadavul	Kuyyan	Uncredited
2009	Mayandi Kudumbathar	Mayandi Virumandi	Won, Ananda Vikatan Cinema Award for Best comedian
2009	Eesa	Kadukkai	
2010	Goripalayam	M. G. R. Chinnasamy	
2010	Milaga	Azhagar's friend	
2010	Virunthali	Oli Shankar	
2011	Thoonga Nagaram	Special appearance	
2011	Nandhi	Selvaraj	
2011	Muthukku Muthaaga	Suruttu	
2011	Eththan	Veerasingam	
2011	Padhinettan Kudi Ellai Arambam		
2011	Sankarankovil		
2012	Sengathu Bhoomiyilae	Ondippuli	
2012	Aravaan		
2012	Manam Kothi Paravai	Modu Mutti	
2012	Pandi Oliperukki Nilayam	Pandi's brother	
2012	Akilan	Mani	
2013	Kadal	Clarence	
2013	Unakku 20 Enakku 40		
2013	Oruvar Meethu Iruvar Sainthu		
2013	Desingu Raja	Koushik	
2013	Naiyaandi		
2013	Jannal Oram	Tiyagi Thillai	
2013	Ragalaipuram	Constable	
2014	Vadakkum Therkum		
2014	Oru Oorla Rendu Raja		
2014	Kaaviya Thalaivan	Palavesam	
2014	Pappali	Councillor	
2014	Sandiyar		
2014	Aindhaam Thalaimurai Sidha Vaidhiya Sigamani	Vijay Sethupathi	
2014	Sigaram Thodu	Pickpocket	
2014	Kaadu	MaduraiKaaran	
2014	Appuchi Gramam	Govinda	
2014	Vellaikaara Durai	Balu dasan	
2015	Pongi Ezhu Manohara	Mani	
2015	Sandamarutham	Mayilu	
2015	Kallappadam	Singampuli	
2015	Sagaptham	Tiger	
2015	Demonte Colony	Producer	Guest appearance
2015	Naalu Policeum Nalla Irundha Oorum	Padhinettampadiyan	
2015	Vanna Jigina		
2015	Pokkiri Mannan	Kali	
2015	9 Thirudargal		
2016	Karaioram	"Vettukili" Karunakaran	Uncredited
2016	Sethu Boomi		
2016	Sowkarpettai	Puli	
2016	Hello Naan Pei Pesuren	Game Samiyar	
2016	Kida Poosari Magudi		
2016	Yokkiyan Varan Somba Thooki Ulla Vai		
2016	Guhan		
2016	Saalaiyoram		
2016	Velainu Vandhutta Vellaikaaran		
2016	Pandiyoda Galatta Thaangala	An Aspiring actor	
2016	Muthina Kathirika	Vanjinathan	
2016	Ka Ka Ka Po		
2016	Aandavan Kattalai	Murugesan	
2016	Anjukku Onnu		Won, Tamil Nadu State Film Award for Best Comedian
2016	Kadavul Irukaan Kumaru	Madaswamy	
2017	Koditta Idangalai Nirappuga		
2017	Muthuramalingam	Mookkaiyya Thevar's nephew	
2017	Yaakkai	Muniyappan	
2017	Ayyanar Veethi		
2017	Yentha Nerathilum		
2017	Puyala Kelambi Varom		
2017	Karuppan	Karuppan's Uncle	
2017	En Aaloda Seruppa Kaanom	Soosai	
2017	Aangila Padam	Iruttu Pusari	
2018	Mannar Vagaiyara	Puli Moota	
2018	Saranalayam		
2018	Padaiveeran	Bartender	
2018	Yemaali	Selvaraj	
2018	Kalakalappu 2	Seenu's assistant	
2018	Merlin		
2018	Pakka		
2018	Alaipesi		
2018	Enna Thavam Seitheno		
2018	Maniyaar Kudumbam		
2018	Azhagumagan		
2018	Genius	Ramamoorthy's friend	
2018	Evanukku Engeyo Matcham Irukku	Giri	
2019	Kadhal Munnetra Kazhagam	Kottaisaamy	
2019	Ganesha Meendum Santhipom	Paandi	
2019	Thavam	Caterer	
2020	Thottu Vidum Thooram		
2020	Psycho	Rajanayakam	
2020	Irandam Kuththu	Priya's father	
2020	Naanga Romba Busy	Constable Naidu	
2021	Pulikkuthi Pandi	Pandi's uncle	
2021	Sulthan	Villager	
2021	Pei Mama		
2021	MGR Magan	M. G. Karuppusamy	
2021	Raajavamsam	Singampuli	
2021	Anandham Vilayadum Veedu	Sakkarapandi	
2022	Don	Kandhan	
2022	Panni Kutty	Temple priest	
2022	The Legend	VJ's Assistant	
2022	My Dear Lisa	Chef cook	
2022	Viruman	Thalaiyaari	
2022	Kanmani Paappa	Kokki Kumar	
2022	Pattathu Arasan	Kannan	
2022	Powder		
2022	DSP	Uppiliyappan	
2023	Kathar Basha Endra Muthuramalingam	Head Constable	
2023	Azhagiya Kanne		
2023	Kabadi Bro	Argent Muthu	
2023	Naadu		
2023	Va Varalam Va		
2023	Thee Ivan	Vinayagam	
2023	Moothakudi		
2024	Local Sarakku	Agent Thangaraj	
2024	Aranmanai 4	Constable A. Sakthivel	
2024	Haraa		
2024	Maharaja	Nallasivam	
2024	Udhir @ Poomara Kathu		
2024	Kadaisi Ulaga Por	Perumal	
2025	Baby and Baby	Singampuli	
2025	Fire		
2025	Konjam Kadhal Konjam Modhal	Santhanam	
2025	Enai Sudum Pani	Mama	
2025	Retro	Rukmini’s father	
2025	Desingu Raja 2	Arjun	
2025	Mr Zoo Keeper		
2025	Bomb		
2025	Kambi Katna Kathai		
2025	Thuchchaadhanan		
2025	Cristina Kathirvelan		
2025	Indian Penal Law		
2025	Konja Naal Poru Thalaiva		
2026	Granny	Constable A. Susaiyappar	
2026	Mylanji	Gulam Ali	
2026	Thaai Kizhavi	Uppiliyaan	
2026	Parimala and Co	Kamatchi	
2026	Mookuthi Amman 2	Constable	

=== As dubbing artist ===
Year	Film	Role	Notes
2019	The Lion King	Timon	Tamil version
2024	Mufasa: The Lion King	Timon	Tamil version

=== Television ===
Year	Title	Role	Network	Notes	Ref.
2023	Ayali		ZEE5	Streaming television series	
2024–present	Top Cooku Dupe Cooku	Contestant	Sun TV	Reality show	
2025	Seruppugal Jaakirathai	Thiyagarajan	ZEE5	Streaming television series	
