= Poovellam Un Vaasam =

2001 film directed by Ezhil

- Poster
- Directed by: S. Ezhil
- Written by: S. Ezhil; Na.Anbharasu (uncredited)
- Produced by: V. Ravichandran
- Starring: Ajith Kumar; Jyothika
- Cinematography: Arthur A. Wilson
- Edited by: A. Sreekar Prasad
- Music by: Vidyasagar
- Production company: Oscar Films
- Release date: 17 August 2001
- Running time: 158 minutes
- Country: India
- Language: Tamil

Poovellam Un Vaasam (transl. All flowers bear your fragrance) is a 2001 Indian Tamil-language drama film written and directed by S. Ezhil and produced by V. Ravichandran. It stars Ajith Kumar and Jyothika as childhood friends, alongside an ensemble supporting cast of Nagesh, Sivakumar, Sayaji Shinde, Vivek, Yugendran, and Kovai Sarala.

Poovellam Un Vaasam was released on 17 August 2001. It received positive reviews and became a commercial success.

== Plot ==
Two families stay in identical bungalows, adjacent to each other, tracing their friendship to over 40 years. Their respective progenies Chinna and Chella are childhood friends, their easy camaraderie and strong bonding carried over to their adult years. The two of them study in the same college, same class, zoom together on the motorbike, their togetherness at home and college, as accepted a fact as it was in films like Piriyadha Varam Vendum (2001). Somewhere along the way, the duo falls in love, throwing some soft glances at each other when the other is not looking.

Their college mate Karna, makes devious plans to separate the duo and make Chella his. He does not seem to have any running feud with Chinna, is quite friendly with the duo, and does not seem to be particularly in love with Chella. Chinna laps up all that Karna tells him about Chella loving him, and is heartbroken and goes out on a business trip. Chella, persuaded by both families to marry a NRI, boldly informs them that she loved Chinna and would marry him. The two families are happy.

Chinna returns home and learns of the preparation for his engagement ceremony. Feeling that since Chella loved Karna, it must be family pressure that must have forced her to agree. Chinna then backs out. It is Chella's turn to be indignant about Chinna's mistrust of her love, and after giving him a piece of her mind, she backs out, with Chinna pleading for acceptance. After a period of separation, during which all ties between the two families are severed, both soon come to realise that they cannot live without their dearest friends and lovers. Chinna and Chella then reunite with their families.

== Cast ==
- Ajith Kumar as Chinna
- Jyothika as Chella
- Sivakumar as Arunachalam, Chinna's father
- Janaki Sabesh as Janaki, Chinna's mother
- Nagesh as Murugesan, Chinna's grandfather
- Sayaji Shinde as Rajasekar, as Chella's father
- Jaya Murali as Narmada, Chella's mother
- V. S. Raghavan as Chinnasamy, Chella's grandfather
- Sukumari as Chella's grandmother
- Vivek as Varathan
- Yugendran as Karna
- Kovai Sarala as Kanniga
- Vaiyapuri as Durai
- Sona Heiden as Anitha
- Madhan Bob as Chella's family friend
- S. N. Lakshmi as Durai's grandmother
- Swaminathan as Saamy, cook
- Ilavarasu as Pandi, laundry owner
- Mayilswamy as a guest at Anitha's wedding
- Lavanya as Chinna's sister
- Prabhakaran Chandran "Prabhu" as Diwakar "Diwa", Chella's brother
- Mathiazhagan as a college professor
- Yukta Mookhey special appearance as herself in the song "Yukta Mookhey"
- Ezhil special appearance in the song "Yukta Mookhey"
- Raju Sundaram special appearance in the song "Yukta Mookhey"

== Production ==
Ajith Kumar signed the film in early 2001 after pulling out of Praveenkanth's Star. The producers initially approached Aishwarya Rai and then Preity Zinta to star, with their refusals leading to the casting of Jyothika. Miss World 1999, Yukta Mookhey was chosen to appear in an item number. Before filming began, Ajith became popular as an action hero due to films like Amarkkalam, Dheena and Citizen, so producer Ravichandran expressed his doubts to Ezhil about continuing a family-oriented film with an action hero like Ajith. But Ezhil was confident about Ajith's capabilities in pulling off varying roles.

Twin bungalows were erected in Prasad Studios for the film by art director Prabhakaran as the director could not locate a twin bungalow in the same compound. One house was built to feature antiques and the other with modern artefacts and computers. It took seventy five days to complete the set with the help of six hundred people. During the making of the film, Ajith was admitted to a Chennai city hospital for a surgery of his backbone causing a month's delay in the film's release.

== Soundtrack ==
The soundtrack was composed by Vidyasagar, with lyrics by Vairamuthu. The song "Kaadhal Vandhadhum" is set in Kapi raga. Vidyasagar reused the tune later in Telugu as "Pannendintiki Padukkonte", for the 2002 Telugu film Neetho.

Track listing
No.	Title	Singer(s)	Length
1.	"Kaadhal Vandhadhum"	K. J. Yesudas, Sadhana Sargam	5:35
2.	"Pudhu Malar Thottu"	Sriram Parthasarathy	4:42
3.	"Thirumana Malargal"	Swarnalatha	6:14
4.	"Thalaattum Kaatre"	Shankar Mahadevan	5:25
5.	"Chella Namm Veettukku"	Malaysia Vasudevan, Sujatha Mohan, Harish Raghavendra, Sangeetha Sajith	4:51
6.	"Yukthaamukhi"	Devan, Clinton Cerejo	5:37
Total length:			32:24

== Release and reception ==
Poovellam Un Vaasam was released on 17 August 2001. A critic from The Hindu labelled it as "reasonably interesting", with Ajith's performance being praised as "natural and neat". Visual Dasan of Kalki, playing on the film's title, said "Poovellam Serial Vaasam" (the flowers bear the smell of serials). Rajitha of Rediff.com wrote, "Trouble is the story/script/screenplay which, in a word, is insipid. To the point where, when the movie crescendoes with the two once-close families splitting amidst high drama, you put a polite hand up to stifle a yawn". The success of the film prompted Ezhil, Ajith and Jyothika to team up for a venture the following year with Raja (2002). K. N. Vijiyan of New Straits Times called it "strictly for Ajith and Jyothika fans". Malini Mannath of Chennai Online wrote "No effort has been spared to make it a lavish production. The songs are pleasantly picturised, with Arthur Wilson's camera capturing the richness of the sets and the colourful ambience. But what is lacking is a clear script and freshness in narration".

== Accolades ==
Poovellam Un Vaasam won the Tamil Nadu State Film Award for Second Best Family Film and Ajith won a special prize from the committee. At the same ceremony, Sai won Best Costume Designer, Prabhakaran won Best Art Director, Kovai Sarala won Best Comedian and Vidyasagar won Best Music Director. Jyothika won the Cinema Express Award for Best Actress – Tamil, which was given to her by Ajith at the Cinema Express Awards. Ajith was nominated for the Filmfare Award for Best Actor – Tamil, and Jyothika for Best Actress – Tamil.
