= Vellaikaara Durai =

2014 Indian film by S. Ezhil

- Theatrical release poster
- Directed by: S. Ezhil
- Written by: S. Ezhil
- Produced by: G. N. Anbu Chezhiyan
- Starring: Vikram Prabhu; Sri Divya; Soori; John Vijay
- Cinematography: Sooraj Nallusami
- Edited by: Kishore Te
- Music by: D. Imman
- Production company: Gopuram Films
- Release date: 25 December 2014
- Country: India
- Language: Tamil

Vellakkaara Durai (transl. Durai, the white) is a 2014 Indian Tamil-language romantic comedy film written and directed by S. Ezhil, and produced by G. N. Anbu Chezhiyan. The film stars Vikram Prabhu, Sri Divya, Soori, and John Vijay. It was released on 25 December 2014.

== Plot ==
Police Pandi, the owner of a real estate agency, borrows 15 lakhs from Vatti Varadhan, a local rowdy and don, to start his business. Murugan is Pandi's assistant, and he gives the media an advertisement in which he persuades people to buy land from 'his' company, making many people persuaded from it. A billionaire wants to buy all the land, and when he is about to sign the papers, they find out that the land is actually a graveyard, causing the billionaire to not buy the land. When Pandi and Murugan are in a bar drinking alcohol, a call comes on Pandi's phone. Murugan answers it, thinking that it was the broker who sold them the land, but it was actually Varadhan. Murugan talks to Varadhan in foul language, and when he ends the call, Pandi tells him that it was actually Varadhan. He then goes to another table and asks a man for some booze. The whole group befriends the man, who is mute.

The next morning, they find themselves in Varadhan's house, where it is just like jail. There are many people who work there because they could not give back the money they borrowed. They all end up working there, except for Murugan, who saved Varadhan when a few men tried to kill him, causing him to become his supervisor. One day, a worker in there gets to go home, revealing to the others that 'Chinnamma' lets some people go. When Murugan inquires about her to Pandi, he tells him that she is Varadhan's sister. Murugan then goes to her room and threatens her to let them go as well, but when he sees 'Chinnamma', whose real name is Yamuna, Murugan immediately falls for her and starts wooing her, but she does not accept him. One day, Varadhan arranges for his engagement, and Murugan and Pandi start arranging everything. When the Aiyer Swamiji asks them to bring the bride, Murugan gets shocked seeing Yamuna as the bride. When Pandi asks Varadhan's servants why they brought Varadhan's sister, they revealed that she is not his sister and is the woman that he has been waiting to marry. Murugan drinks booze after hearing this but then sees Yamuna escaping. Yamuna and Murugan get on a lorry, and Yamuna reveals why she escaped.

Yamuna's mother died when she was five years old, and her father Manickam looked after her. Manickam takes care of the people's problems, considers them as his own, and helps them. He promises the men that he will give Varadhan the money they borrowed, and helps them. One day, Manickam dies, and no one helps Yamuna give Varadhan the money that Manickam promised to give. Varadhan gives her an idea by saying that if she marries him, she will not need to give the money, so Yamuna reluctantly agrees. Murugan then asks if she needs any help, but Yamuna refuses, and they separate. Somehow, Varadhan finds them and hits Murugan unconscious. He forcefully takes Yamuna with him and arranges their marriage. However, the man who is unable to speak, later revealed to be a terrorist, dies, and their marriage stops. Yamuna sees Murugan, hugs him, and asks him to kill Varadhan and stop the marriage. Murugan agrees and plans to kill him, but everything does not go according to plan. Murugan and Pandi stop the wedding by saying that there is a bomb attached to Pandi and it will explode. Some terrorists kidnap Varadhan. It turns out that the bomb on Pandi isn't a dummy one but the real thing. Everyone escapes the house except Pandi. Yamuna and Murugan are united together by quarrelling. In the end, the bomb explodes and Pandi is launched up like a rocket.

== Cast ==
- Vikram Prabhu as Murugan
- Sri Divya as Yamuna, 'Chinnamma'
- Soori as Police Pandi
- John Vijay as Vatti Varadhan
- M. S. Bhaskar as Mahadevan, Murugan's father
- Vanitha Krishnachandran as Murugan's mother
- Vanitha Hariharan as Murugan's Sister
- Aadukalam Naren as Police
- Rajendran as Rajendran
- Vaiyapuri as Land Broker
- Madhan Bob as Malaysia Madhavan
- Singampuli as Balu Dasan
- Manobala
- Namo Narayana
- Singamuthu
- Jangiri Madhumitha
- Vittal Rao as Varadhan's grandfather
- Myna Nandhini as Pandi's wife
- Bomb Ramesh as Bomb Bala
- Daddy Saravanan as Gopal
- Bava Lakshmanan
- Mahanadi Shankar
- Cool Suresh as Varadhan's henchman
- V. M. Subburaj
- Mippu as Murugan's friend
- Gnanavel as Manickam, Yamuna's father (guest appearance)
- Meenakshi as item number

== Production ==
Sri Divya was cast as the lead actress after the director M. Muthaiya was impressed with her performance in Varuthapadatha Valibar Sangam (2013). Principal photography began on 14 April 2014, and took place in locations including Chennai, Kodaikanal and Thanjavur. The film's title Vellaikaara Durai was announced in June 2014.

== Soundtrack ==
Vellaikaara Durai

Soundtrack album by D. Imman
- Released: 9 December 2014
- Recorded: 2013–2014
- Genre: Feature film soundtrack
- Length: 30.58
- Language: Tamil
- Label: Sony Music India
- Producer: D. Imman

D. Imman chronology
Kayal (2014)	Vellaikaara Durai (2014)	Valiyavan (2015)

Music was composed by D. Imman, collaborating with Ezhil for the third time after Manam Kothi Paravai and Desingu Raja. The soundtrack album was released on 9 December 2014 at Suryan FM. Siddharth K of Sify rated the album 2.5/5 stating "Imman has a forgettable outing".

Track listing
No.	Title	Lyrics	Singer(s)	Length
1.	"Ammadi Un Azhagu"	Yugabharathi	D. Sathya Prakash	4:29
2.	"Kaakkaa Muttai"	Yugabharathi	Vaikom Vijayalakshmi	4:51
3.	"Koodha Kaathu"	Vairamuthu	Haricharan, Shreya Ghoshal	4:55
4.	"Nadigar Thilagam"	Yugabharathi	Krishnamoorthy	4:53
5.	"Ammadi Un Azhagu" (Instrumental)	–	–	4:16
6.	"Koodha Kaathu" (Instrumental)	–	–	4:53
7.	"Brass Band" (Instrumental)	–	Maxwell (Trumpet)	2:37
Total length:				30:54

== Critical reception ==
Vishal Menon of The Hindu wrote, "The film takes a story template and incorporates into it one ridiculous joke after another...To be fair, the film only tries to deliver on what it promises — a laugh riot with all the masala elements to satisfy the B and C centres", with the critic concluding that "Vellaikaara Durai could be the secret pleasure you would never admit to have enjoyed". Sify wrote, "The problem with Vellaikara Durai is that the actors try too hard to be funny but the writing does not offer anything new", going on to call it an "average comedy entertainer which might appeal to audience who never expect logic but only mindless comedies".
