= Raja (2002 film) =

2002 film directed by Ezhil

- Theatrical release poster
- Directed by: S. Ezhil
- Written by: S. Ezhil
- Produced by: Thiruvenkatam
- Starring: Ajith Kumar; Jyothika; Priyanka Trivedi
- Cinematography: Aravind Kamalanathan
- Edited by: Suresh Urs
- Music by: S. A. Rajkumar
- Production company: Serene Movie Makers
- Release date: 5 July 2002
- Running time: 150 minutes
- Country: India
- Language: Tamil

Raja (transl. King) is a 2002 Indian Tamil-language romantic drama film written and directed by S. Ezhil and produced by Thiruvenkatam. The film stars Ajith Kumar, Jyothika and Priyanka Trivedi, while Vadivelu, Radha Ravi, Livingston, Sonu Sood, and Devan play supporting roles. The music was composed by S. A. Rajkumar with cinematography by Aravind Kamalanathan and editing by Suresh Urs. The film was released on 5 July 2002 and performed averagely at the box office.

== Plot ==
Raja is paranoid about getting married. Priya Mahalakshmi arrives at his place, acting as his friend Madhi’s lover. However, the truth comes to light, and upon confrontation, she reveals that her father plans to marry her off, so she ran away from home and needs a place to stay. Raja obliges, and she meets his parents, introducing herself as his lover. Raja’s parents become very happy and plan their marriage, without Raja knowing. On the day of the engagement, Raja becomes infuriated and asks Priya to move out, throwing her bag. A photo gets dislodged, and when Raja sees it, he is shocked; it is Priya, whom he loved.

In a flashback, Raja and Priya attended college together. Raja was a writer, and Priya was his die-hard fan. However, try as she might, she could never seem to meet him. One night, when Raja performs a song on stage, she goes up to him to reveal her feelings. Under the cover of darkness, Priya confesses her love for Raja. When the lights come back on, the other Priya, known as Thayir Saatham, is next to Raja, and he believes she has revealed his love. Priya finds out that Raja is staying as a tenant above Thayir Saatham’s house and uses her to get information about Raja. That way, Thayir Saatham and Raja become close. In a parallel track, Priya’s college mate Bhavani is a rowdy who lusts after her. Raja and Bhavani clash when Raja beats up Bhavani when he refuses to compromise on the love between two people from different colleges. Bhavani loses face and swears revenge. Priya eventually reveals her feelings for Raja to Thayir Saatham, who feels bad and decides to avoid Raja until she can tell him the truth. Raja, thinking she is angry with him for not signing up for a computer class that her father suggested, goes early one morning to sign up. Thayir Saatham goes after him but is caught by Bhavani in a car. Bhavani attempts to rape her, but she manages to lower the window and sees Raja, who chases after the car. Bhavani throws Thayir Saatham out of the car, killing her. Devastated, Raja keeps avoiding the topic of marriage, unable to forget her.

The truth is revealed to everyone. Raja’s father Kathiresan asks him to forget the past and marry Priya, but Raja refuses, and Priya waits for the train to take her back home. The train arrives, and both her father and Bhavani are on it. When Raja sees Bhavani, he gets enraged. After fighting Bhavani’s goons, he boards the train and bashes Bhavani, eventually killing him. Priya and Raja finally unite.

== Cast ==
- Ajith Kumar as Raja
- Jyothika as Priya Mahalakshmi
- Priyanka Trivedi as Priya Mahalakshmi (Thayir Satham)
- Vadivelu as Sappai
- Radha Ravi as Kathiresan, Raja's father
- Livingston as Madhi
- Vaiyapuri as Onan
- Sonu Sood as Bhavani
- Devan as Priya's father
- Jyothi as Raja's mother
- Madhan Bob as Priya Mahalakshmi's father
- Nalini as Priya Mahalakshmi's mother
- Mayilsamy as Drunk passenger
- Theni Kunjarammal as Madhi's grandmother
- Besant Ravi as Sumathi's relative
- Chaplin Balu as Bus passenger
- MLA Thangaraj as Madhi's father
- Krishnamoorthy as Bus owner
- Bava Lakshmanan as Bus owner
- Kottachi as Bus passenger
- Pasi Sathya as Priya's housemaid
- Varalakshmi as Madhi's mother
- Priyanka as Sumathi
- Karnaa Radha
- Vijay Ganesh
- Lollu Sabha Udhayakumar as Manohar
- Mantra in a special appearance in "Vethalaikodiye"

== Production ==
Ezhil, Ajith Kumar and Jyothika reunited for the film following the success of Poovellam Un Vaasam (2001). The makers initially titled the film as Nallathor Kadhal Seivom, before considering Dileep and Jeeva, then finalising Raja. A fight scene was picturised on Ajith, Sonu and 40 stunt-men on a train that travelled from Mettupalayam to Ooty. For the scenes the train was hired for four days at a cost of about ₹40 lakh.

== Soundtrack ==
The music was composed by S. A. Rajkumar in his third collaboration with Ezhil after Thulladha Manamum Thullum (1999) and Pennin Manathai Thottu (2000).

Track listing
No.	Title	Lyrics	Singer(s)	Length
1.	"Chinna Chinna"	Pa. Vijay	Mahalakshmi Iyer, Timmy	5:10
2.	"Karisai Kaattu Pennae"	S. A. Rajkumar	K. S. Chithra, Manikka Vinayagam, Chorus	5:39
3.	"Nee Paakinrai"	Muthu Vijayan	Rajesh Krishnan, S. A. Rajkumar	5:24
4.	"Oru Pouranami"	Kalaikumar	Hariharan, Mahalakshmi Iyer	5:34
5.	"Singari Singari"	Pa. Vijay	Karthik	3:01
6.	"Vethalaikodiye"	Kalaikumar	Karthik, Krishnaraj	5:12
Total length:				30:00

== Reception ==
Sify wrote "The film is out to wallop some fun, frolic and romance. The chemistry between the hi-energy Ajit and the soft-spoken ?apaavi? character of Priyanka Trivedi is laugh rising, but the plot subsequently degenerates into a farce". Malathi Rangarajan of The Hindu wrote "Ezhil is known for his decency in storyline and plausibility in direction. On these two fronts he does not disappoint much — it is the screenplay that seems wanting" and concluded "Raja"s recipe for success seems perfect — though the same cannot be said of the execution". Visual Dasan of Kalki wrote the makers have mixed light humour with an uncomplicated screenplay. Even though humour runs with the story but many of the scenes has smell of stale rice.

Cinesouth wrote "Director Ezhil has chosen a very mediocre plot and with a super mediocre screenplay, he has pushed 'Raja' to the depths of oblivion". Malini Mannath of Chennai Online wrote "In his earlier films Ajit played the lover-boy and then switched over to action and 'rowdy' roles in his recent films. That didn't work out either, and with 'Raja' Ajit is back to the college-campus and romance. But if the script is uninspiring and mediocre, and the narration lackadaisical, there's not much a hero can do, whether he's playing a lover-boy or a rowdy!".
