= Oviyavai Vitta Yaru =

2019 Indian comedy film by Rajadurai

- Directed by: Rajadurai
- Produced by: Madurai Selvam
- Starring: Sanjeevi; Oviya
- Cinematography: E.K. Nagarajan
- Edited by: P. Sai Suresh
- Music by: Srikanth Deva
- Production company: Velammal Cine Talkies
- Release date: 24 May 2019
- Country: India
- Language: Tamil

Oviyavai Vitta Yaru Seeni (transl. Seeni, if not Oviya, then who?) is a 2019 Indian Tamil-language comedy film directed by Rajadurai and produced by Madurai Selvam. It stars Sanjeevi and Oviya. The film was renamed after the lead actress following her new-found popularity after her appearance in the reality television show Bigg Boss. Featuring music composed by Srikanth Deva with lyrics by Vairamuthu and Snehan, the film began production in mid-2014 was released in May 2019.

== Cast ==
- Sanjeevi as Seeni
- Oviya as Oviya
- Bharath Ravi
- Mahendran
- Santhosh
- Powerstar Srinivasan as Vel Nayakar
- Senthil as Seetha's caretaker
- Saravanan as Annachi
- Chinni Jayanth
- Radharavi
- Ganja Karuppu
- Vaiyapuri
- Ravi Mariya as Paneerselvam
- Swaminathan
- T. P. Gajendran
- Aruldoss
- Bava Lakshmanan

== Production ==
The film began production during June 2014 and marked the debut of producer Madurai Selvam, a former press relations officer for actors including Arjun, Goundamani and Senthil. Rajadurai, who had earlier made I Love You Da (2002), was signed on as the director, while Sanjeevi and Oviya were cast in the lead roles. The shoot took place throughout late 2014 and early 2015, but the producer's financial problems meant that the film was unable to find a distributor. During the making of the film, the producer also fell out with the director, who claimed he was not paid his remuneration.

In August 2017, the film's producer Madurai Selvam opted to change the title of the film from Seeni to Oviyaava Vitta Yaaru, which could be further abbreviated to Oviya. Seeni was changed to the film's tagline. The move was made following the lead actress's new-found popularity following her stint on the Tamil reality television show Bigg Boss. The producer also increased the visibility of actors Ganja Karuppu and Vaiyapuri, and lyricist Snehan, on the promotional material of the film, post their appearance on Bigg Boss. The producer hoped to release the film in late 2017 or early 2018, but further delays meant that the film finally had a theatrical release in May 2019.

== Soundtrack ==
Soundtrack was composed by Srikanth Deva.

No.	Song	Singers	Lyrics
1	"Riya Riya"	Srikanth Deva, Kavitha Gopi, MC Vickey	Snehan Vivekan
2	"Seeni Theme"	MC Vickey	
3	"Un Punnagaiyil"	Srikanth Deva, Nincy Vincent	Sorkko
4	"Vatta Vatta"	Velmurugan, Chinnaponnu, Magizhini Manimaaran	Snehan Vivekan

== Reception ==
In its review, the Asian Age wrote the film was "watchable to some extent". The Times of India gave the film a rating of two-and-a-half out of five stars and wrote "the movie has nothing new to offer and lacks an engaging story, too."
