= Vanna Jigina =

2015 Indian film by Nandha Periyasamy

- Poster
- Directed by: Nandha Periyasamy
- Produced by: N. Subhash Chandrabose; K. Thirukadal Udhayam
- Starring: Vijay Vasanth; Sanyathara
- Cinematography: Balaji V. Ranga
- Edited by: Gopi Krishna
- Music by: John Peter
- Production company: Raghul Films
- Distributed by: Thirrupathi Brothers
- Release date: 21 August 2015
- Running time: 106 minutes
- Country: India
- Language: Tamil

Vanna Jigina is a 2015 Indian Tamil-language film, written and directed by Nandha Periyasamy. The film stars Vijay Vasanth and Sanyathara in the lead roles while Singampuli, Ravi Mariya and Ashwin Raja among others form an ensemble cast. Music for the film was composed by John Peter and the film was released on 21 August 2015.

== Cast ==
- Vijay Vasanth as Pavadai
- Sanyathara as Angel Priya
- Singampuli
- Ravi Mariya
- Ashwin Raja
- Doubt Senthil
- Sugu Venkat as Kishore Kumar
- Sridevi as Karugamani
- Dev Anand
- Sai Bharath
- A. Roshan
- Saicharan
- R. Balakrishnan
- P. Balaji

== Production ==
The film was launched under the title Jigina in July 2014, and carried on using that title through production, before being christened as Vanna Jigina before the film was censored. The project received further media attention after director N. Linguswamy chose to buy the rights of the film and distribute it under his production studio's banner, Thirrupathi Brothers.

== Soundtrack ==
The soundtrack was composed by John Peter. The audio launch happened in mid-June 2015.

- "Rosapoo" – Hariharasudhan
- "Kaathoda" – Surjit, Vinayetha
- "Ayyo En Idhayuthula" – Jayamoorthy

== Reception ==
A critic from The Hindu labelled the film as "backward" and criticising the theme of portraying people with dark skin tones as inferior. Likewise, the critic from The Times of India noted the film is "funny for all the wrong reasons". A reviewer from Deccan Chronicle gave a more favourable report, saying "the director has made a good attempt with a novel idea and even sends out a strong message", but "where he errs is in its execution" and adds had "he concentrated on an interesting screenplay with few more meaningful dialogues, the film would have been an engaging fare". Sify wrote, "Over all, Jigina is yet another average venture with usual cliches but still watchable once for the strong message".
