= Kudimagan =

2019 Tamil film by Sathieshwaran

- Poster
- Directed by: Sathieshwaran
- Written by: Sathieshwaran
- Produced by: Sathieshwaran
- Starring: Jaikumar; Akash; Nanditha Jennifer
- Cinematography: CT Arulselvan
- Edited by: K. R. Selvaraj
- Music by: SM Prashaanth
- Production company: Jeevamalar Sathieshwaran Movies
- Release date: 5 April 2019
- Country: India
- Language: Tamil

Kudimagan (transl. Drunkard) is a 2019 Indian Tamil-language film directed by Sathieshwaran. The film stars Jaikumar, Master Akash, and Nanditha Jennifer in the lead roles.

== Cast ==
The cast includes:

- Jaikumar as Kandhan
- Akash as himself
- Nanditha Jennifer as Chellakannu
- Bava Chelladurai
- Veera Samar
- Bava Lakshmanan
- Krishnamoorthy
- Kiran
- Bala Singh

== Production ==
Akash Anandan, a 7-year-old anti-TASMAC activist, was chosen to play a role in the film. Scenes involving Akash were shot during after school hours so that Akash would not have to skip school. Jayakumar, the grandson of producer Kalaignanam, made his film debut through this film.

== Soundtrack ==
Soundtrack was composed by debutant S. M. Prashanth.

- "Deivangal Ingillai" – Sriram Parthasarathy
- "Ooru Ulagam" – Velmurugan

== Release ==
The Times of India gave this film two out of five stars saying that "The director drives home his message with TV soap opera-ish filmmaking and the subtlety of a sledgehammer". However, News Today Net wrote "Though there are some flaws, yet the intention of the filmmaker should be appreciated. He has stayed away from commercial cliches to drive home a string message".
