= Amudhae =

- DVD cover
- Directed by: S. Ezhil
- Written by: Na. Anbarasu (dialogues)
- Screenplay by: S. Ezhil
- Story by: R. Manimala
- Starring: Jai Akash; Prakash Raj; Madhumitha; Uma Shankari
- Cinematography: Sivakumar
- Edited by: V. T. Vijayan
- Music by: Sunil Xavier
- Production company: AIM productions
- Release date: 20 May 2005
- Running time: 130 minutes
- Country: India
- Language: Tamil

Amudhae is a 2005 Indian Tamil-language romantic drama film directed by Ezhil, starring Jai Akash, Prakash Raj, Madhumitha, and Uma Shankari.

== Plot ==
Nancy, who is in love with Dinakar, marries a millionaire, Victor. Later, Dinakar marries his cousin, Vinaya. How Nancy reunites with Dinakar forms the rest of the story.

== Cast ==
- Jai Akash as Dinakar
- Prakash Raj as Victor
- Madhumitha as Nancy
- Uma Shankari as Vinaya
- Ranjitha as Susi (special appearance)
- Ragasya (special appearance in the song "Pottu Thaluda")
- Anamika (special appearance in the song "Valayal")
- Dhamu as Dinakar's friend
- Delhi Ganesh as Dinakar's father
- M. S. Bhaskar as Victor's friend
- Santhana Bharathi as Nancy's father
- Sathyapriya as Dinakar's mother
- Fathima Babu as Nancy's mother
- Kuyili as Vinaya's mother
- Rajasekar as the church father
- Swaminathan as a priest
- Bava Lakshmanan as the village head
- Krishnamoorthy as an alcoholic

== Production ==
After Ezhil saw a special screening of Ramakrishna, he signed Jai Akash for his next film Amudhae. The film was to be produced by a thirty five person unit, which later became a twenty eight person unit. The film was based on a novel written by Manimala. Madhumitha was cast as the heroine. The film was shot in several locations in Kerala including Alappuzha, Munnar, Kuttanad, Chalakudy and Vazhachal and also at Mumbai and Chennai. The filming was done within 35 days.

== Soundtrack ==
Newcomer Sunil Xavier, who worked as an assistant to S. A. Rajkumar, composed the music for the film and lyrics were written by debutant Tamil Amudhan. The audio was launched at 18 February 2005 at Shree Theatre of Sathyam Cinemas.

- "Anbe Adu Oru Kalam" – Unni Menon, Sujatha, Tamilamudhan
- "Enna Enna Nan Solla" – Tamilamudhan, Swarnalatha
- "Madura Jilla" – Tamilamudhan, Manikka Vinayagam, Priya
- "Pottu Thalluda" – Tamilamudhan, Krishnaraj
- "Valayal Kadu" – Tamilamudhan, Karthik, Subha

== Critical reception ==
A critic from Sify opined that "The film lacks technical finesse and offers little in the way of surprise", praised the performances of Raj, Madhumitha, and Uma while criticising Jai Akash's "wooden", emotionless performance. Malathi Rangarajan of The Hindu opined that "Flashes of brilliance and food for thought the story offers — you could disagree with the logic or feasibility of the proposition tabled, but the point is, it is something different". Malini Mannath of Chennai Online wrote that "If he [Ezhil] had worked on the screenplay better, etched his characters in a more convincing way, and had a tighter grip on his narration, it would have turned out to be a more engaging entertainer". Visual Dasan of Kalki called the film "above average".
