= Santhoshathil Kalavaram =

- Poster
- Directed by: Kranthi Prasad
- Written by: Kranthi Prasad
- Produced by: V.C. Thimma Reddy; Kranthi Prasad; Monotosh Sinha; Pradip Sinha
- Starring: Niranth; C.Kalyan; Aaryan; Rudra Aura; Jai Jagannadh; Ravi Mariya; Gouthami; Soujanya; Shivani; Apeksha; Alex; Swamy
- Cinematography: Paulius Kontijevas(USA); Harrisen Logan Howes(USA); Sravan Kumar
- Edited by: Kranthi Kumar
- Music by: Sivanag
- Production companies: Sree Guru Cinemas, Mango Trees Films
- Release date: 2 November 2018
- Running time: 130 minutes
- Country: India
- Language: Tamil
- Budget: 3crores
- Box office: 14crores

Santhoshathil Kalavaram (transl. Riot out of happiness) is a 2018 Indian Tamil-language thriller film written and directed by Kranthi Prasad, Produced by V.C. Thimma Reddy, Co- Produced by Kranthi Prasad, Monotosh Sinha and Pradip Sinha under Mango Trees Films and Sree Guru Cinemas banner. The film features an ensemble cast including Niranth, Rudra Aura, Aaryan, Gouthami, Soujanya, Shivani and Apeksha in the lead roles. Sivanag composes the music for the film. The film released on 2 November 2018.

== Plot ==
The clash between Good and Evil. Although, the film is a thriller, it encompasses friendship, love, affection, comedy and spirituality as well. fight between negative and positive.

== Cast ==
- Niranth as Veenu
- Rudra Aura as Johny
- Aaryan as Akash
- Ravi Mariya as Ragupathi
- Gouthami Jadav as Kalaivani
- C.Kalyan as Vicky
- Apeksha Panchal as Sonam
- Soujanya as Harini
- Shivani as Sujatha Subramanian
- Jai Jagannadh as Murugan
- Alex as Ramana
- Swamy as Shyam

== Production ==
Santhoshathil Kalavaram, directed by Kranthi Prasad in her directorial debut, features technicians and artistes from seven different industries, including cinematographer Paulius Kontijevas from Hollywood. A major portion of the film happens in the forest and he wanted to capture the sounds of nature in its purest form; so he roped in English Vinglish and Drishyam-fame sound designer Arun Varma.

== Soundtrack ==
Track listing
No.	Title	Writer(s)	Artist(s)	Length
1.	"Kaatru Vaanga Nalla Kaatru"	Mani Amudhavan	Sooraj Santhosh, Rita Thyagarajan	4:38
2.	"Kaala Kaalam Kadhal Kaalam"	Kabilan	P. Unnikrishnan, Chinmayi	4:16
3.	"Kaadum Medum"	Priyan	Sathyaprakash Dharmar	3:13
4.	"Kanne Kanne Kaneeru Enna"	Mani Amudhavan	Abhay Jodhpurkar, Madhumitha	3:16
5.	"Kallodum Pullodum"	Mani Amudhavan	Nivas	4:18
6.	"Santhoshathil Kalavaram Theme"		Sivanag	0:58

== Reception ==
Thinkal Menon of The Times of India gave the film 1.5/5 stars and wrote, "A wafer-thin plot, which hardly has any engaging sequences, gets comparatively better in the second half, only to make things worse towards the end. The romantic portions of the four pairs, too, do not make any impact. After a point, we lose interest in the proceedings as the screenplay moves slowly without a solid purpose. The shoddy CG works, poor flashback sequence and strictly okayish performance rub salt into the wound."

Avinash Ramachandran of The New Indian Express gave the film 1.5/5 stars and wrote, "Basically, Santhoshathil Kalavaram is a Facebook post or a YouTube preach video masquerading as a supernatural, horror, romantic, survivalist thriller. The moments are there, the good intentions are there, but this unintentionally funny film, in the time of Whatsapp and Twitter, is like those hundreds of unread text messages archived in our phones — unfortunately, outdated.
