= Yaanai Mel Kuthirai Sawaari =

2016 Indian film by Karupaiyaa Murugan

- Theatrical release poster
- Directed by: Karupaiyaa Murugan
- Written by: Karupaiyaa Murugan
- Produced by: Karupaiyaa Murugan
- Starring: Archana Singh; Rajendran; Swaminathan; Krishnamoorthy; Muthuraman; Mippu; Tharika
- Cinematography: S. Mohan
- Edited by: C. Ganesh Kumar
- Music by: Songs: Imalayen; Score: Taj Noor
- Production company: Battlers Cinema
- Distributed by: 119 minutes
- Release date: 19 August 2016
- Country: India
- Language: Tamil

Yaanai Mel Kuthirai Sawaari (transl. A horse ride atop an elephant) is a 2016 Indian Tamil-language romantic comedy film written, produced, and directed by Karupaiyaa Murugan. The film Archana Singh, Rajendran, Swaminathan, Krishnamoorthy, Muthuraman, Mippu, and Tharika. The songs were composed by Imalayen, while Taj Noor composed the score. Cinematography was handled by S. Mohan and editing by C. Ganesh Kumar. The film was released on 19 August 2016.

== Plot ==
Akalya works in a loom factory and works under her boss, who is in love with her. Two men manage a loom factory next door to Akalya's, and they fall in love with her. Hari, an ice cream seller, forgets his age and wants to marry Akalya. Meanwhile, Sunil Kumar falls in love a tenth grade girl, Nirmala. With several people in love with her, Akalya is unsure of what to do. The wives of the men who are in love with Akalya come to Akalya's house. They tell Akalya that if she tells the police about all of her loves, then all the wives will suffer. To prevent any issues, the wives suffocate Akalya and hang her from the ceiling as if she committed suicide.

== Cast ==
- Archana Singh as Akalya
- Rajendran
- Swaminathan
- Krishnamoorthy as M. Hari
- Muthuraman as Akalya's boss
- Mippu as Sunil Kumar
- Tharika as Nirmala
- Sumathi G. as Swaminathan's wife

== Soundtrack ==
The songs are composed by Imalayen.

Track listing
No.	Title	Singer(s)	Length
1.	"Yaanai Mel Kuthirai Sawaari"	Nagash	2:38
2.	"Pollatha Kadhalu"	Gana Jagan	3:31
3.	"Beeru Kudicha Happy"	Hariharasudhan, Veena	4:20
4.	"Ada Da Da Da"	Sakthi	4:21
Total length:			14:50

== Reception ==
Malini Mannath of The New Indian Express wrote that "Yaanai Mel... is at the most a stepping stone for a debutant director". Samayam gave the film a rating of one out of five stars and praised the film's title and music while criticising the double meaning comic sequences. Dinamalar praised the director and actors' performances while criticising the editing, cinematography, and climax.
