= Ravi Mariya =

Indian film director and actor (born 1979)

- Born: 4 August 1979 (age 47); Virudhunagar, Tamil Nadu, India
- Occupations: Director, actor, writer
- Years active: 2000–present
- Spouse: Mariya
- Honours: Kalaimamani (2020)

S. Ravi Mariya (born August 4, 1979) is an Indian film director and actor who works primarily in Tamil cinema. He appears in villainous and supporting roles.

== Career ==
Ravi Mariya started working as S. J. Suryah assistant with cameo in the movie Kushi (2000) which had Vijay in the lead. He made his debut directing Jiiva in Aasai Aasaiyai (2003). Ravi Mariya's directorial debut was meant to be Nee Naan Kaadhal starring Prashanth for Super Good Films, but the project was later stalled.

He was later seen in New (2004), Anbe Aaruyire (2005), Veyil (2006), Pazhani (2008). He also dialogue writer in Aalwar (2007) and Sandai (2008). Mariya ventured in Malayalam cinema with Major Ravi's Mission 90 Days (2007) and Kurukshetra (2008). He collaborated with Rasu Madhuravan and acted in the dramas films Mayandi Kudumbathar (2009) and Goripalayam (2010). He directed his second film Milaga in 2010.

He appeared in Jilla (2014), starring Mohanlal and Vijay as a comedic bald villain. Ravi Mariya took to some negative roles and made his mark as actor.

Director Ezhil explored his humor quotient and cast him in humorous roles in Manam Kothi Paravai (2012), Desingu Raja (2013), Velainu Vandhutta Vellaikaaran (2016), Saravanan Irukka Bayamaen (2017) and Desingu Raja 2 (2025).

== Filmography ==
Key
†	Denotes films that have not yet been released

=== Tamil films ===
Year	Film	Role	Notes
2000	Kushi	Man at temple	Also associate director
2003	Aasai Aasaiyai	Ravi	Also director
2004	New	Math professor	Cameo appearance
2005	Anbe Aaruyire	Doctor	
2006	Veyil	Bose	
2008	Pazhani	Ekadasi	
2008	Sandai	Kamaraj's cousin	
2009	Mayandi Kudumbathar	Chokkan Virumandi	
2010	Goripalayam	Viruman	
2010	Milaga	Gajendra	Also director
2010	Maathi Yosi	Baby's uncle	
2012	Manam Kothi Paravai	Natraj	
2012	Yugam	Inspector	
2013	Azhagan Azhagi		
2013	Vathikuchi	Benny's friend	
2013	Desingu Raja	Chithappa	
2014	Jilla	Paandi	
2014	Lingaa	Hotel manager	
2015	Vanna Jigina		
2015	Bhooloham	Thiruvengadam	
2016	Enna Pidichirukka		
2016	Velainu Vandhutta Vellaikaaran	Bhootham	
2016	Muthina Kathirika	Ravikumar	
2016	Ennama Katha Vudranunga		
2016	Pagiri		
2016	Ilami	Verayyan	
2017	Saravanan Irukka Bayamaen	Maudeswaran	Guest appearance
2017	Thupparivaalan	Mallika's uncle	
2017	Hara Hara Mahadevaki	Thalaivar	
2017	Ippadai Vellum	Kanthuvatti Murugan	
2017	Kadaisi Bench Karthi	"Love" Guru	
2018	Pakka	Magizhchi Minor	
2018	Santhoshathil Kalavaram	Ragupathi	
2019	Charlie Chaplin 2	Bullet Pushparaj	
2019	Oviyavai Vitta Yaru		
2019	Boomerang	Councillor	
2019	Gurkha	Harris Jayaraj	
2019	Vennila Kabaddi Kuzhu 2	Pazhani	
2020	Naan Sirithal	Sakaradas	
2020	Irandam Kuththu	Dr. Thambidurai	
2021	Michaelpatty Raja	Raja's brother-in-law	
2021	Jail	Perumal	
2022	Idiot	Thiru Don Sekar	
2022	Hostel	Indran	
2022	Kaatteri	Kaliyurunda	
2022	Gurumoorthi	Selvam	
2022	Oh My Ghost		
2023	Unnaal Ennaal		
2023	Saandrithazh		
2023	Tamil Kudimagan	Sudalaiyandi's advocate	
2023	Chandramukhi 2	Ranganayaki's elder brother's son	
2023	Sarakku		
2024	Vadakkupatti Ramasamy	Kaalaiyan	
2024	Vasco Da Gama	Politician	
2025	Otha Votu Muthaiya	Sai Krishna	
2025	Leg Piece	Rasalingam	
2025	Desingu Raja 2	Minister Nangooram	
2026	Sweety Naughty Crazy	Warden	
2026	Yaarra Andha Paiyan Naan Dhan Andha Paiyan	Sub-Inspector R. Sukumar	
2026	Breakfast		

=== Other language films ===
Year	Film	Role	Language	Notes
2007	Mission 90 Days	Chempayya	Malayalam	
2008	Kurukshetra	Krishna	Malayalam	
2010	Toofan	Police Inspector	Hindi	uncredited
2013	3G Third Generation		Malayalam	

=== Other crew positions ===
Year	Film	Director	Writer	Ref.
2002	Aasai Aasaiyai	Yes	Yes	
2007	Aalwar	No	Dialogues	
2008	Sandai	No	Dialogues	
2010	Milaga	Yes	Yes	

=== Television ===
Year	Title	Role	Network	Notes
2026-present	Celebrity Masterchef Tamil	Contestant	Sony Vizha	
