= Maharani Kottai =

2015 Indian film by S. Vinod Kumar

- Directed by: S. Vinod Kumar
- Written by: S. Vinod Kumar
- Produced by: Subramaniam; Thanamalar S Vinod Kumar
- Starring: Richard; Annie Prince Nag
- Cinematography: Chandran Chami
- Edited by: V. Don Bosco
- Music by: U. K. Murali
- Production company: Thanamalar Creations
- Release date: 10 July 2015
- Running time: 118 mins
- Country: India
- Language: Tamil

Maharani Kottai (English: Queen's Castle) is a 2015 Indian Tamil-language horror comedy drama film written and directed by S. Vinod Kumar. The film features Richard and Annie Prince Nag in the lead roles, alongside Senthil and Ganesh. Produced by Thanamalar Creations, the film was released on 10 July 2015.

== Cast ==
- Richard
- Annie Prince Nag
- Senthil
- Ganesh
- Ganja Karuppu
- Powerstar Srinivasan
- Ashvin Raja
- Ashwini
- Velmurugan
- Bava Lakshmanan
- Vaiyapuri
- Thyagu
- Benjamin
- Nellai Siva
- Bonda Mani
- King Kong
- Sam Anderson

== Production ==
After making a Telugu film titled Win featuring Jai Akash, Vinod Kumar began making Maharani Kottai in Tamil and cast Richard and actress Annie Prince Nag in the lead roles. The film was produced by Singapore-based Subramaniam and Thanamalar as a joint venture for Dhanamalar Creations.

== Soundtrack ==
The soundtrack had songs composed by U. K. Murali. The film's audio launch was hold on 20 September 2014.

== Release and reception ==
The film had a theatrical release across Tamil Nadu on 16 December 2016. A reviewer from Maalai Malar called the film "not scary" and gave the film a negative review. The reviewer from Dinamalar called the film "logic-less".
