= Ashvin Raja =

Indian actor

- Born: Ashwin Swaminathan; 21 November 1989 (age 36); Chennai, Tamil Nadu, India
- Other name: Raja
- Occupation: Actor
- Years active: 2010–present
- Spouse: Vidyashree (m. 2020)
- Parent: Venkataraman Swaminathan

Ashvin Raja is an Indian actor who has appeared in Tamil language films. He is the son of the film producer V. Swaminathan of Lakshmi Movie Makers.

== Personal life ==
Ashvin Raja is the son of producer Swaminathan, who owns the production house, Lakshmi Movie Makers. He had also done cameos in some of the movies produced by him. V. Swaminathan died on 10 August 2020 due to COVID-19. He had been undergoing treatment in a private hospital in Chennai after testing positive for Coronavirus. He became the first person from Tamil film industry to have died of COVID-19. Ashwin, married his girlfriend Vidyashree on 24 June 2020. She is a practising doctor.

== Career ==
Ashvin made his film debut portraying the student Paalpandi in Rajesh's comedy film Boss Engira Bhaskaran (2010). His performance in Prabhu Solomon's Kumki (2012) as an elephant herder alongside Vikram Prabhu and Thambi Ramaiah was also well received by film critics, and had allotted sixty six days to the film for the shoot. The success of Kumki led to him being referred to "Kumki Ashwin" henceforth. In 2013, he was seen in smaller roles notably featuring in Thillu Mullu and Naiyaandi alongside Dhanush. He acted in horror movie like Maharani Kottai (2015) and comedy Narathan (2016). In 2019, he was seen in Jyothika's Jackpot and Harish Kalyan starrer Dhanusu Raasi Neyargale.

== Filmography ==
Year	Film	Role	Notes
2010	Boss Engira Bhaskaran	Paalpaandi Thevar	
2011	Eththan		
2011	Vanthaan Vendraan	Singamuthu's nephew	
2012	Naanga		
2012	Kumki	Undiyal	
2013	Sillunu Oru Sandhippu		
2013	Thillu Mullu	Pasupati's friend	
2013	Naiyaandi	Chinna Vandu's friend	
2014	Nedunchaalai	Soozhi	
2014	Ennamo Nadakkuthu	OC Kumar	
2014	Manjapai	Tamil's friend	
2015	Kaaval		
2015	Maharani Kottai		
2015	Sakalakala Vallavan	Shakti's friend	
2015	Chandi Veeran		
2015	Jigina		
2015	Eetti	Pughazh's friend	
2016	Kanithan	Thirupathi	
2016	Vaaliba Raja		
2016	Narathan	Pazham	
2016	Velainu Vandhutta Vellaikaaran		
2016	Jumbulingam 3D	Maanasthan	
2016	Uchathula Shiva	Accused	
2016	Thodari	Pantry worker	
2016	Virumandikkum Sivanandikkum	Vincent Selva	
2016	Achamindri		
2017	Motta Shiva Ketta Shiva	Ashwin	
2017	Mathipen		
2017	Saravanan Irukka Bayamaen	Saravanan's friend	
2018	Tamizh Padam 2	Police Constable	
2019	Dharmaprabhu		Cameo appearance
2019	Jackpot	Maanasthan's assistant	
2019	Dhanusu Raasi Neyargale	Joseph	
2019	Chennai 2 Bangkok		Special appearance
2021	Plan Panni Pannanum	Arokkiyasaamy / Eruma Saani	
2022	Yutha Satham	Ashvin	
2022	Nenjuku Needhi	Mechanic Suresh	
2023	Pathu Thala	Thangamani	
2023	Tamilarasan		
2023	Echo		
2023	Demon		
2023	80s Buildup	Kathir’s friend	
2024	Thookudurai	Gopi	
2024	Rathnam	Muthu	
2025	Mr. Housekeeping	Honest's friend	
2025	Kuzhanthaigal Munnetra Kazhagam		
2025	Desingu Raja 2		

=== Television ===
- Label (2023)
