= Bava Lakshmanan =

Indian actor

- Other name: Super Good Lakshmanan
- Years active: 1990–present
- Known for: Actor

Bava Lakshmanan is an Indian Tamil actor and comedian who predominantly featured in comedy roles. For the major part of his acting career, he shared screenspace with fellow veteran comedian actor Vadivelu in many film comedy sequences.

== Career ==
Originally from Madurai, Lakshmanan was born as fifth child among two sisters and six brothers in the family. He started his career as child actor portraying Surulirajan's son in Madras to Pondicherry (1966) through which he developed interest towards acting. He was originally screen tested for Karthik's role in Alaigal Oivathillai (1981), which did not happen. He briefly worked as painter and construction worker. He joined as worker for FEFSI Vijayan through which he tried for opportunities for films. He worked as manager for the film Sirayil Sila Raagangal (1990) and worked as production manager for Super Good Films where he earned the name Super Good Lakshmanan. Many directors cast him in comedic roles due to his Madurai Tamil dialect.

He received more attention and popularity from general audience when they regularly combined with Vadivelu in comedy tracks. He was well known for his dialogue "Vaa Ma Minnal" (transl. "Come Minnal"; lit. 'Come Lightning') during a marriage proposal sequence in the film Maayi (2000), which gained him lot of fame.

He had worked as a painter for over 5 years after not gaining adequate film acting opportunities due to being constantly cornered and sidelined by the new filmmakers in search of finding youngsters in comedy roles and also the trend of separate comedy track genre began to dwindle in Tamil cinema post 2015. He alongside other side character artists and comedian actors only made sporadic appearances in films ever since Vadivelu lost film acting opportunities as the latter was banned due to lack of work ethic and other controversies. Hence Bava Lakshmanan along with the renowned Vadivelu gang was mostly ignored by filmmakers in Tamil cinema post Vadivelu era as the current set of filmmakers went onto cast popular social media trendsetters and social media influencers in film comedy sequences. Bava Lakshmanan eventually went onto act in numerous small budgeted films as a result of the change in taste of the mindset of Tamil film industry as well as the change in preference of the mindset by the audience. His deteriorating health condition also further hampered his acting career in perhaps what is considered to be his latter stages of his career.

== Controversy ==
He stirred a controversy during the shooting set of Aanandham (2001), when he tried to slap fellow actor Abbas over a dispute regarding the fact that Abbas did not maintain punctuality by arriving late to the shooting sets. Bava Lakshmanan revealed in an exclusive interview that he inquired upon why Abbas did not adhere to the accountability and responsibility that should have been followed by him in terms of reporting to the film shoot on time and Abbas was quoted to have said he would only come like that taking his time. Hence Lakshmanan became furious over the immature response from Abbas, whereas the former highlighted the fact that the main lead actor Mammootty who has a huge star status had arrived to the shooting sets of Aanandham on time.

== Personal life ==
Lakshmanan also suffered significant setback in his acting career when he was diagnosed with diabetes. One of his big toes had been removed after undergoing a surgery at Chennai Omanthurar Government Hospital due to excessive sugar levels. He remains a bachelor and lives alone at his residence. He also revealed in a YouTube interview that he was addicted to liquor consumption which was also one of the prime reasons why he lost on many acting offers.

== Partial filmography ==
=== Films ===
- Sirayil Sila Raagangal (1990)
- Sollamale (1998)
- Poomagal Oorvalam (1999)
- Pennin Manathai Thottu (2000)
- Maayi (2000)
- Aanandham (2001)
- Red (2002)
- Roja Kootam (2002)
- Thamizh (2002)
- Raja (2002)
- Jjunction (2002)
- Run (2002)
- En Mana Vaanil (2002)
- April Maadhathil (2002)
- Vaseegara (2003)
- Aasai Aasaiyai (2003)
- Arasu (2003)
- Kadhal Sadugudu (2003)
- Ice (2003)
- Alaudin (2003)
- Winner (2003)
- Kurumbu (2003)
- Soori (2003)
- Kovil (2004)
- Vayasu Pasanga (2004)
- Chatrapathy (2004)
- Aai (2004)
- Ayodhya (2005)
- Ayya (2005)
- Jithan (2005)
- 6′.2″ (2005)
- Kadhal Seiya Virumbu (2005)
- Amudhae (2005)
- Englishkaran (2005)
- Sivakasi (2005)
- ABCD (2005)
- Bambara Kannaley (2005)
- Aanai (2005)
- Paramasivan (2006)
- Nagareega Komali (2006)
- Kovai Brothers (2006)
- Sudesi (2006)
- Don Chera (2006)
- Kai Vandha Kalai (2006)
- Unakkum Enakkum (2006)
- Kurukshetram (2006)
- Perarasu (2006)
- Varalaru (2006)
- Dharmapuri (2006)
- Kumaran (2006)
- Muruga (2007)
- Viyabari (2007)
- Thaamirabharani (2007)
- Vel (2007)
- Thottal Poo Malarum (2007)
- Karuppusamy Kuththagaithaarar (2007)
- Koodal Nagar (2007)
- Pazhani (2008)
- Sandai (2008)
- Pandi (2008)
- Pirivom Santhippom (2008)
- Kee Mu (2008)
- Aayudham Seivom (2008)
- Ragasiya Snehithane (2008)
- Ini Varum Kaalam (2008)
- Theeyavan (2008)
- Indiralohathil Na Azhagappan (2008)
- Ellam Avan Seyal (2008)
- Surya (2008)
- Sutta Pazham (2008)
- Perumal (2009)
- Solla Solla Inikkum (2009)
- Aarumaname (2009)
- Gnabagangal (2009)
- 1977 (2009)
- Ninaithale Inikkum (2009)
- Moscowin Kavery (2010)
- 365 Kadhal Kadithangal (2010)
- Nagaram Marupakkam (2010)
- Azhagaana Ponnuthan (2010)
- Mandhira Punnagai (2010)
- Nellu (2010)
- Aattanayagann (2010)
- Vedi (2011)
- Osthe (2011) as Veeralingam
- Markandeyan (2011)
- Udhayan (2011)
- Ilaignan (2011)
- Aivar (2011)
- Kalakalappu (2012)
- Yugam (2012)
- Pandi Oliperukki Nilayam (2012)
- Saattai (2012)
- Thagaraaru (2013)
- Pattathu Yaanai (2013)
- Pandiya Naadu (2013)
- Chandhamama (2013)
- Oruvar Meethu Iruvar Sainthu (2013)
- Theeya Velai Seiyyanum Kumaru (2013)
- Thulli Vilayadu (2013)
- Tenaliraman (2014)
- Angusam (2014)
- Poriyaalan (2014)
- Vellaikaara Durai (2014)
- Vilaasam (2014)
- Jilla (2014)
- Velmurugan Borewells (2014)
- Jeeva (2014)
- Vanavarayan Vallavarayan (2014)
- Adhibar (2015)
- Aavi Kumar (2015)
- Sathuran (2015)
- Maharani Kottai (2015)
- Eli (2015)
- En Vazhi Thani Vazhi (2015)
- Velainu Vandhutta Vellaikaaran (2016)
- Pagiri (2016)
- Navarasa Thilagam (2016)
- Tamilselvanum Thaniyar Anjalum (2016)
- Kaththi Sandai (2016)
- Hello Naan Pei Pesuren (2016)
- Thirunaal (2016)
- Si3 (2017)
- Saravanan Irukka Bayamaen (2017)
- Tubelight (2017)
- Bongu (2017)
- Kaathadi (2018)
- Kaathiruppor Pattiyal (2018)
- Kadikara Manithargal (2018)
- Torchlight (2018)
- Pottu (2019)
- Oviyavai Vitta Yaru (2019)
- Sathru (2019)
- Butler Balu (2019)
- Kudimagan (2019)
- Ganesha Meendum Santhipom (2019)
- Butler Balu (2019)
- Kanni Raasi (2020)
- Cocktail (2020)
- Thaen (2021)
- Jango (2021)
- Eeswaran (2021)
- Thanne Vandi (2021)
- Idiot (2022)
- Hostel (2022)
- Pistha (2022)
- Rayar Parambarai (2023)
- Mudakkaruthaan (2024)
- Mr. Housekeeping (2025)

=== Television ===
- Enga Veetu Meenakshi (2021)
