= Pennin Manathai Thottu =

- Film poster
- Directed by: S. Ezhil
- Written by: S. Ezhil; V. Prabhakaran (dialogues); Na.Anbharasu (uncredited)
- Produced by: M. Kaja Mydeen
- Starring: Prabhu Deva; Jaya Seal
- Cinematography: V. Manikandan
- Edited by: V. Jai Shankar
- Music by: S. A. Rajkumar
- Production company: Roja Combines
- Release date: 7 July 2000
- Running time: 165 minutes
- Country: India
- Language: Tamil

Pennin Manathai Thottu (transl. Touched the heart of a girl) is a 2000 Indian Tamil-language romantic drama film written and directed by S. Ezhil. The film stars Prabhu Deva and Jaya Seal, with R. Sarathkumar in an extended guest appearance. Produced by Kaja Mydeen, the film was released on 7 July 2000 and became a commercial success.

== Plot ==
Sunil is one of the leading heart surgeons in India. He lives in Trichy with Ganapathy, who is also a doctor and is loved by everyone in the family. Sunitha arrives with a child who has a heart problem to the hospital. But she is shocked seeing Sunil there and lashes out when she learns he is the doctor who is about to treat the child.

The movie goes into a flashback. Sunil's brother Balaram "Bala" is a rich thug but does not want his brother to follow his footsteps; therefore, he always sends him to study. Sunil and Sunitha are classmates in a medical college in Chennai and they both fall in love. Sunil expresses his wish of marrying Sunitha to Bala, for which he accepts. Meanwhile, Sunitha goes back to her village for her sister's child's ear piercing ceremony. Her sister's husband is money-minded and tries to get Sunitha married to a rich man in return for money. Sunitha is not interested in this alliance as she is in love with Sunil and calls him, asking him to come and rescue her, but he does not come. Sunitha's sister commits suicide to stop the marriage. Sunitha is angered on Sunil as he does not come to save her, which also resulted in her sister's death. Sunitha takes her sister's child and leaves.

Sunil tries to meet Sunitha and convey the reason for not coming to save her, but Sunitha is not ready to listen. Sunil is worried and decides to leave to Canada, accepting a job offer there. Finally, Sunitha understands the truth: her sister's husband had killed Bala on the day of the marriage; therefore, Sunil was not able to come on time to stop the wedding. Sunitha finds out and tries to find and stop Sunil, who is going to Canada. In the end, she finds him and they reunite.

== Cast ==
- Prabhu Deva as Sunil
- R. Sarathkumar as Balaram "Bala" (guest appearance)
- Jaya Seal as Sunitha
- Vivek as Kandhasamy
- Dhamu as Dhamu
- Vaiyapuri as Mute Servant
- Aishwarya as Sunitha's sister
- Kaveri as Meena
- Moulee as Ganapathy
- S. Rajasekar as Dr. Shyam
- Kaka Radhakrishnan as Ganapathy's father
- N. Mathrubootham as Professor Das (Lord Labakkudaas)
- Ramji as Ramji
- Madhan Bob as Madhan
- Chaplin Balu as Thozhar Arivumathi
- Mayilsamy as Pickpocket
- Pandu as Police Inspector
- Ponnambalam as Rowdy
- Mahanadi Shankar as Rowdy
- S. N. Lakshmi as Ganapathy's mother
- Shanthi Williams as Mythili
- Jayapriya
- Hemanth Ravan as Sunitha's brother-in-law
- Vasu Vikram as Pandi
- Sakthivel as Sakthivel
- Sukran as Student
- Kottachi as Kottangachi
- MLA Thangaraj as MLA Ekambaram
- Crane Manohar as Pickpocket
- Bava Lakshmanan as Pickpocket
- Krishnamoorthy as Pickpocket

Uncredited roles

- Kanal Kannan as Left
- Sampath Ram as Henchman
- Shobi as Dancer in "Kalloori Vaanil"
- Sridhar as Dancer in "Kalloori Vaanil"
- Karu Palaniappan as Man giving change
- Raju Sundaram in a special appearance

== Production ==
After the success of Thullatha Manamum Thullum (1999), Vijay and Ezhil immediately decided to follow up this film with another collaboration, Oru Pennin Manathai Thottu, with either Isha Koppikar or Roja as the lead actress. However soon after pre-production, Vijay was replaced by Prabhu Deva. Jaya Seal made her Tamil debut; she previously appeared in a few advertisements and non-Tamil films.

Sarathkumar chose to be a part of the film after two of his other films became suddenly postponed. He had cut his hair short for Maayi (2000), and as the other films required different hairstyles, the producers had pushed back the dates. To compensate for the lost time, Sarathkumar agreed to portray an extended guest role in the film.

The shooting for the film was held at locations in Chennai, Hyderabad, and Bangalore. A song was shot on Prabhu Deva and his brother Raju Sundaram with a set resembling a market place was erected, and about 40 dancers participated in the dance with the duo.

== Soundtrack ==
The soundtrack was composed by S. A. Rajkumar. The tune of the track "Thyagarajarin Deiva Keerthanam" is based on a popular Thyagaraja kriti itself – "Entha Nerchina", which is set in the raga Shuddha Dhanyasi. The first 2 lines of song "Kannukkulle Unnai" is inspired from the Hindi song "Ruk Ja O Jaanewaali". Venky of Chennai Online wrote "Overall, an okay effort by S.A. Rajkumar".

Track listing
| No. | Title | Lyrics | Singer(s) | Length |
|---|---|---|---|---|
| 1. | "Kannukkulle" | Muthu Vijayan | Unni Menon | 4:44 |
| 2. | "Udhadukkum" | Vairamuthu | Devan, Srividya, Febi Mani | 4:37 |
| 3. | "Nan Salt Kotta" | S. A. Rajkumar | Sukhwinder Singh, Krishnaraj | 3:56 |
| 4. | "Kalloori Vaanil" | Vaali | Devan, Anuradha Sriram, Deepika | 4:45 |
| 5. | "Thiyagarajarin" | Vaali | P. Unnikrishnan, Nithyasree Mahadevan, S. A. Rajkumar, Febi Mani | 4:56 |
| 6. | "Kannukkulle Unnai" | Muthu Vijayan | P. Unnikrishnan | 4:45 |
| Total length: | | | | 27:43 |

== Release and reception ==
Rajitha from Rediff.com wrote "the movie has its moments, so I wouldn't say this is a must-avoid" and praised the performances of Prabhu Deva and Sarathkumar. Tamil Star wrote "Director Ezhil who tasted success with his very first film 'Thullatha Manamum Thullum', proves yet again that within the parameters of commercial cinema one can make a film that is a clean engaging entertainer". Krishna Chidambaram of Kalki praised Rajkumar's music, Vivek's humour but felt Prabhu Deva was ill-suited for the character of heart surgeon. Indiainfo wrote "The first half of the movie is quite enjoyable but towards the second half, the director, Ezhil, loses his grip. Prabhu Deva does some good fights in the first half of the movie. Sarath Kumar looks tough and every inch a dada while Jayaseal looks too old for Prabhu Deva. However, no one takes the accolades when it comes to emoting. The plus points in the movie are its choreography and music ( by S A Rajkumar). Camerawork by Manikantan is another asset for the film. Recommended for those who want to see the action hero and the dancing star together. Other can give it a go by."

== In popular culture ==
A screenshot of the meme described in this section.

The song "Kalluri Vaanil" danced by Prabhu Deva became widely known on the internet in the form of a mondegreen/soramimi spoof and viral video, following its subtitling, commonly known as "Benny Lava", by YouTube user Mike Sutton (Buffalax). The name Benny Lava comes from Sutton; the Tamil line "Kalluri vaanil kaayndha nilaavo?" was rendered as "My loony bun is fine, Benny Lava!". This video led other YouTube users to refer to Prabhu Deva as "Benny Lava".

Reactions to the "Kalluri Vaanil" mondegreen were mixed. Some felt that the video was done in "good fun", while others worried that their culture was being mocked. The video was described by the Philippine Daily Inquirer as a "Catchy melody, a battalion of back-up dancers, colourful costumes, impressive vocal gymnastics, jaw-dropping choreography this music video has it all. And if those aren't enough, the person who uploaded this vid also provided subtitles so you can sing along. They aren't the real lyrics though, but just what they sound in English, resulting in humorous nonsense." The music video was featured on The Colbert Report on 4 December 2008. In 2014, British-American hip-hop group Swet Shop Boys sampled the original song for their debut single, called "Benny Lava".
