= Soori (actor) =

Indian actor (born 1977)

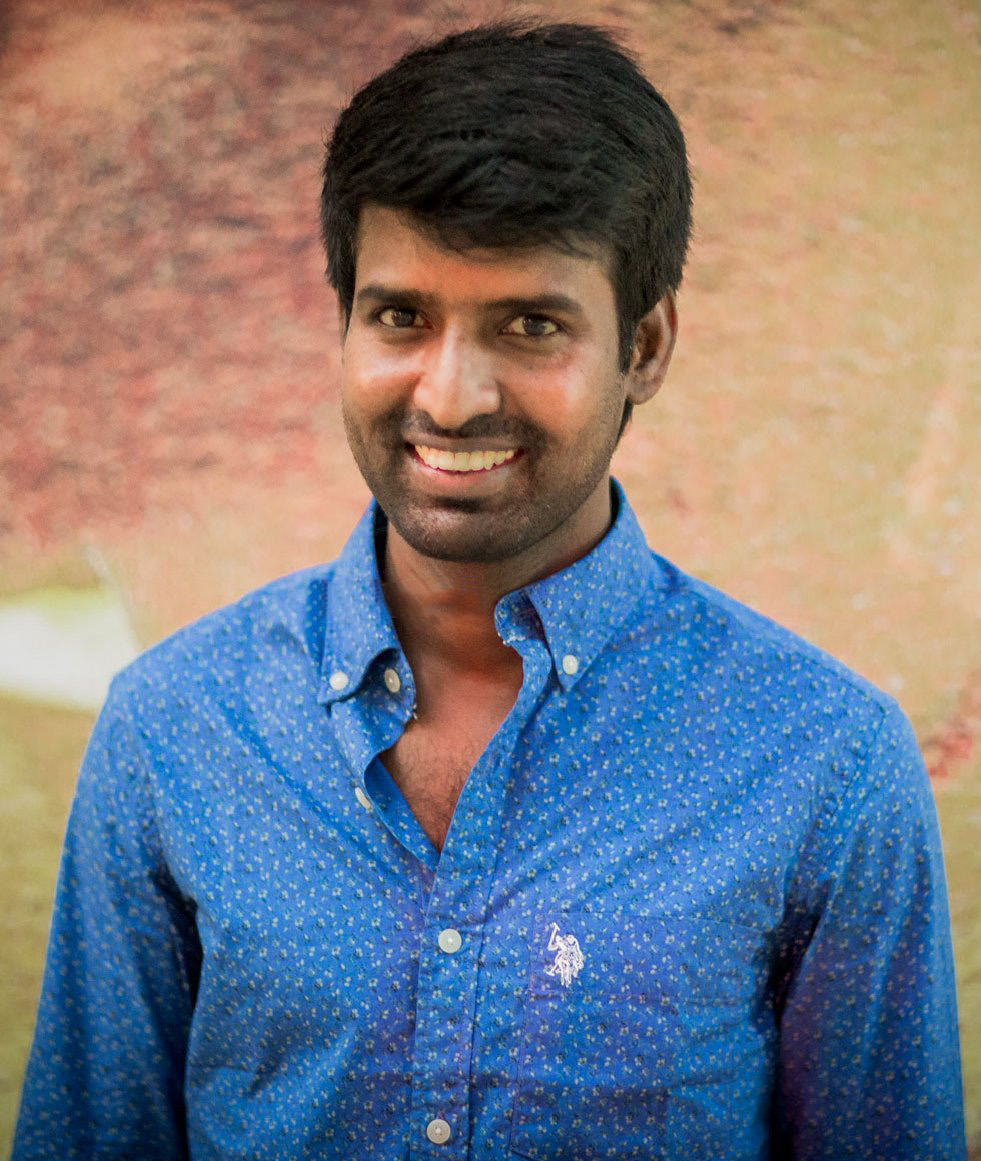
- Soori in 2015
- Born: Ramalakshmanan Muthuchamy; 27 August 1977 (age 49); Madurai, Tamil Nadu, India
- Occupations: Actor; Comedian
- Years active: 1998–present
- Spouse: Mahalakshmi (m.2009)
- Children: 2

Ramalakshmanan Muthuchamy (born 27 August 1977), professionally known as Soori, is an Indian actor who predominantly appears in Tamil cinema. Debuting in 1998, he acted in several uncredited roles before his major breakthrough in Vennila Kabadi Kuzhu (2009), where he earned the moniker Parotta Soori. After a decade as a comedian, his dramatic turn as a lead actor in Vetrimaaran's Viduthalai Part 1 (2023) received critical acclaim. In 2026, Mandaadi, in which he starred, became a critically acclaimed box-office hit.

== Career ==
Soori moved from Madurai to Chennai in 1996 with the intention of becoming an actor in the Tamil film industry. After failing to get any roles, he took up work in the city as a cleaner to fund his acting ambitions.

He played occasional uncredited roles in films as a junior artiste, appearing especially in comedy scenes, such as in Winner (2003). and thereafter Ezhil's Deepavali.

Soori notably appeared in the critical and commercial hit film Vennila Kabadi Kuzhu (2009). He became known as Parotta Soori after the film's release because of a comedy scene in which his character eats 50 parottas. He later appeared in a number of films in well-received comedic and sidekick roles, such as Poraali (2011), Sundarapandian (2012), Varuthapadatha Valibar Sangam (2013), and Jilla (2014). His supporting roles were also praised in Rajini Murugan (2016) Idhu Namma Aalu (2016), Velainu Vandhutta Vellaikaaran (2016), and Sangili Bungili Kadhava Thorae (2017).

In 2018, he was seen in both Sivakarthikeyan's Seema Raja and Vikram's Saamy Square. However, his comedic performances in these two films were heavily criticised, prompting Soori himself to respond. He went on to have back-to-back releases with the successful Namma Veettu Pillai (2019) and the panned Sangathamizhan (2019).

In 2023, Soori was cast against type as the main protagonist of Vetrimaaran's period crime thriller, Viduthalai Part 1. His performance garnered highly positive appreciation from critics as well as audiences. This was followed by leading roles in Garudan (2024), a neo-noir action film, and Kottukkaali (2024), a drama-comedy about caste, as well as Yezhu Kadal Yezhu Malai (2024), a period-bending romantic drama. All three films widely received critical acclaim for their direction and performances, with Kottukkali and Yezhu Kadal Yezhu Malai being screened at the 74th Berlin International Film Festival and the 53rd International Film Festival Rotterdam respectively.

== Personal life ==
After watching Thalapathi (1991), Muthuchamy adopted the protagonist's name, Surya, which was shortened to 'Soori' after he entered cinema.

Soori lives in a joint family and has six siblings. He is married and has a son and a daughter.

== Filmography ==
=== Films ===
Year	Film	Role	Notes
1998	Maru Malarchi	Audience member	Uncredited role
1999	Sangamam	Crowd member	Uncredited role
2000	James Pandu	Railway porter	Uncredited role
2000	Kannan Varuvaan	Man in a temple	Uncredited role
2001	Ullam Kollai Poguthey	Illicit liquor smuggler	Uncredited role
2002	Red	Thief	Uncredited role
2003	Winner	Kaipullai's henchmen	Uncredited role
2003	Ooruku Nooruper	Balan and Anandan's acquaintance	Uncredited role
2004	Varnajalam	Thief	Uncredited role
2004	Kaadhal	Mansion mate	Uncredited role
2005	Ji	College student	
2007	Deepavali	Fish seller	
2007	Dhandayuthapani	Dhandayuthapani's friend	
2007	Nyabagam Varuthey	"Jalra" Soori	
2007	Thiruvakkarai Sri Vakrakaliamman	Police constable	
2008	Kee Mu	"Nethili" Murugan	
2008	Bheemaa	Chinna's henchman	
2009	Vennila Kabadi Kuzhu	Subramani	
2009	Naai Kutty	Maari	
2010	Kalavani	Manikandan	
2010	Naan Mahaan Alla	Ravi	
2010	Unakkaga En Kadhal	"Blade" Balu	
2010	Unakkaga Oru Kavithai	Vinoth's friend	
2011	Varmam	Guna	
2011	Aadu Puli	Karuppu	
2011	Thoonga Nagaram	Address informer for Theru Trisha	
2011	Kullanari Koottam	Murugesan	
2011	Appavi	Bharathi's friend	
2011	Azhagarsamiyin Kuthirai	Chandran	
2011	Bodinayakkanur Ganesan	Gilaki	
2011	Pillaiyar Theru Kadaisi Veedu	Soori	
2011	Vaagai Sooda Vaa	Man at theatre	
2011	Velayudham	Abdullah	
2011	Poraali	Soori	Winner, Norway Tamil Film Festival Award for Best Comedian
2011	Gurusamy	Priest	Special appearance in the song "Thengaayil Nei"
2012	Sooriya Nagaram	Mechanic	
2012	Friends Book	"Millionaire" Venugopal	Telugu film
2012	Mattuthavani	Panneer's friend	
2012	Kandathum Kanathathum	Mukil's friend	
2012	Manam Kothi Paravai	Nalla Thambi	
2012	Pandi Oliperukki Nilayam	Soori	
2012	Paagan	Vellayangiri	Also playback singer ("Simba Simba")
2012	Sundarapandian	Murugesan	Nominated, Vijay Award for Best Comedian; Nominated, SIIMA Award for Best Comedian
2012	Kai	Siva's friend	
2013	Haridas	Kandasamy	
2013	Kedi Billa Killadi Ranga	Sindru	
2013	Chikki Mukki	Karuvaya	
2013	Thillu Mullu	Mano	
2013	Thulli Vilaiyadu	Mano	
2013	Desingu Raja	Surya	
2013	Varuthapadatha Valibar Sangam	Kodi	Winner, SIIMA Award for Best Comedian; Winner, Norway Tamil Film Festival Award for Best Comedian; Nominated, Vijay Award for Best Comedian
2013	Idharkuthane Aasaipattai Balakumara	Thambi	
2013	Naiyaandi	Soori	
2013	Pandiya Naadu	Ganesan	
2013	Vellai Desathin Idhayam	Rahim's friend	
2014	Jilla	Gopal	Nominated, SIIMA Award for Best Comedian
2014	Rummy	Arunachalam	
2014	Pulivaal	Chokku	
2014	Bramman	NBK	
2014	Nimirndhu Nil	Ramachandran	
2014	Maan Karate	"Tiger" Tyson	Guest appearance
2014	Nalanum Nandhiniyum	Sivabalan	
2014	Anjaan	Raja	
2014	Pattaya Kelappanum Pandiya	Muthupandi	
2014	Jeeva	"Senior" David	
2014	Poojai	Kutti Puli	
2014	Oru Oorla Rendu Raja	Mike	
2014	Vellaikaara Durai	Police Pandi	
2015	Sakalakala Vallavan	Chinnasamy	
2015	Paayum Puli	Murugesan	
2015	Kaththukkutti	Ginger	
2015	Vedalam	Laxmidas	
2015	Pasanga 2	Sanjay Ramasamy	Guest appearance
2016	Rajini Murugan	Thotathree	Nominated, SIIMA Award for Best Comedian
2016	Aranmanai 2	Devadas, Sandhu Bondhu Naadimuthu	
2016	Mapla Singam	Anbuchelvan's friend	
2016	Marudhu	Kokkarako	
2016	Idhu Namma Aalu	Vaasu	
2016	Velainu Vandhutta Vellaikaaran	Sakkarai	
2016	Angali Pangali	Chandra	
2016	Maaveeran Kittu	Thangarasu	
2016	Kaththi Sandai	Deva / Chithra Master	
2017	Si3	Veera Babu "Veeram"	
2017	Mupparimanam	Himself	Cameo appearance
2017	Saravanan Irukka Bayamaen	Kalyanam	
2017	Sangili Bungili Kadhava Thorae	Sooranam	Winner, Vijay Award for Best Comedian; Winner, SIIMA Award for Best Comedian
2017	Thondan	Ramar	Guest appearance
2017	Gemini Ganeshanum Suruli Raajanum	Suruli Rajan	
2017	Paakanum Pola Irukku		
2017	Savarikkadu	Master	
2017	Podhuvaga Emmanasu Thangam	"Tiger" Pandi	
2017	Katha Nayagan	Annadurai	
2017	Ippadai Vellum	Daivakolundhu	
2017	Nenjil Thunivirundhal	Ramesh	
2018	Sketch	Maari	
2018	Pakka	Bommai	
2018	Bhaskar Oru Rascal	Rocky	
2018	Kadaikutty Singam	Sivagamiyin Selvan	
2018	Seema Raja	Adiasamy (Kanakku/Maths)	
2018	Saamy Square	Sakthi	
2019	Kanchana 3	Govindan	
2019	Devarattam	Vetri's 4th brother-in-law	
2019	Vennila Kabaddi Kuzhu 2	Subramani	
2019	Kennedy Club	Subramani	
2019	Namma Veettu Pillai	Paramu	
2019	Sangathamizhan	Soori	
2021	Sarbath	Arivu's friend	
2021	Udanpirappe	Pakkadi	
2021	Annaatthe	Pachaikili	
2021	Velan	'Mamookka' Dineshan	
2022	Kombu Vatcha Singamda	Karthik	
2022	Anbulla Ghilli	Ghilli (voice)	Voice only
2022	Etharkkum Thunindhavan	Aavani Soolamani	
2022	Don	Perusu	
2022	Viruman	Kuthukal	
2022	Prince	Abroad Guy	Cameo appearance
2023	Viduthalai Part 1	Kumaresan	Debut as lead actor Winner, Ananda Vikatan Cinema Award for Best Actor; Nominated —Filmfare Award for Best Actor – Tamil
2024	Garudan	Sokkan	
2024	Kottukkaali	Paandi	
2024	Viduthalai Part 2	Kumaresan	
2025	Badava	Urappu	
2025	Maaman	Inba	Also Story Writer
2026	Mandaadi	Muthukaali	
2026	Yezhu Kadal Yezhu Malai	Train passenger	

=== Television ===
Year	Title	Role	Channel
2007-2008	Thirumathi Selvam	Amirtham	Sun TV
