= Krishnamoorthy (actor) =

Indian comedian (c.1963-2019)

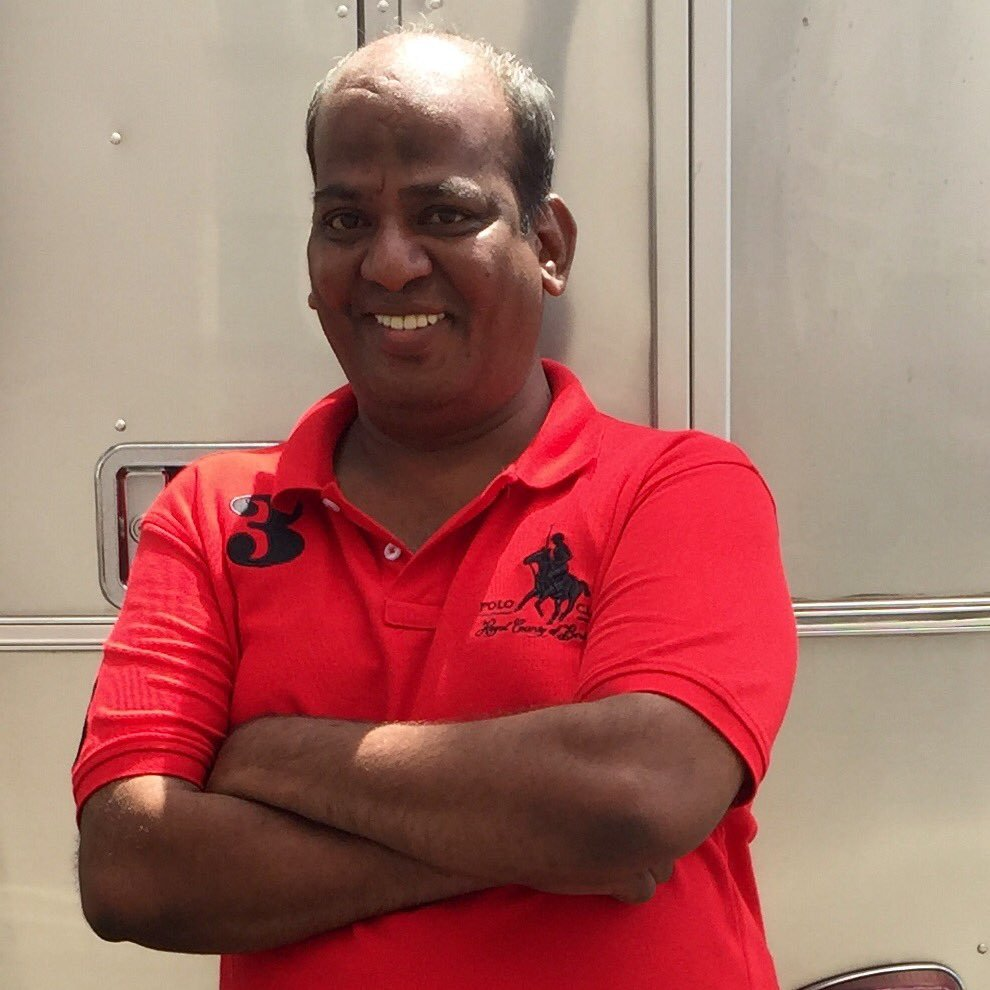
- Born: Krishnamoorthy; 1963 or 1964; Tiruvannamalai, Madras State (now Tamil Nadu), India
- Died: 7 October 2019 (aged 55); Kumily, Kerala, India
- Occupation: Actor
- Years active: 1999–2019

Krishnamoorthy (1963/1964 – 7 October 2019) was a comedian in the Tamil film industry in India.

== Career ==
Krishnamoorthy moved from his home town Tiruvannamalai to Madras (now Chennai) in 1983, hoping to become an actor in films. Despite being initially unsuccessful, he joined the crew of the film Kuzhandhai Yesu (1984) as an office boy, and by the end of production, he was assigned the role of production manager. He subsequently went on to work on several films and adverts as a member of the crew. As a result, he was initially credited in films as Manager Krishnamoorthy.

Krishnamoorthy made a breakthrough as a comedy actor through his role in Thavasi (2001), where he notably appeared in a scene where his character asks Vadivelu's character for directions to Osama bin Laden's and George W. Bush's residences in order to forge a peace treaty between both of them. He subsequently worked on several films in the 2000s as a comedian, often appearing in scenes alongside Vadivelu.

He later won critical acclaim for his portrayal of Murugan, a middle manager in a human trafficking group in Bala's Naan Kadavul (2009) and as a corrupt police constable in Mouna Guru (2011). Regarding his role in Yaanai Mel Kuthirai Sawaari, a critic noted that "there is an ice-cream seller played by Krishnamurthy who probably has got the meatiest role of his career".

== Death ==
He died in the early morning of 7 October 2019 of a heart attack in Kumily in Kerala, where he was shooting for the film Pei Mama directed by Sakthi Chidambaram. He was survived by his wife and two children.

== Filmography ==
- Thullatha Manamum Thullum (1999; credited as Mottai Krishnamoorthy)
- Pennin Manathai Thottu (2000)
- Thavasi (2001)
- Roja Kootam (2002)
- Raja (2002)
- Style (2002; credited as Comedian Kicha)
- Anbe Sivam (2003) (uncredited)
- Parthiban Kanavu (2003)
- Freaky Chakra (2003) (Hindi)
- Gambeeram (2004)
- Nee Mattum (2004)
- Amudhae (2005)
- Englishkaran (2005)
- Aanai (2005)
- Aaru (2005) (uncredited)
- Thalaimagan (2006)
- Sudesi (2006)
- Naalai (2006)
- Thiruvilaiyaadal Aarambam (2006)
- Poi (2006)
- Cheena Thaana 001 (2007)
- Deepavali (2007)
- Marudhamalai (2007)
- Vel (2007)
- Saroja (2008)
- Ellam Avan Seyal (2008)
- Naan Kadavul (2009)
- Guru En Aalu (2009)
- Vilai (2010)
- Va (2010)
- Magizhchi (2010)
- Mandhira Punnagai (2010)
- Siruthai (2011)
- Ilaignan (2011)
- Thoonga Nagaram (2011)
- Azhagarsamiyin Kuthirai (2011)
- Avan Ivan (2011)
- Three Kings (2011; Malayalam)
- Velayudham (2011)
- Vithagan (2011)
- Mounaguru (2011)
- Saguni (2012)
- Naan (2012)
- Maattrraan (2012)
- Onbadhule Guru (2013)
- Nagaraja Cholan MA, MLA (2013)
- Jannal Oram (2013)
- Jilla (2014)
- Tenaliraman (2014)
- Sigaram Thodu (2014)
- Thirudan Police (2014)
- Kaaka Muttai (2015)
- Purampokku Engira Podhuvudamai (2015)
- Nayyapudai (2016)
- Aviyal (2016)
- Ennul Aayiram (2016)
- Velainu Vandhutta Vellaikaaran (2016)
- Yaanai Mel Kuthirai Sawaari (2016)
- Brindavanam (2017)
- Kurangu Bommai (2017)
- Sketch (2018)
- Kadaikutty Singam (2018)
- Kudimagan (2019) (Last film)
- Kaithi (2019) (Posthumous film)
- Pei Mama (2021) (Posthumous film)
