= Vaiyapuri =

Indian actor

- Born: Ramakrishnan; 23 October 1968 (age 58); Theni, Madras State (now Tamil Nadu), India
- Occupation: Actor
- Years active: 1994–present
- Spouse: Anandhi
- Children: 2

Vaiyapuri (born 23 October 1968 as Ramakrishnan) is an Indian actor who has worked in Tamil-language films. He rose to fame by appearing in supporting roles in the late 1990s and early 2000s, often portraying supporting comedic characters. His first major role was in Balu Mahendra's Raman Abdullah (1997), while his roles in films including Thullatha Manamum Thullum (1999), Gemini (2002) and Mani Ratnam's Raavanan (2010) also garnered him acclaim.

== Career ==
In December 1986, Vaiyapuri moved from his hometown of Theni to Chennai hoping to become an actor in the Tamil film industry. Unable to immediately get a chance in films because of his skinny physical stature, he worked as a bearer at a hotel on Mount Road. Vaiyapuri's first break came through television serials on Doordarshan, where he notably worked on an adaptation of Sujatha's Kolaiyuthir Kalam. He started his film career appearing as an extra and then in minor roles in films, before making a breakthrough with his role in Balu Mahendra's comedy film Raman Abdullah (1997). The success of the film prompted several film makers to approach him for comedic roles in their projects, with the actor subsequently winning acclaim for his roles in Kadhal Palli (1997) and Kaathala Kaathala (1998), where he collaborated with actor Kamal Haasan. In the late 1990s, he continued appearing as a supporting actor, often portraying one of the several comedians in a film. His work in Thullatha Manamum Thullum (1999), where he portrayed a comedic role of a man slowly becoming a transgender woman, won him further critical acclaim.

Throughout his career, Vaiyapuri has often appeared in films starring Kamal Haasan and the actor selected Vaiyapuri for a major supporting role in the actor's Mumbai Xpress (2005). Vaiyapuri was later cast as a transgender woman in Mani Ratnam's Raavanan (2010), which he described as a "major turning point" in his career. He shot for the film alongside an ensemble cast including Vikram and Aishwarya Rai, with the film winning critical acclaim upon release. In 2010, he announced that he was set to play the protagonist in a film directed by newcomer Devindiran, while he had also shot for a Malayalam film titled Kalyanamam Kalyanam where he portrayed the second lead. However neither film eventually had a theatrical release. In the 2010s, Vaiyapuri was cast in less films as the Tamil film industry generally moved away from including separate comedy tracks in films. He has since worked on more low-budget films in supporting roles, while continuing to regularly collaborate in films starring Kamal Haasan such as Uttama Villain (2015) and Papanasam (2015).

In 2017, Vaiyapuri received media attention for taking part in the reality television show Bigg Boss hosted by Kamal Haasan. After spending 84 days in the house, he was evicted in a poll by the public.

== Filmography ==
Year	Title	Role	Notes
1994	Karuththamma	Bus conductor	
1994	Mani Rathnam		
1995	Chellakannu	Barber	
1995	Ilaya Ragam		
1996	Avvai Shanmughi	Flower decorator	
1997	Love Today		
1997	Kadhal Palli	Palli	
1997	Raasi	Narikuravar	
1997	Raman Abdullah		
1997	Ullaasam	Gopalu	Uncredited role
1998	Kaadhale Nimmadhi	Blind beggar	
1998	Maru Malarchi	Palli	
1998	Dhinamdhorum		
1998	Kaadhala Kaadhala		
1998	Ponnu Velayira Bhoomi		
1998	Jolly	Govind	
1998	Harichandra	Muthu	
1998	Sandhippoma	Hospital patient	
1998	Kalyana Galatta		
1998	Unnidathil Ennai Koduthen	Delhi	
1998	Sollamale	Painter	
1998	Kannedhirey Thondrinal	Dinesh	
1998	Senthooram		
1999	Thullatha Manamum Thullum	Kalyanasundaram aka Kalyani	
1999	Ninaivirukkum Varai		
1999	Kallazhagar	Govindankutti	
1999	Unnai Thedi	Vaiyapuri	
1999	Chinna Raja		
1999	Periyanna	Prisoner	
1999	Poomagal Oorvalam	Muniyandi	
1999	Suyamvaram	Potential groom	
1999	Nee Varuvai Ena		
1999	Amarkkalam	Mani	
1999	Anbulla Kadhalukku	Vengaipuli	
1999	Unakkaga Ellam Unakkaga	Gun Pandi	
1999	Maanaseega Kadhal		
1999	Ooty	Vaiyapuri	
1999	Sundari Neeyum Sundaran Naanum		
1999	Time	Servant	
1999	Unnaruge Naan Irundhal		
1999	Aasaiyil Oru Kaditham	Jambulingam	
1999	Hello	Chandru's friend	
2000	Good Luck		
2000	Hey Ram	Vedha	
2000	Sudhandhiram		
2000	Thai Poranthachu		
2000	Pennin Manathai Thottu	Mute servant	
2000	Simmasanam	Thangarasu's friend	
2000	Rhythm	Umbrella salesman	
2000	Ilaiyavan		
2000	Uyirile Kalanthathu	Siva's assistant	
2000	Priyamaanavale	Stepnee	
2000	Anbudan	Sathya's friend	
2000	Ennavalle	Charles	
2000	Parthen Rasithen	Bus driver	
2001	Paarvai Ondre Podhume	Guru	
2001	Dumm Dumm Dumm	Saami	
2001	Dhill	Udumalai	
2001	Sonnal Thaan Kaadhala		
2001	Poovellam Un Vasam	Durai	
2001	Veettoda Mappillai	Dhamu	
2001	Kadal Pookkal		
2001	Majunu	Vasanth's friend	
2001	Vadagupatti Maapillai		
2001	Piriyadha Varam Vendum	Sanjay's friend	
2002	Pammal K. Sambandam	Dili	
2002	Alli Arjuna	Meenatchi	
2002	Gemini	Oberoi	
2002	Ezhumalai	Marriage broker's assistant	
2002	Nettru Varai Nee Yaaro		
2002	Raja	Onan	
2002	Naina		
2002	En Mana Vaanil	Azhagusundaram	
2002	Arputham	Ashok's friend	
2002	Style	Manikkam	
2003	Military		
2003	Manasellam	Bala's friend	
2003	Nala Damayanthi	Ramji's cousin	
2003	Aahaa Ethanai Azhagu		
2003	Alaudin	Alaudin's friend	
2003	Vani Mahal		
2003	Kadhaludan	Marriage broker	
2003	Parasuram	Anjali's uncle	
2003	Anbe Un Vasam	Hussain	
2003	Enakku 20 Unakku 18	Train passenger	
2004	Jai	College Student	
2004	Adi Thadi		
2004	Arul	Arul's friend	
2004	Jana	Jana's servant	
2004	Maanasthan		
2004	Vasool Raja MBBS	Piles Patient	
2004	Arasatchi	Soosai	
2004	Attahasam	Kumbudren Saamy	
2004	M. Kumaran S/O Mahalakshmi	Velu	
2004	Super Da		
2005	Thirupaachi	Police Constable	
2005	Kadhal Seiya Virumbu	Dharma	
2005	Kadhal FM	Inspector	
2005	Kochi Rajavu	Shiva's friend	Malayalam film
2005	Mumbai Xpress	Johnson	
2005	Sivakasi	Sivakasi's childhood friend	
2005	Kannamma		
2005	Priyasakhi		
2006	Idhaya Thirudan		
2006	Vanjagan	Ravi	
2006	Vattaram	Burma's sidekick	
2006	Prathi Gnayiru 9 Manimudhal 10.30 Varai	Police officer	
2006	Azhagiya Asura		
2007	Pokkiri	Thamizh's friend	
2007	Deepavali	Villager	
2007	Nanbanin Kadhali		
2007	Adavadi	Michael	
2007	Arputha Theevu	Vaiyapuri	Tamil dubbed version
2007	Urchagam	Bhai	
2007	Vasantham Vanthachu	Somu	
2007	Vel	Mokkasami	
2007	Machakaaran	Vicky's friend	
2008	Sadhu Miranda	Kapoor	
2008	Tharagu		
2008	Dasavathaaram	Prabhu	
2008	Pandi	Thief	
2008	Kuselan	Kuppusamy's assistant	
2008	Nayagan		
2008	Keka	Police Inspector	Telugu film
2008	Nadigai		
2008	Thiruvannamalai	Thumbi Singaram	
2009	Villu	Pugazh's friend	
2009	Mayandi Kudumbathar		
2009	Unnai Kann Theduthe	Rudhra's friend	
2009	Naalai Namadhe		
2009	Munnar	Kanagavel	
2009	Thee	Rajapandiyan's sidekick	
2010	Thunichal		
2010	Irumbukkottai Murattu Singam	Viruma	
2010	Kola Kolaya Mundhirika	Constable Rajappan	
2010	Kanagavel Kaaka	Karuppu	
2010	Raavanan	Raasathi	
2010	Indrasena		
2010	Chikku Bukku	Singaram	
2010	Unakkaga En Kadhal	Tata Birla	
2010	Androru Naal		
2010	Neethana Avan	Venus	
2011	Kaavalan	Bhoomi's friend	
2011	Muthukku Muthaaga		
2011	Maapillai		
2011	Sabash Sariyana Potti		
2011	En Ullam Unnai Theduthey		
2011	Vellore Maavattam		
2011	Velayudham	Speed's brother	
2011	Osthe	Police Constable	
2011	Aduthathu		
2012	Ullam		
2012	Pandi Oliperukki Nilayam	Neighbour	
2013	Nagaraja Cholan MA, MLA		
2013	Ragalaipuram	Insurance policy agent	
2013	Alex Pandian	Nandu	
2013	Naankam Thamizhan		
2014	Enna Satham Indha Neram	Malayali tea stall owner	
2014	Bramman	Police inspector	
2014	Thirudan Police		Guest appearance
2014	Vellaikaara Durai	Land Broker	
2014	Amara		
2014	Ninaivil Nindraval		
2014	Nenjirukkumvarai Ninaivirukkum		
2015	Uttama Villain	Snake charmer	
2015	Papanasam	Restaurant owner	
2015	Maharani Kottai	Dhanakodi	
2015	Adhibar	Bobby	
2015	Savaale Samaali		
2016	Narathan	Baskar's assistant	
2016	Velainu Vandhutta Vellaikaaran	Constable Vasanthakumar	
2016	Vellikizhamai 13am Thethi	Saravanan's friend	
2016	Vendru Varuvaan		
2016	Thirumaal Perumai		
2016	Andaman		
2017	Aarambamey Attakasam		
2017	Veera Vamsam		
2018	Kalakalappu 2	Sathyamoorthy	
2018	Pakka		
2018	Annanuku Jai	Narayanan	
2019	Oviyavai Vitta Yaru		
2019	En Kaadhali Scene Podura		
2019	Love Action Drama	Doctor	Malayalam film
2019	Market Raja MBBS	Demo patient	
2020	Routtu		
2021	Pei Mama		
2021	Operation JuJuPi	Politician	
2022	Yutha Satham	Ambi	
2022	Viruman	Auctioneer	
2022	Kanam	Maari	
2022	Riya - The Haunted House		
2022	Aattral	Traffic Police	
2022	Powder	Saamy	
2023	Thalaikoothal	Transgender demigod	
2023	Jambu Maharishi		
2023	Kick	Ad council chief	
2023	Leo	Astrologer	
2023	Kapil Returns		
2023	License	Head constable	
2023	Va Varalam Va		
2024	Local Sarakku	Film director	
2024	Petta Rap	Janaki's uncle	
2024	Paraman	Sivanandi	
2025	Otha Votu Muthaiya		
2025	Kadaisi Thotta	Midhun	
2025	Yaman Kattalai		
2025	Thug Life	Midhun	
2025	Desingu Raja 2	Krishna	
2025	Others	Ganesan	
2025	Kaantha	Selvam	
2026	Vangala Viriguda		
2026	Aazhi		
2026	TN 2026	Alcoholic	
2026	Theeyor Koodam	Selvam	

== Television ==
Year	Show	Role	Network	Notes
2004-2007	My Dear Bootham	Kittu & Title Voice "Kalakkara Machi"	Sun TV	
2011	Asatha Povathu Yaaru?	Judge	Sun TV	
2017	Bigg Boss	Contestant	Star Vijay	Evicted Day 84
2017	Nandini	Himself	Sun TV	guest role
2018	Bigg Boss Tamil 2	Guest	Star Vijay	from day 85 to 91
2020	Magarasi	Rajendran	Sun TV	guest role
2021	Sundari	Kattam Kandhaswamy	Sun TV	guest role
2021	Gokulathil Seethai	Varudhukutty	Zee Tamil	guest role
2022	Amudhavum Annalakshmiyum		Zee Tamil	guest role
2023	Engga Hostel	Security guard	Amazon Prime Video	guest role
2026	Warrant: From the World of Vilangu	Dhanasekaran	ZEE5	
