= Desingu Raja =

2013 Indian film by S. Ezhil

- Theatrical release poster
- Directed by: S. Ezhil
- Written by: S. Ezhil; N. Rajasekhar (Dialogues)
- Produced by: P. Madan
- Starring: Vimal; Bindu Madhavi
- Cinematography: Sooraj Nallusami
- Edited by: Gopi Krishna
- Music by: D. Imman
- Production company: Escape Artists Motion Pictures
- Release date: 23 August 2013
- Country: India
- Language: Tamil

Desingu Raja is a 2013 Indian Tamil-language comedy film directed by S. Ezhil, and produced by P. Madan under the banner Escape Artists Motion Pictures. Starring Vimal and Bindu Madhavi, it also features Soori, Singampuli and Ravi Mariya, playing supporting roles. The film is set in two villages which are perpetually at conflict with one another.

The film had been extensively shot in Thanjavur, Kumbakonam and Chennai. The music is scored by D. Imman, while Sooraj Nallusami, and Gopi Krishna were the cinematographer and editor respectively. The film was released on 23 August 2013.

== Plot ==
Idhayakani, who hails from the village Kiliyoor near Palani, is a firm believer in nonviolence. The ongoing feud between his family and the family of Cheena Thaana from the neighboring village of Puliyoor is a source of constant worry for him. Though their rivalry began on a minor issue, many lives were sacrificed over the years. Idhayakani's father is killed by Cheena Thaana. Angered by his son's death, Idhayakani's grandfather retaliates by killing Cheena Thaana's son. Cheena Thaana vows to kill Idhayakani.

Meanwhile, Idhayakani meets Cheena Thaana's daughter Thamarai at a temple festival and falls deeply in love with her. Chaos ensues when both realize who their families are, and the respective sets of parents and villagers object to their romance. Idhayakani marries Thamarai at a temple, and Cheena Thaana gets killed by Idhayakani's grandfather's henchmen. Thus, Thamarai develops hatred towards Idhayakani for her father's death. According to Panchayat, Thamarai goes to Idhayakani's home with her family in order to kill Idhayakani, but they fail in their attempts. When Chitappa (Ravi Mariya) hears that Thamarai is pregnant, he is determine to kill her child, but Thamarai's uncle Surya tries to give strength tonic instead of poison to Thamarai, which makes her safe. In the climax, Kiliyoor organizes a Kabaddi match in Puliyoor. Chitappa arrives at the place by kidnapping Thamarai and her mother, but Idhayakani's uncle Koushik was kidnapped instead of Thamarai. It turns out that Surya had saved her. Chitappa arrives to kill Idhayakani, but the presence of cheerleaders makes him undergo a change of heart. He then dances to the tune of Gangnam Style and accepts Idhayakani wholeheartedly.

== Cast ==
- Vimal as Idhayakani
- Bindu Madhavi as Thamarai
- Soori as Suriya
- Singampuli as Koushik
- Ravi Mariya as Chitappa
- Gnanavel as Cheena Thaana
- Aadukalam Naren as Idhayakani's father
- Vinu Chakravarthy as Idhayakani's grandfather
- Vanitha Krishnachandran as Thamarai's mother
- Chaams as Idhayakani's friend
- Singamuthu as Suriya's friend
- Charle
- Vadivukkarasi
- Suzane George
- Muktha Bhanu (special appearance in the song "Nelavattam")
- Vennira Aadai Moorthy (special appearance in the song "Pom Pom")
- Swaminathan (special appearance in the song "Pom Pom")

== Production ==
After the success of Manam Kothi Paravai, director Ezhil started his next titled Desingu Raja, another rural comedy. He cast Vimal to play the lead character Idhayakani, named after a film starring M. G. Ramachandran, of whom the character was written as a fan. Bindu Madhavi was signed as the lead actress, pairing with Vimal for the second time after Kedi Billa Killadi Ranga (2013).

Sify reported that the film was nearly 50% complete in December 2012. Muktha Bhanu danced for one song along with Vimal and group dancers which was shot in Thiruvarur in March 2013. In May 2013 the crew shot a song sequence for 10 days with Vimal and Madhavi in a set resembling a fruit godown.

== Soundtrack ==
The soundtrack album for Desingu Raja is composed by D. Imman, in his second collaboration with Ezhil after Manam Kothi Paravai. The audio was released on 19 June 2013.

S. R. Ashok Kumar of The Hindu, gave a positive review stating "The music is mixed with a liberal dose of comedy". Karthik of Milliblog stated, "Imman-Ezhil’s combo’s signature style is evident and thoroughly enjoyable!"

Track listing

No.	Title	Singer(s)	Length
1.	"Ammadi Ammadi"	Shreya Ghoshal	05:06
2.	"Oru Ora Ora Paarvai"	D. Imman, Balram (singer)	04:53
3.	"Nelaavattam Nethiyile"	Harini, P. Unni Krishnan	04:28
4.	"Yaarume Kekkave Illa"	S. P. Balasubrahmanyam, El Fe Choir	04:44
5.	"Pom Pom"	Vijay Prakash	04:20
6.	"Ammadi Ammadi" (Karaoke)	Instrumental	05:03
7.	"Oru Ora Ora Paarvai" (Karaoke)	Instrumental	04:50
8.	"Nelaavattam Nethiyile" (Karaoke)	Instrumental	04:25
9.	"Yaarume Kekkave Illa" (Karaoke)	Instrumental	04:42
10.	"Pom Pom" (Karaoke)	Instrumental	04:17
Total length:			47:02

== Release ==
Desingu Raja was originally slated to release on 15 August 2013, but it got postponed to 23 August. The film was released in over 300 screens across Tamil Nadu.

== Reception ==
Rediff.com gave the film 2 1/2 out of 5 stars and stated, "The unconvincing storyline may not hold your attention, also some unfunny comic elements in the film will not certainly keep you entertained throughout". Deccan Herald wrote: "It's an unambitious film on a mission to entertain its viewers with full-length comedy. Honestly, it doesn't succeed in its mission because the forced humour does not even works for a few minutes, but after a while it really tests your patience". The Times of India gave it 2 1/2 out of 5 stars and stated "You will not like this film if you are looking for a rural comedy that feels fresh and funny". Baradwaj Rangan wrote for The Hindu, "Desingu Raja is about the union of a couple from feuding villages, but it’s really a cautionary tale about making movies with no jokes and no script".

== Sequel ==
A sequel, Desingu Raja 2, again directed by Ezhil and starring Vimal, was released on 11 July 2025.
