= Velainu Vandhutta Vellaikaaran =

2016 Indian Tamil-language comedy film directed by Ezhil

- Theatrical release poster
- Directed by: S. Ezhil
- Written by: S. Ezhil
- Produced by: Vishnu Vishal; Rajini Natraj; S. Ezhil
- Starring: Vishnu Vishal; Nikki Galrani
- Cinematography: Shakthi
- Edited by: Ananda Lingakumar
- Music by: C. Sathya
- Production companies: Vishnu Vishal Studioz; Ezhilmaaran Production
- Distributed by: Fox Star Studios
- Release date: 3 June 2016
- Running time: 132 minutes
- Country: India
- Language: Tamil

Velainu Vandhutta Vellaikaaran (transl. He is a Englishman when it comes to work) (Note: "Vellaikaaran", literally translating to "white man", refers to Caucasian men, especially Englishmen.) is a 2016 Indian Tamil-language screwball comedy film written and directed by S. Ezhil and produced by Vishnu Vishal for Vishnu Vishal Studios, Ezhil and Rajan Natraj for Ezhilmaaran Production alone with Fox Star Studios. The film stars Vishnu and Nikki Galrani. Featuring music composed by C. Sathya, the film began production in August 2015, and ended that December. It had a worldwide release on 3 June 2016. The film won two Tamil Nadu State Film Awards: Best Comedy Actor (Robo Shankar) and Best Playback Singer Female (Vaikom Vijayalakshmi).

== Plot ==
Murugan is the right-hand man of the local MLA Jacket Janakiraman. During a mass-marriage function organised by Jacket, eight grooms and a bride out of the 25 couples to be married go missing due to the efforts of Jacket's archenemy MLA Maurdhamuthu. Murugan manages to get seven grooms and a bride back, but a groom is still missing. To save Jacket's reputation, he asks his best friend Sakkarai to pretend to marry Pushpa, a local dancer and item girl who is known to everyone in the village, despite being betrothed to Hamsavali. Unfortunately for Sakkarai, a photo showing him marrying Pushpa is published in the tabloids and goes viral on social media, forcing Hamsavali to break her engagement with Sakkarai unless he divorces Pushpa. Sakkarai asks Pushpa to sign the divorce notice, but she refuses to sign unless Sakkarai brings Jacket in front of her and tells her to do so. To add to Sakkarai's woes, Pushpa even moves in with him.

Meanwhile, Murugan falls in love with Archana, the daughter of a restaurateur whose main ambition is to become a police officer. Archana's father finds out about Murugan's association with Jacket and asks him to give ₹10 lakhs to Jacket so that his daughter could become a sub-inspector. He also asks him not to tell Archana as she wants to get the job in an honest way. Later that day, Jacket goes to the hospital to visit Minister Shanmugasundaram, who is on his deathbed. Before dying, Shanmugasundaram tells him about the ₹5 billion that he acquired illegally, but he wants him to use it for good purposes. Jacket's brother-in-law Bhootham also wants the money, but for his own benefit. He chases Jacket on his way home to find out the location where the money is kept, but Jacket meets with an accident during the chase and develops amnesia, while also behaving like a 10-year old.

Archana eventually gets the job, but on merit and not through recommendation. Thinking that Murugan had cheated her father, she immediately ordered him to give back the money, failing which he would be imprisoned. Murugan and Sakkarai find out about Jacket's condition but manage to get him discharged from the hospital. They train him to tell Archana that he has received the money from Murugan and to tell Pushpa to sign the divorce notice so that both their problems will be solved. Unfortunately, their plan backfires completely as Jacket tells Pushpa what he was supposed to tell Archana, making Pushpa realise that Jacket has lost his memory and refuses to sign the divorce notice. Jacket also inadvertently gets caught in the middle of a protest against Marudhamuthu and is eventually kidnapped by Bhootham and his men. Murugan is caught at the scene of the kidnapping and is arrested by Archana.

At Bhootham's hideout, Jacket irritates him and his men with his childish behaviour. In a fit of rage, Bhootham kicks Jacket, making him unconscious, but Jacket regains his memory after gaining consciousness, much to Bhootham's happiness. Bhootham then asks him where the money is hidden. Jacket, however, starts telling all the events of the day he met Shanmugasundaram and keeps repeating the story from the beginning whenever he is interrupted, much to Bhootham's irritation. At this juncture, Murugan and Archana, who have both found out that Bhootham has kidnapped Jacket, arrive. Murugan manages to stop Jacket's repetition, getting him to tell in front of Archana that he did receive the money, but since DGP Sathasivam, whom he was supposed to pay the bribe, refused to accept it, he gave the money to a contractor. Jacket also says that he has managed to convince Pushpa to sign the divorce notice. He then reveals the location of the money to Bhootham, which is stored in an abandoned mansion called Noor Mahal. Murugan, Archana, Sakkarai, Jacket, Bhootham, and even Marudhamuthu, who has also found out about the money, go to the mansion. A fight ensues between them over the money, which ends with Murugan and Jacket successfully getting it, while the bad guys get killed by the ghosts in the Noor Mahal.

In the end, with all problems solved, Murugan and Archana enter into a romantic relationship, while Sakkarai is to marry Hamsavali during another mass-marriage function organised by Jacket, but before Sakkarai can tie the thali around Hamasavali's neck, the priest asks him if he is Pushpa's husband, to which he accidentally says yes, causing Hamsavali to stop the wedding.

In a mid-credit scene, the bad guys have turned into ghosts and have joined the ghost gang ruled by Mottai Guru.

== Cast ==
- Vishnu Vishal as Murugan
- Nikki Galrani as Sub-Inspector Archana
- Soori as Sakkarai "Pushpa Purushan"
- Robo Shankar as MLA Jacket Janakiraman
- Reshma Pasupuleti as Dancer Pushpa
- Aadukalam Naren as MLA Marudhamuthu
- Ravi Mariya as Bhootham
- Rajendran as Ghost 'Mottai' Guru
- Gnanavel as Archana's father
- Vittal as Shanmugasundaram
- Vaiyapuri as Constable Vasanthakumar
- Krishnamoorthy as Sakkarai's uncle
- Venkat Subha as DGP Sathasivam
- Swaminathan as Bartender
- Sonia as Sengamalam
- Saravana Subbiah as Doctor
- Ashvin Raja
- Bava Lakshmanan as Abishek
- Maran
- Vengal Rao as watchman
- Risha Jacobs as Item Dancer of "Aaravalli Suravalli"
- Nikesh Ram as Doctor (guest role)

== Production ==
S. Ezhil signed on Vishnu to portray the lead role in the film during June 2015 and held discussions with Keerthy Suresh and Taapsee Pannu about portraying the lead female role, though neither of the pair signed on. Nikki Galrani later accepted to work on the film and production began during August 2015. In late December, towards the end of filming, Galrani suffered a hairline fracture to her right hand during a karate chop sequence. By the end of the month, the title was revealed as Velainu Vandhutta Vellaikaaran. Ezhil said the title was a reference to a Tamil proverb about the apparent devotion of Englishmen towards their work.

== Soundtrack ==
Velainu Vandhutta Vellaikaaran

Soundtrack album by C. Sathya
- Released: 6 May 2016
- Recorded: 2016
- Genre: Soundtrack
- Length: 24:28
- Label: Think Music India
- Producer: C. Sathya

C. Sathya chronology
Kanchana 2 (2015)	Velainu Vandhutta Vellaikaaran (2016)	Unnodu Ka (2016)

Music was composed by C. Sathya. The soundtrack feature four songs, the lyrics for which are written by Yugabharathi.

All tracks are written by Yugabharathi.

Track listing
No.	Title	Singer(s)	Length
1.	"Aaravalli"	Vaikom Vijayalakshmi, Mahalingam	4:08
2.	"Kutheeti"	Sathyaprakash	4:13
3.	"Papparamittai"	Sreerama Chandra Mynampati	3:54
4.	"Ayyo Paavam"	Jayamoorthy	4:00
5.	"Kutheeti" (Karaoke)		4:13
6.	"Ayyo Paavam" (Karaoke)		4:00
Total length:			24:28

== Reception ==
Anupama Subramanian of Deccan Chronicle wrote "The first half moves at a predictable manner and slow, post interval, it picks up momentum with continuous laughs". M Suganth of The Times of India wrote "What VVV lacks mainly is a solid script that holds our attention in the time between these comic stretches. And that is where Ezhil fails. But given how boring and lazy his last couple of films have been, especially when it comes to scripting, this film is quite an improvement". Baradwaj Rangan wrote for The Hindu, "The script for a comedy is still a script. You may think up some good gags, but you still have to figure out what to do around those gags". Gautaman Bhaskaran of Hindustan Times wrote, "Nobody can have misgivings over Tamil cinema’s plot novelty, but often the treatment lacks cinematic maturity. Ezhil’s Velainu Vandhutta Vellaikaaran could have been a delightful spoof or even a satire on present-day India with its rampant rottenness in the police force and the administration, but the film is allowed to slip into a mindless mess". S. Saraswathi of Rediff.com wrote, "At 2 hours and 20 minutes, the film seems painfully long and tedious. There are some brief moments of fun, but the humour seems mostly forced and the narrative scarcely moves forward".

== Other versions ==
Despite already being dubbed and released in Telugu as Prema Leela Pelli Gola (2017), the film was remade in the same language as Silly Fellows (2018).
