= Manam Kothi Paravai =

2012 Indian film by S. Ezhil

- Theatrical release poster
- Directed by: S. Ezhil
- Written by: S. Ezhil
- Produced by: Ambeth Kumar; Ranjeev Menon; S. Ezhil
- Starring: Sivakarthikeyan; Athmeeya
- Cinematography: Sooraj Nallusami
- Edited by: Gopi Krishna
- Music by: D. Imman
- Production company: Olympia Movies
- Release date: 1 June 2012
- Country: India
- Language: Tamil

Manam Kothi Paravai (transl. The heart's woodpecker) is a 2012 Indian Tamil-language romantic comedy film written and directed by S. Ezhil. The film stars Sivakarthikeyan and Athmeeya, while Vennira Aadai Moorthy, Ilavarasu, Singampuli, Soori and Srinath play supporting roles. The music is composed by D. Imman with cinematography by Sooraj Nallusami and editing by Gopi Krishna. The film was released on 1 June 2012. It was remade in Kannada as Anjada Gandu (2014) and in Telugu as Vinavayya Ramayya (2015).

== Plot ==
Kannan is a carefree youth who assists his father Ramaiah in his construction business and spends time with his friends. He is in love with his neighbour Revathy, whose father and uncles are the most dreaded goons in the village. They are both childhood friends. Kannan gets a shocker when he decides to reveal his love to Revathy. Her family has arranged her a marriage with an influential man. To avoid the arranged marriage, Kannan's friends from Mumbai kidnap Revathy. However, in a complete twist, Revathy declares she has no romantic interest in Kannan and at first says he is just a friend, but she later reveals that she loves Kannan too, so much so that if others knew it, it would be a problem to him and prove to be a risk to his life. Meanwhile, the bride-to-be's family searches frantically to find their girl. They get hold of Kannan and his friends. Revathy and Kannan are separated. After two years, Kannan returns from Oman after having worked as a site engineer there, to meet his love. He meets her with avidity, and they talk for a while when she asks him to leave immediately for fear that her father would harm him. Kannan, still a passionate lover, asks Revathy if they could marry, now that she is not married to anybody else. Revathy's father barges in unexpectedly and asks Kannan to leave the house, but with Revathy.

== Cast ==
- Sivakarthikeyan as Kannan Ramaiah
- Athmeeya as Revathy
- Vennira Aadai Moorthy as Nair's grandfather
- Ilavarasu as Ramaiah
- Singampuli as Modu Mutti
- Soori as Nalla Thambi
- Srinath as Nair
- Chaams as Das, Kannan's friend
- M. R. Kishore Kumar as Radha, Kannan's friend
- Ravi Mariya as Natraj, Revathy's brother
- Aadukalam Naren as Revathy's father
- Sampath Ram as 'Mathoor' Narayanan, Revathy's proposed groom
- Vanitha Krishnachandran as Thirumathi Ramaiah
- Sugunthan as the landlord
- Supergood Subramani as the tea master

== Production ==
Ambeth Kumar and Ranjeev Menon are friends of director Ezhil. When they asked him how the filming of Manam Kothi Paravai was proceeding, he made them listen to the songs composed by D. Imman. Impressed, they decided to produce it. Athmiya made her Tamil debut with this film. The film was primarily shot in Ezhil's native place Kayathur, and Sivakarthikeyan's native Thiruveezhimizhalai. While filming a scene where the female lead's handkerchief was essential, the actual handkerchief was missing, so the makers shot with a men's handkerchief. Later, an assistant director produced the intended handkerchief and revealed he had been embroidering it with a heart design.

== Soundtrack ==
The music of Manam Kothi Paravai was composed by D. Imman. The lyrics for all the songs were written by Yugabharathi. "Dang Dang" is the first film song by Maalavika Sundar, previously a Carnatic singer. Imman chose her to sing the song after watching one of her performances on the reality series Super Singer.

The soundtrack album was released on 11 April 2012. Karthik from Milliblog said "Manam Kothi Paravai's soundtrack surpasses anything that composer Imman has produced so far, including his most famous soundtrack, Mynaa. The tunes and music he puts together here demonstrate a maturity not seen in the composer's work so far and makes for fantastic listen."

Track listing
No.	Title	Singer(s)	Length
1.	"Jal Jal Jal Osai"	Aalap Raju, Surmukhi Raman	04:47
2.	"Po Po Po"	Javed Ali	04:49
3.	"Dang Dang"	Saisharan, S. Malavika	04:25
4.	"Yenna Solla"	Vijay Prakash, Chinmayi	04:26
5.	"Ooraana Oorukkulla"	Santhosh Hariharan	04:18
6.	"Po Po Po" (Karaoke)	–	04:49
7.	"Jal Jal Jal Oosai" (Karaoke)	–	04:45
8.	"Dang Dang" (Karaoke)	–	04:22
Total length:			36:41

== Critical reception ==
Malathi Rangarajan from The Hindu said, "MKP is a comedy it turns serious and when you settle down for the drama, matters turn ludicrous. Consistency in treatment is a casualty". Sify said "On the whole the film fails to deliver". M. Suganth of The Times of India gave the film 2.5 out of 5 and said "Ezhil seems to have tried to do a Kalavani here but those familiar with his repertoire will realize he is more comfortable with melodrama". Malini Mannath of The New Indian Express said the film was "A romantic comedy low on humour".
