= Madhan Bob =

Indian actor (1953–2025)

- Born: S. Krishnamoorthy; 19 October 1953; Madras, Madras State, India
- Died: 2 August 2025 (aged 71); Adyar, Chennai, Tamil Nadu, India
- Occupations: Actor; comedian
- Years active: 1984–2025
- Spouse: Susheela
- Children: 2

S. Krishnamoorthy (19 October 1953 – 2 August 2025), professionally known as Madhan Bob, was an Indian actor and comedian, appearing in many Tamil films in supporting roles. Madhan Bob was known for his amusing facial expressions, laughter and protruding eyeballs, inspiration for which he took from Kaka Radhakrishnan. He appeared in the popular Sun TV comedy show Asatha Povathu Yaaru? as one of the judges.

== Early life ==
Madhan was named by his parents as Krishnamoorthy. He was born on 19 October 1953 as the eighth child in his family. Madhan insisted that he had sufficient time to engage in self learning by honing skills and mastering his craft and body language including self-hypnotism. He had revealed that he wanted to maximise the learning capacity from his younger days by plying his trade playing musical instruments in order to keep himself busy and occupied. He also learnt other facets such as yoga and heavyweight boxing. He also reportedly dealt with issues pertaining to stammer, but he himself redeemed himself from the stuttering largely due to his sound knowledge of self-hypnotism.

== Career ==
Madhan also ventured into different career paths including serving as a medical representative and then serving in as a sales officer for a reasonable stint. He later quit his job as a sales officer in order to embark on opportunities in music arena. He also crossed paths meeting veteran musicians S Ramanathan, Harihara Sharma and ‘Vikku’ Vinayakaram from whom he gained mentorship and guidance in order to learn the techniques of western classical and carnatic music. Madhan had spent devoted majority of his time committing himself to broadcast music shows, songs for advertisements, dramas, radio commercials and serials. It is also believed that by the time Doordarshan had commenced its operations in Chennai in 1975, he became the first individual to play guitar on the channel. He also once served as a mentor to esteemed renowned musician A. R. Rahman, which was also confirmed by the latter himself during the music composition and audio launch of the film Thenali (2000). He later pursued his career in acting, mainly in supporting roles and Madhan was a part of consecutive silver jubilee movies and hence he was nicknamed ‘sentiment artist' by the Tamil film fraternity.

== Illness and death ==
Madhan had been affected by cancer and was said to have recovered after receiving treatment, but died on 2 August 2025, at the age of 71.

== Filmography ==
- All films are in Tamil, unless otherwise noted.

Year	Title	Role	Notes and Ref.
1984	Neengal Kettavai		Uncredited
1985	Idaya Kovil	Music conductor	Uncredited
1992	Vaaname Ellai	Paa. Dhi. Pandiyan	
1992	Thevar Magan	Lawyer Kesavan	
1993	Jaathi Malli	Sathyam	
1993	Enga Thambi	Sharma	
1993	Uzhaippali	Cloth shop owner	
1993	Udan Pirappu		
1993	Thiruda Thiruda	K. B. S.	
1994	Magalir Mattum		
1994	Honest Raj	Varadharajan's PA	
1994	Pattukottai Periyappa	Office Manager	
1994	Nammavar	Naidu	
1994	May Maadham	Ramasamy	
1995	Sathi Leelavathi	Rukmaangathan	
1995	Pullakuttikaran		
1995	Maa Manithan	Police inspector	
1996	Poove Unakkaga	Director Kaada	
1996	Sundara Purushan		
1996	Tamizh Selvan		Uncredited
1996	Vetri Mugam		
1996	Priyam		
1997	Gopura Deepam		
1997	Mannava		
1997	Vivasaayi Magan		
1997	Thaali Pudhusu		
1997	Nandhini	Rangabashyam	
1997	Pagaivan	Judge	
1997	Nerrukku Ner	Ganeshan	
1997	Ratchagan	Priya's husband	
1997	Roja Malare		
1997	Arasiyal	Vishnu	
1997	Chachi 420		Hindi film
1998	Thulli Thirintha Kaalam	Bank Manager	
1998	Rathna		
1998	Kaathala Kaathala	Registrar	
1998	Jolly	Anitha's father	
1998	Priyamudan	Priya's uncle	
1998	Unnidathil Ennai Koduthen	Mahadevan	
1998	Ellame En Pondattithaan	Sethu	
1998	Aasai Thambi		
1998	Unnudan		
1999	Thullatha Manamum Thullum	Dr. Ganesh	
1999	Unnai Thedi	Ramakrishnan	
1999	Ethirum Puthirum		
1999	Anantha Poongatre		
1999	Suyamvaram	The priest	
1999	Nee Varuvai Ena	Kesavan	
1999	Poovellam Kettuppar	Rathavelu	
1999	Minsara Kanna	Vedhachalam's henchman	
1999	Jodi	Music store owner	
1999	Unakkaga Ellam Unakkaga	Inspector Kalyanaraman	
2000	Kannukkul Nilavu	Belgium	
2000	Thai Poranthachu	Lalsan	
2000	Sandhitha Velai		
2000	Unnai Kann Theduthey		
2000	Ilaiyavan	Bharathi's father	
2000	Kuberan		
2000	Thenali	"Diamond" Babu	
2000	Anbudan	Press reporter	
2001	Friends	Manager Sundaresan	
2001	Looty	Lawyer	
2001	Rishi	Seth	
2001	Sonnal Thaan Kaadhala		
2001	Pennin Manathai Thottu	Madhan	
2001	Star	Ramanathan's assistant	
2001	Azhagana Naatkal	Doctor	
2001	Paarthale Paravasam	Kamal Haasan's fan	
2001	Alli Thandha Vaanam		
2001	Manadhai Thirudivittai	Principal	
2002	Red	Aaruchamy	
2002	King		
2002	Punnagai Desam	Music director of a carnatic program	
2002	Pammal K. Sambandam	Srivilliputhur Kulasekara Periyasamy (S.K.P.)	
2002	Kamarasu		
2002	Gemini	R. Anilwal IPS	
2002	Varushamellam Vasantham	Latha's father	
2002	Krishna Krishna	Singapal Sooranakesari	
2002	Yai! Nee Romba Azhaga Irukey!	Mani	
2002	Anbe Un Vasam	Professor	
2002	Youth	Interviewer	
2002	Run	Ticket examiner	
2002	Sundara Travels	Moneylender	
2002	Namma Veetu Kalyanam	College Principal	
2002	Kadhal Azhivathillai	Principal	
2002	Villain	Sundaramoorthy's assistant	
2002	Mutham	Unnikrishnan	
2003	Kadhaludan		Guest appearance
2003	Pallavan		
2003	Pavalakkodi		Uncredited
2003	Nala Damayanthi	Ramji's cousin	
2003	Priyamaana Thozhi		
2003	Thithikudhe	Sivaraman	
2003	Three Roses		
2003	Anbe Un Vasam	Professor	
2003	Indru	Minister's P.A	
2004	Thendral	Venkatrama Iyer	
2004	Jairam		Tamil version of Telugu film Jai.
2004	Kadhal Dot Com		
2004	Aethirree	Bike store owner	
2004	Campus	Professor	
2004	Ennavo Pudichirukku		
2004	Vasool Raja MBBS	Mani Raja	
2004	Karkaa Kasadara	Settu	
2004	Chatrapathy		
2004	Giri	Veeraabaghu's neighbor	
2005	Ayyaa	Kesavan	
2005	Chandramukhi	Car owner	
2005	6′.2″		
2005	Jithan	Dr. S. Manicham	
2005	ABCD	Anand's uncle	
2005	Mazhai	Idi Ameen	
2005	Bambara Kannaley		
2005	Kundakka Mandakka	Roopa's father	
2006	Aathi	Taxi Driver	
2006	Sudesi	Dr. Kannadasan	
2006	Bangaram	Punjabi	Telugu film
2006	Jery	Janaki's father	
2006	Parijatham		
2006	Kusthi		
2006	Jambhavan	Doctor	
2006	Kedi	College Principal Madan Bob	
2006	Varalaru	Coffee shop owner	
2007	Manikanda		
2007	Periyar	Musician performing Kathakalakshepam	
2007	Thottal Poo Malarum	Vaandaiyar's brother-in-law	
2007	Marudhamalai	Doctor	
2007	Nam Naadu	Sena	
2007	Mudhal Mudhalai		
2007	Thavam	Subramaniam's boss	
2007	Vel	Lawyer Sundaram	
2008	Vedha	College Principal	
2008	Arai En 305-il Kadavul	Professor Mani	
2008	Seval	Pasudesan	
2009	Thee	A Man who never casts vote	
2009	Ananda Thandavam		
2009	Bhramaram	Policeman	Malayalam film
2009	Engal Aasan		
2009	Ainthaam Padai	Devasena's father	
2010	Sura	Poornima's father	
2010	Pen Singam	Police Constable	
2011	Kaavalan	College lecturer	
2011	Maapillai	Rajeshwari's assistant	
2011	Eththan		
2011	Singam II	School Principal	
2011	Yuvan Yuvathi		
2012	Aathi Narayana	Ramkumar	
2013	Pathayeram Kodi	Police Officer	
2013	Celluloid	P. U. Chinnappa	Malayalam film
2013	Chandhamama	Amudham newspaper employee	
2013	Ethir Neechal	Kunjithapatham's manager	
2013	Saravanan Engira Surya		
2013	Thulli Vilayadu		
2014	Ramanujan	Prof. Krishna Shastri	
2014	Aindhaam Thalaimurai Sidha Vaidhiya Sigamani	Dr. Tippu Sultan MBBS	
2014	Jamaai		
2014	Poriyaalan	Civil Engineering Professor	
2014	Lingaa	Merchant	
2014	Vellaikaara Durai	Malaysia Madhavan	
2015	En Vazhi Thani Vazhi	Doctor	
2015	Adhibar	Pankaj Lal Settu	
2016	Saagasam	Madhu's father	
2016	Tea Kadai Raja		
2016	Ka Ka Ka Po		
2016	Ennama Katha Vudranunga		
2016	Tamilselvanum Thaniyar Anjalum	Office Manager	
2016	Uchathula Shiva		
2016	Kaththi Sandai	Doctor	
2016	Ner Mugam		
2017	Motta Shiva Ketta Shiva	Jaanu's brother-in-law	
2017	Vaigai Express	Paavaadaisaamy	
2017	Saravanan Irukka Bayamaen	Curtain Sharma	
2017	Ivan Thanthiran		
2017	Ullam Ullavarai		
2018	Nagesh Thiraiyarangam		
2018	Pattinapakkam	Psychologist	
2019	Market Raja MBBS	Nagesh Babu	
2019	50/50		
2021	Call Taxi		
2021	Tughlaq Durbar	Ayushman Sait	Cameo appearance
2021	Dikkiloona	Mani's father	
2022	Dha Dha		
2023	Ghosty		
2023	August 16 1947		
2023	Kick	Businessman	
2024	Boomer Uncle	Nesam's father	Special appearance
2024	Raayan		
2024	Vasco Da Gama	Superintendent K. Subash	
2025	Yaman Kattalai		
2026	Sweety Naughty Crazy	Doctor	Posthumous film
2026	Breakfast	Veera Babu	Posthumous film

=== Television ===
Year	Title	Role	Channel	Notes and Ref.
2005	Kalakka Povathu Yaaru?	Judge	Star Vijay	
2007–2011	Asatha Povathu Yaaru?	Judge	Sun Tv	
1990	Nam Kudumbam	A Neighbour	Doordarshan	
