= S. Michael Rayappan =

Indian politician

Member of the Legislative Assembly
- In office 16 May 2011 – 21 February 2016
- Preceded by: M. Appavu
- Succeeded by: I. S. Inbadurai
- Constituency: Radhapuram

Personal details
- Born: 19 March 1963 (age 63) Nandhankulam, Tirunelveli district, Tamil Nadu
- Party: Desiya Murpokku Dravida Kazhagam (2011 - 2016)
- Profession: Film Producer; Politician

Siluvai Michael Rayappan (born 19 March 1963) is an Indian politician and former Member of the Tamil Nadu Legislative Assembly from the Radhapuram constituency. He represented the Desiya Murpokku Dravida Kazhagam party. He is also a film producer and has produced such films like Nadodigal, Pattathu Yaanai, Eetti, and Miruthan under Global Infotainment's banner.

== Career ==
After producing the commercially successful films Nadodigal (2009), Thenmerku Paruvakaatru (2010), Goripalayam (2010), Pattathu Yaanai (2013), and Eetti (2015), Rayappan produced Anbanavan Asaradhavan Adangadhavan (2017), a disaster at the box-office. Several months after the film's release, Rayappan criticised the unruly behaviour of film's lead actor Silambarasan for disrupting the film's shoot.

== Filmography ==
Year	Film	Director	Cast	Notes
2009	Nadodigal	Samuthirakani	M. Sasikumar, Bharani, Vijay Vasanth, Abhinaya, Ananya	
2010	Goripalayam	Rasu Madhuravan	Vikranth, Harish, Ramakrishnan, Raghuvannan, Prakash	
2010	Sindhu Samaveli	Samy	Harish Kalyan, Amala Paul	
2010	Thenmerku Paruvakaatru	Seenu Ramasamy	Saranya Ponvannan, Vijay Sethupathi, Vasundhra Chiyertra	
2011	Aadu Puli	Vijay Prakash	Aadhi, Prabhu, Poorna	
2012	Aayiram Muthangaludan Thenmozhi	Shanmugaraj	Venkatesh, Akshara	
2013	Pattathu Yaanai	Boopathy Pandian	Vishal, Aishwarya Arjun, Santhanam	
2014	Oru Oorla Rendu Raja	R. Kannan	Vimal, Priya Anand, Soori	
2015	Eetti	Ravi Arasu	Atharvaa, Sri Divya	
2016	Miruthan	Shakti Soundar Rajan	Jayam Ravi, Lakshmi Menon	
2017	Anbanavan Asaradhavan Adangadhavan	Adhik Ravichandran	Silambarasan, Shriya Saran, Tamannaah	
2019	Kee	Kalees	Jiiva, Nikki Galrani, Anaika Soti, Govind Padmasoorya	
