= GGM =

GGM may refer to:

- Gabriel García Márquez (1927–2014), Colombian author
- Geita Gold Mine of northern Tanzania
- Generic group model in cryptography
- Goodness Gracious Me (disambiguation)
- Gora Ghuma railway station in India; see List of railway stations in India
- Gordon growth model, a method for valuing a company's stock
- Grindelwald–Männlichen gondola cableway, in Switzerland
- Ground-to-ground missile
- Gugu Mini language of the Paman languages of Australia (ISO 639 code: ggm)
- Guru Kalyan, Indian film music composer
- Gwangju Global Motors, automobile manufacturing plant in South Korea
- Kakamega Airport, Kenya
