= Goripalayam =

- Theatrical release poster
- Directed by: Rasu Madhuravan
- Written by: Rasu Madhuravan
- Produced by: S. Michael Rayappan
- Starring: Vikranth; Harish; Ramakrishnan; Raghuvannan; Prakash; K. P. Jagannath; Poongodi; Swasika
- Cinematography: Bala Bharani
- Edited by: Suresh Urs
- Music by: Sabesh–Murali
- Production company: Global Infotainment
- Release date: 7 May 2010
- Country: India
- Language: Tamil

Goripalayam is a 2010 Indian Tamil-language action drama film written and directed by Rasu Madhuravan and produced by S. Michael Rayappan. The film features an ensemble cast of Vikranth, Harish, Ramakrishnan, Raghuvannan, Prakash, K. P. Jagannath, Poongodi, and Swasika. The music was composed by Sabesh-Murali with cinematography by Bala Bharani. The film released on 7 May 2010.

== Plot ==
Azhagar, the son of police constable Moovendhan, is drawn to bad habits after witnessing his father's reckless behavior in his younger days. Azhagar's friends, A to Z and Iluppu Murugan, are orphans, and Murugan is struggling with drug addiction. Another friend, Sangu Ganesan, is separated from his family after his parents' separation. Azhagappan, who has completed his college degree, is supporting his friends financially as the son of a hotel owner. These five friends lead a carefree life, committing petty crimes, loitering during the day, drinking at night, and spending time with two elderly associates: Chinnasamy aka Goripalayam MGR, and Retired Rowdy.

Meanwhile, Kazhuvanadhan, an elderly businessman, has two sons: Viruman, a womanizer; and Karutha Pandi, who runs a usury business, using physical force to collect unpaid loans. When Azhagar's elder brother attempts suicide after losing office money, Azhagar sets out with his friends to track down the thief and recover the lost funds in Palanganatham. Their mission escalates into a conflict with another moneylender when they witness him torturing a family. The situation worsens when they stab one of the moneylender's men, who turns out to be Viruman's relative. The moneylender manipulates the situation, making it seem like Azhagar's gang is behind Viruman's younger sister, Viji. Coincidentally, Karutha Pandi sees Viji with Azhagar's gang and, believing she is involved with them, beats her. Azhagar is in love with Parvathy, his sister-in-law's sister, and his family arranges their marriage.

However, after the wedding, Azhagar discovers that Parvathy was actually in love with Azhagappan. Realizing his mistake, Azhagar removes the thali and sends Parvathy to Azhagappan. This decision angers Azhagar's family, and they permanently chase him out of the house. Meanwhile, A to Z falls in love with Poomayilu after a series of bitter encounters. They share an intimate moment when Poomayilu invites him to her home when her parents are away. To marry Poomayilu, who comes from a wealthy background, A to Z and his friends plan to loot a house to gather the necessary funds. Unbeknownst to them, the target house belongs to Viruman. Although their plan fails, Viruman catches a glimpse of Azhagar's face before they escape. Mistaking that Azhagar had an affair with his sister Viji, Viruman kills Viji. Azhagar and his friends are shocked by this turn of events. The situation worsens when Kazhuvanadhan spots the friends and gets pushed off the road by A to Z, resulting in his death.

Viruman and Karutha Pandi vow to avenge their father's death by killing Azhagar's gang. Fearing for their lives, Azhagar, A to Z, Murugan, and Ganesan flee Madurai. They seek refuge at Ganesan's former mother's place and later at Azhagar's sister Vijaya's home, where they face humiliation. During their stay, they encounter Azhagappan and Parvathy, who struggle with poverty after being renounced by their families. Meanwhile, Poomayilu informs A to Z through Chinnasamy that she is pregnant. After confirming that they are not suspected of Kazhuvanadhan's murder, they return to Madurai. Meanwhile, Retired Rowdy arranges A to Z's marriage to Poomayilu. In parallel, Viruman, seeking revenge, hires a contract killer named Paandi from Mathichiyam. Paandi, who kills to support his younger brother Senthil's education after his father's death due to usury, has a code of ethics and grants his victims a final wish. At A to Z's wedding, Paandi arrives with Viruman to eliminate them. The four friends flee for their lives. However, Paandi's men capture Ganesan and cut off his hand, while Paandi kills A to Z. Poomayilu is devastated by A to Z's death.

Determined to avenge their friend, Azhagar, Murugan, and Ganesan set out to kill Viruman and Karutha Pandi. They first eliminate Karutha Pandi and then, with Rani's help, lure Viruman into a trap. After an intense fight, the three friends successfully bury Viruman alive. Azhagar selflessly arranges for Murugan to care for Poomayilu, and they leave. Meanwhile, Azhagar's mother passes away due to jaundice. Unaware of this, Azhagar returns home and is devastated to learn of her death. Overwhelmed by the loss, and just as he is grieving, Paandi arrives to kill him. Azhagar requests a brief moment to mourn his mother's death, and after being granted some time, Paandi ultimately kills him. In a poignant twist, Paandi's own life unravels when he witnesses Senthil's accidental death, despite his efforts to secure wealth through contract killings. Realizing the futility of his violent path, Paandi decides to reform.

The film concludes with Poomayilu, Murugan, and Ganesan learning of Azhagar's demise and lamenting his loss. Meanwhile, Moovendhan is filled with regret, acknowledging that his irresponsible parenting contributed to Azhagar's downfall. The film ends with Azhagappan performing Azhagar's last rites.

== Cast ==
- Vikranth as Paandi
- Harish as Azhagar
- Ramakrishnan as A to Z
- Raghuvannan as Azhagappan
- Prakash as Iluppu Murugan
- K. P. Jagannath as Sangu Ganesan
- Poongodi as Poomayilu
- Swasika as Parvathy
- Jagarthi Agarwal as Vijayalakshmi "Viji"
- Ravi Mariya as Viruman
- Nandha Periyasamy as Karutha Pandi
- Alex as Kazhuvanadhan
- Ilavarasu as Moovendhan, Azhagar's father
- Singampuli as Chinnasamy "Goripalayam MGR"
- Mayilsamy as Retired Rowdy
- Rajkapoor as Viruman's relative, a moneylender
- Manobala as the bride's father
- Sujibala as Rani
- Rekha Suresh as Azhagar's mother
- Kalloori Hemalatha as Vijaya, Azhagar's sister
- Jayalakshmi as Azhagar's sister-in-law
- Raneesh as Paandi's gang member
- Laksha as a dancer in the song "Otta Odasal"

== Production ==
Vikranth, cousin brother of actor Vijay, chose to do this film as he wanted to carve his own identity, and had grown tired of being compared to his cousin in earlier films due to his acting style.

== Soundtrack ==
Soundtrack was composed by Sabesh–Murali.

Title	Singer(s)	Length
"Siriki Vadi En Chittu"	Krishnaraj, Ramakrishna, Bhagyaraj, Archana, Geetha	03:40
"Otta Odasal"	Sabesh–Murali, Janani	05:04
"Oonjal Aadi"	Sathya	06:00
"Enna Indha Maatramo"	Karthik, Srimathumitha	05:34
"Azhagu Katteri"	Surjith, Vijitha (Lyrics: Tamilamudhan)	05:17
"Aariraro Kettadhillai"	Vijay Yesudas	05:59
"Aapakari Aapakari"	Murali, Senthildass Velayutham, Shyam, Mimicry Senthil	04:48

== Reception ==
Sify wrote "Like all? made in Madurai? films, it is another gory tale that traces the story of four youngsters who have gone astray due to parental neglect at an early age. [..] Madurai films seems to be losing steam as the subject and treatment is the same in film after film since Sasikumar?s pathbreaking Subramaniapuram happened in 2008". The New Indian Express wrote "There is no freshness in the script, the narration too lacklustre. There are too many characters, and a huge star cast, none of them making any impact". Malathi Rangarajan of The Hindu wrote, "The idea isn't new, nevertheless it's relevant", commenting on its similarities to Subramaniapuram and Maathi Yosi (2010), and criticising the "noisy" background music but praising the songs and some of the cast performances.
