= Maanaadu =

- Theatrical release poster
- Directed by: Venkat Prabhu
- Written by: Venkat Prabhu; K. Chandru; Ezhilarasu Gunasekaran
- Produced by: Suresh Kamatchi
- Starring: Silambarasan; S. J. Suryah
- Cinematography: Richard M. Nathan
- Edited by: Praveen K. L.
- Music by: Yuvan Shankar Raja
- Production company: V House Productions
- Distributed by: SSI Productions
- Release date: 25 November 2021
- Running time: 147 minutes
- Country: India
- Language: Tamil
- Box office: ₹117 crore

Maanaadu (transl. Public Conference) is a 2021 Indian Tamil-language science fiction political action thriller film directed by Venkat Prabhu and produced by Suresh Kamatchi. The film stars Silambarasan as a man who is stuck in a time loop and repeatedly relives the day that Tamil Nadu's Chief Minister is assassinated at a political rally. The ensemble cast which includes S. J. Suryah, Kalyani Priyadarshan, Manoj Bharathiraja, S. A. Chandrasekhar, Y. G. Mahendran, Karunakaran, Premgi Amaren, Aravind Akash and Anjena Kirti.

The film was officially announced in July 2018. However, due to Silambarasan's unprofessional behaviour, which caused an extensive pre-production work, the producer ousted the actor in August 2019. The issues were resolved in November 2019, with principal photography commencing in February 2020. It was shot in Chennai, Pondicherry, Yercaud, and Hosur. Despite being affected twice due to restrictions related to the COVID-19 pandemic in India, filming wrapped by July 2021.

Maanaadu was released on 25 November 2021 in theatres, and was a critical and commercial success.

== Plot ==
Abdul Khaliq, an NRI from Dubai, is travelling via flight to Coimbatore from Delhi, to reach Ooty. He intends to help his friend Eswaramoorthy elope with his lover Zarina Begum on the day of her marriage with the help of their other friend Syed Basha. His co-passenger Seethalakshmi introduces herself as the groom's friend in Zarina's wedding. The next afternoon, they elope and escape from the wedding with the bride's family in pursuit. On the way to the registrar's office, an unknown man suddenly falls on their car and is severely injured.

The man, Rafiq, is revealed to have been pursued by cops headed by Inspector John. They are subsequently captured on the orders of Dhanushkodi, the corrupt DCP. Khaliq is forced by Dhanushkodi and John to attend a political gathering led by Chief Minister Arivazhagan and is instructed to shoot Arivazhagan with a pistol while Dhanushkodi threatens to kill his friends. Khaliq reluctantly shoots Arivazhagan. John shoots Khaliq dead in the ensuing chaos.

Upon being killed, Khaliq awakens to find himself mid-flight earlier that day shortly before he met Seethalakshmi. After attempting to help Eswaramoorthy elope again, he finds himself in the same spot where the police had previously accosted him. Khaliq is shocked to encounter Rafiq again, this time unscathed. Rafiq enters his car attempting to flee the police. The police catch up to them and Khaliq is shot dead by Dhanushkodi this time. Awaking mid-flight again, Khaliq attempts to avoid interacting with the police, but this time is killed by Zarina's brother Mansoor. He finally realises that he is trapped in a time loop.

Khaliq explains the matter to his friends and Seethalakshmi, who tells him about the stories of time looping and Ujjain's Kaal Bhairav, the Hindu god of time. Khaliq realises how he, having been born in Ujjain in Kaal Bhairav's temple, might be behind the time loop (Khaliq looping at the same spot is the result of the aircraft flying over Ujjain at that moment) and that he has to clear a set objective to escape the loop. Khaliq begins investigating the political gathering once again and sees a cameraman shoot at Arivazhagan with a disguised sniper rifle. Using the time loop to his advantage, Khaliq locates the hitman and restrains him to prevent the assassination. However, Arivazhagan is killed in an IED bombing while leaving the gathering.

Khaliq confronts Dhanushkodi and laments that Arivazhagan's assassination would lead to a dangerous religious riot and cause further societal conflict. Dhanushkodi, who has also been stuck in a time loop when his blood accidentally transfused into a wounded Khaliq in one of the previous loops, realises that Khaliq dying resets the time loop every time and prevents him from achieving his goal of causing a religious riot.

Dhanushkodi is revealed to be working for Paranthaman, a veteran aide of Arivazhagan, who is unhappy with the nepotism inside his party. Paranthaman wants to get to power by assassinating Arivazhagan and Dhanushkodi expects to benefit from such a transfer of power by orchestrating the assassination. Khaliq is given a final warning by Dhanushkodi to stay away from his assassination and resets the loop. He attempts to warn Arivazhagan's son Mugilan of the impending assassination. In the process, he is captured by Paranthaman. Khaliq eventually figures out Tamizhvanan, a local Hindu figurehead already knew of Paranthaman's plans to assassinate Arivazhagan. Tamizhvanan was killed earlier that day.

On knowing Arivazhagan and Tamizhvanan are close, Khaliq realises that he needs to save Tamizhvanan and get him to ask Arivazhagan to prevent the gathering. After many futile attempts and near-misses, Khaliq successfully kidnaps Tamizhvanan and convinces him about Arivazhagan's impending assassination. With his help, Khaliq manages to meet and convince Arivazhagan that an assassination was being planned by showing a video where Tamizhvanan asks Arivazhagan to trust Khaliq.

Arivazhagan confronts Paranthaman by acting like he is suffering from sudden palpitation. He is convinced that Khaliq is telling the truth after Paranthaman pleads for him to attend the conference. A fight ensues between Khaliq and Dhanushkodi. Mugilan is shot, but successfully calls the guards. Paranthaman attempts to suffocate Arivazhagan, but is killed by Khaliq. Dhanushkodi tries to kill Arivazhagan but Khaliq takes the bullet, saving him. Dhanushkodi is killed by the guards.

Khaliq wakes up in the hospital, having seemingly ended his time loop. Arivazhagan thanks Khaliq for saving his life and explains that Paranthaman's death was written off as a cardiac arrest for political reasons. Later, Seethalakshmi, having been convinced by Khaliq that he is a RAW agent, helps his friends in kidnapping Zarina and they all arrive at the hospital while being chased by Mansoor and his men. Khaliq stands up to face Mansoor, who lunges at him.

In the post-credits scene, Khaliq awakens to find the time loop has still not ended.

== Cast ==
- Silambarasan as Abdul Khaliq
- S. J. Suryah as DCP Dhanushkodi IPS
- Kalyani Priyadarshan as Seetha Lakshmi
- S. A. Chandrasekhar as CM Arivazhagan
- Manoj Bharathiraja as Inspector John Mathew
- Y. G. Mahendran as Paranthaman
- Vagai Chandrasekhar as Tamizhvanan
- Premgi Amaren as Eswaramoorthy
- Karunakaran as Syed Basha
- Subbu Panchu as Mugilan Arivazhagan
- Anjena Kirti as Zarina Begum
- Udhaya as Mansoor
- Aravind Akash as the hitman
- Daniel Annie Pope as Muhammad Rafiq
- Stunt Silva as Masthan Bhai
- Badava Gopi as MP Manickka Vinayagam
- Baala as Thirunavukarasu, Dhanushkodi's assistant
- Arun Mohan as Irfan
- Kiruba as Rafiq's mother
- Mahat Raghavendra as Traffic cop (cameo appearance)

The bus stand portrait of late actor Manivannan is featured in the film as Kalaiselvanar, the predecessor of Arivazhagan in his political party.

== Production ==
=== Development ===
In August 2016, Venkat Prabhu announced that he would be collaborating with Silambarasan for a future project. In June 2018, producer Suresh Kamatchi of V House Productions, officially confirmed their next venture with Silambarsan and Venkat Prabhu. The project was revealed to be an action thriller. On 9 July 2018, Venkat Prabhu announced the title of the film as Maanadu, with a poster release, revealing that the film will be based on political backdrop. Venkat Prabhu added that the film would be a political thriller, his first attempt at the genre. The film, however, uses this as a subplot for the film whilst the story revolves around time loop.

Despite few developments in the project, in August 2019, Suresh Kamatchi announced that he had ousted Silambarasan from the film citing the actor's failure to commit to dates properly, although the film had undergone pre-production work for close to a year before Silambarasan's exit. The producer claimed that the film will go on production with another actor in the lead role, while Silambarasan later chose to launch another new project titled Maghaa Maanaadu immediately after his removal from Maanaadu. Suresh Kamatchi, along with several other producers came forward with an official complaint to the Tamil Film Producers Council about Silambarasan's poor punctuality during the same month. In November 2019, the producers announced that Silambarasan would come back to the project after sorting out the issues, and the project was expected to be re-launched.

=== Casting ===
With the film's cast and crew not being announced yet, it was rumoured that A. R. Rahman was being approached to compose the music and P. C. Sreeram being hired as the cinematographer. In January 2019, Raashii Khanna, was in talks to play the female lead, however Kalyani Priyadarshan was later cast. In June 2019, Yuvan Shankar Raja, who is known for his successful collaborations with Silambarasan and Venkat Prabhu, signed in as the composer.

In January 2020, the makers announced the complete cast and crew, which includes S. A. Chandrasekhar, Bharathiraja, Premgi Amaren and Karunakaran, along with cinematographer Richard M. Nathan, editor Praveen K. L., action director Stunt Silva and costume designer Vasuki Bhaskar, being a part of the project. Furthermore, the team also included S. J. Suryah, Manoj Bharathiraja, Daniel Annie Pope and Y. G. Mahendran, to the film's cast. Prabhu initially wanted Arvind Swamy to play the DCP Dhanushkodi, but he could not allot dates, resulting in Suryah being cast. Silambarasan was reported to play a Muslim in the film, whose character name was revealed as "Abdul Khaaliq" with a poster release on Silambarasan's birthday, 3 February 2020. It is a reference to Abdul Haliq, the legal name of Yuvan Shankar Raja following his conversion to Islam in 2014. Badava Gopi joined the film's sets during the filming schedule in Pondicherry in November 2020.

=== Filming ===
Principal photography commenced on 19 February 2020 with a puja being held on Chennai, where the team planned to few scenes in the venue and move to Hyderabad for a 40-day schedule. Following the accident held on the sets of Indian 2, the producer Suresh Kamatchi had assured an insurance of ₹30 crores to the film's cast and crew, also ensuring the safety of the workers on the film sets. On 27 February 2020, the team moved to VGP Golden Beach at Chennai, for a song shoot featuring Silambarasan which was choreographed by Raju Sundaram, was being filmed at a huge set with around 200 dancers from Mumbai and Bangalore.

The team later moved to Ramoji Film City at Hyderabad on 11 March for the film's second schedule. However, the film council in Hyderabad declined permission to shoot the film until 19 March for safety reasons due to the COVID-19 pandemic, thus the film's shooting being put on hold. Later the shooting of the film resumed at Pondicherry on 9 November 2020, with Silambarasan joining the sets post the completion of his film Eeswaran (2021). The schedule took place for a month and was completed within 9 December 2020. The team headed to Yercaud on 25 December 2020, to shoot major sequences without featuring Silambarasan.

A huge set was erected at the EVP Film City in Chennai, resembling a political gathering, and several lead stars were part of this schedule. The set works began in mid-February 2021 and took place for more than a month. Venkat Prabhu revealed that it was a challenging one to shoot a sequence with lot of artistes involved during this pandemic situation. He further added that the team planned to shoot this sequence in a quick time, citing the rise of COVID-19 infections in Chennai following the hot weather in the city. The shooting of the schedule was wrapped up on 5 April 2021, and then planned for another sequence to be filmed in Maldives airport, but was delayed further since the government had imposed ban on passengers from India arriving in the country due to surge in COVID-19 cases. After the statewide lockdown due to second wave of COVID-19 pandemic, the team later shifted to Hosur Aerodrome on 6 July 2021 for the final schedule and filming was completed on 9 July 2021. The production team planned to shoot the entire film in 85 days, but filming was completed within 68 days.

=== Post-production ===
In September 2021, according to a report, the film "is shot in several locations, with a huge political gathering scene in the film, it requires almost 900 computer graphic shots". Silambarasan started dubbing for the film in May 2021, earlier before the post-production works, with the dubbing took place in his home studio. In mid-October 2021, Premgi Amaren completed dubbing for his portions for the film. The following day, S. J. Suryah started dubbing for his portions in the film and completed within five days. However, it was reported that Silambarasan refused to dub for the portions in the film, citing pending remuneration. Suresh Kamatchi, assured Silambarasan to pay him ₹2 crore (US$210,000) as the remainder, which convinced the actor, and had completed dubbing for the remaining portions of his film, within a day. Yuvan started re-recording for the film's music and score in August 2021, which was completed within early-October 2021. The final copy of the film was submitted to the Central Board of Film Certification and was received U/A certificate (in concern of few action sequences) with a runtime of 147 minutes.

== Themes and influences ==
Following the official teaser, which released on Silambarasan's birthday (3 February 2021), netizens and fans of the actor claimed uncanny comparisons have been made to that of the American film Tenet (2020), directed by Christopher Nolan, as the frames from the teaser had made the use of reverse editing, as it deals with reverse-time formula. However, Venkat Prabhu refused such claims saying that it has no connection to that film. In the trailer, it was revealed that the film is based on a time loop concept (a common trope used in science-fiction films), where two characters were forced to repeat the same day after an unfortunate incident. It is the second Indian film to deal with the concept of time loops after Jango, released earlier the same year. Prabhu acknowledged Groundhog Day (1993) and Vantage Point (2008) as influences on Maanaadu.

Apart from time-loop, the film explores the concept of on Islamophobia, the demolition of the Babri Masjid, and how Muslims are being alienated. It was reported to normalise Muslim identity and mount opposition to anti-Muslim rhetoric and prejudice. Silambarasan said in February 2021, "I have faith in God but not any particular religion. Generally, there is a misconception about Muslims in society and I wanted to do something to change it. Maanaadu will clear the misconception about the religion and its followers".

== Music ==
The film's soundtrack is composed by Yuvan Shankar Raja, after regularly collaborating with Venkat Prabhu and Silambarasan. The soundtrack album consists of seven tracks — only two songs, titled "Meherezylaa" and "Voice of Unity" (the latter was used as a promotional song and not featured in the film), and few instrumentals used in the background score were released along with the album. The track "Meherezylaa" was released on the occasion of World Music Day (21 June 2021), with the entire cast and crew being present at the Twitter Spaces to launch the track from the album. The promotional song "Voice of Unity" was released at an event held in Chennai. The soundtrack album was released by U1 Records on 7 November 2021, to positive response.

== Release ==
=== Theatrical ===
Maanadu was reportedly scheduled for a theatrical release on 14 May 2021 (Eid-al-Fitr) but due to the extensive post-production activities the film's released was postponed to August 2021, which was further delayed due to the COVID-19 restrictions. On 11 September 2021, it was announced that the film would be released in five Indian languages on 4 November 2021, during Diwali. Suresh Kamatchi said that the extensive visual effects work delayed the post-production process, thereby resulting in the film being scheduled for release on that date.

However, on 18 October 2021, he announced that the film will be postponed to 25 November 2021, in order to ensure a wider release and large number of screens being provided for the film, thereby avoiding clash with Annaatthe (2021), which also scheduled for release on the same day. The decision was made to avoid losses for the stake holders involved, according to Suresh Kamatchi. Furthermore, the issues revolving over the film's copyrights and Silambarasan's refusal to dub for the film, citing his pending remuneration, were the reasons for the delay.

=== Distribution ===
The Tamil Nadu theatrical rights were acquired by Subbiah Shanmugham of SSI Productions. Seyons International acquired the rights for distributing the film in regions such as United States, Canada, United Kingdom, Europe, Australia and Africa. Scandinavian Tamil Media Group AS acquired the rights for distributing the film in countries such as Norway, Sweden and Denmark. DMY Productions and BMN acquired the theatrical marketing rights in Malaysia and Sri Lanka regions. United India Exports purchased the distribution rights in Singapore and Gulf regions respectively.

In mid-November, it was reported Great India Films will distribute the film in the United States. The theatrical rights in Kerala, were purchased by Mukesh R. Mehta of E4 Entertainment. AV Media Consultancy purchased the Karnataka theatrical rights, while UFO Moviez acquired the distribution rights in North India.

=== Home media ===
The post-theatrical streaming rights of the film were bought by SonyLIV, and it began streaming there from 24 December 2021, four weeks after the film's theatrical premiere. Initially, Kalaignar TV was reported to acquire the satellite rights, but it was later sold to Star Vijay.

== Controversies ==
=== Legal issues from TFPC ===
T. Rajendar and Usha Rajendar, Silambarasan's parents, filed a police complaint against the Tamil Film Producers Council for the film's postponement, over the issues revolving Anbanavan Asaradhavan Adangadhavan (2017). It was reported that one of the members from the council demanded Silambarasan to compensate the losses incurred by the film's producer Michael Rayappan after its failure, and they even tried to send death threats to the actor, if he releases the film without refunding the dues. They also warned that they might stage protests outside the office of Chief Minister of Tamil Nadu, M. K. Stalin, if the perpetuators stop the film's release.

At the pre-release event held in November 2021, Silambarasan gave an emotional speech referring to his controversies concerning both his personal and professional life, as many producers in the past few months, have filed complaints against the actor at the South Indian Film Chamber of Commerce over multiple issues. In the event, he said that "I've faced a lot of problems in the past few months. But, I will take care of them. You guys [fans] should take care of me".

=== Financial problems ===
On 24 November 2021, a day before the film's scheduled release, Suresh Kamatchi announced that the film had been postponed due to undisclosed reasons. It received a shocking response from the actor's fans and trade industry sources, as the film had a tremendous response at the pre-sale bookings in advance, and analysts believed that the film will be the "biggest opener for Simbu at the box office". The night of the same day, DMK MLA Udhayanidhi Stalin, had arranged a meeting with the producers and financiers to clear the dues, which was eventually solved quick and the film was released as scheduled. Despite financial settlements being done, the film's early morning shows, scheduled for 5:00 A.M. were cancelled as the Key Delivery Message (KDM) did not arrive in time, as planned and the first show began at 8:30 A.M.

=== Satellite rights ownership issue ===
In December 2021, T. Rajendar filed a case regarding the price negotiations of satellite rights, where he had claimed the ownership for the same name. In his complaint, it has been stated that he was involved in sorting out the release issues of the film and had apparently signed a guarantee letter to take responsibility for the amount that needed to be paid to Chand. Both the parties have agreed upon Rajendar taking responsibilities for the remainder to be paid after negotiating deals for satellite and digital streaming rights. But the deal was negotiated without his consent, where he was not present during the price negotiation. In response, the Tamil Film Active Producers Council, headed by Bharathiraja, condemned Rajendar's actions for claiming the film's satellite rights as a "very false precedent and questioned that how can a guarantor apply for a license for the property and also asked whether it is fair for a reputable artist in the film industry". The association strongly claimed that no one is in charge of a traditional business organisation.

=== Protests from Bharatiya Janata Party ===
The Bharatiya Janata Party's minority wing opposed the film claiming that it portrays Muslims in bad light and asked the Chief Minister to ban it. The affair ended with BJP's Tamil Nadu state president Annamalai K restraining BJP cadres and members from making further claims (or) criticism of the film, calling it a harmless entertainment film made with good intentions and sealed the issue.

== Reception ==
=== Box office ===
On the opening day of its release, the film crossed ₹14 crore (US$1.5 million) in Tamil Nadu. In the Chennai city box-office, the film collected ₹3.2 crore (US$330,000). The film earned US$100,000 (₹77 lakh) from preview shows in United States held on 24 November, a day before the film's release in India. At the second day, the film earned around ₹16 crore (US$1.7 million) in Tamil Nadu. In the third and fourth day, the film made ₹17 crore (US$1.8 million) and ₹18 crore (US$1.9 million) in Tamil Nadu, respectively, thereby making the first weekend collection to be around ₹65 crore (US$6.7 million). The film was considered to become a profitable venture, as it achieved break-even within four days of its release.

=== Critical response ===
Maanaadu received highly positive reviews from critics.

M. Suganth of The Times of India gave 4 out of 5 stars and wrote "Venkat Prabhu superbly Indian-ises the time loop concept and delivers an edge-of-the-seat masala movie. After the set-up, the film moves at a breakneck pace, hardly letting go of either momentum and drama." Srivatsan S. of The Hindu stated that, "[Venkat Prabhu] takes a mainstream Hollywood trope and converts it into a masala film, thereby making the final product look refined [...] Part of the reason why Maanaadu is thrilling is because, in essence, it is good masala that hides behind the facade of time-loop". Sudhir Srinivasan of Cinema Express wrote "Maanaadu has two stars—TR Silambarasan and SJ Suryah—and no duets, love stories, punch dialogues, or why, even fight sequences that threaten your suspension of disbelief. Venkat Prabhu reposes his faith squarely in the joys emergent from the time-loop idea and brings out an ace each time. Every time Khaaliq dies and gets reborn, the story explores a new idea. And yet, Venkat Prabhu manages to tie all these iterations and their events into a clever mystery that must be solved by Khaaliq, one step at a time." Ranjani Krishnakumar of Film Companion wrote, "Maanaadu is entertaining not because the two leads are smart, but because they are ridiculously ordinary [...] Maanaadu is not the best sci-fi film you'll ever see. In fact, it's hardly the genre film. It's a mainstream film that uses a sci-fi trope for its convenience."

Haricharan Pudipeddi of Hindustan Times praised the film, saying that "Maanaadu highly enjoyable is that each iteration of the same scene is presented in a way that it isn't boring and there's something new to offer to the viewers each time. Another interesting perspective is that the time loop is told from the hero's point of view in the first half and from the villain's standpoint post interval. SJ Suryah as the antagonist is unbelievably good. Very few actors can so effectively make even over-the-top performances stand out, and Suryah is brilliant throughout the movie. The scenes in which he's trying to understand why he's stuck in a time loop while trying to get a grip over reality leaves the audiences in splits." Manoj Kumar of The Indian Express gave 3.5 out of 5 stars and wrote "Director Venkat Prabhu has several catchy ideas and has engagingly strung them together. The endless loop and the seemingly endless efforts of the protagonists to get out of the time trap has an innate novelty to it. You respond to such movies like many characters in these films as if you are watching such a concept for the first time. We don't get bothered by the last film with the same theme as long as the current movie is enjoyable." Vivek of Deccan Herald rated 3.5 out of 5 stars and wrote "Maanaadu doesn't begin extraordinarily but once it gets into its groove, it doesn't have dull moments. Full marks to Venkat for cleverly using a complicated concept in a 'masala film' template and emerging a winner." Sowmya Rajendran of The News Minute gave 4 out of 5 stars and wrote "The film's willingness to respect the audience's intelligence is charming."

Sify gave 3.5 out of 5 stars and wrote, "Maanaadu has a few minor flaws, but the film is engaging and entertaining with a high concept core theme" with the final verdict as "A time loop film for the masses." Bharat Kumar of News Today called the film, "Touted as a political thriller, the movie has enough elements to engage the audience. With Silambarasan back in the scheme of things and a strong antagonist in SJ Suryah, Venkat Prabhu has won the battle before it begins." Sujatha Narayanan of The Quint wrote "Maanaadu is that film for Venkat Prabhu where the film's potential for a super-hit was written large in the first look poster itself [...] The ingenuity of the writing and direction lies in making a Nolan-esque film accessible to the common man."

IANS gave 3 out of 5 stars and wrote "Venkat Prabhu masterfully narrates a time-loop story in such a way that there is no room for boredom. Right from the time Abdul disembarks from the plane, the story picks up pace and there is no looking back. Venkat Prabhu's narration is so good that you don't mind sequences being repeated.". Akshay Kumar of DT Next gave 3.5 out of 5 stars and wrote, "The film is not without flaws, the reason why Silambarasan is stuck in a time-loop could have been better and why SJ Suriya is stuck along with Simbu in the loop is not clear. With the fast-paced screenplay you will forgive and forget the logic loopholes and enjoy the film which is the actor's best since Vinnaithaandi Varuvaayaa (2010) and Venkat Prabhu's best since Mankatha (2011)."

== Legacy and Impact ==
Maanaadu received unanimous praise from celebrities with Rajinikanth appreciating Venkat Prabhu for the unique concept and making. Later, Sivakarthikeyan appreciated the team and also congratulated Prabhu for his "neat execution" in the film. Director S. Shankar took to Twitter to appreciate the film and Prabhu for the concept, he further heaped praise on the technical departments as "everyone was at their best", calling the film as "an entertaining and new experience for Tamil cinema". Praveen Sudevan of The Hindu compared the similarities for Maanaadu with that of Master (2021) and Doctor (2021), as both the films have "solid antagonists", noting that S. J. Suryah's character Dhanushkodi, a ruthless cop "outwits the protagonist for most of the film" and added that "his performance equally contributed to the film's success as Silambarasan's". He further heaped praise on Prabhu for "putting the hero and the villain on a level playing field". Maanaadu was further listed as one of the best Tamil films of 2021, by news articles, which include: Firstpost (Ashameera Aiyappan), The Indian Express (Manoj Kumar R.), The News Minute (Sowmya Rajendran) and Hindustan Times (Haricharan Pudipeddi).

== Sequel ==
Following the success of the film, on 30 November 2021, Venkat Prabhu confirmed a sequel to the film with Silambarasan and S.J. Suryah returning. Prabhu added that the basic plot revolves around Khaliq going back to the loop resulting in Dhanushkodi returning to life.

== Remakes ==
In January 2022, Suresh Productions acquired the film's remake rights in all other Indian languages as well as the dubbing rights of the film in Telugu version for ₹12 crore (US$1.2 million). In March, Venkat Prabhu said he planned to direct both the Hindi and Telugu remakes simultaneously with different star casts.

== See also ==
- List of films featuring time loops
