= Veerasamar =

Indian art director and film actor

- Born: Usilampatti, Madurai, India
- Occupations: Art director, Actor
- Years active: 2005–present

Veerasamar is an Indian art director and actor who has appeared in Tamil language films. Veerasamar started his career as assistant to art director Sabu Cyril and made his breakthrough as an actor with a leading role in Veerasekaran (2010) and has often appeared in films in both lead and comedy roles.

== Career ==
Veerasamar began his career as an art director by apprenticing art director Sabu Cyril in director S. Shankar Boys (2003), before moving on to work in highly successful films including Kaadhal (2004), Veyil (2006) and Poo (2008).

Veerasamar made his acting debut through Veerasekaran (2010), which had a low profile release. The film later garnered attention for being the first film of actress Amala Paul, who became popular after her performance in Prabhu Solomon's Mynaa (2010).Two other films K. T. Kunjumon's Kadhalukku Maranamillai and Samy's Sarithiram were completed but failed to be released. He later moved back to playing supporting roles and prioritising his career as an art director, notably working on Kaadhal, Veyil, Dishyum, Komban (2015), Marudhu (2016), Kadaikutty Singam (2018), Jackpot (2019), Namma Veetu Pillai (2019), Thanne Vandi (2021), Akka Kuruvi (2022), DSP (2022), Yaadhum Oore Yaavarum Kelir (2023), 1943: Kappaleriya Thamizhan (2023), and Cheran's Journey (2024)

== Filmography ==
Year	Film	Art director	Actor	Notes
2004	Kaadhal	Yes	Yes	
2005	Anbe Vaa	Yes		
2006	Dishyum	Yes		
2006	Veyil	Yes	Yes	
2008	Vaazhthugal	Yes		
2008	Poo	Yes	Yes	
2008	Akku	Yes		
2008	Pandi	Yes	Yes	
2010	Veerasekaran	Yes	Yes	
2011	Muthukku Muthaaga		Yes	
2011	Velayudham		Yes	
2012	Pandi Oliperukki Nilayam	Yes	Yes	
2015	Komban	Yes	Yes	
2016	Marudhu	Yes		
2017	Oru Kidayin Karunai Manu		Yes	
2018	Kadaikutty Singam	Yes	Yes	
2018	Saavi	Yes		
2019	Pattipulam	Yes	Yes	
2019	Kudimagan		Yes	
2019	Namma Veettu Pillai	Yes	Yes	
2019	Jackpot	Yes	Yes	
2021	Thanne Vandi	Yes	Yes	
2022	Akka Kuruvi	Yes		
2022	Aattral	Yes		
2022	DSP	Yes	Yes	
2023	Yaadhum Oore Yaavarum Kelir	Yes	Yes	
2023	Tamil Kudimagan	Yes	Yes	
2023	Ala Ila Ela	Yes		Telugu film
2023	1943: Kappaleriya Thamizhan	Yes	Yes	
2024	Cheran's Journey	Yes		
2024	Kaaduvetty	Yes		
2024	Rajakili	Yes		
2025	Paramasivan Fathima	Yes	Yes	
2025	Thalaivan Thalaivii	Yes		
