= Thiru.Manickam =

2024 Tamil film by Nandha Periyasamy

- Theatrical release poster
- Directed by: Nandha Periyasamy
- Written by: Nandha Periyasamy
- Produced by: GP Ravi Kumar; Chinta Gopala Krishna Reddy; Raja Senthil
- Starring: Samuthirakani; Ananya; Bharathiraja
- Cinematography: M. Sukumar
- Edited by: Guna
- Music by: Vishal Chandrashekhar
- Production company: GPRK Cinemas
- Distributed by: Thirrupathi Brothers; Masterpiece; Srichakraas Entertainments
- Release date: 27 December 2024
- Running time: 115 minutes
- Country: India
- Language: Tamil

Thiru.Manickam (transl. Mr. Manickam) is a 2024 Indian Tamil-language drama film written and directed by Nandha Periyasamy, starring Samuthirakani in the titular role, alongside Ananya, Bharathiraja, Nassar, Thambi Ramaiah, Karunakaran and Ilavarasu in supporting roles. The film is produced by GP Ravi Kumar, Chinta Gopala Krishna Reddy and Raja Senthil under GPRK Cinemas banner. M. Sukumar was the cinematographer, Vishal Chandrasekhar scored the music and Guna handled the editing.

Thiru.Manickam released in theatres on 27 December 2024.

== Plot ==
Manickam is a righteous man who runs a lottery shop at the Kumily bus stand, supporting his family consisting of his wife, Sumathi, and two daughters. To supplement the family's income Sumathi prepares parcel meals for estate workers. Their younger daughter, Vaanathi, struggles with a speech stammering problem. Sumathi had borrowed ₹6 lakhs from SI Rajendran, and Manickam must soon vacate his rented shop due to upcoming construction. Sumathi gives her only gold chain to Manickam to secure a new premises.

An impoverished elderly man, whose pregnant daughter, Valli was abandoned by her husband over dowry issues, visits Manickam's shop. He selects lottery tickets but realizes he's lost his ₹500 note. Manickam agrees to keep the tickets aside until the elderly man returns to pay. One of the tickets selected by him wins a staggering ₹1.5 crore. Despite Sumathi's resistance citing the unpaid debt and her brother Chandru's attempted intervention, Manickam resolutely boards a bus to Idukki to hand over the ticket to the elderly man. En route, he meets Gurumoorthy, an NRI who questions the practicality of Manickam's quest, given the uncertainty of finding the elderly man. Sumathi's uncle attempts to persuade Manickam to return with the lottery tickets, citing his family's dire situation. However, Manickam remains resolute. They enlist the help of Church Father Samuel, whom Manickam respects, to convince him to return. Nevertheless, Manickam refuses to budge.

Father Samuel contacts Joseph, a cybercrime policeman, to track Manickam's location and intervene. Joseph agrees to help for a bribe of ₹2 lakhs. Meanwhile, Rajendran learns about the lottery ticket issue and seeks to exploit the situation for personal gain. He attempts to contact the bus driver Narayanan to intercept Manickam but fails. Undeterred, Rajendran sets off in his jeep to chase the bus. The KSRTC bus stops at a rest stop, where Sumathi emotionally blackmails Manickam. Meanwhile, Manickam's bag is stolen, but after a struggle, he retrieves the ticket from a sewage drain. Manickam firmly informs Sumathi that the lottery money doesn't belong to him. Manickam now boards another private bus. SI Rajendran contacts his colleague SI Kesavan in Senganur, instructing him to arrest Manickam on false charges of stealing ₹1.5 crores. Kesavan enlists Constable Esakki's help, claiming Manickam possesses 20 kg of cannabis.

Manickam's photo is sent to Constable Sargunam, who happens to be a co-passenger. However, due to a weak signal in the forest, Sargunam is unable to view the photo. When the bus gets punctured, Manickam boards another minibus. As Constable Sargunam views Manickam's photo, he realizes he has lost him. Meanwhile, Joseph, who had been tracking Manickam, misleads Chandru to a cliff, ensuring Manickam's safety. Sumathi attempts to emotionally manipulate Manickam using their younger daughter, but he instead shares a story from his childhood. The young Manickam had stolen from an elderly lottery seller, Bhai, who, instead of punishing him, forgives Manickam, thereby instilling guilt and remorse. Bhai takes care of Manickam, but tragically, Bhai passes away when Manickam was falsely arrested. The story moves Manickam's family, and his younger daughter encourages him to proceed. Manickam spots the elderly man, but the police apprehend him. Manickam escapes before SI Rajendran arrives and successfully hands over the lottery ticket, saving the elderly man's daughter from committing suicide. The elderly man insists that Manickam deserves the lottery winnings since he didn't purchase the ticket from him. However, Manickam refuses.

Manickam's selfless act goes viral on social media, earning him widespread recognition. The Chief Minister of Kerala felicitates Manickam and Sumathi is awarded a government job, and the district collector bears the education expenses of Manickam's daughter. The ruling party of Kerala covers Vaanathi's medical expenses, and a builder friend of the Chief Minister offers Manickam's family a residence. Manickam finally addresses the media, concluding that honesty and righteousness are fundamental principles, and being rewarded for these values seems to imply that being righteous is now considered exceptional. Also, the elderly man utilizes the lottery winnings to build a hospital in Poomparai village with government assistance.

== Cast ==
- Bharathiraja as an elderly man
- Samuthirakani as Manickam
- Ananya as Sumathi, Manickam's wife
- Nassar as Bhai, a lottery ticket seller
- Vadivukkarasi as the elderly man's wife
- Thambi Ramaiah as Gurumoorthy, an NRI from UK
- Ilavarasu as Sumathi's paternal uncle
- Chinni Jayanth as Samuel, a church father
- Sriman as a private bus driver
- Karunakaran as Constable A. Sargunam
- Sulile Kumar as SI Rajendran
- Master Videsh Anand as young Manickam
- Baby Shivaani Harikumar as Manickam and Sumathi's elder daughter
- Baby Jaseena as Vanathi, Manickam and Sumathi's younger daughter
- Chaams as Narayanan, KSRTC bus driver
- Pondy Ravi as Constable Esakki
- Iravin Nizhal Chandru as Chandru, Sumathi's brother
- Reshma Prasad as Valli, the elderly man's daughter
- Singampuli as Sumathi's father (photographic appearance)
- Pichaikkaran Moorthy as a co-passenger

Additionally Arya, R. Parthiban, G. Gnanasambandan, Erode Mahesh, Pa. Vijay, Aari Arujunan, Venkat Renganathan, Kavitha Jawahar, Valaipechu Andhanan and KPY Bala were featured as themselves, praising the humanitarian act of Manickam.

== Production ==
=== Development ===
On 20 September 2023, an announcement was made through a first-look poster released by Vijay Sethupathi and Venkat Prabhu regarding the project titled Thiru.Manikkam written and directed by Nandha Periyasamy, who last directed Anandham Vilayadum Veedu and wrote Rashmi Rocket (both 2021). The film stars Samuthirakani portraying the titular character making his comeback as the lead actor after Lakshmy Ramakrishnan's Are You Ok Baby? (2023). The film includes Ananya, Bharathiraja in important roles alongside an ensemble cast including Nassar, Thambi Ramaiah, Sriman, Vadivukkarasi, Karunakaran, Ilavarasu, Chinni Jayanth and Chaams supporting roles.

The film is produced by GP Ravi Kumar, Chinta Gopala Krishna Reddy and Raja Senthil under GPRK Cinemas banner. The technical crew consists of M. Sukumar as the cinematographer and Vishal Chandrasekhar scoring the music and SP Raja Sethupathi handling the editing. In the film teaser, Guna was credited as the editor.

=== Filming ===
Principal photography took place across different locations in Kerala such as Kumily, Munnar, Meghamalai and Thekkady and on 8 October 2023, it was announced that the filming has wrapped.

=== Post-production ===
On February 18, 2024, the makers announced that the entire cast has completed the process of dubbing and in mid-April 2024 it was reported that film's background music work was started in Hyderabad and was completed by Vishal by early May.

=== Marketing ===
On the occasion of New Year 2024, a new poster was released featuring the lead actor along with his family consisting of his wife and two daughters. The teaser was released on 1 August 2024 by Saregama with the voice-over given by M. Sasikumar drawing comparisons between Manickam and a deer.

== Music ==
Thiru.Manickam

Soundtrack album by Vishal Chandrashekhar
- Genre: Feature film soundtrack
- Length: 14:45
- Language: Tamil
- Label: Saregama
- Producer: Vishal Chandrashekhar

Vishal Chandrashekhar chronology
Bachchala Malli (2024)	Thiru.Manickam (2024)	Single (2025)

Singles from Thiru.Manickam
- 1. "Bommakka" Released: 22 October 2024

External audio
- Thiru.Manickam - Full Album on YouTube

The soundtrack and background are composed by Vishal Chandrasekhar, with lyrics written by Snehan, Raju Murugan, Sorko and Ilango Krishnan. The first single "Bommakka" was released on 22 October 2024. Following a pre-release event on 17 December 2024, the full album containing 5 songs was released.

Track listing
No.	Title	Lyrics	Singer(s)	Length
1.	"Bommakka"	Ilango Krishnan	Tippu	3:44
2.	"Aaraaro"	Snehan	Haricharan	3:04
3.	"Odi Odi"	Raju Murugan	Vijay Prakash	3:28
4.	"Anbe Mozhi"	Snehan	Shibi Srinivasan	2:54
5.	"Vanam Thembi"	Sorkko	Sinduri S, Karunguyil Ganesan	1:35
Total length:				14:45

== Release ==
=== Theatrical ===
Thiru.Manickam released in theatres on 27 December 2024. Earlier it was scheduled for 20 December 2024.

=== Home media ===
The post-theatrical streaming rights of the film were bought by ZEE5 and it began streaming from 24 January 2025 in Tamil, Kannada, and Malayalam. The satellite rights of the film were bought by Zee Tamil and Zee Thirai.

== Reception ==
Abhinav Subramanian of The Times of India gave 2.5/5 stars and wrote "All in all, Thiru Manickam strives to evoke a strong emotional response, but leaves you feeling as unmoved as a block of granite." Anusha Sundar of OTT Play gave 2/5 stars and wrote "A preachy, and too-good to be true story does not elevate this flatline family drama." Jayabhuvaneshwari B of Cinema Express gave 2/5 stars and wrote "While Thiru.Manickam aspires to shine like the titular gem, the film ultimately feels more like polished glass—reflective on the surface, but lacking the brilliance within." Kirubhakar Purushothaman of News18 gave 2/5 stars and wrote "Thiru. Manickam indeed, has its heart at the right place. However, it has to be reiterated that good intentions don’t always make good cinema." A critic from Dinamalar gave 2.5/5 stars.
