= Pandi Oliperukki Nilayam =

2012 Indian film by Rasu Madhuravan

- Poster
- Directed by: Rasu Madhuravan
- Written by: Rasu Madhuravan
- Produced by: Rasu Maduravan
- Starring: Sabarish; Sunaina
- Cinematography: U. K. Senthil Kumar
- Music by: Kavi Periya Thambi
- Production company: Nesika Thirai Arangam
- Release date: 17 August 2012
- Country: India
- Language: Tamil

Pandi Oliperukki Nilayam (transl. Pandi Loudspeaker Station) is a 2012 Indian Tamil-language romantic comedy film written and directed by Rasu Madhuravan. The film stars Sabarish and Sunaina.

== Cast ==
- Sabarish Vijayan as Pandi
- Sunaina as Valarmathi
- Soori as Soori
- Thambi Ramaiah as food-stall owner
- Singampuli as Pandi's brother and micset company's shareholder
- Karunas as Amarkalam, Pandi's rival
- Vatsan Chakravarthy as Siluva
- Raj Kapoor as Pandi's father
- K. Selva Bharathy
- Vaiyapuri as Neighbour
- King Kong as Amarkalam's assistant
- Ambani Shankar as shop owner
- Veerasamar as henchman
- Prabu as Paraman
- Devaraj
- Pandian
- Nagendran
- Madurai Market Muthu
- Pasumpon Suresh
- Periyasamy as childhood Pandi
- Bava Lakshmanan as loan giver
- Appu as Amarkalam Assistant's brother

== Production ==
The film was originally titled Mike Set Pandi, but later retitled Pandi Oli Perukki Nilayam. Shabarish, son of popular stunt choreographer FEFSI Vijayan, selected for the male lead. Singam Puli and Vatsan will be seen in important roles. Deva, Pandian, Veerasamar, Nagendran, Madurai Market Muthu and Pasumpon Suresh are selected for Sunaina's brothers role. Salman Khan's body double Prabhu plays the antagonist.

== Soundtrack ==
Songs are by Kavi Periyathambi, who previously worked with Rasu Madhuravan for Muthukku Muthaaga. The audio rights were acquired by Gemini Film Circuit & T-Series Regional.

Song title	Lyricist	Singers
"Azhagu Saroja"	Nanalala	Mukesh Mohamed
"Dandanakara"	Nanalala	Baghyaraj, Priya
"Mudhal Mudalai"	Kavi Periyathambi	Prasanna, Lavanya
"Azhagana Nilavu"	Kavi Periyathambi	Harish Raghavendra
"Kettukodi Urumimelam" (remix)	Kannadasan	M. L. R. Karthikeyan, Anitha

== Reception ==
A critic from The Times of India gave the film a rating of three out of five stars and wrote that "Although the movie is more than two-and-a-half-hours long, thanks to the comedy track it feels to be time well spent". Malathi Rangarajan of The Hindu opined that "Somewhere through the making of PON, Rasu Madhuravan seems to have lost interest, and it shows". Malini Mannath of The New Indian Express wrote, "Probably, the only watchable moment in the film is the impressively choreographed climax fight set in an Emu farm", and the film, "with nothing novel or exciting to offer, is forgettable fare". A critic from Maalai Malar gave the film a negative review.
