= Veerasekaran =

- Theatrical release poster
- Directed by: Sathish Kumar
- Produced by: Chandrasekaran G
- Starring: Veerasamar; Amala Paul
- Music by: Sajan Madhav
- Production company: F C S Creations
- Release date: 5 March 2010
- Country: India
- Language: Tamil

Veerasekaran is a 2010 Indian Tamil-language drama film directed by Sathish Kumar. The film features Veerasamar and Amala Paul in the lead roles. Prathap K. Pothan plays a negative role in the film. This was the debut film for Veerasamar and Amala Paul's Tamil cinema debut.

== Plot ==
The film is about an unemployed youngster, Veerasekaran, who travels to Chennai from his village.

== Cast ==
- Veerasamar as Veerasekaran
- Amala Paul as Sugandhi
- Prathap K. Pothan
- M. S. Bhaskar
- Aarthi

== Soundtrack ==
Track listing
No.	Title	Singer(s)	Length
1.	"Kuru Kuru Paarvai"	Sargen Madhavan
2.	"Kottiveche Theeya"	Naveen, Sujithra
3.	"Yai Thozha"	Tippu
4.	"En Kannai Katti"	Balram
5.	"Vizhiye Nijam Thana"	Naresh Iyer

== Release and reception ==
The film was released on 5 March 2010 along with Aval Peyar Thamizharasi and Thambikku Indha Ooru. Dinamalar criticised the story.
