= Thodakkam =

- Directed by: Muthukumar
- Written by: Muthukumar
- Produced by: K. S. Vijayendra
- Starring: Raghu Vannan; Monica; Raghuvaran; Meghna Nair; Ramesh Khanna
- Cinematography: V. Adithya
- Edited by: Uma Shankar Babu
- Music by: Jeyrom Pushparaj
- Release date: 1 February 2008
- Country: India
- Language: Tamil

Thodakkam (transl. Beginning) is a 2008 Indian Tamil-language thriller film written and directed by Muthukumar, starring Raghu Vannan and Monica. Prior to release the film was known as Arambam.

== Plot ==
Vanchinathan, Gayathri, Chindo, Habeeb and Nancy have studied together from childhood. Now graduates, they plan to find opportunities abroad to earn money. The day arrives but their plans are thwarted as they find themselves in the thick of a conspiracy.

== Cast ==
- Raghu Vannan as Vanchinathan
- Monica as Gayathri
- Abhinay as Chindo
- Rishi as Habeeb
- Meha Nair as Nancy
- Raghuvaran
- Subair Mohamed Rikas
- Ramesh Khanna as Rapichai
- R. Sundarrajan
- Rajeev
- V. S. Raghavan
- Sulakshana

== Soundtrack ==
Soundtrack was composed by Jerome Pushparaj.

- "Yaar Yaaro" — Gautham, Maya
- "Adamin Apple" — Ranjani-Gayatri, Sathyan
- "Phone Pottu" — Gana Bala
- "Ethuthan Mudiyathu" — Raghuvaran
- "Vaa Nanba" — Vijay Yesudas

== Reception ==
S. R. Ashokkumar of The Hindu wrote "Muthukumar R, who is in charge of story and direction has also written the dialogue, which passes muster. If only he had made the screenplay tight, the film would have been engrossing".
