= Maaran (2002 film) =

- Poster
- Directed by: A. Jawahar
- Written by: A. Jawahar; Pattukkottai Prabakar (dialogues)
- Produced by: J. S. Pankaj Mehta
- Starring: Sathyaraj; Seetha; Raghuvannan
- Cinematography: U. K. Senthil Kumar
- Edited by: Sai Elango
- Music by: Deva
- Production company: Power Media
- Release date: 20 September 2002
- Running time: 142 minutes
- Country: India
- Language: Tamil

Maaran is a 2002 Indian Tamil-language vigilante film, directed by A. Jawahar, starring Sathyaraj, Seetha and Raghuvannan. It was released on 20 September 2002. The film was a moderate success at the box office.

== Plot ==
Maaran is a clerk in the district collector's office. His life centres around his loving wife, his son, and his daughter. Soft-spoken, and a Gandhian to the hilt, Maaran does not stand by any smear on the Mahatma's name. Being a staunch patriot, he had even named his son Sudhandhiram.

After topping at the state level, Sudhandhiram gets an admission in a medical college, where he is in for a rough time, ragged mercilessly by the sadistic Shivadas and his cronies. Nonetheless, Anjali falls in love with Sudhandhiram. Matters run wild when Sudhandhiram returns Shivadas's humiliations with a tight slap and defeats him in the college elections. Shivadas's humiliation makes matters even wild when Sudhandhiram pays for it with his life. Shivadas packs the corpse in a suitcase and disposes of it. But soon, Shivadas is hauled up for the murder. However, Shivadas manages to get a clean chit of the case thanks to his influential father. Seetha becomes a lunatic due to the emotional shock. The grieving Maaran takes it upon himself to justify his son's murder.

Maaran traces out the conspirators one by one, and have their evil terminate themselves, justifying his own way of justice. In the end, Maaran kills the doctor and gets surrounded in the court. He is hanged in jail.

== Cast ==
- Sathyaraj as Maaran
- Seetha as Seetha, Maaran's wife
- Raghuvannan as Sudhandhiram, Maaran's son
- Preethi Varma as Amudha, Maaran's daughter
- Robert as Shivadas
- Santhoshi as Anjali
- Delhi Ganesh as Ganesan
- Vinu Chakravarthy as Rangaswamy
- Cochin Haneefa as a C.B.I officer Madanagopal
- Ravikumar as Shivadas's father
- Sarath Babu as a District collector
- Ilavarasu as Inspector Irulandi
- Thalaivasal Vijay as Dr. Prakash
- Devan as Central Minister
- Raj Kapoor as Lawyer Subramaniam
- Mahanadi Shankar
- Mayilsamy
- Crane Manohar
- Bonda Mani
- Periya Karuppu Thevar
- Gowthami Vembunathan
- Pallavi as a doctor (guest appearance)
- Abhinayashree, special appearance in Item number

== Production ==
The film was first announced with the title of Sivaji, before being changed to Maaran. It is the directorial debut of A. Jawahar, who previously apprenticed under directors Senthilnathan and Sundar C. Raghuvannan made his acting debut with this film.

== Soundtrack ==
The music was composed by Deva, with lyrics written by Pa. Vijay. The song "Kannukulle" is heavily based on Hindi song "Bahut Pyaar Karte Hain" from Saajan.

Song	Singer(s)	Duration
"Aanantham Aanantham"	Unni Menon, Sujatha Mohan	5:07
"Felomina Ni Enthan"	S. P. B. Charan, Mathangi	4:08
"Kannukulle"	Unni Menon	5:33
"Pudi Pudi Kabadi"	Anuradha Sriram	5:14
"Queen Marys"	Silambarasan	4:59

== Reception ==
AllIndianSite.com cited the film as "a good movie and worth watching". Malathi Rangarajan of The Hindu said, "Maaran takes off so well and so differently but the maker obviously got jittery mid-way and allows regular formula fare to take over, with revenge as the pivot." Malini Mannath of Chennai Online wrote, "The script is sensitively handled, the performances well co-ordinated, the director revealing a firm grip on the medium in his very first effort". Visual Dasan of Kalki praised the director for handling the plot and also praised the performances of artistes.
