= Sattapadi Kutram =

2011 Indian film directed by S. A. Chandrasekaran

- Poster
- Directed by: S. A. Chandrasekaran
- Written by: S. A. Chandrasekaran
- Dialogues by: V. Prabhakar
- Produced by: S. A. Chandrasekaran
- Starring: Sathyaraj; Vikranth; Harish Kalyan; Bhanu; Komal Sharma; Aishwarya Rajesh
- Cinematography: Anji
- Edited by: Kola Bhaskar
- Music by: Vijay Antony
- Release date: 25 March 2011
- Country: India
- Language: Tamil

Sattapadi Kutram (transl. Wrong By Law) is a 2011 Indian Tamil action film written, produced, and directed by S. A. Chandrasekaran. The film stars Sathyaraj, Vikranth, Harish Kalyan, Bhanu, Komal Sharma, and Aishwarya Rajesh. Seeman, A. Venkatesh, Suresh, and Radha Ravi play supporting roles. The music was composed by Vijay Antony with cinematography by Anji and editing by Kola Bhaskar. The film released on 25 March 2011 to negative reviews and performed poorly at the box-office.

The film dealt with various issues, including corruption in the higher echelons of the government, stashing of black money abroad by Indians, corruption in the Directorate of Vigilance and Anti-Corruption, sexual exploits of godmen, travails of Indian fishermen and the Sri Lankan ethnic conflict.

== Plot ==
The film revolves around a man named Subash Chandrabose (Sathyaraj), whose life has been torn to shreds by corrupt men of the system. He faced the brunt of their anger when he dared to stand up against them. Now, his sole aim is to purge the system and the country of all corrupt evils. For that, he begins forging a small army of young people who are at a similar angst against the system or at least some people in it. How this army goes about in its task of cleansing the political and bureaucratic scenario forms the rest of Sattapadi Kuttram.

== Cast ==
- Sathyaraj as Subash Chandrabose, a vigilante who wants justice
- Vikranth as Thangaraj, a fellow vigilante and follower of Chandrabose
- Harish Kalyan as Surya, a man whom Chandrabose helps and recruits
- Bhanu as Poorani, a fellow vigilante and follower of Chandrabose
- Komal Sharma as Thamizharasi, Chandrabose's wife who is killed
- Aishwarya Rajesh as Sumathi, Surya's ex-girlfriend
- Seeman as Lawyer
- A. Venkatesh as Ekambaram
- Radha Ravi as Judge Rathnavelu
- Suresh as Annamalai
- Livingston as Santhana Swamy
- T. P. Gajendran as Jambulingam
- Ajay Rathnam as Police Officer
- Alex as Politician
- C. Ranganathan
- Crane Manohar
- Amarasigamani
- Boys Rajan
- Chaplin Balu

== Soundtrack ==
The soundtrack was composed by Vijay Antony. Vijay later re-used the film's song Yededho in his 2016 psychological thriller Saithan.

Sattapadi Kutram

Soundtrack album by Vijay Antony
- Released: 12 January 2011
- Genre: Feature film soundtrack
- Length: 9:43
- Language: Tamil
- Producer: Vijay Antony

Vijay Antony chronology
Uthamaputhiran (2010)	Sattapadi Kutram (2011)	Yuvan Yuvathi (2011)

No.	Title	Singer(s)	Length
1.	"Rathiri Nerathu (Remix)"	Krishan Mahesan, Priyadarshani	3:38
2.	"Andam"	Senthil, Anitha	2:43
3.	"Yedhedho"	Vijay Antony	3:22
Total length:			9:43

== Critical reception ==
The New Indian Express wrote that "Appalling and ridiculous, these scenes only generate a lot of unintended humour." Rohit Ramachandran of nowrunning.com gave it 2/5 stars stating that "Realism is Sattapadi Kuttram's least concern. Its main concern is entertainment factor. It doesn't qualify as a good film but it manages to hold your interest." Behindwoods.com gave 1 on 5 and stated that the film was "Scathing political statement" and "The choice is whether you want to watch a reel account of all those scams and scandals being performed by actors when the real deal is being shown 24X7 on news channels. Make up your mind!".
