= Nagaraja Cholan MA, MLA =

2013 Indian film by Manivannan

- Theatrical release poster
- Directed by: Manivannan
- Written by: Manivannan
- Produced by: S. Ravichandran; K. Suresh
- Starring: Sathyaraj; Manivannan; Seeman
- Cinematography: D. Sankar
- Edited by: R. Sudharsan
- Music by: James Vasanthan
- Production company: V House Production
- Release date: 10 May 2013
- Running time: 136 minutes
- Country: India
- Language: Tamil

Nagaraja Cholan MA, MLA (credited as Nagaraja Cholan MA, MLA: Amaidhipadai – 2) is a 2013 Indian Tamil-language political satire film written and directed by Manivannan. A sequel to Amaidhipadai (1994), it stars Sathyaraj in his 200th film, reprising his role as Nagaraja Cholan from the original, alongside an ensemble cast including Seeman, Manivannan, his son Raghuvannan, Mrudula Murali, Komal Sharma and Varsha Ashwathi. The film, featuring music composed by James Vasanthan, was produced by Ravichandran and K. Suresh under the banner of V House Production.

Unlike the original, Nagaraja Cholan MA, MLA was unsuccessful. It was Manivannan's 50th and last film as a director and actor, as he died a month after the film's release.

== Cast ==
- Sathyaraj as Nagaraja Cholan & Rajagopal
- Manivannan as Ex-MLA Manimaran, the sidekick and ex-officio owner of Nagaraja's illegal properties
- Seeman as a farmer and farmer rights activist
- Raghuvannan as Gangaikondaan, Nagaraja's son who was later the acting chief minister
- Mrudula Murali as Shenbagavalli, Gangaikondaan's wife
- Komal Sharma as school teacher Kamalini, Seeman's fiancée
- Ansiba Hassan
- Varsha Ashwathi as Amudha, Nagaraja Chozhan's mistress who was initially Manimaran's mistress
- M. S. Bhaskar as Kumbakonam Kootha Perumal MLA, the leader of the party in ruling coalition who merges his party with the ruling party for Nagaraja Chozhan to become CM
- Sujatha Sivakumar as Kamalini's widow mother and Seeman's sister
- Oorvambu Lakshmi as Journalist
- Vaiyapuri
- K. P. Jagannath
- Krishnamoorthy
- Rajkanth
- Ramya
- Madhu

== Soundtrack ==
The soundtrack was composed by James Vasanthan.

- "Kannadi Papa" — Pooja
- "Malamele" — Palaniammal, Mahalingam
- "Mamanukku Ennadi" — Nancy, Vasudha, Sarayu
- "Suda Sudathan" — MK Balaji
- "Viraivil Vidiyum" — James Vasanthan

== Critical reception ==
Sidharth Varma of The Times of India gave the film 2 1/2 out of 5 stars and wrote, "If you are familiar with Nagaraja Cholan as a ruthless politician, who rose from being Ammavasai in Amaidhipadai, this movie will definitely disappoint you...his resurrection after almost 20 years ends up a failed attempt to build on the character...The movie is a pale shadow of the original, except for the few scenes involving Cholan and his trusted aide Manimaran". Baradwaj Rangan wrote for The Hindu, "If Manivannan wants to take a hit character from a hit film and spin a new story around him, that's his prerogative — except that the story, this time, doesn't stick". Vivek Ramz of In.com said the film "is no patch on its original. Give it a miss!".
