= Poomagal Oorvalam =

- Poster
- Directed by: Rasu Madhuravan
- Written by: Rasu Madhuravan
- Produced by: R. B. Choudary
- Starring: Prashanth; Rambha; Livingston
- Cinematography: M. Prasad
- Edited by: V. Jaishankar
- Music by: Siva
- Production company: Super Good Films
- Release date: 30 April 1999
- Running time: 158 minutes
- Country: India
- Language: Tamil

Poomagal Oorvalam (transl. Procession of a flower girl) is a 1999 Indian Tamil-language romantic comedy drama film written and directed by Rasu Madhuravan in his debut. The film stars Prashanth, Livingston and Rambha in the lead roles. The film's score and soundtrack are composed by Siva.

Poomagal Oorvalam was released on 30 April 1999 and became a commercial success.

== Plot ==
Saravanan, orphaned by his dead mother – a mental patient, is adopted by a childless couple. Theirs is an inter-caste marriage. At college, he runs into Kavitha, the granddaughter of caste-obsessed Sengodan. The triangle is completed by Aavudayappan alias Armstrong, a US-return who is smitten by Kavitha.

With a little unintentional photo-swapping by the marriage broker, the parents of Saravanan and Aavudayappan (the fathers have the same name) both think they have an alliance for their son with Sengodan's family and show up at Kavitha's house at the same time. Romance flowers between Saravanan and Kavitha, who assume they are going to wed, while Aavudayappan continues to dream of Kavitha.

A series of contrivances allow this comedy of errors to carry on till the engagement where the announcement of the groom's name causes all sorts of confusions. Sengodan is now against the Saravanan-Kavitha union since Saravanan's parents are of different castes. Things come to a dramatic conclusion when Sengodan realises that Saravanan is indeed his own grandson, with a brief flashback relating to Boopathy – Vasanthi marriage split due to her illness. The film ends with Saravanan and Kavitha marrying each other.

== Cast ==
- Prashanth as Saravanan
- Rambha as Kavitha
- Livingston as Aavudayappan (Armstrong)
- Manivannan as Chidambaram, Saravanan's adoptive father
- Radha Ravi as Chidambaram
- Rajan P. Dev as Sengodan
- Nizhalgal Ravi as Boopathy
- Radhika as Lakshmi, Saravanan's adoptive mother
- Vivek as Sakthi
- Vaiyapuri as Muniyandi
- Ponvannan as Gangadharan, Kavitha's father
- Pandu as Broker Ponnusamy
- Sathyapriya as Meenakshi
- Anju as Vasanthi, Saravanan's mother
- Scissor Manohar as Sakthi's friend
- Kumaresan as Sakthi's friend
- Halwa Vasu as Murugesan
- Master Mahendran as Young Saravanan
- Baby Hemalatha as Ragini
- Bava Lakshmanan as Gopalakrishna
- Dinesh (special appearance in "Vaada Nannbane")
- Japan Kumar (special appearance in "Vaada Nannbane")

== Production ==
It was reported that the actor Prashanth was badly hurt on his face, while he took part in a stunt scene; a sharp iron rod hit him on his face and he was hurt on his left cheek and immediately had three stitches on this wound from a local hospital. Further reports claimed that he was set to travel to London to partake in cosmetic surgery to avoid scarring. The issue was later reported to be exaggerated, with Prashanth clarifying he had a minor injury and the media blew the incident out of proportion.

== Soundtrack ==
The soundtrack was composed by Siva.

Song	Singer(s)	Duration
"Malare Oru Varthai"	Hariharan, Sujatha	05:02
"Vaada Nannbane"	Unni Krishnan	04:58
"Naan Thai Yenndru"	K. S. Chithra	05:33
"Antha Vaanukku"	Unni Krishnan	04:59
"Chinna Vennilave"	Hariharan, Harini	05:00
"Kannai Parikkira"	Unni Krishnan, K. S. Chithra, Arunmozhi	05:05

== Critical reception ==
K. N. Vijiyan of New Straits Times gave the film a mixed review, calling the songs as hindrances to the plot, but praised the performances of Prashanth and Rambha. D. S. Ramanujam from The Hindu wrote: "Fun-laden situations and humor course along at a brisk pace in Supergood Films’ Poomagal Oorvalam. Debutant director Mathuravan, who has written the story, dialogue and screenplay, structures his narration in an enjoyable way. For Prasanth, the hero, it is another proof of his caliber, be it pouring out emotions, without overdoing it, carrying with subtlety the lighter moments or dancing comfortably".
