= Eetti =

2015 Indian film by Ravi Arasu

- Directed by: Ravi Arasu
- Written by: Ravi Arasu
- Produced by: S. Michael Rayappan
- Starring: Atharvaa; Sri Divya
- Cinematography: Saravanan Abhimanyu
- Edited by: Raja Mohammad
- Music by: G. V. Prakash Kumar
- Production company: Global Infotainment Pvt. Ltd
- Distributed by: Global Infotainment Pvt Ltd
- Release date: 11 December 2015
- Country: India
- Language: Tamil

Eetti (transl. Spear) is a 2015 Tamil-language sports action film written and directed by Ravi Arasu in his directorial debut. Produced by S. Michael Rayappan, the film stars Atharvaa and Sri Divya, while G. V. Prakash Kumar composed the music. It was released on 11 December 2015.

== Plot ==
Pughazhenthi Subramaniam is an athlete who lives in Thanjavur. He is a hurdles race champion and has won many awards – even beating the national record in a local sports meet. He and his fellow athlete friends get intensive training from their coach Devaraj to participate in an important sports meet in Kolkata, and the winners will qualify for the next major national sports event.

A flashback reveals that Pughazh has Glanzmann's thrombasthenia, which prevents his blood from clotting following any injury. If he gets even a small scratch, he might bleed to death. His father Subramaniam is a constable at the local police station who is very protective of him, has high hopes that he will advance well in life, and make a name for himself as an athlete.

Gayathri Venugopal, a college student who lives in Chennai, finds out that her friend is being harassed on the phone every night by a guy. Gayathri decides to take action by calling him up and threatening him in foul language. However, due to a mix-up, she ends up calling Pughazh in Thanjavur instead. The next day, she realizes her mistake and apologizes to Pughazh on the phone. As a joke, he asks her to top up his mobile phone account, and she quickly does so to make up for it. He then pesters her successfully for several days day for further credit for his mobile phone account until he introduces himself and tells her that he will not call and annoy her anymore. Even though they both have not seen each other's faces before, Gayathri realizes that she likes him and initiates their next communication.

The Calcutta sports meet gets unexpectedly relocated to Chennai instead. Hence, Devaraj decides to go to Chennai with Pughazh and the rest of the team a few days early and train there, which was perfect for Pughazh to make plans to meet up with Gayathri. Gayathri's brother Dinesh Venugopal gets involved in a counterfeit money scam and calls the cops on the criminal gang who manufactures the currency notes without revealing his identity. The right-hand man in the criminal gang falls for Gayathri when he sees her. The leader of the gang goes to Gayathri's house to speak to her parents to get her married off to his favorite henchman, but Dinesh intervenes and threatens to go to the police, in the process revealing that he is the one who called the cops on the gang.

The gang decides to murder Dinesh. When the henchmen are chasing Dinesh, he gets a lift from Pughazh, who is on his way to meet Gayathri on his bike, lying to him that his sister is in the hospital. Due to stress, Dinesh forgets to thank Pughazh when he gets dropped off, but the gang members get a good look at Pughazh, thinking that he intentionally helped Dinesh escape. They find Pughazh, who is still on his way to meet Gayathri, and try to beat him up. However, he fights back and beats them up without getting a scratch on him. During the fight, he hurls one of the gang members, who accidentally falls on Gayathri, who is also in her way to see Pughazh. She gets knocked off her scooty, and her side mirror breaks. She calls Pughazh's mobile just as he is finishing off the fight. They both see each other for the first time. Pughazh immediately fall in love with her, but Gayathri believes that he is a rowdy.

Pughazh is still able to get in the good books of Gayathri and Dinesh by seeing them again during Gayathri's birthday. She invites him to his house, where on Gayathri gets more romantically involved with Pughazh. Meanwhile, after further altercations, the gangsters track and kill Dinesh. In retaliation to Pughazh's beating of the gangsters, they beat Devaraj, who tries to get help from the police. The DCP gives a gun to Pughazh hidden from everyone so that he can once for all finish the gangs activities using Pughazh's motivated intentions to save Devaraj. He is tracked again by the gangsters, who try to harm his friends and Devaraj, but Pughazh fights them off and finally kills them with the gun that he has hidden in his shoes. The next day, he enters the competition, but a fake athlete planted by the gangsters earlier inflicts a cut on his arm. He still runs through the hurdles and ends up unconscious as he crosses the finish line. The final tally shows him winning the hurdles race in a photo finish ending by .01 seconds. The final scenes show Gayathri as his wife watching Pughazh winning the gold medal in the Asian games, following which he also gets the post of DSP in Thanjavur.

== Cast ==
- Atharvaa as Pughazhenthi Subramaniam, an award-winning athlete and the DSP of Thanjavur in the end
- Sri Divya as Gayathri Venugopal, Pughazh's wife and a college student (Voice dubbed by Raveena Ravi)
- Aadukalam Naren as Devaraj, Pughazh's coach
- Selva as DCP Rudrakumar
- Jayaprakash as Subramaniam, Pughazh's father and a police constable
- Sonia as Pughazh's mother
- Nithyashree Venkataramanan as Pughazh's sister
- Thirumurugan as Dinesh Venugopal, Gayathri's brother
- Rindhuravi as Gayathri's mother
- Aadukalam Murugadoss as Pughazh's friend
- Ashvin Raja as Ramesh, Pughazh's friend
- Sri Balaji as Charles, Pughazh's friend
- Azhagam Perumal as Venugopal, Gayathri and Dinesh's father
- R. N. R. Manohar as Sampath
- Achyuth Kumar as Nasoor Meeran
- Crane Manohar as Tea Master
- Ramachandran Durairaj as Isaac
- Shalu Shamu as Gayathri's friend
- Subash as Mathialagan
- Riyaz as Karthik
- Rail Ravi
- Kavin J. Babu
- Eashwar
- Shantha Kumar (cameo appearance)
- Kaali Venkat as Senthil (guest appearance)

== Production ==
The film began its first schedule from 29 November 2013, with posters released depicting Atharvaa as an athlete.

== Soundtrack ==
Eetti

Soundtrack album by G. V. Prakash Kumar
- Released: 25 September 2015
- Recorded: 2015
- Genre: Soundtrack
- Length: 24:13
- Label: Sony Music India
- Producer: G. V. Prakash Kumar

G. V. Prakash Kumar chronology
Trisha Illana Nayanthara (2015)	Eetti (2015)	Visaranai (2016)

The music was composed by G. V. Prakash Kumar and released by Sony Music India.

Track list
No.	Title	Lyrics	Singer(s)	Length
1.	"Panjumittai"	Yegathasi	Hariharasudhan	4:43
2.	"Un Swaasam"	Na. Muthukumar	G.V. Prakash Kumar, MC Vickey, Maya	4:41
3.	"Naan Pudicha Mosakuttiyae"	Yegathasi	G.V. Prakash Kumar, Shakthisree Gopalan	4:15
4.	"Oru Thuli"	Annamalai	Siddharth Mahadevan	4:16
5.	"Kuiyyo Muiyyo"	Na. Muthukumar	Ranjith, Vandana Srinivasan, Maalavika Sundar	4:22
6.	"A Leap of Faith : Eetti Theme" (Instrumental)			1:56
Total length:				24:13

== Critical reception ==
The film received mixed reviews from critics. Writing for The Hindu, Baradwaj Rangan said: "An athlete faces hurdles off the track too when he gets involved with counterfeiters." Behindwoods rated the film 2.75 out of 5 and wrote, "Atharvaa is sharp in this decent entertainer". Indiaglitz wrote"'Eetti' is the best bet for commercial movie lovers." Rediff wrote "Overall, director Ravi Arasu’s Eetti is a lighthearted commercial entertainer that is worth a watch". The Times of India wrote "Eetti revolves around a sportsperson but it is not a sports film. It is a masala action movie that has smarts but is undone to an extent by the compromises that the director makes to his story". Sify wrote "Overall, Eetti with its confused presentation is not an entirely unwatchable film".
