= Goodness Gracious (disambiguation) =

"Goodness Gracious" is a 2014 song by Ellie Goulding.

Goodness Gracious may also refer to:

- Goodness, Gracious, 2006 album by Blood Feathers
- "Goodness Gracious", a 2001 song by The Lucksmiths, B-side of "Friendless Summer", re-released on Where Were We?
- "Goodness Gracious", a song by Jim Bianco from Handsome Devil
- "Goodness Gracious", a song by Kevin Gilbert from the album Thud
- "Goodness Gracious", a song by bbno$ with Yung Gravy

== See also ==
- Goodness Gracious Me (disambiguation)
