= Komal Sharma =

Indian actress, model and former squash player

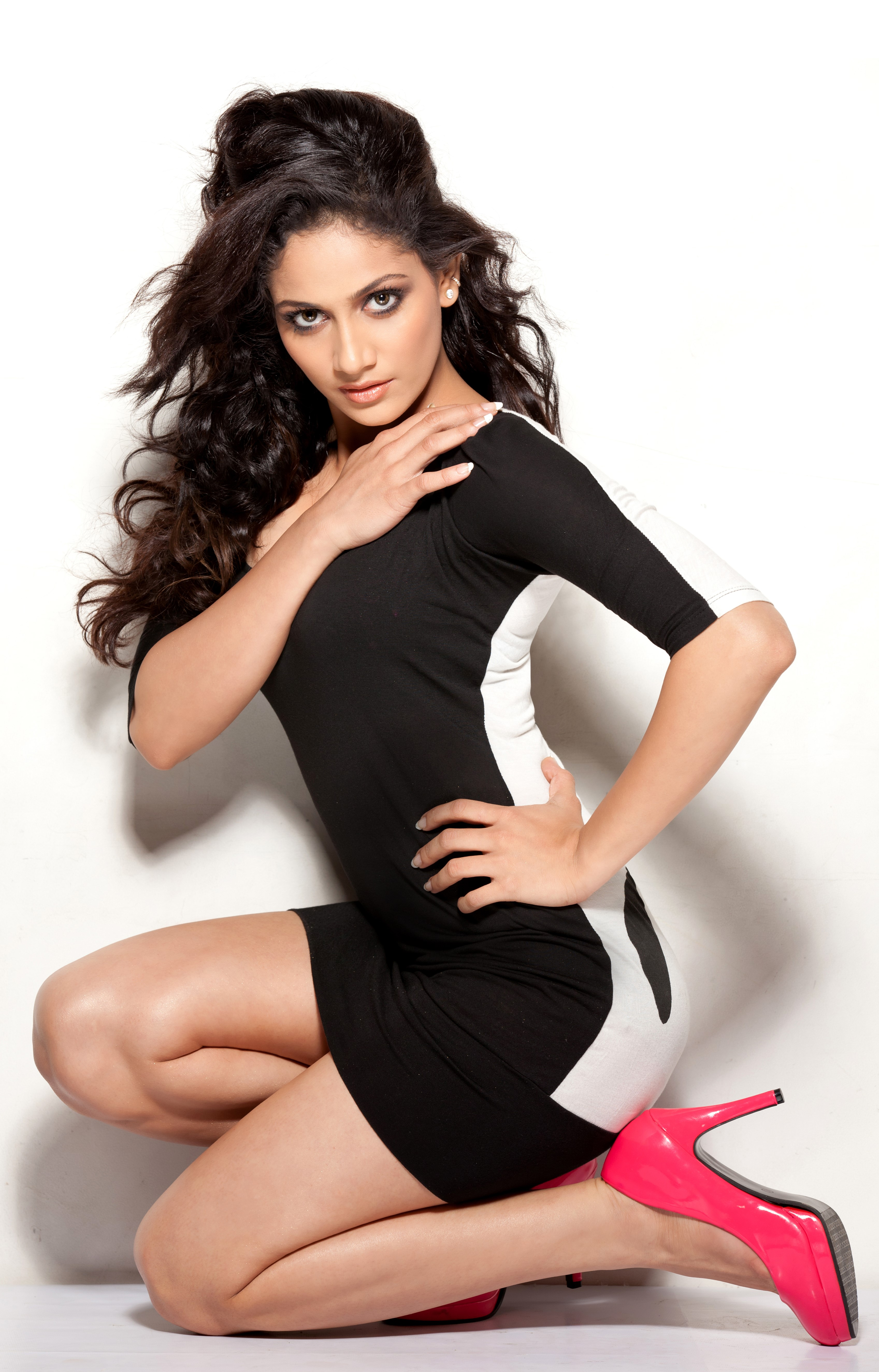
- 2011 by The Smile Group
- Born: Komal J. Sharma; Chennai, Tamil Nadu, India
- Occupations: Actress, model, squash player, social activist

Komal J. Sharma (Born 6 Nov 1991, Chennai) is an Indian actress, model and former squash player, who works in Malayalam, Tamil, Telugu, and Hindi films. She has acted in films such as Hungama 2 (2021), Marakkar: Lion of the Arabian Sea (2021), and The Greatest of All Time (2024).

== Early life ==
Komal Sharma was born in Chennai, Tamil Nadu, India, into a Rajasthani family. She is the youngest of four siblings. She graduated with a Bachelor of Computer Applications (BCA) from Sri Kanyaka Parameswari Arts and Science College for Women, Chennai.

== Career ==
=== Squash ===
Komal got interested in squash during her school days. She joined the Squash Rackets Federation of India (SRFI) and won several junior and senior National squash championships. She represented Tamil Nadu on several occasions at national level tournaments.

=== Modelling ===
She has been crowned as Miss Tamil Nadu twice in two different events and worked as a commercial model before working in films.

=== Acting career ===
In 2013, she was offered a role in S. A. Chandrasekhar's Sattapadi Kutram. Before its release, she completed Oothari, directed by Shakti Krishna. After the release of her debut film Sattapadi Kutram, she took films seriously and began carefully choosing her roles. Komal acted in Nagaraja Cholan MA, MLA, the sequel to Amaidhi Padai directed by Manivannan.

Sharma played the title role in the Telugu film Anu, directed and produced by Sunil Kumar. It was Komal's Telugu debut. Later she appeared in the Tamil film Vaigai Express directed by director Shaji Kailash. Natrinai is a Tamil movie directed and produced by director Gautham Elangovan.

She debuted in Malayalam films with Marakkar: Lion of the Arabian Sea, directed by Priyadarshan. In Marakkar, she is paired opposite Arjun Sarja. Her second Malayalam film Ittymaani: Made in China released before Marakkar and was also commercially successful.

== Filmography ==
Year	Film	Role	Language	Notes
2011	Sattapadi Kutram	Thamizharasi	Tamil	
2013	Nagaraja Cholan MA, MLA	Tamileni	Tamil	
2014	Anu	Anu	Telugu	
2017	Vaigai Express	Yamini Chandrasekharan	Tamil	
2019	Ittymaani: Made in China	Sofi	Malayalam	
2021	Marakkar: Arabikadalinte Simham	Puthumana Thampuratti	Malayalam	
2021	Hungama 2	Simran	Hindi	
2024	The Greatest of All Time	Nazeer's wife	Tamil	
2024	Barroz 3D	Emcee	Malayalam	
2025	Mask	Kayal	Tamil	
