= Maathi Yosi =

2010 film by Nandha Periyasamy

- Film poster
- Directed by: Nandha Periyasamy
- Written by: Nandha Periyasamy
- Produced by: P. S. Sekar Reddy
- Starring: Harish; Shammu; Gopal; Alex; Lokesh
- Cinematography: Vijay Armstrong
- Edited by: Kola Bhaskar
- Music by: Guru Kalyan
- Production company: PSSR Films
- Release date: 12 March 2010
- Country: India
- Language: Tamil

Maathi Yosi (transl. Think Differently) is a 2010 Indian Tamil-language coming-of-age crime drama film written and directed by Nandha Periyasamy and produced by P. S. Sekar Reddy. The film stars Harish, Shammu, Gopal, Alex and Lokesh, while Ponvannan, Ravi Mariya, and G. M. Kumar play supporting roles. The music was composed by Guru Kalyan with cinematography by Vijay Armstrong and editing by Kola Bhaskar. The film was released on 12 March 2010, and did not perform well at the box office.

== Plot ==
Pandi, Maanga, Kona, and Maari are four friends who live in Kadavur, a village in Madurai. They are united and very close, and they live for each other. They always think outside the box. They turn out to be vagabonds and go to the extent of even killing the village president's son. After a few similar delinquent experiences, they are forced to leave the village and end up coming to Chennai. How the friends meet the heroine, and what happens in Chennai with the friends and the girl forms the rest of the story.

== Cast ==
- Harish as Pandi
- Shammu as Baby
- Gopal as Maanga
- Alex as Onaan
- Lokesh as Mari
- Ponvannan
- Ravi Mariya as Baby's uncle
- G. M. Kumar
- Nellai Siva

== Production ==
After the lukewarm response to his directorial debut Oru Kalluriyin Kathai, Nandha Periyasamy wrote another script intending to cast established actors, but the project did not materialise. He then decided to write one where he did not have to rely on such actors, which became Maathi Yosi. Gopal, who appeared in a supporting role in Oru Kalluriyin Kathai, played a major role here.

== Soundtrack ==
The soundtrack was composed by Guru Kalyan, in his film debut. The audio launch was held on 10 February 2010.

All lyrics are written by Snehan.

Track listing
No.	Title	Singer(s)	Length
1.	"Methuvai Methuvai"	Karthik, Jaya, Rajgopal	4:39
2.	"Kummi Paattu Ponnu"	Karthikeyan, Gurukalyan	1:53
3.	"Maathithan Yosi"	Prashanthini, Sathyan	3:36
4.	"Acham Thavir"	Kalyan	3:38
Total length:			13:46

== Critical reception ==
Sify wrote "The film does not have a coherent script, logic and lacks focus. It is another 'Made in Madurai' bloodbath that's etched from various earlier movies and a bit from Fernando Meirelles's classic City of God". Bhama Devi Ravi of The Times of India wrote "Periyasamy, who had showed some promise in his earlier outing Oru Kalluriyin Kathai, is clearly in the grip of the good-at-heart village boys ending up in a mess-street plot. Nothing original, nothing closely resembling out-of- the-box thinking, but a faithful adherence to the way Madurai-belt films pan out."

IANS appreciated the editing and cinematography but criticised the screenplay, concluding, "Starting promisingly by focusing on the casteist problem, the films goes wayward and loses its opportunity to be an [sic] unique movie". Pavithra Srinivasan of Rediff.com wrote, "While the production values are good, the rural slang, costumes and even the mind-set of four young men from a random village are accurately portrayed (a tad repetitive), you only wish the director had taken the pains to emulate his celluloid mentors and etched a rational tale". Malathi Rangarajan of The Hindu wrote, "The title suggests that the protagonists are an astute foursome who think and act ingeniously -- they do so too, for a while. But very soon the story and screenplay shift to a much-travelled track".
