= Nandha Periyasamy =

Indian film director

Nanda Periyasamy
- Born: 1975 (age 50–51); Madurai, Tamil Nadu
- Occupations: Film director, screenwriter, actor
- Years active: 2005 - present

Nanda Periyasamy (born 1975) is an Indian film director, screenwriter and actor who has worked in Tamil cinema.

== Career ==
His first film, Oru Kalluriyin Kathai (2005) received average reviews and a lukewarm response at the box office. Periyasamy then briefly worked on the pre-production of a film titled Ardhanari, which was later shelved. During a period of time, he also took on acting roles, notably appearing in Mayandi Kudumbathar (2009) alongside nine other directors. In his second film, Maathi Yosi (2010), he tackled sensitive issues like untouchability and casteism, and featured a predominantly new cast. The film received mixed reviews. He returned to directing in 2013 with Azhagan Azhagi, before making the romantic comedy Vanna Jigina in 2015. Nanda Periyasamy was seen playing villain roles in the movies Sandakozhi 2 (2018) and Market Raja MBBS (2019). Meanwhile, he emerged as the story writer of the Hindi film Rashmi Rocket (2021), starring Taapsee Pannu and directed by Akarsh Khurana.

He directed Anandham Vilayadum Veedu, which released in 2021. His next was the drama film, Thiru.Manickam (2024) starring Samuthirakani.

== Filmography ==
=== As director ===
| Year | Title | Notes |
|---|---|---|
| 2005 | Oru Kalluriyin Kathai | |
| 2010 | Maathi Yosi | |
| 2013 | Azhagan Azhagi | Also lyricist |
| 2015 | Vanna Jigina | |
| 2021 | Anandham Vilayadum Veedu | |
| 2024 | Thiru.Manickam | |

=== As actor ===
- Mayandi Kudumbathar (2009) as Chinna Virumaandi
- Yogi (2009)
- Milaga (2010)
- Goripalayam (2010) as Karutha Pandi
- Raa Raa (2011)
- Sandakozhi 2 (2018)
- Market Raja MBBS (2019)

=== As writer ===
- Rashmi Rocket (2021; Hindi)

== Awards ==
- Filmfare Award for Best Story - South for Rashmi Rocket (2022)
