= Miga Miga Avasaram =

2019 film directed by Suresh Kamatchi

- Poster
- Directed by: Suresh Kamatchi
- Written by: K. P. Jagan
- Produced by: Suresh Kamatchi; Vetrimaaran
- Starring: Sri Priyanka
- Cinematography: Balabharani
- Edited by: R. Sudharsan
- Music by: Ishaan Dev
- Production companies: V House Productions; Grass Root Film Company
- Release date: 8 November 2019
- Running time: 96 minutes
- Country: India
- Language: Tamil

Miga Miga Avasaram (transl. Very, very urgent) is a 2019 Indian Tamil-language action drama film directed by Suresh Kamatchi, in his directorial debut. The film, starring Sri Priyanka, is based on the gender inequality and harassment faced by female police officers. It was released on 8 November 2019. Sri Priyanka won Norway Tamil Film Festival Awards for Best Actress at Norway Tamil Film Festival Awards in 2020.

== Plot ==
Samandhi is a female cop who has been assigned the task to be an escort to a VIP coming from a different country to visit a popular festival in Bhavani Temple, Erode. After waiting for a long time patiently, she desperately feels like answering the nature’s call, but her senior officer makes sure that she goes through hell of a time without allowing her the permission for the same, thanks to his grudge on her.

== Cast ==
- Sri Priyanka as Samandhi
- Harish
- Sarathy
- Vazhakku En Muthuraman as Subharaj
- E. Ramdoss as Raj
- Linga as Samandhi's uncle
- Aandavan Kattalai Aravind as Thileepan
- Saravana Sakthi as Shankar
- V. K. Sundar as Sundar
- S. Vetri Kumaran
- Guna
- Benjamin as Marimuthu
- Kung Fu Arumugam
- Kadhal Arun Kumar
- Seeman in a special appearance

== Soundtrack ==
Ishaan Dev composed the film's soundtrack and director Cheran wrote a song.

Tracklist
No.	Title	Lyrics	Singer(s)	Length
1.	"Pennirkor Theemai Seythom"	Cheran	Ishaan Dev	2:37
Total length:				2:37

== Release ==
Upon release, Chief Minister Edappadi Palaniswamy viewed the film and recommended it be screened for 200 female police officers.

=== Reception ===
The Times of India gave the film a 2 out of 5 stars stating that "The only takeaway is the decent performance by Sri Priyanka, who managed to convey the harrowing experience women face during such situations". Deccan Chronicle gave the film two and a half out of five stars and wrote how "The writing could have been better and the length of the movie also plays spoilsport. Nevertheless, MMA is a well-intentioned film with a message. These small glitches can be overlooked".

== Accolades ==
Year	Award	Category	Nominee	Outcome	Ref.
2020	Norway Tamil Film Festival	Best Actress	Sri Priyanka	Won	
