= Suresh Kamatchi =

Indian film producer

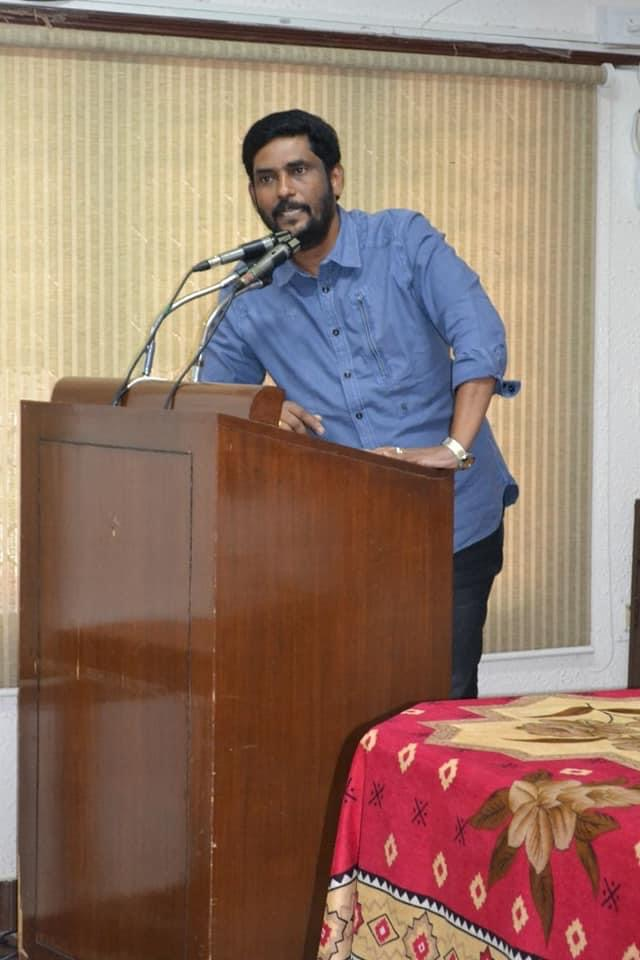
- Born: Suresh Kamatchi; Chennai, Tamil Nadu, India
- Occupations: Film producer, Film director and Screenwriter

Suresh Kamatchi is an Indian film producer, director and writer who predominantly works in Tamil movie Industry. He is known for producing the movie Maanaadu. He is the director and writer of the movie Miga Miga Avasaram, which raised the issue of the hardships faced by female police cops. After the release of the movie, Tamil Nadu Chief Minister M. K. Stalin announced that women police should not be posted as roadside security guards.

== Filmography ==
=== As producer ===
Year	Film	Notes		
Year	Film	Notes	2013	Nagaraja Cholan MA, MLA
2015	Kangaroo			
2019	Miga Miga Avasaram			
2021	Maanaadu			
2022	Jiivi 2			
2024	Rajakili	Also actor		
2025	Vanangaan			
2026	Salliyargal	Also distributor		
TBA	Yezhu Kadal Yezhu Malai			

=== As film director ===
Year	Title	Notes
2019	Miga Miga Avasaram	
