= Azhagan Azhagi =

2013 Indian film by Nandha Periyasamy

- Theatrical release poster
- Directed by: Nandha Periyasamy
- Produced by: S. Gururajan
- Starring: Jack Michael; Aarushi
- Edited by: Sashikumar
- Music by: Kannan
- Production companies: Sri Annamalaiyar Creations; Green 2 Cinema Productions
- Release date: 29 March 2013
- Country: India
- Language: Tamil

Azhagan Azhagi (sometimes Alagan Alagi; transl. Handsome man, beautiful woman) is a 2013 Indian Tamil-language romantic drama film directed by Nandha Periyasamy and starring Jack (who starred in Mohabbath) and Aarushi.

== Cast ==
- Michael Pradeep as Selva
- Aarushi as Jothi
- Chaams
- Aarthi as Rani
- A. Venkatesh as Rathinavel
- Ravi Mariya
- K. P. Jagan as Ganesan
- G. M. Kumar
- Rajyalakshmi
- Robo Shankar as Alasunder
- Rajasimman
- Kasthuri in a special appearance
- Srinivasan in a special appearance

== Production ==
The film stars 32 debutantes. The film was shot in Chennai, Karaikudi and Ramanathapuram. Srinivasan appeared in a promotional song.

== Soundtrack ==
Music by Kannan.

- "Nenjil Ninaipathu Ellam" written by Na. Muthukumar and sung by Naresh Iyer and Shweta Mohan
- "Mazhai Thuliya Nee" written by Kabilan and sung by Vijay Prakash
- "Ethu Varai Vanam" written by Kabilan and sung by Suchitra and Priya
- "Adada Azhaga" written by Snehan and sung by Chinnaponnu
- "Usilampatti" written by Kabilan and sung by Solar Sai and Priya
- "Penne Penne" written by Nanda Periyasamy, Karunanidhi, Raghu and Ravicharan and sung by Benny Dayal
- "Oh Girl" written and sung by Richard

== Reception ==
A critic from The Times of India opined that "Despite the predictable storyline, Alagan Alagi could have at least been bearable if the presentation had been engaging". Malini Mannath of The New Indian Express wrote that "A caravan ride to audition people for a TV show, Alagan Alagi has more to it".
