= Anandham Vilayadum Veedu =

2021 Indian film

- Theatrical release poster
- Directed by: Nandha Periyasamy
- Written by: Nandha Periyasamy
- Produced by: P Ranganathan
- Starring: Gautham Karthik; Cheran; Shivathmika Rajashekar; Saravanan
- Cinematography: Borra Bhalabharani
- Edited by: N. B. Srikanth
- Music by: Siddhu Kumar
- Production company: Sri Vaari Film
- Release date: 24 December 2021
- Running time: 140 minutes
- Country: India
- Language: Tamil

Anandham Vilayadum Veedu (transl. Home filled with happiness) is a 2021 Indian Tamil-language drama film written and directed by Nandha Periyasamy and produced by Sri Vaari Film. The film stars Gautham Karthik, Cheran and Shivathmika Rajasekhar with a supporting cast including Saravanan, Vignesh, Daniel Balaji, Rajendran, and Soundararaja. The film was released in theatres on 24 December 2021.

== Plot ==
Periya Aambalai (Joe Malloori) is an elderly man who has four children: three sons - Kasi (Saravanan), Pazhanisamy (Vignesh), Dharmaraj (Snehan) - and a daughter with his deceased first wife; and four sons - Muthupandi (Cheran), Azhagar (Nakkalites Chella), Selvam (Soundararaja), and Mahesh - with his second wife. Kasi has two children: Sakthivel (Gautham Karthik) and Selvi (Venba). Sakthi is in love with his friend Viji (Shivathmika Rajashekar). Muthupandi is very affectionate towards his half-brother Kasi and also employs his nephew Sakthi in his lorry business. However, Azhagar and Selvam have a grudge against their half brothers. Also, Muthupandi’s wife Vairam (Suzane George) hates Muthupandi’s closeness to his half brothers. Karuppan (Daniel Balaji) is an evil moneylender who loses his lorry business due to the growth of Muthupandi’s business and waits for an opportunity to destroy Muthupandi and his family.

When Selvi gets pregnant after marriage, Kasi decides to have the childbirth in their house, but since it is in bad shape, he decides to build a new house. Muthupandi offers his land to Kasi, who in return promises to build a house for the entire family of 30 members. The construction begins, and Karuppan starts plotting against them and creating rifts between the half-brothers. Karuppan sends some of his men as construction workers to instigate misunderstandings among the brothers, but Muthupandi solves them and manages the construction to proceed well. However, Azhagar and Selvam join hands with Karuppan and want the house construction to be stopped. One day, Muthupandi falls off from the stairs in the construction site and is hospitalized. During this time, a fight ensues between the half-brothers, and the construction activity gets stopped as per Karuppan’s plans. Muthupandi recovers and is shocked to know that the construction is halted. He gets furious and shouts at his wife and brothers. Muthupandi also reveals a flashback describing the reason for his closeness with Kasi.

In the flashback, it is shown that Muthupandi used to be a big-time gambler. He lost all his money in gambling and went to the extent of gambling by stealing the villagers’ money from Periya Aambalai, which was collected for temple function purposes. Muthupandi felt dejected of misusing temple funds and decided to commit suicide; however, Kasi borrowed money from his friend and ensured that the temple fund is placed back safely and also Muthupandi is saved. Muthupandi realized his mistake, and Kasi decided to not inform this to anyone. The film comes to the present, and Muthupandi’s wife and brothers realize their mistake and decide to patch up with Kasi.

However, Kasi is hit by a lorry as per Karuppan’s plan, and Karuppan takes Kasi hostage. Karuppan wants the land where the house construction is going on to be transferred to him and threatens to kill Kasi if they do not do so. The family agrees and signs the document. Sakthi takes the document to Karuppan upon which Kasi is admitted to the hospital. However, it is revealed that Sakthi ensured that the document would be invalid due to improper thumb impressions. Sakthi thrashes Karuppan and his henchmen. Kasi recovers and returns home. Their new home construction is complete, and everyone starts living in the same home happily.

== Cast ==
- Gautham Karthik as Sakthivel
- Cheran as Muthupandi
- Shivathmika Rajashekar as Viji
- Saravanan as Kasi
- Vignesh as Pazhanisamy
- Daniel Balaji as Karuppan
- Rajendran as Worker
- Singampuli as Sakkarapandi, Shakthi's maternal uncle
- Joe Malloori as Periya Aambalai
- Snehan as Dharmaraj
- Soundararaja as Selvam
- Nakkalites Chella as Azhagar
- Venba as Selvi, Sakthivel's sister
- Jangiri Madhumitha as Worker
- Sujatha Sivakumar as Muthamma
- Kathirravan as Inbarasu, Selvi's husband
- Suzane George as Vairam, Muthupandi's wife
- Sri Priyanka as Kayal, Muthamma's daughter
- Namo Narayana as Karuppan's uncle
- Mounika as Thangam, Kaasi's wife
- Munishraj as Ayyanar
- Nakkalites Dhanam as Pandiyamma
- Supergood Subramani as Worker

== Production ==
In November 2020, it was reported that the filmmaker Nandha Periyasamy was planning to make Mayandi Kudumbathar 2, a spiritual sequel to the film Mayandi Kudumbathar (2009), with Gautham Karthik in the lead role. The pair subsequently collaborated for a separate family drama through Anandham Vilayadum Veedu.

== Soundtrack ==
Anandham Vilayadum Veedu

Soundtrack album by Siddhu Kumar
- Released: 2021
- Studio: Krimson Avenue Studios
- Genre: Soundtrack
- Length: 13:50
- Language: Tamil
- Label: Vasy Music

Siddhu Kumar chronology
Bachelor (2021)	Anandham Vilayadum Veedu (2021)	Kannai Nambathey (2023)

The soundtrack and score is composed by Siddhu Kumar and the album featured four songs.

Track listing
No.	Title	Lyrics	Singer(s)	Length
1.	"Ne En Usuru Pulla"	Snehan	G. V. Prakash Kumar, Sivaangi Krish	3:18
2.	"Sonthamulla Vazhkai"	Snehan	Karunguil Ganesan	3:00
3.	"Katti Karumbe"	Snehan	Saisharan, Vishnupriya Ravi	3:15
4.	"Sonthathurkul Suzhchi"	Snehan	Karunguil Ganesan	4:17

== Release ==
=== Theatrical ===
Anandham Vilayadum Veedu was released in theatres on 24 December 2021.

=== Home media ===
The film began streaming on ZEE5 from 11 February 2022.

== Reception ==
Ram Venkat Srikar of Cinema Express rated the film with 2.5/5 stars, stating that, "When we walk into the film, we know what we are walking into and that’s exactly what we get. Beneath the flaws, the melodrama, a host of squawking characters, there’s some heart to be found in this family drama, but it needed more. In other words, the foundation is strong enough, but it needed a stronger build." M Suganth of The Times of India gave a rating of 2 out on 5 and wrote, "A family drama with contrived writing and TV serial-level making." Sify rated the film with 2/5 stars, criticizing that, "Anandham Vilayadum Veedu is for audiences who love TV serials and family dramas from the 80s." and gave the final verdict as Below Average. Bharat Kumar of News Today wrote, "The film is cringe at places and fails to leave an emotional connect. But Nandha Periyasamy can be lauded for taking up a movie with a good message."
