= Arish Kumar =

Indian actor

- Born: 20 September; Chennai, Tamil Nadu
- Occupation: Actor
- Years active: 2006-Present
- Spouse: Abinaya (m. 2015; div. 2017)

Arish Kumar is an Indian actor known for his work in Tamil cinema. He has frequently appeared in multi-starrer films.

== Career ==
Arish Kumar is the son of Editor Kumar, of the editing duo Ganesh–Kumar, who worked extensively under K. Balachander's Kavithalayaa Productions.

He made his acting debut in Idhu Kadhal Varum Paruvam (2006), a coming-of-age film directed by Kasthuri Raja, where he played a youngster infatuated with an older woman, portrayed by Kiran Rathod. He followed this with Pugaippadam (2010), a film centered on friendship, emphasizing that academics and career aspirations should take precedence over romantic relationships among friends.

Later in 2010, Arish appeared in Maathi Yosi, a film set against the backdrop of a Dalit colony that portrayed prevailing caste dynamics. The same year, he played one of the leads in Goripalayam, directed by Rasu Madhuravan, where he played a rebellious youngster. He continued his collaboration with Madhuravan in Muthukku Muthaaga (2011), a family drama highlighting the emotional bonds and sacrifices between parents and children.

In 2019, he appeared in Miga Miga Avasaram as Sri Priyanka's love interest.

== Filmography ==
Year	Film	Role	Notes
2006	Idhu Kadhal Varum Paruvam	Surya	
2010	Pugaippadam	Bala	
2010	Maathi Yosi	Pandi	
2010	Goripalayam	Azhagar	
2011	Muthukku Muthaaga	Selvam	
2014	Ninaithathu Yaaro	Himself	Cameo appearance
2014	Netru Indru	Narayanan	
2014	Kaadhal 2014	Baskar	
2015	Vethu Vettu	Machaikaalai	
2019	Miga Miga Avasaram		

=== Television ===
Year	Title	Role	Network
2023	Label	Arul Kumaran	Disney+ Hotstar
