= Raghuvannan =

Indian actor (born 1984)

- Born: 24 February 1984 (age 42); Madras, Tamil Nadu, India
- Other names: Ragavendran, Raghuvannan
- Occupation: Actor
- Years active: 2002–present
- Spouse: Abigail Manivannan
- Children: 2
- Father: Manivannan

Raghu Manivannan (born 24 February 1984) is an Indian actor, who has appeared in Tamil cinema. The son of actor Manivannan, he has appeared in films including Maaran (2002) and Nagaraja Cholan MA, MLA (2013).

== Career ==
Raghu Manivannan made his debut with the Sathyaraj-starrer Maaran (2002), with a critic from The Hindu stating "as the studious first year medical college student suits the character so well, that you forget that the lad is just acting out a role". He subsequently failed to get bigger film offers and worked on a couple of low-budget ventures and shelved films including Kadhal Valarthen, where he worked with Manoj Bharathiraja and Kunal. In 2013, Raghu Manivannan played a leading role alongside Sathyaraj in his father's 50th directorial venture, Nagaraja Cholan MA, MLA. He had also signed up to act in his father's next project Thalattu Machi Thalattu, but the film was cancelled after Manivannan died in June 2013.

In February 2015, Raghu Manivannan announced that he was working towards directing a remake of his father's Nooravathu Naal (1984). He began scripting the film to adapt it to modern day audiences, while signing on Natty Subramaniam to portray the lead role.

== Filmography ==
Year	Film	Role	Notes
2002	Maaran	Sudhandhiram	
2008	Thodakkam	Vanchinathan	
2010	Goripalayam	Azhagappan	
2011	Thamizh Desam		
2013	Nagaraja Cholan MA, MLA	Gangaikondaan	
