= Guru Kalyan =

GGM
- Also known as: GGM, Guru
- Born: Ganesan Guru Moorthy
- Genre: Film score,
- Occupations: Composer, music director, singer, instrumentalist,
- Instrument: Keyboard
- Years active: 2009–present

GGM is an Indian film music composer who primarily works in Tamil films. Debut movie Maathi Yosi in the screen name of "Guru Kalyan" in 2010 was nominated for "Best Debutant Music Director" by Vijay Music Awards 2010.

Apart from films, GGM has composed music for short films and independent music albums.

== Filmography ==
Year	Film	Language	Notes
2010	Maathi Yosi	Tamil	
2010	Kotti	Tamil	
2016	Gugan	Tamil	
2018	Kural 146	Tamil	in production

== Music albums ==
Year	Album	Language	Lyrics	Notes
2017	Thathai Thathai	Tamil	Kaaveri Raja	Children's Day Special
2017	Vadhuvai NanManam	Tamil	Palani Bharathi	Save Nature
2017	Veera Thamizhan	Tamil	Rasi Azhagappan	
2017	Thakodhu Thakodhu	Telugu		Produced by J.T.Sathishkumar, Actors Shivan and Anjali
2017	Ilayathalapathy Rasigan Daa	Tamil	Palani Bharathi	
2017	Thamizhachiye	Tamil	Ezhil Vendan	Stop Violence against women
2018	Manidha Manidha Ezhundhu Vaa	Tamil	GGM	Inspiring Motivation Song
2018	DWBH Song	Tamil	Antonio Samuel	
2018	Udu Mamae ZeroistheHero	Tamil	Rasi Azhagappan	Zero is the Hero
2018	#MEMESONG	Tamil	GGM	Memes are 'modern mimicry'. Memes can bring a lot good social changes
2018	Naalai Unadhe	Tamil	Ezhil Vendan	Inspiring Motivation Song
2018	ALLAH MALIK	-	-	A song dedicated to LORD SHIRDI SAI BABA on the occasion of Sai's 100th year of MAHASAMADHI.
2018	TAKE THINGS EASY - LIFE IS CRAZY	Tamil	Kalaimamani Crazy Mohan	Children's Day Special Music Video
2018	WELCOME 2.0	Tamil	Arun Vaali	Celebrating the release of 2.0 - the movie
2019	உள்ளம் உருகுதய்யா	Tamil	முருகர் பக்த சிரோன்மணி திருமதி.ஆண்டவன் பிச்சை	A Retro Remix of the famous "Ullam Uruguthaiya" song
2019	தமிழா நீ நெருப்பு	Tamil	Iyakkunar Imayam Bharathiraja	Tribute to Jallikattu
2019	கண்கொள்ளா காட்சி	Tamil	Thapoo Sankar	Thapoovanam Production
2019	Amrithavarshini	Tamil	Instrumental	Let it Rain, dedicated to Chennaiites
2019	சுவாமி சமர்த்த குரு மந்திரம்	Tamil	-	SWAMI SAMARTH AKKALKOT MAHARAJ GURU SHLOKA
2019	Bigil Fan Theme Music	Tamil	-	Thalapathy Rasigan Da 2
2019	Bigil Animoji Music Video	Tamil	Dr. ECR P Saravanan	India's first animoji music video for Thalapathy Vijay
2019	ஓடோடி வருவோமே சாயி	Tamil	GGM	Dedicated at the Lotus feet of Shirdi Sai Baba
2019	சாயி ஆலிங்கனம் / Sai Aalinganam	Tamil	Thiruvalluvan / திருவள்ளுவன்	An atma (Thiruvalluvan) addresses Sai Baba as his "beloved" and prays for his blessings to become one with him. Produced by Sri Thiruvalluvan
2019	அத்தி வரதர் / Athi Varadar	Tamil	kaviyarasu Kannadasan	Legacy of Athi Varadar, Kanchipuram who comes out of the water once in 40 years.
2019	Musical Honour to AVM / தெற்கு இந்தியாவின் ஹாலிவுட் பிம்பம் ஏ.வி.எம்	Tamil	Instrumental	The Journey of Iconic AVM Production house and Journey of Indian Music.
2019	Krishna Sai	Tamil	-	Devotional Song on behalf of Krishna Jayanthi.
2019	The Music of Quintet	-	Instrumental	-
2019	Om Sri Sai	-	-	Meditation Music on Lord Shirdi Sai Baba
2019	Swagath Karthe Hein	Hindi	-	Tribute to Chulbul Pandey from the movie Dabangg
2019	Chinna Payale	Tamil	Pattukkottai KalyanaSundaram	Children's Day song
2019	Kaadhal to Thirumanam	Tamil	Thapoo Sankar	Thapoovanam
2019	Dil Se	Hindi	Jaya Wahi	Devotional album on Shirdi Sai

== Short films ==
Year	Short Film	Language	Notes
2010	Kakki	Tamil	Lead Actor Karunakaran
2013	Nandha Rajavamsam	Tamil	A story of "Rewind" technique
2017	ISHA	Tamil	A short love story. Nominated at 7th Dada Saheb Phalke Film Festival, Won Special Festival Mention award at 6th DSFF. Directed by Uma Shankar
2018	Rajeeni	Tamil	Social media superstar - Directed by Karthik O Positive
2018	Netrikann	Tamil	Short story against child abuse and sexual harassment - Directed by Karthik O Positive
2019	Oru Naa Kaathu	Tamil	A you turn documentary on the "Gaja" cyclone that hit the Delta regions of Tamil Nadu
2019	Naan Roja Pesugiren	Tamil	A man gives a woman a rose to express his love
2019	Santhosham 2	Tamil	For Nalaya Iyakkunar Season 6 directed by Karthik O Positive
