= Muthukku Muthaaga =

- Poster
- Directed by: Rasu Madhuravan
- Written by: Rasu Madhuravan
- Produced by: Rasu Madhuravan
- Starring: Vikranth; Natraj; Harish; Oviya; Monica
- Cinematography: U. K. Senthil Kumar
- Music by: Kavi Periyathambi
- Production company: Pandiyanadu Theatres
- Release date: 18 March 2011
- Running time: 147 minutes
- Country: India
- Language: Tamil

Muthukku Muthaaga (transl. Pearl to pearl) is a 2011 Indian Tamil language drama film written, produced, and directed by Rasu Madhuravan. It features an ensemble cast including Vikranth, Natraj, Harish, Oviya, Monica, Prakash, Veerasamar, Ilavarasu, and Saranya Ponvannan. The film revolves around the relationship between parents and their children. The music was composed by Kavi Periyathambi, while cinematography was done by U. K. Senthil Kumar. The film was released on 18 March 2011. Ilavarasu won the Ananda Vikatan Cinema Award for Best Character Actor.

== Plot ==
Thavasi and Pechi, an elderly retired couple, live in Madurai, Tamil Nadu. They have five sons, Bose, Raman, Selvam, Lakshmanan, and Pandi, and work hard to support them despite earning a limited income. Raman, their eldest son, is a government school teacher who marries Rasathi, the daughter of Pechi's childhood friend. Due to the demands of his job, Raman leaves Madurai with Rasathi after their wedding. Their second son, Lakshmanan, falls in love with Vasanthi, the daughter of a wealthy businessman who insists that Lakshmanan live with him and Vasanthi. Pechi and Thavasi let Lakshmanan relocate to his father-in-law's household, prioritizing their son's happiness.

Bose, the third son, falls in love with Annamayil, a nurse at a local hospital. Unaware of this, Thavasi and Pechi arrange Bose's wedding with Panju, the daughter of a relative. Bose agrees to the arrangement because he does not want to upset his parents, and Annamayil reluctantly accepts Bose's decision. After Thavasi witnesses Panju verbally abusing Bose, he encourages them to move into a separate house and live as a nuclear family.

The fourth son, Pandi, frequently struggles with schoolwork. One of his rich friends attempts to blackmail Rasathi's sister, whom Pandi is attracted to, with a video of Rasathi changing her clothes; an infuriated Pandi kills his friend and is jailed. Selvam, the youngest son, gets a job in information technology; he moves to the city for work and falls in love with Swetha, a coworker. After Selvam's departure, Thavasi and Pechi are left alone.

Pechi is diagnosed with asthma. Hoping to reconnect with their sons' families, Pechi and Thavasi visit Raman. While Raman warmly welcomes them, Rasathi resents their arrival and berates Raman for spending money on them instead of her own parents. After realizing her attitude, Thavasi and Pechi leave, not wanting to cause trouble. Meanwhile, Lakshmanan returns to his parents' home and reveals that he is frequently mistreated by his in-laws. Vasanthi, his caring wife, follows him home. Pechi and Thavasi take the couple back to Vasanthi's parents, who show contempt for them.

While visiting the hospital for an asthma check-up, Pechi meets Annamayil. Seeing her kind and caring attitude, Pechi regrets not marrying her to Bose. Pechi and Thavasi later visit Bose to see their grandson, only to find that Panju has taken him to her mother's house. Bose visits his in-laws, who send their grandson back with Bose. Panju makes a scene when Pechi caresses her grandson, causing Bose and Panju to have an argument. Panju directs her anger at Pechi, telling her to die instead of causing trouble, and a saddened Pechi leaves with Thavasi. Fed up with loneliness and family troubles, Pechi decides to commit suicide with Thavasi.

With the help of Swetha, Selvam arranges for Pechi to visit an asthma specialist, and returns to Madurai to take his parents on a flight. Pandi, who is bailed out of jail with his brothers' support, also returns. The five brothers reunite, but are suddenly attacked by the brothers of Pandi's victim. Bose is able to defuse the conflict by explaining that Pandi was protecting his family's honour.

Meanwhile, Pechi mixes poison into lamb curry, serves it to Thavasi, and eats it herself. Thavasi, realizing the food is poisoned, eats it without complaint. As the old couple sits together, Thavasi asks Pechi if he was able to keep her happy during their many years together. Pechi, understanding that Thavasi is aware he has been poisoned, explains that she does not want to leave him alone with their abusive daughter-in-law, and wants them to go to the afterlife together. Thavasi accepts her decision. In her dying moments, Pechi expresses regret for not being able to see Pandi and Selvam, but consoles herself knowing they are responsible individuals who will be able to take care of themselves after she is gone.

The five brothers arrive to meet their parents, but are heartbroken to find that they have passed away. During the funeral, Rasathi learns of Pandi's sacrifice to save her honour, and asks Pandi and her husband for forgiveness. Meanwhile, Panju fakes an outburst of grief in order to gain sympathy from nearby onlookers. An infuriated Bose exposes her deceit and attacks her, but is stopped by Raman, who reminds him that their parents wanted them to live happily with their daughters-in-law.

Following the funeral, Selvam marries Swetha. Rasathi's sister later reveals to Pandi that she loves him, and they get married as well.

== Cast ==
- Vikranth as Bose
- Natraj as Raman
- Harish as Selvam
- Ilavarasu as Thavasi
- Saranya Ponvannan as Pechi
- Prakash as Lakshmanan
- Veerasamar as Pandi
- Oviya as Swetha
- Monica as Annamayil
- Singampuli as Sachin Tendulkar aka Suruttu
- K.P. Jagan
- Varshini as Vasanthi
- Sujibala as Raasathi
- Gayathri Yuvaraj as Gayathri
- Janaki as Panchavarnam
- Jayalakshmi as Virumayi
- Raj Kapoor as Thavasi's relative
- Vaiyapuri
- Scissor Manohar

== Production ==
It was initially reported that Oviya, after the success of Kalavani (2010), increased her remuneration for starring in this film. Oviya dismissed these reports, along with rumours of a rift between her and the director Rasu Madhuravan. Monica, after a chance meeting with Madhuravan, accepted to star in the film after he narrated the script to her. Nassar was the original choice for the role that later went to Ilavarasu. In July 2011, W. Hansraj Saxena, then the COO of Sun Pictures, was arrested under the Indian Penal Code Sections 406 (criminal breach of trust) and 420 (cheating) after he was found guilty of buying the film's satellite rights from Madhuravan for ₹50 lakh (equivalent to ₹1.1 crore or US$120,000 in 2023), less than half of the promised amount, and refusing to pay the remaining money.

== Soundtrack ==
The soundtrack was composed by Kavi Periyathambi. The audio rights were acquired by Ishtar Music.

Track listing
No.	Title	Lyrics	Singer(s)	Length
1.	"Enna Panni Tholacha"	Na. Muthukumar	Vijay Yesudas, Chinmayi Sripada	4:36
2.	"Man Vaasam Veesum" (female)	Uma Subramanian	Harini	3:14
3.	"Oru Sudidhar Poo"	Kavi Periyathambi	Haricharan, Dr. Lavanya	4:26
4.	"Man Vaasam Veesum" (male)	Uma Subramanian	Madhu Balakrishnan	2:44
5.	"Ennanra Nee Ennanra"	Nandalala	Krishna Iyer, Mukesh Mohamed, Roshini	4:16
6.	"Vanakkam"	Nandalala	Sriram, Mukesh Mohamed, Janani	4:31
7.	"Kaathadicha Noagumunnu"	Rasu Madhuravan	Krishna Raj	2:59
Total length:				26:46

== Critical reception ==
Malathi Rangarajan of The Hindu wrote, "Worthy performances make [Muthukku Muthaaga] watchable, and topping the list in the acting category are Saranya and Ilavarasu, who play the parents of five sons. Madhuravan scores with a fairly neat narration". The New Indian Express wrote, "Repeating the same theme from film to film, the director seems to have exhausted all his ideas. It's better that he re-invent himself and shift genres". Sify wrote that the film "could have been made into a smash hit daily soap had it been pitched to a small screen producer", and noted its lack of originality. The critic praised the performances of Ilavarasu, Saranya and Singampuli, but felt Oviya and Monica were wasted, and criticised the music.
