= Oru Kalluriyin Kathai =

- DVD cover
- Directed by: Nandha Periyasamy
- Written by: Nandha Periyasamy
- Produced by: Sakthi Sanghavi; Mohana Sanghavi
- Starring: Arya; Sonia Agarwal
- Cinematography: R. Madhi
- Edited by: Kola Bhaskar
- Music by: Yuvan Shankar Raja
- Production company: Chozha Creations
- Release date: 2 September 2005
- Running time: 156 minutes
- Country: India
- Language: Tamil

Oru Kalluriyin Kathai (transl. The story of a college) is a 2005 Indian Tamil-language romantic drama film written and directed by newcomer Nandha Periyasamy. It stars Arya and Sonia Agarwal, while Jai Varma, Santhanam, and Charuhasan play supporting roles. The music was composed by Yuvan Shankar Raja with editing by Kola Bhaskar and cinematography by R. Madhi. The film was released in 2005 and was deemed a success upon its release.

== Plot ==
Moorthy is excited to meet his close friend Satya and their other college friends at a reunion after five years, seemingly planned after Satya's letter. Unfortunately, Satya's father comes only to inform them that he is in a coma. The psycho-test conducted by his doctor makes Satya reveal some incidents that happened in the early years of his college life. He had fallen in love with Jothi after she helped him board a train he was about to miss. When Jothi joined the same college where he studied, he was overjoyed, as he could see her more often. However, he never confessed his love to her, and this continued until farewell day when he heard Jothi advising her friend about this. Satya's narration ends here, as he begins shouting in the doctor's room.

Following the doctor's advice, Satya's friends – Moorthy, Chandru, David, and a few others – decide to follow a recreational treatment for 30 days to help Satya wake up from the coma. They contact almost all the students, their retired principal, and lecturers from the 2000 batch to help with this treatment. They find Jothi engaged, but Moorthy hides the truth that Satya loves Jothi to make her agree to their plan, and she agrees. The group of students then transforms their current college (2005) into the college as it was in 2000. Satya is brought to the college and slowly begins to believe it is the same time when he studied. He is reminded of his love for Jothi and starts waiting for the farewell day, just as he was waiting five years ago.

Even Jothi realises that Satya had loved her in the past, and the entire plan is to make Satya propose to her on the farewell day. She angrily quits the plan and goes home. On the night before the farewell day, Satya realises that he is in 2005, not 2000 as he had thought. Slowly, he begins to remember what exactly happened five years ago on the farewell day. Satya is seen waiting for Jothi outside a temple to confess his love when a corrupt police officer, with whom he had a previous altercation, attacks him. He suddenly wakes up and returns to the present day, realising his friends have recreated their entire college days after five years.

On the farewell day, Jothi returns to college, and Satya's friends force him to propose to Jothi. Satya goes to Jothi and asks her to stop acting, as his friends had asked, and not to cheat herself. He thanks her for saving him for the second time and walks away without expressing his love. Jothi runs to Satya and says she needs him, regretting wasting the five years not knowing his love for her. The couple then hugs, and the college students cheer.

== Cast ==
- Arya as Satya
- Sonia Agarwal as Jothi
- Jaivarma as Moorthy
- Sashi as Chandru
- Santhanam as David
- Anandsami as Guru
- Ravikumar as Satya's father
- Mouli as Principal
- Charle as Lecturer Azhagusundaram
- Pyramid Natarajan as College Correspondent
- Periyar Dasan as Munusamy, college security guard
- Baburaj as a corrupt police officer
- Charuhasan as Doctor
- Thalaivasal Vijay as Taxi Driver
- Vasu Vikram
- Kovai Senthil as Nair, canteen cook
- Manju
- Sai Madhavi

== Soundtrack ==
The music was composed by Yuvan Shankar Raja, with lyrics penned by Na. Muthukumar. R. Rangaraj of Chennai Online wrote Yuvan "songs for 'Oru Kalluriyin Kadhai' are an apt example of Yuvan's perception and understanding of the demands of the market. Yet, he is able to provide something distinctive in the overall delivery, presentation and packaging of the songs".

No.	Title	Singer(s)	Length
1.	"Kadhal Enbathu"	Harish Raghavendra, Chinmayi	5:25
2.	"Kangal Kalangida"	Karthik	4:54
3.	"Kangal Kandadhu"	KK, Sujatha Mohan	4:50
4.	"Pangu Podu"	KK, Ranjith	4:04
5.	"Unakku Endru Oruthi"	Unni Menon	1:07
6.	"Dhalappa Kattuda"	Palakkad Sreeram	3:03
7.	"Kangal Kandadhu" (film version, included in the soundtrack)	Ranjith, Ganga	4:48
8.	"Geetha Mela"	Devan, Ranjith, Sounder Rajan	3:55
9.	"Kadhal Enbathu" (film version, not included in the soundtrack)	Ranjith, Chinmayi	4:17

== Critical reception ==
Sify wrote "On the whole Oru Kalooriyin Kathai is too high-concept for our audience with a slow paced narration that goes back and forth with a predictable climax." G. Ulaganathan of Deccan Herald wrote, "Weird and depressing. That in a nutshell is Oru Kalluriyin Kadhai [...] Yuvan Shankar Raja’s music is the only saving grace". Lajjavathi of Kalki wrote that the story is good but called the screenplay, dialogues and direction as average and most of the scenes did not stay in the mind and advised Arya to concentrate more on script selection.
