= Pandi (film) =

- Theatrical release poster
- Directed by: Rasu Madhuravan
- Written by: Rasu Madhuravan
- Produced by: V. Hitesh Jhabak
- Starring: Raghava Lawrence; Sneha; Namitha
- Cinematography: U. K. Senthil Kumar
- Edited by: Suresh Urs
- Music by: Srikanth Deva
- Production company: Nemichand Jhabak
- Release date: 23 May 2008
- Running time: 146 minutes
- Country: India
- Language: Tamil

Pandi is a 2008 Indian Tamil-language masala film written and directed by Rasu Madhuravan. It stars Raghava Lawrence and Sneha in the lead roles, while Namitha, Nassar, Saranya Ponvannan, and Sriman play supporting roles. The film was released on 23 May 2008. It was an average success.

== Plot ==
Pandi does menial jobs in Malaysia and saves every penny he earns and sends it to his family in Usilampatti. He reveals his flashback to his friends.

Pandi was a carefree youth who was often chided by his father Sundarapandi. His elder brother Rajapandi is the blue-eyed boy of his father. However, Pandi's mother Sivagami showers all her love and affection on him. His mother has a dream of building her own house in her land. Rajapandi asks Pandi to go to a marriage ceremony. While on the train, he met Bhuvana, a cop's daughter in the other village, and after a sequence of events, romance blossoms between them.

One afternoon, Bhuvana gives all the money she has on her person to Pandi and convinces him to take her out to lunch at a restaurant. After eating his lunch, he went outside to wash his hands and saw his sister and her boyfriend having a conversation. Pandi chases the motorbike on an auto, leaving Bhuvana stuck with the bill and no money, having given it all to Pandi. When Pandi eventually catches up with the boyfriend, the boyfriend tells him that they are seriously in love, and he is going to be coming over to their place with his parents to ask for her hand in marriage. Everything was going well until a couple days later, Sundarapandi wanted the money to buy the jewellery. Pandi's family receives a shock as Sivagami cannot find the money that they have saved up to pay for the wedding. Since Pandi is already a known troublemaker and has been to jail already, Sundarapandi blames Pandi and kicks him out of the house. This happens in front of Bhuvana, who has come to see where he has been the last few days and why he ran away at the restaurant. This incident with Sundarapandi accusing Pandi of taking the money has convinced her that he took her money the other day and ran and also just using her. In the end, it turns out that Rajapandi has run away from the house with his lover and with the money.

Pandi consoles Sundarapandi. Pandi borrows money from a private money lender and completes the wedding. Meanwhile, Pandi tries to make amends with Bhuvana, but she will not hear any of it. Sundarapandi, seeing the argument, went over and told Bhuvana the truth and how he misjudged his son and that it was not him who took the money. The following day, Sundarapandi went to Bhuvana's house to ask her father Periyamaayan to fix a marriage between Pandi and Bhuvana. Periyamaayan, upon hearing this, gets furious. He is the local police inspector and knows all about Pandi's past. He refuses to marry his daughter to a criminal. Periyamaayan arranges a marriage for Bhuvana, but she went to Sundarapandi to say that she will die before marrying another person than Pandi. Pandi snatched Bhuvana from her house, takes her to the police station, and asks her father to approve of their marriage. Periyamaayan gets angry and says that Bhuvana is not his daughter any more and that he will think his daughter eloped and lost. Pandi marries Bhuvana and as police protection, Periyamaayan watches her getting married.

Determined to pay back the loan and help his family overcome their financial constraint, Pandi decides to go abroad and work as conservancy staff. He manages to stabilise his family with his earnings as well as pays back the debts to the private money lender.

In the present, Pandi returns to Usilampatti from Malaysia. His friends and family cry after seeing him. He is shocked to find his mother dead. His friends reveals that his mother's death was not natural, so he decides to avenge the killers. He finds that Sundarapandi's colleague hired a killer to kill him using a lorry, and his mother died, as a result. He beats him up at the local temple festival. When Pandi takes a knife to kill him, he refused knowing his duty towards his family, and decides to leave it in hands of God.

== Cast ==
- Raghava Lawrence as Pandi Sundarapandi
- Sneha as Bhuvana Periyamaayan, later Bhuvana Pandi, Pandi's wife
- Namitha as Salangai
- Nassar as Sundarapandi, Pandi's father
- Saranya Ponvannan as Sivagami Sundarapandi, Pandi's mother
- Sriman as Rajapandi Sundarapandi, Pandi's older brother
- Ilavarasu as Periyamaayan, Bhuvana's father
- Ganja Karuppu as Thalaiathi, Pandi's friend
- Mayilsamy as Mokkaisamy, Pandi's friend
- Vaiyapuri as Thief
- Chitti Babu as Police inspector
- Raj Kapoor as Kothalam, Sundarapandi's enemy
- Singamuthu as Train Ticket Collector
- Bava Lakshmanan as Pandi's friend
- Periya Karuppu Thevar as Proposed groom's relative
- Chelladurai as Proposed groom's relative
- Maayi Sundar as Pandi's friend

== Soundtrack ==
The soundtrack was composed by Srikanth Deva. It features a remixed version of the song "Maasimaasam" from Dharma Durai (1991).

Song	Singers	Lyrics
"Un Kangal"	Raghava Lawrence, Jey	Na. Muthukumar
"Oorai Suthum"	Senthildass Velayutham	Nanadala
"Pattayakilappu"	Naveen Madhav, Anuradha Sriram	Nanadala
"Aatha Nee"	Deva	Nanadala
"Aadiadangum"	Senthildass Velayutham, Grace Karunas	Nanadala
"Kuthu Madhippa"	Suchitra, Benny Dayal	Perarasu
"Masimaasam" Remix	Sathyan, Megha	Panchu Arunachalam

== Critical reception ==
Sify wrote, "[Lawrence] has one single expression throughout Pandi whether he is sad, happy, singing songs or fighting! Added to that it is a typical mass masala film that leaves you with a migraine". Malathi Rangarajan of The Hindu gave a more positive review, saying the film "transcends melodrama, thanks to commendable performances from veterans Nasser, [Saranya] and Ilavarasu". She added that Lawrence "is convincing enough as the small town school dropout who works abroad as a labourer", and "Credible story, racy narration and natural dialogue are the other appealing aspects of Paandi". The film was also reviewed by Benina of Kalki.
