= Mayandi Kudumbathar =

- Title card
- Directed by: Rasu Madhuravan
- Written by: Rasu Madhuravan
- Produced by: S. K. Selvakumar
- Starring: Manivannan; Ponvannan; Seeman; K. P. Jagannath; Tarun Gopi; G. M. Kumar; Ravi Mariya; Nandha Periyasamy; Singampuli; Raj Kapoor
- Cinematography: Balabarani
- Edited by: Suresh Urs
- Music by: Sabesh–Murali
- Production company: United Arts
- Release date: 5 June 2009
- Country: India
- Language: Tamil

Mayandi Kudumbathar (transl. Mayandi's family) is a 2009 Indian Tamil-language drama film written and directed by Rasu Madhuravan. It stars ten Tamil film directors, including Manivannan, Seeman, Tarun Gopi, Ponvannan, Raj Kapoor and K. P. Jagannath in lead and supporting roles. The film, edited by Suresh Urs, scored by Sabesh–Murali and photographed by Balabarani, was released on 5 June 2009 and become a success. It won the Tamil Nadu State Film Award for Second Best Film.

== Plot ==
The film is set in the backdrop of a village near Usilampatti, in Madurai district. Mayandi and Virumandi are siblings with disputes over settling their properties. Mayandi insists giving a portion of their ancestral properties to their stepsister, for which Virumandi does not agree. This creates enmity in Virumandi and his sons against Mayandi and his family.

Mayandi has four sons – Thavasi, Virumandi, Cheenisamy and Paraman – and one daughter – Mayakka. All the sons except Paraman are married, and they live as a joint family. Paraman falls in love with his schoolmate Poongodi. He gets admission into engineering, and Mayandi sells a portion of his land to pay fees for Paraman. This angers the wives of Thavasi and Virumandi. They keep insisting on partitioning the properties between four sons, thinking that Mayandi is spending more for the education of Paraman, while the other three sons are not educated properly. However, Paraman's brothers are actually so affectionate towards him, and they prefer staying together. Suddenly, Mayandi dies due to an electric shock when he steps over a wire unknowingly. Now, the wives of Thavasi and Virumandi again keep insisting on doing the property partition. Their plan gets executed: the properties get partitioned into three, leaving Paraman as his portion was already sold by Mayandi to pay the college fees.

Paraman could not bear his father's death, and Poongodi shows affection to him. Poongodi gets admission into Madras Medical College, and she leaves to Chennai for education, though she keeps talking to Paraman regularly on the phone. Paraman continues his engineering course while he is considered as a burden by his sisters-in-law. However, his brothers take care of him. One day, Thavasi's wife falls sick, and she needs blood urgently. As it is a rare group, it becomes difficult. Paraman informs this to his friends in college, and his friends come for rescue. Thavasi's wife is saved, and she realises her mistake and feels bad for ill-treating Paraman despite which he helped her in a timely manner.

Paraman secures a job through campus placement, and his living condition improves. One day, he gets shocked to see Poongodi in a bus stop along with her husband and a baby. Paraman cries upon thinking that Poongodi has betrayed him. However, Poongodi tells a flashback that her "husband" is actually her relative who lost his leg in an accident on the day of the marriage, following which the marriage gets cancelled. Now, her parents request Poongodi to marry the groom as it would be an insult for the entire family due to a cancelled marriage. Poongodi, though not interested, accepts for the sake of her family's wishes. Still, she kept calling Paraman over the phone in the usual manner so that he will not get broken and instead will concentrate on studies. Knowing the truth, Paraman feels happy about Poongodi's kind heart and her sacrifice for the welfare of her family.

Finally, Paraman meets Virumandi and cries to him to lead a joint life along with everyone. He also wins the heart of Virumandi and his sons also and marries his aunt's daughter.

== Cast ==
- Manivannan as Mayandi
- Ponvannan as Thavasi Mayandi
- Seeman as Virumandi Mayandi
- K. P. Jagannath as Cheenichamy Mayandi
- Tarun Gopi as Paraman Mayandi
- G. M. Kumar as Virumandi
- Ravi Mariya as Chokkan Virumandi
- Nandha Periyasamy as Chinnu Virumandi
- Singampuli as Mayandi Virumandi
- Raj Kapoor as Sonakkaruppu
- Ilavarasu as Mayandi and Virumandi's elder cousin
- Mayilsamy as Mayandi and Virumandi's younger cousin
- Bava Lakshmanan
- Vaiyapuri
- Poongodi as Poongodi
- Poovitha as Thavamani Thavasi
- Kaniya as Pavunu Virumandi
- Hemalatha as Dhanam Cheenichamy
- Deepa Shankar as Mayakka Sonakkarupu
- Priya as Azhagamma
- Thamizharasi as Pecchi

== Soundtrack ==
The soundtrack was composed by Sabesh–Murali.

Track listing
No.	Title	Singer(s)	Length
1.	"Mudhal Mazhaye"	Balram, Saindhavi
2.	"Pesama Pesama"	Seeman
3.	"Poottu Siricha"	Krishnaraj, Sabesh
4.	"Onna Thangave"	Vijay Yesudas
5.	"Kalavaniye"	Ranjith
6.	"Poo Mudhal"	Prasanna

== Critical reception ==
Pavithra Srinivasan of Rediff.com wrote, "Sometimes, there's a strong whiff of Vikraman's screenplay, especially when Sabesh-Murali pops in with their theme song; at others, you're reminded very strongly of the sentimental sagas of the 60s, when every character had miles of dialogue to cover and spoke reams about love, loyalty, duty and country". Chennai Online wrote, "The film has a decent storyline and a competent screenplay. All the directors, who have donned the 10 important characters, have got adequate scope to prove their mettle". The critic added, "While we could appreciate the honest attempt by Madhuravan, we have to say that the plot and the script could have been lot more gripping". S. R. Ashok Kumar of The Hindu wrote, "With so many characters, the screenplay and the dialogue (both by the director) are bound to meander and they do but the director quickly takes command of the situation. Camera is handled in an efficient way by Balabarani. But where was he during colour correction?" Sify wrote, "On the whole, this family drama tests the patience of the audience and it's difficult to connect with the characters and their circumstances".

== Future ==
In January 2024, a sequel was reported to be in development, with K. P. Jagannath directing and the majority of the cast returning.
