= Goodness Gracious Me =

Goodness gracious me is an interjection expressing surprise. It may also refer to:

- "Goodness Gracious Me" (song), comic song recorded by Peter Sellers & Sophia Loren
- Goodness Gracious Me (TV series), a British radio and then television sketch comedy series that was broadcast on BBC

== See also ==
- Goodness Gracious (disambiguation)
