= Rasu Madhuravan =

Indian film director

- Born: Karuppiah; 1969; Mettupatti, Dindigul district, Tamil Nadu
- Died: 9 July 2013 (aged 44); Chennai, Tamil Nadu, India
- Education: Agriculture graduate
- Occupations: director, screenwriter
- Years active: 1999–2012
- Spouse: Bhavani

Rasu Madhuravan (1969 – 9 July 2013) was a Tamil film director known for family dramas. He began his career as an assistant director to Manivannan, and made his directorial debut with Poomagal Oorvalam. He died on 9 July 2013 from throat cancer.

== Early life and career ==
Madhuravan was born as Karuppiah in a village called Mettupatti near Dindigul district in Tamil Nadu. He was a alumnus in Usilampatti Government School. While studying agriculture in college, he left studies, citing lack of interest, and went to Chennai in 1987.

Madhuravan joined as an assistant director with Manivannan and started his debut Manamagal Thevai with Jayaram and Devayani, but the film was dropped after recording songs. He was supposed to direct Ajith in a project called Namma Veettu Kalyanam, but that too was dropped. R. B. Choudary gave Madhuravan a chance to direct Poomagal Oorvalam. The film, starring Prashanth and Rambha, released in 1999 to average reviews, with a critic noting to "watch it for comedy". After the release, Madhuravan could not get enough opportunities and instead wrote comedy tracks for actor Vadivelu. He had started work on a project titled Ullam Thulluthe Thannale with Prashanth and Jyothika, but the film did not complete production.

After nine years, Madhuravan directed Pandi with Raghava Lawrence and Sneha in lead roles. The film received mixed reviews, with a critic from Behindwoods noting it as an "average entertainer". His third directorial was Mayandi Kudumbathar, where he cast 10 directors in the film. The film received positive reviews and did well at the box office. Madhuravan's next directorial, Goripalayam, was an action drama set in Madurai. The film received negative reviews, with critics comparing it with Subramaniapuram. The busy schedule of this film prompted Madhuravanm to reject a negative role in a film Konjam Veyil Konjam Mazhai, which his assistant Ekadasi, who directed this film, opted to play the role. Madhuravan's next directorial was Muthukku Muthaaga, another family drama which also received positive reviews and was an average grosser at box office.

Madhuravan then announced projects with director Cheran, Raghava Lawrence, and Parthom Pazhaginom with comedian Mayilsamy's son Anbu, but none of the projects took off. Instead, he announced his next project called Mikeset Pandi, which was changed as Pandi Oli Perukki Nilayam, which became a disaster at the box office. He was supposed to direct Sogusu Perundhu, but due to his untimely death, the project was stopped.

== Personal life and death ==
Madhuravan was married to Bhavani and had two daughters. He died at the age of 44 on 9 July 2013 due to throat cancer.

== Filmography ==
- Poomagal Oorvalam (1999)
- Pandi (2008)
- Mayandi Kudumbathar (2009)
- Goripalayam (2010)
- Muthukku Muthaaga (2011)
- Pandi Oli Perukki Nilayam (2012)
