= Khadak =

Khadak may refer to:

- Khadak (2006 film), Belgian/Dutch/German film directed by Peter Brosens
- Khadak (2022 film), an Indian Kannada-language crime action film
- Khadak, Nepal, municipality in Saptari District, Province No. 2, Nepal
- Khadak Malegaon, village in Nashik, Maharashtra, India

== See also ==
- Katar Khadak, a village in Mulshi taluka, Pune District, Maharashtra, India
- Kharak Singh, ruler of the Sikh Empire from 1839–1839
