= Apsara Rani =

Indian actress (born 1996)

- Born: Anketa Maharana; 12 January 1996 (age 30); Dehradun, Uttaranchal, India
- Occupations: Actress; model
- Years active: 2019–present
- Notable work: Dangerous

Anketa Maharana (born 12 January 1996), credited professionally as Apsara Rani, is an Indian actress who appears primarily in Telugu films.

== Career ==
Anketa made her acting debut with R. Raghuraj's romantic drama 4 Letters. Her next film role was in the Satya Prakash directed romantic horror Oollalla Oollalla in 2020. Along with Nataraj and Noorin Shereef. The film was released on 1 January 2020 and received negative reviews upon its release and was declared a flop at the box office. The following year, she appeared opposite newcomer Rock Kacchi in Thriller, a romantic thriller from the director Ram Gopal Varma. It was on Ram Gopal Varma's insistence that Anketa changed her name to Apsara Rani. Due to the COVID-19 pandemic, the film was released on Shreyas ET App on 14 August 2020, and received negative reviews from the audience and critics.

In 2021, Apsara returned to Telugu Cinema with a special appearance in Gopichand Malineni's thriller mystery Krack starring Ravi Teja and Shruti Haasan.She appeared as an item girl in the song "Bhoom Bhaddhal". Apsara has also appeared as an item girl in the song "Pepsi Aunty" from the film Seetimaarr.

She was next cast in Ram Gopal Varma's Dangerous, India's first lesbian crime action film along with Naina Ganguly. She has also committed to essay the female lead opposite bilingual film Patnagarh, made in Odia and Telugu languages, based on the Patnagarh bombing. Additionally, Apsara is reuniting with Ram Gopal Varma's D Company as an item girl in film.

== Filmography ==
Key
†	Denotes films that have not yet been released

Year	Title	Role	Language	Notes	Ref.
2019	4 Letters	Anupama	Telugu	Debut film	
2020	Oollalla Oollalla	Trisha	Telugu		
2020	Thriller	Meghana	Telugu	Short film	
2021	Krack		Telugu	Special appearance in the song "Bhoom Bhaddhal"	
2021	D Company		Hindi	Special appearance in the song "Khatham"	
2021	Seetimaarr		Telugu	Special appearance in the song "Pepsi Aunty"	
2022	Dangerous		Hindi		
2023	Hunt		Telugu	Special appearance in the song "Papa tho Pailam"	
2024	Thalakona		Telugu		
2025	Racharikam	Bhargavi Reddy	Telugu		
2026	Blood Roses	Adhira	Telugu		
