= Narathan =

2016 Indian film by Naga Venkat

- Theatrical poster
- Directed by: Naga Venkatesh
- Produced by: Sajith V Nambiar
- Starring: Nakul; Premji; Nikesha Patel; Shruti Ramakrishnan
- Cinematography: Sanjay Loknath
- Edited by: Shyjith Kumaran
- Music by: Mani Sharma
- Production companies: Vetrivel Film International; The Principal India; Kashsh Movies
- Release date: 1 April 2016
- Country: India
- Language: Tamil

Narathan (transl. Mischief Maker) is 2016 Indian Tamil-language romantic comedy film produced by Sajith V Nambiar, The Principal India and directed by Naga Venkat Nakul, Nikesha Patel, Premji (as the title character) and Shruti Ramakrishnan star in it, while Mani Sharma composed the film's music. The film was released on 1 April 2016.

== Plot ==
Vishnu (Nakul) travels from Coimbatore to Chennai to begin a new job and meet his fiancée, who is also his cousin. During the journey, he meets Pavitra (Nikesha Patel). After arriving in Chennai, Vishnu becomes involved in a series of unexpected events. At the same time, Narathan (Premgi Amaren), a film director, stays with his uncle, a film producer. Narathan narrates a story to Vishnu's uncle, and the events in the story begin to resemble those occurring in Vishnu's life.

== Cast ==
- Nakul as Vishnu
- Premgi Amaren as Narathan
- Nikesha Patel as Maya/Swetha
- Shruti Ramakrishnan as Sowmya
- Radha Ravi as Anbazhagan
- M. S. Bhaskar as Bhaskar
- Nizhalgal Ravi as Vishnu's father
- Powerstar Srinivasan as Powerkumar
- Mayilsamy as Narathan's assistant
- Vaiyapuri as Baskar's assistant
- Subbu Panchu as Principal
- Ashvin Raja as Pazham
- Pandu as Astrologer
- Chetan as Auto Driver
- Scissor Manohar
- Kavitha as Kamala
- Jangiri Madhumitha as Swapna
- Meera Krishnan as Vishnu's mother
- Raani
- Srilaksmi
- Neha Menon
- Cool Suresh
- Vishwa in a guest appearance
- Zoya Shaikh in a cameo appearance in "My Name is Chandrika" song
- Ashmitha in a cameo appearance in "My Name is Chandrika" song

== Production ==
Narathan produced by Sajith Venugopalan Nambiar was launched in the presence of the Governor of Tamil Nadu Konijeti Rosaiah in April 2013, with Nakul and Santhanam signed up to play the lead roles. Santhanam's subsequent busy schedule meant that he was later replaced by Premgi Amaren in the role.

The film's cast became a subject of media confusion, when several actresses reportedly claimed that they were set to play the lead role in the film. Nikesha Patel had signed the film and began filming, having committed to her third Tamil film in as many months. She had previously been expected to work with Nakul in K. S. Adhiyaman's Amali Thumali, but had opted out. Bangalore model Deeptii Mohan revealed she was signed on as one of the two heroines, thus marking her debut in Tamil films with the venture. Then Harshika Poonacha reported that she was to play the lead role in the film, noting that she was to feature in songs and scenes opposite Nakul, and suggested that Nikesha could be the film's second lead female actress. Furthermore, Shruthi Ramakrishnan revealed she signed the film to play Nakul's girlfriend, while another actor Shravanth Rao also claimed he was to play Nikesha Patel's pair in the film. The director, Naga Venkatesh, came forward to clarify that Nikesha Patel was the heroine of the film, while Sonu would play a second leading female role. He further noted that Deeptii Mohan would play a pivotal supporting character, contrary to her reports that she would play heroine and that Sharvanth Rao was signed for a different film.

== Soundtrack ==
Soundtrack was composed by Mani Sharma.

No.	Song	Singers	Lyrics	notes
1	"Mayakkara Manmadha"	Ramya NSK, Karthik	Thiraivannan	
2	"Mayakkara Manmadha" (Remix)	Ramya NSK, Karthik	Thiraivannan	
3	"My Name Is Chandhrika"	Suchitra, Senthildass Velayutham, Narendhran	Viveka	
4	"Saaral Veesum"	Haricharan, Rita Thyagarajan	Viveka	Based on "Evaru Lerani" from Ek Niranjan
5	"Thada Thada"	Gana Selvam, Mukesh Mohamed, Priyadarshini	Sorikko	

== Critical reception ==
Times of India wrote "The premise isn't without potential, but it needs a script that is water-tight and a director who knows how to execute it. Sadly, Naga Venkatesh's script is childish, and his direction haphazard that we start fidgeting barely moments into the film."
