= Punith Arsikere =

Punith Arsikere (born Purushottam U. on February 13, 1993) is a Kannada film director and screenwriter predominantly working in Kannada cinema. He is known for directing the mystery thrillers Amaravathi Police Station and John.

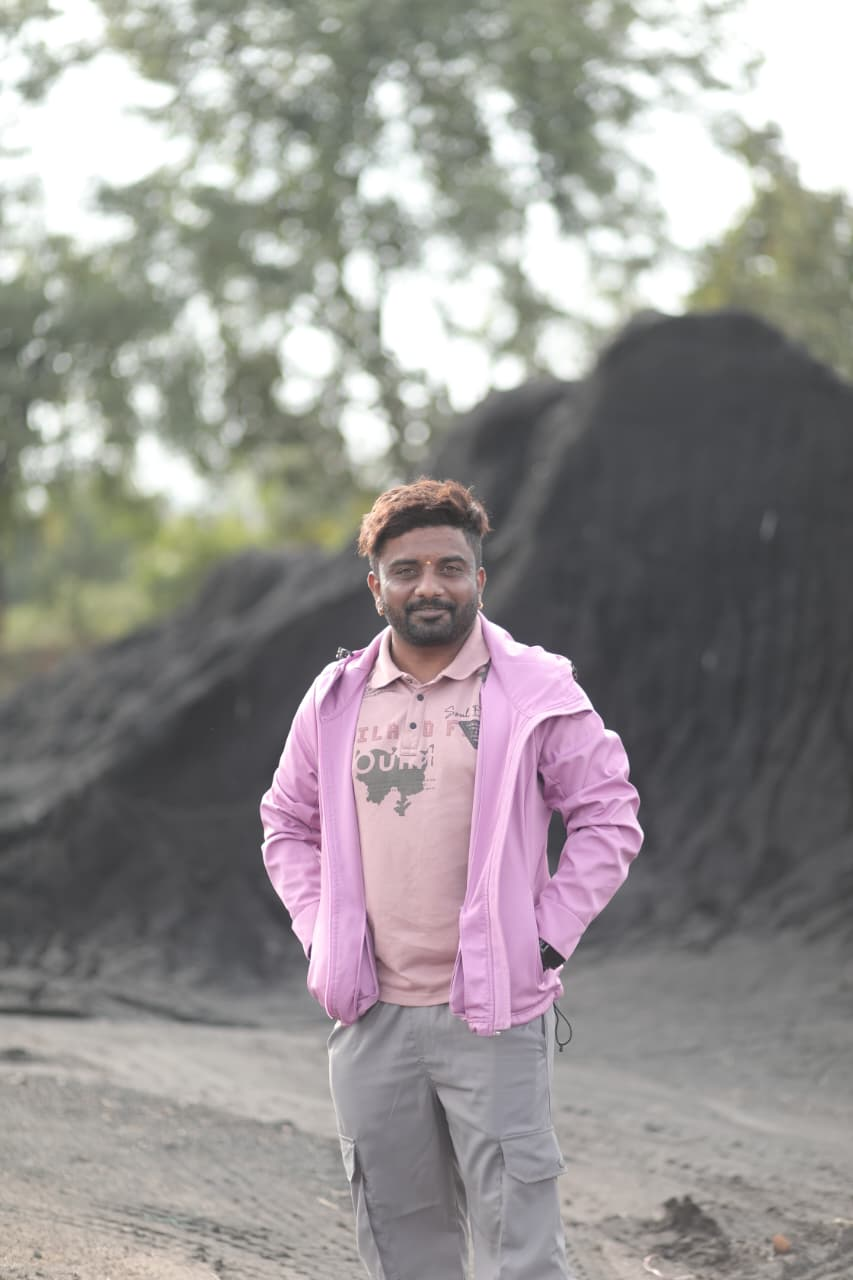
Punith Arsikere: Born / Purushottam U; Date / February 13, 1993 (age 33); Place / Arsikere, Hassan, Karnataka; Parents / Uday Kumar; Bhagyamma

== Career ==
Punith made his directorial and writing debut with the suspense thriller film Amaravathi Police Station. Produced by K.R. Pradeep Kamalapura, the movie features a notable ensemble cast, including Dharma Keerthiraj, Gururaj Jaggesh, Sadhu Kokila, Vedvika, Ramesh Bhat, Anant Velu, and Malvika Avinash. The film has completed shooting and is currently in the post-production phase, with a release planned for late March or April. While his debut film Amaravathi Police Station was in post-production, Punith began work on his second directorial venture, a mystery thriller titled John produced under the Yuva Power Pictures banner. The lead cast includes Dharma Keerthiraj. Punith Arsikere is also associated with a film titled Dhool Dhamaka.
