= Namaste Madam =

- Theatrical release poster
- Directed by: R. Raghuraj
- Screenplay by: Sairam; Vinayakaram Kalagaru; Harshapriya; Dev; R. Raghuraj
- Dialogues by: Vinayakaram Kalagar; Sairam
- Story by: S. Neelakanta
- Based on: Missamma by S. Neelakanta
- Produced by: Ravi Garani
- Starring: Srinagar Kitty; Nikesha Patel; Ragini Dwivedi
- Cinematography: Santhosh Rai Pathaje
- Edited by: Kiran Kumar K. L.
- Music by: Sridhar V. Sambhram
- Production companies: RG Pictures; MNK Movies
- Release date: 23 October 2014
- Running time: 139 minutes
- Country: India
- Language: Kannada

Namaste Madam (transl. Greetings Madam) is a 2014 Indian Kannada-language comedy drama film directed by R. Raghuraj and produced by Ravi Garani. The film features Srinagar Kitty, Nikesha Patel and Ragini Dwivedi in the lead roles. Actress Nikita Thukral made a cameo appearance.

The film is a remake of Telugu film Missamma (2003) directed by G. Neelakanta Reddy and starring Sivaji, Laya and Bhoomika Chawla. The film opened as a Diwali festival release on 23 October 2014.

== Plot ==
Nanda is a married man who tries to impress Radhika, the MD of their company, to get a promotion. However, he realises that his job is not as easy as it looks because Radhika plans to marry him.

== Cast ==
- Srinagar Kitty as Nanda Gopala
- Nikesha Patel as Rukmini
- Ragini Dwivedi as Radhika
- Sadhu Kokila
- Nikita Thukral in guest appearance
- Seetha
- Bank Janardhan
- Shanoor Sana
- Mahesh Gandhi
- Sathyajith
- Sangamesh
- Shankar Rao
- Srinath Vasishta
- Malathesh
- Nagaraj Murthy
- Layendra

== Production ==
The female lead role was first reported as Priyamani who apparently rejected and later Ragini Dwivedi was signed for the same. The film had its controversy with actress Nikesha Patel refusing to promote the film citing that she had been sidelined and was not invited for the film's press conference meet. Also there was reports that she was upset with actress Ragini for sidelining her.

== Soundtrack ==
Namaste Madam

Soundtrack album by Sridhar V. Sambhram
- Genre: Feature film soundtrack
- Label: Lahari Music

The soundtrack for the film is composed by Sridhar V. Sambhram and consists of five tracks.

Tracklist
No.	Title	Lyrics	Singer(s)	Length
1.	"Panchendriyagala"	Sridhar V. Sambhram	Shashank
2.	"Ding Dong Bell"	V. Nagendra Prasad	Rajesh Krishnan, Supriya Lohith
3.	"Drankunaka Baatala"	V. Nagendra Prasad	Sangeetha Ravindran
4.	"Kannu Kaadutthide"	Hrudaya-Shiva	Shashank Sheshagiri, Shwetha
5.	"Beetrootu"	Kaviraj	Raj Guru, Sunitha Murali, Supriya Lohith

== Release ==
=== Critical reception ===
A critic from The Times of India wrote that "An absolute family entertainer, this one is meant for the masses".
