= Boss (2011 film) =

- Poster
- Directed by: R. Raghuraj
- Written by: R. Raghuraj
- Produced by: Ramesh Yadav
- Starring: Darshan; Navya Nair; Prabhu; Rekha Vedavyas
- Cinematography: A. V. Krishna Kumar
- Edited by: P. R. Soundar Raj
- Music by: V. Harikrishna
- Production company: Ramesh Yadav Movies
- Release date: 14 January 2011
- Running time: 144 minutes
- Country: India
- Language: Kannada

Boss is a 2011 Indian Kannada-language action drama film directed by R. Raghuraj. Darshan and Navya Nair are the lead pair of the film. V. Harikrishna has composed the music for the film. This film also features Tamil actor Prabhu playing the role of a CBI officer, named after the role played by Mammootty in CBI-franchise.

== Plot ==
Ram and Raj are twin brothers, who are opposite of each other. Ram is a money-minded and cowardly millionaire while Raj is an intelligent, brave, and selfless young man. Though Raj worships his brother, Ram considers the former an outcast and uses him only when required. Meanwhile, Raj meets Rani, who falls in love with him. One day, Raj is falsely accused of murdering Sub-Inspector Mallayya, whom he had earlier thrashed, and is jailed where he is planned to be murdered by a gangster. However, Raj manages to escape to meet his brother and prove his innocence only to find that the latter has been murdered in his farmhouse. After secretly cremating Ram, Raj returns to the city as Ram to prove his innocence and find his brother's killer. As he begins his investigation he is confronted by CBI officer Sethurama Iyer. Sethurama Iyer is tasked with finding Raj where he interrogates Ram (Raj). Sethuram Iyer reveals that he suspects some foul play. To clear his doubts he hires a Private Investigator to keep an eye on Raj and goes to the extent of brutally torturing Raj's friend Kumara and others to prove that the person, who masqueraded as Ram is Raj.

While trying to convince the officer, Raj starts to receive mysterious calls from Venkatappa, an anonymous employee of Ram who claims to know the real identity of Raj and threatens to expose his identity, if he continues his drama as Ram. After a cat-mouse game between Sethurama Iyer and Raj where Raj outsmarts him. Raj arrives at a factory with Ram's PA Sona where the mysterious caller is revealed to be Nanda, who was working at Ram's office as a waiter. Sona reveals that she loves Ram more than the world, but Ram misunderstands Sona and humiliates her. Due to this, Sona plans to seek vengeance on Ram and learns Raj's masquerade as Ram and blackmails Raj into marrying her for money, but Nanda shoots Sona in the head kills her and reveals that Ram is responsible for his family's death and had planned to kill him to seek over business and vengeance. So, he plans with Venkatappa to finish Ram with Sona's help, but Venkatappa disagrees and has him killed and creates a fake Venkatappa to take over the business, but is spoiled due to Raj's interference.

Nanda tries to kill Raj, but Raj subdues him and reveals that he already suspected Sona as she told a fake story and was waiting for the caller to arrive. A fight ensues where Raj subdues the henchman and kills Nanda. The next day, Sethuram Iyer arrives at Ram's office to arrest him where Sethuram Iyer reveals that Ram is a business freak, who killed 6 businessmen to rise in business and was the one who killed Sub-Inspector Mallayya when he humiliated him and placed the blame on Raj. Raj, realizing that his brother is a killer takes the blame and is sentenced to 3 years in prison. Rani and Raj's mother arrive and learn about Raj's masquerade and feel bad for Raj, taking the blame for Ram's crimes. Sethuram Iyer confronts Raj, who has escaped from prison where he tells Sethuram Iyer about his plan to surrender to the police, to be with his mother and Rani.

== Cast ==
- Darshan as Ram and Raj
- Navya Nair as Rani
- Prabhu as Sethurama Iyer CBI
- Rekha Vedavyas as Sonu
- Umashri as Lakshmi
- Sumithra as Ram and Raj's mother
- Rangayana Raghu as Nandu
- Bullet Prakash as Kumara
- Killer Venkatesh as Inspector Mallayya
- Supreeth as Chotta Bhai
- Lambu Nagesh

== Soundtrack ==
Boss
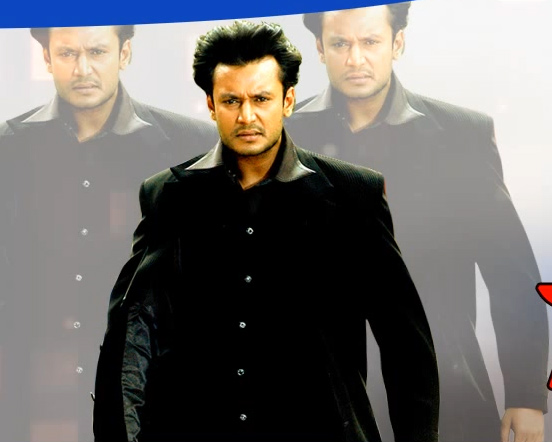

Soundtrack album by V. Harikrishna
- Released: 2011
- Recorded: 2011
- Genre: Feature film soundtrack
- Length: 23:50
- Language: Kannada

Official audio
- Boss - Full Album on YouTube

Track listing
| No. | Title | Singer(s) | Length |
|---|---|---|---|
| 1. | "Rajkumar" | Vijay Prakash | 4:40 |
| 2. | "Naanu Zoom" | Krishnam Raju, Nanditha | 5:36 |
| 3. | "Jaane Janeman" | Udit Narayan, Anuradha Sriram | 4:34 |
| 4. | "Lavanya Ninna Sarasava" | Megha | 5:25 |
| 5. | "Muttatheeni Thattatheeni" | Shamitha Malnad | 4:15 |
| Total length: | | | 23:50 |

== Reception ==
=== Critical response ===
Shruti Indira Lakshminarayana from Rediff.com scored the film at 2.5 out of 5 stars and says "Tamil actor Prabhu debuts in Kannada films with Boss. He plays a CBI officer and makes an entry only in the second half. An actor of his caliber is wasted and this role could have been played by anyone. Umashree and Bullet Prakash are also part of the cast. Boss is a festive outing for Darshan fans. While the actor is yet to please the class, he is surely the boss of the masses!". B S Srivani from Deccan Herald wrote "Prabhu fills up the screen along with Darshan with nothing much to do. Rekha, who’s improved a lot, gets a raw deal as well as Navya Nair. Harikrishna and Krishnakumar prove efficient workers. The highlight, if it can be called that, are the fights culminating in yet another ‘ode’ to The Matrix makers. This Boss must work hard to command attention". Sunayana Suresh from DNA wrote "Darshan has excelled in this tailor-made script. The two heroines play their parts well. Rangayana Raghu’s role entertains with its multiple shades. The music deserves a special mention, especially the title track, Classigu Massigu Boss, is very catchy. Watch this one and be entertained".
