= Om 3D =

- Movie poster
- Directed by: Sunil Reddy
- Written by: Sunil Reddy
- Produced by: Nandamuri Taraka Advitha; Nandamuri Kalyan Ram
- Starring: Nandamuri Kalyan Ram; Karthik; Kriti Kharbanda; Nikesha Patel
- Cinematography: Ajayan Vincent
- Edited by: Gautham Raju
- Music by: Achu Rajamani; Sai Karthik
- Release date: 19 July 2013
- Running time: 108 mins
- Country: India
- Language: Telugu

Om 3D is a 2013 Indian Telugu-language action thriller film written and directed by debutant Sunil Reddy. The film stars Nandamuri Kalyan Ram, Karthik and Sampath Raj in the lead roles, alongside Kriti Kharbanda and Nikesha Patel. The soundtrack was composed by Achu Rajamani and Sai Karthik.

The film is touted to be the first Indian action film in 3D and had been shot in 5K resolution. Hollywood technicians such as David Taylor, who worked for Avatar and Final Destination 5, and Ian Markus, known for The Amazing Spider-Man, have also worked for this film. The shooting was completed in 110 days, but the post production took another year.

Om 3D was theatrically released in 2D and 3D formats on 19 July 2013 and received mixed reviews from critics and became a box-office bomb.

== Plot ==
Arjun is the son of Harischandra Prasad who saves his father from an attack orchestrated by a minister named Byrreddy. Enraged, Byrreddy hires a recently released convict named Bhavani to finish Harishchandra Prasad. Arjun meets a girl named Anjali and they fall in love with each other. After dropping Anjali at the railway station, Arjun is attacked by Bhavani and his goons, but is rescued by his uncle Lakshman. Harischandra reveals that Bhavani was adopted by his father Vishnu Prasad, but he betrayed him by doing arms trafficking, following which his father got him arrested. Bhavani killed his father and Harischandra gets him arrested.

Meanwhile, Arjun's marriage is fixed with Harischandra's brother Ajay's daughter Riya. On the day of Holi, Arjun invites Anjali to meet his parents, but she leaves upon listening about his marriage. Ajay is killed by Bhavani's henchman, which prompts Arjun to fight Byreddy's goons and make him arrange for a meeting with Bhavani. They meet at a railway crossing and Bhavani is found holding Anjali hostage, where Arjun learns that Anjali had been sent undercover by Bhavani. In front of Bhavani, Anjali confesses her love for Arjun. Harischandra tells Riya to get closer to Arjun. Lakshman is revealed to be embroiled in the illegal arms trafficking. Bhavani decides to tell Arjun about Harischandra's involvement in arms trafficking. Anjali meets Arjun and apologizes, where she confesses her love for him.

Arjun realizes her true emotions and convinces Harischandra of their marriage. It is later revealed that Lakshman is embroiled in the illegal arms trafficking and had introduced Riya to trap Arjun. Riya gives a lift to Anjali where she reveals her intentions and gets her injured in a car accident. Anjali is admitted to the hospital, where Byreddy tells Arjun that it was Bhavani who got her attacked. Lakshman and Harischandra convince Arjun to kill Bhavani, following which he attacks his goons but is knocked unconscious. A car chase ensues between Lakshman and Bhavani. Upon gaining consciousness, Arjun manages to crash the car on a bridge, but is rescued by Bhavani, who then reveals that he is his father and not Harischandra, who has lied to him about everything.

It is also revealed that Bhavani never tried to attack Arjun and did not even told Anjali about Arjun being his son. Consumed by the thirst for wealth, Harischandra killed Vishnu Prasad and Arjun's mother, where Bhavani got framed for crimes. Bhavani runs towards Lakshman and his men with a bomb, causing everyone's death in an explosion. Arjun is rescued by Bhavani's brother Kaali who reveals that Vishnu Prasad's three sons: Harischandra, Ajay and Lakshman were jealous of Bhavani, due to which they framed and imprisoned Bhavani. They also killed Vishnu Prasad and Arjun's mother. Upon returning from prison, Bhavani was forced to take the blame for their crimes in order to save Arjun and Harischandra raised Arjun as his own son.

Realizing the truth, Arjun decides to exact revenge, where he contacts Riya and tells her to meet him in the mountains outside the city. Arjun finishes henchmen and kills Riya by shooting in her head. Learning that Arjun is alive, Byrreddy tries to escape along with his goons, but Arjun kills him in a car chase. Later, Harischandra holds Kaali hostage at a warehouse, where Arjun arrives, and a shootout ensues, resulting in Harischandra's death.

== Cast ==
- Nandamuri Kalyan Ram as Arjun
- Kriti Kharbanda as Anjali
- Nikesha Patel as Riya
- Karthik as Harischandra Prasad
- Rao Ramesh as Byrreddy
- Sampath Raj as Bhavani
- Sithara as Jyothi
- Suresh as Lakshman
- Ahuti Prasad as Ajay
- Raghu Karumanchi as Chandu
- Vijay Sai as Arjun's friend
- Surya as Bhavani's right-hand man
- Anitha Chowdhary as Arjun's mother

== Soundtrack ==
Achu and Sai Karthik composed three and two songs, respectively, with Achu's work being praised. The audio was released by Mayuri Audio.

OM 3D

Soundtrack album by Achu Rajamani, Sai Karthik
- Released: 2013
- Recorded: 2013
- Genre: Soundtrack
- Length: 19:28
- Label: Mayuri Audio
- Producers: Achu Rajamani; Sai Karthik

Track list
No.	Title	Lyrics	Music	Singer(s)	Length
1.	"Promo Song"	B. Subbaraya Sharma	Sai Karthik	Baba Sehgal	2:47
2.	"Cheliya"	Sirivennela Seetharama Sastry	Achu	Achu, Ramya NSK	3:36
3.	"Right Now"	Ramajogayya Sastry	Sai Karthik	Baba Sehgal, Bindhu Mahima	3:03
4.	"Holi Holi"	Kedarnath	Achu	Ranjith, Priya Himesh, Sharmila	3:33
5.	"Endukila"	Balaji	Achu	Haricharan, Chinmayi	04:05
6.	"Om Theme"		Sai Karthik	Instrumental	02:24
Total length:					19:28

== Reception ==
Jeevi of idlebrain gave 3 out of 5 stars and wrote "one should pat the back of Kalyan Ram for making Om 3D film with uncompromising passion and first-class 3D technology!!".
