= Nakkhul =

Indian actor and playback singer (born 1984)

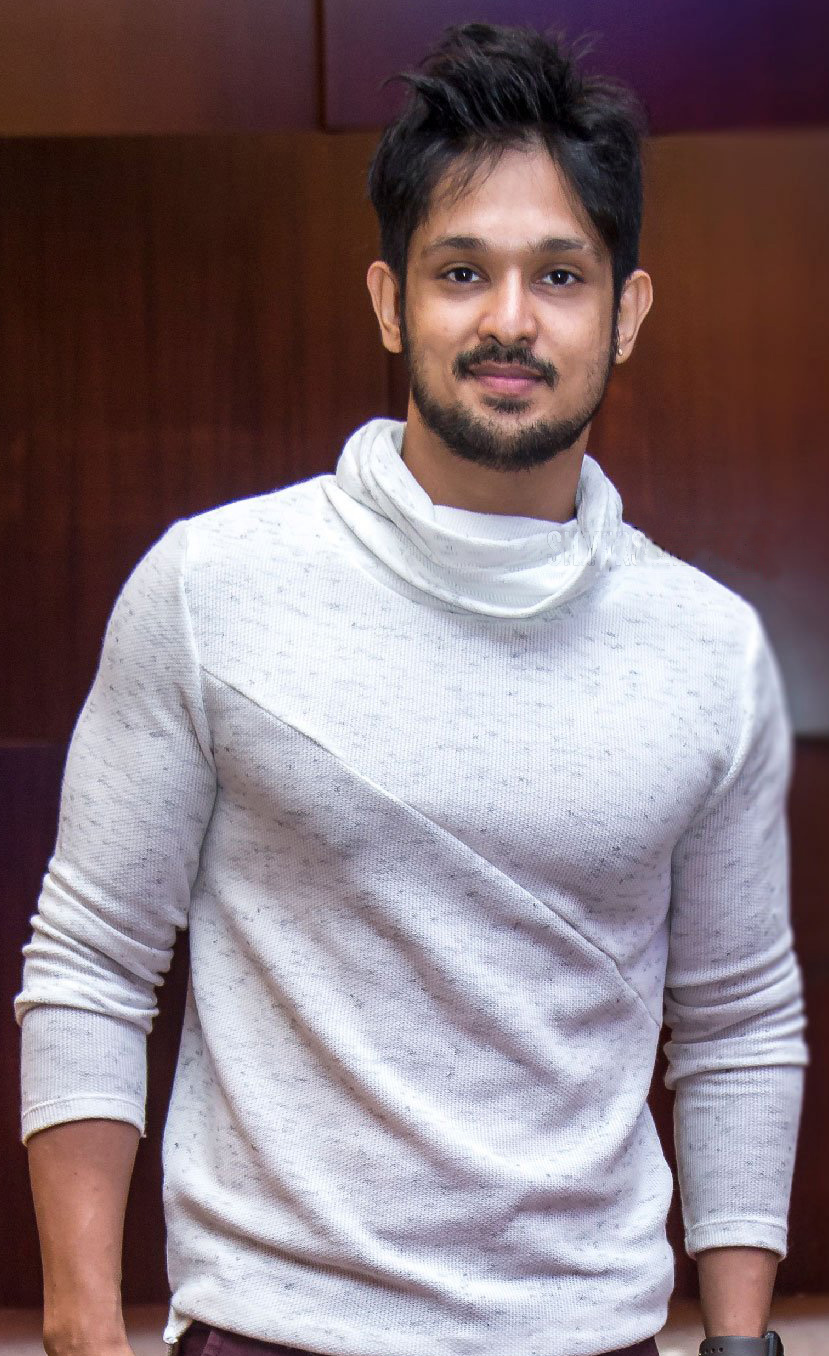
- Nakul at the Madras Couture Fashion Week
- Born: Nakkhul Jaidev Betarrbet; 15 June 1984 (age 42); Borivali, Mumbai, Maharashtra, India
- Other name: Nakul
- Occupations: Actor; Playback singer
- Years active: 2003–present
- Spouse: Sruti Bhaskar
- Children: 2
- Relatives: Devayani (sister)

Nakkhul Jaidev Betarrbet is an Indian actor and playback singer who works in Tamil cinema. He debuted as one of the lead actors in the 2003 film Boys directed by S. Shankar. He sang his first song in the soundtrack album for Anniyan (2005).

== Career ==
Nakkhul was 19 years old when he was chosen for the part of Juju in Shankar's coming-of-age film Boys (2003). His family had initially sent some pictures of his elder brother Mayur to Shankar's office, but after seeing Nakkhul in one of the pictures, Shankar approached him to portray a leading role alongside an ensemble cast of newcomers. The film opened in August 2003 to mixed reviews but the high-profile nature of the technical team ensured that the film was publicized and took a good opening at the box office. He then subsequently did a Telugu language film titled Keelu Gurram, in which he played a supporting role, which didn’t do well at the box office. He struggled to get a breakthrough as an actor and during the period, he worked as a playback singer in films, notably recording for Harris Jayaraj in his albums for Anniyan, Ghajini and Vettaiyaadu Vilaiyaadu.

He signed on to feature in Prasad's Kadhalil Vizhunthen, his first film as a lead actor, in 2007 and lost close to 20 kilograms in order to fit into the role of his character. Nakkhul revealed that the director and himself were wary that the film would define their careers in the film industry, and shot on a trial-and-error basis and were not in a hurry to complete the film, with production taking almost two years. The film gained unexpected publicity after "Nakka Mukka", a song composed by Vijay Antony for the soundtrack, became a big success and the venture was consequently selected by media giants Sun Pictures to become their first project for film distribution. Portraying a semi-psychotic character who refuses to accept the death of his lover, the film saw Nakkhul paired alongside actress Sunaina. The film released in 2008 and became a commercial hit, with critics raving and praising his performance stating "Nakul is riveting" and that "he holds the film together and dances with élan, and has a good future." Sun Pictures also chose to distribute his next venture, the romantic comedy Maasilamani (2009) opposite Sunaina again, with the film becoming a surprise huge box office success. He next featured in AGS Entertainment's Kandhakottai with Poorna, which opened to average response critically and commercially.

Nakkhul subsequently went four years without a film release, though he continued to work on several ventures simultaneously. In an interview, he stated that he preferred quality over quantity of work. Prithvi Rajkumar's thriller drama film Naan Rajavaga Pogiren released in 2013 to mixed reviews." His next release, Vallinam (2014), had been in production since mid 2011 and featured Nakkhul as a basketball player. To prepare for the role, Nakkhul underwent special training to "ensure that he lived the role rather than act". The film opened to positive reviews, with a critic noting "Nakul gives his career's best performance. He proves that a hero can step out of the commercial zone and take up roles that can still be liked by audience." He went on next be seen in Naga Venkatesh's Narathan, while K. S. Adhiyaman's long-delayed venture Amali Thumali, in which Nakkhul co-stars with Shanthanu Bhagyaraj, Santhanam, Swathi Reddy and Nikesha Patel, was also expected to be completed in 2014. In 2015, his Tamizhuku En Ondrai Azhuthavum released which turned out to be good reviews. He then went on to act in Brahma.com (2017). Though the movie received very mixed reviews. Sei (2018), in which he plays a role of an aspiring actor Saravedi Saravanan which was a failure at the box office. His film Vasco Da Gama, which has been in production for a long time, will finally be released in theaters on 2 August 2024. He starred in Kadhal Kadhai Sollava (2026) speaking love stories of characters.

== Personal life ==
Nakkhul was born in Mumbai, Maharashtra to Jaidev and Lakshmi. He was born to a Konkani father from Mangalore and a Malayali mother. His elder sister is actress Devayani. His elder brother, Mayur, has also attempted to make a career as an actor, though several of his films have been stalled prior to completion. He is married to his long-time girlfriend Sruti Bhaskar since 28 February 2016. His wife and him are known for singing together and making videos on their Instagram handles which receive a response among his fans. They are also known for being animal lovers and own many cats and dogs. They have been advocates for Indian dogs and post many cute pictures and videos. They have a daughter who was born in August 2020 and a son who was born in June 2022.

== Filmography ==
Key
†	Denotes films that have not yet been released

=== As an actor ===
List of films and roles
Year	Title	Role	Notes	Ref.
2003	Boys	Juju		
2005	Keelu Gurram	Bala Bheema	Telugu film	
2008	Kadhalil Vizhunthen	Sabapathy		
2009	Maasilamani	Maasilamani		
2009	Kandhakottai	Siva		
2013	Naan Rajavaga Pogiren	Raja / Jeeva		
2014	Vallinam	Krishna		
2015	Tamizhuku En Ondrai Azhuthavum	Vasanth		
2016	Narathan	Vishnu		
2017	Brahma.com	Kameshwaran		
2018	Sei	Saravedi Saravanan		
2024	Vasco Da Gama	Vasudevan		
2026	Kadhal Kadhai Sollava	Naveen		

=== As a playback singer ===
List of songs
Year	Song	Album	Language	Composer
2005	"Kaadhal Yaanai"	Anniyan	Tamil	Harris Jayaraj
2005	"Love Elephantla"	Aparichitudu (D)	Telugu	Harris Jayaraj
2005	"Remo"	Aparichit (D)	Hindi	Harris Jayaraj
2005	"X-Machi"	Ghajini	Tamil	Harris Jayaraj
2005	"X-Pichi"	Ghajini (D)	Telugu	Harris Jayaraj
2006	"Manjal Veyil"	Vettaiyaadu Vilaiyaadu	Tamil	Harris Jayaraj
2006	"Karka Karka"	Vettaiyaadu Vilaiyaadu	Tamil	Harris Jayaraj
2006	"Pacha Velugu"	Raghavan (D)	Telugu	Harris Jayaraj
2006	"Katti Choosthe"	Raghavan (D)	Telugu	Harris Jayaraj
2006	"Hooray Hooray Hip"	Vallavan	Tamil	Yuvan Shankar Raja
2008	"Naakka Mukka"	Kadhalil Vizhunthen	Tamil	Vijay Antony
2009	"Eppadi Ennul Kaadhal"	Kandhakottai	Tamil	Dhina
2014	"Nakula"	Vallinam	Tamil	Thaman
2014	"Live The Moment"	Kathai Thiraikathai Vasanam Iyakkam	Tamil	Thaman

=== Television ===
List of television shows and roles
Year	Show	Role	Channel	Notes
2020	Dance Vs Dance	Judge	Colors Tamil	Television debut
2020	Super Singer Junior 7	Judge	Star Vijay	
2021	BB Jodigal	Judge	Star Vijay	
2021	Super Singer Junior 8	Judge	Star Vijay	
2022	Super Queen	Judge; Host	Zee Tamil	
