= Sakthi (1997 film) =

- Poster
- Directed by: R. Raghuraj
- Screenplay by: R. Raghuraj
- Story by: K. T. Kunjumon
- Produced by: K. T. Kunjumon
- Starring: Vineeth; Yuvarani
- Cinematography: Tirru
- Edited by: B. Lenin; V. T. Vijayan
- Music by: R. Anandh
- Production company: Gentleman Film International
- Release date: 10 January 1997
- Running time: 140 minutes
- Country: India
- Language: Tamil

Sakthi is a 1997 Indian Tamil-language action drama film directed by R. Raghuraj, making his directorial debut. The film stars Vineeth and Yuvarani, with Nizhalgal Ravi, Vadivelu, Manorama, Sivakumar, Viji, Radikaa and Vittal Rao playing supporting roles. Produced by K. T. Kunjumon, it was released on 10 January 1997, and failed at the box-office.

== Plot ==
In the past, the young Seethalakshmi became pregnant but she didn't reveal the father's identity. To punish her, the village chief Periya Ayya ordered her to live alone in a small hut and after the childbirth, he took her newborn son. Dharmaraj and Varalakshmi got married. Periya Ayya then sent the baby to another village.

Years later, Sakthi returns to his village and becomes the manager of the village's temple. Sakthi thinks he is an orphan. Afterwards, Sakthi and Raani fall in love with each other. Soon, Varalakshmi's brother Sethupathi tries to rob the temple's costly things. On his first attempt, Sethupathi's henchmen fail because of Sakthi. The second time, he robs the temple's kalasha. He then traps the innocent Sakthi and Periya Ayya dismisses him. Sakthi finally discovers his parents' identities: Dharmaraj and Seethalakshmi. What transpires later forms the crux of the story.

== Cast ==
- Vineeth as Sakthi
- Yuvarani as Raani
- Nizhalgal Ravi as Sethupathi
- Vadivelu as Irulandi
- Manorama as Velammal
- Sivakumar as Dharmaraj
- Viji as Varalakshmi
- Radikaa as Seethalakshmi
- Vittal Rao as Periya Ayya
- Periya Karuppu Thevar
- Mayilsamy
- King Kong
- Baby Jennifer as Devi
- Eswara Pandian
- Tirupur Ramasamy as Karuppu
- Kovai Senthil
- Chelladurai
- Jayamani

== Production ==
Sakthi is the directorial debut of Raghuraj. The film was prominently shot at Pollachi.

== Soundtrack ==
The soundtrack was composed by R. Anandh.

Song	Singer(s)	Lyrics	Duration
"Aaraaro Enbathu"	P. Unnikrishnan	Vairamuthu	3:03
"Achu Vellame"	Gopal Rao, Swarnalatha	Vairamuthu	5:08
"Manamadurai"	Mano, Swarnalatha	Vairamuthu	4:02
"Mutham Koduthal"	Mano, Annupamaa	Vairamuthu	4:48
"Sakthi Sakthi"	Kavita Krishnamurthy	Vaali	2:35
"Yaana Yaana"	Vadivelu	Vairamuthu	4:50
