= Varadhanayaka =

- Theatrical release poster
- Directed by: Ayyappa P. Sharma
- Story by: Ravi Kinagi
- Based on: Lakshyam (Telugu)(2007) by Sriwass
- Produced by: Shankar Gowda
- Starring: Sudeepa; Chiranjeevi Sarja; Sameera Reddy; Nikesha Patel; P. Ravi Shankar
- Cinematography: Rajesh Katta
- Edited by: Ishwar
- Music by: Arjun Janya
- Production company: Shankar Productions
- Release date: 25 January 2013
- Running time: 151 minutes
- Country: India
- Language: Kannada
- Box office: ₹ 13 crore

Varadhanayaka is a 2013 Indian Kannada-language action film directed by Ayyappa P. Sharma and stars Sudeepa, Chiranjeevi Sarja, Sameera Reddy and Nikesha Patel. The film marks the Kannada debut of Sameera Reddy. The movie is a remake of the 2007 Telugu movie Lakshyam. Arjun Janya is the music director of the film. Shankare Gowda has produced the venture under the Shankar Productions banner.

== Plot ==
In Bangalore, ACP Varadhanayaka lives happily with his parents, wife Lakshmi and younger brother Hari, a college student. A girl named Sirisha comes across Varadhanayaka when she is on a field trip from her college with her friends. She gets friendly with his daughter Pinky. It turns out that Hari studies in Sirisha's college and soon after they accidentally come to know each other.

Varadhanayaka investigates the case of a dreaded criminal, Section Shankar, who is involved in land dealings which are completely illegal, and others, with which the DIG is involved. When the chairman of the bank who has lent money for the deal demands for the money back as the deal hasn't worked, Shankar eliminates him. The people who are customers of the bank take to the streets and try to damage the bank.

Varadhanayaka arrives there and arrests the manager. Shankar discovers where the manager has been taken. He arrives with his men and the DIG and nearly kills ACP Varadhanayaka. Shankar asks his men to dump his body. On the way, Hari gets involved and ultimately rescues his brother from a burning bus and Varadhanayaka dies in Hari's arms.

The entire media and people assume that Varadhanayaka has swindled off all the money as they have been made to believe that by the DIG. Hari seeks vengeance on the people who killed Varadhanayaka; he kills Siddharth "Siddu" (his friend and Shankar's brother), and later kills the DIG. Shankar kidnaps Hari's entire family where Hari arrives and kills Shankar. He spills the beans that Varadhanayaka is dead and rescues his family under the supervision of the new DIG, who supports him wholeheartedly.

== Cast ==
- Sudeepa as Varadhanayaka
- Chiranjeevi Sarja as Hari, Varadhanayaka's younger brother
- Sameera Reddy as Lakshmi, Varadhanayaka's wife
- Nikesha Patel as Sirisha "Siri"
- P. Ravi Shankar as 'Section' Shankar, a mafia kingpin
- Dr Ambareesh as himself (Guest Appearance before the song "Baite Baite")
- Sumalatha Ambareesh as herself (Guest Appearance before the song "Baite Baite")
- Rockline Venkatesh as the new DIG (Guest Appearance)
- Mukhyamantri Chandru as Varadhanayaka and Hari's father
- Jai Jagadish as Siri's father
- Shobaraj as Shankar's sidekick
- Sharath Lohitashwa as DIG Rudresh Gowda
- J. Karthik as Siddharth "Siddhu", Hari's friend and Shankar's brother
- Sharan as Hari's friend
- Chitra Shenoy as Siri's mother
- Padmaja Rao as Varadhanayaka and Hari's mother
- Bullet Prakash as Canteen owner
- Dharma as Siri's cousin
- Sathyajith
- Rajiv

== Production ==
=== Casting ===
Shankare Gowda, the producer had initially cast Chiranjeevi Sarja to play the main protagonist played by Gopichand in the Telugu version. Later, to reprise the cop role played by Jagapathi Babu in the original version, Gowda approached Sudeepa, his main star in the previous venture Kempegowda. Owing to the success of their previous venture, Gowda decided to give extra screen time for Sudeepa in the new film. Gowda was in search of two leading female stars from the Kannada industry. However, due to date issues, none could be roped in. Actress Priyamani was approached to play the lead but she refused the offer. Finally in July 2011, Nikesha Patel who had just begun her career in Telugu films was cast opposite Sarja in the lead role. Later Kamalinee Mukherjee was approached to play the role opposite Sudeepa. However, she was dropped and later Bollywood actress Sameera Reddy was finally roped in for the role. Director Ayyappa Sharma's brothers Sai Kumar and P. Ravi Shankar was also roped in to play the supporting characters. It was also announced that Arjun Sarja would be doing a cameo appearance in the film.

=== Filming ===
As per the initial plans, the film was supposed to go on sets in February 2011. However several delays caused the shooting to regularly commence from 27 June 2011.The filming began without even casting the leading ladies for the film.

== Release ==
Initially, the film was plan to release on 23, November 2012. The film released in India on 25 January 2013 to mixed reviews. and also Kannada Sangha in Canada released this film in Canada on 28 April 2013

== Soundtrack ==
Varadhanayaka

Soundtrack album by Arjun Janya
- Released: 16 November 2012
- Genre: Feature film soundtrack
- Language: Kannada
- Label: A2 Music
- Producer: Arjun Janya

Arjun Janya chronology
Rambo (2012)	Varadhanayaka (2012)	Victory (2013)
External audio
- Official Audio Jukebox on YouTube

Arjun Janya had composed the soundtrack collaborating with Sudeepa for the second time after the success of their previous movie Kempe Gowda (2011). Lyrics were written by Kaviraj and A. P. Arjun.

No.	Title	Lyrics	Singer(s)	Length
1.	"Baite Baite"	Chethan Kumar	Arjun Janya, Anuradha Bhat	4:46
2.	"Yeno Kane"	A. P. Arjun	Vijay Prakash, Priya Himesh	4:01
3.	"Ondhsari"	Chandan Shetty	Arjun Janya, Anuradha Bhat	3:43
4.	"Morningu"	Chandan Shetty	Chandan Shetty, Suma Shastry	4:13
5.	"Theme"	V. Nagendra Prasad	P. Ravi Shankar	1:37

== Reception ==
=== Critical response ===
GS Kumar of The Times of India scored the film at 3.5 out of 5 stars and says "Chiranjeevi Sarja has done an excellent work in sentimental and action sequences. Sudeepa is at his best as a police officer. It is Ravishankar as rowdy who beats all with brilliant dialogue delivery and body language. Nikesha Patel impresses you as the girl next door. Sameera Reddy, Dharma, Sharath Lohithashwa, Mukhyamanthri Chandru, Sharan and Shobhraj have done justice to their roles. Music by Arjun Janya is a highlight of the movie. Cinematographer Rajesh Kata has done a marvellous job". Srikant Sriniwasa of Rediff.com scored the film at 3 out of 5 stars and says "Arjun Janya’s music is in tune with what the youngsters want to hear. Cinematography by Rajesh Kata is brilliant and Ravi Varma’s stunt sequences are superb. Varadanayaka is a mass entertainer that should be watched for Sudeepa". A critic from News18 India wrote "'Varadanayaka' is a must watch for Kiccha Sudeep's fans, but it will also prove enjoyable for those who like commercial revenge dramas with huge budgets". Shruti I. L. from DNA wrote "As for music, Baite baite... is the only song that will stay with you even after you leave the movie hall. So what’s our verdict? If you are a fan of commercial potboilers then Varadanayaka will make for an ideal weekend watch".

== Awards and nominations ==
3rd South Indian International Movie Awards :-

- Best Actor in a Negative Role - Nominated - P. Ravi Shankar
- Best Music Director - Nominated - Arjun Janya
- Best Playback Singer (Male) - Won - Arjun Janya for the song "Baite Baite"
