= Blood Roses (film) =

Indian Telugu-language crime thriller film

- Theatrical release poster
- Directed by: M Gururanjan (a.k.a MGR)
- Written by: MGR
- Produced by: Harish Kamarthi
- Starring: Dharma Keerthiraj; Apsara Rani
- Cinematography: Ogi Reddy Siva Kumar
- Edited by: Ravi Teja CH
- Music by: Peddapalli Rohit
- Production company: TBR Cine Creations
- Release date: 6 February 2026
- Country: India
- Language: Telugu

Blood Roses is a 2026 Indian Telugu-language crime thriller film written and directed by Mandati Guru Rajan (MGR). Produced by Harish Kamarthi under the TBR Cine Creations banner, the film stars Dharma Keerthiraj and Apsara Rani in lead roles, alongside Sreelu Prudhviraj and Killi Kranthi.

The film was released theatrically on 6 February 2026. The technical crew includes cinematographer Ogi Reddy Siva Kumar, editor Raviteja CH, and music composer Peddapalli Rohith.

== Plot ==
The story is set in Hyderabad, where two prominent political figures, Devi Das and Bajrangi Das, are vying to launch their sons into politics during the upcoming elections. Amidst this political climate, a series of brutal murders takes place in the city. Media reports link Devi Das's son, Madan, to the killings, leading Devi Das's supporters to believe this is a conspiracy orchestrated by Bajrangi Das to destroy Madan's political career.

Circle Inspector Arun Gogoi (Dharma Keerthi Raju) takes up the investigation with integrity but is suspended due to severe political pressure. As the case is on the verge of being transferred to the CBI, the Police Commissioner and Home Minister intervene to appoint a special officer named Adhira (Apsara Rani). The narrative follows Adhira's efforts to solve the mystery and identify the true killer behind the serial murders.

== Cast ==
- Dharma Keerthiraj as Circle Inspector Arun Gogoi
- Apsara Rani as Adhira
- Sreelu Prithviraj as Janani
- Kranti Killi as Martin
- Gharshana Srinivas
- Tarzan
- Rajendra
- Junior Relangi
- Jagadeeshwari
- Jabardasth GMR
- Manikumar
- Dhruva
- Anil
- Narendra
- Pragya
- Navitha,
- ETV Jeevan
- Mamatha Reddy
- Jyothi
- Acharyalu

== Production ==
Filming was conducted primarily in the Hyderabad area. The first look poster of the film was unveiled on the occasion of Maha Shivaratri. Prior to the release, the film's trailer was launched by actor Rajendra Prasad and received praise from actor Babu Mohan.

== Reception ==
The film received mixed reviews from critics.

The Hans India gave the film a rating of 3/5, stating that it delivers a strong message about women's empowerment and noting that the role of Adhira serves as a turning point in Apsara Rani's career.

Times Now Telugu rated the film 3/5, praising the screenplay and the action sequences featuring the lead actress.

Conversely, a review by Sakshi found the story to be somewhat routine and the narration slow at times, though it acknowledged that the film might appeal to fans of crime stories.
