= 4 Letters =

Indian romantic comedy film

- Directed by: R. Raghuraj
- Written by: R. Raghuraj
- Produced by: Dommaraju Hemalatha; Dommaraju Udayakumar
- Starring: Eswar; Tuya Chakraborthy; Anketa Maharana
- Cinematography: Chitti Babu K.
- Edited by: R. Raghuraj
- Music by: Bheems Ceciroleo
- Production company: Om Shri Chakra Creations
- Release date: 19 February 2019
- Country: India
- Language: Telugu

4 Letters is a 2019 Indian Telugu-language romantic comedy film written and directed by R. Raghuraj. The film stars newcomers Eswar, Tuya Chakraborthy and Anketa Maharana.

== Cast ==
- Eswar as Ajay
- Tuya Chakraborthy as Anjali
- Anketa Maharana as Anupama
- Suresh
- Kausalya
- Annapoorna
- Sudha
- Satya Krishnan
- Vidyullekha Raman
- Posani Krishna Murali
- Krishna Bhagavaan
- Gautam Raju
- Ananth
- Venu Yeldandi
- Mahesh Vitta

== Soundtrack ==
The music is composed by Bheems Ceciroleo. The lyrics are written by Suresh Upadhyaya. In a music review of the film, a reviewer wrote that the album was "atrocious".

- "Raaye Pilla" - Mounika Reddy
- "Title Song"
- "Undha Ledha" - Athidi Bhavaraju, Eswar Babu
- "Balamani" - Raghuram, Mounika Reddy
- "Raaye Pilla (DJ version)"
- "Title Song (DJ version)"

== Reception ==
A critic from Cinema Express wrote that "The film is called 4 Letters. And after watching it, there are four letters that come to mind. It’s one big steaming pile of ... yes, you guessed it". A critic from The Times of India wrote that "With an aimless plot laden with vulgar dialogues full of double entendre, 4 Letters is almost unbearable to watch, even if you're a fan of the genre. If you decide to watch the film, keep some aspirin handy".
