= Racharikam =

2025 Indian Telugu-language film by Suresh Lankalapalli

- Theatrical release poster
- Directed by: Suresh Lankalapalli
- Written by: Suresh Lankalapalli
- Produced by: Esshwar
- Starring: Vijay Shankar; Varun Sandesh; Apsara Rani
- Cinematography: Arya Sai Krishna
- Edited by: JP
- Music by: Vengi
- Production company: Chill Bross Entertainment
- Release date: 31 January 2025
- Running time: 135 minutes
- Country: India
- Language: Telugu

Racharikam is a 2025 Indian Telugu-language political drama film written and directed by Suresh Lankalapalli. The film features Vijay Shankar, Varun Sandesh and Apsara Rani in lead roles.

The film was released on 31 January 2025.

The film is set in Rachakonda in the 1980s, 'Racharikam' revolves around siblings Bhargavi and Vivek Reddy, who aspire to gain political dominance. Their journey intersects with Shiva, a passionate youth leader of the Mana Sakthi Party, who follows his mentor Kranthi, an RSF leader.

== Cast ==
- Vijay Shankar as Shiva
- Varun Sandesh as Vivek Reddy
- Apsara Rani as Bhargavi Reddy, Vivek Reddy's elder sister
- Vijay Ram Raju
- Esshwar as Kranthi
- Srikanth Iyengar as Raja Reddy; Bhargavi Reddy's father
- Hyper Aadi
- Satish Saripalli

== Music ==
Music of the film is composed by Vengi.

All music is composed by Vengi.

No.	Title	Lyrics	Singer(s)	Length
1.	"Yem Mayani"	Vengi	Haricharan	3:49
2.	"Tikku Tikku"	Penchal Das	Penchal Das, Mangli	3:30
3.	"Managala Swarupame"	Suresh Lankalapalli	Harshita Pasala	2:33
4.	"Maula Maula"	Ramajogayya Sastry	Rahul Sipligunj, Sai Veda Vagdevi	4:51
5.	"Nippuvi Ningi Egi"	Penchal Das	Harshitha Pasala	2:48

== Release and reception ==
Racharikam was originally scheduled to release on 1 February 2025, but was released a day ahead on 31 January 2025.

Suhas Sistu of The Hans India gave a rating of 3 out of 5, and wrote that "Racharikam is a well-crafted political thriller with strong performances and engaging storytelling". OTTPlay gave a mixed review saying that "while the performances are arresting, the predictable nature of the film is obvious".

=== Streaming rights ===
The streaming rights of this movie was given to Lionsgate Play and Amazon Prime Video on 11 April 2025.
