= Appavi =

- Film poster
- Directed by: R. Raghuraj
- Written by: R. Raghuraj
- Produced by: V. L. Dhandapani
- Starring: Gautham; Suhani Kalita
- Cinematography: E. Krishnasamy
- Edited by: V. T. Vijayan
- Music by: Joshua Sridhar
- Production company: Devi Visions Pvt ltd.
- Release date: 1 April 2011
- Country: India
- Language: Tamil

Appavi (transl. Innocent) is a 2011 Indian Tamil language vigilante film written and directed by R. Raghuraj and produced by V. L. Dhandapani. The film's stars include debutant Gautham and Suhani Kalita in the lead roles, while K. Bhagyaraj, Soori, Sriranjani, Mahadevan, and Manobala play supporting roles. The music was composed by Joshua Sridhar with cinematography by E. Krishnasamy and editing by V. T. Vijayan. The film released on 1 April 2011 after much delay.

== Plot ==
Bharathi (Gautham) is a refined college goer and a gem among his peers, while secretly, he is a daring vigilante who executes corrupt politicians, bureaucrats, terrorists, and anyone who harms the general public. Bharathi marks his crimes by recording his victim's confessions of wrongdoings in their mobile phones and circulating these as MMSs before executing them. A wannabe MLA with hidden wealth, a corrupt minister, and a terrorist are executed on camera, and their videos are circulated among the general public. The police are baffled, and corrupt politicians and bureaucrats fear for their lives. The common man celebrates the MMS killer, whose actions are an antidote for their resentment towards inefficient and corrupt government functionaries.

In his normal life, Bharathi tops in his academics and discipline, which makes him the heartthrob of his college mates. One of them Ramya (Suhani Kalita), the daughter of Susa (Mahadevan), falls for him and tries to woo him, but in vain. Susa is a very powerful politician, and as such, he moves ministers and bureaucrats like chess pieces, becoming the MMS killer's ultimate target. Bharathi's mother Manimeghalai (Sriranjani) is a headstrong IAS officer who enforces her duty without bowing to political pressures. While Bharathi wages his secret war against corruption and nepotism, his mother wages the same battle, armed with the bureaucracy.

As Bharathi's MMS murders increase, the fearful politicians and bureaucrats hand the case over to a sincere officer. They appoint Manimeghalai as they believe that her persistence will bring the MMS killer to conviction. Now begins a triangular game of action, with Bharathi hunting down corrupt politicians while they target Manimeghalai for her honesty, and Manimeghalai trying to capture the MMS killer (Bharathi).

== Cast ==
- Gautham as Bharathi
- Suhani Kalita as Ramya
- Soori as Bharathi's friend
- K. Bhagyaraj as Ramasamy (Bharathi's father)
- Sriranjani as Manimeghalai (Bharathi's mother)
- Mahadevan as Susa (Ramya’s father)
- Manobala as College Professor
- Sampath Ram as Politician
- Nellai Siva
- Kovai Senthil

== Production ==
The film began production in 2009. R. Raghuraj wrote the story and screenplay of Appavi and also decided to direct it with the intention of making the youth of the country realize the importance of being patriotic. "I call Appavi a patriotic film. So many films are made showing the problems India faces. Why is it that they have not suggested any solutions? My film talks about the problems and their solutions so that India can be a superpower in the world," said Raghuraj. The movie has a record for creating the longest Indian flag stretching to 1115 feet, and 500 college students held in one of its songs. The patriotic song was written by Vairamuthu and composed by Joshua Sridhar. Newcomer Gowtham and Suhani play the lead roles. The director trained Gowtham for 340 hours for the film.

== Reception ==
The New Indian Express wrote that "The way Bharati brings corruption acts to public notice provides some interest. But apart from that, it’s deja vu all the way".
