= Irandu Mugam =

2010 film by R. Aravindraj

- Theatrical release poster
- Directed by: R. Aravindraj
- Produced by: Vaithyalinga Udayar
- Starring: Sathyaraj; Karan; Suhani Kalita
- Cinematography: Abdul Kalam
- Edited by: R. T. Annadurai
- Music by: Bharadwaj
- Production company: Udayar Studios
- Release date: 3 September 2010
- Country: India
- Language: Tamil

Irandu Mugam (transl. Two faces) is a 2010 Indian Tamil-language political action film directed by R. Aravindraj. The film featured Sathyaraj and Karan. It was released on 3 September 2010.

== Plot ==
Parthasarathy (Karan) is the son of a cook and a political science graduate. He aspires to become a minister. His mimicry skills get him acquainted with the Chief Minister, who comes to his village for a meeting. He impresses him to become local leader of the party. This incurs him the wrath of Thamizh Sakthi (Nassar), a leader of the same party, who wants to promote his younger brother.

A turn of events leads to Thamizh Sakthi helping Parthasarathy become MLA with a promise that he should be with him and support him in all shady deals. As it happens, Parthasarathy now becomes a minister. Their corrupt ways earn them money.

There is one Pavithra (Suhani Kalita), the daughter of opposition leader who is in love with Parthasarathy. Meanwhile, enters Sarveswaran (Sathyaraj), an IAS officer who is committed to clean the political system. He has a bad past. He hatches a conspiracy and succeeds in reforming Parthasarathy. The duo now starts to work for the welfare of the people and also bring to book the greedy and corrupt.

== Cast ==
- Sathyaraj as Sarveswaren
- Karan as Parthasarathy
- Suhani Kalita as Pavithra
- Anu Hasan as Sarveswaran's wife
- Nassar as Tamizh Sakthi
- Livingston as Parthasarathy's uncle
- Anuradha Krishnamoorthy as Deivanayaki
- Malavika Avinash as Thilakavathy
- M. S. Bhaskar
- Ganja Karuppu
- Elango Kumaravel as Parthasarathy's friend
- Charuhasan as a Chief Doctor
- Vani Sree Shetty as assassin
- Gayathri Tutlu as young Pavithra

== Soundtrack ==
The soundtrack was composed by Bharadwaj.

- "Kannum Kannum" — Karthik, Surmukhi Raman
- "Minsaram" — Sathyan, Sunitha Menon
- "Yaanai Ketti" — Mukesh Mohamed, Ananthu, Surmega
- "Aasa Vachen" — Sunitha Menon
- "Penn Nenjam" — Bharadwaj

== Critical reception ==
Sify wrote "If you are looking for pure escapist masala fare, Irandu Mugam is just ok." The Times of India wrote, "It is an exciting storyline. But the director falls prey to the beaten-to-death formula — improbable fight scenes included."
