= Rama Rama Raghurama =

- Directed by: Raghuraj
- Written by: Raghuraj
- Produced by: B V Pramod; G N Rajashekar Naidu
- Starring: Rangayana Raghu
- Cinematography: A V Krishnakumar
- Edited by: P R Sounder Rajan
- Music by: V. Harikrishna
- Production company: Maya Movies
- Release date: 3 March 2011
- Country: India
- Language: Kannada

Rama Rama Raghurama is a 2011 Indian Kannada language film directed by Raghuraj and starring Rangayana Raghu. The music of the film was composed by V. Harikrishna.

== Plot ==
Raghurama, an honest police constable fails to fulfill his professional and personal responsibilities. Hence, he undertakes series of attempts to end his life on duty.

== Cast ==
- Rangayana Raghu as Raghurama
- Lakshmi Sharma
- Sadhu Kokila as Raghurama's brother-in-law
- Doddanna
- Shobharaj
- Dr. Nagesh Kaveti
- Friends Haridas G.
- Bullet Prakash
- Achyuth Kumar
- Srinivas Gowda
- Siddesh
- Sundar Raj
- Loknath
- Arun Sagar
- Mico Nagaraj
- M. N. Suresh
- Mallesh Mysore
- NGEF Ramamurthy
- Sangeetha
- Anil Kumar
- Raghava Uday

== Reception ==
=== Critical response ===
A critic from The Times of India scored the film at 3 out of 5 stars and says "Lakshmi Sharma impresses you with the small role she plays as a lover. Doddanna, Sundararaj and Loknath give you a good dose of comic relief. Music by V Harikrishna and cinematography by Krishnakumar are okay". A critic from The New Indian Express wrote "In a bizarre twist of fate, the more he tries to end his life the more positive things happen to him. Doddanna has shown some fine acting skills, and Shobaraj is also convincing as a villain. However, Sadhu Kokila and Bullet Prakash failed to impress the audience". A critic from Deccan Herald wrote "A V Krishnakumar’s camerawork is adequate, complimenting Harikrishna’s music. The makers, determined to give a ‘dream debut as hero’ to Raghu ensure that none of the other actors, except the leading lady (!) are mentioned. Still, Achyuta, Bullet, Doddanna, Sadhu Kokila, Lokanath, Shobhraj and even Rachna Maurya shine in their roles. Rama Rama Raghurama may just turn out to be more than standard fare if the India-Ireland match falls flat of expectations". A critic from Bangalore Mirror wrote "Curiously, the director clubs one scene with another with a prop, not always connected to each other. Though it has nothing to do with the narrative, it hits you and brings out a laughter or two. Shobraj and ‘Uncle’ Loknath stand out with their performances. The music and cinematography are standard fare".
