= Yennamo Yedho =

2014 Indian film by Ravi Thyagarajan

- Film poster
- Directed by: Ravi Tyagarajan
- Written by: Nandini Reddy
- Based on: Ala Modalaindi (Telugu)
- Produced by: P. Ravikumar; P. V. Prasad
- Starring: Gautham Ram Karthik; Rakul Preet Singh; Nikesha Patel
- Cinematography: Gopi Jagadeeswaran
- Edited by: I J Alen
- Music by: D. Imman
- Production company: Ravi Prasad Productions
- Release date: 25 April 2014
- Country: India
- Language: Tamil

Yennamo Yedho (transl. Something random) is a 2014 Indian Tamil language romantic comedy film directed by Ravi Thyagarajan starring Gautham Ram Karthik, Rakul Preet Singh, and Nikesha Patel. A remake of the Telugu film Ala Modalaindi, the film was produced by Ravi Prasad Productions and has music by D. Imman. Gopi Jagadeeswaran was the cinematographer and Lalgudi N Illayaraja, of Vishwaroopam fame, was the art director. The film released on 25 April 2014 to mixed reviews. The film's title was based on the song of the same name from Ko.

In 2019, the film was dubbed in Hindi as Ajab Ashique Ki Gazab Kahani and Telugu as Andamaina Chandamama.

== Plot ==
The film begins with an accident. Gautam is abducted by Chakravarthi. On the way, Gautam is forced to narrate his tale as he talks of stopping a marriage and John too talks of preventing a wedding. Hence, the flashback. Gautam is ready to propose to Simran with a bunch of roses, but destiny has other plans. Elsewhere, Nithya is playing cricket and hits Gautam with her shot. He is then taken to the hospital on a stretcher. Simran falls in love with Dr. Anand, who was treating Gautam and they get married eventually. Gautam is invited and leaves for the wedding, but cannot face Simran. When he walks out, he gets drunk and meets a drunk Nithya, who was actually in love with Anand. They go around freaking out during the night and part ways the next day.

As destiny has it, they happen to meet in a pub after a few days. Gautam accompanies her everywhere. He realises he's in love with her, but before he could tell her, he finds out that she is already engaged. Gautam steps back and stays secluded. Nithya and her fiancé end their engagement over an argument about Gautam. Unaware of this and having moved on, Gautam starts dating a veterinary doctor Kavya, but they break up after an altercation. Nithya realizes that she loves Gautam and goes to his house after his mother dies, to propose to him, but is shocked to see Kavya in his house. Thinking that they both are married, she leaves for Bangalore and accepts the marriage proposal her parents set for her. After realizing Nithya misunderstood him, Gautam and his friends leave for Bangalore to stop the marriage.

On the way to Bangalore, their car stops and Gautam asks for a lift and they accept and that is where he was kidnapped. After a big fight between Gautam and Chakravarthi, it is revealed that John Abraham was looking for the one who gave Gautam a lift, not Gautam. He helps Gautam to reach the wedding. Gautam's friends, who reach the wedding hall, reveal the truth to Nithya. In order to meet Gautam, Nithya escapes from the wedding and ends up asking Chakravarthi for a lift, who accepts looking at the jewellery she is wearing. After listening to her, Chakravarthi realizes that she is Nithya that Gautam came for. He drives back the car to the wedding hall and Nithya take the gun and kidnaps Gautam. Then after a comical scuffle, Nithya reunites with Gautam

== Cast ==
- Gautham Ram Karthik as Gautham
- Prabhu as Chakravarthi
- Rakul Preet Singh as Nithya
- Nikesha Patel as Kavya
- Azhagam Perumal as Narayanan, Nithya's father
- Manobala as Guruji
- Madhan Bob as Madhan, Nithya's uncle
- Amit Bhargav as Anand
- Anupama Kumar as Lakshmi, Gautham's mother
- Surekha Vani as Nithya's mother
- Shakeela as Kujli Plus TV Anchor
- Raviraj as Dr. K. Ravishankar
- Kudikaran Ramesh as Gautham
- Raja Chembolu (credited as Raja Shankar) as Nithya's fiancé
- Sai Prakash as Gautham's brother-in-law
- Yogi Babu as Goon
- Snigdha as Pinky
- Master Adithya as young Gautham
- Master Vijay as the commissioner's son
- Uppalapati Narayana Rao as Kavya's father

== Production ==
Ravi Prasad Outdoor Unit, pioneers in the south for film shooting equipment bought the remake rights of Ala Modalaindi and ventured into film production with this film under the banner of Raviprasad Productions. Ravi Thyagarajan, son of fight master Thyagarajan and a former assistant to the director Priyadarshan, was selected to direct the film and make his directorial debut.

The shooting began on 23 May 2013. The second schedule began on 27 June 2013 in Hyderabad.

== Soundtrack ==
Yennamo Yedho

Soundtrack album by D. Imman
- Released: 2014
- Genre: Feature film soundtrack
- Language: Tamil

D. Imman chronology
Tenaliraman (2014)	Yennamo Yedho (2014)	Sigaram Thodu (2014)

The music was composed by D. Imman.

No.	Song	Singers	Lyrics
1	"Mosale Mosale"	Deepak, A. V. Pooja	Madhan Karky
2	"Muttalai Muttalai"	D. Imman, Maria Roe Vincent	Madhan Karky
3	"Nee Enna Periya Appatucker"	Anirudh, Harshitha Krishnan	Madhan Karky
4	"Pudhiya Ulagai"	Vaikom Vijayalakshmi	Madhan Karky
5	"Shut Up Your Mouth"	Deepak, Shruti Haasan	Madhan Karky

== Critical reception ==
The film received mixed reviews from critics. The Times of India gave the film 2 stars out of 5 and wrote, "It is a convoluted plot that just feels inane on paper but one that could pass off as a comedy of the absurd on screen. But, because of its uneven tone, the film comes across as something that is severely disjointed and unfocussed. The Hindu wrote, "there’s no end to the tiresome sequence of romance and break-ups in Yennamo Yedho. It has everything going wrong for it. A convoluted plot, unimpresive performances and unfunny comedy". Sify wrote "the plot is hackneyed, romance is half baked and lead pair is unimpressive", calling the film "a pale version of the original" and describing it as "heartbreakingly disappointing". Deccan Chronicle wrote, "Despite being the remake of Ala Modalaindi, which was a hit in Telugu, Yennamo Yedho fails to impress".

The New Indian Express wrote, "The film may not be the best of romantic comedies. But it’s a fairly enjoyable watch".
