= Puli (2010 film) =

2010 film by S. J. Suryah

- Theatrical release poster
- Directed by: S. J. Surya
- Written by: S. J. Suryah
- Produced by: Singanamala Ramesh Babu
- Starring: Pawan Kalyan; Nikeesha Patel; Manoj Bajpayee
- Cinematography: Binod Pradhan
- Edited by: Prabhakaran
- Music by: A. R. Rahman
- Production company: Kanagarathna Movies
- Distributed by: Geetha Arts; Ficus
- Release date: 10 September 2010 (India)
- Running time: 163 minutes
- Country: India
- Language: Telugu
- Budget: ₹40 crore

Puli (transl. Tiger), formerly known as Komaram Puli (transl. Tiger of Komaram), is a 2010 Indian Telugu-language action drama film written and directed by S. J. Suryah, starring Pawan Kalyan in the lead role, with Nikesha Patel, Manoj Bajpayee, Saranya Ponvannan, Charan Raj, Nassar, and Ali in supporting roles. The film features a soundtrack by A. R. Rahman and cinematography by Binod Pradhan. It was produced by Singanamala Ramesh Babu, on a ₹40 crore budget and was distributed by Geetha Arts. The film was released on 10 September 2010.

Initially titled Komaram Puli, the film was renamed Puli on its second day of release due to objections from Komaram Sony Rao, the grandson of tribal legend Komaram Bheem, whose name had inspired the original title. The Nizam distribution rights were sold to Geetha Arts for ₹12 crore, a record-breaking sum at the time. Despite the high expectations, Puli was critically panned and ultimately became a box-office bomb.

== Plot ==
A woman, while searching for her missing husband, an honest police officer, faces inhumane treatment from the local police. During her search, she encounters a goon named Saleem and discovers that he killed her husband. As Saleem attempts to kill her, she manages to escape and takes refuge in a local temple. It is revealed that she is pregnant with a son named Puli. Saleem makes another attempt to kill her and assumes she is dead after she falls from a short waterfall. Unbeknownst to him, she survives and vows to make Puli a police officer.

Years later, when terrorists in Malaysia attack the Prime Minister of India, Puli, now an IPS officer, kills all the terrorists, saving the PM's life and restoring the honor of the police. At the subsequent award ceremony, Puli demands and establishes a special task force equipped with advanced technology, composed of honest and capable police officers. He sets up a ₹1 police phone booth outside police stations for those who do not receive justice or experience complacency from police officers. Puli leads the special team with his trusted officers.

Simultaneously, a woman falls for Puli and, pretending to be S.I. Madhumati, makes Puli fall for her, knowing he is determined to marry a policewoman. Though he eventually discovers her deception, he forgives her and they fall in love.

Saleem, now a feared gangster working with another gangster named Nixon, commits crimes at an unprecedented level, including illegal arms deals and black money operations. He either kills or bribes police officers to keep them in line. ACP Ravi Kumar fears him, and the IG has joined hands with him, making many police officers too afraid to file cases against him. Saleem's crimes are meticulously managed, leaving little or no trace.

Puli convinces Ravi Kumar to reopen an old case against Saleem, reminding him of the true meaning of being a police officer. However, their efforts are thwarted due to a lack of evidence. After a minor incident involving Saleem's car being parked in a no-parking zone, Puli frustrates Saleem, indirectly confronting his father's killer without realizing it.

Puli becomes increasingly frustrated as his team's secrets are leaked and his team members are killed one by one. During a shootout, Puli discovers that Nixon is a mole in his team and kills him. Finally, Puli and Saleem face off directly, with Saleem capturing Puli's mother. At this point, Puli's mother reveals the truth about Saleem. Enraged, Puli fights Saleem and forces him to confess to all his crimes, which are broadcast live via a pinhole camera. Thus, Puli avenges his father and restores justice.

== Cast ==
- Pawan Kalyan as Komaram Puli IPS
- Nikeesha Patel as Madhumathi
- Manoj Bajpayee as Al Saleem (voiceover by P. Ravi Shankar)
- Saranya Ponvannan as Puli's mother
- Charan Raj as IG
- Nassar as ACP Ravi Kumar IPS (voiceover by P. Ravi Shankar)
- Girish Karnad as Prime Minister of India
- Ali as Basha
- Chitram Srinu as Constable
- Kovai Sarala as Inspector Madhumati
- Cochin Haneefa as Saleem's PA (Posthumous appearance)
- Brahmaji as Inspector Raj Kumar
- Satyam Rajesh as Puli's driver
- Master Bharath as Newspaper Boy
- Jyothi Krishna
- Gopinath
- S. J. Suryah as Hussain (cameo appearance)
- Shriya Saran as Hussain's girlfriend, a bar dancer (cameo appearance in the item song "Dochey")

== Production ==
=== Development and casting ===
S. J. Suryah initially planned to make the film with Vijay in Tamil in 2005 and sent a bound script to him. But the Tamil project did not happen. The storyline was also discussed with Malayalam actor Suresh Gopi. Later, after confirmation from Kalyan during the filming of Annavaram (2006), it was finalised to be made in Telugu with Kalyan. Hansika Motwani was originally signed to play the heroine but was replaced by Nikesha Patel, who made her acting debut in this film. The film was sent to the censor board on 4 September and received an A certificate.

=== Filming ===
The movie was shot in various parts of Andhra Pradesh and Tamil Nadu, as well as in Malaysia, Singapore, Bangkok and Dubai. The filming sans songs was almost complete by May 2010, and the songs were shot from 18 May onwards. Two songs were choreographed by Bollywood choreographer Ahmed Khan. The songs he choreographed were "Power Star" (Pawan Kalyan's introduction song) and "Dochey" (an item number featuring Shriya Saran). The songs were filmed in two schedules at Annapurna Studios beginning from 18 May. Of the six songs written for the film, four songs were directly included in the film while the remaining two served as background songs.

=== Title ===
The movie was originally titled Komaram Puli. "Komaram" was taken from the surname of the Gond martyr Komaram Bheem, who fought against the erstwhile Asaf Jahi dynasty for the liberation of Hyderabad State. However, following the objections by Komaram Sony Rao, grandson of Komaram Bheem, and also by a section of Telangana Joint Action Committee activists who called for a boycott of the film, the movie was renamed with title Puli on the second day of its release. The soundtrack album is titled Komaram Puli.

== Music ==
The film features a soundtrack consisting of 6 songs composed by A. R. Rahman and lyrics penned by Chandrabose. This is the third among Rahman's only three straight Telugu films that are not remakes or bilinguals. Lyricist Chandrabose collaborated with Rahman for the second time through this film. He took almost three months to write the song "Amma Thale", while all it took to write the song "Maaralente" was 90 minutes.

The release rights of the album were purchased by Sony Music for ₹2 crore which was reportedly the highest amount ever in South Indian cinema. The soundtrack album was released on 11 July 2010 in a function held at HITEX convention hall, Madhapur, Hyderabad. The function was attended by Andhra Pradesh Chief Minister K. Rosaiah, S. J. Suryah, Allu Aravind, Pawan Kalyan, Nikesha Patel, Shriya Saran, A. R. Rahman, Chandrabose, Anand Sai, Singanamala Ramesh, S. R. Murthy and others. The audio was launched by K. Rosaiah, Rahman and his mother Kareema Begum.

The soundtrack got overwhelming response and became a hot seller. The audio sales reached a total of 300,000 of CDs in the first three days, which was an all-time record in Telugu film history. A. R. Rahman's original score also received critical praise. Rahman collaborated with artists from three European countries to re-record the background score.

== Release ==
=== Pre-release ===
Its Nizam rights were sold to Geetha Arts for ₹12 crore (equivalent to ₹29 crore or US$3.1 million in 2026) which was a record sum at the time.

=== Theatrical ===
The film was released worldwide with 950 prints in 1,250 theatres, a record of sorts for a Telugu film. The film's release faced a minor roadblock in the form of its title. The makers of the film re-edited it due to very mixed to poor reviews and re-released the shortened version on 15 September 2010.

== Reception ==
=== Critical response ===
The film critic from NDTV warned the audience by saying, "watch the film at your own risk. It's a big-budget film with a solid casting. Just laugh at the poorly directed action scenes." Jeevi of Idlebrain.com rated the film 2/5 and wrote, "On a whole, Komaram Puli disappoints despite of terrific performances of Pawan Kalyan and Saranya".
