= Ice (2003 film) =

- DVD cover
- Directed by: R. Raghuraj
- Story by: Vakkantham Vamsi
- Based on: Kalusukovalani (Telugu)
- Produced by: Sherif Ahmed
- Starring: Ashok; Priyanka Trivedi; Haripriya
- Cinematography: Sri
- Music by: Devi Sri Prasad
- Production company: Joy Entertainment
- Release date: 4 July 2003
- Country: India
- Language: Tamil

Ice is a 2003 Indian Tamil-language romance film directed by R. Raghuraj. The film stars newcomer Ashok, Priyanka Trivedi and Haripriya, while Vivek and Mouli appeared in other pivotal role. The film produced by, had music scored by Devi Sri Prasad. It is a remake of the 2002 Telugu film Kalusukovalani. The film was released in 2003 to below average collections and reviews.

== Cast ==
- Ashok as Ashok
- Priyanka Trivedi as Anjali
- Haripriya as Madhavi
- Vivek as Pulikesi
- Mouli as Vishwanathan
- R. Sundarrajan as Ashok's uncle
- Devan as Anjali's father
- Madhan Bob as Ashok's father
- Manobala as Director
- Anu Mohan as House owner
- Pandu as Interviewer
- Balu Anand as Interviewer
- Kumarimuthu as Snake charmer
- Yuvarani as Anjali's mother
- Singamuthu as Villager
- Muthukaalai as Auto driver
- Bava Lakshmanan as Minnal's brother
- Swaminathan as Restaurant manager
- Nandha Saravanan as Rowdy
- Japan Kumar (special appearance in the song "Gumthalakkadi")
- Theni Kunjarammal (special appearance in the song "Gumthalakkadi")

== Production ==
Ice is a remake of the director's 2002 Telugu film Kalusukovalani which featured Uday Kiran and Gajala. The film became the maiden production venture of Sherif Ahmed for his Joy Entertainment. Gayathri Raguram was first chosen to play the heroine, but was subsequently replaced by Priyanka Trivedi. Devi Sri Prasad's tunes from the original version were retained, while cranking the camera was Shri, who had apprenticed with P. C. Sriram. The sets are designed by M. Prabhakar, the stunt and dance choreography are by Shiva and Cool Jayant respectively. At the YMCA grounds, Chennai, a song was picturised on the hero. After a schedule in Chennai, the unit shifts to locations abroad to the Alps. The filming was also held at Australia, Vienna, Germany and Switzerland where the original version was shot.

== Soundtrack ==
Devi Sri Prasad reused all songs from the original Telugu film while four songs were newly composed: "Appappa Un Paarvai", "Gumthalakkadi", "Hey Penne" and "Vaaname Enakke".

Song	Singers	Lyrics
"Appappa Un Paarvai"	Ranjith, Kalpana, Anupama	Yugabharathi
"En Vanathin"	Devi Sri Prasad	Kabilan
"Gumthalakkadi"	Manikka Vinayagam, Ambika, Theni Kunjarammal	R. Raghuraj
"Hey Penne"	Karthik, Kalpana	Yugabharathi
"Nenjil Nenjil Un Per"	Sumangali	Thamarai
"Ore Oru Ganam"	Sumangali	Thamarai
"Silaya Silaya"	Shankar Mahadevan, Mathangi	Yugabharathi
"Vaaname Enakke"	Kalpana	Arivumathi

== Release and reception ==
A critic from The Hindu commended the film's technical aspects but stated "as the game goes on without respite, the viewer feels restless and exasperated." Malini Mannath of Chennai Online wrote "And to think that the film's original Telugu version 'Kalasu Kavalani' was a big success in Andhra! At least the Tamil version doesn't look like it will repeat the success story! In the growing list of promising debutants is Ashok who can dance-fight-romance as good as any other hero. Priyanka is a sight for sore eyes. Vivek's is comedy-missed". A critic from Sify wrote "The film is weak due to crippled performances and lack of originality and presentation".

Soon after the release of the films, Ashok signed on to appear in Varma, opposite Chaya Singh. However, the project was later cancelled.
