= Kandhakottai =

- Poster
- Directed by: S. Sakthivel
- Written by: S. Sakthivel
- Produced by: T D Rajha
- Starring: Nakul; Poorna
- Cinematography: E. Krishnasamy
- Edited by: S. Surajkavee
- Music by: Dhina
- Production company: ESK Films International
- Distributed by: AGS Entertainment
- Release date: 19 December 2009
- Running time: 130 minutes
- Country: India
- Language: Tamil

Kandhakottai is a 2009 Indian Tamil-language romantic action film written and directed by S. Sakthivel, starring Nakul and Poorna, whilst Sampath Raj and Santhanam play supporting roles. The music was composed by Dhina. The film was released on 19 December 2009.

== Plot ==
The film is about Siva, who hates love and those who are into such relationships, and even strives to separate couples. On the other hand, Pooja, a girl in Nagercoil, is the opposite of Siva, and takes risks to unite lovers. When Siva's sister Girija falls in love with Pooja's cousin, the two dissimilar characters meet. And when Siva sings Eppadi Ennul Kadhal Vandhadhu, they fall in love. But a man in Nagercoil kills himself when Pooja reveals that she is in love with Siva. His father Annachi is infuriated with the girl and murders her relatives. Siva battles the baddies and marries Pooja.

== Cast ==
- Nakul as Siva
- Poorna as Pooja
- Sampath Raj as Singam Perumal
- Santhanam as Velu, Siva's best friend
- Raviprakash as Siva's father
- Sivaranjani as Siva's mother
- Bala Singh as MLA
- Rajendranath as Inspector Dharmalingam
- Cheran Raj as SP Shanmugan
- Cool Suresh as Siva's friend
- Poochi Senthil as Siva's friend
- Maya Reddy as Durga
- Jayaprakasam
- Ramakrishnan
- Viji Khanna
- Master Madhusoodanan
- Master V. J. Praveen Raj

== Soundtrack ==
The soundtrack was composed by Dhina. Karthik Srinivasan of Milliblog called it "Below par Dhina soundtrack".

Song	Singers	Lyrics
"Kaadhal Paambu"	Benny Dayal, Sowmya Raoh, Dev Prakash	Yugabharathi
"Kala Kala Kandha Kottai"	Tippu, Dhina	Yugabharathi
"Unnai Kadhali Yendru"	Naresh Iyer, Sadhana Sargam	Kabilan
"Eppadi Ennul Kadhal"	Nakul	Viveka
"Dishyum Dishyum"	Shankar Mahadevan, Suchitra	Viveka

== Critical reception ==
Sify stated, "On the whole Kandha Kottai is a typical masala entertainer that is made for the youth audiences. Have fun". The New Indian Express wrote, "Kandhakottai is a film [that] did not raise any great expectation. So there is not much disappointment either, that a script which promised to be different in its earlier scenes, slips into the predictable mode as the story progresses". S. R. Ashok Kumar of The Hindu wrote, "While the first half of the film focusses on romance, action rules in the second half. This mix aims to entertain, which it does", also praising E. Krishnasamy's cinematography, Sakthivel's direction and writing.
