= Suhani Kalita =

Indian actress, Model and Travel Influencer

- Born: Suhani Kalita; 25 December 1991 (age 34); Hyderabad, Telangana, India
- Other name: Baby Zeeba (1996-2004)
- Occupations: Actress, Model
- Years active: 1996–2011

Suhani Kalita is a former Indian actress and model, who has appeared predominantly in Telugu and Hindi films. She won Nandi Award for Best Child Actress for Hindustan - The Mother in 2000.

== Career ==
Suhani has been a household favorite since her childhood days as the child actor she played in Manasantha Nuvve esp. in the song "Tuneega Tuneega".

== Filmography ==
Year	Film	Role	Language	Notes
1996	Bala Ramayanam		Telugu	Child artiste
1999	Sooryavansham		Hindi	Child artiste; uncredited role
1999	Naa Hrudayamlo Nidurinche Cheli		Telugu	Child artiste
2000	Hindustan - The Mother	Harini	Telugu	Child artiste Winner, Nandi Award for Best Child Actress
2001	Eduruleni Manishi	Rani	Telugu	Child artiste
2001	Manasantha Nuvve	Young Anu	Telugu	Child artiste
2002	Kuch Tum Kaho Kuch Hum Kahein	Pinky	Hindi	Child artiste
2003	Ela Cheppanu	Mili	Telugu	Child artiste
2003	Moner Majhe Tumhi	Young Anu	Bengali	Child artiste
2004	Anandamanandamaye	Bhuvana's cousin	Telugu	Child artiste
2007	Savaal	Keerthana Narasimham	Telugu	
2008	Krushi	Aishwarya	Telugu	
2009	Srisailam	Likitha	Telugu	
2010	Sneha Geetham	Mahalakshmi	Telugu	
2010	Irandu Mugam	Pavithra	Tamil	
2011	Appavi	Ramya	Tamil	
