= Nikesha Patel =

British-Indian actress

- Born: Cardiff, Wales
- Occupations: Actress; model

Nikesha Patel is a British-Indian actress. She debuted in the 2010 Telugu film Puli and later went on to work in more than 30 films in Telugu, Kannada, Tamil and Malayalam cinema as a lead.

== Early life ==
Nikesha Patel was born to a Gujarati family in the United Kingdom and raised there. She is born and brought up in Cardiff, Wales and her parents still reside in Pontypridd, Wales. She was a finalist in the 2006 Miss Wales beauty pageant. And won 5 titles for miss India UK. She called herself "a terrible actor" and said that she was rejected six times by Peter Woolridge's acting school in three years, but she finally made a diploma in acting. Since she was 15, she has been part of BBC TV shows like Casualty, Tracy Beaker and Doctor Who.

== Career ==
Patel then moved to India planning to work in Bollywood. She got an offer from actor and filmmaker Dev Anand, who was a friend of her father, to act in his film Beauty Queen, but it was shelved. She made her film debut in the 2010 Indian Telugu language film, Puli, playing the lead female role. This film was the biggest launch pad starring pawan Kalyan and directed by SJ. Surya with a huge technical team of AR Rahman, Binod pradhan and Ahmed Khan. And she moved to the Kannada film industry. Patel had also got offered Hollywood actor-director Steven Seagal's film, but it didn't get materialized. Her next three releases were Kannada films: Narasimha, for which she was nominated for SIIMA Award for Best Female Debutant, Dakota Picture and Varadhanayaka, a remake of the Telugu film Lakshyam (2007). Although Narasimha and Varadanayaka were successful at the box office, she said that these films "were unsatisfying for me as an actress". 2013 she was seen in her second Telugu film Om 3D too, which she called "the most satisfying so far". She had stated in 2012 that she would make her Malayalam debut in Newsmaker opposite Mammootty, playing a reporter. She was also reported to have been signed for Rosshan Andrrews' Malayalam film Mumbai police with prithviraj. While the former did not materialize, the latter film did not feature her.

Patel started working in the Tamil film industry too. Her first Tamil offer was Amali Thumali (initially titled as Nanba) opposite Nakkhul, Shanthanu Bhagyaraj, Santhanam and Swathi Reddy which she said "did not come through", but she was signed for another Tamil film opposite Nakkhul titled Narathan. She has been signed for two more Tamil projects besides Narathan, Yennamo Yedho co-starring Gautham Karthik and Rakul Preet Singh and Thalaivan. She has signed her next films in Kannada, Namaste Madam opposite Srinagar Kitty and in Telugu, RUM, directed and produced by MS Raju. In 2016, she became busy in all languages with Araku Road Lo with Telugu hero Sai stating to release in September and also Tamil film 7 Naatkal with hero Shakthi Vasu. She then signed K.C. Bokadia's Tamil-Telugu first bilingual, directed by himself with popular actor Srikanth and Kasturiraja's film called Paandi Muni, directed by actor Dhanush's father co-starring Bollywood actor Jackie Shroff.

== Filmography ==
| Year | Title | Role(s) | Language(s) | Notes | Ref. |
|---|---|---|---|---|---|
| 2010 | Puli | Madhumathi | Telugu | Telugu Debut | |
| 2012 | Narasimha | Varsha | Kannada | Kannada Debut; Nominated, SIIMA Award for Best Female Debutant | |
| 2012 | Dakota Picture | Radha | Kannada | | |
| 2013 | Varadhanayaka | Sirisha | Kannada | | |
| 2013 | Om 3D | Rhea | Telugu | | |
| 2014 | Thalaivan | Anusha | Tamil | Tamil Debut | |
| 2014 | Yennamo Yedho | Kavya | Tamil | | |
| 2014 | Namaste Madam | Rukmini | Kannada | | |
| 2015 | Alone | Priya | Kannada | | |
| 2016 | Karaioram | Priya | Tamil | | |
| 2016 | Narathan | Maya/Swetha | Tamil | | |
| 2016 | Luv U Alia | | Kannada | Cameo appearance | |
| 2016 | Araku Road Lo | Roja | Telugu | | |
| 2017 | 7 Naatkal | Pooja | Tamil | | |
| 2018 | Bhaskar Oru Rascal | Kalyani | Tamil | | |
| 2019 | Market Raja MBBS | Steffany | Tamil | | |
