= Kalusukovalani =

2002 film by R. Raghuraj

- Directed by: R. Raghuraj
- Written by: Story & Screenplay: R. Raghuraj; Dialogues: Vakkantham Suryanarayana Rao; Vakkantham Vamsi
- Produced by: Raju; Praveen; Giri
- Starring: Uday Kiran; Gajala; Prathyusha; Kaikala Satyanarayana
- Cinematography: Sameer Reddy
- Edited by: Shankar
- Music by: Devi Sri Prasad; Deva (1 song)
- Release date: 8 February 2002
- Running time: 140 minutes
- Country: India
- Language: Telugu

Kalusukovalani (transl. In order to meet) is a 2002 Indian Telugu-language romantic comedy film directed by R. Raghuraj and written by Vakkantham Vamsi. The film stars Uday Kiran, Gajala and Prathyusha. The film was Prathyusha's final film; she died at the age of 20 exactly two weeks after the film's release. Kalusukovalani was a moderate success at the box-office. The film was remade by Raghuraj in Tamil as Ice (2003).

== Plot ==
Ravi (Uday Kiran), a strong headed young man gets an opportunity to travel to Switzerland after meeting Viswanatham (Satyanarayana) and becomes the general manager of Vishwanathan's business. He meets Anjali (Gajala) there and falls in love, however fate splits them apart. Back in India he becomes the head of Vishwanathan's entire business. The rest of the film is about the issues he faces and whether he succeeds in his love.

== Cast ==
- Uday Kiran as Ravi
- Gajala as Anjali
- Prathyusha as Madhavi
- Sunil as Acchi
- Giri Babu as Jagadiswara Rao
- Kaikala Satyanarayana as Vishwanatham
- Dharmavarapu Subramanyam as Subramanyam
- Vizag Prasad as Anjali's father
- Gautam Raju as Gautam, Ravi's friend
- Madhumitha as Shanti, Anjali's friend
- Ananth as Bar waiter
- Sudha as Ravi's mother
- Annapoorna as Anjali's aunt
- Prudhvi Raj as Interviewer
- Sivannarayana Naripeddi as Interviewer
- Gundu Sudarshan as Priest
- Junior Relangi as Interviewer
- Jyothi Lakshmi as herself (special appearance in the song "Shakeela")

== Production ==
The songs were picturised at Araku, Germany and Austria.

== Soundtrack ==
The music was composed by Devi Sri Prasad and released by Aditya Music. "Shakeela" song was composed by Deva.

Kalusukovalani

Soundtrack album by Devi Sri Prasad
- Released: 2002
- Recorded: 2002
- Genre: Soundtrack
- Length: 31:27
- Label: Aditya Music
- Producer: Devi Sri Prasad

Devi Sri Prasad chronology
Anandam (2001)	Kalusukovalani (2002)	Sontham (2002)

Track list
No.	Title	Lyrics	Music	Singer(s)	Length
1.	"Udayinchina"	Devi Sri Prasad	Devi Sri Prasad	Devi Sri Prasad	5:22
2.	"Aakasam"	Devi Sri Prasad	Devi Sri Prasad	Sumangali, Kid Sathya	4:46
3.	"Shakeela"	Kulasekhar	Deva	Devan, Mathangi	5:46
4.	"Cheliya Cheliya"	Kulasekhar	Devi Sri Prasad	Devi Sri Prasad, Kalpana	4:54
5.	"Tala Talamani"	Sirivennela Seetharama Sastry	Devi Sri Prasad	S. P. B. Charan, Harini	4:54
6.	"Pade Pade"	Sirivennela Seetharama Sastry	Devi Sri Prasad	Sumangali	1:34
7.	"Oke Okka Kshanam"	Sirivennela Seetharama Sastry	Devi Sri Prasad	Sumangali	1:33
8.	"Priya Priya"	Sirivennela Seetharama Sastry	Devi Sri Prasad	G. Venugopal, Sumangali	2:38
Total length:					31:27

== Reception ==
Jeevi of Idlebrain.com wrote that "Over all, Kalusukovalani is an average fare". A critic from Sify wrote that "The only saving grace of this insipid movie is the music of Devi Sri Prasad and the camera of Sameer Reddy". Andhra Today wrote "Director Raghuraj does little to hide the fact that he is new to the job. Although the story is quite good, it becomes a casualty in the hands of the newcomer. The first half is slow, but the second half compensates by its interesting scenes while Ravi and Anjali are searching for each other".
