= Priyadarshini (singer) =

Singaporean-Indian playback singer

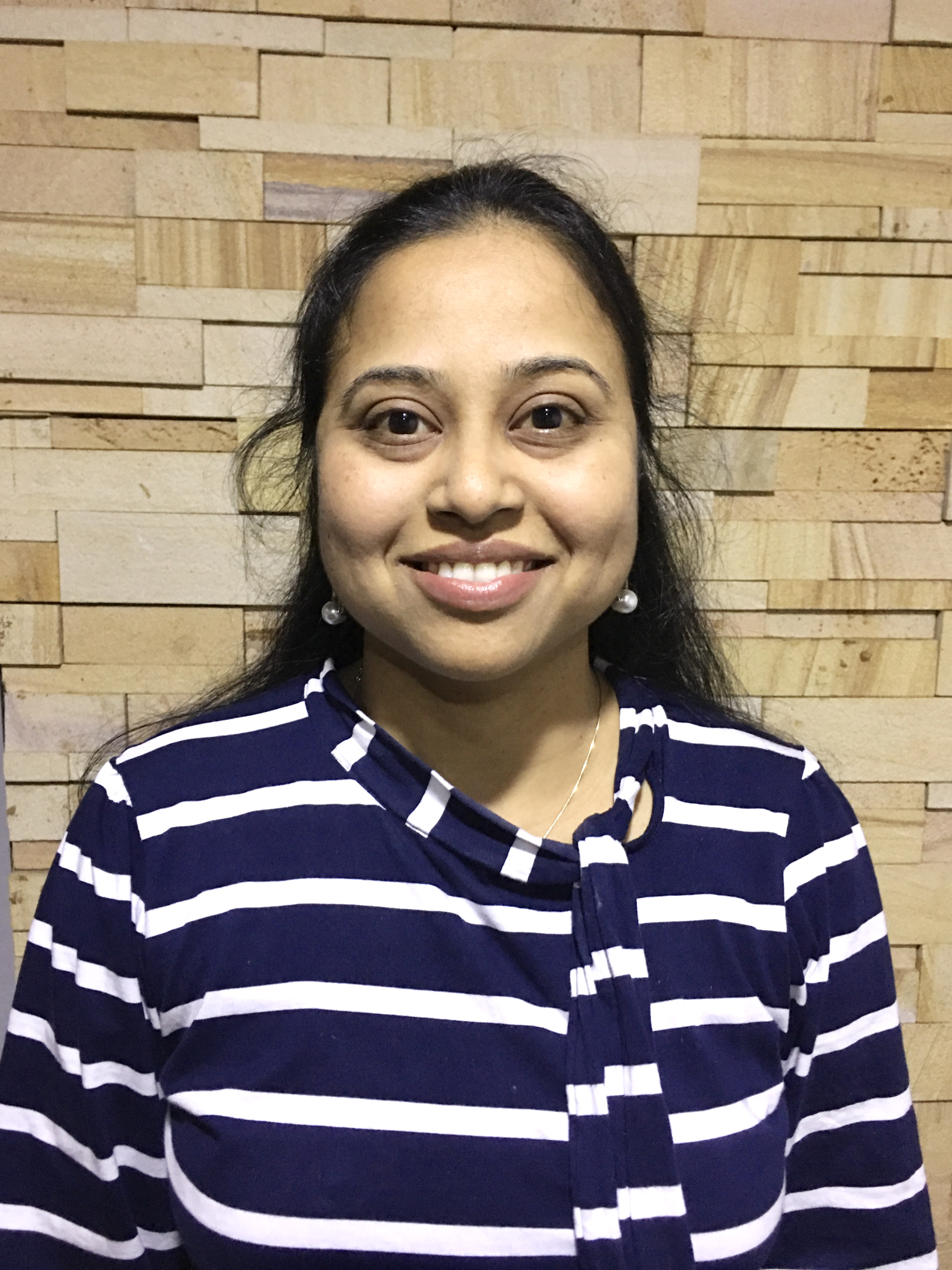

Background information
- Born: Priyadarshini; Chennai, Tamil Nadu, India
- Genres: classical; pop; filmi
- Occupation: Playback singer
- Years active: 2003–present
- Website: priyadarshini.sg

Priyadarshini Ram, also known as Priyadharshi Ram or mononymously as Priyadarshini, is a Singaporean-Indian playback singer who has performed in more than 180 movies in the Tamil, Kannada, Telugu and Hindi cinema industries. She has also sung more than 800 songs for devotional and private albums in 10 languages.

She began her career as a playback singer by performing a duet song with Hariharan for the Tamil film Kadhal Dot Com, released in 2004. She made her debut in Kannada Films through the movie Ajju for Rajesh Ramanath music. She also sang in Telugu Cinema for D Imman and sang background vocals in the Hindi film Garam Masala starring Akshay Kumar. Later she sung a duet with S. P. Balasubrahmanyam in the Kannada movie Rocky in 2008.

She has worked with music directors such as Bharadwaj, D. Imman, Hamsalekha, Mano Murthy, Gurukiran, R. P. Patnaik, Rajesh Ramnath, K. Kalyan, and S. A. Rajkumar, Mahesh Mahadev, M. N. Krupakar, Ravish and has also recorded jingles and albums.

She holds Bachelor’s degree in Electrical & Electronics Engineering from Nanyang Technological University, Singapore, Master’s degree in Music from the University of Madras and has a PhD in film music from the University of Mysore.

== Early life ==
Priyadarshini was born in Chennai and grew up in Doha, Qatar and Singapore. Her father Ram is a Chemical Engineer, Tecnicas Reunidas. Her mother's name is Sumathi. At the age of three, Priyadarshini started learning music. When she was four years old, she began singing and took part in singing competitions hosted by radio stations, TV Channels in Chennai and Singapore. During her high school at Yishun Junior College, she won the championship trophy in the tertiary category in Singapore Radio Oli 96.8FM’s Singing competition

== Playback songs ==
This is a partial list of notable films where Priyadarshini has worked as a playback singer.

Key
†	Denotes films that have not yet been released

Year	Film/Album	Language	Song	Co-singer(s)	Lyrics	Music director
2004	Kadhal Dot Com	Tamil	"Kadhal Kadhal"	Hariharan	"Palani Bharathi"	Bharadwaj
2006	Kusthi	Tamil	"Masala Maharani"	Ranjith	Pa. Vijay	D. Imman
2006	Julie	Kannada	"Navanitha Chora" "Ee Haadu Modala Haadu"	"Solo"	"K.C.Kiran"; K. Kalyan	Rajesh Ramnath
2007	Cheluvina Chittara	Kannada	"Kendowle Kane Chendadlu Kane" "Bytu Coffee"	Chorus; Nanditha, Chetan Sosca	S. Narayan	Mano Murthy
2008	Rocky	Kannada	"Snehada Chiguru"	S. P. Balasubrahmanyam	"Panchajanya"	"Venkat-Narayan"
2010	Panchakshari	Telugu	"Aigiri Nandini"			Chinna
2011	Nandhi	Tamil	"Mayanginen Mayanginen"	Mukesh Mohamed	"Muthu Vijayan"	Bharadwaj
2011	Sri Naga Shakthi	Kannada	"Baaramma Olidu"	Badri Prasad	"Goturi"	R S Ganesh Narayan
2014	Naan Than Bala	Tamil	"Thiru Vai" "Uyire Unakkaga"	Solo; Srinivas	"Vaali" "Na. Muthukumar"	Venkat Krishi
2019	Jhansi I.P.S †	Kannada	"Anuragada Aleyali"	Solo	"Mahesh Mahadev"	M N Krupakar
2022	Khadak	Kannada	"Saddilade"	Chethan Naik	V. Nagendrapprasad	M N Krupakar

== Awards ==
- 2026 - "Music Video of the Year Global" by Josie Music Awards along with Mahesh Mahadev
- 2026 - "Sangeetha Ratna Award" by Sandesh Youva Vedike on its 34th Annual Award Ceremony
- 2025 - "International Vocal Duo of the Year" along with Mahesh Mahadev at ISSA Awards, International Singer & Songwriters Association, Atlanta
- 2025 - "Vishwakarma Seva Rathna" at Virat Vishwakarma Mahotsava
- 2025 - "Sri Raghavendra Sadbhavana Award" by Aryabhata Cultural Organisation
- 2025 - Nominated for "World Artist of the Year" at Josie Music Awards
- 2025 - "Gana Kala Saraswati Award" at Satya Sai Tapovanam
- 2024 - "Versatile Playback Singer Award" at Star Icon of India Awards
- 2024 - Nominated for "World Music Vocalist of the Year" at Josie Music Awards
- 2024 - Nominated for "World Artist of the Year" at Josie Music Awards
- 2023 - "Silver Screen Woman Achiever Award" - For outstanding contribution to film industry
