= R. Raghuraj =

Indian film director

- Occupations: Director, screenwriter, editor
- Years active: 1997–present

R. Raghuraj is an Indian film director and screenwriter, who has worked on Kannada, Tamil, and Telugu-language films. After beginning his career in Tamil films, Raghuraj has experienced more success in Telugu and Kannada films.

== Career ==
After beginning his career as a photo journalist, Raghuraj apprenticed as an editor with B. Lenin, before receiving an opportunity from producer K. T. Kunjumon to direct his first feature film, Sakthi (1997). The film, featuring Vineeth and Yuvarani in the lead roles, received negative reviews and performed poorly at the box office. Raghuraj then took a sabbatical before re-emerging with the Telugu film, Kalusukovalani (2002), which became a box office success. This prompted Raghuraj to remake the film as Ice (2003) in Tamil, with newcomer Ashok and Priyanka Trivedi in the lead roles. Comparatively, the Tamil version did not perform as well and critics noted that the film "makes viewers feel restless". In 2004, Raghuraj briefly worked on a project titled Jockey with Prashanth, Laila and Malavika in the lead roles, but the film was later stalled.

In 2009, Raghuraj revealed that he was working on a trilogy of vigilante films and that Appavi would be the first of the three. Prior to release, the film was reported in the media for producing India's largest flag for a sequence, at 1115 feet. The film eventually had a delayed release in 2011. Raghuraj then moved to make films in the Kannada film industry, and has worked on four projects including Boss (2011) and Namaste Madam (2014).

== Filmography ==
Year	Film	Language	Notes
1997	Sakthi	Tamil	
2002	Kalusukovalani	Telugu	
2003	Ice	Tamil	
2011	Boss	Kannada	
2011	Rama Rama Raghurama	Kannada	
2011	Appavi	Tamil	
2013	Sidila Mari	Kannada	
2014	Namaste Madam	Kannada	
2016	Supari Surya	Kannada	
2019	4 Letters	Telugu	Also editor
