= Khadak Malegaon =

Village in Maharashtra

- village
- Interactive map of Khadak Malegaon
- Coordinates: 20°10′30″N 74°10′05″E
- Country: India
- State: Maharashtra
- District: Nashik

Area
  - Total: 1,962.72 ha (4,850.0 acres)

Population
  - Total: 5,314
  - Density: 270.7/km^{2} (701.2/sq mi)

Languages
  - Official: Marathi
- Time zone: UTC+5:30 (IST)
- pin code: 422304
- Vehicle registration: MH-15
- Coastline: 0 kilometres (0 mi)

Khadak Malegaon, Subdistrict-Niphad, District-Nashik, Maharashtra, India, 422304. The village is well known for production of quality grapes. Khadak Malegaon contributes a remarkable supply quantity of grapes every year to the country and abroad. Khadak Malegaon is situated on banks of river Shelu and on Niphad-Chandwad Connecting Road and shares border with Pimplad in East, Khangaon in South, Deorgaon in North-West, Sarole Kh. in South-West and Vanasgaon.

== Demographics ==
According to Census of India 2011, the total population of Khadak Malegaon was 5314. The sex ratio was 949 (females per 1,000 males), with 2727 males and 2587 females. The number of households is estimated to be 935.

== Awards ==
By consistent efforts of administrative body (Grampanchayat) and dedication of people, Khadak Malegaon won the "Paryavaran Vikasratna Puraskar" in 2011, an award offered by Government for development of Environment to the local bodies. The village had also won the awards by Government of Maharashtra listed below.

1. "Sant Gadge Baba Gram Swchata Ani Nagri Swachta Puraskar" from 2001 to 2008.
2. "Yashwantrao Chavan Gaurav Gramsabha Puraskar" for the year 2011-2012.
3. "Mahatma Gandhi Tantamukta Gaon" from 2001 to 2008.

== Administration ==
Khadak Malegaon has a Group Gram Panchayat for day-to-day administration. The District Zilla Panchayat headquarters is at Nashik. Khadak Malegaon has commercial banks "Kotak Mahindra Bank", "Nashik District Central co-operative bank", and Agricultural Co-operative Society.

== Utility services ==
The village water supply is controlled by gram panchayat. The main source of water for drinking and agricultural purposes is from "Khadak Malegaon Dam" which is situated on Shelu River at South-West of the village. The Electricity is Distributed by Mahavitaran (Maharashtra State Electricity Distribution Co. Ltd. The largest telephone service provider is the Central Govt. owned BSNL, which provides fixed line, Internet as well as mobile WLL services. GSM Cell phone coverage is extensive, and the main service providers are Vodafone, Airtel, BSNL, Reliance Communications and Idea Cellular. Reliance Jio Infocom Limited (RJIL) started its high speed 4G LTE services in 2017.

== Education ==
The primary education system is run by Zilla Parishad. High school is set up by the Local Body. The village will soon establish its own Jr. College which is under construction at present. Village also has private body run English medium school having only Montessori Section.

== Entertainment ==
The Annual Fair is held in the month of January/February popularly known as"Haribaba Yatra". People on this day takes blessings from Saint Haribaba Temple, which is decorated on this occasion. Agricultural tourism plays a big role in the development of a grape garden and also in January February, Rocks packs a huge tour of village deity Hari Baba in Malegaon as well as Pola, Dashera, Diwali, Holi and Gudipada.
