= Dharma Keerthiraj =

Indian actor

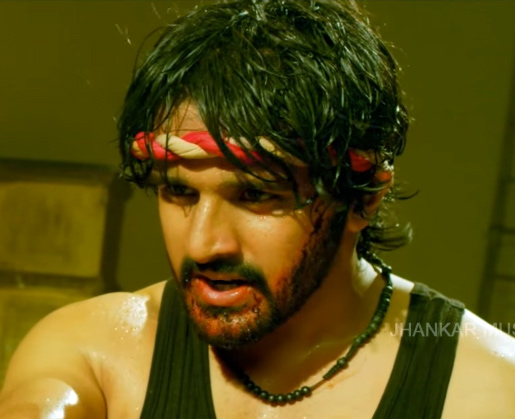
- Dharma in 2015 Kannada film Mumtaz
- Born: Dharma; 7 July 1984 (age 41); Bengaluru
- Occupation: Actor, Model
- Years active: 2008–present
- Father: Keerthiraj

Dharma Keerthiraj is an Indian actor who works predominantly in Kannada-language films. who is fondly known as ‘Cadbury huduga’ for his role in Navagraha (2008). He is the contestant in the 2024 reality show Bigg Boss Kannada 11.

== Career ==
Dharma Keerthiraj started his acting career with the 2008 film Navagraha, directed by Dinakar Thoogudeepa, starring Darshan and Sharmila Mandre. He later played lead roles in Olave Vismaya, Mumtaz, Khadak, and other films.

== Filmography ==
| Year | Film | Role | Notes | Ref |
|---|---|---|---|---|
| 2008 | Navagraha | Vicky | | |
| 2010 | Olave Vismaya | Manu | | |
| 2015 | Mumtaz | Ranjith | | |
| 2022 | Khadak | Dharma | | |
| 2023 | The Fighter Suman | Suman | Dubbed release | |
| 2023 | O Manase | Keerthi | | |
| 2023 | Ronnie: The Hunter | | | |
| 2024 | Tenant | Sundresh | | |
| 2025 | Takila | | | |
| 2025 | Talvar | Talvar | | |
| 2025 | Dasarahalli | Tejas | | |
| 2025 | Bullet | | | |
| 2026 | Blood Roses | CI Arun Gogoi | Telugu film | |
| 2026 | Bengaluru Inn | Ram | | |
