= Khadak (2022 film) =

2022 Kannada film

- Directed by: TN Nagesh
- Produced by: Valli, Singapura Siddaramaya
- Starring: Dharma Keerthiraj; Anusha Rai; Kabir Duhan Singh; Suman Talwar
- Cinematography: Shankar
- Edited by: Sanjeev Reddy
- Music by: MN Krupakar
- Production company: Nandini Combines
- Release date: 17 June 2022
- Running time: 135 minutes
- Country: India
- Language: Kannada

Khadak is a 2022 Indian Kannada-language crime action film, directed by TN Nagesh and produced by S Valli & Singapura Siddaramaya. It was produced under the banner of Nandini Combines. The film features Dharma Keerthiraj, Anusha Rai, and Kabir Duhan Singh. The score and soundtrack for the movie were made by M.N. Krupakar, the cinematography is done by Shankar Shanmugam, and the editing is done by Sanjeev Reddy.

== Plot ==
Dharma is an unselfish person who strives for the welfare of society by helping the poor and fighting injustice. He is the son of Major Suryakanth, who was assassinated in front of his son despite denying selling military secrets. Dharma becomes a police officer as an adult to exact revenge on those who killed his parents.

On the other hand, Dharma enjoys life with her group of friends and loves Priya (Anusha Rai). He has been praised by the public for coming to the aid of an elderly man who has acquired land from MLAs and helped to build Kannada school.

== Cast ==
- Dharma Keerthiraj as Dharma
- Anusha Rai as Priya
- Kabir Duhan Singh
- Suman Talwar

== Production ==
Darshan began the movie's production in 2019.

== Soundtrack ==
Khadak

Soundtrack album by MN Krupakar
- Released: 18 April 2022
- Genre: Feature film soundtrack
- Language: Kannada
- Label: A2 Music

The soundtrack is composed by M.N. Krupakar.

Kannada tracklist
No.	Title	Lyrics	Singer(s)	Length
1.	"Bharatha Mathege"	Prathap Reddy	MN Krupakar	02:35
2.	"Saddilade"	V. Nagendra Prasad	Chethan Naik, Priyadarshini	04:05
3.	"Bisi Bisi Hudugi"	V. Nagendra Prasad	Pooja Rao, Anirudh Shastry	04:23
4.	"Preethiya Sarigama"	V. Nagendra Prasad	Suman Narayan, Madwesh Bharadwaj	04:17

== Reception ==
Vinay Lokesh of The Times of India rated the film 2.5/5 stars and wrote "A revenge drama that falls flat ".
