= Sunitha Sarathy =

Indian playback singer

- Born: Sunitha Sarathy Chennai, Tamilnadu, India
- Genres: Western Classical, Gospel, R&B
- Occupation: Singer
- Instrument: Vocalist
- Years active: 2002–current

Sunitha Sarathy is an Indian vocalist and performer in both Indian contemporary and Western classical music genres. She is also a gospel singer who performs in various church choirs. After having won the "Virgin Voice Choice" contest – a joint initiative of Channel V and Virgin Records in the year 2000, Sarathy debuted into film playback in the year 2002.

She debuted as a playback singer with the Tamil film Yei! Nee Romba Azhagey Irruke guest-singing the prelude and interlude portions of the song "Ini Naanum Naanillai" with Srinivas and Sujatha Mohan as the lead singers. Sarathy has around 200 film songs in various languages, performances as singer-keyboardist-percussionist across a wide spectrum of Western music genres including classical, jazz, soul and R&B, neo-soul and quiet storm, and a prolific output of gospel songs to her credit.

== Career ==
Sarathy got a national recognition for her playback singing for a Hindi – Tamil bilingual film Yuva / Aaytha Ezhuthu in 2004 both directed by Mani Ratnam with music composition by A. R. Rahman. Soon after this, Sarathy recorded her voice for many successful soundtracks in various languages. Some of her notable works are for the films that include Mitr, My Friend, Anniyan, Polladhavan, Vallavan, Kana Kandaen, Don 2, Happy Days, Sainikudu, Cheluvina Chittara among others.

Sarathy performed for a song at the 2006 Asian Games.

In July 2013, Sunitha Sarathy became the first solo female performer from India to be signed by AKG microphones as an endorsee

== Discography ==
=== Tamil ===
Year	Film title	Song	Composer	Co-singer(s)
2002	Hey! Nee Romba Azhaga Irukke	"Ini Naanum Naanillai"	Srinivas	Srinivas, Sujatha Mohan
2003	Kaakha Kaakha	"Thoodu Varumaa"	Harris Jayaraj	Febi Mani
2003	Boys	"Maaro Maaro"	A. R. Rahman	Karthik, George, Kunal Ganjawala, Annupamaa
2003	Kurumbu	"Adichchi Pudichchi"	Yuvan Shankar Raja	Devan Ekambaram
2004	Aaytha Ezhuthu	"Yaakai Thiri"	A. R. Rahman	A. R. Rahman, Pop Shalini, Tanvi Shah
2004	Aaytha Ezhuthu	"Hey Goodbye Nanba"	A. R. Rahman	Shankar Mahadevan, Lucky Ali, Karthik
2004	Arasatchi	"Arakonathil"	Harris Jayaraj	
2004	Kaadhal	"Ivanthaana"	Joshua Sridhar	
2004	New	"New New"	A. R. Rahman	Blaaze, Karthik, Vijay Prakash, Tanvi Shah
2004	Jana	"Poochandi Vanthutta"	Dhina	
2005	Kana Kandaen	"Chinna Chinna"	Vidyasagar	Tippu
2005	Sachien	"Dai Dai Kattikoda"	Devi Sri Prasad	Karthik
2005	Anniyan	"Stranger in Black"	Harris Jayaraj	Chennai Chorale
2005	Kadhal FM	"Un Udal"	Aravind-Shankar	Sandeep
2005	Jithan	"Ennai Thedi"	Srikanth Deva	Karthik
2005	Englishkaran	"Yeh Thiruda"	Deva	Srikanth Deva
2005	Chinna	"Bailare Bailare"	D. Imman	
2005	Bambara Kannaley	"Thakadhimi Thakadimi"	Srikanth Deva	
2005	Aaru	"Thottutae"	Devi Sri Prasad	Karthik
2006	Sivappathigaram	"Kalloori Saalaikkul"	Vidyasagar	Karthik, Jack Smelly
2006	Vallavan	"Hip Hip Hurray"	Yuvan Shankar Raja	Nakul, Ranjith, Karthik
2006	Saravana	"Gori Thera"	Srikanth Deva	Silambarasan
2006	Madrasi	"Adho Andha Paravai" (remix)	D. Imman	D. Imman
2006	Kedi	"Chumma Chumma"	Yuvan Shankar Raja	
2006	Chennai Kadhal	"Angel Angel"	Joshua Sridhar	Karthik
2007	Polladhavan	"Engeyum Eppodhum"	Yogi B	S. P. Balasubrahmanyam, Yogi B
2007	Polladhavan	"Neeye Sol"	G. V. Prakash Kumar	Benny Dayal
2007	Oram Po	"Yaar Iraivanai"	G. V. Prakash Kumar	George Peter
2007	Achacho	"Eaye Eaye"	M. K. S. Narula Khan	
2007	Achacho	"Thottu Vidu"	M. K. S. Narula Khan	
2007	Sivi	"Neruppum"	Dharan	Ranjith
2008	Satyam	"Chellame Chellame"	Harris Jayaraj	Balram, Bombay Jayashree
2008	Nenjathai Killadhe	"Hello Hello"	Premgi Amaren	Ranjith
2008	Nepali	"Wanna Become A Lady Bomb"	Srikanth Deva	Megha
2008	Dhanam	"Ulagam Kidakkuthu"	Ilaiyaraaja	
2009	Modhi Vilayadu	"Paathi Kaadhal"	Colonial Cousins	Bombay Jayashree
2009	Kudiyarasu	"Ayndharai Adiyil"	Karthik Raja	Malgudi Subha
2009	1977	"Arabi Kadal"	Vidyasagar	
2009	Newtonin Moondram Vidhi	"Mudhal Murai"	F. S. Faizal	S. J. Suryah, Sam P. Keerthan
2010	Jaggubhai	"Thuru Thuru"	Rafee	
2010	Paiyaa	"Suthude Suthude"	Yuvan Shankar Raja	Karthik
2010	Naanayam	"Kooda Kooda"	James Vasanthan	
2010	Kanimozhi	"Penne Pogathey"	Satish Chakravarthy	Clinton Cerejo, Sam P. Keerthan, Timmy
2011	7aam Arivu	"The Rise of Damo"	Harris Jayaraj	Hao Wang
2011	Sadhurangam	"Ennanna"	Vidyasagar	
2011	Vithagan	"Vegamaai"	Joshua Sridhar	Benny Dayal
2012	Leelai	"Bubble Gum"	Satish Chakravarthy	Benny Dayal, Suvi Suresh, Leon James
2012	Oru Kal Oru Kannadi	"Kaadhal Oru"	Harris Jayaraj	Aalap Raju, Vedala Hemachandra
2012	Mirattal	"Zumba"	Pravin Mani	
2014	Kabadam	"Hey Pulla"	Sazzy	Sachin
2014	I	"Ennodu Nee Irundhal"	A. R. Rahman	Sid Sriram
2014	Yennai Arindhaal	"Yaen Ennai"	Harris Jayaraj	Kharesma Ravichandran
2014	Yaamirukka Bayamey	"Ennamo Edho"	S. N. Prasad	Benny Dayal
2014	Vingyani	"X Chromosome Y Chromosome"	Maris Vijay	
2015	Purampokku Engira Podhuvudamai	"Orea Oru Murai"	Varshan	Vijay Prakash, Ranjana
2015	Iruvar Ondranal	"Eno Unnai"	Guru Krishnan	
2015	Romeo Juliet	"Thoovanam"	D. Imman	Vishal Dadlani
2016	Navarasa Thilagam	"Ayyayyo Vasama"	Siddharth Vipin	Karthik
2016	Meen Kuzhambum Mann Paanaiyum	"Hey Puthrajaya Poove"	D. Imman	Jithin Raj
2018	Tik Tik Tik	"Tik Tik Tik"	D. Imman	Yuvan Shankar Raja, Yogi B
2018	Chekka Chivantha Vaanam	"Sevandhu Pochu Nenju"	A. R. Rahman	Arjun Chandy, D. Sathyaprakash
2018	NOTA	"Yethikka Yethikka"	Sam C. S.	Benny Dayal
2019	Saaho	"Bad Boy"	Badshah	Badshah, Benny Dayal
2019	Bigil	"Idharkuthaan"	A. R. Rahman	Dhee, Arjun Chandy
2019	Aladdin	"Speechless"	Alan Menken	
2020	Mafia: Chapter 1	"Beast in the House"	Jakes Bejoy	Travis A. King
2021	Iruvar Ullam	"Aadum Nenje"	Vijay Antony	
2022	Ward 126	"Vazhi Nadathidum"	Varun Sunil	Varun Sunil, Senthuzhan
2022	Ponniyin Selvan: I	"Climax Lament" (BGM)	A. R. Rahman	
2022	Vaadi Vaadi (single)	"Vaadi Vaadi"	Harris Jayaraj	Ravi G, Nicholas Samuel
2024	Brother	"Badugas Night"	Harris Jayaraj	Yogi Sekar
2024	Teenz	"Ikky Pikky"	D. Imman	Christopher Stanley
2024	Had Enough	Had Enough	Sunitha Sarathy	Saindhavi, Soundarya Bala Nandakumar, Nithyashree
2025	2K Love Story	"Yethuvarai Ulagamo"	D. Imman	Pravin Saivi

=== Other Languages ===
Year	Song	Film title	Language	Composer	Co-singer(s)
2002	"Give me Hugs"	Mitr, My Friend	English	Vikesh Mehta	
2003	"Warriors in Peace"	Warriors of Heaven and Earth	English/ Mandarin	A. R. Rahman	
2003	"Seduction Saawariya"	Boom	Hindi	Sandeep Chowta	Sonu Kakkar
2003	"Maaro Maaro"	Boys	Telugu	A. R. Rahman	Karthik, George, Kunal Ganjawala, Annupamaa
2003	"Habibi"	Tehzeeb	Hindi	A. R. Rahman	
2004	"My Heart Beats"	Prana	Kannada		
2004	"Shaaba Shaaba"	Runway	Malayalam	Suresh Peters	Afsal
2004	"Fanaa"	Yuva	Hindi	A. R. Rahman	A. R. Rahman, Tanvi Shah
2004	"Hey Khuda Hafiz"	Yuva	Hindi	A. R. Rahman	Lucky Ali, Karthik
2004	"Andathanama"	Gharshana	Telugu	Harris Jayaraj	Febi Mani
2004	"La La Lahiri"	Mass	Telugu	Devi Sri Prasad	Venu
2005	"My Wish comes true"	Kisna	Hindi	A. R. Rahman	
2005	"F TV Chiranjeevi"	Andarivaadu	Telugu	Devi Sri Prasad	KK
2006	"Bangaranni"	Nuvvu Nenu Prema	Telugu		
2006	"Byla Bylamo"	Sainikudu	Telugu	Harris Jayaraj	Lesle Lewis, Anushka Manchanda
2007	"Ye Cheekati"	Happy Days	Telugu	Mickey J Meyer	Ranjith
2008	"He Dil Deewana"	Twenty 20	Malayalam	Suresh Peters	George Peter, Suresh Peters
2009	"Saregama Saregama"	Jolly Days	Kannada	Mickey J Meyer	Ranjith
2010	"Hey CM"	Leader	Telugu	Mickey J Meyer	
2010	"Non Stop"	Namo Venkatesa	Telugu	Devi Sri Prasad	Karthik
2011	"Dushman Mera"	Don 2	Hindi	Shankar–Ehsaan–Loy	Shankar Mahadevan
2011	"The Rise of Damo"	7aam Arivu	Telugu	Harris Jayaraj	Hao Wang
2011	"Its a Game"	Game	Hindi	Shankar–Ehsaan–Loy	
2011	"Nuvvante Naaku"	Mogudu	Telugu	Babu Shankar	
2012	"Ellinda Banthu"	Toofan	Kannada	Elvin Josuha	Kunal Ganjawala
2019	"Bad Boy"	Saaho	Malayalam	Badshah	Badshah, Benny Dayal
2019	"Breaking My Heart"	Suryakantham	Telugu	Mark K Robin	
2019	"Speechless"	Aladdin	Telugu	Alan Menken	
