= Vikramaditya (actor) =

Indian actor

- Born: 13 November 1983 (age 42); Maharashtra, India
- Other name: Vicky
- Occupation: Actor
- Years active: 2003–2008

Vikramaditya Shukla is an Indian former actor who has appeared in Tamil and Telugu language films.

== Career ==
Vikramaditya made his debut in the Tamil slasher film, Whistle (2003), with a critic noting he was "apt" for the role. Vikramaditya then portrayed two supporting roles, firstly in Sundar C's Chinna (2005) and then in a negative role in Bambara Kannaley (2005), though both films were met with unfavourable responses from critics and at the box office. He was then selected to portray the leading male role in the Telugu film Manasu Palike Mouna Raagam (2006) which had Sneha portray the leading role. The film released to negative reviews.

Vikramaditya then portrayed a husband engaging in an illicit affair in Tholaipesi (2007), which opened to negative reviews and had a reviewer write that the actor needed "to work on his emotions". His other film in 2007, the triangular love story Nanbanin Kadhali, co-starring Kunal and Shivani Singh, received similar reviews. It had been shot in 2005 under the name Cleopatra and had a delayed release. His most recent theatrical release was Agathiyan's romantic drama Nenjathai Killadhe (2008), where he portrayed a leading role alongside Vikranth and Bharathi.

== Filmography ==
- All films are in Tamil, unless otherwise noted.

Year	Film	Role	Notes
2003	Whistle	Jeeva	
2005	Chinna	Gayathri's husband	
2005	Bambara Kannaley	Gautham	
2006	Manasu Palike Mouna Raagam	Vikram	Telugu film
2007	Tholaipesi	Vedachala	
2007	Nanbanin Kadhali	Jeeva	
2008	Nenjathai Killadhe	Aravind	
