= Bakrid (film) =

2019 Indian drama film

- Release poster
- Directed by: Jagadeesan Subu
- Produced by: MS Murugaraj
- Starring: Vikranth; Vasundhara
- Cinematography: Jagadeesan Subu
- Edited by: Ruben
- Music by: D. Imman
- Production company: M10 Productions
- Release date: 23 August 2019
- Running time: 122 minutes
- Country: India
- Language: Tamil

Bakrid is a 2019 Indian Tamil language drama film written and directed by Jagadeesan Subu. The film stars Vikranth and a camel called Sarah. The film is the first Indian and Tamil film in Kollywood history to portray a camel in the pivotal role. The film was bankrolled by M10 Productions and the music composed by D. Imman. This film received positive reviews.

== Plot ==
Rathinam, a fledgling farmer in Tamil Nadu, accidentally comes into possession of a camel calf. Charmed by the animal, Rathinam decides to keep him as a pet. With time, Rathinam realises that his humble home, despite all the affection showered, might not be the best place for a camel. To ensure the animal lives in his natural setting, he sets out on an unusual road trip to Rajasthan.

== Cast ==
- Vikranth as Rathinam
- Sara as the camel
- Vasundhara as Geetha
- Rohit Pathak as Lorry driver
- Dinesh Prabhakar as Sundaram
- Swaminathan as Manimaran
- Mogli K. Mohan as Lorry driver's assistant
- Pasupathi Raj
- H. L. Shrutika as Vasuki
- Dakshayini as Radha
- Sethupathi Jayachandran as Arul
- Bose Venkat as Police Officer
- M. S. Bhaskar as Veterinarian (guest appearance)
- Vinoddh Bhandarri as Pondicherry saitt

== Production ==
The film was launched in late August 2018 and the shooting of the film commenced on 21 August 2018. The first look poster (which includes Vikranth sitting close to the camel) of the film was unveiled by music director Anirudh Ravichander through his Twitter account. It was reported that Vikranth had signed for the film to play the lead role while he was shooting for his upcoming film, Suttu Pidikka Utharavu. The plot of the film is mainly based on the camel's story, in fact it went onto become the first Indian film to feature camel in a prominent role. This is also the first kind of Indian film to reveal the exploration of the bond shared between a man and a camel. A camel named Sarah from the state of Rajasthan was chosen to cast it in lead role when the shooting took place in Rajasthan. It was revealed that Vikranth had training sessions with the camel for over two months in order to fit for the making of the film. Before the production of the film, the filmmakers received special permission from the Animal Welfare Board to shoot with a camel. The portions of the film were shot in Chennai, Goa, Rajasthan and Maharashtra. Anthony L. Ruben was hired for the editing and the cinematography was handled by the director himself.

== Marketing ==
The official teaser of the film was unveiled on 8 February 2019.

== Soundtrack ==
Bakrid

Soundtrack album by D. Imman
- Released: 17 May 2019
- Recorded: 2018–19
- Studio: D.Imman VGP Studios
- Genre: Film soundtrack
- Length: 32:25
- Label: Star Music
- Producer: D.Imman

D.Imman chronology
Kennedy Club (2019)	Bakrid (2019)	Namma Veettu Pillai (2019)
External audio
- Audio Jukebox on YouTube

The soundtrack of the film is composed by D. Imman, with lyrics by Gnanakaravel and Mani Amuthavan.

Track list
No.	Title	Lyrics	Performer(s)	Length
1.	"Aalankuruvigalaa"	Mani Amuthavan	Sid Sriram	4:06
2.	"Lorry Lucky Lorry"	Gnanakaravel	Ashwin Sharma	4:15
3.	"Karadu Moradu Poove" (Male version)	Gnanakaravel	Narayanan Ravishankar	4:44
4.	"Endless Journe"		Theme Music	1:10
5.	"Karadu Moradu Poove" (Female version)	Gnanakaravel	Punya Selva	4:42
6.	"Aalankuruvigalaa"		Karaoke	4:06
7.	"Karadu Moradu Poove" (Joyful Version)		Karaoke	4:40
8.	"Karadu Moradu Poove" (Sad Version)		Karaoke	4:42
Total length:				32:25
