= Thakka Thakka =

2015 Indian film by Sanjeev

- Poster
- Directed by: Sanjeev
- Written by: Sanjeev
- Starring: Vikranth; Abhinaya; Aravinnd Singh; Parvati Nirban; Aruldoss; Rahul Venkat
- Cinematography: Sujith Sarang
- Edited by: Sreejith Sarang
- Music by: Jakes Bejoy
- Production company: Versatile Studio
- Distributed by: Kalaipuli International
- Release date: 28 August 2015
- Country: India
- Language: Tamil

Thakka Thakka (transl. Attack) is a 2015 Indian Tamil-language action drama film written and directed by Sanjeev, whose elder brother, Vikranth, plays the lead role. The film, earlier titled Piravi, also stars Rahul Venkat, Abhinaya, Leema Babu and Parvati Nirban. It was released by S. Thanu's Kalaipuli International on 28 August 2015. The film was dubbed into Hindi as Phir Se Mafiaraaj.

== Plot ==
The story follows the life of two orphans: Sathya and Karthi. In Sathya's youth, his mother Thulasi was exploited as a sex worker by a man named Bala. After she gives birth to Sathya, he is presumed dead and is buried alive. Thulasi saves him and cares for him until Bala kills her. Sathya meets Karthi and they become friends, working for a restaurant owner named Annachi. Karthi is love with a girl named Indu while her friend Saranya often fights with Sathya. Things go awry when Indu is kidnapped by her uncle and is to be sold along with other girls as a sex slave. Karthi is killed in the process, and Sathya must fight the goons on his own.

== Cast ==
- Vikranth as Sathya
- Abhinaya as Indhu
- Aravinnd Singh as Karthi
- Parvati Nirban as Saranya
- Aruldoss as Bala
- Rahul Venkat as Paraman
- Charle as Indhu's father
- Uma as Sarasu, Indhu's mother
- Bose Venkat as Kasi
- Leema Babu as Thulasi
- Thavasi as Annachi
- Yogi Ram as Kumaru
- Anjana
- Ranjini
- Sarithiran
- Neil
- Kalaikumar
- Master Shashikiran as Young Sathya
- Master Darshan as Young Karthi
- Arya, Vishal and Vishnu Vishal appeared in a promotional song.

== Soundtrack ==
The soundtrack was composed by Jakes Bejoy in his Tamil debut. The album was released by the Saregama label.

Soundtrack listing
#	Title	Performer(s)
1	Thakka Thakka	Haricharan
2	Saaral Mazhai	Saindhavi, Abhay
3	Yaar Ivano	Sanjeevkumar, Jakes Bejoy
4	Thedi Thedi	Jakes Bejoy, Ranjith
5	Yaaro Yaar	Pradeep
6	Egambaney	Ayyadurai
7	Edhum Sollamal	Chinmayi, Haricharan

== Critical reception ==
The Times of India rated the film 3 out of 5 and wrote, "Thakka Thakka is the kind of film that shows spirit even though it doesn't come together as a whole. There are moments that stand out, but the film lacks the tautness in writing that could have made it into a gripping action film". Sudhir Srinivasan of The Hindu wrote, "Thakka Thakka's predictable, wafer-thin plot actually makes even seem like meritorious literary work in comparison." Behindwoods rated the film 2 out of 5 and wrote, "On the whole what promises to be a thrilling action film loses track mid-way." Silverscreen wrote, "Everything about Thaakka Thaaka, from the title, to the posters, to the trailers and promos, made it a point to tell the audience that the film is about action. The filmmakers wanted the film to be 'hard-hitting'. Perhaps they took the term too seriously, because most of the film is full of 'hard-hitting' stunts – punches, throat-slitting, stabbing, and hitting people with long iron rods."
