= Manasu Palike Mouna Raagam =

- Directed by: K. Nagabhushan
- Written by: K Nagabhushan
- Produced by: Dega Deva Kumar Reddy
- Starring: Sneha; Vikramaditya
- Cinematography: Bharani K. Dharan
- Edited by: A. Sreekar Prasad
- Music by: K. M. Radha Krishnan
- Production company: Dega Arts
- Distributed by: Own Release
- Release date: 2 November 2006
- Running time: 136 minutes
- Country: India
- Language: Telugu

Manasu Palike Mouna Raagam (transl. The mind speaks of a silent melody) is a 2006 Indian Telugu-language film produced by Dega Deva Kumar Reddy and directed by K. Nagabhushan starring Sneha and Vikramaditya in his Telugu debut. It is a women-oriented film. It was later dubbed to Tamil in the year 2009 as Yen Indha Mounam. The movie released to negative reviews.

== Plot ==
Gowri (Sneha) was an educated, cultured and beautiful young woman who lives happily along with her father in a village. But due to fate she loses her family in a hurricane and becomes an orphan. Rao (Sarath Babu), friend of her father takes her to his home in town and Gowri starts her new life among the complete strangers. She pretty much does all the work at their home though Chandna, wife of Rao doesn't approve of her much. Uma, Rao's daughter Uma marries Viswa, who later starts flirting with Gowri. When it becomes known to family, Gowri takes all the blame to avoid conflicts between the couple. But Viswa comes out and tells everyone that he was the one who started pursuing Gowri as his marital life wasn't good.

Everybody gets shocked to know that Uma and Viswa are planning to get divorced but Gowri advises marital counselling to avoid all that. To everyone's relief, Uma and Viswa manage their differences with the help of counselling and happily reconcile. Chandana, Rao's wife, gradually grows fond of her. Later their son Vikram (Vikramaditya) comes to visit them from abroad and Gowri gets impressed with him.

Later Rao's couple settles Gowri's marriage somewhere else without asking her consent. She halfheartedly agrees as she sees no interest for her on Vikram's side. But Vikram finds out that groom was a fraud and gets him arrested minutes before the wedding. Gowri becomes happy about that but Vikram still shows no interest for her. His parents arrange a match for him but girl leaves after listening to Vikram's proposal of staying together for some time before marriage. Later he comes to Gowri and tries to get physically intimate with her. She refuses and finally expresses her love for him. Vikram says that he wouldn't believe in all this love nonsense but Gowri explains him the sanctity and selfless nature of love. It impresses Vikram and mainly impresses Chandana who happens to overhear all this conservation. She gives her consent for their marriage and Gowri settles happily as daughter-in-law in that house.

== Cast ==
- Sneha as Gowri
- Vikramaditya as Vikram
- Sarath Babu as Rao
- Ambika as Jyothi
- Aishwarya as Rani
- Ahuti Prasad as Gowri's father
- Raghavayya
- Chandana as Chandana
- L. B. Sriram
- Suman Setty
- Ramesh Khanna
- Pandu
- K. Sivasankar as Priest
- Meenal in a special appearance

== Production ==
The muhurat was held on 1 June 2006. The story of the film is based on Khushbu's comments on premarital sex. Vikramaditya's introduction song was shot at Ramoji Film City. Both Vikramaditya and Sneha has previously starred together in the 2005 Tamil film Chinna, which was directed by Sundar C, Khushbu's spouse.

== Soundtrack ==
The music was composed by K. M. Radha Krishnan. The audio launch was held on 10 September 2006 at Prasad Labs in Hyderabad.

Title	Singer(s)
"Steppu Veyara"	K. M. Radha Krishnan, Gayatri
"Raama Sita"	K. S. Chithra
"Aalapana"	Hariharan, Shreya Ghoshal
"Kotha Pelli Koothuru"	Shreya Ghoshal
"Ningi Nelaki"	K. S. Chithra
"Thelusuko Jeevitham"	Shankar Mahadevan
