= Pokkiri Raja (2016 film) =

2016 Indian film by Ramprakash Rayappa

- Poster
- Directed by: Ramprakash Rayappa
- Written by: S. Gnanagiri (dialogue)
- Screenplay by: Ramprakash Rayappa
- Story by: Ramprakash Rayappa
- Produced by: P. T. Selvakumar(Presenter) T. S. Ponselvi
- Starring: Jiiva; Sibiraj; Hansika Motwani
- Cinematography: Anji
- Edited by: V J Sabu Joseph
- Music by: D. Imman
- Production company: PTS Films International
- Distributed by: Cosmo Village
- Release date: 4 March 2016
- Country: India
- Language: Tamil

Pokkiri Raja (transl. The Rogue King) is a 2016 Indian Tamil-language supernatural comedy film written and directed by Ramprakash Rayappa, starring Jiiva, Sibiraj and Hansika Motwani. This is 25th film of Jiiva. It released on 4 March 2016.

== Plot ==
Sanjeevi is a person with a yawning problem. He got fired from his old job and got dumped by his old girlfriend Sunitha. He joins a job where he meets Raghav. Meanwhile, Sanjeevi meets Sunita but learns a false case from his friend Mojo that she is a drug addict. Eventually, Sanjeevi learns that she is a clean girl who washes people who urinate near walls, and both start loving. On the other hand, a notorious don named "Cooling Glass" Guna was planning to kill someone but gets washed by Sanjeevi and got arrested. When Guna was released, he tried to kill Sanjeevi, but got blind after his sunglass breaks in Sanjeevi's yawn. Sanjeevi went to a doctor and realized that it was the power of his great grandfather Athiyan Ori, a guard of an Indian palace with a power to manipulate wind with his mouth. The British tried to steal treasures but ran from him. He meets a girl in India who came to confess to come with her but gets stabbed. Will Sanjeevi use his powers to destroy Guna forms the crux of the story.

== Cast ==
- Jiiva as Sanjeevi
- Sibiraj as "Cooling Glass" Guna
- Hansika Motwani as Sunitha
- Manobala as Raghav
- Yogi Babu as Mojo
- Ramdoss as Munusu
- Chitra Lakshmanan as Kothandam
- Sujatha Sivakumar as Sanjeevi's mother
- Mayilswamy
- Mottu Kannan Louis as Mottu Kannan
- P. V. Chandramouli as Minister
- Amritha Aiyer as Joshna
- Madhu sri as Nurse showing jetty

== Production ==
The project materialised in June 2015, when it was revealed that Jiiva had accepted to work on a film to be directed by Ramprakash Rayappa, who had previously made Tamizhuku En Ondrai Azhuthavum (2015). Sibiraj also joined the film's cast, while D. Imman was signed as music director, after earlier reports suggested that Harris Jayaraj had been finalised. Jiiva had initially planned to produce the film himself before P. T. Selvakumar came forward to produce the film.

The film began production in September 2015 and Hansika Motwani was finalised to play the leading female role. A first look poster was later released during late October 2015. The satellite rights of the film were sold to Jaya TV.

== Soundtrack ==
The soundtrack was composed by D. Imman.

Track listing
| No. | Title | Lyrics | Singer(s) | Length |
|---|---|---|---|---|
| 1. | "Athuvutta" | Vivek | D. Imman | 4:22 |
| 2. | "Rain Rain Go Go" | Vivek | Neeti Mohan, Varun Parandhaman | 4:11 |
| 3. | "Bubbly Bubbly" | Vivek | Papon, Maria Roe Vincent | 4:08 |
| 4. | "Taaru Taara" | Arunraja Kamaraj | Divya Kumar | 4:06 |
| 5. | "Waltzing Whistle" | | Swetha Suresh | 1:51 |
| 6. | "Athuvutta (Reprise)" | Vivek, MC Rude | Vishal Dadlani, MC Rude | 4:05 |
| Total length: | | | | 22:43 |

== Critical reception ==
Sify wrote "Ramprakash Rayappa’s Pokkiri Raja has a terrific idea at its core and we have to definitely appreciate the director for this gutsy attempt. However, a weak back story and tacky CG work disappoints". M Suganth from The Times of India gave a more positive rating of 3/5 stating that "ultimately, it is such constant stream of laughs in the second half make up for a first half full of yawns." Rediff.com gave it a 1.5/5 calling it "an utter waste of time".
