= Whistle (2003 film) =

- DVD cover
- Directed by: J. D.–Jerry
- Screenplay by: J. D.–Jerry
- Dialogue by: Sujatha
- Story by: J. D.–Jerry
- Based on: Urban Legend
- Produced by: Sujatha
- Starring: Vikramaditya; Gayathri Raguram; Sherin
- Cinematography: Fowzia Fathima
- Edited by: Suresh Urs
- Music by: D. Imman
- Production company: Media Dreams
- Release date: 4 July 2003
- Running time: 153 minutes
- Country: India
- Language: Tamil

Whistle is a 2003 Indian Tamil-language slasher film written and directed by J. D.–Jerry, which is based on the English-language film Urban Legend (1998). The film stars debutant Vikramaditya, Gayathri Raguram and Sherin in the lead roles, alongside Vivek, Dhivyadarshini, Livingston, Bhanu Chander, Mayuri, and Vaishnavi in supporting roles. It is set in a college campus where a series of murders take place.

Whistle was released on 4 July 2003. While the film is primarily based on Urban Legend, Vivek's comedy track is based on Mel Gibson's act in What Women Want (2000).

== Plot ==
SJ Arts and Science college student Swetha gets murdered in her car on a highway. No one has heard from her since. She had a group of friends from her college. It consists of Jeeva (the college magazine editor), Anjali, Bharath, Vinod (the college prankster), Meera (a drug addict), Sharmi (operator at the college radio station), and Maya (the RJ at the radio station). Jeeva is in love with Anjali, whereas Maya has a crush on Jeeva.

The college is famous for the stories of a serial killing entity Naga, dismissed by many as an urban legend. But Professor Panneerselvam (Panneer) still believes it. There is an old laboratory behind the college built alongside the college. But a fire that happened in 1987 killed all the occupants. Since then, the old lab is rumoured to be Naga's private residence. Anjali and Maya have a bet and go to the abandoned place at night and encounter Vinod, who pranks them.

Panneer then lectures the student about Nagamma (Naga). Naga and a British soldier fell in love with each other. Thus, her own brother kills her by burying her alive. A temple was built over it, and the college was built after demolishing the temple. Since then, Naga is rumoured to be murdering people around. Vinod later tries to trick people, but after he gets tricked by black magic, it turns out that he faked it. Yet, Panner is sceptical about it.

Swetha's death comes to light, but it is framed as an accident. Anjali strongly thinks it is no accident as Swetha is an excellent driver. Inspector Syed suspects it must be one of Swetha's father's business rivals. Vinod brings Anjali to an abandoned forest behind the college and tries to make a move on her. Anjali rejects him because she is in love with Jeeva. Soon Vinod is killed by getting hanged. It happens to be Naga, and Anjali freaks out. She runs back to the hostel and brings Baji, the hostel watchman, to the site. But to her horror, Vinod wasn't there, nor was his car. It seems like there was hardly any struggle. Anjali confines in her friends, confused.

No one believes her, as Vinod is known for his pranks. Still sceptical, Anjali gets more confused. In between all these things, Professor Panneer and Jeeva are acting suspiciously. Anjali goes to the library and discovers a book on Naga. She sees some illustrations which are the same as how Vinod died. Maya and Sharmi join her, and they tease her. Sharmi realises that Vinod was the last one to borrow the book, and it is evident he played a prank on Anjali.

That night, Meera gets attacked in her room by Naga. Anjali comes there, and she hears Meera moaning as the killer has covered her mouth. She thinks she is only using drugs. She doesn't switch on the light and leaves to take a shower. When she comes out, Anjali sees Meera dead and screams. Inspector Syed comes there once again to investigate. It is then revealed that Meera had a very depressing life, which is why she got addicted to drugs.

Anjali then moves to Sharmi's room. Later, Jeeva comes with an old magazine about the laboratory fire incident. They both find out that Panneer was the only survivor there. They, together with Maya, break into Panneer's room to have a look. When they hear someone coming, the three hide inside a secret room behind the shelf. They wait patiently for the person to leave. When they hear the doorknob lock, they relax. Suddenly Anjali screams. Jeeva and Maya realise she screamed because of the Naga outfit behind them. They see a mask with snake embroidery, a black cloak, and an axe. Anjali said a similar axe killed Meera, and they suspect Panneer. When they leave the place, Panneer is shown to be there, and he warns them.

Vinod's mother comes to the college and creates chaos when she realises that her son is dead. Frustrated, Jeeva tarnishes Panneer in the college magazine. As a result, the principal suspends Jeeva for one week while a shocking truth about Anjali is told. Anjali has a police record from her school days. When Jeeva asks her, she refuses to tell him. Jeeva starts to doubt her. Later on, he has an argument with Panneer in the bar where they blame each other.

Maya confides in her friends that all the murders that happened and whatever Anjali said were true. It was indeed according to the illustrations in the book. They figure out that the next murder can occur anywhere in the college. Anjali freaks out when a figure looking similar to Naga is seen near a swimming pool where Maya is swimming. But it turns out that it is just a garbage man. When Maya asks her, Anjali reveals that she suspects that the murders might be related to an incident in her school days.

During Anjali's school days, all of them in their group, except for Jeeva and Maya, went to the same school. During the school carnival on their final year, Whistle Day, all of them ragged a junior student named Saravathy "Sara". They then pretended like they took a nude picture of her. Embarrassed, Sara hangs herself in the classroom, much to the others' shock. Due to their age, the six of them get six months. When Anjali finishes, she tells Maya that three of them are dead, and she is scared. Jeeva listens to them and leaves. He has Sara's picture in his book, which raises the suspicion.

Bharath is locked in the men's toilet during the college annual day function. When he is freed, he is killed shortly afterwards. His disappearance starts bothering the group. Soon Panneer is also murdered. Anjali and Maya go to Jeeva's home, discovering Panneer's dead body. When Jeeva finds them, Anjali knocks him down and informs Inspector Syed. They flee the place. When Syed comes there, Jeeva and Panner are not at the site.

Anjali and Maya are confident that Jeeva is the killer. They wait for Sharmi that night, and Sharmi says she saw Jeeva at the Radio Station. But before Anjali and Maya can warn her that Jeeva is the killer, Naga kills Sharmi. They flee the place but get separated. Anjali goes to the burnt laboratory, and there, she discovers Vinod, Panneer and Bharath's dead bodies. She later sees Maya tied to a bed, but Maya wakes up and ties Anjali up.

At the same time, Jeeva and Syed fight, and Jeeva reveals that there are two Nagas, Maya and Baji, who have been committing the murders. Maya tells Anjali that Sara is her younger sister, and their parents died after hearing the news of Sara's death. Baji was their house servant and raised both Maya and Sara when they were young. Both Maya and Baji joined the college to take revenge, and they had to kill Panneer as he found out the truth.

Maya and Baji then plan to bury Anjali alive just like Nagamma. But Jeeva comes and rescues her. Baji is killed, and Syed shoots Maya. Knowing that she is the cause of Sara's death, Anjali cries with remorse. Jeeva comforts Anjali and they both leave together.

Years later, a new group of college students is studying about Naga, but some of them do not believe in Naga's story. When asked who still believes in the story, Maya, who comes to the site, says that she generally does. She also states that all Naga stories begin like this, staring ominously at the sceptical students.

== Cast ==
- Vikramaditya as Jeeva
- Gayathri Raguram as Anjali (Voice dubbed by Deepa Venkat)
- Sherin Shringar as Maya (Naga) (Voice dubbed by (Savitha Reddy)
- Vivek as Sahadevan aka Saga
- Livingston as Professor Panneerselvam (Panneer)
- Bhanu Chander as Police Inspector Sayyad
- Dr. Mathrubootham as Doctor
- Raj Kapoor as Baji (Naga)
- Divyadarshini as Saravathy (Sara), Maya's younger sister
- Manorama as Vinod's mother
- Senthil as College canteen incharge
- Mayilsamy as Sahadevan's friend
- Mayuri as Sharmi, Anjali's friend
- Theni Kunjarammal as Sahadevan's grandmother
- Vaishnavi as Swetha, Anjali's friend
- Manobala as College professor
- Ravikumar as Maya's and Sara's father
- Rathan Mouli as Principal M. Ramamoorthy
- Cheenu Mohan as PT Master
- Sathyendra as Petrol bunk attendant

Uncredited

- Mirchi Shiva as Jeeva's friend
- Premgi Amaren

== Production ==
The director duo J. D.–Jerry said the film's title Whistle is a reference to "Whistle Day", a fictional carnival that features in the narrative, adding that "the rest of the film has an undercurrent of the sequence. Besides, `Whistle' stands for joy and sorrow". Newcomer Vikramaditya, who previously appeared in numerous Hindi-language advertisements and plays, made his feature debut with this film. Whistle is one of the earliest campus thrillers to be made in Tamil.

== Soundtrack ==
The soundtrack was composed by D. Imman. Newcomer Anitha Chandrasekar sang the track "Azhagiya Asura", which became popular.

Track listing
No.	Title	Lyrics	Singer(s)	Length
1.	"Whistle Adikum Vadana"	Na. Muthukumar	Harish Raghavendra, Ganga, Anuradha Sriram	4:56
2.	"Azhagiya Asura"	Thamarai	Anitha Chandrasekar	4:22
3.	"Kiruka Kadal Kirukaa"	Kabilan	Srinivas, Chinmayi Sripada	4:39
4.	"Natpe Natpe 1"	Palani Bharathi	Silambarasan, D. Imman, Aishwarya Rajinikanth, Uma Mahesh, Roopa Venkat	4:52
5.	"Ethnic Texture"	Pulamaipithan	Pushpavanam Kuppusamy, Mathangi	4:33
6.	"Don't Worry Be Happy"	Vaigai Selvan	D. Imman, Srilekha Parthasarathy	3:04
7.	"Thala Thalavethalai"	Palani Bharathi	Manikka Vinayagam, Swarnalatha, Lavanya	4:56
Total length:				31:22

== Release and reception ==
Whistle was released on 4 July 2003. Malathi Rangarajan of The Hindu opined that "Being inspired by foreign flicks is no crime, provided justice is done to the subject borrowed". Malini Mannath from Chennai Online noted that "What counts is that, though they've been largely faithful to the characters, the locations and the situations of the original, they've done a commendable job in the areas where they've re-worked the script". Mister Lee of Kalki praised the director duo for maintaining suspense and called the short flashback and unpredictable climax as lifeline while also praising Imman's score, Sujatha's dialogues and Fowzia's cinematography. Sify wrote, "It is an unusual campus thriller, but in spite of all the lead stars it is Vivek as an old student who steals the thunder, with his comedy track. Vivek has blindly copied Mel Gibson in What Women Want where he can hear what is going through the mind of the woman next to him!".
