= Tholaipesi =

- Poster
- Directed by: K. Paneerselvam
- Written by: K. Paneerselvam
- Starring: Vikramaditya; Priyanka Nair; Divya; Arthi
- Cinematography: D. Shanker
- Edited by: S. Satish
- Music by: S. Shanthakumar
- Production company: Blue Waters Movie Makers
- Release date: 24 August 2007
- Country: India
- Language: Tamil

Tholaipesi (transl. Telephone/talking nuisance) is a 2007 Indian Tamil-language film written and directed by newcomer K. Paneerselvam, starring Vikramaditya, Priyanka, and newcomers Divya and Arthi. The film was released on 24 August 2007.

== Plot ==
The film revolves around Vedachala alias Veda, who continues to lead a playboy life even after his marriage with Anita. Thanks to his cellphone, Anita discovers his illicit affairs with Reema and Arthi. Life takes a turn for Veda. Whether he sets his house in order forms the crux.

== Cast ==
- Vikramaditya as Vedachala
- Priyanka Nair as Anitha
- Divya as Reema
- Arthi as Arthi
- Nizhalgal Ravi
- Karunas
- Lavanya
- Madhan Bob
- Prem

== Production ==
The film marked the directorial debut of Panneerselvam who earlier assisted various directors including Fazil and also penned story for the film Bramma. The film marks the debut of newcomers Divya and Arthi from Mumbai. The film was shot at Chennai, Coutralam, Ooty, Munnar and Pondicherry. The song "Un Manathai" was shot at Kodaikanal.

== Soundtrack ==
Soundtrack was composed by debutant Shanthakumar.

Track listing
No.	Title	Singer(s)	Length
1.	"En Pagaivan"	Saindhavi
2.	"Magic"	Ranjith
3.	"Un Manathai"	Prasanna, Sangeetha
4.	"Enna Venum"	Suchitra
5.	"Nootukku Nooru"	S. P. Balasubrahmanyam

== Critical reception ==
Malini Mannath of Chennai Online wrote, "The debutant director should be commended for trying out a new concept. But the second half could have been trimmed". Priya of Kalki wrote it is inevitable that the audience will get bored even if they try to make the characters interesting, and the film falters due to the lack of plot weight and heavy characters. Climax can be guessed. She said the film's weakness is the lack of compelling scenes.
