= Suttu Pidikka Utharavu =

2019 film by Ramprakash Rayappa

- Theatrical release poster
- Directed by: Ramprakash Rayappa
- Written by: Ramprakash Rayappa
- Produced by: P.K. Ram Mohan
- Starring: Vikranth; Mysskin; Athulya Ravi; Suseenthiran
- Cinematography: Sujith Sarang
- Edited by: G. Ramarao
- Music by: Jakes Bejoy
- Production company: Kalpataru Pictures
- Release date: 14 June 2019
- Running time: 106 minutes
- Country: India
- Language: Tamil

Suttu Pidikka Utharavu (transl. Shoot-at-sight order) is a 2019 Indian Tamil-language action film starring Vikranth and Athulya Ravi in the lead, alongside directors Suseenthiran and Mysskin. The film is written and directed by Ramprakash Rayappa with music composed by Jakes Bejoy, cinematography done by Sujith Sarang, edited by G. Ramarao and produced by P.K. Ram Mohan.

== Plot ==
The film begins with a bunch of criminals, including Ashok (Vikranth) and Selvam (Suseenthiran), looting money from a private bank to save a child's life, and they are on the run. A special team supervised by senior police officer Ibrahim (Mysskin) chases the criminals, who are hiding in a crowded colony. Meanwhile, we are shown that a group of terrorists is also hiding inside the house located in the same colony as they plan a bomb blast in Coimbatore. Then, there is a brave, adventure-loving resident named Bhuvana (Athulya Ravi), who helps the media cover what happens in the colony.

== Cast ==
- Vikranth as Ashok
- Mysskin as Ibrahim
- Suseenthiran as Selvam
- Athulya Ravi as Bhuvana
- Mahima as Thamizhselvi
- Mithun Maheshwaran
- Rajesh Athreyan as Police Officer
- Pillayar Ruthru as Kuberan
- Rajeev K. Prasad as Terrorist
- Sai Krishna as Terrorist
- Ajay KR as Terrorist
- Manasvi Kottachi as Ashok's daughter
- Rithish Kumar as Ashwin
- Guru Ramesh as Thothathri
- Sowmika Pandiyan
- Vipin Mohanan as Sniper

== Production ==
Following director Ramprakash Rayappa’s venture Pokkiri Raja, it was revealed that Ramprakash is all set to direct his third venture that would have Vikranth alongside directors Suseenthiran in his acting debut and Mysskin as the protagonists and this project is to be canned in a short schedule. Recent reports also suggested that this thriller will be shot in Chennai and Coimbatore.

This film commenced shooting in January 2018 after the Pongal festival at Chennai, by then, actress Athulya Ravi was revealed to be playing the female lead. The crew for the film has Sujith Sarang as the cinematographer, Jakes Bejoy as the music composer, and G. Ramarao as the editor. It was also informed that the film will be shot in Chennai and Coimbatore, and the makers are apparently planning to finish shooting work in a single schedule.

== Reception ==
Avinash Ramachandran of Cinema Express gave 3/5 stars and wrote, "While Suttu Pidikka Utharavu might not be ingenious, it is still a reasonable addition to the thriller films that are bombarding Tamil cinema." Thinkal Menon of The Times of India gave 2.5/5 stars and wrote, "Vikranth is OK in his role while director Suseinthiran, who makes his acting debut with the movie, is apt for his character. Mysskin delivers the right body language for an impatient and taut cop whereas Athulya’s character and the scenes which involve her do not make much impact."

== Release ==
The first look was launched by actor Sivakarthikeyan on 20 July 2018, and the teaser was released on 16 August 2018 by actor Dhanush
