= Karkaa Kasadara =

- DVD cover
- Directed by: R. V. Udayakumar
- Written by: V. Homojo (dialogues)
- Story by: R. V. Udayakumar
- Produced by: Thanjai Ravi
- Starring: Vikranth; Lakshmi Rai
- Cinematography: M. Jeevan
- Edited by: D. S. R. Subash
- Music by: Stephen Prayog
- Production company: Smartline Pictures
- Release date: 6 May 2005
- Country: India
- Language: Tamil

Karkaa Kasadara (Tamil pronunciation: [karka kasadara] (Note: The title is from a tirukkuṟaḷ. The additional A in "Karkaa" is not pronounced.) transl. Learn without mistakes) is 2005 Indian Tamil-language romantic action film produced and directed by R. V. Udayakumar. The film stars Vikranth, a former child actor, in his adult debut, and Lakshmi Rai in her debut. The music was composed by Prayog with cinematography by M. Jeevan and editing by D. S. R. Subash. The film was released on 6 May 2005.

== Plot ==
The film begins with Rahul coming from the United States to India to see his grandparents for the first time. He helps a girl who was going to commit suicide due to her upcoming marriage. He also falls in love with Anjali.

== Cast ==
- Vikranth as Rahul
- Lakshmi Rai as Anjali
- Diya as Paaru
- Vadivelu as Ondippuli
- Manorama as Rahul's grandmother
- Seetha as Anjali's sister-in-law
- Jackrase as Annachi Kasi Ayyanar
- Zig Zag German
- Charuhasan as Rahul's grandfather
- Rajeev as Rahul's father (guest appearance)
- Madhan Bob as Settu
- Chelladurai as Pulimoottai
- Robo Shankar as Annachi's henchman
- Supriya Karnik as Rahul's mother (uncredited)

== Production ==
The film marked the debut of Vikranth (previously a child actor) in a grown role, and the debut of Lakshmi Rai, later known as Raai Laxmi.

== Soundtrack ==
Stephen Prayog, who earlier composed for Kannada films, made his debut in Tamil with this film. All the songs were written by R. V. Udayakumar.

Song	Singer(s)
"Minmini"	Sadhana Sargam
"Karka Karka"	Ranjith
"Noothana"	Harish Raghavendra, Chinmayi
"A Joke"	KK, Mahalakshmi Iyer
"Alappuzha"	Grace Karunas
"Aithalakka"	KK, Malathi

== Marketing ==
Old Secret, a brewery brand, was involved in the film's promotion as brand ambassador.

== Critical reception ==
S. R. Ashok Kumar of The Hindu wrote, "The director's forte used to be his absorbing way of story telling, which is completely missing in this film". Malini Mannath of Chennai Online wrote, "With a very loosely etched script, lacklustre narration and weakly defined characters, it looks like the director has totally lost his touch and exhausted all his ideas too". Visual Dasan of Kalki felt Vikranth aped his cousin Vijay in acting and body language while also panning Jack Rase's villainy as over the top and Laxmi Rai's acting but praised Diya's character design but felt Udayakumar changing his style disappointed his fans.
