= Nenjathai Killadhe (2008 film) =

- Title card
- Directed by: Agathiyan
- Written by: Agathiyan
- Starring: Vikranth; Bharathi
- Cinematography: D. Shankar
- Edited by: J. N. Harsha
- Music by: Premji Amaran
- Production company: Blue Waters Movie Makers
- Release date: 14 February 2008
- Running time: 150 minutes
- Country: India
- Language: Tamil

Nenjathai Killadhe (transl. Don't pinch the heart) is a 2008 Indian Tamil-language film written and directed by Agathiyan, starring Vikranth and Bharathi. The music was composed by Premji Amaran, while the lyrics were penned by the director Agathiyan himself and the editing was done by J. N. Harsha. The film was released on Valentine's Day (14 February) of 2008. Mahathi won the Tamil Nadu State Film Award for Best Female Playback Singer.

== Plot ==
A rich boy Vasanth indulges in various bizarre experiments to have different experiences. He eats in a five-star hotel without money, wears a woman's outfit in a showroom, goes to jail just for the sake of it, and hires a sex worker and lets her sleep alone. Meanwhile, Anandhi, the daughter of an NRI, stays alone in the city. She is making a documentary film on people belonging to the fringe world. She meets the prison convicts and sex workers for her documentary. Surprisingly, sparks do not fly when Vasan and Anandhi meet. In fact, she develops a sort of aversion towards his behaviour but is impressed with him when she hears about his experience with the sex worker. Anandhi cannot believe that a boy can behave like this. According to her, the physical proximity would definitely lead to love or sex between a boy and girl. Vasan denies. He and Anandhi challenge each other and set for an experiment. Vasan emerges the winner, while Anandhi is impressed by Vasan's sensitive behaviour and gentle gestures. Anandhi proposes to Vasan, but he refuses to accept her love. When she insists him to accept her, he makes a mockery about her feelings. Anandhi is deeply hurt. She is shocked to see Vasan, who approaches life just as a bunch of experiments to gain varied experiences. She feels cheated and humiliated. Later on, Vasan realises the dormant love within him and comes back to Anandhi, but she is not ready to accept him. She cannot believe that he can get into real love. Her dejection and conviction are too strong to consider his change. Now, Vasan challenges that Anandhi would make her love him, and she accepts the challenge. The emotional game between them leads to an unpredictable climax.

== Cast ==
- Vikranth as Vasanth "Vasan"
- Bharathi as Anandhi
- Vikramaditya as Aravind
- Yugendran as Inspector Meyyappan
- Manivannan as Vasanth's father
- Saranya Ponvannan as Vasanth false mother
- Nizhalgal Ravi as Psychiatrist
- Thalaivasal Vijay as Anandhi's father
- Ganeshkar as Raja Raja Chozhan
- Alex as Waiter

== Production ==
Some of the scenes were shot in a boat house at Allepey, Kerala.

== Soundtrack ==
The soundtrack was composed by Premji Amaran while the lyrics were penned by the director Agathiyan himself.

Track listing
No.	Title	Singer(s)	Length
1.	"Kadhale Nee"	Vijay Yesudas
2.	"Naanga Beer"	Naveen, Ranjith, Premji
3.	"Naane Naana"	Srimadhumitha
4.	"Hello Hello"	Ranjith, Sunitha Sarathy
5.	"Naera Varattuma"	Prasanna, Mahathi
6.	"Oru Manasula"	Haricharan, Chinmayi
7.	"Nenjathai Killathe"	Yugendran, Prashanthini

== Critical reception ==
Malathi Rangarajan of The Hindu wrote, "Ahathiyan could have made his lead characters less loquacious. Be it a story or a character, spontaneity is a prerequisite for it to make an impact. Otherwise the narration could look unnatural as it does in Nenjathai Killadhae". Cinesouth wrote, "Agathiyan has tried to make another 'Kaadhal Kottai.' Because of the dragging screenplay, the love gets punctured". Muthu of Kalki praised the acting, music and direction.
