= Ninaithu Ninaithu Parthen =

- Title card
- Directed by: Manikandan
- Produced by: Babu Raja
- Starring: Vikranth; Ashita
- Cinematography: Madhu Ambat
- Edited by: Kola Bhaskar
- Music by: Joshua Sridhar
- Production company: JJ Good Films
- Release date: 18 May 2007
- Country: India
- Language: Tamil

Ninaithu Ninaithu Parthen (transl. I thought of you, then I saw you) is a 2007 Indian Tamil-language romantic drama film directed by Manikandan. The film stars Vikranth and Ashita, while Karunas and Roja appeared in other pivotal role. The film produced by Babu Raja, had music scored by Joshua Sridhar and told the story of an Indian student who falls in love with a Pakistani girl. The film was released on 18 May 2007.

== Plot ==
This movie is similar to Romeo and Juliet, a tragic love story about two star-crossed lovers. The movie focuses on the love that blossoms between an Indian student and a Pakistani girl. The movie is essentially about how they must both fight against forces which oppose them. The movie outlines some of the most complex themes and problems that occur between the two countries. The story alternates between Adhikesavan's parents searching for him, while the flashback of the incidence are portrayed along the way. Eventually, near the end, the Pakistani girl suicides thinking her lover is going to die. However, Adhikesavan turns up to find her dead. This causes him to break down, eventually psychologically affecting him. As time goes on, Adhikesavan's physical appearance changed to the point where no one recognizes him. The movie ends on a sad note, where his own mother fails to recognize her own son.

== Cast ==
- Vikranth as Adhikesavan
- Ashita as Farzana
- Shankar
- Roja
- Karunas
- Mayilswamy
- Malaysia Vasudevan
- Thalaivasal Vijay
- Ponnambalam
- Raj Kapoor as Varadharajan
- Captain Raju as Mohammed Aslam
- Rajesh
- K. M. Cherian as Doctor (cameo appearance)

== Production ==
The film was named after a song from Selvaraghavan's 7G Rainbow Colony (2004) and marked the directorial debut of Manikandan who earlier assisted Selvaraghavan.

== Soundtrack ==
The soundtrack was composed by Joshua Sridhar. Karthik of Milliblog wrote "Three very listenable tracks from the composer, from whom we continue to expect a bit more!"

- "Naana Yaar Idhu" – Sadhana Sargam
- "Ingivalai" – Goutham, Harini Sudhakar
- "India ithu" - Joshua Sridhar
- "Aandipatti Party" - Sukhwinder Singh, Saindhavi, Haricharan, Premji Amaran
- "Yaar Thandha Saabam" - Haricharan, Harini Sudhakar
- "Theme Music" - Instrumental

== Critical reception ==
Sify labelled it as a "big bore", citing "it is one of the most turgid and regressive movies in recent times. There is no semblance of style or substance and is extremely slow moving, or more importantly lacks a script!". Malini Mannath of Chennai Online wrote, "It's an attempt to strike a different path from the routine fare. And debutant Manikandan (apprenticed with Selvaraghavan) has succeeded to an appreciable extent. The only problem seems to be that he has brought in three angles to the plot: The Indo-Pak rivalry, the desperation of the parents searching for their missing son, and the thwarted romance. And he has a bit of a problem coordinating the three angles and infusing depth in each. Particularly in the episodes of the parents' agony, which fails to touch a chord as their bonding with their son was hardly depicted. But the debutant director's efforts to think differently, and offer a fare different from the routine ones is to be appreciated".

Hema Vijay of Rediff.com wrote "Having crafted an admirable job, debutant director Manigandan, who earlier assisted Selvaraghavan, is someone to watch out for. Handling the story, screenplay and direction, he has managed to present both the social and emotional angle to communal divides without drenching the film in violence". Lajjavathi of Kalki wrote it is okay to introduce difference in many places and give love connection across countries. But even if the film is full of love and feelings, the film would have been heart-wrenching. However, we can expect lot of goods from director Manikandan.
