= Nanbanin Kadhali =

- Directed by: G. Kicha
- Written by: G. Kicha
- Produced by: Dharani, Nanda Raguram
- Starring: Kunal; Vikramaditya; Shivani Singh
- Cinematography: D. Shankar
- Edited by: B. S. Vasu-Saleem
- Music by: Deva
- Production company: Shri Movie Makers
- Release date: 16 March 2007
- Running time: 200 minutes
- Country: India
- Language: Tamil

Nanbanin Kadhali (transl. Friend's lover) is a 2007 Indian Tamil-language romantic drama film written and directed by G. Kicha, starring Kunal, Vikramaditya and Shivani Singh in the lead roles. The film was shot and completed in 2005 under the title Cleopatra, but was released in 2007. The film is inspired by the Telugu film, Nee Premakai. This is Kunal's last film release in Tamil before his death in 2008.

== Cast ==
- Kunal as Suryaprakash (Surya)
- Vikramaditya as Jeeva
- Shivani Singh as Sujatha (Suji)
- Vinu Chakravarthy as Sujatha's father
- Nirosha as Sujatha's mother
- R. Thyagarajan
- Vaiyapuri
- Kalpana Shree

== Production ==
The film began production in 2005 under the title Cleopatra, and filming was held at Goa and Visakhapatnam for 40 days. Even though shooting was completed in 2005, it was delayed for more than a year before finally releasing in early 2007 with its new title Nanbanin Kadhali.

== Soundtrack ==
The music for the film was scored by Deva and lyrics were written by Yugabharathi.

Song	Singers	Length
Aalilla Kattukulla	Karthik, Anuradha Sriram	04:58
Hey Unnai Paartha	Srinivas	04:45
Osthava	Suchitra	06:01
Padava Padava	Mathangi, Prasanna	04:48
Vaazhthu Paada Vanthaen	Harish Raghavendra	05:26

== Reception ==
Chennai Online wrote "The script is a rehash of some earlier films. While the first half is a rehash of 'Mujhse Shadi Karogi?', the second part is clearly inspired by 'Kal Ho Na Ho'. If there is a paucity of story ideas, one doesn't mind the adaptations and rehashes. Only, the director (his third film) could have put in a bit of his own effort too and tried to bring in a freshness in the presentation. 'Nanbanin Kadhali' is a lacklustre affair." Lajjavathi of Kalki wrote Director Kichha, who had thought of an interesting story, could have told it a little more energetically. The film gives a feeling of sagging here and there and concluded saying in the story of friends, the angle is new but the treatment is old.
