= Ramprakash Rayappa =

Indian film director

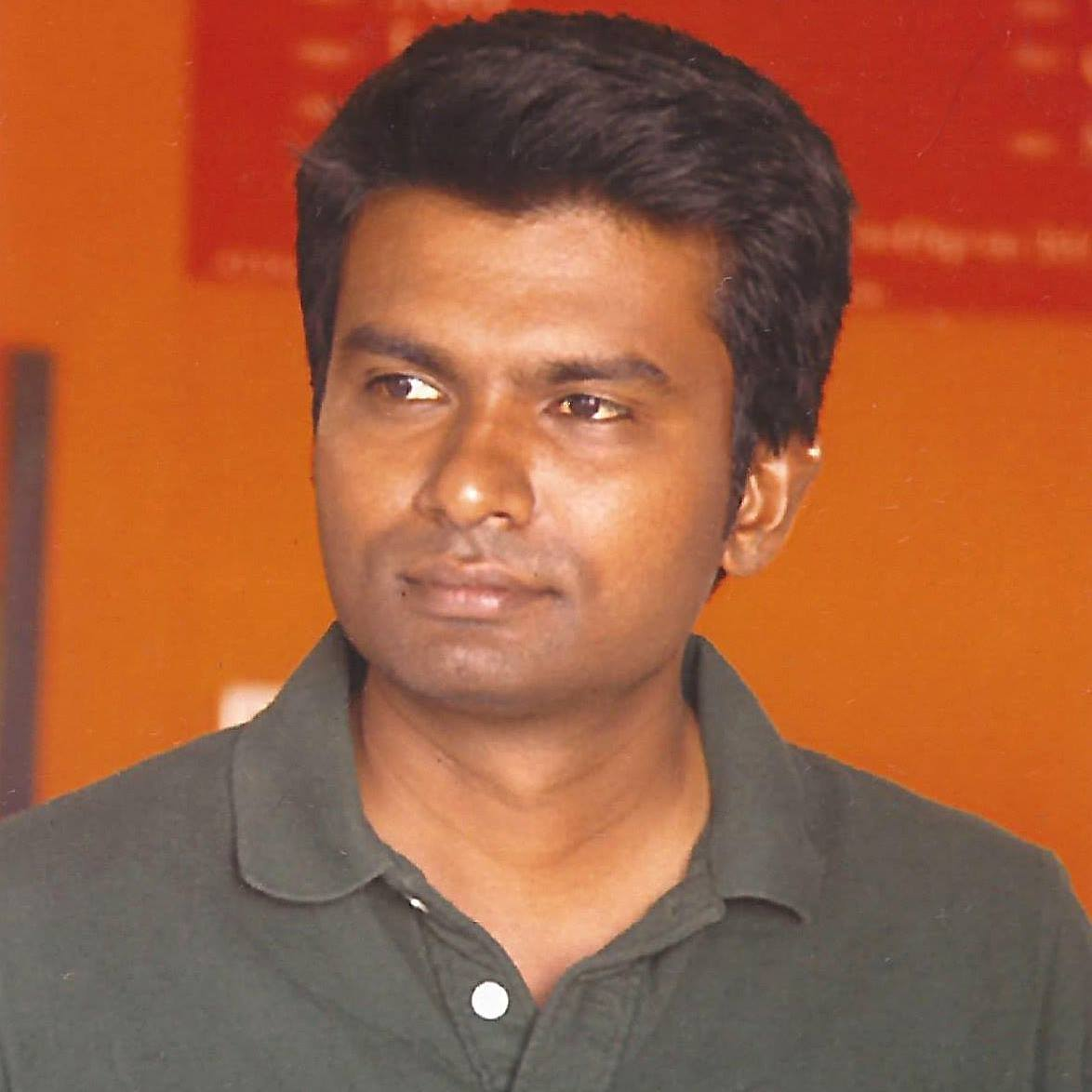
- Ramprakash Rayappa in 2026
- Born: Ramprakash Rayappa; 1 June 1979; Coimbatore, Tamil Nadu, India
- Occupations: Director, Screenwriter
- Years active: 2015 – present
- Spouse: Mathimala
- Children: 1

Ramprakash Rayappa is an Indian film director and screenwriter, who works primarily in Tamil film industry. He worked as an assistant in Engeyum Eppodhum (2011), and made his directorial debut in Tamizhuku En Ondrai Azhuthavum (2015) produced by V.Chandran.

== Filmography ==
- Note: all films are in Tamil, unless otherwise noted.

=== As director ===
Year	Film	Notes	Ref.
2015	Tamizhuku En Ondrai Azhuthavum	Debut film, Nominated, Filmfare Award for Best Director – Tamil	
2016	Pokkiri Raja		
2019	Suttu Pidikka Utharavu		
