= Vaishnavi (Tamil actress) =

Tamil actress

- Born: 2 February 1984
- Died: 17 April 2006 (aged 22); Anna Nagar, Chennai, India

Vaishnavi (2 February 1984 – 17 April 2006) was an Indian television actress. She appeared in several Tamil serials and Tamil films to her credit.

== Career ==
Vaishnavi appeared in the Tamil serials Anni, Muhurtham, and Malargal. She acted in many TV serials and also acted as Sherin's friend in the film Whistle. She was also the video jockey for the comedy programme titled Kondattam on Sun TV which used to be broadcast every Sunday at 3PM.

== Death ==
Vaishnavi apparently committed suicide at the age of 22, at her residence in Chennai on 17 April 2006. On 19 April 2006, Dev Anand (serial actor) was arrested for allegedly abetting Vaishnavi's death. Vaishnavi's parents and her younger sister had been to her grandfather's house to celebrate his birthday, when she was alone at home and hanged herself. Serial actor Dev Anand accused of instigating her to commit suicide.

In November 2011, Dev Anand was sentenced to 5 years imprisonment on charges of abetting the death of Vaishnavi.

== Filmography ==
| Year | Film | Role | Notes |
|---|---|---|---|
| 2001 | Dheena | Vaishnavi | |
| 2001 | 12B | Shakti's sister | |
| 2002 | Baba | Bhuwaneshwari | |
| 2002 | Mounam Pesiyadhe | Sudhakar's girlfriend | |
| 2003 | Kadhal Sadugudu | Suresh's friend | |
| 2003 | Whistle | Shwetha | |

== Television ==
| Year | Serial | Role | Language | Notes |
|---|---|---|---|---|
| 2002 | Anni | Sister | Tamil | Jaya TV |
| 2004-2005 | Manaivi | Neelaveni | Tamil | Sun TV |
| 2005-2006 | Muhurtham | Priya | Tamil | Sun TV |
| 2005-2006 | Malargal | Vidya Ramesh | Tamil | Sun TV |
