= Bambara Kannaley =

- Poster
- Directed by: Parthe Bhaskar
- Written by: Parthe Bhaskar
- Produced by: Senthil-Ganesh
- Starring: Srikanth; Aarthi Agarwal; Namitha
- Cinematography: S. Saravanan
- Edited by: G. Sasikumar
- Music by: Srikanth Deva
- Production company: Annamalai Films
- Release date: 1 November 2005
- Running time: 154 minutes
- Country: India
- Language: Tamil

Bambara Kannaley (transl. With the eyes like spinning top; spelt onscreen as Bambharakannaley) is a 2005 Indian Tamil-language romantic comedy film directed by Parthi Bhaskar. The film stars Srikanth, Aarthi Agarwal and Namitha. Its title is based on a song from Manamagan Thevai (1957).

== Plot ==
Arumugam comes to Ooty for a job and falls in love with Pooja. However, Pooja already has a fiancé Gautham, who isn't as good as he appears to be. What happens to Arumugam's love is the rest of the film.

== Cast ==
- Srikanth as Arumugam
- Aarthi Agarwal as Pooja
- Namitha as Mynaa
- Vadivelu as Kadalai Muthu
- Vikramadithya as Gautham
- Shreekumar as Gunasekar
- Ganja Karuppu
- Singamuthu
- Crane Manohar
- Madhan Bob
- Karate Raja
- Bava Lakshmanan
- Nellai Siva
- Cool Suresh
- Prema Priya

== Production ==
This was Aarthi Agarwal's first and only film in Tamil.

== Soundtrack ==
The music was composed by Srikanth Deva and released by Star Music.

All lyrics are written by Kabilan.

Track listing
| No. | Title | Singer(s) | Length |
|---|---|---|---|
| 1. | "Bambhara Kaanaley" | Udit Narayan, Sadhana Sargam | 5:30 |
| 2. | "En Kaadhalum" | Mukesh Mohamed, Reshmi | 3:04 |
| 3. | "Korukupettai" | Shankar Mahadevan | 5:23 |
| 4. | "Mana Magale" | Mukesh Mohamed, Sriram Parthasarathy, Roshini | 4:36 |
| 5. | "Om Muruga" | Ranjith | 5:39 |
| 6. | "Om Muruga" (version 2) | Srinivas | 5:39 |
| 7. | "Thakadhimi Thakadimi" | Sunitha Sarathy | 3:21 |
| Total length: | | | 33:12 |

== Critical reception ==
Malini Mannath of Chennai Online wrote, "Bambara Kannaley is a love story without much love. Romance is the basis for everything that happens in the film but the romance itself occupies very little of its running time. That by itself is not a bad thing. But the rest of the running time is occupied by things that range from the uninteresting to the outright bad". Lajjavathi of Kalki wrote looking at the fresh approach in several scenes, we can expect aesthetic films from Parthi Bhaskar but panned the climax for wasting reels around 15 minutes. G. Ulaganathan of Deccan Herald wrote, "The director is confused whether he should make it a romantic film or a comedy film. He slips in between the two".
