= Mudhal Kanave =

- Title card
- Directed by: C. Balamurugan
- Written by: C. Balamurugan
- Produced by: Hari Ramakrishnan
- Starring: Vikranth; Honey Rose
- Cinematography: M. D. Venugopal
- Edited by: Suresh Urs
- Music by: Srikanth Deva
- Release date: 20 April 2007
- Running time: 132 minutes
- Country: India
- Language: Tamil

Mudhal Kanave (transl. First dream) is a 2007 Indian Tamil-language romance film directed by C. Balamurugan. The film starred Vikranth and Honey Rose.

== Plot ==
The film begins in Kanyakumari where Hari settles down as painter for his livelihood. He comes across Jennifer and gets attracted by her. A sequence of events reveals that she is a married woman. She is the wife of David in the same village. Hari opens his heart to his employer. A flashback reveals that Hari and Jennifer had been in love for a long time. A sequence of events leaves Jennifer mistaking Hari for no fault of him. She gets married and settles down in Kaniyakumari. Hari is hopeful that he would woo back Jennifer. The rest of the event is all but how Jennifer and Hari get united.

== Cast ==
- Vikranth as Hariharan Prabhu
- Honey Rose as Jennifer
- Santhanam as Sathish Hariharan, Prabhu's friend
- Karunas
- Yugendran as David
- Manivannan as Hariharan, Prabhu's uncle
- Janagaraj as Jennifer's grandfather
- Rajyalakshmi as David's mother
- Vincent Asokan as Lavanya's brother
- Lavanya as Lavanya
- Suja Varunee as special appearance

== Production ==
The film marked the directorial debut of C. Balamurugan, former assistant of K. Bhagyaraj. The film was launched on 2 March 2006 at Prasad Studios.

== Soundtrack ==
All songs were composed by Srikanth Deva and lyrics were written by C. Balamurugan. The audio was launched at Four Frames Theatre at 28 November 2006.

Track listing
No.	Title	Singer(s)	Length
1.	"Aarusamy Ponnu"	Sabesh	5:22
2.	"Beer Venuma"	Shoba Chandrasekhar, Vikranth	5:18
3.	"Mudhal Mudhal"	Mahathi	5:07
4.	"Yaarai Kettu"	Karthik, Kalyani	5:07
5.	"Mudhal Mudhal"	Prasanna Rao	5:07

== Critical reception ==
Malini Mannath of Chennai Online wrote, "The story is all about star-crossed lovers belonging to two different religious backgrounds. But it's commendable that the director doesn't make this an issue for their estrangement. For, what separates them is not religion but a misunderstanding, with Jenny wrongly suspecting Prabhu of seducing her best friend. It was a matter that could have been easily sorted out. But the director prefers to drag the story through many dreary episodes, till he feels it's time to bring it to a finale". Indiareel wrote, "Major highlights of the movie are the dialogues of Balamurugan and the cinematography of M D Vijaya Gopal. Srikanth Deva's music is laudable".
