= Chinna (2005 film) =

- Poster
- Directed by: Sundar C
- Written by: Sundar C
- Produced by: Sreenivasa Raju
- Starring: Arjun; Sneha
- Cinematography: Prasad Murella
- Edited by: Kasi Viswanathan
- Music by: D. Imman
- Production company: Sri Sri Chitra
- Release date: 15 July 2005
- Running time: 150 minutes
- Country: India
- Language: Tamil

Chinna (transl. Little) is a 2005 Indian Tamil-language romantic thriller film written and directed by Sundar C and produced by Sreenivasa Raju. The film stars Arjun and Sneha in lead roles. The music was composed by D. Imman with cinematography by Prasad Murella and editing by Kasi Viswanathan. The film was released on 15 July 2005.

== Plot ==
The film begins with Gayathri marrying an irrigation engineer against her wishes. As she goes through with her marriage on autopilot, her sunken heart reflects on her past.

Gayathri, a marine student, goes to Rameswaram to study coral reefs and marine ecosystems while staying with her uncle and cousin in a fisherman hamlet. There, she witnesses Chinna and his assistants – local mobsters working for a gang – committing violent crimes. Though she wanted to report these crimes to the local SP, her uncle and cousin dissuade her. Meanwhile, she asks her uncle for a guide to take her to places rich in marine life. Her uncle asks Chinna to help Gayathri in her pursuit. After some close encounters with Chinna, Gayathri understands his soft, childlike nature and vows to reform him into a socially acceptable man. Later, love blossoms between them. Even as Chinna tries to straighten his ways, a violent feud ensues between him and the local gang. Trying to save Gayathri, Chinna kills the gang leader and is sentenced to life imprisonment. Taking advantage of Chinna's absence, Gayathri's parents marry her to the irrigation engineer.

As the flashback ends, the story ploughs through the second half, where Chinna, obsessed with "Gayathri", kills people working against his goal to attain his lady love. In the end, after much drama, when Chinna almost kills Gayathri's husband, Gayathri shoots him to save her husband. Chinna asks Gayathri if she had feelings for him for even just a second. Just after she nods yes, he jumps off the building. The movie ends there, indicating his death.

== Cast ==
- Arjun as Chinna
- Sneha as Gayathri
- Vijayakumar as Gayathri's uncle and ex-police officer
- Vikramaditya as Gayathri's husband
- Rajesh
- Vadivelu as Kumar
- Livingston as Police Officer
- Mansoor Ali Khan as Chinna's friend
- Ponnambalam as Chinna's friend
- Manivannan as Sabapathy
- Vinu Chakravarthy as Gayathri's uncle
- Jayaprakash Reddy as Chinna's ex-boss
- Shreekumar as Soosai
- Aarthi as Maha
- M. S. Bhaskar as Gopalan
- Madhan Bob
- Riyaz Khan
- Besant Ravi
- Kiran Rathod, Special appearance in an item number Song

== Production ==
The film saw Sundar and Arjun collaborating for second time after Giri (2004). Filming began on 17 January 2005 and was held at Rameshwaram, Dhanushkodi and Pamban.

== Soundtrack ==
The music was composed by D. Imman.

Track listing
No.	Title	Lyrics	Singer(s)	Length
1.	"Bailare Bailare"	Pa. Vijay	Sunitha Sarathy
2.	"Kaalangathala"	Palani Bharathi	KK, Anuradha Sriram
3.	"Osthara Pilusthunara"	Ceylon Manohar	Karthik, Devan, Ranjith
4.	"Tholaidhoora Nilave"	Pa. Vijay	D. Imman
5.	"Yaar Yaaro"	Palani Bharathi	S. P. Balasubrahmanyam

== Reception ==
Malini Mannath of Chennai Online wrote, "Arjun, expectedly, does his fights and stunts with flair, his intense grim look suiting the role well. It's when the story moves into the second half that the director falters". Malathi Rangarajan of The Hindu wrote, "The first aspect that strikes one as odd is the number of climaxes that stretch the length of the film beyond a point of endurance. With better control over the script, the narration would have been more interesting". Visual Dasan of Kalki wrote Sundar made a masala out of mixing Gunaa and Kadhal Konden in second half, praised Sneha's acting and Sundar for casting antagonists Mansoor Ali Khan and Ponnambalam in humorous characters and concluded saying is it possible to make a new film on age old plot just for the screenplay which never stumbles. G. Ulaganathan of Deccan Herald wrote "There is a lot of drama and good performances from the lead pair, but the movie lacks depth". Sify wrote "What do you normally expect in a Sundar.C movie? Action, comedy, hot item numbers, barely clad heroines, and racy narration are his forte. But unfortunately, Chinna lacks some of these elements notably comedy as the director tries to make a morbid drama of an obsessive lover that moves at lethargic pace". Regarding the Telugu dubbed version Koti, a critic from Telugucinema.com wrote that "it is pucca [pakka] Tamil film – typical Tamil films’ clichés like a street song, silly comedy, and excessive melodrama. It hardly impresses".
