= Tamizhuku En Ondrai Azhuthavum =

2015 Indian film by Ramprakash Rayappa

- Theatrical release poster
- Directed by: Ramprakash Rayappa
- Written by: R. Senthil Kumar (dialogue)
- Screenplay by: Ramprakash Rayappa
- Story by: Ramprakash Rayappa
- Produced by: V. Chandran
- Starring: Nakul; Dinesh; Aishwarya Dutta; Bindu Madhavi
- Cinematography: Deepak Kumar Padhy
- Edited by: V J Sabu Joseph
- Music by: S. Thaman
- Production company: VLS Rock Cinema
- Distributed by: Red Giant Movies
- Release date: 20 February 2015
- Running time: 144 minutes
- Country: India
- Language: Tamil

Tamizhuku En Ondrai Azhuthavum (transl. Dial 1 for Tamil; also referred to as TEOA) is a 2015 Indian Tamil-language hyperlink thriller film written and directed by Ramprakash Rayappa. Produced by V. Chandran, the film stars Nakul, Dinesh, Bindu Madhavi and Aishwarya Dutta. It was released on 20 February 2015.

== Plot ==
A deadly bomb will be activated if a computer geek restores a part of Chennai city's mobile networks, which are down due to a solar flare. Four people are linked to each other on a deadly mission.

Mukil falls in love with Simi, who is stuck in a pit hole with an 80-tonne gigantic 'Vaasthu' rock under suspension which is ready to fall on her at any time. The only way that Simi can escape from this danger is if her text message reaches Mukil.

In the meantime, there is a hyperactive science geek Vasanth, who is on a mission to activate a dead mobile network signal. Vasanth loves a girl named Harini. There is a call taxi driver Raja, whose car has a remotely operated bomb planted in it by a terrorist outfit waiting to destroy the city once the phone lines are restored. Does the city escape destruction from the bomb and what happens with the four main characters forms the rest of the story.

== Cast ==
- Nakul as Vasanth
- Dinesh as Mukil
- Bindu Madhavi as Simi
- Aishwarya Dutta as Harini
- Urvashi as Vasanth's mother
- Manobala as Swaminathan
- Sathish as Raja
- Md Asif as Bunty
- Ajay as Ramesh
- Baby Roshini as Shruti
- Sundari Divya as Lavanya
- Shalu Shamu as Maha
- Balachandar as Sanjay
- A. Srepaty Parvatraj as Seenu
- Pradeep K Vijayan as Veerasena
- Vanaraj as cameraman
- Parotta Murukesh as Maha's father
- Subhashini Kannan as Vasanth's sister-in-law

== Production ==
The film began development in October 2013. Production began that December, and the team held a series of workshops to help the actors get into character, before beginning filming in Tiruvottiyur.

== Soundtrack ==
Tamizhuku En Ondrai Azhuthavum

Soundtrack album by S. Thaman
- Released: 2014
- Genre: Feature film soundtrack
- Length: 20:30
- Language: Tamil

S. Thaman chronology
Vanmam (2014)	Tamizhuku En Ondrai Azhuthavum (2014)	Beeruva (2014)

The soundtrack was composed by S. Thaman.

Track listing
No.	Title	Lyrics	Singer(s)	Length
1.	"Sattunnu Enna"	Yugabharathi	Hariharasudhan	3:28
2.	"Robo Romeo"	Madhan Karky	M. M. Manasi, M. M. Monisha	5:01
3.	"Thamizhukku En Ondrai Azhuthavum"	Madhan Karky	Alphons Joseph	3:35
4.	"Robo Romeo" (Karaoke)	Madhan Karky	Instrumental	5:00
5.	"Sattunnu Enna" (Karaoke)	Yugabharathi	Instrumental	3:26
Total length:				20:30

== Critical reception ==
M. Suganth of The Times of India's gave the film 3.5 stars out of 5 and wrote, "Ramprakash Rayappa sets up his story effectively and keeps us on the edge of our seats for the most parts. The manner in which he handles this multi-strand narrative without making it chaotic deserves appreciation. The success lies in how he makes each of these sub-plots interesting", going on to call it a "solid debut film". Indo-Asian News Service, while giving the same rating and also describing it as a "solid social thriller", wrote, "(the) details, though minute, make the director stand out from his contemporaries. The writing is fresh and it’s evident from the way the director manages to make the parallelly running stories converge at the end...It’s probably the first Tamil film where a perfect balance is struck between science, romance and comedy interspersed with some fresh thrills". The New Indian Express wrote, "The deftness and confidence with which the director moves his narration belies the fact that this is his debut venture. The screenplay is engaging, with the characters well-fleshed out, and there is an element of suspense with humour laced throughout...One of the better scripts to appear in recent times, Thamizhuku Enn Ondrai Azhuthavum has a lot of positives going for it".

Sify wrote, "The director has done his paper work with sheer perfection and packaged this out-of-the-box concept in a fairly engaging manner". Baradwaj Rangan from The Hindu wrote, "It doesn’t say much about a movie when we walk into a thriller and walk out of what’s mostly a comedy – but with so many laughs, why complain?", further adding that "first-time director Ramprakash Rayappa at least has the right ideas". In contrast, Rediff gave the film 2 stars out of 5 and wrote, "Director Ramprakash has come up with a good idea, but the performance is poor, the romance seems forced, there are too many coincidences and a lame, predictable climax. This spoils what could have been a racy and exciting thriller".
