= Vikranth =

Indian actor (born 1984)

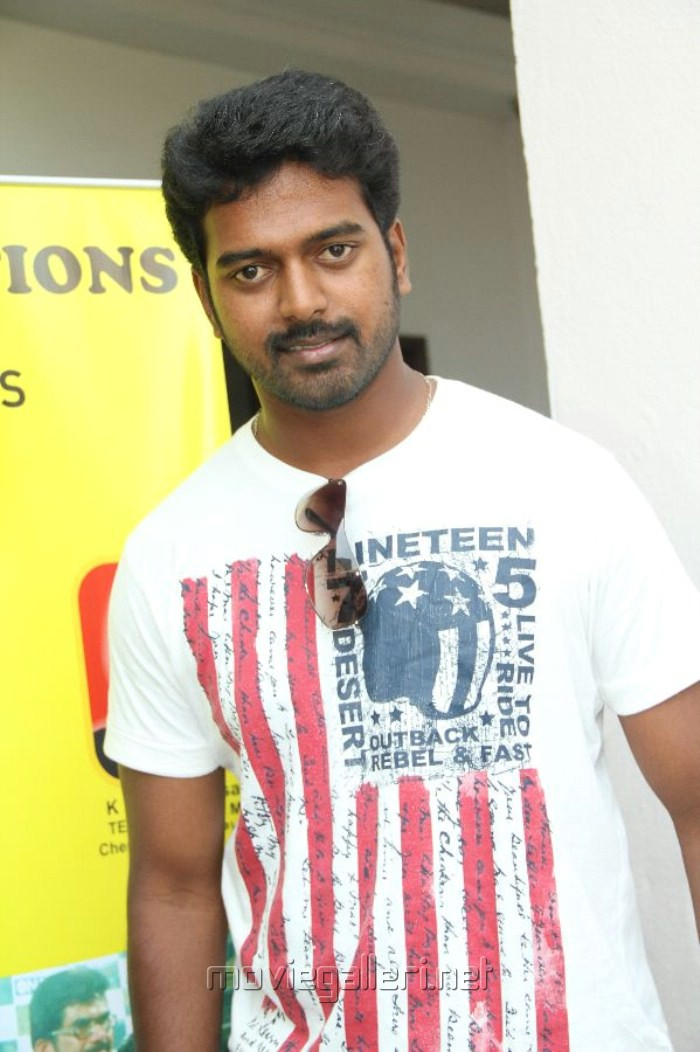
- Vikranth in 2013
- Born: Santhosh; 13 November 1984 (age 41); Chennai, Tamil Nadu, India
- Years active: 1991; 2005–present
- Spouse: Maanasa Hemachandran (m. 2009)
- Children: 2
- Relatives: Vijay (cousin); S. A. Chandrasekhar (uncle)

Vikranth Santhosh (born 13 November 1984) is an Indian actor who has appeared in Tamil language films. He was introduced in the film Karka Kasadara (2005) directed by R. V. Udayakumar and later appeared in other romantic drama films. Following his participation in the Celebrity Cricket League, Vikranth has moved on to work in bigger film projects.

== Career ==
Vikranth began his career as a child actor in Azhagan (1991). After pursuing Visual Communication in Loyola College, he made his lead acting debut with R. V. Udayakumar's Karka Kasadara (2005), before appearing as the lead actor in other small budget films such as Ninaithu Ninaithu Parthen (2007), Mudhal Kanave (2007) and Agathiyan's Nenjathai Killathe (2008). Vikranth then appeared alongside Vijayakanth in Engal Aasan (2009) and collaborated with Rasu Madhuravan twice in quick succession, with Goripalayam (2010) and Muthukku Muthaaga (2011), portraying a negative character in the former. His contributions as a cricketer in the Celebrity Cricket League Vikranth's profile in the early 2010s and he began to work on more prominent films. He acted with Sathyaraj in Sattapadi Kutram (2011) directed by his uncle S. A. Chandrasekhar.

He had a cameo in Suseenthiran's Pandianadu, where he portrayed Vishal's friend who gets slain. Vikranth's following film Thakka Thakka (2015), directed by his brother Sanjeev, became the actor's widest solo release, with actors Vishal, Arya and Vishnu appearing in a promotional song for the film. Vikranth then signed on to portray the main antagonist in Udhayanidhi Stalin's Gethu (2016), appearing as a sniper with only one line of dialogue throughout the film.

In 2017, he appeared in Kavan directed by K. V. Anand. He portrayed a supporting role where Vijay Sethupathi acted in the lead role. Filmtimes describes it; Vikranth is engaging and memorable. The movie was a commercial success. The next movie was Samuthirakani's Thondan (2017) where Vikranth gets to play a pivotal role which he has performed with ease and élan. In the Suseenthiran's bilingual film, Nenjil Thunivirundhal (C/o Surya in Telugu) (2017), starring Sundeep Kishan and Vikranth, has not been receiving great reviews by critics. In 2019, his films were Suttu Pidikka Utharavu, Vennila Kabaddi Kuzhu 2 and Bakrid.

In 2022, he playing the role of Satan, a cold-blooded criminal in the film Naan Mirugamaai Maara. He co-starring with Vishnu Vishal in the sport action film Lal Salaam (2024). He then played in lead role in the drama film Deepavali Bonus (2024).

== Personal life ==
His mom Sheela acted in Pandian Stores. His brother Sanjeev directed him in Thakka Thakka (2015). Earlier, Sanjeev had also worked as an actor, working on an incomplete film titled Beauty opposite Abhinayashree. He is the cousin of popular Tamil actor and current Tamil Nadu chief minister Vijay and nephew of Shoba and S. A. Chandrasekhar. He married actress Manasa Hemachandran, who is the daughter of late cinematographer Hemachandran and actress Kanakadurga, on 21 October 2009 in Chennai. His son was born on 23 July 2010. His second son was born in March 2016.

== Filmography ==
- All films are in Tamil, unless otherwise noted.

List of films and roles
Year	Film	Role	Notes
1991	Azhagan	Azhagappan's son	Child artist
1991	Eashwari	Kannan	Child artist
2005	Karka Kasadara	Rahul	
2007	Ninaithu Ninaithu Parthen	Adhikesavan	
2007	Mudhal Kanave	Hariharan Prabhu	Also playback singer
2008	Nenjathai Killathe	Vasanth	
2009	Engal Aasan	Vasu	
2010	Goripalayam	Paandi	
2011	Muthukku Muthaaga	Bose	
2011	Sattapadi Kutram	Thangaraj	
2013	Pandianadu	Sethu	Special appearance
2015	Thakka Thakka	Sathya	
2016	Gethu	Craig (Bull)	
2017	Kavan	Abdul Kader	
2017	Thondan	Vicky	
2017	Nenjil Thunivirundhal	Mahesh	Simultaneously shot in Telugu as C/o Surya
2019	Suttu Pidikka Utharavu	Ashok	
2019	Vennila Kabaddi Kuzhu 2	Saravanan	
2019	Bakrid	Rathinam	
2022	Naan Mirugamaai Maara	Satan	
2024	Lal Salaam	Shamsuddin	
2024	Deepavali Bonus	Ravi	
2025	Bun Butter Jam	Selva	Special appearance
2025	Madharaasi	Sandeep	
2025	Will	Palani Vel Murugan	Special appearance
2025	Mark	Rudhra	Kannada film

=== Television ===
Year	Show	Role	Channel
2021	Survivor Tamil	Participant	Zee Tamil
2026	LBW: Love Beyond Wicket	Rangan	JioHotstar
