= Ranjith (singer) =

Indian singer (born 1977)

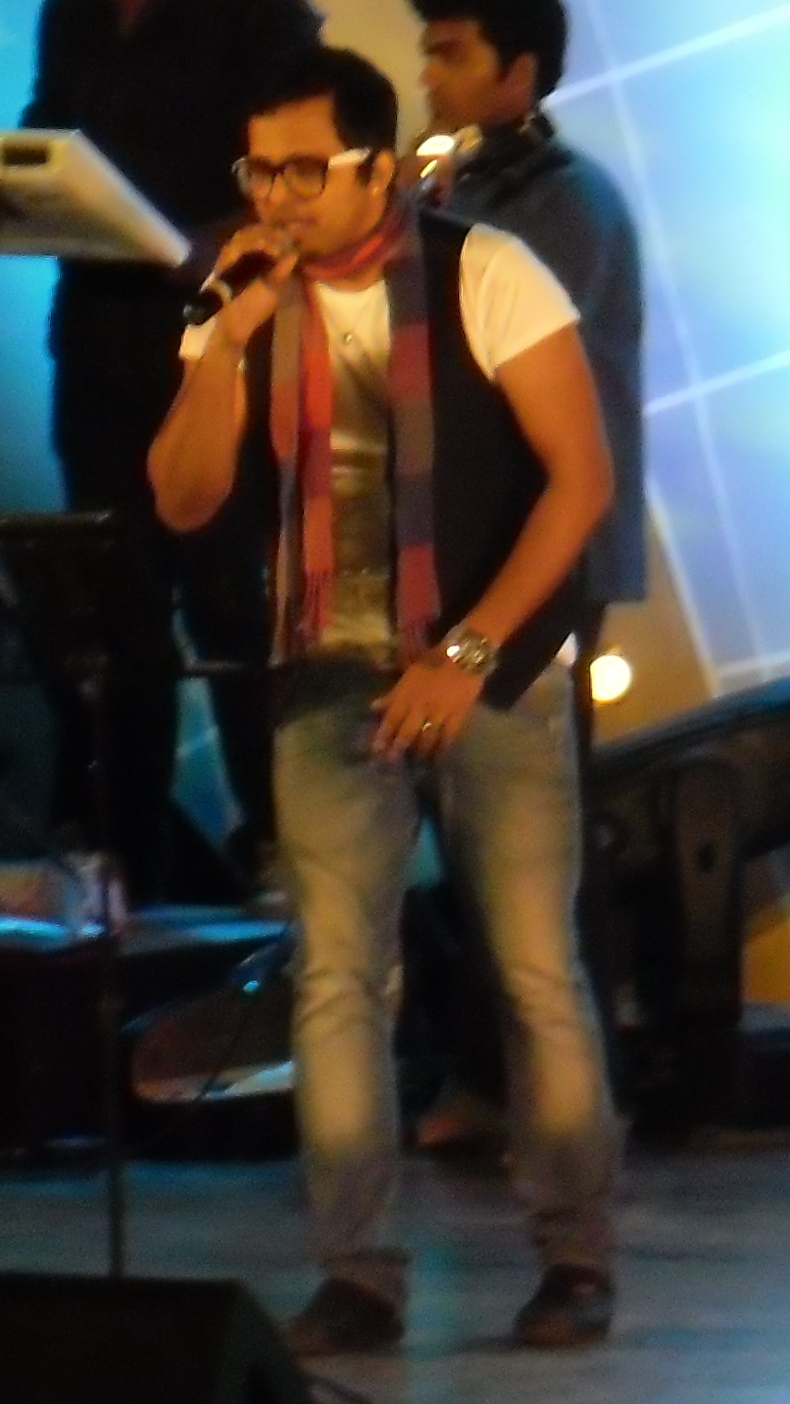
- Ranjith performing at Sangarsh

Background information
- Born: Kolankara Govindankutty Ranjith; 21 February 1977 (age 49); Kannur, Kerala, India
- Occupations: Singer; composer
- Years active: 2002–present

Kolankara Govindankutty Ranjith (born 21 February 1977) is an Indian playback singer, working in the Tamil, Telugu, Malayalam and Kannada film industries and has sung more than 2500 songs.

== Early life ==
Ranjith was born in Chennai, India into a Malayali family, hailing from Kalluvazhi, Kerala. He grew up listening to various kinds of music. He used to stay in a locality where there were many Keralites, and had a chance to participate in the local programs there. Later, a family friend suggested that he be trained in classical music. He learned Hindustani music and Carnatic music. He was trained by Vidwan Cuddalore Subramanian, K. S. Kanakasingam, Trichur P. Ramankutty and P. S. Narayana Swamy. He became popular when he won the Sun TV Saptha Swarangal singing contest in 2001. He is married to a trained Bharata Naatiyam dancer, Reshmi Menon. He has a daughter and a son.

== Career ==
Mani Sharma introduced Ranjith as a playback singer, calling him to sing the song "Adugu Adugu" for the Telugu film Bobby (2002) alongside accomplished singer, Hariharan. Ranjith's first Tamil song was "Hey Penne" from Aasai Aasaiyai (2002), also composed by Mani Sharma. However, the song which gained Ranjith popularity was "Suppose" from the film Sukran (2005). In 2007, he sang his first song in his mother tongue Malayalam, "Innoru Paattonnu Paadaan" for the film Kilukkam Kilukilukkam. Ranjith was nominated for the Best Male Playback Singer prize in the Telugu category at the 56th Filmfare Awards South for the song "Entavaraku" from Gamyam (2009).

In 2005, Ranjith composed, arranged and performed an ensemble of Ayyappa Namaskara Slokas that was compiled into an album titled Saranam Ayyappa. He further composed and arranged the music for the dance ensemble Panchamukhi. He has worked often with Yuvan Shankar Raja, Vidyasagar and other music directors in Tamil.

== Songs ==
=== Tamil songs ===
Song	Film	Co-singers	Year	Composer
Hey Penne	Aasai Aasaiyai		2003	Mani Sharma
Iiamai Embathu	Aasai Aasaiyai	Ravimariya, Tippu	2003	
Kanam Sivaka	Aasai Aasaiyai	Mahalakshmi Iyer	2003	
Ye Penney	Aasai Aasaiyai		2003	
Hey Sembaruthi	Eera Nilam	Anuradha Sriram	2003	
Megam Karukudhu	Eera Nilam	Ganga	2003	
Appappa	Ice	Anupama Deshpande, Kalpana	2003	
Yendi	Alaudin		2003	
Panchu Mala Panchu Mala	Banda Paramasivam	Sujatha	2003	
Chella Kiliyo	Chellame	Anuradha Sriram	2004	
Chinna Roja Kondu	Kavithai	Ganga	2004	
Oru Kottaikkul	Kudaikul Mazhai	Antriya, Sujatha	2004	
Vattakkarupatti	Neranja Manasu	Aishwarya	2004	
Naatu Sarakku	Pudhukottayilirundhu Saravanan	Dhanush, Lavanya	2004	
Pudhu Kadhal	Pudhukottayilirundhu Saravanan	Chinmayi	2004	
Pidivatham Pidikathae	Jananam	Magathi	2004	
Soodaamani	Arul	Shalini	2004	Harris Jayaraj
Seithi Suda Suda	Vaanam Vasappadum		2004	
Tamil Theriyum	Vanakkam Thalaiva	Gayathri	2005	
Unnalae Thoogam	Athu Oru Kanaa Kaalam	Malathi	2005	Ilayaraja
Ennada Nenacha	Athu Oru Kanaa Kaalam	Vijay Yesudas	2005	Ilayaraja
Puthusa Nenachikittu	Chidambarathil Oru Appasamy	Tippu	2005	
Osthara Pilisthunara	Chinna	Devan, Karthik	2005	
Uchanthalayil	Ayul Regai	Sriram	2005	
Mama Paiya	Devathayai Kanden		2005	
Solvaaya Solvaaya	Girivalam	Harini	2005	
Adiyae Aandaal Amma	Girivalam	Anuradha Sriram	2005	
Naan Thaan Kadavulada	Jithan		2005	
Karka Kasadara	Karka Kasadara		2005	
Yela Yela	Arinthum Ariyamalum		2005	
Mayavi Mayavi	Mayavi	Chitra, Devi Sri Prasad	2005	
Pangu Podu	Oru Kalluriyin Kadhai	Kay Kay	2005	
Manidhan Solkindra	Raam	Vijay Yesudas, Yuvan Shankar Raja	2005	
Gumthalakkadi Gana	Sandakozhi		2005	
Suppose	Sukran	R Vinaya	2005	
Om Muruga	Bambara Kannaley		2005	
Dole Dole Than	Pokkiri	Suchitra	2006	
Nee Mutham Ondru	Pokkiri	Shweta Mohan	2006	
Nee Mutham Ondru" (Remix)	Pokkiri	Suchitra	2006	
Yaro Yevalo	Rendu		2006	
Haiyaiyo	Kadhale En Kadhale	Prayog, Timmy	2006	
Pattam Poochi	Chithiram Pesuthadi	Timmy	2006	
Uyir Priyum	Kalvanin Kadhali		2006	
Aadhivasi Naane	Kedi	Shreya Ghosal	2006	
Kunguma Poovae	Kedi	Chinmayi	2006	
Masala Maharani	Kusthi	Priyadarshini, Ranjith	2006	
Dum Irundha Munnaley Vaa	Madhu	Karthik, Naveen	2006	
Immathundhu Manasu	Madhu	Malathi	2006	
Aarai Adi	Naalai	Rita, Tippu	2006	
Idhu Maaya	Naalai	Malgudi Subha, Tippu	2006	
Roatu Mela	Oru Kadhal Seiveer	Malathy Lakshman	2006	
Geetha Mala	Oru Kadhal Seiveer	Devan, Sounder Rajan	2006	
Kangal Kandadhu1	Oru Kadhal Seiveer	Ganga	2006	
Yedho Nadakuthu	Parijatham	Karthika	2006	
Azhaghana Poigale	Poi		2006	
Varriya	Pudhupettai	Narayan, Naveen	2006	
Khadal Keedal	Saravana	Reshmi, Simbhu	2006	
Marappu Potta	Prathi Gnayiru 9 Manimudhal 10.30 Varai		2006	
Enjoy	Chennai Kadhal	Blazee	2006	
Kala	E	Kalpana, Sowmya	2006	
Yaar Kadavulai	Ilavattam		2006	
Pana	Jambhavan	Janani	2006	
Punagaye	Nenjil Jil Jil		2006	
Patchi	Thirudi	Suchitra	2006	
Ennamma Kannu	Thiruvilaiyaadal Aarambam	Karthik	2006	
Theriyaama	Thiruvilaiyaadal Aarambam	Sujatha	2006	
Kaatru	Dhandayuthapani		2007	
Mylapooru	En Uyirinum Melana	Grace	2007	
Sight Adicha	Thullal	Aishwarya	2007	
Maiyaie	Ippadikku Kadhaludan Seenu (D)		2007	
Karuppaana Kaiyale	Thaamirabharani	Chorus, Roshini	2007	
Om Ennum	Sabari	Naveen, Rahul Nambiyar	2007	
Osama Osama	Sabari	Naveen, Ramanan A V	2007	
Thalai Suthuthae Maami	Muni		2007	
Jillendra	Aarya	Rita	2007	
Malai Year Pogudhu	Gaja	Ganga	2007	
Adakkivasi Adakkivasi	Maamadurai	Michael Fenando, Reshmi	2007	
Neruppum	Sivi	Sunitha Sarathy	2007	
Rap Theme	Sivi	Bob, Subhiksha	2007	
Magic Magic	Tholaipesi		2007	
Uyire Uyiree	Malaikottai		2007	
Vegam Vega	Vegam	Rajesh Vaidya, Haricharan	2007	
Hey Mama Mama	Oru Ponnu Oru Paiyan		2007	
Yaedho Senja	Rameshwaram	Chinmayee	2007	
Needhaana Needhaana	Sadhu Miranda	Swetha	2008	
Enge Nee	Pidichirukku	Abhijith Savanth, Mano, Lakshmi Roosal	2008	
Senthamizh Pesum Azhagu Juliet	Santosh Subramaniam	Andrea	2008	
Vuthattoram	Iyakkam	Swarnalatha, Malathi	2008	
Adaleru-Theme	Arasangam	Mega	2008	
Ummachi	Newtonin Moondram Vidhi	Shalini	2008	
Hello Hello Cell Phone	Nenjathai Killathe	Sunitha Swarthy	2008	
Kannukotta	Malarinum Melliya	Roshini	2008	
Parthen Oru Nilavai	Pandhayam		2008	
Kaase	Netru Indri Naalai	Nithiin	2008	
Oru Naalo Oru Polutho	Netru Indri Naalai	Harshika	2008	
Krishna Krishna	Alibhabha	Sevea	2008	
Puthiya Parava Ondru	Alibhabha	Sujatha	2008	
Kathal Sammatham	Kee Mu	Hema Ambika	2008	
Indha Payanathil – Male	Poi Solla Porom		2008	
Thirumbi Pogave	Ennai Theriyuma? (D)	Naveen	2009	
Ilamaiyin Vaasanai Mudhal	Madhavi	Anuradha Sriram	2009	
Alaipayudhey	Guru En Aalu	Karthik, Nrithya	2009	
Nee Oru	Nesi	Anuradha Sriram	2009	
Mannu Nee	Sindhanai Sei		2009	
Juram	Kadhalna Summa Illai	Anuradha Sriram	2009	
One Way	Kadhalna Summa Illai	Noel	2009	
Orampo Orampo	Ainthaam Padai	Arjith, Karthikeyan	2009	
Ennil Nooru Maatram	Pattalam	Shalini Singh	2009	
I Phone	TN 07 AL 4777	Sangeetha Rajeshwaran	2009	
Oru Paarvaiyil	Siva Manasula Sakthi		2009	
Maama Maama	Oru Kadhalan Oru Kadhali	Gayathri	2009	
Kalavaaniye	Mayandi Kudumbathar	Madhumitha	2009	
Doctor Mapillai Okya	Thiru Thiru Thuru Thuru	Naveen	2009	
Thiru Thiru Thuru Thuru Theme Song	Thiru Thiru Thuru Thuru	Saindhavi	2009	
Mazhaiye mazhaiye	Eeram		2009	
Saaral En	Eeram		2009	
Appa Amma Vilayattu	Padikkadavan	Saindhavi	2009	
Hey Rosu Rosu	Padikkadavan	Jaey	2009	
Hey Vetri Velaa	Padikkadavan	Naveen Madhav	2009	
Oru Punnagai Thane	Theeratha Vilayattu Pillai		2009	
Peliccan Paravaigal	Thoranai	Rahul, Rita, Jai	2009	
Vedi Vedi Saravedi	Thoranai	Navin	2009	
Gandharvainin Kottai	Renigunta		2009	
Vaalu Paiyane	Odipolama	Anitha	2009	
Nee Otha Sollu Sollu	Aval Peyar Thamizharasi	Neetha	2010	
Naanayam I	Naanayam		2010	
Naanayam II	Naanayam		2010	
Kulirumika Aliyalaga	Pournami Naagam	Suchitra	2010	
Goa	Goa	Krish, Tanvi, Suchitra, Chynk Showtyme, Pav Bundy	2010	
Gramam Thedi Vaada	Moscowin Kavery	Tippu, Rita	2010	
Fast Fooduthan Neeya	Dhana (D)	Krishna, Ranjith, Vinaita Sivakumar	2010	
"Kattil Mel Adithadia"	Agam Puram	Sayanora Philip	2010	
Adi Rakkamma Rakku	Siruthai	Suchitra & Roshan	2010	
Naan Romba Romba	Siruthai		2010	
Ready Readya	Mappillai	Saindhavi	2011	
Ennoda Raasi	Mappillai		2011	
Vilaiyaadu Mankatha	Mankatha	Yuvan Shankar Raja, Sucharita & Anita & Premgi Amaren	2011	
Poraney Poraney	Vaagai Sooda Vaa	Neha Bhasin	2011	
"Osthi Maamey"	Osthe	Thaman S, Baba Sehgal, Rahul Nambiar, Naveen Madhav	2011	S. Thaman
"Ramar Nadu"	Ayudha Porattam	Nandhan Raj	2011	
"Thottadhu Thottadhu Vettriyagum"	Vilayada Vaa	Suchitra, Rap Biggnickk	2012	
Sollitaley Ava Kaadhala	Kumki	Shreya Ghoshal	2012	
Kaalaiyilirundhu Maalai Varai	Kazhugu	Ganga	2012	
"Eeda Eeda (Nani En Peru)"	Naan Ee		2012	
Kokkalanga	Ullam		2012	
Vilambaram	Vilambaram		2013	
Melala Vedikudhu	Arrambam	Vijay Yesudas, Shweta Mohan	2013	
Jingunamani Jingunamani	Jilla	Sunidhi Chauhan	2014	
Eeramai Eeramai	Un Samayal Arayil	& Vibhavari Joshi	2014	
Bang Bang Bang	Anjaan		2014	
Hello Brother	Irumbu Kuthirai	Suchitra, Chinna Ponnu	2014	G.V.Prakash Kumar
Therikkudhu Masss	Massu Engira Masilamani	Shankar Mahadevan & Yuvan Shankar Raja		
Kuiyyo Muiyyo	Eetti	Vandana Srinivasan ,Maalavika Sundar	2015	G.V.Prakash Kumar
Pazhaya Soru	Thirunaal	Namitha	2016	
Rendupakkam Singadha	Thozha	Navneeth, Premji Gangai Amaran	2016	
Wish You A Happy New Year	Bayam Oru Payanam	Gana Bala, Rita	2016	Y. R. Prasad
Sevatha Pulla	Theeran Adhigaram Ondru		2017	
Vinveera	Tik Tik Tik	Sri Rascol	2018	
Aagayam Enna	Seemathurai	Shreya Ghoshal, Swetha Mohan	2018	
Idhu Enna Maayamo	Adithya Varma	Radhan	2019	
Pachondhi			2019	
Thandalkaaran	NGK		2019	
Ennai Vittu	Kannum Kannum Kollaiyadithaal		2020	

=== Malayalam songs ===
Song	Film	Co-singers	Year
Kana Ponnum	Chanthpottu	Franko, Chorus	2005
Oru Venal Puzhayil	Pranayakalam		2007
Dhiruthana	Rock n' Roll	Tippu	2007
Valayonnith	Rock n' Roll	Vijay Yesudas, Jeemon KJ, Pradeep Palluruthy	2007
Kanamullal	Salt N' Pepper	Shreya Ghoshal	2012
Njan Kanavil	Aagathan	Swetha Mohan	2010
Paappi Appacha	Paappi Appacha	Geemon	2010
Hey! You Queen of Beauty	Twinkle Twinkle Little Star		2010
Mizhikalil Naanam	Christian Brothers	Nikhil Mohan, Rimi Tomy	2011
Wahida	Mylanchi Monchulla Veedu	Shreya Ghoshal	2014
Nee Kannilminnum	Villali Veeran	Jyotsna Radhakrishnan	2014
Chinna Chinna	Premam	Aalap Raju	2015
Paavam Paavada	Paavada		2016
Manasukkulla	Mera Naam Shaji	Shreya Ghoshal	2019
Halaballoo	RDX	Benny Dayal, Naresh Iyer, Sam C. S	2023
"Pushpa Pushpa"	Pushpa 2: The Rule (D)		2024

=== Telugu songs ===
Song	Film	Co-singers	Year
Chandamama	Athadu	Mahalakshmi Iyer, Suchithra	2005
Evaro Nuvva	Godava	Kalyani	2007
Nuvvu Muttukunte	Yamadonga		2007
My Love is Gone	Aarya 2		2009
Ninnatene Sunna Halli	Malli Malli	Naveen	2009
Sodari Janmaki Mundara	Malli Malli		2009
Ek Niranjan	Ek Niranjan		2009
Dheera Gambeera	Kasko		2009
Chirugaali Pallakilo	Manchivadu		2011
Karo Karo	Aakasame Haddu	Suchitra	2011
"Thaliya Thaliya"	Shakti		2011
"Mathileka Pichiga"	Shakti	Chinmayi	2011
"Maha Rudhra Sakthi"	Shakti	Muralidhar, Hemachandra, Hanumantha Rao, Rita, Saindhavi, Srivardhini	2011
"Hossanam"	Veera		2011
Sairo Sairo	Baadshah		2013
Jabilli Nuvve Cheppamma	Ramayya Vasthavayya		2013
Ninu Choodani	Masala	Shreya Ghoshal	2013
Paisa Paisa	Paisa	Rahul Nambiar & Karthik Kumar	2013
Prasante	Karthikeya		2014
Ayyo Pappam	Yevadu	Mamta Sharma	2014
Prathi Chota Nake Swagatham	Govindudu Andarivadele		2014
Bavagari Choope	Govindudu Andarivadele	Vijay Yesudas, Surmukhi Raman & Sri Vardhini	2014
One more time	Temper	Lipsika	2015
Snehitudo	Babu Bangaram		2016
Date Night	Rowdy Boys	Sameera Bharadwaj	2022

=== Kannada songs ===
Song	Film	Co-singers	Year
Jamaise	Nam Areal Ond Dina	Chaitra H. G.	2010
Summaniruva Ee Manasinali	Mathe Mungaru		2010
Yaaralli Soundu Madodu	Mr. and Mrs. Ramachari		2014
Amma Amma Damayanthi	Damayanthi		2019

== Television ==
Year	Title	Role	Channel	Note
2025	Super Singer Junior season 10	Guest	Star Vijay	Performed along with Joshika
