= Sye (2005 film) =

- Directed by: Arun Prasad P.A.
- Written by: Ravi Srivatsa (dialogues)
- Screenplay by: Arun Prasad P.A.
- Based on: Dhill by Dharani
- Produced by: Suresh Choudhary; V. Kuppuswamy
- Starring: Sudeep; Kanika
- Cinematography: Sri Venkat
- Edited by: J.N. Harsha
- Music by: Gurukiran
- Production company: Super Good Combines
- Release date: 1 July 2005
- Country: India
- Language: Kannada

Sye is a 2005 Indian Kannada-language action film directed by Arun Prasad P.A. featuring Sudeep and Kanika in the lead roles. The film features background score and soundtrack composed by Gurukiran and lyrics by Kaviraj and V. Manohar. The film was released on 1 July 2005. This film is remake of Tamil film Dhill. The film was a commercial failure.

== Plot ==
Chakri (Sudeep) harbors a strong ambition to become a police officer and even prepares for the entrance test in earnestness. He has a strong family bond and is ably encouraged by all the family members who want him to be a police official. Chakri falls in love with Kannika who also becomes close to his family members and friends. The right chord of harmony in Chakri's family is threatened when a highly corrupt and cruel police officer Mosale combats and provokes him. Chakri faces his first test when he has to deal with Mosale who wants to trouble him as much as possible. Finally Chakri combats Mosale and even disfigures his face. Mosale wants to take revenge on Chakri and works out plans to see that he does not come out successful in the police entrance examinations. How Chakri comes out of the web created by Mosale and how he finally gets the job forms the rest of the story.

== Cast ==
- Sudeep as Chakri
- Kanika as Renuka/Renu
- Srinath as Chakri's father
- Sumithra as Chakri's mother
- Pasupathy as Inspector Mosale
- Avinash as Sivaji
- Sathyajith as Corrupt Minister
- Rajesh Nataranga as Arjun
- Mandya Ramesh as S.M.Krishna
- Bullet Prakash as Chakri's friend
- Balaraj
- M. S. Umesh
- Mandeep Roy as Police constable
- Komal Kumar as Reliance worker

== Production ==
Sye marks the third collaboration of Sudeep with P. A. Arun Prasad after Chandu (2002) and Kiccha (2003) . Tamil actor Pasupathy plays the role of antagonist, making his debut in Kannada cinema.

== Soundtrack ==
The soundtrack was composed by Gurukiran collaborating with both Sudeep and P. A. Arun Prasad for the second time after Chandu (2002). The soundtrack was released by Anand audio.

Sye

Soundtrack album by Gurukiran
- Released: 1 May 2005
- Genre: Feature film soundtrack
- Length: 19:56
- Language: Kannada
- Label: Anand audio
- Producer: Gurukiran

Gurukiran chronology
Nammanna (2005)	Sye (2005)	News (2005)

All lyrics are written by Kaviraj.

No.	Title	Singer(s)	Length
1.	"Sye Yelladaku Sye"	Gurukiran	4:33
2.	"Baare Baa Bhama"	Rajesh Krishnan, Mangala	3:35
3.	"Yelu Yeddelu"	Gurukiran	3:25
4.	"Cheliya Cheliya"	Karthik, Chaitra HG	4:32
5.	"Koo Koo Maina"	Udit Narayan, K.S. Chitra	4:18

== Reception ==
A critic from Sify opined that "This film has all commercial ingredients like dance, action, songs and sentiments. Sudeep has done his part convincingly along with Pashupathi, as inspector Musale, has performed well". Film critic R. G. Vijayasarathy of IANS said that "Despite having talented artists like Sudeep, Pashupathi and many proven artists, Arun Prasad makes a mess of his job. He has also failed to extract the best work from technicians also".
