= Kiccha =

2003 Indian film by P. A. Arun Prasad

- Directed by: P. A. Arun Prasad
- Written by: Ravi Srivatsa (dialogues)
- Screenplay by: P. A. Arun Prasad
- Story by: P. A. Arun Prasad
- Produced by: Ramu
- Starring: Sudeep; Shweta Agarwal
- Cinematography: Sundarnath Suvarna
- Edited by: S. Manohar
- Music by: Hamsalekha
- Release date: 11 April 2003
- Running time: 154 minutes
- Country: India
- Language: Kannada

Kiccha is a 2003 Kannada-language political action drama film directed by P. A. Arun Prasad featuring Sudeep and Shweta Agarwal in the lead roles.The film featured an original score soundtrack and lyrics was composed by Hamsalekha. The film was released on 11 April 2003.

== Plot ==
Krishna Mohan aka Kiccha (Sudeep) is a law graduate who fights against injustice and corruption which happens around his surroundings. On the occasion of Convocation day, Kiccha abuses the Education Minister Harikrishna (Anandaraj) for not providing education facilities to the children. Kiccha is badly beaten by the police for abusing the minister. Sharada (Sujatha), Kiccha's mother feels bad about her son spending time with his friends without any job. Kiccha and his friends attend a job interview. Kiccha along with other job applicants wait for long hours, but the interview board sends them back and tells them that the interview is over. Intolerant Kiccha and others react harshly towards the interview board and also beat up a candidate. Kiccha stops beating the candidate after seeing him bleeding. The candidate was a kidney transplant patient who came for the interview from the hospital. He comes from a poor family where no one is able to fulfill their basic amenities. If the candidate gets this job he can earn an income for the livelihood of his family. After seeing the critical condition of the candidate Kiccha refuses to attend the interview. One day Kiccha meets a college girl named Suma, who is an orphan. Suma becomes the love of his life after their several meetings. Kiccha's friend is arrested by the Police for killing his father. If any Government employee dies then the job will go to his family members including his spouse or his children, which was also done by Kiccha's friend due to unemployment. Kiccha gets devastated after seeing this. To eliminate the corruption and lack of employment in the society, Kiccha decides to stand as the sole candidate in the election against a politician cum rowdy Jayaraj (Ponnambalam) who is the mayor of the city. Kiccha can't get nominated because Jayaraj and his party members are strong and they have Rowdism along with politics. Kiccha goes to Jayaraj's place and thrashes him which leads Jayaraj to cancel his nomination against Kiccha. Kiccha stands as the candidate instead of Jayaraj. Kiccha was stabbed by someone at the festival, but nobody noticed who did this. Kiccha is admitted to the hospital. It is none other than Kiccha who stabbed himself to acquire public support and sympathy from the people.

Kiccha is selected as the Mayor, where he eliminates corruptions in the society. Kiccha marries Suma on his mother's request. When Kiccha sees the death of some poor people by eating cyanide which is mixed in their food. He suspects Welfare minister Chandrashekhar who might be involved in this murder. Kiccha takes necessary actions against the Welfare minister for these crimes. But unfortunately, the minister gets killed by tasting cyanide which is scrubbed on a file paper given by Kiccha. Chief Minister (Avinash) wants to see Kiccha. Kiccha is welcomed to the C.M's office. C.M will help Kiccha as he can ask anything from the Chief Minister. Kiccha requests the C.M that he like to work in children's education portfolio as the education minister. Immediately Kiccha become the education minister. He bribes money from many Government officials for providing education to the illiterate people and middle-class people from poverty. Kiccha becomes a corrupt politician which makes hatred to his mother, his wife and his friends towards Kiccha. Kiccha tells that he became the education minister to only do corruption. Sharadha and Suma leaves the place and won't come back in Kiccha's life again.

Former education minister Harikrishna sent some goons to finish Kiccha but he thrashes them and came to meet Harikrishna to bargain with him. If he stands with Kiccha they can make a Government and also Harikrishna will get the opportunity of C.M post by succeeding the present Chief Minister. Kiccha joint hands with Harikrishna. With the help of Kiccha, Harikrishna acquired support from politicians, M.L.A's and other parliamentary members. Kiccha who gave the wicked idea to Harikrishna of gaining the C.M seat, shoots every illegitimate activities done by these politicians. Kiccha shows the video of Harikrishna and other politicians to the Chief Minister and also tells that he is the mastermind behind in this. Kiccha also tells to the C.M that these people are only bothered about money and their post not about their responsibility. Suma gave birth to a baby boy. Kiccha who came eager to see his son is not shown by Suma. She also tells to Kiccha that she will continue as a widow and also nurture her child without Kiccha. Heartbroken Kiccha tries to change the corrupt system with the help of his friends. He donates fund available for the children in orphanage. He also donates fund to illiterate people for their children's education. Kiccha plans and arranges a speech show which consists of Chief minister, Harikrishna, Orphanage Trustee, and other politicians. Harikrishna hired some goons to shoot Kiccha after his speech. Kiccha declared publicly that free education will be provided, free transport service, free health facilities, free job services for unemployed people will be provided. But he states that these will not be happened due to corruption which is already spread over the state. Kiccha also tells that this is a part of the development of the state which becomes misery due to the corrupt politicians. Kiccha already had another plan to become minister to change the corrupt system. He is the one who had killed former Welfare minister Chandrashekar intelligently by scrubbing cyanide in a file which was given by Kiccha. And he also states publicly that Harikrishna had planned everything to finish Kiccha after the speech. Kiccha gets shot while presenting the speech by his friend. Kiccha had already planned with his friends to kill himself for stopping the entire corrupt system. But they can't do this to Kiccha. He states that if one gives his own life for the sake of everyone it will not be a guilty. Kiccha was shot badly by his friends among the crowd and also make the public believe that Harikrishna's men are behind this. Few minutes before his death Kiccha tells that 'no one should get corrupted and unemployed'. The crowd attacked the guests including Chief Minister, Harikrishna and other corrupt politicians. Sharadha, Suma forgives Kiccha after knowing his sincerity and cries near Kiccha's body. The entire corrupt system is changed. Individuals in educational institutions, Government offices and other institutions prays for Kiccha's soul. A new government is formed in Karnataka which consists of sincere government officials including Chief Minister, Home Minister, District collector, Mayor.

== Cast ==
- Sudeep as Krishna Mohan alias Kiccha, a student turned corporate mayor, then Education Minister
- Shweta Agarwal as Suma, Kiccha's love interest turned wife
- Sujatha as Sharada, Kiccha's mother
- Ajay Rao as Kiccha's friend
- Sadhu Kokila as CD Babu, Kiccha's friend
- Sanketh Kashi
- Anandaraj as Education Minister G.K Harikrishna
- Avinash as Chief Minister Ranganna
- Vinayak Joshi as Kiccha's friend
- Satyajit as Welfare minister Chandrashekhar
- Mico Manju as Kumar
- Karibasavaiah
- Vaijanath Biradar as hostel watchman
- Mandya Ramesh as Umapathi, a homosexual
- M. S. Karanth as Home Minister
- M. M. Aiyappa as BBMP commissioner
- Ravi Srivatsa
- Bhavyashree Rai
- Ponnambalam as Jayaraj, ex-mayor cum rowdy

== Production ==
The film marks the second collaboration of Sudeep with director P. A. Arun Prasad after Chandu(2002), latter's first Kannada film. Debutant Swetha Agarwal was selected as the heroine. Producer Ramu choose music director Hamsalekha who collaborated with the former in many successful movies like AK-47, Lockup Death, Simhada Mari etc.

== Soundtrack ==
Hamsalekha composed and written the music collaborating with Sudeep for the second time after Sparsha (2000). The music was released by Akash Audio.

Kiccha

Soundtrack album by Hamsalekha
- Released: 5 November 2003
- Recorded: 2003
- Genre: Soundtrack
- Length: 31:37
- Label: Akash Audio
- Producer: Hamsalekha

Hamsalekha chronology
Devara Makkalu (2003)	Kiccha (2003)	Ramaswamy Krishnaswamy (2003)
External audio
- Official Audio Jukebox on YouTube

Track list
No.	Title	Singer(s)	Length
1.	"Dankanakkana"	Shankar Mahadevan	5:16
2.	"Karna Kundala"	Hariharan	6:33
3.	"Mankutimma Mankutimma"	Shankar Mahadevan	4:32
4.	"Meghakke Megha"	Hariharan, K. S. Chithra	5:38
5.	"Nanna Kasthuri"	Udit Narayan, K. S. Chithra	4:59
6.	"Ranga Nayakira"	Anupama	4:39
Total length:			31:37

== Reception ==
A critic from Viggy wrote that "Director P.A. Arun prasad manages to hold grip till the interval where majority of it are student life, unemployment problems, Kiccha playing a good samaritan for the needy, love and corrupt officials". A critic from indiainfo.com wrote that "For a change in Kichha one could speak about Sudeep's performance that the grandeur, which is usually present in every film produced by Ramu".

== Box office ==
This film was a blockbuster at the box office. The success of the movie lead actor Sudeep to put the title name "Kiccha" as his stage name prefix which was already used as a nickname for his character in the movie Huchcha (2001). This film was a major milestone in Sudeep's career and also heightened his stardom as an action hero in Kannada cinema.

== Awards ==
Filmfare Awards South :-

- Best Director - Kannada - P.A. Arun Prasad
