= Will (2025 film) =

Indian Tamil-language crime thriller family drama film

- Theatrical release poster
- Directed by: S. Sivaraman
- Written by: S. Sivaraman
- Produced by: S. Sivaraman
- Starring: Sonia Agarwal; Alekhya Ramnaidu
- Cinematography: T. S. Prasanna
- Edited by: Dinesh G
- Music by: Saurabh Aggarwal
- Production company: Foot Steps Production
- Release date: 10 October 2025
- Country: India
- Language: Tamil

Will is a 2025 Indian Tamil-language legal drama film written, directed, and produced by S. Sivaraman under the banner of Foot Steps Production. The film stars Sonia Agarwal and Alekhya Ramnaidu in the lead roles with Vikranth in a special appearance.

== Plot ==
When a new judge is transferred to the Madras High Court, a series of lawyers' requests for preponement or postponement of multiple cases occurs. While one insists that a hearing be scheduled earlier, as it deals with a film's release date, another cites the unavailability of a senior lawyer to push a different case to a later time.

== Cast ==
- Vikranth as Palani Vel Murugan (special appearance)
- Sonia Agarwal as Judge Thanu Randha
- Alekhya Ramnaidu as Shraddha
- Padam Venu Kumar as Vignesh Reddy
- Mohan Raman as Mohan
- Swaminathan as Rangarajan
- TSR Srinivasan as Velmurugan

== Production ==
The film is written, directed, and produced by S. Sivaraman under his home banner Foot Steps Production. Principal photography took place in various locations across Tamil Nadu. The film's technical team includes T. S. Prasanna as the cinematographer, Dinesh G as the editor, and Saurabh Aggarwal composing the background score and songs.

== Reception ==
Harshini SV of The Times of India wrote that "Sivaraman's debut film is full of heart, with a moving portrayal of a woman's life and the choices she makes to protect her family." Dina Thanthi stated that Sivaraman has written and directed the film in a way that reveals surprising information about the legal matters related to the will. Maalai Malar praised the performances of Agarwal and Vikranth, and the cinematography, but was critical of the screenplay for slowing down in the film's latter half.
