= P. A. Arun Prasad =

Indian film director

- Born: Alaparthi Sivanagaprasad Chowdary; 18 April 1967 (age 59)
- Occupations: Director script writer
- Years active: 1999-present
- Spouse: Sijimol Alaparthi
- Children: Tanvi Alaparthi; Vishal Alaparthi
- Parent(s): Alaparthi Subbaramaiah; Alaparthi Anasuyamma
- Relatives: Anil Ravipudi (nephew)

Alaparthi Sivanagaprasad Chowdary, known professionally as P. A. Arun Prasad, is an Indian film director, screenwriter and producer known for his works in Telugu, Kannada, and Tamil cinema. He has received a Filmfare Award South and a state Nandi Award.

== Awards ==
- Nandi Awards
  - Nandi Award for Best Feature Film (Bronze) - Gowtam SSC (2005)
- Filmfare Awards South
  - Filmfare Award for Best Director - Kannada - Kiccha (2003)

== Filmography ==
Year	Film	Language	Notes
1999	Thammudu	Telugu	Debut
2001	Badri	Tamil	Debut in Tamil cinema
2001	Bhalevadivi Basu	Telugu	
2001	Prema Sandadi	Telugu	
2002	Chandu	Kannada	Debut in Kannada cinema
2003	Kiccha	Kannada	
2004	Sathruvu	Telugu	
2005	Sye	Kannada	
2005	Goutham SSC	Telugu	
2010	Maa Nanna Chiranjeevi	Telugu	
2010	Yagam	Telugu	
2011	Chattam	Telugu	
2018	Man of the Match	Telugu	
