= Swaminathan =

Indian actor and comedian (born 1959)

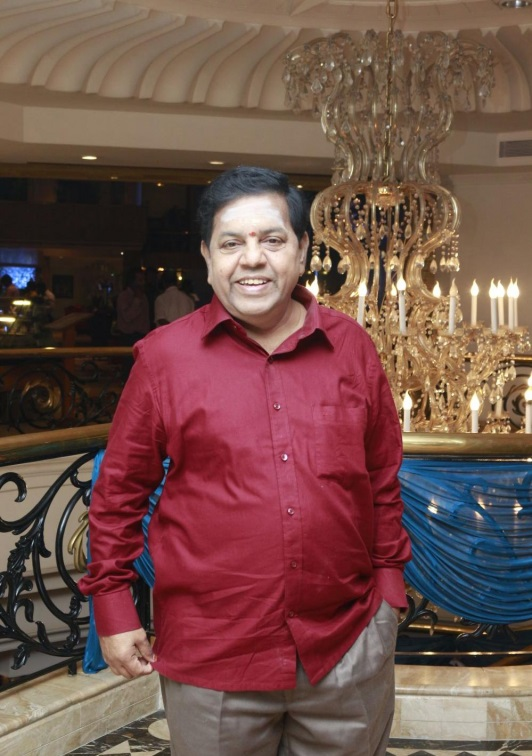
- Swaminathan in 2010
- Born: 31 January 1959 (age 67); Kumbakonam, Thanjavur District, Madras State (now Tamil Nadu), India
- Occupation: Actor
- Years active: 1985–present

Swaminathan (born 31 January 1959) is an Indian actor and comedian on working in the Tamil film and television industry. He appeared in prominent roles in Vijay TV's satiric series Lollu Sabha before becoming a full-fledged actor in Tamil films.

== Filmography ==
=== Tamil films ===
Year	Film	Role	Notes
1985	Naan Sigappu Manithan	Shanmugam	
1985	Naane Raja Naane Mandhiri	Kathavarayan	
1987	Chinna Poove Mella Pesu	Boopathy	
1988	Manasukkul Mathappu	Mental patient	
1989	Dilly Babu		
1989	Solaikuyil	Peter (Gardener)	
1990	Sirayil Sila Raagangal		Uncredited role
1990	Pudhiya Sarithiram		
1991	Thanga Thamaraigal	Moorthy	
1991	Thanthu Vitten Ennai	Security guard	Uncredited role
1992	Thalaivasal		Uncredited role
1992	Singaravelan	one of the constables	Uncredited role
1992	Abhirami		
1993	Udan Pirappu		
1994	Maindhan		
1995	Karuppu Nila	Police constable	
1995	Mayabazar	Swaminathan	
1996	Musthaffaa		
1996	Irattai Roja		
1997	Arunachalam		Uncredited role
2001	Poovellam Un Vasam	Saamy	
2003	Ice		
2005	Dancer		
2005	Amudhey	Priest	
2005	Aaru		
2005	Ayodhya		
2005	Aadhikkam		
2006	Nagareega Komali	Serial director	
2007	Sivaji	Customer	
2008	Pathu Pathu	Kannan	
2009	Padikkadavan	Malaisamy	
2009	Innoruvan		
2009	Thoranai	Cashier	Bilingual film
2010	Ambasamudram Ambani		
2010	Rasikkum Seemane		Uncredited role
2010	Kattradhu Kalavu	Police inspector	
2010	Boss Engira Bhaskaran	Matured student	
2010	Chikku Bukku	Krishna's father	
2011	Pillaiyar Theru Kadaisi Veedu	Police inspector	
2011	Yuvan Yuvathi	Sakkarai's father	
2011	Vellore Maavattam	Retired S.P.	
2011	Velayudham	Maama	
2012	Oru Kal Oru Kannadi	Ulundurpettai Ulagananda Swami	
2012	Ishtam		
2012	Madha Gaja Raja		
2013	Kanna Laddu Thinna Aasaiya	Shiva and Sowmiya's neighbour	
2013	Onbadhule Guru	Velu Nayakkar	
2013	Ethir Neechal	Paavadaisamy/Google	
2013	Thillu Mullu		
2013	Singam II	Peon	
2013	Pattathu Yaanai	Doctor	
2013	Desingu Raja		Special appearance in song "Pom Pom"
2013	Ainthu Ainthu Ainthu	G.R	
2013	Varuthapadatha Valibar Sangam	Lawyer	
2013	Vanakkam Chennai	Ponraj	
2013	Raja Rani	Flat Secretary	
2013	Naveena Saraswathi Sabatham	MLA Ekambaram	
2013	Endrendrum Punnagai	Somasundaram	
2013	Yaaruda Mahesh	Somasundaram	
2014	Idhu Kathirvelan Kadhal	Man in Hanuman getup	
2014	Marumugam		
2014	Thalaivan		
2014	Pongadi Neengalum Unga Kadhalum	Police officer	
2014	Sigaram Thodu	Santosham	
2014	Aranmanai	Vella Poondu	
2014	Salim	Dr. Swaminathan	
2014	Kalkandu	Ramanathan	
2014	Oru Modhal Oru Kadhal	Shrinivasan	
2014	Enna Satham Indha Neram	Murugaraj	
2014	Irumbu Kuthirai	Traffic police	
2014	Maan Karate	Doctor	
2015	Rombha Nallavan Da Nee		
2015	Agathinai	Mani	
2015	Iravum Pagalum Varum		
2015	Vasuvum Saravananum Onna Padichavanga	Point to Point Padmanabhan	
2015	Vedalam	Swamy	
2015	Palakkattu Madhavan		
2015	Ivanuku Thannila Gandam	Kuzhandaivel	
2015	Vai Raja Vai		
2016	Naalu Per Naalu Vidhama Pesuvaanga		
2016	Saagasam		
2016	Mapla Singam		
2016	Adida Melam		
2016	Jithan 2		
2016	Theri	Bride's father	
2016	Manithan	Lawyer	
2016	Meera Jaakirathai	Police officer	
2016	Velainu Vandhutta Vellaikaaran	Bar tender	
2016	Pandiyoda Galatta Thaangala		
2016	Oru Naal Koothu		
2016	Enakku Innoru Per Irukku		
2016	Tamilselvanum Thaniyar Anjalum	"Rotten tooth" Sekar	
2016	Yaanai Mel Kuthirai Sawaari		
2016	Remo	Moulee Anna	
2016	Kodi	Samiyappan	
2016	Azhahendra Sollukku Amudha	Priest	
2016	Manal Kayiru 2		
2016	Kaththi Sandai		
2017	Yaman	Govindhan	
2017	Mupparimanam	Arivudai	
2017	Oru Mugathirai		
2017	Thangaratham		
2017	Anbanavan Asaradhavan Adangadhavan	Swami Thatha	
2017	Vivegam		
2017	Katha Nayagan		
2017	12-12-1950		
2017	Sakka Podu Podu Raja	Santa's uncle	
2018	Mannar Vagaiyara		
2018	Nagesh Thiraiyarangam		
2018	Pei Irukka Illaya		
2018	Itly	Ashmitha's father	
2018	Kasu Mela Kasu		
2018	Mohini	Balki	
2018	Seema Raja	Pulimurugan	
2018	Genius	Traffic constable	
2018	Pattinapakkam		
2018	Thimiru Pudichavan	Madonna's father	
2019	Simba		
2019	Oviyavai Vitta Yaru		
2019	Pottu	Thief	
2019	Thanimai		
2019	100	Gajapathy Swamy (Gary)	
2019	Gorilla	Bank Customer	
2019	A1	Swaminathan	
2019	Kaappaan	Ramanujam	
2019	50/50	Lawyer	
2020	Seeru	Priest	
2020	Cocktail	Flat secretary	
2020	Soorarai Pottru		
2020	Irandam Kuththu		
2020	Naanga Romba Busy	Swaminathan	
2020	Kombu	Pasupathy	
2021	Mathil		
2021	Sabhaapathy	Raja Mani	
2021	Velan	Priest	
2022	Naai Sekar	Regional Manager	
2022	Enna Solla Pogirai	Swami	
2022	Oh My Dog	PT master	
2022	Ranga		
2022	Kichi Kichi		
2022	My Dear Bootham		
2022	Pistha	Gemini Ganesan	
2022	Kaalangalil Aval Vasantham	Shyam's Office Manager	
2022	Sardar	Reporter	
2022	Varalaru Mukkiyam		
2023	Kodai	Vadivel	
2023	Ghosty		
2023	DD Returns	Church Father	
2023	Thudikkum Karangal		
2023	Raid		
2023	80s Buildup		
2024	Vadakkupatti Ramasamy	Gopal Siddha Vaithiyar	
2024	Inga Naan Thaan Kingu	Ramesh	
2025	Madha Gaja Raja	'Theekuchi' Thirumugam	
2025	Perusu		
2025	Madras Matinee	Bank Manager	
2025	Desingu Raja 2	Vijaya	
2025	Maheshwaran Magimai		
2025	Will	Rangarajan	
2025	Thanthra		
2026	Ram and Leela		
2026	Mookuthi Amman 2	Landlord’s uncle	

=== Other language films ===
Year	Film	Role	Language	Notes
2009	Pistha	Cashier	Telugu	Bilingual film
2015	Nirnayakam	Kunchankumar	Malayalam	
2015	Acha Dhin		Malayalam	
2018	B.Tech	Dr. France	Malayalam	

=== Television ===
- Anandha Bhavan
- Lollu Sabha
- Metti Oli
- Kolangal
- Arasi
- Chellamadi Nee Enakku
- Thendral
- Vani Rani
- Priyamanaval
- All In All Alamelu
- Kana Kaanum Kaalangal
- Bigg Boss (Guest)
- Joking Bad (2023) as Walter Vetrivel White (Walter White), a.k.a. Vellai
- Paarijatham
