= Goutham SSC =

2005 film directed by P. A. Arun Prasad

- Film poster
- Directed by: P. A. Arun Prasad
- Written by: Ramesh-Gopi (dialogues)
- Screenplay by: P. A. Arun Prasad
- Story by: P. A. Arun Prasad
- Produced by: Y Sonia Reddy
- Starring: Navdeep; Sindhu Tolani; Madhu Sharma; Bhanupriya
- Cinematography: J. Siva Kumar
- Music by: Anoop Rubens
- Production company: Visu Film International
- Release date: 30 December 2005
- Running time: 150 minutes
- Country: India
- Language: Telugu

Goutham SSC is a 2005 Indian Telugu-language drama film directed by P. A. Arun Prasad. Navdeep, Sindhu Tolani, Madhu Sharma and Bhanupriya played the lead roles. Music is by Anoop Rubens. This film won the Nandi Award for Third Best Film in 2005.

== Plot ==
Goutham is youngest of three sons of Collector Shambhu Prasad. His wife Chaya Rani is a professor, eldest son Manoj is a doctor, second one Neeraj is a businessman, and his daughters-in-law are also in a well-to-do status. But his last son fails to go beyond S.S.C.. Goutham is more close to his neighbors Dr. Bhanu and Kondal Rao than his family. He is not respected in the family and doesn't have a clear goal in life. He also builds a strong friendship with tutor Janaki, who teaches his brother's kids. Though Mr. Prasad ignores his son's small gaffes, he doesn't spare him when he discovers that Goutham forged his signature. Enraged, he throws him out of the house. Now homeless, Goutham is taken by Janaki to her house and falls in love with her. There, he starts working as a mechanic repairing vehicles. He gets inspired by the words of Bhanu and plunges himself into automobile repairing. He invents a carburetor that gives a mileage of 120 km per liter and makes his brother as the patentee for his apparatus. He saves his eldest brother from a conspiracy of hospital management and also fixes the marriage of his sister with her lover. In spite of doing all good to his family, he never lets his father know about these things as his father always wishes to see his third son as an I.A.S. officer. He strives for that and his love is also not informed of his efforts. The movie ends with sharing his triumph with his father.

== Cast ==
- Navdeep as Goutham Kumar I.A.S
- Sindhu Tolani as Janaki
- Madhu Sharma as Bhramaramba
- Bhanupriya as Dr. Bhanu
- Ahuti Prasad as Doctor, Chairman of the hospital where Manoj works
- Ravali as Renu, Goutham's sister-in-law
- Nassar as Shambu Prasad IAS, Later retired Collector (Goutham's father)
- Fathima Babu as Chaya Rani, Goutham's mother
- Shiju as Manoj, Goutham's Brother
- Srinivas Varma Buddharaju as Neeraj, Goutham's brother
- Babloo Prithiveeraj as Kondal Rao, Bhanu's husband
- Gundu Hanumantha Rao as Pandiyan, chef
- Raghunatha Reddy as Sudheer
- Dharmavarapu Subramanyam as Phillips, Garage Owner
- K. Viswanath as Kaloji Rao IAS
- Shanoor Sana as Susheela, Janaki's mother
- Abhinaya Krishna as Goutham's friend
- Prudhvi Raj as Police Officer
- Chinna as Kanta Reddy
- Shravan Raghavendra as Vivek

== Soundtrack ==
The music was composed by Anup Rubens and released by Aditya Music. All lyrics were penned by Sirivennela Seetharama Sastry. The audio was launched on 1 December 2005 at the residence of Y. S. Rajasekhara Reddy who released the audio cassettes while audio CD launch was held at the residence of film's producer C. C. Reddy on 9 December 2005.

Goutham SSC

Soundtrack album by Anup Rubens
- Released: 2005
- Recorded: 2005
- Genre: Soundtrack
- Length: 23:34
- Label: Aditya Music
- Producer: Anup Rubens

Anup Rubens chronology
| Dhairyam (2005) | Goutham SSC (2005) | Veedhi (2006) |

Track list
| No. | Title | Singer(s) | Length |
|---|---|---|---|
| 1. | "Amma Nanna" | Tippu, Pallavi | 4:19 |
| 2. | "Anaganaga Oka Raju" | Karthik, Sunitha | 4:49 |
| 3. | "Edo Asha" | Shreya Ghoshal | 4:30 |
| 4. | "Madhi Layalo" | Reshma, Uday Rubens | 4:36 |
| 5. | "Oh Oh Mariya" | Ranjith | 4:05 |
| 6. | "Theme Bit" (Instrumental) | | 1:15 |
| Total length: | | | 23:34 |

== Reception ==
Idlebrain wrote "First half of the film is entertaining. Second half of the film is mixed with some emotional moments and a few boring moments. The plus points of the film are decent presentation and good music".

== Awards ==
- The film won Nandi Award for Third Best Feature Film Produced by Y. Sonia Reddy (2005)
