= Unnaal Ennaal =

- Official poster
- Directed by: A. R. Jayakrishnaa
- Written by: A. R. Jayakrishnaa
- Produced by: Perummalammal Rajendran
- Starring: Sonia Agarwal; Ravi Mariya; Rajesh; R. Sundarrajan; Delhi Ganesh
- Cinematography: Kichaas
- Edited by: M. R. Rajeesh
- Music by: Rizwan
- Production company: Shri Shri Ganesha Creation
- Distributed by: Action Reaction Jenish
- Release date: 2 June 2023
- Country: India
- Language: Tamil

Unnaal Ennaal (transl. Because of you, I...) is a 2023 Indian Tamil-language drama film written and directed by A. R. Jayakrishnaa. The film stars Sonia Agarwal, Ravi Mariya, Rajesh, R. Sundarrajan and Delhi Ganesh in lead roles. Perummalammal Rajendran produced it under the banner of Shri Shri Ganesha Creation, with music composed by Rizwan.

== Cast ==
- Sonia Agarwal
- Ravi Mariya
- Rajesh
- R. Sundarrajan
- Delhi Ganesh
- A. R. Jayakrishnaa
- Jaga
- Umesh
- Monika

== Production ==
The film's cinematography was done by Kichaas, while M. R. Rajeesh handled the editing of the film. In June 2017, Sonia Agarwal conformed that she is playing the lead role in this film. The film was released on 2 June 2023.

== Reception ==
A critic from Dina Thanthi wrote that "Director Jayakrishna has tried to showcase friendship, love and real estate scams. Could have focused more on the screenplay." A critic from Thinaboomi stated that "This film would have been a good film if the concept had been taken and it had been properly shot with good scenes."
