= Sonia Agarwal =

Indian actress and model (born 1982)

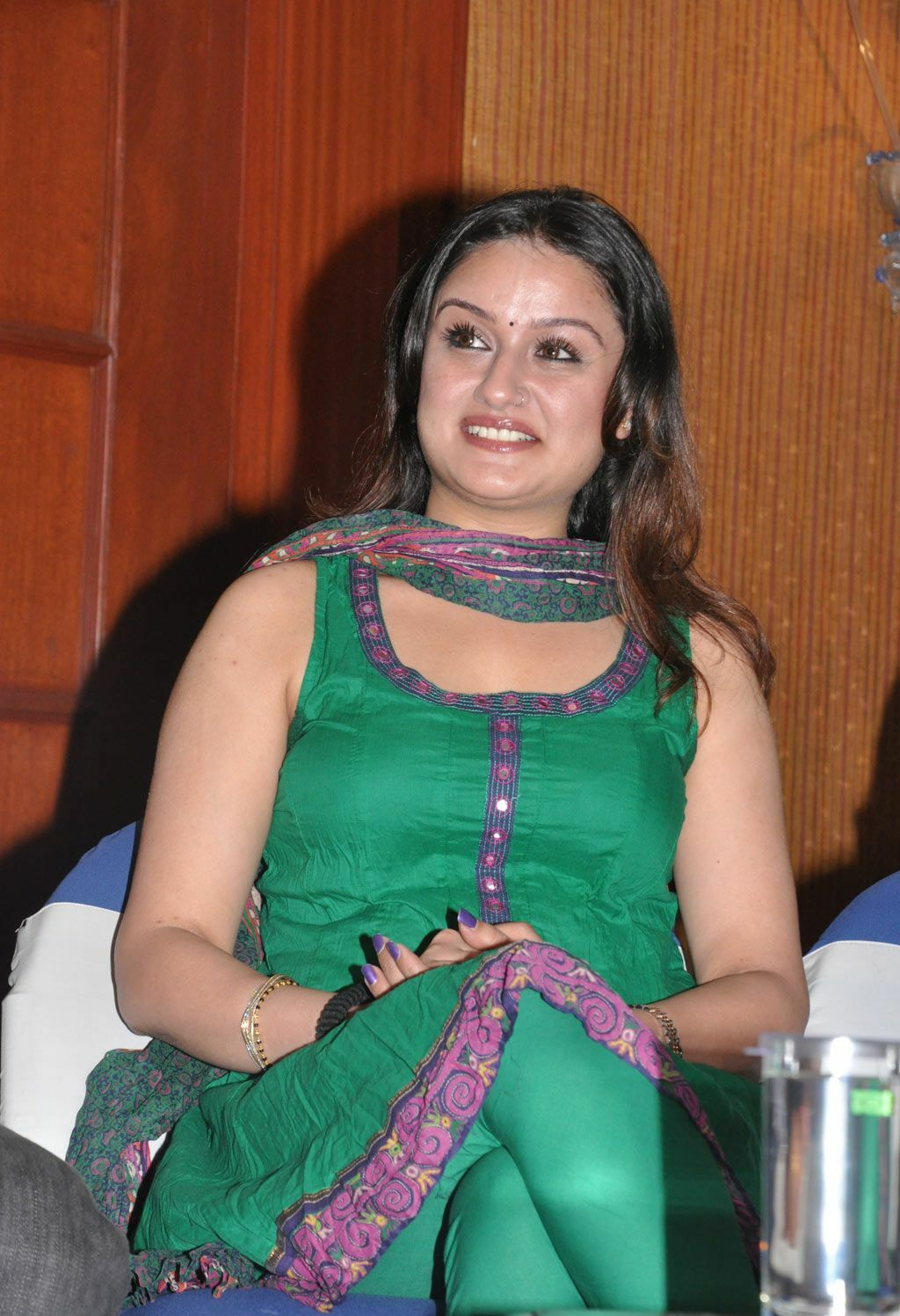
- Sonia Agarwal at audio launch
- Born: 28 March 1982 (age 44); Chandigarh, India
- Occupations: Actress; Model
- Years active: 2002–2009; 2011–present
- Spouse: Selvaraghavan (m. 2006; div. 2010)

Sonia Agarwal is an Indian actress known for her works predominantly in Tamil cinema and a few Telugu, Malayalam and Kannada films. She is best known for her performances in films Kaadhal Kondein (2003), 7G Rainbow Colony (2004) and Pudhupettai (2006).

== Personal life ==
Born in Chandigarh Sonia's mother tongue is Punjabi. Sonia married Selvaraghavan, a director in Tamil cinema, in December 2006. She gave up acting after her marriage and resumed her career after their divorce in 2010.

== Career ==
During her school days, Sonia got an offer to act in a serial on Zee TV. She then made her film debut with a small role in the 2002 Telugu film, Nee Premakai, after which she acted in a Kannada film Chandu opposite Sudeep.

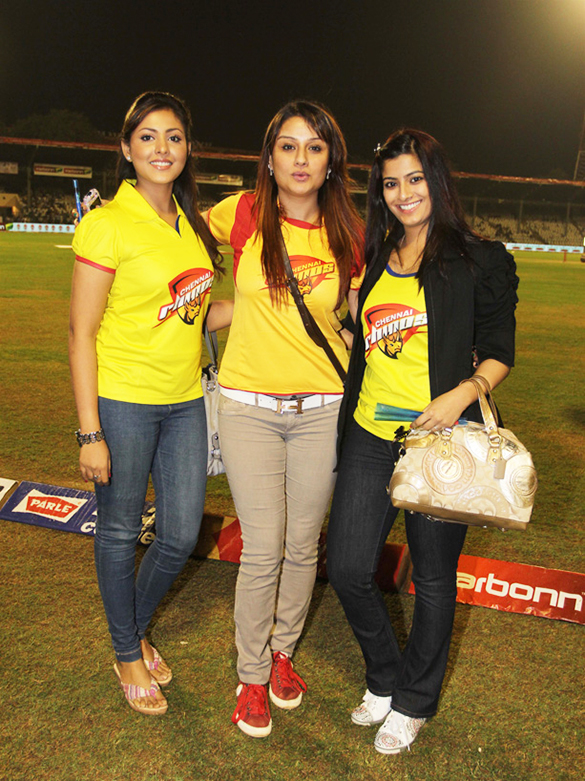
Agarwal with Madhu Shalini and Varalakshmi Sarathkumar at CCL3.

Agarwal's first Tamil film, Kaadhal Kondein with Dhanush, became a huge success and appreciation for her performance in the film brought her into the limelight and fetched her the ITFA Best New Actress Award at International Tamil Film Awards in 2004. She acted alongside Silambarasan and Vijay in the films Kovil and Madhurey, respectively. After appearing in the films Oru Kalluriyin Kathai and Oru Naal Oru Kanavu in 2005, both of which failed to perform at the box office, she got roles in the films Thiruttu Payale and Pudhupettai. The former, directed by Susi Ganesan, became a highly successful film, whilst the latter, another Selvaraghavan film, received universal critical acclaim.

After her divorce, she resumed acting in films, playing a supporting role in the multi-starrer Vaanam, following which she signed up for four projects, three in Tamil and one in Malayalam, in quick succession.

Her next releases were Sadhurangam, opposite Srikanth once again, in 2011 and Oru Nadigaiyin Vaakkumoolam in early 2012.

Sonia Agarwal debuts in Malayalam with Mukesh titled Grihanathan (2012). She plays the lead character in the Tamil mega serial Malli (2013–2014). She starred with Vivek in the comedy drama Palakkattu Madhavan (2015).

In 2019, she was sees her play the mother of a younger Arun Vijay in Thadam. She starred in Dasharatha in Kannada with Ravichandran and had back-to-back releases in Tamil films Ayogya and Thanimai.

Later, she was cast in lead roles such as Miya (2020), Grandma (2022), Unnaal Ennaal (2023), 7/G (2024), Will (2025) and Paruthi (2025).

In 2024, she was a contestant in the comedy-cooking show Top Cooku Dupe Cooku and got eliminated in episode 5.

== Filmography ==
Key
†	Denotes films that have not yet been released

=== Films ===
Year	Title	Role	Language	Notes	Ref
2002	Nee Premakai	Raaji	Telugu		
2002	Chandu	Vidya	Kannada		
2003	Kaadhal Kondein	Divya	Tamil	Won, ITFA Best New Actress Award	
2003	Ooh La La		Kannada		
2003	Dham	Pooja	Telugu		
2003	Success	Swetha	Tamil		
2004	Kovil	Fathima Begum / Angel Devi	Tamil		
2004	Madhurey	Susheela	Tamil		
2004	7G Rainbow Colony	Anitha	Tamil	Nominated, Filmfare Award for Best Tamil Actress	
2004	7G Brindhavan Colony	Anitha	Telugu		
2005	Oru Kalluriyin Kathai	Jothi	Tamil		
2005	Oru Naal Oru Kanavu	Maya Devi	Tamil		
2006	Thiruttu Payale	Rosy / Saranya	Tamil		
2006	Pudhupettai	Selvi	Tamil	Nominated, Filmfare Award for Best Supporting Actress – Tamil	
2011	Vaanam	Zara	Tamil		
2011	Sadhurangam	Sandhya	Tamil	Delayed release, Filmed in 2003–06	
2012	Oru Nadigaiyin Vaakkumoolam	Anjali	Tamil		
2012	Gruhanathan	Anitha	Malayalam		
2014	Amma Nanna Oorelithe	Dancer	Telugu	Special appearance in song	
2015	Temper	Doctor	Telugu		
2015	Palakkattu Madhavan	Lakshmi	Tamil		
2015	Jamna Pyari	Dancer	Malayalam	Cameo appearance in "Murugappa"	
2015	Ranna	Dancer	Kannada	Special appearance in "What Do What Not To Do"	
2017	Saaya	Police inspector	Tamil		
2017	Winner	Mahendra Reddy's wife	Telugu		
2017	Yevanavan	Inspector Rose	Tamil		
2018	Theetta Rappai	Kochuthresia	Malayalam		
2019	Thadam	Lakshmi	Tamil		
2019	Dasharatha	Kousalya	Kannada		
2019	Ayogya	Doctor	Tamil		
2019	Thanimai	Yazhini	Tamil		
2020	Miya	Advocate Sonia	Tamil		
2021	Red	Bharathi	Telugu		
2022	Kaypakka	Sonia	Malayalam		
2022	Grandma	Trisha	Tamil		
2022	Ward 126	Jyothisri	Tamil		
2022	Sasanasabha	Shyamala Bharath	Telugu		
2023	Unnaal Ennaal	Parameshwari	Tamil		
2023	Bagheera	Priyam	Tamil	Deleted scenes	
2023	Moondram Manithan	Ramya	Tamil		
2024	Dandupalyam		Tamil	Tamil version	
2024	7/G	Manjula	Tamil		
2024	Seeran	Church Sister	Tamil		
2025	Behindd	Liya	Malayalam		
2025	Gift	Inspector S. Arudhra	Tamil		
2025	Will	Thanu Randha	Tamil		
2025	Paruthi	Kanni Amma	Tamil		
2026	Dark Giant		Tamil		
TBA	7/G Rainbow Colony 2 †	Anitha	Tamil	Cameo appearance	
TBA	7/G Brindavan Colony 2 †	Anitha	Telugu	Cameo appearance	

=== Television ===
Year	Title	Role	Channel	Notes
2008–2009	Naanal	Radhika	Kalaignar TV	
2013–2014	Malli	Vinothini	Puthuyugam TV	
2016	Achcham Thavir	Contestant	STAR Vijay	
2019	Queen	Renganayagi	MX Player	Web Series
2021	Pandavar Illam	Herself (Special Appearance)	Sun TV	
2021	Ninaithale Inikkum	Guest role	Zee Tamil	
2022	Fall	Malar	Disney+ Hotstar	
2024	Top Cooku Dupe Cooku (season 1)	Contestant	Sun TV	Eliminated Episode 5
2024	Sshhh	Professor Kalyani	Aha Tamil	Season 1
2025	Kayal	Herself (Special Appearance)	Sun TV	
