= Chattam =

- Movie Poster
- Directed by: P.A. Arun Prasad
- Written by: Vishaka Takies
- Produced by: Natti Kumar; Tummalapalli Rama Satyanarayana
- Starring: Jagapathi Babu; Vimala Raman
- Cinematography: Jaswanth
- Edited by: Gautham Raju
- Music by: M. M. Srilekha
- Production company: Vishaka Takies
- Release date: 25 March 2011
- Running time: 109 minutes
- Country: India
- Language: Telugu

Chattam (transl. Law) is a 2011 Indian Telugu-language action film produced by Natti Kumar & Tummalapalli Rama Satyanarayana on Vishaka Talkies banner and directed by P. A. Arun Prasad. Starring Jagapathi Babu and Vimala Raman with music composed by M. M. Srilekha.

== Cast ==
- Jagapati Babu as Gauri Shankar
- Vimala Raman as Sindhu
- Pradeep Rawat as Ramappa
- Ashish Vidyarthi as Shivaji
- Murali Sharma as Sarath Chandra IPS, Superintendent of Police, CB-CID
- Amit Dhawan as Ajmal Kasab
- Chalapathi Rao as Police Commissioner
- Rao Ramesh as Prakash
- Venu Madhav as Badhri
- Brahmanandam as Nandagopal / Nandu
- MS Narayana as Narayana, Shankar's friend
- Raghu Babu as Raghu, Shankar's friend
- Sayaji Shinde as Ramchandra IPS
- Amith
- Vijayachander as Gowri's father
- Prasad Babu as Nanda
- Kondavalasa as Youth Star Rahul
- Jeeva as Constable Ranga Rao
- Raghava as Thief
- Gundu Hanumantha Rao
- Gundu Sudarshan
- Duvvasi Mohan
- Junior Relangi
- Asha Saini as item number
- Siva Parvati
- Meena as Gaowri's sister
- Geetha Singh

== Soundtrack ==
Chattam

Soundtrack album by M. M. Srilekha
- Released: 2011
- Recorded: 2011
- Genre: Soundtrack
- Length: 7:58
- Language: Telugu
- Label: MRT Music
- Producer: M. M. Srilekha

The music and background score were composed by M. M. Srilekha.

All lyrics are written by Bhuvana Chandra.

Track list
No.	Title	Singer(s)	Length
1.	"Dhinthanak Thillana"	M. M. Srilekha, Srikanth	04:04
2.	"Pai Pai Ki"	M. M. Srilekha	03:54
Total length:			7:58
