= Grandma (2022 film) =

2022 Tamil language thriller film

- Release poster
- Directed by: Shijinlal SS
- Written by: Shibi N
- Produced by: Jayaraj R Vinayaka Sunil Kumar
- Starring: Sonia Agarwal; Vimala Raman; Pournami Raj
- Cinematography: Yeshwanth Balaji K
- Edited by: Aswanth Raveendran
- Music by: Jecin George
- Production company: GMA Films
- Distributed by: Action reactions films
- Release date: 8 July 2022
- Country: India
- Language: Tamil

Grandma is a 2022 Indian Tamil-language thriller film directed by Shijinlal and starring Sonia Agarwal, Vimala Raman and Pournami Raj. It was released on 8 July 2022.

== Cast ==
- Sonia Agarwal as Trisha
- Vimala Raman as Priyanka
  - Avanthika as young Priyanka
- Pournami Raj as Nikki
- Charmila as Grandma
- Hemanth Menon as John
- Sreejith Mohan as Martin
- Saandiya Ann Nair as Shwetha
- Kalyani as Maya

== Production ==
Sonia Agarwal agreed terms to work on the film during late 2021. Shijinlal had initially approached Vimala Raman to work with him on a different project, before asking her to join the shoot of Grandma. The film was shot during a 30-day schedule in Kerala.

== Reception ==
The film was released on 27 May 2022 to limited cinema halls across Tamil Nadu, and then re-released on 8 July 2022 to a wider audience. A critic from Maalai Malar gave the film a positive review, revealing that the screenplay was "racy". Logesh Balachandran of The Times of India noted that Grandma was "a decent watch", adding that "the good thing about director Shijinlal's Grandma is that there is neither a flashback for the supernatural element nor a revenge tale". A critic from Aanthai Reporter also praised the film. G.Gowtham Critic from India Herald "Although it is apparent that the director wanted to convey his ideology—that the spirit world is far better than the real one—the plot falls flat in the second half and leaves us wanting more."
