= Prema Sandadi =

Indian Telugu-language romantic action film

- DVD cover
- Directed by: P. A. Arun Prasad
- Written by: P. A. Arun Prasad; Ramesh–Gopi (dialogues)
- Produced by: P. S. N. Dora; S. K. Nayeem
- Starring: Srikanth; Anjala Zhaveri
- Cinematography: S. K. Amar Mukthahar
- Edited by: Nandamuri Hari
- Music by: Koti
- Production company: Aishwarya Movies
- Release date: 19 October 2001
- Country: India
- Language: Telugu

Prema Sandadi (transl. Celebration of love) is a 2001 Indian Telugu-language romantic action film written and directed by P. A. Arun Prasad. The film stars Srikanth and Anjala Zhaveri. The film bears a similar to title to Pelli Sandadi (1996) also starring Srikanth. The film features music composed by Koti.

The film released on 19 October 2001 and was a box office failure.

== Plot ==
In Rayalaseema, two rival factions led by Raghupati Rayudu and Chengal Rayudu are constant tussle with each other. The hostility is continued to the following generations as well with their younger brothers Subba Rayudu and Venkatrayudu taking the lead.

Subba Rayudu's son Krishna has studied MBA in the USA. While returning to his home country he happens to meet Sita, a fellow MBA graduate from Visakhapatnam. However, both of them remain indifferent to each other.

Samara Simha Reddy erroneously informs their families that both of them are in love. While their fathers belong to the opposite sides of the warring factions, they decide to back their children despite their initial disinterest. Krishna slowly begins to like Sita, and she too reciprocates her feelings, eventually falling in love.

== Cast ==
- Srikanth as Krishna
- Anjala Zhaveri as Sita
- Vinod Kumar Alva
- Jayaprakash Reddy as Venkatrayudu
- Captain Raju as Raghupati Rayudu
- Kota Srinivasa Rao as Subba Rayudu
- Mohan Raj
- Brahmanandam
- Giri Babu
- Raghunatha Reddy
- L. B. Sriram
- Mallikarjuna Rao
- Ali
- Sivaji Raja
- Gundu Hanumantha Rao
- Ramya Sri
- Sana
- Master Teja

== Production ==
The film was initially supposed to be directed by Nuvvu Vastavani (2000) fame V. R. Pratap.

== Soundtrack ==
Music composed by Koti.

- "Anukonide" - Udit Narayan, Ganga
- "Karanamgari" - P. Jayachandran
- "Seenugaadi" - S. P. Balasubrahmanyam
- "Gundelo Kottha" - Sriram Prabhu, Ganga
- "Chalo Chalo" - Mano, Sujatha
- "Neelo Palikina" - Tippu, Poornima

== Reception ==
Gudipoodi Srihari of The Hindu opined that "Expectations from Arun Prasad, the director of the hit film Tammudu, were high. But he disappoints with Prema Sandadi. Moreover, he lets the obscenity seep in. The story line is too weak to hold the audience in its grip". Smriti Kashyap of Full Hyderabad wrote that "Avoid the flick unless you are a kamikaze and feel particularly suicidal". Telugu Cinema wrote "The first half of the movie is full of vulgar lines and crude situations. The story picks up in the second half but ends on a predictable note.It is the presence of too many actors that spoils the show and makes it a clamnourous affair".
