= Palakkattu Madhavan =

- Film poster
- Directed by: M Chandramohan
- Written by: M Chandramohan
- Produced by: TCM
- Starring: Vivek; Sonia Agarwal; Sheela
- Cinematography: KS Selvaraj
- Edited by: K. Rajagopal
- Music by: Srikanth Deva
- Production company: TCM
- Distributed by: SSS Entertainments; J. A. Lawrence
- Release date: 3 July 2015 (India)
- Country: India
- Language: Tamil

Palakkattu Madhavan (aka Palakkad Madhavan) is a 2015 Tamil language comedy drama film written and directed by M Chandramohan and produced by TCM. The film stars Vivek as the titular character and Sonia Agarwal in the lead roles, while Sheela essays a supporting role. The music was composed by Srikanth Deva with cinematography by KS Selvaraj and editing by K. Rajagopal. The film released on 3 July 2015.

The character "Palakkattu Madhavan" is also an acknowledgement of a character with the same name in the movie Andha 7 Naatkal starring Bhagyaraj and Ambika.

== Plot ==
Palakattu Madhavan (Vivek) is a lazy, irresponsible man. Embarrassed that his wife Lakshmi (Sonia Agarwal) earns more than he does, he quits his job out of spite. He then adopts the old woman Pattu Maami (Sheela) as a surrogate mother because she offers to pay cash for the opportunity.

== Cast ==
- Vivek as Palakattu Madhavan
- Sonia Agarwal as Lakshmi
- Sheela as Pattu Maami
- Rajendran as U. Santosh Kumar
- Manobala as Madhavan's boss
- Aarthi as Kokilla Maami
- Swaminathan as Vichu Maama
- Cell Murugan as Chittukuruvi
- Crane Manohar as Suppudu
- Imman Annachi as Samuthirapandian
- Karate Raja as Pattu Maami's real son
- Singamuthu as Lingusamy / "Link" Samy
- T. P. Gajendran as Kuberan Travels Owner
- Pandu as Minister's PA
- King Kong as Office Assistant
- Kottachi
- Kovai Senthil
- Kovai Babu
- Abhinayashree (special appearance)

== Production ==
The film began production in June 2014, with M Chandramohan opting to direct a film to be produced by TCM starring Vivek in the lead role.

== Reception ==
Sify gave the film four out of five stars, noting the film engages the audience due to the presence of actor Vivek in the lead role. Times of India generally praised the film but declared its writing somewhat weak and wrote "[t]he entire first half is wasted with redundant scenes that try to tell us what a lazy person Madhavan is." A flaw was noted in writer/director M Chandramohan not developing his characters and letting them remain caricatures. Also, a lack of consistency in their behaviors prevented viewers from caring about them as much as was wished, and it was disliked that the director repeatedly had actor Vivek break the fourth wall for the sake of comedy.

The film collected ₹8 lakh (US$9,500) in Chennai on first day turning out to be a disappointment. The film collected ₹1.2 crore (US$140,000) in the Box Office.

== Soundtrack ==
Music is composed by Srikanth Deva. Anirudh Ravichander has sung "Uchimela" for which Vivek wrote the lyrics.

No.	Song	Singers	Lyrics
1	"Uchimela"	Anirudh Ravichander	Vivekh
2	"Sandhoshame"	Sriram Parthasarathy	Ilayakamban
3	"Eppadi Irundhen"	Gangai Amaran	Ilayakamban
4	"Kannan Pol"	Surmukhi Raman	Vivekh
