= Maa Nanna Chiranjeevi =

- Theatrical release poster
- Directed by: P. A. Arun Prasad
- Written by: P.A. Arun Prasad; P.R. Santosh; P. Narayana Reddy; Swetha Manchiraju; Sreekar Akella (dialogues)
- Based on: The Pursuit of Happyness
- Produced by: Murali Krishna
- Starring: Jagapathi Babu; Neelima; Master Atulith
- Cinematography: Bharani K. Dharan
- Edited by: Basvapedi Reddy
- Music by: Hemachandra
- Production company: Laughing Lords Entertainments
- Release date: 1 January 2010
- Running time: 112 minutes
- Country: India
- Language: Telugu

Maa Nanna Chiranjeevi (transl. My Father is Chiranjeevi) is a 2010 Indian Telugu-language drama film produced by Murali Krishna on Laughing Lords Entertainments banner and directed by P. A. Arun Prasad. Starring Jagapati Babu, Neelima, Master Atulith and music composed by Hemachandra. The film is a remake of 2006 American film The Pursuit of Happyness, starring Will Smith and his son Jaden Smith.

== Cast ==
- Jagapati Babu as Kommalapati Chiranjeevulu
- Neelima as Kommalapati Sandhya
- Master Atulith as Kommalapati Vishwanath
- Brahmanandam as Maniratnam
- Ali as Ram Gopal Varma
- M. S. Narayana as School Principal Rajanala
- Jaya Prakash Reddy as Rohit
- Banerjee
- Rajababu as Sandhya's father
- Satyam Rajesh as Nagesh "Pinku"
- Venu as Basha
- Tirupathi Prakash
- Jogi Naidu as Postman
- Fish Venkat
- Gautam Raju
- Gundu Sudarshan
- Junior Relangi
- Jenny
- Telangana Shakuntala as Didi
- Jhansi as PRO Fathima Sastry
- Bangalore Padma as Sandhya's mother
- Apoorva
- Kalpana
- Ragini
- Poornima
- Nandini Malhotra as Rosy

== Soundtrack ==
Maa Nanna Chiranjeevi

Film score by Hemachandra
- Released: 2008
- Genre: Soundtrack
- Length: 15:04
- Label: Aditya Music
- Producer: Hemachandra

Music composed by Hemachandra. Music released on ADITYA Music Company.

No.	Title	Lyrics	Singer(s)	Length
1.	"Meme Nilabadam"	Bhaskarabhatla	Hemachandra	4:42
2.	"Yemo Yeppudela"	Ramajogayya Sastry	Shankar Mahadevan	4:48
3.	"My Hero"	Bhaskarabhatla	Nikhil D'Souza, Sarath Chandra, Ramya	4:22
4.	"Theme Music"	Instrumental	Music Bit	0:37
5.	"Theme Music-II"	Instrumental	Music Bit	0:35
Total length:				15:04

== Reception ==
A critic from Bangalore Mirror wrote, "The movie was supposed to be a tear jerker but ends up leaving audience confused on whether it's trying to be a movie or a soap opera. The flick is slow-paced with predictable twists".
