= Vimala Raman =

Australian actress and model

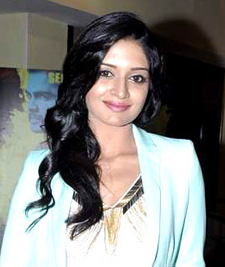
- Raman at a press conference in 2013
- Born: Sydney, Australia
- Occupation: Actress
- Years active: 2006–present
- Spouse: Vinay Rai (relationship)

Vimala Raman is an Australian actress and former model who has worked in Indian cinema. She appears in Malayalam, Telugu, Tamil and Kannada language films. Born and brought up in Australia, she made her debut in 2006 with the Tamil film Poi. An established Bharatanatyam dancer and a graduate in B.Sc Information Systems from the University of New South Wales, Sydney, Raman had also won the title of Miss India Australia in 2004

== Career ==
In February 2016, she acted in the Malayalam film Oppam, along with actor Mohanlal.

== Filmography ==
Key
†	Denotes films that have not yet been released

Year	Title	Role	Language	Notes
2006	Poi	Shilpa	Tamil	Debut film
2007	Time	Vaiga Menon	Malayalam	
2007	Pranayakalam	Maria Varghese	Malayalam	
2007	Sooryan	Maya	Malayalam	
2007	Nasrani	Sarah Eapen	Malayalam	
2007	Romeo	Dr. Priya	Malayalam	
2008	Calcutta News	Smitha	Malayalam	
2008	College Kumaran	Madhavi Menon	Malayalam	
2008	Apoorva	Lakshmi Devi	Malayalam	
2008	Raman Thediya Seethai	Ranjitha	Tamil	
2009	Evaraina Epudaina	Madhumitha	Telugu	
2010	Aptharakshaka	Nagavalli	Kannada	
2010	Gaayam 2	Vidya	Telugu	
2010	Ranga The Donga	Mangamma	Telugu	
2011	Raaj	Priya	Telugu	
2011	Chattam	Sindhu	Telugu	
2011	Dam 999	Meera	English	Dubbed in Malayalam
2012	Kulumanali	Pravallika	Telugu	
2012	Nuvva Nena	Herself	Telugu	Special appearance in the song "Tha Tha Thamara"
2013	Mumbai Mirror	Jia	Hindi	
2013	Chukkalanti Ammayi Chakkanaina Abbayi	Sameera	Telugu	
2013	Amazon Turning Point	Madonna	Malayalam	
2015	Raja Rajendra	Yamuna	Kannada	
2016	Poyi Maranju Parayathe	Swayamprabha	Malayalam	
2016	Oppam	Devayani	Malayalam	
2017	Om Namo Venkatesaya	Shridevi; Padmavathi	Telugu	
2019	Iruttu	Jinn Shaika	Tamil	
2022	Grandma	Priyanka	Tamil	
2023	Asvins	Arthi	Tamil	
2023	Rudrangi	Meera Bhai	Telugu	
2023	Gandeevadhari Arjuna	Dr. Priya Bahadur	Telugu	
2024	Anthima Theerpu	Surya Devara Rathna Prabha	Telugu	
2025	Madharaasi	Sherin	Tamil	
2025	K-Ramp	Steppie	Telugu	Cameo appearance

=== Web series ===
Year	Title	Role	Network	Notes
2021	PubGoa	Aadhira	ZEE5	
