= Sooryan (2007 film) =

- DVD cover
- Directed by: V. M. Vinu
- Written by: Suresh Menon; Satheesh K Sivan
- Produced by: Aroma Mohanan
- Starring: Jayaram; Vimala Raman
- Cinematography: Utpal V. Nayanar
- Edited by: P. C. Mohanan
- Music by: Ilaiyaraja
- Release date: 24 July 2007
- Country: India
- Language: Malayalam

Sooryan is a 2007 Malayalam-language musical action drama film directed by V. M. Vinu, starring Jayaram and Vimala Raman in the lead.

== Plot ==
The film follows Sooryanarayanan, a renowned singer who lives with his mother, his widowed sister Raji and her two children, while his elder sister is married to a businessman named Sundaran.

During a visit to a hospital with his niece, Sooryanarayanan unexpectedly encounters Simon Thekkilakaadan, a wheelchair-bound man accompanied by his sons. The sight of Simon visibly unsettles him, prompting him to hide from the group. On his way home, Sooryanarayanan recalls the events of his past.

In the flashback, Sooryanarayanan is shown as the son and disciple of Harinarayanan, a respected classical musician. Although he aspires to become a singer, he learns that his father has accumulated substantial debts while supporting the family. To help repay the liabilities, Sooryanarayanan takes up employment at a bank.

His life takes an unexpected turn after reuniting with his college friend Cherian, a former minister. Through Cherian, Sooryanarayanan becomes involved in criminal activities and violent conflicts. During this period, he falls in love with Maya, and the two plan to marry.

The relationship comes to an end when Maya and her father witness Sooryanarayanan publicly severing Simon Thekkilakaadan's leg with a sword in retaliation for Simon having previously attacked Cherian and amputated his leg. Believing Sooryanarayanan to be a violent criminal, Maya's father calls off the marriage. The incident deeply shocks Harinarayanan, who suffers a fatal heart attack and dies.

== Cast ==
- Jayaram as Sooryanarayanan (Sooryan)
- Vimala Raman as Maya
- Sai Kumar as Harinarayanan (Sooryan's father)
- Madhupal as Divakaran
- Nandini as Raji
- Harisree Ashokan as Nandhan
- Suresh Krishna as Cherian Veliyathumalil
- Baburaj as Thomas Kadhaliyil
- Kozhikode Narayanan Nair
- Augustine
- Vijayaraghavan as Simon Thekkilakaadan
- Kalaranjini as Sooryan's mother
- Veena
- Zeenath
- Baby Nayanthara as Sooryan's niece
- Archana Menon as Alice
- Baby Riya
- Shajahan Abdulla
- Dinesh Krishnan as DK (cameo)

== Soundtrack ==
1. "Ishtakarrikku"- Madhu Balakrishnan, Manjari
2. "Vasantha Nilave" - Madhu Balakrishnan
3. "Manasse Manasse" - KJ Yesudas
4. "Ambe Vaanee"- KJ Yesudas, Vijay Yesudas
5. "Paattellaam- Chorus, Vijay Yesudas
6. "Shabdamaayi" - Kavalam Sreekumar, Sankaran Namboothiri
