= Thanimai =

2019 Indian film by S. Sivaraman

- Theatrical release poster
- Directed by: S. Sivaraman
- Written by: S. Sivaraman
- Produced by: S.Sundaravalli
- Starring: Sonia Agarwal
- Cinematography: Venkidarshan
- Edited by: Dinesh G
- Music by: Dhina
- Production company: Foot Steps Production
- Release date: 3 May 2019
- Country: India
- Language: Tamil

Thanimai (transl. Loneliness) is a 2019 Indian Tamil-language drama film written and directed by S. Sivaraman. It stars Sonia Agarwal in the lead role with choreographer turned actor Sandy, and Ganja Karuppu in supporting roles. The film follows the life of a Sri Lankan refugee woman in Malaysia who returns to her home country in search of her long-lost child. Principal photography for Thanimai commenced during late 2018. The film was theatrically released on 26 April 2019 as a lone release in Tamil for the week.

== Cast ==
- Sonia Agarwal as Yazhini
- Sandy as Advocate Govindhan
- Ganja Karuppu
- Swaminathan
- Mohan Raman
- Bonda Mani

== Production ==
The film is directed by lawyer turned filmmaker S. Sivaraman and marks his fifth directorial after Kaagitha Kappal and was his first film not to feature newcomers. The first look poster of the film through Twitter was unveiled by Producer G.Dhananjayan on 8 January 2019. The film marks Sonia's first woman-centric lead role film in Tamil. Most of the portions of the film were shot in Rameswaram and in Chennai.

== Soundtrack ==
Soundtrack was composed by Dhina.

- "Enna Pannuna" – Dhina
- "Nangala Gethu" – Gana Vinoth, Rap MC Vicky
- "Veral Regai" – Chinmayi

== Release ==
Agarwal expressed her discontent on the film's low key release citing that it is a good subject.
