= Dasharatha (film) =

- Directed by: M. S. Ramesh
- Produced by: Akshay Mahesh K
- Starring: Ravichandran; Sonia Agarwal; Abhirami
- Narrated by: Darshan
- Music by: Gurukiran
- Production company: M.S.R. Production
- Release date: 5 April 2019
- Country: India
- Language: Kannada

Dasharatha is a 2019 Kannada-language film directed by M. S. Ramesh and starring Ravichandran, Sonia Agarwal, and Abhirami.

== Plot ==
Dashratha, a righteous lawyer, leads a happy life with his wife, son and daughter. The latter completes her college and joins a job soon after. However, trouble begins in their happy life when his daughter falls in love with her employer.

== Cast ==
- Ravichandran as Advocate Dasharatha
- Sonia Agarwal as Kousalya
- Abhirami as Krutika
- Hema Choudhary as Judge
- Meghashree as Dasharatha's daughter
- Rangayana Raghu
- Shobaraj
- Avinash
- Darshan - voice over in climax
- Abhilash

== Production ==
M. S. Ramesh was inspired to make a film with Ravichandran in the role of a lawyer after watching Yuddha Kaanda. Actress Sonia Agarwal returns to Kannada cinema after more than 15 years. The makers asked Darshan to sing a song in the film. The actor initially declined before accepting.

== Soundtrack ==
The music was composed by Gurukiran.

- "Dasharatha" (Title Track) - Darshan
- "Kari Kotu Hakorella" - Gurukiran, Doddappa, Pichalli Srinivas
- "O Jeeva" - Ananya Bhat
- "Jagava Belaguva" - Sanjith Hegde, Chetana Acharya
- "Life is Beautiful" - Anuradha Bhat, Sanjith Hegde

== Release ==
The Times of India gave the film two out of five stars and wrote that "Dasharatha could have been a far more engaging story". The reviewer praised the performances of Sonia Agarwal and Abhirami in their comeback to Kannada cinema. Bangalore Mirror criticized the uninteresting plot while praising the film's dialogues.
