= Mohan Raman =

Indian actor, writer (born 1956)

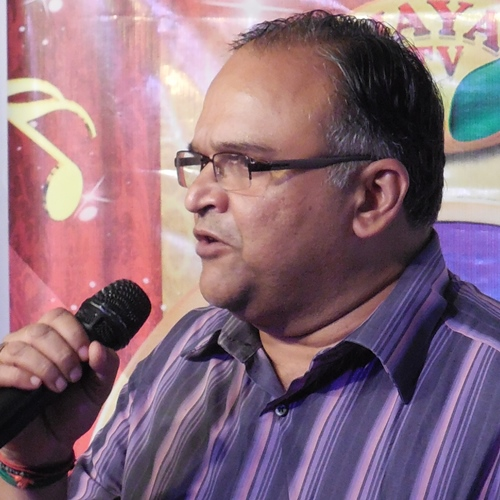
- Mohan Raman at an event
- Born: P. Venkat Raman; 3 April 1956 (age 70); Madras, Madras State, India
- Occupations: Actor; writer
- Years active: 1991–present
- Spouse: Padma
- Children: 2, including Vidyullekha)
- Father: V. P. Raman

Mohan Raman, also known as Mohan V. Raman (born 3 April 1956), is an Indian actor and writer known for his work on Tamil cinema. In 2017 and 2019, he was a Jury member for the National Film Award for Best Writing on Cinema. Raman is a film historian and writes for The Hindu.

== Filmography ==
=== Tamil films ===
List of Mohan Raman Tamil film credits
Year	Title	Role	Notes
1991	Idhayam	Doctor	
1992	Endrum Anbudan	Nandhini's father	
1994	Mahanadhi	Lawyer	
1994	Sethupathi IPS	Police inspector	
1994	Honest Raj	Magistrate Mohandas	
1994	Duet	Guna's father	
1994	Pathavi Pramanam	Governor of Tamil Nadu	
1995	Mr. Madras	Doctor	
1995	Kattumarakaran	Senthilnathan	
1995	Seethanam		
1996	Minor Mappillai	Rajalakshmi's husband	
1996	Tamizh Selvan	Collector	
1996	Sivasakthi		
1996	Senathipathi	Rangachari	
1997	Minsara Kanavu	Amalraj's assistant	
1997	Sishya		
1997	Once More	Tension Thyagarajan	
1997	Nerrukku Ner	Anantharaman	
1997	Aahaa	Vishwanathan Iyer	
1998	Ulavuthurai	Venkatraman	
1998	Thulli Thirintha Kaalam	Sripal	
1998	Harichandra		
1998	Sollamale	Vikram's father	
1998	Guru Paarvai	Pooja's father	
1998	Iniyavale		
1999	Ninaivirukkum Varai	Aravind's father	
1999	Chinna Raja		
1999	Padayappa	Lawyer	
1999	Suyamvaram	Wedding guest	
1999	Malabar Police	Raja's Father	
2000	Kannukkul Nilavu		
2000	Eazhaiyin Sirippil	Doctor	
2000	Kakkai Siraginilae		
2000	Kandukondain Kandukondain	Parameshwaran	
2000	Sabhash	Advocate Mohan	
2000	Rhythm	Srikanth's father	
2001	Little John	Vishwanath	
2001	Asokavanam	Sadasivam	
2001	Paarthale Paravasam		
2002	Devan	Lawyer	
2002	Yai! Nee Romba Azhaga Irukke!	Raji's father	
2003	Magic Magic 3D	Village Head	
2003	Anbe Anbe	Vishali's father	
2003	Anjaneya	Divya's father	
2004	Udhaya	Professor	
2004	Kanavu Meippada Vendum	District collector	
2005	Kundakka Mandakka	Lawyer	
2007	Kalakkura Chandru	Advocate	
2007	Naan Avanillai	Lawyer	
2007	Periyar	B. R. Ambedkar	
2007	Puli Varudhu	Judge	
2008	Kuselan	Ashok Kumar's P.A.	Bilingual film
2009	Satrumun Kidaitha Thagaval	Advocate	
2009	TN 07 AL 4777	P. K. V. Hariharan	
2009	Guru En Aalu	Sheila's Father	
2009	Enga Raasi Nalla Raasi	Police inspector	
2009	Achchamundu! Achchamundu!	Party guest	
2010	Irumbu Kottai Murattu Singam	Sheriff	
2011	Payanam	Mr. Venkat Raman	Bilingual film
2011	Sabash Sariyana Potti	"Sabash Sariyana Potti" judge	
2013	Sokkali		
2014	Malini 22 Palayamkottai	Doctor	Bilingual film
2014	Oru Kanniyum Moonu Kalavaniyum	Kundalakesi	
2014	Ramanujan		
2014	Poriyaalan	Shastri	
2015	Sandamarutham	Subramani	
2015	36 Vayadhinile	Nalabagam Sellur Pichai	
2015	Andhadhi		
2016	Pichaikkaran	Audi car owner	
2016	24	Raghu	
2017	Si3	Judge	
2018	Traffic Ramasamy		
2018	60 Vayadu Maaniram	Balachadran (Balu)	
2018	Kaatrin Mozhi	Viji's father	
2019	Thanimai		
2019	Azhiyatha Kolangal 2	Doctor	
2020	Ka Pae Ranasingam	Judge	
2021	Cinderella	Advocate	
2022	Rocketry: The Nambi Effect	Udupi Ramachandra Rao	
2022	Laththi	Police inspector	
2022	Ponniyin Selvan: I	Aniruddha Brahmarayar	
2023	Ponniyin Selvan: II	Aniruddha Brahmarayar	
2023	Pichaikkaran 2	Lawyer	
2023	Sarakku	Advocate Mohan Raman	
2024	Rathnam	Rathnam's uncle	
2024	Maharaja	Doctor	
2025	Test	Venkataraman	
2025	Red Flower		
2025	Will	Mohan	
2026	Anantha	Doctor	Uncredited role
2026	Angikaaram	Judge	
2026	Enna Vilai		

Key
†	Denotes films that have not yet been released

=== Hindi films ===
List of Mohan Raman Hindi film credits
Year	Title	Role
1995	Sabse Bada Khiladi	Defense Lawyer
2005	White Rainbow	TV Presenter Balaji Srinivasan
2009	Ajab Prem Ki Ghazab Kahani	Seshadri
2013	Chennai Express	Village Priest
2017	Golmaal Again	Ram Krishna Iyer (Ghost)
2022	Rocketry: The Nambi Effect	Udupi Ramachandra Rao

=== Telugu films ===
List of Mohan Raman Telugu film credits
Year	Title	Role	Notes
2008	Kathanayakudu	Ashok Kumar's P.A.	Bilingual films
2011	Gaganam	Mr. Venkat Ram	Bilingual films
2016	Ghatana	Chief Doctor	Bilingual films
2017	Kaadhali	Bandhavi's father	
2025	Meghalu Cheppina Prema Katha	Estate Manager	

=== English films ===
List of Mohan Raman English film credit
Year	Title	Role	Notes
1992	Ele, My Friend		
2011	Help	Airport security officer	short film

=== Dubbing artist ===
- Raghuvir Yadav (Uyire)
- Girish Karnad (Amirtham)
- Tanikella Bharani (Dhoni, Vaikuntapuram)
- Suresh Krishnamoorthi (Pulan Visaranai 2)

=== Television ===
List of Mohan Raman television credits
Television series	Year	Role	Notes
Marmadesam – Ragasiyam	1995	Dr. Vishwaram (Jr. Psychiatrist)	
Marmadesam – Vidathu Karuppu	1997	Dr.Nanda (Reena & Rathna's Superstitious Mentor)	
Kadhal Pagadai	1997–1998	Ramany	
Premi	1997	second hand car dealer and anonymous caller	
Mr. Brain	1997	Nagarajan	
Nimmathi Ungal Choice - 3	1999	Balachadran	episode 11
Chithi	1999–2001	Prabhavathy's Lawyer Manickavelu	
Gopi	2000–2001	Naatamai	
Nambikkai	2001–2002	Advocate Krishna	
Chinna Papa Periya Papa	2002–2004	Vasudevan (Loosu Devan)	
Aasai	2003	Rajan, Kannan's father	
Anandham	2003–2009	Srinivasan	
Janaki	2003–2004	Rathnam, Janaki and Nandini's father	
Chidambara Rahasiyam	2004–2006	Kumaraguru	
Alli Raajiyam	2005–2006	Gulabi Seth	
Chellamadi Nee Enakku	2006–2008	Subramani	
Vaira Nenjam	2007–2009	Manicka vinayagam (dubbed as aadajanma on Star Maa and Swarna Manasu on Asianet)	
Arasi	2009	Thyagarajan	
Mama Mappla	2010–2011	Rajasekhar	
Karthigai Deepam	2023	Chidhambaram	
