= Chandu (2002 film) =

- DVD Cover
- Directed by: Arun Prasad P.A.
- Written by: M. S. Ramesh R. Rajashekhar (Dialogues)
- Screenplay by: Arun Prasad. P. A.
- Story by: Arun Prasad. P. A.
- Produced by: Sa Ra Govindu
- Starring: Sudeep; Sonia Agarwal
- Cinematography: Sundarnath Suvarna
- Edited by: S. Manohar
- Music by: Gurukiran
- Production company: Tanu Chithra
- Distributed by: Ramu Films
- Release date: 10 May 2002
- Running time: 136 minutes
- Country: India
- Language: Kannada

Chandu is a 2002 Kannada romantic-drama film directed by Arun Prasad P.A. in his Kannada debut, featuring Sudeep and Sonia Agarwal. The film features background score and soundtrack composed by Gurukiran and lyrics by K. Kalyan, Anant Kumar and V. Nagendra Prasad. The film was released on 10 May 2002.

== Plot ==
A reckless guy named Chandu (Sudeep) has to deal with the misunderstanding between him and his lover Vidya(Sonia).

== Cast ==
- Sudeep as Chandrashekar "Chandu"
- Sonia Agarwal as Vidya
- Siri as Sowmya, Vidya's cousin
- Srinath as Vidya's father
- Ramesh Bhat as Kumar, Chandu's brother-in-law
- Lohithaswa as Chandu's father
- Avinash as Swathi's father
- Arun Sagar as Clinton, Chandu's friend
- Sadhu Kokila as Thimma, servant
- Umashree as Mary, women's hostel warden
- Chitra Shenoy as Vidya's mother
- Shanoor Sana as Chandu's sister
- Chethan as Soori
- Amoolya as Akki, Chandu's niece
- Kishan Shrikanth as Bablu, Chandu's nephew (credited as Master Kishan)

== Production ==
This film marked the Kannada debut of Telugu director P. A. Arun Prasad and also his first collaboration with Sudeep. Sonia Agarwal made her Kannada debut through this film. The film's launch, at Jade Garden, was attended by producers such as S. A. Govind Raj, Channegowda, K. C. N. Chandrashekar, Rockline Venkatesh, T. Nanjunda Shetty, Ravi, and Siddalingaiah.

== Soundtrack ==
The soundtrack was composed by Gurukiran in his first collaboration with both Sudeep and Arun Prasad.

Chandu

Soundtrack album by Gurukiran
- Released: 2002
- Recorded: Ashwini Recording Company
- Genre: Feature film soundtrack
- Length: 22:09
- Language: Kannada
- Label: Ashwini Audio
- Producer: Gurukiran

Gurukiran chronology
Appu (2002)	Chandu (2002)	Thuntata (2002)

The soundtrack was released by Ashwini Audio label.

Track listing
No.	Title	Lyrics	Singer(s)	Length
1.	"Avala Olava Nage"	V. Nagendra Prasad	Rajesh Krishnan
2.	"Oh Raviye Idu Entha"	K. Kalyan	Gurukiran
3.	"Saddillade Moodide Prema"	Ananthkumar	Udit Narayan, Sowmya Raoh
4.	"Kanyakumariye"	V. Nagendra Prasad	Udit Narayan, Anuradha Sriram
5.	"Sontada Vishya"	V. Nagendra Prasad	Sudeep

== Reception ==
A critic from Chitraloka.com wrote that "A few lovely scores, action extravaganza and well-weighed acting by key artistes is the highlight of ‘Chandu’".
