= Yuvan Shankar Raja discography =

List of musical works by Yuvan Shankar Raja

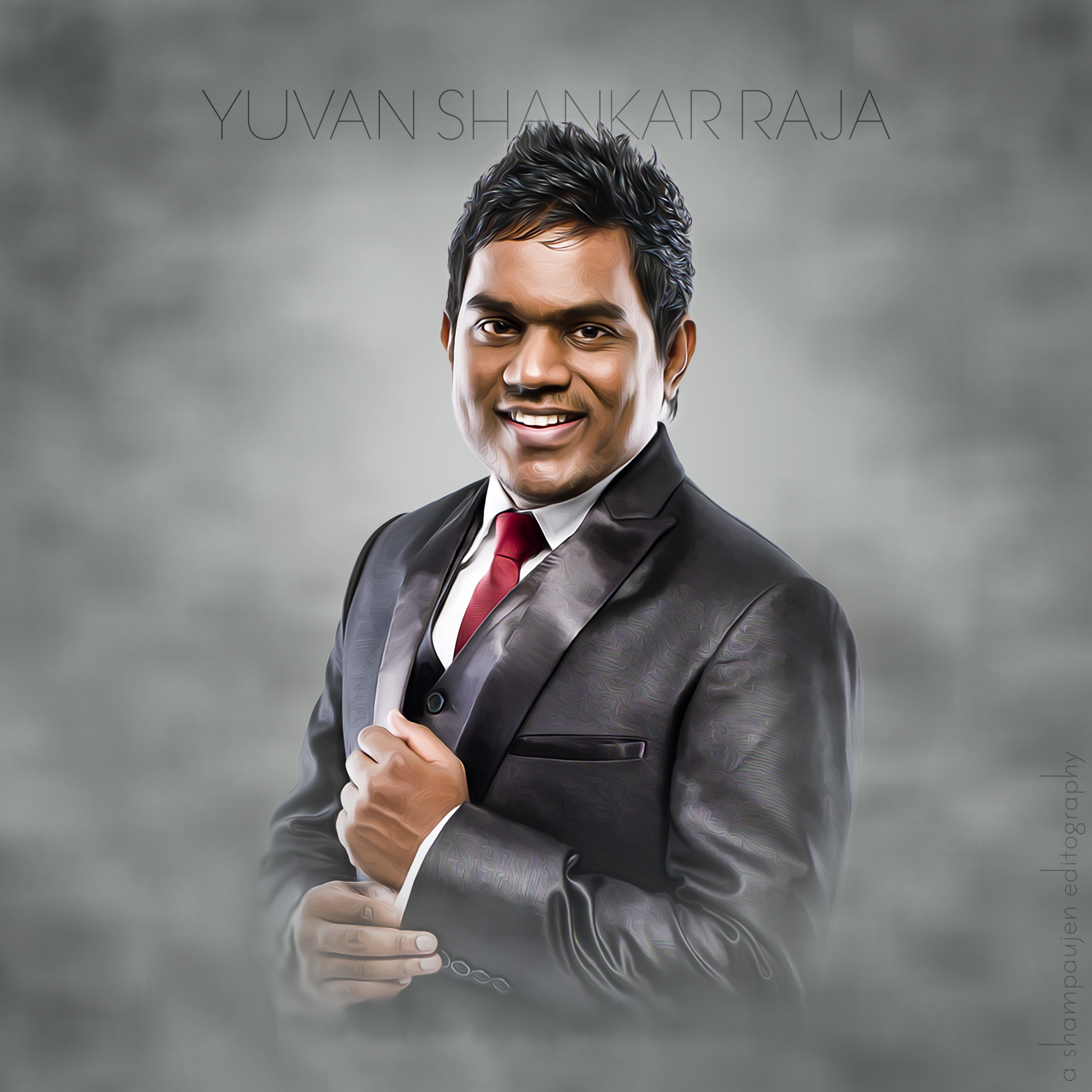
Yuvan Shankar Raja

Yuvan Shankar Raja made his debut in the Indian music industry with the 1997 Tamil film Aravindhan. He has composed and produced film scores, soundtracks and songs for more than 200 films in various languages, predominantly in Tamil films apart from a few Telugu, Kannada and Hindi films.

== As composer ==
- The films are listed based on their release order, not the soundtrack release year.

=== 1990s ===
List of Yuvan Shankar Raja 1990s feature film credits as composer
Year	Title	Language	Notes	Ref.
1997	Aravindhan	Tamil	Debut	
1998	Velai	Tamil		
1998	Kalyana Galatta	Tamil		
1999	Poovellam Kettuppar	Tamil		
1999	Unakkaga Ellam Unakkaga	Tamil		

=== 2000s ===
List of Yuvan Shankar Raja 2000s feature film credits as composer
Year	Title	Language	Notes	Ref.
2001	Dheena	Tamil		
2001	Rishi	Tamil		
2001	Manadhai Thirudivittai	Tamil		
2001	Nandhaa	Tamil		
2002	Seshu	Telugu	Telugu debut 4 out of 8 songs; Rest of 4 songs reused from the original Tamil film	
2002	Malli Malli Chudali	Telugu	Reused 1 song from Manadhai Thirudivittai and 1 song from Thulluvadho Ilamai	
2002	Junior Senior	Tamil		
2002	Thulluvadho Ilamai	Tamil		
2002	April Maadhathil	Tamil		
2002	Bala	Tamil		
2002	Mounam Pesiyadhe	Tamil		
2003	Pop Carn	Tamil		
2003	Punnagai Poove	Tamil		
2003	Pudhiya Geethai	Tamil	Only songs	
2003	Kaadhal Kondein	Tamil		
2003	Thennavan	Tamil		
2003	Aadanthe Ado Type	Tamil	4 songs reused from Mounam Pesiyadhe, 1 song reused from Manadhai Thirudivittai	
2003	Winner	Tamil		
2003	Kurumbu	Tamil		
2003	Five by Four	English		
2004	Pudhukottaiyilirundhu Saravanan	Tamil		
2004	Ethiree	Tamil		
2004	Perazhagan	Tamil		
2004	Bose	Tamil		
2004	7G Rainbow Colony	Tamil, Telugu	Bilingual in Telugu as 7G Brindavan Colony	
2004	Adhu	Tamil		
2004	Manmadhan	Tamil		
2005	Raam	Tamil		
2005	Arinthum Ariyamalum	Tamil		
2005	Daas	Tamil		
2005	Oru Kalluriyin Kathai	Tamil		
2005	Thotti Jaya	Tamil	1 song only, Composed with Harris Jayaraj	
2005	Kanda Naal Mudhal	Tamil		
2005	Sandakozhi	Tamil		
2006	Happy	Telugu		
2006	Kalvanin Kadhali	Tamil		
2006	Pattiyal	Tamil		
2006	Raam	Telugu	Only songs	
2006	Azhagai Irukkirai Bayamai Irukkirathu	Tamil		
2006	Pudhupettai	Tamil		
2006	Thimiru	Tamil		
2006	Kedi	Tamil		
2006	Vallavan	Tamil		
2006	Madana	Kannada	Remake of Manmadhan	
2007	Thaamirabharani	Tamil		
2007	Deepavali	Tamil		
2007	Agaram	Tamil	Soundtrack released in 2005	
2007	Paruthiveeran	Tamil		
2007	Chennai 600028	Tamil	Only songs	
2007	Aadavari Matalaku Ardhalu Verule	Telugu		
2007	Raju Bhai	Telugu		
2007	Thottal Poo Malarum	Tamil		
2007	Satham Podathey	Tamil		
2007	Kattradhu Thamizh	Tamil		
2007	Kannamoochi Yenada	Tamil		
2007	Vel	Tamil		
2007	Machakaaran	Tamil		
2007	Billa	Tamil		
2008	Vaazhthugal	Tamil		
2008	Yaaradi Nee Mohini	Tamil	Remake of Adavari Matlaku Arthale Verule	
2008	Saroja	Tamil		
2008	Aegan	Tamil		
2008	Silambattam	Tamil		
2009	Siva Manasula Sakthi	Tamil		
2009	Kunguma Poovum Konjum Puravum	Tamil		
2009	Sarvam	Tamil		
2009	Muthirai	Tamil		
2009	Oy!	Telugu		
2009	Vaamanan	Tamil		
2009	Gilli	Kannada	Remake of 7G Rainbow Colony	
2009	Yogi	Tamil		

=== 2010s ===
List of Yuvan Shankar Raja 2010s feature film credits as composer
Year	Title	Language	Notes	Ref.
2010	Goa	Tamil		
2010	Striker	Hindi	Hindi debut Guest composer; 1 song only	
2010	Theeradha Vilaiyattu Pillai	Tamil		
2010	Paiyaa	Tamil		
2010	Thillalangadi	Tamil	4 out of 7 songs, Composed with Thaman S	
2010	Baana Kaathadi	Tamil		
2010	Kaadhal Solla Vandhen	Tamil		
2010	Naan Mahaan Alla	Tamil		
2010	Boss Engira Bhaskaran	Tamil		
2011	Pathinaaru	Tamil		
2011	Vaanam	Tamil		
2011	Jolly Boy	Kannada	Remake of Pathinaaru	
2011	Aaranya Kaandam	Tamil		
2011	Avan Ivan	Tamil		
2011	Mankatha	Tamil		
2011	Panjaa	Telugu		
2011	Rajapattai	Tamil		
2012	Vettai	Tamil		
2012	Mr. Nookayya	Telugu		
2012	Kazhugu	Tamil		
2012	Ullam	Tamil	Soundtrack released in 2004	
2012	Billa II	Tamil		
2012	Dhenikaina Ready	Telugu	Guest composer; 2 songs only	
2013	Samar	Tamil		
2013	Ameerin Aadhi Baghavan	Tamil		
2013	Kedi Billa Killadi Ranga	Tamil		
2013	Moondru Per Moondru Kaadhal	Tamil		
2013	Thillu Mullu	Tamil	Composed with M. S. Viswanathan	
2013	Aadhalal Kadhal Seiveer	Tamil		
2013	Thanga Meenkal	Tamil		
2013	Arrambam	Tamil		
2013	Biriyani	Tamil		
2014	Ajith	Kannada	Remake of Paiyaa, Only songs	
2014	Vadacurry	Tamil	1 song only	
2014	Anjaan	Tamil		
2014	Raja Natwarlal	Hindi	Only songs	
2014	Vanavarayan Vallavarayan	Tamil		
2014	Govindudu Andarivadele	Telugu		
2014	Poojai	Tamil		
2014	Thirudan Police	Tamil		
2015	Vai Raja Vai	Tamil		
2015	Masss	Tamil		
2015	Yatchan	Tamil		
2016	Dharma Durai	Tamil		
2016	Chennai 600028 II	Tamil		
2017	Yaakkai	Tamil		
2017	Kadamban	Tamil		
2017	Sathriyan	Tamil		
2017	Anbanavan Asaradhavan Adangadhavan	Tamil		
2017	Taramani	Tamil		
2017	Oxygen	Telugu		
2017	Gowdru Hotel	Kannada		
2017	Balloon	Tamil		
2018	Peranbu	Tamil		
2018	Irumbu Thirai	Tamil		
2018	Semma Botha Aagathey	Tamil		
2018	Pyaar Prema Kaadhal	Tamil		
2018	Raja Ranguski	Tamil		
2018	Sandakozhi 2	Tamil		
2018	Genius	Tamil		
2018	Maari 2	Tamil		
2019	Kanne Kalaimaane	Tamil		
2019	Super Deluxe	Tamil		
2019	NGK	Tamil		
2019	Sindhubaadh	Tamil		
2019	Kazhugu 2	Tamil		
2019	Nerkonda Paarvai	Tamil		
2019	Hero	Tamil		

=== 2020s ===
List of Yuvan Shankar Raja 2020s feature film credits as composer
Year	Title	Language	Notes	Ref.
2020	Meendum Oru Mariyathai	Tamil	Guest composer; 1 song only	
2021	Koozhangal	Tamil		
2021	Kalathil Santhippom	Tamil		
2021	Chakra	Tamil		
2021	Nenjam Marappathillai	Tamil	Soundtrack released in 2016	
2021	Sulthan	Tamil	Background score only	
2021	Kasada Tabara	Tamil	Streaming release; Segment: "Kavasam"	
2021	Dikkiloona	Tamil		
2021	Maanaadu	Tamil		
2021	Plan Panni Pannanum	Tamil		
2022	1945	Tamil, Telugu		
2022	Veeramae Vaagai Soodum	Tamil		
2022	Valimai	Tamil	Only songs	
2022	Maamanithan	Tamil	Composed with Ilaiyaraaja	
2022	Kuruthi Aattam	Tamil		
2022	Viruman	Tamil		
2022	Naane Varuvean	Tamil		
2022	Love Today	Tamil		
2022	Coffee with Kadhal	Tamil		
2022	Agent Kannayiram	Tamil		
2022	Laththi	Tamil		
2023	Custody	Telugu, Tamil	Only 1 song, Composed with Ilaiyaraaja	
2023	Bommai	Tamil		
2023	Paramporul	Tamil		
2023	Iraivan	Tamil		
2023	Conjuring Kannappan	Tamil		
2024	Pon Ondru Kanden	Tamil		
2024	Star	Tamil		
2024	Garudan	Tamil		
2024	Gangs of Godavari	Telugu		
2024	The Greatest of All Time	Tamil		
2025	Nesippaya	Tamil		
2025	Aghathiyaa	Tamil		
2025	Sweetheart!	Tamil		
2025	Paranthu Po	Tamil	Background score only	
2025	Maareesan	Tamil		
2025	Mr Zoo Keeper	Tamil		
2025	Kombuseevi	Tamil		
2026	Pyaar Prema Kalyanam	Tamil		
2026	Yezhu Kadal Yezhu Malai	Tamil	4 songs only; background score for some portions	

=== Upcoming projects ===
List of Yuvan Shankar Raja upcoming film projects
Year	Title	Director	Language	Status	Ref.
2027	Jolliya Iruntha Oruthan	M. Rajesh	Tamil	Post-production	
2027	Raja's Playlist	Sujith N Subramaniam	Tamil	Post-production	
2027	Bang Bang	Sam Rodrigues	Tamil	Post-production	
2027	Paripadi	Joju George	Malayalam	Filming	
2027	7/G Rainbow Colony 2	Selvaraghavan	Tamil	Filming	
2027	Sengulam	Chinnasamy Ponnaiah	Tamil	Filming	
TBA	Texla	Aishwarya Rajinikanth	Tamil	Filming	
TBA	City of Gold	Siddharth	Tamil	Filming	
TBA	Sound Engineer	Chinimilli Manikumar	Telugu	Filming	
TBA	Untitled Romeo Pictures #11	Franklin Jacob	Tamil	Filming	
TBA	Non Violence	Ananda Krishnan	Tamil	Delayed	
TBA	Adhirshtasaali	Mithran R. Jawahar	Tamil	Delayed	
TBA	Maayavalai	Ramesh Balakrishnan	Tamil	Delayed	
TBA	Iraivan Miga Periyavan	Ameer	Tamil	Delayed	

=== Unreleased Projects ===
- List of unreleased films with soundtracks already out.

Year	Title	Language	Status/|Notes	Ref.
2002	Kadhal Samrajyam	Tamil	Shelved	
2011	Pesu	Tamil	Shelved	
2011	Kadhal 2 Kalyanam	Tamil	Shelved	
2014	Idam Porul Yaeval	Tamil	Production issues	
2017	Santhanathevan	Tamil	Shelved (only one song released)	
2018	Peipasi	Tamil	Shelved	

=== Web series ===
List of Yuvan Shankar Raja web series credits
Year	Series	Platform	Notes	Ref.
2023	Modern Love Chennai	Amazon Prime Video	Title Track and Segment: "Imaigal"	
2024	Parachute	Disney+ Hotstar		
TBA	Nilamellaam Rattham	ZEE5	With Ameer and Vetrimaaran	

== As a playback singer ==
=== Film songs ===
==== 1980s ====
Year	Album	No	Song	Language	Composer(s)	Ref.
1988	En Bommukutty Ammavukku	1	"Yaiyaiya Yaiyaiya"	Tamil	Ilaiyaraaja	
1989	Thendral Sudum	2	"Dhoori Dhoori"	Tamil	Ilaiyaraaja	

==== 1990s ====
Year	Album	No	Song	Language	Composer(s)	Ref.
1990	Anjali	3	"Something Something"	Tamil	Ilaiyaraaja	
1990	Anjali	4	"Iravu Nilavu"	Tamil	Ilaiyaraaja	
1990	Anjali	5	"Motta Maadi"	Tamil	Ilaiyaraaja	
1990	Anjali	6	"Vaanam Namakku"	Tamil	Ilaiyaraaja	
1990	Anjali	7	"Anjali Anjali"	Tamil	Ilaiyaraaja	
1990	Chatriyan	8	"Yaaru Pottadhu"	Tamil	Ilaiyaraaja	
1991	Thalattu Ketkuthamma	9	"Sonna Petcha"	Tamil	Ilaiyaraaja	
1996	Alexander	10	"Alexander"	Tamil	Karthik Raja	
1997	Aravindhan	11	"Hey Ponnamma"	Tamil	Yuvan Shankar Raja	
1997	Vasuke	12	"Adida Sight"	Tamil	Ilaiyaraaja	
1998	Naam Iruvar Namakku Iruvar	13	"Nadanakalarani"	Tamil	Karthik Raja	
1998	Velai	14	"Achutha Achutha"	Tamil	Yuvan Shankar Raja	
1998	Poonthottam	15	"New Year"	Tamil	Ilaiyaraaja	
1998	Kumbakonam Gopalu	16	"Golmal Gopal"	Tamil	Ilaiyaraaja	
1999	Unakkaga Ellam Unakkaga	17	"Cleopatra"	Tamil	Yuvan Shankar Raja	

==== 2000s ====
Year	Album	No	Song	Language	Composer(s)	Ref.
2001	Dheena	18	"Kathal Website Ondru"	Tamil	Yuvan Shankar Raja	
2001	Dheena	19	"Nee Illai Endraal"	Tamil	Yuvan Shankar Raja	
2001	Friends	20	"Rukku Rukku"	Tamil	Ilaiyaraaja	
2001	Ullam Kollai Poguthae	21	"Kinguda Kinguda"	Tamil	Karthik Raja	
2001	Manadhai Thirudivittai	22	"All Day Jolly Day"	Tamil	Yuvan Shankar Raja	
2001	Kaathal Jaathi	23	"Anne Anne"	Tamil	Ilaiyaraaja	
2001	Kaathal Jaathi	24	"Pottalu Kattula"	Tamil	Ilaiyaraaja	
2002	Seshu	25	"Aakasam Kindundi"	Telugu	Yuvan Shankar Raja	
2002	Malli Malli Chudali	26	"Ivi Mallela"	Telugu	Yuvan Shankar Raja	
2002	Junior Senior	27	"Oh Shalalala Jamaai"	Tamil	Yuvan Shankar Raja	
2002	Thulluvadho Ilamai	28	"Idhu Kaadhala"	Tamil	Yuvan Shankar Raja	
2002	Thulluvadho Ilamai	29	"Kann Munney"	Tamil	Yuvan Shankar Raja	
2002	Thulluvadho Ilamai	30	"Vaanam Oru"	Tamil	Yuvan Shankar Raja	
2002	Ramanaa	31	"Angey Yaaru Paaru"	Tamil	Ilaiyaraaja	
2002	April Maadhathil	32	"Poi Solla Manasukku"	Tamil	Yuvan Shankar Raja	
2002	Bala	33	"Bailamo"	Tamil	Yuvan Shankar Raja	
2002	Mounam Pesiyadhe	34	"Chinna Chinnathai"	Tamil	Yuvan Shankar Raja	
2002	Mounam Pesiyadhe	35	"Ilamai Oorai Sutrum"	Tamil	Yuvan Shankar Raja	
2002	Mounam Pesiyadhe	36	"Love All Day"	Tamil	Yuvan Shankar Raja	
2003	Punnagai Poove	37	"Venus Venus Pennae"	Tamil	Yuvan Shankar Raja	
2003	Punnagai Poove	38	"En Kaadhal"	Tamil	Yuvan Shankar Raja	
2003	Kadhal Kondein	39	"18 Vayathil"	Tamil	Yuvan Shankar Raja	
2003	Kadhal Kondein	40	"Thathi Thathi"	Tamil	Yuvan Shankar Raja	
2003	Kadhal Kondein	41	"Kai Padamalae"	Tamil	Yuvan Shankar Raja	
2003	Kurumbu	42	"Kingini Mingini"	Tamil	Yuvan Shankar Raja	
2003	Dhanush	43	"Nillu Nillu"	Tamil	Ilaiyaraaja	
2004	Pudhukottaiyilirundhu Saravanan	44	"Baby Baby"	Tamil	Yuvan Shankar Raja	
2004	Pudhukottaiyilirundhu Saravanan	45	"Where Do We Go"	Tamil	Yuvan Shankar Raja	
2004	7G Rainbow Colony	46	"Naam Vayathukku"	Tamil	Yuvan Shankar Raja	
2004	Manmadhan	47	"Kannale"	Tamil	Yuvan Shankar Raja	
2004	Manmadhan	48	"Pesamalae Mugam"	Tamil	Yuvan Shankar Raja	
2005	Raam	49	"Boom Boom"	Tamil	Yuvan Shankar Raja	
2005	Raam	50	"Nizhalinai Nijamum"	Tamil	Yuvan Shankar Raja	
2005	Arinthum Ariyamalum	51	"En Kannodu"	Tamil	Yuvan Shankar Raja	
2005	Kanda Naal Mudhal	52	"Pushing It Hard"	Tamil	Yuvan Shankar Raja	
2006	Happy	53	"Ossa Re"	Telugu	Yuvan Shankar Raja	
2006	Kalvanin Kadhali	54	"Eno Kangal"	Tamil	Yuvan Shankar Raja	
2006	Pattiyal	55	"Yedhedo Ennangal Vandhu"	Tamil	Yuvan Shankar Raja	
2006	Pattiyal	56	"Kannai Vittu Kann Imaigal"	Tamil	Yuvan Shankar Raja	
2006	Pattiyal	57	"Kannai Vittu Kann Imaigal (Remix)"	Tamil	Yuvan Shankar Raja	
2006	Raam	58	"Qurbani"	Telugu	Yuvan Shankar Raja	
2006	Azhagai Irukkirai Bayamai Irukkirathu	59	"Kanavae Kalaigirathe"	Tamil	Yuvan Shankar Raja	
2006	Azhagai Irukkirai Bayamai Irukkirathu	60	"Elaiyudhir Kaalam"	Tamil	Yuvan Shankar Raja	
2006	Azhagai Irukkirai Bayamai Irukkirathu	61	"Kaadhalai Pirippadhu"	Tamil	Yuvan Shankar Raja	
2006	Azhagai Irukkirai Bayamai Irukkirathu	62	"Odivaa Kaadhalae"	Tamil	Yuvan Shankar Raja	
2006	Azhagai Irukkirai Bayamai Irukkirathu	63	"Orampo Naina"	Tamil	Yuvan Shankar Raja	
2006	Pudhupettai	64	Our Story: "Enga Yeriya"	Tamil	Yuvan Shankar Raja	
2006	Pudhupettai	65	It All Comes Down To this!: "Oru Naalil"	Tamil	Yuvan Shankar Raja	
2006	Pudhupettai	66	Gangster's Marriage Party: "Pul Pesum Poo Pesum"	Tamil	Yuvan Shankar Raja	
2006	Pudhupettai	67	"Oru Naalil": Composer's Dream Mix	Tamil	Yuvan Shankar Raja	
2006	Vallavan	68	"Kadhal Vandhale"	Tamil	Yuvan Shankar Raja	
2007	Deepavali	69	"Pogadhey"	Tamil	Yuvan Shankar Raja	
2007	Paruthiveeran	70	"Iayyayo"	Tamil	Yuvan Shankar Raja	
2007	Chennai 600028	71	"Natpukkullae"	Tamil	Yuvan Shankar Raja	
2007	Chennai 600028	72	"Ulle Vaa"	Tamil	Yuvan Shankar Raja	
2007	Raju Bhai	73	"Evvare Nuvvu (Remix)"	Tamil	Yuvan Shankar Raja	
2007	Thottal Poo Malarum	74	"Arabu Naade"	Tamil	Yuvan Shankar Raja	
2007	Thottal Poo Malarum	75	"Vittal Suriyanai"	Tamil	Yuvan Shankar Raja	
2007	Satham Podathey	76	"O Indha Kaadhal"	Tamil	Yuvan Shankar Raja	
2007	Kattradhu Thamizh	77	"Innum Oru Iravu"	Tamil	Yuvan Shankar Raja	
2007	Kattradhu Thamizh	78	"Unakkagathane Intha"	Tamil	Yuvan Shankar Raja	
2008	Yaaradi Nee Mohini	79	"The Person Is The Looser"	Tamil	Yuvan Shankar Raja	
2008	Saroja	80	"Cheeky Cheeky"	Tamil	Yuvan Shankar Raja	
2008	Aegan	81	"Kichu Kichu"	Tamil	Yuvan Shankar Raja	
2009	Siva Manasula Sakthi	82	"Oru Kal"	Tamil	Yuvan Shankar Raja	
2009	Kunguma Poovum Konjum Puravum	83	"Kadaloram Oru Ooru"	Tamil	Yuvan Shankar Raja	
2009	Sarvam	84	"Neethane"	Tamil	Yuvan Shankar Raja	
2009	Sarvam	85	"Kaatrukulle"	Tamil	Yuvan Shankar Raja	
2009	Oy!	86	"Povadhe Prema"	Telugu	Yuvan Shankar Raja	
2009	Yogi	87	"Yaarodu Yaaro"	Tamil	Yuvan Shankar Raja	

==== 2010s ====
Year	Album	No	Song	Language	Composer(s)	Ref.
2010	Goa	88	"Yezhezhu Thalaimuraikkum"	Tamil	Yuvan Shankar Raja	
2010	Goa	89	"Kaadhal Endral"	Tamil	Yuvan Shankar Raja	
2010	Goa	90	"Goa remix"	Tamil	Yuvan Shankar Raja	
2010	Striker	91	"Haq Se"	Hindi	Yuvan Shankar Raja	
2010	Theeradha Vilaiyattu Pillai	92	"Introduction"	Tamil	Yuvan Shankar Raja	
2010	Theeradha Vilaiyattu Pillai	93	"Poo Mudhal Pen Varai"	Tamil	Yuvan Shankar Raja	
2010	Theeradha Vilaiyattu Pillai	94	"Theriyamele"	Tamil	Yuvan Shankar Raja	
2010	Paiyaa	95	"En Kadhal Solla"	Tamil	Yuvan Shankar Raja	
2010	Paiyaa	96	"Yedho Ondru"	Tamil	Yuvan Shankar Raja	
2010	Paiyaa	97	"Nee Yadalo Naaku" (D)	Telugu	Yuvan Shankar Raja	
2010	Thillalangadi	98	"Sol Pechu"	Tamil	Yuvan Shankar Raja	
2010	Baana Kaathadi	99	"Thaakkuthe Kann Thaakkuthe"	Tamil	Yuvan Shankar Raja	
2010	Kaadhal Solla Vandhen	100	"Oh Shala"	Tamil	Yuvan Shankar Raja	
2010	Naan Mahaan Alla	101	"Iragai Pole"	Tamil	Yuvan Shankar Raja	
2010	Siddhu +2	102	"Poove Poove"	Tamil	Dharan Kumar	
2011	Pesu	103	"Vennira Iravuga"	Tamil	Yuvan Shankar Raja	
2011	Pathinaaru	104	"Yaar Solli Kadhal"	Tamil	Yuvan Shankar Raja	
2011	Pathinaaru	105	"Theme music"	Tamil	Yuvan Shankar Raja	
2011	Vaanam	106	"Evan Di Unna Pethan"	Tamil	Yuvan Shankar Raja	
2011	Vaanam	107	"Vaanam"	Tamil	Yuvan Shankar Raja	
2011	Kadhal 2 Kalyanam	108	"Naa Vetta Pora Aadu"	Tamil	Yuvan Shankar Raja	
2011	Mankatha	109	"Vilaiyaadu Mankatha"	Tamil	Yuvan Shankar Raja	
2011	Mankatha	110	"Nanbane"	Tamil	Yuvan Shankar Raja	
2011	Mankatha	111	"Vilaiyaadu Mankatha (Extended Dance Mix)" (Remixed by Premgi Amaren)	Tamil	Yuvan Shankar Raja	
2011	Panjaa	112	"Panjaa"	Telugu	Yuvan Shankar Raja	
2011	Panjaa	113	"Panjaa (Remix)"	Telugu	Yuvan Shankar Raja	
2012	Vettai	114	"Pappappa"	Tamil	Yuvan Shankar Raja	
2012	Mr. Nookayya	115	"Pista Pista"	Telugu	Yuvan Shankar Raja	
2012	Mr. Nookayya	116	"Pranam Poye Badha"	Telugu	Yuvan Shankar Raja	
2012	Kazhugu	117	"Paathagathi Kannupattu"	Tamil	Yuvan Shankar Raja	
2012	Billa II	118	"Gangster"	Tamil	Yuvan Shankar Raja	
2012	Billa II	119	"Yedho Mayakkam"	Tamil	Yuvan Shankar Raja	
2012	Denikaina Ready	120	"Pilla Neevalla"	Telugu	Yuvan Shankar Raja	
2012	Veyilodu Vilayadu	121	"Dhoorathil Unnai"	Tamil	Karthik Raja	
2012	Neethaane En Ponvasantham	122	"Saainthu Saainthu nee"	Tamil	Ilaiyaraaja	
2012	Neethaane En Ponvasantham	123	"Pengal endral poiya"	Tamil	Ilaiyaraaja	
2012	Yeto Vellipoyindhi Manasu	124	"Ardhamayyindinte Inthena"	Telugu	Ilaiyaraaja	
2013	Samar	125	"Poikkal Kuthirai"	Tamil	Yuvan Shankar Raja	
2013	Kedi Billa Killadi Ranga	126	"Oru Porambokku"	Tamil	Yuvan Shankar Raja	
2013	Kedi Billa Killadi Ranga	127	"Sudasuda Thooral"	Tamil	Yuvan Shankar Raja	
2013	Moondru Per Moondru Kadal	128	"Unakkaagave Uyir Vaazhgiren"	Tamil	Yuvan Shankar Raja	
2013	Thillu Mullu	129	"Thillu Mullu Remix"	Tamil	M. S. Viswanathan, Yuvan Shankar Raja	
2013	Aadhalal Kadhal Seiveer	130	"Mella Siritthal"	Tamil	Yuvan Shankar Raja	
2013	Aadhalal Kadhal Seiveer	131	"Aararo"	Tamil	Yuvan Shankar Raja	
2013	Vellachi	132	"Poiya Pochey Enkadhal"	Tamil	Bhavatharini	
2013	Maryan	133	"Kadal Raasa Naan"	Tamil	A. R. Rahman	
2013	Biriyani	134	"Nahna Na Nah"	Tamil	Yuvan Shankar Raja	
2013	Biriyani	135	"Edhirthu Nil"	Tamil	Yuvan Shankar Raja	
2013	Biriyani	136	"Nahna Na Nah (New Jack Swing Mix)"	Tamil	Yuvan Shankar Raja	
2013	Biriyani	137	"Nahna Na Nah (Extended Dance Mix)" (Mixed & Arranged by Premgi Amaren)	Tamil	Yuvan Shankar Raja	
2014	Anjaan	138	"Kaadhal Aasai"	Tamil	Yuvan Shankar Raja	
2014	Megha	139	"Mugilo Megamo"	Tamil	Ilaiyaraaja	
2014	Megha	140	"Chellam Konjum"	Tamil	Ilaiyaraaja	
2014	Vanavarayan Vallavarayan	141	"Tharaimelae Irunthae Naan"	Tamil	Yuvan Shankar Raja	
2014	Poojai	142	"Uyire Uyire"	Tamil	Yuvan Shankar Raja	
2014	Idam Porul Eval	143	"Atthuvaana Kaatukku"	Tamil	Yuvan Shankar Raja	
2015	Vai Raja Vai	144	"Pachchai Vanna"	Tamil	Yuvan Shankar Raja	
2015	Vai Raja Vai	145	"Pookkamazh"	Tamil	Yuvan Shankar Raja	
2015	Vai Raja Vai	146	"Naam Vaazhndhidum"	Tamil	Yuvan Shankar Raja	
2015	Massu Engira Masilamani	147	"Therikkudhu Masss"	Tamil	Yuvan Shankar Raja	
2015	Massu Engira Masilamani	148	"Poochandi"	Tamil	Yuvan Shankar Raja	
2015	Massu Engira Masilamani	149	"Therikkudhu Masss (Gasa Gasa Mix)" (Remixed by Premgi Amaren)	Tamil	Yuvan Shankar Raja	
2015	Trisha Illana Nayanthara	150	"Mutham Kodutha Maayakaari"	Tamil	G. V. Prakash Kumar	
2015	Yatchan	151	"Konjalaai"	Tamil	Yuvan Shankar Raja	
2015	Yatchan	152	"Kaaka Ponnu"	Tamil	Yuvan Shankar Raja	
2015	Yatchan	153	"Innum Enna"	Tamil	Yuvan Shankar Raja	
2016	Ennama Katha Vudranunga	154	"Uyirae Uyirae"	Tamil	Ravi Vijay Anand	
2016	Idhu Namma Aalu	155	"Kanne Un Kadhal"	Tamil	Kuralarasan	
2016	Chennai 600028 II	156	"Boys are Back"	Tamil	Yuvan Shankar Raja	
2016	Chennai 600028 II	157	"Sopana Sundari"	Tamil	Yuvan Shankar Raja	
2016	Nenjam Marappathillai	158	"En Pondatti"	Tamil	Yuvan Shankar Raja	
2016	Nenjam Marappathillai	159	"Kannungala en Chellangala"	Tamil	Yuvan Shankar Raja	
2016	Nenjam Marappathillai	160	"Malai varum Vennila"	Tamil	Yuvan Shankar Raja	
2017	Yaakkai	161	"Neee"	Tamil	Yuvan Shankar Raja	
2017	Yaakkai	162	"Naan Ini Kaatril"	Tamil	Yuvan Shankar Raja	
2017	Kadamban	163	"Otha Paarvayil"	Tamil	Yuvan Shankar Raja	
2017	Sathriyan	164	"Paarai Mele"	Tamil	Yuvan Shankar Raja	
2017	Anbanavan Asaradhavan Adangadhavan	165	"Thatha Love"	Tamil	Yuvan Shankar Raja	
2017	Taramani	166	"Pavangalai"	Tamil	Yuvan Shankar Raja	
2017	Taramani	167	"Yaaro Uchikilai"	Tamil	Yuvan Shankar Raja	
2017	Taramani	168	"Unnai unnai"	Tamil	Yuvan Shankar Raja	
2017	Gowdru Hotel	169	"Ondhe Jeevana"	Kannada	Yuvan Shankar Raja	
2017	Gowdru Hotel	170	"Kshanvu Kooda"	Kannada	Yuvan Shankar Raja	
2017	Balloon	171	"Mazhai Megam"	Tamil	Yuvan Shankar Raja	
2017	Sakka Podu Podu Raja	172	"Kadhal Dhevathai"	Tamil	Silambarasan	
2018	Padaiveeran	173	"Ithuvarai Naan (Male)"	Tamil	Karthik Raja	
2018	Peranbu	174	"Anbe Anbin"	Tamil	Yuvan Shankar Raja	
2018	Tik Tik Tik	175	"Tik Tik Tik Title Track"	Tamil	D. Imman	
2018	Semma Botha Aagathey	176	"Semma Botha Aagathey"	Tamil	Yuvan Shankar Raja	
2018	Semma Botha Aagathey	177	"Idhayathai Oru Nodi"	Tamil	Yuvan Shankar Raja	
2018	Peipasi	178	"Peipasi - Promo Song"	Tamil	Yuvan Shankar Raja	
2018	Pyaar Prema Kaadhal	179	"Dope track"	Tamil	Yuvan Shankar Raja	
2018	Pyaar Prema Kaadhal	180	"Surprise Me"	Tamil	Yuvan Shankar Raja	
2018	Pyaar Prema Kaadhal	181	"Miss You Papa"	Tamil	Yuvan Shankar Raja	
2018	Jarugandi	182	"Yaaradi Nee"	Tamil	Bobo Shashi	
2018	Vanjagar Ulagam	183	"Thee Yazhlini"	Tamil	Sam C. S.	
2018	Raja Ranguski	184	"Pattukutty Neethan"	Tamil	Yuvan Shankar Raja	
2018	Sandakozhi 2	185	"Kambathu Ponnu"	Tamil	Yuvan Shankar Raja	
2018	Maari 2	186	"Maari Gethu"	Tamil	Yuvan Shankar Raja	
2019	Kanne Kalaimaane	187	"Endhan Kangalai"	Tamil	Yuvan Shankar Raja	
2019	Kanne Kalaimaane	188	"Vaa Vellai Raasathi"	Tamil	Yuvan Shankar Raja	
2019	Kazhugu 2	189	"Adi Yendi Pulla"	Tamil	Yuvan Shankar Raja	
2019	Nerkonda Paarvai	190	"Agalaathey"	Tamil	Yuvan Shankar Raja	
2019	Pistha	191	"Azhagula Rasathi"	Tamil	Dharan Kumar	
2019	Puppy	192	"Anjimanikku"	Tamil	Dharan Kumar	
2019	Aruvam	193	"Veesiya Visiri"	Tamil	Thaman S	
2019	Hero	194	"Hero Title Track"	Tamil	Yuvan Shankar Raja	
2019	Hero	195	"Overa Feel Pannuren"	Tamil	Yuvan Shankar Raja	

==== 2020s ====
Year	Album	No	Song	Language	Composer(s)	Ref.
2020	Anbulla Ghilli	196	"Lovvu Lovvu"	Tamil	Arrol Corelli	
2021	Master	197	"Andha Kanna Paathaaka"	Tamil	Anirudh Ravichander	
2021	Kalathil Santhippom	198	"Unnai Paartha Naal"	Tamil	Yuvan Shankar Raja	
2021	Chakra	199	"Harla Farla"	Tamil	Yuvan Shankar Raja	
2021	Radhe Shyam	200	"Aagoozhile" (D)	Tamil	Justin Prabhakaran	
2021	Radhe Shyam	201	"Ee Raathale"	Tamil	Justin Prabhakaran	
2021	Maamanithan	202	"Ye Rasa"	Tamil	Yuvan Shankar Raja	
2021	Kasada Thabara	203	"Enakenna Aachu"	Tamil	Yuvan Shankar Raja	
2021	Dikkiloona	204	"Yedhum Solladhe"	Tamil	Yuvan Shankar Raja	
2021	Maanaadu	205	"Meherezylaa"	Tamil	Yuvan Shankar Raja	
2021	Plan Panni Pannanum	206	"Neengum Bothil"	Tamil	Yuvan Shankar Raja	
2022	Anbarivu	207	"Arakkiyae"	Tamil	Hiphop Tamizha	
2022	Veeramae Vaagai Soodum	208	"Thithikkirathe Kangal"	Tamil	Yuvan Shankar Raja	
2022	Veeramae Vaagai Soodum	209	"Matthikinche Kalley" (D)	Telugu	Yuvan Shankar Raja	
2022	Valimai	210	"Naanga Vera Maari"	Tamil	Yuvan Shankar Raja	
2022	Oh My Dog	211	"I'm A Fighter"	Tamil	Nivas K. Prasanna	
2022	Viruman	212	"Madura Veeran"	Tamil	Yuvan Shankar Raja	
2022	Viruman	213	"Aagasam Kannukkulla"	Tamil	Yuvan Shankar Raja	
2022	Captain	214	"Ninaivugal"	Tamil	D Imman	
2022	Naane Varuvean	215	"Veera Soora"	Tamil	Yuvan Shankar Raja	
2022	Naane Varuvean	216	"Rendu Raja"	Tamil	Yuvan Shankar Raja	
2022	Love Today	217	"Saachittale"	Tamil	Yuvan Shankar Raja	
2022	Love Today	218	"Ennai Vittu"	Tamil	Yuvan Shankar Raja	
2022	Love Today	219	"Pranam Pothunna" (D)	Telugu	Yuvan Shankar Raja	
2022	Coffee with Kadhal	220	"Baby Gurl"	Tamil	Yuvan Shankar Raja	
2022	Coffee with Kadhal	221	"Thiyagi Boys"	Tamil	Yuvan Shankar Raja	
2022	Coffee with Kadhal	222	"Naalaya Pozhudhu"	Tamil	Yuvan Shankar Raja	
2022	Agent Kannayiram	223	"Oppari Rap"	Tamil	Yuvan Shankar Raja	
2022	Laththi	224	"Thotta Load Aage Waiting"	Tamil	Yuvan Shankar Raja	
2022	Laththi	225	"Veerathukkor Niramundu"	Tamil	Yuvan Shankar Raja	
2023	Dada	226	"Pogathey"	Tamil	Jen Martin	
2023	Modern Love Chennai	227	"Peranbae"	Tamil	Yuvan Shankar Raja	
2023	Bommai	228	"Mudhal Muththam"	Tamil	Yuvan Shankar Raja	
2023	Bommai	229	"Enadhuyir Enge"	Tamil	Yuvan Shankar Raja	
2023	Adiyae	230	"Mudhal Kaadhal"	Tamil	Justin Prabhakaran	
2023	Paramporul	231	"Adiyaathi"	Tamil	Yuvan Shankar Raja	
2023	Paramporul	232	"Asaivindri"	Tamil	Yuvan Shankar Raja	
2023	Irugapatru	233	"Piriyathiru"	Tamil	Justin Prabhakaran	
2023	Iraivan	234	"Idhu Pola"	Tamil	Yuvan Shankar Raja	
2023	Iraivan	235	"Fear Beat"	Tamil	Yuvan Shankar Raja	
2023	Jigarthanda DoubleX	236	"Theekuchi"	Tamil	Santhosh Narayanan	
2023	Joe	237	"Ore Kanaa"	Tamil	Siddhu Kumar	
2023	Ninaivellam Neeyada	238	"Idhayame Idhayame"	Tamil	Ilaiyaraaja	
2023	Conjuring Kannappan	239	"Bakkunu Suthureney"	Tamil	Yuvan Shankar Raja	
2024	Nanban Oruvan Vantha Piragu	240	"Nee Yen"	Tamil	A.H. Kaashif	
2024	Pon Ondru Kanden	241	"Sun Light"	Tamil	Yuvan Shankar Raja	
2024	Pon Ondru Kanden	242	"Ennammaa"	Tamil	Yuvan Shankar Raja	
2024	Star	243	"College Superstars"	Tamil	Yuvan Shankar Raja	
2024	Star	244	"Star In The Making"	Tamil	Yuvan Shankar Raja	
2024	Star	245	"Vintage Love"	Tamil	Yuvan Shankar Raja	
2024	Star	246	"The First Rain"	Tamil	Yuvan Shankar Raja	
2024	Garudan	247	"Panjavarna Kiliye"	Tamil	Yuvan Shankar Raja	
2024	Gangs of Godavari	248	"Bad"	Telugu	Yuvan Shankar Raja	
2024	Gangs of Godavari	249	"Mattadakunda"	Telugu	Yuvan Shankar Raja	
2024	Kummattikali	250	"Kadal Pole"	Malayalam	Sumesh Parameswar	
2024	The Greatest of All Time	251	"Whistle Podu"	Tamil	Yuvan Shankar Raja	
2024	The Greatest of All Time	252	"Spark"	Tamil	Yuvan Shankar Raja	
2024	The Greatest of All Time	253	"Spark" (D)	Telugu	Yuvan Shankar Raja	
2024	The Greatest of All Time	254	"Sorgame Endralum Remix"	Tamil	Yuvan Shankar Raja	
2025	Nesippaya	255	"Tholanja Manasu"	Tamil	Yuvan Shankar Raja	
2025	Nesippaya	256	"Sol Nee Sol"	Tamil	Yuvan Shankar Raja	
2025	Aghathiyaa	257	"Kaatrin Viral"	Tamil	Yuvan Shankar Raja	
2025	Dragon	258	"Iraivaa"	Tamil	Leon James	
2025	Varunan	259	"Mudiyaadhey"	Tamil	Bobo Shashi	
2025	Sweetheart!	260	"Kadhavai Thirandhaye"	Tamil	Yuvan Shankar Raja	
2025	Sweetheart!	261	"Kadhal Poidhana"	Tamil	Yuvan Shankar Raja	
2025	Nenjam Marappathillai (OST)	262	"Devil's Duet"	Tamil	Yuvan Shankar Raja	
2025	Nenjam Marappathillai (OST)	263	"Bring it On!"	Tamil	Yuvan Shankar Raja	
2025	Tourist Family	264	"Ore Vaanam"	Tamil	Sean Roldan	
2025	Dark	265	"Irulenbathu"	Tamil	Manu Ramesan	
2025	Shashtipoorthi	266	"Rathrantha Rache"	Telugu	Ilaiyaraaja	
2025	Paranthu Po	267	"Kashtam Vandhaa"	Tamil	Santhosh Dhayanidhi	
2025	Maareesan	268	''Maareesa''	Tamil	Yuvan Shankar Raja	
2025	Gandhi Kannadi	269	"Kadhal Uyire"	Tamil	Vivek–Mervin	
2025	Kombuseevi	270	"Unna Naan Paatha"	Tamil	Yuvan Shankar Raja	
2025	Kombuseevi	271	"Amma En Thangakani"	Tamil	Yuvan Shankar Raja	
2025	Sirai	272	"Minnu Vattaam Poochi"	Tamil	Justin Prabhakaran	
2026	Parasakthi	273	"Senai Koottam"	Tamil	G. V. Prakash Kumar	
2026	Parasakthi	274	"Koodey Sainyam" (D)	Telugu	G. V. Prakash Kumar	
2026	With Love	275	"Edhukku Dhan Indha Kaadhal"	Tamil	Sean Roldan	
2026	TN 2026	276	"Hey Alangaari"	Tamil	Darbuka Siva	
2026	Yezhu Kadal Yezhu Malai	277	"Namakkaai Oru Vaanam"	Tamil	Yuvan Shankar Raja	
2026	Sigma	278	"Ayyayo Ammaadi"	Tamil	Thaman S	
2026	Sigma	279	"Olammo Vagalaadi"	Telugu	Thaman S	
2026	Raja's Playlist	280	"Konji Konji"	Tamil	Yuvan Shankar Raja	
2026	Raja's Playlist	281	"Konji Konji ~ Flare Mix"	Tamil	Yuvan Shankar Raja	
2026	Paraipadi	282	"Paatt Paripadi"	Malayalam	Yuvan Shankar Raja	
2026	Paraipadi	283	"Paatt Paripadi" (D)	Tamil	Yuvan Shankar Raja	

==== Notes ====
- (D) indicates dubbing.

=== Non-film songs ===
Year	Song	No	Album	Language	Composer(s)	Ref.
1999	"Oli Veesum"	1	The Blast	Tamil	Yuvan Shankar Raja	
1999	"Nee Thane"	2	The Blast	Tamil	Yuvan Shankar Raja	
1999	"Chippikule Muthu Pookkal"	3	The Blast	Tamil	Yuvan Shankar Raja	
1999	"Oru Naal"	4	The Blast	Tamil	Yuvan Shankar Raja	
1999	"Poradu Poradu Poovodu"	5	The Blast	Tamil	Yuvan Shankar Raja	
1999	"Vaa Nanbane"	6	The Blast	Tamil	Yuvan Shankar Raja	
1999	"Sonnare"	7	The Blast	Tamil	Yuvan Shankar Raja	
1999	"Unn Ninaivai"	8	The Blast	Tamil	Yuvan Shankar Raja	
1999	"Aval Devathai"	9	The Blast	Tamil	Yuvan Shankar Raja	
2010	"Semmozhiyaana Thamizh Mozhiyaam"	10	Single	Tamil	A. R. Rahman	
2011	"I'll Be There For You"	11	Single	Tamil	Yuvan Shankar Raja	
2012	"Vandhanam"	12	Srivilliputtur Andal	Tamil	Karthik Raja	
2019	"Rasaathi Nenja"	13	Single	Tamil	Dharan Kumar	
2020	"Arivum Anbum"	14	Single	Tamil	Ghibran	
2020	"Yaa Nabi"	15	Single	Tamil	Rizwan	
2021	"Top Tucker"	16	Single	Tamil, Hindi	Yuvan Shankar Raja	
2021	"Tala Al Badru Alayna"	17	Single	Tamil, Arabic	Yuvan Shankar Raja	
2021	"Dont Touch Me"	18	Single	Tamil	Yuvan Shankar Raja	
2021	"Vendru Va Veerargale"	19	Single	Tamil	Yuvan Shankar Raja	
2022	"Iruthalai Kolli"	20	Single	Tamil	Yuvan Shankar Raja	
2022	"Unna Paathale"	21	Single	Tamil	Yuvan Shankar Raja	
2023	"Yaar Intha Peigal"	22	Single	Tamil	Ilaiyaraaja	
2024	"Money in the Bank"	23	Single	Tamil	Yuvan Shankar Raja	
2024	"She's a killer"	24	Single	Tamil	Yuvan Shankar Raja	
2024	"Chennai Formula 4 Racing 2024 Theme"	25	Single	Tamil	Yuvan Shankar Raja	

== As lyricist ==
List of Yuvan Shankar Raja film credits as lyricist
Year	Title	Song	Co-lyricist	Ref.
2007	Chennai 600028	"Natpukkullae"		
2008	Saroja	"Cheeky Cheeky"	Vaali	
2008	Saroja	"My Life"		
2010	Theeradha Vilaiyattu Pillai	"Introduction"		
2010	Vaanam	"Evan Di Unna Pethan"	Silambarasan	
2011	Mankatha	"Vilaiyaadu Mankatha"	Gangai Amaran	
2011	Mankatha	"Vilaiyaadu Mankatha (Extended Dance Mix)"	Gangai Amaran	
2013	Biriyani	"Nahna Na Nah"	Vaali	
2018	Maari 2	"Maari Gethu"		
2024	Non-album single	"She's a killer"		

== Studio albums ==
List of albums
Year	Title	Notes	Ref.
1999	The Blast	Yuvan’s debut Indipop studio album	

== Singles ==
=== As lead artist ===
List of singles as lead artist
Year	Title	Collaboration	Notes	Ref.
2021	"Top Tucker"	with Uchana Amit, Badshah, and Jonita Gandhi		
2021	"Tala Al Badru Alayna"	feat. A. R. Ameen		
2021	"Dont Touch Me"	feat. Arivu and Yunohoo		
2022	"Candy"	feat. Dhvani Bhanushali		
2022	"Iruthalai Kolli"		Single from Naatpadu Theral S02	
2022	"Unna Paathale"		1min song	
2024	"Money in the Bank"	feat. Bank Rolls Young, S Ghost		
2024	"She's a killer"			

=== As featured artist ===
List of singles as featured artist
Year	Title	Composer	Notes	Ref.
2010	"Semmozhiyaana Thamizh Mozhiyaam"	A. R. Rahman		
2012	"Vandhanam"	Karthik Raja	From Srivilliputtur Andal album	
2019	"Rasaathi Nenja"	Dharan Kumar		
2020	"Arivum Anbum"	Ghibran		
2020	"Yaa Nabi"	Rizwan		
2023	"Yaar Intha Peigal"	Ilaiyaraaja		

=== Promotional singles ===
Year	Title	Notes	Ref.
2011	"I'll Be There For You"	Promotional single for the Yuvan – Live in Concert	
2021	"Vendru Vaa"	A song to cheer Tamil Nadu players who took part in the Tokyo Olympics 2020	
2022	"Think of Me"	Promotional song for Yuvan 25 live concert in Kuala Lumpur	
2023	"High on Yuvan"	Promotional single for the Yuvan live concert in Europe	
2024	"Chennai Formula 4 Racing 2024 Theme"	Promotional single for Chennai Formula Racing Circuit	

== Non-film works ==
=== Television ===
- Ananda Bhavan (Title song only)
- Senior Junior (Title song only)

=== Theatre ===
- 2014 – Chicago
