= Raja Natwarlal (soundtrack) =

Soundtrack album by Yuvan Shankar Raja
- Released: 30 July 2014
- Recorded: September 2013–June 2014
- Studios: Kalasa Studios, Chennai; YRF Studios, Mumbai
- Genre: Feature film soundtrack
- Length: 24:35
- Language: Hindi
- Label: Junglee Music
- Producer: Yuvan Shankar Raja

Yuvan Shankar Raja chronology
Anjaan (2013)	Raja Natwarlal (2014)	Govindudu Andarivadele (2014)
External audio
- Audio Jukebox on YouTube

Raja Natwarlal is the soundtrack album to the 2014 film of the same name directed by Kunal Deshmukh and starring Emraan Hashmi, Humaima Malik, Paresh Rawal, Kay Kay Menon and Deepak Tijori. The six-song soundtrack featured music composed by Yuvan Shankar Raja in his Hindi film debut, and lyrics written by Irshad Kamil. The soundtrack was released through Junglee Music on 30 July 2014 to mostly positive reviews from critics.

== Development ==
"When I was approached for Raja Natwarlal, I took it up with some trepidation. Music plays a pivotal role in all Emraan Hashmi films. So the pressure to deliver something fresh to an audience that’s totally new to me was high. I’m happy the response has been good."

— Yuvan Shankar Raja on composing music for Raja Natwarlal

In May 2013, Pritam was initially assigned to compose the soundtrack for Raja Natwarlal, having previously worked with Deshmukh on Jannat (2008), Tum Mile (2009) and Jannat 2 (2012). However, Pritam wanted to take a break from films; he referred to the noted Tamil film composer Yuvan Shankar Raja by sending some of his songs, albeit not having met before.

Raja Natwarlal eventually became Yuvan's debut in the Hindi film music scene. Yuvan had received numerous offers from Bollywood but could not sign them because of his commitments in South Indian films; when Deshmukh arrived to Chennai at his studio to narrate the script, he was intrigued by the idea of the film's storyline and with Hashmi being known for his musical hits, approved his nod for the film. Upon signing, Yuvan insisted Deshmukh that he would compose all the songs for the film, which the latter also agreed.

Deshmukh personally attributed to Yuvan's involvement where he would do justice to "the street – side, mass zone" kind of music, which he did successfully in his Tamil films. Yuvan had composed six songs, which includes four romantic numbers including one reprise, one dance number and in Hashmi's words, "a dhinchak tapori" song. On working in Hindi film music in comparison to South films, Yuvan admitted that "there are songs where I don’t understand the lyrics but I am able to connect to the tune. I have friends in Mumbai who don’t know Tamil, but listen to my songs and they tell me they love them."

The song "Tere Hoke" was first recorded with a reprised version rendered by Shweta Pandit. As Deshmukh heard the tune, he was convinced on it being a quintessential romantic number centered on Hashmi. He convinced Yuvan to record the male version with Arijit Singh's vocals. Yuvan liked Arijit's voice, which led him to program the male version and left to Mumbai for recording that version, which was done within 45 minutes. Though Arijit was feeling unwell and requested to push the recording another day, Yuvan persuaded him to sing a few lines and insisted that his scratch vocals worked for the song, after which Arijit had recorded the full version. Arijit described the song as "a catchy commercial track with Yuvan's Southern touch and the richness of melody."

== Release ==
The soundtrack to Raja Natwarlal was distributed under the Junglee Music label and was launched on 30 July 2014 at Radio City. Hashmi, Malik and Deshmukh were present at the event; all the songs were aired through FM radio stations and was directly launched through music streaming platforms and retail stores, the same day as the launch.

== Reception ==
Joginder Tuteja from Rediff.com gave the album 3 out of 5 stars and wrote, "Raja Natwarlal's music grows on you slowly" further adding, "Since debutant Yuvan Shankar Raja brings in a new sound with this album, he deserves a few hearings before one pronounces judgment". In a 4-star review, Kasmin Fernandes of The Times of India described it as "thoroughly entertaining" and concluded "Yuvan Shankar Raja makes a confident debut but has a long way to go." Karthik Srinivasan of Milliblog wrote "For a 100+ soundtracks old Yuvan, this is an oddly mild Hindi debut".

Rajiv Vijayakar of Bollywood Hungama gave 2.5 stars out of 5 and wrote, "Yuvan Shankar Raja has absorbed the ethos of the contemporary Hindi film song with far more accuracy, acumen and sharpness than any colleague down South with the exception of that redoubtable genius, M.M. Kreem. Yuvan Shankar Raja's tunes are quite trendy, and their appeal makes the score sound fresh despite generic similarities to today's 'hit' music. His production is immaculate and Irshad Kamil's lyrics, as usual, vary from the pithy to the occasionally needlessly Sufi".

== Track listing ==
Raja Natwarlal (Original Motion Picture Soundtrack)
No.	Title	Artist(s)	Length
1.	"Tere Hoke Rehengay"	Arijit Singh	4:03
2.	"Dukki Tikki"	Mika Singh	4:59
3.	"Tere Hoke Rehengay (Reprise)"	Shweta Pandit	4:29
4.	"Kabhi Ruhani Kabhi Rumani"	Benny Dayal	4:00
5.	"Namak Paare"	Mamta Sharma, Anupam Amod	3:45
6.	"Flip Your Collar Back"	Benny Dayal	3:59
Total length:			24:35
