= J. Suresh =

Indian film director

- Born: Tamil Nadu, India
- Occupation: Film director
- Years active: 1998–present

J. Suresh is an Indian film director, who has directed Tamil films.

== Career ==
Suresh made his debut with Velai (1998), a drama film with music composed by Yuvan Shankar Raja in his second venture. Suresh then approached Mani Ratnam to produce his next film Ennavalle, but although he refused, Mani Ratnam introduced Suresh to Madhavan. The film was initially titled as Sugham, and marked the debut of actress Sneha after her first film, Virumbugiren, got delayed. The film however opened to negative reviews and did not perform well at the box office. His next film, the romantic comedy Junior Senior featuring Mammootty and Hamsavardhan, also gained poor reviews with a critic noting "absurd and haphazardly shot Junior Senior is one of the most insufferable movies in recent times".

Suresh launched a film titled Surangani in 2008, featuring music by Yuvan Shankar Raja, in which he would star in the lead role. however despite regular schedules, the film was uncompleted and never released. In 2012, he directed and starred in the lead role in Paraseega Mannan, a commercial action film set on the backdrop of child trafficking. The film was also set to release in Malayalam as Arabian Rajakumaran and featured music by Suresh himself, while Yuvan Shankar Raja helped him out during song discussions.

== Personal life ==
Suresh married film actress Meera during May 2001 at a temple in T Nagar, Chennai. Meera had worked on films such as Pondatti Sonna Kettukanum (1991) and Arunachalam (1997) and many Tamil and other language movies.

== Filmography ==
Year	Film	Notes
1998	Velai	
2000	Ennavalle	
2002	Junior Senior	
2012	Paraseega Mannan	Also actor and music composer
2025	Mr Zoo Keeper	
