= Govindudu Andarivadele (soundtrack) =

Soundtrack album by Yuvan Shankar Raja
- Released: 1 September 2014
- Recorded: 2014
- Genre: Feature film soundtrack
- Length: 24:52
- Language: Telugu
- Label: Aditya Music
- Producer: Yuvan Shankar Raja

Yuvan Shankar Raja chronology
Raja Natwarlal (2014)	Govindudu Andarivadele (2014)	Poojai (2014)

Govindudu Andarivadele is the feature film soundtrack composed by Yuvan Shankar Raja for the 2014 Telugu-language action film of the same name directed by Krishna Vamsi. The soundtrack consists of 6 songs whose lyrics were written by Suddala Ashok Teja, Sri Mani, Sirivennela Sitaramasastri, Ramajogayya Sastry, Chandrabose and Lakshmi Bhoopal each. It was released by Aditya Music label on 1 September 2014 in a promotional event held at Shilpakala Vedika in Hyderabad.

== Production ==
Krishna Vamsi wanted to narrate the story of a London bred NRI who visits India in search of his roots. After finishing the scriptwork, he had 16 situations for placement of songs which he later reduced to six, which included one dance number because of Ram Charan's popularity as a dancer, two family songs apart from three romantic songs. S. Thaman, who composed the music for Ram Charan's Naayak (2013) was signed as the music director of the film marking his first collaboration with Krishna Vamsi. However, in mid-April 2014, he was replaced by Yuvan Shankar Raja due to conflicting schedules, although sources reported that talks were also held with G. V. Prakash Kumar. In late April, during the music sittings with Yuvan Shankar Raja at Chennai, Krishna Vamsi confirmed the news in a telephonic conversation with Suresh Krishnamoorthy of The Hindu stating, "Initially, music for the film was to be composed by Thaman, but he told me that he was busy and agreed to a change. It was an amicable decision. I must also add that I am looking for music that will be in sync with the mood, in every scene, notes that will showcase culture and tradition, sound modern yet ancient, one of a kind, conceptual sound from the land and from the people".

It became the first time that Krishna Vamsi collaborated with Yuvan Shankar Raja, with the director later informing that he had waited five years to work with the composer; it was also the first time Yuvan scored for a film starring Srikanth and Ram Charan. In the end of April 2014, it was reported that the song Adavari Matalaku from Pawan Kalyan's Kushi would be remixed for this film which itself was a remixed version of the same song penned by Pingali Nagendrarao for the 1955 film Missamma. However, there was no official confirmation. Yuvan and Krishna Vamsi patiently worked for more than 15 days on a single tune for a song in order to get it perfect which according to the latter "forms the nucleus" of the film. That song's lyrics were penned by Suddala Ashok Teja. The song was titled Neeli Rangu Cheeralona which was sung by the character of Balaraju played by Prakash Raj in the film. Krishna Vamsi wanted to include this song as the character of Balaraju believes in living happily using which the song was supposed to explain his take on life with woman as the example and the slang in rural areas where Telugu is spoken mostly sounds like songs. After being narrated the whole script and the situation of the song, Suddala Ashok Teja participated in discussions during the recording at Chennai and Hyderabad and 12 versions written by him were rejected before finalizing this one for which Ashok Teja took 28 days. On the night of the film's teaser launch in Hyderabad, Krishna Vamsi said this song would be remembered for decades.

In the press note released on 28 May 2014 it was stated that during the schedule break in May, Yuvan Shankar Raja finished composing 3 songs for the film including the title track of the film. By the end of June 2014, Yuvan completed composing of 4 songs in the soundtrack album. Chandrabose penned lyrics for the song Bavagari Choope which was the other family song apart from Neeli Rangu Cheeralona. He was instructed by Krishna Vamsi to use 2 charanams, the first one to describe the romance between both the lead pairs while the second charanam explaining the film's basic storyline briefly. Ramajogayya Sastry was approached by Krishna Vamsi to write the lyrics for the introduction song of Ram Charan in the film, which was a dance number. This was his first collaboration with Krishna Vamsi and his name was suggested by Ram Charan. He was given a time of four days to finish penning the song's lyrics after being narrated the film's story. The song was shot in and around the locales of London. The lyrics of one of the two romantic songs Gulabi Kallu Rendu Mullu shot on Charan and Kajal predominantly were penned by Sri Mani marking his first collaboration with Krishna Vamsi. He chose to start the song with the words Gulabi Kallu Rendu Mullu... (Rose Eyes turn two thorns) because after listening to the story, he felt that in romance, a girl's eyes would hit a boy's hearts like thorns besides the eyes of the female lead played by Kajal being very attractive.

The other romantic song Ra Rakumara was sung by Chinmayi and its lyrics were penned by Sirivennela Sitaramasastri. For this song, Yuvan used Dharmavathi Raaga which is popularly known as Madhuvanti Raaga in Hindustani music. It was a rare raaga used in Telugu with Vennello Godari Andam from Sitaara (1983), Andela Ravamidi Padamulada from Swarnakamalam (1988) being two notable examples composed using this raaga. The last song in the soundtrack Kokkokkodi was penned by Lakshmi Bhoopal. The song's situation was a duet song where the male leads are drunk and they would imagine their love interests nearby thus expressing each other's feelings. Krishna Vamsi gave reference of four to five songs composed by Ilaiyaraaja to compose this tune. Bhoopal had to use few words and lines which were experimental and imaginary in nature. Initially, the song was not included in the final version screened in theaters. As a marketing strategy, the makers later planned to add this song to the film being screened in theaters to boost the collections. Yuvan started re-recording for the film's first half on 6 August 2014 at his studio in Chennai.

== Track listing ==
=== Original (Telugu) ===
Govindudu Andarivadele (Original Motion Picture Soundtrack)
No.	Title	Lyrics	Artist(s)	Length
1.	"Neeli Rangu Cheeralona"	Suddala Ashok Teja	Hariharan	04:46
2.	"Gulabi Kallu Rendu Mullu"	Sri Mani	Javed Ali	04:24
3.	"Ra Rakumara"	Sirivennela Sitaramasastri	Chinmayi	03:42
4.	"Prathi Chota Nake Swagatham"	Ramajogayya Sastry	Ranjith	03:32
5.	"Chinnariki"	Chandrabose	Hemachandra, Sravana Bhargavi, Krishna Chaitanya, Ramya Behara	04:08
6.	"Kokkokkodi"	Lakshmi Bhoopal	Karthik, Haricharan, M. M. Manasi, Rita	04:19

=== Tamil ===
Ram leela (Original Motion Picture Soundtrack)
No.	Title	Length
1.	"Senthamara Poothirich"	4:58
2.	"Vaa Vaa Vaa Kumara"	3:41
3.	"Neela Vanna Selai Mella"	5:18

=== Malayalam ===
Ekalavya (Original Motion Picture Soundtrack)
No.	Title	Length
1.	"Chenthaamara"	4:07
2.	"Va Va Kumara"	3:40
3.	"Snehamallam Jeevitham"	4:46

== Release ==
It was stated on 28 May 2014 that the film's audio would be launched in September 2014. In mid-July 2014, the soundtrack was reported to be released on 20 August 2014. However, there were rumors that the audio may release in the first week of September 2014. The same was confirmed in mid August 2014. It was later postponed to the last week of August 2014. On 10 August 2014 the makers declared the release date as 1 September 2014. The same was officially confirmed again by the makers in a press release on 25 August 2014. However, the complete soundtrack of the film was leaked online on the morning of 31 August 2014. The official track list was unveiled on the evening of 1 September 2014.

=== Marketing ===
Aditya Music acquired the soundtrack rights for a record price. Chiranjeevi was reported to attend the audio launch as the chief guest. A grand audio launch event was planned at Hyderabad on 1 September 2014 after the completion of the film's shooting schedule at London. Shilpakala Vedika was confirmed as the venue. It was confirmed later that the event's live telecast would begin at 7:30 PM IST and would be aired in MAA Movies. Along with the film's principal cast and crew, Charan's parents and wife Upasana, Nagababu, Dil Raju, Varun Tej, Niharika Konidela, K. S. Rama Rao, Shyam Prasad Reddy, Chinni Krishna, Allu Aravind, Sai Dharam Tej etc. attended the event. Chiranjeevi launched the audio CD and K. Raghavendra Rao received the first copy.

=== Reception ===
The album received with positive reviews from critics. A. S. Sashidhar, writing for The Times of India, gave a rating of 3 out of 5 and wrote, "[...] the album is filled with an interesting mix of songs, which will complement the story and Yuvan doesn't disappoint." IndiaGlitz stated "The film has got eclectic situations for distinct songs. And the album doesn't belie our expectations. From jamboree songs to romantic numbers to profound ones, this album lives up to the image that Krishna Vamsi's albums have carved out for themselves. Yuvan belches out two refreshing numbers by changing his style a bit" and rated the album 3 out of 5. Milliblog wrote that the soundtrack had "Good stuff by Yuvan, overall, on his Telugu comeback". Avad M. of 123telugu gave a review stating "On the whole with Govindudu Andarivadele, Yuvan Shankar Raja breaks away from the commercial format and gives quite a feel good music album. Gulabi Kallu, Baava Gari Choope and Pratichota Nake Swagatam are our picks and will be liked by everyone. Finally, GAV’s music will surely grow on you once you watch Krishna Vamsi’s beautiful visuals on screen." way2movies.com stated "Govindudu Andari Vadele is a feel Good melody from Yuvan Shankar Raja". It rated the songs "Neeli Rangu Cheeralona", "Gulabi Kallu Rendu Mullu" and "Bavagari Choope" 3.5 out of 5 each; it rated "Prathi Chota Nake Swagatham" 3.25 out of 5 and rated "Ra Rakumara" and "Kokkokkodi" 3 out of 5 each.
