= The Blast (album) =

Studio album by Yuvan Shankar Raja
- Released: 23 July 1999
- Recorded: 1996–1998
- Genre: Pop, hip hop, fusion, classical carnatic
- Length: 47:46
- Label: Pyramid Audio
- Producer: Yuvan Shankar Raja

Yuvan Shankar Raja (Indipop) chronology
The Blast (1999)	Song of Youth (2011)

The Blast is the first Indipop studio album by Indian musician Yuvan Shankar Raja, released in July 1999. It features 12 tracks, which were all composed by Yuvan Shankar Raja.

== Production ==
Yuvan Shankar Raja started working on an independent studio album, even before stepping into the Tamil film industry, working as a film composer and music director. It was, in fact, this album, which made possible his entry into film business, since producer T. Siva approached and eventually assigned him to compose the score for his 1997 Tamil film Aravindhan, after having listened to a couple of tracks, Yuvan Shankar had composed from this album.

He worked for nearly 2 years on this album, which finally got released in July 1999. But since he wasn't popular and not a household name yet during the time, his album went totally unnoticed and failed to gain attraction, though featuring some very popular artists as actor Kamal Haasan, Carnatic-based singers Nithyashree Mahadevan, Unnikrishnan and Srinivas.

According to Yuvan Shankar Raja, the album is based on the thought of World Peace. He tells, that during the time, he was working on this album, India was carrying out Nuclear testing, which he had used as the inspiration, from which also the title is derived.

== Track listing ==
1. "Oli Veesum" — 6:09
2. "Nee Thane" — 5:56
3. "Chippikule Muthu Pookkal" — 5:43
4. "Poovea Puthirae" — 3:50
5. "Oru Naal" — 3:05
6. "Mama Mama" — 6:52
7. "Poradu Poradu Poovodu" — 5:45
8. "Vaa Nanbane" — 3:38
9. "Mama Mama" (Instrumental) — 6:51
10. "Sonnare" — 5:56
11. "Unn Ninaivai" — 4:21
12. "Aval Devathai" — 2:24

== Release history ==
Region	Date	Label	Format	Catalog
Malaysia / India	July 23, 1999	Pyramid Audio	CD	8839
North America	July 28, 1999	Pyramid Audio	CD	

== Personnel ==
Following people are credited:

- Vocals:
  - Yuvan Shankar Raja (tracks 1, 2, 3, 5, 7, 8, 10, 11, 12)
  - Kamal Haasan (tracks 3, 8, 12)
  - Rajalakshmi (track 3)
  - Srinivas (track 4)
  - Unnikrishnan (track 5)
  - Nithyasree Mahadevan (track 5)
  - Nagoor Hanifa (track 6)
- Lyrics:
  - Sujatha
  - Vasan
  - Parthi Bhaskar
  - Kavi Ravi
