= Raam (2006 film) =

Indian comedy drama

- DVD cover
- Directed by: N. Shankar
- Written by: N. Shankar
- Produced by: N. Sudhakar Reddy
- Starring: Nithiin; Genelia D'Souza; Hrishitaa Bhatt; Atul Kulkarni; Krishnam Raju
- Cinematography: Jaya Krishna Gummadi
- Edited by: Gautham Raju
- Music by: Songs: Yuvan Shankar Raja; Score: Mani Sharma
- Production company: Sri Venkataramana Pictures
- Release date: 30 March 2006
- Country: India
- Language: Telugu

Raam is a 2006 Indian Telugu-language action comedy film written and directed by N.Shankar starring Nithiin, Genelia D'Souza and Hrishitaa Bhatt in lead roles and Krishnam Raju in a vital role. The film, produced by Nitin's father Sudhakar Reddy, has music scored by Yuvan Shankar Raja and was released on 30 March 2006. The film was later dubbed and released in Hindi as Jeene Do: Let Us Live in 2008 by Sumeet Arts.

== Plot ==
Raam, is a happy-go-lucky guy in Hyderabad. He is an upcoming cycle champion. A win in a competition takes him to the final round in Mumbai. However, life in Mumbai life pans out unexpectedly for him. He ends up unraveling the gritty knots of his family, especially that of his grandfather Dasharatha Ramaiah.

== Cast ==
- Nithiin as Raam
- Genelia D'Souza as Janaki / Lakshmi
- Krishnam Raju as Dasharatha Ramaiah
- Atul Kulkarni as Veerendra, Janaki's father
- Devaraj as Rahim
- Hrishitaa Bhatt as Jyotika
- Prasad Babu as Raam's father
- Rajya Lakshmi as Raam's mother
- Sana as Janaki's mother
- Brahmanandam as Dr. Chakravarti
- Ali
- Kovai Sarala
- MS Narayana
- Telangana Shakuntala
- Venu Madhav as Janaki's brother
- Jeeva
- AVS
- Dharmavarapu Subramanyam
- Vizag Prasad
- Shravan

== Production ==
The film's muhurat was held at Rama Naidu Studios on 19 August 2005. The title was confirmed by the end of 2005.

== Soundtrack ==
The soundtrack was composed by Yuvan Shankar Raja. It was released at Taj Banjara, Hyderabad on 10 March 2006 and features 5 tracks overall. Venkatesh and V. V. Vinayak attended the audio release function, which was anchored by Sattanna. The lyrics were written by Chinni Charan, Chandrabose and Bhuvanachandra. The beginning of "Nuvvena" was reused for "Megham Megham" in Kannamoochi Yenada (2007).

Raam

Soundtrack album by Yuvan Shankar Raja
- Released: 10 March 2006
- Recorded: 2005
- Genre: Soundtrack
- Length: 21:32
- Label: Aditya Music
- Producer: Yuvan Shankar Raja

Yuvan Shankar Raja chronology
Pattiyal (2006)	Raam (2006)	Azhagai Irukkirai Bayamai Irukkirathu (2006)

Track list
No.	Title	Lyrics	Singer(s)	Length
1.	"Evmaindo Emito (Shock)"	Chinni Charan	Shaan, Aanchal Datta Bhatia, Suchitra, Premji Amaran	4:39
2.	"Nuvvena"	Chandrabose	Haricharan, Shweta Mohan	4:23
3.	"Made in Hyderabad"	Chandrabose	Shankar Mahadevan	4:18
4.	"Kurabhani"	Bhuvana Chandra	Yuvan Shankar Raja, Sadhana Sargam	4:18
5.	"Pilla Bale"	Bhuvana Chandra	Tippu, Saindhavi	3:54
Total length:				21:32
