= Ennavalle =

2001 film by J. Suresh

- Theatrical poster
- Directed by: J. Suresh
- Written by: J. Suresh
- Produced by: S. Naga Ashok Kumar; N. V. Prasad
- Starring: R. Madhavan; Sneha
- Cinematography: Ashok Rajan
- Edited by: V. Jaishankar
- Music by: S. A. Rajkumar
- Production company: Sri Saideva Productions
- Release date: 21 December 2000
- Country: India
- Language: Tamil

Ennavalle (transl. Dear Girl) is a 2000 Indian Tamil-language romance film directed by J. Suresh which stars R. Madhavan in the lead role. Sneha made her Tamil debut through this film. The film also featured Manivannan, Thalaivasal Vijay, and Charle in pivotal roles, while music was composed by S. A. Rajkumar. The film was released on 21 December 2000 and failed at the box office. Its title is derived from a song from Kaadhalan (1994).

== Plot ==
James Vasanthan and his three friends Ganeshan, Charles, and Mohan, have a music troupe that sings at weddings. They are tenants of Subramani whose daughter Lakshmi shares a good rapport with the youths, helping them in their time of need. Her encouragement puts a new zeal in James, who soon gains recognition as a singer. However, this does not bring any change in the group's lifestyle, for J. Suresh still shows them as strugglers. James finally proposes to Lakshmi who rejects him, as she has her past to reckon with. She is a divorcee, her husband having abandoned her soon after marriage for his girlfriend. When Lakshmi's friend and neighbor Seetha puts some sense into her, she decides to make amends. But misunderstandings pile up between the lovers – the situations are all forced here – until J. Suresh leads the story to a desired happy ending.

== Cast ==
- R. Madhavan as James Vasanthan
- Sneha as Lakshmi
- Manivannan as Subramani
- Charle as Ganeshan
- Vaiyapuri as Charles
- Venu Madhav as Mohan
- Anand as Anand
- Thalaivasal Vijay as Neighbour
- Venu Arvind as Kumar
- Kalairani as Lakshmi's mother
- S. N. Lakshmi as Lakshmi's grandmother
- Aswini as Seetha
- Pandu as First House Owner
- K. R. Vatsala
- Kathadi Ramamurthy
- Oru Viral Krishna Rao
- Crane Manohar
- Scissor Manohar
- LIC Narasimhan
- A. V. Ramanan
- Pasi Sathya
- Jothi

== Production ==
The director J. Suresh initially approached Mani Ratnam to produce the film, but Ratnam refused the script. He however introduced Suresh to R. Madhavan, who was signed on to play the lead role. The film was eventually produced by Sri Sai Deva Productions, a noted Telugu film studio, making their first Tamil film venture. Tips Industries also entered the Tamil film industry as the soundtrack producers for the film.

The film was tentatively titled Sugham, whilst actress Sneha made her debut with the film after calling off schedules for her film, Virumbugiren. Telugu comedian Venu Madhav also made his debut in Tamil films with the project. The film was shot across locations in Kerala, Chennai, Ooty, Hyderabad and Gopichettipalayam and the filming was completed within 18 days.

== Soundtrack ==
The soundtrack was composed by S. A. Rajkumar, with lyrics by Vairamuthu and was released under the Tips label in their Tamil debut. Venky of Chennai Online wrote, "Madhavan's first movie in Tamil Alai Payuthey and third, Minnale have good songs but unfortunately his second, 'Ennavale', was a big letdown".

Song title	Singers
"Adi Kadhal Enbathu"	Hariharan
"Chinna Chinna Sugangal"	S. P. Balasubrahmanyam, Krishnaraj
"Kothu Kottai"	Sukhwinder Singh
"Ovvoru Padalilum"	P. Unnikrishnan
"Ra Ra Rajakumara"	Rajesh Krishnan, Sujatha Mohan
"Ovvoru Padalilum" (sad)	P. Unnikrishnan

== Release and reception ==
Ennavalle was released on 21 December 2000. Malini Mannath of Chennai Online wrote, "A routine storyline with the first half reminding one of films like 'Puthu Vasantham' and the twists and turns already twisted many a time in quite a few recent films, 'Ennavale' gives a sense of déjà vu throughout. There is nothing by way of novelty in script or presentation." Malathi Rangarajan of The Hindu critic revealed that the "reeks of melodrama bogs down even a natural performer like Madhavan". Visual Dasan of Kalki wrote if you are looking for solace other than the fact that you can watch it without cringing even if you go with your family, you can only say Madhavan and Sneha's performance. The film subsequently did not perform well at the box office.
