= Gowdru Hotel =

2017 Kannada film

- Directed by: Pon Kumaran
- Written by: Pon Kumaran
- Produced by: Satish Reddy A.
- Starring: Rachan Chandra; Vedhika; Prakash Raj
- Cinematography: Shiva
- Edited by: Ravi Santheiklu
- Music by: Yuvan Shankar Raja
- Production company: Eminent Movie Makers
- Release date: 1 December 2017
- Running time: 133 minutes
- Country: India
- Language: Kannada

Gowdru Hotel is a 2017 Indian Kannada-language drama directed by Pon Kumaran starring Rachan Chandra, Vedhika and Prakash Raj. The film is a remake of the Malayalam film Ustad Hotel (2012).

== Cast ==
- Rachan Chandra as Rishi
- Vedhika as Rishi's girlfriend
- Prakash Raj as Rishi's grandfather
- Anant Nag
- Raj Deepak Shetty as CEO
- Yuvan Shankar Raja (special appearance in "Kshanvu Kooda")
- Sridhar (special appearance in "Kshanvu Kooda")

== Production ==
The film is a remake of the Malayalam film Ustad Hotel (2012) and features newcomer Rachan Chandra, Vedhika, and Prakash Raj in the lead roles. The film was adapted to suit the Kannada audience. The film was shorter than the Malayalam original. Anant Nag was cast to play a role in the film. While the Malayalam film featured biriyani, this film featured mudde.

== Soundtrack ==
This film marks the Kannada debut of Tamil music composer Yuvan Shankar Raja (his previous Kannada albums were remakes).

No.	Title	Lyrics	Singer(s)	Length
1.	"Ondhe Jeevana"	Kaviraj	Yuvan Shankar Raja	3:11
2.	"Kshanvu Kooda"	Kaviraj	Yuvan Shankar Raja, Sanjana Kalamanje	3:22
3.	"Ninna Haage"	K. Kalyan	Rahul Nambiar	3:56
4.	"Gowdru Hotel Theme"	K. Kalyan	Vijay Prakash	4:04
Total length:				14:33

== Release ==
The Times of India gave the film a rating of two-and-a-half out of five stars and stated that "Go ahead, watch it if you want to check out an okay effort that is nearly salvaged in the second half".
