= Junior Senior (2002 film) =

2002 Tamil language film

- DVD cover
- Directed by: J. Suresh
- Written by: Suresh; N. Prasannakumar (dialogues)
- Produced by: P. Loganathan
- Starring: Mammootty; Hamsavardhan; Leena
- Cinematography: T. Rajesh
- Edited by: B. Lenin; V. T. Vijayan
- Music by: Yuvan Shankar Raja
- Production company: Shakthi International
- Release date: 19 April 2002
- Country: India
- Language: Tamil

Junior Senior is a 2002 Indian Tamil-language romantic comedy drama film directed by J. Suresh, starring Mammootty, Hamsavardhan and former Miss Malaysia Leena. The film was released on 19 April 2002.

== Cast ==
- Mammootty as Santhosh aka Senior
- Hamsavardhan as Shakthi aka Junior
- Leena as Indira
- Charulatha as Varsha
- Ramesh Khanna
- Charle
- Delhi Ganesh
- Pandu
- K. R. Vatsala

== Production ==
The film was shot predominantly in Kuala Lumpur, Malaysia since the entire story plays there, and was also filmed at Singapore and Thailand. Leena, who plays the female lead, is a Malaysia-born Tamilian, who was seen by director J. Suresh in Malaysia and eventually cast. She was brought into the cast after the original choice, Tejashri Khele, backed out. Hamsavardhan was injured during an action sequence.

== Soundtrack ==
The soundtrack was composed by Yuvan Shankar Raja. The song "Oh Shalalala Jamaai" was inspired by the Turkish singer Tarkan's "Şımarık".

| Song | Singer(s) | Lyrics | Duration |
|---|---|---|---|
| "Anandham Pennukulle" | P. Unnikrishnan | V. Ilango | 4:20 |
| "Naan Oruvan" | Vijay Yesudas | Pa. Vijay | 1:48 |
| "Oh Shalalala Jamaai" | Yuvan Shankar Raja, Yugendran, Premji Amaran | Pa. Vijay | 4:18 |
| "Pudhusai Pudhusai" | Srinivas, Tippu | Pa. Vijay | 4:35 |
| "Singara Kanna" | Chitra Sivaraman | Pa. Vijay | 4:23 |
| "Thithippai" | S. P. Balasubrahmanyam, Swarnalatha | Pa. Vijay | 3:36 |

== Critical reception ==
Malini Mannath of Chennai Online wrote, "The director’s style is simple, the narration moves at a steady pace, the tale being told without melodrama. The director could have got a firmer grip on the script towards the latter half". Sify wrote, "The director himself has no clue about the story. Absurd and haphazardly shot Junior Senior is one of the most insufferable movies in recent times and one wonders what made Mammootty, a great actor do this film!". Malathi Rangarajan of The Hindu wrote, ""Junior Senior" lacks cohesion completely with the link missing in most of the scenes. The director, obviously expects the viewer to make his inferences".
