= Arivum Anbum =

2020 song short film

Song by Various
- Language: Tamil
- Released: 23 April 2020
- Recorded: April 2020
- Length: 5:23
- Label: Think Music India
- Composer: Ghibran
- Lyricist: Kamal Haasan
- Producer: Raaj Kamal Films International

"Arivum Anbum" (transl. Knowledge and Love or transl. Wisdom and Love) is an Indian Tamil-language short film released on YouTube on 23 April 2020, in response to the COVID-19 pandemic in India which grew a lot of popularity and become a classic. The film was composed by Ghibran and the lyrics was written and the story and screenplay was written by Kamal Haasan. The film had cameos from 12 celebrities. Lydian Nadhaswaram has played the piano for the film.

The concept for "Arivum Anbum" was created and directed by Kamal Haasan and promoted by Think Music India. The song was recorded by the all artists from their homes and was later put together by Ghibran.

The lyrics of this song talk about the need to use our heart and intelligence to battle the crisis. It also tells us that selfless love is the key to overcome any kind of obstacle that we face in our life. The video also features visuals of the mass exodus of migrant labourers from cities across the country.

== Singers ==
- Kamal Haasan
- Yuvan Shankar Raja
- Shankar Mahadevan
- Bombay Jayashri
- Sid Sriram
- Devi Sri Prasad
- Shruti Haasan
- Andrea Jeremiah
- Siddharth
- Mugen Rao

== Production ==
Music director Ghibran said, "One day, Kamal Haasan and I got talking. It was his idea to come up with an anthem about how the world would function post the coronavirus crisis. He suggested that I compose a tune and he would pen the lyrics for the same." Kamal Haasan asked two-three days time to write the lyrics but ended up giving it in just three hours.

Ghibran revealed, "We started with Kamal sir’s portion and recorded lines with other singers. The toughest part of the song lies in the chorus. I launched a talent hunt of sorts and chose 37 aspiring singers to sing the chorus. Co-ordinating with them made the whole process interesting and challenging."

== Release and reception ==
The song was released on Think Music India YouTube channel on 23 April 2020.
