= Yuvan – Live in Concert =

2011 concert by Yuvan Shankar Raja

- Concert by Yuvan Shankar Raja
- Venue: YMCA Grounds; Nandanam, Chennai, India
- Date: 16 January 2011
- Attendance: 20,000

Yuvan Shankar Raja concert chronology
- Oru Naalil (1 Dec 2009); Yuvan – Live in Concert (16 Jan 2011)

Yuvan – Live in Concert is a concert by Indian musician Yuvan Shankar Raja. The concert, Yuvan's second in his career, took place on Pongal, 16 January 2011 at the YMCA Grounds, Nandanam, Chennai. Following the announcement, popular Tamil television STAR Vijay agreed to collaborate, sponsoring, organising and marketing the concert, while airing a special television series about Yuvan Shankar Raja, with family members and prominent celebrities closely associated to him participating, besides producing a promotional music video, titled "I'll be there for you". The five-hour show, which was attended by 20,000 people, including several noted film personalities, was received very positively and considered a highly successful event. The concert was aired on 11 and 12 February, Friday and Saturday at 2000 hrs on Vijay TV.

== Promotion ==
=== Yuvan Isai Raja ===
As a run up to the concert, STAR Vijay telecasted a 3-week, 14-part series, where several noted celebrities, film directors, actors, friends, who worked with him, and his family members participated and talked about Yuvan Shankar Raja and his music. Yuvan himself participated in two episodes of the show, which was hosted by film actor and RJ Shiva. The show was aired on weekdays at 8 pm from 27 December 2010 to 14 January 2011.

The following celebrities participated in chronological order:

1. Bhavatharini, Premji Amaran, Vasuki Bhaskar, Venkat Prabhu
2. Vishnuvardhan
3. A. R. Murugadoss
4. N. Linguswamy and Na. Muthukumar
5. Selvaraghavan
6. Faisal, Bhagavathy and Brucelee (first part), Vaibhav Reddy, Premji Amaran (second time), Aravind Akash, Vijay Vasanth and Saravanarajan (second part)
7. Ameer Sultan
8. Silambarasan Rajendar
9. Tanvi Shah, Harish Raghavendra, Madhumitha, Mukesh, Priyadarshini
10. Karthik, Vijay Yesudas, Haricharan, Sathyan, Roshini, Priya Himesh, Suvi Suresh, Ajeesh
11. Jeeva
12. Karthik Raja

Furthermore, the episodes in the third season of Vijay TV's reality-based singing competition Airtel Super Singer during the second January week in 2011, was made a Yuvan Shankar Raja special episode, with every song suny by the contestants during the episodes being Yuvan Shankar songs.

=== I'll Be There For You ===
A promotional music video for the concert, titled "I’ll Be There for You", was also made, composed and performed by Yuvan Shankar Raja himself, who also appears in the video. Pradeep Milroy Peter, programming head of Vijay TV said, "When we asked Yuvan whether we could do a music video to promote the event, he immediately accepted it", further noting that the whole process, "right from penning lyrics, to scoring music," was completed in a week. The lyrics of the song was written by Na. Muthukumar, which, according to him, would talk about "the relationship the music director and his fans shared". The video was shot in three consecutive nights at the Prasad Studios on sets created by art director Santhanam, with Vishnuvardhan directed the video, Kalyan doing the choreography and Nirav Shah handling the cinematography, who used a Red Camera for the shoot. The music video was released on 29 January 2010 at Sathyam Cinemas, with directors Venkat Prabhu, Lingusamy and Ameer attending, and was first telecasted on television on the same day.

== The concert ==
=== Setlist ===
1. I'll Be There for You – Yuvan Shankar Raja
2. Neethane (Sarvam) – Yuvan Shankar Raja
3. Nimirndhu Nil (Saroja) – Shankar Mahadevan
4. Pul Pesum (Pudhupettai) – Vijay Yesudas, Premji Amaran, Tanvi Shah
5. Thakkuthey (Baana Kaathadi) – Yuvan Shankar Raja
6. Thee Pidikka (Arinthum Ariyamalum) – Premji Amaran, Roshini
7. Siragugal (Sarvam) – Javed Ali, Madhumitha
8. Ezhezhu Thalaimurai (Goa) – Yuvan Shankar Raja, Venkat Prabhu, Karthik Raja, Bhavatharini, Premji Amaran
9. Kodana Kodi (Saroja) – Suvi Suresh, Premji Amaran
10. Idhu kadhala (Thulluvadho Ilamai) – Rinaldo J A (Contest winner)
11. Ayyayo (Paruthiveeran) – Shreya Ghoshal, Sathyan, Mukesh
12. Irava Pagala (Poovellam Kettuppar)
13. Pogathey (Deepavali) – Yuvan Shankar Raja
14. Chinnan Sirusu (Kunguma Poovum Konjum Puravum) – Javed Ali, Bela Shende
15. Loosu Penne (Vallavan) – Yuvan Shankar Raja
16. Loosu Penne (Vallavan) – Silambarasan Rajendar
17. Evandi Unna Pethan (Vaanam) – Silambarasan, Yuvan Shankar Raja
18. Kanpesum Varthaigal (7G Rainbow Colony) – Karthik
19. Thuli Thuli (Paiyaa) – Haricharan, Tanvi Shah
20. Oru Kal Oru Kannadi (Siva Manasula Sakthi) – Yuvan Shankar Raja
21. Oru Paarvaiyil (Siva Manasula Sakthi) – Sathyan
22. Merke Merke (Kanda Naal Mudhal) – Shankar Mahadevan, Bela Shende
23. Idhu Varai (Goa) – Andrea Jeremiah, Ajeesh
24. Kadhal Endral (Goa) – Yuvan Shankar Raja
25. Ninaithu Ninaithu Parthal (7G Rainbow Colony) – Shreya Ghoshal
26. Devathayai Kanden (Kaadhal Kondein) – Harish Raghavendra
27. Iragai Pole (Naan Mahaan Alla) – Yuvan Shankar Raja
28. Thathi Thaavum Paper Naan (Boss Engira Bhaskaran) – Karthik
29. Vethalaya Potendi (Billa) – Shankar Mahadevan
30. Jalsa Pannungada (Chennai 600028) – Rahul Nambiar, Haricharan, Premji Amaran, Venkat Prabhu, Karthik
31. Oru Naalil (Pudhupettai) – Yuvan Shankar Raja
32. English song – Ilayaraaja, Yuvan Shankar Raja
33. Ariyadha Vayasu (Paruthiveeran) – Ilayaraaja
34. Where Is the Party (Silambattam) – Mukesh, Priyadarshini

=== Attendees, speeches and performances ===
Speeches by:

- film director Vishnuvardhan
- film director Ameer Sultan
- film director Linguswamy
- film director Gautham Vasudev Menon
- lyricist Na. Muthukumar
- actor Arya
- actor Jeeva
- actor Jai
- actor Silambarasan
- film producer T. Siva
- actor Rajinikanth (pre-recorded message)
- actor Surya Sivakumar (pre-recorded message)

Other prominent attendees:

- Selvaraghavan and his fiancé Gitanjali
- Radhika and her daughter Varalaxmi Sarathkumar
- Naresh Iyer
- Dayanidhi Azhagiri
- Vaibhav Reddy
- Krishna
- Arvind Akash
- Mahat Raghavendra
- James Vasanthan
- SPB Charan
- Silambarasan
- Subbu Panchu
