= Anjaan (soundtrack) =

- Album cover

Soundtrack album by Yuvan Shankar Raja
- Released: 23 July 2014
- Recorded: 2013–2014
- Genre: Feature film soundtrack
- Length: 22:10
- Language: Tamil
- Label: Sony Music India
- Producer: Yuvan Shankar Raja

Yuvan Shankar Raja chronology
Thirudan Police (2013)	Anjaan (2014)	Raja Natwarlal (2014)

Anjaan is the soundtrack composed by Yuvan Shankar Raja for the 2014 Tamil film of the same name. Its Telugu version is titled Sikander. The soundtrack album features five songs, with lyrics written by four lyricists for the Tamil version, while Viveka had written two songs, Madhan Karky, Na. Muthukumar and Kabilan had written one each.

== Development ==
By August 2013, Yuvan was reported to have composed the first song, a "beautiful romantic song" written by Na. Muthukumar. The "introductory song" was written by Madhan Karky and sung by Ranjith. In January 2014, the composer worked on the remaining songs with Lingusamy and lyricist Na. Muthukumar in Singapore. In June 2014, director Lingusamy stated that Suriya would be singing one song as well, which was eventually recorded in early July at A. R. Rahman's studio within two hours. The song, which marked Suriya's playback singing debut, was described as a "breezy, peppy number" and the last to be recorded after which work on the soundtrack was completed. The Telugu version of the song was sung by composer Raghu Kunche. Vennelakanti, Ramajogayya Sastry, Chandrabose and Bhuvanachandra wrote the songs for the dubbed Telugu version.

== Release ==
The audio rights were purchased by Sony Music India for ₹75 lakh (US$89,000), including its Tamil and Telugu versions. Producer G. Dhananjayan of UTV Motion Pictures, which distributed the film had tweeted that the audio launch of the film will take place on 17 July 2014, in a grand manner. However, the audio release was rescheduled to 22 July 2014 with the team considered Chennai Trade Centre as the venue for the album release. The tracklist of the Tamil album was released on 14 July 2014.

On 17 July, the makers announced that the planned audio launch has been cancelled, due to security reasons and instead, the audio was supposedly released in the stores and online platforms directly on 23 July 2014, coinciding Suriya's birthday. A launch event was held on the same day at Sathyam Cinemas in a simple manner, with the film's cast and other celebrities being present. Videos of two songs "Bang Bang Bang" and "Ek Do Teen" and a theatrical trailer for the film were screened for selected fans.

The audio launch of the Telugu version Sikander took place on 31 July 2014 at the Shilpakala Vedika in Hyderabad, with actors Allu Arjun, Nagarjuna and director S. S. Rajamouli being present as chief guests, although it was initially reported that Kamal Haasan and Kannada star Puneeth Rajkumar would attend the function.

== Track listing ==
Tamil
No.	Title	Lyrics	Singer(s)	Length
1.	"Bang Bang Bang"	Madhan Karky	Ranjith	4:11
2.	"Oru Kan Jaadai"	Viveka	Benny Dayal, Shweta Pandit	4:23
3.	"Ek Do Theen"	Na. Muthukumar	Suriya, Andrea Jeremiah, Yuvan Shankar Raja	3:57
4.	"Kaadhal Aasai"	Kabilan	Yuvan Shankar Raja, Sooraj Santhosh	5:04
5.	"Sirippu En"	Viveka	M. M. Manasi	4:39
Total length:				22:10

Telugu
No.	Title	Lyrics	Singer(s)	Length
1.	"Bang Bang Bang"	Chandrabose	Ranjith	4:13
2.	"Thanu Gorantha"	Ramajogayya Sastry	Karthik, Deepak	4:25
3.	"Ek Do Theen"	Chandrabose	Raghu Kunche, Andrea Jeremiah	3:59
4.	"Nene Kani Nenai Undaga"	Vennelakanti	Haricharan, Deepak	5:04
5.	"Chirunavvey Speciality"	Bhuvanachandra	M. M. Manasi	4:39
Total length:				22:16

== Reception ==
The soundtrack received mixed reviews from critics. Indiaglitz stated "the album sounds quite innovative from Yuvan's regular style. Yuvan hit the first six after his 100+ albums". Akilan Nagarajan of Moviecrow gave 3.25 out of 5 and concluded, "On the whole, Anjaan may not be a Paiyya, but is definitely Yuvan back to his energetic times. He plays safe as he includes a track or two that are meant to be purely for commercial reasons and not to be taken very seriously, but nevertheless entertaining". K. Siddharth of Sify gave 3.25 out of 5 and wrote, "On the whole, Anjaan is a complete package catering to the fans of all genres consisting of a melody, rock, item number & a folkish number. Yuvan Shankar Raja makes sure he blends his experimentation along with the mass expectations. The 'Lingusamy-Yuvan Shankar Raja' track record is intact!".

In contrast, Behindwoods stated "Yuvan gives some of these familiar templates a fresh overhaul" and rated the album 2.75 out of 5.
