= Seshu =

- Movie poster
- Directed by: Jeevitha Rajasekhar
- Written by: Jeevitha Rajasekhar (dialogues)
- Screenplay by: Bala
- Story by: Bala
- Based on: Sethu (Tamil)
- Produced by: Baby Sivani
- Starring: Rajasekhar; Kaveri
- Cinematography: Hari Anumolu
- Edited by: Gowtam Raju
- Music by: Yuvan Shankar Raja; Ilaiyaraaja (unc.)
- Production company: Siva Sivani Movies
- Release date: 28 February 2002
- Running time: 144 mins
- Country: India
- Language: Telugu

Seshu is a 2002 Indian Telugu-language romantic drama film starring Rajasekhar in the title role along with Kaveri, directed by Rajasekar's wife Jeevitha Rajasekhar in her directorial debut. It is a remake of the 1999 hit Tamil film Sethu, directed by Bala. The film was released on 28 February 2002. It marks the Telugu debut of Tamil film music composer Yuvan Shankar Raja, son of the music composer Ilaiyaraaja. The film was a failure at the box-office.

== Plot ==
Seshu aka Chiya is a rough and macho college rowdy and also The Students Union Chairman of the college, who uses violence as the only way to deal with people. He lives with his brother, a Magistrate, and his sister-in-law, who is the only person who seems to understand him properly.

The movie opens with Seshu winning the elections to the office bearers of the college's Students Union followed by celebrations and in-campus fight between the rival candidates.

Seshu has a staple diet of yes-sir friends surrounding him. He comes across a timid girl, Abhitukuchalamba aka Abithu, who is the daughter of a poor temple priest, and starts to woo her. When she initially rejects him, he kidnaps her and forces her to fall in love with him.

When the girl falls in love with him, Seshu is attacked by brothel goons who take revenge on him for interfering with their business. Seshu suffers from brain damage as a result and ends up in a swamiji ashram. With no memory of his past and having developed an unusual behaviour, he starts to recollect memories. At one point, he is completely back to his normal self and tries to convince the Swamiji and the wardens that he's back to normal and can be released. However, the Swamiji ignores him and the wardens beat him up. A desperate Seshu then tries to escape the ashram by climbing over the gates. Unfortunately, he fails and ends up with serious injuries.

Whilst sleeping with his injury, Abithu makes a surprise visit. However Seshu is asleep and she leaves with this woeful memory of him. As she is about to leave the institution, he wakes up and realises that she had come to see him. As he calls out, she leaves unable to hear him.

Persistent to meet her he makes another attempt to leave the institution and this time he is successful. When he arrives at her house he is presented with Abhita unfortunately dead. He then realises that she had committed suicide.

Distraught after what he saw, Seshu just walks out and his previous friends and family try to help him remember who he is. Despite being aware of what's happening around him, Seshu pretends to be unconscious. At that point, he is met with the mental institution wardens who came chasing after him. The film ends with Seshu leaving with them as he has nothing to live for after his true love's death.

== Cast ==
- Rajasekhar as Seshu a.k.a. Chiya
- Kaveri as Abhitukuchalamba a.k.a. Abithu
- Ganesh as Seshu's friend
- Nassar as Seshu's brother
- Sriman as Seshu's best friend
- Anju Mahendran as Seshu's friend
- Lavanya as Abithu's sister
- Mohini Patel
- Nakuul Mehta
- Mohan Vaidya as Abithu's uncle
- Jyothi Lakshmi as the old lady dancer in the "Cheeya Cheeya" song

== Soundtrack ==
The music, including film score and soundtrack, was composed by noted Tamil film composer Yuvan Shankar Raja, who debuted in Telugu with this film. Incidentally, his father Ilaiyaraaja had composed music for the original version. The soundtrack features 8 tracks, out of which four songs were retained from the original soundtrack, composed by Ilaiyaraaja. "Edidari Batasari", "Mana Seshu Anna", "Goodu Vadilithiva" and "Merisi Merisi" were reused from "Enge Sellum", "Sethuvukku Sethuvukku", " Varthai Thavari Vittai" and "Nenachu Nenachu", respectively. The soundtrack doesn't feature any female vocals. The lyrics were penned by Chandrabose and Sri Harsha.

Track list
No.	Title	Music	Singer(s)	Length
1.	"Edidari Batasari"	Ilaiyaraaja	S. P. Balasubrahmanyam	05:07
2.	"Aakasam Kindundi"	Yuvan Shankar Raja	Tippu, Yuvan Shankar Raja, Srinivas	05:13
3.	"Sayantram Cheruvyindo"	Yuvan Shankar Raja	Shankar Mahadevan	04:06
4.	"Mana Seshu Anna"	Ilaiyaraaja	S. P. Balasubrahmanyam	02:27
5.	"Cheeya Cheeya"	Yuvan Shankar Raja	Devan Ekambaram	05:12
6.	"Goodu Vadilithiva"	Ilaiyaraaja	S. P. Balasubrahmanyam	03:01
7.	"Merisi Merisi"	Ilaiyaraaja	P. Unnikrishnan	00:47
8.	"Theme Music"	Ilaiyaraaja	Instrumental	05:13
Total length:				34:03

== Reception ==
Gudipoodi Srihari of The Hindu wrote that "By using a medical college as the backdrop, the story has gained nothing, except having middle aged Rajasekhar in the role of a medico. Kaveri, in contrast, looks docile, and performs well.". Jeevi of Idlebrain.com rated the film three out of five and wrote that "It's a must watch for all the people who like Raja Sekhar. For a regular moviegoer, this film does not offer anything exciting except for Raja Sekhar's histrionics". A critic from Sify wrote that "On the whole the film is morbid and depressing, especially the second half". A critic from Full Hyderabad wrote that "A strange story supposedly inspired from the Tamil hit Sethu, this one has nothing to attract anyone except for the staunchest Rajashekhar fan". Andhra Today wrote "Although it is a simple love story, the creative imagination of the director is seen in the sequences and locations chosen and give the audience the experience of variety. The climax will disappoint the audience with the heroine being killed and the hero turning insane, filling the whole movie with negativity and helplessness. The movie does not give us the impression that it is the debut venture of Jeevitha".
