= Velai =

- Directed by: Suresh
- Written by: Suresh; Balakumaran (dialogues)
- Produced by: J. Vasudevan
- Starring: Vignesh; Indraja; Nassar
- Cinematography: C Vijayasri
- Edited by: B. Lenin; V. T. Vijayan
- Music by: Yuvan Shankar Raja
- Production company: J. V. Films
- Distributed by: Tara Creations
- Release date: 26 February 1998
- Country: India
- Language: Tamil

Velai (/ˈveɪlaɪ/ transl. Work) is a 1998 Indian Tamil-language film, directed by Suresh and written by Balakumaran, starring Vignesh, Indraja and Nassar. It was released on 26 February 1998.

== Cast ==
- Vignesh as Ganesh
- Indraja
- Nassar
- Hemanth
- Lathif
- Vadivukkarasi
- Balu Anand
- Charle
- Charuhasan
- Raghavi
- Chokkalinga Bhagavathar
- Major Sundarrajan
- Ponvannan
- Santhana Bharathi
- Thalaivasal Vijay

== Production ==
Velai is the debut for director Suresh and cinematographer Vijayasri.

== Soundtrack ==
The soundtrack was composed by Yuvan Shankar Raja. Popular Tamil actor Vijay had sung one of the songs along with Premji Amaran though he did not act in the film, lending his voice to Vignesh while Nassar who acted in this film was introduced as playback singer.

Song	Singer(s)	Duration	Lyrics	Notes
"Achutha Achutha"	Yuvan Shankar Raja, Premji Amaran	4:40	Palani Bharathi	
"Oyvedu Nilave"	Hariharan, Bhavatharini	4:47	R. V. Udayakumar	
"Kanni Ponnu"	Pop Shalini	4:23	Ravi Bharathi	
"Kaalathuketha Oru Gana"	Vijay, Nassar, Premji Amaran	5:08	Ravi Bharathi	
"Kunnooru Poochadi"	Udit Narayan, Sujatha Mohan	4:38	Arivumathi	

== Critical reception ==
D. S. Ramanujam of The Hindu wrote, "Apart from direction, it is the story and screenplay that makes or breaks a movie. J. V. Films' ``Velai'' suffers from inadequacy in all these aspects, its publicity slogan `relax - no tension' aptly fitting the movie".
