= Azhagai Irukkirai Bayamai Irukkirathu =

- DVD cover
- Directed by: S. D. Vijay Milton
- Written by: S. D. Vijay Milton
- Produced by: Cheran
- Starring: Bharath; Arun Vijay; Mallika Kapoor
- Narrated by: R. Parthiban
- Cinematography: S. D. Vijay Milton
- Edited by: G. Sasikumar
- Music by: Yuvan Shankar Raja
- Production company: Dream Theatres
- Release date: 14 April 2006
- Running time: 157 minutes
- Country: India
- Language: Tamil

Azhagai Irukkirai Bayamai Irukkirathu (transl. You look beautiful, (so) I'm scared!) also known by the initialism AIBI, is a 2006 Indian Tamil-language romantic comedy film written, directed and photographed by S. D. Vijay Milton, in his directorial debut. It stars Bharath and Mallika Kapoor (making her Tamil film debut) with Arun Vijay (credited as Arun Kumar), Deepu, Renuka and M. S. Bhaskar in vital supporting roles. The film's score and soundtrack are composed by Yuvan Shankar Raja. The film, inspired by the 1997 American film Addicted to Love, was released on 14 April 2006. The story tells a love relationship between two playful youngsters and their sacrifices.

== Plot ==
Mano loves Nandhini, but Nandhini is in love with Prem. On the other hand, he meets Jo who is in love with Prem. The two team up to break them apart so that Mano can be with Nandhini and Jo with Prem.Then they both try to break Prem's love with Nandhini and succeed. Mano realises Jo's deep love for Prem and unites them. Mano succeeds in making Prem fall in love with Jo. Finally, Jo and Prem get married. During the story, the twists reveal that Mano had originally been in love with Jo but secretly tried to engage into her life by pretending to be in love with Nandhini. Soon after realising her true love for Prem, he sacrifices his love for her and brings Prem and Jo together. Only in the last several scenes does Jo realise Mano's love for her, but she chooses to go with Prem.

== Cast ==
- Bharath as Mano
- Arun Vijay as Prem
- Mallika Kapoor as Jyothilakshmi (Jo)
- Deepu as Nandhini
- Renuka as Malar
- M. S. Bhaskar as Manager
- Lakshmanan as Karuppu
- GLN Murthy as Artist
- Aarthi
- R. Parthiban (voice over)

== Production ==
When Arun Vijay was offered to act in the film directed by S. D. Vijay Milton, he was hesitant as he was being considered by Cheran for another film, but Cheran encouraged him to accept Milton's film if he liked the story. The film was primarily shot in Ooty. Bharath, the lead actor, struggled to memorise his lines during the filming of the climax scene as Milton would frequently give him new lines at short notice.

== Soundtrack ==
The music of Azhagai Irukkirai Bayamai Irukkirathu was scored by Yuvan Shankar Raja and includes composing the soundtrack which was released on 25 March 2006. Milton revealed that first the scenes were shot and Yuvan composed the tunes only after watching the filmed scenes.

Song	Lyricist	Singer(s)	Length
"Kanavae Kalaigirathe"	Rajamurugan	Yuvan Shankar Raja, Bhavatharini	4:32
"Elaiyudhir Kaalam"	Na. Muthukumar	Yuvan Shankar Raja, Bhavatharini, Bobby, Rita, Reshmi, Ranjith, Naveen Madhav	4:42
"Kaadhalai Pirippadhu"	Na. Muthukumar	Bharath, Devan, Premji Amaran, Ranjith, Suchitra, Pushpavanam Kuppusamy, Yuvan Shankar Raja, Paravai Muniyamma, Sujatha Mohan, Naveen Madhav	6:24
"Odivaa Kaadhalae"	Rajamurugan	Karthik, Yuvan Shankar Raja, Raju Krishnamurthy	3:08
"Orampo Naina"	Rajamurugan	Premji Amaran, Yuvan Shankar Raja, Raju Krishnamurthy	6:15

== Reception ==
Malini Mannath of Chennai Online wrote that " 'Azhagai...' is a fairly engaging family entertainer, the frothy, bubbly feel-good type". Lajjavathi of Kalki felt if the director had left aside technology and graphics and given importance only to human emotions, she might have said the film is very beautiful, but now she was afraid to say that.
