= Aravindhan =

- VCD cover
- Directed by: T. Nagarajan
- Written by: T. Nagarajan; Liyakath Ali Khan (dialogues)
- Produced by: T. Siva
- Starring: Sarathkumar; Parthiban; Nagma; Oorvasi
- Cinematography: R. Rathnavelu
- Music by: Yuvan Shankar Raja
- Production company: Amma Creations
- Release date: 16 February 1997
- Country: India
- Language: Tamil

Aravindhan is a 1997 Indian Tamil-language political thriller film written and directed by newcomer T. Nagarajan and produced by T. Siva. The film stars Sarathkumar as the titular character, alongside Parthiban, Nagma, and Oorvasi in the lead roles, while Visu, Prakash Raj, Anandaraj, and Thilakan play supporting roles. The film marks the debut of noted music composer Yuvan Shankar Raja, musician Ilaiyaraaja's youngest son, and the debut of cinematographer R. Rathnavelu. The film is based on the 1968 Kilvenmani massacre, in which 44 people were burnt alive. It was released on 16 February 1997, and failed at the box-office.

== Plot ==
Aravindhan is preparing to clear IPS to become a police officer. But after he sees Thamizhvannan, shown as a Naxalite, being shot dead by police, Aravindhan starts a fight against police and corrupt politicians. Aravindhan gets supported by the people for his strict fight against corruption. Anu loves Aravindhan, but her father does not accept the relation. The police wants to put Aravindhan in jail for the politicians, so Aravindhan goes into hiding. On the way, he hides in Gayathri's home. The police tries to catch Aravindhan but at the same time, thinks Gayathri tried to give shelter to Aravindhan, so Gayathri's father dies. Now Aravindhan understands that he has to save Gayathri, so he takes her with him to a factory area to stay.

Aravindhan works in the factory, and life goes along smooth for him as he marries Gayathri and has a child. Once in the factory, the manager does not give a fair price to the workers, which Aravindhan protests, so he beats the manager very poorly. The factory people now identify Aravindhan's true identity as a Naxalite. The police comes in search of Aravindhan, who finally surrenders in court. In jail, Aravindhan writes many anti-corruption articles. This gives Aravindhan wide public support to get elected as a minister. The corrupt politicians want to avoid this uprising and hire a gunman to shoot Aravindhan. During a stage speaking with many people around, the gunman shoots and kills Aravindhan, thus precluding him from becoming minister.

== Cast ==
- Sarathkumar as Aravindhan
- Parthiban as Thamizhvannan
- Nagma as Anu
- Urvashi as Gayathri
- Visu
- Prakash Raj as Rama Ganapathy
- Anandaraj as Ramanathan
- Thilakan as Gopalakrishnan Naidu
- Thalaivasal Vijay as Muthukrishnan
- Delhi Ganesh
- Vichithra as an item girl in the song "Poovattam"
- Ponnambalam
- Venkat Prabhu as a rapper (uncredited cameo appearance in the song "Hey Ponnamma")
- Hemanth Ravan
- Vijay Krishnaraj
- Sembuli Jagan
- Liaqath Ali Khan
- Jayanth
- Madhan

== Production ==
Some of the scenes (incl. the song "Poovattam") were shot at Neyveli Coal Mining and at NLC.

== Soundtrack ==
The music was composed by Ilaiyaraaja's youngest son, Yuvan Shankar Raja, who made his debut in this film. T. Siva, the producer of the film, after hearing some of Yuvan's tunes, asked him to compose a trailer music and after being impressed of it, gave Yuvan the assignment to compose the entire film score including a soundtrack for that film. Yuvan was 17 years old at the time of the release and one of the youngest composers ever in the industry. Harris Jayaraj worked on the background score for around 10 days.

Track listing
No.	Title	Lyrics	Singer(s)	Length
1.	"All The Best"	Palani Bharathi	Bhavatharini, Hariharan	5:40
2.	"Hey Ponnamma, Un Lovvu Yaaru Sollamma"	Palani Bharathi	Yuvan Shankar Raja, Mano, Sumangali, Yogi	4:58
3.	"Thanga Sooriyan"	Kadhal Mathi	Swarnalatha, Mano	4:15
4.	"Sutrum Bhoomi"	Paarthi Bhaskar	P. Jayachandran, Chorus	2:52
5.	"Pothum Idhu Pothum"	Palani Bharathi	P. Unnikrishnan	2:35
6.	"Poovattam"	Kadhal Mathi	T. L. Maharajan, Swarnalatha	4:48
7.	"Eera Nila"	Palani Bharathi	S. P. Balasubrahmanyam, Mahanadi Shobana	4:53
Total length:				30:01

== Release and reception ==
The film was released on 16 February 1997, and failed at the box-office. R. P. R. of Kalki found Rathnavelu's cinematography and Yuvan's music as the only positives and concluded that the director tried to convey a message of non-violence but for the commercial needs he sacrificed the whole film for the violence.
