= Yuvan Shankar Raja =

Indian composer and playback singer (born 1979)

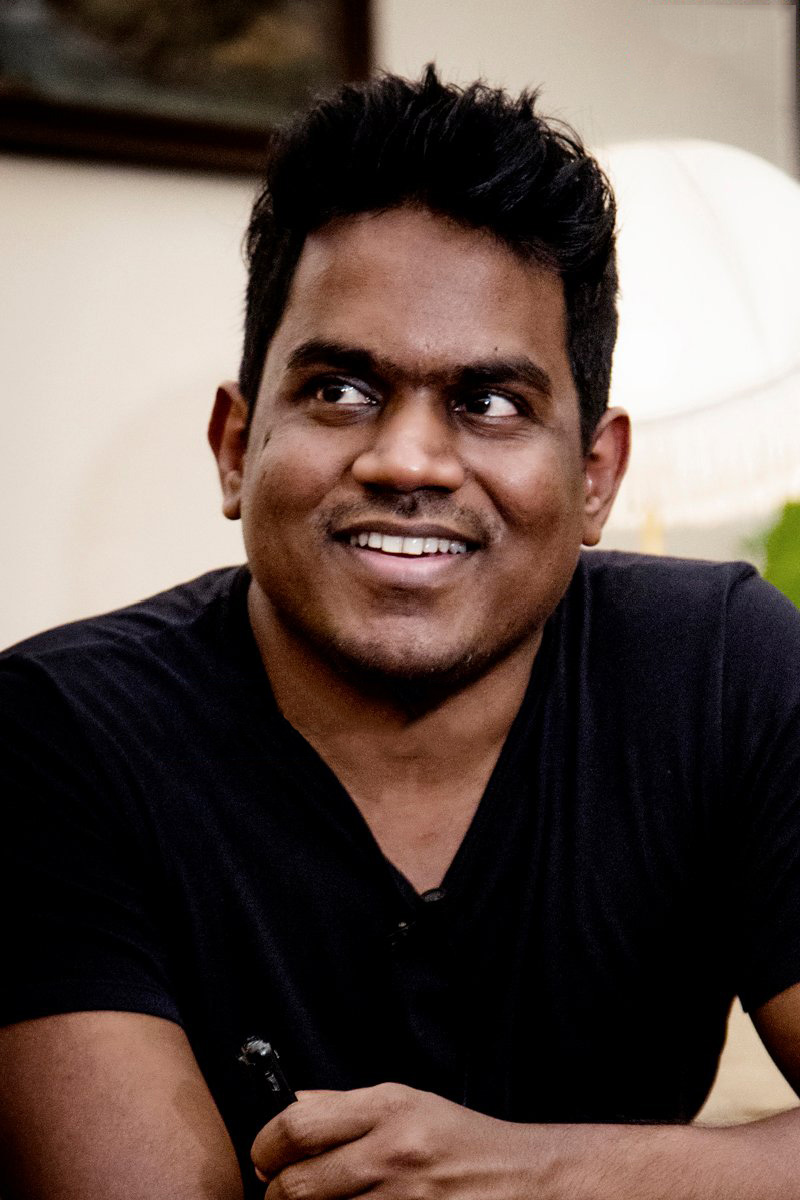
- Yuvan Shankar Raja in 2014

Background information
- Also known as: BGM King; Little Maestro; U1
- Born: Yuvan Shankar Raja; 31 August 1979 (age 47); Madras, Tamil Nadu, India
- Origin: Pannaipuram, Tamil Nadu
- Education: Trinity Laban (Piano)
- Genres: Film score; world music; Jazz; Rock; Folk; Classical
- Occupations: Arranger; Composer; Film producer; Lyricist; Playback singer; Record producer; Song writer
- Instruments: Guitar; keyboard; vocals; Piano
- Works: Full list
- Years active: 1996–present
- Labels: Aditya; Divo; Eros; Lahari; Saregama; Sony Music; Think Music; T-Series; U1 Records; Wunderbar; Zee
- Spouses: Sujaya Chandran (m. 2005; div. 2008); Shilpa Mohan (m. 2011; div. 2014); Zafroon Nizar (m. 2015)
- Website: theu1niverse.com

Yuvan Shankar Raja (born 31 August 1979; known officially as Abdul Haliq), also known as U1, is an Indian composer and playback singer. He mainly scores music for Tamil films along with few Telugu, Kannada, and Hindi films. Considered a versatile composer, he is particularly known for his use of Western music elements and often credited with having introduced hip hop to the Tamil film and music industry and started the "era of remixes" in Tamil Nadu which included mixed EDM and jazz. He is frequently referred to as the "BGM King" of Tamil film music. Yuvan has won two Filmfare Awards South, five Mirchi Music Awards South, three Vijay Awards and two Tamil Nadu State Film Awards.

Within a span of 25 years, Yuvan has worked on over 190 films. Being the youngest son of composer Ilaiyaraaja, he began his musical career in 1996, at the age of 17, when he composed the film score for Aravindhan. He got his breakthrough with the soundtracks for the films Dheena (2001) and Thulluvadho Ilamai (2002) soundtrack, becoming one of Tamil cinema's most sought-after composers by the mid-2000s. He won the Filmfare Award for Best Music Director – Tamil in 2004 for his score in the drama 7G Rainbow Colony. In 2006, he became the only Indian composer to win the Cyprus International Film Festival Award for the soundtrack of Raam. He also won the Filmfare Special Award – South in 2009 for his Telugu musical Oy!.

In 2015, Yuvan created his own music label, U1 Records and in 2017, he started his own film production studio, YSR Films.

== Early life ==
Yuvan Shankar Raja was born on 31 August 1979. He is the third and youngest child of musician and film composer Ilaiyaraaja. He is the younger brother of music director Karthik Raja and playback singer-music director Bhavatharini. Yuvan once confessed that his brother Karthik Raja was more talented than him, but he did not get a successful break into the music business since he did not get a "good team to work with". His father as well as his siblings have sung many songs under his direction. Film director and film composer Gangai Amaran and R. D. Bhaskar are his uncles and their sons Venkat Prabhu, Premgi Amaren and Parthi Bhaskar, who are working in the Tamil film industry as well, are his cousins.

Yuvan did his schooling at St. Bede's Anglo Indian Higher Secondary School in Chennai, and discontinued his education after his tenth class. He started learning music from Jacob Master, attending piano classes at "Musee Musical" in Chennai, which is affiliated to Trinity College of Music in London, UK.

Yuvan Shankar Raja stated that he always wanted to become a pilot and travel "all around the world", but as he grew up "with music around him", he eventually became a musician. He admires the work of his father and other composers such as S. D. Burman, R. D. Burman, M. S. Viswanathan and Naushad Ali and the voices of singers Lata Mangeshkar, Asha Bhosle, P. B. Sreenivas, S. P. Balasubrahmanyam, and P. Susheela.

== Career ==
=== Film score and soundtracks ===
==== Early years (1996–2001) ====
In 1996, following his mother's suggestion to take up music as a profession, Yuvan Shankar Raja started composing tunes for an album. T. Siva, the producer of the Tamil language film Aravindhan, after hearing some of the tunes, asked him to compose a trailer music score. As Siva was impressed by the music, he gave Yuvan Shankar the assignment to compose the entire film score, including a soundtrack for that film. After consulting and getting consent from his parents, he accepted the offer; his music career started. His entry into the Tamil film and music little superstar industry had happened at age 16, thus he became one of the youngest composers ever in the industry, which he says, was "purely accidental".

However, both the soundtrack album as well as the film itself failed to attract audiences and do well, and Yuvan Shankar Raja's following projects Velai (1998) and Kalyana Galatta (1998) were not successful either; his compositions for these films did not receive good reviews or responses, with one reviewer labelling the music and background score in the latter as "cacophony" and "poor". The failures of his first projects meant that he was not offered any film projects and assignments subsequently. During this time of struggle, he was approached and assigned by director Vasanth to compose the music for his film Poovellam Kettuppar (1999). The soundtrack received a very positive response, being described as "fresh" and "different", with a critic from The New Indian Express citing that his "absolutely enchanting musical score [...] bears testimony to his "Raja" surname." The album became very popular, particularly songs such as "Irava Pagala" and "Chudithar Aninthu", gaining him first time notice, especially among young people and children. The album would make possible his first breakthrough in the industry and proved to be a major turning point in his career. After working for two Sundar C films, Unakkaga Ellam Unakkaga (1999) and Rishi (2000), he got to work for A. R. Murugadoss's directorial debut in 2001, the action flick Dheena, starring Ajith Kumar, which went on to become a blockbuster and Yuvan Shankar Raja's first major successful film. Yuvan Shankar's songs were equally successful, which are considered to have played a major role in the film's great success, while his background score in the film was also well appreciated. This was followed by Bala's Nandhaa (2001), for which he received rave reviews.

==== Rise to prominence (2002–2003) ====
In 2002, he had three album releases, the first being Thulluvadho Ilamai, collaborating with Selvaraghavan for the first time. The film was directed by Kasthuri Raja, but his son Selvaraghavan wrote the script and worked with Yuvan Shankar Raja for the film's soundtrack album. The soundtrack album of Thulluvadho Ilamai particularly appealed to the younger generation. The film itself, marking the debut of Selvaraghavan's brother Dhanush, released one year later and became a sleeper hit at the Chennai box office. He then gained notice by churning out "youthful music" in the college-life based April Maadhathil (2002), the romantic comedy films Kadhal Samrajyam (2002) (The film was never released theatrically, the soundtrack was released in 2002) and Mounam Pesiyadhe (2002), Ameer's directorial debut film, and the triangular love story Punnagai Poove (2002), in which he also made his on-screen debut, appearing in some scenes and one song sequence. At the same time, he made his Telugu debut with Seshu and Malli Malli Chudali and also composed for the Tamil films Junior Senior and Pop Carn, starring Malayalam actors Mammootty and Mohanlal, respectively, though all of which performed poorly at the box office.

In 2003, Selvaraghavan's first independent directorial, the drama-thriller film Kaadhal Kondein released, which is considered a milestone for Yuvan Shankar Raja. His work in the film, particularly his background score, was unanimously praised, leading to the release of a separate CD consisting of several film score pieces, à la "Hollywood-style", which was reportedly the first film score CD release in India. Furthermore, the film went on to become a blockbuster, cementing the film's lead artist Dhanush and Yuvan Shankar in the Tamil film and music industry. The same year, he worked in Vishnuvardhan's debut film Kurumbu, which featured the first remix song in a Tamil film. By that time, in a career spanning less than a decade, Yuvan Shankar Raja had established himself as one of the leading and most-sought after music directors in the Tamil film industry, despite having worked predominantly with newcomers and in low-budget productions.

==== Peak Success (2004–2007) ====
Yuvan Shankar's 2004 releases, 7G Rainbow Colony, another Selvaraghavan film, and Silambarasan's Manmadhan, were both critically and commercially successful films, featuring acclaimed as well as popular music by Yuvan Shankar Raja, which also contributed to the films' successes. His work in the former, in particular, got critically acclaimed and eventually led him to win the Best Music Direction Award at the 2004 Filmfare Awards South; receiving the award at the age of 25, he was the youngest winning music composer of the award at that time. For the next several years, he would have nine to ten releases every year on average, making him one of the most prolific film composers of India.

His first of nine album releases of 2005 was Raam. His score for the Ameer-directed thriller, labelled as "soul-stirring", fetched him further accolades and eventually yielded a win at the 2006 Cyprus International Film Festival for Best Musical score in a Feature Film, the first such award for an Indian composer. His successful streak continued with his following releases of that year, the low-budget films Arinthum Ariyamalum, Kanda Naal Mudhal and Sandakozhi becoming successful ventures at the box office; Yuvan Shankar's songs, "Theepidikka", "Panithuli" and "Dhavani Potta" from the respective soundtracks enjoyed popularity and were said to have played an important role in the films's successes. After the release of the soundtrack for the S. J. Suryah-starring romantic comedy Kalvanin Kadhali, that also enjoyed popularity after the film's release, his final album of 2005, Pudhupettai, released, which saw him once again collaborating with director Selvaraghavan. The ten-track experimental album, receiving high critical acclaim, was considered Yuvan Shankar Raja's finest work till then and a "musical masterpiece". The soundtrack and score of the film featured a traditional orchestral score played by the "Chapraya Symphony" of Bangkok, for the first time in a Tamil film. Critics felt that this project, in particular, proved his abilities and talent to produce innovative and experimental scores as well. The film itself, releasing only in May 2006, did average business, despite opening to outstanding reviews.

He next worked on the romantic comedies Happy and Azhagai Irukkirai Bayamai Irukkirathu and the gangster film Pattiyal, which all released in early 2006. His Happy songs and score received positive reviews, with critics labelling the "youthful music" as "excellent", and the film's "main strength", while his score for Pattiyal was highly praised by critics; a Sify reviewer wrote: "Yuvan Shankar Raja's music and background score is the life of the film". Furthermore, both films went on to become very successful ventures, both commercially and critically. His subsequent releases that year include Silambarasan's directorial debut Vallavan and the action entertainer Thimiru. Yuvan Shankar Raja was cited as the "real hero" of the former, which featured some of the year's most listened-to tracks such as "Loosu Penne" and "Yammadi Aathadi", while the latter film ranked amongst the year's highest-grossing films. In November 2006, the Paruthiveeran soundtrack album got released, which saw the composer foraying into pure rural folk music, using traditional musical instruments. Though initially releasing to mixed reviews, with critics doubting whether the songs could attract a modern youth audience, his first attempt at rural music turned out to be a major success, following the film's outstanding run at the box office. The film, Ameer's third feature film as well as Karthi's debut venture, received universal critical acclaim after its release in February 2007 and became a blockbuster, while particularly the song "Oororam Puliyamaram" was a chartbuster number in Tamil Nadu.

In 2007, he had a record ten album releases in one year. The first was the soundtrack of the romantic drama film Deepavali, following which the audios of the sports comedy film Chennai 600028, the Telugu family entertainer Aadavari Matalaku Ardhalu Verule, Vasanth's thriller film Satham Podathey and the romantic films Thottal Poo Malarum and Kannamoochi Yenada released, with the former three being well-received besides garnering positive reviews. The films Chennai 600028, Venkat Prabhu's directorial debut, and Aadavari Matalaku Ardhalu Verule, Selvaraghavan's Telugu debut, in particular, were great commercial successes and became some of the year's most successful films in Tamil and Telugu, respectively. In late 2007, the film Kattradhu Thamizh and its soundtrack got released. The soundtrack album, which was released as Tamil M. A., as well as the film itself, had been met with positive reviews and critical acclaim. The music was called a "musical sensation" and was noted to be a "proof" of Yuvan Shankar Raja's "composing skills". However, despite positive reviews by critics, the film failed to evoke the interest of the audience and did not enjoy much popularity. His final release of 2007 was Billa, a remake of the 1980 Rajinikanth-starrer of the same title. This film, remade by Vishnuvardhan, starring Ajith Kumar in the title role, also featured two remixes from the original version. The film emerged one of the top-grossers of the year, while also fetching positive reviews for Yuvan Shankar's stylish musical score.

==== More achievements (2008–2012) ====
In 2008, five films, featuring Yuvan's music were released, two of them being the Tamil and Kannada remakes of Aadavari Matalaku Ardhalu Verule, titled Yaaradi Nee Mohini and Anthu Inthu Preethi Banthu, respectively, which partly featured the original score and songs. The Tamil version, in particular, was able to repeat the success of the original film, emerging as a high commercial success, while yielding Yuvan his second Filmfare nomination. The other releases that year include Seeman's Vaazhthugal, Venkat Prabhu's comedy-thriller Saroja, Ajith Kumar's action thriller Aegan and Silambarasan's masala flick Silambattam, out of which, Saroja and Silambattam proved to be successful at the box office, with Yuvan Shankar's score in the former and his songs in the latter garnering accolades and several awards at the 2009 Isaiyaruvi Tamil Music Awards. In 2009, nine of his soundtrack albums released. Excluding the romantic comedy Siva Manasula Sakthi, featuring his most popular song of the year "Oru Kal Oru Kannadi", all other films failed at the box office. Besides "Oru Kal", the songs "Siragual" (Sarvam) and "Aedho Saigiral" (Vaamanan) also became popular. He had provided a rural score again in Kunguma Poovum Konjum Puravum and a sarangi-based score for the urban action drama of Ameer's Yogi. His score for his Telugu romantic musical Oy! fetched him the Special Jury Award at the 2010 South Filmfare Awards.

In late 2009, the soundtrack album of Paiyaa released, which was regarded as a "blockbuster album" and a "magnum opus", as it went on to become highly popular, much prior to the film's release, and one of Yuvan Shankar Raja's biggest successes of his career. The song "Thuli Thuli" had become the first Tamil song to be featured in the India Top 20 list for April 2010, indicating that it was the most frequently played Tamil song on all Indian FM radio stations in the history of Tamil film music. The film itself became one of the highest earners of the year, particularly supported by Yuvan's score and songs. Along with Paiyaa, songs from three more films for which he composed music that year – Naan Mahaan Alla, Baana Kaathadi and Boss Engira Bhaskaran – featured among the Top 10 chartbusters of the year. In early 2010, he composed his first Bollywood song; "Haq Se", as part of the ensemble soundtrack of the film Striker, starring his close friend Siddharth, which received thoroughly positive reviews. In 2011, he teamed up with Silambarasan again for the anthology film Vaanam, with the song "Evan Di Unna Pethan" from the album, that was released as a single, gaining popularity. His next film was Bala's Avan Ivan; Yuvan's songs generally fetched positive reviews. He next composed a score that drew influence from several world music styles for the critically acclaimed independent gangster film Aaranya Kaandam, winning high praise from critics. He went on to work in Venkat Prabhu's action thriller Mankatha, his biggest project till date, and Vishnuvardhan's first Telugu venture Panjaa. His last two releases of 2011 were the soundtrack albums to the action-masala films Rajapattai and Vettai, both of which received mixed responses and failed to reach success. His 2012 works include Billa II, starring Ajith Kumar, Ameer's long-delayed Aadhi Bhagavan and Vasanth's Moondru Per Moondru Kadhal.

==== 2013 to 2019 ====
In 2013, he contributed music to nine films. Tracks from Kedi Billa Killadi Ranga were generally received positively by critics. For Moondru Per Moondru Kadal, directed by Vasanth, Yuvan spent almost seven months working on the film's six-track soundtrack. The soundtrack was widely acclaimed and cited as "arguably his best album in 2013". Director Vasanth described the album as "post-modern music". His collaboration with veteran composer M.S. Viswanathan in Thillu Mullu was a unique endeavor. Yuvan composed the soundtrack for Suseenthiran's romantic drama Aadhalal Kadhal Seiveer. The album garnered mixed to positive reviews, and the music supported the film's "highly positive reviews" and success. A profound highlight was his work on Thanga Meenkal, where the emotional depth of the film was significantly amplified by his score, particularly through the song "Aanandha Yaazhai," which garnered "rave reviews" and was "celebrated across Tamil Nadu". The music of Arrambam, which topped various music charts and achieved strong CD sales. This year also saw him reach his 100th movie milestone with Biryani, a collaboration with director Venkat Prabhu. The soundtrack was met with a "positive response".

In 2014, nine movies, featuring Yuvan's music were released, two of them non-Tamil movies; the Telugu film Govindudu Andarivadele and the Hindi film Raja Natwarlal, which marked Yuvan's Bollywood debut. The other releases that year, which included Thirudan Police, Anjaan and Poojai proved to be commercially successful, whereas Vanavarayan Vallavarayan released with positive reviews from critics. In Vadacurry, he has done only one song in the album. In 2015 Vai Raja Vai, Masss and Yatchan, which were released. whereas the visuals of Idam Porul Eval remain unreleased.

His next film was Dharmadurai, which marked the second collaboration with lyricist Vairamuthu and director Seenu Ramasamy after Idam Porul Eval. and Chennai 600028 II, Nenjam Marappathillai, Yaakkai and Taramani were the movies scored by him in 2016.

In 2017, seven films, namely Sathriyan, Kadamban, Anbanavan Asaradhavan Adangadhavan, Gowdru Hotel (his straight Kannada debut), the Telugu film Oxygen, Semma Botha Aagathey and Balloon released.

2018 saw the release of Irumbu Thirai which notably became his 125th project. and Raja Ranguski, Peranbu, Pyaar Prema Kaadhal, Genius, Sandakozhi 2, Maari 2. The song "Rowdy Baby" from Maari 2 garnered a billion views on YouTube. Rowdy Baby became the first south Indian song to have garnered 1 billion+ views on YouTube.

In 2019, Kanne Kalaimaane, Super Deluxe, NGK, Sindhubaadh, Kazhugu 2, Nerkonda Paarvai and Hero released.

==== 2021 to present ====
In 2021, he had seven releases namely Koozhangal, Kalathil Santhippom, Chakra, Nenjam Marappathillai, Dikkiloona, Maanaadu and Plan Panni Pannanum.

Yuvan had ten album releases in 2022. He collaborated with Pradeep Ranganathan for Love Today, which received a huge response from audience and positive mention from critics. Viruman, Naane Varuvean, 1945, Veeramae Vaagai Soodum, Coffee with Kadhal, Agent Kannayiram and Laththi released in 2022.

In 2023, Yuvan collaborated with his father Ilaiyaraaja on Custody, their second joint project after Maamanithan. Yuvan composed one song and also contributed to the film's background score. He composed music for Amazon web-series Modern Love Chennai.

In 2024, Yuvan reunited with Vijay after two decades for The Greatest of All Time, marking their second collaboration after Puthiya Geethai (2003). The first single, "Whistle Podu", featured vocals by Vijay and Yuvan. Yuvan later revealed that Vijay had sung one more song in the film. The song, "Chinna Chinna Kangal", was subsequently released as the second single on Vijay's birthday and featured vocals by Vijay alongside AI-recreated vocals of Yuvan's late sister Bhavatharani. Yuvan revealed that he and director Venkat Prabhu had originally intended for Bhavatharini to sing the song, but following her passing, her voice was recreated using AI. He described the experience as a "bittersweet moment".

==== Other languages ====
Besides Tamil films, he has also scored music for films in other South Indian languages. Around 35 of the Tamil films, for which he had composed music, were afterwards dubbed into Telugu, Kannada or Malayalam languages as were the respective soundtracks. Apart from these ones, he also worked "straightly" on Telugu projects such as Seshu, Malli Malli Chudali, Happy, Raam, Raju Bhai and Aadavari Matalaku Arthale Verule and Oy!, making him well-known and popular in Telugu cinema also. He also worked on the soundtrack for Panjaa. Yuvan's Oxygen, was released in 2017.

=== Other work ===
==== Playback singing ====
List of songs recorded by Yuvan Shankar Raja

Besides scoring, Yuvan Shankar Raja is a noted playback singer as well. As of August 2011, he has sung over 80 songs, mostly his own compositions, and several times he recorded for his father Ilaiyaraaja and his brother Karthik Raja. He lent his voice first in 1988, when he was eight years old for a song in the film En Bommukutty Ammavukku, composed by his father. Since then, he frequently sang for his father in films such as Anjali (1990), Chatriyan (1990), Thalattu Ketkuthamma (1991), Friends (2001), Kaathal Jaathi (2002), Ramana (2003) and Neethane En Ponvasantham (2012). Under his brother's direction, he had sung in the films Naam Iruvar Namakku Iruvar (1998), Ullam Kollai Poguthae (2001) and Veyilodu Vilayadu (2012). He had also performed a song for the film Siddu +2 (2010), composed by his friend Dharan, and had lent his voice for the theme song for the World Classical Tamil Conference 2010, set to tune by A. R. Rahman. In 2013, he sang a song for Rahman in the film Maryan.

However, he is better known as a singer of his own compositions. Films, featuring some of his most popular songs as a singer, include Thulluvadho Ilamai, April Maadhathil, Pudhupettai, Pattiyal, Azhagai Irukkirai Bayamai Irukkirathu (in which he had sung all songs), Deepavali, Kattradhu Thamizh, Siva Manasula Sakthi, Sarvam, Paiyaa and Naan Mahaan Alla, the latter earning him a Filmfare nomination for the Best Male Playback Singer Award.

==== Concerts ====
In January 2009, Yuvan had announced his first live performance, which was planned to be held at the Rogers Centre in Toronto, Canada on 25 April 2009. According to Yuvan, the show would have featured around 30 songs, sung by well-known singers and his father Ilaiyaraaja, as well as some stage dances in between, by actresses Sana Khan and Meenakshi. However, the concert had been postponed eventually, with Yuvan Shankar stating that he was working on novel ideas to make the show memorable and hence, postponed the concert. In October 2009, he announced that a world tour, titled "Oru Naalil", is planned with a three-hour stage show to be held in various cities all over the world. The tour began with a show on 1 December 2009 at the Sharjah Cricket Association Stadium in Dubai, United Arab Emirates, featuring performances by singers such as Shankar Mahadevan, Hariharan, Karthik, Harish Raghavendra and Silambarasan and professional dancers from Mumbai, which was expected to be followed by shows in Canada, the US and South Africa. Also, it was planned to conduct the shows in Muscat, Oman and Kuwait, but following the Dubai concert, the tour was cancelled.

In October 2010, Yuvan Shankar Raja disclosed that he had signed for his first live concert in Chennai. The event, named Yuvan – Live in Concert, which was sponsored, organized and later telecasted on STAR Vijay, was held at the YMCA Grounds, Nandanam, Chennai, on 16 January 2011. Additionally, a promotional music video, "I'll Be There for You", composed and sung by Yuvan Shankar himself, directed by Vishnuvardhan and shot by Nirav Shah was made, while STAR Vijay aired a 3-week, 14 episode serial on Yuvan Shankar Raja as a run-up to the concert.

On 16 February 2012, Techofes organized a live-in tribute concert for Yuvan Shankar Raja, where he also performed.

He performed at the inaugural Kuala Lumpur International Indian Music Festival 2012 held at the Bukit Jalil Stadium, Kuala Lumpur, Malaysia on 15 December 2012. A pre-launch event to promote the concert was held in Brickfields, Kuala Lumpur in the first week of September, where Yuvan Shankar Raja sang a couple of songs.

== Music style and influence ==
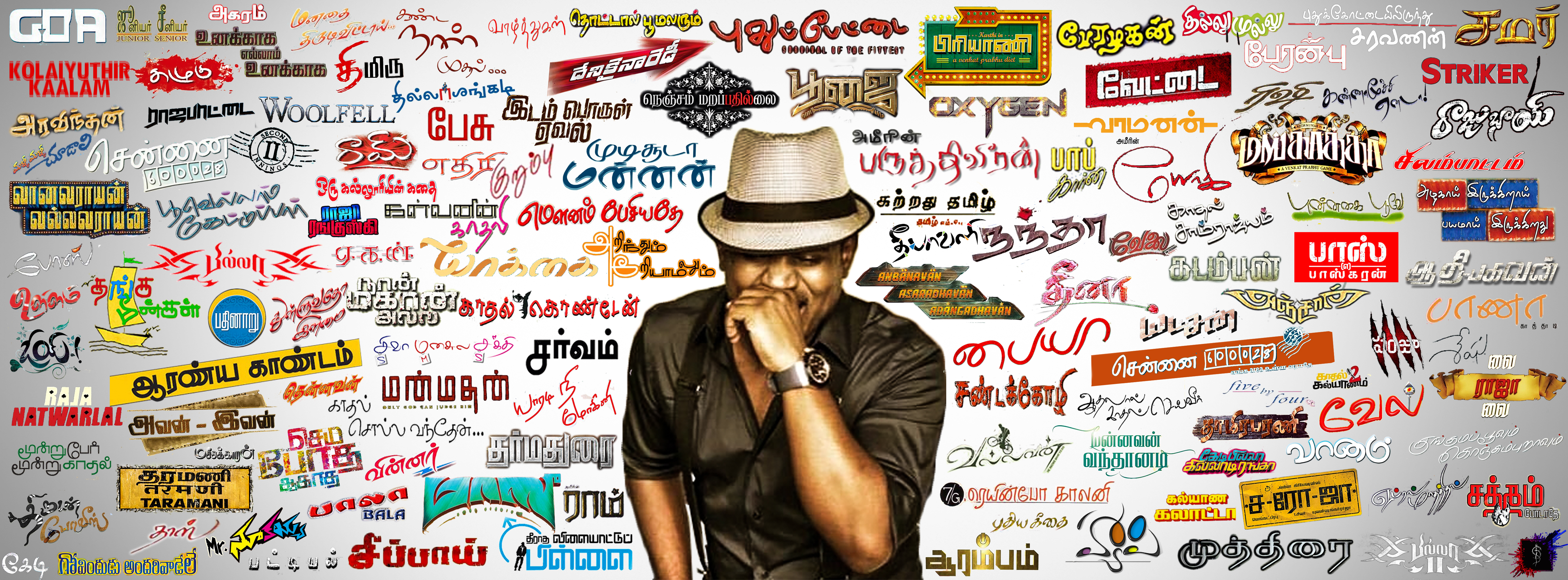
Poster of Yuvanism

He has explored various genres, and experimented with new sounds. Yuvan Shankar Raja has not learnt Indian classical music, although he has used complex swara patterns and carnatic rāgas in several films, including Nandhaa and Thulluvadho Ilamai. Critics have noted that Yuvan Shankar Raja's music has a "youthful character to it", with his compositions in particular appealing to the younger generation.

Yuvan Shankar Raja started the "era of remixes"; "Aasai Nooru Vagai" from Kurumbu (2004) is considered as the first remix in a Tamil film, following which several composers began remixing Tamil film songs from the 1970s and 80s. He has experimented with the fusion of old songs with his own original compositions, mixing and incorporating parts of them into his songs, e.g., "Theepidikka" from Arinthum Ariyamalum (2005) and "Enga Area" from Pudhupettai (2005). In 2010, he and his friend and fellow actor Silambarasan released the song "Evan Di Unna Pethan" from the film Vaanam (2011) as a single, which generated the trend of releasing single tracks from film soundtracks in Tamil cinema several months prior to the actual release, although the first single in Tamil cinema had been released in 2001 already.

== Frequent collaborations ==
Yuvan Shankar Raja has frequently collaborated with several Tamil film directors, including Selvaraghavan, Ameer, Vishnuvardhan, Venkat Prabhu, Ram, Lingusamy, Elan, Seenu Ramasamy and Thiagarajan Kumararaja.

He has also worked with a wide range of lyricists, including Vaali,Gangai Amaran, Palani Bharathi, Na. Muthukumar, Pa. Vijay, Snehan, Yugabharathi, and Madhan Karky. Additional collaborations include those with Vivek, Thamarai, and Kabilan. His association with Na. Muthukumar, in particular, has resulted in a number of notable songs and is considered one of his most consistent composer–lyricist partnerships.

Yuvan has composed music for several films frequent leading Tamil actors such as Ajith Kumar, Silambarasan, Suriya, Vishal, Karthi and Dhanush.

== Non-cinematic works ==
=== Music Albums ===
Aside from scoring film music and soundtracks, he also produces personal music albums from time to time. In 1999, he made the Tamil pop album "The Blast", which contained 12 tracks, featuring vocals by Kamal Haasan, P. Unnikrishnan, Nithyashree Mahadevan, and Yuvan. At a time when film music dominated the Indian industry, Yuvan's decision to create a standalone album was bold. Although it didn't gain mainstream success, it remains a crucial milestone in his career, reflecting his early interest in blending Western and Indian sounds.

=== Singles & Collaborations ===
In recent years, Yuvan has focused on independent singles, collaborating with a wide range of artists across genres. In 2021, he released "Top Tucker", a song composed by Yuvan Shankar Raja, featuring collaborations with several artists, including Badshah, Uchana Amit, and Jonita Gandhi, with lyrics penned by Badshah and Vignesh Shivan. The music video features Rashmika Mandanna alongside Badshah and others. The song received significant attention, garnering millions of views shortly after its release. It was praised for its catchy rhythm and the collaboration between artists from different parts of India. The same year, he ventured into spiritual music with "Tala Al Badru Alayna", featuring A. R. Ameen.

In 2021, Yuvan teamed up with Arivu to release a song titled "Don't Touch Me" through his U1 Records. The song was released as an awareness track on violence against women. It features the vocals of Yuvan and Yunohoo, with Arivu contributing to the lyrics. That year, "Candy" by Yuvan, featuring Dhvani Bhanushali, was released.

In 2022, he released "Iruthalai Kolli", a track from Naatpadu Theral, with lyrics written by Vairamuthu. That same year, he released "Unna Paathale", a one-minute track.

In 2024, "Money in the Bank", featuring international artists Bank Rolls Young and S Ghost, showcased his global aspirations. Another track from 2024, "She's a Killer", is unique in that Yuvan directed the music video and penned the lyrics himself.

=== Featured Songs ===
Apart from releasing lead singles, Yuvan has also been featured in multiple independent tracks. One of the most notable collaborations was with A.R. Rahman on "Semmozhiyaana Thamizh Mozhiyaam", Composed by A.R. Rahman for the 2010 World Classical Tamil Conference, the song featured Yuvan Shankar Raja as one of the lead singers among a diverse group of artists.

He also lent his vocals to "Vandhanam" from Karthik Raja’s devotional album Andal, which is where Yuvan sang his very first Carnatic classical song.

In 2019, he collaborated with Dharan Kumar on "Rasaathi Nenja". In 2020, Yuvan Shankar Raja contributed to the song "Arivum Anbum" by lending his voice.

=== Promotional Tracks ===
He has also composed multiple promotional singles. His 2011 track "I'll Be There for You" was created exclusively for his Yuvan – Live in Concert, with lyrics by Na. Muthukumar, serving as an anthem for his fans. Muthukumar stated that the lyrics were meant to reflect the love and bond between Yuvan and his fans. Though it was not officially released for years, the song was widely requested by fans. In 2025, it was finally released as part of the film Sweetheart!.

In 2021, he composed "Vendru Va Veeraragale", a tribute song for Tamil Nadu athletes competing in the Tokyo Olympics. This composition was backed by the Sports Development Authority of Tamil Nadu (SDAT) and Government of Tamil Nadu.

In 2023, "High on Yuvan" was released as a promotional track for his European live tour.

In 2024, Yuvan composed and sang the theme song for the Chennai Formula 4 Racing event. The song was produced for the Tamil Nadu government-backed event at the Chennai Formula Racing Circuit, with lyrics penned by Arunraja Kamaraj.

=== Ad singles ===
Yuvan composed his first jingle for the Meenakshi Labs, a division of Meenakshi Mission Hospital and Research Centre in Madurai. Speaking about this, he said, "I have done it for a good cause, for the importance given to health".

=== Unreleased Works ===
In 2008, he started working on his second album, the rights of which had been acquired by Sony BMG. Reportedly a bilingual album, produced in both Tamil and Hindi, the album was never released.

In 2010, he joined hands with former President of India A. P. J. Abdul Kalam for a grand music video album titled "Song of Youth". The popular song of the same title, on which the album is based, was written by Kalam and set to tunes by Yuvan Shankar Raja, who, along with Kalam and many other celebrities from the field of sports and entertainment, was set to feature in the video as well. The album was made as a trilingual, produced in Tamil, Hindi, and English, but remains unreleased.

== Filmography ==
=== As film producer ===
Year	Film	Notes
2018	Pyaar Prema Kaadhal	
2022	Maamanithan	
2024	Pon Ondru Kanden	Co-produced with Jio Studios
2025	Sweetheart!	

=== Music video ===
Year	Title	Other credited performer(s)	Director	Ref.
2011	"I'll Be There For You"	None	Vishnuvardhan	
2021	"Top Tucker"	Badshah, Uchana Amit, Rashmika Mandanna	Amarpreet GS Chhabra	
2022	"Candy"	Dhvani Bhanushali	Amith Krishnan	
2022	"Unna Paathale"	None	None	
2024	"Money in the Bank"	Bank Rolls Young, S Ghost	Abhishek Ranganathan	
2024	"She's a killer"	Dushara Vijayan	Yuvan Shankar Raja	

=== Film ===
Year	Film	Song	Notes
2003	Punnagai Poove	"En Kadhal"	
2008	Saroja	"Cheeky Cheeky"	
2012	Billa II	"Gangster"	
2017	Gowdru Hotel	"Kshanavu"	
2022	Coffee with Kadhal	"Rum Bum Bum"	
2023	Paramporul	"Sippara Rippara"	
2025	Sweetheart!	"I'll Be There For You"	

== Personal life ==
Yuvan Shankar Raja married his girlfriend Sujaya Chandran on 21 March 2005, at the Mayor Sri Ramanathan Chettiyar Hall in Chennai, India. Yuvan had met her in 2002 as a fan at a music cultural program in London and both fell in love later. Sujaya was a London-based singer and the daughter of Dr. C. R. Velayutham and Dr. Sarojini Chandran. They had a secret registered marriage in September 2003 in London, before the formal public wedding was held in 2005 with the consent of their parents. In August 2007, they filed for divorce with mutual consent, which was granted in February 2008, after 6 months. The reason for the divorce was cited to be "irreconcilable differences".

On 1 September 2011, he married Shilpa at the Tirumala Venkateswara Temple, Tirupati in Andhra Pradesh. The marriage was held in a simple ceremony with only family members and close friends being present. Shilpa was revealed to be a B.Pharm graduate from Australia. The wedding reception was arranged a day later in Chennai. Later they divorced.

In 2014, Yuvan Shankar Raja announced that he had converted to Islam. He legally changed his name to Abdul Haliq, but continues to use his original name professionally. On 1 January 2015, he got married for the third time to Zafroon Nizar. They had a baby girl on 7 April 2016.

== Bibliography ==
- Reel world: an anthropology of creation. Durham: Duke University press. 2015. doi:10.2307/j.ctv125jg0b.17. ISBN 978-0-8223-7516-6.
- Weidman, Amanda (2021). "The Raw and the Husky: On Timbral Qualia and Ethnolinguistic Belonging". Brought to Life by the Voice (1 ed.). University of California Press. pp. 131–157. ISBN 978-0-520-37706-6. JSTOR j.ctv2rb75cn.11. Archived from the original on 24 June 2023.
- Pandian, Anand (November 2012). "The Time of Anthropology: Notes from a Field of Contemporary Experience". Cultural Anthropology. 27 (4): 547–571. doi:10.1111/j.1548-1360.2012.01161.x. hdl:10524/31844. JSTOR 23360316. Archived from the original on 24 June 2023.
