= Aadavari Matalaku Arthale Verule =

- Theatrical release poster
- Directed by: Selvaraghavan
- Written by: Selvaraghavan
- Dialogue by: Ramesh–Gopi
- Produced by: N. V. Prasad; S. Naga Ashok Kumar
- Starring: Venkatesh; Trisha
- Cinematography: B. Balamurugan
- Edited by: Kola Bhaskar
- Music by: Yuvan Shankar Raja
- Production company: Sri Sai Deva Productions
- Release date: 27 April 2007
- Running time: 167 minutes
- Country: India
- Language: Telugu
- Box office: est. ₹30 crore

Aadavari Matalaku Arthale Verule (transl. The words of women have different meanings) is a 2007 Indian Telugu-language romantic drama film written and directed by Selvaraghavan (credited as Sri Raghava). The film stars Venkatesh and Trisha while Sriram, Kota Srinivasa Rao, K. Viswanath, and Sunil play supporting roles. The music was composed by Yuvan Shankar Raja. The film's title is based on a song from Missamma (1955), which is partially featured in this film.

The film was released theatrically on 27 April 2007 and became a critical and commercial success. It won three Nandi Awards and one Filmfare Award. Following its success, the film was remade in Tamil as Yaaradi Nee Mohini (2008; starring Selvaraghavan's brother Dhanush), Kannada as Anthu Inthu Preethi Banthu (2008), Odia as Prema Adhei Akhyara (2010), Bengali as 100% Love (2012) and Bhojpuri as Mehandi Laga Ke Rakhna (2017).

== Plot ==
Ganesh is from a middle-class family. He makes several bids to obtain employment, but all go in vain due to his poor language skills and inadequate educational qualifications. All his friends settled in life, but he continues to struggle to find employment. Ganesh has two best friends, Vasu and Srinu. His father is a teacher and is always critical of him for being an irresponsible person, only adding to his already long list of woes.

At this juncture, Ganesh catches a glimpse of Keerthi and immediately falls in love with her. He learns that she works for a software solutions firm. Luckily, Ganesh eventually secured employment in the same firm. Keerthi, however, turns out to be short-tempered. On a business trip, Ganesh accompanies her along with other colleagues to Australia. There, he reveals his feelings of love to her. She declines, saying that she comes from an orthodox family, and her marriage has already been arranged with her cousin.

Ganesh returns to India in a depressed manner. Unable to see his son in depression, his father tries to convince Keerthi, but she insults him for recommending his son's love and accidentally slaps both Ganesh and his father. Later that night, Ganesh's father dies of a heart attack. Ganesh again goes into depression. To ease Ganesh's mood, Vasu persuades him to come along to his family's house in the countryside. Coincidentally, on the train journey, Keerthi is revealed to be Vasu's fiancée. However, their grandfather's intention of getting them married earlier is put aside because Vasu and Keerthi leave the house to make their own identity. This causes heartache to their grandfather.

With the passing of a few days, the parents of Keerthi and Vasu decide to marry to appease their grandfather. After several turns of events, Keerthi realizes that she is in love with Ganesh instead. Ganesh asks her to forget him, during a late-night meeting, because he believes that it would create problems in their happy family. Keerthi's grandfather notices them conversing and admonishes Keerthi for bringing disrepute to their family and asks Ganesh to leave his village. Ganesh gets ready to leave when he sees everyone putting up decorations for the wedding. Vasu furiously asks him to get out but Ganesh responds that they have misunderstood Keerthi all along. While Ganesh is on his way, a bunch of goons he saved the family from stabbed him in the stomach, and he is hospitalized.

However, Vasu and Keerthi's wedding is taking place that morning. Upon knowing Ganesh's condition, Srinu asks Vasu to come and help. Though initially reluctant, Vasu abandons his wedding to help Ganesh. Everyone else slowly leaves for the hospital, except Keerthi and her grandfather. Keerthi says that she would never disobey her grandfather. Afterward, her grandfather takes Keerthi to the hospital. While Ganesh recovers and wakes up to leave, he sees that everyone in the family is outside his room, including Keerthi and her grandfather.

In time, Keerthi's family comes to stay with Ganesh for a few days. The film ends when Ganesh and Keerthi become a couple and live together.

== Cast ==
- Venkatesh as Ganesh
- Trisha as Keerti aka Kusumamba
- Sriram as Vasu
- K. Viswanath as Keerti's grandfather
- Kota Srinivasa Rao as Ganesh's father
- Sunil as Srinu
- Swati Reddy as Pooja aka Prasunaamba
- Jeeva as Balu
- Vinaya Prasad as Janaki
- Suman Setty as Servant Mangayya
- Hari Teja as Keerti's cousin
- Kishori Ballal as Sharadamba (Vasu's grandmother)
- Rajyalakshmi as Lakshmi
- Prasad Babu as Lakshmi's husband
- Shankar Melkote as Company Head
- G. V. Sudhakar Naidu as Rowdy
- Ananth Babu as Vasu's relative
- Jaya Lakshmi
- Ramya Chowdary
- Rajshri Reddy
- Devi Sri
- Jaya Lakshmi
- Sri Lalitha
- Padma Reddy
- Junior Relangi
- Meghna Naidu (Special appearance in the song "Cheli Chemaku")
- Mumaith Khan (Special appearance in the song "Oh Baby")

== Production ==
Selvaraghavan (under the name of Sri Raghava) directed his maiden Telugu venture which he had committed to make since 2003 with Venkatesh in the leading role. He wrote the script, taking experiences from life experiences of friends who were unemployed graduates, like the film's main character. Jyothika was considered as a lead opposite Venkatesh, but she opted out of the contract due to her wedding arrangements. She was later replaced by Trisha.

== Soundtrack ==
Aadavari Matalaku Arthale Verule

Soundtrack album by Yuvan Shankar Raja
- Released: 28 March 2007 (India)
- Recorded: 2006–2007
- Genre: Feature film soundtrack
- Length: 31:02
- Label: Aditya Music
- Producer: Yuvan Shankar Raja

Yuvan Shankar Raja chronology
Chennai 600028 (2008)	Aadavari Matalaku Arthale Verule (2007)	Raju Bhai (2008)

The music was composed by director Sri Raghava's friend and "frequent" composer Yuvan Shankar Raja, teaming up again after producing successful Tamil albums such as Kaadhal Kondein (2003), 7G Rainbow Colony (2004) and Pudhupettai (2006). This film remains their last collaboration (even though they later rejoined in 2021 for Nenjam Marappathillai) before they split up, before NGK (2019), and Sri Raghava decided to work with G. V. Prakash Kumar. The soundtrack was released on 28 March 2007 at Rama Naidu studios. It features 6 tracks overall with lyrics by Kulasekhar, Kandikonda, Sirivennela Sitaramasastri and Chandrabose.

Upon the film's release, the music received positive reviews, being praised as "extraordinary", winning composer Yuvan Shankar Raja much accolades and a nomination at the 2008 Filmfare Awards South for Best Music in Telugu.

No.	Title	Lyrics	Singer(s)	Length
1.	"Naa Manasuki"	Chandrabose	Karthik, Gayatri Narayanan(Godavari fame)	5:42
2.	"Allanta Doorala"	Sirivennela Sitaramasastri	S. P. Balasubrahmanyam	4:35
3.	"O Baby"	Chandrabose	Benny Dayal, Haricharan, Matangi, Bhargavi Pillai	5:39
4.	"Yemaindi Ee Vela"	Kulasekhar	Udit Narayan	5:23
5.	"Cheli Chamaku"	Kandikonda	Adnan Sami, Anushka Manchanda, Swetha Mohan	5:12
6.	"Manasa Manichamma"	Sirivennela Sitaramasastri	Karthik	4:32
Total length:				31:02

== Release and reception ==
The film is released on 27 April 2007. The film was released on 272 screens, including 15 in Karnataka, 8 in Orissa and 21 overseas.

A critic from Rediff.com called the film "a good entertainer". Jeevi of Idlebrain.com rated the film 3 1/2 out of 5 and wrote that "Venkatesh’s ultimate comedy, Trisha, Selva Raghavan’s genuine moments and dialogues are the main positive aspects of this film". The film collected ₹30 crore at the box office. It completed a 50-day run in 200 centres and a 100-day run in 21 centres.

== Awards ==
Filmfare Awards South

- Best Actress – Trisha
- Nominated: Best Actor – Venkatesh
- Nominated: Best Music Director – Yuvan Shankar Raja

Nandi Awards

- Best Popular Feature Film – N.V. Prasad, Shanam Naga Ashok Kumar
- Best Actor – Venkatesh
- Best Dialogue Writer – Ramesh-Gopi

CineMAA Awards

- Best Actor – Female – Trisha

Santosham Film Awards

- Best Actor – Venkatesh
- Best Character Artist – Kota Srinivasa Rao
- Best Makeup – Raghava

== Remakes ==
Aadavari Matalaku Arthale Verule was remade in Tamil as Yaaradi Nee Mohini (2008), in Kannada as Anthu Inthu Preethi Banthu (2008), in Odia as Prema Adhei Akhyara (2010), in Bengali as 100% Love (2013) and in Bhojpuri as Mehandi Laga Ke Rakhna (2017).
