= Maalai Naerathu Mayakkam =

2016 Indian film by Gitanjali Selvaraghavan

- Theatrical release poster
- Directed by: Gitanjali Selvaraghavan
- Written by: Selvaraghavan
- Produced by: Kola Bhaskar
- Starring: Balakrishna Kola; Wamiqa Gabbi
- Cinematography: Sridhar
- Edited by: Rukesh
- Music by: Amrit
- Production company: Beeptone Studios
- Release date: 1 January 2016
- Running time: 123 minutes
- Country: India
- Language: Tamil

Maalai Nerathu Mayakkam (transl. Evening Trance) is a 2016 Indian Tamil-language romantic drama film directed by Gitanjali Selvaraghavan and written by her husband Selvaraghavan. Starring newcomers Balakrishna Kola and Wamiqa Gabbi, the film is produced by Kola Bhaskar and has music composed by Amrit. Having had several false starts since 2006, the film was released on 1 January 2016 to positive reviews. It was dubbed and released in Telugu as Nannu Vadili Neevu Polevule.

== Plot ==
The film opens with Manoja suffering from insomnia. Her ex-boyfriend Tarun tries to propose to her after wishing her on her birthday. She genuinely refuses his proposal. She moves to her room and looks at her photo gallery, where she sees the birthday celebration pictures when she had celebrated with her husband Prabhu.

The plot moves a few years prior, where Manoja was refused by her boyfriend Tarun. Her reason for rejecting the relationship is that she has not dated him close enough and his thoughts are primarily about sex. Later, he reveals that he is moving away from her and has a crush on Reshma.

On the other side, Prabhu is socially inept and lives with his parents. He lacks charm and confidence, thereby getting rejected by many girls while on dates. His parents were trying to get him married, but because of his lazy appearance, he gets rejected. Manoja's mother, who is suffering from cancer, compels Manoja, and she agrees to get married.

After Prabhu and Manoja get married, Prabhu tries to impress Manoja but fails as she is not interested in him. One day, Prabhu takes Manoja to a restaurant, where he meets Tarun, causing him to suspect Manoja of having a sexual relationship with Tarun, and he argues with her. After he realises Manoja's disciplined character, he apologises. Manoja also apologises, and they both start dating as friends.

After three years, when Prabhu and Manoja are about to celebrate their second wedding anniversary, Prabhu invites his friends to their celebration. His friends refuse to come and give him an idea to trick Manoja into bed with him. Prabhu tries this out and gets her drunk. He tries to seduce her when dancing, but when this fails and Manoja refuses, Prabhu gets frustrated and forcibly rapes her. After the ordeal, Manoja attempts suicide by slashing her wrist multiple times. The now sober Prabhu admits her to a hospital.

After the recovery, Manoja applies for a divorce, and they start living separately, but Prabhu is still in love with Manoja. Now, the plot moves to the present, where four years have passed. Prabhu meets Manoja again. She calls Tarun again and requests him to propose to her. Tarun wants to have sex first, so he takes Manoja to Munnar. Prabhu and his Facebook friend Kamini also move to the same place, where he tries to confess his love to Manoja.

Manoja refuses to have sex with Tarun and gets thrown out. Prabhu tries to convince her of his love, to which Manoja replies that she too loves Prabhu but hates him because he raped her. Prabhu gives a knife to Manoja, asking her to kill him, to which Manoja refuses. At last, Prabhu rips himself with the knife, hoping to satisfy Manoja. Manoja starts crying, thinking Prabhu is dead, but she hears his heartbeat and takes him to the hospital, where Prabhu then recovers. Manoja and Prabhu start living together happily. The film ends with the tagline "A true love is made up in heaven".

In a post-credits scene, Manoja cooks food for Prabhu. Although the food tastes bad, Prabhu asks Manoja to bring some more. After Manoja moves to the kitchen, Prabhu laments to the audience about how he can eat such bad food all his life.

== Cast ==
- Balakrishna Kola as Prabhu
- Wamiqa Gabbi as Manoja
- Azhagam Perumal as Prabhu's father
- Kalyani Natarajan as Manoja's mother
- Sharran Kumar as Tarun
- Naveen George Thomas as Prabhu's friend
- Gokul Anand as Manas
- Parvathy Nair as Kamini (guest appearance)
- Ajay Rathnam as the judge (guest appearance)

== Production ==
After the release of Pudhupettai (2006), director Selvaraghavan set up a production company, White Elephants, along with Yuvan Shankar Raja and Arvind Krishna. He announced the team's first project, Idhu Maalai Nerathu Mayakkam, which began filming in November 2006. The team shot scenes with Karthi, whose debut film, Paruthiveeran, was awaiting release, and Sandhya. The film was stalled, in early 2007, due to Arvind Krishna's decision to leave White Elephants. As a result, the project was eventually shelved.

Midway through the production of Aayirathil Oruvan, Selvaraghavan relaunched Idhu Maalai Nerathu Mayakkam in November 2008 and filming started with a new cast of Dhanush and Andrea Jeremiah in the leading roles. Ramji and G. V. Prakash Kumar had taken over as the cinematographer and music director respectively. The film was described to be a "quick project" with Selvaraghavan and Dhanush's sister, Vimalageetha taking up the production reins. However, filming was subsequently stalled for unknown reasons. In August 2009, the film was launched again for the third time with a first schedule planned in Hyderabad and Selvaraghavan taking over exclusively as producer. However the film was yet again abandoned in October 2009, and he began work on another project Maruvan (later titled Irandam Ulagam) with the lead actors instead.

The film was relaunched in mid-2014 under the truncated title Maalai Nerathu Mayakkam, with Selvaraghavan's wife Gitanjali announced as the new director. Production began in August 2014 with newcomers Balakrishna Kola and Wamiqa Gabbi, while the film was announced to be produced by Balakrishna's father, editor Kola Bhaskar. Further newcomers Amrit and Sridhar were signed on as the film's music composer and cinematographer respectively. The film's first look poster was released in April 2015. Parvathy Nair shot for a small role in the film during late 2015, featuring in the title song and a few scenes. She revealed that the team were looking for a more established actress, but her immediate availability prompted the team to sign her for the role.

== Soundtrack ==
Debutant Amrit composed the songs and wrote the lyric of the songs alongside Vivek. Think Music released the album on 8 October 2015.

Track listing
No.	Title	Lyrics	Singer(s)	Length
1.	"Sarakka"	Amrit, Vivek	Amrit	05:11
2.	"Mora Saiyya (Yeno Mounam)"	Amrit, Vivek	Vijay Prakash, Shakthisree Gopalan	05:00
3.	"Mokka Piece"	Amrit, Vivek	Benny Dayal	04:42
4.	"Maalai Nerathu Mayakkam"	Amrit	Amrit	04:42
5.	"Ennodu"	Amrit, Vivek	Mili Nair, Amrit	04:19
6.	"Two Opposites" (Theme Music)	NA	Instrumental	02:41
7.	"The Return of Love" (Theme Music)		Instrumental	00:58
8.	"Mokka Piece" (Karaoke Version)			04:42
9.	"Sarakka" (Karaoke Version)			05:11
10.	"Maalai Nerathu Mayakkam"			04:42
Total length:				26:13

== Critical reception ==
Writing for The Hindu, Sudhir Srinivasan said "Gitanjali opens the film with a line that goes, "It's difficult to explain some love stories. Well, perhaps if they were really love stories, they could be explained." S Saraswathi of Rediff.com rated the film 2.5 out of 5 and wrote "Maalai Nerathu Mayakkam is a far cry from your regular love stories and their phony over-top-characters, yet as you leave the theater, you feel strangely untouched by the director’s attempt at an emotional assault".
