= T. Santhanam =

Indian film art director (c. 1972 – 2022)

- Born: c. 1972
- Died: 24 October 2022; Chennai, India
- Occupations: Art director and production designer
- Years active: 2010–2022

T. Santhanam (c. 1972 – 24 October 2022) was an Indian film art director who worked in the Tamil film industry.

== Career ==
Santhanam graduated from the Government College of Fine Arts in 1996, and assisted art director M. Prabhaharan for five years. He started doing ad films, and then got his break in films with the K Bhagyaraj directorial, Chokka Thangam (2003).

Santhanam garnered acclaim for his work on Selvaraghavan's fantasy film Aayirathil Oruvan (2010), where he depicted various periods, including the Chola dynasty and contemporary times. Santhanam also worked on Vasanthabalan's period drama Kaaviya Thalaivan (2014), set in the 1930s. For both films, he won the Tamil Nadu State Film Award for Best Art Director.

He later notably collaborated with AR Murugadoss on the Vijay-starrer Sarkar (2018) and the Rajinikanth-starrer Darbar (2020), as well as with Karthik Subbaraj on the gangster dramas Jagame Thandhiram (2021) and Mahaan (2022).

== Death ==
Santhanam died on 24 October 2022 of a heart attack, in his early 50s.

== Partial filmography ==
=== As art director ===
- Chokka Thangam (2003)
- Pudhukottaiyilirundhu Saravanan (2004)
- Bose (2004)
- Pudhupettai (2006)
- Yaaradi Nee Mohini (2008)
- Aayirathil Oruvan (2010)
- Tamizh Padam (2010)
- Kalavani (2010)
- Thoonga Nagaram (2011)
- Deiva Thirumagal (2011)
- Kaaviya Thalaivan (2014)
- Demonte Colony (2015)
- Irudhi Suttru (2016)
- Saala Khadoos (2016)
- Sarkar (2018)
- Darbar (2020)
- Jagame Thandhiram (2021)
- Mahaan (2022)
- August 16, 1947 (2023)
