= Naane Varuvean =

2022 film directed by Selvaraghavan

- Theatrical release poster
- Directed by: Selvaraghavan
- Written by: Dhanush
- Produced by: Kalaipuli S. Thanu
- Starring: Dhanush; Indhuja Ravichandran; Elli AvrRam
- Cinematography: Om Prakash
- Edited by: Bhuvan Srinivasan
- Music by: Yuvan Shankar Raja
- Production company: V Creations
- Distributed by: Ayngaran International
- Release date: 29 September 2022
- Running time: 122 minutes
- Country: India
- Language: Tamil

Naane Varuvean (transl. I will come myself) is a 2022 Indian Tamil-language horror thriller film directed by Selvaraghavan and produced by Kalaipuli S. Thanu under V Creations. The film stars Dhanush in dual roles as the hero and villain, alongside Indhuja Ravichandran, Elli AvrRam, Prabhu, and Yogi Babu, while Selvaraghavan makes a cameo appearance.

The film was officially announced in December 2020 under the tentative title D44, as it is Dhanush's 44th film as the lead actor, while the official title was announced a few days later. Principal photography commenced in October 2021. It was predominantly shot in Ooty, and wrapped by mid-April 2022. The film has music composed by Yuvan Shankar Raja, cinematography handled by Om Prakash and editing by Bhuvan Srinivasan.

Naane Varuvean was released theatrically on 29 September 2022, and received mixed reviews from critics with praise for Dhanush’s performance, technical aspects and Yuvan’s music.

== Plot ==
Prabhu and Kathir are identical twins. While Prabhu is innocent, Kathir has always been a troublemaker. When Kathir beats up the neighbor kid, their father ties Kathir up in the backyard to a tree. Kathir goes missing overnight, apparently kidnapped by an unnamed psychotic person. Kathir kills the psycho and returns home, where he continues his erratic behavior. Kathir locks Prabhu inside a wooden box and kills his father. Kathir's mother does not turn him in to the cops but instead seeks the help of a local saint. The saint tells her that the twins cannot coexist and have to be separated to save one of them. Frustrated, their mother abandons Kathir in a temple and flees with Prabhu.

Years later, Prabhu is a well-settled family man with a loving wife, Bhuvana, and a daughter, Sathya. At the age of 12, Sathya starts developing symptoms of schizophrenia. She starts talking to some unknown person and often loses sleep. After repeatedly hearing his daughter talk to herself in the middle of the night, Prabhu plants a baby monitor in her room. She breaks the monitor and throws it out of the room, revealing that the unknown person asked her to break the monitor, or else he will kill Prabhu. Worried by the recent happenings, Prabhu takes his daughter to a psychiatrist. Sathya reveals that the unknown person is Sonu, a small boy who often talks to her.

Despite Prabhu and the psychiatrist rejecting Sathya's claim that Sonu exists, Sathya is adamant that Sonu is real. Based on his own research, Prabhu hires a group of young ghostbusters, whom he came across on YouTube. The technical team plants technical equipment to monitor the paranormal activity in Sathya's room. In the middle of the night, the team finds footprints. The door is locked, and they start hearing Sathya's voice again. Terrified and fearing for Sathya's life, Prabhu tries to open the door, but it unlocks itself, and Sathya begins to talk in Marathi. The crew helps Prabhu understand and translate Sathya's communication. Possessed by Sonu's voice, Sathya reveals that Prabhu has to deal with Kathir and put an end to his atrocities that caused Sonu's death.

The psychiatrist suggests that Prabhu fulfill Sonu's spirit's requests. It is revealed that Kathir, who was abandoned by his mother and Prabhu, struggled to find a livelihood, and people abused him. Unable to control his thirst for killing, Kathir ended up killing them. Eventually, Kathir found the love of his life, Madhuri, a mute woman. They get married and settle in a remote cabin in the forest with twins Sonu and Manu. One day, Sonu hid in his father's jeep and followed him to document his father's hunt. He instead witnesses his father killing a bunch of tourists.

Kathir explains to Sonu that he will not be able to understand and asks him to hide this from the rest of the family. Eventually, Sonu told Madhuri and Manu about Kathir's true nature. In fear of losing his family again, Kathir locked up the twins and Madhuri. Despite her pleadings that she will not report to the cops, he refused to leave her and the twins. In the ensuing argument, Kathir ended up accidentally killing Madhuri. Sonu was also accidentally killed in the altercation.

Prabhu, Sathya, the psychiatrist, and Prabhu's friend Guna travel to Chopda, a North Indian hill town backed by huge acres of lush green forests. Sathya's mental health eventually starts deteriorating. Prabhu takes Sathya to Sonu's school. Upon finding Manu, she tries to talk with him, but runs away in fear. She speaks Marathi and signals in sign language, gaining Manu's trust. Sathya promises to save Manu from Kathir with his uncle Prabhu's help. Manu asks Sathya and the others to meet him at his home later that night and cautions them to be careful.

Prabhu and Kathir eventually meet up after a long time, where Prabhu confesses that he knows about Kathir's urge to kill, pleads with him to leave Manu, and tells him that he will not report anything to the authorities. Kathir vehemently refuses, and a desperate Prabhu fights him. Possessed by Sonu, Sathya exhibits her archery skills and hurts Kathir to stop him from killing Prabhu. Manu threatens Kathir that he will jump down the cliff if Kathir does not stop. Prabhu tackles Kathir off the cliff with him, to their death. Sonu leaves Sathya as a result. Prabhu comes back, climbing the cliff top. He claims that everything has been sorted out and that Kathir is dead. However, Manu asks Prabhu to feel Kathir's existence, using twin telepathy, to confirm whether he is dead or not, by closing his eyes.

It is not revealed whether Kathir is dead, alive, or has possessed Prabhu. When Prabhu suddenly opens his eyes, the screen cuts to black.

== Cast ==
- Dhanush in a dual role as
  - Prabhu, the main protagonist
    - Sylvensten as young Prabhu
  - Kathir, the main antagonist
    - Frankinsten as young Kathir
- Indhuja Ravichandran as Bhuvana, Prabhu's wife
- Elli AvrRam as Madhuri, Kathir's wife
- Hiya Davey as Sathya, Prabhu's daughter
- Prabhav as Sonu
- Pranav as Manu
- Prabhu as the psychiatrist
- Yogi Babu as Guna, Prabhu's colleague
- Aajeedh Khalique as the Paranormal investigator
- Shelly Kishore as Janaki, Kathir's and Prabhu's mother
- Saravana Subbiah as Kathir's and Prabhu's father
- Thulasi as Bhuvana's mother
- Aroul D. Shankar as ACP Marudhu
- VTV Ganesh as Raghavan
- Selvaraghavan as the unnamed serial killer (cameo appearance)

== Production ==
=== Development ===
Kalaipuli S. Thanu announced a project with Dhanush with the tentative title D44. On 14 January 2021, the film's title was announced to be Naane Varuven. Thanu was revealed to be producing the film under the banner V Creations, while Selvaraghavan was announced to be directing the film marking his 5th collaboration with Dhanush after Thulluvadho Ilamai, Kaadhal Kondein, Pudhupettai and Mayakkam Enna and Yuvan Shankar Raja was announced as the music composer. It was reported that Dhanush himself wrote the story of the film.

Om Prakash and Prasanna GK were announced to be cinematographer and editor of the film respectively marking former's sixth collaboration with Dhanush after Anegan, Maari, Maari 2, Pattas, and Thiruchitrambalam, while marking the latter's sixth collaboration with Dhanush after Maari, Pa. Pandi, Velaiilla Pattadhari 2, Maari 2, and Maaran. However, he was replaced by Bhuvan Srinivasan.

=== Casting and filming ===
Dhanush plays dual roles in this film, doing so for the third time after Kodi and Pattas. For his role, the actor had undergone archery training. It was reported that there will be two female leads in the film. Indhuja Ravichandran was cast in as one of the female lead opposite Dhanush. Selvaraghavan, in addition to directing, is also likely to play a crucial role in this film. Comedian Yogi Babu is also playing a key role in this film, collaborating with Dhanush for the second time after Karnan. Veteran actor Prabhu is also added to the cast of the film and he will also be playing an important role in the film.

Principal photography began on 16 October 2021. On 16 February 2022, the next schedule of the shoot started in Ooty. On 11 April 2022 it was revealed that Dhanush had wrapped up shooting for the film. Post production works began in April 2022. Dhanush and Selvaraghavan completed dubbing for their portions.

== Music ==
Naane Varuvean

Soundtrack album by Yuvan Shankar Raja
- Released: 17 August 2022
- Recorded: 2021–2022
- Genre: Feature film soundtrack
- Length: 11:52
- Language: Tamil
- Label: Saregama India Limited
- Producer: Yuvan Shankar Raja

Yuvan Shankar Raja chronology
Viruman (2022)	Naane Varuvean (2022)	Love Today (2022)
External audio
- Audio Jukebox on YouTube

The film's soundtrack and background score is composed by Yuvan Shankar Raja collaborating with Dhanush for the seventh time, followed by Maari 2, Yaaradi Nee Mohini, Pudhupettai, Kaadhal Kondein, Pudhukottaiyilirundhu Saravanan and Thulluvadho Ilamai. The film album consist of 4 songs. Selvaraghavan and Dhanush each wrote the lyrics for two of the songs while Yugabharathi wrote the lyrics for rest of the songs.

Track listing
No.	Title	Lyrics	Singer(s)	Length
1.	"Veera Soora"	Selvaraghavan	Yuvan Shankar Raja, Muthu Sirpi	3:26
2.	"Rendu Raaja"	Dhanush	Dhanush, Yuvan Shankar Raja	3:23
3.	"Pinju Pinju Mazhai"	Yugabharathi	Sid Sriram	5:27
4.	"Yaarum Illa"	Vivek	Anthony Daasan	3:24
Total length:				15:40

== Release ==
=== Theatrical ===
Naane Varuvean was released worldwide in theaters on 29 September 2022 a day prior to the release of Ponniyin Selvan: I. The film was released in the UK and Europe by Ahimsa Entertainment.

=== Home media ===
The satellite rights of the film were sold to Sun TV, while the digital streaming rights were acquired by Amazon Prime Video. The film began digitally streaming on Amazon Prime Video from 27 October 2022. The film premiered on Sun TV on 25 December 2022 on the occasion of Christmas.

== Reception ==
=== Critical response ===
Naane Varuvean received mixed reviews from critics. On the review aggregator website Rotten Tomatoes, 40% of 5 critics' reviews are positive, with an average rating of 5.5/10.

Firstpost rated the film 3 out of 5 stars and wrote "Selvaraghavan and Dhanush and back together after a decade and this time, they choose yet another dark theme. With a short runtime and clean screenplay, Naane Varuven's exploration of psychopath is intriguing". Krishna Selvaseelan of Tamil Guardian rated the film 3 out of 5 stars, writing, “‘Naane Varuvean’ is not Selvaraghavan's strongest output, but even his weakest work is much more interesting than the majority of Tamil cinema.” Janani K of India Today rated the film 2.5 out of 5 stars and wrote "Naane Varuven sees Dhanush exploring the psychological horror genre. Sadly, it is a missed opportunity because of its sluggish second half". Kirubhakar Purushothaman of The Indian Express rated the film 1.5 out of 5 stars and wrote "Dhanush and his director brother Selvaraghavan, known for hits Kadhal Kondein and Mayakkam Enna, have joined hands after about a decade to make a film that is weakest of all their collaborations". Soundarya Athimuthu of The Quint rated the film 2.5 out of 5 and wrote "Naane Varuvean still falls slightly short of excellence with a predictable and flat drama, especially in the second half." M Suganth of The Times of India rated the film 2.5 out of 5 and wrote "We get an underwhelming climax that is left open-ended just so there is room for a sequel." Haricharan Pudipeddi of Hindustan Times wrote "Yuvan Shankar Raja's score plays a key role in amplifying the mood of the film." Sudhir Srinivasan of Cinema Express rated the film 2.5 out of 5 stars and wrote "This film speaks of good and bad, light and darkness, god and devil." Vijaya Shankar of DT Next rated the film 2 out of 5 and wrote "On the whole, Naane Varuvean has interesting ideas and the set-up for an intriguing horror was so well done in the first half, but soon falls short of what it promised and loses its charm due to its underwhelming second half." Dinamalar rated the film 3 out of 5 stars.

=== Box office ===
On the first day of its release, the film collected ₹7.30 crores in India.
