= Kola Bhaskar =

Indian film editor (died 2020)

- Born: Chittoor, Andhra Pradesh, India
- Died: 4 November 2020
- Occupation: Film editor
- Children: 1

Kola Bhaskar (died 4 November 2020) was an Indian film editor who worked in Tamil and Telugu films. He was known for his collaborations with filmmaker Selvaraghavan.

== Personal life ==
Kola Bhaskar's son Balakrishna Kola made his acting debut with Maalai Naerathu Mayakkam (2016).

== Death ==
Kola Bhaskar died on November 4, 2020.

== Filmography ==
=== Tamil films ===
- 7G Rainbow Colony (2004)
- Oru Kalluriyin Kathai (2005)
- Pudhupettai (2006)
- Kedi (2006)
- Pokkiri (2007)
- Ninaithu Ninaithu Parthen (2007)
- Yaaradi Nee Mohini (2008)
- Villu (2009)
- Kanden Kadhalai (2009)
- Aayirathil Oruvan (2010)
- Kutty (2010)
- Maathi Yosi (2010)
- Sattapadi Kutram (2011)
- Mayakkam Enna (2011)
- 3 (2012)
- Irandam Ulagam (2013)
- Thilagar (2015)

==== As producer ====
- Maalai Nerathu Mayakkam (2016)

=== Telugu films ===
- Sankalpam (1995)
- Sneham Kosam (1999)
- Nee Kosam (1999)
- Eduruleni Manishi (2001)
- Kushi (2001)
- Bava Nachadu (2001)
- Tholi Valapu (2001)
- Muthyam (2001)
- Aaduthu Paaduthu (2002)
- Friends (2002)
- Manasutho (2002)
- Sontham (2002)
- 7G Brindavan Colony (2004)
- Jagapati (2005)
- Pagale Vennela (2007)
- Aadavari Matalaku Arthale Verule (2007)
