= NGK (film) =

2019 political action thriller film by Selvaraghavan

- Theatrical release poster
- Directed by: Selvaraghavan
- Written by: Selvaraghavan
- Produced by: S. R. Prabhu
- Starring: Suriya; Sai Pallavi; Rakul Preet Singh
- Cinematography: Sivakumar Vijayan
- Edited by: Praveen K. L.
- Music by: Yuvan Shankar Raja
- Production company: Dream Warrior Pictures
- Distributed by: Reliance Entertainment
- Release date: 31 May 2019
- Running time: 150 minutes
- Country: India
- Language: Tamil

NGK (an abbreviation for Nandha Gopalan Kumaran) is a 2019 Indian Tamil-language political action film written and directed by Selvaraghavan. Suriya stars in the title role, with Sai Pallavi and Rakul Preet Singh as the lead actresses while Devaraj, Ponvannan, Nizhalgal Ravi, and Rajkumar play supporting roles. Yuvan Shankar Raja composed the music and Sivakumar Vijayan was the cinematographer. The film was produced by S. R. Prakashbabu and S. R. Prabhu of Dream Warrior Pictures.

Principal photography commenced in January 2018, concluding the following year in January. The film was released on 31 May 2019 to a mixed reception from both critics and audience.

== Plot ==
Nandha Gopalan Kumaran is a social worker and do-gooder, specialised in organic farming. He has huge support from the youngsters in his hometown, Srivilliputhur, who were inspired by him quitting his high-profile job to serve his country. He lives with his mother Viji, father Ramanan, a former military officer, and his wife, Geetha Kumari, who is a major strength for him.

While trying to solve the problem of a few youngsters, Kumaran meets an old friend, Raja, who is now the right-hand man of the area MLA. He is shock to see that what he has tried for a long time and failed is done through a single phone call by the area councillor. Meanwhile, a few shopkeepers, middlemen, and others who are alarmed by Kumaran's organic farming give him an ultimatum and later attack the people and burn their farms using chemicals when he refuses to give up. To make things good, Aruna Giri, a native, asks Kumaran to meet the MLA, Pandiyan, who happens to be a ruthless narcissist. He agrees to help if Kumaran joins his political party, KMK, along with 500 others from his villages, to which he is forced to comply. Pandiyan ill-treats Kumaran and asks him to clean his toilet, buy biriyani, and even bring a sex worker. Though furious at first, he decides to use the situation to gain Pandiyan's trust and, in the process do good for his village. He discovers that Raja is suffering from terminal cancer and will not live long.

Kumaran happens to meet Vanathi Thiagarajan, who was appointed by the party with a monthly income of 2 crore to help them win the upcoming elections. Impressed by Kumaran, she seeks his opinion and soon starts an affair with him, much to his wife's suspicion. Kumaran asks Vanathi to select Kesavamoorthy, the Home Minister, as their target. Despite threats from Killivazhavan "Killi," the Chief Minister, he manages to expose the ill deeds of Kesavamoorthy and arrange a scripted revolt for their party's benefit. However, Raja makes Kumaran kill him so as to intensify the people's emotions for their party and make the latter an important figure. Kumaran is arrested and later admitted to the hospital. Killi is shocked to find that Kumaran has turned the tide against him and decides to kill him. Kumaran is soon confronted by goons in doctors' disguise, whom he single-handedly defeats with great difficulty. The next day, he puts up a show in front of his villagers, gaining their trust. Pichai Muthu "Pichai", the leader of KMK, is alarmed by the popularity of Kumaran and also finds that Vanathi is helping him. He decides to nominate Kumaran as the candidate for the upcoming elections to the legislative assembly.

The night when he was to address his villagers, goons attacked them, and his wife gets stabbed, but the goons could not kill her as Vanathi came to her rescue. However, the goons successfully kill his parents. An angry Kumaran addresses the gathering by pretending to be with full vigour, causing them to kill Pichai and his accomplices while a bomb blasts. Vanathi decides to leave her relationship with Kumaran. Kumaran forms a new party, Makkal Munnetra Kazhakam, and wins the upcoming elections. He reunites with his wife. Kumaran becomes the new chief minister and while in a channel interview, he mentions strengthening his hold in the state.

== Cast ==
- Suriya as Nandha Gopalan Kumaran (NGK)
- Sai Pallavi as Geetha Kumari
- Rakul Preet Singh as Vanathi Thiyagarajan
- Devaraj as Killivazhavan, former Chief Minister
- Ponvannan as Pichai Muthu
- Nizhalgal Ravi as Retired Col. Ramanan, Kumaran's father
- Uma Padmanabhan as Viji
- Rajkumar as Raja
- Ilavarasu as MLA Pandiyan
- Bala Singh as Aruna Giri
- Vela Ramamoorthy as Ramamoorthy
- Thalaivasal Vijay as Saghayam
- Gopi Kannadasan as Minister Kesavamoorthy
- Sathish as Killi's personal secretary
- Shanthi Mani as Srivilliputhur resident
- Kambam Meena Sellamuthu as Selvi
- Karthigai Selvan as a news anchor
- Muthazhagan as Kumaran's friend

== Production ==
=== Development ===
On 17 November 2016, Suriya announced that his 36th film in the lead role, tentatively titled Suriya36, would be written and directed by Selvaraghavan and produced by S. R. Prakash Babu and S. R. Prabhu under Dream Warrior Pictures. On 30 October, the makers announced that principal photography would commence in January 2018. The cinematography was handled by Sivakumar Vijayan and the editing by Praveen K. L. The official title NGK was announced on 5 March 2018, and stands for the title character's name Nandha Gopalan Kumaran.

=== Casting and filming ===
In late February 2017, it was reported that Rakul Preet Singh was in consideration for the lead actress role. She reportedly signed the role in early August. In mid December, Sai Pallavi was reported to play a crucial role. Prabhu, during a media interaction in mid December, announced that Pallavi had signed the film, while Singh was still in talks. On 6 January 2018, Singh was confirmed to be part of the cast. Jagapathi Babu joined the cast that June. Principal photography began in January 2018, and wrapped in January 2019.

== Soundtrack ==
NGK

Soundtrack album by Yuvan Shankar Raja
- Released: 29 April 2019
- Recorded: 2018
- Genre: Soundtrack
- Length: 14:08
- Label: Sony Music
- Producer: Yuvan Shankar Raja

Yuvan Shankar Raja chronology
Super Deluxe (2019)	NGK (2019)	Sindhubaadh (2019)
External audio
- Official Audio Jukebox on YouTube
- Official Audio Jukebox on YouTube

The score and soundtrack were composed by Yuvan Shankar Raja. The first single "Thandalkaaran" was released on 12 April 2019. The audio launch was held on 29 April 2019.

Tamil Track-List
No.	Title	Lyrics	Singer(s)	Length
1.	"Thandalkaaran"	Kabilan	Ranjith	3:38
2.	"Thimiranumda"	Vignesh Shivan	Jithin Raj	3:56
3.	"Anbe Peranbe"	Uma Devi	Sid Sriram, Shreya Ghoshal	4:30
4.	"Pothachaalum"	Selvaraghavan	Shivam	2:04
Total length:				14:08

Telugu Track-List
No.	Title	Lyrics	Singer(s)	Length
1.	"Vaddeelodu Vachene"	Chandrabose	Sathyan	03:38
2.	"Thiragabadu"	Chandrabose	Jithin Raj	03:56
3.	"Prema O Premaa"	Chandrabose	Sid Sriram, Hemambiga	04:30
4.	"Anachivesinaa"	Rajesh A Moorthy	Sarath Santhosh	02:04
Total length:				14:08

== Marketing and release ==
A Twitter emoji related to NGK was unveiled on 31 May 2019, and was active until 4 June. NGK is the first Tamil film to release in South Korea. The satellite rights were sold to Star Vijay and digital streaming rights were secured by Amazon Prime Video. The film was released worldwide in theatres on 31 May 2019.

== Critical reception ==
Karthik Kumar of Hindustan Times stated that "Despite all the hype, Suriya starrer NGK fails as a political thriller. NGK could have been darker but it is not. Also, the film lacks cohesiveness and it is evident in its writing". M. Suganth of The Times of India gave it 2 out of 5 stars stating, "NGK is a letdown and doesn't fulfill any of the promises it has on paper". Srinivasa Ramanujam of The Hindu called it an oddly put together mash up of a movie. He concluded by stating, "NGK is Suriya trying to deliver a Selvaraghavan-ish performance when the director himself is trying to deliver a Shankar/Murugadoss-ish film. The results aren't extremely pleasing".

S. Subakeerthana of The Indian Express rated the film 2.5/5 and stated, "Works to some extent, elevated by Suriya's performance... NGK, on the whole isn't satisfying. Simply put, it is neither a Selvaraghavan nor a Suriya film." Sreedhar Pillai for Firstpost rated it 2.5/5 and stated that "NGK ends up becoming a compromise film which is neither massy nor classy." Gautaman Bhaskaran for News18 rated it 1.5/5 and stated that "We have seen this ever so often on screen." Sify wrote, "Technically, Sivakumar Vijayan's visuals stands out, Yuvan Shankar Raja's music is strictly average and the editing is incoherent".

== Reappraisal ==
Similar to the director's previous films Pudhupettai (2006) and Aayirathil Oruvan (2010), NGK initially received a mixed response from critics. The film has later undergone a critical reevaluation, with several websites such as Samayam and Sify decoding the film.

== Legacy ==
The film also became a subject of an internet meme, along with Suriya's other films, during that same year as his films had predicted the future scenarios around the world. Here, Vijay's political career and his illicit affair with Trisha Krishnan was predicted in the film.

== Accolades ==
Award	Date of ceremony (Note: Date is linked to the article about the awards held that year, wherever possible.)	Category	Recipient(s)	Result	Ref.
Tamil Nadu State Film Awards	13 February 2026	Best Lyricist	Kabilan	Won	
