= Aayirathil Oruvan (2010 film) =

2010 film by Selvaraghavan

- Promotional poster
- Directed by: Selvaraghavan
- Written by: Selvaraghavan
- Produced by: R. Ravindran Selvaraghavan
- Starring: Karthi; Reema Sen; Andrea Jeremiah; R. Parthiban
- Cinematography: Ramji
- Edited by: Kola Bhaskar
- Music by: G. V. Prakash Kumar
- Production company: Dream Valley Corporation
- Distributed by: Ayngaran International; Dream Valley Corporation
- Release date: 14 January 2010 (India)
- Running time: 154 minutes (Theatrical version); 181 minutes (Original uncut version)
- Country: India
- Language: Tamil

Aayirathil Oruvan (transl. One in a Thousand) is a 2010 Indian Tamil-language action-adventure film written and directed by Selvaraghavan and produced by R. Ravindran. The film stars Karthi, Reema Sen and Andrea Jeremiah with Parthiban playing a pivotal role. It revolves around three characters, Muthu, Anitha and Lavanya who embark on an adventure to search for a missing archaeologist. It is inspired loosely by the historical decline of the Chola dynasty and the rise of the Pandya dynasty.

The film's principal photography commenced in July 2007, and continued till 2008; the shooting of the film took place in various locations with 2,000 extras in areas including Chalakudy, Kerala and Jaisalmer, Rajasthan, and also filmed in Ramoji Film City in Hyderabad. The title Aayirathil Oruvan is taken from the 1965 film of the same name. The cinematography was handled by Ramji and editing work is done by Kola Bhaskar. The film's background score and soundtrack album is composed by G. V. Prakash Kumar, replacing Selvaraghavan's usual collaborator Yuvan Shankar Raja, whom he composed for his earlier films. The soundtrack received rave critical acclaim and emerged as one of the composer's best works till date.

The film languished in development hell due to slow progress of the shoot and the extensive pre-and post-production works, evading release dates ranging one year, Aayirathil Oruvan was released during the Thai Pongal festival, on 14 January 2010. The distribution rights were bought by Ayngaran International. Though the original film length was 181 minutes, it was then trimmed to 154 minutes for the theatrical release.

Upon release, the film garnered critical acclaim from both the critics and audience alike. The film developed a cult status over the following years. At the 58th Filmfare Awards South, the film won Best Supporting Actor award for R. Parthiepan.

== Plot ==
In 1279 AD, as the Pandyas drive the Cholas out of their kingdom in southern India, the Chola Emperor sends his surviving heir, his royal advisor (Raja Guru), and his surviving subjects into hiding to preserve the lineage. The refugees take along an idol sacred to Pandyas, infuriating them. Although the Pandyas extend their invasion into unexplored territories to recover the stolen idol and eradicate the Cholas, the refugees disappear without a trace.

Centuries later, in 2008, Indian archaeologists searching for the lost Chola clan using Pandyan clues mysteriously vanish. Following the disappearance of renowned archaeologist Dr. Chandramouli, the Indian government organizes a rescue expedition led by Anitha, a ruthless government officer, and supported by an army unit led by Major Ravisekharan. They recruit Chandramouli's estranged daughter, Lavanya, who supplies crucial documents compiled by her father detailing the route. Anitha also hires a team of porters led by Muthu, continually mistreating and manipulating them to ensure their cooperation.

The expedition travels to Min-gua, an isolated island near the borders of Vietnam, Thailand, and Malaysia. Navigating through seven deadly Chola defenses - including sea creatures, cannibals who cannot eat them as long as they do not look them in the face, violent indigenous warriors, venomous snakes, starvation, quicksand, and an abandoned village - most of the porters and soldiers die. Separated from the rest after their encounter with the snakes, Muthu, Anitha, and Lavanya reach a ruined village, where they are driven to near-madness by black magic before surrendering to a mysterious figure. He reveals himself as the aged Raja Guru, who has survived for eight centuries to guide the surviving Chola descendants back to their motherland of Thanjavur. The Cholas, now ruled by King Meignanandha Sivapaadha Sekara Chozhar, suffer from extreme drought and await the prophesied messenger destined to lead them back to Thanjavur.

The Chola King and the priests consult their deities and learn that among the three, one is a Chola, one is a Pandya, and one is a commoner. When stripped, a tiger tattoo (the royal emblem of Cholas) is revealed on Muthu's back. However, the king dismisses Muthu due to his unrefined demeanour and orders all three captives to be executed as sacrifices. Before they could be executed, Anitha pricks her finger, using her blood to perform ancient rites and claims to be the true messenger. The Cholas celebrate her arrival, enslaving Muthu and Lavanya.

Unbeknownst to the Cholas, Anitha is a secret descendant of the Pandyas, acting in league with the expedition sponsor and Ravisekharan, the sole surviving officer. Overcome with emotion upon finding the Pandyan idol, Anitha attempts to seduce the king and convince him to march to the mainland. However, her behaviour arouses the king's suspicion, as legend foretells that the true messenger would be beaten, bring rain to the drought-stricken land, and console the suffering people upon arrival.

Fearing discovery, Anitha attempts to assassinate the Raja Guru, poisons the village wells, and uses black magic to mind-control a Chola girl into transmitting coordinates to Ravisekharan, who arrives with reinforcements. Realizing his error, the king recognizes Muthu to be the true messenger after he fulfills the prophecy's signs. Before dying, the Raja Guru transfers his mystical powers to Muthu.

Ravisekharan's heavily armed troops launch a brutal assault on the clan. Despite fighting valiantly, the primitive Chola warriors are overwhelmed by modern weaponry, leading to widespread slaughter and captivity. Devastated, the king dies, prompting his surviving subjects to drown themselves alongside his body in a ritual. Breaking free from his restraints using his powers, Muthu rescues the king's young heir. He escapes with the heir from Anitha and the army, fulfilling the prophecy by carrying the Chola legacy toward its homeland.

== Cast ==
- Karthi as Muthu, a porter from Chennai
- Reema Sen as Anitha Pandiyan (Nambirattiyaar), an intelligence officer
- Andrea Jeremiah as Lavanya Chandramouli, an archaeologist
- R. Parthiban as Meignanandha Sivapaadha Sekara Chozhar, a descendant of Rajendra Chola III and a king of the Chola dynasty in exile
- Pratap K. Pothen as Chandramouli, an archaeologist and Lavanya's father
- Azhagam Perumal as Ravisekharan, an army officer
- Crane Manohar as Muthu's uncle
- V. Nambirajan as Chola's Rajaguru
- Abhinaya as the Chola king's daughter

== Production ==
=== Development ===
After the reception to his 2006 gangster film, Pudhupettai, Selvaraghavan took a sabbatical to plan future projects and set up a production company, White Elephants, whose first project Idhu Maalai Nerathu Mayakkam started in November 2006. The film was co-produced by new producer R. Ravindran, and the first schedule began with Karthi, whose first film, Paruthiveeran, was awaiting release, and Sandhya. The film was stalled in early 2007 due to cinematographer Arvind Krishna's decision to leave White Elephants and the project was eventually shelved. In July 2007, Selvaraghavan announced a new film with a new team of Karthi and Reema Sen in the cast, with Ramji replacing regular Arvind Krishna as the cinematographer. It was Sen's first venture into this genre following a series of roles in commercial projects. Erum Ali, wife of actor Abbas, became the team's head costume designer, whilst Selvaraghavan's sister-in-law and Rajinikanth's daughter, Aishwarya Dhanush, was signed on as an associate director. The film was named after a popular M. G. Ramachandran film, Aayirathil Oruvan. The producer was announced to be R. Ravindran whilst Yuvan Shankar Raja was appointed as music director following five previous successful soundtracks in Selvaraghavan films. Andrea Jeremiah was also signed for a role in the film in October 2007, in her second film after Pachaikili Muthucharam, and director-actor Azhagam Perumal followed suit in November 2007.

=== Filming and post-production ===
After extensive development and pre-production which took four months for scripting, the film started the first schedule in the forests of Chalakudy in Kerala with Karthi, Reema Sen and Andrea during October 2007. Shooting took place in various locations throughout India also including Kerala and Jaisalmer, Rajasthan. The project developed a reputation for its gruelling shoots, a novel concept in Tamil films, at an early stage of production. Thirty-five days into the shoot, Selvaraghavan gave a statement that the film was forty percent over and the film should release by May 2008 whilst also mentioning that rains in Kerala had led to the budget going over expectations two months into the project. In January 2008, the unit moved to Jaisalmer in Rajasthan to shoot in the deserts in the region, but they were delayed again by unseasonal rains. Missing its original release date, the film's progress carried on through 2008, with shooting occurring towards the end of the year inside sets at Ramoji Film City in Hyderabad. In the studios, choreographer Shivshankar composed a classical dance for Reema Sen and Parthiepan, and the sequence was shot over twenty days. Shooting carried on in sets for three more months with second half scenes being recorded. Shoots in all regions were tough and demanding for the crew as the film featured more than three thousand junior artistes from a variety of unions across India, with the language barrier becoming a problem.

Eighteen months into shooting, the project began to face questions about its progress, with the producer, Ravindran, complaining to the Tamil Film Producers Council that Karthi was trying to change his look for his next film, Paiyaa, following the long period he had spent with Aayirathil Oruvan. In February 2009, filming was completed after 263 days of shooting; therefore the producers signaled for a summer release but it was postponed by six months.

When asked by the media during production about the lengthy shooting, the lead actor said that the cast had also been unaware of how long the film's shoot was going to carry on. Reema Sen originally signed for forty days whilst Andrea Jeremiah signed for three months, without knowing that the film would eventually take 263 days of filming. Furthermore, Parthiepan claimed to have been signed for forty days, whilst his segment lasted up to 140 days.

In March 2008, after filming had already begun, music director Yuvan Shankar Raja was ousted from the project due to differences of opinion. G. V. Prakash Kumar succeeded him; it was his biggest project to that point. Rambo Rajkumar, the film's stunt director, died in April 2009 and was posthumously praised for his action choreography. Soon after the filming finished, the lead actors moved onto other projects, as did Selvaraghavan whilst post-production continued. During production, news websites had linked Selvaraghavan romantically with Andrea Jeremiah, to the pair's displeasure; in August 2009, he divorced his wife, Sonia Agarwal. During the period, G. V. Prakash Kumar and Selva also worked on the music in Mumbai whilst re-recording was also held in Austria and London.

Aayirathil Oruvan languished in production hell due to slow progress of the shoot and the extensive pre- and post-production works, with release dates being postponed for a total of a year. During its release, the film's budget was reported to be ₹32 crore. However, in August 2021, Selvaraghavan stated that the film's actual budget was ₹18 crore and they had announced an inflated budget to create hype.

== Music ==
Aayirathil Oruvan

Soundtrack album by G. V. Prakash Kumar
- Released: 14 June 2009
- Recorded: 2008–2009
- Genre: Feature film soundtrack
- Length: 54:27
- Language: Tamil
- Label: Sony Music
- Producer: G. V. Prakash Kumar

G. V. Prakash Kumar chronology
Angadi Theru (2009)	Aayirathil Oruvan (2009)	Irumbu Kottai Murattu Singam (2010)

The film was announced in 2007 with Selvaraghavan's regular music director, Yuvan Shankar Raja, following five successive successful albums together, but after his ouster during filming, work for the soundtrack began again from scratch under new music director G. V. Prakash Kumar. "Adada Vaa", the only song composed by Yuvan Shankar Raja for the film, was removed after his departure and instead used in the Vishnuvardhan-directional another long-delayed Tamil film Sarvam (2009). As Selvaraghavan had already filmed the visuals for that song, Prakash Kumar had to match the visuals and the choreography. "Un Mela Aasadhan", which he composed as the replacement, was noted for sounding similar to "Adada Vaa".

The album was well received. It features ten tunes; six songs, two alternate versions and another two theme songs, with vocals from singers Karthik, Vijay Yesudas, Bombay Jayashri, Nithyasree Mahadevan and P. B. Sreenivas, who made a comeback to playback singing with his song. Moreover, Dhanush and Aishwarya sang for the album along with the composer, Prakash Kumar and Andrea Jeremiah. Lyrics for the songs were written by Vairamuthu, Veturi, Selvaraghavan and Andrea Jeremiah. For a song set in the thirteenth century, research was carried out to find instruments used during that period. A Yaazh, a melodic instrument used in the Sangam Period, and a horn made from animal horns from Bhutan were used.

The soundtrack to Aayirathil Oruvan was released on 14 June 2009 at a University Auditorium in Chennai. Prominent film personalities across the South Indian film industry attended the launch, which became one of the first films to play live music at the audio launch. It featured live performances from G. V. Prakash Kumar and Andrea Jeremiah for several songs, as well as songs from Dhanush and Aishwarya Dhanush. Furthermore, the night featured a fashion show from Erum Ali, a Kalari performance, Chenda Melam by women from Kerala, a classical dance performance by an actress Poorna and choreographed by Sivashankar. The soundtrack garnered critical acclaim and was considered Prakash Kumar's finest work to date. Furthermore, shortly after the music release, an album success meet was held on 20 November 2009.

In the film, only five songs from the album are used in their entirety. Moreover, one song in the film, not included in the soundtrack, is the original version of "Atho Andha Paravai" from the 1965 film Aayirathil Oruvan, which was bought from the original copyright holders of the song in December 2007. The film's picturisation of the three exploring the ruins of the fallen kingdom in the song, were praised.

All music is composed by G. V. Prakash Kumar, except the track "Un Mela Aasadhaan" was composed by Yuvan Shankar Raja and remixed and recorded by the former. The remix version of "Atho Andha Paravai" from the 1965 Tamil film Aayirathil Oruvan was not included in the soundtrack release due to the rights of original song are held by Saregama music label, despite being featured in the film.

No.	Title	Lyrics	Singer(s)	Length
1.	"Oh Eesa" (Composers Mix)	Selvaraghavan, Andrea Jeremiah	Karthik, Andrea Jeremiah	5:22
2.	"Maalai Neram"	Selvaraghavan	Andrea Jeremiah, G. V. Prakash Kumar	5:58
3.	"Un Mela Aasadhaan"	Selvaraghavan	Dhanush, Aishwarya Rajinikanth, Andrea Jeremiah	4:30
4.	"The King Arrives"		Neil Mukherjee & Madras Augustin Choir	3:02
5.	"Thaai Thindra Mannae" (The Cholan Ecstasy)	Vairamuthu, Veturi	Vijay Yesudas, Nithyasree Mahadevan, Shri Krishna	5:57
6.	"Pemmane"	Vairamuthu	P. B. Sreenivas, Bombay Jayashri	5:59
7.	"Celebration of Life"		Instrumental	3:32
8.	"Thaai Thindra Mannae" (Classical Version)	Vairamuthu	Vijay Yesudas	7:17
9.	"Indha Padhai"	Selvaraghavan	G. V. Prakash Kumar	4:53
10.	"Oh Eesa" (Club Mix)	Selvaraghavan	Big Nikk	5:03
11.	"Atho Andha Paravai" (Remix)	Kannadasan	T. M. Soundararajan	3:04
Total length:				54:27

== Release ==
Aayirathil Oruvan is considered as one of the longest films in Tamil cinema, with an original running time of 181 minutes (3 hours, 1 minute). However, the film's runtime was reduced to 154 minutes (2 hours, 34 minutes), in order to avert difficulties faced during the theatrical release. Towards the end of the year, the film began to announce release date of Christmas which was later further delayed to coincide with the Pongal festival. A date clash occurred with Karthi's Paiyaa, with an eventual hearing leading to the Karthi's latter film being delayed. Throughout December 2009, release work began with a trailer and promotional songs being released on 13 December. The film was subsequently certified before the end of the year by the Central Board of Film Certification and settled with an adult rating, after Selvaraghavan refused to remove some gory scenes. It received a 12A rating from British Board of Film Classification. On 31 December, it was announced that the film was sold worldwide for ₹35 crore (US$3.6 million) for theatrical, television and other rights.

== Reception ==
=== Critical response ===
Sify cited that the film represented "something new in the placid world of Tamil cinema", adding that it "broke away from the shackles of the stereotypes". Selvaraghavan also was praised by the reviewer with claims that "the director transports us to a whole new world and at the end of it all, we are dumb struck by the visuals, the packaging and the new way of storytelling". Rediff.com gave the film 3.5 out of 5, claiming that viewers should "steel [their] stomach before [they] watch it" and "regardless of the minor discrepancies, AO is definitely a movie to watch".

=== Box office ===
Released in 600 screens worldwide, Aayirathil Oruvan was declared a "hit" in Telugu and an "average" in Tamil. It took the biggest opening by a considerable distance earning ₹0.7 crore (equivalent to ₹1.6 crore or US$160,000 in 2023) on its opening weekend in Chennai. In the United Kingdom, the film opened across 7 screens and grossed £29,517 ($44,868) in the opening week. The film, distributed by Ayngaran International opened at 22nd place. The film grossed $440,000 in Malaysia, while opening in seventh. The film was also dubbed in Telugu as Yuganiki Okkadu. Similarly, the Telugu dubbed version of the film which released on 5 February, took a strong opening. The Telugu version released across 93 screens across Andhra Pradesh & Telangana and grossed ₹1.78 crore (equivalent to ₹4.0 crore or US$410,000 in 2023) on its opening weekend.

== Awards ==
Ceremony	Award	Category	Recipients	Result
2nd Edison Awards	Edison Award	Best Thriller Film	Selvaraghavan	Won
58th Filmfare Awards South	Filmfare Awards South	Best Film	R. Ravindran	Nominated
58th Filmfare Awards South	Filmfare Awards South	Best Director	Selvaraghavan	Nominated
58th Filmfare Awards South	Filmfare Awards South	Best Actor	Karthi	Nominated
58th Filmfare Awards South	Filmfare Awards South	Best Actress	Reema Sen	Nominated
58th Filmfare Awards South	Filmfare Awards South	Best Supporting Actor	R. Parthiepan	Won
58th Filmfare Awards South	Filmfare Awards South	Best Supporting Actress	Andrea Jeremiah	Nominated
58th Filmfare Awards South	Filmfare Awards South	Best Music Director	G. V. Prakash Kumar	Nominated
58th Filmfare Awards South	Filmfare Awards South	Best Male Playback Singer	Dhanush for "Un Mela Aasadhaan"	Nominated
58th Filmfare Awards South	Filmfare Awards South	Best Female Playback Singer	Andrea Jeremiah, Aishwarya R. Dhanush for "Un Mela Aasadhaan"	Nominated
5th Vijay Awards	Vijay Awards	Vijay Award for Best Villain	Reema Sen	Nominated
5th Vijay Awards	Vijay Awards	Vijay Award for Best Supporting Actor	R. Parthiepan	Won
5th Vijay Awards	Vijay Awards	Vijay Award for Best Art Director	T. Santhanam	Nominated
5th Vijay Awards	Vijay Awards	Vijay Award for Best Stunt Director	Rambo Rajkumar	Nominated
5th Vijay Awards	Vijay Awards	Vijay Award for Best Costume Designer	Erum Ali	Won
5th Vijay Awards	Vijay Awards	Vijay Award for Favourite Song	"Unmela Aasadhaan"	Won
4th Ananda Vikatan Cinema Awards	Ananda Vikatan Cinema Awards	Ananda Vikatan Award for best villain – Female	Reema Sen	Won

== Sequel ==
On 1 January 2021, Selvaraghavan released the first-look poster for the sequel Aayirathil Oruvan 2, confirming that it would star Dhanush. A character sketch of his role was released by Dhanush through his Twitter page. However, as of 2026, it languishes in development hell.
