= Nenjam Marappathillai (2021 film) =

2021 film by Selvaraghavan

- Theatrical release poster
- Directed by: Selvaraghavan
- Written by: Selvaraghavan
- Produced by: P. Madan
- Starring: S. J. Suryah; Nandita Swetha; Regina Cassandra
- Cinematography: Arvind Krishna
- Edited by: Prasanna GK
- Music by: Yuvan Shankar Raja
- Production companies: Escape Artists Motion Pictures; GLO Studios
- Distributed by: Rockfort Entertainment
- Release date: 5 March 2021
- Running time: 142 minutes
- Country: India
- Language: Tamil

Nenjam Marappathillai (transl. The heart never forgets) is a 2021 Indian Tamil-language horror film (Note: Sources differ as to the exact genre of the film, though many call it horror. IANS reported it would be a horror drama, Haricharan Pudipeddi of Hindustan Times called it a horror thriller, while others speculated it would be a gothic horror film, a "horror-comedy", a "straight horror film" or a "psycho-comedy". Selvaraghavan initially refused to confirm what the genre was, but later said it was indeed a horror film.) written and directed by Selvaraghavan. Jointly produced by Escape Artists Motion Pictures and GLO Studios, the film stars S. J. Suryah, Nandita Swetha, and Regina Cassandra. It follows a woman who obtains work as a nanny in an affluent family, but the patriarch of the family lusts for her.

Nenjam Marappathillai began production in January 2016 and was completed that June. Yuvan Shankar Raja composed the film score and soundtrack, with cinematography and editing handled respectively by Arvind Krishna and Prasanna GK. The film, originally intended for release in 2017, remained unreleased for several years because of various issues, including the introduction of the Goods and Services Tax. After four years of delay, it was released on 5 March 2021.

== Plot ==
Mariam is a selfless orphan raised in a Christian orphanage by nuns. She gets an offer to look after a child in an affluent household in a small village and accepts the offer, so that she can contribute her share of money to the orphanage's betterment. She reaches the household and finds a little boy, Rishi, and his wealthy parents, Ramsay and Swetha. Ramsay, formerly Ramasamy, was an orphan who started working in the cotton mill of his current father-in-law. He had risen step by step, often through nefarious means, and finally made Swetha, the only heir of the millionaire, fall in love with him using drugs. He married Swetha and currently manages the new cotton mill, albeit his father-in-law still having strict control of the business.

Rishi takes an instant liking to Mariam, and her tenderness with the boy contrasts with the coldness she receives from Ramsay and his wife. Along with them live four male servants, including a security guard and the personal assistant/cook. Though uncomfortable in the beginning, Mariam learns to live there due to her financial commitments to the orphanage. Ramsay is smitten by Mariam's beauty and lusts after her. He tries to misbehave with her on multiple occasions, and Mariam's attempts to complain to Swetha but it goes in vain.

One night, Ramsay cleverly plots a scheme, and sends Swetha out of town for a board meeting, and sexually assaults Mariam along with the male servants. He asks them to kill Mariam and dispose of her body. Soon, Mariam realises that she has come back to the household as a ghost and starts haunting them. Rishi is able to see her, and numerous paranormal activities start happening in the household simultaneously. Out of fear, one of the male servants accidentally blurts out the truth about the murder to Swetha, who is filled with rage. She asks everyone to dispose of the evidences, burn Mariam's buried body, and keep the incident a secret. As they proceed to do so, each of the servants is killed, one after the other, by Mariam.

Left with no option, Swetha herself exhumes and successfully burns Mariam's body. Mariam's spirit is destroyed and reaches God. The Holy Sprit possesses Swetha instead and kills the cook, who was the last of the servants left, and proceeds towards Ramsay, who puts up a fight. "Swetha" submerges Ramsay and leaves. Seemingly unaffected, Ramsay returns to the house to see "Swetha" and Rishi happily reunited. He runs into "Swetha," only to realise that he is dead and has become a ghost.

== Cast ==
- S. J. Suryah as Ramasamy "Ramsay"
- Nandita Swetha as Swetha
- Regina Cassandra as Mariam
- Arvind Krishna as Kalyan

== Production ==
=== Development ===
In December 2015, IANS reported that Gautham Vasudev Menon would be collaborating with Selvaraghavan to produce a horror film under his production house Ondraga Entertainment. Composer Santhosh Narayanan was signed on, marking his maiden collaboration with Selvaraghavan. Selvaraghavan's regular collaborator Arvind Krishna joined as the cinematographer, while editor Prasanna GK and art director Vijay Adhinathan were also included. Santhosh was eventually replaced by Yuvan Shankar Raja in April 2016, thus collaborating after a long time with Selvaraghavan.

In a 2016 interview with the magazine Ritz, in response to speculation that the film was either a "horror-comedy", a "straight horror film" or a "psycho-comedy", Selvaraghavan refused to confirm or deny what the genre was, but said he sought to invent a new one. However, in a 2021 interview with The Times of India, he said he had neither seen a horror film nor read a horror novel in his life, but his brother Dhanush was a fan of the genre; so Selvaraghavan decided to make a horror film without having seen any, laying the foundation for the film that would later be titled Nenjam Marappathillai. Another motive for making the film was to experiment with a genre he had not tried before.

=== Casting ===
In December 2015, S. J. Suryah was announced as the lead actor. A month later, Regina Cassandra and Nandita Swetha were announced as the lead actresses. According to Selvaraghavan, all three actors were his first choices for their respective roles. He said he cast Suryah to compensate for a project he cast him in but swiftly dropped. During the auditions, Selvaraghavan spoke to Suryah for five minutes, Cassandra for five minutes and Nandita for two minutes.

=== Filming ===
The film was launched after a simple muhurta ceremony held at Menon's office in Thiruvanmiyur, Chennai in January 2016, with the title of the film announced as Nenjam Marappathillai. It was also reported that the film was not a remake of the 1963 film of the same name, but an original script. Selvaraghavan said he did not title the film after the 1963 film, but because he believed he would never forget Yuvan. The film was initially planned to be shot within a single schedule, which was to be completed in March 2016; however principal photography wrapped on 30 June 2016.

== Music ==
=== Soundtrack ===
Nenjam Marappathillai

Soundtrack album by Yuvan Shankar Raja
- Released: 24 November 2016
- Recorded: 2015–2016
- Studio: U1 Records
- Genre: Feature film soundtrack
- Length: 15:50
- Language: Tamil
- Label: U1 Records
- Producer: Yuvan Shankar Raja

Yuvan Shankar Raja chronology
| Dharma Durai (2016) | Nenjam Marappathillai (2016) | Chennai 600028 II (2016) |
External audio
- Official Audio Jukebox on YouTube

Yuvan Shankar Raja decided to reunite with Selvaraghavan for a film titled Kaan, but as the project was eventually shelved, Selvaraghavan decided to choose Yuvan to score the soundtrack for Nenjam Marappathillai. The film marks Selvaraghavan's reunion with Yuvan after a hiatus of 8 years since they worked together on their last project Yaaradi Nee Mohini (2008). The soundtrack album was released on 24 November 2016.

The album features four songs with lyrics written by Selvaraghavan himself. The song "En Pondati Oorukku Poita" is titled after a line spoken by Janagaraj's character in Agni Natchathiram (1988).

K. Siddharth of Sify gave 3 out of 5 to the album stating it as a "Powerhouse Soundtrack from Yuvan-Selva!" Karthik Srinivasan from Milliblog noted it was "a wonderfully quirky soundtrack".

Track listing
| No. | Title | Singer(s) | Length |
|---|---|---|---|
| 1. | "Good Bad & Ugly" | Aishvarya Khumar | 4:01 |
| 2. | "Kannungala Chellangala (Tribute To Kaviarasar Kannadasan)" | Yuvan Shankar Raja | 4:08 |
| 3. | "Maalai Varum Vennila" | Yuvan Shankar Raja, Dhanush | 4:00 |
| 4. | "En Pondati Oorukku Poita" | Yuvan Shankar Raja, S. J. Suryah | 3:41 |
| Total length: | | | 15:50 |

=== Background score ===
In March 2025, an extended OST for the film was released, featuring background scores and additional songs from the film.

Track listing
| No. | Title | Length |
|---|---|---|
| 1. | "The Bonding" | 3:04 |
| 2. | "Lust at First Sight" | 2:30 |
| 3. | "Meeting With The One" | 2:03 |
| 4. | "Prelude – Rockstar" | 1:14 |
| 5. | "Pain of An Angel" | 3:33 |
| 6. | "Destruction and Death" | 2:22 |
| 7. | "Birth of a Soul" | 2:55 |
| 8. | "The Wandering" | 3:55 |
| 9. | "The Lullaby" | 4:02 |
| 10. | "The Rebirth" | 3:06 |
| 11. | "The Devil's Smile" | 2:01 |
| 12. | "The Devil's Mind" | 1:27 |
| 13. | "The God's Arrival" | 2:17 |
| 14. | "Rockstar's Melody" | 56 |
| 15. | "The Grand Finale" | 4:06 |
| Total length: | | 39:31 |

Extended soundtrack
| No. | Title | Lyrics | Singer(s) | Length |
|---|---|---|---|---|
| 1. | "Devil's Duet" | Selvaraghavan | Yuvan Shankar Raja | 3:05 |
| 2. | "Bring it On!" | Selvaraghavan | Yuvan Shankar Raja | 2:28 |
| Total length: | | | | 5:33 |

== Release ==
Nenjam Marappathillai was initially scheduled to release on 23 June 2017, then got postponed by a week to 30 June, but was delayed indefinitely due to the introduction of Goods and Services Tax by the Central Government. In August 2017, Selvaraghavan said there was no clarity on the film's release. While co-producer Siddharth Rao blamed Gautham Menon for the delay in the film's release, Menon released a press statement in March 2018 saying that he was in no way involved with the film "but for listening to the idea and pointing out the script and the film to escape artiste Madan". Menon denied being a producer or shareholder, and said Madan only wanted his name on the posters, although he felt he did not deserve that.

More than a year later, in December 2019, Yuvan Shankar Raja said the film would be releasing soon and unveiled a new poster, although no release date was announced. In December 2020, the makers held a private screening for the film. On 8 February 2021, it was announced by the makers that the film would release in theatres on 5 March 2021, with Rockfort Entertainment distributing the film. On 2 March, the Madras High Court issued an injunction prohibiting the film's release until 15 March 2021, saying Escape Artists owed Radiance Media Group a sum of ₹12.4 million (US$130,000). Two days later, Suryah announced that the legal issue had been resolved, and the film released as scheduled. It began streaming on ZEE5 from 14 May 2021 onwards.

== Critical reception ==
Baradwaj Rangan wrote for Film Companion, "Nenjam Marappathillai is far from perfect, but scene for scene, it's a thrilling portal into the mind of Selvaraghavan." He concluded, "Nenjam Marappathillai—propelled by a grand Yuvan Shankar Raja score that matches the director's intensity and eccentricity—is the best thing Selvaraghavan has made in ages. Maybe breathing fresh life into stale genre premises is really his thing." Haricharan Pudipeddi of Hindustan Times wrote, "What's refreshing about Nenjam Marappathillai is that it is devoid of all the usual stereotypes one could associate with horror movies. We don't get the usual creaking doors and close up of the ghost on a character's face. We still get some predictable moments but the way Selva treats them make for an engaging watch."

Sify praised the performances of the lead cast, but criticised the film's second half and visual effects near the climax. M. Suganth of The Times of India rated the film 3 out of 5 and called it "a minor return to form for Selvaraghavan, who smartly uses his loud filmmaking style to give us a film that is over the top in a good way." Manoj Kumar R of The Indian Express also rated it 3 stars out of 5, saying, "Nenjam Marappathillai is what a director might find when he goes to the shooting with a vow to not follow the script. Instead, he rolls up his sleeves, and goes to work with his crew, determined to create something more wonderful, and tangible than what his mind imagined in the writer's room."

== Controversy ==
While promoting the film in an interview with Baradwaj Rangan, Selvaraghavan was asked whether the film was a "veiled commentary" on a different matter, given that the film depicts God pitched against a character named Ramasamy. Initially silent, he was pressured by Rangan to answer, and replied "Yes". This caused controversy among followers of Periyar, whose real name was E. V. Ramaswamy, as they believed Selvaraghavan was defaming their idol. Selvaraghavan later apologised, saying he acted without properly comprehending the question asked.
