= 7/G Rainbow Colony =

2004 Indian romantic drama film

- Promotional poster of the Tamil version
- Directed by: Selvaraghavan
- Written by: Selvaraghavan
- Produced by: A. M. Rathnam
- Starring: Ravi Krishna; Sonia Agarwal
- Cinematography: Arvind Krishna
- Edited by: Kola Bhaskar
- Music by: Yuvan Shankar Raja
- Production company: Sri Surya Movies
- Release dates: October 15, 2004 (Tamil); November 6, 2004 (Telugu)
- Running time: 185 minutes (Tamil); 174 minutes (Telugu)
- Country: India
- Languages: Tamil; Telugu

7/G Rainbow Colony is a 2004 Indian romantic drama film written and directed by Selvaraghavan. The film was shot simultaneously in Tamil and Telugu; the latter titled 7G Brindavan Colony. It stars debutant Ravi Krishna and Sonia Agarwal. The music was scored by Yuvan Shankar Raja, whilst Arvind Krishna performed the cinematography. The film deals with unrequited love of a boy towards a girl.

Released on 15 October 2004, the film received critical acclaim and was a box-office success. Over the years, the has film attained cult status and mass following. Ravi Krishna received the Filmfare Best Male Debut (South) for his performance, whilst Yuvan was awarded the Filmfare Best Music Director Award. A sequel titled 7/G Rainbow Colony 2 starring Ravi Krishna and Anaswara Rajan is in production.

== Plot ==
The movie begins with Kadhir (Ravi in Telugu version) heading to work. He is distracted throughout the day and even instructs his assistant to postpone an important meeting with a big client. He then waits for someone at Marina Beach in Chennai (Hussain Sagar in Hyderabad in the Telugu version) with a bouquet. His best friend Lakshmi sees him and asks who he is waiting for. Kadhir explains that he is waiting to meet his girlfriend Anitha for their date. Flashbacks show how Kadhir first met Anitha.

Kadhir belongs to a lower middle class family, living with his parents and younger sister in Rainbow Colony in Chennai (Brundavan Colony, Hyderabad in the Telugu version). He is perceived as a good-for-nothing because he skips classes, fails exams, and gets into fights. Kadhir believes his father hates him and often quarrels with him, even threatening to leave the house, only to be persuaded by his mother not to do so. Kadhir's life changes when a Marwadi family, once well-off, moves into the same colony after losing their business. Kadhir is attracted to Anitha, the daughter of his new neighbour. Although he tries to woo her, she treats him with disdain. One day, Kadhir confesses to Anitha that he loves her. He tells her that, having always been ridiculed, he found respite in the fact that she at least bothered to look at him. He promises to wipe her thoughts from his mind, as he is not right for her.

Despite himself, Kadhir continues pursuing her. Anitha realises Kadhir is not useless when Lakshmi tells her he has seen Kadhir dismantle and assemble a motorcycle within minutes each time they steal a bike to get drunk. Anitha takes Kadhir to a Hero Honda dealer and asks them to hire him. He is promised a job if he can assemble a bike. Initially, the lethargic Kadhir is uninterested and gives up. Anitha takes him to the washroom and slaps him before revealing that she has fallen in love with him. She then tells him they can be together if only he gets a proper job and straightens out his life. Kadhir then demonstrates his skill in motorcycle assembly, securing a good job with the dealer.

Later that evening, Kadhir plans a treat for his friends. However, Anitha confronts him and makes him tell the good news to his parents first to get their blessings. However, Kadhir's father berates him, as usual, for taking a job instead of finishing college. Later that night, Kadhir overhears his father telling his mother how proud he is of their son for getting a job at such a prestigious company, which is not easy. The only reason the father did not openly praise Kadhir was that he feared Kadhir might misjudge him for showing him respect, but now that Kadhir is earning money for their household, he is openly praised. Only then does Kadhir realise his father's love for him and weeps in joy. Anitha's mother discovers the intimacy between Kadhir and Anitha and refuses to let them continue dating, even as Kadhir's father tries to persuade her otherwise. Anitha's family is heavily indebted to another Northern Indian family that has been supporting them since Anitha's father suffered losses in his business. Anitha's parents want Anitha to marry the son of the family that has helped them.

Using her friend's marriage as a ruse and with the unwitting help of her friend's aunt, Anitha escapes her home and travels with Kadhir to a tourist place near Thekkady in Kerala, and they end up in a hotel room. Anitha reveals she has made the biggest decision of her life: to make love to him so he will not regret falling in love with her when she marries the man her parents chose. Though stunned by her decision, Kadhir goes along with it, and the two consummate their love. The next morning, Kadhir and Anitha argue when Kadhir says he wants Anitha to live with him, while Anitha accuses him of being attracted to her only because of sex. They continue arguing as they exit the hotel, which culminates in Kadhir slapping Anitha in anger, causing her to cross the road alone in tears. While a guilt-ridden Kadhir calls out to Anitha, she is knocked down by a truck as a helpless Kadhir watches; he is then also hit by another speeding vehicle. Anitha dies gruesomely on the spot as she is subsequently run over by several vehicles, and Kadhir is injured. The following day, he is shocked to find the mere remains of Anitha in the hospital mortuary. Though heartbroken, Kadhir, to save Anitha's dignity, tells the police that she never accepted his love and her death was really an accident. Her mother blesses him as she leaves. Though the police want to file a murder case against Kadhir, Anitha's mother refuses to name him as a murderer. Shortly after Anitha's funeral, Kadhir unsuccessfully tries to commit suicide, only to end up causing a ruckus in traffic and getting assaulted by the angry crowd, but a group of nuns saves him. He then hallucinates Anitha's spirit coming, telling him to live life to the fullest and that she will always be with him.

Back in the present day, it is revealed that Kadhir has become successful in his life but has remained mentally damaged since Anitha's death. He still believes that she is alive and always imagines talking to her. The film ends with Kadhir talking to himself at the beach, thinking that he is talking to Anitha.

== Cast ==
| Cast (Tamil) | Cast (Telugu) | Role (Tamil) | Role (Telugu) |
|---|---|---|---|
| Ravi Krishna | | Kadhir | Ravi |
| Sonia Agarwal | | Anitha | Anitha |
| Suman Setty | | Lakshmi Narayanan | Lakshmi Narayana |
| Vijayan | Chandra Mohan | Kadhir's father | Ravi's father |
| Sudha | | Kadhir's mother | Ravi's mother |
| Sudeepa Pinky | | Anu | Anu |
| Rathan | | Managing Director of Hero Honda | Managing Director of Hero Honda |
| Savita Prabhune | | Anitha's mother | Anitha's mother |
| Manorama | | Shweta's aunt (Cameo appearance) | Shweta's aunt (Cameo appearance) |
| Mayoori | | "Naam Vayathukku Vanthom" | "Mem Vayasuku Vachcham" |

== Production ==
Selvaraghavan revealed that the inspiration for 7G Rainbow Colony came from his college days when he had been fascinated with a Punjabi girl during his education in KK Nagar. He based several of the scenes on real-life happenings with his friends, revealing that the film was over 70% biographical and the lead character was an "average" person like himself. Ravi Krishna, son of producer A. M. Rathnam, made his acting debut. According to him, Suriya and Madhavan were the initial choices for his role, but could not accept as they were busy with other films. Swathi Reddy was initially cast as the lead actress in 2003; she shot for around 20 days but left to focus on her education. Sonia Agarwal was later cast in her role. The film was simultaneously shot in Tamil and Telugu languages; scenes were shot in Tamil first and then in Telugu. Filming took place mostly in Hyderabad. The Telugu version was initially titled as Naakoka Girl Friend Kaavali.

== Soundtrack ==
7G Rainbow Colony

Soundtrack album by Yuvan Shankar Raja
- Released: 21 May 2004
- Recorded: 2004
- Genre: Soundtrack
- Length: 41:55
- Labels: Five Star Audio; Sun Music
- Producer: Yuvan Shankar Raja

Yuvan Shankar Raja chronology
| Perazhagan (2004) | 7G Rainbow Colony (2004) | Manmadhan (2004) |

Selvaraghavan teamed up once again with musician Yuvan Shankar Raja after Thulluvadho Ilamai and Kaadhal Kondein. The soundtrack features 10 tracks overall, two of which are Instrumentals. The lyrics were penned by Na. Muthukumar. Yuvan used live music for the score, for which he worked with a 40-piece orchestra for one month. The theme music is inspired by that for Johnny (1980), composed by Yuvan's father Ilaiyaraaja. The song "Kanaa Kaanum Kaalangal" is set in Madhuvanti, a Carnatic raga.

Yuvan received universal critical acclaim for the musical score as the songs and the film score were hailed as "excellent" and the album as a "great" and "must buy". Particularly, the instrumental track in the album was hailed by Indo-Asian News Service as "one of the most haunting instrumental tracks ever". The song became very popular and were topping the charts for some time.

All lyrics are written by Na. Muthukumar.

Tamil tracklist
| No. | Title | Singer(s) | Length |
|---|---|---|---|
| 1. | "Ninaithu Ninaithu Parthal" | Shreya Ghoshal | 4:37 |
| 2. | "Kanaa Kaanum Kaalangal 1" | Harish Raghavendra, Srimathumitha, Ustad Sultan Khan | 5:31 |
| 3. | "Naam Vayathukku" | P. Unnikrishnan, Yuvan Shankar Raja, Shalini, Ganga | 5:06 |
| 4. | "Music of Joy" (Instrumental) | - | 3:53 |
| 5. | "Kan Pesum Varthaigal" | Karthik | 5:50 |
| 6. | "Idhu Porkkalama" | Harish Raghavendra | 3:08 |
| 7. | "Kanaa Kaanum Kaalangal 2" | Ustad Sultan Khan, Srimathumitha | 5:32 |
| 8. | "January Madham" | Mathangi Jagdish, Kunal Ganjawala | 5:12 |
| 9. | "Walking Through The Rainbow" (instrumental) | - | 3:21 |
| 10. | "Ninaithu Ninaithu Parthen" | KK | 4:16 |
| 11. | "Ithu Enna Maatram" | P. B. Sreenivas |

All lyrics are written by Shiva Ganesh.

Telugu tracklist
| No. | Title | Singer(s) | Length |
|---|---|---|---|
| 1. | "Thalachi Thalachi Choosthe" | Shreya Ghoshal | 4:37 |
| 2. | "Kalalu Kane Kaalaalu" | Harish Raghavendra, Srimathumitha, Ustad Sultan Khan | 5:31 |
| 3. | "Mem Vayasuku Vachcham" | P. Unnikrishnan, Yuvan Shankar Raja, Shalini, Ganga | 5:06 |
| 4. | "Music of Joy" | Instrumental | 3:53 |
| 5. | "Kannula Baasalu Theliyavule" | Karthik | 5:50 |
| 6. | "Idhi Rana Rangama" | Harish Raghavendra | 3:08 |
| 7. | "Kalalu Kane Kaalaalu" | Harish Raghavendra, Srimathumitha | 5:32 |
| 8. | "January Masam" | Mathangi Jagdish, Kunal Ganjawala | 5:12 |
| 9. | "Walking Through The Rainbow (Theme Music)" | Instrumental | 3:21 |
| 10. | "Thalachi Thalachi Choosa" | KK | 4:16 |

== Release ==
7/G Rainbow Colony was released on 15 October 2004, and 7G Brindavan Colony on 6 November the same year. The film was given an A (adults only) certificate by the censor board. Despite this, in Chennai, minors were caught watching the film in a theatre. For allowing this to happen, four people attached to the theatre were arrested, including the booking clerk who sold the ticket, the usher who took the minors to the seat, the theatre manager and one of the partners of the theatre complex.

7G Brindavan Colony was re-released on 22 September 2023.

=== Critical reception ===
Shobha Warrier of Rediff.com said that "Selvaraghavan has once again displayed his skill making a movie that is touching without being mushy, and believable because of its realism". Malini Mannath of Chennai Online wrote "[..] in '7/g....' missing is the crisp narration and focus. The screenplay meanders, the narrative style is jerky, the situations seeming like they were thrust into the narration as after-thoughts. Also the hangover of his earlier films is clearly evident". Sify wrote, "Unlike other contemporary film makers running after superstars and making formula films, Selvaraghavan pushes the cinematic envelope and brings savvy freshness to the form, hitherto unexplored". Malathi Rangarajan of The Hindu wrote, "Comparisons are odious and at the same time inevitable. Especially when the director's earlier film had been a carefully planned and commendably executed one". Idlebrain.com gave 7G Brindavan Colony a rating of three-and-three quarters out of five and noted that "Doing a tragic climax and making it commercially acceptable is one hell of a task. And Sri Raghava succeeded in it".

=== Box office ===
7/G Rainbow Colony opened in 92 screens and expanded to 118 prints. Made on a budget of ₹3 crore, it turned profitable yielding a distributor's share of ₹10 crore. 7G Brindavan Colony opened in 35 screens and expanded to over 80 prints. It proved to be extremely profitable, minting a distributor's share of ₹6-8 crore.

== Accolades ==
| Event | Category | Recipient | Ref. |
|---|---|---|---|
| Filmfare Awards South | Best Music Director (Tamil) | Yuvan Shankar Raja | |
| Filmfare Awards South | Best Male Debut (South) | Ravi Krishna | |
| CineMAA Awards | Best Story Writer | Sri Raghava | |
| Santosham Film Awards | Best Debut Actor | Ravi Krishna | |
| Santosham Film Awards | Best Musical hit album | Yuvan Shankar Raja | |
| 35th Annual AP Cinegoers Association Awards | Best Debut hero | Ravi Krishna | |
| 35th Annual AP Cinegoers Association Awards | Best Comedian (Special Commendation) | Suman Setty | |

== Other remakes ==
7/G Rainbow Colony was remade in Kannada as Gilli (2009), in Bangla as Prem Aamar (2009), and in Hindi as Malaal (2019).
