= Ramji (cinematographer) =

Indian film cinematographer (born 1961)

- Born: 31 July 1961 (age 65); Chennai, Tamil Nadu, India
- Occupation: Cinematographer
- Years active: 1997-present

Ramji (born 31 July 1961) is an Indian film cinematographer, who has worked in Tamil, Hindi and Malayalam languages. He is well known for his association with directors such as Sangeeth Sivan, Ameer Sultan, Selvaraghavan and Mohan Raja.

== Career ==
He initially worked as an associate to cinematographer P. C. Sreeram.

== Filmography ==
=== Feature films ===
Year	Film	Language	Notes
1997	Vallal	Tamil	
1999	Don Bosco	Malayalam	
2000	Snehapoorvam Anna	Malayalam	
2001	Dumm Dumm Dumm	Tamil	
2002	Mounam Pesiyadhe	Tamil	
2003	Chura Liyaa Hai Tumne	Hindi	
2005	Raam	Tamil	
2005	Kyaa Kool Hain Hum	Hindi	
2006	Apna Sapna Money Money	Hindi	
2007	Paruthiveeran	Tamil	
2009	Ek: The Power of One	Hindi	
2010	Aayirathil Oruvan	Tamil	
2010	Click	Hindi	
2011	Mayakkam Enna	Tamil	
2013	Irandaam Ulagam	Tamil	
2015	Thani Oruvan	Tamil	
2017	Velaikkaran	Tamil	
2019	Oththa Seruppu Size 7	Tamil	
2020	Ponmagal Vandhal	Tamil	
2021	Laabam	Tamil	
2023	Kannagi	Tamil	
2026	7/G Rainbow Colony 2 †	Tamil	

=== Webseries ===
Year	Film	Language	Notes
2023	Ayali	Tamil	

=== Short films ===
Year	Film	Language
1997	Manickan	Tamil
1998	Oru Yathra	Malayalam
