= Selvaraghavan =

Indian actor and film director

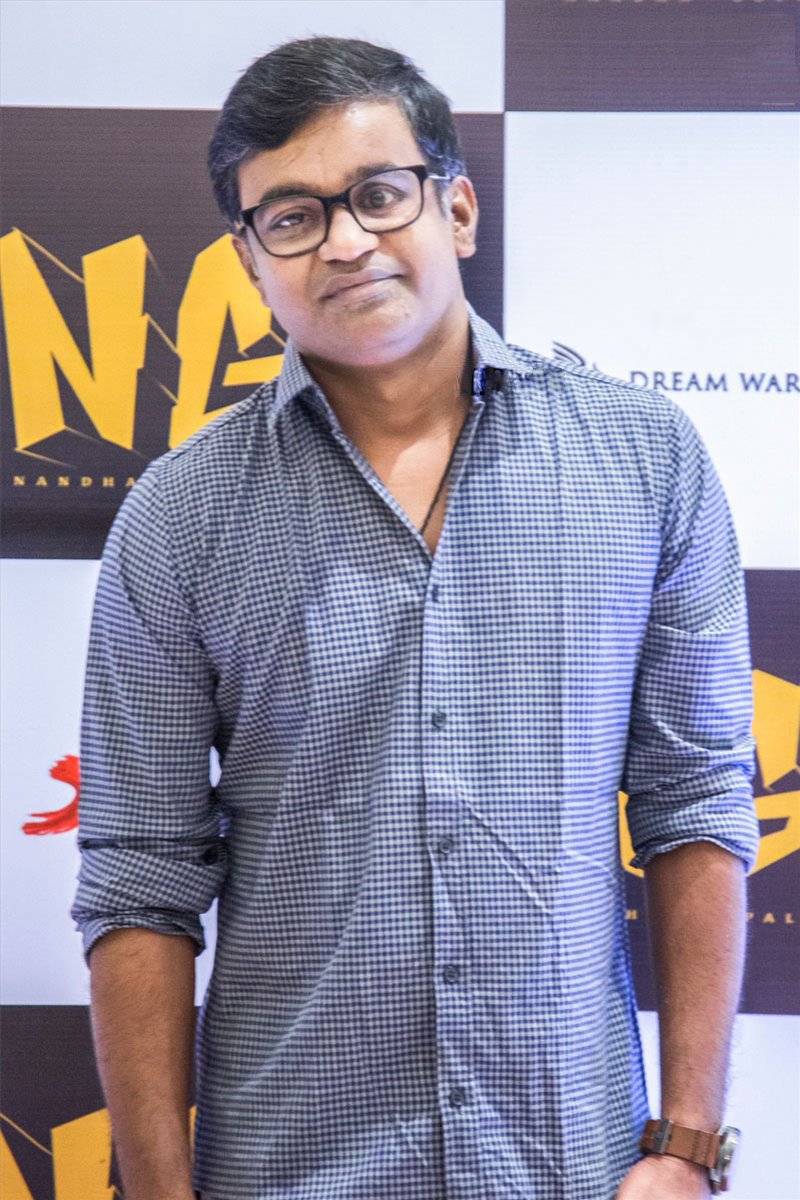
- Selvaraghavan in 2019
- Born: Selvaraghavan Kasthuri Raja; 5 March 1977 (age 49); Theni, Tamil Nadu, India
- Occupations: Film director, Screenwriter, Actor
- Years active: 2003–present
- Spouses: Sonia Agarwal (m. 2006; div. 2010); Gitanjali Raman (m. 2011)
- Children: 3
- Father: Kasthuri Raja
- Relatives: Dhanush (brother)
- Family: See Kasthuri Raja family

Selvaraghavan (born 5 March 1977) is an Indian film director, screenwriter, and actor who has directed and acted predominantly Tamil films and few Telugu films credited himself as Sri Raghava. He had his directorial debut with Thulluvadho Ilamai (2002). Still, his father is credited for business reasons, which stars his brother Dhanush, Selvaraghavan went on to make a series of romantic drama films with Kadhal Kondein (2003) (also starring Dhanush) and 7G Rainbow Colony (2004) before also venturing into coming-of-age films Pudhupettai (2006) and Mayakkam Enna (2011), both starring Dhanush. He has also ventured into making science fiction and fantasy films, such as depicting a fantasy Chola kingdom in Aayirathil Oruvan (2010) and a parallel universe in Irandam Ulagam (2013). He has been critically acclaimed for his directorial skills. He made his film acting debut in the 2022 film Beast.

== Early life ==
Selvaraghavan was born to Tamil film director Kasthuri Raja and Vijayalakshmi on 5 March 1975. He has a brother, Dhanush, who is an actor, and two sisters, who are both doctors. In his youth, one of his eyes was removed after he developed retinal cancer.

Despite coming from a family from the film industry, Selvaraghavan and his sisters were persuaded by their parents to seek a career with an academic background. He subsequently went on to attain a B.E. in Mechanical Engineering, though his exam performances were unremarkable and he acknowledges he was "never going to become one of the best". During his studies, he engaged part-time in different career paths in a process he describes as "soul-searching", before finding satisfaction as a writer. After he graduated in 1997, he approached producers to fund his screenplay writing, but was unsuccessful and often remained at home as an unemployed graduate.

== Personal life ==
On 15 December 2006, he married actress Sonia Agarwal, with whom he had previously worked with on three films. After their two-year marriage, Sonia Agarwal and Selvaraghavan filed for divorce with mutual consent in a Chennai family court on 9 August 2009.

Selvaraghavan married Gitanjali Raman on 19 June 2011, daughter of former Advocate General of Tamil Nadu P. S. Raman. Gitanjali had worked as his assistant director in Mayakkam Enna. The couple have a daughter named Leelavathi born on 20 January 2012, and a son born on 7 October 2013 named Omkar. The couple had their third child, a baby boy on 7 January 2021 who they named Rishikesh.

== Career ==
=== 2002–2004 ===
His family faced financial pressures in the early 2000s with his father being out of work, and subsequently they decided to put their remaining earnings into a venture titled Thulluvadho Ilamai (2002), which Selvaraghavan had written. Featuring his brother Dhanush in his first role, alongside Sherin and Abhinay, the film told the coming-of-age story of six high school students and featured a hit soundtrack by Yuvan Shankar Raja. After taking a small opening, the film began to get teen audiences to cinema halls for its adolescent themes, while also being publicised in quarters as a "soft porn" film. It subsequently went on to become a sleeper hit and won positive reviews from critics for breaking the stereotypes of Tamil films. After release, Selvaraghavan stated that he had also directed the film, but was forced to credit his more established film-maker father Kasthuri Raja as the sole director, in order to help the project find a distributor.

Following the success of the previous film, the team chose to collaborate again with the psychotic romantic thriller Kaadhal Kondein (2003), credited as Selvaraghavan's first film. The venture, produced by his home production, also marked the first collaboration of Selvaraghavan with cinematographer Arvind Krishna, whom he would later associate with regularly. Selvaraghavan had written the script for the film in the late 1990s and had first narrated the story to Dhanush in their shared bedroom at home, before asking him to play the lead role of Vinod after the success of Thulluvadho Illamai. The story explores the mind of a youth who is mentally and physically abused in his childhood. The lack of a mother's love haunts the protagonist throughout the film as the girl of his infatuation is killed. Becoming a psychopath, he desperately tries to woo his newly found lady love and his efforts culminate in a thrilling climax. The film opened in July 2003 to unanimously positive reviews, with a reviewer from The Hindu noting: "his story, screenplay, dialogue and direction are focused and hit the bull's eye straightway — hardly missing the mark." The film subsequently went on to become a blockbuster and provided career breakthroughs for both Selvaraghavan and Dhanush in the Tamil film industry. Since its release, the film has been remade into several Indian languages, while Selvaraghavan was briefly associated with the Hindi remake to be produced by Boney Kapoor in 2004, but the project did not eventually materialise.

Selvaraghavan's next venture was another juvenile love story, the bilingual 7G Rainbow Colony, which saw him collaborate with Yuvan Shankar Raja and Arvind Krishna again. He revealed that the film's inspiration came from his college days when he had been fascinated with a Punjabi girl called Ruchika, during his education in KK Nagar. He based several of the scenes on real-life happenings with his friends, revealing that the film was "75% biographical" and the lead character was an "average guy" like himself, who "no one would make a film on". He cast Ravi Krishna, son of the film's producer A. M. Rathnam, in the leading role after a successful screen test while choosing to retain Sonia Agarwal as the lead actress, due to her Punjabi origin. The film opened in October 2004 to positive reviews, with a critic from Sify.com noting: "Unlike other contemporary film-makers running after superstars and making formula films, Selvaraghavan pushes the cinematic envelope and brings savvy freshness to the form, hitherto unexplored". Another reviewer from Rediff.com added: "Selvaraghavan has once again displayed his skill making a movie that is touching without being mushy, and believable because of its realism", noting that "7G Rainbow Colony remains with you, disturbs you and lingers like the glowing embers of a fire long burnt." Consequently, the film and its Telugu version went on to become amongst the most profitable films of the year. Selvaraghavan later committed to begin work on a Hindi version of the film starring Vivek Oberoi in 2007, but the venture subsequently did not materialise. While making 7G Rainbow Colony, Selvaraghavan began pre-production work on a gangster film titled Pudhupettai – unrelated to his later film – and planned to cast Suriya, Dhanush, Silambarasan, Jayam Ravi, Ravi Krishna and Genelia D'Souza in the lead roles. The film however did not develop into production.

In 2004, he began pre-production on another gangster film titled Kasimedu for producer Salem A. Chandrasekharan, which would feature Ajith Kumar, Dhanush and Bharath in the leading roles. The film was later cancelled, and the director became involved in a legal tussle in 2010 for failing to return his advance payments for the project. He later also tried to make the film during 2005 with Vijay in the lead role for producer Ramesh Babu, with the producer again bringing up legal proceedings in late 2016 about the failure to return an advance. Likewise, another project titled Doctors featuring Dhanush and Sonia Agarwal was shelved after a photo shoot had been held.

=== 2006–2008 ===
The following year, he began work on a different gangster film titled Oru Naal Oru Kanavu for Lakshmi Movie Makers with Dhanush and Sonia Agarwal, based on the gang culture of North Chennai. The title was later changed to Pudhupettai (2006), with Sneha also selected to play the role of prostitute. Featuring acclaimed technical work by Yuvan Shankar Raja and Arvind Krishna again, the film told the story of a slum kid's growth into a notorious gangster. Talking about the making of the film, Selvaraghavan called it "an experiment" and stated it had "one of the most complicated screenplays", while revealing he was more nervous with the final product in comparison to his previous ventures. It also became the first Tamil film to be shot in Super 35 mm instead of the Cinemascope format, as well to be released in digital format. The film opened to negative reviews in July 2006, with a reviewer from Sify.com adding it was "heartbreakingly disappointing and is nowhere in the league of his earlier films", citing that it "doesn't unfold quickly and moves at snail pace, puffs and pants with too many characters, subplots and quite long for a gangster genre film". A reviewer from The Hindu also added "Selvaraghavan dishes out a protracted bloodbath and somehow you feel he has let you down", while the critic at Rediff.com stated that "coming from a director like Selvaraghavan, Puthupettai is unbelievable. He loses grip over the plot and the narration goes haywire". It went on to have an average run at the box office despite taking a grand opening, with Selvaraghavan suggesting the excessive bloodshed scenes may have kept family audiences away.

Selvaraghavan then moved on to direct a Telugu film which he had committed to make since 2003 with Venkatesh in the leading role. Titled Aadavari Matalaku Arthale Verule, he wrote the script, taking experiences from life experiences of friends who were unemployed graduates, like the film's main character. Featuring an ensemble cast also including Trisha Krishnan, K. Vishwanath, Swati Reddy and Srikanth, the film marked a move away from Selvaraghavan's hard-hitting films and was a simple romantic drama film. Aadavari Matalaku Arthale Verule opened to positive reviews in April 2007, with critics noting: "Selva reads the safe path in AMAV, and is most likely to emerge with a winner." Another reviewer added: "Selva Raghavan succeeds in touching the right chord by directing a big hero for the first time", adding "he concentrated on entertainment in the first half and mixed strong emotions in the second half to make sure that audience will have certain positive heaviness in their hearts when they leave the theatre." The film went on to gain recognition at award ceremonies the following year, while becoming amongst the biggest commercial successes in the Telugu film industry for 2007.

After the disappointing reception to his previous Tamil film, Selvaraghavan took a sabbatical to plan future projects and set up a production company, White Elephants, along with Yuvan Shankar Raja and Arvind Krishna, whose first project Idhu Maalai Nerathu Mayakkam began filming in November 2006. The team began shooting with Karthi, whose first film Paruthiveeran (2007) was awaiting release, and Sandhya. The film was stalled in early 2007 due to cinematographer Arvind Krishna's decision to leave White Elephants and the project was eventually shelved. In 2008, the screenplay and the story Yaaradi Nee Mohini are both by Selvaraghavan.

=== 2010–2019 ===
Selvaraghavan announced a new film with Karthi and Reemma Sen in the cast, with Ramji replacing regular Arvind Krishna as the cinematographer. The film was titled as Aayirathil Oruvan (2010), and Andrea Jeremiah and Parthiban also were soon after added to the principal cast. Nearly six months after filming began, Yuvan Shankar Raja also left the project after falling out with Selvaraghavan, and was replaced by G. V. Prakash Kumar. After extensive development and pre-production which took four months for scripting, the film started the first schedule in the forests of Chalakudy in Kerala during October 2007. The project developed a reputation for its gruelling shoots, a novel concept in Tamil films, at an early stage of production. Shoots in all regions were tough and demanding for the crew as the film featured more than three thousand junior artistes from a variety of unions across India, with the language barrier becoming a problem. In February 2009, filming was completed after 263 days of shooting; therefore the producers signalled for a summer release, but it was postponed by six months.

The film, an adventure fantasy, tells the story of an archaeologist, a coolie and a member of the army going in search of the archaeologist's father to a ruined city before they stumble upon the lost Chola civilisation and its king and find unexplained links between them and the culture. Uncut, the film was made to run for 220 minutes, but the theatrical release was heavily censored at 183 minutes and upon release in January 2010, the film remarkably gained mixed reviews. Sify.com cited that the film represented "something new in the placid world of Tamil cinema" adding that it "broke away from the shackles of the stereotypes". Selvaraghavan also was praised by the reviewer with claims that "the director transports us to a whole new world and at the end of it all, we are dumb stuck by the visuals, the packaging and the new way of storytelling". Rediff.com gave the film 3.5 out of 5 claiming that viewers should "steel your stomach before [you] watch it" and "regardless of the minor discrepancies, AO is definitely a movie to watch". In contrast, Behindwoods.com gave the film 0.5 out of 5 describing the film as "wildly crass", dismissing that "the underdeveloped script lacks everything – starting from strong plot twists to captive locations to graphics to credibility, above all". The film evoked a strong opening at the box office and gained average collections. Despite the mixed reaction to the film, Selvaraghavan has expressed interest in making a sequel to the film featuring Dhanush in the future.

Selvaraghavan then relaunched his marital drama film Idhu Maalai Nerathu Mayakkam in November 2008 and filming started with a new cast of Dhanush and Andrea Jeremiah in the leading roles. Ramji and G. V. Prakash Kumar had taken over as the cinematographer and music director respectively. The film was described to be a "quick project" with Selvaraghavan and Dhanush's sister Vimalageetha taking up the production reins. However, filming was subsequently stalled for unknown reasons in February 2009. In August 2009, the film was launched again for the third time with a first schedule planned in Hyderabad and Selvaraghavan taking over exclusively as producer. However, the film was yet again abandoned in October 2009. The director had also begun pre-production work on a film featuring Vishal and Trisha Krishnan in the lead roles in late 2008, however, the actor and director called off the project months later after having creative differences.

After discussions which had been ongoing for a year, Selvaraghavan announced a collaboration with Vikram in January 2008 and worked on the film's script for a year during the making of Aayirathil Oruvan. The project, dubbed by the media as Sindubad, finally began shooting in September 2009 in Ladakh, with Swati Reddy signed on as the female lead with Ismail Merchant as music director. Filming continued in caves near the Himalayas with the team facing trouble with the freezing weather conditions, while Selvaraghavan announced that the next schedule would be held abroad in the United States. However, in February 2010, the film was momentarily shelved and the project subsequently never took off again after the producer Singanamala Ramesh walked out. Soon after in June 2010, another project announced by Selvaraghavan, a bilingual featuring Rana Daggubati set in 50 BC, was also postponed after the pair felt it was too early to work on the film. Likewise, another proposed project for producer Ramesh Babu titled Pei Ottum Nilayam, featuring the producer's son Santhosh Ramesh, failed to materialise. In early 2011, Kamal Haasan agreed terms with Selvaraghavan to be the director of the actor's venture Vishwaroopam. Months into the collaboration, he was ousted from the project, with Kamal Haasan unhappy at the director's commitment to the project. Selvaraghavan later noted that he expected creative control of the project, which Kamal Haasan was unwilling to offer him.

After release of Aayirathil Oruvan, Selvaraghavan began work on a fantasy romance script titled Maruvan, which would yet again feature Dhanush and Andrea Jeremiah in the lead roles. Production started in July 2010 and the shoot of the film progressed slowly, with the project undergoing a title change to Irandam Ulagam. However, the film subsequently ran into trouble after Andrea Jeremiah pulled out of the film, citing differences with the director, and Selvaraghavan chose to shelve the project and begin a new film instead featuring Dhanush and Richa Gangopadhyay. The film began production in May 2011 and the entire filming portions were completed within three months. During production, Selvaraghavan announced he would collaborate with Yuvan Shankar Raja again after G. V. Prakash Kumar became busy, but eventually later changed his mind and retained his original choice. The title was confirmed as Mayakkam Enna (2011), and the film depicted the story of an aspiring wildlife photographer and his struggles in life. Selvaraghavan revealed that he drew instances from his and Dhanush's lives and adapted the screenplay to make it applicable to "gen-next" audiences. The film opened in November 2011 to unanimously positive reviews, with a critic from The Hindu noting it is an "electrifying movie that captures the attention of the youth", and that "Selva's narrative style takes the film to a level that caters to all age groups". Sify.com wrote that the film has "simplistic story telling with hard hitting impact" and that "Mayakkam Enna will stay with you long after the lights have come back on", while Rediff noted that if Selvaraghavan "had tightened the second half, we would have had a masterpiece on our hands."

Selvaraghavan then chose to restart work on Irandam Ulagam in September 2011, with a new cast of Arya and Anushka Shetty and began shooting for the film again from the start. Harris Jayaraj was signed on to be the film's composer, associating with Selvaraghavan for the first time, and production was under way in December 2011. The team shot long schedules in Hyderabad and then across Georgia, trying to replicate an imaginary exoplanet which is depicted in the story. The film narrates two love stories taking place in parallel universes and how they come to coincide, with the lead actors both playing double roles. Talking about the film, the director noted that he tried to readdress the problem of the "concept of pure love being lost to today's generation" and incorporated elements of mysticism, Sufism and a Zen feel to the story. By October 2013, the team revealed that all post-production work including computer generated imagery which took months was finally over and the content was locked and ready for release. The cost for the film eventually totalled nearly ₹ 60 crores, becoming the director's most expensive production till date. The film received mostly average reviews from critics upon release. The Hindu wrote: "With just a handful of movies, Selvaraghavan has announced himself a major filmmaker, and it falls on us to look at his latest venture, Irandaam Ulagam, as the (worthy) next installment in a thematically connected oeuvre as well as a (problematic) standalone film. It's a love story without a shred of genuine passion". The Times of India gave the film 2 out of 5 stars and wrote: "The disjointed way in which the scenes play out in this world at times makes one wonder if we are seeing the film version of a feverish dream Selvaraghavan might have had". Sify wrote: "Irandam Ulagam is not everybody's cup of tea, but film is made with a lot of passion and sincerity. However, like all his previous films, this one too is ahead of its time", while The New Indian Express noted: "brilliantly conceived, the film, however, falls short on execution". The high production values meant that the film became a box office failure and the producer suffered heavy losses on investment.

In December 2013, Selvaraghavan began pre-production on a new venture titled Alaivarisai, produced by Varun Manian, which would feature Silambarasan and Trisha Krishnan in the lead roles. The film was put on hold in May 2014, with Manian announcing that Selvaraghavan had to sort out issues with his previous producers PVP Cinemas, before beginning work on the venture. In February 2015, Selvaraghavan announced that he would begin work on the film again with immediate effect and that the project would have new producers in the form of Selvaraghavan's wife Gitanjali and Siddharth Rao. Retitled as Kaan, a photo shoot was held in April 2015 with Silambarasan, Trisha, Taapsee Pannu and Jagapati Babu, before Trisha opted out of the project and was replaced by Catherine Tresa. The film progressed and by July 2015, Selvaraghavan revealed that the film was scheduled to release by December 2015 and that the producers had also planned an international version. In a sudden turn of events in October 2015, Selvaraghavan put the film on hold, stating that financial restraints meant that the project was not viable. In 2016, Selvaraghavan began work on another film Mannavan Vanthaanadi starring Santhanam, which was shelved despite being 80% filmed. Selvaraghavan subsequently began pre-production work on another venture featuring Suriya, Rakul Preet Singh and Sai Pallavi. and at the moment they were filming the project, it was speculated as the revived version of Kaan, but Selvaraghavan stated that it was an original story that required research, dedication, and a proper screenplay as it is not an easy film. NGK was one of the most anticipated movies of the year. It released in 2019 to negative reviews from the critics and audience, alike. The direction, confusing story and screenplay, Sai Pallavi's performance, and editing were highly criticized.

=== 2021–present ===
His long-awaited Nenjam Marappathillai was released in 2021 to positive reviews from the critics and audience, though the predictability and climax of the film were criticized. A gothic horror film starring S. J. Suryah, Regina Cassandra, and Nandita Swetha, it was looked as his comeback, as a director, after the severe backlash to NGK.

Selvaraghavan made his debut, as an actor, with Vijay's Beast, directed by Nelson Dilipkumar. Though it received mixed reviews from the critics, it grossed over ₹300 crore and was a commercial successful. He then followed it up with Saani Kaayidham, co-starring Keerthy Suresh and directed by Arun Matheswaran, of Rocky fame. His performance in the film was highly acclaimed.

His next release as a director, is Naane Varuvean (2022) with Dhanush in the lead. Kalaippuli S. Thanu is producing it under his V Creations banner, and Yuvan Shankar Raja is composing the music for the film, which is his eighth collaboration with Selvaraghavan.

== Filmography ==
- Note: all films are in Tamil, unless otherwise noted.

Key
†	Denotes films that have not yet been released

=== Directorial work ===
Year	Title	Notes
2002	Thulluvadho Ilamai	Uncredited as director
2003	Kaadhal Kondein	
2004	7/G Rainbow Colony	Simultaneously shot in Telugu as 7G Brindavan Colony (credited as Sri Raghava in Telugu)
2006	Pudhupettai	
2007	Aadavari Matalaku Arthale Verule	Telugu film, credited as Sri Raghava
2010	Aayirathil Oruvan	
2011	Mayakkam Enna	Co-Produced with Gemini Film Circuit
2013	Irandam Ulagam	
2019	NGK	
2021	Nenjam Marappathillai	
2022	Naane Varuvean	
2026	Mental Manadhil	Filming
TBA	7/G Rainbow Colony 2	Filming

=== As writer ===
Year	Title	Notes
2008	Yaaradi Nee Mohini	remake of Aadavari Matalaku Arthale Verule
2016	Maalai Naerathu Mayakkam	

=== As actor ===
Year	Film	Role	Notes
2006	Pudhupettai	Mani	Voice role
2013	Irandam Ulagam	House owner	Voice role
2022	Beast	Altaf Hussain	
2022	Saani Kaayidham	Sangaiyyah	Released on Amazon Prime Video
2022	Naane Varuvean	Serial killer	Cameo appearance
2023	Bakasuran	Beema Rasu	
2023	Farhana	Dhayalan	
2023	Mark Antony	Chiranjeevi	
2024	Raayan	Sekhar	
2024	Sorgavaasal	Sigamani "Siga"	
2025	Devil's Double Next Level	"Hitchcock" Iruthyaraj	
2025	Balti	Porthamarai Bhairavan	Malayalam-Tamil bilingual film
2025	Aaryan	Narayanan "Azhagar"	
2026	Manithan Deivamagalam	Raghavan	
2026	Love Oh Love	Inspector Ramachandran	

=== As lyricist ===
Year	Film	Song(s)	Composer
2002	Thulluvadho Ilamai	"Kann Munnae Eththanai Nilavu"	Yuvan Shankar Raja
2010	Aayirathil Oruvan	All songs (except "Thai Thindra Mannae" and "Pemmanae")	G. V. Prakash Kumar
2010	Kutty	"Nee Kaadhalikkum"	Devi Sri Prasad
2011	Mayakkam Enna	"Naan Sonnadhum Mazhaivandhucha"	G. V. Prakash Kumar
2011	Mayakkam Enna	"Oda Oda Dhooram Korayala"	G. V. Prakash Kumar
2011	Mayakkam Enna	"Ennena Seidhom Ingu"	G. V. Prakash Kumar
2011	Mayakkam Enna	"Kaadhal En Kaadhal"	G. V. Prakash Kumar
2016	Nenjam Marappathillai	"Good Bad & Ugly"	Yuvan Shankar Raja
2016	Nenjam Marappathillai	"Kannungala Chellangala (Tribute To Kaviarasar Kannadasan)"	Yuvan Shankar Raja
2016	Nenjam Marappathillai	"Maalai Varum Vennila"	Yuvan Shankar Raja
2016	Nenjam Marappathillai	"En Pondati Oorukku Poita"	Yuvan Shankar Raja
2017	Power Paandi	"Vaanam" (The Life of Power Paandi)	Sean Roldan
2019	NGK	"Pothachaalum"	Yuvan Shankar Raja
2022	Naane Varuvean	"Veera Soora"	Yuvan Shankar Raja
2025	Nenjam Marappathillai (OST)	"Devil's Duet"	Yuvan Shankar Raja
2025	Nenjam Marappathillai (OST)	"Bring it On!"	Yuvan Shankar Raja

== Accolades ==
=== Filmfare Awards South ===
Year	Films	Category	Result
2004	Kaadhal Kondein	Best Director	Nominated
2005	7/G Rainbow Colony	Best Director	Nominated
2007	Pudhupettai	Best Director	Nominated
2010	Aayirathil Oruvan	Best Director	Nominated

CineMAA Awards - 2004

- Best Story Writer - 7G Brindavan Colony

=== Edison Award ===
Year	Films	Category	Result
2010	Aayirathil Oruvan	Best Thriller Film	Won
2023	Beast	Best Supporting Role – Male	Won

=== SIIMA ===
Year	Films	Category	Result
2011	Mayakkam Enna	Best Film	Nominated
