= Arvind Krishna (cinematographer) =

Indian cinematographer, producer, actor

- Born: Arvind Krishna; New Delhi
- Other name: Aravind Krishna
- Occupation: Cinematographer
- Years active: 1992-present

Arvind Krishna is an Indian cinematographer, producer and actor who predominantly works in the Tamil film industry. He is well known for his work in 7G Rainbow Colony (2004) and Pudhupettai (2006).

== Career ==
=== Cinematography ===
His first stint was with P. C. Sreeram, with whom he interned for six years. In this role he assisted him in the cinematography department and worked on several prestigious ad campaigns, television commercials and feature films. He then moved to work independently as a cinematographer. Subsequently, he met film director Selvaraghavan and was his chief camera person for "Kadhal Kondein, 7G Rainbow Colony and Pudhupettai". Gautham Vasudev Menon collaborated with Arvind Krishna on "Pachaikili Muthucharam". Arvind has also worked with Veteran P.Vasu for the film "Kuselan". A.L.Vijay and Arvind worked together on "Poi Solla Porom" (a remake of "Khosla Ka Ghosla").

=== Production ===
In 2012, he produced a TV series called Dharmayutham for Star Vijay.

=== Acting ===
Arvind Krishna was featured in Kamal Hassan's police story "Kurudhipunal" in a much-appreciated role as Dhanush. He also starred in Rajeev Menon's "Kandukonden Kandukonden" as protagonist's best friend. In addition he did a cameo appearance in "Poi Solla Poram" and "Theeratha Vilayatu Pillai".

== Filmography ==
Year	Title	Language	Cinematography	Actor	Notes
1995	Kurudhipunal; Drohi	Tamil; Telugu		Yes	Siva (cameo)
2000	Kandukondain Kandukondain	Tamil		Yes	
2002	Thulluvadho Ilamai	Tamil	Yes		
2003	Kaadhal Kondein	Tamil	Yes		
2004	7G Rainbow Colony	Tamil; Telugu	Yes		
2005	Chakram	Telugu	Yes		
2006	Pudhupettai	Tamil	Yes		
2007	Pachaikili Muthucharam	Tamil	Yes		
2008	Kuselan	Tamil	Yes		
2008	Poi Solla Porom	Tamil	Yes	Yes	Police Officer
2009	Vaamanan	Tamil	Yes		
2010	Theeradha Vilaiyattu Pillai	Tamil	Yes	Yes	Doctor
2010	Baava	Telugu	Yes		
2012	Dharmayutham	Tamil			Producer, Soap opera on STAR Vijay
2013	Thank You	Malayalam	Yes		
2014	God's Own Country	Malayalam	Yes	Yes	
2014	Peruchazhi	Malayalam	Yes	Yes	Guest Appearance
2016	Kanithan	Tamil	Yes		
2017	Nibunan	Tamil	Yes		
2018	Kuttanadan Maarpaapa	Malayalam	Yes		
2018	Mangalyam Thanthunanena	Malayalam	Yes		
2019	90 ML	Tamil	Yes		
2019	Thiravam	Tamil	Yes		Producer and Director, ZEE5 original web series
2021	Nenjam Marappathillai	Tamil	Yes		
2022	CAT	Punjabi	Yes		
2024	Swatantrya Veer Savarkar	Hindi	Yes		
2026	Kadhal Reset Repeat	Tamil	Yes		
