= Yaaradi Nee Mohini =

2008 film by Mithran Jawahar

- Poster
- Directed by: Mithran Jawahar
- Written by: Selvaraghavan
- Based on: Aadavari Matalaku Ardhale Verule by Selvaraghavan
- Produced by: K. Vimalageetha
- Starring: Dhanush; Nayanthara
- Cinematography: Siddharth Ramaswamy
- Edited by: Kola Bhaskar
- Music by: Yuvan Shankar Raja; D. Imman (1 song); Dharan Kumar (2 songs)
- Production company: R. K. Productions
- Release date: 4 April 2008
- Running time: 175 minutes
- Country: India
- Language: Tamil

Yaaradi Nee Mohini (transl. Who are you, beautiful woman?) is a 2008 Indian Tamil-language romantic drama film directed by Mithran Jawahar in his directorial debut. It is a remake of the 2007 Telugu film Aadavari Matalaku Arthale Verule and stars Dhanush and Nayanthara in lead roles, whilst Karthik Kumar, Raghuvaran, K. Viswanath, Karunas, and Saranya Mohan play supporting roles and slightly different climax. The music was scored by Yuvan Shankar Raja.

Yaaradi Nee Mohini was released on 4 April 2008. The film became highly successful at the box office, emerging as one of the highest grossing Tamil films of the year.

== Plot ==
Vasudevan is a youth from a middle-class family. He makes several bids to obtain employment, but all go in vain due to his poor English language skills and inadequate educational qualifications. All his friends become settled in life, but he continues to struggle to find work. Vasu has two faithful friends, Cheenu and Ganesh. His father, who is a teacher, is always critical of him for being an irresponsible person. This adds to his woes.

At this juncture, Vasu glimpses a woman named Keerthi and immediately falls in love with her. He learns that she works for a software solutions firm. Luckily for him, Vasu secures employment at the same firm after completing several interviews. Keerthi eventually turns out to be a short-tempered young woman. On a business trip, Vasu accompanies her and two other colleagues to Australia. There, he reveals his feelings of love for her. She immediately turns him down, saying that she comes from an Orthodox family, and that her marriage has already been arranged with her uncle's son.

A depressed Vasu returns to India thereafter. Unable to see his son in depression, his father decides to meet Keerthi, but she abuses him for recommending his son's love and accidentally slaps Vasu and his father. Later that night, Vasu's father dies of a heart attack. To help change Vasu's mood, Cheenu persuades him to come to his family house in the country. Coincidentally, on the train journey, Keerthi is revealed to be Cheenu's fiancée. However, their grandfather's thoughts of getting them married earlier are put aside because Cheenu and Keerthi leave the house to have their own identities. This causes heartache for their grandfather.

With the passing of a few days, Keerthi and Cheenu's parents decide to get them married to appease their grandfather. After several turns of events, Keerthi realises that she is in love with Vasu instead. Vasu asks her to forget him because he believes that it would create problems in their happy family. Cheenu overhears their midnight conversation. During the wedding, Cheenu tries to force Vasu and Keerthi to confess their relationship to everyone. But when they hesitate to do so, Cheenu stops the marriage himself, by lying to his elders that he has a secret wife in Chennai. When Cheenu comes under fire from his relatives, Vasu tells them the truth and is driven out of the house. He is joined only by the grandma of the house, who agrees to accompany him as she reminds him of his late father.

In time, the rest of Cheenu and Keerthi's family come to stay with him for a few days. But Cheenu's grandfather refuses to enter the house, telling Vasu he is still angry with him and needs time to change himself somehow. The film ends when Vasu and Keerthi become a couple and live together happily.

== Cast ==
- Dhanush as Vasudevan "Vasu"
- Nayanthara as Komalavalli (Keerthi)
- Karthik Kumar as Cheenu
- Raghuvaran as Vasu's father
- K. Viswanath as Krishnamoorthy, Keerthi's grandfather
- Karunas as Ganesh
- Saranya Mohan as Anandhavalli (Pooja)
- Sukumari as Sharadha, Krishnamoorthy's wife
- Rajyalakshmi as Mani
- Vanitha Krishnachandran as Godavari
- Manobala as Balu
- Crane Manohar as a villager
- Nandha Saravanan as a villager
- Rachana Maurya (special appearance in the song "Nenjai Kasakki")
- Japan Kumar (special appearance in the song "Nenjai Kasakki")
- Ragasya (special appearance in the song "Oh Baby")

== Production ==
Mithran R. Jawahar, an associate of Selvaraghavan, made his directorial debut with this film, which is a remake of Selvaraghavan's Telugu film Aadavari Matalaku Arthale Verule (2007), while Jyothika was offered the female lead role, but she opted out of the contract due to her wedding arrangements and plans. Asin was offered the role but didn’t sign the dotted lines due to date clashes with her Bollywood projects. She was later replaced by Nayanthara. The film's original climax was ambiguous whether the lead characters reunite; post-release, it was changed to show them definitively reuniting.

== Soundtrack ==
Yaaradi Nee Mohini

Soundtrack album by Yuvan Shankar Raja
- Released: 9 February 2008
- Recorded: 2007
- Genre: Film soundtrack
- Label: Sony Music
- Producer: Yuvan Shankar Raja

Yuvan Shankar Raja chronology
Vaazhthugal (2008)	Yaaradi Nee Mohini (2008)	Anthu Inthu Preethi Banthu (2008)

The music of Yaaradi Nee Mohini was scored by Yuvan Shankar Raja, who had composed the music for the original film as well. The first release of the soundtrack, released on 9 February 2008, contained five tracks, which were all retained from the original version with the song "Manasa Manninchamma" missing initially. Later, a version of "Paalakattu Pakkathile" from Vietnam Veedu (1970), remixed by D. Imman, was recorded and included in the film; the producers decided to bring out a second release. This release features 16 tracks, including the earlier released five songs, two more versions of the song "Engeyo Paartha" (sung by Karthik and Naveen, respectively), two more remixes of the song "Paalakattu Pakkathile" (remixed by Dharan), the Tamil version of "Manasa Manninchamma", "Penne Ennai Kodu", the song "The Person Is The Loser", which runs during the opening credits apart from four "film score tracks". The lyrics were provided by Na. Muthukumar.

All tracks are written by Na. Muthukumar.

Track listing
No.	Title	Singer(s)	Length
1.	"Engeyo Paartha"	Udit Narayan	5:27
2.	"Oh! Baby Oh! Baby"	Naveen Madhav, Haricharan, Andrea Jeremiah, Bhargavi	5:44
3.	"Oru Naalaikkul"	Karthik, Rita	5:45
4.	"Vennmegam"	Hariharan	4:40
5.	"Nenjai Kasakki"	Udit Narayan, Suchitra	5:11
Total length:			31:02

Second release
No.	Title	Music	Singers	Length
6.	"Penne Ennai Kodu"	Yuvan Shankar Raja	Karthik	4:32
7.	"The Person Is The Loser"	Yuvan Shankar Raja	Yuvan Shankar Raja	2:00
8.	"Palakattu (D.Imman's Mix)"	D. Imman	Haricharan, Suchitra & Vinaya	4:49
9.	"Engeyo Paartha (2)"	Yuvan Shankar Raja	Karthik, Yuvan Shankar Raja	5:20
10.	"Yaaradi Nee Mohini Theme 1 (BGM)"	Yuvan Shankar Raja	Instrumental	0:31
11.	"Yaaradi Nee Mohini Theme 2 (BGM)"	Yuvan Shankar Raja	Instrumental	1:10
12.	"Yaaradi Nee Mohini Theme 3 (BGM)"	Yuvan Shankar Raja	Instrumental	0:33
13.	"Yaaradi Nee Mohini Theme 4 (BGM)"	Yuvan Shankar Raja	Instrumental	0:35
14.	"Palakattu (Dharan's Mix) feat Dr.Burn"	Dharan	Jaidev, Vinaya & Dr. Burn (Rap)	4:56
15.	"Engeyo Paartha (3)"	Yuvan Shankar Raja	Naveen & Yuvan Shankar Raja	5:32
16.	"Palakattu (Dharan's Mix)"	Dharan	Jaidev & Vinaya	5:00

== Release and reception ==
Sify wrote, "If you like feel-good love stories mixed with a lot of comedy and sentiments then, Yaaradi Nee Mohini is an ideal treat for the entire family. All credits go to debutant director Jawahar, Selvaraghavan?s long time associate for remaking his guru?s Telugu super-hit Adavari Matalaku Ardhalu Verule into Tamil. It is a well packaged film that will appeal to a broad spectrum of audiences". Rediff wrote "The movie is another example of a familiar story making a good watch simply because it's been made differently". Chennai Online wrote "Jawahar has tried to retain the essence of the original Telugu film but could not inherit his [mentor's] screenplay mastery . [It is] the same old story of romance and family sentiments, but the treatment and casting is what makes the film tick". Alfredo of Kalki praised the acting but felt the music and cinematography has no life, panned the inclusion of a fight scene as forced while also finding the scenes as predictable, screenplay becoming dull and climax being draggy. It was one of the most successful Tamil films of the year.

== Accolades ==
Dhanush was nominated for the Vijay Award for Best Actor.
