= Kaadhal Kondein =

2003 film by Selvaraghavan

- Theatrical release poster
- Directed by: Selvaraghavan
- Written by: Selvaraghavan
- Produced by: Dr. K. Vimalageetha
- Starring: Dhanush; Sonia Agarwal; Sudeep Sarangi
- Cinematography: Arvind Krishna
- Edited by: V. T. Vijayan
- Music by: Yuvan Shankar Raja
- Production company: R. K. Productions
- Release date: 4 July 2003
- Running time: 165 minutes
- Country: India
- Language: Tamil

Kaadhal Kondein (transl. I Fell In Love) is a 2003 Indian Tamil-language romantic psychological thriller film written and directed by Selvaraghavan, credited as his directorial debut. The film stars the director's brother Dhanush and newcomers Sonia Agarwal and Sudeep Sarangi, while Nagesh and Daniel Balaji play supporting roles. The film, which has music scored by Yuvan Shankar Raja and cinematography handled by Arvind Krishna, was released on 4 July 2003, becoming a critical and commercial success. The film is considered a major breakthrough for Dhanush as it catapulted him into the league of lead actors in the Tamil film industry. Kaadhal Kondein was remade in Telugu as Nenu (2004), in Bangladeshi as Onno Manush (2004), in Kannada as Ravana (2009) and in Bengali as Amanush (2010).

== Plot ==
Vinod, an orphan, has grown up under the care of Church Father Rozario. He is an introvert but a genius. He scores well in his 12th grade exams and gets free admission to one of the top engineering colleges in Tamil Nadu. He is forcibly sent to Madras to study in an engineering college, where he is a complete misfit. Though shunned by the rest of his class, Divya, a fellow student, becomes his best friend, and he gradually warms up to her. Vinod excels in studies, and everyone begins to see him differently. His feelings for Divya soon turn into love, but he realises that Divya considers him only as a friend and learns that she is in love with another classmate, Aadhi.

Divya's father is enraged on learning of her love. He locks her up in her room and prevents her from contacting anyone. Vinod comes and asks to meet her on the pretext of purchasing secondhand clothes for himself. Pitying Vinod, her father allows him to meet Divya. Vinod escapes with Divya and convinces her that she will meet Aadhi in Araku Valley. Vinod has set up a secret place in Araku to execute his plan to woo Divya. He makes her stay with him, while convincing her to stay by talking about Aadhi's arrival. One day, he reveals his past.

In 1995, near the forest of Chilakaluripet, a gang runs a brick factory that employs only child workers. The gang's leader is a ruthless money-lending lady who buys orphans for work. The boys and girls are enslaved under highly inhuman conditions and work for 16 hours a day. Vinod, a 13-year-old-boy, is sold by his uncle and aunt for money after his parents died in an accident. He befriends three boys and one girl of the same age. One day, Vinod tries to inform an officer of the cruelty that the children are exposed to, but the officer later accepts a bribe and leaves. Vinod is then sent to solitary confinement within a metal box under the sun as punishment. Vinod's female friend agrees to the sexual advances made by the owner's husband in exchange for freeing Vinod from the metal box. However, she dies during the sexual assault and the murder is covered up. Weeks later, the boys, led by Vinod, rebel and kill the entire gang. They vandalize the place and escape, following which the government takes over the plant, and all children are admitted into an orphanage run by Rozario.

Divya is touched by Vinod's past. Incidentally, the police and Aadhi arrive at the place. While Vinod was away to get some food, they try to explain to Divya that Vinod is a psychopath, with the evidence of a dead body in his earlier residence. Divya scoffs at their claims, citing his gentlemanly behaviour over the days that she has been alone with him. Vinod, learning that the police have arrived at the scene, begins to indulge in violence. He opens fire, killing a police constable. Forcing them out of their hideout, he evades the police inspector and Aadhi and successfully brings Divya back to their original place of stay. Divya soon identifies the wolf in sheep's clothing. Vinod pleads with her, telling Divya that all he wanted in his life was her presence, but she called him a friend and stated her inability to accept him as her partner for life.

Meanwhile, Aadhi regains consciousness and comes back to attack Vinod and rescue his girlfriend. A violent fight follows, where Vinod treats Aadhi with disdain. The fight culminates with Vinod, Aadhi, and Divya teetering at the edge of a slippery cliff. While Divya clutches a tree bark tightly, Vinod and Aadhi slip out and barely manage to hold either of her hands. Divya is forced to choose between her boyfriend and friend. Aadhi's pleas notwithstanding, Divya does not have the heart to kill Vinod, who smiles at Divya and lets go of her hand, falling to his death. The film closes with a dead Vinod looking up, smiling.

== Cast ==
- Dhanush as Vinod
- Sonia Agarwal as Divya
- Sudeep as Aadhi Kesavan
- Nagesh as Father Rozario
- Srikanth as Divya's father
- Daniel Balaji as the police inspector
- Rambo Rajkumar as Divya's assaulter
- Raviraj as the professor
- Sathyajith as Aadhi's father
- Gowthami Vembunathan as the orphanage caretaker
- Hemalatha as Devi, Vinod's childhood friend
- A. K. Abbas as Vinod's childhood friend

== Production ==
In the late 1990s, Selvaraghavan had written a script and had first narrated the story to his brother Dhanush in their shared bedroom at home, before asking him to play the lead role of Vinod. The film, later titled Kaadhal Kondein, became Selvaraghavan's official directorial debut after he wrote and "ghost-directed" Thulluvadho Ilamai (2002). Abhinay, who was a part of Thulluvadho Ilamai, was to play one of the lead roles but was replaced by newcomer Sudeep from Mumbai. This is the debut film for actress Sonia Agarwal.

== Music ==
Kaadhal Kondein

Soundtrack album by Yuvan Shankar Raja
- Released: 20 March 2003
- Recorded: 2003
- Genre: Feature film soundtrack
- Length: 34:34; 30:18 (OST release)
- Labels: Five Star Audio & Sun Music
- Producer: Yuvan Shankar Raja

Yuvan Shankar Raja chronology
Pudhiya Geethai (2003)	Kaadhal Kondein (2003)	Winner (2003)

For Kaadhal Kondein, director Selvaraghavan and music composer Yuvan Shankar Raja came together again after their earlier successful collaboration in Thulluvadho Ilamai, for which Selvaraghavan worked as a writer. The soundtrack of Kaadhal Kondein was released on 20 March 2003, featuring seven tracks with lyrics written by Palani Bharathi and Na. Muthukumar. The music, especially the film score, received universal critical acclaim, establishing composer Yuvan Shankar Raja as one of the "most sought after music directors" in the Tamil film industry. Cinesouth appreciated the album writing "Self confidence is the most crucial element in success. That's what is seen in these compositions. The success of 'Thulluvatho Ilamai' hasn't made him lose his [Yuvan] balance in any way. He isn't boasting about his musical skills, instead, he merges his music with the film and is bringing out the best in him. These days, even soundtracks of Tamil films are succeeding only rarely. 'Kaadhal Kondaen' can be sure of one thing- music is a big hit".

The song "Kadhal Mattum Purivathillai" is based on "Räven" by the Swedish-Finnish folk band Hedningarna, while "Manasu Rendum" is based on "A Rose in the Wind" by Indonesian singer Anggun. More than a year after the release of the film, an "original soundtrack" was released, that followed the Hollywood-style. It was said to be the first time, that an original soundtrack was released for a film in India as the soundtracks released in India do not contain any film score pieces but full songs that feature in the film itself. The OST of Kaadhal Kondein contains 20 tracks overall, which includes the seven earlier released tracks, four "montage" bit songs, that featured in the film, but not in the soundtrack, and nine pieces from the actual film score, which were titled "Theme Music".

No.	Title	Lyrics	Singer(s)	Length
1.	"Devathaiyai Kandaen"	Na. Muthukumar	Harish Raghavendra	5:11
2.	"Manasu Rendum"	Palani Bharathi	Shankar Mahadevan	6:41
3.	"Nenjodu"	Palani Bharathi	P. Unnikrishnan, Sujatha	6:25
4.	"Kadhal Mattum Purivathillai"	Palani Bharathi	Vijay Yesudas	6:07
5.	"Thottu Thottu"	Na. Muthukumar	Harish Raghavendra	5:16
6.	"18 Vayathil"	Na. Muthukumar	Yuvan Shankar Raja	4:49
7.	"Kaadhal Kondein (Theme Music)" (Instrumental)			1:07

All music is composed by Yuvan Shankar Raja.

Original Soundtrack release
No.	Title	Artist(s)	Length
8.	"Thathi Thathi"	Yuvan Shankar Raja	2:48
9.	"Natpinilae"	Harish Raghavendra	1:19
10.	"Unnai Thozhi"	Ranjith	2:05
11.	"Kai Padamalae"	Ranjith	2:16
12.	"Theme Music 1"	Instrumental	2:42
13.	"Theme Music 2"	Instrumental	2:12
14.	"Theme Music 3"	Instrumental	0:58
15.	"Theme Music 4"	Instrumental	2:05
16.	"Theme Music 5"	Instrumental	2:24
17.	"Theme Music 6"	Instrumental	1:46
18.	"Theme Music 7"	Instrumental	2:29
19.	"Theme Music 8"	Instrumental	4:31
20.	"Theme Music 9"	Instrumental	2:43
Total length:			30:18

== Reception ==
=== Critical response ===
The film opened in July 2003 to critical acclaim and commercial success. A reviewer from The Hindu noted, "[Selvaraghavan's] story, screenplay, dialogue and direction are focused and hit the bull's eye straightway — hardly missing the mark." Malini Mannath of Chennai Online wrote "The film-maker willing to experiment with lesser explored subjects needs to be commended for taking 'the road not taken', and for his efforts to give a different fare to the audience. 'Kadhal Konden' is an engaging entertainer, worth a watch". Visual Dasan of Kalki praised the acting of Dhanush and Sonia Agarwal, Yuvan Shankar Raja's music and the cinematography.

=== Awards ===
Sonia Agarwal won the ITFA Best New Actress Award.

== Remakes ==
Since its release, the film has been remade into several Indian languages; the film was first remade in Telugu as Nenu (2004), in Bangladeshi as Onno Manush (2004), and in Kannada as Ravana (2009), and in Bengali as Amanush (2010). Boney Kapoor bought the rights to remake the film in Hindi with Dhanush intended to reprise his role, but the project did not materialise.

== Legacy ==
The film proved to be a career breakthrough for both Selvaraghavan and Dhanush in the Tamil film industry.

== Bibliography ==
- Dhananjayan, G. (2011). The Best of Tamil Cinema, 1931 to 2010: 1977–2010. Galatta Media. OCLC 733724281.
