= Pudhupettai =

2006 film by K. Selvaraghavan

- Film poster
- Directed by: Selvaraghavan
- Screenplay by: Selvaraghavan; Balakumaran (Dialogue)
- Story by: Selvaraghavan
- Produced by: K. Muralidharan; V. Swaminathan; G. Venugopal
- Starring: Dhanush; Sonia Agarwal; Sneha
- Cinematography: Arvind Krishna
- Edited by: Kola Bhaskar
- Music by: Yuvan Shankar Raja
- Production company: Lakshmi Movie Makers
- Release date: 26 May 2006
- Running time: 179 minutes
- Country: India
- Language: Tamil

Pudhupettai (transl. New Hood) is a 2006 Indian Tamil-language crime action film written and directed by Selvaraghavan starring his brother Dhanush in the lead role, while Sonia Agarwal and Sneha play supporting roles. It follows the story of a slum-dwelling student from Pudhupettai who becomes a dreaded gangster in North Chennai as a means of survival.

The music was composed by Yuvan Shankar Raja with cinematography by Arvind Krishna and editing by Kola Bhaskar.

== Plot ==
A man is shown, inside a jail cell, shouting that he is scared and that nobody is there. He introduces himself as Kokki Kumar and continues telling his story as he is shown talking alone inside the cell.

Kumar is a secondary school student living in the slums of Pudhupettai. After coming home from the movie theater one day, he sees his mother's dead body and his father with a bloodied aruval. She was killed by his father, following an argument. After overhearing a conversation between his father and his friend about their plan to kill him, too, as he is a witness, Kumar flees from home. Homeless, he resorts to begging and is arrested on false charges. After being released on bail, he befriends Mani, who works for a gangster named Anbu, who works for the opposition party's leader Thamizhselvan, who is also a criminal. They take Kumar under their wing and give him petty jobs. During a confrontation with rival gangsters led by the ruling party's politician Murthy, Kumar kills Murthy's brother single-handedly with a single punch amidst 100 goons, earning the respect of his gang. Anbu makes him join a gang consisting of professional killers. There, Kumar learns the way of being a killer while surviving attacks from Murthy's men. The gang refuses to help Kumar avoid Murthy's men since their intervention would spark a gang war. Kumar murders several of his opponents singlehandedly, earning respect from the others.

Krishnaveni is a prostitute who works under Anbu. Kumar likes her and asks Anbu to release her. Anbu is shocked at Kumar's audacity and refuses his request. He thrashes Krishnaveni and orders his men to kill Kumar. Kumar approaches Anbu and begs to be pardoned, but when Anbu refuses, Kumar slashes him multiple times and beheads him with his knife.

Thamizhselvan allows Kumar to take over Anbu's business only if he can survive the night from Anbu's men, which he does. After killing his opposition, he lures his father into an emotional trap by telling him that he will give him money and shelter.

Kumar's father agrees, and they take him to a place where an empty grave has been dug out for him, on Kumar's orders. Kumar enacts revenge on his father by having his men bury him alive under Mani's watch for brutally killing his mother. Enraged, Kumar also his men kill his father's friend and a rival politician leader who opposed him. Kumar eventually manages to becomes a feared don in North Chennai after Kumar's mentor Ravi paralyzes Murthy by stabbing him for refusing a truce during which Murthy kills one of Kumar's trusted men and Kumar eventually manages to form his own gang through various murders and serving the people there. Kumar then meets Mani's sister Selvi and forcibly marries her on the eve of her wedding. Mani tries to kill Kumar unsuccessfully and accidentally shoots Ravi dead, he then joins Murthy's gang. Meanwhile, Krishnaveni reveals that she is pregnant with Kumar's child, and Kumar marries her as well.

Mani becomes an informant and testifies in court over Kumar's killings; Kumar threatens Selvi and her mother and thus avoids charges through witness intimidation. Thamizhselvan then gives Kumar a post in the party to prevent him from defecting. Due to his increasing crime record and fear of being killed, Kumar asks for Member of the Legislative Assembly (MLA) seat but is ridiculed by everyone, including Thamizhselvan, and ultimately removed after he threatens to kill the other members. Murthy learns about this and plans to assassinate Kumar and his family. Fearing for their safety, Kumar sends Krishnaveni and their newborn son away, but Murthy's men intercept them, kill her, and take the baby. He requests that Selvi ask Mani for help, but she refuses, revealing her displeasure at how Kumar ruined her life, and she plans to return to her former fiancé. Mani is compassionate enough to return the baby safely to Kumar, but is hanged to death by Murthy's men in return. Kumar then gives the baby to a kindhearted woman without revealing himself as the child's father. The woman is married with two children and earns her living by working as a housemaid. Kumar decides to exact revenge and kills Murthy's henchmen with his knives and gun in his residence, but his right hand is crippled during a fight. Murthy ultimately commits suicide by slitting his own throat with a knife as Kumar is unable to kill him and even refuses to join his party leaving Kumar disheartened as he hugs Murthy's corpse, which is then followed by Kumar's arrest.

In the present day, the police and prison wardens come to retrieve Kumar from his cell, with him under the impression that he is to be hanged and Kumar reminisces about Krishnaveni, Mani, Selvi, his parents, his friends, acquaintance, Murthy and the people whom he killed. However, in the epilogue, it is revealed that the incumbent Chief Minister arranged Kumar's release and named him an MLA candidate in the following election. Kumar praises Murthy and ironically states that he would have killed the people responsible for Murthy's death had India not been Mahatma Gandhi's birthplace.

In the epilogue, it is revealed that Kumar served three times as an MLA and twice as the Finance Minister of Tamil Nadu, but despite his political growth, he still could not find his son. Thamizhselvan retired from politics and settled abroad with his daughter and grandchildren. Selvi had married her former fiancé, who went missing two months later, and then she had been committed to a mental asylum.

== Cast ==
- Dhanush as 'Kokki' Kumar
- Sonia Agarwal as Selvi
- Sneha as Krishnaveni
- Azhagam Perumal as Thamizhselvan
- Bala Singh as Anbu
- Prudhvi Raj as Murthy
- Nitish Veera as Mani
- Munnar Ramesh as Sekar, Kumar's father
- Thennavan as Selvam
- Bharathi Mani as Chief Minister
- Murugadoss as Anbu's henchman who sides with Kokki Kumar
- Vijay Sethupathi as Anbu's henchman who sides with Kokki Kumar
- Sai Dheena as Anbu's henchman
- Pudhupettai Suresh as Ravi, Anbu's henchman who is Kokki Kumar's mentor and eventually sides with him
- Jai as Anbu's henchman
- Pasi Sathya as the woman who adopts Kumar's baby

== Production ==
Selvaraghavan originally intended to make a film titled Oru Naal Oru Kanavu for Lakshmi Movie Makers, but shelved the venture (Note: Later the venture was restart with Fazil instead of Selvaraghavan. Sonia Agarwal was retained from the original cast, while Srikanth replaced Dhanush. Oru Naal Oru Kanavu was released in 2005.), and continued working with the same producers and cast as the earlier film, consisting of Dhanush, Sonia Agarwal and Sneha. R. K. Suresh was cast in a minor role as a criminal, but his father made him back out of the film. This film marked the first major appearance of actor Vijay Sethupathi, prior to his role in Thenmerku Paruvakaatru.

The film was launched on 6 March 2005, with Aravind Krishna as its cinematographer. Selvaraghavan first approached Harris Jayaraj to compose the music, but he refused as he felt it was not his type of genre. After his refusal, Selvaraghavan finalized Yuvan Shankar Raja as the composer.

Selvaraghavan called the film "an experiment" and stated it had "one of the most complicated screenplays", while revealing he was more nervous about the final product than his previous ventures. It was also the first Tamil film to be shot in Super 35 mm instead of the Cinemascope format, as well as the first to be released in digital format.

In March 2006 a trailer of Pudhupettai was attached to screenings of Pattiyal, and audiences noticed numerous similarities between the films. It was later reported that Pudhupettai was being delayed as Selvaraghavan was reworking the film to avoid comparisons with Pattiyal.

== Music ==
Yuvan Shankar Raja and Selvaraghavan renewed their association with this film, who had earlier teamed up to create music for the films Thulluvadho Ilamai (2001), Kaadhal Kondein (2004) and 7/G Rainbow Colony (2005). Both the soundtrack and score were composed in Thailand, where Yuvan Shankar Raja worked with the Chao Phraya Symphony Orchestra of Bangkok.

The soundtrack was released on 15 December 2005. The lyrics were written by Na. Muthukumar, who had previously written the lyrics for Selvaraghavan's earlier films.The album received critical acclaim towards listeners.

The song "Enga Yeriya" incorporates elements of the songs "Kunguma Pottin Mangalam" from the 1968 film Kudiyiruntha Kovil, composed by M. S. Viswanathan and "Tharaimel Pirakka" from the 1964 film Padagotti, composed by Viswanathan-Ramamoorthy.

Track listing
No.	Title	Singer(s)	Length
1.	"Pudhupettai Main Theme: Survival Of The Fittest"	Instrumental	2:51
2.	"Peek Into Assassin's Life: Neruppu Vaayinil"	Kamal Haasan	5:01
3.	"Our Story: Enga Yeriya"	Dhanush, Premji Amaran, Yuvan Shankar Raja, Raju Krishnamurthy	5:19
4.	"Selling Dope: The Beginning"	Instrumental	2:52
5.	"It All Comes Down To This!: Oru Naalil" (not featured in the film)	Yuvan Shankar Raja	6:25
6.	"Going Thru Emotions!: Prelude"	Instrumental	3:17
7.	"Gangster's Marriage Party: Pul Pesum Poo Pesum"	Vijay Yesudas, Tanvi Shah, Premji Amaran, Yuvan Shankar Raja	5:26
8.	"Night Life: Varriyaa"	Narayan, Naveen Madhav, Ranjith, Vasu	3:28
9.	"Clash Of The Titans: The War Cry"	Instrumental	3:44
10.	"Oru Naalil: Composer's Dream Mix" (not featured in the film)	Yuvan Shankar Raja; Remixed by DJ Rafiq	5:23
Total length:			28:02

== Reception ==
=== Critical reception ===
A reviewer from Sify said the film was "heartbreakingly disappointing and is nowhere in the league of [Selvaraghavan's] earlier films", and that it "doesn't unfold quickly and moves at snail pace (sic), puffs and pants with too many characters, subplots and (is) quite long for a gangster genre film". A reviewer from The Hindu wrote, "Selvaraghavan dishes out a protracted bloodbath and somehow you feel he has let you down", while the critic at Rediff.com stated that "coming from a director like Selvaraghavan, Puthupettai is unbelievable. He loses grip over the plot and the narration goes haywire". Lajjavathi of Kalki praised Balakumaran's short dialogues, Kola Bhaskar's sharp editing, Aravind Krishna's cinematography adding new dimension to the film while also praising Yuvan's music as new experience but felt his score resembled western cinema which was minus and felt Dhanush's physique was unsuitable for gangster's role and called scenes of Sonia Agarwal as forced and concluded saying it is true that Selvaraghavan wants to move Tamil cinema to foreign films but for that, 'making' alone is not enough. G. Ulaganathan of Deccan Herald praised Dhanush's acting but felt he looked "unconvincing" and "out of frame" as Kokki Kumar and also praised Agarwal's acting and Yuvan Shankar Raja's score.

=== Box office ===
Pudhupettai took the best ever opening for a Selvaraghavan film at the time, netting nearly ₹27.55 lakh (US$29,000) from five Chennai screens in three days, including ₹9.8 lakh (US$10,000) from Sathyam Cinemas. However, by July 2006, the film's performance had dipped, with Malathi Rangarajan blaming it on the violent content and audience's inability to accept Dhanush's character being too "heartless" and "self-centred" to be considered a hero.

== Legacy ==
Despite its average performance during its initial theatrical release, Pudhupettai attained cult status in subsequent years. 10 years after its release, critic Baradwaj Rangan retrospectively praised the film, stating that "Ten years on, we still haven't seen another film so unapologetic about the truth that crime does pay." Dhanush made a cameo appearance in the 2015 film Vai Raja Vai directed by his then wife Aishwarya, reprising his role of Kokki Kumar. The dialogue "Kadavul Irukaan Kumaru" (God is there, Kumar) inspired the title of a 2016 film. In 2024, Selvaraghavan announced a sequel. The song "Oru Naalil" was re-used by Yuvan in Star (2024).
