= List of awards and nominations received by Yuvan Shankar Raja =

List of awards won by Yuvan Shankar Raja
Awards & Nominations
Awards	Won	Nominated
Ananda Vikatan Cinema Awards	3	3
Big FM Tamil Entertainment Awards	3	3
Cyprus International Film Festival	1	1
Edison Awards	0	1
Filmfare Awards South	2	11
Isaiyaruvi Tamil Music Awards	6	6
IIFA Utsavam	0	1
Mirchi Music Awards South	5	5
Norway Tamil Film Festival Awards	1	1
Osaka Asian Film Festival	1	1
South Indian International Movie Awards	0	4
Santosham Film Awards	1	1
Tamil Nadu State Film Awards	2	2
Vijay Awards	3	11
Vijay Music Awards	4	11
- Total number of wins and nominations
Totals	41	72
- Footnotes

Yuvan Shankar Raja is a composer and playback singer, particularly in the Tamil and Telugu industries. His compositions have earned him numerous accolades, including Filmfare Awards, Tamil Nadu State Film Awards, Vijay Awards, and Mirchi Music Awards. Yuvan is the youngest recipient of the Filmfare Best Music Director award, winning it at the age of 25. He received an honorary doctorate in 2022.

== Honorary ==
Year	Award	Honouring body	Ref.
2018	Kalaimamani	Government of Tamil Nadu	
2022	Honorary Doctorate	Sathyabama Institute of Science and Technology	

=== Other Honorary Awards ===
Year	Award	Honouring body	Ref.
2019	M.S. Viswanathan Gold Mic Award for Excellence in Music	Behindwoods Gold Mic Music Awards	
2024	SPB Gold Mic Award for Excellence in Indian Music	Behindwoods Gold Mic Music Awards	

== Film awards and nominations ==
=== Ananda Vikatan Cinema Awards ===
Year	Category	Nominee / work	Result	Ref.
2007	Best Composer of the Year	Kattradhu Thamizh and Paruthiveeran	Won	
2009	Best Male Playback Singer of the Year	"Neethane" from Sarvam	Won	
2019	Best Composer of the Year	Super Deluxe and Peranbu	Won	
2024	Best music director	Star, Garudan and GOAT	Nominated	
2024	Best music director (Background Score)	Star, Garudan and GOAT	Nominated	

=== Big FM Tamil Entertainment Awards ===
Year	Category	Nominee / work	Result	Ref.
2011	Most Entertaining Music Director of the Year	Paiyaa	Won	
2012	Big Tamil Melody Award for Most popular composer-director	Yuvan Shankar Raja	Won	
2012	Big Tamil Melody Award for Best Background Score	Aaranya Kaandam	Won	

=== Behindwoods Gold Medals ===
Year	Category	Nominee / work	Result	Ref.
2022	Best Song of the Decade	Rowdy Baby from Maari 2	Won	

=== Cyprus International Film Festival ===
Year	Category	Nominee / work	Result
2006	Best Musical Score	Raam	Won

=== Edison Awards ===
Year	Category	Nominee / work	Result
2014	Best Playback Singer – Male	"Kadal Raasa Naan" from Maryan	Nominated

=== Filmfare Awards South ===
Year	Category	Nominee / work	Result	Ref.
2004	Best Music Director – Tamil	7G Rainbow Colony	Won	
2007	Best Music Director – Tamil	Paruthiveeran	Nominated	
2007	Best Music Director – Telugu	Aadavari Matalaku Ardhalu Verule	Nominated	
2008	Best Music Director – Tamil	Yaaradi Nee Mohini	Nominated	
2009	Special Jury Award	Oy!	Won	
2010	Best Music Director – Tamil	Paiyaa	Nominated	
2010	Best Music Director – Tamil	Naan Mahaan Alla	Nominated	
2010	Best Male Playback Singer – Tamil	"Iragai Pole" from Naan Mahaan Alla	Nominated	
2013	Best Male Playback Singer – Tamil	"Kadal Rasa" from Maryan	Nominated	
2018	Best Music Director – Tamil	Pyaar Prema Kaadhal	Nominated	
2023	Best Music Director – Tamil	Love Today	Nominated	

=== Isaiyaruvi Tamil Music Awards ===
Year	Category	Nominee / work	Result	Ref.
2007	Album of the Year	Paruthiveeran	Won	
2007	Best Folk Song of the Year	"Oororam Puliyamaram" from Paruthiveeran	Won	
2007	Miranda Crazy Song of the Year	"Saroja Saamaan Nikalo" from Chennai 600028	Won	
2008	Sensational Youth Album	Silambattam	Won	
2008	Crazy Song of the Year	"Where Is The Party" from Silambattam	Won	
2008	Best Remix Song of the Year	"Vechikkava" from Silambattam	Won	

=== IIFA Utsavam ===
Year	Category	Nominee / work	Result	Ref.
2017	Best Music Director	Chennai 600028 II	Nominated	

=== Mirchi Music Awards South ===
Year	Category	Nominee / work	Result	Ref.
2009	Best Music Composer of the Year	"Oru Kal Oru Kannadi" from Siva Manasula Sakthi	Won	
2010	Best Album of the Year	Paiyaa	Won	
2010	Mirchi Listeners' Choice – Best Song of the Year	"En Kadhal Solla" from Paiyaa	Won	
2010	Mirchi Listeners' Choice – Best Album of the Year	Paiyaa	Won	
2010	Mirchi Listeners Choice of the Year	"Thuli Thuli" Paiyaa	Won	

=== Norway Tamil Film Festival Awards ===
Year	Category	Nominee / work	Result	Ref.
2022	Best Music Director	Maanaadu	Won	

=== Osaka Asian Film Festival ===
Year	Category	Nominee / work	Result	Ref.
2022	Best Music Director of the Year	Maanaadu	Won	

=== South Indian International Movie Awards ===
Year	Category	Nominee / work	Result
2012	Best Playback Singer – Telugu	"Panjaa" from Panjaa	Nominated
2019	Best Music Director – Tamil	Pyaar Prema Kaadhal	Nominated
2021	Best Music Director – Tamil	Peranbu	Nominated
2022	Best Music Director – Tamil	Maanaadu	Nominated

=== Santosham Film Awards ===
Year	Category	Nominee / work	Result	Ref.
2005	Best Musical hit album	7G Brindavan Colony	Won	

=== Tamil Nadu State Film Awards ===
Year	Category	Nominee / work	Result
2006	Best Music Director	Pattiyal	Won
2010	Best Music Director	Paiyaa	Won

=== Vijay Awards ===
Year	Category	Nominee / work	Result
2007	Best Music Director	Paruthiveeran	Nominated
2008	Best Music Director	Saroja	Nominated
2009	Best Music Director	Siva Manasula Sakthi	Nominated
2009	Favourite Song of the Year	"Oru Kal" from Siva Manasula Sakthi	Nominated
2010	Favourite Song of the Year	"En Kadhal Solla" From Paiyaa	Won
2010	Best Music Director	Paiyaa	Nominated
2011	Best Background Score	Aaranya Kaandam	Won
2011	Favourite Song of the Year	"Vilaiyaadu Mankatha" from Mankatha	Nominated
2012	Best Music Director	Kazhugu	Nominated
2013	Best Male Playback Singer	"Kadal Rasa" from Maryan	Won
2014	Best Music Director	Anjaan	Nominated

=== Vijay Music Awards ===
Year	Category	Nominee / work	Result	Ref.
2011	Best Singer with the Maximum Hits of 2010	Yuvan Shankar Raja	Won	
2011	Best Music Director	Paiyaa	Nominated	
2011	Popular Album of the Year 2010	Paiyaa	Nominated	
2011	Popular Song sung by a Music Director	"En Kadhal Solla"	Won	
2011	Popular Song sung by a Music Director	"Iragai Pole"	Nominated	
2011	Popular Song of the Year 2010	"Thuli Thuli"	Nominated	
2011	Popular Song of the Year 2010	"En Kadhal Solla"	Nominated	
2011	Popular Melody of the Year 2010	"Thuli Thuli"	Nominated	
2011	Mirchi Listener's Choice of the Year 2010	"Thuli Thuli"	Won	
2011	Popular Duet of the Year	"Adada Mazhaida"	Nominated	
2011	Popular Duet of the Year	"Idhu Varai"	Won	

== Other awards ==
Year	Award	Category	Nominee / work	Result	Ref.
2004	Medimix-Dinakaran Awards	Best Music Director	Manmadhan	Won	
2006	Spell Bound Awards	Best Music Director	Vallavan	Won	
2007	Jayam Charitable Trust Film Music Awards	Best Sensational Musician	Yuvan Shankar Raja	Won	
2007	Jayam Charitable Trust Film Music Awards	Best Singer of the Year Special Award	"Arabu Naade" from Thottal Poo Malarum (shared with Haricharan)	Won	
2007	CJA Cine Critics' Award	Best Music Director	Kattradhu Thamizh	Won	
2007	GV South Indian Cinematographers Association (SICA)	Best Music Director	Yuvan Shankar Raja	Won	
2007	Cinema Rasigargal Sangam	Best Music Director	Billa	Won	
2019	BOFTA Galatta Debut Awards	Best Debut Film	Pyaar Prema Kaadhal	Won	
2019	BOFTA Galatta Debut Awards	Best Debut Producer	Pyaar Prema Kaadhal	Nominated	
2025	Indian Streaming Academy Awards	Best Original Soundtrack (Series)	Parachute	Won	

== See also ==
- Yuvan Shankar Raja discography
- List of songs recorded by Yuvan Shankar Raja
