= Paiyaa (soundtrack) =

Soundtrack album by Yuvan Shankar Raja
- Released: 12 February 2010
- Recorded: 2009
- Genre: Feature film soundtrack
- Length: 28:20
- Language: Tamil
- Labels: Think Music; Sony Music India
- Producer: Yuvan Shankar Raja

Yuvan Shankar Raja chronology
Goa (2009)	Paiyaa (2010)	Baana Kaathadi (2010)

Paiyaa is the soundtrack to the 2010 Indian Tamil-language film of the same name, directed by N. Linguswamy and starring Karthi and Tamannaah Bhatia. The soundtrack album originally includes five songs composed by Yuvan Shankar Raja and was released on 12 February 2010. The release coincided with a promotional event held at SPI Cinemas in Chennai.

The soundtrack album was marketed under the Chennai-based Think Music record label, which was founded in 2007, thus becoming their 50th album. During a press conference held by Think Music in mid-March 2010, it was announced that, thanks to the enormous success of the audio, an additional track has been composed by Yuvan Shankar Raja and included in the film at an appropriate place. The new CD including the new track, titled "Yedho Ondru", was released during the release of the film in early April. In 2011, Sony Music India got the rights to the soundtrack.

== Track listing ==
All lyrics are written by Na. Muthukumar.

Paiyaa - Tamil
No.	Title	Singer(s)	Length
1.	"Thuli Thuli"	Haricharan, Tanvi Shah(Humming)	4:49
2.	"Poongatre Poongatre"	Benny Dayal	5:27
3.	"Adada Mazhaida"	Rahul Nambiar, Saindhavi	4:32
4.	"Suthuthe Suthuthe Bhoomi"	Karthik, Sunitha Sarathy(Humming)	5:01
5.	"En Kadhal Solla"	Yuvan Shankar Raja	4:58
6.	"Yedho Ondru" (Bonus Track)	Yuvan Shankar Raja	3:33
Total length:			28:20

Awara - Telugu
No.	Title	Lyrics	Singer(s)	Length
1.	"Chiru Chiru Chiru"	Chandrabose	Haricharan, Tanvi Shah(Humming)	4:49
2.	"Mandaara Poovalle"	Bhuvana Chandra	Benny Dayal	5:27
3.	"Arere Vaanaa"	Vennelakanti	Rahul Nambiar, Saindhavi	4:32
4.	"Chuttesai Chuttesai"	Bhuvana Chandra	Karthik, Sunitha Sarathy(Humming)	5:01
5.	"Nee Yadalo Naaku"	Vennelakanti	Yuvan Shankar Raja, Tanvi Shah(Humming)	4:58
6.	"Yedho"	Rakendu Mouli	S. P. Charan	3:06
Total length:				24:47

== Reception ==
Professional ratings
Review scores
Source	Rating
Behindwoods	2.5/5 stars

The album received positive responses from critics and was successful in the market. The songs were topping the Tamil music charts in the following weeks. The album has reportedly become 2010's biggest selling audio and the top selling ringtone as well. Moreover, as per the report of a national broadcasting agency, the song "Thuli Thuli" has become the first Tamil song to be featured in an all India index of the Top 20 songs on radio for the month of April 2010, indicating this song was played on all Indian FM radio stations more often than any other song in the history of Tamil film music ever. Yuvan Shankar Raja's songs as well as his film score were also often cited to be the biggest plus and the backbone of the film besides playing an important role for the film's success.

== Awards ==
Ceremony	Award	Category	Name	Outcome
2011 Edison Awards	Edison Award	Best Female Playback Singer	Saindhavi	Won
2011 Big Tamil Entertainment Awards	Big Entertainment Award	Best Music Director	Yuvan Shankar Raja	Won
2011 Big Tamil Entertainment Awards	Big Entertainment Award	Best Lyricist	Na. Muthukumar	Won
2011 Vijay Music Awards	Vijay Music Award	Best Music Director (Jury)	Yuvan Shankar Raja	Nominated
2011 Vijay Music Awards	Vijay Music Award	Best Male Singer (Jury)	Haricharan for "Thuli Thuli"	Nominated
2011 Vijay Music Awards	Vijay Music Award	Popular Album of the Year 2010	Paiyaa	Nominated
2011 Vijay Music Awards	Vijay Music Award	Popular Song of the Year 2010	"Thuli Thuli"	Nominated
2011 Vijay Music Awards	Vijay Music Award	Popular Song of the Year 2010	"En Kadhal Solla"	Nominated
2011 Vijay Music Awards	Vijay Music Award	Popular Melody of the Year 2010	"Thuli Thuli"	Nominated
2011 Vijay Music Awards	Vijay Music Award	Popular Duet of the Year 2010	Rahul Nambiar, Saindhavi for "Adada Mazhaida"	Nominated
2011 Vijay Music Awards	Vijay Music Award	Popular Song Sung by a Music Director	Yuvan Shankar Raja for "En Kadhal Solla"	Won
2011 Vijay Music Awards	Vijay Music Award	Popular Male Singer of the Year 2010	Rahul Nambiar for "Adada Mazhaida"	Nominated
2011 Vijay Music Awards	Vijay Music Award	Popular Male Singer of the Year 2010	Haricharan for "Thuli Thuli"	Nominated
2011 Vijay Music Awards	Vijay Music Award	Popular Female Singer of the Year 2010	Saindhavi for "Adada Mazhaida"	Nominated
2011 Vijay Music Awards	Vijay Music Award	Mirchi Listener's Choice of the Year 2010	Yuvan Shankar Raja & Haricharan for "Thuli Thuli"	Won
58th Filmfare Awards South	Filmfare Award	Best Music Director	Yuvan Shankar Raja	Nominated
58th Filmfare Awards South	Filmfare Award	Best Male Playback	Rahul Nambiar for "Adada Mazhaida"	Nominated
58th Filmfare Awards South	Filmfare Award	Best Female Playback	Saindhavi for "Adada Mazhaida"	Nominated
5th Vijay Awards	Vijay Award	Vijay Award for Best Music Director	Yuvan Shankar Raja	Nominated
5th Vijay Awards	Vijay Award	Vijay Award for Best Male Playback Singer	Haricharan for "Thuli Thuli"	Nominated
5th Vijay Awards	Vijay Award	Vijay Award for Favourite Song	"En Kadhal Solla"	Won
Mirchi Music Awards	Mirchi Music Award	Best Album of the Year	Paiyaa	Won
Mirchi Music Awards	Mirchi Music Award	Mirchi Listeners’ Choice – Best Song of the Year	"En Kadhal Solla"	Won
Mirchi Music Awards	Mirchi Music Award	Mirchi Listeners’ Choice – Best Album of the Year	Paiyaa	Won
