= Naan Mahaan Alla (soundtrack) =

Soundtrack album by Yuvan Shankar Raja
- Released: 24 July 2010
- Recorded: 2009–2010
- Genre: Feature film soundtrack
- Length: 24:21
- Language: Tamil
- Label: Think Music
- Producer: Yuvan Shankar Raja

Yuvan Shankar Raja chronology
Thillalangadi (2010)	Naan Mahaan Alla (2010)	Boss Engira Bhaskaran (2010)

Singles from Naan Mahaan Alla
- 1. "Iragai Pole" Released: 24 July 2010

Naan Mahaan Alla is the soundtrack album to the 2010 film Naan Mahaan Alla directed by Suseenthiran and produced by Studio Green, starring Karthi, Kajal Aggarwal, Jayaprakash and Soori. The soundtrack album featured five songs composed by Yuvan Shankar Raja and lyrics written by Na. Muthukumar and Yugabharathi, and was released through the Think Music label on 24 July 2010.

== Background ==
While Suseenthiran earlier worked with V. Selvaganesh for his previous film Vennila Kabadi Kuzhu (2009), he opted for Yuvan Shankar Raja to compose music for Naan Mahaan Alla; he found the background music was crucial in the film's second half, which was the reason for Yuvan's involvement. The film would mark Yuvan's third collaboration with Karthi after Paruthiveeran (2007) and Paiyaa (2010).

The film's soundtrack featured five songs, while only three of them were used in the film in their entirety. The track "Oru Maalai Neram" was excluded from the film; the song was performed by Javed Ali and Shilpa Rao, the latter in her Tamil playback debut. The song "Va Va Nilava Pudichi" is repeated at the end of the album, with singer Rahul Nambiar credited for both. Nambiar, however, stated on his Facebook site that two versions were recorded featuring his and Haricharan's voice, respectively, but that both songs in the album were rendered by Haricharan only and his own version wasn't included at all.

According to Karthi, Yuvan worked for 12 days for the score of the second half, which "hardly has any dialogues", adding that he was the one "who narrates the story in the second half through his music".

== Release ==
The soundtrack album was released on 24 July 2010 at Sathyam Cinemas in Chennai. Besides the film's cast and crew, the event saw the attendance of directors Hari, N. Lingusamy, Vetrimaaran, Vishnuvardhan, Ezhil, music composer Devi Sri Prasad, producers Dayanidhi Azhagiri and Abhirami Ramanathan. The audio CD was unveiled by Hari and received by Lingusamy.

== Reception ==
The song "Iragai Pole" became hugely popular, topping the charts for several weeks. It has been ranked as one of the popular songs of 2010.

=== Critical response ===
Pavithra Srinivasan, in his review for Rediff.com, wrote that "there are many moments when Yuvan slips into "template" mode, when he simply flips out an older tune to suit newer purposes. But there are also moments when he shows his creative side, and those make the entire song light up – Iragai Pole is an example" and called the album as "worth a listen". Karthik Srinivasan of Milliblog wrote "Two super hit soundtrack, in essence".

A reviewer from Sify wrote "Yuvan Shankar Raja's music (Irgai Pole is the pick) and background score is spellbinding." Renju Joseph of News18 wrote "The music by Yuvan Shankar Raja has a feel-good flavour." Malathi Rangarajan of The Hindu wrote "Just four songs—and Yuvan mesmerises! Mostly shot as montages, the numbers keep the tempo intact."

== Track listing ==
Naan Mahaan Alla (Original Motion Picture Soundtrack) track listing
No.	Title	Lyrics	Singer(s)	Length
1.	"Va Va Nilava Pudichi"	Na. Muthukumar	Haricharan	4:47
2.	"Iragai Pole"	Yugabharathi	Yuvan Shankar Raja, Tanvi Shah	5:19
3.	"Oru Maalai Neram"	Na. Muthukumar	Javed Ali, Shilpa Rao	4:46
4.	"Theivam Illai"	Yugabharathi	Madhu Balakrishnan	4:41
5.	"Va Va Nilava Pudichi II"	Na. Muthukumar	Haricharan	4:47
Total length:				24:21

== Accolades ==
Accolades for Naan Mahaan Alla (Original Motion Picture Soundtrack)
Award	Date of ceremony (Note: Date is linked to the article about the awards held that year, wherever possible.)	Category	Recipient(s) and nominee(s)	Result	Ref.
Vijay Music Awards	11 May 2011	Best Song Sung by a Music Director (Jury)	Yuvan Shankar Raja for "Iragai Pole"	Nominated	
Filmfare Awards South	2 July 2011	Best Music Director	Yuvan Shankar Raja	Nominated	
Filmfare Awards South	2 July 2011	Best Male Playback	Yuvan Shankar Raja for "Iragai Pole"	Nominated	
Vijay Awards	25 June 2011	Favourite Song	"Iragai Pole"	Nominated	
