= Biryani (disambiguation) =

Biryani (or biriyani) is a mixed rice dish originating in South Asia.

Biryani or biriyani may also refer to:

- Biriyani (film), a 2013 Indian Tamil-language film
- Biriyani (soundtrack), the soundtrack to the 2013 film
- Biryani (TV series), a 2025 Pakistani television series

== See also ==
- Biriyaani, a 2020 Indian Malayalam-language film
