= Kedi Billa Killadi Ranga (soundtrack) =

Soundtrack album by Yuvan Shankar Raja
- Released: 15 February 2013
- Recorded: 2012–2013
- Studio: Prasad Studios, Chennai; Pinkstone Studios, Chennai
- Genre: Feature film soundtrack
- Length: 20:05
- Language: Tamil
- Label: Sony Music India
- Producer: Yuvan Shankar Raja

Yuvan Shankar Raja chronology
Samar (2012)	Kedi Billa Killadi Ranga (2013)	Thanga Meenkal (2013)

Kedi Billa Killadi Ranga is the soundtrack album to the 2013 film of the same name directed by Pandiraj starring Vimal and Sivakarthikeyan. The film's music was composed by Yuvan Shankar Raja and featured five songs written by Na. Muthukumar and Yugabharathi. The film's music was released under the Sony Music India label on 15 February 2013 to positive reviews from critics and audiences.

== Development ==
Yuvan Shankar Raja composed the musical score and soundtrack for Kedi Billa Killadi Ranga, in his first collaboration with director Pandiraj and also with actors Vemal and Sivakarthikeyan. Being a "youthful, light-hearted romantic comedy", Pandiraj felt Yuvan to be the right fit for scoring the film, as he was a fan of Yuvan's works. The latter accepted the offer despite his busy schedules.

Each songs were in a different flavour. The opening song, "Oru Porambokku" is a kuthu number performed by Silambarasan and Yuvan himself. The song deals with a group of youngsters resolving to quit drinking on New Year's Eve. Pandiraj added, "Most people start drinking due to their peers and this one has the friends cursing that man". Initially, Yuvan wanted Dhanush to record the song with Silambarasan, but the actor's busy schedule in Maryan (2013), resulted in Yuvan recording the vocals himself.

Pandiraj added that Yuvan had composed two songs for the two lead pairs—Vimal and Bindu Madhavi, and Sivakarthikeyan and Regina Cassandra. "Konjum Kili", picturized on the first lead pair, is a folk number sung by Velmurugan, while "Sudasuda Thooral", which was picturized on the second lead, is a melody number on the lines of "Iragai Pole" from Naan Mahaan Alla (2010).

Yuvan initially composed four songs for the film, but as per the director's request, he had composed an additional fifth song titled "Dheivangal Ellam". Pandiraj added that the song will talk about how a father inspires his children, akin to several Tamil songs based on mother sentiment.

== Release ==
The film's music rights were acquired by Sony Music India. The songs "Oru Porambokku" and "Konjum Kili" were released as singles on 23 and 25 January. The audio launch event was scheduled to be held on 6 February 2013 at the Sathyam Cinemas in Chennai. But the event was cancelled owing to a lawsuit filed by R. Jayaraman of RS Infotainment against P. Madan, the film's co-producer, on non-payment of ₹4.25 crore (equivalent to ₹7.2 crore or US$850,000 in 2023) dues for a potential film directed by Gautham Vasudev Menon starring Silambarasan. The songs were directly released to the market on 15 February and was aired live on FM stations that morning.

== Track listing ==
No.	Title	Lyrics	Singer(s)	Length
1.	"Oru Porambokku"	Na. Muthukumar	Silambarasan, Yuvan Shankar Raja	4:28
2.	"Konjum Kili"	Yugabharathi	Velmurugan	4:20
3.	"Sudasuda Thooral"	Yugabharathi	Yuvan Shankar Raja	5:07
4.	"Ulladha Naan"	Yugabharathi	Sathyan	3:14
5.	"Dheivangal Ellam"	Na. Muthukumar	Vijay Yesudas	2:56
Total length:				20:05

== Reception ==
V. Lakshmi of The Times of India wrote "Yuvan Shankar Raja is in his elements throughout this album, and Pandiraj has brought out the best in him. The extensive use of keys and strings, and the folksy touch, give the numbers a new twist." S. Saraswathi of Rediff.com wrote "Yuvan Shankar Raja has scored the music for Kedi Billa Killadi Ranga. Like the movie, the music is also lively and entertaining. Two songs deserve special mention. Oru Porambokku, a song patronising alcohol, sung by young superstar Silambarasan and Yuvan Shankar Raja has become a chartbuster overnight. Also a soft melody Dheivangal Ellaa, a song dedicated to fathers, by Vijay Yesudas has beautiful lyrics by Yugabharathi." A reviewer from In.com wrote "Yuvan Shankar Raja is a major plus for this film as the songs are already chartbusters and created quite a buzz for the film before release. Pandiraj has picturized all the songs well with right backdrop. Background score is neat and helped the film hit the right note."

== Album credits ==
- Music composer and producer: Yuvan Shankar Raja
- Lyrics: Na. Muthukumar, Yugabhararthi
- Singers: Yuvan Shankar Raja, Silambarasan, Velmurugan, Sathyan, Vijay Yesudas
- Live drums and percussions: V. Kumar
- Additional keyboards: Sivaranjan
- String Instruments: R. A. Amalraj
- Nadaswaram: Thirumoorthy
- Ethnic Percussions: V. L. Prasad, Lakshminarayana, Sundar V. Ramana, Raj, Jaicha
- Program manager: V. Karthik
- Program coordiination: A. S. Subbiah
- Recorded at: Prasad Studios
- Recorded by: M. Kumaraguruparan, M. Barani, Prabhakar, Sudhakar
- Mixed at: Pinkstone Studios
- Mixed and mastered by: M. Kumaraguruparan
