= Tanvi Shah =

Indian singer-songwriter

Tanvi Shah தன்வி ஷா
- Born: 1982 (age 43–44); Chennai, Tamil Nadu, India
- Genre: Filmi
- Occupation: Singer-songwriter
- Instrument: Vocals
- Years active: 2004–present
- Website: www.tanvishah.com

Tanvi Shah (Tamil: தன்வி ஷா, born 1982) is an Indian singer, songwriter, and designer from Chennai, Tamil Nadu, India. In 2010 Shah was the first Indian woman to win a Grammy Award for her contributions to the song "Jai Ho" from the film Slumdog Millionaire.

== Early life and career ==
Shah studied Fine Arts and received a master's degree in Ceramics from George Washington University in Washington D.C.

Her first songs with Indian composer and musician A.R. Rahman were "Yakkai Thiri" and "Fanaa" for the 2004 films Aayutha Ezhuthu and Yuva, respectively. The collaboration continued with songs from films Sillunu Oru Kaadhal, Slumdog Millionaire and Delhi-6. Shah has also sung for Yuvan Shankar Raja, Amit Trivedi, and other music directors.

In 2010, she shared the Grammy Award for Best Song Written for Visual Media with Rahman and Gulzar at the 52nd Grammy Awards for the song "Jai Ho", where she wrote the Spanish lyrics.

She was invited to speak at the TEDxSF conference on Global Health on 12 November 2014. In 2025 Shah made her comeback after a period of illness with the song "Baala Kaale", with lyrics in Sinhalese, together with Sri Lanka-based artist Jo Perera.

== Philanthropy ==
Shah is actively involved with the Cancer Institute (WIA), battling cancer herself. She is also involved with Rotary International's End Polio campaign. Together with producer JHawk she donated the song "Zindagi" to the album End Polio Now, which features international artists Itzhak Perlman, David Sanborn, Ziggy Marley, Donovan, Staff Benda Bilili,and more.

== Awards ==
- Grammy Award, Best Song Written for Motion Picture, Television or Other Visual Media for "Jai Ho" (from Slumdog Millionaire), 2010

== Discography ==
=== Film scores ===
Year	Film	Song	Music director	Language	Ref(s)
2004	Yuva	"Fanaa"	A. R. Rahman	Hindi	
2005	Kanda Naal Mudhal	"Pani Thuli"	Yuvan Shankar Raja	Tamil	
2005	Pudhupettai	"Pul Pesum Poo Pesum"	Yuvan Shankar Raja	Tamil	
2006	Ashok	"Mumtaju Mahalu"	Mani Sharma	Telugu	
2006	Sillunu Oru Kaadhal	"Jillendru Oru Kaadhal"	A. R. Rahman	Tamil	
2007	Sivaji: The Boss	"Style"	A. R. Rahman	Tamil	
2008	Jaane Tu Ya Jaane Na	"Pappu Can't Dance"	A. R. Rahman	Hindi	
2008	Saroja	"My Life"	Yuvan Shankar Raja	English	
2008	Slumdog Millionaire	"Gangsta Blues"	A. R. Rahman	English & Hindi	
2008	Slumdog Millionaire	"Jai Ho"	A. R. Rahman	Spanish & Hindi	
2009	Delhi-6	"Dilli-6"	A. R. Rahman	Hindi	
2009	Delhi-6	"Rehna Tu"	A. R. Rahman	Hindi	
2009	Snoop Dogg Millionaire	"Snoop Dogg Millionaire"	Chase & Status	English & Hindi	
2009	Muthirai	"July Madathil"	Yuvan Shankar Raja	Tamil	
2009	Theeradha Vilaiyattu Pillai	"Theeradha Vilaiyattu Pillai"	Yuvan Shankar Raja	Tamil	
2010	Paiyaa	"Thuli Thuli"	Yuvan Shankar Raja	Tamil	
2010	Paiyaa	"En Kadhal Solla"	Yuvan Shankar Raja	Tamil	
2010	Raavanan	"Keda Kari"	A. R. Rahman	Tamil	
2010	Puli	"Power Star"	A. R. Rahman	Telugu	
2010	Naan Mahaan Alla	"Iragai Pole"	Yuvan Shankar Raja	Tamil	
2010	Enthiran	"Boom Boom Roboda"	A. R. Rahman	Tamil	
2010	Goa	"Goa"	Yuvan Shankar Raja	Tamil	
2012	Billa II	"Yedho Yedho Oru Maikam"	Yuvan Shankar Raja	Tamil	
2012	Kadal	"Magudi Magudi"	A. R. Rahman	Tamil	
2013	Biriyani	"Biriyani"	Yuvan Shankar Raja	Tamil	
2013	Arrambam	"Hare Rama Hare Krishna"	Yuvan Shankar Raja	Tamil	
2014	Lekar Hum Deewana Dil	"Mawwali Qawwali"	A. R. Rahman	Hindi	
2014	Lingaa	"Mona Gasolina"	A. R. Rahman	Tamil	
2015	Vai Raja Vai	"Pookkamazh"	Yuvan Shankar Raja	Tamil	
2015	Yatchan	"Konjalaai"	Yuvan Shankar Raja	Tamil	
