= Vijay Award for Best Male Playback Singer =

Award category

The Vijay Award for Best Male Playback Singer is given by STAR Vijay as part of its annual Vijay Awards ceremony for Tamil (Kollywood) films. The award for this category was first given in 2007.

== The list ==
Here is a list of the award winners and the films for which they won.

Year	Singer	Song	Film	Link
2017	Anirudh Ravichander	"Iraivaa"	Velaikkaran	
2014	Pradeep Kumar	"Aagayam Theepidicha"	Madras	
2013	Yuvan Shankar Raja	"Kadal Raasa"	Maryan	
2012	Mohit Chauhan	"Po Nee Po"	3	
2011	S. P. Balasubrahmanyam and S. P. B. Charan	"Ayyayo"	Aadukalam	
2010	Vijay Prakash	"Hosanna"	Vinnaithaandi Varuvaayaa	
2009	Karthik	"Hasili Fisili"	Aadhavan	
2008	Hariharan	"Nenjukkul Peidhidhum"	Vaaranam Aayiram	
2007	Krish	"June Ponal July Kaatru"	Unnale Unnale	

== Nominations ==
- 2007 Krish - "June Ponal July Kaatru" (Unnale Unnale)
  - Balram - "Kaatrin Mozhi" (Mozhi)
  - Haricharan - "Arabu Naade" (Thottal Poo Malarum)
  - S. P. Balasubrahmanyam - "Yaaro" (Chennai 600028)
  - Udit Narayan - "Sahana" (Sivaji)
- 2008 Hariharan - "Nenjukkul Peidhidhum" (Vaaranam Aayiram)
  - Belly Raj - "Kanagal Irandal" (Subramaniapuram)
  - Krish - "Adiye Kolluthey" (Vaaranam Aayiram)
  - Naresh Iyer - "Mundhinam Parthene" (Vaaranam Aayiram)
- 2009 Karthik - "Hasili Fisili" (Aadhavan)
  - Harish Raghavendra - "Nenje Nenje" (Ayan)
  - Krish - "Oru Chinna Thamarai" (Vettaikaaran)
  - Vijay Prakash - "Om Sivoham" (Naan Kadavul)
  - Vijay Yesudas - "Nila Nee Vaanam" (Pokkisham)
- 2010 Vijay Prakash - "Hosanna" (Vinnaithaandi Varuvaayaa)
  - Karthik - "Usure Poguthey" (Raavanan)
  - Haricharan - "Thuli Thuli" (Paiyaa)
  - Roop Kumar Rathod - "Pookal Pookum" (Madrasapattinam)
  - Alphonse Joseph - "Aaromale" (Vinnaithaandi Varuvaayaa)
- 2011 S. P. Balasubrahmanyam, S. P. B. Charan - "Ayyayo" (Aadukalam)
  - Aalap Raju - "Enamo Aedho" (Ko)
  - Haricharan - "Aariraro" (Deiva Thirumagal)
  - Karthik - "Dhimu Dhimu" (Engeyum Kadhal)
  - Velmurugan - "Otha Sollaala" (Aadukalam)
- 2012 Mohit Chauhan - "Po Nee Po" (3)
  - Dhanush - "Why This Kolaveri Di" (3)
  - Gaana Bala - "Nadukadalula" (Attakathi)
  - Haricharan - "Ayyayyo" (Kumki)
  - Vijay Prakash - "Asku Laska" (Nanban)
- 2013 Yuvan Shankar Raja - "Kadal Raasa" (Maryan)
  - A. R. Rahman - "Nenjae Ezhu" (Maryan)
  - Shankar Mahadevan, Kamal Haasan - "Unnai Kaanadhu Naan" (Vishwaroopam)
  - Sid Sriram - "Adiye" (Kadal)
  - Sriram Parthasarathy - "Aanandha Yaazhai" (Thanga Meenkal)
- 2014 Pradeep Kumar - "Agayam Theepiditha" (Madras)
  - Abhay Jodhpurkar - "Vinmeen" (Thegidi)
  - Haricharan - "Sandi Kuthirai" (Kaaviya Thalaivan)
  - V. V. Prasanna - "Koodamela Koodavechi" (Rummy)
  - Vishal Dadlani - "Aathi" (Kaththi)

== See also ==
- Tamil cinema
- Cinema of India
