= Oru Oorla =

2014 Indian film by K. S. Vasanthakumar

- Theatrical release poster
- Directed by: K. S. Vasanthakumar
- Written by: K. S. Vasanthakumar
- Produced by: P.Velusamy
- Starring: Venkatesh; Neha Patil; Indrajit
- Cinematography: Arul Vincent; DS Vasan
- Music by: Ilaiyaraaja
- Production company: Vignesh Productions
- Release date: 28 March 2014
- Running time: 119 minutes
- Country: India
- Language: Tamil

Oru Oorla (transl. In a town) is a 2014 Indian Tamil-language drama film directed by K. S. Vasanthakumar, starring Venkatesh, Neha Patil and Indrajit.

== Plot ==
Theri, an alcoholic after his mother's death undergoes a change as his sister-in-law delivers a girl. He believes that his mother has reborn as his niece. He takes the responsibility of protecting her, but his brother's fight with a sex worker brings tragedy to all.

== Cast ==
- Venkatesh
- Neha Patil
- Indrajit
- Annapoorni
- Naan Kadavul Murali
- Sundar
- Siva
- Iyyappan Kannan

== Soundtrack ==
The music composed by Ilaiyaraaja, who composed the songs after the film was shot.

Song	Singers	Lyrics
Ippadiyum Oruthan Undu	Velmurugan	Mu. Metha
Thaaye Vanthaye	Ilaiyaraaja	Mu. Metha
Thannathaniye	Haricharan	Mu. Metha
Thedi Ennai Kaanave	Senthil Dass	Mu. Metha
Vanathil	Rita	Mu. Metha

== Reception ==
The Times of India gave the film a rating of 2.5 out of 5 stars, praising it for its screenplay, performances, and music while also stating that the cinematography was not up to the mark. Dinamalar praised Venkatesh for his performance in different shades of the lead character, comparing him favourably to Rajkiran. The reviewer also appreciated the cinematography and music.
