= En Kadhal Solla =

2010 song by Yuvan Shankar Raja

Song by Yuvan Shankar Raja (composer and performer)

from the album Paiyaa (soundtrack)
- Language: Tamil
- Released: 12 February 2010
- Recorded: 2009, Kalasa Studios, Chennai
- Genre: Feature film soundtrack
- Length: 4:49
- Label: Think Music
- Songwriters: Yuvan Shankar Raja (music), Na. Muthukumar (lyrics)
- Producer: Yuvan Shankar Raja

"En Kadhal Solla" (transl. To express my love) is a song from the 2010 Tamil film Paiyaa, composed and performed by Yuvan Shankar Raja. The song, with lyrics by Na. Muthukumar, was released as part of the soundtrack album of the film on 12 February 2010. The lover sings desperately to himself unable to express his love, the video is picturized on the lead actors Karthi and Tamannaah Bhatia. The song was a very popular chartbuster, which stayed in the charts up to 10 months, and in the Radio Mirchi charts even one year after its release. The song played a substantial role in the film's success as did other songs from the album.

== Background ==
Director N. Linguswamy at an awards ceremony in May 2011 disclosed that the song was not originally composed for Paiyaa. When composing the songs for this film, Yuvan Shankar Raja disclosed that he also had composed some numbers for a private album, one of them was this song. Linguswamy listened to the song and was so impressed by it that he immediately requested Yuvan to give him the song for the film.

== Awards ==
Award	Category	Name	Outcome
2011 Vijay Music Awards	Popular Song of the Year 2010	"En Kadhal Solla"	Nominated
2011 Vijay Music Awards	Popular Song Sung by a Music Director	Yuvan Shankar Raja for "En Kadhal Solla"	Won
5th Vijay Awards	Favourite Song	"En Kadhal Solla" by Yuvan Shankar Raja	Won
Mirchi Music Awards	Mirchi Listeners’ Choice – Best Song of the Year	"En Kadhal Solla"	Won

== Other versions ==
The songs' tune was later taken by Bangladeshi composer Arfin Rumey who used it as the theme song, "Jole Utho", for the Bangladesh national cricket team. The song was reused in the Kannada remake Ajith (2014) as "Nanna Aaseyanu".
