= Ajith (film) =

- Directed by: Mahesh Babu
- Written by: Mahesh Babu
- Story by: N. Lingusamy
- Based on: Paiyaa
- Produced by: G Prem; Pranav Gowda S
- Starring: Chiranjeevi Sarja; Nikki Galrani
- Cinematography: Mohan
- Music by: Songs: Yuvan Shankar Raja; Score: V. Harikrishna
- Production company: B M R Productions
- Release date: 9 May 2014
- Country: India
- Language: Kannada

Ajith is a 2014 Indian Kannada-language romantic action film written and directed by Mahesh Babu, starring Chiranjeevi Sarja and Nikki Galrani. It is a remake of the Tamil film Paiyaa. G Prem is the producer, with five songs in the music direction of Yuvan Shankar Raja.

The film was released across Karnataka cinema halls on 9 May 2014.

== Plot ==
In Bangalore, Ajith, an unemployed young graduate meets Charulatha and falls in love with her. One day, Charulatha tells Ajith to drop her at her grandmother's house in Mumbai to escape from a forced marriage arranged by her father. During the journey, the duo encounter two gangs after them (one after Ajith and the other gang after Charulatha) for their personal reasons, but Ajith manages to defeat the gangs and unites with Charulatha, who has also fallen in love with him.

== Cast ==
- Chiranjeevi Sarja as Ajith
- Nikki Galrani as Charulatha
- Arav Chowdharry as Baali, a notorious gangster in Mumbai
- Arpit Ranka as Baali's henchman
- Rockline Sudhakar as a Telugu gang member
- Shivamanju as Ajith's friend in Mumbai
- Anand as Anand, Ajith's friend
- Harish Babu as Ajith's friend

Some scenes from the original film featuring the two gangs were reused.

== Production ==
The rights of the film were sold to makers in Kannada for approx ₹20 lakh (US$24,000). While it was earlier said that Purushotham, of Modalasala fame, would helm the project, Mahesh Babu, whose last directorial outing was the Prem-starrer Prem Adda, was confirmed to direct Ajith. Mahesh Babu zeroed in on Nikki Galrani, actress Sanjjanaa's sister as the heroine. The film was launched in January 2013. The shooting began from 12 February 2013. An action shoot was held in Ravi Verma's stunt direction at Hesaraghatta for which Vice Camera was used that gives 1000 frames for an action portion. The shooting was continued in Mysore, going on in Gandhi Square, which is located at the heart of the city. In June the shoot for the songs of the film happened in Bangalore.

== Soundtrack ==
Yuvan Shankar Raja who scored the music for Paiyaa composes the songs of Ajith. All tunes from the original Tamil soundtrack are reused for the Kannada version. The audio was launched on 16 January 2014.

Ajith

Soundtrack album by Yuvan Shankar Raja
- Released: 16 January 2014
- Genre: Feature film soundtrack
- Language: Kannada
- Label: Anand Audio

No.	Title	Lyrics	Singer(s)	Length
1.	"Suthade Suthade Bhoomi"	Mahesh Babu	Karthik
2.	"Santhosha Santhosha"	Raghavendra Kamath	Ranjith
3.	"Nanna Aaseyanu"	Mahesh Babu	Santhosh Venky
4.	"Raaya Raaya Maleraaya"	Dr. V. Nagendra Prasad	Rahul Nambiar, Archana Ravi
5.	"Hani Hani"	Mahesh Babu	Tippu

== Reception ==
=== Critical response ===
Shashiprasad S M from the Deccan Chronicle wrote, "For Chiranjeevi Sarja, who is still cherishing the success of his previous release Chandralekha, the replica is bound to be an average performer. Will Ajith express his love for a happy ending? Simply avoid if you have watched ‘Paiyaa’". B S Srivani from Deccan Herald wrote "However, a loose thought refuses to go away throughout the film and long after people have left the hall: Would a dubbed Paiyya have saved all the expenses in making this film? Of course, watching suave and earnest Karthi contorting his mouth while someone else’s voice is saying something else would be a little squirm-weird". A critic from Sify.com wrote "Chiranjeevi Sarja's run of the mill performance is clearly visible and nothing exciting. Debutante Nikki Galrani needs to polish her acting skills before she tries her hands on the next project. Though the story is not new, director Mahesh Babu could have made it interesting, only if he had added certain attention-grabbing elements. Music by Yuvan Shanka[r] Raja is undoubtedly the best for the reason that it has the same tunes as that of the original. Remakes cannot always be a safe bet is what one has to understand through Ajith".
