= Thuli Thuli =

Song by Yuvan Shankar Raja (composer) and Haricharan, Tanvi Shah (performer)

from the album Paiyaa (soundtrack)
- Language: Tamil
- Released: 12 February 2010
- Recorded: 2009
- Studio: Kalasa Studios, Chennai
- Genre: Feature film soundtrack
- Length: 4:29
- Label: Think Music
- Songwriters: Yuvan Shankar Raja (music), Na. Muthukumar (lyrics)
- Producer: Yuvan Shankar Raja

"Thuli Thuli" is a song from the 2010 Tamil feature film Paiyaa, composed by Yuvan Shankar Raja. The song, with lyrics by Na. Muthukumar and performed by Haricharan and Tanvi Shah, was released as part of the soundtrack album of the film on 12 February 2010.

Lyrically, the song tells the feelings of a young man who saw and fell in love with a young, attractive girl at first sight. The song, along with its entire soundtrack album, has received highly positive reviews from music critics, achieving commercial success, staying for over 8 months in the charts. The song has become the first Tamil song to be featured in an all India index of the Top 20 songs on radio for the month of April 2010, indicating this song was played on all Indian FM radio stations more often than any other song in the history of Tamil film music ever.

== Inspiration and development ==
Composer Yuvan Shankar Raja said, that the tune of this song came "immediately to his mind", when director N. Linguswamy was explaining the situation about the film's protagonist falling in love at first sight. He further more, revealed that he had developed this tune even some years earlier, when he saw a "beautiful girl", while driving in rain. However, he was too shy to express his feelings and instead developed a tune in his mind, which he and Linguswamy decided to reuse for this song.

== Accolades ==
Award	Category	Name	Outcome
2011 Vijay Music Awards	Best Male Singer (Jury)	Haricharan for "Thuli Thuli"	Nominated
2011 Vijay Music Awards	Popular Song of the Year 2010	"Thuli Thuli"	Nominated
2011 Vijay Music Awards	Popular Melody of the Year 2010	"Thuli Thuli"	Nominated
2011 Vijay Music Awards	Popular Male Singer of the Year 2010	Haricharan for "Thuli Thuli"	Nominated
2011 Vijay Music Awards	Mirchi Listener's Choice of the Year 2010	Yuvan Shankar Raja & Haricharan for "Thuli Thuli" (also for Rahul Nambiar for "Adada Mazhaida")	Won

== Other versions ==
The song was reused in the Kannada remake Ajith (2014) as "Hani Hani".
