= Biriyani (soundtrack) =

Soundtrack album by Yuvan Shankar Raja
- Released: 21 August 2013
- Recorded: 2012–2013
- Genre: Feature film soundtrack
- Length: 34:37
- Language: Tamil
- Label: Sony Music India
- Producer: Yuvan Shankar Raja

Yuvan Shankar Raja chronology
Thillu Mullu (2013)	Biriyani (2013)	Arrambam (2013)

Biriyani is the soundtrack album, composed by Yuvan Shankar Raja, to the 2013 black comedy film of the same name, directed by Venkat Prabhu starring Karthi, Hansika Motwani, Premgi Amaren and Mandy Takhar. It is the 100th album of Yuvan Shankar Raja. In this album, there are 6 songs and two remixes with lyrics written by Gangai Amaran, Vaali, Madhan Karky, Psycho.unit, Gaana Bala, Tanvi Shah and Yuvan Himself. The film also features Karthi, its protagonist, debuting as a Playback singer. After multiple postponements, the soundtrack album was released on 21 August 2013.

== Production ==
Yuvan Shankar Raja composed the soundtrack and film score for Biriyani, continuing his association with Venkat Prabhu, which will be his 100th film. Prabhu has stated that the soundtrack album will have "at least 8 to 9 songs". Besides poet Vaali and the director's father Gangai Amaren, who regularly work in Prabhu's films, Niranjan Bharathi, who penned the song "Nee Naan" in the director's previous venture Mankatha, and Madhan Karky were brought on board to write the lyrics, the latter collaborating the first time with Yuvan Shankar Raja.

In August 2012, Venkat Prabhu and Yuvan Shankar Raja flew to a resort in Malaysia to compose the first tunes for the film. After being convinced by the director, film's lead actor Karthi agreed to sing a song titled "Mississippi" for the soundtrack, making his debut in playback singing, which was recorded in December 2012. In March 2013, Venkat Prabhu informed that two songs had been recorded and two more songs had been composed already, while two more were left to work on, which were both said to be "background songs", to be shown in montage. In late July 2013, four leading contemporary music directors, G. V. Prakash Kumar, S. Thaman, Vijay Antony and D. Imman, were chosen to sing the number "Thirumbi Vaa", which was termed as a "motivational song" by the director. Venkat Prabhu later disclosed that composer A. R. Rahman was also supposed to sing the song along with the four others, but that he could not be signed owing to a contract that prevented him from singing for other music directors. Sources however hinted that Rahman would be the chief guest at the audio launch. UK musicians, record producer Charles Bosco and R&B singer Arjun, were reported to have composed an additional track for the film, with the duo explaining later that it was a remix of one of the film's original tracks. Moreover, two more remixes were produced by Yuvan Shankar Raja himself, for the first time remixing his own composition, and Premgi Amaren, respectively.

== Release ==
The audio rights of the soundtrack were acquired by Sony Music India in May 2013. The album was scheduled to be released on 15 August 2013 at The Leela Palace, Chennai with sources suggesting that the team was planning to recruit leading music directors from the Malayalam, Telugu and Hindi film industries for the launch. However, the audio launch was postponed to 31 August, according to sources. On 16 August, the audio tracks were leaked online causing an uproar from the team. Due to the leak, the planned audio launch was subsequently cancelled, and though it was announced that the album would be directly released to stores on 21 August 2013, the audio launch eventually happened at an undisclosed FM station on 21 August.

== Reception ==
The soundtrack album received positive response. Behindwoods wrote "With complete free hand from Venkat Prabhu, Yuvan has loads of fun composing his 100th ! You too have fun listening !" and rated the album 3/5. IndiaGlitz wrote "Alright the feast is served, wait it's only the audio that is out. The movie will have to wait another month, till then get ready to sync your iPod with Yuvan's 100thalbum, which is sure to spice you up. A Venkat Prabhu feast with Karthi's commercial gimmick, the album is early but sure to rock your wits out. Pump up the Volume, it's party time!". Musicperk.com wrote "A word needs to be said about Yuvan-Venkat Prabhu combination for delivering chartbusters right from Chennai 28, Saroja, Goa, Mankatha & Biriyani follows the tradition too. ’Biriyani’ hyped as Yuvan’s 100th album doesn’t disappoint the fans. It has Yuvan at his experimental best & would certainly be an added pillar to the movie" and rated it 8/10 further adding that it's an "Uber-cool album after a very long time!". way2movies.com gave a positive review terming the Album a "Trade mark Peppy melody from Yuvan Shankar Raja". Milliblog, which is known for its 100 word reviews wrote a 200 word review praising the compositions. It stated that Yuvan’s 100th deserves Milliblog’s 200.

== Track list ==
Tamil
No.	Title	Lyrics	Singer(s)	Length
1.	"Biriyani"	Gangai Amaran, Tanvi Shah (English)	Tanvi Shah, Bhavatharini, Vilasini	3:17
2.	"Nahna Na Nah"	Vaali, Yuvan Shankar Raja	Devan Ekambaram, Yuvan Shankar Raja	4:27
3.	"Pom Pom Penne"	Madhan Karky	Rahul Nambiar, Ramya NSK	4:26
4.	"Mississippi"	Vaali	Karthi, Premgi Amaren, Priya Himesh	4:28
5.	"Run for your Life"	Psycho.unit, Gaana Bala	Psycho.unit feat. Gaana Bala	4:52
6.	"Edhirthu Nil"	Gangai Amaran	Yuvan Shankar Raja feat. G. V. Prakash Kumar, D. Imman, Vijay Antony, S. Thaman	4:21
7.	"Nahna Na Nah (New Jack Swing Mix)" (Mixed & Arranged by Yuvan Shankar Raja)	Vaali	Devan Ekambaram, Yuvan Shankar Raja	4:27
8.	"Nahna Na Nah (Extended Dance Mix)" (Mixed & Arranged by Premgi Amaren)	Vaali	Devan Ekambaram, Yuvan Shankar Raja, Premgi Amaren	5:37
Total length:				34:37

Telugu Version

The Telugu version's audio launch took place on 6 December 2013 at Hyderabad. The Telugu version's audio was launched by the film's unit then on Sony Music Label.

Telugu
No.	Title	Lyrics	Singer(s)	Length
1.	"Biriyani"	Ananta Sriram	Tanvi Shah, Bhavatharini, Harshini	3:19
2.	"Bay Of Bengal"	Krishna Chaitanya	Krish	4:31 Original Version
3.	"Pam Pam Pam"	Shreemani	Rahul Nambiar, Ramya NSK	4:29
4.	"Mississippi"	Balaji	Karthi, Premgi Amaren, Priya Himesh	4:32
5.	"Biriyani (Rap)"	Kasarla Shyam	Rakendu Mouli, Priya Himesh, Vandemataram Srinivas	4:53
6.	"Adugule Na Ningi"	Ramajogayya Sastry	Sathyan, Saketh Naidu, Senthil Dass, Rakendu Mouli	4:27
7.	"Bay Of Bengal (New Jack Swing Mix)" (Mixed & Arranged by Yuvan Shankar Raja)	Krishna Chaitanya	Krish, Premgi Amaren	4:31
8.	"Bay Of Bengal (Extended Dance Mix)" (Mixed & Arranged by Premgi Amaren)	Krishna Chaitanya	Premgi Amaren	5:39
Total length:				35:55
