= Super Deluxe (soundtrack) =

2019 film score by Yuvan Shankar Raja

Film score by Yuvan Shankar Raja
- Released: 27 May 2020
- Recorded: 2018–2019
- Genres: Rock and roll, pop, retro style, jazz music, contemporary classical, Indian classical, avant-garde, experimental
- Length: 27:13
- Label: U1 Records
- Producer: Yuvan Shankar Raja

Yuvan Shankar Raja chronology
Peranbu (2019)	Super Deluxe (2019)	NGK (2019)

Super Deluxe is the soundtrack to the 2019 Tamil-language film of the same name, co-written, co-produced and directed by Thiagarajan Kumararaja. The album featured 18 instrumental pieces, composed, arranged, produced and programmed by Yuvan Shankar Raja, eventually marking his second collaboration with Kumararaja after Aaranya Kaandam (2011). Unlike, his first film which had no songs, Kumararaja demanded to include a soundtrack having lyrical songs, but later abandoned. This film, eventually marked Yuvan's third musical which did not contain any songs (after Adhu and Aaranya Kaandam). The team, however reused licensed compositions from yesteryear films.

Yuvan, however worked on the film's background score, which was critically acclaimed and fetched him the award for Best Music Director at the 13th edition of Ananda Vikatan Cinema Awards (also for Peranbu). On 27 May 2020, Yuvan's own music label, U1 Records, released the album through music streaming platforms, that consisted of instrumental pieces, used in the background; particularly due to the demand for releasing the film score into a separate album. The extended version of the original score were released through non-fungible tokens (NFT).

== Background ==
In an interview with S. Srivatsan of The Hindu, Kumararaja expressed his interest on producing a soundtrack for Super Deluxe and constantly been in touch with Yuvan Shankar Raja for the songs. His previous, as well as debut directorial, Aaranya Kaandam also featured music by Yuvan, did not feature any songs due to S. P. Charan's decision. Kumararaja had a brief influence on film music and songs, that insisted for a film soundtrack. The originally planned album features a mishmash of genres — which includes retro-styled themes, jazz and contemporary classical music. This decision was however taken aback, and instead reused compositions from yesteryear films, including the likes of Ilaiyaraaja, M. S. Viswanathan, Deva and Bappi Lahiri.

Yuvan Shankar Raja released a sneak peek in September 2018, saying that the work on the film's background score is in progress. Tapas Nayak worked on the sound design while the re-recording and mixing of the film score was handled by the duo Arun–Seenu. Speaking about the sound design, the duo said that "the director emphasized on delivering a realistic sound design and gave higher importance to sound over music. He encouraged us to use a lot of reverberating-effect in the film, a tool normally deployed in cinema to create pathos-evoking background score."

== Themes and analysis ==
Thiagarajan Kumararaja spoke about the inclusion of pop culture references, including film music, songs and scenes that infuse in the writing. The title track of Disco Dancer (1982), was included in one of the scenes as, according to Kumararaja, he liked the film and its songs; its influence made him to include this song in that particular scene. He stated that "While writing a story or think of a scene, I always played some song in the background. Sometimes when I don’t add a song at the writing stage, I do it while editing the film." The use of retro music and old songs in the background was raved by critics and cinephiles. The News Minute-based critic Anjana Shekhar praised the "background score brims with nostalgia-inducing music that has now sent us scrambling to rediscover the old songs, especially Ilaiyaraaja's divine music". The use of old Tamil songs in the film was noted by Neeraja Ramesh, who wrote a blog about this in the column: Tracking Indian Communities, Dravidian, Roots & Wings for The Times of India. Nalini Kathiravan, a teacher who watched the film twice, commented about the use of retro songs and mentioned one from the film, in particular, saying:

I was stunned when the opening scene began with "Paniyum Neeye" from Panimalar (1981). A long lost song that stirred my memory with romantic moments from the past. I was remembering my college days when we only had the radio. We used to consider ourselves lucky if our favourite song was played.

== Critical response ==
M. Suganth of The Times of India rated the musical score 4 stars out of 5. Firstpost-based critic Sreedhar Pillai praised the background score and sound design, saying "the score is in sync with the narration". Writing for the American-based news magazine, The Week, editor Sarath Ramesh Kuniyl commented that the background music is "thrilling" and further said "The background score is the film's constant companion, manoeuvring it through the ebb and flow. Even noise has a melody in the film, in the hands of Raja and Kumararaja." In the review for Huffington Post, Ranjani Krishnakumar said that "Yuvan Shankar Raja does a rousing job with the background score, elevating every scene a notch, sometimes with sounds, sometimes with silence. The ambient sounds are as much a character as any of the human ones. But a mere ‘thank you’ card for Ilaiyaraaja won't suffice for the role his music has played in this film, each important scene playing out against the background of an immaculately chosen ‘situation-song’. It adds a touch of magic to every actor's performance."

Prem Udayabhanu of Manorama Online, stated that the score is "sublime as well as savage as the situation demands". Film Companion-based critic-journalist Baradwaj Rangan stated about "the bravery in the songlessness, in how Yuvan Shankar Raja calls attention to a situation about infidelity by reusing his father’s classic song about infidelity. A less-secure composer might have fought harder to impose himself on the score, which is marvellously minimalistic." Joe Leydon of Variety, praised Yuvan Shankar Raja's work, saying that "the background score ups the ammo of the film". Anupama Subramanian of Deccan Chronicle praised the score as "brilliant" and "also lets silence speak in some of the crucial scenes".

== Accolades ==
Award	Date of ceremony	Category	Nominee(s)	Result	Ref.
Ananda Vikatan Cinema Awards	11 January 2020	Best Music Director	Yuvan Shankar Raja	Won	

== Track listing ==
Yuvan decided to release the instrumental tracks used in the background as a separate album, after being constantly demanded by fans. A year after the film's release, the original soundtrack was unveiled by U1 Records on 27 May 2020. It features 18 tracks, spanning a runtime of 27 minutes, and various instruments being used in the score.

All music is composed by Yuvan Shankar Raja.

No.	Title	Artist(s)	Length
1.	"Vaembu Of Super Deluxe"	Govind Vasantha (Violin)	0:26
2.	"Moodman78@Hotmail"	Babu (Trumpet), Maxwell (Trombone, Brass)	0:27
3.	"The Arrival"	Yuvan Shankar Raja	1:38
4.	"When Dimitri Spoke Tamizh"	Thirumoorthy (Nadaswaram)	0:39
5.	"Instinct"	Yuvan Shankar Raja	2:05
6.	"The Big Sheep"	Yuvan Shankar Raja	1:20
7.	"Inner-Workings"	Yuvan Shankar Raja	0:45
8.	"The Call"	Yuvan Shankar Raja	0:47
9.	"Final Flight of Ex"	Thirumoorthy (Nadaswaram), Kaviraj (Thavil)	0:19
10.	"Hello Kitty"	Yuvan Shankar Raja	0:53
11.	"Mother"	Yuvan Shankar Raja	1:58
12.	"Eclipse"	Yuvan Shankar Raja	1:43
13.	"Ek Gaon Mein"	Yuvan Shankar Raja	1:10
14.	"Adhu Verum Kal-lu Dhaan Saami"	Yuvan Shankar Raja	3:34
15.	"When Dimitri Spoke Tamizh with Piano"	Yuvan Shankar Raja	0:39
16.	"Berlin Loves You"	Yuvan Shankar Raja	2:03
17.	"Happy Ending"	Babu (Trumpet), Maxwell (Trombone)	1:14
18.	"Vaazhvin Ragasiyam"	Yuvan Shankar Raja	5:23

== Additional music ==
A promotional video teaser titled "Ding Dong" was released on 25 March 2019, days prior to the film's release. The teaser featured voice-overs of the lead artists, Sethupathi, Faasil and Samantha. The extended version of the soundtrack, including the three additional themes ("Raasukutty", "Shilpa's Theme" and the audio-version of the film's trailer) were released through non-fungible tokens (NFT). The price of the audio tracks were levied at 60 ethereum (₹1.83 crore), and biddings for the tracks began on 7 June 2021. It is also reported that the amount earned from the proceedings will be donated to COVID-19 frontline workers in collaboration with Tamil Nadu government.

All music is composed by Yuvan Shankar Raja.

No.	Title	Performer(s)	Length
1.	"Ding Dong"	Vijay Sethupathi, Samantha Ruth Prabhu, Fahadh Faasil	1:45
2.	"Raasukutty"	Yuvan Shankar Raja	2:30
3.	"Shilpa's Theme"	Yuvan Shankar Raja	2:04
4.	"Super Deluxe Trailer Theme"	Yuvan Shankar Raja, Vijay Sethupathi	2:01
