= Big FM Tamil Entertainment Awards =

BIG Tamil Entertainment Award is an accolade presented by the Reliance Broadcast Network Limited under three broad categories: Television, Film, and Arts. Part of the BIG Regional Entertainment Awards, the awards were presented first in 2011 for the best of 2010, at a ceremony held on 26 March 2011. The media partner was The Hindu and the broadcast partner was Vijay TV. The winners were elected by people's voting.

== Ceremonies ==
Ceremony	Date	Host(s)
1st BIG Tamil Entertainment Awards	26 March 2011	Ramya and Dheena

== Categories and Winners of 2011 ==
=== Awards for Excellence in Art ===
- Most Entertaining Classical Dancer of the Decade - Padma Subramanyam
- Most Entertaining Bharathanatyam Dancer - Kamal Haasan

=== Awards for Excellence in Films ===
- Most Entertaining Debut Actor - Vidharth for Mynaa
- Most Entertaining Actor - Silambarasan for Vinnaithaandi Varuvaaya
- Most Entertaining Actress - Tamannaah for Paiyaa
- Most Entertaining Director - Rajesh for Boss Engira Bhaskaran
- Most Entertaining Film - Boss Engira Bhaskaran
- Most Entertaining Villain - Venkatesh for Angaadi Theru
- Most Entertaining Music Director - Yuvan Shankar Raja for Paiyaa
- Most Entertaining Female Playback Singer - Chinmayi for Poove Poove from Siddu +2
- Most Entertaining Male Playback Singer - Vijay Prakash for Hosanna from Vinnaithaandi Varuvaaya
- Most Entertaining Lyricist - Na. Muthukumar

=== Awards for Excellence in Television ===
- Most Entertaining Tele Serial - Thekkathi Ponnu from Kalaignar TV
- Most Entertaining Television Actor - Sanjeev for Thirumathi Selvam from Sun TV
- Most Entertaining Television Actress - Devayani for Kodi Mullai from Raj TV
- Most Entertaining Television Villain (Male) - Venu Arvind for Arasi from Sun TV
- Most Entertaining Television Villain (Female) - Brinda Das for Anandham from Sun TV
- Most Entertaining Talk Show - Neeya Naana from Vijay TV
- Most Entertaining Reality Show Host - Gopinath for Neeya Naana form Vijay TV
- Most Entertaining Theatre Group - Koothu-P-Pattarai

=== Special Award ===
- Entertainment Phenomenon - Rajinikanth

== See also ==
- List of Asian television awards
