= Vijay Music Awards =

Tamil music awards

- Awarded for: Best in Tamil music
- Country: India
- Presented by: Vijay TV
- First award: 2011
- Website: vijaymusicawards.com

A Vijay Music Award is an accolade given by Vijay TV to recognize outstanding achievement in the Tamil music industry in India. The annual awards ceremony made its debut in 2011 and recognized excellence in music launched during the previous calendar year. It launched its official website in partnership with Galatta.com. Its main sponsor was India Gate Basmati Rice and it was powered by The Chennai Silks. Media partners were the publications The Hindu and Kumudam.

The first award ceremony took place in Nehru Indoor Stadium on 11 May 2011. The ceremony was broadcast by Vijay TV in two parts on 26 and 27 May 2011.

== Ceremonies ==
Ceremony	Date	Host(s)
1st Vijay Music Awards	May 11, 2011	Gopinath and Divya Vijay gopal
2nd Vijay Music Awards	October 28, 2012	

== Award categories ==
Awards were given in 25 categories, chosen by a jury appointed by Vijay TV and the public.

== Jury Awards ==
The list of winners 2010:

=== Best Male Singer ===
Year	Singer	Song	Film
2009	Devi Sri Prasad	"Kannum Rendum"	Kutty
2011	Haricharan	"Aariro"	Deiva Thirumagal

=== Best Female Singer ===
Year	Singer	Song	Film
2010	Shreya Ghoshal; Andrea Jeremiah	"Mannipaaya" "Maalai Neram"	Vinnaithaandi Varuvaayaa; Aayirathil Oruvan
2011	Chinmayi	"Sara Sara"	Vaagai Sooda Vaa

=== Best Music Director ===
Year	Music director	Film
2010	A. R. Rahman	Vinnaithaandi Varuvaayaa
2011	Harris Jayaraj	Engeyum Kaadhal

=== Best Lyricist ===
Year	Lyricist	Film
2010	Kamal Haasan	Manmadan Ambu

=== Best Folk Song ===
Year	Song	Film	Composer	Singer
2010	"Jilla Veetu"	Eesan	James Vasanthan	Thanjai Selvi
2011	"Otha Sollaala"	Aadukalam	G. V. Prakash Kumar	Velmurugan

=== Best Lyricist with the Maximum Hits in a Year ===
Year	Lyricist
2010	Na. Muthukumar
2011	Na. Muthukumar

=== Best Singer with the Maximum Hits in a Year ===
Year	Singer
2010	Yuvan Shankar Raja

=== Best Song Sung by a Music Director ===
Year	Music Director	Song	Film
2010	Yuvan Shankar Raja	"En Kadhal Solla"	Paiyaa
2011	G. V. Prakash Kumar	"Yathe Yathe"	Aadukalam

=== Best Debut Singer ===
Year	Singer	Song	Film
2010	Alphons Joseph	"Aaromale"	Vinnaithaandi Varuvaayaa
2011	Richard	Nangaai	Engeyum Kaadhal

=== Best Debut Music Director ===
Year	Music Director	Film
2010	Kannan	Tamizh Padam
2011	Satya	Engeyum Eppodhum

=== Best Western Song ===
Year	Song	Film	Composer	Singer
2011	Nangaai	Engeyum Kaadhal	Harris Jayaraj	Richard

=== Best Sound Mixing ===
Year	Winner	Film
2010	K. J. Singh, P.A.Deepak, S.Sivakumar and Resul Pookutty	Enthiran
2011	V.Shrihari and Raj Krishnan	Mayakkam Enna

=== Best Song by an Actor ===
Year	Actor	Song	Film
2010	Kamal Haasan	"Neela Vaanam"	Manmadan Ambu

== Honoring The Legends ==
=== Lifetime Achievement Award ===
Year	Winner
2010	K. J. Yesudas

=== Isai Assangal ===
Year	Winner
2010	L. R. Eswari and Vani Jairam

=== Global Indian ===
Year	Winner
2010	A. R. Rahman
2014	Anirudh Ravichander

=== Isai Chakravarthi ===
Year	Winner
2010	M. S. Viswanathan

=== Evergreen Voice ===
Year	Winner
2010	K. J. Yesudas
2011	S. Janaki

== Popular awards ==
The winners are selected by the people by SMS voting, online voting, voting at various stalls opened by the channel, and with a bus to collect votes at various cities, called the Rasigan Express. The award's online partner also enabled online voting for the popular category. Several award that had been announced were not awarded. The list of 2010 winners:

=== Popular Singer Female ===
Year	Singer	Song	Film
2010	Chinmayi	"Kilimanjaro"	Enthiran

=== Popular Singer Male ===
Year	Singer	Song	Film
2010	Karthik	"Usure Poguthe"	Raavanan

=== Popular Album of the Year ===
Year	Album	Composer
2010	Vinnaithaandi Varuvaayaa	A. R. Rahman

=== Popular Song of the Year ===
Year	Song	Film	Composer	Singers
2010	"Kilimanjaro"	Enthiran	A. R. Rahman	Chinmayi and Javed Ali
2011	"Enamo Aedho"	Ko	Harris Jayaraj	Aalap Raju

=== Popular Song of the Masses ===
Year	Song	Film	Composer	Singers
2010	"Kadhal Vandale"	Singam	Devi Sri Prasad	Baba Sehgal and Priyadarshini

=== Popular Duet of the Year ===
Year	Song	Film	Composer	Singers
2010	"Idhu Varai"	Goa	Yuvan Shankar Raja	Ajeesh and Andrea Jeremiah
2011	"Piram Thedum"	Mayakkam Enna	G. V. Prakash Kumar	G. V. Prakash Kumar and Saindhavi

=== Popular Melody of the Year ===
Year	Song	Film	Composer	Singers
2010	"Thuli Thuli"	Paiyaa	Yuvan Shankar Raja	Haricharan

=== Mirchi Listeners Choice Award for Best Song ===
Year	Song	Film	Composer	Singer
2010	"Thuli Thuli"	Paiyaa	Yuvan Shankar Raja	Haricharan

== See also ==
- Vijay Awards
- Tamil cinema
- Cinema of India
