= Haricharan =

Indian singer

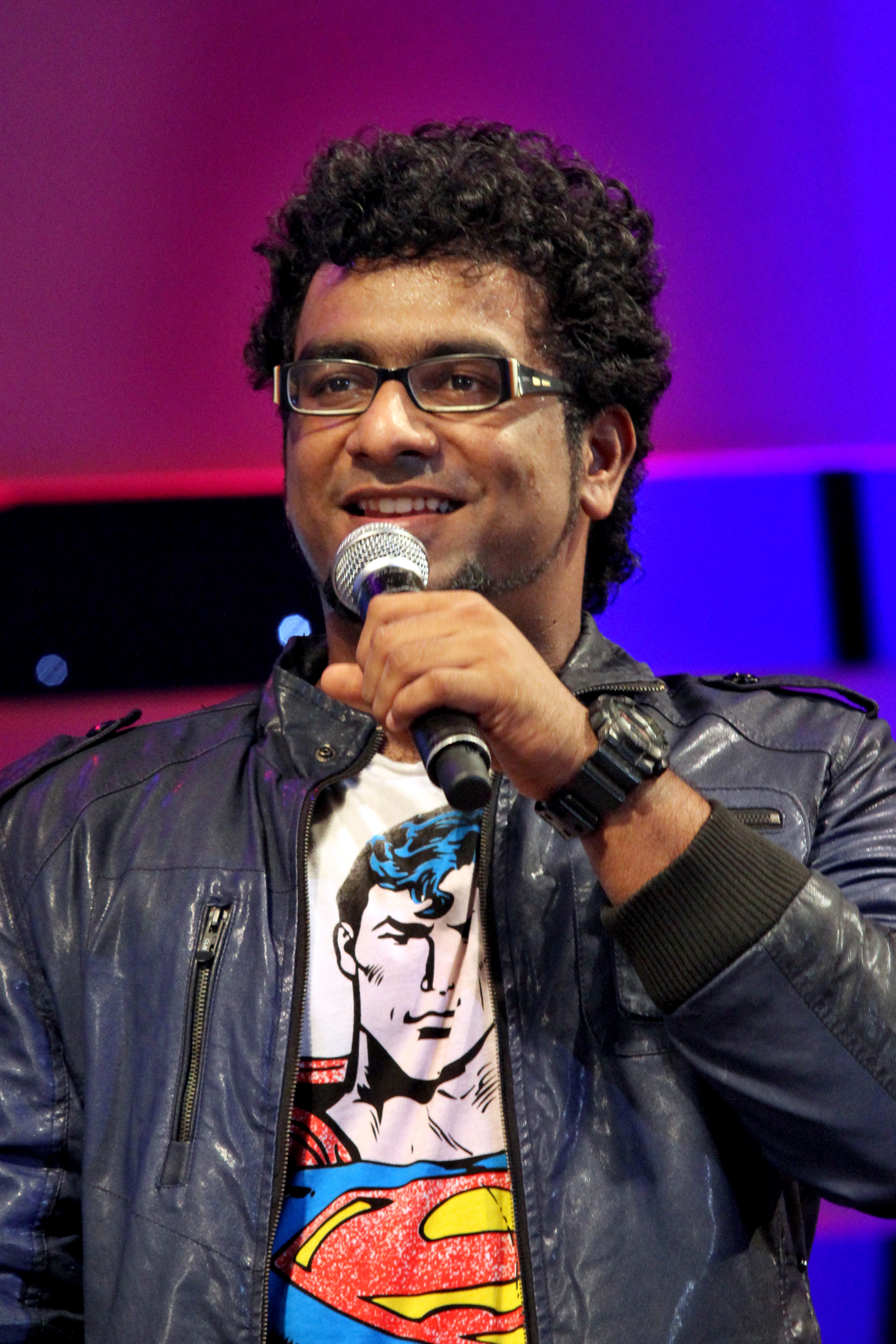
- Haricharan performing at an event

Background information
- Born: Haricharan Seshadri; 20 March 1980 (age 46); Madras (now Chennai), Tamil Nadu, India
- Genre: Various
- Occupations: Singer & Musician
- Years active: 2005–present
- Label: Multiple

Haricharan Seshadri, known mononymously as HARICHARAN (born 20 March 1980), is an Indian Carnatic vocalist, playback singer, and musician who predominantly works in Tamil, Malayalam, Hindi, Telugu and Kannada music and cinema. He has sung over 2,500 songs in films and Private albums as of 2026.

He recorded his first Tamil film song for Kaadhal to Joshua Sridhar's music when he was 24, and went on to record three songs in his debut movie. His song "Unakkena Iruppen" was nominated for the National Film Awards in 2005 and became widely popular. However Haricharan became popular only after his rendition of the song "Thuli Thuli", composed by Yuvan Shankar Raja for the movie Paiyaa (2010).

== Background ==
Haricharan comes from a Tamil music family from Chennai, India. His grandfather P. S. Ganapathy was an organiser of mic-less Carnatic concerts in the 60s under the name "Aalapanaa", and his grandmother Smt. Alamelu Ganapathy is a national awardee in Mathematics, and has been in academia for more than 35 years. His father G. Seshadri is an artist through AIR, and a bank employee, and his mother Latha is a librarian in P. S. Senior Secondary School. Haricharan started learning Carnatic music at an early age of seven under Smt. Sethu Mahadevan, and then from stalwarts like K. V. Narayanaswamy, T. M. Prabhavathi and P. S. Narayanaswamy.

He recorded his first Tamil film song for the film Kaadhal, in Joshua Sridhar's music when he was 17, and went on to record three songs in his debut movie. His song "Unakkena Iruppen" was nominated for the National Film Awards in 2005 which became widely popular. Since then he has recorded several hit numbers for various music directors across the south, predominantly in Tamil, Kannada, Telugu and Malayalam languages. He became more famous after his more recent song, "Thuli Thuli". Haricharan is one of the most used singers in Yuvan Shankar Raja's music. He has also sung Rotaract Change Anthem for RI Dist 3230.

In 2012, Haricharan sang alongside Rajinikanth for the song "Maattram Ondrudhaan Maradhadhu" from soundtrack of Kochadaiiyaan, which was composed by A. R. Rahman and released in 2014.

== Awards ==
=== Won ===
Filmfare Awards South

- 2015 - Filmfare Award for Best Male Playback Singer – Malayalam - Bangalore Days
- 2024 - Filmfare Award for Best Male Playback Singer – Tamil - Ponniyin Selvan: II
- 2025 - Filmfare Award for Best Male Playback Singer – Tamil - Amaran

IIFA Utsavam

- 2016 -IIFA Utsavam Award for Best Playback Singer - Male - Telugu - Baahubali
- 2016 - IIFA Utsavam Award for Best Playback Singer - Male - Tamil - Baahubali
- 2017- IIFA Utsavam Award for Best Playback Singer - Male - Telugu -Krishnagadi Veera premagadha

Asianet Film Awards

- 2015-Best Playback singer - Banglore Days

== Discography ==
=== Tamil discography ===
Year	Film	Song	Composer	Co-singer(s)
2004	Kaadhal	"Unakkena Iruppaen"	Joshua Sridhar	
2004	Kaadhal	"Thottu Thottu"	Joshua Sridhar	Harini Sudhakar
2004	Kaadhal	"Kaadhal"	Joshua Sridhar	
2005	February 14	"Idhu Kadhala"	Bharadwaj	
2005	6′.2″	"Nee Otha Inchu"	D. Imman	Sangeetha Sajith
2005	ABCD	"Yengo Yengo"	D. Imman	Mahathi
2006	Parijatham	"Unnai Kandene"	Dharan	Shruthi
2006	Parijatham	"Ennil Ennil Nee"	Dharan	
2006	Pattiyal	"Poga Poga Boomi Virikiradhe"	Yuvan Shankar Raja	Vijay Yesudas, Harini Sudhakar, Saindhavi
2006	Unnale Unnale	"Vaigaasi Nilave"	Harris Jayaraj	Madhushree
2006	Kalabha Kadhalan	"Mann Meedu"	Niru	
2006	Uyir	"Kann Simittum Nerame"	Joshua Sridhar	Mahathi, Shalini
2006	Thoothukudi	"Sollamal"	Pravin Mani	
2006	Boys and Girls	"Yeazhunalil Onde"	Sirpy	
2006	Nenjirukkum Varai	"Kadhaliye"	Srikanth Deva	
2006	Thirudi	"Kadhal Kadhal"	Bharani	
2006	Thirudi	"Teen Age Vayasikudhan"	Bharani	
2007	Deepavali	"Thoduven"	Yuvan Shankar Raja	Maya
2007	Kannamoochi Yenada	"Megam Megam"	Yuvan Shankar Raja	Shweta Mohan
2007	Kannamoochi Yenada	"Andru Vandhadhum"	Yuvan Shankar Raja	Shankar Mahadevan
2007	Vel	"Ottraikannale"	Yuvan Shankar Raja	Suchitra
2007	Machakaaran	"Vaanathayum Megathayum"	Yuvan Shankar Raja	
2007	Thottal Poo Malarum	"Arabu Naade"	Yuvan Shankar Raja	Yuvan Shankar Raja
2007	Thottal Poo Malarum	"Ennai Pidicha"	Yuvan Shankar Raja	
2007	Chennai 600028	"Jalsa"	Yuvan Shankar Raja	Ranjith, Tippu, Karthik, Premgi Amaren
2007	Kalloori	"Sariya Idhu Thavara"	Joshua Sridhar	
2007	Kalloori	"Unnarugil Varugayil"	Joshua Sridhar	Harini Sudhakar
2007	Kalloori	"Kalloori"	Joshua Sridhar	
2007	Vaazhthugal	"Pookal Rasithathu"	Yuvan Shankar Raja	Ajindan
2007	Vaazhthugal	"Endhan Vaanamum"	Yuvan Shankar Raja	Mahathi
2007	Vaazhthugal	"Kannil Vandhadhum"	Yuvan Shankar Raja	Dishanthan
2007	Koodal Nagar	"Yaarathu Yaarathu"	Sabesh–Murali	Shweta Mohan
2007	Kasu Irukkanum	"Sandhaikku Pora Machan"	Kavin Saradha & Raj Shankar	Anuradha Sriram, Mohan Ram
2007	Ninaithu Ninaithu Parthen	"Aandipatti Party"	Joshua Sridhar	Sukhwinder Singh, Saindhavi, Premgi Amaren
2007	Ninaithu Ninaithu Parthen	"Yaar Thandha Saabam"	Joshua Sridhar	Harini Sudhakar
2007	Sivi	"Maayavi Neeya"	Dharan	Krish, Shruthi
2007	Vegam	"Vegam"	Rajhesh Vaidhya	Ranjith
2007	Rameswaram	"Alaigallin Osai"	Niru	Kalyani
2007	Rameswaram	"Ellorayum Ethipoga"	Niru	Manikka Vinayagam, Reshmi, Suriya
2008	Yaaradi Nee Mohini	"Oh Baby Oh Baby"	Yuvan Shankar Raja	Andrea Jeremiah, Naveen, Bhargavi
2008	Yaaradi Nee Mohini	"Paalakattu" (D. Imman Mix)	D. Imman	Suchitra, Vinaya
2008	Vennila Kabadi Kuzhu	"Uyiril Yedho"	V. Selvaganesh	
2008	Saroja	"Dosth Bada Dosth"	Yuvan Shankar Raja	Naveen, Rahul Nambiar
2008	Dhaam Dhoom	"Aazhiyile"	Harris Jayaraj	
2008	Laadam	"Siru Thoduthalile"	Dharan	Bombay Jayashree
2008	Laadam	"Makkah"	Dharan	Benny Dayal
2008	Nenjathai Killadhe	"Oru Manasula"	Premgi Amaren	Chinmayi
2008	Sila Nerangalil	"Thirudapatta Nilave"	Srikanth Deva	K. S. Chithra
2008	Thozha	"Kaadhal Devathai"	Premgi Amaren	Saindhavi
2008	Ini Varum Kaalam	"Kaalayil Enthiruchhu"	Bharani	Vikram
2008	Muniyandi Vilangial Moonramandu	"Potta Kuruviyo"	Vidyasagar	Mahathi
2008	Mahesh, Saranya Matrum Palar	"Vizhiyil Vizhiyil"	Vidyasagar	Rita
2009	Siva Manasula Sakthi	"MGR Illenge"	Yuvan Shankar Raja	
2009	Ayan	"Oyaayiyae"	Harris Jayaraj	Benny Dayal, Chinmayi
2009	Adhe Neram Adhe Idam	"Adhu Oru Kaalam"	Premgi Amaren	Premgi Amaren
2009	Adhe Neram Adhe Idam	"Mudhal Murai"	Premgi Amaren	Harini, Tippu
2009	Thiru Thiru Thuru Thuru	"Jillena Veesum"	Mani Sharma	Saindhavi
2009	Siddu +2	"Kelu Kelu"	Dharan	Ganja Karuppu
2009	Vandae Maatharam	"Vande Maatharam"	D. Imman	Chinmayi, D. Imman, Vijay Yesudas, Krish, Benny Dayal, Harish Raghavendra, Mathangi, Pop Shalini, Srilekha Parthasarathy, Suchitra
2009	Karthik Anitha	"Kaadhal Salai"	Jack Anand	
2009	Ragavan	"Sithanna"	Gangai Amaran	Anuradha Sriram
2009	Thalai Ezhuthu	"Ethaniyo Kanavugal" (sad)	Godwin	
2009	Thalai Ezhuthu	"Ethaniyo Kanavugal" (happy)	Godwin	
2009	Solla Solla Inikkum	"Hey Azhagiya Penne"	Bharadwaj	
2009	Saa Boo Thiri	"Mazhaye Mazhaye"	Abbas Rafi	
2009	Thozhi	"Anbendra Vaasam"	R. Shankar	
2009	Thozhi	"Naan Engu"	R. Shankar	
2010	Paiyaa	"Thuli Thuli"	Yuvan Shankar Raja	Tanvi Shah
2010	Angadi Theru	"Un Perai Sollum"	G. V. Prakash Kumar	Naresh Iyer, Shreya Ghoshal
2010	Bale Pandiya	"Happy"	Devan Ekambaram	Various
2010	Baana Kaathadi	"Kuppathu Rajakkal"	Yuvan Shankar Raja	Rahul Nambiar, Sathyan
2010	Boss Engira Bhaskaran	"Yaar Indha Penthan"	Yuvan Shankar Raja	
2010	Naan Mahaan Alla	"Va Va Nilava Pudichu"	Yuvan Shankar Raja	
2010	Pugaippadam	"Odaikanum Odaikunam"	Gangai Amaran	Vijay Yesudas
2010	Mundhinam Paartheney	"Kanavena"	S. Thaman	Suchitra
2010	Sivappu Mazhai	"Kadhal Thandi"	Deva	Chinmayi
2010	Rettaisuzhi	"Naan Endru Sol" (Version 1)	Karthik Raja	Hariharan, Sriram Parthasarathy
2010	Kadhalagi	"Kannadasan Kavithaigalai"	A. R. Reihana	
2010	Pa. Ra. Palanisamy	"Inter City"	Dhina	
2010	Mandabam	"My Dear Kirukka"	Iniya Mahesan	Sudha
2010	Vilai	"Vaazhve Un Vilayenna"	D. Imman	
2010	Vilai	"Vilaye Un Vilayenna"	D. Imman	
2010	Ochayee	"Sonthamellaam"	Jeevaraja	
2010	Sanikizhamai Saayangalam 5 Mani	"Enge Pocho"	Xavier	
2011	Avan Ivan	"Rasathi"	Yuvan Shankar Raja	
2011	Mankatha	"Machi Open the Bottle"	Yuvan Shankar Raja	Mano, Premgi Amaren, Tippu, Naveen
2011	Ko	"Gala Gala"	Harris Jayaraj	Tippu, Krish, Sayanora Philip
2011	Deiva Thirumagal	"Aariro"	G. V. Prakash Kumar	
2011	Velayudham	"Rathathin Rathamay"	Vijay Antony	Srimathumitha
2011	Rajapattai	"Podi Paiyan Polave"	Yuvan Shankar Raja	
2011	Vettai	"Damma Damma"	Yuvan Shankar Raja	Shweta Mohan
2011	Muthukku Muthaaga	"Oru Sudidhar Poo"	Kavi Periyathambi	Dr. Lavanya
2011	Ponnar Shankar	"Kodi Katti Koduthalum"	Ilaiyaraaja	Sathyan
2011	Kandaen	"Narmada"	Vijay Ebenezer	Suchitra
2011	Bodinayakkanur Ganesan	"Kolam Potta"	John Peter	
2011	Doo	"Oru Naal Vidu Murai"	Abhishek—Lawrence	Prashanthini
2011	Rowthiram	"Senganthal"	Prakash Nikki	
2011	Sagakkal	"Aaru Padayappaa"	Thayarathnam	Mukesh Mohamed
2011	Uyarthiru 420	"Azhagiya Ravana"	Mani Sharma	Rita
2011	Mudhal Idam	"Inge Vaanthey"	D. Imman	Surmukhi Raman
2011	Yuvan Yuvathi	"24 Hours"	Vijay Antony	
2011	Raa Raa	"Ethotho Ethotho"	Srikanth Deva	
2011	Naan Sivanagiren	"Nee Pogum"	K. S. Manoj	
2012	Vilayada Vaa	"Engu Selveno"	Srimurali	
2012	Marina	"Kadhal Oru"	Girissh G	M. M. Manasi
2012	Maalai Pozhudhin Mayakathilaey	"Yaaro Ivalo"	Achu Rajamani	
2012	Thaandavam	"Oru Paadhi Kadhavu"	G. V. Prakash Kumar	Vandana Srinivasan
2012	Sundarapandian	"Kadhal Vandhu"	N. R. Raghunanthan	
2012	Kumki	"Ayayayyo Aananthamey"	D. Imman	
2012	Leelai	"Unnai Partha Pinbu"	Satish Chakravarthy	Marrianne
2012	Kai Thunindavan	"Kai - Theme Song"	Ishaan Dev	
2012	Naanga	"Enadhu Nenjilay"	Bala Bharathi	Mumbai Sailaja Subramaniam
2012	Kadhal Pisase	"Engiruntho"	Brunthan	
2012	Kantha	"Uyar Thiru Kadhal"	Shakthi R. Selva	Mahathi
2012	Aathi Narayana	"Idhuthana Kadhal"	Srikanth Deva	
2012	Raattinam	"Yeno En Idhayam"	Manu Ramesan	Manu Ramesan, Navin Iyer
2012	Mayanginen Thayanginen	"Unnai Vittu Ponaal"	Kannan	
2012	Marupadiyum Oru Kadhal	"Ullam Kollai Ponen"	Srikanth Deva	Shankar Mahadevan
2012	Pizza	"Rathiri" (Decent Version)	Santhosh Narayanan	
2012	Pizza	"Rathiri" (Arath Version)	Santhosh Narayanan	
2012	Pizza	"Rathiri" (Rap Version)	Santhosh Narayanan	Arunraja Kamaraj, Santhosh Narayanan, Vineeth
2012	Challenge	"Yaaruku Theriyum"	Kannan	
2012	Ammavin Kaipesi	"Amma Thaane"	Rohit Kulkarni	
2012	Ammavin Kaipesi	"Nenjil Eno Indru (Male)"	Rohit Kulkarni	
2012	Sattam Oru Iruttarai	"Thirumba Thirumba"	Vijay Antony	Andrea Jeremiah
2012	Puthumugangal Thevai	"Karuvizhi"	Twinz Chan	Shweta Mohan
2013	Kadal	"Anbin Vaasale"	A. R. Rahman	
2013	Keeripulla	"Un Eera Kaanaal"	Jeffrey	
2013	Ambikapathy	"Unnal Unnal"	A. R. Rahman	Pooja Vaidyanath
2013	Settai	"Poyum Poyum"	S. Thaman	Chinmayi
2013	Neram	"Kaatru Veesum"	Rajesh Murugesan	
2013	Yaaruda Mahesh	"Pudhu Paarvai"	Gopi Sunder	Priya Himesh
2013	Thillu Mullu	"Aaja Aaja"	Yuvan Shankar Raja	Priya Himesh
2013	Theeya Velai Seiyyanum Kumaru	"Enna Pesa"	C. Sathya	
2013	Maryan	"Sonapareeya"	A. R. Rahman	Javed Ali, Nakash Aziz
2013	Thalaivaa	"Thalaivaa Thalaivaa"	G. V. Prakash Kumar	Pooja Vaidyanath
2013	Pattathu Yaanai	"Raja Raja Naandhanae"	S. Thaman	Udit Narayan
2013	Ainthu Ainthu Ainthu	"Vizhiyile Vizhiyile"	Simon	Chinmayi, Blaaze
2013	Endrendrum Punnagai	"Ennatha Solla"	Harris Jayaraj	Karthik, Velmurugan, Ramesh Vinayakam
2013	Pathayeram Kodi	“Bhumika"	K. S. Manoj & G. D. Prasad	
2013	Sillunu Oru Sandhippu	"Yaayum Yaayum"	F. S. Faizal	Hemambika
2013	Vellachi	"Adi Sirukki"	Bhavatharini	Manikka Vinayagam
2013	Kan Pesum Vaarthaigal	"Aaram Arivilae"	Shamanth	Ramya NSK
2013	Gouravam	"Ondraai Ondraai"	S. Thaman	Suchitra
2013	Masani	"Yedho Yedho"	S. N. Fazil	Shweta Mohan
2013	Yamuna	"Oh Nenje"	Elakkiyan	
2013	Unnodu Oru Naal	"Angel Nee"	Sivaprakasam	Krithika
2013	6	"Thedukindrathe"	Srikanth Deva	
2013	Chithirayil Nilachoru	"Kallaale Senju (Male)"	Ilaiyaraaja	
2013	Jannal Oram	Aasa Vecha Manasula"	Vidyasagar	Tippu, Priya Himesh, Abhirami, Priyadarshini, Velmurugan
2013	Jannal Oram	"Unnai Paarkama"	Vidyasagar	Abhirami, Ceceille
2013	Kalyana Samayal Saadham	"Mella Sirithai"	Arrora	Chinmayi
2013	Thagaraaru	"Super Thirudan"	Dharan	
2013	Madha Yaanai Koottam	"Yaro Yaro"	N. R. Raghunanthan	Monali Thakur
2014	Aaha Kalyanam	"Bon Bon"	Dharan	Sunidhi Chauhan
2014	Kochadaiiyaan	"Maattram Ondrudhaan Maaradhadhu"	A. R. Rahman	Rajinikanth, V. Umashankar
2014	Kochadaiiyaan	"Manamaganin Sathiyam"	A. R. Rahman	
2014	Amara Kaaviyam	"Yedhedho Ennam"	Ghibran	Padmalatha
2014	Pulivaal	"Kichu Kichu"	N. R. Raghunanthan	Anitha
2014	Vaaraayo Vennilaave (unreleased film)	"Unnidam Ondrai"	Karthik Raja	Aditi Paul, Saindhavi
2014	Vaaraayo Vennilaave (unreleased film)	"Intha Aylesa"	Karthik Raja	Ramya NSK, Ranjith, Rita
2014	Saivam	"Ore Oru Ooril"	G. V. Prakash Kumar	
2014	Megha	"Kalvane"	Ilaiyaraaja	Ramya NSK
2014	Mundasupatti	"Idhu Enna Kannil"	Sean Roldan	
2014	Mundasupatti	"Ambala Singam"	Sean Roldan	Sean Roldan
2014	Oru Oorla Rendu Raja	"Mazhakaatha"	D. Imman	Vandana Srinivasan & Maria Roe Vincent
2014	Vaayai Moodi Pesavum	"Podhum Nee Ini"	Sean Roldan	
2014	Kaaviya Thalaivan	"Vaanga Makka Vaanga"	A. R. Rahman	Dr. Narayanan
2014	Kaaviya Thalaivan	"Aye Mr. Minor"	A. R. Rahman	Shashaa Tirupati
2014	Kaaviya Thalaivan	"Sandi Kuthirai"	A. R. Rahman	
2014	Kaaviya Thalaivan	"Alli Arjuna Series-Vandhanam Vandhanam"	A. R. Rahman	Bela Shende
2014	I	"Pookkalae Sattru Oyivedungal"	A. R. Rahman	Shreya Ghoshal
2014	Thirudan Police	"Deivam Enbathenna"	Yuvan Shankar Raja	
2014	Lovers	"O Maina Maina"	JB	
2014	Lingaa	"Unmai Orunaal Vellum"	A. R. Rahman	
2014	Kayal	"Paravayaa Parakkurom"	D. Imman	
2014	Kayal	"Unna Ippo Paakanum"	D. Imman	Vandana Srinivasan
2014	Vellaikaara Durai	"Koodha Kathu"	D. Imman	Shreya Ghoshal
2014	Ner Ethir	"Kanmani Nee illaiyel"	Satish Chakravarthy	Satish Chakravarthy
2014	Ninaithathu Yaaro	"Azhagana Kolaikaari"	X.Paulraj	
2014	Ninaithathu Yaaro	"Kairegai" (Duet)	X.Paulraj	Madhushree
2014	Amara	"Ennamo Nadakkude"	D. Imman	Ramya NSK
2014	Panivizhum Malarvanam	"Ava Ennannamo"	B. R. Rajin	
2014	Vallinam	"Uyiril Uyiril"	S. Thaman	
2014	Endrendrum	"Thoda Thoda"	Dharan	Ranina Reddy
2014	Nimirndhu Nil	"Negizhiyinil"	G. V. Prakash Kumar	Saindhavi
2014	Virattu	"Mouname Mouname"	Dharan	Andrea Jeremiah
2014	Yasakhan	"Kannadi Maname"	Satish Chakravarthy	
2014	Oru Oorla	"Thannathaniye"	Ilaiyaraaja	
2014	Koottam	"Ithanai Dhooram"	James Vasanthan	Shweta Mohan
2014	Ennamo Nadakkudhu	"Orakkanna Sachu Nee"	Premgi Amaren	
2014	Pongadi Neengalum Unga Kadhalum	"Chuda Chuda"	Kannan	Elizabeth Malini
2014	Yaamirukka Bayamey	"Vellai Pandhu"	S. N. Prasad	
2014	Naan Than Bala	"Eruna Rayiluthan"	Venkat Krishi	Suchitra
2014	Vetri Selvan	"Enna Enna"	Mani Sharma	Mahathi
2014	Eera Veyyil	"Vaa Vaa"	Jassie Gift	
2014	Kathai Thiraikathai Vasanam Iyakkam	"Live the Moment"	S. Thaman	Venkat Prabhu, Premgi Amaren, Nakul, Shanthanu Bhagyaraj
2014	Poriyaalan	"Un Vizhiyil"	M. S. Jones Rupert	
2014	Aal	"Oor Aal"	Johan Shevanesh	Prathi
2014	Kurai Ondrum Illai	"Killi Killi Pakkam"	Ramanu	Archana Ravi
2014	Gnana Kirukkan	"Madura Marikkozhundhe"	Taj Noor	Saindhavi
2014	Vilaasam	"Salai Ooram Nindru"	Ravi Raaghav	Chinmayi
2014	Kaadu	"Onna Patthi Nenachale"	K	
2014	Naaigal Jaakirathai	"Oyaathe"	Dharan	Dharan
2015	Nanbenda	"Thene Thene Sendhene"	Harris Jayaraj	Praveen Saivi
2015	Baahubali: The Beginning	"Manogari"	M. M. Keeravani	Mohana
2015	Agathinai	"Adiye Kadhaliye"	Maria Manohar	Maria Manohar
2015	Gethu	"Thaen Kaatru"	Harris Jayaraj	Shashaa Tirupati
2015	Mahabalipuram	"Athaadi Yenna Solla"	K	
2015	Thilagar	"Verichu Verichu"	Kannan	Shweta Mohan
2015	Kanchana 2	"Sandi Muni"	Leon James	Leon James
2015	Kangaroo	"Nenjukkuzhi"	Srinivas	Sharanya Srinivas
2015	Thakka Thakka	"Thakka Thakka"	Jakes Bejoy	
2015	Thakka Thakka	"Edhum Sollamal"	Jakes Bejoy	Chinmayi
2015	Pokkiri Mannan	"Kaiyodu Kai"	Indhiravarman	Pooja
2015	Masala Padam	"Evolution of Cinema"	Karthik Acharya	
2015	Thiruttu Rail	"En Devathai"	Jayprakash	Jayprakash
2015	Bhooloham	"Ivan Chennai"	Srikanth Deva	
2016	Kathiravanin Kodai Mazhai	"Nellai Cheemaiyile"	Sambasivam	
2016	24	"Punnagaye"	A. R. Rahman	Shashaa Tirupati
2016	Thittivasal	"Sollaamal Edho"	Harish-Sathish	Madhushree
2016	Thodari	"Pona Usuru Vandhuruchu"	D. Imman	Shreya Ghoshal
2016	Thodari	"Adada Ithuyenna"	D. Imman	Vandana Srinivasan
2016	Chennai 600028 II	"Nee Kidaithai"	Yuvan Shankar Raja	Chinmayi
2016	Bairavaa	"Nillayo"	Santhosh Narayanan	
2016	Miruthan	"Munnal Kadhali" (Reprise)	D. Imman	
2016	Kanithan	"Maiyal Maiyal"	Sivamani	Shweta Mohan
2016	Sowkarpettai	"Ayyo Vallikudhe"	John Peter	
2016	Natpadhigaram 79	"Nanba Nanba Anbendral"	Deepak Nilambar	Deepak Nilambar
2016	Thozha	"Thozha"	Gopi Sundar	Anirudh Ravichander
2016	Zero	"Veredhuvum Nijamae Illai"	Nivas K. Prasanna	
2016	Narathan	"Saaral Veesum"	Mani Sharma	Rita
2016	Oru Naal Koothu	"Eppo Varuvaaro"	Justin Prabhakaran	
2016	Angali Pangali	"Nee Nee Neeyanai"	Srikanth Deva	Mahathi
2016	Amma Kanakku	"Kadavul Padaippil"	Ilaiyaraaja	
2016	Bayam Oru Payanam	"Maayavi Penne"	Y. R. Prasad	Saindhavi
2016	Kidaari	"Pagaivanukku Arulvaai"	Darbuka Siva	
2016	Rekka	"Pollapayya"	D. Imman	Shweta Mohan
2016	Kadalai	"Ver Varai"	Sam C. S.	
2016	Virumandikkum Sivanandikkum	"Ullankai Adikkudhu"	R. Devarajan	Priyanka
2016	Parandhu Sella Vaa	"Yaarume Thaniyaai"	Joshua Sridhar	
2016	Balle Vellaiyathevaa	"Kan Vatchutta"	Darbuka Siva	Sanjana Divaker Kalmanje
2016	Namadhu	"Namadhandro"	Mahesh Shankar	
2017	Kaatru Veliyidai	"Tango Kelayo"	A. R. Rahman	Diwakar
2017	Kaatru Veliyidai	"Azhagiye"	A. R. Rahman	Arjun Chandy, Jonita Gandhi
2017	Vanamagan	"Yemma Yea Azhagamma"	Harris Jayaraj	Bombay Jayashree
2017	Spyder	"Ciciliya Ciciliya"	Harris Jayaraj	Shakthisree Gopalan
2017	Ka Ka Ka: Aabathin Arikuri	"Sila Sil Sila"	Amrith	Chinmayi
2017	Enakku Vaaitha Adimaigal	"Kannadi Poovukku"	Santhosh Dhayanidhi	Jonita Gandhi
2017	Ennodu Vilayadu	"Kaalai Theneer"	A. Moses	Gowri Lakshmi
2017	Ennodu Vilayadu	"Enakaanavaa"	A. Moses	
2017	Pagadi Aattam	"Vachale Kaiye"	Karthik Raja	
2017	Kadugu	"Kadugalavu"	S. N. Arunagiri	
2017	Paambhu Sattai	"Nee Uravaaga"	Ajeesh	Shreya Ghoshal
2017	8 Thottakkal	"Nee Illai Endraal"	KS Sundaramurthy	Vandana Srinivasan
2017	Munnodi	"Enna Idhu"	K. Venkat Prabu Shankar	
2017	Adhagappattathu Magajanangalay	"Andha Pulla Manasa"	D. Imman	
2017	Gemini Ganeshanum Suruli Raajanum	"Aahaa Aahaa"	D. Imman	Shreya Ghoshal
2017	Enbathettu	"Asaiyaadha Kaatru"	Dayarathnam	
2017	Paakanum Pola Irukku	"Vennilave"	Aruldev	
2017	Savarikkadu	"Thuyaram Koottam"	Indiravarman AT	
2017	Kootathil Oruthan	"Innum Enna Solla"	Nivas K. Prasanna	B. Mac
2017	Sathura Adi 3500	"Thottute Thottute"	Ganesh Raghavendra	
2017	Puriyatha Puthir	"Mazhaikkulle"	Sam C. S.	Shreya Ghoshal
2017	Kalavu Thozhirchalai	"Thanjavuru Paaru"	Shyam Benjamin	
2018	Nimir	"Nenjil Mamazhai"	B. Ajaneesh Loknath	Shweta Mohan
2018	Nimir	"Yaenadi"	Darbuka Siva	
2018	Padaiveeran	"Mattikkitten"	Karthik Raja	Rita
2018	Sollividava	"Rama Rama"	Jassie Gift	Anitha Karthikeyan
2018	Iravukku Aayiram Kangal	"Yaen Penne Neeyum"	Sam C. S.	
2018	Abhiyum Anuvum	"Saregama"	Dharan	Shashaa Tirupati
2018	Kaalakkoothu	"Kanna Katti"	Justin Prabhakaran	Latha Krishna
2018	Mr. Chandramouli	"Theeraadho Vali"	Sam C. S.	
2018	Enga Kattula Mazhai	"Oor Mutham"	Srivijay	Suganya
2018	Merku Thodarchi Malai	"Andarathil Thonguthamma"	Ilaiyaraaja	
2018	Thimiru Pudichavan	"Nee Unnai Matrikondal"	Vijay Antony	
2018	Adanga Maru	"Pachai Dhrogangal"	Sam C. S.	
2019	Dev	"She is My Girl"	Harris Jayaraj	Christopher Stanley, Mahathi
2019	July Kaatril	"Vaa Alaipol"	Joshua Sridhar	Varshini Muralikrishnan
2019	7	"En Aasai Macha"	Chaitan Bharadwaj	Deepthi Parthasarathy
2019	7	"Udhiranae Nee"	Chaitan Bharadwaj	Alisha Thomas
2019	Sarvam Thaala Mayam	"Sarvam Thaala Mayam"	A. R. Rahman	Arjun Chandy
2019	Sindhubaadh	"Nenja Unakkaga"	Yuvan Shankar Raja	
2019	Saaho	"Mazhaiyum Theeyum"	Guru Randhawa	Shakthisree Gopalan
2019	Sye Raa Narasimha Reddy	"Paaraai Narasimha Nee Paaraai"	Amit Trivedi	Shankar Mahadevan, Anurag Kulkarni
2019	Sye Raa Narasimha Reddy	"Suvaasamaagum thaesame"	Amit Trivedi	
2019	Bow Bow	"Hey Kuchi Rakkamma"	Marc D Muse	
2019	Champion	"Vaa Maganey"	Arrol Corelli	
2019	Zhagaram	"Gilli Bambaram Goli"	Dharan	Shweta Mohan
2019	Natpuna Ennanu Theriyuma	"Andhar Bulty"	Dharan	Alisha Thomas
2019	Vennila Kabaddi Kuzhu 2	"Otha Parvayil"	V. Selvaganesh	
2019	Capmaari	"Naan Oruthikitta"	Siddharth Vipin	
2020	Kaadan	"Thaalaattu Paadum"	Shantanu Moitra	
2020	Kaadan	"Chinna China"	Shantanu Moitra	
2020	College Kumar	"Baari Baari"	Qutub-E-Kripa	Pavan, Abhijith Rao
2020	Gypsy	"Manamengum Maaya Oonjaal"	Santhosh Narayanan	Dhee, Ananthu
2021	Galatta Kalyanam	"Murali Mogha"	A. R. Rahman	K. S. Chithra
2021	Thaen	"Alli Poo"	Sanath Bharathwaj	
2021	Iruvar Ullam	"Kadhal Kiliye"	Vijay Antony	
2021	Kodiyil Oruvan	"Naan Varuven"	Nivas K Prasanna	Nivas K Prasanna
2021	Jango	"Anale Anale"	Ghibran	
2021	Thalli Pogathey	"Nee Varaindha Ooviyam"	Gopi Sunder	
2022	Sila Nerangalil Sila Manidhargal	"Vizhi Pesum"	Radhan	Chinmayi
2022	Veerapandiyapuram	"Ammamma"	Jai	Archana Sabesh
2022	1945	"Yennadi Seidhaai"	Yuvan Shankar Raja	Priya Mali
2022	Panni Kutty	"Adiye Adiye"	K	
2022	Yenni Thuniga	"Yennadiye Yennadiye"	Sam C. S.	Srinisha Jayaseelan
2022	Ponniyin Selvan: I	"Ilayanenjil" (BGM)	A. R. Rahman	Aravind Srinivas, D. Sathyaprakash
2022	The Warriorr	"Dhada Dhada"	Devi Sri Prasad	
2022	Iravin Nizhal	"Bejara"	A. R. Rahman	Bamba Bakya
2022	Sita Ramam	"Kannukulle"	Vishal Chandrashekhar	Sinduri
2023	Ponniyin Selvan: II	"Chinanjiru Nilave"	A. R. Rahman	
2023	Ponniyin Selvan: II	"Veera Raja Veera" (additional vocals)	A. R. Rahman	Shankar Mahadevan, K. S. Chithra, Harini
2023	Chandramukhi 2	"Thori Bori"	M M Keeravani	Amala Chebolu
2023	Bommai Nayagi	"Vaanam Thaiyaga"	KS Sundaramurthy	
2023	Ariyavan	"Naana Paranthena"	Ved Shankar	Vandana Srinivasan
2023	1982 Anbarasin Kaadhal	"Vellinilave"	S. Chinthamani	
2023	Karumegangal Kalaigindrana	"Mannikka Sonnen"	G. V. Prakash Kumar	
2023	Karumegangal Kalaigindrana	"Niyayaththai Sonnen"	G. V. Prakash Kumar	
2023	Iraivan	"Nanbha"	Yuvan Shankar Raja	
2023	Raid	"Azhagu Chellam"	Sam C. S.	Bhuvana Ananth
2024	Siren	"Kannamma"	G. V. Prakash Kumar	
2024	Pon Ondru Kanden	"Un Azhagai Rasithu"	Yuvan Shankar Raja	
2024	Election	"Mannavan"	Govind Vasantha	Shweta Mohan
2024	Andhagan	"Yosichi Yosichi"	Santhosh Narayanan	
2024	Amaran	"Hey Minnale"	G. V. Prakash Kumar	Shweta Mohan
2025	Nesippaya	"Solo Violin"	Yuvan Shankar Raja	
2025	Seesaw	"Kanale"	Charan Kumar	Gayathry Rajiv
2025	Madraskaran	"Yaendi"	Sam C. S.	
2025	Veera Dheera Sooran	"Kalloorum"	G. V. Prakash Kumar	Shweta Mohan
2025	Gajaana	"Kagidha Megam"	Achu Rajamani	
2025	Rajaputhiran	"Aagasatha Thottachi"	AIS Nawfal Raja	K. S. Chithra
2025	3BHK	"Oru Kana"	Amrit Ramnath	
2025	Kumaara Sambavam	"Idhu Devadhai Nerame"	Achu Rajamani	Saindhavi
2025	Aayiram Poo	"Por Paravai"	Midhun Narayanan	Nithya Mammen
2026	Lucky the Superstar	"Niraa Maya"	Hesham Abdul Wahab	
2026	Youth	"Thanga Magan"	G.V. Prakash Kumar	Sruthy Sivadas
2026	Ramayana: Part 1	"Jai Jai Rama"	A. R. Rahman	Chinmayi Sripada

=== 2009 ===
Film	Song	Music director	Co-singer(s)	Language
Vandae Maatharam	"Vande"	D.Imman	Chinmayi, D Imman, Vijay Yesudas, Krish, Benny Dayal, Haricharan, Harish Raghavendra, Mathangi, Pop Salini, Sreelekha Parthasarathy, Suchithra Karthik	Malayalam
Sankham	"Mahalakshmi"	S. Thaman	Karthik, Ranjith, Megha, Janani, Priya Himesh, Divya, Geetha Madhuri, Rita	Telugu

=== 2010 ===
Film	Song	Music director	Co-singer(s)	Language
Aain Kasargod Khader Bhai	"Again"	Ratheesh Vegha	Ratheesh Vegha	Malayalam
Prithvi	"Haagella Nee Nodabeda"	Manikanth Kadri	Anitha Karthikeyan	Kannada
The Thriller	"Priyankari"	Dharan	Mamta Mohandas	Malayalam
Nene Ambani (D)	"Evaree Ammayani Adiga"	Yuvan Shankar Raja		Telugu
Happy Happy Ga	"Navvalante"	Mani Sharma	Rita Thyagarajan	Telugu

=== 2011 ===
Film	Song	Music director	Lyricist	Co-singer(s)	language
100% Love	"Panthamekkado"	Devi Sri Prasad	Chandrabose	Shweta Mohan	Telugu
100% Love	"Bharya Bhartala"	Devi Sri Prasad	Chandrabose	Shweta Mohan	Telugu
Aakasame Haddu	"Kalanaina"	Anand		Anjana Sowmya	Telugu
Aakasame Haddu	"Em Neram"	Anand			Telugu
Solo	"Naa Prema Kathaku"	Mani Sharma	Ramajogayya Sastry		Telugu
Bodyguard	"Jiya Jaley"	S. Thaman	Ramajogayya Sastry		Telugu
Bodyguard	"Enduko"	S. Thaman	Ramajogayya Sastry	Shweta Pandit	Telugu
Panjaa	"Ela Ela Naalo"	Yuvan Shankar Raja	Chandrabose	Shweta Pandit	Telugu
Veedinthe (D)	"Pasivadi Padamai"	Yuvan Shankar Raja	Chandrabose		Telugu
Vaadu Veedu (D)	"Rani Vasthondi"	Yuvan Shankar Raja	Anantha Sriram		Telugu
1947: A Love Story (D)	"Swechaga"	G. V. Prakash Kumar	Chandrabose		Telugu

=== 2012 ===
Film	Song	Music director	Co-singer(s)	Language
Hero	"Mayathae"	Gopi Sunder	Chinmayi	Malayalam
Trivandrum Lodge	"Theyyaram"	M Jayachandran	Sujatha Mohan, M Jayachandran	Malayalam
Manthrikan	"Azhakeke"	S Balakrishnan	Gopakumar	Malayalam
Padmasree Bharat Dr. Saroj Kumar	"Mozhikalum Mounangalum"	Deepak Dev		Malayalam
Mallu Singh	"Oru Kinginikkaattu Vannu"	M. Jayachandran	Navraj Hans	Malayalam
Ustad Hotel	"Vaathilil Aa Vaathilil"	Gopi Sunder		Malayalam
Endukante... Premanta!	"Nee Choopule"	G. V. Prakash Kumar	K. S. Chithra	Telugu
Andala Rakshasi	"Yemito"	Radhan		Telugu
Scene 1 Nammude Veedu	"Ninne Thedi Vannu"	Ratheesh Vega	Saindhavi	Malayalam
916	"Kiliye Cherukiliye" "Chenthamara Theno"	M. Jayachandran	K.S. Chithra; Mridula Warrier	Malayalam
Mr. Nookayya	"Oke Oka Jeevitham"	Yuvan Shankar Raja		Telugu

=== 2013 ===
Film	Song	Music director	Co-singer(s)	Language
Priyathama Neevachata Kusalama	"Evoo Evoo"	Sai Karthik		Telugu
Ladies and Gentleman	"Pranayame"	Ratheesh Vega	Saindhavi	Malayalam
Googly	"Googly Gandasare" "Yeno Yeno Aagide"	Joshua Sridhar		Kannada
Neram	"Kaatru Veesum"	Rajesh Murugesan		Malayalam
Yaaruda Mahesh	"Pudhu Paarvai"	Gopi Sunder	Priya Himesh	Telugu
KQ	"Azhakolum Maariville"	Stephen Devassy	Saptaparna Chakraborty	Malayalam
Kammath & Kammath	"Coimbatore"	M.Jayachandran	Madhu Balakrishnan, Vijay Yesudas	Malayalam
Lucky Star	"Anchithalpoo"	Ratheesh Vegha		Malayalam
Orissa	"Meghame"	Ratheesh Vegha		Malayalam
Nambothiri Yuvavu @ 43	"Anthimegha"		Neeraj	Malayalam
Pattam Pole	"Mazhaye Thoomazhaye" "Hey Vennila"	M. Jayachandran	Mridula Warrier	Malayalam
London Bridge	"Kannaadi Vaathil"	Rahul Raj		Malayalam
Ezhu Sundara Rathrikal	"Koode erikkam"	Prasanth Pillai	Gayathri Asokan	Malayalam

=== 2014 ===
Film	Song	Music director	Co-singer(s)	Language
Picket 43	"Manjormakal"	Gopi Sundar		Malayalam
Bangalore Days	"Ethu Kari Raavilum"	Gopi Sunder		Malayalam
Hara	"Birugaali"	Jassie Gift	Shreya Ghoshal	Kannada
Manglish	"Daffodle Poove"	Gopi Sunder	Jyothsna	Malayalam
Manam	"Edi Prema Prema"	Anup Rubens		Telugu
Samsaaram Aarogyathinu Haanikaram	"Podhum Nee Ini" "Ullilunnil"	Sean Roldan	Chennai Strings	Malayalam
Pradhi Nayagan	"Naadaga Gaanangal"	A. R. Rahman	K. S. Chithra	Malayalam
Govindudu Andarivadele	"Kokkokodi"	Yuvan Shankar Raja	Karthik (singer), M. M. Manasi, Rita	Telugu
Iyobinte Pusthakam	"Raave"	Neha Nair & Yakzan Gary Pereira	Neha Nair	Malayalam
Mylanchy Monchulla Veedu	"Puthanilijik"	Afsal	Radhika	Malayalam
Homely Meals	"Parannu"	Satraj		Malayalam
Cousins	"Neeyen Vennila" "We are Cousins" "Kaipoothathum"	M. Jayachandran	Chinmayi	Malayalam

=== 2015 ===
Film	Song	Music director	Co-singer(s)	Language
Gopala Gopala	"Bhaje Bhaaje"	Anup Rubens	Anup Rubens	Telugu
Malli Malli Idi Rani Roju	"Varinche Prema"	Gopi Sunder	Gopi Sunder	Telugu
Mandya to Mumbai	"Kelamma Chinnamma"	Charan Raj	Mridula Warrier	Kannada
Madhura Naranga	"Orunaal"	Sooraj Santhosh	Sreejith	Malayalam
Premam	"Paatonnu"	Rajesh Murugesan	Rajesh	Malayalam
Manoharudu	"Poolane Kunukeyamanta"	A. R. Rahman	Shreya Ghoshal	Telugu
Tamasha	"Chali Kahaani"	A. R. Rahman	Sukhwinder Singh, Haripriya	Hindi
Style	"Chenthamara Chundil"	Jassie Gift	Shweta Mohan	Malayalam
Jo and the Boy	"Ponveyil"	Rahul Subrahmanian		Malayalam
VindhyaMarutham	"Varamanukona"	"Vamsi, Hari"	Ala, Hari	Telugu

=== 2016 ===
Film	Song	Music director	Co-singer(s)	Language
Krishna Gaadi Veera Prema Gaadha	"Nuvvante Nanavvu"	Vishal Chandrasekhar	Sinduri Vishal	Telugu
Jessie	"Male Banthu"	J. Anoop Seelin	Samanvitha Sharma	Kannada
Jessie	"Modala Notadalli"	J. Anoop Seelin	Samanvitha Sharma	Kannada
Oopiri	"Pothaama"	Gopi Sunder	Anirudh Ravichander	Telugu
Kalam	"Puthu Puthu"	Prakash Nikki	Thor Nishanlee, Tha Mystro, Mark Thomas & Prakash Nikki	Telugu
Pelli Choopulu	"Merise Merise"	Vivek Sagar	Pranavi Acharya	Telugu
Majnu	"Oorike Ala"	Gopi Sundar		Telugu
Style	"Chenthamara"	Jassie Gift	Swetha Mohan	Malayalam
Valleem Thetti Pulleem Thetti	"Pularkkalam"	Sooraj S Kurup	Madonna Sebastian	Malayalam
Darvinte Parinamam	"Kaathangal"	Shankar Sharma		Malayalam
Anuraga Karikkin Vellam	"Manogatham"	Prsanth Pillai	Mathangi	Malayalam
Happy Wedding	"Oro Nokkil"	Arun Muraleedharan		Malayalam
Anghanethanne Nethave Anjettennam Pinnale	"Mallika Poombodi"	Sangeetha	M.Jayachandran	Malayalam
Vismayam/Manamantha	"Namellam"	Mahesh		Malayalam/Telugu

=== 2017 ===
Film	Song	Music director	Co-singer(s)	Language
Ezra	"Lailakame"	Rahul Raj		Malayalam
Comrade in America	"Kannil Kannil"	Gopi Sundar	Sayanora Philip	Malayalam
Cheliyaa	"Hamsaro"	A. R. Rahman	Arjun Chandy, Jonita Gandhi	Telugu
Adventures of Omanakuttan	"vaarminnal"	Arun Muraleedharan		Malayalam
Oru Cinemakkaran	"Ozhukiyozhuki "	Bijibal	Shweta Mohan	Malayalam
Zacharia Pothen Jeevichirippundu	"Ennu"	Dhibu Nainan Thomas		Malayalam
Chembarathipoo	"Akaleyo"	AR Rakesh	Anie Amie	Malayalam
Naval Enna Jewel	"Rakadalal"	M.Jayachandran	Shreya Ghoshal	Malayalam
Ninnu Kori	"Hey Badhulu Cheppavey"	Gopi Sundar		Telugu
Spyder	"Ciciliya Ciciliya"	Harris Jayaraj	Shakthisree Gopalan	Telugu
Hello	"Merise Merise" "Thalachi Thalachi"	Anup Rubens	Srinidhi	Telugu
Masterpiece	"Wake up"	Jyotsna	Deepak Dev	Malayalam

=== 2018 ===
Film	Song	Composer(s)	Writer(s)	Co-singer(s)	language
Abhiyude Kadha Anuvinteyum (D)	"Ninteyomal"	Dharan Kumar	B.K.Harinarayanan	Shweta Mohan	Malayalam
Abhiyude Kadha Anuvinteyum (D)	"Enthino Kanne"	Dharan Kumar	B.K.Harinarayanan		Malayalam
Naam	Alakalay	Sandeep	Shabareesh Varma		Malayalam
Naam	Azhakiyane	Sandeep	Shabareesh Varma	Vijay Yesudas	Malayalam
Chemabarathipoo	Akaleyo	AR Rakesh	Jinil	Amie	Malayalam
Shikkari Shambhu	"Mazhaye"	Sreejith	Santhosh Varma	Roshni	Malayalam
Panchavarnathatha	Panchavarnathatha	M.Jayachandran	Santhosh Varma	Jyotsna	Malayalam
Manasuku Nachindi	"Raa Raa Ilara"	Radhan	Ananta Sriram		Telugu
Kirrak Party	"Dhumdare Dhumdare"	B. Ajaneesh Loknath	Vanamali		Telugu
Kannakkol	"Uchimalai Pullaiyare"	Bobby			Telugu
Pantham	"Ek Dham"	Gopi Sundar	Bhaskarabhatla Ravi Kumar	Rita Thyagarajan	Telugu
Tej I Love You	"Andhamaina Chandhamaama"	Gopi Sundar	Sahiti	Chinmayi	Telugu
Tej I Love You	"Nachuthunnade Vachi"	Gopi Sundar	Pothula Ravikiran		Telugu
Tej I Love You	"Adhe Kannu Needi"	Gopi Sundar	Ramajogayya Sastry		Telugu
Sammohanam	"O Cheli Thaara"	Vivek Sagar			Telugu
Sammohanam	"Oohalu Oorege"	Vivek Sagar			Telugu
RX100	"Reppalaninda"	Chaitan Bharadwaj			Telugu
Old Is Gold	Kavil	Junir	B.K.Harinarayanan	Safeer	Malayalam
Oru Kuttanadan Blog	Mangalyam	Sreenath	B.K.Harinarayanan	Rimi Tomy	Malayalam
Abrahaminte Santhathikal	Mullapoovithalo	Rafeeq Ahamed	Serin		Malayalam
Jeevitham Oru Mukhamoodi	Etho Mounam	VS Abhilash	Nahoom Abraham	Shweta Mohan	Malayalam

=== 2019 ===
Film	Song	Composer(s)	Writer(s)	Co-singer(s)	Language
Neermathalam Poothakalam	"Vennilavin Thaliralle"	Sheron Roy Gomez	S Chandra		Malayalam
Neermathalam Poothakalam	"Chenthamara Poovin"	Sheron Roy Gomez	S Chandra		Malayalam
Anathashalabhangal	"Kathil"	Mithun Raj	Sreekanth J Vazhapulli, Sanil Kumar D		Malayalam
Safar	"Venmukile"	Noble	Noble	Chitra Arun	Malayalam
Marconi Mathai	"Nanba"	M Jayachandran		Ganga, Nincy Vincent, Ala Balan, Yazin Nizar	Malayalam
7	"Idivarakepudu"	Chaitan Bharadwaj	Pulagam Chinnarayana	Deepti Pardasaradi	Telugu
7	"Varshinchana"	Chaitan Bharadwaj	Pulagam Chinnarayana	Alisha Thomas	Telugu
Viswasam (D)	"Vaanae Vaanae"	D. Imman	Bhuvana Chandra	Vandana Srinivasan	Telugu
Hippi	"Padipoya Neetho"	Nivas K. Prasanna	Ananta Sriram		Telugu
Ormayil Oru Shishiram	"Poothennalin"	Manu Manjith	Ranjith Raj	Merin	Malayalam
Sarvam Thaala Mayam (D)	"Sarvam Thaala Mayam"	A. R. Rahman	Rakendu Mouli	Arjun Chandy	Telugu
Jodi	"Cheliya Maate"	Phani Kalyan	Ananta Sriram	Sameera Baradwaj	Telugu
Guna 369	"Tholi Parichayama"	Chaitanya Raja	Subham Vishwanadh		Telugu
Sita	"Evaridi Evaridi"	Anup Rubens	Lakshmi Bhupal		Telugu
Saaho	"Ye Chota Nuvvunna"	Guru Randhawa	Krishna Kanth	Tulsi Kumar	Telugu
Saaho (D)	"Ekaantha Thaarame"	Guru Randhawa	Vinayak Sasikumar	Shakthisree Gopalan	Malayalam
Bandobasth (D)	"Hey Amigo"	Harris Jayaraj	Vanamali	Jonita Gandhi	Telugu
Sye Raa Narasimha Reddy	"Jaago Narasimha"	Amit Trivedi	Sirivennela Seetharama Sastry	Shankar Mahadevan, Anurag Kulkarni	Telugu
Sye Raa Narasimha Reddy	"Swashaalone Deshame"	Amit Trivedi	Chandrabose		Telugu
Sye Raa Narasimha Reddy (D)	"Jaago Narasimha Jagore"	Amit Trivedi	Azad Varada Raj	Shankar Mahadevan, Anurag Kulkarni	Kannada
Sye Raa Narasimha Reddy (D)	"Shwaasadallu Deshave"	Amit Trivedi	Azad Varada Raj		Kannada
Sye Raa Narasimha Reddy (D)	"Unaroo Narasimhapperumaale"	Amit Trivedi	Siju Thuravoor	Shankar Mahadevan, Anurag Kulkarni	Malayalam
Sye Raa Narasimha Reddy (D)	"Jeevanaaya Dheshame"	Amit Trivedi	Siju Thuravoor		Malayalam
Oronnonnara Pranayakadha	"Udalodu"	Anand		Chinmayi	Malayalam
Undiporaadey	"Cheliya Nee Paluke"	Sabbu Varghese	Ramanjaneyulu		Telugu
Raagala 24 Gantallo	"Namo Namo"	Raghu Kunche	Srimani		Telugu
Pathinettam Padi	"Anganana"	AH Kaashif	B.K.Hari		Malayalam
Pathinettam Padi	"Bhimapalli"	AH Kaashif	Vinayak Sashikumar	Shahbaz Aman	Malayalam
Thrissur Pooram	"Sakhiye"	Ratheesh Vegha	B.K.Harinarayanan		Malayalam
Adukkalayil Paniyund	Vinnil Minnum	Maneesh raveendran	Sangeetha		Malayalam
Jack & Daniel	Ee Vazhi	Shaan Rahman	B.K.Harinarayanan		Malayalam

=== 2020 ===
Film	Song	Composer(s)	Writer(s)	Co-singer(s)	Language
Varane Avashyamund	"Mullapoove"	Santhosh Varma	Alphonse Joseph		Malayalam
Life Anubhavunchu Raja	"Idhemito"	Ram			Telugu
Aranya	"Chitikese Aa Chirugaali"	Shantanu Moitra	Vanamali		Telugu
Aranya	"Vellu Vellu"	Shantanu Moitra			Telugu
Aranya	"Hrudhayame"	Shantanu Moitra			Telugu
3 Monkeys	"Badhule Leni"				Telugu
College Kumar	"Baari Baari"	Qutub-E-Kripa	Sri Mani	Abhijith Rao	Telugu

=== 2021 ===
Film	Song	Composer(s)	Writer(s)	Co-singer(s)	Language
Nizhal	"Innale Mellane..."	Sachin N Bhattathiri	Sooraj S. Kurup		Malayalam
Runam	"Yemito Ee Sambaram"	S. V. Mallik Teja	S. V. Mallik Teja	Chinmayi	Telugu
Backpackers	"Kaatin"	Jayaraj	Sachin	Archana	Malayalam
Kanabadutaledu	"Tholisari Nene"	Madhu Ponnas	Chandrabose		Telugu
Love Story	Ay Pilla	Pavan CH	Chaitanya Pingali		Telugu
Pelli SandaD	"Premante Enti"	M. M. Keeravani	Chandrabose	Shweta Pandit	Telugu
Manchi Rojulochaie	"Title Song"	Anup Rubens	Kasarla Shyam	Sravani	Telugu
Atrangi Re	"Tera Rang"	A. R. Rahman	Irshad Kamil	Shreya Ghoshal	Hindi
Bheemante Vazhi	"Bheemante "	Vishnu Vijay	Muhsin Parari		Malayalam

=== 2022 ===
Film	Song	Composer(s)	Writer(s)	Co-singer(s)	Language
By Two Love	"Pogadiro Ranga"	B. Ajaneesh Loknath	Hari Santhosh	Chinmayi	Kannada
Meri Awaaz Suno	"Eeran Nila"	M.Jayachandran	B.k.Harinarayanan		Malayalam
The Warriorr	"Dhada Dhada"	Devi Sri Prasad	Sri Mani		Telugu
Etharkkum Thunindhavan	"Churru Churranni"	D. Imman	Vanamali	Srinidhi	Telugu
Makal	"Mayalle"	Vishnu Vijay	B.K.Harinarayanan		Malayalam
Pathaam Valavu	"Elamalakadinullil"	Ranjin Raj	Vinayak Sasikumar		Malayalam
Thallumaala	"Ole Melody"	Vishnu Vijay	Muhsin Parari	Benny Dayal, Salim Kumar, Vishnu Vijay	Malayalam
Kantara (D)	"Andhaala Nadhive"	B. Ajaneesh Loknath	Bhaskarabhatla Ravikumar	Chinmayi	Telugu

=== 2023 ===
Film	Song	Composer(s)	Writer(s)	Co-singer(s)	Language
PS-2 (Telugu) (D)	"Minnanchula Vennelaa"	A. R. Rahman	Ramajogayya Sastry	Solo	Telugu
Kushi (D)	"Aradhya"	Hesham Abdul Wahab	V. Nagendra Prasad	Chinmayi	Kannada
Month of Madhu	"Naa Tholi Chinnari Premo"	Achu Rajamani	Krishna Kanth	Aditi Bhavaraju	Telugu
Vela	"Paathakal"	Sam C. S.	Anwar Ali	Solo	Malayalam
Ranjith Cinema	"Kannilothiri Neram"	Midhun Ashokan	Rafeeq Ahmed	Solo	Malayalam

=== 2024 ===
Film	Song	Composer	Writer	Co-singer(s)	Language
Sharathulu Varthisthai	"Pala Pittale"	Arun Chiluveru	Mallegoda Ganga Prasad	Bhargavi Pillai	Telugu
Operation Raavan	"Chandamaama Kathalonaa"	Saravana Vasudevan	Purnachary	Geetha Madhuri	Telugu
Paarijatha Parvam	"Ninginunchi Jaare"	Ree	Kittu Vissapragada	Lipsika	Telugu
Music Shop Murthy	"Arere Kaalam"	Pavan	Mahesh Poloju		Telugu

=== 2025 ===
Film	Song	Composer	Writer	Co-singer(s)	Language
3BHK	"Oka Kala" (Telugu) (D)	Amrit Ramnath	Rakendu Mouli		Telugu
War 2 (D)	"Nuvvunte Naatho"	Pritam	Chandrabose		Telugu
Chaurya Paatham	"Telisi Telisi"	Davzand	Kalyanachakravarthy Tripuraneni	Shweta Mohan	Telugu
Solo Boy	"Krishnudikentho Priyamaina"	Judah Sandhy	Kalyanachakravarthy Tripuraneni		Telugu
Sasivadane	"Sasivadane Title Song"	Saravana Vasudevan	Kittu Vissapragada	Chinmayi Sripada	Telugu
Premistunnaa	"Aha Adhemito"	Siddharth Salur	Venigalla Rambabu	Ramya Behara	Telugu
Marutha	"Kanase Karagibidu"	Jassie Gift	S. Narayan		Kannada

=== 2026 ===
Film	Song	Composer	Writer	Co-singer(s)	Language
Nari Nari Naduma Murari	"Raju Gaari Pelli Ro"	Vishal Chandrashekhar	Ramajogayya Sastry		Telugu
Ramayana: Part 1	"Jai Jai Rama"	A. R. Rahman	Vinayak Sasikumar	Amritha Rajan	Malayalam

== Non-film songs ==
=== 2021 ===
Film	Song	Composer(s)	Lyricist(s)	Co-artist(s)
Independent Song	"Endhan Nenjodu"	Drummerprasad	Drummerprasad	Solo

=== 2022 ===
Film	Song	Language	Composer(s)	Lyricist(s)	Co-artist(s)
Independent Song	"Oh Pilla"	Telugu	The Fantasia Men	Ramajogayya Sastry	Bunny Vox
Independent Song	"Aedhu Nijam Enn Kannmani"	Tamil	Subhash Anand	S.P.Hosimin	Chinmayi Sripada

== Television ==
Year	Show	Role	Language	Network
2024–Present	Super Star	Judge	Malayalam	Amrita TV
