= Paiyaa =

2010 film by N. Lingusamy

- Theatrical release poster
- Directed by: N. Lingusamy
- Written by: N. Lingusamy; Brinda Sarathy (dialogues)
- Produced by: N. Subash Chandra Bose; N. Lingusamy
- Starring: Karthi; Tamannaah Bhatia
- Cinematography: R. Madhi
- Edited by: Anthony
- Music by: Yuvan Shankar Raja
- Production company: Thirrupathi Brothers
- Distributed by: Cloud Nine Movies
- Release date: 2 April 2010
- Running time: 151 minutes
- Country: India
- Language: Tamil

Paiyaa (transl. Boy) is a 2010 Indian Tamil-language romantic action-adventure film directed by N. Lingusamy and produced by N. Subash Chandra Bose under the banner Thirrupathi Brothers. The film stars Karthi and Tamannaah Bhatia in the lead roles, while Milind Soman, Jagan and Sonia Deepti appear in supporting roles. The music was composed by Yuvan Shankar Raja, and the cinematography and editing were handled by R. Madhi and Anthony, respectively.

Following a lengthy pre-production phase, during which the film underwent major changes in its main cast and technical crew, shooting began in December 2008 at various locations throughout South India, most notably in Karnataka, Andhra Pradesh, and Maharashtra.

Paiyaa was released on 2 April 2010 to positive reviews from critics and became a blockbuster box office success. The Telugu version titled Awara was released on 21 May 2010. The film was remade in Kannada in 2014 as Ajith.

== Plot ==
Shiva is a carefree young man who stays in Bangalore in search of a job and has a loyal group of friends. One day, Shiva sees a beautiful woman named Charulatha "Charu," who is also looking for a job. Shiva is immediately attracted to Charu and subsequently spots her on various occasions and follows her. Shiva waits at the railway station to pick up a friend and the owner of a Mitsubishi Lancer. Shiva is confronted by a tense Charu, along with a Telugu-speaking man. They assume that Shiva is a cab driver and ask him to take them to Chennai. An excited Shiva accepts the offer and takes them.

While stopping to refuel the car, Charu suddenly requests Shiva to drive, leaving the man behind; Shiva does as she wishes and takes off. After unsuccessful efforts to reach the airport and railway station, Charu asks Shiva to take her to Mumbai. Shiva instantly agrees. He tries to get into a conversation with Charu, who initially refuses to talk, but eventually gives in and tells him about her background. It comes to light that Charu's mother, who had always supported her daughter, died after a violent altercation with her father. Since then, her father has tried to force Charu to marry an unknown man of his choice. Not willing to bow to her father's wishes, Charu had escaped from home, but was later found by her father's business partner named Jayaraman. He was about to take her to register the marriage arranged by her father when Charu tried to escape, leaving him behind at the filling station.

Charu wants to leave for Mumbai to stay at her grandmother's home. However, Charu is being followed by a gang, led by a furious Telugu-speaking lady. Shiva manages to lose the pursuers and decides to change the route, but encounters a second gang. Shiva realises that this gang is not following Charu, but himself as they are the henchmen of a Mumbai-based gangster, Baali. Shiva recalls an incident that happened some years ago in Mumbai, when he stayed there at his friend Poochi's house. Shiva had beaten one of Baali's men, who had attacked him, and later Baali himself, not knowing about him and his reputation in the city, and returned to Bangalore. Both gangs are following the couple to achieve their own ends.

After reaching Mumbai and experiencing a series of events, they end up at Poochi's house. Poochi finds out where the grandmother lives, and Shiva brings Charu there. Unable to bear the thought that the journey is complete, Shiva leaves silently, only to find Charu on the road. After hesitation, Charu reveals that her relatives had spoken ill about her parents, which prompted her to leave. While in a state of doubt, they are attacked by Baali's gang, who have teamed up with Jayaraman. Shiva saves Charu from the goons. While on their way back to Bangalore, Shiva's friends arrive to meet him. Priya, whom Shiva has called often, tells Charu of his feelings for her. Charu reciprocates Shiva's love, as she too has fallen for him during the journey.

== Cast ==
- Karthi as Shiva
- Tamannaah Bhatia as Charulatha "Charu"
- Milind Soman as Baali, a gangster based in Mumbai
- Jagan as Poochi, a young simpleton and friend of Shiva, who lives in Mumbai
- Sonia Deepti as Priya, Shiva's best friend
- Jasper as the head goon of the Telugu gang
- Omar Lateef as Siddharth, Shiva's friend
- Darshan Jariwala as Charulatha's uncle in Mumbai
- Sujata Kumar as Sharadha, Charulatha's grandmother
- Puneet Tejwani as Mahesh Vinayak, a man who asks for a lift
- Arpit Ranka as Baali's henchman
- Rajkumar Kanojia as Baali's henchman
- Daniel Annie Pope as a Telugu gang member
- Babu as a Telugu gang member

== Production ==
=== Development ===
In September 2007, while working on Bheemaa, a film starring Vikram, Lingusamy announced that Karthi would star in his next venture to be launched in January 2008. He said that he had written a story "suitable for Karthi", further adding that it would be "an action oriented film". The following month, sources suggested that he was planning a bilingual project, filming simultaneously in Tamil and Telugu with Karthi and Ram Charan, respectively. However, in early November, reports claimed that Vishal would portray the protagonist after Lingusamy had considered Jayam Ravi for the lead character. The reports proved to be false and Karthi was confirmed as the lead actor of the film.

The film failed to begin production in January 2008, with sources reporting in March that Lingusamy was still working on the script. The film was yet to be titled. It was to feature the main crew members of Bheemaa, including music director Harris Jayaraj, cinematographer R. D. Rajasekhar and editor Anthony. Lingusamy later announced the film with an entirely new crew; Yuvan Shankar Raja replaced Jayaraj as the film's music composer, and R. Madhi was selected as the cinematographer, after Rajasekhar had opted out of the project as he was busy working on Jaggubhai. Lingusamy chose Priya Manikandan, wife of cinematographer V. Manikandan, as the chief costume designer, for whom Paiyaa would be her first film project. Lingusamy further revealed that the film would be produced by his home production studio Thirrupathi Brothers and denied that it was a remake of a Telugu film. Lingusamy disclosed later that he had written two scripts, out of which Karthi eventually chose Paiyaa, because he wanted to do an "urban love story" after two successive roles as a ruffian. Initially titled as Kuthirai, it was later renamed as Paiyaa, which was considered a tentative, working title only. Karthi said he was " ... dying to start shooting for Paiyaa " and to " ... wear good clothes ... and he accepted the film because he " ... desperately wanted to play a cool dude on screen.

The filming was supposed to begin in August 2008. However, due to the slow progress of Karthi's ongoing project, Aayirathil Oruvan, Paiyaa was postponed several times, since Karthi needed to maintain the continuity of his looks for his role in Aayirathil Oruvan. Its producer Ravindran complained at the Tamil Film Producers Council that Karthi was trying to change his look and move on to Paiyaa before finishing his commitments, which forced Lingusamy to readjust the schedules. The shooting finally began in December 2008. The film's music was released in November 2009 along with the trailer. In late 2009, after finishing the filming of Paiyaa, Lingusamy disclosed his plans of remaking the film in Telugu and Hindi as well. Later, as Yuganikki Okkadu, the Telugu dubbed version of Karthi's Aayirathil Oruvan, emerged as successful in Andhra Pradesh, the team instead decided to dub and release the film as Awara in Telugu to cash in on Karthi's new-found popularity in the state. In March 2010, the film's distribution rights were acquired by Dayanidhi Azhagiri's Cloud Nine Movies.

=== Casting ===
In July 2008, actress Nayanthara was signed for the female lead role in Paiyaa for a record salary of ₹1 crore. Speaking about the issue, the director admitted that she was one of his favourite actress and he liked her performance in Yaaradi Nee Mohini. He also quoted: "The way her career graph shot up is intriguing. Unlike others her career progressed in reverse gear. She paired up with the superstar during the early years of her career and started accepting roles with heroes of next generation." She also expressed her interest to work in the project. However, plans were made to trim the film's budget due to the recession, and discussions were held with Nayanthara to reduce her salary. The talks resulted in failure and Nayanthara left the project in December 2008. Later, she was accused of cheating the director by refusing to return an advance of ₹15 lakh she had taken before commencement, after walking out of the film. The director filed a complaint with the Tamil Film Producers Council, which decided to ban the actress. Subsequently, Trisha Krishnan was reported to have won the role, before Tamannaah Bhatia was finalised as the female lead, who was signed for ₹80 lakh. Later in December 2008, Milind Soman, who had last appeared in Pachaikili Muthucharam, was signed up for the main antagonist's role, a Mumbai-based don, with other minor antagonists numbering up to 18.

=== Filming ===
After Karthi had completed his film Aayirathil Oruvan, the principal photography for Paiyaa began on 24 December 2008 at a highway near Bangalore. Shooting carried on in and around Bangalore in the following weeks. The film's main portions were extensively shot across some major highways, where the story plays, whilst the climax was filmed in Mumbai, where the journey would also end. The filming also took place in Tamil Nadu, Puducherry, Kerala and Andhra Pradesh.

In May 2009, a street fight was filmed near the Chembarambakkam Lake in Chennai. Later that month, a song ("Suthudhe Suthudhe Boomi"), choreographed by Sabeena Khan, was shot at Prasad Studios in Chennai, where a set had been erected by art director Rajeevan. The song was said to have featured computer graphics and visual effects with which forests and mountain ranges were created. In June 2009, after nearly six months of shooting, more than sixty-five percent of the project was completed, with a song and the climax sequences being the remaining parts to be filmed. A twenty-five-day schedule was to be held in Mumbai and Pune, but the shooting got halted in July due to heavy rains. In October 2009, the final action scenes of the climax involving Karthi and Milind Soman were filmed in Mumbai and its suburbs in a ten-day schedule, following which a rain song ("Adada Mazhaida"), featuring Karthi and Tamannaah, was shot at the Athirappilly waterfalls in Kerala.

== Music ==
The soundtrack for Paiyaa was scored by Yuvan Shankar Raja, collaborating with Lingusamy again after Sandakozhi (2005). The audio launch function was held on 12 February 2010 at the Sathyam Cinemas, Chennai which was attended by many prominent film personalities; director S. Shankar released the soundtrack. The album originally features five songs with vocals by singers Karthik, Benny Dayal, Haricharan, Rahul Nambiar with one female vocal Saindhavi and composer Yuvan Shankar Raja himself. Three songs were reportedly composed and recorded in Singapore. The lyrics were provided by Na. Muthukumar. The album received highly positive reviews and responses from critics and audiences alike and the songs were considered to have played an important role for the film's success.

== Release ==
Paiyaa was initially scheduled for a late 2009 release, but was pushed to 14 January 2010 coinciding with the Pongal. Karthi's second film Aayirathil Oruvan, which was in production for nearly three years, was also planned to release on the same day. According to the Tamil Film Producers Council, two films starring the same actor could not be released on the same day, so Aayirathil Oruvan was given priority, whilst Paiyaa was postponed for 30 days. The release was postponed again for some reasons, before finally hitting the screens on 2 April 2010. The film had its premiere at the Sathyam Cinemas, Chennai. A Telugu dubbed version of the film titled Awara was released on 21 May 2010 in Andhra Pradesh and also received positive response. The film was also dubbed into Hindi as Aakhri Baazi in 2013 for direct telecast on Zee Cinema.

== Reception ==
=== Box office ===
Paiyaa got a solo release on 2 April 2010, coinciding with Good Friday. It earned ₹71 lakh in the opening weekend across Chennai with an average occupancy of 90%. The film grossed ₹3 crore in the first three days and was declared a commercial success within a few days. In the United Kingdom the film was distributed by B4U and was released across six screens, grossing £21,021 in the opening weekend, opening at the 23rd place. Furthermore, in Malaysia, the film opened across 34 screens and collected $349,368 after the second week. In Tamil Nadu, it netted ₹13 crore from 300 screens in two weeks.

=== Critical response ===
Upon release, the film generally received positive reviews, with most critics calling the film "summer entertainer" and lauding its technical aspects. Sify described the film as a "road movie laced with mass elements and extraordinary songs", adding that it is a "jolly good ride". The reviewer praised the "loveable lead pair" for their "credible performance, which makes up for the plot holes". He said that technically the film was N. Lingusamy's best, with R. Madhi's "eye-catching camera work", Antony's "crisp editing", Rajeevan's "exotic set designs", and praised composer Yuvan Shankar Raja, whose "foot-tapping" songs "scorch just like the desert sun" and were all "rocking", while his background score was a "perfect co-ordination with the narration". A reviewer from The Times of India, Bhama Devi Ravi, gave the film 3 out of 5 stars, writing that "the story is not earth-shatteringly new, but what pulls you into the movie is the different spin that Lingusamy gives to the familiar story". She praised the lead pair's performance, particularly Karthi, who "comes up with an enjoyable performance", as well as the film's technical values, describing the camera work as "mind-blowing", Brinda Sarathy's dialogues as "thoroughly enjoyable" and Yuvan Shankar Raja's songs as "a real treat". Indiaglitz described the film as a "racy action-adventure" and "undeniably an entertainer this summer", writing that Lingusamy has brought out "a classy entertainer" and Karthi and Tamannaah's performances are "absolutely great". Regarding the technical crew, the reviewer cited that the camera work was "immaculate", while editor Anthony and stunt coordinator Kanal Kannan had done "an incredible and marvellous job". The music, in particular, was described as "the greatest strength of the movie" and his background score as "excellent".

Behindwoods gave the film 2.5 out of 5 stars, describing the film as "a stylish, light-hearted family entertainer for the summer" and a "Pacy road show with a few humps on a straight run". It too, like the other reviewers, cited that Karthi had brought out an "enjoyable performance", whilst describing Yuvan Shankar Raja as "the major backbone of Paiya". Moreover, he cited that Brinda Sarathy's dialogues "evoke laughter", the car chasing sequence is "absolutely brilliant", the cinematographer "needs plaudits" and the "crisp editing" by Anthony as a "major plus point." In contrast, Rediff's Pavithra Srinivasan cited that there was "[n]othing entertaining about Paiyya" and that film was worth a watch only for Karthi's screen presence, "pretty" Tamannaah and Yuvan's songs, despite giving 2.5 out of 5 stars. She criticised Lingusamy's script as the film's "biggest minus", adding that the film "starts out so very promisingly", describing the first half was "racy, peppy and enthusiastic, only to fizzle out with no appreciable sequences in the second half."

== Accolades ==
Award	Category	Name	Outcome	Ref.
2011 Big Tamil Entertainment Awards	Best Music Director	Yuvan Shankar Raja	Won	
2011 Big Tamil Entertainment Awards	Best Lyricist	Na. Muthukumar	Won	
2011 Vijay Music Awards	Best Music Director (Jury)	Yuvan Shankar Raja	Nominated	
2011 Vijay Music Awards	Best Male Singer (Jury)	Haricharan for "Thuli Thuli"	Nominated	
2011 Vijay Music Awards	Popular Album of the Year 2010	Paiyaa	Nominated	
2011 Vijay Music Awards	Popular Song of the Year 2010	"Thuli Thuli"	Nominated	
2011 Vijay Music Awards	Popular Song of the Year 2010	"En Kadhal Solla"	Nominated	
2011 Vijay Music Awards	Popular Melody of the Year 2010	"Thuli Thuli"	Nominated	
2011 Vijay Music Awards	Popular Duet of the Year 2010	Rahul Nambiar, Saindhavi for "Adada Mazhaida"	Nominated	
2011 Vijay Music Awards	Popular Song Sung by a Music Director	Yuvan Shankar Raja for "En Kadhal Solla"	Won	
2011 Vijay Music Awards	Popular Male Singer of the Year 2010	Rahul Nambiar for "Adada Mazhaida"	Nominated	
2011 Vijay Music Awards	Popular Male Singer of the Year 2010	Haricharan for "Thuli Thuli"	Nominated	
2011 Vijay Music Awards	Popular Female Singer of the Year 2010	Saindhavi for "Adada Mazhaida"	Nominated	
2011 Vijay Music Awards	Mirchi Listener's Choice of the Year 2010	Yuvan Shankar Raja, Haricharan for "Thuli Thuli"	Won	
58th Filmfare Awards South	Filmfare Award for Best Actor – Tamil	Karthi	Nominated	
58th Filmfare Awards South	Best Actress	Tamannaah Bhatia	Nominated	
58th Filmfare Awards South	Best Music Director	Yuvan Shankar Raja	Nominated	
58th Filmfare Awards South	Best Male Playback	Rahul Nambiar for "Adada Mazhaida"	Nominated	
58th Filmfare Awards South	Best Female Playback	Saindhavi for "Adada Mazhaida"	Nominated	
5th Vijay Awards	Best Music Director	Yuvan Shankar Raja	Nominated	
5th Vijay Awards	Best Male Playback Singer	Haricharan	Nominated	
5th Vijay Awards	Best Stunt Director	Kanal Kannan	Nominated	
5th Vijay Awards	Favourite Director	N. Lingusamy	Nominated	
5th Vijay Awards	Favourite Heroine	Tamannaah Bhatia	Nominated	
5th Vijay Awards	Favourite Song	"En Kadhal Solla" – Yuvan Shankar Raja	Won	
Mirchi Music Awards	Best Album of the Year	Paiyaa	Won	
Mirchi Music Awards	Mirchi Listeners’ Choice – Best Song of the Year	"En Kadhal Solla"	Won	
Mirchi Music Awards	Mirchi Listeners’ Choice – Best Album of the Year	Paiyaa	Won	

== Remakes ==
Paiyaa was remade in Kannada in 2014 as Ajith, with Chiranjeevi Sarja playing the male lead.
