= Uttama Villain release and loss issues =

The 2015 Tamil-language film Uttama Villain directed by Ramesh Aravind and starring Kamal Haasan, faced significant issues during its release. The film faced numerous postponements, due to post-production delays and the financial constraints surrounding the production company Thirrupathi Brothers. On the day of its scheduled release on 1 May 2015, the film was not released in theatres due to the disputes between the producers and financiers. With the intervention of the Nadigar Sangam and Tamil Film Producers Council, as well as Haasan's assurance to settle the financiers, the film opened with noon shows on 2 May 2015, a day after the original release.

The film's delayed release resulted in a loss of around ₹10 crore (equivalent to ₹15 crore or US$1.6 million in 2023) business on the opening day. Furthermore, it underperformed at the box-office causing significant financial problems to the company; this resulted in their subsequent productions, excluding Rajinimurugan, either remained unreleased or its production being halted. In 2024, Lingusamy asserted that the film was responsible for the company's decline and accused Kamal for not compensating the losses.

== Overview ==
Uttama Villain was presented by N. Lingusamy under Thirrupathi Brothers who co-produced it with Haasan's Raaj Kamal Films International on a first-copy basis. The film began production in March 2014, with principal photography being commenced on the same month and continued till August. It was originally scheduled to be released in the last quarter of 2014, but due to incomplete post-production works, the film was delayed continuously until it was planned for a theatrical release in the summer of 2015. The film also faced protests from Vishva Hindu Parishad (VHP) and Indian National League, on the accounts of hurting religious sentiments.

=== Financial constraints ===
When the film was under production, Thirrupathi Brothers suffered losses due to the failure of Suriya-starrer Anjaan, which was produced by the company and also directed by Lingusamy. This prompted the producers to sell the distribution rights to Eros International for acquiring funding and further borrowed money from local financiers, ensuring them for distributing the film. A week prior to the film's release, R. Thangaraj of Thangam Cinemas filed a lawsuit against Lingusamy for non-payment of ₹2 crore (equivalent to ₹3.2 crore or US$330,000 in 2023). Despite assurance that the pending dues would be cleared before release, it was later reported that the film had nearly a debt of ₹20–40 crore (equivalent to ₹30–60 crore or US$3.5–6.9 million in 2023). (Note: While Sreedhar Pillai reported that the film had dues of around ₹20 crore (equivalent to ₹30 crore or US$3.1 million in 2023), the film's Andhra Pradesh and Telangana distributor C. Kalyan reported the debt amount to be ₹40 crore (equivalent to ₹60 crore or US$6.3 million in 2023).) Eros International refuted to waive a part of the loan as the amount was too high and the company also faced losses while distributing Lingaa and Kochadaiiyaan.

== Stalling of the release ==
On 1 May 2015, when the film was finally scheduled for release in India, the early morning and afternoon shows were cancelled due to the disputes between producers and financiers. Supposedly, the financiers held back the digital projection keys (Note: The digital file which the films were stored and transmitted with the help of a "key delivery message" from the post-production companies) due to the uncertainty regarding the clearance. An executive from Qube Cinemas stated that 184 theatres had inquired for the print in advance and had transmitted to them, but most of them were yet to confirm the film's screenings. Lingusamy with the executives of Eros International, and K. E. Gnanavel Raja of Studio Green and other distributors discussed about amicably solving the financial tussles but nothing was finalised.

Several fans of Haasan expressed disappointment on the film's shows being cancelled, with many refusing to vacate their seats at the theatre auditorium, claiming that they would wait until they release the film. Some hardcore fans protested outside the theatre premises who opined that Haasan's previous film Vishwaroopam also met with the similar fate prior to its release. With Uttama Villain's sudden stalling, many theatres decided to screen Vai Raja Vai, the Aishwarya Dhanush-directorial which released on the same day, and many of the Hassan fans choosing to watch that film as an alternative. Rakesh Gowthaman, who owns Vettri Theatres, claimed that he had cancelled majority of the shows and instead screened Vai Raja Vai and Kanchana 2, due to the uncertainty regarding the film's release.

Unlike in India, the film's overseas theatrical release was not impacted, since Raaj Kamal Films International had its distribution rights outside India, while the domestic rights were with Thirrupathi Brothers. The Tamil Film Producers Council and Nadigar Sangam discussed with Lingusamy and the distributors to sort out the financial issues, while Haasan who attended the film's premiere in Dubai, flew back to Chennai, and intervened with both parties, regarding the same. By the following day (2 May), both parties reached out with an amicable solution and the film eventually opened on the same day with matinee shows across Tamil Nadu.

== Financial performance and impact ==
Sreedhar Pillai, Tamil film trade analyst had admitted that the release issue "has tarnished the image of Kollywood" and compared this incident to Kaavalan (2011), Nimirndhu Nil (2014) and Madha Gaja Raja (2025) whose releases were stalled due to last minute financial constraints. The subsequent delayed release had resulted in a loss of around ₹8–10 crore (equivalent to ₹12–18 crore US$1.4–2.1 million) from domestic market. According to Pillai, the film was bought for ₹55 crore (equivalent to ₹83 crore or US$8.6 million in 2023) on a first copy basis and another ₹5 crore (equivalent to ₹7.5 crore or US$780,000 in 2023) for print and advertising costs, which was "overpriced for a 'class film', as the trade would say, which has limited appeal and will not go down to B and C markets". He further cited O Kadhal Kanmani and Kanchana 2, released two weeks before Uttama Villain and were financially successful, due to its cost-effective production, mainly recovering the budget within opening weekend and fetching additional revenue from non-theatrical deals becoming profitable for all stakeholders and advised Tamil film producers to control costs.

Uttama Villain underperformed at the box office owing to the delayed release and lack of wide audience appeal. According to trade analyst Trinath, the film failed to break even after two weeks of its release, further stating "Big budget star vehicles rely heavily on the collections of the opening weekend. For Uttama Villain, an opening day collection of nearly Rs.10 crore was expected going by the pre-release buzz. But since the release got delayed, the numbers were affected." Its failure further impacted Thirrupathi Brothers to experience significant financial problems. Rajinimurugan, the company's subsequent production, starring Sivakarthikeyan and directed by Ponram, was scheduled for a 2015 release; however, it was subsequently delayed due to the financial problems before Pen India Limited acquiring its distribution rights and ultimately releasing it for 14 January 2016 (Pongal). Despite the film's commercial success, it could not help the company overcome its financial crisis resulting in their subsequent ventures—Idam Porul Yaeval, Naan Thaan Siva and Ra Ra Rajasekhar—becoming unreleased or ultimately halted. After sorting out the financial and legal issues, the company then returned to film industry by distributing lower-budget films Beginning (2023), Rail and Thiru.Manickam (both 2024).

== Accusations towards Kamal Haasan ==
Lingusamy asserted on the film's failure being responsible for the company's financial problems at multiple instances. In April 2024, in an interaction with Chitra Lakshmanan, Lingusamy while reiterating the film's failure impacting the company, further accused Haasan claiming that he made significant changes to the script. He pointed that he wanted to make a film on the lines of Apoorva Sagodharargal (1989) and Thevar Magan (1992) and Haasan had narrated the story based on it, which had Siddharth playing a parallel lead role. However, the several developments in the script found it difficult for Lingusamy to produce the venture. Stating that while making Uttama Villain, Lingusamy provided several corrections but Haasan never incorporated it despite agreeing to. Lingusamy further added that the production house had acquired the remake rights of Drishyam (2013) and was keen on remaking it with Haasan, who initially refused and later did the film with another producer.

After the film's release and underperformance, Haasan assured Lingusamy to do another film under ₹30 crore (equivalent to ₹45 crore or US$4.7 million in 2023) budget to compensate the losses faced by the company, but the film was never materialised. In May 2024, Lingusamy's brother Subash Chandra Bose filed a case against Haasan at the Tamil Film Producers Council regarding this incident and further pledged the association to negotiate with Haasan and amicably solve the issue.

P. L. Thenappan, who shared a working relationship with Haasan as a producer and co-producer in several of his films, clarified on the dispute between Haasan and the makers. Thenappan, who was a former secretary of the TFPC, during Uttama Villain's release claimed that Haasan had earlier signed an agreement with Thirrupathi Brothers, which was then transferred to Studio Green as Gnanavel Raja helped the company resolve the financial issues. He further added that Haasan had allocated dates from October–December 2015 but the producers either could not arrange funds or they did finalise a story until then, causing delays claiming that the issue was solved back then.

== See also ==
- Lingaa loss issues – controversy revolving over the financial performance of the 2014 film
