= Sandakozhi 2 =

2018 action film directed by N. Lingusamy

- Theatrical release poster
- Directed by: N Lingusamy
- Written by: Brindha Sarathi; S. Ramakrishnan (Dialogues)
- Story by: N Lingusamy
- Produced by: Vishal; Dhaval Jayantilal Gada; Akshay Jayantilal Gada
- Starring: Vishal; Keerthy Suresh; Varalaxmi Sarathkumar; Rajkiran
- Cinematography: K. A. Sakthivel
- Edited by: Praveen K. L.
- Music by: Yuvan Shankar Raja
- Production companies: Vishal Film Factory; Pen Studios
- Distributed by: Lyca Productions; Screen Scene
- Release date: 18 October 2018
- Running time: 150 minutes
- Country: India
- Language: Tamil

Sandakozhi 2 (transl. Fighting Rooster 2) is a 2018 Indian Tamil-language action drama film written and directed by N. Linguswamy. A sequel to Sandakozhi, the film stars Vishal in his 25th film, alongside Keerthy Suresh, Varalaxmi Sarathkumar, and Rajkiran. The music was composed by Yuvan Shankar Raja, while cinematography and editing were handled by Shakthi and Praveen K. L.

Sandakozhi began production during September 2017 and was released on 18 October 2018 to mixed reviews from critics.

== Plot ==
After the events following the first film, (Note: As depicted in Sandakozhi.) Balu returns to Theni district after 7 years from USA to meet his family, where he learns about his distant relative Pechankarasi "Pechi". Pechi's husband was killed by the villagers for killing a lower-caste person. Due to this, Pechi kills all the male clan of the lower-caste person, except for Anbu, who is safeguarded by Balu's chieftain father Durai. Balu learns that Pechi wants to disrupt the temple festival to kill Anbu, where he decide to protect him. During the temple festival, Balu secretly saves Anbu and thrashes the attackers without anyone's knowledge.

Balu meets Sembaruthi, whose activities reminds him of Hema. Sembaruthi learns from Durai that Balu relocated to US as Hema died in an accident on their way to Tirupathi for their marriage. Despite this, Balu falls for Sembaruthi, where Durai accepts their relationship. As per Durai's wishes, Anbu's UPSC attempt at becoming IAS becomes successful, where Durai and Anbu leave for Anbu's village to convey the result. Pechi's men attacks Anbu, but Durai accidentally gets stabbed. Balu rushes and saves Durai, who receives clandestine treatment in his home.

Durai requests Balu to not inform the incident to the villagers, as it would result in communal riots and would eventually spoil the temple festival. Balu promises the comatose Durai that he would save Anbu as well as ensure that the temple festival ends smoothly. Finally, Pechi and Balu meet in an open ground, where Pechi beats up Balu. Balu does not want to hurt Pechi and asks her to leave Anbu, for which she does not agree. When Pechi was about to kill Anbu with a sickle, her chain gets stuck in a Trishula, and she accidentally loses control. Her aruval moves towards her son's neck, but Balu holds the aruval and saves him. Pechi realizes her mistake and decides to spare Anbu. Durai recovers and reunites with Balu and Sembaruthi.

== Cast ==
- Vishal as Balu
- Keerthy Suresh as Sembaruthi
- Varalaxmi Sarathkumar as Pechankarasi (Pechi)
- Rajkiran as Durai Pandi Thevar
- Hari Krishnan as Anbu
- Ramdoss as Murugan
- Ganja Karuppu as Durai's servant
- Munishkanth as Durai's driver
- Thennavan as Durai's brother-in-law
- Shanmugarajan as Durai's brother-in-law
- Hareesh Peradi as Karumayi
- Ashwanth Ashokkumar as Sembaruthi's brother
- G. Gnanasambandam as Sembaruthi's father
- Piraisoodan as a villager
- K. S. G. Venkatesh as a villager
- G. Marimuthu as a villager
- Joe Malloori as a villager
- Mu. Ramaswamy as a villager
- Raghu Babu as a villager
- T. Ravi as a villager
- Gajaraj as a villager
- Mayilsamy as drunkard
- Rajendran as local rowdy
- Arjai as Pechi's brother-in-law
- Appani Sarath as Pechi's brother-in-law
- Murali Shankar as Hari Krishnan elder brother
- Krishna as Pechi's brother-in-law
- Kabali Vishwanth as Pechi's husband
- Nandha Periyasamy as collector
- Saravana Sakthi as groom
- Stills Vijay
- Ravi Gunna
- Shanthi Mani
- TSR Srinivasan as a priest
- Lal in a special appearance as Kasi (Koti)
- Jhony in a special appearance
- Nobel Paul in a special appearance
- Bhoopathy in a special appearance

== Production ==
Following the release of Anjaan in August 2014, Linguswamy took a brief sabbatical before simultaneously completing two scripts, Yenni Ezhu Naal for actor Karthi and a sequel to his successful Sandakozhi (2005) for Vishal. In December 2014, it was announced that the sequel would be jointly produced by Vishal's Vishal Film Factory and Linguswamy's Thirrupathi Brothers and that production would start in 2015. Thirrupathi Brothers later opted out of production duties after the failure of several of their films (Including Anjaan) meant that they experienced financial constraints. The casting process began in mid-2015, with Rajkiran retained to reprise his role from the original film alongside Vishal, while Soori was signed for a new role and D. Imman was selected as the music composer. Meera Jasmine, who played the leading female role in the 2005 film, was reported to be portraying a cameo role, while the team looked for another actress to play a leading role. Shamili and Akshara Haasan were approached and held discussions for the role in mid-2015, but neither actress was eventually signed on. Sathyaraj was also considered for the role of the lead antagonist, but production delays meant that the actor was not finalised. Despite announcements that the film would begin shoot in August 2015, it failed to take off and Vishal stated in an interview to The Hindu that the film would not happen unless the script was better than the first.

In January 2016, Vishal revealed that production would start in February and that the film would have the city of Madurai as its backdrop. However, during late February 2016, Vishal revealed that the film had been cancelled and blamed Linguswamy's lack of commitment towards the project. The move had come after Linguswamy had agreed terms to work on a bilingual film starring Allu Arjun for Studio Green, without sorting out dates with Vishal. In a turn of events in June 2016, Vishal stated that the film had been revived and that cinematographer Madhi and composer Yuvan Shankar Raja (who composed for the prequel) had also joined the project, replacing Imman. In due course, Linguswamy delayed his project with Allu Arjun and resumed scripting for Sandakozhi 2. The team held discussions with more actresses about the lead role, first approaching Manjima Mohan, before Keerthy Suresh was finalised in December 2016. The shoot was meant to start in January 2017 but was delayed further when Vishal chose to prioritise his commitments to filming for Mysskin's Thupparivaalan (2017). Hareesh Peradi and Varalaxmi Sarathkumar were recruited in mid-2017 to portray negative roles, with the latter appearing as the wife of one of three antagonists in the script.

The film was launched with a ceremony in Chennai on 10 August 2017, with the art directors led by Rajeevan, constructing a set resembling a festival at Binny Mills, Chennai. Due to Madhi was busy with other commitments, cinematographer K.A. Shakthivel was roped in. The set at Binny Mills was made to resemble one of Madurai's key localities with 500 shops and a temple being erected and initial scenes for a song were shot with junior artistes. Despite indications that the lead actors would join by late August, the film's first filming schedule only began on 20 September 2017 at Binny Mills.

== Release ==
The film was simultaneously dubbed and released in Telugu under the title. Pandem Kodi 2. The satellite rights of the film were sold to Sun TV.

== Music ==
Sandakozhi 2

Soundtrack album by Yuvan Shankar Raja
- Released: Sep 24, 2018
- Recorded: 2018
- Genre: Soundtrack
- Length: 20:16
- Language: Tamil
- Label: Sony Music India
- Producer: Yuvan Shankar Raja

Yuvan Shankar Raja chronology
Genius (2018)	Sandakozhi 2 (2018)	Maari 2 (2018)

The soundtrack was composed by Yuvan Shankar Raja and released by Sony Music India.

Track list
No.	Title	Lyrics	Singer(s)	Length
1.	"Kambathu Ponnu"	Yegathasi	Yuvan Shankar Raja	3:35
2.	"Meesa Vecha Vetaikaaran"	Arun Bharathi	Mahalingam	4:44
3.	"Alalaa"	Madhan Karky	Kailash Kher	3:48
4.	"Sooriyarum Sooriyanum"	Brinda Sarathy	Yuvan Shankar Raja	2:38
5.	"Sengarattan Paaraiyula"	Arivumathi	Rockstar Ramani Ammal, Senthildass Velayutham	3:25
6.	"Folk Instrumental" (Instrumental)			2:06
Total length:				20:16

== Reception ==
The film received mixed reviews from critics. On the review aggregator website Rotten Tomatoes, 20% of 5 critics' reviews are positive, with an average rating of 4.2/10.

A reviewer at Sify.com described the second half of the film as too dramatic, with a disappointing climax, but praised the film for having a strong father-son story, and for Keerthy Suresh's "bubbly" performance. Film Companion South wrote"All Lingusamy does is transform the broad beats of a classic drama like Thevar Magan into a masala entertainer ". Mirchi9 reviewing the Telugu dubbed version Pandem Kodi 2, rated 2 out of 5 and wrote "Not Even Half The Fun".

== Awards and nominations ==
Date of ceremony	Award	Category	Recipient(s) and nominee(s)	Result	Ref.
16 December 2018	Behindwoods Gold Medal	Best Actor in Negative role - Female	Varalaxmi Sarathkumar	Won	
5 January 2019	Ananda Vikatan Cinema Awards	Best Villain - Female	Varalaxmi Sarathkumar	Won	
