= Uttama Villain =

2015 Indian film by Ramesh Aravind

- Theatrical release poster
- Directed by: Ramesh Aravind
- Written by: Kamal Haasan
- Produced by: Kamal Haasan; N. Lingusamy; Chandrahasan; N. Subash Chandrabose
- Starring: Kamal Haasan
- Cinematography: Shamdat Sainudeen
- Edited by: Vijay Shankar
- Music by: Ghibran
- Production companies: Raaj Kamal Films International; Thirrupathi Brothers
- Distributed by: Eros International (Worldwide); Studio Green (Tamil Nadu); Lotus Five Star (Malaysia)
- Release date: 2 May 2015
- Running time: 171 minutes
- Country: India
- Language: Tamil
- Box office: est. ₹101 crore

Uttama Villain (transl. The Righteous Villain) is a 2015 Indian Tamil-language comedy drama film directed by Ramesh Aravind and written by Kamal Haasan, who co-produced the film with Chandrahasan under Raaj Kamal Films International and N. Lingusamy and N. Subash Chandrabose under Thirrupathi Brothers. The film features an ensemble cast that includes Hassan, K. Viswanath, K. Balachander (in his posthumous film), Jayaram, Andrea Jeremiah, Pooja Kumar, Nassar, Parvathy Thiruvothu and Urvashi in prominent roles. In the film, a leading superstar, who is affected by a brain tumour and having a short time to live, approaches his mentor to direct his final film—a folklore-ish comedy about a man who keeps cheating death and his role in saving a kingdom—while also trying to sort out his personal relationship with his estranged son and illegitimate daughter.

The film was officially announced in March 2014 with principal photography being commenced the same month and concluded by that August; filming took place in Chennai, Bengaluru, Madhya Pradesh, with a song sequence in Istanbul. The film's music is composed by Ghibran, with cinematography handled by Shamdat Sainudeen and editing done by Vijay Shankar.

Uttama Villain was scheduled to release on 1 May 2015 but was put on hold due to the disputes between the producers and financiers and released a day later after the issues were sorted out. It received positive reviews from critics and several awards from international film festivals, mainly for its music and other aspects. However, the film became a box office bomb, which severely impacted Thirrupathi Brothers resulting in their ultimate halting of film production.

== Plot ==
Manoranjan is a leading film star who is immensely popular among his fans but is beset with several personal problems. Twenty-five years ago, he had been forced to marry Varalakshmi, the daughter of noted film director Poornachandra Rao, despite being in a relationship with a woman named Yamini (not shown on-screen). His relationship with his son with Varalakshmi, Manohar, is troubled. Besides, he comes to realise that he has a daughter Manonmani, who was born out of wedlock, during his relationship with Yamini, and was raised by Yamini's husband Jacob Zachariah, after Yamini's death. Furthermore, he is recently diagnosed with advanced stage brain cancer and has only a few more months to live, a fact which is unknown to his own family. He is treated by his family doctor Dr. Arpana, with whom he has an extramarital affair.

After these revelations come to him in a flood, Manoranjan decides to withdraw from a film produced by Poornachandra Rao and instead act in a film produced by himself and directed by Margadarsi, who was his mentor. The two directors had fallen out when Manoranjan married Varalakshmi and started acting in films directed and produced by Poornachandra Rao, who is Margadarsi's rival. Despite the personal differences between the directors, Manoranjan wishes for Margadarsi to be the director of his last film before he dies. Margadarsi initially refuses to direct Manoranjan, but when he hears from Arpana about Manoranjan's terminal illness, he is visibly moved and accepts to direct Manoranjan. When Poornachandra Rao and Varalakshmi find out about Manoranjan's plan, they become enraged and leave his house along with Manohar. Undaunted, Manoranjan proceeds with his film.

Manoranjan's film with Margadarsi is titled Uttama Villain. It is a fantasy comedy film which tells the story of a street artist named Uttaman, who has dodged death several times and is hence believed to be immortal. With the help of a princess named Karpagavalli, he works to defeat the evil king Muttharasan, who is obsessed about gaining Karpagavalli and the whole Theeyam empire. During the shooting of the film, Manoranjan's condition worsens, and he is hospitalised several times. Margadarsi convinces Manoranjan to inform his family about his condition. This leads to his rapprochement with Poornachandra Rao (and also between Margadarsi and Poornachandra Rao) and the growth of a bond with his son Manohar. Varalakshmi, on the other hand, suffers a heart attack on hearing the news, though she soon recovers. She apologises to Manoranjan for her actions to forcibly separate him from Yamini, so that she could marry him. Later, Manoranjan finds out that a letter he had written to Yamini shortly after they had separated, had not been delivered to her. When Manonmani reads this letter, which tells about Manoranjan's support for Yamini's decision to not undergo an abortion despite being pregnant out of wedlock, her hatred towards her biological father turns to love and she finally accepts him as her father.

After completing the shooting of Uttama Villain, Manoranjan becomes very sick, suffering from delirium as well as slurred speech and movement, and faints. He is immediately rushed to the hospital. Margadarsi completes editing the film and plays it in the hospital. The people present in the hospital, including all the loved ones of Manoranjan, enjoy the film, which ends with Uttaman killing Muttharasan in a stage drama (Iraniya Naadagam), thus dodging death yet again. However, in real life, Arpana informs Manohar and Manonmani that Manoranjan had died.

The film ends with a screening of Uttama Villain in a theatre, which is enjoyed by the audience and becomes a hit.

== Cast ==
- Kamal Haasan as Manoranjan, a popular actor in Tamil Nadu (plays Uthaman)
- K. Balachander as Margadarisi, reputed film director and Manoranjan's guru
- K. Viswanath as Poornachandra Rao, Manoranjan's father-in-law
- Jayaram as Jacob Zachariah, Yamini's husband and Manonmani's father
- M. S. Bhaskar as Chokkalingam Chettiar (Chokku), Manoranjan's personal assistant
- Urvashi as Varalakshmi
- Andrea Jeremiah as Dr Arpana
- Pooja Kumar as Parveen (plays Karpagavalli) (Voice dubbed by Abhirami)
- Parvathy Thiruvothu in a dual role as
  - Manonmani, Manoranjan and Yamini's daughter
  - Yamini (seen in photos)
- Nassar as Nassar, an actor (plays Muttharasan)
- Shanmugarajan as Shanmugarajan (plays Sudalaimuthu)
- G. Gnanasambandam as Kaakapusundar
- Vaiyapuri as Snake charmer
- Chitra Lakshmanan as PRO Lakshmanan
- Ajay Rathnam as King Sadayavarman
- Dheepa Ramanujam as Queen
- Ashwin Arvind as Manohar, Manoranjan's son
- Parvathy Nair as Indira
- Ajay Raj as Parthi
- Bhargavi Narayan as Dhanalakshmi
- Prakash Belawadi as Dr. D. S. (Neurosurgeon) (cameo appearance)
- Anushree as Anchor

Ghibran, Subbu Arumugam, Shamdat and Vijai Shankar make cameo appearances as themselves, working as technicians on the film in the film. Rajesh M. Selva, the first assistant director, appears as a spy in the film.

== Production ==
=== Development ===
In April 2013, director-producer N. Lingusamy made an official statement confirming that Kamal Haasan had agreed to direct and feature in a film to be produced by the production house, Thirrupathi Brothers. The actor had handed Lingusamy three scripts with the pair choosing the most commercially viable option, with the early working title of the film being Bitter Chocolate. In June 2013, the project was retitled Uttama Villain, with Kamal Haasan himself writing the script for the film, while Crazy Mohan was involved in early discussions for the film's dialogues. Eventually, Kamal Haasan wanted to do Uttama Villain as a full-fledged comedy film after the production of Vishwaroopam (2013), due to Haasan's commitments of acting in comedy films soon after he finishes an experimental film, with the controversies he faced during the release of Vishwaroopam being added as one of the factors.

In July 2013, Ramesh Aravind took over the task of directing the film from Haasan, for whom the film became his directorial debut in Tamil, after previously directed films in Kannada. However, it was not being the first film; his proposed directorial debut was titled KG (2004) with Haasan which was shelved after Haasan's commitments with Mumbai Xpress (2005). In February 2014, Ghibran was announced as the film's music director, replacing the initially announced composer Yuvan Shankar Raja. Sanu John Varghese and Mahesh Narayanan were initially reported to be the film's cinematographer and editor respectively after working with Haasan in Vishwaroopam. However, Haasan chose Shamdat Sainudeen and Vijay Shankar as the director of photography and editor of the project respectively. Gautami was selected to design the costumes. According to Aravind, Haasan wrote the majority of the dialogue and that Mohan's input and suggestions were recorded.

=== Casting ===
Kamal Haasan was reported to play two roles for the film: one being a 21st-century cinema superstar named Manoranjan and an 8th-century drama actor named Uthaman. Kajal Aggarwal was initially reported to have signed on to play the lead female role, though her manager later confirmed that she was not approached and that her dates were already allotted for other projects. Similarly, Santhanam was also reported to play comedian in the film but the actor denied such claims. Asin and Deepika Padukone were also reported by the media to be cast in the lead female role, though neither reports materialised. The team later held discussions with actresses Divya Spandana and Lekha Washington for roles in the film, though neither were signed. A month prior to shoot, three female lead characters were touted to appear in the film, with the names of Kajal Aggarwal (who initially refused the film), Tamannaah and Trisha Krishnan were surfaced.

In a turn of events, the team chose Pooja Kumar and Andrea Jeremiah as the female leads, whom earlier worked with Haasan in Vishwaroopam, and Parvathy Thiruvothu was also offered for the third female lead role. Pooja played the role of a non-Tamil-speaking modern-day actress, who was offered a character that spoke classical Tamil. Pooja also performed three song sequences in the film, unlike in Vishwaroopam (2013), where she had only one song sequence. Kamal Haasan's daughter Shruti Haasan was considered for the role of his on-screen daughter in the film but her unavailability meant that the team chose to pick a new actress instead. Another actress Parvathy Nair was added to the cast after impressing the team in an audition and was select to be paired opposite Ashwin, a debutant who plays Kamal Haasan's son in the film. Sarath Kumar and Vivek were reported to have been added to the preliminary cast, but the actors later noted the news as untrue.

In January 2014, noted director K. Balachander was selected to play a pivotal role in the film and sported a beard for his character. He was reported to play Manoranjan's mentor Margadarshi, who guided him to this status of superstardom, ironically Balachander was also Haasan's real-life mentor. Producer Lingusamy himself was reported to be playing a role in the venture, after being seen sporting a new look during the making of his directorial project Anjaan (2014). Director K. Viswanath also joined the film's cast as did Jayaram, and the pair began filming scenes in March 2014. Anant Mahadevan, who featured in Vishwaroopam (2013), was given the role of the manager of Kamal Haasan's character in the film. More details about the film were shown in mid-March with a detailed cast and character list released to the media. In May 2014, actor Nassar was signed for a supporting role. In July 2014, director Chitra Lakshmanan joined the team to play a small role in the film. Abhirami was selected to dub for Pooja Kumar in the film. Ramesh Aravind himself was to make a cameo appearance in the film, but the director denied such claims. Following the death of K. Balachander, the team released the film as a homage to the late director.

=== Filming ===
In mid-February 2014, the team carried out make up tests involving Kamal Haasan in Bangalore with a photo shoot being held with the actor. Principal photography began on 3 March 2014. The team then shot for two weeks in Bangalore, before moving on to film few sequences in Chennai. During this schedule, the team shot the film in a plethora of locations included five star hotels, studios and big houses. Vishwanath, Balachander and Andrea were also present during filming. In early April, parts of the film were shot in Madhya Pradesh before the team returned to Bangalore to film scenes involving Parvathy Nair and Ashwin. Further scenes involving Kamal Haasan in the role of a star actor were filmed at a shopping mall in Bangalore, with several hundred onlookers used as extras. Posters from a fictional film in the plot, Veera Vilaiyattu, were put up around the mall by the film's art direction team.

After initially planning a trip to Australia to film the songs from the soundtrack for a week, the team later opted to fly to Turkey instead. Many scenes in the film, including a song featuring Kamal Haasan and Pooja Kumar was consequently shot in Istanbul. The cast performed night rehearsals to perfect their expressions and dialogues. The portions featuring Kamal Haasan as an ageing superstar were completed with the shoot of the song, followed by the 21st century portions which were completed by mid-May 2014. In between, Kamal Haasan took a break from the shoot to attend the 2014 Cannes Film Festival and to inaugurate the Indian Pavilion there. Another schedule was started on 21 May 2014 in Madhya Pradesh and then at a private studio in Chennai, with the team filming scenes that take place in the 8th century. Actor Nasser joined the film playing the antagonist and also has a dual role in the film. In early June 2014, Andrea had completed her portions in the film.

Kamal Haasan sustained a small muscle pull during the film's shooting and was advised a day's rest. However, he attended an award ceremony following his commitments to be a part of it and the makers released the teaser of the film on the same event. The majority of the film's portions were shot by the end of July, with only patchwork and dubbing left. A 10-minute climax sequence of the film was shot during the schedule which was touted to be a "spellbinding experience for moviegoers". On 9 August 2014, Ramesh Aravind confirmed on his Twitter account that the shooting of the film had been completed at the Chennai Film Institute with a song sequence which would feature in the 8th century segment of the film.

== Music ==
The soundtrack and film score was composed by Ghibran in his maiden collaboration with Kamal Haasan. Ghibran signed the project along with Haasan's Vishwaroopam II (2018), but as the film's production was delayed, he has signed for the actor's other two projects: Papanasam and Thoongaa Vanam (both 2015). The film's soundtrack emphasises use of traditional tunes fused with symphony orchestra, with instruments bought from Bali, Indonesia for creating an Indian and exotic soundscape. The soundtrack featured 17 songs with lyrics written by Haasan, Viveka and Subbu Arumugam, and was launched on 1 March 2015 at the Chennai Trade Centre. The music was acclaimed by critics upon release.

== Marketing ==
Prior to the film's production, the first look teaser and the title logo design of the film was released on 1 March 2014; the first poster depicted a Theyyam art form sketched on Haasan's face and few more posters were subsequently released. Upon release, it was speculated that the poster was inspired from a photograph taken by French photographer Eric Lafforgue, but Hassan denied the allegations by saying, "Theyyam is more than a 1000-year-old art. The make-up was done by a good artist who is probably a third-generation practitioner of this art. My film has a Theyyam dance fusion with Tamil Nadu's Kooththu tradition." Admitting that the lighting might have had a few similarities to the photograph of the French photographer, he said that comparing the photo with his first look poster was like saying two lovers leaning on one another's chest looking in the same direction is a copy of the Ek Duje Ke Liye poster. Haasan further stated that the poster did not depict a mask, but make-up painted on his face and that it took four hours to paint it.

Thirrupathi Brothers launched the teaser trailer for this film and the Suriya-starrer Anjaan (another film produced by the studio), at the 8th Vijay Awards held on 5 July 2014 and was simultaneously uploaded to YouTube. The film's trailer was supposed to be released on Pongal, but after being unofficially leaked through the internet on 13 January 2015, the trailer was launched the next day morning by the makers. The second trailer of the film was released at the film's music launch event on 1 March, and the third trailer was unveiled on 27 April. Shortly after the film's release, the makers unveiled six deleted scenes of the film, which was well received.

== Release ==
=== Theatrical ===
Kamal Haasan revealed that the film would release before Vishwaroopam II, another film which featured him in the lead role. Uttama Villain was earlier reported to be releasing on 2 October 2014, coinciding with Gandhi Jayanthi, along with Hrithik Roshan-starrer Bang Bang! and Sivakarthikeyan's Kaaki Sattai. However, Ramesh Aravind refuted those claims, citing that the film involved extensive visual effects work to be done and that it would be completed in ten weeks, resulting in the possibilities of the film not being released on the date. Then the release of 7 November 2014, which coincided Haasan's birthday also proved to be untrue, with the film being postponed to early 2015. The film was then speculated to release on 20 February 2015, following information from a popular ticket booking website. In January, it was reported that the film's release was later pushed to April 2015.

In February 2015, Eros International which purchased the worldwide distribution rights of the film announced that the film will be released worldwide on 2 April 2015. Thirrupathi Brothers acquired the domestic theatrical rights while Raajkamal Films International handled the distribution for the overseas theatres. Studio Green bought the Tamil Nadu theatrical rights, while C. Kalyan acquired the film's theatrical rights in Andhra Pradesh and Telangana. The release was later pushed to 10 April 2015, coinciding with the five-day Tamil New Year weekend; and trade analysts believed about the increase in footfalls, following school examinations which will be completed within the same date. However, due to the delay in completion of visual effects, the producers later postponed the film to 24 April and later to 1 May, which was confirmed by the producers. The team attended the film's premiere at the Golden Cinemas in Dubai on 30 April 2015, a day before the Indian release.

=== Home media ===
Herotalkies.com (VS Ecommerce Ventures) legally released the film for audiences outside India in June 2015. Initially, the satellite rights were acquired by Jaya TV, but it was later sold to Zee Tamil.

== Controversies ==
Prior to its release, the Vishva Hindu Parishad's (VHP) Tamil Nadu wing called for banning the film's release, as they alleged that the lyrics of a song in the film had belittled a conversation between Prahalada and Hiranyakashipu, which offend the religious sentiments of Hindu people. They also criticised the makers for the objectionable portrayal of Lord Vishnu in a song. The Indian National League, a Muslim organisation also volunteered on protesting against the film citing that it may hurt religious sentiments. Furthermore, a lawsuit was filed by producer and distributor R. Thangaraj of Thangam Cinemas, to stay the release of the film citing Lingusamy's non-payment of ₹2 crore (equivalent to ₹3.0 crore or US$310,000 in 2023) dues to the distributor. Lingusamy later assured the distributor that the amount would be settled before 28 April.

On the day of the scheduled release (1 May 2015), the film's morning and afternoon shows all over India were cancelled owing to financial disputes between Thirrupathi Brothers and Eros International over non-payment of dues; the former was in deficit of ₹20 crore (equivalent to ₹30 crore or US$3.1 million in 2023) before the film's release. Haasan returned to Chennai from Dubai, to sort out the issue between the producers and financiers. With the intervention of the Tamil Film Producers Council and Nadigar Sangam, along with Haasan's assurance to settle the remaining dues, the film opened to theatres with matinee shows on 2 May 2015. Unlike the film's release, which was delayed in India, the release outside India was not impacted as Raajkamal Films International had the overseas rights.

== Reception ==
=== Critical response ===
M. Suganth, editor-in-chief of The Times of India rated the film three-and-a-half out of five, lauding it as one of the "rare films with a meta-narrative where the line between the real and the reel becomes hard to distinguish and further called it as glorious showcase for Kamal the writer as he superbly blends subtlety with slapstick and the emotional moments never descend into full-blown melodrama that turns all eyes misty throughout the film". Siddharth K of Sify gave Uttama Villain four out of five stars and called it "a courageous film which breaks away from being a routine fare", describing it as "emotional as well as gripping". He also felt that "The sheer thrill of watching a film and not knowing what will happen next is one of the great pleasures offered by director Ramesh Aravind", summing it up as "a good example of an entertaining commercial film that didn't need to be lazy or senseless". Karthik Keramalu of IBN Live appreciated Uttama Villain majorly for three particular conversations that they placed among the best in Tamil cinema, concluding that it is "a film worthy of a eulogy speech and the grandeur is not spoilt in the name of commercialization".

S. Saraswathi of Rediff.com appreciated director Ramesh Aravind for the narrative "that skilfully alternates between fake and real which is seemingly similar situations is ingenious" and lauded the brilliance of Kamal Haasan, "the master performer for essaying two totally contrasting characters amazingly". She wrote that the film may not appeal to all due to its almost three hours length and slow screenplay, but still judged that it is "a film worth watching for stunning music and performance" and rating it three out of five. Saibal Chatterjee of NDTV lauded Uttama Villain as a "terrific take on superstardom and mortality, feeling it is a satire in parts when Manoranjan, played by Kamal Haasan comes to know that he has only a few days to live, so he decides to make a film in which he's immortal".

Anupama Subramanian of Deccan Chronicle wrote that the movie lived up to expectations partially as the first half drags, but post interval picks up the momentum summing up as a Kamal show all the way, sparkling as an ego bloated Manoranjan and the simpleton Uttaman, concluding, "There are few shortcomings. Nevertheless Kamals' amazing screen presence pulls an otherwise bit dragging film with a runtime of 2 hours and 52 minutes". Baradwaj Rangan in his review for The Hindu wrote, "Kamal Haasan's writing is so dense and allusive and overstuffed and layered and indulgent that it's always a question whether even the best actors and directors in the world can come up with the kind of wit and timing needed to fully make the transition from page to screen — in other words, the best Kamal Haasan movies are probably locked up inside his head, where they reside in the most perfect possible manner. But with some of the lightweight cast and crew, he's been working with of late, this material doesn't stand a chance".

=== Box office ===
Uttama Villain's delayed release impacted the box office performance, according to trade analyst Trinath as the film failed to break-even, two weeks after the film's release. Sreedhar Pillai noted that, with the film not being released on opening day across India, resulted in a loss of around ₹8–10 crore (equivalent to ₹12–18 crore US$1.4–2.1 million). Publications like News18 and Onmanorama considered the film to be a "disaster". However, The Times of India noted that the film grossed around ₹100 crore (equivalent to ₹151 crore or US$16 million in 2023).

Uttama Villain's financial underperformance impacted Thirrupathi Brothers, resulting in their subsequent films being languished in development hell or remained unreleased; with the exception of Rajinimurugan (2015), which was however delayed from a scheduled 2015 release due to the company's financial constraints and released during the eve of Pongal (14 January 2016). In 2024, Lingusamy asserted that the film was responsible for the financial problems faced by the production house and accused Haasan for not compensating the losses. Lingusamy's brother Subash Chandra Bose, filed a case against Haasan at the Tamil Film Producers Council citing that the latter had agreed to do a film to compensate the losses secured by the company, but the film did not materialize and insisted Haasan to compensate the losses.

== Accolades ==
Award (Note: Awards, festivals and organisations are in alphabetical order.)	Date of ceremony (Note: Date is linked to the article about the awards held that year, wherever possible.)	Category	Recipient(s)	Result	Ref.
Behindwoods Gold Medal	25 July 2016	Best Music Director	Ghibran	Won	
Behindwoods Gold Medal	25 July 2016	Best Female Playback Singer	Padmalatha – ("Kaadhalam Kadavul Mun")	Won	
Behindwoods Gold Medal	25 July 2016	Best Choreography	Kamal Haasan, Jayachandra Palazhy	Won	
IIFA Utsavam	24–25 January 2016	Best Performance in a Leading Role – Male	Kamal Haasan	Nominated	
IIFA Utsavam	24–25 January 2016	Best Performance In A Negative Role	Nassar	Nominated	
International Independent Film Awards	29 January 2016	Diamond Award for Best Original Song	"Iraniyan Naadagam"	Won	
International Independent Film Awards	29 January 2016	Diamond Award for Best Original Song	"Kadhalam Kadavul Mun"	Won	
International Independent Film Awards	29 January 2016	Platinum Award for Best Original Score	Ghibran	Won	
Los Angeles Independent Film Festival	14 November 2015	Best Picture	Kamal Haasan, N. Lingusamy (producers)	Won	
Los Angeles Independent Film Festival	14 November 2015	Best Produced Screenplay	Kamal Haasan	Won	
Los Angeles Independent Film Festival	14 November 2015	Best Actor	Kamal Haasan	Won	
Los Angeles Independent Film Festival	14 November 2015	Best Original Music/Score	Ghibran	Won	
Los Angeles Independent Film Festival	14 November 2015	Best Original Song	Kamal Haasan (lyricist of the song Iraniyan Naadagam)	Won	
Los Angeles Independent Film Festival	14 November 2015	Best Sound Design	Kunal Rajan	Won	
Los Angeles Independent Film Festival	14 November 2015	Best Foreign Feature	Ramesh Aravind (director)	Nominated	
Prestige Music Award	18 December 2015	World Music Category	"Kaadhalam Kadavul Mun"	Won (Gold Winner)	
Prestige Music Award	18 December 2015	World Music Category	"Iraniyan Naadagam"	Won (Silver Winner)	
Russian International Film Festival	15 November 2015	Best Original Music	Ghibran	Won	
South Indian International Movie Awards	30 June–1 July 2016	Best Actor in a Supporting Role – Tamil	Nassar	Nominated	
South Indian International Movie Awards	30 June–1 July 2016	Best Music Director – Tamil	Ghibran	Nominated	
Tamil Nadu State Film Awards	6 March 2024	Best Music Director	Ghibran (Note: also for Papanasam)	Won	
Tamil Nadu State Film Awards	6 March 2024	Best Stunt Coordinator	T. Ramesh	Won	
