= Brinda Sarathy =

Indian film director

- Born: Subramanian N. 07 June; Kumbakonam, Tamil Nadu, India
- Occupations: Poet, Film director, Screenwriter
- Years active: 2001 – present

Brinda Sarathy is an Indian film director, screenwriter, and poet.

== Life ==
Brindha Sarathy started his film career by working as an associate director and dialogue writer to N. Linguswamy in his debut film Aanandham. However, he didn't work together with Linguswamy again in the latter's subsequent films, but turned an independent director. He went on to remake the Telugu film Manasantha Nuvve (2001) into his directional Tamil debut Thithikudhe (2003). The film starred Jiiva and Sridevi Vijaykumar in the main lead roles, with Shrutika in a main supporting role. It was a moderate success at the Tamil Nadu box office.

He then had planned to shoot his next film after, again featuring Jiiva in the lead, which, however got shelved for unknown reasons and didn't take off again. After a long hiatus, he again joined Linguswamy as a dialogue writer for the romantic-action film Paiyaa in 2010.

He has also published books of poetry.

== Filmography ==
=== As film director ===
Year	Film	Notes			
Year	Film	Notes	2003	Thithikudhe	Remake of Telugu film Manasantha Nuvve

=== As writer ===
Year	Film	Credited as	Notes
Year	Film	Writer	Notes
2001	Aanandham	Dialogues	
2010	Paiyaa	Dialogues	
2012	Vettai	Dialogues	
2014	Anjaan	Dialogues	
2018	Sandakozhi 2	Dialogues	Also lyrics for "Sooriyarum Sooriyanum"
2022	The Warriorr	Tamil dialogues	Also actor

== Books ==
- Sunday School / ஞாயிற்றுக்கிழமை பள்ளிக்கூடம் (Poetry)
- Birds Shadow / பறவையின் நிழல் (Poetry)
- Numbers & Letters / எண்ணும் எழுத்தும் (Poetry)
- Pond where fish sleeps/ மீன்கள் உறங்கும் குளம் (Poetry)
