= Captain Khan (film) =

2018 film by Wajed Ali Sumon

- Theatrical poster
- Directed by: Wajed Ali Sumon
- Written by: N. Lingusamy
- Produced by: Selim Khan
- Starring: Shakib Khan; Shabnom Bubly; Khalid Hossain Samrat; Misha Sawdagor; Ashish Vidyarthi
- Cinematography: Saiful Saheen
- Edited by: Touhid Hossain Chowdhury
- Music by: Shahriar Rafat (songs); Yuvan Shankar Raja (uncredited; score, reused from Anjaan)
- Production company: Shapla Media
- Distributed by: Live Technologies Limited
- Release date: 22 August 2018
- Running time: 155 minutes
- Country: Bangladesh
- Language: Bengali
- Budget: ৳3.5 crore (US$290,000)

Captain Khan is a 2018 Bangladeshi action thriller film directed by Wajed Ali Sumon and written by Delowar Hossain Dil. The film was produced by Selim Khan under the banner of Shapla Media. It features superstar Shakib Khan, Shabnom Bubly, Khalid Hossain Samrat, Misha Sawdagor and Ashish Vidyarthi in the lead roles. It also features Amit Hasan, Sadek Bachchu, Don and Shiba Shanu in supporting roles. It is an unofficial remake of the 2014 Suriya starrer Tamil film Anjaan. The film had a nationwide theatrical release on Eid-ul-Adha 2018.

== Plot ==
A disabled man, Asif (Shakib Khan), arrives in town. He, along with a taxi driver, travel around Dhaka to look for his elder brother, Captain Khan. The taxi driver tries to get to know about Asif but is unable to get any details from him. Asif rents a hotel room, takes a shower, and changes his dress.

Asif starts the mission to find his brother, Captain Khan. He realizes that his brother has been harmed by some dangerous people, who then try to kill Asif, when they understand that he has come for the Captain. Then starts a mystery with much action.

== Cast ==
- Shakib Khan as Captain Khan / Asif
- Shabnom Bubly as Riya
- Khalid Hossain Samrat as Joy, Captain's partner and friend
- Misha Sawdagor as Ibrahim
- Amit Hasan as R.K
- Shiba Shanu as Abbas
- Sadek Bachchu as Jamal Bhai
- Ashish Vidyarthi as Abdur Rahman, police commissioner
- Subrata as Inspector Afzal
- Parthasarathi Chakraborty as Cocktail Khan, a taxi driver
- Don as Tony
- Sumit Ganguly (special appearance)
- DJ Shohel

== Production ==
The film inauguration was held on March 26, 2018 at Bangladesh Film Development Corporation (BFDC). The filming was wrapped up on 30 July 2018 with its climax scene. After that, the film's item song title "Kancha Pirit" was shot at BFDC from July 31. Two of its romantic songs were shot in Bangkok, Thailand, from August 6 to 11, 2018.

== Soundtrack ==
Captain Khan

Soundtrack album by Shahriar Rafat
- Released: 2018
- Studio: Shapla Media
- Genre: Feature film soundtrack
- Length: 16:18
- Language: Bengali
- Label: Live Tech
- Producer: Shahriar Rafat

Shahriar Rafat chronology
Chittagainga Powa Noakhailla Maiya (2018)	Captain Khan (2018)	Poddar Prem (2019)

Singles from Captain Khan
- 1. "Mama Maw Maw" Released: 18 August 2018; 2. "Captain Khan" Released: 21 August 2018; 3. "Emon Kore Keno Takao" Released: 22 August 2018

No.	Title	Lyrics	Music	Singer(s)	Length
1.	"Mama Maw Maw"	Lincon	Lincoln	Nakash Aziz	4:03
2.	"Captain Khan"	Sudip Kumar Dip	Sahriar Rafat	Sahriar Rafat and Ayesha Moushumi	4:31
3.	"Emon Kore Keno Takao"	Sudip Kumar Dip	Sahriar Rafat	Konal and Sahriar Rafat	4:23
4.	"Kancha Pirit"	Priyo Chattopadhyay	Akassh	Trissha Chatterjee and Akassh	3:21
Total length:					16:18

The background score of Captain Khan was completely copied from the original Tamil film, which was composed by Yuvan Shankar Raja.

== Marketing and release ==
The first look poster of the film was released on August 12, 2018 on Shapla Media's Facebook page. The first look teaser of the film was released on Live Technologies Limited's YouTube channel on August 16, 2018.

=== Promotion ===
On 24 August 2018, lead actors Shakib Khan and Shobnom Bubly participated in Celebrity Cafe on Asian TV to promote the film.

=== Release ===
The film was released in 178 theaters across the country on August 22, 2018 on the occasion of Eid al-Adha.
