= Manjapai =

2014 Indian film by Raghavan

- Theatrical release poster
- Directed by: N. Ragavan
- Written by: N. Ragavan
- Produced by: N. Linguswamy; A. Sargunam (Presenters); N. Subash Chandrabose; A. Nandha Kumar
- Starring: Vimal; Rajkiran; Lakshmi Menon
- Cinematography: Masani
- Edited by: Deva
- Music by: N. R. Raghunanthan
- Production company: A Sarkunam Cinemaz
- Distributed by: Thirupathi Brothers
- Release date: 6 June 2014
- Running time: 136 minutes
- Country: India
- Language: Tamil

Manjapai (transl. Yellow Duffle) is a 2014 Indian Tamil-language comedy drama film written and directed by N. Ragavan in his debut. Produced by Thirrupathi Brothers and A Sarkunam Cinemaz, it stars Vimal, Rajkiran and Lakshmi Menon. The film saw its worldwide release on 6 June 2014 and became a sleeper hit. The film was remade in Telugu as Erra Bus (2014) and in Kannada by the same director as Mr. Mommaga (2016).

== Plot ==
The film starts with Tamil who is raised single-handedly by his grandfather, Venkatasamy in a village, as his parents had committed suicide after eloping and giving birth to him. 25 years later the boy is working in a Chennai-based IT company, staying in a modern upmarket apartment. Tamil meets Karthika, a medical student using tricks to get to the front of the traffic signal. They fall in love at first sight, and end up being so engrossed in each other that they don't realise that the signal had gone green. The way Karthika tricks the police officer and gets away with it endears Tamil to Karthika. He follows her and in no time she reciprocates.

Meanwhile, at work, Tamil is selected to go to US for a three-month project and he brings Venkatasamy to the city so that they can spend time together before he leaves for US. Venkatasamy, coming from a rustic background, is unfamiliar with the urban lifestyle of people in a modern city.

He bathes and washes his clothes at a fountain, causing much embarrassment to Tamil which he does not share with Venkatasamy. He causes further hardship by disturbing Tamil during his date with Karthika, causing a break-up between them. Venkatasamy infuriates Tamil further by slapping Karthika's father, an Inspector of Police, for allowing his daughter to wear short clothes in public. Tamil pleads with Karthika and finally she forgives him.

Tamil spends several nights working on a project on his laptop. Venkatasamy assumes the laptop to be a sandwich grill and without knowing how to use it, puts it on the stove causing the laptop to explode into pieces, destroying the project work. Tamil is sacked from his job as a result but hides his anger from Venkatasamy.

Karthika motivates Tamil to complete the project on her computer. The old man feels really guilty of destroying the laptop, and buys him a new one by selling his ancestral wedding ring. Tamil thanks his grandfather and starts working on the project. He finishes the project and gets his job back.

Meanwhile, the old man helps a couple elope and get them married the same way he did with Tamil's parents. While Tamil is leaving to attend an interview to go to the US, Venkatasamy mocks the US flag at the US consulate and thinks that the whites are conquering India again. He creates a nuisance and both of them are arrested. When they come out of the station, Tamil goes for a second interview but his visa is rejected; he scolds his grandfather amidst a large crowd.

A girl, Pooja, thinks that a piece of sweet laced with rat poison is a sweet that the old man gave her and faints after eating it. She was brought to the hospital and the old man is scolded in public for the second time by the girl's parents. The girl is cured thanks to the mixture of salt and tamarind water Venkatasamy gave Pooja before she was taken to the hospital, helping her to vomit and get rid of the poison.

When everyone wants to apologise and thank the old man, he goes missing and everyone starts to search for him. The old man is finally located but in a mentally challenged state. The film ends with Tamil regretting scolding his grandfather and crying while hugging him tightly.

== Cast ==
- Vimal as Tamil
- Lakshmi Menon as Karthika
- Rajkiran as Venkatasamy
- Ashvin Raja as Tamil's friend
- Yuvina Parthavi as Pooja
- Ravi Venkatraman as Karthika's father
- Kadhal Saravanan as Saravana
- Thangadurai as Traffic Inspector
- Uriyadi Suruli

== Production ==
Initially, when first reported in June 2012, it was said that the film starring Vimal would be directed by A. Sargunam simultaneously with his other project Naiyaandi. Though he quickly denied reports, citing that his assistant Naveen Raghavan would make his directorial debut with the project, while he would co-produce the film with his brother Nandha Kumar. In December 2012, Lakshmi Menon and Rajkiran were added to the cast. In January 2013, Thirupathi Brothers acquired the rights of the film to produce the film on "first copy basis".

The film began shooting schedules in March 2013. On 2 April 2014, the shooting was wrapped up by filming a song sequence in Chettinad Health City, Kelambakkam.

== Soundtrack ==
M. Ghibran was first signed to compose the soundtrack and score for the film, but he opted out of the project due to conflicting schedules. He was replaced by N. R. Raghunanthan. All lyrics were written by Yugabharathi. He also scored the music for Mr. Mommaga (2016).

Title	Singer	Length
"Aagaasa Nilavu"	S. P. Balasubrahmanyam	04:24
"Anbu Dhaan"	Krishnaraj	03:39
"Ayyo Ayyo"	Laxman, Rishi, Sailaxmi, Harish, Ayshwarya, Asvitha & Vaishali	03:37
"Paathu Paathu"	Hariharasudhan & Vandana Srinivasan	03:56
"Sattena"	Karthik	04:21

== Release ==
The satellite rights of the film were sold to Zee Thamizh.

=== Critical reception ===
Baradwaj Rangan from The Hindu wrote, "We've heard of movies that push the audience's buttons. Manjapai grabs a live wire and gooses the audience's behind — so desperate is it to evoke a reaction that it even has a little girl munching on rat poison". The Times of India gave 3 stars out of 5 and wrote, "Manja Pai is a good film with a solid message but if you aren't in the mood for gyan, then this movie might not be to your liking". Sify wrote, "Simplistic and sincere, Manja Pai has an old-fashioned plot and characters. It's got its heart in the right place, but sometimes that's not enough entertainment for today's audience". Rediff.com gave it 2 stars out of 5 and wrote, "Manjapai, with its cliched plot, has absolutely nothing new to offer", calling it "a very predictable and overemotional tale".

Deccan Chronicle gave the film 2.5 stars out of 5 and wrote, "The movie is watchable for its clean content and sincere effort by debutant director Raghavan". Behindwoods gave the film 2.25 stars out of 5 saying "Manja Pai is a crude term that refers to rural migrants arriving to take on the big city. While there was an opportunity for director N. Raghavan to present them as is, focusing on their ability to adapt, the director resorts to stereotypes instead, not just with these sons of the soil, but also with city dwellers. This may evoke sympathy but its certainly far from a confidence building measure for other 'old school' migrants". Indiaglitz.com gave it a score of 2.25 out of 5 and wrote, "Manjapai is definitely not on the lines of the previous films of the prestigious Thirrupathi Brothers banner. But it will not disappoint you if you go to the movie halls expecting some unadulterated entertainment filled with humor and sentiment".

=== Box office ===
The film collected nett collection of ₹15.5 million (US$160,000) in first day and around ₹75 million (US$780,000) in Tamil Nadu in first weekend. The film collected ₹16.6 million (US$170,000) in Chennai in ten days.
