= Thithikkudhe =

2003 film by Brinda Sarathy

- DVD cover
- Directed by: Brinda Sarathy
- Screenplay by: Brinda Sarathy
- Story by: M. S. Raju
- Based on: Manasantha Nuvve (Telugu)
- Produced by: R. B. Choudary
- Starring: Jiiva; Sridevi Vijaykumar
- Cinematography: Arthur A. Wilson
- Edited by: V. Jaishankar
- Music by: Vidyasagar
- Production company: Super Good Films
- Release date: 1 August 2003
- Country: India
- Language: Tamil

Thithikkudhe (transl. Oh the sweetness!) is a 2003 Indian Tamil-language romance film directed by Brinda Sarathy. It stars Jiiva and Sridevi Vijaykumar in the lead roles, while Shrutika, Vivek, Nassar, Devan and Madhan Bob play supporting roles. The film's score and music were composed by Vidyasagar. It is the Tamil remake of the Telugu Manasantha Nuvve (2001). It tells the story of two childhood friends and how they reunite some time later. The film was released on 1 August 2003.

== Plot ==
Chinnu and Anuradha (Anu) are childhood friends who live in a village. They always enjoy singing, dancing, playing and having fun together. Anu's father, who is a rich government official, gets transferred and relocates to another place with his family, which makes Anu lose contact with Chinnu. Before Anu leaves the village, she gifts a nice and beautiful musical watch to Chinnu as a token of her remembrance. Chinnu's mother passes away suddenly, and he is left alone. Chinnu is adopted by Chandramohan's family and gets renamed as Venu.

Venu is very attached to his adopted parents and looks after Chandramohan's music shop. Venu is in love with his childhood friend Anu, despite losing her contact with the hope of meeting her someday. Meanwhile, Anu too is in love with Chinnu with the same hope. Venu still preserves the musical watch gifted by Anu. Using her pen name, Renu, Anu writes a story about her life (called Thithikkudhe) in a weekly Ananda Vikadan magazine with the hope that Chinnu might read it and come to her.

Sruthi, a press reporter and the daughter of a magazine editor Sivaraman, is Venu's friend and she secretly too falls in love with him after realising his good nature. One day, Venu's sister's engagement was cancelled due to a misunderstanding, so Venu and Chandramohan go for a drink. Venu asks Sruthi to help them to get home. Sruthi sees them but drops Venu at home only. As Venu is drunk, he unknowingly gifts the musical watch to Sruthi, thanking her.

The next day, Anu comes to a store and gets surprised upon seeing the watch with Sruthi. Anu feels happy that her hope of finding Chinnu is going to come true. Sruthi says that the watch was gifted by her lover Venu, which shocks Anu. Now, Anu learns that Chinnu is none other than Venu, but she feels bad that he has forgotten her and has decided to love Sruthi.

Venu realizes that he has missed the watch as he does not remember giving it to Sruthi. When he realises this, he meets Sruthi and apologizes, asking her to return the watch as it is preserved by him as a memory of his childhood friend Anu. Sruthi is worried upon knowing that Venu is indeed in love with Anu. During their next meet, Sruthi informs this to Anu, and Anu is excited upon now knowing that Venu is also sharing the same feeling as her. She found Venu at a TV stage show where she saw him singing their friendship song, 'Mainave Mainave'. However, Anu doesn't disclose her true identity to him. She instead tries to befriend Venu as Renu and love him slowly.

Venu's sister is a very big fan of Renu's story that comes in the magazine. Venu gets introduced to Renu with the help of Sruthi as a writer. Knowing this, Venu requests Renu to visit his home and meet his sister so that she will feel excited. Renu agrees and comes to Venu's home. There, she meets Venu's adopted family and gets close with them.

Meanwhile, Anu's father wants her to marry a minister's son, Sridhar. Anu informs about her love for Chinnu to her father, for which he pretends accepting. One day, Venu reads Renu's Thithikkudhe story that has published in the Ananda Vikadan magazine and understands that Renu is, in fact, his childhood friend Anu who was playing with him as Renu all along. As Anu is away for a function, he waits for her return to propose his love towards her.

However, Anu's father meets Venu before that and asks him to go away from his daughter or else he will cause trouble during his sister's wedding. Venu fears that his sister's life should not be spoiled because of him. Therefore, he decides to sacrifice his love for his sister. When Anu arrives back, Venu hides his love by telling her that he is in love with another girl Renu, and there is no point in waiting for his childhood friend Anu. Anu, who was playing with Venu as Renu, is shocked to hear this.

On the day of Venu's sister's wedding as well as Anu's wedding with the minister's son, Shruti records the real reason and tells Anu. She now knows that Venu knows that Renu is Anu before meeting her and obeyed her father to go away from her for the well-being of his sister, thereby understands that Venu's love for her was true. She now rushes to meet Venu. A few goons sent by her father and the minister also follow Anu, which results in a fight between Venu and the goons. Venu gets stabbed by a rowdy and is admitted to the hospital with severe injuries. Anu takes the idol of their favourite lord, “Hanuman”, to the hospital and prays for Venu's recovery. The musical watch falls from Venu's shirt pocket. Venu hears the watch's music. Then, he wakes up and sees Anu, whom he loved in his childhood days. Venu's adopted family and friends and Anu's family accept their love. They both reunite in the end.

== Cast ==
- Jiiva as Chinnu / Venu
  - Viraj as young Chinnu
- Sridevi Vijaykumar as Anuradha (Anu) / Renu
  - Baby Sruthi as young Anu
- Shrutika as Sruthi, a press reporter and Venu's friend who secretly loves him
- Vivek as "Punch" Bala, Venu's best friend
- Nassar as Chandramohan, Venu's adopted father
- Devan as Anu's father
- Madhan Bob as Sivaraman, a magazine editor and Sruthi's father
- Sethu Vinayagam as the father of Rekha's potential groom
- Thadi Balaji as Maasilamani, a press reporter
- Visu as guest
- Fathima Babu as Sangeetha, Venu's adopted mother
- Kousalya Senthamarai as Bhanumathi, Chandramohan's mother
- Varshini as Rekha, Venu's younger sister
  - Baby Priyanka as Young Rekha
- Chitra Rangavasan as Anu's mother
- Nellai Siva
- Cell Murugan as Film director
- K. S. Jayalakshmi as Film financier
- Siva Narayana Murthy (uncredited)

== Production ==
Before the release of his debut film Aasai Aasaiyai (2003), Choudary planned Jiiva's second film as actor as he wanted his son to gain more experience acting in home productions before he does films for outside production companies. Choudary decided to remake the Telugu film Manasantha Nuvve (2001) in Tamil after he was impressed with the film while he was on a trip to Tirupathi and bought the remake rights. The film marked the directorial debut of Brinda Sarathy who earlier worked as dialogue writer for Aanandham (2001) and assisted N. Lingusamy thus becoming the 26th director to be introduced by Super Good films. Trisha was initially approached to feature in the film, but the role was later handed to Sridevi Vijaykumar. The filming was held at places like Tenkasi and Chennai while a song ("Mainave Mainave") was shot at Switzerland.

== Soundtrack ==
The soundtrack was composed by Vidyasagar, and lyrics written by Vairamuthu. "Mainave Mainave" was a reused version of the composer's own Malayalam song "Kannadi Koodum" from Pranayavarnangal. The song "Silendra Theepori Ondru" was reused in the Telugu movie Love Today as "Cheppave".

| Song title | Singers |
|---|---|
| "Silendra Theepori Ondru (Thithikudhe title track)" | Sujatha Mohan |
| "Mainave Mainave-1" | Chinmayi, Harini |
| "Mainave Mainave-2" | P. Unnikrishnan, Sadhana Sargam |
| "Iraq Yuthham" | Udit Narayan, Anuradha Sriram |
| "Oru Nimidamaa" | Tippu, Srivarthini |
| "Thaayarum Ariyaamal" | P. Unnikrishnan |

== Release and reception ==
The Hindu wrote "The title has an aesthetic touch and hence kindles your interest. Super Good Films' "Thithikudhae" is a decent, youthful flick from the house of R. B. Choudhary". Chennai Online wrote "Like the recent films from the 'Supergood' banner, this too is a soft, romantic feel-good entertainer. Only, in the gap between its Telugu original ('Manasantha Nuvve') and its Tamil remake, quite a few Tamil films have been released with this knot. So, one cannot but have a sense of deja vu throughout !". Visual Dasan of Kalki praised the film for portraying the love of film's leads realistically and also praised the performances of lead pair and Vivek's humour. Cinesouth wrote "The only good thins about the film are the scenes on Jeeva's and Sridevi's childhood, the excitement when they meet, songs and Sridevi's good looks. Everything else is…not so sweet". Sify wrote "Jeeva has to show more maturity and he looks uncomfortable in romantic scenes. This young man has to improve on his emotions and dialogue delivery to become a full-fledged hero. Sridevi as Anu is appealing. [..] Sruthika is good in her short role and so is Nassar. [..] The music of Vidyasagar and Arthur Wilson’s camera are commendable." According to Jiiva, despite film receiving positive reviews, it did only average at the box-office.
