= Ceylon (film) =

2013 Indian film by Santosh Sivan

- Theatrical poster
- Directed by: Santosh Sivan
- Screenplay by: Santosh Sivan; Zazy; Sharanya Rajgopal
- Produced by: Mubina Rattonsey; Santosh Sivan; N. Subash Chandrabose
- Starring: S. Karan; Sugandha Ram; Saritha
- Narrated by: Arvind Swamy
- Cinematography: Santosh Sivan
- Edited by: T. S. Suresh
- Music by: Vishal Chandrasekhar
- Production companies: Santosh Sivan Films; Thirrupathi Brothers Film Media
- Release dates: 5 October 2013 (Busan International Film Festival); 28 March 2014
- Running time: 125 minutes
- Country: India
- Languages: Tamil; English

Ceylon, titled Inam in Tamil, is a 2013 Indian war film written, directed, filmed and produced by Santosh Sivan. The story revolves around a group of teenagers in an orphanage set during the civil war in Sri Lanka. The film premiered at the 2013 Busan International Film Festival and had a theatrical release in India on 28 March 2014. Although it was positively reviewed by critics, the film was withdrawn by Linguswamy (who bought the distribution rights for the film) from theaters, after it was met with protests from various Tamil groups in Tamil Nadu.

== Plot ==
Rajini, a Sri Lankan Tamil girl, narrates the horrific tale of why she had to leave her homeland and become a refugee in India.

== Cast ==
- Karan S as Nandan
- Sugandha Ram as Rajini
- Saritha as Tsunami Akka
- Karunas as Stanley
- Shyam Sundar as Ravi
- Janaki as Stella
- Soumya Sadanand
- Vikram Chakravarti
- M. K. Vijayan
- Malini Sathappan
- Thaslim
- Mime Gopi

== Production ==
In 2009, it was first reported that Santhosh Sivan's next film would be "a hard-hitting political film scripted around the LTTE (Liberation Tigers of Tamil Eelam)-related strife and the death of its leader Velupillai Prabhakaran". In June 2012 then he stated "in Ceylon I want to look at the Sri Lankan situation from the perspective of a bunch of youngsters who get caught in the crisis. It's more about the outsiders' response to the horrors than about the politics". He also told that he will shoot in Sri Lanka after the rains and that he didn't want "Ceylon to look like a tourist's attraction". Sivan described Ceylon as his pet-project.

Santosh Sivan later said that the film was about "a bunch of teenagers in an orphanage, and set against the backdrop of a civil strife". One of the teenagers, the protagonist was a 16-year-old boy, Karan, with Down's Syndrome with whom Sivan spent nine months before shooting the film. Sugandha Ram, who acted in Tere Bin Laden before, was chosen to portray the female lead. Sugandha later told that the film was offered in 2010 to her but did not happen then and that the script was later altered and she got an opportunity to audition for the role again. It was reported that Saritha played the role of a person who runs the orphanage. According to Sivan, the idea for the film was conceived over a Sri Lankan lunch with a friend during which they met a lady who ran an orphanage in Sri Lanka. Sivan wanted director Stanley for a role, but cast Karunas for it since he could also sing. Karunas was said to have done a serious role unlike his usual comic self. Sivan stated, "my film is about human aspirations and emotions shattered by the war, not about the politics behind it". He also clarified the film will have nothing to do with the LTTE. Sivan spent months researching and getting footage for the film. He shot it in Tamil as Inam but also made the film into English for a larger audience and titled it Ceylon. The Tamil version was longer and included songs, scenes for comic relief and the making of the film over end credits and the English version, Sivan said, "is much tighter".

The film was shot by Sivan himself in various locations including Kerala, Thirunelveli, Rameswaram and Maharashtra with a Red Epic digital camera. Since he could not go for many takes, three or four cameras were used at the same time. Though he used a high-end digital camera he said that he purposely made the shots look candid as if they had been captured through a mobile phone or a hand-held camera as he found out that mobile phones played an important role in the Sri Lankan wars. Editor Suresh was also asked "to keep all good-looking shots aside" as Sivan felt that the film "should be raw and rustic" and not beautiful.

The first look resembling a blood splattered fingerprint forming the map of Sri Lanka, which was designed by Jairam Posterwala, was revealed in June 2013. Arvind Swamy provided a voice-over for the film. The film was cleared by the Censor Board in October 2013. Actor Udhaya's wife Keerthika Udhaya had dubbed for Sugandha in all versions.

== Music ==
Vishal Chandrasekhar was signed as the music director. Sivan stated that "the background score is heart thumping" since it was a thriller film, but that a Baila, and "a few romantic numbers, treaded in a different way" were also included.

== Release ==
The film was first screened at the 18th Busan International Film Festival. The film's Tamil Nadu distribution rights were bought by N. Lingusamy's Thirrupathi Brothers in February 2014. Prior to the theatrical release, Sivan and Thirrupathi Brothers held premiere shows in Chennai and Mumbai. The film was released in Tamil Nadu theatres on 28 March 2014.

Following protests from Thanthai Periyar Dravidar Kazhagam (TDMK) activists, who had attacked the Balaji Theatre in Puducherry, stating the film projects the Sri Lankan Civil War in bad light, four scenes and one dialogue were removed the following day. After Marumalarchi Dravida Munnetra Kazhagam politician Vaiko too severely criticized the film for being pro-Sinhalese, Lingusamy decided to stop screening and withdraw the film from theatres from 31 March 2014 onwards.

== Critical reception ==
After its theatrical release, it received positive reviews from critics. Sify wrote, "Inam is a charming film that pulls at your heart strings. Santosh has made a film on a very sensitive subject, but has handled it beautifully without any propaganda, preaching or twisting of facts" and called it "very good". Behindwoods gave it 3.25 stars out of 5 and called it "a disturbing tale, brilliantly captured". Baradwaj Rangan from The Hindu wrote, "Sivan is happiest when concocting near-surreal imagery that hints at mood rather than tells a story. The big scenes, on the other hand, don’t work as well. The slice-and-dice vignettes approach results in broad characters rather than complex people capable of holding together a sustained narrative. The effort to humanise them (at least cinematically) through songs doesn’t work". The Times of India gave the film 3.5 stars out of 5 and wrote, "Inam is very much topical and mostly presents a neutral perspective on the last phase of the brutal civil war. It wants to show how war can tear apart the moral fibre of humans, and how it affects even those who aren't involved in the fighting...Yet, somehow, Inam stops short of being a hard-hitting film. It is very reluctant to spell things out, which...makes everything a little hazy, as the context isn't firmly established...there are times when we can see Sivan leaning a little too much on his visuals to create the desired impact". Hindustan Times wrote, "Although the plot is wafer thin, Sivan’s script includes an array of anecdotes to keep the movie moving. If there is a flip side to Inam, it lies in its utter melancholy. Despite, Sivan’s efforts to inject a bit of joy through songs and wit, the film refuses to rise above excruciating sorrow". The New Indian Express wrote, "Inam is a pretentious piece of work, one is not exactly sure what the director wishes to convey. The film is neither entertaining nor thought provoking. There is a total lack of clarity of purpose, focus and sensitivity". IANS gave it 4 stars out of 5 and wrote, "Inam comes straight from the heart of Santosh Sivan. It deserves to be accepted, embraced and celebrated".

The Hollywood Reporter in its review wrote, "Romancing in slow-motion; musical numbers ill-fitting the narrative flow; high-octane shootouts laced with the odd comic touch; a highly-strung, tragic final half hour intended to stir emotions – Santosh Sivan’s latest offering boasts of all the hallmarks of commercial Indian cinema, which should allow the Kerala-born director to continue the fine run he has had in the past few years...but more focus and context would have helped the film live up to its seemingly more historical-epic title of Ceylon". Gulf News wrote, "Director Santosh Sivan has crafted his characters with great care and their unique traits set each one apart. Matched with a laudable performance by the cast, Inam keeps the audience engaged. With Sivan’s signature on every frame, Inam is sheer poetry".
