= The Warriorr =

2022 film directed by N. Lingusamy

- Theatrical release poster
- Directed by: N. Lingusamy
- Screenplay by: N. Lingusamy
- Dialogues by: Sai Madhav Burra (Telugu) Brinda Sarathy (Tamil)
- Story by: N. Lingusamy
- Produced by: Srinivasa Chitturi; Pavan Kumar (presenter)
- Starring: Ram Pothineni; Aadhi Pinisetty; Krithi Shetty; Nadhiya; Akshara Gowda
- Cinematography: Sujith Vaassudev
- Edited by: Naveen Nooli
- Music by: Devi Sri Prasad
- Production company: Srinivasaa Silver Screen
- Distributed by: Masterpiece (Tamil Nadu)
- Release date: 14 July 2022
- Running time: 155 minutes
- Country: India
- Languages: Telugu; Tamil
- Budget: ₹70 crore
- Box office: est. ₹36.90 crore

The Warriorr is a 2022 Indian action drama film directed by N. Lingusamy and produced by Srinivasa Chitturi under Srinivasa Silver Screen. The film was shot simultaneously in Telugu and Tamil languages. It stars Ram Pothineni and Krithi Shetty (both in their Tamil debut), with Aadhi Pinisetty, Nadhiya and Akshara Gowda. The music was composed by Devi Sri Prasad, while the cinematography and editing were handled by Sujith Vaassudev and Naveen Nooli.

Linguswamy began contemplating a Telugu–Tamil bilingual film in 2016, which would make his directorial debut in Telugu cinema. The film was announced in February 2021 with Ram Pothineni as the lead. Principal photography begun in July 2021 and concluded in May 2022 with filming taking place primarily in Hyderabad and Chennai.

The Warriorr was released on 14 July 2022 to negative reviews from critics and became a box-office bomb.

== Plot ==
Satya, an MBBS graduate, relocates to Kurnool with his mother and sister Nithya after receiving a job as a doctor in a government hospital. Satya also learns about Gururaj "Guru", a ruthless gangster, whose company has been manufacturing toxic saline and is involved in the medical mafia. This results in the deaths of three children in the hospital, but the police do not pay heed as they are afraid of Guru's atrocities. Satya lodges a complaint against Guru with sufficient evidence against him. Guru learns about this and thrashes Satya at the Konda Reddy Fort and hangs him. Satya is saved by the hospital dean Dr. Robert, and he leaves the city with his mother and sister.

Two years later, Satya returns to Kurnool as the DSP of the city, where he wages a war against Guru and his men. Satya learns that Robert died in an accident, which he suspects Guru was involved in. Satya receives permission for a re-autopsy of Robert's body. He exhumes the body but finds it is someone else's corpse in the grave. Guru reveals to Satya that he killed Robert when the latter helped Satya escape from the city earlier. Guru also reveals that he killed Rahim for protecting the evidence against him. The next day, Guru contests in the elections, but Satya arrests him after finding a flash drive which contains information about Guru's illegal activities.

Guru's wife Swarna plots to kill Satya by strangling him, but Satya's RJ girlfriend "Whistle" Mahalakshmi gets stuck on the ropes and receives a major cut on her throat as she was following Satya. Satya admits her to the hospital and learns that Guru has been released from prison. After being encouraged by his mother, Satya calls Guru to the Konda Reddy Fort for a final showdown. Satya brutally kills Guru in a hand-to-hand combat and hangs him in the same manner that Guru hanged him before. After Guru's death, Satya relocates to North India with Mahalakshmi, who survived the injury, and his mother. Satya also continues to work both as a cop and a doctor.

== Cast ==
- Ram Pothineni as DSP. Dr. Sathya, MBBS,IPS
- Krithi Shetty as "Whistle" Mahalakshmi
- Aadhi Pinisetty as Gururaj
- Nadhiya as Satya's mother
- Akshara Gowda as Swarna
- Posani Krishna Murali as Madhav, Mahalakshmi's father
- Brahmaji as SI B. Devaraj
- Ajay as Ravi
- Jayaprakash as Dr. Robert
- Lal as Kumarappa
- Redin Kingsley as Prisoner
- John Vijay as SP Joshua
- Brinda Sarathy as an ill husband's wife
- Pradeep Mama
- D. L. R.
- S. P. Sreekumar as Guru's henchman
- Raaghavan as Tea Boy
- Rohit Pathak as Mannaar
- Sharanya Pradeep as Nithya, Satya's sister
- Meka Ramakrishna
- Naga Mahesh as N. Srinivas
- Divya Sripada as News Reporter
- Chatrapathi Sekhar as Babu (uncredited)

== Production ==
=== Development ===
In 2016, Tamil film director Lingusamy announced that he planned to make a bilingual film in Telugu and Tamil, marking his Telugu debut. He first approached Allu Arjun to star in the film, but the film was delayed due to Allu Arjun's busy schedule. In 2019, Havish was cast as the lead, but the film never began production. On 18 February 2021, it was announced that Ram Pothineni was brought on board the film, which was tentatively called RAPO19 with Srinivasa Chitturi producing the film under his banner Srinivasa Silver Screen. The film marks the Tamil debut of Pothineni after Yen Endral Kadhal Enben!, the Tamil version of Endukante... Premanta! (2012), failed to have a theatrical release. In January 2022, the film's title was announced as The Warriorr.

=== Casting ===
In March 2021, it was announced that Krithi Shetty was cast as the female lead. In July 2021, the makers announced that Aadhi Pinisetty was cast as the main antagonist in the film. In August 2021, it was announced that Akshara Gowda was signed on to play a pivotal role in the film.

=== Filming ===
Since the film was a Telugu—Tamil bilingual, scenes involving Ram Pothineni and Aadhi Pinisetty were shot in both Telugu and Tamil. Krithi Shetty's scenes were only shot in Telugu, and Nadhiya's scenes were only shot in Tamil. Principal photography for the film began on 13 July 2021 in Hyderabad and Chennai. The second schedule of the film was completed in October 2021. The third schedule began in January 2022 and filming was wrapped up at the end of May 2022.

== Music ==
The Warriorr

Soundtrack album by Devi Sri Prasad
- Released: 12 July 2022
- Recorded: 2021–2022
- Genre: Feature film soundtrack
- Length: 15:26
- Languages: Telugu; Tamil
- Label: Aditya Music
- Producer: Devi Sri Prasad

Devi Sri Prasad chronology
F3 (2022)	The Warriorr (2022)	Ranga Ranga Vaibhavanga (2022)

Singles from The Warriorr
- 1. "Bullet Song" Released: 22 April 2022; 2. "Dhada Dhada" Released: 4 June 2022; 3. "Whistle Song" Released: 22 June 2022; 4. "Colours Song" Released: 6 July 2022

The film score and soundtrack album of the film are composed by Devi Sri Prasad in his first collaboration with Lingusamy. The music rights were acquired by Aditya Music.

Telugu
No.	Title	Lyrics	Singer(s)	Length
1.	"Bullet Song"	Sri Mani	Silambarasan, Haripriya	3:57
2.	"Dhada Dhada"	Sri Mani	Haricharan	4:29
3.	"Whistle Song"	Sahithi	Rahul Sipligunj, Srinisha Jayaseelan	3:46
4.	"Colours Song"	Ramajogayya Sastry	Jaspreet Jasz	4:20
Total length:				15:26

Tamil
No.	Title	Lyrics	Singer(s)	Length
1.	"Bullet Song"	Viveka	Silambarasan, Haripriya	3:57
2.	"Dhada Dhada"	Viveka	Haricharan	4:09
3.	"Whistle Song"	Viveka	Anthony Daasan, Srinisha Jayaseelan	3:26
4.	"Colours Song"	Viveka	Nakul Abhyankar	4:00
Total length:				15:26

== Release ==
=== Theatrical ===
In March 2022, it was announced that the film was going to release theatrically on 14 July 2022. The film's pre-release rights were sold for ₹43.10 crore, the highest for Pothineni's film to date.

=== Home media ===
The television rights for Telugu and Hindi Version were acquired by Star Network and Tamil version rights were acquired by Zee Tamil and Zee Thirai respectively. The film started streaming in Telugu version on Disney+Hotstar from 11 August 2022, while the Tamil version started streaming on Amazon Prime Video from 10 November 2023.

== Reception ==
=== Box office ===
The Warriorr grossed ₹12.2 crore on its opening day, with ₹10.2 crore coming from the states of Andhra Pradesh and Telangana.

=== Critical response ===
The Warriorr received generally negative reviews from critics. On the review aggregator website Rotten Tomatoes, 17% of 6 critics' reviews are positive, with an average rating of 3.5/10.

Neeshita Nyayapati of The Times of India gave 3/5 stars and wrote "The Warriorr is a masala-laden commercial pot-boiler that’s meant to be watched over a shared bucket of popcorn." Latha Srinivasan of Firstpost gave 1.5/5 stars and wrote "Director Lingusamy's Telugu debut starring Ram Pothineni is a mish-mash of his earlier films."

Balakrishna Ganeshan of The News Minute gave 1.5/5 stars and wrote "The story being extremely superficial without any element of reality in it, also makes it a mediocre watch." Janani K of India Today gave 1/5 stars and wrote "The Warriorr is a mass action entertainer, which is ridiculous and has nothing new to offer."

Bhuvanesh Chandar of The Hindu wrote "The Warriorr’s lifeless storyline is made worse with its generic scene writing and a template screenplay structure." Manoj Kumar R of The Indian Express wrote "Lingusamy has repeated the same movie that he has been making throughout his career with different actors and costumes, including the 'loosu ponnu' archetype".
