= Anjaan (2014 film) =

2014 Indian film by N. Lingusamy

- Theatrical release poster
- Directed by: N. Lingusamy
- Written by: Brinda Sarathy (dialogues)
- Screenplay by: N. Linguswamy
- Story by: N. Linguswamy
- Produced by: Siddharth Roy Kapur; N. Subash Chandrabose
- Starring: Suriya; Samantha Ruth Prabhu; Vidyut Jammwal; Manoj Bajpayee
- Cinematography: Santosh Sivan
- Edited by: Anthony
- Music by: Yuvan Shankar Raja
- Production company: Thirrupathi Brothers
- Distributed by: UTV Motion Pictures
- Release dates: 14 August 2014 (Kuala Lumpur); 15 August 2014 (Worldwide)
- Running time: 160 minutes
- Country: India
- Language: Tamil

Anjaan (transl. Fearless Man) is a 2014 Indian Tamil-language action film written and directed by N. Lingusamy and produced by Thirupathi Brothers and distributed by UTV Motion Pictures. The film stars Suriya, alongside Samantha Ruth Prabhu, Vidyut Jammwal, Manoj Bajpayee, Dalip Tahil, Murali Sharma, Joe Malloori, Soori, Chetan Hansraj, Sanjana Singh and Asif Basra in supporting roles. The film follows a man who arrives in Mumbai looking for his elder gangster brother and learns of the events behind his disappearance.

The project was reported in July 2012 marking the maiden collaboration with Suriya and Lingusamy and was set to begin production after the former's commitments on other films. Principal photography began on 20 November 2013 and was completed on 23 June 2014, where the film was predominantly shot in Mumbai, with the exception of one song sequence which was filmed in Goa. The music was composed by Yuvan Shankar Raja, while cinematography and editing were handled by Santosh Sivan and Anthony.

Anjaan premiered at Kuala Lumpur on 14 August 2014, and theatrically released on 15 August 2014, coinciding with India's Independence Day. The film received mixed reviews from critics with praise for Suriya's performance, action sequences, music and cinematography. Criticism was directed towards the plot and duration. A re-edited version of the film released on 28 November 2025. The film was later remade in Bangladeshi as Captain Khan (2018).

== Plot ==
Krishna, a disabled man, arrives in Mumbai from Kanyakumari to find his elder brother Raju. A taxi driver named Raja drives him to a bar, where he tries to inquire about Raju from the henchmen of Raju's former associate Amar, but is rebuffed. Raju's friend Rajiv tells him that Raju was a top gangster. Krishna meets Raju's old enemy JK, who reveals Raju spared his life when he could've killed him. JK tells Krishna about Karim Bhai, a close friend of Raju. Upon meeting Karim, Krishna learns about Raju's past.

In the past, Raju and his brotherly friend Chandru were powerful gangsters to whom Karim himself is a personal friend, while Johnny, Rajiv, Jackie, Manoj, and Amar are their henchmen. The new police commissioner R. Ashok Kumar tries to get rid of them, but Raju kidnaps Ashok's daughter Jeeva on the night of her marriage, in exchange for freeing his men. Ashok is forced to agree, but Jeeva explains that she did not want to get married, and her kidnapping is also her consent. Raju and Jeeva soon fall in love with each other. Raju and Chandru eventually meet Imran Bhai, a powerful crime boss from Dubai, who initially praises them for their work but eventually insults and warns them.

Chandru takes the insult seriously and stays awake all night, but becomes delighted upon finding that Raju kidnapped him at the party itself. The duo meets Imran, who is held captive by Rajiv, and has their verbal revenge. A delighted Chandru gifts a new car to Raju, who later finds Jeeva inside. Chandru tells Raju to enjoy the vacation with Jeeva. During their vacation, Raju and Jeeva are attacked, but they manage to escape. Returning to his hood, Raju is shattered and enraged to find Chandru's mutilated corpse, and he orders Amar to accompany him in killing Imran. However, Amar betrays Raju, shooting him and throwing him into the water.

In the present, Krishna is told by Karim to stay hidden when Amar arrives at his taxi station, but is spotted and reveals that he killed Raju. Amar orders his henchmen to kill Krishna, but Krishna, who is revealed to be Raju, fights off everyone and shoots Amar dead. Raju tells Karim that he intends to stay as Krishna until his mission to hunt down the traitors is accomplished, and stays at Karim's house. Karim says that Chandru was supposed to meet JK on the day he died, and Jackie did not tag along. Raju finds Jackie at a horse-racing stadium and chases him, prompting Jackie to reveal that he tried to contact Raju (who was on vacation) and Chandru, but Johnny answered Chandru's call. Suspecting a mishap, Jackie escaped. Raju catches Johnny using the latter's girlfriend Sindhu and finds out what really happened to Chandru on that day.

On the day of the meeting between Chandru and JK, Imran and his henchmen arrive instead of JK. Chandru fights them off but is held by Johnny, Amar, and Manoj (who were bribed by Imran), and is stabbed to death by Imran. Raju calls Chandru to ask about his safety but is answered by Amar, who lied about Chandru being in a meeting.

Learning the truth, Raju kills Johnny and proceeds to kill Manoj, along with his henchmen, in an ensuing fight. Raju tries to kill Imran at his birthday party, but ends up shooting only his virtual projection telecast from Dubai. Raju and Karim learn that Imran's henchmen arrived at Karim's house and kidnapped his daughter Saira, but Karim reveals that Saira was actually Jeeva. Jeeva wanted to stay away and keep in touch with Raju by wearing a burqa. Raju goes to the spot, fights off all the henchmen, and rescues Jeeva, only to be captured and brought to Imran by his henchmen. Imran's henchmen betray him by helping Raju kill Imran, and Raju fatally stabs Imran to death, avenging Chandru's death. Before leaving, Raju shoots the henchmen and says that even enemies must not have traitors. Before leaving Mumbai, Raju and Jeeva meet Raja, who is shocked to learn that Krishna was Raju all along.

== Cast ==
- Suriya as Krishna / Raju Bhai
- Samantha Ruth Prabhu as Jeeva (Voice dubbed by M. M. Manasi)
- Vidyut Jammwal as Chandru Bhai (Voice dubbed by Abhinay)
- Manoj Bajpayee as Imran Bhai (Voice dubbed by Chetan)
- Dalip Tahil as JK
- Soori as Raja
- Joe Malloori as Karim Bhai
- Murali Sharma as Johnny
- Asif Basra as Rajiv
- Chetan Hansraj as Manoj
- Bikramjeet Kanwarpal as Commissioner R. Ashok Kumar IPS
- Manoj Misra as Jackie
- Bobby Bedi as Amar
- Sanjana Singh as Sindhu
- Manobala as Director
- Pradeep Kabra as Local Goon
- Brahmanandam as Guru Shastri
- Rajeevan as himself (cameo appearance)
- Chitrangada Singh as a bar dancer (item number in the song "Sirippu En")
- Maryam Zakaria as a bar dancer (item number in song "Bang Bang Bang")

== Production ==
=== Development ===
In July 2012, it was reported first that Suriya had signed on for a film directed and produced by N. Lingusamy under his Thirrupathi Brothers banner and that he would work on it after Maattrraan (2012) and Singam 2 (2013). After the completion of both films, the actor was reported to work simultaneously with Lingusamy and director Gautham Vasudev Menon for a film titled Dhruva Natchathiram. Suriya waited for six months after Singam 2, but failed to receive a complete script from Gautham Menon and no progress took place in this period of time. Owing to this reason, he opted out of Menon's film in October 2013 and announced that he would soon start work on Lingusamy's film. The director confirmed the news and also stated the film would officially start filming from mid-November 2013.

"When it was decided that Suriya and I will make a film together, I started narrating scripts to him. Like the fairy in Aesop's fable, I kept narrating stories one after the other but like the woodcutter, he kept saying 'This is not mine' even when I showed him the gold one! And, suddenly, I remembered the one-line story I'd told Karthi. So, in one week, I discussed with my team and readied a proper script. I gave a one-and-a-half-hour narration to Suriya and when I finished, he said, 'This is what I was looking for'. That seemed like a sign from above for me to go into this project without any doubts."

— N. Lingusamy

Lingusamy recalled that when he decided to collaborate with Suriya, he had narrated multiple scripts, which the latter rejected it. After he remembered the one-line narration he had written for Karthi, he then discussed with his team and prepared a script based on it which Suriya was impressed by the narration. He added that the script was written specifically for Suriya, where unlike his other action films which were character-driven, Lingusamy made it with a mass appeal where "his very presence on screen should have fans clapping and whistling", in comparison with Vijay's Pokkiri and Ajith Kumar's Billa (both 2007). Lingusamy stated that the gangster element was mostly a backdrop, while "the story is more about friendship, romance and twists and turns", while further adding that since the protagonist is from the underworld, the film was set in Mumbai, and not about a realistic depiction of gangster's lives.

S. D. Vijay Milton was initially roped in as the film's cinematographer in June 2013, but in that October he was replaced by Santosh Sivan, who collaborates with Lingusamy for the first time. Lingusamy further renewed his norm technicians, which includes music director Yuvan Shankar Raja, editor Anthony, production designer Rajeevan, action director Stunt Silva and dialogue writer Brinda Sarathy. In September 2013, reports surfaced that the film would be titled Rowdy, which Lingusamy dismissed it. The film began production without a title, before the official title Anjaan was announced in January 2014. The same month, a press statement from Thirrupathi Brothers revealed that UTV Motion Pictures would co-produce and distribute the film, in their second consecutive collaboration with the banner after Vettai (2012).

=== Casting ===
Suriya was said to possess dual roles with two different appearances for filming. The first of his appearance, being a "raw and jagged look" according to Lingusamy, where he would be seen growing beard for his role, whereas his other look not being revealed and kept as a surprise. In November 2012, it was reported that Samantha Ruth Prabhu has been cast as the female lead. Vidyut Jammwal was confirmed to play an important role in the film. Speaking to Srinivasa Ramanujam of The Hindu, Jammwal added that he met Lingusamy at the after-party of an award function where the latter was interested to cast him for the film. Soon after, he received a call from the production house and eventually auditioned for an important role in the film. Though he was not playing an antagonist role unlike his previous films, Jammwal revealed that: "Suriya and my characters are partners in crime, brothers in arms. It's a role I haven't done before and I'm really excited about it."

Manoj Bajpayee was reported to be playing the film's antagonist. Dalip Tahil was signed on for the role of a small, but powerful don in the film. Vivek was initially approached to play a comedic role in the film but could not take up the offer as a result of date clashes with Vai Raja Vai. Instead, he was replaced by Soori in March 2014. Sana Khan was approached to do a special number in the film but she declined the offer as she prioritized to promote her Bollywood film Jai Ho (2014). Actress Maryam Zakaria was chosen to do an item number in the film. Chitrangada Singh was chosen for another item number after discussions to have Sonakshi Sinha and Kareena Kapoor, in the song were unsuccessful.

=== Filming ===
In mid-October 2013, a test shoot occurred with Suriya and Malavika Rampradeep, a Bharatanatyam dancer, at the Prasad Studios in Chennai, where Sivan used the Red Dragon 6K Digital camera along with a high zoom lens. Sivan reported that it was the first film in the word to be shot with this camera, a technology which had not been used in Hollywood films. On 15 November, Suriya completed a photo-shoot of the film which was done by still photographer Venket Ram.

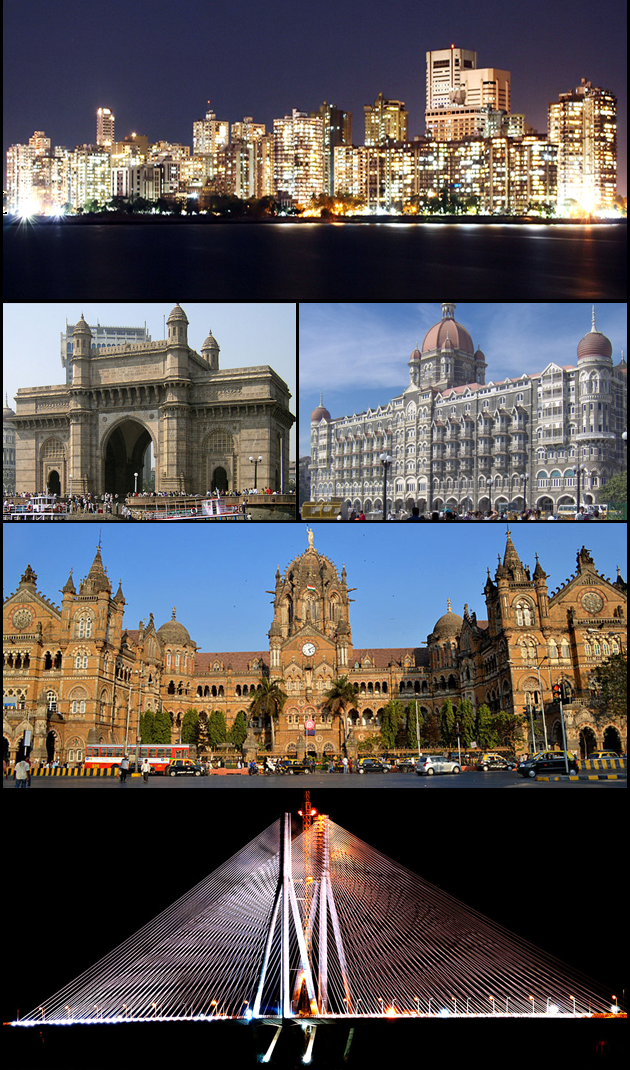
The film was predominantly shot in Mumbai.

Principal photography began on 20 November 2013 in Mumbai with a proposed month-long schedule. In December 2013, filming halted as Samantha developed a mild skin irritation as a result of shooting in extreme heat conditions. This resulted the lead actors and the unit to return to Chennai. Filming resumed a few days later, with an intro song ("Bang Bang Bang") being shot with Suriya, Jammwal and Zakaria. A specially constructed set was erected at Borivali to shoot the song, which costed them ₹80 lakh (US$83,000). Filming continued in late December, where the team shot some "breezy, lighthearted sequences" featuring Suriya and Samantha. The latter had participated for the shoot for ten days due to her commitments for filming in Rabhasa. The first schedule was wrapped in early January 2014.

Filming for the second schedule commenced in late-January. In early February, the crew filmed a song sequence featuring Suriya and Samantha ("Ek Do Teen") in Panchgani where the song was shot for seven days. After a brief break, the team started filming for the third schedule on 5 March 2014. An item number featuring Bajpayee and Singh ("Sirippu En") was shot in this schedule. On 30 March 2014, the team canned few action sequences at the Chhatrapati Shivaji Terminus train station but was halted in the afternoon due to protesters shouting slogans against Lingusamy and Sivan. They demanded on the removal of Inam from theatres, which Lingusamy had distributed. Lingusamy then sorted out the issues with the protestors on their demands and restarted filming the following day.

In mid-April, the team left to Goa for filming few portions with the lead actors. It was further reported that Samantha had completed filming her talkie portions, with only one song being left to be filmed. During this schedule, Suriya suffered a minor ligament tear in his knees after a fighter who weighed about 120 kg fell from a height on his leg. This resulted in the actor taking a break from filming. The team then resumed the final schedule in early June with the song "Oru Kan JaadaI" being filmed at the Morjim and Miramar beaches of Goa. In mid-June, the team left to Mumbai for patchwork filming which was completed by 21 June 2014.

== Music ==
The soundtrack and the score for the film were composed by Yuvan Shankar Raja, making Anjaan the fourth collaboration between Yuvan and Lingusamy. The soundtrack album features five tracks, written by Viveka, Na. Muthukumar, Kabilan and Madhan Karky. The album was released on 23 July 2014 with positive reviews. The male portion of one of the songs, "Ek Do Theen", was sung by Suriya and became his first attempt at playback singing.

== Marketing ==
The film's title design and logo were released on 30 April 2014, followed by the first look posters of the film on May Day, 1 May 2014. A behind-the-scenes program was aired on Sun TV on the same date. The teaser trailer of the film was launched along with that of Kamal Haasan-starrer Uttama Villain during the 8th Vijay Awards held on 5 July 2014 and was simultaneously uploaded to YouTube. The teaser met with positive reception and crossed one million views within 48 hours of its release. The teaser success function was held on 8 July 2014. The trailer of the film was released on 8 August 2014 and aired on Sun Music.

The official game titled Anjaan Race Wars was developed by Vroovy, a joint venture between Hungama Digital Media Entertainment and Gameshastra, who had previously developed and released the official movie games of Kochadaiiyaan (2014). It was released on 29 July 2014 with a launch event for the game being held in Chennai. The game play revolved around Suriya chasing the goons in a car. The features of the game included two types of AI – One of them shooting and the other ones try to run away, 5 different cars, including Hummer, featured in the game. Power-ups included Nitro, Fuel, Ammo, Instant repair and Shield, while the weapons included Pistol and Shotgun. The game is available on Android and iOS operating systems.

Lingusamy and Suriya went to promote the film in Kochi. Two days before the film's release, Samantha and Lingusamy promoted the film at The Forum Vijaya Mall in Chennai. The entire crew of the film, including Suriya, Vidyut Jamwal, Lingusamy, Brinda Sarathy and Yuvan Shankar Raja, attended the premiere of the film at Kuala Lumpur.

== Release ==
Anjaan premiered at Kuala Lumpur, Malaysia on 14 August 2014, and was theatrically released on 15 August coinciding with India's Independence Day. The film premiered around over 1,500 screens in South India and overseas, becoming the widest release for a Suriya's film. It reportedly set a record for the pre-release business of Tamil films as it made around ₹87 crore (US$9.0 million) from its distribution, satellite and music rights. The overseas distribution rights for the film were acquired by United India Exports, as well as the Andhra Pradesh and Telangana theatrical rights for the dubbed version Sikandar, being acquired by Sridhar Lagadapati under Larsco Entertainment. The television rights were sold to Sun TV for ₹16 crore (US$1.7 million).

To counter unauthorized copying, the owners decided that the film would release only through digital screens and no physical print was allowed for screening it anywhere. Since the film was shot with 6K resolution, physical prints offered no additional quality anyway. The makers wanted only digital projection of Anjaan, enabling its makers to easily find the sources of leaks through identifying codes. As a result of this initiative, Anjaan became the first Indian film which had a 100% digital release.

Post-release, 20 minutes of the film had been trimmed due to negative reception over the film's length. The comedic portions featuring Brahmanandam were excluded in the original version, while his scenes were retained in the Telugu-dubbed version.

== Reception ==
=== Box office ===
Anjaan collected ₹15.03 crore (US$1.6 million) from Tamil Nadu, Kerala, Karnataka regions during the first two days of its release, whereas the Telugu version Sikandar collected ₹4.28 crore (US$440,000) on its first day. Anjaan also collected ₹45 crore (US$4.7 million) on its opening weekend worldwide, with ₹30 crore (US$3.1 million) from the domestic regions.

A re-edited version of the film was released in theatres on 28 November 2025. The re-release earned around ₹50 lakh from Tamil Nadu on its first day.

=== Critical response ===
Anjaan opened to mixed reviews from critics and audience with praise for Suriya's performance, action sequences, music and cinematography, but criticism directed towards the plot, screenplay and duration.

M. Suganth of The Times of India gave two stars out of five and wrote, "The film would have at least been bearable if it had taken only two hours to narrate the same plot, which often feels like an uninspiring retread of previous films". A reviewer based at IANS wrote, "Suriya gives an earnest performance in Anjaan, and there's absolutely no doubt about it. But he's let down by a weak script, terrible performances by the rest of the cast and lengthy narrative." Gautaman Bhaskaran of Hindustan Times rated one star out of five, summarizing "a more imaginative script for Suriya – like that of Kaaka Kaaka or Pithamagan could have saved the day." Ananda Vikatan rated the film 40 out of 100.

Baradwaj Rangan of The Hindu wrote, "It runs a posterior-numbing 170 minutes, and there isn’t one surprising moment — not one line of dialogue worth recalling, not one tune worth humming, not one action sequence worth upping the pulse for (they borrowed the doves from the John Woo films, but none of the moves), not one juicy character worth caring about [...] Lingusamy unleashes the technical arsenal and fractures the narrative and expects us to follow a trail of clues as if this were a twisty noir nail-biter, but it’s no use because the story has all the suspense of a housewife shopping for vegetables." S. Saraswathi of Rediff.com gave two stars out of five and wrote "Director Lingusamy's attempt to recreate Superstar's epic Baasha with good looking stars and technical brilliance fails miserably."

In contrast, Anupama Subramanian of Deccan Chronicle rated three and a half out of five, summarizing "It is high voltage revenge drama seen in umpteen numbers of films, but what makes the film work is Suriya’s stunning charisma combined with his incredible performance and glossy packaging of Lingusamy with all commercial elements including action, glam quotient, romance, friendship, humor, sentiments, vengeance in a fitting manner." Sify rated three out of five and wrote, "On the whole, Anjaan is for those who seek unabashed entertainment and relish masala films."

Rohini M. of Cinema Express rated the re-edited version of the film 2.5/5 in 2025 and said, "Overall, the film has been tightened, trimmed and rearranged to offer a fresh experience for new viewers and a noticeably different one for those who have already watched it".

=== Accolades ===
Award	Date of Ceremony (Note: Date is linked to the article about the awards held that year, wherever possible.)	Category	Recipient(s) and nominee(s)	Result	Ref.
South Indian International Movie Awards	6–7 August 2015	Best Actor in a Supporting Role – Tamil	Vidyut Jammwal	Nominated	
South Indian International Movie Awards	6–7 August 2015	Best Fight Choreographer – Tamil	Stunt Silva	Nominated	
South Indian International Movie Awards	6–7 August 2015	Best Dance Choreographer – Tamil	Raju Sundaram – ("Ek Do Theen")	Nominated	

== Controversies ==
On 18 August 2014, Central Board of Film Certification CEO Rakesh Kumar was acquitted on the accounts of taking bribery for censor certification. It was reported that Kumar had taken a laptop and iPad to issue the certificate for the film and bribed on ₹50,000 for its Telugu version.

== Internet memes ==
Due to the lackluster box office performance and dour critical reception, Anjaan inspired various internet memes. This was attributed to the film failing to live up to the fans' expectations, and the eventual disappointment after the first showing of the film. Notably, it was one of the first instances where a film was subjected to internet memes and trolls during the booming popularity of social media and meme culture in Tamil Nadu. Trade analysts and cinema enthusiasts also opined that the over-hyped promotions by the film's crew was also the main reason, and criticized the crew's decision to conduct a success meet for the teaser.

A month after the film's theatrical run, an interview by Lingusamy about the making of the film resurfaced, and several of his statements went viral on social media. A page called "Lingusamy Memes" was created by users on Facebook, trolling the director with the statements he gave in interviews. Venkat Prabhu came forward to defend Lingusamy and criticized the trolls against him, questioning the audience on not making acclaimed films successful at times.

Speaking to Srinivasa Ramanujam of The Hindu, the director admitted that overdoing the publicity of the film had caused a negative effect and also felt embarrassed that the memes against him had reached his children. Sympathizing on how it impacted the director, the administrators came up with the decision to take down the troll page or rename it.

== Financial issues ==
The film's underperformance caused Lingusamy's production house Thirrupathi Brothers to experience significant financial problems. Uttama Villain, the banner's subsequent production, was affected due to the financial issues, and its release, scheduled on 1 May 2015 was ultimately stalled due to non-payment of ₹20 crore (US$2.1 million) dues. The film released the following day after the dues were cleared. This delayed release led to a loss of ₹12 crore (US$1.2 million) and the film subsequently became a box-office bomb pushing the production house into further financial crisis.

== Remake ==
The film was remade in the Bangladeshi language as Captain Khan (2018) directed by Wajed Ali Sumon, starring Shakib Khan and Shobnom Bubly in the lead roles.
