= Shanmugarajan =

Indian actor

- Occupations: Film and theatre actor
- Years active: 2004 - present

Shanmugarajan is an Indian actor who appears in Tamil films. Shanmugarajan was born on 4th October, 1974, to father S. Muniyasamy and mother M. Rajeswari, in Ramanathapuram, Tamil Nadu, India.

== Career ==
Shanmugarajan is an alumnus of The American College in Madurai and National School of Drama. He made his debut with Virumaandi (2004) and became popular for his role as police officer named Peikkaaman. He played similar roles in Sivaji: The Boss (2007) and Thee Nagar (2007).

== Filmography ==
=== Tamil films ===
Year	Film	Role	Notes
2004	Virumaandi	Peikkaaman	
2004	Madhurey	Police inspector	
2004	Adhu	Muthu	
2004	Bose	Police inspector	
2005	Maayavi	Shanmugam	
2005	Anniyan	Chockalingam	
2005	Daas	Annachi	
2005	Sandakozhi	Durai's brother-in-law	
2006	Thambi	Saravana Pandian	
2006	Em Magan	Janani's father	
2006	Sivappathigaram		
2007	Pori	Police inspector	
2007	Sivaji	Police inspector	
2007	Thee Nagar	FIR Murthy	
2007	Marudhamalai	Shanmugarajan	
2008	Seval	Rajalingam	
2008	Kaalai	A.C.P Vallayan	
2008	Durai		
2009	Mariyadhai	Marthandam	
2009	Thoranai	Corrupt inspector	
2009	Sirithal Rasipen	Thangaraj	
2009	Vaamanan	Sivan	
2009	Mathiya Chennai		
2010	Virudhagiri		
2011	Ayyan		
2011	Thambi Vettothi Sundaram	Udumbu	
2012	Vettai	Inspector Kulasekhara Pandian	
2012	Nanda Nanditha	Politician	
2012	Krishnaveni Panjaalai		
2014	Veeram	Police Officer	
2014	Kochadaiiyaan	Devadhevan	
2014	Tenaliraman	Minister	Uncredited role
2014	Veeran Muthu Rakku		
2014	Saivam	AL.K.S.Swamigal	
2015	Sagaptham	Saga's uncle	
2015	Uttama Villain	Shanmugarajan	
2015	Eli		
2015	Maari	Velu	
2015	Thiruttu Rail		
2015	Bhooloham	Arumugam's master	
2017	Bairavaa	Advocate	
2017	Vanamagan	Police Officer	
2017	Pandigai	Police Officer	
2017	Savarikkadu	Forest ranger	
2018	Nimir	Pitchumani	
2018	Sila Samayangalil	ACP Karunakaran	
2018	Pariyerum Perumal	Pariyan's fake father	
2018	Namma Veettu Pillai	Maangani's father	
2019	Sandakozhi 2	Durai's brother-in-law	
2021	Karnan	Abhimanyu	
2021	Laabam		
2021	Thalaivii	Valampuri John	
2022	Witness	Sivaprakasam	
2024	Merry Christmas	Inspector S. Devaraj	Tamil version only
2025	Vanangaan	Joseph	

=== Other language films ===
Year	Film	Role	Language	Notes
2009	Pistha	Corrupt inspector	Telugu	
2009	Quick Gun Murugun	Gun Powder	English	
2013	Satya 2	Police officer	Telugu	

== Television ==
Year	Title	Role	Channel	Notes
2018	Nandini	Sathyanarayan	Sun TV	Replaced by Mahanadhi Shankar
2024	Aindham Vedham	'Mad' Suresh	ZEE5	
