= Vettai =

2012 film by N. Linguswamy

- Theatrical release poster
- Directed by: N. Lingusamy
- Dialogues by: Brinda Sarathy
- Screenplay by: N. Lingusamy
- Story by: N. Lingusamy
- Produced by: N. Subash Chandra Bose; Ronnie Screwvala; N. Lingusamy; Siddharth Roy Kapur
- Starring: Arya; R. Madhavan; Sameera Reddy; Amala Paul
- Cinematography: Nirav Shah
- Edited by: Anthony
- Music by: Yuvan Shankar Raja
- Production companies: Thirupathi Brothers; UTV Motion Pictures
- Distributed by: UTV Motion Pictures; Vendhar Movies
- Release date: 14 January 2012
- Running time: 168 minutes
- Country: India
- Language: Tamil

Vettai (transl. Hunt) is a 2012 Indian Tamil-language action comedy film co-produced, written and directed by N. Lingusamy. The film stars Arya and R. Madhavan in the lead roles, while Sameera Reddy, Amala Paul, Ashutosh Rana, Nassar and Thambi Ramaiah appear in supporting roles. The story follows Guru Murthy (Madhavan), a timid and peace-loving constable who lacks confidence, and his younger brother Guna (Arya), a bold, aggressive and fearless policeman. Despite being less capable in the field, Guru often gets credit for arrests, while Guna does the real work behind the scenes.

The music was composed by Yuvan Shankar Raja, and cinematography and editing handled by Nirav Shah and Anthony.

The film was announced shortly after the release of Lingusamy's Paiyaa, with Dayanidhi Alagiri's Cloud Nine Movies agreeing to produce the film, following a successful collaboration during the director's previous film. During a lengthy pre-production phase, the film underwent changes in its main cast and Cloud Nine Movies pulled out of the project. Linguswamy's own banner Thirupathi Brothers took up the film. Filming was initially planned to begin by mid-2010, but was delayed until March 2011.

Vettai was released on 14 January 2012, coinciding with Pongal festival, and became a commercial success at the box office. The film was remade in Telugu as Tadakha (2013) and in Hindi as Baaghi 3 (2020).

== Plot ==
Thirumurthy and Gurumurthy are two brothers in Thoothukudi, with Thirumurthy, being sensitive to violence, in contrast to Gurumurthy, who is brave and clever. Whenever Thirumurthy is thrashed by anyone, he sends Gurumurthy to finish them. However, Gurumurthy is frequently berated by his father Lingamurthy, a police officer, for beating local people, while Thirumurthy only feels for him.

After the death of Lingamurthy, Thirumurthy takes on the same police job by the request of Gurumurthy, who remains an unemployed youngster. Thirumurthy is posted as SI in Thoothukudi. Meanwhile, Thirumurthy and Gurumurthy meets two sisters Vasanthi and Jayanthi. Vasanthi had an issue at Gurumurthy at first, but later they broke the ice. Afterwards, Thirumurthy marries Vasanthi, and both sisters move in to Thirumurthy and Gurumurthy's house. A number of humorous incidents follow, such as Jayanthi's to-be husband is actually revealed to be a clumsy NRI named Gautham, whom she disapproves. She openly expresses her love for Gurumurthy, who accepts.

Thirumurthy rises to fame in his job by having Gurumurthy secretly punish suspects and save victims for him. Everyone believes that Thirumurthy actually fought the criminals himself, but in reality, he took credit for Gurumurthy's doings, unknown to them. One of the village's biggest mob bosses, Annachi, discovers the truth via a CCTV showing Gurumurthy. Enraged, he has his men severely beat up Thirumurthy, making the latter confident that his brother will continue his job. Gurumurthy proclaims that he made Thirumurthy as a policeman to overcome his fears and become stronger. Following his recovery, Thirumurthy begins training under Gurumurthy and subsequently overcomes his fear and manages to defeat a few of Annachi's men and tactically, with Gurumurthy's help, kill Maari, the goon responsible for beating him up.

Eventually, Annachi and his men break into the brothers's house and cause havoc. Thirumurthy and Gurumurthy arrive and defeat all of Annachi's men; however, they are unable to beat Annachi. Gurumurthy wants to kill Annachi but Thirumurthy wants to arrest him. The two brothers quarrel on whether to kill or arrest him. Gurumurthy declares that they will roll the gun; if the stops at Annachi, he will be killed. The gun stops rolling at Annachi and when he tries to grab the gun, Gurumurthy stops him by kicking him, and Thirumurthy shoots him dead.

Thirumurthy is again congratulated by the local police, but gives equal credit to Gurumurthy as well. Through this praise, Gurumurthy also gets to join the police force.

== Cast ==
- Arya as Gurumurthy, Thirumurthy's brother
- R. Madhavan as Inspector K. Thirumurthy, Gurumurthy's brother
- Sameera Reddy as Vasanthi, Thirumurthy's wife (Voice dubbed by Chinmayi)
- Amala Paul as Jayanthi, Gurumurthy's wife (Voice dubbed by Savitha Reddy)
- Ashutosh Rana as Annachi (Voice dubbed by Thalaivasal Vijay)
- Nassar as SP Veerapandiyan Thevar IPS
- Thambi Ramaiah as Constable B. Azhagu
- Kalashala Babu as Constable Thenappan
- Soundararaja as Madura
- Shanmugarajan as Inspector Kulasekara Pandian
- Sreejith Ravi as Surulai
- Nagendra Babu as Lingamurthy, Gurumurthy's and Thirumurthy's late father
- Rajeev Ravindranathan as Gautham
- Naadodigal Gopal as Police officer
- Muthukumar as Maari
- N. Linguswamy as a man smoking cigarette (cameo appearance)

== Production ==
=== Development ===
In April 2010, following the success of Paiyaa, Cloud Nine Movies, who had distributed the film, announced a successive collaboration with the film's director N. Linguswamy, who would make a romantic action film with Silambarasan in the lead role. For pre-production works, the crew of the team subsequently headed to Macau to work out the script, following which Lingusamy moved to the Orange County resort in Coorg, Karnataka to finalise the script. Later that month a photoshoot was completed, with Silambarsan sporting the get up of an NCC cadet. However, in July 2010, reports suggested that Silambarasan was dropped from the project, since he suddenly, without informing Lingusamy and Dhayanidhi, signed himself up and began working in Vaanam (2011). Silambarasan, in return, revealed that he had not officially signed Cloud Nine Pictures' film, and only decided to work on Vaanam, since Lingusamy was not able to narrate the complete script, despite making him wait for over 100 days. Controversially, Silambarasan later signed another film in September 2010, which was similarly titled as Vettai Mannan.

Eventually in September 2010, the film was official announced at a press meet with the title Vettai with Arya replacing Silambarasan. At the press meet, he revealed that he worked for over three months on the script, keeping his editor Anthony Gonsalvez and cinematographer Nirav Shah updated about the developments. The film's principal photography was supposed to commence in December 2010. It was announced as a bilingual project, to be shot separately in Tamil and Telugu. The Telugu version was supposed to be produced by Tirupati Prasad of Mega Supergood Films and feature Mahesh Babu in the lead role, with Madhavan reprising his role. In March 2011, Cloud Nine Movies stepped out of the project, which prompted Linguswamy to produce Vettai, too, under his home banner Thirupathi Brothers along with his brother Subash Chandra Bose.

=== Casting ===
After Silambarasan's exit, Vijay was expected to enact the lead role, who had earlier agreed to star in a Lingusamy film in future, and was subsequently approached by the team. He, however, declined the offer, not willing to play a role that was "originally written keeping in mind the image of another actor". Only in September 2010, during the official announcement, it became apparent that Arya was signed on to reprise the lead role. Furthermore, Linguswamy was trying to sign Madhavan for another leading role, while, several days later, sources reported that Madhavan definitely had rejected the offer. The next month, however, it was confirmed that Madhavan was roped in to enact the role as a police officer and brother of Arya's character. Madhavan accepted the film as he was 'blown' away by the story.

The lead female role was reported to be played by Tamannaah Bhatia, who had been part of Lingusamy's Paiyaa as well. In an interview later, she disclosed that she was not approached earlier and though she liked the script, she could not take the offer due to her prior commitments. Anushka Shetty then accepted the offer, while Sameera Reddy was signed to play Madhavan's pair in the film, as a village girl. In late November 2010, Anushka pulled out and Amala Paul, following her critically acclaimed performance in Mynaa, was roped in to play a leading character, as the love interest of Arya's character.

=== Filming ===
After Arya had finished shooting and dubbing for Avan Ivan, the first schedule of Vettai was planned to begin on 2 March, which however, was also cancelled as Dhayanidhi wanted the filming to be pushed by another two months, which supposedly was the reason for Linguswamy's decision to produce the film himself. Shooting eventually started on 16 March 2011 in Karaikudi, with Madhavan, Arya, Sameera Reddy and Amala Paul participating. A song "Dumma Dumma Dummaa", choreographed by Brindha, was shot first, with nearly 2000 people being part of the shoot along with the four lead actors. A fight sequence, involving Arya and Madhavan, was shot in the Pondicherry University sports complex on 24 April. In June 2011, other key action sequences were filmed at Madurai, Thoothukudi, Thanjavur and Aruppukottai. The introduction song of the film was also shot in Thanjavur. Some action sequences were shot in Madanapalle, a town located in the Chittoor district, Andhra Pradesh, while the climax was shot at Binny Mills in Chennai under the supervision of stunt director Silva in October 2011.

== Soundtrack ==
Following successful collaborations with director Linguswamy in Sandakozhi (2005) and Paiyaa (2010), Yuvan Shankar Raja was signed up to produce the film score and soundtrack for Vettai as well. The album featured five songs with lyrics written by Na. Muthukumar. The soundtrack album was launched on 16 December 2011 at the Anna Centenary Auditorium in Kotturpuram, Chennai, with several lead actors and directors from the Tamil film industry attending the event. Four days prior to the soundtrack release, on 12 December 2011, the song "Pappappa" was launched as a single track.

== Release ==
Produced on a budget of ₹ 25 crore, the filmmakers wanted to release the film on 13 January 2012, due to post production delays, the release date was postponed by a day. The movie released on the Pongal weekend on 14 January 2012. Vettai was released in 650 screens worldwide on 14 January 2012 including 300 screens in Tamil Nadu, 250 screens in the rest of India, and about a 100 screens overseas. Vettai sold 4.3 million tickets worldwide.

== Reception ==
=== Critical reception ===
Sify's critic wrote: "Lingusamy's Vettai is a racy mass entertainer with all the ingredients mixed in the right proposition. No doubt that the director understands the pulse of the common man and has beautifully packaged it with all the essential commercial elements to suit the taste of the masses". Pavithra Srinivasan of Rediff gave 2.5/5 and noted: "Vettai is no classic, but it is good fun." The Times of India wrote: "Though there is nothing new in terms of the story or screenplay, the movie is a fun ride as long as it lasts". Deccan chronicle wrote:"The first half moves fast with unlimited entertainment, while the post-interval portions falls along predicted lines and pace suffers". Hindu wrote:"The story isn't out of the ordinary, but Lingusamy knows where to place twists and how. From Run to Sandakkozhi and now to Vettai, his action ventures, with the exception of Bheema and Ji, have screenplays that sustain the interest of the viewer". Rachel Saltz of The New York Times wrote: "Vettai partakes of the something-for-everyone formula, mixing the serious — corruption, evil gangs and limb-threatening fights — with the less so: songs, romance and comedy. It entertains without breaking any new ground, though it can also surprise".

== Awards and nominations ==
Ceremony	Category	Nominee	Result
2nd South Indian International Movie Awards	Best Actor in a Supporting Role	R. Madhavan	Won
2nd South Indian International Movie Awards	Best Actor in a Negative Role	Ashutosh Rana	Nominated

== Remakes ==
The film's remake rights were sold for ₹ 3 crore, to Bellamkonda Suresh. The Telugu version, titled Tadakha, was released in 2013. and in Hindi as Baaghi 3 (2020).
