= Sandakozhi =

2005 film by N. Lingusamy

- Poster
- Directed by: N. Lingusamy
- Written by: S. Ramakrishnan (Dialogues)
- Screenplay by: N. Lingusamy
- Story by: N. Lingusamy
- Produced by: Vikram Krishna
- Starring: Vishal; Meera Jasmine; Rajkiran; Lal
- Cinematography: Jeeva; Nirav Shah
- Edited by: G. Sasikumar
- Music by: Yuvan Shankar Raja
- Production company: G K Film Corporation
- Release date: 16 December 2005
- Running time: 135 minutes
- Country: India
- Language: Tamil

Sandakozhi (transl. Fighting Rooster) is a 2005 Indian Tamil-language action drama film directed by N. Lingusamy and produced by Vikram Krishna under G K Film Corporation. The film stars Vishal, Meera Jasmine, Rajkiran, and Lal, while Raja, Suman Setty and Ganja Karuppu play supporting roles. The music was composed by Yuvan Shankar Raja, while the cinematography and editing were handled by Jeeva-Nirav Shah and G. Sasikumar respectively.

Sandakozhi was released on 16 December 2005 to positive reviews from critics and became a major success, running for over 210 days in theatres and achieving cult status. The Telugu dubbed version titled Pandem Kodi released on 19 May 2006 and was also commercially successful. The film was remade in Kannada as Vayuputra. A sequel titled Sandakozhi 2 was released in 2018, but the sequel became a flop.

== Plot ==
Balu, an engineering student studying in Chennai, visits his classmate and friend Karthik's home in Chidambaram after the final exams. Balu meets Karthik's sister Hema and they develop an affection which transforms into love. Kasi, a local gangster in Chidambaram, is feared by the entire town. On his way back to his place, Balu sees Kasi chasing a man with an aruval. When Kasi was about to kill the man, Balu interferes and stops Kasi, who gets enraged and immediately tries to attack Balu, but Balu smashes Kasi in front of everyone and leaves.

Kasi is furious and wants vengeance against Balu. Kasi's men trap Karthik/Hema's father and learn about Balu's native place. Kasi sets goons to kill Balu, but gets shocked when he learns that Balu's father is Durai, a powerful chieftain of Theni, and it will be difficult to attack them. Kasi leaves to Theni and waits for the right moment to kill Balu and his family. Balu meets Hema, Karthik and their family at a temple. Hema/Karthik's father is initially angered by seeing Balu as he was responsible to bring trouble by hitting Kasi, but Balu convinces him and both families approve Balu and Hema's relationship.

One day, Kasi tries to kill Balu, but Durai gets attacked instead. Durai understands that Balu is being targeted and decides to protect him. A localite in Theni hates Durai and his family and decides to help Kasi kill Durai. Kasi utilises the opportunity to kill Balu and Durai during a temple festival, but Balu saves Durai. Durai asks Balu to fight with Kasi, where Balu thrashes Kasi and leaves, challenging him to return if he still has guts to finish him.

== Cast ==
- Vishal as Balu
- Meera Jasmine (voice: Savitha) as Hema
- Rajkiran as Duraipandi Thevar
- Lal as Kasi
- Raja as Karthik
- Suman Shetty as Ilango
- Ganja Karuppu as Karuppu
- Thalaivasal Vijay as Durai's nemesis
- John Amirtharaj as Hema's father
- Jaya Murali as Hema's mother
- Shanmugarajan as Durai's brother-in-law
- Thennavan as Durai's brother-in-law
- Kadhal Dhandapani
- George Maryan as Lawyer
- Mu Ramaswamy as Villager
- Monica as Balu's cousin

Vidharth and Elango Kumaravel, uncredited, play Balu and Karthik's friends.

== Production ==
Sandakozhi was originally narrated for Vijay, but he declined the project without listening to the full script. Discussions with Suriya proved unsuccessful too, as Bala who was then attached as producer had a dispute with Linguswamy over his set remuneration. Vishal approached Lingusamy for the film and although Lingusamy was initially hesitant, Vishal assured him that he would be a right fit for the role right before Chellamae was to be released. Vishal worked hard for the role by taking courses in acting and dancing. A fight scene involving Vishal and Lal was picturised in Dindigul for seven days. The songs were shot at locations in Australia, New Zealand and Chennai. An introduction song for Rajkiran was shot at Theni. The song "Ennamo Nadakirathe" was shot at Mauritius for six days.

== Soundtrack ==
The soundtrack, composed by Yuvan Shankar Raja, teaming up for the first time with director N. Linguswamy and Vishal, was released on 25 November 2005. Both the film score as well as the songs were appreciated and praised as outstanding with the song "Dhavanipotta Deepavali" considered as the pick of the album. The audio launch for the Telugu dubbed version took place on 7 May 2006 at Fortune Katriya Hotel in Hyderabad.

Track listing
No.	Title	Lyrics	Singer(s)	Length
1.	"Dhavanipotta Deepavali"	Yugabharathi	Vijay Yesudas, Shreya Ghoshal	4:23
2.	"Ennamo Nadakkirathe"	Na. Muthukumar	Shaan	5:01
3.	"Gumthalakkadi Gana"	Na. Muthukumar	Karthik, Ranjith	5:03
4.	"Ketta Kodukkira Boomi"	Thamarai	Ganga Sitharasu, Jassie Gift, Sujatha Mohan, Premgi, Yuvan Shankar Raja	4:26
5.	"Mundasu Sooriyane"	Pa. Vijay	Karthik, Palakkad Sreeram	3:44
Total length:				22:37

== Reception ==
=== Critical response ===
Sify wrote "Sandakozhi is a well-packaged film without any big stars or unwanted sentiments." Malini Mannath of Chennai Online wrote "Sandakozhi is an engaging entertainer, an action-flick with a difference". Lajjavathi of Kalki wrote "Sandakozhi which came out without major stars and any unnecessary sentiments is a Jaikira Kozhi (winning rooster)." Ananda Vikatan wrote that Lingusamy's mixed taste shines in the tumultuous romance and thrilling action knots; only if the liveliness and excitement of the first half had been the same in the second half, Sandakozhi could have been given a loud whistle.

=== Box office ===
The film was a commercial success grossing $4.5 million at the box office. After the success of Sandakozhi, Vishal's father G. K. Reddy decided to dub the film in Telugu as Pandem Kodi, which was released in May 2006. The Telugu dubbed version was also successful collecting a distributors' share of ₹2.5-3 crore.

== Accolades ==
Sandakozhi won two Tamil Nadu State Film Awards: Best Male Character Artiste (Rajkiran) and Best Stunts (Kanal Kannan).

== Sequel ==
In December 2015, Linguswamy announced that he would direct the sequel of Sandakozhi with Vishal again, which was shelved. However, the project was revived in 2017 with Vishal confirming his presence in the sequel. Rajkiran from the original has been retained in the sequel, with additional new cast involving Keerthy Suresh and Varalaxmi Sarathkumar. The film was released in 2018; however, it failed to replicate the success of its original film.
