= Thirrupathi Brothers =

Indian film production company

- Type: Filmmaking
- Industry: Motion pictures
- Founded: 2006
- Founder: N. Subash Chandrabose; N. Lingusamy
- Headquarters: Chennai, TamilNadu, India
- Number of employees: 30

Thirrupathi Brothers is an Indian Tamil film production company owned by brothers N. Subash Chandrabose and N. Lingusamy and was founded in 2006.

== History ==
The first venture of Thirrupathi Brothers was Deepavali, directed by Ezhil with Jayam Ravi and Bhavana in lead roles. It was a moderate success. Then it was Pattalam, starring Nadhiya and a host of new faces.

The next venture, Paiyaa (2010) was directed by N. Lingusamy himself. The film brought together Karthi and Tamannaah Bhatia and Bollywood actor Milind Soman. It showcased a journey the lead couple undertake on the request of the heroine. The ups and downs the duo undergo during the journey and how they bond during the same forms the story.

Lingusamy's next Vettai (2012) was also produced by Thirrupathi Brothers. It starred Madhavan, Arya, Sameera Reddy and Amala Paul. It is their highest-grossing film to date.

The banner's next offering Vazhakku Enn 18/9 was critically acclaimed. The film marked the comeback of Balaji Sakthivel after a brief hiatus. Hosting a number of newbies in the lead the movie with a realistic approach takes a dig on love and so called love among today's young intertwined with a MMS crime plot. It was remade in Malayalam as Black Butterflies and Kannada as Case No.18/9.

Thirrupathi Brothers produced Kumki (2012) with Prabhu Solomon which starred Vikram Prabhu in the lead and marked his foray in Tamil cinema. Thirrupathi Brothers also produced films like Ivan Veramathiri, Goli Soda, Manja Pai and Sathuranga Vettai.

=== Financial problems ===
In 2014, Lingusamy produced Suriya-starrer Anjaan, which was directed by himself, and Kamal Haasan's Uttama Villain (2015), which was directed by Ramesh Aravind. The producer suffered losses, because of the failure of Anjaan, which affected the production of the latter. Hence, in order to overcome the losses, Thirrupathi Brothers, sold the rights of Uttama Villain and the Sivakarthikeyan-starrer Rajinimurugan (2015), to Eros International, and also borrowed money from local distributors, during the release of Uttama Villain. However, a week before its release, producer R. Thangaraj of Thangam Cinemas, filed a case to stay the release of the film, since Lingusamy had to pay an amount of ₹2 crore, to the producer. But, as per sources, the company has a deficit ₹20 crore, at the time of the release, which led to a wrangle between financiers and producers. Due to the dispute, the film which was initially slated to release on 1 May 2015, had a delayed release, leading to a loss of ₹12 crore. The film was a failure upon its release, leading to huge financial crisis for the production house.

The banner's next production Rajinimurugan, which was initially slated to release in September 2015, had a delay, because of the financial crisis, and the producer, who has to settle payment for Eros International, which ballooned the amount to ₹20 crore, after the failure of Uttama Villain. After setting disputes, the film was released in January 2016, and was a commercial success. But the financial crisis of the company, led to halt their other projects; Idam Porul Yaeval, which was directed by Seenu Ramasamy, starring Vijay Sethupathi and Vishnu Vishal, remained unreleased, and other two projects Ra Ra Rajashekhar and Naan Thaan Siva, were ultimately halted.

== Filmography ==
Year	Title	Director	Cast	Synopsis	Notes
2007	Deepavali	Ezhil	Jayam Ravi, Bhavana	A gangster who meets his lover after a long time finds out that she has lost her memory.	
2009	Pattalam	Rohan Krishna	Nadhiya, Irfan, Deepthi Nambiar	The film revolves around bunch of school student and their school life.	
2010	Paiyaa	N. Lingusamy	Karthi, Tamannaah Bhatia, Milind Soman	A boy and a girl who embarks on a road trip realizes that they are being followed by gangsters.	
2012	Vettai	N. Lingusamy	Arya, R. Madhavan, Sameera Reddy, Amala Paul	Younger brother is on a mission to make his coward elder brother into a brave guy.	
2012	Vazhakku Enn 18/9	Balaji Sakthivel	Sri, Urmila Mahanta, Mithun Murali, Manisha Yadav	The paths of a rich boy and a poor boy intersects after an unfortunate incident.	
2012	Kumki	Prabu Solomon	Vikram Prabhu, Lakshmi Menon	In order to tame a ferocious elephant Komban, Kumki elephant is brought to a village to complete the job.	
2013	Ceylon	Santosh Sivan	Karan S, Sugandha Garg, Saritha	Rajini, a Sri Lankan Tamil girl, narrates the horrific tale of why she had to leave her homeland and become a refugee in India.	
2013	Ivan Veramathiri	M. Saravanan	Vikram Prabhu, Surabhi, Vamsi Krishna, Ganesh Venkatraman	A youngster kidnaps the brother of a minister as part of injustice which he was associated with.	
2014	Goli Soda	Vijay Milton	Kishore, Sree Raam, Pandi, Murugesh	Group of young boys who lose their identity because of a loan shark teams up together to regain their lost identity.	
2014	Manja Pai	N. Ragavan	Vimal, Lakshmi Menon, Rajkiran	Old man who stays with his grandson in the city finds it difficult to adjust with the city's atmosphere.	
2014	Sathuranga Vettai	H. Vinoth	Natty Subramaniam, Ishara Nair, Ponvannan	A con man who cheats various kinds of people ends up being troubled by the same people who got cheated by him.	
2014	Anjaan	N. Lingusamy	Suriya, Samantha, Vidyut Jamwal, Manoj Bajpai	Gangster who gets betrayed by his own gang members arrives posing as his crippled younger brother to avenge the death of his friend.	
2015	Uthama Villain	Ramesh Aravind	Kamal Haasan, Pooja Kumar, Andrea Jeremiah, Parvathy	A superstar who is on the final stages of his life decides to do a historical film before his death.	
2015	Vanna Jigina	Nandha Periyasamy	Vijay Vasanth, Sanyathara	A taxi driver who is insecured about his looks befriends a girl through social media on the pretext of a good looking guy.	
2016	Rajini Murugan	Ponram	Sivakarthikeyan, Keerthi Suresh, Rajkiran, Samuthirakani	A young man fights against a money lender who claims to be the long lost grandson of his grandfather.	
2023	Beginning	Jagan Vijaya	Vinoth Kishan, Gouri G. Kishan	Two people -An autistic teenager living with his mother and A young woman abducted by an unknown group.	Distributors only
2024	Rail	Bhaskar Sakthi	Kungumaraj Muthusamy, Parvaiz Mahroo, Vairamala	In a rapidly urbanizing village, Muthiah, an electrician turned habitual drinker, struggles with his marriage and work. His hatred for North Indian workers leads to conflict with his neighbor, Sunil.	Distributors only
2024	Thiru.Manickam	Nandha Periyasamy	Samuthirakani, Ananya	Set in the backdrop of Papanasam, the story revolves around a man named Manickam who is chased by everyone around him for doing good despite facing several oppositions. Among others who is trying to survive, Manickam wants to live, thereby making his transformation from Manickam to Thiru. Manickam	Distributors only
