= N. Lingusamy =

Indian film director, film producer and screenwriter (born 1967)

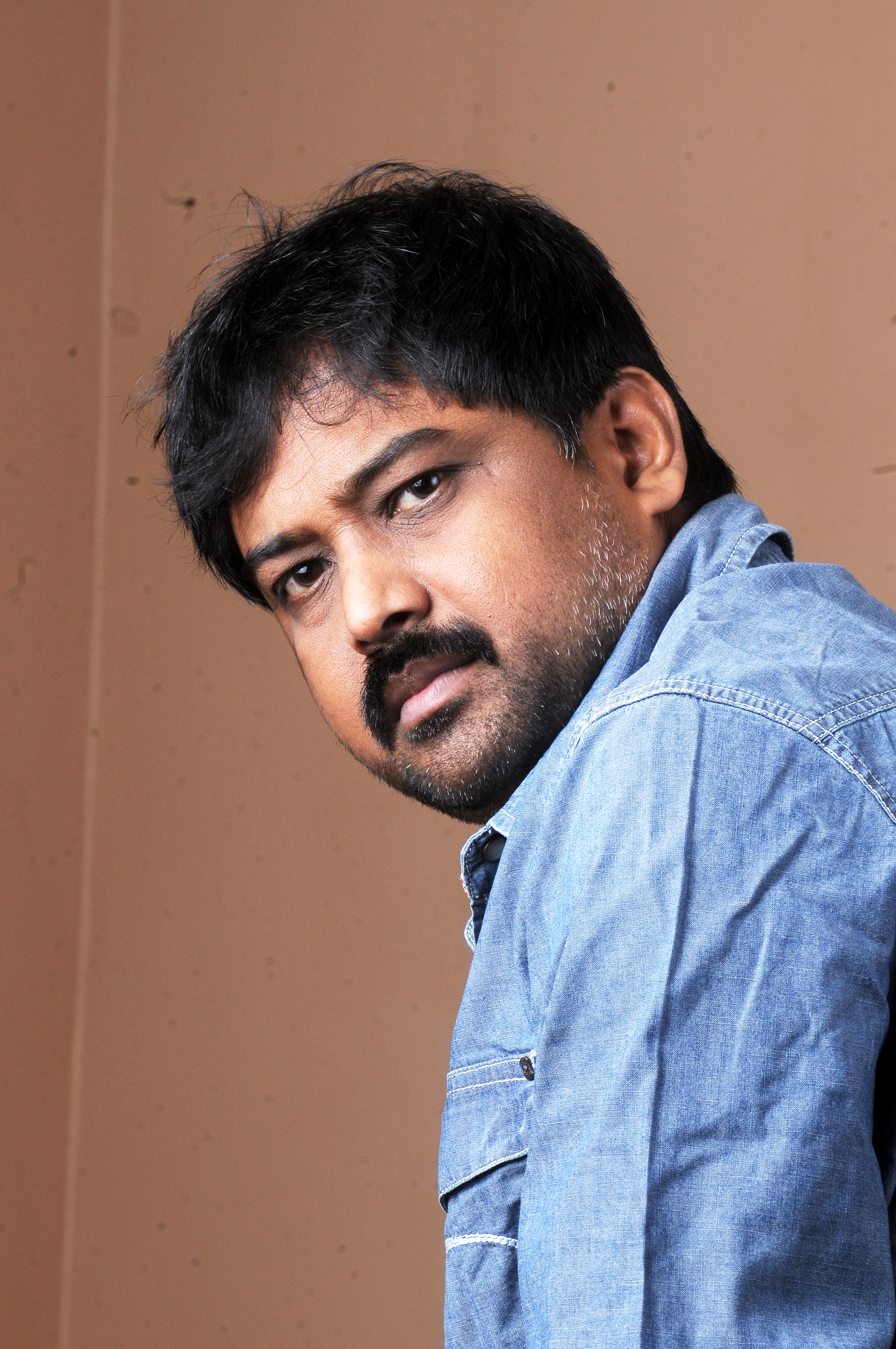
- Born: Nammalvar Lingusamy; 14 November 1967 (age 58); Kudavasal, Tamil Nadu, India
- Occupations: Film director; Film producer; Screenwriter
- Years active: 2001 – 2022
- Children: 2

Nammalvar Lingusamy (born 14 November 1967) is an Indian film director, film producer and screenwriter who works predominantly in Tamil cinema. He made his directorial debut with Aanandham (2001). He went on to direct Run (2002), Sandakozhi (2005), Paiyaa (2010) and Vettai (2012). He and his brother N. Subash Chandrabose have also produced films through his production company, Thirupathi Brothers.

== Early life ==
Lingusamy born on 14 November 1967 and hails from a town Kumbakonam, Thanjavur, Tamil Nadu. He worked as an assistant director to A. Venkatesh and Vikraman.

== Career ==
=== 2001-2005: Debut and recognition ===
Lingusamy made his directorial debut with the Tamil family drama Aanandham, starring Mammootty. About the film, Linguswamy said: "The film actually is based on real life. Born in a large family I was impressed with the incidents my mother narrated to me. They were deeply etched in my memory and I thought I would use them when I got a chance to direct a film. Thus when Mr. Choudary gave me an opportunity I narrated the stories and he found them highly appealing". Linguswamy originally wanted to title the project, Thirupathi Brothers, which he later went on to name his production house. Aanandham opened to positive reviews in May 2001, with a critic noting that "it is a promising work from the debutant director". The film won several awards including the Filmfare Award for Best Film – Tamil, Cinema Express Award for Best Film – Tamil, and two Tamil Nadu State Film Awards, while, The Hindu listed the film amongst the best of 2001.

His second film was Run with Madhavan. The film, too, was a commercially successful and also received good reviews. After the success of Run, Linguswamy announced his plans of re-collaborating with Madhavan in Sathyam, a film about student politics. Owing to Madhavan's unavailability, the role went to Ajith Kumar, with the film being newly re-titled Ji. Upon release the film received positive reviews especially a critic from Indiaglitz praising the film citing that "Lingusamy should be appreciated for giving a movie with pulsating sequences. He has infused the script with all the right ingredients and keeps the tempo of the narration on an even keel." Critics from The Hindu claimed that the film "could have been better". Similarly the film received a negative review from Rediff.com's critics citing that "Ji is for Ajith fans only!". The film took a large opening all over Tamil Nadu, but later turned out to be a box office failure and sustained a considerable loss for the producer.

His next project was Sandakozhi with Vishal in his second film. The film was a commercial success grossing $3.5 million at the box office. A critic from Sify in his review wrote: "Lingusamy lives up to his reputation as a director who makes racy action packed family entertainers with his new release Sandakozhi." In 2005, Vikram signed his next project Bheemaa, which faced severe delays and only released in January 2008. Upon release, the film gained mixed reviews though reviewers praised Vikram's performance with a critic claiming to see the film "only for him". Similarly the review from The Hindu was critical of the excessive violence and mentioned that "as narration gives way after a point, Vikram can only appear helpless". Noted director Gautham Vasudev Menon criticized the film in a leading newspaper.

=== 2008-2012: Continued success ===
In 2008, Lingusamy began filming his sixth project, Paiyaa featuring Karthi and Tamannaah in the lead roles. Upon release the film and its soundtrack by Yuvan Shankar Raja were successful and received generally positive reviews, with most critics calling the film "summer entertainer" and lauding its technical aspects. Sify described the film as a "road movie laced with mass elements and extraordinary songs", adding that it is a "jolly good ride" and naming it "technically [...] Linguswamy's his best". A reviewer from the Times of India, Bhama Devi Ravi, gave the film 3 out of 5 stars, writing that "the story is not earth-shatteringly new, but what pulls you into the movie is the different spin that Lingusamy gives to the familiar story".

Lingusamy's next made the action masala film Vettai with Arya and Madhavan in lead roles. Vettai released on the Pongal weekend on 14 January 2012, and received overall mixed to positive reviews as well.

Although Lingusamy has mainly worked in Tamil, his films have been dubbed or been remade in other languages. Dubbed Telugu versions of Run, Sandakozhi and Paiyaa, titled Run, Pandem Kodi and Awara, respectively, were released in Andhra Pradesh and also became commercially successful. Aanandham was remade in 2005 as Sankranti by Muppalaneni Shiva in Telugu, while Jeeva remade Run in Hindi under the same title in 2004.

=== 2014-2022: Career decline ===
In 2014, Lingusamy's Anjaan was released, starring Suriya and Samantha. The film turned out to be a disaster. Critics lashed at the lack of content with some labelling it as a "Kaatu Kuppa". Part of the reason for the film's box office result was due to the hype generated by the film crew pre release which it subsequently could not satisfy and also became the basis of memes generated on social media.

Lingusamy later directed Sandakozhi 2 (2018), a sequel to Sandakozhi, having Vishal reprising his role. The film could not repeat the success of the original. He directed the bilingual Telugu-Tamil film The Warriorr (2022), which marked his Telugu debut. It received negative reviews from critics and was a box office bomb.

== Filmography ==
- Note: all films are in Tamil, unless otherwise noted.

| Year | Title | Credited as | | | Notes |
| Year | Title | Director | Writer | Producer | Notes |
|---|---|---|---|---|---|
| 2001 | Aanandham | Yes | Yes | No | Cinema Express Award for Best Film – Tamil; Tamil Nadu State Film Award for Best Film (Third Prize) |
| 2002 | Run | Yes | Yes | No | |
| 2005 | Ji | Yes | Yes | No | |
| 2005 | Sandakozhi | Yes | Yes | No | |
| 2008 | Bheemaa | Yes | Yes | No | |
| 2010 | Paiyaa | Yes | Yes | Yes | Nominated, Vijay Award for Favourite Director |
| 2012 | Vettai | Yes | Yes | Yes | Cameo appearance |
| 2014 | Anjaan | Yes | Yes | Yes | |
| 2018 | Sandakozhi 2 | Yes | Yes | No | |
| 2022 | The Warriorr | Yes | Yes | No | Shot simultaneously in Telugu; Telugu film debut |
