= List of Tamil films of 2025 =

This is a list of Tamil language films produced in the Tamil cinema in India that were released in 2025.

== Box office collection ==
The following is the list of highest-grossing Tamil films released in 2025. The rank of the films in the following table depends on the estimate of worldwide collections as reported by organizations classified as green by Wikipedia.The total collections of all movies is 1,519 crores (Note: See WP:RSP, WP:ICTFSOURCES) There is no official tracking of domestic box office figures within India.

Background shading indicates that a film is currently showing in theatres worldwide.

#	Implies that the film is multilingual and the gross collection figure includes the worldwide collection of the other simultaneously filmed version.

The highest worldwide gross of 2025
Rank	Title	Production company	Worldwide gross	Ref.
1	Coolie	Sun Pictures	₹504–515 crore	(Note: Coolie's reported worldwide grosses vary between ₹514 crore (The Hans India; Filmfare; Network18 Group) – ₹515 crore (OTTPlay) – ₹675 crore (The Indian Express; Zee News))
2	Mahavatar Narsimha (Note: The film has lip-sync in Tamil, Telugu, Hindi and Kannada languages, as stated by the makers, and the CBFC certificates also indicate that these are not dubbed versions.)	Kleem Productions	₹300–325 crore #	(Note: retro's reported worldwide grosses vary between ₹250 crore (Hindustan Times, Cinema Express, News18) – ₹325 crore (DNA India, The Economic Times))
3	Good Bad Ugly	Mythri Movie Makers	₹200–248.25 crore	(Note: Good Bad Ugly's reported worldwide grosses vary between ₹200 crore (Filmfare) – ₹240 crore (Deccan Chronicle) – ₹248.25 crore (The Economic Times, Hindustan Times))
4	Dragon	AGS Entertainment	₹150 crore	
5	Kuberaa (Note: The film was produced in both the Telugu and Tamil languages)	Sree Venkateswara Cinemas LLP; Amigos Creations	₹115–132 crore #	(Note: Kuberaa's reported worldwide grosses vary between ₹115 crore (Hindustan Times) – ₹132 crore (The Hans India; News18))
6	Dude	Mythri Movie Makers	₹100–113.25 crore	
7	Tourist Family	Million Dollar Studios; MRP Entertainment	₹90 crore	
8	Retro	Stone Bench Films, 2D Entertainment	₹85–95 crore	(Note: Retro's reported worldwide grosses vary between ₹80 crore (The New Indian Express) – ₹110 crore (Indiatimes) – ₹250 crore (News7 Tamil))
9	Vidaamuyarchi	Lyca Productions	₹80−85 crore	(Note: Vidaamuyarchi's reported worldwide grosses vary between ₹135.65 crore (The Economic Times) – 138 crore (Hindustan Times; Business Today))
10	Thug Life	Raaj Kamal Films International; Madras Talkies; Red Giant Movies	₹97 crore	

== January–March ==
Opening		Title	Director	Cast	Production company	Ref.
J A N U A R Y	3	Bioscope	Sankagiri Rajkumar	Sankagiri Rajkumar, Manickam, Vellayammal, Muththayi	25 Dots Creations	
J A N U A R Y	3	Kalan	Veera Murugan	Deepa Shankar, Appukutty, Sampath Ram	Ramalakshmi Productions	
J A N U A R Y	3	Lara	Manimoorthi	Ashok Kumar Balakrishnan, Anushree, Venmathi, Varshini	MK Film Media Works	
J A N U A R Y	3	Seesaw	Guna Subramaniam	Natty Subramaniam, Nishanth Russo, Padine Kumar, Nizhalgal Ravi	20th Century Fox, Vidiyal Studios	
J A N U A R Y	3	Sithariya Pakkangal	Bhoopendra Raja			
J A N U A R Y	3	Xtreme	Rajavel Krishna	Rachitha Mahalakshmi, Abi Nakshathra, Amritha Halder, Ananth Nag	Sieger Pictures	
J A N U A R Y	10	Madraskaaran	Vaali Mohan Das	Shane Nigam, Kalaiyarasan, Niharika Konidela, Aishwarya Dutta	SR Productions	
J A N U A R Y	10	Vanangaan	Bala	Arun Vijay, Roshni Prakash, Samuthirakani, Mysskin	B Studios, V House Productions	
J A N U A R Y	12	Madha Gaja Raja	Sundar C.	Vishal, Santhanam, Anjali, Varalaxmi Sarathkumar	Gemini Film Circuit	
J A N U A R Y	14	Kadhalikka Neramillai	Kiruthiga Udhayanidhi	Ravi Mohan, Nithya Menen, Yogi Babu, Vinay Rai	Red Giant Movies	
J A N U A R Y	14	Nesippaya	Vishnuvardhan	Akash Murali, Aditi Shankar, R. Sarathkumar, Prabhu	XB Film Creators	
J A N U A R Y	14	Tharunam	Arvindh Srinivasan	Kishen Das, Smruthi Venkat, Raj Ayyappa, Bala Saravanan	Zhen Studios, Arka Entertainments	
J A N U A R Y	24	Kudumbasthan	Rajeshwar Kalisamy	K. Manikandan, Saanve Megghana, Guru Somasundaram, R. Sundarrajan	Cinemaakaran	
J A N U A R Y	24	Kuzhanthaigal Munnetra Kazhagam	Shankar Dayal	Yogi Babu, Senthil, Lizzie Antony, Saravanan	Meenakshi Amman Movies	
J A N U A R Y	24	Mr. Housekeeping	Arun Ravichandran	Hari Bhaskar, Losliya Mariyanesan, Shah Ra, Ilavarasu	Paramount Pictures, Sri Thenandal Films, Invate Media	
J A N U A R Y	24	Poorveegam	G Krishnan	Bose Venkat, Ilavarasu, Sriranjani, Suzane George		
J A N U A R Y	24	Vallan	VR Mani Seiyon	Sundar C, Tanya Hope, Hebah Patel, Abhirami Venkatachalam	VR Della Film Factory	
J A N U A R Y	31	Rajabheema	Naresh Sampath	Arav, Ashima Narwal, Oviya, Yashika Aannand	Surabi Films	
J A N U A R Y	31	Ring Ring	Shakthivel	Praveen Raj, Vivek Prasanna, Sakshi Agarwal, Daniel Annie Pope	Diya Cine Creations, Rule Breakers Productions	
J A N U A R Y	31	Tharuthala	Ramasubbu	Vaishali Pala	Anga Productions	
F E B R U A R Y	6	Vidaamuyarchi	Magizh Thirumeni	Ajith Kumar, Arjun, Trisha Krishnan, Arav	Lyca Productions	
F E B R U A R Y	14	2K Love Story	Suseenthiran	Jagaveer, Meenakshi Govindarajan, Bala Saravanan, Antony Bhagyaraj	City Light Pictures	
F E B R U A R Y	14	9AM To 9PM Valentines Day	M.Gowri Shankar	Ramesh Khanna, Aishwariyaa Bhaskaran		
F E B R U A R Y	14	Athu Vaangina Ethu Elavasam	SK. Senthil Rajan	Ramar, Pooja Sri, Kalaiyarasan Kannusamy, Supergood Subramani	Sreeja Cinema	
F E B R U A R Y	14	Kaadhal Enbadhu Podhu Udamai	Jayaprakash Radhakrishnan	Vineeth, Rohini, Lijomol Jose, Anusha Prabhu	Mankind Cinemas, Symmetry Cinemas, Nith's Productions	
F E B R U A R Y	14	Baby and Baby	Prathap	Jai, Sathyaraj, Yogi Babu, Pragya Nagra	Yuvaraj Films	
F E B R U A R Y	14	Dinasari	G. Sankar	Srikanth, Cynthia Lourde, Radha Ravi, Chaams	Cynthia Production House	
F E B R U A R Y	14	Fire	JSK.Satish Kumar	Balaji Murugadoss, Chandini Tamilarasan, Rachitha Mahalakshmi, Sakshi Agarwal	JSK Film Corporation	
F E B R U A R Y	14	Kanneera	Kathir Raven S	Kathir Raven S, Chandhine Kaur, Maya Glammy, Nanthakumar NKR	Uthraa Productions	
F E B R U A R Y	14	Otha Votu Muthaiya	Sai Rajagopal	Goundamani, Yogi Babu, Ravi Mariya, Rajendran	Cine Craft Productions, Kutti Story Pictures	
F E B R U A R Y	21	Dragon	Ashwath Marimuthu	Pradeep Ranganathan, Anupama Parameswaran, Kayadu Lohar, Mysskin	AGS Entertainment	
F E B R U A R Y	21	Nilavuku En Mel Ennadi Kobam	Dhanush	Pavish, Anikha Surendran, Priya Prakash Varrier, Mathew Thomas	Wunderbar Films, RK Productions	
F E B R U A R Y	21	Piranthanaal Vazhthukal	Raju Chandra	Appukutty, Aishwarya Anilkumar, Sreeja Ravi, Roji Mathew	Plan 3 Studios, Mathens Group	
F E B R U A R Y	28	Aghathiyaa	Pa. Vijay	Jiiva, Arjun Sarja, Raashii Khanna, Edward Sonnenblick	Vels Film International, Wam India	
F E B R U A R Y	28	Kadaisi Thotta	Navinkumar	Radha Ravi, Sreekumar Ganesh, Vanitha Vijayakumar, Yazar	RVR Studios	
F E B R U A R Y	28	Kooran	Nithin Vemupati	S.A. Chandrasekhar, Y.G. Mahendran, Balaji Sakthivel, Sathyan	Kanaa Productions	
F E B R U A R Y	28	Pallavapuram Manai Enn 666	Rishi S	Krishna, Eden Kuriakose, Rekha Suresh, Sunil	Ashtalakshmi Movie Makers	
F E B R U A R Y	28	Sabdham	Arivazhagan	Aadhi Pinisetty, Lakshmi Menon, Simran, Laila	7G Films, AAlpha Frames	
M A R C H	7	Badava	KV Nandha	Vimal, Soori, Shrita Rao, KGF Ram	J Studio International	
M A R C H	7	Gentlewoman	Joshua Sethuraman	Lijomol Jose, Losliya Mariyanesan, Hari Krishnan, Rajiv Gandhi	Komala Hari Pictures, One Drop Ocean Pictures	
M A R C H	7	Kingston	Kamal Prakash	G. V. Prakash Kumar, Divyabharathi, Chetan, Azhagam Perumal	Parallel Universe Pictures, Zee Studios	
M A R C H	7	Leg Piece	Srinath	Yogi Babu, Shubhangi Jha, Karunakaran, Ramesh Thilak	Hero Cinemas	
M A R C H	7	Murmur	Hemnath Narayanan	Richie Kapoor, Devaraj Arumugam, Suganya Shanmugam, Yuvikha Rajendran	SPK Pictures	
M A R C H	7	Niram Marum Ulagil	Britto JB	Bharathiraja, Natty Subramaniam, Rio Raj, Sandy	Signature Productionz, GS Cinema International	
M A R C H	7	Yamakaathaghi	Peppin George Jayaseelan	Roopa Koduvayur, Narendra Prasath, Geetha Kailasam, Raju Rajappan	Naisat Media Works, Arunasree Entertainments	
M A R C H	14	Dexter	Suryan G	Rajeev Govinda Pillai, Abishek Joseph George, Yukta Pervi, Sithara Vijayan	Ram Entertainerss	
M A R C H	14	Konjam Kadhal Konjam Modhal	K. Rangaraj	Srikanth, Pujita Ponnada, Chaams, Delhi Ganesh	Sri Ganapathi Films	
M A R C H	14	Kuttram Kurai	Satheesh K Sekar, Vijaythirumoolam	Sri Mathi	Kalabhairava Movies, SKS Movies	
M A R C H	14	Maadan Kodai Vizha	R. Thangapandi	Gokul Gowtham, Sharumiishaa, Suria Narayanan, Supergood Subramani	Deiva Productions	
M A R C H	14	Perusu	Ilango Ram	Vaibhav, Sunil Reddy, Niharika NM, Chandini Tamilarasan	Stone Bench Films, Baweja Studios, Ember Light Studios	
M A R C H	14	Robber	SM Pandi	Sathya, Daniel Annie Pope, Deepa Shankar, Sendrayan	Impress Films Productions, Metro Productions	
M A R C H	14	Sweetheart!	Swineeth S Sukumar	Rio Raj, Gopika Ramesh, Renji Panicker, Redin Kingsley	YSR Films	
M A R C H	14	Varunan	Jaayavelmurugun	Dushyanth Jayaprakash, Gabriella Charlton, Radha Ravi, Charan Raj	Yakkai Films, Vaan Productions	
M A R C H	21	Asthram	Aravind Rajagopal	Shaam, Niranjani, Nizhalgal Ravi, Aroul D Shankar	Best Movies	
M A R C H	21	Enai Sudum Pani	Ram Sevaa	Nataraj Sundarraj, Upasana RC, K. Bhagyaraj, Singampuli	SNS Pictures	
M A R C H	21	Pei Kottu	S. Lavanya	S. Lavanya, Deepa Shankar, Sreeja Ravi, Shanthi Anandaraj	Om Sai Productions	
M A R C H	21	Trauma	Thambithurai Mariyappan	Vivek Prasanna, Prathosh, Poornima Ravi, Chandini Tamilarasan	Turm Production House	
M A R C H	27	Veera Dheera Sooran: Part 2	S. U. Arun Kumar	Vikram, Dushara Vijayan, S. J. Suryah, Suraj Venjaramoodu	HR Pictures	
M A R C H	28	Aram Sei	Balu S Vaithiyanathan	Anjena Kirti, Balu S Vaithiyanathan	Thaaragai Cinemas	
M A R C H	28	The Door	Jaiiddev	Bhavana, Ganesh Venkatraman, Jayaprakash, Shivaranjani	June Dreams Studios	

== April–June ==
Opening		Title	Director	Cast	Production company	Ref.
A P R I L	4	EMI	Sadasivam Chinnaraj	Sadasivam Chinnaraj, Sai Dhanya, Black Pandi, Aadhavan	Sabari Productions	
A P R I L	4	Ka.Mu - Ka.Pi	Pushpanathan Arumugam	Vignesh Ravi, TSK, Saranya Ravichandran, Priya Dharshini	Flying Elephants Entertainment	
A P R I L	4	S/O Kaalingarayan	Baarathemogan	Anand Babu, Chandranswamy, Saran Shanmugam, Ramesh Kamal	Sun Shine Studios	
A P R I L	4	Test	S. Sashikanth	R. Madhavan, Siddharth, Nayanthara, Meera Jasmine	YNOT Studios	
A P R I L	4	Tharaipadai	Ram Prabha	Prajin Padmanabhan, Lollu Sabha Jeeva, Vijay Vishwa, Aarthi Shalini	Stonex	
A P R I L	10	Good Bad Ugly	Adhik Ravichandran	Ajith Kumar, Trisha Krishnan, Arjun Das, Sunil	Mythri Movie Makers, T-Series Films	
A P R I L	18	Naangal	Avinash Prakash	Abdul Rafe, Mithun Vasudevan, Rithik Mohanraj, Nithin Dineshkumar	Kala Bhavashri Creations	
A P R I L	18	Ten Hours	Ilayaraja Kaliyaperumal	Sibi Sathyaraj, Gajaraj, Dileepan, Jeeva Ravi	Duvin Studios	
A P R I L	24	Gangers	Sundar C	Sundar C, Vadivelu, Catherine Tresa, Bagavathi Perumal	Avni Cinemax, Benzz Media Pvt Ltd	
A P R I L	25	Sumo	S. P. Hosimin	Shiva, Priya Anand, Yoshinori Tashiro, Yogi Babu	Vels Film International	
A P R I L	25	Vallamai	Karuppaiyaa Murugan	Premgi Amaren, Dhivadarshini, Deepa Shankar, Valakku en Muthuraman	Battlers Cinema	
A P R I L	25	Vanganna Vanakkanganna	Raj Kannayiram	Senthil, Sundar Mahasri, Abinaya Sri, Sandhiya Balasubramanian	Rock and Role Production	
M A Y	1	Retro	Karthik Subbaraj	Suriya, Pooja Hegde, Jayaram, Joju George	Stone Bench Films, 2D Entertainment	
M A Y	1	Tourist Family	Abishan Jeevinth	M. Sasikumar, Simran, Yogi Babu, Mithun Jai Sankar	Million Dollar Studios, MRP Entertainment	
M A Y	9	Ambi	Bosser J Elvin	Robo Shankar, Ashwini Chandrashekar, Ramesh Khanna, Imman Annachi	T2 Media	
M A Y	9	En Kadhale	Jayalakshmi	Lingesh, Liya, Divya, Katpadi Rajan	Sky Wanders Entertainment	
M A Y	9	Gajaana	Prabadish Samz	Vedhika, Inigo Prabhakaran, Yogi Babu, Chandini Tamilarasan	Four Square Studios	
M A Y	9	Kaliyugam (Note: The film was produced in both the Tamil and Telugu languages)	Pramodh Sundar	Shraddha Srinath, Kishore, Iniyan Subramani, Asmal	RK International, Prime Cinemas	
M A Y	9	Keeno	R. K. Divakar	Mahaathaaraa Bagavath, Renuka Sadesh, Rajesh Gopishetty, Siva Sukanth	Ghantharvaa Celluloid Creators	
M A Y	9	Nizharkudai	Shiva Arumugam	Devayani, Vijjith, Kanmani Manoharan, Raj Kapoor	Dharshan Films	
M A Y	9	Yaaman	K. S. Manikandan	Gayatri Rema, Sakthi Sivan, Aadesh Bala	K. S. M. Screenplay Films	
M A Y	9	Yaman Kattalai	S. Rajasekar	Anbu Mayilasamy, Chandrika Revathi, Charle, R. Sundarrajan	Shellammal Movie Makers	
M A Y	16	Devil's Double Next Level	S. Prem Anand	Santhanam, Gautham Vasudev Menon, Selvaraghavan, Geethika Tiwary	The Show People, Niharika Entertainment	
M A Y	16	Jora Kaiya Thattunga	Vineesh Millennium	Yogi Babu, Shanthi Rao, Hareesh Peradi, Kalki Raja	Wama Entertainment	
M A Y	16	Maaman	Prasanth Pandiyaraj	Soori, Aishwarya Lekshmi, Raj Kiran, Swasika	Lark Studios	
M A Y	16	Eleven	Lokkesh Ajls	Naveen Chandra, Reyaa Hari, Dileepan, Shashank	AR Entertainment	
M A Y	23	Aagakadavana	Adhithya Dharma	Aathiran Suresh, Vincent S, CR Rahul, Micheal S	Sarah Kalaikoodam	
M A Y	23	Ace	Aarumuga Kumar	Vijay Sethupathi, Rukmini Vasanth, Yogi Babu, P. S. Avinash	7Cs Entertainment	
M A Y	23	Akamozhi Vizhikal	Dasendra K Sankar	Aadham Hasan, Neha Rathnakaran, Dharmajan Bolgatty, Pashanam Shaji	Sachu's Creations	
M A Y	23	Myyal	APG. Elumalai	Sethu Mynaa, Samriddhi Tara, P. L. Thenappan, Supergood Subramani	Icon Cine Creations	
M A Y	23	School	RK Vidyadharan	Yogi Babu, K. S. Ravikumar, Bhumika Chawla, Nizhalgal Ravi	Quantum Film Factory	
M A Y	23	Tiruppur Kuruvi				
M A Y	23	Vembu	V Justin Babu	Hari Krishnan, Sheela Rajkumar, Karnan Janaki	Manjal Cinemas	
M A Y	30	Aandavan	V. Villithirukanna	K. Bhagyaraj, Ganja Karuppu, Mahesh, Vaishnavi	William Brothers Productions	
M A Y	30	Jinn - The Pet	T.R. Bala	Mugen Rao, Bhavya Trikha, Bala Saravanan, Imman Annachi	Fairy Tale Pictures banner, AR Touring Talkies	
M A Y	30	Manidhargal	Raam Indra	Kapil Velavan, Dasha, Arjun Dev Saravanan, Gunavanthan	Studio Moving Turtle	
M A Y	30	Rajaputhiran	Mahaa Kandhan	Vetri, Prabhu, Krishna Priya, Mansoor Ali Khan	Crescent Cine Creations	
M A Y	30	The Verdict	Krishna Sankar	Suhasini Maniratnam, Varalaxmi Sarathkumar, Sruthi Hariharan, Vidyullekha Raman	Agni Entertainment	
J U N E	5	Peranbum Perungobamum	Siva Prakash	Vijith Bachan, Shali Nivekas, Mime Gopi, Subatra Robert	E5 Entertainment	
J U N E	5	Thug Life	Mani Ratnam	Kamal Haasan, Silambarasan, Trisha Krishnan, Abhirami	Raaj Kamal Films International, Madras Talkies, Red Giant Movies	
J U N E	6	Madras Matinee	Karthikeyan Mani	Kaali Venkat, Roshini Haripriyan, Shelly Kishore, Vishva	Madras Motion Pictures	
J U N E	6	Paramasivan Fathima	Esakki Karvannan	Vimal, Chayadevi, M. S. Bhaskar, Manoj Kumar	Lakshmi Creations	
J U N E	13	Guts	Rangaraj	Rangaraj, Delhi Ganesh, Shruthi Narayanan, Sai Dheena	OPRP Productions	
J U N E	13	Holocaust	Vishnu Chandran	Jayakrishnan N. , Charmila, Nandhan Unni, Thanvi Vinod	Shutter Frames Productions	
J U N E	13	Padai Thalaivan	U. Anbu	Shanmuga Pandian, Kashthuri Raja, Yamini Chander	VJ Combines	
J U N E	20	Chennai City Gangsters	Vikram Rajeshwar, Arun Keshav	Vaibhav, Athulya Ravi, Manikandan Rajesh, Anandaraj	BTG Universal	
J U N E	20	DNA	Nelson Venkatesan	Atharvaa, Nimisha Sajayan, Balaji Sakthivel, Ramesh Thilak	Olympia Movies	
J U N E	20	Kuberaa	Sekhar Kammula	Dhanush, Nagarjuna, Rashmika Mandanna, Jim Sarbh	Sree Venkateswara Cinemas LLP, Amigos Creations	
J U N E	27	Good Day	N. Aravindhan	Prithiviraj Ramalingam, Myna Nandhini, Kaali Venkat, Bagavathi Perumal	New Monk Pictures	
J U N E	27	Love Marriage	Shanmuga Priyan	Vikram Prabhu, Sushmitha Bhat, Meenakshi Dinesh, Aruldoss	Assure Films, Rise East Entertainment	
J U N E	27	Maargan	Leo John Paul	Vijay Antony, Ajay Dhishan, P. Samuthirakani, Mahanadi Shankar	Vijay Antony Film Corporation	
J U N E	27	Thirukkural	A. J. Balakrishnan	Kalai Cholan, Dhana Lakshmi, Guna Babu, Padine Kumar	Ramana Communications	

== July–September ==
Opening		Title	Director	Cast	Production company	Ref.
J U L Y	4	3BHK	Sri Ganesh	Siddharth, R. Sarathkumar, Devayani, Meetha Raghunath	Shanthi Talkies	
J U L Y	4	Akkenam	Uday K	Keerthi Pandian, Arun Pandian, Adithya Shivpink, Ramesh Thilak	A & P Groups	
J U L Y	4	Anugrahan	Sundar Krish	S. Vijay Krishna, Murali Radhakrishnan, Shruthi Ramakrishnan, Deepa Umapathy	Sakti Ciinee Productions	
J U L Y	4	Kuyili	P. Murugasamy	Lizzie Antony, Thashmiga Lakshman, Pudhupettai Suresh, Hello Kanthasamy	Bm Film International	
J U L Y	4	Paranthu Po	Ram	Shiva, Anjali, Mithul Ryan, Grace Antony	Seven Seas and Seven Hills Productions, Disney+ Hotstar	
J U L Y	4	Phoenix	Anal Arasu	Surya Vijay Sethupathi, Abhinakshathra, Varsha, J. Vignesh	AK Braveman Pictures	
J U L Y	11	Desingu Raja 2	S. Ezhil	Vimal, Jana Nathan, Pujita Ponnada, Harshitha	Infinity Creations	
J U L Y	11	Maayakoothu	AR Raghavendra	Nagarajan, Delhi Ganesh, M Ramasamy, Sai Dheena	Rahul Movie Makers, Abhimanyu Creations	
J U L Y	11	Mrs & Mr	Vanitha Vijayakumar	Vanitha Vijayakumar, Robert, Shakeela, Aarthi Ganeshkar	Vanitha Film Productions	
J U L Y	11	Oho Enthan Baby	Krishnakumar Ramakumar	Rudra, Mithila Palkar, Anju Kurian, Mysskin	Vishnu Vishal Studioz, Romeo Pictures, Good Show	
J U L Y	11	Thotram	A. Tamil Selvan	Ela Bharath, R. Vasundhara, Saravanan, Thirupachi Benjamin	Elango Cini Creations	
J U L Y	18	Aakkiramippu	Vhanya	Azhagu Prakash, Suganya, Deepa Shankar	V1 Cinemaas	
J U L Y	18	Bun Butter Jam	Raghav Mirdath	Raju Jeyamohan, Aadhya Prasad, Bhavya Trikha, Saranya Ponvannan	Rain of Arrows Entertainment	
J U L Y	18	Central	Bharathi Sivalingam	J. Vignesh, Soneshwari Sivasenthilnathan, Perarasu, R. Dharshan	Sri Ranganathar Movie Makers	
J U L Y	18	Gevi	Tamil Dhayalan	Sheela Rajkumar, Jacquline Lydia, Aadhavan, Charles Vinoth	Artup Triangles Film Kampany	
J U L Y	18	Iravu Paravai	Vethaji Pandian	Nandhini Udayakumar, Jai, Nizhalgal Ravi, Raghavi Rajkumar		
J U L Y	18	Jenma Natchathiram	B. Manivarman	Taman Akshaan, Malvi Malhotra, Maithreya, Raksha Cherin	Amoham Studios, Whitelamp Pictures	
J U L Y	18	Trending	Sivaraj N	Kalaiyarasan, Priyalaya, Prem Kumar, Besant Ravi	Ram Film Factory	
J U L Y	18	Yaadhum Ariyaan	M. Gopi	Appukutty, Thambi Ramaiah, Dinesh, Brana Abdulsalam	Breaking Point Pictures	
J U L Y	25	2K Heart	J. Santhosh Kumar	Srinivasan, Chaplin Balu, Lingesh Kumar, Karthick Raja	Sri Sivakudumbam Films	
J U L Y	25	Maareesan	Sudheesh Sankar	Vadivelu, Fahadh Faasil, Kovai Sarala, Vivek Prasanna	Super Good Films	
J U L Y	25	Mahavatar Narsimha	Ashwin Kumar	Animated characters	Kleem Productions; Hombale Films	
J U L Y	25	Thalaivan Thalaivii	Pandiraaj	Vijay Sethupathi, Nithya Menen, Yogi Babu, Chemban Vinod Jose	Sathya Jyothi Films	
A U G U S T	1	Accused	Prabhu Srinivas	Udhaya, Yogi Babu, Ajmal Ameer, Jhanvika Kalakeri	Jaeshan Studios	
A U G U S T	1	Bhoghee	Vijayasekaran S	Nabi Nanthi, Swasika, Poonam Kaur, Rajendran	Vi Cinema Global Networks, LIKE	
A U G U S T	1	House Mates	T. Raja Vel	Darshan, Aarsha Chandini Baiju, Kaali Venkat, Vinodhini	Playsmith Studios, South Studios, SK Productions	
A U G U S T	1	Mr Zoo Keeper	J. Suresh	Pugazh, Shirin Kanchwala, Singampuli, Imman Annachi	J4 Studios	
A U G U S T	1	Muthal Pakkam	Anish Ashraf	Vetri, Shilpa Manjunath, Thambi Ramaiah, Redin Kingsley	Sinnathamby Production	
A U G U S T	1	Surrender	Gowthaman Ganapathy	Tharshan, Lal, Sujith Shankar, Munishkanth	Upbeat Pictures	
A U G U S T	1	Usurae	Naveen D Gopal	Teejay Arunasalam, Janany Kunaseelan, Manthra, Thangadurai	Shree Krishna Productions, Bakialakshmi Talkies	
A U G U S T	8	Kathuvaakula Oru Kadhal	Maass Ravi	Maass Ravi, Lakshmi Priya, Manjula Raj, Sai Dheena	Chennai Productions	
A U G U S T	8	Maamaram	Jai Akash	Jai Akash, Nidhi Subbaiah, Brahmanandam, Rahul Dev	Jai Akash Films	
A U G U S T	8	Maheshwaran Magimai	Thavamani	Sree Chezhian, Swaminathan	Uvari Shri Brammasakthi Ammal Thiraipada Thayarippu Niruvanam	
A U G U S T	8	Naalai Namadhe	K. Venbha Kathiresan	B. Madhumitha, N. Velmurugan, Raja Lingam, Parotta Murugesan	Sree Durga Creations	
A U G U S T	8	Raagu Kethu	Durai Balasundaram	P. Samuthirakani, Kasthuri Shankar, Archana Kanthan, Sandhya Sree	Thamizharasan Theatres	
A U G U S T	8	Red Flower	Andrew Pandian	Vignesh, Manisha Jashnani, Andrei Ilapichev, Nassar	Sri Kaligambal Pictures	
A U G U S T	8	Thangakottai	S. Sundharraj	Jayam Kumar, Nellai Siva, Kovai Senthil		
A U G U S T	8	Uzhavar Magan	P. Iyyappan	Vijith Saravanan	Subalakshmi Films	
A U G U S T	8	Vaanaran	Sriram Padmanabhan	Bijesh Nagesh, Akshaya, Jeeva Thangavel, Deepa Shankar	Orange Pictures	
A U G U S T	14	Coolie	Lokesh Kanagaraj	Rajinikanth, Nagarjuna, Upendra, Soubin Shahir	Sun Pictures	
A U G U S T	22	Indra	Sabarish Nanda	Vasanth Ravi, Mehreen Pirzada, Sunil, Anikha Surendran	JSM Productions, Emperor Entertainment	
A U G U S T	29	Gift	Pa Pandiyan	Sonia Agarwal, Birla Bose, Super Good Subramani, Crane Manohar	PP Cinemas	
A U G U S T	29	Kadukka	S. S. Murugarasu	Vijay Gowrish, Smeha Manimegalai, Adarsh Madhikanth, KVN Manimegalai	Vijay Gowrish Productions, Niyanth Media and Technology, Malarr Maarii Movies	
A U G U S T	29	Kuttram Pudhithu	Noah Armstrong	Tharun Vijay, Seshvitha Kanimozhi, Nizhalgal Ravi, Madhusudhan Rao	GKR Cine Arts	
A U G U S T	29	Naruvee	Subarak M	Harish Alag, Vinsu Rachel Sam, Padine Kumar, VJ Pappu	Harish Cinemas	
A U G U S T	29	Pei Kathai	Jean Moses	P. Vinoth, Aarya Lakshmi, Gaana Apelow, Suganya Shanmugam	Jerry's Journey International Production House	
A U G U S T	29	Sotta Sotta Nanaiyuthu	Naveedh S Fareedh	Nishanth Russo, Raja Elangovan, Varshini Venkat, Shaalini	Adler entertainment	
S E P T E M B E R	5	Bad Girl	Varsha Bharath	Anjali Sivaraman, Shantipriya, Saranya Ravichandran, Hridhu Haroon	Grass Root Film Company	
S E P T E M B E R	5	Gandhi Kannadi	Sherief	KPY Bala, Namita Krishnamurthy, Balaji Sakthivel, Archana	Adhimulam Creations	
S E P T E M B E R	5	Madharaasi	A. R. Murugadoss	Sivakarthikeyan, Biju Menon, Vidyut Jammwal, Rukmini Vasanth	Sri Lakshmi Movies	
S E P T E M B E R	12	Blackmail	Mu Maran	G. V. Prakash Kumar, Teju Ashwini, Srikanth, Bindu Madhavi	JDS Film Factory	
S E P T E M B E R	12	Bomb	Vishal Venkat	Arjun Das, Kaali Venkat, Shivathmika Rajashekar, Nassar	Gembrio Pictures	
S E P T E M B E R	12	Kaayal	Dhamayanthi	Lingesh, Gayathrie Shankar, Anumol, Ramesh Thilak	J Studios	
S E P T E M B E R	12	Kumaara Sambavam	Balaji Venugopal	Kumaran Thangarajan, Payal Radhakrishna, Kumaravel, Bala Saravanan	Six Star Productions, Venus Infotainment	
S E P T E M B E R	12	Madurai 16	S John Thomas	Jerome Vijay, Madurai Prasanna, Nivedha Dinesh, Rishi Misty	JS Films	
S E P T E M B E R	12	Thanal	Ravindra Madhava	Atharvaa, Ashwin Kakumanu, Lavanya Tripathi, Shah Ra	Annai Film Production	
S E P T E M B E R	12	Uruttu Uruttu	Baskar Sadhasivam	Ghajesh, Rithvika Shreya, Rajendran, Ashmitha Singh	Jai Studio Creations	
S E P T E M B E R	12	Yolo	S Sam	Dev, Devika, Badava Gopi, Praveen	MR Motion Pictures	
S E P T E M B E R	19	Kiss	Sathish Krishnan	Kavin, Preethi Asrani, Prabhu, VTV Ganesh	Romeo Pictures	
S E P T E M B E R	19	Padaiyaanda Maaveeraa	V. Gowthaman	V. Gowthaman, Pujita Ponnada, P. Samuthirakani, Saranya Ponvannan	V. K. Productions	
S E P T E M B E R	19	Shakthi Thirumagan	Arun Prabu	Vijay Antony, Sunil Kirpalani, Vagai Chandrasekhar, Cell Murugan	Vijay Antony Film Corporation	
S E P T E M B E R	19	Thandakaaranyam	Athiyan Athirai	V R Dinesh, Kalaiyarasan, Riythvika, Shabeer Kallarakkal	Neelam Productions, Learn and Teach Production Private Limited	
S E P T E M B E R	19	Thiral	Manoj Karthi	Ravi Prakash, Yuvan Mayilsamy, Meera Raj, Alfia	S. M. Tamilini Productions, C. P. Films	
S E P T E M B E R	26	Antha 7 Naatkal	M. Sundar	G. Vineeth Teja, S.M.Shri Swetha, K. Bhagyaraj, Namo Narayana	Bestcast Studios	
S E P T E M B E R	26	Balti (Note: The film was produced in both the Tamil and Malayalam languages)	Unni Sivalingam	Shane Nigam, Preethi Asrani, Alphonse Puthren, Shanthanu Bhagyaraj	STK Frames, Binu George Alexander Productions	
S E P T E M B E R	26	Kutram Thavir	M. Gajendra	Rishi Rithvik, Aradya Krishna, Sai Saindhavi, Saravanan	Sree Sai Saindhavi Creations	
S E P T E M B E R	26	Panai	Aathi P. Arumugam	M. Rajendran, Ganja Karuppu, Imman Annachi, Vadivukkarasi		
S E P T E M B E R	26	Right	Subramanian Rameshkumar	Natty Subramaniam, Arun Pandian, Akshara Reddy, Roshan Subash	RTS Film Factory	
S E P T E M B E R	26	Sareeram	GV Perumal	Tharsan Priyan, Charmy Vijayalakshmi, Shakeela, Madhumitha	GVP Pictures	

== October–December ==
Opening		Title	Director	Cast	Production company	Ref.
O C T O B E R	1	Idli Kadai	Dhanush	Dhanush, Nithya Menen, Arun Vijay, Shalini Pandey	Wunderbar Films, Dawn Pictures	
O C T O B E R	3	Maria	Hari K Sudhan	Saishri Prabhakaran, Pavel Navageethan, Sidhu Kumaresan, Vignesh Ravi	Dark Artz Entertainment	
O C T O B E R	9	Agni Paththu	Alexander Arumugam	Alex, Kottachi, Gandeeban, Sham	Agni Universe	
O C T O B E R	10	Akandan	Santhosh Nambirajan	Santhosh Nambirajan, Harini Prasanna		
O C T O B E R	10	Irudhi Muyarchi	Venkat Janaa	Ranjith, Meghali Meenakshi, Vittal	Varam Cinemas	
O C T O B E R	10	Kayilan	Arul Ajit	Sshivada, Ramya Pandian, Prajin, Abishek Joseph	BTK Films	
O C T O B E R	10	Marutham	V. Gajendran	Vidharth, Rakshana, Aruldoss, Saravana Subbiah	Aruvar Private Limited	
O C T O B E R	10	Rambo	M. Muthaiah	Arulnithi, Tanya Ravichandran, Abhirami, VTV Ganesh	Sun Entertainment	
O C T O B E R	10	Will	S. Sivaraman	Vikranth, Sonia Agarwal, Alekhya, Padam Venu Kumar	Foot Steps Production, Kothari Madras International	
O C T O B E R	17	Bison Kaalamaadan	Mari Selvaraj	Dhruv Vikram, Anupama Parameswaran, Lal, Rajisha Vijayan	Applause Entertainment, Neelam Studios	
O C T O B E R	17	Boogambam	Ishaq Hussaini	Ishaq Hussaini, Dilshana, Hema, Rishath	I International	
O C T O B E R	17	Dear Jeeva	Prakash V Baskar	TSK, Dheepshika	Sell Widely	
O C T O B E R	17	Diesel	Shanmugam Muthusamy	Harish Kalyan, Athulya Ravi, Vinay Rai, P. Sai Kumar	Third Eye Entertainment, SP Cinemas	
O C T O B E R	17	Dude	Keerthiswaran	Pradeep Ranganathan, Mamitha Baiju, R. Sarathkumar, Hridhu Haroon	Mythri Movie Makers	
O C T O B E R	17	Kambi Katna Kathai	Rajanathan Periyasamy	Natty Subramaniam, Singampuli, Mukesh Ravi, Sriranjini	Mangatha Movies	
O C T O B E R	24	IAS Kannamma	T. Rajachozhan	T. Rajachozhan, Princy, Attukutty, Baby Nethra	Thayappaswamy Films	
O C T O B E R	24	Thuchchaadhanan	Thalapathi Ramkumar	Saloni Sayuri, Singampuli, M. V. Tamilselvi	VG Studios, VIVA films, Thai Thiraiyarangam	
O C T O B E R	30	Desiya Thalaivar	R. Aravindraj	J.M. Bashir, Radha Ravi, Bharathiraja, Vagai Chandrasekhar	SSR Sathya Pictures	
O C T O B E R	31	Aan Paavam Pollathathu	Kalaiarasan Thangavel	Rio Raj, Malavika Manoj, Sheela Rajkumar, RJ Vigneshkanth	Drumsticks Production	
O C T O B E R	31	Aaryan	Praveen K	Vishnu Vishal, Shraddha Srinath, Vani Bhojan, Selvaraghavan	Vishnu Vishal Studioz	
O C T O B E R	31	Messenger	Ramesh Elangamani	Sriram Karthick, Manisha Jashnani, Fathima Nahum, Livingston	PVK Film Factory	
O C T O B E R	31	Meeladun Nabi	Millat Ahmad	Millat Ahmad, Imam M. S. Abdul Qaiyoom Baqavi, Imam S. M. S. Umar Rilvanullah Jamali	ZEE6 Movies	
O C T O B E R	31	Ram Abdullah Antony	Jayavel	Poovaiyar, Ajay Arnold, Arjun, Soundararaja	Annai Vailankanni Studio	
O C T O B E R	31	Thadai Athai Udai	Arivazhakan Murugesan	Mahesh, Guna Babu, Ganesh, Mahaadeer Mohammad	Ganthimathi Pictures	
N O V E M B E R	7	Aaromaley	Sarang Thiagu	Kishen Das, Shivathmika Rajashekar, Harshath Khan, Megha Akash	Mini Studio	
N O V E M B E R	7	Anal Mazhai	Ayyanarappan	Abdul Sherip, Pradap, Suba, Varish	Sai Ponniyamman Movies	
N O V E M B E R	7	Cristina Kathirvelan	SJN Alex Pandian	Kaushik Ram, Pratibha, Singampuli, Ganja Karuppu	Sri Lakshmi Dream Factory	
N O V E M B E R	7	Neyamuru	Sundara Vadivel	Sundara Vadivel, Prasanth, Praveen, Aravind	ASV Pictures	
N O V E M B E R	7	Others	Abin Hariharan	Aditya Madhavan, Gouri G. Kishan, Anju Kurian, Munishkanth	Grand Pictures	
N O V E M B E R	7	Pagal Kanavu	Faisal Raj	Faisal Raj, Krishnanthu, Athira Santhosh, Shakeela	Jasmine Films International	
N O V E M B E R	7	Thanthra	Vedha Mani	Anbu Mayilsamy, Swaminathan, Manobala, Nizhalgal Ravi		
N O V E M B E R	7	Vattakhanal	Pithak Pugazhenthi	Duruvan Mano, Meenakshi Govindarajan, R. K. Suresh, Mano	MPR Films, Skyline Cinemas	
N O V E M B E R	7	Veerathamizhachi	Suresh Bharathi	Swetha Dorathy, Sushmitha, Elayaa Sekar, Vela Ramamoorthy	Magizhini Kalaikoodam	
N O V E M B E R	14	Bhai: Sleeper Cell	Kamalanathan Bhuvan Kumar	Adhavaa Ishvvaraa, Nikkesha, Dheeraj Kher, Seemon Abbas	KRS Filmdom	
N O V E M B E R	14	Dawood	Prashanth Raman	Linga Dheenadayalan, Dileepan, Saara Aachar, Radha Ravi	Turm Production House, Generous Entertainments	
N O V E M B E R	14	Kaantha	Selvamani Selvaraj	Dulquer Salmaan, Samuthirakani, Bhagyashri Borse, Rana Daggubati	Spirit Media, Wayfarer Films	
N O V E M B E R	14	Kinaru	Harikumaran	Kanishkumar, Vivek Prasanna, Manojkannan, Ashwin	Madras Stories, Petra Studio	
N O V E M B E R	14	Kumki 2	Prabhu Solomon	Mathi, Arjun Das, Shritha Rao, Hareesh Peradi	Pen Studios	
N O V E M B E R	14	Madharas Mafia Company	A. S. Mukundan	Anandaraj, Samyuktha Shanmuganathan, Munishkanth, Deepa Shankar	Anna Productions	
N O V E M B E R	14	Soothattam	Sasi Sundharam		MSM Films	
N O V E M B E R	21	Iravin Vizhigal	Sikkal Rajesh	Mahendraa, Neema Ray, Nizhalgal Ravi, Scissor Manohar	Mahendra Film Factory	
N O V E M B E R	21	Mask	Vikarnan Ashok	Kavin, Andrea Jeremiah, Ruhani Sharma, Charle	The Show Must Go On, Black Madras Films	
N O V E M B E R	21	Middle Class	Kishore Muthuramalingam	Munishkanth, Vijayalakshmi Ahathian, Kaali Venkat, Radha Ravi	Good Show, Axess film factory	
N O V E M B E R	21	Poonga	KP Tanasekar	Kaushik, Sasi Dhaya, Aara, Brana Abdulsalam		
N O V E M B E R	21	Raja Veetu Kannukutty	A.P. Rajiv	Adhith Silambarasan, Gayatri Rema, KPY Sarath	Sri RR Movies	
N O V E M B E R	21	Theeyavar Kulai Nadunga	Dinesh Lakshmanan	Arjun Sarja, Aishwarya Rajesh, Abhirami Venkatachalam, Praveen Raja	GS Arts	
N O V E M B E R	21	Yellow	Hari Mahadevan	Poornima Ravi, Vaibhav Murugesan, Namita Krishnamurthy	Covai Film Factory	
N O V E M B E R	27	Rajini Gaang	Ramesh Baarathi	Rajini Kiishen, Dwiwika, Rajendran, Munishkanth	Mishri Enterprises	
N O V E M B E R	28	BP 180	JP	Tanya Ravichandran, Daniel Balaji, K. Bhagyaraj, Aruldoss	Radiant International Films, Atul India Movies	
N O V E M B E R	28	Friday	Hari Venkatesh	Dheena, Anish Masilamani, Mime Gopi, Ramachandran Durairaj	Dakdam Motion Pictures	
N O V E M B E R	28	Indian Penal Law	Karunanithi	TTF Vasan, Kushitha Kallapu, Kishore, Abhirami	Radha Film International	
N O V E M B E R	28	Ondimuniyum Nallapadanum	Sugavanam	Parotta Murugesan, Karthikeyan, Murugan, Vijayan	Thirumalai Production	
N O V E M B E R	28	Revolver Rita	JK. Chandru	Keerthy Suresh, Radhika Sarathkumar, Redin Kingsley, Mime Gopi	Passion Studios, The Route	
N O V E M B E R	28	Vellakuthira	Saranraj Senthilkumar	Harish Ori Arthanari, Abhirami Bose, Regin Rose, Melody Tarks	Nijam Cinema	
D E C E M B E R	5	Angammal	Vipin Radhakrishnan	Geetha Kailasam, Saran Shakthi, Mullaiyarasi, Bharani	Njoy Films, Firo Movie Station	
D E C E M B E R	5	Game of Loans	Abhishek Leslie	Abhinay Kinger, Nivas Adithan, Ester Noronha, Athwik Jalandhar	JRG Production	
D E C E M B E R	5	Kannagi Nagar	R. Dheena	A. Gautham, Dheepa Umapathi, S. Muthu Raj	Rajeev Menon Studios	
D E C E M B E R	5	Konja Naal Poru Thalaiva	Vignesh Pandiyan	Nishanth Russo, Gayathri Shan, Rajendran, Singampuli	Arudhran Pictures	
D E C E M B E R	5	Nirvaagam Porupalla	S. Kaarthieswaran	S. Kaarthieswaran, Livingston, Imman Annachi, Aadhavan	RK Dream Factory	
D E C E M B E R	5	Saa Vee	Anton Ajith	Udhaya Deep, Aadesh Bala, Aashika, Ratchasan Yasar	Anton Ajith Productions	
D E C E M B E R	5	Saaraa	Chellakutty	Chellakutty, Sakshi Agarwal, Yogi Babu, Thangadurai	Viswa Dream World	
D E C E M B E R	5	Stephen	Mithun Balaji	Gomathi Shankar, Michael Thangadurai, Smruthi Venkat, Kuberan	JM Production House	
D E C E M B E R	5	Galatta Family	A. Sarkunam	Vimal, Anicka Vikhraman, Thambi Ramaiah, Anandaraj, Vela Ramamoorthy, Rajendran, Delhi Ganesh	Guruparan International	
D E C E M B E R	12	Mahasenha	Dhinesh Kalaiselvan	Vimal, Yogi Babu, Kabir Duhan Singh, John Vijay	Marudham Productions	
D E C E M B E R	12	Yaaru Potta Kodu	Lenin Vadamalai	S M Prabakaran, Meghali Meenakshi, Lenin Vadamalai, Tuhin Che Guevara	Teacher's Stick Productions	
D E C E M B E R	19	Aiymbulan	Muruga Palani	Tamil Prakash, Mirdhula Nair, Besant Ravi	Kowsika Creations	
D E C E M B E R	19	Kanthanmalai	Veeramurugan	H. Raja		
D E C E M B E R	19	Kombuseevi	Ponram	R. Sarathkumar, Shanmuga Pandian Vijayakant, Tharnika, Kaali Venkat	Star Cinemas	
D E C E M B E R	19	Magabali	Ravipriyan	Aijay, Sakshi Megna, Bonda Mani	RDL Creations	
D E C E M B E R	19	Saayavanam	Anil Kumar	Soundararaja, Devananda Shajilal, Appukutty, Karnan Janaki	Damor Cinema Private Limited	
D E C E M B E R	19	Unpaarvayil	Kabir Lal	Parvati Nair, Ganesh Venkatraman, Master Mahendran	Lovely World Entertainment	
D E C E M B E R	25	Paruthi	A. Guru	Sonia Agarwal		
D E C E M B E R	25	Retta Thala	Kris Thirukumaran	Arun Vijay, Siddhi Idnani, Tanya Ravichandran, Yogesh Samy	BTG Universal	
D E C E M B E R	25	Sirai	Suresh Rajakumari	Vikram Prabhu, LK Akshay Kumar, Anishma Anilkumar, Anantha	Seven Screen Studio	

== See also ==
- List of Indian films of 2025
- Lists of Tamil-language films
- List of Tamil films of 2024
- List of Tamil films of 2026
- List of highest-grossing Tamil films
