= One Man (2026 film) =

- Theatrical release poster
- Directed by: Sankagiri Rajkumar
- Written by: Sankagiri Rajkumar
- Produced by: Sankagiri Rajkumar
- Starring: Sankagiri Rajkumar
- Cinematography: Sankagiri Rajkumar
- Edited by: Sankagiri Rajkumar
- Music by: Sankagiri Rajkumar
- Release date: 21 August 2026
- Running time: 100 minutes
- Country: India
- Language: Tamil

One Man is a 2026 Indian Tamil-language science fiction film written, directed, produced, and starring Sankagiri Rajkumar. The film is notable for being created entirely by a single person, with Rajkumar handling over 70 filmmaking departments including cinematography, editing, music, visual effects, sound design, and makeup. It was released theatrically on 21 August 2026.

== Plot ==
Five friends travelling by car to receive an award become stranded in a forest after their vehicle breaks down. While exploring the area, they discover an abandoned research facility (described in some accounts as a shut-down chemical factory or laboratory). Inside, they learn of a scientist's invention—a device or experimental serum capable of rendering the entire human population unconscious or freezing the world for a period of ten days.

After the five friends activate the invention, they find themselves as the only conscious people left on Earth. As they navigate the consequences of a world brought to a complete standstill, internal conflicts emerge. One of the friends becomes increasingly power-hungry and decides against restoring the rest of humanity, instead seeking to rule the frozen world alone. The remaining friends attempt to stop him, leading to a series of confrontations and adventures that take them across different locations, including high-stakes sequences involving trains, helicopters, and urban settings.

== Cast ==
- Sankagiri Rajkumar as 300 characters (including the five friends and other roles). CGI was used to help Rajkumar play different characters.

== Production ==
Sankagiri Rajkumar began work on the film in 2012 and spent at least six years completing it. He performed all major technical and creative roles without any crew assistance, a feat he has described as the first of its kind in feature film history. The production included complex sequences such as car chases, train collisions, helicopter scenes, and visual effects, all executed by Rajkumar alone. Rajkumar previously directed films such as Vengayam (2011) and Bioscope (2025). He is also a fifth-generation Therukoothu artist. The film was shot in Malaysia, Rohtang Pass and Seattle.

== Release ==
One Man was released theatrically on 21 August 2026. Due to limited theatrical performance, Rajkumar also released a paid subscription via its website.

== Reception ==
The film received praise from industry figures for its unique one-man production approach. It was reviewed by publications including Dinamalar, Maalai Malar, Chennai Vision and News Today.
