= Sindoor (1987 film) =

- Theatrical release poster
- Directed by: K. Ravi Shankar
- Written by: Kader Khan (dialogues)
- Screenplay by: Gyandev Agnihotri
- Story by: K. Rangaraj
- Based on: Unnai Naan Santhithen by K. Rangaraj
- Produced by: A. Krishnamurthy
- Starring: Shashi Kapoor; Jaya Prada; Govinda; Neelam
- Cinematography: K. V. Ramanna
- Edited by: Waman Bhonsle; Gurudutt Shrirali
- Music by: Laxmikant–Pyarelal
- Production company: Tinu International Films
- Release date: 14 August 1987
- Running time: 165 minutes
- Country: India
- Language: Hindi

Sindoor (transl. Vermilion) is a 1987 Indian Hindi-language drama film, produced by A. Krishnamurthy under the Tinu International Films banner, directed by K. Ravi Shankar. It stars Shashi Kapoor, Jaya Prada, Govinda and Neelam Kothari in leading roles, Kader Khan, Shakti Kapoor, Gulshan Grover, Asrani and Aruna Irani in supporting roles and also featuring special appearances by Jeetendra and Rishi Kapoor. The music is composed by Laxmikant–Pyarelal. The film was a remake of Tamil film Unnai Naan Santhithen (1984). It was released on 14 August 1987, along with Watan Ke Rakhwale, but still did well commercially and proved to be a box office hit as well as one of the highest grossing films of 1987.

== Plot ==
The film opens with widowed Laxmi, a loving and caring mother to Lalita, a young, college-going, devoted daughter. Ravi is a fellow collegian and a brilliant student. Gulshan Grover is also a student at the same college. Vijay Choudhury joins the college as an English Professor. He shares a good rapport with the students. After a few misunderstandings, Lalita and Ravi fall in love. At a college function, Lalita sings "Patjhad Saawan Basant Bahaar," where she forgets the lyrics, and Professor Vijay Choudhury completes the music. Upon asking how he knew the song, he replied that this was a very famous song and his wife's favorite. Lalita tells him she learned the song from her mother.

At his home, he remembers his wife, and here, the movie goes into a flashback. Vijay and Laxmi are a happily married couple. Vijay is a professor, whereas Laxmi is a singing partner to Kumar. They make a hit singing pair. This leads to a budding misconception between Vijay and Laxmi. Vijay forces Laxmi to leave the home. That day, Vijay learns that Kumar is getting married, and his misconceptions are cleared, but Laxmi is nowhere to be traced.

The movie comes back to the present. Laxmi knew about Lalita and Ravi's love. She met Advocate Dharamdas, Ravi's maternal uncle and guardian, who fixes their marriage with the condition of passing the final year exams with good numbers. Lalita asks Vijay for home tuition. On visiting Lalita's home, Vijay sees Laxmi in a widow's attire; completely shocked (again having misconceptions), he resigns from the college. Lalita informs Laxmi about this. Laxmi meets Vijay at his residence and tells him the story about her new avatar.

Again, a flashback. After leaving his home, Laxmi came to Pune to meet her friend Sunita, the only photograph shown in the movie). On the way, she saves a little girl named Lalita from an accident. Prem Kapoor is the girl's father. He thanks Laxmi and wants to drive her home. Here, she tells him about her friend Sunita. Prem informs her that he is Sunita's husband and, about her death, shows her Sunita's photograph in his room with a garland over it, signifying her death. He requests Laxmi to stay at least for a day as it is Lalita's birthday the next day and act like her mother as Lalita is a heart patient and she doesn't know about her mother's death. To which she initially disagrees with but finally acts like her mother. On the night of her birthday, Lalita is kidnapped by Shera, Prem's stepbrother. He asks for all of Prem's properties as a ransom. Prem agrees but is stabbed by Shera while saving Lalita. Shera is imprisoned. While taking his last breaths, he requests that Laxmi take care of and bring up Lalita as her child. To spare Lalita from any shock and not letting her know that she isn't her mother, Laxmi acquires widow's getup. The story is again back to the present. Vijay apologizes to Laxmi for misunderstanding her twice.

He rescinds his resignation and starts giving Lalita and Ravi home tuition at Lalita's place. Shera is back from jail and finds the whereabouts of Prem's family. Vijay and Laxmi began to meet each other once Ravi saw and informed Lalita about the affair between her mother and Professor Vijay. Lalita disbelieves, and they have a breakup. Ravi confronts Vijay and warns him to leave the city. Shera takes advantage of the situation and beats Vijay, telling him that Ravi is responsible. Laxmi, knowing about Vijay's condition, meets him. Lalita is shocked after she sees her mother hugging Professor Vijay. She tries to commit suicide and is saved by Ravi. She decides to leave her home with her father's photograph. Laxmi tries to stop her, but she leaves. Vijay meets Advocate Dharamdas and tells him all the story to reconcile the family. Ravi is furious seeing Vijay at his home and insults him. Dharamdas stops him and tells the story to Ravi. Shera again kidnaps Lalita. He again asks for the same ransom he asked for 14 years back, to which Laxmi agrees. Laxmi goes to meet Shera with the agreed ransom. Then, there is a good fight scene at the climax. Shera kills Gulshan Grover (Shera's nephew, also a bad guy). Shera shoots at Lalita. To save Lalita, Laxmi takes the bullet, is unconscious, and Professor Vijay holds her. Her mangalsutra, which she always hides, is out. Another misunderstanding and Lalita is all tears, ready to leave. Shera succumbs to the stabbing earlier in the climax by Gulshan Grover. Police arrive. Ravi stops Lalita. Advocate Dharamdas tells Laxmi's story to Lalita. Lalita realizes her mistake and asks for forgiveness from Laxmi. All reconcile.

== Cast ==
- Shashi Kapoor as Professor Vijay Choudhary
- Jaya Prada as Laxmi Choudhary
- Govinda as Ravi Khanna
- Neelam Kothari as Lalita Kapoor
- Rishi Kapoor as Kumar (Special appearance)
- Jeetendra as Prem Kapoor (Guest appearance)
- Moushumi Chatterjee as Sunita Kapoor (photo only)
- Prem Chopra as Heeralal/Pannalal (Dual Role)
- Kader Khan as Advocate Dharamdas
- Shakti Kapoor as Shera, step brother of Prem Kapoor
- Gulshan Grover as Nishant
- Asrani as Tea Seller Khairatlal
- Aruna Irani as Ram Katori
- A. K. Hangal as Mandir Pandit Pandey
- Ramesh Deo as Judge Prakash
- Vikas Anand as Doctor Mohan
- Baby Guddu as Child Lalita

== Soundtrack ==
Song	Singer
"Jhatpat Ghunghat Khol, Mukhda Dikha Haseena"	Kishore Kumar, Hariharan
"Patjhad Sawan Basant" (Solo)	Lata Mangeshkar
"Patjhad Sawan Basant Bahar" (Duet) - 1	Lata Mangeshkar, Suresh Wadkar
"Patjhad Sawan Basant Bahar" (Duet) - 2	Lata Mangeshkar, Mohammed Aziz
"Naam Sare Mujhe Bhool Jane Lage"	Lata Mangeshkar, Mohammed Aziz
"Chalo Chalo Chalen Door Kahin, Pyar Ke Liye Yeh Jagah Thik Nahin"	Kavita Krishnamurthy, Mohammed Aziz
"Patjhad Sawan Basant" (Solo)	Mohammed Aziz
