= Bioscope =

Bioscope may refer to:

== Cinema ==
- An early generic name for a movie camera
- Various specific models of movie camera and movie projector
  - The Urban Bioscope or Warwick Bioscope, camera and projector
  - Emil and Max Skladanowsky's Bioscop
- A bioscope show, a travelling movie theatre
- An obsolete regional term for a movie theater
- Bioscope Film Framers, an Indian film company

=== Films ===
- Bioscope (2008 film), an Indian film
- Bioscope (2015 film), an Indian drama film
- Bioscope (2025 film), an Indian comedy drama film
- Bioscopewala, a 2017 Indian film

== Others ==
- Bioscope (Live TV), a Bangladeshi video streaming platform
- Zee Bioskop, a movie channel broadcasting Indian films in Indonesia
- Le Bioscope, a former theme park in France
- BioScope: South Asian Screen Studies, a film studies journal for South Asian cinema
- Bioscope, a musical collaboration between Steve Rothery and Thorsten Quaeschning
