= Ellaichami =

1992 film by K. Rangaraj

- Poster
- Directed by: K. Rangaraj
- Screenplay by: K. Rangaraj
- Story by: P. L. Sundarrajan
- Produced by: K. Rangaraj
- Starring: R. Sarathkumar; Rupini
- Cinematography: K. Selvaraj
- Edited by: Srinivas Krishna
- Music by: S. A. Rajkumar
- Production company: Kala Chithra
- Release date: 11 September 1992
- Running time: 125 minutes
- Country: India
- Language: Tamil

Ellaichami is a 1992 Indian Tamil-language action drama film directed and produced by K. Rangaraj. The film stars R. Sarathkumar and Rupini, with Nassar, Vetri Vigneshwar and Gowri playing supporting roles. It was released on 11 September 1992, and failed at the box office. This was the last film Rangaraj directed for over 30 years, until the release of Konjam Kadhal Konjam Modhal (2025).

== Plot ==
In Nallur, Ellaichami is a brave village guard and chieftain who protects the people using his strength. His sister is in love with the village veterinarian. In the nearby Vallam village, Minor Muthurasu, a wealthy womanizer, repeatedly rapes village girls. In one such incident, Sevvanthi commits suicide, leaving behind a note. However, the corrupt police Inspector, bribed by Muthurasu, suppresses the case despite Sevvanthi's father lodging a complaint. Once, Muthurasu illegally diverts the canal water meant for Nallur. Ellaichami confronts Muthurasu, but Panchangam intervenes and stops the fight, forcing Muthurasu to release the water. Soon, Ellaichami discovers his sister's love affair and accepts their union.

One day, a woman named Kaveri arrives in Nallur claiming she was raped during the night and pleads with the villagers to help find the attacker. Ellaichami promises to identify the culprit and allows her to stay in the village. At Ellaichami's sister's wedding, Kaveri interrupts the ceremony to argue that any man—including the groom—could be guilty and demands that no marriage take place in the village until the rapist is found. Accepting the moral weight of her demand, Ellaichami stops the wedding and declares that no marriage will be conducted until justice is served. Ellaichami begins his investigation to find the rapist.

Humiliated by his earlier defeat, Muthurasu plots to steal Nallur's temple jewels on the eve of the festival to publicly disgrace Ellaichami. Acting on a tip from a drunkard, Ellaichami storms Muthurasu's bungalow at night, fights his men, and recovers the stolen jewels, saving the festival. Soon, Ellaichami discovers that his sister is pregnant before marriage. To protect her honor, he must arrange her wedding immediately—but the rapist case remains unresolved. To ensure his sister's marriage happens without opposition, Ellaichami falsely claims that he himself is Kaveri's rapist. Instead of punishing Ellaichami, Kaveri chooses to marry him. Simultaneously, Ellaichami marries Kaveri, while his sister marries her lover. On their wedding night, Ellaichami explains to Kaveri that he never raped her and married her only to protect his sister's honor. Kaveri shocks him by confessing that she was never raped at all—she fabricated the story to gain shelter in Nallur. Ellaichami's sister and her husband soon leave the village.

It is then revealed that Kaveri is Muthurasu's cousin. When her father arranged her marriage, an enraged Muthurasu murdered both the groom and Kaveri's father. He abducted Kaveri, but she escaped after attacking him with a glass bottle. Fearing for her life, she sought refuge in Nallur after hearing of Ellaichami's reputation. On her way, she met his sister, who advised her to marry Ellaichami for safety, and Ellaichami's sister even pretended to be pregnant to hasten the marriage between Ellaichami and Kaveri. The villagers, believing Ellaichami to be a molester, strip him of his chieftain position and appoint Kathirvelu as the new leader. Unable to bear the humiliation, Ellaichami lashes himself in anger.

Meanwhile, Muthurasu learns that Kaveri has married his rival. Acting on Panchangam's advice, he sends his henchman, Malayandi, to kill Ellaichami, but Ellaichami defeats him. Muthurasu confronts Kaveri and challenges her, vowing to defeat Ellaichami and claim her. He manipulates her into promising not to reveal this threat to her husband. Meanwhile, Ellaichami's mother grows suspicious upon noticing the couple's lack of intimacy and forces Kaveri to perform a strenuous ritual for marital harmony. During the ritual, Ellaichami saves Kaveri from falling into the temple pond. When Kaveri says he saved her because he cares for her, Ellaichami—still bitter—burns his hands in anger.

The new chieftain, Kathirvelu, soon reveals himself to be corrupt, looting village produce. Ellaichami intercepts the stolen goods lorry and returns the produce. Realizing Kathirvelu's involvement, he warns him privately at the request of Kathirvelu's wife, Karuvayi. Enraged, Kathirvelu allies with Muthurasu. During the festival ritual, where a pot is struck, Kathirvelu fills the pot with acid instead of turmeric water, intending to kill Ellaichami. Karuvayi discovers the plot and warns Kaveri, who warns Ellaichami. Distrusting Kaveri due to her past lies, Ellaichami ignores the warning. During the ritual, Kaveri slips just as Ellaichami strikes the pot, and the acid spills on her instead. Moved by her sacrifice, Ellaichami finally listens to her entire story. Kaveri begs him to protect the women of Vallam as well. Ellaichami and Kaveri begin a genuine married life.

Seeking revenge, Muthurasu murders Kathirvelu and frames Ellaichami for the crime. The corrupt inspector arrests Ellaichami, brutally tortures him, and announces his death. Believing Ellaichami to be dead, Muthurasu attacks Ellaichami's mother and abducts Kaveri, molesting her. However, Ellaichami regains consciousness, escapes custody, and storms Muthurasu's bungalow. After slaughtering his henchmen, he captures Muthurasu and drags him before Kaveri, allowing her to punish him. Before she can kill him, Karuvayi stabs Muthurasu to avenge her husband's death. Sevvanthi's father also stabs him, followed by the villagers collectively killing Muthurasu.

In the end, at the request of both Nallur and Vallam villages, Ellaichami is reinstated as the guardsman and chieftain of both the villages.

== Cast ==
- R. Sarathkumar as Ellaichami
- Rupini as Kaveri
- Nassar as Minor Muthurasu
- Vetri Vigneshwar as Ellaichami's brother-in-law
- Gowri as Ellaichami's sister
- R. Sundarrajan as Savitri's uncle
- Senthil as Savitri's husband
- Kovai Sarala as Savitri
- V. R. Thilakam as Ellaichami's mother
- Kokila as Karuvayi
- M. R. Krishnamurthy as Panchangam
- Raja Bahadur as Kathirvelu
- Peeli Sivam as a corrupt Inspector
- Azhagu as an invader
- Thideer Kannaiah as Muniyan
- Ponnambalam as Malayandi
- Tirupur Ramasamy as Annamalai

== Soundtrack ==
The music was composed by S. A. Rajkumar.

Song	Singer(s)	Lyrics	Duration
"Ye Sami Ellaichami"	Malaysia Vasudevan, K. S. Chithra	S. A. Rajkumar	4:38
"Naana Naana"	Mano, K. S. Chithra	Pulamaipithan	4:12
"Othakkal Mookupattu"	Malaysia Vasudevan	Pulamaipithan	3:50
"Rosave Rosave"	Malaysia Vasudevan, K. S. Chithra	Pulamaipithan	4:13
"Umai Kuyil Onnu"	P. Jayachandran	Pulamaipithan	4:43
"Jhanaku Jhanaku"	Anitha Suresh	Pulamaipithan	3:52
