= Nila Kaalam =

2001 film by Gandhi Krishna

- Screenplay by: Gandhi Krishna
- Story by: Sujatha
- Directed by: Gandhi Krishna
- Starring: Roja; Master Dinesh; Master Udayaraj; Baby Ranjini Pradeep
- Music by: Original Songs: Bharani; Background score: Sangeetha Rajan
- Country of origin: India
- Original language: Tamil

Production
- Producers: Media Dreams Limited; Sujatha
- Cinematography: M. V. Panneerselvam
- Editors: B. Lenin; V. T. Vijayan
- Production company: Media Dreams

Original release
- Release: 29 January 2001

Nila Kaalam (transl. Lunar period) is a 2001 Indian Tamil-language television film directed by Gandhi Krishna. The film stars Roja and several child artists. It was also released at film festivals and child artiste Master Udayaraj went on to win National Film Award for Best Child Artist. The film is based on Sujatha's novel Andru Un Arukil.

== Plot ==
The protagonists are three children — Nilaa (Baby Ranjini Pradeep), Amirdhalingam "Amar" (Master Dinesh) and Balasubramaniam "Pulli" (Master Udayaraj). The two boys work in a garage for the owner (Bala Singh) which is next to Nilaa's house.

Nilaa, daughter of a popular actress, Veni (Roja), who is estranged from her husband, has all the material comforts but yearns for company. Nilaa watches her mother shoot for a film with actor Ashok (Prabhu Deva). Soon, she strikes a friendship with the boys. The children `plan' a picnic and Nilaa provides the car, food and the works. Their excitement knows no bounds. But that day proves to be the last day of their carefree laughter, childish pranks and their innocence-filled childhood.

== Cast ==
- Roja as Veni
- Master Dinesh as Amar (Amirdhalingam)
- Master Udayaraj as Pulli (Balasubramaniam)
- Baby Ranjini Pradeep as Nilaa
- Nellai Sundarrajan as Pattabi
- Rasheed Ummer as Raja
- Bala Singh as the garage owner
- Durai Ramesh
- Vikram Dharma
- Manivannan
- Kalairani
- S. Rangarajan and Sujatha (guest appearance)
- Walter Devaram (guest appearance)
- Prabhu Deva as Ashok (guest appearance)
- Manobala (guest appearance)

== Release and reception ==
The film had a brief theatrical run after it was broadcast on television. Savitha Padmanabhan from The Hindu wrote that "Udayaraj as Pulli hogs the limelight. As the eight-year-old orphan who only dreams of being with his non- existent mother and is completely ignorant about the ways of the mean world, Udayaraj would give the best actor a run for his money". Malini Mannath of Chennai Online wrote "The director has been able to bring out some very natural and spontaneous performance from the three child artistes. But does a film targetted at children, and dealing with the story of lonely kids having innocent fun, deserve such a tragic ending?". Go4i.com appreciated the direction, cast performances, and screenplay.
