= Appatha =

- Release poster
- Directed by: Priyadarshan
- Written by: John Britto; Hardik Gajjar; Deepthi Govindarajan
- Produced by: Jyoti Deshpande; Suresh Balaje; George Pius
- Starring: Urvashi; Sidharth Babu
- Cinematography: Madhu Ambat
- Edited by: M. S. Aiyyappan Nair
- Music by: Rajesh Murugesan
- Production companies: JioStudios; Wide Angle Creations
- Release date: 29 July 2023
- Country: India
- Language: Tamil

Appatha (transl. Grandmother) is a 2023 Indian Tamil-language comedy drama film directed by Priyadarshan. It stars Urvashi (in her 700th film) and Sidharth Babu. The film was screened at the Shanghai Cooperation Organisation Film Festival in 2023. It premiered on JioCinema on 29 July 2023. The film was remade in Hindi as Aachari Baa (2025), which was also produced by Jio Studios.

== Plot ==
The plot revolves around a rural mother (Urvashi) to visit her son (Sam) who dwells in a city. The mother finds difficult to adapt the city lifestyle and she was left alone with her son's dog on one day. Initially, she was frightened by the dog and it turns the house into a mess. Later, the mother and dog share a bond. The story ends in a heart-warming note where mother finds an identity for herself after being yelled by her son on a stage.

== Cast ==
- Urvashi as Kannamma
- Den (dog) as Zeus
- Aruldoss as Azhagu Sundaram
- Amit Bhargav as Paavada Saamy aka Sam
- Kaveri Jha as Swaru
- Meghali as Avanti
- Sidharth Babu as Sakthi
- Semmalar Annam as Villager
- Y. G. Mahendran as Azhagu Sundaram's manager (guest appearance; uncredited)

== Production ==
=== Development ===
The film was announced on 19 November 2021 via a Facebook post, with official confirmation from the film's director Priyadarshan.

=== Filming ===
Principal photography commenced in November 2021 at Muthalamada railway station in Palakkad and filming was completed on 8 April 2022, with official confirmation from film director Priyadarshan.

== Soundtrack ==
Appatha

Soundtrack album by Rajesh Murugesan
- Released: 2023
- Recorded: 2022
- Genre: Feature film soundtrack
- Length: 3:57
- Language: Tamil

Official audio
- Appatha - Full Album on YouTube

No.	Title	Lyrics	Artist(s)	Length
1.	"Yengooru Kaathaayi"	Velmurugan	K. S. Chithra	3:57
Total length:				3:57

== Reception ==
Praveen Sudevan of The Hindu wrote "The difference between a sweet film and an annoying one lies in their contrasting effects on the audience. The former possesses the magical ability to captivate hearts, leaving viewers with a warm feeling long after the credits roll". P Sangeeta of OTT Play gave 2.5 out of 5 stars and wrote "Despite its flaws in terms of narration and character development, Appatha has moments that have our hearts. Veteran actress Urvashi is a delight to watch and that's a good enough reason to watch the film". Avinash G Ram of Vijaya Karnataka gave 3 out of 5 stars and says "The dog of the son's house welcomes the father who leaves the city and comes to his son's house in the city! The mother-in-law has to leave the mother with the dog at home and go on a trip. The story is about how Dad is in such a situation". Rajesh Duggumane of TV9 Kannada wrote "There is a need to do. Despite some of these limitations, animal lovers, those who like emotional stories, those who want heart-burning laughs can enjoy this movie". A critic from Ananda Vikatan wrote that "Appatta's witty verses with her husband's photo and verses about the changing diet with the changing times are delightful and bring a smile to the lips. For the first hour, everything falls into place and the screenplay moves into a feel-good film. After an hour of melodrama, the screenplay derails".
