= Unakkaagave Vaazhgiren =

- Title card
- Directed by: K. Rangaraj
- Screenplay by: M. S. Madhu
- Story by: Dennis Joseph
- Produced by: Ilango
- Starring: Sivakumar; Nadhiya; Suresh
- Cinematography: Dinesh Baboo
- Edited by: R. Bhaskaran; B. Krishnakumar
- Music by: Ilaiyaraaja
- Production company: Krishnalaya Production
- Release date: 15 August 1986
- Country: India
- Language: Tamil

Unakkaagave Vaazhgiren (transl. I am living for you) is a 1986 Indian Tamil-language film, directed by K. Rangaraj, starring Sivakumar, Nadhiya and Suresh. The film was a remake of the Malayalam film Shyama. It was released on 15 August 1986.

== Plot ==
Ravishankar is a leading music director in the Tamil film industry. After his wife Sakunthala's death, he stopped composing music and prefers to stay away from society. One day, he gets a letter from his music teacher Krishnamurthy Sastrigal, who stays in Ooty. Ravi leaves to Ooty to meet his guru. Krishnamurthy advises Ravi to come out of sorrow and start concentrating on music again. He also requests him to stay in Ooty for a few days so that it will help him overcome the pain. Ravi agrees and stays in the guest house of Vishnu, who happens to be Krishnamurthy's friend. Chithra is the only sister of Vishnu. Ravi visits Vishnu's house and plays a veena there. Chithra suddenly gets angry and shouts at Ravi not to play that. Later she feels bad for her rude behavior and apologizes to Ravi.

Slowly Ravi and Chithra become good friends. There comes a flashback for Chithra. Vijay is her relative and they both were in love. But one day suddenly, Vijay dies in an accident. Chithra is shocked by the accident, and she cannot recover from it. Following that, Chithra prefers to stay without marrying anyone. Similarly, Ravi tells his flashback where his wife died when the gas cylinder suddenly exploded at his home.

Friendship transforms into love between Ravi and Chithra. But Ravi understands that it was him, who hit Vijay in an accident a few years back, following which he died. This makes him feel guilty and he refuses the marriage with Chithra. Ravi also confesses the truth to Chithra.

Ravi's wife was badly hurt following cylinder explosion. Ravi was driving his car fast as he needs to admit her soon to the hospital. On the way, he hit Vijay who was riding a bike. Vijay was also badly hurt and requests help. Ravi at that moment tries to save only his wife and he leaves Vijay without helping. Vijay dies there. Ravi's wife also passes away. Now Ravi says to Chithra that though it was an accident, he feels guilty of killing a human and that's why he refuses marriage with Chithra. Though Chithra gets angry first, later she understands Ravi's position and the two get married.

== Cast ==
- Sivakumar as Ravishankar
- Nadhiya as Chitra
- Suresh as Vijay
- Menaka as Sakunthala
- Raveendran as Vishnu
- Chinni Jayanth
- Kullamani
- Ra. Sankaran as Krishnamurthy Sastrigal
- Senthil as Pattukottai
- Typist Gopu

== Production ==
The film was originally titled Alaipayuthey Kanne. Most of the filming was done at Ooty. The song "Kanna Unnai" was shot at Kodaikanal.

== Soundtrack ==
The soundtrack was composed by Ilaiyaraaja.

Song	Singers	Lyrics
"Ilanjolai"	S. P. Balasubrahmanyam	Vairamuthu
"Kanna Unnai"	S. Janaki, S. P. Balasubrahmanyam	Vairamuthu
"O Endhan"	S. Janaki	Muthulingam
"Kangal Rendum"	Malaysia Vasudevan, S. Janaki	Gangai Amaran
"Vera Vela Odumaa"	S. P. Balasubrahmanyam	Gangai Amaran

== Critical reception ==
Jayamanmadhan (a duo) of Kalki wrote the story gets stuck in a loop; here and there it loses balance. They added that if Dinesh Babu had failed to give pleasantness in Kodaikanal and Ilaiyaraaja had failed to give sweetness to the auditory nerves, the front half would have been sitting on a thorn. Jayamanmadhan called it a pity that even they could not save the second half. They called Sivakumar's flashback as generous but felt the scenes involving Suresh and Nadhiya were superficially treated.
