= Dharmam Vellum =

Tamil language film

- Poster
- Directed by: K. Rangaraj
- Screenplay by: M. S. Madhu
- Story by: K. Rangaraj
- Produced by: K. Rangaraj
- Starring: Vijayakanth; Sujatha; Gautami
- Cinematography: Rajarajan
- Edited by: Srinivas-Krishna
- Music by: Ilaiyaraaja
- Production company: Kalachithra
- Release date: 28 October 1989
- Running time: 140 minutes
- Country: India
- Language: Tamil

Dharmam Vellum (transl. Dharma will triumph) is a 1989 Indian Tamil-language action thriller film produced and directed by K. Rangaraj. The film stars Vijayakanth, Sujatha and Gautami. It was released on 28 October 1989, and was a box office failure.

== Plot ==
Jaganath lives with Saradha and his son Vijay happily, while Saradha's father constantly humiliates him because he does not have enough resources. Disturbed, Jaganath tries to explain to Saradha his father's inappropriate behavior towards him. With pride, one evening he abandons his wife and his son for whom he later integrates as police constable. Jaganath comes back to the house where he left them but they have moved. He sees her twenty five years later in crimes she committed and ends up in prison in which Inspector K. Jaganath appears as cop. She is sentenced to a death penalty but Vijay goes to her rescue in jail to save her. In confrontation with his father, he gives her a challenge to find her.

== Cast ==
- Vijayakanth as Inspector K. Jaganath and Vijay
- Sujatha as Saradha
- Gautami as Latha
- Rohini as Geetha
- Vijayachander as Gangadharan
- S. S. Chandran as Sethu
- Senthil as Gethu
- Kovai Sarala as Jimmy
- Chinni Jayanth as Subbaraj
- LIC Narasimhan as Doctor
- Srikanth as Jagar (guest appearance)
- Delhi Ganesh as Robert (guest appearance)
- Vijay Krishnaraj as Vishwanath (guest appearance)

== Soundtrack ==
The background music and songs of the film were composed by Ilaiyaraaja. The song "Devi Devi" has two versions; the audio version had S. P. Balasubrahmanyam, K. S. Chithra rendering vocals while the film had version had vocals by Gangai Amaran.

Song	Singers	Lyrics
"Devi Devi"	S. P. Balasubrahmanyam, K. S. Chithra	Gangai Amaran
"Ennathukku Ennai Petha"	Malaysia Vasudevan	Vaali
"Hey Maple Chella Maple"	K. S. Chithra	Gangai Amaran
"Poovodu Kaathu Vanthu"	Ilaiyaraaja, Jikki	Gangai Amaran

== Release and reception ==
Dharmam Vellum was released on 28 October 1989, alongside another Vijayakanth film Rajanadai. Dharmam Vellum underperformed at the box office, which led Rangaraj to face financial problems. P. S. S. of Kalki wrote although murder and mystery are the core, it is a sentimental film shows the relationship between husband and wife, mother and son in the form of the story and the clever direction.
