= Nenjamellam Neeye =

- VCD cover
- Directed by: K. Rangaraj
- Written by: K. Rangaraj
- Produced by: Indira
- Starring: Mohan; Radha; Poornima Jayaram
- Cinematography: Ravi Babu
- Edited by: R. B. Thilak; D. S. Maniam
- Music by: Shankar–Ganesh
- Production company: Indira Creations
- Release date: 29 April 1983
- Country: India
- Language: Tamil

Nenjamellam Neeye (transl. You are all over my heart) is a 1983 Indian Tamil-language romantic musical film written and directed by K. Rangaraj in his debut. The film stars Mohan, Radha and Poornima Jayaram. It was released on 29 April 1983.

== Cast ==
- Mohan as Mohan
- Radha as Susheela
- Poornima Jayaram
- Shankar–Ganesh (special appearance)
- S. P. Balasubrahmanyam (special appearance)
- Charuhasan (special appearance)
- Vennira Aadai Moorthy
- Goundamani
- Neelu
- Haja Sheriff
- Kumari Sachu
- Geetha

== Production ==
Nenjamellam Neeye is the directorial debut of Rangaraj who had earlier apprenticed with Bharathiraja. Filming took place mostly in Ooty, while a house and studio were shot in Chennai. According to Rangaraj, the Hindi film Abhimaan (1973) was a major influence on this film.

== Soundtrack ==
The music was composed by Shankar–Ganesh. Rangaraj felt it would be good if Ilaiyaraaja was the composer, but desisted from signing him due to budget constraints. The song "Yaaradhu Sollamal" attained popularity.

Track listing
No.	Title	Lyrics	Singer(s)	Length
1.	"Vayasuponnu"	M. G. Vallabhan	Vani Jairam, P. Jayachandran	4:02
2.	"Naalai Muthal"	Vaali	Vani Jairam	4:50
3.	"Yaaradhu Sollamal"	Vairamuthu	Vani Jairam	4:42
4.	"Oru Thamarai Mottu"	Gangai Amaran	S. P. Balasubrahmanyam, Vani Jairam	4:12
Total length:				17:46

== Reception ==
Jayamanmadhan of Kalki noted that the film was reminiscent of Abhimaan due to its predictable plot and characterisations and praised Rangaraj's direction, citing he has become adept at suddenly putting sudden brakes on the story and turning it around. Jayamanmadhan noted about Ravibabu's cinematography that in some places there is a wax pattern and in some places it glows like a sodium lamp, panned Haja Sheriff's humour as vulgar but praised Shankar–Ganesh's music. According to Rangaraj, the film was neither a failure nor highly successful.
