= Geethanjali (1985 film) =

- DVD cover
- Directed by: K. Rangaraj
- Written by: Vietnam Veedu Sundaram (dialogues)
- Screenplay by: K. Rangaraj
- Story by: R. Selvaraj
- Produced by: R. D. Bhaskar
- Starring: Murali; Nalini; Sathyaraj
- Cinematography: Dinesh Baboo
- Edited by: R. Bhaskaran; B. Krishnakumar
- Music by: Ilaiyaraaja
- Production company: Pavalar Creations
- Release date: 12 October 1985
- Country: India
- Language: Tamil

Geethanjali (/ɡiːθɑːndʒəli/) is a 1985 Indian Tamil-language film directed by K. Rangaraj. The film stars Murali, Sathyaraj, Bhavya and Nalini. It was released on 12 October 1985.

== Plot ==
James is a young orphan who is raised in a church by Father Lawrence, a Catholic priest. Koilpillai, a man who works in the same church is also very affectionate to James. James, though poor, is a kind and gentle soul, and is deeply in love with Julie, a poor girl who makes a living by selling rides on her horse. One day, James encounters Diana, a wealthy young woman who is immediately attracted to him. Diana owns and manages the industrial enterprise bequeathed by her late father who chose her for running the business, over her brother Antony, who is an irresponsible ruffian. Diana appoints James as the general manager of her business which riles Antony who berates his sister for falling for someone much below their social class.

James while receiving blessings from the church elders after his new job at Diana's enterprise, expresses his anguish about being fatherless. This prods Koilpillai to later reveal to a stunned Father Lawrence that James is Koilpillai's own son whom he had abandoned as a child outside the church due to poverty. Father Lawrence magnanimously accepts the fact and reassures Koilpillai that his past action was of good intent.

Diana approaches Father Lawrence and expresses her wish to marry James and promises to fund the entire expense of the new church that Father Lawrence has been constructing. Lawrence, unaware of James's relationship with Julie, is delighted by Diana's proposal, since he feels it will transform James's life, besides helping the church. James, who has been steadfastly loyal to Father Lawrence through his whole life, is unable to refuse his command and agrees to wed Diana. He informs a distraught Julie of his decision who accuses him of ditching her for wealth and wanders around heart-broken.

However things take a turn when Koilpillai learns about Julie's love affair with James and informs Father Lawrence who, much to the delightful surprise of James, announces at a ceremony in the new church that James will indeed marry Julie.

A disappointed Diana reconciles to her fate but her brother Antony decides to exact revenge for the slight to his sister and plans to disrupt James's wedding with Julie. Antony learns that Koilpillai is James's father and James is not a Christian by birth and instigates the villagers to riot over the wedding, calling it blasphemous.

In the midst of the riots, James and Julie try to flee the village but are blocked and attacked by Antony who in the end is shot dead by his own sister Diana. Diana unites the hands of James and Julie and wishes them a life of happiness.

== Cast ==
- Murali as James
- Sathyaraj as Antony
- Nalini as Diana
- Bhavya as Julie
- Goundamani
- Poornam Viswanathan as Father Lawrence
- Senthil
- Kumarimuthu
- Karikol Raju

== Production ==
The film was originally titled Thulli Ezhundhathu Paattu.

== Soundtrack ==
The soundtrack was composed by Ilaiyaraaja.

Track listing
No.	Title	Lyrics	Singer(s)	Length
1.	"Thulli Ezhunthathu"	Vaali	K. S. Chithra, Ilaiyaraaja
2.	"Oru Jeevan" (Happy)	Vairamuthu	Ilaiyaraaja, K. S. Chithra
3.	"Kiliye Kiliye"	Vairamuthu	Ilaiyaraaja
4.	"Malare Pesu"	Vaali	K. S. Chithra, Ilaiyaraaja
5.	"Oru Jeevan" (Pathos)	Vairamuthu	Ilaiyaraaja, K. S. Chithra
6.	"Otha Rupa"	Vaali	Sundarrajan, Malaysia Vasudevan, S. N. Surendar

== Critical reception ==
Jayamanmadhan (a duo) of Kalki called it a typical love triangle story and added the film speaks about caste, Hindu and Christian conflict but without any depth. The duo concluded the review saying Selvaraj should try something different plot and the makers of Geethanjali should do it. Ananda Vikatan reviewed the film negatively for its cliched, predictable story and the comedy subplot, also feeling the caste angle was forced into a love story.https://i0.wp.com/macsendisk.com/wp-content/uploads/2021/05/Geethanjali-Tamil-FIlm-LP-VInyl-Record-by-Ilayaraaja-www.masendisk.com-2.jpg?fit=845%2C768&ssl=1
