= Paadu Nilave =

1987 film by K. Rangaraj

- Theatrical release poster
- Directed by: K. Rangaraj
- Screenplay by: M. G. Vallabhan
- Story by: R. Selvaraj
- Produced by: Ilango
- Starring: Mohan; Nadhiya
- Cinematography: Dinesh Baboo
- Edited by: Srinivas Krishna
- Music by: Ilaiyaraaja
- Production company: Krishnalaya Productions
- Distributed by: Moogambigai Cine Distributors
- Release date: 15 May 1987
- Running time: 120 minutes
- Country: India
- Language: Tamil

Paadu Nilave (transl. Oh Moon, please sing) is a 1987 Indian Tamil-language romantic musical film, directed by K. Rangaraj and written by M. G. Vallabhan from a story by R. Selvaraj. The film stars Mohan and Nadhiya, with Ravichandran, Senthil, Vennira Aadai Moorthy, J. V. Somayajulu, A. R. Srinivasan and Typist Gopu in supporting roles. It was released on 15 May 1987 and became a commercial success.

== Plot ==
Balakrishnan "Balu" is a die hard fan of singer Sangeetha. By chance she visits Balakrishnan's village on vacation. When he tries to meet her, he is continuously ragged and insulted by her and her assistants. One day when Sangeetha hears him sing near a beach, she realises his talent and also learns about his struggles. They become good friends and Sangeetha wishes to stay in the village for longer. However her father comes and immediately takes her back to Chennai for her singing events and she leaves without informing Balakrishnan. Balakrishnan heartbroken goes to Chennai in search of her and finally when he reaches her home, he gets insulted. On that day he decides to take revenge on her by becoming a popular singer just like her. He is helped by a policeman who suggests that he learn singing from a man in jail. So Balu goes to the jail where he finds the man to be his father. But he does not reveal the truth in fear of being unable to learn from his father.

After learning proper music, Balu becomes a good singer. He meets Sangeetha while in jail where she comes to sing in a function. He sings in front of her and she becomes very happy while he remains angry. She later gives him the chance to begin his career as a singer at her own studio and he becomes famous. Now she meets singer Balu at his house but he insults her the same way she did at her house. She then tells all the truth that she insulted him to protect him from her money minded father. He then acts as if he believed her and embraces her while planning his revenge. They get married and the next day Balu leaves her at her home. When enquired about why he behaves so, he says he did it all to take revenge on her and her father. It is revealed that Sangeetha's father killed Balu's sister and his innocent father was framed for the same and sent to jail. Balu challenges Sangeetha for a music competition with the condition that the loser should never sing again. Her father decides to kill Balu on the day of the competition. All the efforts to prevent this go in vain and the competition begins. Both of them sing fabulously and in the end, Sangeetha gets injured while protecting Balu and her father is shot dead by the police. He gives a last statement that Balu's father is innocent and he is the killer. Balu's father is released from the jail. Balu and Sangeetha finally unite.

== Cast ==
- Mohan as Balakrishnan "Balu"
  - Baby Sujitha as young Balu
- Nadhiya as Sangeetha
- Ravichandran as Ramanathan
- Senthil as Thiri Vetti
- Vennira Aadai Moorthy as Moorthy
- J. V. Somayajulu as Muthaiya Bhagavathar
- A. R. Srinivasan as Jailar
- Typist Gopu as Inspector
- Kalaranjini as Lalitha (guest appearance)

== Soundtrack ==
The soundtrack was composed by Ilaiyaraaja and lyrics were written by Vaali. The song "Malaiyoram Veesum Kaathu" is set in the Carnatic raga known as Keeravani, and "Vaa Veliye" is set in Shubhapantuvarali.

Track listing
No.	Title	Singer(s)	Length
1.	"Kuthamma Nellu Kuthu"	K. S. Chithra, Chorus	4:27
2.	"Malaiyoram Veesum Kaathu"	S. P. Balasubrahmanyam	4:57
3.	"Kokkarako Koovura"	Mano, K. S. Chithra	4:44
4.	"Malaiyoram Veesum Kathu" (male)	S. P. Balasubrahmanyam	1:12
5.	"Paadungal Paattu Paadungal"	K. S. Chithra, S. P. Balasubrahmanyam	4:10
6.	"Chithirai Maadhathu Nilavu"	Mano, K. S. Chithra	4:30
7.	"Vaa Veliyae Ilam Poonguyile"	Mano, K. S. Chithra	6:33
8.	"Malaiyoram Veesum Kathu" (female)	K. S. Chithra	1:13
Total length:			31:46

== Release and reception ==
Paadu Nilave was released on 15 May 1987, and distributed by Moogambigai Cine Distributors. The following week, The Indian Express wrote, "This thoroughly contrived storyline banks itself eagerly on the revenge element, and coming to think of it, its essential structure bears many similarities to last year's hit Amman Kovil Kizhakale and Uyire Unakkaga." Jayamanmadhan (a duo) of Kalki wrote that, despite dealing with an old wine of an ordinary fan transforming into a top singer, the way screenplay has been stitched by adding elements like accused father, deceased sister and the long lost son it makes the mix more better. They also praised Mohan-Nadhiya's pairing, A. R. Srinivasan's performance and the cinematography but panned the climax, calling it absurd in an otherwise balanced plot. The film was commercially successful.

== Bibliography ==
- Sundararaman (2007) [2005]. Raga Chintamani: A Guide to Carnatic Ragas Through Tamil Film Music (2nd ed.). Pichhamal Chintamani. OCLC 295034757.
