= Aaruthra =

2018 Indian film directed by Pa. Vijay

- Theatrical release poster
- Directed by: Pa. Vijay
- Written by: Pa. Vijay
- Produced by: Pa. Vijay
- Starring: Pa. Vijay; Meghali
- Music by: Vidyasagar
- Production company: VIL Makers
- Distributed by: Thenandal Studio Limited
- Release date: 31 August 2018
- Running time: 126 minutes
- Country: India
- Language: Tamil

Aaruthra is a 2018 Indian Tamil-language film directed by Pa. Vijay, who also produced the film, wrote the songs, and played the lead role with Meghali. S. A. Chandrasekhar and Bhagyaraj portraying supporting roles. The film was released on 31 August 2018.

== Plot ==
Avudaiappan, a private detective, develops suspicion over Shiva, who lives with his family in Chennai. When the latter is almost caught red-handed, he comes up with the reason why he is into killing people. The flashback shows Shiva lives happily with family consisting his father, his mother and his sister, Aaruthra. Shiva has a friend named Nambi but his betrayal leads Aaruthra get raped and killed. Shiva's parents died too. Shiva was shattered and vows to seek revenge on his family death. In the end, he kills Nambi, thus avenging his family's death.

== Cast ==
- Pa. Vijay as Shivamalai (Shiva)
- Meghali as Parvathi, Nambi'a wife
- K. Bhagyaraj as Avudaiappan
- S. A. Chandrasekhar as Rudhramoorthy, Shiva's father
- Meera Krishnan as Chamundi, Shiva's mother
- Gnanasambandham as Shiva's uncle
- Yuvasri Lakshmi as Aarudhra, Shiva's sister
- Vignesh as Nambi, Shiva's relative who betrays him
- Joe Malloori as A. M. Thanikachalam (AMT), antagonist who rapes Aarudhra
- Rajendran as Avudaiappan's assistant
- Sanjana Singh as Avudaiappan's wife
- Y. G. Mahendran as Ramanujam
- Mayilsamy

== Soundtrack ==
The soundtrack was composed by Vidyasagar.

Track listing
| No. | Title | Singer(s) | Length |
|---|---|---|---|
| 1. | "Chellama" | Karthik, Varsha Ranjith |
| 2. | "Paavadai" | Sanjana Kalmanje |
| 3. | "Aaruthram" | Karthik, Sriram, Narayanan Ravishankar |
| 4. | "Munimaa" | Sanjana Kalmanje |
| 5. | "Puli Onnu" | Pa. Vijay |

== Critical reception ==
Thinkal Menon from The Times of India gave the film a rating of two out of five stars and wrote that "The messages put across in the film, highlighting the alarming child abuses, looks good on paper, but the execution falls flat". Sify wrote, "Pa.Vijays intention to deliver a message against child abuse is laudable, the film fails big time in the execution part." Gopinath Rajendran of The New Indian Express wrote, "Aaruthra is a product of lazy storytelling that borrows liberally from other films and hopes that pegging it on a current issue will make it work. Well, unfortunately, it doesn't".
