= College Road (film) =

2022 Tamil language drama film

- Theatrical release poster
- Directed by: Jai Amar Singh
- Written by: Jai Amar Singh
- Produced by: Praveen; Sarath
- Starring: Lingesh; Monica Chinnakotla; Ananth Nag
- Cinematography: Karthick Subramaniyam
- Edited by: Ashok H. Anthony
- Music by: OfRo
- Production company: MP Entertainment
- Distributed by: PVR Pictures
- Release date: 30 December 2022
- Running time: 124 minutes
- Country: India
- Language: Tamil

College Road is a 2022 Indian Tamil-language drama film directed by Jai Amar Singh and starring Lingesh, Monica Chinnakotla, Ananth Nag and Bommu Lakshmi in the lead roles. It was released on 30 December 2022.

== Cast ==
- Lingesh as Ajay
- Monica Chinnakotla as Kiran
- Ananth Nag as Arul
- Akshay Kamal as Rajesh
- Bommu Lakshmi as Swetha
- Madras Vinoth as Maaran
- Adavadi Ansar
- Maheswaran Gandhi

== Production ==
The film marked the directorial debut of Jai Amar Singh, who previously assisted director I. Ahmed on Endrendrum Punnagai (2013). He wrote the script in 2016 based on his experiences accumulated during his education at University of Bedfordshire in the UK and the process of applying for it. The film's title was derived from the name of the noted road in Chennai that serves as a link route to a few colleges in the city, including Loyola College and Stella Maris College. The film marked the first lead role for actor Lingesh, who had previously played supporting roles.

Production began in October 2020 in Chennai and was wrapped up in 25 days. The team shot at an IT company and used CGI shots to get the look of the setting correct. Singh noted that he drew inspiration from the sets in Kadhalar Dhinam (1999) for the film.

== Reception ==
The film was released on 30 December 2022 across Tamil Nadu. A reviewer from Dina Thanthi gave the film a middling review. A reviewer from Maalai Malar called the film "enjoyable", while a reviewer from Dinamani also praised the film's story. Critic Malini Mannath noted "College Road is at its best a promising effort by a debutant director and his team".
