= Amudha Gaanam =

- Theatrical release poster
- Directed by: K. Rangaraj
- Story by: S. Jagadeesan
- Produced by: C. Kalavathi; K. Revathi
- Starring: Vijayakanth; Nalini
- Cinematography: Dinesh Baboo
- Edited by: R. Devarajan
- Music by: Ilaiyaraaja
- Production company: Vassan Productions
- Release date: 19 July 1985
- Country: India
- Language: Tamil

Amudha Gaanam (transl. Elixir Moment) is a 1985 Indian Tamil-language drama film directed by K. Rangaraj and produced by Vassan Productions. The film stars Vijayakanth and Nalini, with Sarath Babu, Sulakshana and Baby Shalini in supporting roles. It was released on 19 July 1985.

== Cast ==
- Vijayakanth as Sundaram
- Nalini as Thayamma
- Sarath Babu
- Sulakshana
- Goundamani
- Sivachandran
- Senthil
- Haja Sheriff
- Typist Gopu
- Kumarimuthu
- Usilai Mani
- Baby Shalini as Meena

== Production ==
The filming was primarily held at Kodaikanal.

== Soundtrack ==
The music was composed by Ilaiyaraaja. The song "Orey Raagam" was later reused in the Telugu film Abhinandana (1988) as "Ade Neevu". The song "Velli Nila Padhumai" is set to the Carnatic raga Suddha Dhanyasi, and attained popularity. That song was also reused by Ilaiyaraaja in Telugu as "Rangulalo Kalalo" for Abhinandana.

Track listing
No.	Title	Singer(s)	Length
1.	"Orey Raagam"	K. J. Yesudas, S. Janaki	4:40
2.	"Velli Nila"	Ramesh, Vani Jairam	4:12
3.	"Chinnanjiru Kannu Rendum"	P. Susheela	3:53
4.	"Thathedutha" (happy)	S. Janaki	2:58
5.	"Thathedutha" (sad)	S. Janaki	2:06
Total length:			17:49

== Critical reception ==
Anna praised the acting of the cast, cinematography, humour, direction and music and concluded saying this film will impress female audience.

== Legacy ==
Following Vijayakanth's death in 2023, Film Companion included the film in their list "7 Vijayakanth Films That Left an Indian Cinema Legacy".
