= Nirbhoya =

2018 Indian Bengali film

- Bengali: নির্ভয়া
- Directed by: Milan Bhowmik
- Screenplay by: Sudeshu Shivam
- Story by: Sumantra Chatterjee
- Produced by: Sanjib Samaddar
- Starring: Raaj Bhowmik; Meghali
- Cinematography: B. Satish
- Music by: Arunava Chakrabarty
- Production companies: Sambit Media and Productions
- Release date: 31 August 2018
- Country: India
- Language: Bengali

Nirbhoya is a 2018 Bengali film directed by Milan Bhowmik and produced by Sanjib Samaddar under the banner of Sambit Media and Productions. The film is based on the 2012 Delhi gang rape case. Apart from West Bengal, the film was also to be released in other states like Orissa, Assam and Bihar. Another version of the film, dubbed in Hindi script editing in Hindi done by Sudeshu Shivam was also to be released.

== Cast ==
It is also about the conscience of people which needs to be changed. The trigger for me definitely was the Delhi gang rape and the huge protest that rocked the nation. But the protests also provoked me to think if such an agitation alone can stop the crime. But the big question is whether after the protests, rapes have come down in India. No, and perhaps here is where we have to address the problem for a real solution beyond laws and legalese.

— Director Milan Bhowmik regarding the plot of his new film.

- Meghali as Nirbhaya
- Raaj Bhowmik as Nirbhaya's friend
- Jaysree
- Amrapali
- Riya
- Soumitra Chatterjee as the Chief Minister
- Sreelekha Mitra
- Badshah Maitra
- Mrinal Mukherjee
- Ashish Vidyarthi as a police officer
- Rajesh Sharma
- Biplab Chatterjee
- Ramen Roychowdhury
- Gouri Shankar Panda
- Subhasish Mukhopadhyay
- Kalyan Chatterjee

== Production ==
=== Making ===
In an interview, Ashish Vidyarthi said that the director of Nirbhoya was inspired to make this film after he read a report of a rape and mutilation of a victim of South Africa soon after the Delhi incident. The victim of the rape was a 23-year-old trainee physiotherapist whose real name was Jyoti Singh, but she came to be known as Nirbhaya, meaning "fearless". However, during a press meet at the Press Club Kolkata, director Milan Bhowmik said that the film is not based on the Delhi rape case, but actually on the present scenario of our society. He added that the film will create a sense of responsibility among his viewers. The mahurat of Nirbhoya was held at the Floatel Hotel in Kolkata on 11 February 2013.

According to the director, the aim of the film is to make the people aware that anti-rape laws or street protests alone cannot prevent the repetition of such a dangerous event. Though the incident was set in Delhi, the characters of the film would be based in West Bengal. The film is also the first project of the production house, Sambit Media and Productions.

=== Filming ===
Filming of Nirbhoya started on 5 February 2013 and was completed by April 2013. There will be sequences in the film where the bus will be passing through various streets of New Delhi and police checkpoints. There will be various sub-plots depicting diverse types of sexual crimes. Some action sequences are also in the film, shot with the assistance and supervision of fight director Judo Ramu.

=== Casting ===
The film will introduce many newcomers, including Raaj, Meghali, Jaysree, Amrapali and Riya, who will play important roles representing the awakening of the younger generation. Every female character in the film will be the victim of various dangerous incidents.

== Soundtrack ==
Arunava Chakrabarty composed the film score for Nirbhoya. The playback singers include Shreya Ghoshal and Shaan. It was reported that the soundtrack will consists of around three songs. NDTV also reported that will not be much songs in the film.

== See also ==
- Satyagraha
