= Gramatthu Minnal =

- Title card
- Directed by: K. Rangaraj
- Story by: Peter Selvakumar
- Produced by: G. K. Venkatesh; Ilango
- Starring: Ramarajan; Revathi
- Cinematography: Ilavarasan
- Edited by: Srinivas–Krishna
- Music by: Ilaiyaraaja
- Production company: Keerthana Creations
- Release date: 18 December 1987
- Country: India
- Language: Tamil

Gramatthu Minnal (transl. Lightning of the village) is a 1987 Indian Tamil-language drama film directed by K. Rangaraj, starring Ramarajan and Revathi. It was released on 18 December 1987.

== Plot ==
The film opens with Valli Mayilu voluntarily surrendering to the villagers after murdering an unidentified man. The village panchayat decides to detain her until the police arrive the next morning. While in confinement, Valli begins recounting her past.

Valli Mayilu was a playful young woman raised by her maternal grandmother, Ponnatha. She earned her living by tending the villagers' goats. The village president, Velayutham Pillai, and the former president, Karmegam Servai "Karmegam", were bitter rivals who constantly clashed over power. Selvarasu arrived in the village, claiming Ponnatha as his paternal grandmother. Still angry with Selvarasu's father for eloping years ago, Ponnatha denied him and chased him away. However, Selvarasu overheard her privately telling Valli that he truly is her grandson but that she could not shelter him. Heartbroken, Selvarasu left but rescued an elderly, drunk man, Sannasi Nadar "Sannasi", from an oncoming train. Sannasi had been drowning in grief after his wife Parvathi died in a train accident years earlier. Grateful, Sannasi and his daughter, Ponnuthai, welcomed Selvarasu into their home, and Selvarasu tended his goats.

Selvarasu met Valli Mayilu and learned they were cousins, and soon developed feelings for her. Once, he endured beatings from a goat buyer to retrieve a goat kid that Valli cherished. Then, Selvarasu saved Valli's goats from being swept away by a rushing river, but in doing so, his own goats were carried away. The goat owner Chettiyar accused Selvarasu of negligence, while Ponnatha—already resentful—suspected him of theft. The villagers tied Selvarasu to a lamppost overnight, but the next morning, the goats returned safely, clearing his name. Valli apologized, realizing he had lost his goats while saving hers. Later, Velayutham Pillai's brother-in-law and a friend attempted to harass Valli, but Selvarasu beat and chased them away. Touched by his courage, Valli too fell in love with him.

Soon, a wealthy businessman named Raja entered the village after meeting with an accident. Valli cared for him until he woke up. Seeing an opportunity for profit, rivals Velayutham Pillai and Karmegam joined forces to exploit Raja's wealth by pretending to be his well-wishers. They brought Valli to treat Raja's sprain using her traditional foot therapy. Raja, already attracted to her, decided to marry her and settle in the village. Raja began courting Valli, gifting her items like talcum powder she admired at the market. Rumors of their marriage spread through the village, frightening her. She asked Selvarasu to speak to Ponnatha, but Ponnatha strongly refused, insisting she wanted a rich groom for Valli and even threatening to harm herself if Selvarasu pursued the marriage.

Encouraged by Raja's wealth, Velayutham Pillai and Karmegam pressured Ponnatha and Valli to agree. When persuasion failed, they deceived Valli by claiming Raja had injured himself again. When she realized the lie while attempting treatment, she burned her foot in anger and scolded Raja for tricking her. They next tried bribing Selvarasu to abandon his love, but he refused. Meanwhile, Sannasi tried arranging Ponnuthai's marriage but failed to secure a loan. Overcome with despair, he committed suicide. Grief-stricken, Ponnuthai attempted suicide, but Selvarasu saved her. Out of gratitude, Selvarasu arranged her marriage as planned, using Valli's house documents to raise funds for the wedding.

After Ponnuthai's marriage, Selvi arrived in the village, claiming she was Selvarasu's wife. At the panchayat, she produced a fake wedding photograph. Unable prove the lie, Selvarasu was forced to accept Selvi. Believing this, Valli attempted suicide but was stopped by Selvi, who confessed the truth—that she was never Selvarasu's wife. Though Selvi left a letter of confession, the panchayat refused to accept it in her absence. Valli brought a witness to Selvi's confession—Kodhai, Velayutham Pillai's wife. Ashamed of their injustice, the panchayat postponed judgment. Ponnatha admitted Selvarasu was her grandson and begged him to give up Valli so she could live a wealthy life with Raja. Raja promised Velayutham Pillai and Karmegam a luxurious bungalow if they helped him marry Valli. They bribed villagers to pressure her. Now, with the entire village against them, Valli decided to elope with Selvarasu. As Valli prepared to leave, Ponnatha stopped her but had a change of heart and blessed their union.

However, Velayutham Pillai's men abduct Selvarasu and Ponnatha, threatening Valli to kill them unless she agreed to marry Raja and forced her to pretend she loved him. At the temple, seeing Valli in tears, Raja sensed something was wrong. When she revealed the truth, Raja refused to marry her by force and urged her to escape. Also, Karmegam—no longer willing to commit murder—released them and sent Selvarasu to stop the wedding. Enroute Selvarasu subdued Velayutham Pillai's men and finally reunited with Valli. But Velayutham Pillai stabbed Selvarasu fatally with a spear, and Selvarasu died in Valli Mayilu's arms. Driven by rage, Valli killed Velayutham Pillai, the murder shown at the beginning of the film.

Back in the present, as the police arrive to arrest her, they discover that Valli Mayilu has also died. The film ends with Raja and Karmegam cremating Selvarasu and Valli side by side, while the entire village mourns the tragic lovers.

== Cast ==
- Ramarajan as Selvarasu
- Raja as Raja
- Senthamarai as Velayutham Pillai
- Goundamani as Karmegam Servai "Karmegam"
- Revathi as Valli Mayilu
- S. N. Lakshmi as Ponnatha
- MLA Thangaraj as Chettiyar
- Omakuchi Narasimhan as Vaanayanam
- Usilai Mani as Iyer
- S. N. Parvathy as Kodhai
- Pasi Narayanan as a bedsheet vendor
- Nalinikanth as Velayutham Pillai's brother-in-law
- A. K. Veerasamy as Sannasi Nadar "Sannasi"
- Thayir Vadai Desigan as a shopkeeper in the market
- Raasi as Selvi

== Production ==
The song "Vatti Edutha" was shot at Gobichettipalayam and Mettupalayam.

== Soundtrack ==
The soundtrack was composed by Ilaiyaraaja.

Track listing
No.	Title	Lyrics	Singer(s)	Length
1.	"Kanne En"	Gangai Amaran	K. S. Chithra	4:42
2.	"Nee Pogum"	Gangai Amaran	Malaysia Vasudevan, K. S. Chithra	4:43
3.	"Rettaikili"	Gangai Amaran	Ilaiyaraaja, K. S. Chithra	5:07
4.	"Vatti Edutha"	Vaali	Ilaiyaraaja, K. S. Chithra	4:39
5.	"Kalyanam"	Gangai Amaran	S. N. Surendar, Malaysia Vasudevan
Total length:				23:51

== Reception ==
NKS of The Indian Express wrote, "The film comes as a flashback, the climax contrasting with the overall placidity of the narrative". Jayamanmadhan for Kalki praised Revathi's acting, Goundamani's humour and Ilaiyaraaja's music but panned Ramarajan's acting, Selvakumar's dialogues and dried second half. Jayamanmadhan concluded that Rangaraj has half built a home without any decorations but questioned who will settle.
