= Lingesh =

Actor in Tamil Film Industry

- Other name: Lijeesh
- Education: Loyola College, Tamil Nadu
- Occupations: Actor, executive producer

Lingesh, also credited as Lijeesh, is an Indian actor who has worked in the Tamil film industry.

== Career ==
Lingesh was born on 26 December in Thiruporur, Tamil Nadu. He did his schooling at Thiruporur Govt Higher Secondary School, before joining Loyola College for his undergraduate degree and went on to do a postgraduate course at the Madras Christian College. With a strong desire to build a career in the visual medium, he joined as an assistant director to director Kavitha Barathy, notably working on the television series Salanam in 2003. During the mid-2000s, Lingesh anchored shows on the Sun Network, Zee Tamil, and Vendhar TV, while working as an RJ in Suryan FM, while attempting to break into acting. He also worked as an event host, notably compering promotional events of films such as Padikkadavan (2008) and Kanthaswamy (2009).

Lingesh was first selected to play the lead role in Balaji Sakthivel's coming-of-age drama Kalloori (2007) opposite Tamannaah, but was later dropped in favour of fellow debutant Akhil, who wanted a more rural-looking actor. Lingesh eventually debuted as an actor in I. Ahmed's Endrendrum Punnagai in a supporting role, before associating with Pa. Ranjith on his critically acclaimed Madras (2014), playing the role of Lijeesh. The name became interchangeably used as his stagename, as he was able to secure another role in Ranjith's Kabali (2016) featuring Rajinikanth. For the role, he put on over ten kilograms for the role.

He starred in Nelson Venkatesan’s Oru Naal Koothu (2016) and appeared in a significant role in Pariyerum Perumal (2018). Following this he acted in films including Gajinikanth (2017), Jada (2019), Irandam Ulagaporin Kadaisi Gundu (2019), V1 (2019) and Taanakkaran (2022).

Lingesh first worked as the protagonist on the social drama College Road (2022), and will next be seen in Kaayal (2025) opposite Gayathrie and Swagatha Krishnan.

== Filmography ==
Year	Film	Role	Notes
2013	Endrendrum Punnagai	Drunkard	
2014	Madras	Lijeesh	
2016	Kabali	Seeni	
2016	Oru Naal Koothu	Baskar	
2018	Pariyerum Perumal	Sankaralingam	
2018	Gajinikanth	Ajay	
2019	Jada	Aravind	
2019	Irandam Ulagaporin Kadaisi Gundu	Shankar	
2019	V1	Inba	
2022	Taanakkaran	Arivu's friend	
2022	College Road	Ajay	
2025	En Kadhale		
2025	Kaayal	Aadhi Tamizh	
2026	The Grand Master		
