= Ondimuniyum Nallapadanum =

Indian Tamil-language drama film

- Theatrical release poster
- Directed by: Sugavanam R
- Produced by: Ka. Karuppusamy
- Starring: Parotta Murugesan; Vijayan Diya; Vidhya Sakthivel
- Cinematography: J. T. Vimal
- Edited by: Sathish Kurosaw
- Music by: Natarajan Sankaran
- Production company: Thirumalai Productions
- Release date: 28 November 2025
- Country: India
- Language: Tamil

Ondimuniyum Nallapadanum is a 2025 Indian Tamil-language drama film directed by Sugavanam R and produced by Ka. Karuppusamy. The film features Parotta Murugesan, Vijayan Diya, and Vidhya Sakthivel in the lead roles, alongside Chitra Nagarajan, Lollu Saba Vikadan, M. Karthikesan, Veppadai Murugan, and Nakkalites Meena in supporting roles. The music is composed by Natarajan Sankaran, with cinematography by J. T. Vimal and sound design by Hari Prasad.

== Cast ==
- Parotta Murugesan
- Vijayan Diya
- Vidhya Sakthivel
- Chitra Nagarajan
- Lollu Saba Vikadan
- M. Karthikesan
- Veppadai Murugan
- Nakkalites Meena

== Reception ==
Roopa Radhakrishnan of The Times of India gave 2.5/5 stars and wrote "The makers fail to properly establish the rest of the characters, other than Nallapadan. [...] The characters are mostly written as one-dimensional. [...] As a result, the world-building and the stakes aren’t fully realised, and the film ends up becoming a shallow attempt." Prashanth Vallavan of Cinema Express gave 2/5 stars and wrote "OMNP is meandering, indulgent, melodramatic, and amateurish. [...] OMNP handles every one of the layers with the dexterity of a child designing a rocket engine with a box of crayons." The film was also reviewed by Dina Thanthi, Hindu Tamil Thisai and Vikatan.
