= Yaaru Potta Kodu =

Indian Tamil-language film

- Theatrical release poster
- Directed by: Lenin Vadamalai
- Produced by: Dr. Vinitha Govindarajan
- Starring: S. M. Prabakaran; Meghali Meenakshi
- Cinematography: John V. Jerin
- Edited by: Sriram Vignesh M
- Music by: Esaikkavingar Soundaryan; Jaikumar Natarajan
- Release date: 12 December 2025
- Country: India
- Language: Tamil

Yaaru Potta Kodu (transl. A line drawn by whom?) is a 2025 Indian Tamil-language film directed by Lenin Vadamalai. The film is produced by Dr. Vinitha Govindarajan and features S. M. Prabakaran and Meghali Meenakshi in the lead roles.

The film was theatrical released on 12 December 2025.

== Cast ==
- S. M. Prabakaran
- Meghali Meenakshi
- Lenin Vadamalai
- Tuhin Che Guevara
- Oviyan S
- Vijay Aditiyaa
- Somasundaram
- Medhaguru Raja
- Madhu Baskar
- Shalini

== Production ==
The film was directed by Lenin Vadamalai and produced by Dr. Vinitha Govindarajan. Cinematography was handled by John V. Jerin, and editing by Sriram Vignesh M. The music for the film was composed by Esaikkavingar Soundaryan and Jaikumar Natarajan.

== Reception ==
Maalai Malar stated that Lenin Vadamalai directed the film to highlight Indian caste discrimination and superstition.

Dinakaran wrote that the film emphasizes the need for student activism in politics.
