= Desingu Raja 2 =

2025 Tamil film by S. Ezhil

- Theatrical release poster
- Directed by: S. Ezhil
- Written by: S. Ezhil
- Produced by: P. Ravichandran
- Starring: Vimal; Jana Nathan; Pujita Ponnada
- Cinematography: Selva R
- Edited by: Anand Linga Kumar
- Music by: Vidyasagar
- Production company: Infinity Creations
- Release date: 11 July 2025
- Running time: 126 minutes
- Country: India
- Language: Tamil

Desingu Raja 2 is a 2025 Indian Tamil-language action comedy film written and directed by S. Ezhil. The film is produced by P. Ravichandran under the banner Infinity Creations. It is a namesake sequel to the 2013 film Desingu Raja, starring Vimal and Jana Nathan in the lead, alongside Pujita Ponnada and Harshitha as the female leads.

Desingu Raja 2 released on 11 July 2025 to negative reviews from both critics and audiences as well.

== Plot ==
The plot here chronicles the journey of three friends who on their individual pursuits after college, cross paths again. The story takes a turn when the trio get entangled in the affairs of Natarajan, a politician whose son had been murdered and who was yearning for revenge against his party chiefs.

== Cast ==
- Vimal as Inspector Kulasekara Pandian
- Jana Nathan as Sathya
- Pujita Ponnada as DCP Chandralekha
- Harshitha Bandlamuri as Geetha
- Ravi Mariya as Minister Nangooram
- Robo Shankar as Vijay
- Singampuli as Arjun
- Redin Kingsley as Sundar
- Sha Ra as Idea Velu
- Pugazh as Inspector Varnajalam
- Rajendran as Dinesh
- Chaams as Pulipandi
- Vaiyapuri as Krishna
- Swaminathan as Vijaya
- Madurai Muthu as Shiva
- John Vijay as Singaram
- Jangiri Madhumitha as Shalini
- Bava Lakshmanan as Abhishek
- Kottachi as Bhai
- Raghu Babu as Gang Leader Veera Babu
- KPY Vinoth as Ravi
- R. V. Udayakumar as Chief Minister
- Kadhal Sukumar as Jayaraman
- Ashvin Raja as Lottai
- Sneha Gupta in a special appearance

== Production ==
In mid-January 2024, S. Ezhil officially confirmed that his 2013 film, Desingu Raja is set to have a sequel, with Vimal reprising his role as the male lead, alongside Pujita Ponnada and Harshitha as the female leads. Apart from the lead cast, the film includes an ensemble cast consisting of Jana Nathan, Ravi Mariya, Robo Shankar, Singampuli, Redin Kingsley, Pugazh, Rajendran, Chaams, Vaiyapuri, Swaminathan, Madurai Muthu, Jangiri Madhumitha, Vijay TV Vinoth and others in important roles. The pre-release first-look release event was conducted in Chennai on 28 January 2024.

The film is produced by P. Ravichandran under the banner Infinity Creations, while the technical team consists of music composer Vidyasagar, cinematographer Selva R, editor Anand Linga Kumar, art director Siva Sankar and stunt choreographer Fire Karthik. Principal photography had commenced even before the announcement of the film in mid-January 2024. During the second schedule, Sneha Gupta joined the shooting for a special appearance in a song, which was shot in a lavish set erected in East Coast Road, Chennai. Filming got wrapped by the end of June 2024.

== Music ==
Desingu Raja 2

Soundtrack album by Vidyasagar
- Studio: Varsha Vallaki Studios
- Genre: Feature film soundtrack
- Language: Tamil
- Label: MRT Music
- Producer: Vidyasagar

Vidyasagar chronology
Marivillin Gopurangal (2024)	Desingu Raja 2 (2025)

Singles from Desingu Raja 2
- 1. "Pidaari Kovil Thoppu" Released: 11 June 2025

External audio
- Desinguraja 2 Audio Jukebox on YouTube

The film has music composed by Vidyasagar in his second collaboration with Ezhil after Poovellam Un Vaasam (2001). The first single "Pidaari Kovil Thoppu" was released on 11 June 2025.

Track listing
No.	Title	Lyrics	Singer(s)	Length
1.	"Pidaari Kovil Thoppu"	Yugabharathi	Vidyasagar, Vrusha Balu	3:58
2.	"Yaaru Petha"	Vivek	Harshavardhan, Rakshita Suresh	2:46
3.	"Doli Dankana"	Super Subu	Jithin Raj, M. M. Manasi	3:48
4.	"Nila Malai"	Vivek	Sathyaprakash	3:19
5.	"Komali Koodaram"	Vivek	KJ Iyenar, Vrusha Balu	2:30

== Release ==
Desingu Raja 2 released on 11 July 2025.

=== Home media ===
Mask Studios and Tentkotta Speaking about the OTT release of the movie, the date of release and the releasing partner are not yet revealed.

== Reception ==
Rohini M of Cinema Express gave 2/5 stars and wrote "Ezhil’s films are typically known for their light-hearted fun and humour, but here, you find yourself searching for the comedy right from the beginning. The entire film feels like an exaggerated school play filled with overacting and chaos." Abhinav Subramanian of The Times of India gave 1.5/5 stars and wrote "Director Ezhil unleashes a relentless barrage of gags that land with the grace of a drunk elephant, each one more cringe-inducing than the last. The film looks like it time-traveled from some alternate universe where comedy evolved differently, and badly."
