= Naruvee =

Indian Tamil-language horror thriller film

- Theatrical release poster
- Directed by: Subarak M
- Written by: Subarak M
- Produced by: A. Alagu Pandian
- Cinematography: Anand Rajendran
- Edited by: Subarak M
- Music by: Ashwath
- Production company: Harish Cinemas
- Distributed by: Baskar Cinema Company; Sivaani Studios
- Release date: 29 August 2025
- Country: India
- Language: Tamil

Naruvee is a 2025 Indian Tamil-language horror thriller film written and directed by Subarak M. Produced by A. Alagu Pandian under the banner of Harish Cinemas, the film features Harish Alag, Vinchu Rachel Sam, Chatherin Varuna, Panine Kumar, and VJ Pappu in the lead roles. The cinematography is handled by Anand Rajendran, with editing by Subarak M and music composed by Ashwath. The stunt choreography is done by Jesudas Manoharan. It is distributed by Baskar Cinema Company and Sivaani Studios.

The film was theatrically released on 29 August 2025.

== Cast ==
- Harish Alag
- Vinchu Rachel Sam
- Chatherin Varuna
- Padine Kumar
- VJ Pappu

== Production ==
The film is written and directed by Subarak Mubarak. It is produced by A. Alagu Pandian under Harish Cinemas. Anand Rajendran served as the cinematographer, while Subarak Mubarak also handled the editing. Music was composed by Ashwath, and stunt sequences were choreographed by Jesudas Manoharan.

== Release ==
The film is scheduled to be released on 29 August 2025.

== Reception ==
Dina Thanthi critic stated that director M. Subarak has captured attention by presenting various social issues in an enjoyable suspense-thriller style. Abhinav Subramanian of Times of India gave 2/5 stars and wrote that "The film leaves you with a purpose to think about, even if the journey to get there is a struggle."
