= Pujita Ponnada =

Indian actress

- Born: 5 October 1991 (age 34); Visakhapatnam, Andhra Pradesh, India
- Education: B.Tech
- Occupations: Actress; model

Pujita Ponnada is an Indian actress and model who predominantly works in Telugu and Tamil cinema. She is principally noted for her roles in the films Rangasthalam (2018) and Kalki (2019).

== Early life ==
Pujita Ponnada was born into a Telugu family in Visakhapatnam and raised in Chennai.

== Career ==
Pujita Ponnada worked as a software engineer in Tata Consultancy Services before she started her acting career with short films.

Pujita Ponnada played roles in films like Oopiri (2016), Rangasthalam (2018), Happy Wedding (2018), Brand Babu (2018) and Where Is the Venkatalakshmi (2019). Her release Seven (2019) was touted to be an investigative thriller revolving seven characters; the Tamil-Telugu bilingual had six heroines. Pujita Ponnada played the female lead in the Telugu romantic drama film, Aakasa Veedhullo (2022). Then, she continued to act in Tamil films, Jolly O Gymkhana (2024), Konjam Kadhal Konjam Modhal (2025), Desingu Raja 2 (2025) and Padaiyaanda Maaveeraa (2025).

== Filmography ==
Key
†	Denotes films that have not yet been released

=== Feature films ===
Year	Title	Role	Language	Notes
2016	Oopiri	Gallery manager	Telugu	Bilingual film; Debut in both languages
2016	Thozha	Gallery manager	Tamil	Bilingual film; Debut in both languages
2016	Premam	College student	Telugu	
2017	Darsakudu	Sailu	Telugu	
2018	Rangasthalam	Padma	Telugu	
2018	Raju Gadu	Vennela	Telugu	
2018	Happy Wedding	Laveena	Telugu	
2018	Brand Babu	Pavani	Telugu	
2019	Where Is the Venkatalakshmi	Gowri	Telugu	
2019	Seven	Bhanu	Telugu	Bilingual film
2019	Seven	Bhanu	Tamil	Bilingual film
2019	Kalki	SI Palapitta	Telugu	
2020	Run	Shruti	Telugu	Debut as Lead actress in Telugu; Aha film
2020	Miss India	Padma Naina	Telugu	Released on Netflix
2021	Money She	Madhu	Telugu	
2022	Katha Kanchiki Manam Intiki	Deeksha	Telugu	
2022	Odela Railway Station	Spoorthi	Telugu	Released on Aha
2022	Aakasa Veedhullo	Nisha	Telugu	
2023	Ravanasura	SI Ruhana	Telugu	
2023	Jorugaa Husharugaa	Nitya	Telugu	
2024	Jolly O Gymkhana	Kanniga	Tamil	Debut as Lead Actress in Tamil
2025	Konjam Kadhal Konjam Modhal	Vaisali	Tamil	
2025	Desingu Raja 2	Chandralekha	Tamil	
2025	Hari Hara Veera Mallu	Jalaja	Telugu	Cameo appearance in the song "Kollagottinadhiro"
2025	Padaiyaanda Maaveeraa	Guru's wife	Tamil	
2026	Yogi Da	Mallika	Tamil	
TBA	Bhagavan†	TBA	Tamil	Filming

=== Short films ===
- Pseudocide (2015)
- Upma Tinesindi (2015)
- Unspoken (2015)
- Boochi (2016)
- Parichayam (2016)
- Radha Krishna (2016)
- A Saturday Evening (2016)
- Deepika Padukone (2018)
- Parinayam (2019)

=== Television ===
Year	Title	Role	Network	Notes	Ref
2015	Real Detectives	Pujita	ETV		
2024	Harikatha	Lisa	Disney+ Hotstar		
2025	Katha Sudha	Chinni & Young Tulasi	ETV Win	under segment "Uttaram"; Dual role	
