= Vengayam =

2011 Tamil-language film

- Poster
- Directed by: Sankagiri Rajkumar
- Written by: Sankagiri Rajkumar
- Produced by: Manickam S.M.
- Starring: Alexander Soundarrajan; Pavina
- Music by: Songs; Bharani; Score: Ram Sasi
- Production company: Poovappa Kalaikoodam
- Release date: 19 August 2011
- Country: India
- Language: Tamil

Vengayam (transl. Onion) is a 2011 Indian Tamil language film written and directed by Sankagiri Rajkumar. The film stars Alexander Soundarrajan and Pavina in the lead roles. The music was composed by Bharani and cinematography performed by Rahu.

Vengayam was released on 19 August 2011 and underperformed at the box office due to its low profile release. It was re-released on 23 March 2012 by Cheran, and received much more attention. The film's making was documented in Rajkumar's next film Bioscope (2025).

== Plot ==
The film revolves around fake godmen in a village.

== Cast ==
- Soundarrajan as Anbumani
- Pavina as Tamil
- Sankagiri Rajkumar as Raju
- Eazhaventhan as Tantric
- Thangaraj as Astrologer
- Azhagappan
- Kalki
- Vellaiammal as Fake godman
- Sathyaraj as himself (guest appearance)

== Soundtrack ==
The songs were composed by Bharani.

Title	Lyrics	Singer(s)
"Adada Ivan"	Sankagiri Rajkumar	Sivamani
"Salangai"	S. M. Manickam	Pushpavanam Kuppusamy
"Achamenna Achamenna Aasai Thamizhey"	Suba Veerapandian	Ram Sasi
"Ara Kirukkan"	Arivumathi	Suchith Suresan, Srimathumitha
"Megame Ven Megame"	Arivumathi	Bellie Raj, Deepa Miriam

== Reception ==
The film was critically acclaimed but failed commercially. Sify said, "Vengayam works as the story is taken from real life incidents and packaged as a rural entertainer which has humour, romance and sentiments [...] The hero and heroine look and behave like villagers and music of Bharani is apt" . The New Indian Express wrote, "The dialogue pithy and starkly realistic is a key strength to the film [...] Contemporary, provocative and engaging, ‘Vengayam’ is a film, worth a watch.

Reviewing the film during its 2012 rerelease, The Times of India wrote, "The film pretty much follows the formula of vigilante films but brings a couple of new things to the table — for one, the protagonists are hardly ones you would expect in such a film."
