= En Kadhale =

2025 Indian Tamil-language romantic drama film

- Theatrical release poster
- Directed by: Jayalakshmi
- Written by: Jayalakshmi
- Produced by: Jayalakshmi
- Starring: Lingesh; Katpadi Rajan; Divya Thomas
- Cinematography: Tonychan; Venkatesh
- Edited by: Gopi Krishna; Ranjith
- Music by: Sandy Sandellow
- Production company: Skywanders Entertainment
- Release date: 9 May 2025
- Country: India
- Language: Tamil

En Kadhale (transl. My Love) is a 2025 Indian Tamil-language romantic drama film written and directed by Jayalakshmi and produced by Jayalakshmi under the banner of Skywanders Entertainment. The film features Lingesh, Katpadi Rajan, Divya Thomas, Leah Wells, and Kanja Karuppu in prominent roles. It was released theatrically on 9 May 2025.

== Cast ==
- Lingesh as Dheena
- Katpadi Rajan
- Divya Thomas as Dhanalakshmi
- Leah Wells as Helen
- Madhusudhan Rao
- Maaran
- Kanja Karuppu
- Dharsan

== Production ==
En Kadhale is produced by Jayalakshmi under the banner of Skywanders Entertainment. The film's music is composed by Sandy Sandellow, with cinematography handled by Tonychan and Venkatesh, and editing by Gopi Krishna and Ranjith.

== Release ==
En Kadhale was released theatrically on 9 May 2025.

== Reception ==
Sreejith Mullappilly of Cinema Express rated the film 2.5/5 stars and wrote, "Ultimately, En Kadhale presents a sprawling narrative with both moments of insightful storytelling and stretches of conventional melodrama." Abhinav Subramanian of The Times of India gave 1.5/5 stars and wrote "While the premise of a cross-cultural romance in a fishing village holds promise, En Kadhale's conventional approach leaves room for more creativity. It’s a predictable journey that, unfortunately, offers very little reason to stay aboard." Dina Thanthi critic stated that "Jayalakshmi draws attention by directing the film as a love triangle story, weaving the feelings of two different women together in the screenplay." Dinakaran critic gave a mixed review.
