= Murmur (2025 film) =

Indian Tamil-language found footage horror film

- Theatrical release poster
- Directed by: Hemnath Narayanan
- Written by: Hemnath Narayanan
- Produced by: Prabakaran .S
- Starring: Richie Kapoor; Devaraj Arumugam; Suganya Shanmugam; Yuvikha Rajendran; Aria Selvaraj
- Cinematography: Jason Williams
- Edited by: Rohith.V
- Production companies: Spk Pictures Private Limited; Stand Alone Pictures International Private Limited.
- Release date: 7 March 2025
- Country: India
- Language: Tamil

Murmur is a 2025 Indian Tamil-language found footage horror film written and directed by Hemnath Narayanan. The film stars Richie Kapoor and Devaraj Arumugam in the lead roles, alongside Yuvikha Rajendran, Suganya Shanmugam and Aria Selvaraj. The film was produced by Prabakaran S. under the banner of Spk Pictures Private Limited, and Stand Alone Pictures International Private Limited. The film was released on 7 March 2025 to mixed reviews.

== Plot ==
A group of Chennai-based Paranormal YouTubers ventures into a cursed forest in Javvadhu Hills in search of "Seven Saptha Kannigal" and the cursed spirit to record the real time paranormal experiences inside the cursed forest and got lost. Then The police force entered into the forest in search of YouTubers but they only found their broken cameras with the paranormal recordings, and that recorded footage forms the film's storyline.

== Cast ==
- Devaraj Arumugam as Melvin
- Richie Kapoor as Rishi
- Suganya Shanmugam as Ankitha
- Aria Selvaraj as Jenifer
- Yuvikha Rajendran as Kaantha
- Parkavi Prabakaran as Villager
- Mangai Arasi as Sungupaati
- Rajkumar as Villager
- Ananadhan as Villager
- Navaneela Ray as Villager
- Yuva Shree Shanmugam
- Humera
- Arjun
- Harish Kumar
- Revathi Dharan

== Production ==
The film is written and directed by Hemnath Narayanan. Jason Williams is the cinematographer, editing is done by Rohith V. and Kewyn Frederick is the sound designer.

== Release ==
=== Streaming rights ===
The streaming rights of this movie were acquired by Lionsgate Play and Amazon Prime Video on 17 April 2025.

== Reception ==
Abhinav Subramanian of The Times of India gave 2.5/5 stars and wrote "Watching Murmur feels like sitting through someone’s endless vacation footage – if their holiday destination happened to be a cursed forest with an invisible ghoul. This pioneering attempt at horror told entirely through character-operated cameras deserves recognition for its ambition, but delivers more monotony than menace." Ashwin S of Cinema Express rated two point five out of five star and wrote that "A good horror film sets itself up well and delivers a knockout punch—Murmur lacks the latter but still has much to admire." Maalai Malar critic gave three out of five star and noted that "Unlike the usual ghost films, he has shown a difference in this one. What is special is that it is shot using scenes recorded directly on camera".
