= Saa Vee =

- Theatrical release poster
- Directed by: Anton Ajith
- Written by: Anton Ajith
- Produced by: Anton Ajith
- Starring: Udhaya Deep; Aadesh Bala; Aashika; Ratchasan Yasar
- Cinematography: Boopathi Venkatachalam
- Edited by: Sundar S.
- Music by: Tuners
- Production company: Anton Ajith Productions
- Distributed by: Sivaani Studios
- Release date: 5 December 2025
- Running time: 105 minutes
- Country: India
- Language: Tamil

Saa Vee (short for Saavu Veedu; transl. Mourning house) is a 2025 Indian Tamil-language black comedy thriller film written, directed, and produced by Anton Ajith. It stars Udhaya Deep, Aadesh Bala, Aashika, and Ratchasan Yasar. The film was theatrically released on 5 December 2025.

== Cast ==
- Udhaya Deep as Jude Marimuthu
- Aadesh Bala as the police officer
- Aashika
- Ratchasan Yasar
- Master Ajay
- Kavitha Suresh as Stella
- Pream K. Seshadri

== Production ==
Saa Vee was written, directed, and produced by Anton Ajith under Anton Ajith Productions. Cinematography was handled by Boopathi Venkatachalam, while editing was carried out by Sundar S. The music was composed by Tuners, and the stunt choreography was handled by Sharp Sankar.

== Release and reception ==
Saa Vee was released theatrically on 5 December 2025. Saravanan of Maalai Malar appreciated Udhaya Deep's natural acting and Boopathi's cinematography but felt the screenplay was somewhat incomprehensible. Dina Thanthi too appreciated Udhaya Deep's performance, in addition to the cinematography and music. Dinamalar reviewed the film less positively, feeling Udhaya Deep's acting was only okay, Aadesh Bala was too loud and the cinematography suffered due to the low budget. Minnambalam said the script was so confusing they could not tell whether it was a comedy or serious film.
