= Kaayal (film) =

2025 Indian Tamil-language drama film

- Theatrical release poster
- Directed by: Dhamayanthi
- Written by: Dhamayanthi
- Produced by: Jesu Sundaramaran
- Starring: Lingesh; Gayathrie Shankar; Anumol; Ramesh Thilak
- Cinematography: Karthick Subramanian
- Edited by: B. Pravin Baaskar
- Music by: Justin Khenaniah
- Production company: J Studios
- Release date: 12 September 2025
- Country: India
- Language: Tamil

Kaayal is a 2025 Indian Tamil-language drama film written and directed by Dhamayanthi. Produced by Jesu Sundaramaran under the banner J Studios, the film stars Lingesh, Gayathrie Shankar, Anumol, Ramesh Thilak, Swagatha Krishnan, Issac Varghese, and Bharath. The cinematography is handled by Karthick Subramanian, editing by B. Pravin Baaskar, and music composed by Justin Khenaniah. The film was released in theatres on 12 September 2025.

== Cast ==
- Lingesh as Aadhi Tamizh
- Gayathrie Shankar as Thenmozhi "Thenu"
- Anumol as Yamuna
- Ramesh Thilak as Sridhar
- Swagatha Krishnan
- Issac Varghese as Ilangovan
- Bharath

== Production ==
Announced in mid-May 2021, the film is written and directed by journalist-turned-director Dhamayanthi starring Lingesh, Gayathrie Shankar, and Swagatha Krishnan in the lead roles, alongside Anumol, Ramesh Thilak, Issac Varghese, and Bharath in important roles. The film is produced by Jesu Sundaramaran under J Studios and was extensively shot in coastal areas such as Pondicherry, Nagapattinam, Velankanni and Rameswaram. Karthick Subramanian handled the cinematography, while B. Pravin Baaskar served as the editor. Music is composed by Justin Khenaniah.

== Release and reception ==
The film released in theatres on 12 September 2025. Abhinav Subramanian of The Times of India gave 2.5/5 stars and wrote "Kaayal keeps the death offscreen, refuses sensationalism, and resists tidy absolution. It is sincere and thoughtfully performed. The feeling is true; the telling could have used a livelier pulse." Thirai Bharathi of Hindu Tamil Thisai reviewed positively by praising the story and the performances of the lead cast. Maalai Malar gave 2.5/5 stars by praising the performance of the lead cast, especially, Lingesh, Gayathri and Ramesh Thilak and also praising the music, while criticizing the screenplay.
