= Meeladun Nabi =

Indian Tamil-language documentary film

- Official release poster
- Directed by: Millat Ahmad
- Written by: Millat Ahmad
- Produced by: Millat Ahmad
- Starring: Millat Ahmad; Imam M. S. Abdul Qaiyoom Baqavi; Imam S. M. S. Umar Rilvanullah Jamali; Imam A. S. Sadakkathulla Baqavi
- Cinematography: Lalith Raghavendar, Millat Ahmad
- Edited by: Lalith Raghavendar
- Music by: S. R. Ram
- Production company: ZEE6 Movies
- Release date: 31 October 2025
- Country: India
- Language: Tamil

Meeladun Nabi is a 2025 Indian Tamil-language documentary film written and directed by Millat Ahmad. The film is produced by Millat Ahmad under the banner ZEE6 Movies. It features Millat Ahmad along with Imam M. S. Abdul Qaiyoom Baqavi, Imam S. M. S. Umar Rilvanullah Jamali, Imam A. S. Sadakkathulla Baqavi, Rahema Begum, Naushad Hanifa, Samsudeen, and Faridha. The documentary was released on 31 October 2025.

== Plot ==
The documentary offers a comprehensive and accessible exploration of the life of Prophet Muhammad, beginning with the significant events of the Year of the Elephant, the year of his birth. The narrative is uniquely structured into chapters, guided by the scholarly insights of three prominent Imams who appear on screen to provide historical and spiritual context.

Moving away from traditional documentary styles, the film employs Artificial Intelligence (AI) generated visuals to bring historical milestones to life, creating an immersive experience for the audience. The storytelling is further enriched by renowned singers whose performances serve as a lyrical bridge between the historical chapters. Designed to be both educational and engaging, this two-hour feature simplifies the Prophet’s life story, making it easy to understand for audiences of all backgrounds while maintaining the depth of his legacy.

== Cast ==
- Millat Ahmad
- Imam M. S. Abdul Qaiyoom Baqavi
- Imam S. M. S. Umar Rilvanullah Jamali
- Imam A. S. Sadakkathulla Baqavi
- Rahema Begum
- Naushad Hanifa
- Samsudeen
- Faridha

== Production ==
The film is written and directed by Millat Ahmad, who also serves as the producer under ZEE6 Movies. Cinematography is handled by Lalith Raghavendar and Millat Ahmad, while editing is done by Lalith Raghavendar. The music for the project is composed by S. R. Ram.

== Reception ==
Dinakaran wrote that the film will help Muslims gain a greater understanding of their religion and people of other religions get acquainted with Islam. Maalai Malar stated that Millat Ahmad has directed the film to help Muslims gain a deeper understanding of their religion and to give people of other religions a simple introduction.
