= Udhaya Deep =

Indian actor

- Other name: Udayaraj
- Occupation: Actor
- Notable work: Nila Kaalam (2001)

Udhaya Deep (formerly Udayaraj) is an Indian actor who is famous for his stint as a child actor in Tamil films. He is known for his role in Nila Kaalam (2001).

== Career ==
After acting in several films as a child actor, Udayaraj rose to fame for his role as Pulli in the television film Nila Kaalam (2001). His role was appreciated by critics with one critic from The Hindu noting that "Udayaraj as Pulli hogs the limelight" and how "He has absolutely no inhibition and is a natural". He was awarded the National Film Award for Best Child Artist for his role in the film. Udayaraj also starred in Thiruda Thirudi (2003) and is seen ripping a poster in a comedic sequence featuring Karunas. Udayaraj played one of Vijay's friends in Thirumalai (2003). He played the titular character in the Malayalam film Oliver Twist (2007). In 2010, he made his adult acting debut with Baana Kaathadi portraying one of Atharvaa's friends. After the film, he went to work on STAR Vijay's Kalakka Povathu Yaaru as an assistant director. He played one of the leads in the low-budget Vandha Mala starring Sri Priyanka. He is set to star in an untitled film starring Ram Nishanth.

== Personal life ==
He married Janani Nivitha in May 2018. They have a daughter.

== Filmography ==
- All films are in Tamil, unless otherwise noted.

Key
†	Denotes films that have not yet been released

Year	Film	Role	Notes
1993	Karuppu Vellai		
1994	Veeramani	Kannan	
1995	Thaikulame Thaikulame	Arun (Japan)	Uncredited role
1996	Coimbatore Mappillai	young Balu	
2000	Koodi Vazhnthal Kodi Nanmai	Boxer Krishnan's son	
2000	Doubles	Vivek's son	
2000	Kannukku Kannaga	Vijay's friend	
2001	Nila Kaalam	Pulli (Balasubramaniam)	Won—National Film Award for Best Child Artist
2001	Citizen	Young Arivanandham	
2001	Lovely	Nivedha's brother	
2001	Chocklet	Sasi's son	
2001	12B	Wall Tube	
2002	Bala	Jayamani's son	
2003	Thiruda Thirudi	Naughty boy	
2003	Winner	Boy on bicycle	
2003	Thirumalai	Suma	
2003	Soori	Black ticket seller	
2004	Thendral	Killi Vallavan's bully	Uncredited role
2005	Dancer	Kutty's friend	
2006	Theenda Theenda	Vandu	
2007	Oliver Twist	Oliver Twist	Malayalam film
2007	Veerappu	young Pulippandi	
2010	Baana Kaathadi	Ramesh's friend	
2015	Vandha Mala		
2018	Vinai Ariyar		
2019	Kaithi	College student	
2021	Master	Prisoner	
2022	Gulu Gulu		
2022	Naan Mirugamaai Maara	Henchman	
2023	Asvins	Rahul	
2025	Saa Vee		

== Television ==
Year	Title	Role(s)	Platform	Notes
1997-1998	Marmadesam - Vidathu Karuppu	Mittai Mani	Sun TV	
2000-2003	Veetuku Veedu Looty		Jaya TV	
2006	Kana Kaanum Kaalangal season 1	A Mechanic	Star Vijay	
2007-2012	Vasantham		Sun TV	
2018	Vella Raja	A Drug Peddler	Amazon Prime Video	
2023	Dance Jodi Dance Reloaded Season 2	Contestant	Zee Tamil	
2024	Goli Soda Rising	Settu	Disney+ Hotstar	Replacing Sree Raam
