= Meghali =

Indian actress

- Born: Kolkata, India
- Occupations: Actress, model
- Years active: 2015–present

Meghali Meenakshi is an Indian actress who has appeared in Tamil cinema . She made her Tamil debut in Pa. Vijay's film Aaruthra. The lyricist-cum-actor directed and acted in this venture.

== Career ==
In April 2017, she signed to play a cameo role in Vikram - Tamannaah starrer Sketch.

Meghali's debut film Aaruthra with Pa. Vijay was released. She is already busy with other projects in Kollywood. The actress is now working on a new Tamil film, titled Ragadam; in which she plays a dual role.

She will be playing the lead along with Jackie Shroff in Tamil movie Paandi Muni, directed by Kasthuri Raja.'The film is set against the backdrop of a jameen family, and revolves around Jackie and Meghali's characters; it's a war between the God and the ghost'.

She played lead role in Nirbhoya, a Bengali film directed by Milan Bhowmik and produced by Sanjib Samaddar under the banner of Sambit Media and Productions. This film is based on the 2012 Delhi gang rape case.

== Filmography ==
- All films are in Tamil unless otherwise noted.

Key
†	Denotes films that have not yet been released

Year	Film	Role	Notes
2016	Jithan 2	Anjali	
2018	Sketch	Gayathri	
2018	Aaruthra	Parvati	
2018	Nirbhoya	Nirbhaya	Bengali film
2023	Appatha	Avanti	
2025	Irudhi Muyarchi		
2025	Yaaru Potta Kodu		
