= Konjam Kadhal Konjam Modhal =

2025 Tamil film by K. Rangaraj

- Theatrical release poster
- Directed by: K. Rangaraj
- Written by: K. Rangaraj
- Produced by: My India Manickam
- Starring: Srikanth; Pujita Ponnada
- Cinematography: Dhamodharan
- Edited by: Kay Kay
- Music by: R. K. Sundar
- Production company: Sri Ganapathi Films
- Release date: 14 March 2025
- Country: India
- Language: Tamil

Konjam Kadhal Konjam Modhal (transl. A little love, a little clash) is a 2025 Indian Tamil-language romantic comedy film written and directed by K. Rangaraj and produced by My India Manickam under his Sri Ganapathi Films production banner, starring Srikanth and Pujita Ponnada in the lead roles. It was released in theatres on 14 March 2025.

== Plot ==
Srikanth works as a horse trainer on the estate of businessman Bhargav, while Pujitha Ponnada works for a millionaire named Sachu. One day, Pujitha falls in love with Srikanth, mistaking him for a businessman; believing Pujitha to be wealthy, Srikanth is also captivated. Just as they are preparing for their wedding and have become engaged, the truth comes to light; following an argument, they call off the wedding and part ways.

== Cast ==
- Srikanth as Karthik
- Pujita Ponnada as Vaisali
- Bharathan as Rajasekhar
- Nimi Immanuel as Chithra
- Bhargav as Sridhar Chelliah
- Singampuli as Santhanam
- Nambirajan as Himself
- K. R. Vijaya as Maha
- Delhi Ganesh as Maha's husband
- Sachu as Jaanu
- Ramesh Khanna as Karthik's father
- Sujatha Sivakumar as Karthik's mother
- Vinodhini Vaidyanathan as Karthik's sister
- Chaams as Karthik's uncle
- Nalini as Sarassu
- Anu Mohan as Sarassu's husband
- Kaviyarasan
- Master Vishnava

== Production ==
The film is directed by K. Rangaraj who made his comeback in directing a film after a period of 30 years. Principal photography took place in Chennai and Kodaikanal.

The film is produced by My India Manickam under his Sri Ganapathi Films production banner and the technical team consists of Dhamodharan as the cinematographer and R. K. Sundar as the music composer.

== Release and reception ==
Konjam Kadhal Konjam Modhal released in theatres on 14 March 2025. A critic of Dinamalar rated the film 2.25/5 and heavily criticised the dialogues, screenplay, and the background score. A critic of Maalai Malar rated the film 2/5 and praised the performances of the supporting cast while criticising the clichéd story, cinematography, songs and the background score. A critic of News Today reviewed the film more positively, calling it "a meaningful, feel-good film that leaves a lasting impression. It is a must-watch for those who appreciate romance infused with life lessons, making it a poignant and rewarding cinematic experience".
