= K. Rangaraj =

Indian film director

- Occupation: director
- Years active: 1983-2025

K. Rangaraj is an Indian film director and screenwriter and producer who was active in Tamil cinema mainly in the 1980s.

== Career ==
Rangaraj was born in a village near Kovilpatti. While searching for job in Chennai, he decided to join Tamil film industry after being influenced by films directed by K. Balachander. He struck friendship with M. G. Vallabhan who introduced him to Bharathiraja. Rangaraj who went to assist Bharathiraja in various films made his directorial debut with Nenjamellam Nee in 1983. The film became successful and Rangaraj went on to direct successful films like Unnai Naan Santhithen (1984), Udaya Geetham (1985), Geethanjali (1985) and Paadu Nilave (1987). However subsequent failures like Dharmam Vellum (1989) and Ellaichami (1992) (1992) which he also produced led him in a financial crunch which also led him to leave films completely and directed serials for sometime. After a gap of 31 years, he made his comeback as director with Konjam Kadhal Konjam Modhal with Srikanth.

== Filmography ==
Films

- Nenjamellam Neeye (1983)
- Ponnu Pudichirukku (1984)
- Nilavu Suduvathillai (1984)
- Unnai Naan Santhithen (1984)
- Udaya Geetham (1985)
- Geethanjali (1985)
- Amudha Gaanam (1985)
- Uyire Unakkaga (1986); also screenplay credits
- Manithanin Marupakkam (1986)
- Unakkaagave Vaazhgiren (1986)
- Sathya Jyothi (1986; Kannada)
- Paadu Nilave (1987)
- Ninaive Oru Sangeetham (1987)
- Gramatthu Minnal (1987)
- Dharmam Vellum (1989)
- Sivaranjani (1991)
- Ellaichami (1992)
- Konjam Kadhal Konjam Modhal (2025)

Television

- Kudumbam (Sun TV)
- Aarathi (Raj TV)
- Bhandham (Sun TV)
- Mahalakshmi (Sun TV)
