= Bioscope (2025 film) =

Indian comedy drama film

- Theatrical release poster
- Directed by: Sankagiri Rajkumar
- Written by: Sankagiri Rajkumar
- Produced by: Sankagiri Rajkumar
- Starring: Sankagiri Rajkumar; Manickam; Vellayammal; Muththayi
- Cinematography: Murali Ganesh
- Edited by: Sankagiri Rajkumar
- Music by: Taj Noor
- Production company: 25 Dots Creations
- Release date: 3 January 2025
- Running time: 113 minutes
- Country: India
- Language: Tamil

Bioscope: The Story of the Story is a 2025 Indian Tamil-language comedy-drama film written and directed by Sankagiri Rajkumar. The film stars himself, Manickam, Vellayammal and Muththayi. The film was produced by under the banner of 25 Dots Creations.

Bioscope was released in theatres on 3 January 2025.

== Plot ==
The film documents the making of Vengayam (2011) by then-newcomer Sankagiri Rajkumar and his fellow villagers.

== Cast ==
- Sankagiri Rajkumar as Rajkumar
- Vellayammal as Vellayammal
- Cheran as himself (guest appearance)

== Production ==
The film was produced by the director Sankagiri Rajkumar under the banner of 25 Dots Creations. He also handled the cinematography and editing and the music was composed by Taj Noor. Some portions of the film were shot in the United States.

== Release ==
Bioscope: The Story of the Story released in theatres on 3 January 2025.

== Reception ==
=== Critical response ===
Akshay Kumar of Cinema Express gave 3/5 stars and wrote, "Bioscope is one of the rarest films about films that don't end with the protagonist, who is usually a director, punching in the air after an overwhelming response from the audience." Abhinav Subramanian of Times of India gave 2/5 stars and wrote, "Bioscope emerges as a curious paradox: a story about making movie magic that works only partially. Like its characters’ makeshift equipment, it's ingenious in parts, but doesn't quite get the job done."
