= Sabdham =

- Theatrical release poster
- Directed by: Arivazhagan
- Written by: Arivazhagan
- Produced by: Siva; S. Banupriya Siva
- Starring: Aadhi; Lakshmi Menon; Simran; Laila
- Cinematography: Arun Bathmanaban
- Edited by: V. J. Sabu Joseph
- Music by: S. Thaman
- Production companies: 7G Films; AAlpha Frames
- Distributed by: Ayngaran International (Tamil Nadu); Mythri Movie Makers (Nizam); Zee Studios through Inbox Pictures (North India)
- Release date: 28 February 2025
- Running time: 146 minutes
- Country: India
- Language: Tamil

Sabdham (transl. Sound) is a 2025 Indian Tamil language horror thriller film written and directed by Arivazhagan. The film is jointly produced by Siva and S. Banupriya Siva under 7G Films and AAlpha Frames and stars Aadhi and Lakshmi Menon.

The film was announced in December 2022, along with the title of the film. Principal photography commenced the same month in Munnar along with a schedule in Chennai and later in Mumbai and wrapped by late-September 2023. The film has music composed by S. Thaman, cinematography handled by Arun Bathmanaban and editing by V. J. Sabu Joseph.

Sabdham premiered in theaters on February 28, 2025, to mixed reviews from critics with praise for its technical brilliance, sound design, and Thaman's score, but criticism for its screenplay and execution. It performed moderately at the box office.

== Plot ==
Rooban, a paranormal investigator from Mumbai, travels to a medical college in Munnar to investigate a series of mysterious deaths. He meets Dr. Avantika, a lecturer who is writing a thesis to disprove the supernatural as mere psychiatric hallucinations.

Despite her skepticism, Avantika begins experiencing paranormal phenomena firsthand. This peaks during a violent encounter in the old library where she is attacked by spirits in Rooban's presence, leading to her hospitalization. Rooban discovers from a local casket maker that 40 years prior, the church-affiliated college took in 42 disabled orphans. Under the direction of Dr. Diana, the children were subjected to experiments involving the effects of sound on development. All 42 children died under mysterious circumstances and were buried in hidden graves.

Rooban and Avantika discover "Jennifer," a woman kept in a long-term coma. They realize "Jennifer" is actually Diana and that the medical staff, including the students who died, were tasked with keeping her heavily sedated under strange orders. Rooban theorizes that the constant anesthesia has caused Diana to have a prolonged out-of-body experience. He realizes the spirits of the 42 children are not the villains but are actually protecting Diana from those who wish her harm.

The investigation takes a turn when Rooban discovers a connection to black magic. He suspects that Dr. Daniel and his associates have been using occult practices to maintain the cover-up. Anyone who attempts to harm Diana or disconnect her life support—including the dean and the supervising doctor—suffers a gruesome, supernatural death.

Through audio analysis and a book on ultrasound therapy, the truth is revealed: the real culprit is Daniel's wife, Dr. Nancy. Driven by professional jealousy of Diana's success, Nancy used black magic and ultrasonic bat frequencies to torture the children. She was the one who attacked Diana and trapped the children's spirits. After killing her husband, Nancy attempts to finish off Diana. She uses a specialized hearing aid to protect herself from the lethal ultrasonic frequencies she employs through her magic. While Rooban plays the piano to stabilize the energy, Diana's spirit successfully returns to her body. The spirits of the children manage to remove Nancy's protective hearing aid, causing her to succumb to the same ultrasonic fate as her previous victims.

The film concludes with Rooban and Avantika visiting a children's home, where a recovered Diana is seen using her musical talents to provide genuine care and treatment to the children.

== Cast ==
- Aadhi Pinisetty as Ruben Vaidyalingam
- Lakshmi Menon as Dr. Avantika
- Simran as Dr. Diana, Daniel's First Wife
- Laila as Dr. Nancy Daniel, Daniel's Second Wife
- Arthi Ashwin as Swetha
- Redin Kingsley as Arogiyam
- M. S. Bhaskar as casket maker
- Rajiv Menon as Dr. Daniel Pinto
- Vivek Prasanna as Deepak
- TSR Srinivasan as library security guard
- Abhinaya as Ruben's Mother (Cameo appearance)
- P. L. Thenappan as Ruben's Father (Cameo appearance)
- Jana Nathan as Mukesh

== Production ==
=== Development ===
On 14 December 2022, Arivazhagan announced that he was collaborating with Aadhi Pinisetty after Eeram (2009) for his next directional. Touted to be in the horror genre, Arivazhagan stated "After Eeram, I've done films mainly in the thriller and action genres, and now, with this film, I'm returning to horror." He described that "adventure horror" is more suitable for the film than "comedy horror", "thriller horror" and "romantic horror". Siva of 7G Films and S. Banupriya Siva of AAlpha Frames jointly funded the film. Arivazhagan and Pinisetty would be reuniting with Thaman S, as he also was part of Eeram. Arun Bathmanaban of Magamuni (2019) fame was roped in to handle the cinematography, while National Film Awards winner V. J. Sabu Joseph was crewed to edit the film. Arivazhagan further stated "We will be shooting it in Tamil, but will simultaneously be releasing a dubbed version in Telugu", which was also followed for Eeram.

=== Casting ===
On 27 February 2023, it was announced that Lakshmi Menon was cast to play the lead actress role in the film, pairing opposite Aadhi for the first time. Arivazhagan stated "All I can reveal is that it [her role] will be a performance-orientated role, something we haven't witnessed before." On 4 March, Redin Kingsley was announced to have been cast as a comedian in the film. Five days later, Laila was announced to be part of the cast, while Simran was also announced as other important character as Laila, seven days later. Arivazhagan described them both as "Very professionals and co-operative." And stated "As performers, they are single-take artistes, who absorb the character's requirements before we shoot and are fully focused during their shots."

=== Filming ===
Principal photography commenced on 14 December 2022, with the first schedule in Munnar. A college set was erected in the schedule, spending around ₹1 crore for it. The schedule concluded by 14 February 2023. The second schedule in Chennai began in late-February, with Lakshmi Menon joining the sets by 24 February 2023. Simran and Laila began filming their respective sequences by 18 March 2023. The third schedule, which was filmed in Mumbai, concluded by 16 May 2023. On 27 September 2023, principal photography for the film was wrapped.

== Music ==
Sabdham

Soundtrack album by Thaman S
- Genre: Feature film soundtrack
- Language: Tamil / Telugu
- Label: Think Music
- Producer: Thaman S

Thaman S chronology
Daaku Maharaaj (2025)	Sabdham (2025)	They Call Him OG (2025)

Singles from Sabdham
- 1. "Maaya Maaya" Released: 13 February 2025; 2. "Grandma Song" Released: 23 February 2025

The songs and background score are composed Thaman S, in his fourth collaboration with Arivazhagan after Eeram (2009), Vallinam (2014) and Aarathu Sinam (2016); third with Aadhi in a lead role after Eeram and Ayyanar (2010). The first single "Maaya Maaya" released on 13 February 2025. The second single "Grandma Song" released on 23 February 2025.

Tamil
No.	Title	Lyrics	Singer(s)	Length
1.	"Maaya Maaya"	Viveka	Vijay Yesudas
2.	"Grandma Song"	Viveka	Vaikom Vijayalakshmi

Telugu
No.	Title	Lyrics	Singer(s)	Length
1.	"Maaya Maaya"	Ramajogayya Sastry	Saketh Kommajosyula, Sruthi Ranjani
2.	"Grandma Song"	Ramajogayya Sastry	Sahithi Chaganti

== Release ==
=== Theatrical ===
Sabdham released in theatres on 28 February 2025 in its original Tamil language, and in Telugu. The film was certified U/A 13+ by the Central Board of Film Certification.

Home Media

The Post- Theatrical rights were bagged ZEE5 And Amazon Prime Video. It began streaming simultaneously on both from 24 March 2026, an year later.

== Reception ==
A critic of Dinamalar rated the film 2.75/5 stars and wrote, " Despite having a innovative idea, the film lacks the emotional connection. However praised the cinematography, music and background score. M Suganth of The Times of India gave 2.5/5 stars and wrote "Sabdham remains intriguing until the first half when along with its protagonist, we, too, remain puzzled about what's happening.[...] the post-interval portions soon devolve into something that's fairly generic. The writing doesn't build up on the mysteries and turns very convenient and routine" Anusha Sundar of OTTPlay gave 2.5/5 stars and wrote "Sabdham is a technically strong film which sets a great premise for a horror film. If you go past some cliches, you begin to feel the film is getting somewhere. But falls into the pit of stereotypes with no extraordinary choices, and becomes a regular template-adhering story."

Gopinath Rajendran of The Hindu wrote "In an attempt to be safe and sound with its concept, Sabdham misses the high notes it requires to work, making us a mute spectator of director Arivazhagan’s most underwhelming feature film outing yet." Prashanth Vallavan of The New Indian Express rated 2/5 and wrote, "Even though the film has a number of interesting ideas, they do not rise up in coherence to create a pleasing symphony. Instead, all we get is a discordant cacophony of several story elements forcefully made to fit together." Kirubhakar Purushothaman of News 18 rated 2.5/5 and wrote, "The technical brilliance of Sabdham is resounding. The sound design of the horror sequence reveals immense dedication. The interval sequence is perhaps the boldest and most experimental attempt in Tamil horror and that alone warrants a watch."
