= O Premave =

O Premave may refer to:

- O Premave (1999 film), an Indian Kannada-language romance drama film
- O Premave (2018 film), an Indian Kannada-language romantic drama film
