= Pakka (film) =

- Film poster
- Directed by: S. S. Surya
- Produced by: T.Sivakumar
- Starring: Vikram Prabhu; Nikki Galrani; Bindhu Madhavi
- Cinematography: S. Saravanan
- Edited by: G. Sasikumar
- Music by: C. Sathya
- Production company: Benn Consortium Studios (P) Ltd
- Release date: April 27, 2018
- Country: India
- Language: Tamil

Pakka (transl. Awesome) is a 2018 Tamil language romantic comedy film directed by debutant S. S. Surya. Produced by Benn Consortium Studios (P) Ltd, starring Vikram Prabhu in dual role alongside Nikki Galrani and Bindu Madhavi. Production for the film began in February 2017. The movie was released on April 27, 2018. It received mixed reviews from both critics and audience and was considered as a "Disaster" at the box office.

== Plot ==
Nadhiya who is trying to kill herself on a railway track, but our hero Dhoni Kumar rescues her. Nadhiya mistakes Kumar for Pandi a toy-seller from the village. In a flashback it is revealed that Nadhiya, the village chief's daughter, had fallen for Pandi seeing his inherent goodness but due to parental opposition, the lovers get separated. Nadhiya runs away from her house in search of Pandi and meets up with Dhoni Kumar, who is a spitting image of Pandi. Dhoni Kumar is a carefree man who is a fan of Mahendra Singh Dhoni and he is in love with Rajini Radha, the president of a Superstar Rajinikanth fan club. Hearing the sad story of Nadhiya, Dhoni Kumar promises that he will find her lover Pandi. Dhoni also revealed that he fell love with Radha but she dies due to a firecracker blast but before she dies, he accepted her love. After hearing his story, they managed to find Pandi. It is revealed that Pandi was attacked and kidnapped. In the end, they live happily together.

== Cast ==
- Vikram Prabhu as 'Dhoni' Kumar and Pandi (Dual Role)
- Nikki Galrani as 'Rajini' Radha
- Bindu Madhavi as Nadhiya
- Soori as Murugan
- Sathish as Kumar's friend
- Nizhalgal Ravi as Nadhiya's father
- Anandaraj as Nattamai
- Bharathi Kannan as Priest
- Singamuthu as Priest
- Ravi Mariya as Magizhchi Minor
- Imman Annachi as Ferris Wheel Operator
- Rani as Nattamai's wife
- Singampuli
- Vaiyapuri
- Ambani Shankar
- T. Sivakumar as Police Officer
- Subhashini as Radha's friend
- Shanthini Theva as Radha's friend
- Scissor Manohar as Deaf Man
- Muthukaalai as Drunkard
- Benjamin as Drunkard
- Sai Dheena as Singapore Groom
- Jayamani
- J. S. Hariharan

== Soundtrack ==
Pakka

Soundtrack album by C. Sathya
- Released: Jan 22, 2018
- Recorded: 2018
- Genre: Soundtrack
- Length: 18:31
- Label: Lahari Music
- Producer: C. Sathya

C. Sathya chronology
Bayama Irukku (2017)	Pakka (2018)	Aghavan (2019)

The Soundtrack was composed by C. Sathya and Released by Lahari Music.

Track-List
No.	Title	Lyrics	Singer(s)	Length
1.	"Ola Veedu Nallaala"	Yugabharathi	Mathichiyam Bala, Palaniammal	4:58
2.	"Enga Pona"	Yugabharathi	Reema	2:36
3.	"Izhutha Izhupukku"	Kabilan	Shivai Vyas, Priya Himesh	3:33
4.	"Kannukulla"	Yugabharathi	Mahalingam	3:10
5.	"Dopu Singari"	Yugabharathi	Mahalingam, Lakshmi	4:14
Total length:				18:31

== Production ==
In November 2016, it was reported that Vikram Prabhu had agreed terms to work on a film titled Pakka directed by newcomer Surya. Nikki Galrani signed on to play the leading female role in January 2017, and worked on the film alongside her commitments in Neruppu Da (2017), which also featured her alongside Vikram Prabhu. The project became Nikki Galrani's 25th film, and the director revealed that she would portray a Rajinikanth fan. Director Surya revealed Pakka would be a "complete commercial entertainer which is set against a rural backdrop", and also confirmed that the team had signed on actors Soori, Sathish and Anandaraj for supporting roles.

The team began the shoot on 1 February 2017 in Courtallam, undertaking a schedule for twenty days. Other than this film is produced by T. Sivakumar and Coproduced by P.B.Saravanan
