= TamilRockers =

BitTorrent website

- Website type: Torrent index, magnet links provider, Peer-to-peer
- Available in: English
- Headquarters: India
- Area served: Worldwide
- Revenue: Advertisements
- Registration: Optional, free
- Launched: 2011; 15 years ago
- Current status: Permanently closed

TamilRockers is a torrent website based in India which facilitates unauthorized distribution of copyrighted material, including television shows, movies, music and videos. The site allows visitors to search for and download copyrighted material with the help of magnet links and torrent files, which facilitate peer-to-peer file sharing. It also operates multiple Telegram channels and groups with thousands of subscribers. TamilRockers is the tenth most popular torrent site in TorrentFreak's Top 10 Most Popular Torrent Sites of 2020 list.

In India, ISPs have been ordered to block access to the website. The website continues operation by switching to a series of new web addresses. Aside from its traditional list of pirate sites, apps, and hosting providers, the movie industry group Motion Picture Association (MPA) lists TamilRockers as one of the notorious markets.

== History ==
TamilRockers was a [bootleg recording] network which was founded in 2011 and later became a public torrent website that links to pirated copies of [Cinema of India|Indian films], particularly [Tamil cinema|Tamil], in addition to Hollywood films dubbed into Indian languages along with the original English audio.

On 14 March 2018, three men said to be behind the site were arrested. One of the men was believed to be the site administrator. On 23 May 2019, more members of TamilRockers were arrested in Coimbatore.

On 19 October 2020, the site went offline and came back online after a while but later went completely offline ceasing operations permanently; it was speculated that Amazon intervened by issuing several DMCA takedown notices.

On 28 July 2024 another person who was reported to be an admin of the site was arrested by Thiruvananthapuram police while recording a movie in the theatre for pirating.

== Legacy ==
=== Unofficial clones ===
Since the official TamilRockers went offline, there has been two prominent clone websites called TamilMV and Tamil Blasters, which are also been targeted by ISPs to block them. In May, 2022, Disney Star, a subsidiary of The Walt Disney Company, filed complaint with police in India, targeting Tamil Rockers, TamilMV, and Tamil Blasters.

== In popular culture ==
The TamilRockers name has made cameo in many Tamil movies, including a Tamil movie Tamil Rockers starring Premgi Amaren released on 31 December 2021.

On 2 July 2022, SonyLIV released a series named Tamil Rockerz, which is about online piracy and cybercrime, it stars Arun Vijay and Vani Bhojan, directed by Arivazhagan.
