= Vikram Prabhu =

Indian film actor

Kalaimamani Vikram Prabhu
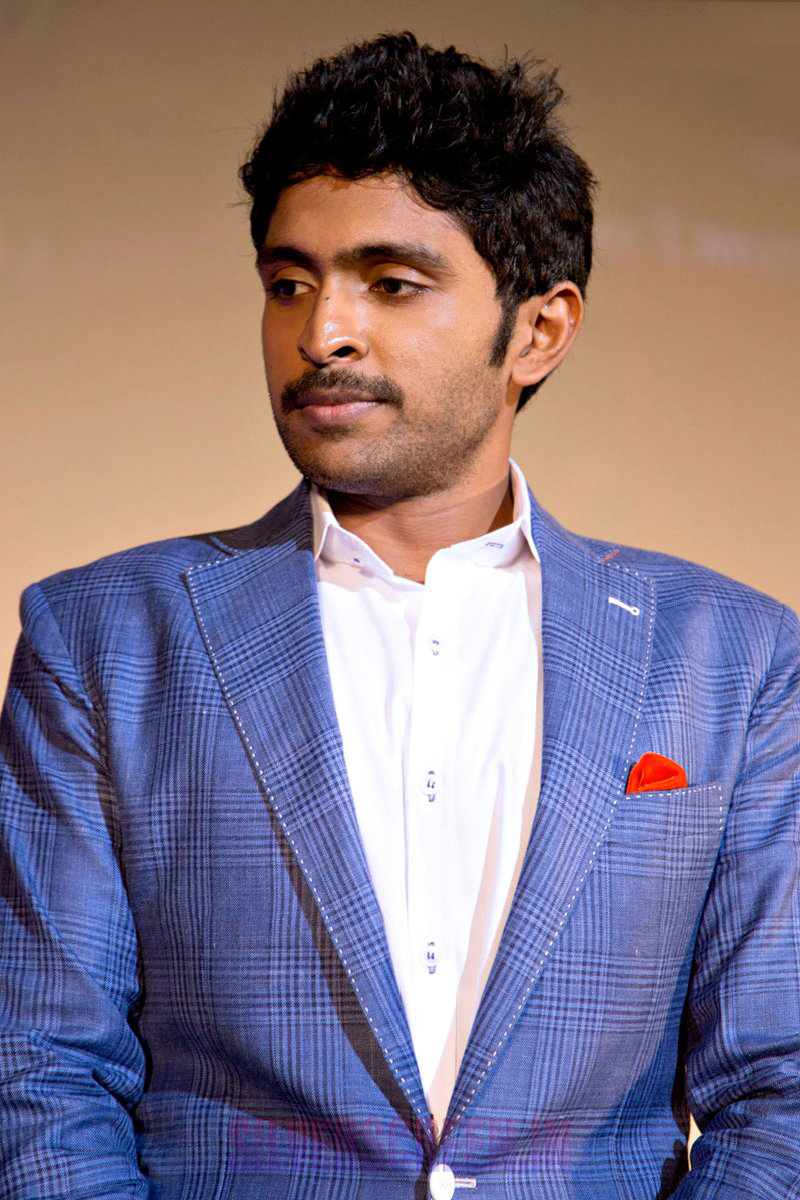
- Vikram Prabhu in 2014
- Born: 15 January 1986 (age 40); Chennai, Tamil Nadu, India
- Occupation: Actor
- Years active: 2012–present
- Spouse: Lakshmi Ujjaini (m. 2007)
- Children: 1
- Father: Prabhu
- Relatives: Sivaji Ganesan (grandfather); Ramkumar Ganesan (uncle)
- Awards: Kalaimamani Award (2022)

Vikram Prabhu is an Indian actor working in Tamil language films who made his debut in Prabhu Solomon's Kumki (2012). He also played the protagonist in Ivan Veramathiri (2013) and Vellaikaara Durai (2014). He is the son of actor Prabhu and grandson of the veteran actor Sivaji Ganesan.

== Career ==
=== 2012–2015: Early career and recognition ===
Vikram signed on for a venture under the direction of Prabhu Solomon to be produced by N. Linguswamy. Titled Kumki, the film was based on elephants and the director thus sent Vikram to an elephant training camp in Ottapalam in Kerala to get himself accustomed to the animals. The film released in December 2012 to critical acclaim and commercial success, emerging as one of the biggest hits of the year. A critic stated that Prabhu excels in the "intensely emotional scenes in the climax", while that "he is also at ease portraying angst, gratitude and rage". Furthermore, the critic wrote that "his physique is a major plus", giving the verdict that he "is expected to carry on the Ganesan family lineage" in films.

During the making of Kumki, Vikram Prabhu began work in Sattam Oru Iruttarai, a remake of the 1981 film of the same name, produced by Vijay. He began filming and played the role of an angry young man who feels that the legal system is flawed. The film, which began production in May 2012 was directed by Sneha. However the insistence of Prabhu Solomon to reshoot the climax of Kumki, led to the actor leaving Sattam Oru Iruttarai during production and after a period of delay he was replaced by newcomer Thaman Kumar. Subsequently, he signed on to appear in M. Saravanan's action thriller film Ivan Veramathiri and portrayed the role of a student amongst an ensemble cast also featuring Vamsi Krishna and Ganesh Venkatraman. The film opened in December 2013 to positive reviews, with a critic noting that Vikram Prabhu "is convincing as an action hero, especially in the raw and realistic climax fight scene, but has to work on his dance a bit more."

His first 2014 release was the action thriller Arima Nambi, which was directed by Anand Shankar, an assistant director to A. R. Murugadoss. Later that year, he was seen in Gaurav's Sigaram Thodu, a family action entertainer, which featured the actor in two distinct looks and alongside Sathyaraj and Monal Gajjar. He had a third release in 2014, Vellaikaara Durai, directed by Ezhil, that has Sridivya in the cast. This released on Christmas 2014, which was a rom-com and was considered a hit. In 2015, his next movie was Idhu Enna Maayam, a romantic comedy directed by A. L. Vijay. "Despite his good performance, actor Vikram Prabhu looks extremely awkward and out of place as a college student; said Rediff.com's review.

=== 2016–2018: Setback ===
In July 2016, Vikram Prabhu launched a production house named "First Artist", under which he would produce future films.

His next venture was an action film, Wagah (2016). Sify described; "Vikram Prabhu is earnest in the film and tries hard to rise above a muddled script and poorly written dialogues". His next film was Veera Sivaji (2016). Once again Vikram Prabhu is earnest with his performance but fail to rise above the severely flawed script. In 2017, the gangster thriller Sathriyan was released. Performance wise, Vikram Prabhu is perfect as the angry young man. His body language and dialogue deliver aptly suit his characterization, easily Sathriyan is his comeback film as an actor. Vikram Prabhu has ventured into production through Neruppu Da (2017), and their promotions promised to talk about the hardships and lifestyle of the firemen. After acting in action and serious subjects, Vikram Prabhu appears in a comedy role in his movie Pakka (2018). Vikram Prabhu has played a dual role. The movie has Nikki Galrani in the female lead with Bindu Madhavi' s Tamil fame enacting an important character. Then he appeared in Radha Mohan' s, 60 Vayadu Maaniram (2018) and action thriller Thuppakki Munai (2018).

=== 2020–present ===
The next was a family ensemble cast led by veterans R. Sarathkumar and Radhika, in Dhana Sekaran's Vaanam Kottatum (2020). Mani Ratnam producing and also co-writing. Vikram Prabhu's mature and believable performance is complemented by Aishwarya Rajesh. Then, Asuraguru (2020) is a below average heist thriller. After, he starred in Pulikkuthi Pandi (2021) and Taanakkaran (2022). The 2 films were released in OTT and received positive reviews. Following this, he was cast in the 2 part multi-starter Ponniyin Selvan: I (2022) and Ponniyin Selvan: II (2023). Both were directed by Mani Ratnam and based on Kalki's eponymous novel. They ended up with positive reviews and commercial success. His next movie was Paayum Oli Nee Yenakku (2023), Irugapatru (2023) and Raid (2023). Vikram Prabhu made his Telugu cinema debut with Ghaati (2025), co-starring with Anushka Shetty and directed by Krish Jagarlamudi.

== Personal life ==
Vikram studied Bachelors in Theatre Arts from San Diego State University in 2006-07 and briefly returned to Chennai to help out in the production activities of his family's Sivaji Productions venture, Chandramukhi (2005).

On 26 February 2007, Vikram married Lakshmi Ujjaini, the daughter of Industrialist 'Cavalier' Dr. M.S. Mathivanan.

== Filmography ==
- All films are in Tamil, unless otherwise noted.

List of Vikram Prabhu film credits
Year	Title	Role(s)	Notes
2012	Kumki	Bomman	
2013	Ivan Veramathiri	Gunasekhar	
2014	Arima Nambi	Arjun Krishna	
2014	Sigaram Thodu	Muralipandiyan	
2014	Vellaikaara Durai	Murugan	
2015	Idhu Enna Maayam	Arun	
2016	Wagah	Vasu	
2016	Veera Sivaji	Sivaji	
2017	Sathriyan	Guna	
2017	Neruppu Da	Guru	Also producer
2018	Pakka	Dhoni Kumar, Pandi	
2018	60 Vayadu Maaniram	Shiva	
2018	Thuppakki Munai	Birla Bose	
2020	Vaanam Kottattum	Selva	
2020	Asuraguru	Shakthi	
2021	Pulikkuthi Pandi	Pulikkuthi Pandi	TV film
2022	Taanakkaran	Arivu (a) Arivazhagan	
2022	Ponniyin Selvan: I	Parthibendra Pallava	
2023	Ponniyin Selvan: II	Parthibendra Pallava	
2023	Paayum Oli Nee Yenakku	Aravind	
2023	Irugapatru	Manohar	
2023	Raid	Prabhakaran	
2025	Love Marriage	Ramachandran "Ram"	
2025	Ghaati	Desi Raju	Telugu film
2025	Sirai	Constable V. Kathiravan	25th Film
TBA	City of Gold		

Key
†	Denotes films that have not yet been released

== Awards ==
- 2022: Received title of Kalaimamani Award by the Government of Tamil Nadu, which is the highest state honour in the field of Arts
- Vijay Award for Best Debut Actor – Kumki (2012)
- Tamil Nadu State Film Award Special Prize – Best Actor – Kumki (2012)
- SIIMA Award for Best Debut Actor – Kumki (2012)
- Audi Ritz Icon Awards (2014)
- Tamil Nadu State Film Award for Best Actor - Taanakkaran (2022)
