= Kishore Te =

Indian film editor (1978–2015)

- Born: 24 March 1978; Valavanur, South Arcot District (now Villupuram district), Tamil Nadu, India
- Died: 6 March 2015 (aged 36); Chennai, Tamil Nadu, India
- Occupation: Editor
- Years active: 2000-2015

Kishore Te (24 March 1978 – 6 March 2015) was an Indian film editor who worked in Tamil, Kannada and Telugu films. For his work in Aadukalam (2011) and Visaranai (2015), he won the National Film Award for Best Editing.

== Career ==
At age 21, Kishore joined film editors B. Lenin and V. T. Vijayan as an assistant. He worked on more than 70 Tamil, Telugu, and Hindi films as an assistant editor. His first independent film as an editor was the Tamil film Eeram (2009) produced by Shankar and directed by Arivazhagan.

== Death ==
Kishore suddenly swooned while editing a film and upon being rushed to the hospital, he was diagnosed with a brain clot. Despite a surgery, he never regained consciousness. He died on 6 March 2015, barely three weeks before his 37th birthday.

== Filmography ==
| Year | Film | Language | Notes |
|---|---|---|---|
| 2000 | Pandavas: The Five Warriors | English | Negative cutter |
| 2009 | Eeram | Tamil | Nominated - Vijay Award for Best Editor Winner- Vikatan Award for Best Editing |
| 2010 | Prithvi | Kannada | |
| 2010 | Anandhapurathu Veedu | Tamil | |
| 2011 | Aadukalam | Tamil | National Film Award for Best Editing Winner- Vikatan Award for Best Editing |
| 2011 | Payanam | Tamil | |
| 2011 | Aadu Puli | Tamil | |
| 2011 | Mappillai | Tamil | |
| 2011 | Udhayan | Tamil | |
| 2011 | 180 | Telugu | |
| 2011 | Nootrenbadhu | Tamil | |
| 2011 | Engeyum Eppodhum | Tamil | Vijay Award for Best Editor |
| 2011 | Kanchana | Tamil | |
| 2012 | Dhoni | Tamil | |
| 2012 | Dhoni | Telugu | |
| 2012 | Aarohanam | Tamil | |
| 2012 | Ammavin Kaipesi | Tamil | |
| 2013 | Paradesi | Tamil | |
| 2013 | Ethir Neechal | Tamil | |
| 2013 | Udhayam NH4 | Tamil | |
| 2013 | Madha Yaanai Koottam | Tamil | |
| 2014 | Vetri Selvan | Tamil | |
| 2014 | Nedunchaalai | Tamil | |
| 2014 | Kamasutra 3D | English | |
| 2014 | Pulivaal | Tamil | |
| 2014 | Vanavarayan Vallavarayan | Tamil | |
| 2014 | Un Samayal Arayil | Tamil | |
| 2014 | Ulavacharu Biryani | Telugu | |
| 2014 | Oggarane | Kannada | |
| 2015 | Kanchana 2 | Tamil | |
| 2015 | Kaaka Muttai | Tamil | Vikatan Award For Best Editing (Posthumous) |
| 2016 | Visaranai | Tamil | after death this film was completed by his assistant G. B. Venkatesh National Film Award for Best Editing Vikatan Awards for Best Editing (Posthumous) |
| 2016 | Sawaari | Tamil | |
