= K. M. Bhaskaran =

Indian cinematographer

K.M.Bhaskaran
- Born: April 14
- Education: D.F.Tech
- Alma mater: M.G.R. Government Film and Television Training Institute
- Occupation: Cinematographer
- Years active: 2014 - present

K.M.Bhaskaran is an Indian cinematographer who predominantly works in Tamil cinema. His career as cinematographer started in the movie Vallinam (2014).

== Early life ==
K.M.Bhaskaran was a cinematography student from M.G.R. Government Film and Television Training Institute.

== Career ==
K.M.Bhaskaran started his career as a cinematographer in Arivazhagan Venkatachalam's directorial Vallinam starring Nakul. His next association with his mentor Vijay Milton for the Vikram and Samantha Ruth Prabhu starrer 10 Endrathukulla which was produced by AR Murugadoss under Fox Star Studios. His previous project was again with director Arivazhagan Venkatachalam for the movie Kuttram 23 starring Arun Vijay, after their first successful outing.

== Filmography ==
Year	Movie	Language	Notes
2014	Vallinam	Tamil	
2015	10 Endrathukulla	Tamil	
2015	99	Tamil	BehindWoods Gold medal for Best Short Film 2015
2017	Kuttram 23	Tamil	
2020	Kannum Kannum Kollaiyadithaal	Tamil	Best Director of Photography award from OSAKA japan
2022	Don	Tamil	
2026	Gatta Kusthi 2	Tamil	
TBA	Rainbow	Telugu	Filming
