= 10 Endrathukulla =

2015 Indian film by Vijay Milton

- Theatrical release poster
- Directed by: Vijay Milton
- Written by: Vijay Milton
- Produced by: AR Murugadoss
- Starring: Vikram; Samantha Ruth Prabhu
- Cinematography: Bhaskaran K.M
- Edited by: A. Sreekar Prasad
- Music by: Songs: D. Imman; Background score: Anoop Seelin
- Production company: AR Murugadoss Productions
- Distributed by: Fox Star Studios
- Release date: 21 October 2015
- Running time: 144 minutes
- Country: India
- Language: Tamil
- Budget: ₹40 crore
- Box office: est. ₹28 crore

10 Endrathukulla (transl. Before counting to 10) is a 2015 Indian Tamil-language road action film written and directed by Vijay Milton and produced by A. R. Murugadoss under the banner A. R. Murugadoss Productions and Fox Star Studios. The film stars Vikram and Samantha Ruth Prabhu, alongside Pasupathy, Rahul Dev and Abhimanyu Singh.

Made on a budget of ₹40 crore, principal photography and filming took place in February 2014. The film was slated for a January 2015 release, but was postponed, due to the release of I (2015). 10 Endrathukulla was released on 21 October 2015, coinciding with the Dusshera festival. The film received mixed reviews. This film was a box office bomb.

== Plot ==
A getaway driver who refers to himself by various names (such as "James Bond," "Mani Ratnam," "Sunil Gavaskar," and "Sachin Tendulkar) but never reveals his actual name is assigned by a local criminal named Das to deliver a woman named Shakeela to Pooran Singh in Mussoorie. Shakeela is an orphan who has failed her driving test 14 times. The driver is constantly irritated by Shakeela's antics during the journey to Mussoorie but soon falls in love with her. At Mussoorie, he kills Pooran and learns that Shakeela will be delivered to Daksha Bhai, an upper-caste landlord from an Uttarakhand village.

The driver delivers Shakeela to Daksha and is invited to stay at his ancestral mansion for a festival. During the stay, he finds out why Shakeela has been delivered to Daksha: Shakeela is the doppelgänger of Daksha Bhai's sister Gadgi Moi, a cruel, merciless upper-caste leader who has been sentenced to death for orchestrating a massacre against the lower-caste people. Daksha Bhai plans to send Shakeela to jail in place of Gadgi, who has been released on parole, to perform the last rites of her dead grandmother. The plan backfires as Shakeela escapes from the police.

In the chaos that ensues, Gadgi breaks her cover and kidnaps Shakeela, planning to kill her on a moving train, but the driver arrives to save Shakeela and defeats Gadgi. He kills Gadgi by throwing her off the train and in anger Daksha kills Shakeela. Later, Daksha realizes that he had killed Gadgi and the driver had thrown Shakeela into his car. Distraught at Gadgi's death, Daksha commits suicide by jumping off the train with her corpse. Ultimately, the driver and Shakeela, who are now in a relationship, happily drive back to Chennai. During the journey, the driver whispers his real name in Shakeela's ear, to which she acts repulsed

== Cast ==
- Vikram as James Bond
- Samantha Ruth Prabhu in dual role as Shakeela and Gadgi Moi
- Pasupathy as Das
- Rahul Dev as Daksha Bhai
- Abhimanyu Singh as Pooran Singh
- Sanjay Kapoor as Krish Mehta
- Sunil Thapa as Lawyer
- Ramdoss as Driving Instructor's boss
- Sam Anderson as Das's henchman
- Saravana Subbiah as Police Officer
- Ajay as a gang leader in Telangana
- Ganja Karuppu as Ezhil
- Manobala as Manikandan
- Imman Annachi as Annachi
- Sangili Murugan as Rajalingam
- T. M. Karthik as Doctor
- Sreethu Krishnan as the driver's sister
- Billy as Billy
- Seetha as ATM
- Pandi as ATM's boyfriend
- Shanthi Mani
- Jay Andhana as a doctor
- Charmy Kaur in a special appearance in the song "Gaana Gaana"
- Sridhar in a special appearance in the song "Vroom Vroom"

== Production ==
=== Development ===
Vijay Milton collaborated with Vikram for his next film. Director AR Murugadoss was confirmed to be bankrolling the film along with Fox Star Studios. Initially titled Idam Maari Irangiyavan, the film was later renamed as 10 Endrathukulla. D. Imman was signed on as composer for this film, which the composer confirmed through his official Twitter handle. The film is supposed to be a road movie, which Behindwoods states was a relatively fresh genre for the Tamil audience.

=== Casting ===
Samantha was selected to play a lead role, marking her first collaboration with Vikram. Pasupathy has been roped in to play an important role in the film. In August 2014, Ramdoss of Mundasupatti (2014) fame was added to the cast.

=== Filming ===
Scenes involving Vikram and Samantha were shot in Chennai for a week's time, and the team was spotted filming in the MRC Nagar area of Chennai. The film began its first schedule on 26 May 2014. The film's first schedule ran for 7 days covering Hyderabad, Ladakh, Sikkim and many major North Indian cities. A major portion of filming is also done in Nepal, whose location are mainly Bhaktapur. The crew reported that they would shoot in many exotic locations across the globe, but also strictly adhere to a 6 months time frame, when the project will be completed. Furthermore, the team also promised a surprise Hollywood crew in the movie. The second schedule began on 23 June 2014. On 23 July 2014, the second schedule was completed, and the next schedule began subsequently. A song sequence featuring the lead pair was shot in a set erected near DMI College of Engineering near Sriperumbudur in August 2014. In late August 2014, about 3 schedules in were completed in Chennai, In One of the 3 schedules, a scene featuring the lead actress Samantha, actor Vikram in a duck farm near Madha Engg. College was shot, and the fourth schedule was planned to be shot in Pune for close to 20 days, with the schedule including a song sequence as well. The climax of the film was shot in Nepal and the train sequence Cappadocia, Turkey.

In October, Charmme Kaur shot for a nine-minute-long song, which was said to have been designed like a play, with Charmme appearing as a character throughout the song. A set for about two-and-a-half crore rupees had been erected in Pune for the shoot. In September, 80% of the film was complete. One song scene was shot in Sikkim mountains on 29 October 2014. The shoot was done in Sikkim, Bagdogra, Jaipur and Delhi. The film team roped Racer Narain Karthikeyan for the action sequences with the racing car. Samantha said that the film was the toughest character she has played so far, she had also been trained to smoke as part of a scene. On 8 April 2015, the filming part ended at Nepal and post production started. Lee Whittaker was the action director in the film.

== Soundtrack ==
"10 Endrathukulla is a commercially packed script. It's Vijay Milton's second movie, after this year's super hit Goli Soda, and has an interesting line. Since it's a road movie, it gives me an opportunity to explore racy music"

— Music composer D. Imman about working for 10 Endrathukulla

D. Imman composed the soundtrack, while Anoop Seelin has composed the background score for the film. On an interview with Behindwoods, about working for 10 Endrathukulla, which is a high-octane racy thriller film, Imman said that it gave the opportunity for him to explore racy music since the film was a road thriller.

The soundtrack album features 8 songs composed by D. Imman, featuring a piece of theme music, male and female version of the title track and two karaoke versions of the songs. While all the song lyrics were written by Madhan Karky, Mani Amudhavan penned both the male and female versions of the title track "10 Endrathukulla". Sony Music acquired the audio rights of the film and subsequently for legal purchase as a soundtrack on digital music platform, iTunes.

The first track, "Vroom Vroom," is penned by Madhan Karky, and rendered by Santhosh Hariharan, with backing vocals by D. Imman. The song is termed as a racy bike ride, supported well by a thumping rhythm and bass guitar. Indian musical instruments like Sitar and Mrudangam feature throughout the track.

10 Endrathukulla has a sound that belongs to a style. This special sound comes from Vishal Dadlani singing and Emcee Jesz’s rap parts. 10 Endrathukulla makes you feel like you are speeding down a road, on a motorcycle. The drums and electric guitar give a hint of old‑school rock and the hip‑hop chorus adds another layer. One of the parts of 10 Endrathukulla is the electric guitar solo that appears in the interlude and that solo gives the track a distinct identity.

The song "10 Endrathukulla" performed by Vaikom Vijayalakshmi takes a look, at the track. Of the classic rock feel of the original it uses hip-hop beats, trance music and house style sounds. This new style makes the song feel different and brings something to the album.

10 Enradhukulla

Soundtrack album by D. Imman
- Released: 17 September 2015
- Recorded: 2014–2015
- Genre: Feature film soundtrack
- Length: 36:52
- Language: Tamil
- Label: Sony Music
- Producer: D. Imman

D. Imman chronology
Paayum Puli (2015)	10 Enradhukulla (2015)	Queen (2018)

Singles from 10 Endrathukulla
- 1. "Vroom Vroom" Released: 28 August 2015

The song "Vroom Vroom" was released as a single on 28 August 2015. The tracklist of the film was unveiled on 15 September 2015, through the official Twitter handle of Sony Music South and the entire album was released on 17 September 2015, at the Suryan FM Radio Station, Chennai. The makers also made to launch the jukebox in all streaming platforms on the same day.

Track listing
No.	Title	Lyrics	Singer(s)	Length
1.	"Vroom Vroom"	Madhan Karky	Santosh Hariharan, D. Imman	4:41
2.	"Aanalum Indha Mayakkam"	Madhan Karky	Sathya Prakash, Vandhana Srinivasan ( Female Backing Vocal)	5:00
3.	"Pathu Endrathukulla" (Female Version)	Mani Amudhavan	Vaikom Vijayalakshmi	3:30
4.	"Gaana Gaana"	Madhan Karky	Shreya Ghoshal, Anand Aravindakshan	6:22
5.	"Pathu Endrathukulla" (Male Version)	Mani Amudhavan	Vishal Dadlani, Emcee Jesz	4:11
6.	"Mysterious Travel" (Theme)		D. Imman	3:29
7.	"Aanalum Indha Mayakkam" (Karaoke Version)			4:59
8.	"Vroom Vroom" (Karaoke Version)			4:42
Total length:				36:52

== Release ==
The film was initially expected to be released by January 2015, but citing the release of the Vikram's other film I, 10 Enradhukulla's release was pushed to April, which further moved to 21 October 2015, to coincide with the Dusshera festival.

=== Critical reception ===
Anupama Subramaniam of Deccan Chronicle gave 2/5 stars and wrote "10 Endrathukulla is a good pathology of current Tamil cinema: you have the decision makers of the filming world deciding that it is best to forego artistic ingenuity in favour of safe and predictable entertainment." M. Suganth of The Times of India gave 2/5 stars and wrote "The film lacks the liveliness of a masala entertainer."

S. Saraswathi of Rediff gave 2/5 stars and wrote, "10 Endrathukulla is a tedious road film marred by overzealous performances, ordinary music, tacky CGI and poor execution." Latha Srinivasan of DNA gave 2/5 stars and wrote "It's high time Vikram really rethinks his script choices. This movie is strictly for Vikram fans."

Baradwaj Rangan of The Hindu wrote "With 10 Enradhukulla, Milton has made exactly the kind of movie for which Goli Soda appeared an antidote. The writing is shockingly scattershot, right from the scene that's supposed to set up the story." Sify wrote "10 Enradhukulla is an average film which can be watched once for the chase scenes and performance of Vikram."

=== Box office ===
10 Endrathukulla was reported to have collected ₹6.5 crore in India on its first day and almost ₹5 crore in South India alone.
