= Don (2022 film) =

2022 film directed by Cibi Chakaravarthi

- Theatrical release poster
- Directed by: Cibi Chakaravarthi
- Written by: Cibi Chakaravarthi
- Produced by: Allirajah Subaskaran; Sivakarthikeyan
- Starring: Sivakarthikeyan; Priyanka Mohan; S. J. Suryah; P. Samuthirakani; Soori
- Cinematography: K. M. Bhaskaran
- Edited by: Nagooran Ramachandran
- Music by: Anirudh Ravichander
- Production companies: Lyca Productions; Sivakarthikeyan Productions
- Distributed by: PVR Pictures; Red Giant Movies
- Release date: 13 May 2022
- Running time: 163 minutes
- Country: India
- Language: Tamil
- Box office: ₹110 crore

Don is a 2022 Indian Tamil-language coming-of-age comedy drama film written and directed by Cibi Chakaravarthi in his directorial debut. Produced by Lyca Productions and Sivakarthikeyan Productions, it stars Sivakarthikeyan in the main lead role alongside S. J. Suryah, P. Samuthirakani, Priyanka Mohan, and Soori. The film revolves around a reluctant engineering student repeatedly clashing with his college's discipline mentor, while still trying to discover his passion in life and prove his eligibility to his father.

The film was officially announced in 2021 with production taking place between February–December 2021. It was shot extensively across Tamil Nadu including Coimbatore, Chennai, Pollachi and Udumalaipettai, while a song was filmed in Agra. The film features music composed by Anirudh Ravichander, with cinematography and editing by K. M. Bhaskaran and Nagooran Ramachandran respectively.

Don was released in theatres on 13 May 2022. The film received positive reviews from critics. The film became a commercial success, grossing ₹110 crore worldwide, emerging as the sixth highest-grossing Tamil film of 2022

== Plot ==
Chakaravarthi, a famous Film Director, is desperately trying to make it to Best Engineering College in Coimbatore from Munnar. As Chakaravarthi drives, he narrates the story of his school days and his college days.

During Chakaravarthi's school days, Chakaravarthi's father, Ganesan, is very strict who cares a lot about Chakaravarthi's studies and Ganesan wants Chakaravarthi to become a civil engineer. But Chakaravarthi hates studying, he fails in examinations and he lies to his father about his examination marks. At the same time, Chakaravarthi falls in love with Angaiyarkanni. Initially, she avoids him but soon she reciprocates his love. However, they both go their separate ways after Ganesan and Angaiyarkanni's father confront Chakaravarthi's and Angaiyarkanni's relationship since Chakaravarthi claims Angaiyarkanni is just his friend to avoid his father bashing him up.

Chakaravarthi joins Best Engineering College in Coimbatore. However, the Best Engineering College's Disciplinarian Professor, Bhoominathan, whom the students fear and hate, ruins his expectations of enjoying college life. Chakaravarthi constructs a plan to send Bhoominathan away to be a visiting professor at St. Paul's University in Russia so that students can be happy. This earns Chakaravarthi nickname of "Don" of the Best Engineering College. Meanwhile, Chakaravarthi meets Angaiyarkanni again, who is also a part of Best Engineering College in Coimbatore. Angaiyarkanni's best friend Lilly, a first-year student, despite Chakaravarthi's attempts to woo Angaiyarkanni. Lilly explains to Chakaravarthi that, after the incident happened between Chakaravarthi and Angaiyarkanni in their school days, Angaiyarkanni's father stopped talking to Angaiyarkanni.

Chakaravarthi successfully patches them up after creating a short film and ends it on an emotional note with Angaiyarkanni's father and Angaiyarkanni reconciling. Angaiyarkanni is impressed and reciprocates her feelings. Amidst this, Bhoominathan unexpectedly returns from Russia after 2 months and Bhoominathan discovers that Chakaravarthi sent him Russia. In revenge, Bhoominathan's assistant photographs clicks photo of Chakaravarthi and Angaiyarkanni at the Taj Mahal. Bhoominathan uses it to complaint to Killivallavan, the Best Engineering College's Chairman. Chakaravarthi, in return, presents a photo of Bhoominathan and Swetha Miss at the Taj Mahal. It gains the wrath of Killivallavan, who is disappointed in Bhoominathan.

Meanwhile, Ganesan discovers the truth about Chakaravarthi, including his College Examination Marks. Feeling cheated and enraged, Ganesan slaps Chakaravarthi in front of everyone at the Best Engineering College. Chakaravarthi ventures into filmmaking by attending a short film competition. However, Ganesan does not allow Chakaravarthi to do filmmaking and Ganesan wants Chakaravarthi to do civil engineering. Chakaravarthi secretly films portions of the Best Engineering College with his cameraman Perusu. At the film's climax, Bhoominathan finds out about his secret filming. In a mix of guns, drama, and confusion, Bhoominathan suffers an accident that severely injures his neck, but Bhoominathan eventually survives. Killivallavan dismisses Chakaravarthi from Best Engineering College.

Ganesan discovers Chakaravarthi's secret filmmaking and he destroys his short film, resulting in an intense conflict between Ganesan and Chakaravarthi. Frustrated with Ganesan, Chakaravarthi leaves the house. Ganesan later dies due to depression. Bhoominathan gradually recovers while Chakaravarthi prepares another short film for the competition. Bhoominathan and Chakaravarthi develop a positive rapport. Bhoominathan tells Chakaravarthi that he spoke with Killivallavan. Killivallavan informs Chakaravarthi that if he clears all of his arrears, he can get his civil engineering degree, thus burying the hatchet and ending their conflict. Chakaravarthi's short film gets shortlisted to the top and becomes a successful feature film. The film, "Untold Love", is about Chakaravarthi's emotional bond with Ganesan. Chakaravarthi realises that Ganesan cared about him before he died. Later Chakaravarthi and Angaiyarkanni gets married.

In the present, Chakaravarthi is desperate to get his civil engineering degree from Bhoominathan; that is the only reason to attend college. Chakaravarthi accepts and takes his civil engineering degree from Best Engineering College. Chakravarthi then delivers an emotional speech to the students and audience. He also sees a vision of Ganesan applauding. Chakaravarthi is added to the Proud Alumni list at Best Engineering College, which was something Chakaravarthi jokingly asked Bhoominathan in his earlier college days.

== Cast ==
- Sivakarthikeyan as Chakaravarthi Ganesan, Ganesan's and Bhavani's son
- S. J. Suryah as Bhoominathan, Best Engineering College's Disciplinarian Professor, later Best Engineering College's Principal.
- Priyanka Mohan as Angaiyarkanni, Chakaravarthi's girlfriend turned wife
- P. Samuthirakani as Ganesan, Bhavani's husband, and Chakaravarthi's father
- Aadhira Pandilakshmi as Bhavani Ganesan, Ganesan's wife, and Chakaravarthi's mother
- Gajaraj as Chakaravarthi's uncle
- Soori as Perusu, Chakaravarthi's childhood friend
- Bala Saravanan as Bala, Chakaravarthi's friend
- RJ Vijay as Mani, Chakravarthi's friend
- Sivaangi Krishnakumar as Lilly, Angaiyarkanni's best friend
- Singampuli as Kandhan, a Drama Artist
- Munishkanth as Professor Azhagu
- Kaali Venkat as Professor Arivu
- Raju Jeyamohan as Raghu
- Shariq Hassan as Teja
- Swetha Venkit as Swetha Miss
- Radha Ravi as Killivallavan, Best Engineering College's Chairman
- Manobala as School Teacher and Examination Invigilator
- George Maryan as George Mathews, Best Engineering College's Principal, later replaced by Bhoominathan
- Maheshwari Chanakyan as Contest Anchor
- Kavitha Bharathy as Film Director
- Gautham Vasudev Menon as Gautham Vasudev Menon (cameo appearance)
- Cibi Chakaravarthi as Cibi Chakaravarthi (in portrait)
- Nagooran Ramachandran as Nagooran Ramachandran (in portrait)

== Production ==
=== Development ===
In August 2017, Sivakarthikeyan was reported to collaborate with his friend Vignesh Shivan, post Suriya's Thaanaa Serndha Koottam, with the film's producer K. E. Gnanavel Raja of Studio Green also obtained its rights for the forthcoming project. However, the film failed to materialise and in March 2018, and Sivakarthikeyan instead agreed to do another film for Raja, which became the M. Rajesh-directorial Mr. Local. In March 2019, Lyca Productions announced another project featuring Sivakarthikeyan and Vignesh Shivan with Anirudh Ravichander set to score music. Vignesh also finalised the script for the film in June 2019, as the project was scheduled to begin production the following month. In a turn of events, Lyca Productions backed out of producing the venture and Vignesh Shivan too prioritised to revive his shelved project Kaathuvaakula Rendu Kaadhal which began production in late-2020.

In September 2020, Sivakarthikeyan announced another new project for Lyca Productions with a debutant director hired to helm the project. The project was officially announced on 27 January 2021, which was titled as Don in Tamil and was later titled as College Don for the Telugu version and the actor himself co-produced the film under his Sivakarthikeyan Productions banner. It was directed by Cibi Chakaravarthi, an associate director of Atlee, with Anirudh Ravichander being the music composer. Sivakarthikeyan was reported to appear as a school student for few portions in the film, and also reduced weight for his role.

In an interview with Ananda Vikatan, Chakravarthi described Don as an extended version of a short film titled Bittu, starring Kaali Venkat and Bala Saravanan. He said Bittu was initially scheduled to be premiered as a television pilot, but due to difficulties, he instead released it as a short film on the internet. When he was working as an assistant director to Atlee in Mersal (2017), the film's star Vijay watched the short and appreciated his work, motivating him to work on an extended version of the pilot film to be his directorial debut.

=== Casting ===
According to Udhayanidhi Stalin, he was the initial choice for the lead role before Sivakarthikeyan was finalised. On 3 February 2021, the makers announced the principal cast of the film which included Priyanka Mohan, S. J. Suryah, and P. Samuthirakani. Priyanka reunited with Sivakarthikeyan in the film, which marked their second collaboration after Doctor. Soori who also collaborated with the actor in several films based on rural settings (Varuthapadaatha Vaalibar Sangam, Rajinimurugan, Seemaraja, and Namma Veettu Pillai), joined for the second time in an urban-setting film, after Maan Karate. The next week, Munishkanth, Bala Saravanan, Kaali Venkat, RJ Vijay, and Sivaangi Krishnakumar (in her acting debut) were also announced as part of the cast. Both Saravanan and Venkat were part of Bittu. Sharing about his role in the film, Vijay said that "I used to stare and look at them performing, forgetting that I myself is an actor in that scene. Don is a big learning experience. I am seeing everything in close quarters and it is a lifetime opportunity."

=== Filming ===
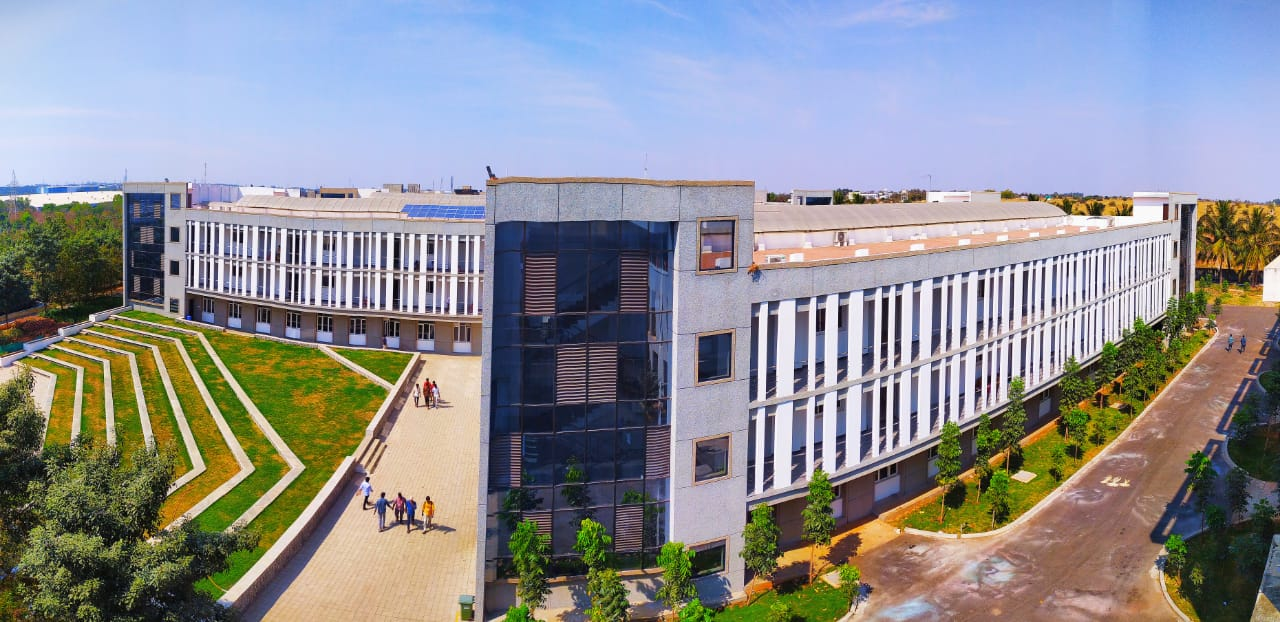
KPR Institute of Engineering and Technology, where integral portions of the film were shot.

Principal photography began on 11 February 2021 at Coimbatore. A launch event for the film took place in Chennai followed by a traditional pooja ceremony, which saw the presence of the film's cast and crew in entirety. Major portions of the film were scheduled to take place at KPR Institute of Engineering and Technology, located in the suburbs of Coimbatore, with the film scheduled to be wrapped in a single stretch of 40 days, with more than 20–25 days were allotted for two schedules each. This schedule started on 15 February and ended on 15 March, which was filmed within 28 days. The team then moved to Chennai, to begin the second filming schedule on 22 March which was completed within 25 days. A song titled "Jalabulajangu" was filmed at the outskirts of Chennai, during this schedule. Choreography performed by Shobi, the actor danced to the track in one leg, similar to the moves that Vijay did in "Valayappatti Thavile" from Azhagiya Tamil Magan (2007), also choreographed by Shobi.

The team intended to start the next schedule of filming, but was halted on late-April 2021 due to the rise in COVID-19 cases in Tamil Nadu. The second schedule began on 15 July 2021 with scenes were mostly in Chennai and its surrounding areas. Additional campus scenes were filmed in Hindustan Institute of Technology and Science in Chennai. With the schedule being wrapped in 24 days, the team headed to Pollachi and Udumalaipettai, to progress the shoot further on 10 August. During filming, the first day shoot was halted after large number of locals gathered at the shooting spot, and the crew did not receive permission from the authorities, since the location is close to the forest boundary. The team were fined ₹19,400 for shooting without permission and overcrowding. In September 2021, the team had completed this schedule and headed to Agra for a song shoot at the Taj Mahal. In October 2021, S. J. Suryah completed all the portions for the film. By then, Sivakarthikeyan had completed shooting for the film, except for one song. After the completion of that track, filming wrapped on 10 December 2021.

=== Post-production ===
Post-production for the film began during 23 September 2021, with the dubbing process. Sivakarthikeyan and Sivaangi Krishnakumar began dubbing for their portions. On 9 November 2021, Sivakarthikeyan tweeted that he had completed the dubbing works of the film in Chennai, despite the bad weather prevailing. In late-December 2021, Chakravarthi had announced that S. J. Suryah had completed dubbing his portions for the film.

== Music ==
Don

Soundtrack album by Anirudh Ravichander
- Released: 12 May 2022
- Recorded: 2021–2022
- Studios: Albuquerque Records, Chennai; Krimson Avenue Studios, Chennai
- Genre: Feature film soundtrack
- Length: 11:04
- Language: Tamil
- Label: Sony Music
- Producer: Anirudh Ravichander

Anirudh Ravichander chronology
Kaathuvaakula Rendu Kaadhal (2022)	Don (2022)	Vikram (2022)

Singles from Don
- 1. "Jalabulajangu" Released: 16 December 2021; 2. "Bae" Released: 3 February 2022; 3. "Private Party" Released: 30 April 2022; 4. "Mudhal Nayagan" Released: 22 July 2022

The film's soundtrack album is composed by Anirudh Ravichander, in his seventh collaboration with Sivakarthikeyan. The lyrics for the songs were written by Vignesh Shivan and Rokesh. Besides acting, Sivakarthikeyan had written lyrics for one of the tracks, which was a duet song. In an interview with Radio Mirchi, Anirudh revealed that the film will feature five songs and will be a youthful album to be appreciated by the masses.

On 16 December 2021, the first single track from the film titled "Jalabulajangu" was released by Sony Music, which features vocals written by Rokesh and sung by the composer himself. It is a college dance number, infused with campus band tune with heavy beats. In the year-end review for Cinema Express, Avinash Ramachandran's article about Jukebox 2021, mentioned the track regarding the use of trending and popular words in film songs.

The second single "Bae" was released on 3 February 2022. Written by Vignesh Shivan, the track was sung by Adithya RK. The third single "Private Party" was released on 30 April 2022. K. M. Bhaskaran, the cinematographer spoke about the filming of the song: "It was planned aesthetically from the beginning. Private Party was one of the firsts for Sivakarthikeyan when it came to costumes and sets. We went with neon lighting and different layers of colours like green, blue and red. The art direction team was on the same page as well".

Tamil
No.	Title	Lyrics	Singer(s)	Length
1.	"Jalabulajangu"	Rokesh	Anirudh Ravichander	3:25
2.	"Bae"	Vignesh Shivan	Adithya RK	4:04
3.	"Private Party"	Sivakarthikeyan	Anirudh Ravichander, Jonita Gandhi	3:36
4.	"Mudhal Naayagan"	Vivek	Ananthkrrishnan	2:24
Total length:				13.29

Telugu
No.	Title	Lyrics	Singer(s)	Length
1.	"Jalabulajangu"	Sri Sai Kiran	Nakash Aziz	3:25
2.	"Bae"	Srinivasa Mouli	Adithya RK	4:04
3.	"Private Party"	Srinivasa Moorthy	Sreerama Chandra, Sahithi Chaganti	3:36
Total length:				11.04

== Release ==
=== Theatrical ===
Don was initially reported to be released in the Valentine's Day weekend of 14 February 2022, and later 17 February 2022, to coincide with Sivakarthikeyan's birthday. However, in late-January 2022, the film was confirmed to be released on 25 March 2022. The release was postponed in order to avoid clashing with RRR being scheduled to release on the same date, and a new release date of 13 May 2022 was announced later. The film was finally released theatrically on that date along with a Telugu dubbed version titled College Don. The distribution rights of the film in Tamil Nadu were acquired by Red Giant Movies.

=== Marketing ===
The film's trailer launch and pre-release event was held in early May at Jeppiar College at Chennai with most of the cast and crew attending the pre-release event of the film.

=== Home media ===
Don began streaming on Netflix from 10 June 2022, and Don was premiered on Kalaignar TV on 24 October 2022 on the occasion of Diwali.

== Reception ==
=== Box office ===
On the first day of its release, the film grossed over ₹16 crore at the domestic box office. According to reports from Pinkvilla, the film collected over ₹8.5 crore in Tamil Nadu, ₹75 lakhs in Karnataka, ₹50 lakhs in Andhra Pradesh and Telangana states, and ₹20 lakhs in rest of India.

According to reports from Times of India, the film after two days of its theatrical run, has grossed around ₹15 crore. On the third day of its release, the film crossed the box office collection of ₹30 crore mark. On the fourth and the fifth day of its release, the film grossed ₹47.50 and ₹44.50 crores worldwide respectively. The Telugu version, College Don grossed ₹3.10 crore on the fifth day of its release. By the second week of its theatrical release, the film had grossed ₹100 crore. It concluded its theatrical run with worldwide gross estimated to be ₹110 crore.

=== Critical response ===
Don received positive reviews from critics.

Praveen Sudevan of The Hindu gave Don a negative review: "After a stoic detour from Doctor, Sivakarthikeyan is back laughing and crying, singing and dancing, but he still cannot salvage Don's humdrum affair". Janani K. of India Today gave 3 out of 5 stars stating that "Don is a mindless entertainer with a moving message. With brilliant comedy sequences and pulsating songs, Don is strictly a theatre watch". Soundarya Athimuthu of The Quint gave 3.5 out of 5 stars and wrote that " 'Don' Is Full of Cliches, but Still Worth a Watch". Ashameera Aiyappan of Firstpost rated the film 2.5 out of 5, stating, "It aims to speak of the well-oiled processing machine that our education system is. No matter what the input is, the output needs to be the same. It also aspires to speak of the steadfast faith Indian parents have in this system. But for a film with such lofty ideals, Don's writing rarely engages with nuance. It only deals with extremes".

M Suganth of The Times of India gave 3 out of 5 stars and wrote that "Cibi Chakaravarthi's conviction and Anirudh's vibrant score carry the film over the finishing line and ensure that despite the somewhat formulaic treatment of this material (it is clearly influenced by the films of the early 2000s), the film remains largely entertaining". Haricharan Pudipeddi of Hindustan Times stated, "As you walk out of the movie, you're left on an emotional high and that makes you overlook the largely predictable first half of the movie. Even though you can sense how the film will end, it still leaves a lasting impact. Samuthirakani walks away with all the brownie points for his moving performance as a father who gives up on his own dreams to make sure his son stays happy. It's not something we haven't seen before but it's likeable and highly relatable".

Sudhir Srinivasan of Cinema Express gave the film 3 out of 5 stars, stating, "Don may have the exterior of a fun, college film, but its core is made of solid emotion. Though our sympathies lie with Chakravarthy, the film remembers that he's still a naïve, college student, who lacks the capacity to see the bigger picture". Manoj Kumar R of The Indian Express gave the film 3 out of 5 stars, stating, "The coming-of-age campus drama is all about the protagonist learning there are no villains in his life. There are only well-meaning people with different life experiences. The guilt trip in Don is enormous, it may even well up your eyes a few times. But, it all ends well and leaves you with a good mood and satisfaction, something that we have missed in movies for a long time".

Ranjana Krishnakumar of Film Companion, stated that the "real miracle" of Don was Sivakarthikeyan: "He sells the hell out of the film with bucketloads of earnestness. He brings vulnerability, and therefore likeability, to a character that could easily have had shades of arrogance. He is so amused by his own antics that we don't see how silly and easy they turn out to be. He dances like an absolute charm radiating joyful energy. He makes the humour work. He performs mimicry in a delightfully natural course of the film. He acts more than his money's worth. In the hands of any other actor in Tamil cinema today, Don would have been a painfully mediocre film. In Sivakarthikeyan's hands, it's a forgivably mediocre one". Ananda Vikatan rated the film 42 out of 100. S Subhakeerthana of OTTplay gave the film 3.5 out of 5, stating, "All in all, an enjoyable film—Don keeps the audience glued till the end! This Sivakarthikeyan-starrer is definitely worth a trip to the theatres. By the way, keep some tissues by your side! I bet you’d use them during the climax portions."

== Controversies ==
Don has received criticism for seemingly glorifying the concept of toxic parenting. Samuthirakani's character Ganesan was compared unfavourably to that of Nassar's from Em Magan (2006), and the closing text "Celebrate your parents when they are with you" received widespread criticism due to the amount of abuse and non-affection Sivakarthikeyan's character receives from his father throughout the narrative.

== Accolades ==
Ceremony	Date of ceremony	Category	Recipient(s)	Result	Ref.
15th Edison Awards	7 January 2023	Best Debut Director	Cibi Chakaravarthi	Won	
Ananda Vikatan Cinema Awards	30 March 2023	Best Villain – Male	S. J. Suryah	Nominated	
Ananda Vikatan Cinema Awards	30 March 2023	Best Debut Director	Cibi Chakaravarthi	Nominated	
Ananda Vikatan Cinema Awards	30 March 2023	Best Choreographer	Shobi Paulraj	Nominated	
Ananda Vikatan Cinema Awards	30 March 2023	Best Comedian – Male	Soori	Nominated	
Ananda Vikatan Cinema Awards	30 March 2023	Best Comedian – Male	Bala Saravanan	Nominated	
11th South Indian International Movie Awards	15–16 September 2023	Best Actor in a Negative Role	S. J. Suryah	Won	
11th South Indian International Movie Awards	15–16 September 2023	Best Debut Director	Cibi Chakaravarthi	Nominated	
11th South Indian International Movie Awards	15–16 September 2023	Best Comedian	Soori	Nominated	
