= Yagavarayinum Naa Kaakka =

2015 Indian film by Sathya Prabhas Pinisetty

Yagavarayinum Naa Kaakka / Malupu
- Promotional Poster
- Directed by: Sathya Prabhas Pinisetty
- Written by: Sathya Prabhas Pinisetty
- Produced by: Ravi Raja Pinisetty
- Starring: Aadhi Pinisetty; Nikki Galrani; Mithun Chakraborty
- Cinematography: Shanmugasundaram
- Edited by: V. J. Sabu Joseph
- Music by: Prasan Praveen Shyam
- Production company: Adharsha Chitralaya
- Distributed by: Global United Media
- Release dates: 26 June 2015 (Tamil); 19 February 2016 (Telugu)
- Running time: 151 minutes (Tamil); 159 minutes (Telugu)
- Country: India
- Languages: Tamil; Telugu

Yagavarayinum Naa Kaakka (transl. Whoever it is, hold your tongue) / Malupu (transl. Turning point) is a 2015 Indian Tamil-Telugu bilingual comedy mystery thriller film written and directed by Sathya Prabhas Pinisetty. The film stars his brother Aadhi Pinisetty and Nikki Galrani in the lead role, alongside Mithun Chakraborty, Richa Pallod and Pasupathy play supporting roles.

Yagavarayinum Naa Kaakka is based on a real incident happened in Chennai and tells the story of a happy go lucky man and the shocking incident that turns his life upside down and his search for Mumbai based underworld don Mudaliar. Malupu, the Telugu version of the film was released on February 19, 2016. The film was shot in different locations for the Tamil and Telugu versions, which caused a delay in the release of Malupu. The film generally opened to mixed response from critics.

== Plot ==
=== 31 December 2014 ===
A young woman tries to call the emergency hotline to save her before she is murdered in a flat in Chennai (Tamil)/Visakhapatnam (Telugu). Someone is shown covering up the crime.

=== Present day ===
Sathish Ganapathy aka Saga (Aadhi Pinisetty), a regular, middle-class college student from Chennai arrives in Mumbai to meet Mudaliar (Mithun Chakraborty), the city's underworld don and protector of the poor. At around the same time, Mudaliar is rushed to the hospital after he is almost killed in an assassination attempt. A mob assembles before his house and demands he shows up to prove he is alive. When he finally does appear, the crowd is grateful for his survival and pray for his well-being.

=== Four months ago ===
Saga and his three wealthy friends skip their finals on purpose, so that they can continue to stay in college and enjoy themselves rather than face adulthood. Despite being warned by his parents to stay away from his friends as they are a bad influence on him, Saga hangs out with them. He finally decides to turn over a new life after Kayal (Nikki Galrani), the girl he falls in love with, convinces his father that Saga can be a responsible adult if given the chance. His parents then put him in charge of his sister's wedding arrangements before leaving for their hometown to meet relatives.

=== 31 December 2014 ===
With his family out of town, Saga follows his three friends for a night in the city to celebrate New Year's Eve. At a restaurant, two of his friends are drunk and get into a fight with a girl named Priya and her boyfriend, Surya. When the police come to resolve the ruckus, they realise that Saga's third friend is the son of the police commissioner and decides to arrest Surya instead. Priya protests and is publicly humiliated by the police inspector, without knowing who she is. She then warns Saga and his friends to go into hiding as they will not live to see the light of day.

=== 1 January 2015 ===
By midnight, Saga and his friends come to know that Priya is actually the daughter of Mudaliar. Her brother, Guna, who runs Mudaliar's businesses in Chennai (Tamil)/Visakhapatnam (Telugu) is after them for revenge. Saga's friends try to convince him to follow them into hiding as arranged by their wealthy and influential fathers, but he insists on staying to arrange for his sister's wedding. Later that morning, Saga is chased down by Guna's men while in town. He is finally saved by Deva, Guna's henchman who realises that Saga saved his brother's life once. Deva advises Saga to go to Mumbai to meet Mudaliar in person and explain everything since he is a sensible man, unlike Guna.

=== Present day ===
Saga goes to Mudaliar's home and claims that Guna sent him. When it is discovered he is lying, he is tortured since he is suspected of the assassination attempt on Mudaliar. Saga finally gets to meet Mudaliar and explains the truth of what happened that night in Chennai. However, Mudaliar drops a bombshell by saying that after Priya bailed out Surya from the police station that night, both of them went missing and have not been seen since. Since Saga and his friends were the last to see the couple alive, they are the prime suspects. Saga refuses to reveal his friends' whereabouts until Mudaliar threatens to have his family killed. Mudaliar then gives Saga some time to find his friends or else his family will die.

With Kayal and Deva's help, Saga finds out where his friends are hiding. In between, Saga is being attacked by a person in a purdah. As Saga cannot see his face, he is unable to catch his attacker. Saga goes into hiding as he suspects that he is being targeted by the father of one of his friends, in order to keep their identities safe. The attacker then tries to kill Deva and runs away. In the process, he begins to suspect that their fathers are trying to frame him for Priya's disappearance to save their sons. This forces Saga to reveal his friends' hideouts to Mudaliar, who releases his family. Saga then visits Deva in the hospital who is receiving treatment. Deva hands Saga a paper that has a symbol and says the attacker had this symbol tattooed in his hand. After much thinking, Saga realises that he saw such a tattoo on Surya's forearm and he might know about Priya's whereabouts and goes to his flat. Once there, he finds Surya's frozen body being kept by Surya's psychotic ex-girlfriend, Nila who also has the same tattoo on her hand. It is then revealed that she killed both Surya and Priya on New Year's Eve out of jealousy. Before Saga can take Nila to meet Mudaliar, she is killed by Deva's brother, leaving Saga with no alternative to convince the don of the truth. At around the same time, Mudaliar and Guna find Priya's body washed up on the beach.

Once his men have rounded up Saga and his friends, Mudaliar orders Guna and their men to kill them. However, the friend who tried to hit on Priya and caused the whole misunderstanding finally admits his mistake to Mudaliar and pleads for his friends' release in return for his life. Moved by the young man's deed, Mudaliar lets the four friends go as he realises they couldn't have killed his daughter as they were willing to sacrifice their life for their friends.

== Cast ==
- Aadhi Pinisetty as Sathish "Saga" Ganapathy
- Nikki Galrani as Kayal
- Mithun Chakraborty as Mudaliar (Voice dubbed by Nizhalgal Ravi)
- Richa Pallod as Priya
- Lakshmi Priyaa Chandramouli as Nila
- Pasupathy as Kasimedu Deva
- Harish Uthaman as Guna Mudaliar
- Nassar as Commissioner Balachander (Chandrasekhar in Telugu version)
- Aadukalam Naren as Krishnan, Sathish's father
- Pragathi as Sathish's mother
- Kitty as Mudaliar's assistant
- Mahadevan as Minister Duraiarasan
- Munishkanth as Mudaliar's Henchmen
- Shravan as Suriya
- Shyam Kumar as Rajesh
- Shree Karthick as Shiva
- Siddharth Gopinath as Kishore
- Bose Venkat as Assistant Commissioner Khan
- Anand Varma
- Mohan Raman as Doctor
- Anitha Iyer as Roshini, Sathish's sister
- Rajasimman as Deva's henchman
- Sabarna as Sabarna (Sabu)
- Japan Kumar (special appearance in "Sokkanu Ponnu"/"Chalaki Pilla")
- Heena Panchal as item number

== Soundtrack ==
The music was composed by Prasan-Praveen-Shyam and released by Think Music India.

Yagavarayinum Naa Kaakka

Soundtrack album by Prasan-Praveen-Shyam
- Released: June 10, 2015
- Recorded: 2015
- Genre: Soundtrack
- Length: 26:02
- Label: Think Music India
- Producer: Prasan-Praveen-Shyam

Prasan-Praveen-Shyam chronology
Yagavarayinum Naa Kaakka (2015)	Kaadhali (2017)

Yagavarayinum Naa Kaakka (Tamil)

Tamil Track list
No.	Title	Lyrics	Singer(s)	Length
1.	"Papparapampam"	Madhan Karky	Benny Dayal, Krishna Iyer, M. M. Manasi	5:26
2.	"Sokkana Ponnu"	Gana Ulaganathan	Aadhi Pinisetty	5:35
3.	"Nee Sonna"	Thamarai	Krishna Iyer	2:45
4.	"Singari Sokku Lady"	Krishna Iyer	Priya Himesh, Krishna Iyer	5:11
5.	"Oozhi Koothu"	Thamarai	Dr. Narayanan	4:51
6.	"Thozha Thozha"	Madhan Karky	Elfe Choir	1:54
7.	"YNK" (Theme)		Krishna Iyer	0:20
Total length:				26:02

Malupu (Telugu)

Malupu

Soundtrack album by Prasan-Praveen-Shyam
- Released: June 14, 2015
- Recorded: 2015
- Genre: Soundtrack
- Length: 26:04
- Label: Think Music India
- Producer: Prasan-Praveen-Shyam

Prasan-Praveen-Shyam chronology
Malupu (2015)	Kaadhali (2017)

Telugu Track list
No.	Title	Lyrics	Singer(s)	Length
1.	"Papparapampam"	Ramajogayya Sastry	Ranjith, Krishna Iyer	5:27
2.	"Chalaki Pilla"	Bhuvana Chandra	Aadhi Pinisetty	5:35
3.	"Nuvvena Ee Matannadhi"	Ramajogayya Sastry	Krishna Iyer	2:46
4.	"Avo Avo Gopalaa"	Bhuvana Chandra	Priya Himesh, Krishna Iyer	5:11
5.	"Bhagaa Bhagaa"	Ramajogayya Sastry	Haricharan	4:51
6.	"Lene Ledu"	Ramajogayya Sastry	Haricharan	1:54
7.	"Vaadu Veedu Evadainaa"	Ramajogayya Sastry	Krishna Iyer	0:20
Total length:				26:04

== Critical response ==
The Times of India gave the film 2.5 stars out of 5 and wrote, "There are films whose twists in the script make them unpredictable and interesting and there are films that have one twist too many and end up exasperating us. Yaagavarayinum Naa Kaakka belongs in the latter category". The Hindu wrote, "when the film does eventually begin in the second half, there's quite a lot to like...Some subtlety could've been nice towards the end, as there's too much emotion being milked with over-the-top performances and extra-poignant loud music. But that's not really the film’s biggest problem. It is that it doesn't start until you return from the interval break".

Behindwoods rated the film 2.75 out of 5 and felt "it was one movie that’s justified by everything in-store to define it with the parliamentary term called commercial cinema, but also creates an impactful experience in the end."They lauded actor Mithun Chakraborty saying "Mithun Da anchored the film on one side with his mightiness". Sify called the film "average" and wrote, "too many songs look unnecessary and the length of the film is a drawback...everything about the film feels rehashed and redundant". Indiaglitz gave the Telugu version of the film, a rating of 3/5 stars, calling it as a one time watch mystery film with gripping screenplay, especially in the second half, appreciating the performances of Richa Pallod, Mithun Chakraborty, Aadhi Pinisetty and Pasupathy. They also lauded the technical crew of the film.
