= Oka V Chitram =

Oka 'V' Chitram
- VCD cover
- Directed by: Teja
- Written by: Teja
- Produced by: Dasari Narayana Rao
- Starring: Aadhi Pinisetty; Vamsi Krishna; Poonam Kaur; Madhu Shalini
- Cinematography: S. Sundeep Reddy
- Edited by: Shankar
- Music by: Sri Murali
- Production company: Siri Media Pvt Ltd
- Release date: 19 May 2006
- Running time: 153 Minutes
- Country: India
- Language: Telugu

Oka V Chitram (styled Oka 'V' Chitram) (transl. A 'V' film/An oddity) is a 2006 Indian Telugu-language comedy film written and directed by Teja, and produced by Dasari Narayana Rao and Siri Media Pvt Ltd. It stars Aadhi Pinisetty, Vamsi Krishna, Poonam Kaur and Madhu Shalini. The music was composed by Sri Murali. The film is inspired by the American film Bowfinger and the Malayalam film Udayananu Tharam. Aadhi Pinisetty made his acting debut in the film under the name Pradeep Pinisetty.

== Cast ==
- Aadhi Pinisetty as P. Balaram
- Vamsi Krishna as Santosh Babu
- Poonam Kaur as Deepa
- Madhu Shalini as Supraja
- Pooja Bharti as Supriya
- Tanikella Bharani as Devam
- Krishna Bhagavaan as Cameraman Krishna
- Shakuntala as Lakshmamma
- Satyam Rajesh as Free Free, a poet
- Madhunandan as Microsoft
- Raghu Babu as PP Pulla Rao
- Srinivasa Reddy as Balaram's friend Mahi
- M. S. Narayana as Dr. Gasagasa Rao
- Duvvasi Mohan as Head Constable
- Ravi Prakash as Supraja's husband
- Rallapalli as Balaram's boss
- Bharath Reddy as Bharath
- Kondavalasa Lakshmana Rao
- Lakshmipathi as Saloon Samba
- Jeeva as Costume shop owner
- Ambati Srinivas as Watchman
- Jayavani as Supriya's mother
- Banerjee as Police Officer
- Ahuti Prasad as Santosh Babu's lawyer
- Bandla Ganesh as Santosh Babu's driver
- Sudhakar Komakula as Aspiring Actor
- Bill Bitra

== Soundtrack ==
Music composed by Sri Murali. The song “Amigo” was screened at the Visual Effects Society Festival.

Oka V Chitram

Soundtrack album by Sri Murali
- Released: 2006
- Genre: Feature film soundtrack

No.	Title	Singer(s)	Length
1.	"Titanic"	Sowmya Raoh, Irfan Ali, Teja	04:48
2.	"Chandramukhi"	Sowmya Raoh, Khushi Murali	04:29
3.	"Sugreeva"	Sowmya Raoh, Naveen Madhav	04:16
4.	"Amigo"	Sowmya Raoh	04:35
5.	"Manasa"	Sowmya Raoh	04:48
6.	"Kukka Mokham"	Sowmya Raoh, Rimi Tomy and Siva Ganesh	03:38
Total length:			27:05

== Release ==
A critic from The Hindu wrote that "Teja has come out with a novel idea and tries to prove that anything is possible, provided one has a positive attitude. However, the idea fails to click and make an impact, looking totally cinematic". A critic from Telugucinema.com wrote that "Oka V Chitram is just an okay film". A critic from Full Hyderabad wrote that "To cut a long story short, this one is the epitome of Teja’s assessment of his audiences".
