= Kuttram 23 =

2017 Indian film by Arivazhagan

- Theatrical release poster
- Directed by: Arivazhagan Venkatachalam
- Screenplay by: Arivazhagan Venkatachalam
- Based on: Enni Ettavathu Naal by Rajesh Kumar
- Produced by: Inder Kumar
- Starring: Arun Vijay; Mahima Nambiar
- Cinematography: K. M. Bhaskaran
- Edited by: Bhuvan Srinivasan
- Music by: Vishal Chandrasekhar
- Production company: Redhan The Cinema People
- Distributed by: Across Films
- Release date: 3 March 2017
- Running time: 134 minutes
- Country: India
- Language: Tamil

Kuttram 23 (transl. Crime 23) is a 2017 Indian Tamil-language action thriller film written and directed by Arivazhagan. Themed on medical crimes, the film stars Arun Vijay and Mahima Nambiar, with Vamsi Krishna, Aravind Akash, Amit Bhargav, Abhinaya, and Thambi Ramaiah, amongst others, in supporting roles. Produced by Inder Kumar along with Arun Vijay, the soundtrack album and background score for the film were composed by Vishal Chandrasekhar. The film was released worldwide on 3 March 2017 and was a success at the box office.

== Plot ==
A woman named Jessica arrives at a church and confesses her sins to a priest. The priest is murdered, while Jessica is abducted.

In Chennai, ACP Vetrimaaran IPS is celebrating the wedding anniversary of his elder brother, Aravind, and sister-in-law, Abhinaya. Vetri's mother berates Abhinaya for not having borne her a grandchild despite many years of marriage. However, after undergoing treatment by a famous fertility specialist, Dr. Tulsi, Abhinaya finally becomes pregnant. While the rest of his family celebrates, Vetri notices that Abhinaya is moody most of the time.

Meanwhile, Vetri is put in charge of Jessica's abduction case and is assisted by Sub-Inspector Thirupathi. He suspects that there is a connection between the priest's murder and Jessica's disappearance. Vetri and Thirupathi visit Thendral, a preschool teacher who was the first witness to the corpse of the dead priest. Thendral's family moves out of the city's outskirts and unknowingly into the apartment opposite Vetri's home. Only then does Vetri realize that her family is arranging a groom for her, and that people will start questioning her morals if the police keep visiting her.

Eventually, Thendral reveals that she saw two vehicles outside the church that day: one belonging to Jessica and another black SUV driven by a group of mysterious young men. Thendral is attacked by a group of thugs driving a similar SUV, but is saved by Vetri. After this incident, Vetri and Thendral start dating and fall for each other. At around the same time, Jessica's body is found at a landfill site, and it is revealed that she was pregnant at the time of her murder. Her husband, the director of a leading TV channel, claims that they have only recently tried to conceive.

Vetri's investigation soon leads them to a petrol bunk close to the church. The CCTV captured the men in the black SUV. At the same time, Thendral notices that the men are outside her apartment. She calls Vetri, who tells her to close all the doors and stay indoors. When Vetri arrives, the men have gone. When he goes home, he finds that Abhinaya has hanged herself. The police concludes that she committed suicide, since there was no sign of intrusion. At her funeral, Abhinaya's mother reveals that a few days ago, Abhinaya had asked her father for ₹50 lakh (US$52,000).

Thendral reveals that one of her doctor friends treated Aravind and Abhinaya and that Aravind is infertile, leading Thendral to theorize that Abhinaya might have been unfaithful. While going through Abhinaya's postmortem report, Vetri realizes that her body contained traces of clomiphene, similar to Jessica's body. After talking to the coroner, Vetri learns that a third young woman matched this pattern. Realizing that Aravind might be hiding something, Vetri confronts him. Aravind admits that he and Abhinaya had opted for an artificial insemination using his own sperm.

Vetri visits Tulsi at the hospital and, on inquiry, realizes she is hiding something. He requests all the files on patients who have undergone artificial insemination at the hospital. He also notices that Kousalya, a famous TV artist, is successfully treated at that hospital. While studying the files, Vetri finds that the documents on artificial insemination patients have an unusual watermark with the number 23. The following day, he visits Kousalya and her husband to ask whether they have been blackmailed recently.

Although the couple denies everything, Vetri asks his team to tap their phones, especially incoming calls. True enough, Kousalya receives a call instructing her to pay a large sum of money to keep quiet about information that could destroy her career. The next day, Vetri and his team shadow the young couple. Kousalya and her husband are seen withdrawing money from a bank and driving through a busy street. Just then, a young man, covering his face, forcefully enters their car and takes the money. By the time Vetri catches up, the man has escaped. However, Vetri's men had placed a tracker on the money bag.

Vetri easily tracks the person to his apartment and overpowers him for interrogation. The person reveals himself as Gaurav and is part of a gang that has been blackmailing several women in the city who have legally undergone artificial insemination at Tulsi's hospital. One of their first victims was Jessica, an ardent cricket fan. She had hired Gaurav's gang to get hold of her favorite cricket player's sperm to conceive his child. However, she soon felt guilty. Feeling that they might get caught, Gaurav killed her and the priest who heard her confession.

The next woman was the politician's daughter-in-law, who slit her own wrists at her baby shower. Her father-in-law wanted his grandson to be a politician like him, so he arranged for her to be inseminated with his own sperm. Finally, there was Abhinaya, who learned from Gaurav's partner, John Matthew, that Tulsi lied about using Aravind's sperm and instead inseminated her with someone else's sperm. John then blackmails Abhinaya for ₹50 lakh (US$52,000), or else he will expose the truth and humiliate her family. Abhinaya finally goes back to Tulsi to get an abortion. When Gaurav's gang learns this, they come to Vetri's house that day, when Thendral sees them. They then killed Abhinaya and arranged for it to look like a suicide. After the confession, Vetri angrily kills Gaurav.

As Vetri and his men head over to the hospital to arrest Tulsi, Vetri suddenly remembers that a few years ago, a man named John Matthew reported that his wife had gone missing. John was upset that his wife did not want to bear his children and instead wanted artificial insemination with a much superior male. A few days later, she was found dead. Since then, John had gone missing. Vetri had one of his men look into John's disappearance. Meanwhile, John is shown to be working as a lab assistant at Tulsi's sperm bank and was the one who had been manipulating the donor's records and passing on the information to Gaurav.

When Tulsi and her husband threaten to have John exposed, he swiftly kills them and leaves. Later that night, Vetri gets a call from John, who has abducted Thendral. Vetri tracks John down and saves Thendral. However, John is a trained fighter and beats up Vetri. John reveals that he arranged for Abhinaya to be inseminated with his own sperm. When he learned that she was planning an abortion, he could not accept it and had Gaurav kill her. While John is ranting, Vetri manages to overpower and kill him. The next day, Vetri and Thendral discuss the misuse of medical advancements on people and the importance of adopting orphans in the media.

== Cast ==
- Arun Vijay as Assistant Commissioner Vetrimaaran IPS
- Mahima Nambiar as Thendral (voice dubbed by M. M. Manasi)
- Vamsi Krishna as John Matthew
- Thambi Ramaiah as SI Thirupathi
- Vijayakumar as Commissioner Kumarasamy IPS
- Abhinaya as Sri Abhinaya
- Amit Bhargav as Aravind
- Aravind Akash as Gaurav
- Misha Ghoshal as Jessica
- Suja Varunee as Nancy
- Neelima Rani as Kousalya
- Kalyani Natarajan as Dr. Tulsi
- K. S. G. Venkatesh as Thendral's father
- Meera Krishnan as Abhinaya's mother
- Aishwarya
- Stunt Silva
- Leo Sivadass as Petrol Bunk Guy
- Gopi Kannadasan

== Production ==
In January 2016, Arun Vijay and director Arivazhagan announced that they would collaborate to work on a "high-octane action thriller" with a medical backdrop, which would begin in the following months. The script was developed in early 2016, with the story being inspired by a novel by writer Rajesh Kumar, which in turn was based on real events. Arivazhagan developed Rajesh Kumar's novel into a screenplay within 15 days of gaining approval from the writer to use the story. A formal launch event was held in March 2016, with Arun Vijay announced that the venture will be produced by his friend, Inder Kumar, under Redhan The Cinema People banner. Due to Arivazhagan's regular collaborator S. Thaman was busy with other commitments and unable to collaborate with him again at that time, Vishal Chandrasekhar was instead signed as the music composer.

In April 2016, the team shot scenes in the dumpyard of Pallikaranai with Arun reportedly working for 36 hours in a single stretch. Following the completion of the schedule, 30% of the film was revealed to be over. Mahima Nambiar joined as the lead actress, while Vamsi Krishna and Amit Bhargav were selected for further supporting roles. By June 2016, 85% of filming was complete. The team finished further sequences in July 2016, while taking a day off to give technicians the opportunity to Kabali (2016) on the day of the release. The shoot finished thereafter, taking 45 days from start to finish and costing 3.5 crore rupees, and a theatrical trailer was released during September 2016.

== Soundtrack ==
Kuttram 23

Soundtrack album by Vishal Chandrasekhar
- Released: 1 September 2016
- Recorded: 2016
- Genre: Feature film soundtrack
- Label: Sony Music India

Vishal Chandrasekhar chronology
Uriyadi (2016)	Kuttram 23 (2016)	Sangili Bungili Kadhava Thorae (2017)

The music and film score was composed by Vishal Chandrasekhar, working with director Arivazhagan for the first time. The audio launch of Kuttram 23 was held on 1 September 2016 at Satyam Cinemas in Chennai.

Track listing
No.	Title	Lyrics	Singer(s)	Length
1.	"Pori Vaithu"	Viveka	Vijay Prakash, Shweta Mohan	4:29
2.	"Mugam Theriyaa"	Viveka	Ranjith	4:03
3.	"Thoduvaanam"	Viveka	Sinduri Vishal	2:25
4.	"K23 Theme"	—	—	3:07
5.	"Pori Vaithu (Karaoke)"	—	—	4:31

== Release and reception ==
Prior to the official release, a premiere was held for media personalities, and the film drew positive reviews. Kuttram 23 was subsequently released on 3 March 2017, and received critical acclaim.

The Hindustan Times noted, "it is brilliantly scripted and directed – and of course ably acted out by especially Vijay". The Deccan Chronicle noted it was "a welcomed relief from the recent drab of Kollywood", while The New Indian Express stated it had a "coherent screenplay which could have been better". Sify's reviewer wrote the film was "a good example of an entertaining cop thriller" adding "this sharply written slick investigative thriller, comes as a huge relief at a time where Tamil audiences are bombarded with several middling movies of big stars" and that "the film is also a perfect case study on how good writing and a technically sound team can offer quality entertainment, which is a rarity in Kollywood". Likewise, Sreedhar Pillai of FirstPost wrote "Kuttram 23 has a compelling story and is packaged in an entertaining format by Arivazhagan" and that "it is one of the better movies in recent times".

Following the release of the film, several Tamil film personalities, including Rajinikanth and Shankar publicly appreciated the film. The film had its television premiere on 24 June 2017 via Zee Tamil.
