= Aadu Puli =

- Promotional poster
- Directed by: Vijay Prakash
- Written by: Vijay Prakash
- Produced by: S. Michael Rayappan
- Starring: Aadhi; Poorna; Prabhu
- Cinematography: Rajavel Olhiveeran
- Edited by: Kishore Te.
- Music by: Sundar C. Babu
- Production company: Global Infotainments
- Release date: 18 February 2011
- Running time: 136 minutes
- Country: India
- Language: Tamil

Aadu Puli (transl. Goat, Tiger) is a 2011 Indian Tamil language action drama film written and directed by newcomer Vijay Prakash and produced by S. Michael Rayappan. The film stars Aadhi, Poorna, and Prabhu, while Suresh, Ravichandran, K. R. Vijaya, Anupama Kumar, and Yuvarani play supporting roles. The music was composed by Sundar C. Babu with editing by Kishore Te and cinematography by Rajavel Olhiveeran. The film was released on 18 February 2011.

== Plot ==
Bhagyanathan (Prabhu) is a crazy fan of M. G. Ramachandran and has named his son Idhayakani (Aadhi). Idhayakani is a nice guy who watches movies, plays basketball, flirts with girls like Anjali (Poorna), and has a happy family consisting of his father, loving mother Kalaiarasi (Anupama), sister, grandfather Sabapathy (Ravichandran), and grandmother Sampoornam (K. R. Vijaya). However, Thillainayagam (Suresh), Anjali's father, is a cunning minister and ruthless politician who wants to be the next CM by hook or crook. He does not approve of Idhayakanni as his future son-in-law and has an army of goondas like Paal Pandi ready to take on his enemies. How our larger than life hero wages a one-man battle against the evil minister and his henchmen forms the rest of the story.

== Cast ==
- Aadhi as Idhayakani Bhagyanathan
- Prabhu as Bhagyanathan
- Poorna as Anjali Thillainayagam
- Suresh as Thillainayagam
- Ravichandran as Sabapathy
- K. R. Vijaya as Sampoornam
- Mayilsamy as Thillainayagam's assistant
- Singamuthu
- Soori as Karuppu
- Nizhalgal Ravi
- Manikka Vinayagam
- Srinath as Idhayakanni's friend
- Yuvarani as Mrs. Thillainayagam
- Anupama Kumar as Kalaiarasi Bhagyanathan

== Soundtrack ==
Soundtrack was composed by Sundar C. Babu, with lyrics written by Vaali, Viveka, Yugabharathi, V. Prakash, and Kalaikumar.

- "Oorellam" – Shankar Mahadevan
- "Satham Illai" – SPB
- "Annakkili" – Karthik, Chinmayi
- "Koppayil" – Naveen
- "Thodugiral" – Suchithra, Jyotsna
- "Unnai Ninaithadume" – Hariharan, Sujatha Mohan
- "Boyse Google" – Krish, Rita Thyagarajan

== Reception ==
Rediff wrote "Aadu Puli is just another masala flick that's simply not spicy enough." Sify wrote "Aadu Puli is strictly for those who love their daily dose of mass masala movie masquerading as a family entertainer".
