= Tamil Rockerz =

Indian Tamil-language streaming television series

- Poster
- Genre: Thriller
- Written by: Manoj Kumar Kalaivanan
- Directed by: Arivazhagan Venkatachalam
- Starring: Arun Vijay; Vani Bhojan
- Country of origin: India
- Original language: Tamil
- No. of seasons: 1
- No. of episodes: 8

Production
- Producers: Aruna Guhan; Aparna Guhan
- Production location: India
- Cinematography: Rajesh Manjunath
- Editor: V. J. Sabu Joseph
- Running time: 40-50 min
- Production company: AVM

Original release
- Network: SonyLIV
- Release: 19 August 2022

Tamil Rockerz is an Indian Tamil-language streaming television series written and directed by Arivazhagan Venkatachalam under the banner of AVM. The film stars Arun Vijay and Vani Bhojan. The series' story is based on the torrent site Tamil Rockers.

== Plot ==
Rudra to head a special team, consisting of cyber forensic officer Sandhya, cyber crime SI Bhanu and inspector Nelson, to find Tamil Rockerz and prevent GOAT to be released by them.

== Cast ==
- Arun Vijay as Rudhra IPS
- Vani Bhojan as Sandhya Venugopal
- Iswarya Menon as Keerthana
- Vinodhini Vaidyanathan as Bhanu
- Johnny as Director Iniyan
- Vinod Sagar as Nelson
- Azhagam Perumal as Madhi
- Marimuthu as Madhi's assistant

== Episodes ==
No.	Title	Directed by	Written by	Original release date
1	"The Pirates of The Kodambakkam"	Arivazhagan Venkatachalam	Manoj Kumar Kalaivanan	19 August 2022
2	"Aye, Aye, Captain"	Arivazhagan Venkatachalam	Manoj Kumar Kalaivanan	19 August 2022
3	"The Gossip Protocol"	Arivazhagan Venkatachalam	Manoj Kumar Kalaivanan	19 August 2022
4	"Seed and Leech"	Arivazhagan Venkatachalam	Manoj Kumar Kalaivanan	19 August 2022
5	"Dead Men Tell No Tales"	Arivazhagan Venkatachalam	Manoj Kumar Kalaivanan	19 August 2022
6	"Peer Tracker"	Arivazhagan Venkatachalam	Manoj Kumar Kalaivanan	19 August 2022
7	"Walk The Plank"	Arivazhagan Venkatachalam	Manoj Kumar Kalaivanan	19 August 2022
8	"Shiver Me Timbers"	Arivazhagan Venkatachalam	Manoj Kumar Kalaivanan	19 August 2022

== Reception ==
A critic from The Hindu opined that "'Tamil Rockerz' season 1 review: Predictable storytelling that wastes potential". A critic from The Indian Express wrote that "The creators of Tamil Rockerz deserve credit for turning the gaze inwards. The series shines the light on the moral and ethical bankruptcy of the industry that breeds all sorts of problems". A critic from Hindustan Times said that "Arivazhagan's web series [sic] has the potential, but the treatment of the story is so generic that it fails to keep one invested". Arun Anthony of Deccan Herald gave the film 2 out of 5 stars and said "The story is muddled with many subplots and overly emotional sequences that make the viewer lose connection with the narrative."
