= Vallinam =

2014 Indian film by Arivazhagan

- Theatrical release poster
- Directed by: Arivazhagan
- Written by: Arivazhagan
- Produced by: V. Ravichandran
- Starring: Nakul; Mrudhula Bhaskar; Atul Kulkarni; Siddhu Jonnalagadda
- Cinematography: K. M. Bhaskaran
- Edited by: V. J. Sabu Joseph
- Music by: Thaman S
- Production company: Aascar Films
- Release date: 28 February 2014
- Running time: 146 minutes
- Country: India
- Language: Tamil

Vallinam (transl. Hardness) is a 2014 Indian Tamil-language sports film written and directed by Arivazhagan and produced by V. Ravichandran. The film stars Nakul and newcomer Mrudhula Bhaskar, while Atul Kulkarni, Siddhu Jonnalagadda, Anaswara Kumar, Amzath Khan, and Jagan play supporting roles. The music was composed by Thaman S with cinematography by K. M. Bhaskaran and editing by V. J. Sabu Joseph. The film was released on 28 February 2014. Sabu Joseph received the National Film Award for Best Editing at the 61st National Film Awards.

== Plot ==
Krishna and Shiva are childhood friends studying in the same college and prominent basketball players preparing for a national-level basketball tournament. Following the events of the college, Shiva dies from a heart attack because he was hit by a basketball shot by Krishna. This makes Krishna end his college career. He then joins a new college where a basketball game is teased by a cricket team there. The story lines up when Krishna takes on basketball again and wins the national-level tournament.

== Cast ==
- Nakul as Krishna
- Mrudhula Bhaskar as Meera
- Atul Kulkarni as Coach
- Siddhu Jonnalagadda as Vamsi
- Anaswara Kumar as Anu
- Amzath Khan as Guna
- Jagan as Jagan
- Jayaprakash as Krishnamurthy
- Santhana Bharathi as Puzhaldasan
- Saravana Prakash as Balaji
- Y. Gee. Mahendra as Venkatachalam
- Anupama Kumar
- Mathivanan Rajendran
- Mippu as Train passenger
- Sampath Ram
- Kreshna as Shiva (cameo)
- Aadhi as Basketball coach (cameo)
- RJ Balaji as Show host (cameo)

== Production ==
Vallinam is Arivazhagan's second directorial after Eeram (2009). K. M. Bhaskaran made his debut as cinematographer. V. Ravichandran of Aascar Films agreed to produce the film after Arivazhagan spent a year seeking producers. Nakul, the lead actor, underwent special training to portray the role of a basketball player, wanting to "live the character rather than to act". Bindu Madhavi was initially signed to portray the lead actress. However, she was dropped from the project since the director and the crew were not impressed with her performance. She was subsequently replaced film by a newcomer Mrudhula Bhaskar. Atul Kulkarni was cast as an antagonistic coach as Arivazhagan felt he had the perfect looks and physique required. Siddhu Jonnalagadda was selected to play another antagonist after Arivazhagan spotted him on a poster of Life Before Wedding (2011) while scouting locations with Praveen Sattaru in Hyderabad.

The film faced production delays due to various factors such as changes in weather and the makers' struggles to acquire permission to film in the desired locations. During production, the makers ran into crowd trouble with students attempting to get autographs from Nakul when he was preparing for the shoot, they were subsequently prevented in doing so from the crew of the film, prompting a student protest. The team worked for 72 hours continuously for an action scene which was shot on a train as the director wanted to "match the call sheets of the artists with the availability of the train". A set used for the climax cost ₹1.25 crore (equivalent to ₹2.4 crore or US$250,000 in 2023). The makers also imported a basketball court mat from the United States for ₹35 lakh (equivalent to ₹66 lakh or US$69,000 in 2023).

== Soundtrack ==
The soundtrack was composed by Thaman S, and was launched on 11 March 2013.

Track listing
No.	Title	Lyrics	Singer(s)	Length
1.	"Maaman Machaan"	Viveka	Silambarasan, Thaman S, Mukesh Mohamed	4:52
2.	"Uyiril Uyiril"	Viveka	Haricharan	4:49
3.	"Nakula"	Parvathi	Nakul, Andrea Jeremiah	3:15
4.	"Uyiril Uyiril" (Reprise)	Viveka	S. Thaman	2:34
5.	"Vallinam"	Vaali	Palakkad Sreeram, Rahul Nambiar, Naveen Madhav, Ranjith	3:42
Total length:				19:12

== Release and reception ==
Vallinam was initially scheduled to release on 24 January 2014, but ultimately released on 28 February 2014. Baradwaj Rangan wrote in The Hindu, "Arivazhagan isn’t a lazy filmmaker, and at a time when most Tamil films have begun to look like flatly lit television serials, without the slightest interest in framing and staging, this quality cannot be underestimated". M Suganth of The Times of India wrote, "It is an idealistic film, yes, but what makes Vallinam a commendable effort is that it doesn't resort to cricket-bashing to drive home its point [...] The filmmaking too is a bit heavy-handed here when a little bit of understatement would have been welcome".

== Accolades ==
At the 61st National Film Awards, V. J. Sabu Joseph won the award for Best Editing.
