= Aadhi Pinisetty =

Indian actor (born 1982)

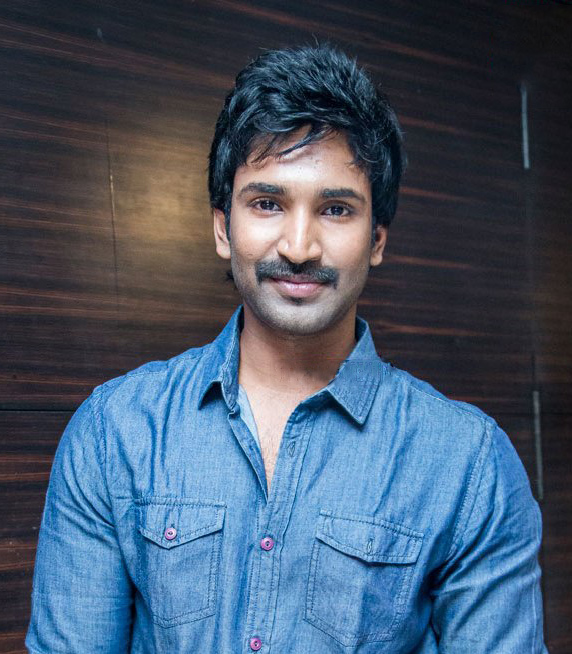
- Pinisetty in 2017
- Born: Sai Pradeep Kumar; 14 December 1982 (age 43); Chennai, Tamil Nadu, India
- Occupation: Actor
- Years active: 2006–present
- Spouse: Nikki Galrani (m. 2022)
- Parent: Ravi Raja Pinisetty (father)

Sai Pradeep Kumar (born 14 December 1982), his stage name as Aadhi Pinisetty, is an Indian actor who appears in Tamil and Telugu films. He is the recipient of a Nandi Award and a SIIMA Award, in addition to two nominations for Filmfare Awards South.

Born to film director Ravi Raja Pinisetty, he debuted in 2006 with the Telugu film Oka V Chitram. His first prominent role was in the Tamil film Eeram (2009), produced by director S. Shankar.

== Early life ==
Aadhi Pinisetty was born into a Telugu-speaking family. His father, Ravi Raja Pinisetty has directed over 50 films. He grew up in Chennai and was schooled at Don Bosco.

== Career ==
Pinisetty made his debut in 2006 with the Teja-directed Oka V Chitram. He later appeared in the Tamil film Mirugam (2007). In 2009, he starred in the supernatural thriller Eeram. In 2010, he had two releases, Ayyanar and Aadu Puli, which were commercial films and were average grossers, building his commercial value well despite the negative reviews. His next films were Aravaan (2012), Gundello Godari (2013), Vallinam (2014) and Kochadaiyaan (2014) Yagavarayinum Naa Kaakka (2015). He has been the successful film, Sarrainodu (2016), for which he got critical acclaim, with one reviewer commenting that Aadhi's screen presence elevates the film. In 2017, he starred in the thriller Maragadha Naanayam, which turned out to be a surprise box office success. The same year he starred in the Telugu romantic-drama film Ninnu Kori, alongside Nani. His portrayal as Arun in the latter was well reviewed by one reviewer. In 2018, he appeared in Telugu films with Agnyaathavaasi, Rangasthalam, Neevevaro and the bilingual U Turn.

In 2022, he was cast in the sports comedy film Good Luck Sakhi as well as the bilingual movies Clap and The Warriorr. In 2023, Aadhi and Hansika both deliver performances in line with their roles requirements in the Tamil science-fiction crime comedy film, Partner. In 2025, he was seen in the horror thriller Sabdham; followed by the television serial Mayasabha as well as two Telegu films, Akhanda 2: Thaandavam and Drive.

== Personal life ==
In March 2022, Pinisetty got engaged to his long-time girlfriend and actress Nikki Galrani with whom he co-starred in Yagavarayinum Naa Kaakka (2015) and Maragadha Naanayam (2017). They married on 18 May 2022 in a private function attended by close family and friends.

== Filmography ==
Key
†	Denotes films that have not yet been released

Year	Title	Role	Language	Notes	Ref.
2006	Oka V Chitram	P. Balaram	Telugu	Credited as Pradeep Pinisetty	
2007	Mirugam	Ayyanar	Tamil		
2009	Eeram	ACP Vasudevan	Tamil		
2010	Ayyanar	Prabha / Ayyanar	Tamil		
2011	Aadu Puli	Idhayakanni	Tamil		
2012	Aravaan	Varipuli / Chinna	Tamil		
2013	Gundello Godari	Malli	Telugu		
2014	Vallinam	Basketball coach	Tamil	Cameo appearance	
2014	Kochadaiiyaan	Veera Mahendran	Tamil		
2015	Yagavarayinum Naa Kaakka	Saga	Tamil	Bilingual film	
2015	Malupu	Saga	Telugu	Bilingual film	
2016	Sarrainodu	Vairam Dhanush	Telugu		
2017	Maragadha Naanayam	Senguttuvan	Tamil		
2017	Ninnu Kori	Arun	Telugu		
2018	Agnyaathavaasi	Seetharam	Telugu		
2018	Rangasthalam	Chelluboina Kumar Babu	Telugu		
2018	Neevevaro	Kalyan	Telugu		
2018	U Turn	SI Nayak	Tamil	Bilingual film	
2018	U Turn	SI Nayak	Telugu	Bilingual film	
2019	Ranarangam	Afgani's son	Telugu		
2022	Good Luck Sakhi	Goli Raju	Telugu		
2022	Clap	Kathir	Tamil	Bilingual film	
2022	Clap	Vishnu	Telugu	Bilingual film	
2022	The Warriorr	Guru	Tamil	Bilingual film	
2022	The Warriorr	Guru	Telugu	Bilingual film	
2022	Sivudu	Sivudu	Telugu	Acted only in Telugu version	
2023	Partner	Sridhar	Tamil		
2025	Sabdham	Ruben	Tamil		
2025	Akhanda 2: Thaandavam	Netra	Telugu		
2025	Drive	Jaidev Reddy	Telugu		
TBA	Maragadha Naanayam 2 †		Tamil	Filming	

=== Television ===
Year	Title	Role	Network	Language	Notes	ref
2022	Modern Love Hyderabad	Dr. Uday	Amazon Prime Video	Telugu	Segment: "Fuzzy, Purple, and Full of Thorns"	
2025	Mayasabha	Kakarla Krishnama Naidu	SonyLIV	Telugu		

== Discography ==
Year	Film	Song	Notes
2015	Yagavarayinum Naa Kaakka	Sokkana Ponna	
2015	Malupu	Chalaki Pilla	

== Awards and nominations ==
Film	Award	Ceremony	Category	Result	Ref.
Sarrainodu	Nandi Awards	2016	Best Villain	Won	
Ninnu Kori	7th South Indian International Movie Awards	2018	Best Supporting Actor (Telugu)	Won	
Ninnu Kori	Filmfare Awards South	2018	Best Supporting Actor – Telugu	Nominated	
Rangasthalam	Filmfare Awards South	2019	Best Supporting Actor – Telugu	Nominated	
Rangasthalam	South Indian International Movie Awards	2019	Best Supporting Actor (Telugu)	Nominated	
