= Team 5 =

- Film poster
- Directed by: Suresh Govind
- Written by: Suresh Govind
- Produced by: Raj Zacharias
- Starring: S. Sreesanth; Nikki Galrani
- Cinematography: Sajith Purushan
- Edited by: Dileep Dennis
- Music by: Gopi Sundar
- Production company: Celebs And Red Carpet
- Release date: 14 July 2017
- Running time: 100 minutes
- Country: India
- Language: Malayalam

Team 5 is a 2017 Indian Malayalam-language film directed by Suresh Govind. The film stars cricketer S. Sreesanth and Nikki Galrani in the lead roles. The film was dubbed in Tamil and Telugu.

== Plot ==
Akhil who is the back bone of his gang participates in racing tournaments all around the city along with his gang mates. Akhil's life takes a dramatic turn when he falls in love with an event manager Irene.

== Cast ==
- S. Sreesanth as Akhil
- Nikki Galrani as Nancy
- Sumesh Krishnan
- Pearle Maaney as Aleena
- Makarand Deshpande
- Anand Bhairav as Sachu

== Production ==
Former cricketer, S. Sreesanth, signed the film to play the lead role as a bike racer. The film was shot in Australia, Bangalore, and Goa. Sreesanth learned several bike stunts for his role in the film. Niiki Galrani was signed to portray the lead actress.

== Soundtrack ==
The songs are composed by Gopi Sundar.

== Reception ==
Reviewing the Tamil dubbed version, a critic from Maalai Malar wrote that the film could have entertained us.
