= Nikki Galrani =

Indian actress (born 1992)

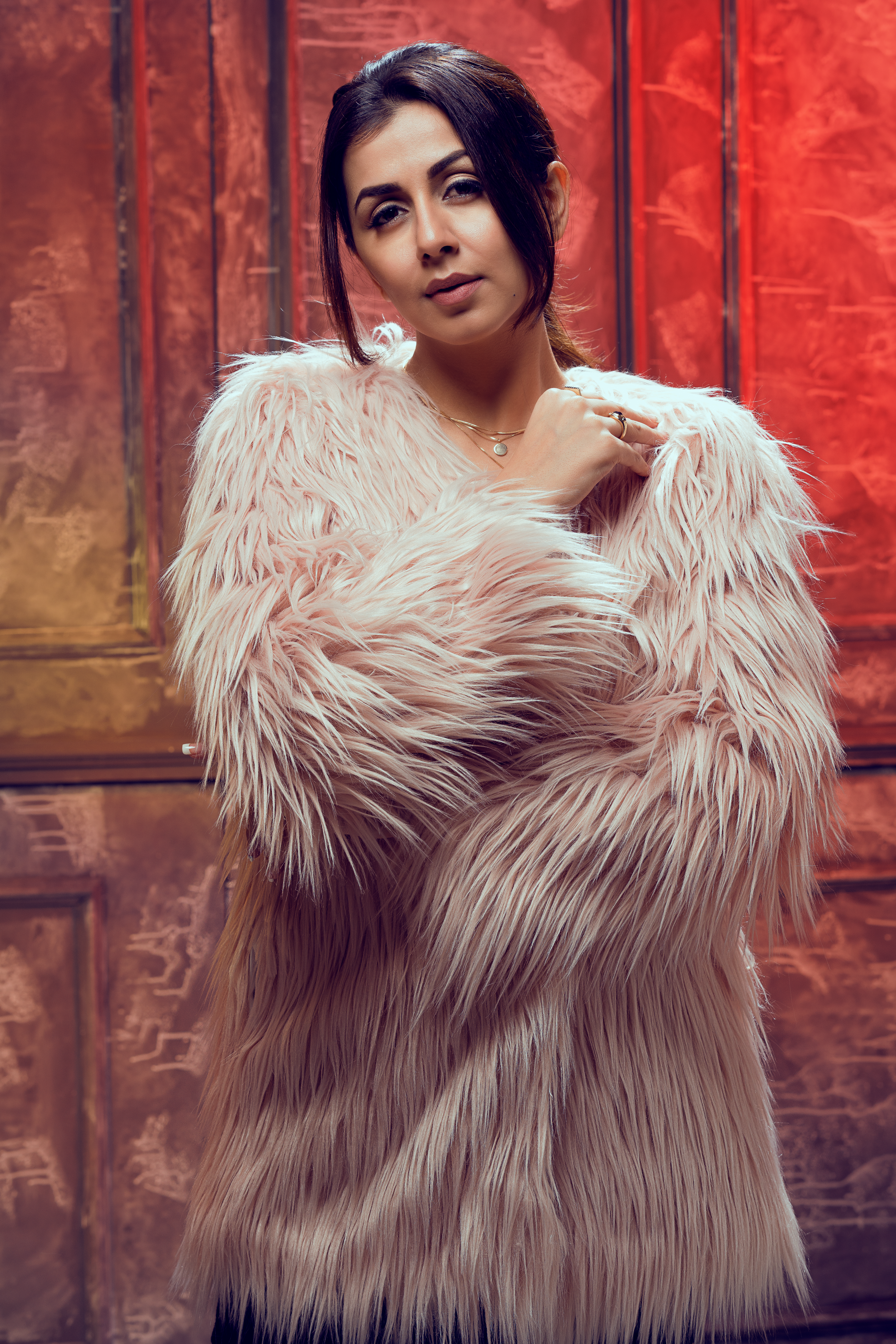
- Nikita in 2023
- Born: Nikita Galrani; 3 January 1992 (age 34); Bangalore, Karnataka, India
- Other name: Nikki Galrani Pinisetty
- Education: Bishop Cotton Women's Christian College
- Occupations: Actress; model
- Years active: 2014–present
- Spouse: Aadhi Pinisetty (m. 2022)
- Relatives: Sanjjanaa Galrani (sister)

Nikita Galrani Pinisetty (née Galrani; born 3 January 1992) is an Indian actress known for her works in Tamil and Malayalam films. Her commercially successful films include 1983 (2014), Vellimoonga (2014), Darling (2015) and Velainu Vandhutta Vellaikaaran (2016).

== Early life and education ==
Born as Nikita Galrani on 3 January 1992 in Bangalore, Karnataka, she is the younger daughter of Manohar and Reshma Galrani, who are of Sindhi ancestry. She has an elder sister, Sanjjanaa, who is also an actress.

Galrani was educated at the Bishop Cotton Girls' School, Bangalore. Thereafter she did her PUC at the Bishop Cotton Women's Christian College, Bangalore, and later took up a course in fashion designing. She said that she did her PUC in science because her parents and sister wanted her to become a doctor, but they later let her pursue designing. She then did modelling and appeared in many advertisements. She resides in Chennai.

== Career ==
=== Debut and breakthrough in Malayalam cinema (2014) ===
Galrani started her film career with the Malayalam-language sports drama film 1983 (2014), written and directed by Abrid Shine, starring Nivin Pauly. Galrani played the character Manjula Sasidharan, a village girl and teenage lover of Rameshan (Pauly), who loves cricket more than anything. The film was critical and commercial success. She won awards from Filmfare, SIIMA and Vanitha as the best debut actress that year. She signed her first film to play the lead role in Ajith, the Kannada remake of the Tamil film Paiyaa, after an audition. Within three days, she had signed her next project, her first Tamil film, Yagavarayinum Naa Kaakka and few weeks later, her first Malayalam film as well: 1983. In spite of being the last film she signed in 2013, 1983 released first in early 2014 and became her debut film and was her first major box office hit. She portrayed the role of Manjula Sasidharan, a rural village school girl and said that the character was exactly the opposite of what she was in real life and that she had to sunbathe to get dark for the role. The film received critical acclaim and became a box office success, while Galrani went on to win the Filmfare Award for Best Female Debut – South for her performance.

A week later, Galrani had her second release, Nivin Pauly and Nazriya's Ohm Shanthi Oshaana, in which she had performed a cameo role. She had a third Malayalam release in 2014, Vellimoonga, in which she played a nurse. The film, made on a budget of under ₹ 5 crores, went on to collect over ₹ 20 crores at the box office. At the end of the year, IBTimes called Galrani the most successful actress of 2014 in Malayalam cinema. Even before the release of her first Kannada film, she had been signed for three more Kannada projects as well: Jamboo Savari, a remake of the Telugu film Swamy Ra Ra, Obiraya and Paravashanadenu, although the latter two were shelved midway. Ajith and Jamboo Savari released in quick succession in the second quarter of 2014. She had signed up Sharath A Haridaasan's Enthoru Bhagyam and V. K. Prakash's next project, but had to opt out of both due to conflicting schedules.

=== Debut in Tamil and Telugu cinema (2015–2016) ===
The delay of Yagavarayinum Naa Kaakka meant that the horror comedy Darling that she began shooting for much later became her debut Tamil release. It was successfully completed over 365-day at the Kollywood Industry, and went on to become successful at the Indian box-office. Galrani portrayed a spirit possessed girl "that you will be rooting for", and her performance was well received by critics, who stated that she gave a "good performance" and had "played her part really well". Sify.com stated that "Nikki Galrani is cute and adorable, she is quite good at emotional sequences as well". Darling was followed by the releases of her two Malayalam films Ivan Maryadaraman and Oru Second Class Yathra. and the Kannada film Siddhartha that featured her in a pivotal role which she shot for in August 2014. In June 2015, Yagavarayinum Naa Kaakka was eventually released. Her character in the film, she said, was a "carbon copy of what I am in my real life". Sify.com stated that "Galrani's infectious smile and energy is a major plus in the first half".

Galrani starred opposite Suresh Gopi in the Malayalam film Rudra Simhasanam. Her next Tamil film, Ko 2 was commercially successful at the Tamil box-office. Both of her Telugu language debut films performed fairly at the Tollywood box office. Galrani starred in Velainu Vandhutta Vellaikaaran (2016) a Tamil film where she played a police officer opposite Vishnu Vishal. The film was financially successful. IndiaGlitz.com stated "Nikki added much more glamour to the film in songs and live entire the film by her stunt sequences". Galrani also made a cameo appearance in Shajahanum Pareekuttiyum. Her next Tamil film was opposite G. V. Prakash Kumar again, with Kadavul Irukaan Kumaru. Blasting News stated that "Nikki Galrani was spectacular, and the trio literally captured the soft part of audience's hearts".

=== 2017–present ===
In 2017, Galrani acted in Tamil film Motta Shiva Ketta Shiva opposite Raghava Lawrence followed by Maragadha Naanayam. She also acted in a Malayalam film Team 5 (2017) and successively four Tamil films Neruppu Da (2017), Hara Hara Mahadevaki (2017), Kalakalappu 2 (2018) and Pakka (2018). She also worked in Kannada entitled O Premave (2018). In 2019, she appeared in Tamil action films with Charlie Chaplin 2, Dev and Kee. In 2020, She made her comeback in Malayalam with the comedy Dhamaka.

== Personal life ==
On 24 March 2022, Galrani got engaged to her long-time boyfriend and actor Aadhi Pinisetty. The couple married on 18 May 2022.

== Filmography ==
Key
†	Denotes films that have not yet been released

List of the films acted by Nikki Galrani
Year	Title (Note: Films are listed in order of release date.)	Role(s)	Language	Notes	Ref(s).
2014	1983	Manjula Sasidharan	Malayalam	Debut; Filmfare Award for Best Female Debut – South	
2014	Ohm Shanthi Oshaana	Thennal K. Warrier	Malayalam	Guest appearance	
2014	Ajith	Charulatha (Charu)	Kannada		
2014	Jamboo Savari	Purvi	Kannada		
2014	Vellimoonga	Lisa Wareed	Malayalam		
2015	Darling	Nisha	Tamil		
2015	Siddhartha	Anju	Kannada	Special appearance	
2015	Ivan Maryadaraman	Krishnendu (Krishna)	Malayalam		
2015	Oru Second Class Yathra	Lakshmi	Malayalam		
2015	Yagavarayinum Naa Kaakka	Kayal	Tamil		
2015	Rudra Simhasanam	Haimavathi / Mrinalini	Malayalam		
2015	Rajamma @ Yahoo	Sherin	Malayalam		
2016	Malupu	Kayal	Telugu		
2016	Krishnashtami	Pallavi	Telugu		
2016	Ko 2	Priyadarshini	Tamil		
2016	Velainu Vandhutta Vellaikaaran	Archana	Tamil		
2016	Shajahanum Pareekuttiyum	Thresiamma Punnose	Malayalam	Cameo appearance	
2016	Kadavul Irukaan Kumaru	Priya	Tamil		
2017	Motta Shiva Ketta Shiva	Jaanu	Tamil		
2017	Maragadha Naanayam	Chanakya	Tamil		
2017	Team 5	Nancy	Malayalam		
2017	Neruppu Da	Vasumathi	Tamil		
2017	Hara Hara Mahadevaki	Ramya	Tamil		
2018	Kalakalappu 2	Aishwarya	Tamil		
2018	Pakka	'Rajini' Radha	Tamil		
2018	O Premave	Anjali	Kannada		
2019	Charlie Chaplin 2	Sara	Tamil		
2019	Dev	Krithika	Tamil	Cameo appearance	
2019	Kee	Diya	Tamil		
2020	Dhamaka	Annie / Ann Mary	Malayalam		
2021	Raajavamsam	Gayathri	Tamil		
2022	Idiot	Smitha	Tamil		
2022	Sivudu	Vennela	Telugu	Only acted in the Telugu version	
2024	Virunnu	Perly	Malayalam		
TBA	Maragadha Naanayam 2 †		Tamil		

== Television ==
Year	Title	Role	Language	Notes	Channel	Ref.
2022	Comedy Stars-S3	Special Judge	Malayalam	Reality show	Asianet TV	
2022	Vellum Thiramai	Judge	Tamil	Reality show	Colors Tamil	
2024	Jodi are you ready	Judge	Tamil	Reality show	Star Vijay	

== Awards and nominations ==
Nikki Galrani awards and nominations
Awards and nominations
Award	Wins	Nominations

Totals (Note: Certain award groups do not simply award one winner. They acknowledge several different recipients, have runners-up, and have third place. Since this is a specific recognition and is different from losing an award, runner-up mentions are considered wins in this award tally. For simplification and to avoid errors, each award in this list has been presumed to have had a prior nomination.)
- Wins: 6
- Nominations: 0

Year (Note: Refers to the year in which the ceremony was held.)	Award	Category	Film	Result	Ref.
2015	17th Asianet Film Awards	Best New Face of the Year – Female	1983	Won	
2015	Vanitha Film Awards	Best Newcomer Actress	1983	Won	
2015	62nd Filmfare Awards South	Best Female Debut – Malayalam	1983	Won	
2015	4th South Indian International Movie Awards	Best Debut Actress – Malayalam	1983	Won	
2015	Kerala Film Critics Association Awards	Best Newcomer Actress	1983	Won	
2016	Edison Awards	Best Debut Actress	Darling	Won	
