= O Premave (2018 film) =

#O Premave
- Directed by: Manoj Kumar
- Produced by: C. T. Chanchala Kumari
- Starring: Manoj Kumar; Nikki Galrani
- Music by: Anand Rajavikram; Rahul Dev
- Production company: M K Films
- Release date: 16 March 2018
- Running time: 121 minutes
- Country: India
- Language: Kannada

#O Premave is a 2018 Indian Kannada-language romantic drama film directed by Manoj Kumar and starring himself and Nikki Galrani.

== Cast ==
- Manoj Kumar as Rahul
- Nikki Galrani as Anjali
- Apoorva
- Rangayana Raghu
- Sadhu Kokila
- Prashanth Siddi
- Huccha Venkat in a cameo appearance

== Production ==
The film is directed by Manoj Kumar, who starred in Moggina Manasu. The film is based on a true story. The film was shot in Bengaluru, Mangalore, Mysore, and the song "Gari Gedari" was shot in Switzerland. Nikki Galrani, who was last seen in Kanna with the film Sidhartha, portrays the lead actress. Femina Miss India 2016 South finalist Apoorva Rai was signed to play a role in the film.

== Soundtrack ==
The songs were composed by Anand Rajavikram and Rahul Dev.

All lyrics are written by Chandan Raj, Jayanth Kaikini, Kaviraj, and Chethan Kumar.

No.	Title	Singer(s)	Length
1.	"Husi Nage"	Anjana Selvakumar, Rahul Dev	4:38
2.	"Gari Gedari"	Sonu Nigam, Shreya Ghoshal	4:52
3.	"Nee Baradiru"	Vijay Prakash	3:56
4.	"Anuraaga"	Rithisha Padmanabh	2:26
5.	"Sa Ri Ga Ma Pa"	Tippu	4:44
6.	"Booze Maad De Iro"	Vijay Prakash, Shilpa	3:57
Total length:			24:33

== Reception ==
The Times of India gave the film two out of five stars and wrote that "This film can be a choice for those who want an old-fashioned love story, with the hero being the one who uploads all things idealistic". The News Minute wrote that "At the end of the day, if you’re looking for a well-crafted romance with relatable characters, #O Premave is not it".
