= Aarathu Sinam =

2016 Indian film by Arivazhagan

- Theatrical release poster
- Directed by: Arivazhagan
- Screenplay by: Arivazhagan
- Based on: Memories by Jeethu Joseph
- Produced by: N. Ramasamy
- Starring: Arulnithi; Aishwarya Rajesh; Aishwarya Dutta
- Cinematography: Aravinnd Singh
- Edited by: S. Rajesh Kannan
- Music by: S. Thaman
- Production company: Sri Thenandal Films
- Release date: 26 February 2016
- Running time: 137 minutes
- Country: India
- Language: Tamil

Aarathu Sinam (transl. Anger won't subside) is a 2016 Indian Tamil-language crime thriller film written and directed by Arivazhagan and produced by Sri Thenandal Films. A remake of Jeethu Joseph's Malayalam film Memories (2013), the film stars Arulnithi, Aishwarya Rajesh and Aishwarya Dutta. It was released on 26 February 2016 to positive reviews from critics but was an average grosser.

== Plot ==
ACP Aravind was a daredevil police officer who is now off duty due to his drinking habits, which he engaged in after his wife Miya and child Meenu were murdered by criminals who wanted revenge. Aravind's supervisor requests him to proceed with a parallel investigation in a case involving the disappearance and possible kidnapping of several young married men, since the present police team is not able to make any progress in the case. Aravind refuses to this, but later, his mother requests him to. Aravind soon gets into the case files and consults the postmortem documents and the doctors who conducted it.

Soon, Aravind is seen making a breakthrough in the case. Another two kidnappings happen in the series, and all this leads to Aravind's rough conclusion of the murderer. The murderer is an eccentric person, has a limp in his feet, and either hates or loves women. The killer leaves certain clues inscribed by sharp surgical knives on the victims' chests. This serves Aravind's thinking of what kind of person the killer is and who his next target is. Upon careful examination of the words inscribed in the victims' bodies, Aravind uncovers that the words are actually Aramaic, the language that Jesus used for communication. The words are later found to point to biblical proverbs, thus helping Aravind lead to conclusions that the killer is insane and that he assumed the victims gave up their lives for the sins committed by their respective wives. He soon figures out that the wives of the kidnapped husbands have links and they all had to do with a guy who studied with them certain years back. There was absolutely no evidence of such a person.

During all these scenes, Aravind realises that there is one last target, and the killer will not miss this, and he will disappear after that. He eventually finds out that the next target is his own brother, and his brother's wife is the last link in the connection. Aravind, with the help of his colleague and other evidences, finds out that the killer has a property. The film ends with Aravind using his presence of mind, apprehending the murderer and saving his brother's life. The story of this movie is adapted from Blake Pierce's novel Before He Kills.

== Cast ==
- Arulnithi as ACP Aravind IPS
- Aishwarya Rajesh as Miya, Aravind's wife
- Aishwarya Dutta as Varsha, Sub-Editor of Dinakaran
- Tulasi as Aravind's mother
- Chavi Sharma as Meenu, Aravind's daughter
- Gaurav Narayanan as Santhosh/Peter
- Radha Ravi as Joint Commissioner of Police
- Anupama Kumar as Saradha, Santhosh's sister
- R. N. R. Manohar as Minister
- Robo Shankar as Assistant Commissioner Sarguna Pandian
- Charle as Arokiya Raj
- Ramesh Thilak as Taxi Driver
- Bose Venkat as Correspondent Viswanathan, Santhosh's brother-in-law
- Aadhira Pandilakshmi as Valliammai
- Hema Rajkumar as Vimala
- Vineetha as Mrs. Mayilvahanan
- Durga Deepthi as Mrs. Rahul
- Ashritha Sreedas as Sheela Rajesh
- Dheeraj Vishnu Rathnam as Sekar
- Sheela Rajkumar as Malar
- George Maryan as Watchman
- Mippu as Mechanic

== Production ==
A Tamil remake of the Malayalam film Memories (2013) was announced in August 2015. The makers planned to begin production in October the same year and wrap by December. In October, after the start of production, the title of the initially untitled remake was later revealed as Aarathu Sinam. Filming wrapped in mid-January 2016, within 40 working days. Ahead of the film's release, Arulnithi noted the challenges he faced in portraying an alcoholic police officer: "I had to act sloshed but be wary of what I was going through and express it clearly", and sought to portray the lead role in his own preferred manner to avoid comparisons with Prithviraj Sukumaran, who played the same role in Memories.

== Soundtrack ==
Aarathu Sinam

Soundtrack album by S. Thaman
- Released: 2016
- Genre: Feature film soundtrack
- Language: Tamil
- Label: Divo

S. Thaman chronology
Chakravyuha (2016)	Aarathu Sinam (2016)	Zoom (2016)

The soundtrack features one song composed by S. Thaman with lyrics by Viveka.

No.	Title	Lyrics	Singer(s)	Length
1.	"Thanimaiye"	Viveka	Vijay Yesudas	5:01

== Release ==
Aarathu Sinam was released on 26 February 2016. The film had its television premiere on KTV during Ayudha Puja in October 2016.

== Reception ==
S Saraswathi of Rediff.com wrote, "Director Arivazhagan's Aarathu Sinam is a decent crime thriller with plenty of exciting moments that make it worth a watch." Sify wrote, "Remaking a Malayalam classic is definitely an arduous task. Memories is one of the finest crime thrillers made in Malayalam cinema and to be honest, Arivazhagan has successfully pulled it off to a very large extent. Overall, Aarathu Sinam is a decent investigation thriller, especially for audiences who haven't seen the original". Baradwaj Rangan wrote for The Hindu, "Maybe something got lost in the translation, but there's no mood, no atmosphere, no white-knuckle tension in Aarathu Sinam. There's just plot. And big swatches of explanatory dialogue – people keep talking as though a switch went on, and they just won't stop. It isn't even conversation. It's just information."
