= Neruppu Da =

2017 Indian film by B. Ashok Kumar

- Theatrical release poster
- Directed by: B. Ashok Kumar
- Written by: B. Ashok Kumar
- Produced by: Vikram Prabhu; Esakki Durai; R. K. Ajaykumar
- Starring: Vikram Prabhu; Nikki Galrani
- Cinematography: R. D. Rajasekhar
- Edited by: Thiyagu
- Music by: Sean Roldan
- Production companies: First Artist; Chandra Arts
- Distributed by: Cine Innovations
- Release date: 8 September 2017
- Country: India
- Language: Tamil

Neruppu Da (transl. Fire 'Em Up) is a 2017 Indian Tamil-language action thriller film written and directed by debutant B. Ashok Kumar. The film was produced by Vikram Prabhu under his First Artist production company and stars him in the lead role alongside Nikki Galrani alongside an ensemble supporting cast including Sangeetha, Madhusudhan Rao, Vincent Asokan, Varun, and Rajkumar. The music was composed by Sean Roldan with cinematography by R. D. Rajasekhar and editing by debutant Thiyagu. The film's production started in July 2016, and the film was released on 8 September 2017.

== Plot ==
Guru, Dhana, Parthi, Dass, and Samba are five childhood friends. Their main aim is to join the fire service and save lives. Until they get their jobs, they go around putting out fires and saving lives on their own. Their actions are praised by everyone, including the zonal fire officer, Narayanamoorthy, who promises them that they will secure their jobs if they pass the exam required to join the fire service.

The night before the exam, an injured Dhana meets his friends. He tells them that while returning home after visiting his sister, he was stopped by a man named Sadha and his friend Soori. Sadha repeatedly assaults Dhana and tells Soori that he is a don and is unstoppable. When Sadha slaps Dhana, Dhana pushes him away and escapes. The five friends later visit the place where the incident happened to teach Sadha a lesson. To their shock, they see Sadha dead. It is revealed that when Dhana pushed Sadha, Sadha fell, hit a rock, and succumbed to his injury. It is also revealed that he was the right-hand man of "Puliyanthoppu" Ravi, the city's most feared don.

The five friends seek help from MLA Kabali, the area counsellor and a well-wisher of Guru. Kabali tells them that Ravi will definitely come to avenge Sadha's death and that he cannot help the friends because Ravi is too powerful for him. Guru suggests that the friends finish off Ravi before he finds them, so the friends decide to kidnap him. The friends later visit Sadha's burial place, where all the dons from Chennai have assembled. Guru tells his friends that once Ravi goes away, they will kidnap him. At the site, Ravi asks Soori, who was drinking when the incident happened, who killed Sadha, only for Soori to not remember anything as he was drunk. Ravi then kills Soori in a fit of rage, and Guru is relieved since the only evidence against the friends is the dead Soori. However, Guru then gets a call from Samba and Parthi, who were hiding elsewhere. They tell him that they have kidnapped Ravi. Guru is upset and explains to his friends what happened, telling them that they are back in trouble.

As they discuss what to do next, Ravi manages to escape. He comes face-to-face with the five friends and asks them for help. Apparently, he does not know who kidnapped him as he met with an accident and became unconscious, so the friends release him. However, Ravi is keen on finding the man who kidnapped him and killed Sadha. Since he was kidnapped and hidden in the area of the friends, he inquires there and catches Kabali, who tells him everything. Ravi tracks down the five friends. Guru later engages in a fight with Ravi and his henchmen, defeating the henchmen but deciding to spare Ravi. Guru tells Ravi that Sadha's death was an accident, but Ravi still has vengeance and threatens to kill Guru's loved ones.

Some days later, Guru's father Manikkam is killed. Guru suspects Ravi and decides to take revenge. However, upon reaching Ravi's place, he finds him and his henchmen dead. Commissioner Ramkumar reveals to Guru that Ravi was killed before Manikkam. Suddenly, Guru gets a call saying that his friends and girlfriend Vasumathi (Narayanamoorthy's daughter) have been kidnapped, and he must come to a location if he wants to see them alive. There, it is revealed that the person behind the murders is Annam, Sadha's transgender wife who has been trying to avenge his death. She approaches Ravi, but he refuses to help her, saying that Sadha's death was an accident and he will not kill Guru or his friends for this. This angers Annam, who kills Ravi, his henchmen, and then Manikkam.

Annam tells Guru that Sadha had loved her despite her being a transgender and, thinking that Guru shattered her life, decides to kill Vasumathi. However, Dhana escapes and manages to push Annam into a burning pyre. Guru saves Vasumathi, his friends, and Annam, stating that even if someone is an enemy, he will never let them be killed by fire. He also apologises to Annam, saying that Sadha's death was an accident. Annam gets moved by his gesture and forgives him. Guru then leaves the place with his friends and girlfriend.

Later, the five friends take the exam, pass it, join the fire service, and rush to a spot to save some people.

== Cast ==
- Vikram Prabhu as Guru
- Nikki Galrani as Vasumathi
- Sangeetha as Annam
- Madhusudhan Rao as "Puliyanthoppu" Ravi
- Vincent Asokan as Sadhasivam
- Aadukalam Naren as Commissioner Ramkumar
- Ponvannan as Manikkam
- Rajendran as MLA Kabali
- Nagineedu as Narayanamoorthy
- Varun as Dhana
- Rajkumar as Parthi
- Dinesh Karna as Dass
- Vincent as Samba
- Arumugam Kutty Ambani as Kootathil Oruvan
- Arumugam O. P. as Guru's friend
- Rajasimman as Sivam
- R. S. Shivaji as Ravi's friend
- Ramachandran Durairaj as Soori

== Production ==
The title of the film was taken from the popular song from Rajinikanth's Kabali (2016), with the team feeling that Vikram Prabhu's character as a firefighter and a Rajinikanth fan meant that the title would be apt. The film began production on 11 July 2016 at Old Mahabalipuram Road. Shooting also took place at EVP Film City for five days. The film deals with the complete life of fire brigades.

== Soundtrack ==
Neruppu Da

Soundtrack album by Sean Roldan
- Released: 2017
- Genre: Feature film soundtrack
- Length: 15:41
- Language: Tamil
- Label: Think Music India
- Producer: Sean Roldan

Sean Roldan chronology
Katha Nayagan (2017)	Neruppu Da (2017)	Velaiilla Pattadhari 2 (2017)

The soundtrack was composed by Sean Roldan.

Track listing
No.	Title	Lyrics	Singers	Length
1.	"Aalangiliyae"	Yugabharathi	Sean Roldan, Shweta Mohan	3:24
2.	"Karukku Kallangolu"	Rokesh	Anirudh Ravichander	3:28
3.	"Andha Madhiri Ponna"	Rokesh	Ravi G	3:52
4.	"Enga Pona"	Sean Roldan	Sean Roldan	2:47
5.	"Iruda Poruda"		Blaaze	2:10
Total length:				15:41

== Reception ==
M Suganth of The Times of India gave 3/5 stars and wrote, "Neruppuda, at first, feels like a tried-and-tested action film — a group of youngsters versus a powerful gangster. But Ashok Kumar keeps subverting the masala movie cliches that he throws at us." Udhav Naig of The Hindu wrote, "Things do get interesting after the film re-establishes itself late into the second half as an actual ‘whodunit’. But the big reveal feels contrived much like the film itself." Baradwaj Rangan of Film Companion wrote, "I don't want to oversell Neruppu Da, which is little more than a modest entertainer (And maybe it doesn't want to be anything more). Some more skill in the making would have helped — but the sheer unpredictability keeps you watching." Gopinath Rajendran of The New Indian Express wrote, "While Neruppu Da isn’t Vikram Prabhu’s best till date, there is little doubt that it is sure to, if you’ll pardon me for the expression, engulf his recent bad films like forest fire."
