= Eeram =

2009 Indian horror-thriller film

- Theatrical release poster
- Directed by: Arivazhagan
- Written by: Arivazhagan
- Produced by: S. Shankar
- Starring: Aadhi; Nandaa; Sindhu Menon
- Cinematography: Manoj Paramahamsa
- Edited by: Kishore Te
- Music by: S. Thaman
- Production company: S Pictures
- Release date: 11 September 2009
- Running time: 164 minutes
- Country: India
- Language: Tamil

Eeram (transl. Moisture) is a 2009 Indian Tamil-language horror thriller film written and directed by Arivazhagan in his directorial debut and produced by S. Shankar. The film stars Aadhi, Nandaa and Sindhu Menon. Saranya Mohan, Srinath, Lakshmi Ramakrishnan, and Krishna play supporting roles. The music was composed by S. Thaman in his debut Tamil film with cinematography by Manoj Paramahamsa and editing by Kishore Te.

Eeram was mostly shot in Chennai, Srirangam, Tiruchirappalli and Pondicherry. The film was released on 11 September 2009 and became a commercial success. The film received critical acclaim for its theme, narrative, cast performance, cinematography, musical score, and direction. Over the years it has attained cult status. The Telugu dubbed version of the film titled Vaishali was released on 27 May 2011, and was commercially successful as well.

== Plot ==
The plot opens with water overflowing from an apartment at around 2:00 AM in Block E, which is seen by the apartment watchman. When he goes to inspect the source of the water, he witnesses a woman Ramya in the bathtub dead from asphyxiation. An investigation of her death is done by Assistant Commissioner of Police Vasudevan, an honest and upright police officer who is also Ramya's former boyfriend. Although circumstantial evidence points it was a suicide, Vasu doubts its reliability and restarts the investigation of the events leading to her death.

The investigation reveals that Ramya was having an extramarital affair with an unknown person, and his frequent visits to her flat are confirmed by her neighbours in the building. However, Vasu is not convinced and sure that there is someone behind Ramya's death and names him Mr. X. He also remembers his love life with Ramya during their college years. Vasu was refused Ramya's hand in marriage by her father Srinivasan as he was not willing to get his daughter married to a police officer. When Vasu asked her to elope and marry him, she refused, and they amicably parted ways. Later, Ramya married a wealthy businessman Balakrishnan Egambaram.

Meanwhile, strange mishaps begin to take place in the apartment where Ramya died. Kalyani Subramaniyam, who resides in the flat opposite Ramya's, dies by electric shock. An army veteran, Thiyagarajan, on his visit to Pondicherry, dies when an umbrella tip pierces his neck. The apartment watchman also dies a mysterious death. Vasu connects these deaths to Ramya but does not know how exactly. He finds that water is the common element in all the deaths. He appoints a few assistants to live in various flats of the apartment and inform him if there is any suspicious activity. The assistants point out a young man coming there to meet his girlfriend Deepa. Vasu identifies him as Mr. X and follows him to a theatre, but before he can catch him, he sees Mr. X banging his head into the restroom mirror. Vasu tries to stop him from killing himself, but an eerie spirit stops him from saving the young man. Vasu then sees human footprints walking on water and understands that it is the work of a supernatural entity.

The colour red and water keep appearing together as signals to Vasu that a murder is about to take place. He is unable to convince his superiors that the deaths are not accidental. Vasu investigates from a supernatural standpoint of life after death, and finds that a spirit can contact this world in any medium after the death and that it may also be through water. Vasu realises that Ramya's spirit killed everyone. One night, when Ramya's sister Divya visits Vasu in his house to console him over Ramya's death, the latter's spirit possesses her and reveals the truth of her life after her break-up from Vasu. Ramya lived happily with Bala but only for a short time. Bala disliked anything secondhand in his life. He could not digest his wife's past relation with Vasu and started to harass her. Ramya's maid complained of Thiyagarajan in another flat as he had been sexually harassing her. Ramya warned Thiyagarajan that if he repeated this, she would inform his wife. Ramya also advised Deepa to stop having a boyfriend (Mr. X) as it would ruin her life, and this earned her Deepa's dislike. Ramya's neighbour Kalyani wanted the flat where Ramya lived, for her daughter. Mr. X created an impression that he had come to visit Ramya to Kalyani. Kalyani then had spun a false story of an affair between Ramya and Mr. X against Ramya between the neighbours, and Thiyagarajan also confirmed it to Bala as revenge for her earlier threat. Therefore, Bala killed Ramya believing she had a "supposed" affair with Mr. X and drowned her in the water and staged it to make it look like a suicide.

Hence, Ramya's soul killed Kalyani by electric shock; Thiyagarajan by the umbrella tip; the watchman who supported the false statement against Ramya; Mr. X by bashing him against the mirror; and continues to traumatise Deepa, which leaves the girl mentally unstable, yet she survives. Vasu informs Bala that he will soon avenge Ramya's death by bringing the truth of her murder by Bala to light. Bala's friend Vignesh misguides him right from the beginning about the women's promiscuity. Vicky later gets killed by Bala himself as he threatened to reveal the truth. Bala is confident that he can be caught only if he confesses to the crime. One night, Bala kidnaps Divya and holds her captive in a car showroom. Vasu comes to save her and gets into a face-to-face combat with Bala. In the fight, Bala initially gains the upper hand, hits Vasu mercilessly with an iron rod on his head, and then stabs Vasu in his stomach with his own machete. Vasu then loses consciousness, but Ramya's spirit possesses him and gives him the upper hand to knock out Bala. Vasu succeeds in saving Divya, and then Ramya's spirit leaves him.

The following day, Bala suddenly confesses to his wife's murder, giving Vasu a reason to arrest him. In reality, Ramya's spirit had possessed Bala and made him confess the truth. After the press conference, while Bala is being taken to court, the sky's colour changes. It begins to rain, and petrol is shown to be leaking from the police jeep in which Bala is seated. Vasu sees a red umbrella with water dripping from it. The screen fades to black and the sound of a jeep crashing can be heard, implying that Bala was killed.

== Cast ==
- Aadhi as ACP Vasudevan IPS (Vasu)
- Nandha as Balakrishnan Egambaram (Bala)
- Sindhu Menon as Ramya alias Vaishali Srinivasan (Settled Real Name) Vaishali Balakrishnan
- Saranya Mohan as Divya Srinivasan
- Srinath as Vignesh (Vicky), Bala's friend
- Krishna as Mr. X
- Lakshmi Ramakrishnan as Kalyani Ramakrishnan
- Boys Rajan as Professor Thiyagarajan
- V. N. Chidambaram as Egambaram, Balakrishnan's father
- Rajasekar as Srinivasan, Ramya/Vaishali and Divya's father
- Prabhakar as Venkadachalam, Apartment Owner
- Ram Rajendran as Vasu's collegemate
- Heera Selvaraj as Deepa

== Production ==
Eeram marked the directorial debut of Arivazhagan who was Shankar's associate director. Shankar himself produced the film.

== Soundtrack ==
Eeram

Soundtrack album by S. Thaman
- Released: 9 August 2009 (Tamil); 2011 (Telugu)
- Genre: Feature film soundtrack
- Length: 12:42 (Tamil); 12:29 (Telugu)
- Labels: Sony Music India; Think Music (Tamil); Aditya Music (Telugu)
- Producer: S. Thaman

S. Thaman chronology
Eeram (2009)	Sankham (2009)

The music was composed by debutant S. Thaman. The audio rights were bought by Think Music and Sony Music India. The songs were released on 9 August 2009. All lyrics were penned by Viveka.

The Telugu-dubbed soundtrack was released in 2011 by Aditya Music.

Tamil Track list
No.	Title	Singer(s)	Length
1.	"Mazhaiye Mazhaiye"	Ranjith	4:09
2.	"Tharai Erangiya"	Suchitra	3:42
3.	"Saaral En"	Ranjith	2:12
4.	"Theme of Eeram"	Instrumental	2:39
Total length:			12:42

Telugu Track list
No.	Title	Singer(s)	Length
1.	"Kurisey Kurisey"	Ranjith	4:07
2.	"Kurivippina"	Suchitra	3:38
3.	"Jalley"	Ranjith	2:12
4.	"Vaishali – Theme Music"	Instrumental	2:37
Total length:			12:29

== Reception ==
=== Critical response ===
Rediff.com wrote "Debutant director Arivazhagan, who has written and directed the film, has turned out a horror/suspense film that strives to score points on logic, novelty and raciness. The best part is that he actually makes you cling to the edge of the seat most of the time. No mean feat, considering the limitations on mainstream Tamil cinema". The Hindu wrote "Arivazhagan must have polished his screenplay over and over again to come up with such a lucid narrative that strongly impacts the viewer. Only wish the attempt doesn't prove to be a flash in the pan. Because Eeram shows that this young director is worth looking out for". Sify wrote, "Eeram is cool and chilling, but would have been better if it was trimmed by at least 15 minutes. Anyway Shankar can be proud of his new discovery- Arivazhagan, the film is worth a look".

=== Box office ===
The film released in 120 screens worldwide and was considered a sleeper hit by trade analysts.

== Dropped sequel ==
After the success of Eeram, Arivazhagan wanted to make a sequel as he had the story ready for it, but soon dropped the idea to avoid getting typecast. Later, he chose to go with a different genre which was not related to Eeram, as he did not want to limit himself to only horror films.

== See also ==
- List of ghost films
- List of horror films of 2009
