= Arivazhagan =

Indian film director

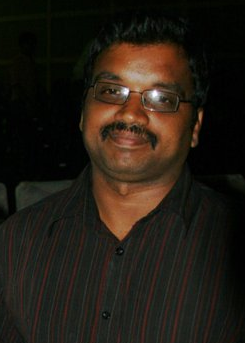
- Arivazhagan in 2022
- Born: Mettur, Tamil Nadu, India
- Occupations: Director, screenwriter
- Known for: Eeram, Vallinam, Aarathu Sinam, Kuttram 23, Tamil Rockerz, Sabdham
- Spouse: Heera Selvaraj

Arivazhagan is an Indian film director in Tamil cinema known for his 2009 thriller film Eeram.

== Career ==
Arivazhagan is a gold medalist from the M.G.R. Government Film and Television Training Institute. He went on to assist Shankar.

In 2009, he made his directorial debut with Eeram, which was produced by Shankar's production house, S Pictures. The film, with an unusual theme and plot, went on to become a huge hit. Arivazhagan's second film was Vallinam, which was produced by V. Ravichandran. The film was a very bold attempt, as sports dramas were made less frequently in Tamil cinema. Like Eeram, it too went on to become a sleeper hit at the box-office.

His third directorial, Kuttram 23, was received fairly lesser than his first two films, however, the theme and Arun Vijay's performance were highly praised. It was a profitable venture. He then remade Memories in Tamil as Aarathu Sinam, with Arulnithi. It was fairly successful at the box-office. He reunited with Arun Vijay, again, for the web series, Tamil Rockerz.

Arivazhagan began scripting Borrder starring Arun Vijay, Regina Cassandra and Stefy Patel in 2018, with the film initially developing under the title of Zindabad. Production was completed in 2021, following delays caused by the COVID-19 lockdown. Despite having scheduled release dates in November 2021, October 2022 and February 2023, the film has repeatedly been postponed owing to financial issues faced by the production studio, All In Pictures.

== Filmography ==
Year	Title	Notes	Ref
2009	Eeram		
2014	Vallinam		
2016	Aarathu Sinam	Remake of Memories	
2017	Kuttram 23		
2022	Tamil Rockerz	Web series on SonyLIV	
2025	Sabdham		
TBA	Borrder †	Delayed	
