= Ettuthikkum Para =

2020 Indian Tamil-language film

- Theatrical release poster
- Directed by: Keera
- Written by: Keera
- Produced by: P. Favince Paul; Vijaya Ramachandran
- Starring: Samuthirakani; Nitish Veera; Ramdoss; Shaju Mon; Chandini Tamilarasan
- Cinematography: Sipin Shivan
- Edited by: V. J. Sabu Joseph
- Music by: M. S. Sreekanth
- Production company: Varnalaya Cine Creations
- Release date: 6 March 2020
- Running time: 120 minutes
- Country: India
- Language: Tamil

Ettuthikkum Para (transl. Soar high) is a 2020 Tamil language drama film directed by Keera. The film stars Samuthirakani, Nitish Veera, Munishkanth, Shaju Mon and Chandini Tamilarasan.

== Synopsis ==
Ambedkar (Samuthirakani), a social activist, gets involved in the dark side of the government. As a result, his son and friends are killed. A lower caste individual (Nitish Veera) desires to marry a girl from a higher caste. Divyasree Kumaravel (Chandini Tamilarasan) leaves for Chennai to marry the man of her choice (Shaju Mon). Two senior citizens await the day of their death. Pattakkathi (Ramdoss), who works as a clown, is in need of Rs 20,000 to save his son's life. How these five separate stories interact forms the rest of the story.

== Cast ==
- Samuthirakani as Ambedkar
- Munishkanth as Pattakkathi
- Nitish Veera
- Shaju Mon
- Chandini Tamilarasan as Divyasree Kumaravel
- Savanthika
- Samiksha as Ambedkar's wife
- Junior MGR (guest appearance)
- Sampath Ram as Police Inspector
- Vazhakku En Muthuraman as Politician
- Supergood Subramani
- Kambam Meena
- Winner Ramachandran

== Production ==
The film is directed by Keera, who previously directed Pachai Engira Kaathu (2012) and Merlin (2018) and is about honour killings. The film began production in 2018 under the name Para before the makers decided to change the name to Ettuthikkum Para as the name para was similar to a caste name. Despite playing the lead role, Samuthirakani had few dialogues. The film takes place in the course of twelve hours and is revolves around a group of different kind of people that are united by chance. The film was shot in North Chennai and Nagercoil. The film highlights the negative aspects of honour killings based on caste.

== Soundtrack ==
The songs were composed by M. S. Sreekanth.

Song title	Lyricist	Singers	Length
"Para Para"	Saavee	Mukesh	3:15
"Ushrukkul Un Pera"	Snehan	Anuradha Sriram, Keshav Vinod	4:28
"Vaadi Chellam"	Uma Devi	Ananthu, Suganthi	4:55
Total length:			12:38

== Release ==
The film was released in March 2020.

Dinamalar gave the film a rating of one out of five. A critic from Maalai Malar praised the story, the acting of the cast, the music, and the cinematography.
