= Ayraa =

Indian actress

- Born: 18 August 1996 (age 29)
- Other name: Aayira
- Occupations: Actress, model
- Years active: 2014–present

Ayraa is an Indian actress who has appeared in predominantly Tamil films apart from a few Telugu films. She has starred in Sagaa (2019) and C/O Kaadhal (2021).

== Career ==
Ayraa appeared in over three hundred advertisement shoots as a child. Under the stagename of Ayraa, made her acting debut in Atlee's Theri (2016), portraying the sister of the character played by Samantha.

Ayraa subsequently went on to play lead roles in films including Sagaa (2019), which became notable for the song "Yaayum", and Nungambakkam (2020), a retelling of the Swathi murder case. She worked with actor R. S. Karthik on an unreleased film titled Siren in 2018, before collaborating again with him for the comedy Yennanga Sir Unga Sattam (2021).

== Filmography ==
Films

- Note: all films are in Tamil, unless otherwise noted.

Year	Film	Role	Notes
2016	Theri	Pallavi	
2019	Sagaa	Aarohi	
2020	Galtha	Isaiarasi	
2020	Nungambakkam	Sumathi	
2021	Kutty Story	Shruthi	
2021	C/O Kaadhal	Bhargavi	
2021	Yennanga Sir Unga Sattam		
2023	Boo	Aruna	Simultaneously shot in Telugu
2023	Thalainagaram 2	Parveen	
2023	En 6 Vaathiyaar Kaalpanthatta Kuzhu		
2023	Atharva	Joshni	Telugu film
2026	Satan – The Dark	Alisha	
2026	I, Nobody		

Television

Year	Film	Role	Language	Notes
2020	PubGoa		Tamil	
