= Nungambakkam (film) =

2020 film directed by Ramesh Selvan

- Film poster
- Directed by: S. D. Ramesh Selvan
- Produced by: K. C. Ravidhevan
- Starring: Ajmal; Mano; Ayra
- Cinematography: Jones Anand
- Edited by: A. Marish
- Music by: Sam D. Raj
- Production company: Dream World Cinemas
- Distributed by: CiniFlix
- Release date: 30 October 2020
- Running time: 95 minutes
- Country: India
- Language: Tamil

Nungambakkam is a 2020 Indian Tamil-language crime drama film directed by S. D. Ramesh Selvan and produced by K. C. Ravidhevan. Based on the Swathi murder case, the film stars Ajmal, Mano, and Ayra, while A. Venkatesh, G. Gnanasambandam, and R. N. R. Manohar play supporting roles. The film completed its shoot in 2017 but faced production and legal delays before releasing on 30 October 2020 through a digital platform.

== Synopsis ==
The film is based on the Swathi murder case, which took place at the Nungambakkam railway station in Chennai in June 2016.

== Cast ==
- Ajmal Ameer as Inspector Shankar
- Praveenkumar Mano as Rajkumar
- Ayraa as Sumathi
- A. Venkatesh as Advocate Durai
- G. Gnanasambandam as Lawyer
- R. N. R. Manohar as DGP Muthusamy
- Rajkanth as Police Inspector
- Munnar Ramesh as Jailer Shanmuga Pandian
- Ganesh as Police Commissioner
- S. V. Thangaraj as Sivakumar

== Production ==
Director Ramesh Selvan and writer R. B. Ravi scripted the film Swathi Kolai Vazhaku on the Swathi murder case. Rookie actors Ayra and Mano from Koothu-P-Pattarai have were cast to play Swathi and Ramkumar, respectively, while Ajmal was signed to play the role of the Nungambakkam inspector investigating the murder, and A. Venkatesh reprised the role of Ramraj, Ramkumar's lawyer. After completing shoot in early 2017, a trailer was released by actors Vishal and Arya in May 2017.

The father of Swathi and the brother of Ramkumar expressed their objections to the film, prompting Ramesh to change the script, character names and title to Nungambakkam. The censor board made a series of further cuts, prompting the team to reshoot more scenes. The film was delayed even further after politician Thol. Thirumavalavan raised an objection to the film's release for portraying dalits in a demeaning manner. He opted to drop his case after a special screening.

== Release and reception ==
Following the production delays, the team prepared to release the film in July and then August 2019. However, the film was postponed and failed to have a theatrical release.

In October 2020, the team released the film on 30 October 2020 through the streaming service, CiniFlix. After a poor response on the service, the film re-released in theatres on 20 November. Cinema Express called the film "a tedious watch with lackadaisical storytelling". Maalai Malar reviewed the film more positively, appreciating the direction and background music, but was mildly critical of the cinematography.
