= Madurai 16 =

Indian Tamil-language political revenge thriller film

- Directed by: John Thomas
- Written by: Jean Williams; John Thomas
- Produced by: Sridevi Chinnaiah
- Starring: Jerome Vijay; Rishi Misty; Vima
- Cinematography: Rizwan Khan
- Edited by: A. Ashwin
- Music by: A. Santhosh Arumugam
- Production company: JS Films
- Distributed by: Uthraa Productions
- Release date: 12 September 2025
- Country: India
- Language: Tamil

Madurai 16 is a 2025 Indian Tamil-language political revenge thriller film directed by John Thomas and produced by Sridevi Chinnaiah under the banner JS Films. The story was written by Jean Williams and John Thomas. The film stars Jerome Vijay, Rishi Misty, and Vimal in the lead roles, with Dhuruvan, Madurai Prasanna, Nivedha Dinesh, and P. Prassana in supporting roles. Distributed by Uthraa Productions, the film was released on 12 September 2025.

== Cast ==
- Jerome Vijay
- Rishi Misty
- Vimal
- Dhuruvan
- Madurai Prasanna
- Nivedha Dinesh
- P. Prassana

== Production ==
The film was produced by Sridevi Chinnaiah under JS Films. The cinematography was handled by Rizwan Khan, editing by A. Ashwin, and the music was composed by A. Santhosh Arumugam. As of mid-2025, filming for the film was complete and post-production work was underway.

== Release ==
Madurai 16 was released theatrically on 12 September 2025 and distributed by Uthraa Productions. Due to several films being released on the same day, the film got fewer screens.

== Reception ==
Dinakaran critic stated that "There are some scenes that remind us of the Nungambakkam Swathi murder case."

Maalai Malar critic wrote that "The director has set the screenplay of people who think that if they have money and power, they can do whatever they want to take revenge for a friend"
