= Appukutty =

Indian actor and comedian

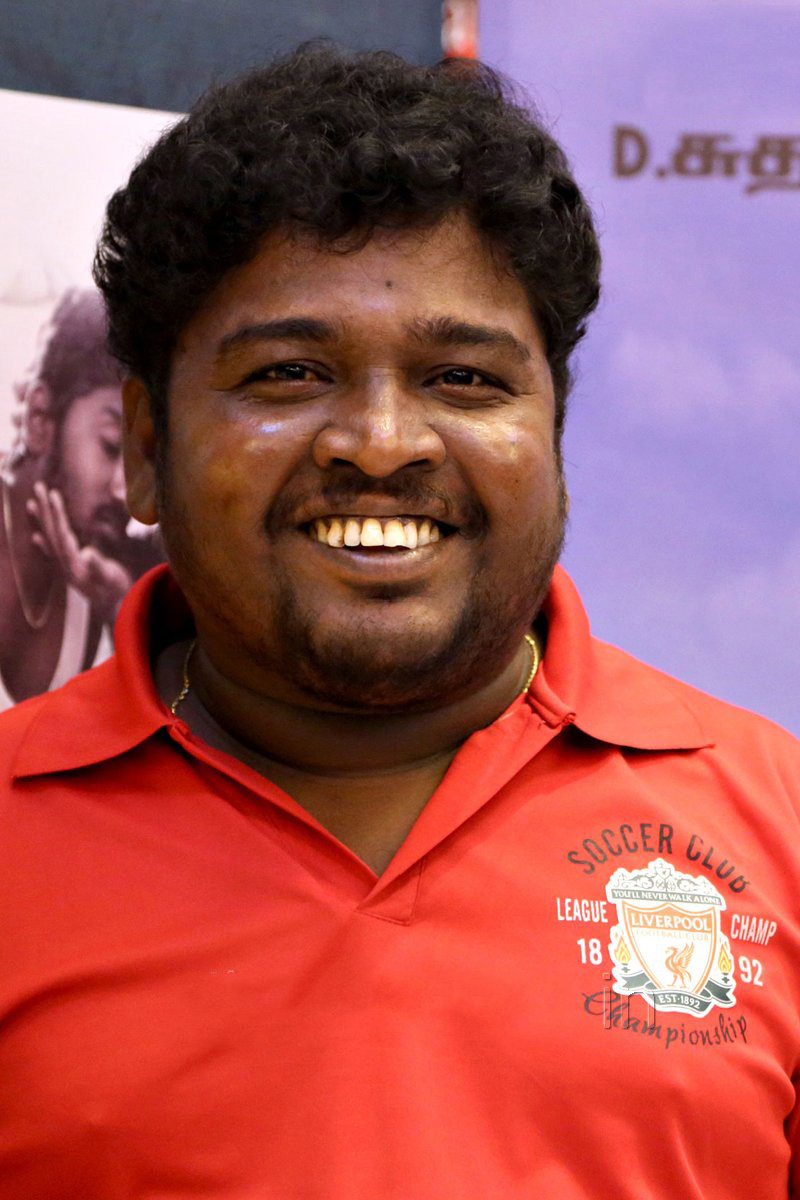
- Born: Sivabalan; 7 May 1984 (age 42); Nathan Kinaru, Thootukudi district, Tamilnadu
- Occupation: Actor
- Years active: 1998–present

Sivabalan, better known as Appukutty, is an Indian actor and comedian, who mainly appears in Tamil films. He became recognized following his performance in Vennila Kabadi Kuzhu. His role as Azhagarsami in Azhagarsamiyin Kudhirai was praised by film critics and fetched him the National Film Award for Best Supporting Actor.

== Early life ==
Appukutty hails from a village Nathan Kinaru in Thoothukudi district, Tamil Nadu. He moved to Chennai in 1994, initially in search of a job for survival only. Sivabalan was working as a cleaner in hotels, when he was spotted by film personalities and received acting offers from them. He then began acting in small character roles.

== Career ==
In an interview in 2011, Sivabalan stated that he always wanted to be a comedian and that he had appeared in several minor roles for over 17 years, before gaining recognition in Suseenthiran's Vennila Kabadi Kuzhu. Suseenthiran went on to cast him in the lead role in his comedy drama film Azhagarsamiyin Kudhirai (2011) for which he changed his stage name to Appukutty from Sivabalan upon . For his performance in the film, Appukutty won the National Film Award for Best Supporting Actor, while the film was named the Best Popular Film Providing Wholesome Entertainment of 2011. In 2011 he also appeared in an important role in the film Kullanari Koottam and played a character role in Mohanlal's 300th film Snehaveedu. In 2012, he acted in Mannaru as lead role, next Sundarapandian as supporting cast. He also played with Ajith Kumar in movies such as Veeram (2014) and Vedalam (2015). He also played an important character in Vendhu Thanindhathu Kaadu (2022) directed by Gautham Vasudev Menon.

== Filmography ==
Year	Film	Role	Notes
1998	Maru Malarchi	Tea seller	Uncredited role
2002	Solla Marandha Kadhai	Prabakaran	Uncredited role
2002	Shree	Tea seller	uncredited role
2004	Ghilli	Assistant priest at Velu's house	Uncredited role
2005	Maayavi	Volleyball player	Uncredited role
2005	ABCD	Bus passenger	Uncredited role
2007	Azhagiya Tamil Magan	Priest	Uncredited role
2007	Deepavali		Uncredited role
2007	Onbadhu Roobai Nottu		
2007	Nee Naan Nila	Student	
2008	Akku	Man at the barber shop	Uncredited role
2008	Ezhuthiyatharadi	Roja's friend	
2008	Raman Thediya Seethai		Uncredited role
2008	Velvi	Chandru's friend	
2009	Vennila Kabadi Kuzhu	Appukutty	
2009	Vaigai	Kulumai	
2010	Ambasamudram Ambani	Dhandapani's neighbour	
2010	Madrasapattinam	Kaali	
2010	Virunthali	Kaadu	
2010	Bale Pandiya	Car owner	
2011	Kullanari Koottam	Lenin	
2011	Azhagarsamiyin Kuthirai	Azhagarsami	National Film Award for Best Supporting Actor
2011	Mudhal Idam		
2011	Snehaveedu	Pazhanisamy	Malayalam film
2012	Pachai Engira Kaathu		
2012	Mattuthavani		
2012	Mannaru	Mannaru	
2012	Sundarapandian	Bhuvaneshwaran	
2012	Thiruthani	Velu's friend	
2013	Isaac Newton S/O Philipose	Karuppayya	Malayalam film
2013	Moondru Per Moondru Kaadhal		
2013	Maryan	Sakkarai	
2013	Summa Nachunu Irukku	Appukutty	
2014	Veeram	Mayilvaganam	
2014	Kaadhal 2014		
2015	Suzhiyam Ezhu		
2015	Vedalam	Kuzhandai	
2015	Urumeen	Security and Viduthalai	
2015	Paayum Puli		Guest appearance
2016	24	Chettiyar's brother	
2016	Kagitha Kappal	Chellappa	
2017	Mupparimanam	Logu	
2017	Enbathettu		
2017	Konjam Konjam	Sivabalan	
2017	Theru Naaigal	Kathir	
2017	Nenjil Thunivirundhal	Kumar's friend	
2018	Koottali		
2018	Kaathiruppor Pattiyal	Sathish	
2018	Enga Kattula Mazhai	Kuberan	
2019	100% Kadhal	Appu	
2019	Vennila Kabaddi Kuzhu 2	Appukutty	
2020	Maayanadhi	Mani	
2020	Galtha		
2020	Onbathu Kuzhi Sampath	Saami	
2020	Routtu		
2021	Maara	Lingam	
2021	Aadhangam		
2021	Boom Boom Kaalai		
2021	Namma Oorukku Ennadhan Achu	Nalla Thambi's uncle	
2022	Vendhu Thanindhathu Kaadu	Saravanan	
2022	Katchikkaaran	Party worker	
2022	Mr Daddy		
2023	Vallavanukkum Vallavan		
2023	Angaaragan		
2023	Margazhi Thingal	Raasu	
2024	Sooriyanum Sooriyagandhiyum		
2024	Nagendran's Honeymoons	Tamil village man	Malayalam series
2025	Kalan		
2025	Piranthanaal Vazhthukal		
2025	Yaadhum Ariyaan		
2026	Parundhu		
