= S. Hari Uthraa =

Indian film director, Producer, and film Distributor

- Born: Chennai, Tamil Nadu, India
- Occupations: Film producer, Film director, Film Distributor
- Website: Official website

S. Hari Uthraa is an Indian film director, producer, and film distributor, who works in Tamil films.

== Career ==
Hari Uthraa made his debuted direction film Theru Naaigal film was released in theatres.The film was received positive reviews from critics, A critic from Times of India gave three starts out of five and stated that "Still, as a debut film, Theru Naaigal manages to be a minor success." After that he made film Padithavudan Kilithu Vidavum which is comedy horror film talkes about insurance fraud. Later he directed and produced Galtha movie film released in 2020 and received mixed reviews from the critics.

S. Hari Uthraa has formed a production house named as Uthraa Productions and also runs nonprofit organization under the name of Uthraa Foundation.

== Filmography ==
Year	Films	Director	Producer
2017	Theru Naaigal	Yes	No
2018	Padithavudan Kizhithu Vidavum	Yes	No
2020	Galtha	Yes	Yes
2023	Vil Vithai	Yes	Yes
2023	En 6 Vaathiyaar Kaalpanthatta Kuzhu	Yes	Yes
2025	Kanneera	No	Yes

=== As distributor ===
Year	Movie
2023	Karungaapiyam
2023	Web
2023	Angaaragan
2024	Iravin Kangal
2024	Padikada Pakkangal
2025	Madurai 16
2025	Kutram Thavir
2025	Maria
2025	Kambi Katna Kathai
2026	Granny
2026	Aazhi
2026	Vowels
