= Piranthanaal Vazhthukal =

2025 Indian Tamil drama film

- Theatrical release poster
- Directed by: Raju Chandra
- Written by: Raju Chandra
- Produced by: Roji Mathew; Raju Chandra
- Starring: Appukutty; Aishwarya Anilkumar; Sreeja Ravi; Roji Mathew
- Cinematography: Raju Chandra
- Edited by: Thahir Hamsa
- Music by: G.K.V; Navneet
- Production companies: Plan3 Studioz & Mathens Group
- Release date: 21 February 2025
- Country: India
- Language: Tamil

Piranthanaal Vazhthukal (transl. Happy Birthday) is a 2025 Indian Tamil-language drama film written and directed by Raju Chandra. The film stars Appukutty and Aishwarya Anilkumar in the lead roles, alongside Sreeja Ravi and Roji Mathew. The film was produced by Roji Mathew and Raju Chandra under the banner of Plan3 Studioz and Mathens Group.

Piranthanaal Vazhthukal was released in theaters on 21 February 2025.

== Cast ==
- Appukutty
- Aishwarya Anilkumar
- Sreeja Ravi
- Roji Mathew
- Santhosh Swaminathan
- Zulfiya Majeed

== Production ==
The film is written and directed by Raju Chandra, who also served as the cinematographer. The editing was handled by Thahir Hamsa, while G. K. V. and Navneet served as the music composers. The film was shot in Pollachi, areas nearby Aliyar Dam and Wagamon in Kerala.

== Reception ==
A critic from Dinakaran wrote that "The director of the film has taken care of the cinematography. He has captured the greenery of Pollachi and the beauty of the village where simple families live in a simple budget." A critic from Maalai Malar gave it a mixed review.

== Recognition ==
Piranthanaal Vazhthukal received an Official Selection in the Indian Panorama section at the 56th International Film Festival of India (IFFI) in 2025.

== Film Festivals ==
Piranthanaal Vazhthukal premiered at several notable film festival, including:

- Official selection in the Indian Panorama section at the 56th International Film Festival of India (IFFI), 2025 - premiered with a red-carpet screening
- Screened at the Puducherry Film Festival, 2026
- Screened at the Habitat Film Festival, 2026 - New Delhi - India's Finest Cinema
