= Granny (2026 film) =

- Theatrical release poster
- Directed by: Vijaya Kumaran
- Written by: Vijaya Kumaran
- Produced by: Vijaya Mary; T. Saravanan
- Starring: Vadivukkarasi
- Cinematography: A. Manikandan
- Edited by: M. S. Gopi
- Music by: Chelliah Pandian
- Production company: Vijaya Mary Universal Media
- Distributed by: Uthraa Productions
- Release date: 30 January 2026
- Running time: 124 minutes
- Country: India
- Language: Tamil

Granny is a 2026 Indian Tamil-language supernatural horror film written and directed by Vijaya Kumaran. The film stars Vadivukkarasi, leading an ensemble cast that includes Dileepan, Singampuli, Gajaraj, Ananth Nag and Aparna. It was released on 30 January 2026 to mixed reviews and did not perform well at the box office.

== Plot ==
A couple from London, along with their two deaf-mute children, return to their ancestral home in the Tamil Nadu-Kerala border. Strange thing begin happening when an ageing woman named Ochayi shows up at their house and is given shelter.

== Cast ==
- Vadivukkarasi as Ochayi
- Dileepan as the police officer
- Singampuli as the police constable
- Gajaraj as the village head
- Ananth Nag as the house owner
- Aparna as the house owner's wife
- Master Ghanshyam as the house owner's son
- Baby Sandrea as the house owner's daughter

== Production ==
In early January 2026, it was announced that Vadivukkarasi would be headlining a film titled Granny, directed by Vijaya Kumaran (who previously directed Brahma.com in 2017) and produced by Vijay Mary Universal Media. It is the company's first production venture. Cinematography was handled by A. Manikandan, editing by M. S. Gopi, art direction by P. B. K. Mahendran and action choreography by Action Prakash.

== Soundtrack ==
The soundtrack was composed by Chelliah Pandian.

Track listing
No.	Title	Singer(s)	Length
1.	"Otchi Kelavi"	Punya	3:56
2.	"Erezh Ulagathil"	Ayshwarya Venkat	2:44
Total length:			6:40

== Release ==
Granny was release in theatres on 30 January 2026, and was distributed by Uthraa Productions. It failed at the box office due to its limited reach, and began streaming on Sun NXT from 6 March.

== Reception ==
Granny received mixed reviews from critics. Maalai Malar praised the cast performances, especially that of Vadivukkarasi, Ananth Nag and Aparna, along with the background score and cinematography but felt the screenplay was slow-paced in the second half and rated the film 2/5. Dinakaran made similar comments about the cast performances, score and cinematography. Dina Thanthi wrote that Vadivukkarasi managed to deliver scares through her gaze facial expressions with hardly any dialogue throughout the film, and also praised the other actors' flawless performances, adding that Manikandan and Chelliah Pandian hold the film together.

Dinamalar rated the film 2.3/5, praising Vadivukkarasi's performance but was annoyed by Singampuli's character being over-talkative, felt the background score was only okay, the flashback scenes related to Vadivukkarasi's character were unexciting and the film's pacing was hampered by unnecesary scenes related to the policemen and the village head. Johnson of Puthiya Thalaimurai reviewed the film far more negatively with a 0.5/5 rating, feeling Vadivukkarasi's poor makeup obscured her strong performance. Johnson also criticsed the CG, lack of scariness and said that because many scenes were shot in extreme darkness it was hard to understand the happenings.
