= Vil Vithai =

- Release poster
- Directed by: S. Hari Uthraa
- Written by: S. Hari Uthraa
- Produced by: S. Hari Uthraa
- Starring: Arun Micheal Daniel; Aarathya; Janaki Amma; Guna; S. M. T. Karunanidhi; Vaishnavi
- Cinematography: R. N. Shivakumar
- Edited by: Kishore M.
- Music by: AJ Alimirzaq
- Production company: Uthraa Productions
- Release date: 7 July 2023
- Country: India
- Language: Tamil

Vil Vithai (transl. Archery) is a 2023 Tamil-language social thriller film directed by S. Hari Uthraa. The film stars Arun Micheal Daniel and Aarathya with Janaki Amma, Guna, S. M. T. Karunanidhi, and Vaishnavi in supporting roles. The film is co-produced by S. Hari Uthraa and Arun Micheal Daniel under the banner of Uthraa Productions. The film released on 7 July 2023.

== Cast ==
- Arun Micheal Daniel
- Aarathya
- Janaki Amma
- Guna
- S. M. T. Karunanidhi
- Vaishnavi
- Kozhuvai R. Suresh Kumar
- Mannai Maari
- Marimuthu
- Poongodi
- Dhanasekharan

== Production ==
The film's cinematography was done by R N. Shivakumar. The editing of the film was handled by Kishore M. Theatrical rights of the film have been acquired by Mukil Creations.

== Reception ==
A critic from Dina Thanthi wrote that " Director Hari Utra has tried to make it a socially conscious film. The compelling screenplay tells that women are being harassed in some places even though they have improved in the society."

Maalai Malar critic stated that "A role where the protagonist Arun Michael can showcase his acting skills. He used it well and scored. Initially mild-mannered, he shows a different face when he tracks down sex offenders"
