= Angaaragan =

- Release poster
- Directed by: Mohan Dachu
- Written by: Karundhel Rajesh; Sreepathy
- Produced by: Geena Jomon; Jomon Philip
- Starring: Sathyaraj; Sreepathy KA; Niya Sankarathil; Reina Karad
- Cinematography: Mohan Dachu
- Edited by: Madurai Valar Pandian
- Music by: Ku Karthik
- Production companies: Julien & Jeroma Film Company; Primerose Entertainment
- Distributed by: Uthraa Productions
- Release date: 8 September 2023
- Country: India
- Language: Tamil

Angaaragan is a 2023 Indian Tamil-language horror thriller film written and directed by Mohan Dachu. The film stars Sathyaraj, Sreepathy KA, Niya Sankarathil, Reina Karad and Appukutty. The film was produced by Geena Jomon and Jomon Philip under the banner of Julien & Jeroma Film Company and Primerose Entertainment.

== Plot ==
The story revolves around a police officer who makes an unexpected visit to the resort. The investigation also opens up multiple hidden secrets of paranormal activities related to a late-Queen who was the first owner of this estate in which the resort is located. The investigation leads to invoking of further issues in the resort and what happens next is how the play is designed in the film

== Cast ==
- Sathyaraj as Assistant Commissioner Adhiveera Pandian
- Sreepathy KA
- Niya Sankarathil
- Appukutty as Pavadasamy Security Guard
- Angadi Theru Mahesh as Siva
- K. C. Prabath
- Guru Chandran
- Reina Karad as Pujita and Queen Regina
- Gayathri Damodaran
- Roshan Udayakumar
- Neha Rose
- Vipin Gopi
- Kiruba
- M. A. Rahim
- Sushma
- Sophie Antony
- Diya

== Production ==
The film is the directorial debut of Mohan Dachu. Makers of the film announced that Sathyaraj will be playing negative role. The film received U/A certificate from Central Board of Film Certification.

== Reception ==
The film was released on 8 September 2023. A critic from Maalai Malar wrote that as a major part of the story takes place at night, director Mohan Dachu has shot the scenes well, and music director Ku. Karthik is trying to scare the fans to some extent. Thanthi TV gave a mixed review.
