= Galtha =

2020 Indian Tamil-language political thriller film

- Theatrical release poster
- Directed by: S. Hari Uthraa
- Produced by: Malarkodi Raghupati; S. Hari Uthraa; R Usha
- Starring: Sivanishanth; Ayraa; Antony
- Cinematography: B Vasu
- Edited by: Muthu Maniasamy
- Music by: K Jai Krish
- Production companies: Malar Movie Makers; I Creations
- Distributed by: MMM Raghupathi
- Release date: 28 February 2020
- Running time: 111 minutes
- Country: India
- Language: Tamil

Galtha is a 2020 Indian Tamil-language political thriller directed by S. Hari Uthraa. The film stars Sivanishanth, Ayra, and Antony, and is based on several true incidents of illegal dumping of medical waste and other hazardous waste form neighbouring states such as Kerala on Tamilnadu border districts such as Puliyarai and Valliyoor in Tirunelveli district and border villages of Coimbatore. It was released on 28 February 2020.

== Plot ==
The plot of the film revolves around a fictional village called Thannilankadu and the political influence on the villages where the waste is being dumped. With the help of local political influence the trucks with medical and other waste are illegally transported through Tamil Nadu checkpost while returning from Kerala. The story travels on a village backdrop on how these hazardous waste causes numerous health problems and a sudden outbreak of an unknown virus and how the people are reacting to the situation.

== Cast ==
- Sivanishanth as Lenin
- Ayraa as Isaiarasi
- Merku Thodarchi Malai Antony as Guna
- Divya
- S. M. T. Karunanidhi
- Appukutty
- Gajaraj as Church Father
- Rajasimman
- Thangadurai
- Kozhuvai R. Suresh Kumar
- Kaaka Muttai Sasikumar
- Thiruvallur Muthuveera
- Kambam Gunaji

== Release ==
Galtha was released on 28 February 2020. It was released in overseas territories by United India Exporters.

== Reception ==
M Suganth of The Times of India gave the film one out of five stars and wrote that "There is amateurishness on all fronts, from the writing to the acting to the scoring". Dinamalar praised the background music while criticising the shortcomings of the story. Maalai Malar praised the music and cinematography.
