= Theru Naaigal =

- Directed by: S. Hari Uthraa
- Produced by: Sushil Kumar Jain
- Starring: Prateek; Akshatha Sreedhar; Madhu Soodhanan; Mime Gopi; Sai Dheena; Imman Annachi; Appukutty; Ramachandran Durairaj
- Cinematography: Thalapathy Rathinam
- Edited by: Meenatchy Sundar
- Music by: Harish—Satish
- Production companies: Shree Bhuwal Movie Productions; I Creations
- Release date: 22 September 2017
- Country: India
- Language: Tamil

Theru Naaigal (transl. Street dogs) is a 2017 Indian Tamil-language action drama film written and directed by S. Hari Uthraa. The film stars Pratheek and Akshatha Sreedhar, with an ensemble cast of actors including Madhu Soodhanan, Mime Gopi, Sai Dheena, Appukutty, Imman Annachi, Pavel Navageethan, and Ramachandran Durairaj in pivotal roles. The film began production during mid-2016 and was released on 22 September 2017 to mixed reviews from critics.

== Cast ==
- Pratheek as Kumar
- Akshatha Sreedhar Shastry
- Madhu Soodhanan as Chokkalingam
- Mime Gopi as Inspector Marudhamuthu
- Sai Dheena as Settu
- Imman Annachi as Krishnan
- Ramachandran Durairaj as Ramu
- Appukutty as Kathir
- Pavel Navageethan as Vinoth
- Aaru Bala as Bala
- Gajaraj as Politician
- Muthuraman
- Sushil Kumar as Seth
- Cool Suresh as Maruthamuthu's assistant
- Sampath Ram as Gaja
- Rekha Suresh
- Birlaa Bose as Collector
- Nilani
- Saranya

== Production ==
Hari Uthraa scripted the film and based the key plot points around corporate interventions and issues that farmers face due to it. He revealed that it was initially difficult to find a producer due to the controversial subject, before I Creations agreed to finance the film. The film passed the certification board with a U certificate. About the process, Hari noted that the board were initially sceptical about the content and thought it was against the government, as it takes on the issues of methane extraction, but were later satisfied.

== Soundtrack ==
Theru Naaigal

Soundtrack album by Harish & Satish
- Released: 28 July 2017
- Language: Tamil
- Label: Music 247

The film's music was composed by duo Harish & Satish, while the audio rights of the film was acquired by Music 247. The album released on 28 July 2017 and featured four songs.

Track list
No.	Title	Lyrics	Singer(s)	Length
1.	"Meesaiya Muruki"	GKB	Hide Karthik	3:44
2.	"Netrikannai Thirandhidu"	Ma-Sha	Harish	2:15
3.	"Kaatukula Sikirichu"	Lalithanand	Mahalingam	4:21
4.	"Kangal Kathai Pesutho"	Muthamil	Vaikom Vijayalakshmi	4:18
5.	"Theru Naaigal"	—	—	2:45
6.	"Dark Night"	—	—	1:55

== Release ==
Theru Naaigal had a theatrical release across Tamil Nadu alongside eight other films, which became the most crowded release date of 2017 in Chennai. The film opened on 22 September 2017 to mixed reviews, with the critic from The Times of India stating the film "manages to be a minor success". The critic added that "the use of fractured timelines is what makes Theru Naaigal different from the umpteen ones we have seen till date" and "this approach keeps us guessing about what is at play and what is at stake, and the film remains engaging for the most parts". However, the critic stated "what stops the film from being truly good is the flashback portion that is a bit too long and digresses a little to include a romantic track, which seems to have been added on as a compromise". Rakesh Mehar of NewsMinute.com stated "Theru Naaigal tries for gritty realism, but ends up delivering a single-tone film that drags beyond its actual runtime", adding "not that Theru Naaigal doesn't have the ingredients for a good film", "it is moderately engaging but fails to engage fully because it overplays its hand — and with a subtler touch and a little restraint, it could make for great viewing".
