= Kanneera =

2025 Indian family drama film

- Theatrical release poster
- Directed by: Kathir Raven S
- Written by: Kausalya Nawaratnam
- Produced by: S. Hari Uthraa
- Starring: Kathir Raven S; Chandhine Kaur; Maya Glammy; Nanthakumar NKR
- Cinematography: Yehganesh Nair
- Music by: Hari Maaran
- Production companies: Uthraa Productions; More Four Production
- Release date: 14 February 2025
- Country: India
- Language: Tamil

Kanneera (transl. Teardrops) is a 2025 Indian Tamil-language romantic, family drama film directed by Kathir Raven S. The film stars Kathir Raven S and Chandhine Kaur in the lead roles, alongside Maya Glammy and Nanthakumar NKR. The film was produced by S. Hari Uthraa under the banner of Uthraa Productions and More Four Production.

Kanneera was released in theatres on 14 February 2025.

== Cast ==
- Kathir Raven S
- Chandhine Kaur
- Maya Glammy
- Nanthakumar NKR

== Production ==
The film is directed by Kathir Raven S and written by Kausalya Nawaratnam. Yehganesh Nair is the cinematographer, and Hari Maaran is the music composer.

== Reception ==
A Dina Thanthi critic stated that "Director Kathiraven captures attention by presenting the conflicting love problems of the two couples in an interesting way with twists and turns". Anupama Subramanian of Deccan Chronicle rated it two out of five.
