= Kodambakkam railway station =

Railway station in Chennai, India

Kodambakkam
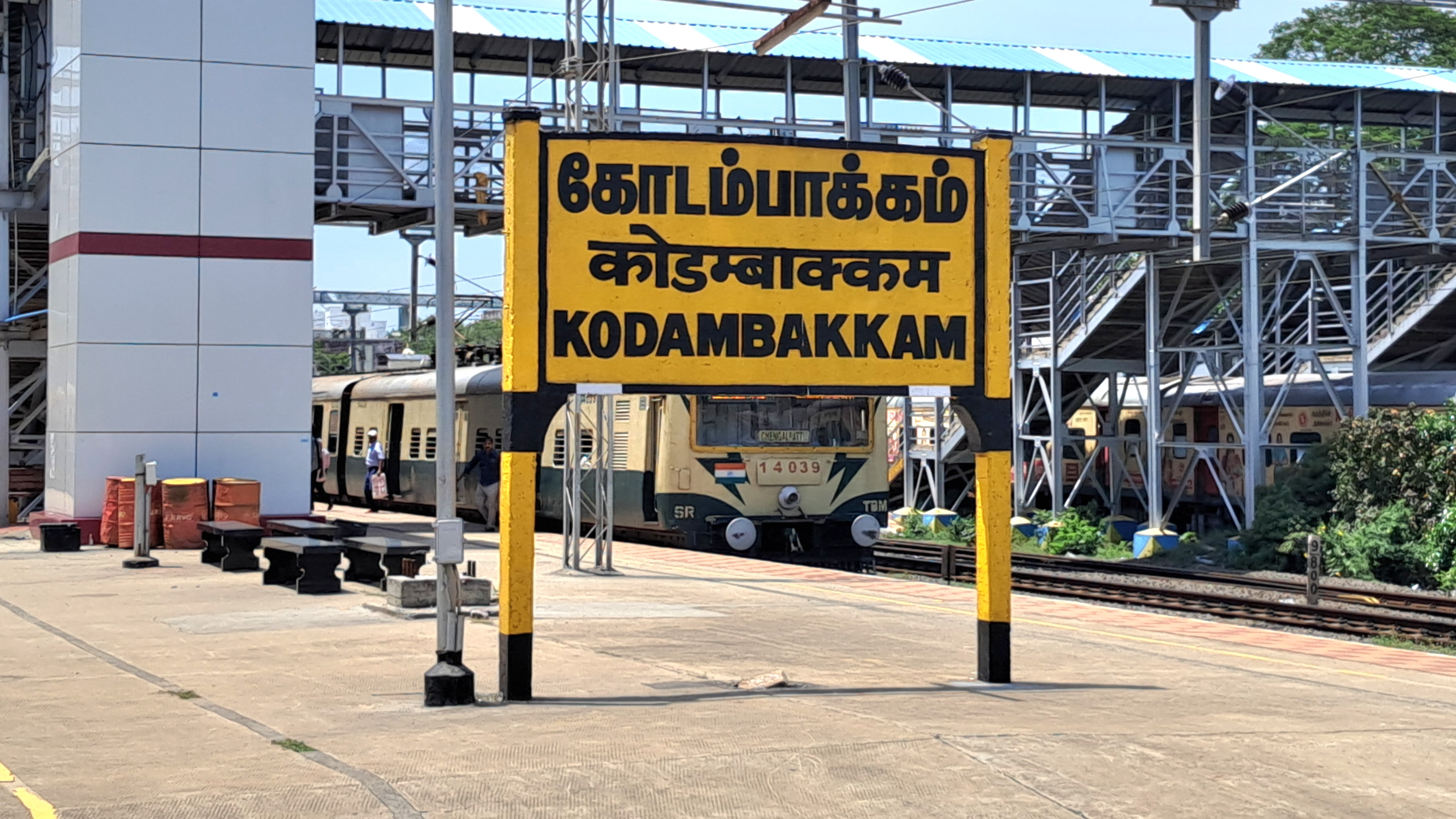
- Kodambakkam railway station as of June 2025

General information
- Coordinates: 13.0520°N 80.2307°E
- System: Indian Railways and Chennai Suburban Railway station
- Owner: Ministry of Railways, Indian Railways
- Lines: South and South West lines of Chennai Suburban Railway
- Connections: Yellow Line Kodambakkam; Mahalingapuram MTC bus stop

Construction
- Structure type: Standard on-ground station
- Parking: Available

Other information
- Status: Active
- Station code: MKK
- Fare zone: Southern Railways

History
- Opened: Early 1900s
- Electrified: 1931
- Former names: South Indian Railway

Services
Preceding station	Chennai Suburban	Following station
Nungambakkam towards Chennai Beach	South Line	Mambalam towards Tambaram, Chengalpattu Junction or Villupuram Junction
Route map
Chennai Beach — Villupuram
Location

Kodambakkam Railway Station is a railway station on the Chennai Beach–Chengalpattu section of the Chennai Suburban Railway Network. It serves the neighbourhood of Kodambakkam, Vadapalani, and Ashok Nagar. The railway station was already in existence when the Chennai Egmore-Kanchipuram suburban railway was opened in 1911.

== History ==
The station lies in the Chennai Beach–Tambaram section of the Chennai Suburban Railway Network. With the completion of track-lying work in March 1931, which began in 1928, the suburban services were started on 11 May 1931 between Beach and Tambaram, and was electrified on 15 November 1931, with the first MG EMU services running on 1.5 kV DC. The section was converted to 25 kV AC traction on 15 January 1967.

== The station ==
=== Platforms ===
There are a total of 4 platforms and 4 tracks. The platforms are connected by foot overbridge. These platforms are built to accumulate 12 coaches EMU train. The platforms are equipped with modern facility like display board of arrival and departure of trains.

=== Station layout ===
G	Street level	Exit/Entrance & ticket counter
P1	FOB, Side platform | Doors will open on the left
P1	Platform 1	Towards → Chennai Beach; Next Station: Nungambakkam
P1	FOB, Island platform | P1 Doors will open on the left/right | P2 Doors will open on the right
P1	Platform 2	Towards ← Tambaram / Chengalpattu Jn / Villuppuram Jn; Next Station: Mambalam
P1	Platform 3	Towards → Chennai Egmore
P1	FOB, Island platform | P3 and P4 | (Express Line)
P1	Platform 4	Towards ← Chengalpattu Junction
P1

== Gallery ==
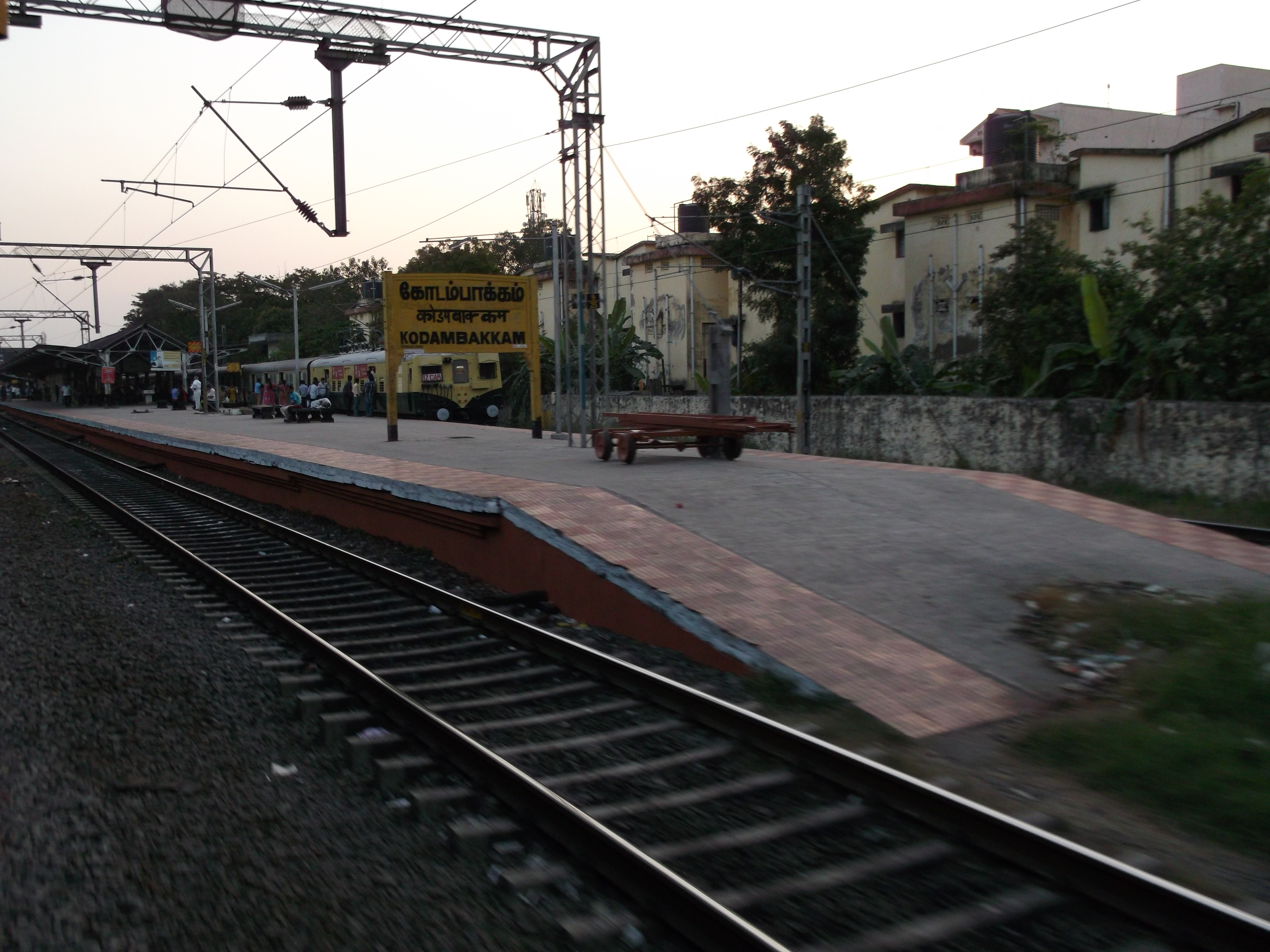
Kodambakkam station

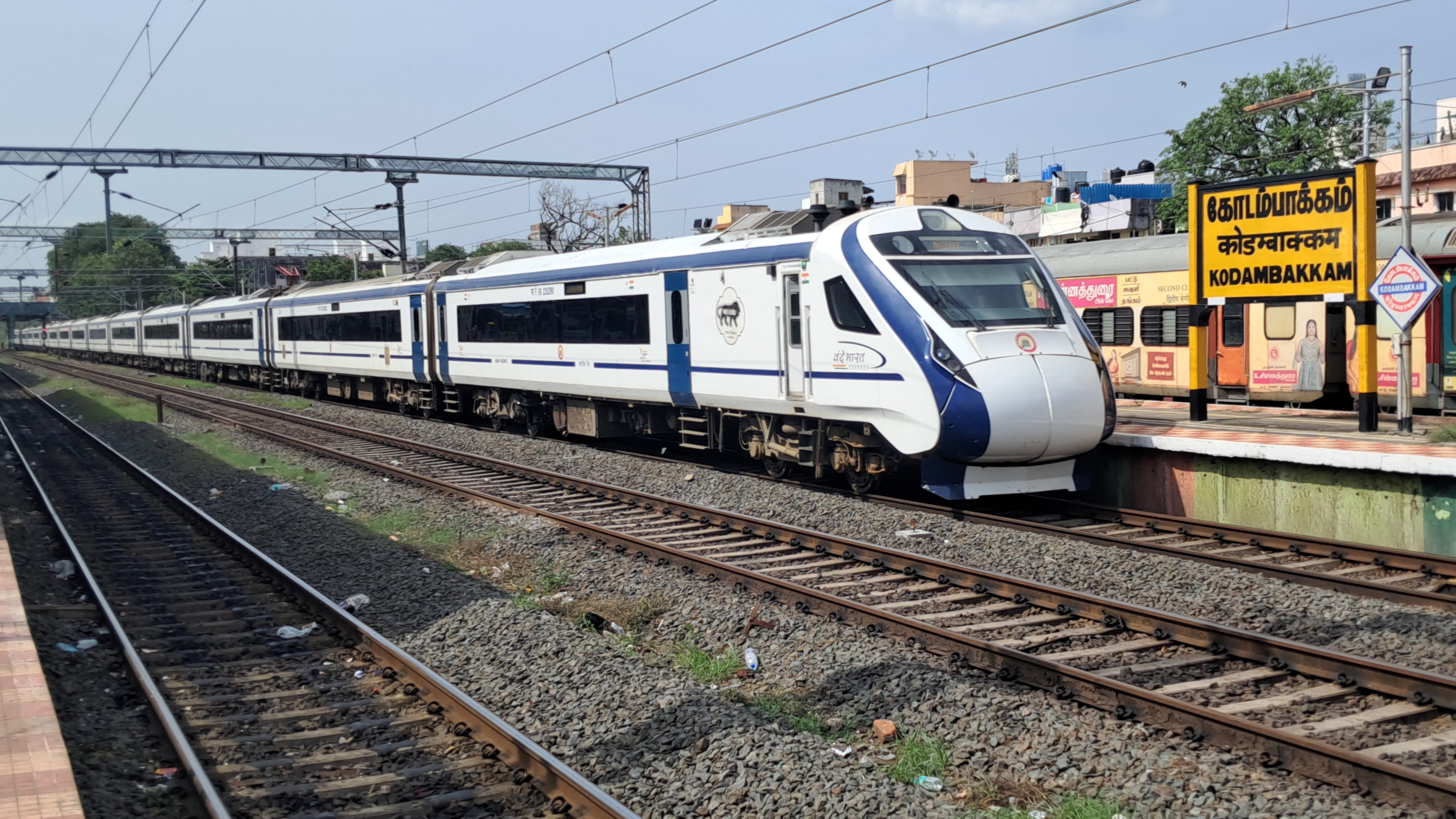
Nellai Vande Bharat Express crossing this station towards Tirunelveli Jn

== See also ==
- Chennai Suburban Railway
- Railway stations in Chennai
