= Kambi Katna Kathai =

2025 Tamil comedy film

- Theatrical release poster
- Directed by: Rajanathan Periyasamy
- Screenplay by: Tha. Muruganandham (Dialogues)
- Story by: Rajanathan Periyasamy
- Produced by: Ravi
- Starring: Natty Subramaniam; Singampuli
- Cinematography: MRM Jaisuresh
- Edited by: SN Fazil
- Music by: Satizsh Selvam
- Production company: Mangatha Movies
- Distributed by: Uthraa Productions
- Release date: 17 October 2025
- Running time: 139 minutes
- Country: India
- Language: Tamil

Kambi Katna Kathai (transl. spinning a yarn) is a 2025 Indian Tamil-language comedy film written and directed by Rajanathan Periyasamy and co-written along with Tha. Muruganandham. The film is produced by Ravi under his Mangatha Movies banner. The film stars Natty Subramaniam and Singampuli in the lead roles. The technical team consists of cinematography by MRM Jaisuresh, editing by SN Fazil, music by Satizsh Selvam, and art direction by Siva Yoga.

Kambi Katna Kathai released in theatres on 17 October 2025. The Tamil Nadu and Puducherry theatrical rights were acquired by Uthraa Productions.

== Cast ==
- Natty Subramaniam as Arivu
- Singampuli
- Mukesh Ravi as Vetri
- Sreeranjini
- Aarthi Shalini as Yazhini
- Java Sundaresan
- Karate Karthi
- TSR
- Muruganandam
- Muthuraman as an MLA
- Vetrivel Rajan
- Kothandam
- Sairadhi
- Karthick Kannan
- Aishwarya

== Music ==
The music was composed by Satizsh Selvam. The first single titled "Jala Pala Jala" was released on 11 October 2025.

No.	Title	Lyrics	Singer(s)	Length
1.	"Jala Pala Jala"	Ku Karthik	Anthony Daasan

== Reception ==
Abhinav Subramanian of The Times of India gave 2.5/5 stars and wrote "Kambi Katna Kathai coasts on familiar Tamil comedy territory without offering fresh angles, feeling somewhat like a Sundar C production stripped of glamour and polish. It avoids being outright cringeworthy, which counts for something, but rarely rises above passable weekend filler. For a film about digging up treasure, it never strikes gold." Rohini M of Cinema Express gave 2.5/5 stars and wrote "Kambi Katna Kathai proves that small-scale comedy films with lesser-known actors can still find a place in the audience’s hearts. Despite a few moments of double-meaning humor that test patience, the film’s lighthearted narrative and situational comedy make it a pleasant entertainer — one you can laugh through and walk out smiling." The film was reviewed by Maalai Malar.
