= Katchikkaaran =

2022 Tamil language action film

- Theatrical release poster
- Directed by: P. Iyyappan
- Produced by: Vijith Saravanan
- Starring: Vijith Saravanan; Swetha Dorathy; Appukutty
- Cinematography: Madhankumar
- Music by: C. M. Mahendra
- Production company: PSK Productions
- Release date: 16 December 2022
- Country: India
- Language: Tamil

Katchikkaaran (English: Party Worker) is a 2022 Indian Tamil-language action film directed by P. Iyyappan and starring Vijith Saravanan, Swetha Dorathy and Appukutty in the lead roles. It was released on 16 December 2022.

== Cast ==
- Vijith Saravanan
- Swetha Dorathy as Anjali
- Appukutty
- Sivasenathipathi
- A. R. Thenali
- Marudhu Pandian
- Jawahar
- Vijay Gautham
- C. N. Prabhakaran
- Vincent Rai

== Production ==
The film marked the second directorial venture of Iyappan after Dhoni Kabadi Kuzhu (2018). The film's producer Vijith Saravanan also appeared in the leading role.

Prior to the launch of the film, the team held an event to mark the release of the film's soundtrack in December 2022. During the event, veteran film producer K. Rajan and actor-journalist Bayilvan Ranganathan had a public fallout.

== Reception ==
The film was released on 16 December 2022 across Tamil Nadu. A critic from Maalai Malar gave the film 2.25 out of 5 stars, and labelled the film as "unimpressive". Reviewers from Dina Thanthi and Dina Malar also gave the film an unfavourable review. Film critic Malini Mannath wrote "Katchikkaran delivers much more than what one would have expected from a small budgeted film, which has no big names to boast of either in its cast or technical crew".
