= Atharva (2023 film) =

- Poster
- Directed by: Mahesh Reddy
- Written by: Kasarla Shyam; Kittu Vissapragada
- Produced by: Subhash Nuthalapati
- Starring: Karthik Raju; Simran Choudhary; Ayraa
- Cinematography: Charan Madhavaneni
- Music by: Sricharan Pakala
- Production company: Pego Entertainments
- Release date: 1 December 2023
- Country: India
- Language: Telugu

Atharva is a 2023 Indian Telugu-language crime thriller film directed by Mahesh Reddy. It marks the return of Karthik Raju as a lead actor after a hiatus and features Simran Choudhary and Ayraa in key roles. The film, centered on an investigative narrative, was released theatrically on 1 December 2023.

== Plot ==
The story follows Karna, portrayed by Karthik Raju, a determined individual who joins a clues team to solve a complex murder mystery with unexpected twists. The narrative focuses on forensic and investigative elements.

== Cast ==
- Karthik Raju as Karna
- Simran Choudhary as Nitya
- Ayraa as Joshni
- Shiva as Shiva
- Arvind Krishna
- Kabir Duhan Singh
- Gagan Vihari
- Kalpika Ganesh
- G. Marimuthu as K. Gnanavel

== Production ==
Atharva was produced by Subhash Nuthalapati under Pego Entertainments. The promotional campaign began in 2022 with the release of its title logo. Cinematography was handled by Charan Madhavaneni, with music by Sri Charan Pakala.

== Release ==
The film transitioned to OTT platforms after its theatrical release, with digital release dates announced.

=== Streaming rights ===
The streaming rights of the movie were acquired by ETV Win on 18 January 2024 and it also available both Lionsgate Play and Amazon Prime Video on 21 March 2025.

== Reception ==
The film received mixed reviews from critics and audiences. The Times of India highlighted Karthik Raju’s strong debut performance, adding to the film’s suspenseful appeal. The Hans India praised it as an engaging crime thriller with effective suspense. Conversely, Deccan Chronicle criticized its slow pacing and lack of originality, deeming it a passable thriller. OTTplay labeled it a dull and boring investigative thriller due to its narrative shortcomings. Sakshi noted a mixed reception, appreciating the suspense but highlighting execution flaws. Eenadu found it appealing for its investigative theme but predictable. Samayam Telugu recognized Karthik Raju’s effort but called the overall film modest. NTV Telugu praised the cast but found the plot lacking. Hindustan Times Telugu appreciated the crime thriller aspects but noted uneven pacing. Daijiworld critiqued its execution. Commercial performance was modest, with lukewarm box office returns.
