= En 6 Vaathiyaar Kaalpanthatta Kuzhu =

- Release poster
- Directed by: S. Hari Uthraa
- Written by: S. Hari Uthraa
- Produced by: S. Hari Uthraa; Dr. S.Prithi Shankar.
- Starring: S. Sharath Kumar; Ayraa Jain; Ganja Karuppu; Sona Heiden; Madhankumar Dhakshinamoorthy; Gajaraj
- Cinematography: Vinoth Raja
- Edited by: Kishore M.
- Music by: AJ Alimirzaq
- Production companies: Uthraa Productions; PSS Productions
- Distributed by: Uthraa Productions
- Release date: 15 September 2023
- Country: India
- Language: Tamil

En 6 Vaathiyaar Kaalpanthatta Kuzhu (transl. No.6- Vaathiyaar football team) is a 2023 Indian Tamil-language sports film written and directed by S. Hari Uthraa. The film stars S. Sharath Kumar, Ayraa Jain, Ganja Karuppu, Sona Heiden, Madhankumar Dhakshinamoorthy, and Gajaraj. The film was produced by S. Hari Uthraa and Dr. S. Prithi Shankar. under the banners of Uthraa Productions and PSS Productions, respectively. The music was composed by AJ Alimirzaq, and the film released on 15 September 2023.

== Cast ==
- S. Sharath Kumar
- Ayraa
- Ganja Karuppu
- Sona Heiden
- Madhankumar Dhakshinamoorthy
- Gajaraj

== Production ==
The Principal photography of film was held in Madurai, Paramakudi, Rameswaram and Ramanathapuram

== Reception ==
A critic from Dina Thanthi noted that "Director Hari Utra has given a quality film by telling a lively screenplay with a social purpose about how the ambition of many young people is destroyed despite their talent in the world of sports and the practical politics there"Thinaboomi critic wrote thart "The effort of the director who has taken new faces with less investment can be appreciated."
