= Keera (director) =

Indian film director

- Born: Tamil Nadu, India
- Occupation: Film director
- Years active: 2012-present

Keera is an Indian film director, who has directed Tamil language films. He became known for the rural drama Pachai Engira Kaathu (2012), and has gone on to make feature films including Ettuthikkum Para (2020) and Irumban (2023).

== Career ==
Keera first worked on the rural drama Pachai Engira Kaathu (2012) starring newcomers in the lead role. During the making of the film, he gave the film's debutant actress Saranya, the stage name of Devadhai. In the late 2010s, Keera worked on Ettuthikkum Para (2020), a social drama film based on honour killings headlined by Samuthirakani. The film released in March 2020 and became one of the final films to have a theatrical release before the COVID-19 pandemic caused a lockdown.

In December 2018, Keera announced that he was working on a project titled Kuravan featuring Jr MGR, a distant relative of former actor-politician M. G. Ramachandran, in the lead role. Following opposition to the title form tribal activists, the project proceeded under the name of Irumban (2023). During the release of the film, Keera's name was largely removed from the promotional posters, prompting him to call out the lead actor and producers for unfair treatment and lack of payment.

In January 2023, he announced that his next project would be titled Veeman, a tale on elephant mahouts.

== Filmography ==
Films

Year	Film	Notes
2012	Pachai Engira Kaathu	
2018	Merlin	
2020	Ettuthikkum Para	
2023	Irumban	
