= Irumban =

2023 tamil film

- Theatrical release poster
- Directed by: Keera
- Written by: Keera
- Produced by: Tamil Bala; R. Vinothkumar
- Starring: Junior MGR; Yogi Babu; Aishwarya Dutta
- Cinematography: Lenin Balaji
- Edited by: S. P. Ahamed
- Music by: Srikanth Deva
- Production company: Lemuria Movies
- Release date: 10 March 2023
- Country: India
- Language: Tamil

Irumban (transl. Iron man) is 2023 Indian Tamil-language drama film written and directed by Keera, and produced by Tamil Bala and R. Vinothkumar under, Lemuria Movies. It features Junior MGR, Yogi Babu, and Aishwarya Dutta in the lead roles with Shaji Choudhary, Sendrayan, Raksitha, Aswini, Manimaran, Sampath Ram, and Kayal Devaraj playing the pivotal roles. The film was released 10 March 2023 in theatres.

== Cast ==
- Junior MGR as Office
- Yogi Babu as Blade
- Aishwarya Dutta as Mahima
- Sendrayan as Aspathiri
- Shaji Choudhary
- Raksitha
- Aswini
- Aspathiri
- Sampath Ram
- Manimaran
- Kayal Devaraj
- Ooty Prince
- Thamizh Bala

== Production ==
In December 2018, Keera announced that he was working on a project titled Kuravan featuring Junior MGR in the lead role. Following opposition to the title form tribal activists who felt that the title was inaccurate for portraying their community as Marathis, the project proceeded under the name of Irumban (2023). During the release of the film, Keera's name was largely removed from the promotional posters, prompting him to call out the lead actor and producers for unfair treatment and lack of payment.

Some scenes of the film were shot in the middle of the sea in the Andaman and Nicobar Islands.

== Reception ==
The film was released 10 March 2023 in theatres. A critic from Dina Thanthi gave a mixed review and noted that "Cinematographer Lenin Balaji has brilliantly captured the beauty of the Mediterranean and the forest. Listen to 'Nanga Pudusa Kattikita Jodi' Remix song composed by Srikanth Deva. The background music also makes the story move faster. The slackness in the second half of the screenplay is a weakness for the film. Director Keera has shot a different love story briskly." A critic from Thinaboomi said that "Kudos to Lenin Balaji for the beautiful cinematography of the sea and storm scenes. Director Keera has tried to give it as an adventure thriller with love". A Maalai Malar critic gave a mixed review and noted that "Director Keera has conveyed the true story beautifully to the audience. The slackness in the second half of the screenplay is a weakness of the film. The unusual love story has been beautifully shot and is being appreciated."
