= Sampath Ram =

Indian actor

- Born: 28 October 1970 (age 55); Chennai, Tamil Nadu
- Occupation: Actor
- Years active: 1999–present
- Height: 6 ft 3 in (191 cm)

Sampath Ram is an Indian actor who works primarily in Tamil-language films. He is known for his villainous roles.

== Career ==
Ram started his acting career with the television series Ethanai Manithargal that aired on Doordarshan as a thug. He made his film debut with Mudhalvan (1999), where he played a sub-inspector of police. The film, however, failed to provide the actor a major break. Ram survived a head injury while shooting for Dheena (2001). After Dheena, he starred in several films as a thug. About twenty years later, Ram landed in a meaty role in Thimiru Pudichavan (2018). Post Thimiru Pudichavan, he garnered acclaim for his performance as an aghori in Kanchana 3. Ram signed Thatrom Thookrom, where he essays the main antagonist. His two-hundredth film Kasa Kasaa features him in the lead role.

== Selected filmography ==
=== Tamil films ===
Uncredited roles

Year	Film	Role	Notes and Ref.
1999	Mudhalvan	Sub-inspector	
2000	Vallarasu	Police officer	
2000	Unnai Kodu Ennai Tharuven		
2002	Red	Srini's henchman	
2004	Jana		
2007	Aalwar	Police officer	
2010	Rasikkum Seemane		

Credited roles

Year	Title	Role	Notes and Ref.
2001	Dheena	Aadikesavan's henchman	credited as Sampath Kumar
2001	Thavasi	Thief	
2002	Ramanaa	Rowdy	
2003	Kalatpadai	Henchman	
2003	Anjaneya	Palani Mani	
2004	Vasool Raja MBBS	Raja's sidekick	
2004	Chellamae	Kumar	credited as Sampath Kumar
2004	Bose	Police inspector	credited as Sampath Kumar
2005	Thirupaachi	Balu's henchman	
2006	Aathi		
2006	Kizhakku Kadarkarai Salai	Police officer	
2007	Pokkiri	Narasimman's henchman	
2007	Manikanda		
2007	Dhandayuthapani	Yaanai Kumar's henchman	
2007	Urchagam		credited as Sampath Kumar
2007	Piragu	SP Sivakumar	
2007	Kelvikuri	SI Rajendran	
2007	Rameshwaram	Refugee	
2008	Pattaya Kelappu		
2008	Vambu Sandai		
2008	Vedha	Inspector Kalaiyarasan	credited as Sampath
2008	Kanchivaram	Vengadam's brother-in-law	credited as Sampath Kumar
2008	Poi Solla Porom	Tsunami Sukumar	credited as Sambath
2009	Yavarum Nalam	Inspector Ilangovan	
2009	Karthik Anitha		
2009	Thoranai	Guru's henchman	
2009	Kadhal Kadhai	Karuppaiah	
2010	Madrasapattinam	Anbazhagan	
2010	365 Kadhal Kadithangal	Suruli	
2010	Agam Puram	Sampath	
2011	Kanchana	Kanchana's stabber	
2011	Vedi		
2011	Velayudham	Local goon	
2012	Kazhugu	Factory manager	
2012	Manam Kothi Paravai	Revathy's proposed groom	
2012	Kai	Sampath	
2012	Sattam Oru Iruttarai	Anand	
2012	Akilan	Police inspector	
2013	Kalla Thuppakki	PT teacher	
2014	Goli Soda		
2014	Vallinam		
2014	Athithi	Sudalai	
2014	Jaihind 2		special appearance in "Ayya Padichavare"
2014	Pongi Ezhu Manohara	Manohara's father	
2015	Yennai Arindhaal		Deleted scene
2015	Kaaki Sattai	Sampath	
2015	Maari	Pandi	
2015	Kalai Vedhan		
2015	Adhibar	Rajesh	
2015	Puli	Vedhalam	
2016	Manjal		
2016	Arthanari		
2016	Kabali	Sampath	
2016	Tamilselvanum Thaniyar Anjalum		
2016	Spyder	Rowdy	
2017	Theru Naaigal	Gaja	
2018	Nimir	Inspector	
2018	Antony		
2018	Vada Chennai	Police officer	
2018	Thimiru Pudichavan	Police constable	
2019	Viswasam	Kozhimuthu's aid	
2019	Boomerang	Inspector	
2019	Kanchana 3	Aghori	
2019	100	Inspector Jegadeesh	
2019	Kolaigaran	Ali	
2019	Puppy		
2020	Ettuthikkum Para	Police Inspector	
2020	Asuraguru	Henchman	
2020	Thatrom Thookrom	Chinna	
2021	Kasa Kasaa		Lead role
2021	Sangathalaivan	Police Officer	
2021	Kaadan	Moorthy (DFO)	
2021	IPC 376	Assistant Commissioner	
2021	Pirar Thara Vaaraa		
2022	Chota		
2022	1945	Police officer	
2022	Vikram	Member of Vetti Vagaiyara	
2022	Vattakara		
2023	Agilan	Ship worker	
2023	Irumban		
2023	Kattil		
2024	Chiclets		
2024	Thangalaan	Kaadaiyan's aide	
2024	Saala	Inspector	

=== Malayalam films ===
Year	Title	Role	Notes
2010	Janakan	ACP Vikraman	
2010	Shikkar	NIA Officer	
2011	Sevenes	Beypore Sreedharan	
2013	Isaac Newton S/O Philipose		
2018	Chanakya Thanthram	Thuthukudi Selvam	
2022	Malikappuram	Mahi	
2023	The Great Escape	Don Carlos	
2023	Kasargold	Vijay Pujari	
2024	Thankamani	Rtd. C. I. Eeppan Mattakkavil	
2024	Njan Kandatha Sare		
2024	Pongala †	TBA	

=== Telugu films ===
Year	Title	Role	Notes
2014	Jaihind 2		Special appearance
2017	Spyder	Rowdy	
2021	Aranya	Aadi (DFO)	
2022	1945	Police officer	
2023	Nene Naa	Police Inspector	
2023	Salaar: Part 1 – Ceasefire	Vedha	

=== Kannada films ===
Year	Title	Role	Notes
2013	Attahasa	Sethukuli Govindan	
2014	Abhimanyu		Special appearance
2015	Octopus		

=== Television ===
Year	Title	Channel	Notes
1975	Ethanai Manithargal	Doordarshan	
2002-2004	Rudra Veenai	Sun TV	
2021	Velammal	Star Vijay	

=== Web series ===
Year	Title	Role	Network	Notes
2020	PubGoa	Ayyanar	ZEE5 Originals	
2026	Mammatiyaan Stars	Periya Settu		
