= Mannaru =

2012 Indian Tamil-language film by Jai Shankar

- DVD Cover
- Directed by: S. Jai Shankar
- Written by: S. Jai Shankar; Thambi Ramaiah (dialogues)
- Starring: Appukutty; Thambi Ramaiah; Swati
- Cinematography: Agu Ajmal
- Edited by: C. S. Prem
- Music by: Udhayan
- Production companies: Suji Pictures; Rathna Cinemas
- Release date: 7 September 2012
- Country: India
- Language: Tamil

Mannaru (transl. King) is a 2012 Indian Tamil-language drama film written and directed by S. Jai Shankar and starring Appukutty, Thambi Ramaiah, and Swathi.

== Cast ==
- Appukutty as Mannaru
- Thambi Ramaiah
- Swathi as Anjali
- Vaishali
- Naadodigal Gopal
- Thavasi
- Rama
- Scissor Manohar
- Pandiarajan (special appearance in a song)

== Soundtrack ==
The music was composed by Udhayan.

No.	Title	Singer(s)	Length
1.	"Dappa Dappa"	Kampadi Amali, Vaigai Kovith, Vaigai Selvi, Krishnaraj
2.	"Do Do Dubai"	Udhayan
3.	"Dubu Dubu Dubaayie"	Bavan
4.	"Ingu Ethvum Sariyila"	Velmurugan
5.	"Ooraiyellam Kaaval"	S. P. Sailaja, Krishnaraj

== Reception ==
A critic from The Times of India gave the film 2/5 and criticised the subplot and numerous flashbacks. A critic from News18 wrote that "The highlight is Jai Shankar's sincere attempt to stay away from the clich's. The film begins on a sweet note and proceeds the same way all through".

A critic from Sify wrote that "Once again Appukutty goes through the village simpleton act which he does with consummate ease, in a film which has no story or script". A critic from Maalai Malar praised the film, but called the concept old. A critic from Dinamalar called the film average, but praised Appukutty's performance.
