= PubGoa =

Indian virtual reality-based web series

- Genre: Sci-fi; Crime; Thriller
- Written by: Lakshmi Narayan Raju
- Directed by: Lakshmi Narayan Raju
- Country of origin: India
- Original language: Tamil
- No. of seasons: 1
- No. of episodes: 8

Production
- Production location: India
- Editor: Aswin Ignatious
- Running time: Approx. 26 minutes

Original release
- Network: ZEE5
- Release: 27 November 2020

PubGoa is an Indian Tamil-language virtual reality-based thriller web series that is streaming on ZEE5 platform from 27 November 2020. The 8-episodes web series is written and directed by Lakshmi Narayan Raju. It stars Vimala Raman, Dev Ramnath, Sampath Ram, Leo Sivadass, Ayra, Sarah Annaiah, and Abishek Joseph George.

== Synopsis ==
PubGoa has two different stories running parallelly, one story is of a female police (Vimala Raman) who is investigating a violence and bloodshed shootout that happened at a new year's rave party which was held in Goa. And, second story is of a man who somehow escapes from the shootout alive and he is searching for his lost girlfriend.

== Cast ==
- Vimala Raman as Aadhira
- Dev Ramnath as Varun
- Sampath Ram as Ayyanar
- Leo Sivadass as Vinothan
- Annaiah Sarah
- Ayra
- Ajay Melvin
- Gireesh Krish Nair
- Abhishek Joseph George
- Vetri Net
- Naveen Shankar

== Episodes list ==
| No. overall | No. in season | Title | Directed by | Written by | Original release date |
|---|---|---|---|---|---|
| 1 | 1 | "Sun, Beach, Drugs, and Crime" | Lakshmi Narayan Raju | Lakshmi Narayan Raju | 27 November 2020 |
Adira is taken on a guilt trip when the Siolim drug party case continues to haunt her. This case had a blend of rave party, shootout and a politician’s conspiracy. Will Kavya and Varun be able to help Adira go on the road to redemption?
| 2 | 2 | "Two Bullets, One Lie, and A Mask" | Lakshmi Narayan Raju | Lakshmi Narayan Raju | 27 November 2020 |
Adira is suspicious about everyone around as she has to believe in her instinct. Kavya and Varun are already haunted by their past. In between all this, a familiar stranger crosses Varun’s path and an unexpected guest arrives at Kavya’s place.
| 3 | 3 | "When Desperation turns Unlucky!" | Lakshmi Narayan Raju | Lakshmi Narayan Raju | 27 November 2020 |
Kavya is trying her best to move on from her past as it keeps appearing again and again. Varun, on the other hand, finds a key to open his memory vault. Meanwhile, Adira is desperate and gets closer to solve the puzzle, but she runs out of luck at the last minute.
| 4 | 4 | "Maya and Murphy's Law" | Lakshmi Narayan Raju | Lakshmi Narayan Raju | 27 November 2020 |
Adira tries her best deception tactics but the odds still stay against her. Kavya manages to escape from the clutches of death, and Hade follows her. Varun, on the other hand, is caught in a death trap when he tries to find Maya.
| 5 | 5 | "A Key to the Puzzle?" | Lakshmi Narayan Raju | Lakshmi Narayan Raju | 27 November 2020 |
Adira begins to solve one piece of the puzzle at the time, starting from Kavya. Meanwhile, Varun is trapped between the 4 walls and his lost memory. He finds and uses the secret key to open the memory vault. Adira catches the beast in her booby trap.
| 6 | 6 | "Love, Sex, and Games" | Lakshmi Narayan Raju | Lakshmi Narayan Raju | 27 November 2020 |
Varun opens the memory vault and realizes that Maya was more than a game for him. Adira manages to duck the bullet, but her target is spot on. The game starts to intensify, and the real players come to the front.
| 7 | 7 | "The Game Begins" | Lakshmi Narayan Raju | Lakshmi Narayan Raju | 27 November 2020 |
Varun learns and starts to play the game. Adira has put every puzzle piece in place and still cannot solve it. Maya, on the other hand, opens Pandora’s box of unpleasant memories for Varun.
| 8 | 8 | "Game Over" | Lakshmi Narayan Raju | Lakshmi Narayan Raju | 27 November 2020 |
The monster of the game comes out once again. Varun and Adira realize that they should play the game to survive and not to win. Will they be able to survive, or a new twist would ruin everything they did so far to survive?

== Reception ==
=== Critical reception ===
Pakaoo has given the web series 6/10 stars stating that "if you like the Sci-fi movies, can be watched once". Movie joins all the pieces together slowly and each character and situation reveal to the story. The narration gets little chaotic and predictable somewhere, call it as intended sometimes. Revealing or unfolding of the movie is very predictable at times, which is a weak point of movie. Connecting the subplots, investigation by cop, and suspense makes the movie watchable. Laxmi narayan direction is good and Cinematography by kartik thillai is good.

Binged Bureau of the Binged platform has given PubGoa a 5/10 stars rating stating that "One of the critical subplots is boringly executed for a long time. The other which is a proper thriller leads to a routine outcome". The other subplot throws a surprise and merging of both into a single incident is one of the best aspects of the series, story-wise. The web series is a passable thriller. The convoluted narrative and predictable end make it weaker. Give it a try if you love the genre and have lots of patience.
