= Satan – The Dark =

- Theatrical release poster
- Directed by: Manikandan Ramalingam
- Written by: Manikandan Ramalingam
- Produced by: Edward
- Starring: Fredrick John; Ayraa
- Cinematography: Bala G Ramasamy
- Edited by: Rajkumar; Kovai Abhishek
- Music by: Aswin Krishna
- Production company: EPS Pictures
- Release date: 27 March 2026
- Running time: 141 minutes
- Country: India
- Language: Tamil

Satan – The Dark is a 2026 Indian Tamil-language supernatural horror film written and directed by Manikandan Ramalingam, starring Fredrick John and Ayraa. The film, originally titled The Black Bible, was released on 27 March 2026.

== Premise ==
Asthinapuram is a village with a dark history of Satan worship and witchcraft. A woman named Marcelin becomes possessed by a malevolent force, exhibiting bloodthirsty and frightening behaviour. The film follows Marcelin's school-going daughter, Alisha, and classmate Sagar, who has a crush on her, navigating the aftermath and searching for a way to break the possession.

== Cast ==
- Fredrick John as Sagar
- Ayraa as Alisha
- Chandini Tamilarasan
- Sreeja Ravi
- Mona Bedre as Marcelin
- Edward

== Release and reception ==
The film was theatrically released on 27 March 2026. Abhinav Subramanian of The Times of India rated the film two out of five stars and wrote, "A tighter cut might have preserved whatever claustrophobic tension the setting generates. Instead, it stretches and defaults to the same gimmicky shocks until they stop registering". A critic from Maalai Malar gave the same rating and wrote that many things are unclear from the beginning, confusing the audience. A critic from Dinamalar wrote that the director has given the effects of Satan worship and given it a different story, but after the interval, he confuses it and drags out scenes without knowing how to end it, making the audience tense. A critic from Dina Thanthi wrote that although it is a typical storyline, director Manikandan Ramalingam has created a sense of horror with unique scenes that will keep you watching.
