= Chetpet Lake =

Lake in Chennai, India

Coordinates: 13.07412°N 80.24238°E

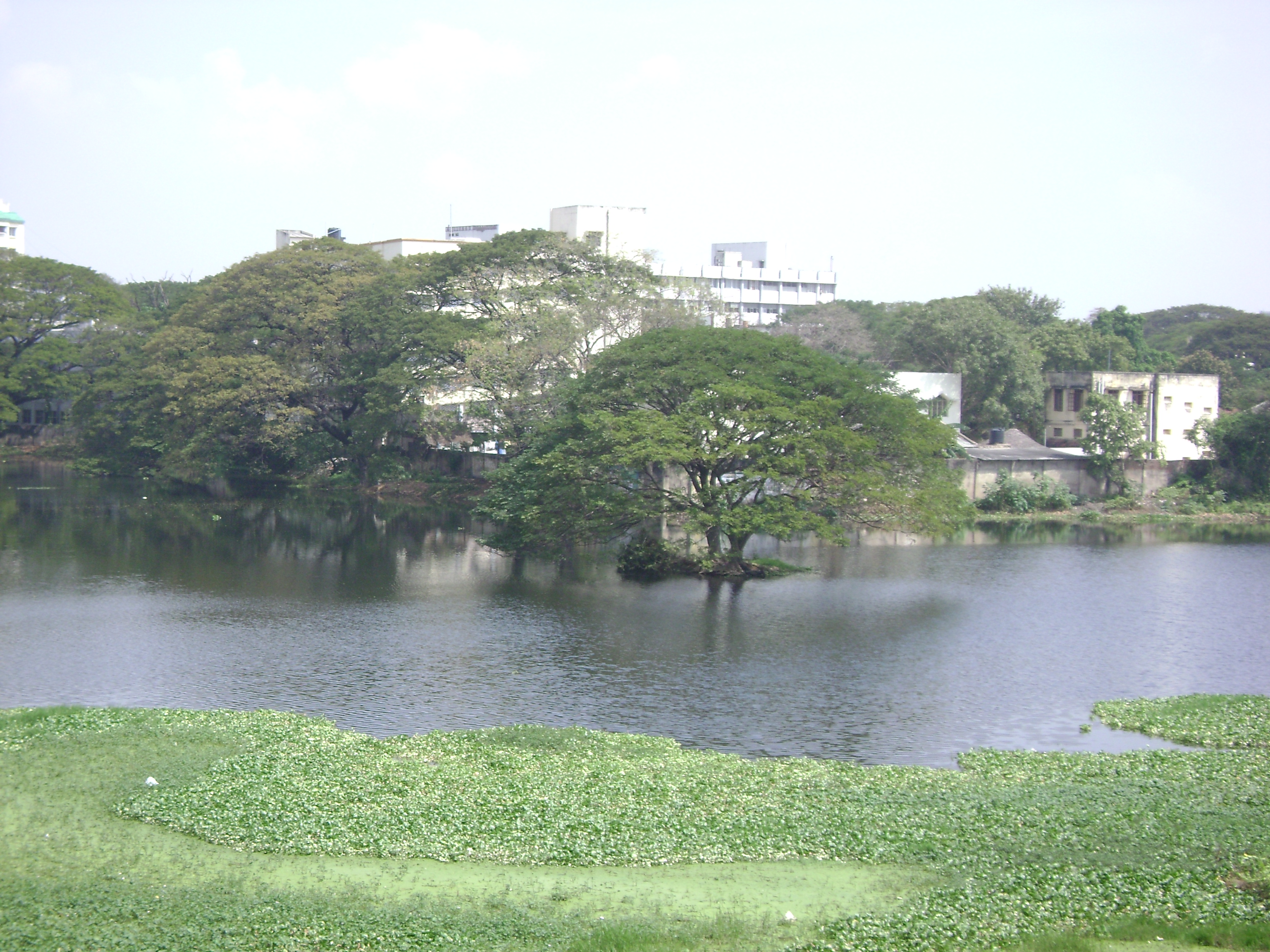
- Chetpet Lake in February 2008.

- Location within Chennai
- Location: Chetpet, Chennai, India
- Type: Pond
- Surface area: 16.1 acres (6.5 ha) (Angling pond: 3.10 acres; Boating pond: 6 acres)
- Islands: 1
- Settlements: Chennai

Chetpet Lake (Tamil: செத்துப்பட்டு ஏரி) is a lake spread over 16 acres in Chetpet, Chennai, India. It is located to the north of Chetpet railway station. It is the only existing lake at the centre of the city. The lake belongs to the Department of Fisheries of the Tamil Nadu government.

Of the total area of the lake, the waterbody is spread across 9.1 acres and the land area covers 6.9 acres. An anglers club was functioning till the 1940s in the lake, whose members visited the small island in the midst of the waterbody for fishing.

Although not used for drinking purposes, the lake was a source of groundwater recharge for the surrounding areas. As the water quality is not saline, the lake has a few varieties of fishes such as rohu, catla and mrigal. Breeding is monitored to assess the water quality.

== History ==
In 1934, the lake was taken over by the Department of Fisheries to conduct research. In the following decade, a hydro-biological research station was set up to conduct studies in fisheries. Fishing as a sporting activity began at the lake with the formation of Madras Anglers Club in 1962. In the dry summer months of 2019, about 4,500 cubic metres of silt was dredged. These were used to strengthen the bund.

== The lake today ==
In recent years, the lake has been heavily encroached upon, particularly near the Chetpet railway station. There have been many plans to rejuvenate Chetpet lake since the mid-1990s, including developing a boat club, an aquarium, seafood stall and fish court besides a walkway around the waterbody. The last attempt to save the lake was in 2005, when the state environment department identified it along with 12 other lakes of Greater Chennai area for an eco-restoration project. The CPR Environmental Education Centre conducted a detailed survey, and based on that, the state government appointed the Tamil Nadu Urban Infrastructure Finance Services Limited to prepare a project report. The State government had sanctioned ₹ 4 million to clean the overgrown water hyacinth and desilt the lake in 2007–2008.

== Developments ==
In May 2012, the Chennai Corporation Council adopted a resolution to construct a 1,475-m-long stormwater drain from the lake to the Cooum river at a cost of ₹ 22.9 million to carry excess water during monsoon. The drain would pass through New Bhoopathy Nagar, Pachaiyappa's College play ground and Venkatachalapathy Street. This is to prevent flooding in the Kilpauk Medical College area.

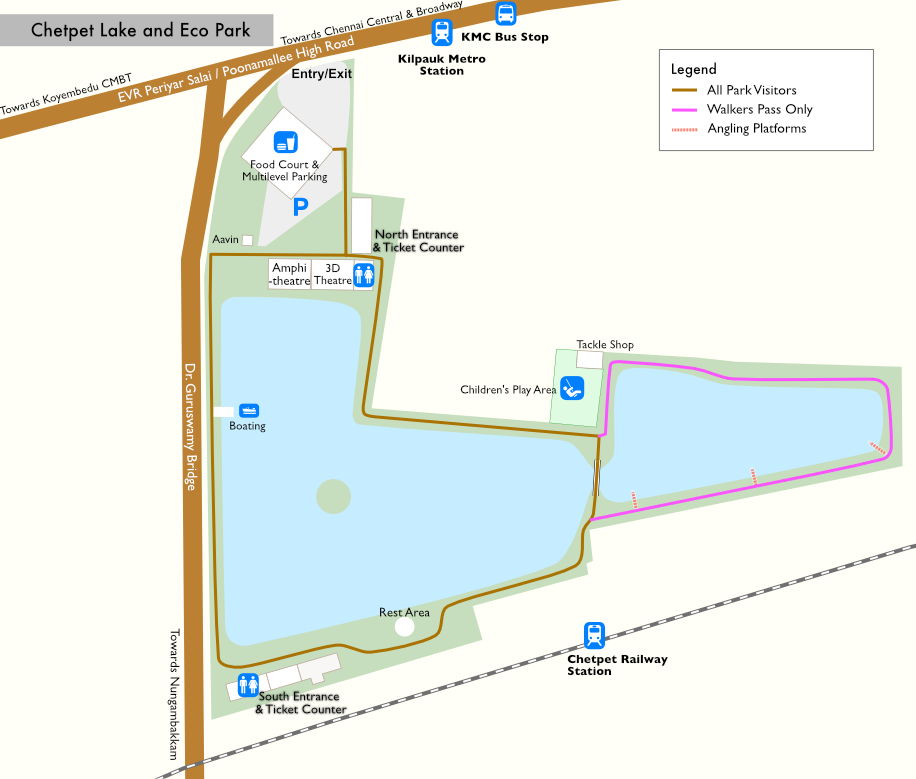
Map of Chetpet Lake and Eco Park

A building to house a stall of the Fisheries Development Corporation is also coming up by the side of the lake at a cost of ₹ 60 million. The three-storey building will comprise two fish heads, facing north and west, joined by a fin and a tail. The heads will be made of light-weight material. The building will accommodate the offices of the Tamil Nadu Fisheries Development Corporation, Tamil Nadu State Apex Fisheries Cooperative Federation and the chief engineer of the fisheries department.

In April 2013, Chief Minister J. Jayalalithaa announced developing the lake with facilities for angling, water sports, boating and open-air auditoriums at a cost of ₹ 420 million. The lake shore will have an eco park with 1.5-km long track for walkers and joggers and children's play area, in addition to a seafood restaurant and multilevel parking space to accommodate 200 cars. The eco-park is dotted with 30 stone sculptures. Other facilities include acupressure walkway, elevation aquarium, 3D film show, and a virtual reality centre on marine life. Parts of the project include an elevated link between Chetpet railway station and the eco park, infrastructure connecting Poonamallee High Road with the park, and construction of a box culvert beneath the railway tracks to connect the lake with Cooum River near Spur Tank Road. The park is being planned in a 15-acre area adjoining the lake. The foundation stone for the park was laid in June 2014.

== Gallery ==
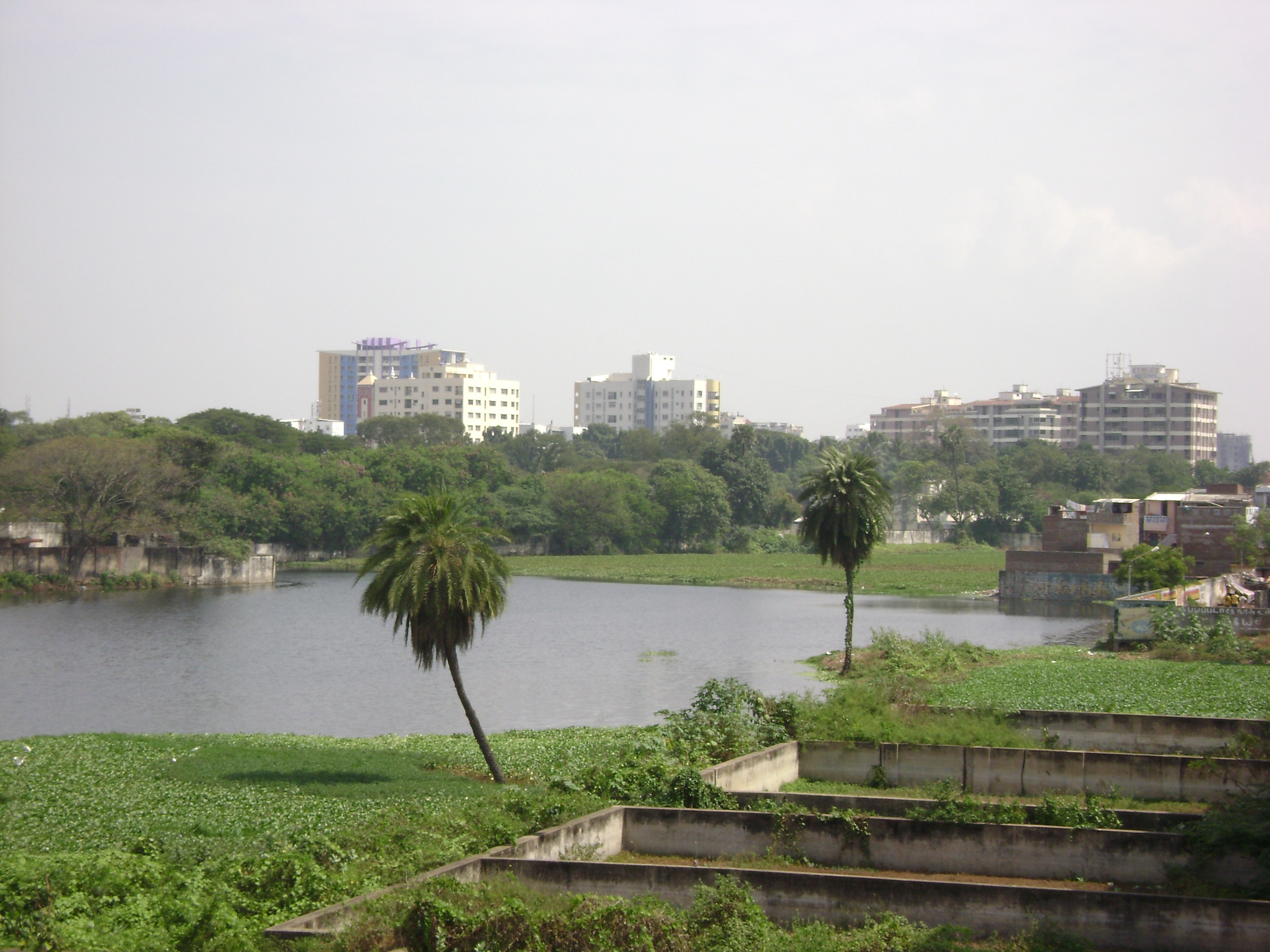
The lake on 16/02/2008

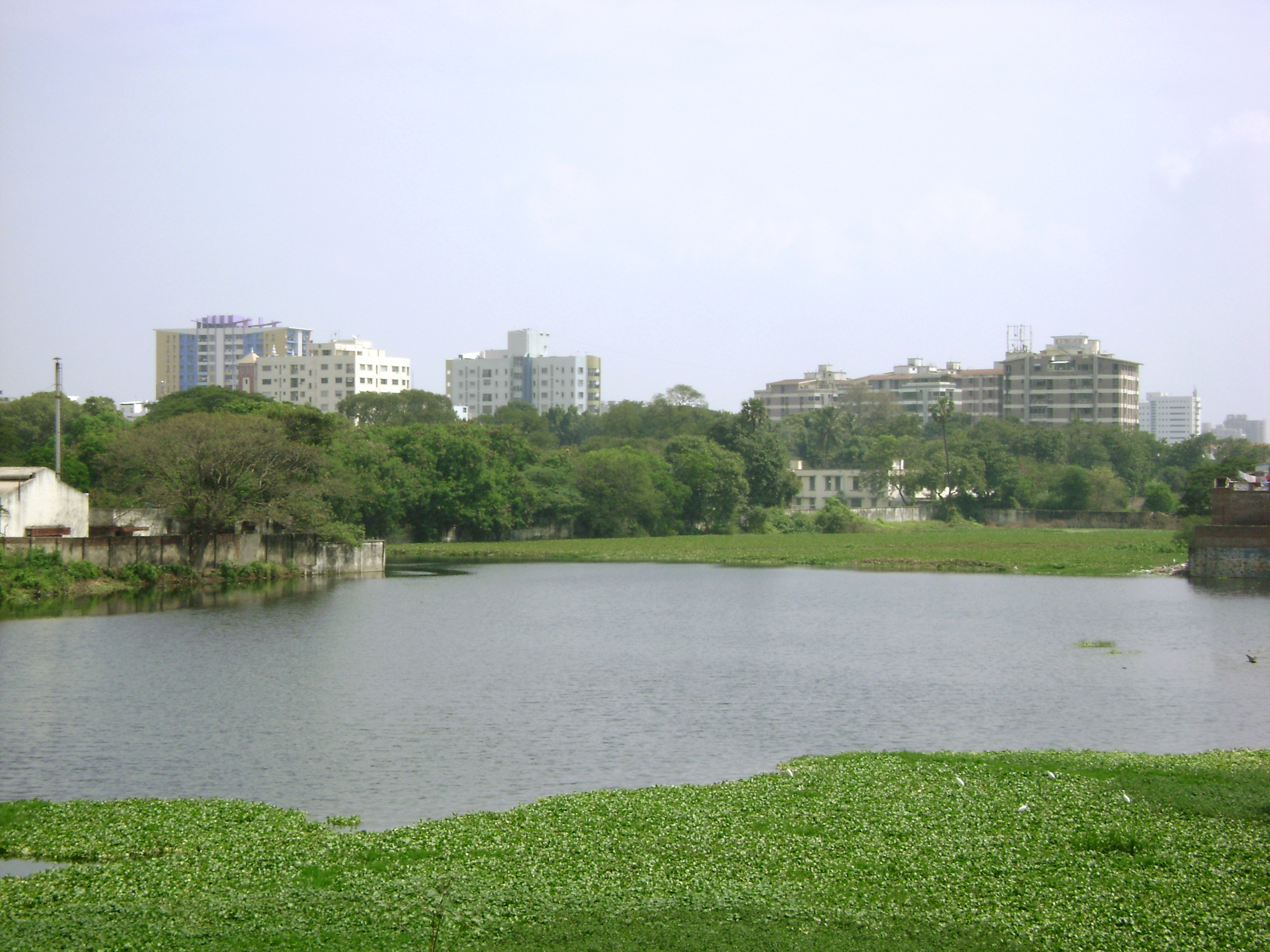
16/2/2008

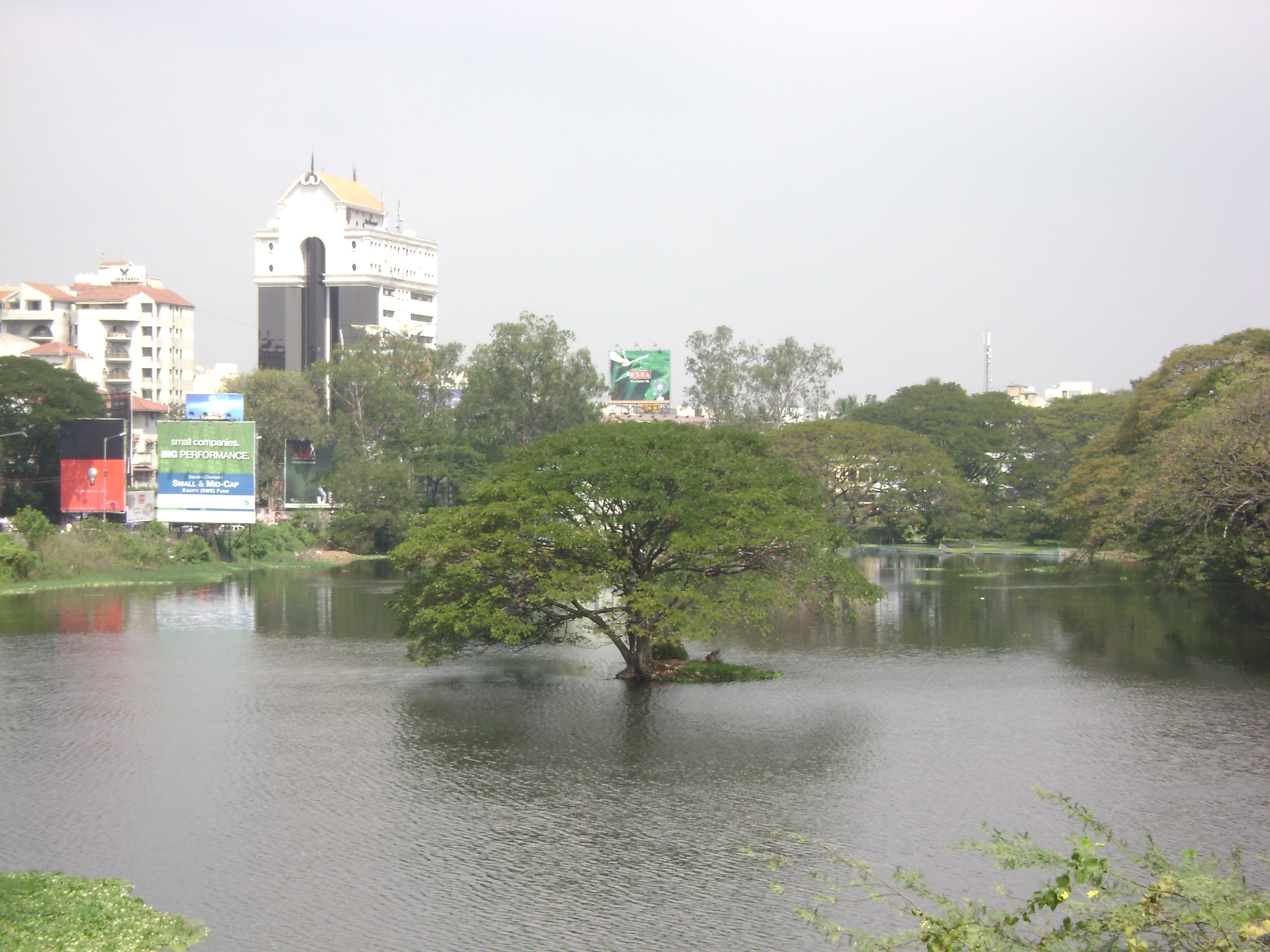
16/2/2008

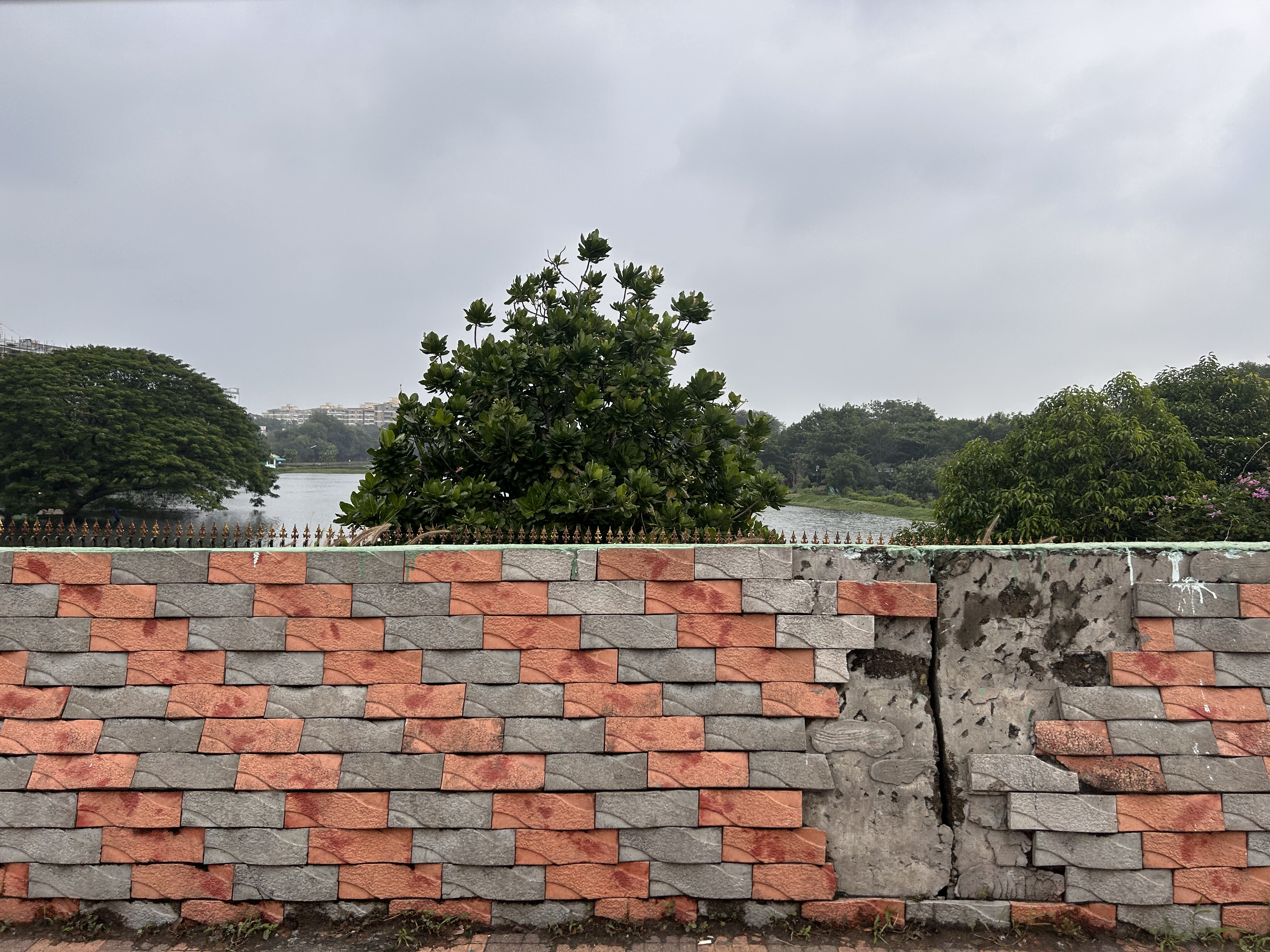
Chetpet Lake in 2024

== See also ==
- Water management in Chennai
