= Chennai Egmore–Tirunelveli Vande Bharat Express =

Vande Bharat Express train route in India

Chennai Egmore - Tirunelveli Junction Vande Bharat Express
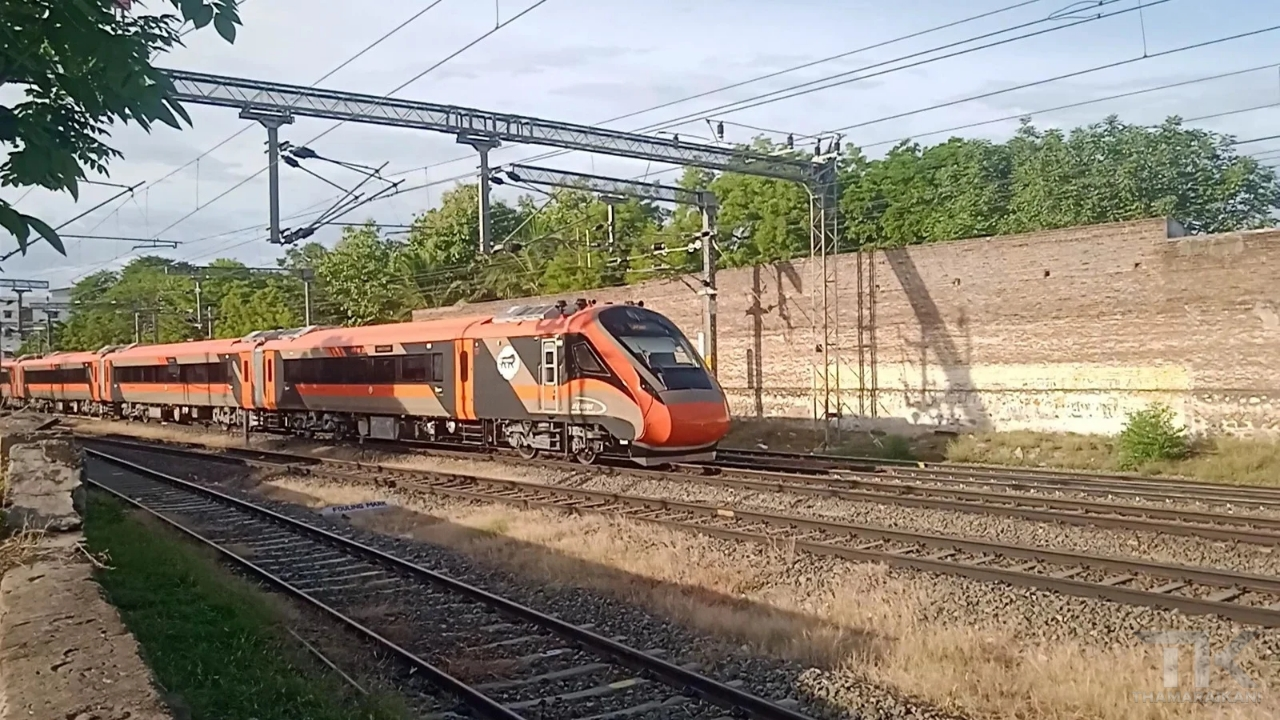
- Tirunelveli - Chennai Egmore Vande Bharat Express arriving Virudhunagar Junction

Overview
- Service type: Vande Bharat Express
- Locale: Tamil Nadu
- First service: September 24, 2023 (Inaugural run); 25 September 2023; 3 years ago (Commercial run)
- Current operator: Southern Railways (SR)

Route
- Termini: Chennai Egmore (MS); Tirunelveli Junction (TEN)
- Stops: 8
- Distance travelled: 650 km (404 mi)
- Average journey time: 07 hrs 50 mins
- Service frequency: Six days a week (Note: Except Tuesdays)
- Train number: 20665 / 20666
- Lines used: Chennai - Villupuram line Chord Line; Madurai–Tirunelveli line

On-board services
- Classes: AC Chair Car, AC Executive Chair Car
- Seating arrangements: Airline style; Rotatable seats
- Sleeping arrangements: No
- Catering facilities: E Catering services, On board Catering
- Observation facilities: Large windows in all coaches
- Entertainment facilities: On-board WiFi; Infotainment System; Electric outlets; Reading light; Seat Pockets; Bottle Holder; Tray Table
- Baggage facilities: Overhead racks
- Other facilities: Kavach

Technical
- Rolling stock: Mini Vande Bharat 2.0 (Last service: Jan 13 2025); Vande Bharat 2.0 (Last service: Sept 22 2025); Vande Bharat 3.0 (First service: Sept 24 2025)
- Track gauge: Indian gauge 1,676 mm (5 ft 6 in) broad gauge
- Electrification: 25 kV 50 Hz AC Overhead line
- Operating speed: 83 km/h (52 mph) (Avg.)
- Average length: 480 metres (1,570 ft) (20 coaches)
- Track owner: Indian Railways
- Rake maintenance: Tirunelveli Jn (TEN)

The 20665/20666 Chennai Egmore - Tirunelveli Vande Bharat Express (also known as Nellai Vande Bharat Express) is India's 28th Vande Bharat Express train, which is running across the state of Tamil Nadu connecting the city of Chennai with Tirunelveli. This train was inaugurated on 24 September 2023, by Prime Minister Narendra Modi via video conference from New Delhi.

== Overview ==
This train is operated by Indian Railways, which connects Chennai Egmore, Tambaram, Villuppuram Jn, Vriddhachalam Jn, Tiruchchirappalli Jn, Dindigul Jn, Madurai Jn, Virudhunagar Jn, Kovilpatti and Tirunelveli Jn. It is currently operated with train numbers 20665/20666 on 6 days a week basis.

== Rakes ==
It was the twenty-sixth 2nd Generation and fourteenth Mini Vande Bharat 2.0 Express train which was designed and manufactured by the Integral Coach Factory at Perambur, Chennai under the Make in India Initiative.

As per latest reports, Prabhakar Gunaseelapandian, Deputy Chief Operating Manager (COM), Southern Railways issued a statement that the current running rake would be converted to 16-car rake as this would benefit the passengers heading towards the city of Tirunelveli and other key stations like Tiruchirappalli, Dindigul, Madurai & Virudhunagar. The conversion of 8 coaches to 16 coaches commenced on January 15, 2025, right after the Tamil Nadu's harvest festival, Pongal.

=== Coach augmentation ===
As per new fresh updates on September 16, 2025, Southern Railways announced that this express train will be further augmented with 4 additional AC coaches, starting from September 24, 2025, on its 2nd birthday anniversary it will run with a new Vande Bharat 3.0 trainset, in response to long-standing passenger demand for additional capacity on this busy Tirunelveli–Chennai route.

== Service ==
The 20665/20666 Chennai Egmore - Tirunelveli Jn Vande Bharat Express operates six days a week except Tuesdays, covering a distance of 650 km (400 mi) in a travel time of 7 hours 50 mins with an average speed of 84 km/h (52 mph). The service has 8 intermediate stops. The Maximum Permissible Speed is 110 km/h (68 mph).

== Gallery ==
Some of the pictures of this express train shown below:-

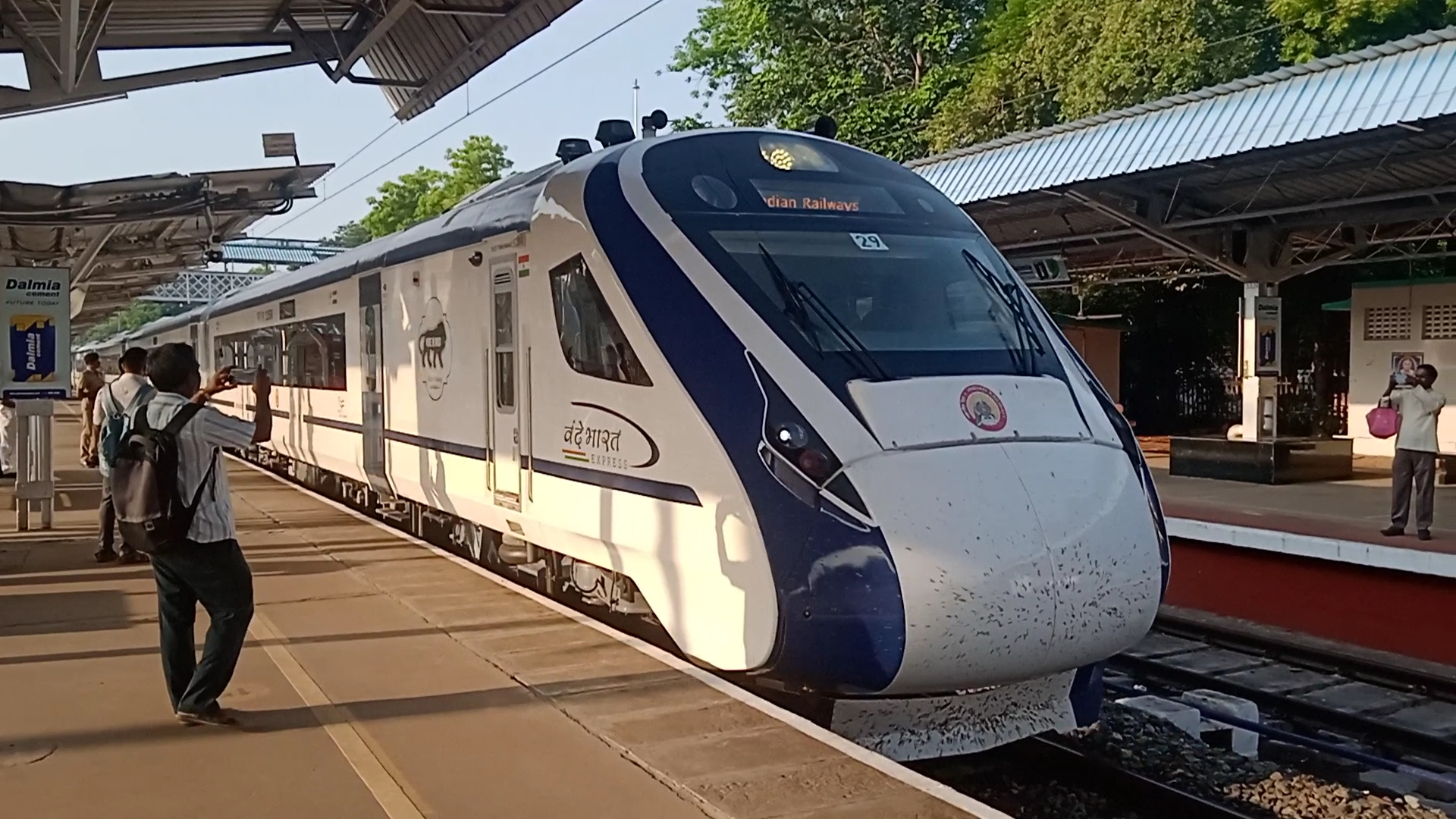
Tirunelveli - Chennai Egmore Vande Bharat Express depart Virudhunagar Junction on its trial run September 22, 2023

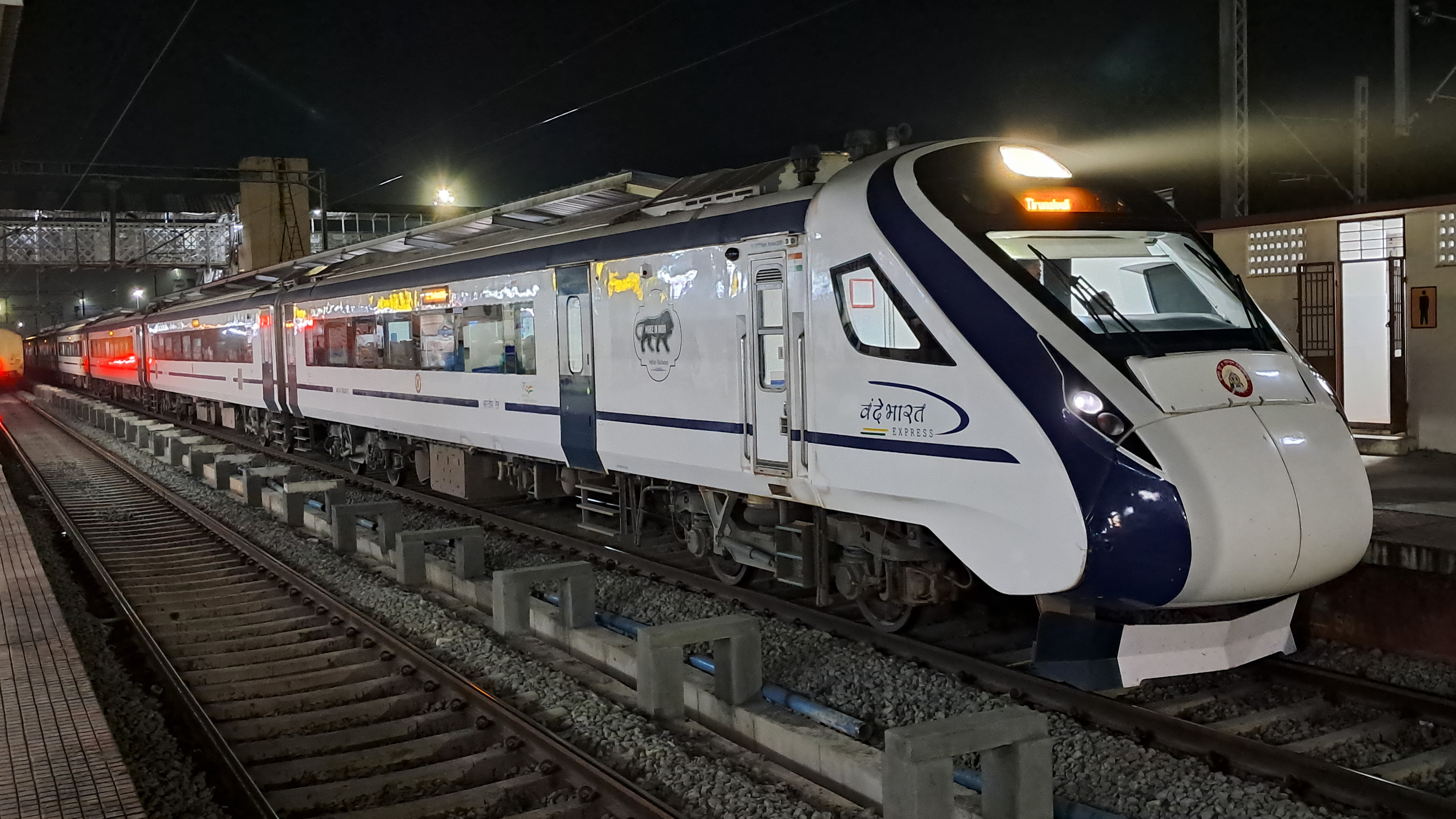
Nellai Vande Bharat Express arriving at Dindigul Junction

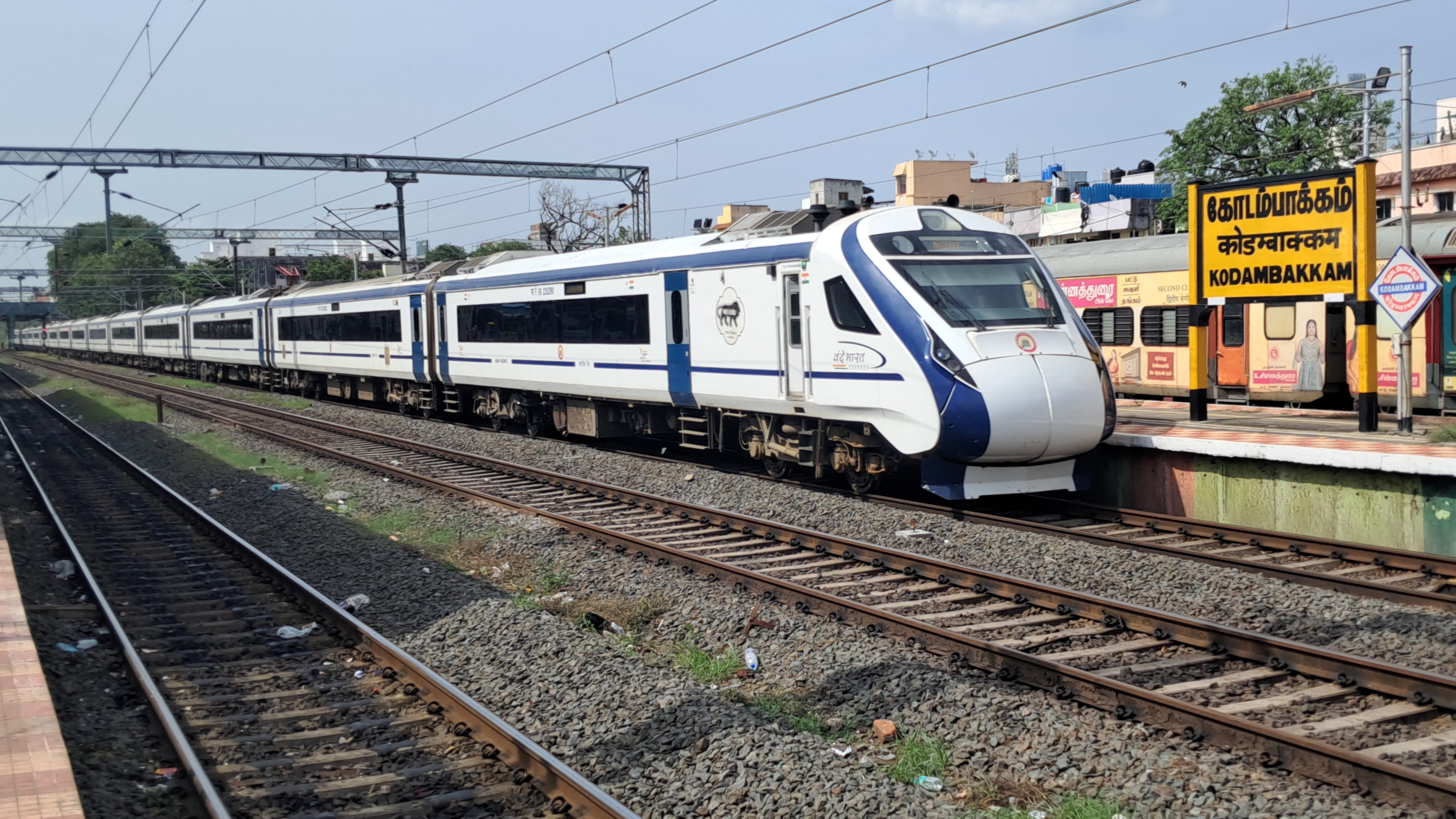
Formerly running 16 coach VB express train skipping Kodambakkam

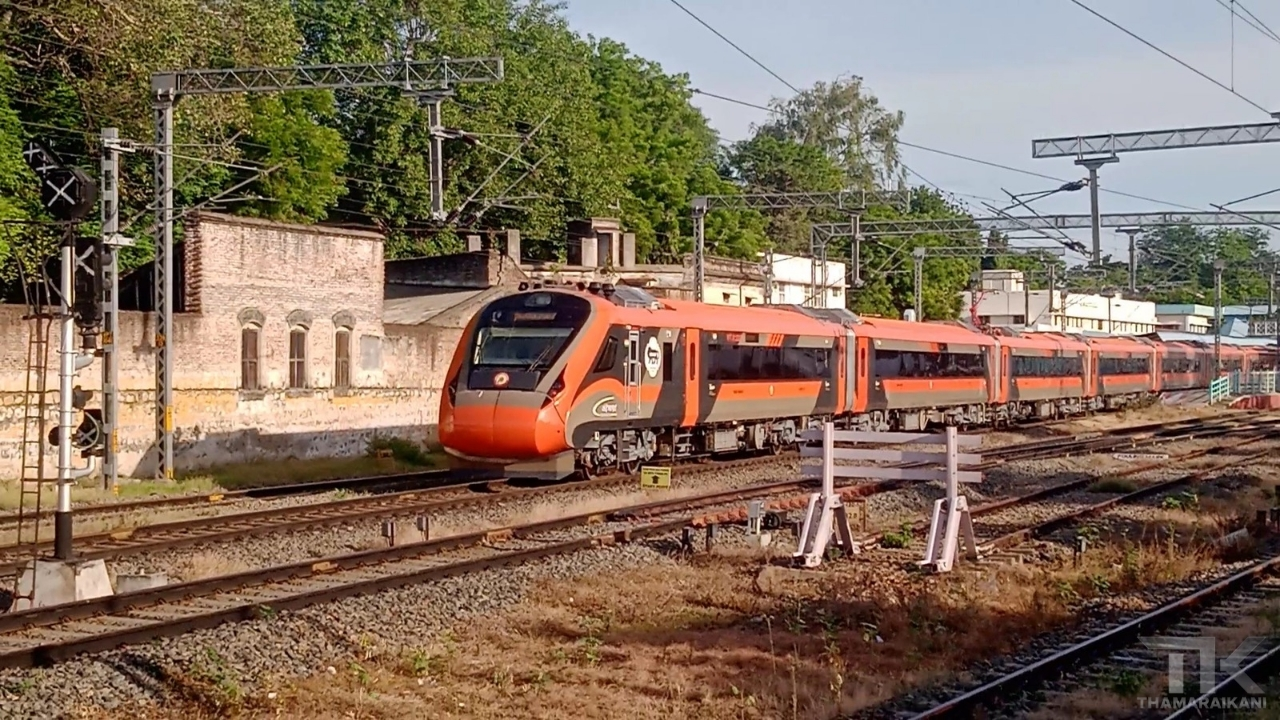
New 20 car Saffron Vande Bharat Express arrive Virudhunagar Junction

== Incidents ==
On 4 February 2024, glass windows in six coaches suffered damage when it almost reached Naraikinaru railway station around 10:08 PM, as unidentified culprits pelted stones at the speeding train at night. No casualties were reported during this incident.

On 7 December 2024, the 4 coaches from C4 to C7 of Tirunelveli Vande Bharat Express did not open the closed automated doors at Dindigul Junction railway station and the train departed. After some time, the train was made to stop at Kodaikanal Road railway station for an unscheduled halt and passengers to Dindigul were sent there by Mysuru–Tuticorin Express. The railways said it is the mistake of the guard who forgot to open doors of all coaches, as that was the first time he was having duty in Vande Bharat Express and he boarded after crew change at Tiruchirapalli Junction.

== See also ==
- Vande Bharat Express
- Tejas Express
- Gatimaan Express
- Chennai Egmore railway station
- Tirunelveli Junction railway station
