= Pachai Engira Kaathu =

2012 Indian film by Keera

- Directed by: Keera
- Produced by: Ashok
- Starring: Vaasagar; Devathai; Dhruvan
- Music by: Hari Babu
- Release date: 13 April 2012
- Country: India
- Language: Tamil

Pachai Engira Kaathu (transl. Wait for green) is a 2012 Indian Tamil-language film directed by newcomer Keera and starring Vaasagar, Devathai, and Dhruvan. Much of the cast are newcomers.

== Cast ==
- Vaasagar as Pachai
- Devathai as Tamilselvi
- Dhruvan as Navhaath
- Mura
- Appukutty
- Saravanan

== Release and reception ==
A critic from Sify gave the film a verdict of violent and stated that "Overall, the film is a brave attempt to realistically portray how a man is betrayed not only by people close to him, but by his own past which catches up with him, proving that violence only begets more violence". A critic from The Times of India gave the film a rating of one-and-a-half out five stars and noted that "While it is okay to have normal-looking people as the main actors, one would expect them to carry the film with their performances, which sadly isn’t the case here". A critic from The New Indian Express wrote that "Small budgeted with no big names to boast of, the film despite its flaws is refreshing, and a promising effort from a debutant filmmaker". A critic from Dinamalar praised the first half of the film and the music while criticizing the film's climax. A critic from Vikatan praised the cinematography and music of the film while criticizing the second half of the film. The film was not successful at the box office.
