= Merlin (2018 film) =

- Theatrical release poster
- Directed by: Keera
- Produced by: J. S. B. Sathish Kumar
- Starring: Vishnupriyan; Ashwini Chandrashekar; Lollu Sabha Jeeva
- Cinematography: Muthukumaran
- Edited by: Samuel
- Music by: Ganesh Raghavendra
- Production company: JSB Film Studios
- Release date: 23 February 2018
- Country: India
- Language: Tamil

Merlin is a 2018 Indian Tamil-language horror film written and directed by Keera. The film features Vishnupriyan and Ashwini Chandrashekar in the lead roles, while Jeeva, Singampuli and Aadukalam Murugadoss play other pivotal roles. Featuring music by Ganesh Raghavendra, the venture began production in early 2016 and was released on 23 February 2018.

== Cast ==
- Vishnupriyan as Vetri
- Ashwini Chandrasekhar as Merlin
- Lollu Sabha Jeeva
- Aadukalam Murugadoss
- Singampuli
- Powerstar Srinivasan
- Manobala
- Ramachandran Durairaj
- Thangar Bachan
- Dinesh as himself (guest appearance)

Special appearances in the song "Ain't No Sunshine" in order of appearance

- Chaams
- Guru Somasundaram
- Ma Ka Pa Anand
- Shakthi Vasudevan
- Priyamani
- Aadhi
- Vimal
- Vijay Sethupathi
- Aadukalam Naren

== Soundtrack ==
The film's music was composed by Ganesh Raghavendra. The soundtrack was released on 28 June 2017 through TrendMusic. A version of the English song "Ain't No Sunshine" by Bill Withers from his 1971 album Just As I Am was included in the soundtrack of Merlin, with Aadukalam Murugadoss rendering the version. The song was used as a promotional track for the film, with actors such as Chaams, Aadukalam Naren, Aadhi, Vemal, Guru Somasundaram, Ma Ka Pa Anand, Shakthi Vasu, Priyamani and Vijay Sethupathi appearing in the making video.

Track listing
No.	Title	Lyrics	Singer(s)	Length
1.	"Onna Jaal"	Keera	Guru	2:38
2.	"Vandhanam Vandhanam"	Ku. Karthick	Marana Gana Viji	4:38
3.	"Aagaya Nilave"	Yugabharathi	Saindhavi	4:14
4.	"Neerum Neruppum"	Saavee	Ganesh Raghavendra, Priyanka	4:12
5.	"Ain't No Sunshine"	Bill Withers, Keera	Aadukalam Murugadoss	3:23
Total length:				19:05

== Critical reception ==
Navein Darshan of Cinema Express felt that film lacked realism and the editing is completely abrupt. Dina Thanthi reviewed the film more positively, praising the cinematography and music.

== Controversy ==
Praveena Charumathi Sampathkumar filed a case and sought to stop the film from being screened as she felt that film contains dialogue which degrades women.
