= Nungambakkam railway station =

Railway station in Chennai, India

Nungambakkam
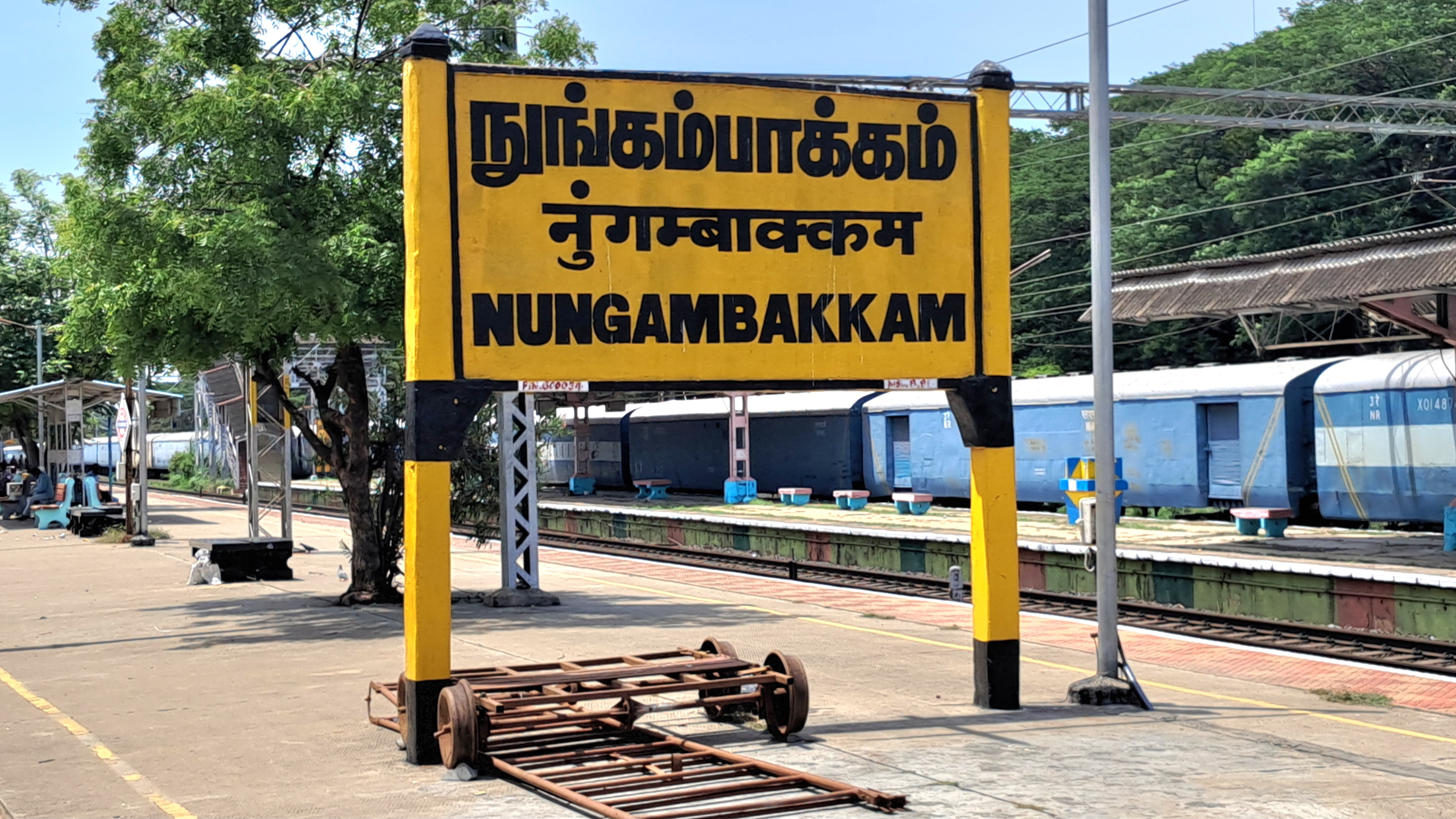
- Nungambakkam railway station as of June 2025

General information
- Location: Station View Road, Tiruvenkatapuram, Choolaimedu, Chennai, Tamil Nadu, India
- Coordinates: 13.065363°N 80.232742°E
- System: Indian Railways and Chennai Suburban Railway station
- Owner: Ministry of Railways, Indian Railways
- Lines: South and South West lines of Chennai Suburban Railway
- Platforms: 4
- Tracks: 4

Construction
- Structure type: Standard on-ground station
- Parking: Available

Other information
- Station code: NBK
- Fare zone: Southern Railways

History
- Opened: Early 1900s
- Electrified: 1931
- Former names: South Indian Railway

Services
Preceding station	Chennai Suburban	Following station
Chetpet towards Chennai Beach	South Line	Kodambakkam towards Tambaram, Chengalpattu Junction or Villupuram Junction
Route map
Chennai Beach — Villupuram
Location

Nungambakkam Railway Station is one of the railway stations of the Chennai Beach–Chengalpattu section of the Chennai Suburban Railway Network. It serves the neighbourhood of Nungambakkam, a suburb of Chennai. It is located at about 8 km from Chennai Beach terminus and is situated at Nungambakkam, with an elevation of 11 m above sea level.

== History ==
Nungambakkam railway station was constructed when the electric suburban railway service was laid between 1928 and 1931. Before 1923, the stretch between Chetpet and Kodambakkam stations was covered by the Nungambakkam Tank. The section was converted to 25 kV AC traction on 15 January 1967.

== Safety issues ==
Despite being one of the busier railway stations within downtown Chennai, the station lacked many safety factors, including lack of a closed-circuit television camera. The murder of Swathy, a 24-year-old computer engineer who was hacked to death by a then unidentified young man in the station premises on the morning of 24 June 2016 in full daylight, received wide media attention and publicity, leading to the public outcry on the safety levels at all suburban stations.

== The station ==
=== Platforms ===
There are a total of 4 platforms and 4 tracks. The platforms are connected by foot overbridge. These platforms are built to accumulate 24 coaches express train. The platforms are equipped with modern facility like display board of arrival and departure of trains.

=== Station layout ===
G	Street level	Exit/Entrance & ticket counter
P1	FOB, Side platform | Doors will open on the left
P1	Platform 1	Towards → Chennai Beach; Next Station: Chetpet
P1	FOB, Island platform | P1 Doors will open on the left/right | P2 Doors will open on the right
P1	Platform 2	Towards ← Tambaram / Chengalpattu Jn / Villuppuram Jn; Next Station: Kodambakkam
P1	Platform 3	Towards → Chennai Egmore
P1	FOB, Island platform | P3 and P4 | (Express Line)
P1	Platform 4	Towards ← Chengalpattu Junction
P1

== See also ==
- Chennai Suburban Railway
- Railway stations in Chennai
