= Swathi murder case =

Murder case in Tamil Nadu, India

S. Swathi was a 24-year-old Indian Infosys employee who was murdered on June 24, 2016, at the Nungambakkam railway station in Chennai, Tamil Nadu, India while on her way to her office. Swathi was murdered in front of several people, with passengers remaining mute spectators. The assailant, P. Ramkumar, escaped, and Swathi's body lay unattended before the police arrived and an investigation started.

== Victim ==
S. Swathi
- Born: 1991 or 1992
- Died: June 24, 2016 (aged 24); Chennai, India
- Cause of death: Homicide by stabbing
- Education: Dhanalakshmi College of Engineering (BS)

Swathi was the daughter of Santhana Gopalakrishnan, a retired employee of ESIC, the health insurance company of the Indian government. She completed a bachelor's degree in computer science at Dhanalakshmi College of Engineering in 2014, taking a course in Oracle in Anna University the same year. After being selected for a job at Infosys, she underwent training in Mysore and received a job as a System Engineer. Sidhu, a friend of Swathi from the engineering college, described her as a friendly woman who generally kept to herself.

== Murder ==
At around 6:30 am IST on June 24, 2016, Swathi's father dropped her off at the Nungambakkam railway station in Chennai. As part of her daily routine, Swathi was waiting at the station to travel to her workplace in Mahindra World City. She was stabbed to death with a sickle following an argument with a man who had been waiting for her approximately 30 minutes beforehand. The attacker fled at around 6:42 am. Initially, the railway police who discovered her body covered it with shirts purchased from nearby stores, and her body was left in such a position for more than two hours. A senior officer later reached the station and delivered the body to the Government General Hospital.

== Suspect ==
P. Ramkumar
- Born: 1991 or 1992; Meenakshipuram, Tirunelveli district, Tamil Nadu, India
- Died: September 18, 2016 (aged 24–25); Puzhal Central Prison, Chennai, India
- Cause of death: Suicide by self electrocution

P. Ramkumar was born in Meenakshipuram, a small village in the Tirunelveli district of Tamil Nadu. His father, Paramasivam, was an employee of the telecommunications company BSNL, and his mother, Pushpam, was an agricultural worker. Ramkumar finished his schooling in 2011, and received a degree in mechanical engineering in 2015, though he found it difficult to find employment. Ramkumar and Swathi were Facebook friends, and they had previously exchanged phone numbers, as per police records. A police officer stated that Ramkumar had stalked Swathi on Facebook, and monitored her movements offline. Seeking employment in the film industry and an opportunity to be closer to Swathi, he took up residence in Choolaimedu, a locality of Chennai. Acquaintances characterized Ramkumar as largely solitary; some residents of Meenakshipuram said he was "friendless". On July 1, 2016, Ramkumar was arrested for the murder in Tirunelveli. On September 18, 2016, Ramkumar, allegedly committed suicide by electrocuting himself in his cell at the Puzhal central prison in Chennai. Police have claimed that the accused died after biting a live electric wire.

== Investigation ==
The Madras High Court said it would intervene if the investigation proved lax, condemning the slowness of railway police in attending to the body. The case was quickly transferred from railway to city police after little progress was made. On July 1, 2016, Ramkumar was arrested for the murder in Tirunelveli. He allegedly attempted to commit suicide by slitting his throat, and was transferred to the government hospital of Tirunelveli A friend of Swathi, Bilal Malik, has also been taken in for questioning by the police.

On 18 September 2016, while the investigation was ongoing, Ramkumar allegedly committed suicide while lodged in central prison. He was taken to hospital after he bit a live wire, where he was declared dead. In July 2022, Caravan magazine published a status check on the case including detailed interviews with multiple people exploring unanswered questions.

== Controversy ==
N. Panchapakesan, founder of Chennai Sai Sankara Matrimonials, authored a blog highlighting the Swathi murder case and made several remarks including calling men from other castes "loafers" who were attempting to bracket Brahmin girls for their "Higher Genetics" and being born a Brahmin is a rarity with inter-caste Marriages being a "Himalayan blunder". The blog was subsequently removed after widespread social media outrage and criticism by the press.

== In popular culture ==
In 2017, Ramesh Selvan directed a film Swathi Kolai Vazhakku based on the incident, but due to legal hurdles later, the film's title was changed to Nungambakkam and was released in October 2020.
