= Raangi =

2022 action thriller film

- Theatrical release poster
- Directed by: M. Saravanan
- Screenplay by: M. Saravanan
- Story by: A. R. Murugadoss
- Produced by: Allirajah Subaskaran
- Starring: Trisha; Bekzod Abdumalikov; Anaswara Rajan
- Cinematography: K. A. Sakthivel
- Edited by: M. Subarak
- Music by: C. Sathya
- Production company: Lyca Productions
- Distributed by: Lyca Productions
- Release date: 30 December 2022
- Running time: 121 minutes
- Country: India
- Language: Tamil

Raangi (transl. Headstrong) is a 2022 Indian Tamil-language action thriller film directed by M. Saravanan and produced by Allirajah Subaskaran under the banner of Lyca Productions. The film stars Trisha, Bekzod Abdumalikov and Anaswara Rajan (in her Tamil debut) in the lead roles. The film's music was composed by C Sathya, while cinematography and editing were handled by K. A. Sakthivel and M Subarak, respectively. The film was released theatrically on 30 December 2022.

== Plot ==
Investigative journalist Thaiyal Nayagi discovers a fake facebook account with her niece Sushmitha's name and photo. She finds the creator of the fake account who is a girl who is Sushmitha's classmate, and insecure of her body, that girl was using Sushmitha's face to lure men and chat to them, often sending her body's semi-nude videos to them. Thaiyal counsels the girl out of her insecurity, warns the men who chatted in the fake account, and the issue is seemingly resolved. But Thaiyal finds out that one among the men who chatted with the fake account was a 17-year old rebel from Libya who was part of a terrorist outfit. To get news out of that boy, Thaiyal retains the fake account and pretends to be friendly to him under the guise of Sushmitha. Eventually, the 17-yr old boy Aalim falls in love with Sushmitha without knowing that Thaiyal is behind the chatting. Once, Aalim sends a photo in which Thaiyal sees an Indian Minister chatting with Libyan terrorists. Thaiyal releases that photo in her online news platform leading to Aalim being almost killed by his boss for leaking information. It also leads to Indian agencies killing that Minister, and Indian Intelligence agencies getting hold of Thaiyal. Meanwhile, Aalim comes to Chennai to see Sushmitha, almost reaching her school, but luckily for Sushmitha, Thaiyal forces him to leave. When Indian Intelligence agencies extract all this information from Thaiyal, they arrange Aalim to meet Sushmitha at Libya so that Aalim's terrorist outfit can be killed. Thaiyal, at the order of the intelligence agencies, has to go with them taking Sushmitha along, to the war-torn dangerous Libya. In confrontations that almost killed Sushmitha, Aalim dies in Sushmitha's lap after saving her life, without ever knowing that it wasn't Sushmitha, it was her aunt Thaiyal who had been chatting with him. Thaiyal finally mourns Aalim's death while an innocent Sushmitha looks in bewilderment.

Basically it is a story where a journalist in her late 30s irresponsibly catfishes a 17-yr old boy from Libya with her own schoolgoing niece's photo, causing the poor 17-yr old boy to fall in love and finally lose his life in vain, and causing her own niece the danger of being caught amidst a bloody civil war in Libya.

== Cast ==
- Trisha as Thaiyal Nayagi (Voice dubbed by Raveena Ravi)
- Bekzod Abdumalikov as Aalim
- Anaswara Rajan as Sushmitha
- Lizzie Antony as Priya, Sushmitha's mother
- John Mahendran as Police Inspector Krishnamurthy
- Gopi Kannadasan
- Waqar Khan

== Production ==
The film was tentatively titled as Trisha61. On 20 April 2019, the title was announced to be Raangi. The shooting of the film was wrapped up on 12 February 2020.

== Music ==
The music of the film is composed by C. Sathya, which marks his third collaboration with M. Saravanan after Engaeyum Eppothum and Ivan Veramathiri. The first single titled "Panithuli" was released on 15 December 2020.

Raangi

Soundtrack album by C. Sathya
- Released: 2022
- Genre: Feature film soundtrack
- Length: 7:19
- Language: Tamil
- Label: Lyca Music
- Producer: C. Sathya

C. Sathya chronology
| Theal (2022) | Raangi (2022) | Naadu (2023) |

Track listing
| No. | Title | Lyrics | Singer(s) | Length |
|---|---|---|---|---|
| 1. | "Panithuli" | Kabilan | Chinmayi Sripaada, C. Sathya, Yazin Nizar | 4:06 |
| 2. | "Raangikaari" | Viveka | Nikhita Gandhi, El Fe | 3:13 |
| Total length: | | | | 7:19 |

== Release ==
=== Theatrical ===
The film was released theatrically on 30 December 2022 alongside Kovai Sarala’s Sembi. Initially planned for a theatrical release, this was later cancelled in favour of a digital release due to the COVID-19 pandemic although the plans for the digital release was later dropped.

=== Home media ===
The post-theatrical streaming rights of the film were sold to Sun NXT and Netflix. The film had its digital premiere on the streaming platform from 29 January 2023.

== Reception ==
The film received mixed reviews from critics.

A critic for India Herald wrote "Unexpectedly fantastic, Raangi is the ideal weekend action thriller". Logesh Balachandran of The Times of India gave the film 3.5 out of 5 stars and wrote "Raangi is unexpectedly great and it's a perfect action thriller for the weekend". Janani K of India Today gave the film 2 out of 5 stars and wrote "Trisha has given a decent performance as Thaiyal Nayagi, but it is baffling to see how she agreed to go by so many problematic ideas". Yuva Nandini of ABP Live 3.5 out of 5 stars and wrote "Overall, Rangi is not only entertaining but also thought provoking". A critic for Cinema Vikatan wrote "C. Satya's music is unimpressive; The background music is also average". P. Sangeetha of OTT Play gave the film 2.5 out of 5 stars and wrote "Watch it only for Trisha's performance". Stalin Navaneethakrishnan of Hindustan Times wrote "If you want to watch a sensational film, then you can go for watching Raangi". Khalillulah of Hindu Tamil Thisai wrote "Apart from that, the inadequacy of the scenes to do justice to the soul of the story is felt towards the end". Sakshi Post gave the film 3.5 out of 5 stars and wrote "Put this action thriller on your watchlist." Kirubhakar Purushothaman of The Indian Express gave the film 1 out of 5 stars and wrote "It’s unfortunate that after a great comeback as Kundhavai in Ponniyin Selvan this year, Trisha ends 2022 on such a low note". Avinash Ramachandran of Cinema Express rated the film 1.5 out of 5, and wrote, "Constant oscillation between insensitivity and wokeness simply magnifies the problematic parts of the narrative".
