= Naadu =

- Theatrical release poster
- Directed by: M. Saravanan
- Starring: Tharshan; Mahima Nambiar
- Cinematography: K. A. Sakthivel
- Music by: C. Sathya
- Production companies: Sri Arch Media and Entertainment
- Release date: 1 December 2023
- Running time: 127 mins
- Country: India
- Language: Tamil

Naadu (transl. Country) is a 2023 Indian Tamil-language drama film written and directed by M. Saravanan. Produced by Narayanan Sri Arch Media and Entertainment, the film stars Tharshan and Mahima Nambiar in the lead roles. The music was composed by C. Sathya with cinematography by K. A. Sakthivel. The film was released theatrically on 1 December 2023.

== Cast ==
- Tharshan as Maari
- Mahima Nambiar as Dr. Shobana
- R. S. Shivaji in dual roles as Maari’s father and Maari's uncle
- Singampuli
- Aruldoss
- Inba Ravikumar as Yogi
- Vasantha

== Production ==
Prior to the start of production, the team engaged in a 35-day acting workshop. The film was shot throughout 2022, and Saravanan balanced post-production work on Raangi (2022), with making Naadu. It became the first film to be shot at the Kollimalai mountain range.

== Soundtrack ==
The soundtrack was composed by C. Sathya in his fourth collaboration with Saravanan after Engaeyum Eppothum, Ivan Veramathiri, and Raangi.

Naadu

Soundtrack album by C. Sathya
- Released: 2023
- Genre: Feature film soundtrack
- Length: 17:13
- Language: Tamil
- Label: Think Music
- Producer: C. Sathya

C. Sathya chronology
Raangi (2022)	Naadu (2023)	Hit List (2024)

Track listing
No.	Title	Lyrics	Singer(s)	Length
1.	"Yelelaai"	Thozhan	Suganthi	3:45
2.	"Malainaatile"	Karthik Netha	Ananthu	3:26
3.	"Dull Aavaadha"	Viveka	Sneha, Irfan Hyder, Vaimu	3:12
4.	"Maavilai Maavilai Thorananga"	Viveka	Anthony Daasan	3:48
5.	"Vandhanam Vandhanam"	M. Saravanan	Gold Devaraj, Muthu Sirpy, Nehru Samidurai, Puratchi Mani	3:02
Total length:				17:13

== Release and reception ==
The film had a theatrical release on 1 December 2023 across Tamil Nadu. A reviewer from Times Now noted the film was sure to make the audience "question both your service to your nation and your sense of humanity". A critic from Cinema Express wrote "the melodrama in Naadu is insufferably overstated and all for a story that is flat and pretty straightforward" and that "Naadu might have its heart in the right place but the heart pumps gallons of tears instead of blood".
