= Dhoolpet Police Station =

- Genre: Police procedural Crime thriller
- Written by: Brahma G Dev
- Screenplay by: Brahma G Dev
- Directed by: Jeshwini
- Starring: Ashwin Kumar Lakshmikanthan; Guru Lakshmanan; Padine Kumar; Sreethu Krishnan; Preethi Sharma
- Composer: Ashwath
- Country of origin: India
- Original language: Tamil
- No. of seasons: 1
- No. of episodes: 50

Production
- Running time: approx.25–35 minutes per episode

Original release
- Network: Aha Tamil
- Release: 5 December 2025 – 27 March 2026

Dhoolpet Police Station is a 2025 Indian Tamil-language Crime thriller web series directed by Jeshwini and written by Brahma G Dev. The series stars Ashwin Kumar Lakshmikanthan, Guru Lakshmanan, Padine Kumar, Sreethu Krishnan and Preethi Sharma in lead roles. The story follows Dhoolpet Police Station Assistant Commissioner Vetrimaaran and his crime team, who are involved in solving a wealthy young woman’s murder case.

It premiered on the streaming platform Aha Tamil on 5 December 2025 and air in Tamil and Telugu languages. Episode release on every Friday at 7PM and consists of 50 episodes. The show first season ended with 50 episodes on 27 March 2026.

== Series overview ==
Series	Episodes	Originally released	
Series	Episodes	First released	Last released
1	50	5 December 2025	27 March 2026

== Plot ==
Dhoolpet Police Station, this Tamil crime thriller drama focuses on a group of detectives in the Dhoolpet area of Chennai Police. The cold, commanding police ACP Vetrimaran and ACP Arjun work together to investigate a deadly trail of decapitation murders during a vibrant festival, who solve crimes with their variety of skills and investigative methods.

== Cast ==
- Ashwin Kumar Lakshmikanthan as Vetrimaaran
- Guru Lakshmanan as Arjun
- Padine Kumar as Masani
- Sreethu Krishnan as Madhangi
- Preethi Sharma as Priya

== Episodes ==
No.	Title	Directed by	Written by	Original release date
1	"The Destruction of the Demon"	Brahma G Dev	Jeshwini	5 December 2025
2	"Triple Heads, Triple Murders"	Brahma G Dev	Jeshwini	5 December 2025
3	"It Belongs to the Past"	Brahma G Dev	Jeshwini	12 December 2025
4	"Truth and Evidence"	Brahma G Dev	Jeshwini	12 December 2025
5	"Two Poles"	Brahma G Dev	Jeshwini	19 December 2025

== Production ==
=== Development ===
The series was developed as part of the Aha Tamil crime thriller lineup. Kavitha Joubin who is of Aha Tamil, said Dhoolpet will be the first crime series to be presented in a long-format structure. The first look poster, unveiled on 22 October 2025 and Shooting starting from 23 October 2025.

The series is written by Brahma G Dev and directed by Jeshwini. It has music by Ashwath.

=== Casting ===
The series stars Ashwin Kumar Lakshmikanthan as lead role Assistant Commissioner Vetrimaaran, alongside Guru Lakshmanan, Padine Kumar, Sreethu Krishnan and Preethi Sharma. The serial also reunited Guru Lakshmanan and Padine Kumar, who previously starred together one years before on Disney+ Hotstar’s series Heart Beat.
