= List of programs broadcast by Shakthi TV =

This is the list of television programs currently and formerly broadcast by Shakthi TV. The channel's programming includes drama serials, reality shows, talk shows and news programs.

== Currently broadcast ==
=== Drama series ===
| Serial Name | Original Channel |
|---|---|
| Lakshmi Stores (லட்சுமி ஸ்டோர்ஸ்) | Sun TV |
| Nayaki (நாயகி) | Sun TV |
| Roja (ரோஜா) | Sun TV |
| Kanmani (கண்மணி) | Sun TV |
| Arundhathi (அருந்ததி) | Sun TV |
| Azhagu (அழகு) | Sun TV |
| Priyamanaval (பிரியமானவள்) | Sun TV |
| Neeya 7 (நீயா 7) | Sun TV |
| Pandian Stores (பாண்டியன் ஸ்டார்ஸ்) | Star Vijay |
| Kalyana Veedu (கல்யாண வீடு) | Sun TV |
| Mahalakshmi (மகாலட்சுமி) | Sun TV |
| Tamil Selvi (தமிழ்ச்செல்வி) | Sun TV |
| Run (ரன்) | Sun TV |
| Chinnathirai (சின்னத்திரை) | Original |
| Neeya | Colors TV |
| Vinayagar (விநாயகர்) | Sun TV |
| Jai Hanumaan (ஜெய் ஹனுமான்) | Sun TV |

=== Reality / non-scripted shows ===
| Shows | Original Channel |
|---|---|
Mythological
| Religious songs (பக்தி பாடல்கள்) | |
| Thirupathi Mahimai(திருப்பதி மகிமை) | |
Shows
| Good Morning Sri Lanka – Live | |
| Galatta Comedy | |
| Cinema Cafe | |
| Isai 100%25 | |
| Magalir Mattum | |
| Behind The Scene | |
| Shakthi Chat | |
| Comedy Junction (காமெடி ஜங்ஷன்) | Sun TV |
| Sun Singer (சன் சிங்கர்) | Sun TV |
| Makkaludan minnal | |
| Ilayaganam | |
| 7788 | |
| Penmanikkaha | |
| Relax Time | |
| Kutty Chutty | |
| Kids 1st | |
| Sandhipoma | |
| Shakthi Grand Master | |

== Formerly broadcast ==
=== Sun TV drama series ===
- Kolangal
- Anandham
- Chiththi
- Mettioli
- Aathira
- Chinna Papa Periya Papa
- Devayani
- EMI
- Ival Oru Thodarkathai
- Mahabratham
- Maragatha Veenai
- Sakthi

=== Vijay TV drama series ===
- Ithu kadhala ?
- Kalyanam Mudhal Kadhal Varai
- Kaviyanjali
- Neeli
- Nee Naan Aval
- Office

=== IBC Tamil drama series ===
- Yazhini

=== Colors TV drama series ===
- Naagin as Neeya
- Mahakaali
