= M. Saravanan =

M. Saravanan is an Indian male given name may refer to:

- Saravanan Murugan, Malaysian politician
- M. Saravanan (producer) (born 1940), Indian film producer
- M. Saravanan (director) (born 1977), Indian film director in Tamil cinema
