= C. Sathya =

Indian music composer and singer

- Born: 6 February 1978 (age 48); Chennai
- Origin: India
- Genre: Playback
- Occupations: Composer, singer
- Years active: 2000-present

C. Sathya is an Indian music composer and playback singer who predominantly works in Tamil cinema. He made his debut with the sleeper hit Engaeyum Eppothum (2011).

== Early life ==
Sathya's background in Carnatic music had greatly influenced his skills in film music composition. Being a Carnatic singer and playing the harmonium, he grasped the intricacies of music composition. This extended to the keyboard, which he not only played but also programmed for music directors, including Bharadwaj.

== Career ==
Despite facing initial challenges, Sathya got his first break with the film "Yen Ippadi Mayakinai" in 2009, although its release was cancelled. However, the songs gained popularity in the audio circuit. It was after three years when the producers of Engaeyum Eppothum (2011) heard his compositions that he finally received recognition. The film turned out to be a sleeper hit, propelling Sathya's career forward. His exceptional work in this film opened doors for him, and he has gained recognition and admiration in the industry for his distinct and melodic musical style.

Subsequently, he worked on projects like Sevarkkodi (2012) and Ponmaalai Pozhudhu (2012) in quick succession. His notable scores include Theeya Velai Seiyyanum Kumaru (2013), Nedunchaalai (2013), Ivan Veramathiri (2013), Velainu Vandhutta Vellaikaaran (2016), and Aranmanai 3 (2021). Sathya's recent involvement includes his work on the film Naadu, showcasing his continued contributions to the industry.

== Discography ==
=== Films ===
==== As music composer ====
Year	Tamil	Other languages	Notes
2008	Yen Ippadi Mayakinai		Film unreleased
2011	Engeyum Eppodhum	Journey (Telugu)	
2012	Sevarkodi		
2012	Ponmaalai Pozhudhu		
2013	Theeya Velai Seiyyanum Kumaru	Something Something (Telugu)	
2013	Nedunchaalai		
2013	Ivan Veramathiri	Citizen (Telugu)	
2014	Kathai Thiraikathai Vasanam Iyakkam		Background score only
2015	Asurakulam		Film unreleased
2015	Kanchana 2		Composed one song "Sillatta Vellatta"
2016	Velainu Vandhutta Vellaikaaran		
2016	Unnodu Ka		
2017	Koditta Idangalai Nirappuga		
2017	Bayama Irukku		
2018	Pakka		
2019	Oththa Seruppu Size 7		BGM only
2019	Aghavan		
2020	Naanga Romba Busy		
2021	Theedhum Nandrum		
2021	Vinodhaya Sitham		
2021	Aranmanai 3		25th film as a composer Special appearance in the song "Theeyaga Thondri"
2022	Theal		
2022	Raangi		
2023	Naadu		
2024	Hit List		
2025	Gangers		

Upcoming films

Year	Film	Notes
2026	Aleka	delayed
2026	Aayiram Jenmangal	delayed
2026	Jet Lee	
2026	Jasmine	

==== As singer ====
Year	Film	Song(s)	Lyrics	Co-singer(s)	Notes
2000	Kandukondain Kandukondain	"Yengae Enathu Kavithai"	Vairamuthu	K. S. Chitra, Unni Menon	Uncredited; also appeared in the film's music video
2011	Engeyum Eppodhum	"Masaamaa"	M. Saravanan		
2013	Theeya Velai Seiyyanum Kumaru	"Azhagendral"	Pa. Vijay	Aalap Raju, Ranina Reddy	
2013	Ivan Veramathiri	"Loveulla"	Viveka		
2014	Nedunchaalai	"Thamirabharani"	Mani Amudhavan		
2015	Kanchana 2	"Silatta Pilatta"	Logan	Jagadeesh Kumar	
2021	Theal	"Enna Petha Devadhaiye"	Uma Devi		

=== Television ===
- 2002 Mangalyam (BGM only)
- 2003 Adugiran Kannan
- 2005 Dheerga Sumangali
- 2006 Kana Kaanum Kaalangal
- 2006 Chellamadi Nee Enakku
- 2007 Madurai
- 2008 Rekha IPS
- 2008 Thiruppaavai
- 2009 Mama Mappillai
- 2010 Anu Pallavi
- 2010 Alaipayuthey
- 2010 Amman
- 2011 Saravanan Meenatchi ('Yaelelo' Tittle Track)
- 2012 My Name is Mangamma
- 2012 Vellai Thamarai
- 2012 Paartha Nyabagam Illayo
- 2013 Kurunji Malar
- 2013 Vani Rani
- 2014 Kalyana Parisu
- 2015 Yazhini
- 2018 Maya
- 2018 Nayagi
- 2018 Lakshmi Stores
- 2018 Vandhal Sridevi
- 2020 Uyire
- 2024 Thayamma Kudumbathaar

== Accolades ==
- Jaya Award For Sensational Music Debut – Engeyum Eppodhum
