= Surrender (2025 film) =

2025 Tamil film

- Theatrical release poster
- Directed by: Gowthaman Ganapathy
- Written by: Gowthaman Ganapathy
- Produced by: VRV Kumar
- Starring: Tharshan; Lal; Sujith Shankar
- Cinematography: Meyyendiran
- Edited by: Renu Gopal
- Music by: Vikas Badisa
- Production company: Upbeat Pictures
- Release date: 1 August 2025
- Running time: 143 minutes
- Country: India
- Language: Tamil

Surrender is a 2025 Indian Tamil-language action thriller film written and directed by debutant Gowthaman Ganapathy, starring Tharshan in the lead role alongside Lal, Sujith Shankar, Munishkanth, Padine Kumar and others in important roles.

Surrender released in theatres on 1 August 2025.

== Plot ==
This story revolves around four main characters: an experienced writer Constable, a rookie Sub-Inspector, a local thug, and a small-time politician.

Head Constable Periysamy, an honest man who has been working for more than 20 years as a writer at the same Thirumazhisai police station. Pugazhenthi, a trainee SI appointed at the same station 3 months ago. With the election nearing, it is advised that licensed gun holders from the limit should submit their guns to the station. Actor Mansoor Ali Khan submits his gun to Periyasamy and demands that he needs it as soon as the election is finished. While Periyasamy was placing the gun in the locker, an egoistic lady Inspector deliberately pulls him into a quarrel, which leads him to misplace the gun on the table.

A renowned thug named Kanagu from that area plans to supply a hefty amount of 10 crores to the voters so that their party can win the upcoming election. He got into trouble when the SI, whom he believes double-crossed him and took all the money.

Meanwhile, at the police station, the crew has discovered that the gun has gone missing. Trainee SI Pugazh takes charge of retrieving the gun. That night, Periyasamy was confronted by Kanagu as he ill-treated his brother for drunk & driving. Periyasamy was humiliated in front of Kanagu's gang. As a result, Pugazh is confronted by Kanagu's brother and is made bedridden. Parallel narration is the comedy track of a local politician from Trichy, who contacts Kanagu's brother for gun peddling

After some intense investigations and twists & turns, whether Pughazh and Periyasamy retrieve the gun or not, and whether Kanagu discovers where his money makes it alive, forms the rest of the story.

== Cast ==
- Tharshan as Sub-inspector Pugazh
- Lal as Periyasamy
- Sujith Shankar as Kanagu
- Munishkanth as local politician
- Padine Kumar
- Mansoor Ali Khan as himself
- Vicky

== Production ==
After making his debut through Koogle Kuttappa (2022), Tharshan announced his next project in the lead role, starring alongside Lal, Sujith Shankar, Munishkanth, Mansoor Ali Khan and others in important roles. The film also features Heart Beat (2024) fame Padine Kumar in her debut. The film is written and directed by debutant Gowthaman Ganapathy and produced by VRV Kumar under his Upbeat Pictures banner, while the technical team consists of music composer Vikas Badisa, cinematographer Meyyendiran, editor Renu Gopal, art director RK Manoj Kumar, and stunt choreographer Action Sandhosh.

== Release ==
Surrender released in theatres on 1 August 2025. Its available on Sun NXT Ott platform from September 4, 2025.

== Reception ==
Abhinav Subramanian of The Times of India gave 3/5 stars and wrote "The thing with Surrender is that there's a lack of nuance. Everyone communicates through grunts and threats. [...] We're in a bit of a drought when it comes to great crime-thrillers, and that seems to continue. Everything in Surrender is just so provincial and grimy. [...] The film eventually circles back to its emotional center with Periyasamy, which provides some redemption. At least it's consistently committed to its one-note brutishness." The film was also reviewed by Hindu Tamil Thisai.
