= Padine Kumar =

Indian actress

- Born: Chennai, Tamil Nadu, India
- Occupation: Actress
- Years active: 2020–present

Padine Kumar is an Indian actress who appears in Tamil films, such as Take Diversion (2022), Seesaw (2025) and Surrender (2025), and in the two seasons of the TV series Heart Beat.

== Career ==
Padine initially appeared in the serial Nayagi, which aired on Sun TV in 2020 playing a small role as Shalini. She made her film debut in a "central role" alongside Sivakumar and Ramachandran Duraira in the 2022 film Take Diversion, which was directed by Sivaani Senthil.

She later appeared in Seesaw (2025) and Surrender (2025). Her performance in Seesaw was described as follows: she "delivers a passable performance, her character primarily serving as a barometer for Aadhavan’s mental state, which fluctuates depending on her presence or absence."

Padine, who started a career as cardiac technicianbefore acting, is also known for playing the role of Dr Anitha in the medical drama TV series Heart Beat.

== Filmography ==
| Year | Film | Role | Notes |
|---|---|---|---|
| 2022 | Take Diversion | Yazhini | |
| 2025 | Seesaw | Malavika | |
| 2025 | Surrender | Lalitha | |
| 2026 | Nooru Saami | Sandhya | |

=== Television ===
| Year | Title | Role | Notes |
|---|---|---|---|
| 2020 | Nayagi | Shalini | |
| 2023 | Kanni Raasi | | |
| 2024 | Start Music | Contestant | |
| 2024 | Samayal Express | Guest | |
| 2024–2025 | Heart Beat (seasons 1 and 2) | Dr. Anitha | |
| 2025 | Vera Maari Trip | Paaru / Paarvathi | |
| 2025 | Oo Solriya Oo Oohm Solriya season 3 | Contestant | |
| 2025–2026 | Dhoolpet Police Station | Masani | |
