= Tharshan Thiyagarajah =

Sri-Lankan actor and model

- Born: 17 September 1990 (age 35); Jaffna, Sri Lanka
- Occupations: Model; actor
- Years active: 2014–present
- Title: Mister Srilanka International (2014)

Tharshan Thiyagarajah (born 17 September 1990) is a Sri Lankan actor and model who works prominently in Tamil film industry.

== Early life and career ==
Tharshan is from Jaffna, Sri Lanka and worked as an engineer in an IT company. He started his career in 2014 as a model and won the Mister Sri Lanka International competition title. After some problems with his modeling sponsor, he decided to leave to India. He appeared in minor roles in a few Indian Tamil films. In 2019, he made his debut into Indian television by participating as a contestant in the reality show Bigg Boss Tamil 3. After his participation in the show he also appeared in the television show The Wall with Mugen Rao. Following Bigg Boss, Tharshan was offered to star in Koogle Kuttappa (2022) co-starring K. S. Ravikumar and fellow Sri Lankan actress Losliya Mariyanesan. The film was a remake of the Malayalam film Android Kunjappan Version 5.25. His next film was the village drama Naadu (2023) directed by M. Saravanan, which he shot for at Kolli Hills. To prepare for his role in the 2025 crime drama, Surrender, he trained with a police officer for two weeks.

== Filmography ==
- All films are in Tamil, unless otherwise noted.

Year	Film	Role	Notes
2017	Ivan Thanthiran	Reporter/News anchor	Uncredited role
2022	Koogle Kuttappa	Aadhi	
2023	Naadu	Maari	
2025	Surrender	Pugazh	

=== Television ===
Year	Title	Role	Channel	Notes	Ref
2019	Bigg Boss Tamil 3	Contestant	Star Vijay	Evicted Day 98	
2019	The Wall	Guest	Star Vijay		
2019	Bigg Boss 3 Kondattam	Himself	Star Vijay	Special show	

=== Other work ===
Year	Song	Notes
2016	Nee Pona Pinnaal	Music video from the album Jubesh
2021	Thaaiku Pin Thaaram	Short film
2022	Aitha Lakka	Music video

== Awards and nominations ==
Year	Featured by	Listing category	Result	Ref.
2020	Times of India	Chennai Times 20 Most Desirable Men on Television of 2019	Rank 4	
2020	Times of India	Chennai Times 30 Most Desirable Men of 2019	Rank 18	
