= Chakravyuha (2016 film) =

- Film poster
- Directed by: M. Saravanan
- Written by: M. Saravanan
- Screenplay by: M. Saravanan
- Produced by: N. K. Lohith
- Starring: Puneeth Rajkumar; Arun Vijay; Rachita Ram
- Narrated by: Kichcha Sudeep
- Cinematography: Shanmuga Sundaram
- Edited by: M. Subarak
- Music by: Thaman S
- Production company: Sunshine Creations
- Distributed by: Jayanna Films
- Release date: 29 April 2016
- Running time: 124 minutes
- Country: India
- Language: Kannada

Chakravyuha (transl. Labyrinth) is a 2016 Indian Kannada-language vigilante action film written and directed by M. Saravanan and produced by N. K. Lohith under the Sunshine Creations banner. An adaptation of Saravanan's own Tamil-language film Ivan Veramathiri, the film stars Puneeth Rajkumar, Arun Vijay and Rachita Ram, while Abhimanyu Singh, Sadhu Kokila, Bhavya, and Rangayana Raghu play supporting roles. Thaman S composed the film's score and soundtrack.

The film was dubbed in Hindi with the same name by Shree International, in Telugu as Civil Engineer, and in Tamil as Chakravyuham (despite having the original Tamil version). The key sequences of the film (not found in the Tamil version) went on to be re-used in the Odia remake version Abhaya (2017)

== Plot ==
Sadashivayya, who was a former gangster and present Karnataka State Law minister asks for an illegal quota in student admissions in Government Law College, but the principal refuses. In order to remove the principal, he instigates violence on the law college campus using his students in the college. One of the students manages to come out of the campus, but gets badly wounded. Before fainting, he reveals Sadashivayya's plan to a Civil Engineer named Lohith. Lohith, along with his compounder friend Sadhu, takes the student to the hospital and learns that he is suffering from blood loss.

Lohith then takes Anjali, a college student, and makes her donate blood, but the next day the student dies, and his grief-stricken mother screams in public. Lohith takes the incident seriously and kidnaps Omkaar, who is the paroled-brother of Sadashivayya and the prepatators behind the violence in the college, where he locks him in an abandoned construction site. The next day, Omkaar tries to escape, but Lohith disguises himself and thrashes Omkaar, locking him in another room. Sadashivayya tries to find Omkaar, but to no avail when he is arrested as he had given legal assurance for his brother's parole.

Lohith then leaves Omkaar in the highway and Omkaar is taken to the hospital by his henchmen. When he learns of his brother's imprisonment, he swears vengeance on Lohith and decide to track Lohith secretly by pretending to be unstable. When the police learn about Omkaar's plan, they try to arrest him, but Omkar escapes and stops a biker for lift, who is revealed to be Lohith. Lohith manages to subdue the police. Soon after, Omkaar escapes leaving Lohith. Omkaar then realizes that Lohith was the kidnapper. Later, Anjali, who is in love with Lohith, teases him, to which Lohith angrily rejects Anjali.

Though devastated, Anjali selflessly calls Omkaar and tells him that she knows the kidnapper. At the hideout, Anjali shows him an article that reveals he crashed in a bike accident. Omkaar knows Anjali was lying when he kidnaps her and brings her to the same building where Lohith had kept Omkaar for days. Meanwhile, ACP Raghu starts interrogating Sadashivayya. Just then, Sadashivayya tries to escape, but Raghu shoots him. Omkaar challenges Lohith to save the people who are beloved to him.

Lohith then reaches his home where he deduces that Omkaar was about to kidnap his mother. Lohith thrashes the goons while he brings Omkaar to the same building to learn where Anjali is kept hostage. Lohith manages to save Anjali. While he is taking her to the hospital, Omkaar tries to attack Lohith, but ACP Raghu shoots and kills Omkaar. He salutes Lohith and tells him to leave; Lohith leaves with Anjali and they reunite.

== Cast ==
- Puneeth Rajkumar as Lohith, Civil Engineer
- Arun Vijay as Omkaar
- Rachita Ram as Anjali
- Abhimanyu Singh as Sadashivayya, Law Minister and Omkaar's elder brother
- Sadhu Kokila as Sadhu, a maistry
- Rangayana Raghu as ACP Raghu
- Bhavya as Lohith's mother
- Sandeep Yadav as a spy
- Sithara as a student's mother
- Sudeep as narrator (voiceover only)

== Production ==
The movie made a profit before its release. As per sources, the distribution and audio rights of the movie had been sold out for an amount of ₹14 crores.

=== Development ===
In February 2015, it was reported that M. Saravanan and Puneeth Rajkumar would work together for the first time. S. Thaman was selected to compose the music for the film. Chakravyuha, was anticipated because of the associated marketing.

=== Casting ===
Sonam Bajwa was the first choice for the lead role but was replaced with Pallavi Subhash after her look test was unimpressive. However, Pallavi was dropped after a couple of days of shoot since the director was not impressed and felt the need for an actress who knew the language better. Rachita Ram was roped into playing the lead actress role, which marked her debut collaboration with Puneeth Rajkumar. Incidentally, actor Vamsi Krishna was approached by director Saravanan to reprise the role he had done in the original, Ivan Veramathiri. However, the dates did not work out, and the role was offered to his friend Arun Vijay.

=== Filming ===
The film went on floors in 2015. A song shoot has been shot in Portugal. This is the first Kannada movie whose song shoot was held in Portugal.

== Soundtrack ==
Chakravyuha

Soundtrack album by S. Thaman
- Released: 17 March 2016
- Recorded: 2016
- Genre: Film soundtrack
- Length: 14:34
- Language: Kannada
- Label: Anand Audio
- Producer: S. Thaman

S. Thaman chronology
| Dictator (2015) | Chakravyuha (2016) | Aarathu Sinam (2016) |
External audio
- Official Audio Jukebox on YouTube

Songs of the movie have been released on 17 March 2016, coinciding with the birthday of the actor Puneeth Rajkumar.

S. Thaman composed the soundtrack album (containing 4 songs) and background score for the film. The song recording of the movie commenced already, Telugu actor N. T. Rama Rao Jr. sung a song Geleya Geleya, which was his first playback singing in Kannada film and Kajal Aggarwal sung a song Yenaithu, which was her first playback singing in any language, despite not knowing Kannada language. The beginning portion of the song "Ninthalli Nillalaare" reuses a part of Thaman's "Megastar Intro Theme" from Bruce Lee: The Fighter (2015).

Track listing
| No. | Title | Lyrics | Singer(s) | Length |
|---|---|---|---|---|
| 1. | "Geleya Geleya" | Chandan Shetty | N. T. Rama Rao Jr. | 3:14 |
| 2. | "Yenaithu" | Kaviraj | Puneeth Rajkumar, Kajal Aggarwal | 4:44 |
| 3. | "Ninthalli Nillalaare" | Kaviraj | Megha | 4:28 |
| 4. | "Theme of Chakravyuha" | Chandan Shetty | Chandan Shetty | 2:08 |
| 5. | "Yenaithu" (Remix) | | | 5:02 |
| Total length: | | | | 14:34 |

The album was also released in Hindi it contains 3 songs and all lyrics by Shree International Company

Hindi Track listing
| No. | Title | Singer(s) | Length |
|---|---|---|---|
| 1. | "Khushiyaan Khushiyaan" | | 03:14 |
| 2. | "Are Are Kaun Hain Tu" | | 04:40 |
| 3. | "Natkhat Tera Pyaar (Movie Version)" | Megha | 03:24 |
| 4. | "Natkhat Tera Pyaar (Original Version)" | Megha | 03:28 |
| Total length: | | | 16:49 |

== Release ==
The film release is planned for 29 April 2016, with a premier on 28 April at Australia. It is set to have a global opening and planned to release in more than 50 countries, including the UK, South Africa, Hong Kong, Singapore, Malaysia, UAE, US and Canada.

=== Critical reception ===
Chakravyuha received mixed reviews from critics.

Bangalore Mirror wrote "how it was interesting that the hero's name is used only four times in the entire movie, that too in the second half only".

== Awards and nominations ==
=== Mirchi Music Awards ===
Star as A Singing Sensation - Jr. NTR (for "Geleya Geleya") 6th South Indian International Movie Awards:

- Best Actor in a Negative Role – Kannada – Nominated – Arun Vijay
- Best Male Playback Singer – Kannada – Nominated - Jr. NTR (for "Geleya Geleya")
