= Chirashree Anchan =

Indian actress

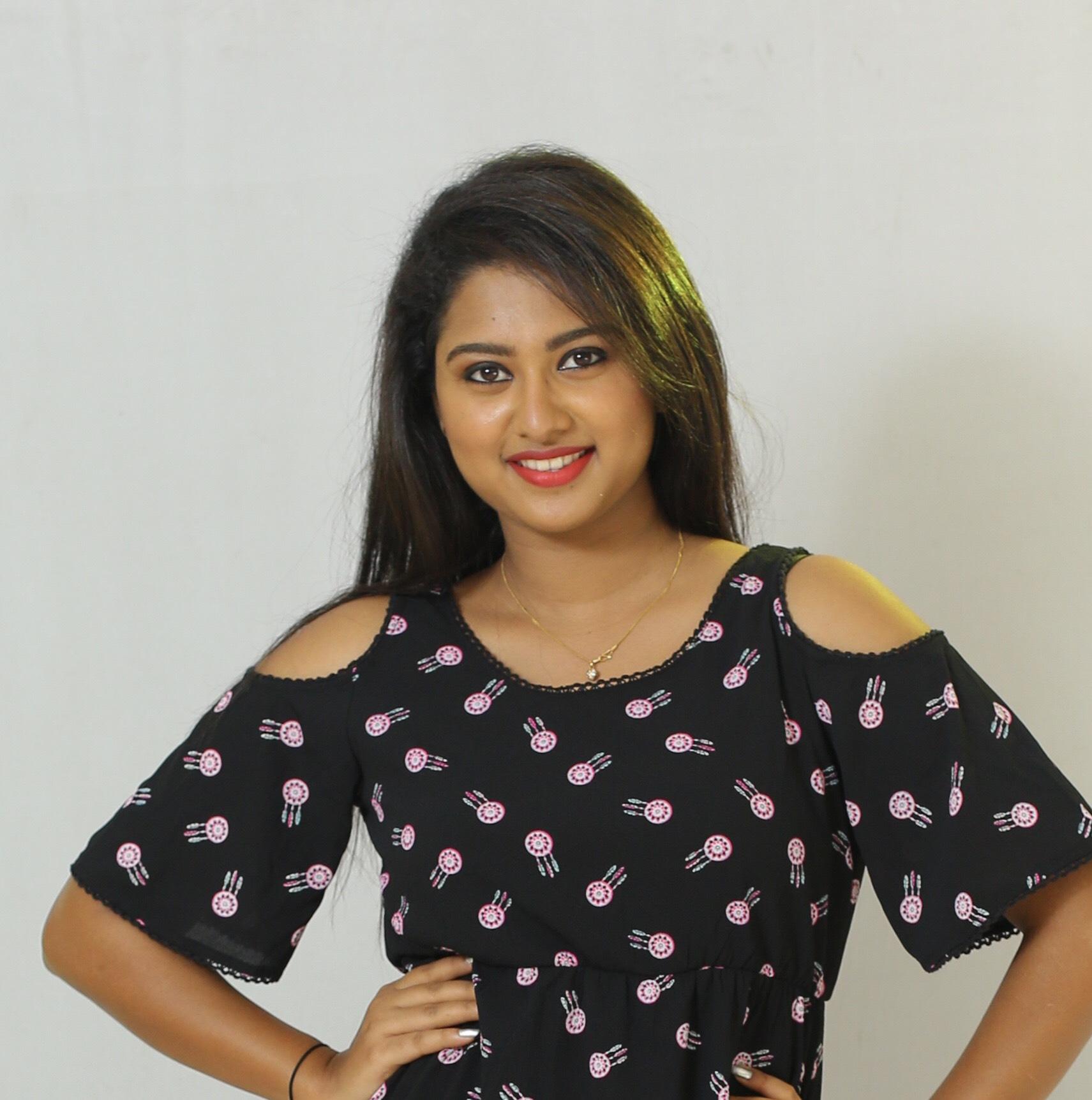
- Born: Mangalore, India
- Occupation(s): Actress, model
- Years active: 2016–present

Chirashree Anchan is an Indian actress who appears in Tulu, Kannada, Telugu and Tamil movies.

== Early life ==
Chirashree Anchan was born in a Tulu speaking Billava family in Mangalore to Madhusoodan Anchan and Poornima Madhu.

== Film career ==
She debuted in coastal wood movie Pavithra (2016) which run successfully in the box office and next acted in Prajwal Kumar Attavar directorial Rambarooti (2016). Chirashree got signed for Telugu and Kannada movie Aame Athadaithe (2016) and Kalpana 2 (2016) respectively.

Chirashree was seen in the Aravind Kaushik directorial Huliraaya(2017). Her next Kannada movie was Udumba. Chirashree made her Tamil debut in Aghavan.

She also played a lead role in the Telugu movie Duppatlo minnagu (2019) Directed by Yendamuri Veerendranath.

== Filmography ==
Year	Movie	Director	Language	Ref
2016	Pavithra	Naga Venkatesh	Tulu	
2016	Rambarooti	Preethi Prajwal Kumar	Tulu	
2016	Kalpana 2	R. Anatha Raju	Kannada	
2017	Aame Athadaithe	Surya Narayan	Telugu	
2017	Huliraaya	Malli Aravind Kaushik	Kannada	
2018	Shivana Paada		Kannada	
2018	Karne		Tulu	
2018	Karikambaliyalli Midinaaga		Kannada	
2019	Udumba		Kannada	
2019	Aghavan		Tamil	
2019	Aapina Matha Yeddege		Tulu	
2020	Kaliveera	Aviram	Kannada	
2022	Inamdar	Sandesh Shetty	Kannada	
2022	Deal	Sunee	Tulu	

== Award ==
Chirashree awarded 'Viewers Choice Best Actress' award for 2016 at a popular Tulu film awards event. Chirashree also bagged best actress award for her debut movie Pavithra at Red FM film awards in the year 2018.
