= Pyali =

Indian film

- Directed by: Babitha Mathew-Rinn A. X.
- Written by: Babitha Mathew-Rinn A. X.
- Produced by: Sofia Varghese; Dulquer Salman
- Starring: Barbiee; George Jacob; Sreenivasan; Mamukkoya
- Cinematography: Jiju Sunny
- Edited by: Deepu S. Joseph
- Music by: Prashant Pillai
- Production companies: NF Varghese Pictures; Wayfarer Films
- Release date: 8 July 2022
- Country: India
- Language: Malayalam

Pyali (lit. 'river, tree') is a 2022 Malayalam-language drama film written and directed by the duo Babitha Mathew-Rinn A. X. and produced by Sofia Varghese, daughter of late Malayalam actor N. F. Varghese, under NF Varghese Pictures, and Dulquer Salmaan's Wayfarer Films.

The lead roles are played by child artists Barbiee Sharma and George Jacob. The film also features veteran actors Sreenivasan and Mamukkoya, along with Rafi, Appani Sarath, Sujith Shankar and Aadukalam Murugadoss in pivotal roles.

The writing of the story began back in the latter part of 2015 and had been in the works since then after finding a producer in 2018. The film was shot in parts of Ernakulam, Fort Kochi and Vathuruthy Colony in July and November 2019.

Prashant Pillai composed four songs for the film in Hindi and English, and there were plans to include a Malayalam song as well. The crew includes editor Deepu Joseph, art director Santhosh Raman, and sound designer Renganaath Ravee.

The film was released on 8 July 2022.

== Plot ==
The story revolves around the bond between a sister and brother. Barbiee plays the titular five-year-old, while Jacob plays her 14-year-old brother named Ziyah.

The Kashmiri-origin siblings are orphans who live in a slum in Kerala. Despite facing many difficulties, Ziyah makes sure to do his best by his little sister. The story is about the siblings overcoming hurdles to fulfill their little desires.

== Cast ==
- Aravya Sharma as Pyali
- George Jacob as Ziyah
- Sreenivasan as Zayed
- Mamukkoya as Nicholan
- Rafi
- Appani Sarath
- Sujith Shankar
- Aadukalam Murugadoss
- Unni Mukundan as Miska Saha Salman (Cameo appearance)
- Karthik Vishnu

== Production ==
Barbiee has previously acted in Hindi films like Baaghi 2 and Bharat as well as television serials. Jacob was selected after auditioning hundreds of kids. They were very specific about the appearance of both children as the characters are of Kashmiri origin. Jacob was born and brought up in Dubai. Since everything about Kerala and the language was new to him, we trained him for two days on the dialect, the body language of a slum kid, and much more. Barbiee having previous experience, only needed to be taught the Malayalam dialogues.

Babitha and Rinn were previously working as an IT professional and an interior designer, respectively, before entering the film industry a few years ago. Pyali marks their feature directorial debut.

== Accolades ==
Year	Award	Category	Recipient	Notes
2021	Kerala State Film Awards	Best Child Artist	Barbiee Sharma	
2021	Kerala State Film Awards	Best Art Director	Santhosh Raman	
