= Parundhaaguthu Oor Kuruvi =

2023 Indian film

- Theatrical Release Poster
- Directed by: Dhanabalan Govindaraj
- Written by: Dhanabalan Govindaraj
- Produced by: Eav Suresh; Sundhara Krishna.P; Venki Chandrsekhar
- Starring: Nishanth Russo; Vivek Prasanna; Gayathiri Iyer
- Cinematography: Ashwin Noel
- Edited by: Nelson Anthony
- Music by: Renjith Unni
- Production company: Lights On Media
- Release date: 24 March 2023
- Running time: 132 minutes
- Country: India
- Language: Tamil

Parundhaaguthu Oor Kuruvi (transl. The village sparrow becomes the hawk) is a 2023 Indian Tamil-language action thriller film written and directed by Dhanabalan Govindara. The film stars Nishanth Russo, Vivek Prasanna, and Gayathiri Iyer in the lead roles. The film was released theatrically on 24 March 2023. The film received mixed to negative reviews from critics.

== Cast ==
- Nishanth Russo as Aadhi
- Vivek Prasanna as Maaran
- Gayathiri Iyer as Yamini
- Vinod Sagar as Inspector Dharmaraj
- E. Ramdoss as Politician
- Kodangi Vadivel as Sub-Inspector Bose
- Aroul D. Shankar as Gang Leader
- Abishek as Aadhi's friend
- Fox as Yamini's manager
- Vijay Peter as Yamini's advocate
- Dhanapalan Govindaraj as tea master
- Shankar as Head Constable

== Production ==
The first look of the film was released by the actor Vijay Sethupathi, who noted this as the debut movie for the director. The trailer launch for the film was held on 4 March 2022. The production company announced the rating that the film got U/A censored with the release date.

== Music ==
Music by Renjith Unni.

- Madhayaanai Kootam"
- "Kaadu Onnu"
- "Moving On" - Aparna Narayanan

== Reception ==
The film was released on 24 March 2023 across Tamil Nadu. Logesh Balachandran of The Times of India gave 2 stars out of 5 and wrote that "The movie tries to be different, but ultimately falls short due to its mediocre filmmaking and inappropriate characters." Anusha Sundar from Cinema Express noted that "Parundhaaguthu Oor Kuruvi has a decent premise and a fairly exciting plot" and gave 2 rating out of 5.

However, Maalai Malar critic stated that "Despite choosing a different story, the screenplay of the film did not focus" and gave 2 out of 5 rating. Dinamalar critic gave 2 out of 5 rating.
