= Sotta Sotta Nanaiyuthu =

2025 Tamil film

- Theatrical release poster
- Directed by: Naveedh S Fareedh
- Written by: Naveedh S Fareedh
- Starring: Nishanth Russo; Varshini Venkat; Shaalini; KPY Raja
- Cinematography: Rayeez
- Edited by: Ram Sathish
- Music by: Renjith Unni
- Production company: Adler Entertainment
- Release date: 29 August 2025
- Country: India
- Language: Tamil

Sotta Sotta Nanaiyuthu (transl. [Scalp] wettens as hair falls; lit. 'It's dripping wet') is a 2025 Indian Tamil-language comedy film written and directed by Naveedh S Fareedh in his directorial debut starring Nishanth Russo, Varshini Venkat, Shaalini and KPY Raja in the lead roles. The film is produced by Adler Entertainment, while the technical team consists of cinematographer Rayeez, editor Ram Sathish and music composer Renjith Unni. Principal photography was completed in 18 days. The film was released in theatres on 29 August 2025.

== Cast ==
- Nishanth Russo as Raja
- Varshini Venkat as Shruti
- Shaalini as Priya
- KPY Raja as Rocky
- Anand Pandi as Raja's uncle
- Robo Shankar as Kulukkal Kumaresan
- KPY Vinoth as Prem
- Pugazh as Rocket

== Music ==
The film has music composed by Renjith Unni.

All lyrics are written by Nesan.

Track listing
No.	Title	Singer(s)	Length
1.	"Golugappa"	Javed Ali, Sivaangi Krishnakumar
2.	"Mandhira Kannaley"	Jithin Raj, Neha Venugopal
3.	"Uyirae"	Vaishnav Girish

== Release ==
Sotta Sotta Nanaiyuthu released in theatres on 29 August 2025.

== Reception ==
Abhinav Subramanian of The Times of India gave 2/5 stars and wrote "Sotta Sotta's problem is not necessarily the idea. You can make a sharp comedy from something as everyday as male pattern baldness. The problem is the writing, which works top-down. [...] Sotta Sotta wants to be relatable. It forgets that a good narrative and characters come before platforms." Jayabhuvaneshwari B of Cinema Express gave 2/5 stars and wrote "Sotta Sotta Naniyuthu loses the plot faster than losing hair, only to come back to baldness struggles towards the end of the film, by which time you forget about the hair, or lack thereof. The film also struggles with patchy writing, as scenes are put together with no segue or coherence."

Dina Thanthi wrote that Naveed S. Fareed draws attention with moving scenes that humorously portray the painful lives of those living with bald heads. Hindu Tamil Thisai wrote that although many people have hair problems traditionally, the film does not delve deeply into the fact that hair problems are a problem caused by work pressure, lifestyle, and diet for most of today's youth; instead, the film makes you soak in humorous advice.
