= Silent (film) =

Indian crime mystery thriller film

- Theatrical release poster
- Directed by: Ganesha Pandi
- Written by: Ganesha Pandi
- Produced by: S Ram Prakash
- Starring: Ganesha Pandi; Namitha Marimuthu; Aaradhya; T. Samaya Murali; Murali Ramakrishnan
- Cinematography: Seyon Muthu; Ganesh S
- Edited by: Sharan Shanmugam
- Music by: Samaya Murali T
- Production company: SR Dream Studios
- Release date: 29 November 2024
- Country: India
- Language: Tamil

Silent is a 2024 Indian Tamil-language crime mystery thriller film written and directed by Ganesha Pandi. The film stars Ganesha Pandi and Samaya Murali, Aradhya , Murali Radhakrishnan .The film was produced by S Ram Prakash under the banner of SR Dream Studios.

== Cast ==
- Ganesha Pandi as Bhuvanesh / Bhuvaneshwari
- T. Samaya Murali
- Murali Ramakrishnan
- Namitha Marimuthu
- Aaradhya
- Ramachandran Durairaj

== Production ==
The film was produced by S Ram Prakash under the banner of SR Dream Studios. The cinematography was done by Seyon Muthu and Ganesh S while editing was handled by Sharan Shanmugam and music composed by Samaya Murali T.

== Reception ==
Thinaboomi critic stated that "The film would have been a success if a little more attention had been paid to the screenplay. Definitely watch it once and enjoy it." Dinakaran critic gave mixed reviews.
