= Nishanth Russo =

Indian actor

- Born: Chennai, Tamil Nadu, India
- Occupation: Actor
- Years active: 2018–Present

Nishanth Russo is an Indian actor who works in Tamil-language films.

== Career ==
Nishanth Russo made his debuted in film Antony in 2018 under the stage name of Nishanth. He later appeared in Pandrikku Nandri Solli. The film received mixed reviews, with OTTplay stating, "The movie, which has a handful of neatly written and suspense-filled sequences, keeps the audience engaged."

In 2023, he co-starred in Parundhaaguthu Oor Kuruvi along with Vivek Prasanna. Cinema Express critic wrote that "Parundhaaguthu Oor Kuruvi has a decent premise and a fairly exciting plot" In 2025, he appeared in Seesaw directed by Guna Subramaniam. Followed by the comedy Sotta Sotta Nanaiyuthu.

== Filmography ==
Year	Film	Role	Notes
2018	Antony	Antony	credited as Nishanth
2022	Pandrikku Nandri Solli	Devaraj	credited as Nishanth
2023	Parundhaaguthu Oor Kuruvi	Aadhi	
2025	Seesaw	Adhavan	
2025	Sotta Sotta Nanaiyuthu	Raja	
TBD	Konjanaal Poru Thalaiva †		
