= Aghavan =

2019 Indian film by APG Elumalai

- Directed by: APG Elumalai
- Written by: APG Elumalai
- Produced by: R. Ravichandran
- Starring: Kishore Ravichandran; Chirashree Anchan; Nithya Shetty
- Cinematography: Bala Palaniappan
- Edited by: LVK Dass
- Music by: C. Sathya
- Production company: RBK Movies
- Release date: 15 March 2019
- Running time: 152 minutes
- Country: India
- Language: Tamil

Aghavan is a 2019 Indian Tamil-language mystery-thriller film written and directed by APG Elumalai on his directorial debut. The film stars Kishore Ravichandran, Chirashree Anchan and Nithya Shetty in the lead roles. C. Sathya composed the music for the film, while cinematography was handled by Bala Palaniappan.

== Plot ==
Hero Kishore Ravichandran works in a temple and does all kinds of work to wash away his sins, at least that's what he tells his colleague (Thambi Ramaiah). However, actually, Kishore is an undercover cop who safeguards the temple from an organized criminal gang who sketches a master plan to loot the wealth hidden ages back.

== Cast ==
- Kishore Ravichandran
- Naren V.
- Chirashree Anchan
- Nithya Shetty
- Thambi Ramaiah
- Chinni Jayanth
- R. N. R. Manohar

== Production ==
The film is directed by APG Elumalai, a former assistant of film director Prabhu Solomon and insisted that the film is based on temple tale, implies the conflict between good and evil inside the human beings. The film is predominantly shot in Agasteeswarar Temple, Kolapakkam and the plot of the story is developed inside the temple.

The filmmakers roped in Kannada actress Chirashree Anchan and Telugu actress Nitya Shetty to play leads in the film and the film marks the Tamil acting debut for the former.

== Reception ==
The Times of India gave the film one-and-half out of five stars and wrote that "The several flashback episodes and multiple non-linear narrations confuse the audience, and the never-ending screenplay makes things worse".
