= Lara (2025 film) =

Indian suspense thriller film

- Theatrical release poster
- Directed by: Mani Moorthi
- Written by: Mani Moorthi
- Produced by: M Karthikesan
- Starring: Ashok Kumar Balakrishnan; M Karthikesan; Anusreya Rajan
- Cinematography: Rj Raveen
- Edited by: Valar Pandi
- Music by: Raghu Sravan Kumar
- Production company: Mk Film Media Works
- Release date: 3 January 2025
- Running time: 117 minutes
- Country: India
- Language: Tamil

Lara is a 2025 Indian Tamil-language suspense thriller film written and directed by Mani Moorthi. The film stars Ashok Kumar Balakrishnan and M Karthikesan. The film was produced by Karthikesan under the banner of Mk Film Media Works. Lara was released in theatres on 3 January 2025.

== Cast ==
- Ashok Kumar Balakrishnan as Maharoof
- M Karthikesan as Inspector Karthikesan
- Anusreya Rajan as Lara
- Varshini Venkat
- Venmathi
- Dileep Kumar (Dhilipkumarreddy) as Sathya
- Mathew Varghese
- Pradeep
- Bala as Lawrence
- SK Babu

== Production ==
The film was produced by M. Karthikesan under Mk Film Media Works. The cinematography was done by Rj Raveen while editing was handled by Valar Pandi and music composed by Raghu Sravan Kumar.

== Reception ==
Abhinav Subramanian of The Times of India rated two point five out of five and stated that "It's a film that proves you can tick all the right boxes on the suspense checklist and still leave your audience feeling like they've read yesterday's case files."
