= Joe Malloori =

Indian actor

- Born: 22 December 1964 (age 61)
- Occupations: Writer, actor
- Years active: 2008–present

Joe Malloori (born 22 December 1964) is an Indian actor who has appeared in Tamil language films. After making his debut in Prabhu Solomon's Kumki (2012), he has appeared as antagonist and supporting actor in other ventures.

== Career ==
Joe Malloori had been a Tamil writer, notably working on poems and documentaries including Paal Nilappaadhaiyil. He made his acting debut in 2008 before starring in Prabhu Solomon's Kumki (2012), appearing as Mathayaan, a tribal leader. He won critical acclaim for his performance, with a reviewer from The Hindu noting "Solomon’s choice of Joe Malluri for the strong role of Mathayaan is laudable." He has since appeared as in other ventures including Jilla and Rummy.

== Filmography ==
Year	Film	Roles	Notes
2008	Bommalattam	Crew member	Uncredited
2012	Kumki	Mathayaan	
2013	Varuthapadatha Valibar Sangam	Police Inspector	
2013	Jannal Oram		
2014	Jilla	Veerapandi	
2014	Rummy	Periyavar	
2014	Tenaliraman	Nandhivarma Rayar	
2014	Anjaan	Karim Bhai	
2014	Irumbu Kuthirai	Ruban	
2014	Mosakutty	Virumandi	
2014	Appuchi Gramam	Chinnasami	
2015	Kaaka Muttai	Pazharasam	
2015	Strawberry	D'Souza	
2015	Puli	Herbalist	
2016	Thirunaal	Vidhya's father	
2016	Virumandikkum Sivanandikkum	Virumandi	
2016	Parandhu Sella Vaa	Douglas	
2017	Singam 3	School teacher	
2017	Saravanan Irukka Bayamaen	Fathima's father	
2018	Aarudhra	A. M. Thanikachalam (AMT)	
2020	Meendum Oru Mariyathai	Man in old age home	
2021	Velan	Thillaiyar	
2021	Anandham Vilayadum Veedu	Periyambala	
2022	Pandrikku Nandri Solli	Shanmuga Pandiyan	
2023	Run Baby Run	Dr. Francis Raja	
2023	Pathu Thala	Sabari	
2024	Yaavarum Vallavare		

== See also ==
- Cinema of India
