= Antony (2018 film) =

- Directed by: Kutti Kumar
- Written by: Kutti Kumar
- Starring: Lal; Nishanth; Vaishali
- Cinematography: R. Balaji
- Edited by: Karthikeyan
- Music by: Sivatmikha
- Production company: Adithya Entertainments
- Distributed by: Mass Entertainment
- Release date: 1 June 2018
- Country: India
- Language: Tamil

Antony is a 2018 Indian Tamil-language action drama film written and directed by Kutti Kumar. The film stars Lal, Nishanth, and Vaishali in the lead roles. The music was composed by Sivatmikha with cinematography by R. Balaji and editing by Karthikeyan. The film released on 1 June 2018.

== Cast ==
- Lal as George
- Nishanth as Antony
- Vaishali as Maha
- Rekha
- Sampath Ram
- Cheranraj
- Veppam Raja
- Billa Jegan
- Rajkanth
- Shiva
- Rajkumar

== Production ==
The film was marketed as "India’s first claustrophobic science thriller", with the premise of a man being stuck in a car underground. The film was largely shot in Kodaikanal. The film was titled Antony as a tribute to actor Raghuvaran, who immortalised the name in the film Baashha (1995).

== Soundtrack ==
The soundtrack was composed by debutant Sivatmikha, who composed songs for the album aged 19. She was approached by producer Vivek after she had promoted her work on Facebook.

The songs of the film were released in a ceremony held in May 2018.

Antony

Soundtrack album by Sivatmikha
- Released: 2018
- Genre: Soundtrack
- Length: 16:34
- Language: Tamil
- Label: Divo

Sivatmikha chronology
Antony (2018)	Paava Kadhaigal (2020)

No.	Title	Singer(s)	Length
1.	"Antony's Introduction"	Sivam	2:05
2.	"Katrin Kadhal"	Yazin Nizar, Sindhuri Vishal	3:48
3.	"Ponukulle"	Velmurugan	3:38
4.	"Aaradi Singam"	V. M. Mahalingam	3:41
5.	"Thalaradhe"	Sivam	3:22

== Release and reception ==
The film was released on 1 June 2018. A critic from the Times of India gave the film a negative review, though added "the only takeaway for the audience is the somewhat slick cinematography, with a couple of memorable visuals". A reviewer from the Hindustan Times noted "the film with a promising premise loses to bad writing, poor performances by the actors and the sound. The one take away remains the visuals of the film, which are impressive." Further reviews from The New Indian Express and Deccan Chronicle were critical of the film's storyline.
