= Take Diversion =

2022 Tamil language comedy film

- Theatrical release poster
- Directed by: Sivaani Senthil
- Produced by: Suba Senthil
- Starring: Sivakumar Padine Kumar Ramachandran Durairaj John Vijay
- Cinematography: Eeswaran Thangavel
- Edited by: Vidhu Jeeva
- Music by: Jose Franklin
- Production company: Sivaani Studios
- Release date: 20 May 2022
- Country: India
- Language: Tamil

Take Diversion is a 2022 Indian Tamil-language comedy film directed by Sivaani Senthil and starring Sivakumar, Padine Kumar, Ramachandran Durairaj and John Vijay. It was released on 20 May 2022.

== Cast ==
- Ramachandran Durairaj as Chap Bro
- John Vijay as JK
- Sivakumar as Arjun
- Padine Kumar as Yazhini
- George Vijay as Pillar
- Gayatri Rema as Sushma
- Seenivasan Arunachalam as Rakki
- Bala J. Chandran as Michael Cruz
- Arun as Chap Bro Gang Member
- Siva Sanjeev as Chap Bro Gang Member
- Harithbaran as Chap Bro Gang Member
- Elson as Mumbai Don
- Madhuri Watts as Jeejee
- Adeep as Beam Boy
- Ponmana Selvan as Yazhini's friend
- Senthil Kumar as Arjun's brother
- Subha Senthil as Arjun's sister-in-law
- Nethra Senthil as Arjun's niece
- Stephen Raj as Sushma's father
- John Patrick as Sushma's brother
- Jai Geetha as Yazhini Amma
- Vinoth as Traffic Police
- Suganya as JK's wife

== Production ==
The film marked the second venture of director Sivaani Senthil after Kargil (2018). The shoot began in March 2021 with several new actors cast alongside Ramachandran Durairaj, John Vijay and George Vijay. Sivakumar from Koothu-P-Pattarai and television actress Padine Kumar were signed to play the lead roles. Production continued through March and April 2021. A song titled ‘Masthana Mass Minoru’ sung by Deva, with choreography and performance by Sandy, was released in late 2021. A promotional event was held in May 2022 prior to release, with the director noting that K. S. Ravikumar and Prashanth Neel applauded the trailer.

== Reception ==
Thinaboomi critic gave a mixed review. A critic from Thangam TV noted the film had "little plot". A critic from ChennaiVision gave the film a mixed review, noting "the initial stages were enjoyable and then there is a slight slag. However, the second half is good." Critic Malini Mannath wrote "the film works in parts, the genuine fun moments few and far between", adding "what may have seemed amusing on paper seems to have lost some of its punch and fizz while being transitioned to screen".
