= Huliraaya =

- Directed by: Aravind Kaushik
- Written by: Aravind Kaushik
- Story by: Aravind Kaushik
- Produced by: Nagesh Kogilu
- Starring: Balu Nagendra; Divya Uruduga; Chirashree Anchan
- Cinematography: Ravee
- Edited by: Sankesh Virajpete
- Music by: Arjun Ramu
- Production company: SLN Creations
- Distributed by: Paramvah Studios; Pushkar Films
- Release date: 6 October 2017
- Running time: 135 minutes
- Country: India
- Language: Kannada

Huliraaya (Kannada: ಹುಲಿರಾಯ; The Tiger Man) is a 2017 Indian Kannada-language thriller-drama film written and directed by Aravind Kaushik. It is produced by Nagesh Kogilu under the banner of SLN Creations. It features Balu Nagendra and Divya Uruduga in the lead roles. The film tells the story of the protagonist who is born around the wild forest region and his plight in coping up to the pace of the city life. The score and soundtrack for the film is by Arjun Ramu and the cinematography is by Ravee.

The film is distributed by Rakshit Shetty's Paramvah Studios in association with Pushkara Mallikarjunaiah's Pushkar Films. The film was released on 6 October 2017 to positive reviews from critics.

== Cast ==
- Balu Nagendra as Suresaa / Huliraya
- Divya Uruduga as Lachi
- Chirashree Anchan as Malli
- Raghu Pandeshwar
- Renu
- Nagendra Kumar
- Kuldeep
- Sreenath Koundinya
- Pradeep
- Harish Neenasam
- Rakshith Shinde

== Soundtrack ==
Huliraaya

Soundtrack album by Arjun Ramu
- Released: 26 April 2017
- Genre: Feature film soundtrack
- Language: Kannada
- Label: C Music
- Producer: Arjun Ramu

The film's score and soundtrack was composed by Arjun Ramu. The audio was released online on 26 April 2017 and the music rights were acquired by C Music. The soundtrack consists of five songs.

Tracklist
No.	Title	Singer(s)	Length
1.	"Prathiyobba Prajeyallu"	Arjun Ramu, Prajoth D'souza
2.	"Hey Hudugi"	Ganesh Karanth, Sparsha R. K.
3.	"Aane is Da Elephanta"	Arjun Ramu, Balu Nagendra, Tejasvi Haridas
4.	"Valase Bandavare"	Tejasvi Haridas
5.	"Aane is Da Elephanta (remix)"	Bappi Blossom, Manasa Acharya
