= Vamsi Krishna =

Indian actor

- Born: Visakhapatnam, Andhra Pradesh, India
- Occupation: Actor
- Years active: 2004–present

Vamsi Krishna (born 1984) is an Indian actor who predominantly works in Telugu and Tamil films. He made his debut in Gharshana (2004) and went on to play the antagonist in films including Thadaiyara Thaakka (2012) and Ivan Veramathiri (2013).

== Early life ==
He was born in Visakhapatnam, Andhra Pradesh, in 1984. He hails from a family of doctors. Before working in films, he was pursuing a Bachelor of Business Management in London.

== Film career ==
Vamsi Krishna met director Gautham Vasudev Menon on a flight trip from London to India, their conversations lead to them working together, thus began Vamsi Krishna's career as an actor.

The director offered him a supporting role as a police officer in Gharshana (2004) and Krishna allotted 40 days to the project and subsequently decided to make a career in films. He played the lead role in the 2006 Telugu film Oka `V` Chitram alongside Aadhi.It failed at the box-office. He subsequently played roles in films including Darling (2010), Nagavalli (2010), Nenu Naa Rakshasi (2011) and Attarintiki Daredi (2013).

Gautham seems to figure significantly in Vamsi’s film journey. For, strangely enough, it was Gautham’s assistant Magizh Thirumeni who gave him his Kollywood break with Thadaiyara Thaakka (2012). The role got him noticed and A. Sarkunam cast him as a village goon in the Dhanush starrer Naiyaandi (2013). Vamsi Krishna donning the role of villain in Vikram Prabhu's Ivan Veramathiri (2013) directed by M. Saravanan. He is known for his roles in Maan Karate (2014), Thani Oruvan (2015), Kuttram 23 (2017), Ayogya (2019), Yenni Thuniga (2022) and Raakadhan (2023).

== Filmography ==
=== Films ===
Year	Film	Role	Language	Notes
2004	Gharshana	Jagan	Telugu	
2006	Style		Telugu	
2006	Oka `V` Chitram	Santosh Babu	Telugu	
2007	Nava Vasantham	Rajesh	Telugu	
2007	Desamuduru		Telugu	
2008	Krishnarjuna		Telugu	
2008	Pourudu		Telugu	
2009	Ooha Chitram		Telugu	
2010	Darling	Rishi	Telugu	
2010	Nagavalli	Groom	Telugu	
2011	Nenu Naa Rakshasi		Telugu	
2011	Kudirithe Kappu Coffee		Telugu	
2012	Thadaiyara Thaakka	Kumar	Tamil	
2012	Julai	Bank Robber	Telugu	
2013	Parents		Telugu	
2013	Baadshah	Baadshah's accomplice	Telugu	
2013	Naiyaandi	Krishna	Tamil	
2013	Attarintiki Daredi	Praveen Nalla	Telugu	
2013	Ivan Veramathiri	Eeswaran	Tamil	Nominated, Vijay Award for Best Villain
2014	Maan Karate	'Killer' Peter	Tamil	
2015	S/O Satyamurthy	Yogeshwar	Telugu	
2015	Dongaata		Telugu	
2015	Romeo Juliet	Arjun	Tamil	
2015	Thani Oruvan	Vicky	Tamil	
2015	Nenu Sailaja	Babji	Telugu	
2016	Dictator	Minister's son	Telugu	
2016	Chuttalabbai	Police Officer	Telugu	
2017	Muthuramalingam	Ashok Pandian	Tamil	
2017	Kuttram 23	John Matthew	Tamil	
2017	Motta Shiva Ketta Shiva	Sanjay	Tamil	
2017	Mass Leader	Harshath	Kannada	
2017	Veedevadu	Peter	Telugu	
2017	Yaar Ivan	Peter	Tamil	
2017	Kalavu Thozhirchalai	Ram Sanjay	Tamil	
2018	Mannar Vagaiyara	JP, Ilaiyarani's brother	Tamil	
2019	Vantha Rajavathaan Varuven	Praveen	Tamil	
2019	Kodathi Samaksham Balan Vakeel	ACP Ratnavel	Malayalam	
2019	Udgharsha		Kannada	
2019	Ayogya	Sabari	Tamil	
2021	Vakeel Saab	Vamshi	Telugu	
2021	Sabhaapathy	Selvam	Tamil	
2022	The Legend	Munna	Tamil	
2022	Vattam	Gowtham	Tamil	
2022	Yenni Thuniga	Madhan	Tamil	
2022	Aattral	Jo	Tamil	
2023	Raakadhan	Ajmal	Tamil	
2023	Dhruva Natchathiram	Unknown	Tamil	Unreleased
2024	Vasco Da Gama	Kovarthan	Tamil	
2024	Max	Narasimha	Kannada	
2026	Magudam	Malli	Tamil	

=== Television ===
Year	Title	Role	Network	Language
2019	Queen	Chaitanya Reddy	MX Player	Tamil
2021	11th Hour	Siddharth Singh	Aha	Telugu
2022	Dharavi Bank	Shiva	MX Player	Hindi
2023	Sweet Kaaram Coffee	Vikram	Amazon Prime Video	Tamil
2025	Arabia Kadali	Sekhar	Amazon Prime Video	Telugu
