= Kombai, Tamil Nadu =

Kombai
- Town
- Location in Tamil Nadu, India
- Coordinates: 9°50′53.189″N 77°17′46.371″E
- Country: India
- State: Tamil Nadu
- District: Theni

Government
  - Body: Tamil Nadu Legislative Assembly
- Elevation: 399 m (1,309 ft)

Population (2001)
  - Total: 12,820

Languages
  - Official: Tamil
- Time zone: UTC+5:30 (IST)
- Postal code: 625522

Kombai is a panchayat town in Theni District in the Indian state of Tamil Nadu, in the foot hills of the Western Ghats.

== Geography ==
Kombai is located at 9.83°N 77.32°E.

=== Topography ===
Kombai has an average elevation of 399 metres (1,309 feet). The village is situated near Western Ghats and is surrounded by mountains: North Side- Pannaipuram, East Side-Salamalai hills, West Side-Kerala border hills, and South Side-Uthamapalayam town. Two mountain called Ramakkal mettu hills situated in west side & Salamali hills situated in east side.

== Demographics ==
=== Population ===
As of 2001 India census, Kombai had a population of 12,820. Males constitute 50% of the population and females 50%. Kombai has an average literacy rate of 64%, higher than the national average of 59.5%: male literacy is 72%, and female literacy is 65%. In Kombai, 10% of the population is under 6 years of age.

== Transport ==
The Bodinayakkanur railway station is the nearest railway station to Kombai.

== Notable people ==
- Ramachandran Durairaj - actor
