= Pandrikku Nandri Solli =

2022 Indian film

- OTT Streaming poster
- Directed by: Bala Aran
- Written by: Bala Aran
- Produced by: Vignesh Selvaraj
- Starring: Nishanth; Vijay Sathya; Balaji Rathinam; Joe Malloori
- Cinematography: Vignesh Selvaraj
- Edited by: Ram; Sathiesh
- Music by: Suren Vikhash
- Production company: Head Media Works
- Distributed by: SonyLIV
- Release date: 4 February 2022
- Country: India
- Language: Tamil

Pandrikku Nandri Solli (transl. Saying thank you to the pig) is a 2022 Indian Tamil-language black comedy film directed by Bala Aran and produced by Vignesh Selvaraj under the banner Head Media Works. The film stars Joe Malloori and newcomers Nishanth, Vijay Sathya, and Balaji Rathinam in the lead roles. The film's music is composed by Suren Vikhash, with cinematography handled by Vignesh Selvaraj himself and editing done by duo Ram and Sathiesh. The film was released via OTT platform Sony LIV on 4 February 2022.

The film was titled from a phrase of a Tamil riddle, and it became popular after a dialogue used by Vadivelu in Imsai Arasan 23rd Pulikecei.

== Cast ==
- Nishanth as Devaraj
- Vijay Sathya
- Balaji Rathinam
- Joe Malloori
- Viyan
- Chella as Jaffer
- Baskar
- Damodaran
- Auto Chandran

== Release ==
The film was released via OTT platform Sony LIV on 4 February 2022.

== Reception ==
The film was released via OTT platform Sony LIV on 4 February 2022. M Suganth Critic from the Times of India gave 2 stars out of 5 stars and noted that "A Film With Interesting Ideas but Lacklustre Execution ". Maalaimalar critic said " The plot of the film revolves around a rare treasure hunt in Tamil cinema.". Dinamalar critic gave a mixture of review
