= Raakadhan =

- Release poster
- Directed by: Dinesh Kalaiselvan
- Written by: Dinesh Kalaiselvan
- Produced by: MAG Baskar; Rani Henry Samuvel
- Starring: Vamsi Krishna; Riyaz Khan; Dinesh Kalaiselvan
- Cinematography: Manas Babhu Dr
- Edited by: Gopikrishna
- Music by: A Praveen Kumar
- Production company: Marudham Productions
- Release date: 21 July 2023
- Country: India
- Language: Tamil

Raakadhan is a 2023 Indian Tamil-language crime thriller film written and directed by Dinesh Kalaiselvan. The film stars Vamsi Krishna, Riyaz Khan, Dinesh Kalaiselvan and Vignesh Baskar in the lead roles. The film was produced by MAG Baskar and Rani Henry Samuvel under the banner of Marudham Productions.

== Cast ==
- Vamsi Krishna as Ajmal
- Riyaz Khan as Austin
- Dinesh Kalaiselvan as Alex
- Vignesh Baskar as Arjun
- Gayatri Rema as Ananya
- Chaams as Manimaaran
- Sanjana Singh as Sanjana
- Nizhalgal Ravi as Ravi Varman

== Production ==
Audio launch of the film was held on 7 July 2023. The first single of the film was released by Premgi Amaren and Saindhavi .The film was released 21 July 2023 in theatres

== Reception ==
A critic from Dina Thanthi wrote that "Dinesh Kalaichelvan is a talented director who shows the dark sides of the problems faced by men in the modeling industry in an interesting and lively way in friendship, love and thriller." Dinakaran critic gave mixed review.
