= Seesaw (film) =

2025 Tamil thriller film

- Theatrical release poster
- Directed by: Guna Subramaniam
- Written by: Guna Subramaniam
- Produced by: K. Senthilvelan
- Starring: Natty Subramaniam; Nishanth Russo; Padine Kumar
- Cinematography: Manivannan; Perumal
- Edited by: Wilsi J Sasi
- Music by: Charan Kumar
- Production company: Vidiyal Studios
- Release date: 3 January 2025
- Running time: 134 minutes
- Country: India
- Language: Tamil

Seesaw is a 2025 Indian Tamil-language crime thriller film written and directed by Guna Subramaniam, starring Natty Subramaniam and Nishanth Russo in the lead roles and Padine Kumar as the female lead. The film is produced by K. Senthilvelan under his Vidiyal Studios banner.

Seesaw was released in theatres on 3 January 2025.

== Cast ==
- Natty Subramaniam as Inspector Mugilan
- Nishanth Russo as Aadhavan
- Padine Kumar as Malavika
- Nizhalgal Ravi as Police commissioner
- Jeeva Ravi as Krishnamurti
- R. Aravindraj as Malavika's father
- Adhesh Bala as S.I. Kamalakannan

== Production ==
The film stars cinematographer turned actor Natty Subramaniam who last appeared in Sorgavaasal (2024) alongside Nishant Russo and Padine Kumar as the lead actors. The film is directed by Guna Subramaniam and produced by K. Senthilvelan under his Vidiyal Studios banner. The film also stars Nizhalgal Ravi, Jeeva Ravi, R. Aravindraj, Adhesh Bala and others in supporting roles. The technical team consists of Manivannan and Perumal as the cinematographers, Wilsi J Sasi as the editor and Charan Kumar as the music composer.

== Music ==
The music is composed by Charan Kumar. The first single "Naane Sivan" got released on 22 December 2024.

Track listing
| No. | Title | Lyrics | Singer(s) | Length |
|---|---|---|---|---|
| 1. | "Kanale" | K. Senthilvelan | Haricharan, Gayathry Rajiv |
| 2. | "Pongalo Pongal" | Mahakavi Barathiyaar, K.Senthilvelan | V. M. Mahalingam |
| 3. | "Naane Sivan" | Guna Subramaniam | Diwakar |
| 4. | "Miruga Gunangal" | K.Senthilvelan | Udumalai Pravin |

== Release ==
Seesaw released in theatres on 3 January 2025.

== Reception ==
A critic of Maalai Malar gave 2.5/5 stars, praising the performances and the suspense till the climax, but criticized the logic mistakes and background score. Abhinav Subramanian of Times of India gave 2/5 stars and wrote "Seesaw simply doesn’t deliver the thrills it promises. It’s a forgettable entry in a crowded genre, unlikely to leave a lasting impression. A swing and a miss."
