= Thirunaal =

2016 Indian film by P. S. Ramnath

- Directed by: P. S. Ramnath
- Written by: P. S. Ramnath
- Produced by: M. Senthil Kumar
- Starring: Jiiva; Nayantara
- Cinematography: Mahesh Muthuswami
- Edited by: V. T. Vijayan; T. S. Jay
- Music by: Srikanth Deva
- Production company: Kodhandapani Films
- Distributed by: Sri Thenandal Films
- Release date: 5 August 2016
- Country: India
- Language: Tamil

Thirunaal (transl. Holy day) is a 2016 Indian Tamil-language action drama film written and directed by P. S. Ramnath and produced by M. Senthil Kumar. The film stars Jiiva and Nayanthara, while Sharath Lohitashwa, Karunas, Joe Malloori, and G. Marimuthu play supporting roles. The music was composed by Srikanth Deva. The film was released on 5 August 2016.

== Plot ==
"Blade" Ganesh (Jiiva) is a henchman for a local don, Naaga (Sharath Lohitashwa), and is loyal to him without any reason. Blade is ready to go to any extent for the sake of Naaga. However, Naaga views Blade just as a henchman and uses him to run his local mafia. Vithya (Nayanthara) is the daughter of a local factory owner (Joe Malloori), who is also a friend of Naaga. She falls for Ganesh after he saves her from a few goons. Vithya's father arranges her wedding to another man, but everyone learns about the love affair between Vithya and Blade, which creates animosity between Naaga and Vithya's father. Naaga does not want Blade to marry anyone, fearing Blade might leave him post-marriage, which could weaken his mafia business. Blade overhears Naaga's conversation, understands his true intention, and feels bad for blindly trusting Naaga all these days, leading to his transformation into a good human being.

Vithya's father decides to move out of town with his family and asks Naaga to return the money he owes, but Naaga refuses and betrays Vithya's father. Blade comes to his rescue, and with his help, Vithya's father files a complaint at a police station, after which Naaga returns the money. Naaga decides to kill Blade for moving away from him. Vithya's father understands Blade's transformation and agrees to get Vithya married to him. The day before Blade's wedding, Naaga's henchmen hit Blade. Blade decides to take revenge and kills Naaga, following which he surrenders in court. He is released after a few years and marries Vithya.

== Cast ==
- Jiiva as "Blade" Ganesh
- Nayantara as Vithya
- Sharath Lohitashwa as Naaga
- Karunas as Mani
- Joe Malloori as Vithya's father
- Rama as Vithya's mother
- G. Marimuthu as Inspector Rajaram
- Gopinath as ASP Pugazhenthi
- Ramdoss as Tips
- V. I. S. Jayapalan as Durai
- Jangiri Madhumitha as Vithya's driver
- Meenakshi as Prema
- Sujatha Sivakumar as Vasuki
- D. R. K. Kiran as Ganesh's friend
- Ramachandran Durairaj as Naaga's henchman
- Thirumurugan
- Cheranraj
- Sujibala
- Usilampatti Perumayi
- Supergood Subramani as Principal's friend
- Bava Lakshmanan as Nadhaswaram player
- Vazhakku En Muthuraman

== Production ==
The film was first reported in November 2014, when Jiiva had agreed terms to work on a village-centric film directed by P. S. Ramnath, who had previously made Ambasamudram Ambani (2010). Nayanthara signed on to appear in the film in April 2015, collaborating with Jiiva for the second time after E (2006). Srikanth Deva was confirmed as the film's music director. The film began its first schedule in Kumbakonam in May 2015 at a grand Agraharam set. The films trailer was released on for Diwali. The shooting for the film was completed by the end of August 2015 and the post production work thereafter started.

== Soundtrack ==
Thirunaal

Soundtrack album by Srikanth Deva
- Released: 26 March 2016
- Genre: Feature film soundtrack
- Length: 26:17
- Language: Tamil
- Producer: Srikanth Deva

Srikanth Deva chronology
Angali Pangali (2016)	Thirunaal (2016)	Ilami (2016)

The music was composed by Srikanth Deva. The lyrics written by Muthu Vijayan.

All lyrics are written by Muthu Vijayan.

Track listing
No.	Title	Singer(s)	Length
1.	"Hey Chinna Chinna"	D. Imman, Velmurugan	4.32
2.	"Karisa Kaattu"	Abhay Jodhpurkar	1.34
3.	"Ore Oru Vaanam"	Shakthisree Gopalan, Mahalakshmi Iyer
4.	"Pazhaya Soru"	Ranjith, Namitha	5.09
5.	"Thandhaiyum Yaaro"	S. Janaki	2.33
6.	"Thittadhe Thittadhe"	Grace Karunas

== Reception ==
Behindwoods rated the film 1.75 out of 5 stating "Had the film come ten years ago, it might have worked a little better." Baradwaj Rangan of the Hindu called it " Nicely made, but still pretty generic" in his review.
