= Sujith Shankar =

Indian film actor

Sujith Shanker
- Education: National School of Drama, New Delhi
- Parents: E. M. Sreedharan; Dr. M. P. Yamuna
- Relatives: E. M. S. Namboodiripad (grandfather)

Sujith Shanker is an Indian actor, known for his works in theater and the Malayalam and Tamil films. He trained under Kavalam Narayana Panicker at the Sopanam Institute of Performing Arts (1999–2002) and subsequently at the National School of Drama (2002–2005) in New Delhi. Here, he worked with and studied under the likes of Anuradha Kapur, Abhilash Pillai, Khaled Tyabji, Robin Das, Kirti Jain, M. K. Raina, C. R. Jambe, Anamika Haksar and Adil Hussain.

Helen, written and performed by Shanker and directed by Abhilash Pillai was performed at Tokyo and Seoul as part of Performing Women: 3 Reinterpretations from Greek Tragedy hosted by the Japan Foundation as part of a joint work with artists from India, Iran, Uzbekistan, and Japan, in 2007 and 2009.

== Career ==
He was noticed in Rajeev Ravi's Malayalam film Njan Steve Lopez and is notable for his villainous roles in Malayalam cinema. He got his breakthrough with Dileesh Pothan's Maheshinte Prathikaaram. He also performed at the UNESCO International Theater Festival in Peru in 2010.

== Personal life ==
Sujith is the grandson of E. M. S. Namboodiripad. His mother, Dr. M. P. Yamuna (1948–2001), was a gynecologist and his father E. M. Sreedharan (1947–2002) was a chartered accountant and politician. His brother, Ameet Parameswaran, is Asst. Professor, Dept. of Arts and Aesthetics at Jawaharlal Nehru University. He is a PhD holder in Theatre from the University of Hyderabad.

== Filmography ==
Key
†	Denotes films that have not yet been released

- All films are in Malayalam language unless otherwise noted.

Year	Title	Role	Notes
2009	Laadli Laila (The Virgin Goat)		Debut; Hindi film
2014	Njan Steve Lopez	Hari	
2016	Maheshinte Prathikaaram	Jimson Augustine	
2017	Ezra	Rabbi Markes	
2017	C/O Saira Banu	Sebastian	
2017	Comrade In America	Manoj	
2017	Hadiyya		
2017	Gold Coins		
2018	Ankarajyathe Jimmanmar	Benjamin Lukose	
2018	Eeda	Karipally Dineshan	
2018	Aabhaasam	Stranger	
2018	Oru Kuprasidha Payyan	SP Simon George	
2019	Nerkonda Paarvai	Gavaskar	Tamil Debut
2019	Moothon	Latheef	Bilingual (Hindi, Malayalam)
2022	Pyali		
2022	Maha	Mathew	Tamil film
2022	Cuttputlli	Maths Teacher	Hindi film
2022	Saudi Vellakka	Sathar	
2022	Kakkipada	Mohanan	
2023	Charles Enterprises		
2023	RDX: Robert Dony Xavier	Jaison	
2024	Rasavathi	Inspector Parasuraj "Parasu"	Tamil film
2024	Thalavan	Joshy	
2024	Gangs of Sukumara Kurup		
2024	Pani	Saji	
2025	Identity	ATCO Sudev Anand	
2025	Retro	Freddie Milton	Tamil film
2025	Surrender	Kanagu	
2025	Kombuseevi	DSP Karan Dogra	Tamil film
2026	Jailer 2	Mukund	Tamil film
