= Varshini Venkat =

Indian actress

- Born: Chennai, Tamil Nadu
- Occupation: Actress
- Years active: 2022–present

Varshini Venkat is an Indian actress who acts mainly in Tamil television and films.

== Career ==
Varshini started her acting career in 2022, in the Tamil soap opera Kannana Kanne which aired on Sun TV in which she played a supporting role. In 2024, she participated as a wild card contestant in the reality show Bigg Boss 8 which aired on Star Vijay; she was evicted on Day 49. In 2025, Varshini starred in a few films such as Sotta Sotta Nanaiyuthu where she played the lead, followed by Devil's Double Next Level and Lara.

== Arrest ==
On 24 September 2026, Varshini was arrested by Tamil Nadu Police for allegedly assaulting and threatening a man, along with her associates, and extorting ₹5.5 lakh from him in Guindy, Chennai.

== Filmography ==
=== Film ===
List of Varshini Venkat film credits
| Year | Film | Role |
|---|---|---|
| 2025 | Sotta Sotta Nanaiyuthu | Shruti |
| 2025 | Devil's Double Next Level | Lily |
| 2025 | Lara | |
| 2026 | Mookuthi Amman 2 | Landlord's bride |

=== Television ===
List of Varshini Venkat television credits
| Year | Show | Role | Channel |
|---|---|---|---|
| 2020–2023 | Kannana Kanne | Inspector Poonguzhali | Sun TV |
| 2024 | Bigg Boss 8 | Contestant | Star Vijay |
