= Sevarkkodi =

2012 Indian film by R. Subramanian

- Directed by: R. Subramanian
- Produced by: Maharanth
- Starring: Arun Balaji; Bhama; Pawan
- Music by: C.Sathya
- Release date: 9 March 2012
- Country: India
- Language: Tamil

Sevarkkodi is a 2012 Indian Tamil-language romantic drama film directed by R. Subramanian, starring Arun Balaji and Bhama and produced by Maharnth and Anand Reddy under Paneeyri Pictures banner. The film released on 9 March 2012 to negative reviews.

== Cast ==
- Arun Balaji as Bala
- Bhama as Valli
- Pawan as Kali
- Manimaran as Soosai

== Production ==
The famous festival Thiruchendur Soorasamharam was included in the film's shoot.

== Soundtrack ==
Sevarkkodi

Soundtrack album by C. Sathya
- Released: 25 January 2012
- Recorded: 2012
- Genre: Soundtrack
- Length: 26:31
- Label: Think Music India
- Producer: C. Sathya

C. Sathya chronology
Engeyum Eppodhum (2011)	Sevarkkodi (2012)	Ponmaalai Pozhudhu (2012)

The music was composed by C. Sathya and released on Think Music India.

All lyrics are written by Vairamuthu.

Track-List
No.	Title	Singer(s)	Length
1.	"Velava Velava"	Kovai Kamala, SuVi, Vinaya	4:12
2.	"Puraavai"	Vijay Prakash	4:34
3.	"Kambi Mathappu"	M. L. R. Karthikeyan	4:00
4.	"Nenje Nenje"	Sathyan, Priya Himesh	3:25
5.	"Meene Vinmeeney"	Balram, Mathangi Jagdish	4:00
6.	"Vettayai"	Vinaya	4:34
7.	"Hoodha Beat"	Sanjay	1:46
Total length:			26:31

== Release ==
A critic from Behindwoods.com wrote that "Sevarkkodi is a fairly acceptable product that has its own inherent limitations. No point complaining about the production values here. But, the movie could have definitely done with a script that engaged constantly instead of sporadically. Also, a more performance by the male lead have shown a great work which made things much more interesting".
