= Yazhini =

- Logo
- Genre: Soap opera
- Written by: Raadan Team
- Directed by: Sundar K. Vijayan
- Starring: Nikila; Dhinesh; Shravan; Dev; Asha Rani; Divya; Mithun; Shabnam; Vicky
- Theme music composer: C. Sathya (Title Song); Hari (Background Score)
- Country of origin: India
- Original language: Tamil
- No. of seasons: 5
- No. of episodes: 244

Production
- Producer: Radhika
- Running time: approx. 20-22 minutes per episode
- Production company: Radaan Mediaworks

Original release
- Network: IBC Tamil
- Release: 20 November 2015 – 2 September 2016

Yazhini is a 2015 - 2016 Tamil-language soap opera that aired Monday through Friday on IBC Tamil from 20 November 2015 to 2 September 2016 at 7:30PM for 244 episodes, starred Nikila, Dhinesh, Shravan, Dev, Asha Rani and Divya.

The show was produced by Radaan MediaworksRadhika and director by Sundar K. Vijayan. The drama about Sri Lanka Tamil refugees and their struggles in Tamil Nadu. Yazhini, a Sri Lankan refugee, who lives with her younger sister and brother in her aunt's home. This story pinned around her life.

== Cast ==
- Nikila-yazhini
- Dhinesh
- Shravan
- Dev
- Asha Rani
- Divya
- Vasanthi Vishwanathan
- Thanalaskhmi
- Ashritha
- Southarya Shetty
- Denakaran
- Veera
- Vinoth
- Mithun
- Harish
- Santhosh
- Nagaraj

== International broadcast ==
- In Sri Lanka Tamil Channel on Shakthi TV. It airs Monday through Friday at 06:00PM (SST) with Sinhala Subtitle.
