= Ramachandran Durairaj =

Indian actor

- Born: Kombai, Tamil Nadu, India
- Other names: Rams, Ramachandran Durairaj, Raams
- Occupations: Actor; producer
- Years active: 2010–present

Ramachandran Durairaj is an Indian actor who has appeared in Tamil language films. After working as an associate director, he made his breakthrough as an actor with a negative role in Suseenthiran's Naan Mahaan Alla (2010). He later won acclaim for his supporting role in Aramm (2017).

== Career ==
Ramachandran moved to Chennai from Theni in 2000 and alongside his day job, he had a keen interest in photography. He became acquainted with director S. R. Prabhakaran and through their association, he became interested in working in the Tamil film industry as a cinematographer. He however began working as an assistant director in the television series Kolangal, and subsequently networked his way into appearing in acting roles in films. He briefly worked as Vijay Milton's assistant cinematographer in Vennila Kabadi Kuzhu (2009), before playing a key role in Suseenthiran's Naan Mahaan Alla (2010), as an antagonist. In 2014, Ramachandran appeared in two films which garnered him attention. Karthik Subbaraj's Jigarthanda and H. Vinoth's Sathuranga Vettai both saw the actor playing a henchman, who moves away from his violent personality.

His friendship with director Gopi Nainar meant that he was cast in the social drama film Aramm (2017), which had Nayanthara in the lead role. Ramachandran played the secondary lead character of a farmer whose daughter becomes stuck in an uncovered well, and paired opposite actress Sunu Lakshmi. The film won critical acclaim, with Ramachandran winning acclaim from critics for his performance.

== Filmography ==
Year	Film	Role	Notes
2010	Aval Peyar Thamizharasi		
2010	Naan Mahaan Alla	Pei Babu	
2014	Sathuranga Vettai	Thilagar	
2014	Jigarthanda	Rasu	
2014	Vadacurry		
2015	Agathinai		
2015	Indru Netru Naalai	Kuzhandaivelu's henchman	
2015	Eetti	Isaac	
2016	Vil Ambu	Logu	
2016	Aviyal		Acted in segment Eli
2016	Iraivi	Mahesh	
2016	Thirunaal	Naaga's henchman	
2016	Kollidam		
2016	Atti		
2017	Ivan Yarendru Therikiratha	Bombay Boys member	
2017	Theru Naaigal	Ramu	
2017	Aramm	Pulendhiran	
2017	Balloon	Henchman	
2018	Nagesh Thiraiyarangam	Bar owner	
2018	Merlin		
2018	Iravukku Aayiram Kangal	Guru	
2018	Marainthirunthu Paarkum Marmam Enna	Jeeva	
2019	Petta	Gnanam's henchman	
2019	Viswasam	Police constable	
2019	V1	Agni's assistant	
2020	Soorarai Pottru	Arivu	
2021	Jagame Thandhiram	Ram	
2021	Rudra Thandavam		
2022	Mahaan	Manikkam	
2022	Payanigal Gavanikkavum		
2022	Take Diversion	Chap	
2023	Nanpakal Nerathu Mayakkam	Shanmugham	Malayalam film
2023	Bakasuran		
2023	Kuttram Purinthal		
2023	Thuritham		
2023	Dhillu Irundha Poradu		
2024	Manjummel Boys	Dominic	Malayalam film
2024	Oru Thavaru Seidhal		
2024	Hit List		
2024	Rocket Driver	Savarimuthu	
2024	Silent		
2025	Retro	Ramachandran	
2025	Maargan	Murugavel	
2025	Madharas Mafia Company		
2025	Friday		
2025	Revolver Rita	Ponraj	
2025	Retta Thala		
2025	Kombuseevi	Konda Reddy's accomplice	
2026	Karuppu	Priest	
2026	Jana Nayagan	Vetri's Assistant	
2026	Mandaadi		
2026	Dorothy		
2026	Jailer 2	Durai	

=== Television ===
Year	Title	Role	Channel	Notes
2003–2009	Kolangal	Maddy's friend	Sun TV	
2024	Snakes and Ladders	Blade	Amazon Prime Video	
2025	Nadu Center	Chandru's father	JioHotstar	
