= Heart Beat (TV series) =

Indian TV series

- Poster
- Genre: Medical drama; Romantic drama
- Written by: Deepak Sundarrajan
- Directed by: Deepak Sundarrajan; Adbul Kabeez; Chidambaram Manivannan
- Starring: Deepa Balu; Anumol; Karthik Kumar; Charukesh M; Ashwathy Agnihothri; Sabareesh
- Narrated by: Deepa Balu
- Composer: Saran Raghavan
- Country of origin: India
- Original language: Tamil
- No. of seasons: 3
- No. of episodes: 268

Production
- Executive producer: RJ Shyam Sundar
- Producers: Padmini Velu; Rajavelu
- Production locations: Chennai; Bangalore
- Cinematography: Regimel Surya Thomas; K. Santhosa Pandi
- Editors: Vignesh Arjun; Sreedhar M; Srinivasan K
- Running time: 18-30 minutes
- Production company: A Tele Factory

Original release
- Network: JioHotstar
- Release: 8 March 2024 – present

Heart Beat is an Indian Tamil-language medical drama series starring Deepa Balu in the leading titular role, alongside Anumol, Karthik Kumar, Charukesh M, Ashwathy Agnihothri, Sabareesh and others.

The series is written by Deepak Sundarrajan and directed by Deepak Sundarrajan, Adbul Kabeez and Chidambaram Manivannan for JioHotstar. The series is similar to the popular US drama series, New Amsterdam and Grey's Anatomy. It focuses on the personal and professional lives of surgical interns, residents, and attendings at the fictional RK Multispeciality Hospitals. It premiered on JioHotstar on 8 March 2024 and also dubbed simultaneously in Telugu, Kannada, Malayalam and Hindi languages.

The first season of the series premiered on 8 March 2024 and ended on 23 August 2024 with 100 episodes. It also aired on Star Vijay from 24 November 2024 on every Sunday.

The second season of this series has started premiering from 22 May 2025 and ended on 6 November 2025.

The third season of this series premiered on 30 July 2026.

== Series overview ==
Series	Episodes	Originally released	
Series	Episodes	First released	Last released
1	100	8 March 2024	23 August 2024
2	100	22 May 2025	6 November 2025
3	68	30 July 2026	TBA

== Synopsis ==
=== Season 1 ===
The series follows the life of Reena, the estranged daughter of renowned general surgeon Radhi, starting from her acceptance into the surgical residency program at the fictional RK Hospitals. The hospital was established by RK, whose son Arjun becomes Reena's love interest. During her time as an intern, Reena works alongside fellow interns Teju, Naveen, Rocky, Guna, and senior residents Anitha and Ravi, who each struggle to balance their personal lives with hectic schedules and stressful residency requirements. During their internship, they are overseen by Dr. Radhi, whose life complicates after Reena is revealed to be her daughter from her past life.

=== Season 2 ===
Season 2 opens with Radhi adjusting to life outside the hospital after stepping away from her duties, while Reena struggles under the new leadership of Arjun, the recently appointed CEO. Encouraged by her children and her own sense of purpose, Radhi reclaims her role. The story follows Radhi and Reena dealing with their past, fuelled by the arrival of Reena's biological father and Radhi's past love interest, Dr. Vijay. Soon, both Reena and Vijay get to know the truth about each other but very soon the former meets with an accident.

=== Season 3 ===
Season 3 opens with a one-year time jump following the life-altering accident that left Reena in a coma, while Ravi returns to find the hospital under intense corporate management shifts. Waking up to face a painful recovery process, Radhi struggles with immense self-doubt regarding her surgical abilities under Manasa's harsh leadership style. The story follows Reena and Dr. Vijay relocating to Bangalore to adjust to a new environment, fuelled by the arrival of an unexpected visitor and a new specialist cardiology duo. Soon, Dr. Radhi steps into a brand-new role to navigate her strained biological connection with Reena, but very soon a fearless new arrival, Dr. Aradhana, triggers fresh internal friction during high-stakes medical emergencies.

== Cast ==
List indicators

This section includes characters who will appear or have appeared in Heart Beat characters.

- An empty grey cell indicates the character was not in the film, or that the character's official presence has not yet been confirmed.
- ^{Y} indicates a younger version of the character.

Cast and character appearances in Heartbeat (TV series)
Actor	Character	Description	Season 1	Season 2	Season 3
Deepa Balu	Dr. Reena Vijay	A compassionate and resilient surgical resident who is the biological daughter of renowned surgeons Radhi and Vijay. She is the closest friend of Rocky, with whom she shares a special bond that develops throughout the series, and is also friends with Teju, Guna, and Naveen. She is also the love interest of Arjun, navigating her career while trying to reconnect with her parents and the complexities of their strained relationship. She often finds herself in trouble for prioritizing her patients' well-being over strict rules. In the second season, she becomes a surgical resident and discovers the truth about her biological father, Vijay, before meeting with a severe accident at the end of the season. Following a one-year coma, she wakes up in the third season, resigns from R.K. Hospitals, and moves to Bangalore with her father to work as a chief resident at AM Hospital, before eventually returning to Chennai when he becomes CEO of R.K. Hospital.	Main	Main	Main
Kanishka Vijaykumar ^{Y}	Dr. Reena Vijay		Guest	Guest	
Baby Safa ^{Y}	Dr. Reena Vijay		Guest	Guest	
Anumol	Dr. Radhi Thiyagarajan	Reena’s biological mother, a strict and workaholic chief surgeon known for her professional brilliance, who struggles to balance her career with a complicated personal life and a strained relationship with her past. In the second season, after initially stepping away from her duties, she reclaims her role at the hospital and confronts her past following Vijay's arrival, which causes major turmoil in her marriage with Dev and leads her to temporarily step away from her duties. In the third season, after overcoming self-doubt regarding her surgical abilities under Manasa's harsh leadership, she steps into a new role handling both the ER and Gynecology departments.	Main	Main	Main
Sachana Namidass ^{Y}	Dr. Radhi Thiyagarajan			Guest	
Charukesh M	Dr. Arjun	The supportive and loving son of the hospital's founder, who becomes the CEO and Reena's boyfriend, navigating professional challenges while being a steadfast presence in her life. At the end of the second season, after Reena meets with a severe accident, he sells his hospital shares to the Rupiter Group to fund her treatment and steps down as CEO. In the third season, he returns as a medical student to clear his arrears, where he meets Madhu and briefly enters into a relationship with her before they eventually break up. Later in the season, after the hospital fails to meet its financial targets, he reclaims the shares and appoints Vijay as the new CEO.	Main	Main	Main
Karthik Kumar	Dr. Vijay	Reena's biological father and Radhi's former lover, whose unexpected return adds complexity to the lives of the two main characters. He initially comes to R.K. Hospital from Mumbai as a medical investigator before staying on as a senior doctor. He becomes the Head of Surgery and grows closer to Reena, though the public revelation of his past with Radhi and his paternity causes major turmoil at the hospital; following Reena's severe accident and recovery, he leaves R.K. Hospital to support her. In the third season, following Reena's recovery from her coma, he relocates with her to Bangalore to work at AM Hospital, where he develops an immediate spark with his new upstairs neighbour, Anu. After Arjun reclaims the hospital's shares from the Rupiter Group and Manasa steps down, Arjun offers him the role of CEO, which he accepts before returning to Chennai with Reena.	Mentioned	Main	Main
Roshan A ^{Y}	Dr. Vijay		Mentioned	Guest	Guest
Sabareesh	Dr. Ramakrishna "Rocky"	A lighthearted and humorous medical intern who provides a comedic touch and much-needed relief to the intense atmosphere of the hospital. He is Reena's closest friend, with whom she shares all her emotions and secrets, and was previously in a relationship with Charu. He becomes a senior resident and Sindhu's boyfriend in the third season.	Main	Main	Main
Yogalakshmi	Dr. Tejashri "Teju"	A relatable medical intern and a Love interest to Naveen and a friend to Reena, Rocky, and Guna, who struggles with the immense pressure of her residency while trying to maintain a normal personal life.	Main	Main	Mentioned
RG Ram	Dr. Naveen	MNM's estranged younger son; A fellow medical intern. He is often part of the group of interns, navigating the challenges of their residency and personal lives, and a love interest to Teju and a friend of Reena, Rocky, Guna	Main	Main	Mentioned
Padine Kumar	Dr. Anitha	Another senior medical intern. She is a versatile and dedicated professional who often works closely with Dr. Ravi. Her character goes through a "rollercoaster" of emotional shifts throughout the series.	Main	Main	
Guru Lakshman	Dr. Ravi	A senior intern at the hospital. He is often seen alongside fellow senior intern Dr. Anitha, and their close relationship is a topic of speculation among the other interns. He is a dedicated professional but can be emotionally vulnerable, as shown when he freezes during a critical surgery.	Main	Mentioned	Guest
Sarvhaa	Dr. Guna	Another medical intern who is a friend of Reena, Naveen, Teju, and a close friend of Rocky and dated Dr. Anitha in Season 2. He is depicted as a supportive and reliable member of the intern group.	Main	Main	Mentioned
Mohan Raman	Thiyagarajan / "Thayagu"	Radhi's father and Reena, Divya and Sid's grandfather	Guest	Main	Main
Akshathaa Ajit	Dr. Nilofer	A medical intern who joins R.K. Hospital in the second season, becoming close friends with Rocky and later entering into a relationship with Dr. Kiran after calling off her engagement. Although she does not appear in the third season, Kiran later reveals that the two broke up following an argument.		Main	Mentioned
Shivaraman M	Dr. Kiran	A medical intern who joins R.K. Hospital in the second season, becoming close friends with Rocky and entering into a relationship with Dr. Nilofer. In the third season, he reveals that they broke up following an argument, and he later rejoins R.K. Hospital after the Rupiter Group's departure.		Main	Recurring
Abdool Lee	Dr. Kamalakannan "Kamal"	A doctor at R.K. Hospital and Amaya's love interest who is initially confused by her identical twin sister, Abinaya, leading to a key moment where Amaya's lies are exposed.		Main	Mentioned
Roshni	Amaya	A nurse at R.K. Hospital and Dr. Kamalakannan's love interest; a mysterious character with a hidden identity whose lies about her twin sister are eventually exposed, causing major plot twists.		Main	Mentioned
Roshni	Abinaya	Amaya's unemployed twin sister, who briefly impersonates her at the hospital before their secret is uncovered.		Recurring	
Premika Sekar	Dr. Sindhuja "Sindhu"	Dr. Kiran's timid younger sister who starts out as a final-year MBBS student in the second season and joins R.K. Hospital as a medical intern in the third season, where she is in a relationship with Dr.Rocky.		Recurring	Main
Ashwathy Agnihothri	Manasa	MNM's daughter and a psychologist who returns and informs her brother Madhan that she wants the hospital back, revealing a past connection to it and an agenda of her own. In the third season, she becomes the CEO of R.K. Hospital after the Rupiter Group takes over, but later undergoes a change of heart amid financial strain and pressure from the group, eventually approaching Arjun to reclaim their shares before resigning as CEO.	Mentioned	Main	Recurring
Uma Padmanabhan	Dr. Saranya	The new chief surgeon of R.K. Hospital, a friendly and reliable doctor who always strives to maintain peace and harmony among hospital members.			Main
Gayathrie Shankar	Anu (Aarthi) Vinayak	A fashion designer and boutique owner in Bangalore who moves into the flat above Vijay and Reena's in the third season, quickly developing a close bond with Vijay. She is also Dr. Aaradhana's estranged elder sister.			Main
Deepthie Orientelu	Dr. Aaradhana (Ammu)	A senior resident at R.K. Hospital who is mysterious and reserved yet brave, rarely letting anyone into her world as she carefully guards her emotions and secrets. A former drug peddler and the estranged younger sister of Anu (Aarthi), she is also a close friend of Dr. Vijay and confesses her feelings to him, though he does not reciprocate them as he has feelings for Anu.			Main
Nivahsni Shyam ^{Y}	Dr. Aaradhana (Ammu)	A senior resident at R.K. Hospital who is mysterious and reserved yet brave, rarely letting anyone into her world as she carefully guards her emotions and secrets. A former drug peddler and the estranged younger sister of Anu (Aarthi), she is also a close friend of Dr. Vijay and confesses her feelings to him, though he does not reciprocate them as he has feelings for Anu.			Guest
Subiksha Kayarohanam	Dr. Amala	A senior resident and cardiologist at R.K. Hospital who joins alongside Dr.Raghav in the third season. She is innocent at heart and fun-loving by nature, easily lifting the spirits of those around her. She also develops feelings for Dr.Raghav.			Main
Ashwin Raam	Dr. Raghav	A senior resident and cardiologist at R.K. Hospital who joins alongside Dr.Amala in the third season. He is a rugged, reserved, and commanding individual with a quiet strength that earns the respect of everyone around him, and he later becomes Amala's love interest.			Main
Akshatha Das	Dr. Madhu	A medical student who meets Arjun when he returns to clear his arrears in the third season and briefly enters into a relationship with him before they eventually break up.			Main
Karthikeyan DK	Dr. Vinoth	A medical student and a close friend of Arjun and Madhu.			Main
Rahul Rajasekharann	Dr. Kathir	A senior resident at AM Hospital who becomes a close friend of Reena in the third season and develops feelings for her.			Main
C.H. Jayarao	Dr. R.K	The chairman and founder of R.K Multispeciality Hospitals and Arjun's father. He is a key figure in the hospital's power dynamics and is concerned about his son's reckless behavior, hoping a good marriage will bring him stability. His declining health becomes a central point of drama in the series.	Main	Mentioned	
Amit Bhargav	Madhan	MNM (who is the rival of R.K)'s eldest son; A recurring character who is always present and often adds to the drama. His character is noted for not giving off "villain vibes" despite being one of the more straight-up antagonists in the show.	Main	Recurring	
T. M. Karthik	Dr. Preetham	A manipulative and ill-willed doctor who tries to create discord among the hospital staff to usurp the CEO's position.		Main	
Sharmila Thapa	Aruna	A senior nurse in R.K Hospital	Main	Main	Main
Chandrasekar Koneru	Dev	Radhi's husband, Divi & Sid's father, Reena's stepfather	Main	Main	Main
Riya Manoj	Divya "Divi"	Radhi and Dev's daughter; Reena's stepsister	Main	Main	Main
Diyansh K	Sid	Radhi and Dev's son; Reena's stepbrother	Main	Main	Main
Kavithalayaa Krishnan	Ganesh	Thiyagu's friend and Radhi's neighbor, who is a well-wisher of Reena.	Main	Main	Main
Devishree	Sharadha	Ganesh's wife	Main	Main	
Sindhu Shyam	Jennifer	A Classical dancer; Suryakant's ex-wife; Guna's mother	Recurring	Recurring	
Giri Dwarakish	Dr. Ramanathan "Cinema Doctor"	An amusing character known for his love of cinema. He is a senior figure at the hospital who provides a lighter, more entertaining dynamic to the series.	Main	Recurring	
Syamantha Kiran	Suchitra Madhan "Suchi"	Madhan's wife	Recurring	Recurring	
Varshini Suresh	Sonia	Reena's best friend since childhood who settled in Kolkata by marriage	Recurring	Recurring	
Sherin Farhana ^{Y}	Sonia	Reena's best friend since childhood who settled in Kolkata by marriage	Guest	Guest	
Revathi Elango	Bharathi	Ravi's cousin turned wife	Main		
Aruljothi Arockiaraj	Charu	Ramanathan's daughter; Rocky's love interest	Recurring	Recurring	
Samridha Sam	Agalya Madhan	Madhan and Suchitra's daughter	Recurring	Recurring	
Riyaz Khan	Suryakanth	An actor; Jennifer's ex- husband and Guna's father	Guest	Guest	
Indumathy Manikandan	Pallavi	RK's wife and Arjun's mother	Guest	Mentioned	
Dasarathy	MNM	RK's sponsor for the hospital land; Father of Madhan, Manasa and Naveen	Guest	Mentioned	
Saravanan Rajavel	Kishore	Compounder at R.K Hospital	Recurring		
Gaayathri Krishnan	Rani	Ravi's mother	Recurring		
Aghalya		Teju's mother	Recurring	Recurring	
Theni Murugan		Teju's father	Recurring	Recurring	
Nila		Amaya and Abinaya's mother		Recurring	
Jairam		Amaya and Abinaya's father		Recurring	
Vetri Kiran		Nilofer's father		Recurring	
Kavitha Suresh		Nilofer's mother		Recurring	
Manoharan Krishnan		Kiran and Sindhu's father		Recurring	
Soundarya Saravanan		Kiran and Sindhu's mother		Recurring	
Riya Choudhary	Vikruthi	Arjun's college friend who works as a lecturer at the same college, later lecturing him in the third season when he returns to clear his arrears.		Guest	Recurring
Rajeev Parameshwaran	Vinayak	Aaradhana and Anu's father			Recurring
Gowri Janu		Divi's School Principal			Recurring
Douglas Kumaaramoorthy	Kanniyappan	Ambulance driver at R.K Hospital			Recurring
Yogi	Murugan	Reena's hostel warden	Guest		
Bose Venkat			Guest		
Mounika Devi		A conjoint twins mother	Guest		
Nikeytha	Madhavi	A Patient			Guest
Sumithra Devi L	Mithra	A Patient			Guest
Vikey G		Dr.Amala's eccentric Ex-boyfriend			Guest
Auditor Sridhar	Srinivasan	The judge who seeks revenge on RK Hospital for suspending his heart transplant.			Recurring
Murali Krishnan		The heart donor’s father, who opposes the transplant, is addressing the judge.			Guest
Anandha Krishnan	Prabhakar	Patient Shyamala's son			Guest
Mounica Santhosh	Archana	Prabhakar's wife			Guest
Atchaya Bharathi	Varsha	A triplet's mother, a patient			Guest

== Production ==
=== Development ===
The series was announced by JioHotstar in early 2024, following the popularity of other Tamil web series such as Mathagam and Label. It was slated to be a medical drama titled Heart Beat, written and directed by Deepak Sundarrajan, and produced by Padmini Velu and Rajavelu for A Tele Factory.

=== Casting ===
Malayalam actress Anumol plays the lead role in the series. Initially actress Abhirami was considered but could not be cast due to date clashes.

=== Release ===
The first trailer was released on 9 February 2024 featuring to Deepa Balu as Reena, a medical intern on her first day at work. It was announced on 11 February that the series would be released in Tamil and dubbed into other Indian languages. It was also given a release date of 8 March 2024, coinciding with International Women's Day.

== Soundtrack ==
The theme song was released 25 January 2024 on YouTube.

Track list
No.	Title	Lyrics	Music	Artist	Length
1.	"Heartbeat Paattu"	Super Subu	Madley Blues (Harish Venkat and Prashanth)	Harish Venkat	0:55
2.	"Ondragum Aasaigal" (Season 2 Episode 92)	A Pa Raja	Sudharshan	Padmaja Sreenivasan	03:07
