= Engaeyum Eppothum =

- Theatrical release poster
- Directed by: M. Saravanan
- Written by: M. Saravanan
- Produced by: A. R. Murugadoss
- Starring: Jai; Sharwanand; Anjali; Ananya
- Cinematography: Velraj
- Edited by: Kishore Te
- Music by: C. Sathya
- Production companies: AR Murugadoss Productions; Fox Star Studios
- Release date: 16 September 2011
- Running time: 138 minutes
- Country: India
- Language: Tamil

Engaeyum Eppothum (transl. Anywhere, Anytime) is a 2011 Indian Tamil-language romantic drama road film written and directed by M. Saravanan in his Tamil debut. It stars Jai, Sharvanand, Anjali, and Ananya in the lead roles. It was produced by A. R. Murugadoss in association with Fox Star Studios, marking the studio's entry into Tamil cinema. The film is based on a true incident.

The film illustrates two love stories—one set against the backdrop of Chennai and the other in Trichy—which is mixed up in the climax. The film released on 16 September 2011. It was later remade into Kannada as Endendu Ninagagi in 2014 and in Bengali as Bojhena Shey Bojhena in 2012.

== Plot ==
The film focuses on two love stories in Chennai and Tiruchirappalli; one takes place over the period of a day, while the other unfolds over months.

The film starts with a road accident, then flashes back to several months earlier when Amudha, a native village girl from Tiruchirappalli, arrives in Chennai for a job interview, but her sister is unable to meet her to direct her to her destination. Amudha enlists the aid of a stranger named Gautham, who agrees to take her as far as the bus stop. However, he ends up travelling with her the entire day, waiting for her during her interview, and dropping her off at her sister's home in the evening. Throughout the day, she comes to understand him and becomes fond of him. While remaining calm and reserved, Gautham reciprocates her feelings. The following day, Amudha returns to Tiruchirappalli, where she realizes that she has fallen in love with Gautham and rejects marriage proposals that come her way. She decides to return to Chennai to meet him. Meanwhile, Gautham realizes that he has fallen in love with Amudha and decides to go to Tiruchi to find her, despite not knowing her address or any other details except her name.

A parallel story follows, where Kathiresan, a metal shop worker, harbors feelings towards his neighbor Manimegalai, a nurse. Being shy and soft-spoken, he does not talk to her but continues to watch her every morning for six months. Manimegalai is bold and forthcoming; she agrees to Kathiresan's love and orders him around mercilessly. She puts him through several tests: having him meet her father (a policeman), her former one-sided lover on his own, making him undergo an HIV test, and getting him to agree to organ donation. She wants him to decide on the basis of all that she has put him through whether he wants to marry her and spend the rest of his life with her; Kathiresan responds affirmatively. The two grow to love each other unconditionally with their families' consent.

Kathiresan decides to take Manimegalai to visit his family in Arasur, a village near Villupuram, and the two board a bus to get there. Meanwhile, Gautham boards a bus to return from Tiruchirappalli – the same one that Kathiresan and Manimegalai are travelling in. Simultaneously, Amudha boards a bus to return from Chennai. A few glimpses of other passengers are also seen: a mother and her child, a girls' athletic team, a newly married couple, two college students who are attracted to each other, and a man returning from Dubai to see his five-year-old daughter for the first time.

At a distance from Viluppuram on the Chennai-Tiruchirappalli National Highway 79 (GST road), The State Express Transport Corporation ( SETC) bus is redirected into the opposite lane, as one of the lanes is under construction. However, before a contract carriage (omni) bus named Sky Travels is redirected, a tarp from a truck blows off and blocks the windshield. Unable to see where he is going, the terrified driver accidentally swerves into the path of the SETC bus. Both buses collide head-on, killing about 35 people on the spot. Many others die en route to or at the hospital. Gautham sees a severely injured Amudha on the other bus, and she is rushed to a hospital. She reaches the hospital along with Gautham, while Kathiresan has succumbed to head trauma and died. At the hospital, Gautham confesses his love to Amudha at her bedside, and she manages to regain consciousness. Kathiresan's dead body is taken away by a hysteric Manimegalai and his grieving parents.

The site of the crash is declared an accident-prone area, and the film ends with a message on road safety.

== Cast ==
- Jai as Kathiresan
- Sharvanand as Gautham
- Anjali as Manimegalai
- Ananya as Amudha
- Vatsan Chakravarthy as Ramesh
- Deepthi Nambiar as Pooja
- Vinodhini Vaidyanathan as Selvi
- Ravi as Gautham's father
- Mithun as a bus passenger
- Sabha Srinivaasan as Manimegalai's father
- Priya Prince as a bus passenger
- Thangadurai as Senthil
- Nimisha
- Rishabh
- Venkatesh
- Venkata Perumal
- Velayutham
- Ilango
- PTC Raghu
- Kumara Vadivelu
- Senthil Kumar
- P D Ramesh
- Kovai Babu Khan
- Meiyappan
- Sukumar
- Albert
- Krishna Moorthy
- Meenakumari
- Radha
- Master Karthik
- Viji Sekar
- Baby Yutra
- Ganesh
- Agaram
- Nagu

== Production ==
Production began in December 2010 with Vimal and Amala Paul playing a pair in the film. However they pulled out due to prior commitments and were replaced by Sharwanand and Ananya. The film was predominantly shot on location as the director wanted to avoid the artificiality of studios and sets.

== Soundtrack ==
Engaeyum Eppothum

Soundtrack album by C. Sathya
- Released: 3 August 2011
- Recorded: 2011
- Length: 19:21
- Label: Think Music
- Producer: C. Sathya

C. Sathya chronology
Engaeyum Eppothum (2011)	Sevarkodi (2012)

Professional ratings
Review scores
Source	Rating
Rediff	3/5 stars

The film's score and soundtrack were composed by debutant C. Sathya. The album was released on 3 August 2011 in Chennai.

Track listing
No.	Title	Lyrics	Singer(s)	Length
1.	"Govindha"	Na Muthukumar	Vijay Prakash, Ranina Reddy, Boni	04:03
2.	"Chotta Chotta"	Na Muthukumar	Chinmayi, Sathya	04:23
3.	"Masaamaa"	M Saravanan	Sathya, Aalap Raju	03:55
4.	"Un Perae Theriyathu"	Na Muthukumar	Madhushree, Aalap Raju	04:37
5.	"Uyir Aruthathe"	M Saravanan	Sayanora	02:23

== Critical reception ==
Pavithra Srinivasan of Rediff gave Engaeyum Eppothum 3 out of 5, calling it a "genuinely story, not just about romance, but about the fabric of life itself". A critic from Sify wrote that Engeyum Eppodhum was "riveting cinema with a difference. Everything is new about it from characters to the plot, accompanied by superb performances by the lead actors notably Anjali". The Hindu reviewer Karthik Subramanian noted that it was a "laudable effort" adding that "despite some clichés, the film works well". G Sai Shyam, another critic from The Hindu, wrote that it was "a novel attempt by the director" and that "the compelling screenplay with a strong message to everyone makes it a must watch film". Vikatan gave 50 out of 100 marks, ranking it among the best in recent times. Venkateswaran Narayanan from The Times of India gave 3 out of 5 and wrote that it was "the perfect example of a film relying solely on its screenplay and performances to strike it rich at the box office". On the contrary, Gautaman Bhaskaran of Hindustan Times gave it 2.5 and praised the lead performances, while criticising the screenplay and the plot.

== Release ==
The film was dubbed to Telugu as Journey, and released on 16th December 2011.

== Awards ==
M Saravanan was honoured with an award by the Human Rights Organisation on 18 December at Paramakudi for directing Engeyum Eppodhum with a very relevant social message. Anjali won the Best Actress Award at V4 Entertainment Awards 2011.

1st South Indian International Movie Awards

- Best Lyricist — Na Muthukumar for "Un Pera Theriyathe"
- Best Debutant Director — M Saravanan
- Best Debutant Male — Sharvanand

59th Filmfare Awards South

- Best Actress - Anjali
- Best Supporting Actress - Ananya

6th Vijay Awards

- Best Film
- Best Actress - Anjali
- Nominated-Best Director - M Saravanan
- Nominated-Best Supporting Actress - Ananya
- Nominated-Best Music Director - C Sathya

Edison Awards

- Edison Award for Best Debut Director – M Saravanan
- Edison Award for Best Female Playback Singer - Chinmayi for "Chotta Chotta"

Engeyum Eppodhum appeared on the following top five lists of the best films of 2011.

- 2nd place — Rediff
- 3rd place — The Hindu
- 5th place — The Asian Age

== In other media ==
The character portrayed by Jai makes a cameo appearance in 2015 film Massu Engira Masilamani.
