= Ivan Veramathiri =

2013 Indian film by M. Saravanan

- Film poster
- Directed by: M. Saravanan
- Written by: M. Saravanan
- Produced by: N. Linguswamy (Presenter); N. Subash Chandrabose; Ronnie Screwvala; Siddharth Roy Kapur
- Starring: Vikram Prabhu; Surbhi; Ganesh Venkatraman; Vamsi Krishna; Hariraj
- Cinematography: Shakthi
- Edited by: A. Sreekar Prasad
- Music by: C. Sathya
- Production company: Thirupathi Brothers
- Distributed by: UTV Motion Pictures
- Release date: 13 December 2013
- Running time: 153 minutes
- Country: India
- Language: Tamil

Ivan Veramathiri (transl. He is different) is a 2013 Indian Tamil-language action thriller film written and directed by M. Saravanan. The film has been presented by director N. Linguswamy and produced by his brother N. Subash Chandrabose under Thirupathi Brothers, in association with Ronnie Screwvala and Siddharth Roy Kapur under UTV Motion Pictures. The film stars Vikram Prabhu, debutant Surbhi, Ganesh Venkatraman, Vamsi Krishna and Hariraj. The background score and soundtrack were composed by C. Sathya. The film was released on 13 December 2013 to positive reviews.

The director adapted the core storyline of this movie in Kannada as Chakravyuha (2016) starring Puneeth Rajkumar.

== Plot ==
Tamil Nadu State Law minister Sadasivam asks for his illegal "minister's allocation quota" in student admissions in Chennai Government Law College, but the new principal refuses to yield, as the students in the quota are unfit to study law. In order to remove the principal, he plans and instigates violence in the campus using his men studying there. Many students die due to this clash, and the college is closed for two months. Gunasekaran, a 27-year-old MBA-graduate, hears the cries of the dead student's mother, and takes the matter seriously.

Guna kidnaps Eeswaran, the paroled-brother of Sadasivam and houses him in a half built bathroom at an abandoned construction site for 6 days. Eeswaran is forced to drink latrine water to stay alive. At the same time, due to certain coincidences, Guna meets and falls for Malini. Their families meet and agree for their wedding. Eeswaran's deadline to return to prison ends and Sadasivam tries to find him but to no avail. Sadasivam is arrested by DCP Aravindan, as he had given legal assurance for his brother's parole, and is removed from the state cabinet.

Guna releases a fainted Eeswaran, who is promptly arrested. Eeswaran escapes custody by killing two policemen and searches for his kidnapper. Due to an error by Guna, Eeswaran captures Malini using her bank account number, and kills one of her collegemates in an attempt to find his kidnapper, and later ties her disguised as a scarecrow atop the same building where he was confined. Guna and Malini's family start searching for Malini, while Aravindan vows to kill Eeswaran to avenge the death of his men. In the meantime, to protect the ruling party's image, Sadasivam is killed in a made-up encounter, which is termed as a suicide. When Eeswaran is nearly caught by the police, he boards a bike, which is being driven by Guna himself.

Later, Eeswaran sees Guna's locket, he realizes that Guna is his kidnapper, and tries to strangle him to death. They end up reaching the building, where they fight. In the ensuing melee, Guna kills Eeswaran by snapping his neck, and rescues Malini. They are later admitted in the hospital, where DCP Aravindan visits them, who praises Guna for their well-intentional act. The police have closed Eeswaran's death as an encounter and Aravindan receives his promotion.

== Cast ==
- Vikram Prabhu as Gunasekaran
- Surbhi as Malini
- Ganesh Venkatraman as DCP Aravindan IPS
- Vamsi Krishna as Eeswaran
- Hariraj as Sadasivam
- Charmila as Malini's mother
- Malavika Menon as Divya
- Nisha Krishnan as Gunasekaran's friend

== Production ==
Earlier Saravanan considered Arya and Vishal for the lead role in this film. Later he said that "I watched the trailer of Kumki and was impressed with Vikram’s intense performance. Later when I met him in person, his height, build and confidence made an impact on me. Moreover, his positive attitude and eagerness to take on challenging roles made me sign him up for my film". Vikram Prabhu plays a city-bred youth seething with anger which surfaces every now and then. It was reported that Monal Gajjar was selected for an equally important female role. It was then reported that Surbhi, a Delhi-based girl was cast opposite Vikram. The heroine was not officially confirmed and it was said that the director wanted to reveal her identity once the shooting was completed. Telugu actor Vamsi Krishna was chosen to play the antagonist role in this film.

The film's principal photography was commenced on 19 September 2012 in Chennai.

== Soundtrack ==
Ivan Veramathiri

Soundtrack album by C. Sathya
- Released: 6 November 2013
- Recorded: 2013
- Genre: Soundtrack
- Length: 20:42
- Language: Tamil
- Label: Sony Music India
- Producer: C. Sathya

C. Sathya chronology
Nedunchaalai (2013)	Ivan Veramathiri (2013)	Kanchana 2 (2015)

The film's score and soundtrack were composed by C. Sathya and Released by Sony Music India.

Track list
No.	Title	Lyrics	Singer(s)	Length
1.	"Malayaala Porattala"	Viveka	Tippu, Hyde Karty, Bizmac	3:06
2.	"Ennai Maranthaen"	Na. Muthukumar	Madhushree	4:13
3.	"Ranga Ranga"	Mani Amudhavan	Rita	3:57
4.	"Thanimayile"	Viveka	Anand Aravindakshan, Nivas	4:06
5.	"Loveulla"	Viveka	C. Sathya, Udit Narayan	3:54
6.	"Idhuthaan"	Pudhiyadhoar Kavignan Seivom Team	Balram	1:26
Total length:				20:42

== Release ==
The satellite rights of the film were sold to STAR Vijay.

=== Critical reception ===
Ivan Veramathiri opened to positive reviews by critics.

The Hindu wrote "Ivan Vera Maathiri is several notches above your usual action movie. The coincidences are smartly woven in, the location shooting is nicely done, and some of the action, especially a chase down a busy road, is staged quite well. More importantly, the film never loses sight of the personal costs, the collateral damage, that come with vigilantism". Sify wrote, "Director Saravanan after the brilliant Engeyum Eppothum is not in his elements in the thriller genre, where he wants to show the nexus between the politician and corrupt education system. However, he is able to keep the audience spellbound in the last 15 minutes of the film which is electrifying".

The Times of India gave 3 stars out of 5 wrote, "If the screenplay was the strength of Saravanan's debut Enageyum Eppothum, here, it becomes a weakness as the director's attempts to make a "different" vigilante film get lost in implausibility, patronizing and sub-par acting. He has the outline of a terrific action movie plot; However, the scenes aren't particularly interesting beyond a strictly functional level". Rediff gave 2.5 stars out of 5 and wrote, "Ivan Veramathiri lacks the simplicity, depth and magic of Director M Saravanan’s last film Engeyum Eppodhum". Indiaglitz gave 3 out of 5 saying "Saravanan is known to make his stories gripping and racy. With Sakthi and Srikar Prasad for technical expertise, the director has re-established his name in the tinsel town with 'Ivan Veramathiri'. The film's screenplay slows down at places, but that is not entirely a shortfall." Desimartini gave 3 out of 5. Behindwoods gave 3 stars out of 5 and wrote, "Ivan Vera Mathiri is likely to leave you satisfied having served its well distributed portions of comedy, romance, action, suspense and all round entertainment".

=== Box office ===
At the TN box office, the film grossed ₹2.5 crore (US$260,000) on its first day and earned over ₹6.2 crore (US$640,000) during the first weekend. The film later slowed down at the box office owing to big budget films like Biriyani, Endrendrum Punnagai, Veeram and Jilla, but yet remained steady at multiplexes and completed a 100 days-run in one theater (Sai Shanti in Chennai).
