= M. Saravanan (director) =

Indian film director (born 1977)

- Born: 27 April 1977 (age 49); Varagur, Namakkal district, Tamil Nadu, India
- Occupations: Film director; screenwriter
- Years active: 2009–present

M. Saravanan is an Indian film director, best known for directing the film Engeyum Eppodhum (2011).

== Career ==
Saravanan began his career as an assistant director under director A. R. Murugadoss. In 2009, he made his directorial debut with the Telugu film Ganesh starring Ram. In 2011, he directed his first Tamil film Engeyum Eppodhum which featured Jai, Anjali, Ananya and Sharvanand, and was produced by his mentor A. R. Murugadoss in association with Fox Star Studios. The film gained very positive responses from critics and audience alike, emerging a sleeper hit. He was honoured with an award by the Human Rights Organization for directing Engeyum Eppodhum with a "very relevant social message which is the need of the hour".

Additionally, Saravanan directed the Tamil film Naadu, which portrays a real-time story set in the beautiful Kolli Hills. Through his direction, Saravanan brings his creative vision to life, capturing the essence of the location and delivering an engaging narrative.

== Filmography ==
Year	Film	Language	Notes			
Year	Film	Language	Notes	2009	Ganesh Just Ganesh	Telugu
2011	Engeyum Eppodhum	Tamil				
2013	Ivan Veramathiri	Tamil				
2015	Valiyavan	Tamil				
2016	Chakravyuha	Kannada	Remake of Ivan Veramathiri			
2022	Raangi	Tamil				
2023	Naadu	Tamil				

== Awards ==
Film	Award	Category	Result	Ref
Engeyum Eppodhum	Edison Award 2012	Best Debut Director	Won	
Engeyum Eppodhum	6th Vijay Awards	Best Director	Nominated	
Engeyum Eppodhum	6th Vijay Awards	Best Story, Screenplay Writer	Nominated	
Engeyum Eppodhum	1st South Indian International Movie Awards	Best Director	Nominated	
Engeyum Eppodhum	1st South Indian International Movie Awards	Best Debut Director	Won	
