= Umamaheswari R =

Indian dubbing artist

Umamaheswari R is an Indian dubbing artist. She made her debut with Kalavani for heroine voices. She is currently working in Tamil, Malayalam and Telugu industry and has dubbed more than fifty Tamil feature films. She also lent her voice in several Sun TV serials for some supporting characters too.

== Filmography ==
| Year | Film | Actress | Character | Language |
|---|---|---|---|---|
| 2006 | Vallavan | Sandhya | Suji | Tamil |
| 2010 | Kalavani | Oviya | Maheshwari | Tamil |
| 2011 | Vaagai Sooda Vaa | Iniya | Madhiarasi | Tamil |
| 2012 | Kalakalappu | Oviya | Maya | Tamil |
| 2012 | Marina | Oviya | Swapnasundari | Tamil |
| 2013 | Naiyaandi | Nazriya Nazim | Vanaroja | Tamil |
| 2013 | Masani | Iniya | Masani | Tamil |
| 2013 | Ethir Neechal | Nandita Swetha | Valli | Tamil |
| 2013 | Idharkuthane Aasaipattai Balakumara | Nandita Swetha | Kumudha | Tamil |
| 2014 | Mundasupatti | Nandita Swetha | Kalaivani | Tamil |
| 2014 | Aindhaam Thalaimurai Sidha Vaidhiya Sigamani | Nandita Swetha | Nandhini | Tamil |
| 2014 | Oru Oorla Rendu Raja | Vishakha Singh | Kalpana | Tamil |
| 2014 | Cuckoo | Malvika Nair | Sudhanthirakodi | Tamil |
| 2014 | Yennamo Yedho | Rakul Preet Singh | Nithya | Tamil |
| 2015 | Baahubali: The Beginning | Anushka | Yuvarani Devasena | Tamil |
| 2015 | Chandi Veeran | Anandhi | Thamarai | Tamil |
| 2016 | Raja Manthiri | Shaalin Zoya | Subha | Tamil |
| 2016 | Rekka | Sija Rose | Mala | Tamil |
| 2016 | Manithan | Aishwarya Rajesh | Jennifer | Tamil |
| 2016 | Irudhi Suttru | Ritika Singh | Ezhil Madhi | Tamil |
| 2017 | Guru | Ritika Singh | Rameswari | Telugu |
| 2017 | Amma Kanakku | Amala Paul | Shanthi | Tamil |
| 2017 | Baahubali: The Conclusion | Anushka | Yuvarani Devasena | Tamil |
| 2017 | Thondan | Arthana Binu | Mahishasuramardini | Tamil |
| 2018 | Bhaagamathie | Anushka | Sanchala | Tamil |
| 2018 | Semma | Arthana Binu | Magizhini | Tamil |
| 2018 | Oru Nalla Naal Paathu Solren | Niharika Konidela | Sowmya/Alakshmi | Tamil |
| 2018 | Billa Pandi | Chandini Tamilarasan | Valli | Tamil |
| 2018 | Pakka | Bindu Madhavi | Nadhiya | Tamil |
| 2019 | Thadam | Vidya Pradeep | Malarvizhi | Tamil |
| 2019 | Saaho | Shraddha Kapoor | Amritha Nair | Tamil |
| 2019 | Manikarnika: The Queen of Jhansi | Kangana Ranaut | Rani Lakshmi Bhai | Tamil |
| 2019 | Chithiram Pesuthadi 2 | Radhika Apte | Durga | |
| 2020 | World Famous Lover | Raashii Khanna | Yamini | Tamil Only |
| 2022 | Thiruchitrambalam | Nithya Menen | Shobana | Telugu Only |
| 2022 | Theal | Samyuktha Hedge | Thilaka | Tamil |
| 2022 | AGP Schizophrenia | Lakshmi Menon | Pooja | Tamil |
| 2022 | Nitham Oru Vaanam | Aparna Balamurali | Madhi | Tamil |
