= M. Muthaiya =

Indian film director

- Born: Srivilliputhur, Tamil Nadu, India
- Occupations: Film director, screenwriter
- Years active: 2013–present

M. Muthaiya is an Indian film director and screenwriter who works in Tamil cinema. He is known for directing village-based action films.

== Career ==
Muthaiya moved to Chennai from Srivilliputhur in Virudhunagar to make movies and debuted with the rural drama Kutti Puli (2013) starring Sasikumar. The film did not receive favorable reviews from the media but went on to perform well at the box office.

Muthaiya moved on to make Komban (2015), a story set in the Ramanathapuram district starring Karthi, Lakshmi Menon, and Rajkiran. The film is about an aggressive man (Karthi) and his relationship with his father-in-law (Rajkiran). Muthaiya, inspired by the egotistical tussles between his father and his grandmother, scripted the story straight from his own experiences. The release of Komban was mired by controversy when protesters claimed that the story revolved around the animosity between different caste groups and that it therefore had the potential to incite violence in southern districts of Tamil Nadu. After a brief legal battle, the film opened to positive reviews and did well commercially.

Following the success of Komban, Muthaiya made Marudhu (2016), featuring Vishal and Sridivya in the lead roles. The film received mixed reviews from critics but was a decent hit.

In 2017, Muthaiya reunited with Sasikumar to make another rural drama film titled Kodiveeran. Prior to the release of the film, the film's producer committed suicide due to financial problems.

In January 2018, Muthaiya began work on Devarattam, a second film with Studio Green, which features a brother-sisters relationship with Gautham Karthik in the lead role. The film released in 2019 to negative reviews but was still a hit. The film was an average rural action entertainer with routine elements that may have worked for audiences in Madurai, Tirunelveli, and surrounding areas.

Muthaiya followed the same successful style in Pulikkuthi Pandi (2021), which stars Vikram Prabhu and Lakshmi Menon comparing their previous film. Pulikkuthi Pandi is Lakshmi Menon's third film under Muthaiya's direction, and the film also marks the actress's comeback to big screens after four years of film.

In August 2022, Muthaiya's much expected Viruman, the first time under the banner of 2D Entertainment was released. The film features Karthi in the lead role, marking his second collaboration with Muthaiya, and was produced by Suriya and Jyothika. Aditi Shankar, the daughter of Indian director Shankar, made her acting debut as the female lead.

In 2023, Muthaiya directed Kathar Basha Endra Muthuramalingam, which saw him collaborating with Arya for the first time.

== Filmmaking style ==
Muthaiya is known for his regional village oriented scripts and mostly directs Madurai, Ramanathapuram, Virudhunagar, Theni, Tirunelveli and Tenkasi-based movies.

== Filmography ==
=== As film director ===
| Year | Film | Notes |
|---|---|---|
| 2013 | Kutti Puli | Mother-Son Bond |
| 2015 | Komban | Father in Law-Son in Law Bond |
| 2016 | Marudhu | Grandmother-Grandson Bond |
| 2017 | Kodiveeran | Brother-Sister Bond |
| 2019 | Devarattam | Sister-Brother Bond. Based on Pollachi Story. True Incidents |
| 2021 | Pulikkuthi Pandi | Wife-Husband Bond. |
| 2022 | Viruman | Father-Son Bond |
| 2023 | Kathar Basha Endra Muthuramalingam | No idea about the story. |
| 2025 | Rambo | Genre Shift. Boxing Story |
| TBA | Sullan Sethu | |
| TBA | Irulan | |

=== As screenwriter ===
- Raid (2023)

=== Frequent collaborators ===
| Collaborator | Kutti Puli; (2013) | Komban; (2015) | Marudhu; (2016) | Kodiveeran; (2017) | Devarattam; (2019) | Pulikkuthi Pandi; (2021) | Viruman; (2022) | Kathar Basha Endra Muthuramalingam; (2023) | Rambo; (2025) |
|---|---|---|---|---|---|---|---|---|---|
| G. Gnanasambandam | Yes | Yes | Yes | Yes | Yes | | Yes | | |
| Namo Narayana | Yes | Yes | Yes | | | Yes | | | |
| Lakshmi Menon | Yes | Yes | | | | Yes | | | |
| Vela Ramamoorthy | | Yes | | | Yes | Yes | | | |
| R. K. Suresh | | | Yes | | | Yes | Yes | | |
| Soori | | | Yes | | Yes | | Yes | | |
| Singampuli | | | | | | Yes | Yes | Yes | |
| Aruldoss | | | Yes | | | Yes | Yes | | |
| G. Marimuthu | | Yes | Yes | | | Yes | | | |
| Saravana Sakthi | Yes | | Yes | Yes | Yes | | | | |
| Rajasimman | Yes | Yes | | | | Yes | | | |
| Hello Kandasamy | Yes | Yes | | | Yes | Yes | Yes | | |
