= Kaari (film) =

2022 Indian film by Hemanth

- Theatrical release poster
- Directed by: Hemanth
- Written by: Hemanth
- Produced by: S. Lakshman Kumar
- Starring: M. Sasikumar; Parvathy Arun; J. D. Chakravarthy; Balaji Sakthivel
- Cinematography: Ganesh Chandhrra
- Edited by: T. Shivanandeeswaran
- Music by: D. Imman
- Production company: Prince Pictures
- Release date: 25 November 2022
- Running time: 142 minutes
- Country: India
- Language: Tamil

Kaari (transl. Effective) is a 2022 Indian Tamil-language sports action drama film written and directed by Hemanth, in his directorial debut, and produced by S. Lakshman Kumar under the banner of Prince Pictures. The film stars M. Sasikumar, Parvathy Arun, J. D. Chakravarthy and Balaji Sakthivel, with Aadukalam Naren, Ammu Abhirami, Redin Kingsley and Nagineedu in supporting roles. The music was composed by D. Imman, and cinematography and editing handled by Ganesh Chandhrra and T. Shivanandeeswaran, respectively. The film was released in theatres on 25 November 2022.

== Plot ==
The plot follows a race jockey, a multimillionaire, and a resident of the village of Kariyoor whose separate lives intersect following a series of events. The narrative incorporates action sequences alongside themes of romance, betrayal, and personal sacrifice.

== Cast ==
- M. Sasikumar as Sethu
- Parvathy Arun as Meena
- J. D. Chakravarthy as SKR
- Balaji Sakthivel as Meena's father
- Aadukalam Naren as Vellasaamy
- Ammu Abhirami as Sethu's friend
- Redin Kingsley as Sethu's friend
- Nagineedu as Duraipandi
- Ramkumar Ganesan as Sethu's coach
- Samyuktha Shanmuganathan as SKR's wife
- Prem as Sethu's friend
- Namo Narayana as MLA
- Arunmozhithevan as village villain in Jallikattu
- Rajapandi as Village Founder

== Production ==
The film, the directorial debut of Hemanth, began production in July 2021, and was completed a year later, with the title Kaari unveiled that March.

== Music ==
D. Imman composed the soundtrack and background score of the film while collaborating with actor Sasikumar for fourth time after Vetrivel, Kennedy Club and Udanpirappe and director Hemanth for first time. The audio rights were acquired by Sony Music India. The first single "Goppamavaney" was released on 30 March 2022. The second single "Saanjikkava" was released on 14 June 2022. The third single "Engum Oli Pirakkumay" was released on 1 July 2022.

Track listing
No.	Title	Lyrics	Singer(s)	Length
1.	"Goppamavaney"	Lalithanand	Kailash Kher, Madhu Balakrishnan	4:42
2.	"Saanjikkava"	Lalithanand	Sid Sriram	4:05
3.	"Engum Oli Pirakkumay"	Hemanth	Muthu Sirpi	4:14
4.	"Thalaimaganey"	Hemanth	Swasthika Swaminathan	2:36
Total length:				14:97

== Release ==
=== Theatrical ===
Kaari was released in theatres on 25 November 2022.

=== Home media ===
The film began streaming ZEE5 from 23 December 2022.

== Reception ==
Logesh Balachandran of The Times of India rated the film 3 out of 5 stars and wrote "Kaari is interesting and engaging in parts, but it isn't impactful enough for the audience to remember." Dinamalar rated the film 2 out of 5 stars. A critic for News18 wrote "On the technical front, including cinematography and music, Kaari doesn’t disappoint. Ganesh Chandra’s camerawork is brilliant in this Tamil film." Navein Darshan of Cinema Express wrote "Kaari talks about the importance of communal harmony and the resultant synergy that does miracles. But ironically, the tasteful ingredients in Kaari don't blend well together as a wholesome dish." A critic from Hindu Tamil Thisai gave the film 3 out of 5 stars and wrote that In Imman's music, the songs and background score help to carry the heavy story with ease. A critic for Cinema Vikatan wrote that that if only one issue had been approached with more depth and clarity of understanding, this Kaari would have been furious.
