= Kodiveeran =

2017 Indian film by M. Muthaiah

- Theatrical release poster
- Directed by: M. Muthaiah
- Written by: M. Muthaiah
- Produced by: Sasikumar
- Starring: Sasikumar; Vidharth; Mahima Nambiar; Pasupathy; Poorna
- Cinematography: S. R. Kathir
- Edited by: Venkat Raajen
- Music by: N. R. Raghunanthan
- Production company: Company Productions
- Distributed by: Company Productions
- Release date: 7 December 2017
- Country: India
- Language: Tamil

Kodiveeran (transl. Flag Warrior) is a 2017 Indian Tamil-language action drama film written and directed by M. Muthaiah. The film stars Sasikumar, Vidharth, Mahima Nambiar, Pasupathy, and Poorna. This is Sasikumar and Muthaiah's second collaboration after Kutti Puli. Kodiveeran is produced by Sasikumar's Company Productions. The music was composed by N. R. Raghunanthan, cinematography by S. R. Kathir, and editing by Venkat Raajen. The film released on 7 December 2017.

== Plot ==
Kodiveeran (M. Sasikumar), is a Hindu priest who protects his sister from bad guys. In his village in the Dindigul district, corruption and injustice often happens mostly by Adhigaaram, a factory owner, whose men chase and kill anyone who protests against Adhigaaram. Kodiveeran knows of Adhigaaram's tricks and always beats up his goons if they cause any trouble to the village. In the present day, Villangam Vellaikkaran (Pasupathy) is released from jail and comes to his village where his sister, Velu (Shamna Kasim) is filled with joy to meet him. Kodiveeran and Villangam were enemies as Villangam is a big criminal who brutally kills anyone for money. He gets money from fellow politicians or factory owners who are very wealthy. Adhigaaram has also married Velu so that Villangam can help him with any problems. Kodiveeran hears about Villangam's release from jail and threatens him if he kills or hurts anyone, then he will die. The rest of the story deals with how Kodiveeran saves his family from Villangam and Adhigaaram's goons.

== Cast ==
- Sasikumar as Kodiveeran, Malar's love interest and Parvati's brother.
- Vidharth as Subash Chandrabose (Government Officer), Malar's and Durai's elder brother & Kodiveeran's brother in law.
- Mahima Nambiar as Malar, Kodiveeran's love interest
- Pasupathy as Villangam, Vellaikkaran's & Velu's brother.
- Poorna as Velu, Villangam's sister, Adhigaaram's wife
- Sanusha as Parvathy, Kodiveeran's sister
- Vikram Sugumaran as Durai, Malar's brother
- Inder Kumar as Adhigaaram, Velu's husband
- Bala Saravanan
- Prem as Kathirvel (Lawyer) & Subash Chandra Bose's friend.
- G. Gnanasambandam as Marriage Broker
- Saravana Sakthi as Kodiveeran's uncle
- Thavasi Thevar as Kodiveeran's grandfather
- Florent Pereira as Kandasamy Pandian, Judge and Kathirvel's father.
- Sai Dheena as Police Inspector
- Stalin Muthu as Henchman

== Production ==
This is the director M. Muthaiah's fourth film after Kutti Puli, Komban and Marudhu. This is also touted to be a village entertainer like his previous movies and this is based on brother-sister relationship. Sasikumar is the lead actor and producer of this movie. Director wanted to sign Arjun for antagonist's role, but they decided to sign Madha Yaanai Koottam fame Vikram Sugumaran. The first schedule for filming has begun at Madurai from March 2017. Its reported that Poorna is doing negative role in this movie and for that she is going bald.

== Soundtrack ==
The music was composed by N. R. Raghunanthan. There are six tracks in the movie, which are as follows.

Kodiveeran

Soundtrack album by N. R. Raghunanthan
- Released: 2017
- Language: Tamil
- Producer: N. R. Raghunanthan

N. R. Raghunanthan chronology
Pichuva Kaththi (2017)	Kodiveeran (2017)	Kalavani Mappillai (2018)

No	Song name	Singer(s)	Length
1	"Ayyo Adi Aathe"	Vandhana Srinivasan, Jagadeesh Kumar	4:25
2	"Kalavani"	V. V. Prasanna, Soundarya Bala Nandakumar	4:20
3	"Raga Raga Ragalada"	Ayyappan, Jagatheesh, Velu, Sinduri, Kamalaja, Latha Krishna	2:02
4	"Andam Kidukidunga"	Guru, Mahitha	6:29
5	"Aththa Seeru"	Guru	1:02
6	"Thangame Unna"	Madhu Balakrishnan	3:10
