= Naadodigal 2 =

2020 Indian Tamil-language film directed by Samuthirakani

- Theatrical release poster
- Directed by: Samuthirakani
- Written by: Samuthirakani
- Produced by: S Nandagopal
- Starring: Sasikumar; Anjali; Athulya Ravi; Namitha Marimutthu
- Cinematography: NK Ekambaram
- Edited by: A. L. Ramesh
- Music by: Justin Prabhakaran
- Production company: Madras Enterprises
- Release date: 31 January 2020
- Running time: 150 mins
- Country: India
- Language: Tamil

Naadodigal 2 (transl. Nomads 2) is a 2020 Indian Tamil-language drama film written and directed by Samuthirakani and produced by S Nandagopal under Madras Enterprises. It stars Sasikumar and Anjali. The film's release was on 31 January 2020. The film is a namesake sequel to the highly successful 2009 film Naadodigal. This movie got mixed to negative reviews from audiences.

== Plot ==
Jeeva is a passionate socialist who speaks out against issues in his village with his friends, Sengodi, Priya, and Paandi. Sengodi is a doctor, while Priya is studying to be a Sub-Inspector of Police. After seeing an honour killing video online, Jeeva organises a massive gathering for people who hate caste and tells them to dress in red. In turn, this angers the local caste leader/chieftain, who mixes ruffians dressed in the red dress code and thugs dressed as police officers; they cause a violent riot among the youngsters. The news of the violence reaches his uncle and his mother, who cancel the alliance with a prospective family. At the same time, Priya successfully becomes the first transgender Sub-Inspector of Police. She also reunites with her parents, who disowned her at a young age. After the cancelled engagement, Jeeva's uncle organises an alliance with a girl and her family from the neighbouring village of Keeripatti. Jeeva looks at the photo of the girl, Sowmya, and immediately falls in love with her. Eventually, they get married.

However, on the wedding night, Jeeva sees Sowmya slitting her wrists with a blade. She then reveals her story. Her parents forced her to marry Jeeva, or they would kill her love. The group go to see the boy that Sowmya loves, who got severely beaten. He says that he and Sowmya are from different castes, and Sowmya fell in love with him. He does not want to be a victim of caste mania. Jeeva then brings the two of them together and gets them married. They both get in a car and drive off.

The villagers become agitated after Sowmya's disappearance. Jeeva then reveals to the villagers that he was the one who sent her off. As a result, there is a massive fight between Jeeva and the caste-supporting villagers. Sengodi's father, Tamilarasan, fights the goons and saves Jeeva. After the villagers create fear in life, Paandi reveals the couple are in Andhra Pradesh, in Samara Simha Reddy's house; they are hiding at "Selfie" Chinnamani's house in the village. Meanwhile, Sowmya's relatives search all over South India for the couple. Eventually, Chinnamani leaves the couple in Thrissur.

Meanwhile, Jeeva's elderly friend convinces Sengodi and Jeeva to marry because they have similar principles, philosophies, and lifestyles. Sengodi's family accepts Jeeva as their future son-in-law. Priya gets transferred to Jeeva's village. Jeeva fights for 'no caste' and to hold a 'no caste' convention at the Madras High Court after the district court rejected their plea. Sowmya becomes pregnant but gets upset because she feels alone without their relatives. When Jeeva's friends are planning Jeeva's wedding, Chinnamani arrives looking dull. He tells what happened. Sowmya's husband allows her to call home, and her relatives find their address to bring them home. Jeeva and his friends become upset that their close relatives will betray them.

Sowmya reveals to her family that she is pregnant. Sowmya's aunt also tells Sowmya not to communicate with Jeeva; otherwise, it will cause unnecessary problems. Sowmya tells Jeeva directly not to disturb them. At the same time, Jeeva's villagers meet the caste chieftain to discuss what to do, and the chieftain gives them money. They are planning to organise men to kill the couple as part of an honour killing out of respect for their caste. Priya spots two of the henchmen hired as killers and catches them. She forces one of the henchmen to reveal their plan to her, and Priya tells Jeeva the plan.

Soon, the henchmen hack the couple brutally in the city centre, causing them to bleed profusely. Jeeva and Paandi arrive just in time. They fight the henchmen and load them onto a coach. On the Dindigul highway, Paandi helps transfer the couple onto a different coach and takes them to the hospital. Vikram informs Sengodi that they are at the hospital. Jeeva fights the henchmen but spares them.

After two years, the court allows them to hold the no-caste convention for people against the caste. Sowmya and her husband are living happily with a baby girl. Furthermore, Sengodi and Jeeva are also happily married and have a baby daughter.

== Cast ==
- Sasikumar as Jeeva
- Anjali as Sengodi
- Athulya Ravi as Soumya
- Bharani as Paandi
- Namitha Marimuthu as Priya
- Pawan as Soumya's uncle
- Esakki Barath as Soumya's lover
- Vikram Anand as Vikram
- E. Ramdoss as Jeeva's uncle
- Tulasi as Jeeva's mother
- Sriranjani as Sengodi's mother
- Subhashini Kannan as Soumya's aunt
- Lizzie Antony as Soumya's mother
- Madhushree as Soumya's cousin
- G. Gnanasambandam as Mariyadum Perumal
- Namo Narayana as Selfie Chinnamani
- Anil Murali
- Thavasi as Priya's father
- Pichaikkaran Moorthy
- Porali Dileepan as Police inspector
- Naadodigal Gopal as Gopal
- V. K. Vijayakumar as Villager
- Benjamin as Head constable
- Pallavarajan as Sakthi
- Samuthirakani as Bus driver (special appearance; also voice-over)

== Production ==
The announcement of the film was made in early January 2018 by director Samuthirakani but refused earlier that the film will not be a sequel to the film Naadodigal. The film production went on floors in March 2018. Samuthirakani also revealed that the film would be similar to the first part but with a different storyline. Bharani and Namo Narayana who were part of the prequel film were also added to the cast.

While being busy with the shooting for the film Naadodigal 2, a sequel to the 2009 film Naadodigal, M. Sasikumar chose to work with the director Maruthupandian for the film Asuravadham. The completion of the post-production of the film was around June 2018.

== Soundtrack ==
Naadodigal 2

Soundtrack album by Justin Prabhakaran
- Released: 20 September 2019
- Recorded: 2019
- Genre: Feature film soundtrack
- Length: 24:35
- Language: Tamil
- Label: Sony Music India

Justin Prabhakaran chronology
| Adutha Saattai (2019) | Naadodigal 2 (2019) | Paava Kadhaigal (2020) |

Singles from Naadodigal 2
- 1. "Adhuva Adhuva" Released: 18 July 2019

The film's soundtrack is composed by Justin Prabhakaran, who earlier composed for the director's Thondan, replacing Sundar C Babu who worked as the music director of the film's predecessor. The album features seven songs, with lyrics for the film written by Yugabharathi, G. Logan and Arivu. The song "Shambo Shiva Shambo", a song in the preceding film, was used. Sony Music India secured the film's audio rights.

The first single track, "Adhuva Adhuva", was released on 18 July 2019. The remaining songs and the full album was released on 19 September 2019 at Prasad Film Labs, with the album was made available at music streaming platforms on the next day.

| No. | Title | Lyrics | Singer(s) | Length |
|---|---|---|---|---|
| 1. | "Adhuva Adhuva" | Yugabharathi | Shweta Mohan, Sooraj Santhosh | 3.22 |
| 2. | "Raila Raila" | Yugabharathi | Achu Rajamani | 4:10 |
| 3. | "Varungaalam Engaladhu" | G. Logan, Arivu | G. Logan, Arivu, Gana Ulagam Dharini, Isaivani | 3:46 |
| 4. | "Aana Varudha Paarungadi" | Yugabharathi | Reema | 3:42 |
| 5. | "Paga Paga" | Yugabharathi | Mark Thomas | 4:12 |
| 6. | "Adhuva Adhuva (Rain Version)" | Yugabharathi | Shweta Mohan, Sooraj Santhosh | 3:11 |
| 7. | "Naadodigal 2 (Theme)" | Instrumental | Justin Prabhakaran | 2:12 |
| Total length: | | | | 24:35 |

== Distribution ==
On 24 January 2020, the producers announced that Linda Big Pictures was selected as the film's distribution partner for Tamil Nadu region, followed by Red Giant Movies for City and Salem region, Dhanam Pictures for Chengalpet region, S Picture for North and South Arcot region and Gopuram Films for Coimbatore and Madurai region.

== Release ==
Initially, it was slated for a July 2019 release but later postponed. The producer announced the film's release date would be 31 January 2020. The Satellite Rights Of the Film Was Acquired By Sun TV.
