= Bramman =

2014 Indian film by Socrates

- Theatrical release poster
- Directed by: Socrates
- Written by: Socrates
- Produced by: K. Manju; Anto Joseph
- Starring: M. Sasikumar; Lavanya Tripathi; Naveen Chandra
- Cinematography: Jomon T. John; Faisal Ali
- Edited by: Raja Mohammad
- Music by: Devi Sri Prasad
- Production companies: K Manju Cinemas; Anto Joseph Film Company
- Release date: 21 February 2014
- Running time: 152 minutes
- Country: India
- Language: Tamil

Bramman (transl. Brahma) is a 2014 Indian Tamil-language drama film written and directed by Socrates in his debut. The film stars M. Sasikumar, Lavanya Tripathi and Naveen Chandra, while Santhanam, Soori, and Jayaprakash play supporting roles. It revolves around the efforts of a cinephile and theatre-owner to save his failing theatre from closure. The film was released on 21 February 2014.

== Plot ==
Siva is a cinephile in Coimbatore who leases a single-screen theatre out of passion. However, the theatre is a loss-making enterprise, and he is in financial trouble. Siva falls in love with Gayathri, but her parents want Siva to give up his theatre business as it makes no money. Siva refuses to give up his passion and gives up his love. Siva gets a notice from the commercial tax department to pay an outstanding half a million rupees in taxes or else the theatre would be sealed. Siva decides to get help from his childhood friend Madhan Kumar, who is a leading film director in the Telugu film industry.

15 years ago, Madhan and Siva were friends and classmates at school, who were also big cinephiles. Madhan's father, a Union Government employee forbids Madhan to go to films, as his grades dropped. Madhan, a sharp boy, barters with his father that he will be allowed to pursue his dream of film direction if he achieves the marks prescribed by his father till the completion of his studies. Madhan's father agrees, and his family moves away from Coimbatore using a transfer. Madhan kept his end of the deal and went to Film Institute after college.

Siva reaches Chennai with the hope of meeting Madhan, but all his efforts go in vain. He stays with film assistant directors and repeatedly tries to meet Madhan. One day, Siva accidentally meets a producer named JP, to whom he introduces himself as an associate of Madhan and narrates a story which impresses JP. Siva is offered a chance to direct a film, and JP hands over ₹5 lakh (equivalent to ₹8.7 lakh or US$9,100 in 2026). However, Siva is scared as he has no clue about film direction. Upon learning this, Madhan is furious and meets Siva but cannot identify him. Siva informs him that he is a big fan of Madhan.

JP finds out that Siva is not an associate of Madhan and is doubtful of him directing a film. JP requests Siva to hand over the story rights to him so that he can make the film with another director, to which Siva refuses. Siva learns that JP has actually planned to make the film with Madhan, who is now debuting in the Tamil film industry. Siva feels happy and gives the story rights for free, to JP. Also, Madhan meets Gayathri through matchmakers and falls in love with her. He proposes a wedding arrangement, to which Gayathri's parents agree. Although Gayathri is not interested, she agrees to the wedding as Siva does not reciprocate her love. Madhan reaches Coimbatore for the wedding and suddenly remembers about his childhood friend Siva. He goes to Siva's house to invite him and is shocked upon seeing the photograph of Siva. He then understands the truth. Siva's friend Nandhu informs the sacrifices made by Siva for the success of Madhan, including his love towards Gayathri.

Madhan feels bad that he did not recognise Siva but feels proud that Siva was aware of Madhan's growth over these years. He stops his marriage, meets Siva in his theatre and unites him with Gayathri.

== Cast ==
- M. Sasikumar as Siva
- Lavanya Tripathi as Gayathri
- Naveen Chandra as Madhan Kumar
- Santhanam as Nandhu
- Soori as NBK
- Jayaprakash as JP
- Chaams as Chaams
- Master Prithvi
- Master Mithran
- G. Gnanasambandan as Siva's father
- Arjunan as Lakshmi's ex-lover / CD shop owner
- Malavika Menon as Lakshmi, Siva's younger sister
- Vanitha Krishnachandran as Siva's mother
- Padmapriya Janakiraman (special appearance in the song "Vaada Vaada")
- Vaiyapuri as himself (special appearance)
- Ajay Rathnam as Madhan Kumar's father
- Anu Mohan as Siva's uncle
- Jaya Murali as Gayathri's mother
- Surekha Vani as a college professor
- Dushyanth Jayaprakash as Dushyanth, Siva's younger brother
- George Maryan as director
- Crane Manohar

== Production ==
Bramman is the directorial debut of Socrates, previously an assistant under Kamal Haasan and Moulee. He wrote the script in 2011 with M. Sasikumar in mind for the lead role, but there were delays in meeting the actor due to his commitment to Poraali; Socrates eventually met Sasikumar through editor Raja Mohammad, and Sasikumar accepted, 20 minutes after he began hearing the script narration. Lavanya Tripathi played the female lead, in her Tamil debut. Naveen Chandra was cast after Sasikumar saw him in the Telugu film Andala Rakshasi (2012).

The film was prominently shot in Coimbatore. Scenes were also shot at Bharathiar University, Coimbatore. In October, the team consisting of Socrates, Sasikumar, Lavanya, dance choreographer Raju Sundaram along with a 40-member crew flew to Venice and other parts of Italy and Switzerland to shoot two songs. Padmapriya Janakiraman danced for "Vaada Vaada", a kuthu song which was shot on a set erected in Chennai and completed in two days.

== Soundtrack ==
The music was composed by Devi Sri Prasad. The audio launch was held on 30 January 2014.

Track listing
No.	Title	Lyrics	Singer(s)	Length
1.	"Vodu Vodu"	Yugabharathi	Chinnaponnu	2:15
2.	"Un Kannai Penne Nee Illammal"	Thamarai	Karthik, M. M. Manasi	3:50
3.	"Vaanathile Nilavirukkum"	Na. Muthukumar	Sooraj Santhosh	4:51
4.	"En Uyirin Uyiraga"	Viveka	Devi Sri Prasad, Anitha Karthikeyan	4:20
5.	"Vaada Vaada"	Viveka	M. L. R. Karthikeyan, Andrea Jeremiah	4:37
Total length:				19:53

== Release ==
Bramman was released in theatres on 21 February 2014. It had its television premiere on Sun TV on 2 October 2014, coinciding with Gandhi Jayanti and Ayudha Puja.

== Reception ==
Baradwaj Rangan wrote for The Hindu, "With someone else at its centre, we might have said that Bramman is just about watchable, but with Sasikumar, we begin to wonder if Subramaniyapuram was a one-off". Sify called Bramman a "passable commercial entertainer with all essential ingredients that will keep the pot boiling". S Saraswathi of Rediff.com wrote, "The first half is extremely slow and boring, while the second half is designed to include every possible scenario to highlight the many sacrifices that Shiva makes for his friend. There are many dramatic twists, yet the film lacks the depth, intensity and sentiment that we have come to expect from Sasikumar".

M. Suganth of The Times of India called it a "listless melodrama that tries to be a paean to both films and friendship", criticising it's "uninspiring" script and "TV serial-like" feel, but said Santhanam's wisecracks "keep us mildly entertained". Malini Mannath of The New Indian Express wrote, "The film is deeply disappointing with its meandering screenplay, slipshod narration and superficially crafted characters".
