= R. Velraj =

Indian filmmaker (born 1969)

- Born: Rajamani Velraj; Madurai, Tamil Nadu, India
- Occupations: Actor; Film director; cinematographer
- Years active: 2003-present
- Notable work: Aadukalam (2011)
- Parent: S Rajamani

Rajamani Velraj is an Indian cinematographer, director and writer who primarily works in Tamil and Hindi cinema. He is known for his long-standing collaborations with Vetrimaaran and M. Muthaiah.

== Personal life ==
Rajamani Velraj was born in the village Kootthiyar Kundu near Madurai, Tamil Nadu. He went to PKN Boys Higher Secondary School (Tirumangalam), and studied at Madurai Sourastra College.

== Career ==
Early in his career, he worked as an assistant to cinematographer Tirru in several Tamil films. After working with actor Dhanush in Parattai Engira Azhagu Sundaram, Dhanush recommended Velraj for his next film, Polladhavan, directed by then debutant, Vetrimaaran. He won the Vijay Award for Best Cinematographer in 2008. Velraj and Vetrimaaran continued working together, from Aadukalam to their most recent film, Viduthalai Part 1 (2023). He made his directional debut with Velaiilla Pattadhari, starring Dhanush and Amala Paul and with Anirudh as the music director. The film was extremely successful and became a cult film. In 2015, he directed his second film, Thanga Magan. Velraj is a member of the Indian Society of Cinematographers.

== Filmography ==
=== As cinematographer ===
Year	Title	Language	Notes
2003	Supari	Hindi	
2006	Phir Hera Pheri	Hindi	
2007	Parattai Engira Azhagu Sundaram	Tamil	
2007	Polladhavan	Tamil	
2008	Kabhi Bhi Kahin Bhi	Hindi	
2008	Malabar Wedding	Malayalam	
2010	Kandahar	Malayalam	Collaborated with Ravi Varman
2011	Aadukalam	Tamil	(Cameo appearance)
2011	Siruthai	Tamil	
2011	Engeyum Eppodhum	Tamil	Winner, Vikatan Award For Best Cinematographer
2012	3	Tamil	
2012	Savaari	Kannada	
2012	Leelai	Tamil	
2013	Naan Rajavaga Pogiren	Tamil	
2013	Ethir Neechal	Tamil	
2013	Udhayam NH4	Tamil	
2013	Naiyaandi	Tamil	
2014	Velaiyilla Pattathari	Tamil	(Cameo appearance)
2014	Poriyaalan	Tamil	(Cameo appearance)
2015	Komban	Tamil	(Cameo appearance)
2015	Vai Raja Vai	Tamil	
2015	Paayum Puli	Tamil	(Cameo appearance)
2015	Thanga Magan	Tamil	(Cameo appearance)
2016	Pugazh	Tamil	(Cameo appearance)
2016	Marudhu	Tamil	
2017	Power Paandi	Tamil	(Cameo appearance)
2018	Kadaikutty Singam	Tamil	(Cameo appearance)
2018	Vada Chennai	Tamil	(Cameo appearance)
2019	Dev	Tamil	
2019	Asuran	Tamil	(Cameo appearance)
2019	Sangathamizhan	Tamil	
2021	Pulikkuthi Pandi	Tamil	
2021	Udanpirappe	Tamil	
2022	Veerapandiyapuram	Tamil	
2022	The Legend	Tamil	
2022	Anel Meley Pani Thuli	Tamil	
2022	Pettaikaali	Tamil	TV series on Aha
2022	Kuttram Kuttrame	Tamil	
2023	Viduthalai Part 1	Tamil	
2023	Kathar Basha Endra Muthuramalingam	Tamil	
2024	Viduthalai Part 2	Tamil	(Cameo appearance)
2025	Single	Telugu	
2025	Phoenix	Tamil	
2026	Reporting Live	Hindi	
2027	Arasan	Tamil	Filming

=== As director ===
Year	Title	Language	Notes
2014	Velaiilla Pattadhari	Tamil	Winner, Edison Award for Best Debut Director; Nominated, Filmfare Award for Best Director – Tamil; Cameo as Traffic Police
2015	Thanga Magan	Tamil	Cameo as Ramalingam

=== As actor ===
- Aadukalam (2011) as police inspector
- Poriyaalan (2014)
- Velaiilla Pattadhari (2014)
- Komban (2015)
- Paayum Puli (2015)
- Thanga Magan (2015)
- Ithu Namma Aalu (2016)
- Pugazh (2016)
- Pa. Pandi (2017)
- Kadaikutty Singam (2018)
- Vada Chennai (2018)
- Kaalidas (2019)
- Asuran (2019)
- Udanpirappe (2021)
- Kuttram Kuttrame (2022)
- Viduthalai Part 1(2023)
- Viduthalai Part 2 (2024)

== Awards ==
- Vijay Award for Best Cinematographer for Pollathavan (2007)
- Filmfare Award for Best Cinematographer – South for Aadukalam (2011)
- SIIMA Award for Best Cinematographer for Aadukalam (2011)
- SIIMA Award for Best Debut Director for Velaiyilla Pattathari (2014)
- SIIMA Award for Best cinematographer for Asuran (2019)
- Vikatan Cinema Awards for Best cinematographer for Viduthalai Part 1 (2023)
- Tamil Nadu State Film Award : Best Cinematographer (2018) for Vada Chennai & Kadaikutty Singam.
