= Asuravadham =

2018 Indian Tamil-language film

- Theatrical release poster
- Directed by: Maruthupandian
- Written by: Maruthupandian
- Produced by: Leela Lalitkumar
- Starring: Sasikumar; Nandita Swetha
- Cinematography: S. R. Kathir
- Edited by: R. Govindaraj
- Music by: Govind Menon
- Production company: Seven Screen Studio
- Release date: 29 June 2018
- Running time: 122 minutes
- Country: India
- Language: Tamil

Asuravadham (transl. Demon vanquishing) is a 2018 Indian Tamil-language action thriller film written and directed by Maruthupandian, and produced by Leela Lalitkumar. It is based on rural areas. Govind Menon scored the music for the film, and cinematography is handled by S.R Kathiir. The film was earlier scheduled to have its theatrical release on 13 April 2018, coinciding with Puthandu, but was postponed to 29 June 2018 due to Kollywood strike, which resulted in a standoff between Nadigar Sangam and Digital Service Providers on the increase of VPF charges. The film had its theatrical release on 29 June and received mixed reviews from critics and audience and emerged as an average hit.

== Plot ==
Samayan gets a call from an anonymous person saying that he will die in one week. Then, a cat and mouse game begins between Samayan and the caller. After some time, the caller is revealed to be Saravana as he wanted to kill Samayan for raping and killing his daughter a few years back when Saravana was at work. At the end, Samayan and his allies trap Saravana and try to kill him, but Saravana escapes and kills all the allies. Samayan escapes but is stopped by Saravana, who has a shovel in his hands. Samayan is defeated, and whilst being buried alive by Saravana, he asks him who he is. Saravana says nothing and buries him. The movie ends with Saravana and his wife Maha going to their daughter's grave and Saravana leaving flowers on the grave.

== Cast ==
- Sasikumar as Saravana
- Nandita Swetha as Maha
- Vasumithra as Samayan
- Sheela Rajkumar as Kasthuri
- Namo Narayana as Alex
- Sreejith Ravi as Muthukalai
- Aadukalam Murugadoss
- Rajasimman
- Chella Muthaiah
- Attakathi Arumugam
- Dindigul Alex
- Baby Avaika

== Production ==
After the release of Kodiveeran in November 2017, Sasikumar announced his next project with director Maruthupandian who made his directorial debut in the 2015 film Chennai Ungalai Anbudan Varaverkirathu with the film titled as Asuravadham. Sasikumar chose to work with the director Maruthupandian while he was busy during shooting for his upcoming releases including Nadodigal 2, a sequel to the 2009 film Nadodigal. The film was shot in areas including Dindigul and Kodaikanal. The film also roped in Vasumithra, a poet turned actor who was known for his role in the film Kidaari. The project was wrapped up in February 2018 with 40 days of shooting while Sasikumar opted to work for Nadodigal 2 soon after wrapping up the shoot and the venture initially announced its release on 13 April 2018 but the release was delayed due to the Kollywood strike led by the Nadigar Sangam.

The official single titled Rattha Araathi was released by Nadodigal director Samuthirakani. The teaser of the film was officially released by popular director turned producer Gautham Vasudev Menon and the trailer of the film was released on 15 March 2018 by Vijay Sethupathi with both teaser and trailer of the film received positive reviews from the audience.

=== Home media ===
The satellite rights of the film were sold out to Sun TV.

== Release ==
Tamil Nadu theatrical rights of the film were sold for ₹6.5 crore. The film had its theatrical release on 29 June 2018 and received mixed reviews from the audience. The film was appreciated for portraying a suspense thriller gripping story during the first half of the film. But the film was criticised for not showcasing a perfect climax in the end which resulted in mixed reactions from audience.

== Controversy ==
The cinematographer of the film, S. R. Kathir, who was lauded for his cinematography, was also accused by the production company for meddling in the direction of the second half of the film instead of director Maruthupandian, which may have caused the film to have done average business at the box office.
