= Pulikkuthi Pandi =

2021 television film directed by Muthaiah

- Promotional poster
- Written by: M. Muthaiah
- Directed by: M. Muthaiah
- Starring: Vikram Prabhu; Lakshmi Menon
- Music by: N. R. Raghunanthan
- Country of origin: India
- Original language: Tamil

Production
- Producers: Kalanithi Maran; M. Muthaiah
- Cinematography: R. Velraj
- Editor: Venkat Raajen
- Running time: 145 minutes
- Production companies: M Studios; Sun Entertainment

Original release
- Network: Sun TV
- Release: 15 January 2021

Pulikkuthi Pandi is a 2021 Indian Tamil-language action drama television film produced, written and directed by M. Muthaiah. The film stars Lakshmi Menon, Vikram Prabhu and Singampuli, with Samuthrakani, R.K. Suresh, Vela Ramamoorthy and Sujatha Sivakumar in supporting roles. The music for the film was composed by N. R. Raghunanthan. It was released as a television premiere directly in Sun TV on 15 January 2021 coinciding with Pongal and Vikram Prabhu's birthday. This film marked Lakshmi Menon's comeback film after a 4-year hiatus from acting.

== Plot ==
In 2000, Sannasi Thevar begins issuing short-term loans to traders in a local market, threatening the business of the woman who holds the market lease. When she confronts him, Sannasi’s youngest and most violent son, Saravedi, murders her in public, enabling Sannasi to expand his criminal influence without resistance.

In 2019, Pulikkuthi Pandi, a young landowner known for confronting injustice, is frequently at odds with local authorities. During one arrest, he meets Seeni Servai, who has been detained for stabbing a con artist who swindled his sons, who are alcoholic gamblers. Pandi also meets Seeni’s daughter Pechi and quickly falls in love with her, although she disapproves of his aggressive behavior. After their release, Pandi approaches Seeni to propose marriage but is rejected by Pechi.

Seeni then reveals the truth about Pandi’s past. Years earlier, Pandi’s father Karumbalai Pandi, a respected activist, saved Seeni from a gangster. In the fight that followed, the gangster was mistakenly assumed to have been killed by Karumbalai. A corrupt police inspector used the incident to suppress Karumbalai’s activism, coercing Seeni into giving false testimony that led to a wrongful conviction. Karumbalai was executed, and Pandi’s mother died in shock, leaving young Pandi an orphan raised by an inept uncle. Determined to emulate his father’s ideals but hampered by a volatile temper, Pandi grew misunderstood by the villagers.

Moved by Seeni’s confession, Pechi agrees to marry Pandi if he abandons violence. Pandi attempts to find respectable work but is only offered jobs that require force, reinforcing his reputation. Vowing to change, he avoids conflict until he is forced to defend Pechi from a group of thugs. He soon learns they were hired by Sannasi, now a powerful crime lord in the nearby town of Sivagangai. Sannasi preys on Seeni's family through unpaid debts and is protected by his three older sons—a high-ranking police officer, a public prosecutor, and a political leader—while Saravedi remains feared as the clan’s most dangerous enforcer.

To free Seeni from debt, Pandi sells one of his ancestral homes to Sannasi and marries Pechi. Unbeknownst to them, Sannasi had planned to force Seeni into giving Pechi to Saravedi as repayment. When the marriage undermines his plan, Sannasi sends his mistress, Chittu, to live near Pandi’s home. After Pechi and her sister-in-law humiliate Chittu for proposing that the sister-in-law become Sannasi’s second mistress, Chittu manipulates Sannasi into escalating hostilities.

One night, a drunk Sannasi mistakenly enters Pechi’s home and attempts to assault her. Pandi helps drive him out. A newly appointed inspector, Ramanathan, seizes the opportunity to arrest Sannasi, hoping to dismantle the family’s criminal empire. Fearing that the arrest will expose decades of wrongdoing, the Thevar family offers reconciliation: if Pandi withdraws the case, they will return his ancestral property and grant him part of their land. Pandi agrees, and both families meet at the registrar’s office. After the documents are signed, Sannasi demands that Pandi bow down before him for forgiveness. As Pandi complies, Saravedi beheads him and parades the head through the village before surrendering.

That night, while Sannasi’s extended family celebrates at a temple festival, a bomb explosion triggers chaos. Pechi, her relatives, and Pandi’s friends use the confusion to kill Sannasi and his accompanying men. When Sannasi’s older sons learn of the killings, they attempt to capture Pechi but are cornered and killed one by one.

With Saravedi now the last surviving heir, the inspector attempts to protect him by transferring him to a safe house. Pechi, determined to avenge Pandi, intercepts the police van. Saravedi escapes his restraints and fights back, overpowering the group, but is eventually subdued and killed by Pechi.

== Cast ==
- Vikram Prabhu as Pulikuthi Pandi
- Lakshmi Menon as Pechi Pulikuthi Pandi
- Samuthirakani as Karumbalai Pandi, Pandi's father
- Singampuli as Pandi's uncle
- R. K. Suresh as Saravedi Thevar
- Vela Ramamoorthy as Sannasi Thevar, Saravedi Thevar's father
- R. Kaleeswaran as Seeni Servai, Pechi's father
- KPY Dheena as Pandi's friend
- KPY Bala as Pandi's friend
- Sujatha Sivakumar as Pandi's mother
- Aruldoss as DSP, Saravedi Thevar's brother
- Aadukalam Naren as Inspector M. Pattalathan
- G. Marimuthu as Inspector Dhananchezhiyan
- C. Prabathvarman as Aalavandhan
- Namo Narayana as Rajakili
- Meenal as Chittu
- Rajasimman as Inspector Karungali
- Stalin as Pechi's brother
- Veeran Selvaraj as Pechi's brother
- Madurai Janaki as Pechi's sister-in-law
- Ramya Shankar as Pechi's sister-in-law
- Velmurugan as Sarattai
- Hello Kandasamy as Selvaraj
- Avan Ivan Ramarajan as Pachamuthu
- Naveen Saravana Kumar as Vakil

== Production ==
The film was announced in September 2020 and the makers began production in the same month amid COVID-19 pandemic. Sun TV Network produced the film with a limited budget. The filmmakers initially titled the film as Pechi and began the principal photography, but was later changed to Pulikkuthi Pandi. The film project marked the second collaboration between Vikram Prabhu and Lakshmi Menon after Kumki (2012). It also marked the first film project for Menon in four years after her last film Rekka (2016). Most of the portions of the film were predominantly shot in Madurai and Dindigul.

Filming was completed during November 2020 at a time when Government of Tamil Nadu permitted theatres to open for public for the first time during the pandemic. The first look poster of the film was unveiled on 30 December 2020.

== Soundtrack ==
Pulikkuthi Pandi

Soundtrack album by N. R. Raghunanthan
- Released: 9 January 2021
- Recorded: 2020
- Genre: Feature film soundtrack
- Length: 24:15
- Language: Tamil
- Label: Sun Entertainment; Divo
- Producer: N. R. Raghunanthan

N. R. Raghunanthan chronology
Utraan (2020)	Pulikkuthi Pandi (2021)	Nayae Peyae (2021)

The film's soundtrack and score was composed by N. R. Raghunanthan. The album features six tracks with lyrics written by Mohan Rajan, Mani Amudhavan and Araikudi Bharathi Ganesan. It was released on 9 January 2021, six days before the film's release.

Track list
No.	Title	Lyrics	Singer(s)	Length
1.	"Gothavula"	Mohan Raj	Mahalingam	02:55
2.	"Yammadiyamma"	Mohan Raj	Jagadeesh Kumar	05:07
3.	"Venaam Madhu Pazhakkam"	Araikudi Bharathi Ganesan	Mahalingam	03:28
4.	"Sollamathan"	Mohan Raj	Srinisha Jayaseelan	04:58
5.	"Alangalankuruvi"	Mani Amudhan	Vandana Srinivasan, Lijesh Kumar	04:33
6.	"Alam Uzhuthupotten"	Araikudi Bharathi Ganesan	Mahalingam	03:17
Total length:				24:15

== Release ==
The filmmakers initially planned it for Christmas release on 25 December 2020 but was postponed due delays in post-production. The filmmakers again insisted that the film would be released initially in theatres on 1 January 2021 coinciding with the New Year which also taunted to be the first Tamil film release of 2021 but the theatrical release was cancelled in the last minute due to delays in post-production. The film release was later finalised as a direct-to-television premiere via Sun TV on 15 January 2021 as a Pongal release and subsequently the film would be streamed via digital platform Sun NXT. It became the second film to directly premiere via Sun TV after Naanga Romba Busy (2020).

== Reception ==
=== Critical response ===
Avinash Ramachandran of Cinema Express rated the film 3 stars out of 5 stars and said, "proverbial climactic twist saves this generic film". Thinkal Menon of The Times of India rated 2.5 out of 5 stars and said, "The action scenes in the latter half (though violent), cinematography and performances lift the film to a good extent till the climax. All the artists pull off their roles with ease – while Lakshmi Menon, Vela Ramamoorthy and RK Suresh stand out." Baradwaj Rangan wrote for Film Companion, "Muthaiah has a good head for plot, but his screenwriting – the way he fleshes out these plot points – is like what you’d find in a TV serial...there’s no flavour in the lines. There’s no life in the performances."

=== Ratings ===
The film which had a direct TV premiere on Sun TV garnered a viewership of 13.284 million impressions and a rating of 17.05 TVR becoming the most watched Tamil television program in that week.
