= Namo Narayana =

Indian actor (born 1970)

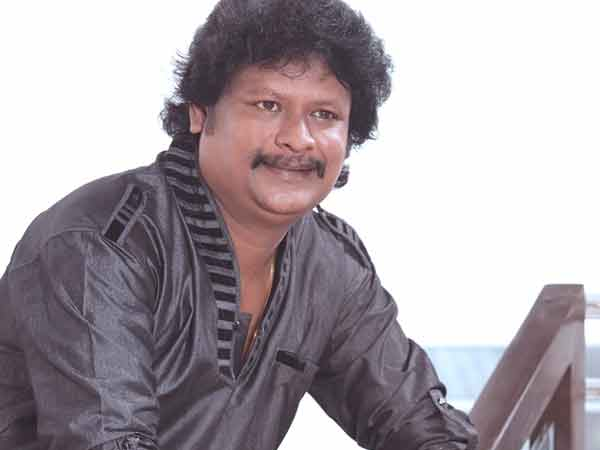
- Born: 18 May 1970 (age 56); Madurai, Tamil Nadu, India
- Other name: Namo Narayanan
- Occupation: Actor
- Years active: 2007–present

Namo Narayana is an Indian actor who primarily works in Tamil films. He made a breakthrough as an actor with his performances in Naadodigal (2009) and Komban (2015) and received widespread positive reception for his comedic performance in Jailer 2 (2026).

== Career ==
Narayana was a software engineer who worked in Bahrain, Dubai and Malaysia before he chose to star in a supporting role in Samuthirakani's Naadodigal (2009). He was close friend of Samuthirakani during bachelor days. Post-release, he became a close friend of the lead actor Sasikumar, and has often collaborated in their films, such as Easan (2010), Poraali (2011), Kutti Puli (2013) and Nimirndhu Nil (2014). In 2015, Narayana described his role in Komban as a breakthrough role in his career at the film's press meet. He played one of the lead roles in Appa (2016). He played the antagonist in Thondan (2017).

== Filmography ==
- Naadodigal (2009)
- Easan (2010)
- Mudhal Idam (2010)
- Poraali (2011)
- Ishtam (2011)
- Thappana (2012; Malayalam)
- Kedi Billa Killadi Ranga (2012)
- Kutti Puli (2013)
- Kallapetty (2013)
- Veeran Muthurakku (2014)
- Nimirndhu Nil (2014)
- Tenaliraman (2014)
- Yaamirukka Bayamey (2014)
- Manam Konda Kadhal (2015)
- Janda Pai Kapiraju (2015; Telugu)
- Komban (2015)
- Kaaval (2015)
- Vaalu (2015)
- Pasanga 2 (2015)
- Metro (2016)
- Rajini Murugan (2016)
- Navarasa Thilagam (2016)
- Marudhu (2016)
- Appa (2016)
- Vaaimai (2016)
- Aandavan Kattalai (2016)
- Kodi (2016)
- Nagarvalam (2017)
- Enga Amma Rani (2017)
- Thondan (2017)
- Podhuvaga Emmanasu Thangam (2017)
- Hara Hara Mahadevaki (2017)
- Guru Uchaththula Irukkaru (2017)
- Asuravadham (2018)
- Viswasam (2019)
- Gurkha (2019)
- Dagaalty (2020) as Malli's brother-in-law
- Naadodigal 2 (2019)
- Dharala Prabhu (2020)
- Ka Pae Ranasingam (2020)
- Pulikkuthi Pandi (2021)
- Vettai Naai (2021)
- Sulthan (2021)
- Vinodhaya Sitham (2021)
- Udanpirappe (2021)
- MGR Magan (2021)
- Raajavamsam (2021)
- Anandham Vilayadum Veedu (2021)
- Kallan (2022)
- Kaatteri (2022)
- Pistha (2022)
- Yugi (2022)
- Naan Mirugamaai Maara (2022)
- Kaari (2022)
- Therkathi Veeran (2022)
- Mr Daddy (2022)
- Nanpakal Nerathu Mayakkam (2023; Malayalam)
- Kudimahaan (2023)
- Pathu Thala (2023)
- Azhagiya Kanne (2023)
- License (2023)
- Conjuring Kannappan (2023)
- Tik Tok (2023)
- Oru Thavaru Seidhal (2024)
- Aranmanai 4 (2024)
- Akkaran (2024)
- Raayan (2024) as Jagannathan
- Badava (2025)
- Niram Marum Ulagil (2025)
- Antha 7 Naatkal (2025)
- Lucky the Superstar (2026)
- Karuppu (2026) as Thaniga
- Jailer 2 (2026) as Pazhakkadai Moorthy
