= Komban =

2015 Indian film by M. Muthaiah

- Directed by: M. Muthaiah
- Written by: M. Muthaiah
- Produced by: K. E. Gnanavel Raja; S. R. Prakashbabu; S R Prabhu
- Starring: Karthi; Lakshmi Menon
- Cinematography: Velraj
- Edited by: Praveen K. L.
- Music by: G. V. Prakash Kumar
- Production company: Studio Green
- Distributed by: Dream Factory
- Release date: 2 April 2015
- Running time: 136 minutes
- Country: India
- Language: Tamil

Komban is a 2015 Indian Tamil-language action drama film directed by M. Muthaiah and produced by Studio Green. The film stars Karthi in the title role with Lakshmi Menon, Rajkiran, Super Subbarayan, Thambi Ramaiah, Karunas, and Kovai Sarala playing supporting roles. G. V. Prakash Kumar composed the film's music. The film released on 2 April 2015 to positive reviews.

== Plot ==
Kombiah Pandian alias Komban is a good-hearted but short-tempered man living in a village with his mother Kottaiamma in Ramanathapuram. Komban cannot tolerate injustice in any form and repels against it immediately without fearing about its after effects. Komban falls in love with Pazhani, the only daughter of Muthiah. Kottaiamma approaches Muthiah with a wedding proposal between their children. Muthiah agrees for the wedding seeing Komban's kind heart, but fears that Komban's angry issues would make him land in problems. Despite this, Komban and Pazhani get married. One day, Komban locks horns with a corrupt politician named Gundan Ramasamy and trouble erupts between them. Muthiah is even more worried, knowing that this would put Komban's life at risk. Ramasamy kidnaps Pazhani with the plans of bringing Komban to his place, but Muthiah sees this and hits at Ramasamy and his men. During a temple festival, Ramasamy and his men decide attacks Komban and Muthiah, but Komban kills Ramasamy and saves Muthiah.

== Cast ==
- Karthi as Kombaiah Pandian a.k.a. Komban
- Lakshmi Menon as Pazhani, Kombaiah Pandian's wife
- Rajkiran as Muthaiyah, Pazhani's father
- Super Subbarayan as Gundan Ramasamy
- Thambi Ramaiah as Rajakili, Kottaiamma's and Muthaiyya's Youngest brother
- Karunas as Muniyandi, Kombaiah Pandian's Cousin
- Kovai Sarala as Kottaiamma, Kombaiah Pandian's mother, Muthaiyya's younger sister
- I. M. Vijayan as Muthukalai, Gundan Ramasamy's elder son
- Sai Dheena as Santhanakalai, Gundan Ramasamy's second son
- Arunmozhithevan as Rajakali, Gundan Ramasamy's youngest son
- G. Gnanasambandam as Magistrate
- Vela Ramamoorthy as Duraipandi
- Veerasamar as Amavasai
- G. Marimuthu as Pattasu
- Namo Narayana
- George Maryan as Tea Master
- Maha Gandhi as Bhairava
- Stalin as Inspector Inbanathan
- Hello Kandasamy as Constable
- Guru as Alangaram
- Yogi Babu as First Man in Fight
- Rajasimman
- Dharani Vasudevan
- Rajalingam
- Padman
- Baba Bhaskar (special appearance in the song "Karuppu Nerathazhagi")

== Production ==
Studio Green announced that their next production would start from June 2014 with M. Muthaiah of Kutti Puli (2013) fame taking charge of the direction and that the film would feature Karthi in a rural based role for the second time following his debut film Paruthiveeran (2007). Yuvan Shankar Raja was initially reported to be composing the film's score and soundtrack, but he was replaced with G. V. Prakash Kumar in July 2014. Velraj handled the film's cinematography. Praveen K. L. was selected to be the film's editor. Sri Divya was first reported to be the female lead, but the role went to Lakshmi Menon, who also was the maker's first choice, while Rajkiran was selected to play a pivotal role. Stunt choreographer Super Subbarayan was cast for an antagonistic role. Malayalam actor and former footballer I. M. Vijayan was chosen to portray another villain in the film. Comedian Karunas and character artist Thambi Ramaiah were added to the cast as well.

The team announced that the film would be a start-to-finish affair and the film's shoots would be wrapped up in 70 days' time. Principal photography took place on 18 June 2014. Karthi's father, actor Sivakumar attended the event. Karthi was reported to have grown a handlebar moustache and beard for his character. He also put on weight for the role. Most of the scenes were also shot at Mudukulathur. 50% of the film was completed by early October 2014.

== Soundtrack ==
Komban

Soundtrack album by G. V. Prakash Kumar
- Released: 5 March 2015
- Genre: Film soundtrack
- Length: 22:56
- Labels: Green Audio; Divo
- Producer: G. V. Prakash Kumar

G. V. Prakash Kumar chronology
Rajathanthiram (2015)	Komban (2015)	Idhu Enna Maayam (2015)

G. V. Prakash Kumar composed the soundtrack album and background score for the film, the third time he collaborated with Karthi, after Aayirathil Oruvan (2010) and Saguni (2012). Shreya Ghoshal recorded a song in the film. The lyrics were written by Ra. Thanikodi and Mahalingam.

Track listing
No.	Title	Singer(s)	Length
1.	"Kambikara Vetti"	Ananthu, V. M. Mahalingam	5:00
2.	"Appappa"	Shreya Ghoshal, G. V. Prakash Kumar	5:44
3.	"Karuppu Nerathazhagi"	Velmurugan, Maalavika Sundar	4:31
4.	"Mella Valanjadhu"	Madhu Balakrishnan	4:21
5.	"Celebration" (Komban Theme)	G. V. Prakash Kumar	3:20
Total length:			22.56

== Release ==
The satellite rights of the film were sold to Sun TV. The Hindi dubbed version titled Daringbaaz 2 was released in 2017.

== Reception ==
The film received positive reviews from critics.

M. Suganth of The Times of India gave 2.5 stars out of 5 and wrote, "The problem, though, is not the similarity of the characters or predictability of the plot, but the lack of real excitement in most of the scenes…The film hums along, moving from one scene to the next, without really making much of an impact in the viewer". Gautaman Bhaskaran of The Hindustan Times rated 3 out of 5 and wrote, "Komban is an endless roll of flashing knives and gritting teeth…Komban is hardly worth the time or money". Baradwaj Rangan of The Hindu wrote, "Komban: So dull...that's the real controversy". Filmibeat rated the film 3 stars out of 5, writing, "Packed with all the elements required for a successful commercial entertainer, Komban delivers the goods." Indiaglitz rated the film 3.25 stars out of 5, calling it "a raging bull".

The movie was heavily criticized by K. Krishnasamy the leader of the Dalit party Puthiya Tamilagam and many Dalit political leaders for its glorification of caste and was accused of fomenting intercaste violence in the state of Tamilnadu.
