= Udanpirappe =

2021 Indian drama film

- Official release poster
- Directed by: Era. Saravanan
- Written by: Era. Saravanan
- Produced by: Suriya; Jyothika
- Starring: Jyothika; M. Sasikumar; Samuthirakani
- Cinematography: R. Velraj
- Edited by: Ruben
- Music by: D. Imman
- Production company: 2D Entertainment
- Distributed by: Amazon Prime Video
- Release date: 14 October 2021
- Country: India
- Language: Tamil

Udanpirappe (transl. My sibling) is a 2021 Indian Tamil-language action drama film written and directed by Era. Saravanan. Produced by Suriya and Jyothika via 2D Entertainment, it stars Jyothika, M. Sasikumar and Samuthirakani in lead roles, while Soori and Kalaiyarasan play supporting roles. The film features music composed by D. Imman, while cinematography and editing were handled respectively by R. Velraj and Ruben. It was released for streaming through the digital platform Amazon Prime Video on 14 October 2021. The film received mixed to positive reviews from critics and was also Jyothika's 50th film.

== Plot ==
Vairavan and Mathangi are loving brother and sister in the village of Vengaivasal. The opening scene starts with two kids running. One falls into a well and dies.

One of the villagers comes to Vairavan’s house and seeks help as his tractor is missing and says the police were disrespectful to him. Vairavan's wife Maragathavalli assures him that Vairavan will help. Then we can see that hitmen were hired to kill Vairavan. He beats them up for killing a dog without knowing they came to kill him. It is established that Vairavan is a village don and a respected wealthy man who does good for everyone in the village. Mathangi and her husband Sargunam, a school teacher, are introduced as a loving couple. Sargunam does not speak to Vairavan due to differences in their philosophies. Sargunam believes that everyone must go to court and not resort to violence like Vairavan.

Vairavan’s son Vivek is studying in the US, and when he returns to visit the village, he meets Sargunam and reprimands him, saying he does not need his family. In the flashback, it is revealed that the two kids who earlier fell in the well were Sargunam's son and Vivek. Mathangi sees them and jumps to save them. She cannot save both, so she sacrifices her son to save Vivek. Sargunam blames Vairavan for his son's death, believing his influence made him fall into the well. Mathangi loves Vairavan and vows to unite the two men and speak to Vairavan only when her husband speaks to him.

Meanwhile, they propose to ally with the two families through the marriage of Vivek to Sargunam’s daughter Keerthana. When the marriage is about to occur, Keerthana is stabbed, and Sargunam blames Vairavan's violence for it again, as neither he nor Keerthana has enemies.

Vairavan deduces that the person who stabbed his niece is Adhiban, who acts like a good man to the villagers but actually has bad intentions and is a serial sexual assaulter. Vairavan is being searched by the police for beating up people. Sargunam provides information to the police about Vairavan’s whereabouts near Adhiban’s house. Mathangi visits Adhiban’s house and kills him as he tries to molest her. She learns that he also sexually assaulted Keerthana before stabbing her. The reason for stabbing her was Sargunam’s case on his borewell. Vairavan disposes of his body.

Sargunam learns of all this and understands his brother-in-law and the families unite.

== Cast ==
- Jyothika as Maathangi Sargunam (Voice dubbed by Deepa Venkat)
- M. Sasikumar as Vengaivasal Vairavan
- Samuthirakani as Sargunam Vaathiyaar
- Soori as Pakkadi
- Kalaiyarasan as Adhiban
- Sidhaarth K T as Vivek Vairavan
- Nivedhithaa Sathish as Keerthana Sargunam
- Sija Rose as Maragathavalli Vairavan (Voice dubbed by Uma Maheswari)
- Vela Ramamoorthy as Maathangi and Vairavan's cousin
- Deepa Shankar as Vairavan's sister-in-law
- Aadukalam Naren as Peruthulasi
- Namo Narayana as MLA
- R. Velraj as Inspector Rajavel Pandi
- Caravan Arunachalam
- Vengaivaasal Makkal

== Production ==
Post-completion of Ponmagal Vandhal, Jyothika was reported to act in another production of Suriya's 2D Entertainment. The film, directed by Era. Saravanan of Kaththukutti (2015) fame, began production on 28 November 2019 with M. Sasikumar and Samuthirakani joining the shoot. Jyothika and Sasikumar reportedly played the role of siblings in the film, while Samuthirakani plays Jyothika's husband. Nivedhithaa Sathish essayed the role of Jyothika's daughter in the film. Speaking to The Times of India, Saravanan said it is "a village-based script that throws light on why it’s important to nurture relationships". Composer D. Imman, cinematographer R. Velraj and editor Ruben, also joined the technical crew.

Following the launch ceremony in Chennai, the film began production on 29 November, with shooting took place on Thanjavur and Pudukkottai. The shooting of the film wrapped before March 2020, prior to the COVID-19 lockdown in India, but post-production came to halt and was resumed lately after lockdown relaxations.

== Awards and nominations ==
- JFW Movie Awards for Best Actress - Lead Role for Jyothika - Nominated
- Filmfare Award for Best Actress – Tamil for Jyothika - Nominated
- Filmfare Award for Best Supporting Actress – Tamil for Nivedhithaa Sathish - Nominated

== Music ==
D. Imman composed the film's soundtrack. This film marks his first collaboration with Era. Saravanan and Jyothika and third collaboration with Sasikumar after Vetrivel and Kennedy Club.

Udanpirappe

Soundtrack album by D. Imman
- Released: 2021
- Genre: Feature film soundtrack
- Length: 23:59
- Language: Tamil
- Label: Sony Music India
- Producer: D. Imman

D. Imman chronology
| Laabam (2021) | Udanpirappe (2021) | Annaatthe (2021) |

Singles from Udanpirappe
- 1. "Anney Yaaranney" Released: 7 October 2021; 2. "Othapana Kaatteri" Released: 11 October 2021

| No. | Title | Lyrics | Singer(s) | Length |
|---|---|---|---|---|
| 1. | "Anney Yaaranney" | Yugabharathi | Shreya Ghoshal | 3:36 |
| 2. | "Othapana Kaatteri" | Yugabharathi | Sid Sriram | 3:44 |
| 3. | "Deivam Neethaaney" | Yugabharathi | Pavithra Chari | 4:32 |
| 4. | "Karambakudi Kanaga" | Snehan | Nithyasree Mahadevan, Jayamoorthy | 4:15 |
| 5. | "Yenge Yen Ponmaalai" | Yugabharathi | Arya Dhayal | 4:03 |
| 6. | "Anney Yaaranney" (Reprise) | Yugabharathi | Shreya Ghoshal | 3:48 |

== Release ==
Udanpirappe was released directly on Amazon Prime Video on 14 October 2021 as a part of 2D Entertainment's four-film deal with the streaming service.

== Reception ==
M Suganth of The Times of India gave 2.5/5 stars, saying that the film's theme was similar to previous films such as Pasamalar (1961), Kizhakku Cheemayile (1993), and Namma Veettu Pillai (2019), but also wrote, "The problem with the film is that the central brother-sister relationship isn't punch enough to make us care, unlike in the previous films." Behindwoods gave the film 2.5/5 stars and wrote, "If you're someone who loves family dramas so much, this will definitely work for you."

Ashameera Aiyappan of Firstpost wrote, "Udanpirappe aspires to be an emotional family drama that speaks about the importance of family. And there is potential to be one too. But its emotional inconsistency and superficiality restrict it to be a rehash of an age old-narrative." Haricharan Pudipeddi of The Hindustan Times wrote, "Despite the daily soap hangover, the film manages to touch all the right chords and make for a decent viewing."

Sowmya Rajendran of The News Minute wrote, "Udanpirappe becomes exhausting with unnecessary and predictable twists that make the film longer than it needs to be. If only it had been less invested in lecturing to the audience or trying to wring out tears and aimed to tell a story about families the way they are — warts and all — it would have been far more entertaining and honest." Ranjani Krishankumar of Film Companion wrote, "Grandstanding dialogues, relationships without connections and a convoluted climax sequence make this film barely passable."
