= Kathar Basha Endra Muthuramalingam =

2023 film directed by M. Muthaiya

- Theatrical Release poster
- Directed by: M. Muthaiah
- Written by: M. Muthaiah
- Produced by: Vedikkaranpatti. S. Sakthivel
- Starring: Arya; Siddhi Idnani; Prabhu; K. Bhagyaraj
- Cinematography: R. Velraj
- Edited by: Venkat Raajen
- Music by: G. V. Prakash Kumar
- Production companies: Zee Studios; Drumsticks Productions
- Release date: 2 June 2023
- Running time: 153 minutes
- Country: India
- Language: Tamil

Kathar Basha Endra Muthuramalingam (transl. Muthuramalingam alias Kathar Basha) is a 2023 Indian Tamil-language action drama film written and directed by M. Muthaiah, and produced by Zee Studios and Vedikkaranapatti. S. Sakthivel under Drumsticks Productions. The film stars Arya, Siddhi Idnani, Prabhu, and K. Bhagyaraj, while B. S. Avinash, Aadukalam Naren, Madhusudhan Rao, and Singampuli play supporting roles. The soundtrack and score for the film are composed by G. V. Prakash Kumar, while the cinematography and editing are handled by R. Velraj and Venkat Raajen.

Kathar Basha Endra Muthuramalingam was released on 2 June 2023 and received mixed reviews from critics.

== Plot ==
Tamizhselvi is a villager in Ramanathapuram district who is pressured by her relatives into marrying one of her uncle's sons in order to inherit her wealth, but she refuses, and the relatives try to corner her with the help of the villagers. With no choice, Tamizhselvi goes to prison in search of a person named Kathar Basha alias Mutharamalingam but leaves after seeing her relatives. Kathar learns that Tamizhselvi came to meet him. He gets released from prison and sets out to meet her. Kathar also learns about Tamizhselvi's family condition and also learns that her uncle Kaluvan, who is also the village chieftain, is actually the person who saved Kathar's life in an attack.

Kathar sets out to protect Tamizhselvi from her relatives and beats her uncle's sons. To repay debts, Kathar tries to find a suitable groom for Tamizhselvi, but to no avail. Kathar learns that he is actually Kaluvan's son and Kaluvan was forced to be the chieftain of the village due to various circumstances, where he also abandoned his wife and Kathar was raised by Kaluvan's friend Kathar Basha. After this, Kathar and Tamizhselvi fall in love and get married. One night, Kathar is attacked by unknown henchmen, but he defeats them. It is revealed that the attack was orchestrated by Vedigundu Veliyan.

Veliyan's father, Veriyandi, wanted to become the chairman, but Kathar Basha had become the chairman in order to thwart Veriyandi's plans. During a dispute, Veriyandi slapped Kathar Basha and humiliated him. Having learnt this, Kathar chopped off Veriyandi's leg and hand, which led to his imprisonment, and Veliyan swore to finish Kathar. Later, Tamizhselvi's relatives join forces with Veliyan to finish Kathar. Tamizhselvi donates half of the wealth to her relatives in order to take custody of her deceased brother's children. During a bhoomi pooja, Veliyan kills Tamizhselvi by planting a bomb on the land. Enraged, Kathar kills Tamizhselvi's relatives and Veliyan, thus avenging Tamizhselvi's death.

== Cast ==
- Arya as Muthuramalingam alias Kathar Basha
- Siddhi Idnani as Tamizhselvi, Kather's lover and later his wife
- Prabhu as Kathar Basha, Muthuramalingam's adopted father
- K. Bhagyaraj as Kaluvan, Muthuramalingam's biological father
  - Mahendran as young Kaluvan
- B. S. Avinash as Vettaiyan Vagaira
- Aadukalam Naren as Veriyandi
- Madhusudhan Rao as Venghaiyan Vagaira
- Renuka as Ayesha, Kathar Basha's wife and Muthuramalingam's adopted mother
- Tamizh as Vedigundu Veyilan
- Singampuli as Head Constable
- RJ Vigneshkanth as Paganeri Karuppu
- Monica Siva as Tamizhselvi's sister
- Hemadayal as Beevi alias Pechi, Kathar Basha and Ayesha's daughter
- P. L. Thenappan
- Rajesh
- Deepa Shankar
- Tarun Gopi
- Viji Chandrasekhar
- Sreejith Ravi
- R. K. Vijay Murugan
- Arjai
- Jai Bhim Rajendran as Tamizhselvi's friend
- Bala Hasan
- Indumathy Manikandan
- Nandha Saravanan

== Production ==
=== Development ===
In early July 2022, Arya was reported to team up with M. Muthaiya for his next project after the former finishes his commitments to Captain and the latter finishes his to Viruman, which both was in post-production works at the time. The project was reported to be funded by Vedikkaranpatti S. Sakthivel under Drumstick Production, the principal photography was reported to commence in August that year and R. Velraj would be the cinematographer. On 10 October, the project was officially announced by Drumstick Production, who co-produced it with Zee Studios. It was tentatively titled as Arya 34, as it is Arya's 34th film in the lead role. A traditional muhurat puja was held in Chennai, with stills releasing the same day as the announcement. G. V. Prakash Kumar would compose the score, while Velraj and Veeramani would handle the cinematography and production design, respectively. On 10 December, the official title of the film was unveiled as Kathar Basha Endra Muthuramalingam by 8 prominent Indian celebrities such as Gautham Vasudev Menon, Vishal, Karthi, Santhanam, Jiiva, Arun Vijay, R. Madhavan and Venkat Prabhu.

=== Casting ===
Siddhi Idnani, who made her Tamil debut through Vendhu Thanindhathu Kaadu (2022), was cast in as the female lead opposite Arya. B. S. Avinash (in his Tamil debut), R. K. Vijay Murugan, Madhusudhan Rao, and Tamizh were announced to be a part of cast. They played the role as antagonists. Veteran actors Prabhu and K. Bhagyaraj were cast to play important roles. Singampuli, Renuka, Aadukalam Naren, and Viji Chandrasekhar would appear in other pivotal roles.

=== Filming ===
Principal photography commenced on 9 November 2022, with the first schedule in Kovilpatti. The schedule was halted due to heavy rain in the state, but continued a week after.

== Soundtrack ==
Kathar Basha Endra Muthuramalingam

Soundtrack album by G. V. Prakash Kumar
- Released: 5 May 2023
- Recorded: 2022–2023
- Genre: Feature film soundtrack
- Language: Tamil
- Label: Junglee Music
- Producer: G. V. Prakash Kumar

G. V. Prakash Kumar chronology
Boo (2023)	Kathar Basha Endra Muthuramalingam (2023)	Aneethi (2023)

Singles from Kathar Basha Endra Muthuramalingam
- 1. "Dowlathana Rowdy" Released: 13 April 2023; 2. "Karikuzhambu Vaasam" Released: 16 May 2023

The soundtrack and score are composed by G. V. Prakash Kumar. in his Fourth collaboration with Arya after Oram Po, Madrasapattinam and Raja Rani and second collaboration with Muthaiya after Komban.

Track listing
No.	Title	Lyrics	Singer(s)	Length
1.	"Dowlathana Rowdy"	Logan; Junior Nithya	G. V. Prakash Kumar; Logan	3:39
2.	"Karikuzhambu Vaasam"	Junior Nithya	G. V. Prakash Kumar	3:54
3.	"Yengaamal Ettu Vai"	Karumathur Manimaran	Saindhavi	3:07
4.	"Adi Kalli Kadey"	Thanikodi	Adithya RK	2:01
5.	"Ooru Ellam Maavolai"	Thanikodi	Senthil Ganesh; Sinduri Vishal	5:14
6.	"Ongu Thangu Karrupuswamy"	Thanikodi	Velmurugan; Guru	3:59

== Marketing ==
A teaser trailer of the film released on 31 March 2023, on the occasion of Indian Premier League (IPL) beginning that day.

== Release ==
=== Theatrical ===
The film was released on 2 June 2023.

=== Home media ===
The satellite and digital rights of the film were acquired by Zee Tamil and ZEE5. The film is scheduled for a world digital premiere on 7 July 2023.

== Reception ==
Kathar Basha Endra Muthuramalingam received mixed reviews from critics.

=== Critical reception ===
Navein Darshan of Cinema Express gave 3 out of 5 stars and wrote "Time and again Muthaiya has proven his mastery in creating such powerful characters and moments in his films, and he is also honing his technical prowess with every project" Bhuvanesh Chandar of The Hindu wrote "The way Muthaiya structures his screenplay should have worked in another film but what it amounts to, other than the flimsy conflict, isn't worth all that effort."

Logesh Balachandran of The Times of India gave 2.5 out of 5 stars and wrote "Kathar Basha Engira Muthuramalingam brings nothing new to the table and ultimately ends up as an average offering from Muthaiah." Bharathy Singaravel of The News Minute gave 1 out of 5 stars and wrote "The villainy of these legions of antagonists in the film is by no means a criticism of real-life violence by Thevars."
