= MGR Magan =

2021 film by Ponram

- Official release poster
- Directed by: Ponram
- Written by: Ponram
- Produced by: Sundar Arumugam
- Starring: M. Sasikumar; Sathyaraj; Mirnalini Ravi
- Cinematography: Vinoth Rathinasamy
- Edited by: Vivek Harshan
- Music by: Anthony Daasan
- Production company: Screen Scene Media Entertainment
- Distributed by: Disney+ Hotstar
- Release date: 4 November 2021
- Country: India
- Language: Tamil

MGR Magan (transl. MGR's son) is a 2021 Indian Tamil-language masala film written and directed by Ponram and produced by Screen Scene Media Entertainment. The film stars M. Sasikumar, Sathyaraj and Mirnalini Ravi in lead roles and the music is composed by Anthony Daasan. Shot between September and November 2019, it was released on 4 November 2021 on Disney+ Hotstar after delays due to the COVID-19 pandemic in India.

== Cast ==
- M. Sasikumar as Anbalipu Ravi
- Sathyaraj as M. G. Ramasamy
- Mirnalini Ravi as Anu Priya
- Samuthirakani as Agnishwaran
- Saranya Ponvannan as Rasathi
- Rajeshwari as M. G. Ramasamy's wife
- Munishkanth as Vettupuli
- Singampuli as M. G. Karuppusamy
- Pala. Karuppiah as K. R. Thangavel
- Junior MGR as Raghu, K. R. Thangavel's son
- Motta Rajendran as Mattapparai
- Redin Kingsley as Saravana
- Namo Narayana as MLA (Meghanathan Loganathan Azhaganathan)
- G. Marimuthu as Police Officer
- Vinodhini Vaidyanathan as Judge
- Bijili Ramesh as Drunk Man
- Supergood Subramani
- Nandita Swetha as herself in "Jilla Asanthu Nikkum" song

== Production ==
Principal photography began on 25 September 2019 and the first schedule of the film took place in Theni. Initially Sathyaraj's role was offered to Rajkiran, who declined the offer due to the schedule conflicts with Shylock (2020). Filming was completed in late November 2019.

== Soundtrack ==
The soundtrack and score are composed by Anthony Daasan.

MGR Magan

Soundtrack album by Anthony Daasan
- Released: 2021
- Genre: Feature film soundtrack
- Length: 15:08
- Language: Tamil
- Label: Sony Music India

Anthony Daasan chronology
Uriyadi (2016)	MGR Magan (2021)	Kuiko (2023)

Track listing
No.	Title	Lyrics	Singer(s)	Length
1.	"Jilla Asanthu Nikkum"	Yugabharathi	Meenakshi Elayaraja	3:54
2.	"Kelappu Kelappu"	Muragan Manthiram	Anthony Daasan, Pooja Vaidyanath	3:47
3.	"Kingini Kingini"	Anthony Daasan	Ranjith, Srinidhi	3:33
4.	"Yereduthu Paakkama"	Murugan Manthiram	Anthony Daasan, Pooja Vaidyanath	3:54

== Release ==
MGR Magan was cleared by the censor board on 28 August 2020. The film was initially planned for theatrical release on Diwali the same year, but was postponed due to the delay in theatres reopening from the COVID-19 pandemic in India. The trailer of the film was released on 14 November 2020. In late November 2020, the team was planning to push the film for the Christmas release but it didn't happen. Later the film makers announced the film will be released on 23 April 2021 with the 50% occupancy in the theatres but was forced to postpone the release again due to the new lockdown restrictions imposed by the Tamil Nadu government ahead of COVID-19-second wave in India. In October 2021, the theatrical release was cancelled in favour of a direct-to-streaming release on Disney+ Hotstar, on 4 November 2021.

== Reception ==
Vishal Menon of Film Companion wrote, "The father-son conflict in MGR Magan is neither pushed hard enough to make things funny nor does it succeed in creating tension." IANS gave a rating of 2.5 out on 5 and wrote, "Ponram's 'MGR Magan' isn't bad. But it also doesn't provide us the kind of fun that his [Ponram] earlier films have made us expect of him." Avinash Ramachandran from Cinema Express gave a rating of 2 out on 5 and wrote, "MGR Magan manages to be is a rickety ride in a defunct carnival that had clearly seen better days."
