= G. Gnanasambandan =

Indian Tamil scholar, orator, actor

- Born: Gnanasambandan Gurunathan
- Occupations: Tamil scholar; orator; actor
- Website: gnanasambandan.in

Gnanasambandan Gurunathan (born 19 October 1955), also known as G. Gnanasambandan, is an Indian professor, Tamil scholar, orator and an actor who appears in Tamil films. He frequently chairs Tamil debate shows (Pattimandrams). Dr G Gnanasambandan is originally from Sholavandan of Madurai district. He was a Professor of Tamil-language at Thiagarajar College, Madurai.

== Filmography ==
=== Films ===
List of G. Gnanasambandan film credits
Year	Title	Role	Notes
2004	Virumaandi	Jallikattu commentator	
2006	Idhaya Thirudan	Mahesh's father	
2006	Kaivantha Kalai		
2008	Aayudham Seivom	Judge	
2009	Siva Manasula Sakthi	Sakthi's father	
2010	Pugaippadam	College principal	
2011	Poraali	House owner	
2013	Kutti Puli	Tailor	
2013	Mathil Mel Poonai	Divya's father	
2014	Bramman	Siva's father	
2014	Nimirndhu Nil	Minister	
2014	Vallavanukku Pullum Aayudham	Cycle (voice)	
2014	Kerala Nattilam Pengaludane	Thamizh Mani	
2015	Komban	Magistrate	
2015	Uthama Villain	Kaakaapu Sundar	
2015	Pasanga 2	Headmaster	
2016	Rajini Murugan	Malligarajan	
2016	Marudhu	Tahsildar	
2016	Thodari	Sadhasivam	
2016	Parandhu Sella Vaa	Sampath's father	
2017	Kanavu Variyam	Gnansambandham	
2017	Aarambamey Attakasam		
2017	Thondan	Pandiyanar	
2017	Kadaisi Bench Karthi	Judge, Nithya's father	
2017	Kodiveeran	Marriage broker	
2018	Vidhi Madhi Ultaa	Aditya's father	
2018	Aaruthra	Shiva's uncle	
2018	Sandakozhi 2	Sembaruthi's father	
2019	Bigil	Aasirvatham	
2020	Naadodigal 2	Mariyadum Perumal	
2020	Nungambakkam	Lawyer	
2020	Soorarai Pottru	Chinnaswamy	
2022	Naai Sekar	Sekar's father	
2022	Viruman	Doctor	
2022	Pistha	Kamal Haasan	
2022	DSP	Shanmugam	
2022	Sembi	Judge	
2023	Kodai		
2023	Kannai Nambathey		
2023	Sathiya Sothanai		
2023	Baba Black Sheep		
2023	The Road		
2024	Ippadiku Kadhal		
2024	Kalvan	Kumaresan	
2024	Dhil Raja		
2024	Aalan	Himself	Cameo appearance
2024	Thiru.Manickam	Himself	Cameo appearance
2025	Kombuseevi	Judge	
2026	Vaa Vaathiyaar	Court judge	
2026	Gilli Mappilai		

Key
†	Denotes films that have not yet been released

=== Television ===
List of G. Gnanasambandam television credits
Year	Title	Role	Channel
2016–2018	Saravanan Meenatchi	Marudupandi	STAR Vijay
2019	Tamil Selvi	Dr. Kamaraj	Sun TV
2019–2020	Cooku With Comali (season 1)	Himself/Contestant	Star Vijay
2020–2021	Thirumathi Hitler	Chakravarthy	Zee Tamil
2021–2022	Enga Veetu Meenakshi	Principal	Colors Tamil
2019–2020	Bommiyum Thirukkuralum	Himself	Chutti TV
2023–present	Singapennae	Azhagappan	Sun TV

== List of books ==
- Vaanga Sirikkalam
- Paraparappu – Siripu
- Pesum Kalai
- Ulagam Ungal Kaiyil
- Indraya Sinthanai
- Valviyal Nagaichuvai
- Kalloori Athisayangal
- Ilakkiya Saaral
- Santhithathum Sinthithathum
- Medai Payanangal
- Jeykapovathu Neethan
- Sirithukondae Jeypom
- Kelvi Pathil
- Kadal Thaviya Kadhanayagan
- Parthaen Padithaen Rasithaen
- Sholavandan Jenagai Mariamman Temple (Temple History)
- Gala Gala Kadaisi pakkam

== Awards ==
Tamil Nadu State Government Awards 2014 – Mahakavi Bharathiar Award

Tamil Nadu State Government Award 2005 – Kalaimamani Kalaimamani Award
