= AGP Schizophrenia =

2022 psychological thriller film

AGP
- Theatrical release poster
- Directed by: Ramesh Subramaniyan
- Written by: Ramesh Subramaniyan
- Produced by: Ramesh Subramaniyan
- Starring: Lakshmi Menon R. V. Bharathan Sai Jivitha Mothiswaran
- Cinematography: Santhosapandi
- Edited by: Chandrakumar
- Music by: Jaikrish
- Production company: KSR Studio
- Release date: 21 January 2022
- Running time: 107 Minutes
- Country: India
- Language: Tamil

AGP (Schizophrenia) is a 2022 Indian Tamil-language psychological thriller film directed by Ramesh Subramaniyan and starring Lakshmi Menon and R. V. Bharathan. It was released on 21 January 2022.

== Cast ==
- Lakshmi Menon as Pooja
- R. V. Bharathan as Gowtham
- Soniya as Priya
- Sai Jivitha as Anjali
- Mothiswaran as Mothis
- Murugan as Varun

== Production ==
Debutant director Ramesh Subramaniyan had earlier worked as an associate director on Naaigal Jaakirathai (2014), Miruthan (2016) and Kee (2019). Lakshmi Menon rejected thirteen scripts before accepting this film. The makers marketed it as "the first female schizophrenia Tamil film". The film was shot in Chennai, Tiruvannamalai, and Chengalpattu throughout 2020 and 2021, with production breaks taken during the COVID-19 lockdown. The first look of the film was released in October 2021, with a trailer released in early January 2022.

== Reception ==
The film was released on 21 January 2022 across Tamil Nadu. A critic from Maalai Malar gave the film a negative review, noting it was "low on thrills". A critic from Malai Murasu also gave the film a mixed review.
