= Thondan (2017 film) =

2017 Indian Tamil vigilante drama film

- Directed by: Samuthirakani
- Written by: Samuthirakani
- Produced by: R. Manikandan
- Starring: Samuthirakani; Vikranth; Sunaina; Arthana Binu; Gouri Nair; Namo Narayana
- Cinematography: N. K. Ekambaram; Richard M. Nathan
- Edited by: A. L. Ramesh
- Music by: Justin Prabhakaran
- Production company: Vasundara Devi Cine Films
- Distributed by: Vasundara Devi Cine Films
- Release date: 26 May 2017
- Country: India
- Language: Tamil

Thondan (transl. Votary) is a 2017 Indian Tamil-language vigilante action drama film written and directed by Samuthirakani. The film stars Samuthirakani himself, with Vikranth, Sunaina, Arthana Binu, Gouri Nair, and Namo Narayana amongst others in pivotal roles. The music is composed by Justin Prabhakaran with editing by A. L. Ramesh. The venture began production in December 2016 and had a theatrical release on 26 May 2017.

== Plot ==
Narayanan is the son of State Minister Pandiyanar in Vellore. Narayanan has been using his father's name and influence to make money through corruption, much to the latter's dismay. Although Pandiyanar has been an MLA and minister for only three years, Narayanan has amassed a huge fortune and an industrial empire by unsavoury means. One day, some goons try to kill a man in daylight, as instructed by Narayanan. The man is lying in a pool of blood, and a local person witnesses this and calls an ambulance. The ambulance driver is Maha Vishnu, a kindhearted man who takes pride in never letting anyone die in his ambulance on the way to the hospital. Vishnu admits the man to the hospital, and he is saved. Narayanan is angry with Vishnu for saving his enemy, to which the latter replies that saving people's lives is his duty.

Vishnu is married to Bagalamugi. He has a father and sister, Mahishasuramardini. The latter is stalked by Vicky, a drunkard and jobless youth who happens to be a friend of Vishnu. Vishnu convinces Vicky to reform and attend the medical technician course. Vicky completes it and saves people's lives, earning the love of Vishnu and his family. Mahi has a friend named Gowri, who is stalked by Narayanan's brother Chinna Pandi, and she beats him on a bus. Insulted by this, Chinna Pandi beats Gowri up with a wooden log. Enraged, Mahi and the students kill him. Vishnu arrives with his ambulance to admit Chinna Pandi to the hospital. To avoid traffic, he takes the outer bypass, infuriating Narayanan. Chinna Pandi succumbs to the injury. Narayanan blames Vishnu for this and beats him up, but the public saves him. Narayanan vows to kill Vishnu.

Vishnu gets mad after his father loses his hearing ability and his wife suffers a miscarriage. Deeply saddened by this, he confronts Narayanan, who pleads his innocence. Vishnu believes that, being a common man, he cannot do anything against a powerful man with political support. Narayanan has consistently bribed local police Inspector Uthaman and various government officials and has them under his control. Sub-Inspector Rahman helps Vishnu. Vishnu plans to destroy Narayanan and bring him to justice. He is covertly invited to join the ruling party by the District secretary, who, despite being an MLA, had not been made a minister because Pandiyanar's caste has more votes in their district. Vishnu declines and proceeds by himself. He gathers all the details of the properties owned by Narayanan and video footage of him insulting Uthaman and the government officials while bribing Narayanan's auditor, who helps Vishnu because he once saved his wife's life. Vishnu realizes that Narayanan used Pandiyanar's name to earn huge amounts of money and buy many properties through corruption. Vishnu sends the evidence to IT, Vigilance, and other departments. He also sends the video footage to Uthaman's wife and the government officials' wives, who lose respect of their families. Uthaman and the government officials decide to stop supporting Narayanan for his further actions.

The IT department raids Narayanan's house, confiscates all of his belongings, and arrests him. Pandiyanar is sacked from the state cabinet and woes in despair. Narayanan is goaded to escape from the hospital, through the info that the state government is planning his suicide to repair damage, and the police chases him. He temporarily evades them but meets with an accident in the town center. While he is struggling, Vishnu comes with his ambulance and saves him.

== Cast ==
- Samuthirakani as Maha Vishnu
- Vikranth as Vicky
- Sunaina as Bagalamugi
- Arthana Binu as Mahishasuramardini (Mahi)
- Gouri Nair as Gowri
- Namo Narayana as Narayanan
- Ganja Karuppu as Xavier
- Vela Ramamoorthy as Vishnu and Mahi's father
- Anil Murali as Inspector Uthaman
- Poraali Dileepan as Sub-Inspector Rahman
- G. Gnanasambandam as State Minister Pandiyanar, Narayanan's father
- Soundararaja as Chinna Pandi
- Badava Gopi as Unnmai TV Reporter Aryabhatham
- Naadodigal Gopal as Sikkal Shanmugasundaram, Bagalamugi's father
- Indrani as Pandiyanar's wife
- Nasath as Vaikuntham, Bagalamugi's younger brother
- Pichaikkaran Moorthy
- Nithya Ravindran
- Baboos
- V. Murugavel
- Soori as "Ilaikadai" Ramar (guest appearance)
- Thambi Ramaiah as Income Tax Officer (guest appearance)

== Production ==
In May 2016, Samuthirakani revealed that he was set to work with Jayam Ravi for the second time after Nimirndhu Nil on a project titled Thondan, using a script that he had initially written for Sasikumar. He stated that production would begin by the end of the year, with Allari Naresh also selected to play a role. However Jayam Ravi's busy schedule during 2016 and 2017 meant that the pair could not eventually work together.

The film re-materialised during December 2016, with Vikranth signed on to portray the role originally assigned to Naresh, while Samuthirakani himself would play the lead role. Vikranth revealed that he would star in the project alongside commitments to work in Suseenthiran's ventures Vennila Kabaddi Kuzhu 2 and Nenjil Thunivirundhal. Samuthirakani stated the film would be about "simple men, their lives, problems and pain" and "these are people who provide a service to the society; they might earn a less salaries, but they definitely get more satisfaction out of life". He added that the film would tackle several social issues in India including demonetisation, corruption in politics, the farmers' plight, jallikattu and the harassment of women. Production began during early December 2016, with Sunaina added to the cast after Samuthirakani was impressed with her performance in Neerparavai (2012).

== Soundtrack ==
Thondan

Soundtrack album by Justin Prabhakaran
- Released: 9 April 2017
- Recorded: 2016–17
- Length: 18:38
- Language: Tamil
- Label: U1 Records
- Producer: Justin Prabhakaran

Justin Prabhakaran chronology
Kaalakkoothu (2017)	Thondan (2017)	Oru Nalla Naal Paathu Solren (2018)

The film's music was composed by Justin Prabhakaran and featured five songs. The album was released on 9 April 2017 through Yuvan Shankar Raja's U1 Records label.

Track list
No.	Title	Lyrics	Singer(s)	Length
1.	"Thondan Thondan"	Yugabharathi	Diwakar	3:13
2.	"Chellakutti Joraa"	Vivek	Justin Prabhakaran, Prashanthini	3:25
3.	"Poi Varavaa"	Yugabharathi	Sean Roldan	4:31
4.	"Ettoorum Kekkum"	Yugabharathi	Pradeep Kumar	4:08
5.	"Vaasamulla Poovaa"	Yugabharathi	Vaikom Vijayalakshmi, Daya Bijibal	3:21
Total length:				18:38

== Release ==
The film had a theatrical release across Tamil Nadu on 26 May 2017, alongside Radha Mohan's Brindavanam, and earned mixed to negative reviews. The satellite rights of the film were sold to Zee Tamil. Baradwaj Rangan of Film Companion wrote "All of which would be okay...if there was a grain of good filmmaking. But the utterly generic bring-down-the-bad-guy story is preposterous, and scenes go on and on."

== Reception ==
Anupama Subramaniam of the Deccan Chronicle wrote Thondan is an "interesting film sans entertainment values" and "all is well and good, but things do become a bit self-righteous and annoying when a fictional film begins to give you lessons on ethics and morality". India Today's review stated that "Thondan is Samuthirakani's TED Talk in Tamil that runs for more than two hours", adding that it is "an uninteresting social commentary". On a positive note, film critic Santhosh Mathevan wrote, "Kani documents a lot of true events, and he also comes out with some real time and cinematic references in his screenplay." He also criticised, "Usually, the mercury level of preaching would always touch the peak of thermometer in every of Kani's movie. But, Thondan has let the mercury bulb burst, as the film seems to be a 138 minute-tight-pack of loads of moral values to teach." Sify.com stated the film was "filled with a plethora of messages in an over preachy tone". A critic from The New Indian Express wrote the film was "a basket of moral lectures", concluding "Thondan is what you feared would happen once Appa (2016) did as well as it did". Baradwaj Rangan rated the film 1 out of 5 and wrote, "As expected, actor and director Samuthirakani, delivers yet another sermon disguised as a movie". The film took a lukewarm opening at the Chennai box office and fared averagely commercially.
