= Marudhu =

2016 Indian film by M. Muthaiah

- Theatrical release poster
- Directed by: M. Muthaiah
- Written by: M. Muthaiah
- Produced by: G. N. Anbu Chezhiyan
- Starring: Vishal; Soori; Sri Divya
- Cinematography: Velraj; Srinivas Devamsam
- Edited by: Praveen K. L.
- Music by: D. Imman
- Production company: Gopuram Films
- Release date: 20 May 2016
- Country: India
- Language: Tamil

Marudhu is a 2016 Indian Tamil-language action drama film written and directed by M. Muthaiah and produced by G. N. Anbu Chezhiyan. The film stars Vishal as the titular character, while Soori, Sri Divya, Kulappulli Leela, R. K. Suresh, and Radha Ravi play supporting roles. The music was composed by D. Imman. The film was released worldwide on 20 May 2016.

== Plot ==
Maruthu is a labourer from Thalaivankottai working in the Rajapalayam vegetable market who does not tolerate injustice. He leads a happy life with his grandmother, Appathaa, and his close friend, Kokkarako. While working at the market, Maruthu sees some goons chasing his girlfriend Bhagyam and her father. He beats up the goons and learns from Bhagyam's father that her mother, Mariyamma, was a brave woman who stood up to the atrocities committed by the municipal chairman, Rolex Pandiyan, against the local people. When Mariyamma decided to run against Pandiyan in the upcoming municipal election, Pandiyan and his men brutally hacked her to death. Bhagyam and her father are unable to prove in court that Pandiyan committed the murder. Appathaa, who witnessed Mariyamma's brutal murder, gets upset that she did not stop it and has Maruthu married to Bhagyam to repent her earlier actions. Maruthu also promises to avenge Mariyamma's death. A cat-and-mouse game ensues with Pandiyan using all means to stop Bhagyam and Appathaa from testifying against him, but to no avail. At the court, Appathaa testifies against Pandiyan, who is issued an arrest warrant. In retaliation, Pandiyan kidnaps Appathaa and brutally tortures her to death. Enraged, Maruthu single-handedly fights Pandiyan and his gang, kills them all, and performs Appathaa's funeral rites.

== Cast ==
- Vishal as Maruthu
- Soori as Kokkarako
- Sri Divya as Bhagyam
- Kulappulli Leela as Maariamma (Appatha)
- R. K. Suresh as Rolex Pandi
- Radha Ravi as Bailwan
- Aadhira Pandilakshmi as Silambakallu Mariyamma
- G. Marimuthu as Bhagyam's father
- G. Gnanasambandam as Tahsildar
- Namo Narayana as Pambarathaan
- Aruldoss as Rolex Pandiyan's henchmen
- Bharathi Kannan
- Saravana Sakthi

== Production ==
Radharavi was added to the cast of the film, causing widespread surprise, after losing to Vishal in a much-publicized poll during the 2015 Nadigar Sangam elections. The film began shooting in Rajapalayam in late November 2015, and was mostly complete by February 2016.

== Soundtrack ==
Marudhu (Original Motion Picture Soundtrack)

Soundtrack album by D. Imman
- Released: 29 April 2016
- Genre: Feature film soundtrack
- Length: 22:01
- Language: Tamil
- Label: Sony Music India
- Producer: D. Imman

D. Imman chronology
Vetrivel (2016)	Marudhu (Original Motion Picture Soundtrack) (2016)	Kotigobba 2 (2016)

The soundtrack was composed by D. Imman.

Track listing
No.	Title	Lyrics	Singer(s)	Length
1.	"Sooravalida"	Yugabharathi	Jinesh Prabhu	5:05
2.	"Othasada Rosa"	Yugabharathi	Saisharan, Pooja Vaidyanath	4:40
3.	"Karuvakaatu Karuvaaya"	Vairamuthu	Vandana Srinivasan, Jithin Raj, Jayamoorthy	4:50
4.	"Akka Petha Jakkavandi"	Yugabharathi	Anirudh Ravichander, Niranjana Ramanan	4:03
5.	"Marudhu Marudhu"	–	–	3:23
Total length:				22:01

== Reception ==
M Suganth of The Times of India wrote, "In Maruthu, Muthaiah combines a couple of angles from his previous films and presents them as a whole, new film [...] What keeps us engaged is the way in which the director withholds information in the first half and reveals them gradually in the second". S Saraswathi of Rediff.com wrote, "With a rather ordinary script and unremarkable execution, coupled with the endless chasing scenes, the excessive violence and melodrama, director Muthaiya's Marudhu only gives you a headache". Sify wrote, "Marudhu is technically slick with excellent cinematography by Velraj with a brown tone (climax fight reminds you of Sandakozhi). Imman pulsating background score and Praveen KL's razor sharp editing too elevate the film to a different level".
