= Poraali =

- Theatrical release poster
- Directed by: P. Samuthirakani
- Written by: P. Samuthirakani
- Produced by: M. Sasikumar
- Starring: M. Sasikumar; Naresh; Swathi Reddy; Nivetha Thomas; Vasundhara Kashyap
- Cinematography: S. R. Kathir
- Edited by: A. L. Ramesh
- Music by: Sundar C. Babu
- Production company: Company Productions
- Release date: 1 December 2011
- Running time: 145 minutes
- Country: India
- Language: Tamil

Poraali (transl. Militant) is a 2011 Indian Tamil-language action thriller film directed by P. Samuthirakani and produced by M. Sasikumar. The film stars Sasikumar, Allari Naresh, Swathi Reddy, Nivetha Thomas, Vasundhara Kashyap, Soori and Ganja Karuppu.

Poraali was released on 1 December 2011, and became a commercial success. The film was dubbed in Telugu as Sangharshana (2011) and remade in Kannada by the same director as Yaare Koogadali (2012).

== Plot ==
Ilangkumaran "Kumaran" and Nallavan escape from a mental asylum on a rainy night and settle down in Chennai at Pulikutti's house under funny circumstances. Kumaran and Nallavan find a job at Indian Oil petrol bunk and their good nature receive good friends, where they soon organise a service. Kumaran meets his neighbour Bharathi, who dislikes him first, but falls for his kind-hearted nature. Nallavan also meets Tamizhselvi at the petrol bunk and falls in love with her. Things change when Pulikutti advertises Kumaran and Nallavan's service in a magazine with their photos.

It is revealed that Kumaran is actually being hunted by his relatives. Kumaran had faced a tough time in his childhood because his relatives were eyeing on his property. Kumaran's relatives confined his mother to a room after claiming that she is mentally ill. While Kumaran's father marries another woman, Kumaran's grandfather gets poisoned by the relatives and decides to sell a piece of land, but they learn that Kumaran's signature is a mandatory for the deal. The relatives soon brands Kumaran as mentally ill and gets him admitted to a mental asylum by bribing the asylum doctors. However, Kumaran manages to escape after receiving encouragement from a kind-hearted doctor to start a new life and escape from the asylum with Nallavan, who was also admitted there.

Kumaran and Nallavan manage to escape from their relatives, where they reveal their past to Bharathi and Tamizhselvi. Kumaran's friend Pichai arrives in Chennai and reveals to Kumaran that they can donate the land to the government. Kumaran donates the land, which leaves his relatives enraged. Kumaran and Nallavan leave the city with Bharathi and Tamizhselvi, but the relatives chase after them. With Bharathi's encouragement to fight back, Kumaran and Nallavan fight the relatives and brutally thrash them. After thrashing them, Kumaran, Nallavan, Bharathi and Tamizhselvi return to their home and resume their peaceful life. Meanwhile, Pulikutty is released from the police station after being arrested for dressing up as a bear and frightening people. He is caught by the relatives of Nallavan who have come looking for him after seeing their ad, hinting at a sequel.

== Cast ==
- M. Sasikumar as Ilangkumaran
- Naresh as Nallavan / Bulusupalli Seetharama Anjaneyala Rajashekara Srinivasala Lakshmi Narayana Siva Venkata Kondal Rao
- Swathi as Bharathi
- Nivetha Thomas as Thamizhselvi
- Vasundhara Kashyap as Maari
- Soori as Pichai
- Ganja Karuppu as Pulikutti
- Sandra Amy as Shanthi
- Jayaprakash as Doctor
- G. Gnanasambandan as House Owner
- Badava Gopi as Ground Floor Tenant
- Kalpana Shree as Ilangkumaran's stepmother
- Namo Narayana
- V. Gnanavel as Petrol Bunk Owner
- Sunil Sukhada as Malayali
- Dileepan as Ground Floor Tenant's neighbour
- Naadodigal Gopal as Villager
- Allen Mathews as Ilangkumaran's stepbrother

== Production ==
In November 2011, it was announced that M. Sasikumar and P. Samuthirakani, who directed and starred in Easan (2010) respectively, would reunite for a new project titled Poraali, with their duties now swapped. During the production of Naadodigal (2009), its director Samuthirakani narrated the script of Poraali to Sasikumar, who promised to produce it after completing Easan. Swathi Reddy, who starred in Sasikumar's Subramaniapuram (2008) as a "coy, timid girl" who spoke less, accepted to star in Poraali as she was impressed with this character being more verbose, independent and vastly different from the Subramaniapuram role.

== Soundtrack ==
The soundtrack was composed by Sundar C. Babu.

Track listing
No.	Title	Lyrics	Singer(s)	Length
1.	"Vithiya Potri"	Yugabharathi	M. Sasikumar, P. Samuthirakani	2.33
2.	"Yaar Ivan" (Male)	Na. Muthukumar	Shankar Mahadevan	5.06
3.	"Vedi Podu"	Kabilan	Velmurugan, Thanjai Selvi	3.36
4.	"Yaar Ivan" (Female)	Na. Muthukumar	Chinmayi Sripada	4.39
5.	"Engiruthu"	Na. Muthukumar	Chinmayi Sripada	1.34
6.	"Vegamaai Adhivegamaai" (Instrumental)	–	–	2.38
Total length:				20.36

Telugu track listing
No.	Title	Lyrics	Singer(s)	Length
1.	"Gham Gham Ganapathy"	Vennelakanti	Khushi Murali	2:11
2.	"Thodagotti Levaraa"	Chandrabose	Hanuman, M. M. Srilekha	3:35
3.	"Yevvaro Yevarithado" (Male)	Chandrabose	Shankar Mahadevan	5:03
4.	"Yevvaro Yevarithado" (Female)	Chandrabose	Binni Krishnakumar	4:38
5.	"Yevarithado"	Chandrabose	Binni Krishnakumar	1:32
6.	"Sangharshana Theme" (Instrumental)	–	–	2:28
Total length:				19:27

== Critical reception ==
Sify gave 4/5 stars and wrote, "Poraali has its heart in the right place, and Sasikumar's charismatic, alluring appeal lifts this film considerably". The Times of India gave 3.5/5 stars and wrote, "After following up with the equally likable Pasanga, Sasikumar and his team came up with Naadodigal and Easan that did not quite match up to their earlier works. Poraali also falls in the same league. A tough struggle is called for if they want to live up to the promise they displayed in their first two films". Pavithra Srinivasan of Rediff.com gave 3/5 stars and wrote, "The director manages to infuse enough humour and heart into Poraali to make it work and is a worth a watch".

The New Indian Express wrote, "Shifting his ambience, bringing in multi characters and issues, the script may seem a tad loosely etched at times, unlike his earlier [Naadodigal]. But Samudrakani manages to get his grip back on the narration, knotting it all up into a fairly engaging whole". Malathi Rangarajan of The Hindu wrote, "Samuthirakani's Naadodigal was an engaging running game. Poraali is a different kind of chase, but again absorbing enough". IANS wrote, "The film is for those who would like to get entertained without bothering about finer elements and reasoning".

== Accolades ==
At the 7th Variety Film Awards, Samuthirakani won the award for Best Sensational Director.
