= Lakshmi Menon (actress) =

Indian actress

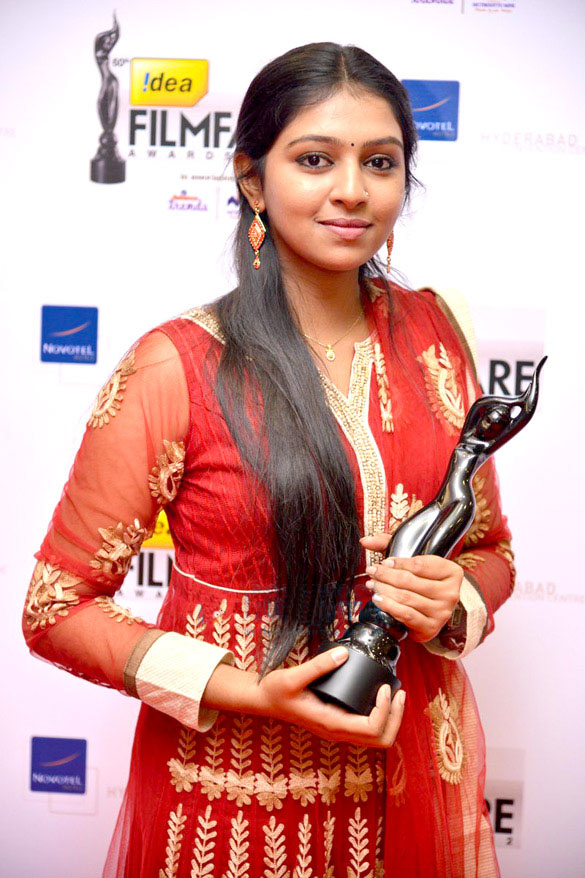
- Menon at the 60th South Filmfare Awards 2013
- Born: Lakshmi Menon; 19 May 1996 (age 30); Kochi, Kerala, India
- Education: Reva University, Bangalore
- Occupations: Actress; Choreographer; Playback singer
- Years active: 2011–2016; 2021–present

Lakshmi Menon (born 19 May 1996) is an Indian actress who mainly appears in Tamil films. After making her acting debut in a supporting role in the Malayalam film Raghuvinte Swantham Raziya (2011). She made her first main female lead with her Tamil debut film Sundara Pandian in 2012. She is a recipient of a Filmfare Award South, one Tamil Nadu State Film Award and two SIIMA Awards.

== Early life and education ==
Lakshmi Menon was born on 19 May 1996 at Kochi to Malayali parents Ramakrishnan, a Dubai-based artist, and Usha Menon, a dance teacher. She did her schooling at Bhavan's Munshi Vidyashram school in Thrippunithura. She then enrolled at the Sacred Heart College, Kochi, for her graduation in English literature. Later, she completed a diploma in Bharatanatyam from REVA University in 2019.

== Career ==
=== 2011-2016 ===
In 2011, Malayalam director Vinayan, who saw her during Bharatanatyam telecast, cast her in his film Raghuvinte Swantham Raziya. She was in her eight grade when she acted in the film. Soon after, she played the lead along with Vineeth in another Malayalam film titled Ideal Couple, directed by Ali Akbar.

Watching her performance, director Prabhakaran offered her the lead role in Sundarapandian (2012) opposite M. Sasikumar, which released before Kumki and marked her Tamil debut. Director Prabu Solomon cast her in Kumki (2012) opposite actor Vikram Prabhu. After acting with Sasikumar again in Kutti Puli, she was seen as a demure school teacher Malar in Suseenthiran's action-drama film Pandianadu (2013), which co-starred Vishal.

In Naan Sigappu Manithan (2014) saw her pairing up with Vishal again. She acted in two Tamil films, Manja Pye with Vimal and Jigarthanda with Siddharth in 2014. She completed Komban (2015) had hit the screens and got her a good name for her role and as well as her movie Vedalam (2015) in which she portrayed the role of sister for Ajith Kumar. In 2016, she did two movie named Miruthan with Jayam Ravi' which was the first Tamil zombie movie and Rekka with Vijay Sethupathi.

=== 2021-present ===
Her next project was Pulikkuthi Pandi (2021) which is Lakshmi Menon's third film under M. Muthaiah's direction, and the film also marked the actress comeback on big screens after four years. Then, Lakshmi Menon plays a schizophrenic person in female-centric film AGP Schizophrenia (2022). She starred in Chandramukhi 2 (2023) direct by P. Vasu. Lakshmi Menon gets a meaty role in the film and she has delivered a decent performance. However, Chandramukhi 2 fails to bring anything fresh to the film, and ends up delivering a colour-remastered copy of its predecessor. In the horror thriller film Sabdham (2025), Lakshmi Menon in a refreshingly unique professor role, delivers a compelling performance.

== Controversies ==
In August 2025, she, along with three others, was booked for the abduction and assault of an IT professional in Kerala.

== Filmography ==
Key
†	Denotes films that have not yet been released

Year	Title	Role(s)	Language(s)	Notes	Ref.
2011	Raghuvinte Swantham Rasiya	Priya	Malayalam	Malayalam Debut	
2012	Ideal Couple	Shanthi	Malayalam		
2012	Sundarapandian	Archana	Tamil	Tamil Debut	
2012	Kumki	Alli	Tamil		
2013	Kutti Puli	Bharathi	Tamil		
2013	Pandiya Naadu	Malarvizhi Chidambaram	Tamil		
2014	Naan Sigappu Manithan	Meera	Tamil		
2014	Manjapai	Karthika	Tamil		
2014	Jigarthanda	Kayalvizhi	Tamil		
2014	Avatharam	Mani Meghala (Mani Kutty)	Malayalam		
2015	Komban	Pazhani	Tamil		
2015	Vedalam	Thamizharasi (Thamizh)	Tamil		
2015	Vasuvum Saravananum Onna Padichavanga	Lakshmi	Tamil	Voice Over Only	
2016	Miruthan	Dr. Renuka	Tamil		
2016	Rekka	Bharathi	Tamil		
2021	Pulikkuthi Pandi	Pechi	Tamil	Direct Television Premiere	
2022	AGP Schizophrenia	Pooja	Tamil		
2023	Chandramukhi 2	Divya	Tamil		
2025	Sabdham	Avanthika	Tamil		
TBA	Malai †	TBA	Tamil	Filming	

=== Discography ===
Year	Film	Song	Composer	Lyricist	Co Singer
2014	Oru Oorla Rendu Raja	"Kukkuru Kukkuru"	D. Imman	Eknaath	Sathyan
2015	Saagasam	"Desi Girl Desi Girl"	S. Thaman	Madhan Karky	Silambarasan
2015	Kuzhambi	"Oh Coffee Penne"	Rama Subramanian R.	Ko Sesha	

== Awards and nominations ==
Work	Award	Category	Result	Ref
Sundarapandian	7th Vijay Awards	Best Debut Actress	Nominated	
Sundarapandian	Ananda Vikatan Cinema Awards	Best Debut Actress	Won	
Sundarapandian	The Chennai Times Film Award	Promising Female Newcomer	Won	
Sundarapandian	60th Filmfare Awards South	Best Female Debut	Won	
Sundarapandian	2nd SIIMA Awards	Best Female Debut – Tamil	Won	
Sundarapandian	Tamil Nadu State Film Awards	Best Actress	Won	
Kumki	Tamil Nadu State Film Awards	Best Actress	Won	
Kumki	Norway Tamil Film Festival Awards	Best Actress	Won	
Kumki	60th Filmfare Awards South	Best Actress – Tamil	Nominated	
Various films	3rd SIIMA Awards	Rising Star of South Indian Cinema (female)	Won	
Naan Sigappu Manithan	9th Vijay Awards	Best Actress	Nominated	
Jigarthanda	4th SIIMA Awards	Best Actress	Nominated	
Vedalam	5th SIIMA Awards	Best Actress in a Supporting Role	Nominated	
