= Rekka (film) =

2016 Indian Tamil-language film by Rathina Siva

- Theatrical release poster
- Directed by: Rathina Shiva
- Written by: Rathina Shiva
- Produced by: B. Ganesh
- Starring: Vijay Sethupathi; Lakshmi Menon
- Cinematography: Dinesh B. Krishnan
- Edited by: Praveen K. L.
- Music by: D. Imman
- Production company: Common Man
- Distributed by: Sivabalan Pictures
- Release date: 7 October 2016
- Running time: 142 minutes
- Country: India
- Language: Tamil

Rekka (transl. Wing) is a 2016 Indian Tamil-language masala film written and directed by Rathina Shiva. The film features Vijay Sethupathi, Lakshmi Menon, Kabir Duhan Singh, and Harish Uthaman in the lead roles, while Sathish, K. S. Ravikumar and Sriranjani play supporting roles. The film is produced by B. Ganesh, who co-produced Orange Mittai. Featuring music composed by D. Imman and cinematography by Dinesh B. Krishnan. The film which commenced production in January 2015 was released on 7 October 2016 along with other Tamil movies, Remo and Devi. Upon release, the film received mixed reviews from critics.

== Plot ==
Cheliyan and David are two rival dons. Cheliyan kills David's brother, so David swears to avenge his brother's death and waits for the right opportunity. Shiva is a youth from Kumbakonam who unites lovers, and his family supports him. This brings him several troubles, one of which is from David when Shiva stops David's marriage to a girl who refused to marry him. David wants to know who stopped his marriage and leaves the place without a word after seeing him. This worries Shiva's father, Ratnam, as he fears that David might harm his son. Shiva hallucinates a woman whom he calls Mala, who asks him 'Why did you do this?' and he replies that he will correct everything. He is having trouble for a reason, and his family consoles him. Shiva's sister is getting married, and Shiva ensures that no trouble comes in the marriage. However, the day before the marriage, Shiva faces a critical situation with David, who threatens to stop his sister's marriage just as Shiva stopped his. Shiva begs David, saying he is ready to do anything for him in return for allowing his sister's marriage to happen without any problems. David demands that he abduct a woman from Madurai, who is the daughter of Minister Manivasagam, an influential politician in Madurai. Shiva agrees and leaves for Madurai, missing his sister's wedding.

At Madurai, he finds Bharathi, Cheliyan's fiancée, whom David wants him to abduct. Shiva intends to take a selfie with her and make David believe he abducted her. Things take a turn when Bharathi announces to everyone, including her family, that she is going to elope with Shiva, getting everyone to think he is her boyfriend. Manivasagam's men try to stop them, but they fly away to Coimbatore, the headquarters of Cheliyan. Shiva ensures that his sister's marriage happens with no problems and receives updates from his friend Keerai. In Coimbatore, Bharathi waits for Shiva to propose to her, but Shiva is confused about why she eloped with him. David reaches Coimbatore and challenges Cheliyan that he abducted Bharathi. Cheliyan rushes to the mall he owns, where Shiva and Bharathi are having coffee. Bharathi encourages him to propose to her, but in turn, Shiva tells her about his childhood love.

During Shiva's 6th standard, he was in love with a girl named Mala, his tuition teacher, who was much older than him. All the men in the town fall in love with her, including a newly graduated doctor, Selvam. Mala reciprocates his love as well, though they do not declare their love to each other. Shiva misunderstands his love for Mala, but Mala tells him that he loves him as her brother. Mala's father cheats people with fraudulent chit funds and demands that Mala vacate the town, failing which he threatens her that he will commit suicide. Mala writes a letter to Selvam and asks Shiva to deliver it to him. However, on the way, Shiva's friends tempt him to watch a movie. The next morning, Selvam is shocked to find that Mala has left town without leaving any message. People whom Mala's father deceived demand money from Selvam, and they thrash Selvam's father, leading to his death. Selvam turns insane out of shock. Shiva understands that the letter which he failed to deliver to Selvam is the reason behind his insanity. He is not able to recover from guilt, and that is why he hallucinates Mala. To overcome his guilt, he starts helping lovers unite. Bharathi also reveals why she eloped with Shiva.

Bharathi met Shiva at an elderly couple's 80th birthday marriage event, which Shiva organized. She was attracted by the fact that his family supports him of his actions and everyone speaks well of him. She was waiting for the right time to meet him, but destiny brought him to her. She declares her love for Shiva, but he is shocked. David calls Shiva, tells him to leave her, and vacates the place. When Shiva resists, he threatens to kill Ratnam. Out of guilt once again, he leaves the place. Things take a turn when Mala meets him in a situation where several goons chase her. She requests that he take her to the police station. Shiva reveals himself and saves Mala from the goons. David forcibly takes Bharathi with him and takes her to Cheliyan. David and Cheliyan come face-to-face to kill each other. Shiva interrupts and takes Bharathi with him. Cheliyan tries to stop them, but David interrupts Cheliyan to avenge. After a series of fights, Shiva takes Bharathi and Mala to Kumbakonam. Back in Coimbatore, Cheliyan and David try to get rid of each other. In Kumbakonam, Shiva unites Mala with Selvam. He tears off the letter that he failed to deliver to Selvam years ago without reading what was written in it.

Now, Shiva has to face Manivasagam and his men to win the love between him and Bharathi.

== Cast ==
- Vijay Sethupathi as Shiva
  - Master Raghavan as Young Shiva
- Lakshmi Menon as Bharathi
- Sathish as Keerai
- Kishore as Selvam
- Kabir Duhan Singh as Chezhiyan
- Harish Uthaman as David
- Sija Rose as Mala
  - Master Hariharan as Young Keerai
- K. S. Ravikumar as Ratnam, Shiva's father
- Sriranjani as Shiva's mother
- Meera Krishnan as Bharathi's mother
- Shalu Shamu as Bharathi's friend
- K. S. G. Venkatesh as Mala's father
- Babu G as Manivasagam, Bharathi's father
- Soundararaja
- Supergood Subramani as David's henchman
- TSR Srinivasan

== Production ==
The film began production in January 2016, with actress Lakshmi Menon announced as a lead. Harish Uthaman is said to be playing an important role. Vijay Sethupathi portrays the role of an advocate, due to some circumstances he is forced to kidnap a girl. Despite Vijay Sethupathi who suffered leg injury during the K. V. Anand-directional Kavan (2017), the team shot a romantic song in Bangkok.

== Music ==
Rekka

Soundtrack album by D. Imman
- Released: 25 September 2016
- Recorded: 2016
- Genre: Feature film soundtrack
- Length: 28:17
- Language: Tamil
- Label: Sony Music India
- Producer: D. Imman

D. Imman chronology
Thodari (2016)	Rekka (2016)	Meen Kuzhambum Mann Paanaiyum (2016)

Singles from Rekka
- 1. "Virru Virru" Released: 20 September 2016

All songs composed by D. Imman.

All lyrics are written by Yugabharathi.

Track-List
No.	Title	Singer(s)	Length
1.	"Kanna Kaattu Podhum"	Shreya Ghoshal	4:29
2.	"Virru Virru"	D. Imman, Jithin Raj	4:21
3.	"Kannamma Kannamma"	Nandini Srikar	4:02
4.	"Pollapayya"	Haricharan, Shweta Mohan	4:18
5.	"Furious Wings – Theme"	D. Imman, Vijay Sethupathi, Harish Uthaman	2:36
6.	"Kanna Kaattu Podhum" (Karaoke)		4:29
7.	"Kannamma Kannamma" (Karaoke)		4:02
Total length:			28:17

== Release ==
The film was released on 7 October 2016, clashing alongside Sivakarthikeyan's Remo and Prabhu Deva's Devi (L) The Tamil Nadu theatrical rights of Rekka were sold to a new production house named, Sivabalan Pictures for a huge price becoming a record for Vijay Sethupathi.

== Critical reception ==
Gautaman Bhaskaran of Hindustan Times rated the film 2.5/5 and wrote, "Rekka offers little as engaging content. The only saving grace is Vijay Sethupathi in a film that tends to slips into fantasy." Anupama Subramanian of Deccan Chronicle wrote, "The film heavily relies on Vijay Sethupathi’s on-screen charisma and a natural performer that he is, indeed shoulders the responsibility to a great extent." Sujatha Narayanan of The News Minute wrote, "The flight is fast in a few places, furious and fun in some and attains a “cruise mode” but the pilot, writer-director Rathinashiva ensures that you don't get to jump off mid-flight."

M. Suganth of The Times of India gave it 2/5 stars and wrote, "During its first half an hour or so, until Siva agrees to kidnap Bharathi to save his sister’s wedding, Rekka promises to be an edge-of-the-seat action entertainer with moves and countermoves, but by the time it ends, we only see a shambolic mess." Srivatsan of India Today gave it 1/5 stars and wrote, "Rathina Shiva's script is an audacious attempt. It's an audacious attempt at delivering a subject that only caters to some Telugu audience who are familiar with subjects like Yevadu, Rachcha and Race Gurram. [...] However, at least a wafer-thin story would have been appreciable, Rathina Shiva."

== See also ==
- Seeru (2019)
