= Vetrivel =

2016 Tamil drama film by Vasantha Mani

- Poster
- Directed by: Vasantha Mani
- Written by: Vasantha Mani
- Produced by: R. Ravindran
- Starring: Sasikumar; Prabhu; Miya; Nikhila Vimal
- Cinematography: S. R. Kathir
- Edited by: A. L. Ramesh
- Music by: D. Imman
- Production company: Trident Arts
- Distributed by: Lyca Productions
- Release date: 22 April 2016
- Country: India
- Language: Tamil

Vetrivel is a 2016 Tamil-language drama film written and directed by Vasantha Mani. The film stars Sasikumar, Prabhu, Miya and Nikhila Vimal (in her Tamil debut), while Viji Chandrasekhar, Ananth Nag and Varsha Bollamma portray supporting roles. The film, featuring music by D. Imman and cinematography by S. R. Kathir, released on 22 April 2016. The film received mostly positive reviews from critics.

== Plot ==
In 1987, PM Rajiv Gandhi announces the recreation of local self-administration bodies in India and the plans for elections. "Maniyakkarar" Rajamanickam (Prabhu) is a rich landlord in a village in Tanjore. His pregnant stepsister Kayavarnam (Viji Chandrasekhar) approaches him with a request that he should not contest the upcoming election for village chief, as her husband wants to contest. Rajamanickam relents without thoughts, and Kayavarnam goes happy. Meanwhile, leaders of eight villages gather with Rajamanickam and convince him to contest, as the village chief post will be contested by many people with wrong intentions if Rajamanickam does not contest. Rajamanickam agrees with the villagers and asks his brother-in-law to withdraw. His brother-in-law vehemently refuses, and the election heavily contested. Rajamanickam wins with a high vote difference, and his brother-in-law hangs himself. Kayavaram portrays the suicide as heart attack and promises revenge on Rajamanickam, effectively severing their relationship.

In 2010, Vetrivel (Sasikumar) is an organic fertilizer vendor who lives in a nearby village with his father Navaneetham (Ilavarasu), mother Saradha (Renuka) and brother Saravanan (Ananth Nag). Saravanan falls in love with his classmate Subha (Varsha Bollamma), Rajamanickam's only daughter. Meanwhile, Vetrivel develops a liking for an agriculture researcher Janani (Miya).

Vetrivel urges his father to approach Rajamanickam with a marriage proposal between Saravanan and Subha, for which Rajamanickam opposes, citing caste differences. Vetrivel and Saravanan plan to kidnap Subha during a temple festival but the plan fails as they accidentally kidnap another girl Latha (Nikhila Vimal) by mistake. Latha is engaged to Kayavarnam's son Arul (Rajesh Gopalan), and her wedding is supposed to take place in a week. Vetrivel realizes his mistake and rushes back to the village to drop off Latha, but her father commits suicide before her arrival, thinking that she eloped with someone. She understands that it was Kayavarnam who behaved very rude towards Latha’s father, which made him end his life.

Vetrivel marries Latha as she is helpless now. His parents accept Latha, understanding her situation. Janani, although disappointed, understands Vetrivel’s situation and accepts his decision. Meanwhile, Rajamanickam plans to get his daughter Subha married to his relative, but Vetrivel interferes and cancels the wedding talks. Finally, Rajamanickam decides to get Subha married to Arul with the hope of ending his long dispute with Kayavarnam. The wedding is arranged, and Rajamanickam drops off Subha in Kayavarnam’s house fearing Vetrival’s intervention again. But Rajamanickam finds out that Kayavarnam has plans to ditch Subha after wedding as a means of revenge on Rajamanickam.

Rajamanickam understands his mistake, meets Vetrivel's parents, and agrees for Subha's wedding with Saravanan. On his way back, Rajamanickam is kidnapped by Kayavarnam. Meanwhile, Arul informs Subha that he does not want to marry her without her consent. Arul asks Subha to inform Saravanan about her whereabouts so that Saravanan can come and rescue her. Subha informs Saravanan, and he arrives at the place but gets shocked to see Arul’s henchmen there. It is revealed that it was a plan by Kayavarnam and Arul to kill Saravanan. Vetrivel arrives there, where he beats everyone and saves Saravanan and Rajamanickam. Finally, Subha is married to Saravanan.

== Cast ==
- Sasikumar as Vetrivel
- Prabhu as Rajamanickam, Subha's father & Kayavarnam's elder-brother
- Miya as Janani, Vetrivel's ex-lover
- Nikhila Vimal as Latha, Vetrivel's wife
- Viji Chandrasekhar as Kayavarnam
- Ananth Nag as Saravanan, Vetrivel's brother
- Varsha Bollamma as Subha, Saravanan's lover
- Thambi Ramaiah as Otthaasai
- Ilavarasu as Navaneetham, Vetrivel's and Saravanan's father
- Renuka as Sharadha, Vetrivel’s and Saravanan's mother
- Praveena as Devana, Rajamanickam's wife and Subha's mother
- Rajesh Gopalan as Arul
- Samuthirakani in a cameo appearance
- Vijay Vasanth as Chandran (Cameo appearance)
- Bharani as Paandi (Cameo appearance)

== Production ==
Newcomer director Vasantha Mani revealed that he was working on the script of a film featuring Jai, Sasikumar and Samuthirakani during December 2014. By May 2015, he revealed that Jai did not sign the project and they were looking for a new actor to portray the role written for him instead. In early September 2015, after finishing work on Bala's Tharai Thappattai (2016), Sasikumar confirmed he would work on the project titled Vetrivel and an official launch was held. The film began production during September 2015 at Tanjore and completed a monthlong schedule, which ended early as a result of the 2015 Nadigar Sangam elections. Miya revealed that she was working on the film during December 2015, and noted that she would portray the character of Malayali girl in the film.

== Release ==
The film opened to positive reviews in April 2016, with Sify.com stating it is "a decent commercial entertainer with a neat message from Sasikumar, which is watchable for the authentic performance of the actors". Likewise, Behindwoods.com noted that "Though the movie does well to package a drama with a well plotted screenplay, neatly polished with newness, probably the main enemy for Vetrivel is that the average theatergoer these days wants his day out at theatre to be a bash". Baradwaj Rangan from The Hindu noted it has "been a while since a purely formulaic film was made with respect for the art as well as the audience", praising the production.

== Soundtrack ==
The soundtrack was composed by D. Imman.

Vetrivel

Soundtrack album by D. Imman
- Released: 2016
- Genre: Feature film soundtrack
- Language: Tamil

D. Imman chronology
Pokkiri Raja (2016)	Vetrivel (2016)	Marudhu (2016)

No.	Song	Singers	Lyrics
1	"Adiye Unna"	Sathya Prakash, Vandana Srinivasan	Yugabharathi
2	"Aattam Pottu"	Saisharan	Mohan Rajan
3	"Athuva"	Aalap Raju	Mohan Rajan
4	"Naatu Saalaiyile"	Anitha Venkat, Jayamoorthi, Kovilpatti Amali, V.M. Mahalingam	Yugabharathi
5	"Onnapola"	Shreya Ghoshal	Yugabharathi
