= Kutti Puli =

2013 Indian film by M. Muthaiah

- Theatrical release poster
- Directed by: M. Muthaiah
- Screenplay by: M. Muthaiah
- Story by: M. Muthaiah
- Produced by: S. Muruganandam & N. Puranna
- Starring: Sasikumar; Lakshmi Menon; Saranya Ponvannan; Bala Saravanan
- Cinematography: Mahesh Muthuswami
- Edited by: Gopi Krishna
- Music by: Ghibran
- Production company: Village Theaters
- Distributed by: Sun Pictures; Red Giant Movies
- Release date: 30 May 2013
- Country: India
- Language: Tamil

Kutti Puli (transl. Tiger Cub) is a 2013 Indian Tamil-language action drama film directed by M. Muthaiah in his directoral debut starring Sasikumar and Lakshmi Menon while Saranya Ponvannan and Bala Saravanan play supporting roles. The film opened to mixed reviews but performed well at the box office. The movie was remade in Kannada in 2019 as Sinnga starring Chiranjeevi Sarja.

== Plot ==
Kutti Puli is a youngster, who respects his mother Deivaani and is a part-time vigilante, who punishes crooked people, along with his friend Pappu. He meets Bharathi at a local store due to a misunderstanding. Time passes by, Bharathi understands Kutti Puli's kind nature and develops a mutual respect for Kutti Puli. MMS Moorthy is a hitman, who is hired by an MP to finish an assignment, but his attempts are unknowingly thwarted by Kutti Puli. After an attack involving Moorthy's brother, Kutti Puli is stabbed and is taken to the hospital where Bharathi and Deivanai arrange the money for his treatment. Kutti Puli recovers and Deivanai decide to seek forgiveness from those, who were thrashed by Kutti Puli. Meanwhile, Bharathi's father learns of Bharathi and Kutti Puli's relationship and seeks Moorthy's help in dealing with Kutti Puli.

Moorthy warns Kutti Puli, but Kutti Puli thrashes Moorthy and humiliates him in front of everyone, which determines Moorthy to avenge the humiliation by killing Kutti Puli. Kutti Puli learns of Deivanai's sacrifices for his well-being, due to which Kutti Puli decide to lead a life free from violence and accepts Bharathi's love. Moorthy sends his men to attack Kutti Puli, but Kutti Puli escapes. Deivanai learns about the attack from Pappu and leaves for Moorthy's house to seek forgiveness. Kutti Puli learns that Deivaanai is in Moorthy's house from Pappu and leaves to save her. After a battle with goons, which ends with the death of Moorthy's brother. Kutti Puli reaches Moorthy's house, only to find that Deivanai had killed Moorthy, as he would not spare Kutti Puli. With no trouble, Kutti Puli reunites with Deivanai.

== Cast ==
- Sasikumar as Kutti Puli
- Lakshmi Menon as Bharathi
- Saranya Ponvannan as Deivaanai
- Bala Saravanan as Pappu (Raja)
- Rajasimman as MMS Moorthy
- Lal as Arjunan
- Aadukalam Murugadoss as Kutti Puli's friend
- Rajapandi as Kasakasaa
- D. R. K. Kiran as Villager
- G. Gnanasambandam as Tailor
- Prabha as Chellamma
- Namo Narayana
- Abi Saravanan
- Vaijayanthi
- Ramachandran
- Anburaj
- Hello Kandasamy
- Saravana Sakthi

== Soundtrack ==
Kutti Puli

Soundtrack album by Ghibran
- Released: 20 May 2013
- Genre: Feature film soundtrack
- Language: Tamil
- Label: Saregama
- Producer: Ghibran

Ghibran chronology
Vathikuchi (2013)	Kutti Puli (2013)	Naiyaandi (2013)

The film's score and soundtrack are composed by Ghibran along with lyricist Vairamuthu after their critically acclaimed album 'Vaagai Sooda Vaa'. Saregama south has secured the audio rights of Kuttipuli. The soundtrack was released on 20 May 2013 and received positive reviews. Ghibran stated that some of the music that he had recorded had been replaced in a few places and there was an additional song added. Ilaiyaraaja's "Pon Oviyam" song was used in its entirety in the film and Ghibran said "This was initially very, very emotionally disturbing as both the audiences and the media criticized me in this regard".

Track list
No.	Title	Lyrics	Singer(s)	Length
1.	"Aruvaakaaran"	Vairamuthu	Kaushiki Chakrabarty, Padmalatha
2.	"Kaathu Kaathu"	Vairamuthu	Gold Devaraj
3.	"Aatha Un Selai"	Yegadesi	Sundar Narayana Rao
4.	"Thaattiyare Thaattiyare"	Mohan Rajan	Gold Devaraj
5.	"Aatha Un Selai (instrumental)"		Performed by Nathan

The film includes one more climax song that was not included in the audio soundtrack:

- "Deivam Ellaam Onnagi" – A solo song sung by Sundar Narayana Rao

== Release ==
The film was given a "U/A" certificate by the Indian Censor Board for its violence and gore. The film is said to have been acquired for a large sum of money by Red Giant Movies and Sun Pictures. The film was released in 280 screens on 30 May 2013.

=== Critical reception ===
The film received mixed reviews from critics. The Hindu wrote:"This film, itself, is something of a menagerie, a hodgepodge of "mass" elements. There's romance, fights, thaali-centered drama, drumstick-centered comedy, and – above all – unceasing amma sentiment". Behindwoods wrote:"And if you are the type who would go gaga over mother sentiment, mindless violence, punch dialogues, Kuttipuli may work for you". Indian express wrote:"Kutti Puli is probably the least exciting and engaging of Sasikumar starrers".
