= M. Sasikumar =

Indian actor and film director (born 1974)

M.Sasikumar
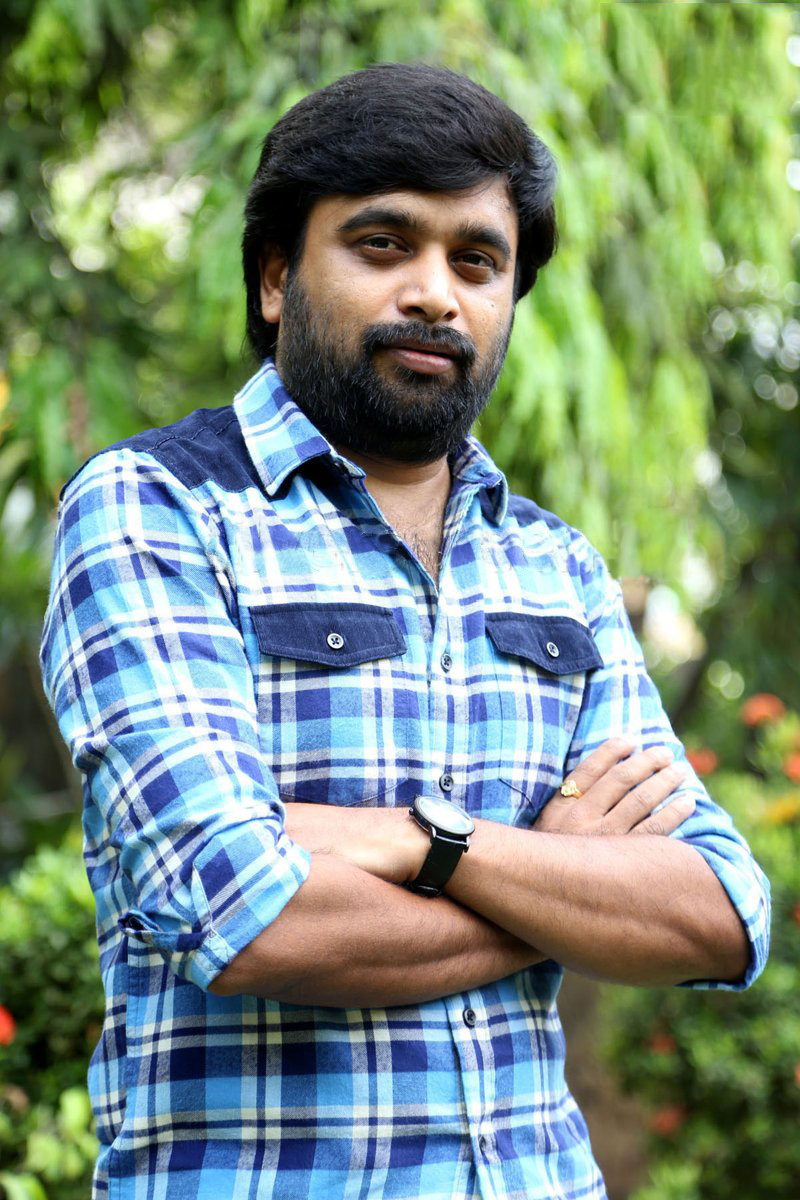
- Born: Sasikumar Mahalingam; 28 September 1974 (age 52); Madurai, Tamil Nadu, India
- Other name: Sasi
- Education: Vellaichamy Nadar College, Madurai
- Occupations: Actor; Film director; Film producer; Screenwriter; Playback singer
- Years active: 1999–present
- Children: 2

Sasikumar Mahalingam (born 28 September 1974) is an Indian actor, film director, film producer, screenwriter and playback singer. He worked as an assistant director for director Bala in Sethu (1999), also worked for director Ameer in his first two films Mounam Pesiyadhe (2002) and Raam (2005).

He is best known in the Tamil film industry for his debut film Subramaniapuram (2008), which became a blockbuster. He has won several accolades including a National Film Award, two Norway Tamil Film Festival Awards, two Filmfare Awards South and one Tamil Nadu State Film Award.

== Early life ==
Sasikumar studied at St. Peters School Kodaikanal and then went on to study business administration in Vellaichamy Nadar College, Madurai.

== Career ==
=== 1999-2018 ===
Sasikumar began working in films through his uncle A Kandasamy, who produced Bala’s Sethu (1999). The actor worked as an assistant director in the film, where he met director Ameer, who was also assisting director Bala. He later assisted Ameer in Mounam Pesiyadhe (2002) and Raam (2005).

Sasikumar's directorial debut Subramaniapuram (2008), despite being made on a low-budget, opened to high critical acclaim and became one of the highest grossing films of the year. After the success of Subramaniapuram, Sasikumar produced Pasanga (2009), directed by debutant Pandiraj. The action drama film Naadodigal (2009) was directed by Samuthrakani. He later directed the drama film Easan (2010). He also acted and produced Poraali (2011) followed by the Malayalam film, Masters (2012) alongside Prithviraj. Masters was followed by the drama film, Sundarapandian (2012). The cast included Lakshmi Menon and Vijay Sethupathi. In 2013, he acted in Kutti Puli, with his previous movie pair Lakshmi Menon. The film released to positive reviews. He produced Thalaimuraigal directed by Balu Mahendra who acted alongside Sasikumar for the first time in his career. In 2014, Sasikumar starred in the romantic action film Bramman.

Sasikumar acted in Bala's Tharai Thappattai and portrayed Sannasi, a nadaswaram player who heads a Karagattam troupe. To look the part, he had to train for a month with folk singers and dancers brought in by Bala, while he also grew long hair for the role. The film's production progressed over two years, while the team were forced to have a three-month break in 2015 after Sasikumar had dislocated his hand while shooting for the film's climax. The soundtrack was composed by Ilaiyaraaja. The film garnered a lot of expectations as it was promoted as being the 1000th film score of Ilaiyaraaja. The soundtrack consisted of seven tracks: five songs and two theme scores. The film was released on 14 January 2016 to mostly positive reviews. Vetrivel, Appa, Kidaari and Balle Vellaiyathevaa follow up. In 2017, he acted in Kodiveeran. This was Sasikumar and M.Muthiah's second collaboration after Kutti Puli. Kodiveeran was produced by M. Sasikumar's Company Productions. In 2018, Sasikumar starred in Asuravadham. The film received mixed reviews from critics and audience.

=== 2019-present ===
Sasikumar started the year with Rajinikanth's' Petta (2019) directed by Karthik Subbaraj. The next project was Suseenthiran's Kennedy Club. In their review, Sify wrote that "Sasikumar is not at all convincing as a Kabbadi player and maintains the same age-old". The film was an average sports drama. Sasikumar was roped in to star in Gautham Vasudev Menon's Enai Noki Paayum Thota (2019), which stars Dhanush and Megha Akash . In the film, Sasikumar acted as Dhanush's elder brother. After Naadodigal 2 (2020), he starred in family films like Udanpirappe (2021), MGR Magan (2021) and Raajavamsam (2021). The subsequent year, he was seen in three action films, Kombu Vatcha Singamda (2022), Naan Mirugamaai Maara (2022) and Kaari (2022). In 2023, Sasikumar was praised for his performance in the drama film Ayothi. In 2024, Garudan and Nandhan were released to positive reviews. Sasikumar starred in Tourist Family (2025), a comedy-drama directed by debutant Abishan Jeevinth which became his highest-grossing release.

== Filmography ==
=== As a film director ===
- All films are in Tamil, unless otherwise noted.

| Year | Film | Notes |
|---|---|---|
| 2008 | Subramaniapuram | Also producer Filmfare Award for Best Film – Tamil; Filmfare Award for Best Director – Tamil; Vijay Award for Best Director; Nominated, Vijay Award for Best Supporting Actor; Nominated, Vijay Award for Best Debut Actor |
| 2010 | Easan | Also producer |

=== As an actor ===
List of M. Sasikumar film acting credits
| Year | Film | Role | Notes | Ref. |
|---|---|---|---|---|
| 1999 | Sethu | Sethu's friend | Uncredited role; also assistant director | |
| 2008 | Subramaniapuram | Paraman | Also producer | |
| 2009 | Naadodigal | Karunakaran Natraj | Nominated, Vijay Award for Favourite Hero | |
| 2010 | Shambo Shiva Shambo | A lover's friend | Telugu film; special appearance | |
| 2011 | Ko | Himself | Special appearance in "Aga Naga" song | |
| 2011 | Poraali | Ilankumaran | Also producer; Norway Tamil Film Festival Award for Best Actor | |
| 2012 | Masters | Milan Paul | Malayalam film | |
| 2012 | Sundarapandian | Sundarapandian | Also producer | |
| 2013 | Kutti Puli | Kutti Puli | | |
| 2013 | Thalaimuraigal | Dr. Adithya | Also producer; guest appearance | |
| 2014 | Bramman | Siva | | |
| 2016 | Tharai Thappattai | Sannasi | Also producer | |
| 2016 | Vetrivel | Vetrivel | | |
| 2016 | Appa | Kumaran | Also producer; guest appearance | |
| 2016 | Kidaari | Kidaari | Also producer | |
| 2016 | Balle Vellaiyathevaa | Vellaiyathevan | Also producer | |
| 2017 | Kodiveeran | Kodiveeran | Also producer | |
| 2018 | Asuravadham | Saravanan | | |
| 2019 | Petta | Malik | | |
| 2019 | Kennedy Club | Muruganadham | | |
| 2019 | Adutha Saattai | Himself | Cameo appearance | |
| 2019 | Enai Noki Paayum Thota | Thiru | | |
| 2020 | Naadodigal 2 | Jeeva | | |
| 2021 | Udanpirappe | Vairavan | | |
| 2021 | MGR Magan | Anbalipu Ravi | | |
| 2021 | Raajavamsam | Kannan | | |
| 2022 | Kombu Vatcha Singamda | Thaman | | |
| 2022 | Naan Mirugamaai Maara | Bhoominathan | | |
| 2022 | Kaari | Sethu | | |
| 2023 | Ayothi | Abdul Malik | | |
| 2024 | Garudan | Aadhi | | |
| 2024 | Nandhan | Ambedkumar aka Koozhpaana | | |
| 2025 | Tourist Family | Dharmadas "Das" | | |
| 2025 | Freedom | Maaran | Unreleased | |
| 2026 | With Love | Dharmadas "Das" | Cameo Appearance | |
| 2026 | My Lord | Muthusirpi | | |

=== Web series ===
| Year | Title | Role | Platform | Ref |
|---|---|---|---|---|
| 2025 | Nadu Center | Coach Selva | JioHotstar | |
| 2026 | Vadhandhi: The Mystery of Mani | SI Moosa Raaza | Amazon Prime Video | |

=== As a producer ===
| Year | Film | Notes |
|---|---|---|
| 2008 | Subramaniapuram | |
| 2009 | Pasanga | Tamil Nadu State Film Award for Best Film |
| 2011 | Poraali | |
| 2012 | Sundarapandian | Norway Tamil Film Festival Award for The Most Popular Film |
| 2013 | Thalaimuraigal | Nargis Dutt Award for Best Feature Film on National Integration |
| 2016 | Tharai Thappattai | |
| 2016 | Kidaari | |
| 2016 | Balle Vellaiyathevaa | |
| 2017 | Kodiveeran | |

=== As a voice actor ===
| Year | Film | Notes |
|---|---|---|
| 2010 | Maathi Yosi | |
| 2014 | Nimirndhu Nil | |
| 2025 | Kumki 2 | |

=== As distributor ===
| Year | Film | Notes |
|---|---|---|
| 2010 | Kathai | only in Madurai region |
