= Kombuseevi =

2025 Tamil gangster drama film

- Theatrical release poster
- Directed by: Ponram
- Written by: Ponram
- Produced by: Mukesh T. Chelliah
- Starring: Shanmuga Pandian; R. Sarathkumar; Tharnika
- Cinematography: Balasubramaniem
- Edited by: Dinesh Ponraj
- Music by: Yuvan Shankar Raja
- Production company: Star Cinemas
- Release date: 19 December 2025
- Country: India
- Language: Tamil

Kombuseevi is a 2025 Indian Tamil-language gangster action drama film written and directed by Ponram. The film stars Shanmuga Pandian, R. Sarathkumar and debutant Tharnika, while George Maryan, Kaali Venkat, Munishkanth, Prabhakar, and Sujith Shankar play supporting roles. The film is produced by debutant producer Mukesh T. Chelliah under Star Cinemas banner. The music was composed by Yuvan Shankar Raja with cinematography by Balasubramaniem and editing by Dinesh Ponraj. Kombuseevi was released in theatres on 19 December 2025.

== Plot ==
Kombuseevi begins in a village near Andipatti, where Rokkapuli is introduced as a ruffian-cum-messiah, who turns to unscrupulous activities like violence and ganja smuggling. He chooses this life since he was forced out of his village and livelihood because of the construction of a dam on the Vaigai River. Later, we see a young Paandi, who is orphaned as both his parents die due to unbearable debts in the face of challenges caused by the construction of the dam. Soon enough, a grown-up Paandi too takes to lawlessness, under the wing of Rokkapuli, who is now the only person the former can call his family.

== Cast ==
- Shanmuga Pandian as Paandi
- R. Sarathkumar as Rokkapuli
- Tharnika as Laila
- George Maryan as Constable Chellapandi
- Kaali Venkat as Constable Mayandi
- Munishkanth as Padayappa
- Prabhakar as Konda Reddy
- Kalki Raja
- Sujith Shankar as SP Karan Dogra
- Ramachandran Durairaj as Konda Reddy's accomplice
- G. Gnanasambandan as Judge
- Indumathy Manikandan as Rokkapuli's wife
- Sreejith Ravi
- Tarun Gopi

== Production ==
=== Development ===
In late-March 2024, it was reported that director Ponram, who had received negative reviews for his last venture DSP (2022), was in talks with late actor-turned-politician Vijayakanth's son Shanmuga Pandian to make a comeback. Shanmuga Pandian, who was gearing up for his next release Padai Thalaivan (2025), would play the lead role opposite to R. Sarathkumar, who had earlier appeared with Vijayakanth in several films such as Pudhu Padagan, Pulan Visaranai, Sandhana Kaatru (all 1990), and Captain Prabhakaran (1991). The film stars debutant actor Tharnika in the female lead role alongside Kaali Venkat, Kalki Raja and others in supporting roles. The film was tentatively titled Production No.1 and is said to be bankrolled by Mukesh T Chelliah under the Star Cinemas banner making its maiden production.

The film has music composed by Yuvan Shankar Raja, cinematography by Balasubramaniem, costume designed by Meenakshi Narayanaswamy, art direction by Saravana Abiraman, and editing by Dinesh Ponraj.

=== Filming and post-production ===
Principal photography commenced on 25 August 2024, coinciding with the birth anniversary of Vijayakanth. On 19 September, the filming began in Theni. Shanmuga Pandian began dubbing for his portions on 20 May 2025. On 14 June 2025, a day after the release of Padai Thalaivan, it was announced that the production had been wrapped.

== Music ==
Kombuseevi

Soundtrack album by Yuvan Shankar Raja
- Released: December 14, 2025
- Genre: Feature film soundtrack
- Language: Tamil
- Label: Saregama
- Producer: Yuvan Shankar Raja

Yuvan Shankar Raja chronology
Mr Zoo Keeper (2025)	Kombuseevi (2025)

Singles from Kombuseevi
- 1. "Unna Naan Paatha" Released: 23 October 2025; 2. "Vasthara" Released: 2 December 2025

External audio
- Kombuseevi - Full Album on YouTube

The music and background score is composed by Yuvan Shankar Raja, with lyrics being penned by Yugabharathi and Snehan. The first single titled "Unna Naan Paatha" was released on 23 October 2025. The second single titled "Vasthara" was released on 2 December 2025. The pre-release audio launch event was conducted in Chennai on 14 December 2025.

Track listing
No.	Title	Lyrics	Singer(s)	Length
1.	"Usilampatti"	Snehan	Yuvan Shankar Raja, Mukesh, Sinduri Vishal
2.	"Unna Naan Paatha"	Yugabharathi	Yuvan Shankar Raja
3.	"Vasthara"	Super Subbu	Yuvan Shankar Raja, Vishnu Priya
4.	"Annan Magan"	Bala Sivasamy	Yuvan Shankar Raja, Velu, Shibi Srinivas, Aravind Annest
5.	"Heyleylo Puleyma"	Dinesh Narasimharaj	Yuvan Shankar Raja, Mathichiyam Bala
6.	"Vazhi Piranthathey"	Ponram	Yuvan Shankar Raja, Anthony Daasan
7.	"Karuppan"	Bala Sivasamy	Yuvan Shankar Raja, Mahalingam
8.	"Amma En Thangakani"	Pa. Vijay	Yuvan Shankar Raja, Ilaiyaraja

== Marketing ==
On 12 October 2024, through a first-look poster, the title of the film Kombuseevi was revealed simultaneously by R. Sarathkumar, Shanmuga Pandian and Premalatha Vijayakanth. On 6 April 2025, coinciding with the lead actor's birthday a 39-second long glimpse was released. The teaser was released on 11 October 2025.

== Release ==
Kombuseevi was released in theatres on 19 December 2025. Earlier it was planned to release during Christmas 2025.

== Reception ==
Rakesh of Times Now Tamil gave the film 2.5/5 stars and wrote, "The biggest tragedy is that we thought that comedy would come from using double meaning dialogues, obscene jokes, and artificial acting. The comedy scenes are so weak that we can't help but wonder if this is the same Ponram that gave us films like 'Varuttapada Vaalibar Sangam' and 'Rajini Murugan'. Moreover, many scenes that lack logic come across as absurd."

Akshay Kumar of Cinema Express gave 2/5 stars and wrote "With the skewed messaging, Kombuseevi cuts a sorry figure and serves as a lesson for filmmakers not to sacrifice their strengths at the altar of experimentation." Harshini SV of The Times of India gave the film 2/5 stars and wrote, " If you are in just for the comedy, Kombuseevi might still have something for you. But otherwise, it’s a film that’s unsure about its own ambitions."

Dina Thanthi wrote, "Director Ponram, who has often driven the double-cart that travels with action on one side and comedy on the other, has driven away without even watching 'Logic'." Vikatan wrote, "Although it is a story centered on history, if the screenplay had been laced with trendy comedy scenes and innovations, this 'Kombuseevi' would have stood up proudly. ".
