= DSP (film) =

2022 Indian Tamil-language action comedy film

- Theatrical release poster
- Directed by: Ponram
- Written by: Ponram
- Produced by: Kaarthekeyen Santhanam
- Starring: Vijay Sethupathi; Anukreethy Vas
- Cinematography: S. Venkatesh; Dinesh B. Krishnan
- Edited by: Vivek Harshan
- Music by: D. Imman
- Production company: Stone Bench Films
- Release date: 2 December 2022
- Running time: 137 minutes
- Country: India
- Language: Tamil
- Box office: ₹11 crore

DSP (Note: The title's expanded form is Deputy superintendent of police.) is a 2022 Indian Tamil-language action thriller film written and directed by Ponram. The film stars Vijay Sethupathi with Anukreethy Vas, while Chaya Devi, Shivani Narayanan, Prabhakar, Pugazh, Ilavarasu, G. Gnanasambandam, Deepa and Singampuli appear in other pivotal roles. It was released theatrically on 2 December 2022 and received mixed to negative reviews from critics.

== Plot ==
At Kasimedu harbour, 'Kasimedu' Jaga hides in a boat with his henchmen. He hears a bang. Vascodagama smashes the wall with a hammer and subsequently arrests Jaga. He gets posted as a Deputy Superintendent of Police (DSP) in Dindugal District. Vascodagama is travelling in a coach and shares his flashback with a fellow passenger.

In a flashback, Vascodagama lives in Dindigul with his parents, his younger sister Sumathi and a cousin named Poovali. His father, Murugapandi, owns a flower business and is the leader of the flower business association. He also has a friend Chandru. Chandru has a caring father. Living in the same village were a dangerous rowdy 'Muttai' Ravi and his brother Raja. At a young age, a ruffian threatened his grandfather's egg shop. So Ravi killed the ruffian by throwing acid eggs on his face, earning the name 'Muttai' Ravi. Vasco's father tells him not to revolt against injustice and to get a government job after he sees Ravi threaten people at the flower market.

Annapoorni lives with her father, Shanmugam, and her two sisters, Kannapoorni and Vannapoorni. Their family has a sweet shop where they work. One day, she attends an exam but forgets her hall ticket. Vascodagama helps her reach home to get the hall ticket. Vascodagama insults her after she fails to give him his employment file. Vascodagama and his father meet Ravi to get a government job, but a friend of Vascodagama persuades them not to meet them, and they leave their place. Vascodagama and his sister always bet money on every alliance his sister has.

Soon, Vascodagama falls in love with Annapoorni. One day, Vascodagama takes Chandru's father to his fields. He tells him that they wish Sumathi to be their daughter-in-law. Later, Ravi's goons stab him, and 'Muttai' Ravi hacks him to death. The police insult Vascodagama. He replies that 'Muttai' Ravi is the murderer. Ravi explains to the MLA that Chandru's father refused to sign the documents, so he killed him.

A few days later, Chandru's family comes asking for Sumathi's hand in marriage. Sumathi and Murugapandi accept the alliance, and Vascodagama hugs Chandru emotionally. Sumathi and Chandru have their engagement, and Vascodagama settles his alliance bets with jewellery. When Vascodagama's friends arrive at the bus stand, they argue with a lorry driver. The driver's owner calls 'Muttai' Ravi and beats up Vascodagama's friends, but Vascodagama arrives and beats up Ravi; this humiliates Ravi. Murugapandi tries to resolve the problem with Ravi, but Ravi slaps him. Murugapandi sends his son away from his daughter's wedding to protect him.

In the present, at a motel near Trichy, Vascodagama gets stabbed and attacked by the neighbouring passenger and a goon organised by Ravi. Later, Vascodagama gets on a train at Dindigul Railway Station. Vascodagama goes to sleep and then narrates what happened after the motel incident.

He recovered from the incident. 'Muttai' Ravi worked as an assistant for MLA Aalamarathan. Aalamarathan suddenly dies of a heart attack, and Ravi collects the dues. He gives the money to the CM and becomes the MLA. Vascodagama beats up Ravi's henchmen but spares Ravi. Ravi warns that he will murder someone in 10 days. Vascodagama confiscates a drone that fell from a tree. He visits his police station and meets his team. Annapoorni informs that 'Mapillai' Vinayagam is her boyfriend. In a few days, an unidentified body appears. Vascodagama's senior officer tells him to kill a criminal called Kalakkad Ramesh. Vascodagama trains his team and successfully kills Ramesh. 'Mapillai' Vinayagam plans a drama with the registrar to get Vascodagama and Annapoorni married. After viewing the drone footage, he sees Ravi's men committing the murder. He catches and beats up Pandi and his men. Eventually, the murder was ordered by Raja, according to Pandi's confession. Vascodagama then murders Raja. In retribution, Ravi orchestrates a nail bomb blast at Batlagundu market.

In the present, Vascodagama wakes up on the train. In Kerala, he follows a train passenger where 'Muttai' Ravi is hiding. In a brief flashback, the explosion killed Chandru and injured Sumathi, and Ravi got fired as MLA. Vascodagama fights with Ravi and throws him into the fire, along with a petrol can, avenging Chandru's death, and Vascodagama leaves.

== Cast ==
- Vijay Sethupathi as M. Vascodagama, later DSP Vascodagama
- Anukreethy Vas as Annapoorani, Vascodagama's love interest (and later his wife)
- Prabhakar as 'Muttai' Ravi (MR)
- Pugazh as Poovaali, Vascodagama's cousin
- Ilavarasu as Murugapandi, Vascodagama's father
- Shivani Narayanan as SI Marikozhundhu
- Ashmitha as 'Muttai' Ravi's wife
- Linga as Chandru, Vascodagama's best friend
- Aadukalam Naren as Chief Minister
- Aadhira Pandilakshmi as Lakshmi Murugapandi
- G. Gnanasambandam as Shanmugam, Annapoorni's father
- R. N. R. Manohar as MLA Aalamarathan
- Deepa Shankar as Inspector Pandiyamma
- Singampuli as Head Constable Uppiliyappan
- George Maryan as Marriage Registrar
- Prithvi Rajan as Selvam, Vascodagama's friend
- Singapore Deepan as Vascodagama’s friend
- Ashwin Raja as Vascodagama's friend
- Sai Tamil as 'Kasimedu' Jaga
- Gajaraj as Subbaiya
- Anish Kuruvilla as Police Commissioner
- Shanthini Theva as Selvam’s wife
- Vishalini as Shanmugam’s wife
- T. M. Karthik as Constable Srikanth
- Karthiga as Chandru’s mother
- Pykara Kaalayan as Kalakkad Ramesh
- Vimal as 'Mapillai' Vinayagam (cameo appearance)
- Rajapandi as 'Muttai' Ravi's gang
- Shiv Aditya as the Drone Boy

== Production ==
The film was tentatively titled VJS46. On 10 November 2022, the title was announced as DSP along with the first look poster of the film being released. The shooting of the film was reportedly completed on 15 February 2022. The actress Anukreethy Vas, who was crowned the Femina Miss India 2018, was signed to play the female lead. Initially, she was to make her acting debut in Prashanth's Vettri, but because of the delay in the release of that film, this film was her acting debut.

== Music ==
DSP

Soundtrack album by D. Imman
- Released: 2022
- Recorded: 2022
- Studios: D. Imman Sound Factory, Chennai
- Genre: Feature film soundtrack
- Language: Tamil
- Label: Sun Network

D. Imman chronology
Kaari (2022)	DSP (2022)	Kazhuvethi Moorkkan (2023)

Initially, it was reported that Ghibran would compose the music for the film, but he was replaced by D. Imman for his fourth collaboration with Ponram after Varuthapadatha Valibar Sangam, Rajinimurugan and Seemaraja and the fifth collaboration with Vijay Sethupathi after Rummy, Rekka, Karuppan and Laabam. The audio rights of the film were purchased by Sun Network. The first single, "Nalla Irumma", was released on 16 November 2022. The second single, "Annapoorani", was released on 30 November 2022.

Track listing
No.	Title	Lyrics	Singer(s)	Length
1.	"Nalla Irumma"	Vijay Muthupandi	Udit Narayan, Senthil Ganesh, Maalavika Sundar	4:13
2.	"Annapoorani"	Ponram	Sid Sriram, Lalitha Vijayakumar	4:36
3.	"Siren Eyes"	-	Instrumental	1:52
4.	"Venaam Thalaiva Adviceu"	Yugabharathi	Javed Ali	4:19
5.	"DSP Rules Theme"	Vijay Muthupandi	Saisharan, Vignesh Narayanan, Arvind Srinivas, Sudharshan Hemara	2:38
6.	"The Ruthless"	-	Instrumental	1:37
7.	"Nalla Irumaa (Karaoke)"	-	-	4:13
8.	"Annapoorani (Karaoke)"	-	-	4:36
Total length:				26:07

== Release ==
=== Theatrical ===
The film was released in theatres on 2 December 2022.

=== Home media ===
The post-theatrical streaming rights of the film were bought by Netflix and Sun NXT. The film was scheduled for a digital premiere on Sun NXT on 30 December 2022.

== Reception ==
Logesh Balachandran of The Times of India gave the film 2 out of 5 and wrote, "DSP falls short of a good mass entertainer but can satisfy the actor's fans." Avinash Ramachandran of Cinema Express gave the film 2.5 out of 5 stars and wrote, "After a rather disappointing outing in his previous film, Ponram manages to get back on track with DSP." Latha Srinivasan of India Today gave the film 2 out of 5 stars and wrote, "On the whole, this movie is a complete miss. Vijay Sethupathi is an extremely talented actor but he needs to make more prudent choices when it comes to his films." Kirubhakar Purushothaman of The Indian Express rated the film 1.5 out of 5 stars and wrote, "The bigger problem with DSP is it doesn't warrant the long runtime when Ponram is only repeating himself with some generic stuff like underwhelming songs and comedy sequences."

Kalyani Pandian of ABP Live gave the film 2.5 out of 5 stars and wrote, "Overall, people might have been saying that DSP has joined Vijay Sethupathi's flop list." Praveen Sudevan of The Hindu wrote, "While the Portuguese voyager of the same name set sails for unexplored territories, with his Vasco da Gama, you head right into the land of cliches." Bharathy Singaravel of The News Minute gave the film 1 out of 5 stars and wrote, "For ardent Vijay Sethupathi fans, this film will be an exhausting letdown." Lakshmi Subramanian of The Week gave the film a rating 2 out of 5 and wrote, "Sethupathi is a crowd-puller who wins the audience with his casual mannerisms and quirky dialogues. In DSP too, Sethupathi does have all these, but fails to impress the audience because of a commonplace plot."
