= Escape Artists Motion Pictures =

Producer of Tamil-language films

- Type: Film Production and Distribution
- Traded as: Escape Artists Motion Pictures
- Industry: Motion Picture
- Headquarters: Chennai, Tamil Nadu, India
- Key people: P.Madan; James

Escape Artists Motion Pictures is an Indian film production studio established by producers Madan and James. Formed in 2010, it has since gone on to produce several Tamil language films. They have also acted as distributors for several Tamil films since 2010.

== Career ==
Escape Artists Motion Pictures was first announced in an article by the Economic Times in 2009, and it was announced that the studio would collaborate with to be the producers of Gautham Vasudev Menon's Vinnaithaandi Varuvaayaa alongside VTV Ganesh and RS Infotainment's Elred Kumar and R. Jayaraman. The romantic coming-of-age story featured Silambarasan and Trisha Krishnan in the lead roles, while A. R. Rahman composed the film's score and soundtrack. Upon release, it achieved positive reviews, with several critics giving "modern classic" status, whilst also becoming a commercially successful venture.

== Filmography ==
=== Producer ===
Year	Film	Director	Cast	Notes
2010	Vinnaithaandi Varuvaayaa	Gautham Vasudev Menon	Silambarasan, Trisha Krishnan	
2011	Azhagarsamiyin Kuthirai	Suseenthiran	Appukutty, Saranya Mohan	
2013	Kedi Billa Killadi Ranga	Pandiraj	Vimal, Sivakarthikeyan, Regina Cassandra, Bindu Madhavi	
2013	Desingu Raja	Ezhil	Vimal, Bindu Madhavi	
2013	Varuthapadatha Valibar Sangam	Ponram	Sivakarthikeyan, Sri Divya, Sathyaraj	
2014	Maan Karate	Thirukumaran	Sivakarthikeyan, Hansika Motwani, Vamsi Krishna	
2014	Kayal	Prabhu Solomon	Chandran, Anandhi	
2016	Mappillai Singam	Rajasekar	Vimal, Anjali	
2016	Kodi	R. S. Durai Senthilkumar	Dhanush, Trisha Krishnan, Anupama Parameswaran	
2019	Enai Noki Paayum Thota	Gautham Vasudev Menon	Dhanush, Megha Akash, Sasikumar	
2021	Nenjam Marappathillai	Selvaraghavan	S.J. Suryah, Nandita Swetha, Regina Cassandra	
2022	Vilangu	Prasanth Pandiyaraj	Vemal, Ineya, Bala Saravanan	Web Series

=== Distributor ===
Year	Film	Director	Cast	Notes
2014	Velaiyilla Pattathari	Velraj	Dhanush, Amala Paul	
2015	Kaaki Sattai	R. S. Durai Senthilkumar	Sivakarthikeyan, Sri Divya	
2015	Paayum Puli	Suseenthiran	Vishal, Kajal Agarwal	
2015	Kirumi	Anucharan	Kathir, Reshmi Menon	
2015	Thoongavanam	Rajesh M. Selva	Kamal Haasan, Trisha Krishnan	
2015	Pasanga 2	Pandiraj	Karthik Kumar, Bindu Madhavi	
2016	Peigal Jaakkirathai	Kanmani	Jeeva Rathnam, Eshaya Maheshwari, Thambi Ramaiah	
2016	Kalam	Robert Raj	Srinivasan, Amzath Khan, Lakshmi Priyaa Chandramouli	
2017	Munnodi	S. P. T. A. Kumar	Harish, Yamini Bhaskar	
