= Padai Thalaivan =

2025 Tamil film by U. Anbu

- Theatrical release poster
- Directed by: U. Anbu
- Written by: Parthiban Desingu (dialogues)
- Screenplay by: Parthiban Desingu
- Produced by: Jaganathan Paramasivam
- Starring: Shanmuga Pandian; Kashthuri Raja; Yamini Chander
- Cinematography: S. R. Sathish Kumar
- Edited by: S. P. Ahmed
- Music by: Ilaiyaraaja
- Production company: VJ Combines
- Distributed by: Open Theatre
- Release date: 13 June 2025
- Running time: 134 minutes
- Country: India
- Language: Tamil

Padai Thalaivan (transl. Army leader) is a 2025 Indian Tamil-language action adventure film directed by U. Anbu, starring Shanmuga Pandian Vijayakanth and Yamini Chander in the lead roles. Vijayakanth in the final acting on using AI Generated in a cameo appearance in this posthumous final film. The film has dialogues and screenplay written by Parthiban Desingu and produced by Jaganathan Paramasivam under his VJ Combines banner. The film also includes a supporting cast of Kasthuri Raja, Munishkanth, M.S. Bhaskar, Karudan Ram, Rishi Rithvik, A. Venkatesh, Yugi Sethu, Sreejith Ravi, Aruldoss and others in supporting roles.

Padai Thalaivan released in theatres on 13 June 2025.

== Plot ==
The mahout man of the forest lived a peaceful life with his elephants. But when the government and the villagers began to encroach on his path, he was forced to adjust. However, he was not one to be easily cowed, and when he could no longer control his anger, he unleashed the power of the rutting elephant. Will the villagers and the police officials ever understand his true nature? Or will they continue to see him as a threat? What happens next forms the rest of the plot .

== Cast ==
- Shanmuga Pandian Vijayakanth as Velu
- Kasthuri Raja as Velu's father
- Yamini Chander
- Munishkanth
- Karudan Ram as Thilagan
- Rishi Rithvik
- A. Venkatesh
- Yugi Sethu as Saravanan
- Sreejith Ravi
- Aruldoss
- Logu NPKS
- Vijayakanth was featured as Professor Ramanaa using AI in a special appearance

== Production ==
=== Development ===
In mid-July 2023, it was reported that Walter (2020) and Rekhla (2022) fame director U. Anbu will be helming Vijayakanth's younger son Shanmuga Pandian's next project tentatively titled Production #1, who was last seen in Madura Veeran (2018). The real-life incident based movie has dialogues and screenplay written by Natpe Thunai (2019) fame Parthiban Desingu. The film is produced by Jaganathan Paramasivam under his VJ Combines banner in association with Rajukalidass's Dass Pictures. The technical team consists of cinematographer SR Sathish Kumar, editor S.P. Ahamed, and stunt choreographer Mahesh Mathew.

=== Casting ===
Yamini Chander, granddaughter of A. C. Tirulokchandar who is known for her roles in Nenjuku Needhi (2022) and Dinosaurs (2023) was cast as the female lead. The film also features, director Kasthuri Raja in an important role alongside, Munishkanth, M.S. Bhaskar, Karudan Ram, Rishi Rithvik, A. Venkatesh, Yugi Sethu, Sreejith Ravi, Aruldoss and others in supporting roles. It was reported that Raghava Lawrence was approached to essay a cameo appearance in the film, after his interest to work with Shanmuga Pandian.

=== Filming ===
Principal photography began after a pooja ceremony on 14 July 2023 in Chennai. In an interview with Cinema Express, Anbu revealed that the first schedule of 20 days got wrapped in Kerala, while the second schedule was then planned to commence by 8 September 2023 in locations like Bangkok and Odisha.

== Music ==
Padai Thalaivan

Soundtrack album by Ilaiyaraaja
- Studios: Ilaiyaraaja Studios, Chennai
- Genre: Feature film soundtrack
- Language: Tamil
- Label: MRT Music
- Producer: Ilaiyaraaja

Ilaiyaraaja chronology
Dinasari (2025)	Padai Thalaivan (2025)

Singles from Padai Thalaivan
- 1. "Un Mugathai Paarkkalaiyae" Released: 30 November 2024

The soundtrack and background is composed by Ilaiyaraaja. The first single "Un Mugathai Paarkkalaiyae" was released on 30 November 2024.

Track listing
No.	Title	Lyrics	Singer(s)	Length
1.	"Un Mugathai Paarkkalaiyae"	Ilaiyaraaja	Ananya Bhat

== Marketing ==
On the occasion of Vijayakanth's birthday, on 25 August 2023, the title-reveal first-look poster was released, revealing the title of the film as Padai Thalaivan. On 13 December 2024, a two-minute long trailer was released, with the song late-Vijayakanth's song "Nee Pottu Vacha" from his film 1989 film Ponmana Selvan and his AI appearance. Furthur a dialogue, "If my father was here now, he would ask me to protect the people who trusted me." by Shanmuga Pandian was added as a tribute to his father. The pre-release audio launch event was held in Chennai on 15 May 2025 in the presence of AR Murugadoss, M. Sasikumar, Ponram and other important personalities.

== Release ==
=== Theatrical ===
Padai Thalaivan released in theatres on 13 June 2025. Earlier it was scheduled for 23 May 2025, but got postponed citing screen allocation issues, without informing a specific date. Earlier it was scheduled for Pongal 2025.

== Reception ==
Akshay Kumar of Cinema Express gave 2.5/5 stars and wrote "Padai Thalaivan, with the potential of pulling off something impressive, ends up being a confused film. The writers' dilemma is whether to pen a film exploring the bond between a human and an animal or an outsider coming to a village to break the shackles of slavery and vanquish the tyrant." Abhinav Subramanian of The Times of India gave 2/5 stars and wrote "The film splits itself into two distinct halves that barely speak to each other.[...] Padai Thalaivan has the bones of an engaging adventure but forgets that even simple stories need characters who think before they act." Ka. Dharmarajaguru of Dinamani gave 1.5/5 stars, emphasizing on the importance to be given on the story, screenplay and the selection of actors. A critic of Daily Thanthi reviewed the film by praising its screenplay but criticized the logical violations.
