= Madurai Veeran (disambiguation) =

Madurai Veeran is a folk deity popular in southern Tamil Nadu, India.

Madurai Veeran may also refer to:

- Madurai Veeran (1939 film), a 1939 Tamil film directed by T. P. Rajalakshmi
- Madurai Veeran (1956 film), a 1956 Tamil film directed by D. Yoganand
- Madurai Veeran (2007 film), a 2007 Tamil film directed by Vincent Selva

== See also ==
- Madura Veeran, a 2018 Tamil film directed by P. G. Muthiah
