= Naadodigal Gopal =

Indian character actor and comedian (died 2020)

- Born: K.K.P. Gopalakrishnan
- Died: 5 February 2020 (aged 54)
- Occupations: Character actor; comedian
- Years active: 2009–2020
- Spouse: Kavitha Gopal
- Children: 2

Naadodigal Gopal was an Indian character actor who worked over 30 films Tamil cinema.

== Career ==
Originally a farmer and businessman made his debut Naadodigal (2009) directed by his friend Samuthirakani and the success of the film meant that he appended the film to his stage name as Naadodigal Gopal. His notable films include Kedi Billa Killadi Ranga (2012), Varuthapadatha Valibar Sangam (2013), Rajinimurugan (2016), Raja Manthiri (2016), Seemaraja (2018) and Namma Veetu Pillai (2019) garnered acclaim. He has often acted in several films with directors Samuthirakani, Ponram and Pandiraj. His last film was Annaatthe (2021) directed by Siva released after his death.

== Death ==
Gopal died from a heart attack on 5 February 2020. He was 54 years old.

== Filmography ==
Films

Year	Film	Role	Notes
2009	Naadodigal	Nallammaal's father	
2010	Tha	Surya's father	
2011	Poraali	Villager	
2012	Vettai	Police officer	
2013	Kedi Billa Killadi Ranga	Mithra's father	
2013	Varuthapadatha Valibar Sangam	Perumal	
2014	Nimirndhu Nil	Basavayya	
2015	Kaaval	Gopalaswamy	
2016	Rajinimurugan	Thotathree's father	
2016	Raja Manthiri	Karthi and Suriya's father	
2016	Kidaari	Pulikutthi's brother	
2017	Thondan	Sikkal Shanmugasundaram	
2017	Guru Uchaththula Irukkaru	Village panchayat leader	
2018	Azhagumagan	Uncle	
2018	Seema Raja	Selvi's adopted father/uncle	
2019	Kolanji	Villager	
2019	Namma Veetu Pillai	Arumpon's paternal uncle	
2019	Adutha Saattai	Aadhi's father	
2020	Naadodigal 2	Gopal	
2021	Kalathil Santhippom	Anand's father	Posthumous release
2021	Annaatthe	Soorakottai villager	Posthumous release

Short films

- Wake Up Call (2016)
