= Thavasi (actor) =

Indian comedian and actor

- Born: Thavasi; 1960; Madurai District, Madras State, India
- Died: November 23, 2020 (aged 59–60); Madurai, Tamil Nadu, India
- Years active: 1993–2020

Thavasi (1960 – 23 November 2020) was an Indian actor known for his work in Tamil films.

== Early life ==
Thavasi hailed from the village of Mattaparai near Nilakkottai in the Dindigul district of Tamil Nadu, India. He is from Madurai.

== Career ==
Thavasi began his film career with Kizhakku Cheemayile (1993), directed by Bharathiraja. He established himself as a reliable supporting actor, frequently portraying Hindu priests from rural backgrounds. He was noted for his expressive body language, method acting, composed demeanour, distinct rough voice, and comedic timing. His long moustache became a signature part of his appearance.

He gained wider recognition in Varuthapadatha Valibar Sangam (2013).

His final film appearance was in Annaatthe (2021), directed by Siva, starring Rajinikanth in the lead role.

== Filmography ==
- Kizhakku Cheemayile (1993)
- Kalavani (2010)
- Azhagarsamiyin Kuthirai (2011)
- Mannaru (2012)
- Sundarapandian (2012)
- Varuthapadatha Valibar Sangam (2013)
- Nedunchaalai (2014)
- Appuchi Graamam (2014)
- Komban (2015)
- Rajinimurugan (2016)
- Adra Machan Visilu (2016)
- Arthanari (2016)
- Kadalai (2016)
- Ilami (2016)
- Mersal (2017)
- Kodiveeran (2017)
- Kaalakkoothu (2018)
- Seemaraja (2018)
- Kanne Kalaimaane (2019)
- LKG (2019)
- Naadodigal 2 (2020)
- Ka Pae Ranasingam (2020)
- Annaatthe (2021; posthumously released)
- Aaryamala (2024; posthumously released)

== Death ==
Thavasi was diagnosed with esophageal cancer and died on 23 November 2020, following an eight-month battle with the illness. Just days before his death, he publicly appealed for financial support from fellow actors and the general public to cover his medical expenses.

He died at Saravana Hospital in Madurai. Toward the end of his life, he underwent extensive treatment.
