= Mapla Singam =

2016 Indian film by N. Rajasekar

- Theatrical release poster
- Directed by: N. Rajasekar
- Written by: Don Ashok
- Produced by: P.Madan
- Starring: Vimal; Soori; Anjali
- Cinematography: V. S. Tharun Balaji
- Edited by: Vivek Harshan
- Music by: N. R. Raghunanthan
- Production company: Escape Artists Motion Pictures
- Release date: 11 March 2016
- Country: India
- Language: Tamil

Mapla Singam (transl. Lion Groom) is a 2016 Indian Tamil-language romantic comedy film directed by N. Rajasekar. The film stars Vimal and Anjali, with Soori in a supporting role. Don Ashok has penned the dialogs. N. R. Raghunanthan has scored the music, whereas cinematography was done by V. S. Tharun Balaji and editing by Vivek Harshan. The film released on 11 March 2016.

== Plot ==
Sevagapandian (Radha Ravi) is a politician living with his only daughter Vinodhini (Madhumila) and his nephew Anbuchelvan (Vimal). Anbu accompanies Sevagapandian in his political meetings and treats his cousin Vinodhini as his own sister. Vinodhini falls in love with Satish (Vishnu) and discloses this to Anbu, requesting to convince Sevagapandian. Anbu waits for the right time to disclose Vinodhini's love to Sevagapandian. Meanwhile, Anbu falls in love with Sailaja (Anjali), who happens to be Satish's sister, and she too reciprocates.

Sevagapandian is against love marriages and starts looking for an alliance for Vinodhini. Vinodhini asks her father to postpone her wedding for a few years as she prefers to get employed, but Sevagapandian refuses. Vinodhini goes missing, and everyone assumes that she has eloped with Satish. Sevagapandian and his henchmen thrash Satish's home, leaving their family members insulted. However, it is revealed that Vinodhini has gone to Coimbatore for a job interview. Anbu feels bad for Sevagapandian's behavior and apologizes to Shailaja.

Sevagapandian speeds up Vinodhini's marriage arrangements, and Vinodhini decides to marry Satish in a registrar's office. Anbu understands Vinodhini's situation and agrees to help her. Vinodhini marries Satish. Sevagapandian gets furious and tells Anbu to take revenge on Satish's family by marrying Shailaja, not knowing that Anbu and Shailaja are already in love. Anbu uses this opportunity and marries Shailaja.

== Cast ==
- Vimal as Anbuchelvan
- Anjali as Sailaja
- Soori as Anbu's uncle
- Kaali Venkat as Anbu's cousin
- Adam Greig as Bill
- Radha Ravi as Sevagapandian Thevar, Anbu's uncle
- Pandiarajan as District Collector
- G. Gnanasambandam as Anbu's father
- Meera Krishnan as Anbu's mother
- Jayaprakash as Sailaja's father
- Vanitha Krishnachandran as Sailaja's mother
- Munishkanth as Mahesh Babu
- Madhumila as Vinodhini, Anbu's sister
- Vishnu as Satish, Anbu's brother-in-law
- G. Marimuthu as Elamaran
- Swaminathan as Mama
- Vidyullekha Raman as Selvi
- Yogi Babu as Politician
- Mayilsamy
- Manobala
- Singamuthu
- Rajendranath as Inspector Thangavel
- Supergood Subramani as Marriage Broker
- Usilai Ganesh as Usilai
- Rajesh Gopalan
- Radha
- Pulipandi
- Thenali
- Aravaan Murugan
- Baba Bhaskar (special appearance in the song "Vandhaaru Vandhaaru")

== Production ==
Escape Artists Motion Pictures announced that they would fund a film to be directed by N. Rajasekar, an erstwhile assistant of Ezhil. The film began production in November 2014, with a photo shoot taking place with Vimal, Anjali and Soori. A Scottish pianist, working at A.R.Rahman's KM Music Conservatory, Adam Greig, was selected to portray a foreigner in the film, featuring in comedy scenes alongside Soori.

== Soundtrack ==
The music was composed by N. R. Raghunanthan.

Mapla Singam

Soundtrack album by N. R. Raghunanthan
- Released: 2016
- Length: 29:42
- Language: Tamil
- Label: Sony Music South
- Producer: N. R. Raghunanthan

N. R. Raghunanthan chronology
Sivappu (2015)	Mapla Singam (2016)	Adra Machan Visilu (2016)

Track list
No.	Title	Singer(s)	Length
1.	"Vandhaaru Vandhaaru"	Jayamoorthy	04:17
2.	"Oruvaatti"	Naresh Iyer	04:01
3.	"Edhukku Machan"	Aalap Raju, Velmurugan	05:17
4.	"Edhukku Machan (film version)"	Sivakarthikeyan, Anirudh Ravichander	04:21
5.	"Edhuvumae Thonnale"	Naresh Iyer	04:02
6.	"Kaara Karuuna"	M. L. R. Karthikeyan, Kalpana Raghavendar	03:44
7.	"Oruvaatti (Reprise)"	Vandana Srinivasan	04:00
Total length:			29:42

== Reception ==
Times of India gave the movie 3 stars stating " Two warring groups in a village, romance that blossoms between the youngsters in these groups, and a happy ending! Before you say 'Yawn!', here's the news. Mapla Singam is actually not bad. The film seems to have been cut from the same cloth as films like Varuthapadatha Valibar Sangam. Sivakarthikeyan has made a career out of these films, and Vemal's attempts have largely gone unnoticed. Perhaps this one could do the magic."
