= Namma Veettu Pillai =

2019 Indian Tamil-language action drama film

- Theatrical release poster
- Directed by: Pandiraj
- Written by: Pandiraj
- Produced by: Kalanithi Maran
- Starring: Sivakarthikeyan; Aishwarya Rajesh; Anu Emmanuel
- Cinematography: Nirav Shah
- Edited by: Ruben
- Music by: D. Imman
- Production company: Sun Pictures
- Distributed by: Red Giant Movies
- Release date: 27 September 2019
- Running time: 152 minutes
- Country: India
- Language: Tamil

Namma Veettu Pillai (transl. The child of our house) is a 2019 Indian Tamil-language action comedy film written and directed by Pandiraj and produced by Kalanithi Maran under the banner Sun Pictures. The film stars Sivakarthikeyan and Aishwarya Rajesh, with a supporting cast including Anu Emmanuel, Samuthirakani, Soori, Bharathiraja, and Natty Subramaniam. The movie marks the third collaboration between Pandiraj and Sivakarthikeyan after Marina and Kedi Billa Killadi Ranga. The music for the film is scored by D. Imman, while cinematography and editing are handled by Nirav Shah and Ruben. The film was released on 27 September 2019. The film received a positive response from the audience and became a successful venture at the box office.

== Plot ==
Arumpon is a village youth from Tirupathur who has a beloved step-sister Thulasi. Arumpon holds a puberty showering function for his sister despite hesitance from his maternal uncles, who disregard Thulasi for unknown reasons. Even his paternal uncles disregard Arumpon's family and consider Thulasi as a curse on their family. The only people who care for Arumpon's family are his grandfather, Arunmozhivarman, and his cousin, Paramu. Arumpon develops an affection with his maternal cousin Maangani, despite her father's disapproval. Arumpon actively looks for an alliance with his sister because his maternal uncle disapproves of Thulasi being married to their sons. Despite Arumpon finding a prospective groom for his sister, his paternal uncle foils it, and Thulasi's engagement is called off. Arumpon and Paramu have a running feud with Ayyanar, a ruffian and his uncle since they closed Ayyanar's liquor shop and stopped them from selling agricultural land via a court order. So, Ayyanar decides to marry Thulasi for retribution. Arumpon reluctantly agrees to the marriage on his mother's and Thulasi's insistence. It is revealed that Thulasi is Arumpon's adopted sister who was the daughter of Dharma, a close friend of Arumpon's late father Chandrabose, who adopted Thulasi after Dharma's death. Chandrabose later got killed after failing to save Esakki, Thulasi's biological brother, from getting electrocuted due to a faulty wire caused by Chandrabose's enemies.

Ayyanar tries to insult Arumpon at every turn, but Arumpon takes it with a light heart since he is his brother-in-law. Thulasi was falsely arrested for Ayyanar's illegal liquor hoarding. When confronted by Thulasi, Ayyanar hits her. Arumpon mercilessly thrashes Ayyanar for retribution. Following this incident, Ayyanar's close friend Paari comes with men to seek him and go after Arumpon for retribution. In a heated exchange, Paari insults Ayyanar for getting beaten up by his brother-in-law and in a drunken stupor, Ayyanar kills Paari accidentally. After realising what has transpired, Paari's men attempt to kill Ayyanar. Ayyanar escapes from them but is not closely trailed by men out for blood. No one comes for Ayyanar's rescue even his maternal uncle, but Arumpon and Thulasi manage to rescue him and hand him over to the police. Enraged by this, they seek to kill Arumpon too. To end this problem without bloodshed, Arumpon, his mother, and his sister surrender to the panchayat of Paari's village. He explains that he knows the suffering of growing up without a father and wants to end this without further loss of life. Even though he can beat up every goon there and escape, he does not wish to do so. He offers to marry Paari's widowed wife, but she compliments Arumpon's good nature and not wanting to make Thulasi a widow agrees to end this peacefully.

During the film's closing credits, it is intended that Arumpon, Thulasi, and his mother have reconciled with the rest of the extended family. Ayyanar has been released on parole to attend Thulasi's seemantham (Baby shower) and it is revealed that he made peace with Arumpon. The film ends comically with Arumpon breaking the fourth wall mimicking his grandfather.

== Cast ==
The cast includes:

- Sivakarthikeyan as Arumpon
  - Dhashwanth as Young Arumpon
- Aishwarya Rajesh as Thulasi, Arumpon's adopted sister
  - Sheeshrika as Young Thulasi
- Anu Emmanuel as Maangani Shivashakthi aka Mango, Arumpon's cousin & love interest
- Soori as Paramu, Arumpon's cousin
- Natty Subramaniam as Ayyanar, Thulasi's husband
- Samuthirakani as Chandrabose, Arumpon's father
- Bharathiraja as Arunmozhivarman, Chandrabose's father and Arumpon's grandfather
- Archana as Thenmozhi Chandrabose, Arumpon's mother
- R. K. Suresh as Dharmar, Thulasi's father
- Shanmugarajan as Maangani's father
- Sheela Rajkumar as Thulasi's mother
- Aadukalam Naren as Ayyanar's maternal uncle
- Vazhakku En Muthuraman as Arumpon's maternal uncle
- Vela Ramamoorthy as Maniyakkarar, Arumpon's eldest paternal uncle
- Subbu Panchu as Kani, Arumpon's youngest paternal uncle
- Naadodigal Gopal as Arumpon's paternal uncle
- Rama as Maniyakkarar's wife
- Aadhira Pandilakshmi as Arumpon's paternal aunt
- Vasumitra as Paari
- Arundhati as Paari's wife
- K. P. Jagan as Paari's brother-in-law
- Sangili Murugan as Sangili
- Myna Nandhini as Kottravai
- Thamizh as Kottravai's husband
- Karate Venkatesan
- Rajith Menon
- Master Anbukarasu as Mundhirikottai, Paramu’s son
- Yogi Babu as Ayyanar's lawyer
- TSR Srinivasan as Arunmozhivarman's friend
- Pandiraj in a cameo appearance

== Soundtrack ==
Namma Veettu Pillai

Soundtrack album by D. Imman
- Released: 1 September 2019
- Recorded: 2019
- Genre: Feature film soundtrack
- Length: 52:20
- Language: Tamil
- Labels: Sun Pictures; Divo
- Producer: D. Imman

D. Imman chronology
| Bakrid (2019) | Namma Veettu Pillai (2019) | Seeru (2020) |
External audio
- Audio Jukebox on YouTube

Singles from Namma Veettu Pillai
- 1. "Yenga Annan" Released: 23 August 2019; 2. "Mailaanji" Released: 28 August 2019; 3. "Yenakkaagave Poranthavaley" Released: 8 October 2019 (After the film's release)

The music for the film was composed by D. Imman, with lyrics by Yugabharathi, Vignesh Shivan, Arunraja Kamaraj, GKB and actor Sivakarthikeyan. This is Imman's fifth and final collaboration with Sivakarthikeyan and his second collaboration with director Pandiraj.

The first single, "Yenga Annan" was released on 23 August 2019 with lyrics by Vignesh Shivan and sung by Nakash Aziz and Sunidhi Chauhan. The second single "Mailaanji" was released on 28 August 2019 with lyrics by Yugabharathi and sung by Shreya Ghoshal and Pradeep Kumar.

The full soundtrack was released on 1 September 2019, with Sivakarthikeyan, composer Imman, director Pandiraj and other cast and crew in attendance. The launch event was telecast on Sun TV, on 8 September 2019. After the film's release, an additional song from the film titled "Yenakkaagave Poranthavaley" which is sung by Sathyaprakash and written by Yugabharathi was released on 8 October 2019 through all digital streaming platforms.

Track listing
| No. | Title | Lyrics | Singer(s) | Length |
|---|---|---|---|---|
| 1. | "Yenga Annan" | Vignesh Shivan | Nakash Aziz, Sunidhi Chauhan | 4:27 |
| 2. | "Mailaanji" | Yugabharathi | Shreya Ghoshal, Pradeep Kumar | 4:03 |
| 3. | "Unkoodave Porakkanum" (Brother's Version) | GKB | Sid Sriram | 4:20 |
| 4. | "Jigiri Dosthu" | Arunraja Kamaraj | Jayamoorthy, Anthakudi Ilayaraja | 5:28 |
| 5. | "Unkoodave Porakkanum" (Sister's Version) | GKB | Shashaa Tirupati | 4:20 |
| 6. | "Gaandakannazhagi" | Sivakarthikeyan | Anirudh Ravichander, Neeti Mohan | 4:03 |
| 7. | "Namma Veettu Pillai" (Theme Song) | Arunraja Kamaraj | D. Imman | 2:54 |
| 8. | "Unkoodave Porakkanum" (Instrumental – Violin) | Instrumental | Sruthi Balamurali | 4:20 |
| 9. | "Yenga Annan" (Karaoke) | | | 4:27 |
| 10. | "Mailaanji" (Karaoke) | | | 4:03 |
| 11. | "Unkoodave Porakkanum" (Karaoke) | | | 4:20 |
| 12. | "Gaandakannazhagi" (Karaoke) | | | 4:03 |
| 13. | "Yenakkaagave Poranthavaley" (Additional Track) | Yugabharathi | Sathyaprakash | 2:01 |
| Total length: | | | | 52:20 |

== Release ==
The film was released worldwide on 27 September 2019.

=== Reception ===
The Times of India rated 3 out of 5, stating that "As a family drama, Namma Veettu Pillai is perfectly OK even though it offers us nothing new in terms of story or treatment."

Sify rated the film 3 out of 5 stars, viewing that "Namma Veettu Pillai is a well-made rural family drama which is highly recommended!"

The Indian Express rated the film 3 out of 5, and summarised that "Barring a few missteps, this Sivakarthikeyan-starrer is a definite crowd-pleaser."

India Today rated the film 2.5 out of 5 stars and summarised that "Director Pandiraj's Namma Veetu Pillai starring Sivakarthikeyan is reminiscent of the filmmaker's previous film Kadaikutty Singam. However, the emotional connection seems to be missing in Namma Veetu Pillai."

Baradwaj Rangan of Film Companion South wrote " With better writing throughout, the climax would have made you weep. But, as empty emotional entertainers go, Namma Veettu Pillai isn't a total loss".

== Box office ==
The film collected ₹50 crore (US$7.79 million) in Tamil Nadu on 5 weeks.

== Legacy ==
The song "Jigiri Dosthu" inspired the title of a 2023 film.
