= Ramanaa =

2002 film by A. R. Murugadoss

- Theatrical poster
- Directed by: A. R. Murugadoss
- Written by: A. R. Murugadoss
- Produced by: V. Ravichandran
- Starring: Vijayakanth; Simran; Ashima Bhalla
- Cinematography: M. S. Prabhu
- Edited by: Suresh Urs
- Music by: Ilaiyaraaja
- Production company: Aascar Films
- Distributed by: Aascar Films
- Release date: 4 November 2002
- Running time: 178 minutes
- Country: India
- Language: Tamil

Ramanaa is a 2002 Indian Tamil-language vigilante action thriller film written and directed by A. R. Murugadoss, stars Vijayakanth, Simran (in a cameo appearance) and Ashima Bhalla in lead roles. The film is about a man named Ramanaa who decides to abolish corruption completely with the help of his ex-students who are working in various government offices. The film released on 4 November 2002. It received positive reviews from critics and became a hit. It was awarded the 2002 Tamil Nadu State Film Award for Best Film and A. R. Murugadoss won the Tamil Nadu State Film Award for Best Dialogue Writer. The film was dubbed and released in Hindi as Mar Mitenge 3 in 2015.

== Plot ==
Ramanaa begins with the abduction of 15 tahsildars across various parts of Tamil Nadu. After three days in captivity, 14 officers are released, but one's body is found in Trichy. The police find a tape recording and a file on the dead officer's body that provide significant evidence concerning the kidnapping and subsequent murder. The files suggest that the crimes were committed by members of the self-proclaimed "Anti-Corruption Force" (ACF), a citizen militia seeking to eliminate corruption through vigilante acts. The group proclaims that they will kidnap the top 15 corrupt officials in each department, keep them in captivity for a week, and kill the most corrupt one.

The film then shifts to Dr M. Ramanaa, a mild-mannered professor at National College in Chennai, who lives with four adopted kids. While treating his adopted child at a big private hospital, Ramanaa discovers that the officials at the facility are engaging in extortion and fraud. After sending his kids home, he goes to the government hospital, brings a recently dead poor man's body to the private hospital, and tricks them into treating a dead man. The hospital staff falls for the trick and tries to extort a heavy sum using the body. Ramanaa pays all the fees and collects all the documents. When the doctors inform him that the patient is dead, he reveals the trick. Rishi, the hospital's heir, bargains with Ramanaa but eventually pays him two million rupees. Ramanaa takes the money he paid the hospital and gives the remaining huge sum to the poor man's family. He also sends copies of the reports to the incoming President of India A. P. J. Abdul Kalam. Due to government pressure, the hospital and college are closed off.

Rishi commits suicide when he is about to be arrested. His grief-stricken father, a big and powerful construction magnate named Bhadrinarayanan, returns from Mumbai and vows to take revenge on the man responsible for his son's death. Meanwhile, the ACF goes on to kidnap the top 15 corrupt officials each month for four months and then kills the #1. Those officials include officials from departments of transport, PWD, revenue, sports, health, etc. Devaki, a college girl and friend of Ramanaa's kids, finds out about him being the leader of the ACF. She questions him about this immoral activity.

Seven years ago, Ramanaa was a college professor with a small, cute family consisting of him, his nine-month pregnant wife Chithra, and his daughter. During the festival of Deepavali, Ramanaa's apartment building collapses due to heavy construction work nearby, killing many residents, including Chitra and his daughter. Recovering from the incident, he demands to know who was responsible for the building's collapse. He discovers that the building was built and owned by Bhadri, who knowingly constructed the complex on loose soil. When Ramanaa confronts the District Council with evidence, Bhadri walks in and boasts about all the bribes he has thrown to the top district officials, including the collector. He gives Ramanaa a chance to call any two top officials in the state and get him arrested, but both called officials immediately hang up. Frustrated, Ramanaa seals the room and attacks all officers, and as he is about to kill Bhadri, he is beaten badly by his men and is thrown onto a highway. He is then rescued by National College students, who were on a trip. In response to Bhadri's actions and the general regional corruption, Ramanaa forms the ACF.

Meanwhile, a local police constable, frustrated at not being promoted because he could not bribe officials, begins secretly building the case against the ACF. The constable eventually realizes that the ACF is primarily composed of people who do not take bribes. He visits multiple revenue offices, but his superiors neglect him because he is their low associate. Then, a message comes saying that civil supply officers are going to be taken. All corrupt officials try to get police protection by proving their corruption, but at the last moment, the ACF switches to the Police department. All corrupt civil supply officers are immediately arrested, and the government promises to employ 25,000 youngsters within a week. 15 district police Superintendent of Police are kidnapped. The police officer is killed, and everyone is frustrated. A Punjabi IPS officer is flown from Delhi to head the case.

Meanwhile, Bhadri tries to re-corrupt the officials he comes into contact with. As the final stroke, the top 15 dons are kidnapped. Ramanaa personally comes to Bhadri. As was done to him, he gives Bhadri the same lifeline of calling any two people within India. This time, Bhadri fails and is kidnapped and later killed. Then, the constable reveals his plan to his superiors, and the IPS officer is delighted.

The officer takes swift action against them. The ACF members are captured and tortured by the police but refuse to reveal Ramanaa's identity. Ramanaa is overcome with guilt over his students' sacrifice and surrenders himself on the condition that all the other ACF members be released. He is tried and convicted of being the mastermind organizer behind the murders of Bhadri and five other government officials. He does not reject the accusations and is swiftly sentenced to death. He accepts the sentence and refuses to appeal to higher courts.

Public pressure from the sympathetic community and family prompts the Chief Minister of Tamil Nadu to visit Ramanaa in prison, and he offers him a pardon. However, Ramanaa refuses, stating that only he must face the final consequences of his actions. He asks for a covert visit to meet his children. He meets them when they are asleep and bids them a teary farewell. Students pour into the city, and tensions build up. The government asks Ramanaa to give a speech to control the people. The next day Ramanaa appeals to the public and asks them to avoid corruption at all costs. Minutes later, he is hanged. The constable is offered a promotion for his role in disbanding the ACF, but he refuses out of guilt.

== Cast ==
- Vijayakanth as M. Ramanaa
- Simran as Chithra (cameo appearance)
- Ashima Bhalla as Devaki
- Vijayan as Bhadrinarayanan
- Yugi Sethu as Constable Saravanan
- Riyaz Khan as Rishi, Bhadrinarayanan's son
- Ravichandran as Chief Minister of Tamil Nadu
- Rajesh as Ka. Parandhaman IAS, District Collector
- Sudarshan as Investigation Officer
- Ravikumar as Investigation Officer Radhakrishnan
- Mukesh Rishi as Jalandhar Singh, IPS
- Durai as ACF Member Gopi
- Kalyani as Ramana's adopted daughter from Coimbatore
- Pooja Sundharesh as Priya, Ramanaa's late daughter
- Shruthi as Sharmi, Ramanaa's apartment neighbour
- Amanda Deal as Ramana's adopted daughter
- Karthik as Ramana's adopted son
- Saakib Singh as Ramana's adopted Gujarati son
- Kalairani as an ACF member's mother
- U. B. G. Menon as Investigation Officer
- Ilavarasu as PWD Officer
- Mahanadhi Shankar as Rowdy
- Sampath Ram as Rowdy
- Pondy Ravi as a dead patient's husband
- Crane Manohar as College Peon
- Theni Kunjarammal as Ramanaa's neighbour
- Meesai Rajendranath as Tirunelveli Inspector Palpandi (voice by Nellai Siva)
- Junior Silk Rekha as a dancer in Alli Mudicha song

== Production ==
The film was initially titled as Valluvan. Yugi Sethu replaced R. Madhavan in the role of a constable in the film. A. R. Murugadoss initially wanted Natty Subramaniam to work as the film's cinematographer but then he was about to work on Black Friday (2004).

== Soundtrack ==
Ramanaa

Soundtrack album by Ilaiyaraaja
- Released: 2002
- Genre: Feature film soundtrack
- Labels: Star Music; Nic Audio
- Producer: Ilaiyaraaja

Ilaiyaraaja chronology
Ninu Choodaka Nenundalenu (2002)	Ramanaa (2002)	Solla Marandha Kadhai (2002)

The soundtrack was composed by Ilaiyaraaja, and is the only collaboration by Murugadoss and Ilaiyaraaja. The soundtrack has 8 songs.

Track list
No.	Title	Lyrics	Singer(s)	Length
1.	"Vaanaviley"	Palani Bharathi	Hariharan, Sadhana Sargam	5:15
2.	"Vennilavin"	Palani Bharathi	Hariharan, Sadhana Sargam	5:51
3.	"Vaanam Adhirave"	Mu. Metha	P. Unnikrishnan, Sadhana Sargam, Bhavatharini, Chorus	4:58
4.	"Oorukkoru"	Palani Bharathi	Ilaiyaraaja	5:01
5.	"Vaanaviley"	Palani Bharathi	Ilaiyaraaja, Sadhana Sargam	5:15
6.	"Alli Mudicha"	Mu. Metha	Pushpavanam Kuppusamy, Swarnalatha	5:20
7.	"Angey Yaaru Paaru"	Palani Bharathi	Karthik, Tippu, S. N. Surendar, Yuvan Shankar Raja	5:05
8.	"Vaanaviley"	Palani Bharathi	Sadhana Sargam	5:15

== Release ==
=== Critical response ===
Malathi Rangarajan of The Hindu opined that "The concept is Utopian and the sequences almost implausible, but A. R. Murugadas sends a ray of hope for society's honest lot, through his 'Ramana'". A critic from Sify wrote that "Vijaykanth's Ramanaa is an engrossing crime drama which overflows with sharp dialogues against the corrupt system and is shot stylishly by director A.R. Murugadoss". Malini Mannath of Chennai Online said that "'Ramana' is a watch 'able' film despite its flaws". Cinesouth wrote "When the younger actors are busy taking a walk in the gardens of romance, the older heroes don't seem to tire of doing roles of the 'Gentleman', 'Indian' and 'Citizen' kind. Nobody knows why. 'Ramana' almost belongs to the same species too. Two things set this film apart from the rest- director Murugasdas' excellent screenplay and the very unusual climax. These are the factors that make this film acceptable".

=== Box office ===
The film was a critical and commercial success.

== Legacy ==
It served as a trendsetter in later years. The film has a strong cult following till date. Vijayakanth was featured as Professor Ramanaa using AI in a special appearance in the film Padai Thalaivan (2025) featuring his son Shanmuga Pandian in the lead role.

== Remakes ==
Year	Title	Language	Notes	Ref.
2003	Tagore	Telugu	It was made with several changes for different scenes, the flashback episode, and the climax.	
2005	Vishnu Sena	Kannada	The climax was borrowed from the Telugu version.	
2015	Gabbar Is Back	Hindi	The film was a little modernized compared to the original and its other remakes, and the climax was borrowed from the 2002 original Tamil version with some changes with an additional fight scene in it, even the abduction of the antagonist was borrowed from the Telugu version.	
2015	Warning	Bengali (Bangladesh)	The film had a different flashback and screenplay as compared to other remakes and the original.	
