= Vijay Award for Entertainer of the Year =

Indian film award

The Vijay Award for Entertainer of the Year is given by STAR Vijay as part of its annual Vijay Awards ceremony for Tamil (Kollywood) films. Vijay and Dhanush have won the award most number of times (3 times each).

== The list ==
Here is a list of the award winners and the films for which they won.

Year	Actor	Film	Link
2017	Dhanush	Velaiilla Pattadhari 2	
2014	Vijay	Jilla / Kaththi	
2013	Sivakarthikeyan	Kedi Billa Killadi Ranga / Ethir Neechal / Varuthapadatha Valibar Sangam	
2012	Vijay	Nanban / Thuppakki	
2011	Dhanush	Aadukalam / Mayakkam Enna	
2010	Suriya	Singam	
2009	Suriya	Ayan / Aadhavan	
2008	Dhanush	Yaaradi Nee Mohini	
2007	Vijay	Pokkiri / Azhagiya Tamil Magan	

== See also ==
- Tamil cinema
- Cinema of India
