= Balasubramaniem =

Indian cinematographer

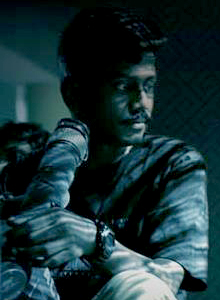
- Born: K. T. Balasubramaniem; 18 August 1966 (age 59); Karaikudi, Tamil Nadu, India
- Occupation: Cinematographer
- Years active: 1992–present
- Spouse: E.Mala
- Children: 2 (Kavin, Karun)

K. T. Balasubramaniem (born 18 August 1966) is an Indian cinematographer. Under the tutelage of P. C. Sreeram for nearly 5 years, he worked in award-winning films such as Thevar Magan, Thiruda Thiruda and Kuruthipunal.

== Career ==
His debut film was Iraniyan, a historical film set in the Pre-Independence era. Later, he worked in director Bala's film Pithamagan and 180.

Balasubramaniem started his career by assisting noted-cinematographer, P. C. Sreeram, for nearly 5 years, in award-winning films like Thevar Magan (1992), Thiruda Thiruda (1993), and Kuruthipunal (1995).

== Filmography ==
- Note: all films are in Tamil, unless otherwise noted.

Year	Title	Notes
1997	Ladies Only	Unreleased Hindi film
1999	Iraniyan	
2000	Yuvakudu	Telugu film
2002	Unnai Ninaithu	
2003	Vaseegara	
2003	Pithamagan	
2003	Inidhu Inidhu Kadhal Inidhu	
2004	M. Kumaran S/O Mahalakshmi	
2005	Majaa	
2006	Thambi	
2006	Sainikudu	Telugu film
2007	Azhagiya Tamil Magan	
2008	Kannum Kannum	
2008	Jayamkondaan	
2009	Ninaithale Inikkum	
2010	Kutty	
2010	Uthamaputhiran	
2011	180; Nootrenbadhu	Bilingual film Tamil Nadu State Film Award for Best Cinematographer
2011	Singam Puli	
2012	Oru Kal Oru Kannadi	
2012	Neerparavai	Nominated—SIIMA Award for Best Cinematographer
2013	Kanna Laddu Thinna Aasaiya	
2013	Varuthapadatha Valibar Sangam	
2014	Idhu Kathirvelan Kadhal	
2014	Nanbenda	
2015	Pasanga 2	
2016	Rajini Murugan	
2016	Kathakali	
2016	Idhu Namma Aalu	
2017	Podhuvaga En Manasu Thangam	
2018	Seemaraja	
2019	Bodha Yeri Budhi Maari	
2021	Chakra	
2021	Kasada Tabara	Streaming release; Segment: Arampatra
2022	Anbulla Ghilli	
2022	Laththi	
2023	The Great Indian Kitchen	
2025	Kombuseevi	
