= Sivakarthikeyan =

Indian actor and musician (born 1985)

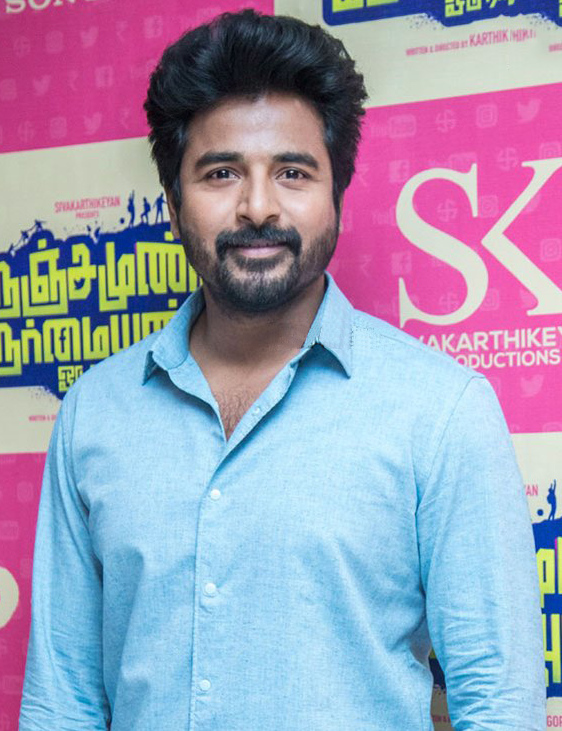
- Sivakarthikeyan in 2021
- Born: 17 February 1985 (age 41); Piranmalai, Sivagangai, Tamil Nadu, India
- Occupations: Actor; playback singer; lyricist; film producer; television presenter
- Years active: 2006–present
- Spouse: Aarthi (m. 2010)
- Children: 3
- Honours: Kalaimamani (2020)

Sivakarthikeyan (born 17 February 1985), also known by his initials as SK, is an Indian actor, playback singer, lyricist, and film producer primarily active in Tamil cinema. He served as a television presenter before his entry into films. He is a recipient of one Filmfare Award, two Tamil Nadu State Film Awards and eight SIIMA Awards.

Sivakarthikeyan gained attention after winning the stand-up comedy show Kalakka Povathu Yaaru? in 2006 and began hosting various shows on Star Vijay. His Tamil film breakthrough came with the 2012 comedy drama Marina. Later, he went on to star in commercially and critically successful films such as Ethir Neechal (2013), Varuthapadatha Valibar Sangam (2013), Namma Veettu Pillai (2019) and Amaran (2024), the latter becoming one of the top‑grossing Tamil films of that year. He launched his own production company, Sivakarthikeyan Productions, and produced various films including Kanaa (2018).

He received the Kalaimamani award from the Government of Tamil Nadu in 2020.

== Early life and family ==
Sivakarthikeyan was born on 17 February 1985 in Piranmalai near Singampunari in Sivagangai district in a Tamil family. His father G. Doss was a jail superintendent. He has an elder sister, who is a doctor. He completed schooling at Campion Anglo-Indian Higher Secondary School in Tiruchirappalli and earned a Bachelor’s degree from JJ College of Engineering. He married Aarthi on 27 August 2010. The couple have three children, one daughter and two sons. His cousin is Arun Prabu, with whom he collaborated on Vaazhl (2021).

== Career ==
=== 2006–2012: Early career and introduction to cinema ===
Sivakarthikeyan took part in various cultural events and performed mimicry and standup comedy during his college years. He took a three month-break in between studies, to take part in the auditions of Kalakka Povathu Yaaru?, a comedy reality TV show airing on Star Vijay, and won the second season of the competition in 2006. The makers of Aegan (2008) noticed his performance and offered him a supporting role in the film, but his portions did not make the final cut. He appeared in short films such as Mugaputhagam.

Director Pandiraj approached Sivakarthikeyan to play the lead role in his film Marina (2012), and he signed the project. He prepared for the role by visiting Marina Beach extensively to study the surroundings, while revealing that he hoped that his natural talent of humor would come through onscreen. Featuring alongside Oviya as a young couple in the film, Sivakarthikeyan's performance was well-received, with a critic noting "the romance adds colour to a monochrome film", while the reviewer also noted that the "role of Senthilnathan requires Siva to be just himself, it is just a cake walk in terms of performance for this actor."

Aishwarya Rajinikanth signed up Sivakarthikeyan to play a supporting role as Dhanush's friend in 3, after being impressed with his work onstage as a host. Though the film opened to mixed reviews, critics appreciated Sivakarthikeyan's work as providing comic relief in a serious film. He was next seen in Ezhil's romantic comedy Manam Kothi Paravai that released later that year. It opened to mixed reviews with a critic noting that the film "might not provide Sivakarthikeyan the platform he is aspiring for – lead roles in movies. But it does showcase his potential as an actor."

=== 2013–2019: Experimentation in genres and success ===
In 2013, Sivakarthikeyan appeared in three films. In his first release of the year, Kedi Billa Killadi Ranga, a dual hero coming-of-age comedy film, Sivakarthikeyan partnered once again with Pandiraj and acted alongside Vimal. The film opened to positive reviews from critics, and became a success at the box office. His next film was Dhanush's debut production venture Ethir Neechal, written and directed by R. S. Durai Senthilkumar, a former assistant of director Vetrimaaran. His third release of the year was director Ponram's comedy Varuthapadatha Valibar Sangam, which saw Sivakarthikeyan portray a carefree rural youth and he was paired with newcomer Sri Divya, and Soori. He won positive reviews for his performance from critics, with Sify noting "Sivakarthikeyan is terrific as Bosepandi because he makes it look so believable on screen with his body language, eyes and dialogue delivery". Another reviewer called him a delight to watch and claimed that he carried the script. The film completed 100 days during its theatrical run and was Sivakarthikeyan's biggest commercial box office success at that time. His performances in 2013 led him to win the year's Vijay Award for Entertainer of the Year, an onstage moment which Sivakarthikeyan described as "memorable".

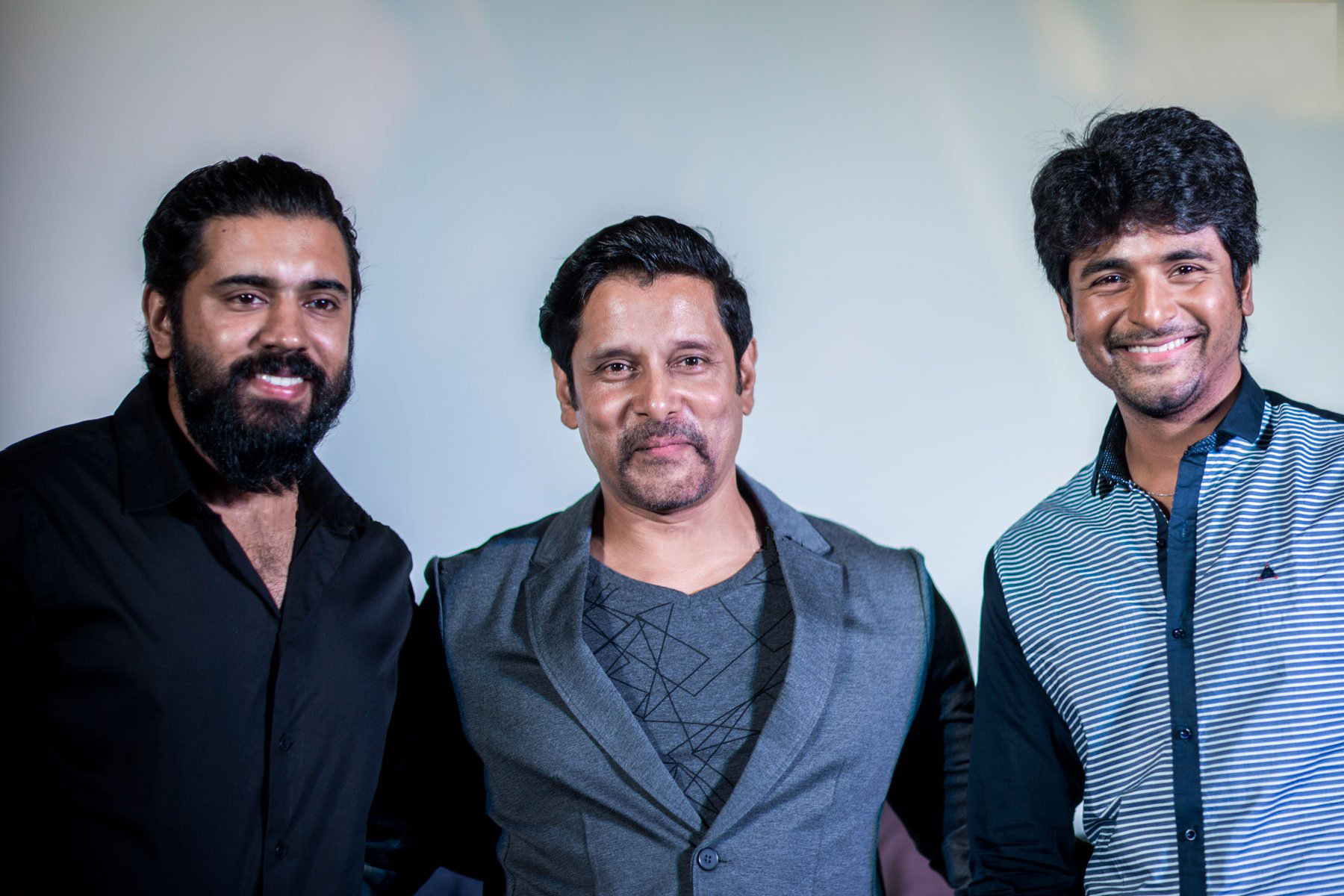
Sivakarthikeyan with Nivin Pauly and Vikram at Iru Mugan film audio launch event.

Sivakarthikeyan started the year 2014 with a comedy film Maan Karate produced by A. R. Murugadoss. In 2015, he paired up once again with Durai Senthilkumar for a police action film, Kaaki Sattai. The film released on 27 February 2015. It was a story about a sincere constable who takes risks to stop black market organ donation and with the aim of becoming an Inspector. He again joined hands with Ponram in the film Rajini Murugan, starring another newcomer Keerthy Suresh. The film's producer, N. Linguswamy, ultimately failed to provide Sivakarthikeyan with his salary due to losses incurred by the film's delayed release. His film Remo, directed by debutant Bakkiyaraj Kannan and produced by R. D. Raja, featured Sivakarthikeyan playing a lovestruck youth disguising himself as a female nurse to befriend his love interest. Sivakarthikeyan's next venture was director Mohan Raja's action-thriller, Velaikkaran, pairing with Nayanthara and featuring Fahadh Faasil as the main antagonist. The film, which revolves around an employee fighting against food adulteration in society, was released in 2017 to positive reviews from critics.

Sivakathikeyan then featured in the 2018 film Seemaraja, collaborating with director Ponram for the third time. The film, featuring an ensemble cast including Samantha Ruth Prabhu, Simran, Lal and Soori, released to mixed reviews. Later that year, he acted in the film, Kanaa, the directorial debut of Arunraja Kamaraj and the debut film of Sivakarthikeyan's production company Sivakarthikeyan Productions. The film features Sivakarthikeyan as a cricket coach, acting alongside Aishwarya Rajesh and Sathyaraj. The film was released to highly positive reviews. Sivakarthikeyan's first 2019 film was Mr. Local, starring opposite Nayanthara for the second time, which received poor reviews. His scenes from Kanaa were reused in the Telugu remake of the film titled Kousalya Krishnamurthy. In 2019, Sivakarthikeyan appeared in the family drama film Namma Veettu Pillai, and in a superhero film Hero.

=== 2021–present: Further success ===
Sivakarthikeyan's only 2021 film was Doctor, which received highly positive reviews from critics and audiences. It became the highest-grossing film of his career, with a global collection of ₹100 crore. His next release was Don, which released in 2022. Like Doctor, it received favorable reviews from both the critics and audience. In 2022, he began filming for Prince under the direction of K. V. Anudeep. At the same time, he also began shooting for Maaveeran, which was directed by Madonne Ashwin. Prince released in 2022 to negative reviews, but Maaveeran released in 2023 and was a commercial success. Soon after, on the occasion of Pongal, his long-delayed film Ayalaan was released in 2024 to generally positive reviews, especially with families. Clashing with his former co-star's film Captain Miller, the film grossed over ₹96 crores (US$12 million), emerging as a box office success, and becoming among the highest-grossing Indian films of 2024.

A month later, Sivakarthikeyan's film with Raaj Kamal Films International, directed by Rajkumar Periyasamy, was announced, previously under the tentative title SK21. On 16 February 2024, the title was revealed to be Amaran, as confirmed by a teaser trailer. The teaser garnered more than 2 million views within 6 hours. Amaran became a sleeper hit at the box office, emerged as the second highest-grossing Tamil film of 2024, garnering widespread critical acclaim for its engaging screenplay, based on the real-life incidents involving veteran Indian army officer Mukund Varadarajan. The film was his first major fully-fledged action entertainer.

His next release after Amaran was Madharaasi (2025), written and directed by A. R. Murugadoss, marking their second collaboration after Murugadoss produced Maan Karate (2014). The film, which had music composed by Anirudh Ravichander in his ninth collaboration with Sivakarthikeyan, saw him portray Raghu Ram, a patient with Fregoli delusion recruited to infiltrate an arms syndicate. Despite the film's mixed box office performance, Sivakarthikeyan was praised for his intense transformation and performance, particularly in action-heavy sequences. The following year, he starred in Sudha Kongara's political period drama Parasakthi (2026), his 25th film as a lead actor, set against the 1965 Anti-Hindi agitations. While the film received mixed reviews and underperformed commercially, critics commended Sivakarthikeyan's restrained and assured performance, with many calling it one of his finest works since Amaran. As of June 2026, Sivakarthikeyan is filming Seyon, a rural action drama produced by Raaj Kamal Films International, with music composed by Santhosh Narayanan. In September 2026, he joined the South Indian Film Writers Association for his numerous contributions as a lyricist.

== Controversies ==
In 2023, Tamil composer D. Imman publicly stated he would no longer collaborate with actor Sivakarthikeyan, noting that his betrayal significantly altered his life. Imman refrained from providing further details, citing the well-being of his children.

This announcement sparked speculation about Sivakarthikeyan's illegal affair with Imman’s ex-wife Monica Richard. However, she clarified that Sivakarthikeyan had only acted as a mediator during her divorce, seeking to keep the family united. She denied any inappropriate relationship and criticized the misinterpretation of Imman’s statements.

== Filmography ==
=== Films ===
Key
†	Denotes films that have not yet been released

=== As an actor ===
- All films are in Tamil unless otherwise noted.

List of Sivakarthikeyan film acting credits
Year	Title	Role	Notes	Ref.
2011	Mugaputhagam	Jeeva Murali	Short film	
2012	Marina	Senthilnathan		
2012	3	Kumaran		
2012	Manam Kothi Paravai	Kannan Ramaiah		
2013	Kedi Billa Killadi Ranga	Pattai Murugan / Ranga Murugan		
2013	Ethir Neechal	Kunjithapatham "Harish"		
2013	Varuthapadatha Valibar Sangam	Bose Pandi		
2014	Maan Karate	Thomas Peter / "Maan Karate" Peter		
2015	Kaaki Sattai	Madhimaran Ratnavel		
2015	Vajrakaya	Hanuman devotee	Kannada film; special appearance in the title song	
2016	Rajinimurugan	Rajinimurugan and Bose Pandi	Dual role	
2016	Remo	Siva Karthikeyan "SK" / Regina Motwani "Remo"		
2017	Velaikkaran	Arivazhagan "Arivu"		
2018	Seemaraja	Seemaraja and Kadambavel Raja	Dual role	
2018	Kanaa	Nelson Dilipkumar		
2019	Mr. Local	Manohar		
2019	Kousalya Krishnamurthy	Nelson Dilipkumar	Telugu film	
2019	Namma Veettu Pillai	Arumpon		
2019	Hero	Sakthivel / Mask		
2021	Doctor	Dr Varun		
2022	Don	Chakravarthi		
2022	Prince	Anbarasan		
2023	Maaveeran	Sathya		
2024	Ayalaan	Tamizh		
2024	The Greatest of All Time	Himself	Cameo appearance	
2024	Amaran	Major Mukund Varadarajan		
2025	Madharaasi	Raghu Ram		
2026	Parasakthi	Chezhiyan	25th film	
TBA	Seyon †	TBA	Filming	
TBA	SK27 †	TBA	Filming	

==== As a producer ====
List of Sivakarthikeyan film producer credits
Year	Title	Notes
2018	Kanaa	
2019	Nenjamundu Nermaiyundu Odu Raja	
2021	Vaazhl	
2021	Doctor	
2022	Don	
2024	Kurangu Pedal	
2024	Kottukkaali	
2025	House Mates	Presenter
2026	Thaai Kizhavi	Presenter

==== As dubbing artist ====
List of Sivakarthikeyan film dubbing credits
Year	Title	Actor	Notes
2009	Siva Manasula Sakthi	Voice Over	He dubbed a short voice segment imitating Rajinikanth in the song "Oru Adangapidari"
2012	Sridhar	Siddharth	Tamil dubbed version

== Television ==
List of Sivakarthikeyan television credits
Year	Series	Role	Channel	Notes
2006	Kalakka Povathu Yaaru? Season 2	Contestant	Star Vijay	Winner
2008	Kalakkal Champions	Contestant	Star Vijay	
2008	Jodi Number One Season 3	Contestant	Star Vijay	Runner-up
2008	Kana Kaanum Kaalangal	Himself	Star Vijay	Special appearance
2008	Kodambakkam Skool	Billa	Star Vijay	
2009	Boys vs Girls Season 1	Contestant	Star Vijay	
2009	Kana Kaanum Kaalangal	Himself	Star Vijay	Special appearance
2009	Adhu Idhu Edhu	Host	Star Vijay	
2009	Super Singer Junior	Host	Star Vijay	
2009	Boys vs Girls Season 2	Host / Contestant	Star Vijay	
2010	Jodi Number One Season 5	Host	Star Vijay	
2010	Airtel Super Singer Season 3	Host	Star Vijay	
2010	Jodi Number One Junior	Host	Star Vijay	
2011	5th Annual Vijay Awards	Host	Star Vijay	
2011	Kings of Comedy Season 1	Host	Star Vijay	
2012	6th Annual Vijay Awards	Host	Star Vijay	
2024	Bigg Boss Season 8	Himself	Star Vijay	Day 19 - Special appearance for Amaran Film promotions

== Discography ==
=== As playback singer ===
List of Sivakarthikeyan film playback singing credits
Year	Film	Song	Composer	Notes
2013	Varuthapadatha Valibar Sangam	"Varuthapadatha Valibar Sangam"	D. Imman	
2014	Maan Karate	"Royapuram Peter"	Anirudh Ravichander	
2015	Kaaki Sattai	"I'm So Cool"	Anirudh Ravichander	
2015	Mapla Singam	"Edhukku Machchan"	N. R. Raghunanthan	Movie Version Only
2016	Rajini Murugan	"Rajini Murugan"	D. Imman	
2018	Kanaa	"Vaayadi Petha Pulla"	Dhibu Ninan Thomas	
2019	Mr. Local	"Kalakkalu Mr. Localu"	Hiphop Tamizha	
2019	Thumbaa	"Humpty Dumpty"	Santhosh Dhayanidhi	
2019	Sixer	"Engavena Kochikinu Po"	Ghibran	
2021	Lift	"Inna Myluu"	Britto Michael	
2023	Maaveeran	"Vannarapettayila"	Bharath Sankar	
2025	Oh God Beautiful	"Venum Macha Peace"	JC Joe	
2026	Parasakthi	"Tharakku Tharakku"	G. V. Prakash Kumar	
2026	Thaai Kizhavi	"Thaai Kizhavi Vaaraa"	Nivas K. Prasanna	

=== As lyricist ===
List of Sivakarthikeyan film credits as a lyricist
Year	Film	Song	Composer	Notes
2018	Kolamaavu Kokila	"Kalyana Vayasu"	Anirudh Ravichander	
2019	Gurkha	"Hey Poya"	Raj Aryan	
2019	Namma Veettu Pillai	"Gaandha Kannazhagi"	D. Imman	
2019	Adithya Varma	"Idhu Enna Maayamo"	Radhan	
2021	Doctor	"Chellamma"	Anirudh Ravichander	
2021	Doctor	"So Baby"	Anirudh Ravichander	
2021	Naai Sekar	"Edakku Modakku"	Anirudh Ravichander	
2022	Etharkkum Thunindhavan	"Summa Surrunu"	D. Imman	
2022	Beast	"Arabic Kuthu"	Anirudh Ravichander	
2022	Don	"Private Party"	Anirudh Ravichander	
2024	Ayalaan	"Maanja Nee"	A. R. Rahman	
2026	Indie Song	"Velum Mayilum"	Nivas K. Prasanna	

== Awards and nominations ==
List of Sivakarthikeyan awards and nominations
Year	Award	Category	Work	Result	Ref.
2012	Tamil Nadu State Film Awards	Special Prize Award	Marina	Won	
2013	South Indian International Movie Awards	Best Male Debut – Tamil	Manam Kothi Paravai	Nominated	
2013	Vijay Awards	Best Debut Actor	Marina	Nominated	
2014	South Indian International Movie Awards	Best Actor – Tamil	Ethir Neechal	Won	
2014	South Indian International Movie Awards	Sensation of South Indian Cinema	—N/a	Won	
2014	Vijay Awards	Entertainer of the Year	Kedi Billa Killadi Ranga, Ethir Neechal, Varuthapadatha Valibar Sangam	Won	
2014	Vijay Television Awards	Pride of Vijay TV	—N/a	Won	
2017	IIFA Utsavam	Best Actor – Tamil	Rajinimurugan	Nominated	
2017	Edison Awards	Best Entertainer of the year	Remo	Won	
2017	South Indian International Movie Awards	Best Actor – Tamil	Remo	Won	
2018	Edison Awards	Best Actor	Velaikkaran	Nominated	
2018	Edison Awards	Favorite Actor	Velaikkaran	Won	
2018	South Indian International Movie Awards	Best Actor – Tamil	Velaikkaran	Won	
2019	Tamil Nadu State Film Awards	Tamil Nadu State Film Award for Best Film Portraying Woman in Good Light	Kanaa	Won	
2020	Ananda Vikatan Cinema Awards	Best Actor	Namma Veettu Pillai	Nominated	
2021	South Indian International Movie Awards	Best Actor – Tamil	Namma Veettu Pillai	Nominated	
2022	South Indian International Movie Awards	Best Actor – Tamil	Doctor	Won	
2023	Pinkvilla Style Icons Awards	Most Elegant Personality	—N/a	Won	
2023	Vikatan Awards	Best Entertainer	Doctor	Won	
2024	Filmfare Awards South	Best Actor – Tamil	Maaveeran	Nominated	
2024	South Indian International Movie Awards	Best Actor – Tamil	Maaveeran	Won	
2024	IIFA Utsavam	Best Actor – Tamil	Maaveeran	Nominated	
2025	Ananda Vikatan Cinema Awards	Best Production	Kottukkaali	Won	
2025	South Indian International Movie Awards	Best Actor – Tamil	Amaran	Won	
2026	Filmfare Awards	Best Actor – Tamil	Amaran	Won	
