= Seemaraja =

- Theatrical release poster
- Directed by: Ponram
- Written by: Ponram
- Produced by: R. D. Raja
- Starring: Sivakarthikeyan; Samantha Ruth Prabhu
- Cinematography: Balasubramaniem
- Edited by: Vivek Harshan
- Music by: D. Imman
- Production company: 24AM Studios
- Release date: 13 September 2018
- Running time: 158 minutes
- Country: India
- Language: Tamil

Seemaraja (transl. King of the district) is a 2018 Indian Tamil-language action comedy film written and directed by Ponram, produced by R. D. Raja under 24AM Studio. The film stars Sivakarthikeyan and Samantha, with Simran, Lal, Soori and Napoleon in supporting roles. The film features music composed by D. Imman and cinematography by Balasubramaniam. It was released on 13 September 2018, coinciding with the festival of Vinayagar Chathurthi.

== Plot ==
The plot follows Seema Raja, who is a king from Singampatti in Tirunelveli, hailing from a Zamindar family. His ancestor is a reputed legend named Kadambavel Raja. Seema Raja is often seen with his accountant friend, Kannaku.

One day, the principal from a nearby school invites Seema Raja’s dad, Ariya Raja, to an awards ceremony. As Ariya Raja is caught up with commitments, Seema Raja decides to attend in his place. There, he meets a sports teacher named Suthanthira Selvi, who is also a Silambattam expert. He falls head over heels for her the moment he sees her.

Seema Raja is at loggerheads with Kaaleeshwari and Kathaadi Kannan, the latter having once been a butcher who attained many acres of land to create wind farms. However, Kannan neglects the growth of agriculture, angering Seema Raja.

Kannan kidnaps Selvi and locks her up at his place. A flashback reveals that Selvi is actually Kannan’s daughter from his first marriage. Kannan ditched his first wife for Kaaleeshwari, and his ex-wife was so heartbroken she ended her life. Ariya Raja tries to stop Kannan’s seizing of land, but the despondent villagers mock his efforts. Heart-broken, Ariya Raja dies. Seema Raja grieves heavily at the loss of his father during his funeral. His grandfather consoles him by telling him the brave deeds that Kadambavel Raja achieved and his epic battles against invaders. Seema Raja is inspired to amend his mistakes after hearing his grandfather's stories.

Meanwhile, Selvi is forced to stay in captivity, as Kaaleshwari threatens to kill Selvi's sister if she tries to escape. When Seema Raja tries to get her out legally, she replies, "Ask my father" to every police question, and the case is promptly shut down. Later, Seema Raja deduces that Selvi was speaking in code. He talks to her foster father and learns that she loves him.

Seema Raja concocts a plan where he makes a deal with the Raj of Udaipur to set up wind farms while still allowing the villagers to farm and earn money from the land. The villagers are skeptical at first but eventually agree. Seema Raja goes to rescue Selvi, but Kannan and Kaaleeshwari chase them down, recapture her, and try to hang her from a wind turbine. Just in time, Seema Raja rescues her and in the ensuing fight, Kaaleeshwari gets crushed by the wind turbine and Kannan is defeated.

In the end, Seema Raja and Selvi live happily ever after.

== Cast ==
- Sivakarthikeyan in a dual role as
  - Seema Raja
  - Kadambavel Raja
- Samantha Ruth Prabhu as Suthanthira Selvi
- Soori as Andisamy (Kanakku / Accountant), Seema Raja's friend
- Simran as Kaaleeshwari
- Lal as Kaathadi Kannan
- Napoleon as Ariya Raja, Titular Raja of Singampatti (Seema Raja's father)
- Manobala as Headmaster
- Charandeep as Puliyampatti Tigers Wrestler
- Naadodigal Gopal as Selvi's adopted father/uncle
- Indhumathy Manikandan as Selvi's mother
- Sriranjani as Titular Rani
- Paunraj as Karikkada/Kaathadi Kannan's assistant
- Rishikanth as Kaaleeshwari's brother
- Aathma Patrick as Wrestler
- Vaishali Thaniga as Jamuna
- Surjith Ansary as Bridegroom
- NK Krishan as Krishan
- Prema Priya
- Devu Krishnan as Suthanthira Selvi's sister
- Supergood Subramani as Raja's assistant
- Keerthy Suresh as Bhoomi, Kadambavel Raja's wife (special appearance)
- Rajendran as Wrestling Coach (special appearance)
- Nawab Shah as Malik Kafur
- Swaminathan as Puli Murugan (special appearance)
- KPY Palani (special appearance as himself)
- Ponram (special appearance in the "Vaaren Vaaren Seemaraja")
- Balasubramaniem (special appearance in the "Vaaren Vaaren Seemaraja")
- Baba Bhaskar (special appearance in the "Vaaren Vaaren Seemaraja")
- Yogi Babu (special appearance in "Varum Aana Varaathu")

== Production ==
On 17 August 2016, R. D. Raja announced that he would produce a film directed by Ponram starring Sivakarthikeyan in the lead role, with the film marking the third collaboration of the pair after the successful ventures of Varuthapadatha Valibar Sangam (2013) and Rajini Murugan (2016). Raja announced that the film would begin in early 2017 and be released for the Diwali season of 2017. Samantha was signed on to star in the film as the lead actress and Soori was also confirmed to be a part of the cast during mid-August 2016. Music composer D. Imman, cinematographer Balasubramaniem and editor Vivek Harshan were also retained to be a part of the project from the director's previous films. Meanwhile, T. Muthuraj was signed as an art director for this film, replacing G. Durairaj who earlier works for Ponram's earlier films. For her role in the film, Samantha began learning the art of silambam in late 2016. However, production on the film was postponed to allow Sivakarthikeyan to finish his commitments for Raja's two other ongoing ventures, Remo (2016) and Velaikkaran (2017).

The film commenced with a launch event held on 16 June 2017, with Simran, Napoleon and Lal joining the cast. Simran was revealed to play a character with negative shades along with Lal, while Napoleon was signed to portray the father of Sivakarthikeyan. The first schedule started in Thenkasi on the following day, with scenes involving the lead cast shot. By late November 2017, the team revealed that "fifty five per cent" of the film's shoot was over, before starting the third schedule of the shoot. The film progressed untitled until February 2018 when the title of Seema Raja was announced to the public through a first look poster. In this film, actress Keerthy Suresh got the third chance to act with Sivakarthikeyan in a cameo role. Actor Soori is sporting a six pack for the film. This film shooting wrapped up on 19 June 2018.

== Release ==
The distribution rights for Seema Raja in Poland were acquired by 7th Sense Cinematics. The film released on 13 September 2018.

== Soundtrack ==
Seemaraja

Soundtrack album by D. Imman
- Released: 17 August 2018
- Recorded: 2018
- Genre: Film soundtrack
- Length: 51:12
- Label: Think Music
- Producer: D. Imman

D. Imman chronology
Kadaikutty Singam (2018)	Seemaraja (2018)	Viswasam (2019)

Singles from Seemaraja
- 1. "Vaaren Vaaren Seemaraja" Released: 25 July 2018

The music was composed by D. Imman. The first single was released on 25 July 2018. The audio launch was held on 17 August 2018, at Madurai, featuring the cast and crew and all other celebrities in attendance. After the audio release, 24AM Studios and Think Music India teamed up with Can-Lah Studio, to organise a Karaoke Booth, for the film's promotional purposes. The first Karaoke Booth event held on 25 August 2018, at Phoenix Marketcity, Velachery, Chennai and another Karaoke Booth held on 30 August 2018, at Madurai and Coimbatore respectively.

The soundtrack album features twelve songs composed by D. Imman, with four songs as Karaoke versions, and one instrumental version.

All lyrics are written by Yugabharathi.

Track listing
No.	Title	Singer(s)	Length
1.	"Vaaren Vaaren Seemaraja"	Diwakar, Kavitha Gopi	5:13
2.	"Onnavitta Yaarum Yenakilla (Version 1)"	Sean Roldan, Shreya Ghoshal	4:38
3.	"Varum Aana Varaathu"	D. Imman, Vandana Srinivasan	4:24
4.	"Paraak Paraak"	Senthil Ganesh	4:25
5.	"Machakkanni"	D. Imman	4:11
6.	"Onnavitta Yaarum Yenakilla (Version 2)"	Sathyaprakash Dharmar, Shreya Ghoshal	4:37
7.	"Seemaraja Swag"	Shenbagaraj, Vignesh Narayanan, Santosh Hariharan, Deepak, Swetha Suresh	1:30
8.	"A Late Night Walk with Veena"	Punya Srinivas	4:01
Total length:			32:59

== Box office ==
The film was Sivakarthikeyan's biggest opening and collected ₹22 crore (equivalent to ₹32 crore or US$3.4 million in 2026) at the opening weekend at the box office.

== Reception ==
=== Critical reception ===
Seemaraja received mostly mixed reviews from critics. Janani.K of Indiatoday wrote "Director Ponram's Seema Raja starring Sivakarthikeyan and Samantha is a pointless rural drama that has nothing new in it. It is a brainless mass film." Srinivasa Ramanujam of The Hindu says "Director Ponram seems to have clearly missed a trick by trying out to put in too many commercial elements and excelling in none." Priyanka Sundar of Hindustan Times wrote "This Sivakarthikeyan movie is a colourless comedy."
