= Madura Veeran =

- Theatrical release poster
- Directed by: P. G. Muthiah
- Written by: P. G. Muthiah
- Produced by: Viji Subramanian
- Starring: Shanmuga Pandian; Meenakshi
- Cinematography: P. G. Muthiah
- Edited by: Praveen K. L.
- Music by: Santhosh Dhayanidhi
- Production companies: V Studios; PG Media Works
- Release date: 2 February 2018
- Country: India
- Language: Tamil

Madura Veeran (transl. Warrior from Madurai) is a 2018 Indian Tamil-language action drama film written and directed by cinematographer P. G. Muthiah. Viji Subramaniam produced the film along with the director, under the banners of V Studios and PG Media Works. Shanmuga Pandian and Meenakshi play the lead roles, while Samuthirakani, Vela Ramamoorthy and Mime Gopi amongst others play supporting roles in the film. Santhosh Dhayanidhi was selected to compose the music for the film. The film's plot narrates the issues on jallikattu and the politics associated with, favouring the tradition rather than the proposed ban. The film released across Tamil Nadu on 2 February 2018 to mixed-to-positive reviews.

== Plot ==
Durai (Shanmuga Pandian) returns to his native in Madurai from Malaysia after 20 years in the pretext of marrying a girl from his village, but he has other plans in mind: to find out his father Rathnavelu's (Samuthirakani) murderer and to conduct the valorous sport of jallikattu, which has been stopped for many years. Slain Rathnam was a revered leader in the area who always strived to unite the two rival communities: the upper caste bull owner and bigwig Gurumurthy (Vela Ramamoorthy) and the lower caste headed by Malaisami (Mime Gopi). Then, there is Durai's uncle Pattaiyar (G. Marimuthu), whose daughter (Meenakshi) is fond of her ‘murai paiyan’. How Durai succeeds in his mission forms the rest with a mild twist revealed towards the end.

== Cast ==
- Shanmuga Pandian as Durai (Maduraiveeran)
- Meenakshi as Durai's cousin
- Samuthirakani as Rathnavelu
- Vela Ramamoorthy as Gurumoorthy
- Mime Gopi as Malaiswamy
- G. Marimuthu as Pattaiyar
- P. L. Thenappan as Perumal
- Rajendran
- Bala Saravanan as Kodhandam
- A. Vinod Bharathi as Gurumoorthy's brother
- Gajaraj as Collector
- Rajapandi as Mettuppatti Moorthy, Durai's friend
- Narendran Subramaniam (Shanmuga Pandian’s friend)
- Arandhai Rajagopal

== Production ==
Following the release of his debut film Sagaptham (2015), Shanmuga Pandian moved on to work on Thamizhan Endru Sol co-starring his father Vijayakanth in a pivotal role. However Vijayakanth's ill health meant that the project was postponed and Shanmuga Pandian moved on to work on Madura Veeran, which would mark the directorial debut of cinematographer and producer P. G. Muthiah. Muthiah revealed that he had written the script for the film in June 2016, based on jallikattu, much before the release of Hiphop Tamizha's popular video on jallikattu and also before the 2017 pro-jallikattu protests, and was glad that the events raised the profile of his script. He stated that following the protest, he tweaked the script and removed all explanations about the sport, because most people had become familiar with and grown to understand the terms used in jallikattu. As the film was set in Madurai, Muthiah wanted to cast someone from town — and Shanmuga Pandian fit the bill of a tall, young guy, who naturally has a Madurai slang. Meenakshi, a debutant actress from Kerala, was signed on for the leading female role.

The team began the shoot in April 2017 in Gerugambakkam in the outskirts of Chennai, with actors including Samuthirakani, Mime Gopi, Rajendran and Bala Saravanan joining the cast. Production continued in and around Madurai throughout the middle of 2017, and the shoot was finished by August 2017. The team began promotions in hope of releasing the film for 12 January 2018, to coincide with Thai Pongal and the jallikattu season across Tamil Nadu. However lack of screens as a result of the release of more high-profile films, meant that the makers chose to delay the film until February 2018.

== Soundtrack ==
Madura Veeran

Soundtrack album by Santhosh Dhayanidhi
- Released: Nov 17, 2015
- Recorded: 2018
- Genre: Soundtrack
- Length: 16:16
- Label: TrendMusic
- Producer: Santhosh Dhayanidhi

Santhosh Dhayanidhi chronology
Yatchan (2015)	Madura Veeran (2015)	Lisaa (2018)

The film's music was composed by Santhosh Dhayanidhi, and the soundtrack was released on 18 November 2017 through TrendMusic. As it was Santhosh's first rural album, he used village-based sounds entirely, to make the music feel "raw and earthy" by choosing acoustic instruments and avoiding synthesizers. He also utilised folk singers, rather than trained professionals, for a song on the Karuppusaamy deity and for a politically charged song. All Lyrics were Penned by Yugabharathi.

Track listing
No.	Title	Singer(s)	Length
1.	"Kaappaathu Karuppa"	Mathichiyam Bala, Kottai Samy	3:51
2.	"Enna Nadakkudhu Naattula"	Jaya Moorthy	4:10
3.	"Un Nenjukulle"	Chinmayi	3:55
4.	"Kombula Kombula"	Mahalingam	4:20
Total length:			16:16

== Release ==
Tamil Nadu theatrical rights of the film were valued at ₹2.5 crore.

== Critical reception ==
V. Lakshmi of The Times of India rated the film 3/5 stars and wrote, "After cranking the camera for films like Poo, Kandein Kadhalai and Saguni, PG Muthiah has also wielded the megaphone for this rural entertainer, and he has done a fairly good job for a debutant director. In just over two hours (the editing is by KL Praveen), he has managed to narrate the story without extra frills." Arunkumar Shekhar of The New Indian Express wrote, "The first half seems hurried, while the second is more languid and almost threatens to derail the first half’s effort. [...] All in all, it’s a really good directorial debut that achieves a balance with its intent to deal with both caste and Tamil pride."

Karthik Kumar of Hindustan Times rated the film 2.5/5 and wrote, "Madura Veeran shines in parts, but the sum of the parts isn’t effective enough to make us praise the overall intent." Anupama Subramanian of Deccan Chronicle wrote, "A major plus is that Muthaiah has projected the scenario in a realistic manner sans commercial trappings. Also, the Jallikattu sequences and the politics behind the sport have been captured earnestly. [...] It is an honest attempt that can be enjoyed in parts."
