= Varuthapadatha Valibar Sangam =

2013 Indian film by Ponram

- Theatrical release poster
- Directed by: Ponram
- Written by: Ponram
- Dialogue by: M. Rajesh
- Produced by: P. Madan
- Starring: Sivakarthikeyan; Soori; Sri Divya; Sathyaraj
- Cinematography: Balasubramaniem
- Edited by: Vivek Harshan
- Music by: D. Imman
- Production company: Escape Artists Motion Pictures
- Release date: 6 September 2013
- Running time: 157 minutes
- Country: India
- Language: Tamil
- Budget: ₹7 crore

Varuthapadatha Valibar Sangam (transl. The Association of Carefree Youths), also known by the initialism VVS, is a 2013 Indian Tamil-language romantic comedy and political satire film directed by Ponram. Produced by P. Madan under Escape Artists Motion Pictures, it stars Sivakarthikeyan, Soori and Sri Divya (in her Tamil debut), with Sathyaraj in a prominent role. In the film, a young man falls in love with the daughter of the village head, who opposes love marriages.

Varuthapadatha Valibar Singam marked Ponram's return to direction after Thirutham (2007). Filming, which took place in Theni, Tiruchirappalli and Chennai, was completed by July 2013. The music was composed by D. Imman, with cinematography handled by Balasubramaniem and editing done by Vivek Harshan. M. Rajesh, under whom Ponram had previously worked as an assistant director, wrote the dialogues.

Varuthapadatha Valibar Singam was released on 6 September 2013, coinciding with the Ganesh Chathurthi weekend and became a major commercial success, positioning Sivakarthikeyan as a star in Tamil cinema. The film received praise for the on-screen chemistry between Sivakarthikeyan and Soori, and Soori's dialogues became popular. It was remade in Kannada as Adyaksha and in Telugu as Current Theega, both released in 2014.

== Plot ==
Police arrive at the house of Sivanandi, a strict village head and the wealthiest man in the area. They question him about the supposed murders of his youngest daughter Lathapandi and her lover Bosepandi, who had eloped. Rumours say Sivanandi killed them to protect family honour. He calmly admits it and offers to take the police to the "crime scene".

Prior to this, Bosepandi and his best friend Kodi lead a gang of idle, mischievous young men called the Varuthapadatha Valibar Sangam ("Association of Carefree Youths"). They spend their days hanging out, pulling pranks, and clashing with village elders. Bosepandi develops a crush on Kalyani, a schoolteacher. Too shy or theatrical to approach her directly, he writes a love letter and enlists Lathapandi, a Class 12 student at the same school and Sivanandi's youngest daughter, to deliver it. Lathapandi does so while playfully misleading and teasing Bosepandi along the way.

Meanwhile, Sivanandi arranges a marriage for Lathapandi. She is underage and wants to continue her studies, so she resists. The wedding is publicly announced on a billboard. Bosepandi and Kodi, partly to promote their own association and partly out of principle against the underage marriage, intervene; they go to the police, threaten to escalate the matter higher if needed, and successfully pressure the authorities to stop the wedding.

Kalyani later marries someone else, leaving Bosepandi briefly heartbroken. He tries to move on by organising a local event. On the night of that event he sees Lathapandi dressed in a sari and falls in love with her. That same night the police inform Sivanandi that Bosepandi was the one who stopped Lathapandi's earlier marriage, escalating the rivalry.

The next day Bosepandi proposes to Lathapandi and she rejects him. As he walks away, Sivanandi's men thrash him. In retaliation, Bosepandi and Kodi steal Sivanandi's prized gun and use the theft as leverage. Bosepandi secretly returns the gun after extracting a promise that Lathapandi will attend a friend's wedding; she does, and they take photos together, deepening their connection. Lathapandi's mother tells her to avoid Bosepandi.

Later, one of Sivanandi's cows falls into a well while he is away. Bosepandi helps rescue it, softening things. That night Bosepandi stays at Lathapandi's house and they observe Sivanandi sleepwalking. The next morning, still believing Sivanandi is sleepwalking, Bosepandi confesses his love for Lathapandi. When he realises Sivanandi is awake and has heard everything, Bosepandi flees.

Sivanandi forces Lathapandi to promise she will marry only the groom he chooses. A new match is arranged. On the night before the wedding, Lathapandi elopes with Bosepandi. Sivanandi intercepts them. He urges them to flee, gives them money, and tells them never to return—because he himself dislikes the chosen groom but cannot openly cancel the marriage without damaging his standing and "honour" in the village. He watches them marry. He then kills a goat, stains his shirt with its blood, and returns home claiming the blood is his daughter's and that he killed the eloping couple to protect family honour. The police accept the story.

The couple settle in a quiet hilly area. Sivanandi secretly visits them regularly. Bosepandi later tells him that Lathapandi is pregnant. Eventually Bosepandi's father finds them and offers more money than Sivanandi had given, encouraging them to return. The couple return to the village. The families reconcile, and everyone lives happily together.

== Cast ==
- Sivakarthikeyan as Bosepandi M.A M.Phil.
- Sathyaraj as Sivanandi
- Soori as Kodi
- Sri Divya as Lathapandi (Voice dubbed by R Karuna Visalini)
- Bindu Madhavi as Kalyani (special appearance)
- Kadhal Dhandapani as Rasu
- Subramaniyapuram Raja as Veeranan
- Naadodigal Gopal as Perumal
- Hello Kandasamy as Dharmar
- Soundararaja as Pulichathanni
- Sriranjani as Dhanalakshmi
- Vinodhini Vaidyanathan as Inspector Bharathi
- Shaalu Shammu as Namitha
- Rajendran as Koormayi
- Joe Malloori as Police Inspector
- Elango Kumaravel as a Police constable
- Yaar Kannan as Bosepandi's father
- Swaminathan as Lawyer Veerasamy
- Thavasi as Kodi's father

== Production ==
=== Development ===
Ponram returned to direction with this film after Thirutham (2007), and M. Rajesh, under whom he was previously worked as assistant director, wrote the dialogues. The title Varuthapadatha Valibar Sangam was derived from a fictional club that features in Winner (2003), and a real club with the same name which Ponram said "treats serious issues with disdain and frivolous issues seriously". The film was produced by P. Madan under Escape Artists Motion Pictures, photographed by Balasubramaniem and edited by Vivek Harshan. It was announced at a press interaction event on 12 June 2013 at Chennai.

Rajesh initially wrote one version of the script, which Ponram had drafted and then had changed the normal version of the dialogues to suit its village-centric theme. While writing the story, he would often provide feedback from Rajesh suggesting any changes in the script. Since Rajesh knew about the progress of the script from its inception, Ponram insisted him to write the dialogues, to which Rajesh agreed. He considered the humour element to be the highlight for this film.

=== Casting and filming ===
Ponram narrated the script to at least 12 actors before Sivakarthikeyan was finalised as the lead character; Shakthi Vasudevan was one of the actors previously considered. Soori was chosen to play a comedic role; he previously worked with Sivakarthikeyan in Manam Kothi Paravai (2012) and Kedi Billa Killadi Ranga (2013). Sri Divya, who previously appeared mainly in Telugu films, made her Tamil debut in this film; she plays Sivakarthikeyan's love interest. Sathyaraj was chosen to play Sivanandi; Ponram considered him to be perfect for the role and added that his role was not an antagonist.

Much of the film's production had been completed before the team officially announced the film; filming was held in various places such as Theni, Tiruchirappalli and Chennai. The final filming schedule was completed in Theni by early July 2013. Ponram noted that he initially wanted the climax to depict the realities of honour killing, but when he decided to approach Sivakarthikeyan, changed the climax as he felt it would not suit the actor's image.

== Themes ==
Varuthapadatha Valibar Singam deals with the practice of honour killing. Surendhar MK of Firstpost noted that though films with this theme are often considered "preachy" and "gory", Ponram took a light-hearted and comical route for this film. Ponram told him, "Though I tried to put forth the social injustices prevailing in a particular caste or region, I never wanted to use any direct caste references". Instead, he implied it using their customs, traditions and accents to pertain to wide range of audiences. Sivakarthikeyan described it as a political satire.

== Soundtrack ==
The music is composed by D. Imman, with lyrics written by Yugabharathi. Imman collaborated with Sivakarthikeyan for the second time after Manam Kothi Paravai. The soundtrack album features five songs, with a dubstep version and three karaoke versions, thus making it to nine tracks in total. Sivakarthikeyan sung the title track "Varuthapadatha Valibar Sangam", making his debut in playback singing. The audio launch took place on 19 July 2013 at Sathyam Cinemas, Chennai.

== Release ==
Initially scheduled to be released during August 2013, Varuthapadatha Valibar Sangam was released in theatres on 6 September 2013, during the Vinayagar Chathurthi weekend. It was released in 343 screens in Tamil Nadu. The film's television premiere took place on 14 January 2014, coinciding with the Pongal festival on Kalaignar TV, and registered a TRP rating of 12.29.

== Reception ==
=== Critical reception ===
Baradwaj Rangan wrote for The Hindu, "The film has enough silliness to qualify as mild amusement, especially in the scenes with Bosepandi and his friend Kodi (Soori) — but these gags would work just as well as a compilation clip on YouTube. The plotting is too loose to warrant a two-hour-and-forty-minute movie, with sentimental detours and meandering subplots". The Times of India rated it 3 out of 5, stating "What makes this a rather predictable film appealing to an extent is the lighthearted manner in which Ponram tells his story." IANS wrote, "While the film's biggest strength are its dialogues, its lengthy second half tests the audience's patience".

S Saraswathi of Rediff.com gave a rating of 2 out of 5 and summarised, "Varuthapadatha Valibar Sangam is boring and gets repetitive after a while". Sify gave a rating of 2.75 out of 5 stating, "Ponram through VVS follows the comedy template set by his guru Rajesh and blends them with his hero Sivakarthikeyan's image. Add D Imman's peppy melodies with a rural touch and you get a mass comedy entertainer". Malini Mannath of The New Indian Express wrote that the first half was "interesting" but the pace "slackens" in the latter half with "some dull patches and too many songs", although she praised the "surprise fun-ending". Malini criticised the film's length and wrote, "the narration could have been tightened and made crisper [...] the film though not the best of comedies, makes for a fairly pleasant watch".

=== Box office ===
Varuthapadatha Valibar Sangam opened at number one at the Chennai box office, and remained so for three weeks. It grossed over ₹3 crore (equivalent to ₹5.6 crore or US$580,000 in 2026) on the opening day. Trade analyst Sreedhar Pillai noted that the opening was the biggest in Sivakarthikeyan's career at the time of its release. In an article dated 25 September 2013, Sreedhar Pillai wrote that the film, made on a production budget of ₹7 crore (equivalent to ₹13 crore or US$1.3 million in 2026), collected ₹10.25 crore (equivalent to ₹19 crore or US$2.0 million in 2026) in its first three days, and ₹27.35 crore (equivalent to ₹51 crore or US$5.3 million in 2026) after 17 days at the Tamil Nadu box office. He considered it "2013's biggest hit" to that point, based on return on investment (ROI) alone. That December, another trade analyst Trinath told IANS that the film earned ₹23 crore (equivalent to ₹43 crore or US$4.4 million in 2026), and concurred that it was "undoubtedly the biggest Tamil hit of the year" with regards to ROI.

== Accolades ==
Event	Category	Nominee(s)	Result	Ref.
61st Filmfare Awards South	Best Music Director – Tamil	D. Imman	Nominated	
3rd South Indian International Movie Awards	Best Debut Actress	Sri Divya	Won	
3rd South Indian International Movie Awards	Best Actor in a Supporting Role	Sathyaraj	Nominated	
3rd South Indian International Movie Awards	Best Comedian	Soori	Won	
3rd South Indian International Movie Awards	Best Music Director	D. Imman	Nominated	
3rd South Indian International Movie Awards	Best Male Playback Singer	Hariharasudan (for "Oodha Color Ribbon")	Nominated	
3rd South Indian International Movie Awards	Best Dance Choreographer	Dinesh (for "Oodha Color Ribbon")	Nominated	
8th Vijay Awards	Best Comedian	Soori	Nominated	
8th Vijay Awards	Best Debut Actress	Sri Divya	Nominated	
8th Vijay Awards	Best Music Director	D. Imman	Nominated	
8th Vijay Awards	Entertainer of the Year	Sivakarthikeyan	Won	
8th Vijay Awards	Favourite Film	Varuthapadatha Valibar Sangam	Nominated	
8th Vijay Awards	Favourite Song	"Oodha Colour Ribbon"	Won	

In addition to these awards, the film won the Shri B Nagi Reddi Best Wholesome Entertainment Tamil Film Award.

== Remakes ==
The film was remade in Kannada as Adyaksha in 2014, and the same year in Telugu as Current Theega. A Tulu remake titled Jai Maruthi Yuvaka Mandala was completed by 2019 but remains unreleased.

== Legacy ==
Varuthapadatha Valibar Sangam catapulted Sivakarthikeyan to stardom and made him a bankable star in Tamil cinema. Despite his and Soori's previous collaborations in Manam Kothi Paravai and Kedi Billa Killadi Ranga, this film garnered significant attention for their on-screen chemistry with the punchlines by Soori becoming popular. Soori noted that his chemistry with the actor was similar to that of Sathyaraj and Goundamani. The film's success led Sivakarthikeyan and Soori to collaborate with Ponram for two other films: Rajinimurugan (2016) and Seemaraja (2018). In late 2013, a Tiruppur-based minor stopped her wedding in a manner that the media noted was similar to Varuthapadatha Valibar Sangam, which the girl had watched. Sivakarthikeyan commented, "I am happy that my film has influenced people's life in a great way" and called child marriages illegal.

== In other media ==
A comic book adaptation of Varuthapadatha Valibar Sangam was published by Naveena Publications in August 2018. Ponram worked with the storyboard team of Seemaraja for around six months to complete all of the artwork. In a scene from the Tamil film Maan Karate (2014) also starring Sivakarthikeyan, Yogi Babu teases him by singing "Oodha Colour Ribbon". In Rajinimurugan, Sivakarthikeyan, besides playing the title character, reprised his role of Bosepandi for a cameo.

== Potential sequel ==
Ponram initially discussed regarding plans for a sequel in late 2021. During the promotions of his directorial Kombuseevi (2025), he stated that the sequel was still in development stage.
