= Sagaptham =

2015 Indian film by Surendran

- Poster
- Directed by: Surendran
- Written by: Velumani (dialogues)
- Story by: Naveen Krishna
- Produced by: L. K. Sudhish
- Starring: Shanmuga Pandian; Neha Hinge
- Cinematography: S. K. Bhupathi
- Edited by: S. P. Ahmed
- Music by: Karthik Raja
- Production company: Captain Cine Creations
- Release date: 2 April 2015
- Running time: 147 minutes
- Country: India
- Language: Tamil

Sagaptham (transl. Era) is a 2015 Indian Tamil-language action comedy film directed by Surendran and produced by L. K. Sudhish. The film stars newcomer Shanmuga Pandian, with Neha Hinge and Shubra Aiyappa. The soundtrack was composed by Karthik Raja. Naveen Krishna and Velumani wrote the story and dialogues respectively. The cinematography was performed by S. K. Bhupathi and S. P. Ahmed worked as an editor. This is last film of Vijayakanth who made his cameo appearance in the film before his death in 2023.

== Plot ==
The film shows a village youth who travels to Malaysia to find work. In a turn of events, he becomes a detective there and tracks down a gang that produces illegal medicines.

== Cast ==
- Shanmuga Pandian as Saga
- Neha Hinge as Neha
- Suresh as Doctor
- Shubra Aiyappa as Priya
- Ranjith as Chinrasu
- Devayani as Lakshmi
- Jagan as Maruthu, Saga's friend
- Rajendranath as Saga's father
- Powerstar Srinivasan as R. Manmadhan, Saga's uncle
- Singampuli as Tiger
- Shanmugarajan as Neha's father
- Rekha Suresh as Neha's mother
- Thalaivasal Vijay as Dinesh
- Bose Venkat as Cruel Moneylender
- Prema Priya as Guruvamma
- Saurav Chakrabarti
- Muthukaalai
- Vijayakanth as Indian Embassy Officer Deiveegam (guest appearance)

== Production ==
In June 2011, actor Vijayakanth revealed that his youngest son Shanmugapandian would be introduced as an actor in the Tamil film industry and began looking for apt scripts for his debut venture. Shanmugapandian, then a Visual Communications student at Loyola College, Chennai, began taking dance lessons and martial arts practice, to get into better physical shape before his first film. Vijayakanth initially considered remaking the Telugu film, Brindavanam (2010) as well other projects directed by K. S. Ravikumar and Hari, but later opted for an original script written by Naveen, with dialogues by Velumani. By the end of 2012, it was finalised that Vijayakanth's brother-in-law L. K. Sudhish would be the film's producer and newcomer Santhoshkumar Rajan, would be director. The film was launched on 12 December 2013 at Aandal Azhagar Illam in Saligramam, Chennai with several of Vijayakanth's contemporaries in attendance. Early reports speculated that actor Vijay and Vijayakanth himself, would play guest roles, but speculation was denied.

The film began its first schedule in and around Pollachi, Azhiyar Dam, Valparai and Anaimalai for close to a month. The second schedule of the film's shoot was held in Kumbakonam for three weeks during when a song involving 1000 junior artistes and 200 dancers was shot for 6 days. However, during production in September 2014, Santhoshkumar Rajan left the project after falling out with the producers, complaining that there was too much interference in the scripting and film-making process. Reports suggested that Vijayakanth would take over as director, though eventually another debutant Surendran, was handed the opportunity. In November 2014, it was revealed that the film's shoot was progressing in Malaysia with two former beauty pageant contestants making their film debuts as the lead actresses. Reports suggested Neha Kapur and Shubra Aiyappa were cast as heroines, while it was later clarified that Neha Hinge and not Kapur was chosen. The team later moved to film action scenes in Thailand, with Kecha Khamphakdee signed up as the stunt choreographer.

== Soundtrack ==
Sagaptham

Soundtrack album by Karthik Raja
- Released: 2015
- Genre: Feature film soundtrack
- Language: Tamil
- Labels: Lahari Music; T-Series
- Producer: Karthik Raja

Karthik Raja chronology
RajadhiRaja (2014)	Sagaptham (2015)	Pagadi Aattam (2017)

The soundtrack is composed by Karthik Raja. On 8 December 2014, Silambarasan, Andrea Jeremiah and Remya Nambeesan recorded a song for the film, which had lyrics written by Parthy Bhaskar.

No.	Song	Singers	Lyrics
1	"Adiye Rathiye"	Silambarasan, Ramya Nambeesan, Andrea Jeremiah	Paarthi Bhaskar
2	"Enakkanavan"	Chinmayi	Pa. Vijay
3	"Karichan Kuruvi"	Karthik, Chinmayi	Na. Muthukumar
4	"Oorukku Perumai"	Vijay Prakash	Viveka
5	"Vaada Vaada"	Ramya NSK, Senthil Dass	Viveka

== Release ==
The satellite rights of the film were sold to Captain TV.

== Reception ==
The Hindu gave the film a negative review for the film stating the appearance of Vijayakanth made the movie "a bit more tolerable". Rediff.com wrote, "Though the plot sounds interesting, it unfolds at an extremely slow pace".
