= Ponram =

Indian film director and screenwriter

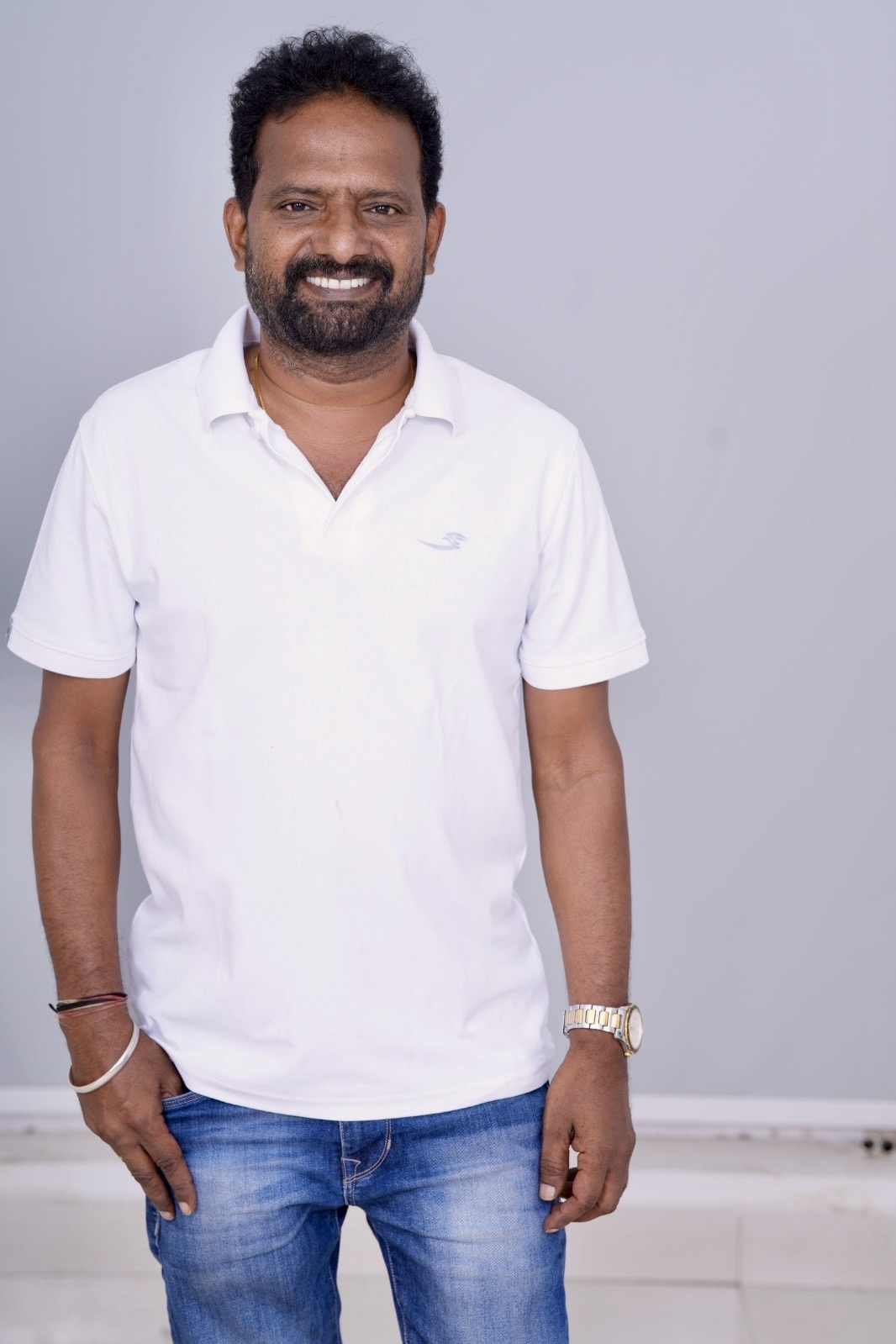
- Ponram in 2025
- Occupations: Director, screenwriter
- Years active: 2007-present

Ponraman Perumal, known professionally as Ponram, is an Indian film director, screenwriter and has worked in Tamil films.

== Career ==
In 2007, he directed Thirutham who has also written the story, screenplay and dialogue.

He directed Sivakarthikeyan in the comedy film Varuthapadatha Valibar Sangam. In a review of the film, a critic stated that the film is a "jolly good fun ride". The film was a commercial success. Ponram went on to work with Sivakarthikeyan in Rajinimurugan (2016) and Seemaraja (2018). Rajinimurugan and Seemaraja received mixed reviews upon release although the former ended up as a commercial success. Ponram also directed Town Bus, starring Gautham Karthik, for the nine-episode anthology series Navarasa; the episode, despite being filmed in October 2020, was not included in the series.

Ponram teamed up with M. Sasikumar and Sathyaraj for MGR Magan (2021). Then, he directed DSP starring Vijay Sethupathi. Ponram makes tame attempts to tap into hIs ability for quirky characters while also trying to deliver a typical revenge drama. He fails at both. In 2025, the next film was Kombuseevi stars Shanmuga Pandian and R. Sarathkumar in lead roles.

== Filmography ==
As director

Year	Film	Notes
2007	Thirutham	credited as Ponraman
2013	Varuthapadatha Valibar Sangam	
2016	Rajinimurugan	
2018	Seemaraja	
2021	MGR Magan	
2022	DSP	
2025	Kombuseevi	
