= Shanmuga Pandian =

Indian actor

- Born: 6 April 1993 (age 33); Chennai, Tamil Nadu, India
- Education: Loyola College, Chennai
- Occupation: Actor
- Years active: 2015 – present
- Parent(s): Vijayakanth (father); Premalatha Vijayakanth (mother)
- Relatives: L.K. Sudhish (uncle); Vijaya Prabhakaran (brother)

Shanmuga Pandian (born 6 April 1993) is an Indian actor who has worked in Tamil-language films. He is the son of actor and politician Vijayakanth.

== Career ==
Shanmuga Pandian made his debut as a leading actor in Sagaptham (2015), co-starring Neha Hinge and Shubra Aiyappa, but the film was heavily panned by critics and failed at the box office. Pandian moved on to work on Thamizhan Endru Sol, again co-starring his father Vijayakanth in a pivotal role, but his father's ill health meant that the project was shelved. Thus, Madura Veeran (2018), based on the issues and politics associated with jallikattu, became his second release.

== Filmography ==
Year	Film	Role	Ref.
2015	Sagaptham	Saga	
2018	Madura Veeran	Durai	
2025	Padai Thalaivan	Velu	
2025	Kombuseevi	Paandi	
