= Kedi Billa Killadi Ranga =

2013 Indian film by Pandiraj

- Theatrical release poster
- Directed by: Pandiraj
- Written by: Pandiraj
- Produced by: Pandiraj; P. Madan
- Starring: Sivakarthikeyan; Vimal; Bindu Madhavi; Regina Cassandra
- Cinematography: Vijay
- Edited by: Athiappan Siva
- Music by: Yuvan Shankar Raja
- Production companies: Pasanga Productions; Escape Artists Motion Pictures
- Distributed by: Studio Green
- Release date: 29 March 2013
- Running time: 132 minutes
- Country: India
- Language: Tamil

Kedi Billa Killadi Ranga (transl. Cunning Billa, clever Ranga) is a 2013 Indian Tamil-language political comedy film written and directed by Pandiraj, who co-produced the film with P. Madan under their respective banners Pasanga Productions and Escape Artists Motion Pictures. The film stars Sivakarthikeyan, Vimal, Bindu Madhavi and Regina Cassandra. It revolves around the title characters, who aspire to become politicians.

The film was announced in June 2012, with filming commencing the following month and ending by January 2013. Filming was predominantly held in Tiruchirappalli, where much of the film was shot at the railway station in Ponmalai. The film's soundtrack and score were composed by Yuvan Shankar Raja, with cinematography handled by Vijay and edited by Athiappan Siva.

Kedi Billa Killadi Ranga was distributed by Studio Green and was released on 29 March 2013. The film opened to positive reviews from critics and audiences and was commercially successful. It was remade in Kannada as Katte (2015).

== Plot ==
The film opens with two unemployed friends from Trichy, "Billa Kesavan" aka "Theni" Kesavan and "Ranga Murugan" aka "Pattai" Murugan, who aspire to become politicians. Murugan meets Parvathy aka Paapaa and falls in love with her, while Kesavan meets Mithra Meenalochini and develops feelings for her. After some confusion, Paapaa and Mithra reciprocate their feelings.

When the Councilor Election is announced, Murugan contests it. Paapaa gives him money to fund his campaign, but he ultimately loses. His father, Aachivardham, dies after falling from a train platform, and Murugan subsequently takes over his father's job.

Meanwhile, Kesavan and Mithra marry, while Murugan and Paapaa wait for their parents' approval. Their parents eventually accept the relationship, and they marry. Murugan and Kesavan later realise the value of life and conclude that it is meaningless without work. They return to their respective homes, where Murugan, upon seeing his father's photograph, writes "DAD IS MY GOD", while Kesavan writes "MY FATHER IS HERO" beneath his father's photograph.

== Cast ==
- Sivakarthikeyan as Pattai Murugan / Ranga Murugan
- Vimal as Theni Kesavan / Billa Kesavan
- Bindu Madhavi as Mithra Meenalochini
- Regina Cassandra as Parvathy (Paapaa)
- Soori as Sindru
- Delhi Ganesh as Chidambaram
- Manoj Kumar as Aachivardham
- Sujatha Sivakumar as Murugan's mother
- Naadodigal Gopal as Mithra's father
- Namo Narayana as Pugazhenthi
- Myna Nandhini as Sindru's wife
- Vazhakku En Muthuraman as Sindru's father-in-law
- Goutham Purusoth
- Rail Ravi

== Production ==
"In the rural areas, the street smart are referred to as 'kedi billas'. My film is about two 'kedis', who are friends. It is not based on a real life story. However, certain scenes are inspired by events that have occurred in my life and those of my friends."

— Pandiraj on the film's title

After the release of Marina (2012), director Pandiraj announced that his subsequent film would be a romantic comedy. He began working on the film's script during mid-March 2012. While reports surfaced that Vimal and Sivakarthikeyan, two of Pandiraj's protégés would play the lead roles, the director later clarified that the script was not ready and that he would begin the casting only after the script was complete; Pandiraj further attributed to an earlier interview, expressing his interest to cast both the actors in the lead roles and the pre-conceived notions resulted in the reports of the actors' casting, since the script was centred on two protagonists. However, in May 2012, Pandiraj confirmed both Vimal and Sivakarthikeyan's involvement in the film. Later that month, Yuvan Shankar Raja was assigned to compose the film's music, in his maiden collaboration with the director.

The film was officially announced in June 2012 with the title Kedi Billa Killadi Ranga; it was named as such to reflect the duality of the film with its protagonists and female leads, while also named after Rajinikanth's films Billa (1980) and Ranga (1982). Pandiraj stated that the film is about the aspirations and dreams of youngsters living in the small towns and villages of Tamil Nadu, who further added that "with TV penetrating even the interiors of India, aspirations and dreams of young men in the villagers have changed. They have started dreaming about living like the city guys. The film is about all that and more." In an interview to The Hindu, he described that though the film's theme is thought provoking, it features "several light moments to entertain the audience" as watching a Charlie Chaplin film.

While the film began production without a female lead, Bindu Madhavi was cast as the first female lead pairing opposite Vimal and Regina Cassandra was chosen as the second female paired opposite Sivakarthikeyan. Filming began in July 2012 at Tiruchirappalli where shooting was held at various places including Ponmalai, Kattur, Jai Nagar, Malaikovil, Subramaniyapuram and Thiruverumbur. By September, around 60 percent of the film's shoot was completed. Much of the portions were shot at the railway station in Ponmalai. Vimal added that since the frequency of trains in this station was very less, the team waited for several hours to shoot a particular sequence. On 30 January 2013, Sivakarthikeyan announced via Twitter (now X) that filming on Kedi Billa Killadi Ranga had been completed.

== Soundtrack ==
Yuvan Shankar Raja composed the soundtrack for Kedi Billa Killadi Ranga, working the first time with director Pandiraj. The audio of the film was to be launched on 6 February 2013 at the Satyam Cinemas in Chennai, but had been cancelled, owing to the case filed by R Jayaraman of RS Infotainment against P Madan the co-producer of Kedi Billa Killadi Ranga. The album was eventually released on 15 February 2013.

== Marketing and release ==
The film's distribution rights were secured by K. E. Gnanavel Raja's Studio Green in November 2012. The teaser trailer was launched on 11 January 2013 and was attached to the theatrical prints of the Karthi-starrer Alex Pandian, which was produced by Studio Green. Venkat Prabhu, Premgi Amaren and VTV Ganesh were hired for a promotional video, which was launched on the internet and television before the film's theatrical release.

Kedi Billa Killadi Ranga was earlier scheduled for release during January 2013, on the eve of Pongal, but the production was not complete by then. The team then planned to release the film in April 2013 after public examinations being concluded. In mid-March 2013, the team finalised the release as 29 March 2013, coinciding with the Good Friday and Easter weekend. Kedi Billa Killadi Ranga was released along with three other films, Chennaiyil Oru Naal, Azhagan Azhagi and Keeripulla. It opened in 332 screens across Tamil Nadu. Ayngaran International acquired the film's distribution rights in the United Kingdom and released in theatres across Ilford, Wandsworth, Feltham, Sheffield, Milton Keynes, Liverpool, Enfield, Crawley, Stockport, Bradford, Glasgow, Cardiff.

=== Critical reception ===
Critic based at Sify rated three-and-a-half out of five stars and wrote: "The film works big time due to Pandiraj's dialogues and presentation and it will especially appeal to the family audiences. Comedy and sentiments are packaged well to provide wholesome entertainment. First half could have been crisper, but still a thoroughly enjoyable comedy entertainer." M. Suganth of The Times of India also rated three-and-a-half out of five, summarising "By now, the tale of a wastrel turning responsible has been done to death in Tamil cinema but what sets this film apart is in the refreshingly effortless manner in which the director spins his tale." A critic from Kalki called the film watchable. S. Saraswathi of Rediff.com wrote "Though the film deals with a sensitive subject, director Pandiraj injects a good dose of humour and makes it more enjoyable."

In contrast, a reviewer based at In.com rated two stars, summarising "the film doesn't take itself seriously at any point and entertains in parts." According to Baradwaj Rangan, "Had a first-time filmmaker made Kedi Billa Killadi Ranga, we may have smiled indulgently at the handful of scenes and lines that worked [...] But with Pandiraj, whose work since the charming (and National Award-winning) Pasanga has yielded steadily diminishing returns, there is a bit of dismay that yet another promising filmmaker has decided to genuflect before the Holy Trinity of present-day Tamil cinema: natpu (transl. friendship), sarakku (transl. booze) and thathuvam (transl. philosophy)." A critic from Kalki concluded that the film was watchable.

=== Box office ===
According to Sify, the film garnered a "decent opening" across 300 theatres in Tamil Nadu. By the first weekend, the film garnered ₹10 crore (equivalent to ₹19 crore or US$1.9 million in 2026) becoming a profitable venture to the distributors, due to its small budget. The film completed its 100-day theatrical run on 5 July 2013.

== Remakes ==
In July 2013, it was reported that the film would be remade in Hindi with Shahid Kapoor playing one of the protagonists but never came into fruition. The film was remade in Kannada as Katte (2015).

== Cancelled sequel ==
A spiritual successor entitled Kedi Billa Killadi Ranga 2 was also reported to be under production in February 2016, with G. V. Prakash Kumar playing the lead role, but that film never materialised.
