= Rajinimurugan =

2016 Tamil comedy film directed by Ponram

- Theatrical release poster
- Directed by: Ponram
- Written by: Ponram
- Produced by: N. Linguswamy; N. Subash Chandra Bose; Dhaval Jayantilal Gada
- Starring: Sivakarthikeyan; Rajkiran; Keerthy Suresh; Soori; Samuthirakani; Achyuth Kumar
- Cinematography: Balasubramaniem
- Edited by: Vivek Harshan
- Music by: D Imman
- Production company: Thirrupathi Brothers
- Distributed by: Pen Studios
- Release date: 14 January 2016
- Running time: 158 minutes
- Country: India
- Language: Tamil

Rajinimurugan is a 2016 Indian Tamil-language masala film written and directed by Ponram. It is produced by N. Lingusamy and N. Subash Chandra Bose under Thirrupathi Brothers. The film stars Sivakarthikeyan in the titular role, alongside Keerthy Suresh, Soori, Rajkiran, P. Samuthirakani and Achyuth Kumar. It is the second directorial venture of Ponram, and his second collaboration with Sivakarthikeyan, after Varuthapadatha Valibar Sangam (2013). In the film, a jobless youth decides to sell his grandfather's property in order to become rich.

The film features soundtrack composed by D. Imman, with all lyrics were written by Yugabharathi. The cinematography was handled by Balasubramaniem, and edited by Vivek Harshan. Filming took place extensively in Madurai and Karaikkudi. The film's principal photography was commenced on 25 August 2014, and the shooting completed in March 2015.

Rajinimurugan, which faced multiple postponements, released on 14 January 2016, during the Pongal festival became a critical and commercial success. The film was remade in Kannada as Raj Vishnu in 2017.

== Plot ==
Rajini Murugan is an unemployed youth from Madurai who spends his days roaming around with his best friend Thotathree and supplying food to his grandfather Ayyankalai, a highly respected gentleman who has large properties of land. Ayyankalai wants to divide all his properties among his children and grandchildren, but except Rajini Murugan and his father Malligarajan, who is the headmaster of the local school, the rest of the family is settled abroad and never visit Madurai.

Meanwhile, following the advice of an astrologer (who claimed that Rajini Murugan will get married and be rich within three months), Rajini Murugan starts wooing his childhood sweetheart Karthika Devi. Karthika's father Neelakandan, an ardent fan of Rajinikanth, was the best friend of Malligarajan and had given Rajini Murugan his name when he was born, but fell out with Malligarajan and his family due to a misunderstanding involving Rajini Murugan and Karthika when they were youngsters. Since then, Rajini Murugan and Karthika are not on speaking terms, and Neelakandan forbids any sort of contact between the two. Nevertheless, Rajini Murugan opens a tea stall outside Karthika's house to stay close to her and follows her day and night. The stall is later destroyed by a customer who pulls down the shop in the process of taking a banana. Later, he and Thothathree start a real estate company. A gangster "Ezhrai" Mookan, whose only work is to extort ₹100,000 from businessmen, tries to swindle the same amount from Rajini Murugan, but fails and ends up paying ₹100,000 to him.

Ayyankalai, who is fed up with Rajini Murugan's antics, decides to immediately divide his properties so that Rajini Murugan can benefit from his share of the property. He fakes his death, which forces his children and grandchildren to come to Madurai. Mookan claims that he too is a grandson of Ayyankalai (through the son of Ayyankalai's first wife) and starts demanding his share of the property. This leads to confrontation between Rajini Murugan and Mookan and their feud is soon brought before the panchayat. The panchayat declares the verdict in favour of Ayyankalai and Rajini Murugan. Mookan, accepting defeat, receives ₹100,000 from Rajini Murugan as compensation. It is then revealed that Mookan staged the whole drama to get back his ₹100,000 from Rajini Murugan. Meanwhile, Karthika accepts Rajini Murugan's love and Neelakandan also begins to approve their relationship.

In the end, Ayyankalai reveals that he does have a grandson through his first wife's son. The grandson is revealed to be none other than Bosepandi from Varuthapadatha Valibar Sangam. Bosepandi refuses to accept his share of his grandfather's property, advising him and his family not to sell the property and instead convert it into a 5-star hotel and hand it over to Rajini Murugan. Ayyankalai and Rajini Murugan agree with him.

== Cast ==
- Sivakarthikeyan in a dual role as
  - Rajini Murugan
  - Bosepandi (cameo appearance)
- Rajkiran as Ayyankalai, Rajini Murugan's and Bosepandi's grandfather
- Keerthy Suresh as Karthika Devi (KD)
- Soori as Thothathri, Rajini Murugan's best friend
- Samuthirakani as "Ezhrai" Mookan
- G. Gnanasambandam as Malligairajan, Rajini Murugan's father
- Achyuth Kumar as Neelakandan, Karthika's father, Malligairajan's friend, and a hardcore Rajini fan
- Dheepa Ramanujam as Rajini Murugan's mother
- Manobala as Kunjithapatham, Audi Car Showroom Manager
- Namo Narayana as Thatpot Thangavel, Panchayath party
- Vela Ramamoorthy as Chellakarupan, Head of Usilampatti Panchayath
- Andreanne as Andrea
- Subramaniapuram Raja as Thangapandi, Panchayath party
- Supergood Subramani as Police Officer
- Hello Kandasamy as astrologer
- Thavasi as Madasamy
- Meena Vemuri as Rajini Murugan's Aunt
- Bhawana Aneja
- Naadodigal Gopal as Thotathree's father
- Gajaraj as Rajinimurugan's relative
- Darshan as Rajini Murugan's Younger Brother
- Baba Bhaskar (special appearance in the song "Yennama Ipadi Panreengalaema")

== Production ==
=== Development ===
In August 2013, prior to the release of Varuthapadatha Valibar Sangam, it was announced that the film's lead actor Sivakarthikeyan and director Ponram would reunite for another project which would be produced by N. Lingusamy's Thirrupathi Brothers. Ponram also retained the technical crew—musician D. Imman, cinematographer Balasubramaniem and editor Vivek Harshan—for this project as well. Sivakarthikeyan added that the film is an extension of their previous film, as it was intended to be a comedy film set in rural areas, but would focus on a different message, which would revolve around family values and relationships.

The film's title Rajinimurugan was announced in August 2014. Regarding the title, Lingusamy said at the film's audio launch that it was chosen at the time during the nationwide controversy of Main Hoon Rajinikanth, which led actor Rajinikanth to file a case against the makers of that film. (Note: The title was now changed to Main Hoon Part-Time Killer.) But when Lingusamy explained to him regarding the significance as well as his adulation to the star, Rajinikanth graciously agreed to proceed with.

=== Casting ===
Sivakarthikeyan was reported to play a real-estate broker in the film and was asked to lose weight for his role. Soori who acted him in Varuthapadatha Valibar Singam also returned to play comic relief. Initially, Lakshmi Menon was cast as the film's lead actress, but left as she had to focus on her education and board examinations. Tamannaah Bhatia was also rumoured to play the female lead which proved untrue. Keerthy Suresh was then chosen to play the female lead, thereby marking her Tamil sophomore after Idhu Enna Maayam (2015). Keerthy stated in an interview to The Hindu that she accepted the role after Ponram's narration where the father-daughter bonding immediately appealed to her.

Rajkiran was selected to play the role of Sivakarthikeyan's grandfather in the film. He said that he signed fifteen scripts post the release of Manjapai and found this to appeal him because of the significance of his role and the message. P. Samuthirakani was chosen to play the antagonist. The film also featured an ensemble cast such as Achyuth Kumar, G. Gnanasambandan, Dheepa Ramanujam, and French actress Andreanne Nouyrigat in other prominent roles. Sivakarthikeyan's friend Darshan, who would later make his breakthrough in Kanaa (2018), appeared in a minor uncredited role as the protagonist's brother.

=== Filming ===
Principal photography was intended to begin in August 2014, but ultimately commenced on 30 October 2014 at Karaikudi. A traditional house had been rented for the film, to shoot the family portions there. Much of the important portions revolving around the family had been shot in the first schedule that took place for 40 days. Afterwards the team moved to Madurai for filming the second schedule which took 25 days for shooting. For the costumes, designer Sathya NJ said that Sivakarthikeyan will be seen sporting in 30 shirts stitched specifically for the actor.

The song "Yennamma Ippadi Panreengalema" was shot in Madurai, followed by the climax portions which was shot during February. Over 75 percent of the film had been shot during that period, except for a major schedule. During that period, Keerthy fell ill which resulted in the production being paused temporarily. Filming then resumed for another important sequence needed to be shot. Though it was reported that a major accident happened at the sets of the film's production, Sivakarthikeyan dismissed the rumours, claiming that he was fine. On 18 April 2015, the production company announced that the filming had wrapped.

== Soundtrack ==
The soundtrack to Rajinimurugan features ten tracks: five songs, a remix and karaoke versions of the tracks – all of them were composed by D. Imman. The lyrics for all the songs were penned by Yugabharathi. One song, "Yennamma Ippadi Panreengalema" was released on 25 May 2015 at the Super Singer World Tour, held at Suntec City in Singapore. The album was launched on 10 June 2015, at a formal event held in Taj Coromandel hotel and was telecasted live on Thanthi TV. After the film's release, three more songs were added as bonus tracks on 24 February 2016.

== Release ==
The film's first look was launched at the 6th Vijay Awards on 25 April 2015 which indicated the film's initial scheduled release on 17 July, coinciding the eve of Ramzan. During the film's production, Thirrupathi Brothers suffered losses due to the failure of Lingusamy's Anjaan (2014) thereby affecting this film and Uttama Villain, both produced by the company; Lingusamy eventually sold both the films to Eros International for worldwide distribution, Studio Green for the domestic distribution and Zee Tamil for the satellite rights, to easen the financial problems. Though the release issues and eventual failure of Uttama Villain impacted the production house, Lingusamy and Sivakarthikeyan ensured the timely release of the film and assured it to be a profitable venture. The teaser which released during the film's audio launch was well received.

The film was then postponed from the initial release due to clash with Dhanush's Maari. In late-August, it was announced that the film would be released on Vinayagar Chathurthi (17 September) after Vijay's Puli which earlier scheduled for release on that date had been postponed to 1 October. Promotional campaign began thereafter, with the film being censored in September 2015 with a U certificate from the Central Board of Film Certification. Vendhar Movies eventually took over the domestric distribution rights from Studio Green.

However, few days before the scheduled 17 September release, it was announced that the film was postponed. It was widely speculated due to the financial problems within Lingusamy and Eros International as the former had owed the company a huge sum of ₹20 crore (equivalent to ₹33 crore or US$3.4 million in 2026) because of Uttama Villain's failure. Eventual plans of release on the Dusshera festival (21 October) also turned to be futile. Trade circles anticipated the film might not face a smooth release like Madha Gaja Raja (2025) even though Lingusamy had assured reimbursements to Eros International, as other distributors and financiers needed compensation from Lingusamy.

By late-November, it was announced that the film would release on 4 December, having cleared the recurring debts. However, the film was delayed again, this time due to the 2015 South Indian Floods. As a result, the film's release date was pushed to 14 January 2016, coinciding the Pongal weekend. The film released along with Gethu, Kathakali and Thaarai Thappattai, all on the same date. Pen Studios led by Jayantilal Gada eventually entered as a co-producer and distributor to ensure the timely release, while Sivakarthikeyan also forfeited his salary in that process.

== Reception ==
The Times of India, rated the film 3 out of 5 stars, stating that "The film is overlong with innumerable songs and comic scenes that could have been left at the editing table. It is also utterly unambitious, content with clearing its low bar, but this unpretentiousness is also what makes it work to an extent." The Guardian rated it 3 out of 5 stars, saying, "This long-gestating slice of fun about the successes of the world's least ambitious individual is a likable, irreverent ride". The Hindu wrote that "Rajini Murugan makes it amply evident that Sivakarthikeyan, as he has done earlier in his career, is quite capable of making a below-average script seem average, sometimes, above-average even. Perhaps that's why dozens of little stars come together to form the title."

Sify rated the film 4 out of 5 stars, stating that "Rajini Murugan is a tailor made festival film, which is sure to enthrall and entertain the masses. The film's director Ponram has packaged the film in such a way that audiences will leave the movie hall with a big smile and forget all their worries. Thanks to the brilliant chemistry between the comedy-duo Sivakarthikeyan and Soori, the film is a laugh riot which holds no pretensions." S. Saraswathi from Rediff.com rated 2.5 out of 5 stars, and reviewed "Director Ponram's Rajini Murugan has no real plot, nor any remarkable characters or poignant moments but good music, vibrant visuals and spontaneity and charm of its lead actor makes it a fun watch".

In contrast, Gauthaman Baskaran for the Hindustan Times, rated 1 out of 5 stars, and reviewed it as "Hackneyed plotlines, silly jokes and endless song-and-dance--that is much of Tamil film industry's lot. Sadly, Rajini Murugan falls in that lot. A big bore." The Indian Express reviewed it as "Even with its predictable storyline, Sivakarthikeyan makes the film work, and only he can save a film like this." Silverscreen reviewed the film as "Rajini Murugan is an assembly line. Formerly managed by M Rajesh, now run by Ponram. The saving grace might have been a competent antagonist. But, no. It's almost an insult that one of our best actors today – Samuthirakani – is reduced to a joke. Rajini Murugan gives us a hero who seems to be a parody, and a spineless jokey riff for a villain."
