= Netru Indru =

2014 Indian film by Padmamagan

- Film poster
- Directed by: Padmamagan
- Written by: Padmamagan
- Produced by: S. Malathy
- Starring: Prasanna; Vimal; Richard Rishi; Harish; Bharani; Arundhati; Manochitra
- Cinematography: Dinesh Sre
- Edited by: C. S. Prem
- Music by: Rehhan
- Production company: 26699 Cinema
- Release date: 19 June 2014
- Country: India
- Language: Tamil

Netru Indru (transl. Yesterday, Today) is a 2014 Indian Tamil-language action drama film, directed by Padmamagan, a filmmaker who earlier directed Pallavan and the R. Parthiban-starrer Ammuvagiya Naan. Prasanna and Vimal, along with Richard Rishi and Bharani of Naadodigal fame, played the lead roles, while Arundhati and Manochitra were the female leads. Rehhan scored the music for the film, while Dinesh Sre was the cinematographer and C. S. Prem was the editor. Shot entirely in forests of South India, Netru Indru draws a parallel between events happened in the past and ones that happens in the present in the forest. Produced by S. Malathy, it was expected to hit the screens in August 2013, but it did not release on the projected release date but after several delays in June 2014.

== Cast ==
- Prasanna as DSP David / Patchai
- Vimal as Sivaji
- Richard Rishi as Sathya
- Shafi as Selvam
- Bharani as Arivazhagan
- Ponvannan as Raghavan
- Arish Kumar as Narayanan
- Manochitra as Dhamini
- Arundhati as Akhila
- Lollu Sabha Manohar as Venky
- Gemini Balaji as Captain Esakki Muthu
- Rajendran as Vettu Vinayagam
- Nitish Veera as Guru
- Sabarna as Lavanya
- Kamalesh as Murugan
- Mime Gopi as Dasappan
- Sampath Ram as Veera

== Production ==
In August 2012, it was reported that director Padmamagan was starting a new film titled Koothu with Vimal and Prasanna in the lead. The director claimed that it was not "a run of the mill love story" but a thriller with a "unique screenplay". He further stated, "Koothu is a green journey in my life amid rocks and isolated forests with no human approach. We were in dense jungles to conduct shooting for Koothu. It is an extravaganza of nature's bounty." Alongside Vimal and Prasanna, upcoming actors Richard Rishi, Bharani, Harish and Nithish were part of the principal cast, while Manochitra (then named Nandhagi) and Arundhathi were signed as the female leads.

The film was shot in 65 days in the dense forests around the border of Tamil Nadu and Kerala. Filming locations include places such as Malabar Coast, south Deccan Plateaus, Western Ghats mountain rainforests, Andhra Pradesh and Pondicherry.

The film's trailer was released in August 2012 and after a period of inactivity, the title was changed in March 2013 from Koothu to Netru Indru and an audio launch function was held. Prasanna revealed that Vimal had forgone his salary for the film, as a result of the producer's financial problems. The film received an A certificate from the Censor Board, with the director stating, "For commercial value, we wanted heroines for the film. Once we got them on board, the glamour quotient went a bit out of hand. But the whole thing suited the story very well than we expected. So we decided not to compromise the film by taking a U certificate".

== Soundtrack ==
Netru Indru

Soundtrack album by Rehaan
- Released: 2014
- Genre: Feature film soundtrack
- Language: Tamil

Rehaan chronology
Vannathupoochi (2009)	Netru Indru (2014)

Music was composed by Rehaan.

No.	Song	Singers	Length
1	"Aappa"	Richard	3:04
2	"Akila"	Richard, Hemambika	4:56
3	"Kaavalkara"	Nincy	4:19
4	"Pangali"	Vijay Prakash	4:50
5	"Vellithirai"	Silambarasan	4:09

== Critical reception ==
The Times of India gave the film 1.5 stars out of 5 and wrote, "Every once in a while, there comes a film that makes you go 'Am I really seeing this?' and Netru Indru is that kind of film — a film so bad that it's good. It is unashamedly crass, exploitative and downright sexist".
