= Kutti Pisasu =

2010 film by Rama Narayanan

- Tamil version poster
- Directed by: Rama Narayanan
- Written by: Rama Narayanan
- Produced by: Rama Narayanan
- Starring: Geethika; Ramji; Rajiv Kanakala; Ravishankar Gowda; Sangeetha; Ramya Krishnan; Kaveri; Mithila Naik
- Cinematography: K. Selvaraj
- Edited by: Rajkeerthi
- Music by: Deva
- Production company: Sri Thenandal Films
- Release date: 7 May 2010
- Country: India
- Languages: Tamil; Kannada; Telugu

Kutti Pisasu in Tamil, Bombat Car in Kannada and Cara Majaka in Telugu is a 2010 Indian multilingual fantasy film written and directed by Rama Narayanan, who returns after an eight-year sabbatical. The film stars Baby Geethika, Ramji, Rajiv Kanakala, Ravishankar Gowda, Sangeetha, Mithila Naik, and Ramya Krishnan, while Riyaz Khan, Shafi, Ganja Karuppu, and Nassar play supporting roles. Each version has a slightly different supporting cast. The Tamil version was dubbed in Hindi as Magic Robot and in Bengali as Robot - The Magic Car.

== Plot ==
The film opens with Kaali / Kalika (Ramya Krishnan) establishing her powers with a couple of sequences, including reducing a screen scorcher (Nassar) to a pale shadow. Cut to the present, where Priya / Durga (Geethika) is the intelligent daughter of Ramji / Ravishankar Gowda / Rajiv Kanakala and Gayathri (Sangeetha), who treat her like the apple of their eyes. Soon, she is possessed by the spirit of Savithri (Kaveri / Mithila Naik), who was ditched by her fiancé Nanjappan / Mahendra (Riyaz Khan). With the help of Kaali, it is the now the turn of Savithri and her brother (Ganja Karuppu / Sharan / Ali) to take revenge. How they punish Nanjappan / Mahendra and his sorcerer friend (Shafi) is the rest of the story.

== Cast ==
Actor (Tamil)	Actor (Telugu)	Actor (Kannada)	Role (Tamil)	Role (Kannada)	Role (Telugu)
Baby Geethika			Priya	Priya	Durga
Sangeetha			Gayathri	Gayathri	Gayathri
Ramya Krishnan			Goddess Kaali	Goddess Kalika	Goddess Kalika
Riyaz Khan			Nanjappan	Selvadore	Nagendra
Ganja Karuppu	Ali	Sharan	Karuppu	Rambabu	
Kaveri		Mithila Naik	Savithri	Savithri	Savithri
Delhi Ganesh	L. B. Sriram	Doddanna	Priya's grandfather	Priya's grandfather	Durga's grandfather
Ramji	Rajiv Kanakala	Ravishankar Gowda	Priya's father	Priya's father	Durga's father
Kadhal Dhandapani					
Shafi			Mandhira Moorthy	Mantra Moorthy	Mantra Moorthy
Amit Tiwari			Nanjappan's friend	Selvadore's friend	Mahendra's friend
Nassar			British man	British man	British man
Livingston		Killer Venkatesh	Police officer	Police officer	Police officer
Alex			Horse rider	Horse rider	Horse rider
K. Sivasankar			Dance master	Dance master	Dance master
—N/a		Bank Janardhan	Waiter	Waiter	Waiter

Tamil version

- Ramji as Pichumani
- Dhandapani as Kudu Kuduppu Kullamuni

Telugu version

- Rajeev Kanakala
- L. B. Sriram as Shastry

Kannada version

- Ravishankar Gowda
- Doddanna
- Dhandapani as Budubuduke Kullamuni

== Production ==
Geetika was cast in this film after winning season 5 of the Telugu-language dance show Aata Juniors. She was credited in Kannada as Kruthika. A Morris Minor car that turns into a giant named "Car Man" is the film's antagonist. The car that featured in the film was made specially for the movie. Actress Sangeetha was cast as one of the leads.

== Soundtrack ==
Soundtrack was composed by Deva.

Tamil Tracklist

No.	Song	Singers	Lyrics	Length (m:ss)
1	"Dole Dole"	Vaishali, Chorus	Jayanth	04:51
2	"Chennai Pattanam"	Vaishali	R. Pawan	04:23
3	"Thangachi"	Krishnaraj, K. S. Chithra	Rama Narayanan	05:00
4	"Kutti Pisasu"	Divya, Vaishali	Erode Iraivan	05:18

Kannada Tracklist

No.	Song	Lyrics
1	"Putta Putta"	Dwarki Raghav
2	"Gelliri Nammavaru"	Dwarki Raghav
3	"Nanna Mudhu Tangi"	Dwarki Raghav
4	"Damaku Damaku"	Dwarki Raghav

Telugu Tracklist

No.	Song
1	"Dole Dole"
2	"Gelupu Naadi Gajala"
3	"Tallini Minchu"
4	"Konte Pisachi"

== Critical reception ==
Tamil version

Sify wrote "The special effects and graphics are just ok; otherwise there is nothing in the film. Ramanarayanan has tried to mix witchcraft, sorcery, crass comedy with modern graphics borrowed from films like ?The Transformer? and ?The Car?. It is meant strictly for the consumption of interior Tamil Nadu audiences." The Times of India wrote "This is strictly for the masses, and although may turn out to be cotton candy for mothers and kids, you can't help feeling that Rama Narayanan has been away from direction for too long. It shows." Rediff wrote "Story-wise, there's no great variation from predecessors like all the Amma movies but this one comes with an interesting ghost-twist. On the flip side, the production values are tacky, the acting juvenile and the screenplay downright silly." The Hindu wrote "There's little to say in terms of story or production value. Strange, considering director Rama. Narayanan is a veteran in children's and godly movies, even if they are terribly over-the-top!".

Kannada version

Deccan Herald opined that "With most films boasting of superior, state-of-art technology, "Bombat Car" looks like a pathetic attempt to win back the traditional audience of such films - women and small children. However, with able support from the graphics and special effects guys, the effect is tolerable - the handsome robot dancing in tandem with the prancing kid, not at all conveying menace. Bangalore Mirror wrote that Rama Narayanan "manages to keep the film interesting. There is no logic to what transpires, but it is fun to watch. And it won't be just kids who will find it enjoyable.
