= Manochitra =

Indian actress

- Born: Manochithra J 5 March 1987 (age 39); Kanchipuram, Tamil Nadu, India
- Other name: Nandhagi
- Occupation: Actress
- Years active: 2011–present

Manochitra (born 5 March 1987) is an Indian actress who has appeared in Tamil, Malayalam, Kannada, and Telugu films.

== Career ==
Manochitra made her acting debut with (2010) under the screen name of Nandhagi. She then met the Casting Director Thangaraj Lakshminarayanan at the Kancheepuram Kamakshi temple and he requested her to star opposite Jai in his next venture. During the production of Aval Peyar Thamizharasi, where she played the title role, the director Meera Kathiravan asked the actress to avoid interviews and to be kept away from the promotional activity to maintain the suspense of her identity till the audio launch of the film. She was credited as Nandhagi. The film became an average grosser at the box office but won critical acclaim and she was nominated for the Vijay Award for Best Debut Actress. The actress then re-christened herself to her birthname Manochitra. She soon after the release began working on a project titled Thandavakone with debutante director Ganesh as well as Ithanai Naalai Engirundai with R. Balu opposite Ananda Kannan. However, neither of the films have been released and remain stuck in the production phase. Another film titled Kalingathu Parani with Vimal was also shelved halfway through production after the producer ran out of funds.

In 2012, Manochitra played a supporting role in Seenu Ramasamy's Neerparavai. In 2014, she made a comeback featuring in the multi-starrer Netru Indru alongside Prasanna and Vimal and she also acted in the action film Veeram directed by Siva. Manochitra made her debut in Telugu cinema with Malligadu Marriage Bureau (2014) in which she paired with Telugu actor Srikanth and in Malayalam cinema with Pianist (2014). Manochitra then signed to play in Oru Vaanavil Poley, the remake of Pianist, and the Telugu film Nattu Kodi. Both films remained unreleased for unknown reasons. In 2016, she acted in Andaman (2016) where she was paired with actor Richard Rishi.

== Filmography ==
- All films are in Tamil, unless otherwise noted.

Year	Film	Role	Notes
2010	Innoruvan	Kavinaya	Credited as Manoha
2010	Aval Peyar Thamizharasi	Thamizharasi	Credited as Nandhagi; Nominated, Vijay Award for Best Debut Actress
2012	Neerparavai	Annachi's sister 2nd lead	
2014	Veeram	Anita	
2014	Malligadu Marriage Bureau	Madhu	Telugu film
2014	Pianist	Nyla	Malayalam film
2014	Netru Indru	Dhamini	
2016	Andaman	Divya	
TBA	Puthiya Mugam		
TBA	Room		Tamil, Telugu, Kannadam, Malayalam Film
TBA	Thandagan		
2021	Jai Sena		Telugu
