= Innoruvan =

- Directed by: S. T. Gunasekaran
- Written by: S. T. Gunasekaran
- Produced by: S. P. Chandrasekar; Krishnaveni Chandrasekar
- Starring: Adithya; Manoha
- Cinematography: G. Kanagaraj
- Edited by: R. T. Annadurai
- Music by: Aadhish Uthriyan
- Production company: Atchaya Multimedia Creations
- Release date: 6 March 2009
- Running time: 155 minutes
- Country: India
- Language: Tamil

Innoruvan (transl. Another man) is a 2009 Indian Tamil-language comedy drama film directed by S. T. Gunasekaran. The film stars newcomers Adithya and Manoha, with Visu, Manivannan, M. S. Bhaskar, Kadhal Dhandapani, R. Aravindraj, Pasi Sathya, Vincent Roy, P. R. Varalakshmi, and Crane Manohar playing supporting roles. It was released on 6 March 2009.

== Plot ==
Siva (Adithya) is a naive ragpicker who works for Vaali (M. S. Bhaskar) and lives with his widow mother (Pasi Sathya). His life changes when he meets a judge (Visu) who motivates him and lectures him about Swami Vivekananda's principles and philosophies. Siva dreams to buy a closed paper mill, so he decides to work hard and with positive thinking to realise his dream. In the meantime, Siva falls in love with the college student Kavinaya (Manoha), daughter of the greedy politician Sadhasivam (Manivannan). Siva starts to woo her, and it annoys Kavinaya. Therefore, she and her father get Siva arrested, and the police brutally beat him up. Thereafter, Kavinaya understands Siva's feelings and eventually accepts his true love. Sadhasivam cheats the local minister and idol smuggler Aranganayagam (Kadhal Dhandapani). He takes away his 1000 crores of rupees and escapes with the money. Aranganayagam's henchmen then try to abduct Kavinaya, but Siva comes to her rescue and saves her. Thereafter, Siva gets a bank loan thanks to the help of a well-wisher and rents a paper-mill. With the support of a corrupt cop (Vincent Roy), Aranganayagam once again abducts Kavinaya. To save his lover, Siva steals a Murugan idol in a famous temple and hides it in Aranganayagam's house. When the police search into Aranganayagam's house, they find several idols and arrests him; thus, Kavinaya is saved. The film ends with Siva buying the paper mill of his dream.

== Cast ==
- Adithya as Siva
- Manoha as Kavinaya
- Visu as Judge
- Manivannan as Sadhasivam
- M. S. Bhaskar as Vaali
- Kadhal Dhandapani as Aranganayagam
- R. Aravindraj as Police Inspector
- Pasi Sathya as Siva's mother
- Vincent Roy as Assistant Commissioner
- P. R. Varalakshmi as Aranganayagam's wife
- Crane Manohar
- Swaminathan
- Easter as LIC Agent
- Kalidoss as Swamy
- Gowthami Vembunathan
- Azhagu
- Risha in a special appearance
- Vahini in a special appearance

== Production ==
S. T. Gunasekaran, a former associate of director R. Aravindraj, made his directorial debut with Innoruvan. The film was launched on 5 April 2008 at the AVM Studios in Chennai. Newcomers Adithya and Manoha were signed to play the lead roles. Veteran actors like Visu, Manivannan, Dhandapani, M. S. Bhaskar and Crane Manohar were hired to play prominent roles. G. Kanagaraj took care of camera works while Aadhish Uthriyan scored the music and the editing was handled by R. T. Annadurai. Actor M. S. Bhaskar sang a Gaana song in the film. The film was shot in Pondicherry, Courtallam and Ambasamudram.

== Soundtrack ==
The soundtrack was composed by Aadhish Uthriyan. The soundtrack, released in 2009, features 5 tracks with lyrics written by S. P. Chandrasekar, Kadhalmadhi and S. T. Gunasekaran.

Song	Duration
"Kaadal Desathile"	4:45
"Vellarikkaya Vanthu Daaham Theeredi"	3:43
"Neeralayee Thanneralayee"	4:08
"Siva Sivaa Siva"	3:57
"En Kathaliye Kandaal"	4:59

== Release and reception ==
The film was released on 6 March 2009. Pavithra Srinivasan of Rediff.com rated the film 1.5 out of 5 and said, "Innoruvan is 20 years too late". S. R. Ashok Kumar of The Hindu said, "Atchaya Multi Media’s ‘Innoruvan’ has a positive message with a neat story line on which bank the happenings. But the main problem with it is the commercial elements". The New Indian Express wrote, "Appreciable is the debutant director’s effort to convey a relevant, positive message: That nothing is impossible if you put your mind to it. The first half is focused and deftly handled, the scenes having a smooth flow. But somewhere towards the second half, the director loses his focus".
