= Thudikkum Karangal =

Thudikkum Karangal (lit. 'Throbbing Hands') may refer to:

- Thudikkum Karangal (1983 film), an Indian Tamil-language action drama film by C. V. Sridhar
- Thudikkum Karangal (2023 film), an Indian Tamil-language action crime drama film
