= Sakthivel (disambiguation) =

Sakthivel may refer to:

- Balaji Sakthivel Indian actor
- Vetrivel Sakthivel Indian Tamil-language action comedy film
