= Kirataka =

2011 Indian film by Pradeep Kumar

- Film poster
- Directed by: Pradeep Kumar
- Screenplay by: Pradeep Kumar
- Based on: Kalavani by A. Sarkunam
- Produced by: Sharavana Murthy; Shantha Kumari
- Starring: Yash; Oviya
- Cinematography: R. Selva
- Edited by: Palani Vel
- Music by: V. Manohar
- Production company: Amigo Indirajal Movies
- Release date: 24 June 2011
- Running time: 161 minutes
- Country: India
- Language: Kannada
- Budget: ₹50 lakhs
- Box office: ₹3 crores

Kirataka is a 2011 Indian Kannada-language romantic comedy film directed by Pradeep Kumar, starring Yash and Oviya in the lead roles. It is a remake of Tamil film Kalavani (2010). The film was a success at the domestic box-office. This was the 3000th Kannada movie to be released.

== Plot ==
The film is centered around the rivalry between two neighboring villages with rival gangs in both competing in every aspect. Nandisha (Yash), also known as Gooli, is a roadside Romeo with no real direction in life. He is flanked by his friends who support him in every act. Meanwhile, he falls in love with Nethra (Oviya), a girl studying at a college in the neighboring town. While Nandisha is busy with his love life, one of his friends likes a girl from the neighboring village. To help him in the act, he plans to elope the girl and almost succeeds with his plan, but it is finally disrupted due to a problem in their vehicle. After this the rivalry between the two villages reaches a high with Nethra's brother vowing to avenge the dishonor. The rest of the movie revolves around how Gooli manages to win over Nethra despite the rivalry.

== Cast ==
- Yash as Nandisha alias Gooli
- Oviya as Nethra
- T. S. Nagabharana as Basavegowda, Nandisha's father
- Tara as Nandisha's mother
- Sanketh Kashi as Panchayati Paremeshi
- Daniel Balaji as Seena
- Chikkanna as Gooli's friend

== Production ==
The film was initially announced under the title of My Name is Kirataka with Nandita Swetha as the heroine.

== Soundtrack ==
Kirataka

Soundtrack album by V. Manohar
- Released: 9 May 2011
- Genre: Feature film soundtrack
- Language: Kannada
- Label: Anand Audio

V. Manohar composed the music of the film and wrote the lyrics for six soundtrack, while the lyrics for the soundtrack "Dhanakku Dandaa" penned by Pradeep Raj. The soundtrack album has seven songs. The song "Dhanakku Dandaa" was notable for, its lyrics had the names of 108 villages of Mandya district, which was the backdrop in which the film was set in. The song "Dhamma Dhamma" from the original Tamil film was retained here.

The soundtrack album was officially released on 9 May 2011 at the Le Méridien hotel in Bangalore.

Track listing
No.	Title	Lyrics	Singer(s)	Length
1.	"Dhanakku Dandaa"	Pradeep Raj	Hemanth Kumar, Pradeep Raj	4:46
2.	"Kendhaavara Hoove"	V. Manohar	Nakul Abhyankar	2:43
3.	"Dhamma Dhamma"	V. Manohar	Anuradha Bhat, C. V. Santhosh	4:09
4.	"Dubai Thorsu"	V. Manohar	Chaitra H. G., Tippu	3:53
5.	"Oore Nidire"	V. Manohar	T. V. Krishna	4:01
6.	"Yaaravi"	V. Manohar	C. V. Santhosh	2:14
7.	"Kirik Kirik Kiraathaka"	V. Manohar	Bharath, Chaitra H. G.	1:47

== Critical reception ==
Kirataka received generally positive from critics upon its theatrical release. G. S. Kumar of The Times of India gave the film a rating of 3.5/5 and wrote, "Armed with a good script, Pradeep, in his first venture, has selected a story with a rural background, a rarity in Sandalwood now, and has given it a comical touch with decent narration." and concluded writing, "Yash has done marvellous job as a village boy with excellent dialogue delivery and body language. Ovia is impressive. Tara is gracious. Sanketh Kashi shines in comedy track. Music by V Manohar is melodious while cinematography by R Selvan is good." Shruti Indira Lakshminarayana of Rediff too a 3.5/5 rating to the film and called the film "a breezy entertainer" and praised the role of the plot and the acting department in the film. On the negative aspects, she wrote, "...the film is just too long. Several songs are unnecessary and should have ended up on the cutting floor and not one is likely to make it to the top of the charts." A critic from Bangalore Mirror wrote "The film was a perfect opportunity for Yash to explore a different genre, and he seems to have enjoyed his work to the fullest. Manohar's music and background score never get connected with the film’s pace and theme".

== Box-office ==
Kirataka saw fair success at the box-office and turned out to be Yash's first commercial success. Having completed a run of 50 days in 20 theatres across Karnataka in August 2011, the film completed a 100-day run in Bangalore.
