= Umapathi =

Indian drama film

- Theatrical release poster
- Directed by: Satya Dwarapudi
- Screenplay by: Satya Dwarapudi
- Based on: Kalavani
- Produced by: Konidena Koteswara Rao
- Starring: Anuragh Konidena; Avika Gor
- Cinematography: N N Raghavendra Kumar
- Edited by: Goutham Raju
- Music by: Shakthikanth Karthick
- Production company: Krishi Creations
- Release date: 29 December 2023
- Running time: 148 minutes
- Country: India
- Language: Telugu

Umapathi is an Indian Telugu language drama film directed by Satya Dwarapudi and released in 2023. Produced by Konidena Koteswara Rao under the banner Krishi Creations, the film stars Anuragh Konidena and Avika Gor. The film was theatrically released in India on 1 December 2023. It is a remake of Tamil film Kalavani (2010).

== Plot ==
Vara resides in Dosakayalapalli (district of East Godavari) while his father works in Dubai. Despite his father's struggles, Vara leads a nonchalant life, engaging in trivial activities. His life takes a turn when he moves to Kottapalli and develops an interest in Uma. However, Vara becomes embroiled in a rivalry between the two villages. The plot unfolds as Vara navigates his feelings for Uma amidst the challenges posed by the feuding villages. The resolution to this conflict forms the core of the movie.

== Cast ==
- Anuragh Konidena as Vara Prasad "Vara"
- Avika Gor as Umamaheswari "Uma"
- Ram Prasad as Babji
- Posani Krishna Murali as Panchyathi
- Sivannarayana Naripeddi as Dubai father
- Praveen as Ramu

== Soundtrack ==
The music and background score are composed by Shakthikanth Karthick. Aditya Music secured the rights to the audio.

| No. | Title | Lyrics | Singer(s) | Length |
|---|---|---|---|---|
| 1. | "Butta" | Murthy Devagupthapu | Ravi Kumar Manda, Jayasri Pallem | 4:26 |
| 2. | "Nakokati Nikokat" | Chandrabose (lyricist) | Geetha Madhuri | 4:10 |
| 3. | "Baby Baby" | Bhaskarabhatla | Shakthikanth Karthick | 4:29 |
| 4. | "Bangaram" | Murthy Devagupthapu | N. C. Karunya, Ramya Behara | 4:29 |
| Total length: | | | | 17:34 |

== Reception ==
Suhas Sistu of Hans India gave the film 2.75/5 stars and stated that "UmaPathi emerges as a breath of fresh air in Telugu cinema, seamlessly blending relatable characters and authentic village vibes. With engaging performances, this film promises to make a lasting, positive impression on the audience."

Bhavana Sharma of Deccan Chronicle gave the film 2.5/5 stars and wrote "Umapathi stands out in village love stories with a compelling first half, but occasional repetition is noticeable. The unique climax saves it from predictability, offering a heartfelt tale amidst age-old village feuds."

A Critic from Sakshi TV gave the film 2.5/5 stars and stated that "The director's adept adaptation of a familiar story to our Telugu nativity provides a refreshing experience. The first half excels in portraying the gradual closeness between the lead characters, with a slightly jolting interval setting the stage for the impactful revelations in the compelling second half."

Nelki Naresh Kumar of Hindustan Times gave the film 2.5/5 stars and wrote "Umapati unfolds as a timepass love entertainer, where the storyline and narratives might not break new ground for a typical movie. However, if you're in the mood for comedy, it certainly delivers without any disappointment."

A Critic of Sakshi Post Wrote "Umapathi emerges as a breath of fresh air in the romantic drama genre, boasting stellar performances, engaging dialogues, and top-tier production values. Though occasional lags are present, the film offers an overall positive and enjoyable viewing experience."

A Critic from 10TV gave the film 2.5/5 stars and wrote the "Movie serene backdrop of the countryside, a love story unfolds uniquely, weaving authenticity into the ordinary. Quarrels become the canvas where their rural romance paints a picture of growth, proving that even in simplicity, love finds its extraordinary rhythm.
