= Campus (film) =

- Directed by: Sharvi
- Written by: Sharvi; Ariff; Surya Balan (dialogues)
- Produced by: Peeran; Ariff
- Starring: Sajith Raj; Nitesh; Divya Dwivedi; Sheetal Shah
- Cinematography: R. Selva
- Edited by: B. S. Vasu; Saleem
- Music by: Rajneesh
- Production company: Dreamland Movies
- Release date: 27 February 2004
- Running time: 130 minutes
- Country: India
- Language: Tamil

Campus is a 2004 Tamil language teen film directed by Sharvi, who had previously directed the Malayalam film Gaandhiyan (1999). The film stars newcomers Sajith Raj, Nitesh, Divya Dwivedi and Sheetal Shah, with Sukanya, Anandaraj, Rajan P. Dev, Devan, Manobala, Babu Antony and Vijayan playing supporting roles. The film, produced by Peeran and Ariff, was released on 27 February 2004.

== Plot ==
The storyline revolves around the campus of Model Arts College who had a good reputation in the past. Now, mob violence, eve teasing, vandalism and scantily dressed girls are the norm in the campus as inter-gang rivalry finds expression. Sathya and Rockey are the college leaders who hate each other.

The college administrator R. K. Devaraj and the corrupt minister Sathyaseelan are planning to demolish the college. Sathyaseelan wants to build a powerhouse at that place and makes a profit, but the students have a different opinion and want to save the college. The professor Priya, with a couple of good students, tries to bring back a good reputation to the college. The college student Sheetal has even beaten a college record in an inter-college sports competition. The reputation of the college then has gradually changed, even Sajith Raj and Nitesh have become friends.

Thereafter, Sathyaseelan sends the police and the goons to kick out the students from the college. What transpires next forms the rest of the story.

== Cast ==
- Sajith Raj as Sathya
- Nitesh as Rocky
- Divya Dwivedi as Divya
- Sheetal Shah as Sheetal
- Sukanya as Priya
- Anandaraj
- Rajan P. Dev as Sathyaseelan
- Devan as R. K. Devaraj
- Manobala as Nallathambi
- Babu Antony as Sathya's brother
- Vijayan
- Sethu Vinayagam as B. Sreevallabhan
- Laxmi Rattan as Raj Bhavan
- Bayilvan Ranganathan
- Madhan Bob as Professor
- Muthukaalai as Adhiveeran Pulipandi
- Vimalraj as Samy
- Saju Kodiyan as Professor
- Kottayam Nazeer as Attender
- Maheer Khan
- Kalairani as Student's mother
- Bharathi as Student
- Sujibala as Student
- Cool Jayanth in a special appearance
- Durga Shetty in a special appearance

== Production ==
The college scenes were shot at Church Park School.

== Soundtrack ==
Campus

Soundtrack album by Rajneesh
- Released: 13 February 2004
- Recorded: 2004
- Genre: Feature film soundtrack
- Length: 29:02
- Producer: Rajneesh

The film score and the soundtrack were composed by Rajneesh. The soundtrack, released in 13 February 2004, features 6 tracks with lyrics written by P. Vijay, Snehan, Kalaikumar and Viveka. Two songs were shot in Seoul.

Track	Song	Singer(s)	Duration
1	"Cola Cola"	Yugendran, Srilekha Parthasarathy	5:03
2	"Kunguma Poove"	Yugendran	5:17
3	"Ini Oru Vidhi"	Tippu, Timmy	3:50
4	"Orange Poove"	Karthik, Mathangi Jagdish	5:55
5	"Ahimsaidhaan"	Tippu	3:52
6	"Thodaa Thodaa"	Tippu	5:05

== Reception ==
Sify said, "The film directed by Sharvi is a fluffy entertainer with routine song ‘n’ dance sequences with a wafer-thin plot that is predictable and targeted at the youth". Malini Mannath of Chennai Online opined that "It's Sharvi's (he's directed some Malayalam films) debut film in Tamil, and he would have done better to concentrate on his script, focusing on what exactly he wanted to convey".

Sajith Raj later signed on to play the lead role in Kalakkal, but the film eventually did not release.
