= Oviya =

Indian actress (born 1991)

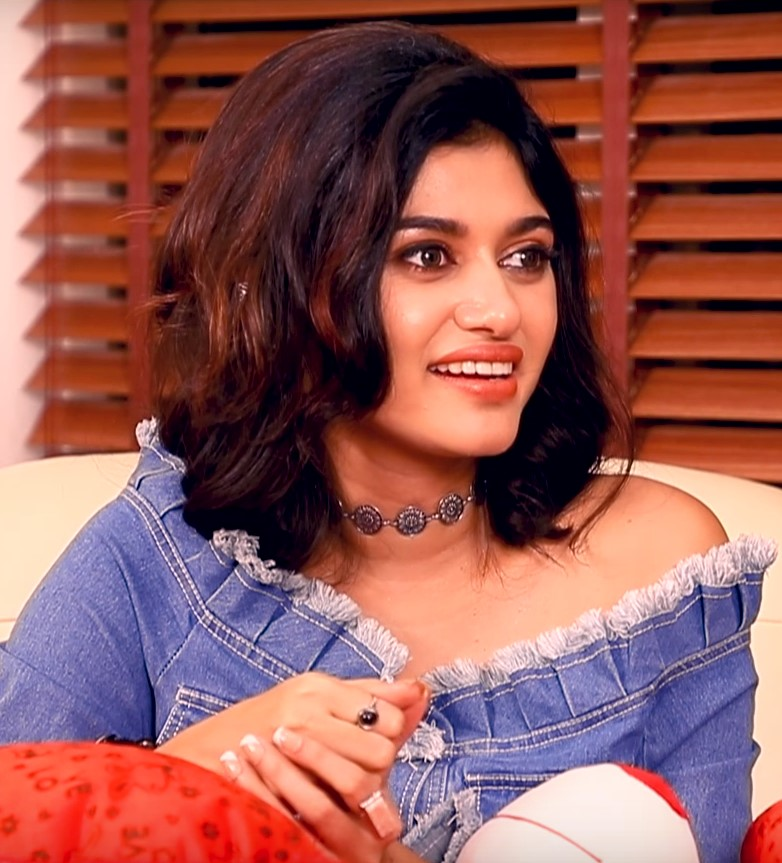
- Oviya in 2018 at Behindwoods YouTube channel for an interview
- Born: Helen Nelson; 29 April 1991 (age 35); Thrissur, Kerala, India
- Education: Vimala College, Thrissur
- Occupations: Actress; model
- Years active: 2007–present
- Known for: Kalavani; Kirataka; Bigg Boss Tamil Season 1

Helen Nelson (born 29 April 1991), better known by her stage name Oviya, is an Indian actress who works in the Tamil and Malayalam films and has also appeared in a few Kannada and Telugu films. She made her breakthrough as an actress in Sarkunam's rural romantic comedy Kalavani (2010), before appearing in other films including Pandiraj's Marina (2012), Moodar Koodam (2013) and Madha Yaanai Koottam (2013). Oviya has also enjoyed box office success through her roles in Sundar C's Kalakalappu (2012) and the horror comedy Yaamirukka Bayamey (2014). In 2017, Oviya appeared on the reality series Bigg Boss Tamil 1.

== Early life ==
Oviya was born as Helen Nelson at Thrissur, Kerala, and studied at Vimala College.

== Career ==
=== Debut in Malayalam cinema (2007–2009) ===
Oviya began her acting career by portraying supporting roles in Malayalam films, notably working in Kangaroo (2007) and Puthiya Mukham (2009) and as a lead character in the college drama Apoorva (2008). Oviya then worked towards completing a BA in Functional English at Vimala College in Thrissur, before director Sargunam approached her for Kalavani (2010). Sarkunam cast her in the leading female role after seeing a picture of her online and was convinced that he had found the right actress to portray the role despite reservations from the producer.

=== Debut in Tamil cinema (2010-2016) ===
In Kalavani, she was cast opposite Vimal; the film gained positive reviews and became a sleeper hit at the box office. Critics praised Oviya's performance of a village-based schoolgirl, with a critic from the Hindustan Times stating "Oviya's marvellous expressions convey her gratitude, and she uses her eyes to say it all". Similarly, a reviewer from The Hindu stated "Oviya looks cute and emotes well, which is a rarity these days".

Following the success of Kalavani, Oviya signed several small-budget films including Jeevan's Amara, Vengai, Mugam Nee Agam Naan, Sevanu and Rasu Madhuravan's Muthukku Muthaaga (2011), but only the latter had a theatrical release. While several films were stopped due to financial reasons, Oviya had to opt out of a few films after inadvertently muddling her dates. Portraying the role of a college basketballer in Muthukku Muthaaga, Oviya worked through the pain barrier for the film after fainting on the sets following an illness. The film, however, opened to negative reviews with a critic from Behindwoods.com stating Oviya's character was "annoying". During the period, she was also seen in two further Malayalam films Puthumukhangal (2010) and Manushyamrugam (2011), despite making claims that Malayalam films were "uninteresting and boring". The Kannada remake of Kalavani titled Kirataka (2011) won Oviya more critical acclaim, with a reviewer from Rediff.com stating she "charms her way through the film", though a proposed Telugu remake later fell through. Oviya was also seen in a guest appearance in K. S. Ravikumar's romantic comedy, Manmadhan Ambu (2010), where she featured alongside Kamal Haasan and Madhavan. Post-release, the actress revealed that she appreciated the opportunity to work alongside big actors but was disappointed that several of her scenes were edited out of the film.

Over the following three years, Oviya prioritised her work in Tamil films appearing in several small and mid-budget projects and alternated between performance-based and glamorous roles. In Pandiraj's critically acclaimed drama film Marina (2012), Oviya and her co-star debutant Sivakarthikeyan portrayed a couple who frequent Marina Beach, with a critic describing their performance as "absolutely enjoyable and hilarious". Likewise, the black comedy Moodar Koodam (2014) and the thriller Madha Yaanai Koottam (2014) also featured Oviya in performance-based roles and both won critical acclaim. She portrayed a glamorous role for the first time in Sundar C's comedy Kalakalappu (2012), where she worked alongside a star cast of Shiva, Vimal and Anjali. The film opened to positive reviews and performed well at the box office, becoming her most profitable film to date. Following further glamorous roles in unsuccessful films such as Sillunu Oru Sandhippu (2013) and Pulivaal (2014), Oviya scored another success with her role as a dainty, hot girl in Deekay's horror comedy Yaamirukka Bayamey (2014). Critics also praised her performance, with a reviewer from the Deccan Chronicle stating "as the girl-next-door-unafraid-of-her-sexuality, Oviya is perfect".

Oviya's acting career began to decline after 2014 and she was primarily offered glamorous roles in low-profile films. She was cast opposite veteran actor Sarathkumar in the unsuccessful Sandamarutham (2015) which garnered negative reviews, while her subsequent Tamil films, C. V. Kumar's heist comedy 144 (2015) and Sundar C's horror comedy Hello Naan Pei Pesuren (2016) did not perform as well as anticipated at the box office. Another project, the female-centric Bhogi co-starring Trisha and Poonam Bajwa, was also stalled despite the shoot progressing. She subsequently moved on to portray a role in the low-budget Hindi film Yeh Ishq Sarfira (2015) and then the leading role of a city girl in the Kannada film, Mr. Mommaga (2016).

=== Bigg Boss Tamil (2017–2018) ===
In 2017, Oviya took part in the Tamil reality television show Bigg Boss hosted by Kamal Haasan for the Star Vijay channel. Oviya gained instant popularity on the show through her charm and honesty, in comparison to other housemates. While enjoying friendship with contestants Bindu Madhavi, Raiza Wilson, Ganesh Venkatraman, and a cordial and one-sided romantic relationship with season winner Arav, she was repeatedly targeted and bullied by other housemates including Gayathri Raghuram, Namitha, Juliana and Shakthi Vasudevan. Her clever responses and positive attitude to the bullying won over audiences. Voters repeatedly kept her in the show despite her being up for eviction at multiple instances, while she garnered a "cult following" on social media with phrases such as "Oviya Army" regularly trending. Her behaviour and positive attitude on the show also attracted other celebrities to tweet in appreciation of her, with the likes of Priya Anand, Nivetha Pethuraj, Sathish and Karunakaran amongst others praising her on social media. The popularity of Oviya reached such a high in late July 2017 that the makers of an unrelated Tamil film, Balloon (2017), included a song titled "Neenga Shut Up Pannunga" and dedicated it to the actress. Likewise, several other songwriters created their own "Oviya Anthems" and released them online.

In early August 2017, Oviya quit the show on medical grounds, following a week-long spat with Arav regarding her one-sided romantic feelings for him. Prior to her exit, she deliberately jumped into the swimming pool to force her departure, prompting the police to briefly investigate a potential suicide angle to the move. Despite widespread calls on social media for her to return to the show as a wildcard entrant, Oviya released a video confirming that she had no interest in going back into the Bigg Boss House and would take an extended break and prioritise film opportunities. She also called for the public to forgive Shakthi and Julie for their behaviour towards her on the show.

=== 2019- present ===
Her acting career also saw positive developments following her stint on the show and her subsequent popularity. A long-delayed, small-budget film titled Seeni was renamed to Oviyaava Vitta Yaaru to cash in on the actress's newfound fan following. Likewise, her Malayalam film Manushyamrugam from 2012, was dubbed into Tamil and prepared for release under the title Police Rajyam. Filmmakers including Sundar C, C. S. Amudhan and Santhosh Jayakumar announced their interest in signing the actress for roles in their film Kalakalappu 2, Tamil Padam 2 and Iruttu Araiyil Murattu Kuththu, but she turned down the offers. Post her Bigg Boss-fame, she signed on to appear in the Muni 4: Kanchana 3 by Raghava Lawrence, with critics quoting her role “as not making any difference to the film”. She appeared in a sequel to her breakthrough film, Kalavani, titled Kalavani 2 and the female-orientated, controversial script, 90ML, both releasing to negative reviews and poor box office collections. After a two-year hiatus, Oviya is currently acting with Yogi Babu in an upcoming comedy entertainer titled Contractor Nesamani.

== Filmography ==
=== Filmography ===
†	Denotes films that have not yet been released

Year	Film	Role	Language	Notes
2007	Kangaroo	Susanna	Malayalam	Malayalam debut
2008	Apoorva	Pooja	Malayalam	
2009	Puthiya Mukham	Meera	Malayalam	
2009	Naalai Namadhe	Aishwarya	Tamil	Tamil Debut
2010	Kalavani	Maheswari	Tamil	
2010	Manmadan Ambu	Sunanda	Tamil	
2010	Puthumukhangal	Varsha	Malayalam	
2011	Muthukku Muthaaga	Shwetha	Tamil	
2011	Kirataka	Nethra	Kannada	Kannada Debut; Remake of Kalavani
2011	Manushyamrugam	Sophie	Malayalam	
2012	Marina	Sopnasundari	Tamil	
2012	Kalakalappu	Maya	Tamil	
2013	Sillunu Oru Sandhippu	Geetha	Tamil	
2013	Moodar Koodam	Karpagavalli	Tamil	
2013	Madha Yaanai Koottam	Ritu	Tamil	
2014	Pulivaal	Monica	Tamil	
2014	Yaamirukka Bayamey	Sharanya	Tamil	
2015	Sandamarutham	Minmini (Rekha)	Tamil	
2015	Yeh Ishq Sarfira	Riya	Hindi	Hindi debut
2015	144	Kalyani	Tamil	
2016	Hello Naan Pei Pesuren	Sridevi	Tamil	
2016	Mr. Mommaga	Ramya	Kannada	
2018	Idi Naa Love Story	Abhinaya	Telugu	Telugu Debut
2018	Silukkuvarupatti Singam	Kanaka	Tamil	Cameo appearance
2019	90ML	Rita	Tamil	Also co-sang "Marana Matta"
2019	Ganesha Meendum Santhipom	Keerthi	Tamil	
2019	Muni 4: Kanchana 3	Kavya	Tamil	
2019	Oviyavai Vitta Yaru	Oviya	Tamil	
2019	Kalavani 2	Maheswari	Tamil	
2021	Black Coffee	Malu	Malayalam	
2024	Boomer Uncle	Oviya	Tamil	
2025	Rajabheema		Tamil	Cameo appearance
TBA	Sambhavam †	TBA	Tamil	Filming

== Television ==
Year	Title	Role	Notes
2011	Neengalum Vellalam Oru Kodi	Contestant	Game reality show
2017	Bigg Boss Tamil (season 1)	Contestant	Reality TV Series; Walked Day 41
2018	Bigg Boss Tamil (season 2)	Guest	Reality TV Series
2021	Merlin	Merlin	Web Series
2026	Bigg Boss – The Common Man	Judge	Reality show

== Discography ==
=== Songs ===
Year	Song	Album	Composer	Lyricist	Other artist(s)	Notes	Ref.
2017	"Marana Matta"	90 ML	Silambarasan	Shabareesh Varma	Silambarasan, Harish Kalyan	Debut	

== Awards and nominations ==
Year	Award	Category	Film	Result
2010	5th Vijay Awards	Best Debut Actress	Kalavani	Nominated
2012	Edison Awards	Best Rising Star Female	Kalakalappu	Won
