= Malligadu Marriage Bureau =

- Official poster
- Directed by: Uday Raj
- Produced by: Mallela Seetaramaraju
- Starring: Srikanth; Manochitra
- Cinematography: Vasu
- Edited by: Aswani Kumar
- Music by: Raghu Ram
- Release date: 7 February 2014
- Country: India
- Language: Telugu

Malligadu Marriage Bureau is a 2014 Indian Telugu-language comedy film directed by Uday Raj and starring Srikanth and Manochitra. This film is about Malli, a man who creates a marriage bureau.

== Cast ==
- Srikanth as Malligadu a.k.a. Malli
- Manochitra as Madhu
- Brahmanandam as Chotu Bhai
- Posani Krishna Murali as ACP Nayak
- Telangana Shakuntala as Akka
- Vennela Kishore as Bobby
- Anjana as Surekha
- Sravanthi Ravi Kishore
- Fish Venkat
- Nandhu

== Production ==
After his previous action-oriented films were commercial failures, Srikanth decided to do an out-and-out comedy film. Tamil actress Manochitra made her Telugu debut with this film. She worked on this film alongside Nattukodi, another film starring Srikanth which is yet to release.

== Soundtrack ==
Music by Raghu Ram.

- "Marriages Are Made In Heaven" – Ranjiith
- "Kanti Reppa Kottesukunde" – Vedala Hemachandra, Geetha Madhuri
- "Okkasari Oppuko" – Raghu Ram
- "Nallani Katuka" – Dinker, Pranavi

== Reception ==
Ch. Sushil Rao of The Times of India said that "Over all, it is a fun movie but for the cinematography. It does not give you the feel that you are watching the big picture. Srikanth slips into his role well and the comedy most of the times is not lost on the audience". A critic from The Hans India opined that "The movie is not unique, but a good family entertainer. Srikanth with his stupendous performance dominated all other characters in the movie". Ravi Kandala of Full Hyderabad said that "Malligadu will be forgotten soon, and will surely become a staple on Gemini Movies, that re-runner of mediocre films. You can safely stay away".
