= Aval Peyar Thamizharasi =

- Theatrical release poster
- Directed by: Meera Kathiravan
- Written by: Meera Kathiravan
- Starring: Jai; Nandhagi
- Cinematography: P. G. Muthiah
- Edited by: Raja Mohammad
- Music by: Vijay Antony
- Production companies: Blue Ocean Entertainment; Moser Baer
- Release date: 5 March 2010
- Country: India
- Language: Tamil

Aval Peyar Thamizharasi (transl. Her name is Thamizharasi) is a 2010 Indian Tamil-language drama film written and directed by Meera Kathiravan. The film stars Jai, Manochitra (credited as Nandhagi and as the title character), Dhiyana, S. Theodore Baskaran and Ganja Karuppu in lead roles. The music was composed by Vijay Antony with cinematography by P. G. Muthiah and editing by Raja Mohammad. The film premiered in December 2009 at the 6th Dubai International Film Festival, had its theatrical release on 5 March 2010, and failed at the box office.

== Plot ==
Siva Rao is a Thol Pavai puppeteer who, along with his family, travels from village to village, performing to make ends meet. Their fortunes change when they arrive in Tirunelveli, where a wealthy man named Chelladurai decides to support them because his young grandson Jyothi is fond of their art. Thamizharasi, Siva Rao's granddaughter, attends a local school and excels academically, eventually gaining admission to an engineering college in Pune.

During this time, Jyothi and Thamizharasi develop a close bond. However, tragedy strikes when Jyothi rapes Thamizharasi, altering her life forever. In response, Jyothi is sent away from the village by his grandfather to live with his father. Years later, Jyothi returns, seeking forgiveness and searching for Thamizharasi, who has disappeared. The story follows Jyothi's journey as he attempts to reconcile with Thamizharasi and atone for his past actions.

== Cast ==
- Jai as Jyothi Murugan
- Nandhagi as Thamizharasi
- S. Theodore Baskaran as Chelladurai
- Veera Santhanam as Siva Rao
- Ganja Karuppu as Othappuli
- Dhiyana as Dancer
- Rama as Thamizharasi's mother
- S. S. Kumaran as Kuthoospandiraj

== Production ==
Manochitra was cast as the lead actress after the director Meera Kathiravan met her at the Kanchopuram Kamakshi temple. The director asked her to avoid interviews and abstain from the film's promotions to maintain the suspense of her identity till the audio launch. She was credited as Nandhagi.

== Soundtrack ==
The soundtrack was composed by Vijay Antony. The audio launch event was held in early November 2009. Pavithra Srinivasan of Rediff.com wrote, "It looks like Vijay Antony is trying to break the mould of get-tunes-quick fixes and making genuine in-roads into a collection that tries to explore every facet of the musical spectrum. He might not have turned out a scintillating album yet, but despite a few familiar refrains, this one promises some endearing numbers". Karthik of Milliblog wrote, "Vijay wasn't expected to produce a blockbuster, but this soundtrack is disappointing given the strides he had taken recently".

Track listing
No.	Title	Lyrics	Singer(s)	Length
1.	"Nee Otha Sollu Sollu"	Ekadasi	Ranjith, Neetha	4:49
2.	"Chikku Chikku Goods Vandi"	Ekadasi	Nancy, Silviya & Chorus	3:58
3.	"Vadakka Therkka"	Ekadasi	Vineeth Sreenivasan	4:01
4.	"Paalayan Kottai"	Na. Muthukumar	Vijay Antony	4:01
5.	"Kel Tanaa Rangubhai"	Eknath	Malgudi Subha	3:54
6.	"Yethanaiyo Katha Undu"	Ekadasi	Srimathumitha, Mahalakshmi & Chorus	4:22
7.	"Othayadi Paadhai"	Rama Thiruvudaiyaan	Valappakkudi Veera Shankar	2:36
8.	"Maadathila Oli Vilaka"	Rama Thiruvudaiyaan	Valappakkudi Veera Shankar	3:36
9.	"Aararo Aariraro"	Rama Thiruvudaiyaan	Valappakkudi Veera Shankar	6:36
Total length:				37:53

== Release ==
Aval Peyar Thamizharasi was screened at the 6th Dubai International Film Festival in December 2009. It was cleared in the same month by the censor board with a U/A certificate without cuts. The producers initially hoped to release the film theatrically in February 2010 during the Valentine's Day weekend, but it was released on 5 March 2010, clashing with Thambikku Indha Ooru and Veerasekaran. The film was released worldwide with 100 prints, with 93 alone in Tamil Nadu, which the media proclaimed was the highest for a film starring Jai as the sole lead actor. The media also felt it had the potential to outperform the competing films due to aggressive marketing by its producers, whereas the other films suffered from poor publicity and could not secure as many screens. However, the film failed at the box office.

== Critical reception ==
Gautaman Bhaskaran of Hindustan Times wrote, "Kathiravan's effort must be lauded because he is still one of the few helmers in cinema bold enough to take his camera to the countryside and capture the dying wails of India's glorious heritage". Sify wrote, "Well-intentioned in his attempts to make good cinema, Meera Kathiravan and producers Moserbaer and Blue Ocean deserve a pat on their backs for crafting a movie that will stay in your hearts . It is a welcome change from the usual mass masalas and need to be seen in that perceptive".

Bhama Devi Ravi of The Times of India wrote, "Where the film falters is the second half, with very wooden performances from the lead pair, which is more the director's failure, since he fails to engage a strong emotional connect between the pair which was visible in Paruthi Veeran and Poo. However, he must be commended for the attempt at a near-classic film". Pavithra Srinivasan of Rediff.com wrote, "Director Meera Kadhiravan shows that he has a flair for comedy, a fierce loyalty for our art-forms and a genuine liking for logic. If he'd taken care at tightening his script, this would have been a cult classic".
