= Enakku Veru Engum Kilaigal Kidayathu =

2016 Indian film by Ganapathy Balamurugan

- Directed by: Ganapathy Balamurugan
- Produced by: Jayaram
- Starring: Goundamani; Soundararaja; Riythvika
- Music by: S. N. Arunagiri
- Production company: Jayaram Productions
- Distributed by: MSK Film Production (Overseas)
- Release date: 26 August 2016
- Country: India

Enakku Veru Engum Kilaigal Kidayathu (transl. I don't have any other branches) is a 2016 Indian Tamil-language comedy film written and directed by Ganapathy Balamurugan. The film stars Goundamani, with Soundararaja and Riythvika. Featuring music composed by S. N. Arunagiri, the film began production during June 2016, and was released on 26 August 2016.

== Cast ==
- Goundamani as Caravan Krishnan
- Soundararaja as Prabha
- Riythvika as Divya
- Shanoor Sana as Caravan Krishna's Wife
- Munnar Ramesh as Divya's Father
- Vallavan
- Vasagar
- Ramachandran Durairaj
- Velmurugan
- D. Kannan
- Master B. Girishwar
- Master B. Kamaleshwar

== Production ==
In January 2015, Goundamani accepted terms to work on a film titled Enakku Veru Engum Kilaigal Kidayathu directed by Ganapathy Balamurugan. Along with 49-O (2015) and Vaaimai, the film marked the return of Goundamani to films after a long sabbatical. Goundamani had initially expressed reservations about the film's title, stating it sounded too pompous, but the director convinced him that the title would be apt for the script. Despite beginning shoot in early 2015, the film's release was delayed by over a year. Later the film was released in August 2016 and gained mixed reviews.
