= Kalavani =

2010 film by A. Sarkunam

- Promotional poster
- Directed by: A. Sarkunam
- Written by: A. Sarkunam
- Produced by: Nazir
- Starring: Vimal; Oviya
- Cinematography: Om Prakash
- Edited by: Raja Mohammad
- Music by: S. S. Kumaran
- Production company: Sherali Films
- Distributed by: Ayngaran International
- Release date: 25 June 2010
- Country: India
- Language: Tamil
- Budget: ₹1.5 crore (equivalent to ₹3.4 crore or US$350,000 in 2023)
- Box office: ₹5 crore (equivalent to ₹11 crore or US$1.2 million in 2023)

Kalavani (transl. Thief) is a 2010 Indian Tamil-language romantic comedy film written and directed by newcomer A. Sarkunam. It stars Vimal and debutante Oviya, with Saranya Ponvannan, Ilavarasu, Ganja Karuppu, and Soori in supporting roles. The music was composed by S. S. Kumaran, with cinematography by Om Prakash and editing by Raja Mohammad.

The film was made on a shoestring budget, and released on 25 June 2010. It became a sleeper hit. The film was remade in Kannada as Kirataka (2011) with Oviya reprising her role and in Telugu as Umapathi (2023). A sequel, Kalavani 2, also directed by Sarkunam, with Vimal and Oviya reprising their roles, was released in 2019.

== Plot ==
Two villages in Thanjavur are always at loggerheads with each other. Their animosity spills even to a T20 cricket match between kids from both villages. Arivazhagan aka Arikki is a wayward son of Lakshmi, who is in awe but at the same time fears him. Her husband Ramasamy is away in Dubai, and a large part of the money he sends home is taken away by Arikki using extortionist methods, such as threatening to break the TV set at home. He is yet to pass his 12th standard. Arikki spends time in bars with friends, teases girls, asks them to profess their love for him, and gets into brawls after conning others. He meets Maheshwari and wants her to declare her love for him, which she finally confesses. He abducts her, and they eventually marry. Her brother Ilango is a tough guy who has an axe to grind against Arikki and his gang, which leads to the twist in the climax. Ilango, fuming with rage, is out to slice Arikki into pieces. What transpires is an interesting climax that is pleasantly humorous.

== Cast ==
- Vimal as Arivazhagan (Arikki)
- Oviya as Maheshwari (Mahesh)
- Saranya Ponvannan as Lakshmi
- Ilavarasu as Ramasamy
- Ganja Karuppu as Panchayathu
- Soori as Manikandan
- Thirumurugan as Ilango
- Sujatha Sivakumar as Rajee
- Aswatha
- Mu Ramaswamy as Maheshwari's elder paternal uncle
- Thavasi
- Antony as Arikki's friend
- Kannan as Florist
- Kalai Arasan
- Manisha Priyadarshini as Raji, Arikki's sister

== Production ==
A. Sarkunam approached K. Bhagyaraj with his script, and asked for help in improving the script and for Bhagayraj's son Shanthanu to play the lead role. Sarkunam later moved away from Bhagyaraj, citing that his producer was uncomfortable with the potential salary that Shanthanu may have expected. The film was prominently shot in Thanjavur.

== Soundtrack ==
The film score and soundtrack for Kalavani was composed by S. S. Kumaran. The album consists of seven tracks featuring lyrics penned by Na. Muthukumar. The song "Oru Murai" was well received and was retained in the Kannada remake.

Song title	Singers
"Oru Murai Iru Murai"	Harish Raghavendra, Srimathumitha
"Pada Pada Padavena"	Yash Golcha
"Peancha Mazhai"	A. Devendran
"Sinthaiyiley"	Prasanna
"Dubaikku"	Ranjith, Uma
"Ooradangum Samathiley"	Senthilvelan
"Edakku Madakku"	S.S.Kumaran

== Critical reception ==
Bhama Devi Ravi from The Times of India gave 4/5 and calling it "a complete entertainer." Sify rated the film 4 out of 5 and stated that "Kalavani is a knockout entertainer set in a rural milieu." A critic from Top10Cinema wrote that "Kalavani is a blatant revision of Bharathiraja's yesteryear films based on villager's conflicts and guy-gal falling in love." Gautaman Bhaskaran of Hindustan Times gave it 3/5 and wrote that "Kalavani is a canvas of delightful rural romance."

== Sequels and remakes ==
Following the success of Kalavani, Gautham Vasudev Menon's Photon Kathaas acquired the rights to remake it in other languages. It was remade in Kannada as Kirataka (2011) with Oviya being retained as the female lead. It was also remade in Telugu as Umapathi (2023). A sequel, Kalavani 2, again directed by Sarkunam with Vimal and Oviya reprising their roles, was released in 2019.

== Litigation ==
Seven years after the film's release, the Chennai branch of the Central Board of Film Certification (CBFC) was served a notice by the Madras High Court after a minor pregnant girl told the court that she obtained inspiration from Kalavani. The girl's parents claimed that the board had acted negligently in giving the film a U (unrestricted) certificate. Sarkunam, when questioned by the media about the issue, called it "completely unnecessary" to blame the film, and refused to comment further.
