= Ammuvagiya Naan =

- Poster
- Directed by: Padmamagan
- Written by: Padmamagan
- Produced by: Srinivash Reddy
- Starring: R. Parthiban; Bharathi
- Cinematography: M. S. Prabhu
- Edited by: Suresh Urs
- Music by: Sabesh–Murali
- Distributed by: Parker Brothers
- Release date: 2 September 2007
- Running time: 122 minutes
- Country: India
- Language: Tamil

Ammuvagiya Naan (transl. I, Ammu) is a 2007 Indian Tamil-language drama film directed by Padmamagan, starring R. Parthiban and Bharathi. The music was compose by Sabesh–Murali. The film released in September 2007 and became a hit.

== Plot ==
The film revolves around Ammu (Bharathi), an orphan brought up in a prostitute's house. Brought up in such atmosphere, she develops a fascination for the world's oldest profession. She comes across a writer Gowrishankar (R. Parthiepan), who comes to her place to pen a novel on the life of a commercial sex worker. Her childlike innocence wins over Gowrishankar's heart. He decides to marry her. Gowrishankar's love and care brings a change in Ammu. She understands the value of family and the bond of togetherness. Gowrishankar completes his novel Ammuvagya Naan and hopes for a national award for it. Fate pays a cruel act in the form of a president of a literary association (Mahadevan). He bargains for a night with Ammu to ensure the national award for Amuvagiya Naan. Eventually, Ammu kills the president.

== Cast ==
- R. Parthiban as Gowrishankar
- Bharathi as Ammu
- Mahadevan as Nathan, Literary Association President
- Sadhana as Rani
- Ragasudha as Malli
- Thennavan as Mohan
- Abhishek Shankar as Raghu
- Shanthi Williams as Gowrishankar's sister
- Suja Varunee as Special appearance

== Production ==
This was the second directorial of Padmamagan after Pallavan (2003). The filming was held at Chennai, Pondicherry and Senji fort.

== Soundtrack ==
Soundtrack was composed by Sabesh–Murali.

Song	Singer(s)	Duration
"Kadale Kadale" (F)	Mathangi Jagdish	4:30
"Kadale Kadale" (M)	Sabesh Murali	4:32
"Silir Silir"	Srilekha Parthasarathy	5:01
"Unnai Saranadainthen"	Harish Raghavendra, Kalyani	4:19
"Thoranam Aayiram"	Srividya	4:24

== Critical reception ==
Kollywood Today wrote "As a whole, Ammuvaagiya Naan is a film that has attempted to can a bold theme with different approach and thank god, there are no unwanted commercial elements present here." Chennai Online wrote "'Ammu...' is a film, which, despite its flaws, and its fairy tale look at the not-so-pleasant world of sex workers, is refreshingly different and worth a watch". Mu. Maran of Kalki appreciated the acting of Parthiban, Bharathi and other actors, cinematography, dialogues and background score and concluded saying slow screenplay, not so memorable songs, some of the scenes which could have handled decently despite the necessity for the film are some of the flaws, in the midst of action films, Ammuvagiya Naan is a wonderful Tamil cinema. Malini Mannath of Chennai Online wrote "'Ammu...' is a film, which, despite its flaws, and its fairy tale look at the not-so-pleasant world of sex workers, is refreshingly different and worth a watch".
