= Mahasenha =

2025 Tamil-language film

- Theatrical release poster
- Directed by: Dhinesh Kalaiselvan
- Written by: Dhinesh Kalaiselvan
- Starring: Vimal; Yogi Babu; Srushti Dange; Kabir Duhan Singh
- Cinematography: Manas Babhu D. R.
- Edited by: Nagooran Ramachandran
- Music by: Uday Prakash UPR (Background); A. Praveen Kumar (Soundtrack)
- Production company: Marudham Productions
- Distributed by: PVR Inox Pictures
- Release date: 12 December 2025
- Country: India
- Language: Tamil

Mahasenha also marketed as Mahasenha Volume - 1 is a 2025 Indian Tamil-language action thriller film written and directed by Dhinesh Kalaiselvan starring Vimal, Srushti Dange and Kabir Duhan Singh in the lead roles. The film is produced by Dhinesh Kalaiselvan under his Marudham Productions banner.

Mahasenha was released in theatres on 12 December 2025 to negative reviews.

== Plot ==
The story opens with the people of a village warding off a hostile section that was out to steal their deity. The narrative travels on multiple tracks. On one is Senguttavan a youngster who is preparing for the impending village festival. His elephant going missing, he ventures into the forest in search of it. On another track are a set of college students under professor Kamaraj, who are on a trekking expedition to take part in the village festival And on a third track is Prathap a corrupt greedy forest official and his misdeeds. It's what happens when the tracks merge.

== Cast ==
- Vimal as Senguttuvan
- Srushti Dange as Bommi
- Kabir Duhan Singh as King of God
- Yogi Babu as Suruli
- John Vijay as Forest officer Prathap
- Mahima Gupta as Ganga
- Vijay Siyon as Idumban
- Alfred Jose as Professor Kamaraj
- Shubhangi

== Production ==
Raakadhan (2023) fame Dhinesh Kalaiselvan announced his sophomore project, collaborating with Vimal for an action film titled Mahasenha Volume - 1, with plans of developing it into a multi-part project, consisting of three or four volumes. The film is produced by Dhinesh Kalaiselvan under his Marudham Productions banner and the technical team consists of cinematographer Manas Babhu D. R., editor Nagooran Ramachandran, and action choreographer Ram Kumar. Filming of Vimal's portions with an elephant was entirely shot in Kerala. The fim stars Srushti Dange as the female lead. Apart from the lead cast, the film also features Srushti Dange, Kabir Duhan Singh, Yogi Babu, John Vijay, Mahima Gupta, and others in important roles.

== Music ==
The film has soundtracks composed by A. Praveen Kumar and background scored by Uday Prakash UPR. The pre-release audio launch event was conducted at Prasad Labs on 30 November 2025.

== Release ==
Mahasenha was released in theatres on 12 December 2025. Apart from the original Tamil language, the film is also planned to release in the dubbed versions of Kannada, Telugu, Malayalam and Hindi languages.

== Reception ==
Dinamalar rated the film with 2/5 stars. A critic from Maalai Malar rated the film 1.5/5 stars, criticising its illogical sequences and incoherent screenplay.

Abhinav Subramanian of Times of India gave 1.5/5 stars and wrote "Mahasenha drapes itself in mythology and ritual like that's supposed to compensate for having no actual story. Gods, curses, sacred statues... none of it registers because the religiosity just sits there, heavy and inert. The problem isn't even that it fails to earn reverence. [...] Two hours and fifteen minutes feel like penance for a sin you didn't commit. The film limps from one lifeless scene to the next with characters spouting platitudes." Akshay Kumar of Cinema Express rated the film 1/5 stars and wrote, "The film has a leaky plot with large chunks of inconsequential sequences. [...] The incoherence in the transition between scenes is so jarring that you would start wondering if you are even watching a completed movie."
