= Padmamagan =

Indian film director

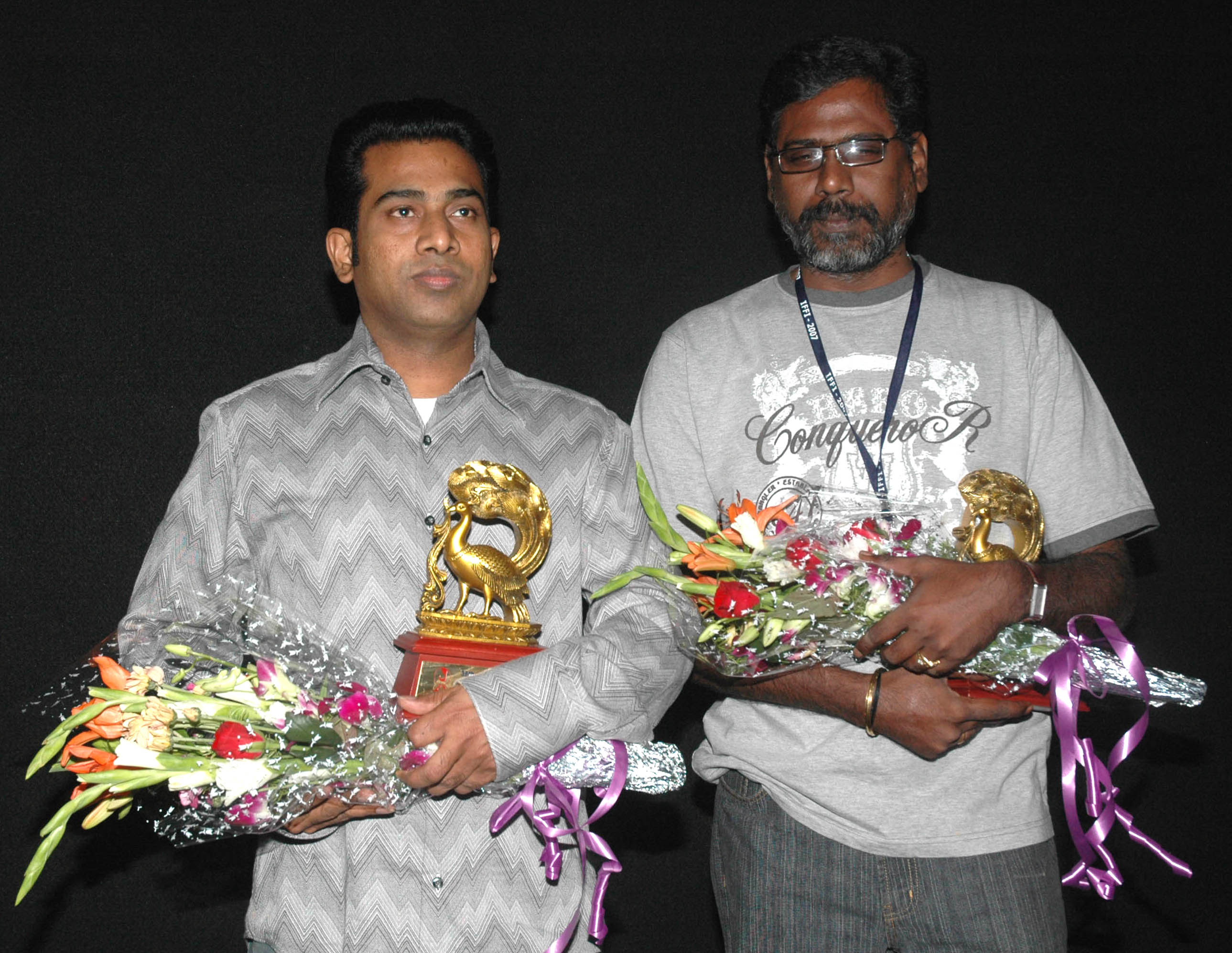
- Padmamagan (right), IFFI (2007)
- Born: Tamil Nadu, India
- Occupation: Film director
- Years active: 2003–present
- Spouse: Malathy

Padmamagan is an Indian film director, who has directed Tamil films. After making his debut in 2003 with Pallavan, he has gone on to make other ventures including Ammuvagiya Naan and Netru Indru.

== Career ==
Padmamagan associated with producer Rufus Parker and the duo chose to make a commercial film to begin their film careers; Pallavan (2003) released with little publicity and did not perform well at the box office. With Parker, he then began work on Ammuvagiya Naan (2007), which told the story of a commercial sex worker transforming herself into a housewife. Starring Parthiban and Bharathi, the film opened to positive reviews with a critic noting "writer-director Padma Magan has come out with a movie that augers well for the future of Tamil Cinema". The film was later screened at the 2007 International Film Festival of India in Goa, becoming the first Tamil venture since Nayakan (1987) to achieve such a feat. Despite the success of the film, Padmamagan failed to get producers for his next planned project, that revolving around the life of a seven-year-old child. He revealed that such failure to attract investors, made him give up a career in cinema and turned him into an alcoholic.

In 2012, he began work on his third film Netru Indru, a multi-starrer featuring Vimal, Prasanna and Richard amongst other actors. He produced the venture himself, alongside his wife Malathy, and revealed that it would be a socially relevant movie. The film had a low-key release in 2014 after several delays. In 2015, he began work on a project titled Boomi.

== Filmography ==
Year	Film	Credited as		Notes
Year	Film	Director	Writer	Notes
2002	Style	No	Dialogues	
2003	Pallavan	Yes	Yes	
2007	Ammuvagiya Naan	Yes	Yes	
2014	Netru Indru	Yes	Yes	
