= Kanni Raasi =

2020 Indian film by Muthukumaran

- Film poster
- Directed by: Muthukumaran
- Produced by: Shameem Ibraham
- Starring: Vimal; Varalaxmi Sarathkumar
- Cinematography: S. Selvakumar
- Edited by: Raja Mohammad
- Music by: Vishal Chandrasekhar
- Production company: King Movie Makers
- Release date: 4 December 2020
- Running time: 133 min
- Country: India
- Language: Tamil

Kanni Raasi (transl. Virgo) is a 2020 Indian Tamil-language romantic comedy film directed by Muthukumaran and produced by Shameem Ibraham. The film stars Vimal and Varalaxmi Sarathkumar, with Pandiarajan, Yogi Babu, Kaali Venkat and Robo Shankar amongst others in supporting roles.

== Plot ==
The film is about the protagonist's aversion to a love marriage, that is not shared by the heroine, his neighbour.

== Cast ==
- Vimal as Gemini Ganesan
- Varalaxmi Sarathkumar as Anjali
- Pandiarajan as Thiruvengadam
- Yogi Babu as Vairamani
- Robo Shankar as Manmadhan
- Kaali Venkat as Jaishankar
- Chaams as Ambur Ram Iyer
- Bava Lakshmanan as Head Constable
- Valavan as Sengottai Perumal
- Lollu Sabha Manohar as Swamy
- P. V. Chandramouli as DSP Ukkira Pandian. Anjali's father
- Charmila as Lakshmi
- Shakeela as Chechi
- Porali Dileepan as Sathasivam
  - Bhanumathi as Fathima Sathasivam
- Jayachandran as Saravanan
  - Sowmiya as Saravanan's Wife
- Arputhan Vijayan as Shanmugam
  - Prithvi as Rosy Shanmugam
- Sabbita Roi as Sumathi
- Lakshmi Priya Menon as Anjali's mother
- Scissor Manohar as Marriage Broker Ramadoss
- Kadhal Saravanan as Dhobi
- Nanjil Vijayan as Vairamani's sidekick
- Anisha Seena as a bride
- Arundhati Nair in a special appearance
  - Shouryadan Reddy Gadhe in a special appearance

== Production ==
In November 2015, it was reported that actor Jiiva would work with newcomer Muthukumar for a romantic comedy film titled Gemini Ganesan. P. T. Selvakumar and Shibu Thameens were announced as the film's producers, but the project was later dropped.

The film was revived with a new producer in June 2017 and Vimal was cast to play the male lead, and Varalaxmi Sarathkumar was signed on to play the female lead. The makers reportedly chose to change the films title to Kadhal Mannan (transl. King of Romance), In January 2018, after a major portion of the shoot was completed, the team announced the film was titled Kanni Raasi.

== Soundtrack ==
Soundtrack was composed by Vishal Chandrashekhar.

- Un Kitta Ennamo Irukku – Sathya Prakash & Kalyaninair
- Kannane – K. S. Chithra
- Kutti Kutti Chellam Master – Velu & Dhivya pbs

== Critical reception ==
The Times of India wrote "Kanni Rasi is an example of how an incoherent screenplay could test the patience of viewers despite having an unusual plot which had enough scope to entertain audiences." Cinema Express wrote "With films like Kanni Raasi, you don’t even need to wait for the intermission to get your snack. You can do this even during the film, and not miss much."
