= Yuga (2006 film) =

- Release poster
- Directed by: Yaar Kannan
- Written by: E. Ramdoss (Dialogue); Jeeva Kannan (Additional Dialogue)
- Screenplay by: "Yaar" Kannan; Jeeva Kannan (assistant)
- Story by: "Yaar" Kannan
- Produced by: Creative Force Team
- Starring: Nassar; Richard; Manikandan; Swarnamalya; Sukumar; Jai; Raja; Santhoshi; Bharathi
- Cinematography: M. Sibiyon
- Edited by: Anthony
- Music by: Dhina
- Production company: Creative Force Media P. Ltd
- Release date: 14 July 2006
- Country: India
- Language: Tamil

Yuga (transl. Eon) is a 2006 Indian Tamil-language science fiction thriller film directed by Yaar Kannan and starring Nassar, Richard, Manikandan, Swarnamalya, Sukumar, Jai, Raja, Santhoshi, and Bharathi. The film was produced by fifty film technicians.

== Cast ==
- Nassar as Professor Narendran
- Richard as Sri
- Manikandan as Rishi
- Swarnamalya as Bhanu
- Sukumar as Giri
- Jai as Aravind
- Raja as Dev
- Santhoshi as Meenu
- Bharathi as Bhuvana
- Ice Ashok
- Charuhasan as Bhanu's father
- Yamuna as Elizabeth Thomas
- G. K. as the assistant commissioner
- Besant Ravi as an aghori
- King Kong as a robot
- Risha in a special appearance
- "Metti Oli" Shanti Srihari in a special appearance
- Rakshana Maurya in a special appearance

== Soundtrack ==
The music was composed by Dhina.

Song	Singers	Lyrics
"Oolala Olala"	Suchitra, Dev Prakash, Harish Raghavendra	Pa. Vijay
"Orangattu"	Aishwarya, Silambarasan	Pa. Vijay
"Pada Pada"	Anuradha Sriram	Pa. Vijay
"Theendava"	Mathangi	Pa. Vijay
"Yugaa"	Karthik	Pa. Vijay

== Reception ==
S. Sudha of Rediff.com gave the film a rating of two-and-a-half out of five stars and wrote that "On the whole, a commendable effort, considering it was completed with great difficulty". Malini Mannath of Chennai Online stated that "'Yuga' neither excites nor entertains". A critic from Cinesouth wrote that "This is not a film on love, lust or gangsterism. Such an ad propels one to buy a ticket and hasten to see what this new type of film could be. A little bit of 'wow,' and a little bit of yawn is what it turns out to be". Lajjavathi of Kalki wrote the director wants to add the supernatural to the scientific subject, but the science gets spoiled in the beginning as it is not tied properly.
