= Soundararaja =

Indian actor

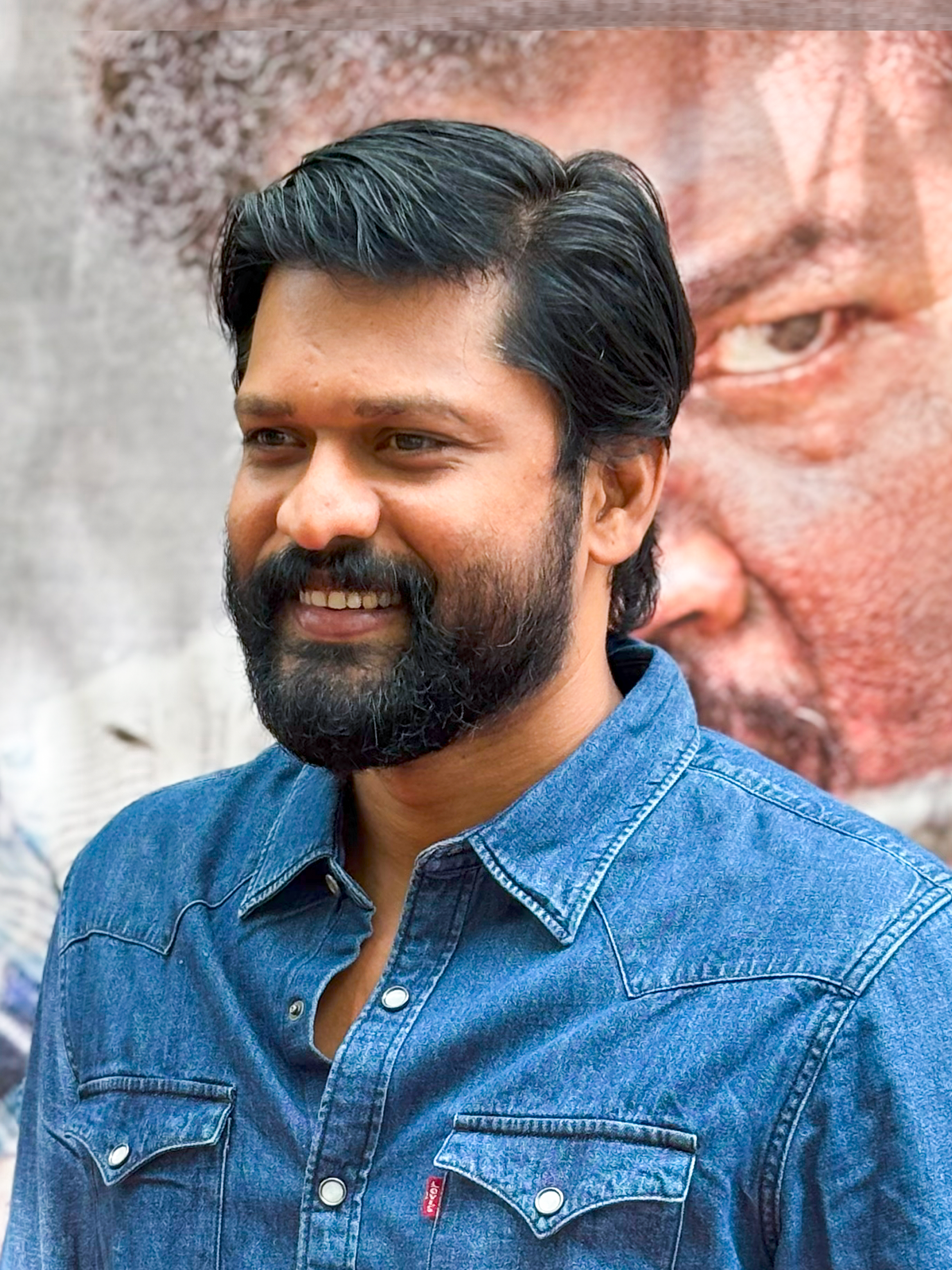
- Born: Soundararaja; August 11, 1983 (age 43); Usilampatti, Madurai, Tamil Nadu, India
- Citizenship: Indian
- Occupations: Engineer; Actor; Producer; Social Activist
- Years active: 2008–present
- Known for: Mannukkum Makkalukkum
- Spouse: Tamanna Soundararaja

Soundararaja is an Indian actor and producer who appears in Tamil films, mainly playing antagonistic and ancillary roles. His notable performances include Sundarapandian (2012), Jigarthanda (2014) and Dharma Durai (2016). He made his debut as a hero in Enakku Veru Engum Kilaigal Kidayathu (2016), which was a reasonable success in his career. He is currently nominated as an Executive Committee Member in Nadigar Sangam. Apart from his film career, Soundararaja founded the Mannukkum Makkalukkum Social Welfare Trust, and is actively associated with the political party Tamilaga Vettri Kazhagam (TVK).

== Film career ==
Soundararaja graduated his engineering degree from the Bharath Niketan Engineering College in 2004. He worked as a systems engineer in Singapore and France before deciding to pursue a career in acting in 2008. Later he joined the Chennai-based theatre group Koothu-P-Pattarai as an accountant and actor where he observed actors. He made his beginnings as a background actor, particularly playing the role of the lead character's friend in a few films, including the well-known series Penn that began in August 2008, as well as several short films as part of the television show Nalaya Iyakunar for Kalaignar TV. He worked on many short films with Manikandan and Karthik Subbaraj, who later cast him in his first feature film.

Soundararaja who went to director Lingusamy's studio to audition for his film Vettai (2011) and was selected to play Arya's friend in the film, which marked Soundararaja's film debut. Following Vettai, he worked on the film Pattarai; however, the film did not see a theatrical release. After making an appearance in S. R. Prabhakaran's Sundarapandian (2012) in a negative role, he was cast by director Ponram a supporting role in his first project, Varuthapadatha Valibar Sangam (2013). Soundararaja would later credit Prabhakaran with having had an "important role in helping him realise his dreams". He, furthermore, guided Soundararaja to many tips.

Then, Karthik Subbaraj got Soundararaja his second negative role in Jigarthanda (2013), in which he portrayed a shepherd. After Jigarthanda's release, he acted in Poojai (2014) and Bharathan's Athithi (2014).

Soundararaja made his debut as a hero in Enakku Veru Engum Kilaigal Kidayathu (2016), in which he acted alongside Goundamani. He also acted along with Vijay in Bigil (2019) as a police officer. He has performed in Thudikkum Karangal (2023) as a police official investigating the case. In Jagame Thandhiram (2021), Soundararaja appeared in a supporting role, delivering a restrained and realistic performance and also acted as lead protagonist in Saayavanam (2025).

== Activism ==
Soundararaja is a keen nature and environmental enthusiast. In 2017, he founded the Mannukkum Makkalukkum Social Welfare Trust with his friends and family. Through this foundation, he and his team have planted and maintained over 50,000 tree saplings across Tamil Nadu and have been involved in other social services, such as providing food to those affected by the COVID-19 pandemic. He is also a prominent member of Actor Vijay's political party, the Tamilaga Vettri Kazhagam (TVK), and has been actively involved in party events and social outreach programs. Soundararaja was honoured with the Kalaimagan Award at the Norway Tamil Film Festival Awards in April 2025 for his long-standing contribution to environmental conservation and sustainable agriculture.

== Filmography ==
Year	Title	Role	Notes
2012	Vettai	Madura	
2012	Sundarapandiyan	Paranjothi	
2013	Nalanum Nandhiniyum	Muthu	
2013	Varuthapadatha Valiber Sangam	Pullichathanni	
2014	Jigarthanda	Ponram	
2014	Athithi	Shiva	
2014	Aindhaam Thalaimurai Sidha Vaidhiya Sigamani	Thiru	
2014	Poojai	Soundar	
2016	Theri	Karthik	
2016	Dharmadurai	Archunan	
2016	Enakku Veru Engum Kilaigal Kidayathu	Prabha Nanthan	
2016	Rekka		
2016	Kaththi Sandai	Soundar	
2017	Thondan	Chinna Pandi	
2017	Sathriyan	Niranjan	
2017	Thangaratham	Paraman	
2017	Oru Kanavu Pola	Joseph	
2017	Thiruttu Payale 2	Maari	
2018	Kadaikutty Singam	Kodimaran	
2018	Silukkuvarupatti Singam	Raja Pandi	
2019	Coffee	Hakeem	
2019	Sindhubaadh	Politician	
2019	Bigil	Guna	
2019	Sanga Thamizhan	Murugan	
2021	Kuruthi Kalam	Arun	Web series
2021	Jagame Thandhiram	Paraman	
2021	Anandham Vilayadum Veedu	Selvam	
2022	Kallan	Selvam	
2022	Aruvaa Sanda	Pandi	
2023	Pathu Thala	Inban IPS	
2023	Thudikkum Karangal	Police official	
2023	Raid	Chitti	
2024	Kattis Gang	Guru	Malayalam film
2025	Ram Abdullah Antony	Karudan	
2025	Saayavanam	Muthu	
2026	Dorothy	Kalai	

=== Short films ===
- Wind (2011)
