= Aayudham (2008 film) =

- VCD cover
- Directed by: M. A. Nishad
- Written by: M. A. Nishad
- Screenplay by: M. A. Nishad
- Produced by: Channel Entertainments
- Starring: Suresh Gopi; Bharathi; Karthika; Bala
- Cinematography: Sanjeev Shanker
- Edited by: P. C. Mohanan
- Music by: Alphonse Joseph; Biji Bal
- Production company: GEMINI COLOR LAB
- Distributed by: Time Ads
- Release date: 16 August 2008
- Country: India
- Language: Malayalam

Aayudham is a 2008 Malayalam-language action film, written and directed by M. A. Nishad. The film stars Suresh Gopi, Thilakan, Lal, Bharathi, Karthika and Bala. The film had musical score by Alphonse Joseph and Biji Bal.

== Plot ==
A bomb blast occurs at Vilayam, a beach town in Kerala. The case is first investigated by a corrupt police commissioner Mahendra Varma, who arrests Anwar, the son of Abdullah, a local muezzin. The chief minister, Madhavan appoints Hrisikesh to investigate the crime. His team include CI Rappayi and DYSP Hamza.

Hrishi and his team learn that Chackochan, a political leader, Mahendra Varma, and Paulachan, another political leader, are behind it. He finds out that the real mastermind is Sammy Antony Williams, a wealthy NRI businessman. The movie ends with the chief minister giving Anwar a job and praising Hrishi and his team for finding the real culprits

== Cast ==
- Suresh Gopi as DIG Rishikesh IPS, Thiruvananthapuram City Police Commissioner & Thiruvananthapuram Crime Branch
- Thilakan as Kerala Chief Minister C.K. Madhavan
- Lal as Sammy Antony Williams
- Bala as Anwar Abdullah
- Murali as Abdullah, Anwar's father
- Keerikkadan Jose as Kanjirapally Crime Branch DYSP Idiyan Hamza
- Baburaj as Kunamkulam Crime Branch CI Rappayi
- Jagathy Sreekumar as Contractor Rahim Haji
- Shammi Thilakan as Professor Rasool Ahmed
- Seema as Fouziya, Anwar's Mother
- Bharathi as Adv. Raziya, Rahim's daughter and Anwar's love interest
- Karthika as Seena, Anwar's sister
- Rajan P. Dev as Plavinkombil Chackochan, Vizhinjam MLA
- Adithya Menon as City Police Commissioner Mahendra Varma IPS
- Anand as Paul Thamarakunnel "Paulachan" / Robinson Pereira
- Madhu as Thangal
- Ashokan as Hari, Rishikesh's friend
- Sadiq as Tamil Nadu Police ACP Suresh IPS
- Sudheesh as Rafeeq
- Jaffar Idukki as Counsellor Valiyapalli Kasim
- Sivaji Guruvayoor as Public Prosecutor Adv. Ummer Iqbal
- Nishanth Sagar as Sajan / Younus Muhammad
- Harikumaran Thampi as DGP Rajeev Shekar IPS
- Suvarna Mathew as SP Vandana IPS
- Ambika Mohan as Kerala Chief Secretary Haritha Nair IAS
- Urmila Unni as Leena George, Hari's friend
- Zeenath as Chackochan's wife
- Kollam Thulasi as Port Minister M. Sudevan
- Biju Pappan as CI Vikraman
- Sudheer Karamana as Cleetus
