= Deiva Machan =

2023 Indian comedy film

- Theatrical release poster
- Directed by: Martyn Nirmal Kumar
- Written by: Martyn Nirmal Kumar
- Produced by: Udaya Kumar; Geeta Udayakumar; M. P. Veeramani
- Starring: Vemal; Pandiarajan; Anitha Sampath
- Cinematography: Camil J. Alex
- Edited by: S Elayaraja
- Music by: Score: Ajesh; Songs: Godwin J. Kodan
- Production companies: Uday Productions; Magic Touch Pictures
- Release date: 21 April 2023
- Country: India
- Language: Tamil

Deiva Machan (transl.Godly brother-in-law) is a 2023 Indian Tamil-language fantasy comedy film written and directed by Martyn Nirmal Kumar in his directorial debut. The film stars Vemal, Pandiarajan and Anitha Sampath in the lead role while Neha Jha, Bala Saravanan, Aadukalam Naren in supporting roles. The film's music is composed by Godwin J. Kodan, and Ajesh composed the background score.

The story is based on the director's short film Boodham. The film was released on 21 April 2023 and received positive reviews from critics.

== Plot ==
Thabaal Karthi owns an electronic shop in his hometown of Ayyampalayam, Dindigul. A man named Saattaikkaran will appear in Karthi's dream and say the name of someone who will die soon. Whatever Saattaikkaran says will become true. His sister Kunguma Thaen's marriage proposals always end in obstruction. Finally, they find a bridegroom for her whom she is interested in marrying. But this time Saattaikkaran, in Karthi's dream, said Karthi's brother-in-law would die, so Karthi has to save his brother-in-law. He later realizes that his dream might be targeted towards him, so he has to save himself. Who actually dies forms the rest of the story.

== Cast ==
- Vemal as Thabaal Karthi
- Pandiarajan as Paramanandham
- Anitha Sampath as Kunguma Thaen
- Neha Jha as Kodimalar
- Bala Saravanan as Murugan
- Aadukalam Naren as the Zamindar
- Vela Ramamoorthy as Saattaikkaran
- Vathsan Veeramani as Azhagar
- Deepa as Manjula
- Senthi Kumari as Azhagammal
- Muruganantham as Kariththuni
- Thangadurai
- 'Kiccha' Ravi as Mani Maama
- Trichy Meesai Ramesh as Vettaikkaran Maarimuthu
- Baby Miruthika as Meenakshi
- Master Pandi as Pandi

== Production ==
The film was produced by Udaya Kumar and Geeta Udaya Kumar of Uday Productions along with M. P. Veeramani of Magic Touch Pictures. Filming was completed in May 2022. Cinematography is done by Camil J. Alex, and editing is done by S. Elayaraja. The film is a second collaboration between Vimal and Bala Saravanan after the web series Vilangu.

== Music ==
Deiva Machan

Soundtrack album by Godwin J. Kodan Score: Ajesh
- Released: 2023
- Recorded: 2022–2023
- Genre: Feature film soundtrack
- Length: 10:23
- Language: Tamil
- Label: Tips Tamil
- Producer: Godwin J. Kodan; Ajesh

Ajesh chronology
Vallavanukkum Vallavan (2023)	Deiva Machan (2023)

The film's music is composed by Godwin J. Kodan, and Ajesh composed the background score.

Track listing
No.	Title	Lyrics	Singer(s)	Length
1.	"Gopura Purave Vaa"	Karthik Netha	Nithyasree Mahadevan, Reshma Raghavendra	2:20
2.	"Kalyaana Melam"	Kabilan	Anand Aravindakshan	3:55
3.	"Pattuvaetti Santhanam"	Arun Bharathi	Mahalingam, Senthil Ganesh, Rajalakshmi	4:08
Total length:				10:23

== Release ==
The film was released on 21 April 2023.

== Reception ==
A critic from Maalai Malar stated that "Director Martin Nirmal Kumar has given Deiva Machan as a family relationship comedy." and gave 3.25 out of 5 ratings. Logesh Balachandran critic of The Times of India gave 3 stars out of 5 and wrote that "Overall, Deiva Machan is an enjoyable comedy that will leave you with a smile on your face. It may not be for everyone, nonetheless, it is a fun and entertaining film that is well worth a watch." A critic from Cinema Vikatan wrote a review stating, "Even though there are flaws in the screenplay and the story is predictable, Bala Saravanan and Vimal combo comedy scenes are well worked."
