= S. R. Prabhakaran =

Indian Tamil film director

S.R.Prabakaran
- Born: Madurai, Tamil Nadu, India
- Education: Diploma in Film Science
- Occupations: Film director, screenwriter
- Years active: 2006-present
- Spouse: Dhivya

S. R. Prabakaran (14 July) is an Indian film director primarily working in Tamil cinema. He is best known for directing his debut film Sundarapandian. He was the former associate of M. Sasikumar and also he was the former associate of S. D. Saba.

== Career ==
Sundarapandian is a 2012 Indian Tamil-language comedy drama film directed by S. R. Prabhakaran. Sasikumar played the title character, besides producing the film, while Lakshmi Menon, Vijay Sethupathi, Soori, Inigo Prabakaran and Soundararaja appeared in supporting roles. Music was composed by N. R. Raghunanthan, while cinematography was handled by Premkumar. The film released on 14 September 2012 to overall positive reviews. Following its commercial success, the film was remade in Kannada as Raja Huli and in Telugu as Speedunnodu.

== Personal life ==
S. R. Prabakaran was born in Madurai, Tamil Nadu to K.P.Sooli Ramu and S.Rajalakshmi, He has completed his diploma in Film Science. S.R.Prabakaran married Dhivya on 14 July 2013 in Madurai and the couple have a son named P.Vishal.and P.Mukhil.

== Filmography ==
=== Films ===
| Year | Film |
|---|---|
| 2012 | Sundarapandian |
| 2014 | Idhu Kathirvelan Kadhal |
| 2017 | Sathriyan |
| 2022 | Kombu Vatcha Singamda |
| TBA | Rekkai Mulaithen |

=== Web series ===
| Year | Film | Role | Network | Ref. |
|---|---|---|---|---|
| 2023 | Sengalam | | ZEE5 | |

== Awards and nominations ==
| Year | Films | Award | Category | Result |
|---|---|---|---|---|
| 2012 | Sundarapandian | Tamil Nadu State Film Awards | Best Story Writer | Won |
| 2012 | Sundarapandian | Filmfare Awards South | Best Director | Nomination |
| 2012 | Sundarapandian | SIIMA | Best Debut Director | Nomination |
| 2012 | Sundarapandian | Vijay Awards | Best Debut Director | Nomination |
| 2012 | Sundarapandian | JayaTv Awards | Best Debut Director | Won |
| 2012 | Sundarapandian | Rajtv Muthalmoovar Awards | Best Debut Director | Won |
