= Pallavan =

- DVD cover
- Directed by: Padmamagan
- Written by: Padmamagan
- Produced by: Rufus Parker
- Starring: Manoj Bharathiraja; Rathi; Shankar; Mukesh; Shara
- Cinematography: Lakshmi Narayanan
- Edited by: Pazhanivel
- Music by: Vidyasagar
- Production company: Usha Theaters
- Release date: 28 February 2003
- Country: India
- Language: Tamil

Pallavan is a 2003 Indian Tamil-language film written and directed by Padmamagan. The film stars Manoj Bharathiraja, Rathi, Shankar, Mukesh and Shara. The film was released on 28 February 2003.

== Cast ==
- Manoj Bharathiraja as Pallavan
- Rathi as Meenakshi "Meena" and Reena (dual role)
- Shankar as Manohar
- Mukesh as Zakir
- Shara as Anitha
- Abhishek Shankar
- Vijayan as Meena and Reena's father
- Nalini as Amudha, Meena and Reena's mother
- Ilavarasu as Pallavan and Manohar's father
- Kumarimuthu as Nallakannu
- Mayilsamy as 'Biodata' Paramasivan
- Madhan Bob as College principal
- Chaplin Balu as Bus conductor
- Gumtaj as Mala
- Manager Cheena as Manager
- Benjamin as Bus driver

== Production ==
Directed by Padmamagan, making his first film, several new actors were cast alongside the lead duo of Manoj Bharathiraja and Rathi. Munna, a nephew of actress Jayabharathi, made his first acting appearance and was credited as Shankar, alongside Mukesh and Bangalore-based actress Shara. Padmamagan signed up for the film after having previously written dialogues in the Raghava Lawrence-starrer Style and associated with producer Rufus Parker. The title of the film Padmamagan, was inspired by the name by which Chennai's state-owned city buses were known earlier and Padmamagan hoped to evoke nostalgia amongst the audience. Several scenes and songs for the film were also shot on board in the city's buses.

== Soundtrack ==
Soundtrack was composed by Vidyasagar, while lyrics written by Palani Bharathi.

- "Mercury Poove" — Devan, Pop Shalini
- "Oho Nu Sollu" — Tippu, Timmy
- "Saidudu Saidudu" — Karthik, Timmy
- "Emmaithal" — S. P. Balasubrahmanyam
- "Ma Venuma" — Anuradha Sriram

== Release and reception ==
The film was released on 28 February 2003. A reviewer from Sify wrote "no one expects too much reality in films these days but here the plot is unrelentingly silly that you heave a sigh of relief when the film is over" and "you strive hard to find one redeeming factor in this film, which is technically slipshod with bad direction and jarring music". Malini Mannath of Chennai Online wrote "[..] if you look out for something refreshing in the scripting or narration, you’ll be thoroughly disappointed. For the narration runs on stale, predictable lines, and the style is frivolous to boot".
