= Kalavani 2 =

2019 Indian film by A. Sarkunam

- Theatrical release poster
- Directed by: A. Sarkunam
- Produced by: A. Sarkunam
- Starring: Vimal; Oviya
- Cinematography: Masani
- Edited by: Raja Mohammad
- Music by: Natarajan Sankaran (score); Mani Amudhavan (songs); V2 (songs); V. Ronald Regan (songs)
- Production company: Varmans Productions
- Release date: 5 July 2019
- Running time: 143 minutes
- Country: India
- Language: Tamil

Kalavani 2 (transl. Thief 2) is a 2019 Indian Tamil-language romantic comedy film directed and produced by A. Sarkunam. The film stars Vimal and Oviya, with RJ Vigneshkanth amongst others in supporting roles. This is Vimal's 25th film. A standalone sequel to Kalavani (2010), the film began production in February 2018. It was released on 5 July 2019 to negative reviews.

== Plot ==
Arivazhagan (Vimal) continues his fraudulent existence with a new friend Vicky (RJ Vigneshkanth) in town. When the Panchayat elections are announced, Arivazhagan 's uncle and the father of his lover Maheswari (Oviya) are contesting for the local bodies elections. The Kalavani plans to file nomination on his own hoping that either side would pay him off to avoid splitting of votes and cheats Panchayat (Ganja Karuppu) to finance this scheme.

== Cast ==
- Vimal as Arivazhagan (Arikki) / A. M. R.
- Oviya as Maheshwari (Mahesh) Arivazhagan
- RJ Vigneshkanth as Vicky
- Saranya Ponvannan as Lakshmi
- Durai Sudhakar as Rajendran (A) Raavana
- Ilavarasu as Annamalai
- Ganja Karuppu as Panchayathu
- Villain Raj as Chelladurai, Maheshwari's father
- Senthi Kumari as Mrs. Chelladurai, Maheshwari's mother
- Vinodhini Vaidyanathan as Manimekalai Rajendran
- Mayilsamy as Chinnasaamy (Thosai)
- Imman Annachi as Nallathambi
- TSR Srinivasan as Election Commissioner
- Usha Elizabeth as Chinnasaamy's wife
- Shanthi Mani
- Sindhiya as Maheshwari's friend
- Mannai Sathik as Maheswari's blackmailer
- Kannayiram

== Production ==
Upon release in 2010, Kalavani, produced by Nazir, had become a surprise success and performed well at the box office, effectively making the careers of director Sarkunam, actor Vimal and actress Oviya. In November 2016, reports emerged that Sarkunam and Vimal were coming together for a sequel but Sarkunam continued to concentrate on the pre-production of a film starring Madhavan. In October 2017, Vimal denied signing the film and dispelled reports that a sequel was in production for producer Nazir.

In a turn of events in February 2018, Sarkunam shelved his proposed film with Madhavan and announced that he would make a sequel to Kalavani. He launched his own production house, Varmans Productions, to fund the film and cast Vimal Oviya, while titling the project as K2. Soon after Sarkunam's announcement, Nazir revealed that he was unhappy at this proposal, and that he would begin work on a separate film titled Kalavani 2 as he had the original rights to the title. He suggested that production would begin in mid-2018 after he had finished making a film titled Vadam with Poonam Kaur.

Despite the ongoing issue, Sarkunam began shooting the film with Vimal in February 2018, with Oviya joining the team in May 2018. Several members of the original film's cast joined the project, except Soori, with Vigneshkanth signed on instead.
