= Sathriyan (2017 film) =

2017 Tamil action drama film by S. R. Prabhakaran

- Theatrical release poster
- Directed by: S. R. Prabhakaran
- Written by: S. R. Prabhakaran
- Produced by: T. T. G. Thyagasaravanan; Selvi Thiyagarajan
- Starring: Vikram Prabhu; Manjima Mohan; Kavin; Aishwarya Dutta; Rio Raj
- Cinematography: Sivakumar Vijayan
- Edited by: M. Venkat
- Music by: Yuvan Shankar Raja
- Production company: Sathya Jyothi Films
- Distributed by: Saattai Karthik
- Release date: 9 June 2017
- Country: India
- Language: Tamil

Sathriyan (transl. Warrior) is a 2017 Indian Tamil-language action drama film written and directed by S. R. Prabhakaran and produced by Sathya Jyothi Films. The film features Vikram Prabhu and Manjima Mohan, while Kavin, Aishwarya Dutta and Rio Raj play supporting roles. The film was shot in Tiruchirappalli. The music was composed by Yuvan Shankar Raja with cinematography by Sivakumar Vijayan and editing by M. Venkat. The film released on 9 June 2017.

== Plot ==
Niranjana is the daughter of Samuthiram, Tiruchirapalli's biggest rowdy, who works for the minister as his minion. The minister calls Samuthiram and tells him to come to one of his factories to handle a personal matter. Upon arriving, Samuthiram becomes suspicious as no one is present. He calls Ravi, his second-in-command, and asks for one of their boys to check on him. Meanwhile, the minister's goon Shankar and his gang arrive and kill Samuthiram for meeting with the opposing party's minister. Guna, having been sent by Ravi, arrives and finds Samuthiram dead. The gang holds a funeral with Samuthiram's family, and Ravi swears loyalty to them. Guna kills Vetri, a goon from Shankar's gang, for becoming an approver.

Meanwhile, some guys have been harassing Niranjana at her college bus stop for weeks. Her mother asks Ravi to send someone to take care of it. Ravi sends Guna, who slashes the guy's arm. Later, that guy's friends threaten to throw acid on Niranjana if he does not recover, and Guna is tasked with following and keeping Niranjana safe until she finishes college. She slowly falls in love with him and proposes to Guna, but he refuses, saying that love will not work for him and that the townspeople respect and fear him. She asks him to spend a day without any weapons. He does this, but learns that Shankar's men are following him on that very day.

The next day, Niranjana asks Guna if he was scared even for a minute because he had no weapons with him. She tells him that he was not fearing the enemy but their weapons; similarly, the town's people are afraid of his weapons and not him. She tells him to come out of this delusion and seriously consider starting a life and family for himself. She also says she will wait for him until then. Guna then starts reciprocating her feelings. He tells Ravi about his love for Niranjana, but Ravi tells Guna to forget her, as it is inappropriate.

Meanwhile, Shankar's gang follows Guna to kill him, and he gets stabbed but survives with the help of Dr. Chandran. Niranjana's family learns about Guna's relationship with her and refuses to accept it. Guna gets into a scuffle with Niranjana's brother. Shankar and his gang try to kill Guna again, and Guna ends up killing Shankar and eloping with Niranjana to Thondi while Ravi and the police continue to search for him. Guna asks Chandran to fetch ₹7 lakhs, his passport, and his mother's wedding chain from his home, and Chandran goes to Guna's house. One of Ravi's men informs Ravi about someone's presence in the house. Ravi and three of his men wait outside to stab the man, as they think it is Guna. They stab the man, who turns out to be Chandran. Ravi asks where Guna is, but Chandran refuses to tell. Ravi tells him to tell Guna that he will find them and bring Niranjana home by killing Guna, and lets Chandran go.

Guna is furious that Ravi, whom he thought of as his own brother, tried to kill him. He goes to Trichy, where a chase and fight ensue between Guna, Ravi, and his gang, with Guna gaining the upper hand and slashing Ravi multiple times. Ravi asks Guna to kill him, but Guna cannot bring himself to do so. He asks Ravi to leave everything and takes him to the hospital. Guna also convinces his friend from Shankar's gang to leave the violent life behind and join him. The film ends with Guna, Niranjana, Chandran, and his girlfriend having married; Ravi, his wife, and his children coming to Niranjana's home; and her mother taking an aarti to everyone.

== Cast ==
- Vikram Prabhu as Gunasekaran "Guna"
- Manjima Mohan as Niranjana
- Kavin as Dr. Chandran
- Aishwarya Dutta as Dr. Chandran's love interest (girlfriend)
- Rio Raj as Guna's friend
- Sharath Lohitashwa as Samuthiram, Niranjana's father
- Aadukalam Naren as Vijayan
- Poster Nandakumar as Minister
- Aruldoss as Shankar
- R. K. Vijay Murugan as Ravi
- Tara as Niranjana's mother
- Soundararaja as Niranjan
- Nitish Veera as Vetri
- Yogi Babu as Samudhram's nephew
- Florent Pereira as Police Commissioner
- Veluthu Kattu Kathir as Kani
- Sundari Divya as Kavi
- Vishnu Priya as Niranjana's friend
- Supergood Subramani as Manikandan

== Production ==
Sathya Jyothi Films signed on director S. R. Prabhakaran to direct a film for their production house during the middle of 2015, with Vikram Prabhu joining the team in September 2015 to portray the leading role. The film, featuring music by Yuvan Shankar Raja and cinematography by Sivakumar Vijayan, was initially set to be launched in early December 2015, but the 2015 South Indian floods meant that the event was delayed by a month. In December 2015, Manjima Mohan was signed on to portray the leading role before the release of her first Tamil venture, the GVM-directional Achcham Yenbadhu Madamaiyada (2016), opposite Silambarasan.

The film's title of Mudi Sooda Mannan was announced in June 2016, before the title was changed to Sathriyan.

== Soundtrack ==
Sathriyan (Original Motion Picture Soundtrack)

Soundtrack album by Yuvan Shankar Raja
- Released: 30 January 2017
- Venue: Chennai
- Studio: U1 Records
- Genre: Feature film soundtrack
- Length: 12:49
- Language: Tamil
- Label: U1 Records
- Producer: Yuvan Shankar Raja

Yuvan Shankar Raja chronology
Taramani (2016)	Sathriyan (Original Motion Picture Soundtrack) (2017)	Kadamban (2017)

The soundtrack was composed by Yuvan Shankar Raja, and the audio was released on 30 January 2017. Behindwoods stated, "A short album that has the stamp of Yuvan Shankar Raja! Very specific and to the point composing by YSR for Sathriyan". the songs "Paarai Mele" and "Sathriyan In Action (Theme)" were well received.

Track listing
No.	Title	Lyrics	Singer(s)	Length
1.	"Sooda Oru Sooriyan"	Vivek	Deepak	3:36
2.	"Paarai Mele"	Snehan	Yuvan Shankar Raja	3:36
3.	"Maina Rendu"	Vairamuthu	Vijay Yesudas	3:40
4.	"Sathriyan In Action (Theme)"			1:57
Total length:				12:49

== Reception ==
Baradwaj Rangan of Film Companion wrote "The biggest problem is the running time, over two-and-a-half hours"

== Home media ==
The satellite rights of the film were sold to Sun TV And Sun NXT.
