= Thiru. Vi. Ka. Poonga =

2015 Indian film by Senthil Sel Am

- Directed by: Senthil Sel M
- Written by: Senthil Sel M
- Produced by: Senthil Sel M
- Starring: Senthil Sel M; Swati; Susan
- Music by: Praveen Mirra
- Production company: Budget Film Company
- Release date: 2 January 2015
- Running time: 119 minutes
- Country: India
- Language: Tamil

Thiru.Vi.Ka.Poonga, also spelt as Thiru Vi Ka Poonga, (transl. Mr. V. K. Park) is a 2015 Indian Tamil-language drama film written, produced and directed by Senthil Sel Am on his directorial debut starring himself, Swati and Susan in the lead role. The film had its theatrical release on 2 January 2015 and opened to mostly mixed to negative reviews from critics and audience.

== Cast ==
- Senthil Sel Am
- Swati
- Susan
- John Vijay
- Yuga
- Kadhal Dandapani

== Reception ==
Malini Mannath of The New Indian Express wrote, "Thiru Vi Ka Poonga isn’t entirely a disappointing fare and delivers more than what one expects".

A critic from Dinamalar concluded that the film is not deserted like the Chennai Municipal parks but not full of flowers either. The reviewer added that it was refreshing in some aspects.
