= Andaman (2016 film) =

Indian Tamil-language romantic comedy film

- Directed by: Aadhavan
- Written by: T. R. S. Ramani Iyer
- Produced by: A. Kannadasan
- Starring: Richard; Manochitra; Thalaivasal Vijay
- Cinematography: R. Selva
- Edited by: Anil Malnad
- Music by: S. P. L. Selvadasan
- Production company: Sudha Movie Creations
- Release date: 16 December 2016
- Running time: 125 minutes
- Country: India
- Language: Tamil

Andaman is a 2016 Indian Tamil-language drama film written and directed by Aadhavan. The film features Richard and Manochitra in the lead roles, alongside Thalaivasal Vijay and Manobala. Produced by Sudha Movie Creations, the film was released on 16 December 2016.

== Cast ==
- Richard
- Manochitra
- Kannadasan
- Thalaivasal Vijay
- Nizhalgal Ravi
- Manobala
- Vaiyapuri
- Crane Manohar
- Scissor Manohar
- Chaams
- Bonda Mani
- Nellai Siva
- Gana Bala

== Production ==
The film marked the directorial debut of Adhavan, an erstwhile assistant to S. P. Jananathan, while Ramani Iyer, wrote the film's songs, story, and dialogue for the project. After being launched in Chennai during April 2016, the film was largely shot in the Andaman and Nicobar Islands. A fight sequence between the lead actor Richard and the antagonist Kannadasan was shot on a ship for five days. Romantic scenes between Kannadasan and Manochitra was also shot on the boat.

== Soundtrack ==
The film's audio launch was held at RKV Studios in Chennai on 11 July 2016. The soundtrack had four songs composed by S. P. L. Selvadasan.

- Ayyo Iva - Prasanna
- Kalai Malai - Gana Bala
- Co Co Cola - Nincey
- Anbennum Thaye - Jagadish
- Jil Jil - Vaishanavi
- En Vanathil - Vallavan, Vandhana

== Release and reception ==
The film had a theatrical release across Tamil Nadu on 16 December 2016. A critic from Iflicks noted "overall, Andaman is a film that can be watched once, adding "these actors, who are known for their acting prowess could have been utilized in a better way" and the "screenplay could have been made more racy too". A reviewer from Maalai Malar called the film "watchable" and gave the film a mixed review.
