= Bharathi (Tamil actress) =

Indian actress

- Born: Coimbatore, Tamil Nadu, India
- Occupation: Actress
- Years active: 2003-2015

Bharathi is an Indian actress who has appeared in the Tamil film industry. The actress won critical acclaim for her performance as a prostitute in Ammuvagiya Naan (2007) and later appeared in other Tamil and Malayalam language films.

== Career ==
Bharathi was signed on by director Padmamagan to be a part of Ammuvagiya Naan (2007), after several leading actresses had turned down the role. She portrayed a prostitute who attempts to ease back into society, and won critical acclaim for her portrayal with a reviewer noting she was "blessed with a role of her lifetime". Despite the success of Ammuvagiya Naan, Bharathi failed to get good offers in Tamil films and instead signed on to feature in Malayalam films. The actress signed on to appear in Anwar Rasheed's Annan Thambi (2008) opposite Mammootty, but was later replaced by Lakshmi Rai. She then however moved on to work in Biju Pal's Aayudham (2008), featuring alongside Suresh Gopi. The film failed to become a box office success, and subsequently failed to garner further big budget film offers for Bharathi. She was also seen in Agathiyan's romantic film Nenjathai Killadhe (2008) with Vikranth and in Satrumun Kidaitha Thagaval (2009), a low-budget thriller, featuring stunt choreographer Kanal Kannan in the leading role.

Bharathi subsequently turned down approaches to be a part of Engal Aasan (2009) and Enga Raasi Nalla Raasi (2009), and chose to quit the film industry after her marriage to her manager, Murugan. In 2010, she expressed a desire to make a comeback to acting. She began work on Rudhram, a television soap drama on Jaya TV in late 2012.

== Filmography ==
Films

- All films are in Tamil, unless otherwise noted.

Year	Film	Role	Notes
2003	Arasu	Meera's friend	
2003	Well Done	Thamarai's friend	
2003	Enakku 20 Unakku 18	College student	Uncredited role; Bilingual film in Tamil and Telugu (as Nee Manasu Naaku Telusu)
2004	Campus	Student	
2005	Vetrivel Sakthivel	Selvi	
2006	Laya		
2006	Yuga	Bhuvana	
2007	Ammuvagiya Naan	Ammu	
2008	Nenjathai Killadhe	Anandhi	
2008	Aayudham	Raziya	Malayalam film
2009	Satrumun Kidaitha Thagaval	Thenmozhi	
2009	Aadatha Aattamellam	Divya	

Television

- Rudhram (Jaya TV)
- Adhey Kangal (Jaya TV)
- Kalyani (Surya TV)
- Sondha Bandham (Sun TV)
