= Sundarapandian =

2012 Tamil film by S. R. Prabhakaran

- Theatrical release poster
- Directed by: S. R. Prabhakaran
- Written by: S. R. Prabhakaran
- Produced by: M. Sasikumar
- Starring: M. Sasikumar; Lakshmi Menon; Vijay Sethupathi
- Cinematography: Premkumar Chandran
- Edited by: Biju V. Don Bosco
- Music by: N. R. Raghunanthan
- Production company: Company Production
- Release date: 14 September 2012
- Running time: 182 minutes
- Country: Indian
- Language: Tamil

Sundarapandian is a 2012 Indian Tamil-language action comedy drama film written and directed by S. R. Prabhakaran in his debut and produced by M. Sasikumar. The film stars Sasikumar as the title character, Lakshmi Menon and Vijay Sethupathi, while Inigo Prabhakaran, Soori, Appukutty, and Soundararaja appear in supporting roles. The music was composed by N. R. Raghunanthan, while cinematography was handled by Premkumar Chandran.

Sundarapandian was released on 14 September 2012 and was a critical and commercial success, winning three Tamil Nadu State Film Awards. It was remade in Kannada as Raja Huli (2013) and in Telugu as Speedunnodu (2016).

== Plot ==
In Kandamanoor, near Theni, Sundarapandian is the only son of Raghupathi, a landlord and village head. Sundarapandian's close friend Arivazhagan "Arivu", who failed the board exams twice and is now in his final year of college, falls in love with Archana from a nearby village, who commutes daily on the bus from Madurai to Theni. Arivu is too timid to express his feelings and seeks Sundarapandian and Murgesan's assistance in confessing his love.

Sundarapandian, Murugesan, and Arivu commute on the same bus as Archana. Bhuvaneshwaran "Bhuvanesh", who also travels on the bus, tries to propose to Archana, leading to a clash with Arivu. Sundarapandian gives Bhuvanesh 31 days to win Archana's heart, however, he fails, giving Arivu again a chance. But a surprising twist emerges: Sundarapandian had proposed to Archana three years ago while he was in college and was rejected. Encouraged by Arivu, Sundarapandian decides to propose again, but Archana unexpectedly proposes to Sundarapandian, revealing she's had feelings for him all along. Arivu steps aside, and Sundarapandian accepts Archana's proposal. However, Archana's parents want her to marry their relative Jegan, despite her disinterest.

Archana asks Sundarapandian to give her space during her exams. Bhuvanesh takes advantage of this and harasses Archana on the bus. Sundarapandian intervenes, but Bhuvanesh continues to cause trouble. In a violent confrontation, Bhuvanesh is pushed out of the moving bus and dies. Sundarapandian is arrested, but released on bail as it's deemed an accident. Sundarapandian's father, Raghupathi, takes care of Bhuvanesh's family. However, Bhuvanesh's friends vow to take revenge on Sundarapandian, while Paranjothi secretly harbours anger towards him. Raghupathi convinces Archana's father Pandi to accept his proposal for Archana and Sundarapandian to marry. Jegan is furious about the upcoming wedding and discovers that Sundarapandian is his old college friend. Jegan decides to kill Sundarapandian, and Paranjothi agrees to help. Paranjothi tricks Sundarapandian into meeting Jegan, claiming he's become a drunkard. Sundarapandian decides to help Jegan, unaware of the danger. Arivu accompanies Sundarapandian to the meeting, oblivious to the planned ambush.

Sundarapandian meets Jegan on the outskirts of town and tries to reason with him. However, Jegan and Paranjothi attack Sundarapandian. In a shocking turn, Arivu stabs Sundarapandian, revealing his hidden vengeance. Sundarapandian fights back, confronting Jegan, Arivu, and Paranjothi. He scolds Jegan for trying to force Archana into marriage, despite knowing that she is in love with him. Sundarapandian also exposes Paranjothi's betrayal, revealing that he had sent thugs to kill him. Moreover, he reveals that Arivu was the one who killed Bhuvanesh, not him. Sundarapandian had taken the blame to protect Arivu. Heartbroken, Sundarapandian leaves, lamenting the loss of his closest friends.

Sundarapandian and Archana tie the knot. The film concludes with Sundarapandian choosing to keep the betrayal by his friends a secret, instead opting to quietly end their friendships.

== Cast ==
- M. Sasikumar as Sundarapandian
- Lakshmi Menon as P. Archana (voice dubbed by Meenalokshini)
- Vijay Sethupathi as S. Jegan
- Inigo Prabhakaran as Arivazhagan
- Soori as Murugesan
- Appukutty as Bhuvaneshwaran
- Aadukalam Naren as Kandamanoor Raghupathi Thevar
- Thennavan as Pandi Thevar
- Soundararaja as Paranjothi
- Tulasi as Archana's mother
- Sujatha as Archana's aunt
- Neethu Neelambaran as Ilamathi
- Thavasi
- Winner Ramachandran
- Soumya as Sundarapandian's mother

== Production ==
Sundarapandian is the directorial debut of Prabhakaran, previously an assistant director under Sasikumar; the latter produced the film and also plays the lead role. Prabhakaran cast Lakshmi Menon as the lead actress after being impressed with her performance in Kumki (2012).

== Soundtrack ==
The music was composed by N. R. Raghunanthan. The audio was released by Bala and received by Muthaiya and Socrates, two assistant directors of Sasikumar.

Track listing
No.	Title	Lyrics	Singer(s)	Length
1.	"Kadhal Vandhu"	Na. Muthukumar	Haricharan
2.	"Kondaadum Manasu"	Mohan Rajan	Anand Aravindakshan
3.	"Rekkai Mulaiththen"	Madhan Karky	G. V. Prakash Kumar, Shreya Ghoshal
4.	"Nenjukkulle"	Thamarai	Saindhavi

== Critical reception ==
N. Venkateswaran from The Times of India gave the film 3.5 out of 5 and called it a "clean family entertainer". The reviewer wrote that "the racy script, easy flowing dialogues and the twists he introduces in the screenplay to take it off the beaten path are commendable" and added that "one more student has passed out with flying colours from the Sasikumar school of cinema". Vivek Ramz of In.com wrote "Sundarapandiyan is a well made commercial flick with right dose of comedy, sentiment and thrill". IBNLive claimed that the film was an "honest attempt. Prabhakar does his best and make it an interesting watch thanks to Sasikumar". A critic from Sify wrote that debutant director SR Prabhakaran made "a confident debut with a film that is both respectable and engaging" Anupama Subramanian from Deccan Chronicle described it as an "honest attempt from Prabhakaran which is engaging family fare", while noting that "Sasi[kumar]'s touches [were] seen till [the] climax". Similarly, Zee News termed the film a "satisfying wholesome entertainer".

== Accolades ==
Event	Category	Recipient(s)	Verdict	Ref.
Tamil Nadu State Film Awards	Best Actress	Lakshmi Menon	Won	
Tamil Nadu State Film Awards	Best Villain	Vijay Sethupathi	Won	
Tamil Nadu State Film Awards	Best Screenplay Writer	S. R. Prabhakaran	Won	
60th Filmfare Awards South	Best Film – Tamil	Sundarapandian	Nominated	
60th Filmfare Awards South	Best Director – Tamil	S. R. Prabhakaran	Nominated	
2nd South Indian International Movie Awards	Best Film	Sundarapandian	Nominated	
2nd South Indian International Movie Awards	Best Debutant Director	S. R. Prabhakaran	Nominated	
2nd South Indian International Movie Awards	Best Debutant Female	Lakshmi Menon	Won	
2nd South Indian International Movie Awards	Best Comedian	Soori	Nominated	
2nd South Indian International Movie Awards	Best Cinematographer	Premkumar	Nominated	
7th Vijay Awards	Best Debutant Director	S. R. Prabhakaran	Nominated	
7th Vijay Awards	Best Debutant Actress	Lakshmi Menon	Nominated	
7th Vijay Awards	Best Supporting Actor	Aadukalam Naren	Nominated	
7th Vijay Awards	Best Comedian	Soori	Nominated	
7th Vijay Awards	Face of the Year	Lakshmi Menon	Nominated	
7th Vijay Awards	Favourite Hero	M. Sasikumar	Nominated	
7th Vijay Awards	Favourite Film	Sundarapandian	Nominated	
Ananda Vikatan Cinema Awards	Best Debutant Actress	Lakshmi Menon	Won	
