= A. Sarkunam =

Indian film director, screenwriter and film producer (born 1975)

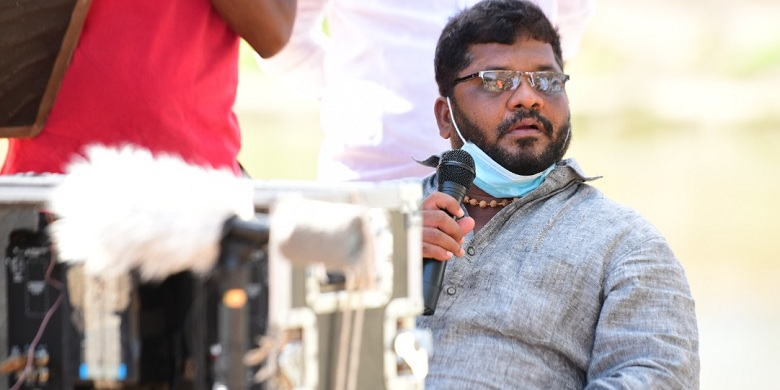
- Sarkunam at shooting spot
- Born: 23 April 1975 (age 51); Ambalapattu, Thanjavur district, Tamil Nadu, India
- Occupations: Film director; Screenwriter; Film producer
- Years active: 2010–present

A. Sarkunam (born 23 April 1975) is an Indian film director, working in the Tamil cinema. He worked as an associate with director A. L. Vijay.

== Career ==
Sarkunam made his directorial debut with the romantic comedy Kalavani (2009). Featuring Vimal and Oviya in the lead roles, the film released to positive critical response and went on to become a sleeper hit. His next film was the period piece Vaagai Sooda Vaa (2011) again starring Vimal which also received positive reviews. The film earned the prestigious National Film Award for Best Feature Film in Tamil. Sarkunam said that Vaagai Sooda Vaa was his first script and dream project. He then made a romantic comedy film titled Naiyaandi with Dhanush and Nazriya Nazim in the lead.

In 2014, he started new production company "A Sarkunam Cinemaz" and introduced his brother A. Nandha Kumar as a producer. Their first production was Manjapai, which marked the directorial debut of Sarkunam's former assistant N. Raghavan. His fourth film Chandi Veeran, produced by Bala and starring Atharvaa and Anandhi was released in 2015. This film also got good reviews and it had many similarities with his first film, Kalavani.

== Filmography ==
Year	Film	Credited as			Notes
Year	Film	Director	Producer	Writer	Notes
2010	Kalavani	✓	✗	✓	Tamil Nadu State Film Award for Best Film (Second Prize) Tamil Nadu State Film Award for Best Dialogue Writer
2011	Vaagai Sooda Vaa	✓	✗	✓	Tamil Nadu State Film Award for Best Film; National Film Award for Best Feature Film in Tamil
2013	Naiyaandi	✓	✗	✓	
2014	Manjapai	✗	✓	✗	Associated with N. Linguswamy's Thirupathi Brothers
2015	Chandi Veeran	✓	✗	✓	
2017	Dora	✗	✓	✗	Co-producer
2019	Kalavani 2	✓	✓	✓	
2022	Pattathu Arasan	✓	✗	✓	
2025	Galatta Family	✓	✗	✓	
2026	Exam	✓	✗	✓	Web series
