= Vetrivel Sakthivel =

- DVD cover
- Directed by: Lakshmi Priyan
- Written by: Lakshmi Priyan
- Produced by: R. S. Venkatraman
- Starring: Sathyaraj; Sibiraj; Khushbu Sundar; Nikita Thukral
- Cinematography: A. Kasi Viswa
- Edited by: K. Palanivel
- Music by: Srikanth Deva
- Production company: Laxmi Arts
- Release date: 9 December 2005
- Running time: 155 minutes
- Country: India
- Language: Tamil

Vetrivel Sakthivel is a 2005 Indian Tamil-language action comedy film written and directed by Lakshmi Priyan and produced by R. S. Venkatraman. It stars Sathyaraj and his son Sibiraj alongside Khushbu Sundar and Nikita Thukral, while Vadivelu, Bharathi, and Thambi Ramaiah play supporting roles. The music was composed by Srikanth Deva, while editing was dole by K. Palanivel. The film was released on 9 December 2005.

== Plot ==
Vetrivel is a businessman who lives with his wife Kamatchi, son Sakthivel, daughter Selvi, and brother-in-law Thandapani. Sakthi wanted to become as an IPS officer, but his father denied it and made him work in his shop. Selvi gets married and lives happily, while Sakthi falls in love with Manju. It turns out that Manju is the daughter of Vetri's sister, who eloped with someone. Since Vetri has lost touch with his sister, Manju came into their lives to reunite the siblings. Meanwhile, Selvi finds out that her husband, father-in-law, and mother-in-law are culprits and smugglers. Before she can tell someone about it, she is killed, and her child is kept. Sakthi goes to visit his sister and finds her dead. Sakthi takes vengeance on his sister's murderers and goes to jail, while Manju's mother reunites with her brother Vetri. After having served his jail sentence, Sakthi marries Manju and lives happily ever after.

== Cast ==
- Sathyaraj as Vetrivel
- Sibiraj as Sakthivel
- Khushbu Sundar as Kamatchi
- Nikita as Manju
- Vadivelu as Thandapani
- Bharathi as Selvi
- Thambi Ramaiah as Selvi's father-in-law
- Poovilangu Mohan as Manju's father
- T. P. Gajendran as Marriage Broker
- Singamuthu as Buyer
- Bonda Mani as Seller
- Halwa Vasu as Auto Driver
- Pondy Ravi as Police Officer
- Nellai Siva as Villager
- Jaguar Thangam as Villager

== Production ==
During production, the film was briefly titled as Vel Vel and then as Vel Vel Brothers, before being named Vetrivel Sakthivel after the lead characters.

== Soundtrack ==
Soundtrack was composed by Srikanth Deva who reused the song "Thangapadakathin Mele" from Engal Thangam originally composed by M. S. Viswanathan.

Song	Singers	Lyrics	Length
"Azhaguna Azhagu"	Tippu, Anuradha Sriram	Lakshmi Priyan	4:41
"En Chella"	P. Jayachandran, K. S. Chithra	Pa. Vijay	6:19
"Kollaikara"	Vijay Yesudas, Pop Shalini	Yugabharathi	5:16
"Madhura Karichi"	Mukesh Mohamed, Srilekha Parthasarathy	Lakshmi Priyan	4:44
"Thangapadakathin"	S. P. Balasubrahmanyam, K. S. Chithra	Vaali	4:35

== Reception ==
Sify called the film "nepotism of the worst kind", going to add that "director Lakshmi Priyan has dished out one of the most inept movies of the year". Malini Mannath of Chennai Online wrote, "The film is neither a Satyaraj flick, where one could have enjoyed his typical style of humour, nor is it a youthful film where Sibi could have come into his own", adding, "If anybody does leaves a mark it's Vadivelu, who valiantly tries to entertain with his brand of humour, not always succeeding".
