= Thudikkum Karangal (2023 film) =

2023 Tamil film

- Theatrical release poster
- Directed by: Velu Doss
- Produced by: K. Annadurai
- Starring: Vimal; Misha Narang; Sathish
- Cinematography: Rammy
- Edited by: Lawrence Kishore
- Music by: Ragav Prasad
- Release date: 8 September 2023
- Running time: 122 mins
- Country: India
- Language: Tamil

Thudikkum Karangal (transl. Shivering hands) is a 2023 Indian Tamil-language action crime drama film directed by Velu Doss and starring Vimal and Misha Narang in the lead roles. It was released on 8 September 2023.

== Plot ==
Vetri, a YouTuber who owns a channel called Kothu Poratta, often invites trouble by exposing the evils in society. He meets an old man who is in search of his son, Sameer. Vetri extends his support to the old man through his channel, promising to help him find his lost son. Parallelly, we also get to witness the investigation of a murder case that involves the daughter of IG Devendran.

== Cast ==
- Vimal as Vetri
- Misha Narang as Lavanya
- Sathish as Annamalai
- Suresh Chandra Menon as Devaraj
- Sangili Murugan as Sameer’s father
- Soundararaja as Police Official
- Billy Murali as Mutton Ravi
- Shanmugam Muthusamy
- Ananth Nag as Sameer
- Jayachandran
- Swaminathan
- Vazhakku En Muthuraman as Vetri’s father
- Ashok Pandian
- Sittarasu
- Rindhu Ravi as Vetri's mother
- Gowri Punithan

== Production ==
The film began production in February 2020 under the title of Vetri Kondaan. Production was halted owing to the coronavirus pandemic, and restarted in August 2021. It was shot completely in Chennai over a period of 49 days.

== Reception ==
The film was released on 8 September 2023 across theatres in Tamil Nadu, a week after its initial release date of September 1. A reviewer from Times of India noted it was "a run-of-the-mill action crime drama" and that the "technical aspects of the film, including cinematography and music, do nothing to elevate certain moments". A critic from Dinamalar concluded the film was "low on thrills" and gave it 2.25 out of 5 stars.
