= Dhandapani =

Dhandapani is a surname. People with the surname include:

- Kadhal Dhandapani
- M. Dhandapani
- C. T. Dhandapani
