= Vimal (actor) =

Indian actor (born 1979)

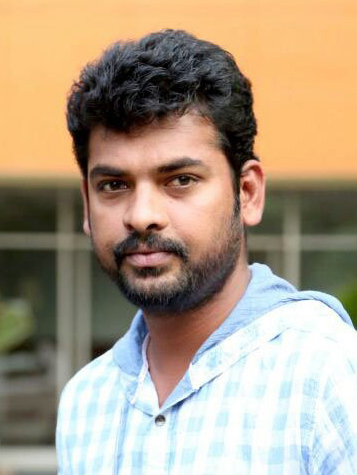
- Vimal in 2014
- Born: Ramesh Vimal Ramasamy; 25 April 1979 (age 47); Pannankombu, Manapparai, Trichy, Tamil Nadu, India
- Other name: Galaxy Star
- Occupations: Actor; producer
- Years active: 2001–present
- Spouse: Akshaya (m. 2010)
- Children: 3

Vimal is an Indian actor working in Tamil films. He appeared in a supporting role in Kanchivaram (2008), and played the lead role in Pasanga in 2009.

Vimal's breakthrough came with the film Kalavani in 2010. He further acted in movies such as Vaagai Sooda Vaa (2011), Kalakalappu (2012), Kedi Billa Killadi Ranga (2013), Manjapai (2014), Mannar Vagaiyara (2018) and Deiva Machan (2023).

== Early life ==
Vimal was born on 25 April 1979, in Pannankombu, a village near Manapparai, Tiruchirappalli district, Tamil Nadu, and later moved to Chennai. He discontinued his studies and began learning dancing and joined the Koothu-P-Pattarai, a theatre group in Chennai.

Vimal married Akshaya and they have three children together.

== Acting career ==
=== 2001–2008: Initial career ===
In 2001, he started a career as an aspiring model actor. While being a part of Koothu-P-Pattarai, Vimal was appearing in uncredited roles in several high-profile Tamil films, including Ghilli (2004), Kireedam (2007), and Kuruvi (2008). He made cameo role in the critically acclaimed movie Kanchivaram (2008).

=== 2009–2018: Leading roles and success ===
He played his first leading role in Pasanga (2009), directed by Pandiraj, in which he played Meenakshisundaram, an insurance agent. The film won critical acclaim, while his performance was well received. He next appeared in A. Sarkunam's comedy entertainer Kalavani (2010) with Oviya in the female lead which went on to become a sleeper hit. In 2011, he acted in three films, Cloud Nine Movie's Thoonga Nagaram, Eththan and Vaagai Sooda Vaa, which saw him collaborating with A. Sarkunam again. Vaagai Sooda Vaa was a period piece set in the 1960s, with Vimal playing a village teacher named Veluthambi. His other 2012 film, was Mattuthavani which was long-delayed and was a flop at the box office. He was then seen in UTV's comedy film Kalakalappu under Sundar C's direction that features an ensemble cast. His next release was Ishtam, a remake of Telugu hit Yemaindhi Ee Vela, in which he played an urban character for the first time.

In 2013, he acted five movies as Sillunu Oru Sandhippu, a simple love story, Kedi Billa Killadi Ranga co-starring with Sivakarthikeyan directed by Pandiraj. The film was a good opening and was a hit at the box office. Moondru Per Moondru Kadal with actors Arjun Sarja and Cheran directed by Vasanth. Ezhil's direction Desingu Raja was released on 23 August.Jannal Oram co-starring with R. Parthiepan and Vidharth. The film received mixed reviews from critics and audience. Vimal is currently working on more than half-a-dozen projects. He has play in Pulivaal (2014), a comedy thriller with actor Prasanna, remake of Malayalam film. He has completed Manjapai (2014) and Padmamagan's Netru Indru (2014). He was next seen an action film, Kaaval (2015), followed by two comedy dramas, Anjala (2016) and Mapla Singam (2016). In 2018, Boopathy Pandian's Mannar Vagaiyara was released. The film is produced by Vimal for the first time. It was running successful and was declared a super hit. In December, an adult comedy film, Evanukku Engeyo Matcham Irukku. It was a poor review from critics and audiences.

=== 2019–present ===
His next two films were romantic comedies including Kalavani 2 (2019), a sequel to Kalavani and Kanni Raasi (2020). Vimal was seen in the Zee5 crime thriller web series Vilangu (2022). The series, written and directed by Prashanth Pandiyaraj, started streaming in February and received extremely positive reviews. He was acted in a cameo in Vijay Sethupathi starrer DSP (2022) directed by Ponram. In 2023, he returns to the family territory in rural comedy, Deiva Machan. His next projects were action films such as Kulasami and Thudikkum Karangal. In 2024, Vimal plays the role of a morgue driver in Pogumidam Vegu Thooramillai. Follow-up to the Bose Venkat's-directed action-drama film Sir, which explores themes of social inequality and the importance of education. In 2025, Vimal appeared in five films such as Badava, Paramasivan Fathima, Desingu Raja 2, Galatta Family and Mahasenha. All of these films were disappointing to audiences. In 2026, two of these films Vadam and Sandakari was released.

== Filmography ==
Key
†	Denotes films that have not yet been released

List of Vimal film acting credits
Year	Title	Role	Notes
2001	Kalakalappu	Karna's collegemate	Uncredited role
2004	Ghilli	Velu's teammate	Uncredited role; assistant director
2007	Kireedam	Shaktivel's friend	Uncredited role
2008	Kuruvi	Refugee in Cuddapah	Uncredited role; assistant director
2008	Pandhayam	Murugesan	Uncredited role
2008	Kanchivaram	Rangan	
2008	Thenavattu	Santhosh's henchman	Uncredited role
2009	Pasanga	Meenakshi Sundaram	Vijay Award for Best Debut Actor; Ananda Vikatan Award for Best Debut Actor
2010	Kalavani	Arivazhagan (Arikki)	
2011	Thoonga Nagaram	Kannan	
2011	Eththan	Sathyamoorthy	
2011	Vaagai Sooda Vaa	Veluthambi	Tamil Nadu State Film Award for Best Actor
2012	Mattuthavani	Panneer's friend	Uncredited role
2012	Kalakalappu	Seenu	
2012	Ishtam	Saravanan	
2013	Sillunu Oru Sandhippu	Ashok	
2013	Kedi Billa Killadi Ranga	Kesavan	
2013	Moondru Per Moondru Kaadhal	Varun	
2013	Desingu Raja	Idhayakani	
2013	Jannal Oram	Subbiah	
2014	Ninaithathu Yaaro	Himself	Cameo
2014	Pulivaal	Kasi	
2014	Manjapai	Tamil	
2014	Netru Indru	Sivaji	
2014	Kathai Thiraikathai Vasanam Iyakkam	Himself	Cameo
2014	Oru Oorla Rendu Raja	Azhagu	
2015	Kaaval	Anbarasu	
2016	Anjala	Kavas	
2016	Mapla Singam	Anbuchelvan	
2018	Mannar Vagaiyara	Madhiyazhagan	Also producer
2018	Evanukku Engeyo Matcham Irukku	Hari	
2019	Kalavani 2	Arivazhagan (Arikki)	25th Film
2020	Kanni Raasi	Gemini Ganesan	
2022	DSP	Vinayagam	Cameo
2023	Deiva Machan	Thabaal Karthi	
2023	Kulasami	Soora Sangu	
2023	Thudikkum Karangal	Vetri	
2024	Pogumidam Vegu Thooramillai	Kumar	
2024	Sir	Mangollai Ponnarasan Sivagnanam "Ma. Po. Si"	
2025	Badava	Velan	
2025	Gangers	Original Saravanan	Cameo
2025	Maaman	Magician	Cameo
2025	Paramasivan Fathima	Paramasivan	
2025	Desingu Raja 2	Kulasekara Pandian	
2025	Galatta Family	Chandran	
2025	Mahasenha	Senguttuvan	
2026	Vadam	Vetrivel	
2026	Sandakari	Vetri Konda	
2026	Navoria	TBA	Completed

=== Web series ===
List of Vimal web series credits
Year	Title	Role	Channel	Notes	Ref
2022	Vilangu	Paridhi	ZEE5		
2025	Om Kali Jai Kali	Ganesan	JioHotstar		
2026	Lingam		JioHotstar	Cameo appearance	
