= Style (2002 film) =

- Directed by: Sibi Chakravarthy
- Written by: Padmamagan
- Produced by: K. Thirugnanam
- Starring: Raghava Lawrence; Ramana; Gayathri Raguram
- Cinematography: Dinesh
- Edited by: K. Pazhanivel
- Music by: Bharani
- Production company: Thiru films
- Release date: 20 December 2002
- Country: India
- Language: Tamil

Style is a 2002 Indian Tamil language film, written and directed by Sibi Chakravarthy. It stars Raghava Lawrence and Gayathri Raguram, while Ramana and Vadivelu portray supporting roles. The music for the film was composed by Bharani and the film opened on 20 December 2002.

== Cast ==
- Raghava Lawrence as Vetrivel
- Ramana as Vetri
- Gayathri Raguram as Viji
- Vadivelu as Manmadhan
- Anandaraj as Marthandam
- Ilavarasu as Pandithurai
- Vaiyapuri as Manikkam
- Chaplin Balu as Nathan
- Nalini as Vetrivel's mother
- Jyothi as Viji's mother
- Kuyili as Selvi's mother
- Junior Silk as House owner's daughter
- Sonia as Anjamma
- Payal as Selvi
- Sri Latha
- Singamuthu as House owner
- Kumarimuthu
- Thalapathy Dinesh as Marthandam's henchman
- Scissor Manohar
- Kovai Senthil as Swamy
- Krishnamoorthy as Police inspector

== Production ==
Raghava Lawrence worked on Style after completing work on Arputham (2002), and appeared in two Tamil films in quick succession. Arul, who had earlier written the script for Aranmanai Kaavalan (1994), was announced as the film's director, while Padmamagan wrote the dialogues for the film. The film was shot at Pollachi, Nellaiyampatti at Kerala, SRM College, Hindustan College and at AVM and Film City. The film marked the acting debut of Ramana, son of actor Vijay Babu.

== Soundtrack ==
The music was composeed by Bharani. The lyrics written by Pa. Vijay and Bharani (Pottu Eduthu).

Track listing
No.	Title	Singer(s)	Length
1.	"Kadhalithal Anandham"	Hariharan
2.	"Kadhalithal Anandham"	K. S. Chithra
3.	"Varuiral En"	P. Unnikrishnan
4.	"Pottu Eduthu"	Pushpavanam Kuppusamy, Swarnalatha
5.	"Style Style"	Tippu
6.	"Unakku Enna"	Unnikrishnan
7.	"Kadithamillai"	Unnikrishnan
8.	"Muzhu Nila"	Hariharan

== Release ==
The film had a low-key release during December 2002. The director of the film, Sibi Chakravarthy, later attempted to make a film with Dhanush and debutant Mamta Zaveri titled Raghava, but financial troubles stopped the production.
