= Kottapalli, Srikakulam district =

Kottapalli
- Village
- Interactive map of Kottapalli
- Location in Andhra Pradesh, India Kottapalli (India)
- Coordinates: 18.879364°N 84.525820°E
- Country: India
- State: Andhra Pradesh
- District: Srikakulam

Government
  - Type: Gram Panchayat

Population
  - Total: 954

Languages
  - Official: Telugu
- Time zone: UTC+5:30 (IST)
- PIN: 532243
- Vehicle registration: AP-30

Kottapalli is a village in Srikakulam district of the Indian state of Andhra Pradesh. It is located in Mandasa mandal, and the Mahendratanaya River flows besides the village.

== Demographics ==
Kottapalli village has population of 954 of which 468 are males while 486 are females as per Population 2011, Indian Census.
