= Kadhal Dhandapani =

Indian actor

- Born: 17 April 1943; Dindigul, Madras Province, British India (now Tamil Nadu, India)
- Died: 20 July 2014 (aged 71); Chennai, Tamil Nadu, India
- Occupation: Actor
- Years active: 2004–2014
- Spouse: Aruna
- Children: 4

Kadhal Dhandapani (17 April 1943 – 20 July 2014) was an Indian actor who appeared in predominantly Tamil films. He rose to fame portraying the antagonist in Balaji Sakthivel's Kaadhal (2004), and is credited with the film's name as a prefix.

== Career ==
Before entering films, Dhandapani was a businessman in Dindigul. Along with his various businesses, he was actively involved in various honorary postings in the town. In 2004 he was selected by film director Balaji Sakthivel to play the role of lead actress Sandhya's father in Kaadhal. This was his film breakthrough, and led to an acting career spanning more than 200 films.

Dhandapani's films include Englishkaran, Chithiram Pesuthadi, Unakkum Enakkum, Vattaram, Muni, Velayudham,and Varuthapadatha Valibar Sangam.

== Death ==
Dhandapani had a cardiac arrest and died on 20 July 2014 at the age of 71 in Chennai.

His wife Aruna died on 29 March 2011.

== Filmography ==
=== Tamil films ===
Year	Film	Role	Notes
2004	Kaadhal	Rajendran	
2005	Englishkaran	Sandhya's father	
2005	Sandakozhi		
2006	Chithiram Pesuthadi	Annachi	
2006	Pachchak Kuthira	Moneylender	
2006	Unakkum Enakkum	Sivaji	
2006	Vattaram	Iyra	
2006	Naalai	Thanikai	
2007	Muni	Dhandapani	
2007	Parattai Engira Azhagu Sundaram	Kesavan	
2007	Marudhamalai	Puli	
2007	Piragu	Antony	
2007	Malaikottai	Chairman, Pattukottai	
2007	Puli Varudhu	Vinayaga's father	
2008	Kaalai		
2008	Theekuchi	Education Minister	
2008	Sandai		
2008	Kathavarayan	Easwaran	
2009	Sindhanai Sei		
2009	Innoruvan	Aranganayagam	
2009	Iru Nadhigal	Kumaresan Gounder	
2009	Madurai Sambavam	MP Cutout Ganesan	
2009	Vaidehi	Pannaiyar	
2009	Padikkadavan		
2009	Malai Malai		
2010	Kacheri Arambam		
2010	Kutti Pisasu	Kudu Kuduppu Kullamuni	
2010	Pournami Nagam		
2010	Thillalangadi	Chandra Lakshman	
2010	Puzhal	Anbu	
2010	Tiruppur	Subramani	
2010	Neethana Avan	Manmadhan	
2011	Mappillai		
2011	Vaanam	Narasimman	
2011	Velayudham	Nattamai	
2011	Thambi Vettothi Sundaram	Mani	
2011	Poova Thalaiya		
2012	Mattuthavani		
2012	Kai	Guruji	
2012	Puthumugangal Thevai		
2013	Ops Kossa Dappa 3	Nachiappan	Malaysian film
2013	Kantha		
2013	Thiru Pugazh		
2013	Varuthapadatha Valibar Sangam	Rasu	
2013	Mouna Mazhai		
2013	Muthu Nagaram		
2013	Vizha		
2014	Kovalanin Kadhali		
2014	Kandharvan		
2014	Angusam		
2014	Aindhaam Thalaimurai Sidha Vaidhiya Sigamani		
2014	Aranmanai		
2015	Thiru.Vi.Ka.Poonga		
2015	Sandamarutham	Dhandapani	
2015	Nannbenda		
2015	Tihar		
2015	Kalai Vendhan		
2016	Meenakshi Kadhalan Ilangovan		
2016	Vidayutham	Paddi Alandhan	
2017	Unnai Thottu Kolla Vaa		
2017	En Kadhal Devathai		
2020	Onbathu Kuzhi Sampath		

=== Telugu films ===
Year	Film	Role
2007	Raju Bhai	Babaji
2008	Krishna	Lanka Raju
2009	Naa Style Veru	MLA Bhupathi
2009	Anjaneyulu	MLA
2010	Police Police	Janardhan
2010	Cara Majaka	
2010	Chapter 6	
2014	Race Gurram	Lucky's ex's father

=== Kannada films ===
Year	Film	Role
2009	Rajani	Lanka Raju
2010	Bombat Car	
2010	Eno Onthara	
2010	Super	Chief Minister
2012	Parijatha	Financer/Rowdy

=== Malayalam films ===
Year	Film	Role
2005	Rajamanikyam	Perumal
2010	Pokkiri Raja	Parthasarathy
