= Ivan Thanthiran =

2017 Indian film by R. Kannan

- Poster
- Directed by: R. Kannan
- Written by: R. Kannan
- Produced by: R. Kannan; M. K. Ramprasad
- Starring: Gautham Ram Karthik; Shraddha Srinath; RJ Balaji
- Cinematography: Prasanna Kumar
- Edited by: R. K. Selva
- Music by: S. Thaman
- Production companies: Masala Pix; M.K.R.P Productions
- Release date: 30 June 2017
- Country: India
- Language: Tamil

Ivan Thanthiran (transl. He is a Strategist) is a 2017 Indian Tamil-language action thriller film written and directed by R. Kannan. The film features Gautham Ram Karthik and Shraddha Srinath in the lead roles, while RJ Balaji and Super Subbarayan play supporting roles. S. Thaman composed the film's music, while Prasanna Kumar handled the cinematography and Selva RK did the editing. The film released on 30 June 2017 to positive reviews and eventually became a sleeper hit success.

== Plot ==
Two engineering college dropouts and best friends, Sakthi (Gautham Karthik) and Balaji (RJ Balaji) start a shop in Richie street to sell assembled electronic products. Sakthi, who understands the electronic functionalities well, reverse engineers the products and sells them in their shop. Sakthi has also developed a mobile phone which can be assembled by unique parts and thus be heavily custom modified. He meets a final-year engineering student named Asha (Shraddha Srinath), who buys a laptop from him and later claims that he cheated her. They quarrel and later get on and fall in love. She even gets Sakthi's project accepted in a national electronics firm, for mass production in near future. One day, they get a job to fix CCTV cameras in a wealthy man's house. While fixing the job, Sakthi learns that the house belongs to the central Education-HRD Minister Devaraj (Super Subbarayan). Despite properly fixing the CCTV cameras, they are not paid and are insulted.

Meanwhile, Devaraj orders to close several engineering colleges, citing that they do not have either facilities or the required staff power, and around 10 colleges are closed in Chennai. Within 10 days, he approves the colleges which pay him astronomical bribes. As a result, engineering colleges are forced to collect extra fees from the students to match up to Devaraj's bribe. The students from financially weak families are unable to pay last-minute fees as the year end semester is nearing. One such student of final-year commits suicide by touching the live wire on the electric train in front of Sakthi and others. Later, Sakthi realizes that the reason behind the suicide is the bribe paid to Devaraj.

Sakthi uses his technological skills to expose Devaraj's bribe racket through social media and with the help of Balaji and an ally, Gopi ("Kabali" Hari Krishnan), who received a standing ovation for his project in electronics but ends up working as a waiter in a restaurant due to the antics of the politicians and society. He designs an electronic surveillance bug in the guise of a housefly and sends it to the place where Devaraj stores his newfound bribe. Arul (Stunt Silva), Devaraj's brother-in-law, is captured on screen with the cash, and the video goes viral. Though Arul denies any involvement of Devaraj, the media outrage causes the Prime Minister to fire Devaraj from the minister post. Now, Devaraj has to prove himself innocent, so he kills Arul when he was about to reveal Sakthi's name to him. Later, Devaraj captures Sakthi and Asha and assaults Sakthi, but Sakthi tricks Devaraj into revealing the locations of all of his black money, which is recorded by hidden cameras in Asha's house. They engage in a fight where Sakthi kills Devaraj. Sakthi then transmits the footage to the CBI and is lauded for his efforts. He takes a small amount from the confiscated money as his CCTV charges and is reunited with Asha and Balaji.

== Cast ==
- Gautham Karthik as Shakthi
- Shraddha Srinath as Asha Subramaniam (Voice dubbed by Chinmayi)
- RJ Balaji as Balaji
- Super Subbarayan as Minister Devaraj
- Mayilsamy as Theatre Owner
- Madhan Bob as Partner
- Hari Krishnan as Gopi
- S. Sri Vignesh
- Stunt Silva as Arul, Devaraj's brother-in-law
- Bharath Reddy as Bharath, Devaraj's goon and nephew
- Pondy Ravi as Devaraj's right hand
- Suhin Babu
- Prem
- Senthil
- Venkat Subha as Nadhamuni
- C. Ranganathan as professor
- Neelakandan as Ericon Technologies Managing director
- Shankar Sundaram as CBI officer
- Kayal Devaraj as Murugan's father
- Gowthami Vembunathan as Murugan's mother
- Giri Dwarakish as Cyber Security M. D.
- Supergood Subramani as Bhai

Uncredited

- Tharshan as a Sun TV reporter and NDTVHindu news anchor
- Rahul Thatha as Traffic Kumarasamy

== Production ==
In August 2016, R. Kannan revealed that his next film would feature Gautham Karthik in the lead role and would be an "action-thriller" set in Chennai. The team initially considered Anupama Parameswaran to play the leading female role, but later opted for Shraddha Srinath, who would make her debut in Tamil films through the project. Playback singer Chinmayi Sripada dubbed for Shraddha in this film. The film began production in mid-August 2016, after a launch ceremony was held. Kannan revealed that the team hoped to finish the film in a single schedule. Chennai-based model Archana Sree and comedian RJ Balaji joined the film's cast during September 2016. This film may be remade in Telugu.

== Music ==
The music was composed by S. Thaman in his third collaboration with director Kannan after Vandhaan Vendraan and Settai.

Ivan Thanthiran

Soundtrack album by S. Thaman
- Released: 12 June 2017
- Recorded: 2017
- Genre: Film soundtrack
- Length: 16:34
- Language: Tamil
- Labels: Junglee Music; Powered by Times Group
- Producer: Junglee Music

S. Thaman chronology
Winner (2017)	Ivan Thanthiran (2017)	Yaar Ivan (2017)

Track list
No.	Title	Lyrics	Singer(s)	Length
1.	"Dagalti Dagalti"	Arunraja kamaraj	Rahul Nambiar	04:58
2.	"Ivan Ivan thanthiran"	Vivek	Deepak, Yazin	05:12
3.	"Medhakavitta Medhakavitta"	Vivek	Sanjana Kalmanjie, Yazin	04:18
4.	"Ivan thanthiran (Theme)"	Vivek	S. Thaman	02:06
Total length:				16:34

== Release and reception ==
The film was distributed by Creative entertainments and distributors in 244 theatres in Tamil Nadu and 323 theatres overall in India. The satellite rights of the film were sold to Zee Tamil.

=== Critical reception ===
Ivan Thanthiran received highly positive reviews from critics upon release, with calling it "the director's best in recent years" in their initial review round-up. Srinivasa Ramanujam of The Hindu wrote, Ivan Thanthiran A fairly engaging thriller that revolves around the lives of engineering students. while also singling out Gautham Karthik, Shraddha Srinath and RJ Balaji's performance for praise. Jyothi Prabhakar of Times Of India wrote 'We can willingly suspend disbelief for two hours of sharp and spiffy entertainment now, can't we? Go watch' TOI Rating for the movie Ivan Thanthiran is 3.5/5 Anupama Subramanian of Deccan chronicle wrote Ivan Thanthiran a classic in the making, but rarely does anyone set out to watch a new film having such standards in mind. Just go to the theatres and enjoy a nice mid-summer hiatus. DC rating for the movie Ivan Thanthiran is 3.0/5 Baradwaj Rangan of Film Companion wrote "The director, R. Kannan, has no idea how to stage a scene and push our buttons."

== Sequel ==
A standalone sequel, Ivan Thanthiran 2, was announced in 2024. The film stars Saran Shakthi, Thambi Ramaiah, Redin Kingsley and Samuthirakani in lead roles.
