= Settai (film) =

2013 Indian film by R. Kannan

- Theatrical release poster
- Directed by: R. Kannan
- Written by: John Mahendran (dialogues)
- Screenplay by: G. Dhananjayan; John Mahendran; R. Kannan
- Story by: Akshat Verma
- Based on: Delhi Belly by Abhinay Deo
- Produced by: Ronnie Screwvala; Siddharth Roy Kapur
- Starring: Arya; Anjali; Santhanam; Premji; Hansika Motwani
- Cinematography: P. G. Muthiah
- Edited by: Leo John Paul
- Music by: S. Thaman
- Production company: UTV Motion Pictures
- Distributed by: UTV Motion Pictures
- Release date: 5 April 2013
- Running time: 136 minutes
- Country: India
- Language: Tamil

Settai (transl. Mischief) is a 2013 Indian Tamil-language action comedy film directed by R. Kannan. A remake of the 2011 Hindi-English-language film, Delhi Belly, it stars Arya, Santhanam, Premji, Hansika Motwani and Anjali. The film, which began filming in Chennai on 7 July 2012, released for April 2013. The audio was launched on 30 January. The film released on 5 April 2013.

== Plot ==
Journalist Jayakanthan, photographer Nagaraj and Cheenu are roommates leading an unkempt and debt-ridden life in a shoddy apartment in Mumbai. J.K.'s ditsy fiancée, Madhumita, is an air hostess who agrees to deliver a package for Richard to Guna, without realizing its contents or that Guna is a crime boss. Madhumita asks J.K. to deliver the package. J.K., in turn, asks Nagaraj to do so. But Nagaraj is unable to do so as he is experiencing diarrhea after eating Ileana Chicken from a roadside eatery. Nagaraj hands Madhumita's package to Cheenu for delivery to Guna, along with a package containing his stool sample for delivery to Nagaraj's doctor. Cheenu mixes up the two packages which makes Guna furious and he starts the investigation by interrogating Richard.

Meanwhile, Nagaraj photographs his landlord with a prostitute. He sends an envelope with the photographs to his landlord to blackmail him. J.K. is with Madhumita, and his colleague Shakthi calls him on the pretext of work. When he reaches the place, he realizes that it is just a party and Shakthi called him just to have fun. Rajeev, supposedly Shakthi's ex-husband, sees them together and gives J.K. a black-eye in a fit of jealousy. J.K. retaliates and knocks Rajeev out. As J.K. and Shakthi leave, they are chased by a furious Rajeev who shoot at them. The duo barely manages to escape.

Richard informs Guna that the mix-up must have been caused by Madhumita as she did not know what she was carrying in the package. Guna calls Madhumita, informs her about the mix-up and asks her to give him the address of the person who had delivered the package. When J.K. arrives into his apartment, he walks into Guna, who has Cheenu standing on a stool with a noose around his neck. On a very hard interrogation, Guna discovers the mix-up and realizes that the package must be with Nagaraj's doctor.

Nagaraj gets the package from his doctor's office, wherein Guna finds his thirty diamonds hidden inside. Upon recovering his booty, he orders his henchmen to kill the three roommates. One of them is about to shoot J.K., when another kicks the stool on which Cheenu was standing to hang him. Luckily for the roommates, the ceiling of the apartment caves in, since it cannot take Cheenu's weight. The cave-in injures and knocks-out Guna and his men. J.K., Cheenu and Nagaraj escape along with the diamonds and spend the night at Shakthi's place. The next day they sell the diamonds to a local jeweler.

As the roommates prepare to get out of town with the money, they get a call from Guna, who has kidnapped Madhumita. He threatens to kill her, if they do not return the diamonds. The trio, try to buy back the diamonds from the jewelry store, who demands a double payment for the sale amount.

Without the money, J.K. comes up with a plan. Nagaraj, Cheenu, J.K. and Shakthi disguise themselves as burglars and go back to the jewelry store. They con the owner, gag him and forcefully take back their diamonds and return his money. They make their get-away in J.K.'s car with the police on their tail and make their way to the hotel where Guna is holding Madhumita. As they are about to make the exchange with Guna, the police arrive at the hotel room. There is a shoot-out between the police and Guna's gang.

Nagaraj, Cheenu, J.K, Madhumitha and Richard who have hit the floor during the gunfight, are left as the only sole survivors. Shakthi is upset to learn about J.K.'s engagement and walks away from him. J.K. breaks off his engagement to Madhumitha. Later, it is revealed that Nagaraj did not return the cash to the jewelry store owner, and had kept the money for himself. The film ends when Shakthi comes to the roommates' apartment to return J.K.'s car's hubcap lost while escaping from Rajeev. J.K. jumps into her car through the open window and kisses her passionately.

== Cast ==
- Arya as Jayakanthan
- Hansika Motwani as Madhumitha
- Anjali as Shakthi
- Santhanam as Nagaraj aka Nadupakka Nakki
- Premji as Cheenu
- Nassar as Guna
- Manobala as Gourishankar
- Sayaji Shinde as Jewellery owner
- Ali as House owner
- Chitra Lakshmanan as Murugaraj
- K. Bujji Babu as Senior press reporter
- Subbu Panchu as Commissioner Vijaykumar
- Balaji Venugopal as Neelakantan
- Ashwin Mushran as Richard
- Suja Varunee as Actress in caravan
- Nakshathra Nagesh as Gayathri
- Shankar Sundaram as Aadhi Bhagavan
- Rajee Vijay Sarathy as Madhumitha's mother
- Rajiv Chaudhary as Madhumitha's father
- Pradeep Kabra as Guna's henchman
- Arun Matheswaran as Guna's henchman
- A. R. Manikandan as Hotel Waiter
- Neetu Chandra as item number "Laila Laila"
- Kalyani Natarajan as House Owner (uncredited)

== Production ==
=== Casting ===
After UTV Motion Pictures announced that the studio will be remaking the Hindi-language film Delhi Belly in Tamil, R. Kannan, who had earlier directed Jayam Kondaan and Kanden Kadhalai, was selected as the director. G. Dhananjayan, South Business chief of UTV, stated that, unlike the original version, which received an adult rating, the remake would be made for a family audience, making clear that the core plot would be retained, while the dialogue would be changed and "risque jokes" be avoided. Dhananjayan further added that he, Kannan and John Mahendran (director of Sachein and son of award-winning director Mahendran) would be credited for additional screenplay and adaption, while the latter would write the new dialogues as well. Varuthapadaatha Vaalibar Sangam and Vai Raja Vai were amongst the suggested titles for the film, with the team eventually zeroing in on Settai. Arya, Santhanam and Premji were selected to play the three lead roles. Vijay Raaz, who portrayed the main antagonist in Delhi Belly, was approached to reprise his role. His role later went to Nassar. Suja Varunee was cast to appear in a cameo role which was played by Anusha Dandekar in the original. Telugu comedian Ali joined the cast and plays the trio's landlord.

=== Filming ===
The film was launched on 7 May 2012 in Chennai. Two huge sets resembling a hotel and a bachelor's room were reportedly constructed for the shoot. The first schedule got over after 20 days of shoot in three differently constructed sets. Arya, Hansika and Anjali along with the crew will be leaving for Switzerland on 23 September to shoot two songs over there. According to Kannan, 75% of the film has been shot and the film is gearing up for a December release.

== Soundtrack ==
Settai

Soundtrack album by S. Thaman
- Released: 30 January 2013
- Recorded: 2013
- Genre: Feature film soundtrack
- Length: 19:17
- Label: Sony Music Entertainment
- Producer: S. Thaman

S. Thaman chronology
Naayak (2012)	Settai (2013)	Jabardasth; Singam II (2013)

The soundtrack album comprises six tracks composed by S. Thaman uniting with director Kannan for the second time after Vanthaan Vendraan and with Arya for the first time. The album was released on 30 January 2013.

Track-List
No.	Title	Lyrics	Singer(s)	Length
1.	"Agalathey Agalathey"	Madhan Karky	Vijay Prakash, Megha	03:48
2.	"Nee Thaane Osthi Ponna"	Gaana Bala	Gaana Bala	02:42
3.	"Arjuna Arjuna"	Thamarai	Karthik, Suchitra	03:35
4.	"Laila Laila"	Na. Muthukumar	Andrea Jeremiah	03:51
5.	"Poyum Poyum Indha Kadhalukkulle"	Madhan Karky	Haricharan, Chinmayi	03:42
6.	"Theme Music" (Instrumental)		Devan Ekambaram & Anbu Raju	01:39
Total length:				19:17

== Release ==
=== Critical reception ===
S Saraswathi of Rediff gave the film 2 stars out of 5 and said: "Settai is, sadly, a great disappointment ... The director has ruined a perfectly good script and has given an absolutely boring version of the exciting and racy Delhi Belly. From beginning to end, the film follows the same pace and all the scenes are so boring and slow, you could actually sleep through the entire movie." in.com rated it 2.5 out of 5 and stated "Settai is watered down version of Delhi Belly and lacks the punch of the original". Baradwaj Rangan of The Hindu wrote "Those who haven’t seen Delhi Belly will probably find all this fresh, while for the rest of us the sole saving grace is Santhanam’s brand of comedy...the rhyming gags aren’t exactly new, but the zingers keep coming at such a pace that even with a fifty per cent success rate, we’re still left with some amusement. He’s labelled “Comedy Super Star,” and for once the hype seems justified."

=== Box office ===
In Malaysia, the film grossed $280,086 in four weeks.

=== Controversy ===
RJ Balaji who reviewed the movie on SoundCloud tweeted he got threatening calls from UTV employee.
