= Oru Oorla Rendu Raja =

- Film poster
- Directed by: R. Kannan
- Written by: R. Kannan
- Screenplay by: R. Kannan
- Story by: R. Kannan
- Produced by: S. Michael Rayappan; M. Sheraphin Xavier; R. Kannan
- Starring: Vimal; Priya Anand; Soori
- Cinematography: P. G. Muthiah
- Edited by: Sathish Suriya
- Music by: D. Imman
- Production company: Kannan Pix
- Distributed by: Global Infotainment
- Release date: 7 November 2014
- Running time: 132 minutes
- Country: India
- Language: Tamil

Oru Oorla Rendu Raja (transl. Two kings in a town) is a 2014 Indian Tamil-language comedy film written and directed by R. Kannan and produced by S. Michael Rayappan. The film stars Vimal, Priya Anand and Soori, while Nassar, Anupama Kumar and Thambi Ramaiah form the supporting cast and D. Imman composes the film's music. The film was released on 7 November 2014.

== Plot ==
Azhagu (Vimal) and Mike (Soori) are thick friends and happy-go-lucky jobless youths who just roam around doing nothing. They meet Priya (Priya Anand) in a train while trying to escape from a few goons who were chasing them for a reason. Initially, they take Priya for a prostitute but later understand that she is a doctor. Azhagu falls for her immediately and decides that he should become an engineer so that he can marry her. Priya is saved by Azhagu from a man who tries to kill her. Azhagu then listens to her story.

Priya had a friend named Kalpana (Vishakha Singh), who was from a village where Priya went for a medical camp. There, she learns that the people of that village are affected by potential cancer and other effects due to the steel factory owned by Selva Vinayagam (Nassar). Priya enters the company with the help of Kalpana, who works there. Priya gathers proof and talks with Selva to provide safety equipment to the workers so that no one gets affected further. However, Selva denies and insults Priya, who leaves the place. Back in the factory, Kalpana operates a costly machine and unfortunately gets her hand stuck in it, resulting in huge blood loss. Priya begs the owners to dismantle the machine so that Kalpana can be saved, but the owners are reluctant, and Kalpana dies as a result. Priya decides to sue the company and files a case against them. The case is being heard the next day, and if Priya makes it to court, the company will lose the case. She is being targeted by Selva's men. How Azhagu and Mike help Priya escape the goons and whether they help her win the case forms the rest of the story.

The story is centered on a factory in Kayalpattinam (Thoothukudi) which explores the safety of laborers in factories being at jeopardy. It was a noble effort by Kannan to have raised an awareness and caution to incorporate safety standards in order to avoid any untoward incident that may harm the laborers' lives and lifestyle through this film. After the film's release, one of the most fatal incidents due to oversight in the industrial safety measures happened at Ranipet Sipcot industrial estate in Vellore district when a tank of an effluent treatment plant collapsed on the compound wall of an adjacent factory where the employees were present. 10 workers died as a result of this incident.

== Cast ==
- Vimal as Azhagu
- Priya Anand as Priya
- Soori as Michael (Mike)
- Nassar as Selva Vinayagam
- Anupama Kumar as Selva's wife
- Thambi Ramaiah as Good Samaritan
- Bala Singh as Priya's father
- Singamuthu as Train Passenger
- George Maryan as Factory Worker
- Stunt Silva as Contract Killer
- Sasha as Valarmathy
- Kalairani as Valarmathy's grandmother
- E. Ramdoss
- Pondy Ravi as Police Officer
- Narendra Khatri as Railway Policeman
- Jenny
- Gauthami
- Theni Murugan
- Supergood Subramani
- Vishakha Singh as Kalpana (Guest appearance)
- Kamala Krishnaswamy as Kalpana's mother
- Ineya as Item girl

== Production ==
After the release of his previous directorial Settai, R. Kannan was approached to direct Vallavanukku Pullum Aayudham, but Kannan opted out of the film as he was unhappy on first copy production agreement, he then announced that his next directorial would have Karthi in lead role titled "Alangaram" but the project got shelved. In early November 2013, Kannan announced that his next venture would feature Vimal in the lead role and would be produced by S. Michael Rayappan. Kannan revealed that the film will have a rural background with Vimal playing an educated youth from a farming family and the troubles he gets into due to his energetic nature. Later in that month, Priya Anand was signed on to play an "educated girl who hails from Madurai", with Sathish also added to the cast. Filming started in December 2013 on a train, with a photo shoot also being held with the three actors.

The team had revealed that they had registered two potential titles for the film, Sakkarai and Kaadhal Konjam Kammi, but opted to go with the latter as they felt the former may have created confusion with a Tamil film that had released earlier, Sakkarakatti (2008). In a significant change, Soori was signed on to replace Sathish in the supporting role and subsequently the team chose to rename the film as Oru Oorla Rendu Raja, to make most of Soori's presence in the venture. Malaysian Tamil actress Shasha Sri who had done small roles in films like Kanden Kadhalai and Paiyaa accepted to play the role a "bubbly village belle" opposite Soori. In April, director Kannan said that Vishakha Singh, who acted alongside Priya Anand in Fukrey (2013), had been signed for an important role in the film, albeit a cameo role. Ineya was selected to dance for a special number in the film, after talks with Sunny Leone and Neetu Chandra were unsuccessful.

== Soundtrack ==
The film's music was composed by D. Imman collaborating for first time with director Kannan. Actress Lakshmi Menon made her debut as playback singer with this project.

Oru Oorla Rendu Raja

Soundtrack album by D. Imman
- Released: 2014
- Genre: Feature film soundtrack
- Language: Tamil
- Label: Sony Music

D. Imman chronology
Jeeva (2014)	Oru Oorla Rendu Raja (2014)	Kayal (2014)

Songs	Singers	Lyricist
"Kukkuru Kukkuru"	Sathyan, Lakshmi Menon	Eknaath
"Mazhakaatha"	Haricharan, Vandana Srinivasan, Maria Roe Vincent	Yugabharathi
"Odum Rail"	Abhay Jodhpurkar	Yugabharathi
"Oru Oorla"	MK Balaji, Jayamoorthy	Yugabharathi
"Sundari Penne"	Shreya Ghoshal	Yugabharathi

== Release ==
The satellite rights of the film were sold to Polimer.

== Critical reception ==
The Hindu wrote, "The film arrives close on the heels of Kaththi with its anti-corporation sentiment. To make the package look more appealing, the film has a love angle, a comedy track, and duets, unconvincing, unfunny, and pace-hampering, respectively...the crux of the film, is sandwiched between so many bad comedy set pieces that you can't help but be disappointed, as you'd be when you bite through the flaky crust of a chicken puff to discover that it contains very little meat inside", summing up that "Oru Oorla Rendu Raja is that inefficient employee in the company you are uncomfortable about firing because he is such a well-meaning fellow otherwise". The Times of India gave the film 2.5 stars out of 5 and wrote, "Oru Oorula Rendu Raja wants to be a well intentioned message movie but sadly, the message is lost because of the lack of focus in the script. Kannan wants to give us a comedy as well and that dilutes the seriousness of the plot". The New Indian Express wrote, "Oru Oorla Rendu Raja, though scripted by him (Kannan), gives a sense of déjâ vu throughout...The film maintains a light tone throughout, even when the situation demands a more serious approach. With a weak villain and a pair of unlikely heroes, Oru Oorule... lacks the punch and fritz to make it a riveting road journey for a cause".

Deccan Chronicle gave 2.5 stars out of 5 and wrote, "the film fails to impress because of a lacklustre script and screenplay. OORR portrays a cause worth fighting for, but it lacks that knack which good teachers have, which is to teach uninteresting concepts in an exciting manner. It can be enjoyed only in parts". Rediff gave 1.5 stars out of 5 and wrote, "The film does have an interesting plot, but the director's weakly-sketched characters fail to make any impact despite the gravity of the situation. The hackneyed climax, lackluster performances, tiresome comedy, unexciting music coupled with the director's inept execution makes Oru Oorla Rendu Raja a total waste of time". Sify wrote, "Oru Oorla Rendu Raja is old wine in new bottle. It's a story that has been told a hundred times, this time with new set of actors. Kannan must have written his script on the sets and changed it according to the packaging". Indiaglitz gave it 1.5 out of 5 and called it "A spiritless commercial movie made with a tinge of social message to convince the viewers that there is something called story in it". Cinemalead gave a 2 out of 5 and wrote," One city two kings. One review two stars."
