= P. G. Muthiah =

Indian director

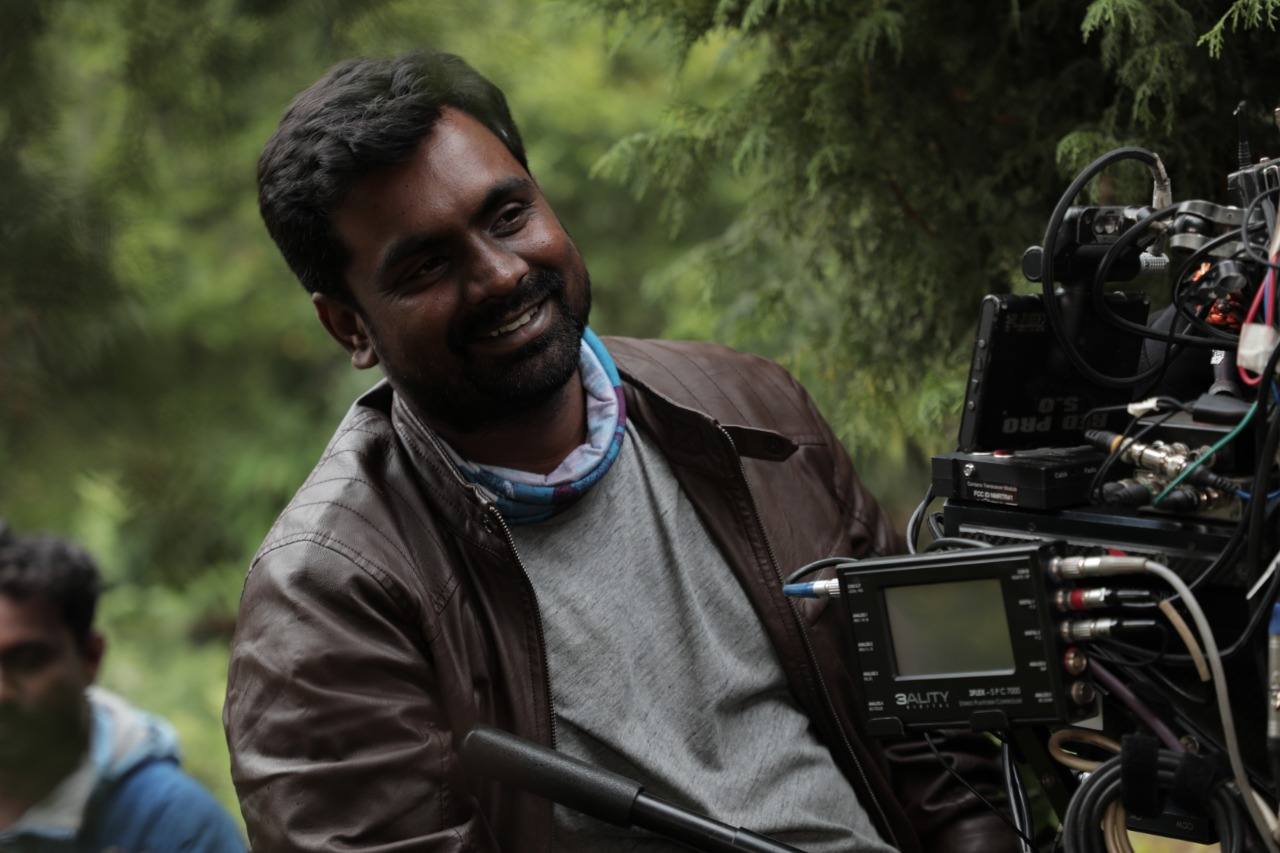
- Born: Muthiah Gopalaratnam; Alathudaiyanpatti, Tiruchirapalli district, Tamil Nadu, India
- Education: BSc Viscom, SRM Institute of Science and Technology
- Occupations: Director of photography Film Director; Film Producer

P. G. Muthiah is an Indian director, cinematographer and film producer, who has been working in the Tamil film industry.

== Career ==
Muthiah has started his career as cinematographer in the movie Poo (2008) which won Tamil Nadu state awards and Kanden Kadhalai (2009), often collaborating in ventures by director R. Kannan. In 2015, Muthiah decided to produce films and financed three low budget drama films — Raja Manthiri (2016) and Peechankai (2017) — through his studio, PG Media Works. In 2018, he directed and produced the movie Madura Veeran starring Shanmuga Pandian and Samuthirakani.

== Filmography ==
- Note: all films are in Tamil, unless otherwise noted.

Year	Title	Producer	Cinematographer	Notes	Ref
2008	Poo		Yes		
2009	Kanden Kadhalai		Yes		
2010	Aval Peyar Thamizharasi		Yes		
2010	Shambo Shiva Shambo		Yes	Telugu film	
2011	Vandhaan Vendraan		Yes		
2012	Saguni		Yes	Cameo appearance	
2013	Settai		Yes		
2014	Aindhaam Thalaimurai Sidha Vaidhiya Sigamani		Yes	Cameo appearance	
2014	Oru Oorla Rendu Raja		Yes		
2015	Chandi Veeran		Yes		
2016	Raja Manthiri	Yes	Yes		
2017	Peechankai	Yes			
2018	Mannar Vagaiyara		Yes		
2018	Madura Veeran	Yes	Yes	Also director and screenwriter; cameo appearance	
2018	Marainthirunthu Paarkum Marmam Enna		Yes		
2019	Lisaa	Yes	Yes		
2019	Sixer		Yes		
2020	Cocktail	Yes			
2020	Danny	Yes			
2022	Dejavu	Yes	Yes		
2023	Love		Yes		
2024	Sattam En Kaiyil		Yes		
2026	Kolaiseval		Yes		
2026	TN 2026		Yes		
2026	Love Oh Love		Yes		
