= Pattukkottai Prabakar =

Indian Tamil writer (born 1958)

Pattukottai Prabakar
- Born: 30 July 1958 (age 68); Pattukkottai, Tamil Nadu, India
- Occupations: Tamil novelist and film script writer
- Parent(s): Father: Radhakrishnan; Mother: Chandra
- Writing career
- Language: Tamil
- Genres: Crime, Detective
- Notable works: Books - Bharath Susila, Kanavugal ilavasam, Irandu vari kaviyam Films - Samurai, Jeyam Kondan, Imaikka nodigal, Naan avan illai, Kandaen Kadhalai Mega serials - Gopuram, Varam, Paramapadham

Pattukkottai Prabakar is an Indian Tamil writer. He is known for his crime and thriller novels. Apart from print media, He is also a screenwriter for movies as well as TV. Pattukkottai Prabakar was born to Shri. V. Radhakrishnan and Smt.R.Chandra on 30 July 1958. He completed his master's in economics in St.Joseph's college, Trichy. He pursued his career as a writer.

== Career ==
His debut as an author was in 1977, when his work was published in Ananda Vikatan. He has penned 250+ short stories, 300+ novels, 85+ serial stories. More than 200 works has been published by several publishers as special edition books. A monthly magazine named A novel time was publishing only his novels. His famous works are Bharath Susila Detective series. His versatility has taken his works to other languages too. He ran Ungal junior and Ullasa Oonjal monthly magazines for ten years. He has worked as assistant director and assisted in making scripts for 2 films with director Mr.K. Bhagyaraj in Avasara Police 100 and Pavunnu Pavunuthan He has contributed towards the script and dialogues for up to 25 Tamil films. He has also worked for Paramapadham, the first Tamil-language "mega-serial" telecasted on Doordarshan. He continued to contribute on small screen mega serials.

== Notable works ==
The detective series Bharath and Susila is the most popular novels amongst his fans. He has written more than 15 novels with only dialogues and no narration. His works like Maram and Kanavugal ilavasam are part of literature syllabus in private colleges and three M.Phil scholars have written a thesis on his writings. "Irandu vari kaviyam" is a Thirukural book that explains each kural in two simple lines. 7 of his short stories were telecasted as single episodes in Sun TV, directed by director Balu Mahendra (Kathai Neram).

== Filmography ==
- All films are in Tamil, unless otherwise noted.

Year	Title	Director	Role	Note
1996	Mahaprabhu	A. Venkatesh	Dialogues	
1997	Rettai Jadai Vayasu	Siva kumar	Dialogues	
1998	Priyamudan	Vincent Selva	Dialogues	
2001	Chocolate	A. Venkatesh	Dialogues	
2002	Samurai	Balaji Sakthivel	Dialogues	
2002	Bagavathi	A. Venkatesh	Dialogues	
2002	Maaran	Jawahar	Dialogues	
2003	Wrong number	NS Shankar	Story	Kannada film
2004	Kadhal Dot Com	Selvaraj	Dialogues	
2004	Aai	A. Venkatesh	Dialogues	
2007	Sabari	Suresh	Dialogues	
2007	Naan Avan Illai	Selva	Dialogues	
2008	Jeyam Kondaan	R. Kannan	Dialogues	
2008	Sila Nerangalil	Jayaraj	Dialogues	
2008	Singa Kutty	A. Venkatesh	Dialogues	
2008	Nepali	V. Z. Durai	Dialogues	
2009	Kanden Kadhalai	R. Kannan	Dialogues	
2009	Naan Avanillai 2	Selva	Dialogues	
2009	Malai Malai	A. Venkatesh	Dialogues	
2010	Vaadaa	A. Venkatesh	Dialogues	
2010	Maanja Velu	A. Venkatesh	Dialogues	
2011	Vanthaan Vendraan	R. Kannan	Dialogues	
2015	Kaaki Sattai	R. S. Durai Senthilkumar	Dialogues	
2015	Killadi	A. Venkatesh	Dialogues	
2018	Imaikkaa Nodigal	Ajay Gnanamuthu	Dialogues	
2019	Kaappaan	K. V. Anand	Story and Screenplay	
2022	The Legend	J. D.–Jerry	Dialogues	

== Television ==
Title	Channel	Type	Episodes	Note
Kathai Neram	Sun TV	7 short stories		
Kanavugal Ilavasam	Doordarshan	Social serial	18	
Paramapadham	Doordarshan	Mega serial	210	
Jeyipathu Nijam	Sun TV	Thriller serial	60	
Gopuram	Sun TV	Mega serial	320	
Varam	Sun TV	Mega serial	260	
Kalyanam	Sun TV	Mega serial	150	
Muga Manaslu	Zee Telugu	Mega serial		Telugu serial

== See also ==
- dinamalar
- Pattukottai Prabakar novels are available as e-books at Pustaka
