= Thug Life (soundtrack) =

2025 soundtrack album by A. R. Rahman

- Soundtrack album cover

Soundtrack album by A. R. Rahman
- Released: 24 May 2025
- Recorded: June—August 2024
- Studios: Panchathan Record Inn and AM Studios, Chennai
- Genre: Feature film soundtrack
- Length: 34:07
- Language: Tamil
- Label: Saregama
- Producer: A. R. Rahman

A. R. Rahman chronology
Chhaava (2025)	Thug Life (2025)	Peddi (2026)

Thug Life is the soundtrack album composed by A. R. Rahman for the 2025 film of the same name directed by Mani Ratnam, who co-wrote and co-produced it with the lead actor, Kamal Haasan, thus marking Ratnam and Hassan's reunion after Nayakan (1987). The film also stars Silambarasan, Aishwarya Lekshmi and Trisha Krishnan.

The album featured nine songs, with two of them being previously released as singles. It was initially planned to be released on 16 May 2025, which would have coincided with the audio launch event in Chennai, before its delay to 24 May. The album was released that day via Saregama.

== Production ==
Thug Life's soundtrack is composed by A. R. Rahman, in his third collaboration with Haasan after Indian (1996) and Thenali (2000); and nineteenth with Ratnam.

The songs were written by Haasan, Siva Ananth, Rahman, Shuba, Karthik Netha, Paal Dabba, and thoughtsfornow. The songs were recorded during June—August 2024. Initially, it was reported that the soundtrack would have six songs. However, the makers announced that the film would have a total of eight songs and a reprise.

Ratnam stated that the script initially needed only five songs, due to the audience's attention span having been reduced, but Rahman himself added four more songs. Haasan stated the lyrics for the song, "Jinguchaa", were completed within an hour, and the song was produced in just a couple of hours. He also stated that the initial inspirations for the song came from Rahman, who provided the opening phrase and title "Jinguchaa", which led to the development of the rest of the lyrics. Rahman stated that the song replaced a previously approved track after he presented the new composition and phrase to Haasan, who agreed the change. Netha stated that Rahman suggested the title "Space Hero" and he translated it into Tamil, "Vinveli Nayaga", and wrote the lyrics starting from there to match the rhythm and tone of the track. Netha also stated that he wrote the lyrics for "Anju Vanna Poove", a lullaby that reflects a mother's love, with inspiration from his personal memories of his mother and son.

== Release ==
Before the album's release, two of the songs—"Jinguchaa" and "Sugar Baby"—released as singles.

The soundtrack was released on 24 May 2025. The album consisted of the aforementioned songs, along with "Muththa Mazhai", "Vinveli Nayaga", "Anju Vanna Poove", "O Maara", "Engayo", "Let's Play" and "Anju Vanna Poove (Reprise)". "Muththa Mazhai (Reprise)" was later included to the soundtrack after the live performance by Chinmayi at the audio launch received widespread critical acclaim and an urge from the audience to include it in the album. Although a song was sung by Sneha Shankar for the album, it was not released along with the album.

=== Singles ===
"King of Thugs", the first track composed for Thug Life, was featured in the two-minute promo video. The song was performed by Nakul Abhyankar, Amina Rafiq, Deepthi Suresh, Rakshita Suresh and Alexandra Joy, and was released on streaming platforms on 22 April 2024, albeit not being an official single on the album.

"Jinguchaa" was the first single of the film, sung by Vaishali Samant, Shakthisree Gopalan and Adhitya RK. The song was released on 18 April 2025.

The second single "Sugar Baby" was sung by Alexandra Joy, Sarath Santosh and Shuba, the latter performing rap portions.

=== Audio launch ===
On 18 April 2025, Haasan announced that an audio launch event would be held on 16 May at Nehru Indoor Stadium in Chennai. On 9 May, however, he announced that the event was postponed due to ongoing 2025 India–Pakistan conflict. Almost a week later, he confirmed that the event would be held on 24 May. The event indefinitely took place, with the songs being performed and eventually launched.

== Track listing ==
=== Tamil ===
No.	Title	Lyrics	Singer(s)	Length
1.	"Jinguchaa"	Kamal Haasan	Vaishali Samant, Shakthisree Gopalan, Adithya RK	4:35
2.	"Sugar Baby"	Siva Ananth, A. R. Rahman, Shuba	Alexandra Joy, Shuba, Sarath Santhosh	3:31
3.	"Muththa Mazhai"	Siva Ananth	Dhee	4:01
4.	"Vinveli Nayaga"	Karthik Netha, Prashanth Venkat	Shruti Haasan, A. R. Ameen	4:34
5.	"Anju Vanna Poove"	Karthik Netha	Charulatha Mani	4:37
6.	"O Maara"	Paal Dabba	Paal Dabba	3:00
7.	"Engeyo"	Siva Ananth	Rakshita Suresh	2:56
8.	"Let's Play"	Thoughtsfornow	Thoughtsfornow	2:39
9.	"Anju Vanna Poove" (Reprise)	Karthik Netha	A. R. Rahman	4:14
10.	"Muththa Mazhai" (Reprise)	Siva Ananth	Chinmayi Sripada	4:01
Total length:				34:07

=== Telugu ===
No.	Title	Lyrics	Singer(s)	Length
1.	"Jinguchaa"	Anantha Sriram	Mangli, Sri Krishna, Aashima Mahajan, Vaishali Samant	4:20
2.	"Sugar Baby"	Shuba, Anantha Sriram	Alexandra Joy, Shuba, Nakul Abhyankar	3:19
3.	"Muddu Vaana"	Anantha Sriram	Chinmayi Sripada	4:00
4.	"Visvada Naayakaa"	Anantha Sriram	Alexandra Joy, Prashanth Venkat, A. R. Ameen	4:34
5.	"Achcha Vanne Poovvaa"	Anantha Sriram	Charulatha Mani	4:37
6.	"O Maara"	Rakendu Mouli	Adithya RK	3:00
7.	"Andaala Musuru"	Anantha Sriram	Rakshita Suresh	2:56
8.	"Let's Play"	Thoughtsfornow	Thoughtsfornow	2:39
9.	"Achcha Vanne Poovvaa" (Reprise)	Anantha Sriram	Vijay Yesudas	4:14
Total length:				33:39

=== Hindi ===
No.	Title	Lyrics	Singer(s)	Length
1.	"Jinguchaa"	Mehboob	Sukhwinder Singh, Ronkini Gupta, Aashima Mahajan, Vaishali Samant	4:20
2.	"Sugar Baby"	Shuba, Mehboob	Nikhita Gandhi, Shuba, Shashwat Singh	3:19
3.	"Ang Ang Morey"	Mehboob	Chinmayi Sripada	4:00
4.	"Veer E Kainaat"	Mehboob	Nikhita Gandhi, A. R. Ameen, Prashanth Venkat	4:35
5.	"Chand Ke Tukdey"	Mehboob	Sneha Shankar	4:37
6.	"O Maara"	MC HEAM	Nitesh Aher	3:00
7.	"Ek Chehra"	Mehboob	Shifa Ruby	3:00
8.	"Let's Play"	Thoughtsfornow	Thoughtsfornow	2:39
9.	"Chand Ke Tukdey" (Reprise)	Mehboob	Vijay Prakash	4:14
Total length:				33:44

== Non-album singles ==
No.	Title	Lyrics	Singer(s)	Length
1.	"King of Thugs" (Instrumental)	Choir	Nakul Abhyankar, Amina Rafiq, Deepthi Suresh, Rakshita Suresh, Alexandra Joy	2:54
2.	"New Thug In Town" (Instrumental)	Choir		0:44
3.	"The OG Thug" (Instrumental)	Karthik Netha	Alexandra Joy	0:42

== Album credits ==
=== Music and technical credits ===
- Music Composer & Producer: A. R. Rahman
- Mixing & Mastering: A. R. Rahman, Panchathan Record Inn
- Recording Engineers: Suresh Permal, Karthik Sekaran
- Music Supervision: Hitesh Chhabria
- Sound Design: Aravind Sundar
- Choreographers (Music Videos): Brinda, Sandy Master
- Music Video Direction: Mani Ratnam, Dinesh Krishnan (cinematography)

=== Instrumentalists ===
- Naveen Kumar (flute)
- Keba Jeremiah (guitar)
- V. Kumar (percussions)
- Ranjit Barot (drums, additional rhythm)

=== Recording and mixing ===
- Suresh Permal (chief sound engineer at Panchathan Record Inn)
- Karthik Sekaran (assistant engineer)

== Reception ==
=== Critical response ===
The Times of India writing for the track "Jinguchaa" called it a "foot-tapping number, which instantly struck a chord with fans and music lovers.", and termed the lyrics by Haasan as catchy. Anindita Mukherjee of News18 stated it as a "super-energetic dance number", and praised the dance performances of Sanya Malhotra, Silambarasan and Haasan. Suhas Sistu of The Hans India praised the track "O Maara" and wrote "AR Rahman’s composition in O Maara takes listeners on an adrenaline-fueled journey. Starting mellow, the track swiftly escalates into a catchy, pulsating rhythm that captures the fearless spirit of Simbu’s gangster character."

=== Audience response ===
The album received favourable feedback from the audience, with particular praise towards "Vinveli Nayaga". Shruti Haasan's singing and Netha's lyrics received praise. Shruti's performance for the song at the audio launch event was also highly praised. "Muththa Mazhai" was also performed by Chinmayi Sripada during the event, despite her ban in the industry. Her rendition received a more favourable reception by audiences compared to the original version sung by Dhee. By the audience reception, "Muththa Mazhai (Reprise)" version by Chinmayi officially released on 4 June 2025. "Sugar Baby" was however deemed inferior to the other songs in the album, with criticism towards Rahman's composition and Trisha's hook step in the music video.
