= Kasethan Kadavulada (2023 film) =

2023 Indian film by R. Kannan

- Theatrical release poster
- Directed by: R. Kannan
- Screenplay by: R. Kannan
- Based on: Kasethan Kadavulada by Chithralaya Gopu
- Produced by: R. Kannan
- Starring: Shiva; Priya Anand; Yogi Babu
- Cinematography: Prasanna Kumar
- Edited by: Nadan Surya
- Music by: RS Rajprathap
- Production companies: Masala Pix; MKRP Productions
- Distributed by: E5 Entertainment
- Release date: 27 May 2023
- Running time: 130 minutes
- Country: India
- Language: Tamil

Kasethan Kadavulada (transl. Only money is god) is a 2023 Indian Tamil-language heist comedy film written, produced and directed by R. Kannan. It is a remake of the 1972 Tamil film of the same name. The film stars Shiva, Priya Anand, and Yogi Babu, with Urvashi, Karunakaran, Sivaangi Krishnakumar, Pugazh, Thalaivasal Vijay and Manobala in supporting roles. It revolves around a man collaborating with his cousin and a friend to steal money from his stingy sister-in-law.

The film was announced in July 2021. Principal photography began the same month and ended by the following August within 35 working days. The film was released in theatres on 27 May 2023, following multiple delays since October 2022 caused by legal and financial issues to highly negative reviews.

== Plot ==
With their vain sister-in-law (Urvashi) lording over their home, two young men (Shiva and Karunakaran) who are in need of money plot to steal from her high-security vault, and recruit their conman friend (Yogi Babu) to disguise as a godman and win her trust.

== Cast ==
- Shiva as Ramu
- Priya Anand as Shakthi
- Urvashi as Sharadha
- Yogi Babu as Babu
- Thalaivasal Vijay as Saga
- VTV Ganesh as Dr. Elangeeran
- Karunakaran as Murali
- Manobala as Sundaram
- Subbu Panchu as the blackmailer
- Sivaangi Krishnakumar as Sakthi
- Siddharth Vipin as Sridhar
- P. L. Thenappan as ACP Govindaraj
- King Kong as Babu's customer
- Yogi Devaraj as a moneylender
- Pugazh as Jack

== Production ==
On 7 July 2021, R. Kannan announced he would be remaking the 1972 Tamil film Kasethan Kadavulada, directing and producing the remake under his banner Masala Pix, with MKRP Productions co-producing. As part of the announcement, Shiva would play the lead role originally done by R. Muthuraman, with Yogi Babu and Urvashi reprising the roles by originally portrayed Thengai Srinivasan and Manorama. Principal photography began on 16 July, along with the announcement that Priya Anand and Karunakaran would be reprising the roles originally played by Lakshmi and Srikanth. Sivaangi Krishnakumar was also announced in an undisclosed role. Pugazh later joined the cast in the role of a hacker, a character not present in the original film, and Thalaivasal Vijay said he would be reprising Vennira Aadai Moorthy's role. By 11 August, filming was 80% complete. Most of the film was shot on a bungalow set erected by art director Rajkumar at East Coast Road. Filming wrapped by 23 August within 35 working days.

== Soundtrack ==
The soundtrack is composed by debutant RS Rajprathap, replacing Kannan (not the director) who was originally announced as composer. It features a remix of "Jambulingame Jadaadaraa" from the original film.

Track listing
| No. | Title | Lyrics | Singer(s) | Length |
|---|---|---|---|---|
| 1. | "Indru Vandha" | Vaali | Chinmayi | 04:25 |
| 2. | "Jambulingame" | Vaali | Sathya Prakash, Diwakar, Kannan Narayanan | 04:09 |
| Total length: | | | | 08:34 |

== Release ==
Kasethan Kadavulada was initially scheduled to release in theatres on 7 October 2022, but was postponed, reportedly due to the success of Ponniyin Selvan: I resulting in non-availability of screens for other films. It was then scheduled to release on 23 December 2022, and later 10 February 2023, but then indefinitely delayed due to legal and financial issues. It was later scheduled to release in theatres on 24 March 2023, but all shows on that date were cancelled. Shortly thereafter, the film's theatrical release was again indefinitely postponed, but the following month, it was announced to release in theatres on 12 May 2023. Shortly after missing that date, it was pushed to 26 May, being released the day after. The film's post-theatrical television satellite rights were sold to Sun TV and the streaming rights to Sun NXT. It began streaming there from 23 June 2023.

== Critical reception ==
M Suganth of The Times of India gave 1 star out of 5 and wrote that "In the end, all that the film accomplishes is a grave injustice to not only to its cast and crew, and audiences". A critic from Puthiya Thalaimurai stated that it is a shame that the script team of this film did not take the same amount of effort that the audience needed to watch the film and rated 0.5 out of 5. Jayabhuvaneshwari B of Cinema Express said, "Sloppy dialogue delivery and forcefully fit one-liners make Kasethan Kadavulada a largely superficial remake that makes one think if the kaasu (transl. money) spent on the film was even worth it".
