= Sripada Kameswara Rao =

Indian translator (1877–1943)

Sripada Kameswara Rao (1877–1943) was an Indian translator. He translated Marathi, Oriya, Tamil, French, and Punjabi dramas into Telugu. He wrote numerous reviews, such as one on the play Kanyasulkam, which was published in 1933 in the Telugu literary journal Bharathi. Rao translated other scholars' writings, such as Dwijendra Lal Rai's and P. C. Vasu's contributions to dramatic and literary criticism, into Telugu prose.

Rao's son Sripada Pinakapani was a medical doctor and a Carnatic musician who received the Padma Bhushan award from the government of India. Rao's great-granddaughter, Chinmayi Sripada, is a playback singer.

== Books ==
- Kalapahad (1913)
- Bharatharamani
- Tagina sasthi
- Sahitya meemamsa
- Sri madhavacharya vidyaranyaswamy
- Pisinigottu
- Punarvivahamu
