= Kolaiseval =

- Theatrical release poster
- Directed by: V. R. Thudhivaanan
- Written by: V. R. Thudhivaanan
- Produced by: R. P. Bala; Kousalya Bala
- Starring: Kalaiyarasan; Deepa Balu; Bala Saravanan
- Cinematography: P. G. Muthiah
- Edited by: Ajay Manoj
- Music by: Santhan
- Production company: RP Films
- Release date: 13 March 2026
- Country: India
- Language: Tamil

Kolaiseval is a 2026 Indian Tamil-language psychological thriller film written and directed by V. R. Thudhivaanan and co-produced by R. P. Bala and Kousalya Bala under their banner RP Films. It stars Kalaiyarasan, Deepa Balu, and Bala Saravanan. The film was theatrically released on 13 March 2026 after a three year delay.

== Cast ==
- Kalaiyarasan as Kaali
- Deepa Balu as Anusuya
- Bala Saravanan as Kumar
- Aadhav Chandra
- Gajaraj
- Vijay Sathya
- Akaran Venkat
- Mohan Babu AVP

== Production ==
The film was announced in 2023. The film is written and directed by V. R. Thudhivaanan and produced by R. P. Bala and Kousalya Bala under RP Films. Cinematography is handled by P. G. Muthiah, while editing is done by Ajay Manoj. The music for the film is composed by Santhan.

== Release ==
The film was theatrically released on 13 March 2026.

== Reception ==
Abhinav Subramanian of The Times of India rated the film three out of five stars and wrote, "Kolaiseval bets everything on its final act, and the bet pays off. Whether the long walk there fully earns it is the only question worth arguing about". Akshay Kumar of The New Indian Express rated the film two-and-a-half out of five stars and wrote, "the makers struggle to maintain the excitement, despite a runtime of less than two hours. Thankfully, Kolaiseval doesn't dissipate quickly either".
