= Sapan Saran =

Indian writer and actress

- Born: Sapan Saran; 28 July; Bombay, India
- Occupations: Poet, writer, actress, theatre director
- Years active: 2009–2014

Sapan Saran is a poet, writer, and an actor based in Mumbai. She is the founding member of the theatre company, "Tamaasha", which aims to explore new theatre ideas in alternative spaces.

== Career ==
Her association with theatre began with a collaboration with dancer Astad Deboo. She has written the plays, Club Desire and Classics Redux, which have been directed by veteran theatre director Sunil Shanbag, with whom she also co-directed the play, Marriage-ology. Her first play- Club Desire, a Theatre Arpana and National Centre for the Performing Arts (India) production, was selected for National School of Drama's International Theatre Festival, Bharat Rang Mahotsav 2015. "The Churchgate Couple", a short 10-minute piece from Marriage-ology, written by her, garnered appreciation by critics and audiences alike. She performs plays regularly, and has modelled in several advertisements and acted in films. Her poems have been published in several magazines, including Sahitya Akademi's Samkaaleen Bhaarteeya Sahitya. Her first book of poems is due for publication.

== Filmography ==
Her film-work includes Sun TV's Kanden Kadhalai and Gautham Vasudev Menon's Telugu film Ye Maaya Chesave, with Naga Chaitanya.

Year	Film	Role	Language	Notes
2009	S.R.K		Hindi	
2009	Kanden Kadhalai	Roja	Tamil	
2010	Ye Maaya Chesave	Nandini	Telugu	
2011	Vanthaan Vendraan	Ramana's lover	Tamil	
2012	Thuppakki	Chitra	Tamil	Guest appearance
2014	Bewakoofiyaan		Hindi	
