= Raja Manthiri =

2016 Indian film by Usha Krishnan

- Poster
- Directed by: Usha Krishnan
- Produced by: V. Mathiyalagan, P. G. Muthiah
- Starring: Kalaiyarasan; Kaali Venkat; Shaalin Zoya; Vaishali; Bala Saravanan
- Cinematography: P. G. Muthiah
- Edited by: Selva R. K.
- Music by: Justin Prabhakaran
- Production companies: Etcetera Entertainment; P. G. Muthiah Productions
- Distributed by: Auraa Cinemas
- Release date: 24 June 2016
- Country: India
- Language: Tamil

Raja Manthiri (transl. King, Minister) is a 2016 Indian Tamil-language comedy drama film written and directed by Usha Krishnan and produced by V.Mathiyalagan and P. G. Muthiah Productions. The film stars Kalaiyarasan, Kaali Venkat, Shaalin Zoya and Vaishali. Featuring music composed by Justin Prabhakaran, the film was released on 24 June 2016.

== Cast ==
- Kalaiyarasan as Karthik
- Kaali Venkat as Suriya
- Shaalin Zoya as Subha
- Vaishali Radhakrishan as Maha
- Bala Saravanan as Satish
- Naadodigal Gopal as Sivakumar. Karthik and Suriya's father
- Florent Pereira as Subha's father
- Saravana Sakthi as Chithappu
- Meenakshi as Karthi and Surya's mother
- Rajapandi as Muneesh, Subha's brother
- Gajaraj as Maha's father and drunk astrologer
- Supergood Subramani as the alliance broker
- Rindhu Ravi
- Anandhi Ajay as Amba
- Gunalan

== Production ==
Usha Krishnan, an assistant of Suseenthiran, worked on the film's script in 2013 and selected Kalaiyarasan to play a leading role before he had signed on to star in his breakthrough role in Madras (2014). After being impressed by Usha's commitment as an assistant director, cinematographer Muthiah chose to make Raja Manthiri as his first production. The film was shot throughout the middle of 2015 and had entered post-production by September 2015. The film's release was put on hold for several months until the team could find an apt release date.

== Soundtrack ==
The soundtrack of the movie was composed by Justin Prabhakaran.

Raja Manthiri

Soundtrack album by Justin Prabhakaran
- Released: 2016
- Genre: Film soundtrack
- Language: Tamil
- Label: T-Series Tamil
- Producer: Justin Prabhakaran

Justin Prabhakaran chronology
Oru Naal Koothu (2016)	Raja Manthiri (2016)	Ulkuthu (2016)

- "Kootatha Kootti" — Gnana Anthony Daasan, Reetha Anthony Daasan
- "Leguva" — V. V. Prasanna, Sharanya Srinivas
- "Snegithiye" — Naresh Iyer
- "Ethutha Veetu" — ACS Ravichandran
- "Bam Bam" — Chinnaponnu

== Release ==
The film released in June 2016 to mixed reviews from critics. Sify noted the film "is an average entertainer and people, who watch village comedies, might find this as a decent watch", while Behindwood.com added it "entertains with its comical script and endearing performances by the cast". Baradwaj Rangan of the Hindu wrote "Raja Mandhiri follows the formula where practically nothing happens in the first half, and the big blow-up at interval point is where the story really gets going. But some bits work."
