= Kasethan Kadavulada =

1972 film by Chitralaya Gopu

- Theatrical release poster
- Directed by: Chithralaya Gopu
- Written by: Chithralaya Gopu
- Based on: Kasethan Kadavulada by Chithralaya Gopu
- Produced by: M. Murugan; M. Kumaran; M. Saravanan; M. Balasubramanian; M. S. Guhan
- Starring: Muthuraman; Lakshmi
- Cinematography: K. S. Bhaskar
- Edited by: R. G. Gopu
- Music by: M. S. Viswanathan
- Production company: AVM Productions
- Release date: 19 May 1972
- Running time: 142 minutes
- Country: India
- Language: Tamil

Kasethan Kadavulada (transl. Only money is God) is a 1972 Indian Tamil-language heist comedy film written and directed by Chithralaya Gopu. The film stars Muthuraman and Lakshmi, with M. R. R. Vasu, Thengai Srinivasan, Srikanth, Moorthy, Manorama, Rama Prabha and Jayakumari in supporting roles. It focuses on a young man (Muthuraman) collaborating with his cousin (Srikanth) and friend (Srinivasan) to steal money from his stingy stepmother (Manorama).

Kasethan Kadavulada, based on Gopu's play of the same name, is the directorial debut of Gopu, and was produced by AVM Productions. Muthuraman and Moorthy reprise their roles from the play. The music was composed by M. S. Viswanathan, cinematography was handled by K. S. Bhaskar, and editing by R. G. Gopu.

Kasethan Kadavulada was released on 19 May 1972. It became a commercial success, with Srinivasan's role as a fake godman becoming immensely popular. A remake with the same name was released in 2023.

== Plot ==
Lakshmi is a dominating woman who has complete control over her husband Sivaswamy's money and treats him with utter contempt. When Ramu, Sivaswamy's son from his first wife, needs ₹3,000 (equivalent to ₹150,000 or US$1,500 in 2026) for his sister's husband, the miserly Lakshmi refuses outright. Ramu and his cousin Mali hatch a plan with their tea shop friend Appaswamy, who disguises himself as a godman named Badrinath Swamy Sukranada, to access Lakshmi's locker and steal ₹50,000.

Meanwhile, Rama, an orphan, has only one friend—Iruthayam, a doctor at a mental hospital. When Rama asks for a conduct certificate to apply for a job as Lakshmi's secretary, Iruthayam makes a blunder and gives her the certificate of another girl named Rama—who is mentally unstable.

DSP Paramantham, who had earlier arrested Appaswamy, comes to meet the supposed godman. Appaswamy manages to convince him not to take up any cases for the time being. Things take a turn when Rama sees Appaswamy without his beard but, to his surprise, does not suspect anything. Soon, a telegram arrives announcing that the real Badrinath Swamy Sukranada will be arriving in two days. This puts pressure on Appaswamy to complete the theft before then.

Meanwhile, Lakshmi's brother Mani wants to buy jewellery for his girlfriend, Latha, but gets exposed by her brother. In need of money, Mani steals ₹5,001 that Lakshmi had donated to Appaswamy, but Rama catches him red-handed.

Soon, the sane Rama joins Lakshmi's household as a secretary. Despite the odd conduct certificate that claims Rama turns violent if denied what she wants, Lakshmi decides to keep her on. Rama and Ramu begin to fall in love. Coincidentally, the mentally unstable Rama and her father also land up at the same house. Matters get more tangled when her father overhears the heist plan. The unstable Rama, in a fit of anger, attacks Appaswamy. A secret understanding is struck: Ramu and Appaswamy will not reveal that the sane Rama is actually insane, and in return, the father will not expose the heist plan.

Lakshmi, trusting the godman, shows Appaswamy her hidden stash and how to access it. That night, Appaswamy and Ramu carry out the heist and hide the money in a flower pot. But things unravel when the insane Rama's father, the sane Rama, and Mani all stumble upon the stash. Mani throws the cash to Latha's brother, but once again Rama catches him red-handed. The money ends up inside Latha's brother's coat.

To prove the other Rama is insane, the sane Rama cleverly tells her the coat would look nice on her. When Latha's brother refuses to part with it, the unstable Rama creates a scene, exposing her condition. With all confusions cleared up, Lakshmi calms down and agrees to Ramu and the sane Rama's marriage.

== Cast ==
Actors

- Muthuraman as Ramu
- M. R. R. Vasu as the insane Rama's father
- Thengai Srinivasan as Appaswamy
- Srikanth as Mali
- Moorthy as Sivaswamy
- Typist Gopu as Dr. Iruthayam
- Sasikumar as Mani
- Senthamarai as DSP Paramantham (guest appearance)
- Suruli Rajan as Chettiar (guest appearance)
- S. Rama Rao as Iyer
- S. L. Narayanan as Dr. Iruthayam's secretary
- Sundhar as Mugilan

Actresses

- Lakshmi as the secretary Rama
- Manorama as Lakshmi
- Rama Prabha as the insane Rama
- Jayakumari as Latha
- Kumari Sachu as a popular dancer (guest appearance)
- Vijayarekha as Appaswamy's wife
- Renuka Sheshathri as Prema

== Production ==
Kasethan Kadavulada was a play written and directed by Chithralaya Gopu, and staged over 300 times. AVM Productions founder A. V. Meiyappan who saw the play decided to adapt it into a feature film and insisted Gopu direct; Gopu initially refused the directorial offer and wanted C. V. Rajendran to direct the film. The film adaptation marked Gopu's directorial debut. While Muthuraman and Moorthy reprised their roles from the play as son and father, Manorama, who portrayed the lead actor's love interest in the play, portrayed the matriarch in the film; the lead actor's love interest in the film was instead portrayed by Lakshmi. Thengai Srinivasan portrayed the tea vendor Appaswamy masquerading as a godman, reprising the role originally played by Ramani, a mimicry artist, though many thought Nagesh would be cast in that role. In portraying Appaswamy, Srinivasan spoke in Madras Bashai. Cinematography was handled by K. S. Bhaskar, and editing by R. G. Gopu.

== Soundtrack ==
The music was composed by M. S. Viswanathan, with lyrics by Vaali. The song "Jambulingame" became popular upon release. Elements of the song were borrowed by Thaman S and used in "Pudhu Punal" from Mouna Guru (2011). That song and "Indru Vandha" were reused in the film's 2023 remake.

Track listing
| No. | Title | Singer(s) | Length |
|---|---|---|---|
| 1. | "Mella Pesungal" | Kovai Soundararajan, L. R. Eswari | 4:18 |
| 2. | "Jambulingame Jadaadaraa" | K. Veeramani, Kovai Soundararajan, Dharapuram Sundarrajan | 3:33 |
| 3. | "Andavan Thodangi" | M. S. Viswanathan, A. L. Raghavan, K. Veeramani | 3:29 |
| 4. | "Aval Enna Ninaithal" | P. Susheela | 3:24 |
| 5. | "Indru Vantha Intha Mayakkam" | P. Susheela | 3:35 |
| Total length: | | | 18:19 |

== Release and reception ==
Kasethan Kadavulada was released on 19 May 1972. Gopu recalled that producers put up a huge cut-out for Srinivasan in the saint get-up. Srinivasan who was pleased did not want the lead actor Muthuraman to misunderstand so he and Gopu went to Muthuraman and explained that it was the role that became popular and even apologised to Muthuraman who smiled it away. This cut-out created controversy when a journalist wrote that Srinivasan's look from the film resembled religious singer Pithukuli Murugadas, which led Murugadas to call Gopu and express his dissatisfaction, but Gopu asked him to watch the film to learn the truth; he did so and was impressed with it. The film was a commercial success, and Gopu received more film offers to work as both director and writer. Historian Randor Guy attributed the success to "the excellent comedy sequences, humorous dialogue, fine direction of Chitralaya Gopu and excellent performances".

== Other versions ==
In 2017, Y. G. Mahendran organised a play based on the film that was staged in Mylapore. Mahendran reprised the role of Srinivasan from the film. The play was performed 100 times. The film was remade in Tamil under the same title by R. Kannan, and released on 27 May 2023.

== Home media ==
Kasethan Kadavulada was made available for viewing on Amazon Prime Video when it was launched in India in December 2016.
