= Muththa Mazhai =

2025 song by A. R. Rahman

- Official cover

Song by A. R. Rahman (composer) Dhee and Chinmayi Sripada (performer)

from the album Thug Life
- Language: Tamil
- Released: 24 May 2025
- Recorded: 2024
- Genre: Feature film soundtrack, classical, melody
- Length: 4:01
- Label: Saregama
- Composer: A. R. Rahman
- Lyricist: Siva Ananth

Music video
- "Muththa Mazhai" on YouTube

"Muththa Mazhai" (transl. Rain of kisses) is an Indian Tamil-language song composed by A. R. Rahman and sung by Dhee and later a reprise version was created with Chinmayi Sripada for the soundtrack album of the 2025 film Thug Life. The film, directed by Mani Ratnam, starring Kamal Haasan, Silambarasan, Trisha Krishnan, Aishwarya Lekshmi and Abhirami. The song was released as a part of the film's soundtrack album on 24 May 2025.

== Music video ==
The song is set in a performing arts theatre. Indhrani (Trisha Krishnan) is singing the song in front of audiences along with dancers on the stage. The Muththa Mazhai song starts when Indhrani is performing the song in front of audiences. Throughout the song, the lyrics express how Indrani suffers the absence of Rangaraaya Sakthivel (Kamal Haasan) in her life.

== Chinmayi reprise ==
"Muththa Mazhai" was also performed by Chinmayi Sripada during the audio launch event, despite her ban in the industry. Her rendition received a more favourable reception by audiences compared to the original version sung by Dhee. By the audience reception, "Muththa Mazhai (Reprise)" version by Chinmayi was included to the soundtrack of the film and officially released on 4 June 2025 on music platforms such as Spotify, Apple Music and YouTube.

== Reception ==
=== Critical response ===
Times of India commented "'Muththa Mazhai,' composed by A. R. Rahman, is one of the standout tracks from Thug Life, a film that marks Kamal Haasan and Mani Ratnam's reunion after 35 years. The decision to have Dhee sing the Tamil version appears to be a creative one, likely to give the track a fresh, distinct tone that matches the film's contemporary style. Meanwhile, Chinmayi's version showcased classic playback finesse, making both versions artistically valuable in their own right".

== See also ==
- Thug Life (soundtrack)
