= Chinmayi Sripada =

Indian playback singer (born 1984)

Chinmayi
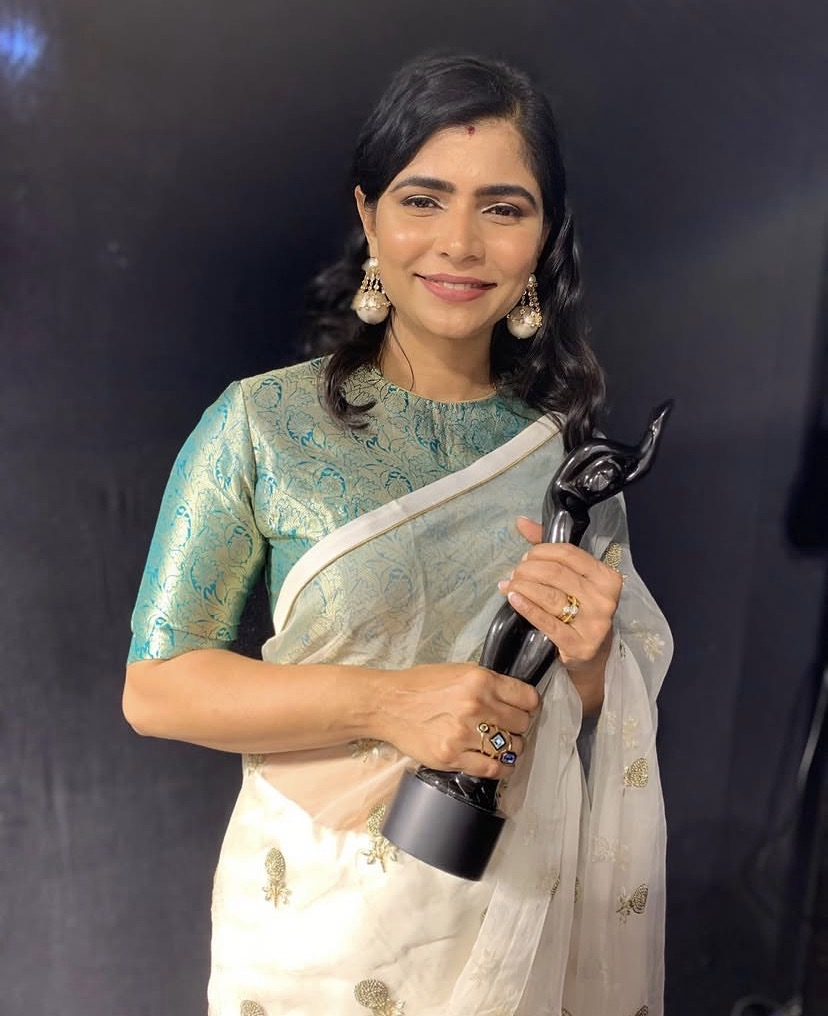
- Chinmayi in 2018
- Born: Chinmayi Sripada; 10 September 1984 (age 42); Bombay, Maharashtra, India
- Other name: Indai Haza
- Education: University of Madras
- Occupations: Singer; Voice Actor; Entrepreneur; Radio Jockey
- Years active: 2002–present
- Spouse: Rahul Ravindran (m. 2014)
- Children: 2
- Relatives: Sripada Kameswara Rao (Great-grandfather); Sripada Pinakapani (Grandfather)
- Musical career
- Genres: Indian classical music; Playback singing; Filmi; Carnatic; Ghazal
- Instruments: Vocals, Piano
- Labels: Times Music; WorldWide Records; Nadham Music Media; Sruthilaya Audio Recording Co

Chinmayi Sripada (born 10 September 1984), known mononymously as Chinmayi, is an Indian singer, voice actress, entrepreneur and a former radio and video jockey. She predominantly works in Tamil, Telugu, Kannada, Malayalam, Marathi and Hindi films. She rose to fame for her critically acclaimed song "Oru Deivam Thantha Poovae", composed by A. R. Rahman from the film Kannathil Muthamittal (2002), directed by Mani Ratnam. She debuted as a voice artist in Sillunu Oru Kaadhal (2006) featuring Suriya and Jyothika and she rendered voice for the supporting role done by Bhumika Chawla, after being referred by one of A. R. Rahman's sound engineers.

She debuted as a composed with a short lullaby titled Laali, which she also sang and released as part of Instagram's #1MinMusic.

She is the founder and CEO of a translation services company Blue Elephant, a skincare company importing K-beauty to India, Skinroute (formerly Isle Of Skin), and a medi-spa Deep Skin Dialogues in Chennai and Hyderabad.

She is often credited as Chinmayee and was credited as Indai Haza which means "Angel of Music" (by composer A. R. Rahman for one of his songs - I Miss You da). She is also a social activist often raising her voice against issues faced by women and has been one of the faces of the second wave of #MeToo movement in India.

== Early life ==
Chinmayi was born in Bombay, Maharashtra. She was raised by her mother Padmhasini Thirumalai from the age of 1. She underwent formal training in Carnatic classical music from her mother from a very young age (3–4). She later decided to switch over to Hindustani classical music. She received the CCRT Scholarship for Young Talent for Carnatic Music from the Government of India at the age of 10. She won the gold medal from All India Radio for Ghazals in 2000 and the silver medal for Hindustani Classical Music in 2002 earning the B Grade for both, from All India Radio She learned German as a language in the Max Mueller Bhavan, French from Alliance Francaise in Chennai and completed certification courses from NIIT and SSI in web design. She homeschooled post her 10th grade, and she held jobs with both Sify and studentconcepts.org.

Chinmayi has a Bachelor of Science degree in psychology from the University of Madras and is currently pursuing a degree in Traditional Chinese Medicine from Canada. She has learned Odissi in the Guru Kelucharan Mohapatra style for over 10 years under the tutelage of Kshama Rau and learned Kathak, Sarangi and Tabla briefly. Chinmayi is a polyglot; apart from Tamil and Telugu she also speaks, English, Hindi, German and French fluently, and has a working knowledge of Spanish, Malayalam, Kannada, Marathi and Punjabi.

== Career ==
=== Singing ===
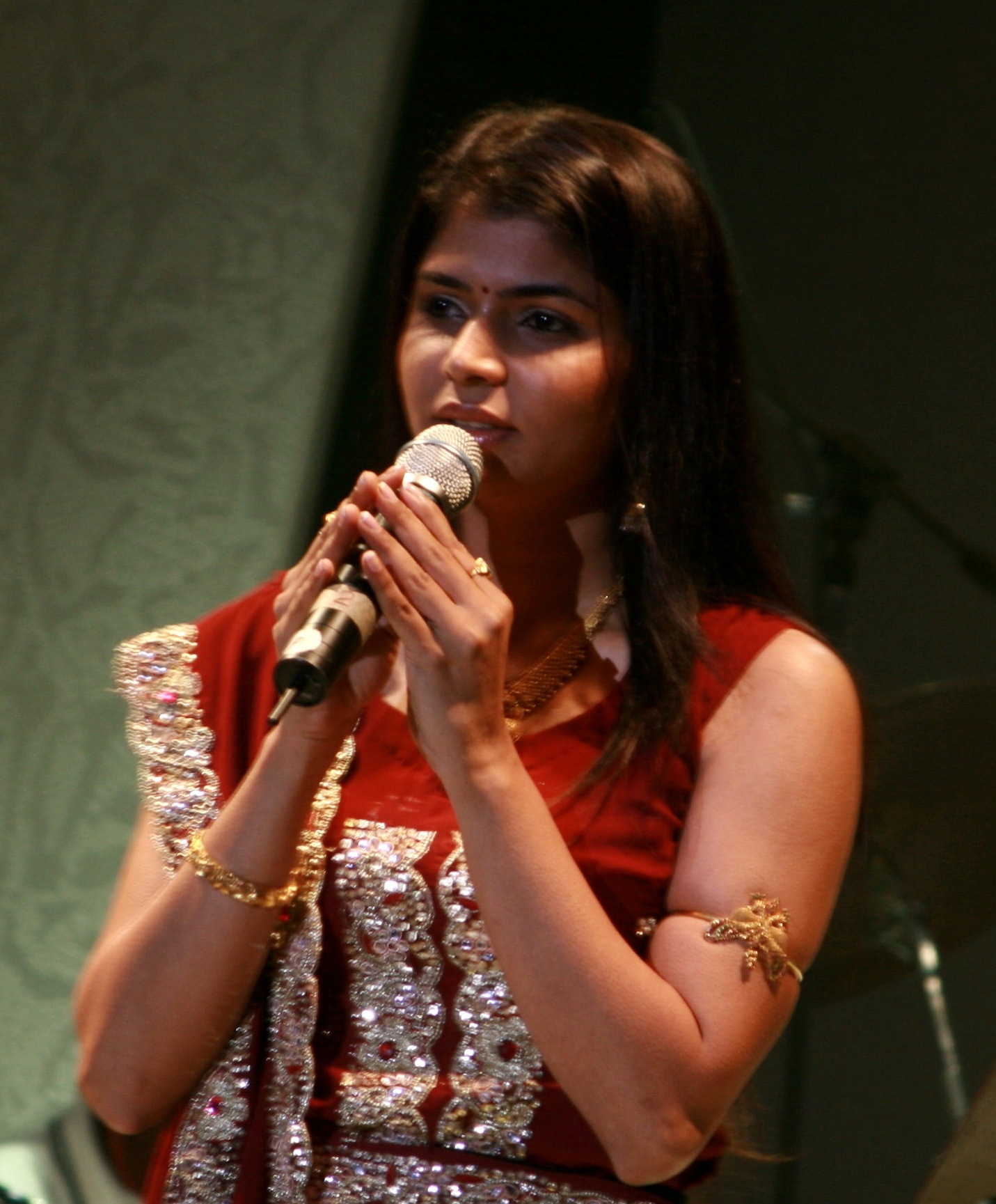
Chinmayi performing at a concert

She participated and won the singing show of Sun TV, Saptasawarangal, following which she was introduced by singer Srinivas to film composer A. R. Rahman. Chinmayi's playback singing career began with her performance of Rahman's "Oru Dheivam Thanta Poove" for the film Kannathil Muthamittal. After a couple of years of singing exclusively for Tamil, Telugu, Tulu and Malayalam films, she made her Bollywood debut in Mangal Pandey: The Rising with the song "Holi Re". About a year later, she garnered more recognition with her performances of "Tere Bina" and "Mayya" in the movie Guru. In 2007, the song "Beda Beda" marked her first venture into Kannada playback singing. She has since received critical acclaim for songs such as "Sahana Saaral", "Vaarayo Vaarayo", "Kilimanjaro", "Sara Sara", "Asku Laska", "Kaathale Kaathale" and Muththa Mazhai. She received her second break in Bollywood with three consecutive songs "Titli" from Chennai Express, "Zehnaseeb" from Hasee Toh Phasee, and "Main Rang Sharbaton Ka" from Phata Poster Nikla Hero. She then received critical acclaim for the song "Mast Magan" from 2 states, which she had sung along with Arijit Singh. She has also sung in Marathi language in movies such as "Sairat". Chinmayi as of 2020 had to her credit over 2,000 songs in 10 different languages. In 2025, Chinmayi had one of the biggest breakthroughs of her career, and also a re-entry to the Tamil industry with her performance of the song "Muththa Mazhai" from the Thug Life audio launch which went viral. Her live performance video uploaded on YouTube by Saregama Audio Label reached over 100M+ views, garnering widespread critical acclaim and an urge to include it in the official soundtrack by the audiences. Following this, "Muththa Mazhai (Reprise)" was officially released on music streaming platforms and included in the film's official soundtrack a day prior to its release. Additionally, as of the end of 2025, her song "Tere Bina" with A. R. Rahman continues to be in the top 10 streamed songs across India on Spotify.

==== Additional works ====
Chinmayi announced that she will release a single in Tamil, Malayalam and Telugu in iTunes on occasion of Joy of Giving Week on 2 Oct, and proceeds of which shall go to 17000 ft.org so as to promote philanthropy, charity and the concept of giving.

She also collaborated with Shekar Ravjiani to launch a single in Tamil/Telugu the name of the album being Sitakokachiluka (Butterfly), again for which the legal downloads of it will go to Ma Niketan, a home that takes care of abandoned or uncared-for girl children in Thane, a charity that composer Shekhar has been supporting.

During the COVID-19 Pandemic, she started an initiative called "Sing for Charity" through which her fans and audiences could support families in need (those who lost jobs due to the pandemic lockdown) by transferring some amount of money directly to the family, and in return, she would send them personalised singing videos/wishes for special occasions, for their friend/family member. Chinmayi, since April 2020 till the world returned to normalcy, has been able to raise money and essentials worth ₹1 crore to the needy through this initiative, by recording and sharing over 3,000 songs. She recollected one particular day when she recorded and sent over 85 such song requests.

=== Voice acting ===
Chinmayi turned a voice actor for the Tamil film Sillunu Oru Kadhal (2006), speaking dubbing for actress Bhumika Chawla, an opportunity that came through A. R. Rahman's office. Since then, she has dubbed for several lead actresses in Tamil films, including Tamannaah Bhatia, Sameera Reddy, Samantha Ruth Prabhu and Trisha Krishnan. She has also provided her voice in dubbed Telugu films. She dubbed for the critically acclaimed fictional character Jessie who was portrayed by Trisha in Vinnaithaandi Varuvaaya. The same character appeared in the film's Telugu version Ye Maaya Chesave and was portrayed by Samantha, while being portrayed by Amy Jackson in the Hindi version Ek Deewana Tha. Chinmayi dubbed for the character in all three films and won the Nandi Award for Best Female Dubbing Artist for Ye Maaya Chesave in 2010. Chinmayi dubbed in Vettai for Sameera Reddy and has dubbed for her in all Tamil movies. She dubbed for Samantha Ruth Prabhu in Eega in Telugu and its Tamil version Naan Ee in 2012. She dubbed voice for Nayanthara in the Tamil version of the movie Sri Rama Rajyam, and in the Telugu version of Naanum Rowdy Dhaan. Chinmayi has also been the voice of Lavanya Tripathi in many of her movies, starting from Andala Rakshasi, then Bhale Bhale Magadivoy, Maayavan, Chaavu Kaburu Challaga, and A1 Express. Chinmayi has dubbed for Samantha Ruth Prabhu in many films like Rabhasa, Atharintiki Daaredi, Ramayya Vasthavayya, Seethamma Vakitlo Sirimalle Chettu, 24, Oh! Baby and many more in Telugu. In the 2018 film '96 (film), she dubbed for the female lead Trisha and also sang all the songs in the film, and subsequently worked in the Telugu remake Jaanu, in which she dubbed for Samantha Prabhu and sang all the songs in the film. She made a comeback to dubbing in Tamil films in 2023 (after facing a 5-year ban from the Tamil film industry) with Lokesh Kanagaraj and Vijay's Leo in which she dubbed for Trisha's character, Sathya, in 3 languages - Tamil, Telugu, and Kannada. Leo also marks Chinmayi's dubbing debut in the Kannada film industry. Chinmayi dubbed for Mrunal Thakur in her Telugu debut Sita Ramam, which became a huge success, and she received appreciation for dubbing for the character of Sita Mahalakshmi/Princess Noorjahan. She subsequently dubbed for Mrunal in her next Telugu film, Hi Nanna. And in 2026 for her again in Dacoit: A Love Story.

=== Television, radio, and hosting ===
Chinmayi served as a television presenter during the first season of Airtel Super Singer on STAR Vijay that was aired between April and August 2006 and the first season of Airtel Super Singer Junior from February 2007 to July 2007. In 2008, she returned as host of the second season of Airtel Super Singer, though she discontinued her role before the completion of the season, as she stated the show extended the period of the initial contract. During this time, she was also a radio jockey on Aahaa FM 91.9 in Chennai, on a breakfast show titled Aahaa Kaapi Klub. She later began compering Star Plus's Chhote Ustaad, which ran concurrently with another music talent show she started hosting in June, the debut season of Sun TV's Sangeetha Mahayuddham. On 15 August 2010, Chinmayi announced that that day's Chhote Ustaad would be her last as host, leaving the show after only eight episodes. She appeared as a judge on Sun Singer which aired on Sun TV between 2016 and 2017. She was also on the judges' panel of Jaya Star Singers in Jaya TV, but the show was halted due to the COVID-19 Pandemic, and did not resume further.

Chinmayi has also been the host for numerous audio launch functions in the Tamil film industry, with one such event being the audio launch of Shankar's I where she welcomed stalwarts like Arnold Schwarzenegger and Rajinikanth. She hosted one of the largest events in Indian Cinema in 2013 along with Sivakarthikeyan, 100 years of Indian Cinema Celebrations, organized by the South Indian Film Chamber of Commerce and inaugurated by the then Chief Minister of Tamil Nadu J. Jayalalithaa. She also hosted the event organized to facilitate music composer M. S. Viswanathan with the Thirai Isai Chakravarthy award by Jayalalithaa, titled "Ninaithale Inikkum".

== Personal life ==
Chinmayi is married to Rahul Ravindran. In September 2013, through Twitter, Chinmayi's mother Padmhasini revealed Chinmayi was engaged to Rahul Ravindran, who is a National Award winning Screenplaywright (Chi La Sow) Indian actor and Director (Chi La Sow, Manmadhudu 2, The Girlfriend). Chinmayi and Rahul met at the screening of the film Andhaala Rakshasi. They got married on 5 May 2014. She gave birth to twin children, Driptah and Sharvas on 20 June 2022.

== Other work ==
=== Activism ===
Chinmayi is a prominent figure in India's #MeToo movement, using her social media presence to publicise allegations of sexual harassment within the country's entertainment industry. In 2018, she accused lyricist Vairamuthu of sexual harassment, alleging two separate incidents that took place in Sweden and at his office in Kodambakkam, Chennai in 2006. She also amplified the claims of others against musicians such as Anu Malik, O. S. Thyagarajan, Raghu Dixit, and Karthik. Her allegations were met with cyberbullying and accusations from some political activists that they were motivated by caste prejudice. Chinmayi also publicised an allegation against N. Narayanan, the president of the Tamil Nadu Brahmins Association (TAMBRAS).

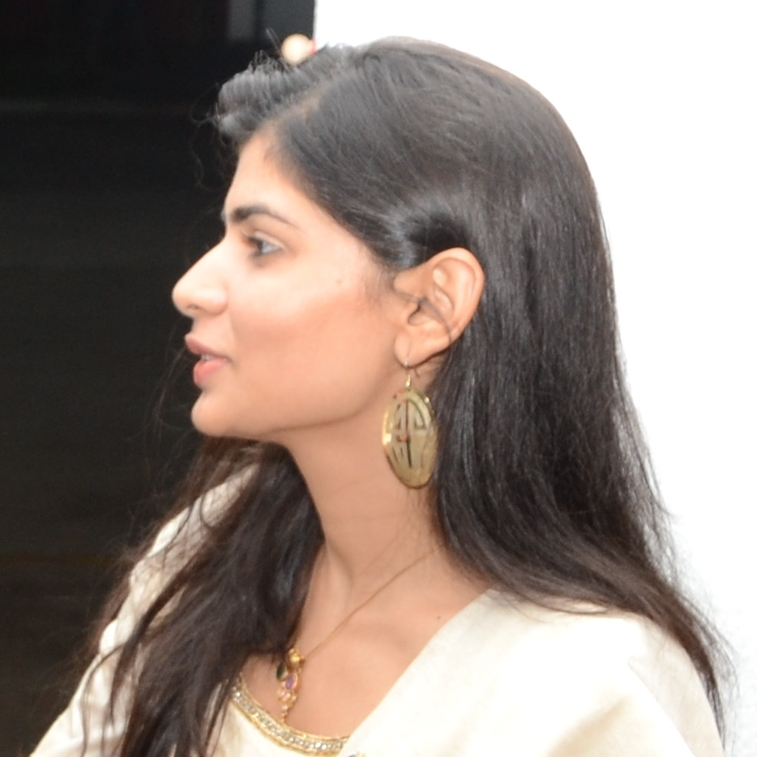
Chinmayi in 2011

Following her accusations, Chinmayi's membership in the Tamil Film Dubbing Union was terminated by its president, Radha Ravi, citing non-payment of fees. Chinmayi stated that her singing and dubbing opportunities in the Tamil film industry declined significantly after her involvement in the movement and that she was effectively banned from working. The matter was taken to court and is sub judice.

A scene in the 2026 Tamil film Karuppu directed by RJ Balaji was inspired by Chinmayi's account of sexual harassment against Vairamuthu, incidentally having Chinmayi herself dub in this scene for the character of Preethi, an advocate, played by Trisha. The scene depicts a woman named "Kanmani" raising allegations of sexual harassment against an influential politician named "V. M. Pandian", reporting the incident many years after it occurred, and eventually getting justice despite initially being shamed for reporting it late.

Chinmayi was selected for the Fortune/US State Department Global Women's Mentoring Partnership in 2011, one of three Indian women chosen that year.

=== Entrepreneurship ===
Chinmayi is the CEO of "Blue Elephant", a translation services company she founded in August 2005. The company has since been the language service provider for various Multinational companies like Scope E Knowledge, Ford, Dell, Ashok Leyland, and Reliance India. She received an award from SAARC Chamber for Women Entrepreneurship for Excellence in a niche industry for Blue Elephant in 2010. In 2011, she became the first woman entrepreneur from Tamil Nadu to be selected for the FORTUNE/US State Department Global Women's Mentoring Partnership Program. She started an architectural and interior design firm "Heka Studios" along with two architects on 27 August 2015. She travelled to South Korea in 2018 to explore the K-Beauty market there, post which she founded her skincare brand "Isle of Skin" which legally imports Korean and Taiwanese skincare products to India. She then opened a medi-spa "Deep Skin Dialogues" in November 2021, which was inaugurated by actor Samantha Ruth Prabhu at Chetpet, Chennai. Another branch of DSD was opened in Hyderabad in May 2022. Isle of Skin was rebranded as "SkinRoute" in 2024. Deep Skin Dialogues was rebranded as "iGen Clinics" and expanded to provide world class Aesthetic Treatments, Pain and Regenerative medicine, Cardiology, Pulmonogy, Gynaecology and Neuro consult services in Chennai and Hyderabad. It was inaugurated by music maestro A. R. Rahman on 10 August 2026.

== Discography ==
Chinmayi has produced songs since 2002 and done work in Tamil, Telugu, Hindi, Malayalam, Kannada and other regional variants. She has also produced various jingles for advertisements and television.

== Filmography ==
=== As voice actor ===
Year	Film	Dubbing for	Language	Notes
2006	Sillunu Oru Kadhal	Bhumika Chawla	Tamil	
2007	Unnale Unnale	Tanisha	Tamil	
2007	Satham Podathey	Padmapriya	Tamil	
2008	Jayam Kondaan	Lekha Washington	Tamil	
2008	Dhaam Dhoom	Kangana Ranaut	Tamil	
2008	Sakkarakatti	Vedhika	Tamil	
2008	Vaaranam Aayiram	Sameera Reddy	Tamil	Also dubbed in Telugu dubbed version titled Surya S/O Krishnan. Telugu dubbing debut.
2009	TN-07 AL 4777	Meenakshi	Tamil	
2009	Yavarum Nalam	Neetu Chandra	Tamil	
2009	Modhi Vilayaadu	Kajal Aggarwal	Tamil	
2009	Kandein Kadhalai	Tamannaah Bhatia	Tamil	Also dubbed in Telugu dubbed version titled Priya Priyatama released in 2011.
2010	Aasal	Sameera Reddy	Tamil	
2010	Rakta Charitra	Radhika Apte	Telugu	
2010	Theeradha Vilaiyattu Pillai	Neetu Chandra	Tamil	Also dubbed in Telugu dubbed version titled Khilladi.
2010	Vinnaithaandi Varuvaayaa	Trisha Krishnan	Tamil	
2010	Vinnaithaandi Varuvaayaa	Samantha	Tamil	For the cameo role of Samantha
2010	Ye Maaya Chesave	Samantha	Telugu	
2010	Sura	Tamannaah Bhatia	Tamil	
2010	Manmadha Baanam (Manmadhan Ambu)	Trisha Krishnan	Telugu	Dubbed version
2011	Ko	Karthika Nair	Tamil	
2011	Nadunissi Naaygal	Sameera Reddy	Tamil	Also dubbed in Telugu dubbed version titled Erra Gulabilu
2011	Vanthaan Vendraan	Taapsee Pannu	Tamil	
2011	Sri Rama Rajyam	Nayanthara	Tamil (Dubbed version)	
2011	Dhada	Kajal Aggarwal	Telugu	
2011	Dookudu	Samantha Ruth Prabhu	Telugu	
2011	Vedi	Sameera Reddy	Tamil	
2011	Osthe	Richa Gangopadhyay	Tamil	
2012	Vettai	Sameera Reddy	Tamil	
2012	Ekk Deewana Tha	Amy Jackson	Hindi	Hindi dubbing debut
2012	Muppozhudhum Un Karpanaigal	Amala Paul	Tamil	
2012	Eega	Samantha	Telugu	
2012	Naan Ee	Samantha	Tamil	
2012	Maattrraan	Kajal Aggarwal	Tamil	Also dubbed in Telugu dubbed version titled Brothers and Hindi dubbed version titled No. 1 Judwaa - The Unbreakable released in 2014.
2012	Andala Rakshasi	Lavanya Tripathi	Telugu	
2012	Yeto Vellipoyindhi Manasu	Samantha	Telugu	
2013	Seethamma Vakitlo Sirimalle Chettu	Samantha	Telugu	
2013	Atharintiki Daaredi	Samantha	Telugu	
2013	Ramayya Vasthavayya	Samantha	Telugu	
2013	Thoofan	Priyanka Chopra	Telugu	
2013	Marandhen Manithen	Lakshmi Manchu	Tamil	Dubbed version
2013	Irandam Ulagam	Anushka Shetty	Tamil	
2013	Ala Ela	Hebah Patel	Telugu	
2013	Endrendrum Punnagai	Trisha Krishnan	Tamil	
2014	Aaha Kalyanam	Vaani Kapoor	Tamil	Also dubbed in Telugu dubbed version.
2014	Alludu Seenu	Samantha	Telugu	
2014	Manam	Samantha	Telugu	
2014	Oka Laila Kosam	Pooja Hegde	Telugu	
2014	Lingaa	Sonakshi Sinha	Tamil	Also dubbed in Telugu dubbed version
2015	I	Amy Jackson	Hindi	Dubbed version
2015	Vaa Deal	Karthika Nair	Tamil	Unreleased film
2015	Bhale Bhale Magadivoy	Lavanya Tripathi	Telugu	
2015	Dohchay	Kriti Sanon	Telugu	
2015	S/O Satyamurthy	Samantha	Telugu	
2016	Police	Samantha	Telugu	Dubbed version
2016	Nenu Rowdy Ne	Nayanthara	Telugu	
2016	Sarrainodu	Rakul Preet Singh	Telugu	
2016	Brahmotsavam	Samantha	Telugu	
2016	A Aa	Samantha	Telugu	
2016	24	Samantha	Tamil	Also dubbed in Telugu dubbed version
2016	Janatha Garage	Samantha	Telugu	
2016	Majnu	Anu Emmanuel	Telugu	
2016	Jaguar	Deepti Sati	Telugu	
2016	Premam	Shruthi Haasan	Telugu	
2016	Sahasam Swasaga Sagipo	Manjima Mohan	Telugu	
2016	Raju Gari Gadhi 2	Samantha Ruth Prabhu	Telugu	
2017	Ivan Thanthiran	Shraddha Srinath	Tamil	
2017	The House Next Door	Andrea Jeremiah	Hindi	
2017	Gruham	Andrea Jeremiah	Telugu	
2017	Maayavan	Lavanya Tripathi	Tamil	Also dubbed in Telugu dubbed version titled Project Z.
2018	Irumbu Thirai	Samantha Ruth Prabhu	Tamil	
2018	Shailaja Reddy Alludu	Anu Emmanuel	Telugu	
2018	Chi La Sow	Ruhani Sharma	Telugu	
2018	96	Trisha Krishnan	Tamil	
2019	Seema Raja	Samantha	Telugu	
2019	Majili	Samantha	Telugu	
2019	Oh Baby	Samantha	Telugu	Also dubbed in Tamil dubbed version.
2019	Manmadhudu 2	Rakul Preet Singh	Telugu	
2019	Manmadhudu 2	Samantha	Telugu	
2019	Hero	Kalyani Priyadarshan	Tamil	
2019	Ninu Veedani Needanu Nene	Anya Singh	Telugu	
2020	Jaanu	Samantha	Telugu	
2021	Chaavu Kaburu Challaga	Lavanya Tripathi	Telugu	
2021	A1 Express	Lavanya Tripathi	Telugu	
2021	Paagal	Nivetha Pethuraj	Telugu	
2021	Romantic	Ketika Sharma	Telugu	
2021	Thalli Pogathey	Anupama Parameswaran	Tamil	
2021	Galatta Kalyanam (Atrangi Re)	Sara Ali Khan	Tamil	Dubbed version
2022	Malli Modalaindi	Naina Ganguly	Telugu	
2022	Kanmani Rambo Khatija (Kaathuvaakula Rendu Kaadhal)	Samantha	Telugu	Dubbed version
2022	Ramarao on Duty	Rajisha Vijayan	Telugu	
2022	Sita Ramam	Mrunal Thakur	Telugu	
2022	Ori Devuda	Asha Bhat	Telugu	
2022	Kaiyum Kalavum	Akka/Partner (Narrator)	Tamil	Sony Liv Web Series - Voice Only. Along with Bobby Simha
2022	Yashoda	Samantha	Hindi	Dubbed version
2023	Kushi	Samantha	Telugu	Also dubbed in Tamil dubbed version.
2023	Leo	Trisha Krishnan	Tamil	Also dubbed in Telugu and Kannada dubbed versions. Kannada dubbing debut. Won the Best Dubbing Artist at the JFW Movie Awards 2024.
2023	Hi Nanna	Mrunal Thakur	Telugu	Also dubbed in Tamil dubbed version.
2026	Dacoit: A Love Story	Mrunal Thakur	Telugu	
2026	Karuppu	Trisha Krishnan	Tamil	
2026	Idhayam Murali	Kayadu Lohar	Tamil	Also dubbed in Telugu dubbed version.

=== Other roles ===
Year	Title	Role	Language	Notes
2011	Rowthiram		Tamil	Special appearance
2019	Famously Filmfare	Host	Telugu	MX Player talk show
2021	Most Eligible Bachelor	Herself	Telugu	Cameo appearance along with her husband Rahul Ravindran

== Awards and nominations ==
Tamil Nadu State Film Awards

- 2002: Best Female Playback – "Oru Deivam Thantha Poove" (Kannathil Muthamittal)
- 2007: Best Female Playback – "Sahana" (Sivaji)
- 2010: Best Female Playback – "Kilimanjaro" (Enthiran)

Nandi Awards

- 2015-Best Female Playback Singer-"Yenno Yenno Varnala" (Malli Malli Idi Rani Roju)
- 2016-Best Female Playback Singer-"Manasantha Megamai" (Kalyana Vaibhogame)
- 2010-Best Female Dubbing Artist- Ye Maaya Chesave (Samantha Ruth Prabhu)
- 2014-Best Female Dubbing Artist- Manam (Samantha Ruth Prabhu)

Goa State Cultural Awards

- 2025 : Best female Playback Singer —“Morachi Paankha” (Amizade)

Filmfare Awards

- 2014: Nominated, Best Female Playback Singer – "Titli" (Chennai Express)

Filmfare Awards South

- 2009: Best Female Playback Singer – Tamil – "Vaarayo Vaarayo" (Aadhavan)
- 2011: Best Female Playback Singer – Tamil – "Sara Sara Saara Kaathu" (Vaagai Sooda Vaa)
- 2016: Best Female Playback Singer – Malayalam – "Oonjalilaadi Vanna" (Action Hero Biju)
- 2018: Best Female Playback Singer – Tamil – "Kaathale Kaathale" ('96)
- 2022: Best Female Playback Singer – Telugu – "Oh Prema" (Sita Ramam)
  - 2007: Nominated, Best Female Playback Singer – Tamil – "Sahana" (Sivaji: The Boss)
  - 2010: Nominated, Best Female Playback Singer – Tamil – "Kilimanjaro" (Enthiran)
  - 2013: Nominated, Best Female Playback Singer – Tamil – "Asku Laska" (Nanban)
  - 2015: Nominated, Best Female Playback Singer – Telugu – "Ra Rakumara" (Govindudu Andarivadele)
  - 2016: Nominated, Best Female Playback Singer – Tamil – "Naan Un" (24)
  - 2017: Nominated, Best Female Playback Singer – Telugu – "Oye Meghamala" (Majnu)
  - 2018: Nominated, Best Female Playback Singer – Telugu – "Yenti Yenti" (Geetha Govindam)
  - 2020: Nominated, Best Female Playback Singer – Kannada – "Soul of Dia" (Dia)
  - 2021: Nominated, Best Female Playback Singer – Telugu – "Manasulone Nilichipoke" (Varudu Kaavalenu)
  - 2022: Nominated, Best Female Playback Singer – Tamil – "Panithuli" (Raangi)
  - 2023: Nominated, Best Female Playback Singer – Telugu – "Aradhya" (Kushi)
  - 2023: Nominated, Best Female Playback Singer – Telugu – "Odiyamma" (Hi Nanna)

Filmfare Awards Marathi

- 2016: Best Female Playback Singer - Sairat Zaala Ji (Sairat)

South Indian International Movie Awards

- 2011 – SIIMA Award for Best Female Playback Singer (Tamil) – "Sara Sara" (Vaagai Sooda Vaa)
- 2019 - SIIMA Award for Best Female Playback Singer – Telugu - "Priyathama Priyathama" (Majili)
  - 2013 : Nominated, SIIMA Award for Best Female Playback Singer (Tamil) - "Mella Sirithai" (Kalyana Samayal Saadham)
  - 2014 : Nominated, SIIMA Award for Best Female Playback Singer (Telugu) - "Vaddantune" (Run Raja Run)
  - 2015 : Nominated, SIIMA Award for Best Female Playback Singer (Tamil) - "Idhaythai Yedho Ondru" (Yennai Arindhaal)
  - 2015 : Nominated, SIIMA Award for Best Female Playback Singer (Telugu) - "Vennellona Mounam" (Surya vs Surya)
  - 2018 : Nominated, SIIMA Award for Best Female Playback Singer (Tamil) - "Kadhale Kadhale" ('96)
  - 2018 : Nominated, SIIMA Award for Best Female Playback Singer (Telugu) - "Yenti Yenti" (Geetha Govindam)
  - 2020 : Nominated, SIIMA Award for Best Female Playback Singer (Telugu) - "Oohale" (Jaanu)
  - 2020 : Nominated, SIIMA Award for Best Female Playback Singer (Kannada) - "Soul of Dia" (Dia)

Mirchi Music Awards

- 2013: Female Vocalist of the Year – "Titli" (Chennai Express)
- 2014: Mirchi Platinum Disc - Mast Magan
- 2014: Mirchi Music Awards - Song of the Year - Zehnaseeb from Hasee Toh Phasee
- 2014: Mirchi Music Awards - Album of the Year - 2 States

Vijay Awards

- 2009: Best Female Playback Singer – "Vaarayo Vaarayo" (Aadhavan)
- 2011: Best Female Playback Singer – "Sara Sara" (Vaagai Sooda Vaa)

Mazhavil Music Awards

- 2024 - Mazhavil Music Award for Best Duet - "Omane" (The Goat Life)
- 2025 - Mazhavil Music Award for Best Singer Female - "Nilagamanam" (Paathirathri)

Norway Tamil Film Festival Awards

- 2011: Best Female Playback Singer – "Sara Sara" (Vaagai Sooda Vaa)
- 2018: Best Female Playback Singer – "Kaathalae Kaathalae" (96)
  - Nominated : Best Female Dubbing Artist - 96

Vijay Music Awards

- 2010: Popular Female Playback Singer – "Kilimanjaro" (Endhiran)
- 2011: Best Female Singer Female – "Sara Sara" (Vaagai Sooda Vaa)

Sakshi Excellence Awards

- 2019: Most Popular Singer Of The Year - "Yenti Yenti" from Geetha Govindam & "Priyathama" from Majili
- 2021: Most Popular Singer Of The Year - "Oohale Oohale" from Jaanu

GAMA Awards

- 2024 - Best Female Playback Singer - "Aradhya" (Kushi)

JFW Movie Awards

- 2024: Best Dubbing Artist - Leo (Trisha Krishnan)
  - 2026: Nominated : Best Singer (Tamil) - "Cheenikkallu" (Bison Kaalamaadan)

The Times Film Awards

- 2011: The Chennai Times Award for Best Female Playback Singer – "Sara Sara" (Vaagai Sooda Vaa)

Edison Awards

- 2011: Edison Award for Best Female Playback Singer – "Chotta Chotta" (Engeyum Eppodhum)
- 2012: Edison Award for Best Female Playback Singer – "Asku Laska" (Nanban)
  - 2018 : Nominated, Edison Award for Best Female Playback Singer - "Kaathale Kaathale" ('96)

Ananda Vikatan Cinema Awards

- 2018: Best Playback Singer (Female) - All songs from 96

Isaiaruvi Tamil Music Awards

- 2007: Best Female Playback Singer – "Sahana" (Sivaji)
- 2009: Best Female Playback Singer – "Vaarayo Vaarayo" (Aadhavan)

Mirchi Music Awards South

- 2010: Best Female Playback Singer – Tamil – "Kilimanjaro" (Endhiran)

BIG Tamil Entertainment Awards

- 2010: BIG Tamil Award for Best Entertaining Female Singer – "Poove Poove" (Siddhu +2)
- 2011: BIG Tamil Melody Music Award for Best Female Playback Singer – "Sara Sara" (Vaagai Sooda Vaa)
- 2015: BIG Tamil Music Awards - Best Female Playback Singer - "Ennodu Nee Irundhaal" (I)

Zee Cine Awards Telugu

- 2019 - Zee Cine Awards Telugu for Best Female Playback Singer - "Priyathama Priyathama" (Majili)

Other awards

- 2002: Award from Ajanta Fine Arts for "Oru Deivam" (Kannathil Muthamittal)
- 2002: Best Media Associates Award for Best Female Playback Singer – "Oru Deivam" (Kannathil Muthamittal)
- 2002: ITFA Award for Best Upcoming Playback Singer – "Oru Deivam" (Kannathil Muthamittal)
- 2007: Film Fans Association Award for Beat Female Playback Singer – "Sahana" (Sivaji)
- 2007: Jaya TV Award for Best Female Playback Singer – "Sahana" (Sivaji)
- 2007: Lions Club Award for Best Female Playback singer – "Sahana(Sivaji)"
- 2009: Alandur Fine Arts for Best Female Playback Singer
- 2009: South Scope Cine Award for Best Female Playback Singer – "Vaarayo Vaarayo" (Aadhavan)
- 2010: MGR Sivaji Academy Award for Best Female Playback Singer – "Kilimanjaro" (Endhiran)
- 2010: Vijayam Tamil Movie Award for Favourite Female Singer of the Year
- 2011: Navaratna Women Achievers Award for Best Female Playback Singer
- 2011: Filmfans' Association Award for Best Female Playback Singer – "Sara Sara" (Vaagai Sooda Vaa)
- 2011: Variety Film Award for Best Female Playback Singer – "Sara Sara" (Vaagai Sooda Vaa)
- 2015: Ugadi Puraskar - Best Female Playback Singer - Vadhantune - "Run Raja Run"
- 2018: Behindwoods Gold Medals - Voice of the Year (Female) - 96
- 2018: Radio City Awards - Best Singer Female (Telugu) - Yenti Yenti - "Geetha Govindam" & Mellaga Mellaga - "Chi La Sow"
- 2018: Mahila Ratna Awards - Best Singer Female (Telugu) - Yenti Yenti - "Geetha Govindam"
- 2018: Ugadi Puraskar - Best Female Playback Singer - Yenti Yenti - "Geetha Govindam"
- 2021: Chandanavana Film Critics Academy Award for Best Playback Singer - Female for the song "Soul of Dia" from Dia

Other Nominations

- 2007: Star Screen Award for Best Female Playback – "Tere Bina"
- 2009: Tamil Cinema Press Awards for Best Female Playback Singer – "Nila Nee Vaanam" (Pokkisham)
- 2011: BIG Salute to Tamil Women Entertainer Award for Best Singer
- 2014: Screen Awards for Best Female Playback Singer - "Titli" (Chennai Express)
- 2014: Star Guild Awards for Best Female Playback Singer - " Main Rang Sharbaton Ka" (Phata Poster Nikla Hero)
- 2015: Bollywood Hungama Surfers Choice Music Awards for Best Female Playback Singer - "Zehnaseeb" (Hasee Toh Phasee)
- 2017: Female vocalist of the year for the song "Sairat Zala Ji" from the film Sairat, Mirchi Music Awards

=== Other awards ===
- 1999: All India First and Best Performer Award from Sangam Kala Group
- 2000: All India First from All India Radio for Ghazals
- 2003: Pride of Sangam Award
- 2008: RITZ Amazing Woman Award
- 2009: Vikatan Award for Best Television Show Host
- 2011: Award from SAARC Chamber for Women Entrepreneurship for Excellence
- 2011: Vocational Excellence Award from Rotary Club of Madras
- 2015: Mercedes Benz - Ritz Woman of Merit award
- 2015: Rotary Club Inner Wheel (Nanganallur) : Swarna Ratna Award
- 2016: Indian of the Year: CNN IBN : Chennai Micro
- 2025: Golden Icon of Inspiration : Galatta Pink
