= R. Kannan =

Indian film director

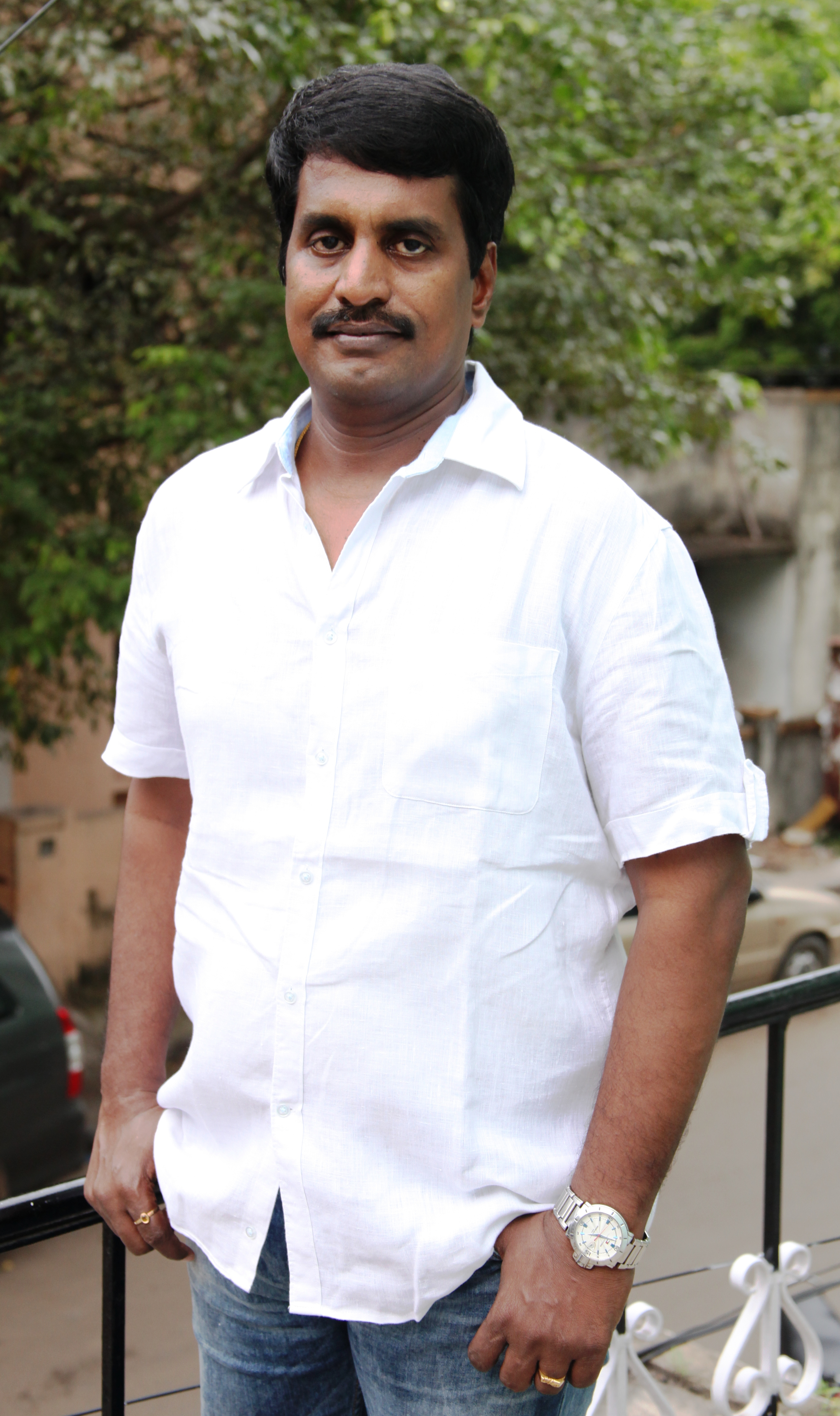
- Born: Rajmohan; 21 July 1971 (age 55); Kancheepuram, Tamil Nadu, India
- Occupations: Film Director; Screenwriter
- Years active: 2008–present
- Spouse: Madhana (m. 2009)
- Children: 2

R. Kannan (born Rajmohan on 21 July 1971) is an Indian filmmaker. He made his directorial debut with the successful Tamil film Jayamkondaan starring Vinay and Bhavana in 2008.

== Career ==
Kannan started his career assisting director Manobala before joining Mani Ratnam for films including Kannathil Muthamittal (2002), Ayutha Ezhuthu (2004) and Guru (2007). He made his directorial debut with the drama film, Jayamkondaan (2008) starring Vinay, Bhavana and Lekha Washington, winning critical acclaim and commercial success at the box office. Featuring the story of an estranged brother and sister fighting over an ancestral property, Kannan won praise for his work. Sify.com stated that Kannan "has the potential to churn out a neat feel-good entertainer", adding that "the most refreshing thing about Kannan's film is that he tries to combine mainstream Tamil film aesthetics with mass appeal". His second film, Kanden Kadhalai, a remake of Imtiaz Ali's Jab We Met (2007), featured Bharath and Tamannaah Bhatia in the lead roles and was also successful commercially. His subsequent releases Vandhaan Vendraan with Jiiva and Taapsee Pannu, and the remake of Delhi Belly in Tamil as Settai with Arya.

After the release of Settai, Kannan began pre-production works on a film titled Alangaram to be produced by PVP Cinemas during early 2014. He revealed that he had worked on the script for over two years and began negotiations with Karthi to play the lead role and Santhanam to portray a supporting role.

In October 2014, Kannan announced that he would direct and co-produce a film titled Poda! Aandavane En Pakkam, which would highlight the struggles faced by engineering degree graduates. After unsuccessful negotiations with Dinesh and Sridivya, Kannan eventually finalised Vishnu, Prayaga Martin and Swetha Ashok for the leading roles. The film began production in March 2015, with the team shooting for a single schedule and songs in Chennai with the lead actors. However the film failed to progress beyond the first schedule and was ultimately shelved. Kannan announced that he was simultaneously working on the script of a horror comedy titled Adiye Kantha in December 2014, but the film also did not materialise. In August 2016, he began work on an action film titled Ivan Thanthiran starring Gautham Karthik in the lead role.

== Filmography ==
=== As director, producer, and screenwriter ===
List of R. Kannan film directing credits
Year	Film	Credited as				Notes
Year	Film	Director	Screenplay	Story	Producer	Notes
2008	Jayamkondaan	✓	✓	✓		
2009	Kanden Kadhalai	✓	✓			Remake of Jab We Met
2011	Vandhaan Vendraan	✓	✓	✓		
2013	Settai	✓	✓			Remake of Delhi Belly
2014	Oru Oorla Rendu Raja	✓	✓	✓	✓	
2017	Ivan Thanthiran	✓	✓	✓	✓	
2019	Boomerang	✓	✓	✓	✓	Mashup of Yevadu and Kaththi
2020	Biskoth	✓	✓	✓	✓	
2021	Thalli Pogathey	✓	✓		✓	Remake of Ninnu Kori
2023	The Great Indian Kitchen	✓	✓			Remake of The Great Indian Kitchen
2023	Kasethan Kadavulada	✓	✓		✓	Remake of Kasethan Kadavulada
TBA	Gandhari	✓	✓	✓	✓	

=== As an actor ===
Year	Title	Role	Notes
2004	Aaytha Ezhuthu	Villager	Uncredited role
2011	Ko	Himself	Cameo appearance
