= Jayamkondaan =

2008 Indian Tamil-language romantic action film by R. Kannan

- Theatrical release poster
- Directed by: R. Kannan
- Written by: Pattukkottai Prabakar (Dialogues)
- Screenplay by: R. Kannan
- Story by: R. Kannan
- Produced by: T. G. Thiyagarajan; Selvi Thiyagarajan; T. Arjun
- Starring: Vinay; Bhavana; Lekha Washington
- Cinematography: Balasubramaniem
- Edited by: V. T. Vijayan
- Music by: Vidyasagar
- Production company: Sathya Jyothi Films
- Release date: 29 August 2008
- Running time: 145 minutes
- Country: India
- Language: Tamil

Jayam Kondaan (transl. The Victor) is a 2008 Indian Tamil-language romantic action film directed and written by R. Kannan in his directorial debut and produced by Sathya Jyothi Films. It stars Vinay, Bhavana and Lekha Washington, while Vivek, Santhanam, Kishore, Vasundhara Kashyap, Malavika Avinash, and Nizhalgal Ravi play supporting roles. The music was composed by Vidyasagar with cinematography by Balasubramaniem and editing by V. T. Vijayan.

The film revolves around an NRI civil engineer who returns to Chennai from London to set up his own business. He feels that if one has to reach their goal in life, it is better to win over their enemies and take them along. He finds out that his late father had another family and that his stepsister wants to steal his home. After clashes with his sister, he discovers another tragedy involving someone who wants to make a vendetta with the family. The film follows the sibling relationship and the threat from the avenger.

The film opened to worldwide audiences after several delays on 29 August 2008.

== Plot ==
Arjun (Vinay) is an IT professional who resigns from his job in London and returns to India, following his father's sudden death. He decides to set up a real estate business in Chennai from the funds he has saved so far. He goes to the bank to withdraw the money, but is shocked to see that there are only Rs. 15,700 in his account, while he had estimated the amount to be Rs. 6.5 million. Arjun doubts that his father must have invested the money somewhere in India. He inquires about his father's friends to find out about the money. At last, Arjun finds that his father had purchased a house in Madurai with the money, but also is shocked to know that his father had another wife named Chandrika (Malavika Avinash), who is a French teacher, and has a daughter named Brinda (Lekha Washington) through her.

Brinda gets an admission to study at MIT in the US, but her education loan is rejected. She decides to sell the house in Madurai and get the money needed for her education. Arjun comes to meet Chandrika and Brinda, asking Brinda not to sell the property as it was purchased with his money. Chandrika understands that her daughter's activities are wrong and that the house should belong to Arjun. Brinda is short-tempered and does not listen to Chandrika. Chandrika hands over the house documents to Arjun, and he leaves for Madurai to sell the house.

At Madurai, he meets Durairaj (Nizhalgal Ravi), a chili vendor, and his daughter Annapurani (Bhavana), who are the tenants. Durairaj is a friend of Arjun's father. Arjun explains his situation and requests that they vacate the home so that he can sell it. To convince Annapoorani, Arjun cooks up a story that they are childhood friends. To his surprise, Brinda comes to Madurai to prevent Arjun from selling the property. She approaches Guna (Kishore), a local goon, to help her stop Arjun. Guna comes with his wife, Poongodhai (Vasundhara Kashyap), to the registrar's office to stop the deal. A quarrel erupts between Arjun and Guna, where Poongodhai dies in the melee. This angers Guna, and he wants to kill Arjun.

Arjun escapes to Chennai with Brinda, but Chandrika passes away, and Brinda has no one to care for. Arjun takes Brinda to his home and asks her to stay with him, and she hesitantly agrees. Slowly, Arjun develops affection towards Brinda and decides to give her money for her education. Annapurani comes to Chennai for a volleyball match, and love blossoms between her and Arjun. To Arjun's surprise, Arjun and Annapurani were really childhood friends and very close. Arjun decides to leave for London and join his previous job, as Guna keeps searching for him. On the day of Arjun's flight to London, Guna kidnaps Brinda. Arjun returns from the airport to rescue Brinda, and Guna is killed in the fight. Brinda realizes her mistake and gets close to Arjun. Finally, Brindha, Annapurani, and Arjun unite.

== Cast ==
- Vinay as Arjun Sekhar
- Bhavana as Annapurani
- Lekha Washington as Brinda Sekhar
- Kishore as Guna
- Vivek as Gopal
- Santhanam as Bhavani
- Malavika Avinash as Chandrika
- Livingston as Police Officer
- Nizhalgal Ravi as Durairaj
- Saranya Mohan as Archana
- Vasundhara Kashyap as Poongodhai
- Krishna as Krishna
- Devan Ekambaram as Devan
- Cochin Haneefa as Kasi
- Sendrayan as Guna's Henchmen
- Meera Krishnan as Annapurani's mother
- Deepa Venkat as Aruna
- Mekha Rajan as Meera Krishna
- Aarthi as Sindha Mani
- Mayilsamy as Advocate
- Thalaivasal Vijay as Poongodhai's father
- Kamala Krishnaswamy as Apartment President
- Munnar Ramesh as Nagu
- George Maryan as Michael
- Poovilangu Mohan as Arjun's Chennai House Owner
- R. S. Shivaji as Ramalingam
- Vichu as Surveyor
- Vatsala Rajagopal as T. Nagar House Owner's wife
- Rail Ravi as Bank manager
- Suja Varunee (special appearance in 'Ore Or Naal En')

== Production ==
Jayamkondaan is the directorial debut of R. Kannan, and was shot in locations including Uzbekistan. Bhavana dubbed herself in Tamil for the film.

== Soundtrack ==
The film has six songs composed by Vidyasagar. The audio was released worldwide on 3 June 2008.

Song title	Singers	Lyrics	Length
"Adaimazhai Kalam"	Karthik	Vaali	5:25
"Adhaikoodavaa"	Sriram Parthasarathy	Kabilan	5:09
"Naan Varaindhu Vaitha"	Hariharan & Madhushree	Yugabharathi	4:49
"Ore Or Naal En"	Benny Dayal	Vaali	4:22
"Sutrivarum Boomi"	Sadhana Sargam	Na. Muthukumar	4:42
"Ullaasa Ulagam"	Tippu	A. Maruthakasi	2:39

== Reception ==
The film received positive reviews and was lauded by critics for its simplicity in its presentation. The film was described by Sify as a "breezy entertainer", with the reviewer taking a liking to the film, comparing Jayamkondaan to the films Run, Sandakozhi, and the Malayalam film Kireedam. The script and direction was described as "successful due to straightforward narration and packaging". Lekha Washington's performance was praised, citing that she "sparkles as the half sister in a well etched role" and is "the surprise packet and has the credentials to make it big". Vinay "looks too thin and fragile" but "adds to the film's energy", while Bhavana has nothing much to do other than "looking prim and proper". Out of the comedians, Sify reports that Krishna and Santhanam were more effective than Vivek who at times you feel speaks more dialogues than necessary. Praise is also heaped on Athisaya as the small town girl who gets enamored by the rowdy, describing her as a "revelation", while Kishore "fits the bill as the bad guy".

In unison, Rediff.com also praises the film as a "nice blend of the cinematic and logic". The reviewer describes Vinay, "as the protagonist is very comfortable in his role" and that he has "expressive eyes, emotes well, and makes sure his audience isn't disappointed. However Lekha Washington is clearly the surprise package", echoing Sify.com's views. However it claims that Bhavana, with her "soulful eyes and acting talent, could have done with a meatier role". "The film has risen above the clichés as per the review of The Hindu and the reviewer has praised Vinay for choosing this film as his second project".

Critics claimed that Kannan deserves credit for a "good job" on his story and screenplay. Vidayasagar's music was described as is "so-so", there is a feeling that you have heard these tunes before with the "picturisation is nowhere near the high standards set up by the director's guru (Mani Ratnam). Rediff claims that Balasubramaniam's camera makes sure the "viewers aren't treated to bizarre angles" and that V. T. Vijayan's editing is "slick and smooth".
