= Vandhaan Vendraan =

- Theatrical release poster
- Directed by: R. Kannan
- Written by: R. Kannan; Pattukottai Prabhakar (dialogues)
- Produced by: K. S. Sreenivasan
- Starring: Jiiva; Nandaa; Taapsee
- Cinematography: P. G. Muthiah
- Edited by: V. T. Vijayan
- Music by: Thaman S
- Production company: Vasan Visual Ventures
- Release date: 16 September 2011
- Running time: 138 minutes
- Country: India
- Language: Tamil

Vanthaan Vendraan (transl. He Came, He Conquered) is a 2011 Indian Tamil-language action thriller film written and directed by R. Kannan. The film stars Jiiva, Nandaa and Taapsee in the lead roles, while Rahman and Santhanam play supporting roles. The music was composed by Thaman S with cinematography by P. G. Muthiah and editing by V. T. Vijayan. The film was released on 16 September 2011.

== Plot ==
At a village school, a boy recites the national anthem before all the staff and students. Another boy is seen running to school as he is late. His teacher punishes him while comparing him to the boy who recited earlier, who is revealed to be his younger half-brother. Enmity grows in the older brother as he is always compared to his younger brother. The younger brother burns the photo of the older brother's father, as he was the reason for his defeat in the school's kabaddi match. In retaliation, the older brother throws the younger brother into a well. Watching him drown in the well, the older brother runs away from the village.

The film then opens to Mumbai, just a few years after the incident. The older brother grows up to become Ramana, an underworld don involved in smuggling with the help of the local police and political support. He tries to kill his rival Govardhan but fails. Arjun tries to see him for many days but is not able to. Finally, with the help of Ramana's cook Delhi, he manages to see him and tells him about his life story. Arjun is a boxer and accidentally meets Anjana while going to a boxing selection match. He could not attend the match because he spoils the miniature that Anjana was carrying for her interview the same day.

He helps her out, and in turn, Anjana travels to Kerala to meet the person in charge of the boxing selection match so that Arjun can get a second chance. However, it turns out that Arjun has come with her to Kerala to express his love for her, which she does not reciprocate. Finally, she agrees on the condition that her father agrees. When Arjun meets Anjana's father, he rejects Arjun's marriage proposal to his daughter before being accidentally shot and killed by Ramana when he tries to kill Govardhan. Anjana proposes a deal to Arjun that if he makes Ramana surrender to the police, she will marry him, and he accepts. Arjun has come to Ramana to make him surrender, but Ramana and his gang thrash Arjun and throw him out.

Anjana pesters Arjun, as he is taking a long time to make Ramana surrender. To speed things up, Arjun demolishes Ramana's smuggling business and leaks about him to the press. The police seal Ramana's business and plan to kill him in an encounter. Since all this happened because of Arjun, a fight ensues between them, where Ramana stabs Arjun. Delhi comes in and reveals to Ramana that Arjun is the latter's younger brother whom he threw in the well in their childhood. It is also revealed that what he told him about Anjana and her revenge for her father's death was a false story so that Ramana would have compassion for their love, as Ramana's love failed. Arjun had thought Ramana would succumb to the former's plea and surrender to the police so that he would escape from the police's encounter and he could return to their family.

Ramana realizes himself and surrenders to the police, but not before admitting Arjun to a hospital, saving his life. Arjun returns home and reunites with his family. In a letter Ramana writes to his family while he is in jail, he promises to come back and be more responsible from now on. His parents were touched by this. Ramana's parents plan his marriage to a girl, Minnal. In the end, a girl identical to Arjun's imaginary, fake girlfriend Anjana, meets Arjun, similar to their meeting in his story. The film ends with the note, "The love in his imagination becomes true."

== Cast ==
- Jiiva as Arjun
  - Master Vasanth as Young Arjun
- Nandaa as Ramana
  - Sree Raam as Young Ramana
- Taapsee as Anjana
- Rahman as Mumbai Commissioner
- Santhanam as Delhi
- Azhagam Perumal as Arjun and Ramana's father
- Malavika Avinash as Arjun and Ramana's mother
- Raviprakash as Anjana's father
- Sapan Saran as Ramana's lover
- John Vijay as Training Coach
- Ulhas Tayade as Ashok Tiwari
- Ranjith Velayudhan
- Nizhalgal Ravi as Police Officer
- Manobala as Muralidharan
- Singamuthu as Vegetable Seller "Tharasu" Mani
- G. Marimuthu as Arjun and Ramana's teacher
- Maran as Mani
- Kamala Krishnaswamy
- Nandha Saravanan as Ramana's gang member
- A. R. Manikandan as Shop Man
- Rail Ravi
- Srividya Mohan as Minnal
- Rachana Maurya in an item number

== Production ==
The film's first look poster drew comparisons to the Hindi film I Hate Luv Storys, leading to criticism and allegations of plagiarism, which the director denied. Jiiva learned boxing for his role. A number of scenes were shot at Sultan Bathery. The team filmed in a forest in the Kerala-Karnataka for 23 days. The film was also shot at Goa.

== Soundtrack ==
The soundtrack was composed by Thaman S. The album launch was held on 21 July 2011.

Track listing
No.	Title	Lyrics	Singer(s)	Length
1.	"Anjana Anjana"	Yugabharathi	Aalap Raju, Bhasi, Chinmayi, Ramya NSK	5:18
2.	"Kanchana Mala"	Thamarai	Karthik, Naveen Madhav Priya Himesh	4:08
3.	"Anjo"	Madhan Karky	Devan Ekambaram, Rahul Nambiar, Haricharan	3:17
4.	"Thirandhen Thirandhen"	Madhan Karky	Aalaap Raju, Javed Ali,Shreya Ghoshal	4:48
5.	"Nagarudhe Nagarudhe"	Na. Muthukumar	Thaman, Gopi Sundar, Pepe	3:35
6.	"Mudivilla Mazhaiyodu"	Madhan Karky	Hariharan, Vijay Prakash	5:12
Total length:				26:18

== Critical reception ==
Sify rated the film as "average" citing that "the key problem with the film is its script and narration", whilst describing Thaman's music as the "major plus point". N. Venkateswaran of The Times of India wrote, "If somebody conquers with this movie, it is only Thaman — the rest of the cast and technicians fail due to the poor screenplay". Pavithra Srinivasan of Rediff.com wrote that "the screenplay falls apart spectacularly. The mildly engaging first half, with the antics of Santhanam, works slightly, but in the second half with its supposed cat-and-mouse games, silly plot twists and melodramatic climax, you can do little but sigh with disappointment". Supriya Kalidoss of The Hindu wrote, "The major highlight of the film is its picturesque location", adding, "It is a good movie with all those basic ingredients of a wholesome entertainer. It is a technically rich film". The New Indian Express wrote, "He came, but didn't conquer!" and called the film a "cocktail gone awry".
