= Kanden Kadhalai =

2009 film R. Kannan

- Theatrical release poster
- Directed by: R. Kannan
- Written by: Pattukkottai Prabakar (dialogues)
- Screenplay by: Kannan
- Story by: Imtiaz Ali
- Based on: Jab We Met (Hindi) by Imtiaz Ali
- Produced by: V. M. Lalitha; G. Dhananjayan
- Starring: Bharath; Tamannaah Bhatia
- Cinematography: P. G. Muthiah
- Edited by: Kola Bhaskar
- Music by: Vidyasagar
- Production companies: Blue Ocean Entertainment; Moser Baer
- Distributed by: Sun Pictures
- Release date: 30 October 2009
- Running time: 150 minutes
- Country: India
- Language: Tamil

Kanden Kadhalai (transl. I Saw My Love) is a 2009 Indian Tamil-language romantic comedy film directed by R. Kannan. The film, a remake of the 2007 Hindi film Jab We Met, with Bharath and Tamannaah Bhatia reprising the roles of Shahid Kapoor and Kareena Kapoor. The film was released on 30 October 2009 and became a commercial success. It was later dubbed in Telugu as Priya Priyathama.

== Plot ==
Shakthi becomes the managing director of the Rajasekhar Group of Companies after his father's death. Dejected by continuous business losses, his girlfriend Anita marrying another man, and his estranged mother suing him for company shares, Shakthi feels his life collapsing. Overwhelmed, he leaves his office one day and boards a random train without knowing its destination.

On board, he meets Anjali, a bubbly and talkative young woman returning to her hometown Theni after completing her studies. Her nonstop chatter irritates the withdrawn Shakthi. When he contemplates jumping off the moving train, Anjali's presence prevents him. She shares that she loves Gautham and plans to elope with him because her orthodox family would never approve.

Later that night, Anjali discovers Shakthi missing from the train and spots him sitting alone on a station platform. She gets down to bring him back, but the train departs, leaving them both stranded. Blaming Shakthi, Anjali insists he help her reach the next station. They hire a cab, but she misses the train again. Forced to stay overnight in a small lodge, they plan to continue to Theni the next day. Slowly, a friendship blossoms, and Shakthi begins admiring her cheerful attitude and optimism.

Shakthi opens up about his personal troubles, and Anjali advises him to let go of his bitterness and live happily. She even tells him there's no harm in his mother choosing to remarry, which makes Shakthi realize his mistake and softens his resentment.

When they reach Theni, Anjali's affectionate family insists he stay for a week. Meanwhile, her marriage is arranged with a relative, Mokkarasu, which she opposes. She decides to run away to Ooty to reunite with Gautham and persuades Shakthi to accompany her. Her family assumes she has eloped with him. Shakthi, who has secretly fallen in love with Anjali, hides his feelings and drops her off in Ooty. Despite her protests, he tells her their journey together is over and returns to Chennai, determined to rebuild his business.

Rejuvenated by Anjali's influence, Shakthi brings energy and optimism to his work. His company thrives as he launches new ideas and reconciles with his mother, even making her the chairwoman. Ten months later, the company's success peaks, and a televised advertisement featuring Shakthi catches the attention of Anjali's parents. Her father, Ramana, visits him in Chennai and reveals that Anjali hasn't contacted them in ten months. Shocked, Shakthi vows to find her and heads to Ooty.

There he meets Gautham, who confesses that he had rejected Anjali's request to marry, fearing his father's disapproval. He admits he never tried to reach her afterward as he was busy with his new business. Disappointed, Shakthi searches for Anjali and discovers she is now working as a schoolteacher, living quietly and alone.

He meets her and urges her to return home, but Anjali refuses. She explains that Gautham prioritized ambition over love and that she can't face her family after eloping. Shakthi patiently convinces her that going home will heal everyone.

On the day of their return, Gautham arrives unexpectedly to apologize. The three travel together to Theni, only to find Anjali's family has planned a grand welcome, believing she and Shakthi are already married. Mistaking Gautham for Shakthi's friend, they even organize a reception.

Gautham pressures Anjali to tell the truth, but she hesitates, realizing her affection for Shakthi has grown stronger. Seeing her torn, Gautham urges Shakthi to leave before she changes her mind. Heartbroken yet respectful, Shakthi departs for the railway station.

Moments later, Anjali gathers her courage, runs after him, and confesses her love at the station. Shakthi, overjoyed, accepts her feelings. The two finally unite, bringing closure to their long journey of loss, rediscovery, and love.

== Cast ==
- Bharath as Sakthivel / Rajasekharan
- Tamannaah Bhatia as Anjali (voiced by Chinmayi Sripaada)
- Santhanam as Mokka Rasu
- Sapan Saran as Roja (Anjali's younger sister)
- Munna as Gautham
- Kamala Krishnaswamy as Sakthi's mother
- Nizhalgal Ravi as Ramana
- Sudha as Anjali's mother
- Deepa Venkat as Anjali's sister-in-law
- Ravichandran as Anjali's grandfather
- Azhagam Perumal as Perumal
- Manobala as Mayil Vaganam
- Shammu as Anita
- Singamuthu as Periappa
- Pandu as Ramanathan
- Mayilsamy as hotel owner
- Thambi Ramaiah as Police

Cameo appearance

- Lollu Sabha Jeeva as Arjun

== Production ==
Though it was initially reported that the film was titled Raja Rani, that title was already registered for a different film; the title was eventually confirmed to be Kanden Kadhalai. Filming began in March 2009. The film was shot in locations including Chengalpattu, Coonoor, Ooty, Pollachi and Theni. Filming wrapped that July.

== Music ==
The film's music was composed by Vidyasagar. The soundtrack, consisting of six tracks, was released on 14 August 2009. Pavithra Srinivasan of Rediff.com wrote, "It looks like Vidhyasagar has really tried to produce a set of tunes that veer away from his usual. It works sometimes, at others, the effort seems contrived. Overall, though, the effect isn't too bad. Perhaps the picturisation might introduce new layers to the music. Worth a listen once".

Track listing
| No. | Title | Lyrics | Singer(s) | Length |
|---|---|---|---|---|
| 1. | "Venpanju" | Yugabharathi | Udit Narayan, Karthik | 4:56 |
| 2. | "Suthudhu Suthudhu" | Na. Muthukumar | Hariharan | 04:16 |
| 3. | "Naan Mozhi Arindhen" | Yugabharathi | Suresh Wadkar | 05:39 |
| 4. | "Kaatru Pudhidhaai" | Yugabharathi | Rahul Nambiar | 05:23 |
| 5. | "Oododi Poren" | Madhan Karky | Lavanya, Rashmi Vijayan | 04:22 |
| 6. | "Oru Naal Iravil" | Na. Muthukumar | Tippu, Benny Dayal | 04:46 |
| Total length: | | | | 29:22 |

== Critical reception ==
Sify wrote that Kanden Kadhalai "is a cute love story which reaches directly to your heart and good fun while it ". Pavithra Srinivasan of Rediff.com wrote, "In comparison with Jab We Met, you might find the magic slightly wanting. On its own, though, Kanden Kadhalai has its unique moments. And for that, it's certainly worth a watch". Malathi Rangarajan of The Hindu wrote, "Forget the original and Tamannah's over-acting in certain scenes. Just enjoy her radiance, and Bharath's generally apt underplay".
